= Jason Molloy =

Irish footballer (born 1988)

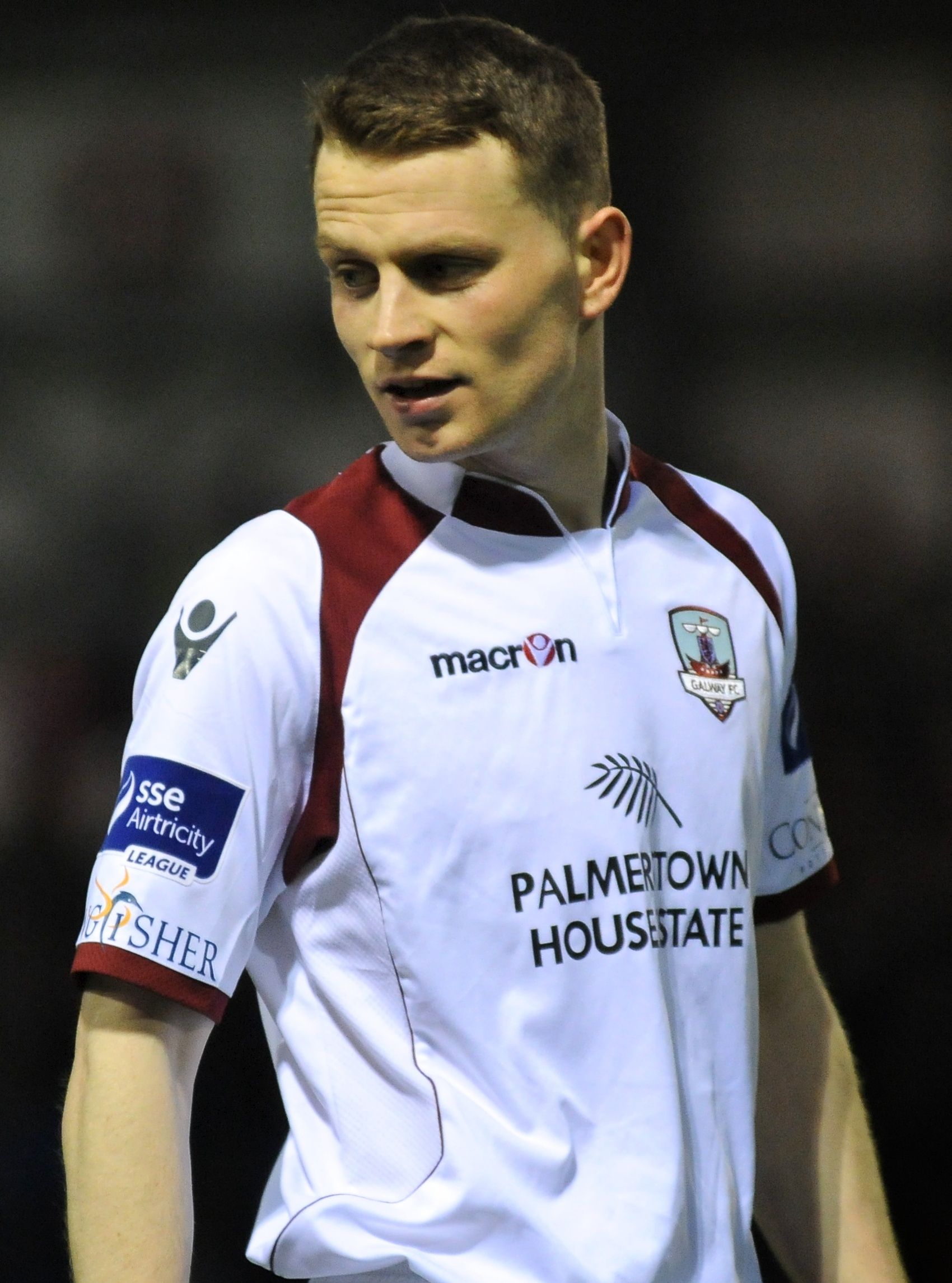
- Molloy with Galway FC in 2014

Personal information
- Date of birth: 22 September 1988 (age 38)
- Place of birth: Galway, Ireland
- Height: 1.72 m (5 ft 8 in)
- Positions: Winger; striker

Team information
- Current team: Mervue United
- Number: 11

Youth career
- Mervue United
- 2007–2008: Galway United

Senior career*
Years	Team	Apps	(Gls)
2007–2010	Galway United	50	(5)
2011–2013	Mervue United	73	(14)
2014–2015	Galway United	38	(3)
2016	Mervue United		
2017	Athlone Town	9	(0)
2017–	Mervue United	5	(0)
Total		175	(22)
- * Club domestic league appearances and goals

Jason Molloy (born 22 September 1988) is an Irish footballer who plays as a winger or striker for FAI National League club Mervue United.

Molloy played in the League of Ireland where he played for Mervue United, Athlone Town and had two stints with Galway United.

== Youth career ==
Molloy played youth football with Mervue United before joining Galway United's U21s in 2007. He was a part of the Galway United U20 team that won the Connacht Senior Cup in 2008.

== Career ==
=== Galway United ===
On 9 November 2007, Molloy made his debut for League of Ireland Premier Division side Galway United on the last day of the 2007 season, coming on as a second-half substitute, replacing Alan Murphy in a 2–1 win over UCD in Terryland Park.

Molloy scored in his first game in the 2008 season, scoring Galway United's only goal in a 1–3 defeat to Cork City.

In the second last game of the 2010 season, Molloy scored a brace, including an 89th-minute winner, as Galway United defeated top of the league Bohemians 3–2, in a result which directly led to Shamrock Rovers passing out Bohemians and winning the league. On 2 November 2010, Molloy started in the Promotion/relegation play-off as Galway United defeated Bray Wanderers 1–0 to retain their Premier Division status for the next season.

=== Mervue United ===
On 30 January 2011, Molloy signed for League of Ireland First Division club Mervue United. On 29 April 2011, Molloy scored a brace in a 3–1 win over Monaghan United at Fahy's Field. Molloy scored a brace in the first game he played in the 2012 season, scoring two in a 3–4 defeat against Finn Harps away at Finn Park.

At the end of the 2013 season Mevue finished 3rd qualifying for the play-offs. Molloy scored in the first-leg as Mervue beat Longford Town 1–0 at Fahy's Field. Molloy then scored with a free-kick in the second-leg at the City Calling Stadium, where Mervue lost 2–3 on the night after extra-time, meaning the game ended 3–3 on aggregate and went to penalties. Molloy took Mervue's first penalty which he missed as Mervue would go on to miss all of their penalties and Longford would advance to the play-off final.

=== Return to Galway United ===
After the 2013 season Mervue United and Salthill Devon withdrew from the League of Ireland to make way for the returning Galway United, who had bee rebranded as Galway FC. On 12 December 2013, Molloy became the first person to sign for Galway FC alongside Mervue teammate Stephen Walsh. At the end of the 2014 season, Molloy featured in the play-off final as Galway defeated UCD to gain promotion back to the Premier Division.

During the 2015 season the club, now once again known as Galway United, made it to the League of Ireland Cup final, where they faced St Patrick's Athletic at Eamonn Deacy Park. Molloy started in the final as the game ended 0–0 after extra-time and Galway would go on to lose on penalties.

=== Athlone Town ===
After a year with Mervue United in the Galway & District League, Molloy signed for League of Ireland First Division club Athlone Town.

=== Mervue United ===
Since 2017, Molloy has played for Mervue United in the Galway & District League and has appeared for them in competitions like the Michael Byrne Cup and FAI Junior Cup.

In 2026, Molloy was included in the squad for Mervue's first season in the newly founded FAI National League.

== Career statistics ==
=== Club ===
Appearances and goals by club, season and competition
Club	Season	League			National cup (Note: Includes FAI Cup)		League cup (Note: Includes League of Ireland Cup)		Other		Total	
Club	Season	Division	Apps	Goals	Apps	Goals	Apps	Goals	Apps	Goals	Apps	Goals
Galway United	2007	LOI Premier Division	1	0	0	0	0	0	—		1	0
Galway United	2008	LOI Premier Division	10	1	2	0	2	0	—		14	1
Galway United	2009	LOI Premier Division	21	2	2	0	2	0	—		25	2
Galway United	2010	LOI Premier Division	18	2	3	1	1	0	1 (Note: Appearance in 2010 Promotion/relegation play-off)	0	23	3
Galway United	Total		50	5	7	1	5	0	1	0	63	6
Mervue United	2011	LOI First Division	24	4	1	0	2	0	—		27	4
Mervue United	2012	LOI First Division	24	5	3	0	0	0	—		27	5
Mervue United	2013	LOI First Division	25	5	1	0	0	0	2 (Note: Appearances in 2013 Promotion/relegation play-off)	2	28	7
Mervue United	Total		73	14	5	0	2	0	2	2	82	16
Galway United	2014	LOI First Division	23	2	2	1	2	0	3 (Note: Appearances in 2014 Promotion/relegation play-off)	0	30	3
Galway United	2015	LOI Premier Division	15	1	2	0	4	0	—		21	1
Galway United	Total		38	3	4	1	6	0	3	0	51	4
Athlone Town	2017	LOI First Division	9	0	0	0	0	0	1 (Note: Appearance in Leinster Senior Cup)	0	10	0
Mervue United	2026	FAI National League	5	0	—		—		—		5	0
Career total			175	22	16	2	13	0	7	2	210	26

== Honours ==
Galway United

- League of Ireland Cup; runner up: 2015
