= 2013 Mervue United A.F.C. season =

Irish football club season

Mervue United
2013 season
- Manager: Johnny Glynn
- Stadium: Fahy's Field
- First Division: 3rd (play-offs)
- FAI Cup: Second round
- League of Ireland Cup: Second Round
- Top goalscorer: Gary Shanahan (10)
Home colours	Away colours

The 2013 Mervue United A.F.C. season was the football club's 6th season in the League of Ireland and their fifth consecutive season in the League of Ireland First Division since being promoted from the A Championship in 2008.

The club finished the season in 3rd qualifying for the play-offs where they lost to Longford Town on penalties.

This was the club's last season in the League of Ireland as at the end of the season, Mervue along with Salthill Devon withdrew from the League of Ireland to make room for the newly refounded Galway FC. The club would go on to play in the Galway & District League until they returned to the League of Ireland in the 2026 FAI National League.

== Squad ==
Name	Nationality	Position	Date of birth (age)	Previous Club	Signed	Notes
Goalkeepers
Connor Gleeson	(Republic of Ireland)	GK	June 13, 1993 (aged 20)	(Republic of Ireland) Academy	2010	
Ger Hanley	(Republic of Ireland)	GK	April 4, 1991 (aged 22)	(Republic of Ireland) Shelbourne	2013	
Conor O'Malley	(Republic of Ireland)	GK	August 1, 1994 (aged 19)	(Republic of Ireland) Salthill Devon	2013	
Defenders
Martin Conneely	(Republic of Ireland)	DF	April 29, 1990 (aged 23)	(Republic of Ireland) Academy	2009	
Mike Elwood	(Republic of Ireland)	DF	May 22, 1991 (aged 22)	(Republic of Ireland) Academy	2010	
Kenny Farrell	(Republic of Ireland)	DF	February 3, 1989 (aged 24)	(Republic of Ireland) Renmore	2008	
Ross Kenny	(Republic of Ireland)	DF	October 28, 1991 (aged 21)	(Republic of Ireland) Athlone Town	2013	
Marc Ludden	(Republic of Ireland)	DF	February 28, 1990 (aged 23)	(Republic of Ireland) Corofin United	2009	
Paul Sinnott	(Republic of Ireland)	DF	July 24, 1986 (aged 27)	(Republic of Ireland) Galway United	2012	
Stephen Walsh	(Republic of Ireland)	DF	August 29, 1990 (aged 23)	(Republic of Ireland) Galway United	2012	
Joe Woods	(Republic of Ireland)	DF	February 21, 1993 (aged 20)	(Republic of Ireland) Athlone Town	2013	
Midfielders
Gary Curran	(Republic of Ireland)	MF	September 22, 1987 (aged 26)	(Northern Ireland) Ballinamallard United	2013	
Gary Kelly	(Republic of Ireland)	MF	July 1, 1991 (aged 22)	(Republic of Ireland) Galway United	2012	
Shane Keogh	(Republic of Ireland)	MF	September 1, 1993 (aged 20)	(Republic of Ireland) Galway United	2011	
Tom King	(Republic of Ireland)	MF	June 30, 1989 (aged 24)	(Republic of Ireland) Galway United	2011	Captain
Alex Lee	(Republic of Ireland)	MF	February 2, 1988 (aged 25)	(Republic of Ireland) Galway United	2008	
Alan Murphy	(Republic of Ireland)	MF	October 3, 1981 (aged 32)	(Republic of Ireland) Galway United	2012	
Barry O'Mahoney	(Republic of Ireland)	MF	July 10, 1992 (aged 21)	(Republic of Ireland) Athlone Town	2013	
Noel Varley	(Republic of Ireland)	MF	December 29, 1990 (aged 22)	(Republic of Ireland) Academy	2010	
Forwards
Michael Duffy	(Republic of Ireland)	FW	September 8, 1982 (aged 31)	(Republic of Ireland) Ballina Town	2013	
Brendan Lavelle	(Republic of Ireland)	FW	September 13, 1989 (aged 24)	(Republic of Ireland) Ballina Town	2013	
Ryan Manning	(Republic of Ireland)	FW	June 14, 1996 (aged 17)	(Republic of Ireland) Cregmore/Claregalway	2013	
Jason Molloy	(Republic of Ireland)	FW	September 22, 1988 (aged 25)	(Republic of Ireland) Galway United	2011	
Gary Shanahan	(Republic of Ireland)	FW	February 15, 1993 (aged 20)	(Republic of Ireland) Dundalk	2013	
Players who departed before the end of the season
Michael McSweeney	(Republic of Ireland)	DF	June 17, 1988 (aged 25)	(Republic of Ireland) UCC	2012	
Brian O'Donoghue	(Republic of Ireland)	GK	September 10, 1983 (aged 29)	(Republic of Ireland) Academy	2004	
Oscar Sibanda	(Zimbabwe)	MF	January 8, 1988 (aged 25)	(Republic of Ireland) Salthill Devon	2013	

=== Transfers ===
==== In ====
Date	Position	Nationality	Name	Last club	Ref.
January 2023	GK	(Republic of Ireland)	Conor O'Malley	(Republic of Ireland) Salthill Devon	
January 2023	MF	(Zimbabwe)	Oscar Sibanda	(Republic of Ireland) Salthill Devon	
February 2023	DF	(Republic of Ireland)	Ross Kenny	(Republic of Ireland) Athlone Town	
February 2023	DF	(Republic of Ireland)	Joe Woods	(Republic of Ireland) Athlone Town	
February 2023	MF	(Republic of Ireland)	Barry O'Mahoney	(Republic of Ireland) Athlone Town	
February 2023	MF	(Republic of Ireland)	Gary Curran	(Northern Ireland) Ballinamallard United	
February 2023	FW	(Republic of Ireland)	Gary Shanahan	(Republic of Ireland) Dundalk	
5 September 2023	GK	(Republic of Ireland)	Ger Hanley	(Republic of Ireland) Shelbourne	

==== Out ====
Date	Position	Nationality	Name	To	Ref.
12 December 2012	FW	(Republic of Ireland)	Patrick Hoban	(Republic of Ireland) Dundalk	
January 2013	GK	(Republic of Ireland)	Ronan Forde	(Republic of Ireland) Salthill Devon	
18 January 2013	FW	(France)	Etanda Nkololo	(Republic of Ireland) Longford Town	
July 2013	MF	(Republic of Ireland)	Dan Cunningham	(Republic of Ireland) Salthill Devon	
July 2013	MF	(Zimbabwe)	Oscar Sibanda	(Republic of Ireland) Salthill Devon	

== Club ==
- Manager: Johnny Glynn
- Assistant Manager: Gary O'Connor
- First Team Coach: Alan Murphy (Note: Murphy was signed as a player, however spent the entire season injured and thus worked on the coaching staff)
- Goalkeeping Coach: Adrian Cronin (Note: Cronin featured in a few match day squads as a second-choice keeper during the season)

== Competitions ==
=== League of Ireland First Division ===
==== League Table ====
Pos	Team	Pld	W	D	L	GF	GA	GD	Pts	Promotion or relegation
1	Athlone Town (C, P)	28	16	7	5	42	22	+20	55	Promoted to Premier Division
2	Longford Town	28	15	5	8	55	34	+21	50	Lost promotion/relegation play-offs
3	Mervue United (Note: Mervue United and Salthill Devon withdrew from the league to make way for Galway F.C. after the FAI declared that Galway city and County Galway should be represented in the League of Ireland by a single club.)	28	14	7	7	46	31	+15	49	Lost promotion/relegation play-offs
4	Waterford United	28	14	5	9	40	24	+16	47	
5	Wexford Youths	28	10	3	15	29	47	−18	33	

(C) Champions; (P) Promoted

==== Results summary ====
Overall								Home						Away					
Pld	W	D	L	GF	GA	GD	Pts	W	D	L	GF	GA	GD	W	D	L	GF	GA	GD
28	14	7	7	46	31	+15	49	9	3	2	26	14	+12	5	4	5	20	17	+3

==== Matches ====
Win Draw Loss

9 March 2013 1	Athlone Town	0–0	Mervue United	Lissywollen, Athlone
19:45 GMT		Report		Stadium: Athlone Town Stadium; Attendance: 380; Referee: Rob Harvey

15 March 2013 2	Mervue United	2–1	Salthill Devon	Mervue, County Galway
19:45 GMT	King 13'; Manning 18'	Report	Enubele 71'	Stadium: Fahy's Field; Attendance: 265; Referee: Simon Rogers

23 March 2013 3	Waterford United	0–4	Mervue United	Waterford, County Waterford
19:00 GMT		Report	King 37', 70'; Varley 42'; Molloy 75'	Stadium: RSC; Attendance: 410; Referee: Rhona Daly

29 March 2013 4	Mervue United	2–2	Finn Harps	Mervue, County Galway
19:45 GMT	Manning 23'; Lavelle 32'; Molly (penalty missed) 69'	Report	McMonagle 56'; McHugh 61' (pen.)	Stadium: Fahy's Field; Attendance: 401; Referee: Kevin O'Regan

6 April 2013 5	Longford Town	1–1	Mervue United	Longford, County Longford
19:30 GMT	O'Sullivan 12'	Report	Molloy 55'	Stadium: Bishopsgate; Attendance: 319; Referee: James McKell

13 April 2013 6	Cobh Ramblers	5–3	Mervue United	Cobh, County Cork
19:45 GMT	Meade 28', 66' (pen.), 78' (pen.), 86' (pen.); O'Neill 30'	Report	Manning 4' (penalty missed) 53'; Ludden 48' (red card) 66'; Molloy 54'; Gleeson (red card) 75'; Elwood (red card) 84'	Stadium: St Colman's Park; Attendance: 312; Referee: Simon Rogers
Note: Mervue did not have a goalkeeper on the bench for this game, so when Connor Gleeson was sent off, Defender Mike Elwood went in goals. Elwood himself was sent off 9 minutes later, after which Stephen Walsh went in goals.

19 April 2013 7	Mervue United	4–1	Wexford Youths	Mervue, County Galway
19:45 GMT	Walsh 51'; Curran 79' (pen.); Shanahan 82'; Varley 87'	Report	Nolan 73'	Stadium: Fahy's Field; Attendance: 211; Referee: Rhona Daly

26 April 2013 8	Mervue United	2–2	Athlone Town	Mervue, County Galway
19:45 GMT	Ludden 26' (o.g.); Walsh 28', 64'	Report	Gorman 90+3' (pen.)	Stadium: Fahy's Field; Attendance: 277; Referee: Ray Matthews

3 May 2013 9	Salthill Devon	0–0	Mervue United	Drom, County Galway
19:45 GMT		Report		Stadium: Drom Soccer Park; Attendance: 148; Referee: Kevin O'Regan

10 May 2013 10	Mervue United	2–1	Waterford United	Mervue, County Galway
19:45 GMT	Manning 5'; Sinnott 79'	Report	Sullivan 90'	Stadium: Fahy's Field; Attendance: 217; Referee: Adriano Reale

17 May 2013 11	Finn Harps	1–0	Mervue United	Ballybofey, County Donegal
20:00 GMT	McCarron 45'	Report		Stadium: Finn Park; Attendance: 580; Referee: Rob Harvey

24 May 2013 12	Mervue United	1–2	Longford Town	Mervue, County Galway
19:45 GMT	Sinnott 44'	Report	McDonagh (red card) 53'; O'Sullivan 74'; O'Neill 76'	Stadium: Fahy's Field; Attendance: 357; Referee: Andrew Mullally

8 June 2013 13	Mervue United	1–0	Cobh Ramblers	Mervue, County Galway
16:30 GMT	Manning 40'	Report		Stadium: Fahy's Field; Attendance: 181; Referee: John McLoughlin

14 June 2013 14	Wexford Youths	2–0	Galway United	Crossabeg, County Wexford
19:45 GMT	Molloy 8', 90+2'	Report	Curran (penalty missed) 61'; Walsh (red card) 79'	Stadium: Ferrycarrig Park; Attendance: 141; Referee: Rob Harvey

28 June 2013 15	Athlone Town	3–0	Mervue United	Lissywollen, Athlone
19:45 GMT	Gorman 7' (pen.), 34', 65'	Report	Conneely (red card) 6'	Stadium: Athlone Town Stadium; Attendance: 568; Referee: Ray Matthews

6 July 2013 16	Mervue United	2–1	Salthill Devon	Mervue, County Galway
17:00 GMT	Shanahan 51', 85'	Report	Curran (red card) 78'; Sibanda 81'	Stadium: Fahy's Field; Attendance: 245; Referee: John McLoughlin

12 July 2013 17	Waterford United	0–0	Mervue United	Waterford, County Waterford
19:45 GMT		Report		Stadium: RSC; Attendance: 343; Referee: Rhona Daly

19 July 2013 18	Mervue United	4–0	Finn Harps	Mervue, County Galway
19:45 GMT	Molloy 19'; Duffy 50'; Ludden 58'; Manning 78'	Report		Stadium: Fahy's Field; Attendance: 206; Referee: Keith Callanan

27 July 2013 19	Longford Town	1–3	Mervue United	Longford, County Longford
19:30 GMT	O'Sullivan 37'	Report	Shanahan 41', 78'; Walsh 81'	Stadium: Bishopsgate; Attendance: 395; Referee: Andrew Mullally

3 August 2013 20	Cobh Ramblers	3–2	Mervue United	Cobh, County Cork
19:45 GMT	Rocks 38'; O'Neill 55'; Deady 90+1'	Report	Manning 72' (pen.), 86' (pen.)	Stadium: St Colman's Park; Attendance: 314; Referee: Simon Rogers

9 August 2013 21	Mervue United	0–0	Wexford Youths	Mervue, County Galway
19:45 GMT		Report		Stadium: Fahy's Field; Attendance: 150; Referee: Kevin O’Regan

16 August 2013 22	Mervue United	2–4	Athlone Town	Mervue, County Galway
19:45 GMT	Manning (penalty missed) 9'; Walsh 37'; King 62'; O'Mahoney (penalty missed) 85'	Report	Collins (red card) 9'; Gorman 32' (pen.), 41'; Curran 57', 67'; Skinner (red card) 84'	Stadium: Fahy's Field; Referee: Andrew Mullally

30 August 2013 23	Salthill Devon	0–1	Mervue United	Drom, County Galway
19:45 GMT	Geraghty (red card) 76'	Report	Shanahan 29'	Stadium: Drom Soccer Park; Attendance: 100; Referee: John McLoughlin

7 September 2013 24	Mervue United	1–0	Waterford United	Mervue, County Galway
16:30 GMT	Shanahan 83'	Report		Stadium: Fahy's Field; Attendance: 180; Referee: Rhona Daly

20 September 2013 25	Finn Harps	0–2	Mervue United	Ballybofey, County Donegal
20:00 GMT		Report	Molloy 5'; Manning 74'	Stadium: Finn Park; Attendance: 200; Referee: Conor Fitzgerald

27 September 2013 26	Mervue United	1–0	Longford Town	Mervue, County Galway
19:45 GMT	Duffy 32'	Report	Tracey (red card) 79'	Stadium: Fahy's Field; Attendance: 400; Referee: Andrew Mullally

4 October 2013 27	Mervue United	2–0	Cobh Ramblers	Mervue, County Galway
19:45 GMT	Shanahan 40'; Walsh 76' (pen.)	Report		Stadium: Fahy's Field; Attendance: 249; Referee: Ray Matthews

12 October 2013 28	Wexford Youths	1–4	Galway United	Crossabeg, County Wexford
19:45 GMT	Walshe 76'	Report	Shanahan 22', 69'; Walsh 31'; King 72'	Stadium: Ferrycarrig Park; Attendance: 150; Referee: Malcolm Spiteri

==== Play-offs ====
18 October 2013 First leg	Mervue United	1–0	Longford Town	Mervue, County Galway
19:45 GMT	Molloy 14'	Report	Tracey (red card) 26'	Stadium: Fahy's Field; Attendance: 607; Referee: Keith Callanan

25 October 2013 Second leg	Longford Town	3–2 (3–3 agg.) (3–0 p)	Mervue United	Longford, County Longford
19:45 GMT	Purdy 29'; O'Sullivan 66', 102'	Report	Molloy 7'; Manning (red card) 80'; Sinnott 120+2'	Stadium: Bishopsgate; Attendance: 999; Referee: Kevin O'Regan
	Penalties
	O'Sullivan (penalty scored); O'Brien (penalty scored); Connolly (penalty scored)		(penalty missed) Molloy; (penalty missed) Walsh; (penalty missed) O'Mahoney

=== FAI Cup ===
Win Draw Loss

31 May 2013 Second Round	Bray Wanderers	2–0	Mervue United	Bray, County Wicklow
19:45 GMT	Byrne 20', 25' (pen.)	Report		Stadium: Carlisle Grounds; Referee: Padraigh Sutton

=== League of Ireland Cup ===
Win Draw Loss

20 May 2013 Second Round	Sligo Rovers	4–0	Mervue United	Sligo, County Sligo
19:45 GMT	Elding 18' (pen.), 90+1'; McMillan 60'; Ventre 69'	Report	O'Mahoney (red card) 18'	Stadium: The Showgrounds; Attendance: 1,189; Referee: Tomas Connolly

=== Friendlies ===
Win Draw Loss

==== Pre-season Friendlies ====
21 January 2013	Mervue United	1–1	Irish Schools XI	Mervue, County Galway
	Murphy 72'	Report	Manning 83'	Stadium: Fahy's Field; Referee: John McLaughlin

3 February 2013	Limerick	0–0	Mervue United	Ennis, County Clare
		Report		Stadium: Cassidy Park

8 February 2013	UCD	0–1	Mervue United	Belfield, Dublin 4
		Report	Molloy 40'	Stadium: UCD Bowl; Referee: Paul Tuite

16 February 2013	Mervue United	1–1	Shelbourne	Mervue, County Galway
	Lavelle 57'	Report	Flynn (red card) 17'; Bayly (red card) 33'; Hughes 38'	Stadium: Fahy's Field; Referee: Trevor Conlon

27 February 2013	Bohemians	3–0	Mervue United	Phibsborough, Dublin 7
	Lyons 15'; Beuckley 17', 31'	Report		Stadium: Dalymount Park

== Statistics ==
=== Appearances and goals ===
This table shows all of the players who have featured in a first team squad for Mervue United this season
Brackets denotes how many of the listed appearances were made as a substitute

Pos.	Player	League		FAI Cup		LOI Cup		Play-offs		Total	
Pos.	Player	Apps	Goals	Apps	Goals	Apps	Goals	Apps	Goals	Apps	Goals
GK	(Republic of Ireland) Connor Gleeson	19(1)	0	1	0	2	0	0	0	22	0
GK	(Republic of Ireland) Conor O'Malley	6	0	0	0	0	0	2	0	8	0
GK	(Republic of Ireland) Brian O'Donoghue	3	0	0	0	0	0	0	0	3	0
GK	(Republic of Ireland) Ger Hanley	1	0	0	0	0	0	0	0	1	0
GK	(Republic of Ireland) Adrian Cronin	0	0	0	0	0	0	0	0	0	0
GK	(Republic of Ireland) Peter Healy	0	0	0	0	0	0	0	0	0	0
GK	(Poland) Konrad Kapusta	0	0	0	0	0	0	0	0	0	0
DF	(Republic of Ireland) Marc Ludden	25(1)	2	0	0	1	0	2	0	28	2
DF	(Republic of Ireland) Paul Sinnott	22	2	1	0	1	0	2	1	26	3
DF	(Republic of Ireland) Stephen Walsh	21(3)	7	1	0	1	0	2	0	25	7
DF	(Republic of Ireland) Martin Conneely	19	0	1(1)	0	1	0	1	0	22	0
DF	(Republic of Ireland) Michael McSweeney	15	0	1	0	2	0	0	0	18	0
DF	(Republic of Ireland) Joe Woods	14(4)	0	1	0	2	0	1(1)	0	18	0
DF	(Republic of Ireland) Ross Kenny	6	0	1	0	1	0		0	8	0
DF	(Republic of Ireland) Mike Elwood	5(1)	0	0	0	1(1)	0	0	0	6	0
DF	(Republic of Ireland) Kenny Farrell	2(2)	0	1(1)	0	1	0	0	0	4	0
DF	(Republic of Ireland) Michael James	0	0	0	0	0	0	0	0	0	0
DF	(Republic of Ireland) Keith McHugh	0	0	0	0	0	0	0	0	0	0
DF	(Republic of Ireland) Damian O'Rourke	0	0	0	0	0	0	0	0	0	0
MF	(Republic of Ireland) Noel Varley	25(2)	3	0	0	1(1)	0	1	0	27	3
MF	(Republic of Ireland) Tom King	22(3)	5	1	0	1	1	2	0	26	6
MF	(Republic of Ireland) Gary Curran	23(5)	1	0	0	2	0	1	0	26	1
MF	(Republic of Ireland) Gary Kelly	15(8)	0	1	0	2	0	0	0	18	0
MF	(Republic of Ireland) Barry O'Mahoney	12(2)	0	0	0	1	0	2	0	15	0
MF	(Republic of Ireland) Alex Lee	2(2)	0	0	0	2	0	1(1)	0	5	0
MF	(Zimbabwe) Oscar Sibanda	1(1)	0	0	0	1(1)	0	0	0	2	0
MF	(Republic of Ireland) Shane Keogh	1(1)	0	0	0	0	0	0	0	1	0
FW	(Republic of Ireland) Ryan Manning	26(1)	9	1(1)	0	1(1)	0	2	0	30	9
FW	(Republic of Ireland) Jason Molloy	25	5	1	0	0	0	2	2	28	7
FW	(Republic of Ireland) Gary Shanahan	23(7)	10	1	0	0	0	2	0	26	10
FW	(Republic of Ireland) Brendan Lavelle	20(9)	1	1	0	2	1	2(2)	0	25	2
FW	(Republic of Ireland) Michael Duffy	11(3)	1	0	0	0	0	2(1)	0	13	1
FW	(Republic of Ireland) Dillon Murphy	0	0	0	0	1(1)	0	0	0	1	0

=== Clean sheets ===
Player	League	FAI Cup	LOI Cup	Play-offs	Total	
Player	(Republic of Ireland) Connor Gleeson	7	0	0	0	7
(Republic of Ireland) Conor O'Malley	4	0	0	1	5	
(Republic of Ireland) Brian O'Donoghue	1	0	0	0	1	
(Republic of Ireland) Ger Hanley	1	0	0	0	1	
