= 2018 Galway United F.C. season =

Irish football club season

Galway United
2018 season
- Manager: Shane Keegan (until 18 June); Gary O'Connor (interim) (18 June–3 July); Alan Murphy (from 3 July)
- Stadium: Eamonn Deacy Park
- First Division: 6th
- FAI Cup: Second Round
- League of Ireland Cup: Second Round
- Top goalscorer: League: Conor Barry (10); All: Eoin McCormack (12)
Home colours	Away colours

The 2018 Galway United F.C. season was the football club's 40th season in the League of Ireland, their first season in the League of Ireland First Division having being relegated in 2017.

During the season manager Shane Keegan was sacked, going on to be replaced by Alan Murphy who operated as a player/manager having re-joined the club as a player at the start of the season.

The club finished the season in 6th, failing to make the play-offs. The clubb also made it to the second rounds of the FAI Cup and League of Ireland Cup.

== Squad ==
#	Name	Nationality	Position	Date of birth (age)	Previous Club	Signed	Notes
Goalkeepers
1	Tadhg Ryan	(Republic of Ireland)	GK	April 9, 1997 (aged 21)	(England) Huddersfield Town	2018	
16	Arek Mamala	(Poland)	GK	November 15, 1997 (aged 20)	(Republic of Ireland) Coole FC	2018	
25	Connor Gleeson	(Republic of Ireland)	GK	June 13, 1993 (aged 25)	(Republic of Ireland) Athlone Town	2018	
Defenders
2	Aaron Conway	(Republic of Ireland)	DF	December 7, 1997 (aged 20)	(Republic of Ireland) Arlington FC	2017	
3	Marc Ludden	(Republic of Ireland)	DF	February 28, 1990 (aged 28)	(Republic of Ireland) Mervue United	2014	
4	Robbie Williams	(England)	DF	October 2, 1984 (aged 33)	(Republic of Ireland) Cork City	2018	
5	Stephen Walsh	(Republic of Ireland)	DF	August 29, 1990 (aged 28)	(Republic of Ireland) Athlone Town	2018	
12	Maurice Nugent	(Republic of Ireland)	DF	July 30, 1998 (aged 20)	(Republic of Ireland) Mervue United	2017	
13	Christopher Horgan	(Republic of Ireland)	DF	October 27, 1999 (aged 18)	(Republic of Ireland) Salthill Devon	2018	
21	Adam Rooney	(Republic of Ireland)	DF	May 5, 2000 (aged 18)	(Republic of Ireland) Mervue United	2018	
23	Evan Murphy	(Republic of Ireland)	DF	March 1, 1999 (aged 19)	(Republic of Ireland) Salthill Devon	2016	
26	Mikey Whelan	(Republic of Ireland)	DF	May 7, 1999 (aged 19)	(Republic of Ireland) Mervue United	2018	
Midfielders
6	Alex Byrne	(Republic of Ireland)	MF	March 8, 1995 (aged 23)	(Republic of Ireland) Salthill Devon	2014	
7	Dara Mulgannon	(Republic of Ireland)	MF	September 18, 1998 (aged 20)	(Republic of Ireland) Mervue United	2018	
8	Conor Melody	(Republic of Ireland)	MF	March 15, 1997 (aged 21)	(Republic of Ireland) Salthill Devon	2015	
10	Ryan Connolly	(Republic of Ireland)	MF	January 13, 1992 (aged 26)	(Republic of Ireland) Shamrock Rovers	2018	Captain
14	Carlton Ubaezuonu	(South Africa)	MF	April 22, 1998 (aged 20)	(Republic of Ireland) Dundalk	2018	Loan
15	Conor Barry	(Republic of Ireland)	MF	September 2, 1995 (aged 23)	(Republic of Ireland) Athlone Town	2017	
17	Gary Shanahan	(Republic of Ireland)	MF	February 15, 1993 (aged 25)	(Republic of Ireland) Mervue United	2014	
18	Seán Russell	(Republic of Ireland)	MF	December 10, 1993 (aged 24)	(United States) Atlantic City	2018	
19	Alan Murphy	(Republic of Ireland)	MF	October 3, 1981 (aged 36)	(Republic of Ireland) West United	2018	player/coach
20	Ronan Manning	(Republic of Ireland)	MF	May 15, 2000 (aged 18)	(Republic of Ireland) Mervue United	2017	
22	Donal Higgins	(Republic of Ireland)	MF	September 10, 2001 (aged 17)	(Republic of Ireland) Maree Oranmore	2018	
24	Evan Coyne	(Republic of Ireland)	MF	February 7, 1999 (aged 19)	(Republic of Ireland) Salthill Devon	2018	
Forwards
9	Danny Furlong	(Republic of Ireland)	FW	November 6, 1988 (aged 29)	(New Zealand) Southern United	2018	
11	Eoin McCormack	(Republic of Ireland)	FW	June 8, 1995 (aged 23)	(Republic of Ireland) Ballinasloe Town	2017	
12	Colin Kelly	(Republic of Ireland)	FW	November 22, 2001 (aged 16)	(Republic of Ireland) Mervue United	2018	
18	Conor Layng	(Republic of Ireland)	FW	May 12, 1999 (aged 19)	(Republic of Ireland) Athlone Town	2018	
22	Wilson Waweru	(Republic of Ireland)	FW	December 27, 2000 (aged 17)	(Republic of Ireland) Mervue United	2018	
23	Dara Costelloe	(Republic of Ireland)	FW	December 11, 2002 (aged 15)	(Republic of Ireland) Aisling Annacotty	2018	
Players who departed before the end of the season
7	Stephen Kenny	(Republic of Ireland)	MF	May 14, 1993 (aged 25)	(Republic of Ireland) Limerick	2018	
13	Gary Kineen	(Republic of Ireland)	MF	July 1, 1997 (aged 20)	(Republic of Ireland) Salthill Devon	2016	

=== In ===
Date	Position	Nationality	Name	Last club	Ref.
13 December 2017	MF	(Republic of Ireland)	Ryan Connolly	(Republic of Ireland) Shamrock Rovers	
2 January 2018	DF	(Republic of Ireland)	Stephen Walsh	(Republic of Ireland) Athlone Town	
12 January 2018	GK	(Republic of Ireland)	Tadhg Ryan	(England) Huddersfield Town	
19 January 2018	DF	(England)	Robbie Williams	(Republic of Ireland) Cork City	
31 January 2018	GK	(Poland)	Arek Mamala	(Republic of Ireland) Coole FC	
31 January 2018	GK	(Republic of Ireland)	Connor Gleeson	(Republic of Ireland) Athlone Town	
1 February 2018	MF	(Republic of Ireland)	Alan Murphy	(Republic of Ireland) West United	
14 February 2018	MF	(Republic of Ireland)	Stephen Kenny	(Republic of Ireland) Limerick	
21 February 2018	FW	(Republic of Ireland)	Danny Furlong	(New Zealand) Southern United	
8 August 2018	MF	(Republic of Ireland)	Seán Russell	(United States) Atlantic City	

==== Out ====
Date	Position	Nationality	Name	To	Ref.
9 November 2017	DF	(Republic of Ireland)	Colm Horgan	(Republic of Ireland) Cork City	
9 November 2017	MF	(Republic of Ireland)	Rory Hale	(Republic of Ireland) Derry City	
16 November 2017	MF	(Republic of Ireland)	David Cawley	(Republic of Ireland) Sligo Rovers	
24 November 2017	DF	(Republic of Ireland)	Stephen Folan	(Republic of Ireland) Dundalk	
28 November 2017	FW	(Republic of Ireland)	Ronan Murray	(Republic of Ireland) Dundalk	
8 December 2017	MF	(Republic of Ireland)	Kevin Devaney	(Republic of Ireland) Bohemians	
18 December 2017	MF	(Republic of Ireland)	Gavan Holohan	(Republic of Ireland) Waterford	
22 February 2018	MF	(Isle of Man)	Declan Sharkey	(Republic of Ireland) Letterkenny Rovers	
23 February 2018	DF	(England)	Niall Maher	(England) AFC Telford United	

==== Loan In ====
Date	Position	Nationality	Name	From	Date until	Ref.
16 January 2018	MF	(South Africa)	Carlton Ubaezuonu	(Republic of Ireland) Dundalk	1 November 2018 (Note: Ubaezuonu's loan deal was originally schedueled to end on 31 June, however it was extended to 1 November during the season)	

== Club ==
=== Coaching staff ===
==== Shane Keegan (until 18 June) ====
- Manager: Shane Keegan
- Assistant Manager: Gary O'Connor
- Goalkeeping Coach: Leo Tierney
- Strength and Conditioning Coach: Johnny O'Connor
- Physiotherapist: Kevin D'Arcy

==== Alan Murphy (from 3 July) ====
- Manager: Alan Murphy
- Assistant Manager: Mark Herrick
- First Team Coach: Johnny Glynn
- Physiotherapist: Ronan Coyle

== Competitions ==
=== League of Ireland First Division ===
==== League Table ====
Pos	Team	Pld	W	D	L	GF	GA	GD	Pts	Qualification
4	Drogheda United (Q)	27	14	7	6	50	27	+23	49	Qualification for Promotion play-offs
5	Longford Town	27	13	6	8	54	36	+18	45	
6	Galway United	27	10	7	10	41	36	+5	37	
7	Cabinteely	27	9	3	15	32	45	−13	30	
8	Cobh Ramblers	27	8	5	14	24	41	−17	29	

Source: SSE Airtricity League, Soccerway
Rules for classification: 1) Points; 2) Goal difference; 3) Goals scored.
(Q) Qualified for the phase indicated

==== Results summary ====
Overall								Home						Away					
Pld	W	D	L	GF	GA	GD	Pts	W	D	L	GF	GA	GD	W	D	L	GF	GA	GD
27	10	7	10	41	36	+5	37	7	2	4	27	16	+11	3	5	6	14	20	−6

==== Matches ====
Win Draw Loss

23 February 2018 1	Galway United	4–1	Athlone Town	Terryland, County Galway
19:45 GMT	Furlong 13', 33', 80'; Manning 59'	Report	Bape 90+3'	Stadium: Eamonn Deacy Park; Attendance: 1,198; Referee: David Keeler

9 March 2018 2	UCD	1–1	Galway United	Belfield, Dublin 4
19:45 GMT	Collins 32'	Report	Furlong 22'	Stadium: UCD Bowl; Attendance: 296; Referee: John McLoughlin

16 March 2018 3	Galway United	3–1	Cabinteely	Terryland, County Galway
19:45 GMT	Furlong 41', 68'; Barry 60'	Report	Doyle 87'; Lotefa (red card) 90'	Stadium: Eamonn Deacy Park; Attendance: 725; Referee: Garvin Taggart

23 March 2018 4	Drogheda United	2–2	Galway United	Drogheda, County Louth
19:45 GMT	Doyle 59'; Deasy (red card) 76'; Gallagher 83'	Report	McCormack 37', 39'	Stadium: United Park; Attendance: 494; Referee: Adriano Reale

30 March 2018 5	Galway United	0–0	Longford Town	Terryland, County Galway
19:45 GMT		Report		Stadium: Eamonn Deacy Park; Attendance: 1,029; Referee: Damien MacGraith

13 April 2018 6	Galway United	4–1	Wexford	Terryland, County Galway
19:45 GMT	Furlong 62'; Murphy 67' (pen.); Ubaezuonu 69'; McCormack 87'	Report	Dobbs 28'; Kenny (red card) 66'	Stadium: Eamonn Deacy Park; Attendance: 847; Referee: Paula Brady

20 April 2018 7	Shelbourne	2–0	Galway United	Drumcondra, Dublin 3
19:45 GMT	Byrne 42'; O'Sullivan 74'	Report		Stadium: Tolka Park; Attendance: 761; Referee: Eoghan O’Shea

27 April 2018 8	Galway United	3–0	Cobh Ramblers	Terryland, County Galway
19:45 GMT	Barry 17', 22'; Murphy 45' (pen.)	Report		Stadium: Eamonn Deacy Park; Attendance: 743; Referee: Tom Dempsey

4 May 2018 9	Athlone Town	0–3	Galway United	Lissywollen, Athlone
19:45 GMT		Report	McCormack 38'; Ludden 56'; Kenny 77'	Stadium: Athlone Town Stadium; Attendance: 291; Referee: David Dunne

7 May 2018 10	Finn Harps	1–0	Galway United	Ballybofey, County Donegal
17:00 GMT	Devers 90'	Report		Stadium: Finn Park; Attendance: 655; Referee: Paul McLaughlin

11 May 2018 11	Galway United	2–0	UCD	Terryland, County Galway
19:45 GMT	Connolly 76'	Report	Kearns 11' (o.g.)	Stadium: Eamonn Deacy Park; Attendance: 845; Referee: Eoghan O’Shea

20 May 2018 12	Cabinteely	1–2	Galway United	Blackrock, Dublin 18
15:00 GMT	Dalton 88'	Report	Williams 9'; Ludden 39'	Stadium: Stradbrook Road; Attendance: 245; Referee: Jason Mannix

25 May 2018 13	Galway United	0–1	Drogheda United	Terryland, County Galway
19:45 GMT		Report	Brennan 76'	Stadium: Eamonn Deacy Park; Attendance: 838; Referee: Adriano Reale

1 June 2018 14	Longford Town	3–2	Galway United	Longford, County Longford
19:45 GMT	Dervin 7'; Verdon 45'; Meenan (red card) 45'; Chambers 80'	Report	Barry 56'; Walsh 87'	Stadium: Bishopsgate; Attendance: 410; Referee: Thomas Dempsey

4 June 2018 15	Cobh Ramblers	0–0	Galway United	Cobh, County Cork
19:15 GMT		Report		Stadium: St Colman's Park; Attendance: 375; Referee: Sean Grant

8 June 2018 16	Galway United	1–2	Finn Harps	Terryland, County Galway
19:45 GMT	Barry 90+3'	Report	Devers 11'; Timlin 52'	Stadium: Eamonn Deacy Park; Attendance: 734; Referee: John McLoughlin

15 June 2018 17	Wexford	0–0	Galway United	Crossabeg, County Wexford
20:00 GMT		Report		Stadium: Ferrycarrig Park; Attendance: 145; Referee: Andrew Mulally

29 June 2018 18	Galway United	1–2	Shelbourne	Terryland, County Galway
19:45 GMT	McCormack 90'	Report	Evans 54'; English 58' (pen.)	Stadium: Eamonn Deacy Park; Attendance: 708; Referee: Damien MacGraith

6 July 2018 19	Galway United	4–1	Athlone Town	Terryland, County Galway
19:45 GMT	Barry 20'; Ubaezuonu 45'; McCormack 80'; Manning 88'	Report	Grogan (penalty missed) 47'; Kalandarishvili 90'	Stadium: Eamonn Deacy Park; Attendance: 435; Referee: Eoghan O'Shea

14 July 2018 20	Cobh Ramblers	1–2	Galway United	Cobh, County Cork
19:45 GMT	Kenny 79'	Report	Barry 18'; McCormack 20'	Stadium: St Colman's Park; Attendance: 277; Referee: Alan Carey

20 July 2018 21	UCD	2–0	Galway United	Belfield, Dublin 4
19:45 GMT	O'Connor 56'; Mahdy 63'	Report	McCormack (penalty missed) 6'	Stadium: UCD Bowl; Attendance: 245; Referee: Rob Hennessy

27 July 2018 22	Galway United	3–2	Cabinteely	Terryland, County Galway
19:45 GMT	McCormack 2'; Barry 39', 54'	Report	Doyle 37'; Waters 85'	Stadium: Eamonn Deacy Park; Attendance: 581; Referee: Eoghan O'Shea

3 August 2018 23	Drogheda United	2–2	Galway United	Drogheda, County Louth
19:45 GMT	Doyle 59'; Brennan 57'	Report	McCormack 17'; Barry 27'	Stadium: United Park; Attendance: 364; Referee: Adriano Reale

17 August 2018 24	Galway United	1–4	Longford Town	Terryland, County Galway
19:45 GMT	Ubaezuonu 90'	Report	Doyle 15', 49'; McGlade 54', 78'	Stadium: Eamonn Deacy Park; Attendance: 576; Referee: David Keeler

31 August 2018 25	Finn Harps	2–0	Galway United	Ballybofey, County Donegal
20:00 GMT	Place 17'; Timlin 66'	Report		Stadium: Finn Park; Attendance: 966; Referee: Eoghan O'Shea

14 September 2018 26	Galway United	1–1	Wexford	Terryland, County Galway
19:45 GMT	Ubaezuonu 61'; Kelly (penalty missed) 86'	Report	George 43'	Stadium: Eamonn Deacy Park; Attendance: 591; Referee: Jason Mannix

22 September 2018 27	Shelbourne	3–0	Galway United	Drumcondra, Dublin 3
19:45 GMT	English 4'; Moorhouse 56'; McEnteer 78'	Report		Stadium: Tolka Park; Attendance: 534; Referee: Garvin Taggart

=== FAI Cup ===
Win Draw Loss

11 August 2018 First Round	North End United	0–4	Galway United	Crossabeg, County Wexford
19:45 GMT		Report	McCormack 9', 43', 44'; Barry 14'	Stadium: Ferrycarrig Park; Referee: Eoghan O'Shea

24 August 2018 Second Round	Galway United	0–2	Bohemians	Terryland, County Galway
19:45 GMT		Report	Leahy 5'; Lunney (penalty missed) 49'; Stokes 77'	Stadium: Eamonn Deacy Park; Attendance: 733; Referee: Rob Hennessy

=== League of Ireland Cup ===
Win Draw Loss

19 March 2018 First Round	Galway United	1–0	Cockhill Celtic	Terryland, County Galway
17:00 GMT		Report	Gill 50' (o.g.); Bradley (red card) 78'	Stadium: Eamonn Deacy Park; Attendance: 400; Referee: John McLoughlin

2 April 2019 Second Round	Galway United	0–1	Sligo Rovers	Terryland, County Galway
17:00 GMT		Report	Morgan 81'	Stadium: Eamonn Deacy Park; Referee: Raymond Matthews

=== Friendlies ===
Win Draw Loss

==== Pre-season Friendlies ====
20 January 2018	Limerick	0–0	Galway United	Limerick, County Limerick
		Report		Stadium: University of Limerick

26 January 2018	Sligo Rovers	2–0	Galway United	Sligo, County Sligo
	Sharkey 27'; Wixted 85'	Report		Stadium: The Showgrounds

9 February 2018	Galway United	0–2	Bohemians	Terryland, County Galway
		Report	Manley 16'; Ward 29'	Stadium: Eamonn Deacy Park; Attendance: 150; Referee: Marc Lynch

16 February 2018	Shelbourne	0–1	Galway United	Drumcondra, Dublin 3
		Report	Kenny 77'	Stadium: Tolka Park

== Statistics ==
=== Appearances and goals ===
This table shows all of the players who have featured in a first team squad for Galway United this season
Brackets denotes how many of the listed appearances were made as a substitute

No.	Pos.	Player	League		FAI Cup		LOI Cup		Total	
No.	Pos.	Player	Apps	Goals	Apps	Goals	Apps	Goals	Apps	Goals
1	GK	(Republic of Ireland) Tadhg Ryan	23	0	2	0	1	0	26	0
2	DF	(Republic of Ireland) Aaron Conway	7(3)	0	2(1)	0	1	0	10	0
3	DF	(Republic of Ireland) Marc Ludden	23	2	2	0	2	0	27	2
4	DF	(England) Robbie Williams	19	1	2	0	0	0	21	1
5	DF	(Republic of Ireland) Stephen Walsh	26(1)	1	2	0	2	0	30	1
6	MF	(Republic of Ireland) Alex Byrne	22(3)	0	0	0	1	0	23	0
7	MF	(Republic of Ireland) Stephen Kenny	15(6)	1	0	0	2(1)	0	17	1
7	MF	(Republic of Ireland) Dara Mulgannon	1	0	1(1)	0	0	0	2	0
8	MF	(Republic of Ireland) Conor Melody	14(6)	0	1(1)	0	2(1)	0	17	0
9	FW	(Republic of Ireland) Danny Furlong	15(5)	7	0	0	0	0	15	7
10	MF	(Republic of Ireland) Ryan Connolly	26	1	2	0	2(1)	0	30	1
11	FW	(Republic of Ireland) Eoin McCormack	24	9	2	3	1	0	27	12
12	DF	(Republic of Ireland) Maurice Nugent	14(2)	0	0	0	1	0	15	0
12	FW	(Republic of Ireland) Colin Kelly	3(2)	0	0	0	0	0	3	0
13	MF	(Republic of Ireland) Gary Kineen	0	0	0	0	1(1)	0	1	0
13	DF	(Republic of Ireland) Christopher Horgan	6(1)	0	2	0	0	0	8	0
14	MF	(South Africa) Carlton Ubaezuonu	26(13)	4	1	0	0	0	27	4
15	MF	(Republic of Ireland) Conor Barry	26(6)	10	2	1	1	0	29	11
16	GK	(Poland) Arek Mamala	0	0	0	0	1	0	1	0
17	MF	(Republic of Ireland) Gary Shanahan	23	0	0	0	1	0	24	0
18	MF	(Republic of Ireland) Seán Russell	3(1)	0	2	0	0	0	5	0
18	FW	(Republic of Ireland) Conor Layng	7(5)	0	0	0	2(1)	0	9	0
19	MF	(Republic of Ireland) Alan Murphy	16(4)	2	1	0	2	0	19	2
20	MF	(Republic of Ireland) Ronan Manning	8(4)	2	0	0	2(1)	0	10	2
21	DF	(Republic of Ireland) Adam Rooney	5	0	0	0	2	0	7	0
22	FW	(Republic of Ireland) Wilson Waweru	3(3)	0	2(2)	0	0	0	5	0
22	MF	(Republic of Ireland) Donal Higgins	3(2)	0	0	0	0	0	3	0
23	DF	(Republic of Ireland) Evan Murphy	0	0	1	0	0	0	1	0
23	FW	(Republic of Ireland) Dara Costelloe	2(1)	0	0	0	0	0	2	0
24	MF	(Republic of Ireland) Evan Coyne	5(4)	0	0	0	2(1)	0	7	0
25	GK	(Republic of Ireland) Connor Gleeson	4	0	0	0	1(1)	0	5	0
26	DF	(Republic of Ireland) Mikey Whelan	0	0	0	0	0	0	0	0

=== Clean sheets ===
No.	Player	League	FAI Cup	LOI Cup	Total		
No.	Player	1	(Republic of Ireland) Tadhg Ryan	4	1	0	5
16	(Poland) Arek Mamala	0	0	1	1		
25	(Republic of Ireland) Connor Gleeson	2	1	0	3		

=== Disciplinary record ===
No.	Player	League			FAI Cup			LOI Cup			Total		
No.	Player	Yellow card	(yellow card) (yellow-red card)	Red card	Yellow card	(yellow card) (yellow-red card)	Red card	Yellow card	(yellow card) (yellow-red card)	Red card	Yellow card	(yellow card) (yellow-red card)	Red card
6	Alex Byrne	8	0	0	0	0	0	0	0	0	8	0	0
5	Stephen Walsh	5	0	0	0	0	0	1	0	0	6	0	0
10	Ryan Connolly	4	0	0	0	0	0	0	0	0	4	0	0
3	Marc Ludden	2	0	0	1	0	0	0	0	0	3	0	0
12	Maurice Nugent	3	0	0	0	0	0	0	0	0	3	0	0
19	Alan Murphy	3	0	0	0	0	0	0	0	0	3	0	0
2	Aaron Conway	2	0	0	0	0	0	0	0	0	2	0	0
8	Conor Melody	2	0	0	0	0	0	0	0	0	2	0	0
11	Eoin McCormack	2	0	0	0	0	0	0	0	0	2	0	0
21	Adam Rooney	1	0	0	0	0	0	1	0	0	2	0	0
4	Robbie Williams	0	0	0	1	0	0	0	0	0	1	0	0
7	Stephen Kenny	1	0	0	0	0	0	0	0	0	1	0	0
14	Carlton Ubaezuonu	1	0	0	0	0	0	0	0	0	0	0	0
17	Gary Shanahan	1	0	0	0	0	0	0	0	0	1	0	0
Totals		35	0	0	2	0	0	2	0	0	39	0	0
