= 2015 League of Ireland Cup final =

- Event: 2015 League of Ireland Cup
Galway United	St Patrick's Athletic
0	0
- St Patrick's Athletic won 4–3 on penalties
- Date: 19 September 2015
- Venue: Eamonn Deacy Park, Galway
- Man of the Match: Conor O'Malley
- Referee: Paul McLaughlin
- Attendance: 3,662

The 2015 League of Ireland Cup final was the final match of the 2015 League of Ireland Cup, played between Galway United and St Patrick's Athletic. The match was played on 19 September 2015 at 6.05 pm. The game played out as a 0–0 draw after 120 minutes, with Pats' young goalkeeper Conor O'Malley's save winning the cup 4-3 on penalties for the Inchicore side.

== Background ==
Galway's route to the final involved them being drawn at home in every round and beating Finn Harps, Cockhill Celtic, Bohemians and Dundalk. St Pat's however were drawn away from home in every round and knocked out Crumlin United, Cork City and Shamrock Rovers en route to the final.

=== Route to the final ===
Galway United		Round	St Patrick's Athletic	
Opponent	Score	Round	Opponent	Score
Finn Harps	3–2 (H)	First round	-	
Cockhill Celtic	4–2 (H)	Second round	Crumlin United	4–1 (A)
Bohemians	1–0 (H) (a.e.t.)	Quarter-finals	Cork City	1–1 (A) (5–3 p)
Dundalk	0–0 (H) (4–2 p)	Semi-finals	Shamrock Rovers	0–0 (A) (4–2 p)
Note: In all results above, the score of the finalist is given first (H: home; A: away).

== Match ==
19 September 2015
18:05 GMT

Galway United	0–0 (a.e.t.)	St Patrick's Athletic
Andy O'Connell (yellow card) 114'		Greg Bolger (yellow card) 88'
Penalties
Ryan Connolly (penalty scored); Jake Keegan (penalty missed); Stephen Walsh (penalty scored); Colm Horgan (penalty scored); Andy O'Connell (penalty missed)	3–4	Conan Byrne (penalty scored); James Chambers (penalty scored); Christy Fagan (penalty scored); Ian Morris (penalty scored); Sean Hoare (penalty missed)

Eamonn Deacy Park
Attendance: 3,662
Referee: Paul McLaughlin

Galway United	St Patrick's Athletic

GK	25	(England) Conor Winn
RB	2	(Republic of Ireland) Colm Horgan
CB	5	(Republic of Ireland) Kilian Cantwell
CB	24	(England) Sam Oji	(substituted off) 103'
LB	3	(Republic of Ireland) Marc Ludden
RM	17	(Republic of Ireland) Gary Shanahan
CM	6	(Republic of Ireland) Paul Sinnott (c)
CM	10	(Republic of Ireland) Ryan Connolly
LM	11	(Republic of Ireland) Jason Molloy	(substituted off) 74'
ST	12	(United States) Jake Keegan
ST	9	(Republic of Ireland) Enda Curran	(substituted off) 112'
Substitutes:
GK	1	(Republic of Ireland) Ger Hanley
LM	7	(Republic of Ireland) Stephen Walsh	(substituted on) 74'
CB	13	(Republic of Ireland) Cormac Raftery
ST	19	(Republic of Ireland) Andy O'Connell	(substituted on) 103'
CM	20	(Republic of Ireland) Conor Melody	(substituted on) 112'
CM	21	(Republic of Ireland) Conor Barry
RM	28	(Finland) Tomi Saarelma
Manager:
(Republic of Ireland) Tommy Dunne

GK	16	(Republic of Ireland) Conor O'Malley
RB	2	(Republic of Ireland) Ger O'Brien (c)
CB	15	(Republic of Ireland) Kenny Browne
CB	5	(Republic of Ireland) Seán Hoare
LB	12	(Republic of Ireland) Lee Desmond
CM	14	(Republic of Ireland) James Chambers
CM	6	(Republic of Ireland) Greg Bolger
CM	11	(Republic of Ireland) Killian Brennan	(substituted off) 91'
RW	7	(Republic of Ireland) Conan Byrne
ST	8	(United States) Morgan Langley	(substituted off) 77'
LW	20	(Republic of Ireland) Aaron Greene	(substituted off) 113'
Substitutes:
GK	25	(England) Pat Jennings
CB	4	(Republic of Ireland) Jason McGuinness
ST	9	(Republic of Ireland) Christy Fagan	(substituted on) 77'
CM	18	(Republic of Ireland) Sam Verdon
LM	19	(Republic of Ireland) Jamie McGrath	(substituted on) 91'
CM	26	(Republic of Ireland) Jack Bayly
CM	27	(Republic of Ireland) Ian Morris	(substituted on) 113'
Manager:
(Republic of Ireland) Liam Buckley

== See also ==
- 2015 FAI Cup
- 2015 League of Ireland
- 2015 League of Ireland Cup
