= Conor O'Malley =

Irish footballer

Personal information
- Full name: Conor O'Malley
- Date of birth: 1 August 1994 (age 32)
- Place of birth: Westport, Ireland
- Position: Goalkeeper

Youth career
- 2006–2011: Westport United
- 2011–2012: Mervue United
- 2012–2013: Salthill Devon

Senior career*
Years	Team	Apps	(Gls)
2011	Mervue United	2	(0)
2012–2013	Salthill Devon	0	(0)
2013	Mervue United	8	(0)
2014	Shamrock Rovers B	15	(0)
2015–2017	St Patrick's Athletic	41	(0)
2017–2020	Peterborough United	23	(0)
- * Club domestic league appearances and goals as of 13:44, 26 March 2019 (UTC)

Conor O'Malley (born 1 August 1994) is an Irish former professional footballer who played as a goalkeeper.

== Career ==
O'Malley began his career with his local club Westport United in their youth team. He played for Mervue United's under 19 side for the 2011–12 season, making 2 appearances for the first team in the League of Ireland First Division. He played for Salthill Devon's under 19's for the 2012–13 season before returning to Mervue's first team, playing 8 games in the 2013 season.

In January 2014 O'Malley joined Shamrock Rovers' B team, he played 15 times for them and also made the bench for the First Team 3 times. As a result, after another year he joined St Patrick's Athletic ahead of the 2015 season. He won the 2015 League of Ireland Cup for the club, by saving 2 penalties against Galway United in the final. He played in the 2016 League of Ireland Cup Final also, as Pat's won 4–1 against Limerick to retain the title. In his 48 games for them he gained a reputation attracting the likes of Leeds United, Peterborough United and Rangers.

On 7 August 2017, O'Malley joined his old Pat's teammate Chris Forrester at League 1 side Peterborough United for an undisclosed fee expected to be in the region of €100,000, and made his debut in a 2–0 victory against Southampton Under-21s in the EFL Trophy. He had a contract option exercised by Peterborough at the end of the 2018–19 season and left the club at the end oh his contract on 30 June 2020 after playing 28 games for the Posh. In April 2020, he had announced that he would be retiring from football upon the conclusion of his contract in order to return home and begin working in the financial sector.

== Career statistics ==
As of 21 April 2022

Appearances and goals by club, season and competition
Club	Season	League			National Cup		League Cup		Other		Total	
Club	Season	Division	Apps	Goals	Apps	Goals	Apps	Goals	Apps	Goals	Apps	Goals
Mervue United	2011	League of Ireland First Division	2	0	0	0	0	0	—		2	0
Salthill Devon	2012	League of Ireland First Division	0	0	0	0	0	0	—		0	0
Mervue United	2013	League of Ireland First Division	8	0	0	0	0	0	—		8	0
Mervue United	Mervue United total		10	0	0	0	0	0	—		10	0
Shamrock Rovers B	2014	League of Ireland First Division	15	0	—		—		—		15	0
St Patrick's Athletic	2015	League of Ireland Premier Division	17	0	0	0	3	0	1	0	21	0
St Patrick's Athletic	2016	League of Ireland Premier Division	3	0	0	0	2	0	1	0	6	0
St Patrick's Athletic	2017	League of Ireland Premier Division	21	0	0	0	0	0	0	0	21	0
St Patrick's Athletic	St Patrick's Athletic total		41	0	0	0	5	0	2	0	48	0
Peterborough United	2017–18	EFL League One	9	0	2	0	0	0	3 (Note: Appearance in the EFL Trophy)	0	14	0
Peterborough United	2018–19	EFL League One	14	0	2	0	0	0	4	0	20	0
Peterborough United	2019–20	EFL League One	0	0	0	0	0	0	0	0	0	0
Peterborough United	Peterborough United total		23	0	4	0	0	0	7	0	34	0
Career total			89	0	4	0	5	0	9	0	107	0

== Honours ==
=== Club ===
- League of Ireland Cup: (2)
  - St Patrick's Athletic — 2015, 2016
