= 2013 League of Ireland First Division =

League of Ireland First Division
- Season: 2013
- Champions: Athlone Town
- Matches: 112
- Goals: 308 (2.75 per match)
- Top goalscorer: David O'Sullivan: 21 (Longford Town)

The 2013 League of Ireland First Division season was the 29th season of the League of Ireland First Division. The First Division was contested by 8 teams and Athlone Town won the title.

== Teams ==
Locations of the First Division teams

Team	Location	Stadium
Athlone Town	Athlone	Athlone Town Stadium
Cobh Ramblers	Cobh	St. Colman's Park
Finn Harps	Ballybofey	Finn Park
Longford Town	Longford	City Calling Stadium
Mervue United	Galway	Fahy's Field
Salthill Devon	Salthill	Drom Soccer Park
Waterford United	Waterford	Waterford RSC
Wexford Youths	Wexford	Ferrycarrig Park

== Overview ==
The 2013 First Division featured eight teams. Each team played every other team twice, totalling 28 games.

== Final table ==
Pos	Team	Pld	W	D	L	GF	GA	GD	Pts	Promotion or relegation
1	Athlone Town (C, P)	28	16	7	5	42	22	+20	55	Promoted to Premier Division
2	Longford Town	28	15	5	8	55	34	+21	50	Lost promotion/relegation play-offs
3	Mervue United (Note: Mervue United and Salthill Devon withdrew from the league to make way for Galway F.C. after the FAI declared that Galway city and County Galway should be represented in the League of Ireland by a single club.)	28	14	7	7	46	31	+15	49	Lost promotion/relegation play-offs
4	Waterford United	28	14	5	9	40	24	+16	47	
5	Wexford Youths	28	10	3	15	29	47	−18	33	
6	Finn Harps	28	8	7	13	31	42	−11	31	
7	Cobh Ramblers (Note: Cobh Ramblers replaced Monaghan United as members of the League of Ireland.)	28	8	7	13	42	54	−12	31	
8	Salthill Devon	28	4	5	19	23	54	−31	17	Withdrew from league.

(C) Champions; (P) Promoted

== Results ==
=== Matches 1–14 ===
Home \ Away	ATH	COB	FHA	LON	MER	SAL	WAT	WEX
Athlone Town		1–1	1–0	2–0	0–0	3–3	0–1	4–0
Cobh Ramblers	1–1		2–2	3–4	5–3	1–2	3–0	5–0
Finn Harps	2–3	4–1		1–0	1–0	1–0	0–1	0–0
Longford Town	2–1	5–1	2–3		1–1	2–1	2–1	3–1
Mervue United	2–2	1–0	2–2	1–2		2–1	2–1	4–1
Salthill Devon	1–2	1–1	2–1	0–5	0–0		1–2	1–2
Waterford United	1–0	0–0	1–1	1–1	0–4	3–2		0–1
Wexford Youths	0–2	3–0	2–1	0–1	2–0	3–0	2–1	

Legend: Blue = home team win; Yellow = draw; Red = away team win.

=== Matches 15–28 ===
Home \ Away	ATH	COB	FHA	LON	MER	SAL	WAT	WEX
Athlone Town		0–0	1–0	1–2	3–0	1–0	1–0	1–0
Cobh Ramblers	0–1		3–2	4–3	3–2	1–0	2–1	3–0
Finn Harps	3–2	2–2		0–0	0–2	2–0	0–2	1–0
Longford Town	0–1	7–2	3–1		1–3	4–0	2–1	2–1
Mervue United	2–4	2–0	4–0	1–0		2–1	1–0	0–0
Salthill Devon	0–1	1–0	0–0	1–1	0–1		1–4	3–2
Waterford United	1–1	1–0	3–0	1–0	0–0	5–0		4–0
Wexford Youths	0–2	3–1	3–1	0–0	1–4	2–1	0–2	

Legend: Blue = home team win; Yellow = draw; Red = away team win.

== Promotion/relegation play-off ==
The second and third placed First Division teams, Longford Town and Mervue United, played off to decide who would play Bray Wanderers, the eleventh placed team from the Premier Division. The winner of this play off would play in the 2014 Premier Division.

First Division

18 October 2013	Mervue United	1–0	Longford Town	Fahy's Field
19:45	Jason Molloy 14'	Report	Corie Treacy (red card) 26'	Attendance: 607; Referee: Keith Callanan

25 October 2013	Longford Town	3 – 2 (a.e.t.) (3–0 p)	Mervue United	City Calling Stadium
19:45	Daniel Purdy 29'; David O'Sullivan 66', 102'	Report	Jason Molloy 7'; Paul Sinnott 120+2'; Ryan Manning (red card) 80'	Attendance: 999; Referee: Kevin O'Regan (Kerry)
	Penalties
	David O'Sullivan (penalty scored); Derek O'Brien (penalty scored); Ryan Connolly (penalty scored)		(penalty missed) Jason Molloy; (penalty missed) Stephen Walsh; (penalty missed) Barry O'Mahony

The play-off finished 3–3 on aggregate. Longford Town won 3–0 on penalties

First Division v Premier Division

28 October 2013	Bray Wanderers	2–2	Longford Town	Carlisle Grounds
19.45	Jason Byrne 8', 31'	Report	Dean Ebbe 61'; David O'Sullivan 83'	Attendance: 900 (estimated); Referee: Graham Kelly

1 November 2013	Longford Town	2–3	Bray Wanderers	City Calling Stadium
19.45	Daniel Purdy 58', 79'; Noel Haverty (red card) 90+2'	Report	Gary Dempsey 3'; Kieran Waters 73'; Kevin O'Connor 86'; Shane O'Connor (red card) 90+2'	Attendance: unknown Referee: Derek Tomney (Dublin)

Bray Wanderers win 5–4 on aggregate and retained their place in the Premier Division.

== Goal scorers ==
=== Top scorers ===
As of 21 October 2013.

Rank	Player	Club	Goals
1	David O'Sullivan	Longford Town	21
2	Conor Meade	Waterford United	17
2	Philip Gorman	Athlone Town	17
4	Enda Curran	Athlone Town	12
5	Gary Shanahan	Mervue United	10

=== Hat-Tricks ===
Player	For	Against	Result	Date
David O'Sullivan	Longford Town	SD Galway	5–0	8 March 2013
Enda Curran	Salthill Devon	Athlone Town	3–3	29 March 2013
Conor Meade	Cobh Ramblers	Mervue United	5–3	13 April 2013
Philip Gorman	Athlone Town	Mervue United	3–0	28 June 2013

== Awards ==
=== Player of the Year ===
Winner	Club
Philip Gorman	Athlone Town

=== Team of the Year ===
No.	Pos.	Player	Date of birth (age)	Caps	Club
1	GK	Paul Skinner			Athlone Town
2	DF	Gavin Kavanagh			Waterford United
3	DF	Aidan Collins			Athlone Town
4	DF	Noel Haverty			Longford Town
5	DF	Tom King			Mervue United
6	MF	Barry O'Mahony			Mervue United
7	MF	Mark Hughes			Athlone Town
8	MF	Graham Kelly			Athlone Town
9	MF	Ryan Manning			Mervue United
10	FW	Philip Gorman			Athlone Town
11	FW	David O'Sullivan			Longford Town

== See also ==
- 2013 League of Ireland Premier Division
- 2013 League of Ireland Cup
