= Gary Shanahan =

Irish footballer (born 1993)

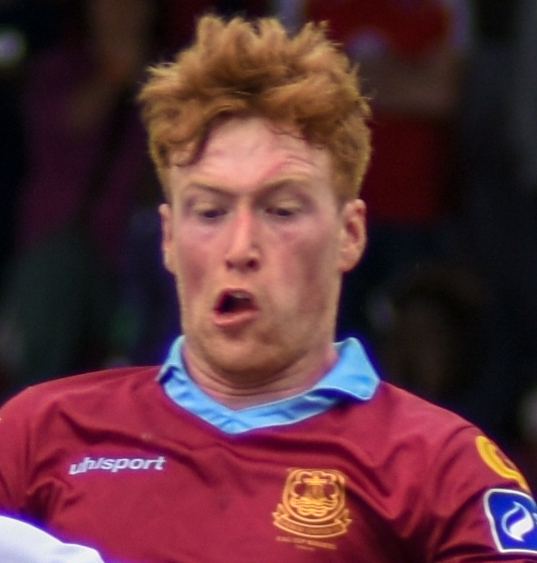
- Shanahan in action for Galway United against Sligo Rovers in 2016

Personal information
- Date of birth: 15 February 1993 (age 33)
- Place of birth: Newcastle West, County Limerick
- Height: 1.83 m (6 ft 0 in)
- Position: Winger

Youth career
- Newcastle West

Senior career*
Years	Team	Apps	(Gls)
2012	Dundalk	22	(5)
2013	Mervue United	23	(10)
2014–2018	Galway United	136	(13)
Total		181	(28)
- * Club domestic league appearances and goals

Gary Shanahan (born 15 February 1993) is an Irish former professional footballer who played as a winger.

Shanahan played youth football with Newcastle West before starting his professional career with Dundalk. Following a season at Mervue United, he joined Galway United where he would spend five seasons as a key player for the club.

== Career ==
=== Dundalk ===
In January 2012, Shanahan joined League of Ireland Premier Division club Dundalk at the age of just 18, with Dundalk manager Sean McCaffrey describing Shanahan as a player with “huge potential”.

On 10 April 2012, Shanahan scored a brace against Longford Town in the League of Ireland Cup.

On 3 August 2012, Shanahan scored a late equalising goal for Dundalk, against Cork City, which would prove crucial as Dundalk only survived in the Premier Division that season via the play-offs.

=== Mervue United ===
In February 2013, Shanahan signed for League of Ireland First Division side Mervue United.

On 30 August 2013, Shanahan would score the winner in the final game between Mervue United and Salthill Devon in the League of Ireland, until the two teams joined the FAI National League in 2026.

On the last day of the season, Shanahan scored a brace in a 4–1 win over Waterford United which meant Mervue overtook Waterford in the league and qualified for the play-offs. In the play-offs Mervue played Longford Town. After a first leg where Mervue won 1–0, Longford won the second leg 2–3 and defeated Mervue on penalties.

Shanahan finished the season as Mervue's top goalscorer and the 5th highest scorer in the First Division, with 10 goals in 23 games.

=== Galway United ===
==== 2014 season ====
On 18 December 2013, Shanahan joined newly formed, Galway FC ahead of the 2014 season.

At the end of the season Galway made it to the play-offs, where in the first play-off they would play Shelbourne, where Shanahan would score in the first-leg at Eamonn Deacy Park as Galway would win 2–0 on the night, and would go on to win the tie 4–1. In the play-off final, Galway would face UCD, where Galway would win 5–1 on aggregate with Shanahan scoring in the second-leg to win promotion back to the Premier Division.

==== 2015 season ====
In the 2015 season, Shanahan played a key role as the once again renamed Galway United survived in the league, avoiding the relegation zone by just two points. Shanahan scored the goal that all but ensured their survival in a 1–1 draw against Bray Wanderers.

In the same season Galway made it to the 2015 League of Ireland Cup final against St Patrick's Athletic, after defeating Shanahan's former club, Dundalk on penalties in the semi-final. Galway were at home in the final in which Shanahan played the entire 120 minutes as the game ended 0–0 after extra-time. It was another game that had gone to penalties, however it would not turn out as fortunate as they would lose the shoutout 3–4.

==== 2016 season ====
On 15 April 2016, Shanahan scored to earn Galway a draw against Cork City who would go on to finish second in the league that season. Once again Shanahan played a large role, playing in every single game in the 2016 season as Galway would once again avoid relegation.

==== 2017 season ====
On 28 April 2017, Shanahan scored a 93rd-minute winner against his former club Dundalk, to give Galway a shock victory against the team that had won the three previous Premier Division titles. Later in the season Dundalk would be the ones to relegate Galway, with Galway losing 3–4 at Eamonn Deacy Park to confirm their relegation.

In the 2017 season, Galway finished 10th out of 12 teams which would normally mean they had avoided relegation once again. However, in that season there was a change in format which meant the bottom three teams were relegated.

==== 2018 season ====
Shanahan re-signed for Galway ahead of their first season back in the First Division.

Despite a good start to the season, manager Shane Keegan was sacked and replaced by Shanahan's teammate Alan Murphy who became player-manager.

Galway United finished the season in 6th failing to qualify for the play-offs, with Shanahan failing to score a single goal in what would turn out to be his final season with the club.

== Career statistics ==
=== Club ===
Appearances and goals by club, season and competition
Club	Season	League			National cup (Note: Includes FAI Cup)		League cup (Note: Includes League of Ireland Cup)		Other		Total	
Club	Season	Division	Apps	Goals	Apps	Goals	Apps	Goals	Apps	Goals	Apps	Goals
Dundalk	2012	LOI Premier Division	22	5	3	1	1	2	1 (Note: Appearance in 2012 Promotion/relegation play-offs)	0	27	8
Mervue United	2013	LOI First Division	23	10	1	0	0	0	2 (Note: Appearances in 2013 Promotion/relegation play-offs)	0	26	10
Galway United	2014	LOI First Division	22	3	2	0	2	1	4 (Note: Appearances in 2014 Promotion/relegation play-offs)	2	30	6
Galway United	2015	LOI Premier Division	33	4	2	0	5	2	—		40	6
Galway United	2016	LOI Premier Division	33	4	1	0	2	0	—		36	4
Galway United	2017	LOI Premier Division	25	2	2	0	3	0	—		30	2
Galway United	2018	LOI First Division	23	0	0	0	1	0	—		24	0
Galway United	Total		136	13	7	0	13	3	4	2	160	18
Career total			181	28	11	1	14	5	7	2	213	36

== Honours ==
Galway United

- League of Ireland Cup; runner up: 2015
