= Paul Sinnott =

Irish footballer and coach (born 1986)

Personal information
- Date of birth: 24 July 1986 (age 40)
- Place of birth: Renmore, Galway, Ireland
- Height: 1.83 m (6 ft 0 in)
- Positions: Central midfielder; centre-back

Youth career
- Renmore
- Mervue United
- 2007–2008: Galway United

Senior career*
Years	Team	Apps	(Gls)
2008–2011	Galway United	79	(1)
2012–2013	Mervue United	22	(2)
2014–2017	Galway United	96	(3)
Total		197	(6)

Managerial career
- 2026–: Mervue United (Assistant Manager)
- * Club domestic league appearances and goals

Paul Sinnott (born 24 July 1986) is an Irish football coach and former professional footballer who is the current assistant manager of FAI National League club Mervue United. He played as a central midfielder and centre-back during his playing career.

He played youth football with Renmore AFC and Mervue United before starting his professional career with Galway United. He went on to captain Galway United, also spending time with Mervue United.

In 2026 he was appointed as assistant manager to Brendan O'Connor at Mervue United alongside Ollie Neary, for the club's first season back in the League of Ireland.

== Playing career ==
=== Galway United ===
In 2007 Sinnott joined the U21s of League of Ireland Premier Division side Galway United. On 25 April 2008, he made his debut in a 3–2 home defeat against Bray Wanderers.

In 2010 Sinnott played in the promotion/relegation play-off, as Galway defeated Bray Wanderers 1–0 surviving relegation. However, in the 2011 season Galway finished bottom of the league on a record-low six points, and lost that year's promotion/relegation play-off to Monaghan United.

=== Mervue United ===
After the 2011 season Galway United no longer competed in the League of Ireland. Following this Sinnott joined League of Ireland First Division side Mervue United and began playing for them in the Galway & District League.

In the 2013 season Sinnott began playing in the First Division with Mervue. At the end of the season Mervue participated in the promotion/relegation play-off where they faced Longford Town. In the 2nd leg, Sinnott scored a 122nd-minute equaliser in extra-time to take the game to penalties, Mervue went on to lose the shoot-out.

=== Return to Galway United ===
Ahead of the 2014 season Galway United re-formed as Galway F.C. and Sinnott re-joined the club and be named club captain ahead of their first season back in the League of Ireland First Division. He played a large role as Galway finisheed third and won the promotion/relegation play-offs defeating Shelbourne and UCD, to gain promotion back to the Premier Division.

During the 2015 season Sinnott captained the renamed Galway United to survival in the Premier Division as well as captaining the club to the 2015 League of Ireland Cup final where Galway lost at home on penalties to St Patrick's Athletic.

Sinnott re-signed for the 2016 season with the captaincy being given to his teammate Ryan Connolly. He once again played a key role as Galway survived relegation. He re-signed again for the 2017 season. During the season Sinnott made his 200th appearance for the club. At the end of the season Galway United were relegated after finishing third last in the league thanks to the reformatting of the Premier Division. This was Sinnott's last season with the club.

== Managerial career ==
Sinnott went on to work as a coach for his local club, Renmore AFC, the Galway United U19s and the Galway United women's team.

=== Mervue United ===
On 17 June 2026, Sinnott was announced as assistant manager of Mervue United alongside Ollie Neary, with Brendan O'Connor being announced as manager for the club's first season in the newly formed FAI National League.

== Style of play ==
Sinnott was left footed and played as either a central midfielder or a centre-back.

== Career statistics ==
Appearances and goals by club, season and competition
Club	Season	League			FAI Cup		League Cup		Other		Total	
Club	Season	Division	Apps	Goals	Apps	Goals	Apps	Goals	Apps	Goals	Apps	Goals
Galway United	2008	LOI Premier Division	1	0	1	0	0	0	—		2	0
Galway United	2009	LOI Premier Division	14	0	0	0	1	0	—		15	0
Galway United	2010	LOI Premier Division	29	0	4	0	0	0	1 (Note: Appearance(s) in promotion/relegation play-offs)	0	34	0
Galway United	2011	LOI Premier Division	35	1	1	0	1	0	2	0	39	1
Galway United	Total		79	1	6	0	2	0	3	0	90	1
Mervue United	2013	LOI First Division	22	2	1	0	1	0	2	1	26	3
Galway United	2014 (Note: During this season the club was known as Galway FC)	LOI First Division	28	2	2	0	2	0	4	0	36	2
Galway United	2015	LOI Premier Division	28	0	2	0	4	0	—		34	0
Galway United	2016	LOI Premier Division	29	1	0	0	2	0	—		31	1
Galway United	2017	LOI Premier Division	11	0	3	0	4	0	—		18	0
Galway United	Total		96	3	7	0	12	0	4	0	126	3
Career total			197	6	14	0	15	0	9	1	242	7

== Honours ==
Galway United

- League of Ireland Cup; runner up: 2015
