= Stephen Walsh (footballer) =

Irish footballer

Personal information
- Date of birth: 29 August 1990 (age 36)
- Place of birth: Galway, Ireland
- Positions: Striker; left back; centre back

Team information
- Current team: Galway United
- Number: 7

Youth career
- 1996–2010: Galway Hibernians

Senior career*
Years	Team	Apps	(Gls)
2010–2011	Galway United	47	(2)
2012–2013	Mervue United	41	(8)
2014–2016	Galway United	75	(4)
2017	Longford Town	17	(0)
2017	Athlone Town	7	(1)
2018–2019	Galway United	50	(3)
2020	Galway Hibernians		
2021–	Galway United	187	(53)
- * Club domestic league appearances and goals as of 21:05, 2 November 2026 (UTC)

Stephen Walsh (born 29 August 1990) is an Irish professional footballer who plays as a striker for League of Ireland Premier Division club Galway United.

Walsh is the all-time record appearance holder for Galway United, having played over 400 games for the club.

Walsh was born in Galway, County Galway and played youth football with Galway Hibernians before starting his professional career with Galway United. Between his multiple spells at Galway United he spent time playing for Mervue United, Longford Town, Athlone Town and Galway Hibernians.

== Career ==
=== Galway United ===
A native of Galway, Walsh played for his local amateur side Galway Hibernians before joining Galway United ahead of the 2010 League of Ireland Premier Division season. In his first season with the club, Galway finished in 8th place, forcing the club to play-off to stay in the division. Walsh played in the relegation play-off match as Galway United beat Bray Wanderers to confirm their spot in the following season's Premier Division.

However, during Walsh's second season at the club, Galway United finished bottom of the league and subsequently withdrew from the League of Ireland due to administrative and financial uncertainties.

=== Mervue United ===
Following the effective dissolution of Galway United, Walsh joined fellow Galway-based side Mervue United who were competing in the League of Ireland First Division at the time. On 32 August 2012, Walsh captained the team against Finn Harps.

After playing twenty league games for Mervue, scoring once, Walsh re-signed for the club for the 2013 First Division season. He played another twenty-one games for the club, this time scoring seven goals.

On 25 October 2013 Mervue faced Longford Town in the Promotion/relegation play-off. The game ended 3–3 after extra-time and during the penalty shoot-out Walsh took a penalty which he missed, as Mervue lost 0–3 on penalties.

=== Second spell at Galway United ===
After spending two seasons with Mervue, ahead of the 2014 League of Ireland First Division season Mervue United and Salthill Devon both withdrew from the League of Ireland to make way for the returning Galway United, Walsh subsequently rejoined the returning team.

In his first season back at the club Walsh helped Galway get promoted via the play-offs taking them back to the Premier Division

Walsh would spend the next two seasons helping his team (who was renamed back to Galway United) survive in the Premier Division.

=== Longford Town ===
In 2017 Walsh joined recently relegated, First Division side Longford Town.

=== Athlone Town ===
Midway through the 2017 season Walsh left Longford and joined fellow First Division side Athlone Town whom he briefly captained near the end of the season.

=== Third spell at Galway United ===
Ahead of the 2018 season Walsh joined Galway United for a third time after they had been relegated from the Premier Division the previous season.

He spent two seasons at Galway United during his third stint at the club the latter of which he spent captaining the side.

=== Galway Hibernians ===
Walsh spent the 2020 season playing for Galway Hibernians in the Galway & District League.

=== Return to Galway United ===
Walsh joined Galway United for a fourth time ahead of the 2021 season.

Walsh helped Galway to two seasons ended inside the play-off spots in a row, the latter of which saw Walsh as the team's top goal scorer, however neither resulted in promotion.

However Galway were finally promoted in the 2023 season, winning the league by a massive 25 points with Walsh being the clubs second highest goal scorer that season.

In their first season back in the Premier Division in seven years Walsh was once again United's top goal scorer helping them to a 5th-place finish, which was the teams highest finish since 1994.

On 26 September 2025, Walsh made his 368th appearance for Galway United, joining Kevin Cassidy as the club's record holder for all-time appearances. He scored a brace in the same game to help Galway win 2–1 over Cork City.

On 15 November 2025 there was a Stephen Walsh Testimonial at Eamonn Deacy Park which saw a Galway United Legends XI take on a Galway FA Legends XI.

On 17 April 2026, Walsh scored a bicycle kick against Dundalk at Oriel Park which won the League of Ireland goal of the month. On 21 August 2026, Walsh played his 400th game for Galway United in a 2–1 win away against Dundalk.

== Style of play ==
Walsh spent the majority of his career playing as either a left back or a centre back. However, later in his career, particularly from the 2022 season onwards, Walsh was primarily deployed as a striker.

== Career statistics ==
As of match played 30 October 2026

Appearances and goals by club, season and competition
Club	Season	League			FAI Cup		League Cup		Play-offs		Total	
Club	Season	Division	Apps	Goals	Apps	Goals	Apps	Goals	Apps	Goals	Apps	Goals
Galway United	2010	LOI Premier Division	15	2	3	0	0	0	1	0	19	2
Galway United	2011	LOI Premier Division	32	0	1	0	1	0	2	0	36	0
Galway United	Total		47	2	4	0	1	0	3	0	55	2
Mervue United	2012	LOI First Division	20	1	3	0	1	0	—		24	1
Mervue United	2013	LOI First Division	21	7	1	0	1	0	2	0	25	7
Mervue United	Total		41	8	4	0	2	0	2	0	49	8
Galway United	2014	LOI First Division	23	4	2	1	2	0	4	0	31	5
Galway United	2015	LOI Premier Division	28	0	1	0	5	0	—		34	0
Galway United	2016	LOI Premier Division	24	0	0	0	1	0	—		25	0
Galway United	Total		75	4	3	1	8	0	4	0	90	5
Longford Town	2017	LOI First Division	17	0	0	0	3	0	—		20	0
Athlone Town	2017	LOI First Division	7	1	2	0	0	0	—		9	1
Galway United	2018	LOI First Division	26	1	2	0	2	0	—		30	1
Galway United	2019	LOI First Division	24	2	3	0	2	0	—		29	1
Galway United	Total		50	3	5	0	4	0	—		59	2
Galway Hibernians	2019–20	Galway & District League			—		—					
Galway Hibernians	2020–21	Galway & District League			—		—					
Galway Hibernians	Total				—		—					
Galway United	2021	LOI First Division	19	1	1	0	—		2	0	22	1
Galway United	2022	LOI First Division	29	16	2	2	—		3	0	34	18
Galway United	2023	LOI First Division	35	15	4	3	—		—		39	18
Galway United	2024	LOI Premier Division	33	9	1	0	—		—		34	9
Galway United	2025	LOI Premier Division	36	5	3	2	—		—		39	7
Galway United	2026	LOI Premier Division	35	7	4	2	—		—		39	9
Galway United	Total		187	53	15	9	—		5	0	207	62
Career total			424	71	33	10	18	0	14	0	489	81

== Honours ==
Galway United

- League of Ireland First Division: 2023
- League of Ireland Cup; runner up: 2015
