= Ryan Manning =

Irish footballer (born 1996)

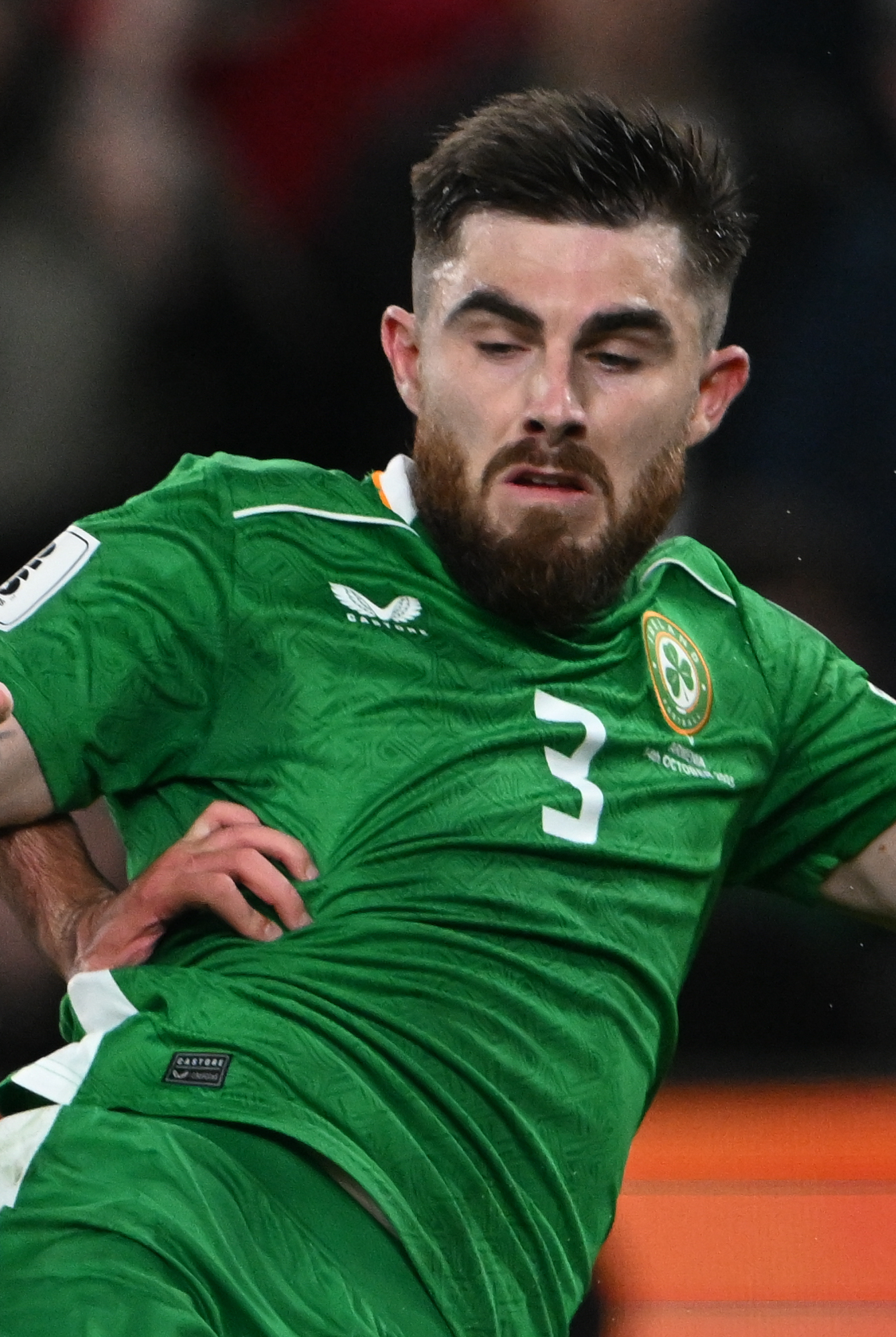
- Manning with the Republic of Ireland in 2025

Personal information
- Full name: Ryan Phelim Manning
- Date of birth: 14 June 1996 (age 30)
- Place of birth: Galway, Ireland
- Height: 1.73 m (5 ft 8 in)
- Positions: Left-back; midfielder

Team information
- Current team: Southampton
- Number: 3

Youth career
- Cregmore/Claregalway F.C.
- Mervue United

Senior career*
Years	Team	Apps	(Gls)
2013	Mervue United	26	(9)
2014	Galway United	21	(4)
2015–2020	Queens Park Rangers	87	(7)
2018–2019	→ Rotherham United (loan)	18	(4)
2020–2023	Swansea City	98	(7)
2023–	Southampton	120	(9)

International career^{‡}
2012–2013	Republic of Ireland U17		
2014–2015	Republic of Ireland U19	10	(5)
2017–2018	Republic of Ireland U21	8	(2)
2020–	Republic of Ireland	29	(0)
- * Club domestic league appearances and goals as of 15:28, 21 November 2026 (UTC) ‡ National team caps and goals as of 23:21, 17 November 2026 (UTC)

Ryan Phelim Manning (born 14 June 1996) is an Irish professional footballer who plays as a left-back or midfielder for EFL Championship club Southampton and the Republic of Ireland national team.

Manning began his career with Mervue United and Galway United in Ireland before joining Queens Park Rangers in 2015. He spent the first part of the 2018–19 season on loan at Rotherham United before being recalled in January 2019. Manning moved to Swansea City in 2020. After leaving Swansea in 2023, he signed for Southampton. Manning has represented his country at youth and full international level.

== Early life ==
Born on 14 June 1996, Manning grew up in Carnmore, County Galway and played with his local football team, Cregmore Claregalway.

== Club career ==
=== Mervue United ===
Manning started his senior career at Mervue United, playing for the club's under-19 side before progressing to the club's first team. He made his debut as a 16-year-old against Athlone Town in the second tier of Irish football, the League of Ireland First Division. He went on to make 29 senior appearances in 2013, scoring 9 goals in his first season. In his sole season with the club, Mervue reached the League of Ireland promotion/relegation play-offs. Manning was sent off in the second leg of the semi-final against Longford Town and Mervue went on to lose the match on penalties after an aggregate scoreline of 3–3.

When Mervue United withdrew from the national league, after the O'Connor report recommended that one club represent the city of Galway, Manning signed for Galway F.C. (later renamed Galway United).

=== Galway United ===
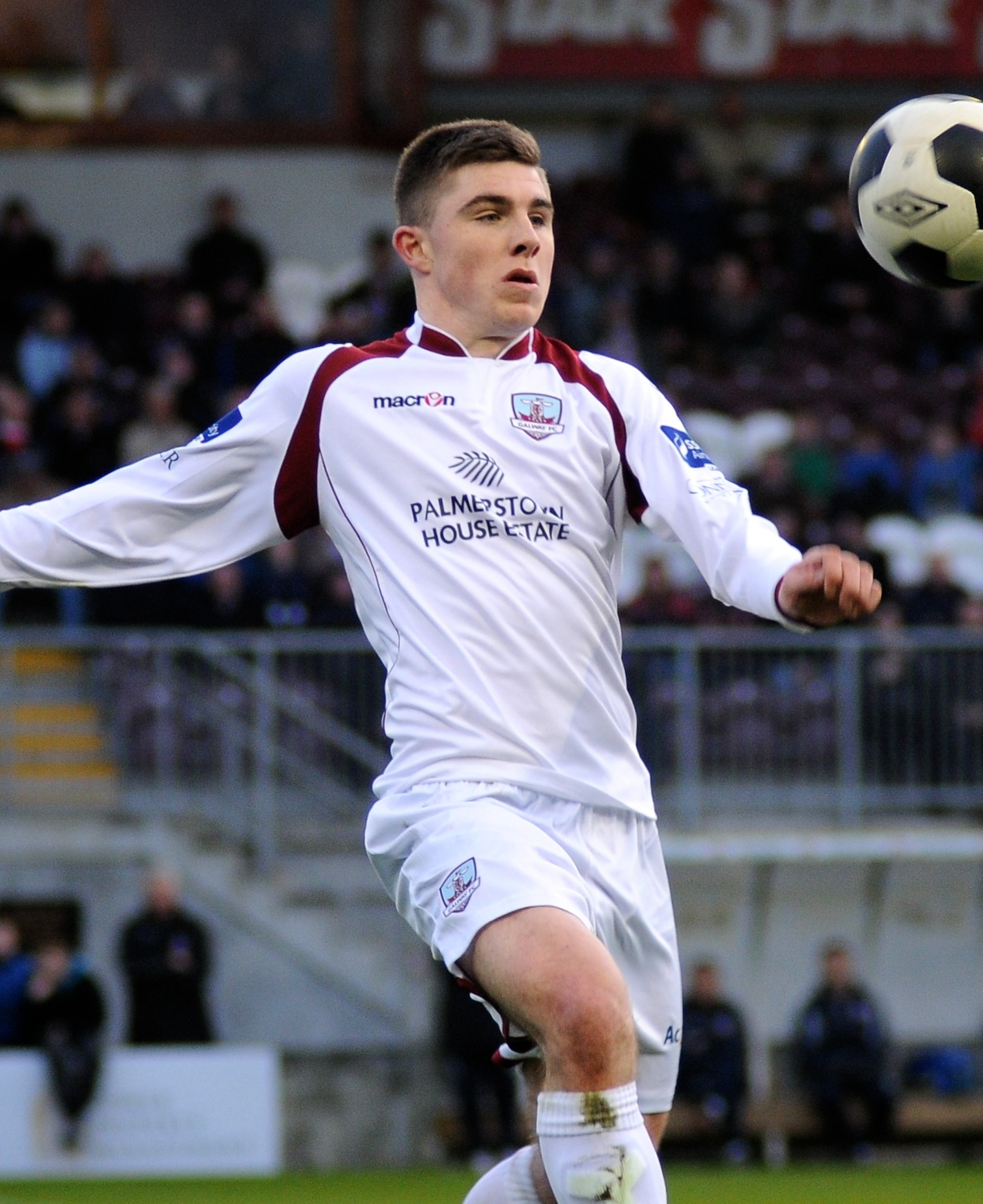
Manning playing for Galway United in 2014

After his debut season at Mervue he moved to fellow First Division side Galway United for the 2014 season. Manning and Galway had a brilliant season as they went on to win promotion to the Premier Division via the Promotion/relegation play-offs, with Manning scoring in both legs of the final as United brushed aside Premier Division outfit University College Dublin in a 5–1 aggregate win.

=== Queens Park Rangers ===
In January 2015, Manning was signed by Queens Park Rangers on a two-and-a-half-year contract. The then manager Harry Redknapp stated he was delighted that Manning had signed for Rangers after having received interest from other Premier League clubs.

After Redknapp departed QPR, Manning initially did not feature in the first team under managers Chris Ramsey or Jimmy Floyd Hasselbaink. But, with the arrival of Ian Holloway, he was given his first team debut on 31 December 2016 against Wolves a game that Rangers went on to win after having had a run of six consecutive losses. He performed so well that he was hailed by his manager as having been "outstanding". Manning described his own debut as a dream come true, especially as he only received his squad number the day before. He impressed in his next two games, which were all victories, and he was thus awarded a new contract tying him to the club until 2019. He rounded off the month by scoring his first league goal against Fulham on 21 January, in a game which ended in a 1–1 draw against their west London rivals.

==== Rotherham United (loan) ====
On 16 August 2018, Manning joined Rotherham United on a loan deal until the end of the 2018–19 season. Manning was recalled by QPR in January 2019. He made 18 appearances and scored four goals for Rotherham during his time on loan at the New York Stadium.

=== Swansea City ===
On 16 October 2020, Manning joined fellow Championship side Swansea City for an undisclosed fee, signing a three-year contract. He made his debut for the club on 27 October, starting in a 2–0 victory over Stoke City, a victory that saw Swansea move into the automatic promotion places.

In February 2023, Swansea manager Russell Martin confirmed that Manning would depart the club at the end of the season with the defender having no intentions of signing a new contract.

=== Southampton ===
Manning playing for Southampton in 2025

On 11 July 2023, Manning joined Southampton on a free transfer, signing a four-year contract. Manning made his professional debut for the club on 4 August 2023 in a 2–1 away victory against Sheffield Wednesday. Following his fifth yellow card of the campaign during a 2–1 away victory against Hull City, he was suspended for one game.

He made his first Premier League appearance on 5 October 2024 in a 3–1 defeat against Arsenal. Southampton were ultimately relegated from the Premier League, but Manning outlined his desire to stay at the club. He made 27 appearances in all competitions throughout the season.

On 10 August 2025, Manning came on as a substitute, where he scored a free-kick and provided Jack Stephens with an assist to help secure a 2–1 victory against Wrexham. Manning scored another free-kick on 30 August in a 2–2 draw with Watford.

== International career ==
On 6 November 2018, Manning was named in the senior Republic of Ireland squad for the first time for the friendly against Northern Ireland on 15 November and the UEFA Nations League match against Denmark on 19 November 2018. He made his senior international debut against Bulgaria in the UEFA Nations League on 18 November 2020.

== Personal life ==
His brother Ronan Manning is also a professional footballer for League of Ireland First Division club Treaty United.

== Career statistics ==
=== Club ===
As of match played 21 November 2026

Appearances and goals by club, season and competition
Club	Season	League			National cup (Note: Includes FAI Cup, FA Cup)		League cup (Note: Includes League of Ireland Cup, EFL Cup)		Other		Total	
Club	Season	Division	Apps	Goals	Apps	Goals	Apps	Goals	Apps	Goals	Apps	Goals
Mervue United	2013	LOI First Division	26	9	1	0	1	0	2 (Note: Appearances in League of Ireland promotion/relegation playoffs)	0	30	9
Galway United	2014	LOI First Division	21	4	0	0	1	0	4	2	26	6
Queens Park Rangers	2014–15	Premier League	0	0	0	0	0	0	—		0	0
Queens Park Rangers	2015–16	Championship	0	0	0	0	0	0	—		0	0
Queens Park Rangers	2016–17	Championship	18	1	0	0	0	0	—		18	1
Queens Park Rangers	2017–18	Championship	19	2	0	0	2	0	—		21	2
Queens Park Rangers	2018–19	Championship	9	0	2	0	1	0	—		12	0
Queens Park Rangers	2019–20	Championship	41	4	1	0	2	1	—		44	5
Queens Park Rangers	2020–21	Championship	0	0	0	0	1	1	—		1	1
Queens Park Rangers	Total		87	7	3	0	6	2	—		96	9
Rotherham United (loan)	2018–19	Championship	18	4	—		—		—		18	4
Swansea City	2020–21	Championship	17	0	3	0	—		1 (Note: Appearance(s) in Championship play-offs)	0	21	0
Swansea City	2021–22	Championship	38	2	1	0	3	0	—		42	2
Swansea City	2022–23	Championship	43	5	2	0	1	0	—		46	5
Swansea City	Total		98	7	6	0	4	0	1	0	109	7
Southampton	2023–24	Championship	37	0	1	0	0	0	3	0	41	0
Southampton	2024–25	Premier League	24	0	2	0	1	0	—		27	0
Southampton	2025–26	Championship	43	8	3	0	3	0	2	0	51	8
Southampton	2026–27	Championship	16	1	0	0	1	0	—		17	1
Southampton	Total		120	9	6	0	5	0	5	0	136	9
Career total			370	40	16	0	17	2	12	2	415	44

=== International ===
As of match played 17 November 2026

Appearances and goals by national team and year
National team	Year	Apps	Goals
Republic of Ireland	2020	1	0
Republic of Ireland	2021	3	0
Republic of Ireland	2022	2	0
Republic of Ireland	2023	5	0
Republic of Ireland	2024	2	0
Republic of Ireland	2025	9	0
Republic of Ireland	2026	7	0
Total		29	0

== Honours ==
Southampton

- EFL Championship play-offs: 2024

Individual

- Swansea City Player of the Year: 2022–23
