= Alan Murphy (footballer, born 1981) =

Irish footballer (born 1981)

Personal information
- Date of birth: 3 October 1981 (age 45)
- Place of birth: Ballinrobe, Mayo, Ireland
- Height: 1.75 m (5 ft 9 in)
- Positions: Central midfielder; striker

Youth career
- 1997–1999: Galway United

Senior career*
Years	Team	Apps	(Gls)
1999–2004	Galway United	116	(48)
2004–2005	Derry City	58	(11)
2006–2007	Galway United	64	(12)
2008	Shamrock Rovers	14	(2)
2008–2011	Galway United	69	(10)
2012–2013	Mervue United	15	(7)
2014	Galway	0	(0)
2018–2019	Galway United	19	(2)
Total		385	(92)

Managerial career
- 2011: Galway United A
- 2018–2020: Galway United
- 2022: Galway WFC
- * Club domestic league appearances and goals

Alan Murphy (born 3 October 1981) is an Irish football coach and former player, who is a technical coach for League of Ireland Premier Division club St Patrick's Athletic.

Murphy is most well known for his many stints for Galway United, where he is the club's second highest all time leading goalscorer, behind Paul McGee, and is the club’s all time leading goalscorer in the league. He has also spent time playing for Derry City, Shamrock Rovers and Mervue United.

As a manager, Murphy spent two years as manager of Galway United and one year as manager Galway WFC.

== Playing career ==
=== Galway United ===
On 16 April 2000, Murphy made his debut for Galway United in the connacht derby against Sligo Rovers in The Showgrounds, in a game that ended 1–1 and saw Sligo get relegated. In the 2001–02 season Murphy was Galway’s top goalscorer scoring 11 goals as the club were relegated.

In the 2002–03 season Murphy scored 12 goals in a league season with only 22 games, as Galway reached the play-offs. However in the play-off final against Drogheda United after winning the first leg 2–0, Galway would lose the second leg 0–3 after extra-time.

In the 2003 season, Murphy topped the scoring charts in the League of Ireland First Division, scoring 21 goals in the league that season.

=== Derry City ===
Murphy’s great form over the previous three seasons earned him a move to League of Ireland Premier Division club Derry City ahead of the 2004 season, for a fee of €22,000.

Murphy scored the opener in the 2005 League of Ireland Cup final as Derry defeated UCD 2–1 at Belfield Park to win the cup.

=== Return to Galway United ===
Murphy returned to League of Ireland First Division club Galway United ahead of the 2006 season. In his first season back with Galway, he helped the club get promoted back to the Premier Division.

=== Shamrock Rovers ===
In February 2008, Murphy signed for League of Ireland Premier Division side Shamrock Rovers.

=== Third stint with Galway United ===
In the summer of 2008, Murphy once again joined Galway United, after only six months away. Murphy played in every remaining league game in the 2008 season and played a large role as Galway survived relegation by one point.

Murphy missed the entire 2010 season with a knee injury, in a season where Galway only survived relegation via the play-offs.

Murphy would return for the 2011 season, however that season Galway would go on to have the worst season in the club’s history, finishing with only 6 points from 36 games. Following the end of the season Galway United withdrew completely from the League of Ireland.

=== Mervue United ===
Following the demise of Galway United, Murphy would join fellow Galway side, League of Ireland First Division club Mervue United ahead of the 2012 season. Murphy missed the entirety of the 2013 season with an injury.

=== Galway FC ===
Ahead of the 2014 season, Murphy once again re-signed with Galway United, who had just been re-named Galway FC. During the season he worked as a coach as he once again couldn’t play because of an injury.

=== West United ===
During his time away from professional football, Murphy played with Galway & District League side West United.

=== Fifth spell with Galway United ===
On 31 January 2018, Murphy once again signed for recently relegated, League of Ireland First Division side Galway United. On 27 April 2018, Murphy broke the record of goals scored for Galway United in the League of Ireland in a 3–0 win over Cobh Ramblers.

== Managerial career ==
In January 2017, Murphy was appointed Manager of Galway United's U17 side.

=== Galway United ===
On 3 July 2018, Murphy was appointed as Galway United manager for the remainder of the 2018 season, following the sacking of Shane Keegan.

At the end of the season Galway finished in 6th, which was higher than they were when Murphy took over, because of this Murphy was rewarded with a contract extension that would see him manage the club through the 2019 season.

During the 2020 season season after a run of 8 winless games, Murphy was sacked by Galway United. He would go on to be replaced by former Premier Division winning manager, John Caulfield.

=== Galway WFC ===
Alan Murphy was appointed manager of Women’s National League club Galway WFC ahead of the 2022 season. Murphy guided the club to a 6th place finish, in what would turn out to be the club’s last season before withdrawing from the league and being replaced by Galway United WFC.

=== Galway United technical coach ===
Murphy joined the backroom staff with Galway United as a technical coach ahead of the 2025 season.

== Career statistics ==
=== Club ===
Appearances and goals by club, season and competition
Club	Season	League			National cup (Note: Includes FAI Cup)		League cup (Note: Includes League of Ireland Cup)		Other		Total	
Club	Season	Division	Apps	Goals	Apps	Goals	Apps	Goals	Apps	Goals	Apps	Goals
Galway United	1999–2000	LOI Premier Division	1	0	0	0	0	0	—		1	0
Galway United	2000–01	LOI Premier Division	29	4	0	0	0	0	—		29	4
Galway United	2001–02	LOI Premier Division	31	11	1	0	0	0	—		32	11
Galway United	2002–03	LOI First Division	22	12	2	0	—		4 (Note: Appearances in the Promotion/relegation play-offs)	1	28	13
Galway United	2003	LOI First Division	33	21	3	3	0	0	—		36	24
Galway United	Total		116	48	6	3	0	0	4	1	126	52
Derry City	2004	LOI Premier Division	32	6	5	0	1	0	—		38	6
Derry City	2005	LOI Premier Division	26	5	4	0	3	2	—		41	7
Derry City	Total		58	11	9	0	4	2	0	0	71	13
Galway United	2006	LOI First Division	33	9	1	1	1	0	—		35	10
Galway United	2007	LOI Premier Division	31	3	0	0	1	1	—		32	4
Galway United	Total		64	12	1	1	2	1	0	0	67	14
Shamrock Rovers	2008	LOI Premier Division	14	2	1	0	2	0	—		7	0
Galway United	2008	LOI Premier Division	16	3	0	0	0	0	—		16	3
Galway United	2009	LOI Premier Division	24	2	1	0	1	0	—		26	2
Galway United	2010	LOI Premier Division	0	0	0	0	0	0	0	0	0	0
Galway United	2011	LOI Premier Division	29	5	1	1	1	0	2 (Note: Appearances in the Promotion/relegation play-offs)	1	33	7
Galway United	Total		69	10	2	1	2	0	2	1	76	12
Mervue United	2012	LOI First Division	15	7	1	0	0	0	—		16	7
Mervue United	2013	LOI First Division	0	0	0	0	0	0	0	0	0	0
Mervue United	Total		15	7	1	0	0	0	0	0	16	7
Galway (Note: During this season Galway United were named, Galway FC)	2014	LOI First Division	0	0	0	0	0	0	0	0	0	0
Galway United	2018	LOI First Division	16	2	1	0	2	0	—		19	2
Galway United	2019	LOI First Division	3	0	0	0	0	0	—		3	0
Galway United	Total		19	2	1	0	2	0	0	0	22	2
Career total			385	92	21	5	12	3	6	2	424	102

=== Managerial career ===
Managerial record by team and tenure
Team	From	To	Record							
Team	From	To	G	W	D	L	GF	GA	GD	Win %
(Republic of Ireland) Galway United	6 August 2018	17 August 2020	51	15	11	25	67	77	−10	29.41
(Republic of Ireland) Galway WFC	5 March 2022	29 October 2022	28	11	6	11	48	39	+9	39.29
Total			79	26	17	36	115	116	−1	32.91

== Honours ==
Derry City

- League of Ireland Cup: 2005
