= 2014 League of Ireland First Division =

League of Ireland First Division
- Season: 2014
- Champions: Longford Town
- Promoted: Galway
- Matches: 112
- Goals: 294 (2.63 per match)
- Top goalscorer: David O'Sullivan: 19 (Longford Town)

The 2014 League of Ireland First Division season was the 30th season of the League of Ireland First Division. The First Division was contested by eight teams and Longford Town won the title. Galway were also promoted.

== Teams ==
Locations of the First Division teams

=== Stadia and locations ===
| Team | Location | Stadium |
|---|---|---|
| Cobh Ramblers | Cobh | St. Colman's Park |
| Finn Harps | Ballybofey | Finn Park |
| Galway | Galway | Eamonn Deacy Park |
| Longford Town | Longford | City Calling Stadium |
| Shamrock Rovers B | Tallaght | Tallaght Stadium |
| Shelbourne | Drumcondra | Tolka Park |
| Waterford United | Waterford | Waterford RSC |
| Wexford Youths | Crossabeg | Ferrycarrig Park |

=== Personnel and kits ===
Note: Flags indicate national team as has been defined under FIFA eligibility rules. Players may hold more than one non-FIFA nationality.

| Team | Manager | Kit manufacturer | Shirt sponsor |
|---|---|---|---|
| Cobh Ramblers | (Republic of Ireland) Martin Cambridge | Nike | Eirgrid |
| Finn Harps | (Republic of Ireland) Ollie Horgan | Macron | McGettigan Group |
| Galway | (Republic of Ireland) Tommy Dunne | Macron | Comer Property Management |
| Longford Town | (Republic of Ireland) Tony Cousins | Macron | City Calling |
| Shamrock Rovers B | (Republic of Ireland) Colin Hawkins | Warrior | Pepper |
| Shelbourne | (Republic of Ireland) Johnny McDonnell | Macron | Volkswagen |
| Waterford United | (Republic of Ireland) Tommy Griffin | Macron | SportsWorld / DVF Print |
| Wexford Youths | (Republic of Ireland) Shane Keegan | O'Neills | Galenisy's |

== Overview ==
The 2014 First Division featured eight teams. Aside from Shelbourne, who were relegated from the Premier Division, replacing the 2013 First Division champions, Athlone Town, there were two other team changes from the previous season. In 2012 an FAI commissioned report recommended that Galway city and County Galway should be represented in the League of Ireland by a single club or team based at Eamonn Deacy Park. The O'Connor Report also recommended that the Galway United Supporters Trust, Salthill Devon, Mervue United and the Galway Football Association, should work together to form such a club. Following the conclusion of the 2013 First Division season, both Mervue United and Salthill Devon withdrew from the League of Ireland to make way for a new team known as Galway F.C. This still left another vacancy and in December 2013 Shamrock Rovers F.C. received permission from the FAI to enter their reserve team in the First Division for the 2014 season.

Each team played each other four times, twice at home and twice away, for a total of 28 matches during the season. Longford Town clinched the title following a resounding 5–0 victory at home to Shamrock Rovers B on 3 October 2014. Longford Town ended a seven-season stint in the First Division as they were promoted to the 2015 Premier Division. Galway also secured promotion after defeating UCD in a play off. Shamrock Rovers B withdrew from the First Division after just one season. Rovers decided it was not financially viable to continue fielding two teams in the League of Ireland.

== Final table ==
| Pos | Team | Pld | W | D | L | GF | GA | GD | Pts | Qualification |
|---|---|---|---|---|---|---|---|---|---|---|
| 1 | Longford Town (C, P) | 28 | 18 | 6 | 4 | 56 | 19 | +37 | 60 | Promotion to League of Ireland Premier Division |
| 2 | Shelbourne | 28 | 14 | 10 | 4 | 46 | 30 | +16 | 52 | Qualification for Promotion play-offs |
| 3 | Galway (O, P) | 28 | 13 | 10 | 5 | 47 | 23 | +24 | 49 | Qualification for Promotion play-offs |
| 4 | Wexford Youths | 28 | 13 | 7 | 8 | 45 | 35 | +10 | 46 | |
| 5 | Finn Harps | 28 | 7 | 11 | 10 | 26 | 28 | −2 | 32 | |
| 6 | Shamrock Rovers B | 28 | 7 | 5 | 16 | 25 | 50 | −25 | 26 | Withdrew from league |
| 7 | Waterford United | 28 | 6 | 7 | 15 | 25 | 43 | −18 | 25 | |
| 8 | Cobh Ramblers | 28 | 2 | 8 | 18 | 24 | 66 | −42 | 14 | |

Rules for classification: 1) points; 2) goal difference; 3) number of goals scored.
(C) Champions; (O) Play-off winners; (P) Promoted

== Promotion/relegation playoffs ==
The second and third placed First Division teams, Shelbourne and Galway, played off to decide who would play UCD, the eleventh placed team from the Premier Division. The winner of this play off would play in the 2015 Premier Division.

First Division

| 18 October 2014 | Galway | 2 – 0 | Shelbourne | Eamonn Deacy Park |
| 19:45 | Ryan Connolly 19'; Gary Shanahan 84' | Report | Nathan Murphy (yellow card) 19' | Attendance: 1,764; Referee: Ray Matthews |

| 24 October 2014 | Shelbourne | 1 – 2 | Galway | Tolka Park |
| 19:45 | Conor Murphy 34' | Report | Ryan Connolly 59'; Jake Keegan 82' | Attendance: 1,202; Referee: Robert Harvey (Kerry) |

Galway won 4 – 1 on aggregate

First Division v Premier Division

| 28 October 2014 | UCD | 1 – 2 | Galway | UCD Bowl |
| 19:45 | Timmy Molloy 18'; Colm Crowe (yellow card) 27'; Gareth Matthews (yellow card) 39' | Report | Jason Molloy (yellow card) 23'; Paddy Barrett 89'; Ryan Manning 90' | Attendance: 643; Referee: James McKell |

| 1 November 2014 | Galway | 3 – 0 | UCD | Eamonn Deacy Park |
| 20:45 | Alex Byrne (yellow card) 20'; Gary Shanahan 45'; Ryan Manning 71'; Alex Byrne 80' | Report | | Attendance: 2,890; Referee: Dave McKeon |

Galway won 5–1 on aggregate and were promoted to 2015 Premier Division. UCD are relegated to 2015 First Division.

== Awards ==
=== Top scorers ===
| Rank | Player | Club | Goals |
|---|---|---|---|
| 1 | David O'Sullivan | Longford Town | 19 (1 pen.) |
| 2 | Danny Furlong | Wexford Youths | 16 (5 pen.) |
| 3 | Dylan Connolly | Shelbourne | 12 (1 pen.) |
| 4 | Jake Keegan | Galway | 11 |
| 5 | Gary Shaw | Longford Town | 10 |

=== Player of the Year ===
| Winner | Club |
|---|---|
| David O'Sullivan | Longford Town |

=== Team of the Year ===
| No. | Pos. | Player | Date of birth (age) | Caps | Club |
|---|---|---|---|---|---|
| 1 | GK | Graham Doyle | | | Wexford Youths |
| 2 | DF | Colm Horgan | | | Galway |
| 3 | DF | Paddy Barrett | | | Galway |
| 4 | DF | Patrick Sullivan | | | Longford Town |
| 5 | DF | Lee Desmond | | | Shelbourne |
| 6 | MF | Dylan Connolly | | | Shelbourne |
| 7 | MF | Stephen Rice | | | Longford Town |
| 8 | MF | Ryan Connolly | | | Galway |
| 9 | FW | Danny Furlong | | | Wexford Youths |
| 10 | FW | David O'Sullivan | | | Longford Town |
| 11 | FW | Gary Shaw | | | Longford Town |

== See also ==
- 2014 League of Ireland Premier Division
- 2014 League of Ireland Cup
