= Connor Gleeson =

Galway Gaelic footballer

Personal information
- Born: 13 June 1993 (age 33) Galway, Ireland

Sport
- Sport: Gaelic football
- Position: Goalkeeper
Club
- Years: Club
- Dunmore MacHales
Inter-county
- Years: County
- 2020–: Galway
Inter-county titles
- Connacht titles: 3

Connor Gleeson (born 13 June 1993) is a Gaelic footballer who plays for Dunmore MacHales and the Galway county team. His usual position is as a goalkeeper.

He saved a Conor McManus penalty in Pádraic Joyce's first game as manager.

He scored the decisive point in the 2024 Connacht Senior Football Championship final.

== Soccer career ==
Soccer career
Personal information
- Position: Goalkeeper

Youth career
- 2010: Mervue United

Senior career*
Years	Team	Apps	(Gls)
2010–2013	Mervue United	28	(0)
2014–2015	Galway United	29	(0)
2015	Athlone Town	0	(0)
2016	Galway United	0	(0)
2017	Athlone Town	4	(0)
2018	Galway United	4	(0)
2026	Galway United	0	(0)
- * Club domestic league appearances and goals as of 31 July 2026

He played association football as a goalkeeper for Galway United in the League of Ireland from 2014 to 2018 before turning to GAA. On 1 July 2026, he returned to Galway United on a short-term contract to provider goalkeeping cover after their loanee keeper Evan Watts returned to his parent club Swansea City. On 31 July 2026, he departed the club without having made an appearance following their signing of Vincent Angelini.

== Honours ==
Galway

- Connacht Senior Football Championship (4): 2022, 2023, 2024, 2025
