= Derek O'Brien (footballer, born 1979) =

Irish footballer

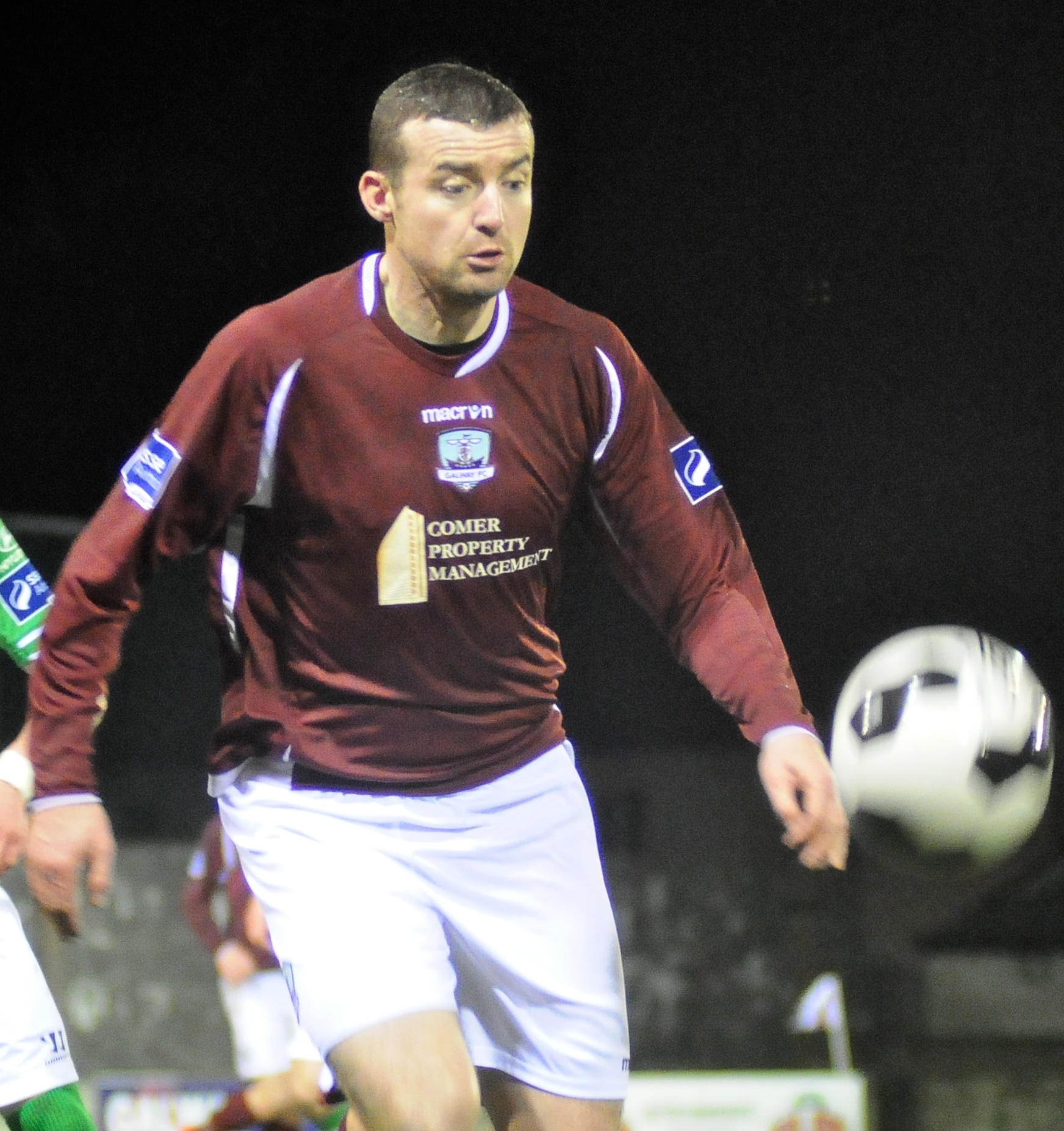
- O'Brien with Galway United in 2014

Personal information
- Date of birth: 14 November 1979 (age 46)
- Place of birth: Tralee, Ireland
- Position: Midfielder

Youth career
- Tralee Dynamos

Senior career*
Years	Team	Apps	(Gls)
2000–2003	Galway United	45	(6)
2003	Sligo Rovers		
2004–2008	Galway United	?	(12)
2008	St Patrick's Athletic	12	(1)
2009–2010	Galway United	55	(6)
2011	Cork City	19	(3)
2012	Limerick	16	(0)
2013	Salthill Devon	13	(1)
2013	Longford Town	12	(0)
2014	Galway United	11	(1)
2014–2015	Tralee Dynamos		
- * Club domestic league appearances and goals

Derek O'Brien (born 14 November 1979) is an Irish former footballer.

== Playing career ==
O'Brien is a left winger with plenty of speed and trickery. He was an integral part of Galway United's first season back in the Premier Division in 2007. So much so that he was elected to the PFAI Premier Division Team of the Year and he was subsequently voted Galway United player of the year for 2007. He also won the Galway United Supporter's Trust (GUST) 2007 player of the year award. O'Brien was subject to interest from Derry City who are believed to have offered him an excellent deal, however he opted to commit himself to the Tribesmen for another season at least. In July 2008 he signed for St Patrick's Athletic from Galway United. He stayed at Pats for the remainder of the season before returning to Galway United in January 2009. He signed for Cork City in February 2011. Following his release from Cork at the end of their 2011 League of Ireland First Division winning season, O'Brien joined Limerick. He was a member of the Limerick squad which won the 2012 First Division title. After leaving the Blues, he joined Salthill Devon before the 2013 season.

O'Brien spent the first half of the 2013 season at Salthill Devon before joining Longford Town in July 2013 for the remainder of the year.

== Honours ==
=== Club ===
Cork City

- League of Ireland First Division (1): 2011

Limerick

- League of Ireland First Division (1): 2012
- Munster Senior Cup (1): 2011-12

=== Individual ===
- PFAI Premier Division Team of the Year - 2007
- PFAI First Division Team of the Year - 2006
