= 2012 League of Ireland First Division =

League of Ireland First Division
- Season: 2012
- Champions: Limerick
- Matches: 112
- Goals: 305 (2.72 per match)
- Top goalscorer: Danny Furlong: 13 (Wexford Youths); Kevin McHugh: 13 (Finn Harps); Sean Maguire: 13 (Waterford United)

The 2012 League of Ireland First Division season was the 28th season of the League of Ireland First Division. The First Division was contested by 8 teams and Limerick won the title.

== Teams ==
Locations of First Division teams

| Team | Location | Manager | Stadium |
|---|---|---|---|
| Athlone Town | Athlone | (Republic of Ireland) Mike Kerley | Athlone Town Stadium |
| Finn Harps | Ballybofey | (Northern Ireland) Peter Hutton | Finn Park |
| Limerick | Limerick | (Republic of Ireland) Pat Scully | Jackman Park |
| Longford Town | Longford | (Republic of Ireland) Tony Cousins | Flancare Park |
| Mervue United | Galway | (Republic of Ireland) Johnny Glynn | Fahy's Field |
| SD Galway | Galway | (Republic of Ireland) Tony Mannion | Terryland Park |
| Waterford United | Waterford | (Republic of Ireland) Paul O'Brien | Waterford RSC |
| Wexford Youths | Wexford | (Republic of Ireland) Shane Keegan | Ferrycarraig Park |

== Overview ==
Due to the expansion of the Premier Division, coupled with the withdrawal of Galway United during the off-season, the 2012 First Division consisted of just eight teams. Applications to join the Division from Cobh Ramblers and Tralee Dynamos, both of whom had played in the 2011 A Championship, were rejected. Each team played every other team four times, totalling twenty eight games.

== Final table ==
| Pos | Team | Pld | W | D | L | GF | GA | GD | Pts | Qualification or relegation |
|---|---|---|---|---|---|---|---|---|---|---|
| 1 | Limerick (C, P) | 28 | 20 | 2 | 6 | 51 | 20 | +31 | 62 | Promoted to Premier Division |
| 2 | Waterford United | 28 | 18 | 4 | 6 | 46 | 29 | +17 | 58 | Lost promotion/relegation play-offs |
| 3 | Longford Town | 28 | 15 | 5 | 8 | 42 | 33 | +9 | 50 | Lost promotion/relegation play-offs |
| 4 | Wexford Youths | 28 | 11 | 6 | 11 | 45 | 40 | +5 | 39 | |
| 5 | Finn Harps | 28 | 10 | 6 | 12 | 40 | 43 | −3 | 36 | |
| 6 | Athlone Town | 28 | 8 | 5 | 15 | 25 | 41 | −16 | 29 | |
| 7 | Mervue United | 28 | 6 | 5 | 17 | 34 | 49 | −15 | 23 | |
| 8 | SD Galway (Note: Salthill Devon changed their name to SD Galway) | 28 | 5 | 5 | 18 | 23 | 51 | −28 | 20 | |

(C) Champions; (P) Promoted

== Results ==
=== Matches 1–14 ===
| Home \ Away | ATH | FHA | LIM | LON | MER | SDG | WAT | WEX |
|---|---|---|---|---|---|---|---|---|
| Athlone Town | | 2–0 | 0–1 | 1–2 | 2–1 | 2–1 | 1–4 | 0–1 |
| Finn Harps | 1–2 | | 1–3 | 1–3 | 4–3 | 3–0 | 0–1 | 0–1 |
| Limerick | 2–1 | 2–1 | | 1–2 | 2–0 | 3–0 | 0–1 | 4–0 |
| Longford Town | 2–1 | 1–3 | 0–2 | | 4–2 | 1–0 | 3–2 | 1–0 |
| Mervue United | 0–1 | 3–0 | 1–2 | 0–1 | | 1–2 | 0–0 | 3–0 |
| SD Galway | 0–1 | 1–5 | 2–5 | 1–1 | 2–2 | | 0–2 | 1–1 |
| Waterford United | 1–1 | 0–2 | 3–1 | 0–2 | 3–1 | 1–0 | | 4–0 |
| Wexford Youths | 1–2 | 3–0 | 0–1 | 1–2 | 2–0 | 2–0 | 6–0 | |

Source: www.rsssf.com
Legend: Blue = home team win; Yellow = draw; Red = away team win.

=== Matches 15–28 ===
| Home \ Away | ATH | FHA | LIM | LON | MER | SDG | WAT | WEX |
|---|---|---|---|---|---|---|---|---|
| Athlone Town | | 1–1 | 0–1 | 1–1 | 0–3 | 2–0 | 2–3 | 0–3 |
| Finn Harps | 2–0 | | 1–1 | 1–0 | 3–2 | 2–0 | 1–2 | 3–3 |
| Limerick | 1–0 | 3–0 | | 0–0 | 4–0 | 1–0 | 0–1 | 1–3 |
| Longford Town | 0–0 | 0–1 | 0–2 | | 2–0 | 1–2 | 0–1 | 2–0 |
| Mervue United | 2–0 | 1–1 | 0–3 | 4–5 | | 0–0 | 0–2 | 0–0 |
| SD Galway | 3–0 | 2–0 | 0–1 | 1–3 | 2–1 | | 0–1 | 2–2 |
| Waterford United | 0–0 | 1–1 | 2–1 | 4–2 | 1–2 | 3–0 | | 1–2 |
| Wexford Youths | 4–2 | 2–2 | 1–3 | 1–1 | 1–2 | 4–1 | 1–2 | |

Source: www.rsssf.com
Legend: Blue = home team win; Yellow = draw; Red = away team win.

== Promotion/relegation play-off ==
The second and third placed First Division teams, Waterford United and Longford Town, played off to decide who would play Dundalk, the eleventh placed team from the Premier Division. The winner of this play off would play in the 2013 Premier Division.

First Division

| 20 October 2012 | Longford Town | 0–2 | Waterford United | Flancare Park |
| | | [ Report] | Peter White 1'; Craig Burns 52' | Attendance: 550; Referee: Kevin O'Regan (Kerry) |

| 26 October 2012 | Waterford United | 1–1 | Longford Town | Waterford RSC |
| | Kirby (?) | [ Report] | Peter Higgins 9' | Referee: Keith Callanan |

Waterford United win 3–1 on aggregate

First Division v Premier Division

| 30 October 2012 | Dundalk | 2–2 | Waterford United | Oriel Park |
| | Lorcan Shannon 23'; Stephen McDonnell 75' | [ Report] | Paul Phelan 50'; Ben Ryan 60' | Referee: Paul McLaughlin (Monaghan) |

| 2 November 2012 | Waterford United | 0–2 | Dundalk | Waterford RSC |
| | | [ Report] | Michael Rafter 45', 68' | Attendance: 3,000; Referee: Padraig Sutton (Clare) |

Dundalk win 4–2 on aggregate and retained their place in the Premier Division. Waterford United appealed the result of the playoff, claiming Michael Rafter was ineligible as Dundalk had incorrectly registered him when they signed him earlier that season. However the appeal was unsuccessful.

== Top scorers ==
| Rank | Scorer | Club | Goals |
|---|---|---|---|
| 1 | (Republic of Ireland) Danny Furlong | Wexford Youths | 13 |
| 1 | (Republic of Ireland) Kevin McHugh | Finn Harps | 13 |
| 1 | (Republic of Ireland) Sean Maguire | Waterford United | 13 |
| 4 | (Republic of Ireland) Tom Elmes | Wexford Youths | 11 |
| 5 | (Republic of Ireland) Shane Tracy | Limerick | 10 |
| 5 | (Republic of Ireland) Rory Gaffney | Limerick | 10 |

== See also ==
- 2012 League of Ireland Premier Division
- 2012 League of Ireland Cup
