= 2015 League of Ireland Cup =

EA Sports Cup

Tournament details
- Country: Republic of Ireland
- Dates: 9 March – 19 September
- Teams: 24

Final positions
- Champions: St. Patrick's Athletic
- Runners-up: Galway United

Tournament statistics
- Matches played: 23

The 2015 League of Ireland Cup, known for sponsorship reasons as the 2015 EA Sports Cup, was the 42nd season of the League of Ireland's secondary knockout competition. The EA Sports Cup features teams from the SSE Airtricity League Premier and First Divisions, as well as some intermediate level teams.

== Teams ==
Pool 1	Pool 2	Pool 3	Pool 4
Cobh Ramblers; Cork City *; Limerick; Waterford United *; Wexford Youths; UCC	Cockhill Celtic *; Derry City *; Finn Harps; Galway United; Mayo League; Sligo Rovers	Bray Wanderers; Crumlin United; Drogheda United; Dundalk *; St Patrick's Athletic *; Shelbourne	Athlone Town; Bohemians; Cabinteely; Longford Town *; Shamrock Rovers *; University College Dublin

Clubs denoted with * received a bye into Second Round

== First round ==
The draw for the First Round took place on 10 February 2015. The First Round games were played on 9 and 10 March 2015.

9 March 2015	Galway United	3–2	Finn Harps	Eamonn Deacy Park
19:45	Padraic Cunningham 21'; Gary Shanahan 36'; Jake Keegan 66' (pen.)	Report	Brian McGroary 57'; Keith Cowan 75'	Attendance: 250 (Est.); Referee: Robert Hennessy

9 March 2015	UCD	0–1	Cabinteely	UCD Bowl
19:45		Report	Shane O'Neill 90+3'	Attendance: 206; Referee: Ben Connolly

10 March 2015	Bohemians	3–0	Athlone Town	Dalymount Park
19:45	Marc Griffin 29'; Marc Griffin 44'; Jake Hyland 73'	Report		Attendance: 300 (Est.); Referee: Adriano Reale

10 March 2015	Drogheda United	0–1	Shelbourne	Hunky Dorys Park
19:45		Report	Mark Sandford 49'	Attendance: ??? Referee: Tomas Connolly

10 March 2015	Sligo Rovers	8–0	Mayo League	Showgrounds
19:45	Morten Nielsen 27'; Gary Armstrong 45+1'; Gary Armstrong 50'; Sander Puri 56'; Rafaele Cretaro 60' (pen.); Liam Flatley 64'; Liam Flatley 85'; Liam Flatley 89'	Report		Attendance: ??? Referee: Ray Matthews

10 March 2015	Wexford Youths	1–2	UCC	Ferrycarraig Park
19:45	Peter Higgins 86'	Report	Ian Mylod 17'; Ian Mylod 22'	Attendance: ??? Referee: Brian Nolan

10 March 2015	Cobh Ramblers	3–2 (a.e.t.)	Limerick	St Colman's Park
20:00	Ronan Stanton 5'; Ryan Goldsmith 95'; Kynan Rocks 98'	Report	Dean Clarke 14'; Paul O'Conor 105'	Attendance: 200 (Est.); Referee: Anthony Matthews

10 March 2015	Crumlin United	4–2	Bray Wanderers	Pearse Park
20:00	Kevin Dempsey 26' (pen.); James Lee 29'; Greg Moorehouse 66'; Greg Moorehouse 88'	Report	Ryan McEvoy 6'; Graham Kelly 33'	Attendance: 100 (Est.); Referee: Paul Tuite

== Second round ==
The draw for the second round took place on 18 March. The draw was regionalised, based on geographical pools. Ties were played on Monday 6 and Tuesday 7 April.

6 April 2015	Waterford United	0–2	Cork City	RSC
15:00		Report	Ross Gaynor 47' (pen.); Gavan Holohan (red card) 65'; Rob Lehane 78'	Attendance: 408; Referee: Sean Grant

6 April 2015	Sligo Rovers	0–2 (a.e.t.)	Derry City	Showgrounds
16:00	Daniel Ledwith (red card) 77'	Report	Seamus Sharkey 103'; Mark Timlin 113'	Attendance: 837; Referee: Ray Matthews

6 April 2015	Galway United	4–2	Cockhill Celtic	Eamonn Deacy Park
15:00	Andy O'Connell 21'; Ryan Connolly (penalty missed) 41'; Padraic Cunningham 58', 66'; Gary Shanahan 71'	Report	James Bradley 4'; Mark Moran 90+1'	Attendance: 200 (Est.); Referee: Robert Hennessey

6 April 2015	Cabinteely	0–2	Shamrock Rovers	Stradbrook Road
19:00		Report	Sean O'Connor 58'; Brandon Miele 64'	Attendance: 1,000 (Est.); Referee: Adriano Reale

7 April 2015	Dundalk	1–0	Shelbourne	Oriel Park
19:45	John Mountney 11'	Report		Attendance: 697; Referee: Rob Harvey

7 April 2015	Bohemians	3–1	Longford Town	Dalymount Park
19:45	Jason Byrne 28'; James O'Brien 38'; Kealan Dillon 78'	Report	Ayman Ben Mohamed 13'	Attendance: 440; Referee: David McKeon

7 April 2015	Crumlin United	1–4	St Patrick's Athletic	Richmond Park
19:45	Patrick Cannon 55'	Report	Sam Verdon 15'; Ross Carrig 67' (o.g.); James Chambers 71'; Sam Verdon 74'	Attendance: 487; Referee: Rob Rogers

7 April 2015	UCC	3–2	Cobh Ramblers	The Mardyke
20:00	Cian Hill 27'; Cian Murphy 52'; Sean O'Mahony 90+4'	Report	Robert Waters 88'; Robert Waters 90+3'	Attendance: 430 (Est.); Referee: Anthony Buttimer

== Quarter finals ==
The draw for the quarter-finals took place on Wednesday 15 April. The draw was an open draw, following on from previous draws made on a regional basis. Ties were played Monday 18 and Tuesday 19 May.

18 May 2015	Galway United	1–0 (a.e.t.)	Bohemians	Eamonn Deacy Park
19:45	Jake Keegan 93'	Report		Attendance: 600 (Est.); Referee: Padraig Sutton

18 May 2015	UCC	0–5	Dundalk	The Mardyke
20:00		Report	Ciaran O'Connor 3'; Jake Kelly 13'; Paddy Barrett 36'; Paddy Barrett 55'; Kurtis Byrne 78'	Attendance: 650 (Est.); Referee: David Keeler

19 May 2015	Cork City	1–1 (a.e.t.) (3–5 p)	St Patrick's Athletic	Turners Cross
19:45	Liam Kearney 64'	Report	Jack Bayly 60'	Attendance: 930; Referee: Sean Grant
	Penalties
	Garry Buckley (penalty missed); Mark O'Sullivan (penalty scored); Ross Gaynor (penalty scored); Billy Dennehy (penalty scored)		Killian Brennan (penalty scored); Conan Byrne (penalty scored); James Chambers (penalty scored); Conor McCormack (penalty scored); Chris Forrester (penalty scored)

19 May 2015	Derry City	0–1	Shamrock Rovers	The Brandywell
19:45		Report	Sean O'Connor 35'	Attendance: 750 (Est.); Referee: Rob Harvey

== Semi finals ==
Ties were played Monday 3 August.

3 August 2015	Shamrock Rovers	0–0 (a.e.t.) (2–4 p)	St Patrick's Athletic	Tallaght Stadium
16:00	Ryan Brennan (yellow card) 120+2'	Report	Killian Brennan (yellow card) 82'; Morgan Langley (yellow card) 120+2'	Attendance: 2,200 (Est.); Referee: Paul Tuite
	Penalties
	Gary McCabe (penalty scored); Danny North (penalty scored); Michael Drennan (penalty missed); David O'Connor (penalty missed)		Killian Brennan (penalty missed); Aaron Greene (penalty scored); Conan Byrne (penalty scored); James Chambers (penalty scored); Ian Morris (penalty scored)

3 August 2015	Galway United	0–0 (a.e.t.) (4–2 p)	Dundalk	Eamonn Deacy Park
17:00	Alex Byrne (yellow card) 113'	Report	Ronan Finn (yellow card) 44'; Darren Meenan (yellow card) 78'	Referee: Ray Matthews
	Penalties
	Stephen Walsh (penalty scored); David O'Leary (penalty scored); Jake Keegan (penalty scored); Colm Horgan (penalty scored)		Ronan Finn (penalty missed); David McMillan (penalty missed); Daryl Horgan (penalty scored); John Mountney (penalty scored)

== Final ==
The EA Sports Cup Final was played on Saturday 19 September. The match took place at Eamonn Deacy Park, following a coin-toss for home advantage, and was screened live on Setanta Sports. St Patrick's Athletic won the tie on penalties, following a scoreless draw.

19 September 2015
18.05

Galway United	0–0 (a.e.t.)	St Patrick's Athletic*
	Report
Penalties
Ryan Connolly (penalty scored); Jake Keegan (penalty missed); Stephen Walsh (penalty scored); Colm Horgan (penalty scored); Andy O'Connell (penalty missed)	3–4	Conan Byrne (penalty scored); James Chambers (penalty scored); Chris Fagan (penalty scored); Ian Morris (penalty scored); Sean Hoare (penalty missed)

Eamonn Deacy Park
Attendance: 3,662
Referee: Paul McLaughlin
