= Finn Park =

Association football stadium in Ballybofey, Ireland

Coordinates: 54.798°N 7.7785°W

Finn Park Páirc na Finne
- Páirc na Finne
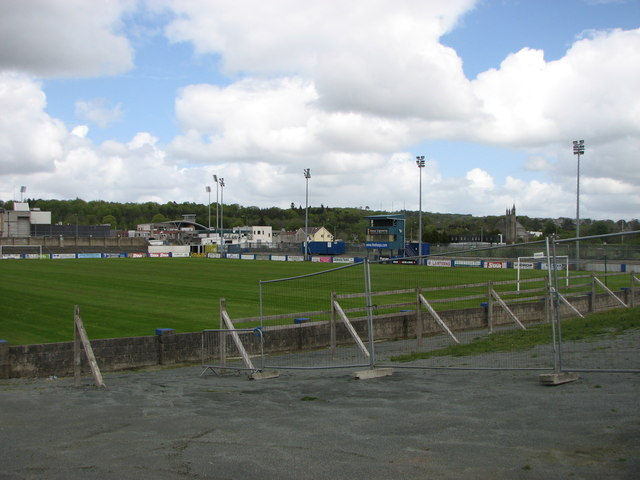
- View across the pitch
- Interactive map of Finn Park; Páirc na Finne
- Full name: Finn Park
- Address: Navenny Street
- Location: Ballybofey, County Donegal, Ireland
- Elevation: 17 m (56 ft)
- Owner: Finn Park Trust
- Operator: Finn Harps F.C.
- Capacity: 4,458 (351 seated)
- Surface: Grass
- Scoreboard: Yes
- Record attendance: 6,500 v Derry City in 2003
- Field size: 100.5 by 73.1 metres (110 × 80 yds)
- Public transit: Ballybofey Main Street bus stop (McElhineys)

Construction
- Opened: 1954

Tenant
- Finn Harps F.C. 1954–present

Finn Park (Irish: Páirc na Finne) is a football stadium in Ballybofey, County Donegal in Ireland. The home ground of League of Ireland team Finn Harps, it has a 'safe capacity' of 4,200 with 351 seats. The first recorded Finn Harps game in Finn Park was in May 1954. Finn Park hosted its first League of Ireland game in 1969.

Finn Park hosted the amateur Republic of Ireland national football team against Yugoslavia in a qualifier for the 1972 Summer Olympics in April 1971.

== Facilities ==
The ground is in a relatively dilapidated condition, although upgraded to modern safety standards. Only three sides are officially open, the covered "Shed" with mixed seating/terracing on the Navenny Road side with a capacity of 1,505, the large "Town End" terrace on the Chestnut Road side with capacity 1,748, and the "Gantry" viewing slope capacity 1,195, which is rarely used by home fans and houses the television/radio gantry. The "River End" embankment is officially closed and is generally used for ambulance parking. Fan segregation is rarely officially in existence and effectively unenforced.

=== The Shed ===
The Main Stand, also known as 'the Shed', is a covered stand that backs onto Navenny Street and runs for almost the entire length of the pitch. The stand has a block of 350 seats located near the halfway line; the remainder of the stand is open terracing.

The entrance to the away section is also on Navenny Street, via a turnstile on one side of the Main Stand. In addition, this part of the ground houses the clubhouse, press area and tuck shop with two dressing rooms in the clubhouse.

=== Town End ===
The north terrace, also known as the 'Town End', is an uncovered terrace behind the northern goal. It backs onto the Chestnut Road side of the ground. Favoured by home supporters, this end consists of a stepped terrace with a concrete rear perimeter wall.

=== Gantry Side ===
The east terrace, facing the Shed, is called the ‘Gantry Side’. This is because it is dominated by a tall television gantry which sits astride the half way line. To either side are portions of open terrace that are made up of four wide steps. Away fans are accommodated in this terrace with entry available through Chestnut Road.

In August 2020, the club raised in excess of €30,000 to meet COVID-19 restrictions within the ground. This allowed them to add four new units to the back of the Gantry Side terrace including a new dressing room, medical room and toilets. The club shop is also located on this side of the stadium. In July 2025, a bar was added to this area.

=== River End ===
Behind the southern goal, opposite the 'Town End' is the embankment known as the 'River End'. It derives the name from the River Finn which runs behind this section of the ground. The River end has a small sloped area for standing, just wide enough to drive a vehicle along it. The scoreboard is located in the corner, between the River End and the Shed.

=== Pitch and surroundings ===
The pitch at the ground measures approximately 100 metres (110 yd) long by 73 metres (80 yd) wide, and uses a grass surface.

In 2020, with Covid-19 restrictions effectively restricting the use of the usual dressing room and clubhouse layout, Finn Harps embarked upon a project to upgrade the dressing room facilities in Finn Park with the installation of a new home dressing room, medical area, shower room, kit room and wash room, and a kitchen on the Gantry Side of the ground. The previous home team dressing room did become the away dressing room area with two teams entering the pitch from different gates as a result, but this was reverted in 2024 with the home side now entering via the clubhouse way.

In August 2025, the club renamed the hospitality room at Finn Park to the Wilkinson Suite, after former chairman, Derek Wilkinson.

== Future plans ==
Plans for a new Finn Harps Stadium across the River Finn in Stranorlar date back as far as January 2005. Construction on a 6,600 all-seater stadium began in May 2008 with a completion date set for 2010. However, the end of the Celtic Tiger brought an economic recession and the project stalled. Despite continued efforts by the club, work halted on the ground in November 2014 with virtually all work ceasing by 2016. Fresh design plans for the ground were drawn up in August 2019 to help the club move forward. However, following a mixture of issues with government funding and COVID-19, work again stalled on the project.

After a provisional allocation of €4m from the government in 2021, Finn Harps revised their stadium plans in May 2022 to reduce costs and set a new target completion date of 2024. By September 2024, the club had to reapply for planning permission in the hope of resuming stadium construction in 2025 although no target completion date was provided.

=== Home ground for Finn Harps Women ===
While the club explored options of selling Finn Park to help fund the development of the new stadium, they decided to keep the Navenny Street venue as a home for its female teams. To develop girls' football, Finn Harps received a grant to replace the grass pitch with artificial turf, aiming to have this laid in time for the 2026 League of Ireland season.
