= Strokestown Road =

Football stadium in Longford, Ireland

Bishopsgate
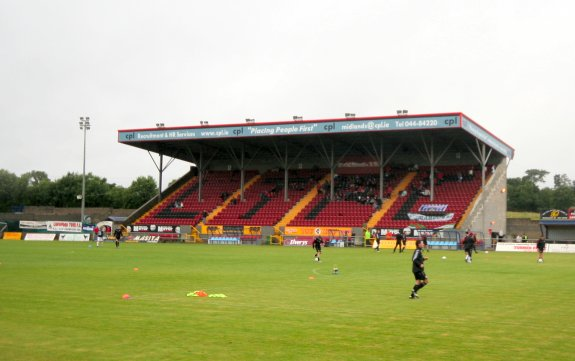
- Main stand at the stadium
- Interactive map of Bishopsgate
- Former names: Strokestown Road, Lissanurlan, Flancare Park (2001–2012); City Calling Stadium (2013–2019)
- Location: Strokestown Road, Longford, County Longford, Ireland
- Coordinates: 53.724°N 7.854°W
- Owner: Longford Town F.C.
- Capacity: 5,097 (4,977 seated, 120 standing)
- Surface: Grass
- Scoreboard: Digital
- Public transit: Longford railway station

Construction
- Built: 1994

Tenant
- Longford Town F.C.

Strokestown Road, known as Bishopsgate for sponsorship purposes since 2019, is a football stadium in Longford, Ireland which is the home of League of Ireland club Longford Town. Originally built in 1994, the stadium was known as Flancare Park from 2001 to 2012, and as City Calling Stadium from 2013 until 2019. It is located on the Strokestown Road (N5 road) to the west of Longford Town.

== History ==
Strokestown Road was built in 1994 as the new home ground of Longford Town Football Club. The club moved to the venue from their old ground at Abbeycartron in the summer of 1994. The stadium is owned by the club, and it is one of the few League of Ireland grounds to be entirely club-owned.

The stadium underwent a significant redevelopment at the end of 2000–01 season. Prior to this, while containing a good pitch and floodlights, the ground had poor facilities along with two terraced (one uncovered) stands and a single-seater stand. The club's promotion to the Premier Division in 2000 was seen as a catalyst in the redevelopment of the ground to its present-day form. Through the receipt of government and FAI grant aid, it was fully redeveloped into an all-seater stadium by July 2001. The ground's capacity is 5,097.

The ground became known as Flancare Park, after the club's then sponsor Flancare, in early 2001 until the arrangement finished at the end of 2013. During this time the ground held a number of international underage matches, including a 2002 UEFA Under-21 European Championship qualifier against Cyprus. The stadium also hosted three UEFA Cup ties and staged the 2004 League Cup final (which Longford won). It was affectionately referred to by League of Ireland fans as the 'Flan Siro'; a play on the name of Flancare Park and on the name of the well-known San Siro stadium in Milan, Italy.

In 2013, the ground was renamed to City Calling Stadium. This name change was related to the club's then newly acquired main sponsor City Calling Group, a recruitment agency. In 2018, the stadium received a 'Pitch of the Year' award from the Football Association of Ireland (FAI). The stadium was selected as a venue for the 2019 UEFA European Under-17 Championship as part of Ireland's hosting of the tournament. Four group stage matches were held at the ground, including a match between England and France on 3 May 2019.

In November 2019, the ground was renamed Bishopsgate after the club's main sponsor. Bishopsgate is a UK-headquartered payroll administration, employment and contractor support services company.

Damage to a stadium wall, which occurred during Storm Éowyn, was the subject of a fundraising campaign in 2025. The damage was repaired by October 2025.

== Location ==
Located to the west of Longford town, the ground is situated in the townland of Mullolagher on Strokestown Road (N5) between Longford and Tarmonbarry.
