= 2023 Galway United F.C. season =

Irish football club season

Galway United
2023 season
- Manager: John Caulfield
- Stadium: Eamonn Deacy Park
- First Division: 1st (promoted)
- FAI Cup: Semi-finals
- Top goalscorer: League: David Hurley (21); All: David Hurley (24)
- Highest home attendance: 4,300; 0–1 v Bohemians; 7 October 2023 (FAI Cup)
- Lowest home attendance: 566; 3–1 v Waterford; 10 October 2023 (First Division)
- Biggest win: 9–1 v Kerry; 10 March 2023 (Home, First Division)
Home colours	Away colours	Third colours

The 2023 Galway United F.C. season was the football club's 45th season in the League of Ireland and their sixth consecutive season in the League of Ireland First Division since being relegated in 2017.

The club finished the season in 1st, winning the league and gaining promotion with a massive 98 points. The club also had 18 wins out of 18 games at home in the league during the season.

The club also made it to the Semi-finals of the FAI Cup before being knocked out by Bohemians. It was the furthest the club had made in the competition since 2008.

== Squad ==
#	Name	Nationality	Position	Date of birth (age)	Previous Club	Signed	Notes
Goalkeepers
1	Brendan Clarke	(Republic of Ireland)	GK	September 17, 1985 (aged 38)	(Republic of Ireland) Shelbourne	2023	
16	Alex Rutter	(England)	GK	April 26, 2001 (aged 22)	(Australia) Hume City	2023	
26	Sean Barron	(Republic of Ireland)	GK	December 9, 1993 (aged 29)	(Republic of Ireland) Avondale United	2023	
32	Kieran McDonagh	(Republic of Ireland)	GK	April 5, 2005 (aged 18)	(Republic of Ireland) Academy	2023	
Defenders
2	Conor O'Keeffe	(Republic of Ireland)	DF	September 19, 1993 (aged 30)	(Northern Ireland) Newry City	2021	
3	Regan Donelon	(Republic of Ireland)	DF	April 17, 1996 (aged 27)	(Republic of Ireland) Finn Harps	2023	
4	Rob Slevin	(Republic of Ireland)	DF	July 14, 1998 (aged 25)	(Republic of Ireland) Finn Harps	2023	
5	Killian Brouder	(Republic of Ireland)	DF	August 20, 1998 (aged 25)	(Republic of Ireland) Limerick	2019	
6	Maurice Nugent	(Republic of Ireland)	DF	July 30, 1998 (aged 25)	(England) Uxbridge	2023	
20	Evan O'Connor	(Republic of Ireland)	DF	September 20, 2000 (aged 23)	(Republic of Ireland) Regional United	2022	
21	Colm Horgan	(Republic of Ireland)	DF	July 2, 1994 (aged 29)	(Republic of Ireland) Sligo Rovers	2023	
29	Oisín O'Reilly	(Republic of Ireland)	DF	November 27, 2000 (aged 22)	(Republic of Ireland) Athlone Town	2022	
Midfielders
10	David Hurley	(Republic of Ireland)	MF	October 21, 1998 (aged 24)	(Republic of Ireland) Cobh Ramblers	2021	
12	Aodh Dervin	(Republic of Ireland)	MF	July 21, 1999 (aged 24)	(Republic of Ireland) Shelbourne	2023	
14	Ronan Manning	(Republic of Ireland)	MF	May 15, 2000 (aged 23)	(Republic of Ireland) Athlone Town	2021	
15	Callum McNamara	(Republic of Ireland)	MF	January 29, 2001 (aged 22)	(Republic of Ireland) Treaty United	2023	
17	Vincent Borden	(United States)	MF	February 21, 1999 (aged 24)	(Slovenia) Rudar Velenje	2023	
22	Conor McCormack	(Republic of Ireland)	MF	May 18, 1990 (aged 33)	(Republic of Ireland) Derry City	2021	Captain
23	Darren Clarke	(Republic of Ireland)	MF	October 6, 1996 (aged 27)	(Republic of Ireland) Longford Town	2023	
24	Ed McCarthy	(Republic of Ireland)	MF	April 20, 2001 (aged 22)	(Republic of Ireland) Regional United	2022	
27	Steven Healy	(Republic of Ireland)	MF	July 3, 2004 (aged 19)	(Republic of Ireland) Academy	2022	
28	Mikey McCullagh	(Republic of Ireland)	MF	November 7, 2004 (aged 18)	(Republic of Ireland) Academy	2022	
Forwards
7	Stephen Walsh	(Republic of Ireland)	FW	August 29, 1990 (aged 33)	(Republic of Ireland) Galway Hibernians	2018	
9	Rob Manley	(Republic of Ireland)	FW	August 24, 1997 (aged 26)	(Republic of Ireland) Bray Wanderers	2022	
18	David Tarmey	(Republic of Ireland)	FW	September 2, 2004 (aged 19)	(Republic of Ireland) Academy	2022	
19	Francely Lomboto	(Republic of Ireland)	FW	July 2, 2000 (aged 23)	(Republic of Ireland) Galway Hibernians	2020	
25	Aaron Neary	(Republic of Ireland)	FW	May 12, 2003 (aged 20)	(Republic of Ireland) Mervue United	2022	
30	Brian Cunningham	(Republic of Ireland)	FW	September 3, 2006 (aged 17)	(Republic of Ireland) Mervue United	2023	
31	Wassim Aouachria	(Algeria)	FW	May 12, 2000 (aged 23)	(Republic of Ireland) Waterford	2023	
Players who departed before the end of the season
8	Mikie Rowe	(Republic of Ireland)	MF	July 3, 1996 (aged 27)	(United States) Tormenta	2021	Loaned Out
11	Ibrahim Keita	(France)	FW	January 18, 1996 (aged 27)	(Czech Republic) Bohemians 1905	2023	

=== Transfers ===
==== In ====
Date	Position	Nationality	Name	Last club	Ref.
26 November 2022	GK	(Republic of Ireland)	Brendan Clarke	(Republic of Ireland) Shelbourne	
30 November 2022	DF	(Republic of Ireland)	Rob Slevin	(Republic of Ireland) Finn Harps	
1 December 2022	MF	(Republic of Ireland)	Darren Clarke	(Republic of Ireland) Longford Town	
9 December 2022	MF	(Republic of Ireland)	Callum McNamara	(Republic of Ireland) Treaty United	
13 December 2022	DF	(Republic of Ireland)	Maurice Nugent	(England) Uxbridge	
15 December 2022	DF	(Republic of Ireland)	Regan Donelon	(Republic of Ireland) Finn Harps	
3 January 2023	MF	(United States)	Vincent Borden	(Slovenia) Rudar Velenje	
15 February 2023	FW	(France)	Ibrahim Keita	(Czech Republic) Bohemians 1905	
20 January 2023	DF	(Republic of Ireland)	Colm Horgan	(Republic of Ireland) Sligo Rovers	
28 January 2023	GK	(England)	Alex Rutter	(Australia) Hume City	
4 July 2023	FW	(Algeria)	Wassim Aouachria	(Republic of Ireland) Waterford	
6 July 2023	MF	(Republic of Ireland)	Aodh Dervin	(Republic of Ireland) Longford Town	
17 July 2023	GK	(Republic of Ireland)	Sean Barron	(Republic of Ireland) Avondale United	

==== Out ====
Date	Position	Nationality	Name	To	Ref.
18 November 2022	GK	(Republic of Ireland)	Conor Kearns	(Republic of Ireland) Shelbourne	
9 December 2022	MF	(England)	Max Hemmings	(England) Weymouth	
31 December 2022	DF	(Republic of Ireland)	Charlie Lyons	(Republic of Ireland) Cobh Ramblers	
3 January 2023	GK	(Republic of Ireland)	Matthew Connor	(Republic of Ireland) Waterford	
4 January 2023	DF	(Republic of Ireland)	Gary Boylan	(Republic of Ireland) Sligo Rovers	

==== Loan Out ====
Date	Position	Nationality	Name	To	Date until	Ref.
24 January 2023	FW	(Republic of Ireland)	Wilson Waweru	(Republic of Ireland) Cobh Ramblers	1 November 2024	
12 July 2023	MF	(Republic of Ireland)	Mikie Rowe	(Republic of Ireland) Cobh Ramblers	1 November 2024	

== Club ==
=== Coaching staff ===
- Manager: John Caulfield
- Assistant Manager: Ollie Horgan
- Technical Coach: Chris Collopy
- Goalkeeping Coach: Gianluca Aimi
- Strength and Conditioning Coach: Danny Broderick
- Physiotherapist: Richard Grier
- Analyst: Robert Crosbie
- Kitman: Darra Hislop

== Competitions ==
=== League of Ireland First Division ===
==== League Table ====
Pos	Team	Pld	W	D	L	GF	GA	GD	Pts	Promotion or qualification
1	Galway United (C, P)	36	30	4	2	98	18	+80	94	Promotion to League of Ireland Premier Division
2	Waterford (O, P)	36	20	9	7	84	32	+52	69	Qualification for League of Ireland Premier Division play-off
3	Cobh Ramblers	36	16	11	9	61	51	+10	59	Qualification for League of Ireland Premier Division play-off
4	Wexford	36	15	8	13	48	49	−1	53	Qualification for League of Ireland Premier Division play-off
5	Athlone Town	36	14	5	17	55	61	−6	47	Qualification for League of Ireland Premier Division play-off

Source: SSE Airtricity League of Ireland First Division
Rules for classification: 1) Points; 2) Goal difference; 3) Goals scored
(C) Champions; (O) Play-off winners; (P) Promoted

==== Results summary ====
Overall								Home						Away					
Pld	W	D	L	GF	GA	GD	Pts	W	D	L	GF	GA	GD	W	D	L	GF	GA	GD
36	30	4	2	98	18	+80	94	18	0	0	58	5	+53	12	4	2	40	13	+27

Last updated: 20 October 2023.

==== Results by round ====
Round	1	2	3	4	5	6	7	8	9	10	11	12	13	14	15	16	17	18	19	20	21	22	23	24	25	26	27	28	29	30	31	32	33	34	35	36
Ground	A	H	A	H	A	H	A	A	H	A	H	A	H	H	A	H	A	H	A	H	H	A	A	H	A	H	A	H	A	A	A	H	H	H	A	H
Result	W	W	W	W	W	W	W	W	W	W	W	L	W	W	W	W	D	W	W	W	W	D	W	W	D	W	D	W	L	W	W	W	W	W	W	W
Position	4	4	1	1	1	1	1	1	1	1	1	1	1	1	1	1	1	1	1	1	1	1	1	1	1	1	1	1	1	1	1	1	1	1	1	1

Updated to match(es) played on 20 October 2023. Source: 2023 League of Ireland First Division
A = Away; H = Home; W = Win; D = Draw; L = Loss

==== Matches ====
Win Draw Loss

17 February 2023 1	Finn Harps	1–2	Galway United	Ballybofey, County Donegal
20:00 GMT	Rainey 43'	Report	Borden 5', 61'	Stadium: Finn Park; Attendance: 2,552; Referee: David Dunne

24 February 2023 2	Galway United	1–0	Treaty United	Terryland, County Galway
19:45 GMT	Slevin 37'	Report		Stadium: Eamonn Deacy Park; Attendance: 2,305; Referee: Mark Moynihan

3 March 2023 3	Waterford	0–1	Galway United	Waterford, County Waterford
19:45 GMT		Report	Borden 22'	Stadium: RSC; Attendance: 2,581; Referee: Alan Patchell

10 March 2023 4	Galway United	9–1	Kerry	Terryland, County Galway
19:45 GMT	McCarthy 8', 21', 45+1'; Slevin 32'; Lomboto 35'; Keita 68', 73'; Walsh 87' (pen.), 90+2'	Report	Kelliher 65'	Stadium: Eamonn Deacy Park; Attendance: 1,870; Referee: Gavin Colfer

17 March 2023 5	Cobh Ramblers	0–2	Galway United	Cobh, County Cork
17:00 GMT		Report	Borden 35'; Manning 63'	Stadium: St Colman's Park; Attendance: 1,610; Referee: Eoghan O'Shea

24 March 2023 6	Galway United	1–0	Longford Town	Terryland, County Galway
19:45 GMT	Walsh (penalty missed) 4'; Clarke 37'	Report		Stadium: Eamonn Deacy Park; Attendance: 1,668; Referee: Declan Toland

31 March 2023 7	Athlone Town	1–3	Galway United	Lissywollen, Athlone
19:45 GMT	Pierrot 35'	Report	Hurley (penalty missed) 33' 38', 61'; Walsh 76'	Stadium: Athlone Town Stadium; Attendance: 1,138; Referee: Paul Norton

7 April 2023 8	Wexford	0–4	Galway United	Crossabeg, County Wexford
19:45 GMT		Report	Hurley 45+1' (penalty missed) 88'; Lomboto 54'; Clarke 77'; Borden 82'	Stadium: Ferrycarrig Park; Attendance: 655; Referee: Alan Patchell

14 April 2023 9	Galway United	6–0	Longford Town	Terryland, County Galway
19:45 GMT	Brouder 10'; Borden 23', 65'; Hurley 29' (pen.); Rowe 74' (pen.); Keita 84'	Report		Stadium: Eamonn Deacy Park; Attendance: 2,411; Referee: Paul Norton

21 April 2023 10	Kerry	1–4	Galway United	Tralee, County Kerry
19:45 GMT	Kelliher 40'	Report	Hurley 45+1'; Walsh 50', 69'; Horgan 58'	Stadium: Mounthawk Park; Attendance: 929; Referee: Daniel Murphy

28 April 2023 11	Galway United	1–0	Cobh Ramblers	Terryland, County Galway
19:45 GMT	Borden 55'	Report		Stadium: Eamonn Deacy Park; Attendance: 4,300; Referee: Gavin Colfer

1 May 2023 12	Longford Town	1–0	Galway United	Longford, County Longford
19:45 GMT	Boudiaf 3'	Report		Stadium: Bishopsgate; Attendance: 1,016; Referee: Declan Toland

5 May 2023 13	Galway United	2–1	Waterford	Terryland, County Galway
19:45 GMT	McCarthy 33'; Hurley 69' (pen.)	Report	Coughlan 81'	Stadium: Eamonn Deacy Park; Attendance: 2,704; Referee: Kevin O'Sullivan

12 May 2023 14	Galway United	2–0	Wexford	Terryland, County Galway
19:45 GMT	Walsh 56', 70'	Report		Stadium: Eamonn Deacy Park; Attendance: 1,704; Referee: Paul Norton

19 May 2023 15	Treaty United	0–3	Galway United	Garryowen, Limerick
19:45 GMT	Spain (yellow card) 29' (yellow-red card) 60'	Report	Hurley 21' (pen.); Lomboto 42'; Keita 90+1'	Stadium: Markets Field; Attendance: 990; Referee: Chris Sheehan

26 May 2023 16	Galway United	3–1	Athlone Town	Terryland, County Galway
19:45 GMT	Hurley 12' (pen.); Walsh 52'; Brouder 71'	Report	Pierrot 65'	Stadium: Eamonn Deacy Park; Attendance: 1,705; Referee: Gavin Colfer

2 June 2023 17	Bray Wanderers	1–1	Galway United	Bray, County Wicklow
19:45 GMT	Lyons 49'	Report	Hurley 8' (pen.)	Stadium: Carlisle Grounds; Attendance: 791; Referee: David Dunne

5 June 2023 18	Galway United	6–0	Finn Harps	Terryland, County Galway
19:45 GMT	Clarke 4'; Brouder 11'; Walsh 16'; Nugent 19'; Manley 51'; Hurley 86' (pen.)	Report		Stadium: Eamonn Deacy Park; Attendance: 1,617; Referee: Adriano Reale

9 June 2023 19	Wexford	0–2	Galway United	Crossabeg, County Wexford
19:45 GMT		Report	McCormack 18'; McCarthy 58'	Stadium: Ferrycarrig Park; Attendance: 616; Referee: Chris Sheehan

23 June 2023 20	Galway United	4–0	Longford Town	Terryland, County Galway
19:45 GMT	Hurley 48', 87' (pen.); Slevin 53'; O'Keeffe 75'	Report		Stadium: Eamonn Deacy Park; Attendance: 1,502; Referee: Alan Patchell

30 June 2023 21	Galway United	1–0	Kerry	Terryland, County Galway
19:45 GMT	Nugent 10'	Report		Stadium: Eamonn Deacy Park; Attendance: 1,427; Referee: Kevin O'Sullivan

7 July 2023 22	Cobh Ramblers	1–1	Galway United	Cobh, County Cork
19:45 GMT	Phillips 2'; O'Sullivan-Connell (red card) 52'	Report	Hurley 43' (pen.)	Stadium: St Colman's Park; Attendance: 1,082; Referee: Declan Toland

14 July 2023 23	Athlone Town	0–1	Galway United	Lissywollen, Athlone
19:45 GMT		Report	Hurley 85'	Stadium: Athlone Town Stadium; Attendance: 1,257; Referee: Paul Norton

28 July 2023 24	Galway United	3–0	Bray Wanderers	Terryland, County Galway
19:45 GMT	Walsh 44', 55'; Hurley 80'	Report		Stadium: Eamonn Deacy Park; Attendance: 1,504; Referee: Oliver Moran

4 August 2023 25	Finn Harps	2–2	Galway United	Ballybofey, County Donegal
20:00 GMT	O'Donnell 46'; McCallion 90'	Report	Manning 16'; Borden (red card) 24'; Slevin 69'	Stadium: Finn Park; Attendance: 1,021; Referee: Paul Norton

7 August 2023 26	Galway United	3–0	Treaty United	Terryland, County Galway
17:00 GMT	Hurley 8' (pen.); Aouachria 40'; Manley 83'	Report		Stadium: Eamonn Deacy Park; Attendance: 1,521; Referee: Mark Houlihan

11 August 2023 27	Waterford	2–2	Galway United	Waterford, County Waterford
19:45 GMT	Coughlan 1', 22'	Report	Brouder 16'; Lomboto 90'	Stadium: RSC; Attendance: 1,953; Referee: Alan Patchell

25 August 2023 28	Galway United	4–1	Cobh Ramblers	Terryland, County Galway
19:45 GMT	Aouachria 34'; Borden 68'; Hurley 71', 80'	Report	Doherty 38'	Stadium: Eamonn Deacy Park; Attendance: 1,474; Referee: Gavin Colfer

2 September 2023 29	Longford Town	1–0	Galway United	Longford, County Longford
19:30 GMT	Măgerușan 30'	Report		Stadium: Bishopsgate; Attendance: 1,067; Referee: Paul McLaughlin

8 September 2023 30	Bray Wanderers	1–4	Galway United	Bray, County Wicklow
19:45 GMT	Groome 40'	Report	Walsh 34', 90+3', 90+4'; Hurley 67' (pen.)	Stadium: Carlisle Grounds; Attendance: 516; Referee: Paul Norton

22 September 2023 31	Kerry	0–4	Galway United	Tralee, County Kerry
19:45 GMT		Report	Aouachria 45+1'; Hurley 72' (pen.), 90+2'; Lomboto 85'	Stadium: Mounthawk Park; Attendance: 720; Referee: Alan Patchell

25 September 2023 32	Galway United	1–0	Finn Harps	Terryland, County Galway
19:45 GMT	Watson 41' (o.g.)	Report		Stadium: Eamonn Deacy Park; Attendance: 2,503; Referee: Adriano Reale

29 September 2023 33	Galway United	6–0	Athlone Town	Terryland, County Galway
19:45 GMT	Clarke 2', 60'; Walsh 4'; Manley 11', 84'; Borden 47'	Report		Stadium: Eamonn Deacy Park; Attendance: 2,325; Referee: Mark Houlihan

10 October 2023 34	Galway United	3–1	Waterford	Terryland, County Galway
19:45 GMT	McCarthy 19', 40'; Aouachria 54'	Report	Perry 86'	Stadium: Eamonn Deacy Park; Attendance: 566; Referee: Oliver Moran

14 October 2023 35	Treaty United	1–4	Galway United	Garryowen, Limerick
15:00 GMT	Walsh 64'	Report	McCarthy 5'; Walsh 38'; Lomboto 71'; Aouachria 75'	Stadium: Markets Field; Attendance: 730; Referee: David Connolly

20 October 2023 36	Galway United	2–0	Wexford	Terryland, County Galway
19:45 GMT	Aouachria 5'; Slevin 36'	Report		Stadium: Eamonn Deacy Park; Attendance: 3,104; Referee: Eoghan O'Shea

=== FAI Cup ===
Win Draw Loss

==== First Round ====
22 July 2023 First Round	Galway United	4–1	Bangor Celtic	Terryland, County Galway
17:00 GMT	Aouachria 14'; Walsh 39', 45+4'; Brouder 52'	Report	Maher 2'	Stadium: Eamonn Deacy Park; Attendance: 764; Referee: Alan Patchell

==== Second Round ====
21 August 2023 Second Round	UCD	1–5	Galway United	Belfield, Dublin 4
19:45 GMT	O'Reilly 86' (o.g.)	Report	Aouachria 5'; Hurley 15', 38'; Manning 45+1'; Manley 69'	Stadium: UCD Bowl; Attendance: 416; Referee: Rob Harvey
Note: Original fixture on 18 August abandoned at half time due to Storm Betty

==== Quarter-Final ====
23 September 2023 Quarter-final	Galway United	4–0	Dundalk	Terryland, County Galway
19:45 GMT	Walsh 8'; McCarthy 20'; Nugent 30'; Hurley 39' (pen.)	Report		Stadium: Eamonn Deacy Park; Attendance: 4,300; Referee: David Dunne

==== Semi-Final ====
7 October 2023 Semi-final	Galway United	0–1	Bohemians	Terryland, County Galway
14:40 GMT		Report	Connolly 44'; Radkowski (red card) 59'	Stadium: Eamonn Deacy Park; Attendance: 4,300; Referee: Neil Doyle

=== Friendlies ===
Win Draw Loss

==== Pre-season Friendlies ====
15 January 2023	Bohemians	2–1	Galway United	Phibsborough, Dublin 7
15:15 GMT	Afolabi; Connolly	Report	Manning	Stadium: Dalymount Park; Referee: Oliver Moran

20 January 2023	St Patrick's Athletic	1–1	Galway United	Inchicore, Dublin 8
17:00 GMT		Report	Manley	Stadium: Richmond Park; Referee: Adriano Reale

28 January 2023	Sligo Rovers	2–2	Galway United	Westport, County Mayo
14:00 GMT	Heaney 23'; Hartmann 38'		Hurley 25' (pen.), 42'	Stadium: United Park; Referee: Damien Macgraith

10 February 2023	Galway United	1–1	Shelbourne	Terryland, County Galway
19:30 GMT	Manning 35'			Stadium: Eamon Deacy Park; Referee: Declan Toland

==== Mid-season Friendlies ====
27 March 2023	Galway United	1–2	Sligo Rovers	Drom, County Galway
11:00 GMT	Nugent 90'		Heaney 26'; Cawley 60' (pen.)	Stadium: Drom Soccer Park; Referee: Marc Lynch

1 July 2023	Mayo League	0–4	Galway United	Castlebar, County Mayo
18:00 GMT				Stadium: Umbro Park; Referee: John Mulroe

== Statistics ==
=== Appearances and goals ===
This table shows all of the players who have featured in a first team squad for Galway United this season
Brackets denotes how many of the listed appearances were made as a substitute

No.	Pos.	Player	League		FAI Cup		Total	
No.	Pos.	Player	Apps	Goals	Apps	Goals	Apps	Goals
1	GK	(Republic of Ireland) Brendan Clarke	36	0	4	0	40	0
2	DF	(Republic of Ireland) Conor O'Keeffe	25(5)	1	2(2)	0	27	1
3	DF	(Republic of Ireland) Regan Donelon	23(5)	0	2	0	25	0
4	DF	(Republic of Ireland) Rob Slevin	33(2)	5	4(1)	0	37	5
5	DF	(Republic of Ireland) Killian Brouder	35(2)	4	4	1	39	5
6	DF	(Republic of Ireland) Maurice Nugent	30(15)	2	3(1)	1	33	3
7	FW	(Republic of Ireland) Stephen Walsh	35(1)	15	4	3	39	18
8	MF	(Republic of Ireland) Mikie Rowe	16(16)	1	0	0	16	1
9	FW	(Republic of Ireland) Rob Manley	23(17)	4	4(4)	1	27	5
10	MF	(Republic of Ireland) David Hurley	36(4)	21	4	3	40	24
11	FW	(France) Ibrahim Keita	9(7)	4	0	0	9	4
12	MF	(Republic of Ireland) Aodh Dervin	14(8)	0	4(1)	0	18	0
14	MF	(Republic of Ireland) Ronan Manning	19(5)	2	2	1	21	3
16	GK	(England) Alex Rutter	1(1)	0	0	0	1	0
17	MF	(United States) Vincent Borden	34(4)	10	4(1)	0	38	10
18	FW	(Republic of Ireland) David Tarmey	3(3)	0	1(1)	0	4	0
19	FW	(Republic of Ireland) Francely Lomboto	33(17)	6	4(3)	0	37	6
20	DF	(Republic of Ireland) Evan O'Connor	15(10)	0	2	0	17	0
21	DF	(Republic of Ireland) Colm Horgan	20(1)	1	0	0	20	1
22	MF	(Republic of Ireland) Conor McCormack	31(1)	1	2	0	33	1
23	MF	(Republic of Ireland) Darren Clarke	18(12)	5	2(2)	0	20	5
24	MF	(Republic of Ireland) Ed McCarthy	35(1)	8	3	1	38	9
25	FW	(Republic of Ireland) Aaron Neary	0	0	0	0	0	0
26	GK	(Republic of Ireland) Connal Doran	0	0	0	0	0	0
26	GK	(Republic of Ireland) Sean Barron	0	0	0	0	0	0
27	MF	(Republic of Ireland) Steven Healy	6(5)	0	0	0	6	0
28	MF	(Republic of Ireland) Mikey McCullagh	2(2)	0	0	0	2	0
28	MF	(Republic of Ireland) Daire McCarthy	2(2)	0	0	0	2	0
29	DF	(Republic of Ireland) Oisín O'Reilly	16(9)	0	3(2)	0	19	0
30	FW	(Republic of Ireland) Brian Cunningham	0	0	1(1)	0	1	0
31	FW	(Algeria) Wassim Aouachria	14(7)	6	4	2	18	8
32	GK	(Republic of Ireland) Kieran McDonagh	0	0	0	0	0	0

=== Clean sheets ===
No.	Player	League	FAI Cup	Total		
No.	Player	1	(Republic of Ireland) Brendan Clarke	20	1	21
16	(England) Alex Rutter	1	0	1		

=== Disciplinary record ===
No.	Player	League			FAI Cup			Total		
No.	Player	Yellow card	(yellow card) (yellow-red card)	Red card	Yellow card	(yellow card) (yellow-red card)	Red card	Yellow card	(yellow card) (yellow-red card)	Red card
7	Stephen Walsh	9	0	0	2	0	0	11	0	0
10	David Hurley	9	0	0	1	0	0	10	0	0
5	Killian Brouder	8	0	0	0	0	0	8	0	0
4	Rob Slevin	6	0	0	0	0	0	6	0	0
6	Maurice Nugent	5	0	0	0	0	0	5	0	0
14	Ronan Manning	5	0	0	0	0	0	5	0	0
22	Conor McCormack	4	0	0	1	0	0	5	0	0
31	Wassim Aouachria	4	0	0	1	0	0	5	0	0
3	Regan Donelon	3	0	0	1	0	0	4	0	0
9	Rob Manley	4	0	0	0	0	0	4	0	0
12	Aodh Dervin	2	0	0	2	0	0	4	0	0
20	Evan O'Connor	3	0	0	0	0	0	3	0	0
21	Colm Horgan	3	0	0	0	0	0	3	0	0
24	Ed McCarthy	2	1	0	0	0	0	2	1	0
29	Oisín O'Reilly	3	0	0	0	0	0	3	0	0
17	Vincent Borden	2	0	1	0	0	0	2	0	1
2	Conor O'Keeffe	2	0	0	0	0	0	2	0	0
19	Francely Lomboto	2	0	0	0	0	0	2	0	0
1	Brendan Clarke	1	0	0	0	0	0	1	0	0
8	Mikie Rowe	1	0	0	0	0	0	1	0	0
23	Darren Clarke	1	0	0	0	0	0	1	0	0
Totals		77	0	1	7	0	0	84	0	1
