= 2021 Galway United F.C. season =

Irish football club season

Galway United
2021 season
- Manager: John Caulfield
- Stadium: Eamonn Deacy Park
- First Division: 2nd (play-offs)
- FAI Cup: First round
- Top goalscorer: Ruairí Keating (9)
Home colours	Away colours

The 2021 Galway United F.C. season was the football club's 43rd season in the League of Ireland and their fourth consecutive season in the League of Ireland First Division since being relegated in 2017.

This was the club's first full season under manager, John Caulfield, after he had replaced Alan Murphy halfway through the previous season.

The club finished the season in 2nd, qualifying for the play-offs where they would lose to Bray Wanderers 0–1 over two legs in the semi-finals.

== Squad ==
#	Name	Nationality	Position	Date of birth (age)	Previous Club	Signed	Notes
Goalkeepers
1	Luke Dennison	(United States)	GK	August 21, 1996 (aged 25)	(Republic of Ireland) Longford Town	2021	Loan
16	Conor Kearns	(Republic of Ireland)	GK	May 6, 1998 (aged 23)	(Republic of Ireland) St Patrick's Athletic	2021	
Defenders
2	Conor O'Keeffe	(Republic of Ireland)	DF	September 19, 1993 (aged 28)	(Northern Ireland) Newry City	2021	
3	Stephen Walsh	(Republic of Ireland)	DF	August 29, 1990 (aged 31)	(Republic of Ireland) Galway Hibernians	2018	
4	Gary Boylan	(Republic of Ireland)	DF	April 24, 1996 (aged 25)	(Republic of Ireland) Cork City	2021	
5	Killian Brouder	(Republic of Ireland)	DF	August 20, 1998 (aged 23)	(Republic of Ireland) Limerick	2019	
6	Maurice Nugent	(Republic of Ireland)	DF	July 30, 1998 (aged 23)	(Republic of Ireland) Mervue United	2017	
8	Dean O'Shea	(Republic of Ireland)	DF	September 20, 2002 (aged 19)	(Republic of Ireland) Bray Wanderers	2021	
21	Christopher Horgan	(Republic of Ireland)	DF	October 27, 1999 (aged 22)	(Republic of Ireland) Salthill Devon	2018	
25	Alex Murphy	(Republic of Ireland)	DF	June 25, 2004 (aged 17)	(Republic of Ireland) Corrib Celtic	2021	
31	Ethan Connolly	(Republic of Ireland)	DF	November 11, 2001 (aged 19)	(Republic of Ireland) Mervue United	2021	
32	Joe Gorman	(Republic of Ireland)	DF	September 1, 1994 (aged 27)	(Republic of Ireland) Longford Town	2021	
Midfielders
10	David Hurley	(Republic of Ireland)	MF	October 21, 1998 (aged 23)	(Republic of Ireland) Cobh Ramblers	2021	
11	Shane Doherty	(United States)	MF	August 16, 1996 (aged 25)	(United States) Rowan	2019	
14	Liam Corcoran	(Republic of Ireland)	MF	March 4, 2002 (aged 19)	(Republic of Ireland) Colga	2021	
15	Carlton Ubaezuonu	(South Africa)	MF	April 22, 1998 (aged 23)	(Republic of Ireland) Longford Town	2020	
17	Caoilfhionn O’Dea	(Republic of Ireland)	MF	December 11, 2000 (aged 20)	(Republic of Ireland) Newmarket Celtic	2019	
22	Conor McCormack	(Republic of Ireland)	MF	May 18, 1990 (aged 32)	(Republic of Ireland) Derry City	2021	Captain
23	Ronan Manning	(Republic of Ireland)	MF	May 15, 2000 (aged 21)	(Republic of Ireland) Athlone Town	2021	
Forwards
7	Ruairí Keating	(Republic of Ireland)	FW	July 16, 1995 (aged 26)	(England) Gateshead	2021	
9	Pádraic Cunningham	(Republic of Ireland)	FW	November 13, 1996 (aged 24)	(Republic of Ireland) Corrib Celtic	2021	
14	Mikie Rowe	(Republic of Ireland)	FW	July 3, 1996 (aged 25)	(United States) Tormenta	2021	
18	Wilson Waweru	(Republic of Ireland)	FW	December 27, 2000 (aged 20)	(Republic of Ireland) Academy	2018	
19	Francely Lomboto	(Republic of Ireland)	FW	July 2, 2000 (aged 21)	(Republic of Ireland) Galway Hibernians	2020	
20	Mikey Place	(Republic of Ireland)	FW	April 9, 1998 (aged 23)	(Republic of Ireland) Finn Harps	2020	
24	Colin Kelly	(Republic of Ireland)	FW	November 22, 2001 (aged 19)	(Republic of Ireland) Bohemians	2021	
Players who departed before the end of the season
1	Kevin Horgan	(Republic of Ireland)	GK	April 26, 1997 (aged 24)	(Republic of Ireland) Shamrock Rovers	2019	
8	Shane Duggan	(Republic of Ireland)	MF	March 11, 1989 (aged 32)	(Republic of Ireland) Waterford	2020	
12	Stephen Christopher	(Republic of Ireland)	MF	July 11, 1996 (aged 24)	(Republic of Ireland) Cobh Ramblers	2019	
26	Michael Garrihy	(Republic of Ireland)	GK	May 17, 2001 (aged 20)	(Republic of Ireland) Limerick	2021	
27	Thomas Oluwa	(Republic of Ireland)	FW	February 6, 2001 (aged 20)	(Republic of Ireland) Bohemians	2021	

=== Transfers ===
==== In ====
Date	Position	Nationality	Name	Last club	Ref.
19 November 2020	FW	(Republic of Ireland)	Pádraic Cunningham	(Republic of Ireland) Corrib Celtic	
20 November 2020	MF	(Republic of Ireland)	David Hurley	(Republic of Ireland) Cobh Ramblers	
25 November 2020	FW	(Republic of Ireland)	Mikie Rowe	(United States) Tormenta	
30 November 2020	DF	(Republic of Ireland)	Gary Boylan	(Republic of Ireland) Cork City	
4 December 2020	FW	(Republic of Ireland)	Ruairí Keating	(England) Gateshead	
8 December 2020	DF	(Republic of Ireland)	Conor O'Keeffe	(Northern Ireland) Newry City	
9 December 2020	MF	(Republic of Ireland)	Ronan Manning	(Republic of Ireland) Athlone Town	
24 December 2020	FW	(Republic of Ireland)	Colin Kelly	(Republic of Ireland) Bohemians	
23 January 2021	GK	(Republic of Ireland)	Conor Kearns	(Republic of Ireland) St Patrick's Athletic	
10 March 2021	DF	(Republic of Ireland)	Stephen Walsh	(Republic of Ireland) Galway Hibernians	
30 January 2021	MF	(Republic of Ireland)	Conor McCormack	(Republic of Ireland) Derry City	
2 July 2021	DF	(Republic of Ireland)	Joe Gorman	(Republic of Ireland) Longford Town	
2 July 2021	DF	(Republic of Ireland)	Thomas Oluwa	(Republic of Ireland) Bohemians	
16 August 2021	DF	(Republic of Ireland)	Dean O'Shea	(Republic of Ireland) Bray Wanderers	

==== Out ====
Date	Position	Nationality	Name	To	Ref.
7 November 2020	MF	(Republic of Ireland)	Timmy Molloy	(Republic of Ireland) Salthill Devon	
7 November 2020	FW	(Republic of Ireland)	Enda Curran	(Republic of Ireland) Mervue United	
9 November 2020	FW	(Republic of Ireland)	Vinny Faherty	Retired	
9 November 2020	DF	(Republic of Ireland)	Kevin Farragher	(England) Eastbourne Town	
14 November 2020	DF	(United States)	Joshua Smith	Retired	
14 November 2020	DF	(Belgium)	Timo Parthoens	(Portugal) GS Loures	
13 December 2020	MF	(Republic of Ireland)	Donal Higgins	(Republic of Ireland) UCD	
17 December 2020	GK	(Republic of Ireland)	Micheál Schlingermann	(Republic of Ireland) Athlone Town	
19 December 2020	DF	(Republic of Ireland)	Marc Ludden	(Republic of Ireland) Treaty United	
19 December 2020	DF	(Republic of Ireland)	Jack Lynch	(Republic of Ireland) Treaty United	
19 December 2020	MF	(Republic of Ireland)	Conor Melody	(Republic of Ireland) Treaty United	
19 December 2020	DF	(Republic of Ireland)	Cian Murphy	(Republic of Ireland) Cobh Ramblers	
5 January 2021	MF	(Republic of Ireland)	Conor Barry	(Republic of Ireland) Finn Harps	
13 January 2021	GK	(Republic of Ireland)	Matthew Connor	(Republic of Ireland) Waterford	
14 January 2021	MF	(Republic of Ireland)	Sam Warde	(Northern Ireland) Portadown	
27 January 2021	MF	(Republic of Ireland)	Joe Collins	(Republic of Ireland) Treaty United	
2 February 2021	FW	(Republic of Ireland)	Dara Costelloe	(England) Burnley	
29 May 2021	GK	(Republic of Ireland)	Kevin Horgan		
10 July 2021	MF	(Republic of Ireland)	Stephen Christopher	(Republic of Ireland) Treaty United	
10 July 2021	GK	(Republic of Ireland)	Michael Garrihy	(United States) Tennessee Wesleyan Bulldogs	
10 August 2021	MF	(Republic of Ireland)	Shane Duggan	(Republic of Ireland) Fairview Rangers	
31 August 2021	FW	(Republic of Ireland)	Thomas Oluwa	(Northern Ireland) Larne	

==== Loan in ====
Date	Position	Nationality	Name	From	Date until	Ref.
7 July 2021	GK	(United States)	Luke Dennison	(Republic of Ireland) Longford Town	7 November 2021	

== Club ==
=== Coaching staff ===
- Manager: John Caulfield
- Assistant Manager: Colin Fortune
- First Team Coach: Lisa Fallon
- First Team Coach: Gary O'Connor
- Goalkeeping Coach: Gianluca Aimi
- Strength and Conditioning Coach: Danny Broderick
- Physiotherapist: Richard Grier
- Analyst: Robert Crosbie

== Competitions ==
=== League of Ireland First Division ===
==== League Table ====
Pos	Team	Pld	W	D	L	GF	GA	GD	Pts	Qualification
1	Shelbourne (C, P)	27	16	9	2	49	23	+26	57	Promotion to League of Ireland Premier Division
2	Galway United	27	15	6	6	39	25	+14	51	Qualification for Promotion play-offs
3	UCD (O, P)	27	13	7	7	55	38	+17	46	Qualification for Promotion play-offs
4	Treaty United	27	11	9	7	36	27	+9	42	Qualification for Promotion play-offs
5	Bray Wanderers	27	9	10	8	36	31	+5	37	Qualification for Promotion play-offs

Source: sseairtricityleague, Soccerway
Rules for classification: 1) Points; 2) Goal difference; 3) Goals scored
(C) Champions; (O) Play-off winners; (P) Promoted

==== Results summary ====
Overall								Home						Away					
Pld	W	D	L	GF	GA	GD	Pts	W	D	L	GF	GA	GD	W	D	L	GF	GA	GD
27	15	6	6	39	25	+14	51	8	4	2	22	12	+10	7	2	4	17	13	+4

==== Matches ====
Win Draw Loss

26 March 2021 1	Galway United	0–0	Shelbourne	Terryland, County Galway
19:45 GMT		Report	McAuley (red card) 41'	Stadium: Eamonn Deacy Park; Referee: Eoghan O'Shea

2 April 2021 2	Athlone Town	3–1	Galway United	Lissywollen, Athlone
19:45 GMT	Meaney 18', 26'	Report	Boylan 12' (o.g.); Waweru 77'	Stadium: Athlone Town Stadium; Referee: Michael Connolly

9 April 2021 3	Cabinteely	w/o	Galway United	Blackrock, Dublin 18
19:45 GMT		Report		Stadium: Stradbrook Road
Note: Cabinteely were unable to fulfill the fixture due to a positive Covid-19 case, as a result Galway United were awarded a 3–0 victory

16 April 2021 4	Galway United	0–1	Treaty United	Terryland, County Galway
19:45 GMT		Report	McCarthy 18'	Stadium: Eamonn Deacy Park; Referee: David Keeler

23 April 2021 5	Galway United	2–2	UCD	Terryland, County Galway
19:45 GMT	Keating 47'; Boylan 70' (o.g.); Cunningham 87'	Report	Whelan 45'	Stadium: Eamonn Deacy Park; Referee: David Keeler

1 May 2021 6	Cobh Ramblers	0–4	Galway United	Cobh, County Cork
19:00 GMT	Lyons (red card) 19'; Kavanagh 70' (o.g.)	Report	Keating 19', 71' (pen.); Cunningham 90' (pen.)	Stadium: St Colman's Park; Referee: Gavin Colfer

7 May 2021 7	Galway United	1–2	Bray Wanderers	Terryland, County Galway
19:45 GMT	Keating 34'	Report	Doyle 6'; Shaw 90'	Stadium: Eamonn Deacy Park; Referee: Mark Moynihan

14 May 2021 8	Galway United	1–0	Wexford	Terryland, County Galway
19:45 GMT	Hurley 90+5'	Report		Stadium: Eamonn Deacy Park; Referee: Robert Dowling

21 May 2021 9	Cork City	1–1	Galway United	Turners Cross, Cork
19:45 GMT	Baxter 81'	Report	Walsh (red card) 44'; Nugent 89'	Stadium: Turners Cross; Referee: Alan Carey

28 May 2021 10	Shelbourne	4–0	Galway United	Drumcondra, Dublin 3
19:45 GMT	O'Connor 25', 41'; Mahdy 51'; McAuley 81'	Report		Stadium: Tolka Park; Referee: Eoghan O'Shea

11 June 2021 11	Galway United	2–1	Athlone Town	Terryland, County Galway
19:45 GMT	Keating 75' (pen.); Cunningham 90+4'	Report	Barnes 24'	Stadium: Eamonn Deacy Park; Attendance: 100; Referee: Oliver Moran

18 June 2021 12	Galway United	1–0	Cabinteely	Terryland, County Galway
19:45 GMT	Waweru 37'	Report		Stadium: Eamonn Deacy Park; Attendance: 100; Referee: Mark Moynihan

25 June 2021 13	Treaty United	0–1	Galway United	Garryowen, Limerick
19:45 GMT		Report	Cunningham 48'	Stadium: Markets Field; Attendance: 100; Referee: Kevin O'Sullivan

2 July 2021 14	UCD	0–2	Galway United	Belfield, Dublin 4
19:45 GMT		Report	Keating 30'; Waweru 48'	Stadium: UCD Bowl; Referee: David Keeler

9 July 2021 15	Galway United	2–0	Cobh Ramblers	Terryland, County Galway
19:45 GMT	Keating 13' (pen.), 52'	Report		Stadium: Eamonn Deacy Park; Attendance: 200; Referee: Robert Dowling

16 July 2021 16	Bray Wanderers	0–0	Galway United	Bray, County Wicklow
19:45 GMT		Report		Stadium: Carlisle Grounds; Attendance: 150; Referee: Oliver Moran

30 July 2021 17	Wexford	1–3	Galway United	Crossabeg, County Wexford
19:45 GMT	Moylan 45'	Report	Cunningham 55'; Brouder 65'; Doherty 79'	Stadium: Ferrycarrig Park; Referee: Declan Toland

6 August 2021 18	Galway United	2–3	Cork City	Terryland, County Galway
19:45 GMT	Waweru 24'; Brouder 41'	Report	McGlade 15'; Crowley 26'; Kennedy 78'	Stadium: Eamonn Deacy Park; Attendance: 800; Referee: Michael Connolly

13 August 2021 19	Galway United	3–1	Shelbourne	Terryland, County Galway
19:45 GMT	Doherty 11'; Brouder 50'; Keating 89'	Report	McManus 90'	Stadium: Eamonn Deacy Park; Attendance: 800; Referee: Alan Patchell

20 August 2021 20	Athlone Town	1–0	Galway United	Lissywollen, Athlone
19:45 GMT	Byrne 63'	Report		Stadium: Athlone Town Stadium; Referee: Gavin Colfer

3 September 2021 21	Cabinteely	0–1	Galway United	Blackrock, Dublin 18
19:45 GMT	McPhillips (yellow card) 56' (yellow-red card) 66'	Report	Rowe 58'; Kearns (red card) 72'	Stadium: Stradbrook Road; Referee: Jason Mannix

10 September 2021 22	Galway United	0–0	Treaty United	Terryland, County Galway
19:45 GMT		Report	Ludden (yellow card) 46' (yellow-red card) 72'	Stadium: Eamonn Deacy Park; Attendance: 1,000; Referee: Kevin O’Sullivan

24 September 2021 23	Galway United	4–1	UCD	Terryland, County Galway
19:45 GMT	Waweru 39'; Rowe 67'; Doherty 75'; Cunningham 85'	Report	Keane 79'	Stadium: Eamonn Deacy Park; Attendance: 1,100; Referee: Oliver Moran

1 October 2021 24	Cobh Ramblers	0–1	Galway United	Cobh, County Cork
19:45 GMT	Madika (yellow card) 67' (yellow-red card) 87'; O'Connell (red card) 90+5'	Report	Keating 27' (penalty missed) 56'	Stadium: St Colman's Park; Referee: David Connolly

15 October 2021 25	Galway United	2–1	Wexford	Terryland, County Galway
19:45 GMT	Walsh 7'; Hurley 38'; Nugent (yellow card) 27' (yellow-red card) 52'	Report	Moylan 40'	Stadium: Eamonn Deacy Park; Attendance: 1,427; Referee: Eoghan O’Shea

22 October 2021 26	Galway United	1–0	Bray Wanderers	Terryland, County Galway
19:45 GMT	Waweru 82'	Report		Stadium: Eamonn Deacy Park; Attendance: 2,000; Referee: Ray Matthews
Note: Game was originally schedueled for 8 October

29 October 2021 27	Cork City	3–0	Galway United	Turners Cross, Cork
19:45 GMT	Häkkinen 29'; Byrne 62'; Coleman 72'	Report		Stadium: Turners Cross; Referee: Robert Dowling

==== Play-offs ====
===== Semi-finals =====
3 November 2021 First leg	Bray Wanderers	0–0	Galway United	Bray, County Wicklow
19:45 GMT		Report		Stadium: Carlisle Grounds; Referee: Gavin Colfer

7 November 2021 Second leg	Galway United	0–1 (0–1 agg.)	Bray Wanderers	Terryland, County Galway
19:45 GMT		Report	Kavanagh 22'	Stadium: Eamonn Deacy Park; Attendance: 3,700; Referee: Kevin O’Sullivan

=== FAI Cup ===
Win Draw Loss

==== First Round ====
23 July 2021 First Round	Shamrock Rovers	2–0	Galway United	Tallaght, Dublin 24
20:00 GMT	Gaffney 17'; Watts 21'	Report		Stadium: Tallaght Stadium; Attendance: 500; Referee: Rob Hennessy

=== Friendlies ===
Win Draw Loss

==== Pre-season Friendlies ====
21 February 2021	Galway United	1–0	Finn Harps	Terryland, County Galway
14:30 GMT	Lomboto 81'	Report		Stadium: Eamonn Deacy Park

3 March 2021	Galway United	1–1	Sligo Rovers	Terryland, County Galway
14:00 GMT	Cunningham 2'	Report	Kenny 71'	Stadium: Eamonn Deacy Park

12 March 2021	Galway United	1–2	Bohemians	Terryland, County Galway
19:30 GMT	Place 90'	Report	Burt 67'; Oluwa 69'	Stadium: Eamonn Deacy Park

19 March 2021	Wexford	0–4	Galway United	Crossabeg, County Wexford
18:30 GMT		Report	Kelly 3', 17'; Rowe 26'; Nugent 74'	Stadium: Ferrycarrig Park

== Statistics ==
=== Appearances and goals ===
This table shows all of the players who have featured in a first team squad for Galway United this season
Brackets denotes how many of the listed appearances were made as a substitute

No.	Pos.	Player	League		FAI Cup		Play-offs		Total	
No.	Pos.	Player	Apps	Goals	Apps	Goals	Apps	Goals	Apps	Goals
1	GK	(Republic of Ireland) Kevin Horgan	0	0	0	0	0	0	0	0
1	GK	(United States) Luke Dennison	4(1)	0	0	0	0	0	4	0
2	DF	(Republic of Ireland) Conor O'Keeffe	16	0	0	0	2	0	18	0
3	DF	(Republic of Ireland) Stephen Walsh	19(3)	1	1	0	2	0	22	1
4	DF	(Republic of Ireland) Gary Boylan	25(1)	0	1	0	2	0	28	0
5	DF	(Republic of Ireland) Killian Brouder	22(1)	3	0	0	1	0	23	3
6	DF	(Republic of Ireland) Maurice Nugent	22	1	1	0	2(1)	0	25	1
7	FW	(Republic of Ireland) Ruairí Keating	25(1)	9	1	0	2(1)	0	28	9
8	MF	(Republic of Ireland) Shane Duggan	11(2)	0	0	0	0	0	11	0
8	DF	(Republic of Ireland) Dean O'Shea	2(1)	0	0	0	0	0	2	0
9	FW	(Republic of Ireland) Pádraic Cunningham	24(17)	6	1(1)	0	2(2)	0	27	6
10	MF	(Republic of Ireland) David Hurley	22	2	0	0	2	0	24	2
11	MF	(United States) Shane Doherty	18(12)	3	0	0	2(2)	0	20	3
12	FW	(Republic of Ireland) Charlie Jones-Concannon	0	0	0	0	0	0	0	0
12	MF	(Republic of Ireland) Stephen Christopher	0	0	0	0	0	0	0	0
14	MF	(Republic of Ireland) Mikie Rowe	21(12)	2	1	0	2	0	24	2
15	MF	(South Africa) Carlton Ubaezuonu	8(2)	0	0	0	0	0	8	0
16	GK	(Republic of Ireland) Conor Kearns	23	0	1	0	2	0	26	0
17	MF	(Republic of Ireland) Caoilfhionn O’Dea	3(2)	0	1(1)	0	0	0	4	0
18	FW	(Republic of Ireland) Wilson Waweru	24(8)	8	1	0	2	0	27	8
19	FW	(Republic of Ireland) Francely Lomboto	0	0	0	0	0	0	0	0
20	FW	(Republic of Ireland) Mikey Place	21(9)	1	1	0	0	0	22	0
21	DF	(Republic of Ireland) Christopher Horgan	13(7)	0	1	0	0	0	14	0
22	MF	(Republic of Ireland) Conor McCormack	24	0	0	0	2	0	26	0
23	MF	(Republic of Ireland) Ronan Manning	2	0	0	0	0	0	2	0
24	FW	(Republic of Ireland) Colin Kelly	5(5)	0	1(1)	0	0	0	6	0
25	DF	(Republic of Ireland) Alex Murphy	10(1)	0	1	0	1(1)	0	12	0
26	GK	(Republic of Ireland) Michael Garrihy	0	0	0	0	0	0	0	0
27	FW	(Republic of Ireland) Thomas Oluwa	3(2)	0	1(1)	0	0	0	4	0
31	DF	(Republic of Ireland) Ethan Connolly	1(1)	0	0	0	0	0	1	0
32	DF	(Republic of Ireland) Joe Gorman	8(3)	0	1	0	2	0	11	0

=== Clean sheets ===
No.	Player	League	FAI Cup	Play-offs	Total		
No.	Player	1	(United States) Luke Dennison	2	0	0	2
16	(Republic of Ireland) Conor Kearns	11	0	1	12		

=== Disciplinary record ===
No.	Player	League			FAI Cup			Play-offs			Total		
No.	Player	Yellow card	(yellow card) (yellow-red card)	Red card	Yellow card	(yellow card) (yellow-red card)	Red card	Yellow card	(yellow card) (yellow-red card)	Red card	Yellow card	(yellow card) (yellow-red card)	Red card
22	Conor McCormack	7	0	0	0	0	0	0	0	0	7	0	0
3	Stephen Walsh	5	0	1	0	0	0	1	0	0	6	0	1
6	Maurice Nugent	5	1	0	0	0	0	0	0	0	5	1	0
4	Gary Boylan	5	0	0	0	0	0	0	0	0	5	0	0
7	Ruairí Keating	5	0	0	0	0	0	0	0	0	5	0	0
14	Mikie Rowe	5	0	0	0	0	0	0	0	0	5	0	0
10	David Hurley	4	0	0	0	0	0	0	0	0	4	0	0
15	Carlton Ubaezuonu	4	0	0	0	0	0	0	0	0	4	0	0
8	Shane Duggan	3	0	0	0	0	0	0	0	0	3	0	0
9	Pádraic Cunningham	3	0	0	0	0	0	1	0	0	3	0	0
18	Wilson Waweru	2	1	0	0	0	0	0	0	0	2	1	0
2	Conor O'Keeffe	1	0	0	0	0	0	1	0	0	2	0	0
5	Killian Brouder	2	0	0	0	0	0	0	0	0	2	0	0
16	Conor Kearns	1	1	0	0	0	0	0	0	0	1	1	0
20	Mikey Place	2	0	0	0	0	0	0	0	0	2	0	0
11	Shane Doherty	1	0	0	0	0	0	0	0	0	1	0	0
21	Christopher Horgan	1	0	0	0	0	0	0	0	0	1	0	0
25	Alex Murphy	0	0	0	1	0	0	0	0	0	1	0	0
32	Joe Gorman	1	0	0	0	0	0	0	0	0	1	0	0
Totals		57	3	1	1	0	0	3	0	0	61	3	1
