= 2024 FAI Cup =

Tournament details
- Country: Republic of Ireland
- Venue(s): Aviva Stadium, Dublin
- Dates: 17 May 2024 – 10 November 2024
- Teams: 40

Final positions
- Champions: Drogheda United
- Runners-up: Derry City

Tournament statistics
- Matches played: 39
- Goals scored: 137 (3.51 per match)
- Top goal scorer: Douglas James-Taylor (7 goals)

The 2024 FAI Cup, known as the Sports Direct FAI Cup for sponsorship reasons, was the 104th edition of the Republic of Ireland's primary national cup competition. It featured teams from the League of Ireland Premier Division and the First Division, as well as teams from the regional leagues of the Republic of Ireland football league system.

Drogheda United defeated Derry City in the final, winning their first FAI Cup since 2005. As winners, Drogheda United qualified for the second qualifying round of the 2025–26 UEFA Conference League.

St Patrick's Athletic were defending champions, but were eliminated by Derry City in the second round.

The competition format for this season was altered slightly, with no qualifying rounds. The preliminary round, traditionally held before the first round, was merged with the first round of the competition. This year the first round featured 20 clubs, comprising the last 16 teams from the 2023–24 FAI Intermediate Cup and the final four clubs from the 2023–24 FAI Junior Cup. Following the completion of the first round, League of Ireland clubs entered the competition in the second round.

== Teams ==
The 2024 FAI Cup is a knockout competition with 40 teams taking part. The competitors consist of the 20 teams from the League of Ireland and 20 teams from the regional leagues of the Republic of Ireland football league system.

| League of Ireland Premier Division | League of Ireland First Division | Leinster Senior League | Munster Senior League | Other leagues |
|---|---|---|---|---|
| Bohemians; Derry City; Drogheda United; Dundalk; Galway United; Shamrock Rovers; Shelbourne; Sligo Rovers; St Patrick's Athletic; Waterford | Athlone Town; Bray Wanderers; Cobh Ramblers; Cork City; Finn Harps; Kerry; Longford Town; Treaty United; UCD; Wexford | Ayrfield United; Ballyfermot United; Collinstown; Glebe North; Gorey Rangers; Kilbarrack United; Maynooth University Town; St. Francis; Wayside Celtic | Carrigaline United; Cobh Wanderers; College Corinthians; Leeds AFC; Midleton; Ringmahon Rangers; Rockmount; Wilton United | Cockhill Celtic (Inishowen Football League); Pike Rovers (Limerick & District League); Villa F.C. (Waterford & District League) |

== First round ==
The draw for the first round ties was made on 17 April and was made by former FAI Cup winner Stephen McGuiness and FAI President Paul Cooke. All ties were played the week ending 19 May. Teams receiving byes into the second round were: Carrigaline United, Ringmahon Rangers, Leeds and Kilbarrack United.

| 17 May 2024 | Wayside Celtic | 2–1 (a.e.t.) | Collinstown | Kilternan, County Dublin |
| 19:45 | Darragh O’Connor 102'; Dylan O’Connor 119' (pen.) | | McNeil 112' | Stadium: Jackson Park; Attendance: 78; Referee: Declan Troy |

| 18 May 2024 | Midleton | 3–0 | St. Francis | Midleton, County Cork |
| 14:00 | Murray-Duggan 82' (pen.); Kelly-Noonan 90+2'; Hegarty 90+5' | | | Stadium: Knockgriffin Park; Attendance: 52; Referee: Vincent Coonan |

| 18 May 2024 | Maynooth University Town | 1–4 | Gorey Rangers | Maynooth, County Kildare |
| 15:00 | Warfield 81' | | Greene 7'; Brennan 55'; Byrne-Murphy 71' 79' | Stadium: Rathcoffey Road; Attendance: 64; Referee: Liam McGuirk |

| 18 May 2024 | College Corinthians | 4–5 | Cobh Wanderers | Douglas, County Cork |
| 16:00 | Crowley 4' 34' 71'; Browne 55' | | Foster-O'Reilly 29'; Griffin 59' 67' (pen.) 81' 90+5' (pen.) | Stadium: Corinthians Park; Attendance: 180; Referee: Robert O'Leary |

| 19 May 2024 | Cockhill Celtic | 7–1 | Ayrfield United | Buncrana, County Donegal |
| 14:00 | Rudden 6' 64'; McColgan 18'; Mullen 62'; Bradley 85' 87' 90' | | Madden 67' (pen.) | Stadium: Charlie O'Donnell Sports Grounds; Attendance: 344; Referee: Thomas Oates |

| 19 May 2024 | Pike Rovers | 1–1 (a.e.t.) (3–1 p) | Villa F.C. | Limerick, County Limerick |
| 14:00 | Lipper 24' | | Walsh 76' | Stadium: Pike Rovers Complex; Attendance: 43; Referee: Brian Higgins |

| 19 May 2024 | Ballyfermot United | 3–0 | Rockmount | Clondalkin, County Dublin |
| 14:00 | Wasser 41'; Caffrey 56'; Nolan 90+3' | | | Stadium: Cloverhill Road; Attendance: 218; Referee: Owen Murphy |

| 19 May 2024 | Wilton United | 1–0 | Glebe North | Wilton, County Cork |
| 14:30 | McCarthy 22' | | | Stadium: Pat Bowdren Park; Attendance: 80; Referee: Simon Drislane |

== Second round ==
The draw for the second round took place on 6 June. Ties were played on the week ending 21 July.

| 19 July 2024 | Athlone Town | 1–0 | Ringmahon Rangers | Athlone, County Westmeath |
| 19:45 | Torre 47' | Report | | Stadium: Athlone Town Stadium; Attendance: 216; Referee: Alan Patchell |

| 19 July 2024 | Bohemians | 1–0 | Shamrock Rovers | Phibsborough, County Dublin |
| 19:45 | Rooney 69' (pen.) | Report | | Stadium: Dalymount Park; Attendance: 4,431; Referee: Rob Hennessy |

| 19 July 2024 | Cobh Ramblers | 0–2 | Kerry | Cobh, County Cork |
| 19:45 | O'Brien-Whitmarsh (red card) 61' | Report | Brosnan 9'; Kelliher 11' (pen.) | Stadium: St Colman's Park; Attendance: 456; Referee: Declan Toland |

| 19 July 2024 | Drogheda United | 2–1 | Dundalk | Drogheda, County Louth |
| 19:45 | Bolger 16'; Davis 74' | Report | Faulkner 90+2' | Stadium: Weavers Park; Attendance: 2,280; Referee: Damien MacGraith |

| 19 July 2024 | Galway United | 6–0 | Longford Town | Galway, County Galway |
| 19:45 | Lomboto 9'; Nugent 12'; Hickey 24'; Hurley 59'; Keohane 68'; Ogedi-Uzokwe 87' | Report | | Stadium: Eamonn Deacy Park; Attendance: 1,204; Referee: David Dunne |

| 19 July 2024 | Treaty United | 0–0 (a.e.t.) (4–1 p) | Kilbarrack United | Limerick, County Limerick |
| 19:45 | | Report | | Stadium: Markets Field; Attendance: 383; Referee: Daniel Murphy |
| | Penalties |
| | Curran (penalty scored); Lynch (penalty scored); Christopher (penalty scored); O'Reilly (penalty scored) | | Townley (penalty missed); McHugh (penalty missed); Fitzsimons (penalty scored) |

| 19 July 2024 | Waterford | 2–1 | Cockhill Celtic | Waterford, County Waterford |
| 19:45 | Arubi 21'; Burke 47' | Report | Rudden 13' | Stadium: RSC; Attendance: 1,487; Referee: Marc Lynch |

| 19 July 2024 | Wilton United | 2–1 | Carrigaline United | Carrigaline, County Cork |
| 19:45 | McCarthy 32'; Olajitan 56' | Report | Walker 36' | Stadium: Ballea Park; Attendance: 110; Referee: Lucas Keating |

| 20 July 2024 | Pike Rovers | 3–1 | Midleton | Limerick, County Limerick |
| 15:00 | Murphy 39'; Walsh 72'; Clarke 79' | Report | Kelly-Noonan 71' | Stadium: Pike Rovers Complex; Attendance: 95; Referee: Aaron O'Dowd |

| 20 July 2024 | Cork City | 1–0 | Finn Harps | Turners Cross, County Cork |
| 17:00 | Dijksteel 39' | Report | | Stadium: Turners Cross; Attendance: 1,359; Referee: Gavin Colfer |

| 21 July 2024 | Ballyfermot United | 3–1 | Leeds AFC | Clondalkin, County Dublin |
| 14:00 | Nolan 42' (pen.); Henderson 67'; J.Kelly 74' (pen.) | | E.Murphy 15' | Stadium: Coldcut; Attendance: 330; Referee: Ryan Maher |

| 21 July 2024 | Gorey Rangers | 0–4 | UCD | Gorey, County Wexford |
| 14:00 | | Report | Doyle 32'; Behan 60'; Norval 84'; Ragget 90+1' | Stadium: Altura Credit Union Park; Attendance: 150; Referee: Oliver Moran |

| 21 July 2024 | Bray Wanderers | 0–1 | Shelbourne | Bray, County Wicklow |
| 15:00 | | Report | Boyd 9' | Stadium: Carlisle Grounds; Attendance: 2,339; Referee: Paul Norton |

| 21 July 2024 | Wayside Celtic | 1–3 | Wexford | Kilternan, County Dublin |
| 15:00 | O'Connor 52' | Report | Rowe 11'; Dobbs 50'; Curtis 87' | Stadium: Jackson Park; Attendance: 290; Referee: Jason Moore |

| 21 July 2024 | Derry City | 3–0 | St Patrick's Athletic | Derry |
| 18:00 | Grivosti 52' (o.g.); Mullen 58'; Duffy 67' | Report | | Stadium: Ryan McBride Brandywell Stadium; Attendance: 2,190; Referee: Rob Harvey |

| 21 July 2024 | Sligo Rovers | 3–0 | Cobh Wanderers | Sligo, County Sligo |
| 18:00 | Waweru 16' 75' 90+4' (pen.) | Report | | Stadium: The Showgrounds; Attendance: 1,332; Referee: Eoghan O'Shea |

== Third round ==
The draw for the third round of the FAI Cup took place on 23 July. Ties were played on the weekend of 18 August.

| 16 August 2024 | Ballyfermot United | 0–3 | Wexford | Clondalkin, County Dublin |
| 19:45 | | | Curtis 33', 58'; Oluwa 82' | Stadium: Coldcut; Attendance: 392; Referee: Declan Toland |

| 16 August 2024 | Cork City | 0–1 | Derry City | Turners Cross, County Cork |
| 19:45 | | Report | Todd 72' | Stadium: Turners Cross; Attendance: 3,169; Referee: Marc Lynch |

| 16 August 2024 | Drogheda United | 9–0 | Wilton United | Drogheda, County Louth |
| 19:45 | James-Taylor 9' 14' 21'; Brennan 31'; Pierrot 47'; Quinn 51'; Bosakani 73' 84' 89' | Report | | Stadium: Weavers Park; Attendance: 953; Referee: Eoghan O'Shea |

| 16 August 2024 | Shelbourne | 1–1 (a.e.t.) (5–3 p) | Galway United | Drumcondra, County Dublin |
| 19:45 | O'Brien 94' | Report | Keohane 116' | Stadium: Tolka Park; Attendance: 1,639; Referee: Robert Harvey |
| | Penalties |
| | O'Brien (penalty scored); Lunney (penalty scored); Coyle (penalty scored); Coote (penalty scored); Burt (penalty scored) | | Hurley (penalty scored); Keohane (penalty scored); Clarke (penalty scored); Buckley (penalty missed) |

| 16 August 2024 | Treaty United | 7–0 | Pike Rovers | Limerick, County Limerick |
| 19:45 | Molloy 2', 37', 47'; Curran 5' (pen.); Vrljičak 41', 52'; R.Lynch 77' | Report | | Stadium: Markets Field; Attendance: 1,838; Referee: Paul Norton |

| 16 August 2024 | Waterford | 2–3 (a.e.t.) | Athlone Town | Waterford, County Waterford |
| 19:45 | Amond 41' (pen.), 105' | Report | Ebbe 77'; Connolly 116'; McGregor 120+1' | Stadium: RSC; Attendance: 1,545; Referee: David Dunne |

| 17 August 2024 | Sligo Rovers | 0–2 | UCD | Sligo, County Sligo |
| 19:45 | | Report | O'Regan 78'; Wells 82' | Stadium: The Showgrounds; Attendance: 1,862; Referee: Damien MacGraith |

| 18 August 2024 | Kerry | 2–2 (a.e.t.) (2–4 p) | Bohemians | Tralee, County Kerry |
| 16:00 | Kelliher 43', 52' | Report | Clarke 22'; Greive 44' | Stadium: Mounthawk Park; Attendance: 1,110; Referee: Neil Doyle |
| | Penalties |
| | Brosnan (penalty scored); Amechi (penalty missed); Barrett (penalty missed); Crowe (penalty scored) | | Tierney (penalty scored); Devoy (penalty scored); Grant (penalty scored); McDaid (penalty scored) |

== Quarter-finals ==
The draw for the quarter-finals took place on 20 August 2024. The draw was made by Republic of Ireland manager Heimir Hallgrímsson. Ties were played on the weekend of 15 September.

| 13 September 2024 | UCD | 0–4 | Bohemians | Dún Laoghaire–Rathdown, Dublin |
| 19:45 | | Report | Tierney 34', 54'; Greive 89'; Miller 90+3' | Stadium: UCD Bowl; Attendance: 2,233; Referee: Damien MacGraith |

| 13 September 2024 | Athlone Town | 1–4 | Drogheda United | Lissywollen, Athlone |
| 19:45 | Ebbe 85' (pen.) | Report | James-Taylor 12', 52'; Brennan 65'; Foley 81' | Stadium: Athlone Town Stadium; Attendance: 1,132; Referee: Paul Norton |

| 13 September 2024 | Wexford | 4–1 | Treaty United | Crossabeg, County Wexford |
| 19:45 | Isamala 9', 27'; Oluwa 11' (pen.), 45+4' | Report | Vrljicak 90+1' | Stadium: Ferrycarrig Park; Attendance: 1,063; Referee: Gavin Colfer |

| 14 September 2024 | Derry City | 2–0 | Shelbourne | Derry, Northern Ireland |
| 17:45 | Duffy 23'; Mullen 64' | Report | | Stadium: Brandywell Stadium; Attendance: 3,150; Referee: Rob Harvey |
Note: Game shown live on RTE 2 television

== Semi-finals ==
The draw for the semi-finals was made on 14 September live on RTE2 following a televised game. Ties were played on the weekend of 6 October.

| 4 October 2024 | Bohemians | 0–2 | Derry City | Phibsborough, Dublin |
| 19:45 | | Report | Duffy 40', 72' | Stadium: Dalymount Park; Attendance: 4,430; Referee: Paul McLaughlin |
Note: Game shown live on RTÉ2 Television

| 6 October 2024 | Drogheda United | 3–2 | Wexford | Drogheda, County Louth |
| 14:50 | Foley 65', 90+2'; James-Taylor 77' | Report | Dobbs 42', 79' | Stadium: Weavers Park; Attendance: 2,543; Referee: Damien MacGraith |
Note: Game shown live on RTÉ2 Television

== Final ==
The final was held on 10 November 2024 at the Aviva Stadium in Dublin.

| 10 November 2024 | Drogheda United | 2–0 | Derry City | Dublin |
| 15:00 | Quinn 37'; James-Taylor 58' (pen.) | Report | | Stadium: Aviva Stadium; Attendance: 38,723; Referee: Rob Harvey |
