= List of Galway United F.C. seasons =

This is a list of seasons played by Galway United F.C. in the League of Ireland. It details the club's achievements in major competitions, along with top league scorers for each season.

== Seasons ==
Season	League (Note: 2 points were awarded for a win and 1 point for a draw up to and including the 1992/93 season, apart from the 1981/82 season in which 4 points were awarded for an away win, 3 points for a home win, 2 points for an away draw and 1 point for a home draw. From the 1993/94 season 3 points were awarded for a win and 1 point for a draw.)									FAI Cup	League Cup	Top League Goalscorer	
Season	Division	P	W	D	L	F	A	Pts	Pos	FAI Cup	League Cup	Name	Goals
1977-78	LOI (Note: The League of Ireland contained only one tier until the 1984/85 season.)	30	3	10	17	16	53	16	15th	R2	GR	Paul Martin / Tom Lally	4
1978-79	LOI	30	4	5	21	41	79	13	15th	R2	R1	Des Kennedy	9
1979-80	LOI	30	11	6	13	32	47	28	11th	R2	R1	Kevin Cassidy / Tony Collins	7
1980-81	LOI	30	6	9	15	26	39	21	13th	R1	RU	Carl Humphries / Micky McLaughlin	5
1981-82	LOI	30	5	8	17	30	62	29	15th	R2	R1	Brian Duff	8
1982-83	LOI	26	6	8	12	33	44	20	11th	R1	GR	Kevin Cassidy	13
1983-84	LOI	26	6	9	11	26	33	21	12th	R2	SF	Brian Duff	9
1984-85	LOI	30	9	11	10	49	43	29	6th	RU	GR	Brian Gardner	10
1985-86	Prem	22	12	7	3	42	19	31	2nd	R4	W	Paul McGee	13
1986-87	Prem	22	8	6	8	25	25	22	6th	QF	QF	Paul McGee	6
1987-88	Prem	33	15	10	8	48	34	40	5th	R4	QF	Paul McGee	20
1988-89	Prem	33	8	9	16	34	56	25	10th	R1	GR	Paul McGee	11
1989-90	Prem	33	10	9	14	39	61	29	8th	QF	QF	Paul McGee	15
1990-91	Prem	33	9	5	19	34	61	23	8th	W	QF	Tommy Keane	8
1991-92	Prem ↓	33	7	8	18	37	58	22	12th	R2	QF	Noel Mernagh	9
1992-93	First ↑	27	16	6	5	56	27	38	1st	R1	GR	John Brennan	14
1993-94	Prem	32	14	8	10	47	42	50	3rd	R1	R1	John Brennan	14
1994-95	Prem	33	10	9	14	39	53	39	9th	R2	GR	Ricky O'Flaherty	13
1995-96	Prem ↓	33	5	6	22	26	67	21	12th	R1	GR	John Brennan	7
1996-97	First	27	9	8	10	33	38	35	6th	R1	W	Fergal Coleman	7
1997-98	First	27	13	4	10	38	29	43	4th	R2	R2	Fergal Coleman	13
1998-99	First ↑	36	16	16	4	53	34	64	2nd	SF	SF	Billy Clery	12
1999-00	Prem	33	8	10	15	32	49	34	9th	SF	R1	Billy Clery / Eric Lavine	6
2000-01	Prem	33	10	10	13	34	47	40	9th	R1	GR	Eric Lavine	10
2001-02	Prem ↓	33	5	4	24	28	73	19	11th	R1	R1	Alan Murphy	11
2002-03	First	22	10	6	6	34	21	36	3rd	R2	(Note: No Competition due to change in seasons)	Alan Murphy	12
2003	First	33	10	13	10	48	53	43	7th	R2	GR	Alan Murphy	21
2004	First	33	14	10	9	55	49	52	5th	R2	GR	Barry Moran / Damien Dupuy	13
2005	First	36	14	11	11	46	43	53	5th	R2	R2	Barry Moran	11
2006	First ↑	36	19	12	5	57	25	69	3rd	R2	R1	Barry Moran	11
2007	Prem	33	7	13	13	28	35	35	8th	R2	R2	Derek Glynn	10
2008	Prem	33	8	8	17	34	49	32	9th	SF	SF	Jay O'Shea	7
2009	Prem	36	12	6	18	36	57	42	7th	R4	QF	Vinny Faherty	8
2010	Prem	36	9	11	16	38	59	38	8th	QF	R1	Karl Sheppard / Anthony Flood	9
2011	Prem ↓	36	1	3	32	20	115	6	10th	R3	R1	Alan Murphy	5
2012
2013
2014	First ↑ (Note: As Galway F.C.)	28	13	10	5	47	23	49	3rd	R3	QF	Jake Keegan	14
2015	Prem	33	9	4	20	39	61	31	10th	R3	RU	Enda Curran	12
2016	Prem	33	10	8	15	44	54	38	9th	R2	QF	Vinny Faherty	12
2017	Prem ↓	33	7	14	12	45	50	35	10th	QF	SF	Ronan Murray	13
2018	First	27	10	7	10	41	36	37	6th	R2	R2	Conor Barry	10
2019	First	27	7	5	15	36	42	26	7th	QF	R2	Vinny Faherty	6
2020	First (Note: Truncated season due to Covid-19)	18	7	6	5	26	19	27	5th	R2	-	Carlton Ubaezuonu	4
2021	First	27	15	6	6	39	25	51	2nd	R1	-	Ruairí Keating	9
2022	First	32	17	9	6	56	29	60	3rd	R2	-	Stephen Walsh	16
2023	First ↑	36	30	4	2	98	18	94	1st	SF	-	David Hurley	21
2024	Prem	36	13	13	10	33	29	52	5th	R3	-	Stephen Walsh	9
2025	Prem	36	9	12	15	37	44	39	8th	QF	-	Moses Dyer	10
2026	Prem	36	10	10	16	46	53	42	8th	SF	-	Kris Twardek	8
2027	Prem	0	0	0	0	0	0	0	TBD	TBD	-	-	-

== Key ==
- P = Played
- W = Games won
- D = Games drawn
- L = Games lost
- F = Goals for
- A = Goals against
- Pts = Points
- Pos = Final position
- First = League of Ireland First Division
- Prem = League of Ireland Premier Division
- F = Final
- RU = Runner Up
- SF = Semi-finals
- QF = Quarter-finals
- GR = Regional Group Stage
- R1 = Round 1
- R2 = Round 2
- R3 = Round 3
- R4 = Round 4

Champions	Runners-up	Promoted	Relegated
