= 2023 FAI Cup =

Tournament details
- Country: Republic of Ireland
- Venue(s): Aviva Stadium, Dublin
- Dates: 7 April – 12 November
- Teams: 40 (all); 20 (qualifying round); 32 (main competition)

Final positions
- Champions: St Patrick's Athletic
- Runners-up: Bohemians

Tournament statistics
- Top goal scorer: Jonathan Afolabi (4 goals)
- (Note: All statistics do not include qualifying round)

The 2023 FAI Cup, known as the Sports Direct FAI Cup for sponsorship reasons, was the 103rd edition of the Republic of Ireland's primary national cup competition. It featured teams from the League of Ireland Premier Division and the First Division, as well as non-league teams. The competition began with qualifying on 7 April 2023 and concluded with the final on 12 November 2023 in the Aviva Stadium. The winners qualified for the second qualifying round of the 2024–25 UEFA Conference League.

St Patrick's Athletic won the cup on 12 November after a 3–1 win over Bohemians in the final, it was their fifth FAI Cup win.

== Teams ==
The 2023 FAI Cup is a knockout competition with 40 teams taking part. The competitors consist of the 20 teams from the League of Ireland and 20 teams from the regional leagues of the Republic of Ireland football league system.

League of Ireland Premier Division	League of Ireland First Division	Leinster Senior League	Munster Senior League	Ulster Senior League	Other leagues
Bohemians; Cork City; Derry City; Drogheda United; Dundalk; St Patrick's Athletic; Shamrock Rovers; Shelbourne; Sligo Rovers; UCD	Athlone Town; Bray Wanderers; Cobh Ramblers; Finn Harps; Galway United; Kerry; Longford Town; Treaty United; Waterford; Wexford	Bangor Celtic; Drumcondra; Gorey Rangers; Home Farm; Kilbarrack United; Killester Donnycarney; Lucan United; Portlaoise; Skerries Town; St Mochta's; St Patrick's CY; Usher Celtic; Willow Park	Avondale United; Ringmahon Rangers; Rockmount	Cockhill Celtic	Ballynanty Rovers; (Limerick & District League): St Michael's; (Tipperary South District League): Newmarket Celtic; (Clare District League)

== Preliminary round ==
The eight preliminary round ties began over the weekend of the 9th of April with the first round proper played in July. The four non-league teams receiving byes into the first round were; Lucan United, Gorey Rangers, Avondale United and Bangor Celtic.

7 April 2023	St. Patrick's CY	4–0	Willow Park	Irishtown
19:30	Gregg 4'; Kinsella 18'; Daly 68' 85'			Stadium: Irishtown Stadium; Attendance: 50; Referee: Robert Redmond

7 April 2023	Portlaoise	2–1	Usher Celtic	Portlaoise
19:45	Fitzpatrick 13' 29'		Buckley 9'; Lynam (red card) 70'	Stadium: Rossleighan Park; Attendance: 150; Referee: David Gallagher

8 April 2023	Cockhill Celtic	5–4 (a.e.t.)	St. Mochta's	Buncrana
13:00	McLaughlin 64' 75' 89'; Friel 104' 120+1'		Brady 31'; Donnelly 41'; Scott 64' 117'; McWilliams (red card) 61'	Stadium: Charlie O'Donnell Sports Grounds; Attendance: 150; Referee: Barry Maxwell

8 April 2023	Kilbarrack United	5–0	Drumcondra	Raheny
14:00	Townley 5'; McCourt 8'; Fitzsimons 39'; Cummins 54'; Mulligan 82'			Stadium: Greendale Astro; Attendance: 100; Referee: Liam McGuirk

8 April 2023	Ringmahon Rangers	1–0	Killester Donnycarney	Mahon
14:00	Horgan 78'		Kavanagh (red card) 80'	Stadium: Ringmahon Park; Attendance: 100; Referee: Edwin McNally

9 April 2023	Skerries Town	4–0	Newmarket Celtic	Skerries
14:00	Leonard 10'; Young 23' 68'; McKenna 51' (pen.)			Stadium: Park Lane; Attendance: 250; Referee: John McCarthy

9 April 2023	Home Farm	0–0 (a.e.t.) (1–4 p)	Rockmount	Whitehall
14:00				Stadium: Whitehall Stadium; Attendance: 115; Referee: Declan Troy
	Penalties
	Mellah (red card) 56'; McNevin (penalty missed); Hoban (penalty missed); Prizeman (penalty scored)		Ahearne (penalty scored); Casey (penalty scored); Leonard (penalty scored); Connolly (penalty scored)

9 April 2023	St. Michael's	2–1	Ballynanty Rovers	Tipperary
15:00	McGrath 30'; Byron 61'		Quinn 66'	Stadium: Cooke Park; Attendance: 550; Referee: Alec McCormack

== First round ==
The draw for the first round was made on June 6 and was made by FAI President Gerry McAnaney and former FAI Cup winner Derek Coughlan. All ties took place on the weekend of 23 July.

21 July 2023	UCD	3–2	Cobh Ramblers	Belfield
19:45	Keaney 23'; Frahill 50' (o.g.); Norris 62'	Report	Holland 16'; Larkin 70'	Stadium: UCD Bowl; Attendance: 174; Referee: Declan Toland

21 July 2023	Kerry	2–0	Ringmahon Rangers	Tralee
19:45	Kelliher 75', 84'	Report		Stadium: Mounthawk Park; Attendance: 665; Referee: Marc Lynch

21 July 2023	Drogheda United	2–1	Sligo Rovers	Drogheda
19:45	Foley 57'; Brennan 80' (pen.)	Report	Mata 42' (pen.); Lafferty (red card) 78'	Stadium: Weaver's Park; Attendance: 1334; Referee: David Dunne

21 July 2023	Bohemians	1–0	Shelbourne	Phibsborough
19:45	Afolabi 32'	Report		Stadium: Dalymount Park; Attendance: 4168; Referee: Paul McLaughlin

21 July 2023	Kilbarrack United	0–1	Finn Harps	Kilbarrack
19:45		Report	Hutchison 23'	Stadium: Greendale Road; Attendance: 375; Referee: Kevin O’Sullivan

21 July 2023	Wexford	3–0	Avondale United	Wexford
19:45	Boyle 45' (pen.); Doran 63'; Kenny 90+5' (pen.)	Report		Stadium: Ferrycarrig Park; Attendance: 268; Referee: Gavin Colfer

22 July 2023	Treaty United	0–2	Cork City	Garyowen
14:00	Nwankwo (red card) 90'	Report	Honohan 54'; Owalabi 77'	Stadium: Markets Field; Attendance: 909; Referee: Damien MacGraith

22 July 2023	Cockhill Celtic	1–3	Bray Wanderers	Buncrana
14:00	McClure 42'	Report	Feeney 25'; Lyons 34'; Thompson 36'	Stadium: Charlie O'Donnell Sports Grounds; Attendance: 200; Referee: Paul Norton

22 July 2023	Gorey Rangers	1–2	Rockmount	Gorey
15:00	Molloy 90+4'	Report	O'Sullivan 42'; Courtney 76'	Stadium: Ramstown; Attendance: 177; Referee: Daniel Murphy

22 July 2023	St Michael's	0–5	Waterford	Tipperary
17:00		Report	Coughlan 1'; Perry 26'; Parsons 42'; Cresswell 67'; Akachukwu 72'	Stadium: Cooke Park; Attendance: 800; Referee: Ray Matthews

22 July 2023	Galway United	4–1	Bangor Celtic	Galway
17:00	Aouachria 14'; Walsh 39', 45+4'; Brouder 52'	Report	Maher 1'	Stadium: Eamonn Deacy Park; Attendance: 400; Referee: Alan Patchell

23 July 2023	Lucan United	2–3	St Patrick's CY	Celbridge
11:00	Mooney 36' 89'	Report	Doyle 9'; Hanrahan 39'; Ivie 90'	Stadium: O'Hanlon Park; Attendance: 200; Referee: David Gallagher

23 July 2023	Portlaoise	0–3	Skerries Town	Portlaoise
14:00		Report	McKenna 14', 55', 90'	Stadium: Rossleighan Park; Attendance: 675; Referee: Sean Boyd

23 July 2023	Derry City	3–0	Athlone Town	Derry
17:00	Patching 23' (pen.); B.Kavanagh 90+3'; Duffy 90+5'	Report		Stadium: Brandywell Stadium; Attendance: 3100; Referee: Oliver Moran

23 July 2023	Dundalk	1–0	Shamrock Rovers	Dundalk
17:00	Hayden Muller 23'; Doyle (red card) 31'	Report		Stadium: Oriel Park; Attendance: 2686; Referee: Rob Harvey

23 July 2023	Longford Town	1–2	St Patrick's Athletic	Longford
18:00	Boudiaf 78'; Hand (red card) 81'; Brady (red card) 91'	Report	Murphy 64'; Forrester 80' (pen.)	Stadium: Bishopsgate; Attendance: 1164; Referee: Rob Hennessy

== Second round ==
The draw for the second round was made on 25 July and was broadcast live on RTE 2FM on the 'Game On' radio programme. All ties took place on the weekend of 20 August.

18 August 2023	Bohemians	6–0	Rockmount	Phibsborough
19:45	Clarke 18' 45+1'; Afolabi 23'; McDaid 55'; Twardek 66'; McDonnell 85'	Report		Stadium: Dalymount Park; Attendance: 2,746; Referee: David Dunne

18 August 2023	Bray Wanderers	0–1	Dundalk	Bray
19:45		Report	Horgan 86'	Stadium: Carlisle Grounds; Attendance: 500; Referee: Rob Hennessy

18 August 2023	Kerry	0–1	Drogheda United	Tralee
19:45		Report	Robinson 7'	Stadium: Mounthawk Park; Attendance: 960; Referee: Kevin O'Sullivan

18 August 2023	Finn Harps	5–0	Skerries Town	Ballybofey
20:00	Hutchison 4'; Flood 16' 58'; Ferry 47'; O'Donnell 55'	Report		Stadium: Finn Park; Attendance: 828; Referee: Damien MacGraith

20 August 2023	St. Patrick's CY	0–1	Wexford	Ringsend
13:30		Report	D Levingston 42'	Stadium: Irishtown Stadium; Attendance: 500; Referee: Adriano Reale

20 August 2023	Derry City	0–0 (a.e.t.) (3–4 p)	St Patrick's Athletic	Derry
17:00		Report		Stadium: Brandywell Stadium; Attendance: 3,267; Referee: Neil Doyle
	Penalties
	P.McEleney (penalty scored); B.Kavanagh (penalty scored); Mullen (penalty scored); Duffy (penalty missed); Connolly (penalty missed)		Forrester (penalty scored); Nolan (penalty scored); Mulraney (penalty missed); Leavy (penalty scored); Melia (penalty scored)

21 August 2023	Cork City	3–0	Waterford	Cork
19:45	Keating 1'; Honohan 17'; Bargary 87'	Report	Idowu (red card) 90'	Stadium: Turners Cross; Attendance: 2,407; Referee: Eoghan O'Shea

21 August 2023	UCD	1–5	Galway United	Belfield
19:45	O'Reilly 86' (o.g.)	Report	Aouachria 5'; Hurley 15', 38'; Manning 45+1'; Manley 69'	Stadium: UCD Bowl; Attendance: 416; Referee: Rob Harvey
Note: Original fixture on 18 August abandoned at half time due to Storm Betty.

== Quarter-finals ==
The draw for the quarter-finals of the FAI Cup was hosted by Shane Dawson and was made on 22 August 2023. FAI President Gerry McAnaney and former two time FAI Cup winner Barry Ferguson made the draw. Games were played on 15 September 2023.

15 September 2023	Drogheda United	1–3	Bohemians	Drogheda
19:45	Brennan 50' (pen.)	Report	Nowak 44'; Afolabi 56' 90' (pen.)	Stadium: Weavers Park; Attendance: 2,344; Referee: Damien MacGraith

15 September 2023	Finn Harps	1–2	St Patrick's Athletic	Ballybofey
20:00	O'Donnell 24'	Report	Forrester 48' (pen.); Lonergan 85'	Stadium: Finn Park; Attendance: 1,351; Referee: Rob Harvey

15 September 2023	Galway United	4–0	Dundalk	Galway
19:45	Walsh 8'; McCarthy 20'; Nugent 30'; Hurley 39' (pen.)	Report		Stadium: Eamonn Deacy Park; Attendance: 4,300; Referee: David Dunne

15 September 2023	Cork City	2–1	Wexford	Cork
19:45	Dijksteel 78'; Keating 90+2'	Report	Dobbs 45+2'	Stadium: Turners Cross; Attendance: 2,141; Referee: Eoghan O'Shea

== Semi-finals ==
The draw for the semi finals was made on 19 September and was hosted by Shane Dawson at FAI Headquarters in Abbotstown. The draw was made by FAI President Gerry McAnaney and for FAI Cup winner Shane Robinson.

7 October 2023	Galway United	0–1	Bohemians	Galway
14:40		Report	Connolly 44'; Radkowski (red card) 59'	Stadium: Eamonn Deacy Park; Attendance: 4,300; Referee: Neil Doyle

8 October 2023	Cork City	0–2	St Patrick's Athletic	Cork
14:40		Report	Doyle 12'; Carty 83'	Stadium: Turners Cross; Attendance: 6,355; Referee: Rob Harvey

== Final ==
The final was held on 12 November 2023 in the Aviva Stadium.

12 November 2023	Bohemians	1–3	St Patrick's Athletic	Ballsbridge
15:00	Afolabi 9' (pen.)	Report	Doyle 23'; Nowak 48' (o.g.); Lonergan 87'	Stadium: Aviva Stadium; Attendance: 43,881; Referee: Paul McLaughlin
