= Rob Slevin =

Irish professional footballer

Personal information
- Full name: Robert Slevin
- Date of birth: 14 July 1998 (age 28)
- Place of birth: Carrigaline, County Cork, Ireland
- Height: 6 ft 2 in (1.88 m)
- Position: Defender

Team information
- Current team: Coleraine (on loan from Derry City)

Youth career
- Carrigaline United
- Cobh Ramblers

Senior career*
Years	Team	Apps	(Gls)
2017–2019	UCC		
2019	Waterford	12	(0)
2020–2021	Cork City	6	(0)
2022	Finn Harps	30	(0)
2023–2025	Galway United	97	(8)
2026–	Derry City	8	(1)
2026–	→ Coleraine (loan)	0	(0)
- * Club domestic league appearances and goals as of 22:30, 14 December 2025 (UTC)

Rob Slevin (born 14 July 1998) is an Irish professional footballer who plays as a defender for NIFL Premiership side Coleraine on loan from League of Ireland Premier Division club Derry City. A left-sided centre-back who can also play at left-back, he has previously played in the League of Ireland for Waterford, Cork City, Finn Harps and Galway United, having begun his senior career with University College Cork in the Munster Senior League.

== Club career ==
=== Early life and UCC ===
Slevin grew up in Carrigaline, County Cork, and joined local club Carrigaline United at the age of six, playing there throughout his youth. He later spent time with Cobh Ramblers at under-17 level before moving into senior football with UCC in the Munster Senior League.

While studying for a commerce degree at UCC, Slevin captained the university side throughout a period of success. He scored the winning goal during a man-of-the-match display in the 2019 Collingwood Cup final and was named player of the tournament. In May 2019 he completed the double as UCC won the Munster Senior League Premier Division. He was nominated for the FAI Intermediate Player of the Year award and was later named FAI Colleges and Universities International Player of the Year for 2019.

=== Waterford ===
In June 2019, Slevin signed his first professional contract, joining League of Ireland Premier Division club Waterford until the end of the season. He made his debut for the club in a league match against Bohemians on 28 June 2019. He went on to make 15 league appearances in total as the club finished 6th in the league, also appearing twice in the Scottish Challenge Cup and once in the League Cup.

=== Cork City ===
In January 2020, Slevin returned to his native city to sign for fellow Premier Division side Cork City under Neale Fenn. At the time of the move he was entering the final year of his commerce degree at UCC and combined his studies with top-flight football.

He made six league appearances during the pandemic-affected 2020 campaign as the club were relegated to the First Division. A serious back injury suffered early in 2021 required surgery and ruled him out for the entire season. He was released by Cork City at the end of the 2021 campaign.

=== Finn Harps ===
Ahead of the 2022 season, Slevin returned to Premier Division football by signing for Finn Harps. Finn Harps manager Ollie Horgan travelled to Carrigaline during the off-season to persuade him to join the club, with Slevin later recalling that he "nearly took his hand off" for the chance to return to the top flight.

Slevin established himself as a regular in the Finn Harps defence during the 2022 Premier Division season. He made 30 league appearances and one FAI Cup appearance in that campaign. Despite his performances, Finn Harps were relegated at the end of the season.

=== Galway United ===
In November 2022, Slevin signed for League of Ireland First Division club Galway United. He formed a central defensive partnership with Killian Brouder and also filled in at left-back when required.

Slevin played in 37 of Galway's 40 league and cup games in 2023 as the club won the First Division title, their first major trophy in 27 years, and secured promotion back to the Premier Division. He scored five league goals and helped the team keep 17 league clean sheets; his performances earned him a place in the PFAI First Division Team of the Year.

He remained a key part of Galway United's defence on their return to the Premier Division in 2024. Slevin made 29 appearances in all competitions, scoring twice and providing one assist, as the club finished the season with the second-best defensive record in the division, conceding only 29 goals in 36 league matches. Galway re-signed him on successive one-year contracts in December 2023 and November 2024, taking him into his third season with the club in 2025. By the end of the 2025 season he had made over 100 appearances for Galway in all competitions.

=== Derry City ===
On 1 December 2025, Slevin signed a three-year contract with Derry City ahead of the 2026 Premier Division season.

==== Coleraine (loan) ====
On 3 August 2026, Slevin signed on loan for NIFL Premiership side Coleraine.

== Career statistics ==
As of match played 1 November 2025

Appearances and goals by club, season and competition
Club	Season	League			National Cup (Note: IncludesFAI Cup)		League Cup (Note: Includes League of Ireland Cup)		Europe		Other		Total	
Club	Season	Division	Apps	Goals	Apps	Goals	Apps	Goals	Apps	Goals	Apps	Goals	Apps	Goals
Waterford	2019	LOI Premier Division	12	0	0	0	1	0	–		2	0	15	0
Cork City	2020	LOI Premier Division	6	0	2	0	–		–		1	0	9	0
Cork City	2021	LOI First Division	0	0	0	0	–		–		0	0	0	0
Cork City	Total		6	0	2	0	–		–		1	0	9	0
Finn Harps	2022	LOI Premier Division	30	0	1	0	–		–		–		31	0
Galway United	2023	LOI First Division	33	5	4	0	–		–		–		37	5
Galway United	2024	LOI Premier Division	28	2	1	0	–		–		–		29	2
Galway United	2025	LOI Premier Division	36	1	3	0	–		–		–		39	1
Galway United	Total		97	7	8	0	–		–		–		105	7
Derry City	2026	LOI Premier Division	8	1	1	0	–		1 (Note: appearance in the Europa League)	0	1 (Note: appearance in the President's Cup)	0	11	1
Coleraine	2026–27	NIFL Premiership	0	0	0	0	0	0	–		–		11	1
Career total			153	8	12	0	1	0	1	0	4	0	171	8

== International career ==
While at UCC, Slevin was selected for the Irish Colleges and Universities national team for the 2019 Summer Universiade in Naples, Italy. He played against South Korea, Uruguay, Russia, Ukraine and France at the tournament, and later described the experience as "very professional" and beneficial for his development.

== Style of play ==
Slevin is primarily a left-sided centre-back but is also comfortable playing at left-back. Standing at 1.88m tall, he has been noted for his aerial ability and versatility, as well as his defensive work-rate and willingness to put team needs ahead of personal recognition.

== Personal life ==
Slevin studied for a commerce degree at University College Cork, balancing full-time studies with his commitments to UCC and later Cork City. He has spoken about the challenges of managing training, gym work and matches alongside academic work, describing the need to find "a happy medium" between the two.

A boyhood supporter of Manchester United, Slevin has cited Cristiano Ronaldo as a player he idolised growing up.

== Honours ==
=== UCC ===
- Collingwood Cup: 2019
- Munster Senior League Premier Division: 2018–19

=== Galway United ===
- League of Ireland First Division: 2023

=== Individual ===
- FAI Colleges and Universities International Player of the Year: 2019
- PFAI First Division Team of the Year: 2023
