= Francely Lomboto =

Irish footballer (born 2000)

Personal information
- Date of birth: 2 July 2000 (age 26)
- Place of birth: Galway, Ireland
- Height: 1.86 m (6 ft 1 in)
- Position: Winger

Team information
- Current team: Galway United
- Number: 9

Youth career
- Galway Hibernians
- –2020: Galway United

Senior career*
Years	Team	Apps	(Gls)
2020–2024	Galway United	73	(8)
2025	Sligo Rovers	25	(4)
2025	Glenavon	12	(1)
2026–	Galway United	26	(2)
- * Club domestic league appearances and goals as of 18:49, 10 November 2026 (UTC)

Francely Lomboto (born 2 July 2000) is an Irish professional footballer who plays as a winger for League of Ireland Premier Division club Galway United.

== Early life ==
Lomboto was born on 2 July 2000 in Galway, Ireland and is of Democratic Republic of the Congo descent through his parents. A native of Galway, Ireland, he attended the Institute of Technology, Sligo in the Republic of Ireland, where he studied business.

== Career ==
=== Galway United ===
As a youth player, Lomboto joined the youth academy of Galway Hibernians. In 2020, he signed for Galway United. Ahead of the 2021 season, he suffered a leg injury. Irish news website Galway Beo wrote in 2022 that he "matured into a dangerous attacking wideman" while playing for the club. During the 2023 season, he helped the club achieve promotion from the second tier to the top flight.

=== Sligo Rovers ===
In November 2024, he signed for Sligo Rovers for the 2025 season. On 23 June 2025, he scored the winner in a 2–1 victory over his former side Galway United with a Backheel finish through the goalkeeper's legs.

=== Glenavon ===
On 31 July 2025, it was announced that NIFL Premiership club Glenavon had signed Lomboto for an undisclosed fee. He made his debut in a 2–0 defeat to Ballymena United. On 21 November 2025, Glenavon confirmed that Lomboto had departed the club by mutual consent, having scored 3 goals in 16 appearances in all competitions.

=== Return to Galway United ===
On 7 January 2026, he returned to his hometown club Galway United ahead of the 2026 season.

== Personal life ==
His younger brother Gradi Lomboto is also a professional footballer who plays for Athlone Town in the League of Ireland First Division.

== Career statistics ==
As of match played on 30 October 2026

Appearances and goals by club, season and competition
Club	Season	League			National Cup (Note: Includes FAI Cup & Irish Cup)		League Cup (Note: Includes League of Ireland Cup & Northern Ireland Football League Cup)		Other		Total	
Club	Season	Division	Apps	Goals	Apps	Goals	Apps	Goals	Apps	Goals	Apps	Goals
Galway United	2020	LOI First Division	9	2	0	0	0	0	1 (Note: Appearance in the 2020 League of Ireland First Division Playoffs)	0	10	2
Galway United	2021	LOI First Division	0	0	0	0	—		0 (Note: Appearances in the 2021 League of Ireland First Division Playoffs)	0	0	0
Galway United	2022	LOI First Division	20	1	2	2	—		1 (Note: Appearance in the 2022 League of Ireland First Division Playoffs)	0	23	3
Galway United	2023	LOI First Division	33	6	4	0	—		—		37	6
Galway United	2024	LOI Premier Division	20	1	2	1	—		—		22	2
Galway United	Total		73	8	8	3	0	0	2	0	83	11
Sligo Rovers	2025	LOI Premier Division	25	4	0	0	—		—		25	4
Glenavon	2025–26	NIFL Premiership	12	1	0	0	2	1	2 (Note: Appearances in the Mid-Ulster Cup)	1	16	3
Galway United	2026	LOI Premier Division	26	2	4	1	—		—		30	3
Career Total			136	15	12	4	2	1	4	1	154	21

== Honours ==
Galway United

- League of Ireland First Division: 2023
