= Ronan Manning =

Irish footballer (born 2000)

Personal information
- Full name: Ronan Manning
- Date of birth: 15 May 2000 (age 26)
- Place of birth: Galway, Republic of Ireland
- Height: 1.77 m (5 ft 10 in)
- Position: Midfielder

Team information
- Current team: Treaty United
- Number: 31

Youth career
- –2015: Cregmore
- 2015–2016: Mervue United
- 2017: Galway United

Senior career*
Years	Team	Apps	(Gls)
2017–2018	Galway United	11	(2)
2019–2020	Athlone Town	18	(8)
2021–2024	Galway United	37	(5)
2025	Sligo Rovers	19	(0)
2026–	Treaty United	0	(0)

International career^{‡}
2018	Republic of Ireland U18	2	(0)
- * Club domestic league appearances and goals as of 15:18, 6 March 2026 (UTC) ‡ National team caps and goals as of 18:30, 4 June 2025 (UTC)

Ronan Manning (born 15 May 2000) is an Irish professional footballer who plays as a midfielder for League of Ireland First Division club Treaty United. His other previous clubs are Galway United, Athlone Town and Sligo Rovers.

== Club career ==
=== Youth career ===
Galway native Manning began playing with local club Cregmore, then Mervue United where he played for 2 seasons, before signing for Galway United's under-19 side in 2017.

=== Galway United ===
He made his senior debut for Galway United on 29 July 2017, coming off the bench in a 2–1 loss to Cork City at Turners Cross in the League of Ireland Premier Division. On 3 January 2018, he signed a contract extension with the club following their relegation to the League of Ireland First Division. He scored his first goal in senior football on 23 February 2018, in a 4–1 win over Athlone Town at Eamonn Deacy Park.

=== Athlone Town ===
In April 2019, Manning signed for fellow League of Ireland First Division club Athlone Town. He had to wait until 28 February 2020 for his first appearance due to injury troubles, but he scored a 49th minute debut goal in a 3–1 defeat to Cabinteely at the Athlone Town Stadium. He scored 9 goals in 31 appearances in all competitions in an impressive 2020 season with the club.

=== Return to Galway United ===
On 9 December 2020, Manning returned to Galway United for the 2021 season. His first season back at the club was a disappointment however, as he missed the early part of the season through injury, before coming back to make 2 appearances in April, then suffering another injury that kept him out of action for the rest of the season. On 2 January 2022, Manning signed a new one-year contract with the club. On 29 April 2022, he scored his first goal since returning to the club, finding the top corner with 15 minutes to go to set his team on the way to a comeback from a 2-goal deficit to win 3–2 at the Markets Field. On 28 November 2022, he signed a new contract with the club. He scored a total of 3 goals in 21 appearances in all competitions as his side won the 2023 League of Ireland First Division title to gain promotion. He suffered an injury in early 2024 that was initially due to keep him out of action for five months, but after several incorrect diagnosis, he ended up missing the entire season.

=== Sligo Rovers ===
On 20 December 2024, Manning signed for Galway's League of Ireland Premier Division rivals Sligo Rovers.

=== Treaty United ===
On 6 March 2026, Manning signed for League of Ireland First Division club Treaty United.

== Personal life ==
He is the brother of fellow professional footballer Ryan Manning, who has played in the Premier League and for the Republic of Ireland national team.

== Career statistics ==
As of match played on 17 October 2025

Appearances and goals by club, season and competition
Club	Season	League			National Cup (Note: Includes FAI Cup)		League Cup (Note: Includes League of Ireland Cup)		Other		Total	
Club	Season	Division	Apps	Goals	Apps	Goals	Apps	Goals	Apps	Goals	Apps	Goals
Galway United	2017	LOI Premier Division	3	0	2	0	1	0	—		6	0
Galway United	2018	LOI First Division	8	2	0	0	2	0	—		10	2
Galway United	Total		11	2	2	0	3	0	—		16	2
Athlone Town	2019	LOI First Division	0	0	0	0	0	0	0 (Note: Appearances in the Leinster Senior Cup)	0	0	0
Athlone Town	2020	LOI First Division	18	8	3	1	0	0	—		21	9
Athlone Town	Total		18	8	3	1	0	0	0	0	21	9
Galway United	2021	LOI First Division	2	0	0	0	—		0 (Note: Appearances in the 2021 League of Ireland First Division Playoffs)	0	2	0
Galway United	2022	LOI First Division	16	3	1	0	—		2 (Note: Appearances in the 2022 League of Ireland First Division Playoffs)	0	19	3
Galway United	2023	LOI First Division	19	2	2	1	—		—		21	3
Galway United	2024	LOI Premier Division	0	0	0	0	—		—		0	0
Galway United	Total		37	5	3	1	—		2	0	42	6
Sligo Rovers	2025	LOI Premier Division	19	0	2	0	—		—		21	0
Treaty United	2026	LOI First Division	0	0	0	0	—		—		0	0
Total			85	15	10	2	3	0	2	0	100	17

== Honours ==
Galway United

- League of Ireland First Division: 2023
