= Wassim Aouachria =

Association football player (born 2000)

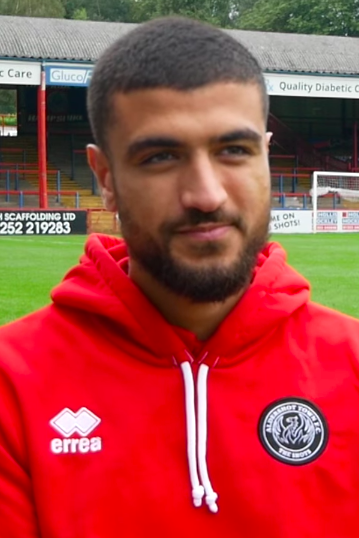
- Aouachria with Aldershot Town in 2021

Personal information
- Full name: Wassim Chouaib Aouachria
- Date of birth: 12 May 2000 (age 26)
- Place of birth: Roubaix, France
- Height: 1.88 m (6 ft 2 in)
- Position: Forward

Youth career
- 2006–2013: Aubagne
- 2013–2019: Marseille
- 2019–2022: Charlton Athletic

Senior career*
Years	Team	Apps	(Gls)
2020–2022	Charlton Athletic	0	(0)
2021	→ Aldershot Town (loan)	6	(0)
2021–2022	→ Braintree Town (loan)	0	(0)
2022	→ Hampton & Richmond Borough (loan)	11	(1)
2022–2023	Waterford	25	(10)
2023–2024	Galway United	23	(6)
2024–2025	Glentoran	15	(1)
2025–2026	Vihren Sandanski	12	(3)

International career^{‡}
2018	Algeria U18	3	(0)
- * Club domestic league appearances and goals as of 21:49, 12 March 2026 (UTC) ‡ National team caps and goals as of 17:10, 19 December 2023 (UTC)

Wassim Chouaib Aouachria (Arabic: وسيم شعيب عواشرية; born 12 May 2000) is a professional footballer who plays as a forward.

A youth product of Marseille, Aouachria moved to English club Charlton Athletic in 2019, making his senior debut in 2020. Aouachria was born in France to Algerian parents, and holds dual-citizenship; he represented Algeria internationally at youth level at the 2018 Mediterranean Games.

== Club career ==
=== Youth career ===
Aouachria was born on 12 March 2000 in Roubaix, France, to parents from Annaba, Algeria. He began playing youth football at local club Aubagne in 2006, aged six, before joining Marseille's under-14 team in 2013.

=== Charlton Athletic ===
On 16 January 2019, Aouachria joined Charlton Athletic's Under-23 squad on a short-term contract from Marseille. The player stated that "the reason for leaving Marseille was due to his lack of promotion to the reserve team and his unwillingness to continue with the under-19 team".

On 2 May 2019, his contract was extended until June 2021. During a training session with the first team, Aoucharia suffered an ACL injury; he had scored five goals in nine starts for the U23 team prior to his injury. He remained on the sidelines for over one year.

Aouachria made his professional debut for the senior team on 10 November 2020, scoring in a 3–1 win against Leyton Orient in the EFL Trophy.

On 23 May 2022, it was announced that Aouachria was leaving Charlton Athletic at the end of his contract.

==== Loans to the National League ====
On 31 August 2021, Aouachria joined Aldershot Town on an initial three-month loan.

On 11 December 2021, Aouachria joined National League South side Braintree Town on loan until 3 January 2022.

On 18 March 2022, Aouachria joined Hampton & Richmond Borough on a month's loan. Aouachria scored his first goal for Hampton & Richmond Borough in a 2–0 victory over Billericay Town on 9 April 2022.

=== Waterford ===
On 4 July 2022, Aouachria joined Waterford of the League of Ireland First Division, the Republic of Ireland's second tier. He scored his first goals on 31 July, helping his team beat St Patrick's Athletic 3–2 with a brace in the FAI Cup.

=== Galway United ===
On 4 July 2023, it was announced that Aouachria had joined League of Ireland First Division leaders Galway United.

=== Glentoran ===
On 23 June 2024, Aouachria signed for NIFL Premiership side Glentoran. On 16 May 2025, Glentoran confirmed his departure on the expiry of his contract.

== International career ==
Born in France, Aouachria has represented Algeria internationally at under-18 level at the 2018 Mediterranean Games: he played against France, Bosnia and Herzegovina, and Spain. In an interview in 2020, Aouachria stated his preference to represent Algeria internationally over France.

== Style of play ==
Aouachria is a versatile forward capable of playing as a number 10 or a winger. His main attributes are his technical ability and finishing.

== Personal life ==
Aouachria described Zinedine Zidane's performances at the 2006 FIFA World Cup as the "trigger" for him to start playing football. The player that he prefers to watch is Nabil Fekir, whereas his favourite Algerian national is Riyad Mahrez.

== Career statistics ==
As of match played 16 February 2026

Appearances and goals by club, season and competition
Club	Season	League			National cup (Note: Includes FA Cup, FAI Cup and Irish Cup)		League cup (Note: Includes EFL Cup and Irish League Cup)		Other		Total	
Club	Season	Division	Apps	Goals	Apps	Goals	Apps	Goals	Apps	Goals	Apps	Goals
Charlton Athletic	2020–21	League One	0	0	0	0	0	0	1 (Note: Appearance in EFL Trophy)	1	1	1
Charlton Athletic	2021–22	League One	0	0	0	0	0	0	1	0	1	0
Charlton Athletic	Total		0	0	0	0	0	0	2	1	2	1
Aldershot Town (loan)	2021–22	National League	6	0	1	0	—		0	0	7	0
Braintree Town (loan)	2021–22	National League South	0	0	—		—		0	0	0	0
Hampton & Richmond Borough (loan)	2021–22	National League South	11	1	—		—		1 (Note: Appearance in Middlesex Senior Charity Cup)	0	12	1
Waterford	2022	LOI First Division	12	6	3	4	—		4 (Note: Appearances in League of Ireland promotion/relegation playoffs)	2	19	12
Waterford	2023	LOI First Division	13	4	—		—		2 (Note: Appearances in Munster Senior Cup)	1	15	5
Waterford	Total		25	10	3	4	—		6	3	34	17
Galway United	2023	LOI First Division	14	6	3	2	—		—		17	8
Galway United	2024	LOI Premier Division	9	0	0	0	—		—		9	0
Galway United	Total		23	6	3	2	—		—		26	8
Glentoran	2024–25	NIFL Premiership	15	1	0	0	1	0	—		16	1
Vihren Sandanski	2025–26	Second League	12	3	0	0	0	0	—		12	3
Career total			92	21	7	6	1	0	9	4	109	31

== Honours ==
Galway United

- League of Ireland First Division: 2023

Glentoran

- County Antrim Shield: 2024–25
