= Ed McCarthy =

Irish footballer (born 2001)

Personal information
- Full name: Edward McCarthy
- Date of birth: 20 April 2001 (age 25)
- Place of birth: Limerick, Ireland
- Height: 1.70 m (5 ft 7 in)
- Position: Winger

Team information
- Current team: Galway United
- Number: 24

Youth career
- –2020: Regional United
- 2020–2021: Cork City

Senior career*
Years	Team	Apps	(Gls)
2020	Cork City	0	(0)
2021	Treaty United	21	(2)
2021	Regional United		
2022–	Galway United	158	(19)
- * Club domestic league appearances and goals as of 19:08, 10 November 2026 (UTC)

Edward McCarthy (born 20 April 2001) is an Irish professional footballer who plays as a winger for League of Ireland Premier Division club Galway United.

McCarthy was born in Limerick and played youth football with Regional United and Cork City before starting his professional career with Treaty United.

== Youth career ==
McCarthy played youth football with local side, Regional United before signing for Cork City’s U19s for the 2020 season.

== Career ==
=== Treaty United ===
In February 2021 McCarthy began his professional career with League of Ireland First Division side Treaty United in their first season as a club. In September 2021 McCarthy left Treaty due to work commitments, returning to Limerick & District League side Regional United.

=== Galway United ===
On 5 February 2022 McCarthy signed for League of Ireland First Division side Galway United.

On 25 March 2023, McCarthy scored a hat-trick in Galway United’s record 9–1 win over Kerry. In his second season at the club McCarthy scored 8 league goals as Galway won the 2023 League of Ireland First Division by 25 points gaining promotion to the League of Ireland Premier Division. He was named in the 2023 PFAI First Division Team of the Year by his fellow players for his performances throughout the season.

He scored 4 goals in 37 appearances in all competitions in his first season in the top flight in 2024.

== Personal life ==
In November 2020, McCarthy received a two-year suspended prison sentence and a seven-year ban from driving for causing the death of Polish man Andrzej Obalek on 18 February 2020, when driving home to Limerick after training in Cork, with his car veering onto the wrong side of the road while he was driving at an excessive speed and causing a three car collision.

In February 2024, his club Galway United apologised for social media posts containing McCarthy smiling while holding a Stop sign and a Driver with the song Murder on the Dancefloor. Some of the victim's family and friends deemed the posts a 'mockery' with a friend of the deceased stating "I believe that the person who caused Andrzej's death should be locked in prison for a very long time, not messing around."

== Career statistics ==
As of match played 30 October 2026

Appearances and goals by club, season and competition
Club	Season	League			FAI Cup		Other		Total	
Club	Season	Division	Apps	Goals	Apps	Goals	Apps	Goals	Apps	Goals
Cork City	2020	LOI Premier Division	0	0	0	0	2 (Note: Appearances in the Munster Senior Cup)	0	2	0
Treaty United	2021	LOI First Division	21	2	1	0	—		22	2
Galway United	2022	LOI First Division	29	3	1	0	3 (Note: Appearances in the 2022 Promotion/relegation play-offs)	0	33	3
Galway United	2023	LOI First Division	35	8	3	1	—		38	9
Galway United	2024	LOI Premier Division	36	4	1	0	—		37	4
Galway United	2025	LOI Premier Division	25	1	2	0	—		27	1
Galway United	2026	LOI Premier Division	31	3	2	0	—		33	3
Galway United	Total		158	19	9	1	3	0	168	20
Career total			178	21	10	1	5	0	192	23

== Honours ==
Galway United

- League of Ireland First Division: 2023
