= Ibrahim Keita =

French footballer (born 1996)

Personal information
- Full name: Ibrahim Div-Keïta
- Date of birth: 18 January 1996 (age 30)
- Place of birth: Vernon, France
- Height: 1.89 m (6 ft 2 in)
- Position: Forward

Team information
- Current team: Dunav Ruse
- Number: 18

Youth career
- 2003–2005: Vernon AP
- 2005–2007: SPN Vernon
- 2007–2009: Saint-Marcel Football
- 2009–2011: Évreux FC 27
- 2011–2015: Wolverhampton Wanderers
- 2015–2016: Košice
- 2016–2017: AEL

Senior career*
Years	Team	Apps	(Gls)
2017	Doxa Proskinites	11	(1)
2017–2018	Finn Harps	13	(1)
2018–2019	Olympia Prague	12	(2)
2018–2019	→ Příbram (loan)	20	(3)
2019–2023	Bohemians 1905	62	(7)
2019–2023	Bohemians 1905 B	12	(0)
2023	Galway United	9	(4)
2024	Tabor Sežana	9	(3)
2024	Etar Veliko Tarnovo	16	(6)
2025	Krumovgrad	16	(1)
2025–	Dunav Ruse	41	(12)

International career
2012	France U16	2	(0)
- * Club domestic league appearances and goals as of 10 November 2026

Ibrahim Div-Keïta (born 18 January 1996) is a French professional footballer who plays as a forward for Bulgarian First League club Dunav Ruse.

== Career ==
In 2015, Keita left English club Wolverhampton Wanderers.

In 2017, he signed for Irish side Finn Harps after playing for VSS Košice in Slovakia and Greek teams AEL and Doxa Proskinites.

In 2018, he signed for FK Olympia Prague in the Czech Republic.

In February 2024, Keita signed for Slovenian Second League club Tabor Sežana.

In August 2024, he moved to Bulgarian Second League club Etar Veliko Tarnovo.

== Career statistics ==
=== Club ===
As of 26 May 2023.

Appearances and goals by club, season and competition
Club	Season	League			Cup		Other		Total	
Club	Season	Division	Apps	Goals	Apps	Goals	Apps	Goals	Apps	Goals
Doxa Proskinites	2016–17	Football League 2	11	1	0	0	–		11	1
Finn Harps	2017	League of Ireland Premier Division	13	1	0	0	0	0	13	1
Olympia Prague	2017–18	Czech National Football League	12	2	0	0	0	0	12	2
Příbram (loan)	2018–19	Czech First League	18	2	0	0	2 (Note: Appearances in the Czech First League Relegation play-offs)	1	20	3
Bohemians 1905	2019–20	Czech First League	22	2	2 (Note: Appearances in the Czech Cup)	1	2	0	26	3
Bohemians 1905	2020–21	Czech First League	23	3	1	0	1	0	25	3
Bohemians 1905	2021–22	Czech First League	17	2	3	0	3	0	23	2
Bohemians 1905	Total		62	7	6	1	6	0	74	8
Bohemians 1905 B	2019–20	Bohemian Football League	2	0	–				2	0
Bohemians 1905 B	2020–21	Bohemian Football League	2	0	–				2	0
Bohemians 1905 B	2021–22	Bohemian Football League	8	0	–				8	0
Bohemians 1905 B	Total		12	0	–				12	0
Galway United	2023	League of Ireland First Division	9	4	0	0	–		9	4
Career total			137	17	6	1	8	1	151	19
