= James Bolger (footballer) =

Irish footballer (born 2000)

Personal information
- Date of birth: 19 November 2000 (age 25)
- Place of birth: Boyle, Ireland
- Height: 1.88 m (6 ft 2 in)
- Position: Defender

Team information
- Current team: Drogheda United
- Number: 18

Youth career
- –2018: Boyle Celtic
- 2019: Galway United

College career
Years	Team	Apps	(Gls)
2019–2023	Northwestern Red Raiders	68	(18)
2023	Longwood Lancers	15	(2)

Senior career*
Years	Team	Apps	(Gls)
2024	Bodens BK	13	(4)
2024–	Drogheda United	58	(0)
- * Club domestic league appearances and goals as of 18:18, 10 November 2026 (UTC)

James Bolger (born 19 November 2000) is an Irish footballer who plays as a defender for League of Ireland First Division club Drogheda United.

== Early life ==
Bolger was born on 19 November 2000 in Boyle, Ireland. The son of Francis Bolger and Catherine Bolger, he is the nephew of Gaelic football coach Peter Bolger.

Growing up, he suffered from Osgood–Schlatter disease. After graduating secondary school, he attended Northwestern College in the United States, where he studied business and sports management, and Longwood University in the United States, where he studied business.

== Career ==
Bolger started his career with Swedish side Bodens BK in 2024, where he made thirteen league appearances and scored four goals. In 2024, he signed for Irish side Drogheda United, helping the club win the 2024 FAI Cup. During his first season with them, he made twelve league appearances and scored zero goals. He made 24 appearances in all competitions in 2026, as the club was relegated following a 2–1 defeat to UCD in the Promotion/Relegation Playoff.

== Honours ==
Drogheda United

- FAI Cup: 2024
