= Wilson Waweru =

Irish footballer (born 2000)

Personal information
- Date of birth: 27 December 2000 (age 25)
- Place of birth: Galway, Ireland
- Position: Forward

Team information
- Current team: Hampton & Richmond Borough (on loan from Wealdstone)
- Number: 23

Youth career
- Mervue United
- –2018: Galway United

Senior career*
Years	Team	Apps	(Gls)
2018–2023	Galway United	81	(16)
2023	→ Cobh Ramblers (loan)	30	(13)
2024–2025	Sligo Rovers	44	(9)
2026	Cobh Ramblers	20	(4)
2026–	Wealdstone	5	(0)
2026–	→ Hampton & Richmond Borough (loan)	2	(2)
- * Club domestic league appearances and goals as of 01:29, 28 October 2026 (UTC)

Wilson Waweru (born 27 December 2000) is an Irish footballer who plays as a forward for Hampton & Richmond Borough, on loan from National League club Wealdstone.

== Early life ==
Waweru was born on 27 December 2000 in Galway, Ireland, where he also grew up. He is of Kenyan descent through both of his parents.

== Career ==
As a youth player, Waweru joined the youth academy of Galway United and was promoted to the club's senior team, debuting at the age of seventeen and helping them achieve second place in the league.

In 2023, he was loaned out to League of Ireland First Division club Cobh Ramblers, where he made thirty-three league appearances and scored thirteen goals and helped the club win the 2023 Munster Senior Cup. Ahead of the 2024 season, he signed for League of Ireland Premier Division side Sligo Rovers. On 24 February 2024, he debuted for the club during a 0–0 draw with Derry City in the league.

On 12 December 2025, Waweru signed for Cobh Ramblers on a permanent basis ahead of the 2026 League of Ireland First Division season. On 17 January 2026, he made his first appearance since returning to the club, scoring twice in a 3–0 win over Leeside United in the Munster Senior Cup.

On 14 August 2026, Waweru joined National League side Wealdstone following a successful trial period.

On 10 October 2026, Waweru joined National League South club Hampton & Richmond Borough on a three-month loan.

== Style of play ==
Waweru plays as a forward and is right-footed. Known for his speed and strength, he can also play as a winger.

== Personal life ==
Waweru's younger brother Lewis Waweru, plays for FAI National League club Mervue United.

== Career statistics ==
As of match played on 24 October 2026

Appearances and goals by club, season and competition
Club	Season	League			National Cup (Note: Includes FAI Cup & FA Cup)		League Cup (Note: Includes League of Ireland Cup & National League Cup)		Other		Total	
Club	Season	Division	Apps	Goals	Apps	Goals	Apps	Goals	Apps	Goals	Apps	Goals
Galway United	2018	LOI First Division	3	0	2	0	0	0	—		5	0
Galway United	2019	LOI First Division	15	2	0	0	1	0	—		16	2
Galway United	2020	LOI First Division	10	2	0	0	1	1	2 (Note: Appearances in the 2020 League of Ireland First Division Promotion Playoffs)	1	13	4
Galway United	2021	LOI First Division	24	8	1	0	—		2 (Note: Appearances in the 2021 League of Ireland First Division Promotion Playoffs)	0	27	8
Galway United	2022	LOI First Division	28	4	1	0	—		1 (Note: Appearances in the 2022 League of Ireland First Division Promotion Playoffs)	0	30	4
Galway United	2023	LOI First Division	0	0	—		—		—		0	0
Galway United	Total		81	16	4	0	2	1	4	0	91	18
Cobh Ramblers (loan)	2023	LOI First Division	30	13	1	0	—		5 (Note: 3 appearances in the 2023 League of Ireland First Division Promotion Playoffs; 2 appearances, 2 goals in the Munster Senior Cup)	2	36	15
Sligo Rovers	2024	LOI Premier Division	28	7	2	3	—		—		30	10
Sligo Rovers	2025	LOI Premier Division	16	2	2	0	—		—		18	2
Sligo Rovers	Total		44	9	4	3	—		—		48	12
Cobh Ramblers	2026	LOI First Division	20	4	0	0	—		2 (Note: Appearances in the Munster Senior Cup)	3	22	7
Wealdstone	2026–27	National League	5	0	0	0	2	3	0	0	7	3
Hampton & Richmond Borough (loan)	2026–27	National League South	2	2	–		–		–		2	2
Career Total			182	44	9	3	2	1	13	9	206	57
