= David Hurley (footballer) =

Irish footballer (born 1998)

Personal information
- Date of birth: 21 October 1998 (age 28)
- Place of birth: Cork, Ireland
- Position: Midfielder

Team information
- Current team: Galway United
- Number: 10

Youth career
- 2003–2010: Tramore Athletic
- 2010–2013: Avondale United
- 2013–2016: Ringmahon Rangers
- 2016–2017: Cobh Ramblers

Senior career*
Years	Team	Apps	(Gls)
2017–2020	Cobh Ramblers	70	(4)
2021–	Galway United	207	(37)
- * Club domestic league appearances and goals as of 18:55, 10 November 2026 (UTC)

David Hurley (born 21 October 1998) is an Irish professional footballer who plays as a midfielder for League of Ireland Premier Division club Galway United. He previously played for Cobh Ramblers.

== Career ==
=== Youth career ===
Cork native Hurley began playing schoolboy football with local club Tramore Athletic, before moving on to Avondale United at under-13 level and then spent 3 seasons with Ringmahon Rangers, where he was a teammate of future Liverpool and Republic of Ireland goalkeeper Caoimhín Kelleher, winning two leagues and a local cup together, as well as reaching the FAI Youth Cup final in his last year at the club. He joined the academy of League of Ireland club Cobh Ramblers in July 2016, joining up with the club's under-19 side.

=== Cobh Ramblers ===
On 1 September 2017, Hurley made his senior debut for Cobh Ramblers in a late 1–0 win away to Athlone Town. On 7 October 2017, in the last game of the season, Hurley scored the first goal of his career in a 2–1 win over League of Ireland First Division champions Waterford at St Colman's Park. Having played for both the club's under-19 and first team in 2017, ahead of the 2018 season, he was called up to become a full member of the first team squad. On 16 September 2018, Hurley featured in the 2018 League of Ireland Cup final, which his side lost 3–1 to Derry City at the Ryan McBride Brandywell Stadium. He signed up for a third season with the club on 23 December 2018. He scored 1 goal in 26 appearances in the 2019 season as his side finished in 6th place. On 8 January 2020, Hurley signed a new contract with the club. He scored 4 goals in 82 appearances during his 4 seasons with the club.

=== Galway United ===
On 20 November 2020, Hurley signed for fellow League of Ireland First Division club Galway United ahead of their 2021 season. On 14 May 2021, he scored his first goal for the club, a 95th-minute winner against Wexford at Eamonn Deacy Park. Hurley and his side were defeated 3–0 by Waterford on 4 November 2022 in the 2022 League of Ireland First Division Play-off Final. On 5 December 2022, Hurley signed a new contract with the club. On 21 August 2023, he scored twice in a 5–1 win away to UCD at the UCD Bowl to help earn his side a place in the Quarter Final of the FAI Cup. On 28 August 2023, he became just the third Galway United player in the club's history to reach 20 league goals, when he scored two of his side's goals in a 4–1 win at home to his former club Cobh Ramblers. On 22 September 2023, Hurley scored in a 4–0 win over Kerry at Mounthawk Park to secure promotion back to the Premier Division by winning the 2023 League of Ireland First Division title. He was named Galway United Player of the Year for 2023 at the club's end of season awards. Hurley was also named in the PFAI First Division Team of the Year for 2023 by his fellow professionals. He signed a new contract with the club on 1 December 2023. On 1 March 2024, Hurley scored his first League of Ireland Premier Division goal, scoring the winner in a 2–1 victory over Waterford at Eamonn Deacy Park. On 1 November 2024. He scored in a 1–1 draw away to Bohemians at Dalymount Park in the final game of the season as his side finished in 5th place in their first year back in the top flight. Hurley signed up for a 5th season with the club on 30 November 2024. On 20 June 2025, he scored from his own half in a 3–1 win over St Patrick's Athletic with goalkeeper Joseph Anang's clearance falling straight to Hurley while 40 yards out of his goal. On 24 November 2025 Hurley signed on for his 6th season at the club.

== Career statistics ==
As of match played on 30 October 2026

Appearances and goals by club, season and competition
Club	Season	League			National Cup (Note: Includes FAI Cup)		League Cup (Note: Includes League of Ireland Cup)		Other		Total	
Club	Season	Division	Apps	Goals	Apps	Goals	Apps	Goals	Apps	Goals	Apps	Goals
Cobh Ramblers	2017	LOI First Division	4	1	0	0	0	0	0 (Note: Appearance(s) in the Munster Senior Cup)	0	4	1
Cobh Ramblers	2018	LOI First Division	27	0	1	0	4	0	—		32	0
Cobh Ramblers	2019	LOI First Division	22	1	0	0	2	0	2	0	26	1
Cobh Ramblers	2020	LOI First Division	17	2	1	0	1	0	1	0	20	2
Cobh Ramblers	Total		70	4	2	0	7	0	3	0	82	4
Galway United	2021	LOI First Division	23	2	0	0	—		2 (Note: Appearances in the 2021 League of Ireland Promotion/Relegation Playoffs)	0	25	2
Galway United	2022	LOI First Division	32	6	2	1	—		3 (Note: Appearances in the 2022 League of Ireland Promotion/Relegation Playoffs)	1	37	8
Galway United	2023	LOI First Division	36	21	4	3	—		—		40	24
Galway United	2024	LOI Premier Division	36	2	2	1	—		—		38	3
Galway United	2025	LOI Premier Division	34	4	3	2	—		—		37	6
Galway United	2026	LOI Premier Division	36	2	2	1	—		—		38	3
Galway United	Total		207	37	13	8	—		5	1	215	46
Career Total			267	41	15	9	7	0	8	1	297	50

== Honours ==
=== Club ===
Galway United

- League of Ireland First Division (1): 2023

=== Individual ===
- Galway United Player of the Year (1): 2023
- PFAI First Division Team of the Year (1): 2023
