= Killian Brouder =

Irish footballer (born 1998)

Personal information
- Full name: Killian Brouder
- Date of birth: 20 August 1998 (age 28)
- Place of birth: Newcastle West, County Limerick
- Height: 1.88 m (6 ft 2 in)
- Position: Centre-back

Team information
- Current team: Galway United
- Number: 5

Youth career
- Newcastle West
- Mungret Regional
- 2013–2016: Limerick

Senior career*
Years	Team	Apps	(Gls)
2016–2019	Limerick	37	(0)
2019–	Galway United	192	(14)
- * Club domestic league appearances and goals as of 16:56, 31 October 2026 (UTC)

Killian Brouder (born 20 August 1998) is an Irish professional footballer who plays as a centre-back for League of Ireland Premier Division side Galway United. He has previously played for Limerick.

Brouder was born in Newcastle West and played youth football with Newcastle West and Mungret Regional before signing for Limerick. Brouder would go on to join Galway United in 2019, spending 8 seasons at the club.

== Youth career ==
In his youth Brouder played with Limerick Desmond League side Newcastle West and Limerick & District League side Mungret Regional before joining Limerick at U16 level.

== Career ==
=== Limerick ===
On 1 October 2016 Brouder made his debut for Limerick coming on as a substitute in a League of Ireland First Division match against Cobh Ramblers.

Brouder departed Limerick halfway through the 2019 season. This was a season where Limerick were deducted 26 points and went on to be liquidated, being replaced by Treaty United.

=== Galway United ===
On 29 July 2019, Brouder signed for League of Ireland First Division side Galway United.

In the 2022 season, Brouder made the PFAI First Division Team of the Year. In the 2023 season, Brouder was a part of a Galway United team that won the league by 25 points, gaining promotion to the Premier Division.

== Career statistics ==
As of match played 30 October 2026

Appearances and goals by club, season and competition
Club	Season	League			FAI Cup		League cup		Other		Total	
Club	Season	Division	Apps	Goals	Apps	Goals	Apps	Goals	Apps	Goals	Apps	Goals
Limerick	2016	LOI First Division	1	0	0	0	0	0	0	0	1	0
Limerick	2017	LOI Premier Division	0	0	0	0	0	0	0	0	0	0
Limerick	2018	LOI Premier Division	20	0	3	1	0	0	2 (Note: Appearances in the 2018 Promotion/relegation play-offs)	0	25	1
Limerick	2019	LOI First Division	16	0	0	0	1	0	0	0	17	0
Limerick	Total		37	0	3	1	1	0	2	0	43	1
Galway United	2019	LOI First Division	6	1	3	0	0	0	—		9	1
Galway United	2020	LOI First Division	15	0	1	0	—		2 (Note: Appearances in the 2020 Promotion/relegation play-offs)	1	18	1
Galway United	2021	LOI First Division	22	3	0	0	—		1 (Note: Appearances in the 2021 Promotion/relegation play-offs)	0	23	3
Galway United	2022	LOI First Division	23	3	0	0	—		3 (Note: Appearances in the 2022 Promotion/relegation play-offs)	0	26	3
Galway United	2023	LOI First Division	35	4	4	1	—		—		39	5
Galway United	2024	LOI Premier Division	35	1	2	0	—		—		37	1
Galway United	2025	LOI Premier Division	34	1	3	0	—		—		37	1
Galway United	2026	LOI Premier Division	22	1	1	0	—		—		23	1
Galway United	Total		192	14	14	1	0	0	6	1	212	16
Career total			229	14	17	2	1	0	8	1	255	17

== Honours ==
Galway United

- League of Ireland First Division: 2023
