= Mikie Rowe =

Irish footballer

Personal information
- Full name: Mikie Walsh-Rowe
- Date of birth: 3 July 1996 (age 30)
- Place of birth: Campile, Ireland
- Height: 1.78 m (5 ft 10 in)
- Position: Forward

Team information
- Current team: Wexford
- Number: 7

College career
Years	Team	Apps	(Gls)
2015–2018	Young Harris Mountain Lions	78	(46)

Senior career*
Years	Team	Apps	(Gls)
2014–2015	Waterford	18	(1)
2018–2020	South Georgia Tormenta	48	(7)
2021–2023	Galway United	58	(7)
2023	→ Cobh Ramblers (loan)	15	(5)
2024–	Wexford	65	(33)
- * Club domestic league appearances and goals as of 26 September 2025

Mikie Walsh-Rowe (born 3 July 1996) is an Irish footballer who plays as a forward for Wexford in League of Ireland First Division. On 25 November 2025, Rowe signed a new long-term contract with Wexford.
