= Lissywollen =

Townland, County Westmeath, Ireland

Lissywollen (Irish: Lios Uí Mhulláin) is a townland in Athlone, County Westmeath, Ireland. The townland is in the civil parish of St. Mary's.

The townland stands in the north of the town. Athlone Town Stadium is referred to as Lissywollen, as it stands partly in the townland (with half in the neighbouring townland of Curragh), along with a portion of the M6 motorway.

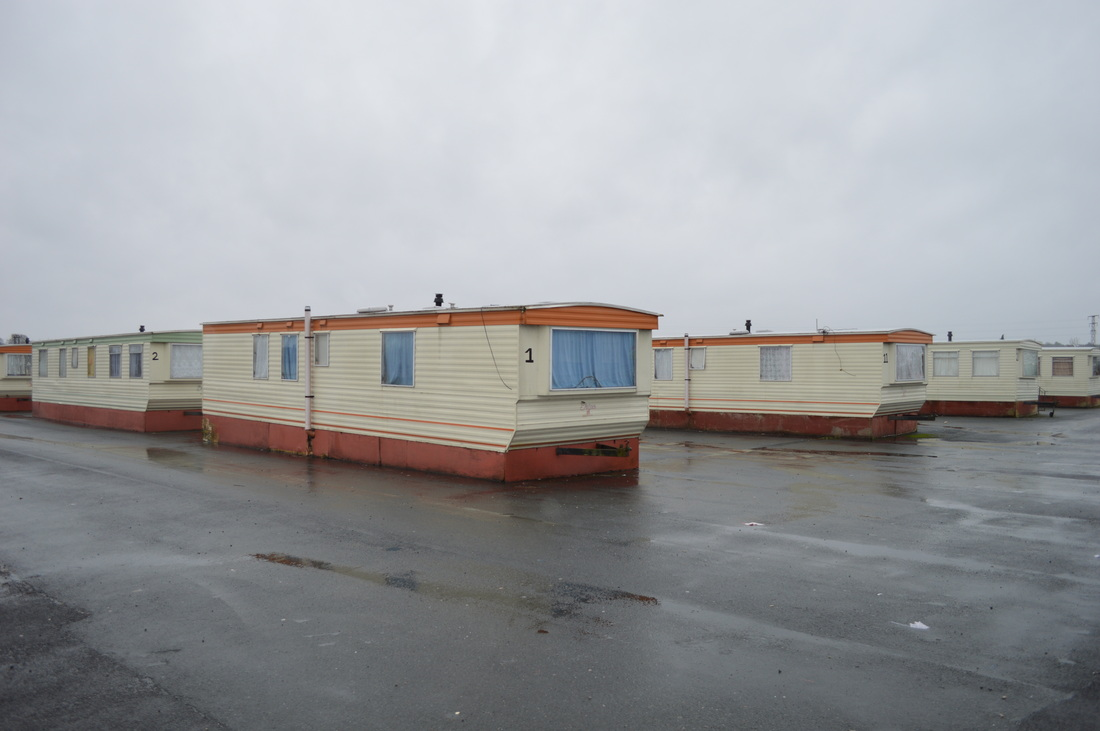
A direct provision centre at Lissywollen, Athlone, in 2013 – one of 34 such centres in Ireland.

A direct provision centre for asylum seekers is located in Lissywollen.
