= 2023 League of Ireland First Division =

39th edition of the 2nd tier competition in association football in Ireland

League of Ireland First Division
- Season: 2023
- Dates: 17 February 2023 – 20 October 2023
- Champions: Galway United
- Promoted: Galway United; Waterford
- Matches: 180
- Goals: 550 (3.06 per match)
- Total attendance: 196,050
- Average attendance: 1,089
- All statistics correct as of 25 November 2023.

The 2023 League of Ireland First Division season was the 39th season of the League of Ireland First Division, the second tier of the Republic of Ireland's association football league.

The winners (Galway United) were promoted to the 2024 League of Ireland Premier Division. The runners-up (Waterford) were also promoted after winning the League of Ireland Premier Division play-off.

== Overview ==
The First Division has 10 teams. Each side plays each other four times for a total of 36 matches in the season. The team that finishes in first place achieve automatic promotion to the Premier Division. Teams finishing second to fifth place will enter the play-offs to determine the side to contest for a place in the 2024 Premier Division against the ninth placed (second last) Premier Division team.

== Teams ==
Locations of the First Division teams

=== Team changes ===
Cork City were promoted to the 2023 Premier Division as 2022 First Division champions. Finn Harps were relegated from the 2022 Premier Division.

=== Additional teams ===
Newly formed Kerry F.C. successfully applied for a First Division licence to compete in the 2023 season.

=== Stadia and locations ===
Team	Location	Stadium	Capacity
Athlone Town	Athlone	Athlone Town Stadium	5,000
Bray Wanderers	Bray	Carlisle Grounds	4,000
Cobh Ramblers	Cobh	St. Colman's Park	3,000
Finn Harps	Ballybofey	Finn Park	6,000
Galway United	Galway	Eamonn Deacy Park	5,000
Kerry	Tralee	Mounthawk Park	1,200
Longford Town	Longford	Bishopsgate	5,097
Treaty United	Limerick	Markets Field	5,000
Waterford	Waterford	RSC	5,160
Wexford	Crossabeg	Ferrycarrig Park	2,500

=== Personnel and kits ===
Note: Flags indicate national team as has been defined under FIFA eligibility rules. Players may hold more than one non-FIFA nationality.

Team	Manager	Captain	Kit manufacturer	Shirt sponsor
Athlone Town	(Portugal) Dario Castelo	(Republic of Ireland) Aaron Connolly	Umbro	Hayden & Co. Solicitors
Bray Wanderers	(Republic of Ireland) Ian Ryan	(Republic of Ireland) Dane Massey	Nike	VisualPrint
Cobh Ramblers	(Republic of Ireland) Shane Keegan	(Republic of Ireland) John Kavanagh	Uhlsport	McCarthy Insurance Group
Finn Harps	(Northern Ireland) Darren Murphy	(Republic of Ireland) Ryan Rainey	Joma	So-Lo Stores
Galway United	(Republic of Ireland) John Caulfield	(Republic of Ireland) Conor McCormack	O'Neill's	Comer Property Management
Kerry	(Republic of Ireland) Billy Dennehy	(Republic of Ireland) Matt Keane	New Balance	Kerry Airport
Longford Town	(Republic of Ireland) Stephen Henderson	(Republic of Ireland) Shane Elworthy	Macron	Bishopsgate
Treaty United	(Republic of Ireland) Tommy Barrett	(Republic of Ireland) Jack Lynch	Umbro	Derrin Homes
Waterford	(Republic of Ireland) Keith Long	(Republic of Ireland) Eddie Nolan	Umbro	DG FOODS LTD
Wexford	(Republic of Ireland) James Keddy	(Republic of Ireland) Ethan Boyle	Summa Sports	Campion Insurance

=== Managerial changes ===
Team	Outgoing manager	Manner of departure	Date of vacancy	Position in table	Incoming manager	Date of appointment
Waterford	(England) Danny Searle	Sacked	27 March 2023	5th	(Republic of Ireland) Keith Long	29 March 2023
Athlone Town	(Republic of Ireland) Dermot Lennon	Mutual Consent	15 April 2023	5th	(Republic of Ireland) Gordon Brett	15 April 2023
Athlone Town	(Republic of Ireland) Gordon Brett	Change of Role	15 May 2023	5th	(United States) Emilio Williams	19 May 2023
Finn Harps	(England) Dave Rogers	Mutual Consent	23 September 2023	9th	(Northern Ireland) Darren Murphy	27 September 2023

== League table ==
Pos	Team	Pld	W	D	L	GF	GA	GD	Pts	Promotion or qualification
1	Galway United (C, P)	36	30	4	2	98	18	+80	94	Promotion to League of Ireland Premier Division
2	Waterford (O, P)	36	20	9	7	84	32	+52	69	Qualification for League of Ireland Premier Division play-off
3	Cobh Ramblers	36	16	11	9	61	51	+10	59	Qualification for League of Ireland Premier Division play-off
4	Wexford	36	15	8	13	48	49	−1	53	Qualification for League of Ireland Premier Division play-off
5	Athlone Town	36	14	5	17	55	61	−6	47	Qualification for League of Ireland Premier Division play-off
6	Treaty United	36	12	8	16	49	61	−12	44	
7	Bray Wanderers	36	10	14	12	48	62	−14	44	
8	Longford Town	36	10	10	16	39	51	−12	40	
9	Finn Harps	36	9	10	17	39	74	−35	37	
10	Kerry	36	1	7	28	29	91	−62	10	

Source: SSE Airtricity League of Ireland First Division
Rules for classification: 1) Points; 2) Goal difference; 3) Goals scored
(C) Champions; (O) Play-off winners; (P) Promoted

== Season statistics ==
=== Top scorers ===
Rank	Player	Club	Goals
1	(Republic of Ireland) Ronan Coughlan	Waterford	33
2	(Republic of Ireland) David Hurley	Galway United	21
3	(Haiti) Frantz Pierrot	Athlone Town	20
4	(Republic of Ireland) Stephen Walsh	Galway United	14
5	(Republic of Ireland) Aaron Dobbs	Wexford F.C.	13
5	(Republic of Ireland) Jack Doherty	Cobh Ramblers	13
7	(Republic of Ireland) Enda Curran	Treaty United	12
8	(Republic of Ireland) Wilson Waweru	Cobh Ramblers	11
9	(Ukraine) Valerii Dolia	Athlone Town	10
9	(Republic of Ireland) Roland Idowu	Waterford F.C.	10
9	(Romania) Cristian Măgerușan	Longford Town	10

== League of Ireland Premier Division play-off ==
=== Bracket ===
Quarter-finals
2	Waterford	1	3	4
5	Athlone Town	1	1	2
3	Cobh Ramblers	1	1	2
4	Wexford	0	1	1

Semi-finals
2	Waterford	2
3	Cobh Ramblers	1

Final
Waterford	2
Cork City	1

=== Quarter-finals ===
==== First leg ====
24 October 2023	Athlone Town	1–1	Waterford	Athlone
19:45 IST	Pierrot 78'	Report	Coughlan 52'	Stadium: Athlone Town Stadium; Attendance: 1,597; Referee: Oliver Moran

24 October 2023	Wexford	0–1	Cobh Ramblers	Wexford
19:45 IST		Report	O'Malley 15' (o.g.)	Stadium: Ferrycarrig Park; Attendance: 1,010; Referee: Alan Patchell

==== Second leg ====
28 October 2023	Waterford	3–1 (4–2 agg.)	Athlone Town	Waterford
19:45 IST	Akachukwu 64', 78', 90+4'	Report	Pierrot 71' (pen.)	Stadium: RSC; Attendance: 2,237; Referee: Gavin Colfer

28 October 2023	Cobh Ramblers	1–1 (2–1 agg.)	Wexford	Cobh
19:45 IST	O'Leary 75'	Report	Crawford 35'	Stadium: St. Colman's Park; Referee: Marc Lynch

=== Semi-final ===
4 November 2023	Waterford	2–1 (a.e.t.)	Cobh Ramblers	Cork
17:00 IST	Coughlan 47'; Phillips 100'	Report	McKevitt 88'	Stadium: Turners Cross; Referee: D Dunne

=== Final ===
10 November 2023	Waterford	2–1 (a.e.t.)	Cork City	Dublin
19:45 IST	Parsons 68'; Coughlan 101' (pen.)	Report	Coleman 55'	Stadium: Tallaght Stadium; Referee: D McGraith

== Attendances ==
#	Club	Average
1	Galway United	2,012
2	Waterford	1,878
3	Finn Harps	1,135
4	Cobh Ramblers	1,003
5	Athlone Town	872
6	Kerry	782
7	Wexford	693
8	Longford Town	684
9	Bray	681
10	Treaty United	642

== See also ==
- 2023 League of Ireland Premier Division
- 2023 FAI Cup
