= Kerry F.C. (Ireland) =

Irish association football club

Coordinates: 52.28338°N 9.71576°W

- Full name: Kerry Football Club
- Founded: 2022; 4 years ago
- Ground: Mounthawk Park
- Capacity: 1,200
- Chairperson: John Wall
- Manager: Colin Healy
- League: League of Ireland First Division
- 2026: League of Ireland First Division, 4th of 10
- Website: kerryfc.com
Home colours	Away colours

Kerry Football Club is an Irish association football club based in Tralee, County Kerry. It plays its home matches at Mounthawk Park.

The club competes in the League of Ireland First Division, starting in the 2023 season, with an inaugural fixture against Cobh Ramblers.

== History ==
=== Early days ===
Participation from County Kerry in the League of Ireland began when a team representing the Kerry District League (KDL) participated in the Eircom U21 League in 2002 and 2003, while Tralee Dynamos subsequently played in the third-tier A Championship between 2009 and 2011. Following the folding of the A Championship in 2011, Tralee Dynamos submitted an application for a licence to compete in the League of Ireland First Division for the 2012 season. However, their application was unsuccessful.

=== Underage leagues ===
The KDL resumed participation with the League of Ireland at underage level in the late 2010s, joining the Southern Elite Division of the Under-17 League in 2016 and subsequently that of the Under-19 League in 2019.

=== Senior side ===
It was announced on 22 June 2022 that an application had been made by Kerry Football Club, an entity comprising the KDL and a consortium led by Brian Ainscough, Steven Conway and Billy Dennehy, for a licence to compete in the League of Ireland for the 2023 season. The application was deemed successful on 16 November, when Kerry were awarded a licence for the First Division. The club would operate on a fully amateur basis for the 2023 season, and play their games at Mounthawk Park. Dennehy was announced as the club's first manager on 19 December. Later that same day, Treaty United midfielder Matt Keane was announced as the club's first signing, followed by Seán McGrath from Cobh Ramblers.

The club's first ever competitive senior fixture took place on 17 February 2023, a 2–0 home defeat against Cobh Ramblers at Mounthawk Park. The following week, Leo Gaxha scored the club's first ever senior goal, in a 3–1 defeat against Bray Wanderers at the Carlisle Grounds. Kerry secured their first point in the League of Ireland on 3 March, following a 1–1 draw with Treaty United at Mounthawk Park. Figures released upon the completion of the first series of First Division fixtures showed that Kerry had an average home attendance of 1,194, placing them fifth out of the ten clubs in the division, with all four home matches selling out. Kerry secured their first-ever win in the League of Ireland at the fourteenth attempt, with a 3–2 victory away to Athlone Town on 12 May, before recording their first-ever clean sheet on 2 June, following a scoreless draw with Finn Harps at Finn Park. On 17 November 2023, it was announced that Billy Dennehy had stepped down as manager to return to his original position of Sporting Director, with Conor McCarthy taking over as manager. On 24 November 2023, Brian Ainscough departed the club to take over ownership of Dundalk, pulling his funding in Kerry after one year with the club.

The club qualified for the 2023-24 Munster Senior Cup final but lost to Waterford. At the end of the 2024 league season, the club finished bottom of the First Division. In December 2024, businessman John Wall took a controlling interest in the club.

On 29 July 2025, Kerry announced the departure of first-team players Mathyas Randriamamy, a Madagascar international goalkeeper, and Zimbabwe international Shane Maroodza, who had signed for the club just five days previously and made one appearance, while Randriamamy had made 4 after signing at the start of the year. The announcement on the club's Twitter page stated that "their values and principles didn’t match the standards of the club".

On 15 August 2025, Kerry reached the quarter final stages of the FAI Cup for the first time. In the quarter final, held on 12 September 2025, the club pulled-off a significant comeback, as they came from 3 goals down to win 4–3 after extra time at home to Sligo Rovers (their first ever win over League of Ireland Premier Division opposition). They played Shamrock Rovers in the 2025 FAI Cup semi-final on 5 October. Around 1,000 travelling Kerry supporters made the journey to Tallaght Stadium where Kerry lost the match 6-1.

In the 2026 season, Kerry finished their highest ever in the league with a 4th place finish, but lost both fixtures in their semi-final tie with Bray, scoring only a single goal.

== First team squad ==
As of 31 July 2026

Note: Flags indicate national team as defined under FIFA eligibility rules; some limited exceptions apply. Players may hold more than one non-FIFA nationality.

No.	Pos.	Nation	Player
1	GK	IRL	Matthew Connor
2	DF	IRL	Finn Barrett
3	DF	IRL	Sean O'Connell
7	MF	IRL	Seán McGrath
8	MF	LIE	Simon Lüchinger (on loan from Schwarz-Weiß Bregenz)
9	FW	IRL	Ryan Kelliher
10	FW	IRL	Cian Murphy
11	FW	IRL	Daniel Okwute
14	DF	FIN	Jonas Häkkinen
17	FW	IRL	Cian Brosnan
18	DF	IRL	Samuel Aladesanusi
19	FW	IRL	Brandon Bermingham
21	FW	IRL	Luke Palmer

No.	Pos.	Nation	Player
22	DF	IRL	Oran Horgan
23	MF	IRL	Ryan Perez
24	MF	USA	Vincent Borden
26	FW	IRL	Matthew Britton (on loan from Shamrock Rovers)
27	FW	IRL	Luke Doolan
28	MF	ENG	Niall Brookwell
29	DF	IRL	Ewan Lee
31	MF	IRL	Robert Keane
32	MF	IRL	Shayne Stack
35	MF	IRL	Arran Healy
41	FW	IRL	Cian Bargary
44	GK	IRL	Harry Halwax

== Technical staff ==
As of December 2025

Position	Name
Manager	Colin Healy
Assistant Manager	Chris Collopy
First Team Coach	Conor McCarthy
Goalkeeper Coach	Michael O'Connor

== Managerial history ==
Dates	Name
2023	(Republic of Ireland) Billy Dennehy
2024–2025	(Republic of Ireland) Conor McCarthy
2025–	(Republic of Ireland) Colin Healy

== Women's team ==
In June 2023, Kerry FC announced the establishment of a women's football club, via acceptance into the EA Sports LOI Academy WU17's league for the 2024 season.
