= Athlone Town Stadium =

Sport venue in Athlone, Republic of Ireland

Coordinates: 53°25′39″N 7°55′9″W

- Lissywollen
- Location: Lissywollen, Athlone
- Capacity: 3,000 (2,024 seated)
- Surface: Artificial turf
- Public transit: Athlone railway station

Construction
- Built: 2007
- Opened: 2007

Tenant
- Athlone Town (2007–Present)

Athlone Town Stadium, often referred to as Lissywollen (Irish: Lios Uí Mhulláin) is the home stadium of Athlone Town. It has a seating capacity of 2,024 and an overall capacity of 3,000. The stadium was built in 2007, replacing St Mel's Park as the home of the club.

In November 2011, it was reported that Athlone Town had received a donation of €500,000 to wipe out debts incurred through the construction of the stadium.

In 2018, a dispute over ownership of Athlone Town Stadium arose between the club and local businessman Declan Molloy.

In August 2017, the club secured permission to drawdown grant funding for an artificial turf surface. The new pitch was installed ahead of the 2019 season.
