= List of 2022–23 League of Ireland transfers =

This is a list of transfers involving clubs that played in the League of Ireland Premier Division and League of Ireland First Division.

== Pre-Season Transfers ==
=== Bohemians ===
In: Note: Flags indicate national team as defined under FIFA eligibility rules; some limited exceptions apply. Players may hold more than one non-FIFA nationality.

No.	Pos.	Nation	Player
2	DF	IRL	Cian Byrne (Promoted)
6	DF	IRL	Paddy Kirk (from Sligo Rovers)
11	FW	ENG	James Akintunde (from Derry City)
12	MF	IRL	Dylan Connolly (from (England) Morecambe)
18	MF	IRL	Adam McDonnell (from Sligo Rovers)
22	FW	IRL	Dean Williams (from Drogheda United)
24	DF	ENG	Grant Horton (on loan from (England) Cheltenham Town)
25	GK	USA	Luke Dennison (from Longford Town)
—	DF	ENG	Drew Baker (on loan from (England) Fleetwood Town)
—	DF	ENG	Jay Benn (on loan from (England) Lincoln City)
—	DF	POL	Kacper Radkowski (on loan from (Poland) Śląsk Wrocław)

Out: Note: Flags indicate national team as defined under FIFA eligibility rules; some limited exceptions apply. Players may hold more than one non-FIFA nationality.

No.	Pos.	Nation	Player
4	DF	IRL	Rory Feely (to (England) Barrow)
5	MF	IRL	Ciaran Kelly (to (England) Bradford City)
18	FW	IRL	Ethon Varian (on loan to Cork City)
22	MF	IRL	Jamie Mullins (to (England) Brighton & Hove Albion)
25	GK	IRL	Tadgh Ryan (to Derry City)
—	DF	IRL	Ryan Burke (to Waterford)
—	DF	IRL	James Finnerty (to Sligo Rovers, previously on loan at Galway United)
—	DF	IRL	Max Murphy (to Bray Wanderers)
—	DF	IRL	Gavin O'Brien (to Longford Town)
—	DF	IRL	Tyreke Wilson (to Shelbourne)
—	MF	SCO	Liam Burt (to Shamrock Rovers)

=== Cork City ===
In: Note: Flags indicate national team as defined under FIFA eligibility rules; some limited exceptions apply. Players may hold more than one non-FIFA nationality.

No.	Pos.	Nation	Player
1	GK	ENG	Tobi Oluwayemi (on loan from (Scotland) Celtic)
7	FW	BEL	Tunde Owolabi (from St Patrick's Athletic)
14	MF	SWE	Albin Winbo (from (Sweden) Varbergs BoIS)
15	MF	IRL	Matt Healy (on loan from (England) Ipswich Town)
21	FW	IRL	Ethon Varian (on loan from Bohemians)
27	MF	SWE	Kevin Čustović (on loan from (Denmark) Vejle)
—	FW	MKD	Daniel Krezic (from (Sweden) Degerfors)

Out: Note: Flags indicate national team as defined under FIFA eligibility rules; some limited exceptions apply. Players may hold more than one non-FIFA nationality.

No.	Pos.	Nation	Player
—	GK	IRL	David Harrington (to (England) Fleetwood Town)
—	DF	IRL	Mark Carey (to Kerry)
—	DF	IRL	Ciaran Hodanu (to Longford Town)
—	DF	IRL	Charlie O'Brien (to Cobh Ramblers)
—	MF	IRL	Leon Ayinde (to (England) Ipswich Town)
—	MF	IRL	James Doona (to Longford Town)
—	FW	IRL	Kennedy Amechi (to Kerry)
—	FW	IRL	Mark O'Mahoney (to (England) Brighton & Hove Albion)
—	FW	IRL	Franco Umeh-Chibueze (to (England) Crystal Palace)

=== Derry City ===
In: Note: Flags indicate national team as defined under FIFA eligibility rules; some limited exceptions apply. Players may hold more than one non-FIFA nationality.

No.	Pos.	Nation	Player
11	MF	NIR	Ben Doherty (from (Northern Ireland) Larne)
28	MF	IRL	Adam O'Reilly (from (England) Preston North End, previously on loan at St Patrick's Athletic)
—	GK	IRL	Tadgh Ryan (from Bohemians)
—	DF	IRL	Conor Barr (Promoted)
—	MF	IRL	Callum McCay (Promoted)
—	FW	IRL	Colm Whelan (from UCD)

Out: Note: Flags indicate national team as defined under FIFA eligibility rules; some limited exceptions apply. Players may hold more than one non-FIFA nationality.

No.	Pos.	Nation	Player
—	DF	NIR	Daniel Lafferty (to Sligo Rovers)
—	DF	IRL	Daithi McCallion (on loan to Finn Harps)
—	DF	IRL	Caoimhín Porter (on loan to Finn Harps)
—	FW	ENG	James Akintunde (to Bohemians)
—	FW	SCO	Matty Smith (to Shelbourne, previously on loan)

=== Drogheda United ===
In: Note: Flags indicate national team as defined under FIFA eligibility rules; some limited exceptions apply. Players may hold more than one non-FIFA nationality.

No.	Pos.	Nation	Player
2	MF	ENG	Elicha Ahui (on loan from (England) Lincoln City)
4	DF	IRL	Ben Curtis (from St Patrick's Athletic)
5	DF	IRL	Conor Keeley (from (Northern Ireland) Ballymena United)
6	DF	IRL	Emmanuel Adegboyega (from Dundalk)
9	FW	ENG	Freddie Draper (on loan from (England) Lincoln City)
17	DF	IRL	Jarlath Jones (from Athlone Town)
18	MF	IRL	Seán Brennan (from UCD)
20	DF	TUR	Emre Topçu (Promoted)
22	FW	IRL	Aaron McNally (from (United States) Brazos Valley Cavalry)
29	FW	IRL	Michael Leddy (on loan from Shamrock Rovers)
41	MF	IRL	Fiachra Pagel (on loan from (England) Forest Green Rovers)

Out: Note: Flags indicate national team as defined under FIFA eligibility rules; some limited exceptions apply. Players may hold more than one non-FIFA nationality.

No.	Pos.	Nation	Player
41	MF	IRL	Fiachra Pagel (to (England) Forest Green Rovers)
—	GK	IRL	Lee Steacy (to Cobh Ramblers)
—	DF	IRL	Keith Cowan (to Finn Harps)
—	DF	IRL	Dane Massey (to Bray Wanderers)
—	DF	IRL	Andrew Quinn (to Shelbourne)
—	FW	IRL	Chris Lyons (to Bray Wanderers)
—	FW	IRL	Dean Williams (to Bohemians)

=== Dundalk ===
In: Note: Flags indicate national team as defined under FIFA eligibility rules; some limited exceptions apply. Players may hold more than one non-FIFA nationality.

No.	Pos.	Nation	Player
2	DF	ENG	Archie Davies (from (England) Aldershot Town)
5	DF	GIB	Louie Annesley (from (England) Blackburn Rovers)
14	FW	SCO	Cameron Elliott (from (Scotland) East Kilbride)
15	DF	ENG	Hayden Muller (from (England) Millwall)
27	MF	ENG	Connor Malley (from (England) Rochdale)

Out: Note: Flags indicate national team as defined under FIFA eligibility rules; some limited exceptions apply. Players may hold more than one non-FIFA nationality.

No.	Pos.	Nation	Player
2	DF	SCO	Lewis Macari (loan return to (England) Stoke City)
3	DF	IRL	Brian Gartland (Retired)
16	MF	SCO	Steven Bradley (loan return to (Scotland) Hibernian)
22	MF	NOR	Runar Hauge (loan return to (Scotland) Hibernian)
29	FW	IRL	David McMillan (Released)
—	GK	IRL	Jack Harrington (to Longford Town)
—	DF	IRL	Emmanuel Adegboyega (to Drogheda United)

=== Shamrock Rovers ===
In: Note: Flags indicate national team as defined under FIFA eligibility rules; some limited exceptions apply. Players may hold more than one non-FIFA nationality.

No.	Pos.	Nation	Player
18	DF	IRL	Trevor Clarke (on loan from (England) Bristol Rovers)
19	MF	EST	Markus Poom (on loan from (Estonia) Flora)
24	FW	IRL	Johnny Kenny (on loan from (Scotland) Celtic)
27	MF	SCO	Liam Burt (from Bohemians)
—	MF	UKR	Viktor Serdenyuk (from (Ukraine) Balkany Zorya)

Out: Note: Flags indicate national team as defined under FIFA eligibility rules; some limited exceptions apply. Players may hold more than one non-FIFA nationality.

No.	Pos.	Nation	Player
—	DF	IRL	Barry Cotter (to (England) Barnsley)
—	DF	IRL	Oisín Hand (to Longford Town)
—	MF	UKR	Viktor Serdenyuk (to Longford Town)
—	MF	IRL	Aidomo Emakhu (to (England) Millwall)
—	MF	IRL	Andy Lyons (to (England) Blackpool)
—	MF	IRL	Dean McMenamy (to Waterford, previously on loan at Longford Town)
—	FW	IRL	Michael Leddy (on loan to Drogheda United)

=== Shelbourne ===
In: Note: Flags indicate national team as defined under FIFA eligibility rules; some limited exceptions apply. Players may hold more than one non-FIFA nationality.

No.	Pos.	Nation	Player
15	FW	SCO	Matty Smith (from Derry City, previously on loan)
22	MF	IRL	Gavin Hodgins (Promoted)
36	DF	IRL	Lewis Temple (Promoted)
—	GK	IRL	Conor Kearns (from Galway United)
—	DF	IRL	Paddy Barrett (from St Patrick's Athletic)
—	DF	IRL	Lukas Browne (Promoted)
—	DF	IRL	Andrew Quinn (from Drogheda United)
—	DF	IRL	Tyreke Wilson (from Bohemians)
—	MF	IRL	Evan Caffrey (from UCD)
—	MF	IRL	Kian Leavy (on loan from (England) Reading)
—	FW	IRL	Kyle Robinson (from St Patrick's Athletic)

Out: Note: Flags indicate national team as defined under FIFA eligibility rules; some limited exceptions apply. Players may hold more than one non-FIFA nationality.

No.	Pos.	Nation	Player
11	FW	WAL	Dan Hawkins (Released)
—	GK	IRL	Brendan Clarke (to Galway United)
—	DF	IRL	Aaron O'Driscoll (Released)
—	MF	IRL	Josh Giurgi (to Longford Town)
—	MF	IRL	Stephan Negru (to (England) Oxford United)
—	FW	IRL	Kyle O'Connor (to Longford Town)
—	FW	IRL	Francis Campbell (to Longford Town)
—	FW	TTO	Daniel Carr (Released)
—	FW	IRL	Jamal Ibrahim (to Longford Town)

=== Sligo Rovers ===
In: Note: Flags indicate national team as defined under FIFA eligibility rules; some limited exceptions apply. Players may hold more than one non-FIFA nationality.

No.	Pos.	Nation	Player
2	MF	SWE	Johan Brannefalk (from (Sweden) Norrby)
3	DF	NIR	Daniel Lafferty (from Derry City)
4	DF	ENG	Reece Hutchinson (on loan from (England) Cheltenham Town)
5	DF	IRL	James Finnerty (from Bohemians, previously on loan at Galway United)
16	DF	IRL	Gary Boylan (from Galway United)
18	FW	FRO	Stefan Radosavljevic (from (Faroe Islands) HB Tórshavn)
19	MF	SWE	Lukas Browning Lagerfeldt (from (Sweden) Dalkurd)
21	DF	IRL	Josh Mahon (from (Scotland) St Johnstone)
28	MF	NZL	Nando Pijnaker (from (Portugal) Rio Ave)
59	MF	EST	Bogdan Vaštšuk (from (Poland) Stal Mielec)

Out: Note: Flags indicate national team as defined under FIFA eligibility rules; some limited exceptions apply. Players may hold more than one non-FIFA nationality.

No.	Pos.	Nation	Player
—	DF	IRL	Shane Blaney (to (Scotland) Motherwell)
—	DF	IRL	Colm Horgan (to Galway United)
—	DF	IRL	Paddy Kirk (to Bohemians)
—	MF	IRL	Adam McDonnell (to Bohemians)
—	FW	IRL	Aidan Keena (to (England) Cheltenham Town)
—	FW	IRL	Séamas Keogh (to Finn Harps)

=== St Patrick's Athletic ===
In: Note: Flags indicate national team as defined under FIFA eligibility rules; some limited exceptions apply. Players may hold more than one non-FIFA nationality.

No.	Pos.	Nation	Player
2	DF	NED	Noah Lewis (from (Netherlands) Willem II)
10	FW	IRL	Tommy Lonergan (from UCD)
15	FW	IRL	Conor Carty (on loan from (England) Bolton Wanderers)
17	MF	EST	Vladislav Kreida (on loan from (Estonia) Flora)
20	MF	IRL	Jake Mulraney (from (United States) Orlando City)

Out: Note: Flags indicate national team as defined under FIFA eligibility rules; some limited exceptions apply. Players may hold more than one non-FIFA nationality.

No.	Pos.	Nation	Player
15	MF	SCO	Billy King (to (United States) Northern Colorado Hailstorm)
16	MF	IRL	Adam O'Reilly (loan return to (England) Preston North End, later sold to Derry City)
24	DF	IRL	Ben Curtis (to Drogheda United)
29	DF	IRL	Paddy Barrett (to Shelbourne)
30	MF	IRL	Ross Fay (to Longford Town)
33	FW	IRL	Kyle Robinson (to Shelbourne)
45	FW	BEL	Tunde Owolabi (to Cork City)
—	FW	IRL	Ronan Coughlan (to Waterford)

=== UCD ===
In: Note: Flags indicate national team as defined under FIFA eligibility rules; some limited exceptions apply. Players may hold more than one non-FIFA nationality.

No.	Pos.	Nation	Player

Out: Note: Flags indicate national team as defined under FIFA eligibility rules; some limited exceptions apply. Players may hold more than one non-FIFA nationality.

No.	Pos.	Nation	Player
—	MF	IRL	Seán Brennan (to Drogheda United)
—	MF	IRL	Evan Caffrey (to Shelbourne)
—	FW	IRL	Dylan Duffy (to (England) Lincoln City)
—	FW	IRL	Tommy Lonergan (to St Patrick's Athletic)
—	FW	IRL	Colm Whelan (to Derry City)

== First Division ==
=== Athlone Town ===
In: Note: Flags indicate national team as defined under FIFA eligibility rules; some limited exceptions apply. Players may hold more than one non-FIFA nationality.

No.	Pos.	Nation	Player

Out: Note: Flags indicate national team as defined under FIFA eligibility rules; some limited exceptions apply. Players may hold more than one non-FIFA nationality.

No.	Pos.	Nation	Player
—	DF	IRL	Jarlath Jones (to Drogheda United)
—	DF	IRL	Andrew Spain (to Treaty United)
—	FW	IRL	Stephen Meaney (to Longford Town)
—	FW	IRL	Thomas Oluwa (to Waterford)

=== Bray Wanderers ===
In: Note: Flags indicate national team as defined under FIFA eligibility rules; some limited exceptions apply. Players may hold more than one non-FIFA nationality.

No.	Pos.	Nation	Player
—	GK	IRL	Alex Moody (from Wexford)
—	DF	IRL	Luka Lovic (from Wexford)
—	DF	IRL	Dane Massey (from Drogheda United)
—	DF	IRL	Max Murphy (from Bohemians)
—	DF	IRL	Len O'Sullivan (from Wexford)
—	DF	IRL	David Webster (from Finn Harps)
—	MF	IRL	Darren Craven (from Longford Town)
—	MF	IRL	Eoin Farrell (from Wexford)
—	MF	IRL	Harry Groome (from Wexford)
—	FW	IRL	Conor Crowley (from Wexford)
—	FW	IRL	Conor Davis (from Wexford)
—	FW	IRL	Chris Lyons (from Drogheda United)
—	FW	IRL	Ger Shortt (from Wexford)
—	FW	IRL	Jake Walker (from Crumlin United)

Out: Note: Flags indicate national team as defined under FIFA eligibility rules; some limited exceptions apply. Players may hold more than one non-FIFA nationality.

No.	Pos.	Nation	Player
—	DF	IRL	Conor McManus (to (England) Brentford)
—	FW	IRL	Colin Kelly (to Treaty United)
—	FW	IRL	Darragh Lynch (to Longford Town)

=== Cobh Ramblers ===
In: Note: Flags indicate national team as defined under FIFA eligibility rules; some limited exceptions apply. Players may hold more than one non-FIFA nationality.

No.	Pos.	Nation	Player
25	DF	IRL	Michael McCarthy (Promoted)
—	GK	IRL	Lee Steacy (from Drogheda United)
—	DF	IRL	Cian Browne (from Waterford)
—	DF	IRL	Charlie Lyons (from Galway United)
—	DF	IRL	Charlie O'Brien (from Cork City)
—	MF	IRL	Jack Doherty (from Wexford)
—	FW	IRL	Callum Stringer (from Waterford)
—	FW	IRL	Wilson Waweru (on loan from Galway United)

Out: Note: Flags indicate national team as defined under FIFA eligibility rules; some limited exceptions apply. Players may hold more than one non-FIFA nationality.

No.	Pos.	Nation	Player
—	MF	IRL	Seán McGrath (to Kerry)

=== Finn Harps ===
In: Note: Flags indicate national team as defined under FIFA eligibility rules; some limited exceptions apply. Players may hold more than one non-FIFA nationality.

No.	Pos.	Nation	Player
20	MF	IRL	Sean O'Donnell (Promoted)
—	GK	GER	Tim-Oliver Hiemer (Free Agent)
—	DF	IRL	Keith Cowan (from Drogheda United)
—	DF	ENG	Ellis Farrar (on loan from (England) Stockport County)
—	DF	USA	Ryan Flood (from (United States) Phoenix Rising)
—	DF	IRL	Kevin Jordan (Promoted)
—	DF	IRL	Daithi McCallion (on loan from Derry City)
—	DF	IRL	Shane McMonagle (from Aileach)
—	DF	IRL	Caoimhín Porter (on loan from Derry City)
—	MF	RSA	Katlego Mashigo (from (Northern Ireland) Portadown)
—	MF	IRL	Brendan McLaughlin (Promoted)
—	FW	IRL	Shaunie Bradley (Promoted)
—	FW	BRA	Filip Da Silva (from (Norway) Ull/Kisa)
—	FW	IRL	Michael Harris (from (United States) Colorado Rapids 2)
—	FW	IRL	Séamas Keogh (from Sligo Rovers)
—	FW	IRL	Daniel Okwute (on loan from (England) Stockport County)

Out: Note: Flags indicate national team as defined under FIFA eligibility rules; some limited exceptions apply. Players may hold more than one non-FIFA nationality.

No.	Pos.	Nation	Player
—	DF	IRL	Regan Donelon (to Galway United)
—	DF	IRL	Rob Slevin (to Galway United)
—	DF	IRL	David Webster (to Bray Wanderers)
—	MF	IRL	Ryan Connolly (to Treaty United)

=== Galway United ===
In: Note: Flags indicate national team as defined under FIFA eligibility rules; some limited exceptions apply. Players may hold more than one non-FIFA nationality.

No.	Pos.	Nation	Player
—	GK	IRL	Brendan Clarke (from Shelbourne)
—	GK	ENG	Alex Rutter (from (Australia) Hume City)
—	DF	IRL	Regan Donelon (from Finn Harps)
—	DF	IRL	Colm Horgan (from Sligo Rovers)
—	DF	IRL	Rob Slevin (from Finn Harps)
—	MF	USA	Vincent Borden (from (Slovenia) Rudar Velenje)
—	MF	IRL	Darren Clarke (from Longford Town)
—	MF	IRL	Callum McNamara (from Treaty United)
—	MF	IRL	Maurice Nugent (from (England) Uxbridge)
—	FW	FRA	Ibrahim Keita (from (Czech Republic) Bohemians 1905)

Out: Note: Flags indicate national team as defined under FIFA eligibility rules; some limited exceptions apply. Players may hold more than one non-FIFA nationality.

No.	Pos.	Nation	Player
18	FW	IRL	Wilson Waweru (on loan to Cobh Ramblers)
—	GK	IRL	Matthew Connor (to Waterford)
—	GK	IRL	Conor Kearns (to Shelbourne)
—	DF	IRL	Gary Boylan (to Sligo Rovers)
—	DF	IRL	Charlie Lyons (to Cobh Ramblers)

=== Kerry ===
In: Note: Flags indicate national team as defined under FIFA eligibility rules; some limited exceptions apply. Players may hold more than one non-FIFA nationality.

No.	Pos.	Nation	Player
1	GK	IRL	Wayne Guthrie (Free Agent)
2	DF	IRL	Rob Vasiu (Promoted)
3	DF	IRL	Sean O'Connell (Promoted)
4	DF	IRL	Shane Guthrie (from Tralee Dynamos)
5	DF	IRL	Kalen Spillane (from Carrigaline United)
6	MF	USA	Alex Ainscough (from (United States) Flower City Union)
7	MF	IRL	Seán McGrath (from Cobh Ramblers)
8	MF	IRL	Matt Keane (from Treaty United)
9	FW	IRL	Ryan Kelliher (from Killarney Celtic)
10	FW	IRL	Leo Gaxha (from (England) Sheffield United)
11	MF	IRL	Seán Kennedy (Free Agent)
12	MF	IRL	Cianan Cooney (Promoted)
13	MF	IRL	Togor Silong (Promoted)
14	MF	IRL	Andy Quaid (from Regional United)
15	DF	IRL	Kevin Williams (from (Germany) Union Fürstenwald)
16	GK	IRL	Callan Scully (from UCC)
17	MF	IRL	Nathan Glleson (Promoted)
18	DF	IRL	Samuel Aladesanusi (Promoted)
19	DF	IRL	Cormac Bucley (Promoted)
20	FW	CRO	Trpimir Vrljicak (from Killarney Celtic)
21	MF	IRL	Junior Ankomah (Promoted)
23	MF	IRL	Ronan Teahan (Promoted)
24	DF	IRL	Jonathan Hannafin (from Mervue United)
25	DF	IRL	Mark Carey (from Cork City)
26	FW	IRL	Stephen McCarthy (from Killarney Celtic)
27	DF	IRL	Graham O'Reilly (Promoted)
28	FW	IRL	Cian Brosnan (Promoted)
29	FW	IRL	Kennedy Amechi (from Cork City)
30	GK	IRL	Aaron O'Sullivan (Promoted)

Out: Note: Flags indicate national team as defined under FIFA eligibility rules; some limited exceptions apply. Players may hold more than one non-FIFA nationality.

No.	Pos.	Nation	Player
—	MF	IRL	Daniel Okwute (to (England) Stockport County)

=== Longford Town ===
In: Note: Flags indicate national team as defined under FIFA eligibility rules; some limited exceptions apply. Players may hold more than one non-FIFA nationality.

No.	Pos.	Nation	Player
—	GK	IRL	Jack Brady (from Treaty United)
—	GK	IRL	Jack Harrington (from Dundalk)
—	DF	IRL	Derek Daly (from (Northern Ireland) Crumlin United)
—	DF	IRL	Evan Farrell (from Bangor Celtic)
—	DF	IRL	Oisín Hand (from Shamrock Rovers)
—	DF	IRL	Ciaran Hodanu (from Cork City)
—	DF	IRL	Gavin O'Brien (from Bohemians)
—	DF	IRL	Aaron Walsh (from (Northern Ireland) Loughgall)
—	MF	IRL	James Doona (from Cork City)
—	MF	IRL	Ross Fay (from St Patrick's Athletic)
—	MF	IRL	Josh Giurgi (from Shelbourne)
—	FW	IRL	Kyle O'Connor (from Shelbourne)
—	MF	UKR	Viktor Serdenyuk (from Shamrock Rovers)
—	FW	IRL	Francis Campbell (from Shelbourne)
—	FW	IRL	Jamal Ibrahim (from Shelbourne)
—	FW	IRL	Darragh Lynch (from Bray Wanderers)
—	FW	IRL	Stephen Meaney (from Athlone Town)

Out: Note: Flags indicate national team as defined under FIFA eligibility rules; some limited exceptions apply. Players may hold more than one non-FIFA nationality.

No.	Pos.	Nation	Player
—	GK	USA	Luke Dennison (to Bohemians)
—	MF	IRL	Darren Clarke (to Galway United)
—	MF	IRL	Darren Craven (to Bray Wanderers)
—	MF	IRL	Dean McMenamy (loan return to Shamrock Rovers, later sold to Waterford)

=== Treaty United ===
In: Note: Flags indicate national team as defined under FIFA eligibility rules; some limited exceptions apply. Players may hold more than one non-FIFA nationality.

No.	Pos.	Nation	Player
29	MF	IRL	Josh Quinlivan (Promoted)
38	DF	IRL	Josh Kirkland (Promoted)
—	GK	IRL	Shane Hallahan (from Cobh Wanderers)
—	DF	IRL	Anthony O'Donnell (from Ringmahon Rangers)
—	DF	IRL	Andrew Spain (from Athlone Town)
—	MF	IRL	Conor Barry (from Wexford)
—	MF	IRL	Ryan Connolly (from Finn Harps)
—	FW	IRL	Colin Kelly (from Bray Wanderers)

Out: Note: Flags indicate national team as defined under FIFA eligibility rules; some limited exceptions apply. Players may hold more than one non-FIFA nationality.

No.	Pos.	Nation	Player
1	GK	IRL	Jack Brady (to Longford Town)
5	DF	IRL	Sean Guerins (Released)
6	MF	IRL	Callum McNamara (to Galway United)
7	MF	IRL	Conor Melody (Released)
8	MF	IRL	Joe Collins (Released)
17	MF	IRL	Joel Coustrain (to Aishling Annacotty)
22	MF	IRL	Matt Keane (to Kerry)
44	DF	IRL	Jack Lynch (Released)
—	MF	IRL	Ryan Connolly (Released)

=== Waterford ===
In: Note: Flags indicate national team as defined under FIFA eligibility rules; some limited exceptions apply. Players may hold more than one non-FIFA nationality.

No.	Pos.	Nation	Player
—	GK	IRL	Matthew Connor (from Galway United)
—	GK	ENG	Tom Donaghy (on loan from (England) Fleetwood Town)
—	DF	IRL	Ryan Burke (from Bohemians)
—	DF	ESP	Charles Ondo (on loan from (England) Huddersfield Town)
—	DF	USA	Giles Phillips (from (England) Aldershot Town)
—	MF	NIR	Barry Baggley (on loan from (England) Fleetwood Town)
—	MF	NIR	Chris Conn-Clarke (on loan from (England) Fleetwood Town)
—	MF	IRL	Dean Larkin (Promoted)
—	MF	IRL	Dean McMenamy (from Shamrock Rovers, previously on loan at Longford Town)
—	MF	ENG	Connor Parsons (from (England) Wycombe Wanderers)
—	FW	IRL	Ronan Coughlan (from St Patrick's Athletic)
—	FW	IRL	Thomas Oluwa (from Athlone Town)

Out: Note: Flags indicate national team as defined under FIFA eligibility rules; some limited exceptions apply. Players may hold more than one non-FIFA nationality.

No.	Pos.	Nation	Player
—	GK	IRL	Brian Murphy (Retired)
—	DF	IRL	Cian Browne (to Cobh Ramblers)
—	DF	ENG	Richard Taylor (to (Scotland) St Mirren)
—	MF	SCO	Phoenix Patterson (to (England) Fleetwood Town)
—	MF	GBS	Junior Quitirna (to (England) Fleetwood Town, later loaned to (England) Altrincham)
—	FW	IRL	Callum Stringer (to Cobh Ramblers)

=== Wexford ===
In: Note: Flags indicate national team as defined under FIFA eligibility rules; some limited exceptions apply. Players may hold more than one non-FIFA nationality.

No.	Pos.	Nation	Player

Out: Note: Flags indicate national team as defined under FIFA eligibility rules; some limited exceptions apply. Players may hold more than one non-FIFA nationality.

No.	Pos.	Nation	Player
—	GK	IRL	Alex Moody (to Bray Wanderers)
—	DF	IRL	Luka Lovic (to Bray Wanderers)
—	DF	IRL	Len O'Sullivan (to Bray Wanderers)
—	MF	IRL	Conor Barry (to Treaty United)
—	MF	IRL	Jack Doherty (to Cobh Ramblers)
—	MF	IRL	Eoin Farrell (to Bray Wanderers)
—	MF	IRL	Harry Groome (to Bray Wanderers)
—	FW	IRL	Conor Crowley (to Bray Wanderers)
—	FW	IRL	Conor Davis (to Bray Wanderers)
—	FW	IRL	Ger Shortt (to Bray Wanderers)
