= 2019 Galway United F.C. season =

Irish football club season

Galway United
2019 season
- Manager: Alan Murphy
- Stadium: Eamonn Deacy Park
- First Division: 7th
- FAI Cup: Quarter-finals
- League of Ireland Cup: Second Round
- Top goalscorer: League: Vinny Faherty (6); All: Conor Barry (8)
- Biggest win: 7–1 v Cobh Ramblers; 23 August 2019 (Home, First Division)
- Biggest defeat: 0–4 v Longford Town; 27 July 2019 (Away, First Division)
Home colours	Away colours

The 2019 Galway United F.C. season was the football club's 41st season in the League of Ireland and their second consecutive season in the League of Ireland First Division since being relegated in 2017.

This was the club's first and only full season under manager Alan Murphy, after he had replaced Shane Keegan halfway through the previous season.

The club finished 7th, 24 points off the play-offs, with the season standing as the club's tied-lowest placed finish in the League of Ireland pyramid. The club made the Quarter-finals of the FAI Cup being the only First Division club to do so, and made it to the Second Round of the League of Ireland Cup.

== Squad ==
#	Name	Nationality	Position	Date of birth (age)	Previous Club	Signed	Notes
Goalkeepers
1	Kevin Horgan	(Republic of Ireland)	GK	April 26, 1997 (aged 22)	(Republic of Ireland) Shamrock Rovers	2019	
16	Cian Mulryan	(Republic of Ireland)	GK	May 3, 2000 (aged 19)	(Republic of Ireland) Mervue United	2019	
25	James Tierney	(Republic of Ireland)	GK	September 4, 1998 (aged 21)	(Republic of Ireland) Pike Rovers	2019	
Defenders
2	Christopher Horgan	(Republic of Ireland)	DF	October 27, 1999 (aged 19)	(Republic of Ireland) Salthill Devon	2018	
3	Marc Ludden	(Republic of Ireland)	DF	February 28, 1990 (aged 29)	(Republic of Ireland) Mervue United	2014	
4	Adam Rooney	(Republic of Ireland)	DF	May 5, 2000 (aged 19)	(Republic of Ireland) Mervue United	2018	
5	Stephen Walsh	(Republic of Ireland)	DF	August 29, 1990 (aged 29)	(Republic of Ireland) Athlone Town	2018	Captain
6	Maurice Nugent	(Republic of Ireland)	DF	July 30, 1998 (aged 21)	(Republic of Ireland) Mervue United	2017	Vice-captain
7	Iarfhlaith Davoren	(Republic of Ireland)	DF	May 12, 1986 (aged 33)	(United States) PSC	2019	player/coach
13	Cian Murphy	(Republic of Ireland)	DF	December 25, 1996 (aged 22)	(Republic of Ireland) St. Mary's	2019	
18	Killian Brouder	(Republic of Ireland)	DF	August 20, 1998 (aged 21)	(Republic of Ireland) Limerick	2019	
19	Jack Lynch	(Republic of Ireland)	DF	February 2, 1998 (aged 21)	(Republic of Ireland) Regional United	2019	
26	Andrew Peters	(Republic of Ireland)	DF	September 2, 1994 (aged 25)	(Republic of Ireland) Claremorris AFC	2019	
Midfielders
8	Conor Melody	(Republic of Ireland)	MF	March 15, 1997 (aged 22)	(Republic of Ireland) Salthill Devon	2015	
10	Conor Barry	(Republic of Ireland)	MF	September 2, 1995 (aged 24)	(Republic of Ireland) Athlone Town	2017	
12	Ronan Asgari	(Republic of Ireland)	MF	July 21, 2000 (aged 19)	(Republic of Ireland) Mervue United	2019	
15	Mark Hannon	(Republic of Ireland)	MF	February 7, 1998 (aged 21)	(Republic of Ireland) Finn Harps	2019	
17	Ivan Gamarra	(Argentina)	MF	February 28, 1996 (aged 23)	(Argentina) PSM Fútbol	2019	
20	Donal Higgins	(Republic of Ireland)	MF	September 10, 2001 (aged 18)	(Republic of Ireland) Maree Oranmore	2018	
21	Joe Collins	(Republic of Ireland)	MF	January 4, 1994 (aged 25)	(Republic of Ireland) West United	2019	
22	Stephen Christopher	(Republic of Ireland)	MF	July 11, 1996 (aged 23)	(Republic of Ireland) Cobh Ramblers	2019	
24	Caoilfhionn O’Dea	(Republic of Ireland)	MF	December 11, 2000 (aged 18)	(Republic of Ireland) Newmarket Celtic	2019	
24	Matthew Barrett	(Republic of Ireland)	MF	May 19, 1999 (aged 20)	(Republic of Ireland) Maree Oranmore	2019	
29	Joshua Keane Quinlivan	(Republic of Ireland)	MF	May 18, 2000 (aged 19)	(Republic of Ireland) Mervue United	2019	
Forwards
9	Vinny Faherty	(Republic of Ireland)	FW	June 13, 1987 (aged 32)	(Cyprus) PAEEK	2019	
11	Colin Kelly	(Republic of Ireland)	FW	November 22, 2001 (aged 17)	(Republic of Ireland) Mervue United	2018	
14	Wilson Waweru	(Republic of Ireland)	FW	December 27, 2000 (aged 18)	(Republic of Ireland) Academy	2018	
23	Dara Costelloe	(Republic of Ireland)	FW	December 11, 2002 (aged 16)	(Republic of Ireland) Aisling Annacotty	2018	
27	Conor Layng	(Republic of Ireland)	FW	May 12, 1999 (aged 20)	(Republic of Ireland) Athlone Town	2018	
Players who departed before the end of the season
16	Andreas Werner	(Germany)	GK	June 13, 1996 (aged 22)	(Andorra) Encamp	2019	
18	Shane Doherty	(United States)	MF	August 16, 1996 (aged 22)	(United States) Rowan	2019	
19	Alan Murphy	(Republic of Ireland)	MF	October 3, 1981 (aged 37)	(Republic of Ireland) West United	2018	player/coach (Note: Murphy stopped playing, however continued as the club's head coach for the entire season)
22	Jeff McGowan	(Republic of Ireland)	FW	February 7, 1998 (aged 21)	(Republic of Ireland) Limerick	2019	

=== In ===
Date	Position	Nationality	Name	Last club	Ref.
23 December 2018	MF	(Republic of Ireland)	Mark Hannon	(Republic of Ireland) Finn Harps	
6 January 2019	FW	(Republic of Ireland)	Vinny Faherty	(Cyprus) PAEEK	
16 January 2019	DF	(Republic of Ireland)	Andrew Peters	(Republic of Ireland) Claremorris AFC	
16 January 2019	FW	(Republic of Ireland)	Jeff McGowan	(Republic of Ireland) Limerick	
21 January 2019	DF	(Republic of Ireland)	Iarfhlaith Davoren	(United States) PSC	
27 January 2019	MF	(Republic of Ireland)	Joe Collins	(Republic of Ireland) West United	
30 January 2019	DF	(Republic of Ireland)	Cian Murphy	(Republic of Ireland) St. Mary's	
3 February 2019	MF	(United States)	Shane Doherty	(United States) Rowan	
6 February 2019	GK	(Republic of Ireland)	James Tierney	(Republic of Ireland) Pike Rovers	
6 February 2019	MF	(Republic of Ireland)	Matthew Barrett	(Republic of Ireland) Maree Oranmore	
10 February 2019	GK	(Republic of Ireland)	Kevin Horgan	(Republic of Ireland) Shamrock Rovers	
3 March 2019	GK	(Germany)	Andreas Werner	(Andorra) Encamp	
3 March 2019	MF	(Argentina)	Ivan Gamarra	(Argentina) PSM Fútbol	
13 June 2019	DF	(Republic of Ireland)	Jack Lynch	(Republic of Ireland) Regional United	
29 July 2019	DF	(Republic of Ireland)	Killian Brouder	(Republic of Ireland) Limerick	
1 August 2019	MF	(Republic of Ireland)	Stephen Christopher	(Republic of Ireland) Cobh Ramblers	

=== Out ===
Date	Position	Nationality	Name	To	Ref.
	GK	(Republic of Ireland)	Connor Gleeson	(Republic of Ireland) Galway GAA	
3 December 2018	GK	(Republic of Ireland)	Tadhg Ryan	(Republic of Ireland) Cork City	
5 December 2018	MF	(Republic of Ireland)	Seán Russell	(Republic of Ireland) Limerick	
11 December 2018	DF	(England)	Robbie Williams	(Republic of Ireland) Limerick	
17 January 2019	MF	(Republic of Ireland)	Ryan Connolly	(Republic of Ireland) Ballyglass	
19 January 2019	MF	(Republic of Ireland)	Ronan Manning	(Republic of Ireland) Athlone Town	

== Club ==
=== Coaching staff ===
- Manager: Alan Murphy
- Assistant Manager: Mark Herrick
- First Team Coach: Kevin Murphy
- First Team Coach: Keith McTigue
- First Team Coach: Danny Broderick
- First Team Coach: Iarfhlaith Davoren
- Goalkeeping Coach: Gianluca Aimi
- Strength and Conditioning Coach: David Mannion
- Physiotherapist: Ronan Coyle
- Head of Physical Performance: Brian McMorrow

== Competitions ==
=== League of Ireland First Division ===
==== League Table ====
Pos	Team	Pld	W	D	L	GF	GA	GD	Pts
5	Bray Wanderers	27	14	4	9	44	26	+18	46
6	Cobh Ramblers	27	8	7	12	38	51	−13	31
7	Galway United	27	7	5	15	36	42	−6	26
8	Athlone Town	27	4	6	17	30	61	−31	18
9	Wexford	27	2	5	20	22	65	−43	11

Source: SSE Airtricity League, Soccerway
Rules for classification: 1) Points; 2) Goal difference; 3) Goals scored.

==== Results summary ====
Overall								Home						Away					
Pld	W	D	L	GF	GA	GD	Pts	W	D	L	GF	GA	GD	W	D	L	GF	GA	GD
27	7	5	15	36	42	−6	26	4	3	7	21	21	0	3	2	8	15	21	−6

==== Matches ====
Win Draw Loss

22 February 2019 1	Galway United	2–3	Shelbourne	Terryland, County Galway
19:45 GMT	Kelly 3'; Faherty 15'	Report	Kilduff 74', 84'; Moore 82'	Stadium: Eamonn Deacy Park; Attendance: 2,174; Referee: Eoghan O'Shea

1 March 2019 2	Wexford	0–4	Galway United	Crossabeg, County Wexford
19:45 GMT	Doyle (red card) 70'	Report	Higgins 25'; Barry 29'; Nugent 62'; Kelly 82'	Stadium: Ferrycarrig Park; Attendance: 242; Referee: Kevin O'Sullivan

8 March 2019 3	Galway United	0–1	Bray Wanderers	Terryland, County Galway
19:45 GMT		Report	O'Halloran 71'	Stadium: Eamonn Deacy Park; Attendance: 1,216; Referee: Eoghan O'Shea

22 March 2019 4	Galway United	0–1	Drogheda United	Terryland, County Galway
19:45 GMT		Report	Doyle 24'	Stadium: Eamonn Deacy Park; Attendance: 803; Referee: Ray Matthews

29 March 2019 5	Cabinteely	1–0	Galway United	Blackrock, Dublin 18
19:45 GMT	Manley 17'	Report		Stadium: Stradbrook Road; Attendance: 434; Referee: Alan Carey

5 April 2019 6	Galway United	0–1	Limerick	Terryland, County Galway
19:45 GMT		Report	McSweeney 30'	Stadium: Eamonn Deacy Park; Attendance: 712; Referee: Garvin Taggart

12 April 2019 7	Galway United	1–2	Cobh Ramblers	Terryland, County Galway
19:45 GMT	Faherty 30' (pen.); Nugent 45' (o.g.)	Report	Kabia 7'	Stadium: Eamonn Deacy Park; Attendance: 670; Referee: Adriano Reale

19 April 2019 8	Athlone Town	0–4	Galway United	Lissywollen, Athlone
19:45 GMT		Report	Murphy 27'; Melody 51'; Faherty 59'; Waweru 68'	Stadium: Athlone Town Stadium; Attendance: 438; Referee: Alan Carey

26 April 2019 9	Shelbourne	3–0	Galway United	Drumcondra, Dublin 3
19:45 GMT	Brennan 50'; Kilduff 85'; Brennan 90+3'	Report	Walsh (yellow card) 61' (yellow-red card) 66'; Costelloe (red card) 63'	Stadium: Tolka Park; Attendance: 902; Referee: Garvin Taggart

3 May 2019 10	Galway United	2–0	Wexford	Terryland, County Galway
19:45 GMT	Barry 28'; Nugent 79'	Report		Stadium: Eamonn Deacy Park; Attendance: 590; Referee: Kevin O'Sullivan

17 May 2019 11	Galway United	2–1	Longford Town	Terryland, County Galway
19:45 GMT	Faherty 48', 85'	Report	Byrne 12'	Stadium: Eamonn Deacy Park; Attendance: 717; Referee: Eoghan O'Shea

20 May 2019 12	Bray Wanderers	2–1	Galway United	Bray, County Wicklow
19:45 GMT	Douglas 56', 86'	Report	Doherty 21'	Stadium: Carlisle Grounds; Attendance: 512; Referee: Alan Carey

24 May 2019 13	Drogheda United	3–0	Galway United	Drogheda, County Louth
19:45 GMT	Lyons 12', 62'; Adeyemo 89'	Report	Melody (red card) 90+3'	Stadium: United Park; Attendance: 798; Referee: Paula Brady

31 May 2019 14	Galway United	0–0	Cabinteely	Terryland, County Galway
19:45 GMT		Report		Stadium: Eamonn Deacy Park; Attendance: 621; Referee: David Keeler

3 June 2019 15	Longford Town	2–1	Galway United	Longford, County Longford
19:45 GMT	Byrne 12'; Verdon 19'	Report	Doherty 55'	Stadium: Bishopsgate; Attendance: 636; Referee: David Dunne

8 June 2019 16	Limerick	2–1	Galway United	Garryowen, Limerick
19:45 GMT	Devitt 51'; Hanlon 59'	Report	Doherty 33'	Stadium: Markets Field; Attendance: 435; Referee: Ray Matthews

14 June 2019 17	Cobh Ramblers	2–1	Galway United	Cobh, County Cork
19:45 GMT	Fernandes 33'; Kabia 59'	Report	Walsh 69'	Stadium: St Colman's Park; Attendance: 321; Referee: Paula Brady

28 June 2019 18	Galway United	1–1	Athlone Town	Terryland, County Galway
19:45 GMT	Waweru 30'	Report	Williams 65' (pen.)	Stadium: Eamonn Deacy Park; Attendance: 621; Referee: Garvin Taggart

5 July 2019 19	Galway United	0–3	Athlone Town	Terryland, County Galway
19:45 GMT		Report	Farrell 2'; English 12', 44'	Stadium: Eamonn Deacy Park; Attendance: 876; Referee: Alan Carey

12 July 2019 20	Wexford	0–0	Galway United	Crossabeg, County Wexford
19:45 GMT		Report		Stadium: Ferrycarrig Park; Attendance: 205; Referee: Kevin O'Sullivan

19 July 2019 21	Galway United	2–2	Bray Wanderers	Terryland, County Galway
19:45 GMT	Horgan 7' (o.g.); Layng 45'; Faherty 84'	Report	McGlade 50'	Stadium: Eamonn Deacy Park; Attendance: 517; Referee: Michael Connolly

27 July 2019 22	Longford Town	4–0	Galway United	Longford, County Longford
19:45 GMT	Byrne 68', 83'; Boyd 71'; Manley 90+3'	Report		Stadium: Bishopsgate; Attendance: 442; Referee: Paula Brady

2 August 2019 23	Galway United	1–3	Drogheda United	Terryland, County Galway
19:45 GMT	Ludden 50'	Report	McNally 19'; Lyons 22'; Meaney 29'	Stadium: Eamonn Deacy Park; Attendance: 612; Referee: Ray Matthews

16 August 2019 24	Cabinteely	0–1	Galway United	Blackrock, Dublin 18
19:45 GMT		Report	Barry 19'	Stadium: Stradbrook Road; Attendance: 204; Referee: Alan Patchell

23 August 2019 25	Galway United	7–1	Cobh Ramblers	Terryland, County Galway
19:45 GMT	Walsh 48'; Ludden 52', 54', 80', 88'; Barry 65'; Melody 77'	Report	Leonard 25'; O'Leary (red card) 33'; Taylor (red card) 57'	Stadium: Eamonn Deacy Park; Attendance: 456; Referee: Eoghan O'Shea

16 September 2019 26	Galway United	3–2	Limerick	Terryland, County Galway
19:45 GMT	Nugent 65'; Murphy 83'; Barry 90'	Report	McSweeney 75'; Devitt 88'	Stadium: Eamonn Deacy Park; Attendance: 488; Referee: Adriano Reale

21 September 2019 27	Athlone Town	2–2	Galway United	Lissywollen, Athlone
19:45 GMT	Dillon 55', 89'	Report	Melody 15'; Brouder 90+1'	Stadium: Athlone Town Stadium; Attendance: 379; Referee: Kevin O'Sullivan

=== FAI Cup ===
Win Draw Loss

11 August 2019 First Round	Collinstown	1–2	Galway United	Whitehall, Dublin 9
14:00 GMT	Aherne 11'	Report	Barry 12', 15'	Stadium: Whitehall Stadium; Referee: Paul Tuite

23 August 2019 Second Round	Galway United	1–0	Cork City	Terryland, County Galway
19:45 GMT	Melody 45'	Report		Stadium: Eamonn Deacy Park; Attendance: 717; Referee: Robert Rogers

6 September 2019 Quarter-finals	Galway United	1–2	Shamrock Rovers	Terryland, County Galway
19:45 GMT	Nugent 33'	Report	Greene 56'; Grace 90+3'	Stadium: Eamonn Deacy Park; Attendance: 1,525; Referee: Derek tomney

=== League of Ireland Cup ===
Win Draw Loss

4 March 2019 First Round	Athlone Town	1–2 (a.e.t.)	Galway United	Lissywollen, Athlone
19:45 GMT	Mukete 7'	Report	Barry 70'; Faherty 112'	Stadium: Athlone Town Stadium; Referee: Anthony Buttimer

1 April 2019 Second Round	Waterford	2–1	Galway United	Waterford, County Waterford
19:00 GMT	Walsh 32'; Galvin 66'	Report	McGowan 57'	Stadium: RSC; Referee: Sean Grant

=== Friendlies ===
Win Draw Loss

==== Pre-season Friendlies ====
5 January 2019	Salthill Devon	0–1	Galway United	Drom, County Galway
		Report	Barry 12'	Stadium: Drom Soccer Park

15 January 2019	Finn Harps	2–0	Galway United	Ballybofey, County Donegal
	Borg 37'; McGinley 47'	Report		Stadium: Finn Park

26 January 2019	Sligo Rovers	3–0	Galway United	Castlebar, County Mayo
	Leverock 20'; Donelon 24', 57'	Report		Stadium: Milebush Park

2 February 2019	Galway United	0–0	Shamrock Rovers	Terryland, County Galway
		Report		Stadium: Eamonn Deacy Park

== Statistics ==
=== Appearances and goals ===
This table shows all of the players who have featured in a first team squad for Galway United this season
Brackets denotes how many of the listed appearances were made as a substitute

No.	Pos.	Player	League		FAI Cup		LOI Cup		Total	
No.	Pos.	Player	Apps	Goals	Apps	Goals	Apps	Goals	Apps	Goals
1	GK	(Republic of Ireland) Kevin Horgan	21	0	3	0	0	0	24	0
2	DF	(Republic of Ireland) Christopher Horgan	24(4)	0	3(2)	0	1	0	28	0
3	DF	(Republic of Ireland) Marc Ludden	23	5	2	0	2(1)	0	27	5
4	DF	(Republic of Ireland) Adam Rooney	4(1)	0	2	0	0	0	6	0
5	DF	(Republic of Ireland) Stephen Walsh	24(1)	2	3	0	2(1)	0	29	2
6	DF	(Republic of Ireland) Maurice Nugent	24(2)	3	3	1	1(1)	0	28	4
7	DF	(Republic of Ireland) Iarfhlaith Davoren	7(2)	0	1(1)	0	0	0	8	0
8	MF	(Republic of Ireland) Conor Melody	24(6)	3	3	1	1	0	28	4
9	FW	(Republic of Ireland) Vinny Faherty	24(2)	6	3(2)	0	1(1)	1	28	7
10	MF	(Republic of Ireland) Conor Barry	19(2)	5	3	2	1(1)	1	23	8
11	MF	(Republic of Ireland) Colin Kelly	13(3)	2	1(1)	0	1	0	15	2
12	MF	(Republic of Ireland) Ronan Asgari	1(1)	0	0	0	1	0	2	0
13	DF	(Republic of Ireland) Cian Murphy	20(1)	2	1(1)	0	1	0	22	2
14	FW	(Republic of Ireland) Wilson Waweru	15(6)	2	0	0	1(1)	0	16	2
15	MF	(Republic of Ireland) Mark Hannon	16(5)	0	0	0	1	0	17	0
16	GK	(Germany) Andreas Werner	5(1)	0	0	0	2	0	7	0
16	GK	(Republic of Ireland) Cian Mulryan	1	0	0	0	0	0	1	0
17	MF	(Argentina) Ivan Gamarra	16(6)	0	0	0	1	0	17	0
18	MF	(United States) Shane Doherty	15(9)	3	0	0	2	0	17	3
18	DF	(Republic of Ireland) Killian Brouder	6	1	3	0	0	0	9	1
19	MF	(Republic of Ireland) Alan Murphy	3(1)	0	0	0	0	0	3	0
19	DF	(Republic of Ireland) Jack Lynch	6(1)	0	3	0	0	0	9	0
20	MF	(Republic of Ireland) Donal Higgins	16(4)	1	3(1)	0	0	0	19	1
21	MF	(Republic of Ireland) Joe Collins	11(3)	0	3	0	2	0	16	0
22	FW	(Republic of Ireland) Jeff McGowan	3(2)	0	0	0	2	1	5	1
22	MF	(Republic of Ireland) Stephen Christopher	4(1)	0	3	0	0	0	7	0
23	FW	(Republic of Ireland) Dara Costelloe	14(5)	0	1(1)	0	2	0	17	0
24	MF	(Republic of Ireland) Matthew Barrett	5(4)	0	0	0	2(1)	0	7	0
24	MF	(Republic of Ireland) Caoilfhionn O'Dea	1(1)	0	0	0	0	0	1	0
25	GK	(Republic of Ireland) James Tierney	1	0	0	0	0	0	1	0
26	DF	(Republic of Ireland) Andrew Peters	1	0	0	0	0	0	1	0
27	FW	(Republic of Ireland) Conor Layng	7(4)	1	0	0	0	0	7	1
29	MF	(Republic of Ireland) Joshua Keane Quinlivan	3(2)	0	0	0	0	0	3	0

=== Clean sheets ===
No.	Player	League	FAI Cup	LOI Cup	Total		
No.	Player	1	(Republic of Ireland) Kevin Horgan	6	1	0	7
16	(Germany) Andreas Werner	1	0	0	1		
16	(Republic of Ireland) Cian Mulryan	0	0	0	0		
25	(Republic of Ireland) James Tierney	0	0	0	0		

=== Disciplinary record ===
No.	Player	League			FAI Cup			LOI Cup			Total		
No.	Player	Yellow card	(yellow card) (yellow-red card)	Red card	Yellow card	(yellow card) (yellow-red card)	Red card	Yellow card	(yellow card) (yellow-red card)	Red card	Yellow card	(yellow card) (yellow-red card)	Red card
5	Stephen Walsh	6	1	0	1	0	0	1	0	0	8	1	0
3	Marc Ludden	5	0	0	2	0	0	1	0	0	8	0	0
6	Maurice Nugent	3	0	0	0	0	0	1	0	0	4	0	0
13	Cian Murphy	4	0	0	0	0	0	0	0	0	4	0	0
23	Dara Costelloe	1	0	1	1	0	0	1	0	0	3	0	1
20	Donal Higgins	2	0	0	1	0	0	0	0	0	3	0	0
2	Christopher Horgan	2	0	0	0	0	0	0	0	0	2	0	0
9	Vinny Faherty	1	0	0	1	0	0	0	0	0	2	0	0
14	Wilson Waweru	2	0	0	0	0	0	0	0	0	2	0	0
17	Ivan Gamarra	2	0	0	0	0	0	0	0	0	2	0	0
19	Alan Murphy	2	0	0	0	0	0	0	0	0	2	0	0
19	Jack Lynch	2	0	0	0	0	0	0	0	0	2	0	0
1	Kevin Horgan	1	0	0	0	0	0	0	0	0	1	0	0
7	Iarfhlaith Davoren	1	0	0	0	0	0	0	0	0	1	0	0
8	Conor Melody	0	0	1	0	0	0	0	0	0	0	0	1
10	Conor Barry	1	0	0	0	0	0	0	0	0	1	0	0
11	Colin Kelly	0	0	0	1	0	0	0	0	0	1	0	0
16	Andreas Werner	0	0	0	0	0	0	1	0	0	1	0	0
18	Shane Doherty	0	0	0	0	0	0	1	0	0	1	0	0
Totals		35	1	2	7	0	0	6	0	0	48	1	2
