= 2017 Galway United F.C. season =

Irish football club season

Galway United
2017 season
- Manager: Shane Keegan
- Stadium: Eamonn Deacy Park
- Premier Division: 10th (relegated)
- FAI Cup: Quarter-finals
- League of Ireland Cup: Semi-finals
- Top goalscorer: League: Ronan Murray (13); All: Ronan Murray (17)
Home colours	Away colours

The 2017 Galway United F.C. season was the football club's 39th season in the League of Ireland, their third season in the League of Ireland Premier Division since gaining promotion in 2014.

Shane Keegan was brought in as the manager for the season, after the club had sacked Tommy Dunne the previous year.

The club finished the season in 10th, third from last, which under normal circumstances would have meant the club were safe, but due to a change in format for the League of Ireland the club were relegated.

The club also made it the to the Quarter-finals of the FAI Cup and the Semi-finals of the League of Ireland Cup during the season.

== Squad ==
#	Name	Nationality	Position	Date of birth (age)	Previous Club	Signed	Notes
Goalkeepers
1	Conor Winn	(England)	GK	February 26, 1992 (aged 25)	(Republic of Ireland) Finn Harps	2015	
30	Charlie Burns	(England)	GK	May 27, 1995 (aged 22)	(England) MK Dons	2017	
Defenders
2	Colm Horgan	(Republic of Ireland)	DF	July 2, 1994 (aged 23)	(Republic of Ireland) Salthill Devon	2014	Captain
3	Marc Ludden	(Republic of Ireland)	DF	February 28, 1990 (aged 27)	(Republic of Ireland) Mervue United	2014	
5	Niall Maher	(England)	DF	July 31, 1995 (aged 22)	(England) Bury	2017	
12	Maurice Nugent	(Republic of Ireland)	DF	July 30, 1998 (aged 19)	(Republic of Ireland) Mervue United	2017	
13	Aaron Conway	(Republic of Ireland)	DF	December 7, 1997 (aged 19)	(Republic of Ireland) Arlington FC	2017	
21	Gary Kineen	(Republic of Ireland)	DF	July 1, 1997 (aged 20)	(Republic of Ireland) Salthill Devon	2016	
57	Stephen Folan	(Republic of Ireland)	DF	January 14, 1992 (aged 25)	(Republic of Ireland) Cork City	2016	
Midfielders
4	Paul Sinnott	(Republic of Ireland)	MF	July 24, 1986 (aged 31)	(Republic of Ireland) Mervue United	2014	
6	Alex Byrne	(Republic of Ireland)	MF	March 8, 1995 (aged 22)	(Republic of Ireland) Salthill Devon	2014	
7	Gavan Holohan	(Republic of Ireland)	MF	December 15, 1991 (aged 25)	(Republic of Ireland) Cork City	2017	
8	David Cawley	(Republic of Ireland)	MF	September 17, 1991 (aged 26)	(Republic of Ireland) St Patrick's Athletic	2017	
11	Conor Melody	(Republic of Ireland)	MF	March 15, 1997 (aged 20)	(Republic of Ireland) Salthill Devon	2015	
14	Kevin Devaney	(Republic of Ireland)	MF	September 26, 1990 (aged 27)	(Republic of Ireland) Sligo Rovers	2016	
15	Conor Barry	(Republic of Ireland)	MF	September 2, 1995 (aged 22)	(Republic of Ireland) Athlone Town	2017	
17	Gary Shanahan	(Republic of Ireland)	MF	February 15, 1993 (aged 24)	(Republic of Ireland) Mervue United	2014	
18	Rory Hale	(Republic of Ireland)	MF	November 27, 1996 (aged 20)	(England) Aston Villa	2017	
20	Declan Sharkey	(Isle of Man)	MF	April 28, 1998 (aged 19)	(Republic of Ireland) Finn Harps	2017	
23	Ronan Manning	(Republic of Ireland)	MF	May 15, 2000 (aged 17)	(Republic of Ireland) Mervue United	2017	
Forwards
9	Pádraic Cunningham	(Republic of Ireland)	FW	November 13, 1996 (aged 20)	(Republic of Ireland) Mervue United	2014	
19	Ronan Murray	(Republic of Ireland)	FW	September 12, 1991 (aged 26)	(England) Notts County	2017	
22	Eoin McCormack	(Republic of Ireland)	FW	June 8, 1995 (aged 22)	(Republic of Ireland) Ballinasloe Town	2017	
Players who departed before the end of the season
5	Lee Grace	(Republic of Ireland)	DF	December 1, 1992 (aged 24)	(Republic of Ireland) Wexford Youths	2017	
10	Vinny Faherty	(Republic of Ireland)	FW	June 13, 1987 (aged 30)	(Republic of Ireland) Limerick	2016	
10	Jonah Ayunga	(Kenya)	FW	May 24, 1997 (aged 20)	(England) Brighton & Hove Albion	2017	Loan
15	Robert Spelman	(Republic of Ireland)	MF	September 1, 1997 (aged 19)	(Republic of Ireland) Mervue United	2017	
16	Ciaran Nugent	(United States)	GK	October 27, 1991 (aged 25)	(Republic of Ireland) Sligo Rovers	2017	
18	Jesse Devers	(Republic of Ireland)	FW	January 11, 1997 (aged 20)	(England) Wolverhampton Wanderers	2016	

=== Transfers ===
==== In ====
Date	Position	Nationality	Name	Last club	Ref.
1 December 2016	MF	(Republic of Ireland)	David Cawley	(Republic of Ireland) St Patrick's Athletic	
2 December 2016	FW	(Republic of Ireland)	Ronan Murray	(England) Notts County	
6 December 2016	DF	(Republic of Ireland)	Lee Grace	(Republic of Ireland) Wexford Youths	
13 December 2016	MF	(Republic of Ireland)	Gavan Holohan	(Republic of Ireland) Cork City	
17 January 2017	GK	(United States)	Ciaran Nugent	(Republic of Ireland) Sligo Rovers	
17 February 2017	MF	(Isle of Man)	Declan Sharkey	(Republic of Ireland) Finn Harps	
16 June 2017	FW	(Republic of Ireland)	Eoin McCormack	(Republic of Ireland) Ballinasloe Town	
26 July 2017	GK	(England)	Charlie Burns	(England) MK Dons	
4 August 2017	MF	(Republic of Ireland)	Rory Hale	(England) Aston Villa	
30 August 2017	DF	(England)	Niall Maher	(England) Bury	
31 August 2017	MF	(Republic of Ireland)	Conor Barry	(Republic of Ireland) Athlone Town	

==== Out ====
Date	Position	Nationality	Name	To	Ref.
18 November 2016	MF	(Republic of Ireland)	Ryan Connolly	(Republic of Ireland) Shamrock Rovers	
15 December 2016	GK	(Republic of Ireland)	Kevin Horgan	(Republic of Ireland) Shamrock Rovers	
9 January 2017	DF	(Republic of Ireland)	Kilian Cantwell	(Republic of Ireland) Finn Harps	
9 January 2017	DF	(Republic of Ireland)	Stephen Walsh	(Republic of Ireland) Longford Town	
9 January 2017	FW	(Republic of Ireland)	Enda Curran	(Republic of Ireland) Longford Town	
2 February 2017	GK	(Republic of Ireland)	Connor Gleeson	(Republic of Ireland) Athlone Town	
7 February 2017	DF	(Sweden)	Armin Aganovic	(Norway) Raufoss IL	
14 June 2017	GK	(United States)	Ciaran Nugent		
6 July 2017	MF	(Republic of Ireland)	Robert Spelman	(Republic of Ireland) Athlone Town	
6 July 2017	FW	(Republic of Ireland)	Jesse Devers	(Republic of Ireland) Manulla	
31 July 2017	DF	(Republic of Ireland)	Lee Grace	(Republic of Ireland) Shamrock Rovers	
31 July 2017	FW	(Republic of Ireland)	Vinny Faherty	(Republic of Ireland) Sligo Rovers	
5 August 2017 (Note: Ramsbottom departed Galway United before the start of the season. However, he only joined Barrow in August.)	GK	(England)	Sam Ramsbottom	(England) Barrow	

==== Loan In ====
Date	Position	Nationality	Name	From	Date until	Ref.
31 July 2017	FW	(Kenya)	Jonah Ayunga	(England) Brighton & Hove Albion	1 September 2017 (Note: Ayunga's loan deal was originally supposed to last until the end of the season, however he was recalled by Brighton after suffering a season ending injury.)	

== Club ==
=== Coaching staff ===
- Manager: Shane Keegan
- First Team Coach: Johnny Glynn
- Goalkeeping Coach: Leo Tierney
- Strength and Conditioning Coach: Johnny O'Connor
- Physiotherapist: Kevin D'Arcy

== Competitions ==
=== League of Ireland Premier Division ===
At the start of the season the League of Ireland announced plans to take the Premier Division from 12 to 10 teams and the First Division from 8 to 10 teams. As a result of this only one team was promoted from the First Division and three were relegated from the Premier Division with no relegation play-offs. It was because of this change that Galway United were relegated at the end of the season.

==== League Table ====
Pos	Team	Pld	W	D	L	GF	GA	GD	Pts	Qualification or relegation
8	St Patrick's Athletic	33	9	12	12	45	52	−7	39	
9	Sligo Rovers	33	8	15	10	33	44	−11	39	
10	Galway United (R)	33	7	14	12	45	50	−5	35	Relegation to League of Ireland First Division
11	Finn Harps (R)	33	9	3	21	35	67	−32	30	Relegation to League of Ireland First Division
12	Drogheda United (R)	33	5	7	21	22	65	−43	22	Relegation to League of Ireland First Division

Source: SSE Airtricity League, Soccerway
Rules for classification: 1) Points; 2) Goal difference; 3) Goals scored.
(R) Relegated

==== Results summary ====
Overall								Home						Away					
Pld	W	D	L	GF	GA	GD	Pts	W	D	L	GF	GA	GD	W	D	L	GF	GA	GD
33	7	14	12	45	50	−5	35	6	5	6	27	23	+4	1	9	6	18	27	−9

==== Results by round ====
Round	1	2	3	4	5	6	7	8	9	10	11	12	13	14	15	16	17	18	19	20	21	22	23	24	25	26	27	28	29	30	31	32	33
Ground	H	A	A	H	A	H	A	H	A	H	A	H	H	H	A	H	A	A	H	A	A	H	H	A	A	H	A	H	H	A	H	A	H
Result	L	L	D	L	D	D	L	D	D	W	D	D	D	W	L	L	L	D	L	L	D	W	W	L	W	L	D	W	W	D	D	D	L
Position	10	11	11	11	11	12	12	12	12	12	12	11	11	9	10	11	12	11	11	12	12	10	10	10	10	11	11	11	8	10	10	10	10

Source: 2017 League of Ireland Premier Division
A = Away; H = Home; W = Win; D = Draw; L = Loss

==== Matches ====
Win Draw Loss

24 February 2017 1	Galway United	0–1	Drogheda United	Terryland, County Galway
19:45 GMT		Report	McCaffrey 81'	Stadium: Eamonn Deacy Park; Attendance: 2,113; Referee: Rob Hennessy

3 March 2017 2	Cork City	4–0	Galway United	Turners Cross, Cork
19:45 GMT	Maguire 15'; Delaney 53'; Dooley 64'; Ellis 90+3'	Report		Stadium: Turners Cross; Attendance: 3,335; Referee: Paul McLaughlin

10 March 2017 3	Finn Harps	1–1	Galway United	Ballybofey, County Donegal
20:00 GMT	Houston 28'	Report	Devaney 47'	Stadium: Finn Park; Attendance: 1,022; Referee: Paul Tuite

13 March 2017 4	Galway United	1–2	Shamrock Rovers	Terryland, County Galway
19:00 GMT	Murray 58'	Report	Shaw 2', 65'	Stadium: Eamonn Deacy Park; Attendance: 1,051; Referee: Rob Hennessy

17 March 2017 5	Bohemians	1–1	Galway United	Phibsborough, Dublin 7
19:45 GMT	Corcoran 16'	Report	Murray 40'; Byrne (yellow card) 59' (yellow-red card) 69'	Stadium: Dalymount Park; Attendance: 1,137; Referee: Neil Doyle

3 April 2017 6	Galway United	1–1	Sligo Rovers	Terryland, County Galway
19:45 GMT	Murray 11'	Report	Sadlier 35'	Stadium: Eamonn Deacy Park; Attendance: 891; Referee: Graham Kelly

7 April 2017 7	Bray Wanderers	1–0	Galway United	Bray, County Wicklow
19:45 GMT	McCabe 33'; Kenna (yellow card) 30' (yellow-red card) 62'	Report		Stadium: Carlisle Grounds; Attendance: 477; Referee: John McLoughlin

14 April 2017 8	Galway United	1–1	St Patrick's Athletic	Terryland, County Galway
19:45 GMT	Murray 89' (pen.)	Report	Feely 40'	Stadium: Eamonn Deacy Park; Attendance: 1,119; Referee: Derek Tomney

21 April 2017 9	Limerick	1–1	Galway United	Garryowen, Limerick
19:45 GMT	Williams 32'	Report	Cawley 85'	Stadium: Markets Field; Attendance: 1,713; Referee: Sean Grant

28 April 2017 10	Galway United	2–1	Dundalk	Terryland, County Galway
19:45 GMT	Faherty 25'; Shanahan 90+3'	Report	McMillan 36'	Stadium: Eamonn Deacy Park; Attendance: 1,317; Referee: Ben Connolly

5 May 2017 11	Drogheda United	2–2	Galway United	Drogheda, County Louth
19:45 GMT	Wixted 10', 90'	Report	Cunningham 82'; Devers 90+1'	Stadium: United Park; Attendance: 796; Referee: Jim McKell

8 May 2017 12	Galway United	0–0	Derry City	Terryland, County Galway
19:45 GMT		Report		Stadium: Eamonn Deacy Park; Attendance: 723; Referee: Rob Hennessy

12 May 2017 13	Galway United	1–1	Cork City	Terryland, County Galway
19:45 GMT	Folan 61'	Report	McCormack 59'	Stadium: Eamonn Deacy Park; Attendance: 1,231; Referee: Rob Harvey

19 May 2017 14	Galway United	2–1	Finn Harps	Terryland, County Galway
19:45 GMT	Winn 27' (o.g.); Murray 74' (pen.); Faherty 90+2'	Report		Stadium: Eamonn Deacy Park; Attendance: 1,009; Referee: Ray Matthews

22 May 2017 15	Shamrock Rovers	2–0	Galway United	Tallaght, Dublin 24
20:00 GMT	Shaw 36'; Miele 67'	Report		Stadium: Tallaght Stadium; Attendance: 1,234; Referee: Derek Tomney

26 May 2017 16	Galway United	1–2	Bohemians	Terryland, County Galway
19:45 GMT	Murray 55'	Report	Corcoran 5'; Fitzgerald 36'	Stadium: Eamonn Deacy Park; Attendance: 1,361; Referee: Ben Connolly

2 June 2017 17	Derry City	2–1	Galway United	Derry, Northern Ireland
19:45 GMT	Curtis 5'; Boyle 9'	Report	Shanahan 25'	Stadium: Brandywell Stadium; Attendance: 1,500; Referee: Rob Harvey

17 June 2017 18	Sligo Rovers	1–1	Galway United	Sligo, County Sligo
19:45 GMT	Ayunga 10'	Report	Folan 24'; Ludden (yellow card) 62' (yellow-red card) 90+3'	Stadium: The Showgrounds; Attendance: 1,679; Referee: Graham Kelly

23 June 2017 19	Galway United	1–2	Bray Wanderers	Terryland, County Galway
19:45 GMT	Folan 76'	Report	Flood 18'; Salmon 26'	Stadium: Eamonn Deacy Park; Attendance: 1,022; Referee: Paul Tuite

26 June 2017 20	Dundalk	2–0	Galway United	Dundalk, County Louth
19:45 GMT	Massey 15'; McEleney 63'	Report		Stadium: Oriel Park; Attendance: 2,370; Referee: Rob Harvey

30 June 2017 21	St Patrick's Athletic	1–1	Galway United	Inchicore, Dublin 8
19:45 GMT	Byrne 48'	Report	Cunningham 83'	Stadium: Richmond Park; Attendance: 1,252; Referee: Derek Tomney

7 July 2017 22	Galway United	3–1	Limerick	Terryland, County Galway
19:45 GMT	Murray 34'; Cunningham 36'; McCormack 81'	Report	Coughlan 89'	Stadium: Eamonn Deacy Park; Attendance: 1,471; Referee: Neil Doyle

21 July 2017 23	Galway United	4–1	Drogheda United	Terryland, County Galway
19:45 GMT	Holohan 16', 21', 80'; Grace 90+2'	Report	Coughlan 89'	Stadium: Eamonn Deacy Park; Attendance: 1,028; Referee: James McKell

28 July 2017 24	Cork City	2–1	Galway United	Turners Cross, Cork
19:45 GMT	Buckley 52'	Report	Holohan 6'; Grace 67' (o.g.)	Stadium: Turners Cross; Attendance: 3,744; Referee: Sean Grant

4 August 2017 25	Finn Harps	1–3	Galway United	Ballybofey, County Donegal
20:00 GMT	Dsane 45+1'; McCourt (yellow card) 37' (yellow-red card) 51'	Report	Holohan 13'; Murray 76', 83'	Stadium: Finn Park; Attendance: 1,214; Referee: Neil Doyle

18 August 2017 26	Galway United	1–2	Shamrock Rovers	Terryland, County Galway
19:45 GMT	Murray 27'	Report	Shaw 78', 89'	Stadium: Eamonn Deacy Park; Attendance: 1,404; Referee: Anthony Buttimer

1 September 2017 27	Bohemians	1–1	Galway United	Phibsborough, Dublin 7
19:45 GMT	Kavanagh 16'	Report	Cunningham 72'	Stadium: Dalymount Park; Attendance: 1,586; Referee: Derek Tomney

15 September 2017 28	Galway United	2–1	Derry City	Terryland, County Galway
19:45 GMT	Devaney 13'; Folan 78'	Report	Patterson 31'	Stadium: Eamonn Deacy Park; Attendance: 875; Referee: Ray Matthews

22 September 2017 29	Galway United	3–1	Sligo Rovers	Terryland, County Galway
19:45 GMT	Ludden 43'; Devaney 71'; Holohan 74'	Report	McFadden 14'	Stadium: Eamonn Deacy Park; Attendance: 2,117; Referee: Jim McKell

7 October 2017 30	Bray Wanderers	3–3	Galway United	Bray, County Wicklow
15:00 GMT	Marks 16', 47'; Greene 73' (pen.)	Report	Devaney 14', 85'; Murray 66' (pen.) (penalty missed) 90+3'	Stadium: Carlisle Grounds; Attendance: 552; Referee: Tomas Connolly

13 October 2017 31	Galway United	1–1	St Patrick's Athletic	Terryland, County Galway
19:45 GMT	McCormack 35'	Report	Dennehy 44'	Stadium: Eamonn Deacy Park; Attendance: 2,164; Referee: Robert Rogers

20 October 2017 32	Limerick	2–2	Galway United	Garryowen, Limerick
19:45 GMT	Tosi 35' (pen.); Ogbene 42'	Report	Murray 47' (penalty missed) 70'; McCormack 82' (pen.)	Stadium: Markets Field; Attendance: 1,609; Referee: Anthony Buttimer

27 October 2017 33	Galway United	3–4	Dundalk	Terryland, County Galway
19:45 GMT	Folan 8'; Hale 52'; Murray 88'	Report	Vemmelund 10'; McGrath 41'; McEleney 45'; Duffy 90'	Stadium: Eamonn Deacy Park; Attendance: 2,214; Referee: Ben Connolly

=== FAI Cup ===
Win Draw Loss

13 August 2017 First Round	Killester United	3–3 (a.e.t.) (6–7 p)	Galway United	Killester, Dublin 5
19:45 GMT	Chambers 1', 90+2'; McMillan 82'	Report	Murray 72' (pen.), 77', 88'	Stadium: Hadden Park; Referee: Paul Tuite
	Penalties
	Penalty scored Penalty missed		Murray (penalty scored); Holohan (penalty scored); Cawley (penalty missed); McCormack (penalty scored); Ludden (penalty missed); Horgan (penalty scored); Conway (penalty scored); Sinnott (penalty scored); Ayunga (penalty scored)

25 August 2017 Second Round	St Patrick's Athletic	0–2	Galway United	Inchicore, Dublin 8
19:45 GMT		Report	Ayunga 17'; McCormack 90+2'	Stadium: Richmond Park; Attendance: 1,100; Referee: Paul McLaughlin

8 September 2017 Quarter–finals	Galway United	1–2	Limerick	Terryland, County Galway
19:45 GMT	Cunningham 79'	Report	Tosi 53'; Duggan 63'	Stadium: Eamonn Deacy Park; Attendance: 853; Referee: Ben Connolly

=== League of Ireland Cup ===
Win Draw Loss

27 March 2017 First Round	Galway United	2–0	Mayo League	Terryland, County Galway
19:45 GMT	Cawley 45'; Faherty 90'	Report		Stadium: Eamonn Deacy Park; Referee: Marc Lynch

17 April 2017 Second Round	Galway United	2–0	Derry City	Terryland, County Galway
19:45 GMT	Devaney 27'; Faherty 90'	Report		Stadium: Eamonn Deacy Park; Referee: Anthony Buttimer

1 May 2017 Quarter-finals	Sligo Rovers	2–2 (a.e.t.) (1–3 p)	Galway United	Sligo, County Sligo
15:00 GMT	Stevens 93'; Sadlier 115' (pen.)	Report	Murray 95'; Holohan 104'	Stadium: The Showgrounds; Referee: Rob Rogers
	Penalties
	(penalty missed) Roddan; (penalty missed) Martin; (penalty scored) Sadlier; (penalty missed) Ayunga		Folan (penalty scored); Murray (penalty missed); Horgan (penalty missed); Cunningham (penalty scored); Holohan (penalty scored)

7 August 2017 Semi-finals	Galway United	0–3	Dundalk	Terryland, County Galway
19:00 GMT	Devaney 77' (o.g.)	Report	McGrath 11'; Benson 56'	Stadium: Eamonn Deacy Park; Attendance: 1,017; Referee: Ray Matthews

=== Friendlies ===
Win Draw Loss

==== Pre-season Friendlies ====
27 January 2017	Galway United	1–0	Sligo Rovers	Terryland, County Galway
19:45 GMT	Murray 89'	Report		Stadium: Eamonn Deacy Park; Referee: Marc Lynch

3 February 2017	Galway United	2–1	Athlone Town	Terryland, County Galway
19:45 GMT	Devaney 30'; Faherty 90'	Report	Lyons 40'	Stadium: Eamonn Deacy Park; Referee: Marc Lynch

6 February 2017	Irish Colleges & Universities	1–2	Galway United	Coolock, Dublin 17
	O'Sullivan 70'	Report	Murray 27'; Devers 28'	Stadium: AUL Complex

8 February 2017	Waterford	2–1	Galway United	Waterford, County Waterford
	O'Sullivan 37', 44'	Report	Grace 60'	Stadium: RSC

13 February 2017	Galway United	2–1	Limerick	Terryland, County Galway
19:45 GMT	Murray 67', 87'	Report	Ogbene 21'	Stadium: Eamonn Deacy Park; Attendance: 200; Referee: Marc Lynch

18 February 2017	Cobh Ramblers	0–2	Galway United	Cobh, County Cork
19:45 GMT	O'Donnell 57' (o.g.)	Report	Cunningham 81'	Stadium: St Colman's Park; Attendance: 250; Referee: David Keeler

== Statistics ==
=== Appearances and goals ===
This table shows all of the players who have featured in a first team squad for Galway United this season
Brackets denotes how many of the listed appearances were made as a substitute

No.	Pos.	Player	League		FAI Cup		LOI Cup		Total	
No.	Pos.	Player	Apps	Goals	Apps	Goals	Apps	Goals	Apps	Goals
1	GK	(England) Conor Winn	31	0	2	0	0	0	33	0
2	DF	(Republic of Ireland) Colm Horgan	32	0	3	0	3	0	38	0
3	DF	(Republic of Ireland) Marc Ludden	31	1	2(1)	0	3(1)	0	36	1
4	MF	(Republic of Ireland) Paul Sinnott	11(3)	0	3	0	4	0	18	0
5	DF	(Republic of Ireland) Lee Grace	24	1	0	0	2	0	26	1
5	DF	(England) Niall Maher	5	0	0	0	0	0	5	0
6	MF	(Republic of Ireland) Alex Byrne	22(3)	0	3	0	4(1)	0	29	0
7	MF	(Republic of Ireland) Gavan Holohan	27(1)	6	3(1)	0	3(1)	1	33	7
8	MF	(Republic of Ireland) David Cawley	29	1	2(1)	0	3(1)	1	34	2
9	FW	(Republic of Ireland) Pádraic Cunningham	26(14)	4	1(1)	1	2	0	29	5
10	FW	(Republic of Ireland) Vinny Faherty	18(7)	2	0	0	2	2	20	4
10	FW	(Kenya) Jonah Ayunga	2	0	2	1	0	0	4	1
11	MF	(Republic of Ireland) Conor Melody	25(20)	0	2(2)	0	2	0	29	0
12	DF	(Republic of Ireland) Maurice Nugent	0	0	0	0	1	0	1	0
13	DF	(Republic of Ireland) Aaron Conway	3(3)	0	2	0	2	0	7	0
14	MF	(Republic of Ireland) Kevin Devaney	30(3)	5	2	0	3(1)	1	35	6
15	MF	(Republic of Ireland) Robert Spelman	0	0	0	0	2(1)	0	2	0
15	MF	(Republic of Ireland) Conor Barry	0	0	0	0	0	0	0	0
16	GK	(United States) Ciaran Nugent	2	0	0	0	3	0	5	0
17	MF	(Republic of Ireland) Gary Shanahan	25(8)	2	2(1)	0	3	0	30	2
18	FW	(Republic of Ireland) Jesse Devers	11(8)	1	0	0	2	0	13	1
18	MF	(Republic of Ireland) Rory Hale	8	1	3	0	1	0	12	1
19	FW	(Republic of Ireland) Ronan Murray	32(1)	13	3	3	3(3)	1	38	17
20	MF	(Isle of Man) Declan Sharkey	0	0	0	0	1(1)	0	1	0
21	DF	(Republic of Ireland) Gary Kineen	2(1)	0	0	0	2	0	4	0
22	FW	(Republic of Ireland) Eoin McCormack	15(9)	3	3(1)	1	1(1)	0	19	4
23	MF	(Republic of Ireland) Ronan Manning	3(3)	0	2(1)	0	1(1)	0	6	0
30	GK	(Republic of Ireland) James Tierney	0	0	0	0	0	0	0	0
30	GK	(England) Charlie Burns	0	0	1	0	1	0	2	0
57	DF	(Republic of Ireland) Stephen Folan	33	5	2	0	2	0	37	5

=== Clean sheets ===
No.	Player	League	FAI Cup	LOI Cup	Total		
No.	Player	1	(England) Conor Winn	1	1	0	2
16	(United States) Ciaran Nugent	0	0	2	2		
30	(England) Charlie Burns	0	0	0	0		
