= Conor Winn =

English footballer (born 1992)

Personal information
- Date of birth: 26 February 1992 (age 34)
- Place of birth: Essex, England
- Height: 1.98 m (6 ft 6 in)
- Position: Goalkeeper

Youth career
- 2001–2005: Salthill Devon
- 2005–2009: Mervue United

Senior career*
Years	Team	Apps	(Gls)
2009–2010	Mervue United	2	(0)
2010–2011	Galway United	14	(0)
2012–2013	Shamrock Rovers	0	(0)
2013	Dundalk	0	(0)
2014	Finn Harps	21	(0)
2015–2017	Galway United	74	(0)
2022–2023	Treaty United	8	(0)
Total		119	(0)
- * Club domestic league appearances and goals

Conor Winn (born 26 February 1992) is an English former professional footballer who played as a goalkeeper.

Winn played youth football with Salthill Devon and Mervue United before starting his professional career with Galway United. He would have two spells with Galway, along with stints with Shamrock Rovers, Dundalk, Finn Harps and Treaty United.

== Early life ==
Born in Essex, England, Winn grew up in Galway, Ireland.

== Youth career ==
As a youth player Winn played for Galway clubs, Salthill Devon and Mervue United.

Winn started for Mervue in the 2010 FAI Youth Cup final, as the club lost 0–1 to Limerick side, Fairview Rangers.

== Playing career ==
=== Mervue United ===
Winn made his debut for League of Ireland First Division side Mervue United on the last day of the 2009 season, coming on as a substitute for starting keeper Eoin Martin in a match against Wexford Youths at Ferrycarrig Park.

Winn played one more game for the club in the 2010 season, also against Wexford Youths at Ferrycarrig Park.

=== Galway United ===
For the second half of the 2010 season, Winn joined League of Ireland Premier Division club Galway United. On 29 October 2010, Winn made his debut for the club in a 3–3 draw with Drogheda United.

In the second half of the 2011 season, Winn became Galway’s first choice keeper. Winn started in the play-offs as Galway lost 1–5 over two-legs to Monaghan United, and were relegated.

Galway United withdrew from the League of Ireland ahead of the 2012 season.

=== Shamrock Rovers ===
On 20 February 2012, Winn signed a two-year deal with the reigning League of Ireland champions Shamrock Rovers, the club announced the signing alongside the signing of Aaron Greene from Sligo Rovers.

Winn played his only game for the club in a 4–1 win over Dundalk in the quarter-finals of the Leinster Senior Cup.

=== Dundalk ===
Conor Winn signed with Dundalk for the second half of the 2013 season. Winn would go on to not play a single game for the club.

=== Finn Harps ===
Winn signed for League of Ireland First Division side Finn Harps ahead of the 2014 season. Winn kept three clean sheets in his first three league matches with the club.

During that season Finn Harps made a run to the FAI Cup semi-finals. With Winn playing in every single game in the tournament.

=== Galway United ===
On 27 February 2015, Winn once again signed for newly promoted, Galway United. Throughout the season, Winn was competing for a starting spot with Ger Hanley, Connor Gleeson and Kevin Horgan. Winn played over half of Galway’s league games that season playing a key role in the club surviving relegation.

That season Galway made it to the League of Ireland Cup final. They played St Patrick's Athletic in a game that ended 0–0 after extra-time. During the penalty shoot-out despite Winn saving a penalty from Seán Hoare, Galway would go on to lose the shoutout 3–4.

Winn re-signed with Galway for the 2016 season. During the 2016 season, Winn was definitively Galway’s starting keeper as he once again helped them survive relegation.

Winn once again re-signed ahead of the 2017 season. At the same time Galway signed fellow goalkeeper, Ciaran Nugent from Sligo Rovers as Winn’s competition for the season.

At the end of that season Galway finished 10th out of 12 teams which would normally mean they were safe, however as a result of a change in format in the League of Ireland, Galway were relegated.

==== Bray Wanderers ====
Ahead of the 2018 season, Winn went on trial with Bray Wanderers, however the club did not sign him for the upcoming season.

=== Treaty United ===
Following an over four year absence from the League of Ireland, In January 2022, Winn signed for League of Ireland First Division side Treaty United ahead of only their second season as a club. Winn was signed alongside fellow goalkeeper Jack Brady, Winn would serve as second choice for the majority of his time with the club. Winn played in all of the rounds of the 2022 FAI Cup to get Treaty to the semi-finals.

=== Galway & District League ===
Following the end of his time in the League of Ireland, Winn would go on to play in the Galway & District League for his former club Mervue United and Maree Oranmore.

Winn represented a Galway & District League representative team in the 2026 Oscar Traynor Cup final, as they defeated the Limerick & District League 5–0 at Eamonn Deacy Park.

== Managerial career ==
Winn works as a goalkeeping coach for Galway Bohemians.

== Statistics ==
=== Club ===
Appearances and goals by club, season and competition
Club	Season	League			National cup (Note: Includes FAI Cup)		League cup (Note: Includes League of Ireland Cup)		Other		Total	
Club	Season	Division	Apps	Goals	Apps	Goals	Apps	Goals	Apps	Goals	Apps	Goals
Mervue United	2009	LOI First Division	1	0	0	0	0	0	—		1	0
Mervue United	2010	LOI First Division	1	0	0	0	0	0	—		1	0
Mervue United	Total		2	0	0	0	0	0	0	0	2	0
Galway United	2010	LOI Premier Division	1	0	0	0	0	0	0	0	1	0
Galway United	2011	LOI Premier Division	13	0	0	0	1	0	2 (Note: Appearances in 2011 LOI promotion/relegation play-offs)	0	16	0
Galway United	Total		14	0	0	0	1	0	2	0	17	0
Shamrock Rovers	2012	LOI Premier Division	0	0	0	0	0	0	0	0	0	0
Shamrock Rovers	2013	LOI Premier Division	0	0	0	0	0	0	1 (Note: Appearance in Leinster Senior Cup)	0	1	0
Shamrock Rovers	Total		0	0	0	0	0	0	1	0	1	0
Dundalk	2013	LOI Premier Division	0	0	0	0	0	0	0	0	0	0
Finn Haprs	2014	LOI First Division	21	0	5	0	1	0	0	0	27	0
Galway United	2015	LOI Premier Division	18	0	0	0	2	0	—		20	0
Galway United	2016	LOI Premier Division	25	0	1	0	0	0	—		26	0
Galway United	2017	LOI Premier Division	31	0	2	0	0	0	—		33	0
Galway United	Total		74	0	3	0	2	0	0	0	79	0
Treaty United	2022	LOI First Division	5	0	3	0	—		1 (Note: Appearance in Munster Senior Cup)	0	9	0
Treaty United	2023	LOI First Division	3	0	1	0	—		1	0	5	0
Treaty United	Total		8	0	4	0	0	0	2	0	14	0
Career total			119	0	12	0	4	0	7	0	142	0

== Honours ==
Galway United

- League of Ireland Cup; runner up: 2015
