= Rory Hale =

Northern Irish footballer (born 1996)

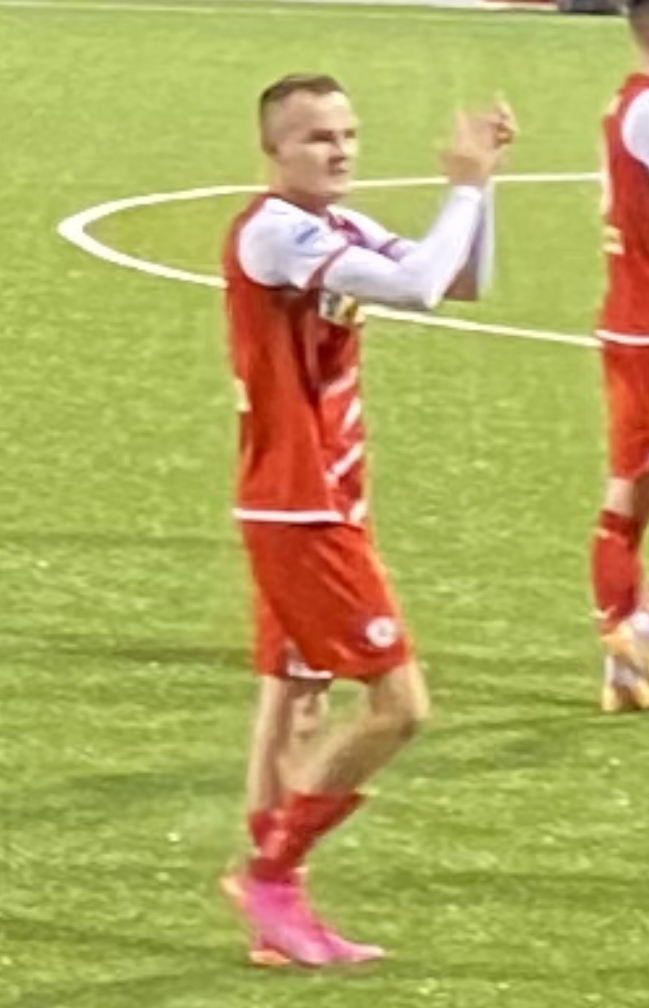

Personal information
- Date of birth: 27 November 1996 (age 29)
- Place of birth: Belfast, Northern Ireland
- Position: Midfielder

Team information
- Current team: Cliftonville
- Number: 8

Youth career
- –2017: Aston Villa

Senior career*
Years	Team	Apps	(Gls)
2017	Galway United	8	(1)
2018	Derry City	32	(2)
2019–2021	Crusaders	34	(2)
2021–	Cliftonville	182	(32)

International career
2013	Northern Ireland U19	2	(0)
2018	Republic of Ireland U21	2	(1)
- * Club domestic league appearances and goals as of 29 April 2026

Rory Hale (born 27 November 1996) is an Irish footballer who plays for Cliftonville in the NIFL Premiership.

== Club career ==
=== Aston Villa ===
Hale started his career at Aston Villa, and regularly played in their Under-23s side, and eventually becoming captain. Hale was released by Aston Villa aged 20 and trialled at Sheffield United and West Brom before signing with Galway United.

=== Galway United ===
Galway United announced the signing of Hale in August 2017. Hale joined Derry City in January 2018.

=== Derry City ===
Hale joined Derry City in January 2018 along with his brother, Ronan. The brothers' grandfather is Derry City legend Danny Hale.

=== Crusaders ===
Hale joined NIFL Premiership side Crusaders in January 2019. His grandfather, Danny, also played for Crusaders, scoring over 100 goals. His great-uncle Gerry also played for the club. In 2019, Rory's brother Ronan also joined. In 2019, Hale won the Irish Cup with the Crues, and was an unused substitute in the final.

=== Cliftonville ===
Crusaders' North Belfast rivals Cliftonville signed Hale in 2021.

== International career ==
In 2014, Hale made two appearances for the Northern Ireland under-19 team. In 2019, he was called up to the Republic of Ireland under-21 team but did not make an appearance.

== Career statistics ==
=== Club ===
As of 13 August 2024

Appearances and goals by club, season and competition
Club	Season	League			National Cup		League Cup		Continental		Other		Total	
Club	Season	Division	Apps	Goals	Apps	Goals	Apps	Goals	Apps	Goals	Apps	Goals	Apps	Goals
Galway United	2017	League of Ireland Premier Division	8	1	1	0	1	0	—		—		10	1
Derry City	2018	League of Ireland Premier Division	32	2	1	0	4	1	2 (Note: Appearance(s) in UEFA Europa League)	0	—		39	3
Crusaders	2018-19	NIFL Premiership	11	0	3	0	—		—		—		14	0
Crusaders	2019-20	NIFL Premiership	19	2	0	0	3	0	4	0	—		26	2
Crusaders	2020-21	NIFL Premiership	4	0	—		—		—		—		4	0
Crusaders	Total		34	2	3	0	3	0	4	0	—		44	2
Cliftonville	2020-21	NIFL Premiership	28	4	2	0	—		—		—		30	4
Cliftonville	2021-22	NIFL Premiership	19	3	2	0	2	0	—		—		23	3
Cliftonville	2022-23	NIFL Premiership	36	7	3	1	3	1	2 (Note: Appearance(s) in UEFA Europa Conference League)	0	1 (Note: Appearance(s) in Scottish Challenge Cup)	0	45	9
Cliftonville	2023-24	NIFL Premiership	34	10	5	1	1	0	—		1	0	41	11
Cliftonville	2024-25	NIFL Premiership	0	0	—		—		0	0	1 (Note: Appearance(s) in NIFL Charity Shield)	0	1	0
Cliftonville	Total		117	24	12	2	6	1	2	0	3	0	140	27
Career Total			191	29	17	2	14	2	8	0	3	0	233	33

== Honours ==
Derry City

- League of Ireland Cup: 2018

Crusaders

- Irish Cup: 2018–19
- County Antrim Shield: 2018–19

Cliftonville

- Irish League Cup: 2021–22, 2024-25
- Irish Cup: 2023–24

Individual

- NIFL Premiership Team of the Year: 2023–24
- PFA NI Premiership Player of the Year: 2023–24
- Cliftonville FC Players' Player of the Year: 2023–24
- Cliftonville FC Player of the Year: 2023–24
