= Charlie Burns (footballer) =

English footballer

Personal information
- Full name: Charlie Peter John Burns
- Date of birth: 27 May 1995 (age 31)
- Place of birth: Croydon, England
- Height: 1.90 m (6 ft 3 in)
- Position: Goalkeeper

Team information
- Current team: Beaconsfield Town
- Number: 1

Youth career
- 2011–2014: Milton Keynes Dons

Senior career*
Years	Team	Apps	(Gls)
2014–2017	Milton Keynes Dons	5	(0)
2014	→ Cambridge City (loan)	2	(0)
2014–2015	→ Truro City (loan)	15	(0)
2016	→ Hayes & Yeading United (loan)	5	(0)
2017	Galway United	2	(0)
2018	Grays Athletic	4	(0)
2018	Hampton & Richmond Borough	1	(0)
2018	→ Kings Langley (loan)	7	(0)
2018	→ Metropolitan Police (loan)	5	(0)
2018	→ Bedfont Sports (loan)	?	(?)
2019	Hayes & Yeading United	0	(0)
2019–	Beaconsfield Town	0	(0)
- * Club domestic league appearances and goals as of 20 March 2019

Charlie Peter John Burns (born 27 May 1995) is an English footballer who plays as a goalkeeper who plays for Beaconsfield Town.

== Career ==
=== Milton Keynes Dons ===
Born in Croydon, Burns joined the youth system of Milton Keynes Dons as a sixteen-year-old in 2011 on a two-year scholarship. After completing his scholarship in the summer of 2013, Burns was told that he was free to find another club. However, the club then went on to reverse their decision and allowed Burns to complete a third year as a scholar.

==== 2013–14 ====
In May 2014, he made his professional debut for the club in a 3–1 defeat to Leyton Orient, replacing David Martin as a substitute. Burns then went on to sign his first professional contract on a one-year deal, with the option of a further year.

==== 2014–15 ====
In September 2014, Burns moved to Cambridge City on a month's loan as cover for the injured Zac Barrett and Richard Knight.

Burns then moved on loan to Truro City on an initial month's loan. which was then extended to the end of the season. He was recalled in February 2015 following injury to Milton Keynes Dons first choice David Martin.

==== 2015–16 ====
On 15 January 2016, Burns joined Southern Premier League side Hayes & Yeading United on an initial one-month loan. He went on to make five appearances for the club before being recalled to his parent club.

With injuries and suspensions affecting Milton Keynes Dons goalkeepers David Martin and Cody Cropper respectively, Burns featured for the first team in four Championship fixtures. On 19 April 2016, Burns achieved his first clean sheet for the club in a 0–0 draw with Sheffield Wednesday.

==== 2016–17 ====
On 2 May 2017, following a season without making an appearance for the club, Milton Keynes Dons announced that Burns had been released along with several other players.

=== Galway United ===
On 26 July 2017, Burns signed for League of Ireland Premier Division side Galway United until the end of the 2017 season.

=== Grays Athletic ===
Burns signed for Isthmian League North Division club Grays Athletic in January 2018.

=== Hampton & Richmond Borough ===
In July 2018, Burns signed for National League South club Hampton & Richmond Borough. On 16 August 2018 he was sent out on a one-month loan to Southern Football League Premier South club Kings Langley.

=== Hayes & Yeading United ===
Burns joined Hayes & Yeading United in January 2019.

=== Beaconsfield Town ===
I March 2019, Burns joined Beaconsfield Town.

== Career statistics ==
As of match played 30 August 2018.

Club statistics
Club	Season	League			National cup (Note: Includes FA Cup, FAI Cup)		League Cup (Note: Includes EFL Cup, League of Ireland Cup)		Other		Total	
Club	Season	Division	Apps	Goals	Apps	Goals	Apps	Goals	Apps	Goals	Apps	Goals
Milton Keynes Dons	2013–14	League One	1	0	0	0	0	0	0	0	1	0
Milton Keynes Dons	2014–15	League One	0	0	0	0	0	0	0	0	0	0
Milton Keynes Dons	2015–16	Championship	4	0	0	0	0	0	—		4	0
Milton Keynes Dons	2016-17	League One	0	0	0	0	0	0	0	0	0	0
Milton Keynes Dons	Total		5	0	0	0	0	0	0	0	5	0
Cambridge City (loan)	2014–15	Southern Premier	2	0	—		—		—		2	0
Truro City (loan)	2014–15	Southern Premier	13	0	—		—		—		13	0
Hayes & Yeading United (loan)	2015–16	Southern Premier	5	0	—		—		—		5	0
Galway United	2017	LOI Premier Division	0	0	1	0	1	0	—		2	0
Grays Athletic	2017–18	Isthmian League North	2	0	—		—		—		2	0
Hampton & Richmond Borough	2018–19	National League South	0	0	—		—		—		0	0
Kings Langley (loan)	2018–19	Southern Premier South	3	0	—		—		—		3	0
Metropolitan Police	2018–19	Southern Premier South	3	0	—		—		—		3	0
Career total			33	0	1	0	1	0	0	0	35	0
