= Iarfhlaith Davoren =

Irish footballer and coach

Personal information
- Full name: Iarfhlaith Davoren
- Date of birth: 12 May 1986 (age 40)
- Place of birth: Ballinasloe, Ireland
- Positions: Left back; winger

Youth career
- Tullamore Town
- Belvedere
- Willow Park

Senior career*
Years	Team	Apps	(Gls)
2004–2006	Athlone Town		
2006–2007	Galway United	3	(0)
2007	→ Institute (loan)	8	(2)
2008	Longford Town	11	(4)
2008–2009	Galway United	40	(1)
2010–2013	Sligo Rovers	128	(2)
2014	Cork City	14	(0)
2014	Sligo Rovers	9	(0)
2015–2016	Tulsa Roughnecks	40	(1)
2017	PSC		
2019	Galway United	7	(0)

International career
- Irish Universities
- * Club domestic league appearances and goals as of 4 October 2016

Iarfhlaith Davoren (born 12 May 1986) is an Irish former professional football player. He played as a left back or left winger. Davoren is a native of Tullamore, County Offaly.

== Youth ==
Davoren began his playing career with Tullamore Town before attracting attention from Belvedere in the Dublin District Schoolboys League (DDSL). Travelling to Dublin and school became problematic so Davoren moved to Willow Park Boys F.C. in the Athlone and District School boys league. The schoolboy club is noted for producing players for Athlone Town and Davoren became another name on the list when he signed at St. Mel's Park, making his first team debut against Dundalk in July 2004, at the age of 17.

He studied at NUI Galway.

== Career ==
=== Athlone Town ===
Davoren started his career with Athlone Town in the League of Ireland First Division in 2004.

=== Galway United ===
Iarfhlaith signed for Galway United in 2006. He made his debut in a 3–0 win against Finn Harps. In his fourth match for Galway United he scored his first goal for the club against Cobh Ramblers but made just three league appearances over the next eighteen months. He was sent on loan to Institute.

=== Longford Town ===
Davoren signed for Longford Town in 2008. His stay at Flancare was short and in July 2008 he returned to Galway United.

=== Galway United return ===
Davoren re-signed for Galway in 2008 and he played 11 games for Galway United over the rest of the 2008 season. Davoren played 16 league games during the 2009 season before he left the club for Sligo Rovers.

=== Sligo Rovers ===
Davoren and joined Sligo Rovers at the start of the 2010 season on a free transfer. After struggling with injuries early in his time at the Showgrounds Davoren settled quickly and firmly established himself as left back in the Rovers side and started the last 30 games of the season consecutively. This included playing in the victorious EA Sports Cup and FAI Cup finals giving a fantastic energetic display in the latter. He continued well into the 2011 season playing the first 23 games until sustaining an injury against Bohemians that broke his run of 53 consecutive starts. Davoren scored the equalizing goal in the 2011 FAI Cup Final forcing the game to extratime and penalties.

=== Hibernian trial ===
Davoren went on trial with Scottish Premier League club Hibernian in December 2011.

=== Cork City ===
Davoren signed for Cork City in April 2014. Davoren made his debut for Cork City in a league game against his former club, Sligo Rovers on 11 April 2014. Davoren left Cork City on 30 July 2014. He rejoined his former club Sligo Rovers the following day.

=== Return to Galway United ===
In January 2019, Davoren linked up with former team-mate Alan Murphy by signing for Galway United for the 2019 season in the League of Ireland First Division as a player-coach. He was returning to the club despite a decade having passed from his last appearance for the club.

=== International ===
Davoren has also represented Ireland at university level whilst studying at NUI Galway.

== Honours ==
Sligo Rovers

- League of Ireland (1): 2012
- FAI Cup (3): 2010, 2011, 2013
- League of Ireland Cup (1): 2010
