= Ronan Murray (footballer) =

Irish footballer (born 1991)

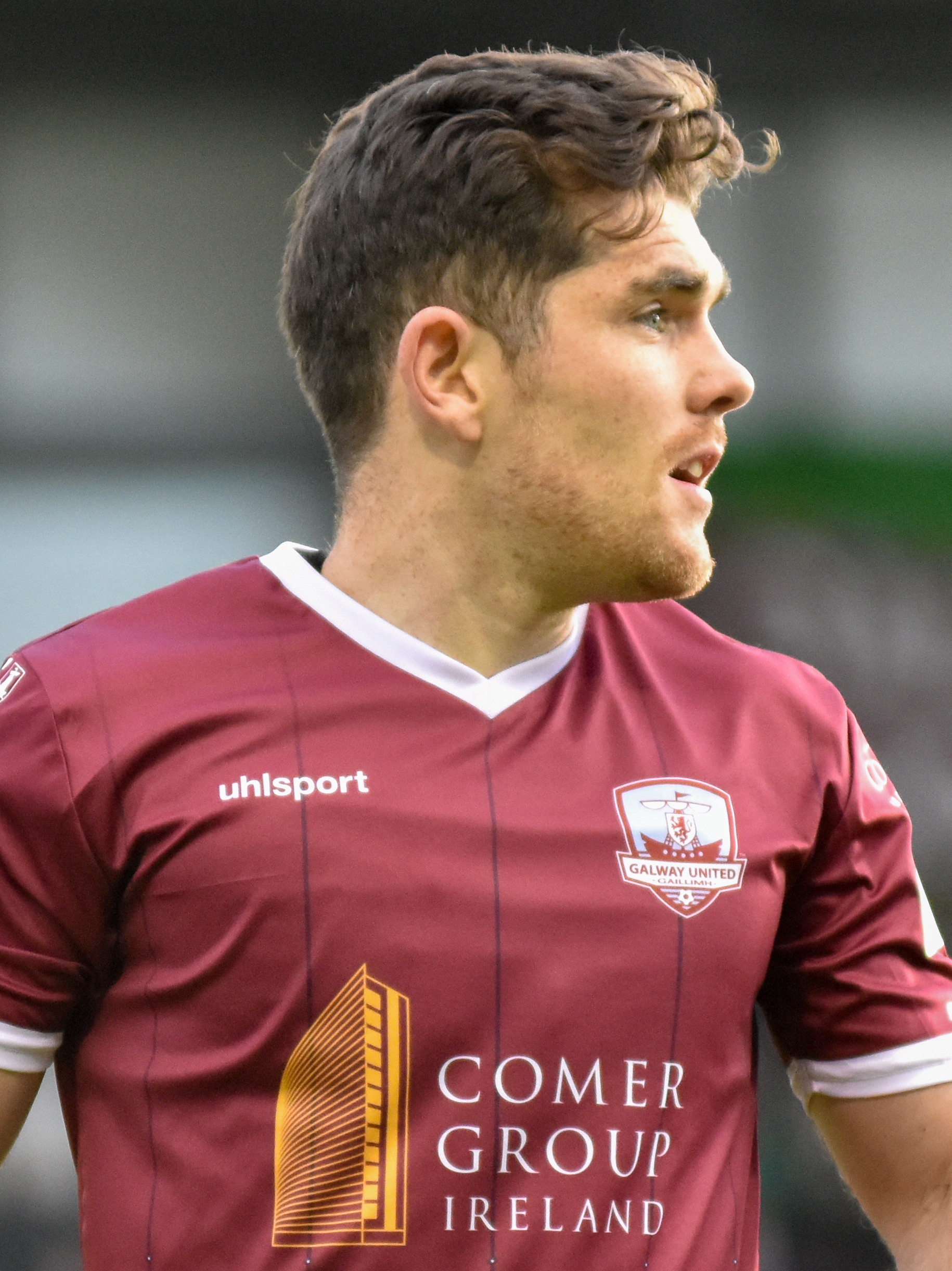
- Murray playing for Galway United in 2017

Personal information
- Full name: Ronan Michael Murray
- Date of birth: 12 September 1991 (age 35)
- Place of birth: Belmullet, County Mayo, Ireland
- Height: 5 ft 7 in (1.70 m)
- Position: Forward

Team information
- Current team: Dundalk

Youth career
- 2003–2008: Erris United
- 2008–2010: Ipswich Town

Senior career*
Years	Team	Apps	(Gls)
2010–2013	Ipswich Town	9	(0)
2011	→ Torquay United (loan)	7	(1)
2011–2012	→ Swindon Town (loan)	20	(3)
2013	→ Plymouth Argyle (loan)	13	(1)
2013–2016	Notts County	60	(9)
2017	Galway United	32	(13)
2018	Dundalk	23	(3)
2019–2020	Sligo Rovers	29	(2)
2021	Drogheda United	27	(1)
2025	Dundalk	0	(0)
Total		220	(33)

International career
2005–2006	Republic of Ireland U15		
2006–2007	Republic of Ireland U16		
2008–2009	Republic of Ireland U18		
2009–2010	Republic of Ireland U19	13	(2)
2011	Republic of Ireland U21	1	(0)
- * Club domestic league appearances and goals as of 15 September 2022

Ronan Michael Murray (born 12 September 1991) is an Irish footballer who plays as a forward. He is currently a player/coach at Dundalk in the League of Ireland Premier Division. Born in County Mayo, he has also played in the Football League for Ipswich Town, Torquay United, Swindon Town, Plymouth Argyle and Notts County, and in the League of Ireland for Galway United, Sligo Rovers and Drogheda United. Murray was capped by the Republic of Ireland from under-16 to under-21 level. He has also played Gaelic football with Belmullet GAA.

== Club career ==
=== Early years ===
Murray started playing for the Erris United youth system at the age of 12. After being spotted by former Ipswich Town player Robin Turner, he had a trial with Ipswich in the summer of 2007 and agreed to join the club the following year.

=== Ipswich Town ===
Having joined the club's academy, Murray scored a total of 36 goals in 56 appearances for the youth team in his first two seasons with Ipswich. He also scored 13 times in 29 reserve team games. Murray signed his first professional contract in 2010 after being among seven academy players offered terms in April. He scored on his first team debut in a 3–2 League Cup win at Exeter City in August. Murray came on as a second-half substitute, with Ipswich trailing, to equalise with a "looping header" and was then involved in both David Norris goals to win the game in extra time. "Of all the strikers at our club, he is probably the most natural goalscorer we've got," said manager Roy Keane. Describing Murray's goal, he said "it wasn't even a chance and that's what good strikers do."

Murray made his first appearance in the Football League four days later against Burnley, but found first team opportunities limited for the rest of the 2010–11 campaign. He continued to be prolific for the reserves, scoring 11 goals in 16 appearances that season, and joined Torquay United on loan in March 2011. He scored once in seven appearances, a "clinical finish" against Cheltenham Town, and was then recalled by manager Paul Jewell in April. "I really enjoyed my time at Torquay but I'm an Ipswich Town player and want to play games here," said Murray after signing a new one-year contract. He appeared in the starting line-up for the first time, in his last game of the season, at the end of the month against Preston North End.

Despite scoring nine goals in 10 reserve team appearances the following season, Murray failed to feature in a first team game for Ipswich in 2011–12. A loan move to Gillingham in September fell through before he joined Swindon Town on loan in November. "To be honest, we are missing a player like him," said Swindon manager Paolo Di Canio. "He's a player who doesn't have a high size but he's very mobile. He's quick but he isn't nasty – he has a good character." Murray scored two goals in ten league and cup appearances, against Southend United and Morecambe, before returning to Ipswich in January. Ipswich rejected an offer of around £100,000 from Swindon to sign Murray on a permanent deal and gave him a new one-year contract. He then returned to Swindon on loan for the rest of the season. "I'm obviously delighted to have been given a new contract here," said Murray. "It's been great to be involved down there week after week and that's what I need at this stage of my career." He scored two more goals, against Burton Albion and Barnet, and appeared in the 2012 Football League Trophy Final defeat to Chesterfield.

Murray returned to Ipswich at the end of the campaign having helped Swindon win the League Two title. "I reckon this is my first season as a regular in the Football League and I am in a team that has won promotion," he said. "I have learnt that you have to be professional in your preparation, especially if you have a game on Saturday and then Tuesday. You have to recover well and I have learnt how to do that too." He made his first appearance for Ipswich in nearly 16 months at the start of the 2012–13 season against Blackpool in August. Murray scored four more goals, in eight appearances, for the club's reserve team before joining Plymouth Argyle on loan in January for the rest of the campaign. "I'm very pleased to get Ronan in. He comes very highly recommended," said Argyle manager John Sheridan. "He's a good intelligent footballer who scores goals and he did well when he went to Swindon last year in a promotion-winning side." Murray scored one goal in 13 appearances for the club, a "close-range finish" against Barnet in March. At the end of the season, Murray was released by Ipswich when his contract expired. In five years with the club he scored once in 14 matches.

=== Notts County ===
Murray signed a short-term contract with Notts County in August 2013 after a trial period. He made an impressive start at his new club, scoring 9 goals as the team avoided relegation to League Two, and his performances earned him a new contract in July 2014. His time at Notts County was beset by injury problems, with a fractured pubic bone proving particularly problematic. Despite this, Murray still featured in 68 games for the EFL side. He left Notts County in July 2016 when his contract expired.

=== Galway United ===
Murray returned to his native west of Ireland when he signed for Galway United in December 2016 ahead of the 2017 League of Ireland Premier Division campaign. Murray scored 13 goals in 32 league games for Galway United, including 3 in the month of August, picking up the League of Ireland Player of the Month award, but he couldn't save them from relegation in the restructured league of 10 clubs.

=== Dundalk ===
Following his impressive season in Galway, on 28 November 2017 it was announced that Murray would make a return to full time football by joining league champions Dundalk for the 2018 campaign. He scored a brace on his club debut against Cork City in the President's Cup on 11 February. It proved to be a tough year for Murray personally. Despite the club retaining the 2018 League of Ireland Premier Division and winning the 2018 FAI Cup, he only started 11 league games, and wasn't getting as many minutes on the pitch as were desired. He admitted that he had a decision to make in the close season. He left the club having scored 9 goals in 32 appearances in all competitions

=== Sligo Rovers ===
On 26 November 2018, Murray signed a 2-year contract with Sligo Rovers for the 2019 League of Ireland Premier Division season. He struggled to break into the first team, and after just 2 goals in 33 games, he departed in December 2020

=== Drogheda United ===
After a brief trial with Saint Patrick's Athletic, On 24 February 2021 newly promoted side Drogheda United announced the signing of Murray for the 2021 season. He scored his first goal for the club, a smashing free kick, in a friendly fixture against his former side Dundalk in the Louth derby on 6 March. Murray was a regular in the side that season, playing 27 league matches. His only Premier Division goal came in the form of another free kick, against Longford Town on 24 May. He left the club upon expiry of his 1-year contract in December

==== Career Break ====
After leaving the Drogs, Ronan Murray took a career break from football, and explored other ventures, taking up Gaelic football with his local club Belmullet back in County Mayo.

==== Return to Dundalk ====
On 23 December 2024 it was announced that Ronan Murray had rejoined Dundalk FC as strength and conditioning coach. On 26 October, he was named in the teamsheet for the Leinster Senior Cup final against Saint Patrick's Athletic. He came on as a second-half substitute, almost four years after his last appearance in professional football, as Dundalk won 1-2 and lifted the trophy.

== International career ==
Murray represented the Republic of Ireland at under-16, under-18, under-19 and under-21 level. He made his debut for the under-21 team in March 2011 against Portugal.

== Career statistics ==
As of match played on 26 October 2025

Appearances and goals by club, season and competition
Club	Season	League			National Cup		League Cup		Other		Total	
Club	Season	Division	Apps	Goals	Apps	Goals	Apps	Goals	Apps	Goals	Apps	Goals
Ipswich Town	2010–11	Championship	8	0	1	0	4	1	—		13	1
Ipswich Town	2011–12	Championship	0	0	0	0	0	0	—		0	0
Ipswich Town	2012–13	Championship	1	0	0	0	0	0	—		1	0
Ipswich Town	Total		9	0	1	0	4	1	0	0	14	1
Torquay United (loan)	2010–11	League Two	7	1	0	0	0	0	0	0	7	1
Swindon Town (loan)	2011–12	League Two	20	3	3	0	0	0	4 (Note: Appearance(s) in Football League Trophy)	1	27	4
Plymouth Argyle (loan)	2012–13	League Two	13	1	0	0	0	0	0	0	13	1
Notts County	2013–14	League One	24	7	1	1	0	0	1	1	26	9
Notts County	2014–15	League One	20	1	2	1	1	0	3	2	26	4
Notts County	2015–16	League Two	16	1	0	0	0	0	0	0	16	1
Notts County	Total		60	9	3	2	1	0	4	3	68	14
Galway United	2017	League of Ireland Premier Division	32	13	3	3	3	1	—		38	17
Dundalk	2018	League of Ireland Premier Division	23	3	3	3	3	1	5 (Note: Appearances in UEFA Europa League, Leinster Senior Cup and President of Ireland's Cup)	4	34	11
Sligo Rovers	2019	League of Ireland Premier Division	21	1	3	0	1	0	—		25	1
Sligo Rovers	2020	League of Ireland Premier Division	8	1	0	0	0	0	—		8	1
Sligo Rovers	Total		29	2	3	0	1	0	0	0	33	2
Drogheda United	2021	League of Ireland Premier Division	27	1	0	0	—		—		27	1
Dundalk	2025	League of Ireland First Division	0	0	0	0	—		1 (Note: Appearances in Leinster Senior Cup)	0	1	0
Career total			220	33	16	8	12	3	14	8	262	52

== Honours ==
Swindon Town

- Football League Two: 2011–12
- Football League Trophy runner-up: 2011–12

Dundalk

- League of Ireland Premier Division: 2018
- Leinster Senior Cup: 2024–25

Individual

- PFAI Team of the Year: 2017 Premier Division
