= Christopher Horgan =

Irish footballer (born 1999)

Personal information
- Date of birth: 27 October 1999 (age 27)
- Place of birth: Galway, Ireland
- Position: Right-back

Youth career
- Salthill Devon
- 2017–2018: Galway United

Senior career*
Years	Team	Apps	(Gls)
2018–2021	Galway United	50	(0)
2024–2025	Treaty United	13	(0)
- * Club domestic league appearances and goals

Christopher Horgan (born 27 October 1999) is an Irish former professional footballer who played as a Right-back.

Horgan played youth football with Salthill Devon before starting his professional career with Galway United. Following a career break he would spend time playing for Treaty United.

== Career ==
=== Galway United ===
On 6 July 2018, Horgan made his debut for League of Ireland First Division club Galway United, as did teammates Adam Rooney and Wilson Waweru in a 4–1 win over Athlone Town in Alan Murphy's first game as Galway United manager. He made his first start 3 weeks later where he, at the age of 18, played the full 90 minutes in a 3–2 over Cabinteely at Eamonn Deacy Park. On 13 December 2018, Horgan signed his first senior contract with the club ahead of the 2019 season. At the end of the 2020 season the club made the play-offs on the final day, during which they would defeat Bray Wanderers in the semi-final, before losing to Longford Town in the final.

At the end of the 2021 season Galway Unitewd made it to the play-offs again where they lost 0–1 to Bray Wanderers over two-legs. At the end of that season Horgan departed the club to study in Belgium.

=== Treaty United ===
On 26 July 2024, Horgan signed for League of Ireland First Division club Treaty United, halfway through the 2024 season. On 26 February 2025, Horgan re-signed for the Limerick club for the 2025 season, before departing the club on 28 January 2026.

== Personal life ==
Horgan is the youngest of four brothers, the oldest of whom, Daryl Horgan, is a former Republic of Ireland international. His brothers Colm Horgan and Kevin Horgan are also former Galway United players.

== Career statistics ==
=== Club ===
Appearances and goals by club, season and competition
Club	Season	League			National cup (Note: Includes FAI Cup)		League cup (Note: Includes League of Ireland Cup)		Total	
Club	Season	Division	Apps	Goals	Apps	Goals	Apps	Goals	Apps	Goals
Galway United	2018	LOI First Division	6	0	2	0	0	0	8	0
Galway United	2019	LOI First Division	24	0	3	0	1	0	28	0
Galway United	2020	LOI First Division	7	0	1	0	0	0	8	0
Galway United	2021	LOI First Division	13	0	1	0	—		14	0
Galway United	Total		50	0	7	0	1	0	58	0
Treaty United	2024	LOI First Division	9	0	2	0	—		11	0
Treaty United	2025	LOI First Division	4	0	0	0	—		4	0
Treaty United	Total		13	0	2	0	0	0	15	0
Career total			63	0	9	0	1	0	73	0
