= Kevin Horgan =

Irish footballer (born 1997)

Personal information
- Date of birth: 26 April 1997 (age 29)
- Place of birth: Galway, Ireland
- Height: 1.92 m (6 ft 4 in)
- Position: Goalkeeper

Youth career
- –2014: Salthill Devon

Senior career*
Years	Team	Apps	(Gls)
2014–2015	Salthill Devon		
2015–2016	Galway United	4	(0)
2017–2018	Shamrock Rovers	17	(0)
2019–2021	Galway United	34	(0)
Total		55	(0)
- * Club domestic league appearances and goals

Kevin Horgan (born 26 April 1997) is an Irish former professional footballer who played as a goalkeeper.

Horgan played youth football with Salthill Devon and is best known for his time in the League of Ireland during his stint Shamrock Rovers and his two stints with Galway United.

== Career ==
=== Galway United ===
In June 2015, Horgan was signed by League of Ireland Premier Division club Galway United. Horgan did not get much game time in his first spell with the club as he was competing with both Conor Winn and Ger Hanley for a starting spot. On 30 October 2015, Horgan made his debut for the club, coming on as a substitute in a 0–1 defeat to St Patrick's Athletic at Eamonn Deacy Park.

On 21 March 2016, Horgan made his first start for the club in the League of Ireland Cup in a first round match against the Mayo League. On 1 April, Horgan made his first league start for the club, away at Tallaght Stadium against Shamrock Rovers.

=== Shamrock Rovers ===
On 15 December 2016, Horgan was signed by Shamrock Rovers anlongside fellow goalkeeper Tomer Chencinski, ahead of the 2017 season. On 17 April 2017, Horgan made his debut for the club against rivals Bohemians in the Dublin derby in the League of Ireland Cup.

Horgan re-signed for the club for the 2018 season. Horgan won Shamrock Rovers' Player of the Month for April 2018.

=== Return to Galway United ===
On 10 February 2019, Horgan made his return to League of Ireland First Division club Galway United. Horgan was Galway's starting keeper for the 2019 season as Galway finished 7th in the league.

In the 2020 season Horgan played a majority of Galway's in games the truncated season as a result of the COVID-19 pandemic, as they made the play-offs. Micheál Schlingermann started over Horgan as they lost to Longford Town.

Horgan re-signed for the 2021 season, however he didn't play a game before departing halfway through the season.

== Personal life ==
Horgan has three brothers who have all also played in the League of Ireland. His brother Daryl Horgan currently plays for Dundalk and is a former Republic of Ireland international, and his brothers Colm Horgan and Christopher Horgan are both (like Kevin) former Galway United players.

== Career statistics ==
=== Club ===
Appearances and goals by club, season and competition
Club	Season	League			National cup (Note: Includes FAI Cup)		League cup (Note: Includes League of Ireland Cup)		Total	
Club	Season	Division	Apps	Goals	Apps	Goals	Apps	Goals	Apps	Goals
Galway United	2015	LOI Premier Division	1	0	0	0	0	0	1	0
Galway United	2016	LOI Premier Division	3	0	0	0	3	0	6	0
Galway United	Total		4	0	0	0	3	0	7	0
Shamrock Rovers	2017	LOI Premier Division	4	0	0	0	2	0	6	0
Shamrock Rovers	2018	LOI Premier Division	13	0	0	0	0	0	13	0
Shamrock Rovers	Total		17	0	0	0	2	0	19	0
Galway United	2019	LOI First Division	21	0	3	0	0	0	24	0
Galway United	2020	LOI First Division	13	0	0	0	0	0	13	0
Galway United	2021	LOI First Division	0	0	0	0	—		0	0
Galway United	Total		34	0	3	0	0	0	37	0
Career total			55	0	3	0	5	0	63	0
