= Ciaran Nugent =

American soccer player (born 1991)

Personal information
- Date of birth: October 27, 1991 (age 35)
- Place of birth: Dedham, Massachusetts, United States
- Height: 1.86 m (6 ft 1 in)
- Position: Goalkeeper

Youth career
- Boston Bolts

College career
Years	Team	Apps	(Gls)
2010–2014	Lehigh Mountain Hawks		

Senior career*
Years	Team	Apps	(Gls)
2012	Portland Phoenix	14	(0)
2013	Reading United AC	3	(0)
2014	Real Boston Rams	2	(0)
2015	Harrisburg City Islanders	1	(0)
2016	Sligo Rovers	8	(0)
2017	Galway United	2	(0)
- * Club domestic league appearances and goals as of March 25, 2020

Ciaran Nugent (born October 27, 1991) is an American soccer player who last played for Irish side Galway United in the League of Ireland Premier Division.

== Soccer career ==
=== College and amateur ===
Nugent began playing college soccer at Lehigh University in 2010, where he played for four years, as well as red-shirted year in 2013.

While at college, Nugent appeared for USL PDL sides Portland Phoenix in 2012, Reading United AC in 2013, and Real Boston Rams in 2014, .

=== Professional career ===
Nugent signed with United Soccer League club Harrisburg City Islanders, affiliate of MLS side, the Philadelphia Union, on April 2, 2015.

On January 27, 2016, Nugent signed for Sligo Rovers in the League of Ireland Premier Division making over 9 starts, 7 clean sheets and 12 professional appearances.

On 17 January 2017, Nugent signed for Galway United in the League of Ireland Premier Division. On 14 June 2017, Nugent departed Galway United halfway through the 2017 season.
