= Chris Lyons =

American tech executive

Chris Lyons is an American venture capitalist and technology executive, best known as a General Partner at Andreessen Horowitz (a16z), where he leads the Cultural Leadership Fund (CLF). Lyons is recognized for his influence in Silicon Valley, bridging the worlds of technology, media, and culture.

== Career ==
Lyons began his career in music before joining Andreessen Horowitz, where he served as Chief of Staff to Ben Horowitz. In 2018, Lyons launched the Cultural Leadership Fund at a16z, attracting high-profile investors from the worlds of entertainment, sports, and business. Lyons has been recognized for his efforts to bridge the gap between technology and culture and to advance diversity in Silicon Valley.
