= Lee Grace =

Republic of Ireland footballer

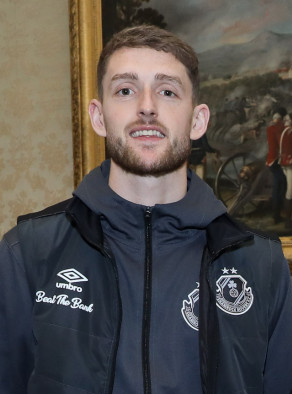
- Grace in 2024.

Personal information
- Full name: Lee Grace
- Date of birth: 1 December 1992 (age 33)
- Place of birth: Carrick-on-Suir, Ireland
- Height: 1.88 m (6 ft 2 in)
- Position: Defender

Team information
- Current team: Shamrock Rovers
- Number: 5

Senior career*
Years	Team	Apps	(Gls)
2015–2016	Wexford	45	(0)
2017	Galway United	24	(1)
2017–	Shamrock Rovers	250	(11)
- * Club domestic league appearances and goals as of 17:01, 9 November 2026 (UTC)

Lee Grace (born 1 December 1992) is an Irish professional footballer who plays as a defender for League of Ireland Premier Division club Shamrock Rovers.

== Career ==
Grace played for Wexford during the 2015 League of Ireland First Division season, where he made 24 appearances, and the 2016 League of Ireland Premier Division season, where he made 21 appearances.

In August 2017 Grace signed for Shamrock Rovers.

Grace scored against Apollon Limassol in a 2019–20 UEFA Europa League clash but was sent off in the away leg.

== Career statistics ==
As of match played 30 October 2026

Appearances and goals by club, season and competition
Club	Season	League			National cup		League cup		Continental		Other		Total	
Club	Season	Division	Apps	Goals	Apps	Goals	Apps	Goals	Apps	Goals	Apps	Goals	Apps	Goals
Wexford	2015	LOI First Division	24	0	0	0	1	0	—		—		25	0
Wexford	2016	LOI Premier Division	21	0	1	0	0	0	—		2 (Note: Appearances in the Premier Division relegation playoff)	0	24	0
Wexford	Total		45	0	1	0	1	0	0	0	2	0	49	0
Galway United	2017	LOI Premier Division	24	1	0	0	2	0	—		—		26	1
Shamrock Rovers	2017	LOI Premier Division	8	0	3	0	0	0	—		—		11	0
Shamrock Rovers	2018	LOI Premier Division	35	1	0	0	0	0	2 (Note: Appearances in the UEFA Europa League)	0	—		38	1
Shamrock Rovers	2019	LOI Premier Division	34	1	3	1	1	0	4	1	—		42	3
Shamrock Rovers	2020	LOI Premier Division	17	1	4	0	—		1	0	—		22	1
Shamrock Rovers	2021	LOI Premier Division	29	1	0	0	—		4 (Note: 2 appearances in the UEFA Champions League and 2 appearances in the UEFA Europa Conference League)	0	0	0	33	1
Shamrock Rovers	2022	LOI Premier Division	30	0	2	0	—		13 (Note: 4 appearances in the UEFA Champions League, 4 appearances in the UEFA Europa League and 5 appearances in the UEFA Europa Conference League)	0	1 (Note: Appearance in the President of Ireland's Cup)	0	46	0
Shamrock Rovers	2023	LOI Premier Division	27	4	1	0	—		2 (Note: 1 appearance in the UEFA Champions League and 1 appearance in the UEFA Europa Conference League)	0	1	0	31	4
Shamrock Rovers	2024	LOI Premier Division	18	0	0	0	—		12 (Note: 3 appearances in the UEFA Champions League, 3 appearances in the UEFA Europa League & 6 appearances in the UEFA Conference League)	0	1	0	31	0
Shamrock Rovers	2025	LOI Premier Division	23	3	4	0	—		12 (Note: 2 appearances in the 2024–25 UEFA Conference League campaign; 10 appearances in the 2025–26 UEFA Conference League campaign)	0	0	0	39	3
Shamrock Rovers	2026	LOI Premier Division	29	0	2	0	—		7 (Note: 4 appearances, 1 goal in the UEFA Champions League; 1 appearance in the UEFA Europa League; 2 appearances in the UEFA Conference League)	1	0	0	38	1
Shamrock Rovers	Total		250	11	19	1	1	0	57	2	3	0	328	14
Career Total			319	12	20	1	4	0	57	2	5	0	405	15

== Honours ==
Shamrock Rovers

- League of Ireland Premier Division: 2020, 2021, 2022, 2023, 2025, 2026
- FAI Cup: 2019, 2025
- President of Ireland's Cup: 2022, 2024
