= Armin Aganovic =

Swedish footballer (born 1994)

Personal information
- Date of birth: 6 April 1994 (age 32)
- Place of birth: Kristianstad, Sweden
- Height: 1.87 m (6 ft 2 in)
- Position: Defender

Senior career*
Years	Team	Apps	(Gls)
2013–2015	Mjällby AIF	18	(0)
2014	→ Kristianstad FC (loan)	24	(7)
2016	Galway United	18	(0)
2017	Raufoss IL	17	(5)
2018	Derry City	2	(1)
2018–2019	Kristianstad FC	54	(7)
2020	FK Karlskrona	19	(3)
2021–2023	Nosaby IF	69	(6)
2024–2026	Kristianstad FC	46	(7)
- * Club domestic league appearances and goals

Armin Aganovic (born 6 April 1994) is a Swedish former professional footballer who played as a defender.

== Early life ==
Aganovic represented Skåne County at the 2010 Cup Byggnads, helping the team achieve the semifinals. He has an older brother.

== Career ==
Aganovic started his career with Swedish side Mjällby AIF. In 2014, he was sent on loan to Swedish side Kristianstad FC. In 2016, he signed for Irish side Galway United. He became the first foreign player to sign for an Irish side after playing in a FIFPRO tournament. In 2017, he signed for Norwegian side Raufoss IL. In 2018, he signed for Northern Irish side Derry City. He was described as "kick-started his spell under Kenny Shiels with a goal against Waterford on his debut but played a peripheral role thereafter". In 2018, he returned to Swedish side Kristianstad FC. He captained the club. In 2020, he signed for Swedish side FK Karlskrona. In 2021, he signed for Swedish side Nosaby IF. In 2024, he returned to Swedish side Kristianstad FC.

== Style of play ==
Aganovic mainly operates as a defender. He is known for his leadership ability.

== Personal life ==
Aganovic is a native of Kristianstad, Sweden. He is of Bosnia and Herzegovina descent.
