= Shane Keegan =

Irish football manager (born 1981)

Personal information
- Full name: Shane Keegan
- Date of birth: 10 December 1981 (age 44)
- Place of birth: Portlaoise, Laois, Ireland
- Height: 5 ft 6 in (1.68 m)

Managerial career
- Years: Team
- 2010–2011: FC Carlow
- 2012–2016: Wexford Youths
- 2017–2018: Galway United
- 2021: Dundalk
- 2022–2023: Cobh Ramblers

Shane Keegan is an Irish football manager who has previously managed FC Carlow, Wexford Youths, Galway United, Dundalk and Cobh Ramblers.

In November 2016, Keegan was announced as Manager of Galway United F.C. on a two-year contract, joining from Wexford Youths F.C., where he spent five seasons in charge. His departure from Wexford came in controversial circumstances as the news broke just before the away leg of a relegation play off to Drogheda which they subsequently lost after having been 2.0 up in the first leg.

Keegan's first season in charge of Galway United resulted in the club being relegated from the League of Ireland Premier Division. That same season he guided his side to the semi-final of the EA Sports Cup where they lost 3-0 to Dundalk. His side also made it to the quarter-finals of the FAI Cup but were beaten 2-1 by Limerick. His contract with Galway was not renewed at the end of the two year term following a very disappointing season.

In March 2021, Keegan was named as first-team manager of Dundalk F.C., replacing Filippo Giovagnoli who stepped back to the position of coach. He resigned as manager one month later after a disastrous run of results.

Keegan was appointed manager of League of Ireland First Division side Cobh Ramblers F.C. on 27 June 2022, on a contract until the end of the 2023 season. He guided the club to third place in the 2023 season, before departing the club on 7 December 2023 due to work commitments.

== Honours ==
=== Manager ===
Wexford Youths

- League of Ireland First Division (1): 2015

Dundalk

- President's Cup (1): 2021

Cobh Ramblers

- Munster Senior Cup (1): 2023
