= Josh Giurgi =

Irish footballer

Personal information
- Full name: Joshua Alexander Harsani Giurgi
- Date of birth: 18 June 2002 (age 24)
- Place of birth: Dublin, Ireland
- Height: 1.76 m (5 ft 9 in)
- Position: Winger

Team information
- Current team: Maynooth Town

Youth career
- Leixlip United
- –2022: Norwich City

Senior career*
Years	Team	Apps	(Gls)
2022	Shelbourne	7	(0)
2023	Longford Town	33	(5)
2024	Maynooth Town	5	(0)
2025	Longford Town	18	(2)
2026–	Maynooth Town	2	(0)

International career^{‡}
2018–2019	Republic of Ireland U17	9	(2)
2019	Republic of Ireland U18	1	(0)
- * Club domestic league appearances and goals as of 11 June 2026 ‡ National team caps and goals as of 9 May 2019

Josh Giurgi (born 18 June 2002) is an Irish professional footballer who plays as a winger for Maynooth Town. Giurgi was born in Republic of Ireland to Romanian parents.
