= Colm Horgan =

Irish footballer (born 1994)

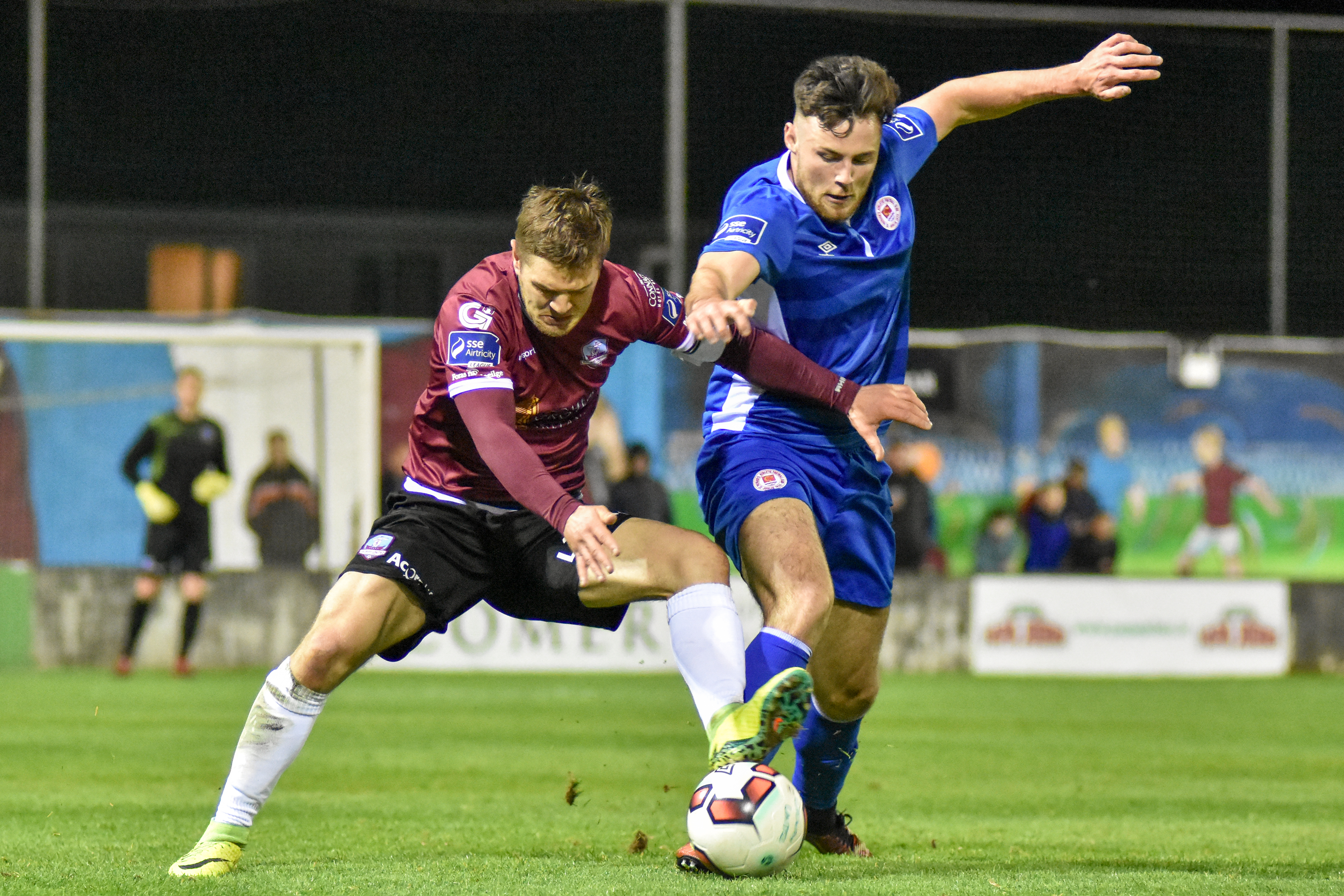
- Colm Horgan (left) playing for Galway United against Josh O'Hanlon of St Patrick's Athletic in 2017

Personal information
- Full name: Colm Horgan
- Date of birth: 2 July 1994 (age 32)
- Place of birth: Galway, Ireland
- Height: 1.77 m (5 ft 10 in)
- Position: Fullback

Youth career
- –2011: Salthill Devon

Senior career*
Years	Team	Apps	(Gls)
2010–2013	Salthill Devon	61	(0)
2014–2017	Galway United	122	(2)
2018–2019	Cork City	39	(1)
2020	Derry City	11	(0)
2021–2022	Sligo Rovers	48	(1)
2023–2025	Galway United	44	(1)
- * Club domestic league appearances and goals as of 15:15, 5 February 2026 (UTC)

Colm Horgan (born 2 July 1994) is an Irish professional footballer who plays as a fullback. He previously played for Salthill Devon, Galway United, Cork City, Derry City and Sligo Rovers.

== Career ==
=== Youth career ===
Galway man Horgan began playing football with the academy of then local League of Ireland club Salthill Devon, where he was a regular right up to under-19 level.

=== Salthill Devon ===
Horgan made his first team debut for Salthill Devon on his 16th birthday, 2 July 2010, coming off the bench in the 72nd minute of a 2–0 loss away to Monaghan United at Gortakeegan, in which he played alongside his brother Daryl Horgan who also came off the bench. He went on to make a total of 9 appearances in the second half of the season, including in both legs of the all-important 2010 League of Ireland First Division Promotion/Relegation Playoffs as his side beat Cobh Ramblers home and away to maintain their place in the League of Ireland First Division. The side finished bottom of the league in each of his 4 senior seasons at the club, but he gained significant experience at a young age by making a total of 67 appearances in all competitions during his time there.

=== Galway United ===
After Salthill Devon pulled out of the League of Ireland First Division, Horgan signed for the newly reformed Galway United side set to take their place in the division from 2014 onwards. He scored the first senior goal of his career on 16 August 2014 in a 2–1 win away to Longford Town. On 31 October 2014, he was part of the team that defeated UCD 3–0 at Eamonn Deacy Park in the 2014 League of Ireland Promotion/Relegation Playoffs to secure promotion back to the top flight for the club. At the end of the season, was voted into the PFAI First Division Team of the Year for 2014 by his fellow professionals across the league. On 22 November 2014, he extended his contract. On 19 September 2015, Horgan was part of the Galway side that took on St Patrick's Athletic in the 2015 League of Ireland Cup final at Eamonn Deacy Park but was defeated on penalties despite scoring his penalty in the shootout. He signed a new contract with the club on 28 October 2015. On 30 October 2015, he played alongside his brother Kevin for the first time at senior level, as he made his senior debut for the club in goals in a 1–0 loss to St Patrick's Athletic. On 21 November 2016, he signed a new contract with the club, after helping the team to avoid the Releagtion Playoff place by 2 points during the 2016 season. He was named club captain on 27 January 2017. On 28 October 2017, he was part of the side that were defeated 4–3 at home to Dundalk, which resulted in the club being relegated to the League of Ireland First Division.

=== Cork City ===
On 9 November 2017, he signed a 2-year contract with League of Ireland Premier Division champions Cork City. On 11 February he made his debut for the club in the 2018 President of Ireland's Cup as his side defeated Dundalk 4–2 at Oriel Park. His first goal for the club came on 20 April 2018, in a 2–0 win away to Bohemians at Dalymount Park. He picked up an injury in a 2–1 defeat away to Dundalk on 29 June 2018 that would rule him out for the rest of the season, missing out on his side's European fixtures as well as their run to the 2019 FAI Cup final at the end of the season. On 22 March 2019, he was part of the side that won the 2018–19 Munster Senior Cup by beating Midleton 3–1 in the final at Turners Cross. He made the first European appearances of his career in July 2019, playing at home and away in his side's UEFA Europa League tie against Progrès Niederkorn of Luxembourg as they were defeated 3–2 on aggregate.

=== Derry City ===
On 21 January 2020, Horgan signed for fellow League of Ireland Premier Division club Derry City. He made just 14 appearances in all competitions during his time with the club as the season was halved due to COVID-19 restrictions.

=== Sligo Rovers ===
On 7 February 2021, he signed for Sligo Rovers. Horgan scored his first goal for the club on 25 February 2022, opening the scoring in a 2–1 win over St Patrick's Athletic at Richmond Park. He made 52 appearances in his 2 seasons with the club.

=== Return to Galway United ===
On 20 January 2023, Horgan returned to his hometown club Galway United in the League of Ireland First Division. He stated that he wanted to rejoin the club to help them gain promotion, having been club captain when they were relegated in 2017. On 24 April 2023, he scored his first goal since returning to the club, in a 4–1 win away to Kerry. On 22 September 2023, the team secured promoted back to the Premier Division by winning the 2023 League of Ireland First Division title following a 4–0 win over Kerry at Mounthawk Park. He made 15 appearances in all competitions in the club's first year back in the League of Ireland Premier Division in 2024.

== Personal life ==
Horgan comes from a footballing family, being the second oldest of 4 boys that have all played professionally. His older brother Daryl Horgan is a former Republic of Ireland international and the two played together at Salthill Devon. Colm also played with his younger brother Kevin Horgan, who was a goalkeeper, at Galway United. The youngest is Christopher Horgan, who has played in the League of Ireland with Treaty United.

== Career statistics ==
As of match played on 1 November 2025

Appearances and goals by club, season and competition
Club	Season	League			National Cup (Note: Includes FAI Cup)		League Cup (Note: Includes League of Ireland Cup)		Europe		Other		Total	
Club	Season	Division	Apps	Goals	Apps	Goals	Apps	Goals	Apps	Goals	Apps	Goals	Apps	Goals
Salthill Devon	2010	LOI First Division	7	0	0	0	0	0	—		2 (Note: Appearance in the 2010 League of Ireland First Division Promotion/Relegation Playoffs)	0	9	0
Salthill Devon	2011	LOI First Division	19	0	0	0	0	0	—		—		19	0
Salthill Devon	2012	LOI First Division	10	0	1	0	1	0	—		—		12	0
Salthill Devon	2013	LOI First Division	25	0	1	0	1	0	—		—		27	0
Salthill Devon	Total		61	0	2	0	2	0	—		2	0	67	0
Galway United	2014	LOI First Division	28	1	2	0	3	0	—		4 (Note: Appearances in the 2014 League of Ireland Promotion/Relegation Playoffs)	0	37	1
Galway United	2015	LOI Premier Division	31	0	2	0	5	0	—		—		38	0
Galway United	2016	LOI Premier Division	31	1	1	0	0	0	—		—		32	1
Galway United	2017	LOI Premier Division	32	0	3	0	3	0	—		—		38	0
Galway United	Total		122	2	8	0	11	0	—		4	0	145	2
Cork City	2018	LOI Premier Division	19	1	0	0	0	0	0 (Note: Appearance(s) in the UEFA Champions League & UEFA Europa League)	0	2 (Note: 1 appearance in the President of Ireland's Cup; 1 appearance in the Munster Senior Cup)	0	21	1
Cork City	2019	LOI Premier Division	20	0	2	0	1	0	2 (Note: Appearance(s) in the UEFA Europa League)	0	3 (Note: Appearance(s) in the Munster Senior Cup)	0	28	0
Cork City	Total		39	1	2	0	1	0	2	0	5	0	49	1
Derry City	2020	LOI Premier Division	11	0	2	0	–		1	0	–		14	0
Sligo Rovers	2021	LOI Premier Division	27	0	0	0	–		2 (Note: Apprearance(s) in the UEFA Europa Conference League)	0	–		29	0
Sligo Rovers	2022	LOI Premier Division	21	1	0	0	–		2	0	–		23	1
Sligo Rovers	Total		48	1	0	0	–		4	0	–		52	1
Galway United	2023	LOI First Division	20	1	0	0	—		—		—		20	1
Galway United	2024	LOI Premier Division	14	0	1	0	—		—		—		15	0
Galway United	2025	LOI Premier Division	10	0	1	0	—		—		—		11	0
Galway United	Total		44	1	2	0	—		—		—		47	1
Career Total			325	5	16	0	14	0	7	0	11	0	374	5

== Honours ==
=== Club ===
Cork City

- President of Ireland's Cup (1): 2018
- Munster Senior Cup (2): 2017–18, 2018–19

Galway United

- League of Ireland First Division (1): 2023

=== Individual ===
- PFAI First Division Team of the Year (1): 2014
