= Conor Barry =

Irish footballer & coach (born 1995)

Personal information
- Date of birth: 2 September 1995 (age 31)
- Place of birth: Portumna, County Galway
- Height: 1.73 m (5 ft 8 in)
- Position: Midfielder

Team information
- Current team: Athlone Town (assistant manager)

Youth career
- Salthill Devon

Senior career*
Years	Team	Apps	(Gls)
2013–2014	Salthill Devon	4	(0)
2014–2015	Galway United	5	(0)
2016–2017	Athlone Town	38	(9)
2017–2020	Galway United	60	(16)
2021	Finn Harps	8	(0)
2021	→ Athlone Town (loan)	3	(0)
2022	Wexford	27	(5)
2023	Treaty United	33	(2)

Managerial career
- 2025–: Athlone Town (assistant)
- 2026: Athlone Town (interim)
- * Club domestic league appearances and goals

Conor Barry (born 2 September 1995) is an Irish former professional footballer and current assistant manager of League of Ireland First Division club Athlone Town.

During his playing career Barry played in the League of Ireland for Salthill Devon, Galway United, Athlone Town, Finn Harps, Wexford and Treaty United.

== Playing career ==
=== Salthill Devon ===
On 2 August 2013, Barry made his debut for Salthill Devon in the League of Ireland First Division against Waterford United.

=== Galway United ===
In July 2014, Barry signed for First Division side Galway FC. At the end of the season Galway were promoted to the Premier Division via the play-offs.

In their first season back in the Premier Division, Galway United made it the League of Ireland Cup final where they lost on penalties to St Patrick's Athletic.

=== Athlone Town ===
In February 2016, Barry signed for League of Ireland First Division club Athlone Town. On 18 March 2016, Barry made his debut for the club where he scored and got an assist in a 2–2 draw against Drogheda United. He would score again in his second game with the club in a 3–3 draw against Waterford United. On 26 August, Barry scored 2 in a 4–0 win over Cabinteely.

=== Galway United ===
Barry re-joined his hometown club Galway United near the end of the 2017 season, which saw Galway be relegated to the First Division.

In his first full season back with the club Barry scored 10 goals finishing the season as the club's top scorer and being named the club's Player of the Year after hime winning the club's Player of the Month award three times in one season.

In the 2019 season Barry scored 8 goals in all competitions, once again finishing as the club's top goalscorer.

In the 2020 season, Galway United made it to the play-offs on the final day of the season, where they defeated Bray Wanderers in the semi-final, before losing to Longford Town in the final.

=== Finn Harps ===
On 5 January 2021, Barry signed for League of Ireland Premier Division club Finn Harps.

==== Athlone Town (loan) ====
On 27 July 2021, Barry re-joined Athlone Town on loan for the second half of the 2021 season.

=== Wexford ===
On 27 December 2021, Barry signed for League of Ireland First Division side Wexford. On 24 June 2022, Barry scored a 92nd-minute winner against Longford Town at Ferrycarrig Park.

=== Treaty United ===
Barry signed for First Division club Treaty United for the 2023 season alongside former teammate Ryan Connolly. On 30 September 2023, Barry scored his only 2 goals for the club in a 3–2 win over Longford town.

== Managerial career ==
On 8 August 2025, Barry joined League of Ireland First Division club Athlone Town as a first-team coach, under manager Ian Ryan.

On 6 July 2026, club manager Ian Ryan departed Athlone Town, with Conor Barry taking over the role of manager on an interim basis. On 10 July, in his only game in charge Barry managed secure Athlone's first win in 10 games with a 2–0 victory over Cobh Ramblers. Following this on 14 July, Seán O'Connor was appointed as the permanent manager of the club, with Barry returning to his place as assistant manager.

== Career statistics ==
=== Club ===
Appearances and goals by club, season and competition
Club	Season	League			National cup (Note: Includes FAI Cup)		League cup (Note: Includes League of Ireland Cup)		Other		Total	
Club	Season	Division	Apps	Goals	Apps	Goals	Apps	Goals	Apps	Goals	Apps	Goals
Salthill Devon	2013	LOI First Division	4	0	0	0	0	0	—		4	0
Galway United	2014	LOI First Division	2	0	0	0	0	0	0	0	2	0
Galway United	2015	LOI Premier Division	3	0	0	0	1	0	—		4	0
Galway United	Total		5	0	0	0	1	0	0	0	6	0
Athlone Town	2016	LOI First Division	22	6	2	0	1	0	0	0	25	6
Athlone Town	2017	LOI First Division	16	3	0	0	1	1	—		17	4
Athlone Town	Total		38	9	2	0	2	1	0	0	42	10
Galway United	2017	LOI Premier Division	0	0	0	0	0	0	—		0	0
Galway United	2018	LOI First Division	26	10	2	1	1	0	—		29	11
Galway United	2019	LOI First Division	19	5	3	2	1	1	—		23	8
Galway United	2020	LOI First Division	15	1	1	0	0	0	1 (Note: Apperence in the 2020 Promotion/relegation Play-offs)	0	17	1
Galway United	Total		60	16	6	3	2	1	1	0	69	20
Finn Harps	2021	LOI Premier Division	8	0	0	0	—		—		8	0
Athlone Town (loan)	2021	LOI First Division	3	0	0	0	—		—		3	0
Wexford	2022	LOI First Division	27	5	1	0	—		—		28	5
Treaty United	2023	LOI First Division	33	2	0	0	—		1 (Note: Apperence in the Munster Senior Cup)	0	34	2
Career total			131	10	9	0	7	0	5	0	158	11

== Managerial statistics ==
As of match played 10 July 2026

Managerial record by team and tenure
Team	From	To	Record							
Team	From	To	G	W	D	L	GF	GA	GD	Win %
Athlone Town (interim manager)	6 July 2026	14 July 2026	1	1	0	0	2	0	+2	100.00
Total			1	1	0	0	2	0	+2	100.00
