= 2026 Mervue United A.F.C. season =

Irish football club season

Mervue United
2026 season
- Kick-off between Mervue United and Home Farm at Fahy's Field
- Manager: Brendan O'Connor
- Stadium: Fahy's Field
- National League: Group 1: 3rd
- Top goalscorer: Gavin Smyth (4)
- Biggest win: 6–1 v Bonagee United; 3 October 2026 (Away)
- Biggest defeat: 1–6 v Home Farm; 12 September 2026 (Home)
Home colours

The 2026 Mervue United A.F.C. season was the football club's first season back in the League of Ireland following the creation of the FAI National League. The club's last appearance in the League of Ireland before that came in the 2013 League of Ireland First Division.

The club was participating in the first ever addition in the FAI National League the new third tier of the League of Ireland. The club had spent the last 13 years with their senior men's team playing in the Galway & District League, after having pulled out of the League of Ireland First Division alongside Salthill Devon in order to make way for the at the time newly reformed Galway United.

The 2026 season was a truncated season of the National League in order to line up with the League of Ireland calendar for the 2027 season.

The club finished the season in 3rd, missing out on the play-offs on goal difference.

== Squad ==
#	Name	Nationality	Position	Date of birth (age)	Previous Club	Signed	Notes
Goalkeepers
1	Peter Healy	(Republic of Ireland)	GK	July 12, 1996 (aged 30)	(Republic of Ireland) Regional United	2023	
20	Cian Costello	(Republic of Ireland)	GK	November 13, 2000 (aged 25)	(Republic of Ireland) Renmore	2026	
Defenders
2	Luke O'Gorman	(Republic of Ireland)	DF		(Republic of Ireland) Galway United	2023	
3	Milo O'Malley	(Republic of Ireland)	DF	September 30, 2005 (aged 21)	(Republic of Ireland) Galway United	2024	
4	Liam Murray	(Republic of Ireland)	DF	February 27, 2005 (aged 21)	(Republic of Ireland) Galway United	2025	Captain
5	Ify Asogu	(Republic of Ireland)	DF	January 17, 2004 (aged 22)	(Republic of Ireland) Maree Oranmore	2026	
12	Daniel Brennan	(Republic of Ireland)	DF	January 11, 2000 (aged 26)	(Republic of Ireland) Academy	2017	
15	Michael McSweeney	(Republic of Ireland)	DF	December 27, 2003 (aged 22)	(Republic of Ireland) Treaty United	2026	
17	Adam Healy	(Republic of Ireland)	DF	September 6, 1999 (aged 27)	(Republic of Ireland) Academy	2017	
21	Kacper Zatonski	(Republic of Ireland)	DF	July 22, 2002 (aged 24)	(Republic of Ireland) Maree Oranmore	2024	
Midfielders
6	Eoghan McDonagh	(Republic of Ireland)	MF	December 20, 2000 (aged 25)	(Republic of Ireland) Maree Oranmore	2026	
7	Kody McCann	(Republic of Ireland)	MF	November 28, 2002 (aged 23)	(Republic of Ireland) Athenry	2024	
8	Donnacha McNamara	(Republic of Ireland)	MF	September 20, 2004 (aged 22)	(Republic of Ireland) Maree Oranmore	2026	
10	Aaron Neary	(Republic of Ireland)	MF	May 12, 2003 (aged 23)	(Republic of Ireland) Galway United	2024	
11	Jason Molloy	(Republic of Ireland)	MF	September 22, 1988 (aged 38)	(Republic of Ireland) Athlone Town	2017	
13	Brian Tolan	(Republic of Ireland)	MF	November 1, 2005 (aged 21)	(Republic of Ireland) Salthill Devon	2026	
14	Jack Naylor	(Republic of Ireland)	MF	January 13, 2006 (aged 20)	(Republic of Ireland) Mayo FC	2026	
19	Charlie Jones-Concannon	(Republic of Ireland)	MF	May 6, 2002 (aged 24)	(Republic of Ireland) Galway United	2022	
Forwards
9	Gavin Smyth	(Republic of Ireland)	FW	November 23, 2004 (aged 21)	(Republic of Ireland) Maree Oranmore	2026	
16	Lewis Waweru	(Republic of Ireland)	FW	August 19, 2002 (aged 24)	(Republic of Ireland) Academy	2020	
18	Darragh McNamara	(Republic of Ireland)	FW		(Republic of Ireland) Corrib Celtic	2026	

== Club ==
=== Coaching staff ===
- Manager: Brendan O'Connor
- Assistant Manager: Ollie Neary
- Assistant Manager: Paul Sinnott
- Goalkeeping Coach: Tommy Lally

== Competitions ==
=== FAI National League ===
The first season of the National League was a truncated season which was intended to align the new clubs with the League of Ireland's summer calendar for the 2027 season. The first season consisted of 5 groups of 3, with Mervue United competing in Group 1. The winner of each group along with the best performing second place team would go on to a semi-final and final to decide the first National League Champions. For the first season there was no promotion.

==== Group 1 ====
Pos	Team	Pld	W	D	L	GF	GA	GD	Pts	Qualification
1	Lucan United	8	5	2	1	19	6	+13	17	Advance to the Play-offs
2	Home Farm	8	4	3	1	20	9	+11	15	Advance to the Play-offs
3	Mervue United	8	4	3	1	17	14	+3	15	
4	Bonagee United	8	1	2	5	8	22	−14	5	
5	Cockhill Celtic	8	0	2	6	8	21	−13	2	

Source: FAI

==== Results summary ====
Overall								Home						Away					
Pld	W	D	L	GF	GA	GD	Pts	W	D	L	GF	GA	GD	W	D	L	GF	GA	GD
8	4	3	1	17	14	+3	15	1	2	1	4	8	−4	3	1	0	13	6	+7

Last updated: complete.

==== Results by round ====
Round	1	2	3	4	5	6	7	8
Ground	H	A	H	H	H	A	A	A
Result	D	W	L	W	D	W	D	W
Position	4	2	2	2	2	2	2	3

Source: 2026 FAI National League
A = Away; H = Home; W = Win; D = Draw; L = Loss

==== Matches ====
Win Draw Loss

29 August 2026 1	Mervue United	1–1	Cockhill Celtic	Mervue, County Galway
15:00 GMT	Eoghan McDonagh (yellow card) 27'; Liam Murray (yellow card) 68'; Milo O'Malley (yellow card) 70'; Adam Healy (yellow card) 89'; Gavin Smyth 90+4' (pen.)	Report	Tiernan Ruddy 47' (yellow card) 56'; Odhran O'Brien-Daly (yellow card) 84'; Lee McLaughlin (yellow card) 90+3'; Shane O'Gara (yellow card) 90+3'; Adam Duffy (yellow card) 90+3'	Stadium: Fahy's Field; Referee: Brian Higgins

5 September 2026 2	Lucan United	1–2	Mervue United	Lucan, Dublin
15:00 GMT	Taylor Mooney 9'; Mark Byrne (yellow card) 38'	Report	Donnacha McNamara 28', 45+1'; Daniel Brennan (yellow card) 84'	Stadium: Westmanstown Road; Attendance: 314; Referee: Eric McCann

12 September 2026 3	Mervue United	1–6	Home Farm	Mervue, County Galway
15:00 GMT	Aaron Neary (yellow card) 14'; Kody McCann 34' (yellow card) 39'		Rob Manley 15', 73'; Sifax Mellah 18'; Aaron Walsh 28'; Owen Benson 36'	Stadium: Fahy's Field; Referee: Mark Kennedy
Note: This date was supposed to see Mervue play away against Home Farm, however the game was switched with their other fixture later in the season due to road closures at Whitehall Stadium.

19 September 2026 4	Mervue United	2–1	Bonagee United	Mervue, County Galway
15:00 GMT	Aaron Neary 6'; Donnacha McNamara 21'; Adam Healy (yellow card) 45+1'	Report	Gary Merritt 42'; Micheal Doherty (yellow card) 58'; Lee Toland (yellow card)	Stadium: Fahy's Field; Referee: Jay O'Loughlin-Ryan

26 September 2026 5	Mervue United	0–0	Lucan United	Mervue, County Galway
15:00 GMT			Dylan Hand (yellow card) 35'; Sean Quinn (yellow card) 62'; Adam Deans (yellow card) 90+1'	Stadium: Fahy's Field; Attendance: 150; Referee: Ray Conlon

3 October 2026 6	Bonagee United	1–6	Mervue United	Letterkenny, County Donegal
17:00 GMT	Micheal Doherty (yellow card) 52'; Shane Moran 57' (yellow card) 76'	Report	Kody McCann 23'; Gavin Smyth 39', 45+1'; Liam Murray (yellow card) 43'; Lewis Waweru 47', 55'; Aaron Neary (yellow card) 47'; Darragh McNamara 88'	Stadium: Dry Arch Park; Referee: Patrick Martin

17 October 2026 7	Home Farm	2–2	Mervue United	Whitehall, Dublin
14:00 GMT	Michael Keyes (yellow card) 14'; Sifaks Mellah (yellow card) 54'; Jared Penrose (yellow card) 80'; Alex Bailey 86'; Sam Hayden (yellow card) 87'; Callum Ralph (yellow card) 89'; Patrick Abako 90+4'	Report	Gavin Smyth 26' (pen.); Eoghan McDonagh (yellow card) 28'; Aaron Neary (yellow card) 36'; Luke O'Gorman (yellow card) 66'; Kody McCann 72'; Milo O'Malley (yellow card) 90'	Stadium: Whitehall Stadium; Attendance: 347; Referee: Ray Jason
Note: This date was supposed to see Mervue play at home against Home Farm, however the game was switched with their other fixture earlier in the season due to road closures at Whitehall Stadium.

7 November 2026 8	Cockhill Celtic	2–3	Mervue United	Buncrana, County Donegal
14:00 GMT	Peter Lewis (yellow card) 11' (goal) 90+1'; Lee McColgan 15' (pen.) (yellow card) 72'; Jack Mullan (yellow card) 33'; Tiernan Ruddy (yellow card) 51'; Harry Doherty (yellow card) 75'; Luke Rudden (yellow card) 79'; Danny McDaid (yellow card) 81'; Adam Duffy (yellow card) 90+4'	Report	Lewis Waweru 10'; Daniel Brennan (yellow card) 30'; Liam Murray (yellow card) 39'; Jack Naylor 76'; Charlie Jones-Concannon 90+7'	Stadium: Charlie O'Donnell Sports Grounds; Referee: Terence Moyne
Note: Game was originally scheduled for 24 October at 17:00 GMT, game was postponed due to a storm

=== Friendlies ===
Win Draw Loss

==== Pre-season Friendlies ====
15 August 2026	Mervue United	1–1	Mayo FC	Mervue, County Galway
15:00 GMT	Gavin Smyth 13'		Connor McCathy 22'	Stadium: Fahy's Field

22 August 2026	Salthill Devon	2–2	Mervue United	Drom, County Galway
				Stadium: Drom Soccer Park

== Statistics ==
=== Appearances and goals ===
This table shows all of the players who have featured in a first team squad for Mervue United this season
Brackets denotes appearances made as a substitute

No.	Pos.	Player	League		Total	
No.	Pos.	Player	Apps	Goals	Apps	Goals
1	GK	(Republic of Ireland) Peter Healy	5	0	5	0
2	DF	(Republic of Ireland) Luke O'Gorman	5(1)	0	5	0
3	DF	(Republic of Ireland) Milo O'Malley	8	0	8	0
4	DF	(Republic of Ireland) Liam Murray	7	0	7	0
5	DF	(Republic of Ireland) Ify Asogu	8	0	8	0
6	MF	(Republic of Ireland) Eoghan McDonagh	8(2)	0	8	0
7	MF	(Republic of Ireland) Kody McCann	7(1)	3	6	3
8	MF	(Republic of Ireland) Donnacha McNamara	6(2)	3	6	3
9	FW	(Republic of Ireland) Gavin Smyth	7(1)	4	7	4
10	MF	(Republic of Ireland) Aaron Neary	8	1	8	1
11	MF	(Republic of Ireland) Jason Molloy	5(5)	0	5	0
12	DF	(Republic of Ireland) Daniel Brennan	8	0	8	0
13	MF	(Republic of Ireland) Brian Tolan	5(4)	0	5	0
14	MF	(Republic of Ireland) Jack Naylor	6(3)	1	6	1
15	DF	(Republic of Ireland) Michael McSweeney	1(1)	0	1	0
16	FW	(Republic of Ireland) Lewis Waweru	8(3)	3	8	3
17	DF	(Republic of Ireland) Adam Healy	7(2)	0	7	0
18	FW	(Republic of Ireland) Darragh McNamara	5(5)	1	5	1
19	MF	(Republic of Ireland) Charlie Jones-Concannon	6(4)	1	6	1
20	GK	(Republic of Ireland) Cian Costello	3	0	3	0
21	DF	(Republic of Ireland) Kacper Zatonski	2(2)	0	2	0

=== Clean sheets ===
No.	Player	Total		
No.	Player	1	(Republic of Ireland) Peter Healy	0
20	(Republic of Ireland) Cian Costello	1		

=== Disciplinary record ===
No.	Player	Total		
No.	Player	Yellow card	(yellow card) (yellow-red card)	Red card
4	Liam Murray	3	0	0
10	Aaron Neary	3	0	0
3	Milo O'Malley	2	0	0
8	Eoghan McDonagh	2	0	0
12	Daniel Brennan	2	0	0
17	Adam Healy	2	0	0
2	Luke O'Gorman	1	0	0
7	Kody McCann	1	0	0
Totals		16	0	0
