= 2026 Salthill Devon F.C. season =

Irish football club season

Salthill Devon
2026 season
- Salthill in action against St Francis at Drom Soccer Park in the last league game of the season
- Manager: Greg Cunningham
- Stadium: Drom Soccer Park
- National League: Group 2: 1st
- NL Play-Offs: Semi-finals
- FAI Cup: First Round
- Top goalscorer: Ben McDonnell (4)
- Biggest win: 4–1 v Letterkenny Rovers; 29 August 2026 (Home)
- Biggest defeat: 1–4 v St Francis; 26 September 2026 (Away)
Home colours	Away colours

The 2026 Salthill Devon F.C. season was the football club's first season back in the League of Ireland following the creation of the FAI National League. The club's last appearance in the League of Ireland came in the 2013 League of Ireland First Division.

The club was participating in the first ever addition in the FAI National League the new third tier of the League of Ireland. The club had spent the last 13 years with their senior men's team playing in the Galway & District League, after having pulled out of the League of Ireland First Division alongside Mervue United in order to make way for the at the time newly reformed Galway United.

The 2026 season was a truncated season of the National League in order to line up with the League of Ireland calendar for the 2027 season.

The club won their group thanks to a 94th minute winner from Princewill Diala against St Francis on the final day, qualifying for the play-offs. In the play-offs they would lose in the semi-finals to Home Farm at Drom Soccer Park.

== Squad ==
#	Name	Nationality	Position	Date of birth (age)	Previous Club	Signed	Notes
Goalkeepers
1	Ethan Fahy	(Republic of Ireland)	GK	August 22, 2001 (aged 25)	(Republic of Ireland) Athenry	2026	
13	David Gavriliak	(Lithuania)	GK	September 17, 2002 (aged 24)	(Spain) Select Generation	2026	
23	Sam Begley	(Republic of Ireland)	GK	February 3, 2009 (aged 17)	(Republic of Ireland) Galway United	2026	
Defenders
2	Al-Amin Obasa	(Republic of Ireland)	DF	September 5, 1999 (aged 27)	(Republic of Ireland) Summerville Rovers	2026	
3	Churchill Idemudia	(Republic of Ireland)	DF	January 27, 2004 (aged 22)	(Republic of Ireland) Galway United	2025	
4	Calym Crowe	(Republic of Ireland)	DF	September 14, 2000 (aged 26)	(Republic of Ireland) Galway United	2020	Captain
5	Shane O'Rourke	(Republic of Ireland)	DF	January 17, 2004 (aged 22)	(Republic of Ireland) Academy	2013	
12	Ruari Hatch	(United States)	DF	February 9, 2005 (aged 21)	(Germany) SV Eichede	2026	
21	Richard Lapointe-Guevara	(Canada)	DF	March 11, 2002 (aged 24)	(Republic of Ireland) Treaty United	2026	
24	Jamal Sow	(Republic of Ireland)	DF	December 7, 2009 (aged 16)	(Republic of Ireland) Mayo FC	2026	
Midfielders
6	Nnabuike Nneji	(Nigeria)	MF	October 29, 1999 (aged 27)	(Republic of Ireland) Avenue United	2026	
8	Timmy Molloy	(Republic of Ireland)	MF	April 7, 1994 (aged 32)	(Republic of Ireland) Galway United	2021	
10	Josh Keane-Quinlivan	(Republic of Ireland)	MF	May 18, 2000 (aged 26)	(Republic of Ireland) Broadford United	2026	
11	Princewill Diala	(Republic of Ireland)	MF	November 11, 2001 (aged 25)	(Republic of Ireland) Maree Oranmore	2022	
14	Dermot MacGiollarnath	(Republic of Ireland)	MF	March 13, 2007 (aged 19)	(Republic of Ireland) Academy	2026	
15	Osakpolor Omorodion	(Republic of Ireland)	MF	November 23, 1999 (aged 26)	(Republic of Ireland) Aisling Annacotty	2026	
17	Callum Loomes	(Republic of Ireland)	MF	November 22, 2003 (aged 22)	(United States) UNOH Racers	2026	
18	Jacob Carroll	(Republic of Ireland)	MF	November 22, 2003 (aged 22)	(Republic of Ireland) Galway United	2026	
20	Kyle Cooney-Murray	(Republic of Ireland)	MF	October 2, 2007 (aged 19)	(Republic of Ireland) Tullamore Town	2026	
Forwards
7	Ben McDonnell	(Republic of Ireland)	FW	February 16, 2006 (aged 20)	(Republic of Ireland) Galway United	2026	
9	Cole Connolly	(Republic of Ireland)	FW	September 5, 1998 (aged 28)	(Republic of Ireland) Athenry	2025	
16	Darren Darcy	(Republic of Ireland)	FW	February 1, 2005 (aged 21)	(Republic of Ireland) Glaway United	2025	
22	Ronan Kerin	(Republic of Ireland)	FW	August 22, 1997 (aged 29)	(Republic of Ireland) Avenue United	2026	

== Club ==
=== Coaching staff ===
- Manager: Greg Cunningham
- Coach: Padraig Fadden
- Coach: Tommy McClean

== Competitions ==
=== FAI National League ===
The first season of the National League was a truncated season which is intended to align the new clubs with the League of Ireland's summer calendar for the 2027 season. The first season consisted of 5 groups of 3, with Salthill Devon competing in Group 2, the winner of each group along with the best performing second place team went on to a semi-final and final to decide the first National League Champions. For the first season there was no promotion.

==== Group 2 ====
Pos	Team	Pld	W	D	L	GF	GA	GD	Pts	Qualification
1	Salthill Devon	8	5	2	1	17	11	+6	17	Advance to the Play-offs
2	St Francis	8	4	2	2	16	7	+9	14	
3	Mayo FC	8	3	0	5	9	15	−6	9	
4	Letterkenny Rovers	8	2	2	4	15	18	−3	8	
5	TU Dublin	8	1	4	3	12	18	−6	7	

Source: FAI

==== Results summary ====
Overall								Home						Away					
Pld	W	D	L	GF	GA	GD	Pts	W	D	L	GF	GA	GD	W	D	L	GF	GA	GD
8	5	2	1	17	11	+6	17	3	1	0	10	4	+6	2	1	1	7	7	0

Last updated: complete.

==== Results by round ====
Round	1	2	3	4	5	6	7	8
Ground	H	H	H	A	A	A	A	H
Result	W	D	W	L	D	W	W	W
Position	1	1	1	2	1	2	2	1

Source: 2026 FAI National League
A = Away; H = Home; W = Win; D = Draw; L = Loss

==== Matches ====
Win Draw Loss

29 August 2026 1	Salthill Devon	4–1	Letterkenny Rovers	Drom, County Galway
15:00 GMT	Timmy Molloy 21' (pen.); Jacob Carroll (yellow card) 60'; Shane O'Rourke (yellow card) 66'; Cole Connolly 70' (yellow card) 84'; Ben McDonnell 90+4'; Josh Keane-Quinlivan 90+6'	Report	Adam McCaffrey 9'; Keith Cowan (yellow card) 40'; Padraic Gilsenan (yellow card) 45+2'; Adrian Delap (yellow card) 55'; Dean McCarry (yellow card) 77'; Zach Gorman (penalty missed) 81'	Stadium: Drom Soccer Park; Referee: Roy Conlon

6 September 2026 2	Salthill Devon	2–2	TU Dublin	Drom, County Galway
14:00 GMT	Ben McDonnell 7', 78'; Jamal Sow (yellow card) 21'; Al-Amin Obasa (yellow card) 33'; Jacob Carroll (yellow card) 38'; Cole Connolly (yellow card) 43'	Report	Aaron Corish (yellow card) 33'; Emmanuel Milongo 69', 80'; Jack Kavanagh (yellow card) 85'	Stadium: Drom Soccer Park; Attendance: 148; Referee: Jay O’Loughlinn-Ryan
Note: Game was originally schedueled for 5 September as an away game for Salthill Devon. However the fixture was switched with the reverse fixture later in the season.

19 September 2026 3	Salthill Devon	2–0	Mayo FC	Drom, County Galway
15:00 GMT	Churchill Idemudia (yellow card) 11'; Timmy Molloy 38' (pen.); Richard Lapointe-Guevara (yellow card); Cole Connolly 84'	Report	James McGrath (yellow card) 38'; Oisín O'Reilly (yellow card) 70'	Stadium: Drom Soccer Park; Referee: Ray Conlon

26 September 2026 4	St Francis	4–1	Salthill Devon	Baldonnel, County Dublin
15:00 GMT	Daniel Hickey 13', 32'; Conor Behan 46'; Jamie Gray 54'; Luke Scanlon (yellow card) 71'; Babatunde Animashaun (yellow card) 82'; Lasha Baramidze (yellow card) 83'; Sean McManus (yellow card)	Report	Richard Lapointe-Guevara (yellow card) 52'; Josh Keane-Quinlivan 84'; Shane O'Rourke (yellow card) 90'	Stadium: John Hyland Park; Attendance: 308; Referee: Patrick White

3 October 2026 5	TU Dublin	1–1	Salthill Devon	Grangegorman, Dublin 7
17:00 GMT	Kian Reddy 3'; Ryan Graham (yellow card); Leo Crabb (yellow card); Tjay Olusanya (yellow card)	Report	Timmy Molloy 56'; Shane O'Rourke (yellow card) 90+3' (yellow-red card); Jacob Carroll (yellow card); Cole Connolly (red card)	Stadium: TU Dublin Ground; Referee: Paul Kirwan
Note: Game was originally schedueled as home game for Salthill Devon. However the fixture was switched with the reverse fixture earlier in the season.

17 October 2026 6	Mayo FC	1–2	Salthill Devon	Castlebar, County Mayo
14:00 GMT	Oisín O'Reilly (red card) 55'; James McGrath (yellow card) 61'; Alfonso Barrios (yellow card) 76' (yellow-red card) 85'; Sean McAteer 78' (pen.)	Report	Ronan Kerin 6', 63'; Princewill Diala (yellow card) 52'; Nnabuike Nneji (yellow card) 61'; Churchill Idemudia (yellow card) 76'	Stadium: Umbro Park; Referee: Brian Higgins

31 October 2026 7	Letterkenny Rovers	1–3	Salthill Devon	Letterkenny, County Donegal
16:00 GMT	Brendan McCafferty (yellow card) 31'; Keith Cowan (yellow card) 31'; Shane McNamee 40'	Report	Jacob Carroll (yellow card) 2'; Ben McDonnell 9'; Princewill Diala 17', 57'; Churchill Idemudia (yellow card) 24'; Richard Lapointe-Guevara (yellow card) 64'	Stadium: Leckview Park; Attendance: 130; Referee: Vincent McLoughlin

7 November 2026 8	Salthill Devon	2–1	St Francis	Drom, County Galway
15:00 GMT	Ronan Kerin 10' (yellow card) 38'; Calym Crowe (yellow card) 79'; Churchill Idemudia (yellow card) 79'; Nnabuike Nneji (yellow card) 86'; Princewill Diala 90+4' (pen.); Al-Amin Obasa (red card)	Report	Daragh Ellison (yellow card) 17'; Dylan Stack 30' (penalty missed) 80’ Zach Donohue (yellow card) 75'; Rory Garvey (yellow card) 80'; Seamus Curley (yellow card) 90+3'; Colin McCabe (yellow card) 90+3'	Stadium: Drom Soccer Park; Referee: Stephen Rooney
Note: Game was originally scheduled for 24 October, game was postponed due to a storm

==== Play-offs ====
21 November 2026 Semi-final	Salthill Devon	1–2	Home Farm	Drom, County Galway
15:00 GMT	Ronan Kerin (yellow card) 20'; Churchill Idemudia (yellow card) 38' (yellow-red card) 45+1'; Richard Lapointe-Guevara 46'; Calym Crowe (yellow card) 67'; Darren Darcy (yellow card) 75'	Report	Evan Haddock (yellow card) 10'; Aaron Walsh (yellow card) 13'; Shane Forbes 33'; Harry O'Connor 51'	Stadium: Drom Soccer Park; Referee: Brian Higgins

=== FAI Cup ===
Win Draw Loss

23 May 2026 First Round	Crumlin United	4–0	Salthill Devon	Crumlin, Dublin 12
17:00 GMT	Cian Kenna 6', 55'; Jude Healy 67'; Greg Moorhouse 90+2'	Report	Darren Collins (yellow card) 38'; Paul Scally (yellow card) 55'	Stadium: Pearse Park; Attendance: 42; Referee: Declan Troy

=== Friendlies ===
Win Draw Loss

==== Pre-season Friendlies ====
22 August 2026	Salthill Devon	2–2	Mervue United	Drom, County Galway
				Stadium: Drom Soccer Park

== Statistics ==
=== Appearances and goals ===
This table shows all of the players who have featured in a first team squad for Salthill Devon this season
Brackets denotes appearances made as a substitute

No.	Pos.	Player	League		Play-offs		Total	
No.	Pos.	Player	Apps	Goals	Apps	Goals	Apps	Goals
1	GK	(Republic of Ireland) Ethan Fahy	0	0	0	0	0	0
2	DF	(Republic of Ireland) Al-Amin Obasa	8	0	0	0	8	0
3	DF	(Republic of Ireland) Churchill Idemudia	7(1)	0	1	0	8	0
4	DF	(Republic of Ireland) Calym Crowe	8(1)	0	1	0	9	0
5	DF	(Republic of Ireland) Shane O'Rourke	7	0	1	0	8	0
6	MF	(Nigeria) Nnabuike Nneji	6(1)	0	1	0	7	0
7	FW	(Republic of Ireland) Ben McDonnell	8(1)	4	1	0	9	4
8	MF	(Republic of Ireland) Timmy Molloy	8(1)	3	1	0	9	3
9	FW	(Republic of Ireland) Cole Connolly	5(1)	2	1(1)	0	6	2
10	MF	(Republic of Ireland) Josh Keane-Quinlivan	3(2)	2	0	0	3	2
11	MF	(Republic of Ireland) Princewill Diala	4(2)	3	1	0	5	3
12	DF	(United States) Ruari Hatch	1(1)	0	0	0	1	0
13	GK	(Lithuania) David Gavriliak	1	0	0	0	1	0
14	MF	(Republic of Ireland) Dermot MacGiollarnath	6(4)	0	1(1)	0	7	0
15	MF	(Republic of Ireland) Osakpolor Omorodion	4(2)	0	0	0	4	0
16	FW	(Republic of Ireland) Darren Darcy	7(6)	0	1(1)	0	8	0
17	MF	(Republic of Ireland) Callum Loomes	2(2)	0	0	0	2	0
18	MF	(Republic of Ireland) Jacob Carroll	8	0	1	0	9	0
20	MF	(Republic of Ireland) Kyle Cooney-Murray	1(1)	0	0	0	0	0
21	DF	(Canada) Richard Lapointe-Guevara	8(1)	0	1	1	9	1
22	FW	(Republic of Ireland) Ronan Kerin	6(2)	3	1	0	7	3
23	GK	(Republic of Ireland) Sam Begley	7	0	1	0	8	0
24	DF	(Republic of Ireland) Jamal Sow	4(2)	0	0	0	4	0

=== Clean sheets ===
No.	Player	Total		
No.	Player	1	(Republic of Ireland) Ethan Fahy	0
13	(Lithuania) David Gavriliak	0		
23	(Republic of Ireland) Sam Begley	1		

=== Disciplinary record ===
No.	Player	Leauge			Play-offs			Total		
No.	Player	Yellow card	(yellow card) (yellow-red card)	Red card	Yellow card	(yellow card) (yellow-red card)	Red card	Yellow card	(yellow card) (yellow-red card)	Red card
3	Churchill Idemudia	4	0	0	0	1	0	4	1	0
18	Jacob Carroll	4	0	0	0	0	0	4	0	0
5	Shane O'Rourke	2	1	0	0	0	0	2	1	0
9	Cole Connolly	2	0	1	0	0	0	2	0	1
21	Richard Lapointe-Guevara	3	0	0	0	0	0	3	0	0
2	Al-Amin Obasa	1	0	1	0	0	0	1	0	1
4	Calym Crowe	1	0	0	1	0	0	2	0	0
6	Nnabuike Nneji	2	0	0	0	0	0	2	0	0
22	Ronan Kerin	1	0	0	1	0	0	2	0	0
11	Princewill Diala	1	0	0	0	0	0	1	0	0
16	Darren Darcy	0	0	0	1	0	0	1	0	0
24	Jamal Sow	1	0	0	0	0	0	1	0	0
Totals		22	1	2	3	1	0	25	2	2
