= 2026 FAI National League play-offs =

FAI National League play-offs
- Salthill Devon and Home Farm line up before their semi-final game at Drom Soccer Park
- Season: 2026
- Semi-finals (Eliminated): Salthill Devon, Villa
- Final: Home Farm, Lucan United

The FAI National League play-offs for the 2026 season are being held in November 2026 with the final set for 28 November in Dublin.

The play-offs began with two one-legged semi-finals, before a final to decide the first ever FAI National League champions. As the first season of the National League was a truncated season, promotion to the First Division is not on the line.

== Semi-finals ==
=== Background ===
The first season of the FAI National League saw 15 teams get split up into three groups of five. The three groups winners as well as the best second place team would then take part in the play-offs to be crowned the first ever FAI National League champions.

=== Salthill Devon vs Home Farm ===
==== Qualification ====
===== Group 2 =====
Pos	Team	Pld	W	D	L	GF	GA	GD	Pts	Qualification
1	Salthill Devon	8	5	2	1	17	11	+6	17	Advance to the Play-offs
2	St Francis	8	4	2	2	16	7	+9	14	
3	Mayo FC	8	3	0	5	9	15	−6	9	
4	Letterkenny Rovers	8	2	2	4	15	18	−3	8	
5	TU Dublin	8	1	4	3	12	18	−6	7	

Source: FAI

===== Group 1 =====
Pos	Team	Pld	W	D	L	GF	GA	GD	Pts	Qualification
1	Lucan United	8	5	2	1	19	6	+13	17	Advance to the Play-offs
2	Home Farm	8	4	3	1	20	9	+11	15	Advance to the Play-offs
3	Mervue United	8	4	3	1	17	14	+3	15	
4	Bonagee United	8	1	2	5	8	22	−14	5	
5	Cockhill Celtic	8	0	2	6	8	21	−13	2	

Source: FAI

Pos	Grp	Team	Pld	W	D	L	GF	GA	GD	Pts	Qualification
1	1	Home Farm	8	4	3	1	20	9	+11	15	Advance to Semi-final
2	2	St Francis	8	4	2	2	16	7	+9	14	
3	3	CK United	8	4	2	2	16	15	+1	14	

Source: FAI

==== Details ====
21 November 2026
15:00 IST

Salthill Devon	1−2	Home Farm
Idemudia (yellow card) 38' (yellow-red card) 45+1'; Lapointe-Guevara 46'		Forbes 33'; O'Connor 51'

Drom Soccer Park, County Galway
Referee: Brian Higgins

Salthill Devon	Home Farm

GK	23	(Republic of Ireland) Sam Begley
DF	3	(Republic of Ireland) Churchill Idemudia	(yellow card) 38'
DF	4	(Republic of Ireland) Calym Crowe (c)	(yellow card) 67'
DF	5	(Republic of Ireland) Shane O'Rourke
DF	18	(Republic of Ireland) Jacob Carroll
MF	6	(Nigeria) Nnabuike Nneji
MF	7	(Republic of Ireland) Ben McDonnell		(substituted off) 75'
MF	8	(Republic of Ireland) Timmy Molloy
MF	11	(Republic of Ireland) Princewill Diala		(substituted off) 45'
MF	21	(Canada) Richard Lapointe-Guevara		(substituted off) 70'
FW	22	(Republic of Ireland) Ronan Kerin	(yellow card) 20'
Substitutes:
GK	1	(Republic of Ireland) Ethan Fahy
DF	12	(United States) Ruari Hatch
DF	24	(Republic of Ireland) Jamal Sow
MF	14	(Republic of Ireland) Dermot MacGiollarnath		(substituted on) 45'
MF	15	(Republic of Ireland) Osakpolor Omorodion
MF	20	(Republic of Ireland) Kyle Cooney-Murray
FW	9	(Republic of Ireland) Cole Connolly		(substituted on) 70'
FW	16	(Republic of Ireland) Darren Darcy	(yellow card) 75'	(substituted on) 75'
Manager:
(Republic of Ireland) Greg Cunningham (yellow card) 61'

GK	1	(Republic of Ireland) Dáithí Folan
DF	2	(Republic of Ireland) Michael Keyes
DF	4	(Republic of Ireland) Aaron Walsh	(yellow card) 13'
DF	5	(Republic of Ireland) Evan Haddock	(yellow card) 6'
DF	23	(Republic of Ireland) Jared Penrose
MF	7	(Republic of Ireland) Alan Leonard		(substituted off) 81'
MF	10	(Republic of Ireland) Harry O'Connor		(substituted off) 76'
MF	16	(Republic of Ireland) Shane Forbes		(substituted off) 81'
MF	24	(Republic of Ireland) Sam Hayden
MF	25	(Republic of Ireland) Sifaks Mellah (c)	(yellow card) 64'
FW	22	(Republic of Ireland) Rob Manley		(substituted off) 66'
Substitutes:
GK	13	(Republic of Ireland) Alan Hussey
DF	3	(Republic of Ireland) Callum Ralph	(yellow card) 86'	(substituted on) 81'
DF	12	(Republic of Ireland) Ethan Maher
DF	15	(Republic of Ireland) Abdul-Muniz Dele
DF	17	(Republic of Ireland) Davin O'Connor		(substituted on) 76'
MF	6	(Ukraine) Viktor Serdenyuk		(substituted on) 81'
MF	9	(Republic of Ireland) Jamal Ibrahim
MF	11	(Republic of Ireland) Owen Benson
FW	21	(Republic of Ireland) Patrick Abako		(substituted on) 66'
Manager:
(Republic of Ireland) Gavin Peers (yellow card) 54'

=== Lucan United vs Villa ===
==== Qualification ====
===== Group 1 =====
Pos	Team	Pld	W	D	L	GF	GA	GD	Pts	Qualification
1	Lucan United	8	5	2	1	19	6	+13	17	Advance to the Play-offs
2	Home Farm	8	4	3	1	20	9	+11	15	Advance to the Play-offs
3	Mervue United	8	4	3	1	17	14	+3	15	
4	Bonagee United	8	1	2	5	8	22	−14	5	
5	Cockhill Celtic	8	0	2	6	8	21	−13	2	

Source: FAI

===== Group 3 =====
Pos	Team	Pld	W	D	L	GF	GA	GD	Pts	Qualification
1	Villa	8	7	1	0	33	8	+25	22	Advance to the Play-offs
2	CK United	8	4	2	2	16	15	+1	14	
3	UCC	8	4	1	3	15	16	−1	13	
4	Newbridge Town	8	1	2	5	7	20	−13	5	
5	Killarney Celtic	8	0	2	6	10	22	−12	2	

Source: FAI

==== Details ====
21 November 2026
15:00 IST

Lucan United	2−1	Villa
Mooney 37'; Ebbe 52' (pen.); Quinn (red card) 80'		Walsh 7' (pen.)

Westmanstown Road, Dublin
Attendance: 502
Referee: Ray Conlon

Lucan United	Villa

GK	1	(Republic of Ireland) Craig Hyland
DF	2	(Republic of Ireland) Adam Deans	(yellow card) 41'
DF	4	(Republic of Ireland) Dylan Hand
DF	5	(Republic of Ireland) Luke Walsh
DF	13	(Republic of Ireland) Martins Olakanye
MF	7	(Republic of Ireland) Taylor Mooney		(substituted off) 66'
MF	11	(Republic of Ireland) Destiny Avenbuan	(yellow card) 42'
MF	16	(Republic of Ireland) Conall Cronin
MF	19	(Republic of Ireland) Sean Quinn (c)
FW	9	(Republic of Ireland) Dean Ebbe		(substituted off) 77'
FW	23	(Romania) Marco Chindea		(substituted off) 70'
Substitutes:
GK	18	(Republic of Ireland) Edvin Jakas
DF	3	(Republic of Ireland) Caleb O'Neill
DF	14	(Republic of Ireland) Adam Nolan
MF	10	(Republic of Ireland) James Doona		(substituted on) 66'
MF	12	(Republic of Ireland) Agbo Babatunde
MF	17	(Republic of Ireland) Josh Stapleton
MF	21	(Republic of Ireland) Reece Weldon		(substituted on) 70'
FW	22	(Republic of Ireland) Adrian Mihutescu		(substituted on) 77'
Manager:
(Republic of Ireland) Darius Kierans

GK	1	(Republic of Ireland) Craig Dunphy
DF	3	(Republic of Ireland) John Tamen
DF	4	(Republic of Ireland) Adam Conway
DF	5	(Republic of Ireland) Anthony Ebhonuaye
DF	14	(Republic of Ireland) Cian Browne	(yellow card) 31'
MF	7	(Republic of Ireland) Conor Kilgannon
MF	8	(Republic of Ireland) Conor Whittle		(substituted off) 75'
MF	10	(Republic of Ireland) Aaron O'Connor
FW	9	(Republic of Ireland) Dean Walsh (c)	(yellow card) 40'
MF	20	(Republic of Ireland) Callum Flynn		(substituted off) 75'
FW	23	(Zimbabwe) Anderson Sipho Dube	(yellow card) 9'	(substituted off) 65'
Substitutes:
GK	18	(Republic of Ireland) Fabian Kerton
DF	2	(Republic of Ireland) James Kennedy		(substituted on) 75'
DF	12	(Republic of Ireland) Killian Griffin
DF	26	(United States) Dylan Stickel
MF	6	(Republic of Ireland) Luke Walsh		(substituted on) 65'
MF	11	(Republic of Ireland) Shane O'Sullivan	(substituted on) 75'	(substituted off) 75'
FW	16	(Republic of Ireland) Evan Ryan		(substituted on) 75'
FW	19	(Republic of Ireland) Ed O'Dwyer
FW	33	(Democratic Republic of the Congo) Regix Madika
Manager:
(Republic of Ireland) Conor Coad

== Final ==
=== Background ===
Pos	Team	Pld	W	D	L	GF	GA	GD	Pts	Qualification
1	Lucan United	8	5	2	1	19	6	+13	17	Advance to the Play-offs
2	Home Farm	8	4	3	1	20	9	+11	15	Advance to the Play-offs
3	Mervue United	8	4	3	1	17	14	+3	15	
4	Bonagee United	8	1	2	5	8	22	−14	5	
5	Cockhill Celtic	8	0	2	6	8	21	−13	2	

Source: FAI

Both finalists were in Group 1 at the start of the competition, because of this they have already played twice this season. In the first game where Lucan United were at home on 3 October, they game ended in a 2−2 draw. The second game the played on 31 October where Home Farm were at home, Lucan United won 2−0.

=== Details ===
28 November 2026

Home Farm	v	Lucan United

TBD, Dublin

== See also ==
- 2026 League of Ireland play-offs
