= 2026 FAI National League =

1st season of the FAI National League

FAI National League
- Season: 2026
- Dates: 29 August 2026 – 28 November 2026
- Country: Republic of Ireland
- Teams: 15
- Matches: 59
- Goals: 218 (3.69 per match)
- Top goalscorer: Calum Flynn (7)
- Biggest home win: Lucan United 6–0 Bonagee United (7 November 2026)
- Biggest away win: Mervue United 1–6 Home Farm (12 September 2026); Bonagee United 1–6 Mervue United (3 October 2026); UCC 0–5 Villa (10 October 2026)
- Highest scoring: Letterkenny Rovers 6–3 TU Dublin (26 September 2026)
- Longest winning run: Villa (4)
- Longest unbeaten run: Home Farm & Villa (7)
- Longest winless run: Newbridge Town (7)
- Longest losing run: Cockhill Celtic (5)
- Highest attendance: 1,216; CK United 3–3 Villa (19 September 2026)
- All statistics correct as of 24 October 2026.

The 2026 FAI National League is the first season of the FAI National League, largely operating as the third-tier Irish league for association football clubs. It is the first third tier season overseen by the Football Association of Ireland since the end of the A Championship in 2011.

== Format ==
The first season of the FAI National League is due to be a truncated season, running from August to November, to assist in getting the newly added clubs in sync with the broader League of Ireland (LOI) schedule, as typically their seasons wouldn’t use the same calendar as the LOI. This also means that there will be no promotion to the First Division available in the league's first season.

The 2026 format consists of 15 teams split up into 3 groups of 5. Each team plays the other teams in its group twice, home and away, for a total of 8 group games.

The 3 group winners as well as the best performing second-placed side are due to enter into a semi-final and then final at neutral venues, to crown the first ever FAI National League Champions.

It was originally planned for there to be 20 teams which would be split into North and South leagues with 10 teams each. This is still planned to go ahead from the 2027 season onwards.

== Teams ==
=== Group 1 ===
Locations of the 2026 FAI National League teams.
- Group 1 teams
- Group 2 teams
- Group 3 teams
Locations of the 2026 FAI National League teams in the Dublin region.
- Group 1 teams
- Group 2 teams

Team	Location	Stadium	Capacity
Bonagee United	Letterkenny	Dry Arch Park	
Cockhill Celtic	Buncrana	Charlie O'Donnell Sports Grounds	1,000
Home Farm	Whitehall, Dublin	Whitehall Stadium	1,800
Lucan United	Lucan	Westmanstown Road	
Mervue United	Galway	Fahy's Field	

=== Group 2 ===
Team	Location	Stadium	Capacity
Letterkenny Rovers	Letterkenny	Leckview Park	1,000
Mayo FC	Castlebar	Umbro Park	1,500
Salthill Devon	Knocknacarra	Drom Soccer Park	2,000
St Francis	Baldonnel	John Hyland Park	
TU Dublin	Blanchardstown	TU Dublin Blanchardstown	

=== Group 3 ===
Team	Location	Stadium	Capacity
CK United	Carlow	SETU Sports Campus	
Killarney Celtic	Killarney	Celtic Park	
Newbridge Town	Newbridge	Station Road	2,180
UCC	Cork	The Mardyke	800
Villa	Waterford	workLAB Connors Park	

=== Personnel and kits ===
Team	Manager	Captain	Kit manufacturer	Shirt sponsor
Bonagee United	(Republic of Ireland) Declan Lynch	(Republic of Ireland) Gareth Harkin	Joma	Lurgyback Open Farm
CK United	(Republic of Ireland) Tom O'Connor	(Republic of Ireland) Emmet Nugent	DSsports	Square Root Solutions
Cockhill Celtic	(Republic of Ireland) Gavin Cullen	(Republic of Ireland) Lee McColgan	O'Reillys	HML Plant Sales
Home Farm	(Republic of Ireland) Gavin Peers	(Republic of Ireland) Daithi Folan	Umbro	Intersport Elverys
Killarney Celtic	(Republic of Ireland) Tim Jones	(Republic of Ireland) Matt Keane	Joma	Seefin Aviatons
Letterkenny Rovers	(Republic of Ireland) Stephen McConnell	(Republic of Ireland) Gareth Doherty	Adidas	Donnelly & Foley
Lucan United	(Republic of Ireland) Darius Kierans	(Republic of Ireland) Sean Quinn	Uhlsport	DHL
Mayo FC	(Republic of Ireland) Anthony O'Neill	(Republic of Ireland) Noe Baba	Umbro	Intersport Elverys
Mervue United	(Republic of Ireland) Brendan O'Connor	(Republic of Ireland) Liam Murray	O'Neills	Seapoint Leisure
Newbridge Town	(Republic of Ireland) Martin Russell	(Republic of Ireland) Nathan McAuley	O'Neills	N/A
Salthill Devon	(Republic of Ireland) Greg Cunningham	(Republic of Ireland) Callum Crowe	Umbro	The Dough Bros
St Francis	(Republic of Ireland) Kevin Smith	(Republic of Ireland) Seamus Curley	Macron	PJ Duffy & Sons
TU Dublin	(Republic of Ireland) Jamie Moore	(Republic of Ireland) Matthew O'Brien	O'Neills	N/A
UCC	(Republic of Ireland) David Moore	(Republic of Ireland) Daniel McCarthy	Macron	Bank of Ireland
Villa	(Republic of Ireland) Conor Coad	(Republic of Ireland) Luke Walsh	Joma	workLAB

=== Managerial changes ===
Team	Outgoing manager	Manner of departure	Date of vacancy	Position in the table	Incoming manager	Date of appointment
CK United	(Republic of Ireland) Tom O'Connor	Sacked	3 November 2026	2nd		

== Standings ==
=== Group 1 ===
Pos	Team	Pld	W	D	L	GF	GA	GD	Pts	Qualification
1	Lucan United	8	5	2	1	19	6	+13	17	Advance to the Play-offs
2	Home Farm	8	4	3	1	20	9	+11	15	Advance to the Play-offs
3	Mervue United	8	4	3	1	17	14	+3	15	
4	Bonagee United	8	1	2	5	8	22	−14	5	
5	Cockhill Celtic	8	0	2	6	8	21	−13	2	

Source: FAI

==== Results ====
Teams play each other twice (once at home and once away).

Home \ Away	BON	COC	HMF	LUC	MRV
Bonagee United		3–2	2–2	0–1	1–6
Cockhill Celtic	1–1		0–2	2–5	2–3
Home Farm	2–0	4–0		0–2	2–2
Lucan United	6–0	2–0	2–2		1–2
Mervue United	2–1	1–1	1–6	0–0	

Source: FAI
Legend: Blue = home team win; Yellow = draw; Red = away team win.

=== Group 2 ===
Pos	Team	Pld	W	D	L	GF	GA	GD	Pts	Qualification
1	Salthill Devon	8	5	2	1	17	11	+6	17	Advance to the Play-offs
2	St Francis	8	4	2	2	16	7	+9	14	
3	Mayo FC	8	3	0	5	9	15	−6	9	
4	Letterkenny Rovers	8	2	2	4	15	18	−3	8	
5	TU Dublin	8	1	4	3	12	18	−6	7	

Source: FAI

==== Results ====
Teams play each other twice (once at home and once away).

Home \ Away	LKR	MYO	SDV	STF	TUD
Letterkenny Rovers		3–0	1–3	0–3	6–3
Mayo FC	2–1		1–2	1–0	2–3
Salthill Devon	4–1	2–0		2–1	2–2
St Francis	1–1	4–1	4–1		2–0
TU Dublin	2–2	0–2	1–1	1–1	

Source: FAI
Legend: Blue = home team win; Yellow = draw; Red = away team win.

=== Group 3 ===
Pos	Team	Pld	W	D	L	GF	GA	GD	Pts	Qualification
1	Villa	8	7	1	0	33	8	+25	22	Advance to the Play-offs
2	CK United	8	4	2	2	16	15	+1	14	
3	UCC	8	4	1	3	15	16	−1	13	
4	Newbridge Town	8	1	2	5	7	20	−13	5	
5	Killarney Celtic	8	0	2	6	10	22	−12	2	

Source: FAI

==== Results ====
Teams play each other twice (once at home and once away).

Home \ Away	CKU	KLC	NBT	UCC	VIL
CK United		3–1	2–1	2–3	3–3
Killarney Celtic	2–3		1–1	1–2	2–4
Newbridge Town	0–2	2–2		1–3	1–5
UCC	1–1	4–1	0–1		0–5
Villa	4–0	3–0	5–0	4–2	

Source: FAI
Legend: Blue = home team win; Yellow = draw; Red = away team win.

=== Ranking of 2nd placed teams ===
Pos	Grp	Team	Pld	W	D	L	GF	GA	GD	Pts	Qualification
1	1	Home Farm	8	4	3	1	20	9	+11	15	Advance to Semi-final
2	2	St Francis	8	4	2	2	16	7	+9	14	
3	3	CK United	8	4	2	2	16	15	+1	14	

Source: FAI

== Play-offs ==
=== Bracket ===
Semi-finals
1	Salthill Devon	1
2	Home Farm	2
3	Lucan United	2
4	Villa	1

Final
Home Farm
Lucan United

Semi-final 1

21 November 2026
15:00 GMT

Salthill Devon	1–2	Home Farm
Idemudia (red card) 45+1'; Lapointe-Guevara 46'		Forbes 33'; O'Connor 51'

Drom Soccer Park, Drom, County Galway
Referee: Brian Higgins

Semi-final 2

21 November 2026
15:00 GMT

Lucan United	2–1	Villa
Mooney 37'; Ebbe 52' (pen.); Quinn (red card) 80'		Walsh 7' (pen.)

Westmanstown Road, Lucan, Dublin
Attendance: 502
Referee: Ray Conlon

Final

28 November 2026

Home Farm	v	Lucan United

Neutral Venue TBD

== Season statistics ==
As of 24 October 2026

=== Top scorers ===
Rank	Player	Club	Goals
1	(Republic of Ireland) Calum Flynn	Villa	7
2	(Republic of Ireland) Conor Kilgannon	Villa	5
2	(Republic of Ireland) Dean Walsh	Villa	5
4	(Republic of Ireland) Zach Gorman	Letterkenny Rovers	4
4	(Republic of Ireland) Dean Ebbe	Lucan United	4
4	(Republic of Ireland) Daniel Hickey	St Francis	4
4	(Republic of Ireland) Patrick Abako	Home Farm	4
4	(Republic of Ireland) Gavin Smyth	Mervue United	4
4	(Republic of Ireland) Dean Deniefee-Kelly	CK United	4
4	(Republic of Ireland) Daniel McCarthy	UCC	4
11	11 players		3

==== Hat-tricks ====
Player	For	Against	Result	Date
(Republic of Ireland) Calum Flynn	Villa	CK United	3–3 (A)	19 September 2026
(Republic of Ireland) Zach Gorman	Letterkenny Rovers	TU Dublin	6–3 (H)	26 September 2026
(Republic of Ireland) Dean Ebbe	Lucan United	Cockhill Celtic	5–2 (A)	10 October 2026

== See also ==
- 2026 League of Ireland Premier Division
- 2026 League of Ireland First Division
- 2026 League of Ireland Women's Premier Division
- 2026 FAI Cup
