= List of association football venues in the Republic of Ireland =

The following is a list of association football venues in the Republic of Ireland, ranked in order of capacity, with the minimum capacity being 500.

== Current stadiums ==
#	Image	Stadium	Total Capacity	Seating Capacity	UEFA rank	City	Home team
1	Wide-angle view from pitch-level, showing all three tiers of the stadium as well as the roof.	Aviva Stadium	51,711		4/4 stars	Ballsbridge	Republic of Ireland national football team
2	Floodlit stadium at night, as fans start to leave following a rugby league game.	Thomond Park	25,600	15,100	N/A	Limerick	
3		Tallaght Stadium	10,547		4/4 stars	Tallaght	Shamrock Rovers F.C.
4		Turners Cross	7,125		3/4 stars	Cork	Cork City F.C.
5	Aerial view of stadium, from the side, at oblique angle. The word 'Shels' is spelled out in different-coloured seating.	Tolka Park	6,450	4,455	2/4 stars	Drumcondra, Dublin	Shelbourne F.C.
6		Richmond Park	5,500	2,800	2/4 stars	Inchicore	St Patrick's Athletic F.C.
7		Waterford RSC	5,154	3,010	2/4 stars	Waterford	Waterford United F.C.
8		Bishopsgate	5,097	4,960	2/4 stars	Longford	Longford Town F.C.
9		Oriel Park	4,500	3,100	2/4 stars	Dundalk	Dundalk F.C.
10		Dalymount Park	4,443	4,000	2/4 stars	Phibsborough, Dublin	Bohemian F.C.
11		Eamonn Deacy Park	4,323	3,300	2/4 stars	Galway	Galway United F.C.
12		Finn Park	4,200	300	1/4 stars	Ballybofey	Finn Harps F.C.
13		Bishopstown Stadium	4,000			Bishopstown	Cork City F.C.
14		The Showgrounds	3,873		2/4 stars	Sligo	Sligo Rovers F.C.
15	view of the entrance to United Park with a sign displaying the words Sullivan and Lambe Park.	United Park	3,500	1,500	1/4 stars	Drogheda	Drogheda United F.C.
16		Markets Field	3,075	1,710 (Note: It is unclear if this figure includes the ground's demountable stand. As of 2025, the stand — which seated 360 people — remains closed after a row of seats collapsed during a game in 2022.)	2/4 stars	Limerick	Treaty United F.C.
17		Athlone Town Stadium	3,000	2,024	2/4 stars	Athlone	Athlone Town A.F.C.
18		Buckley Park	3,000	1,850		Kilkenny	
19		UCD Bowl	3,000	1,500	2/4 stars	Belfield, Dublin	UCD
20	Wide-angle view from behind a corner flag, as a corner is about to be taken.	Carlisle Grounds	2,642		2/4 stars	Bray	Bray Wanderers F.C.
21		Jackman Park	2,450	261		Limerick	
22		Ferrycarrig Park	2,262	609	1/4 stars	Crossabeg	Wexford F.C.
23	An image — taken inside Station Road in 2007 — of the Main Stand consisting of a roof, 250 yellow and blue seats as well as a raised, windowed area overlooking the pitch.	Station Road	2,180	250		Newbridge, County Kildare	Newbridge Town F.C.
24		Maginn Park	2,000	250		Buncrana	Inishowen Football League
25	view of clubhouse and stand at Gortakeegan.	Gortakeegan	2,000	620		Monaghan	Monaghan United
26		Drom Soccer Park	2,000	N/A		Salthill	Salthill Devon
27		St Colman's Park	1,970	1,850	1/4 stars	Cobh	Cobh Ramblers F.C.
28		Whitehall Stadium	1,800	N/A		Whitehall, Dublin	Home Farm F.C.
29		Celtic Park	1,500	550		Castlebar	Castlebar Celtic
30		Leah Victoria Park	1,500	N/A		Tullamore	Tullamore Town
31		Dry Arch Park	1,500			Letterkenny	Bonagee United F.C.
32		Mounthawk Park	1,200	500	1/4 stars	Tralee, County Kerry	Kerry F.C.
33		Leckview Park	1,000	200		Letterkenny	Letterkenny Rovers F.C.
34		Jackson Park	1,000	N/A		Kilternan	Wayside Celtic/UCD Waves
35		Hawkins Lane	1,000	75		Tullow	F.C. Carlow/Parkville United
36		Cahermoneen	1,000	N/A		Tralee, County Kerry	Tralee Dynamos
37		Irishtown Stadium	1,000	N/A		Irishtown, Dublin	St. Patrick's C.Y.F.C./Liffey Wanderers
38		Fahy's Field	1,000	N/A		Galway	Mervue United
39		Charlie O'Donnell Sports Grounds	1,000	N/A		Buncrana	Cockhill Celtic F.C.
40		Mardyke Sports Ground	800	800		Mardyke, Cork	UCC

== Proposed stadiums and redevelopments ==
Stadium	Capacity	City	Home team	Status
Richmond Arena	12,000	Inchicore, County Dublin	St Patrick's Athletic	Not progressed
Dalymount Park	7,880	Phibsborough, County Dublin	Bohemians F.C.	Proposed
Donegal Community Stadium	6,130	Stranorlar, County Donegal	Finn Harps	Under construction
The Showgrounds, Sligo	6,000	Sligo, County Sligo	Sligo Rovers	Proposed
Market's Field	5,000	Limerick, County Limerick	Limerick	On hold
New Drogheda United Stadium	5,000	Drogheda, County Louth	Drogheda United	Not progressed

Redevelopments of current stadiums are in italics.

== See also ==
- List of stadiums in Ireland by capacity
- List of Gaelic Athletic Association stadiums
- List of association football stadiums by capacity
- List of European stadiums by capacity
- Lists of stadiums
