= Women's Under 17 National League (Ireland) =

- Organising body: Women's Football Association of Ireland; Football Association of Ireland
- Founded: 2018
- Country: Ireland
- Confederation: UEFA
- Number of clubs: 15
- Level on pyramid: 1
- Current champions: Cork City W.F.C.
- Most championships: Shelbourne (1); Galway (1) Cork City (1)
- Website: wnl.fai.ie

The Women's Under-17 National League is the under-17 division of the Women's National League and the first under-age national league in women's football.

The league was launched in 2018 with 11 clubs. Republic of Ireland internationals Heather Payne and Isibeal Atkinson, Tom Dennigan, Continental Tyres General Sales Manager and FAI Director of Competitions Fran Gavin helped launch the league in July 2018 at the FAI National Training Centre.

== Format ==
The inaugural season consisted of 11 teams and began mid-late July 2018 with a truncated season with two groups. Competing in Group One were: Athlone Town, Donegal League, Peamount United, Shelbourne, Sligo Rovers and Galway Women's and competing in Group Two were: Cork City, Greystones, Limerick, UCD Waves, and Wexford Youths. Following the conclusion of the 10 rounds of fixtures, the top two teams from each group played in play-off mode the semi-finals and final to decide the winner.

In December 2018, the Women's National League Committee has accepted an expression of interest to compete in the 2019 Under-17 Women's National League season from Bohemian FC. With the addition of Bohemians, the League now consists of 12 teams, with six teams competing in two groups before the final stage of the competition. The 2019 season began on the weekend ending Sunday 7 April and there has also been a WU17 League Cup introduced along with a Shield competition in the finals stage of the competition.

The 2020 season saw the introduction of a representative team from Carlow-Kilkenny to the league as well as League of Ireland teams Bray Wanderers and Shamrock Rovers. The three new clubs brought the total number of teams to fifteen. The format of 2 groups before the final stage of the competition was initially maintained. However, the start of the season fell victim to the lockdown measurements introduced by the government to tackle the COVID-19 pandemic. A new format and start date were published on 23 July 2020 after the phased reopening of the country. The league would instead be split into 3 groups of 5 teams. The top two teams in each group, alongside the two best third-placed teams, qualified for the quarter-finals with the competition then changing to a knock-out format.

In 2021 Waterford F.C. joined the league, entering a WU17 academy side.

The 2022 season saw several changes. Bray and Greystones announced a partnership, with the two clubs running one team under the Bray Wanderers name. The Donegal League also formed a partnership with Finn Harps and the Inishowen Women's League. A new club was welcomed to the league when Cobh Ramblers entered a team in partnership with Springfield Ramblers.

St Patrick's Athletic and their partner club, Cherry Orchard, were accepted into the league for the start of the 2023 season.

== Teams ==
Locations of Women's U17 National League Teams
Locations of Women's U17 National League Teams in Dublin

Team	Home town/suburb	Stadium
Athlone Town U17	Athlone	Athlone Town Stadium
Bray Wanderers U17	Bray	Carlisle Grounds
Bohemians U17	Phibsborough	Oscar Traynor Centre
Carlow-Kilkenny U17	Kilkenny	Derdimus Park
Cork City U17	Cork	Bishopstown Stadium
Donegal League U17	Donegal	Diamond Park, Ballyare
Galway U17	Galway	Dangan Sports Facilities
Greystones United U17	Greystones	The Woodlands
Treaty United U17	Limerick	Pike Rovers Sportsground
Peamount United U17	Newcastle, County Dublin	Greenogue
Shamrock Rovers U17	Tallaght	Roadstone Sports Ground
Shelbourne U17	Santry	AUL Complex
Sligo Rovers U17	Sligo	Sligo IT
DLR Waves U17	Dún Laoghaire	Marley Park
Wexford Youths U17	Crossabeg	Ferrycarrig Park

=== Timeline ===
League member Former member Future member

== Champions ==
Year	Winner	Runner up	Result	Venue	Notes
2018	Shelbourne	Galway	2–0	Drom Soccer Park	
2019	Galway	Wexford	3–1	Eamonn Deacy Park	
2020	Cork City	Shamrock Rovers	2–0	Athlone Town Stadium	
2021	Treaty United	Peamount United	3–2	Athlone Town Stadium	

== Under 17 National League Cup Champions ==
Year	Winner	Runner up	Result	Venue	Notes
2019	Galway	Peamount United	2-1	Eamonn Deacy Park	

== Under 17 Player of the Year ==
Year	Player	Team	Notes
2018	Emily Whelan	Shelbourne	
2019	Kayla Brady	Galway	
