= League of Ireland U17 Division =

SSE Airtricity U17 League of Ireland
- Organising body: Football Association of Ireland (FAI)
- Founded: 2015; 10 years ago
- Country: Republic of Ireland (22 teams)
- Other club from: Northern Ireland (1 team)
- Confederation: UEFA
- Number of clubs: 23
- Domestic cup: U17 Mark Farren Memorial Cup
- Current champions: Bohemians (1st title)
- Most championships: St Patrick's Athletic (2 titles)
- Website: http://www.sseairtricityleague.ie/

The League of Ireland U17 Division is the under-17 division of the League of Ireland. Like the Premier Division, the First Division and the National U19 League the National U17 League is currently sponsored by SSE Airtricity and as a result it is also known as the SSE Airtricity National U17 League.
FAI High-Performance Director Ruud Dokter and then Republic of Ireland assistant manager Roy Keane officially launched the inaugural SSE Airtricity National U17 League at FAI headquarters in Abbotstown on 27 July 2015.

== Teams ==
=== Northern Elite Division ===
Locations of Northern Elite Division Teams

| Team | Location | Stadium |
|---|---|---|
| Athlone Town U17 | Athlone | Lissywollen |
| Bohemians U17 | Phibsborough | St Aidans, Santry |
| Derry City U17 | Derry | Brandywell Stadium |
| Drogheda United U17 | Drogheda | United Park |
| Dundalk U17 | Dundalk | Oriel Park |
| Finn Harps U17 | Ballybofey | Killygordon |
| Longford Town U17 | Longford | City Calling Stadium |
| Monaghan United Cavan Football Partnership U17 | Monaghan | Gortakeegan |
| Shelbourne U17 | Drumcondra, Dublin | AUL Complex |
| Sligo Rovers U17 | Sligo | The Showgrounds |
| St Patrick's Athletic U17 | Inchicore | IT Blanchardstown |

=== Southern Elite Division ===
Locations of Southern Elite Division teams

| Team | Hometown/Suburb | Ground |
|---|---|---|
| Bray Wanderers U17 | Bray | Carlisle Grounds |
| Cabinteely U17 | Cabinteely | AUL Complex |
| Carlow-Kilkenny F.C. U17 | Kilkenny | Derdimus Park |
| Cobh Ramblers U17 | Cobh | St. Colman's Park |
| Cork City U17 | Cork | Bishopstown Stadium |
| Galway United U17 | Galway | Eamonn Deacy Park |
| Kerry U17 | Tralee | Mounthawk Park |
| Limerick U17 | Limerick | Jackman Park |
| Shamrock Rovers U17 | Tallaght | Tallaght Stadium |
| Wexford U17 | Crossabeg | Ferrycarrig Park |
| Waterford U17 | Waterford | Waterford RSC |
| UCD U17 | Belfield, Dublin | UCD Bowl |

Kerry District League joins the Southern Elite Division as it has been awarded Under-17 National League licence for 2016 season.
Carlow-Kilkenny F.C. joins the Southern Elite Division as it has been awarded Under-17 National League licence for 2019 season.

== U17 League of Ireland Champions ==
| Year | Winner | Runner up | Result | Venue |
|---|---|---|---|---|
| 2015 | Shamrock Rovers | St Patrick's Athletic | 3-2 | Tallaght Stadium |
| 2016 | St Patrick's Athletic | UCD | 2-1 | UCD Bowl |
| 2017 | Cork City | Bohemians | 0-0 (4-2 pens) | Turners Cross |
| 2018 | Finn Harps | Shamrock Rovers | 3-0 | Maginn Park |
| 2019 | St Patrick's Athletic | Bohemians | 4-0 | Richmond Park |
| 2020 | Bohemians | Shamrock Rovers | 2-0 | UCD Bowl |

== U17 Mark Farren Memorial Cup Champions ==
| Year | Winner | Runner up | Result | Venue |
|---|---|---|---|---|
| 2016 | Bohemians | St Patrick's Athletic | 2–0 | Richmond Park |
| 2017 | Waterford | Sligo Rovers | 4–2 | Waterford RSC |
| 2018 | Finn Harps | Cork City | 1–0 | Finn Park |
| 2019 | Bohemians | Kerry | 5–1 | Mounthawk Park |

== U17 Player of the Year ==
| Year | Player | Team |
|---|---|---|
| 2018 | Darragh Ellison | Finn Harps |
| 2023 | Mary Philips | Athlone Town FC |
