= Oisín O'Reilly (footballer) =

Irish footballer (born 2000)

Personal information
- Date of birth: 27 November 2000 (age 25)
- Place of birth: Kiltoom, Athlone, Ireland
- Height: 1.89 m (6 ft 2 in)
- Positions: Centre-back; full-back

Team information
- Current team: Mayo FC
- Number: 27

Youth career
- 2016–2018: Athlone Town
- 2018–2019: Sligo Rovers

Senior career*
Years	Team	Apps	(Gls)
2020	Athlone Town	2	(0)
2021	Ballinahown		
2022–2023	Galway United	23	(0)
2024	Treaty United	22	(1)
2025–2026	Ballinahown		
2026–	Mayo FC	3	(0)
- * Club domestic league appearances and goals as of 25 September 2026 (UTC)

Oisín O'Reilly (born 27 November 2000) is an Irish footballer who plays as a centre-back for FAI National League club Mayo FC.

O'Reilly played youth football with Athlone Town and Sligo Rovers before starting his professional career with Athlone Town. He would go on to play for Ballinahown, Galway United and Treaty United.

== Youth career ==
O'Reilly played youth football for Athlone Town and Sligo Rovers.

== Club career ==
=== Athlone Town ===
In 2020, O'Reilly rejoined League of Ireland First Division side Athlone Town this time as a senior player. After playing in the first two games of the season, the season was suspended due to the COVID-19 pandemic, O'Reilly did not return to the club after the season resumed.

=== Galway United ===
On 6 February 2022, O'Reilly signed for First Division club Galway United for their 2022 season. That season the club finished third before losing to Waterford in the play-offs.

In his second season with the club, O'Reilly played an important role as Galway United won the First Division by 25 points and were promoted back to the Premier Division for the first time in 6 years.

=== Treaty United ===
On 29 December 2023, O'Reilly signed for First Division club Treaty United. On 19 July 2024, O'Reilly scored the winning penalty in a penalty shoot-out against Kilbarrack United in the second round of the FAI Cup. On 20 September 2024, O'Reilly scored his first goal for the club in a 1–2 defeat to his former club Athlone Town at Markets Field.

=== Mayo FC ===
On 1 August 2026, O'Reilly signed for FAI National League club Mayo FC ahead of both the inaugural season of the league and the club's inaugural season as a senior team.

== Personal life ==
O'Reilly attended ATU Sligo where he played for the college's football team.

His sister, Caoimhe O'Reilly played as a goalkeeper in the League of Ireland Women's Premier Division for Sligo Rovers.

== Career statistics ==
=== Club ===
As of match played 1 August 2026

Appearances and goals by club, season and competition
Club	Season	League			National cup (Note: Includes FAI Cup)		Other		Total	
Club	Season	Division	Apps	Goals	Apps	Goals	Apps	Goals	Apps	Goals
Athlone Town	2020	LOI First Division	2	0	0	0	0	0	2	0
Galway United	2022	LOI First Division	7	0	1	0	0	0	8	0
Galway United	2023	LOI First Division	16	0	3	0	0	0	19	0
Galway United	Total		23	0	4	0	0	0	27	0
Treaty United	2024	LOI First Division	22	1	2	0	2 (Note: Appearances in the Munster Senior Cup)	0	26	1
Mayo FC	2026	FAI National League	3	0	—		—		3	0
Career total			50	1	6	0	2	0	58	1

== Honours ==
Galway United

- League of Ireland First Division: 2023
