= Mark Byrne =

Irish footballer

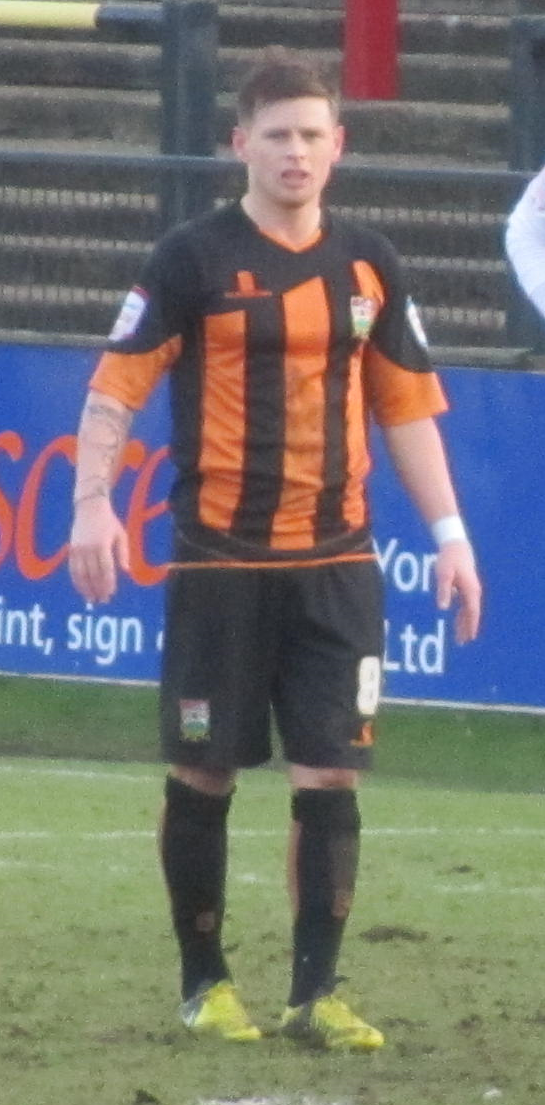
- Byrne playing for Barnet in 2013.

Personal information
- Full name: Mark Byrne
- Date of birth: 9 November 1988 (age 38)
- Place of birth: Kilnamanagh, Dublin, Ireland
- Height: 5 ft 9 in (1.75 m)
- Position: Midfielder

Team information
- Current team: Crumlin United

Youth career
- Crumlin United

Senior career*
| Years | Team | Apps | (Gls) |
| 2007–2011 | Nottingham Forest | 2 | (0) |
| 2009 | → Burton Albion (loan) | 7 | (0) |
| 2009–2010 | → Rushden & Diamonds (loan) | 42 | (6) |
| 2010–2011 | → Barnet (loan) | 28 | (6) |
| 2011–2014 | Barnet | 119 | (13) |
| 2014–2016 | Newport County | 88 | (6) |
| 2016–2020 | Gillingham | 136 | (8) |
| 2020 | Shelbourne | 10 | (0) |
| 2021–2022 | Bray Wanderers | 28 | (0) |
| 2022–2023 | Crumlin United | | |
| 2023– | Lucan United | | |
- * Club domestic league appearances and goals as of 23 August 2026

Mark Byrne (born 9 November 1988) is an Irish footballer who plays as a midfielder for FAI National League club Lucan United.

== Club career ==
=== Nottingham Forest ===
Byrne signed for Nottingham Forest in July 2007 from Dublin schoolboy side, Crumlin United after unsuccessful trials at Leicester City and Stoke City. He was named as a substitute in Forest's 1–1 draw at home to Walsall in March 2008. He then made his professional debut for Forest as a 70th-minute substitute on 5 April 2008 in a 3–1 victory against Cheltenham Town.

With the Reds gaining promotion, manager Colin Calderwood commented that he would be given the chance to impress next season after Forest's promotion to the Championship in the upcoming 2008–09 season.

=== Burton Albion (loan) ===
On 13 March 2009, Byrne was sent on loan to Conference National side Burton Albion for the remainder of the season, featuring in seven of the remaining eleven fixtures before being promoted, as champions, to the Football League.

=== Rushden and Diamonds (loan) ===
On 20 July 2009, Byrne joined Conference National side Rushden & Diamonds on an initial six-month loan, but eventually signed on for the rest of the season. The Irishman made 44 appearances with Rushden & Diamonds in 2009–10 scoring seven goals in the process, including the equaliser in Diamonds' Conference Premier Semi-Final First Leg vs Oxford United. He received two awards at the end-of-season presentation night. He left Nene Park at the end of his loan spell at the season's end.

=== Barnet ===
At the start of the 2010–11 season, he joined Barnet until 1 January 2011 when his loan spell was cut short due to injury. Byrne returned to Barnet on loan in March 2011. After his release from Nottingham Forest in June, Byrne signed a two-year deal with Barnet.

Byrne then consolidated his position within the Barnet first team, playing a central role in midfield, though at times, he was shifted on to the right wing. He scored in the first game of the season on 6 August, against Morecambe at the Globe Arena, scoring in the 76th minute in a 1–0 win for Barnet. He next scored on 19 November, with a 98th-minute goal against Bristol Rovers, sealing a 2–0 win at the Memorial Stadium. He scored again in the League on 21 January, with a 48th-minute equaliser against Northampton Town at Sixfields Stadium. Next, he scored against Rotherham United on 3 March, with the opening goal in the 7th minute at Underhill. Barnet went on to draw the game 1–1. Finally, he scored a pivotal goal on the final day of the season away against Burton Albion, a game which Barnet needed to win to seal their spot in the Football League – he scored the opening goal in the 6th minute. Barnet would go on to win the game 2–1, thus maintaining their Football League status. He became a popular figure among Barnet fans for his hardworking attitude and tough tackling.

In the following season, Byrne's position was shifted more prominently on to the right wing, fitting in with new player-manager Edgar Davids' 4–5–1 formation with two wingers, and three central midfielders. Byrne was one of few players who stayed at Barnet following the previous season. He would go on to play a prominent role for Barnet, scoring 2 penalties in the League, with a total of 3 goals in the League – the joint 4th highest goal tally for Barnet. Due to a shortage of right backs following injuries to Barry Fuller, and a previous long-term injury to Danny Senda, Byrne also filled in at right back for Barnet, with moderate success. He made 40 appearances during the League.

At the end of the 2013–14 season, Byrne was released by Barnet. In total, he played 166 times for the Bees, scoring 19 goals.

=== Newport County ===
In July 2014 Justin Edinburgh signed Byrne for Newport County. Edinburgh had been Byrne's manager at Rushden and Diamonds. He made his debut for Newport against Wycombe Wanderers on 9 August 2014. Byrne scored his first goal for Newport in the 1–0 win over Southend United on 21 October 2014. Byrne was selected as Newport's player of the year for the 2015–16 season. He was offered a new contract by Newport at the end of the 2015–16 season but the offer was withdrawn and he was released after he failed to accept the contract by the deadline of 10 June 2016.

=== Gillingham ===
On 15 June 2016 Edinburgh again signed Byrne, this time for Gillingham on a two-year contract.

He scored his first goal for the club in the 2–1 win over Premier League side Watford in the second round of the 2016–17 EFL Cup.

He signed a new two-year contract with the club in June 2018, having been named the Player of the Season at the conclusion of the 2017–18 campaign.

Byrne was released by the club at the end of the injury-stricken 2019–20 season. In total, he made 157 appearances in all competitions for the Kent side, scoring 11 goals.

=== Shelbourne ===
Byrne signed for newly- promoted League of Ireland Premier Division side Shelbourne on 21 August 2020, making his debut against Shamrock Rovers in a crucial league match. Byrne made 13 appearances for the club in all competitions as they were relegated to the League of Ireland First Division.

=== Bray Wanderers ===
On 22 February 2021, Byrne signed for League of Ireland First Division side Bray Wanderers.

=== Crumlin United ===
On 9 February 2022, having spent thirteen years away from the club, Byrne once again signed for Crumlin United.

== International career ==
In 2005 Byrne won a bronze medal playing for Republic of Ireland U18 in the European Youth Olympic Festival.

== Career statistics ==
As of match played on 19 November 2021

Appearances and goals by club, season and competition
| Club | Season | League | | | National Cup | | League Cup | | Other | | Total | |
| Club | Season | Division | Apps | Goals | Apps | Goals | Apps | Goals | Apps | Goals | Apps | Goals |
|---|---|---|---|---|---|---|---|---|---|---|---|---|
| Nottingham Forest | 2007–08 | Championship | 1 | 0 | 0 | 0 | 0 | 0 | 0 | 0 | 1 | 0 |
| Nottingham Forest | 2008–09 | Championship | 1 | 0 | 1 | 0 | 0 | 0 | 0 | 0 | 2 | 0 |
| Nottingham Forest | Total | | 2 | 0 | 1 | 0 | 0 | 0 | 0 | 0 | 3 | 0 |
| Burton Albion (loan) | 2008–09 | Conference Premier | 7 | 0 | 0 | 0 | — | | 0 | 0 | 7 | 0 |
| Rushden & Diamonds (loan) | 2009–10 | Conference Premier | 42 | 6 | 2 | 1 | — | | 0 | 0 | 44 | 7 |
| Barnet (loan) | 2010–11 | League Two | 28 | 6 | 1 | 0 | 1 | 0 | 1 (Note: Appearances in the Football League Trophy) | 0 | 31 | 4 |
| Barnet | 2011–12 | League Two | 43 | 5 | 2 | 0 | 2 | 0 | 6 | 0 | 53 | 5 |
| Barnet | 2012–13 | League Two | 40 | 3 | 1 | 0 | 0 | 0 | 1 | 0 | 42 | 3 |
| Barnet | 2013–14 | Conference Premier | 36 | 5 | 2 | 0 | — | | 2 (Note: Appearances in the FA Trophy) | 0 | 40 | 5 |
| Barnet | Barnet total | | 119 | 13 | 5 | 0 | 2 | 0 | 9 | 0 | 135 | 13 |
| Newport County | 2014–15 | League Two | 42 | 4 | 1 | 0 | 1 | 0 | 0 | 0 | 44 | 4 |
| Newport County | 2015–16 | League Two | 46 | 2 | 4 | 1 | 1 | 0 | 1 | 0 | 52 | 3 |
| Newport County | Newport total | | 88 | 6 | 5 | 1 | 2 | 0 | 1 | 0 | 96 | 7 |
| Gillingham | 2016–17 | League One | 31 | 1 | 0 | 0 | 2 | 1 | 2 (Note: Appearances in the EFL Trophy) | 0 | 35 | 2 |
| Gillingham | 2017–18 | League One | 42 | 3 | 3 | 0 | 0 | 0 | 2 | 1 | 47 | 4 |
| Gillingham | 2018–19 | League One | 45 | 4 | 5 | 0 | 1 | 0 | 1 | 0 | 52 | 4 |
| Gillingham | 2019–20 | League One | 18 | 0 | 3 | 1 | 1 | 0 | 1 | 0 | 23 | 1 |
| Gillingham | Gillingham total | | 136 | 8 | 11 | 1 | 4 | 1 | 6 | 1 | 157 | 11 |
| Shelbourne | 2020 | League of Ireland Premier Division | 10 | 0 | 2 | 0 | — | | 1 (Note: Appearances in the 2020 League of Ireland play-offs) | 0 | 13 | 0 |
| Bray Wanderers | 2021 | League of Ireland First Division | 28 | 0 | 1 | 0 | — | | 3 (Note: Appearances in 2021 League of Ireland promotion/relegation playoffs) | 0 | 32 | 0 |
| Career total | | | 457 | 39 | 26 | 3 | 9 | 1 | 19 | 1 | 518 | 42 |

== Honours ==
- Republic of Ireland U18:
  - European Youth Olympic Festival: Bronze Medal

=== Individual ===
- Rushden & Diamonds Players' Player of the Year (2009–10)
- Rushden & Diamonds Internet Forum Player of the Year (2009–10)
- Newport County Player of the Season, Player's Player of the Year, Goal of the Season (v Blackburn Rovers (FA Cup 3rd Round)), Supporters Club Away Player of the Year, Supporters Club Player of the Year (2015–16)
- Gillingham Player of the Season, Goal of the Season (v Bristol Rovers (League One), Away Player of the Year, Players' Player of the Year (2017–18)
