= Noe Baba =

First African-born footballer to captain an Irish team (born 1996)

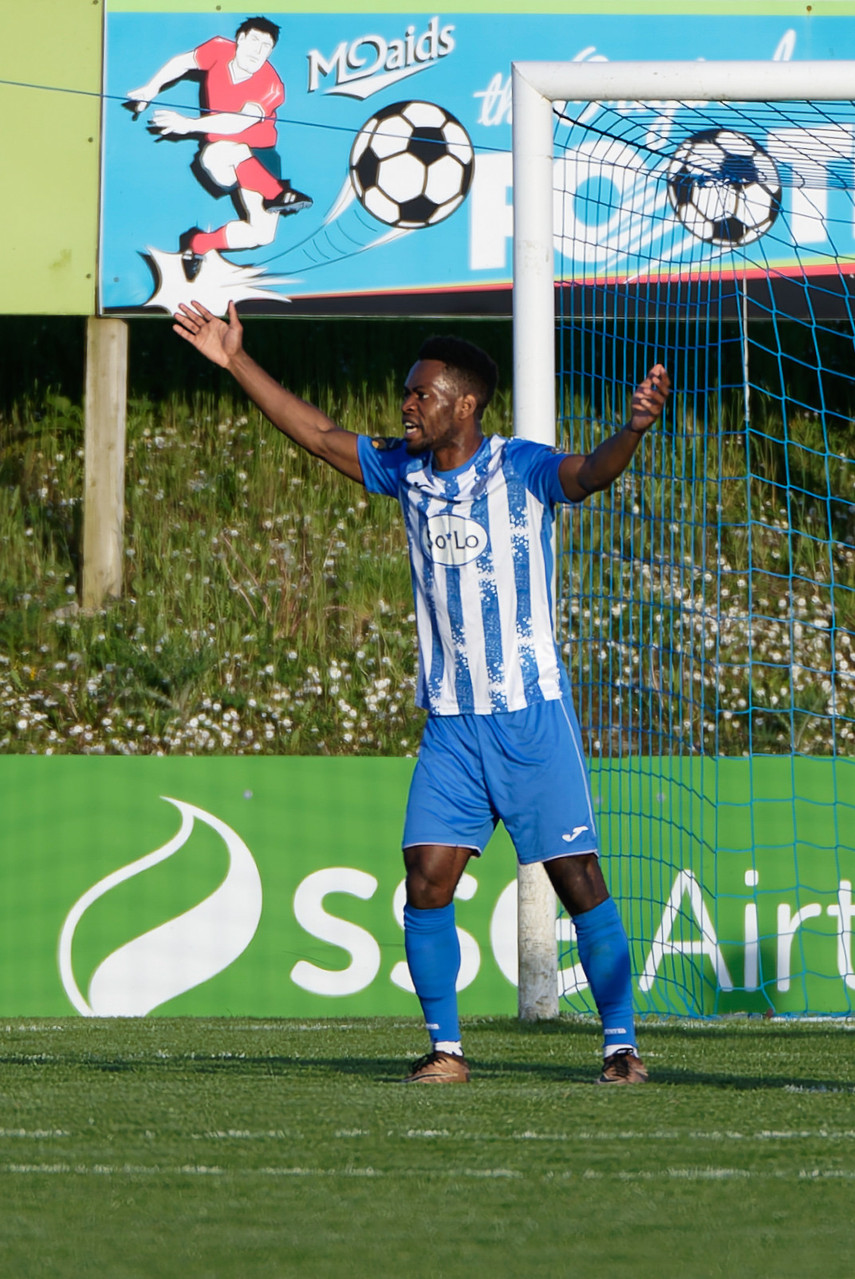
- Baba with Finn Harps

Personal information
- Date of birth: 8 August 1996 (age 30)
- Place of birth: Yaoundé, Cameroon
- Height: 1.78 m (5 ft 10 in)
- Positions: Defender; midfielder

Team information
- Current team: Athlone Town
- Number: 14

Youth career
- 2012–2015: Fulham
- 2015–2017: Birmingham City

Senior career*
Years	Team	Apps	(Gls)
2017–2018	Macclesfield Town	12	(0)
2018	Waterford	7	(0)
2019	Lupo Martini Wolfsburg	11	(0)
2019–2021	Fortuna Köln	28	(0)
2021–2022	KFC Uerdingen	35	(1)
2023–2024	Finn Harps	61	(2)
2025	Athlone Town	24	(0)
2026–	Mayo	0	(0)

International career
2011–2012	Republic of Ireland U16	3	(0)
2012	Republic of Ireland U17	3	(0)
2012–2015	Republic of Ireland U19	30	(0)
2015	Republic of Ireland U21	1	(0)
- * Club domestic league appearances and goals as of 18:49, 6 July 2026 (UTC)

Noe Baba (born 8 August 1996) is a professional footballer who plays as a defender or midfielder for FAI National League club Mayo. Born in Cameroon, he is a Republic of Ireland youth international. He is the first African-born footballer to captain an Irish team.

== Early life ==
Baba moved from Cameroon to Ireland at the age of ten. He boxed as a child.

== Club career ==
In 2015, Baba joined the youth academy of English side Birmingham City, where he was described as "impressed in Richard Beale's side... one to watch... although Blues are already well-stocked in central midfield".

Baba played in Germany for three clubs: Lupo Martini Wolfsburg, Fortuna Köln, and KFC Uerdingan. In Ireland he played for Castlebar Celtic and Waterford; while in England he played for Macclesfield.

In July 2026, it was announced that Baba had signed for his hometown club Mayo ahead of their inaugural season at senior level.

== International career ==
Baba captained the Republic of Ireland national under-17 football team. He was described as "A key player for Paul Doolin's U19s".

== Style of play ==
Baba has been described as "a versatile player... plays primarily as a defensive midfielder but can also feature as a full-back".

== Personal life ==
Baba is a native of County Mayo, Ireland. He has regarded England international Steven Gerrard, Brazil international Ronaldinho, and France international Claude Makélélé as his football idols.
