= Dean Ebbe =

Irish professional footballer

Personal information
- Date of birth: 16 July 1994 (age 32)
- Place of birth: Dublin, Ireland
- Height: 1.88 m (6 ft 2 in)
- Position: Striker

Team information
- Current team: Lucan United
- Number: 9

Senior career*
Years	Team	Apps	(Gls)
2012–2013	Shamrock Rovers	1	(0)
2013	Longford Town	8	(1)
2014	Athlone Town	3	(0)
2015	Cabinteely	1	(0)
2015	Collinstown		
2016	Bluebell United		
2017	Inverness Caledonian Thistle	3	(0)
2017	Bluebell United		
2018–2022	The New Saints	70	(24)
2022	→ Bala Town (loan)	11	(8)
2022–2023	Crusaders	25	(1)
2023–2024	Manchester 62	6	(2)
2024	Athlone Town	35	(15)
2025	Dundalk	35	(10)
2026	Ballymena United	8	(0)
2026–	Lucan United	6	(4)
- * Club domestic league appearances and goals as of 20:19, 10 October 2026 (UTC)

Dean Ebbe (born 16 July 1994) is an Irish professional footballer who plays as a striker for FAI National League club Lucan United.

== Career ==
After playing for Shamrock Rovers, Longford Town, Athlone Town, Cabinteely, Collinstown and Bluebell United, Ebbe signed for Scottish club Inverness Caledonian Thistle in January 2017. After leaving Inverness he returned to Bluebell United before signing for Welsh Premier League side The New Saints in January 2018. He stayed with the club until the end of the 2021–22 season playing with them in Europe, and winning league and cup winners medals.

In January 2022 he joined Bala Town on loan until the end of the season He scored 11 goals in 15 appearances in all competitions during the loan spell. leaving the club at completion of his loan spell.

In June 2022 Ebbe signed for Crusaders.

After one season, he moved to Gibraltar to reunite with former TNS coach Anthony Limbrick at Manchester 62.

Ebbe returned to Ireland in January 2024, signing for a second spell at Athlone Town in the League of Ireland First Division.

He moved to newly relegated League of Ireland First Division club Dundalk ahead of their first season back in the second tier in 2025.

In January 2026, Ebbe returned to the NIFL Premiership with Ballymena United.

On 26 July 2026, Ebbe signed for Lucan United ahead of their inaugural FAI National League season.

== Honours ==
Crusaders

- Irish Cup: 2022–23
- NIFL Charity Shield: 2022

Dundalk

- League of Ireland First Division: 2025
- Leinster Senior Cup: 2024–25
