= TU Dublin F.C. =

Association football club in Dublin

TU Dublin
- Full name: Technological University Dublin Football Club
- Founded: December 2025; 10 months ago
- Ground: TU Dublin Blanchardstown
- Coordinates: 53°24′21.6″N 6°22′53.4″W
- Manager: Jamie Moore
- League: FAI National League
- Website: sport.tudublin.ie/clubs/soccer
Home colours	Away colours

Technological University Dublin Football Club, known as TU Dublin are an Irish association football club based in Blanchardstown, Dublin, representing Technological University Dublin. The club's senior men's team compete in the FAI National League.

== History ==
With Technological University Dublin having previously entered representative teams in university football, the TU Dublin Football Club was officially formed in advance of December 2025, when TU Dublin were announced by the Football Association of Ireland as one of the 15 founding member clubs to take part in the inaugural FAI National League season starting in 2026 as the new third tier in the Republic of Ireland football league system. In August 2026, Jamie Moore was named as the club's first ever manager. The club's first competitive game was announced to be an away trip to Salthill Devon, which ended in a 2–2 draw on 6 September 2026, with Emmanuel Milongo scoring both of his side's first ever goals.

== Current Squad ==
As of 8 October 2026

Note: Flags indicate national team as defined under FIFA eligibility rules; some limited exceptions apply. Players may hold more than one non-FIFA nationality.

No.	Pos.	Nation	Player
1	GK	IRL	Jamie Gamble
2	DF	IRL	Aaron Corish
3	DF	IRL	Jack Kavanagh
4	MF	IRL	Jack O'Donnell
5	DF	IRL	Emmanuel Milongo
6	MF	IRL	Matthew O'Brien (captain)
7	MF	IRL	Alex Fallon
8	MF	IRL	Thomas Morgan
9	FW	IRL	Leo Crabb
10	MF	IRL	Kian Reddy
11	MF	IRL	Adam Farrell

No.	Pos.	Nation	Player
12	DF	IRL	Adam Mulhall
13	MF	IRL	Joey O'Riordan
14	MF	IRL	Thomas McDonnell
15	DF	IRL	Ben Sullivan
17	MF	IRL	Ciaran Murray
19	MF	IRL	Adam Byrne
21	DF	IRL	Ryan Graham
22	DF	IRL	Tjay Olusanya
23	GK	IRL	Jamie Molloy
24	DF	IRL	Tom McLoughlin
25	DF	IRL	Charles McGee

== Grounds ==
The club play their games on the astroturf facility at TU Dublin Blanchardstown campus. The pitch surface is a FIFA certified full-size synthetic pitch measuring 100m x 64m.
