= Killarney Celtic F.C. =

- Full name: Killarney Celtic Football Club
- Founded: 1976; 50 years ago
- Ground: Celtic Park
- Chairman: Philip O'Callaghan
- Manager: Brian Spillane
- League: FAI National League; Kerry District League Premier A
- Website: www.killarneyceltic.ie
Home colours

Killarney Celtic Football Club is an Irish association football club based in Killarney, County Kerry. Founded in 1976, the club qualified for the FAI Cup in 2017. Killarney Celtic was announced as one of the 15 teams participating in the FAI National League inaugural 2026 season. The club plays their home games at Celtic Park, in its hometown Killarney.

== History ==
Killarney Celtic was founded in 1976 by locals Mike Daly and Billy Healy to give interested players a chance to play soccer on a regular basis. The club joined the Kerry District League (KDL) the same year and their first competitive game was played on 24 October 1976. In the team's first season, they went unbeaten in the league and gained promotion to Division 2. A second unbeaten season meant Killarney were promoted to the top flight of the KDL. The club remained in Kerry's top division until 1998 when they left for the Munster Senior League. By 2006, the club had an under-14 team.

In 2017, Killarney beat Boyle Celtic of Roscommon to qualify for the first round of the FAI Cup. They drew Cobh Wanderers away from home in the following round, and were defeated by their fellow Munster side.

Killarney made it to the quarterfinals of the 2022–23 FAI Junior Cup, losing on penalties to Limerick opponents Ballynanty Rovers. In 2025, the club won their seventh consecutive Kerry District League Premier A title. On 19 December 2025, Killarney Celtic were announced as one of the founding clubs in the FAI National League. The club are expected to compete in the truncated season of the league, beginning in Autumn 2026. In June 2026, the club announced Brian Spillane as their new manager.

== Players ==
As of 12 September 2026

Note: Flags indicate national team as defined under FIFA eligibility rules; some limited exceptions apply. Players may hold more than one non-FIFA nationality.

No.	Pos.	Nation	Player
1	GK	IRL	Roy Kelleher
2	DF	IRL	Liam Spillane
3	DF	IRL	Brendan Falvey
4	DF	IRL	Jason Kerins
5	DF	IRL	Padraic Looney
6	MF	IRL	Togor Silong
7	FW	IRL	Victor Udeze
8	MF	IRL	Matt Keane (captain)
9	FW	IRL	Stephen McCarthy
10	FW	CRO	Trpimir Vrljicak
11	MF	IRL	Cianan Cooney

No.	Pos.	Nation	Player
12	DF	IRL	Nattagun Ryan
13	DF	IRL	Obinna Izehi
14	DF	IRL	Cian Doe
15	FW	IRL	Sean Lovett
16	MF	IRL	Caleb Darcy McNamara
17	MF	VEN	Diego Querales
18	MF	IRL	Kennedy Amechi
19	GK	IRL	Kyle Clifford
20	FW	IRL	James McCarrick
—		IRL	Jamie O'Sullivan
—		IRL	Kevin McCarthy

== Honours ==
- Kerry District League Premier A / Premier Division (16): 1981–82, 1985–86, 1995–96, 1996–97, 2005–06, 2006–07, 2009–10, 2010–11, 2012–13, 2017–18, 2018–19, 2019–20, 2021–22, 2022–23, 2023–24, 2024–25, 2025-26
- Kerry District League Greyhound Bar KO Cup: 1977–78, 1984–85, 1995–96, 2002–03, 2005–06, 2009–10, 2015–16, 2017–18, 2018–19, 2019–20, 2021–22, 2022–23, 2023–24
- Kerry District League Cup: 2012–13
- Kerry District League Anchor Shield: 1978–79, 1979–80
- Munster League Champions Trophy: 2011–12
