= FAI National League =

Association football league in the Republic of Ireland

- Founded: 2024
- First season: 2026
- Country: (Republic of Ireland) Ireland
- Number of clubs: 15
- Level on pyramid: 3
- Promotion to: League of Ireland First Division (starting from 2027)
- Domestic cup: FAI Cup
- Current: 2026 FAI National League

The FAI National League is an association football league in the Republic of Ireland, which commenced in August 2026 and effectively operates as a third tier in the Republic of Ireland football league system, below the League of Ireland. It was announced in December 2024 by the Football Association of Ireland (FAI), who invited teams to apply to enter the competition. Intended to consist of 20 teams split into North and South divisions, as of December 2024 the FAI had reportedly received almost 70 applications from interested clubs. The inaugural 2026 league involves 15 clubs.

== History ==
In December 2024, the FAI formally invited clubs to express interest in a new third-tier “National League” due to commence in August 2026, with the aim of bridging the gap between regional amateur football and the League of Ireland First Division. The proposed league is intended to feature promotion to the First Division and relegation into existing provincial competitions, creating a national pyramid for the first time since the A Championship folded in 2011.

The FAI proposed to select 20 clubs, divided into regional North and South divisions, based on criteria such as facilities, governance, and financial stability. Some clubs interested include reserve teams of League of Ireland clubs, established school teams and ambitious non-league sides, some considering joint bids in order to meet the required standards.

On 19 December 2025, the FAI announced that 15 founding clubs would form the new FAI National League, despite expectations that a 20 team line-up would be announced. The league is scheduled to begin with a shortened introductory season in Autumn 2026 and is intended to operate as the top tier of the men’s grassroots game, providing a formal pathway to the League of Ireland. The 15 confirmed clubs were selected following an assessment process that began with 67 expressions of interest and was designed to ensure long-term sustainability and competitiveness. The announced clubs represent all four provinces and ten counties, with five places remaining unfilled. The FAI stated that the league would commence with a truncated inaugural season, with promotion and relegation arrangements to be introduced from the 2027 season. From that point, the winners of the North and South divisions will compete in a play-off final to determine the FAI National League champions. Subject to licensing approval, the champions will then face the bottom-placed club in the League of Ireland First Division in a promotion and relegation play-off. The FAI also stated that a final application window would remain open for clubs seeking to fill the remaining five places, with a deadline of 31 January 2026.

On 20 May 2026, the FAI announced the format for the first season. The first season would include only the 15 clubs that were announced in December 2025, with the FAI reiterating that a 20 team league was still the plan for future seasons. The format would see the 15 clubs split into three groups of five teams. The four best performing teams (the three group winners and the best runner-up) will then enter into a semi-final before a final is played to crown the inaugural National League Champions.

The inaugural 2026 FAI National League competition schedule, which launched in August 2026, included 15 teams.

== Teams ==
=== 2026 clubs ===
On 19 December 2025, the FAI named the 15 clubs included in the schedule for the competition's inaugural year. They included:

- Group 1
  - Bonagee United
  - Cockhill Celtic
  - Home Farm
  - Lucan United
  - Mervue United
- Group 2
  - Letterkenny Rovers
  - Mayo FC
  - Salthill Devon
  - St Francis
  - TU Dublin
- Group 3
  - CK United
  - Killarney Celtic
  - Newbridge Town
  - UCC
  - Villa

=== Stadiums and locations ===
Locations of National League teams
Locations of National League teams in Dublin City

Team	Location	Stadium	Capacity
Bonagee United	Letterkenny	Dry Arch Park	
CK United	Carlow	SETU Sports Campus	
Cockhill Celtic	Buncrana	Charlie O'Donnell Sports Grounds	1,000
Home Farm	Whitehall	Whitehall Stadium	1,800
Killarney Celtic	Killarney	Celtic Park	
Letterkenny Rovers	Letterkenny	Leckview Park	1,000
Lucan United	Lucan	Westmanstown Road	
Mayo FC	Castlebar	Umbro Park	1,500
Mervue United	Galway	Fahy's Field	
Newbridge Town	Newbridge	Station Road	2,180
Salthill Devon	Galway	Drom Soccer Park	2,000
St Francis	Baldonnel	John Hyland Park	
TU Dublin	Blanchardstown	TU Dublin Blanchardstown	
UCC	Mardyke	The Mardyke	800
Villa	Waterford	Connors Park	
