= CK United F.C. =

Soccer club in Kilkenny, Ireland

- Founded: 2017; 9 years ago (as Carlow Kilkenny Football Club)
- Ground: The Watershed, Bohernatounish Rd, Gallowshill, Kilkenny, Ireland
- Chairman: Peter Harvey
- Manager: Tom O'Connor
- League: FAI National League
- Website: ckunited.ie

CK United Football Club is an association football club based in Kilkenny, Ireland. The club was formed in 2017. Since 2026, the club has played in the FAI National League, the third tier of Irish football.

== History ==
Originally called Carlow-Kilkenny Football Club, CK United was formed in 2017 when the Carlow & District Juveniles League and the Kilkenny District League entered a joint under-15 team in the League of Ireland's Under-15 Division. A committee was elected by the two leagues with the Carlow Juveniles chairman, Peter Harvey, elected as chair. Both league organisations saw this as an opportunity for their young players to continue their soccer careers after the Under-14 Kennedy Cup, without having to travel to Dublin to do so.

The under-15 team's first season came in 2018 and the club applied to enter an under-17 team for the following season. In November 2018, the club was accepted into the Southern Elite Division of the Under-17 National League after being awarded a licence for the 2019 season.

The club also entered Under 17 and 19s teams in the Women’s National Leagues.

On 22 November 2022, the club was renamed from 'Carlow-Kilkenny FC' to 'CK United Football Club'. In advance of the 2023 season, CK United entered a League of Ireland academy men's team at under-19 level. They were joined by an under-14 team the same year.

In December 2025, the FAI announced that the club's application to the upcoming National League had been accepted. CK United later purchased Buckley Park to use as their home ground.

== Squad ==
Note: Flags indicate national team as defined under FIFA eligibility rules; some limited exceptions apply. Players may hold more than one non-FIFA nationality.

No.	Pos.	Nation	Player
—	GK	IRL	Darragh O'Neill
—	DF	IRL	Isaac Emmanuel
—	DF	IRL	Owen McCormack
—	DF	CAN	Mamadou Doumbia
—	DF	IRL	Daniel McGrath
—	DF	IRL	Ethan Boyle
—	DF	IRL	Adam Coyne

No.	Pos.	Nation	Player
—	MF	IRL	Liam McDonnell
—	MF	IRL	Jordan Harmon
—	MF	ITA	Lord Afrifa
—	MF	IRL	Dean Denieffe Kelly
—	FW	IRL	Shane Barnes
—	FW	IRL	Emmet Nugent
—	FW	IRL	Timmy Adeleye
