= St Francis F.C. =

Irish association football club

Coordinates: 53°18′10.5″N 6°25′49.8″W

- Full name: Saint Francis Football Club
- Nickname: The Saints
- Founded: 1958
- Ground: John Hyland Park; Baldonnel
- League: FAI National League Leinster Senior League
- Website: www.stfrancisfc1958.ie
Home colours	Away colours

St Francis Football Club is an Irish association football club originally based in The Liberties in Dublin. They play in the FAI National League. They played in the League of Ireland First Division from 1996–97 until 2000–01. They also currently play in the Leinster Senior League and operate a number of schoolboy and women's teams. The club wear green and white hooped shirts.

== History ==
=== Early years ===
St Francis Football Club was founded in the Liberties by John Hyland in 1958. Initially a schoolboy club, the first adult side was introduced in 1968 when St Francis joined the Athletic Union League, winning Division 2A in their first season. In their second season St Francis won the FAI Junior Cup, the highest honour for junior sides. The club progressed into the intermediate ranks and soon become one of the top teams at that grade, winning the Leinster Senior League four times. In 1989–90 St Francis became the first non-League of Ireland side to reach an FAI Cup Final in over 50 years before finally losing to Bray Wanderers. Their fairytale story, combined with the final moving to Lansdowne Road saw a crowd of over 33,000 witness the historic final.

=== League of Ireland years ===
St Francis continued to be one of the top Leinster Senior League sides and, when St. James's Gate pulled out of the League of Ireland First Division ahead of the 1996–97 season, St Francis were invited to take their place. The invite was received a fortnight before the season began and the club's first senior game was a drab drawn tie against Longford Town in the League of Ireland Cup. Their first League of Ireland game ended in a 4–0 defeat to Waterford United on 11 October 1996.

St Francis struggled to make an impact in the League of Ireland First Division. Both their traditional Liberties home and their adopted home of Clondalkin are areas which St Patrick's Athletic claim many fans from, and St Francis's crowds were small, even by First Division standards. In their five seasons in the league, St Francis never finished out of the bottom three. After finishing bottom for the third time in the 2000–01, director Alan Duncan approached St. Patrick's Athletic with a view to merging. St Pats managing director Pat Dolan was receptive to the idea and two weeks before the 2001–02 season, St Francis withdrew from the league. A hurriedly arranged joint press conference was called to announce the arrival of the Dublin Saints after the proposed merger was revealed on a website. St. Pats fans were outraged as their club announced plans to call the club St Patrick's Athletic including St Francis F.C.. In a meeting with St Francis supporters, Duncan spoke of his wish that the new club be officially renamed the Dublin Saints. As the season progressed, the merger talks broke down and the merger never materialised. Pats did use John Hyland Park for some friendlies and for underage games, but the ground was never in their possession as it was held in trust for use by St Francis only.

=== Leinster Senior League ===
St Francis did not field an adult team in 2001–02. However they regrouped and subsequently re-entered the Leinster Senior League.

=== FAI National League ===
In December 2025, St Francis were announced by the Football Association of Ireland as one of the 15 founding member clubs to take part in the inaugural FAI National League season starting in 2026 as the new third tier in the Republic of Ireland football league system.

== Current Squad ==
As of 8 October 2026

Note: Flags indicate national team as defined under FIFA eligibility rules; some limited exceptions apply. Players may hold more than one non-FIFA nationality.

No.	Pos.	Nation	Player
1	GK	IRL	Mark Smith
2	DF	IRL	Evan Farrell
3	DF	IRL	Daragh Ellison
4	DF	IRL	Harry McEvoy
5	DF	IRL	Seamus Curley (captain)
6	MF	IRL	Conor Behan
7	MF	IRL	Rory Garvey
8	MF	IRL	Sean McManus
10	MF	IRL	Jamie Gray
11	FW	IRL	Babtunde Animashaun
12	GK	IRL	Mark Devereux
13	FW	IRL	Darren Williams Oshun

No.	Pos.	Nation	Player
15	DF	IRL	Keelan Walsh
16	DF	IRL	Zach Donohue
17	DF	IRL	Abdulrahman Bouderbala
18	MF	IRL	Luke Scanlon
19	MF	IRL	Dylan Stack
20	GK	IRL	Alfie O'Brien
21	MF	IRL	Janabi Amour Jr.
22	FW	IRL	Jack Savage
23	MF	IRL	Lasha Baramidze
29	FW	IRL	Daniel Hickey
30	FW	MDA	Kevin Croitoru
34	GK	IRL	Colin McCabe

== John Hyland Park ==
St Francis play their home games at John Hyland Park in Baldonnel, close to Clondalkin.

== Honours ==
- Leinster Senior League
  - Winners: 1989–90, 1991–92, 1992–93, 1995–96: 4
- FAI Junior Cup
  - Winners (2): 1968–69, 1982–83
- FAI Cup
  - Runners up: 1989–90
