= Lucan United F.C. =

Association football club in Dublin

Lucan United
- Full name: Lucan United Football Club
- Founded: 1969; 57 years ago
- Ground: Westmanstown Road
- Manager: Darius Kierans
- League: FAI National League
- Website: lucanunitedfc.com
Home colours

Lucan United Football Club are an Irish association football club based in Lucan, Dublin. The club's senior men's team competes in the FAI National League.

Lucan United qualified for the FAI Cup in 2012, 2019 and 2025. The club play their home games at Westmanstown Road, also known as 'Copper Face Jacks Park'.

== History ==
The first Lucan team started in the 1950s and was called Spa Rovers. Spa Rovers were replaced in the 1960s by Lucan Celtic and Dodsboro. In 1968, these two teams decided to merge and became Lucan United in 1969.

In 1999, Intel F.C. merged with Lucan United as most of the Intel players were from Lucan. This increased the number of teams at the club and restored their place in the Leinster Senior League (LSL). By 2002, the club had outgrown their facilities with only one dressing room across all teams, limited space and no toilets or showers. Through the Sports Capital Program, a fundraising campaign and the cooperation of South Dublin County Council Parks Department, Lucan were able to redevelop their grounds.

In the 2011–12 season, the club reached the last 16 of the FAI Intermediate Cup which qualified them for the FAI Senior Cup in 2012. Lucan reached the first round of the competition for the first time, where they lost 4–3 to Phoenix F.C. The club qualified for the FAI Cup again in 2019, beating Killester Donnycarney to make it to the last sixteen where they were knocked out by Crumlin United.

At the end of the 2021–22 season, Lucan were promoted to the top-flight of the Leinster Senior League for the first time. Lucan made it to the semi-finals of the 2022–23 FAI Intermediate Cup, losing 0–2 to eventual winners Rockmount. The club achieved another first when they secured the LSL Metropolitan Cup in May 2023, beating Bluebell United 2–1 at the UCD Bowl. On 29 May 2024, during their second season in the top division, Lucan secured their first Leinster Senior Division title after second-placed St. Mochta's lost to Bangor Celtic. The following season, Lucan qualified for the 2025 FAI Cup, where they were knocked out by Crumlin United in the first round. In December 2025, Lucan United were announced as one of the founding teams in the FAI National League, a new step in the Republic of Ireland football league pyramid. In June 2026, after finishing fourth in the Leinster Senior Division, the club confirmed they would enter separate teams in the Leinster Senior League and FAI National League, with former Drogheda United manager Darius Kierans taking charge of Lucan’s National League side. The club played their first match in the National League when the competition commenced in September 2026.

== Current Squad ==
Note: Flags indicate national team as defined under FIFA eligibility rules; some limited exceptions apply. Players may hold more than one non-FIFA nationality.

No.	Pos.	Nation	Player
1	GK	IRL	Craig Hyland
2	DF	IRL	Adam Deans
3	DF	IRL	Caleb O'Neill
4	DF	IRL	Dylan Hand
5	DF	IRL	Luke Walsh
6	MF	IRL	Mark Byrne
7	MF	IRL	Taylor Mooney
8	DF	IRL	Kobi Ndebumadu
9	FW	IRL	Dean Ebbe
10	MF	IRL	James Doona
11	DF	IRL	Destiny Avenbuan

No.	Pos.	Nation	Player
14	DF	IRL	Adam Nolan
15	DF	IRL	Jonathan Adedeji
16	MF	IRL	Conall Cronin
17	MF	IRL	Josh Stapleton
18	GK	IRL	Edvin Jakas
19	MF	IRL	Sean Quinn (captain)
20	DF	IRL	Martins Olakanye
21	MF	IRL	Reece Weldon
22	FW	IRL	Adrian Mihutescu
23	FW	ROU	Marco Chindea
25	GK	IRL	Nathan Keenan

== Grounds ==
Lucan United have multiple pitches across Dublin and Kildare, using Westmanstown Road for their Leinster Senior League home games. The club also use O'Hanlon Park near Celbridge for training and matches.

== Honours ==
Lucan United F.C. honours
Honour	No.	Years
Leinster Senior League Senior Division	1	2023–24
LSL Metropolitan Cup	1	2022–23
Charlie Cahill Cup	1	2023–24

== Notable former players ==
=== Internationals ===
Republic of Ireland internationals

- (Republic of Ireland) Mark Travers

Republic of Ireland U21 internationals

- (Republic of Ireland) Conor Masterson
- (Republic of Ireland) Cory O'Sullivan

Republic of Ireland amateur internationals

- (Republic of Ireland) Dylan Connolly
