= Bonagee United F.C. =

Bonagee United
- Full name: Bonagee United Football Club
- Short name: Bonagee United
- Founded: November 1970; 55 years ago (as Arcade Athletic)
- Ground: Dry Arch Park
- Capacity: 1,500
- Chairman: Niall Callaghan
- Manager: Michael Funston
- League: FAI National League (2026–present); Donegal Junior League (2023–present)
- 2025–26: 2nd (Donegal Junior League)
- Website: http://www.bonageeunitedfc.webs.com
Home colours

Bonagee United Football Club is an association football club based in Letterkenny, County Donegal. Their senior men's team competes in the third tier of the national system, the FAI National League, and plays their home games at Dry Arch Park. The club also enter a team in the Donegal Junior League's Premier Division and previously competed in the Ulster Senior League.

== History ==
=== Foundation and early years ===
Bonagee United were formed on 2 November 1970 in the Continental Bar, later called Voodoo as of 2006, on Letterkenny's Main Street. The club was founded by a group of men that included Paddy McFadden, Larry Maguire and Eric Funston. In 1971, the club purchased 1 hectare (2.5 acres) of land behind the Dry Arch for £1,000. When they joined the Donegal League, they were originally known as Arcade Athletic. The 'Arcade' part of the name was derived from a café on Letterkenny's main street managed by Paddy McFadden, one of the club's founders.

The Donegal Football League was formed in Letterkenny in 1971 and the first season commenced in March 1972. Arcade Athletic's first official league match was away to Annagry, with the game ending in a 0–6 defeat. Frankie Doherty managed the team in their first season, conducting training in the local boxing club's gym, while Joe Devine finished the season as Arcade's top scorer. In 1973, Arcade Athletic became Bonagee Celtic and then Bonagee United in 1975. The name derives from the Bonagee (Bunnagee, Irish: Bun na Gaoithe) townland to the east of Letterkenny, in which their grounds are located.

=== Lawsuit ===
In October 1993, former Bonagee footballer Dessie Larkin suffered severe burns after coming into contact with lime used to mark the pitch during an FAI Junior Cup match at Drumbar FC in Donegal Town. Thirteen years later, he successfully sued the Football Association of Ireland, arguing that the lack of changing and shower facilities contributed to injuries to his testicles and inner thighs caused by the lime's caustic effects. The judge awarded Larkin €9000, noting that the injuries might have been avoided had he been able "to shower and remove the lime solution", and that the FAI had a duty to warn players to take precautions to prevent such an incident.

=== Later developments ===
Bonagee's first trophy came under Chris Wade in 1995, when they beat Pharmacia 7–0 at Diamond Park in Ballyare to win the Downtown cup. The club began a redevelopment of their grounds in 1998, adding a new playing pitch and a spectator stand. A general purpose hall, two AstroTurf pitches with floodlights, extra dressing rooms, a store and office were also added. From 1998 to 2004, locals raised €973,000 towards the club's facilities, while Bonagee United received a grant of €360,000 with the support of the then Minister for Sport, Jim McDaid.

The club won their first Ulster Senior League (USL) Division One title in 2009. In 2020, Bonagee acquired Old Foundry Park from the O'Donnell family to use as a base for the club’s underage teams.

In 2021–22, Bonagee won the USL League Cup, beating Monaghan United in the final. The club also qualified for the 2022 FAI Cup, beating Pike Rovers 6–0 in the first round. They received a home draw against Shelbourne F.C. in the second round but were knocked out of the competition by the League of Ireland side.

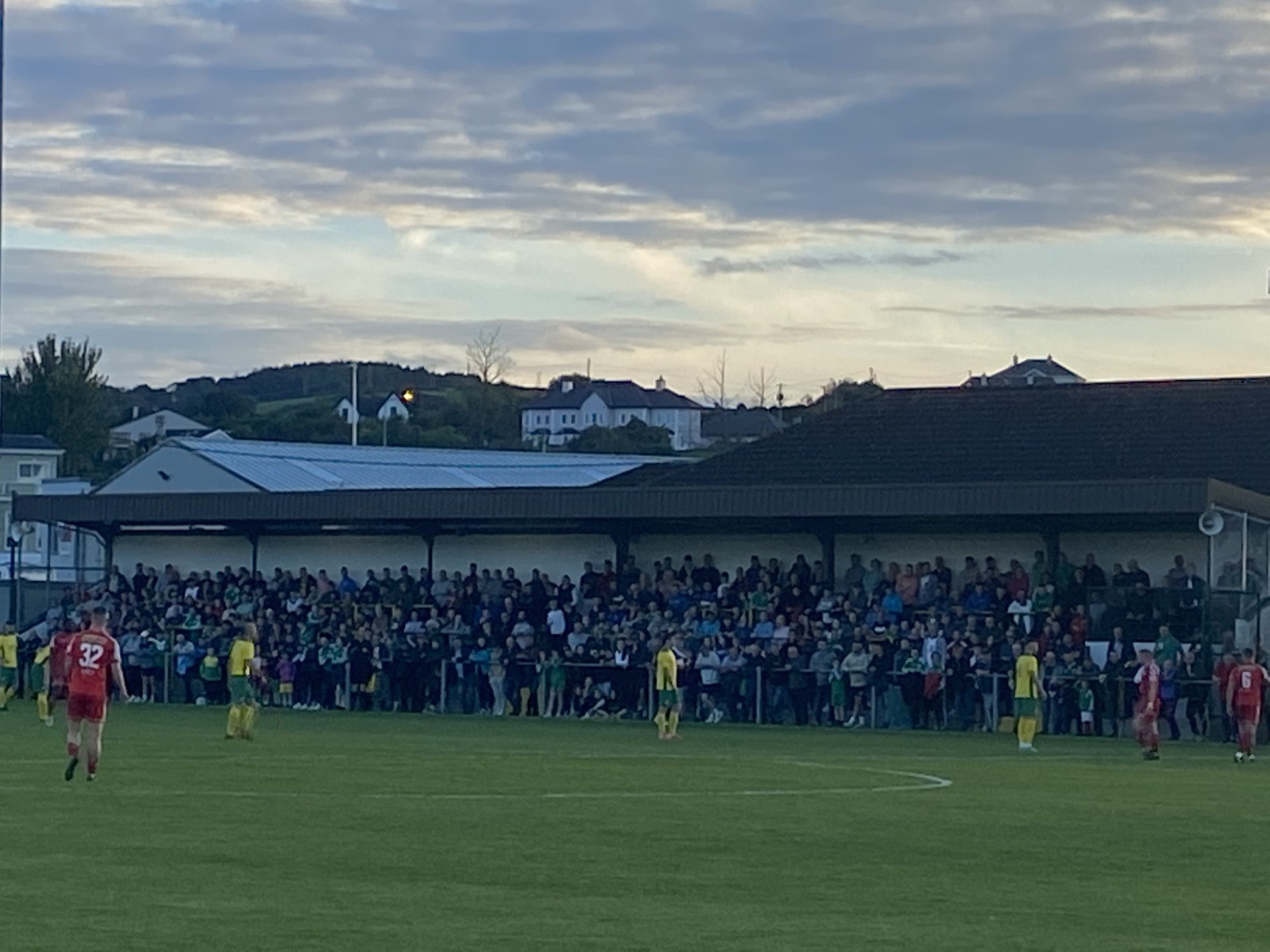
Bonagee United versus Shelbourne FAI Cup match on 26 August 2022

At the end of the 2022–23 season, the Ulster Senior League folded and Bonagee returned to the Donegal Junior League. In their first season back, Bonagee finished second in the league behind fellow Letterkenny club, Letterkenny Rovers. Bonagee mirrored their league position in 2024–25, once again placing second. Former Bonagee player, Michael Funston, was appointed manager in August 2025. In December 2025, Bonagee United were one of the 15 clubs accepted into the FAI National League, a new step in the Republic of Ireland football league pyramid, due to begin in Autumn 2026.

== Ground ==
The club play their home games at Dry Arch Park. The venue has two AstroTurf pitches with floodlights, dressing rooms and a general purpose hall.

On 26 August 2022, Bonagee United hosted League of Ireland Premier Division side Shelbourne at Dry Arch Park in the second round of the FAI Cup, drawing a crowd of 1,500 in a match that ended in a 4–0 victory for the visitors.
