= Mayo FC =

Association football club in Ireland

- Full name: Mayo Football Club
- Founded: 26 June 2023
- Ground: Umbro Park, Castlebar
- Capacity: 1,500
- Coordinates: 53°50′30″N 9°17′13″W
- Owner: Mayo Association Football League
- Chairman: Joe Faughnan
- Manager: Anthony O'Neill
- League: FAI National League
- 2026: 3rd (Group 2)

Mayo Football Club, known simply as Mayo F.C. (stylised as Mayo FC), is an association football club founded in 2023 and based in Castlebar, County Mayo in Ireland. Since 2026, they have competed in the FAI National League, a third division of the Football Association of Ireland's (FAI) League of Ireland.

== History ==
Mayo Football Club was established on 26 June 2023 by representatives of the Mayo Association Football League with the ambition of bringing senior League of Ireland football to County Mayo. The club was officially launched at the Breaffy House Hotel. At the event, the Mayo Football League chairman Séamus Hughes described it as "a momentous occasion" for soccer in the county.

Following the launch, Mayo FC's initial competitive teams were accepted into the League of Ireland's Academy Leagues for the 2024 season. The club fielded boys' Under-14 and Under-15 sides as well as a girls' Under-17 team, marking Mayo's return to the national underage setup for the first time since 2022. These entries were accepted by the National Leagues Committee in 2023, alongside Kerry FC, for participation in the MU14, MU15 and WU17 competitions in the 2024 season. The debut of the Academy Leagues was officially launched at Abbotstown in February 2024.

In March 2025, Mayo FC submitted an expression of interest to join the proposed FAI National League, which is due to be the third tier of the League of Ireland. Mayo FC was one of 67 clubs nationwide to do so in anticipation of a new 20-team structure projected for launch by August 2026. In December 2025, Mayo FC was included on a list of 15 clubs intended to be "founding members" of the FAI National League for its inaugural season in 2026.

In April 2026, Mayo appointed Anthony O'Neill, who previously managed the club's under-20 team, as manager of their senior men's team. On 11 May 2026, Mayo FC announced the signing of Ben Edeh, which was their first ever senior signing.

== Grounds ==
The club is based at Umbro Park in Milebush, Castlebar. Umbro Park has a FIFA-standard 4G artificial surface, a modest covered stand, floodlighting and a clubhouse with dressing rooms and referee facilities. Maintenance and pitch quality are overseen by the Mayo Football League, with regular upkeep and inspections. The venue is close to Castlebar town centre.

== Players ==
Note: Flags indicate national team as defined under FIFA eligibility rules; some limited exceptions apply. Players may hold more than one non-FIFA nationality. Squad correct as of 20 October 2026.

No.	Pos.	Nation	Player
1	GK	IRL	Matthew Fox
4	MF	IRL	Gary Armstrong
5	DF	IRL	Daire O'Connor
6	DF	IRL	Noe Baba (captain)
7	FW	IRL	Ben Edeh
8	MF	IRL	Sean McAteer
9	FW	ENG	Connor McCarthy
10	MF	IRL	James McGrath
12	FW	IRL	Daithi Gannon
13	DF	IRL	Daniel Lynch
14	FW	IRL	Darragh Forde
15	MF	GEO	Daviti Tsikarishvili

No.	Pos.	Nation	Player
16	GK	IRL	Micheál Schlingermann
17	FW	VEN	Alfonso Barrios
18	DF	IRL	Zack Stone
19	FW	IRL	Jayden Reynolds
20	FW	IRL	Aiden Dunleavy
22	MF	IRL	Padraig Heinz-Ward
23	MF	GEO	Guga Kokaia
24	MF	IRL	Aron Heaney
25	GK	IRL	Arron Boyle
27	DF	IRL	Oisín O'Reilly
28	MF	IRL	Aidan Coyle

== Technical staff ==
Position	Staff
Manager	Anthony O'Neill
Assistant manager	Micheál Schlingermann
Goalkeeping coach	Micheál Schlingermann

== Crest and colours ==
Mayo FC's primary colours are green and red, mirroring Mayo GAA's colours. The Mayo FC crest features a cross at the top right that represents Croagh Patrick, while a winding path on the left symbolises the club's "challenging journey ahead". At the bottom, the bow of a boat references Gráinne Mhaol (Grace O'Malley), representing both local heritage and Mayo FC's commitment to women's football. Nine lines across the bow stand for the nine historic baronies of County Mayo; Erris, Burrishoole, Carra, Costello, Clanmorris, Gallen, Kilmaine, Murrisk and Tirawley.
