= Whitehall Stadium =

Football stadium in Dublin, Ireland

Coordinates: 53°22′38.49″N 6°15′06.05″W

- Staid Fhionnbhrú
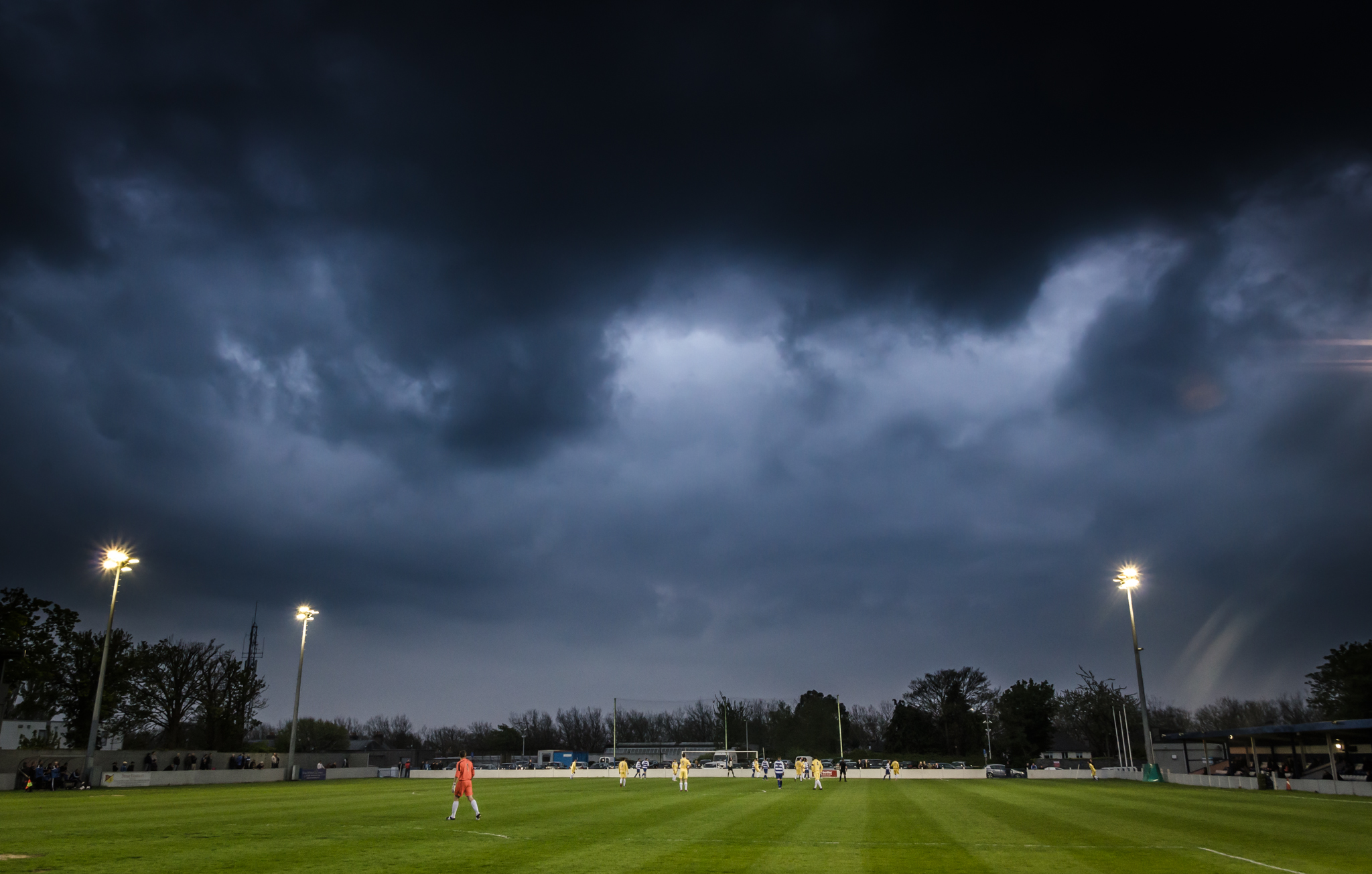
- Interactive map of Whitehall Stadium
- Full name: Whitehall Stadium
- Location: Drumcondra Road Upper, Whitehall, Dublin, Ireland
- Capacity: 1,800
- Public transit: Whitehall (Garda Station) bus stop (Dublin Bus route 1, 13, 16, 33, 41, 44, 101); Drumcondra railway station (1.6 km / 1 mile walk)

Construction
- Built: 1980
- Opened: 1984

Tenants
- Home Farm F.C. (1989–present); Dublin City F.C. (2003, 2005–2006); Drumcondra F.C. (2006–present)

Whitehall Stadium is an Irish association football ground located in the North Dublin suburb of Whitehall, bordering Drumcondra. It is the home ground of association football club Home Farm. Home Farm moved to the ground in 1989 when Shelbourne acquired the lease on their former home, Tolka Park.

The stadium was also the home of former League of Ireland club Dublin City F.C. in 2003 and again from September 2005.

The stadium has hosted numerous underage international games including matches at the 1994 UEFA European Under-16 Football Championship.

Whitehall was selected as a venue for the 2019 UEFA European Under-17 Championship. The venue hosted three group-stage matches. In October 2025, the stadium hosted a Republic of Ireland amateur international football team game.

== See also ==
- List of association football venues in the Republic of Ireland
