= Dry Arch Park =

Soccer venue in Ireland

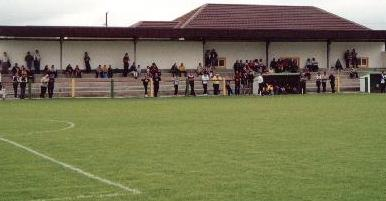
- Interactive map of Dry Arch Park
- Location: Letterkenny, County Donegal, Ireland
- Coordinates: 54°56′42″N 7°41′49″W
- Owner: Bonagee United F.C.
- Surface: Grass
- Field size: 105 m x 68 m

Tenant
- Bonagee United F.C.

Dry Arch Park is the home ground of Bonagee United, an Irish association football team. It is located close to central Letterkenny in County Donegal.

The ground was bought in 1971 by the founders of Bonagee United, who purchased 2.5 acres of land behind the Dry Arch pub for £1,000. The ground takes its name from a railway bridge "The Dry Arch" which was situated about 1 km from the pitch. The bridge was knocked down on construction of the dual carriageway in the early 1990s. The Dry Arch Bar, which is situated directly beside the pitch, is also named after the bridge.

The current grounds include a spectator stand, multipurpose hall, meeting rooms, 5-a-side artificial pitch, 6-a-side artificial pitch, 3 changing rooms and separate shower and changing facilities for referees. In 1998, the club received grant aid to develop a general purpose hall, two artificial turf pitches and a spectator stand. In November 2016, the ground had six 500 lux floodlights installed. The ground's first Ulster Senior League game under floodlights came against Cockhill Celtic on 13 November 2016.

The development was supported by government grants as well as by the local people.

In August 2022, the ground hosted the FAI Cup second round match between Bonagee United and Shelbourne.
