= Letterkenny Rovers F.C. =

Letterkenny Rovers
- Full name: Letterkenny Rovers Football Club
- Short name: Rovers
- Founded: 1936; 90 years ago (as Letterkenny Crusaders)
- Ground: Leckview Park
- Chairman: Eamon McConigley
- Manager: Stephen McConnell
- League: FAI National League (2026–present); Donegal League Premier Division (2023–present)
- 2025–26: 1st (Donegal League Premier Division)
- Website: www.letterkennyroversfc.ie
Home colours	Away colours

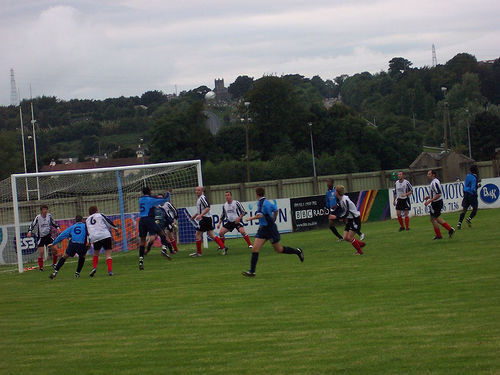
Letterkenny Rovers in action

Letterkenny Rovers Football Club (Irish: An Cumann Peile Leitir Ceanainn) is an Irish association football club based in Letterkenny, County Donegal. Their senior men's team competes in the FAI National League, and in the Donegal Junior League's Premier Division, and plays their home games at Leckview Park.

The club won a historic treble in the 2024–25 season, winning the Donegal League Premier Division, the Brian McCormick Sports Cup, and Ulster Cup without a single defeat.

== History ==
The club was formed in 1936 as Letterkenny Crusaders before being given its current name in 1954. Sources differ on the exact date with May 1957 and 1962 also cited as formation years. However, the official club website states that the club was renamed Letterkenny Rovers in 1962.

The club won back-to-back Donegal League titles in the 1980–81 and 1981–82 seasons before going on to become one of the founding members of the Ulster Senior League (USL) in 1986.

Rovers won the USL on two occasions, with their first title coming in the 2004–05 season under manager Danny McConnell. In 2006, the club entered a team in the national under-21 league. At the end of 2006, the club began preparation for an application for a semi-professional license to compete in the new A Championship but the Championship was cancelled at the end of the 2011 season. However, in 2010, the club erected a new 200 seater stand at Leckview Park in phase one of the re-development of the venue.

The 2015–2016 season saw Rovers, under the guidance of manager Eamon McConigley, achieve two notable firsts. Despite losing out to Cockhill Celtic for the USL and the Ulster Senior Cup (known as the Knockalla Caravans Cup for sponsorship reasons), Letterkenny Rovers reached the final of the FAI Intermediate Cup for the first time. Although Rovers would lose the final at the Aviva Stadium, going down 5–0 to Crumlin United, the club reached the second round of the FAI Cup for the first time, beating Portmarnock 2–1 at Leckview Park.

The 2021/22 season saw Rovers win the Donegal League Division Two at the first attempt upon its re-entry to the Donegal Junior League under the guidance of Stephen McConnell. The club also launched their FAI Football for All programme in 2022 to grant sporting opportunities to players with a disability.

Following the disbandment of the Ulster Senior League (USL) at the end of the 2022–23 season, the club’s senior men's team returned to junior football. Letterkenny Rovers were the only club to have participated in every season of the USL. In their first season back in the Donegal Junior League, Rovers won the 2023–24 Donegal League First Division and the Brian McCormick Sports Cup. The club went one better in the 2024–25 season, achieving a treble by winning the Donegal Junior League Premier Division, the Brian McCormick Sports Cup, and Ulster Junior Cup without a single defeat. More success came Rovers' way in the 2025-26 season with the club winning back to back Donegal League Premier Division titles and the Brian McCormick Sports Cup. The league win was dramatic with the team needing a win away to Keadue Rovers, 1-0 behind going into injury time, goals from Lee McMonagle and BJ Banda ensured a dramatic victory clinching the league title.

In December 2025, Letterkenny Rovers were announced as a founding team of the FAI National League, a new step in the Republic of Ireland football league pyramid. The club are expected to compete in the truncated season of the league, beginning in Autumn 2026. In 2025–26, Letterkenny won the Donegal League and Cup double.

== Current squad ==
As of September 2026

Note: Flags indicate national team as defined under FIFA eligibility rules; some limited exceptions apply. Players may hold more than one non-FIFA nationality.

No.	Pos.	Nation	Player
1	GK	IRL	Patrick McGarvey
2	DF	IRL	Padraic Gilsenan
3	DF	IRL	Brendan McCafferty
4	DF	IRL	Dean McCarry
5	DF	IRL	Keith Cowan
6	MF	IRL	David Shovlin
7	MF	IRL	Adrian Delap
8	MF	IRL	Adam McCaffrey
9	FW	IRL	Ronan McHugh
10	FW	IRL	Shane McNamee
11	MF	IRL	Zach Gorman

No.	Pos.	Nation	Player
12	DF	IRL	Gareth Doherty
13	DF	IRL	Rory Gallagher
15	DF	IRL	Ryan Shields
15	FW	IRL	Zach Gorman
16	FW	IRL	Luke Parke
17	FW	IRL	Simon McGlynn
18	MF	IRL	Cathal McGeever
19	MF	IRL	Ultan O'Grady
21	MF	IRL	Jamie Harris
22	GK	IRL	Blake Forkan

== Club officials ==
As of 3 May 2025

Position	Name
Manager	(Republic of Ireland) Stephen McConnell
Assistant Manager/Coach	(Republic of Ireland) Anthony Gorman

== Management ==
Managers

- (Republic of Ireland) Stephen McConnell (2021 - date)
- (Republic of Ireland) Danny McConnell (Aug 2020 - 2023)
- (Republic of Ireland) Eamonn McConigley (2007 - Aug 2020)
- (Republic of Ireland) Danny McConnell (2003 - 2007)

Assistant Managers

- (Republic of Ireland) Anthony Gorman (2023 - date)

== Colours and badge ==
Letterkenny Rovers home kit is white jersey, black shorts, black socks. The away kit are black jerseys, black shorts and black socks.

Letterkenny Rovers crest until 2026

The club crest is divided into four panels which feature (clockwise from top left) St Eunan's Cathedral, the Oldtown bridge that crosses the River Swilly, Conwal Parish Church, and a salmon, which is a common symbol associated with the town. There is a football in the centre of the crest.

== Honours ==
- Ulster Senior League
  - Winners: 2004–05, 2009: 2
- Ulster Senior League Cup
  - Winners: 1991–92, 2001–02, 2003–04, 2012, 2018–19: 5
- FAI Intermediate Cup
  - Runners-up: 2015–16: 1
