= Leckview Park =

Soccer venue in Donegal, Ireland

- Lecky
- Interactive map of Leckview Park
- Address: Leckview Lane
- Location: Letterkenny, Ireland; F92 CR20
- Coordinates: 54°56′38″N 7°44′00″W
- Owner: Letterkenny Rovers F.C.
- Capacity: 1,000 (200 seated)
- Surface: Grass
- Field size: 105 m x 68 m

Construction
- Opened: 1967

Tenant
- Letterkenny Rovers F.C.

Leckview Park (Irish: Páirc Radharc Leac) is a football stadium in County Donegal, Ireland. Located on Leckview Lane, by the banks of the River Swilly in Letterkenny, it is the home ground of Letterkenny Rovers. It is also close to the county's largest multi-screen cinema complex at Leckview Lane on Letterkenny's Pearse Road.

The stadium's name refers to Conwal and Leck in which it is located, and the stadium can be easily viewed through the trees from the similarly named cemetery across the river.

The club purchased land in the Isles from the Crumlish family for 500 pounds in the early 1960s. Sources differ on the exact date the ground was officially opened, with 1965 and 1967 both cited as the commemorative year. However, the official club website states that the grounds were opened in 1967.

The first match played at Leckview Park was a friendly against Coleraine, managed at the time by Bertie Peacock. The stand was opened in August 2011 and seats 200. In 2016, the ground hosted an FAI Cup second round match between Letterkenny Rovers and Athlone Town. In May 2022, a new artificial turf pitch costing €500,000 was opened, replacing the club's old practice pitch.

The ground has also hosted other games in the community, such as the Adult Disability Services Football for All blitz. In July 2024, the pitch hosted 1,000 spectators for a Manchester United Legends match against Letterkenny Rovers.
