= Institute of Technology, Blanchardstown =

Former third-level college, amalgamated into Technological University Dublin

Coordinates: 53.405702°N 6.378074°W

- Institiúid Teicneolaíochta, Baile Bhlainséir
- Type: Institute of Technology
- Active: 1999–2019
- President: Dr. Diarmuid O’Callaghan
- Chairperson of Governing Body: Professor Tom Collins
- Administrative staff: 200
- Students: 5000
- Address: Blanchardstown Road North, Dublin 15, Blanchardstown, Dublin, Ireland
- Website: http://www.itb.ie

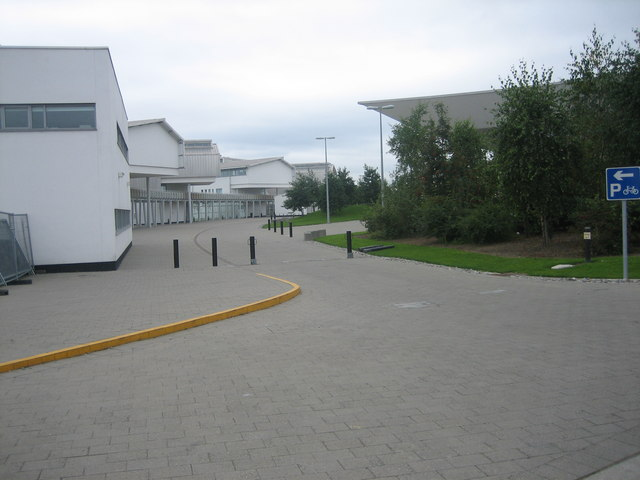
Institute of Technology, Blanchardstown

Institute of Technology, Blanchardstown (ITB) (Irish: Institiúid Teicneolaíochta Baile Bhlainséir) established in 1999, was a third-level institution outside Dublin. In 2019, it merged with the Dublin Institute of Technology (DIT) and the Institute of Technology Tallaght (ITT) to form the new Technological University Dublin (TU Dublin).

It was the last-founded Institute of Technology in Ireland. The campus is located within the Business and Technology Park on Blanchardstown Road North, about 15 km from Dublin City and close to the N3 (Navan Road). This is situated in the townland of Buzzardstown, in the civil parish of Mulhuddart.

ITB provided full-time and part-time higher education courses in a range of subjects, making awards at levels from higher certificate, to PhD.

== Historic statutes and governance ==
=== Statutory basis ===
The Regional Technical Colleges (Amendment) Act 1999 was enacted by the Oireachtas in July 1999, putting the Institute of Technology Blanchardstown on the same statutory footing as the twelve other Institutes of Technologies in Ireland already operating under the Regional Technical Colleges Acts 1992 and 1994. The institute also operated under the Qualifications (Education and Training) Act, 1999 and the Institutes of Technology Act 2006.

=== Governance ===
The institute was overseen by a statutory Governing Body, appointed by the Minister for Education and Science, with representation from the college community, broader local community, business interests and the State. Academic affairs and standards were controlled by the Academic Council.

=== Delegated Authority ===
ITB achieved delegated authority in 2006 and had the authority to award qualifications (on behalf of HETAC)) to those completing courses up to Level 9 of the National Framework of Qualifications (NFQ).

=== Management ===
Management of the institute was led by the President (previously Director), who leads a management team also comprising the Registrar, Secretary and Financial Controller, and Heads of Schools, Departments and other functions (such as the Estates Manager, IT Manager, HR Manager).

== Academic structure and courses ==
=== Schools and Departments of the Institute ===
- School of Business & Humanities
  - Department of Business
  - Department of Humanities
- School of Informatics & Engineering
  - Department of Computing and Creative Digital Media
  - Department of Engineering

=== Courses ===
Full-time and part-time courses were, and are within TUD, offered in Applied Social Studies, Business, Computing, Digital Media, Engineering, Horticulture, Languages, Social and Community Development, Sports Management and Early Childhood Care & Education, with awards made at higher certificate, ordinary degree, honours degree, Master's Degree and PhD (doctoral research) levels.

=== Research ===
The research community at ITB was, and remains within TUD, involved with research and collaboration projects with industry, community organisations and different agencies in the locality. Some of these include National Road Authority, IBM, Intel, Havoc, Wavebob, ESB, Health Service Executive, SMEs on the Innovation Voucher Scheme. As part of ITB's strategic plan 2006-2011 "Making Education Accessible" ITB established itself as a member of the research community within the third level sector in Ireland. The LINC Centre (Learning and Innovation Centre) is the centre which supports the research activities taking place in the Institute supporting technology transfer activities, applied research links with industry and links to the funding agencies for the research activities in the institute.

== Campus ==
The college had a 22 hectares (54 acres) campus within Fingal County Council's College Business and Technology Park on Blanchardstown Road North, now designated TUD Blanchardstown Campus. The component buildings, with a total area of over 22,000 square metres, and capital cost exceeding €50 million, are:

- A Block: ITB's first building, opened September 1999, contains computing and engineering laboratories, three large lecture theatres and offices for Academic Administration, Finance and Human Resources. It also has the counsellor's office.
- Learning and Innovation Centre (LINC Building / B Block): Built May–October 2001, initially for workshops, and now hosting small business ventures and supporting college-industry links, as well as post-graduate research facilities.
- Multipurpose Building (C Block): Canteen, medical centre, Students' Union, chaplains' offices, sports hall and gym.
- D Block: Apprentice workshops, including electrical, masonry, carpentry and plumbing, as well as maintenance and goods receiving.
- E Block: A two-wing building containing classrooms, science laboratories, language laboratories, two large lecture theatres, most academic staff offices and the student helpdesk.
- F Block: Main entry point, holding the reception, marketing and management offices, and the largest lecture theatre.
- Library: With books primarily related to course work, DVDs and videos, and access to online information in the form of scientific journals, newspapers and databases.

== Student life ==
=== Sports ===
The first sporting club was founded in ITB in 1999. Sports clubs in ITB include Gaelic games, soccer, futsal, pool, basketball, swimming, athletics, martial arts, rugby, badminton, boxing, golf, ski and Olympic handball. Many of these clubs compete at the inter varsity level and have won numerous awards.

ITB offers sports scholarships to full-time students to assist them in reaching their potential, both academically and in their chosen sport. In association with the Leinster GAA there are also a limited number of bursaries awarded to "outstanding" GAA players from Leinster who are registered students of ITB.

=== Societies ===
ITB also has a number of societies, including an Ethical Hacker Society, Golf Society, Poker and Music Societies.

=== Students Union ===
The Students Union ITBSU has four student board members, elected every year. Every student who registers at the institute is automatically a member, with a portion of their registration fee going to the upkeep of the Union. In return every student gets a vote in a first past the post system. The Student Union office is located upstairs in the C Block, beside the Common Room. It runs seminars on Student health issues, college outings, information campaigns, and oversees the management of student clubs and societies.

== See also ==
- Education in the Republic of Ireland
- Third-level education in the Republic of Ireland
