= Drom Soccer Park =

Soccer venue in Ireland

- NFP Park
- Interactive map of Drom Soccer Park
- Location: Drom East; Rahoon; County Galway; Ireland
- Coordinates: 53.29318°N 9.133338°W
- Operator: Salthill Devon F.C.
- Capacity: 2,000
- Public transit: Clybaun Road bus stop

Construction
- Opened: 2002

Tenant
- Salthill Devon F.C.

Drom Soccer Park currently known as NFP Park for sponsorship reasons, is an association football venue in the Republic of Ireland based in Drom East, Rahoon, County Galway. It is the home ground of Salthill Devon F.C. It was built in 2002 and has a capacity of 2,000. Drom also hosts the Galway Cup annually.

The facility opened with four grass pitches, eight Astroturf cages and a mini all-weather pitch.
