= Jake Walker (Irish footballer) =

Irish footballer (born 2000)

Personal information
- Date of birth: 19 August 2000 (age 26)
- Place of birth: Clondalkin, Dublin, Ireland
- Position: Striker

Team information
- Current team: Crumlin United

Youth career
- 2017–2019: St Patrick's Athletic

Senior career*
Years	Team	Apps	(Gls)
2017–2020	St Patrick's Athletic	23	(1)
2020–2022	Crumlin United		
2023	Bray Wanderers	22	(2)
2024–	Crumlin United		
- * Club domestic league appearances and goals as of 30 August 2024

Jake Walker (born 19 August 2000) is an Irish footballer who plays for Crumlin United, having previously played for St Patrick's Athletic and Bray Wanderers.

== Club career ==
=== Early career ===
Walker signed for the St Patrick's Athletic Under-17 side in January 2017. He played in the same Under 19s team as fellow future first team players including Brian Maher, Joe Manley, Paul Clearly and Luke McNally. In 2018, his side got to the Enda McGuill Cup final, unfortunately losing out 2–1 to Bohemians at Richmond Park on 4 September.

=== St Patrick's Athletic ===
Walker made his debut for the St Patrick's Athletic first team on 8 August 2017 when he came off the bench for Josh O'Hanlon for the last 2 minutes of a 2–1 Leinster Senior Cup win over Firhouse Clover at Richmond Park. He did not feature in the 2018 season with forward options including Christy Fagan, Jake Keegan and Achille Campion at the dispense of manager Liam Buckley. His next involvement with the first team came on 18 February 2019 when he came off the bench for the injured Gary Shaw in a 3–0 Leinster Senior Cup win over Wexford, with Walker heading home a James Doona cross after 58 minutes to put his side 2 goals in front. That performance impressed manager Harry Kenny enough to promote him from the Under-19s team to the first team squad for the season 3 days later, on 21 February. His League of Ireland debut came on 5 April 2019, coming on for Gary Shaw in injury time of a 1–0 win at home to champions Dundalk. His first professional contract came when he signed a 2-year contract with the club on 11 April 2019. Walker made 10 more substitute appearances in a row before coming off the bench and scoring the winner against Finn Harps on 14 June with 7 minutes to go, the first league goal of his senior career. This performance earned Walker a place in the starting 11 as he started the next 3 games, away to UCD, at home to Shamrock Rovers in the Dublin derby and an important win away to Waterford. His first appearance in Europe came on 11 July 2019 as he came off the bench against IFK Norrköping of Sweden, as Pats lost 2–0 at Richmond Park. On 22 October 2019 Walker came off the bench away to Derry City in the 69th minute with the scores level and brilliantly set up two goals for fellow substitute James Doona to secure a 3–1 win for the Saints at the Ryan McBride Brandywell Stadium. Walker scored the third goal in a 4–0 win over Athlone Town in the 2019 Leinster Senior Cup Final on 16 November 2019, claiming the first silverware of his senior career. After making 1 appearance in the 2020 season before the league was postponed due to the Coronavirus pandemic, it was announced on the 3rd August 2020 that Walker had left the club.

=== Crumlin United ===
After leaving Pat's, Walker played for Leinster Senior League side Crumlin United from 2020 to 2022 where he excelled to the extent that he was the league's top goalscorer during his time there.

=== Bray Wanderers ===
On 12 December 2022, it was announced that Walker had signed for League of Ireland First Division club Bray Wanderers ahead of their 2023 season.

== Personal life ==
In December 2023, Walker was charged by Garda Síochána with unlawful possession of €1,000 worth of Cocaine and having it for sale or supply in Clondalkin.

== Career statistics ==
Professional appearances – correct as of 30 August 2024.

Appearances and goals by club, season and competition
Club	Season	League			National Cup		League Cup		Europe		Other		Total	
Club	Season	Division	Apps	Goals	Apps	Goals	Apps	Goals	Apps	Goals	Apps	Goals	Apps	Goals
St Patrick's Athletic	2017	League of Ireland Premier Division	0	0	0	0	0	0	—		1 (Note: Appearances in Leinster Senior Cup)	0	1	0
St Patrick's Athletic	2018	League of Ireland Premier Division	0	0	0	0	0	0	—		0	0	0	0
St Patrick's Athletic	2019	League of Ireland Premier Division	22	1	1	0	0	0	1 (Note: Appearances in UEFA Europa League)	0	4	2	28	3
St Patrick's Athletic	2020	League of Ireland Premier Division	1	0	0	0	—		—		—		1	0
St Patrick's Athletic	Total		23	1	1	0	0	0	1	0	5	2	30	3
Bray Wanderers	2023	League of Ireland First Division	22	2	1	0	—		—		0	0	23	2
Career Total			55	3	2	0	0	0	1	0	5	2	53	5

== Honours ==
- Leinster Senior Cup: (1)
  - St Patrick's Athletic — 2019
