= Cian Coleman =

Irish footballer (born 1997)

Personal information
- Date of birth: 1 January 1997 (age 29)
- Place of birth: Cork, Ireland
- Positions: Midfielder; defender

Team information
- Current team: Cobh Ramblers
- Number: 14

Youth career
- 2013–2016: Cork City

Senior career*
Years	Team	Apps	(Gls)
2015–2016	Cork City	3	(0)
2017	Cobh Ramblers	23	(4)
2018	Limerick	30	(2)
2019	St Patrick's Athletic	19	(0)
2020–2024	Cork City	130	(10)
2025–	Cobh Ramblers	48	(3)
- * Club domestic league appearances and goals as of 11:34, 9 January 2025 (UTC)

Cian Coleman (born 1 January 1997) is an Irish professional footballer that plays for League of Ireland First Division club Cobh Ramblers. His previous clubs are Cork City (over 2 spells), Limerick and St Patrick's Athletic.

== Club career ==
=== Cork City ===
Coleman joined Cork City in 2013 aged 16, just after having spent time on trial with Aston Villa. He played for the clubs' under 19 side for four seasons alongside the likes of Chiedozie Ogbene, Aaron Drinan and Conor McCarthy among others. His first season saw Cork win the league, the third year in a row for the side. in 2015, they retained their title with a win over Limerick at Markets Field. Coleman made his first appearance for the senior team aged 18 on 31 August 2015 as he came on as a substitute for Kevin O'Connor in a 3–1 win over St Patrick's Athletic at Turners Cross. 2016 saw Coleman make 2 further appearances for the first team, in games against Wexford and Bray Wanderers. He captained the under 19 side to the Enda McGuill Cup, beating St Patrick's Athletic in the final and qualifying for the UEFA Youth League in the process. Coleman impressed in the UEFA Youth League, as he captained the side to a 1–0 win on aggregate against HJK Helsinki of Finland before losing 3–1 at home and 1–0 away to Italian giants AS Roma.

=== Cobh Ramblers ===
With Coleman facing an uphill battle for playing time in the first team at Cork City with midfield options of Gearoid Morrissey, Greg Bolger, Garry Buckley, Conor McCormack and Jimmy Keohane, Coleman opted to join Cobh Ramblers in the League of Ireland First Division in March 2017. Coleman's first senior career goal came on 18 March 2017 in a 5–1 win over Athlone Town at St Colman's Park. His first season in senior football under Stephen Henderson saw Coleman rack up as many as 27 appearances in all competitions, scoring 4 goals.

=== Limerick ===
Coleman made the step back up to the League of Ireland Premier Division when he signed for Limerick on 7 November 2017. Upon signing for Limerick, Coleman stated that manager Neil McDonald played a huge part in his decision to sign for the club. The season turned out to be a disaster for the club however, as McDonald departed in January before the season started, replaced by Tommy Barrett. The club struggled with financial difficulties which resulted in players leaving in the summer transfer window and ultimately saw the in a relegation fight for the entire season. Coleman however impressed with his performances throughout the season. He amassed 35 appearances and 2 goals across all competitions in his first season at Premier Division level which included playing both legs of the Promotion/relegation playoffs, which saw Limerick beaten by Finn Harps, resulting in relegation for the blues.

=== St Patrick's Athletic ===
On 27 November 2018, Coleman signed for Dublin club St Patrick's Athletic for the 2019 season. He made his debut on the opening night of the season on 15 February 2019 in a 1–0 win over his former side Cork City at Richmond Park. Coleman had to wait until 31 May for his first start in the league, also against Cork City, in which he set up Simon Madden's 95th-minute equaliser in a 1–1 draw. This performance helped Coleman claim his place in Harry Kenny's starting 11 over the next number of games, just before Pats' UEFA Europa League campaign. Coleman got his first taste of European football at senior level as he played both legs of the tie as Pats were knocked out of the UEFA Europa League at the first hurdle by IFK Norrköping of Sweden, losing 2–0 at home and 2–1 away. He was released at the end of the season after making 26 appearances in all competitions, failing to score a goal in his time with the club.

=== Return to Cork City ===
On 7 November 2019, it was announced that Coleman had returned to his hometown club Cork City ahead of the 2020 season. On 17 December 2024, Coleman revealed that the club had opted not to renew his contract, following their promotion back to the League of Ireland Premier Division.

=== Return to Cobh Ramblers ===
After 5 seasons with Cork City, Coleman returned to Cobh Ramblers on 14 January 2025. On 19 May 2025, he was part of the side that won the Munster Senior Cup following a 2–0 win over Rockmount at Turners Cross.

== Career statistics ==
As of match played on 28 October 2026

Club	Division	Season	League		Cup		League Cup		Europe		Other		Total	
Club	Division	Season	Apps	Goals	Apps	Goals	Apps	Goals	Apps	Goals	Apps	Goals	Apps	Goals
Cork City	LOI Premier Division	2015	1	0	0	0	0	0	0	0	0	0	1	0
Cork City	LOI Premier Division	2016	2	0	0	0	0	0	0	0	0	0	2	0
Cork City	Total		3	0	0	0	0	0	0	0	0	0	3	0
Cobh Ramblers	LOI First Division	2017	23	4	1	0	2	0	—		1 (Note: Appearances in Munster Senior Cup)	0	27	4
Limerick	LOI Premier Division	2018	30	2	3	0	0	0	—		2 (Note: Appearances in League of Ireland promotion/relegation playoffs)	0	35	2
St Patrick's Athletic	LOI Premier Division	2019	19	0	2	0	1	0	2 (Note: Appearances in UEFA Europa League)	0	2 (Note: Appearances in Leinster Senior Cup)	0	26	0
Cork City	LOI Premier Division	2020	14	0	2	0	—		—		0	0	16	0
Cork City	LOI First Division	2021	26	3	2	0	—		—		—		28	3
Cork City	LOI First Division	2022	27	2	2	0	—		—		0	0	29	2
Cork City	LOI Premier Division	2023	31	0	4	1	—		—		2 (Note: 1 appearance in the Munster Senior Cup & 1 appearance, 1 goal the 2023 League of Ireland Premier Division Play-off)	1	37	2
Cork City	LOI First Division	2024	32	5	2	0	—		—		0	0	34	5
Cork City	Total		130	10	12	1	—		—		1	0	144	12
Cobh Ramblers	LOI First Division	2025	33	2	1	0	—		—		4 (Note: 2 appearances in the Munster Senior Cup; 2 appearances in the 2025 League of Ireland play-offs)	0	38	2
Cobh Ramblers	LOI First Division	2026	0	0	0	0	—		—		0	0	0	0
Cobh Ramblers	Total		33	2	1	0	—		—		4	0	38	2
Career Total			264	18	19	1	3	0	2	0	10	0	299	20

== Honours ==
Cork City

- League of Ireland First Division (2): 2022, 2024
- FAI Cup (1): 2016
- President of Ireland's Cup (1): 2016

St Patrick's Athletic

- Leinster Senior Cup (1): 2018–19

Cobh Ramblers

- Munster Senior Cup (1): 2024–25
