= Brendan Clarke =

Irish footballer (born 1985)

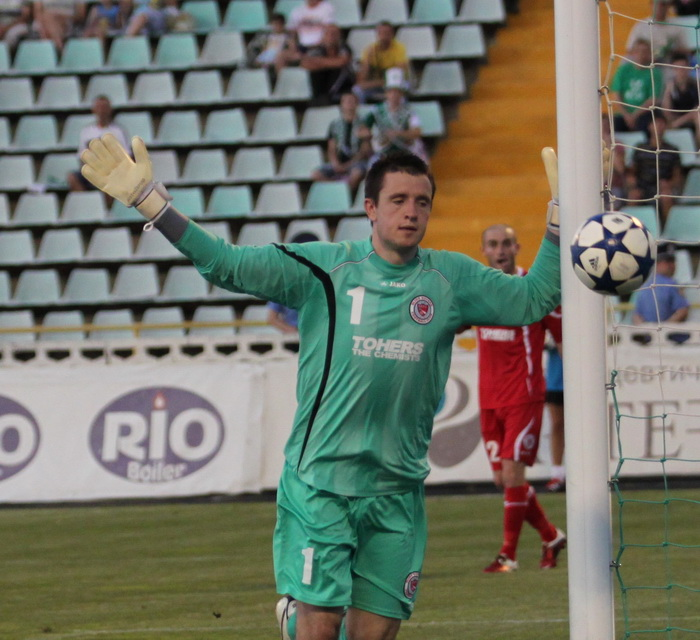
- Clarke playing for Sligo Rovers in 2011

Personal information
- Date of birth: 17 September 1985 (age 41)
- Place of birth: Dublin, Ireland
- Height: 1.86 m (6 ft 1 in)
- Position: Goalkeeper

Youth career
- C.I.E. Ranch
- Cherry Orchard

Senior career*
Years	Team	Apps	(Gls)
2003–2009	St Patrick's Athletic	29	(0)
2008	→ Sporting Fingal (loan)	14	(0)
2010	Sporting Fingal	17	(0)
2011	Sligo Rovers	31	(0)
2012–2016	St Patrick's Athletic	128	(0)
2017–2018	Limerick	50	(0)
2018–2020	St Patrick's Athletic	64	(1)
2021–2022	Shelbourne	54	(0)
2023–2025	Galway United	92	(0)
2026	Athlone Town	27	(0)

International career
2008	Republic of Ireland U23		
- * Club domestic league appearances and goals as of 21:17, 29 October 2026 (UTC)

Brendan Clarke (born 17 September 1985) is an Irish football player who plays as a goalkeeper, most recently for League of Ireland First Division club Athlone Town.

== Club career ==
=== St Patrick's Athletic ===
Clarke is a goalkeeper and played schoolboy football for local side Cherry Orchard. He is one of a handful of local players to have played for St. Pats. Clarke had an extended spell in the first team at the end of the 2004 season as regular 'keeper Chris Adamson's form dropped.

In 2007, Clarke was sent on a season-long loan to Waterford United but was recalled before the season got underway. At the end of the 2007 season, Clarke played in the 4 of the last 5 league games. Keeping 3 clean sheets out of 4 ensuring the Saints secured UEFA Cup football in 2008. He only missed the last game of the season due to an injury during the warm-up.

He had a very successful loan spell at Sporting Fingal during the 2nd half of the 2008 season. He played 14 games for Fingal, keeping 7 clean sheets.

When coming back to the Saints for the 2009 season, Clarke was told by the then boss, John McDonnell, that he'd be his number 1 goalkeeper for the season. McDonnell then left the club and was replaced by Jeff Kenna as manager. Kenna let goalkeeper Barry Ryan go to Galway United and replaced him with Galway keeper Gary Rogers. Kenna favoured Rogers from day one and installed Rogers as his number 1 keeper. When Jeff Kenna resigned, new manager Pete Mahon came in and immediately put Clarke into the team. Clarke played in the final 10 games of the 2009 season and put in some fine performances. He kept 4 clean sheets in the 10 games including clean sheets against the Saints relegation rivals Bray Wanderers twice and Dundalk, and also keeping a clean sheet in the vital last game of the season against Shamrock Rovers.

=== Sporting Fingal ===
Following the 2009 season, Clarke signed a 2-year full-time contract with Sporting Fingal, where he'd had a very successful loan spell in 2008.

=== Sligo Rovers ===
After Sporting Fingal ceased trading Clarke's contract was cancelled and he signed for Sligo Rovers on a 1-year full-time contract on 15 February 2011. Clarke impressed immediately by saving a penalty on his debut in the 1–0 win over Derry City at The Brandywell. He followed this up by keeping 5 clean sheets in his first 6 games. He has gone on a great run and has currently kept 9 consecutive clean sheets, setting a new League of Ireland record for consecutive clean sheets. This has helped Rovers move to the top of the Airtricity League Premier Division. Solid performances from Clarke helped Sligo to a 2nd-place finish in the league and also a cup winners medal as Sligo lifted the FAI Cup for the second year in a row.

=== Return to St Patrick's Athletic ===
Clarke signed a contract to return to the Saints for the 2012 season on 21 December 2011. He earned his place as number one keeper ahead of Barry Murphy and kept five clean sheets in the opening eight games of the season, conceding only three goals. Clarke remained at the Saints for five seasons, in which he won the League in 2013, the 2014 President's Cup, the 2014 Leinster Senior Cup, the 2014 FAI Cup (the club's first in 53 years), as well as the League Cup in 2015 and 2016.

=== Limerick ===
On 3 December 2016, Limerick announced via their Twitter account that they had signed Clarke on a 2-year contract ahead of the 2017 season. He made a total of 55 appearances in all competitions with the club, winning the supporters player of the year award for 2017, before departing in the summer of 2018 due to financial difficulties at the club.

=== Third Spell at St Patrick's Athletic ===
He returned to St Patrick's Athletic for a third spell at the club, midway through their 2018 season. On 18 September 2018, he scored the first goal of his career, scoring the winner in a 2–1 win over Sligo Rovers from the penalty spot. In November 2018 he signed a new 2-year contract with the club. Despite being named the clubs Player of the Year by fans for the 2019 season, ahead of the 2020 season Clarke was told by manager Stephen O'Donnell that he could leave the club, however he decided to stay and fight for the starting spot with Conor Kearns and Brian Maher. By the end of the season Clarke had played every minute of every league game for the club and was voted Player of the Year for the second year running.

=== Shelbourne ===
He joined Shelbourne in November 2020 ahead of their 2021 League of Ireland First Division season.

=== Galway United ===
On 26 November 2022, it was announced that Clarke would be joining Galway United for their 2023 campaign. On 21 August 2023, he made his 500th career appearance in all competitions, in a 5–1 win away to UCD in the FAI Cup. On 22 September 2023, Clarke was part of the team that beat Kerry 4–0 to win the 2023 League of Ireland First Division, gaining promotion in the process. In June 2025, Galway turned down interest from Cork City who were looking to sign Clarke as a replacement for their departed goalkeeper Tein Troost. On 4 November 2025 Clarke announced his departure from the club, having made 99 appearances in all competitions during his 3 seasons there.

=== Athlone Town ===
On 6 November 2025, it was announced that Clarke had signed for League of Ireland First Division club Athlone Town ahead of the 2026 season. On 4 September 2026, Clarke made his 500th League of Ireland appearance in a 1–0 win away to Finn Harps. He served as club captain during his season with the club and made 30 appearances in all competitions before announcing his departure at the end of the season.

== International career ==
He has represented the Republic of Ireland at schools international level and was selected as part of the Republic of Ireland U23 squad to play Northern Ireland in 2008.

== Personal life ==
In April 2020, Clarke opened up about having previously used the mental health services made available to players via the PFAI and urged other players to avail of the services also should they need them. Clarke was named as Chairperson of the PFAI in September 2020, taking over from outgoing Chairperson & former teammate Gary Rogers, with Roberto Lopes as his vice-chairperson.

== Career statistics ==
As of match played 16 October 2026

Appearances and goals by club, season and competition
Club	Season	League			FAI Cup		League Cup		Europe		Other		Total	
Club	Season	Division	Apps	Goals	Apps	Goals	Apps	Goals	Apps	Goals	Apps	Goals	Apps	Goals
St Patrick's Athletic	2003	LOI Premier Division	0	0	0	0	0	0	—		—		0	0
St Patrick's Athletic	2004	LOI Premier Division	6	0	0	0	2	0	—		—		8	0
St Patrick's Athletic	2005	LOI Premier Division	4	0	0	0	0	0	—		—		4	0
St Patrick's Athletic	2006	LOI Premier Division	1	0	0	0	0	0	—		—		1	0
St Patrick's Athletic	2007	LOI Premier Division	4	0	0	0	1	0	0 (Note: Appearances in UEFA Cup)	0	1 (Note: Appearances in Setanta Sports Cup)	0	6	0
St Patrick's Athletic	2008	LOI Premier Division	5	0	—		0	0	0	0	1	0	6	0
St Patrick's Athletic	2009	LOI Premier Division	9	0	0	0	1	0	0 (Note: Appearances in UEFA Europa League)	0	1	0	11	0
St Patrick's Athletic	Total		29	0	0	0	4	0	0	0	3	0	36	0
Sporting Fingal (loan)	2008	LOI First Division	14	0	1	0	—		—		—		15	0
Sporting Fingal	2010	LOI Premier Division	17	0	1	0	1	0	2	0	0 (Note: Appearances in Leinster Senior Cup)	0	21	0
Sligo Rovers	2011	LOI Premier Division	31	0	5	0	3	0	2	0	2	0	43	0
St Patrick's Athletic	2012	LOI Premier Division	20	0	2	0	0	0	6	0	1	0	29	0
St Patrick's Athletic	2013	LOI Premier Division	30	0	3	0	0	0	2	0	2 (Note: 2 appearances in Setanta Sports Cup & 1 appearance in Leinster Senior Cup)	0	37	0
St Patrick's Athletic	2014	LOI Premier Division	33	0	5	0	0	0	2 (Note: Appearances in UEFA Champions League)	0	4 (Note: 2 appearances in Setanta Sports Cup, 1 appearance in President's Cup & 1 appearance in Leinster Senior Cup)	0	44	0
St Patrick's Athletic	2015	LOI Premier Division	16	0	2	0	1	0	2	0	2 (Note: 1 appearance in President's Cup & 1 appearance in Leinster Senior Cup)	0	23	0
St Patrick's Athletic	2016	LOI Premier Division	29	0	4	0	2	0	4	0	0	0	39	0
St Patrick's Athletic	Total		128	0	16	0	3	0	16	0	9	0	172	0
Limerick	2017	LOI Premier Division	26	0	4	0	1	0	—		0 (Note: Appearances in Munster Senior Cup)	0	31	0
Limerick	2018	LOI Premier Division	24	0	—		0	0	—		0	0	24	0
Limerick	Total		50	0	4	0	1	0	—		0	0	55	0
St Patrick's Athletic	2018	LOI Premier Division	12	1	2	0	—		—		1	0	15	1
St Patrick's Athletic	2019	LOI Premier Division	34	0	2	0	0	0	2	0	0	0	38	0
St Patrick's Athletic	2020	LOI Premier Division	18	0	0	0	—		—		—		18	0
St Patrick's Athletic	Total		64	1	4	0	0	0	2	0	1	0	71	1
Shelbourne	2021	LOI First Division	25	0	1	0	—		—		—		26	0
Shelbourne	2022	LOI Premier Division	29	0	4	0	—		—		—		33	0
Shelbourne	Total		54	0	5	0	—		—		—		59	0
Galway United	2023	LOI First Division	36	0	4	0	—		—		—		40	0
Galway United	2024	LOI Premier Division	36	0	2	0	—		—		—		38	0
Galway United	2025	LOI Premier Division	20	0	1	0	—		—		—		21	0
Galway United	Total		92	0	7	0	—		—		—		99	0
Athlone Town	2026	LOI First Division	27	0	2	0	—		—		1	0	30	0
Career total			506	1	45	0	12	0	22	0	16	0	601	1

== Honours ==
=== Club ===
St Patrick's Athletic

- League of Ireland Premier Division (1): 2013
- FAI Cup (1): 2014
- League of Ireland Cup (3): 2003, 2015, 2016
- President's Cup (1): 2014
- Leinster Senior Cup (2): 2014, 2019

Sligo Rovers

- FAI Cup (1): 2011

Shelbourne

- League of Ireland First Division (1): 2021

Galway United

- League of Ireland First Division (1): 2023

Maynooth University (As assistant manager)

- Collingwood Cup (1): 2014

=== Individual ===
- League of Ireland consecutive clean sheet record: 9 in 2011 with Sligo Rovers
- PFAI Premier Division Team of the Year (2): 2013, 2024
- PFAI Premier First Team of the Year (2): 2021, 2023
- SWAI Goalkeeper of the Year (1): 2013
- Limerick Supporters Club Player of the Year: 2017
- St Patrick's Athletic Player of the Year (2): 2019, 2020
- Galway United Player of the Year: 2024
- Galway Sports Star Award for Soccer: 2024
