= 2019 St Patrick's Athletic F.C. season =

St Patrick's Athletic F.C.
2019 season
- Chairman: Garrett Kelleher
- Coach: Harry Kenny (until 24 August); Stephen O'Donnell (from 31 August)
- Stadium: Richmond Park, Inchicore, Dublin 8
- League of Ireland: 5th
- FAI Cup: Second round (Eliminated by UCD)
- EA Sports Cup: Second round (Eliminated by Dundalk)
- Leinster Senior Cup: Champions
- Europa League: First qualifying round (Eliminated by IFK Norrköping)
- Top goalscorer: League: Mikey Drennan – 6 goals All: Mikey Drennan – 6 goals
- Highest home attendance: 5,340 vs Chelsea (13 July)
- Lowest home attendance: 250 (Est.) vs Wexford (18 February)
Home colours	Away colours	Third colours

The 2019 season was St. Patrick's Athletic F.C.'s 90th year in existence and was the Supersaint's 68th consecutive season in the top-flight of Irish football. It was the first season Harry Kenny took charge of the club, following Liam Buckley's spell in charge for the previous seven seasons. The fixtures were announced on 19 December 2018, with the Saints facing Cork City at home on the opening day of the season for the second year in a row, with the Inchicore side set to play champions Dundalk away from home on the final night of the season. Harry Kenny left his post on 24 August following a 3–1 loss away to bottom of the table UCD in the FAI Cup. He was replaced by Stephen O'Donnell on 31 August, his first managerial role. Pats finished 5th in the league and won the Leinster Senior Cup, playing the semi-final and final with their underage sides after the league season had ended for the senior team.

== Squad ==
No.	Name	Position(s)	Nationality	Hometown	Date of birth (age)	Previous club	Year signed	Club apps.	Club goals
Goalkeepers
1	Barry Murphy	GK	(Republic of Ireland)	Tallaght, Dublin	8 June 1985 (age 41)	(Republic of Ireland) Shamrock Rovers	2017	58	0
16	Brian Maher	GK	(Republic of Ireland)	Raheny, Dublin	1 November 2000 (age 25)	(Republic of Ireland) St Patrick's Athletic Under 17's	2018	5	0
26	Brendan Clarke	GK	(Republic of Ireland)	Inchicore, Dublin	17 September 1985 (age 40)	(Republic of Ireland) Limerick	2018	261	1
Defenders
2	David Webster	CB/RB	(Republic of Ireland)	Firhouse, Dublin	9 August 1989 (age 37)	(Republic of Ireland) Waterford	2019	28	2
3	Ian Bermingham (Captain)	LB	(Republic of Ireland)	Ballyfermot, Dublin	6 June 1989 (age 37)	(Republic of Ireland) Shamrock Rovers	2010	396	15
4	Kevin Toner	CB	(Republic of Ireland)	Ashbourne, Meath	18 July 1996 (age 30)	(England) Aston Villa	2018	67	9
5	Lee Desmond	CB/CDM/LB	(Republic of Ireland)	Donaghmede, Dublin	22 January 1995 (age 31)	(Republic of Ireland) Shelbourne	2015	175	1
12	Ciaran Kelly	CB/LB	(Republic of Ireland)	Lucan, Dublin	4 July 1998 (age 28)	(Republic of Ireland) Drogheda United	2019	35	1
17	Simon Madden	RB	(Republic of Ireland)	Tallaght, Dublin	1 May 1988 (age 38)	(Republic of Ireland) Shamrock Rovers	2018	73	3
30	Paul Cleary	RB/LB	(Republic of Ireland)	Lucan, Dublin	9 February 1999 (age 27)	(Republic of Ireland) Drogheda United	2018	5	1
	Padraig Finnerty	CB	(Republic of Ireland)	Dunshaughlin, Meath		(Republic of Ireland) St Patrick's Athletic Under 19's	2019	1	0
	Kevin O'Reilly	LB	(Republic of Ireland)	Clondalkin, Dublin	9 July 2001 (age 25)	(Republic of Ireland) St Patrick's Athletic Under 19's	2019	3	0
	Cian Kelly	CB	(Republic of Ireland)	Tallaght, Dublin	4 March 2002 (age 24)	(Republic of Ireland) St Patrick's Athletic Under 17's	2019	1	0
	Brandon Holt	LB	(Republic of Ireland)	Kilbarrack, Dublin	25 April 2002 (age 24)	(Republic of Ireland) St Patrick's Athletic Under 17's	2019	2	1
	Keith Carter	CB	(Republic of Ireland)	Swords, Dublin		(Republic of Ireland) St Patrick's Athletic Under 19's	2019	2	0
	Sean Madden	RB	(Republic of Ireland)	Clondalkin, Dublin	11 April 2001 (age 25)	(Republic of Ireland) St Patrick's Athletic Under 19's	2019	2	0
Midfielders
6	Conor Clifford	CM	(Republic of Ireland)	Ballyfermot, Dublin	29 January 1988 (age 38)	(Republic of Ireland) Limerick	2018	42	6
8	Darragh Markey	CAM	(Republic of Ireland)	Lucan, Dublin	23 May 1997 (age 29)	(Republic of Ireland) St Patrick's Athletic Under 19's	2015	105	4
10	Brandon Miele	CAM/RW	(Republic of Ireland)	Tallaght, Dublin	28 August 1994 (age 32)	(Republic of Ireland) Shamrock Rovers	2019	8	0
11	James Doona	CAM/LW/RW	(Republic of Ireland)	Inchicore, Dublin	15 January 1998 (age 28)	(Republic of Ireland) Shamrock Rovers	2018	39	5
14	Georgie Poynton	CM/RW/RB	(Republic of Ireland)	Laytown, Meath	8 September 1997 (age 29)	(Republic of Ireland) Dundalk	2019	1	0
18	Dean Clarke	RW/LW/ST	(Republic of Ireland)	Sandyford, Dublin	29 March 1993 (age 33)	(Republic of Ireland) Limerick	2018	62	7
19	Chris Forrester	CAM/LW/CDM	(Republic of Ireland)	Smithfield, Dublin	17 December 1992 (age 33)	(Scotland) Aberdeen	2019	192	45
20	Jamie Lennon	CM	(Republic of Ireland)	Santry, Dublin	9 May 1998 (age 28)	(Republic of Ireland) St Patrick's Athletic Under 19's	2017	69	1
23	Cian Coleman	CM	(Republic of Ireland)	Cork City, Cork	1 January 1997 (age 29)	(Republic of Ireland) Limerick	2019	27	0
24	Rhys McCabe	CM	(Scotland)	Polbeth, West Lothian	24 July 1992 (age 34)	(Republic of Ireland) Sligo Rovers	2019	27	1
32	Kevin Kelly	LW	(Republic of Ireland)	Dublin	17 October 2000 (age 25)	(Republic of Ireland) St Patrick's Athletic Under 19's	2019	2	0
35	Darragh Burns	RW	(Republic of Ireland)	Stamullen, Meath	8 June 2002 (age 24)	(Republic of Ireland) St Patrick's Athletic Under 19's	2019	2	0
	Cian Hughes	CM	(Republic of Ireland)	Ratoath, Meath	7 March 2000 (age 26)	(Republic of Ireland) St Patrick's Athletic Under 19's	2017	4	0
	Ben McCormack	LW	(Republic of Ireland)	Harmonstown, Dublin	4 April 2003 (age 23)	(Republic of Ireland) St Patrick's Athletic Under 17's	2019	1	0
	Daniel Dobbin	CM	(Republic of Ireland)	Dublin		(Republic of Ireland) St Patrick's Athletic Under 19's	2019	2	2
	Jamie Whelan	CM	(Republic of Ireland)	Clondalkin, Dublin		(Republic of Ireland) St Patrick's Athletic Under 17's	2019	2	0
	Kian Corbally	RW	(Republic of Ireland)	Palmerstown, Dublin	31 December 2003 (age 22)	(Republic of Ireland) St Patrick's Athletic Under 17's	2019	2	1
Forwards
7	Gary Shaw	ST	(Republic of Ireland)	Newbridge, Kildare	10 May 1992 (age 34)	(Republic of Ireland) Shamrock Rovers	2019	35	2
9	Mikey Drennan	ST	(Republic of Ireland)	Kilkenny City, Kilkenny	2 February 1994 (age 32)	(Republic of Ireland) Sligo Rovers	2019	30	6
21	Glen McAuley	ST	(Republic of Ireland)	Tallaght, Dublin	24 February 2000 (age 26)	(England) Liverpool	2019	10	2
25	Ronan Hale	ST	(Northern Ireland)	Belfast, Antrim	8 September 1998 (age 28)	(Northern Ireland) Crusaders	2019	9	1
28	Cian Kavanagh	ST	(Republic of Ireland)	Baldoyle, Dublin	3 January 2003 (age 23)	(Republic of Ireland) St Patrick's Athletic Under 15's	2019	0	0
31	Jake Walker	ST	(Republic of Ireland)	Clondalkin, Dublin	19 August 2000 (age 26)	(Republic of Ireland) St Patrick's Athletic Under 19's	2017	29	3
	Kyle Robinson	ST	(Republic of Ireland)	Lucan, Dublin	8 November 2002 (age 23)	(Republic of Ireland) St Patrick's Athletic Under 17's	2019	3	2
	Dara McGuinness	ST	(Republic of Ireland)	Athlone, Westmeath	12 February 2004 (age 22)	(Republic of Ireland) St Patrick's Athletic Under 15's	2019	1	0

=== Transfers ===
==== Preseason ====
===== In =====
Player	Country	Position	Signed from
Gary Shaw	(Republic of Ireland)	Forward	(Republic of Ireland) Shamrock Rovers
David Webster	(Republic of Ireland)	Defender	(Republic of Ireland) Waterford
Ciaran Kelly	(Republic of Ireland)	Defender	(Republic of Ireland) Drogheda United
Cian Coleman	(Republic of Ireland)	Midfielder	(Republic of Ireland) Limerick
Georgie Poynton	(Republic of Ireland)	Midfielder	(Republic of Ireland) Dundalk
Brandon Miele	(Republic of Ireland)	Midfielder	(Republic of Ireland) Shamrock Rovers
Mikey Drennan	(Republic of Ireland)	Forward	(Republic of Ireland) Sligo Rovers
Rhys McCabe	(Scotland)	Midfielder	(Republic of Ireland) Sligo Rovers
Chris Forrester	(Republic of Ireland)	Midfielder	(Scotland) Aberdeen

===== Out =====
Player	Country	Position	Sold to
Conan Byrne	(Republic of Ireland)	Midfielder	(Republic of Ireland) Shelbourne
Ryan Brennan	(Republic of Ireland)	Midfielder	(Republic of Ireland) Shelbourne
Michael Barker	(Republic of Ireland)	Defender	(Republic of Ireland) Bohemians
Thomas Byrne	(Republic of Ireland)	Midfielder	(Republic of Ireland) Drogheda United
Killian Brennan	(Republic of Ireland)	Midfielder	Retired
Michael Leahy	(Republic of Ireland)	Defender	(Australia) UNSW FC
Ian Turner	(Republic of Ireland)	Midfielder	(Republic of Ireland) Cobh Ramblers
Joe Manley	(Republic of Ireland)	Defender	(Republic of Ireland) Longford Town
Jake Keegan	(United States)	Forward	(United States) Greenville Triumph
Luke Heeney	(Republic of Ireland)	Midfielder	(Republic of Ireland) Drogheda United
Achille Campion	(France)	Forward	Released
Christy Fagan	(Republic of Ireland)	Forward	Retired
Luke McNally	(Republic of Ireland)	Defender	(Republic of Ireland) Drogheda United (loan)
Georgie Poynton	(Republic of Ireland)	Midfielder	(Republic of Ireland) Waterford

==== Mid-season ====
===== In =====
Player	Country	Position	Signed from
Glen McAuley	(Republic of Ireland)	Forward	(England) Liverpool
Ronan Hale	(Northern Ireland)	Forward	(Northern Ireland) Crusaders

===== Out =====
Player	Country	Position	Sold to
Brandon Miele	(Republic of Ireland)	Midfielder	Released
Cian Kavanagh	(Republic of Ireland)	Forward	(Scotland) Hearts

=== Squad statistics ===
==== Appearances, goals and cards ====
Number in brackets represents (appearances of which were substituted ON). Last updated – 17 November 2019

No.	Player	SSE Airtricity League		FAI Cup		EA Sports Cup		Europa League		Leinster Senior Cup		Total	
No.	Player	Apps	Goals	Apps	Goals	Apps	Goals	Apps	Goals	Apps	Goals	Apps	Goals
1	Barry Murphy	2	0	0	0	1	0	0	0	1	0	4	0
2	David Webster	24(1)	1	2	1	1	0	0	0	1	0	28(1)	2
3	Ian Bermingham	35	0	2	0	1(1)	0	2	0	0	0	40(1)	0
4	Kevin Toner	26	3	1(1)	0	0	0	2	0	1(1)	0	30(2)	3
5	Lee Desmond	31	1	2	0	1	0	2	0	0	0	36	1
6	Conor Clifford	25(3)	2	2	1	1	0	2	1	0	0	30(3)	4
7	Gary Shaw	29(9)	1	1(1)	0	1	0	2	0	2	1	35(10)	2
8	Darragh Markey	25(5)	2	2	0	1	0	1(1)	0	1	0	30(6)	2
9	Mikey Drennan	26	6	0	0	1(1)	0	2	0	1	0	30(1)	6
10	Brandon Miele	7(3)	0	0	0	0	0	0	0	1	0	8(3)	0
11	James Doona	15(14)	2	0	0	1	1	0	0	2	0	18(14)	3
12	Ciaran Kelly	25(1)	1	2	0	1	0	2	0	2	0	32(1)	1
14	Georgie Poynton	0	0	0	0	0	0	0	0	1	0	1	0
16	Brian Maher	0	0	0	0	0	0	0	0	3	0	3	0
17	Simon Madden	28	1	1	0	1	0	2	0	0	0	32	1
18	Dean Clarke	21(7)	2	2	0	1	0	2(2)	0	0	0	26(9)	2
19	Chris Forrester	30(10)	2	1(1)	0	1(1)	0	0	0	2	1	34(12)	3
20	Jamie Lennon	28(5)	0	1	0	0	0	2	0	0	0	31(5)	0
21	Glen McAuley	8(5)	1	2(1)	1	0	0	0	0	0	0	10(6)	2
23	Cian Coleman	19(7)	0	2(1)	0	1	0	2	0	2	0	26(8)	0
24	Rhys McCabe	25(4)	1	0	0	0	0	2(2)	0	0	0	27(6)	1
25	Ronan Hale	7(4)	1	2	0	0	0	0	0	0	0	9(4)	1
26	Brendan Clarke	34	0	2	0	0	0	2	0	0	0	38	0
28	Cian Kavanagh	0	0	0	0	0	0	0	0	0	0	0	0
30	Paul Cleary	0	0	0	0	0	0	0	0	4	1	4	1
31	Jake Walker	22(18)	1	1(1)	0	0	0	1(1)	0	4(1)	2	28(21)	3
32	Kevin Kelly	0	0	0	0	0	0	0	0	2(2)	0	2(2)	0
35	Darragh Burns	0	0	0	0	0	0	0	0	2(1)	0	2(1)	0
	Cian Hughes	0	0	0	0	0	0	0	0	3(1)	0	3(1)	0
	Padraig Finnerty	0	0	0	0	0	0	0	0	1	0	1	0
	Kevin O'Reilly	0	0	0	0	0	0	0	0	3	0	3	0
	Kyle Robinson	0	0	0	0	0	0	0	0	3(2)	2	3(2)	2
	Cian Kelly	0	0	0	0	0	0	0	0	1	0	1	0
	Ben McCormack	0	0	0	0	0	0	0	0	1	0	1	0
	Brandon Holt	0	0	0	0	0	0	0	0	2	1	2	1
	Daniel Dobbin	0	0	0	0	0	0	0	0	2	2	2	2
	Jamie Whelan	0	0	0	0	0	0	0	0	2	0	2	0
	Keith Carter	0	0	0	0	0	0	0	0	2(1)	0	2(1)	0
	Sean Madden	0	0	0	0	0	0	0	0	2(2)	0	2(2)	0
	Kian Corbally	0	0	0	0	0	0	0	0	2(1)	1	2(1)	1
	Dara McGuinness	0	0	0	0	0	0	0	0	1(1)	0	1(1)	0

==== Top scorers ====
Includes all competitive matches. Last updated 17 November 2019

Number	Name	SSE Airtricity League	FAI Cup	EA Sports Cup	Europa League	Leinster Senior Cup	Total
9	Mikey Drennan	6	0	0	0	0	6
6	Conor Clifford	2	1	0	1	0	4
31	Jake Walker	1	0	0	0	2	3
11	James Doona	2	0	1	0	0	3
19	Chris Forrester	2	0	0	0	1	3
4	Kevin Toner	3	0	0	0	0	3
	Daniel Dobbin	0	0	0	0	2	2
	Kyle Robinson	0	0	0	0	2	2
7	Gary Shaw	1	0	0	0	1	2
8	Darragh Markey	2	0	0	0	0	2
2	David Webster	1	1	0	0	0	2
21	Glen McAuley	1	1	0	0	0	2
18	Dean Clarke	2	0	0	0	0	2
	Brandon Holt	0	0	0	0	1	1
	Daniel Dobbin	0	0	0	0	1	1
24	Rhys McCabe	1	0	0	0	0	1
25	Ronan Hale	1	0	0	0	0	1
17	Simon Madden	1	0	0	0	0	1
12	Ciaran Kelly	1	0	0	0	0	1
5	Lee Desmond	1	0	0	0	0	1
30	Paul Cleary	0	0	0	0	1	1
	Own Goals	1	0	0	0	0	1

==== Top assists ====
Includes all competitive matches. Last updated 17 November 2019

Number	Name	SSE Airtricity League	FAI Cup	EA Sports Cup	Europa League	Leinster Senior Cup	Total
31	Jake Walker	2	0	0	0	2	4
9	Mikey Drennan	4	0	0	0	0	4
	Cian Hughes	0	0	0	0	3	3
20	Jamie Lennon	3	0	0	0	0	3
8	Darragh Markey	2	0	0	1	0	3
7	Gary Shaw	3	0	0	0	0	3
24	Rhys McCabe	3	0	0	0	0	3
3	Ian Bermingham	2	0	0	0	0	2
4	Kevin Toner	1	1	0	0	0	2
18	Dean Clarke	1	1	0	0	0	2
23	Cian Coleman	1	0	0	0	1	2
5	Lee Desmond	1	0	1	0	0	2
11	James Doona	0	0	0	0	2	2
6	Conor Clifford	2	0	0	0	0	2
	Sean Madden	0	0	0	0	1	1
	Kevin O'Reilly	0	0	0	0	1	1
17	Simon Madden	1	0	0	0	0	1

==== Top clean sheets ====
Includes all competitive matches. Last updated 17 November 2019

Position	Number	Name	SSE Airtricity League	FAI Cup	EA Sports Cup	Europa League	Leinster Senior Cup	Total
GK	1	Barry Murphy	1/2	0/0	0/1	0/0	1/1	2/4
GK	16	Brian Maher	0/0	0/0	0/0	0/0	2/3	2/3
GK	26	Brendan Clarke	12/34	0/2	0/0	0/2	0/0	12/38

==== Disciplinary record ====
Number	Name	SSE Airtricity League		FAI Cup		EA Sports Cup		Europa League		Leinster Senior Cup		Total	
Number	Name	Booked	Sent off (straight red)	Booked	Sent off (straight red)	Booked	Sent off (straight red)	Booked	Sent off (straight red)	Booked	Sent off (straight red)	Booked	Sent off (straight red)
6	Conor Clifford	9	0	0	0	0	0	1	0	0	0	10	0
4	Kevin Toner	7	1	0	0	0	0	1	0	0	0	8	1
12	Ciaran Kelly	6	0	0	0	0	0	2	1	0	0	8	1
9	Mikey Drennan	6	2	0	0	0	0	0	0	0	0	6	2
2	David Webster	7	1	0	0	0	0	1	0	0	0	8	1
18	Dean Clarke	5	0	1	0	0	0	0	0	0	0	6	0
20	Jamie Lennon	5	0	0	0	0	0	1	0	0	0	6	0
17	Simon Madden	3	0	1	0	0	0	0	0	0	0	4	0
3	Ian Bermingham	4	0	0	0	0	0	0	0	0	0	4	0
24	Rhys McCabe	4	0	0	0	0	0	0	0	0	0	4	0
31	Jake Walker	1	0	1	0	0	0	0	0	1	0	3	0
8	Darragh Markey	3	0	0	0	0	0	0	0	0	0	3	0
26	Brendan Clarke	3	0	0	0	0	0	0	0	0	0	3	0
7	Gary Shaw	3	0	0	0	0	0	0	0	0	0	3	0
23	Cian Coleman	1	0	0	0	0	0	0	0	1	0	2	0
11	James Doona	1	0	0	0	0	0	0	0	1	0	2	0
21	Glen McAuley	0	0	2	0	0	0	0	0	0	0	2	0
19	Chris Forrester	2	0	0	0	0	0	0	0	0	0	2	0
5	Lee Desmond	2	0	0	0	0	0	0	0	0	0	2	0
	Brandon Holt	0	0	0	0	0	0	0	0	1	0	1	0
	Jamie Whelan	0	0	0	0	0	0	0	0	1	0	1	0
	Kyle Robinson	0	0	0	0	0	0	0	0	1	0	1	0
	Cian Hughes	0	0	0	0	0	0	0	0	1	0	1	0
	Darragh Burns	0	0	0	0	0	0	0	0	1	0	1	0
	Cian Kelly	0	0	0	0	0	0	0	0	1	0	1	0
Totals		71	4	5	0	0	0	6	1	9	0	92	5

==== Captains ====
No.	P	Name	Country	No. games	Notes
3	DF	Ian Bermingham	(Republic of Ireland)	38	Captain
16	GK	Brian Maher	(Republic of Ireland)	2	
5	DF	Lee Desmond	(Republic of Ireland)	2	
2	DF	David Webster	(Republic of Ireland)	1	
19	MF	Chris Forrester	(Republic of Ireland)	1	

Last updated: 17 November 2019
Source: Competitive match reports.
Competitive matches only
Matches started as captain only
Country: FIFA nationality; No.: Squad number; P: Position; Name: Player name; No. Games: Number of games started as captain.

== Club ==
=== Coaching staff ===
- Manager: Stephen O'Donnell
- Assistant manager: Pat Cregg
- Director of Football: Ger O'Brien
- Coach: Martin Doyle
- Coach: Seán O'Connor
- Goalkeeping coach: Pat Jennings
- Strength and Conditioning Coach: Mark Kenneally
- Physio: Lee Van Keeftan
- Physio: Christy O'Neill
- Club Doctor: Dr Matt Corcoran
- Equipment Manager: David McGill
- Under 19s Manager: Jamie Moore
- Under 19s Coach: Simon Madden
- Under 19s Coach: Sean Doody
- Under 17s Manager: Darragh O'Reilly
- Under 17s Assistant Manager: Sean Gahan
- Under 15s Manager: Seán O'Connor
- Under 15s Coach: Ian Bermingham
- Under 13s Manager: Mark Connolly
- Under 13s Coach: Brendan Clarke
- Under 19s/17s Goalkeeping Coach: Stephen O'Reilly

=== Kit ===
Supplier: Umbro
Sponsor(s): MIG Insurance Brokers (Front of Jersey)
Bill Griffin Motors (Back of Jersey)
Greenisle Hotel (Sleeves of Jersey)

Home	Away	Third	Alternate

The club released a new Away kit for the season, with the Home and Third kits being retained from the 2018 season.

Type	Shirt	Shorts	Socks	Info
Home	Red/White Shoulders	White	Red	Worn 34 times; against Cork City (LOI) (H), Wexford (LSC) (H), Finn Harps (LOI) (H), UCD (LOI) (A), Shamrock Rovers (LOI) (H), Waterford (LOI) (A), Dundalk (LOI) (H), Cork City (LOI) (A), Dundalk (LOI) (H), Derry City (LOI) (H), Sligo Rovers (LOI) (H), Finn Harps (LOI) (A), UCD (LOI) (H), Shamrock Rovers (LOI) (A), Waterford (LOI) (H), Bohemians (LOI) (H), Derry City (LOI) (H), Cork City (LOI) (H), Finn Harps (LOI) (H), UCD (LOI) (A), Shamrock Rovers (LOI) (H), Waterford (LOI) (A), IFK Norrköping (UEL) (H), Chelsea (FRN) (H), IFK Norrköping (UEL) (A), Dundalk (LOI) (H), Bray Wanderers (FAI) (H), Sligo Rovers (LOI) (H), UCD (FAI) (A), Finn Harps (LOI) (A), UCD (LOI) (H), Shamrock Rovers (LOI) (A), Waterford (LOI) (H), Bohemians (LOI) (H)
Away	White	Red	White	Worn 5 times; against Sligo Rovers (LOI) (A), Bohemians (LOI) (A), Dundalk (EAC) (H), Sligo Rovers (LOI) (A), Bohemians (LOI) (A)
Third	Blue	Blue	Blue	Worn 7 times; against Derry City (LOI) (A), Dundalk (LOI) (A), Cabinteely (LSC) (A), Derry City (LOI) (A), Dundalk (LOI) (A), Sheriff YC (LSC) (A), Athlone Town (LSC) (H)
Fourth	Red/White Sash	White	Red	Worn 7 times; against Wexford (FRN) (N), Cobh Ramblers (FRN) (N), Bray Wanderers (FRN) (N), FAI ETB (FRN) (A), Shelbourne (FRN) (N), Athlone Town (FRN) (N), Drogheda United (FRN) (H)

Key:
LOI=League of Ireland Premier Division
FAI=FAI Cup
EAC=EA Sports Cup
UEL=UEFA Europa League
LSC=Leinster Senior Cup
FRN=Friendly

== Competitions ==
=== League of Ireland ===
==== League table ====
Pos	Team	Pld	W	D	L	GF	GA	GD	Pts	Qualification or relegation
1	Dundalk (C)	36	27	5	4	73	18	+55	86	Qualification for Champions League first qualifying round
2	Shamrock Rovers	36	23	6	7	62	21	+41	75	Qualification for Europa League first qualifying round (Note: Since the winners of the 2019 FAI Cup (Shamrock Rovers) qualified for European competition based on their league position, the final spot awarded to the Cup winner passed to the next best-placed team i.e fourth-placed team.)
3	Bohemians	36	17	9	10	47	28	+19	60	Qualification for Europa League first qualifying round
4	Derry City	36	15	12	9	56	34	+22	57	Qualification for Europa League first qualifying round
5	St Patrick's Athletic	36	14	10	12	29	35	−6	52	
6	Waterford	36	12	7	17	46	53	−7	43	
7	Sligo Rovers	36	10	12	14	38	47	−9	42	
8	Cork City	36	9	10	17	29	49	−20	37	
9	Finn Harps (O)	36	7	7	22	26	64	−38	28	Qualification for relegation play-offs
10	UCD (R)	36	5	4	27	25	82	−57	19	Relegation to League of Ireland First Division

Source: SSE Airtricity League, Soccerway
Rules for classification: 1) Points; 2) Goal difference; 3) Goals scored.
(C) Champions; (O) Play-off winners; (R) Relegated

==== Results summary ====
Overall								Home						Away					
Pld	W	D	L	GF	GA	GD	Pts	W	D	L	GF	GA	GD	W	D	L	GF	GA	GD
36	14	10	12	29	35	−6	52	7	5	6	13	16	−3	7	5	6	16	19	−3

Last updated: 29 October 2019.

==== Results by round ====
Round	1	2	3	4	5	6	7	8	9	10	11	12	13	14	15	16	17	18	19	20	21	22	23	24	25	26	27	28	29	30	31	32	33	34	35	36
Ground	H	A	H	A	H	A	A	H	A	H	H	A	H	A	H	A	H	H	A	H	A	H	A	H	A	A	H	A	H	A	H	A	H	H	A	A
Result	W	W	D	D	L	L	L	W	D	L	W	W	W	L	L	D	D	W	L	D	D	W	W	L	W	L	L	W	W	W	D	D	L	D	W	L
Position	3	3	2	2	5	6	7	5	5	5	5	5	5	5	5	5	5	5	5	5	5	5	5	5	4	5	5	5	5	5	5	5	5	5	5	5

Updated to match(es) played on 29 October 2019. Source: 2019 League of Ireland Premier Division
A = Away; H = Home; W = Win; D = Draw; L = Loss

==== Matches ====
Win Draw Loss

15 February 2019 Round 1	St Patrick's Athletic	1–0	Cork City	Inchicore, Dublin 8
19:45 GMT	Conor Clifford (yellow card) 15'; Jamie Lennon (yellow card) 23'; Mikey Drennan 29' (pen.); Kevin Toner (yellow card) 53'; Rhys McCabe (yellow card) 90+6'		Conor McCormack (yellow card) 48'	Stadium: Richmond Park; Attendance: 3,497; Referee: Neil Doyle
Note: Rascals Brewery Man of the Match: Conor Clifford

22 February 2019 Round 2	Sligo Rovers	0–1	St Patrick's Athletic	Sligo, County Sligo
19:45 GMT	Ronan Coughlan (yellow card) 85'		David Webster (yellow card) 65'; Conor Clifford (yellow card) 90'; Mikey Drennan 90+2'	Stadium: The Showgrounds; Attendance: 3,314; Referee: Damien McGrath

25 February 2019 Round 3	St Patrick's Athletic	0–0	Finn Harps	Inchicore, Dublin 8
19:45 GMT	Kevin Toner (yellow card) 82'		Keith Cowan (yellow card) 22'; Sam Todd (yellow card) 58'; Seán Boyd (yellow card) 74'; Mark Coyle (yellow card) 86'	Stadium: Richmond Park; Attendance: 1,747; Referee: Graham Kelly
Note: Rascals Brewery Man of the Match: Simon Madden

1 March 2019 Round 4	UCD	1–1	St Patrick's Athletic	Belfield, Dublin 4
19:45 GMT	Paul Doyle (yellow card) 45'; Conor Davis 60'; Dan Tobin (yellow card) 67'; Josh Collins (yellow card) 82'		Mikey Drennan 28'; Jamie Lennon (yellow card) 83'; Simon Madden (yellow card) 89'	Stadium: UCD Bowl; Attendance: 940; Referee: Rob Harvey

8 March 2019 Round 5	St Patrick's Athletic	0–1	Shamrock Rovers	Inchicore, Dublin 8
19:45 GMT	Kevin Toner (yellow card) 8'; Conor Clifford (yellow card) 31'		Aaron McEneff 8' (pen.); Greg Bolger (yellow card) 88'	Stadium: Richmond Park; Attendance: 4,389; Referee: Neil Doyle
Note: Rascals Brewery Man of the Match: Brendan Clarke

15 March 2019 Round 6	Waterford	2–0	St Patrick's Athletic	Waterford City, County Waterford
19:45 GMT	Aaron Drinan 19'; Karolis Chvedukas (yellow card) 38'; Shane Duggan (yellow card) 51'; Aaron Drinan 63'		Kevin Toner (yellow card) 17'	Stadium: RSC; Attendance: 2,013; Referee: Paul McLoughlin

29 March 2019 Round 7	Bohemians	1–0	St Patrick's Athletic	Phibsborough, Dublin 7
19:45 GMT	Keith Buckley 43'		David Webster (yellow card) 70'; Mikey Drennan (red card) 76'	Stadium: Dalymount Park; Attendance: 3,634; Referee: Rob Rogers

5 April 2019 Round 8	St Patrick's Athletic	1–0	Dundalk	Inchicore, Dublin 8
19:45 GMT	Rhys McCabe (yellow card) 28'; Daniel Cleary 45+1' (o.g.)		Dane Massey (yellow card) 40'	Stadium: Richmond Park; Attendance: 1,878; Referee: Ray Matthews
Note: Rascals Brewery Man of the Match: Rhys McCabe

12 April 2019 Round 9	Cork City	1–1	St Patrick's Athletic	Turners Cross, County Cork
19:45 GMT	Dan Casey (yellow card) 31'; Graham Cummins 36' (pen.); Graham Cummins (yellow card) 89'		Ian Bermingham (yellow card) 20'; David Webster (red card) 34'; Dean Clarke 90'	Stadium: Turner's Cross; Attendance: 2,406; Referee: Sean Grant

15 April 2019 Round 10	St Patrick's Athletic	1–3	Derry City	Inchicore, Dublin 8
19:45 GMT	Kevin Toner (red card) 19'; Gary Shaw 32'		Patrick McClean 2'; Gerardo Bruna 18'; Junior Ogedi-Uzokwe 30'	Stadium: Richmond Park; Attendance: 1,300 (Est.); Referee: Paul McLoughlin
Note: Rascals Brewery Man of the Match: Simon Madden; This fixture was originally set for Round 7 on 22 March but was postponed due to international call ups.

19 April 2019 Round 11	St Patrick's Athletic	2–1	Sligo Rovers	Inchicore, Dublin 8
19:45 GMT	Chris Forrester 15'; Mikey Drennan 24' (pen.); Ciaran Kelly (yellow card) 29'; Ian Bermingham (yellow card) 53'; Rhys McCabe (yellow card) 86'		John Mahon (yellow card) 63'; Romeo Parkes (yellow card) 63'; David Cawley 88'	Stadium: Richmond Park; Attendance: 1,548; Referee: Robert Hennessey
Note: Rascals Brewery Man of the Match: Chris Forrester

22 April 2019 Round 12	Finn Harps	0–2	St Patrick's Athletic	Ballybofey, County Donegal
17:00 GMT	Caolan McAleer (yellow card) 56'		Conor Clifford 34'; Kevin Toner (yellow card) 42'; Mikey Drennan 68' (pen.)	Stadium: Finn Park; Attendance: 659; Referee: Rob Rogers

26 April 2019 Round 13	St Patrick's Athletic	2–0	UCD	Inchicore, Dublin 8
19:45 GMT	Ciaran Kelly 59'; Mikey Drennan 85'			Stadium: Richmond Park; Attendance: 1,166; Referee: John McLoughlin
Note: Rascals Brewery Man of the Match: Ciaran Kelly

29 April 2019 Round 14	Shamrock Rovers	1–0	St Patrick's Athletic	Tallaght, Dublin 24
20:00 GMT	Ronan Finn 34'; Jack Byrne (yellow card) 61'; Trevor Clarke (yellow card) 79'; Orhan Vojic (yellow card) 90+3'		Ciaran Kelly (yellow card) 53'; Darragh Markey (yellow card) 57'; Lee Desmond (yellow card) 90+1'	Stadium: Tallaght Stadium; Attendance: 3,920; Referee: Ben Connolly

3 May 2019 Round 15	St Patrick's Athletic	0–3	Waterford	Inchicore, Dublin 8
19:45 GMT	Ciaran Kelly (yellow card) 12'		Georgie Poynton (yellow card) 25'; Ismahil Akinade 63'; Zack Elbouzedi 69'; Aaron Drinan 88'	Stadium: Richmond Park; Attendance: 1,397; Referee: Ray Matthews
Note: Rascals Brewery Man of the Match: Jamie Lennon

10 May 2019 Round 16	Derry City	1–1	St Patrick's Athletic	Derry, Northern Ireland
19:45 GMT	Barry McNamee 9'		Lee Desmond 30'; Simon Madden (yellow card) 67'; Gary Shaw (yellow card) 69'	Stadium: Ryan McBride Brandywell Stadium; Attendance: 2,500 (Est.); Referee: Derek Tomney

17 May 2019 Round 17	St Patrick's Athletic	1–1	Bohemians	Inchicore, Dublin 8
19:45 GMT	Ciaran Kelly (yellow card) 38'; Darragh Markey 40'; Rhys McCabe (yellow card) 43'; Mikey Drennan (yellow card) 70'; Ian Bermingham (yellow card) 70'; Simon Madden (yellow card) 71'; Jamie Lennon (yellow card) 77'		Derek Pender (yellow card) 43'; Conor Levingston (yellow card) 53'; Dinny Corcoran (penalty missed) 71'; Danny Mandroiu 78'; James Finnerty (yellow card) 80'	Stadium: Richmond Park; Attendance: 2,908; Referee: Rob Harvey
Note: Rascals Brewery Man of the Match: Brendan Clarke

21 May 2019 Round 18	St Patrick's Athletic	1–0	Derry City	Inchicore, Dublin 8
19:45 GMT	Kevin Toner 23'; David Webster (yellow card) 90'		Conor McDermott (yellow card) 51'	Stadium: Richmond Park; Attendance: 1,070; Referee: Sean Grant
Note: Rascals Brewery Man of the Match: Kevin Toner; This fixture was originally set for Round 25 on 12 July but was rescheduled due to St Patrick's Athletic's UEFA Europa League involvement.

24 May 2019 Round 19	Dundalk	1–0	St Patrick's Athletic	Dundalk, County Louth
19:45 GMT	Seán Hoare 90'		Gary Shaw (yellow card) 55'; Mikey Drennan (yellow card) 82'; David Webster (yellow card) 84'; Brendan Clarke (yellow card) 89'; Ian Bermingham (yellow card) 90+3'	Stadium: Oriel Park; Attendance: 2,377; Referee: Paul McLaughlin

31 May 2019 Round 20	St Patrick's Athletic	1–1	Cork City	Inchicore, Dublin 8
19:45 GMT	David Webster (yellow card) 61'; Simon Madden 90+5'		Sean McLoughlin (yellow card) 19'; Karl Sheppard 54'; Conor McCormack (yellow card) 60'; Conor McCarthy (yellow card) 73'; Karl Sheppard (yellow card) 90+3'; Gearóid Morrissey (yellow card) 90+5'	Stadium: Richmond Park; Attendance: 1,382; Referee: Ben Connolly
Note: Rascals Brewery Man of the Match: Simon Madden

8 June 2019 Round 21	Sligo Rovers	1–1	St Patrick's Athletic	Sligo, County Sligo
19:45 GMT	Jack Keaney 80'		Kevin Toner 81'	Stadium: The Showgrounds; Attendance: 2,336; Referee: John McLoughlin

14 June 2019 Round 22	St Patrick's Athletic	1–0	Finn Harps	Inchicore, Dublin 8
19:45 GMT	Jake Walker 83'; Mikey Drennan (yellow card) 85'; Ciaran Kelly (yellow card) 90'		Tony McNamee (yellow card) 19'; Mikey Place (yellow card) 88'	Stadium: Richmond Park; Attendance: 1,358; Referee: Neil Doyle
Note: Rascals Brewery Man of the Match: Cian Coleman

28 June 2019 Round 23	UCD	0–1	St Patrick's Athletic	Belfield, Dublin 4
19:45 GMT	Liam Scales (yellow card) 76'		Kevin Toner 30'; Gary Shaw (yellow card) 90+2'	Stadium: UCD Bowl; Attendance: 600 (Est.); Referee: Ray Matthews

1 July 2019 Round 24	St Patrick's Athletic	0–2	Shamrock Rovers	Inchicore, Dublin 8
19:45 GMT	Jake Walker (yellow card) 32'; Chris Forrester (yellow card) 64'; James Doona (yellow card) 90'		Greg Bolger 45+2'; Seán Kavanagh 50'; Greg Bolger (yellow card) 72'	Stadium: Richmond Park; Attendance: 2,319; Referee: Graham Kelly
Note: Rascals Brewery Man of the Match: Not Announced

5 July 2019 Round 25	Waterford	1–2	St Patrick's Athletic	Waterford City, County Waterford
19:45 GMT	Cory Galvin 30'; Kenny Browne (yellow card) 49'; Dean O'Halloran (yellow card) 53'; Rory Feely (yellow card) 90+6'		Conor Clifford 32'; Conor Clifford (yellow card) 34'; Dean Clarke 62'; Lee Desmond (yellow card) 90+6'	Stadium: RSC; Attendance: 1,500 (Est.); Referee: Sean Grant

21 July 2019 Round 26	Bohemians	3–0	St Patrick's Athletic	Phibsborough, Dublin 7
15:00 GMT	Ryan Swan 43'; Paddy Kirk (yellow card) 63'; Conor Levingston 81' (pen.); Ryan Swan 90+2'		Dean Clarke (yellow card) 38'; Jamie Lennon (yellow card) 85'	Stadium: Dalymount Park; Attendance: 3,000 (Est.); Referee: Roebrt Rogers
Note: Fixture rearranged from 19 to 21 July due to St Patrick's Athletic's involvement in the Europa League on 18 July

27 July 2019 Round 27	St Patrick's Athletic	0–1	Dundalk	Inchicore, Dublin 8
17:30 GMT	Conor Clifford (yellow card) 35'; David Webster (yellow card) 60'; Chris Forrester (yellow card) 74'; Mikey Drennan (yellow card) 87'; Mikey Drennan (yellow card) 87' (yellow-red card)		John Mountney 52'	Stadium: Richmond Park; Attendance: 1,463; Referee: Robert Hennessey
Note: Rascals Brewery Man of the Match: Not Announced; Fixture rearranged from 26 to 27 July due to Dundalk's involvement in the Champions League on 24 July

2 August 2019 Round 28	Cork City	0–1	St Patrick's Athletic	Turners Cross, County Cork
20:00 GMT	Ronan Hurley (yellow card) 75'; Karl Sheppard (yellow card) 83'		Ciaran Kelly (yellow card) 37'; Conor Clifford (yellow card) 63'; Ronan Hale 90+1'	Stadium: Turner's Cross; Attendance: 2,195; Referee: Ben Connolly

16 August 2019 Round 29	St Patrick's Athletic	2–1	Sligo Rovers	Inchicore, Dublin 8
19:45 GMT	Dean Clarke (yellow card) 41'; Glen McAuley 51'; Kevin Toner (yellow card) 58'; David Webster 84'		Romeo Parkes 23'; Lewis Banks (yellow card) 41'; David Cawley (yellow card) 61'; Romeo Parkes (yellow card) 65'; Edward McGinty (yellow card) 72'	Stadium: Richmond Park; Attendance: 1,217; Referee: John McLoughlin
Note: Rascals Brewery Man of the Match: Jamie Lennon

6 September 2019 Round 30	Finn Harps	1–2	St Patrick's Athletic	Ballybofey, County Donegal
20:00 GMT	Nathan Boyle 33'; Keith Cowan (yellow card) 45'; Mark Coyle (yellow card) 81'		Conor Clifford (yellow card) 26'; Brendan Clarke (yellow card) 37'; Darragh Markey 56'; Rhys McCabe 66'	Stadium: Finn Park; Attendance: 1,054; Referee: John McLoughlin
Note: Originally due to be played on 30 August but was postponed for 7 days due to a failed pitch inspection at Finn Park.

13 September 2019 Round 31	St Patrick's Athletic	0–0	UCD	Inchicore, Dublin 8
19:45 GMT			Harry McEvoy (yellow card) 69'	Stadium: Richmond Park; Attendance: 1,318; Referee: Damien McGrath
Note: Rascals Brewery Man of the Match: Dean Clarke

20 September 2019 Round 32	Shamrock Rovers	0–0	St Patrick's Athletic	Tallaght, Dublin 24
20:00 GMT	Greg Bolger (yellow card) 62'; Lee Grace (yellow card) 90'		Dean Clarke (yellow card) 36'; Darragh Markey (yellow card) 57'; Mikey Drennan (yellow card) 65'; Kevin Toner (yellow card) 80'; Brendan Clarke (yellow card) 87'	Stadium: Tallaght Stadium; Attendance: 4,423; Referee: Rob Harvey

4 October 2019 Round 33	St Patrick's Athletic	0–2	Waterford	Inchicore, Dublin 8
19:45 GMT	Jamie Lennon (yellow card) 57'; Darragh Markey (yellow card) 83'		Michael O'Connor 5' (pen.); Sam Bone (yellow card) 24'; Michael O'Connor 81'	Stadium: Richmond Park; Attendance: 1,400 (Est.); Referee: Edgars Malcevs (Latvia)
Note: Rascals Brewery Man of the Match: Not Announced

18 October 2019 Round 35	St Patrick's Athletic	0–0	Bohemians	Inchicore, Dublin
19:45 GMT	Dean Clarke (yellow card) 36'; David Webster (yellow card) 40'; Cian Coleman (yellow card) 41'		James Finnerty (yellow card) 20'; Aaron Barry (yellow card) 24'; Paddy Kirk (yellow card) 37'; James Finnerty (yellow card) 62' (yellow-red card)	Stadium: Richmond Park; Attendance: 3,022; Referee: Neil Doyle
Note: Rascals Brewery Man of the Match: Chris Forrester; RTÉ Man of the Match: Darragh Markey

22 October 2019 Round 35	Derry City	1–3	St Patrick's Athletic	Derry, Northern Ireland
19:45 GMT	David Parkhouse 53'		Chris Forrester 62'; James Doona 79'; James Doona 82'	Stadium: Ryan McBride Brandywell Stadium; Attendance: 2,300 (Est.); Referee: Paul McLaughlin
Note: Originally due to be played on 11 October but was postponed for 11 days due to international call ups.

25 October 2019 Round 36	Dundalk	4–0	St Patrick's Athletic	Dundalk, County Louth
19:45 GMT	Dane Massey 22'; Patrick Hoban (yellow card) 39'; Daniel Kelly 43'; Brendan Clarke 61' (o.g.); Georgie Kelly 89'		Dean Clarke (yellow card) 58'	Stadium: Oriel Park; Attendance: 3,000 (Est.); Referee: Graham Kelly

=== FAI Cup ===
Win Draw Loss

9 August 2019 First Round	St Patrick's Athletic	2–1	Bray Wanderers	Inchicore, Dublin 8
19:45 GMT	Simon Madden (yellow card) 12'; David Webster 55'; Glen McAuley 75'; Glen McAuley (yellow card) 75'		Paul Keegan (yellow card) 18'; Dean Williams 40'; John Martin (yellow card) 57'	Stadium: Richmond Park; Attendance: 700 (Est.); Referee: Derek Tomney
Note: Rascals Brewery Man of the Match: Glen McAuley

23 August 2019 Second Round	UCD	3–1	St Patrick's Athletic	Belfield, Dublin 4
19:45 GMT	Jack Keaney (yellow card) 6'; Yoyo Mahdy 21'; Liam Kerrigan 27'; Liam Kerrigan 46'; Jack Keaney (yellow card) 89' (red card); Sam Byrne (yellow card) 90'		Glen McAuley (yellow card) 45+1'; Jake Walker (yellow card) 64'; Dean Clarke (yellow card) 67'; Conor Clifford 80'	Stadium: UCD Bowl; Attendance: 585; Referee: Graham Kelly

=== EA Sports Cup ===
Win Draw Loss

1 April 2019 Second Round	St Patrick's Athletic	1–2	Dundalk	Inchicore, Dublin 8
19:45 GMT	James Doona 12'		Georgie Kelly 6'; Dean Jarvis 33'; Dean Jarvis (yellow card) 70'; Georgie Kelly (yellow card) 75'	Stadium: Richmond Park; Attendance: 500 (Est.); Referee: Rob Harvey

=== Europa League ===
Win Draw Loss

==== First qualifying round ====
11 July 2019 1st leg	St Patrick's Athletic (Republic of Ireland)	0–2	(Sweden) IFK Norrköping	Dublin, Republic of Ireland
19:45	Jamie Lennon (yellow card) 13'		Kasper Larsen (yellow card) 24'; Simon Thern 55'; Alexander Fransson (yellow card) 63'; Lee Desmond 85' (o.g.)	Stadium: Richmond Park; Attendance: 2,800 (Est.); Referee: Lionel Tschudi (Switzerland)
Note: Capacity of Richmond Park reduced to 2,800 due to UEFA regulations on standing areas being used during UEFA Europa League matches.

18 July 2019 2nd leg	IFK Norrköping (Sweden)	2–1	(Republic of Ireland) St Patrick's Athletic	Norrköping, Sweden
20:00 (Local Time)	Jordan Larsson 36'; Rasmus Lauritsen (yellow card) 37'; Filip Dagerstål (yellow card) 73'; Kalle Holmberg 85'		Conor Clifford (yellow card) 41'; David Webster (yellow card) 54'; Conor Clifford 72'; Ciaran Kelly (yellow card) 73'; Kevin Toner (yellow card) 75'; Ciaran Kelly (yellow card) 89' (yellow-red card)	Stadium: Nya Parken; Attendance: 5,925; Referee: Dejan Jakimovski (North Macedonia)

=== Leinster Senior Cup ===
Win Draw Loss

18 February 2019 Fourth round	St Patrick's Athletic	3–0	Wexford	Inchicore, Dublin 8
19:45 GMT	Chris Forrester 56'; Jake Walker 58'; Paul Cleary 90+2'		Nika Arevadze (yellow card) 65'; Lee Costello (yellow card) 70'; Paddy Cahill (yellow card) 75'	Stadium: Richmond Park; Attendance: 250 (Est.)

15 September 2019 Quarter-final	Cabinteely	0–1	St Patrick's Athletic	Blackrock, Dublin 4
15:30 GMT	Cian Lynch (yellow card) 47'; Kieran Butler (yellow card) 69'		Gary Shaw 44'; Cian Coleman (yellow card) 69'; James Doona (yellow card) 71'	Stadium: Stradbrook Road; Attendance: 150 (Est.); Referee: Alan Patchell

1 November 2019 Semi-final	Sheriff YC	1–3 (a.e.t.)	St Patrick's Athletic	Clontarf, Dublin 3
19:45 GMT	Paul Murphy (yellow card) 40'; Leon Hayes 63'; Adam McMahon (yellow card) 92'; Paul Murphy (red card) 113'; Stephen Murphy (red card) 113'; Anthony Flood (yellow card) 113'; Anthony Flood (yellow card) 120+1' (red card)		Cian Kelly (yellow card) 38'; Darragh Burns (yellow card) 55'; Daniel Dobbin 61'; Kyle Robinson (yellow card) 105'; Kyle Robinson 113'; Kian Corbally 118'	Stadium: Clontarf All Weather; Attendance: 250 (Est.)

16 November 2019 Final	St Patrick's Athletic	4–0	Athlone Town	Inchicore, Dublin 8
15:00 GMT	Jamie Whelan (yellow card) 17'; Kyle Robinson 33'; Brandon Holt 55'; Jake Walker (yellow card) 63'; Jake Walker 76'; Brandon Holt (yellow card) 79'; Daniel Dobbin 87'		Ciaran Grogan (yellow card) 80'	Stadium: Richmond Park; Attendance: 500 (Est.); Referee: Alan Patchell
Note: Rescheduled from 13 November due to unplayable pitch LFA Man of the Match: Kyle Robinson

=== Friendlies ===
Win Draw Loss

==== Preseason ====
12 January 2019	Wexford	0–3	St Patrick's Athletic	Carlow, County Carlow
14:00 GMT			Gary Shaw 64'; Trialist 86'; Mikey Drennan 87'	Stadium: IT Carlow; Attendance: 100 (Est.)

19 January 2019	St Patrick's Athletic	4–1	Cobh Ramblers	Celbridge, County Kildare
14:00 GMT	Cian Coleman 1'; Mikey Drennan 5'; Mikey Drennan 24'; Gary Shaw 47'		Jaze Kabia 87'	Stadium: Ballyoulster United F.C. Attendance: 150 (Est.); Referee: Paul Tuite

25 January 2019	St Patrick's Athletic	3–0	Bray Wanderers	Blanchardstown, Dublin 15
19:30 GMT	Sean Heaney 23' (o.g.); Gary Shaw 44'; Nika Kalandarishvili 80'			Stadium: FAI National Training Centre; Attendance: 100 (Est.)

29 January 2019	FAI ETB	0–6	St Patrick's Athletic	Ringsend, Dublin 4
13:30 GMT			Caoimhin Fowler 26'; Caoimhin Fowler 41'; Caoimhin Fowler 57'; James Doona 61'; Conor Clifford 64'; James Doona 90'	Stadium: Irishtown Stadium; Attendance: 50 (Est.)

1 February 2019	Shelbourne	0–3	St Patrick's Athletic	Clonshaugh, Dublin 17
19:30 GMT			Mikey Drennan 35'; Mikey Drennan 40'; Mikey Drennan 75'	Stadium: AUL Complex; Attendance: 100 (Est.)

5 February 2019	Athlone Town	0–3	St Patrick's Athletic	Drumcondra, Dublin 3
19:30 GMT	Darren Meenan (yellow card) 53'		Gary Shaw 80'; Dean Clarke 86'; Mikey Drennan 87'	Stadium: Dublin Port Stadium; Attendance: 50 (Est.)

8 February 2019	St Patrick's Athletic	0–0	Drogheda United	Inchicore, Dublin 8
19:45 GMT	Kevin Toner (yellow card); Rhys McCabe (yellow card)		Thomas Byrne (yellow card)	Stadium: Richmond Park; Attendance: 350 (Est.)

==== Mid-season ====
13 July 2019	St Patrick's Athletic	0–4	Chelsea	Inchicore, Dublin 8
14:00 GMT			Mason Mount 15'; Emerson 31'; Olivier Giroud 67'; Andreas Christensen (yellow card) 81'; Olivier Giroud 88'	Stadium: Richmond Park; Attendance: 5,340; Referee: Paul McLaughlin
