= David Webster (footballer) =

Irish footballer (born 1990)

Personal information
- Date of birth: 9 August 1989 (age 37)
- Place of birth: Firhouse, Dublin, Ireland
- Position: Defender

Youth career
- Bray Wanderers

Senior career*
Years	Team	Apps	(Gls)
2008–2014	Bray Wanderers	143	(3)
2015–2017	Shamrock Rovers	72	(0)
2018	Waterford	28	(0)
2019	St Patrick's Athletic	24	(1)
2020–2022	Finn Harps	55	(2)
2023	Bray Wanderers	15	(0)
2024	Drogheda United	19	(0)
- * Club domestic league appearances and goals

David Webster (born 7 April 1990) is an Irish former professional footballer that played in the League of Ireland for Bray Wanderers (over two spells), Shamrock Rovers, Waterford, St Patrick's Athletic, Finn Harps and Drogheda United.

== Club career ==
=== Bray Wanderers ===
Webster came through Bray Wanderers youth setup and signed a contract with Eddie Gormley's first team squad in February 2008 whilst still playing for the reserve side in the A Championship. His first senior appearance for the club came on 5 May 2008 when he came on as a substitute for Paddy Kavanagh with 9 minutes left of a 1–0 win over Shamrock Rovers at the Carlisle Grounds in the League Cup. His only other appearance that season came on 16 July 2008 when he started in a friendly against English League One side Millwall, in a 1–0 loss for Wanderers.

The 2009 season proved to be Webster's breakthrough season in senior football as he became an established regular at centre back for Bray. The first goal of his career came on 14 August 2009 when he scored in a 2–0 win over Tralee Dynamos in the FAI Cup. Webster's first League of Ireland goal came on 19 September 2009 when he opened the scoring in the 16th minute in a vital league game against Shamrock Rovers at Tallaght Stadium as his side fought to fight off relegation. Bray ended the season bottom of the table and lost out to Sporting Fingal in the final of the promotion/relegation playoffs meaning they would be relegated to the League of Ireland First Division however they kept their top flight status as Cork City and Derry City were both expelled from the League of Ireland Premier Division for financial reasons.

It was a mixed season for Webster and Bray in 2010 as they were runners up in the Leinster Senior Cup but again struggled to fight off relegation, taking them right up until the Promotion Relegation Playoff final as they beat Monaghan United 7–6 on penalties to defy all odds and stay up once again. During the season he also had the opportunity to play against top sides like Middlesbrough and Villarreal, featuring some members of the 2010 World Cup winning Spain side.

Webster only managed 19 appearances the following season in 2011 which was not helped by injuries but it was a successful season for the team as they finished in a respectable 6th place earning 51 points and qualifying for the following season's Setanta Sports Cup.

The club's stay in the 2012 Setanta Sports Cup was short lived however as they were knocked out by Glentoran at the first hurdle with Webster featuring in both games. Webster featured in 27 games over the course of the season as his side once again stayed out of the Playoffs as they finished a comfortable 5 points ahead of Dundalk.

Two more seasons of relegation battles followed for Webster and Bray as they beat Longford Town in the final of the 2013 Playoffs, before avoiding the playoffs in 2014 by a single point ahead of UCD.

=== Shamrock Rovers ===
It was announced on 26 November 2014 that Webster had been signed by Shamrock Rovers manager Pat Fenlon on a two-year contract, alongside Gavin Brennan, Barry Murphy and Craig Hyland. Webster was a mainstay in defence for Rovers in his first season as he featured in 30 games in all competitions, including all 4 UEFA Europa League games against Progrès Niederkorn of Luxembourg (in which he scored in the home leg) and Odds BK of Norway.

The 2016 season was a poor one for Webster and Rovers as they were embarrassing beaten 5–0 at home in the FAI Cup Quarter Final, knocked out at the first hurdle of the UEFA Europa League to RoPS of Finland (Webster playing in neither leg) and in the league they finished 4th, a massive 22 points off champions Dundalk.

The poor form in the previous season resulted in Pat Fenlon being sacked by the club but his replacement Stephen Bradley offered Webster a new contract which he signed on 29 November 2016. Bradley showed a lot of faith in Webster over the season, playing him a total of 39 times across all competitions including all 4 UEFA Europa League games as the Hoops knocked out Iceland's Stjarnan before being beaten twice by FK Mladá Boleslav of the Czech Republic, in a season which they finished in 3rd place in the league as well as being runners up in the 2017 League of Ireland Cup to Dundalk, who also knocked them out of the FAI Cup, after a Semi-final replay at Tallaght Stadium.

On 14 November 2017 it was announced that Rovers would not be offering Webster or Ryan Connolly a new contract for 2018.

=== Waterford ===
After 95 appearances for Rovers in all competitions, Webster signed for newly promoted Waterford under manager Alan Reynolds on 29 November 2017. Webster played a total of 31 times for the Blues as they finished in 4th place, securing a UEFA Europa League place for the following season as they finished 9 points ahead of nearest challengers St Patrick's Athletic.

=== St Patrick's Athletic ===
On 14 November 2018, it was announced that had signed for Dublin club St Patrick's Athletic, becoming new manager Harry Kenny's second signing. Upon signing, Webster sited one of his reasons for joining the Saints being that he was at a stage of his career in which he wanted to win medals. He made his debut for the club in a 1–0 win over Cork City on 15 February 2019, the opening night of the season. During the season, it was announced that Pat's would be playing UEFA Europa League football at the expense of his old club Waterford after they failed to meet UEFA's '3 year rule'.

=== Finn Harps ===
Webster was announced as having signed for Finn Harps on a one-year deal on 28 December 2019.

=== Return to Bray Wanderers ===
On 30 November 2022, Webster re-signed for League of Ireland First Division side Bray Wanderers after 8 years away from the club. On 8 February 2023, Webster was named as club captain for the upcoming season.

=== Drogheda United ===
On 2 February 2024, it was announced that Webster had returned to the League of Ireland Premier Division, signing for Drogheda United after impressing on a month long trial period. Webster made 27 appearances in all competitions for the club over the season, including the 2024 FAI Cup final and the 2024 League of Ireland Premier Division Promotion/Relegation Playoff, both of which his side won, in what were the final two games of his career as he retired with a total of 429 appearances and 9 goals over his career.

== Personal life ==
His cousin is retired professional footballer Eoin Doyle.

== Career statistics ==
As of match played on 16 November 2024

Appearances and goals by club, season and competition
Club	Season	League			FAI Cup		League Cup		Europe		Other		Total	
Club	Season	Division	Apps	Goals	Apps	Goals	Apps	Goals	Apps	Goals	Apps	Goals	Apps	Goals
Bray Wanderers	2008	LOI Premier Division	0	0	1	0	0	0	—		—		1	0
Bray Wanderers	2009	LOI Premier Division	28	1	2	1	1	0	—		0	0	31	2
Bray Wanderers	2010	LOI Premier Division	25	0	3	0	2	0	—		4 (Note: 3 appearances in Leinster Senior Cup, 1 appearance in League of Ireland promotion/relegation playoffs)	0	34	0
Bray Wanderers	2011	LOI Premier Division	18	1	0	0	1	0	—		0	0	19	1
Bray Wanderers	2012	LOI Premier Division	21	1	2	0	2	0	—		2 (Note: Appearances in Setanta Sports Cup)	0	27	1
Bray Wanderers	2013	LOI Premier Division	30	0	1	0	1	0	—		2 (Note: Appearances in League of Ireland promotion/relegation playoffs)	0	34	0
Bray Wanderers	2014	LOI Premier Division	21	0	1	0	2	0	—		1 (Note: Appearances in Leinster Senior Cup)	0	25	0
Bray Wanderers	Total		143	3	10	1	9	0	—		9	0	171	4
Shamrock Rovers	2015	LOI Premier Division	24	0	0	0	1	0	4 (Note: Appearances in UEFA Europa League)	1	1	0	30	1
Shamrock Rovers	2016	LOI Premier Division	21	0	2	0	2	0	0	0	1	0	26	0
Shamrock Rovers	2017	LOI Premier Division	27	0	4	0	4	0	4	0	0	0	39	0
Shamrock Rovers	Total		72	0	6	0	7	0	8	1	2	0	95	1
Waterford	2018	LOI Premier Division	28	0	2	0	1	0	—		0 (Note: Appearances in Munster Senior Cup)	0	31	0
St Patrick's Athletic	2019	LOI Premier Division	24	1	2	1	1	0	0	0	1	0	28	2
Finn Harps	2020	LOI Premier Division	16	1	3	0	—		—		—		19	1
Finn Harps	2021	LOI Premier Division	30	1	2	0	—		—		—		32	1
Finn Harps	2022	LOI Premier Division	9	0	0	0	—		—		—		9	0
Finn Harps	Total		55	2	5	0	—		—		—		60	2
Bray Wanderers	2023	LOI First Division	15	0	1	0	—		—		1	0	17	0
Drogheda United	2024	LOI Premier Division	19	0	5	0	—		—		3 (Note: 2 appearances in the Leinster Senior Cup & 1 appearance in the 2024 League of Ireland Premier Division Promotion/Relegation Playoff)	0	27	0
Career Total			356	6	32	2	18	0	8	1	16	0	429	9

== Honours ==
Drogheda United

- FAI Cup: 2024
