= Marc Kenny =

Irish footballer

Personal information
- Date of birth: 17 September 1973 (age 53)
- Place of birth: Dublin, Ireland
- Position: Midfielder

Youth career
- 1984–1991: Home Farm

Senior career*
Years	Team	Apps	(Gls)
1991–1993	Liverpool	0	(0)
1993–1995	Bangor	32	(6)
1995–1996	Glenavon	6	(0)
1996–2003	Shamrock Rovers	162	(26)
2003	Kildare County	11	(2)
2004	Shamrock Rovers	5	(0)
2004	Dublin City	14	(1)
2005	Monaghan United	15	(0)
2005	Shamrock Rovers	14	(0)
Total		259	(35)

International career
1990	Republic of Ireland U17	1	(0)
- * Club domestic league appearances and goals

Marc Kenny (born 17 September 1973) is an Irish former footballer.

== Career ==
Kenny was captain of the Home Farm schoolboys team that got into the Guinness Book of Records for going six seasons without a defeat.

A Republic of Ireland national under-17 football team international after three seasons at Liverpool he came home to play three seasons in the Irish League with Bangor and Glenavon

He made his League of Ireland debut for Shamrock Rovers at Finn Harps on 12 October 1996.

A week later he scored on his full debut against Bohs in a 3–2 victory in Tolka Park.

He scored a memorable free kick against Celtic in July 1998.

Kenny left Rovers before the 2005 League of Ireland season.

His last League of Ireland game was at Tolka Park in November 2005 as Rovers were relegated for the first time in their history.

A tremendous free kick taker, Marc's connections to Rovers went back much further as older brother Harry Kenny spent 13 seasons at the club. Another brother, Dave, a free scoring left footed winger who played his football with Railway Union FC & Ashtown Villa FC in the Leinster Senior League.

Marc now coaches St. Mochta's in the Leinster Senior League (soccer).

Kenny played in the 1990 UEFA European Under-16 Football Championship qualifiers and the 1992 UEFA European Under-18 Football Championship qualifiers.

His first European game was for Bangor against APOEL in the 1993-94 European Cup Winners' Cup. His free kick led to Bangor's opener. In the second leg his corner led to Mark Glendinning's finish in Cyprus.

He was the only Glenavon player carded in the clash at Werder Bremen in the 1995-96 UEFA Cup.

For Rovers his free kick led to Derek Tracey's goal at Altayspor in the 1998 UEFA Intertoto Cup. In the home leg he was sent off.
