= Mikey Drennan =

Irish footballer

Personal information
- Full name: Michael Joseph Drennan
- Date of birth: 2 February 1994 (age 32)
- Place of birth: Kilkenny, Ireland
- Height: 1.77 m (5 ft 10 in)
- Position: Forward

Youth career
- Evergreen
- 2010–2011: Aston Villa

Senior career*
Years	Team	Apps	(Gls)
2011–2015	Aston Villa	0	(0)
2014	→ Carlisle United (loan)	6	(0)
2014	→ Portsmouth (loan)	14	(3)
2015–2016	Shamrock Rovers	37	(12)
2017	Evergreen		
2018	Sligo Rovers	13	(6)
2019	St Patrick's Athletic	26	(6)
2020	Evergreen		

International career
2010	Republic of Ireland U16		
2010	Republic of Ireland U17	3	(1)
2012	Republic of Ireland U19	3	(4)
2014–2016	Republic of Ireland U21	2	(0)
- * Club domestic league appearances and goals

Michael Joseph Drennan (born 2 February 1994) is an Irish former professional footballer who played as a striker.

Drennan represented the Republic of Ireland at youth level and won the Football Association of Ireland's Under-16 International Player of the Year in 2010. Drennan was scouted by then Premier League side Aston Villa and spent five years in their youth and reserve sides where he was loaned out to English Football League sides Carlisle United and Portsmouth. He returned to Ireland, playing for Shamrock Rovers, local side Evergreen, Sligo Rovers and St Patrick's Athletic.

== Career ==
=== English Football ===
==== Aston Villa ====
Born in Kilkenny, Drennan began his career in hometown's Evergreen FC, playing for the youth side until before moving to Aston Villa in June 2010, after being tracked by Villa and Manchester City since January. In his first season, he impressed for the academy side, scoring ten goals (also one with the Reserves), and signed a professional deal in March of the following year.

Drennan appeared 13 times for the reserves in 2011–12 season, also appearing four times in the NextGen Series and scoring a brace against Rosenborg. In the 2012–13 season, he played a key part for the Reserves both in U21 Development League and in NextGen Series, also being the second top goalscorer for the NextGen, despite being injured for the latter stages of the tournament. His foot injury (suffered in a NextGen game against Ajax), kept him sidelined for nine months.

===== Carlisle United Loan =====
On 17 January 2014 Drennan joined Carlisle United on a one-month youth loan deal, and made his debut as a substitute in a 2–4 home loss to Colchester United the following day. He returned to Villa in February after appearing six times for Carlisle, starting in three matches.

===== Portsmouth Loan =====
On 21 February 2014, Drennan joined League Two side Portsmouth on a one-month loan. Drennan scored on his league debut in a 5–1 defeat against Scunthorpe United on 22 February 2014. On 24 March 2014, Drennan extended his loan stay with Pompey for the remainder of the 2013–14 season.

=== Return to Ireland ===
==== Shamrock Rovers ====
On 30 January 2015, Drennan returned to his home country, signing for League of Ireland side, Shamrock Rovers on a two-year deal. His first season saw him score 12 goals in 35 games across all competitions, including his first appearances in the UEFA Europa League.

==== Time Out Of Professional Football ====
In 2016 Drennan took a break from football with depression, taking work in his native Kilkenny and playing for the local hurling side James Stephens GAA and local junior football side Evergreen where he began his career, he stated he might return to Shamrock Rovers in January 2017. However, Drennan continued playing for Evergreen on their run to the FAI Junior Cup final, including a goal in the quarter-final against Kilmallock.

==== Sligo Rovers ====
Drennan returned to professional football on 13 June 2018, signing for Sligo Rovers under manager Gerard Lyttle. Drennan scored an impressive 9 goals in 17 appearances in all competitions, including a hattrick against Livingston in the Scottish Challenge Cup.

==== St Patrick's Athletic ====
On 12 December 2018, it was announced that Drennan had signed a 2-year contract with Dublin club St Patrick's Athletic, alongside former teammate Brandon Miele. He started off life at the Saints in excellent form, scoring the winner on his debut at home to Cork City, as well as scoring an injury time winner in his second game, away to his former club Sligo Rovers. On 29 March 2019, he was shown a straight red card against Bohemians for making comments to the referee after a soft free kick was given against him, he was suspended for 3 games as a result. Drennan's sixth goal of the season came on 26 April 2019, this proved to be his last goal of the season as he went on a disappointing 19 game goal drought across all competitions until the end of the season. Drennan featured in both legs of his sides UEFA Europa League tie against Swedish side IFK Norrköping. On 27 July, Drennan received another straight red card for making comments to the referee following a free kick being given against his side. This saw him receive a 4 match suspension. It was announced on 6 November 2019 that Drennan had been released from his contract a year early by new Saints manager Stephen O'Donnell, having failed to impress him during his 7 games in charge.

==== Return to Evergreen ====
Drennan left the professional game again in January 2020, opting to sign for his local Kilkenny side Evergreen once again.

== Career statistics ==
Professional appearances – correct as of 31 October 2019.

Club	Division	Season	League		National Cup		League Cup		Europe		Other		Total	
Club	Division	Season	Apps	Goals	Apps	Goals	Apps	Goals	Apps	Goals	Apps	Goals	Apps	Goals
Aston Villa	Premier League	2013–14	0	0	0 (Note: Appearances in FA Cup)	0	0 (Note: Appearances in EFL Cup)	0	—		—		0	0
Aston Villa	Premier League	2014–15	0	0	0	0	0	0	—		—		0	0
Carlisle United (loan)	EFL League One	2013–14	6	0	0	0	0	0	—		0 (Note: Appearances in EFL Trophy)	0	6	0
Portsmouth (loan)	EFL League Two	2013–14	10	3	0	0	0	0	—		0	0	10	3
Portsmouth (loan)	EFL League Two	2014–15	4	0	0	0	0	0	—		0	0	4	0
Portsmouth (loan)	Portsmouth Total		14	3	0	0	0	0	—		0	0	14	3
Shamrock Rovers	League of Ireland Premier Division	2015	29	12	1 (Note: Appearances in FAI Cup)	0	1 (Note: Appearances in League of Ireland Cup)	0	4 (Note: Appearances in UEFA Europa League)	0	0 (Note: Appearances in Leinster Senior Cup)	0	35	12
Shamrock Rovers	League of Ireland Premier Division	2016	8	0	0	0	0	0	0	0	0	0	8	0
Shamrock Rovers	Shamrock Rovers Total		37	12	1	0	1	0	4	0	0	0	43	12
Sligo Rovers	League of Ireland Premier Division	2018	13	6	1	0	1	0	—		2 (Note: Appearances in Scottish Challenge Cup)	3	17	9
St Patrick's Athletic	League of Ireland Premier Division	2019	26	6	0	0	1	0	2	0	1	0	30	6
Career Total			96	27	2	0	3	0	6	0	3	3	110	30

== Honours ==
=== Club ===
Aston Villa Under-19s

- NextGen Series: 2012–13 (1)

Aston Villa Reserves

- Premier Reserve League South: 2011–12 (1)

=== Individual ===
- FAI Under-16 International Player of the Year (1): 2010
