= Brandon Miele =

Irish footballer

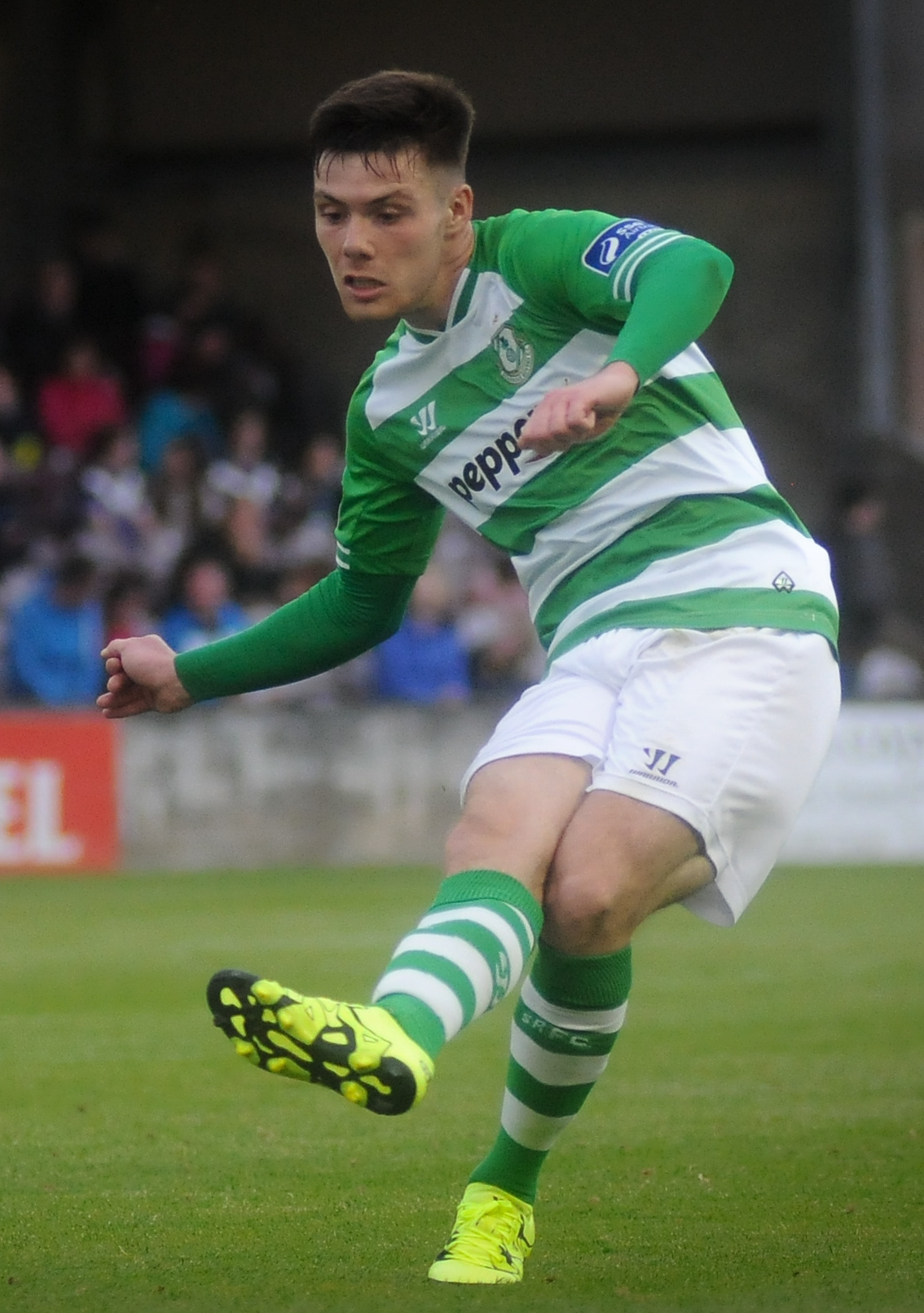
- Miele in 2015

Personal information
- Date of birth: 28 August 1994 (age 32)
- Place of birth: Tallaght, Ireland
- Position: Midfielder

Youth career
- Cherry Orchard
- 2010–2014: Newcastle United
- 2014: Bluebell United

Senior career*
Years	Team	Apps	(Gls)
2015–2018	Shamrock Rovers	113	(32)
2019	St Patrick's Athletic	7	(0)

International career
2012–2013	Republic of Ireland U19	6	(0)
2015–2016	Republic of Ireland U21	2	(0)
- * Club domestic league appearances and goals as of 17:30, 12 January 2022 (UTC)

Brandon Miele (born 28 August 1994) is an Irish former professional footballer. A midfielder, he last played for League of Ireland Premier Division club St Patrick's Athletic, having previously played for his first senior club Shamrock Rovers for four years.

== Club career ==
=== Youth career ===
Miele started out playing schoolboy football with Dublin club Cherry Orchard. After impressing for The Orchard, he was signed by Premier League club Newcastle United in 2010. He made his way through the ranks right up to reserve team level. He had a successful time at underage level for the club, with Miele and Newcastle clinching the tier two title and also winning the Premier Academy Group D at under-18's level. After four years at the club without being given an opportunity at first-team level, he left the club and returned home. During his time at Newcastle he played with included Rolando Aarons, Adam Campbell, Nile Ranger, Jamie Sterry, Jak Alnwick, Curtis Good, Romain Amalfitano, Mehdi Abeid, Marcus Maddison, Freddie Woodman, Adam Armstrong and Lee Desmond among others. He signed for Leinster Senior League side Bluebell United on his return, to keep fit before leaving the club a few days before Christmas 2014 when he returned to professional football by signing for League of Ireland Premier Division side Shamrock Rovers, from his hometown of Tallaght.

=== Shamrock Rovers ===
==== 2015 season ====
On 23 December 2014, it was announced that Miele had signed for Pat Fenlon's Shamrock Rovers side, on the same day that it was announced that ex-Ireland international Stephen McPhail had signed a new contract at the club. Miele's debut in senior football came on 3 April 2015, when he came on from the bench in the 84th minute and in injury time he scored the third goal in a 3–0 win over Galway United at Tallaght Stadium. The season turned out to be a huge success for Miele, scoring 11 league goals in 28 league games, he also played in all four of Rovers' UEFA Europa League campaign as they knocked out Luxembourg side Progrès Niederkorn before being knocked out by Odds BK of Norway. This form saw him voted into the PFAI Team of the Year by his fellow professionals as well as being voted the PFAI Players' Player of the Year and Shamrock Rovers Player of the Year.

==== 2016 season ====
The 2016 season saw Miele score nine goals in 30 league games as Rovers finished fourth and qualified for Europe again. The season was a disappointment for the club however, as well as finishing 22 points off champions Dundalk, they lost 5–0 at home to Cork City in the FAI Cup and were knocked out of the UEFA Europa League at the first hurdle by RoPS of Finland 4–1 on aggregate, with Miele playing in both games. This poor form saw manager Pat Fenlon replaced by Stephen Bradley on 3 July.

==== 2017 season ====
Rovers finished 2017 once again 22 points off first place but improved their league position, finishing in third place as well as making it to an FAI Cup Semi-final Replay and League of Ireland Cup Final, losing both to Dundalk. Miele was named as League of Ireland Player of the Month for September 2017 after scoring a goal against Cork City, another against Finn Harps as well as a hat-trick in the FAI Cup against his former side Bluebell United. Miele again played in every European game for Rovers as they knocked out Stjarnan of Iceland before losing to Mladá Boleslav of the Czech Republic. In all competitions, Miele played in 41 games, scoring 16 goals.

==== 2018 season ====
Miele signed a new two-year contract at Rovers on 17 November 2017. The season turned out to be a disappointment for Miele, as he played 29 games in all competitions, scoring three goals but just 15 of those appearances were starts in the league and he played no part in Rovers' narrow 2–1 aggregate loss to Swedish side AIK.

=== St Patrick's Athletic ===
Despite having a year left on his Rovers contract, it was announced on 12 December 2018 that Miele, along with former Rovers' teammate Mikey Drennan had signed a two-year contract with Dublin rivals St Patrick's Athletic where he would play with former Newcastle United teammate Lee Desmond. He made his debut on 15 February 2019 in a 1–0 win over Cork City on the opening day of the season at Richmond Park. Miele did not train with the club since the beginning of May and tendered his resignation on 6 June 2019 which was accepted. He made 8 appearances for the club in total.

=== Doping Ban ===
In January 2020, Miele was banned from football for two years following a doping violation. The offence was 'refusing or failing' to submit a full sample following a match between St Patrick's Athletic and Sligo Rovers in April 2019. A joint statement from Sport Ireland and the FAI stated that Miele had "committed a violation of Article 2.3 by not submitting to Sample collection after notification and did not have a compelling justification for doing so."

Miele released his own statement via the PFAI, stating "On 19 April 2019, while an unused substitute for St Patrick's Athletic, in a match against Sligo Rovers, I was selected randomly to do a post-match drugs test. As I had already urinated twice over the course of the match, I found it difficult to provide a sample. While trying to do so, I was informed by my partner, Sinead, that my daughter had fallen and hit her head. Over a period of two hours while attempting to comply with the requirements of the testers, my partner became increasingly concerned about the health of my daughter and contacted me continuously to ask me to return to care for her. While some confusion arose as to whether or not she had been brought to hospital, it became apparent to me that it would be necessary to leave the testing centre to be with my daughter, who has a history of health problems in her short life to date, including one period of intensive care detention.

"After two hours of trying everything to provide a sample including drinking copious amounts and walking on cold floors in bare feet, I was only able to provide a partial sample. I had reached such a state of agitation and confusion as a result of my daughter's health at this point that I felt I must leave to be with her. I was not aware at the time of the consequences of leaving at this juncture but felt my first obligation was to my family.

"I am pleased that, in spite of the decision, the tribunal fully accepted my honest attempts to cooperate and indeed found that "all four witnesses called on behalf of Sport Ireland were of the view that Mr Miele acted in a sincere and fully cooperative manner at all times and took the decision that he had to be there for his family" and "genuinely believed that Mr Miele was agitated and upset and concerned about the health of his daughter."

"The panel reached the conclusion that Sinead and I are 'caring and responsible parents who regard as paramount the health and well being of their young daughter....the failure to provide a sample (after a two hour period) was driven by Mr Miele's desire to be with his family and daughter and does not in the opinion of the panel constitute a manifest disregard of the potential anti-doping violation.

"While I do not regret my decision to prioritise my daughter's health, I do regret that the effect this has had. Ultimately, I have to take responsibility for my actions that night but I do feel that I was placed in an impossible position. I believe that many people would have followed a similar course.

"I was not sufficiently aware of the rules or penalties that follow a failure to provide a full sample. I do believe that the sanction of two years is very severe having regard to the dilemma I faced and having regard to lesser bans for people who have been found guilty of taking a banned substance but I must accept the decision of the tribunal.

"I realise that I have the option to appeal but given the possibility of an even longer ban and my desire to put this episode behind me, I do not intend to do so.

"For the avoidance of any doubt, I did not at that time take, and have never taken, any banned substances. Although I feel that the punishment that I am facing is particularly harsh, I hope that this will serve as a lesson to all other footballers and sportspeople who are faced with giving a sample. I hope they never face the choice I had but my experience is such that I would advise everyone now facing such a situation that not giving a sample should be the very last resort and every conceivable effort should be made.

"I would like to thank my family for their support and for the assistance of the PFA Ireland who have provided professional and legal advice throughout the process with particular thanks to Stephen McGuinness, Stuart Gilhooly and Patrick Marron B.L."

== International career ==
Miele has Italian family roots, with his paternal grandfather from the village of Cassino and Benevento outside Naples. He has played at various underage levels for Ireland, making his Republic of Ireland U21 debut against Norway U21 on 17 November 2015, a 0–0 draw at the RSC in Waterford.

== Career statistics ==
As of 10 December 2020

Appearances and goals by club, season and competition
Club	Season	League			FAI Cup		League of Ireland Cup		Europe		Other		Total	
Club	Season	Division	Apps	Goals	Apps	Goals	Apps	Goals	Apps	Goals	Apps	Goals	Apps	Goals
Shamrock Rovers	2015	LOI Premier Division	28	11	1	0	3	1	4 (Note: Appearances in UEFA Europa League)	0	0 (Note: Appearances in Leinster Senior Cup)	0	36	12
Shamrock Rovers	2016	LOI Premier Division	30	9	2	2	2	0	2	0	0	0	36	11
Shamrock Rovers	2017	LOI Premier Division	29	9	4	5	4	2	4	0	0	0	41	16
Shamrock Rovers	2018	LOI Premier Division	26	3	1	0	1	0	0	0	1	0	29	3
Shamrock Rovers	Total		113	32	8	7	10	3	10	0	1	0	142	42
St Patrick's Athletic	2019	LOI Premier Division	7	0	0	0	0	0	0	0	1	0	8	0
Career total			120	32	8	7	10	3	10	0	2	0	150	42

== Honours ==
Individual

- PFAI Young Player of the Year: 2015
- PFAI Team of the Year: 2015
- League of Ireland Player of the Month: September 2017
- Shamrock Rovers Player of the Year: 2015
