= Gary Shaw (Irish footballer) =

Irish footballer (born 1992)

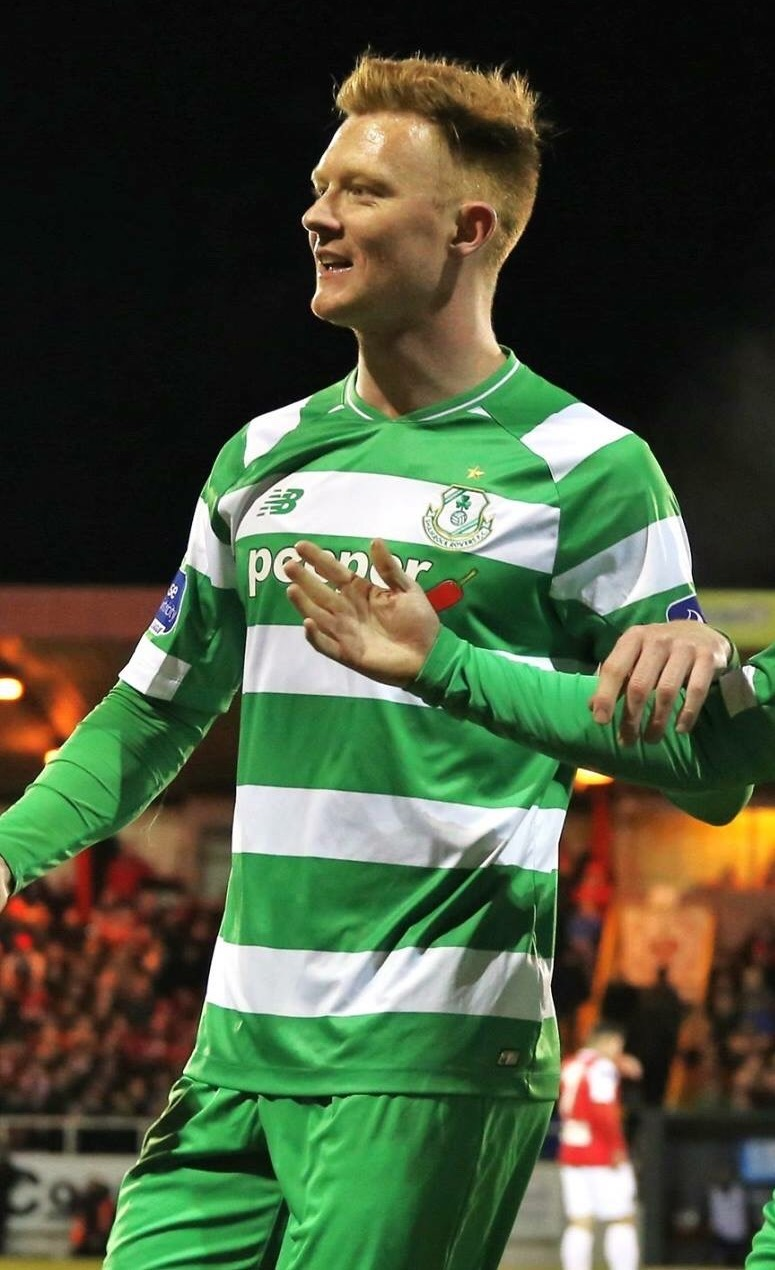
- Shaw with Shamrock Rovers in 2016

Personal information
- Date of birth: 10 May 1992 (age 34)
- Place of birth: Newbridge, Ireland
- Position: Forward

Youth career
- 2006–2010: Newbridge Town

Senior career*
Years	Team	Apps	(Gls)
2010–2011	Bray Wanderers	14	(4)
2012–2015	Longford Town	105	(25)
2016–2018	Shamrock Rovers	78	(20)
2019	St Patrick's Athletic	29	(1)
2020–2021	Bray Wanderers	37	(13)

International career
2011	Republic of Ireland U19		
- * Club domestic league appearances and goals as of 14:57, 14 December 2021 (UTC)

Gary Shaw (born 10 May 1992) is an Irish professional footballer. He has previously played for Longford Town, Shamrock Rovers, St Patrick's Athletic and Bray Wanderers.

== Club career ==
=== Youth career ===
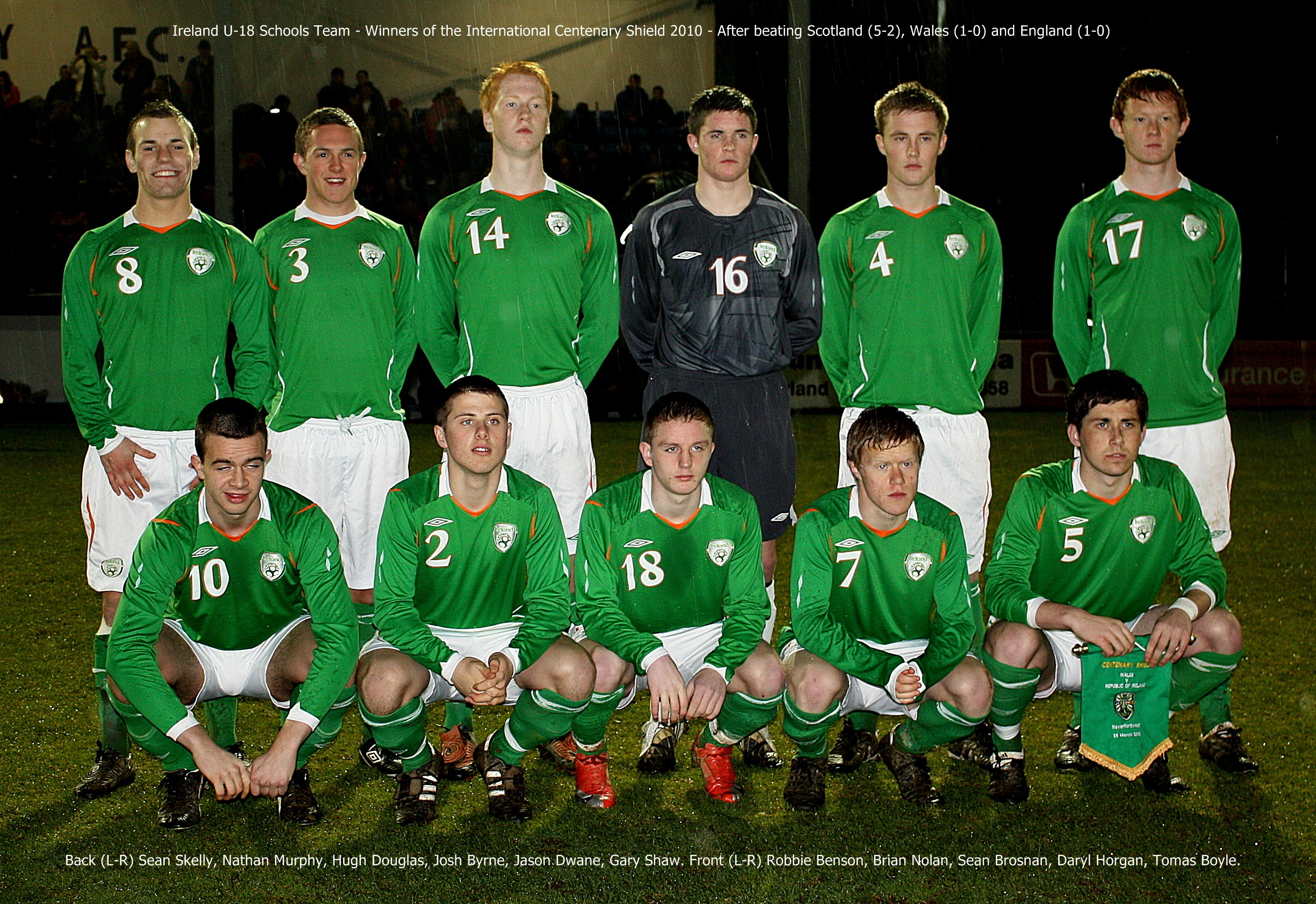
Shaw (number 17) with the Irish Schools Team in 2010.

A native of Newbridge, County Kildare, Shaw started out playing for his local side Newbridge Town at underage level. A prolific goalscorer, he was soon promoted to the first team before catching the eye of Shamrock Rovers who invited him to play as a guest in the 2009 SuperCupNI, an international youth tournament held in Northern Ireland and known then as the Milk Cup. It was contested by teams from all around the world and has been won in the past by the likes of Liverpool, Barcelona, Tottenham and Manchester United. Although Rovers failed to progress beyond the group stages, Shaw did score in Rovers' victory over Mexican side Cruz Azul.

=== Bray Wanderers ===
Shaw signed for Bray Wanderers in August 2010, scoring on his debut in a 2–0 win away to Dundalk on 3 September 2010. He went on to make 11 appearances in all competitions, scoring 3 goals. He featured in all three games in the League of Ireland promotion/relegation playoffs as Bray managed to stay up by beating Monaghan United on penalties.

The 2011 season was one to forget for Shaw however, as he broke the same metatarsal bone twice, resulting in only 8 appearances across all competitions, scoring 1 goal.

=== Longford Town ===
Shaw signed for League of Ireland First Division side Longford Town on 2 January 2012. His first season with the midlands club was a success as he returned from his long spell out injured to make 23 appearances, scoring 5 goals as Longford reached the playoffs which Shaw missed through injury as his side were defeated 3–1 on aggregate by Waterford.

The 2013 season was a similar story for Shaw and Longford as he finished up with 3 goals in 32 games in all competitions with Town going all the way to the Playoff Finals but were unfortunately once again beaten, this time by Shaw's old club Bray Wanderers who won 5–4 on aggregate with a late winner.

Fortunately for Shaw and Longford, 2014 turned out to be a brilliant year for both. He scored 16 goals in 34 appearances across all competitions as Town won the league title, the first silverware of Shaw's career. Longford were also runners up to St Patrick's Athletic in the 2014 Leinster Senior Cup and Shaw himself was voted on to the PFAI First Division Team of the Year by his fellow players. He was also voted Players' Player of the Year by his teammates at Longford.

Even with Longford now newly promoted to the League of Ireland Premier Division, Shaw continued to impress for the Midlanders, scoring 7 goals in 39 appearances across all competitions as his side finished up in a very impressive 6th-place.

=== Shamrock Rovers ===
Despite still having another year left on his contract with Longford Town, Shamrock Rovers boss Pat Fenlon was impressed enough by Shaw's form to pay an undisclosed fee to Longford for his signature as he was announced as having signed for the Hoops on 15 December 2015 alongside Dean Clarke. Having initially struggled with injuries, he scored his first goal in Rovers colours on 10 May 2016 in a 3–0 win over Sligo Rovers at Tallaght Stadium. Shaw finished up his first season in Tallaght with 7 goals in 31 appearances which included 2 appearances against Finnish side RoPS in the UEFA Europa League, Shaw's first taste of European football.

2017 was a brilliant season for Shaw as he scored 11 goals in 28 league games for the Hoops, making 10 further appearances in cup competitions, including all UEFA Europa League qualifiers as the Hoops knocked out Stjarnan of Iceland courtesy of a Shaw winning goal away from home, before being knocked out by FK Mladá Boleslav of the Czech Republic. Rovers bettered their 4th-place finish of the previous season by finishing 3rd, as well as being knocked out of the FAI Cup in a semi-final replay vs Dundalk, having also lost in the League of Ireland Cup Final to the same opposition. At the end of the season, Shaw was named as Shamrock Rovers Player of the Year.

Shaw found it difficult to find full fitness in early 2018, having missed a large amount of pre-season due to a broken arm he suffered in the second-last game of the previous season against Bray Wanderers. He made just 9 league starts that season, finishing up with 3 goals from 25 appearances in all competitions.

=== St Patrick's Athletic ===
On 8 November 2018, it was announced that Shaw had signed for Rovers' Dublin rivals St Patrick's Athletic, becoming new manager Harry Kenny's first signing. Shaw's first goal for the club came on 15 April 2019, a diving header against Derry City at Richmond Park. In July he featured in both legs of his sides UEFA Europa League qualifiers against IFK Norrköping of Sweden. In between the Europa League matches against Norrköping, he played the second half of a friendly match against UEFA Europa League champions Chelsea, playing as the lone striker up front against a defence made up of Marcos Alonso, César Azpilicueta, Andreas Christensen and Kurt Zouma. Shaw scored the winner in a 1–0 win away to Cabinteely in the Leinster Senior Cup Quarter Final on 15 September which turned out to be his last goal for the club.

=== Return to Bray Wanderers ===
On 19 November 2019, it was announced that Shaw had signed for Bray Wanderers for a second spell at the League of Ireland First Division club. He scored on his second debut with a header in a 4–2 defeat to Cabinteely on the opening night of the season and followed that up a week later with his second goal in 2 games against Wexford Youths in a 2–0 victory at the Carlisle Grounds before sport in Ireland was suspended due to the COVID-19 pandemic. Shaw continued where he left off once the season resumed and finished the season with 8 goals in 18 games as his side lost to Galway United in the First Division play-off Semi-Final. On the 23 November 2020, Shaw signed a new contract with the club for the 2021 season. On the 3rd September 2021 (against UCD) he became the first player in League Of Ireland history to come on as a substitute during the second half of a match (after 61 minutes) and score a hat-trick.

He retired from professional football at the end of 2021.

== International career ==
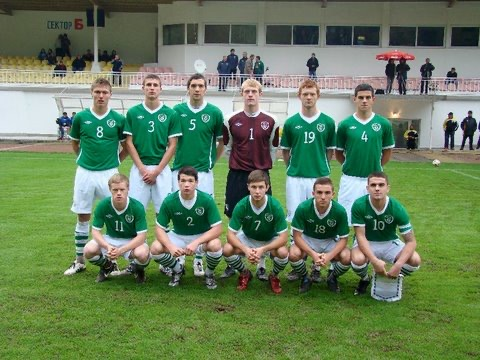
Shaw (number 19) with the Republic of Ireland U19 in 2010.

In 2010, Shaw was selected for the Irish Schools' team which took part in the Centenary Shield, an annual international tournament made up of teams from England, Ireland, Scotland, Wales and Northern Ireland. After losing their opening match, Ireland went on to record victories over Wales 1–0, Scotland 5–2 (Shaw amongst the scorers) and England 1–0 to claim the title, with Shaw setting up the winning goal for team-mate Robbie Benson in the final game of the series against England at the Pirelli Stadium, home of Burton Albion.

Later in 2010, Shaw was selected for the Republic of Ireland U19 team taking part in the qualifying phase for the 2011 European Championships. He made his international debut in a 5–0 win over Luxembourg in Bulgaria, starting up front alongside Robbie Brady in a team which also included Shane Duffy, Jeff Hendrick, John Egan and Daryl Horgan. Ireland went on to qualify for the Finals, reaching the semi-final where they were beaten by Spain, who went on to win the tournament, beating the Czech Republic in the final. The Spanish team included future stars Alvaro Morata, Dani Carvajal and Gerard Deulofeu.

== Career statistics ==
Professional appearances – correct as of 14 December 2021.

Club	Division	Season	League		Cup		League Cup		Europe		Other		Total	
Club	Division	Season	Apps	Goals	Apps	Goals	Apps	Goals	Apps	Goals	Apps	Goals	Apps	Goals
Bray Wanderers	League of Ireland Premier Division	2010	7	3	1	0	0	0	—		3 (Note: Appearances in League of Ireland promotion/relegation playoffs)	0	11	3
Bray Wanderers	League of Ireland Premier Division	2011	7	1	0	0	1	0	—		0	0	8	1
Longford Town	League of Ireland First Division	2012	22	5	0	0	1	0	—		0	0	23	5
Longford Town	League of Ireland First Division	2013	24	3	2	0	0	0	—		6 (Note: 4 Appearances in League of Ireland promotion/relegation playoffs, 2 Appearances in Leinster Senior Cup)	0	32	3
Longford Town	League of Ireland First Division	2014	27	12	2	0	3	3	—		2 (Note: Appearances in Leinster Senior Cup)	1	34	16
Longford Town	League of Ireland Premier Division	2015	32	5	5	0	1	0	—		1	2	39	7
Longford Town	Longford Town Total		105	25	9	0	5	3	—		9	3	128	31
Shamrock Rovers	League of Ireland Premier Division	2016	27	6	1	1	1	0	2 (Note: Appearances in UEFA Europa League)	0	0	0	31	7
Shamrock Rovers	League of Ireland Premier Division	2017	28	11	4	0	1	0	4	1	1	0	38	12
Shamrock Rovers	League of Ireland Premier Division	2018	23	3	1	0	1	0	0	0	0	0	25	3
Shamrock Rovers	Shamrock Rovers Total		78	20	6	1	3	0	6	1	1	0	94	22
St Patrick's Athletic	League of Ireland Premier Division	2019	29	1	1	0	1	0	2	0	2	1	35	2
Bray Wanderers	League of Ireland First Division	2020	16	8	1	0	—		—		1 (Note: Appearances in 2020 League of Ireland promotion/relegation playoffs)	0	18	8
Bray Wanderers	League of Ireland First Division	2021	21	5	1	0	—		—		2 (Note: Appearances in 2021 League of Ireland promotion/relegation playoffs)	0	24	5
Bray Wanderers	Bray Wanderers Total		51	17	3	0	1	0	—		6	0	61	17
Career Total			251	57	19	1	10	3	8	1	18	4	306	66

== Honours ==
=== Club ===
Longford Town

- League of Ireland First Division (1): 2014

St Patrick's Athletic

- Leinster Senior Cup (1): 2019

=== Individual ===
- PFAI First Division Team of the Year (1): 2014
- Longford Town Player of the Year (1): 2014
- Shamrock Rovers Player of the Year (1): 2017
