= Brian Maher (footballer) =

Irish professional footballer

Personal information
- Full name: Brian Philip Maher
- Date of birth: 1 November 2000 (age 26)
- Place of birth: Raheny, Dublin, Ireland
- Height: 1.85 m (6 ft 1 in)
- Position: Goalkeeper

Team information
- Current team: Derry City
- Number: 1

Youth career
- Raheny United
- St Kevin's Boys
- 2016–2018: St Patrick's Athletic

Senior career*
Years	Team	Apps	(Gls)
2018–2020	St Patrick's Athletic	0	(0)
2020	→ Bray Wanderers (loan)	2	(0)
2020–2021	Bray Wanderers	44	(0)
2022–	Derry City	149	(0)

International career^{‡}
2017	Republic of Ireland U17	10	(0)
2018–2019	Republic of Ireland U19	9	(0)
2021–2022	Republic of Ireland U21	12	(0)
- * Club domestic league appearances and goals as of 16:01, 8 September 2026 (UTC) ‡ National team caps and goals as of 22:46, 20 September 2023 (UTC)

Brian Philip Maher (born 1 November 2000) is an Irish footballer who plays as a goalkeeper for League of Ireland Premier Division club Derry City. He previously played for St Patrick's Athletic and Bray Wanderers.

== Early life ==
Maher was born in Dublin in 2000 and played for local clubs Raheny United and St Kevin's Boys in Dublin at underage level before signing for St Patrick's Athletic in 2016.

== Club career ==
Maher joined St Patrick's Athletic's under-17 side in 2016 and signed his first contract for the club in 2018, although never made a senior league appearance for the club and left to join Bray Wanderers in 2020, initially as a loan move, but then made permanent later that year. Maher made his debut for Bray in a 4–2 loss to Cabinteely. Maher went on to make 19 total appearances for Bray that season, helping them to a second-place finish. The next season Maher would become a regular for Bray and he would make 29 appearances in the 2021 First Division season.

In 2022 Maher signed for League of Ireland Premier Division side Derry City. It would go on to be a very successful season for Derry and Maher as they would finish second in the table and win the FAI Cup for the first time in 10 years. Maher was shortlisted for 2022 Soccer Writers Ireland Goalkeeper of the Year award. On 5 May 2025 Maher made his 111th consecutive league appearance for Derry City, breaking the record previously set by former goalkeeper Dermot O'Neill. In February 2026 he suffered a broken bone in his wrist that would require surgery and keep him out of action for several months. On 28 June 2026, Maher signed a new with the club until the end of the 2028 season. On 8 November 2026, he was part of the starting XI in a 1–0 win over Waterford in the 2026 FAI Cup final at the Aviva Stadium.

== International career ==
Maher has been a regular for the Republic of Ireland at underage level since he first played for the U17, and has since went on to play for the country at U19 and U21 level.

== Career statistics ==
As of match played on 8 November 2026

Appearances and goals by club, season and competition
Club	Season	League			National Cup		League Cup		Europe		Other		Total	
Club	Season	Division	Apps	Goals	Apps	Goals	Apps	Goals	Apps	Goals	Apps	Goals	Apps	Goals
St Patrick's Athletic	2018	LOI Premier Division	0	0	0	0	0	0	—		2 (Note: Appearances in the Leinster Senior Cup)	0	2	0
St Patrick's Athletic	2019	LOI Premier Division	0	0	0	0	0	0	0 (Note: Appearances in the UEFA Europa League)	0	3	0	3	0
St Patrick's Athletic	2020	LOI Premier Division	0	0	—		—		—		—		0	0
St Patrick's Athletic	Total		0	0	0	0	0	0	0	0	5	0	5	0
Bray Wanderers (loan)	2020	LOI First Division	2	0	—		—		—		—		2	0
Bray Wanderers	2020	LOI First Division	18	0	1	0	—		—		1 (Note: Appearance in the 2020 League of Ireland First Division Promotion Play-Offs)	0	20	0
Bray Wanderers	2021	LOI First Division	26	0	1	0	—		—		3 (Note: Appearances in the 2021 League of Ireland First Division Promotion Play-Offs)	0	30	0
Bray Wanderers	Total		44	0	2	0	—		—		4	0	50	0
Derry City	2022	LOI Premier Division	34	0	5	0	—		2 (Note: Appearances in the UEFA Europa Conference League)	0	—		41	0
Derry City	2023	LOI Premier Division	36	0	1	0	—		6	0	1 (Note: Appearance in the President of Ireland's Cup)	0	44	0
Derry City	2024	LOI Premier Division	36	0	5	0	—		2 (Note: Appearances in the UEFA Conference League)	0	—		43	0
Derry City	2025	LOI Premier Division	36	0	2	0	—		—		—		38	0
Derry City	2026	LOI Premier Division	7	0	3	0	—		4 (Note: 2 appearances in the UEFA Europa League; 2 appearances in the UEFA Conference League)	0	1	0	15	0
Derry City	Total		149	0	16	0	—		14	0	2	0	185	0
Career total			194	0	18	0	0	0	14	0	11	0	241	0

== Honours ==
=== Club ===
St Patrick's Athletic

- Leinster Senior Cup: 2018–19

Derry City

- FAI Cup: 2022, 2026
- President of Ireland's Cup: 2023, 2026

Individual

- League of Ireland Premier Division Most cleansheets: 2022, 2023
- PFAI Premier Division Team of the Year: 2022
- PFAI First Division Team of the Year: 2020
