= 2018–19 Leinster Senior Cup =

2019 Leinster Senior Cup
Leinster Football Association Senior Cup

Tournament details
- Country: Ireland

Final positions
- Champions: St Patrick's Athletic
- Runners-up: Athlone Town

The 2019 Leinster Senior Cup was the 118th staging of the Leinster Football Association's primary competition. It included all Leinster based League of Ireland clubs from the First Division and Premier Division, as well as a selection of intermediate level sides. The competition was won by St Patrick's Athletic

== Teams ==
Premier Division	First Division	LSL	Other Leagues	Other Leagues
Bohemians; Dundalk; Shamrock Rovers; St Patrick's Athletic; UCD	Athlone Town; Bray Wanderers; Cabinteely; Drogheda United; Longford Town; Shelbourne; Wexford	Ayrfield United; Bluebell United; Crumlin United; Firhouse Clover F.C.; Kilbarrack United; Killester Donnycarney; Malahide United	AUL: Sheriff YC; Usher Celtic; Wexford Football League: North End United; Carlow & District Football League: Hanover Harps; Kilkenny & District Soccer League: Evergreen F.C.; Wicklow & District Football League: Ashford Rovers AFC	Meath and District League: Trim Celtic AFC; United Churches Football League: Harding IF FC; Leinster Football League Development League: Tallaght City FC; Combined Counties Football League: Monksland United; Kildare & District Football League: Suncroft AFC

== Preliminary round ==
The draw for the preliminary round and first round was made on 1 August 2018.

2 September 2018	Trim Celtic	2–0	Suncroft AFC	Trim, County Meath
14:00 GMT	Colm Carney,			Stadium: Tully Park, Summerhill Road

2 September 2018	Ashford Rovers	5–1	Monksland United	Ashford, County Wicklow
12:30 GMT	Jack Geraghty, Robbie Eyre, Evan Dunne			Stadium: Ballinalea Park

14 October 2018	Hanover Harps	3–0	Tallaght City	Carlow, County Carlow
14:00 GMT	Simon O'Shea; Mark Davis; Alan Shaw			Stadium: The Plots; Referee: Seamus Ivers

== First round ==
24 August 2018	Kilbarrack United	2–0	Harding IF	Kilbarrack, Dublin 5
	Alan Clarke 15'; Anto McKay 80'			Stadium: Greendale Astro

18 September 2018	Usher Celtic	0–4	North End United	Clonshaugh, Dublin 17
				Stadium: AUL Complex

13 October 2018	Evergreen FC	4–0	Trim Celtic	Kilkenny, County Kilkenny
	Ben Hickey, Sean Barcoe,		Sean FitzGerald (red card); Anthony Burke (red card)	Stadium: Evergreen Park

6 January 2019	Hanover Harps	3–3 (a.e.t.) (8–7 p)	Ashford Rovers	Carlow, County Carlow
				Stadium: The Plots

== Second round ==
9 December 2018	Evergreen FC	0–1	Ayrfield United	Kilkenny, County Kilkenny
				Stadium: Evergreen Park

9 December 2018	North End United	2–1	Kilbarrack United	Wexford, County Wexford
				Stadium: Hollygrove

27 January 2019	Sheriff YC	4–0	Hanover Harps	Clontarf, Dublin 3
13:00 GMT	Anthony Flood, Josh McMahon; Shay Rooney			Stadium: Clontarf All Weather

== Third round ==
6 January 2019	Killester Donnycarney	5–3	Bluebell United	Killester, Dublin 5
				Stadium: Hadden Park

8 January 2019	Crumlin United	5–0	Malahide United	Crumlin, Dublin 12
20:00				Stadium: Pearse Park

27 January 2019	Ayrfield United	1–2	North End United	Ayrfield, Dublin 13
				Stadium: Blunden Drive

19 March 2019	Firhouse Clover	1–2	Sherrif YC	Tallaght, Dublin 24
19:45 GMT				Stadium: Sacred Heart FC Soccer Pitch

== Fourth round ==
The 12 Leinster teams from the League of Ireland join the competition in this round.

18 February 2019	St Patrick's Athletic	3–0	Wexford	Inchicore, Dublin 8
19:45 GMT	Chris Forrester 56'; Jake Walker 58'; Paul Cleary 90+2'	Report		Stadium: Richmond Park

18 February 2019	Dundalk	0–1	Athlone Town	Dundalk, County Louth
19:45 GMT		Report	Dean Williams 66'	Stadium: Oriel Park; Attendance: 250 (est.); Referee: Alan Carey

11 March 2019	Shelbourne	1–4	Bohemians	Drumcondra, Dublin 9
19:45 GMT	Dayle Rooney 30'	Report	Aaron Barry 8', 90+3'; Daniel Grant 14'; Charles Mutawe 35' (o.g.)	Stadium: Tolka Park; Attendance: 657; Referee: Oliver Moran

18 March 2019	Bray Wanderers	1–2	Cabinteely	Bray, County Wicklow
14:30 GMT	Luka Lovic 84'	Report	Luke Clucas 9' (pen.); Sean Fitzpatrick 45+1'	Stadium: Carlisle Grounds; Attendance: 525; Referee: Stephen Parnell

3 August 2019	Killester Donnycarney	1–0	Shamrock Rovers	Killester, Dublin 5
14:30 GMT	Dylan Maloney 48'			Stadium: Hadden Park

21 August 2019	Sheriff YC	1–1 (a.e.t.) (4–2 p)	Drogheda United	Glasnevin, Dublin 9
19:45 GMT	Stephen Maher 35' (pen.); Hayden McCauley (red card) 90'		Jordan Adeyemo 86'	Stadium: Frank Cooke Park

27 August 2019	North End United	5–1	Longford Town	Wexford, County Wexford
19:00 GMT				Stadium: Hollygrove

24 September 2019	UCD	4–1	Crumlin United	Belfield, Dublin 4
19:45 GMT	Dara Keane 55'} Richie O'Farrell 67'; Richie O'Farrell 70'; Paul Doyle 90+3'	Report	Gareth Brady 53'	Stadium: UCD Bowl; Attendance: 150 (Est.); Referee: Oliver Moran

== Quarter-finals ==
15 September 2019	Cabinteely	0–1	St Patrick's Athletic	Blackrock, Dublin 4
15:30 GMT		Report	Gary Shaw 44'	Stadium: Stradbrook Road; Attendance: 150 (estimate); Referee: Alan Patchell

30 September 2019	Athlone Town	3–2	UCD	Athlone, County Westmeath
19:45 GMT	John Morgan 6'; Adam Lennon 70'; Ciaran Grogan 90'		Jason McClelland 12'; Yousef Mahdy 17'	Stadium: Athlone Town Stadium

11 October 2019	Sheriff YC	2–1	Killester Donnycarney	Clontarf, Dublin 3
19:30 GMT	Anthony Flood 44'; Stephen Maher 86'		Cian McMullan 16'	Stadium: Clontarf All Weather

12 October 2019	Bohemians	3–2	North End United	Phibsborough, Dublin
12:00 GMT	Marlon Marishta 77'; Ryan Graydon 82'; Ryan Graydon 87' (pen.)	Report	Paul Murphy 22'; Niall Connolly 50'	Stadium: Dalymount Park; Attendance: 250 (estimate); Referee: Mark Moynihan

== Semi-finals ==
1 November 2019	Sheriff YC	1–3 (a.e.t.)	St Patrick's Athletic	Clontarf, Dublin 3
19:45 GMT	Leon Hayes 63'; Paul Murphy (red card) 113'; Stephen Murphy (red card) 113'; Anthony Flood (yellow card) 120+1' (red card)	Report	Daniel Dobbin 61'; Kyle Robinson 113'; Kian Corbally 118'	Stadium: Clontarf All Weather; Attendance: 200 (Est.)

Bohemians	W/O	Athlone Town
	Report
Note: Bohemians withdrew from competition. Athlone Town advance to final

== Final ==
16 November 2019	St Patrick's Athletic	4–0	Athlone Town	Inchicore, Dublin 8
15:00 GMT	Kyle Robinson 33'; Brandon Holt 55'; Jake Walker 76'; Daniel Dobbin 87'	Report		Stadium: Richmond Park; Attendance: 500 (estimate); Referee: Alan Patchell
