= Harry Kenny =

Irish footballer and manager

Personal information
- Date of birth: 13 April 1962 (age 64)
- Place of birth: Dublin, Ireland
- Position: Full back

Senior career*
Years	Team	Apps	(Gls)
1978–1991	Shamrock Rovers	216	(5)
1991–1993	Drogheda United	35	(0)
1993–1994	Crusaders	21	(0)
1994–1995	Newry Town	2	(0)

International career
1986–1989	League of Ireland XI	8	(0)

Managerial career
- 1995–1997: Kinvara Boys
- 1997–: Ashtown Villa
- 2007: Phoenix F.C.
- 2011: Republic of Ireland women's U17
- 2016–2017: Bray Wanderers
- 2019: St Patrick's Athletic
- * Club domestic league appearances and goals

Harry Kenny (born 13 April 1962) is an Irish footballer who last managed at St Patrick's Athletic before resigning in August 2019. During his playing career he spent 13 seasons playing for Shamrock Rovers.

== Club Career ==
=== Shamrock Rovers ===
Harry 'H' Kenny joined his boyhood club Shamrock Rovers in September 1978, one year after Johnny Giles had been appointed player/manager. Kenny was a number of full-time players who Giles signed up as part of the policy to develop a full-time professional set up at Milltown. Other players brought in were Pierce O'Leary, Alan Campbell and Ritchie Bayly.

Kenny made his Rovers debut at 16 on 20 December 1978 in a Leinster Senior Cup quarter final win against Dunleary Celtic at Tolka Park. His league debut came on 3 April 1979 in a 4–0 win against Cork Celtic at Milltown. He scored his first goal for the Hoops on 3 December 1980 in a Leinster Senior Cup semi final loss to UCD. Kenny became a regular in the first team until breaking his leg against Sligo Rovers in a league game at Milltown on 11 October 1981. Peter Eccles would take Kenny's place for much of the 1981-82 season.

In his second full season at Milltown, H won the 1980-81 Shamrock Rovers Player of the Year Award.

In 1982 Harry spent 6 months at Vancouver Whitecaps.

In April 1983 he played for the League of Ireland XI U21s against their Italian League counterparts who included Roberto Mancini and Gianluca Vialli in their team.

In the 1983-84 season Kenny made only 5 appearances during Jim McLaughlin's first season in charge, missing out on a league winners medal. Although he had played well in pre-season friendlies Kenny stalled renewing his contract causing McLaughlin to pick Anto Whelan in favour of Kenny.

In the 1984-85 season Kenny won 2 league medals as Kenny had made enough appearances to claim medals for both Shamrock Rovers first and second team teams who had both won their league titles. To add to that he won two more league medals and three FAI Cup's as Rovers continued to dominate the league right through to 1986-87. In addition to schoolboy and youth international honours Harry has also played for the League of Ireland XI in 7 Olympics qualifiers.

At Dalymount Park on 19 January 1986 Kenny received a red card after 4 minutes after a brief altercation with Tom Conway.

Kenny scored the first goal from the penalty spot in a 3-0 win against Dundalk the 1987 FAI Cup Final winning Shamrock Rovers their third league and cup double in a row.

In 1988, after spending 10 years at the club, Kenny had a testimonial luncheon at Stewart's hospital. Members of Ireland's UEFA Euro 1988 squad which included ex-teammate Liam O'Brien attended with manager Jack Charlton being the guest of honor.

Harry's final appearance was at the RDS against Dundalk on 15 April 1991. It was his 300th competitive appearance in the green and white.

=== Drogheda United and later career ===
In 1991, despite being shortlisted to fill in the managerial vacancy at Kilkenny City, Kenny joined Drogheda United for £4,000. Due to financial problems at the club, Drogheda were unable to submit the full payments were subsequently handed a point deduction. His first game against Rovers resulted in a win and the subsequent sacking of Noel King. In Kenny's two seasons at Drogheda they managed to survive relegation. At the end of the 1992-93 season Kenny was released by Drogheda. He moved to Crusaders for the 1993–94 season and finished up his career with Newry Town in 1994–95.

At the 2007 Shamrock Rovers Player of the Year Awards Harry Kenny was the Hall of Fame recipient.

== International Career ==
Kenny was capped for the Irish schoolboys at U15, U17 and youths level.

Kenny was chosen in an all League of Ireland Ireland national team selection for a friendly against Peru on 16 June 1989.

== Coaching career ==
Kenny's first foray into management came as player-manager with his local junior team, Kinvara Boys, who were then playing in the Athletic Union League Premier A Division. Kenny managed the Navan Road outfit from the 1994–95 season until his departure in the close season of 1996–97. Kenny then joined Ashtown Villa as their manager, taking them to an FAI Cup first round home tie against rivals Cherry Orchard.

Kenny also managed Phoenix F.C. in the Leinster Senior League.

Kenny was assistant manager to Noel King as the Republic of Ireland women's under-17 team reached the UEFA European Championship final in 2010, losing on penalties to Spain. The team also qualified for the Under-17 World Cup that same year. When King departed to take charge of the men's under-21 team, Kenny was appointed manager of the women's under-17 team where he managed Katie McCabe.

Kenny was appointed assistant manager of former team mate Liam Buckley at St. Patrick's Athletic during their title winning 2013 League of Ireland campaign.

Kenny joined Mick Cooke as assistant manager at Athlone Town in 2014 and followed Cooke to Bray Wanderers in 2015. Kenny became caretaker manager of Bray Wanderers in April 2016 following Cookes departure with the club bottom of the league. A club record 5 games without conceding a goal saw Kenny bringing the Wicklow side to finish 6th. After mixed messaged over the clubs financial position and Garda cars arriving at the Bray training ground to investigate allegations of match fixing Kenny announced his resignantion 3 games before the end of the 2017 season.

Kenny began working for the FAI on their ETB player development course before leaving it to take over as manager of St Patrick's Athletic from Liam Buckley in October 2018. Kenny was in charge of the Inchicore side for their 2019-20 Europa League qualifier against Allsvenskan side IFK Norrkoping where they lost 4-1 on aggregate. On 24 August 2019, after a 3-1 FAI Cup second round loss to UCD, who had been beaten 10-1 by Bohemian FC the previous game, Kenny resigned as manager.

In October 2020 Kenny was appointed assistant manager at League of Ireland First Division side Wexford FC succeeding David Breen who left to join Keith Long at Waterford FC. Kenny departed alongside manager Brian O' Sullivan in May 2021.

Managerial record by team and tenure
Team	From	To	Record							
Team	From	To	G	W	D	L	GF	GA	GD	Win %
Bray Wanderers	14 June 2016	27 October 2017	56	25	12	19	87	74	+13	44.64
St Patrick's Athletic	24 October 2018	24 August 2019	35	14	7	14	31	37	−6	40.00
Total			91	39	19	33	118	111	+7	42.86

== Personal life ==
Kenny grew up in Cabra as one of 9 sons to his father John Kenny. His brothers Sean Kenny and Marc Kenny both played for Shamrock Rovers while another brother Tony Kenny played for St. Patricks Athletic.

Kenny's father-in-law is Hughie Gannon who won the FAI Cup with Rovers in 1955.

In 1982, while at Shamrock Rovers, was forced to play on a part-time basis leading Kenny to work at Quinnsworth who sponsored the club at the time. Kenny would remain working part time for the remainder of his playing career and would be promoted up positions at sports retail store Life Style Sports who were then owned by Quinnsworth. In 1997 Tesco purchased Quinnsworth who would attempt to sell Life Style Sports in the purchase. Kenny entered a deal to buy Life Style Sports and became executive director, owning 6% of the company in and becoming one of the 5 main stakeholders, before the company was sold for €60 million in 2005.

== Honours ==
Shamrock Rovers

- League of Ireland: 4
  - 1983/84, 1984/85, 1985/86, 1986/87
- FAI Cup: 3
  - 1985, 1986, 1987
- LFA President's Cup: 2
  - 1984/85, 1987/88
- SRFC Player of the Year:
  - 1980/81

== Sources ==
- Paul Doolan; Robert Goggins (1993). The Hoops. Gill & MacMillan. ISBN 0-7171-2121-6.
