= List of 2019–20 League of Ireland transfers =

This is a list of transfers involving clubs that played in the 2020 League of Ireland Premier Division and 2020 League of Ireland First Division.

The pre-season transfer window opened on 1 December 2019 and closed on 22 February 2020 for domestic transfers and on 2 March 2020 for foreign transfers. Players without a club may join one at any time, either during or in between transfer windows.

== Pre-Season Transfers ==
=== League of Ireland Premier Division ===
==== Bohemians ====
In:

Player	Country	Position	Signed from	Transfer type
Anthony Breslin	(Republic of Ireland)	Defender	(Republic of Ireland) Longford Town	Free transfer
JJ Lunney	(Republic of Ireland)	Midfielder	(Republic of Ireland) Waterford	Free transfer
Kris Twardek	(Canada)	Midfielder	(Republic of Ireland) Sligo Rovers	Free transfer
Stephen McGuinness	(Republic of Ireland)	Goalkeeper	(Republic of Ireland) Cabinteely	Free transfer
Glen McAuley	(Republic of Ireland)	Forward	(Republic of Ireland) St Patrick's Athletic	Free transfer
Dan Casey	(Republic of Ireland)	Defender	(Republic of Ireland) Cork City	Undisclosed fee
Ciaran Kelly	(Republic of Ireland)	Defender	(Republic of Ireland) St Patrick's Athletic	Undisclosed fee
Callum Thompson	(Republic of Ireland)	Midfielder	(England) Wolverhampton Wanderers	Loan

Out:

Player	Country	Position	Sold to	Transfer type
Derek Pender	(Republic of Ireland)	Defender	Retired	Retirement
Aaron Barry	(Republic of Ireland)	Defender	(Republic of Ireland) Cork City	End of loan
Brandon Bermingham	(Northern Ireland)	Forward	(Republic of Ireland) Drogheda United	Free transfer
Darragh Leahy	(Republic of Ireland)	Defender	(Republic of Ireland) Dundalk	Free transfer
Scott Allardice	(Scotland)	Midfielder	(Republic of Ireland) Waterford	Free transfer
Ryan Swan	(Republic of Ireland)	Forward	(Northern Ireland) Warrenpoint Town	Free transfer
Michael O'Keane	(Republic of Ireland)	Midfielder	(Republic of Ireland) UCD	Free transfer
Michael Kelly	(Republic of Ireland)	Goalkeeper	(Republic of Ireland) Cabinteely	Free transfer
Ryan Graydon	(Republic of Ireland)	Midfielder	(Republic of Ireland) Bray Wanderers	Free transfer

==== Cork City ====
In:

Player	Country	Position	Signed from	Transfer type
Cian Coleman	(Republic of Ireland)	Midfielder	(Republic of Ireland) St Patrick's Athletic	Free transfer
Rob Slevin	(Republic of Ireland)	Defender	(Republic of Ireland) Waterford	Free transfer
Charlie Fleming	(Republic of Ireland)	Defender	(Republic of Ireland) Cobh Ramblers	Free transfer
Liam Bossin	(Republic of Ireland)	Goalkeeper	(England) Nottingham Forest	Free transfer
Dylan McGlade	(Republic of Ireland)	Midfielder	(England) Blyth Spartans	Free transfer
Cory Galvin	(Republic of Ireland)	Midfielder	(Republic of Ireland) Waterford	Free transfer
Conor Davis	(Republic of Ireland)	Forward	(Republic of Ireland) Derry City	Free transfer
Kyron Stabana	(England)	Defender	(England) AFC Wimbledon	Loan
Henry Ochieng	(Kenya)	Midfielder	(England) Wingate & Finchley	Undisclosed fee
Joe Redmond	(Republic of Ireland)	Defender	(England) Birmingham City	Loan
Reyon Dillon	(England)	Forward	(England) Corinthian-Casuals	Free transfer
Joseph Olowu	(England)	Defender	(England) Arsenal	Loan
Deshane Dalling	(England)	Midfielder	(England) Queens Park Rangers	Loan

Out:

Player	Country	Position	Sold to	Transfer type
Karl Sheppard	(Republic of Ireland)	Forward	(Republic of Ireland) Shelbourne	Free transfer
Graham Cummins	(Republic of Ireland)	Forward	(Republic of Ireland) Waterford	Free transfer
Colm Horgan	(Republic of Ireland)	Defender	(Republic of Ireland) Derry CIty	Free transfer
Eoghan Stokes	(Republic of Ireland)	Forward	Free agent	Released
Joel Coustrain	(Republic of Ireland)	Midfielder	(Republic of Ireland) Shamrock Rovers	End of loan
Mark O'Sullivan	(Republic of Ireland)	Forward	Free agent	Released
Kevin O'Connor	(Republic of Ireland)	Defender	(England) Preston North End	End of loan
Pierce Phillips	(Republic of Ireland)	Midfielder	(Republic of Ireland) Cobh Ramblers	Free transfer
Aaron Barry	(Republic of Ireland)	Defender	(Republic of Ireland) Bray Wanderers	Free transfer
Gary Boylan	(Republic of Ireland)	Defender	Retired	Change of sport
Garry Buckley	(Republic of Ireland)	Midfielder	(Republic of Ireland) Sligo Rovers	Free transfer
Dan Casey	(Republic of Ireland)	Defender	(Republic of Ireland) Bohemians	Undisclosed fee
Shane Griffin	(Republic of Ireland)	Defender	(Republic of Ireland) St Patrick's Athletic	Free transfer
Conor McCormack	(Republic of Ireland)	Midfielder	(Republic of Ireland) Derry City	Free transfer
Tadhg Ryan	(Republic of Ireland)	Goalkeeper	(Republic of Ireland) Waterford	Free transfer
Conor McCarthy	(Republic of Ireland)	Defender	(Scotland) St Mirren	Undisclosed fee

==== Derry City ====
In:

Player	Country	Position	Signed from	Transfer type
Walter Figueira	(England)	Forward	(Republic of Ireland) Waterford	Free transfer
Conor Clifford	(Republic of Ireland)	Midfielder	(Republic of Ireland) St Patrick's Athletic	Free transfer
Conor McCormack	(Republic of Ireland)	Midfielder	(Republic of Ireland) Cork City	Free transfer
Stephen Mallon	(Republic of Ireland)	Midfielder	(England) Sheffield United	Loan
Colm Horgan	(Republic of Ireland)	Defender	(Republic of Ireland) Cork CIty	Free transfer
Tim Nilsen	(Norway)	Forward	(Norway) Fredrikstad	Free transfer
Danny Lupano	(Belgium)	Defender	(England) Hull City	Loan
Moussa Bakayoko	(Ivory Coast)	Forward	(Armenia) FC Shirak	Free transfer
Adam Liddle	(England)	Forward	(England) Reading	Loan

Out:

Player	Country	Position	Sold to	Transfer type
Conor McDermott	(Northern Ireland)	Defender	(Northern Ireland) Cliftonville	Undisclosed Fee
Adrian Delap	(Republic of Ireland)	Midfielder	(Republic of Ireland) Finn Harps	Loan
Conor Davis	(Republic of Ireland)	Forward	(Republic of Ireland) Cork City	Free transfer
Michael McCrudden	(Northern Ireland)	Forward	(Northern Ireland) Cliftonville	Undisclosed Fee
Grant Gillespie	(Scotland)	Midfielder	(Scotland) Ayr United	Loan
Barry McNamee	(Republic of Ireland)	Midfielder	(Republic of Ireland) Finn Harps	Free transfer

==== Dundalk ====
In:

Player	Country	Position	Signed from	Transfer type
Greg Sloggett	(Republic of Ireland)	Midfielder	(Republic of Ireland) Derry City	Free transfer
Will Patching	(England)	Midfielder	(England) Notts County	Free transfer
Darragh Leahy	(Republic of Ireland)	Defender	(Republic of Ireland) Bohemians	Free transfer
Cammy Smith	(Scotland)	Forward	(Scotland) Dundee United	Loan
Stefan Čolović	(Serbia)	Midfielder	(Serbia) Proleter Novi Sad	Undisclosed fee
Nathan Oduwa	(Nigeria)	Midfielder	(Israel) Hapoel Hadera	Free transfer

Out:

Player	Country	Position	Sold to	Transfer type
Stephen Folan	(Republic of Ireland)	Defender	(Australia) South Melbourne	Free transfer
Robbie Benson	(Republic of Ireland)	Midfielder	(Republic of Ireland) St Patrick's Athletic	Free transfer
Dean Jarvis	(Northern Ireland)	Defender	(Northern Ireland) Larne	Free transfer
Ross Treacy	(Republic of Ireland)	Goalkeeper	(Republic of Ireland) Drogheda United	Free transfer
Dylan Hand	(Republic of Ireland)	Defender	(Republic of Ireland) Longford Town	Free transfer
David Odumosu	(Republic of Ireland)	Goalkeeper	(Republic of Ireland) Drogheda United	Free transfer
Jamie McGrath	(Republic of Ireland)	Midfielder	(Scotland) St Mirren	Free transfer
Aaron McNally	(Republic of Ireland)	Defender	(Republic of Ireland) Longford Town	Free transfer
James Carroll	(Republic of Ireland)	Defender	(Republic of Ireland) Wexford	Free transfer
Cameron Dummigan	(Northern Ireland)	Defender	(Northern Ireland) Crusaders	Loan

==== Finn Harps ====
In:

Player	Country	Position	Signed from	Transfer type
Adrian Delap	(Republic of Ireland)	Midfielder	(Republic of Ireland) Derry City	Loan
Ryan Connolly	(Republic of Ireland)	Midfielder	(Republic of Ireland) Ballyglass	Free transfer
David Webster	(Republic of Ireland)	Defender	(Republic of Ireland) St Patrick's Athletic	Free transfer
Shane McEleney	(Republic of Ireland)	Defender	(Northern Ireland) Larne	Free transfer
Karl O'Sullivan	(Republic of Ireland)	Midfielder	(Republic of Ireland) Limerick	Free Transfer
Kosovar Sadiki	(Canada)	Defender	(Scotland) Hibernians	Loan
Shaun Kelly	(Republic of Ireland)	Defender	(Republic of Ireland) Limerick	Free transfer
Leo Donnellan	(Republic of Ireland)	Midfielder	(England) Maidstone United	Free transfer
Barry McNamee	(Republic of Ireland)	Midfielder	(Republic of Ireland) Derry City	Free transfer
Cameron Saul	(England)	Forward	(United States) Greenville Triumph	Free transfer
Alexander Kogler	(Austria)	Midfielder	(Austria) Grazer AK	Free transfer

Out:

Player	Country	Position	Sold to	Transfer type
Ciaran Gallagher	(Republic of Ireland)	Goalkeeper	Retired	Retirement
Peter Burke	(Republic of Ireland)	Goalkeeper	Free agent	Released
Niall Logue	(Republic of Ireland)	Defender	Free agent	Released
Daniel O'Reilly	(Republic of Ireland)	Defender	(Republic of Ireland) Shelbourne	Free transfer
Harry Ascroft	(Australia)	Midfielder	(Australia) Dandenong Thunder	Free transfer
Nathan Boyle	(Northern Ireland)	Forward	Free agent	Released
Michael Gallagher	(Republic of Ireland)	Midfielder	(Republic of Ireland) UCD	Free transfer
Keith Cowan	(Republic of Ireland)	Defender	(Northern Ireland) Glentoran	Free transfer
Mikey Place	(Republic of Ireland)	Forward	(Republic of Ireland) Galway United	Free transfer
Caolan McAleer	(Republic of Ireland)	Midfielder	(Northern Ireland) Dungannon Swifts	Free transfer
Joshua Smith	(United States)	Defender	(Republic of Ireland) Galway United	Free transfer
Colm Deasy	(Republic of Ireland)	Defender	(Northern Ireland) Warrenpoint Town	Free transfer

==== St Patrick's Athletic ====
In:

Player	Country	Position	Signed from	Transfer type
Jason McClelland	(Republic of Ireland)	Midfielder	(Republic of Ireland) UCD	Free transfer
Robbie Benson	(Republic of Ireland)	Midfielder	(Republic of Ireland) Dundalk	Free transfer
Rory Feely	(Republic of Ireland)	Defender	(Republic of Ireland) Waterford	Free transfer
Conor Kearns	(Republic of Ireland)	Goalkeeper	(Republic of Ireland) UCD	Free transfer
Shane Griffin	(Republic of Ireland)	Defender	(Republic of Ireland) Cork City	Free transfer
Billy King	(Scotland)	Midfielder	(Scotland) Greenock Morton	Free transfer
Dan Ward	(England)	Midfielder	(England) Spennymoor Town	Free transfer
Martin Rennie	(Scotland)	Forward	(Scotland) Montrose	Undisclosed fee
Ollie Younger	(England)	Defender	(England) Burnley	Loan

Out:

Player	Country	Position	Sold to	Transfer type
Cian Coleman	(Republic of Ireland)	Midfielder	(Republic of Ireland) Cork City	Free transfer
Mikey Drennan	(Republic of Ireland)	Forward	(Republic of Ireland) Evergreen	Free transfer
Glen McAuley	(Republic of Ireland)	Forward	(Republic of Ireland) Bohemians	Free transfer
Gary Shaw	(Republic of Ireland)	Forward	(Republic of Ireland) Bray Wanderers	Free transfer
Conor Clifford	(Republic of Ireland)	Midfielder	(Republic of Ireland) Derry City	Free transfer
Rhys McCabe	(Scotland)	Midfielder	(Scotland) Brechin City	Free transfer
Kevin Toner	(Republic of Ireland)	Defender	(Republic of Ireland) Kilmore Celtic	Free transfer
David Webster	(Republic of Ireland)	Defender	(Republic of Ireland) Finn Harps	Free transfer
Ciaran Kelly	(Republic of Ireland)	Defender	(Republic of Ireland) Bohemians	Undisclosed fee
Barry Murphy	(Republic of Ireland)	Goalkeeper	Free agent	Released
Brian Maher	(Republic of Ireland)	Goalkeeper	(Republic of Ireland) Bray Wanderers	Loan
Paul Cleary	(Republic of Ireland)	Defender	(Republic of Ireland) Wexford	Loan

==== Shamrock Rovers ====
In:

Player	Country	Position	Signed from	Transfer type
Liam Scales	(Republic of Ireland)	Defender	(Republic of Ireland) UCD	Free transfer
Rhys Marshall	(Northern Ireland)	Defender	(Northern Ireland) Glenavon	Undisclosed fee
Rory Gaffney	(Republic of Ireland)	Forward	(England) Salford City	Undisclosed fee

Out:

Player	Country	Position	Sold to	Transfer type
Joel Coustrain	(Republic of Ireland)	Midfielder	(Republic of Ireland) Athlone Town	Free transfer
Graham Cummins	(Republic of Ireland)	Forward	(Republic of Ireland) Cork City	End of loan
Seán Boyd	(Republic of Ireland)	Forward	Free agent	Released
Eric Abulu	(Germany)	Defender	(Republic of Ireland) Longford Town	Free transfer
Orhan Vojic	(Austria)	Forward	Free agent	Released
Ethan Boyle	(Republic of Ireland)	Defender	(Northern Ireland) Linfield	Free transfer
Sam Bone	(England)	Defender	(Republic of Ireland) Waterford	Free transfer
Cian Collins	(Republic of Ireland)	Defender	(Gibraltar) Europa Point	Free transfer
Dean Dillon	(Republic of Ireland)	Forward	(Gibraltar) Europa Point	Free transfer

==== Shelbourne ====
In:

Player	Country	Position	Signed from	Transfer type
Aaron Dobbs	(Republic of Ireland)	Forward	(Republic of Ireland) Longford Town	Free transfer
Jack Brady	(Republic of Ireland)	Goalkeeper	(Republic of Ireland) Limerick	Free transfer
Karl Sheppard	(Republic of Ireland)	Forward	(Republic of Ireland) Cork City	Free transfer
Daniel O'Reilly	(Republic of Ireland)	Defender	(Republic of Ireland) Finn Harps	Free transfer
Georgie Poynton	(Republic of Ireland)	Midfielder	(Republic of Ireland) Waterford	Free transfer
Gary Deegan	(Republic of Ireland)	Midfielder	(England) Cambridge United	Free transfer

Out:

Player	Country	Position	Sold to	Transfer type
Dean Delany	(Republic of Ireland)	Goalkeeper	Retired	Retirement
Conan Byrne	(Republic of Ireland)	Midfielder	(Northern Ireland) Glenavon	Free transfer
Flavio Marku	(Republic of Ireland)	Defender	Free agent	Released
James English	(Republic of Ireland)	Forward	(Republic of Ireland) Longford Town	Free transfer
Darragh Noone	(Republic of Ireland)	Midfielder	(Republic of Ireland) Sligo Rovers	Free transfer
Derek Prendergast	(Republic of Ireland)	Defender	(Republic of Ireland) Drogheda United	Free transfer
John Ross Wilson	(Republic of Ireland)	Defender	(Republic of Ireland) Bray Wanderers	Free transfer
Greg Moorhouse	(Republic of Ireland)	Forward	(Northern Ireland) Glenavon	Free transfer
Craig Giles	(Republic of Ireland)	Defender	(Republic of Ireland) Wexford	Free transfer
Jack Lydon	(Republic of Ireland)	Goalkeeper	(Republic of Ireland) Wexford	Free transfer
Reece McEnteer	(Republic of Ireland)	Defender	(Republic of Ireland) Killester Donnycarney	Free transfer
Alan Byrne	(Republic of Ireland)	Defender	(Republic of Ireland) St Mochta's	Free transfer

==== Sligo Rovers ====
In:

Player	Country	Position	Signed from	Transfer type
Darragh Noone	(Republic of Ireland)	Midfielder	(Republic of Ireland) Shelbourne	Free transfer
Garry Buckley	(Republic of Ireland)	Midfielder	(Republic of Ireland) Cork City	Free transfer
Will Seymore	(United States)	Midfielder	(United States) Reno 1868	Free transfer
Teemu Penninkangas	(Finland)	Defender	(Finland) FC Lahti	Free transfer
Jesse Devers	(Republic of Ireland)	Forward	(Republic of Ireland) Manulla	Free transfer
Alex Cooper	(Scotland)	Defender	(United States) Fresno	Free transfer
Ryan De Vries	(New Zealand)	Forward	(Japan) FC Gifu	Free transfer

Out:

Player	Country	Position	Sold to	Transfer type
Dante Leverock	(Bermuda)	Defender	(Poland) Radomiak Radom	Released
Kris Twardek	(Canada)	Midfielder	(Republic of Ireland) Bohemians	Free transfer
Jack O'Connor	(Republic of Ireland)	Midfielder	(Republic of Ireland) Galway United	Free transfer
Romeo Parkes	(Jamaica)	Forward	(United States) New Mexico United	Loan
Daryl Fordyce	(Northern Ireland)	Midfielder	(Canada) Valour FC	Free transfer
Sam Warde	(Republic of Ireland)	Midfielder	(Republic of Ireland) Galway United	Free transfer

==== Waterford ====
In:

Player	Country	Position	Signed from	Transfer type
Graham Cummins	(Republic of Ireland)	Forward	(Republic of Ireland) Cork City	Free transfer
Sam Bone	(England)	Defender	(Republic of Ireland) Shamrock Rovers	Free transfer
Scott Allardice	(Scotland)	Midfielder	(Republic of Ireland) Bohemians	Free transfer
Tadhg Ryan	(Republic of Ireland)	Goalkeeper	(Republic of Ireland) Cork City	Free transfer
Kevin O'Connor	(Republic of Ireland)	Defender	(England) Preston North End	Loan
Michael O'Connor	(Republic of Ireland)	Forward	(Northern Ireland) Linfield	Loan
Robbie McCourt	(Republic of Ireland)	Midfielder	(Republic of Ireland) Tolka Rovers	Free transfer
Ali Coote	(Scotland)	Midfielder	(England) Brentford	Free transfer
Matty Smith	(Scotland)	Forward	(Scotland) Dundee United	Free transfer
Tyreke Wilson	(Republic of Ireland)	Defender	(England) Manchester City	Free transfer
Brian Murphy	(Republic of Ireland)	Goalkeeper	(Wales) Cardiff City	Free transfer
Akin Odimayo	(England)	Defender	(England) Reading	Loan
Andre Burley	(Saint Kitts and Nevis)	Defender	(England) Reading	Loan
Will Longbottom	(England)	Forward	(England) Doncaster Rovers	Free transfer

Out:

Player	Country	Position	Sold to	Transfer type
Shane Duggan	(Republic of Ireland)	Midfielder	(Republic of Ireland) Galway United	Free transfer
Rory Feely	(Republic of Ireland)	Defender	(Republic of Ireland) St Patrick's Athletic	Free transfer
Walter Figueira	(England)	Forward	(Republic of Ireland) Derry City	Free transfer
Georgie Poynton	(Republic of Ireland)	Midfielder	(Republic of Ireland) Shelbourne	Free transfer
JJ Lunney	(Republic of Ireland)	Midfielder	(Republic of Ireland) Bohemians	Free transfer
Rob Slevin	(Republic of Ireland)	Defender	(Republic of Ireland) Cork City	Free transfer
Dean O'Halloran	(Republic of Ireland)	Midfielder	(Republic of Ireland) Galway United	Free transfer
Colm Whelan	(Republic of Ireland)	Forward	(Republic of Ireland) UCD	Free transfer
Zack Elbouzedi	(Republic of Ireland)	Midfielder	(England) Lincoln City	Free transfer
Cory Galvin	(Republic of Ireland)	Midfielder	(Republic of Ireland) Cork City	Free transfer
John Kavanagh	(Republic of Ireland)	Defender	(Republic of Ireland) Cobh Ramblers	Free transfer
Kenny Browne	(Republic of Ireland)	Defender	Retired	Retirement
Darryl Walsh	(Republic of Ireland)	Defender	(Republic of Ireland) Cobh Ramblers	Free transfer
Maxim Kouogun	(Cameroon)	Defender	(England) Harrogate Town	Free transfer
Tom Holland	(Republic of Ireland)	Midfielder	Free agent	Released
Karolis Chvedukas	(Lithuania)	Midfielder	Free agent	Released
Paul Martin	(Republic of Ireland)	Goalkeeper	Free agent	Released

=== League of Ireland First Division ===
==== Athlone Town ====
In:

Player	Country	Position	Signed from	Transfer type
Ronan Asgari	(Republic of Ireland)	Defender	(Republic of Ireland) Galway United	Free transfer
Joshua Keane Quinlivan	(Republic of Ireland)	Midfielder	(Republic of Ireland) Galway United	Free transfer
Scott Delaney	(Republic of Ireland)	Defender	(Republic of Ireland) Willow Park	Free transfer
Evan O'Connor	(Republic of Ireland)	Defender	(Republic of Ireland) Longford Town	Free transfer
Adam Rooney	(Republic of Ireland)	Defender	(Republic of Ireland) Galway United	Free transfer
Ronan Manning	(Republic of Ireland)	Midfielder	Free agent	Free transfer
Chris Reid	(Republic of Ireland)	Midfielder	(Republic of Ireland) Cherry Orchard	Free transfer
David Brookes	(Republic of Ireland)	Defender	(Republic of Ireland) Cherry Orchard	Free transfer
Joel Coustrain	(Republic of Ireland)	Midfielder	(Republic of Ireland) Shamrock Rovers	Free transfer
Harry Cornally	(Republic of Ireland)	Midfielder	Free agent	Free transfer
Mamoud Mansaray	(Sierra Leone)	Forward	(Republic of Ireland) Calry Bohemians	Free transfer
Evan White	(Republic of Ireland)	Defender	(Northern Ireland) Warrenpoint Town	Free transfer
Dean George	(Republic of Ireland)	Forward	(Republic of Ireland) Wexford	Free transfer

Out:

Player	Country	Position	Sold to	Transfer type
Karl Fitzsimons	(Republic of Ireland)	Midfielder	(Republic of Ireland) Wexford	Free transfer
Kealan Dillon	(Republic of Ireland)	Midfielder	(Northern Ireland) Warrenpoint Town	Free transfer
Aaron Brilly	(Republic of Ireland)	Midfielder	(Republic of Ireland) Leixlip United	Free transfer
Kaleem Simon	(Montserrat)	Midfielder	(Republic of Ireland) Wexford	Free transfer
Dean Casey	(Republic of Ireland)	Midfielder	(Republic of Ireland) Cabinteely	Free transfer
Ciaran Grogan	(Republic of Ireland)	Midfielder	(Republic of Ireland) Cabinteely	Free transfer

==== Bray Wanderers ====
In:

Player	Country	Position	Signed from	Transfer type
Aaron Barry	(Republic of Ireland)	Defender	(Republic of Ireland) Cork City	Free transfer
Tristan Noack-Hofmann	(Germany)	Defender	(Republic of Ireland) Longford Town	Free transfer
Gary Shaw	(Republic of Ireland)	Forward	(Republic of Ireland) St Patrick's Athletic	Free transfer
John Ross Wilson	(Republic of Ireland)	Defender	(Republic of Ireland) Shelbourne	Free transfer
Jack Watson	(Republic of Ireland)	Midfielder	(Republic of Ireland) Cabinteely	Free transfer
Ryan Graydon	(Republic of Ireland)	Midfielder	(Republic of Ireland) Bohemians	Free transfer
Jake Ellis	(Republic of Ireland)	Forward	(Republic of Ireland) Wayside Celtic	Free transfer
Adlane Boulmelh	(Republic of Ireland)	Midfielder	(Republic of Ireland) Bangor GG	Free transfer
Omar Hassan	(Republic of Ireland)	Forward	(Republic of Ireland) Bangor GG	Free transfer
Luke Ryan	(Republic of Ireland)	Defender	(Republic of Ireland) Cabinteely	Free transfer
Stephen Sweeney	(Republic of Ireland)	Midfielder	(Republic of Ireland) Bangor GG	Free transfer
Brian Maher	(Republic of Ireland)	Goalkeeper	(Republic of Ireland) St Patrick's Athletic	Loan

Out:

Player	Country	Position	Sold to	Transfer type
Dylan McGlade	(Republic of Ireland)	Midfielder	(England) Blyth Spartans	Free transfer
Hugh Douglas	(Republic of Ireland)	Defender	(Republic of Ireland) Drogheda United	Free transfer
Gabriel Sava	(Romania)	Goalkeeper	(Northern Ireland) Warrenpoint Town	Free agent
Dean Williams	(Republic of Ireland)	Forward	(Republic of Ireland) Shamrock Rovers	End of loan
Dylan Thornton	(Republic of Ireland)	Midfielder	(Republic of Ireland) Cabinteely	Free transfer
Sean Heaney	(Republic of Ireland)	Defender	Free agent	Released
Philip Gannon	(Republic of Ireland)	Midfielder	Free agent	Released
Jamie Crilly	(Republic of Ireland)	Defender	Free agent	Released

==== Cabinteely ====
In:

Player	Country	Position	Signed from	Transfer type
Michael Kelly	(Republic of Ireland)	Goalkeeper	(Republic of Ireland) Bohemians	Free transfer
Dean Casey	(Republic of Ireland)	Midfielder	(Republic of Ireland) Athlone Town	Free transfer
Lloyd Buckley	(Republic of Ireland)	Defender	(Republic of Ireland) Kilmore Celtic	Free transfer
Lee Murray	(Republic of Ireland)	Midfielder	(United States) Limestone Saints	Free transfer
Corey Chambers	(Republic of Ireland)	Goalkeeper	(Republic of Ireland) Wexford	Free transfer
Ciaran Grogan	(Republic of Ireland)	Midfielder	(Republic of Ireland) Athlone Town	Free transfer
Ryusei Kojima	(Japan)	Midfielder	(Republic of Ireland) Liffey Wanderers	Free transfer
Eoin McPhillips	(Republic of Ireland)	Midfielder	(Republic of Ireland) Drogheda United	Free transfer
Dylan Thornton	(Republic of Ireland)	Midfielder	(Republic of Ireland) Bray Wanderers	Free transfer
Kaito Akimoto	(Japan)	Midfielder	(Republic of Ireland) Portmarnock	Free transfer
Oliver White	(United States)	Forward	(United States) Memphis 901 FC	Free transfer

Out:

Player	Country	Position	Sold to	Transfer type
Rob Manley	(Republic of Ireland)	Forward	(Republic of Ireland) Longford Town	Free transfer
Stephen McGuinness	(Republic of Ireland)	Goalkeeper	(Republic of Ireland) Bohemians	Free transfer
Yuta Sasaki	(Japan)	Forward	(Japan) Iwate Grulla Morioka	Free transfer
Jack Tuite	(Republic of Ireland)	Defender	(Republic of Ireland) Drogheda United	Free transfer
Conor Crowley	(Republic of Ireland)	Midfielder	(Republic of Ireland) Wexford	Free transfer
Luke Ryan	(Republic of Ireland)	Defender	(Republic of Ireland) Bray Wanderers	Free transfer
Jack Watson	(Republic of Ireland)	Midfielder	(Republic of Ireland) Bray Wanderers	Free transfer
Robert McGee	(Republic of Ireland)	Midfielder	(Republic of Ireland) Bangor GG	Free transfer
Seán Hurley	(Republic of Ireland)	Defender	Released	Released
Ross Moloney	(Republic of Ireland)	Forward	Released	Released
Ronan O'Kelly	(Republic of Ireland)	Midfielder	Released	Released
Adam Doyle	(Republic of Ireland)	Midfielder	Released	Released
Jamie Geoghegan	(Republic of Ireland)	Defender	Released	Released
Oisín McMenamin	(Republic of Ireland)	Forward	Released	Released
Adam Maher	(Republic of Ireland)	Defender	Released	Released
James Woods	(Republic of Ireland)	Forward	Released	Released
Robbie Dunne	(Republic of Ireland)	Forward	Released	Released
Karl Manahan	(Republic of Ireland)	Forward	(Republic of Ireland) Wexford	Free transfer

==== Cobh Ramblers ====
In:

Player	Country	Position	Signed from	Transfer type
Pierce Phillips	(Republic of Ireland)	Midfielder	(Republic of Ireland) Cork City	Free transfer
John Kavanagh	(Republic of Ireland)	Defender	(Republic of Ireland) Waterford	Free transfer
Dylan Walsh	(Republic of Ireland)	Defender	(Wales) Dinas Powys	Free transfer
Lee Devitt	(Republic of Ireland)	Forward	(Republic of Ireland) Limerick	Free transfer
Martin Coughlan	(Republic of Ireland)	Midfielder	(Republic of Ireland) Kerry League	Free transfer
Darryl Walsh	(Republic of Ireland)	Defender	(Republic of Ireland) Waterford	Free transfer
Adam Foley	(Republic of Ireland)	Forward	(Republic of Ireland) Limerick	Free transfer
Conor Drinan	(Republic of Ireland)	Forward	(Republic of Ireland) Carrigaline United	Free transfer

Out:

Player	Country	Position	Sold to	Transfer type
Charlie Fleming	(Republic of Ireland)	Defender	(Republic of Ireland) Cork City	Free transfer

==== Drogheda United ====
In:

Player	Country	Position	Signed from	Transfer type
Derek Prendergast	(Republic of Ireland)	Defender	(Republic of Ireland) Shelbourne	Free transfer
Brandon Bermingham	(Northern Ireland)	Forward	(Republic of Ireland) Bohemians	Free transfer
Jack Tuite	(Republic of Ireland)	Defender	(Republic of Ireland) Cabinteely	Free transfer
Hugh Douglas	(Republic of Ireland)	Defender	(Republic of Ireland) Bray Wanderers	Free transfer
Ross Treacy	(Republic of Ireland)	Goalkeeper	(Republic of Ireland) Dundalk	Free transfer
Richie O'Farrell	(Republic of Ireland)	Midfielder	(Republic of Ireland) Drogheda United	Free transfer
David Odumosu	(Republic of Ireland)	Goalkeeper	(Republic of Ireland) Dundalk	Free transfer

Out:

Player	Country	Position	Sold to	Transfer type
Paul Skinner	(Republic of Ireland)	Goalkeeper	Retired	Retirement
Luke McNally	(Republic of Ireland)	Defender	(Republic of Ireland) St Patrick's Athletic	End of loan
Luke Gallagher	(Republic of Ireland)	Defender	Free agent	Released
Kevin Farragher	(Republic of Ireland)	Defender	(Republic of Ireland) Galway United	Free transfer
Jamie Hollywood	(Republic of Ireland)	Midfielder	Free agent	Released
Cian Kavanagh	(Republic of Ireland)	Midfielder	(Republic of Ireland) Wexford	Free transfer
Michael Cregan	(Republic of Ireland)	Forward	(Republic of Ireland) Crumlin United	Free transfer
John Barry	(Republic of Ireland)	Defender	(Republic of Ireland) Tolka Rovers	Free transfer
Ryan Hart	(Republic of Ireland)	Midfielder	(Republic of Ireland) Tolka Rovers	Free transfer
Eoin McPhillips	(Republic of Ireland)	Midfielder	(Republic of Ireland) Cabinteely	Free transfer

==== Galway United ====
In:

Player	Country	Position	Signed from	Transfer type
Shane Duggan	(Republic of Ireland)	Midfielder	(Republic of Ireland) Waterford	Free transfer
Mikey Place	(Republic of Ireland)	Forward	(Republic of Ireland) Finn Harps	Free transfer
Dean O'Halloran	(Republic of Ireland)	Midfielder	(Republic of Ireland) Waterford	Free transfer
Jack O'Connor	(Republic of Ireland)	Midfielder	(Republic of Ireland) Sligo Rovers	Free transfer
Micheál Schlingermann	(Republic of Ireland)	Goalkeeper	Free agent	Free transfer
Joshua Smith	(United States)	Defender	(Republic of Ireland) Finn Harps	Free transfer
Carlton Ubaezuonu	(South Africa)	Midfielder	(Republic of Ireland) Longford Town	Free transfer
Alberto Cabanyes	(Spain)	Midfielder	(Republic of Ireland) Renmore	Free transfer
Timo Parthoens	(Belgium)	Defender	(Finland) HIFK Helsinki	Free transfer
Timmy Molloy	(Republic of Ireland)	Forward	(Republic of Ireland) Salthill Devon	Free transfer
Dylan Sacramento	(Canada)	Defender	(New Zealand) Hawke's Bay United	Free transfer
Kevin Farragher	(Republic of Ireland)	Defender	(Republic of Ireland) Drogheda United	Free transfer
Enda Curran	(Republic of Ireland)	Forward	(Republic of Ireland) Mervue United	Free transfer
Sam Warde	(Republic of Ireland)	Midfielder	(Republic of Ireland) Sligo Rovers	Free transfer

Out:

Player	Country	Position	Sold to	Transfer type
Ronan Asgari	(Republic of Ireland)	Defender	(Republic of Ireland) Athlone Town	Free transfer
Joshua Keane Quinlivan	(Republic of Ireland)	Midfielder	(Republic of Ireland) Athlone Town	Free transfer
Mark Hannon	(Republic of Ireland)	Midfielder	(Northern Ireland) Ballinamallard United	Free transfer
Adam Rooney	(Republic of Ireland)	Defender	(Republic of Ireland) Athlone Town	Free transfer
Ivan Gamarra	(Argentina)	Midfielder	Free agent	Released
Stephen Walsh	(Republic of Ireland)	Defender	(Republic of Ireland) Galway Hibernians	Free transfer

==== Longford Town ====
In:

Player	Country	Position	Signed from	Transfer type
James English	(Republic of Ireland)	Forward	(Republic of Ireland) Shelbourne	Free transfer
Rob Manley	(Republic of Ireland)	Forward	(Republic of Ireland) Cabinteely	Free transfer
Eric Abulu	(Germany)	Defender	(Republic of Ireland) Shamrock Rovers	Free transfer
Matthew O'Brien	(Republic of Ireland)	Midfielder	(Republic of Ireland) Phoenix	Free transfer
Dylan Hand	(Republic of Ireland)	Defender	(Republic of Ireland) Dundalk	Free transfer
Aaron McNally	(Republic of Ireland)	Defender	(Republic of Ireland) Dundalk	Free transfer
Joe Gorman	(Republic of Ireland)	Defender	(Northern Ireland) Cliftonville	Free transfer
Niall Barnes	(Republic of Ireland)	Midfielder	(Republic of Ireland) Bluebell United	Free transfer

Out:

Player	Country	Position	Sold to	Transfer type
Seán Boyd	(Republic of Ireland)	Forward	(Republic of Ireland) Shamrock Rovers	End of loan
Aaron Dobbs	(Republic of Ireland)	Forward	(Republic of Ireland) Shelbourne	Free transfer
Anthony Breslin	(Republic of Ireland)	Defender	(Republic of Ireland) Bohemians	Free transfer
Tristan Noack-Hofmann	(Germany)	Defender	(Republic of Ireland) Bray Wanderers	Free transfer
Conor Kenna	(Republic of Ireland)	Defender	(Republic of Ireland) Kilnamanagh	Free transfer
Paul O'Conor	(Republic of Ireland)	Midfielder	Retired	Retirement
Carlton Ubaezuonu	(South Africa)	Midfielder	(Republic of Ireland) Galway United	Free transfer
Peter Hopkins	(Republic of Ireland)	Midfielder	Free agent	Released
Patrick O'Sullivan	(Republic of Ireland)	Forward	(Republic of Ireland) Wexford	Free transfer
Evan O'Connor	(Republic of Ireland)	Defender	(Republic of Ireland) Athlone Town	Free transfer
Kristian Crawford	(Republic of Ireland)	Midfielder	(Republic of Ireland) Wexford	Free transfer

==== Shamrock Rovers II ====
In:

Player	Country	Position	Signed from	Transfer type
N/A				

Out:

Player	Country	Position	Sold to	Transfer type
N/A				

==== UCD ====
In:

Player	Country	Position	Signed from	Transfer type
Tomás O'Connor	(Republic of Ireland)	Defender	(Republic of Ireland) Limerick	Free transfer
Colm Whelan	(Republic of Ireland)	Forward	(Republic of Ireland) Waterford	Free transfer
Michael Gallagher	(Republic of Ireland)	Midfielder	(Republic of Ireland) Finn Harps	Free transfer
Michael O'Keane	(Republic of Ireland)	Midfielder	(Republic of Ireland) Bohemians	Free transfer

Out:

Player	Country	Position	Sold to	Transfer type
Jason McClelland	(Republic of Ireland)	Midfielder	(Republic of Ireland) St Patrick's Athletic	Free transfer
Liam Scales	(Republic of Ireland)	Defender	(Republic of Ireland) Shamrock Rovers	Free transfer
Conor Kearns	(Republic of Ireland)	Goalkeeper	(Republic of Ireland) St Patrick's Athletic	Free transfer
Richie O'Farrell	(Republic of Ireland)	Midfielder	(Republic of Ireland) Drogheda United	Free transfer
Tom Murphy	(Republic of Ireland)	Goalkeeper	(Republic of Ireland) Wexford	Free transfer
Dan Tobin	(Republic of Ireland)	Defender	(Republic of Ireland) Wexford	Free transfer
Charlie Smith	(Republic of Ireland)	Midfielder	(Republic of Ireland) Wexford	Free transfer
Dan Mullen	(Republic of Ireland)	Defender	(Republic of Ireland) Cherry Orchard	Free transfer
Sam Byrne	(Republic of Ireland)	Forward	Free agent	Released

==== Wexford ====
In:

Player	Country	Position	Signed from	Transfer type
Tom Murphy	(Republic of Ireland)	Goalkeeper	(Republic of Ireland) UCD	Free transfer
Dan Tobin	(Republic of Ireland)	Defender	(Republic of Ireland) UCD	Free transfer
Cian Kavanagh	(Republic of Ireland)	Midfielder	(Republic of Ireland) Drogheda United	Free transfer
Conor Crowley	(Republic of Ireland)	Midfielder	(Republic of Ireland) Cabinteely	Free transfer
Azeez Yussuff	(Republic of Ireland)	Forward	(Republic of Ireland) Lucan United	Free transfer
Karl Fitzsimons	(Republic of Ireland)	Midfielder	(Republic of Ireland) Athlone Town	Free transfer
Malike Benrouguibi	(Republic of Ireland)	Midfielder	(Republic of Ireland) Bluebell United	Free transfer
Patrick O'Sullivan	(Republic of Ireland)	Forward	(Republic of Ireland) Longford Town	Free transfer
Janabi Amour Jr.	(Republic of Ireland)	Midfielder	(Republic of Ireland) Drogheda United	Free transfer
Charlie Smith	(Republic of Ireland)	Midfielder	(Republic of Ireland) UCD	Free transfer
Kristian Crawford	(Republic of Ireland)	Defender	(Republic of Ireland) Longford Town	Free transfer
Craig Giles	(Republic of Ireland)	Defender	(Republic of Ireland) Shelbourne	Free transfer
James Carroll	(Republic of Ireland)	Defender	(Republic of Ireland) Dundalk	Free transfer
Kaleem Simon	(Montserrat)	Midfielder	(Republic of Ireland) Athlone Town	Free transfer
Jack Lydon	(Republic of Ireland)	Goalkeeper	(Republic of Ireland) Shelbourne	Free transfer
Gianpiero Fragnoli	(Italy)	Defender	(Republic of Ireland) Ballymun United	Free transfer
Andrew Farrell	(Republic of Ireland)	Midfielder	(Republic of Ireland) Newbridge Town	Free transfer
Karl Manahan	(Republic of Ireland)	Forward	(Republic of Ireland) Cabinteely	Free transfer
Daniel Tarcevskijs	(Lithuania)	Forward	(Republic of Ireland) Wicklow Rovers	Free transfer
Paul Cleary	(Republic of Ireland)	Defender	(Republic of Ireland) St Patrick's Athletic	Loan

Out:

Player	Country	Position	Sold to	Transfer type
Danny Doyle	(Republic of Ireland)	Forward	(Republic of Ireland) Crettyard United	Free transfer
Corey Chambers	(Republic of Ireland)	Goalkeeper	(Republic of Ireland) Cabinteely	Free transfer
Dean George	(Republic of Ireland)	Forward	(Republic of Ireland) Athlone Town	Free transfer
Joe Walshe	(Republic of Ireland)	Goalkeeper	Free agent	Released
Jason McGuire	(Republic of Ireland)	Goalkeeper	Free agent	Released
Ross Kenny	(Republic of Ireland)	Defender	Free agent	Released
Thomas Croke	(Republic of Ireland)	Midfielder	Free agent	Released
Sean Kelly	(Republic of Ireland)	Midfielder	Free agent	Released
Paddy Cahill	(Republic of Ireland)	Midfielder	Free agent	Released
Ricky Fox	(Republic of Ireland)	Forward	Free agent	Released
John Peare	(Republic of Ireland)	Midfielder	Free agent	Released
Conor Sutton	(Republic of Ireland)	Midfielder	Free agent	Released
Andy Mulligan	(Republic of Ireland)	Midfielder	Free agent	Released
Dave Corish	(Republic of Ireland)	Defender	Free agent	Released
