= 2020 Galway United F.C. season =

Irish football club season

Galway United
2020 season
- Manager: Alan Murphy (until 18 August); John Caulfield (from 20 August)
- Stadium: Eamonn Deacy Park
- First Division: 5th (play-offs)
- FAI Cup: Second round
- League of Ireland Cup: First Round (Competition cancelled)
- Top goalscorer: League: Carlton Ubaezuonu (4); All: Mikey Place, Enda Curran, Carlton Ubaezuonu & Wilson Waweru (4)
Home colours	Away colours

The 2020 Galway United F.C. season was the football club's 42nd season in the League of Ireland and their third consecutive season in the League of Ireland First Division since being relegated in 2017.

The 2020 season was truncated as a result of the Covid-19 Pandemic, with the league season be reduced from 27 games to 18 games and with all of the games after the league came back on 31 July taking place behind closed doors. The 2020 FAI Cup was also delayed and played with less teams than normal. The 2020 League of Ireland Cup was cancelled completely.

During the season club legend and manager of the previous two years Alan Murphy, was sacked following a run of 8 winless games in the league. He would go on to be replaced by former Premier Division winning manager John Caulfield.

The club finished the season in 5th, qualifying for the play-offs where they would defeat Bray Wanderers in the semi-final, before losing 1–2 to Longford Town in the final.

== Squad ==
#	Name	Nationality	Position	Date of birth (age)	Previous Club	Signed	Notes
Goalkeepers
1	Kevin Horgan	(Republic of Ireland)	GK	April 26, 1997 (aged 23)	(Republic of Ireland) Shamrock Rovers	2019	
16	Micheál Schlingermann	(Republic of Ireland)	GK	June 23, 1991 (aged 29)	(Republic of Ireland) Sligo Rovers	2020	
22	Cian Mulryan	(Republic of Ireland)	GK	May 3, 2000 (aged 20)	(Republic of Ireland) Mervue United	2019	
22	Matthew Connor	(Republic of Ireland)	GK	April 8, 1997 (aged 23)	(Republic of Ireland) Waterford	2020	
Defenders
2	Jack Lynch	(Republic of Ireland)	DF	February 2, 1998 (aged 22)	(Republic of Ireland) Regional United	2019	
3	Marc Ludden	(Republic of Ireland)	DF	February 28, 1990 (aged 30)	(Republic of Ireland) Mervue United	2014	Vice-captain
4	Joshua Smith	(United States)	DF	March 10, 1992 (aged 28)	(Republic of Ireland) Finn Harps	2020	
5	Killian Brouder	(Republic of Ireland)	DF	August 20, 1998 (aged 22)	(Republic of Ireland) Limerick	2019	
6	Maurice Nugent	(Republic of Ireland)	DF	July 30, 1998 (aged 22)	(Republic of Ireland) Mervue United	2017	
18	Kevin Farragher	(Republic of Ireland)	DF	June 27, 1993 (aged 27)	(Republic of Ireland) Drogheda United	2020	
21	Christopher Horgan	(Republic of Ireland)	DF	October 27, 1999 (aged 21)	(Republic of Ireland) Salthill Devon	2018	
23	Timo Parthoens	(Belgium)	DF	November 23, 1998 (aged 21)	(Finland) HIFK	2020	
26	Cian Murphy	(Republic of Ireland)	DF	December 25, 1996 (aged 23)	(Republic of Ireland) St. Mary's	2019	
Midfielders
7	Timmy Molloy	(Republic of Ireland)	MF	April 7, 1994 (aged 26)	(Republic of Ireland) Salthill Devon	2020	
8	Shane Duggan	(Republic of Ireland)	MF	March 11, 1989 (aged 31)	(Republic of Ireland) Waterford	2020	Captain
10	Conor Barry	(Republic of Ireland)	MF	September 2, 1995 (aged 25)	(Republic of Ireland) Athlone Town	2017	
11	Shane Doherty	(United States)	MF	August 16, 1996 (aged 24)	(United States) Rowan	2019	
12	Stephen Christopher	(Republic of Ireland)	MF	July 11, 1996 (aged 24)	(Republic of Ireland) Cobh Ramblers	2019	
13	Conor Melody	(Republic of Ireland)	MF	March 15, 1997 (aged 23)	(Republic of Ireland) Salthill Devon	2015	
15	Donal Higgins	(Republic of Ireland)	MF	September 10, 2001 (aged 19)	(Republic of Ireland) Maree Oranmore	2018	
17	Caoilfhionn O’Dea	(Republic of Ireland)	MF	December 11, 2000 (aged 19)	(Republic of Ireland) Newmarket Celtic	2019	
20	Jack O'Connor	(Republic of Ireland)	MF	October 5, 2001 (aged 19)	(Republic of Ireland) Sligo Rovers	2020	
24	Joe Collins	(Republic of Ireland)	MF	January 4, 1994 (aged 26)	(Republic of Ireland) West United	2019	
25	Carlton Ubaezuonu	(South Africa)	MF	April 22, 1998 (aged 22)	(Republic of Ireland) Longford Town	2020	
27	Sam Warde	(Republic of Ireland)	MF	March 13, 1998 (aged 22)	(Republic of Ireland) Sligo Rovers	2020	
Forwards
9	Mikey Place	(Republic of Ireland)	FW	April 9, 1998 (aged 22)	(Republic of Ireland) Finn Harps	2020	
14	Enda Curran	(Republic of Ireland)	FW	June 11, 1992 (aged 28)	(Republic of Ireland) Mervue United	2020	
19	Francely Lomboto	(Republic of Ireland)	FW	July 2, 2000 (aged 20)	(Republic of Ireland) Galway Hibernians	2020	
28	Wilson Waweru	(Republic of Ireland)	FW	December 27, 2000 (aged 19)	(Republic of Ireland) Academy	2018	
29	Vinny Faherty	(Republic of Ireland)	FW	June 13, 1987 (aged 33)	(Cyprus) PAEEK	2019	
Players who departed before the end of the season
11	Dean O'Halloran	(Republic of Ireland)	MF	January 2, 1996 (aged 24)	(Republic of Ireland) Waterford	2020	
17	Alberto Cabanyes	(Spain)	MF	June 21, 1993 (aged 27)	(Italy) Spoltore Calcio	2020	
19	Dylan Sacramento	(Canada)	MF	March 4, 1995 (aged 25)	(Canada) Valour FC	2020	

=== In ===
Date	Position	Nationality	Name	Last club	Ref.
10 November 2019	MF	(Republic of Ireland)	Shane Duggan	(Republic of Ireland) Waterford	
6 December 2019	FW	(Republic of Ireland)	Mikey Place	(Republic of Ireland) Finn Harps	
12 December 2019	MF	(Republic of Ireland)	Jack O'Connor	(Republic of Ireland) Sligo Rovers	
12 December 2019	MF	(Republic of Ireland)	Dean O'Halloran	(Republic of Ireland) Waterford	
14 December 2019	GK	(Republic of Ireland)	Micheál Schlingermann	(Republic of Ireland) Sligo Rovers	
17 December 2019	DF	(United States)	Joshua Smith	(Republic of Ireland) Finn Harps	
20 December 2019	MF	(South Africa)	Carlton Ubaezuonu	(Republic of Ireland) Longford Town	
7 January 2020	DF	(Belgium)	Timo Parthoens	(Finland) HIFK	
7 January 2020	MF	(Spain)	Alberto Cabanyes	(Italy) Spoltore Calcio	
9 January 2020	MF	(Republic of Ireland)	Timmy Molloy	(Republic of Ireland) Salthill Devon	
26 January 2020	DF	(Republic of Ireland)	Kevin Farragher	(Republic of Ireland) Drogheda United	
26 January 2020	MF	(Canada)	Dylan Sacramento	(Canada) Valour FC	
1 February 2020	MF	(Republic of Ireland)	Sam Warde	(Republic of Ireland) Sligo Rovers	
1 February 2020	FW	(Republic of Ireland)	Enda Curran	(Republic of Ireland) Mervue United	
8 August 2020	GK	(Republic of Ireland)	Matthew Connor	(Republic of Ireland) Waterford	

=== Out ===
Date	Position	Nationality	Name	To	Ref.
	FW	(Republic of Ireland)	Conor Layng	(Republic of Ireland) Pike Rovers	
16 January 2020	MF	(Republic of Ireland)	Ronan Asgari	(Republic of Ireland) Athlone Town	
16 January 2020	MF	(Republic of Ireland)	Joshua Keane Quinlivan	(Republic of Ireland) Athlone Town	
16 January 2020	DF	(Republic of Ireland)	Adam Rooney	(Republic of Ireland) Athlone Town	
20 January 2020	MF	(Republic of Ireland)	Mark Hannon	(Northern Ireland) Ballinamallard United	
30 July 2020	MF	(Canada)	Dylan Sacramento	Retired	
11 September 2020	MF	(Spain)	Alberto Cabanyes	(Spain) UD Ourense	

== Club ==
=== Coaching staff ===
==== Alan Murphy (until 18 August) ====
- Manager: Alan Murphy
- Assistant Manager: Colin Fortune
- First Team Coach: Kevin Murphy
- First Team Coach: Keith McTigue
- First Team Coach: Danny Broderick
- First Team Coach: Iarfhlaith Davoren
- Goalkeeping Coach: Gianluca Aimi
- Strength and Conditioning Coach: David Mannion
- Physiotherapist: Ronan Coyle
- Head of Physical Performance: Brian McMorrow

==== John Caulfield (from 20 August) ====
- Manager: John Caulfield
- Assistant Manager: Colin Fortune
- First Team Coach: Johnny Glynn
- First Team Coach: Liam Kearney
- Goalkeeping Coach: Gianluca Aimi
- Physiotherapist: Aidan Slattery

== Competitions ==
=== League of Ireland First Division ===
Going into the season all teams were meant to play each other 3 times throughout the season, meaning that each team would play 27 games. However, after the league season was postponed as a result of the Covid-19 Pandemic, the format changed to each team only playing each other twice leading to an 18-game season.

==== League Table ====
Pos	Team	Pld	W	D	L	GF	GA	GD	Pts	Qualification
3	UCD	18	9	3	6	44	29	+15	30	Qualification to Promotion play-offs
4	Longford Town (P)	18	9	2	7	26	23	+3	29	Qualification to Promotion play-offs
5	Galway United	18	7	6	5	26	19	+7	27	Qualification to Promotion play-offs
6	Cobh Ramblers	18	8	3	7	22	20	+2	27	
7	Cabinteely	18	8	2	8	22	33	−11	26	

Updated to match(es) played on 27 September 2021. Source: SSE Airtricity League, Soccerway
Rules for classification: 1) Points; 2) Goal difference; 3) Goals scored.
(P) Promoted

==== Results summary ====
Overall								Home						Away					
Pld	W	D	L	GF	GA	GD	Pts	W	D	L	GF	GA	GD	W	D	L	GF	GA	GD
18	7	6	5	26	19	+7	27	2	3	4	8	12	−4	5	3	1	18	7	+11

==== Matches ====
Win Draw Loss

29 February 2020 1	Shamrock Rovers II	1–1	Galway United	Tallaght, Dublin 24
15:00 GMT	Kavanagh 69'	Report	Barry 86'	Stadium: Tallaght Stadium; Attendance: 312; Referee: Kevin O'Sullivan

6 March 2020 2	Wexford	0–0	Galway United	Crossabeg, County Wexford
19:45 GMT		Report	Duggan (red card) 85'	Stadium: Ferrycarrig Park; Attendance: 218; Referee: Oliver Moran

31 July 2020 3	Galway United	0–2	Cabinteely	Terryland, County Galway
19:45 GMT		Report	Knight 30'; Barnes 77'	Stadium: Eamonn Deacy Park; Attendance: 0 Referee: Kevin O'Sullivan

3 August 2020 4	Galway United	2–2	Athlone Town	Terryland, County Galway
19:45 GMT	Place 41'; Lomboto 87'	Report	Dogan 22'; Lennon 59'	Stadium: Eamonn Deacy Park; Attendance: 0 Referee: Oliver Moran

8 August 2020 5	Cobh Ramblers	2–2	Galway United	Cobh, County Cork
19:00 GMT	Lyons 63', 89'	Report	Faherty 81'; Lomboto 87'	Stadium: St Colman's Park; Attendance: 0 Referee: Jason Mannix

14 August 2020 6	Galway United	0–1	Longford Town	Terryland, County Galway
19:45 GMT		Report	McCabe 83'	Stadium: Eamonn Deacy Park; Attendance: 0 Referee: Eoghan O'Shea

17 August 2020 7	Drogheda United	1–0	Galway United	Drogheda, County Louth
19:45 GMT	Lyons 12' (pen.)	Report		Stadium: United Park; Attendance: 0 Referee: Alan Patchell

21 August 2020 8	Galway United	0–0	Bray Wanderers	Terryland, County Galway
19:45 GMT		Report	Barry (red card) 80'	Stadium: Eamonn Deacy Park; Attendance: 0 Referee: Jason Mannix

4 September 2020 9	Athlone Town	1–4	Galway United	Lissywollen, Athlone
19:45 GMT	Duffy (yellow card) 35' (yellow-red card) 36'; Dogan 78' (pen.)	Report	Curran 15' (pen.); Place 64', 72'; Faherty 68'	Stadium: Athlone Town Stadium; Attendance: 0 Referee: Oliver Moran

7 September 2020 10	UCD	0–3	Galway United	Belfield, Dublin 4
19:45 GMT	Collins 65' (o.g.)	Report	Curran 55'; Christopher 83'	Stadium: UCD Bowl; Attendance: 0 Referee: Kevin O'Sullivan

11 September 2020 11	Galway United	2–1	Shamrock Rovers II	Terryland, County Galway
19:45 GMT	Duggan 25'; Farragher 90+4'	Report	Leddy 69'	Stadium: Eamonn Deacy Park; Attendance: 0 Referee: Michael Connolly

18 September 2020 12	Galway United	1–0	Wexford	Terryland, County Galway
19:45 GMT	Curran 10'	Report		Stadium: Eamonn Deacy Park; Attendance: 0 Referee: Kevin O’Sullivan

21 September 2020 13	Cabinteely	0–1	Galway United	Blackrock, Dublin 18
19:45 GMT		Report	Ludden (yellow card) 54' (yellow-red card) 68'; Christopher 90+9'	Stadium: Stradbrook Road; Attendance: 0 Referee: Mark Moynihan

25 September 2020 14	Galway United	0–1	Cobh Ramblers	Terryland, County Galway
19:45 GMT	Place (red card) 90'	Report	Turner 9'	Stadium: Eamonn Deacy Park; Attendance: 0 Referee: Gavin Colfer

3 October 2020 15	Longford Town	2–6	Galway United	Longford, County Longford
19:45 GMT	Manley 6'; Evans 33'	Report	Ludden 44', 46'; Ubaezuonu 58', 63', 80'; Waweru 78'	Stadium: Bishopsgate; Attendance: 0 Referee: Alan Patchell

20 October 2020 16	Galway United	1–3	Drogheda United	Terryland, County Galway
19:45 GMT	Waweru 18'; Christopher (red card) 44'	Report	Bermingham 34', 60'; Kane 42'	Stadium: Eamonn Deacy Park; Attendance: 0 Referee: Adriano Reale

24 October 2020 17	Bray Wanderers	0–1	Galway United	Bray, County Wicklow
15:00 GMT		Report	Ubaezuonu 90+3'	Stadium: Carlisle Grounds; Attendance: 0 Referee: Oliver Moran

27 October 2020 18	Galway United	2–2	UCD	Terryland, County Galway
19:45 GMT	Christopher 43'; Duggan 90+3'	Report	Weir 80', 89'	Stadium: Eamonn Deacy Park; Attendance: 0 Referee: Mark Moynihan

==== Play-offs ====
After the final day of the season on 27 October, Galway United found themselves in 6th, one spot away from the play-offs. However, on October 29, an appeal by Wexford led to 4 of their games which had previously been awarded to their opponents as 3–0 wins to be overturned. This caused Cabinteely to drop from 5th to 7th, which meant Galway United took their spot in the play-offs.

===== Semi-final =====
31 October 2020 Semi-final	Bray Wanderers	0–1	Galway United	Bray, County Wicklow
15:00 GMT		Report	Waweru 82'	Stadium: Carlisle Grounds; Attendance: 0 Referee: Eoghan O'Shea

===== Final =====
6 November 2020 Final	Galway United	1–2	Longford Town	Belfield, Dublin 4
19:45 GMT	Brouder 88'	Report	Chambers 43'; Dervin 81'	Stadium: UCD Bowl; Attendance: 0 Referee: Mark Moynihan

=== FAI Cup ===
As the season being stopped and truncated took place before the FAI Cup began, the entire format of the competition was changed from the start. Only the League of Ireland clubs took part in the competition that year, because of this only 19 teams (Note: the 10th team in the First Division that year was Shamrock Rovers II who didn't take part as they couldn't feature in the same competition as Shamrock Rovers) took part meaning that many teams, including Galway United, were given a bye into the second round.

Win Draw Loss

==== Second Round ====
28 August 2020 Second Round	Galway United	2–5	Shelbourne	Terryland, County Galway
19:45 GMT	Place (penalty missed) 19' 73'; Curran 53'	Report	Rooney 33', 84'; Kilduff 71'; Brennan 79'; Dobbs 90+1'	Stadium: Eamonn Deacy Park; Attendance: 0 Referee: Damien MacGraith

=== League of Ireland Cup ===
Unlike the other competitions which were truncated and played behind closed doors, the 2020 League of Ireland Cup was cancelled entirely. So in spite Galway United winning their first round match, they did not advance to the second round as no such round took place.

Win Draw Loss

==== First Round ====
10 March 2020 First Round	Galway United	2–0	Athlone Town	Terryland, County Galway
19:45 GMT	Cabanyes 49'; Waweru 65'	Report		Stadium: Eamonn Deacy Park; Attendance: 350; Referee: Damien MacGraith

=== Friendlies ===
Win Draw Loss

==== Pre-season Friendlies ====
18 January 2020	Sligo Rovers	3–3	Galway United	Sligo, County Sligo
13:00 GMT	Buckley 55'; Trialist A 63'; Coughlan 75' (pen.)	Report	Nugent 25'; Parthoens 57'; Molloy 77' (pen.)	Stadium: The Showgrounds

21 January 2020	Finn Harps	0–2	Galway United	Ballybofey, County Donegal
19:45 GMT		Report	Barry 53'; Place 70'	Stadium: Finn Park

1 February 2020	Galway United	0–1	Shamrock Rovers	Terryland, County Galway
		Report	Kavanagh 69'	Stadium: Eamonn Deacy Park

4 February 2020	Galway United	1–2	St Patrick's Athletic	Athlone, County Westmeath
19:00 GMT	Molloy 75'	Report	Doona 54'; Hale 56'	Stadium: Athlone Town Stadium; Attendance: 100

==== Mid-season Friendlies ====
18 July 2020	Cork City	1–2	Galway United	Turners Cross, Cork
	Murphy 61'	Report	Barry 5'; Lynch 16'	Stadium: Turners Cross

25 July 2020	Galway United	0–2	Sligo Rovers	Terryland, County Galway
		Report	Coughlan 12' (pen.), 63'	Stadium: Eamonn Deacy Park

== Statistics ==
=== Appearances and goals ===
This table shows all of the players who have featured in a first team squad for Galway United this season
Brackets denotes how many of the listed appearances were made as a substitute

No.	Pos.	Player	League		FAI Cup		LOI Cup		Play-offs		Total	
No.	Pos.	Player	Apps	Goals	Apps	Goals	Apps	Goals	Apps	Goals	Apps	Goals
1	GK	(Republic of Ireland) Kevin Horgan	13	0	0	0	0	0	0	0	13	0
2	DF	(Republic of Ireland) Jack Lynch	15(1)	0	0	0	0	0	2	0	17	0
3	DF	(Republic of Ireland) Marc Ludden	13	2	1(1)	0	1	0	2	0	17	2
4	DF	(United States) Joshua Smith	2	0	0	0	0	0	0	0	2	0
5	DF	(Republic of Ireland) Killian Brouder	15(2)	0	1	0	0	0	2	1	18	1
6	DF	(Republic of Ireland) Maurice Nugent	14(4)	0	1	0	1	0	2	0	18	0
7	MF	(Republic of Ireland) Timmy Molloy	13(7)	0	0	0	1	0	2	0	16	0
8	MF	(Republic of Ireland) Shane Duggan	16	2	1	0	1	0	2	0	20	2
9	FW	(Republic of Ireland) Mikey Place	14(1)	3	1	1	0	0	2(1)	0	17	4
10	MF	(Republic of Ireland) Conor Barry	15(7)	1	1(1)	0	0	0	1(1)	0	17	1
11	MF	(Republic of Ireland) Dean O'Halloran	2	0	0	0	0	0	0	0	2	0
11	MF	(United States) Shane Doherty	12(1)	0	1	0	0	0	2	0	15	0
12	MF	(Republic of Ireland) Stephen Christopher	17(5)	3	0	0	0	0	1	0	18	3
13	MF	(Republic of Ireland) Conor Melody	2(2)	0	0	0	0	0	0	0	2	0
14	FW	(Republic of Ireland) Enda Curran	11(2)	3	1	1	0	0	2	0	14	4
15	MF	(Republic of Ireland) Donal Higgins	10(4)	0	1	0	1	0	0	0	12	0
16	GK	(Republic of Ireland) Micheál Schlingermann	3	0	0	0	1	0	2	0	6	0
17	MF	(Spain) Alberto Cabanyes	0	0	0	0	1	1	0	0	1	1
17	MF	(Republic of Ireland) Caoilfhionn O’Dea	1(1)	0	0	0	0	0	0	0	1	0
18	DF	(Republic of Ireland) Kevin Farragher	10(1)	1	1	0	1	0	0	0	12	1
19	MF	(Canada) Dylan Sacramento	0	0	0	0	1	0	0	0	1	0
19	FW	(Republic of Ireland) Francely Lomboto	9(8)	2	0	0	0	0	1(1)	0	10	2
20	MF	(Republic of Ireland) Jack O'Connor	0	0	0	0	1(1)	0	0	0	1	0
21	DF	(Republic of Ireland) Christopher Horgan	7(2)	0	1	0	0	0	0	0	14	0
22	GK	(Republic of Ireland) Cian Mulryan	0	0	0	0	0	0	0	0	0	0
22	GK	(Republic of Ireland) Matthew Connor	3(1)	0	1	0	0	0	0	0	4	0
23	DF	(Belgium) Timo Parthoens	4	0	1	0	1(1)	0	0	0	6	0
24	MF	(Republic of Ireland) Joe Collins	1	0	0	0	0	0	0	0	1	0
25	MF	(South Africa) Carlton Ubaezuonu	14(11)	4	1(1)	0	0	0	1(1)	0	16	4
26	DF	(Republic of Ireland) Cian Murphy	4	0	0	0	1	0	0	0	5	0
27	MF	(Republic of Ireland) Sam Warde	12	0	0	0	0	0	2	0	14	0
28	FW	(Republic of Ireland) Wilson Waweru	10(7)	2	0	0	1	1	2(2)	1	13	4
29	FW	(Republic of Ireland) Vinny Faherty	12(9)	2	1(1)	0	1(1)	0	1(1)	0	15	2

=== Clean sheets ===
No.	Player	League	FAI Cup	LOI Cup	Play-offs	Total		
No.	Player	1	(Republic of Ireland) Kevin Horgan	4	0	0	0	4
16	(Republic of Ireland) Micheál Schlingermann	1	0	1	1	3		
22	(Republic of Ireland) Matthew Connor	2	0	0	0	2		

=== Disciplinary record ===
No.	Player	League			FAI Cup			LOI Cup			Play-offs			Total		
No.	Player	Yellow card	(yellow card) (yellow-red card)	Red card	Yellow card	(yellow card) (yellow-red card)	Red card	Yellow card	(yellow card) (yellow-red card)	Red card	Yellow card	(yellow card) (yellow-red card)	Red card	Yellow card	(yellow card) (yellow-red card)	Red card
8	Shane Duggan	4	0	1	1	0	0	0	0	0	0	0	0	5	0	1
9	Mikey Place	4	0	1	0	0	0	0	0	0	1	0	0	5	0	1
11	Shane Doherty	5	0	0	0	0	0	0	0	0	0	0	0	5	0	0
12	Stephen Christopher	2	0	1	0	0	0	0	0	0	1	0	0	3	0	1
14	Enda Curran	4	0	0	0	0	0	0	0	0	0	0	0	4	0	0
23	Timo Parthoens	3	0	0	0	0	0	1	0	0	0	0	0	4	0	0
6	Maurice Nugent	2	0	0	1	0	0	0	0	0	0	0	0	3	0	0
2	Jack Lynch	2	0	0	0	0	0	0	0	0	0	0	0	2	0	0
3	Marc Ludden	1	1	0	0	0	0	0	0	0	0	0	0	1	1	0
5	Killian Brouder	1	0	0	1	0	0	0	0	0	0	0	0	2	0	0
18	Kevin Farragher	1	0	0	0	0	0	1	0	0	0	0	0	2	0	0
26	Cian Murphy	1	0	0	0	0	0	1	0	0	0	0	0	2	0	0
10	Conor Barry	1	0	0	0	0	0	0	0	0	0	0	0	1	0	0
19	Francely Lomboto	1	0	0	0	0	0	0	0	0	0	0	0	1	0	0
21	Christopher Horgan	1	0	0	0	0	0	0	0	0	0	0	0	1	0	0
24	Joe Collins	1	0	0	0	0	0	0	0	0	0	0	0	1	0	0
27	Sam Warde	1	0	0	0	0	0	0	0	0	0	0	0	1	0	0
29	Vinny Faherty	1	0	0	0	0	0	0	0	0	0	0	0	1	0	0
Totals		36	1	3	3	0	0	3	0	0	2	0	0	44	1	3
