= 2022 League of Ireland First Division =

38th edition of the 2nd tier competition in association football in Ireland

League of Ireland First Division
- Season: 2022
- Dates: 18 February 2022 – 11 November 2022
- Champions: Cork City
- Matches: 144
- Top goalscorer: Phoenix Patterson (17 league goals + 3 playoff goals)
- Total attendance: 178,000
- Average attendance: 1,193
- All statistics correct as of 23 November 2023.

The 2022 League of Ireland First Division season was the 38th season of the League of Ireland First Division, the second tier of the Republic of Ireland's association football league. The title was won by Cork City.

== Overview ==
The First Division has 9 teams. Each side plays each other four times for a total of 32 matches in the season. The team that finishes in first place achieve automatic promotion to the Premier Division. Teams finishing second to fifth place will enter the play-offs to determine the side to contest for a place in the 2023 Premier Division against the ninth placed (second last) Premier Division team.

Declan Carey finished the season with the Golden Boot, scoring 20 goals for City, including a brace on the final day of the season vs Bray.

== Teams ==
Locations of the First Division teams

=== Team changes ===
Bray Wanderers and Cabinteely merged in the pre-season to create a revamped Bray Wanderers. Shelbourne were promoted as 2021 champions and UCD as playoff winners, to the Premier Division. Waterford and Longford Town joined following their relegation from the Premier League at the end of the 2021 season.

=== Additional teams ===
No other teams applied for a First Division Licence.

=== Stadia and locations ===
Team	Location	Stadium	Capacity
Athlone Town	Athlone	Athlone Town Stadium	5,000
Bray Wanderers	Bray	Carlisle Grounds	4,000
Cobh Ramblers	Cobh	St. Colman's Park	3,000
Cork City	Cork	Turners Cross	7,845
Galway United	Galway	Eamonn Deacy Park	5,000
Longford Town	Longford	Bishopsgate	5,097
Treaty United	Limerick	Markets Field	5,000
Waterford	Waterford	RSC	5,160
Wexford	Crossabeg	Ferrycarrig Park	2,500

=== Managerial changes ===
Team	Outgoing manager	Manner of departure	Date of vacancy	Position in table	Incoming manager	Date of appointment
Athlone Town	(Republic of Ireland) Martin Russell	Resigned	10 April 2022	9th	(Republic of Ireland) Dermot Lennon	10 April 2022
Waterford FC	(Republic of Ireland) Ian Morris	Mutual Consent	20 April 2022	5th	(Republic of Ireland) Gary Hunt	20 April 2022
Waterford FC	(Republic of Ireland) Gary Hunt	Permanent Replacement	14 June 2022	4th	(England) Danny Searle	14 June 2022
Cobh Ramblers	(Republic of Ireland) Darren Murphy	Mutual Consent	19 June 2022	8th	(Republic of Ireland) Shane Keegan	19 June 2022

=== Personnel and kits ===
Note: Flags indicate national team as has been defined under FIFA eligibility rules. Players may hold more than one non-FIFA nationality.

Team	Manager	Captain	Kit manufacturer	Shirt sponsor
Athlone Town	(Republic of Ireland) Dermot Lennon	(Republic of Ireland) Micheal Schlingermann	Umbro	Hayden & Co. Solicitors
Bray Wanderers	(Republic of Ireland) Pat Devlin	(Republic of Ireland) Hugh Douglas	Nike	MyClub
Cobh Ramblers	(Republic of Ireland) Shane Keegan	(Republic of Ireland) John Kavanagh	Joma	McCarthy Insurance Group
Cork City	(Republic of Ireland) Colin Healy	(Republic of Ireland) Cian Coleman	Adidas	University College Cork
Galway United	(Republic of Ireland) John Caulfield	(Republic of Ireland) Conor McCormack	O'Neill's	Comer Property Management
Longford Town	(Republic of Ireland) Gary Cronin	(Republic of Ireland) Sam Verdon	Macron	Bishopsgate
Treaty United	(Republic of Ireland) Tommy Barrett	(Republic of Ireland) Jack Lynch	Umbro	Derrin Homes
Waterford	(England) Danny Searle	(Republic of Ireland) Eddie Nolan	Umbro	DG FOODS LTD
Wexford	(Republic of Ireland) Ian Ryan	(Republic of Ireland) Joe Manley	Umbro	Wallace

== League table ==
Pos	Team	Pld	W	D	L	GF	GA	GD	Pts	Qualification
1	Cork City (C, P)	32	20	8	4	63	22	+41	68	Promotion to League of Ireland Premier Division
2	Waterford	32	20	4	8	70	34	+36	64	Qualification for Promotion play-offs
3	Galway United	32	17	9	6	56	29	+27	60	Qualification for Promotion play-offs
4	Longford Town	32	14	10	8	49	41	+8	52	Qualification for Promotion play-offs
5	Treaty United	32	11	11	10	37	43	−6	44	Qualification for Promotion play-offs
6	Wexford	32	10	11	11	45	47	−2	41	
7	Bray Wanderers	32	6	9	17	30	62	−32	27	
8	Athlone Town	32	7	3	22	44	75	−31	24	
9	Cobh Ramblers	32	4	5	23	37	78	−41	17	

Source: League of Ireland, Soccerway
Rules for classification: 1) Points; 2) Goal difference; 3) Goals scored
(C) Champions; (P) Promoted

== Play-offs ==
=== Bracket ===
First Division play-off Semi-finals
26/29 October 2022
Treaty United	1	3	4
Waterford	4	3	7
26/29 October 2022
Longford Town	2	0	2
Galway United	2	3	5

First Division play-off Final
4 November 2022
Waterford	3
Galway United	0

Promotion/relegation play-off
11 November 2022
UCD	1
Waterford	0

=== First Division play-off Semi-finals ===
==== First leg ====
26 October 2022	Treaty United	1–4	Waterford	Limerick
19:45 IST	Enda Curran 62' (pen.)	Report	Phoenix Patterson 5'; Phoenix Patterson 29'; Junior Quitirna 70'; Sean Guerins 90+4' (o.g.)	Stadium: Markets Field; Referee: Damien MacGraith

26 October 2022	Longford Town	2–2	Galway United	Longford
19:45 IST	Jordan Adeyemo 28'; Jordan Adeyemo 54'	Report	Mikie Rowe 49'; Mikie Rowe 61'	Stadium: Bishopsgate; Referee: Kevin O'Sullivan

==== Second leg ====
29 October 2022	Waterford	3–3 (7–4 agg.)	Treaty United	Waterford
19:45 IST	Timi Sobowale 22'; Wassim Aouachria 48' (pen.); Phoenix Patterson 54'	Report	Mark Ludden 9' (pen.); Mark Ludden 26'; Lee Molloy 29'	Stadium: RSC; Attendance: 2,585; Referee: Paul Norton

30 October 2022	Galway United	3–0 (5–2 agg.)	Longford Town	Galway
16:00 IST	David Hurley 24'; Mikie Rowe 90'; Rob Manley 90+4'	Report		Stadium: Eamonn Deacy Park; Referee: Damien McGraith

=== First Division play-off Final ===
4 November 2022	Galway United	0–3	Waterford	County Limerick
19:45 IST		Report	Junior Quitirna 9'; Wassim Aouachria 45+1'; Junior Quitirna 81'	Stadium: Markets Field; Referee: Alan Patchell

=== Promotion/relegation play-off ===
11 November 2022	UCD	1–0	Waterford	County Dublin
19:45 IST	Tommy Lonergan 15'	Report		Stadium: Richmond Park; Attendance: 2,781; Referee: Rob Harvey

== See also ==
- 2022 League of Ireland Premier Division
- 2022 FAI Cup
