= Matthew Connor =

Irish footballer

Personal information
- Date of birth: 8 April 1997 (age 29)
- Place of birth: Tramore, County Waterford, Ireland
- Height: 1.94 m (6 ft 4 in)
- Position: Goalkeeper

Team information
- Current team: Kerry
- Number: 1

Youth career
- –2013: Tramore AFC

Senior career*
| Years | Team | Apps | (Gls) |
| 2014–2015 | Waterford United | 23 | (0) |
| 2016 | Wexford Youths | 0 | (0) |
| 2016 | Cork City | 0 | (0) |
| 2017–2019 | Waterford | 64 | (0) |
| 2020 | Galway United | 3 | (0) |
| 2021 | Waterford | 3 | (0) |
| 2022 | Galway United | 0 | (0) |
| 2023–2024 | Waterford | 0 | (0) |
| 2023 | → Bray Wanderers (loan) | 12 | (0) |
| 2025 | Athlone Town | 17 | (0) |
| 2025– | Kerry | 23 | (0) |

International career
| 2014 | Republic of Ireland U17 | 2 | (0) |
| 2014 | Republic of Ireland U18 | 1 | (0) |
- * Club domestic league appearances and goals as of 3 August 2026 (UTC)

Matthew Connor (born 8 April 1997) is an Irish professional footballer who plays as a goalkeeper for League of Ireland First Division club Kerry.

Connor played youth football with Tramore AFC before starting his professional career with Waterford United. He has gone on to play in the League of Ireland for Wexford Youths, Cork City, Galway United, Bray Wanderers and Athlone Town.

== Club career ==
=== Waterford United ===
On 16 May 2014, Connor made his debut for League of Ireland First Division club Waterford United in a 3–1 win away against Wexford Youths at Ferrycarrig Park.

Connor was Waterford's first-choice keeper in the 2015 season, making 18 appearances in the season when he was only a teenager.

=== Wexford Youths ===
On 11 January 2016, Connor signed for newly promoted League of Ireland Premier Division side Wexford Youths.

=== Cork City ===
On 9 July 2016, Connor joined Cork City midway through the 2016 season. His first game for the club came in a friendly against EFL Championship side Fulham. Connor featured on the bench for Cork in their Europa League qualifiers and in the 2016 FAI Cup final where Cork beat Dundalk 1–0 at the Aviva Stadium.

=== Waterford ===
Ahead of the 2017 season, Connor re-joined Waterford. He went on to be the club's number 1 following an injury to Ian McLoughlin. In his first season back with the club, Waterford won the First Division for the first time in 15 years and were back in the Premier Division for the first time in a decade.

Connor re-signed for the 2018 season where Waterford finished 4th but didn't pass UEFA's "three-year rule". In the 2019 season, Connor played 34 games in the league keeping 11 clean sheets.

=== Galway United ===
On 6 August 2020, Connor signed for League of Ireland First Division club Galway United as a replacement for the injured Micheál Schlingermann. After less than two moths Connor left the club after Schlingermann had returned from his injury.

=== Waterford ===
On 13 January 2021, Connor returned to Waterford after a year away. In the 2021 season Waterford were relegated after losing to UCD in the play-offs.

=== Galway United ===
On 2 March 2022, Connor signed for Galway United for a second time, reuniting with his former Cork City manager John Caulfield, where he would be the second choice keeper behind Conor Kearns.

=== Waterford ===
On 3 January 2023, Connor joined his hometown club Waterford for the fourth time in his career. In his first season back with the club, Waterford got promoted back to the Premier Division via the play-offs.

==== Bray Wanderers (loan) ====
On 29 July 2023, Connor joined Bray Wanderers on loan for the remainder of the 2023 season.

==== Return from loan ====
On 24 June 2024, Connor started in the Munster Senior Cup final, as Waterford defeated Kerry 2–1 at Turners Cross.

=== Athlone Town ===
On 25 December 2024, Connor signed for League of Ireland First Division club Athlone Town.

=== Kerry ===
On 29 July 2025, Connor signed for fellow First Division club Kerry, playing under his former Cork City teammate Colin Healy. Connor was in goals as Kerry came back 0–3 down to defeat Premier Division side Sligo Rovers 4–3 in the FAI Cup quarter-finals.

== International career ==
Connor played for the Republic of Ireland at youth international level. On 31 March 2014, Connor started in a U17 Euros qualifier against Georgia.

== Career statistics ==
=== Club ===
As of match played 15 August 2026

Appearances and goals by club, season and competition
| Club | Season | League | | | National cup (Note: Includes FAI Cup) | | League cup (Note: Includes League of Ireland Cup) | | Continental | | Other | | Total | |
| Club | Season | Division | Apps | Goals | Apps | Goals | Apps | Goals | Apps | Goals | Apps | Goals | Apps | Goals |
|---|---|---|---|---|---|---|---|---|---|---|---|---|---|---|
| Waterford United | 2014 | LOI First Division | 5 | 0 | 0 | 0 | 1 | 0 | — | | — | | 6 | 0 |
| Waterford United | 2015 | LOI First Division | 18 | 0 | 1 | 0 | 0 | 0 | — | | 0 (Note: Appearance(s) in Munster Senior Cup) | 0 | 19 | 0 |
| Waterford United | Total | | 23 | 0 | 1 | 0 | 1 | 0 | 0 | 0 | 0 | 0 | 25 | 0 |
| Wexford Youths | 2016 | LOI Premier Division | 0 | 0 | 0 | 0 | 1 | 0 | — | | 3 (Note: Appearance(s) in Leinster Senior Cup) | 0 | 4 | 0 |
| Cork City | 2016 | LOI Premier Division | 0 | 0 | 0 | 0 | 0 | 0 | 0 (Note: Appearances in the Europa League) | 0 | — | | 0 | 0 |
| Waterford | 2017 | LOI First Division | 20 | 0 | 0 | 0 | 3 | 0 | — | | — | | 23 | 0 |
| Waterford | 2018 | LOI Premier Division | 10 | 0 | 0 | 0 | 1 | 0 | — | | — | | 11 | 0 |
| Waterford | 2019 | LOI Premier Division | 34 | 0 | 3 | 0 | 2 | 0 | — | | 1 | 0 | 40 | 0 |
| Waterford | Total | | 64 | 0 | 3 | 0 | 6 | 0 | 0 | 0 | 1 | 0 | 74 | 0 |
| Galway United | 2020 | LOI First Division | 3 | 0 | 1 | 0 | 0 | 0 | — | | 0 | 0 | 4 | 0 |
| Waterford | 2021 | LOI Premier Division | 3 | 0 | 1 | 0 | — | | — | | 0 | 0 | 4 | 0 |
| Galway United | 2022 | LOI First Division | 0 | 0 | 2 | 0 | — | | — | | 0 | 0 | 2 | 0 |
| Waterford | 2023 | LOI First Division | 0 | 0 | 0 | 0 | — | | — | | 0 | 0 | 0 | 0 |
| Waterford | 2024 | LOI Premier Division | 0 | 0 | 1 | 0 | — | | — | | 2 | 0 | 3 | 0 |
| Waterford | Total | | 0 | 0 | 1 | 0 | 0 | 0 | 0 | 0 | 2 | 0 | 3 | 0 |
| Bray Wanderers (loan) | 2023 | LOI First Division | 12 | 0 | 1 | 0 | — | | — | | 0 | 0 | 13 | 0 |
| Athlone Town | 2025 | LOI First Division | 17 | 0 | 0 | 0 | — | | — | | 0 | 0 | 17 | 0 |
| Kerry | 2025 | LOI First Division | 7 | 0 | 2 | 0 | — | | — | | 0 | 0 | 9 | 0 |
| Kerry | 2026 | LOI First Division | 16 | 0 | 1 | 0 | — | | — | | 1 | 0 | 18 | 0 |
| Kerry | Total | | 23 | 0 | 2 | 0 | 0 | 0 | 0 | 0 | 1 | 0 | 26 | 0 |
| Career total | | | 145 | 0 | 13 | 0 | 8 | 0 | 0 | 0 | 7 | 0 | 173 | 0 |

== Honours ==
Cork City

- FAI Cup: 2016

Waterford

- League of Ireland First Division: 2017
- Munster Senior Cup: 2023–24
