= Dylan Sacramento =

Canadian soccer player (born 1995)

Personal information
- Full name: Dylan Cabral Sacramento
- Date of birth: March 4, 1995 (age 31)
- Place of birth: Winnipeg, Manitoba, Canada
- Height: 1.70 m (5 ft 7 in)
- Position: Midfielder

Youth career
- Clifton
- Toronto FC

College career
Years	Team	Apps	(Gls)
2013	York Lions	6	(4)
2015–2017	Florida Gulf Coast Eagles	39	(12)

Senior career*
Years	Team	Apps	(Gls)
2014	Toronto FC III		(6)
2015	K–W United	8	(0)
2018	Vaughan Azzurri	11	(10)
2019	Valour FC	18	(1)
2019	→ Hawke's Bay United (loan)	8	(3)
2020	Galway United	0	(0)

International career^{‡}
2013	Canada U18	2	(0)
- * Club domestic league appearances and goals as of December 21, 2019 ‡ National team caps and goals as of May 2, 2019

Dylan Cabral Sacramento (born March 4, 1995) is a Canadian soccer player who plays as a midfielder.

== Club career ==
=== Toronto FC ===
In 2012, Sacramento played with TFC Academy II in the Canadian Soccer League's second division. After the conclusion of the season, he was nominated for the league's rookie of the year. He later played with Toronto FC Senior Academy in the inaugural season of League1 Ontario. He notably scored the first goal in the league's history.

=== K–W United ===
Sacramento joined PDL club K–W United FC for the 2015 season. The club would capture the PDL Championship that year.

=== Vaughan Azzurri ===
Sacramento returned to League1 Ontario for the 2018 season, signing with the Vaughan Azzurri. He finished the season with 10 goals in 11 games and 4 goals in 4 playoff games, including the game-winner in the final to help Vaughan capture the League1 Championship. At the end of the season, Sacramento would be named League1 MVP.

=== Valour FC ===
In December 2018, Sacramento signed with Valour FC of the Canadian Premier League. He made his debut against Pacific FC on May 1, 2019. On September 15, 2019, he scored his first professional goal in a 4–2 win over York9. On October 7, 2019, Sacramento was granted an early leave from the club to pursue an opportunity in New Zealand.

=== Hawke's Bay United ===
On October 31, 2019, Sacramento went on loan with New Zealand Football Championship side Hawke's Bay United. In his short stint with the club, he had four assists in eight games.

=== Galway United ===
On January 26 2020, Sacramento signed with Irish club Galway United for the 2020 season. He made his debut in a 2020 League of Ireland Cup match against Athlone Town. He departed the club in July, just prior to the re-starting of the league following the postponement due to the COVID-19 pandemic.
