= 2020 FAI Cup =

Extra.ie FAI Cup

Tournament details
- Country: Republic of Ireland; Northern Ireland
- Venue(s): Aviva Stadium, Dublin
- Dates: 10 August 2020 – 6 December 2020
- Teams: 19

Final positions
- Champions: Dundalk (12th title)
- Runners-up: Shamrock Rovers

Tournament statistics
- Matches played: 18
- Goals scored: 67 (3.72 per match)
- Top goal scorer: David McMillan (8 goals)

The 2020 FAI Cup was the 100th edition of the Republic of Ireland's primary national cup competition. This edition featured clubs exclusively from the League of Ireland Premier Division and the First Division, whereas usually non-league teams are involved. The number of teams was reduced due to the ongoing Coronavirus pandemic. The restrictions also meant that crowds were restricted or prohibited from attending. The competition began on 10 August 2020 with the first of four rounds and concluded on 6 December 2020 with the final at the Aviva Stadium in Dublin, a neutral venue, which has hosted the final since 2010.

The Cup holders were Premier Division side Shamrock Rovers and they again reached the final where they were defeated 4-2 by Dundalk after extra-time.

The winners of the FAI Cup earns automatic qualification for the 2021–22 UEFA Europa Conference League and would begin play in the first qualifying round. If they have already qualified for European competition through position in the 2020 Premier Division, the spot will go to league's fourth place finisher Sligo Rovers.

== First round ==
The draw for the first round took place on 13 July 2020. Thirteen teams were drawn out to receive a bye into the second round and will join the winners of the first round matches.
Teams in bold advanced to the Second Round.

| Premier Division | First Division |
|---|---|
| **Bohemians**^{[Bye]}; **Cork City**; **Derry City**^{[Bye]}; **Dundalk**; **Finn Harps**; **Shamrock Rovers**^{[Bye]}; **Shelbourne**^{[Bye]}; **Sligo Rovers**^{[Bye]}; St Patrick's Athletic; Waterford | **Athlone Town**^{[Bye]}; **Bray Wanderers**^{[Bye]}; **Cabinteely**^{[Bye]}; **Cobh Ramblers**^{[Bye]}; **Drogheda United**^{[Bye]}; **Galway United**^{[Bye]}; Longford Town; **UCD**^{[Bye]}; **Wexford**^{[Bye]} |

| 10 August 2020 | **Finn Harps** | **1–0** | St Patrick's Athletic | Ballybofey |
| 19:45 GMT | Ryan Connolly 5'; David Webster (yellow card) 19'; Adrian Delap (yellow card) 74'; Mark Coyle (yellow card) 82' | Report | Darragh Markey (yellow card) 34'; David Titov (yellow card) 77' | Stadium: Finn Park; Attendance: N/A; Referee: Neil Doyle |
Note: Live coverage on www.watchloi.ie

| 11 August 2020 | **Dundalk** | **1–0** | Waterford | Dundalk |
| 19:45 GMT | Seán Hoare 17' | Report | Kurtis Byrne (yellow card) 80' | Stadium: Oriel Park; Attendance: N/A; Referee: Paul McLoughlin |
Note: Live coverage on www.watchloi.ie

| 11 August 2020 | **Cork City** | **1–0** (a.e.t.) | Longford Town | Cork |
| 19:45 GMT | Graham Cummins (red card) 67'; Ricardo Dinanga (yellow card) 94'; Ricardo Dinanga 120+1' | Report | | Stadium: Turners Cross; Attendance: N/A; Referee: Ray Matthews |
Note: Live coverage on www.watchloi.ie

== Second round ==
The draw for the second round took place on 12 August 2020 and was broadcast live on the Football Association Ireland Facebook page with Republic of Ireland senior manager Stephen Kenny conducting proceedings. 6 of the 8 games from the second round will be shown live on the new streaming service WATCHLOI.

Teams in bold advanced to the quarter-finals.

| Premier Division | First Division |
|---|---|
| **Bohemians**; Cork City; **Derry City**; **Dundalk**; **Finn Harps**; **Shamrock Rovers**; **Shelbourne**; **Sligo Rovers** | **Athlone Town**; Bray Wanderers; Cabinteely; Cobh Ramblers; Drogheda United; Galway United; UCD; Wexford |

| 28 August 2020 | **Athlone Town** | **5–3** (a.e.t.) | Wexford | Athlone |
| 19:45 GMT | Lee Duffy (yellow card) 37'; Ronan Manning 52'; Taner Dogan 54'; Scott Delaney (yellow card) 66'; Scott Delaney 80'; Lee Duffy (yellow card) (red card) 94'; Jack Reynolds (yellow card) 102'; Adam Lennon 103'; Bradley Okaidja (yellow card) 118' | Report | Jack Doherty 18' (pen.); Conor English 20'; Tom Murphy (yellow card) 52'; James Carroll 67'; James Carroll (yellow card) 83'; Karl Manahan 90+1' (o.g.) | Stadium: Athlone Town Stadium; Attendance: N/A; Referee: Michael Connolly |

| 28 August 2020 | Galway United | **2–5** | **Shelbourne** | Galway |
| 19:45 GMT | Enda Curran (yellow card) 14'; Maurice Nugent (yellow card) 35'; Enda Curran 53'; Michael Place 73' | Report | Colin McCabe (yellow card) 18'; Dayle Rooney 33'; Ciarán Kilduff 71'; Daniel Byrne (yellow card) 76'; Ryan Brennan 79'; Georgie Poynton (yellow card) 80'; Dayle Rooney 84'; Aaron Dobbs 90' | Stadium: Eamonn Deacy Park; Attendance: N/A; Referee: Damien MacGraith |
Note: Live coverage on www.watchloi.ie

| 29 August 2020 | Drogheda United | **0–2** | **Derry City** | Drogheda |
| 17:00 GMT | Jake Hyland (yellow card) 13'; Mark Hughes (yellow card) 25'; Chris Lyons (yellow card) 69' | Report | Conor McCormack (yellow card) 13'; Ibrahim Meite (yellow card) 65'; Joe Thomson (yellow card) 70'; Ciaron Harkin 89'; Stephen Mallon 90' | Stadium: United Park; Attendance: N/A; Referee: Derek Tomney |
Note: Live coverage on www.watchloi.ie

| 29 August 2020 | Bray Wanderers | **0–2** | **Finn Harps** | Bray |
| 19:45 GMT | Killian Cantwell (yellow card) 50'; Paul Keegan (red card) 50'; Ryan Graydon (yellow card) 61' | Report | Alexander Kogler 12'; Alexander Kogler 30'; Mark Russell (yellow card) 38'; Ryan Connolly (yellow card) 62' | Stadium: Carlisle Grounds; Attendance: N/A; Referee: Rob Hennessy |

| 30 August 2020 | Cobh Ramblers | **0–2** | **Dundalk** | Cobh |
| 17:00 GMT | Lee Devitt (yellow card) 70'; Greg Henry (yellow card) 71' | Report | Dane Massey 29'; David McMillan 75' (pen.) | Stadium: St Colman's Park; Attendance: N/A; Referee: Alan Patchell |
Note: Live coverage on www.watchloi.ie

| 30 August 2020 | UCD | **1–3** | **Sligo Rovers** | Belfield, Dublin |
| 19:45 GMT | Paul Doyle 8'; Michael Gallagher (yellow card) 58' | Report | Kyle Callan-McFadden 16'; Ryan De Vries (yellow card) 23'; Ronan Coughlan 67'; Jesse Devers 80'; Niall Morahan (yellow card) 84'; Teemu Penninkangas (yellow card) 90' | Stadium: UCD Bowl; Attendance: N/A; Referee: Adriano Reale |
Note: Live coverage on www.watchloi.ie

| 31 August 2020 | **Shamrock Rovers** | **2–1** | Cork City | Tallaght, Dublin |
| 17:45 GMT | Daniel Lafferty 38'; Graham Burke (yellow card) 42'; Gary O'Neill (yellow card) 48'; Daniel Lafferty 68'; Dylan Watts (yellow card) 78' | Report | Charlie Fleming (yellow card) 20'; Gearóid Morrissey 48'; Connor Simpson (yellow card) 62'; Henry Ochieng (yellow card) 83' | Stadium: Tallaght Stadium; Attendance: N/A; Referee: Neil Doyle |
Note: Live coverage on www.watchloi.ie

| 31 August 2020 | **Bohemians** | **2–0** | Cabinteely | Phibsborough, Dublin |
| 19:45 GMT | Promise Omochere 32'; Dinny Corcoran 41' | Report | Paul Fox (yellow card) 21'; Alex Aspil (yellow card) 50' | Stadium: Dalymount Park; Attendance: N/A; Referee: Robert Harvey |
Note: Live coverage on www.watchloi.ie

== Quarter-finals ==
The draw for the quarter-finals took place on 18 September 2020 after the league game of Sligo Rovers vs. Bohemians live on RTÉ2. Former Sligo Rovers FAI Cup winning captain Conor O'Grady drew the games.

| Premier Division | First Division |
|---|---|
| Bohemians; Derry City; Dundalk; Finn Harps; Shamrock Rovers; Shelbourne; Sligo Rovers | Athlone Town |

| 31 October 2020 | Athlone Town | 4–1 | Shelbourne | Athlone |
| 15:00 | Dean George 4'; Scott Delaney 20'; Ciaran Grogan (yellow card) 49'; Dean George 66'; Dean George 78'; Dean George (yellow card) 78' | Report | Ciaran Kilduff 8'; Alex O'Hanlon (yellow card) 45+1'; Dan Byrne (yellow card) 59'; Oscar Brennan (yellow card) 83' | Stadium: Athlone Town Stadium; Attendance: N/A; Referee: Damien McGrath |
Note: Live coverage on www.watchloi.ie

| 20 November 2020 | Finn Harps | 2–3 | Shamrock Rovers | Ballybofey |
| 17:30 | Barry McNamee 15'; Stephen Folan 21'; Mark McGinley (yellow card) 54' | Report | Joey O'Brien (yellow card) 41'; Aaron McEneff (penalty missed) 51' (pen.); Aaron McEneff 52' (pen.); Aaron McEneff 55' (pen.); Graham Burke 71'; Thomas Oluwa (yellow card) 89' | Stadium: Finn Park; Attendance: N/A; Referee: Rob Hennessey |
Note: Live coverage on www.watchloi.ie

| 20 November 2020 | Bohemians | 1–4 | Dundalk | Phibsborough, Dublin |
| 19:45 | Andre Wright 15' (pen.); Rob Cornwall (yellow card) 27'; Conor Levingston (yellow card) 41'; Michael Barker (yellow card) 57'; Michael Barker (yellow card) 72' (red card) | Report | Michael Duffy 2'; Cameron Dummigan (yellow card) 10'; Chris Shields (yellow card) 26'; David McMillan 35' (pen.); David McMillan 38'; Nathan Oduwa 87' | Stadium: Dalymount Park; Attendance: N/A; Referee: Robert Harvey |
Note: Live coverage on RTÉ2

| 25 November 2020 | Sligo Rovers | 0–0 (a.e.t.) (3–1 p) | Derry City | Sligo |
| 19:30 | David Cawley (yellow card) 31'; Garry Buckley (yellow card) 55'; Regan Donelon (yellow card) 77' | Report | Ciaran Coll (yellow card) 50'; Conor McCormack (yellow card) 120' | Stadium: The Showgrounds; Attendance: N/A; Referee: Neil Doyle |
| | Penalties |
| | Ronan Coughlan (penalty scored); Junior Ogedi-Uzokwe (penalty missed); Alex Cooper (penalty scored); Garry Buckley (penalty scored) | | (penalty scored) Conor Clifford; (penalty missed) Conor McCormack; (penalty missed) Walter Figueira; (penalty missed) Ibrahim Meite |
Note: Live coverage on www.watchloi.ie

== Semi-finals ==
The draw for the semi-finals took place at 6pm on 30 October 2020 live on RTE 2FM.

| Premier Division | First Division |
|---|---|
| Shamrock Rovers; Dundalk; Sligo Rovers | Athlone Town |

| 29 November 2020 | Shamrock Rovers | 2–0 | Sligo Rovers | Tallaght, Dublin |
| 14:00 | Aaron McEneff 4'; Ronan Finn (yellow card) 40'; Aaron McEneff 45+1' | Report | David Cawley (yellow card) 26'; Ronan Coughlan (yellow card) 82' | Stadium: Tallaght Stadium; Attendance: N/A; Referee: Paul McLaughlin |
Note: Live coverage on www.watchloi.ie

| 29 November 2020 | Athlone Town | 0–11 | Dundalk | Athlone |
| 19:05 | David Brookes (yellow card) 34'; Scott Delaney (yellow card) 47'; Ciaran Grogan (yellow card) 63'; Dean George (yellow card) 88' | Report | Michael Duffy 4' 9'; Andy Boyle 13'; John Mountney 29'; Patrick McEleney 36'; David McMillan 39' 64'; Chris Shields 55'; Nathan Oduwa 60'; Jordan Flores 74'; Sean Murray 83' (yellow card) 70' | Stadium: Athlone Town Stadium; Attendance: N/A; Referee: Rob Hennessey |
Note: Live coverage on RTÉ2

== Final ==
| 6 December 2020 | Shamrock Rovers | 2–4 (a.e.t.) | Dundalk | Ballsbridge, Dublin |
| 18:40 | Dylan Watts (yellow card) 16'; Joey O'Brien (yellow card) 45+3'; Aaron Greene 49'; Liam Scales (yellow card) 71'; Roberto Lopes 74'; Graham Burke (yellow card) 98' | Report | Greg Sloggett (yellow card) 64'; David McMillan 69', 72' (pen.), 117'; Chris Shields (yellow card) 97'; Brian Gartland (yellow card) 105'; Seán Hoare 111' | Stadium: Aviva Stadium; Attendance: 0 Referee: Rob Harvey |
Note: Live coverage on RTÉ2
