= Marc Ludden =

Irish footballer (born 1990)

Personal information
- Date of birth: 28 February 1990 (age 36)
- Place of birth: Brussels, Belgium
- Height: 1.79 m (5 ft 10 in)
- Position: Full-back

Team information
- Current team: Salthill Devon

Youth career
- 2001: Corofin United
- 2001–2009: Mervue United

Senior career*
Years	Team	Apps	(Gls)
2009–2013	Mervue United	119	(5)
2014–2020	Galway United	154	(11)
2021–2023	Treaty United	72	(10)
2024–	Salthill Devon		
- * Club domestic league appearances and goals

Marc Ludden (born 28 February 1990) is an Irish footballer who plays as a Full-back for Galway & District League club Salthill Devon.

Ludden is best known for his time playing in the League of Ireland where he had extensive stints with Mervue United, Galway United and Treaty United.

== Early life ==
Ludden was born in Brussels, Belgium as his father was working in the city. When he was 11 his family moved back to their hometown of Corofin.

Ludden won an All-Ireland Féile championship with Corofin GAA in 2004.

== Career ==
=== Mervue United ===
On 20 March 2009, Ludden made his debut for League of Ireland First Division club Mervue United, in a 1–1 draw with Finn Harps at Terryland Park. Ludden would go on to start a majority of Mervue's games that season. On 23 May 2009, Ludden scored his first ever goal for the club in a 2–2 draw with Athlone Town at the Athlone Town Stadium.

On 7 October 2010, Ludden scored for Mervue against rivals Salthill Devon, as Mervue went on to win the game 2–1 which would go on to secure their survival finishing four points above Salthill in the relegation zone at the end of the 2010 season.

On 13 April 2013, Ludden scored and was one of three Mervue players sent off in a remarkable 3–5 defeat at the hands of Cobh Ramblers. On 19 July 2013, Ludden scored in a 4–0 victory over Finn Harps. Ludden captained Mervue many times that season, as the club made it to the play-offs. Mervue would go on to lose to Longford Town on penalties in the play-offs, in what would be the club's last game in the League of Ireland until 2026.

=== Galway United ===
On 17 December 2013, Ludden signed for newly League of Ireland First Division side Galway FC. Ludden would play in almost every game for the club that season, including playing the full 90 minutes in all four play-off games, as the club was promoted to the Premier Division.

In the 2015 season, Ludden played his first season of Premier Division football, with the club now renamed back to Galway United. During the season Ludden suffered a concussion which ruled him out for multiple games. Ludden would play a key role as Galway would survive one spot above the relegation zone in their first season back in the Premier Division.

That season Galway United made it to the League of Ireland Cup final, where they took on St Patrick's Athletic at Eamonn Deacy Park. Ludden played the full 120 minutes as the game ended 0–0 after extra-time, with Galway going on to lose on penalties.

On 14 May 2016, Ludden scored his first ever Premier Division goal. He did it by scoring from 40 yards out in a 2–1 win over Bray Wanderers at the Carlisle Grounds. A goal which Ludden himself later admitted was a “fluke”.

On 22 September 2017, Ludden scored in 3–1 victory over Sligo Rovers in the connacht derby. At the end of the season Galway would be relegated at the hands of a 3–4 defeat against Dundalk at Eamonn Deacy Park. In the 2017 season, Galway finished 10th out of 12 teams which in a normal season would mean Galway had survived. However, in that season the league had a change in format which meant the bottom three teams were relegated.

On 13 December 2017, Ludden re-signed with Galway United ahead of his second stint with the club in the First Division. On 4 May 2018, Ludden scored in 3–0 away win over Athlone Town. Later the same month on 20 May, Ludden scored in 2–1 away win over Cabinteely.

On 13 September 2019, Ludden scored four goals in one game, in a 7–1 victory over Cobh Ramblers.

On 3 October 2020, Ludden scored 2 goals and got an assist in a 6–2 over Longford Town at Bishopsgate. At the end of the 2020 season Galway United made the play-offs. The defeated Bray Wanderers 1–0 in the semi-finals, however they lost 1–2 to Longford Town in the final.

=== Treaty United ===
At the start of 2021, Ludden signed for League of Ireland First Division club Treaty United in their first season as a club. On 30 July 2021, Ludden scored his first goal for the club in a 4–1 win away against Athlone Town. Treaty United ended the season by qualifying for the play-offs, where they would lose 2–4 on aggregate to UCD. That season Ludden was included in the PFAI First Division Team of the Year.

Ludden re-signed for the 2022 season, where he would begin regularly captaining the side. On 20 May 2022, Ludden scored two goals in a 2–2 draw with Cobh Ramblers. That season, Ludden played an important role as Treaty made a surprising run to the FAI Cup semi-finals.

On 19 December 2022, Ludden once again re-signed with Treaty United for the 2023 season, being officially named as the club's captain. Ludden went on to score 5 goals that season despite missing many games through injury, as the club missed out on the play-offs by three points. That season Ludden made his 400th appearance in senior football.

On 10 January 2024, Ludden announced his retirement from League of Ireland football.

=== Salthill Devon ===
Since 2024, Ludden has been playing for Galway & District League side Salthill Devon.

Ludden played in all three games as Salthill made it the furthest of any non League of Ireland team in the 2025 FAI Cup. Which included wins over Liffey Wanderers and St. Michael's before losing to Ludden's former club Galway United in the Round of 16.

== Personal life ==
Ludden's brother, Ryan Ludden played in the League of Ireland First Division with Salthill Devon during the 2013 season.

== Career statistics ==
=== Club ===
Appearances and goals by club, season and competition
Club	Season	League			National cup (Note: Includes FAI Cup)		League cup (Note: Includes League of Ireland Cup)		Other		Total	
Club	Season	Division	Apps	Goals	Apps	Goals	Apps	Goals	Apps	Goals	Apps	Goals
Mervue United	2009	LOI First Division	28	2	1	0	0	0	—		29	2
Mervue United	2010	LOI First Division	20	1	0	0	1	0	—		21	1
Mervue United	2011	LOI First Division	27	0	1	0	1	0	—		29	0
Mervue United	2012	LOI First Division	19	0	2	0	0	0	—		21	0
Mervue United	2013	LOI First Division	25	2	0	0	1	0	2 (Note: Appearances in 2013 promotion/relegation play-offs)	0	28	2
Mervue United	Total		119	5	4	0	3	0	2	0	128	5
Galway United	2014	LOI First Division	25	0	1	0	1	0	4 (Note: Appearances in 2014 promotion/relegation play-offs)	0	31	0
Galway United	2015	LOI Premier Division	20	0	1	0	2	0	—		23	0
Galway United	2016	LOI Premier Division	19	1	1	0	3	0	—		23	1
Galway United	2017	LOI Premier Division	31	1	2	0	3	0	—		36	1
Galway United	2018	LOI First Division	23	2	2	0	2	0	—		27	2
Galway United	2019	LOI First Division	23	5	2	0	2	0	—		27	5
Galway United	2020	LOI First Division	13	2	1	0	1	0	2 (Note: Appearances in 2020 promotion/relegation play-offs)	0	17	2
Galway United	Total		154	11	10	0	14	0	6	0	184	11
Treaty United	2021	LOI First Division	25	1	1	0	—		2 (Note: Appearances in 2021 promotion/relegation play-offs)	0	28	1
Treaty United	2022	LOI First Division	30	4	3	0	—		3 (Note: 2 Appearances and 2 goals in 2022 promotion/relegation play-offs, 1 Appearance in Munster Senior Cup)	2	36	6
Treaty United	2023	LOI First Division	27	5	1	0	—		1 (Note: Appearance in Munster Senior Cup)	0	29	5
Treaty United	Total		72	10	5	0	0	0	6	2	83	12
Salthill Devon	2024–25	Galway & District League	—		3	0	—		—		3	0
Career total			345	26	22	0	17	0	14	2	398	28

== Honours ==
Galway United

- League of Ireland Cup; runner up: 2015

Salthill Devon

- Galway & District League Premier Division: 2024–25
