= Shane Duggan =

Irish footballer (born 1989)

Personal information
- Date of birth: 11 March 1989 (age 37)
- Place of birth: Garryowen, Limerick, Ireland
- Height: 1.71 m (5 ft 7 in)
- Position: Midfielder

Team information
- Current team: Fairview Rangers

Youth career
- Cork City
- 2007–2008: Plymouth Argyle

Senior career*
Years	Team	Apps	(Gls)
2008	UCD	13	(0)
2009–2013	Cork City	133	(21)
2014–2018	Limerick	144	(16)
2019	Waterford	33	(5)
2020–2021	Galway United	27	(2)
2021–	Fairview Rangers		

International career
2010	Republic of Ireland U23	1	(0)
- * Club domestic league appearances and goals

Shane Duggan (born 11 March 1989) is an Irish footballer who plays as a midfielder for Limerick & District League club Fairview Rangers.

Duggan is best known for his time in the League of Ireland where he played for UCD, Cork City, Limerick, Waterford and Galway United.

== Youth career ==
Duggan played youth football for EFL Championship club Plymouth Argyle, never making a senior appearance for the club.

== Club career ==
=== UCD ===
On 3 August 2008, Duggan made his debut for League of Ireland Premier Division side UCD, starting against St Patrick's Athletic at the UCD Bowl.

=== Cork City ===
In February 2009, Duggan signed for fellow Premier Division side Cork City. At the end of the season Cork City finished 3rd in the league, however they received a winding up order which saw them administratively relegated to the First Division.

On 26 March 2010, Duggan scored a hat-trick in a 4–2 victory over Mervue United at Turners Cross. At the end of the 2010 season with Cork City having barely survived as a club, Duggan was named in the PFAI First Division Team of the Year alongside teammate Graham Cummins.

The next season Cork City won the First Division and were promoted, with Duggan and Cummins once again making the PFAI First Division Team of the Year. In 2011, Cork City made it to the League of Ireland Cup final where Duggan played the full 90 minutes as Cork lost 0–1 to Derry City at Turners Cross.

On 5 April 2013, Duggan scored an 89th-minute winner against his former club UCD to secure a 2–1 victory at Turners Cross. On 29 April, Duggan repeated the feat, scoring a 93rd-minute winner against Bray Wanderers to leave the Carlisle Grounds with a 2–1 victory.

=== Limerick ===
On 30 October 2013, Duggan signed for his hometown club, the newly promoted Premier Division side Limerick. Upon joining the club Duggan was named club captain.

On 28 February 2015, Duggan scored in extra-time of the Munster Senior Cup semi-final against his former club Cork City, in a game which Limerick would go on to win on penalties, before winning the final against Avondale United. At the end of the 2015 season Limerick were relegated after losing the Promotion/relegation playoff 1–2 on aggregate to Finn Harps.

In the 2016 season, Limerick won the First Division by 23 points gaining promotion back to the Premier Division, in a season where Duggan once again made the PFAI First Division Team of the Year. In the same season Limerick made it to the League of Ireland Cup final where they lost 1–4 to St Patrick's Athletic at Markets Field.

On 7 October 2017, Duggan scored a 95th-minute equaliser against St Patrick's Athletic to leave Richmond Park with a 2–2 draw and to keep Limerick above St Pats in the league.

At the end of the 2018 season Limerick were once again relegated after losing the Promotion/relegation playoff 1–2 on aggregate to Finn Harps. After this Duggan left the club after five seasons as club captain.

=== Waterford ===
On 30 November 2018, Duggan signed for League of Ireland Premier Division club Waterford for the 2019 season. During his only season at the club Duggan scored 6 goals as Waterford had a comfortable mid-table finish.

=== Galway United ===
On 10 November 2019, Duggan signed for League of Ireland First Division club Galway United for the 2020 season, where upon his arrival he was named club captain. At the end of the 2020 season the club made the play-offs on the final day thanks to a 93rd-minute equaliser from Duggan against UCD at Eamonn Deacy Park. During the play-offs they would defeat Bray Wanderers in the semi-final, before losing to Longford Town in the final. In his only full season at Galway United he won the club's Player of the Year award and was included in the PFAI First Division Team of the Year.

Duggan re-signed for the 2021 season, during which time his captaincy was given to new signing Conor McCormack.

=== Fairview Rangers ===
On 10 August 2021, Duggan signed for Limerick & District League club Fairview Rangers.

== International career ==
On 28 September 2010, Duggan played for the Republic of Ireland U23s in a game against Estonia, in a game which Ireland won 1–0 in Tallinn.

== Career statistics ==
=== Club ===
Appearances and goals by club, season and competition
Club	Season	League			National cup (Note: Includes FAI Cup)		League cup (Note: Includes League of Ireland Cup)		Other		Total	
Club	Season	Division	Apps	Goals	Apps	Goals	Apps	Goals	Apps	Goals	Apps	Goals
UCD	2008	LOI Premier Division	13	0	0	0	0	0	—		13	0
Cork City	2009	LOI Premier Division	16	2	2	1	2	0	—		20	3
Cork City	2010	LOI First Division	30	4	3	0	2	0	—		35	4
Cork City	2011	LOI First Division	27	6	3	0	4	0	1 (Note: Appearance(s) in the Munster Senior Cup)	0	35	6
Cork City	2012	LOI Premier Division	29	3	2	0	1	0	1	0	33	3
Cork City	2013	LOI Premier Division	31	6	2	0	2	1	—		35	7
Cork City	Total		133	21	12	1	11	1	2	0	158	23
Limerick	2014	LOI Premier Division	30	3	1	0	1	0	—		32	3
Limerick	2015	LOI Premier Division	30	3	1	0	1	0	4 (Note: 2 Appearances and 1 goal in the Munster Senior Cup and 2 Appearances in the 2015 Promotion/relegation playoffs)	1	36	4
Limerick	2016	LOI First Division	20	5	1	0	4	1	1	0	26	6
Limerick	2017	LOI Premier Division	30	2	2	1	0	0	1	0	33	3
Limerick	2018	LOI Premier Division	34	3	2	0	1	0	2 (Note: Appearances in the 2018 Promotion/relegation playoffs)	0	36	0
Limerick	Total		144	16	7	1	7	1	8	1	166	19
Waterford	2019	LOI Premier Division	33	5	3	1	3	0	—		39	6
Galway United	2020	LOI First Division	16	2	1	0	1	0	2 (Note: Appearances in the 2020 Promotion/relegation playoffs)	0	20	2
Galway United	2021	LOI First Division	11	0	0	0	—		—		11	0
Galway United	Total		27	2	1	0	1	0	2	0	31	2
Fairview Rangers	2024–25	Limerick & District League	—		1	0	—		—		1	0
Career total			350	44	24	3	22	2	12	1	408	50

== Honours ==
Cork City

- League of Ireland First Division: 2011
- League of Ireland Cup; runner up: 2011

Limerick

- League of Ireland First Division: 2016
- League of Ireland Cup; runner up: 2016
- Munster Senior Cup: 2014–15

Fairview Rangers

- Limerick & District League Premier Division: 2024–25
- FAI Junior Cup: 2024–25
