= Carlton Ubaezuonu =

South African footballer (born 1998)

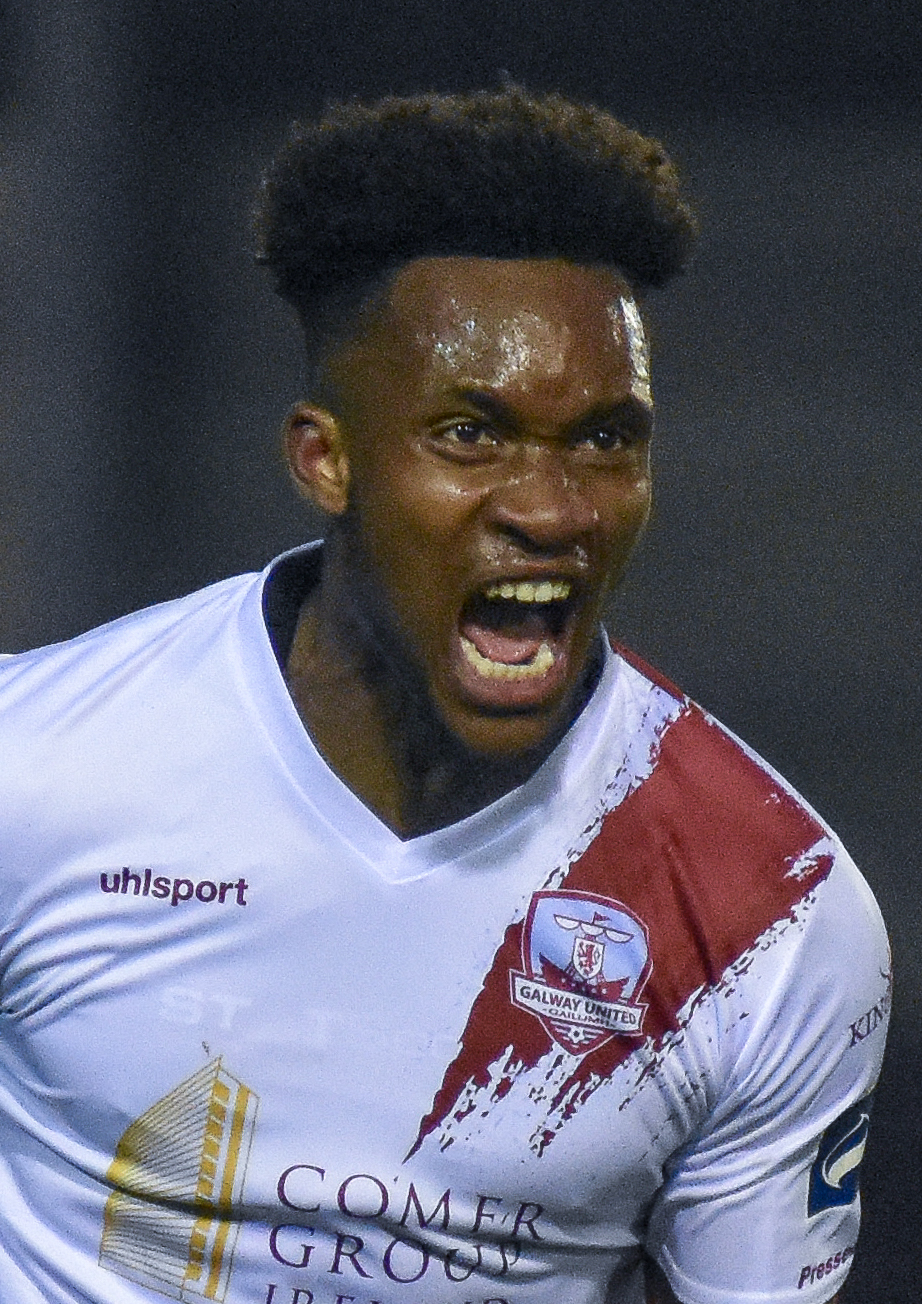
- Ubaezuonu celebrates a goal for Galway United (2018)

Personal information
- Date of birth: 22 April 1998 (age 28)
- Place of birth: Johannesburg, South Africa
- Height: 1.81 m (5 ft 11 in)
- Position: Winger

Team information
- Current team: King's Lynn Town
- Number: 9

Youth career
- Lough Harps
- –2017: Dundalk

Senior career*
Years	Team	Apps	(Gls)
2017–2019	Dundalk	4	(0)
2018	→ Galway United (loan)	27	(4)
2019–2020	Longford Town	5	(0)
2020–2021	Galway United	24	(4)
2022	Athlone Town	15	(4)
2022–2023	Farsley Celtic	4	(5)
2023–2024	Chorley	15	(15)
2024–2026	Scunthorpe United	25	(10)
2026–	King's Lynn Town	0	(0)
- * Club domestic league appearances and goals

Carlton Ubaezuonu (born 22 April 1998) is a South African born footballer who plays as a winger or centre-forward for National League North club King's Lynn Town.

He began his career with Dundalk and would go on to also play for Galway United, Longford Town, Athlone Town, Farsley Celtic, Chorley and Scunthorpe United.

== Early life ==
Born in Johannesburg, South Africa, Ubaezuonu is from Ballyhaunis, County Mayo. He played for Lough Harps in County Roscommon at youth level.

== Career ==
=== Dundalk ===
Ubaezuonu started his senior career with Dundalk. His first senior start came in a 5–0 win for Dundalk against Crumlin United in the FAI Cup, providing an assist and being awarded the player of the match award. Ubaezuonu made his league debut for Dundalk on 25 October 2016, in a 2–5 away defeat against St Patrick's Athletic. The 18-year-old started the match but was eventually replaced by Dean Shiels at half time. While playing for the under-19 side, he won the U19 League in 2017.

==== Galway United (loan) ====
On 16 January 2018 Ubaezuonu signed for League of Ireland First Division side Galway United on a half-season loan. The loan was then later extended to a season-long loan.

=== Longford Town ===
On 21 December 2019, Ubaezuonu left Dundalk to join League of Ireland First Division club Longford Town. At his time with Longford Town, he made only 5 appearances due to struggles with injuries.

=== Return to Galway United ===
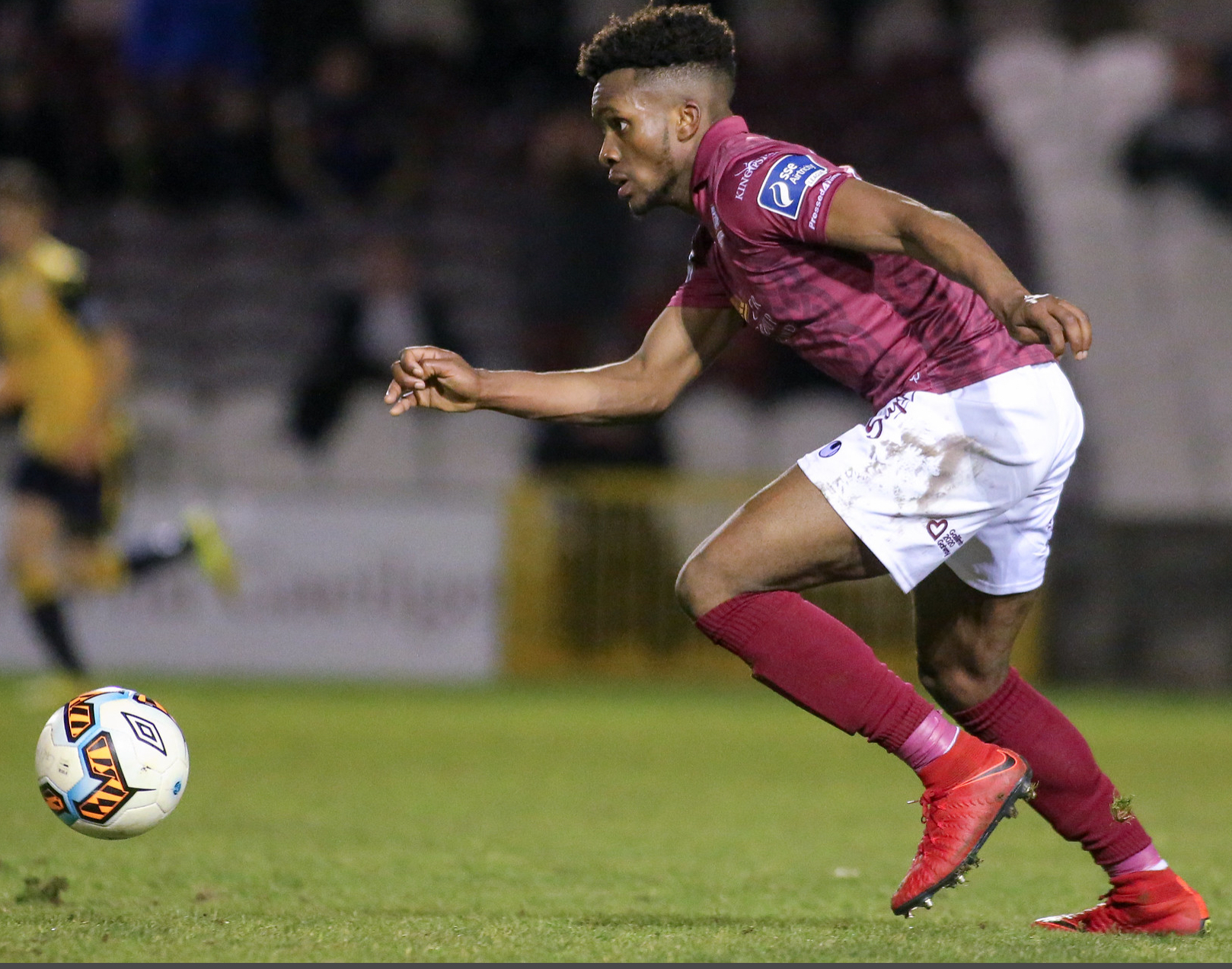
Ubaezuonu with Galway United.

On 20 December 2019, it was announced that Ubaezuonu would be returning to Galway United for the 2020 season, this time on a permanent basis. On 4 October 2020, Ubaezuonu scored a hat trick in a 6–2 win against his former club Longford Town, after coming onto the game as a substitute at half-time. On 22 November 2020, he signed a contract extension with Galway, keeping him at the club until 2022.

=== Chorley ===
On 28 June 2023, following a spell with Farsley Celtic, it was announced that Ubaezuonu would be signing for National League North side Chorley. On 26 November 2023, Ubaezuonu scored a 97th minute equaliser in a game against Boston United. In his only season with the club, he would be the top goal scorer for Chorley with 15 goals.

=== Scunthorpe United ===
On 27 May 2024, it was announced that Ubaezuonu had joined Scunthorpe United. He scored the winning goal in a 4–2 win against his former club Chorley, scoring in the 67th minute after coming off the bench at half-time. In the National League North play-offs, Ubaezuonu scored the winning goal for Scunthorpe in the extra time, gaining his team promotion to the National League. On 6th December 2025, Ubaezuonu scored a two times to help Scunthorpe come from a goal down and beat Tamworth 3–1 in the National League, scoring the winning goal in the 75 minute of the game.

=== King's Lynn Town ===
On 10 March 2026, Ubaezuonu joined National League North side King's Lynn Town on a multi-year deal.

== Honors ==
- 2024–25 National League North play-offs: Winners.
