= Taner Dogan =

American soccer player (born 1998)

Personal information
- Full name: Taner Arman Dogan
- Date of birth: May 30, 1998 (age 28)
- Place of birth: United States
- Position: Midfielder

Team information
- Current team: Holywell Town
- Number: 8

College career
Years	Team	Apps	(Gls)
2016–2019	Harvard Crimson	53	(5)

Senior career*
Years	Team	Apps	(Gls)
2020–2021	Dundalk	0	(0)
2020	→ Athlone Town (loan)	16	(3)
2021	→ Forward Madison (loan)	0	(0)
2023	Cray Wanderers	2	(0)
2023	Eastbourne Borough	1	(0)
2023–2024	Margate	4	(0)
2025	Hastings United	7	(1)
2026	Bala Town	6	(0)
2026–	Holywell Town	13	(0)
- * Club domestic league appearances and goals as of 05:45, 10 October 2026 (UTC)

Taner Arman Dogan (born May 30, 1998) is an American soccer player who plays as a midfielder for Holywell Town in the Cymru Premier.

== Early life ==
Dogan attended Harvard University, where he studied economics. He captained the Crimson soccer team.

== Career ==
Dogan signed for League of Ireland Premier Division side Dundalk in 2020 after graduating from Harvard. He then joined League of Ireland First Division side Athlone Town on loan for the 2020 season. In August 2021, he signed for American side Forward Madison on loan for the remainder of the 2021 USL League One Season.

In 2023, he signed for English side Cray Wanderers before having further spells with Eastbourne Borough and Margate. In 2025, Dogan signed for Hastings United and scored on his debut against Cray Valley PM on March 1, 2025.

Welsh Premier League side Bala Town announced the signing of Dogan in February 2026. He made his Cymru Premier debut for the club on February 13, 2026, against Haverfordwest County.

In July 2026, Dogan signed for Holywell Town ahead of the Cymru Premier season.

== Style of play ==
Dogan operates as a midfielder. He is known for his passing ability.

== Personal life ==
Dogan was born to a Turkish father. He has lived in San Diego and is a native of St Louis.
