= Alexander Kogler =

Austrian association football player

Personal information
- Date of birth: 1 February 1998 (age 28)
- Place of birth: Oberwart, Austria
- Height: 1.90 m (6 ft 3 in)
- Position: Forward

Youth career
- 2005–2007: FC Kärnten
- 2007–2008: Austria Kärnten
- 2008-2013: Wacker Innsbruck
- 2014-2016: Rot-Weiß Erfurt
- 2016–2017: Ingolstadt 04

Senior career*
Years	Team	Apps	(Gls)
2017–2018	Ingolstadt 04 II	27	(5)
2018-2019	Wacker Innsbruck II	17	(3)
2019–2020	Grazer AK	10	(0)
2020	Finn Harps	14	(1)
- * Club domestic league appearances and goals as of 20 November 2020

Alexander Kogler (born 1 February 1998) is an Austrian footballer who plays as a striker.

== Career ==
Kogler started his career at FC Kärnten. In 2007 he switched to SK Austria Kärnten. In 2008 he moved to the youth team of FC Wacker Innsbruck. In 2013 he came to AKA Carinthia. In 2014 he moved to Germany at FC Rot-Weiß Erfurt.

For the 2016/17 season, he joined the U-19 team of FC Ingolstadt 04. He made his debut for Ingolstadt's second team in the Regionalliga in July 2017 when he started against FC Bayern Munich's second team on the first day of the 2017/18 season. On his debut, however, he received a red card in the 43rd minute and was sent off. He scored his first goal for Ingolstadt II in September 2017 in a 2–1 win against the second team of 1. FC Nürnberg. At the end of the season he had 27 appearances in the regional league, in which he scored five goals.

For the 2018/19 season, he returned to Austria and joined the second team of FC Wacker Innsbruck. He made his debut in the 2nd division in July 2018 when he started against FC Juniors OÖ on the first day of the 2018/19 season and was replaced by Robert Martić in the 70th minute. In the game that Innsbruck won 3–0, Kogler scored to make it 1–0.

After relegation at Wacker II, he switched to second division Grazer AK for the 2019/20 season. He made 10 appearances in the first half of the season in the Austrian Football Second League before departing the club to sign for Irish side Finn Harps F.C.

In February 2020, Kogler signed for Finn Harps in the League of Ireland Premier Division. He scored twice for the Donegal side in their FAI Cup second round clash with Bray Wanderers. He left the club at the end of 2020.

== Personal life ==
Kogler is the son of former Austria international footballer Walter Kogler.
