= Tom Holland (footballer, born 1997) =

English footballer

Personal information
- Full name: Thomas Holland
- Date of birth: 22 April 1997 (age 29)
- Place of birth: Leeds, England, United Kingdom
- Position: Midfielder

Youth career
- Bradford City
- Leeds United
- 201?–2015: Manchester City

Senior career*
Years	Team	Apps	(Gls)
2015–2017	Swansea City	0	(0)
2016	→ Eastleigh (loan)	0	(0)
2017	→ AFC Fylde (loan)	1	(0)
2017–2019	The New Saints	58	(6)
2019–2020	Waterford	13	(1)
2020–2022	The New Saints	21	(0)
2022	Guilsfield	3	(0)
2022	Airbus UK Broughton	0	(0)
Total		96	(7)

International career
2013–2014	Republic of Ireland under-17s	7	(1)
2016	Republic of Ireland under-19s	2	(1)
- * Club domestic league appearances and goals

Thomas Holland (born 22 April 1997), more often known as Tom Holland, is an English born former professional footballer who played as a Midfielder. He has represented the Republic of Ireland at youth international level.

== Early life and education ==
Holland was born on 22 April 1997, in Leeds. He completed his schooling at St. Menston Catholic School. He spent time in the youth teams of Bradford City, Leeds United and Manchester City where he earned a deal to join the under-18 squad in July 2013.

== Club career ==
In July 2015 Holland signed his first professional contract with Swansea City. Whilst at the club he had loan spells with National League sides Eastleigh in 2016 and AFC Fylde in 2017.

In 2017, Holland signed a two-year contract with The New Saints, who were the champions of the Welsh Premier League at that time.

After his contract ended with New Saints in 2019, Holland joined Waterford playing the latter half of the season in the Irish Premier Division.

In February 2020 he returned to The New Saints for a second spell with the club.

In January 2022 he joined Cymru North club Guilsfield. Later that year he joined Airbus UK Broughton in June, ahead of the 2022–23 season but departed the club the following month without playing a competitive game.

== International career ==
Holland qualified to play for the Republic of Ireland as his grandfather was from Cavan. Having been selected to play for the Irish under-16 national side in a 2013 tournament in Italy he was subsequently called up to the under-17 national side in 2013. He made seven appearances. Then in 2016, he became part of the under-19 side.

== Honours ==
The New Saints

- Welsh Premier League: 2017–18, 2018–19
- Welsh League Cup: 2017-18
