= 2020 League of Ireland Cup =

47th season of the League of Ireland's secondary knockout competition

EA Sports Cup

Tournament details
- Country: Ireland
- Dates: 8 March – 10 March
- Teams: 22

Final positions
- Champions: N/A – Competition abandoned
- Runners-up: N/A – Competition abandoned

Tournament statistics
- Matches played: 4
- Goals scored: 14 (3.5 per match)
- Top goal scorer(s): Joe Doyle & Craig Walsh – 2 goals

The 2020 League of Ireland Cup was the 47th season of the League of Ireland's secondary knockout competition. The EA Sports Cup features teams from the SSE Airtricity League Premier and First Divisions, as well as some intermediate level teams. The competition was deferred indefinitely on March 20 by the Football Association of Ireland as a result of the Coronavirus pandemic.

== First round ==
All ten teams from the League of Ireland First Division, with the exception of Shamrock Rovers II, enter the competition at this stage. One representative from the Leinster Senior League. the Munster Senior League and the Ulster Senior League enter at this point also. The draw for the first round was made on 18 February with fixtures originally set for 9 and 10 March.

8 March 2020	Cabinteely	4–3 (a.e.t.)	Crumlin United	Blackrock, Dublin
15:30 GMT	Kaito Akimoto 1'; Eoin McPhillips 15'; Dean Casey 109'; Oliver White 119'	Report	Stephen Larkin 19'; Craig Walsh 34' (pen.) 103'	Stadium: Stradbrook Road; Attendance: 150 (est.); Referee: Robert Dowling

10 March 2020	UCC	1–1 (a.e.t.) (3–4 p)	Cobh Ramblers	Cork
19:30 GMT	Owen Collins 107'	Report	Cian Leonard 105'	Stadium: The Mardyke; Attendance: 200 (est.); Referee: Kevin O'Sullivan
	Penalties
	Daniel Pender (penalty scored); James Sheehan (penalty missed); Daniel Pender (penalty missed); Gordon Walker (penalty scored); Rian O'Sullivan (penalty scored)		David Hurley (penalty missed); Cian Leonard (penalty scored); Pierce Phillips (penalty scored); Adam Foley (penalty scored); Charlie Lyons (penalty scored)

10 March 2020	Galway United	2–0	Athlone Town	Galway
19:45 GMT	Alberto Cabanyes 49'; Wilson Waweru 65'	Report		Stadium: Eamon Deacy Park; Attendance: 350 (est.); Referee: Damien McGraith

10 March 2020	Wexford	1–2 (a.e.t.)	Bray Wanderers	Wexford
19:45 GMT	Janabi Amour 55'	Report	Joe Doyle 90+3' 108'	Stadium: Ferrycarrig Park; Attendance: 150 (est.); Referee: Alan Patchell

Cancelled	Longford Town	C–C	Cockhill Celtic	Longford
				Stadium: Bishopsgate

Cancelled	Drogheda United	C–C	UCD	Drogheda
				Stadium: United Park

== Second round ==
All Premier Division teams were due to enter at the second round stage of the competition.

== Top scorers ==
Rank	Player	Club	Goals
1	(Republic of Ireland) Joe Doyle	Bray Wanderers	2
1	(Republic of Ireland) Craig Walsh	Crumlin United	2
3	(Republic of Ireland) Owen Collins	UCC	1
3	(Republic of Ireland) Cian Leonard	Cobh Ramblers	1
3	(Republic of Ireland) Wilson Waweru	Galway United	1
3	(Republic of Ireland) Janabi Amour	Wexford	1
3	(Spain) Alberto Cabanyes	Galway United	1
3	(United States) Oliver White	Cabinteely	1
3	(Republic of Ireland) Dean Casey	Cabinteely	1
3	(Republic of Ireland) Stephen Larkin	Crumlin United	1
3	(Republic of Ireland) Eoin McPhillips	Cabinteely	1
3	(Japan) Kaito Akimoto	Cabinteely	1
