= Enda Curran =

Irish footballer (born 1992)

Personal information
- Date of birth: 11 June 1992 (age 34)
- Place of birth: Galway, Ireland
- Position: Forward

Team information
- Current team: Salthill Devon

Youth career
- Salthill Devon
- Mervue United

Senior career*
Years	Team	Apps	(Gls)
2010	Mervue United	7	(3)
2011	Galway United	4	(0)
2012–2013	Salthill Devon	38	(17)
2013	Athlone Town	8	(4)
2013–2014	Derry City	12	(2)
2014–2016	Galway United	55	(16)
2017	Longford Town	16	(6)
2017	Athlone Town	4	(1)
2018–2020	Mervue United		
2020	Galway United	13	(3)
2021	Mervue United		
2022–2024	Treaty United	64	(30)
2025–	Salthill Devon		
- * Club domestic league appearances and goals as of 6 September 2024

Enda Curran (born 11 June 1992) is an Irish professional footballer who plays as a forward for Salthill Devon. He has also played for League of Ireland sides such as Derry City, Galway United, Longford Town and Athlone Town.

== Career ==
Curran started his career at local Galway side Mervue United. In his debut season for the club in the 2010 League of Ireland First Division he played seven games and scored three goals as the club narrowly avoided the relegation play-offs.

Curran then transferred to Galway United in 2011 for a season, but only made four appearances in total before transferring to League of Ireland First Division team Salthill Devon for two seasons, finishing bottom of the league both years, although scoring 17 goals over the course of his spell there, finishing by far as the club's highest goalscorer for the two seasons.

The next season Curran was signed by Premier Division team Derry City the next year. Curran scored the winner in a league match against Sligo Rovers to give Derry their first win of the season. Curran was then released the next month, along with teammate Mark Stewart.

=== Galway United (second spell) ===
Curran re-signed for Galway United in 2014, while the club was in the First Division, and rarely played in the first season, making four appearances and scoring one goal, as the club achieved promotion. The next season however, he netted a career-best of 13 goals in 26 games, scoring a hat-trick in a 5–0 win over Bray Wanderers. The next season, Curran only scored 3 goals in 24 appearances, and left at the end of the season.

=== Treaty United ===
After leaving Galway for the second time, Curran moved to Longford Town and Athlone Town, then back to Mervue United and Galway United for the 2020 season, before moving to Limerick team Treaty United in 2022. Curran scored two on his debut for The Shannonsiders in a 5–1 win over Wexford Youths, Curran followed that up with a goal against his old side Galway United and another against Waterford In an FAI Cup match against UCD Curran sent Treaty into their first FAI Cup semi-final with a hat-trick over The Students in a 4–1 win.
