= Micheál Schlingermann =

Irish soccer player and Gaelic footballer

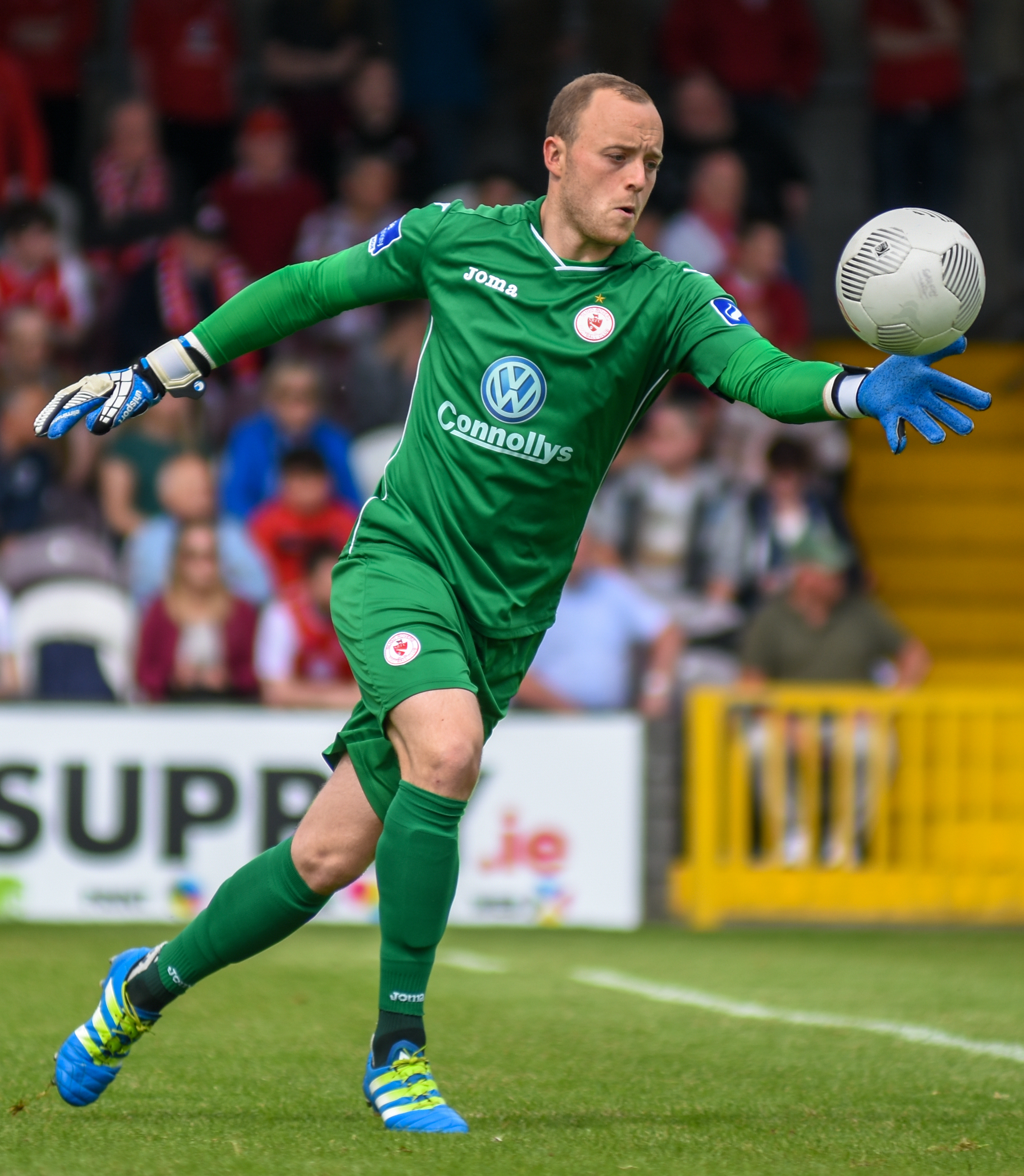
- Schlingermann playing for Sligo Rovers in 2016

Personal information
- Full name: Micheál Schlingermann
- Date of birth: 23 June 1991 (age 35)
- Place of birth: Castlebar, County Mayo, Ireland
- Position: Goalkeeper

Team information
- Current team: Mayo FC
- Number: 16

Youth career
- Kiltimagh/Knock United
- 2006–2009: Sligo Rovers

Senior career*
| Years | Team | Apps | (Gls) |
| 2009 | Sligo Rovers | 1 | (0) |
| 2010–2011 | Athlone Town | 42 | (0) |
| 2012 | Monaghan United | 5 | (0) |
| 2012–2015 | Drogheda United | 64 | (0) |
| 2016–2018 | Sligo Rovers | 54 | (0) |
| 2020 | Galway United | 5 | (0) |
| 2021–2022 | Athlone Town | 40 | (0) |
| 2023–2025 | Kiltimagh-Knock United | | |
| 2026– | Mayo FC | 0 | (0) |

Managerial career
- 2024–: Mayo FC (goalkeeping coach)
- 2026–: Mayo FC (assistant)
- * Club domestic league appearances and goals

Micheál Schlingermann (born 23 June 1991) is an Irish former professional footballer in the League of Ireland and a former Gaelic footballer for the Mayo county team. He is the current assistant and goalkeeping coach of FAI National League side Mayo FC.

== Gaelic football career ==
Born in Ireland to German parents, Micheál grew up in Kiltimagh, County Mayo and represented his county in the 2009 All-Ireland Minor Football Championship final against Armagh at Croke Park.

== Club career ==
=== Sligo Rovers ===
Micheál made his League of Ireland debut at Sligo Rovers in 2009. Having first appeared as an unused substitute in the latter stages of the season, he made one league appearance in the second last game of the season, starting between the posts in a 3–1 defeat against Bohemians at Dalymount Park on 30 October, before moving to Athlone Town in 2010.

=== Athlone Town ===
He made his league bow for Athlone on 17 July 2010 in a 2–1 defeat away to Longford Town and was ever present for Brendan Place's side for the remainder of the season, racking up 15 league appearances. Similarly in 2011 he missed just six league games under new boss Mike Kerley, adding 27 league appearances to his total.

=== Monaghan United ===
In December 2011 Micheál signed for Roddy Collins at Monaghan United. But just six months later, on 18 June, Monaghan withdrew from the league and Micheál signed for Mick Cooke at Drogheda United on 9 July.

=== Drogheda United ===
He went on to only play 1 league game in the 2012 season for Drogheda, a 1–0 loss to UCD but Micheál fared better in the 2013 season, making 14 league appearances for the club and keeping seven clean sheets in those games. Michael also played in two Cup finals that year as Drogheda fell at the last hurdle in both the EA and FAI Cups. Micheál stayed with Drogheda for the 2014 season and played sixteen times for the Drogs, keeping six clean sheets, as they finished ninth in the league table.

=== Return to Sligo Rovers ===
In January 2016 Schlingermann re-signed with Sligo Rovers for the final time. He left the club in June 2018 after a two-year spell.

=== Galway United ===
Schlingermann signed for First Division outfit Galway United ahead of the 2020 season. He played 6 games for the West Ireland side, before being released from the club at the end of the season as his contract was not renewed.

== Honours ==
=== Association football ===
- FAI League of Ireland Goalkeeper of the year - member of 2015 team of the year
- FAI Ford Cup runners-up medal (Sligo Rovers)
- 2009 FAI Umbro Colleges Cup winner 2010, 2012, 2013
- FAI/CUFL Premier Division 2011
- 2012 Captain of the Irish Colleges team
- 2012 EA Sports/League of Ireland Cup winner's medal (Drogheda United)
- 2012 Setanta Sports Cup runners-up medal (Drogheda United)
- 2013 EA Sports Cup/League Cup runners-up medal (Drogheda United)
- 2013 FAI Ford Cup runners-up medal (Drogheda United)

=== Gaelic football ===
- National Football League Division 1: 2019
