= 2018 Dundalk F.C. season =

Dundalk
2018 season
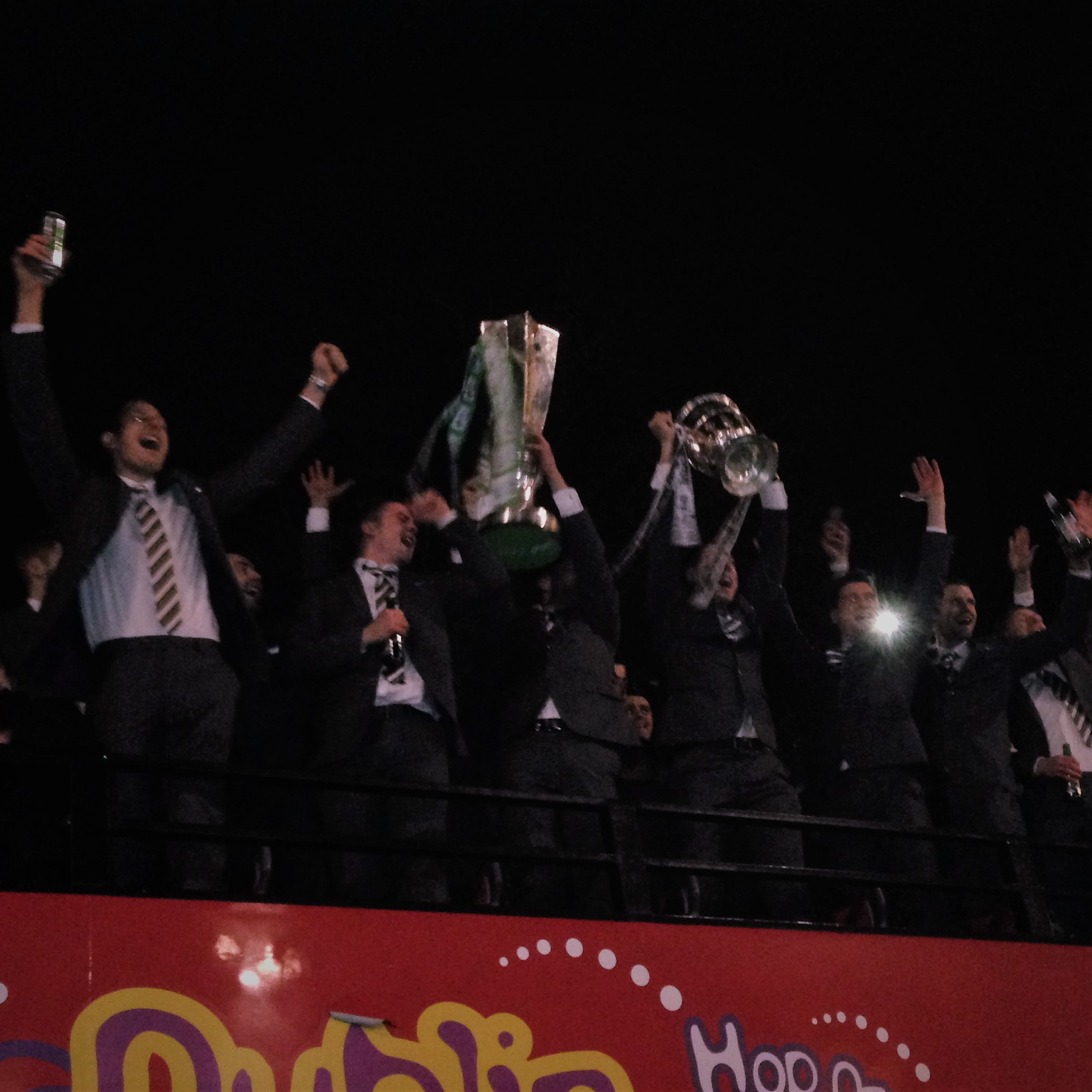
- Dundalk F.C. players celebrate League and Cup Double in 2018
- Manager: Stephen Kenny
- Premier Division: 1st (champions)
- FAI Cup: Winners
- League Cup: Semi-final
- President's Cup: Runners-up
- Leinster Senior Cup: Semi-final
- Europa League: 2Q
- Top goalscorer: League: Patrick Hoban (29) (Note: new club record.); All: Patrick Hoban (32)
- Highest home attendance: 4,117 (vs. Cork City, 29 June 2018)
Home colours	Away colours

Dundalk entered the 2018 season as the League Cup holders from 2017, having won that competition and finished as runners-up in both league and FAI Cup. In January the club was taken over by United States–based investors, who had identified the club's European progress as a commercial opportunity. 2018 would turn out to be Stephen Kenny's sixth and final season as manager. He resigned one month after the end of the season to accept the Republic of Ireland U-21 manager's role, and was replaced by his assistant, Vinny Perth for 2019. The 2018 season was Dundalk's 10th consecutive season in the top tier of Irish football, their 83rd in all, and their 92nd in the League of Ireland.

== Season summary ==
The new season's curtain raiser – the President's Cup – was played on 11 February in Oriel Park between Dundalk and Cork City – the winners of both league and cup the previous year. Cork City won on a 4-2 scoreline. The 36 round League programme commenced on 16 February 2018, and was completed on 26 October 2018. Dundalk regained their title with three games to spare, sealing the title in Oriel Park in a 1-1 draw with St Patrick's Athletic on 5 October 2018. They went on to win the 2018 FAI Cup with a 2-1 victory over Cork City in the final on 4 November 2018 – the club's fourth League and Cup Double. An opportunity to win the club's first domestic Treble was spurned when a largely reserve side lost the League Cup semi-final away to First Division Cobh Ramblers.

In Europe progress was limited when, after defeating Levadia Tallinn, and holding AEK Larnaca scoreless in Oriel Park, three quickfire first half goals in the away leg in Cyprus in the 2018-19 Europa League second qualifying round ended their interest in that year's competition.

=== First-Team Squad (2018) ===
Squad No.	Name	Date of Birth	Position	Debut season	League appearances	Goals
1	(Republic of Ireland) Gary Rogers	25 September 1981	GK	2015	34	0
2	(Republic of Ireland) Seán Gannon	11 July 1991	DF	2014	26	1
3	(Republic of Ireland) Brian Gartland	4 November 1986	DF	2013	22	1
4	(Republic of Ireland) Seán Hoare	15 March 1994	DF	2017	27	2
5	(Republic of Ireland) Chris Shields	27 December 1990	MF	2012	33	3
6	(Republic of Ireland) Stephen O'Donnell	15 January 1986	MF	2013	10	0
7	(Northern Ireland) Michael Duffy	28 July 1994	MF	2017	36	13
8	(Republic of Ireland) John Mountney	22 February 1993	MF	2012	18	4
9	(Republic of Ireland) Patrick Hoban	28 July 1991	FW	2013	36	29
10	(Republic of Ireland) Jamie McGrath	30 September 1996	MF	2017	30	2
11	(Hungary) Krisztián Adorján (Note: Loan signing, loan completed in July.)	19 January 1993	MF	2018	16	3
11	(Republic of Ireland) Patrick McEleney (Note: Signed from Oldham Athletic in July and took the departed Adorján's squad number.)	26 September 1992	MF	2016	11	1
12	(Republic of Ireland) Sam Byrne (Note: Sent on loan to Glentoran in July.)	23 July 1995	FW	2018	2	0
13	(Lithuania) Karolis Chvedukas	21 April 1991	MF	2018	7	1
14	(Republic of Ireland) Dane Massey	17 April 1988	DF	2013	29	1
15	(Republic of Ireland) Stephen Folan	14 January 1992	DF	2018	9	1
16	(Republic of Ireland) Dylan Connolly	2 May 1995	MF	2017	28	4
17	(Republic of Ireland) Georgie Poynton	8 September 1997	MF	2015	4	0
18	(Republic of Ireland) Robbie Benson	7 May 1992	MF	2016	32	9
19	(Republic of Ireland) Ronan Murray	12 September 1991	FW	2018	23	3
21	(Republic of Ireland) Daniel Cleary	9 March 1996	DF	2018	26	3
22	(Romania) Gabriel Sava	15 September 1986	GK	2014	3	0
23	(Nigeria) Marco Tagbajumi (Note: Released in July.)	1 July 1988	FW	2018	16	2
30	(Republic of Ireland) Ross Treacy	26 September 1998	GK	2018	0	0
33	(Northern Ireland) Dean Jarvis	1 June 1992	DF	2018	19	0
45	(Republic of Ireland) Georgie Kelly (Note: Signed from UCD in July.)	12 November 1996	FW	2018	7	0

== Competitions ==
=== President's Cup ===
11 February 2018	Cork City	4 - 2	Dundalk	Oriel Park
		Report		Attendance: 3,000; Referee: Derek Tomney

=== Premier Division ===
Pos	Team	Pld	W	D	L	GF	GA	GD	Pts	Qualification or relegation
1	Dundalk (C)	36	27	6	3	85	20	+65	87	Qualification for Champions League first qualifying round
2	Cork City	36	24	5	7	71	27	+44	77	Qualification for Europa League first qualifying round (Note: Since the winners of the 2018 FAI Cup, Dundalk, qualified for European competition based on their league position, the spot awarded to the Cup winner (Europa League first qualifying round) would normally pass to the next best-placed team (the fourth-placed team). However, as Waterford were adjudged by UEFA to have not passed the "three-year rule" as they were reformed in 2016, the spot was passed to the fifth-placed team.)
3	Shamrock Rovers	36	18	8	10	57	27	+30	62	Qualification for Europa League first qualifying round
4	Waterford	36	18	5	13	52	44	+8	59	
5	St Patrick's Athletic	36	15	5	16	51	47	+4	50	Qualification for Europa League first qualifying round

Source: SSE Airtricity League, Soccerway
Rules for classification: 1) Points; 2) Goal difference; 3) Goals scored.
(C) Champions

=== FAI Cup ===
First round

10 August 2018	Dundalk	3–0	Cobh Ramblers	Dundalk
19:45	Murray 32', 85'; McGrath 52'	Report		Stadium: Oriel Park; Referee: Robert Rogers

Second round

24 August 2018	Dundalk	2–0	Finn Harps	Dundalk
19:45	Murray 24' (pen.); Kelly 52'	Report		Stadium: Oriel Park; Attendance: 1,823; Referee: Paul McLaughlin

Quarter Final

7 September 2018	Limerick	0–4	Dundalk	Limerick
19:45	O'Sullivan (yellow card) 20'; Maguire (yellow card) 59'; Coleman (yellow card) 70'	Report	Hoban 5', 21'; Mountney 36'; Kelly 71'	Stadium: Markets Field; Referee: Derek Tomney

Semi-final

28 September 2018	Dundalk	1–0	UCD	Dundalk
19:45	McEleney 41'	Report		Stadium: Oriel Park; Attendance: 2,926; Referee: Robert Hennessy

Final

4 November 2018	Cork City	1–2	Dundalk	Aviva Stadium
16:40	Sadlier 21' (pen.)	Report	Hoare 19'; McEleney 73'	Attendance: 30,412; Referee: Neil Doyle

=== League Cup ===
Second round

2 April 2018	St Patrick's Athletic	4–4 (a.e.t.) (7–8 p)	Dundalk*	Richmond Park
17:00	Fagan 58'; Kelly 60'; Leahy 97'; Leahy 104'		Tagbajumi 3'; Murray 45'; Leahy 102' (og.); Massey 120'	Referee: Adriano Reale
	Penalties
	Fagan (penalty scored); Clarke (penalty missed); Doona (penalty scored); Kelly (penalty scored); Lennon (penalty scored); Toner (penalty scored); Leahy (penalty scored); Madden (penalty scored); Markey (penalty missed)		Massey (penalty missed); McGrath (penalty scored); Poynton (penalty scored); Adorján (penalty scored); Gartland (penalty scored); Mountney (penalty scored); O'Donnell (penalty scored); Folan (penalty scored); Tagbajumi (penalty scored)

Quarter Final

8 May 2018	Dundalk	3–0	Bohemians	Oriel Park
19:45	Dylan Connolly 8', 21'; Jamie McGrath 88'	Report		Attendance: 1,000 (estimate); Referee: Robert Rogers

Semi-final

6 August 2018	Cobh Ramblers	1–0	Dundalk	St. Colman's Park
17:00	Christopher Hull 75'	Report		Referee: Sean Grant

=== Leinster Senior Cup ===
Fourth round

5 June 2018	Dundalk	3–1	Bohemians	Dundalk, County Louth
19:45 GMT	Ronan Murray 69'; Sam Byrne 81'; Krisztián Adorján 84'	Report	Jonathan Lunney 26'	Stadium: Oriel Park; Attendance: 500 (est.); Referee: Tom Dempsey

Quarter Final

2 July 2018	Shamrock Rovers	0–1	Dundalk	Tallaght, County Dublin
19:45 GMT		Report	Ronan Murray 25'	Stadium: Tallaght Stadium; Attendance: 500 (est.); Referee: Derek Tomney

Semi-final

3 September 2018	St Patrick's Athletic	1–0 (a.e.t.)	Dundalk	Inchicore, Dublin
19:45 GMT	Kevin Toner 105'	Report		Stadium: Richmond Park; Attendance: 750 (est.); Referee: Alan Patchell

=== Europe ===
==== Europa League ====
First qualifying round

12 July 2018
18:00 (19:00 EEST)

FCI Levadia (Estonia)	0–1	(Republic of Ireland) Dundalk
	Report	Connolly 53'

Kadriorg Stadium, Tallinn
Attendance: 1,343<
Referee: Bojan Nikolić (Serbia)
19 July 2018
20:45 (19:45 IST)

Dundalk (Republic of Ireland)	2–1	(Estonia) FCI Levadia
Hoban 31'; Duffy 33'	Report	Debelko 42'

Oriel Park, Dundalk
Attendance: 3,100
Referee: Adrien Jaccottet (Switzerland)

Dundalk won 3–1 on aggregate.

Second qualifying round

26 July 2018
20:45 (19:45 IST)

Dundalk (Republic of Ireland)	0–0	(Cyprus) AEK Larnaca
	Report

Oriel Park, Dundalk
Attendance: 3,100
Referee: Harald Lechner (Austria)
2 August 2018
17:30 (18:30 EEST)

AEK Larnaca (Cyprus)	4–0	(Republic of Ireland) Dundalk
Tričkovski 13', 38'; Tete 21'; Tomàs 87'	Report

AEK Arena – Georgios Karapatakis, Larnaca
Attendance: 3,991
Referee: Fran Jović (Croatia)

AEK Larnaca won 4–0 on aggregate.

== Awards ==
=== Player of the Month ===
Month	Player	References
April	(Northern Ireland) Michael Duffy	
May	(Republic of Ireland) Seán Hoare	
June	(Republic of Ireland) Patrick Hoban	
August	(Northern Ireland) Michael Duffy	
September	(Republic of Ireland) Chris Shields	
October/November	(Republic of Ireland) Patrick McEleney	

=== PFAI Player of the Year ===
Player	Reference
(Northern Ireland) Michael Duffy	

=== PFAI Young Player of the Year ===
Player	Reference
(Republic of Ireland) Jamie McGrath	

=== FAI League of Ireland Player of the Year ===
Player	Reference
(Republic of Ireland) Chris Shields	

=== SWAI Personality of the Year ===
Person	Reference
(Republic of Ireland) Stephen Kenny	
