= 2018 League of Ireland Cup =

EA Sports Cup

Tournament details
- Country: Ireland
- Dates: 12 March – 16 September
- Teams: 24

Final positions
- Champions: Derry City
- Runners-up: Cobh Ramblers

Tournament statistics
- Matches played: 23
- Top goal scorer(s): Ronan Curtis (Derry City); Aaron McEneff (Derry City); James English (Shelbourne); Jamie Doyle (Shelbourne) (3 each)

The 2018 League of Ireland Cup, known for sponsorship reasons as the 2018 EA Sports Cup, was the 45th season of the League of Ireland's secondary knockout competition. The EA Sports Cup features teams from the SSE Airtricity League Premier and First Divisions, as well as some intermediate level teams. Derry City won the cup for a record 11th time.

== Teams ==
Pool 1	Pool 2	Pool 3	Pool 4
Cobh Ramblers; Cork City *; Limerick *; Waterford; Wexford; UCC	Cockhill Celtic; Derry City *; Finn Harps; Galway United; Mayo League; Sligo Rovers *	Bray Wanderers; Drogheda United; Dundalk *; Shelbourne; St Patrick's Athletic *; St Mochta's	Athlone; Bohemians; Cabinteely; Longford Town *; Shamrock Rovers *; UCD

Clubs denoted with * received a bye into Second round

== First round ==
All teams were divided into four pools based on geographical location. Two random teams per pool received a bye into the second round. The draw for the first round took place on 9 February 2018. Ties were scheduled to begin on 5 March 2018 but were subsequently postponed due to the aftermath of extreme weather from a cold wave known as the Beast from the East combined with Storm Emma. Rescheduled ties were set for various dates across March and April 2018.

12 March 2018	Finn Harps	4–3	Mayo League	Finn Park
19:45	7' Devers 41' O'Connor 51' Toland 56' O'Flynn		59' 82' Lavelle 71 ' Morrissey

13 March 2018	Wexford	0–0 (a.e.t.) (7–8 p)	Cobh Ramblers*	Ferrycarraig Park
20:00

19 March 2018	Galway United	1–0	Cockhill Celtic	Eamonn Deacy Park
19:45	51' Gill (OG)

26 March 2018	Waterford	4–1	UCC	Regional Sports Centre
19:45	11' Martin 32' Puri 40' Daly 66' Akinade		55' Hennessy

26 March 2018	Bray Wanderers	0–3	Shelbourne	Carlisle Grounds
19:45			24' 61' English 29' Boyne	Attendance: 208; Referee: Alan Carey

26 March 2018	Bohemians	5–1	Cabinteely	Dalymount Park
19:45	37' 76' Watts 38' 42' Manley 65' Grant		8' Fitzpatrick

27 March 2018	Athlone Town	0–2	UCD	Athlone Town Stadium
19:45			34' Molloy 84' Mahdy

9 April 2018	Drogheda United	3–2	St Mochta's	United Park
19:45	28' Doyle 31' McPhillips 40' Meaney		20' Kelly (Pen) 89' Hughes

== Second round ==
The draw for the Second round took place on 22 March 2018 and was made on a regional pool basis. Ties were scheduled for Easter Monday 2 April 2018. Four second round fixtures were postponed due to heavy rainfall causing unplayable pitches. Rearranged fixtures were set for 9 April, 23 April and 24 April.

2 April 2018	Bohemians	2–2 (a.e.t.) (5–3 p)	U.C.D.	Dalymount Park
15:00	Eoghan Stokes 54'; Jonathan Lunney 85' (pen.)	Report	Yousef Mahdy 21'; Gary O’Neill 35'	Attendance: 314; Referee: Derek Tomney
	Penalties
	Dan Casey (penalty scored); Jamie Hamilton (penalty scored); Ryan Graydon (penalty scored); Jonathan Lunney (penalty scored); Eoghan Stokes (penalty scored)		(penalty scored) Gary O’Neill; (penalty scored) Timmy Molloy; (penalty scored) Ben Hanrahan; (penalty missed) Paul Doyle

2 April 2018	Finn Harps	1–2	Derry City	Finn Park
17:00	Ciaran Coll 11'	Report	Aaron McEneff 29' (pen.); Rory Patterson 63'	Attendance: 935; Referee: John McLoughlin

2 April 2018	Galway United	0–1	Sligo Rovers	Eamonn Deacy Park
17:00		report report2	Adam Morgan 83'	Referee: Raymond Matthews

2 April 2018	St Patrick's Athletic	4–4 (a.e.t.) (7–8 p)	Dundalk*	Richmond Park
17:00	Fagan 58'; Kelly 60'; Leahy 97'; Leahy 104'		Tagbajumi 3'; Murray 45'; Leahy 102' (og.); Massey 120'	Referee: Adriano Reale
	Penalties
	Fagan (penalty scored); Clarke (penalty missed); Doona (penalty scored); Kelly (penalty scored); Lennon (penalty scored); Toner (penalty scored); Leahy (penalty scored); Madden (penalty scored); Markey (penalty missed)		Massey (penalty missed); McGrath (penalty scored); Poynton (penalty scored); Adorján (penalty scored); Gartland (penalty scored); Mountney (penalty scored); O'Donnell (penalty scored); Folan (penalty scored); Tagbajumi (penalty scored)

9 April 2018	Limerick	0–1	Cobh Ramblers	Markets Field
20:45			90' O'Riordan	Referee: Anthony Buttimer

23 April 2018	Waterford*	1–1 (a.e.t.) (5–3 p)	Cork City	Regional Sports Centre
19:45	100' Duffus		112' O'Hanlon

24 April 2018	Shelbourne	7–2	Drogheda United	Tolka Park
	20' Mulcahy 22' Rooney 25' Kavanagh; 27' 48' 90' Doyle 60' Farrell		69' Trimble; 70' Hondermarck

24 April 2018	Shamrock Rovers	0–1	Longford Town	Tallaght Stadium
19:45		Report	Daniel O’Reilly 89'	Attendance: 304; Referee: Thomas Dempsey

== Quarter-finals ==
The draw for the quarter-finals took place on 10 April 2018 and was an open draw, unlike previous rounds which were drawn on a geographic pooled basis. Ties are due to be played on 7/8 May 2018.

7 May 2018	Derry City	7–3	Shelbourne	Brandywell Stadium
17:00	Ronan Curtis 5', 15', 40'; Ronan Hale 36'; Aaron McEneff 43' (pen.); Nicky Low 83'; Nathan Boyle 90'	Report	David O’Sullivan 21', 28'; James English 81'	Attendance: 1000 (estimate); Referee: Damien MacGrait

8 May 2018	Cobh Ramblers	2–0	Longford Town	St. Colman's Park
19:30	Darren Murphy 43'; Andrew Wall 88'	Report		Referee: Anthony Buttimer

8 May 2018	Dundalk	3–0	Bohemians	Oriel Park
19:45	Dylan Connolly 8', 21'; Jamie McGrath 88'	Report		Attendance: 1,000 (estimate); Referee: Robert Rogers

8 May 2018	Sligo Rovers	1–0	Waterford	The Showgrounds
19:45	David Cawley 63'	Report		Referee: Paul McLaughlin

== Semi-finals ==
The draw for the semi-finals of the 2018 EA Sports Cup was made on 13 May 2018. Both ties were played on 6 August 2018.

6 August 2018	Sligo Rovers	0–1	Derry City	The Showgrounds
17:00		Report	Rory Hale 24'	Referee: Graham Kelly

6 August 2018	Cobh Ramblers	1–0	Dundalk	St. Colman's Park
17:00	Christopher Hull 75'	Report		Referee: Sean Grant

== Final ==
The final of the League of Ireland Cup took place on 16 September 2018. Home advantage was decided by a coin toss, which Derry City won.

16 September 2018	Derry City	3–1	Cobh Ramblers	Brandywell Stadium
16:00	Ronan Hale 23'; Darren Cole 54'; Aaron McEneff 72' (pen.)	Report	Christopher Hull 26'	Attendance: 3,500; Referee: Ben Connolly
