= 2018 St Patrick's Athletic F.C. season =

St Patrick's Athletic F.C.
2018 season
- Chairman: Garrett Kelleher
- Coach: Liam Buckley; Ger O'Brien (caretaker manager from 25 September)
- Stadium: Richmond Park, Inchicore, Dublin 8
- League of Ireland: 5th
- FAI Cup: Second Round (eliminated by Derry City)
- EA Sports Cup: Second Round (eliminated by Dundalk)
- Leinster Senior Cup: Runners-up (to Shelbourne)
- Top goalscorer: League: Jake Keegan (9 goals); All: Jake Keegan (12 goals)
- Highest home attendance: 5,000 vs Newcastle United (17 July)
- Lowest home attendance: 200 (est.) vs Wexford (9 July)
Home colours	Away colours	Third colours

The 2018 Season was St Patrick's Athletic F.C.'s 89th year in existence and was the Supersaints' 67th consecutive season in the top flight of Irish football. It was the seventh year that Liam Buckley is the team's manager (in his current spell), following replacing Pete Mahon in December 2011. Buckley resigned from his post as manager on 25 September with assistant Ger O'Brien taking over for the remainder of the season. It was the first year of the new format of the League of Ireland Premier Division where by there will be 10 teams playing each other four times, twice home and twice away. On 19 December 2017 the fixtures were announced with Pat's down to play champions Cork City on the opening day of the season on 16 February 2018.

== Squad ==
No.	Name	Position(s)	Nationality	Hometown	Date of birth (age)	Previous club	Year signed	Club apps.	Club goals
Goalkeepers
1	Barry Murphy	GK	(Republic of Ireland)	Tallaght, Dublin	8 June 1985 (age 41)	(Republic of Ireland) Shamrock Rovers	2017	54	0
16	Brian Maher	GK	(Republic of Ireland)	Raheny, Dublin	1 November 2000 (age 25)	(Republic of Ireland) St Patrick's Athletic Under 17's	2018	2	0
24	Tyson Farago	GK	(Canada)	(Canada) Winnipeg, Manitoba	1 May 1991 (age 35)	(Canada) FC Edmonton	2018	4	0
25	Pat Jennings	GK	(England)	(England) Watford, Hertfordshire	24 September 1979 (age 47)	(Republic of Ireland) Athlone Town	2013	5	0
26	Brendan Clarke	GK	(Republic of Ireland)	Inchicore, Dublin	17 September 1985 (age 41)	(Republic of Ireland) Limerick	2018	223	1
Defenders
2	Michael Barker	RB/LB	(Republic of Ireland)	Dublin	16 August 1993 (age 33)	(Republic of Ireland) Bray Wanderers	2016	64	2
3	Ian Bermingham (Captain)	LB	(Republic of Ireland)	Ballyfermot, Dublin	6 June 1989 (age 37)	(Republic of Ireland) Shamrock Rovers	2010	355	15
4	Kevin Toner	CB	(Republic of Ireland)	Ashbourne, Meath	18 July 1996 (age 30)	(England) Aston Villa	2018	37	6
5	Lee Desmond	CB/CDM/LB	(Republic of Ireland)	Donaghmede, Dublin	22 January 1995 (age 31)	(Republic of Ireland) Shelbourne	2015	139	0
17	Simon Madden	RB	(Republic of Ireland)	Tallaght, Dublin	1 May 1988 (age 38)	(Republic of Ireland) Shamrock Rovers	2018	41	2
23	Michael Leahy	CB	(Republic of Ireland)	Stillorgan, Dublin	30 April 1989 (age 37)	(Republic of Ireland) Sligo Rovers	2018	14	5
29	Joe Manley	CB	(Republic of Ireland)	Dublin	26 June 1999 (age 27)	(Republic of Ireland) St Patrick's Athletic Under 19's	2018	4	0
31	Paul Cleary	LB	(Republic of Ireland)	Lucan, Dublin	9 February 1999 (age 27)	(Republic of Ireland) St Patrick's Athletic Under 19's	2018	1	0
Midfielders
6	Owen Garvan	CM/CDM	(Republic of Ireland)	Dublin	29 January 1988 (age 38)	(England) Colchester United	2017	21	0
6	Conor Clifford	CM	(Republic of Ireland)	Ballyfermot, Dublin	29 January 1988 (age 38)	(Republic of Ireland) Limerick	2018	12	2
7	Conan Byrne	RW	(Republic of Ireland)	Swords, Dublin	10 August 1985 (age 41)	(Republic of Ireland) Shelbourne	2013	251	77
8	Graham Kelly	CM/CDM/CAM	(Republic of Ireland)	Whitechurch, Dublin	31 October 1991 (age 34)	(Republic of Ireland) Bray Wanderers	2016	93	12
10	Killian Brennan	CAM/CM/CDM	(Republic of Ireland)	Drogheda, Louth	31 January 1984 (age 42)	(Republic of Ireland) Drogheda United	2017	138	22
11	Ryan Brennan	CM/RW	(Republic of Ireland)	Drogheda, Louth	11 November 1991 (age 34)	(Republic of Ireland) Bray Wanderers	2018	38	5
12	James Doona	CAM/LW/RW	(Republic of Ireland)	Inchicore, Dublin	15 January 1998 (age 28)	(Republic of Ireland) Shamrock Rovers	2018	21	2
14	Ian Turner	RW/LW/RB/ST	(Republic of Ireland)	Wilton, Cork	19 April 1989 (age 37)	(Republic of Ireland) Limerick	2017	25	2
15	Darragh Markey	CAM	(Republic of Ireland)	Lucan, Dublin	23 May 1997 (age 29)	(Republic of Ireland) St Patrick's Athletic Under 19's	2015	75	2
18	Dean Clarke	LW/ST	(Republic of Ireland)	Sandyford, Dublin	29 March 1993 (age 33)	(Republic of Ireland) Limerick	2018	36	5
19	Thomas Byrne	RW/LW/ST	(Republic of Ireland)	Dunleer, Louth	26 January 1999 (age 27)	(Republic of Ireland) Drogheda United	2018	16	4
20	Jamie Lennon	CAM	(Republic of Ireland)	Santry, Dublin	9 May 1998 (age 28)	(Republic of Ireland) St Patrick's Athletic Under 19's	2017	37	1
28	Luke Heeney	RW/CM	(Republic of Ireland)	Duleek, Louth	6 February 1999 (age 27)	(Republic of Ireland) St Patrick's Athletic Under 19's	2018	1	0
Forwards
9	Christy Fagan	ST	(Republic of Ireland)	Smithfield, Dublin	11 May 1989 (age 37)	(Republic of Ireland) Bohemians	2012	229	93
21	Jake Keegan	ST	(United States)	(United States) Stormville, New York	21 April 1991 (age 35)	(Canada) FC Edmonton	2018	36	12
99	Achille Campion	ST	(France)	(France) Levallois-Perret, Paris	10 March 1990 (age 36)	(Republic of Ireland) Cork City	2018	8	3
33	Neill Byrne	STRW/LW	(Republic of Ireland)	Dunshaughlin, Meath	2 March 1999 (age 27)	(Republic of Ireland) St Patrick's Athletic Under 19's	2018	1	0

=== Transfers ===
==== In ====
Player	Country	Position	Signed from
Ryan Brennan	(Republic of Ireland)	Midfielder	(Republic of Ireland) Bray Wanderers
Dean Clarke	(Republic of Ireland)	Midfielder	(Republic of Ireland) Limerick
Thomas Byrne	(Republic of Ireland)	Midfielder	(Republic of Ireland) Drogheda United
Simon Madden	(Republic of Ireland)	Defender	(Republic of Ireland) Shamrock Rovers
James Doona	(Republic of Ireland)	Midfielder	(Republic of Ireland) Shamrock Rovers
Kevin Toner	(Republic of Ireland)	Defender	(England) Aston Villa
Michael Leahy	(Republic of Ireland)	Defender	(Republic of Ireland) Sligo Rovers
Jake Keegan	(United States)	Forward	(Canada) FC Edmonton
Tyson Farago	(Canada)	Goalkeeper	(Canada) FC Edmonton

==== Out ====
Player	Country	Position	Sold to
Josh O'Hanlon	(Republic of Ireland)	Forward	(Republic of Ireland) Cork City
Gavin Peers	(Republic of Ireland)	Defender	(Republic of Ireland) Derry City
Kurtis Byrne	(Republic of Ireland)	Forward	(Northern Ireland) Linfield
Jonathan Lunney	(Republic of Ireland)	Midfielder	(Republic of Ireland) Bohemians
Jordi Balk	(Netherlands)	Defender	(Netherlands) FC Lienden
Rory Feely	(Republic of Ireland)	Defender	(Republic of Ireland) Waterford
Paul O’Conor	(Republic of Ireland)	Midfielder	(Republic of Ireland) Bray Wanderers
Ciaran Kelly	(Republic of Ireland)	Defender	(Republic of Ireland) Drogheda United
Steven Grogan	(Republic of Ireland)	Midfielder	Released
Łukasz Skowron	(Poland)	Goalkeeper	Released
Ger O'Brien	(Republic of Ireland)	Defender	Retired
Billy Dennehy	(Republic of Ireland)	Midfielder	(Republic of Ireland) Limerick
Darren Dennehy	(Republic of Ireland)	Defender	(Republic of Ireland) Limerick
Alex O'Hanlon	(Republic of Ireland)	Midfielder	(Northern Ireland) Glentoran

==== In ====
Player	Country	Position	Signed from
Brendan Clarke	(Republic of Ireland)	Goalkeeper	(Republic of Ireland) Limerick
Conor Clifford	(Republic of Ireland)	Midfielder	(Republic of Ireland) Limerick
Achille Campion	(France)	Forward	(Republic of Ireland) Cork City

==== Out ====
Player	Country	Position	Sold to
Owen Garvan	(Republic of Ireland)	Midfielder	Released
Tyson Farago	(Canada)	Goalkeeper	(Canada) WSA Winnipeg
Graham Kelly	(Republic of Ireland)	Midfielder	Released

=== Squad statistics ===
==== Appearances, goals and cards ====
Number in brackets represents (appearances of which were substituted ON). Last updated – 28 October 2018

No.	Player	Airtricity League		FAI Cup		EA Sports Cup		Leinster Senior Cup		Total	
No.	Player	Apps	Goals	Apps	Goals	Apps	Goals	Apps	Goals	Apps	Goals
1	Barry Murphy	22	0	0	0	0	0	1	0	23	0
2	Michael Barker	6(2)	0	0	0	1	0	1	0	8(2)	0
3	Ian Bermingham	34(1)	2	2	0	0	0	3	0	39(1)	2
4	Kevin Toner	30	4	2	0	1(1)	0	4	2	37(1)	6
5	Lee Desmond	36	0	2	0	1	0	3	0	42	0
6	Owen Garvan	10(1)	0	0	0	0	0	1	0	11(1)	0
6	Conor Clifford	9(2)	2	2(1)	0	0	0	1	0	12(3)	2
7	Conan Byrne	33(5)	7	2(1)	1	0	0	2(1)	0	37(7)	8
8	Graham Kelly	14(8)	1	0	0	1	1	3	1	18(8)	3
9	Christy Fagan	15(9)	1	0	0	1	1	1	1	17(9)	3
10	Killian Brennan	15(8)	1	2(1)	0	0	0	0	0	17(9)	1
11	Ryan Brennan	34(2)	4	2	0	0	0	3(1)	1	39(3)	5
12	James Doona	17(10)	2	0	0	1	0	3(1)	0	21(11)	2
14	Ian Turner	11(9)	1	2(1)	0	1	0	2	1	16(10)	2
15	Darragh Markey	30(10)	1	1	1	1	0	4(2)	0	36(12)	2
16	Brian Maher	0	0	0	0	0	0	2	0	2	0
17	Simon Madden	36	1	2	1	1(1)	0	2	0	41(1)	2
18	Dean Clarke	30(2)	5	2	0	1(1)	0	3(1)	0	36(4)	5
19	Thomas Byrne	14(8)	3	0	0	1	0	1	1	16(7)	4
20	Jamie Lennon	29(2)	0	2	0	1	0	4(1)	0	36(3)	0
21	Jake Keegan	32(9)	9	1(1)	2	0	0	3(1)	1	36(11)	12
23	Michael Leahy	10(1)	2	1(1)	0	1	2	2	1	14(2)	5
24	Tyson Farago	3(1)	0	0	0	1	0	0	0	4(1)	0
25	Pat Jennings	0	0	0	0	0	0	0	0	0	0
26	Brendan Clarke	12	1	2	0	0	0	1	0	15	1
28	Luke Heeney	1(1)	0	0	0	0	0	0	0	1(1)	0
29	Joe Manley	2(1)	0	0	0	0	0	2(1)	0	4(2)	0
31	Paul Cleary	0	0	0	0	0	0	1(1)	0	1(1)	0
33	Neill Byrne	1(1)	0	0	0	0	0	0	0	1(1)	0
99	Achille Campion	5(1)	2	1	0	0	0	2(1)	1	8(2)	3

==== Top scorers ====
Includes all competitive matches. Last updated 28 October 2018

Number	Name	SSE Airtricity League	FAI Cup	EA Sports Cup	Leinster Senior Cup	Total
21	Jake Keegan	9	2	0	1	12
7	Conan Byrne	7	1	0	0	8
4	Kevin Toner	4	0	0	2	6
23	Michael Leahy	2	0	2	1	5
18	Dean Clarke	5	0	0	0	5
11	Ryan Brennan	4	0	0	1	5
19	Thomas Byrne	3	0	0	1	4
99	Achille Campion	2	0	0	1	3
3	Ian Bermingham	2	0	0	1	3
9	Christy Fagan	1	0	1	1	3
12	James Doona	2	0	0	0	2
6	Conor Clifford	2	0	0	0	2
17	Simon Madden	1	1	0	0	2
15	Darragh Markey	1	1	0	0	2
8	Graham Kelly	1	0	1	0	2
14	Ian Turner	1	0	0	1	2
26	Brendan Clarke	1	0	0	0	1
10	Killian Brennan	1	0	0	0	1

==== Top assists ====
Includes all competitive matches. Last updated 28 October 2018

Number	Name	SSE Airtricity League	FAI Cup	EA Sports Cup	Leinster Senior Cup	Total
7	Conan Byrne	12	1	0	2	15
3	Ian Bermingham	6	1	0	0	7
15	Darragh Markey	2	1	1	1	5
17	Simon Madden	3	0	0	1	4
14	Ian Turner	0	1	1	2	4
6	Owen Garvan	3	0	0	1	4
21	Jake Keegan	3	0	0	0	3
11	Ryan Brennan	2	0	0	1	3
12	James Doona	1	0	2	0	3
4	Kevin Toner	3	0	0	0	3
18	Dean Clarke	3	0	0	0	3
20	Jamie Lennon	2	0	0	0	2
9	Christy Fagan	2	0	0	0	2
8	Graham Kelly	1	0	0	1	2
6	Conor Clifford	1	0	0	0	1
23	Michael Leahy	1	0	0	0	1
5	Lee Desmond	1	0	0	0	1
99	Achille Campion	1	0	0	0	1
19	Thomas Byrne	1	0	0	0	1

==== Top clean sheets ====
Includes all competitive matches. Last updated 28 October 2018

Position	Number	Name	SSE Airtricity League	FAI Cup	EA Sports Cup	Leinster Senior Cup	Total
GK	1	Barry Murphy	9/22	0/0	0/0	1/1	10/23
GK	16	Brian Maher	0/0	0/0	0/0	1/2	1/2
GK	24	Tyson Farago	1/3	0/0	0/1	0/0	1/4
GK	25	Pat Jennings	0/0	0/0	0/0	0/0	0/0
GK	26	Brendan Clarke	4/12	1/2	0/0	0/1	5/15

==== Disciplinary record ====
Number	Name	SSE Airtricity League		FAI Cup		EA Sports Cup		Leinster Senior Cup		Total	
Number	Name	Booked	Sent off (straight red)	Booked	Sent off (straight red)	Booked	Sent off (straight red)	Booked	Sent off (straight red)	Booked	Sent off (straight red)
20	Jamie Lennon	10	0	0	0	0	0	1	0	11	0
19	Thomas Byrne	7	2	0	0	0	0	1	0	8	2
4	Kevin Toner	6	1	0	0	0	0	3	0	9	1
11	Ryan Brennan	6	1	0	0	0	0	0	0	6	1
18	Dean Clarke	3	0	0	0	0	0	2	1	5	1
3	Ian Bermingham	5	1	0	0	0	0	0	0	5	1
99	Achille Campion	3	0	0	0	0	0	1	0	4	0
15	Darragh Markey	4	0	0	0	0	0	0	0	4	0
11	Killian Brennan	4	0	0	0	0	0	0	0	4	0
17	Simon Madden	3	0	0	0	0	0	0	0	3	0
6	Owen Garvan	3	0	0	0	0	0	0	0	3	0
29	Joe Manley	1	0	0	0	0	0	1	0	2	0
5	Lee Desmond	2	0	0	0	0	0	0	0	2	0
8	Graham Kelly	2	0	0	0	0	0	0	0	2	0
7	Conan Byrne	2	0	0	0	0	0	0	0	2	0
26	Brendan Clarke	1	0	0	0	0	0	0	0	1	0
23	Michael Leahy	1	0	0	0	0	0	0	0	1	0
21	Jake Keegan	1	0	0	0	0	0	0	0	1	0
2	Michael Barker	0	0	0	0	1	0	0	0	1	0
1	Barry Murphy	1	0	0	0	0	0	0	0	1	0
Totals		64	5	1	0	1	0	9	1	75	6

==== Captains ====
No.	P	Name	Country	No. games	Notes
3	DF	Ian Bermingham	(Republic of Ireland)	37	Captain
26	GK	Brendan Clarke	(Republic of Ireland)	2	
5	DF	Lee Desmond	(Republic of Ireland)	2	
7	DF	Conan Byrne	(Republic of Ireland)	1	

Last updated: 28 October 2018
Source: Competitive match reports.
Competitive matches only
Matches started as captain only
Country: FIFA nationality; No.: Squad number; P: Position; Name: Player name; No. Games: Number of games started as captain.

== Club ==
=== Coaching staff ===
- Manager: Liam Buckley
- Head Of Player Recruitment/Coach: Dave Campbell
- Assistant coach/Director of Football: Ger O'Brien
- Coach: Martin Doyle
- Goalkeeping coach: Pat Jennings
- Chartered Physiotherapist/Strength and Conditioning Coach: Mark Kenneally
- Coaches Assistant: Graeme Buckley
- Physiotherapist: Christy O'Neill
- Club Doctor: Dr Matt Corcoran
- Kit Man: Derek Haines
- Equipment Manager: David McGill
- Under 19's Manager: Darius Kierans
- Under 19's Assistant Manager: Simon Madden
- Under 17's Manager: Jamie Moore
- Under 17's Assistant Manager: Darragh O'Reilly
- Under 17's Assistant Manager: Sean Gahan
- Under 15's Manager: Denis Hyland
- Under 15's Assistant Manager: Sean O'Connor
- Under 15's Coach: Paul Webb
- Under 19's/17's/15's Coach: Keith Andrews
- Under 19's/17's Goalkeeping Coach: Stephen O'Reilly

=== Kit ===
Supplier: Umbro
Sponsor(s): MIG Insurance Brokers (Front of Jersey)
Bill Griffin Motors (Back of Jersey)
Flomax.ie (Back of Jersey)
Greenisle Hotel (Sleeves)

Home	Away	Third

The club released a new home kit for the season, with the away kit being retained from the 2017 season. During the season, a new limited edition third kit was released for the friendly game with Newcastle United.

== Competitions ==
=== League of Ireland ===
==== League table ====
Pos	Team	Pld	W	D	L	GF	GA	GD	Pts	Qualification or relegation
3	Shamrock Rovers	36	18	8	10	57	27	+30	62	Qualification for Europa League first qualifying round (Note: Since the winners of the 2018 FAI Cup, Dundalk, qualified for European competition based on their league position, the spot awarded to the Cup winner (Europa League first qualifying round) would normally pass to the next best-placed team (the fourth-placed team). However, as Waterford were adjudged by UEFA to have not passed the "three-year rule" as they were reformed in 2016, the spot was passed to the fifth-placed team.)
4	Waterford	36	18	5	13	52	44	+8	59	
5	St Patrick's Athletic	36	15	5	16	51	47	+4	50	Qualification for Europa League first qualifying round
6	Bohemians	36	13	9	14	52	45	+7	48	
7	Sligo Rovers	36	12	6	18	38	50	−12	42	

Source: SSE Airtricity League, Soccerway
Rules for classification: 1) Points; 2) Goal difference; 3) Goals scored.

==== Results summary ====
Overall								Home						Away					
Pld	W	D	L	GF	GA	GD	Pts	W	D	L	GF	GA	GD	W	D	L	GF	GA	GD
36	15	5	16	51	47	+4	50	10	2	6	36	21	+15	5	3	10	15	26	−11

Last updated: 28 October 2018.

==== Results by round ====
Round	1	2	3	4	5	6	7	8	9	10	11	12	13	14	15	16	17	18	19	20	21	22	23	24	25	26	27	28	29	30	31	32	33	34	35	36
Ground	H	A	A	H	A	H	A	H	A	H	A	H	A	H	A	H	A	H	A	H	A	A	H	A	H	H	A	H	A	H	A	H	A	H	A	H
Result	L	W	L	W	W	D	L	W	L	W	L	W	D	D	L	W	W	W	L	L	L	L	L	L	L	W	L	W	D	W	W	L	D	L	W	W
Position	7	4	8	5	6	5	7	5	6	6	6	6	6	6	6	6	5	4	5	5	5	6	6	6	6	6	6	6	6	5	5	6	5	6	6	5

Updated to match(es) played on 28 October 2018. Source: 2018 League of Ireland Premier Division
A = Away; H = Home; W = Win; D = Draw; L = Loss

==== Matches ====
Win Draw Loss

16 February 2018 Round 1	St Patrick's Athletic	2–3	Cork City	Inchicore, Dublin 8
19:45 GMT	Ian Bermingham 35'; Conan Byrne (yellow card) 45'; Conan Byrne 46'; Darragh Markey (yellow card) 76'; Lee Desmond (yellow card) 86'; Simon Madden (yellow card) 90'		Barry McNamee 3'; Graham Cummins 11'; Graham Cummins (red card) 27'; Kieran Sadlier (yellow card) 36'; Steven Beattie (yellow card) 58'; Kieran Sadlier 82'; Barry McNamee (yellow card) 84'	Stadium: Richmond Park; Attendance: 2,771; Referee: Robert Harvey

23 February 2018 Round 2	Bray Wanderers	1–2	St Patrick's Athletic	Bray, County Wicklow
19:45 GMT	Gary McCabe 20'; Aaron Greene (yellow card) 50'		Conan Byrne 2'; Christy Fagan 14'; Owen Garvan (yellow card) 27'	Stadium: Carlisle Grounds; Attendance: 1,124; Referee: Graham Kelly

26 February 2018 Round 3	Waterford	2–0	St Patrick's Athletic	Waterford City, County Waterford
19:45 GMT	Kenny Browne 10'; Bastien Héry 61'; David Webster (yellow card) 85'; Kenny Browne (yellow card) 87'		Owen Garvan (yellow card) 22'; Jamie Lennon (yellow card) 54'	Stadium: RSC; Attendance: 1,859; Referee: Sean Grant

2 March 2018 Round 4	St Patrick's Athletic	P–P	Sligo Rovers	Inchicore, Dublin 8
19:45 GMT				Stadium: Richmond Park
Note: Postponed until 19 March due to red snow warning.

9 March 2018 Round 5	Bohemians	0–1	St Patrick's Athletic	Phibsborough, Dublin 7
19:45 GMT	Kevin Devaney (yellow card) 42'; Rob Cornwall (yellow card) 71'		Dean Clarke 14'; Kevin Toner (yellow card) 38'	Stadium: Dalymount Park; Attendance: 2,814; Referee: Rob Hennessy

12 March 2018 Round 6	St Patrick's Athletic	0–0	Dundalk	Inchicore, Dublin 8
19:45 GMT	Darragh Markey (yellow card) 35'; Owen Garvan (yellow card) 57'; Barry Murphy (yellow card) 88'		Daniel Cleary (yellow card) 32'; Patrick Hoban (yellow card) 53'	Stadium: Richmond Park; Attendance: 1,609; Referee: Rob Rogers

16 March 2018 Round 7	Shamrock Rovers	1–0	St Patrick's Athletic	Tallaght, Dublin 24
20:00 GMT	Ethan Boyle (yellow card) 12'; Kevin Toner 77' (o.g.)		Conan Byrne (yellow card) 40'; Kevin Toner (yellow card) 51'	Stadium: Tallaght Stadium; Attendance: 4,133; Referee: Derek Tomney

19 March 2018 Round 4	St Patrick's Athletic	P–P	Sligo Rovers	Inchicore, Dublin 8
15:00 GMT				Stadium: Richmond Park
Note: Originally due to be played on 2 March but was postponed due to red snow warning. Rescheduled game also postponed due to snow, rescheduled again for 15 May.

23 March 2018 Round 8	St Patrick's Athletic	1–0	Limerick	Inchicore, Dublin 8
19:45 GMT	Dean Clarke (yellow card) 36'; Jamie Lennon (yellow card) 43'; Ian Bermingham 55'		William Fitzgerald (yellow card) 23'; Henry Cameron (yellow card) 32'; Billy Dennehy (yellow card) 55'	Stadium: Richmond Park; Attendance: 1,178; Referee: Sean Grant

30 March 2018 Round 9	Derry City	2–1	St Patrick's Athletic	Derry, Northern Ireland
19:30 GMT	Aaron McEneff 10'; Rory Hale (yellow card) 42'; Aaron McEneff 74'		Ryan Brennan (yellow card) 68'; Dean Clarke 81'	Stadium: The Brandywell; Attendance: 2,460 (Est.); Referee: Rob Harvey

6 April 2018 Round 10	St Patrick's Athletic	5–0	Bray Wanderers	Inchicore, Dublin 8
19:45 GMT	Jake Keegan 18'; Simon Madden (yellow card) 22'; Kevin Toner 37'; Conan Byrne 41' (pen.); Jake Keegan 58'; Dean Clarke 62'		Daniel Kelly (yellow card) 23'; Conor Kenna (yellow card) 41'; Gary McCabe (yellow card) 65'	Stadium: Richmond Park; Attendance: 1,252; Referee: Ray Matthews

13 April 2018 Round 11	Cork City	1–0	St Patrick's Athletic	Turners Cross, County Cork
19:45 GMT	Colm Horgan (yellow card) 44'; Graham Cummins 49'		Ryan Brennan (yellow card) 39'	Stadium: Turners Cross; Attendance: 4,202; Referee: Robert Hennessey

16 April 2018 Round 12	St Patrick's Athletic	1–0	Waterford	Inchicore, Dublin 8
19:45 GMT	Dean Clarke (yellow card) 5'; Ryan Brennan 16'		Sander Puri (yellow card) 26'; Sander Puri (yellow card) 50' (red card); Gavan Holohan (red card) 73'	Stadium: Richmond Park; Attendance: 1,358; Referee: Graham Kelly

21 April 2018 Round 13	Sligo Rovers	0–0	St Patrick's Athletic	Sligo, County Sligo
19:45 GMT	Eduardo Pincelli (yellow card) 18'; Patrick McClean (yellow card) 53'; Adam Morgan (yellow card) 89'; David Cawley (red card) 90+4'; Jack Keaney (yellow card) 90+4'		Jamie Lennon (yellow card) 45'; Killian Brennan (yellow card) 90+4'	Stadium: The Showgrounds; Attendance: 1,473; Referee: John McLoughlin

27 April 2018 Round 14	St Patrick's Athletic	2–2	Bohemians	Inchicore, Dublin 8
19:45 GMT	Jake Keegan 3'; Jake Keegan 48'; Ryan Brennan (yellow card) 50'; Ryan Brennan (yellow card) 52' (red card); Thomas Byrne (yellow card) 83'		Keith Buckley (yellow card) 35'; Dan Byrne (yellow card) 39'; Eoghan Stokes (yellow card) 61'; Daniel Corcoran 72'; Kevin Devaney 90+4'	Stadium: Richmond Park; Attendance: 2,429; Referee: Tomas Connolly

30 April 2018 Round 15	Dundalk	5–0	St Patrick's Athletic	Dundalk, County Louth
19:45 GMT	Patrick Hoban 46'; Patrick Hoban 52'; Ronan Murray 66'; Michael Duffy 83'; Jamie McGrath 85'; Daniel Cleary (yellow card) 86'		Kevin Toner (yellow card) 25'; Thomas Byrne (yellow card) 86'	Stadium: Oriel Park; Attendance: 2,089; Referee: Paul McLaughlin

4 May 2018 Round 16	St Patrick's Athletic	2–0	Shamrock Rovers	Inchicore, Dublin 8
19:45 GMT	Graham Burke 56' (o.g.); Jake Keegan (yellow card) 79'; Killian Brennan 89' (pen.); Thomas Byrne (yellow card) 89'		Joey O'Brien (red card) 40'	Stadium: Richmond Park; Attendance: 2,918; Referee: Graham Kelly

11 May 2018 Round 17	Limerick	0–1	St Patrick's Athletic	Garryowen, County Limerick
19:45 GMT	Cian Coleman (yellow card) 21'; Killian Brouder (yellow card) 23'; Colm Walsh-O'Loughlen (yellow card) 25'; Eoin Wearen (yellow card) 90'		Killian Brennan (yellow card) 22'; Jamie Lennon (yellow card) 65'; Ryan Brennan 72'	Stadium: Markets Field; Attendance: 800 (Est.); Referee: Ray Matthews

15 May 2018 Round 4	St Patrick's Athletic	2–0	Sligo Rovers	Inchicore, Dublin 8
19:45 GMT	Jamie Lennon (yellow card) 45'; Dean Clarke 51'; Thomas Byrne 90' (pen.)		Greg Moorhouse (yellow card) 20'; Jack Keaney (yellow card) 32'; Lewis Morrison (yellow card) 90'	Stadium: Richmond Park; Attendance: 1,273; Referee: Rob Hennessey
Note: Originally due to be played on 2 March but was postponed until 19 March due to red snow warning. Rescheduled game was also postponed due to snow, rescheduled again for 15 May.

18 May 2018 Round 18	St Patrick's Athletic	5–2	Derry City	Inchicore, Dublin 8
19:45 GMT	Jake Keegan 7'; Conan Byrne 43' (pen.); Kevin Toner 45'; Thomas Byrne 54'; Darragh Markey 90'		Rory Patterson 6'; Darren Cole 17'; Gavin Peers (yellow card) 21'; Ger Doherty (yellow card) 42'; Rory Patterson (yellow card) 44'; Rory Hale (yellow card) 55'	Stadium: Richmond Park; Attendance: 1,650 (Est.); Referee: Ben Connolly

22 May 2018 Round 19	Shamrock Rovers	3–0	St Patrick's Athletic	Tallaght, Dublin 24
20:00 GMT	Lee Grace 17'; Ronan Finn 45+1'; Sam Bone 51'		Simon Madden (yellow card) 79'; Graham Kelly (yellow card) 89'	Stadium: Tallaght Stadium; Attendance: 3,016; Referee: Rob Rodgers

25 May 2018 Round 20	St Patrick's Athletic	1–3	Cork City	Inchicore, Dublin 8
19:45 GMT	Thomas Byrne (yellow card) 54'; Conan Byrne 60'; Graham Kelly (yellow card) 69'; Kevin Toner (yellow card) 73'		Kieran Sadlier 1' (pen.); Conor McCormack (yellow card) 65'; Jimmy Keohane 73'; Kieran Sadlier 90+4'	Stadium: Richmond Park; Attendance: 1,530; Referee: Neil Doyle

1 June 2018 Round 21	Bray Wanderers	3–1	St Patrick's Athletic	Bray, County Wicklow
19:45 GMT	Gary McCabe (yellow card) 38'; Cory Galvin 54'; Darragh Gibbons 68'; Daniel Kelly 90+2'		Ian Bermingham (yellow card) 43'; Thomas Byrne 87'; Thomas Byrne (red card) 90+4'; Killian Brennan (yellow card) 90+4'	Stadium: Carlisle Grounds; Attendance: 685; Referee: Paul McLaughlin

8 June 2018 Round 22	Waterford	2–0	St Patrick's Athletic	Waterford City, County Waterford
19:45 GMT	Bastien Héry (yellow card) 8'; Gavan Holohan (yellow card) 13'; Courtney Duffus 55'; Courtney Duffus (yellow card) 73'; Ismahil Akinade 76'; Rory Feely (yellow card) 80'		Kevin Toner (red card) 15'; Darragh Markey (yellow card) 63'	Stadium: RSC; Attendance: 1,862; Referee: Ray Matthews

15 June 2018 Round 23	St Patrick's Athletic	0–3	Sligo Rovers	Inchicore, Dublin 8
19:45 GMT	Ian Bermingham (yellow card) 29'		Patrick McClean 11'; Alistair Roy 29'; John Mahon (yellow card) 36'; Patrick McClean (yellow card) 48'; Regan Donelon (yellow card) 61'; Rhys McCabe (yellow card) 76'; Jack Keaney 82'	Stadium: Richmond Park; Attendance: 1,003; Referee: Derek Tomney

29 June 2018 Round 24	Bohemians	1–0	St Patrick's Athletic	Phibsborough, Dublin 7
19:45 GMT	Keivn Devaney 39'; Dan Casey (yellow card) 60'; Patrick Kavanagh (yellow card) 67'; Oscar Brennan (yellow card) 78'		Thomas Byrne (yellow card) 16'; Kevin Toner (yellow card) 60'; Ian Bermingham (yellow card) 71'; Killian Brennan (yellow card) 72'	Stadium: Dalymount Park; Attendance: 2,200 (Est.); Referee: Rob Hennessey

6 July 2018 Round 25	St Patrick's Athletic	1–3	Dundalk	Inchicore, Dublin 8
19:45 GMT	Kevin Toner (yellow card) 1'; Jake Keegan 25'		Jamie McGrath (yellow card) 18'; Patrick Hoban 50'; Chris Shields 58'; Patrick Hoban 90+4'	Stadium: Richmond Park; Attendance: 1,290; Referee: Neil Doyle

20 July 2018 Round 26	St Patrick's Athletic	2–1	Limerick	Inchicore, Dublin 8
19:45 GMT	Michael Leahy (yellow card) 32'; Conan Byrne 76' (pen.); Conan Byrne 90'; Dean Clarke (yellow card) 90'; Thomas Byrne (yellow card) 90'		Billy Dennehy 17' (pen.); Barry Maguire (yellow card) 45'; Connor Ellis (yellow card) 87'; Killian Kantwell (yellow card) 90'	Stadium: Richmond Park; Attendance: 1,005; Referee: Sean Grant

27 July 2018 Round 27	Derry City	2–1	St Patrick's Athletic	Derry, Northern Ireland
19:45 GMT	Ally Roy 3'; Jamie McDonagh (yellow card) 42'; Gerard Doherty (yellow card) 79'; Gavin Peers (yellow card) 83'; Rory Patterson 88'; Eoin Toal (red card) 90'		Jamie Lennon (yellow card) 32'; Ryan Brennan 34'; Ian Bermingham (yellow card) 87'; Ian Bermingham (red card) 90'; Thomas Byrne (red card) 90'; Ryan Brennan (yellow card) 90'	Stadium: The Brandywell; Attendance: 1,800 (Est.); Referee: Rob Harvey

3 August 2018 Round 28	St Patrick's Athletic	3–0	Bray Wanderers	Inchicore, Dublin 8
19:45 GMT	Ryan Brennan 32'; Ian Turner 55'; Jamie Lennon (yellow card) 67'; Graham Kelly 87'		Gary McCabe (yellow card) 62'; Gary McCabe (yellow card) 76' (red card)	Stadium: Richmond Park; Attendance: 1,146; Referee: Ray Matthews

17 August 2018 Round 29	Cork City	1–1	St Patrick's Athletic	Turners Cross, County Cork
19:45 GMT	Josh O'Hanlon 83'		Achille Campion (yellow card) 32'; Dean Clarke 56'; Brendan Clarke (yellow card) 90+4'	Stadium: Turners Cross; Attendance: 3,926; Referee: Robert Hennessy

31 August 2018 Round 30	St Patrick's Athletic	3–0	Waterford	Inchicore, Dublin 8
19:45 GMT	Darragh Markey (yellow card) 41'; Achille Campion 54'; Michael Leahy 68'; Michael Leahy 83'		Bastien Héry (yellow card) 15'; Kenny Browne (yellow card) 64'	Stadium: Richmond Park; Attendance: 1,428; Referee: Ben Connolly

15 September 2018 Round 31	Sligo Rovers	1–2	St Patrick's Athletic	Sligo, County Sligo
19:45 GMT	Jack Keaney (yellow card) 28'; Michael Drennan 40'; Seamus Sharkey (yellow card) 44'; Caolan McAleer (yellow card) 90+1'		Jake Keegan 30'; Brendan Clarke 55' (pen.)	Stadium: The Showgrounds; Attendance: 1,536; Referee: Robert Rogers

22 September 2018 Round 32	St Patrick's Athletic	1–3	Bohemians	Inchicore, Dublin 8
17:30 GMT	Achille Campion 4'; Achille Campion (yellow card) 63'; Lee Desmond (yellow card) 81'; Jamie Lennon (yellow card) 90'		Ali Reghba 27'; Ali Reghba (yellow card) 49'; Robbie McCourt 56'; Ali Reghba 83'	Stadium: Richmond Park; Attendance: 2,105; Referee: Rob Hennessy

5 October 2018 Round 33	Dundalk	1–1	St Patrick's Athletic	Dundalk, County Louth
19:45 GMT	Patrick Hoban 90'		Jamie Lennon (yellow card) 45'; Conor Clifford 52'	Stadium: Oriel Park; Attendance: 3,417; Referee: Robert Harvey

12 October 2018 Round 34	St Patrick's Athletic	0–1	Shamrock Rovers	Inchicore, Dublin 8
19:45 GMT	Jamie Lennon (yellow card) 53'; Ryan Brennan (yellow card) 70'		Daniel Carr 90'	Stadium: Richmond Park; Attendance: 2,064; Referee: Mareks Kere (Latvia)

19 October 2018 Round 35	Limerick	0–4	St Patrick's Athletic	Garryowen, County Limerick
19:45 GMT	Shaun Kelly (yellow card) 23'		Kevin Toner 10'; Jake Keegan 20'; Jack Brady 49' (o.g.); Simon Madden 50'	Stadium: Markets Field; Attendance: 450 (Est.); Referee: John McLoughlin

26 October 2018 Round 36	St Patrick's Athletic	5–0	Derry City	Inchicore, Dublin 8
19:45 GMT	Conor Clifford 29'; James Doona 37'; Kevin Toner 40'; Jake Keegan 55'; James Doona 57'; Thomas Byrne (yellow card) 71'; Kevin Toner (yellow card) 76'; Joe Manley (yellow card) 88'		Dean Shiels (yellow card) 33'; Gavin Peers (yellow card) 51'; Adrian Delap (yellow card) 62'; Aaron Splaine (yellow card) 76'	Stadium: Richmond Park; Attendance: 1,060; Referee: Tomas Connolly

=== FAI Cup ===
Win Draw Loss

10 August 2018 First Round	Inchicore Athletic	0–5	St Patrick's Athletic	Inchicore, Dublin 8
19:45 GMT	Leon Fahey-Byrne (yellow card) 25'; Leon Fahey-Byrne (yellow card) 46' (red card); Stephen Fay (yellow card) 64'		Darragh Markey 55'; Jake Keegan 76'; Conan Byrne 81' (pen.); Jake Keegan 85'; Simon Madden 88'	Stadium: Richmond Park; Attendance: 1,000 (Est.); Referee: Ben Connolly

24 August 2018 Second Round	Derry City	1–0	St Patrick's Athletic	Derry, Northern Ireland
19:45 GMT	Kevin McHattie (yellow card) 79'; Adrian Delap 80'		Ian Bermingham (yellow card) 39'	Stadium: The Brandywell; Attendance: 1,500 (Est.); Referee: Neil Doyle

=== EA Sports Cup ===
Win Draw Loss

2 April 2018 Second Round	St Patrick's Athletic	P–P	Dundalk	Inchicore, Dublin 8
15:00 GMT				Stadium: Richmond Park; Referee: Adriano Reale
Note: Postponed for 1 week due to an unplayable pitch.

9 April 2018 Second Round	St Patrick's Athletic	4–4 (a.e.t.) (7–8 p)	Dundalk	Inchicore, Dublin 8
19:45 GMT	Michael Barker (yellow card) 37'; Christy Fagan 58'; Graham Kelly 60'; Michael Leahy 97'; Michael Leahy 104'		Marco Tagbajumi 3'; Stephen O'Donnell (yellow card) 27'; Marco Tagbajumi (yellow card) 37'; Ronan Murray 45'; John Mountney (yellow card) 78'; Michael Leahy 102' (og.); Brian Gartland (yellow card) 108'; Stephen Folan (yellow card) 113'; Dane Massey 120'	Stadium: Richmond Park; Attendance: 800 (Est.); Referee: Adriano Reale
	Penalties
	Christy Fagan (penalty scored); Dean Clarke (penalty missed); James Doona (penalty scored); Graham Kelly (penalty scored); Jamie Lennon (penalty scored); Kevin Toner (penalty scored); Michael Leahy (penalty scored); Simon Madden (penalty scored); Darragh Markey (penalty missed)		Dane Massey (penalty missed); Jamie McGrath (penalty scored); Georgie Poynton (penalty scored); Krisztián Adorján (penalty scored); Brian Gartland (penalty scored); John Mountney (penalty scored); Stephen O'Donnell (penalty scored); Stephen Folan (penalty scored); Marco Tagbajumi (penalty scored)

=== Leinster Senior Cup ===
Win Draw Loss

4 February 2018 Fourth Round	Bray Wanderers	1–3	St Patrick's Athletic	Bray, County Wicklow
16:00 GMT	Hugh Douglas 70'; Gary McCabe (yellow card) 75'		Ryan Brennan 5'; Kevin Toner 7'; Christy Fagan 9'	Stadium: Carlisle Grounds; Attendance: 300 (Est.)

9 July 2018 Quarter Final	St Patrick's Athletic	5–0	Wexford	Inchicore, Dublin 8
19:45 GMT	Ian Turner 13'; Graham Kelly 21'; Thomas Byrne 25'; Michael Leahy 28'; Thomas Byrne (yellow card) 36'; Jake Keegan 85'			Stadium: Richmond Park; Attendance: 200 (Est.); Referee: Alex Patchel

3 September 2018 Semi Final	St Patrick's Athletic	1–0 (a.e.t.)	Dundalk	Inchicore, Dublin 8
19:45 GMT	Kevin Toner (yellow card) 88'; Kevin Toner 105+1'		Georgie Poynton (yellow card) 89'; TBC (yellow card) 98'	Stadium: Richmond Park; Attendance: 750 (Est.); Referee: Alan Patchell

28 September 2018 Final	Shelbourne	1–1 (a.e.t.) (6–5 p)	St Patrick's Athletic	Drumcondra, Dublin 3
19:45 GMT	Greg Moorhouse 84'; Adam Evans (yellow card) 86'; Reece McEnteer (yellow card) 120'		Jamie Lennon (yellow card) 57'; Kevin Toner (yellow card) 62'; Achille Campion (yellow card) 82'; Joe Manley (yellow card) 87'; Achille Campion 90+1'; Dean Clarke (yellow card) 109'; Dean Clarke (yellow card) 114' (yellow-red card)	Stadium: Tolka Park; Attendance: 1,000 (Est.); Referee: David Dunne
	Penalties
	David O'Sullivan (penalty scored); Greg Moorhouse (penalty scored); Dayle Rooney (penalty scored); Shane Farrell (penalty scored); Lorcan Fitzgerald (penalty scored); Adam Evans (penalty scored)		Conan Byrne (penalty scored); Brendan Clarke (penalty scored); Achille Campion (penalty scored); Ian Bermingham (penalty scored); Ryan Brennan (penalty scored); Kevin Toner (penalty missed)

=== Friendlies ===
Win Draw Loss

==== Pre-season ====
16 January 2018	St. Mochta's	P–P	St Patrick's Athletic	Blanchardstown, Dublin 15
19:45 GMT				Stadium: Porterstown Road

20 January 2018	Cabinteely	0–1	St Patrick's Athletic	Rathfarnham, Dublin 16
16:00 GMT			Christy Fagan	Stadium: Marlay Park

27 January 2018	St Patrick's Athletic	4–1	Longford Town	Blanchardstown, Dublin 15
18:00 GMT	Darragh Markey; Christy Fagan; Conan Byrne; Ian Bermingham		Sam Verdon (pen.)	Stadium: National Sports Campus; Attendance: N/A

1 February 2018	St Patrick's Athletic	4–0	Galway United	Blanchardstown, Dublin 15
19:45 GMT	Dean Clarke; Dean Clarke; Ian Turner; Darragh Markey			Stadium: National Sports Campus; Attendance: N/A

9 February 2018	St Patrick's Athletic	12–0	Sure Sports FC	Inchicore, Dublin 8
19:45 GMT	Christy Fagan 21', 25' (pen.); Simon Madden 33'; Kevin Toner 40'; Ian Turner 44', 78', 87'; Conan Byrne 47', 81', 85' (pen.); Dean Clarke 57', 73'			Stadium: Richmond Park; Attendance: 350 (Est.); Referee: Neil Doyle

==== Mid-season ====
17 July 2018	St Patrick's Athletic	0–2	Newcastle United	Inchicore, Dublin 8
19:45 GMT	James Doona (yellow card) 72'		Sean Longstaff 42'; Christian Atsu 84' (pen.)	Stadium: Richmond Park; Attendance: 5,000; Referee: Rob Rogers
