= Ian Turner (Irish footballer) =

Irish footballer (born 1989)

Personal information
- Date of birth: 19 April 1989 (age 37)
- Place of birth: Wilton, Cork, Ireland
- Position: Winger

Youth career
- Wilton United
- Cork City

Senior career*
| Years | Team | Apps | (Gls) |
| 2009–2014 | Cork City | 96 | (8) |
| 2014 | → Limerick (loan) | 15 | (2) |
| 2015 | Limerick | 32 | (8) |
| 2016 | Cork City | 14 | (0) |
| 2017 | Limerick | 9 | (1) |
| 2017–2018 | St Patrick's Athletic | 16 | (1) |
| 2019–2021 | Cobh Ramblers | 65 | (6) |
- * Club domestic league appearances and goals as of 22:15, 14 January 2022 (UTC)

Ian Turner (born 30 April 1989) is an Irish former professional footballer who played in the League of Ireland throughout his career. He started his career with Cork City, who he spent six and a half seasons with. He also spent two and a half years with Limerick and St Patrick's Athletic where he spent a year and a half, before playing for Cobh Ramblers for three years where he retired in January 2022.

== Career ==
=== Youth ===
Turner began his local career with Wilton United, where he was spotted by Cork City scouts. He made his way through City's youth ranks and was part of a hugely successful side that won the National Under 21 League. Turned and his teammates also played for the club's Futsal side in 2009 as they won the FAI Futsal Cup. Among Turner's teammates in his underage side were future Republic of Ireland internationals David Meyler and Kevin Long.

=== Cork City ===
Turner's first experience with the first team was when he was called up to the bench for two Setanta Sports Cup games against Sligo Rovers in late 2009 but he remained an unused substitute in both games. With Cork City in financial difficulties in 2009 which also saw them relegated to the League of Ireland First Division, the board had to piece a team together just days before the 2010 season. These misfortunes for the club were to be to Turners' gain as he made his senior debut in their league opener away to Derry City on 5 March 2010. Turner played as a fullback for the season and played in 29 of his side's 33 league games in his first season in senior football. Turner's first goal in senior football came on 8 October 2011 in a 4–0 win over Salthill Devon. Turner played 13 games on the wing for City as they secured the 2011 League of Ireland First Division title on the last day of the season with a 94th-minute winner vs Shelbourne, with Turner coming off the bench for Daryl Horgan three minutes before the goal was scored. 2012 saw Turner get his first taste of League of Ireland Premier Division football on the wing, playing 31 games in all competitions, scoring 3 goals. Turner's goalscoring improved considerably in 2013, as he scored 7 goals in 37 games. Cork's manager Tommy Dunne was replaced by John Caulfield. Following the managerial change, Turner played in just two of Cork's league games in the first half of the season and was loaned out to Limerick for the rest of the season.

=== Limerick ===
After featuring in 15 games and scoring twice for Limerick, his form impressed manager Martin Russell enough to offer Turner a permanent move to the club for 2015. On 15 May 2015, Limerick won the Munster Senior Cup, with Turner starting in a 1–0 win over Avondale United. After a terrible first half of the season, Limerick pulled off a miracle second half of the season, clawing themselves off the bottom of the table to finish in 11th place where they faced Finn Harps in the promotion/relegation playoffs. Unfortunately for Limerick and Turner, they were beaten 2–1 on aggregate by the Donegal side and were relegated to the League of Ireland First Division. On a personal level, Turner scored eight goals and was named League of Ireland Premier Division Player of the Month for October 2015.

=== Season back at Cork ===
Following Limerick's relegation and Turner's contrasting form, Cork City manager John Caulfield brought him back to Leeside for the 2016 season following two second-place finishes in a row for Cork. The season however turned out to be a bittersweet one for Turner as he played just 14 league games as they finished second again and was an unused substitute throughout Cork's UEFA Europa League campaign as they beat Linfield and BK Häcken before being knocked out by Belgian side KFC Genk. Turner was also an unused substitute for the 2016 FAI Cup Final as City beat Dundalk through a 120th-minute Sean Maguire winner at the Aviva Stadium.

=== Return to Limerick ===
With Limerick having won promotion back to the Premier Division and Turner out of favour at Cork, Martin Russell brought Turner back to the Markets Field for the 2017 season. With three teams facing automatic relegation that season, Limerick were struggling early on and Russell was replaced by Neil McDonald. McDonald looked to cut his squad and bring in his own players and once the mid-season transfer window opened, Turner had his contract cancelled by mutual consent.

=== St Patrick's Athletic ===
On 25 July 2017, Turner signed for Dublin club St Patrick's Athletic. With Pat's also in the relegation battle, manager Liam Buckley didn't have many opportunities to experiment with his side with wingers Conan Byrne and Billy Dennehy in flying form. Turner played 9 games in all competitions for Patrick's, mainly as a late substitute off the bench, as St Patrick's stayed up on the last day of the season with a 1–1 draw away to Derry City. On 12 December 2017, Turner, alongside goalkeeper Barry Murphy, signed a new contract with the Saints ahead of the 2018 season.

=== Cobh Ramblers ===
On 4 January 2019 it was announced that Turner had signed for League of Ireland First Division side Cobh Ramblers. He made 31 appearances in all competitions in his first season at Cobh, scoring three goals as his side finished sixth, just two places below the Playoffs. He signed a new one-year contract with the club on 9 December 2019. He signed a new contract for the 2021 season on 23 December 2020. Turner remained at Cobh for a total of three seasons and made a total of 74 appearances in all competitions for the club, scoring 7 goals. He announced his retirement from League of Ireland football on 14 January 2022.

== Honours ==
=== Club ===
Cork City

- League of Ireland First Division (1): 2011
- FAI Cup (1): 2016
- FAI Futsal Cup (1): 2009

Limerick

- Munster Senior Cup (1): 2015

=== Individual ===
- League of Ireland Premier Division Player of the Month (1): October 2015

== Career statistics ==
Professional appearances – correct as of 14 January 2022.

| Club | Division | Season | League | | Cup | | League Cup | | Europe | | Other | | Total | |
| Club | Division | Season | Apps | Goals | Apps | Goals | Apps | Goals | Apps | Goals | Apps | Goals | Apps | Goals |
|---|---|---|---|---|---|---|---|---|---|---|---|---|---|---|
| Cork City | League of Ireland Premier Division | 2009 | 0 | 0 | 0 | 0 | 0 | 0 | 0 | 0 | 0 | 0 | 0 | 0 |
| Cork City | League of Ireland First Division | 2010 | 29 | 0 | 3 | 0 | 2 | 0 | – | | – | | 34 | 0 |
| Cork City | League of Ireland First Division | 2011 | 13 | 1 | 3 | 0 | 4 | 0 | – | | 1 (Note: Appearances in Munster Senior Cup) | 0 | 21 | 1 |
| Cork City | League of Ireland Premier Division | 2012 | 25 | 3 | 2 | 0 | 2 | 0 | – | | 2 | 0 | 31 | 3 |
| Cork City | League of Ireland Premier Division | 2013 | 27 | 4 | 2 | 0 | 2 | 1 | – | | 6 (Note: Appearances in Setanta Sports Cup) | 2 | 37 | 7 |
| Cork City | League of Ireland Premier Division | 2014 | 2 | 0 | 1 | 1 | 1 | 0 | – | | 0 | 0 | 4 | 1 |
| Limerick (loan) | League of Ireland Premier Division | 2014 | 15 | 2 | – | | – | | – | | – | | 15 | 2 |
| Limerick | League of Ireland Premier Division | 2015 | 32 | 8 | 1 | 0 | 1 | 0 | – | | 5 (Note: 3 appearances in Munster Senior Cup, 2 appearances in LOI promotion/relegations Playoffs) | 0 | 39 | 8 |
| Cork City | League of Ireland Premier Division | 2016 | 14 | 0 | 1 | 0 | 2 | 1 | 0 (Note: Appearances in UEFA Europa League) | 0 | 2 (Note: 1 appearances in Munster Senior Cup, 1 appearances in President's Cup) | 0 | 19 | 1 |
| Cork City | Cork City Total | | 110 | 8 | 12 | 1 | 13 | 2 | 0 | 0 | 11 | 2 | 146 | 13 |
| Limerick | League of Ireland Premier Division | 2017 | 9 | 1 | – | | 0 | 0 | – | | 1 | 0 | 10 | 1 |
| Limerick | Limerick Total | | 56 | 11 | 1 | 0 | 1 | 0 | – | | 6 | 0 | 64 | 11 |
| St Patrick's Athletic | League of Ireland Premier Division | 2017 | 5 | 0 | 2 | 0 | – | | – | | 2 (Note: Appearances in Leinster Senior Cup) | 0 | 9 | 0 |
| St Patrick's Athletic | League of Ireland Premier Division | 2018 | 11 | 1 | 2 | 0 | 1 | 0 | – | | 2 | 1 | 16 | 2 |
| St Patrick's Athletic | St Patrick's Athletic Total | | 16 | 1 | 4 | 0 | 1 | 0 | – | | 4 | 1 | 27 | 2 |
| Cobh Ramblers | League of Ireland First Division | 2019 | 26 | 2 | 1 | 0 | 2 | 0 | – | | 2 | 1 | 31 | 3 |
| Cobh Ramblers | League of Ireland First Division | 2020 | 16 | 3 | 1 | 0 | – | | – | | 1 | 0 | 18 | 3 |
| Cobh Ramblers | League of Ireland First Division | 2021 | 23 | 1 | 2 | 0 | – | | – | | – | | 25 | 1 |
| Cobh Ramblers | Cobh Ramblers Total | | 65 | 6 | 4 | 0 | 2 | 0 | – | | 3 | 1 | 74 | 7 |
| Career Total | | | 247 | 26 | 21 | 1 | 17 | 2 | 0 | 0 | 24 | 4 | 311 | 33 |
