= 2018 League of Ireland Cup final =

- Event: 2018 League of Ireland Cup
Derry City	Cobh Ramblers
3	1
- Date: 16 September 2018
- Venue: Brandywell Stadium, Derry
- Referee: Ben Connolly
- Attendance: 3,500

The 2018 League of Ireland Cup final was the final match of the 2018 League of Ireland Cup, played between Derry City and Cobh Ramblers. The match was played on 16 September 2018. The match was won by Derry City, who claimed their record 11th League Cup trophy. The final was shown live on Eir Sport and was Cobh Ramblers first ever national cup final appearance.

== Match ==
16 September 2018	Derry City	3–1	Cobh Ramblers	Brandywell Stadium
	Ronan Hale 23'; Darren Cole 54'; Aaron McEneff 72'	Report	Chris Hull 26'	Attendance: 3,500; Referee: Ben Connolly.

== See also ==
- 2018 FAI Cup
- 2018 League of Ireland Premier Division
- 2018 League of Ireland Cup
