= Luke Heeney =

Irish footballer (born 1999)

Personal information
- Date of birth: 6 February 1999 (age 27)
- Place of birth: Bellewstown, County Meath, Ireland
- Positions: Midfielder; right back

Youth career
- –2015: St Kevin's Boys
- 2015–2018: St Patrick's Athletic

Senior career*
Years	Team	Apps	(Gls)
2018	St Patrick's Athletic	1	(0)
2019–2025	Drogheda United	173	(4)
2026	Waterford	30	(0)

International career^{‡}
2018	Republic of Ireland U19	2	(0)
- * Club domestic league appearances and goals as of 11:56, 9 November 2026 (UTC) ‡ National team caps and goals as of 23:30, 28 January 2025 (UTC)

Luke Heeney (born 6 February 1999) is an Irish professional footballer who plays as a midfielder or right back. He previously played for St Patrick's Athletic, Drogheda United and Waterford.

== Career ==
=== Youth career ===
Bellewstown, County Meath native Heeney began playing with St Kevin's Boys, before joining the academy of League of Ireland club St Patrick's Athletic in 2015, playing for their under-17 side for two seasons before going on to play for their under-19 side for a further two seasons.

=== St Patrick's Athletic ===
Heeney made his first team debut on 5 October 2018, replacing Jake Keegan from the bench in the 91st minute of a 1–1 draw away to Dundalk at Oriel Park in what proved to be his only senior appearance for the club.

=== Drogheda United ===
Ahead of the 2019 season, Heeney signed for his local League of Ireland First Division club Drogheda United. He made his debut in the opening game of the season on 22 February 2019, in a 4–0 win over Cobh Ramblers at United Park. On 8 June 2019, he scored the first goal of his senior career, adding his side's third goal in a 4–2 win at home to Athlone Town. Heeney made just 9 appearances in 2020 due to injury, but in the final of those 9 on 27 October 2020, he scored in a 2–0 win away to Cabinteely at Stradbrook Road to secure the 2020 League of Ireland First Division title and promotion for his side. He made 31 appearances in all competitions in his side's first season back in the top flight as they avoided the Promotion/Relegation Playoff by 2 points. On 10 December 2021, he signed a new contract with the club. In early 2022, he was involved in a car crash that saw him miss several games while he recovered from his injuries. He made 32 appearances in all competitions during the 2023 season and on 19 December 2023, he signed a new contract with the club. On 23 September 2024, he made his 150th appearance for the club in a 0–0 draw with Galway United. Heeney came off the bench in the 2024 FAI Cup final on 11 November 2024, as his side defeated Derry City 2–0 at the Aviva Stadium to win the Cup. On 16 November 2024, he helped his side to a 3–1 win over Bray Wanderers at Tallaght Stadium in the 2024 League of Ireland Premier Division Promotion/Relegation Playoff. On 20 December 2024, he renewed his contract with Drogheda amidst reported interest from rivals Dundalk, having been praised as the club's standout player in 2024 by manager Kevin Doherty. He scored 2 goals in 41 appearances in the 2025 season. On 19 November 2025, it was announced that Heeney would be departing the club after scoring 4 goals in 197 appearances in 7 seasons with the club.

=== Waterford ===
On 2 December 2025, Heeney signed for League of Ireland Premier Division club Waterford ahead of the 2026 season, becoming new manager Jon Daly's first new signing with the club. On 8 November 2026, he came off the bench late on in the 2026 FAI Cup final as his side were defeated 1–0 by Derry City at the Aviva Stadium. On 11 November 2026, it was announced that Heeney had departed the club following the end of his contract, having made 35 appearances during his year there.

== International career ==
Heeney made 2 appearances for the Republic of Ireland U19 side in February 2018 in 2 friendlies against Romania U19, winning 1–0 and 2–1.

== Career statistics ==
As of match played on 8 November 2026

Appearances and goals by club, season and competition
Club	Season	League			National Cup (Note: Includes FAI Cup)		League Cup (Note: Includes League of Ireland Cup)		Other		Total	
Club	Season	Division	Apps	Goals	Apps	Goals	Apps	Goals	Apps	Goals	Apps	Goals
St Patrick's Athletic	2018	LOI Premier Division	1	0	0	0	0	0	0 (Note: Appearance(s) in the Leinster Senior Cup)	0	1	0
Drogheda United	2019	LOI First Division	24	1	1	0	1	0	4 (Note: Appearances in the 2019 League of Ireland First Division Promotion Playoffs)	0	30	1
Drogheda United	2020	LOI First Division	9	1	0	0	—		—		9	1
Drogheda United	2021	LOI Premier Division	30	0	1	0	—		—		31	0
Drogheda United	2022	LOI Premier Division	16	0	1	0	—		—		17	0
Drogheda United	2023	LOI Premier Division	28	0	3	0	—		0	0	31	0
Drogheda United	2024	LOI Premier Division	30	0	5	0	—		3 (Note: 1 appearance in the 2024 League of Ireland Premier Division Promotion/Relegation Playoff; 2 appearances in the Leinster Senior Cup)	0	38	0
Drogheda United	2025	LOI Premier Division	35	2	3	0	—		3 (Note: 1 appearance in the President of Ireland's Cup; 2 appearances in the Leinster Senior Cup)	0	41	2
Drogheda United	Total		173	4	14	0	1	0	10	0	197	4
Waterford	2026	LOI Premier Division	30	0	5	0	—		0 (Note: Appearance(s) in the Munster Senior Cup)	0	35	0
Career Total			204	4	19	0	1	0	10	0	233	4
