= 2018 FAI Cup =

Irish Daily Mail FAI Cup

Tournament details
- Country: Republic of Ireland

Final positions
- Champions: Dundalk (11th title)
- Runners-up: Cork City

Tournament statistics
- Matches played: 40
- Goals scored: 152 (3.8 per match)
- Top goal scorer: Kieran Sadlier (7 goals)

The 2018 FAI Cup (known as the Irish Daily Mail FAI Cup for sponsorship purposes) was the 98th edition of the Republic of Ireland's primary national cup competition. It began with the qualifying round on 21 April 2018, and concluded with the final on 4 November 2018. The winner qualified for the 2019–20 Europa League first qualifying round.

Cork City were the defending champions but lost in the final 2–1 to Dundalk.

== Qualifying round ==
The draw for the qualifying round was made on 4 April 2018. FAI President Tony Fitzgerald was joined by Dundalk goalkeeper and three-time winner Gary Rogers and Irish Daily Mail Circulation Manager, David Vaz, to perform the draw.

A total of 20 teams entered the qualifying round, with four teams (Home Farm, Cockhill Celtic, Newmarket Celtic and Blarney United) receiving a bye to the first round proper. The remaining 16 teams played eight games, with the winners entering the first round proper.

The Irish Daily Mail introduced a cash prize for the non-league team that advanced the furthest in the competition, providing extra motivation for lower-tier clubs to excel.

21 April 2018	Avondale United	0–2	Pike Rovers	Carrigaline
14:00		Report	McGann 15' (pen.); Collins 70'	Stadium: Avondale Park

21 April 2018	Leeds	3–1	St. Michael's	Ballyvolane
15:00		Report		Stadium: Leeds Park

21 April 2018	Maynooth University Town	2–2 (a.e.t.) (4–3 p)	Everton	Maynooth
16:00	35'; 36'	Report	Spitere 18'; Murphy 55'	Stadium: Maynooth University

21 April 2018	Inchicore Athletic	1–1 (a.e.t.) (4–3 p)	Crumlin United	Inchicore
19:00	Geraghty	Report	Donnelly (pen.)	Stadium: Pearse Park

22 April 2018	Dublin Bus	4–2	Firhouse Clover	Clondalkin
11:00	Sasaki 4', 34'; Dunne 31'; McMahon 69'	Report	70'; 90'	Stadium: Coldcut Road

22 April 2018	Kilnamanagh	1–2	Skerries Town	Kilnamanagh
11:00	Collins	Report		Stadium: Ned Kelly Park

22 April 2018	CIÉ Ranch	1–0	Letterkenny Rovers	Ballyfermot
14:00	Sullivan 70'	Report		Stadium: CIÉ Works

22 April 2018	North End United	2–0	Cherry Orchard	Curracloe
14:00	Murphy 65' (pen.); Beary 86'	Report		Stadium: The River Field

== First round ==
The draw for the first round proper was made on 4 July 2018 at the Aviva Stadium, with Damien Duff as special guest. 12 non-League teams entered the draw along with the 20 teams from the League of Ireland.

Fixtures took place on the week ending 12 August 2018.

10 August 2018	Drogheda United	1–0	Shamrock Rovers	Drogheda
19:45	Lyons 23'	Report		Stadium: United Park; Attendance: 1,000 (est.); Referee: Paul McLaughlin

10 August 2018	UCD	2–0	Pike Rovers	Belfield
19:45	Molloy 24'; Davis 86'	Report		Stadium: UCD Bowl; Attendance: 150 (est.); Referee: Alan Patchell

10 August 2018	Shelbourne	4–0	Athlone Town	Drumcondra
19:45	Kalandarishvili 40' (o.g.); Kavanagh 62'; Moorhouse 84'; Fitzgerald 90+1'	Report		Stadium: Tolka Park; Attendance: 374; Referee: Adriano Reale

10 August 2018	Inchicore Athletic	0–5	St Patrick's Athletic	Inchicore
19:45		Report	Markey 55'; Keegan 76', 85'; Byrne 81'; Madden 87'	Stadium: Richmond Park; Attendance: 1,000 (est.); Referee: Ben Connolly

10 August 2018	Dundalk	3–0	Cobh Ramblers	Dundalk
19:45	Murray 32', 85'; McGrath 52'	Report		Stadium: Oriel Park; Referee: Robert Rogers

10 August 2018	Bray Wanderers	1–3 (a.e.t.)	Finn Harps	Bray
19:45	Pender 15'	Report	Todd 64'; Place 97'; Borg 112'	Stadium: Carlisle Grounds; Attendance: 410; Referee: Robert Harvey

10 August 2018	Wexford	0–7	Bohemians	Crossabeg
20:00		Report	Lunney 4'; Corcoran 9', 58'; Kelly 15'; Ward 29'; Stokes 70'; Magerusan 79'	Stadium: Ferrycarrig Park; Referee: Graham Kelly

11 August 2018	Blarney United	2–12	Derry City	Blarney
17:00	Welch 73'; Carroll 74'	Report	Hale 4', 46'; McEneff 7', 31'; Roy 8', 20', 34', 58'; McNamee 53', 83'; Farren 70'; McHattie 77'	Stadium: O'Shea Park; Referee: Anthony Buttimer

11 August 2018	Newmarket Celtic	1–2	Cabinteely	Ennis
18:00	Hayes 82'	Report	Doyle 70'; Clucas 74'	Stadium: Frank Healy Park; Referee: Robert Hennessy

11 August 2018	Skerries Town	1–4	Waterford	Skerries
17:00	Snowe 53'	Report	Noel Hunt 23', 85', 89'; Gavan Holohan 36'	Stadium: Skerries Rugby Club; Referee: David Dunne

11 August 2018	Sligo Rovers	0–1	Longford Town	Sligo
19:45		Report	Hollywood 65'	Stadium: The Showgrounds; Referee: Neil Doyle

11 August 2018	Maynooth University Town	2–0	Leeds	Maynooth
17:00	Daly 46'; Duffy 90+3'	Report		Stadium: Maynooth University Astro; Referee: Eddie Reilly

11 August 2018	North End United	0–4	Galway United	Crossabeg
18:00		Report	McCormack 9', 43', 44'; Barry 14'	Stadium: Ferrycarrig Park; Referee: Eoghan O'Shea

11 August 2018	Dublin Bus	0–1	CIÉ Ranch	Clondalkin
15:00		Report	O'Brien 90+3'	Stadium: Coldcut Road; Referee: Johnny Glynn

12 August 2018	Home Farm	1–5	Cork City	Whitehall
13:00	Goulding 35'	Report	O'Hanlon 3'; Coughlan 8', 12'; McNamee 32'; Sadlier 44'	Stadium: Whitehall Stadium; Referee: Robert Rogers

12 August 2018	Cockhill Celtic	0–2	Limerick	Buncrana
15:00		Report	Brouder 48'; Maguire 74'	Stadium: Charlie O'Donnell Sports Grounds; Referee: Michael Connolly

== Second round ==
The second round draw was held on 13 August 2018, producing just one all-Premier Division tie.

All fixtures were played on the weekend ending August 26

24 August 2018	CIÉ Ranch	2–6 (a.e.t.)	UCD	Newcastle
19:45	Tobin 9' (o.g.); Smith 16'	Report	Mahdy 32', 107'; McClelland 89', 110'; McDonald 99'; O'Neill 117'	Stadium: Greenogue; Attendance: 200 (est.); Referee: Robert Rogers

24 August 2018	Galway United	0–2	Bohemians	Galway
19:45		Report	Leahy 6'; Stokes 79'	Stadium: Eamonn Deacy Park; Attendance: 733; Referee: Robert Hennessy

24 August 2018	Derry City	1–0	St Patrick's Athletic	Derry
19:45	Delap 80'	Report		Stadium: Brandywell Stadium; Attendance: 1,500 (est.); Referee: Neil Doyle

24 August 2018	Dundalk	2–0	Finn Harps	Dundalk
19:45	Murray 24' (pen.); Kelly 52'	Report		Stadium: Oriel Park; Attendance: 1,823; Referee: Paul McLaughlin

24 August 2018	Cork City	4–0	Maynooth University Town	Cork
19:45	Barry 21'; Sadlier 56'; O’Hanlon 64' (pen.); Coughlan 71'	Report		Stadium: Turners Cross; Attendance: 1,016; Referee: Sean Grant

24 August 2018	Drogheda United	0–1	Waterford	Drogheda
19:45		Report	Héry 4'	Stadium: United Park; Attendance: 600 (est.); Referee: Robert Harvey

24 August 2018	Limerick	2–1	Cabinteely	Limerick
19:45	Ellis 29'; Maguire 67'	Report	Knight 90'	Stadium: Markets Field; Referee: Anthony Buttimer

25 August 2018	Longford Town	2–0	Shelbourne	Longford
19:30	McGlade 9' (pen.); O'Reilly 72'	Report		Stadium: City Calling Stadium; Referee: John McLoughlin

== Quarter-finals ==
The draw for the quarter-finals was broadcast live on RTÉ2's Soccer Republic on 27 August 2018.

All fixtures were set to be played on the week ending 9 September 2018. The game between Derry City and Bohemians was postponed until 19 September as Derry City had four players called up to under-21 squads.

The game between Longford Town and Cork City was televised live on RTÉ2.

7 September 2018	UCD	2–1	Waterford	Belfield
19:45	Davis 20'; Molloy 27'; Osam (yellow card) 67'	Report	Aborah 78' (pen.); Webster (yellow card) 90+2'	Stadium: UCD Bowl; Attendance: 750 (estimate); Referee: John McLoughlin

7 September 2018	Limerick	0–4	Dundalk	Limerick
19:45	O'Sullivan (yellow card) 20'; Maguire (yellow card) 59'; Coleman (yellow card) 70'	Report	Hoban 5', 21'; Mountney 36'; Kelly 71'	Stadium: Markets Field; Referee: Derek Tomney

7 September 2018	Longford Town	0–7	Cork City	Longford
19:30	Meenan (red card) 39'	Report	Morrissey 20'; Sadlier 23', 64', 88'; Coughlan 53'; O'Hanlon 75'; McNamee 89'	Stadium: City Calling Stadium; Referee: Raymond Matthews

19 September 2018	Derry City	1–3	Bohemians	Derry
19:45	McHattie (yellow card) 36'; Hale (yellow card) 42'; Shiels (yellow card) 61'; Shiels (yellow card) 61'Roy 62'; Hale (yellow card) 79'; Low (yellow card) 90'	Report	Casey 42'; Corcoran 59', 90'; Pender (yellow card) 66'; Devaney (yellow card) 90'	Stadium: Brandywell Stadium; Referee: Robert Harvey

== Semi-finals ==
The draw for the semi-finals was broadcast live on RTÉ2's Soccer Republic on 10 September 2018.

Both games were played the weekend ending 30 September and televised live on RTÉ2. The subsequent replay between Cork City and Bohemians was also broadcast live on RTÉ2.

28 September 2018	Dundalk	1–0	UCD	Dundalk
19:45	McEleney 41'	Report		Stadium: Oriel Park; Attendance: 2,926; Referee: Robert Hennessy

30 September 2018	Bohemians	1–1	Cork City	Phibsborough
17:45	Corcoran 68'	Report	Sadlier 87' (pen.)	Stadium: Dalymount Park; Attendance: 3,207; Referee: Rob Rogers

8 October 2018 Replay	Cork City	2–1	Bohemians	Cork
19:30	Cummins 30'; Sheppard 36'	Report	Morris 59'	Stadium: Turners Cross; Attendance: 2,347; Referee: Neil Doyle

== Final ==
4 November 2018
16:40

Cork City	1–2	Dundalk
Sadlier 21' (pen.)	Report	Hoare 19'; McEleney 73'

Aviva Stadium, Dublin
Attendance: 30,412
Referee: Neil Doyle

== See also ==
- 2018 League of Ireland Premier Division
- 2018 League of Ireland First Division
- 2018 League of Ireland Cup
