= Mick Leahy (footballer) =

Irish footballer (born 1989)

Personal information
- Date of birth: 30 April 1989 (age 37)
- Place of birth: Dublin, Ireland
- Position: Centre back

Youth career
- Belvedere
- 2007–2009: UCD

Senior career*
Years	Team	Apps	(Gls)
2009–2013	UCD	88	(3)
2014	Limerick	7	(0)
2015	UCD	25	(4)
2016–2017	Sligo Rovers	53	(4)
2018	St Patrick's Athletic	10	(2)
- * Club domestic league appearances and goals

Michael Leahy (born 30 April 1989) is an Irish former professional footballer who played for League of Ireland clubs UCD, Limerick, Sligo Rovers and St Patrick's Athletic. After retiring, he began to work with FIFPRO.

== Career ==
=== UCD ===
Leahy started playing football with Belvedere before signing for his local League of Ireland side UCD in 2007, where he played in their underage sides for 2 years. He made his debut in senior football as a 19-year-old, on 6 March 2009 on the opening day of the 2009 League of Ireland First Division season, a 2–1 win over Limerick. He went on to make 7 more appearances for the first team that season as they went on to win the league, gaining promotion to the League of Ireland Premier Division. The 2010 season saw Leahy get his first taste of Premier Division football as he played in 13 league games, scoring his first career goal on 29 October away to Sporting Fingal. 2011 saw Leahy establish himself as a first choice centre back in the team, being made club captain by manager Martin Russell and also playing 37 games in all competitions. He played 29 league games in 2012 as UCD finished 9th. The following season in 2013 however was hampered by injuries for Leahy as he missed the majority of the season through injury but played in the last 10 games of the season.

=== Limerick spell and return to UCD ===
Leahy signed for Limerick ahead of the 2014 League of Ireland season, his first full-time professional contract. On 27 May 2014, Leahy played in the Munster Senior Cup Final as Limerick lost 2–1 to Douglas Hall. The season turned out to be a disaster for Leahy as he again missed the vast majority through injury, playing just 7 league games for Limerick, leaving him only with contract offers from bottom half teams for the following season. For this reason Leahy returned to part-time football, signing back for UCD in the First Division, playing whilst also studying to become a solicitor. Despite being relegated the previous season, UCD qualified via Fair Play to play in the 2015–16 UEFA Europa League qualifiers. This gave Leahy his first taste of European football as he played in both games as they knocked out F91 Dudelange of Luxembourg, before being knocked out by Slovakia's ŠK Slovan Bratislava. He scored 4 goals as UCD made the promotion play-offs but were beaten over 2 legs by Finn Harps in the semi-finals.

=== Sligo Rovers ===
Leahy went on trial with Sligo Rovers in pre-season, impressing manager Dave Robertson and signing for the Bit 'O' Red ahead of the 2016 season. He was a key figure for Rovers as they finished in an impressive 5th place. On 16 November 2016, Leahy signed a new one-year contract with Sligo for the 2017 season. The season turned out to be a poor one for Sligo as their poor form saw Robertson sacked and replaced by Gerard Lyttle. Leahy's form was impressive however as he scored 4 vital goals over the season that helped Sligo stay up, as it took them until the final game of the season to secure their Premier Division status.

=== St Patrick's Athletic ===
Leahy returned to Dublin and signed for St Patrick's Athletic on 17 January 2018, given the number 23 shirt. Leahy made his debut on 9 April 2018 in the League Cup at home to Dundalk as the Saints lost 8–7 in a penalty shootout following a 4–4 draw after extra time. The game was a very eventful debut for Leahy as, in a seven-minute spell in the first half of extra time, he scored his first goal for Pats by heading in a James Doona corner, he then scored an own goal at the other end, and then restored the Saints lead with a second goal, a diving header from another Doona set piece, all of this while also scoring his penalty in the shootout.

== Personal life ==
After leaving St Patrick's Athletic, Leahy moved to Australia in 2019 for a year playing semi-professionally over there before, before returning home and then moving to Amsterdam in late 2020, to join the Global Policy & Strategic Relations team at FIFPRO.

== Career statistics ==
Professional appearances – correct as of 13 December 2018.

Club	Division	Season	League		Cup		League Cup		Europe		Other		Total	
Club	Division	Season	Apps	Goals	Apps	Goals	Apps	Goals	Apps	Goals	Apps	Goals	Apps	Goals
UCD	League of Ireland First Division	2009	7	0	0	0	3	0	–	–	–	–	10	0
UCD	League of Ireland Premier Division	2010	13	1	0	0	2	0	–	–	2 (Note: Appearances in Leinster Senior Cup)	0	17	1
UCD	League of Ireland Premier Division	2011	30	1	3	0	2	1	–	–	2 (Note: Appearances in Setanta Sports Cup)	0	37	2
UCD	League of Ireland Premier Division	2012	28	1	2	0	0	0	–	–	0	0	30	1
UCD	League of Ireland Premier Division	2013	10	0	0	0	0	0	–	–	0	0	10	0
Limerick	League of Ireland Premier Division	2014	7	0	0	0	0	0	–	–	1 (Note: Appearances in Munster Senior Cup)	0	8	0
UCD	League of Ireland First Division	2015	25	4	1	0	0	0	4 (Note: Appearances in UEFA Europa League)	0	1	0	31	4
Sligo Rovers	League of Ireland Premier Division	2016	26	0	2	0	1	0	–	–	–	–	29	0
Sligo Rovers	League of Ireland Premier Division	2017	27	4	1	0	1	0	–	–	0	0	29	4
St Patrick's Athletic	League of Ireland Premier Division	2018	10	2	1	0	1	2	–	–	2	1	14	5
UCD Total			113	7	6	0	7	1	4	0	5	0	135	8
Sligo Rovers Total			53	4	3	0	2	0	–	–	–	–	58	4
Career Total			184	13	10	0	10	3	4	0	8	1	206	17
