= Simon Madden (Irish footballer) =

Irish footballer

Personal information
- Full name: Simon Francis Madden
- Date of birth: 1 May 1988 (age 38)
- Place of birth: Dublin, Ireland
- Height: 1.78 m (5 ft 10 in)
- Position: Right back

Youth career
- Tymon Bawn
- Kilnamanagh
- Cherry Orchard
- –2004: Shelbourne
- 2004–2006: Leeds United

Senior career*
Years	Team	Apps	(Gls)
2006–2008	Leeds United	0	(0)
2008–2009	Shamrock Rovers	26	(0)
2010	Darlington	14	(0)
2010–2011	Dundalk	51	(0)
2012–2013	Derry City	62	(2)
2014–2017	Shamrock Rovers	130	(2)
2018–2020	St Patrick's Athletic	64	(2)

International career^{‡}
2008	Republic of Ireland U21	3	(0)
2011	League of Ireland XI	1	(0)
- * Club domestic league appearances and goals as of 10:02, 8 December 2020 (UTC) ‡ National team caps and goals as of 15 January 2010 (UTC)

Simon Francis Madden (born 1 May 1988) is an Irish former professional footballer who played for Leeds United, Shamrock Rovers over two spells, Darlington, Dundalk, Derry City and St Patrick's Athletic.

== Career ==
=== Leeds United ===
Born in Dublin, Madden joined Leeds United as a trainee in 2004 and became a professional in 2006. The young right back made his debut against Bury in a Football League Trophy match. The game ended in a 2–1 defeat. In April 2008, Madden had an unsuccessful trial with Cheltenham Town. A few days later, he was released from his contract with Leeds United.

=== Shamrock Rovers ===
He signed for Shamrock Rovers shortly after and Tallaght-based Madden made his Rovers debut against St Patrick's Athletic on 21 July 2008. Having already played for the Republic of Ireland at under-19 level, he earned his first cap with teammate Padraig Amond for the Republic of Ireland U-21s game in Austria on 19 August 2008, his second cap in Bulgaria, and his third cap in Portugal. He was released by the Hoops at the end of the 2009 season

=== Darlington ===
Madden followed his ex-teammate Tadhg Purcell in signing for Darlington in January 2010. Madden made his debut for Darlington on 23 January against Crewe Alexandra, coming on as a substitute in the game, which ended in a 3–0 loss for his new club. He was released by the club following their relegation from League 2, along with 13 other players.

=== Dundalk ===
Madden returned to the League of Ireland when he joined Dundalk on 22 July, the morning of the home leg of the club's 2010–11 UEFA Europa League with PFC Levski Sofia, becoming Ian Fosters second signing of the transfer window as he followed Steven Lennon in the door at Oriel Park. Three days later he made his debut when starting at left-back against Galway United at Terryland Park The young defender made a huge impression after arriving at the club and he went on to make the right-back position his own, replacing regular number two Shaun Kelly. In total, he made 16 appearances in all competitions, and his performances earned him a new one-year deal which he agreed with the club on 28 October, just over 24 hours before Dundalk's final game of the 2010 season. Following the departure of club captain Liam Burns, Simon was handed the armband by Foster in 2011 pre-season and kept hold of it, with his ultra-consistent performances showing exactly why he was given the responsibility. He went on to become the only one of the squad to play every minute of competitive action during the year. Overall, Madden played every second of the club's 66 competitive games after signing, reaching the half century away to Derry City on 22 July. He made his 50th league appearance for the club in a 1–0 home win over Drogheda United in the Louth Derby on 21 October.

=== Derry City ===
At the start of 2012 he signed for Derry City He made his club debut against Bohemians on the opening night of the 2012 League of Ireland season and was an instant hit with the Derry fans. He made 28 league appearances and also picked up a 2012 FAI Cup winners medal as Derry defeated St Patrick's Athletic in the final In November 2012, Madden signed a one-year contract extension at the club, citing the chance to play in European competition as one of the main reasons for staying. This was to be a great season for Simon as he played all thirty-three games during the season, scoring once in the last game as Derry beat Limerick 6–0. He picked up numerous man of the match awards and was named in the RTÉ Team of the Year. Derry came 4th and earned a place in the Europa League qualifiers for the following season. Madden played in the two ties against Trabzonspor in the 2013–14 UEFA Europa League.

=== Rovers Return ===
Madden re-signed with Shamrock Rovers for the 2014 season. Madden went on to make 32 league appearances for Rovers in his first season back in Tallaght. He scored in the 1–0 win against Sligo Rovers. In 2015 Madden stayed at Rovers and played ever League game as Rovers finished in 3rd place in the League of Ireland Premier Division. He also played in all of Rovers Europa League games. Madden again played all of Rovers league games in 2016 as they finished in 4th place in the league. Madden won Rovers player of the year award for 2016. Madden played his fourth season with Rovers in 2017 and was ever present as Rovers finished 3rd. He scored a late winner against Finn Harps in a 3–2 win. Madden left Rovers at the end of the 2017 season after four impressive seasons with the club.

=== St Patrick's Athletic ===
It was announced on 7 December 2017 that Madden had signed with St Patrick's Athletic for the 2018 season. He signed a new two-year contract with the club on 26 October 2018. He played in 73 matches over his first two seasons with St Pat's and scored 3 goals.

== Personal life ==
In 2019, Madden became the Director of Football at Dublin club St Francis.

== Career statistics ==
Professional appearances – correct as of 8 December 2020.

Club	Division	Season	League		Cup		League Cup		Europe		Other		Total	
Club	Division	Season	Apps	Goals	Apps	Goals	Apps	Goals	Apps	Goals	Apps	Goals	Apps	Goals
Leeds United	EFL Championship	2006–07	0	0	0	0	0	0	—		—		0	0
Leeds United	EFL League One	2007–08	0	0	0	0	0	0	—		1 (Note: Appearances in EFL Trophy)	0	1	0
Shamrock Rovers	League of Ireland Premier Division	2008	16	0	1	0	0	0	—		—		17	0
Shamrock Rovers	League of Ireland Premier Division	2009	10	0	0	0	1	0	—		—		11	0
Darlington	EFL League Two	2009–10	14	0	0	0	0	0	—		0	0	14	0
Dundalk	League of Ireland Premier Division	2010	15	0	0	0	1	0	0 (Note: Appearances in UEFA Europa League)	0	—		16	0
Dundalk	League of Ireland Premier Division	2011	36	0	4	0	1	0	—		8 (Note: 7 appearances in Setanta Sports Cup, 1 appearance in Leinster Senior Cup)	0	49	0
Dundalk	Dundalk Total		51	0	4	0	2	0	0	0	8	0	65	0
Derry City	League of Ireland Premier Division	2012	29	1	5	0	2	0	—		7 (Note: Appearances in Setanta Sports Cup)	1	43	2
Derry City	League of Ireland Premier Division	2013	33	1	1	0	2	0	2	0	2	0	40	1
Derry City	Derry City Total		62	2	6	0	4	0	2	0	9	1	83	3
Shamrock Rovers	League of Ireland Premier Division	2014	32	1	4	0	3	0	—		4 (Note: 3 appearances in Setanta Sports Cup, 1 appearance 1 goal in Leinster Senior Cup)	1	43	2
Shamrock Rovers	League of Ireland Premier Division	2015	33	0	1	0	1	0	4	0	0 (Note: Appearances in Leinster Senior Cup)	0	39	0
Shamrock Rovers	League of Ireland Premier Division	2016	33	0	3	1	1	0	2	0	0	0	39	1
Shamrock Rovers	League of Ireland Premier Division	2017	32	1	4	0	3	0	4	0	0	0	43	1
Shamrock Rovers	Shamrock Rovers Total		156	2	13	1	9	0	10	0	4	1	192	4
St Patrick's Athletic	League of Ireland Premier Division	2018	36	1	2	1	1	0	—		2	0	41	2
St Patrick's Athletic	League of Ireland Premier Division	2019	28	1	1	0	1	0	2	0	0	0	32	1
St Patrick's Athletic	League of Ireland Premier Division	2020	0	0	0	0	—		—		—		0	0
St Patrick's Athletic	St Patrick's Athletic Total		64	2	3	1	2	0	2	0	2	0	73	3
Career Total			347	6	26	2	17	0	12	0	24	2	428	10

== Honours ==
Derry City

- FAI Cup: 2012
