= Kevin Toner =

Irish footballer

Personal information
- Full name: Kevin Stephen Toner
- Date of birth: 18 July 1996 (age 30)
- Place of birth: Ashbourne, Ireland
- Height: 1.80 m (5 ft 11 in)
- Position: Centre-back

Team information
- Current team: Minera
- Number: 21

Youth career
- 2006–2012: Ashbourne United
- 2010–2012: Home Farm
- 2012–2015: Aston Villa

Senior career*
Years	Team	Apps	(Gls)
2015–2017	Aston Villa	4	(0)
2015	→ Kidderminster Harriers (loan)	6	(0)
2016–2017	→ Walsall (loan)	16	(0)
2017	→ Bradford City (loan)	2	(1)
2017	→ Stevenage (loan)	6	(0)
2018–2019	St Patrick's Athletic	56	(7)
2020–2024	La Nucía	92	(3)
2024–2025	Orihuela	27	(0)
2025–	Minera	16	(1)

International career^{‡}
2013–2015	Republic of Ireland U19	8	(1)
- * Club domestic league appearances and goals as of 19:31, 26 April 2026 (UTC) ‡ National team caps and goals as of 09:32, 7 March 2025 (UTC)

Kevin Stephen Toner (born 18 July 1996) is an Irish professional footballer who plays as a centre-back for Spanish Segunda Federación club Minera. Although he plays as a centre-back usually, Toner has also played at left-back. Toner is a product of the Aston Villa academy, having been signed as youngster from Home Farm. He spent time on loan from Aston Villa at Kidderminster Harriers, Walsall, Bradford City and Stevenage. He left Villa in 2018, spending two years with St Patrick's Athletic in the League of Ireland Premier Division. He then moved to Spain in 2020, spending four years with La Nucía and a season with Orihuela before moving to Minera in 2025.

== Club career ==
=== Aston Villa ===
Toner joined the Aston Villa academy in 2012 from Home Farm having earlier played for his hometown club Ashbourne United. Having progressed through the academy and the development squad, where he was captain, Toner signed a contract with the club in July 2015, ending all the transfer speculation.

On 23 April 2016, Toner made his senior début for already-relegated Aston Villa, coming on as a second-half substitute for Micah Richards in a Premier League match against Southampton. He made his first start for the Villans a week later in a 3–2 defeat to Watford. The club's caretaker Eric Black described his performance as "outstanding and deserves enormous credit, as he kept his head held high and he has performed at Premier League level."

==== Loan Spells ====
===== Kidderminster Harriers =====
On 18 September 2015, Toner was loaned to Kidderminster Harriers of the National League for one month. He made his senior debut the next day in a 2–0 loss to Lincoln City at Aggborough. Toner quickly established himself in the left-back position, making a total of six games (all starts) for the Worcestershire club before returning to his parent club in mid-October after suffering an injury. Following his loan spell at Kidderminster Harriers came to an end, Toner later paid tribute to the club, saying: "It was good. It was just different. It was nice to be out playing men's football and seeing what it was all about. It's all about getting points on the board and not so much just playing football – you have to make sure you win. That's the main part at the end of it all. But it was good to just go out and see. It's a lot more physical so you have to be able to step and show you're not just a kid – you're there as a man as well."

===== Walsall =====
On 26 August 2016, Toner signed a new two-year deal with the club, and immediately joined League One side Walsall on loan until January 2017. He made his Walsall debut the next day, starting the whole game, in a 3–3 draw against Bury. Since making his debut for the club, Toner quickly established himself in the starting eleven, playing in the centre-back position and was praised by his teammate, James O'Connor for his performance. This lasted until he was replaced by Matt Preston. As a result, his loan spell was not renewed and returned to his parent club.

===== Bradford City =====
Several weeks after leaving Walsall, Toner signed on loan for Bradford City on transfer deadline day, 31 January 2017, alongside Charlie Wyke, Jacob Hanson and Matt Penney. However, he appeared on the substitute bench in number of games, having behind a third-choice centre-back position behind Rory McArdle and Romain Vincelot. It wasn't until on 26 March 2017 when he scored on his debut for the club, in a 3–2 loss against Scunthorpe United. Toner made another appearance for the club in the last game of the season, playing in the left-back position, in a 1–1 draw against Rochdale. At the end of the 2016–17 season, he returned to his parent club.

===== Stevenage =====
On 24 August 2017, Toner signed for Stevenage on a season-long loan. Two days later, he made his Stevenage debut, coming on as a second-half substitute, in a 1–0 win over Barnet. He then made his first start on 29 August 2017, playing 90 minutes, in a 6–2 loss against Oxford United in the EFL Trophy Group-Stage campaign. However, he struggled in the first team at Stevenage and appeared as an unused substitute. Toner was sent-off on 28 October 2017 against Yeovil Town, just 11 minutes after coming on as a substitute after half-time, in a 3–2 loss; in which he served a three match ban. By the time of his departure, Toner made nine appearances for the club.

=== St Patrick's Athletic ===
It was announced on 20 December 2017 that Toner had left Villa and returned home to Ireland, signing a two-year contract with St Patrick's Athletic ahead of the 2018 season. Toner scored on his debut in a 3–1 win away to Bray Wanderers in the Leinster Senior Cup, heading home a Conan Byrne cross. Toner's league debut was an eventful one, with Pat's 2–0 down, he was on the receiving end of an elbow to the face from Cork City striker Graham Cummins after 26 minutes, which resulted in a red card that changed the game. Pat's got the game back to 2–2 before conceding direct from a corner and undeservedly losing to the champions. Toner's first league goal came on 5 April 2018 in a 5–0 win over Bray Wanderers at Richmond Park, he also made a goal line clearance with an incredible scorpion kick in the same game. Toner finished the season with 6 goals in 37 appearances, impressing fans with his aerial ability. 2019 saw the Saint's struggle with inconsistency in the league but Toner saw his first taste of European football when he played both legs of the club's UEFA Europa League tie against IFK Norrköping of Sweden, losing 2–0 at home and 2–1 away. Toner finished the season with 3 goals in 30 games in all competitions. Toner announced on 26 October 2019 via his Instagram account that he would be leaving the Saints after his contract had expired, amidst reports of a falling out with new manager Stephen O'Donnell.

=== La Nucía ===
On 24 November 2019, it was announced that Toner had signed for Leinster Senior League side Kilmore Celtic. After his very short spell of non league football in Ireland which ended before he made an appearance due Toner's job seeing him move to Spain, it was announced on 17 September 2020 that he had signed for Segunda División B side CF La Nucía. In January 2023, he featured against La Liga side Valencia CF in the Copa del Rey.

=== Orihuela ===
On 21 June 2024, Toner signed for fellow Segunda Federación side Orihuela CF for the 2024–25 season. He spent just one season at the club, making 29 appearances in all competitions.

=== Minera ===
In the summer of 2025, he moved to another Segunda Federación club, CD Minera.

== Personal life ==
Born in Ashbourne, County Meath, Ireland, His family comes from a sporting background: his uncle, Mark Dwyer, was a Gold Cup winning jockey; his father, Brendan, was a footballer for Mansfield Town; and his mother was a golfer, who plays "at a seven handicap". Toner said meeting Paul McGrath left him starstruck, having described him as "a total hero in Ireland".

== International career ==
Having previously represented U15 and U16 side, Toner scored on his Republic of Ireland U19 debut on 5 September 2013, in a 2–0 win over Slovenia U19. He went on to make eight appearances and scoring once for the Republic of Ireland U19 side.

In August 2016, Toner was called up by Republic of Ireland U21 squad. However, he appeared twice as an unused substitute, against Slovenia U21 and Serbia U21.

== Career statistics ==
As of match played on 26 April 2026

Appearances and goal by club, season and competition
Club	Season	League			National cup (Note: Includes FA Cup, FAI Cup & Copa del Rey)		League cup (Note: Includes EFL Cup, League of Ireland Cup & Copa Federación de España)		Europe		Other		Total	
Club	Season	Division	Apps	Goals	Apps	Goals	Apps	Goals	Apps	Goals	Apps	Goals	Apps	Goals
Aston Villa	2015–16	Premier League	4	0	0	0	0	0	—		—		4	0
Aston Villa	2016–17	EFL Championship	0	0	0	0	0	0	—		—		0	0
Aston Villa	Total		4	0	0	0	0	0	0	0	0	0	4	0
Kidderminster Harriers (loan)	2015–16	National League	6	0	0	0	—		—		0	0	6	0
Walsall (loan)	2016–17	EFL League One	16	0	1	0	0	0	—		3 (Note: Appearances in EFL Trophy)	0	20	0
Bradford City (loan)	2016–17	EFL League One	2	1	0	0	0	0	—		0	0	2	1
Stevenage (loan)	2017–18	EFL League Two	6	0	0	0	0	0	—		3	0	9	0
St Patrick's Athletic	2018	League of Ireland Premier Division	30	4	2	0	1	0	—		4 (Note: Appearances in Leinster Senior Cup)	2	37	6
St Patrick's Athletic	2019	League of Ireland Premier Division	26	3	1	0	0	0	2 (Note: Appearances in UEFA Europa League)	0	1	0	30	3
St Patrick's Athletic	Total		56	7	3	0	1	0	2	0	4	2	67	9
La Nucía	2020–21	Segunda División B	16	0	2	0	–		–		0	0	18	0
La Nucía	2021–22	Segunda Federación	32	1	0	0	–		–		0	0	32	1
La Nucía	2022–23	Primera Federación	27	1	3	0	–		–		0	0	30	1
La Nucía	2023–24	Segunda Federación	17	1	0	0	–		–		0	0	17	1
La Nucía	Total		92	3	5	0	0	0	0	0	0	0	97	3
Orihuela	2024–25	Segunda Federación	27	0	2	0	0	0	–		–		29	0
Minera	2025–26	Segunda Federación	16	1	0	0	1	0	–		–		17	1
Career total			226	12	11	0	2	0	2	0	10	2	248	14
