= Rónán Murray =

Irish musician (born 1977)

Rónán Murray (born 5 June 1977 in Dublin, Ireland) is an Irish organist. He attended Blackrock College, a school for boys in south Dublin, where he was chapel organist during his school days. He studied organ with Peter Sweeney at the Dublin Institute of Technology's Conservatory of Music and Drama. In November 1996 he became titular organist of St. Joseph's Church Glasthule, Dublin.
