= James Doona =

Irish professional association footballer

Personal information
- Date of birth: 15 January 1998 (age 28)
- Place of birth: Inchicore, Ireland
- Position: Winger

Team information
- Current team: Lucan United
- Number: 10

Youth career
- Lourdes Celtic
- Crumlin United
- Stella Maris
- St Patrick's Athletic
- 2015–2016: Shamrock Rovers

Senior career*
Years	Team	Apps	(Gls)
2015–2017	Shamrock Rovers	25	(4)
2018–2020	St Patrick's Athletic	39	(4)
2021	Athlone Town	25	(6)
2022	Cork City	15	(0)
2023	Longford Town	19	(0)
2024–2025	Glenavon	26	(5)
2025	→ Armagh City (loan)	13	(5)
2025	ROC Celtic	3	(2)
2026–	Lucan United	20	(9)

International career
2015	Republic of Ireland U18	5	(0)
- * Club domestic league appearances and goals as of 12:52, 6 October 2026

James Doona (born 15 January 1998) is an Irish professional footballer who currently plays for FAI National League club Lucan United.

== Club career ==
=== Youth career ===
Raised in School Street in The Liberties, Doona started playing football with Lourdes Celtic. His form there earned him moves to two of the country's top schoolboy clubs, Crumlin United and then Stella Maris. Doona's took his first step towards League of Ireland football by signing for Inchicore club St Patrick's Athletic's youth setup. In August 2015 Doona signed for Shamrock Rovers Under 19's squad, where he played for the 2015 short season and the also 2016 season with them.

=== Shamrock Rovers ===
==== 2015 & 2016 seasons ====
Doona's first involvement with the Shamrock Rovers first team was on 8 September 2015 when he played in their 1–0 Leinster Senior Cup. He made two more first team appearances for the first team that season, both in the Leinster Senior Cup, a semi final win over Bohemians, playing alongside Damien Duff as well as playing in the final as Rovers lost 3–1 to Dundalk. Doona's first league appearance in senior football came on 29 May 2016 when he came off the bench in a 1–1 draw with Finn Harps at the Tallaght Stadium. His first senior goal came on 19 August 2016 when he scored the fifth goal in a 5–0 away win over Athlone Town in the FAI Cup. In all, Doona played in 12 games in 2016, scoring one goal.

==== 2017 season ====
2017 saw Doona become a full member of the first team squad as he no longer had any involvement with the Under 19's. This allowed manager Stephen Bradley to use Doona a lot more and this saw him feature in 27 games, scoring 6 goals. He scored an important 120th-minute winner over Cork City in the semi-final of the League Cup and also played in the final as Rovers lost 3–0 to Dundalk. He was mainly used off the bench however as he started in just 4 of his 18 league appearances as well as being an unused substitute in all 4 of Rovers UEFA Europa League campaign as they played against Stjarnan of Iceland before being knocked out by FK Mladá Boleslav of the Czech Republic. In the off-season, Doona trained with Tranmere Rovers who were set to sign the 19 year old but a move never materialised.

=== St Patrick's Athletic ===
==== 2018 season ====
On 12 December 2017, it was announced that Doona had signed for his boyhood club from his native Inchicore, St Patrick's Athletic. The transfer was seen as a shock move among League of Ireland circles but upon signing, Doona spoke of how he lives only 2 minutes from Richmond Park as well as speaking about how he regularly attended games before starting his own career and has fond memories of Chris Forrester, Christy Fagan and Killian Brennan's performances on the way to the club's 2013 title win. He made his debut in a 3–1 Leinster Senior Cup win away to Bray Wanderers on 4 February 2018. Doona got his first assists for the Saints when he set up two goals for Michael Leahy in extra time of the Saints 4–4 League Cup draw with Dundalk at Richmond Park. Doona played the full 120 minutes and scored his penalty in the shootout as his side lost 8–7 on penalties. Doona struggled for game time under Liam Buckley but the manager left the club in September, with his assistant Ger O'Brien restoring Doona to the team towards the end of the season. On the last day of the season, Doona scored his first goals for the club as he scored twice in a 5–0 win over Derry City in front of the onlooking newly appointed Saints manager Harry Kenny. This display impressed Kenny enough to offer Doona a new contract for the 2019 season on 23 November 2018.

==== 2019 season ====
Doona's first goal of the season came in the League Cup, scoring in a 2–1 loss at home to Dundalk on 1 April 2019. On 22 October 2019 Doona came off the bench away to Derry City in the 77th minute and scored 2 goals within 5 minutes to give his side a 3–1 win, his first league goals of the season. This earned him his first start of the season, away to Champions Dundalk on the last day of the season. It was announced on 6 November 2019 that Doona had been released following the end of his contract. Doona played in two friendly games with the PFAI's out of contract squad, scoring in a 5–1 win over Rochdale XI and another in a 1–0 win over Home Farm.

==== 2020 season ====
On 8 January 2020, it was announced that Doona had signed a new one-year contract with St Patrick's Athletic, with manager Stephen O'Donnell changing his mind on Doona having originally allowed him to leave the club. Doona started the 2020 season off when he scored 2 goals in a 5–1 pre-season friendly win over Cobh Ramblers on 16 January 2020 and another against Galway United on 4 February. The season proved to be a difficult one for Doona, as the league season was halved due to the Coronavirus pandemic which also saw the League Cup and Leinster Senior Cup abandoned. As a result of this, Doona struggled for game time, playing in 8 of the club's 19 league and cup games, starting just 1 of them as his side finished in 6th place, missing out on European football on the final day of the season.

=== Athlone Town ===
Doona signed for League of Ireland First Division side Athlone Town on the 21st December 2020, ahead of the 2021 season. Doona made a total of 25 appearances for the club, scoring 6 goals as they finished in 7th place.

=== Cork City ===
On 6 November 2021, Doona signed for fellow League of Ireland First Division club Cork City ahead of the 2022 season. He made his debut for the club in a 6–0 win over Bray Wanderers at the Carlisle Grounds on 18 February 2022. Doona's first goal for the club came on 9 May 2022, when he scored a 25th-minute penalty in a 3–0 win away to Treaty United in the Munster Senior Cup Semi Final. Doona made 19 appearances in all competitions for the club, scoring 1 goal as they won the 2022 League of Ireland First Division, earning promotion To the Premier Division.

=== Longford Town ===
He signed for Longford Town of the League of Ireland First Division on 16 December 2022 for the 2023 season.

=== Glenavon ===
Following the expiry of his Longford Town contract, Doona signed for NIFL Premiership side Glenavon on 16 November 2023, being eligible to play from 1 January 2024. On 7 January 2024, he scored on his debut for the club, a 4–0 win over Knockbreda in the Irish Cup. His first league goal for the club came in a 2–2 draw with Linfield on 10 February 2024.

On 26 June 2025, it was announced that Doona would be leaving Glenavon upon the expiry of his contract.

==== Armagh City loan ====
On 3 February 2025, he was loaned out to NIFL Championship club Armagh City until the end of the season.

=== Lucan United ===
Having spent a very brief spell with Athletic Union League side ROC Celtic, Doona joined the Leinster Senior League Senior Division side Lucan United in September 2025. On 22 July 2026, he was announced as part of Lucan United's FAI National League side ahead of the league's inaugural season.

== International career ==
Doona made 2 appearances for the Republic of Ireland Under-18s on 28 and 30 November 2015, both against Czech Republic Under-18s.

== Career statistics ==
As of match played 3 October 2026

Appearances and goals by club, season and competition
Club	Division	Season	League		National Cup (Note: Includes FAI Cup & Irish Cup)		League Cup (Note: Includes League of Ireland Cup, Northern Ireland Football League Cup & Charlie Cahill Cup)		Europe		Other		Total	
Club	Division	Season	Apps	Goals	Apps	Goals	Apps	Goals	Apps	Goals	Apps	Goals	Apps	Goals
Shamrock Rovers	LOI Premier Division	2015	0	0	0	0	0	0	0 (Note: Appearances in UEFA Europa League)	0	3 (Note: Appearances in Leinster Senior Cup)	0	3	0
Shamrock Rovers	LOI Premier Division	2016	7	0	2	1	2	0	0	0	1	0	12	1
Shamrock Rovers	LOI Premier Division	2017	18	4	5	1	4	1	0	0	0	0	27	6
Shamrock Rovers	Total		25	4	7	2	6	1	0	0	4	0	42	7
St Patrick's Athletic	LOI Premier Division	2018	17	2	0	0	1	0	—		3	0	21	2
St Patrick's Athletic	LOI Premier Division	2019	15	2	0	0	1	1	0	0	2	0	18	3
St Patrick's Athletic	LOI Premier Division	2020	7	0	1	0	—		—		—		8	0
St Patrick's Athletic	Total		39	4	1	0	2	1	0	0	5	0	47	5
Athlone Town	LOI First Division	2021	25	6	0	0	—		—		—		25	6
Cork City	LOI First Division	2022	15	0	2	0	—		—		2 (Note: Appearances in Munster Senior Cup)	1	19	1
Longford Town	LOI First Division	2023	19	0	1	0	—		—		0	0	20	1
Glenavon	NIFL Premiership	2023–24	13	3	2	1	1	0	—		—		16	4
Glenavon	NIFL Premiership	2024–25	20	2	1	0	1	0	—		2 (Note: Appearances in Mid-Ulster Cup)	2	24	4
Glenavon	Total		33	5	3	1	2	0	—		2	2	40	8
Armagh City (loan)	NIFL Championship	2024–25	13	5	—		—		—		—		13	5
ROC Celtic	Athletic Union League	2025–26	3	2	—		—		—		—		3	2
Lucan United	Leinster Senior League Senior Division	2025–26	16	9	0	0	4	1	—		4 (Note: Appearances in Metropolitan Cup)	1	24	11
Lucan United	FAI National League	2026	4	0	—		—		—		—		4	0
Lucan United	Total		20	9	0	0	4	1	—		4	1	28	11
Career Total			193	35	14	3	14	3	0	0	17	5	237	46

== Honours ==
St Patrick's Athletic

- Leinster Senior Cup: 2019

Cork City

- League of Ireland First Division: 2022
