= Martin Russell =

Irish footballer and manager (born 1967)

Personal information
- Full name: Martin Christopher Russell
- Date of birth: 27 April 1967 (age 59)
- Place of birth: Dublin, Ireland
- Height: 5 ft 9 in (1.75 m)
- Position: Midfielder

Youth career
- Belvedere
- 1982–1984: Manchester United

Senior career*
| Years | Team | Apps | (Gls) |
| 1984–1987 | Manchester United | 0 | (0) |
| 1986 | → Birmingham City (loan) | 5 | (0) |
| 1987 | → Norwich City (loan) | 0 | (0) |
| 1987–1989 | Leicester City | 20 | (0) |
| 1989–1990 | Scarborough | 51 | (9) |
| 1990–1991 | Middlesbrough | 11 | (2) |
| 1991–1998 | Portadown | 160 | (26) |
| 1998–2003 | St Patrick's Athletic | 140 | (19) |
| Total | | 387 | (56) |

International career
| 1986–1987 | Republic of Ireland U21 | 4 | (0) |
| 1992 | Republic of Ireland B | 1 | (0) |

Managerial career
- 2003–2005: St Patrick's Athletic (assistant manager)
- 2006–2008: UCD (assistant manager)
- 2009–2013: UCD
- 2014: St Patrick's Athletic (assistant manager)
- 2014–2017: Limerick
- 2018: Bray Wanderers
- 2021–2022: Athlone Town
- 2026: Newbridge Town
- * Club domestic league appearances and goals

Martin Christopher Russell (born 27 April 1967) is an Irish former professional footballer and manager. As a player, he played in the English Football League for Birmingham City, Leicester City, Scarborough and Middlesbrough. He also played for Portadown in the Irish Football League and for St Patrick's Athletic in the League of Ireland.

He managed UCD for five seasons, winning the League of Ireland First Division in 2009. He was the assistant manager of St Patrick's Athletic in 2014 from January until July when he took over as manager of Limerick He left Limerick by mutual consent in April 2017. In 2018 he spent a short time as manager of Bray Wanderers before departing the club a month later due to the club's financial turmoil. In 2022 he managed Athlone Town for 8 games.

He played for the Republic of Ireland national football team at the 1984 UEFA European Under-18 Football Championship and the 1985 FIFA World Youth Championship. He won four caps for the Republic of Ireland under-21 team.

== Playing career ==
Russell was a midfielder and he began his football career with Belvedere, and joined Manchester United from school. He spent time on loan to Birmingham City, where he made his Football League debut in 1986, and Norwich City, but left United in 1987 without having played for the first team. He went on to play for Leicester City, Scarborough and Middlesbrough before returning to Ireland. He played for Portadown from 1991 to 1998, and in 1992 won the Northern Ireland PFA Player of the Year award. In 1998, he returned to Dublin where he played for St Patrick's Athletic, and was appointed assistant manager in 2003.

== Management career ==
Russell's first experience in coaching came with St Patrick's Athletic as an assistant manager. Two years later he joined UCD AFC, initially as first-team coach, then assistant manager, and was appointed manager in January 2009. He won the League of Ireland First Division title in his first year as manager gaining promotion to the Premier Division. He kept UCD up in that division for four more seasons before leaving the club. He gave his son Sean his League of Ireland debut in September 2010.

Russell was appointed by his old club St Patrick's Athletic as assistant manager to his former Pats manager Liam Buckley on 24 February 2014.

=== Limerick FC ===
In July 2014, he left St Patrick's Athletic to become the manager of struggling Premier Division side Limerick FC, who had fired manager Stuart Taylor. Russell successfully kept the club in the Premier Division, but Limerick were relegated the following season, losing a playoff 2–1 on aggregate to Finn Harps. Tasked with bringing the club straight back to the top flight, Russell guided Limerick to the first Division title in record time, as well as reaching the final of the EA Sports League Cup, which they lost to his old club St Patrick's Athletic.

Following a poor start to the 2017 season culminating in a 0–3 home defeat by Cork City, he left Limerick by mutual consent on 3 April 2017.

=== Bray Wanderers ===
In April 2018, Russell was appointed by Bray Wanderers in an advisory role to caretaker manager Graham Kelly. On 8 June, Russell was appointed as first team manager at Bray after Kelly's caretaker role reached the maximum 60 day mark. However, Russell resigned on 18 July amid financial turmoil at the club.

=== Athlone Town ===
On 9 November 2021, Russell was appointed as manager of League of Ireland First Division club Athlone Town. After going winless in the 2022 campaign, drawing one and losing seven, Russell and Athlone parted ways by mutual agreement on 10 April 2022.

== Managerial statistics ==
As of 21 April 2022

| Team | From | To | Record | | | | |
| Team | From | To | G | W | D | L | Win % |
|---|---|---|---|---|---|---|---|
| Limerick | 6 July 2014 | 3 April 2017 | 93 | 46 | 12 | 35 | 49.46 |
| Bray Wanderers | 8 June 2018 | 18 July 2018 | 2 | 0 | 0 | 2 | 0.00 |
| Athlone Town | 9 November 2021 | 10 April 2022 | 8 | 0 | 1 | 7 | 0.00 |
| Total | | | 103 | 46 | 13 | 44 | 44.66 |

== Honours ==
=== As a player ===
Portadown

- Irish League (1): 1995–96
- Irish League Cup (1): 1995–96

St Patrick's Athletic

- League of Ireland (1): 1998–99
- Leinster Senior Cup (1): 1999–2000

=== As a manager ===
UCD

- League of Ireland First Division (1): 2009

St Patrick's Athletic (assistant)

- FAI President's Cup (1): 2014

== Sources ==
UCD programme v Limerick 6 March 2009
