= Marco Tagbajumi =

Nigerian-Italian footballer

Personal information
- Full name: Marco Tagbajumi
- Date of birth: 1 July 1988 (age 38)
- Place of birth: Port Harcourt, Nigeria
- Height: 1.87 m (6 ft 1 1/2 in)
- Position: Forward

Team information
- Current team: Notodden
- Number: 33

Youth career
- 2007–2008: Skeid

Senior career*
Years	Team	Apps	(Gls)
2008–2009	Kingsbury London Tigers	10	(13)
2009–2011	AD Camacha	32	(3)
2011–2012	Akritas Chlorakas	24	(5)
2012–2013	APEP	22	(12)
2013–2014	Ermis Aradippou	32	(17)
2014–2015	AEL Limassol	24	(8)
2015	→ Strømsgodset (loan)	10	(4)
2016	Nakhon Ratchasima	29	(9)
2017–2018	Strømsgodset	13	(3)
2017	→ Lillestrøm (loan)	12	(0)
2018	Dundalk	16	(2)
2018	Bodø/Glimt	4	(0)
2019	Najran	0	(0)
2019–2020	Notodden	10	(3)
- * Club domestic league appearances and goals as of 27 October 2019

Marco Tagbajumi (born 1 July 1988) is a Nigerian-Italian former professional footballer.

== Personal life ==
Tagbajumi was born in Nigeria, but also holds an Italian passport. His family moved to Norway when he was 5, and he played youth football for Skeid.

== Club career ==
After moving to London, England with his family in 2008, Tagbajumi started playing non-league football for Kingsbury London Tigers. In 2009, he signed for AD Camacha in Portugal, and spent two seasons at the club before moving to Cyprus.

=== Strømsgodset ===
On 18 August 2015, Tagbajumi signed a loan deal with Strømsgodset for the remainder of the 2015 season. Strømsgodset secured an option to buy the player.

He played his first match for Strømsgodset when he came on as a substitute in the 82nd minute in the 4–2 win against local rivals Mjøndalen IF. A week later, he scored his first two goals for the club in his home debut, a 5–0 win against FK Haugesund on 11 September 2015.

After the 2015 season, Strømsgodset decided not to use the option to buy the player.

On 11 November 2016, Tagbajumi signed a one-year contract with Strømsgodset.

== Honours ==
=== Club ===
Lillestrøm

- Norwegian Football Cup (1): 2017
