= 2021 Shelbourne F.C. season =

Shelbourne
2021 season
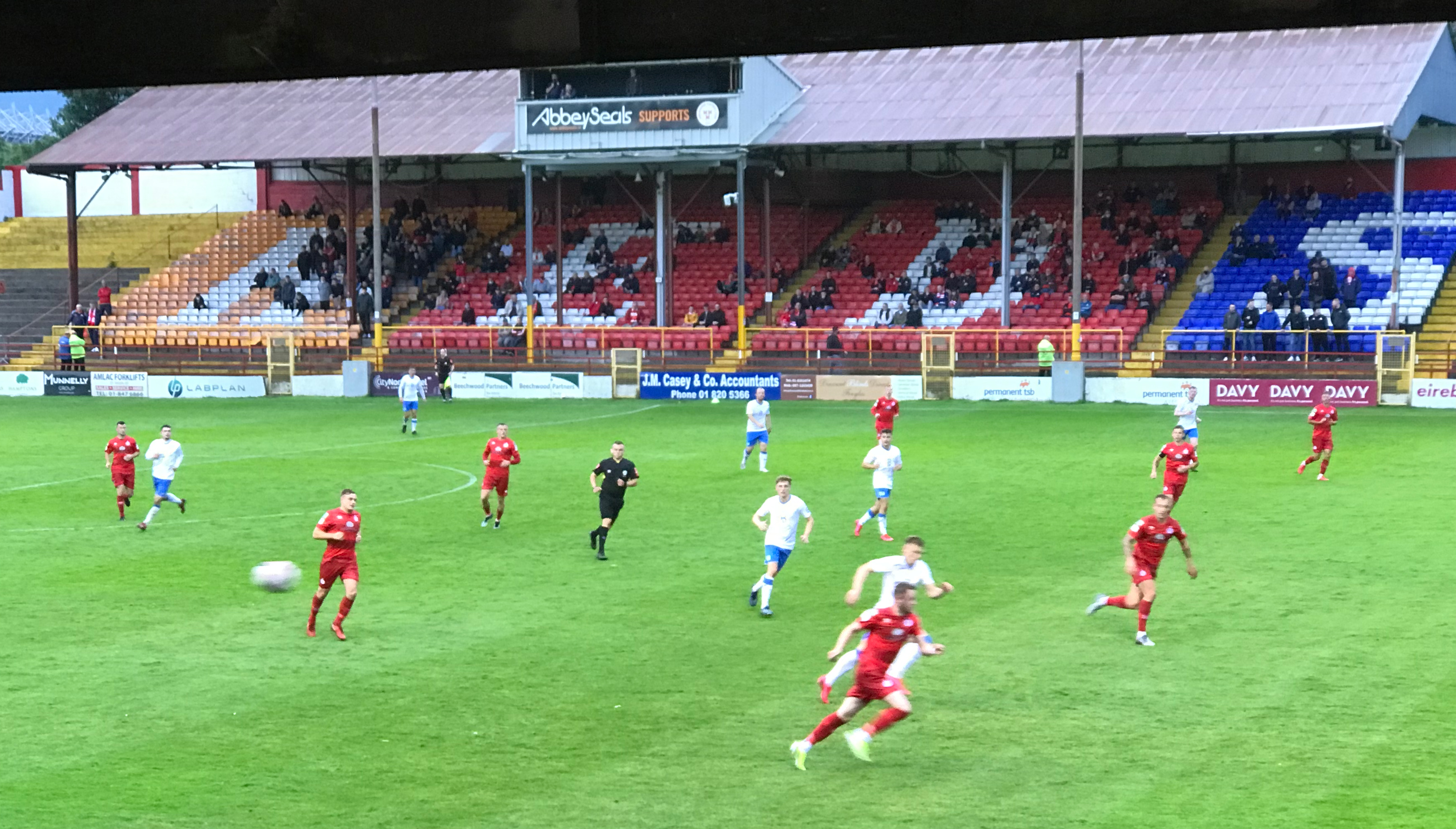
- Chairman: Andrew Doyle
- Head Coach: Ian Morris
- Stadium: Tolka Park, Dublin
- League of Ireland First Division: 1st (promoted)
- FAI Cup: 1st Round
- Top goalscorer: League: Ryan Brennan (15); All: Ryan Brennan (15)
Home colours	Away colours
- All statistics correct as of 21:00 01 November 2021 (UTC).

The 2021 Shelbourne F.C. season was the club's 126th season in existence and their first back in the League of Ireland First Division following relegation from the League of Ireland Premier Division at the end of 2020. Shelbourne won the First Division title and promotion to the Premier Division following a 1–0 win over Treaty United on 1 October 2021. Shelbourne competed in the FAI Cup, but the League of Ireland Cup was cancelled due to the Coronavirus pandemic.

== Overview ==
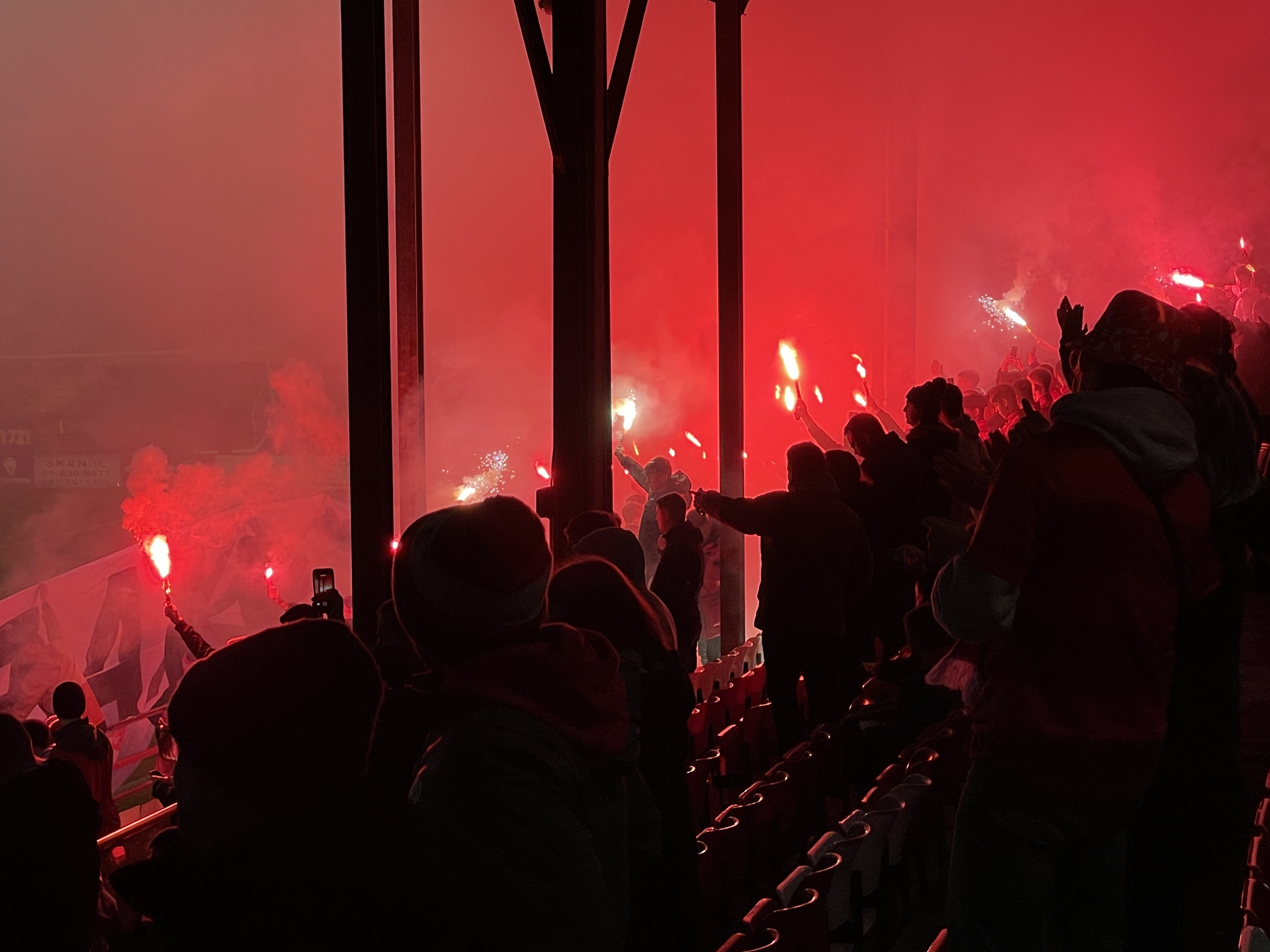
Fans at Tolka Park

Shelbourne began the 2021 season with a 0–0 draw away to Galway United; Georgie Poynton, Sean Quinn and Ryan Brennan were the only surviving members of the 2020 squad in the starting eleven, with ex-Cork City defender Kevin O'Connor standing in as captain. New signing Glen McAuley received a red card in the 41st minute for a dangerous challenge on Maurice Nugent in a game which saw 9 players make their Shels debuts. Following a 3–3 draw with Bray Wanderers, Shels picked up their first win of the season at home to Wexford, an own goal by Conor Crowley settling the tie. Shelbourne won 11 out of the next 14 games and club captain Luke Byrne returned to the starting line up for the 1–0 win at home to Athlone Town on 7 May 2021. The Reds topped the league table the following week after their 2–1 win away to Cobh Ramblers, and stayed there unopposed for the rest of the season.

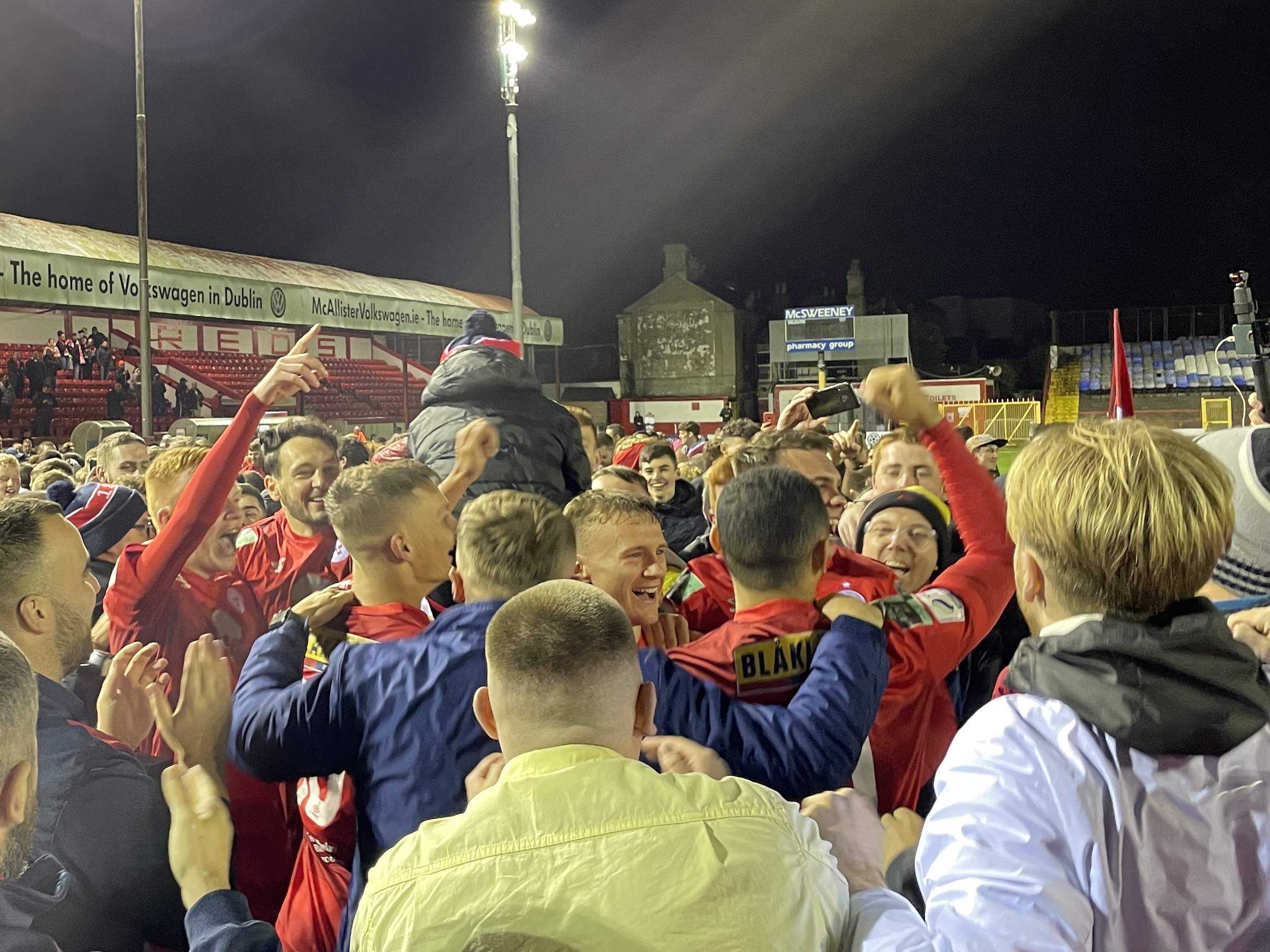
Shelbourne players celebrate with fans after securing promotion

Fans returned to Tolka Park for the first time since the start of the COVID-19 pandemic on 25 June 2021, with 100 supporters allowed in for the visit of Cork City. The 2–1 win gave Shelbourne an 11-point lead at the top of the league table. Sean Quinn and Glen McAuley departed the club in July, while Eric Molloy, Kameron Ledwidge and Yassine En-Neyah arrived as Shelbourne looked to strengthen their squad ahead of the final ten games. Molloy made his debut as a substitute as Shels exited the FAI Cup in the first round via a 0–2 defeat away to UCD Due to squad absences a much changed team lined up against UCD in the league on 7 August 2021, with Under-19's goalkeeper Jack McCarthy making his debut and keeping a clean sheet after Brendan Clarke and Jack Brady were unavailable for selection. Shelbourne suffered their first defeat of the season away to Galway United the following week, but would only lose one other game during the remainder of the season.

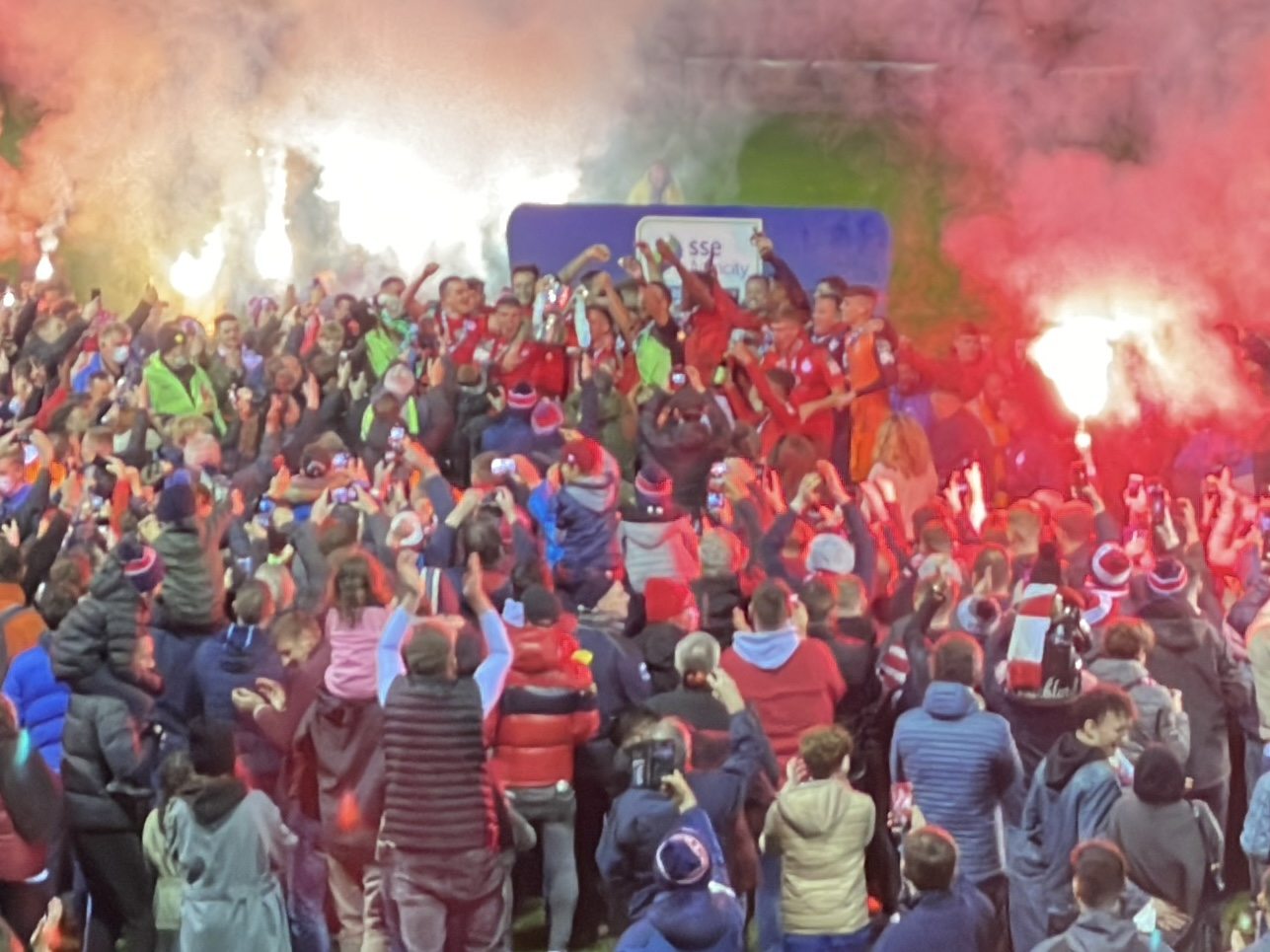
First Division Trophy presentation at Tolka Park

The next four games saw Shelbourne draw at home to Bray Wanderers, win at home against Wexford, and win away to Cobh and Cabinteely. A win at home to Treaty United on 1 October 2021 would see Shelbourne secure promotion, and Georgie Poynton's 74th minute spot kick secured the 1–0 victory. At the final whistle fans burst onto the Tolka Park pitch to celebrate the return to the Premier Division with players and staff. The next two games saw a 1–1 draw at home to Athlone Town and a 0–2 defeat away to Cobh.

Manager Ian Morris announced his departure from the managers position on 25 October 2021, effective the end of the season. The final game of the season saw UCD visit Tolka Park on 29 October 2021. Despite early pressure from Shelbourne, UCD went ahead through Evan Caffrey early in the second half. Ex-UCD striker Yoyo Mahdy replaced Brian McManus late on and scored an equaliser in the 88th minute to preserve Shels unbeaten home record for the 2021 season. Following the final whistle fans were invited onto the pitch to see the team presented with the First Division Trophy.

Damien Duff was announced as manager for the 2022 season on 3 November 2021.

== First team squad ==
Players' ages are as of the opening day of the 2021 season.

#	Name	Nationality	Position	Date of birth (age)	Previous club	Signed in	Notes
Goalkeepers
1	Brendan Clarke	(Republic of Ireland)	GK	17 September 1985 (aged 35)	St Patricks Athletic	2021	
25	Jack Brady	(Republic of Ireland)	GK	17 December 1996 (aged 24)	Limerick F.C.	2019	
55	Jack McCarthy	(Republic of Ireland)	GK	Unknown (aged 17)	Drogheda United F.C.	2021	
Defenders
2	Michael Barker	(Republic of Ireland)	DF	16 August 1993 (aged 27)	Bohemians	2021	
3	Kevin O'Connor	(Republic of Ireland)	DF	7 May 1995 (aged 25)	Cork City	2021	
4	Ally Gilchrist	(Scotland)	DF	5 March 1995 (aged 26)	Derry City	2021	
15	Maxim Kouogun	(Cameroon)	DF	14 March 1997 (aged 24)	Wealdstone	2021	
16	John Ross Wilson	(Republic of Ireland)	DF	13 December 1998 (aged 22)	Bray Wanderers	2021	
23	Luke Byrne (c)	(Republic of Ireland)	DF	8 July 1993 (aged 27)	Shamrock Rovers	2019	
24	David Toure	(Republic of Ireland)	DF/MF	1 October 2004 (aged 16)	Trainee	2021	
28	Stephen Negru	(Republic of Ireland)	DF	Unknown	Trainee	2021	
32	Kameron Ledwidge	(Republic of Ireland)	DF	7 April 2001 (aged 19)	Southampton	2021	
Midfielders
5	Yassine En-Neyah	(Republic of Ireland)	MF	10 June 2000 (aged 20)	Nottingham Forest	2021	
6	Jonathan Lunney	(Republic of Ireland)	MF	2 February 1998 (aged 23)	Bohemians	2021	
7	Eric Molloy	(Republic of Ireland)	MF	12 December 1992 (aged 28)	Waterford F.C.	2019	
8	Gerardo Bruna	(Argentina)	MF	29 January 1991 (aged 30)	Derry City	2021	
10	Ryan Brennan	(Republic of Ireland)	MF	11 November 1991 (aged 29)	St Patricks Athletic	2019	
12	Denzil Fernandes	(Republic of Ireland)	MF	21 February 1998 (aged 23)	Cobh Ramblers	2019	
14	Brian McManus	(Republic of Ireland)	MF	29 November 2001 (aged 19)	Preston North End	2020	
17	Shane Farrell	(Republic of Ireland)	MF	26 June 2000 (aged 20)	Finglas United	2018	
18	Dayle Rooney	(Republic of Ireland)	MF	24 February 1998 (aged 23)	St Kevin's	2015	
19	Gavin Molloy	(Republic of Ireland)	MF	19 October 2001 (aged 19)	Bohemians	2020	
20	Kyle O'Connor	(Republic of Ireland)	MF	14 March 2003 (aged 18)	Trainee	2021	
26	Georgie Poynton	(Republic of Ireland)	MF	8 September 1997 (aged 23)	Waterford F.C.	2019	
30	Alex Nolan	(Republic of Ireland)	MF	20 March 2003 (aged 18)	Shamrock Rovers	2019	
Attackers
9	Michael O'Connor	(Republic of Ireland)	FW	31 July 1998 (aged 22)	Ross County	2021	
11	Yousef Mahdy	(Republic of Ireland)	FW	20 January 1998 (aged 23)	UCD	2021	
21	Alex Cetiner	(Republic of Ireland)	FW	20 July 2001 (aged 19)	Trainee	2020	
65	Stanley Anaebonam	(Republic of Ireland)	FW	14 April 1999 (aged 21)	Unattached	2021	
Players who left the club mid-season
	Alex O'Hanlon	(Republic of Ireland)	DF	24 April 1996 (aged 24)	Glentoran	2018	St Mochta's
~~7~~	Glen McAuley	(Republic of Ireland)	FW	24 February 2000 (aged 21)	Bohemians	2021	Athlone Town
~~19~~	Sean Quinn	(Republic of Ireland)	MF	5 February 1999 (aged 22)	UCD	2018	Released

== Coaching staff ==
Position	Staff
Head coach	Ian Morris
Assistant Coach	Alan Reynolds
1st Team Coach	David McAllister
Goalkeeping Coach	Paul Skinner

== Transfers ==
=== Transfers in ===
Date	Position	Nationality	Name	Previous club	Fee	Ref.
1 January 2021	GK	(Republic of Ireland)	Brendan Clarke	(Republic of Ireland) St Patrick's	Free	
1 January 2021	DF	(Republic of Ireland)	Michael Barker	(Republic of Ireland) Bohemians	Free	
1 January 2021	DF	(Republic of Ireland)	John Ross Wilson	(Republic of Ireland) Bray Wanderers	Free	
1 January 2021	MF	(Republic of Ireland)	Jonathan Lunney	(Republic of Ireland) Bohemians	Free	
1 January 2021	FW	(Republic of Ireland)	Glen McAuley	(Republic of Ireland) Bohemians	Free	
1 January 2021	DF	(Scotland)	Ally Gilchrist	(Republic of Ireland) Derry City	Free	
1 January 2021	FW	(Republic of Ireland)	Michael O'Connor	(Scotland) Ross County	Free	
1 January 2021	DF	(Republic of Ireland)	Kevin O'Connor	(Republic of Ireland) Cork City	Free	
8 January 2021	FW	(Republic of Ireland)	Yoyo Mahdy	(Republic of Ireland) UCD	Free	
3 February 2021	MF	(Argentina)	Gerardo Bruna	(Republic of Ireland) Derry City	Free	
18 February 2021	DF	(Cameroon)	Maxim Kouogun	(England) Wealdstone	Free	
22 July 2021	MF	(Republic of Ireland)	Eric Molloy	(England) Waterford	Unknown	
30 July 2021	MF	(Republic of Ireland)	Yassine En-Neyah	(England) Nottingham Forest	Unknown	
30 July 2021	DF	(Republic of Ireland)	Kameron Ledgewidge	(England) Southampton	Unknown	
4 September 2021	FW	(Republic of Ireland)	Stanley Anaebonam	Unattached	Unknown	

=== Transfers out ===
Date	Position	Nationality	Name	To	Fee	Ref.
31 December 2020	GK	(Republic of Ireland)	Colin McCabe	(Republic of Ireland) Drogheda United	Unknown	
31 December 2020	DF	(Republic of Ireland)	Daniel Byrne	(Northern Ireland) Warrenpoint Town	Unknown	
31 December 2020	DF	(Republic of Ireland)	Aidan Friel	(Republic of Ireland) Athlone Town	Unknown	
31 December 2020	MF	(Republic of Ireland)	Oscar Brennan	(Republic of Ireland) Waterford United	Unknown	
31 December 2020	MF	(Republic of Ireland)	Mark Byrne	(Republic of Ireland) Bray Wanderers	Unknown	
31 December 2020	MF	(Republic of Ireland)	Gary Deegan	(Republic of Ireland) Drogheda United	Unknown	
31 December 2020	MF	(Republic of Ireland)	Karl Moore	Unattached	Released	
31 December 2020	FW	(Republic of Ireland)	Aaron Dobbs	(Republic of Ireland) Longford Town	Unknown	
31 December 2020	FW	(Republic of Ireland)	Jaze Kabia	(Scotland) Livingstone	Unknown	
31 December 2020	FW	(Republic of Ireland)	Ciarán Kilduff	Unattached	Released	
31 December 2020	FW	(Republic of Ireland)	Karl Sheppard	Retired	Released	
1 July 2021	DF	(Republic of Ireland)	Alex O'Hanlon	St Mochta's	Released	
5 July 2021	MF	(Republic of Ireland)	Sean Quinn	Unattached	Released	
23 July 2021	FW	(Republic of Ireland)	Glen McAuley	(Republic of Ireland) Athlone Town	Unknown	

=== Loans out ===
Date	Position	Nationality	Name	From	Date until	Ref.
26 February 2021	DF	(Republic of Ireland)	Alex O'Hanlon	(Republic of Ireland) Wexford	30 June 2021	

== Competitions ==
=== Overview ===
Competition	First match	Last match	Starting round	Record							
Competition	First match	Last match	Starting round	Pld	W	D	L	GF	GA	GD	Win %
First Division	26 March 2021	29 October 2021	Matchday 1	27	16	9	2	49	23	+26	59.26
FAI Cup	23 July 2021	23 July 2021	First round	1	0	0	1	0	2	−2	0.00
Total				28	16	9	3	49	25	+24	57.14

Last updated: 29 October 2021
Source: Soccerway

=== League of Ireland ===
Pos	Team	Pld	W	D	L	GF	GA	GD	Pts	Qualification
1	Shelbourne (C, P)	27	16	9	2	49	23	+26	57	Promotion to League of Ireland Premier Division
2	Galway United	27	15	6	6	39	25	+14	51	Qualification to Promotion play-offs
3	UCD	27	13	7	7	55	38	+17	46	Qualification to Promotion play-offs
4	Treaty United	27	11	9	7	36	27	+9	42	Qualification to Promotion play-offs
5	Bray Wanderers	27	9	10	8	36	31	+5	37	Qualification to Promotion play-offs
6	Cork City	27	8	9	10	37	28	+9	33	
7	Athlone Town	27	9	6	12	32	43	−11	33	
8	Cobh Ramblers	27	8	4	15	25	46	−21	28	
9	Cabinteely	27	8	1	18	26	47	−21	25	
10	Wexford	27	6	3	18	29	56	−27	21	

Updated to match(es) played on 29 October 2021. Source: sseairtricityleague, Soccerway
Rules for classification: 1) Points; 2) Goal difference; 3) Goals scored
(C) Champions; (P) Promoted

==== Results summary ====
Overall								Home						Away					
Pld	W	D	L	GF	GA	GD	Pts	W	D	L	GF	GA	GD	W	D	L	GF	GA	GD
27	16	9	2	49	23	+26	57	8	6	0	27	12	+15	8	3	2	22	11	+11

Last updated: 29 October 2021.

==== Results by matchday ====
Matchday	1	2	3	4	5	6	7	8	9	10	11	12	13	14	15	16	17	18	19	20	21	22	23	24	25	26	27
Ground	A	H	H	A	A	H	H	A	H	H	A	A	H	H	A	A	H	A	A	H	H	A	A	H	H	A	H
Result	D	D	W	W	W	D	W	W	W	W	W	W	W	W	D	W	D	D	L	D	W	W	W	W	D	L	D
Position	5	6	4	3	2	3	2	1	1	1	1	1	1	1	1	1	1	1	1	1	1	1	1	1	1	1	1

Updated to match(es) played on 29 October 2021. Source: extratime.ie
A = Away; H = Home; W = Win; D = Draw; L = Loss

==== Matches ====
26 March 2021 1	Galway United	0–0	Shelbourne	Terryland, Galway
19:45 IST	Duggan (yellow card) 13'; Rowe (yellow card) 30'; Walsh (yellow card) 41'	Report; Highlights	Brennan (yellow card) 24'; McAuley (red card) 41'; Kouogun (yellow card) 41'; M.O'Connor (yellow card) 86'	Stadium: Eamonn Deacy Park; Attendance: 0 Referee: Eoghan O'Shea

2 April 2021 2	Shelbourne	3–3	Bray Wanderers	Drumcondra, Dublin
19:45 IST	Poynton 14', 77'; Brennan 26'; Fernandes (yellow card) 83'	Report; Highlights	Kavanagh 23', 56'; Graydon 51'	Stadium: Tolka Park; Attendance: 0 Referee: David Keeler

9 April 2021 3	Shelbourne	1–0	Wexford	Drumcondra, Dublin
19:45 IST	Crowley 61' (o.g.); M.O'Connor (yellow card) 65'	Report; Highlights		Stadium: Tolka Park; Attendance: 0 Referee: Gavin Colfer

16 April 2021 4	Cork City	1–3	Shelbourne	Turners Cross, Cork
19:45 IST	McGlade 7' (yellow card) 81'; Byrne (yellow card) 25'; Walsh (red card) 32'	Report; Highlights	Gilchrist 20'; Farrell 47'; M.O'Connor (yellow card) 56'; Mahdy 90' (pen.)	Stadium: Turners Cross; Attendance: 0 Referee: Marc Lynch

23 April 2021 5	Cabinteely	1–3	Shelbourne	Blackrock, Dublin
19:45 IST	Casey (yellow card) 22'; Knight (yellow card) 44'; McPhillips (yellow card) 59'; Campion 83'; McWilliams (yellow card) 90'	Report; Highlights	McManus (yellow card) 21'; M.O'Connor 25' (pen.); Farrell 39'; K.O'Connor (yellow card) 45' (goal) 68'; Lunney (yellow card) 87'	Stadium: Stradbrook Road; Attendance: 0 Referee: Alan Patchell

30 April 2021 6	Shelbourne	2–2	Treaty United	Drumcondra, Dublin
19:45 IST	M.O'Connor (yellow card) 73'; Brennan 90'; Mahdy 90+4'	Report; Highlights	Keane (yellow card) 11'; Walsh (yellow card) 29'; Hanlon 37'; O'Donnell (yellow card) 50' (yellow-red card) 90+3'; O'Connell (yellow card) 90+1' (goal) 90+6'	Stadium: Tolka Park; Attendance: 0 Referee: Oliver Moran

7 May 2021 7	Shelbourne	1–0	Athlone Town	Drumcondra, Dublin
19:45 IST	Brennan 55'	Report; Highlights	Daly (yellow card) 8'; Barnes (yellow card) 35'; Hollywood (yellow card) 41'	Stadium: Tolka Park; Attendance: 0 Referee: David Dunne

15 May 2021 8	Cobh Ramblers	1–2	Shelbourne	Cobh, Cork
19:00 IST	Drinan 16'; C.Murphy (yellow card) 44'	Report; Highlights	Gilchrist (yellow card) 33'; Wilson 63'; Brennan 80'	Stadium: St Colman's Park; Attendance: 0 Referee: John McLoughlin

21 May 2021 9	Shelbourne	3–1	UCD	Drumcondra, Dublin
19:45 IST	Farrell (yellow card) 5'; Wilson 22'; Brennan 24', 44'; Poynton (yellow card) 73'	Report; Highlights	Weir (yellow card) 29'; O'Brien 41'; Dignam (yellow card) 45+1'; Todd (yellow card) 52'; Ozam (yellow card) 75'	Stadium: Tolka Park; Attendance: 0 Referee: Gavin Colfer

28 May 2021 10	Shelbourne	4–0	Galway United	Drumcondra, Dublin
19:45 IST	M O'Connor 25'; Brennan 41'; Farrell (yellow card) 50'; Mahdy 51'; McAuley 81'	Report; Highlights	Nugent (yellow card) 28'; Hurley (yellow card) 47'; McCormack (yellow card) 69'; Rowe (yellow card) 78'; Ubaezuonu (yellow card) 87'	Stadium: Tolka Park; Attendance: 0 Referee: Eoghan O'Shea

11 June 2021 11	Bray Wanderers	1-4	Shelbourne	Bray, County Wicklow
19:30 IST	Barry (yellow card) 8'; Clifford 16'; Craven (yellow card) 68'; Graydon (yellow card) 71'	Report; Highlights	M O'Connor 11' (pen.); Brennan 39', 64'; Gilchrist 87'	Stadium: Carlisle Grounds; Attendance: 0 Referee: Alan Patchell

17 June 2021 12	Wexford	0-1	Shelbourne	Crossabeg, County Wexford
19:45 IST	Fitzgerald (yellow card) 30'; Crowley (yellow card) 45'; Robinson (yellow card) 80'	Report; Highlights	Poynton 32' (pen.)	Stadium: Ferrycarrig Park; Attendance: 0 Referee: David Keeler

25 June 2021 13	Shelbourne	2-1	Cork City	Drumcondra, Dublin
19:45 IST	M O'Connor 36'; Brennan 56'	Report; Highlights	Beattie (yellow card) 10'; Murphy 49'; McGlade (yellow card) 81'	Stadium: Tolka Park; Attendance: 100; Referee: David Dunne

2 July 2021 14	Shelbourne	1-0	Cabinteely	Drumcondra, Dublin
19:45 IST	M O'Connor (yellow card) 22'; Lunney (yellow card) 85'; Aspil 90' (o.g.)	Report; Highlights	Labutis (yellow card) 6'	Stadium: Tolka Park; Attendance: 100; Referee: Oliver Moran

9 July 2021 15	Treaty United	1-1	Shelbourne	Garryowen, Limerick
19:45 IST	Ludden (yellow card) 63'; Armshaw 90+3'	Report; Highlights	M O'Connor 68'; Rooney (yellow card) 90+2'	Stadium: Markets Field; Attendance: Unknown; Referee: Alan Patchell

16 July 2021 16	Athlone Town	1-3	Shelbourne	Lissywollen, Athlone
19:45 IST	Meaney 5'; Byrne (yellow card) 45'; McKenna (yellow card) 46'; Brookes (yellow card) 61'	Report; Highlights	Farrell 23'; Rooney 45', 87'	Stadium: Athlone Town Stadium; Attendance: 200; Referee: Michael Connolly

30 July 2021 17	Shelbourne	2-2	Cobh Ramblers	Drumcondra, Dublin
19:45 IST	M O'Connor 10'; Rooney 44'; M O'Connor (yellow card) 64'	Report; Highlights	Phillips (yellow card) 23'; D.O'Connell 28'; N.O'Connell 62'; Murphy (yellow card) 79'	Stadium: Tolka Park; Attendance: Unknown; Referee: Kevin O'Sullivan

6 August 2021 18	UCD	0-0	Shelbourne	Belfield, Dublin
19:45 IST	Weir (yellow card) 15'; Farrell (yellow card) 90+3'	Report; Highlights	Barker (yellow card) 17'; M O'Connor (yellow card) 37'	Stadium: UCD Bowl; Attendance: Unknown; Referee: Gavin Colfer

13 August 2021 19	Galway United	3-1	Shelbourne	Terryland, Galway
19:45 IST	Doherty 11'; Rowe (yellow card) 43'; Brouder 50'; McCormack (yellow card) 59'; Nugent (yellow card) 61'; Walsh (yellow card) 68'; Keating 89'	Report; Highlights	Brennan (yellow card) 45'; Farrell (yellow card) 76'; McManus 90'	Stadium: Eamonn Deacy Park; Attendance: Unknown; Referee: Alan Patchell

20 August 2021 20	Shelbourne	1-1	Bray Wanderers	Drumcondra, Dublin
19:45 IST	Brennan 44'	Report; Highlights	O'Farrell (yellow card) 20' (goal) 68'; Clifford (yellow card) 56'; Barnett (yellow card) 78'	Stadium: Tolka Park; Attendance: Unknown; Referee: Mark Moynihan

3 September 2021 21	Shelbourne	4-0	Wexford	Drumcondra, Dublin
19:45 IST	Brennan 8', 13'; En Neyah 23'; Gilchrist 57'	Report; Highlights	Fox (red card) 11'	Stadium: Tolka Park; Attendance: Unknown; Referee: Jason Mannix

10 September 2021 22	Cork City	0-2	Shelbourne	Turners Cross, Cork
19:45 IST	Byrne (yellow card) 11'; Crowley (yellow card) 9'	Report; Highlights	Brennan 15', 50'	Stadium: Turners Cross; Attendance: Unknown; Referee: Gavin Colfer

24 September 2021 23	Cabinteely	0-2	Shelbourne	Blackrock, Dublin
19:45 IST	Barnes (yellow card) 35'; Crowley (yellow card) 9'	Report; Highlights	Poynton 10'; M.O'Connor 90'; M.O'Connor (yellow card) 69'	Stadium: Stradbrook Road; Attendance: 700; Referee: David Dunn

1 October 2021 24	Shelbourne	1-0	Treaty United	Drumcondra, Dublin
19:45 IST	Poynton 74' (pen.); M.O'Connor (yellow card) 35'; Brennan (yellow card) 81'; Poynton (yellow card) 85'	Report; Highlights	McNarama (yellow card) 56'	Stadium: Tolka Park; Attendance: 1500; Referee: Alan Patchall

8 October 2021 25	Shelbourne	1-1	Athlone Town	Drumcondra, Dublin
19:45 IST	McManus 24'; Barker (yellow card) 89'	Report; Highlights	Meaney 36'; Friel (yellow card) 65'	Stadium: Tolka Park; Referee: Oliver Moran

15 October 2021 26	Cobh Ramblers	2-0	Shelbourne	Cobh, Cork
19:45 IST	O'Riordan 21'; O'Connell 31'	Report; Highlights		Stadium: St Colman's Park; Referee: Mark Moynihan

29 October 2021 27	Shelbourne	1-1	UCD	Drumcondra, Dublin
19:45 IST	Mahdy 89'; Byrne (yellow card) 23'; Gilchrist (yellow card) 56'; M.O'Connor (yellow card) 90'	Report; Highlights	Caffrey 54'	Stadium: Tolka Park; Referee: Kevin O'Sullivan

=== FAI Cup ===
==== Matches ====
23 July 2021 1st Round	UCD	2–0	Shelbourne	Belfield, Dublin
19:45 IST	Whelan (yellow card) 49'; Whelan 49' (pen.); O'Brien 80'; O'Brien (yellow card) 84'; Healy (yellow card) 87'	Report; Highlights	Rooney (yellow card) 15'; McManus (yellow card) 77'; Brennan (yellow card) 79'; M O'Connor (yellow card) 84'; Barker (yellow card) 90+6'	Stadium: UCD Bowl; Attendance: Unknown; Referee: David Dunne

== Statistics ==
=== Appearances and goals ===
As of match played 29 October 2021. Substitute appearances in brackets.

No	Pos	Nat	Name	League		FAI Cup		Total	
No	Pos	Nat	Name	Apps	Goals	Apps	Goals	Apps	Goals
1	GK	(Republic of Ireland)	Brendan Clarke	25	0	1	0	26	0
2	DF	(Republic of Ireland)	Michael Barker	9 (4)	0	1	0	10 (4)	0
3	DF	(Republic of Ireland)	Kevin O'Connor	24 (1)	1	1	0	25 (1)	1
4	DF	(Scotland)	Ally Gilchrist	26	3	1	0	27	3
5	MF	(Republic of Ireland)	Yassine En-Neyah	6 (4)	1	0	0	6 (4)	1
6	MF	(Republic of Ireland)	Jonathan Lunney	20	0	1	0	21	0
~~7~~	FW	(Republic of Ireland)	Glen McAuley	4 (2)	1	0	0	4 (2)	1
7	MF	(Republic of Ireland)	Eric Molloy	0 (6)	0	0 (1)	0	0 (7)	0
8	MF	(Argentina)	Gerardo Bruna	0	0	0	0	0	0
9	FW	(Republic of Ireland)	Michael O'Connor	21 (4)	7	1	0	22 (4)	7
10	MF	(Republic of Ireland)	Ryan Brennan	23 (4)	15	0 (1)	0	23 (5)	15
11	FW	(Republic of Ireland)	Yousef Mahdy	9 (7)	4	0	0	9 (7)	4
12	MF	(Republic of Ireland)	Denzil Fernandes	0 (2)	0	0 (1)	0	0 (3)	0
14	MF	(Republic of Ireland)	Brian McManus	12 (11)	2	1	0	13 (11)	2
15	DF	(Cameroon)	Maxim Kouogun	9	0	1	0	10	0
16	DF	(Republic of Ireland)	John Ross Wilson	20 (4)	2	0 (1)	0	20 (5)	2
17	MF	(Republic of Ireland)	Shane Farrell	23 (1)	3	1	0	24 (1)	3
18	MF	(Republic of Ireland)	Dayle Rooney	16 (10)	3	1	0	17 (10)	3
~~19~~	MF	(Republic of Ireland)	Sean Quinn	2 (2)	0	0	0	2 (2)	0
19	MF	(Republic of Ireland)	Gavin Molloy	1 (2)	0	0	0	1 (2)	0
20	MF	(Republic of Ireland)	Kyle O'Connor	0	0	0	0	0	0
21	FW	(Republic of Ireland)	Alex Cetiner	0 (3)	0	0	0	0 (3)	0
23	DF	(Republic of Ireland)	Luke Byrne	17	0	0	0	17	0
24	DF/MF	(Republic of Ireland)	David Toure	0 (1)	0	0	0	0 (1)	0
25	GK	(Republic of Ireland)	Jack Brady	1	0	0	0	1	0
26	FW	(Republic of Ireland)	Georgie Poynton	19 (5)	5	1	0	20 (5)	5
28	DF	(Republic of Ireland)	Stephen Negru	0	0	0	0	0	0
30	MF	(Republic of Ireland)	Alex Nolan	0 (3)	0	0	0	0 (3)	0
32	DF	(Republic of Ireland)	Kameron Ledgewidge	7 (1)	0	0	0	7 (1)	0
55	GK	(Republic of Ireland)	Jack McCarthy	1	0	0	0	1	0
60	GK	(Republic of Ireland)	Colm Cox	0 (1)	0	0	0	0 (1)	0
65	FW	(Republic of Ireland)	Stanley Anaebonam	2 (1)	0	0	0	2 (1)	0

- Players listed in italics left the club mid-season
- Source: Extratime.com

=== Goalscorers ===
As of match played 29 October 2021.

No	Pos	Nat	Player	LOI	FAIC	Total
10	MF	(Republic of Ireland)	Ryan Brennan	15	0	15
9	FW	(Republic of Ireland)	Michael O'Connor	7	0	7
26	MF	(Republic of Ireland)	Georgie Poynton	5	0	5
11	FW	(Republic of Ireland)	Yousef Mahdy	4	0	4
17	MF	(Republic of Ireland)	Shane Farrell	3	0	3
18	MF	(Republic of Ireland)	Dayle Rooney	3	0	3
4	DF	(Scotland)	Ally Gilchrist	3	0	3
16	DF	(Republic of Ireland)	John Ross Wilson	2	0	2
14	MF	(Republic of Ireland)	Brian McManus	2	0	2
3	DF	(Republic of Ireland)	Kevin O'Connor	1	0	1
~~7~~	FW	(Republic of Ireland)	Glen McAuley	1	0	1
5	MF	(Republic of Ireland)	Yassine En-Neyah	1	0	1
Opponents				2	0	2
Total				49	0	49

- Players listed in italics left the club mid-season
- Source: Extratime.com

=== Discipline ===
As of match played 29 October 2021.

No	Pos	Nat	Player	LOI		FAIC		Total		Pts
No	Pos	Nat	Player	Booked	Sent off (straight red)	Booked	Sent off (straight red)	Booked	Sent off (straight red)	Pts
9	FW	(Republic of Ireland)	Michael O'Connor	10	0	1	0	11	0	11
10	MF	(Republic of Ireland)	Ryan Brennan	3	0	1	0	4	0	4
~~7~~	FW	(Republic of Ireland)	Glen McAuley	0	1	0	0	0	1	3
17	MF	(Republic of Ireland)	Shane Farrell	3	0	0	0	3	0	3
18	MF	(Republic of Ireland)	Dayle Rooney	1	0	1	0	2	0	2
14	MF	(Republic of Ireland)	Brian McManus	1	0	1	0	2	0	2
2	DF	(Republic of Ireland)	Michael Barker	2	0	1	0	3	0	3
4	DF	(Republic of Ireland)	Ally Gilchrist	3	0	0	0	3	0	3
26	MF	(Republic of Ireland)	Georgie Poynton	2	0	0	0	2	0	2
15	DF	(Cameroon)	Maxim Kouogun	1	0	0	0	1	0	1
12	MF	(Republic of Ireland)	Denil Fernandez	1	0	0	0	1	0	1
12	DF	(Republic of Ireland)	Kevin O'Connor	1	0	0	0	1	0	1
6	MF	(Republic of Ireland)	Jonathan Lunney	1	0	0	0	1	0	1
16	MF	(Republic of Ireland)	John Ross Wilson	1	0	0	0	1	0	1
23	DF	(Republic of Ireland)	Luke Byrne	1	0	0	0	1	0	1
Total				31	1	5	0	36	1	39

- Players listed in italics left the club mid-season.
- Source: Extratime.com

== Kit ==
Supplier: Umbro
Sponsor(s): Hamptons Floor Store (Front of Jersey)
Blåkläder Workwear (Back of Jersey – Top)
Daniel Whelan Tiling & Bathrooms (Back of Jersey – Bottom)
St Patricks' Mental Health Services (Sleeves of Jersey)

Home	Away

New Home & Away kits were released for the 2021 season.

Type	Shirt	Shorts	Socks	Info
Home	Red	Red	Red	Worn 23 times; against Athlone Town (LOI) H(x2) & A, Bray Wanderers (LOI) H(x2) & A, Cabinteely (LOI) H & A(x2), Cobh Ramblers (LOI) H, Cork City (LOI) H & A(x2), Galway United (LOI) H, Treaty United (LOI) H(x2), Wexford (LOI) H(x2) & A, UCD (FAIC) H(x2) (LOI) H & A
Away	Navy	Navy	Navy	Worn 5 times; against Galway United (LOI) A, Cobh Ramblers (LOI) A(x2), Treaty United (LOI) A, Galway United (LOI) A

Key:
H = Home
A = Away
LOI = League of Ireland Premier Division
FAIC = FAI Cup

== Awards ==
- Player of the Year: Ryan Brennan
- Young Player of the Year: Shane Farrell
