= Michael O'Connor (footballer, born 1998) =

Irish footballer (born 1998)

Personal information
- Date of birth: 31 July 1998 (age 28)
- Place of birth: Dundalk, Ireland
- Height: 1.88 m (6 ft 2 in)
- Position: Striker

Team information
- Current team: Oxford Sunnyside

Youth career
- –2010: Dundalk Rangers
- 2010–2013: St Kevin's Boys
- 2013–2014: Bristol City
- 2014–2015: Dundalk

Senior career*
Years	Team	Apps	(Gls)
2015–2016	Dundalk	3	(1)
2017–2018	Shamrock Rovers	21	(3)
2018	→ Finn Harps (loan)	15	(3)
2018–2020	Linfield	29	(9)
2019	→ Waterford (loan)	13	(4)
2020	→ Waterford (loan)	4	(0)
2020	Waterford	7	(3)
2020	Ross County	0	(0)
2021	Shelbourne	25	(7)
2021–2022	Glentoran	15	(2)
2022–2023	Dungannon Swifts	32	(3)
2023	Ytterhogdals IK		
2024	Gottne IF		
2024–2026	Glenavon	53	(4)
2026–	Oxford Sunnyside	0	(0)

International career^{‡}
	Republic of Ireland U19	6	(1)
2019	Republic of Ireland U21	2	(0)
- * Club domestic league appearances and goals as of 03:28, 6 January 2026 (UTC) ‡ National team caps and goals as of 16:29, 9 December 2020 (UTC)

Michael O'Connor (born 31 July 1998) is an Irish professional footballer who plays as a striker for Oxford Sunnyside. He previously played for Scottish Premiership club Ross County, League of Ireland clubs Dundalk, Shamrock Rovers, Finn Harps, Waterford and Shelbourne, NIFL Premiership sides Linfield, Glentoran Dungannon Swifts and Glenavon, and in Sweden for Ytterhogdals IK and Gottne IF.

== Club career ==
=== Early career ===
O'Connor started his career with his local club Rangers in Dundalk. He moved to famous youth club St Kevin's Boys in Dublin in 2010. He finished top goalscorer in his first two seasons which in 2012 saw him chosen for the league representative side of the Dublin & District Schoolboys League for their Kennedy Cup campaign where they became All-Ireland champions. His performances at the Kennedy Cup earned him a move to Bristol City. He returned to his hometown club Dundalk in September 2014, initially playing with their under 19 side in the League of Ireland U19 Division before gradually breaking into the first team squad.

=== Dundalk ===
==== 2015 season ====
Dundalk first team manager Stephen Kenny offered O'Connor his first professional contract which he signed on 22 February 2015, aged just 16 years old. O'Connor made his competitive debut in senior football on 7 April 2015, starting alongside his brother Ciarán O'Connor in a 1–0 win over Shelbourne in the League Cup. He went on to make two more first team appearances in the 2015 season, both in the Leinster Senior Cup, including starting the final which was a 3–1 over Shamrock Rovers at Oriel Park. As well as the Leinster Senior Cup, his first season in senior football saw the club win the President's Cup and a League of Ireland Premier Division and FAI Cup double.

==== 2016 season ====
The first goals of O'Connor's senior career came on 4 April 2016 in a 4–3 Leinster Senior Cup loss away to Bohemians, with O'Connor scoring twice. He made his League of Ireland Premier Division debut against the same opposition, replacing David McMillan late on as his side left Dalymount Park victorious this time, winning 2–0. On 26 August 2016 he made his European debut, coming off the bench in a 1–1 draw with Legia Warsaw in the UEFA Champions League play-off round. O'Connor scored his career first league goal in a 5–2 loss to St Patrick's Athletic at Richmond Park on 25 October 2016. The season turned out to be a historic one for the club as they reached the UEFA Europa League Group Stage for the first time. This run as well as good runs in the other cups resulted in Dundalk playing 55 games over the course of the season but O'Connor only managed to appear in 10 of those games (scoring 4 goals) and began to look elsewhere for playing time with his contract up at the end of the season.

=== Shamrock Rovers ===
He signed for Dublin side Shamrock Rovers on 7 January 2017. O'Connor started off life at Rovers in the best possible way, scoring the winning goal in a 2–1 win over Bohemians in the Dublin derby at Tallaght Stadium on 3 March 2017. He made 2 appearances during Rovers UEFA Europa League Qualifying campaign against Stjarnan of Iceland but found most of his appearances coming from the bench as he made 21 league appearances over the season with just 3 starts, he had to drop down to the club's under 19 side for game time on occasion throughout the season. During the season O'Connor faced Burnley in a friendly and impressed manager Sean Dyche enough to be on the verge of signing him for the Premier League side. Despite O'Connor training with Burnley's first team and doing well, the move broke down, with O'Connor later claiming this was as a result of Dyche being unimpressed with his off-field behaviour after doing background checks on him.

=== Finn Harps ===
A move to Rotherham United was on the cards for O'Connor and he trained with the EFL League One side and was expected to move to the club before the deal fell through on transfer deadline day, with Rotherham manager Paul Warne stating that he would be open to signing him in the future. With O'Connor still in contract until the end of the season with Shamrock Rovers, they opted to send him on a 6-month loan to Finn Harps who were chasing promotion from the League of Ireland First Division, in order to find more playing time. His debut came in the opening game of the season at home to Shelbourne, starting up front alongside his brother Ciáran O'Connor and scored his sides only goal in a 1–1 draw. By the end of his loan spell, he had played 15 league games (14 starts) and scored 3 goals.

=== Linfield ===
On 19 July 2018, it was announced that O'Connor had signed a one-year contract with NIFL Premiership club Linfield after scoring twice as a trialist for the club in a 2–1 win over Waterford in a friendly. As he had done with Shamrock Rovers, O'Connor endeared himself to the fans early, by scoring a crucial goal in the derby when he equalised in the 86th minute away to Cliftonville to salvage a point for his 10-man Linfield side. In October 2018 he was given a one-year contract extension by manager David Healy. O'Connor came off the bench as his side won the 2018–19 Northern Ireland Football League Cup by beating Ballymena United on 16 February 2019. O'Connor finished the season with 9 league goals in 29 league appearances despite just 12 of those being starts, as his side became NIFL Premiership champions. In July 2019 he was linked with a transfer away from Linfield, with Dundee among the clubs reportedly interested in his signature. In 2021, it emerged via Glentoran manager Mick McDermott that his club had bid £10,000 for O'Connor but were rejected by their Belfast rivals just months before he eventually left the club for free.

=== Waterford ===
==== 2019 season ====
O'Connor signed a loan deal with League of Ireland Premier Division side Waterford on 13 July 2019 until the end of the 2019 season. His first goal for the club came in a 1–1 draw with Derry City on 30 August 2019. He finished the season with 6 goals in 18 games as his side finished in 6th place. In October 2019 he underwent a trial with Scottish club Hibernian, and in January 2020 he was linked with a transfer to Glentoran.

==== 2020 season ====
Despite the interest from abroad, he returned to the club on another loan deal ahead of the 2020 season, signing a 6-month loan deal. He was named as club captain before the first game of the season against St Patrick's Athletic by manager Alan Reynolds. O'Connor and his side were just 4 games into the season when it was halted in March due to the Coronavirus pandemic. This saw his loan spell at the club end and he returned to parent club Linfield during the lockdown. On 29 July 2020, it was announced that O'Connor had signed a permanent contract to stay at Waterford until the end of the 2020 season, which was shortened from 36 games to just 18. His first goal of the season came on 18 August 2020, as he opened the scoring away to Sligo Rovers at The Showgrounds. On 21 September 2020 he scored a consolation goal in a 6–1 loss away to his old club Shamrock Rovers in what turned out to be his last appearance for Waterford.

=== Ross County ===
O'Connor signed for Scottish Premiership side Ross County on a two-year deal on 26 September 2020. O'Connor made his Ross County debut on 10 November 2020, coming off the bench for Harry Paton in a 4–1 away win against Elgin City in the Scottish League Cup. He left Ross County having "resigned from his position to return to Ireland" in December 2020, having made just one appearance for the club.

=== Shelbourne ===
On 4 December 2020, he signed for recently relegated club Shelbourne ahead of their 2021 campaign. O'Connor scored 7 goals in 25 league games for the club as they won the 2021 League of Ireland First Division title to earn promotion. He departed the club at the end of the season with Glentoran manager Mick McDermott publicly stating that he was interested in signing him having previously tried to do so while he was a Linfield player before their transfer bid was declined.

=== Glentoran ===
On 24 November 2021 O'Connor returned to the NIFL Premiership, signing for Glentoran, for whom his brother Ciaran O'Connor also plays.

=== Dungannon Swifts ===
He signed for Dungannon Swifts in August 2022. In what proved to be O'Connor's final game for the club, he scored the goal that preserved Dungannon's status as a top flight club, scoring the second goal in the second leg of the relegation/promotion play-off against Annagh United to record a 2–0 victory and therefore 3–2 aggregate win.

=== Sweden ===
It was announced on 14 July 2023 that O'Connor had joined Swedish fourth division side Ytterhogdals IK.

He signed for Gottne IF for the 2024 season.

=== Glenavon ===
O'Connor returned to the NIFL Premiership with Glenavon, signing a one-year deal on 13 June 2024.

=== Oxford Sunnyside ===
O'Connor departed Glenavon to join NIFL Premier Intermediate League side Oxford Sunnyside upon the opening of the January 2026 transfer window. O'Connor had not played for Glenavon since 29 November 2025, having informed the club of his decision to step away from football, citing "personal reasons".

== International career ==
O'Connor has played up to Republic of Ireland up to Under 21 level. He is also eligible to play for Northern Ireland through his Belfast born grandmother and in December 2018 stated that he would be switching allegiance to hopefully play for them. In April 2019 however, after being involved with the Republic of Ireland U21 team he stated that ″I was never going to change, I played underage all the way up and I was never going to change my mind, I'm from the Republic and that's who I want to represent.″

He made his Republic of Ireland U19 debut on 15 November 2015 in a 3–0 win over Latvia U19 at Eamonn Deacy Park in Galway. He scored the winner in a friendly against Austria U19 on 4 September 2016 in a 1–0 win at Tallaght Stadium.

On 24 January 2019, O'Connor received his first Republic of Ireland U21 callup in what was his former Dundalk manager Stephen Kenny's first squad as manager of the under 21 side. He made his debut coming off the bench for Aaron Drinan in the 52nd minute of a 1–0 win over the Republic of Ireland Amateur squad at Whitehall Stadium. He made his first competitive appearance at under 21 level on 24 March 2019 at Tallaght Stadium, replacing Zack Elbouzedi from the bench in a 3–0 win over Luxembourg U21.

== Personal life ==
In February 2020 O'Connor opened up about a gambling addiction he has suffered from.

== Career statistics ==
As of 6 January 2026

Club	Season	League			National cup (Note: Includes FAI Cup, Irish Cup & Scottish Cup)		League Cup (Note: Includes League of Ireland Cup, Northern Ireland Football League Cup & Scottish League Cup)		Europe		Other		Total	
Club	Season	Division	Apps	Goals	Apps	Goals	Apps	Goals	Apps	Goals	Apps	Goals	Apps	Goals
Dundalk	2015	LOI Premier Division	0	0	0	0	1	0	0 (Note: Appearances in UEFA Champions League)	0	2 (Note: Appearances in Leinster Senior Cup)	0	3	0
Dundalk	2016	LOI Premier Division	3	1	3	1	1	0	1	0	2	2	10	4
Dundalk	Total		3	1	3	1	2	0	1	0	4	2	13	4
Shamrock Rovers	2017	LOI Premier Division	21	3	4	1	3	0	2 (Note: Appearances in UEFA Europa League)	0	0	0	30	4
Finn Harps (loan)	2018	LOI First Division	15	3	—		2	1	—		—		17	4
Linfield	2018–19	NIFL Premiership	29	9	2	0	6	2	—		1 (Note: Appearances in County Antrim Shield)	0	38	11
Waterford (loan)	2019	LOI Premier Division	13	4	3	1	1	0	—		1 (Note: Appearances in Scottish Challenge Cup)	1	18	6
Waterford (loan)	2020	LOI Premier Division	4	0	—		—		—		—		4	0
Waterford	2020	LOI Premier Division	7	3	1	0	—		—		—		8	3
Ross County	2020–21	Scottish Premiership	0	0	0	0	1	0	—		—		1	0
Shelbourne	2021	LOI First Division	25	7	1	0	—		—		—		26	7
Glentoran	2021–22	NIFL Premiership	15	2	3	1	0	0	—		0	0	18	3
Dungannon Swifts	2022–23	NIFL Premiership	32	3	1	0	2	0	—		2 (Note: Appearances in NIFL Premiership play-off)	1	37	4
Glenavon	2024–25	NIFL Premiership	37	4	2	2	2	1	—		2 (Note: Appearances in Mid-Ulster Cup)	2	43	9
Glenavon	2025–26	NIFL Premiership	16	0	0	0	2	0	—		2	1	20	1
Career total			217	39	20	6	21	4	3	0	12	7	273	56
