= Georgie Poynton =

Irish footballer (born 1997)

Personal information
- Date of birth: 8 September 1997 (age 29)
- Place of birth: Laytown, County Meath, Ireland
- Position: Defender

Team information
- Current team: Newry City
- Number: 38

Youth career
- East Meath United
- 2013–2016: Dundalk

Senior career*
Years	Team	Apps	(Gls)
2015–2018	Dundalk	10	(0)
2017	→ Bohemians (loan)	25	(4)
2019	St Patrick's Athletic	0	(0)
2019	Waterford	27	(1)
2020–2021	Shelbourne	38	(7)
2022	Drogheda United	27	(1)
2023	Glebe North		
2023–	Newry City	31	(0)

International career
2012	Republic of Ireland U16	3	(0)
2013	Republic of Ireland U17	9	(2)
2014	Republic of Ireland U18		
2015	Republic of Ireland U19	6	(0)
- * Club domestic league appearances and goals as of 1 June 2024

Georgie Poynton (born 8 September 1997) is an Irish professional footballer who plays for NIFL Premiership side Newry City. He has previously played for Dundalk, Bohemians, Saint Patrick's Athletic, Waterford, Shelbourne and Drogheda United. He competed at underage level for the Republic of Ireland national under-19 football team, and was named 2016 FAI Under-19 Player of the Year.

== Club career ==
=== Youth career ===
Poynton started off playing with East Meath United, before moving to Dundalk aged 15 in August 2013. He was "fast-tracked" to the club's under 19s team, despite playing 3 years above his age group. In February 2014, he became the youngest ever player to sign a professional contract with Dundalk, aged just 16 years 5 months old.

=== Dundalk ===
==== 2014 season ====
Poynton made his first team debut for Dundalk on 5 May 2014 in a 3–0 League of Ireland Cup win over Bray Wanderers at the Carlisle Grounds. He went on to make 2 more appearances in the competition that season as Dundalk won the 2014 League of Ireland Cup as well as the league title.

==== 2015 season ====
On 22 May 2015, Poynton made his League of Ireland debut, coming on as a substitute for Ronan Finn in a 2–0 win away to St Patrick's Athletic. He made a total of 8 appearances in all competitions, including 3 in the Leinster Senior Cup, one of which being in the final as his side won the competition by beating Shamrock Rovers 3–1 at Oriel Park. Poynton also picked up a league winners medal as Dundalk retained their League of Ireland Premier Division title as well as winning the 2015 FAI Cup. He signed a new 2-year contract on 5 November 2015.

==== 2016 season ====
Poynton made 9 appearances in all competitions, 4 in the league, 3 in the FAI Cup and 2 in the Leinster Senior Cup, picking up another league winner's medal. Poynton also appeared on the bench as an unused substitute in Dundalk's UEFA Champions League games at home and away against BATE Borisov, as well as away to Legia Warsaw in the Champions League play-off Round Second Leg.

==== 2017 – Bohemians Loan ====
2017 was the first season Poynton was finished up playing Under 19's football with Dundalk alongside senior football and with Dundalk chasing their fourth league title in a row, they opted to send Poynton out on loan in order to get game time at first team level. He was loaned out to Bohemians until the summer ahead of the season. Bohemians extended the loan deal until the end of the season. He made 27 appearances for Bohemians, scoring 5 goals in his first full season as a senior player.

==== 2018 season ====
Poynton returned to Dundalk for the 2018 season, signing a new contract with the club on 8 January 2018. 2018 proved to be a difficult one for Poynton as he struggled to break into the starting eleven ahead of Robbie Benson, Stephen O'Donnell and Chris Shields. He made 11 appearances in all competitions as Dundalk retained their league title and completed the double by beating Cork City to win the FAI Cup at the Aviva Stadium.

=== St Patrick's Athletic ===
On 29 November 2018, it was announced that Poynton had signed for Dublin club St Patrick's Athletic, becoming new manager Harry Kenny's fifth new signing. Poynton made his debut on 18 February in a 3–0 Leinster Senior Cup win over Wexford at Richmond Park. It was announced on 23 February 2019 that Poynton had left the club by mutual consent, having not made the bench in the club's first two league games of the season, with Poynton facing an uphill battle for first team action as the club had signed Chris Forrester and Rhys McCabe in his position after he had signed.

=== Waterford ===
Waterford announced the signing of Poynton the same day it was announced he had left St Patrick's Athletic, with Poynton seeking more first team action. Poynton was a mainstay in the Waterford team that season, playing 32 of their 36 league matches as they finished 6th. His first and only goal for the club came on the final day of the season when he converted a penalty in a 4–2 home win against UCD.

=== Shelbourne ===
==== 2020 season ====
Shelbourne announced the signing of Poynton ahead of their return to the Premier Division for the 2020 season. He made his debut in a 2–1 loss at home to his former club Dundalk. His first goal for the club was a penalty at Oriel Park against the same opposition on 11 September. Poynton also picked up an assist in this match. He scored a header in a 3-1 Dublin Derby loss to Bohemians on 3 October. Shelbourne were relegated back to the First Division after a play off loss to Longford Town, but Poynton renewed his contract with the club for another season, after ending the campaign with 2 goals and 2 assists in 15 appearances

==== 2021 season ====
Poynton started the 2021 season scoring two goals to save a 3–3 draw with Bray Wanderers on matchday two. He got the winning goal when Shelbourne travelled to Wexford on 18 June, and assisted the following week when they recorded a win over Cork City. He was on the scoresheet again against Cabinteely, and his penalty against Treaty United on 1 October gave Shelbourne a win that officially confirmed them as First Division champions. Poynton left Shelbourne in December 2021 upon expiry of his contract. In total he made 40 appearances for the club, scoring 7 goals and 6 assists

=== Drogheda United ===
After leaving Shelbourne, Poynton signed for his hometown club Drogheda United. He made his debut against his former club Shelbourne on the opening day of the season. He scored his first and only goal for the club away to Sligo Rovers on 23 April. Poynton made 29 appearances as a right back in all competitions as Drogheda avoided relegation by finishing 8th place.

=== Newry City ===
As of 2024, he was playing for the semi-professional side Newry City.

== International career ==
Poynton has played at underage level for Ireland right up from under 16 to under 19 levels as well as competing at Universities International level, captaining his team at all levels. In March 2017, Poynton was named Republic of Ireland U19 Player of the Year.

== Career statistics ==
Professional appearances – correct as of 9 September 2022.

Club	Division	Season	League		Cup		League Cup		Europe		Other		Total	
Club	Division	Season	Apps	Goals	Apps	Goals	Apps	Goals	Apps	Goals	Apps	Goals	Apps	Goals
Dundalk	League of Ireland Premier Division	2014	0	0	0	0	3	0	0 (Note: Appearances in UEFA Europa League)	0	0 (Note: Appearances in Leinster Senior Cup)	0	3	0
Dundalk	League of Ireland Premier Division	2015	2	0	0	0	3	0	0 (Note: Appearances in UEFA Champions League)	0	3	0	8	0
Dundalk	League of Ireland Premier Division	2016	4	0	3	0	0	0	0	0	2	0	9	0
Bohemians	League of Ireland Premier Division	2017	25	4	0	0	1	0	—		1	1	27	5
Dundalk	League of Ireland Premier Division	2018	4	0	0	0	3	0	0	0	4 (Note: 3 appearances in Leinster Senior Cup, 1 appearance in President's Cup)	0	11	0
Dundalk	Dundalk Total		10	0	3	0	9	0	0	0	9	0	31	0
St Patrick's Athletic	League of Ireland Premier Division	2019	0	0	—		—		—		1	0	1	0
Waterford	League of Ireland Premier Division	2019	27	1	2	0	2	0	—		0	0	31	1
Shelbourne	League of Ireland Premier Division	2020	14	2	1	0	—		—		0 (Note: Appearances in the League of Ireland play-offs)	0	15	2
Shelbourne	League of Ireland First Division	2021	24	5	1	0	—		—		—		25	5
Shelbourne	Shelbourne Total		38	7	2	0	—		—		0	0	40	7
Drogheda United	League of Ireland Premier Division	2022	27	1	2	0	—		—		—		29	1
Career Total			127	13	9	0	12	0	0	0	11	1	159	14

== Honours ==
=== Club ===
Dundalk

- League of Ireland Premier Division (4): 2014, 2015, 2016, 2018
- FAI Cup (2): 2015, 2018
- League of Ireland Cup (1): 2014
- President's Cup (1): 2015
- Leinster Senior Cup (1): 2015

Shelbourne

- League of Ireland First Division (1): 2021

=== Individual ===
- Republic of Ireland U19 Player of the Year: 2016
