= Paul Doyle (Irish footballer) =

Irish footballer

Personal information
- Date of birth: 10 April 1998 (age 28)
- Place of birth: Westport, County Mayo, Ireland
- Position: Midfielder

Team information
- Current team: Dungannon Swifts
- Number: 21

Youth career
- –2014: Westport United
- 2014–2017: Sligo Rovers

Senior career*
Years	Team	Apps	(Gls)
2016–2017	Sligo Rovers	1	(0)
2018–2021	UCD	89	(0)
2022–2024	Dundalk	69	(5)
2025	Drogheda United	8	(1)
2026–	Dungannon Swifts	13	(0)
- * Club domestic league appearances and goals as of 6 July 2026

Paul Doyle (born 10 April 1998) is an Irish professional footballer who plays as a midfielder for NIFL Premiership club Dungannon Swifts. His previous clubs are Sligo Rovers, UCD, Dundalk and Drogheda United.

== Career ==
=== Youth career ===
Westport, County Mayo native Doyle began playing with local club Westport United, before joining the academy of League of Ireland club Sligo Rovers in 2014, where he played for their under-19 side for 4 seasons.

=== Sligo Rovers ===
Doyle made his senior debut for Sligo Rovers in a 2–1 loss away to Derry City at the Brandywell Stadium. The following season he made 2 appearances in the League of Ireland Cup, but those were his only 3 senior appearances for the club as he left at the end of the season.

=== UCD ===
Doyle signed for League of Ireland First Division club UCD ahead of the 2018 season. On 7 February 2018, he was part of the squad that won the Collingwood Cup by defeating Queen's University Belfast 2–1 in the final. Doyle was part of the team that drew 1–1 with Finn Harps on 14 September 2018 to win the 2018 League of Ireland First Division title and promotion to the Premier Division. On 24 September 2019, he scored his first goal in senior football in a 4–1 win over Crumlin United in the Leinster Senior Cup. On 18 October 2019, Doyle and UCD were relegated back to the First Division after a 3–0 loss to Shamrock Rovers at the UCD Bowl. After losing in the 2020 Playoffs, Doyle and UCD were promoted back to the League of Ireland Premier Division at the second time of asking in 2021, defeating Waterford 2–1 in the playoff final at Richmond Park on 26 November 2021. He was voted into the PFAI First Division Team of the Year by his fellow professionals. He scored 4 goals in 108 appearances during his 4 years with the club.

=== Dundalk ===
On 19 December 2021, Doyle signed for League of Ireland Premier Division side Dundalk ahead of their 2022 season. On 6 May 2022, he scored his first goal for the club, opening the scoring in a 2–2 draw away to his former club UCD at the UCD Bowl. On 18 November 2022, he signed a new 2-year contract with the club. He made his first career appearances in European competition in the summer of 2023, playing at home and away in a UEFA Europa Conference League tie with KA Akureyri of Iceland as Dundalk were defeated 5–3 on aggregate. On 29 September 2023, he scored in a 3–1 win in the Louth Derby as his side defeated Drogheda United 3–1 at Oriel Park. In July 2024, he suffered a hamstring injury that kept him out of action for 10 weeks. In October 2024, the club were relegated to the First Division for the first time since 2008. He scored 6 goals in 79 appearances during 3 seasons with the club.

=== Drogheda United ===
Doyle signed for Dundalk's Louth Derby rivals Drogheda United on 17 January 2025. Following an injury hit spell that saw him miss a large portion of the club's games, he scored his first goal for the club on 19 September 2025, in a 1–1 draw away to his former club Sligo Rovers.

=== Dungannon Swifts ===
On 26 January 2026, Doyle signed for NIFL Premiership club Dungannon Swifts. On 2 May 2026, he scored in the Final of the 2025–26 Irish Cup, as his side were defeated 3–2 by Coleraine at Windsor Park.

== Career statistics ==
As of match played on 12 May 2026

Appearances and goals by club, season and competition
Club	Season	League			National Cup (Note: Includes FAI Cup)		League Cup (Note: Includes League of Ireland Cup)		Europe		Other		Total	
Club	Season	Division	Apps	Goals	Apps	Goals	Apps	Goals	Apps	Goals	Apps	Goals	Apps	Goals
Sligo Rovers	2016	LOI Premier Division	1	0	0	0	0	0	–		–		1	0
Sligo Rovers	2017	LOI Premier Division	0	0	0	0	2	0	–		0 (Note: Appearance(s) in the Scottish Challenge Cup)	0	2	0
Sligo Rovers	Total		1	0	0	0	2	0	–		0	0	3	0
UCD	2018	LOI First Division	21	0	4	0	1	0	—		1 (Note: Appearance(s) in the Leinster Senior Cup)	0	27	0
UCD	2019	LOI Premier Division	28	0	1	0	2	0	—		2	1	33	1
UCD	2020	LOI First Division	16	0	1	1	—		—		1 (Note: Appearance in the 2020 League of Ireland First Division Promotion/Relegation Playoffs)	0	18	1
UCD	2021	LOI First Division	24	0	3	0	—		—		4 (Note: Appearances in the 2021 League of Ireland First Division Promotion/Relegation Playoffs)	2	31	2
UCD	Total		89	0	9	1	3	0	–		7	3	108	4
Dundalk	2022	LOI Premier Division	25	2	2	1	—		—		—		27	3
Dundalk	2023	LOI Premier Division	25	3	1	0	—		2 (Note: Appearance(s) in the UEFA Europa Conference League)	0	0	0	28	3
Dundalk	2024	LOI Premier Division	19	0	0	0	—		—		3	0	22	0
Dundalk	Total		69	5	3	1	–		2	0	5	0	79	6
Drogheda United	2025	LOI Premier Division	8	1	1	0	—		—		3 (Note: 1 appearance in the President of Ireland's Cup; 2 appearances in the Leinster Senior Cup)	0	12	1
Dungannon Swifts	2025–26	NIFL Premiership	13	0	4	1	—		—		3 (Note: Appearances in the 2026 NIFL Premiership European Playoffs)	0	20	1
Career Total			212	6	17	3	5	0	2	0	18	3	181	12
