= Yassine En-Neyah =

Irish footballer

Personal information
- Full name: Yassine En-Neyah
- Date of birth: 10 June 2000 (age 26)
- Place of birth: Oued Zem, Morocco
- Height: 5 ft 11 in (1.80 m)
- Positions: Winger; attacking midfielder

Team information
- Current team: Truro City
- Number: 7

Youth career
- –2015: Corduff FC
- 2015–2017: Bohemians
- 2017–2021: Nottingham Forest

Senior career*
Years	Team	Apps	(Gls)
2020–2021	Nottingham Forest	0	(0)
2021	Shelbourne	10	(1)
2022	Waterford	26	(0)
2023	Truro City	11	(1)
2023–2024	Colchester United	0	(0)
2023–2024	→ Maldon & Tiptree (loan)	15	(0)
2024–	Truro City	60	(0)

International career
- Republic of Ireland U16
- * Club domestic league appearances and goals as of 13:04, 3 February 2026 (UTC)

Yassine En-Neyah (born 10 June 2000) is a professional footballer who plays as a winger or attacking midfielder for Truro City. Born in Morocco, he is a youth international for Ireland.

== Early life ==
En-Neyah was born in Morocco and moved to Ireland at an early age when his mother moved the family to Dublin. He grew up in the Corduff area of Blanchardstown, playing for his local club Corduff FC, before moving onto League of Ireland club Bohemians.

== Club career ==
=== Nottingham Forest ===
En-Neyah joined the Nottingham Forest academy in 2017 from Irish club Bohemians.

He made his professional debut on 5 January 2020, appearing as an 81st-minute substitute during an FA Cup third round match against Chelsea.

Following the 2020–21 season, En-Neyah was not listed on Forest's retained player list.

=== Shelbourne ===
On 30 July 2021, it was announced that En-Neyah had signed for League of Ireland First Division side Shelbourne. He made his debut on the same day, in a 2–2 draw at home to Cobh Ramblers. He scored his first goal in senior football on 3 September 2021, in a 4–0 win over Wexford at Tolka Park. He accumulated a total of 10 appearances and 1 goal for the club, as they went on to win the 2021 League of Ireland First Division.

=== Waterford ===
On 2 January 2022, En-Neyah signed with First Division side Waterford, following former Shelbourne manager Ian Morris to the club.

=== Truro City ===
On 24 February 2023, En-Neyah joined Southern Football League side Truro City.

=== Colchester United ===
On 1 September 2023, En-Neyah joined Colchester United on a one-year contract, and then immediately joined Maldon & Tiptree on loan.

=== Return to Truro City ===
On 25 July 2024, En-Neyah signed for his former club Truro City in the National League South.

On 7 November 2026, En-Neyah collapsed while warming for a game against Folkestone Invicta and was rushed into hospital but luckily survived

== International career ==
En-Neyah was born in Morocco but holds Irish citizenship having been raised in Ireland and has represented the country at under-16 level. He is also eligible to represent Italy through his mother.

== Career statistics ==
As of match played 26 April 2025

Appearances and goals by club, season and competition
Club	Season	League			National Cup (Note: Includes FA Cup & FAI Cup)		League Cup (Note: Includes EFL Cup & League of Ireland Cup)		Other		Total	
Club	Season	Division	Apps	Goals	Apps	Goals	Apps	Goals	Apps	Goals	Apps	Goals
Nottingham Forest	2019–20	EFL Championship	0	0	1	0	0	0	—		1	0
Nottingham Forest	2020–21	EFL Championship	0	0	0	0	0	0	—		0	0
Nottingham Forest	Total		0	0	1	0	0	0	0	0	1	0
Shelbourne	2021	League of Ireland First Division	10	1	—		—		—		10	1
Waterford	2022	League of Ireland First Division	26	0	3	0	—		4 (Note: 1 appearance in the Munster Senior Cup & 3 appearances in the 2022 League of Ireland promotion/relegation playoffs)	0	33	0
Truro City	2022–23	Southern League Premier Division South	11	1	0	0	–		2 (Note: 2 appearances in Southern League Premier Division South play-offs)	0	13	1
Colchester United	2023–24	EFL League Two	0	0	0	0	0	0	0	0	0	0
Maldon & Tiptree (loan)	2023–24	Isthmian League North Division	15	0	1	0	–		3 (Note: 2 appearances in Essex Senior Cup, 1 appearance in FA Trophy)	0	19	0
Truro City	2024–25	National League South	40	0	0	0	–		1 (Note: Appearances in FA Trophy)	0	41	0
Career total			102	2	5	0	0	0	10	0	117	2
