= Ally Gilchrist =

Scottish footballer

Personal information
- Date of birth: 3 March 1995 (age 31)
- Place of birth: Edinburgh, Scotland
- Height: 1.89 m (6 ft 2 in)
- Position: Centre back

Youth career
- 2011–2014: St Johnstone

Senior career*
Years	Team	Apps	(Gls)
2014–2017	St Johnstone	2	(0)
2014–2015	→ Elgin City (loan)	21	(3)
2015–2016	→ Peterhead (loan)	28	(2)
2018	Shamrock Rovers	13	(0)
2019–2020	Derry City	35	(0)
2021	Shelbourne	26	(3)
2022–2023	Cork City	47	(2)
- * Club domestic league appearances and goals as of 13:20, 22 January 2024 (UTC)

Ally Gilchrist (born 3 March 1995) is a Scottish professional footballer who plays as a defender most recently for Cork City. He has previously played for St Johnstone, Elgin City, Peterhead, Shamrock Rovers, Derry City and Shelbourne.

== Career ==
Ally has been in the St Johnstone youth ranks since 2011. During this time he has spent the majority of his career on loan in Scotland's lower leagues, firstly with Elgin City and then with Peterhead. He made his St Johnstone debut in a 2017–18 UEFA Europa League match against FK Trakai. Gilchrist was released by St Johnstone in December 2017. He signed for League of Ireland Premier Division club Shamrock Rovers soon after his release for the year of 2018 and was transferred to Derry City for 2019, where he played for two seasons. In December 2020, he left Derry to join recently relegated Shelbourne in the League of Ireland First Division.

After winning the 2021 First Division title with Shelbourne, Gilchrist signed for Cork City for the 2022 season to win it again.

== Career statistics ==
As of match played on 25 September 2023

Appearances and goals by club, season and competition
Club	Season	League			National Cup		League Cup		Europe		Other		Total	
Club	Season	Division	Apps	Goals	Apps	Goals	Apps	Goals	Apps	Goals	Apps	Goals	Apps	Goals
St Johnstone	2011–12	Scottish Premiership	0	0	0	0	0	0	—		0	0	0	0
St Johnstone	2012–13	Scottish Premiership	0	0	0	0	0	0	—		0	0	0	0
St Johnstone	2013–14	Scottish Premiership	0	0	0	0	0	0	—		0	0	0	0
St Johnstone	2014–15	Scottish Premiership	0	0	0	0	0	0	—		0	0	0	0
Elgin City (loan)	2014–15	Scottish League Two	21	3	—		—		—		—		21	3
St Johnstone	2015–16	Scottish Premiership	0	0	—		—		0 (Note: Appearances in UEFA Europa League)	0	—		0	0
Peterhead (loan)	2015–16	Scottish League One	28	2	0	0	0	0	—		4 (Note: Appearances in Scottish Challenge Cup)	0	32	2
St Johnstone	2016–17	Scottish Premiership	0	0	0	0	0	0	—		—		0	0
St Johnstone	2017–18	Scottish Premiership	0	0	0	0	0	0	2	0	1	0	3	0
St Johnstone	Total		0	0	0	0	0	0	2	0	1	0	3	0
Shamrock Rovers	2018	LOI Premier Division	11	0	0	0	1	0	0	0	1 (Note: Appearances in Leinster Senior Cup)	0	13	0
Derry City	2019	LOI Premier Division	29	0	1	0	3	0	—		—		33	0
Derry City	2020	LOI Premier Division	6	0	0	0	—		0	0	—		6	0
Derry City	Total		35	0	1	0	3	0	0	0	—		39	0
Shelbourne	2021	LOI First Division	26	3	1	0	—		—		—		27	3
Cork City	2022	LOI First Division	26	2	0	0	—		—		0	0	26	2
Cork City	2023	LOI Premier Division	21	0	2	0	—		—		0	0	23	0
Cork City	Total		47	2	2	0	—		—		0	0	29	2
Career Total			168	10	4	0	4	0	2	0	6	0	194	10

== Honours ==
Shelbourne

- League of Ireland First Division: 2021

Cork City

- League of Ireland First Division: 2022
