= 2018 League of Ireland Premier Division =

League of Ireland Premier Division
- Season: 2018
- Dates: 16 February – 26 October 2018
- Champions: Dundalk (13th title)
- Relegated: Limerick; Bray Wanderers
- Champions League: Dundalk
- Europa League: Cork City; Shamrock Rovers Waterford
- Matches: 180
- Goals: 501 (2.78 per match)
- Top goalscorer: Patrick Hoban (29 Goals)
- Biggest home win: Dundalk 8-0 Limerick
- Biggest away win: Bray Wanderers 0-5 Bohemians
- Highest scoring: Waterford 3-6 Limerick
- Highest attendance: 6,672 Cork City 1–0 Dundalk
- Total attendance: 384,520
- Average attendance: 2,136
- All statistics correct as of 2 November 2018.

The 2018 League of Ireland Premier Division was the 34th season of the League of Ireland Premier Division. The league began on 16 February 2018 and concluded on 26 October 2018. Due to the decision to reduce the number of clubs in the Premier Division from 12 to 10, the promotion/relegation playoff was cancelled and only one club, Waterford F.C., was promoted.

On 5 October, Dundalk won the title after a 1–1 draw with St Patrick's Athletic.

== Overview ==
The Premier Division consists of 10 teams. Each team plays each other four times for a total of 36 matches in the season.

Waterford, the 2017 First Division champion, were promoted to the league for the first time since 2007.

On 22 December 2016, the Football Association of Ireland announced that the league would be restructured into two 10-team divisions from the 2018 season onwards, one of the recommendations made in the 2015 Conroy Report.

== Teams ==
=== Stadia and locations ===
Locations of Premier Division teams
Locations of Dublin Premier Division teams

Team	Location	Stadium
Bohemians	Phibsborough	Dalymount Park
Bray Wanderers	Bray	Carlisle Grounds
Cork City	Cork	Turners Cross
Derry City	Derry	The Brandywell
Dundalk	Dundalk	Oriel Park
Limerick	Limerick	Markets Field
St Patrick's Athletic	Inchicore	Richmond Park
Shamrock Rovers	Tallaght	Tallaght Stadium
Sligo Rovers	Sligo	The Showgrounds
Waterford	Waterford	RSC

=== Personnel and kits ===
Note: Flags indicate national team as has been defined under FIFA eligibility rules. Players may hold more than one non-FIFA nationality.

Team	Manager	Captain	Kit manufacturer	Shirt sponsor
Bohemians	(Republic of Ireland) Keith Long	(Republic of Ireland) Derek Pender	Hummel	Mr Green Sport
Bray Wanderers	(Republic of Ireland) Gary Cronin	(Republic of Ireland) Gary McCabe	Nike	O Driscoll O Neil Insurance
Cork City	(Republic of Ireland) John Caulfield	(Republic of Ireland) Conor McCormack	Adidas	University College Cork
Derry City	(Northern Ireland) Declan Devine	(Northern Ireland) Gerard Doherty	Adidas	Diamond Corrugated
Dundalk	(Republic of Ireland) Stephen Kenny	(Republic of Ireland) Stephen O'Donnell	CX+ Sport	Fyffes
Limerick	(Republic of Ireland) Tommy Barrett	(Republic of Ireland) Shane Duggan	Umbro	Betsat.com
St Patrick's Athletic	(Republic of Ireland) Liam Buckley	(Republic of Ireland) Ian Bermingham	Umbro	MIG Insurance Brokers
Shamrock Rovers	(Republic of Ireland) Stephen Bradley	(Republic of Ireland) Ronan Finn	New Balance	Pepper Money
Sligo Rovers	(Northern Ireland) Gerard Lyttle	(Republic of Ireland) Kyle Callan-McFadden	Joma	Volkswagen
Waterford	(Republic of Ireland) Alan Reynolds	(Republic of Ireland) Paul Keegan	Umbro	21 Bet

=== Managerial changes ===
Team	Outgoing manager	Manner of departure	Date of vacancy	Position in table	Incoming manager	Date of appointment
Limerick	(England) Neil McDonald	Signed by Scunthorpe United	4 January 2018	Pre-season	(Republic of Ireland) Tommy Barrett	14 January 2018
Bray Wanderers	(Republic of Ireland) Dave Mackey	Resigned	8 April 2018	10th	(Republic of Ireland) Graham Kelly	10 April 2018
Bray Wanderers	(Republic of Ireland) Graham Kelly	End of caretaker spell	8 July 2018	10th	(Republic of Ireland) Martin Russell	8 July 2018
Derry City	(Northern Ireland) Kenny Shiels	Sacked	27 October 2018	8th	(Northern Ireland) Declan Devine	16 November 2018

== League table ==
Pos	Team	Pld	W	D	L	GF	GA	GD	Pts	Qualification or relegation
1	Dundalk (C)	36	27	6	3	85	20	+65	87	Qualification for Champions League first qualifying round
2	Cork City	36	24	5	7	71	27	+44	77	Qualification for Europa League first qualifying round (Note: Since the winners of the 2018 FAI Cup, Dundalk, qualified for European competition based on their league position, the spot awarded to the Cup winner (Europa League first qualifying round) would normally pass to the next best-placed team (the fourth-placed team). However, as Waterford were adjudged by UEFA to have not passed the "three-year rule" as they were reformed in 2016, the spot was passed to the fifth-placed team.)
3	Shamrock Rovers	36	18	8	10	57	27	+30	62	Qualification for Europa League first qualifying round
4	Waterford	36	18	5	13	52	44	+8	59	
5	St Patrick's Athletic	36	15	5	16	51	47	+4	50	Qualification for Europa League first qualifying round
6	Bohemians	36	13	9	14	52	45	+7	48	
7	Sligo Rovers	36	12	6	18	38	50	−12	42	
8	Derry City	36	13	3	20	47	70	−23	42	
9	Limerick (R)	36	7	6	23	25	75	−50	27	Qualification for relegation play-offs
10	Bray Wanderers (R)	36	5	3	28	23	96	−73	18	Relegation to League of Ireland First Division

Source: SSE Airtricity League, Soccerway
Rules for classification: 1) Points; 2) Goal difference; 3) Goals scored.
(C) Champions; (R) Relegated

== Results ==
=== Matches 1–18 ===
Teams played each other twice (once at home, once away).

Home \ Away	BOH	BRW	COR	DER	DUN	LIM	STP	SHM	SLI	WAT
Bohemians	—	2–1	0–2	0–1	0–2	0–0	0–1	3–1	2–2	0–1
Bray Wanderers	1–3	—	0–4	2–1	0–2	0–1	1–2	1–0	1–2	2–2
Cork City	3–0	4–0	—	4–2	1–0	2–1	1–0	1–0	1–0	2–0
Derry City	3–1	5–1	0–0	—	1–4	5–0	2–1	0–0	0–2	1–0
Dundalk	3–0	0–0	1–0	2–2	—	8–0	5–0	2–1	2–1	1–0
Limerick	1–1	1–0	1–1	0–3	0–3	—	0–1	0–1	1–2	0–2
St Patrick's Athletic	2–2	5–0	2–3	5–2	0–0	1–0	—	2–0	2–0	1–0
Shamrock Rovers	1–2	6–0	3–0	6–1	0–0	1–1	1–0	—	1–0	1–1
Sligo Rovers	0–2	2–1	1–4	2–1	0–2	0–1	0–0	0–0	—	1–2
Waterford	1–0	3–0	2–1	2–1	2–1	3–6	2–0	2–1	1–1	—

Source: SSE Airtricity League, Soccerway
Legend: Blue = home team win; Yellow = draw; Red = away team win.
For upcoming matches, an "a" indicates there is an article about the rivalry between the two participants.

=== Matches 19–36 ===
Teams will play each other twice (once home, once away).

Home \ Away	BOH	BRW	COR	DER	DUN	LIM	STP	SHM	SLI	WAT
Bohemians	—	6–0	4–2	1–2	1–1	5–0	1–0	1–1	0–3	1–3
Bray Wanderers	0–5	—	1–3	2–1	1–3	0–2	3–1	0–3	2–1	0–0
Cork City	1–0	5–1	—	5–0	0–1	3–0	1–1	0–0	1–2	3–0
Derry City	0–2	2–0	0–3	—	0–4	2–1	2–1	0–1	1–2	1–2
Dundalk	2–0	5–0	2–1	3–2	—	4–0	1–1	1–2	5–0	2–0
Limerick	1–1	2–1	0–2	0–1	0–1	—	0–4	0–2	1–3	2–1
St Patrick's Athletic	1–3	3–0	1–3	5–0	1–3	2–1	—	0–1	0–3	3–0
Shamrock Rovers	0–1	5–0	0–0	2–0	2–5	5–0	3–0	—	2–0	3–1
Sligo Rovers	1–1	2–1	0–2	0–2	0–2	0–0	1–2	2–0	—	2–3
Waterford	1–1	2–0	1–2	4–0	1–2	4–1	2–0	0–1	1–0	—

Source: SSE Airtricity League, Soccerway
Legend: Blue = home team win; Yellow = draw; Red = away team win.
For upcoming matches, an "a" indicates there is an article about the rivalry between the two participants.

=== Promotion/relegation playoff ===
Limerick, the ninth-placed team from the Premier Division took part in a two-legged play-off against Finn Harps, the winners of the 2018 First Division play-off, to decide who will play in the 2019 Premier Division.

29 October 2018	Finn Harps	1–0	Limerick	Finn Park
19:45 GMT	McCourt 35' (pen.)	Report		Attendance: 2,379; Referee: Robert Harvey

2 November 2018	Limerick	0–2	Finn Harps	Markets Field
19:45 GMT		Report	Timlin 45+1'; Boyle 80'	Referee: Graham Kelly

Finn Harps won 3–0 on aggregate and were promoted to 2019 Premier Division. Limerick were relegated to the 2019 First Division.

== Season statistics ==
As of 2 November 2018

=== Scoring ===
==== Top scorers ====
Rank	Player	Club	Goals
1	(Republic of Ireland) Patrick Hoban	Dundalk	29
2	(Republic of Ireland) Kieran Sadlier	Cork City	16
3	(Republic of Ireland) Graham Cummins	Cork City	15
4	(Republic of Ireland) Graham Burke	Shamrock Rovers	13
4	(Northern Ireland) Michael Duffy	Dundalk	13
6	(England) Daniel Carr	Shamrock Rovers	11
6	(Republic of Ireland) Daniel Corcoran	Bohemians	11
8	(Republic of Ireland) Courtney Duffus	Waterford	10
8	(Northern Ireland) Aaron McEneff	Derry City	10
10	(Republic of Ireland) Robbie Benson	Dundalk	9

Last updated: 2 November 2018.
Source: SSEAirtricity League

==== Hat-tricks ====
Player	For	Against	Result	Date	Ref
(Republic of Ireland) Dinny Corcoran	Bohemians	Bray Wanderers	5–0 (A)	19 October 2018	
(Republic of Ireland) Graham Cummins	Cork City	Sligo Rovers	4–1 (A)	24 February 2018	
(Republic of Ireland) Graham Burke^{4}	Shamrock Rovers	Derry City	6-1 (H)	9 March 2018	
(Republic of Ireland) Ronan Hale	Derry City	Limerick	5–0 (H)	12 March 2018	
(Republic of Ireland) Patrick Hoban	Dundalk	Limerick	4–0 (H)	8 June 2018	

=== Discipline ===
==== Club ====
- Most yellow cards: 94
  - Sligo Rovers
- Most red cards: 7
  - Waterford

== Awards ==
=== Player of the Month ===
Month	Player	Club	References
February	(Republic of Ireland) Graham Cummins	Cork City	
March	(Republic of Ireland) Graham Burke	Shamrock Rovers	
April	(Northern Ireland) Michael Duffy	Dundalk	
May	(Republic of Ireland) Seán Hoare	Dundalk	
June	(Republic of Ireland) Patrick Hoban	Dundalk	
July	(Republic of Ireland) Gavin Bazunu	Shamrock Rovers	
August	(Northern Ireland) Michael Duffy	Dundalk	
September	(Republic of Ireland) Chris Shields	Dundalk	
October/November	(Republic of Ireland) Patrick McEleney	Dundalk	

=== Annual Awards ===
Award	Winner	Club
Premier Division Player of the Year	(Northern Ireland) Michael Duffy	Dundalk
Premier Division Young Player of the Year	(Republic of Ireland) Jamie McGrath	Dundalk
Premier Division Manager of the Year	(Republic of Ireland) Stephen Kenny	Dundalk

PFAI Team of the Year
Goalkeeper	(Republic of Ireland) Shane Supple (Bohemians)			
Defence	(Republic of Ireland) Sean Gannon (Dundalk)	(Republic of Ireland) Seán Hoare (Dundalk)	(Republic of Ireland) Seán McLoughlin (Cork City)	(Republic of Ireland) Darragh Leahy (Bohemians)
Midfield	(Republic of Ireland) Chris Shields (Dundalk)		(France) Bastien Hery (Waterford)	(Republic of Ireland) Robbie Benson (Dundalk)
Attack	(Republic of Ireland) Kieran Sadlier (Cork City)		(Republic of Ireland) Patrick Hoban (Dundalk)	(Northern Ireland) Michael Duffy (Dundalk)

== Attendances ==
No.	Club	Average
1	Cork City	4,086
2	Dundalk	2,801
3	Shamrock Rovers	2,758
4	Waterford United	2,314
5	Bohemian	2,143
6	Derry City	2,061
7	Sligo Rovers	1,800
8	St. Patrick's Athletic	1,733
9	Limerick	998
10	Bray Wanderers	694

== See also ==
- 2018 League of Ireland First Division
- 2018 FAI Cup
- 2018 League of Ireland Cup
- 2018 St Patrick's Athletic F.C. season
