= Dublin County F.C. =

Irish soccer (association football) club

- Founded: 2020
- Dissolved: 2021
- Ground: Morton Stadium
- Capacity: 4,000 (800 seated)
- Owner(s): Alex Geraldino, Sibrena Geraldino
- Chairman: Dennis Lukens
- Manager: Dennis Lukens

Dublin County F.C. was a short-lived Irish soccer (association football) club based in Dublin. The club made an unsuccessful application to participate in the 2021 League of Ireland First Division.

== History ==
Dublin County FC were backed by a group of investors calling themselves Irish Sea FC, which had launched an ultimately unsuccessful effort to buy Cabinteely in 2020. Among the group's directors were former Sunderland captain Chris Makin, former Crystal Palace player Jamie Fullarton, American coach Dennis Lukens, and Alex and Sibrena Geraldino, co-owners of American club New Jersey Teamsterz. The Geraldinos were a married couple who had left their jobs to pursue their ambition of owning a football club. They had also taken part in a Discovery Channel documentary called I Quit, which followed selected entrepreneurs as they established new ventures.

Alex and Sibrena Geraldino were co-owners of New Jersey Teamsterz, who competed in the National Independent Soccer Association (NISA), the third tier of U.S. soccer. They discussed the Irish project on the BSMA podcast, explaining that it was intended to provide a pathway to Europe for their U.S. players, while also facilitating Irish-based players moving in the opposite direction. They recruited Dennis Lukens to oversee operations in Ireland as the club began its application process with the FAI. They also intended for Lukens to manage the side, having previously managed teams in the United States and Ukraine. In 2021, Lukens began recruiting players primarily from Armenian First League side Noravank SC. Other players from the lower leagues of Armenian and Ukrainian football were also approached about playing for Dublin County. The club played several friendly matches against local Dublin sides between late 2020 and early 2021.

== Stadium issues and unsuccessful licence bid ==
On 22 February 2021, it was reported that the management of Morton Stadium had reneged on an agreement with the club at the last minute. The apparent reasons given included mounting pressure from the athletics community to retain exclusive use of the stadium grounds in preparation for the delayed 2020 Olympic Games in Tokyo. That evening, Lukens told The Irish Times that he would consult his legal advisers on whether there was a basis to pursue the matter, describing the organisation's conduct as "absolutely unacceptable and unprofessional". Dublin County were informed at 2:43pm that the stadium would not be made available for their use. With no alternative stadium available and the FAI deadline falling at 4:30pm that same day, Dublin County were left without a home ground. The club expressed frustration at the outcome, having already signed contracts with two full-time staff members and 20 players in preparation for the season. Treaty United were subsequently given the vacant place as the 10-team First Division was finalised for 2021. It remained unclear whether Dublin County would apply to participate in future seasons.
