= 2018 League of Ireland First Division =

League of Ireland First Division
- Season: 2018
- Dates: 23 February – 22 September 2018
- Champions: UCD
- Promoted: UCD; Finn Harps
- Matches: 135
- Goals: 397 (2.94 per match)
- Top goalscorer: David O'Sullivan (Shelbourne, 15 goals)
- Biggest home win: Shelbourne 7–0 Athlone Town (6 April 2018); Wexford 7–0 Athlone Town (20 April 2018)
- Biggest away win: Wexford 0–8 UCD (7 May 2018)
- Highest scoring: Wexford 1–8 Drogheda United (16 March 2018)
- Total attendance: 59,946
- Average attendance: 422
- All statistics correct as of 2 November 2018.

The 2018 League of Ireland First Division season was the 34th season of the League of Ireland First Division. The league began on 23 February 2018 and concluded on 22 September 2018. Contrary to the previous editions, this tournament had 10 teams, which was the largest number since the 2011 season, and saw the return of the promotion/relegation playoffs.

== Overview ==
The First Division has 10 teams. Each team plays each other three times for a total of 27 matches in the season.

On 22 December 2016, the FAI announced that the league would be restructured into two 10-team divisions from the 2018 season onwards, one of the recommendations made in the 2015 Conroy Report.

== Teams ==
Locations of the First Division teams
Locations of Dublin First Division teams

=== Stadia and locations ===
Team	Location	Stadium
Athlone Town	Athlone	Athlone Town Stadium
Cabinteely	Cabinteely	Stradbrook Road
Cobh Ramblers	Cobh	St. Colman's Park
Drogheda United	Drogheda	United Park
Finn Harps	Ballybofey	Finn Park
Galway United	Galway	Eamonn Deacy Park
Longford Town	Longford	City Calling Stadium
Shelbourne	Drumcondra	Tolka Park
UCD	Belfield	UCD Bowl
Wexford	Crossabeg	Ferrycarrig Park

=== Personnel and kits ===
Note: Flags indicate national team as has been defined under FIFA eligibility rules. Players may hold more than one non-FIFA nationality.

Team	Manager	Captain	Kit manufacturer	Shirt sponsor
Athlone Town	(Republic of Ireland) Aaron Callaghan	(Republic of Ireland) Niall Scullion	Nike	Nitro Sports
Cabinteely	(Republic of Ireland) Pat Devlin	(Republic of Ireland) Daire Doyle	Uhlsport	Geoghegan Home Extensions
Cobh Ramblers	(Republic of Ireland) Stephen Henderson	(England) Paul Hunt	Legea	Tony & William O'Shea Fuels Rushbrooke
Drogheda United	(Republic of Ireland) Tim Clancy	(Republic of Ireland) Sean Thornton	CX+ Sport	Scotch Hall Shopping Center
Finn Harps	(Republic of Ireland) Ollie Horgan	(Republic of Ireland) Ciaran Coll	Joma	McGettigan Group
Galway United	(Republic of Ireland) Shane Keegan	(Republic of Ireland) Ryan Connolly	Uhlsport	Comer Property Management
Longford Town	(England) Neale Fenn	(Republic of Ireland) Kevin O'Connor	Legea	City Calling
Shelbourne	(Republic of Ireland) Owen Heary	(Republic of Ireland) Dean Delaney	Macron	Dublin City University
UCD	(Republic of Ireland) Collie O'Neill	(Republic of Ireland) Gary O'Neil	O'Neills	O'Neills
Wexford	(Republic of Ireland) Damian Locke	(Republic of Ireland) Craig McCabe	Bodibro	Premier Tickets

=== Managerial changes ===
Team	Outgoing manager	Manner of departure	Date of vacancy	Position in table	Incoming manager	Date of appointment
Galway United	(Republic of Ireland) Shane Keegan	Sacked	18 June 2018	6th	(Republic of Ireland) Alan Murphy	3 July 2018

== League table ==
Pos	Team	Pld	W	D	L	GF	GA	GD	Pts	Qualification
1	UCD (C, P)	27	17	6	4	59	29	+30	57	Promotion to League of Ireland Premier Division
2	Finn Harps (Q)	27	16	6	5	46	22	+24	54	Qualification for Promotion play-offs
3	Shelbourne (Q)	27	13	11	3	52	21	+31	50	Qualification for Promotion play-offs
4	Drogheda United (Q)	27	14	7	6	50	27	+23	49	Qualification for Promotion play-offs
5	Longford Town	27	13	6	8	54	36	+18	45	
6	Galway United	27	10	7	10	41	36	+5	37	
7	Cabinteely	27	9	3	15	32	45	−13	30	
8	Cobh Ramblers	27	8	5	14	24	41	−17	29	
9	Wexford	27	4	5	18	23	59	−36	17	
10	Athlone Town	27	1	4	22	16	81	−65	7	

Source: SSE Airtricity League, Soccerway
Rules for classification: 1) Points; 2) Goal difference; 3) Goals scored.
(C) Champions; (P) Promoted; (Q) Qualified for the phase indicated

== Results ==
=== Matches 1–18 ===
Teams played each other twice (once at home, once away).

Home \ Away	ATH	CAB	COB	DRO	FHA	GAL	LON	SHE	UCD	WEX
Athlone Town	—	1–2	1–4	0–1	1–1	0–3	1–1	0–5	1–3	3–0
Cabinteely	4–0	—	0–1	3–2	0–1	1–2	1–0	2–0	2–0	0–1
Cobh Ramblers	1–0	1–0	—	1–5	0–2	0–0	0–1	0–3	0–2	2–1
Drogheda United	6–0	2–0	2–1	—	2–1	2–2	1–1	1–1	2–0	2–0
Finn Harps	4–0	1–0	0–1	2–1	—	1–0	2–4	1–1	1–3	1–0
Galway United	4–1	3–1	3–0	0–1	1–2	—	0–0	1–2	2–0	4–1
Longford Town	5–1	3–0	2–2	1–0	1–2	3–2	—	1–1	0–2	3–0
Shelbourne	7–0	0–0	1–0	1–1	0–0	2–0	3–2	—	1–1	4–1
UCD	3–0	3–1	3–1	2–0	3–2	1–1	1–5	2–1	—	3–2
Wexford	7–0	0–1	1–1	1–8	1–1	0–0	0–2	0–1	0–8	—

Updated to match(es) played on 29 June 2018. Source: SSE Airtricity League
Legend: Blue = home team win; Yellow = draw; Red = away team win.

=== Matches 19–27 ===
Teams play each other once.

Home \ Away	ATH	CAB	COB	DRO	FHA	GAL	LON	SHE	UCD	WEX
Athlone Town	—	1–3	0–0	—	1–3	—	—	—	0–1	—
Cabinteely	—	—	2–0	2–2	—	—	—	1–1	—	1–2
Cobh Ramblers	—	—	—	0–2	0–1	1–2	—	—	2–2	—
Drogheda United	2–1	—	—	—	0–1	2–2	2–1	—	0–3	—
Finn Harps	—	7–1	—	—	—	2–0	3–0	0–0	—	3–0
Galway United	4–1	3–2	—	—	—	—	1–4	—	—	1–1
Longford Town	3–0	4–1	1–2	—	—	—	—	—	2–2	3–0
Shelbourne	2–2	—	3–1	0–1	—	3–0	6–1	—	—	—
UCD	—	4–1	—	—	1–1	2–0	—	1–1	—	—
Wexford	2–0	—	0–2	0–0	—	—	—	1–2	0–3	—

Updated to match(es) played on 22 September 2018. Source: SSE Airtricity League
Legend: Blue = home team win; Yellow = draw; Red = away team win.

== Top scorers ==
As of 22 September 2018

Rank	Player	Club	Goals
1	(Republic of Ireland) David O'Sullivan	Shelbourne	15
2	(Republic of Ireland) Georgie Kelly	UCD	14
3	(Republic of Ireland) Dylan McGlade	Longford Town	13
4	(Republic of Ireland) Sean Brennan	Drogheda United	11
4	(Republic of Ireland) James English	Shelbourne	11
6	(Republic of Ireland) Conor Barry	Galway United	10
7	(Republic of Ireland) Eoin McCormack	Galway United	9
7	(Republic of Ireland) Gary O'Neill	UCD	9
7	(Republic of Ireland) Mikey Place	Finn Harps	9
7	(Republic of Ireland) Sam Verdon	Longford Town	9

== Play-Offs ==
The second, third and fourth placed First Division teams played off to decide who would play Limerick, the ninth placed team from the Premier Division. The winner of this play off would play in the 2019 Premier Division.

Semi-finals

5 October 2018	Drogheda United	0–1	Shelbourne	United Park
19:45		Report	English 25'	Attendance: 900 (estimated); Referee: Ray Matthews

8 October 2018	Shelbourne	1–2 (2-4 p)	Drogheda United	Tolka Park
19:45	Evans 77'	Report	Brennan 33'; Lyons 62'	Attendance: 1281; Referee: Tomas Connolly
	Penalties
	O'Sullivan (penalty scored); Evans (penalty missed); Fitzgerald (penalty missed); Farrell (penalty scored)		(penalty scored) Lyons; (penalty scored) Brennan; (penalty scored) Gallagher; (penalty missed) McCaffrey; (penalty scored) Doyle

2–2 on aggregate. Drogheda United win on penalties.

Finals

12 October 2018	Drogheda United	1–1	Finn Harps	United Park
19:45	Kelly 13'	Report	Boyle 67'

19 October 2018	Finn Harps	2–0	Drogheda United	Finn Park
19:45	Kavanagh 18'; Boyle 67'	Report

Finn Harps win 3–1 on aggregate.

Relegation-promotion match

29 October 2018	Finn Harps	1–0	Limerick	Finn Park
19:45 GMT	McCourt 35' (pen.)	Report		Attendance: 2,379; Referee: Robert Harvey

2 November 2018	Limerick	0–2	Finn Harps	Markets Field
19:45 GMT		Report	Timlin 45+1'; Boyle 80'	Referee: Graham Kelly

Finn Harps won 3–0 on aggregate and were promoted to 2019 Premier Division. Limerick were relegated to the 2019 First Division.

== See also ==
- 2018 League of Ireland Premier Division
- 2018 League of Ireland Cup
