= Alan Reynolds (footballer) =

Irish footballer & coach

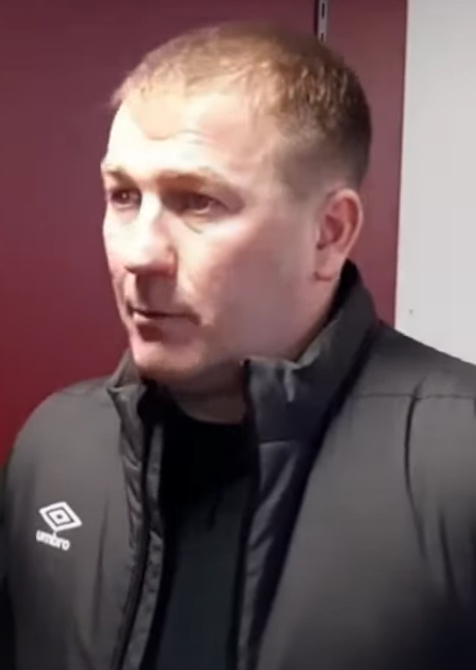
- Reynolds in 2020

Personal information
- Date of birth: 12 June 1974 (age 52)
- Place of birth: Tramore, Ireland
- Position: Midfielder

Team information
- Current team: Bohemians (manager)

Senior career*
Years	Team	Apps	(Gls)
1991–2001	Waterford United	193	(6)
2001–2002	Longford Town	27	(1)
2002–2003	Cork City	23	(0)
2003	Shamrock Rovers	23	(0)
2004–2005	Waterford United	35	(0)
2005–2006	Shelbourne	11	(0)
2006–2007	Waterford United	17	(0)
2007	Shamrock Rovers	7	(0)
Total		336	(7)

Managerial career
- 2004–2005: Waterford (player-manager)
- 2008: Derry City (Assistant manager)
- 2014–2015: St Patrick's Athletic (Assistant manager)
- 2016: Cork City (Assistant manager)
- 2017–2020: Waterford
- 2020: Dundalk (Assistant manager)
- 2020: Dundalk (Interim manager)
- 2021–2024: Republic of Ireland U21 (Assistant manager)
- 2021: Shelbourne (Assistant manager)
- 2022–2023: Derry City (Assistant manager)
- 2023–2024: Waterford (Assistant manager)
- 2024–: Bohemians
- * Club domestic league appearances and goals as of 10 September 2025

Alan Reynolds (born 12 June 1974) is an Irish football coach and former player who is the manager of Bohemians in the League of Ireland Premier Division. He has also previously worked as a Football In Community Development Officer for the Football Association of Ireland.

== Playing career ==
=== Waterford United ===
He made his League of Ireland debut on 1 December 1991 for his hometown club Waterford United under the stewardship of Alfie Hale. His first goal for the Blues came on 21 November 1993.

=== Longford Town ===
After ten seasons he transferred to Longford Town for one season.

=== Cork City ===
He then signed for Cork City where he again spent only one season.

=== Shamrock Rovers ===
Reynolds then joined Shamrock Rovers. He made his debut on 11 April 2003 against Drogheda United In his first season in the Hoops he played in four European games, including the famous UEFA Intertoto Cup win in Poland over Odra Wodzisław.

=== Player/Manager at Waterford ===
In March 2004 he was appointed player-manager at Waterford United with Paul McGrath as Director of Football. The Blues reached the FAI Cup Final in his first season before disastrously losing the game in the last five minutes.

=== Shelbourne ===
He resigned in March 2005 before joining Shelbourne making his debut in August and winning the League that season.

=== Rejoining Waterford ===
In July 2006 he rejoined Waterford United. He left the club exactly one year later in July 2007.

=== Rovers return ===
He made his second debut for Rovers on 6 July 2007 at Longford. In total he made a combined total of 40 appearances without scoring in his two spells at Rovers.

== Management/Coaching Career ==
=== Derry City assistant ===
On 10 January 2008, Reynolds was appointed Assistant Head Coach at Derry City.

=== St Patrick's Athletic assistant ===
In 2014 Reynolds Joined Liam Buckley's coaching staff at St Patrick's Athletic. His spell with the club seen them win the FAI Cup in 2014 with a 2–0 win over Derry City and the EA Sports Cup in 2015 with a win over Galway United on penalties.

=== Cork City assistant ===
On 30 January 2016, Reynolds was appointed Assistant First Team Coach of Cork City. He spent one season at Turners Cross before leaving for his native Waterford. He helped the rebels in a win over Dundalk at the FAI Cup with a 1–0; he had just place after the same team in the Premier Division.

=== Return to Waterford ===
Again, Reynolds was appointed as Waterford manager on 2 January 2017, working alongside Director of Football Pat Fenlon. He was given the allowance to sign some top League of Ireland players such as Kenny Browne, Paul Keegan and Mark O'Sullivan to name a few. The side achieved promotion at first opportunity, Waterfords 3–0 win over Wexford coupled with nearest challengers Cobh Ramblers 3–0 defeat to Cabinteely secured the First Division title with two games to spare and for the first time in ten years his hometown side were in the League of Ireland Premier Division due to his guidance.

In the 2018 season, Reynolds guided Waterford to fourth position in the League of Ireland Premier Division.

=== Dundalk assistant ===
In late June 2020, Reynolds was named assistant manager at Dundalk after Waterford laid off their entire squad through E-Mail during the COVID-19 pandemic. Upon the sacking of manager Vinny Perth, Reynolds alongside John Gill acted as interim managers of the club for a 3–1 defeat to Sligo Rovers on 22 August 2020.

=== Republic of Ireland U21 assistant ===
In July 2021 Reynolds was named as assistant manager of the Reoublic of Ireland U21 team under manager Jim Crawford. On 5 August 2024, Reynolds departed his post as assistant manager, following criticism from Bohemians fans that he was not fully committed to his post as Bohs manager.

=== Shelbourne assistant ===
Reynolds was appointed assistant with Shelbourne ahead of the 2021 League of Ireland First Division season, while also remaining Republic of Ireland U21 assistant. After helping guide Shels to promotion by winning the 2021 League of Ireland First Division, Reynolds left the club when manager Ian Morris left at the end of the season.

=== Derry City assistant ===
Reynolds was named as assistant manager of Derry City in December 2021, working under manager Ruaidhrí Higgins, combining the role with his Republic of Ireland U21 role. In October 2022, he turned down an offer to become manager of Bohemians.

=== Waterford ===
In April 2023, it was announced that Reynolds had left Derry to return home to Waterford, where he would become assistant to new Waterford manager Keith Long.

=== Bohemians ===
Reynolds was appointed manager of Bohemians in March 2024. He drew criticism from Bohs fans following a 2–1 defeat at home to Derry City on 13 June 2024, for missing the preparation for the game by spending a week in Croatia with the Republic of Ireland U21 side as part of his role as assistant manager, when it emerged that he was remaining on in that role alongside his club commitments. He then stepped down from his Ireland U21 assistant manager role on 5 August 2024. In September 2025, he signed a new contract with the club until the end of the 2027 season.

=== Managerial statistics ===
As of match played 30 October 2026

Managerial record by team and tenure
Team	From	To	Record							
Team	From	To	G	W	D	L	GF	GA	GD	Win %
(Republic of Ireland) Waterford	1 March 2004	19 June 2005	57	23	11	23	73	78	−5	40.35
(Republic of Ireland) Waterford	2 January 2017	16 June 2020	122	59	19	44	182	149	+33	48.36
(Republic of Ireland) Dundalk (interim manager)	21 August 2020	2 September 2020	1	0	0	1	1	3	−2	0.00
(Republic of Ireland) Bohemians	26 March 2024	Present	125	53	28	44	188	147	+41	42.40
Total			305	135	58	112	444	377	+67	44.26

== Honours ==
=== Player ===
Waterford United

- League of Ireland First Division (2): 1989–90, 1997–98

Shelbourne

- League of Ireland Premier Division (1): 2006

=== Manager/Coach ===
St Patrick's Athletic

- FAI Cup (1): 2014
- League of Ireland Cup (1): 2015

Cork City

- FAI Cup (1): 2016

Waterford

- League of Ireland First Division (1): 2017

Shelbourne

- League of Ireland First Division (1): 2021

Derry City

- FAI Cup (1): 2022

== Footnotes and references ==
Footnotes:
