= Nathan Boyle =

Association football player from Northern Ireland

Personal information
- Date of birth: 14 April 1994 (age 32)
- Place of birth: Derry, Northern Ireland
- Position: Forward

Team information
- Current team: Finn Harps
- Number: 21

Youth career
- 2013–2014: Derry City

Senior career*
Years	Team	Apps	(Gls)
2014–2018	Derry City	75	(10)
2015	→ Finn Harps (loan)	12	(5)
2018–2019	Finn Harps	40	(11)
- * Club domestic league appearances and goals as of 10:13, 27 November 2019 (UTC)

Nathan Boyle (born 14 April 1994) is a football striker who plays for Finn Harps in the League of Ireland.

== Career ==
Boyle broke into the Derry side during the 2014 season and went on to make 10 appearances that season.

Derry City loaned Boyle to Finn Harps in early 2015, where he made his debut as a substitute late in the second half in a 1–0 win over Cabinteely. The next fixture saw him make his first start for Harps, scoring twice in an away win over Waterford United.

When with Harps he helped the club gain promotion to the premier league. Despite suffering hamstring issues in the later half of the season, he had scored a total of 5 goals for Harps during his loan period.

Derry then recalled him back into their first team at the end of 2015, in time for the 2016 season.

After his return, Boyle scored his first goals for Derry, coming on as a substitute, scoring the matchwinner with his second goal, in a victory over Galway in March 2016. The following month in a victory over Sligo Rovers, Boyle scored both Derry's goals, to put Derry through to the EA Sports Cup quarter-finals.
