= 2021 League of Ireland First Division =

37th edition of the 2nd tier competition in association football in Ireland

League of Ireland First Division
- Season: 2021
- Dates: 26 March 2021 – 29 October 2021
- Champions: Shelbourne (2nd title)
- Promoted: Shelbourne, UCD
- Matches: 135
- Goals: 366 (2.71 per match)
- Top goalscorer: Colm Whelan (18 league goals + 3 playoff goals)
- Biggest home win: UCD 6-0 Galway United (13 August 2021)
- Biggest away win: Wexford 0–6 UCD (30 April 2021)
- Highest scoring: Wexford 4-4 Athlone (21 July 2021)
- All statistics correct as of 30 October 2021.

The 2021 League of Ireland First Division season was the 37th season of the League of Ireland First Division, the second tier of Ireland's association football league. The fixture list was released on 8 February 2021 and the competition commenced on 26 March 2021. Shelbourne were confirmed Champions and promoted to the League of Ireland Premier Division on 1 October 2021.

== Overview ==
The First Division has 10 teams. Each team plays each other three times for a total of 27 matches in the season.

== Teams ==
Locations of the First Division teams
Locations of Dublin First Division teams

=== Team changes ===
Shelbourne and Cork City joined following their relegation from the Premier League at the end of the 2020 season. Drogheda United and Longford Town departed following their promotion from the 2020 First Division.

=== Additional teams ===
On 10 November 2020 a newly formed Limerick based club Treaty United announced that they would apply for a 2021 League of Ireland licence. Former Dublin based League of Ireland club St Francis FC and Wexford based Yola FC also both expressed interest in joining for 2021 by the deadline for expressions of interest which was 10 November 2020. An application was made by a brand new entity under the name Dublin County F.C. but did not ultimately materialise. Bray Wanderers and Cabinteely F.C. merged at the end of the season, keeping the name Bray Wanderers.

=== Stadia and locations ===
Team	Location	Stadium	Capacity
Athlone Town	Athlone	Athlone Town Stadium	5,000
Bray Wanderers	Bray	Carlisle Grounds	4,000
Cabinteely	Dublin (Cabinteely)	Stradbrook Road	1,620
Cobh Ramblers	Cobh	St. Colman's Park	3,000
Cork City	Cork	Turners Cross	7,845
Galway United	Galway	Eamonn Deacy Park	5,000
Shelbourne	Dublin (Drumcondra)	Tolka Park	3,700
Treaty United	Limerick	Markets Field	5,000
UCD	Dublin (Belfield)	UCD Bowl	3,000
Wexford	Crossabeg	Ferrycarrig Park	2,500

=== Personnel and kits ===
Note: Flags indicate national team as has been defined under FIFA eligibility rules. Players may hold more than one non-FIFA nationality.

Team	Manager	Captain	Kit manufacturer	Shirt sponsor
Athlone Town	(Republic of Ireland) Paul Doolin	(Republic of Ireland) Kurtis Byrne	Nike	Hayden & Co. Solicitors
Bray Wanderers	(Republic of Ireland) Gary Cronin	(Republic of Ireland) Aaron Barry	Umbro	Matt Britton Carpets
Cabinteely	(Republic of Ireland) Pat Devlin	(Republic of Ireland) Daniel Blackbyrne	Nike	Edufit
Cobh Ramblers	(Republic of Ireland) Darren Murphy (interim)	(Republic of Ireland) John Kavanagh	Joma	Metropole Hotel
Cork City	(Republic of Ireland) Colin Healy	(Republic of Ireland) Gearoid Morrissey	Adidas	University College Cork
Galway United	(Republic of Ireland) John Caulfield	(Republic of Ireland) Conor McCormack	O'Neill's	Comer Property Management
Shelbourne	(Republic of Ireland) Ian Morris	(Republic of Ireland) Luke Byrne	Umbro	Hamptons Homes
Treaty United	(Republic of Ireland) Tommy Barrett	(Republic of Ireland) Jack Lynch	Umbro	UPMC
UCD	(Republic of Ireland) Andy Myler	(Republic of Ireland) Jack Keaney	O'Neill's	O'Neill's
Wexford	(Republic of Ireland) Ian Ryan	(Republic of Ireland) Karl Manahan	Bodibro	Wallace's Asti

=== Managerial changes ===
Team	Outgoing manager	Manner of departure	Date of vacancy	Position in table	Incoming manager	Date of appointment
Wexford	(Republic of Ireland) Brian O'Sullivan	Mutual Consent	10 May 2021	10th	(Republic of Ireland) Ian Ryan	15 May 2021
Cobh Ramblers	(Republic of Ireland) Stuart Ashton	Sacked	22 July 2021	9th	(Republic of Ireland) Darren Murphy (interim)	23 July 2021
Athlone Town	(Republic of Ireland) Adrian Carberry	Sacked	17 August 2021	6th	(Republic of Ireland) Paul Doolin	18 August 2021
Shelbourne	(Republic of Ireland) Ian Morris	Mutual Consent	29 October 2021	1st	(Republic of Ireland) Damien Duff	3 November 2021

== League table ==
Pos	Team	Pld	W	D	L	GF	GA	GD	Pts	Qualification
1	Shelbourne (C, P)	27	16	9	2	49	23	+26	57	Promotion to League of Ireland Premier Division
2	Galway United	27	15	6	6	39	25	+14	51	Qualification for Promotion play-offs
3	UCD (O, P)	27	13	7	7	55	38	+17	46	Qualification for Promotion play-offs
4	Treaty United	27	11	9	7	36	27	+9	42	Qualification for Promotion play-offs
5	Bray Wanderers	27	9	10	8	36	31	+5	37	Qualification for Promotion play-offs
6	Cork City	27	8	9	10	37	28	+9	33	
7	Athlone Town	27	9	6	12	32	43	−11	33	
8	Cobh Ramblers	27	8	4	15	25	46	−21	28	
9	Cabinteely	27	8	1	18	26	47	−21	25	
10	Wexford	27	6	3	18	29	56	−27	21	

Source: sseairtricityleague, Soccerway
Rules for classification: 1) Points; 2) Goal difference; 3) Goals scored
(C) Champions; (O) Play-off winners; (P) Promoted

== Results ==
=== Matches 1–18 ===
Teams play each other twice (once at home, once away).

Home \ Away	ATH	BRW	CAB	COB	COR	GAL	SHE	TRU	UCD	WEX
Athlone Town	—	0–0	1–2	2–1	0–2	3–1	1–3	1–4	2–3	3–0
Bray Wanderers	1–2	—	3–0	2–1	0–0	0–0	1–4	0–0	4–0	3–1
Cabinteely	0–1	0–3	—	1–0	1–0	0–3 (Note: Cabinteely v Galway Utd postponed on 9 April 2021 (Galway awarded a 3–0 victory by FAI))	1–3	2–1	1–2	0–2
Cobh Ramblers	0–0	1–1	1–0	—	1–0	0–4	1–2	0–2	0–4	3–2
Cork City	0–1	2–2	0–2	2–1	—	1–1	1–3	2–3	1–1	5–0
Galway United	2–1	1–2	1–0	2–0	2–3	—	0–0	1–1	2–2	1–0
Shelbourne	1–0	3–3	1–0	2–2	2–1	4–0	—	2–2	3–1	1–0
Treaty United	1–0	2–0	1–4	1–1	2–1	0–1	1–1	—	2–1	1–0
UCD	2–2	0–0	4–1	1–2	0–0	0–2	0–0	3–2	—	2–1
Wexford	4–4	0–1	2–3	1–2	0–0	1–3	0–1	1–2	0–6	—

Updated to match(es) played on 7 August 2021. Source: SSE Airtricity League
Legend: Blue = home team win; Yellow = draw; Red = away team win.

=== Matches 19-27 ===
Home \ Away	ATH	BRW	CAB	COB	COR	GAL	SHE	TRU	UCD	WEX
Athlone Town	—	—	2–1	1–2	—	1–0	—	—	—	0–2
Bray Wanderers	0–1	—	1–2	—	0–0	—	—	1–0	—	—
Cabinteely	—	—	—	1–2	2–2	0–1	0–2	0–2	—	—
Cobh Ramblers	—	1–2	—	—	—	0–1	2–0	—	0–2	—
Cork City	3–1	—	—	4–0	—	3–0	0–2	—	—	4–0
Galway United	—	1–0	—	—	—	—	3–1	0–0	4–1	2–1
Shelbourne	1–1	1–1	—	—	—	—	—	1–0	1–1	4–0
Treaty United	1–1	—	—	3–0	0–0	—	—	—	—	1–1
UCD	6–0	4–3	5–2	—	1–0	—	—	2–1	—	—
Wexford	—	4–2	2–1	3–1	—	—	—	—	2–1	—

Updated to match(es) played on 29 October 2021. Source: SSE Airtricity League
Legend: Blue = home team win; Yellow = draw; Red = away team win.

== Season statistics ==
=== Top scorers ===
Source: https://www.sseairtricityleague.ie

As of matches played 29 October 2021.

Rank	Player	Club	Goals
1	(Republic of Ireland) Colm Whelan	UCD	19
2	(Republic of Ireland) Ryan Brennan	Shelbourne	15
3	(Republic of Ireland) Liam Kerrigan	UCD	12
4	(Republic of Ireland) Cian Murphy	Cork City	11
5	(Republic of Ireland) Kyle Robinson	Wexford	9
5	(Republic of Ireland) Ruairí Keating	Galway United	9

== Play-offs ==
=== First Division play-off Semi-finals ===
==== First leg ====
3 November 2021	Bray Wanderers	0–0	Galway United	Carlisle Grounds
19:45 IST		Report

3 November 2021	Treaty United	0–3	UCD	Markets Field
19:45 IST		Report	Paul Doyle 34'; Colm Whelan 79', 92'

==== Second leg ====
7 November 2021	Galway United	0–1 (0–1 agg.)	Bray Wanderers	Eamonn Deacy Park
17:00 IST		Report	Brandon Kavanagh 22'	Referee: Kevin O’Sullivan

7 November 2021	UCD	1–2 (4–2 agg.)	Treaty United	UCD Bowl
17:00 IST	Adam Verdon 67'	Report	Conor Melody 8'; Anthony O’Donnell 52'	Referee: Alan Patchell

=== First Division play-off Final ===
19 November 2021	Bray Wanderers	0–2	UCD	Dalymount Park
19:45 IST		Report	Colm Whelan 68'; Paul Doyle 86'	Referee: Oliver Moran

=== Promotion/relegation play-off ===
26 November 2021	Waterford	1–2	UCD	Richmond Park
19:45 IST	Anthony Wordsworth 5'; Niall O'Keeffe (yellow card) 87' (yellow-red card)	Report	Dara Keane 26'; Colm Whelan 34'	Referee: Paul McLaughlin

== See also ==
- 2021 League of Ireland Premier Division
- 2021 FAI Cup
