= Jordi Balk =

Dutch footballer (born 1994)

Personal information
- Full name: Jordi Balk
- Date of birth: 26 April 1994 (age 32)
- Place of birth: Cothen, Netherlands
- Height: 1.93 m (6 ft 4 in)
- Position: Centre back

Team information
- Current team: SVL Langbroek

Youth career
- SVF Cothen
- SV Houten
- FC Utrecht

Senior career*
Years	Team	Apps	(Gls)
2014	Ross County	4	(0)
2015–2017	FC Oss	68	(1)
2017	St Patrick's Athletic	12	(1)
2018	Lienden	28	(0)
2019	DUNO	8	(0)
2019–2020	DOVO	19	(0)
2020–2022	Sportlust '46	16	(0)
- * Club domestic league appearances and goals as of 23:51, 30 January 2023 (UTC)

Jordi Balk (born 26 April 1994) is a Dutch retired professional footballer who played as a centre back for Ross County, FC Oss, St Patrick's Athletic, FC Lienden, VV DUNO, DOVO and Sportlust '46.

== Club career ==
=== Ross County ===
Balk, who had previously played in the youth academy of Dutch club Utrecht, signed for Scottish Premiership club Ross County in July 2014. He made his debut appearance on 16 August 2014, in a 2–1 defeat against Kilmarnock. Balk was released from his contract in November 2014.

=== FC Oss ===
In January 2015, he signed with Dutch Eerste Divisie side FC Oss until the end of the season. He stayed with FC Oss until 2017.

=== St Patrick's Athletic ===
After 3 seasons with FC Oss, Balk went on trial with League of Ireland Premier Division club St Patrick's Athletic, from the capital city of Dublin. On 5 July 2017 he played the full 90 minutes as a trialist in a 1–0 friendly win over Scottish Premiership side Heart of Midlothian at Richmond Park. After impressing fans and coaching staff with his passing, positional sense and tackling, Balk signed a contract with the Saints on 7 July 2017, becoming the first Dutch player to play for the club. Balk made his full debut on 9 July in a narrow 1–0 defeat away to league leaders Cork City. He scored his first goal in the clubs crucial 4–2 win against Cork which helped St Pats stay in League of Ireland Premier Division.

=== Return to Holland ===
On 19 December, Balk announced to his fans via his Instagram account that despite St Patrick's Athletic offering him a multi-year contract, he would be leaving Dublin and returning home to sign for FC Lienden of the Tweede Divisie on a 1.5 year contract.

Balk signed with Voetbalvereniging Duno Doorwerth, better known as VV DUNO, in the beginning of 2019. However, already on 12 February 2019 it was confirmed, that Balk would join DOVO from the upcoming season.

Balk played for Sportlust '46 from 2020 until he retired from football in July 2022.

On 9 September 2023, Balk returned to Dublin to play in a friendly for a St Patrick's Athletic legends team for Ian Bermingham's testimonial match.

He started working as a personal fitness trainer but in 2025 he started playing again for amateur side SVL Langbroek.

== Career statistics ==
As of 19 December 2017.

Appearances and goals by club, season and competition
Club	Season	League			Cup		League Cup		Other		Total	
Club	Season	Division	Apps	Goals	Apps	Goals	Apps	Goals	Apps	Goals	Apps	Goals
Ross County	2014–15	Scottish Premiership	4	0	0	0	1	0	–	–	5	0
FC Oss	2014–15	Eerste Divisie	18	0	0	0	0	0	2 (Note: Appearances in Promotion Play-offs)	0	20	0
FC Oss	2015–16	Eerste Divisie	33	0	0	0	–	–	–	–	33	0
FC Oss	2016–17	Eerste Divisie	17	1	0	0	–	–	–	–	17	1
FC Oss	Club Total		68	1	0	0	–	–	2	0	70	1
St Patrick's Athletic	2017	League of Ireland Premier Division	12	1	2	0	0	0	0	0	14	1
FC Lienden	2017–18	Tweede Divisie	0	0	0	0	0	0	0	0	0	0
Career total			84	2	2	0	1	0	2	0	89	2
