= Barry Murphy (footballer, born 1985) =

Irish association footballer, born 1985

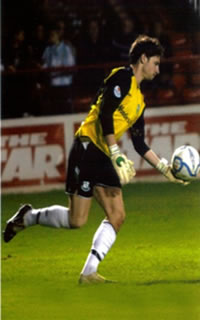

Personal information
- Date of birth: 12 June 1985 (age 41)
- Place of birth: Dublin, Ireland
- Height: 1.78 m (5 ft 10 in)
- Position: Goalkeeper

Youth career
- 1996–2002: Leicester Celtic
- 2002–2004: Shamrock Rovers

Senior career*
Years	Team	Apps	(Gls)
2004–2009	Shamrock Rovers	151	(0)
2010–2011	Bohemians	44	(0)
2012	St Patrick's Athletic	11	(0)
2013–2016	Shamrock Rovers	83	(0)
2017–2019	St Patrick's Athletic	31	(0)
2021	St Patrick's Athletic	1	(0)

International career
2007–2008	Republic of Ireland U23	3	(0)
2011	League of Ireland XI	1	(0)
- * Club domestic league appearances and goals as of 19:57, 22 December 2022 (UTC)

Barry Murphy (born 8 June 1985) is an Irish former professional footballer who played as a goalkeeper in the League of Ireland Premier Division for Shamrock Rovers over 2 spells, Bohemians and St Patrick's Athletic over 3 spells.

== Club career ==
=== Shamrock Rovers ===
He made his League of Ireland debut on 20 May 2005, keeping a clean sheet against Waterford, after the departure of Russell Payne. Having come through the club's youth system in 2004, where he was U21 Player of the Year, he made rapid progress to become the club's Young Player of the Year and Player of the Year for 2005.

He played a total of 25 league games in his first season keeping seven clean sheets. Murphy kept 24 clean sheets from 35 games during the 2006 campaign as Rovers won the First Division.

He made his 100th competitive appearance for The Hoops on 2 October 2007 at Bray Wanderers where for the first time in his Rovers career, he was not only booked but sent off.

For the 2007 season he kept 16 clean sheets in 29 league games as Rovers finished fifth in the league.

Midway through the 2009 season, Murphy was dropped as first choice goalkeeper by Michael O'Neill and replaced by new signing, Alan Mannus who held on to the position for the remainder of the campaign.

=== Bohemians ===
Having reportedly turned down a new contract at Shamrock Rovers, no press release confirming his departure was ever issued by the club, Murphy reportedly signed for rivals, Bohemians in time for the start of the 2010 League of Ireland season. It was confirmed on 6 February 2010 that Bohemians' transfer embargo had been lifted, and Barry Murphy was officially registered with the club. He was unveiled to the Bohemians fans in a pre-season friendly against Athlone Town, and made his league debut for Bohs at home to Sporting Fingal on 5 March.

He made his European debut and kept a clean sheet when Bohemians beat The New Saints F.C. 1–0 in the 2010–11 UEFA Champions League qualifiers. However the following week Bohs were humiliated 4–0 in one of the worst results in the League's history.

Murphy spent the first half of the season as first choice goalkeeper for Pat Fenlon's side but lost his place midway through the season after some poor performances. When Chris O'Connor was suspended towards the end of the season, Murphy regained his place and put in some man of the match performances, most notably against St. Patrick's Athletic on 9 October. Unfortunately for Murphy and Bohs, they would lose the league title on goal difference.

This qualified them for the 2011–12 UEFA Europa League qualifiers where they played NK Olimpija Ljubljana (2005). Murphy playing in both legs as Bohs were eliminated.

=== St Patrick's Athletic ===
On 4 January 2012, it was confirmed that Murphy had signed for St Patrick's Athletic for the 2012 season. Murphy kept his first clean sheet in a competitive game in a 4–0 win against Phoenix at Richmond Park.

However, he lost his place to Brendan Clarke who appeared in all of the Inchicore sides six 2012–13 UEFA Europa League games and the 2012 FAI Cup final.

=== Return to Shamrock Rovers ===
Murphy re-joined The Hoops on 29 November 2012.

=== Return to Pats ===
It was announced that Murphy had returned to St Patrick's Athletic for the 2017 season on 9 January 2017 alongside Kurtis Byrne of Bohemians and Alex O'Hanlon from Liverpool. After a year out of football, Murphy returned to St Patrick's Athletic for a third spell with the club on 11 March 2021, ahead of the 2021 season where his fellow goalkeepers were 19 year old Liverpool loanee Vítězslav Jaroš and 17 year old Josh Keeley. With Jaros on international duty with the Czech Republic U21 side, Murphy made his first appearance since 2019 on 3 September 2021 in a 3–2 win over Longford Town at Richmond Park. On 28 November 2021 Murphy was an unused substitute in the 2021 FAI Cup final, as his side defeated rivals Bohemians 4–3 on penalties following a 1–1 draw after extra time in front of a record FAI Cup Final crowd of 37,126 at the Aviva Stadium.

In 2023 Murphy announced his retirement from football. On 9 September 2023, Murphy returned to play in a friendly for a St. Patrick's Athletic legends team for Ian Bermingham's testimonial match.

== International ==
Murphy made his Ireland U23 debut in November 2007 and also kept a clean sheet in his second appearance. He then made his third appearance for the U23s in October 2008 against Belgium.

== Honours ==
=== Club ===
Shamrock Rovers

- League of Ireland First Division: 2006
- Setanta Sports Cup: 2013
- Leinster Senior Cup: 2013
- League Cup: 2013

Bohemians

- Setanta Sports Cup: 2009–10

St Patrick's Athletic

- Leinster Senior Cup: 2019
- FAI Cup: 2021

=== Individual ===
- Shamrock Rovers Player of the Year: 2005, 2013
- Shamrock Rovers Young Player of the Year: 2005
