= 2017 St Patrick's Athletic F.C. season =

St Patrick's Athletic F.C.
2017 season
- Chairman: Garrett Kelleher
- Coach: Liam Buckley
- Stadium: Richmond Park, Inchicore, Dublin 8
- League of Ireland: 8th
- FAI Cup: Second Round (Eliminated by Galway United)
- EA Sports Cup: Quarter Final (Eliminated by Cork City)
- Leinster Senior Cup: Semi Final (Eliminated by Shelbourne)
- Top goalscorer: League: Kurtis Byrne (10 goals); All: Kurtis Byrne (10 goals); Christy Fagan (10 goals)
- Highest home attendance: 2,361 Shamrock Rovers (26 September)
- Lowest home attendance: 350 (Est.) vs Firhouse Clover (8 August)
Home colours	Away colours	Third colours

The 2017 season was St. Patrick's Athletic F.C.'s 88th year in existence and was the Supersaint's 66th consecutive season in the top-flight of Irish football. It was the sixth year that Liam Buckley is the team's manager (in his current spell), following replacing Pete Mahon in December 2011. With the new change to the League of Ireland structure, 3 clubs were set to be relegated from the Premier Division, which has created an intense relegation between many clubs, including Pats' due to their lower budget than previous years following a poor 2016 season in which they finished 7th in the league, making 2017 the first year in 7 years without European football. The relegation battle went right down to the last day of the season, where Pat's secured the necessary point to stay up following a 1–1 draw away to Derry City.

== Squad ==
No.	Name	Position(s)	Nationality	Hometown	Date of birth (age)	Previous club	Year signed	Club Apps.	Club Goals
Goalkeepers
1	Conor O'Malley	GK	(Republic of Ireland)	Westport, County Mayo	1 August 1994 (age 31)	(Republic of Ireland) Shamrock Rovers B	2015	48	0
1	Łukasz Skowron	GK	(Poland)	(Poland) Sierpc, Masovian Voivodeship	17 March 1991 (age 35)	(Portugal) Olhanense	2017	8	0
16	Barry Murphy	GK	(Republic of Ireland)	Tallaght, Dublin	8 June 1985 (age 41)	(Republic of Ireland) Shamrock Rovers	2017	31	0
25	Pat Jennings	GK	(England)	(England) Watford, Hertfordshire	24 September 1979 (age 46)	(Republic of Ireland) Athlone Town	2013	5	0
Defenders
2	Michael Barker	RB/LB	(Republic of Ireland)	County Dublin	16 August 1993 (age 32)	(Republic of Ireland) Bray Wanderers	2016	56	2
3	Ian Bermingham (Captain)	LB	(Republic of Ireland)	Ballyfermot, Dublin	6 June 1989 (age 37)	(Republic of Ireland) Shamrock Rovers	2010	317	13
4	Gavin Peers	CB	(Republic of Ireland)	Dublin 18, Dublin	10 November 1985 (age 40)	(Republic of Ireland) Sligo Rovers	2017	22	0
5	Darren Dennehy	CB	(Republic of Ireland)	Tralee, County Kerry	21 September 1988 (age 37)	(Republic of Ireland) Cork City	2016	36	2
12	Lee Desmond	CB/CDM/LB	(Republic of Ireland)	Donaghmede, Dublin	22 January 1995 (age 31)	(Republic of Ireland) Shelbourne	2015	97	0
13	Rory Feely	CB	(Republic of Ireland)	Athy, County Kildare	3 January 1997 (age 29)	(Republic of Ireland) St Patrick's Athletic Under 19's	2014	42	2
15	Jordi Balk	CB	(Netherlands)	(Netherlands) Cothen, Utrecht	26 April 1994 (age 32)	(Netherlands) FC Oss	2017	14	0
17	Ciaran Kelly	LB	(Republic of Ireland)	Lucan, County Dublin	4 July 1998 (age 28)	(Republic of Ireland) St Patrick's Athletic Under 19's	2016	3	0
22	Ger O'Brien	RB	(Republic of Ireland)	Inchicore, Dublin	2 June 1984 (age 42)	(Republic of Ireland) Bohemians	2012	187	2
Midfielders
6	Pat Cregg	CDM/CM	(Republic of Ireland)	Blanchardstown, Dublin	21 February 1986 (age 40)	(Republic of Ireland) Shamrock Rovers	2017	17	0
6	Owen Garvan	CM/CDM	(Republic of Ireland)	Dublin	29 January 1988 (age 38)	(England) Colchester United	2017	10	0
7	Conan Byrne	RW	(Republic of Ireland)	Swords, County Dublin	10 August 1985 (age 40)	(Republic of Ireland) Shelbourne	2013	214	69
8	Graham Kelly	CM/CDM/CAM	(Republic of Ireland)	Whitechurch, Dublin	31 October 1991 (age 34)	(Republic of Ireland) Bray Wanderers	2016	75	9
10	Sam Verdon	CM/CAM	(Republic of Ireland)	Kilbarrack, Dublin	3 September 1995 (age 30)	(Republic of Ireland) St Patrick's Athletic Under 19's	2013	54	6
10	Killian Brennan	CAM/CM/CDM	(Republic of Ireland)	Drogheda, County Louth	31 January 1984 (age 42)	(Republic of Ireland) Drogheda United	2017	121	21
11	Jonathan Lunney	CAM/CM/LB	(Republic of Ireland)	Swords, County Dublin	2 February 1998 (age 28)	(Republic of Ireland) St Patrick's Athletic Under 19's	2016	32	1
14	Darragh Markey	CAM	(Republic of Ireland)	Lucan, County Dublin	23 May 1997 (age 29)	(Republic of Ireland) St Patrick's Athletic Under 19's	2015	39	0
15	Jack Bayly	CM/CAM	(Republic of Ireland)	Celbridge, County Kildare	18 June 1996 (age 30)	(Republic of Ireland) St Patrick's Athletic Under 19's	2013	14	3
19	Steven Grogan	CAM	(Republic of Ireland)	Clondalkin, Dublin	21 July 1997 (age 29)	(Republic of Ireland) St Patrick's Athletic Under 19's	2016	2	0
20	Billy Dennehy	LW	(Republic of Ireland)	Tralee, County Kerry	17 February 1987 (age 39)	(Republic of Ireland) Cork City	2016	65	12
21	Paul O'Conor	CDM/CM	(Republic of Ireland)	Dublin	10 August 1987 (age 38)	(Republic of Ireland) Limerick	2017	9	2
23	Alex O'Hanlon	CAM/LW	(Republic of Ireland)	Blanchardstown, Dublin	24 April 1996 (age 30)	(England) Liverpool	2017	23	3
29	Ian Turner	RW/RB	(Republic of Ireland)	Wilton, Cork	19 April 1989 (age 37)	(Republic of Ireland) Limerick	2017	9	0
	Jamie Lennon	CAM	(Republic of Ireland)	Santry, Dublin	9 May 1998 (age 28)	(Republic of Ireland) St Patrick's Athletic Under 19's	2017	2	1
	Cian Hughes	CAM	(Republic of Ireland)	Dublin	7 March 2000 (age 26)	(Republic of Ireland) St Patrick's Athletic Under 17's	2017	1	0
	Richie O'Farrell	CM	(Republic of Ireland)	Dublin	18 September 2000 (age 25)	(Republic of Ireland) St Patrick's Athletic Under 17's	2017	1	0
Forwards
9	Christy Fagan	ST	(Republic of Ireland)	Smithfield, Dublin	11 May 1989 (age 37)	(Republic of Ireland) Bohemians	2012	212	90
18	Kurtis Byrne	ST/LW/CAM	(Republic of Ireland)	Tallaght, Dublin	9 April 1990 (age 36)	(Republic of Ireland) Bohemians	2017	36	10
24	Aidan Keena	ST	(Republic of Ireland)	Mullingar, County Westmeath	25 April 1999 (age 27)	(Republic of Ireland) St Patrick's Athletic Under 19's	2017	5	0
26	Josh O'Hanlon	ST	(Republic of Ireland)	Santry, Dublin	25 September 1995 (age 30)	(England) Newport County	2017	26	2
	Jake Walker	ST	(Republic of Ireland)	Clondalkin, Dublin	19 August 2000 (age 25)	(Republic of Ireland) St Patrick's Athletic Under 17's	2017	1	0

=== Transfers ===
==== In ====
Player	Country	Position	Signed from
Gavin Peers	(Republic of Ireland)	Defender	(Republic of Ireland) Sligo Rovers
Pat Cregg	(Republic of Ireland)	Midfielder	(Republic of Ireland) Shamrock Rovers
Barry Murphy	(Republic of Ireland)	Goalkeeper	(Republic of Ireland) Shamrock Rovers
Kurtis Byrne	(Republic of Ireland)	Forward	(Republic of Ireland) Bohemians
Alex O'Hanlon	(Republic of Ireland)	Midfielder	(England) Liverpool
Josh O'Hanlon	(Republic of Ireland)	Forward	(England) Newport County

==== Out ====
Player	Country	Position	Sold To
Steven Kinsella	(Republic of Ireland)	Midfielder	(England) Everton (end of loan)
Mark Timlin	(Republic of Ireland)	Midfielder	(Republic of Ireland) Derry City
David Cawley	(Republic of Ireland)	Midfielder	(Republic of Ireland) Galway United
Brendan Clarke	(Republic of Ireland)	Goalkeeper	(Republic of Ireland) Limerick
Dylan McGlade	(Republic of Ireland)	Midfielder	(Republic of Ireland) Longford Town
Dinny Corcoran	(Republic of Ireland)	Forward	(Republic of Ireland) Bohemians
Fuad Sule	(Republic of Ireland)	Midfielder	(Republic of Ireland) Bohemians
Conor Kane	(Republic of Ireland)	Defender	(Republic of Ireland) Drogheda United
Seán Hoare	(Republic of Ireland)	Defender	(Republic of Ireland) Dundalk
Jamie McGrath	(Republic of Ireland)	Midfielder	(Republic of Ireland) Dundalk
Keith Treacy	(Republic of Ireland)	Midfielder	Released

==== In ====
Player	Country	Position	Signed from
Killian Brennan	(Republic of Ireland)	Midfielder	(Republic of Ireland) Drogheda United
Owen Garvan	(Republic of Ireland)	Midfielder	(England) Colchester United
Jordi Balk	(Netherlands)	Defender	(Netherlands) FC Oss
Ian Turner	(Republic of Ireland)	Midfielder	(Republic of Ireland) Limerick
Paul O'Conor	(Republic of Ireland)	Midfielder	(Republic of Ireland) Limerick
Łukasz Skowron	(Poland)	Goalkeeper	(Portugal) Olhanense

==== Out ====
Player	Country	Position	Sold To
Pat Cregg	(Republic of Ireland)	Midfielder	(Scotland) Forfar Athletic
Sam Verdon	(Republic of Ireland)	Midfielder	(Republic of Ireland) Longford Town
Jack Bayly	(Republic of Ireland)	Midfielder	(Republic of Ireland) Drogheda United
Conor O'Malley	(Republic of Ireland)	Goalkeeper	(England) Peterborough United
Aidan Keena	(Republic of Ireland)	Forward	(Scotland) Hearts

=== Squad statistics ===
==== Appearances, goals and cards ====
Number in brackets represents (appearances of which were substituted ON). Last Updated – 28 October 2017

No.	Player	Airtricity League		FAI Cup		EA Sports Cup		Leinster Senior Cup		Total	
No.	Player	Apps	Goals	Apps	Goals	Apps	Goals	Apps	Goals	Apps	Goals
1	Conor O'Malley	21	0	0	0	0	0	0	0	21	0
1	Łukasz Skowron	7(1)	0	0	0	0	0	1	0	8(1)	0
2	Michael Barker	27(1)	1	2	0	3	0	2	0	34(1)	1
3	Ian Bermingham	31	4	2	0	2(1)	0	1	1	36(1)	5
4	Gavin Peers	19	0	0	0	2	0	1	0	22	0
5	Darren Dennehy	2	0	0	0	0	0	2	0	4	0
6	Pat Cregg	15(2)	0	0	0	1	0	1	0	17(2)	0
6	Owen Garvan	9	0	1	0	0	0	0	0	10	0
7	Conan Byrne	33(3)	9	2	0	2	0	2(1)	0	39(4)	9
8	Graham Kelly	27(5)	4	2(1)	0	3(1)	0	2(1)	0	34(8)	4
9	Christy Fagan	28(2)	7	2	1	1(1)	0	2(1)	2	33(4)	10
10	Sam Verdon	8(3)	0	0	0	2	0	0	0	10(3)	0
10	Killian Brennan	11	1	2	0	0	0	0	0	13	1
11	Jonathan Lunney	22(9)	0	1	0	2	0	3(1)	0	28(10)	0
12	Lee Desmond	32	0	2	0	3(1)	0	0	0	37(1)	0
13	Rory Feely	17(3)	1	0	0	3	0	3(1)	0	23(4)	1
14	Darragh Markey	18(7)	0	0	0	2	0	2	0	22(7)	0
15	Jack Bayly	1(1)	0	0	0	2	0	0	0	3(1)	0
15	Jordi Balk	12	0	2	0	0	0	0	0	14	0
16	Barry Murphy	6	0	2	0	3	0	2	0	13	0
17	Ciaran Kelly	0	0	0	0	0	0	2	0	2	0
18	Kurtis Byrne	30(14)	10	2(2)	0	1	0	3(1)	0	36(17)	10
19	Steven Grogan	0	0	0	0	1(1)	0	0	0	1(1)	0
20	Billy Dennehy	23(7)	2	2	0	1	1	1	0	27(7)	3
21	Paul O'Conor	8(1)	2	1	0	0	0	0	0	9(1)	2
22	Ger O'Brien	0	0	0	0	0	0	0	0	0	0
23	Alex O'Hanlon	17(9)	1	0	0	3(2)	0	3	2	23(11)	3
24	Aidan Keena	3(3)	0	0	0	2(2)	0	0	0	5(5)	0
25	Pat Jennings	0	0	0	0	0	0	0	0	0	0
26	Josh O'Hanlon	20(12)	2	1(1)	0	3	0	2	0	26(13)	2
29	Ian Turner	5(5)	0	2(2)	0	0	0	2	0	9(7)	0
	Jamie Lennon	0	0	0	0	0	0	2	1	2	1
	Cian Hughes	0	0	0	0	0	0	1(1)	0	1(1)	0
	Jake Walker	0	0	0	0	0	0	1(1)	0	1(1)	0
	Richie O'Farrell	0	0	0	0	0	0	1(1)	0	1(1)	0

==== Top scorers ====
Includes all competitive matches. Last updated 28 October 2017

Number	Name	SSE Airtricity League	FAI Cup	EA Sports Cup	Leinster Senior Cup	Total
18	Kurtis Byrne	10	0	0	0	10
9	Christy Fagan	7	1	0	2	10
7	Conan Byrne	9	0	0	0	9
3	Ian Bermingham	4	0	0	1	5
8	Graham Kelly	4	0	0	0	4
20	Billy Dennehy	2	0	1	0	3
23	Alex O'Hanlon	1	0	0	2	3
21	Paul O'Conor	2	0	0	0	2
26	Josh O'Hanlon	2	0	0	0	2
10	Killian Brennan	1	0	0	0	1
15	Jordi Balk	1	0	0	0	1
	Jamie Lennon	0	0	0	1	1
13	Rory Feely	1	0	0	0	1
2	Michael Barker	1	0	0	0	1

==== Top assists ====
Includes all competitive matches. Last updated 28 October 2017

Number	Name	SSE Airtricity League	FAI Cup	EA Sports Cup	Leinster Senior Cup	Total
7	Conan Byrne	11	2	0	1	14
11	Jonathan Lunney	8	0	0	0	8
20	Billy Dennehy	4	0	0	1	5
9	Christy Fagan	3	0	0	1	4
14	Darragh Markey	3	0	0	1	4
2	Michael Barker	3	0	0	0	3
8	Graham Kelly	1	0	0	1	2
13	Rory Feely	1	0	1	0	2
18	Kurtis Byrne	1	0	0	0	1
21	Paul O'Conor	1	0	0	0	1
6	Owen Garvan	1	0	0	0	1
3	Ian Bermingham	1	0	0	0	1
6	Pat Cregg	1	0	0	0	1
12	Lee Desmond	1	0	0	0	1
4	Gavin Peers	1	0	0	0	1
24	Aidan Keena	1	0	0	0	1

==== Top Clean Sheets ====
Includes all competitive matches. Last updated 28 October 2017

Position	Number	Name	SSE Airtricity League	FAI Cup	EA Sports Cup	Leinster Senior Cup	Total
GK	1	Conor O'Malley	3/21	0/0	0/0	0/0	3/21
GK	1	Łukasz Skowron	1/7	0/0	0/0	0/1	1/8
GK	16	Barry Murphy	1/6	1/2	2/3	1/2	5/13
GK	25	Pat Jennings	0/0	0/0	0/0	0/0	0/0

==== Disciplinary record ====
Number	Name	SSE Airtricity League		FAI Cup		EA Sports Cup		Leinster Senior Cup		Total	
Number	Name	Booked	Sent off (straight red)	Booked	Sent off (straight red)	Booked	Sent off (straight red)	Booked	Sent off (straight red)	Booked	Sent off (straight red)
4	Gavin Peers	6	1	0	0	0	0	1	0	7	1
8	Graham Kelly	6	0	1	0	1	0	0	0	8	0
3	Ian Bermingham	5	1	0	0	0	0	0	0	5	1
2	Michael Barker	4	0	0	0	1	0	1	0	6	0
15	Jordi Balk	5	0	0	0	0	0	0	0	5	0
10	Killian Brennan	5	0	0	0	0	0	0	0	5	0
6	Pat Cregg	5	0	0	0	0	0	0	0	5	0
14	Darragh Markey	3	0	0	0	1	0	0	0	4	0
13	Rory Feely	4	0	0	0	0	0	0	0	4	0
6	Owen Garvan	2	1	0	0	0	0	0	0	2	1
9	Christy Fagan	3	0	0	0	0	0	0	0	3	0
20	Billy Dennehy	3	0	0	0	0	0	0	0	3	0
23	Alex O'Hanlon	3	0	0	0	0	0	0	0	3	0
7	Conan Byrne	2	0	0	0	1	0	0	0	3	0
5	Darren Dennehy	1	1	0	0	0	0	0	0	1	1
24	Aidan Keena	0	1	0	0	0	0	0	0	0	1
21	Paul O'Conor	1	0	0	0	0	0	0	0	1	0
26	Josh O'Hanlon	1	0	0	0	0	0	0	0	1	0
12	Lee Desmond	1	0	0	0	0	0	0	0	1	0
18	Kurtis Byrne	1	0	0	0	0	0	0	0	1	0
16	Barry Murphy	1	0	0	0	0	0	0	0	1	0
TOTALS		62	5	1	0	4	0	2	0	69	5

==== Captains ====
No.	P	Name	Country	No. games	Notes
3	DF	Ian Bermingham	(Republic of Ireland)	35	Captain
4	DF	Gavin Peers	(Republic of Ireland)	3	Vice captain
10	DF	Killian Brennan	(Republic of Ireland)	1	Vice captain
16	GK	Barry Murphy	(Republic of Ireland)	1	
	MF	Jamie Lennon	(Republic of Ireland)	1	

Last updated: 28 October 2017
Source: Competitive match reports.
Competitive matches only
Matches started as captain only
Country: FIFA nationality; No.: Squad number; P: Position; Name: Player name; No. Games: Number of games started as captain.

== Club ==
=== Coaching staff ===
- Manager: Liam Buckley
- Head Of Player Recruitment/Coach: Dave Campbell
- Coach/Director of Football: Ger O'Brien
- Coach: Darius Kierans
- Goalkeeping coach: Pat Jennings
- Chartered Physiotherapist/Strength and Conditioning Coach: Mark Kenneally
- Coaches Assistant: Graeme Buckley
- Physiotherapist: Christy O'Neill
- Club Doctor: Dr Matt Corcoran
- Kit Man: Derek Haines
- Equipment Manager: David McGill
- Under 19's Manager: Gareth Dodrill
- Under 19's Assistant Manager: Martin Doyle
- Under 19's Coach: Sean Doody
- Under 17's Manager: Jamie Moore
- Under 17's Assistant Manager: Darragh O'Reilly
- Under 17's Assistant Manager: Sean Gahan
- Under 15's Manager: Denis Hyland
- Under 15's Assistant Manager: Sean O'Connor
- Under 15's Coach: Paul Webb
- Under 19's/17's/15's Coach: Keith Andrews
- Under 19's/17's Goalkeeping Coach: Stephen O'Reilly

=== Kit ===
Supplier: Umbro
Sponsor(s): Pieta House (front of jersey)
Bill Griffin Motors (back of jersey)

Home	Away	Third	Fourth

The club released a new Away kit for the season, with the Home and Third kits being retained from the 2016 season. The club's Main Shirt Sponsor, Clune Construction Company L.P.'s sponsorship deal came to an end leaving a vacancy for a new shirt sponsor. This vacancy was filled when the club voluntarily donated their shirt sponsorship place to local suicide prevention charity, Pieta House.

Type	Shirt	Shorts	Socks	Info
Home	Red/White Shoulders	White	Red	Worn 32 times; against Bray Wanderers (LOI) (H), Drogheda United (LOI) (A), Finn Harps (LOI) (H), Dundalk (LOI) (A), Shamrock Rovers (LOI) (H), Bluebell United (EAC) (H), Limerick (LOI) (H), Bray Wanderers (EAC) (H), Cork City (LOI) (H), Cork City (EAC) (A), Bray Wanderers (LOI) (A), Drogheda United (LOI) (H), Sligo Rovers (LOI) (H), Finn Harps (LOI) (A), Dundalk (LOI) (H), Shamrock Rovers (LOI) (A), Bohemians (LOI) (H), Limerick (LOI) (A), Galway United (LOI) (H), Cork City (LOI) (A), Derry City (LOI) (H), Bray Wanderers (LOI) (H), Drogheda United (LOI) (A), Firhouse Clover LSC) (H), Portmarnock (FAI) (A), Finn Harps (LOI) (H), Galway United (FAI) (H), Shelbourne (LSC), Dundalk (LOI) (A), Shamrock Rovers (LOI) (H), Limerick (LOI) (H), Cork City (LOI) (H)
Away	Blue	Blue	Blue	Worn 8 times; against Sligo Rovers (LOI) (A), Bohemians (LOI) (A), Galway United (LOI) (A), Derry City (LOI) (A), Sligo Rovers (LOI) (A), Bohemians (LOI) (A), Galway United (LOI) (A), Derry City (LOI) (A)
Third	White	Red	Red	Worn 5 times; against FAI FÁS (FRN) (N), Bluebell United (FRN) (N), Bray Wanderers (LSC) (A), Cabinteely (FRN) (H), Longford Town (FRN) (H)
Fourth	Navy	Navy	Navy	Worn 1 time; against Shelbourne (FRN) (N)

Key:
LOI=League of Ireland Premier Division
FAI=FAI Cup
EAC=EA Sports Cup
LSC=Leinster Senior Cup
FRN=Friendly

== Competitions ==
=== League of Ireland ===
==== League table ====
Pos	Team	Pld	W	D	L	GF	GA	GD	Pts	Qualification or relegation
6	Bray Wanderers	33	13	7	13	55	52	+3	46	
7	Limerick	33	10	10	13	41	51	−10	40	
8	St Patrick's Athletic	33	9	12	12	45	52	−7	39	
9	Sligo Rovers	33	8	15	10	33	44	−11	39	
10	Galway United (R)	33	7	14	12	45	50	−5	35	Relegation to League of Ireland First Division

Source: SSE Airtricity League, Soccerway
Rules for classification: 1) Points; 2) Goal difference; 3) Goals scored.
(R) Relegated

==== Results summary ====
Overall								Home						Away					
Pld	W	D	L	GF	GA	GD	Pts	W	D	L	GF	GA	GD	W	D	L	GF	GA	GD
33	9	12	12	45	52	−7	39	7	3	6	26	23	+3	2	9	6	19	29	−10

Last updated: 28 October 2017.

==== Results by round ====
Round	1	2	3	4	5	6	7	8	9	10	11	12	13	14	15	16	17	18	19	20	21	22	23	24	25	26	27	28	29	30	31	32	33
Ground	H	A	A	H	A	A	A	H	A	H	A	A	A	H	A	H	A	H	A	H	A	H	H	A	A	H	A	H	A	H	A	H	A
Result	L	L	D	L	L	W	W	L	D	L	D	D	W	D	L	L	D	L	D	D	L	W	W	W	D	W	L	W	L	D	D	W	D
Position	7	9	10	10	12	10	9	11	10	11	11	12	8	8	9	12	11	12	11	10	11	10	9	9	8	8	8	8	10	8	8	8	8

Updated to match(es) played on 28 October 2017. Source: 2017 League of Ireland Premier Division
A = Away; H = Home; W = Win; D = Draw; L = Loss

==== Matches ====
Win Draw Loss

24 February 2017 Round 1	St Patrick's Athletic	1–2	Bray Wanderers	Inchicore, Dublin 8
19:45 GMT	Darren Dennehy (yellow card) 27'; Pat Cregg (yellow card) 56'; Conan Byrne (yellow card) 62'; Graham Kelly 85'; Aidan Keena (red card) 90+1'; Darren Dennehy (red card) 90+2'; Billy Dennehy (yellow card) 90+2'; Barry Murphy (yellow card) 90+2'		Anthony Flood 22'; Gary McCabe (yellow card) 35'; Dylan Connolly (yellow card) 60'; Gary McCabe 65'; Ger Pender (yellow card) 81'; Tim Clancy (yellow card) 90+2'; Peter Cherrie (yellow card) 90+3'	Stadium: Richmond Park; Attendance: 1,722; Referee: Derek Tomney

3 March 2017 Round 2	Drogheda United	2–0	St Patrick's Athletic	Drogheda, County Louth
19:45 GMT	Thomas Byrne (yellow card) 42'; Gavin Brennan (yellow card) 58'; Jake Hyland 64'; Pat Cregg 90+3' (o.g.)		Alex O'Hanlon (yellow card) 42'; Christy Fagan (yellow card) 48'	Stadium: United Park; Attendance: 1,000; Referee: Sean Grant

10 March 2017 Round 3	Sligo Rovers	1–1	St Patrick's Athletic	Sligo, County Sligo
19:45 GMT	Kieran Sadlier 34'; Chris Kenny (yellow card) 43'		Pat Cregg (yellow card) 33'; Michael Barker 75'	Stadium: The Showgrounds; Attendance: 1,087; Referee: James McKell

13 March 2017 Round 4	St Patrick's Athletic	1–2	Finn Harps	Inchicore, Dublin 8
19:45 GMT	Graham Kelly 3'; Ian Bermingham (yellow card) 76'		Sean Houston (yellow card) 15'; Sean Houston 19'; Ciaran O'Connor 44'; Ethan Boyle (yellow card) 54'; Ciaran O'Connor (yellow card) 85'; Paddy McCourt (yellow card) 90+5'	Stadium: Richmond Park; Attendance: 895; Referee: Ben Connolly

18 March 2017 Round 5	Dundalk	3–0	St Patrick's Athletic	Dundalk, County Louth
19:00 GMT	Ciarán Kilduff 44'; Patrick McEleney 46'; Patrick McEleney 53'		Rory Feely (yellow card) 40'; Christy Fagan (yellow card) 45'	Stadium: Oriel Park; Attendance: 2,675; Referee: Graham Kelly

25 March 2017 Round 6	St Patrick's Athletic	2–1	Shamrock Rovers	Inchicore, Dublin 8
17:00 GMT	Gavin Peers (yellow card) 20'; Graham Kelly (yellow card) 26'; Kurtis Byrne 60'; Josh O'Hanlon 77'; Kurtis Byrne (yellow card) 81'; Darragh Markey (yellow card) 90'		Gary Shaw 14'; Sean Heaney (yellow card) 30'; Sean Heaney (yellow card) 34' (red card); Sean Boyd (yellow card) 85'	Stadium: Richmond Park; Attendance: 2,000 (Est.); Referee: Paul McLaughlin

31 March 2017 Round 7	Bohemians	0–4	St Patrick's Athletic	Phibsborough, Dublin 7
19:45 GMT	Jamie Doyle (yellow card) 6'		Christy Fagan 38'; Conan Byrne 45'; Conan Byrne 47'; Kurtis Byrne 90+1'	Stadium: Dalymount Park; Attendance: 2,600; Referee: Jim McKell

7 April 2017 Round 8	St Patrick's Athletic	0–2	Limerick	Inchicore, Dublin 8
19:45 GMT	Ian Bermingham (yellow card) 34'; Gavin Peers (yellow card) 57'; Conan Byrne (penalty missed) 64'		Tony Whitehead 27'; Robbie Williams (yellow card) 63'; John O'Flynn 83'	Stadium: Richmond Park; Attendance: 1,300 (Est.); Referee: Paul McLaughlin

14 April 2017 Round 9	Galway United	1–1	St Patrick's Athletic	Galway, County Galway
19:45 GMT	Gary Shanahan (yellow card) 45+1'; Ronan Murray 89' (pen.); Lee Grace (yellow card) 90+1'		Rory Feely 40'; Billy Dennehy (yellow card) 63'; Pat Cregg (yellow card) 89'	Stadium: Eamonn Deacy Park; Attendance: 1,119; Referee: Derek Tomney

21 April 2017 Round 10	St Patrick's Athletic	0–3	Cork City	Inchicore, Dublin 8
19:45 GMT	Michael Barker (yellow card) 59'; Gavin Peers (yellow card) 61'; Ian Bermingham (yellow card) 69'; Rory Feely (yellow card) 90'		Conor McCormack (yellow card) 43'; Garry Buckley (yellow card) 61'; Josh O'Hanlon 62' (o.g.); Karl Sheppard 85'; Garry Buckley 90'	Stadium: Richmond Park; Attendance: 1,786; Referee: Robert Hennessey

28 April 2017 Round 11	Derry City	2–2	St Patrick's Athletic	Buncrana, County Donegal
19:45 GMT	Ben Doherty (yellow card) 26'; Ronan Curtis 38'; Aaron McEneff 83'		Kurtis Byrne 20'; Gavin Peers (yellow card) 55'; Conan Byrne 67'; Rory Feely (yellow card) 90'	Stadium: Maginn Park; Attendance: 1,500 (Est.); Referee: Neil Doyle

5 May 2017 Round 12	Bray Wanderers	1–1	St Patrick's Athletic	Bray, County Wicklow
19:45 GMT	Ryan Brennan 24'; Tim Clancy (yellow card) 45'; Mark Salmon (yellow card) 52'; Jason Marks (yellow card) 60'; Dylan Connolly (yellow card) 90+2'; Jason Marks (yellow card) 90+3' (red card); Gary McCabe (yellow card) 90+4'		Rory Feely (yellow card) 22'; Kurtis Byrne 46'; Pat Cregg (yellow card) 82'	Stadium: Carlisle Grounds; Attendance: 1,287; Referee: Ben Connolly

12 May 2017 Round 13	St Patrick's Athletic	2–0	Drogheda United	Inchicore, Dublin 8
19:45 GMT	Ian Bermingham 7'; Kurtis Byrne 47'		Gareth McCaffrey (yellow card) 58'	Stadium: Richmond Park; Attendance: 1,191; Referee: Anthony Buttimer

19 May 2017 Round 14	St Patrick's Athletic	1–1	Sligo Rovers	Inchicore, Dublin 8
19:45 GMT	Christy Fagan 33'; Michael Barker (yellow card) 59'; Darragh Markey (yellow card) 62'; Graham Kelly (yellow card) 90'		Jonah Ayunga (yellow card) 59'; Mick Leahy 81'; Liam Martin (yellow card) 83'	Stadium: Richmond Park; Attendance: 1,300 (Est.); Referee: Paul Tuite

22 May 2017 Round 15	Finn Harps	3–1	St Patrick's Athletic	Ballybofey, County Donegal
20:00 GMT	Danny Morrissey 9'; Ethan Boyle (yellow card) 20'; Danny Morrissey 28'; Packie Mailey 42'; Gareth Harkin (yellow card) 58'; Michael Funston (yellow card) 75'; Ciarán Gallagher (yellow card) 83'; Caolan McAleer (yellow card) 90'		Gavin Peers (yellow card) 72'; Christy Fagan 83'; Conan Byrne (yellow card) 88'	Stadium: Finn Park; Attendance: 1,583; Referee: Ray Matthews

26 May 2017 Round 16	St Patrick's Athletic	0–2	Dundalk	Inchicore, Dublin 8
19:45 GMT	Michael Barker (yellow card) 77'; Graham Kelly (yellow card) 90'		Michael Duffy 21'; David McMillan 68'	Stadium: Richmond Park; Attendance: 1,436; Referee: Sean Grant

2 June 2017 Round 17	Shamrock Rovers	1–1	St Patrick's Athletic	Tallaght, Dublin 24
20:00 GMT	Graham Burke 16'; Graham Burke (yellow card) 24'; Graham Burke (red card) 78'		Pat Cregg (yellow card) 35'; Michael Barker (yellow card) 42'; Christy Fagan 55'; Ian Bermingham (yellow card) 80'	Stadium: Tallaght Stadium; Attendance: 3,500 (Est.); Referee: Robert Hennessey

16 June 2017 Round 18	St Patrick's Athletic	1–3	Bohemians	Inchicore, Dublin 8
19:45 GMT	Alex O'Hanlon 40'; Alex O'Hanlon (yellow card) 71'; Ian Bermingham (yellow card) 71'		Oscar Brennan 51'; Fuad Sule (yellow card) 53'; Dinny Corcoran 69'; Oscar Brennan (yellow card) 71'; Daniel Byrne (yellow card) 81'; Georgie Poynton 84'	Stadium: Richmond Park; Attendance: 2,077; Referee: Neil Doyle

24 June 2017 Round 19	Limerick	2–2	St Patrick's Athletic	Garryowen, County Limerick
18:30 GMT	Chiedozie Ogbene 16'; Rodrigo Tosi (yellow card) 47'; Rodrigo Tosi 60' (pen.)		Lee Desmond (yellow card) 22'; Ian Bermingham 63'; Conan Byrne 75'; Gavin Peers (yellow card) 80'; Alex O'Hanlon (yellow card) 90'	Stadium: Markets Field; Attendance: 1,470; Referee: James McKell

30 June 2017 Round 20	St Patrick's Athletic	1–1	Galway United	Inchicore, Dublin 8
19:45 GMT	Conan Byrne 47'		Padraig Cunningham 84'	Stadium: Richmond Park; Attendance: 1,200 (Est.); Referee: Derek Tomney

9 July 2017 Round 21	Cork City	1–0	St Patrick's Athletic	Turners Cross, County Cork
14:00 GMT	Sean Maguire 45+1' (pen.); Conor McCarthy (yellow card) 55'		Owen Garvan (yellow card) 45'; Owen Garvan (red card) HT; Killian Brennan (yellow card) 90+1'	Stadium: Turners Cross; Attendance: 2,406; Referee: Ben Connolly

14 July 2017 Round 22	St Patrick's Athletic	2–1	Derry City	Inchicore, Dublin 8
19:45 GMT	Kurtis Byrne 66' (pen.); Graham Kelly 77'		Ronan Curtis 42'; Ben Doherty (yellow card) 45'; Rory Patterson (yellow card) 62'; Darren Cole (yellow card) 66'; Ronan Curtis (yellow card) 76'	Stadium: Richmond Park; Attendance: 1,368; Referee: Rob Rogers

21 July 2017 Round 23	St Patrick's Athletic	3–1	Bray Wanderers	Inchicore, Dublin 8
20:00 GMT	Jordi Balk (yellow card) 29'; Killian Brennan (yellow card) 36'; Conan Byrne 52'; Christy Fagan 57'; Graham Kelly (yellow card) 72'; Billy Dennehy (yellow card) 73'; Josh O'Hanlon 90+2'		Gary McCabe 37'; Mark Salmon (yellow card) 41'	Stadium: Richmond Park; Attendance: 1,500 (Est.); Referee: Neil Doyle

28 July 2017 Round 24	Drogheda United	0–1	St Patrick's Athletic	Drogheda, County Louth
19:45 GMT	Tommy Byrne (yellow card) 64'; Luke Gallagher (yellow card) 87'		Christy Fagan 14'; Darragh Markey (yellow card) 90'	Stadium: United Park; Attendance: 850 (Est.); Referee: Paul Tuite

5 August 2017 Round 25	Sligo Rovers	1–1	St Patrick's Athletic	Sligo, County Sligo
19:45 GMT	Kyle Callan-McFadden 32'; Craig Roddan (yellow card) 62'; Jamie McDonagh (yellow card) 80'		Killian Brennan (yellow card) 26'; Kurtis Byrne 72'	Stadium: The Showgrounds; Attendance: 1,788; Referee: Ben Connolly

18 August 2017 Round 26	St Patrick's Athletic	4–0	Finn Harps	Inchicore, Dublin 8
19:45 GMT	Graham Kelly 24'; Josh O'Hanlon (yellow card) 66'; Kurtis Byrne 83'; Conan Byrne 89'; Kurtis Byrne 90+4'		Mark Timlin (yellow card) 22'; Eddie Dsane (yellow card) 70'; Gareth Harkin (yellow card) 88'; Eddie Dsane (red card) 89'	Stadium: Richmond Park; Attendance: 1,500 (Est.); Referee: Rob Harvey

1 September 2017 Round 27	Dundalk	6–0	St Patrick's Athletic	Dundalk, County Louth
19:45 GMT	David McMillan 45+2' (pen.); David McMillan 45+5'; Sean Gannon 50'; Robbie Benson 60'; Dylan Connolly 70'; Thomas Stewart 82'		Graham Kelly (yellow card) 23'; Ian Bermingham (red card) 45+1'; Jordi Balk (yellow card) 62'	Stadium: Oriel Park; Attendance: 2,388; Referee: Jim McKell

22 September 2017 Round 29	Bohemians	3–2	St Patrick's Athletic	Phibsborough, Dublin 7
19:45 GMT	Ismahil Akinade 2'; Patrick Kavanagh (yellow card) 19'; Derek Pender (yellow card) 58'; Daniel Byrne (yellow card) 75'		Christy Fagan 3'; Gavin Peers (red card) 15'; Conan Byrne 65'; Killian Brennan (yellow card) 90+2'	Stadium: Dalymount Park; Attendance: 2,543; Referee: Ben Connolly

25 September 2017 Round 28	St Patrick's Athletic	2–0	Shamrock Rovers	Inchicore, Dublin 8
19:45 GMT	Christy Fagan (yellow card) 3'; Ian Bermingham 19'; Paul O'Conor (yellow card) 20'; Jordi Balk (yellow card) 35'; Paul O'Conor 42'; Owen Garvan (yellow card) 89'		Luke Byrne (yellow card) 68'	Stadium: Richmond Park; Attendance: 2,361; Referee: Paul McLaughlin

7 October 2017 Round 30	St Patrick's Athletic	2–2	Limerick	Inchicore, Dublin 8
17:00 GMT	Jordi Balk (yellow card) 43'; Paul O'Conor 45+1'; Conan Byrne 70'; Killian Brennan (yellow card) 84'; Graham Kelly (yellow card) 88'		Chiedozie Ogbene 44'; Shane Duggan 90+5'	Stadium: Richmond Park; Attendance: 1,800 (Est.); Referee: Derek Tomney

13 October 2017 Round 31	Galway United	1–1	St Patrick's Athletic	Galway, County Galway
19:45 GMT	Eoin McCormack 36'; Gavan Holohan (yellow card) 40'; Eoin McCormack (yellow card) 72'		Billy Dennehy 45'; Jordi Balk (yellow card) 57'	Stadium: Eamonn Deacy Park; Attendance: 1,750 (Est.); Referee: Rob Rogers

20 October 2017 Round 32	St Patrick's Athletic	4–2	Cork City	Inchicore, Dublin 8
19:45 GMT	Jordi Balk 25'; Billy Dennehy 42'; Ian Bermingham 64'; Kurtis Byrne 78'		Ryan Delaney 12'; Kieran Sadlier 19'; Achille Campion (yellow card) 58'	Stadium: Richmond Park; Attendance: 1,618; Referee: Robert Hennessy

27 October 2017 Round 33	Derry City	1–1	St Patrick's Athletic	Buncrana, County Donegal
19:45 GMT	Rory Patterson 48'; Dean Jarvis (yellow card) 81'; Ronan Curtis (yellow card) 85'		Killian Brennan 26'	Stadium: Maginn Park; Attendance: 1,600 (Est.); Referee: Robert Harvey

=== FAI Cup ===
Win Draw Loss

13 August 2017 First Round	Portmarnock	0–2	St Patrick's Athletic	Portmarnock, Fingal, Dublin
14:00 GMT	Sam O'Connor (yellow card) 60'		Christy Fagan 45+1'; Gareth Whelan 87' (o.g.)	Stadium: Paddy's Hill; Attendance: 400 (Est.); Referee: Rob Rogers

25 August 2017 Second Round	St Patrick's Athletic	0–2	Galway United	Inchicore, Dublin 8
19:45 GMT	Graham Kelly (yellow card) 60'		Jonah Ayunga 17'; Colm Horgan (yellow card) 34'; Ronan Murray (yellow card) 80'; Eoin McCormack 90+2'	Stadium: Richmond Park; Attendance: 1,100; Referee: Paul McLoughlin

=== EA Sports Cup ===
Win Draw Loss

4 April 2017 First Round	St Patrick's Athletic	1–0	Bluebell United	Inchicore, Dublin 8
19:45 GMT	Graham Kelly (yellow card) 32'; Billy Dennehy 43'			Stadium: Richmond Park; Attendance: 500 (Est.); Referee: Thomas Dempsey

17 April 2017 Second Round	St Patrick's Athletic	0–0 (a.e.t.) (5–3 p)	Bray Wanderers	Inchicore, Dublin 8
17:00 GMT	Conan Byrne (yellow card) 43'; Darragh Markey (yellow card) 55'		Alan Kehoe (yellow card) 81'; John Sullivan (yellow card) 98'	Stadium: Richmond Park; Attendance: 650 (Est.); Referee: Rob Rogers
	Penalties
	Conan Byrne (penalty scored); Alex O'Hanlon (penalty scored); Jonathan Lunney (penalty scored); Rory Feely (penalty scored); Graham Kelly (penalty scored)		Ryan Brennan (penalty missed); Darragh Noone (penalty scored); Aaron Greene (penalty scored); John Sullivan (penalty scored)

1 May 2017 Quarter Final	Cork City	2–0	St Patrick's Athletic	Turners Cross
16:00 GMT	Connor Ellis 68'; Stephen Dooley 90+2'		Michael Barker (yellow card) 41'	Stadium: Turners Cross; Attendance: 1,792; Referee: Sean Grant

=== Leinster Senior Cup ===
Win Draw Loss

31 January 2017 Fourth Round	Bray Wanderers	0–4	St Patrick's Athletic	Bray, County Wicklow
19:45 GMT			Ian Bermingham 9'; Christy Fagan 12'; Christy Fagan 36'; Gavin Peers (yellow card) 40'; Alex O'Hanlon 52'; Michael Barker (yellow card) 83'	Stadium: Carlisle Grounds; Attendance: 250 (Est.)

8 August 2017 Quarter Final	St Patrick's Athletic	2–1	Firhouse Clover	Inchicore, Dublin 8
19:45 GMT	Jamie Lennon 15'; Alex O'Hanlon 90'		Luke Walsh 90+1'	Stadium: Richmond Park; Attendance: 350 (Est.); Referee: Alan Carey

28 August 2017 Semi Final	St Patrick's Athletic	0–1	Shelbourne	Inchicore, Dublin 8
19:45 GMT			Adam Evans 14'; Dylan Grimes (yellow card) 90+1'	Stadium: Richmond Park; Attendance: 500 (est.); Referee: Ben Connolly

=== Friendlies ===
Win Draw Loss

==== Pre-season ====
17 January 2017	St Patrick's Athletic	6–0	FAI FÁS	Crumlin, Dublin 12
13:30 GMT	Kurtis Byrne; Kurtis Byrne; Kurtis Byrne; Graham Kelly; Jonathan Lunney; TBC			Stadium: Pearse Park; Attendance: N/A

24 January 2017	St Patrick's Athletic	5–0	Bluebell United	Baldonnel, Dublin 22
19:45 GMT	Gavin Peers 15'; Gavin Peers 31'; Kurtis Byrne 45'; Aidan Keena 48'; Graham Kelly 52'			Stadium: John Hyland Park; Attendance: 150 (Est.)

5 February 2017	Shelbourne	2–1	St Patrick's Athletic	Blanchardstown, Dublin 15
14:00 GMT	Rory Feely 13' (o.g.); Adam Evans 88'		Ian Bermingham (yellow card) 35'; Conan Byrne 44'	Stadium: ITB; Attendance: 120 (Est.)

12 February 2017	St Patrick's Athletic	2–0	Cabinteely	Inchicore, Dublin 8
15:00 GMT	Conan Byrne 32'; Conan Byrne 42'			Stadium: Richmond Park; Attendance: N/A

17 February 2017	St Patrick's Athletic	2–0	Longford Town	Inchicore, Dublin 8
19:45 GMT	Kurtis Byrne 44'; Kurtis Byrne 48'			Stadium: Richmond Park; Attendance: 100 (Est.)

==== Mid-season ====
5 July 2017	St Patrick's Athletic	1–0	Heart of Midlothian	Inchicore, Dublin 8
19:45 GMT	Jonathan Lunney 24'; Billy Dennehy (yellow card) 60'			Stadium: Richmond Park; Attendance: 900 (Est.); Referee: Ben Connolly

7 September 2017	St Patrick's Athletic	7–2	Cabinteely	Inchicore, Dublin 8
19:45 GMT	Graham Kelly; Graham Kelly; Kurtis Byrne; Kurtis Byrne; Christy Fagan; Conan Byrne; Josh O'Hanlon		TBC; TBC	Stadium: Richmond Park; Attendance: N/A
