= Alex O'Hanlon =

Irish footballer (born 1996)

Personal information
- Full name: Alexander O'Hanlon
- Date of birth: 24 April 1996 (age 30)
- Place of birth: Blanchardstown, County Dublin, Ireland
- Positions: Left back; midfielder

Team information
- Current team: St Mochta's

Youth career
- 2003–2011: St. Kevin's Boys F.C.
- 2011–2016: Liverpool

Senior career*
Years	Team	Apps	(Gls)
2015–2016	Liverpool	0	(0)
2017	St Patrick's Athletic	17	(1)
2018	Glentoran	11	(1)
2019–2021	Shelbourne	26	(0)
2021	→ Wexford (loan)	7	(0)
2021–	St Mochta's		

International career
2012–2013	Republic of Ireland U17	5	(0)
2013–2016	Republic of Ireland U19	11	(1)
2017	Republic of Ireland U21	1	(0)
- * Club domestic league appearances and goals as of 21:35, 25 July 2021 (UTC)

Alex O'Hanlon (born 24 April 1996) is an Irish professional footballer who plays for St Mochta's in the Leinster Senior League. He has previously played for Liverpool, St Patrick's Athletic, Glentoran, Shelbourne & Wexford.

== Career ==
=== Early career ===
A native of Blanchardstown, County Dublin, O'Hanlon played with top Dublin youth football clubs St Kevin's Boys, the club that produced Republic of Ireland internationals Liam Brady, Damien Duff, Stephen Carr, Ian Harte, Robbie Brady and Jeff Hendrick among others. O'Hanlon excelled at underage level playing at left back and in May 2011, at the age of 15, he was snapped up by Premier League club Liverpool, despite interest from Premier League rivals Manchester United, Arsenal, Chelsea, as well as Spanish giants Real Madrid, with comparisons in playing style being made with Wales international Gareth Bale. After playing at left-back, O'Hanlon moved into midfield and his performances in the centre midfield earned him his first professional contract at the end of the 2012–13 season. He followed that up with seven goals in 28 games in 2013–14 season, helping him break into Alex Inglethorpe's U21s setup. O'Hanlon made 5 appearances in his side's 2014–15 UEFA Youth League campaign. During his time as first team manager, Brendan Rodgers included him in his first team squad for Premier League games against Swansea City and Newcastle United. In March 2016, first team manager Jürgen Klopp included him in the first team squad on their training camp in La Manga Club, Spain. In April 2016, O'Hanlon was offered a new contract with the club but opted to turn down the offer as he looked elsewhere for first team football. During this spell he went on trial with Sheffield Wednesday in search of a contract After he left Liverpool, he went on trial at Huddersfield Town, where he strangely went on to play over 10 games as a trialist and still didn't sign a full professional contract with the club.

=== St Patrick's Athletic ===
O'Hanlon returned home to Dublin and signed for League of Ireland Premier Division side St Patrick's Athletic on 9 January 2017 on a 2-year contract ahead of the 2017 season, alongside Barry Murphy and Kurtis Byrne. On 31 January 2017 O'Hanlon made his Pats debut away to Bray Wanderers in the Leinster Senior Cup, scoring the fourth goal in a 4–0 win for the Saints at the Carlisle Grounds. He began the season alternating between left wing and attacking midfield roles, impressing Pats supporters and media in the Dublin derby wins over Shamrock Rovers and Bohemians. On 17 April, O'Hanlon scored a penalty in a 5–3 shootout win over Bray Wanderers in the League Cup following a 0–0 draw after extra time. O'Hanlon scored his first league goal at senior level on 16 June 2017 when he opened the scoring in a 3–1 Dublin derby defeat at home to Bohemians. In the months after that, with the team struggling in a relegation battle, O'Hanlon lost his place in the starting 11 and was limited to the occasional substitute appearance. He scored his third goal of the season against Firhouse Clover amongst an experimental lineup in a 2–1 Leinster Senior Cup Quarter-final win, looping a shot over the goalkeeper from 25 yards.

=== Glentoran ===
Despite having another year left on his contract with Pat's, O'Hanlon and the club came to the decision to terminate his contract by mutual consent after he failed to nail down a spot in the starting team or even the bench in the second half of the season. He went on trial with newly promoted Waterford for pre-season, playing in a friendly vs Wexford but he was not offered a contract by the club. On 31 January 2018, O'Hanlon signed for Belfast club Glentoran, of the NIFL Premiership.

On 17 July 2018, O'Hanlon played for Grimsby Town on trial in their pre-season game with Sunderland.

=== Shelbourne ===
On 18 December 2018, it was announced that O'Hanlon had signed for League of Ireland First Division club Shelbourne ahead of their 2019 season. He made 9 appearances over the season as his side won the league, gaining promotion to the League of Ireland Premier Division. 2020 saw O'Hanlon play in all but one of Shels' 18 league games, as well as the League of Ireland promotion/relegation play-off as his side were relegated back to the League of Ireland First Division in what was a shortened season due to COVID-19.

==== Wexford loan ====
O'Hanlon signed for fellow League of Ireland First Division club Wexford on a season long loan on 25 February 2021. After making just 7 appearances for the club, he departed Wexford and left Shelbourne, opting to play amateur football.

=== St Mochta's ===
O'Hanlon signed for Leinster Senior League side St Mochta's in July 2021 during their pre-season. He appeared in their 2021 FAI Cup campaign, setting up an extra-time winner for Alan Byrne in a 2–1 win over Ulster Senior League side Cockhill Celtic in the Qualifying Round on 10 July 2021. On 25 July he played the full 90 minutes as his side reached the Second Round of the FAI Cup, beating fellow Leinster Senior League side Crumlin United 2–1 away from home.

== International career ==
O'Hanlon has played international football for the Republic of Ireland all the way up from Under 15s level to Under 21s. He made his Under 21 debut on 11 February 2017 against the Ireland Amateurs squad.

== Career statistics ==
Professional appearances – correct as of 31 August 2021.

Club	Division	Season	League		Cup		League Cup		Europe		Other		Total	
Club	Division	Season	Apps	Goals	Apps	Goals	Apps	Goals	Apps	Goals	Apps	Goals	Apps	Goals
Liverpool	Premier League	2015–16	0	0	0	0	0	0	0	0	—		0	0
St Patrick's Athletic	League of Ireland Premier Division	2017	17	1	0	0	3	0	—		3 (Note: Appearances in Leinster Senior Cup)	2	23	3
Glentoran	NIFL Premiership	2017–18	11	1	1	0	0	0	—		—		12	1
Shelbourne	League of Ireland First Division	2019	9	0	0	0	0	0	—		0	0	9	0
Shelbourne	League of Ireland Premier Division	2020	17	0	1	0	—		—		1 (Note: Appearances in League of Ireland play-offs)	0	19	0
Shelbourne	Shelbourne Total		26	0	1	0	0	0	—		1	0	28	0
Wexford (loan)	League of Ireland First Division	2021	7	0	—		—		—		—		7	0
St Mochta's	Leinster Senior League	2021–22			3	0	—		—				3	0
Career Total			59	2	5	0	3	0	0	0	4	2	71	4
