= Josh O'Hanlon =

Irish association football player

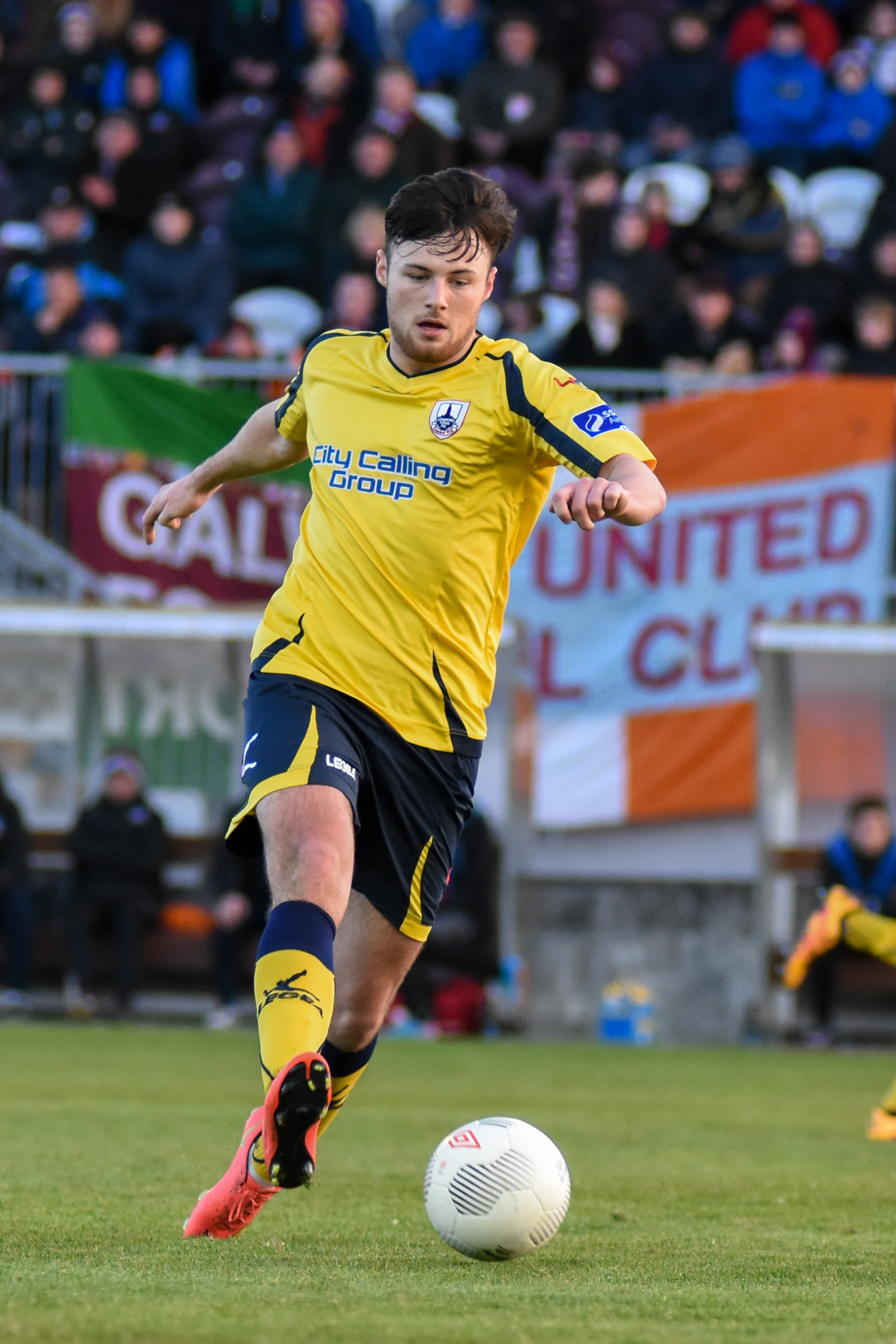
- Josh O'Hanlon in 2016

Personal information
- Full name: Joshua O'Hanlon
- Date of birth: 25 September 1995 (age 31)
- Place of birth: Dublin, Ireland
- Position: Striker

Team information
- Current team: Dandenong Thunder SC

Youth career
- –2013: St Kevin's Boys

Senior career*
Years	Team	Apps	(Gls)
2013–2014	Longford Town	22	(7)
2014–2016	Bournemouth	0	(0)
2014	→ Oxford City (loan)	4	(0)
2014	→ Poole Town (loan)	9	(6)
2015	→ York City (loan)	3	(0)
2015	→ Chester (loan)	2	(0)
2016	→ Longford Town (loan)	16	(2)
2016–2017	Newport County	7	(0)
2017	St Patrick's Athletic	19	(1)
2018	Cork City	20	(3)
2021–2023	Dandenong Thunder SC	3	(0)
- * Club domestic league appearances and goals as of 14:16, 13 December 2023 (UTC)

Joshua O'Hanlon (born 25 September 1995) is an Irish former professional footballer who plays as a striker for Dandenong Thunder SC. He previously played for Longford Town (two spells), Bournemouth, Oxford City, Poole Town, York City, Chester, Newport County and St Patrick's Athletic.

== Career ==
Born in Dublin, County Dublin, O'Hanlon played with St Kevin's Boys before joining Longford Town in February 2013. He scored on his first-team debut as a substitute in their 5–0 away win over Salthill Devon in the League of Ireland First Division on 8 March 2013. He finished the 2013 season with 8 goals from 26 appearances, as Longford lost the promotion play-offs to Bray Wanderers. He signed for English Championship club Bournemouth on 29 January 2014 on a three-and-a-half-year contract for a fee of around £50,000.

O'Hanlon joined Conference North club Oxford City on loan for the rest of the 2013–14 season on 25 March 2014. Making his debut a 4–0 away defeat to Leamington later that day, he completed his spell at Oxford City with four appearances.

O'Hanlon joined Southern League Premier Division team Poole Town on an initial one-month loan in July 2014. He made 12 appearances and scored seven goals for Poole before returning to Bournemouth with a knee injury in October 2014. O'Hanlon signed for League Two club York City on loan until the end of 2014–15 on 26 March 2015. He made his debut two days later as a 73rd-minute substitute for Jake Hyde in a 4–1 away win over Mansfield Town. He went on to make three appearances for York.

O'Hanlon joined National League club Chester on a one-month loan on 1 September 2015. The loan was cut short on 16 September 2015, as he struggled to break into the team.

On 8 January 2016, O'Hanlon re-joined League of Ireland Premier Division club Longford Town on loan for the first half of the 2016 season. He returned to his parent club having scored twice in his 17 appearances with Longford. He was released by Bournemouth at the end of 2015–16.

O'Hanlon joined League Two club Newport County on 8 November 2016 on a short-term contract, making his debut the same day after starting in a 2–0 home victory over AFC Wimbledon in the EFL Trophy. He was released by Newport on 9 January 2017, having failed to score in 10 appearances.

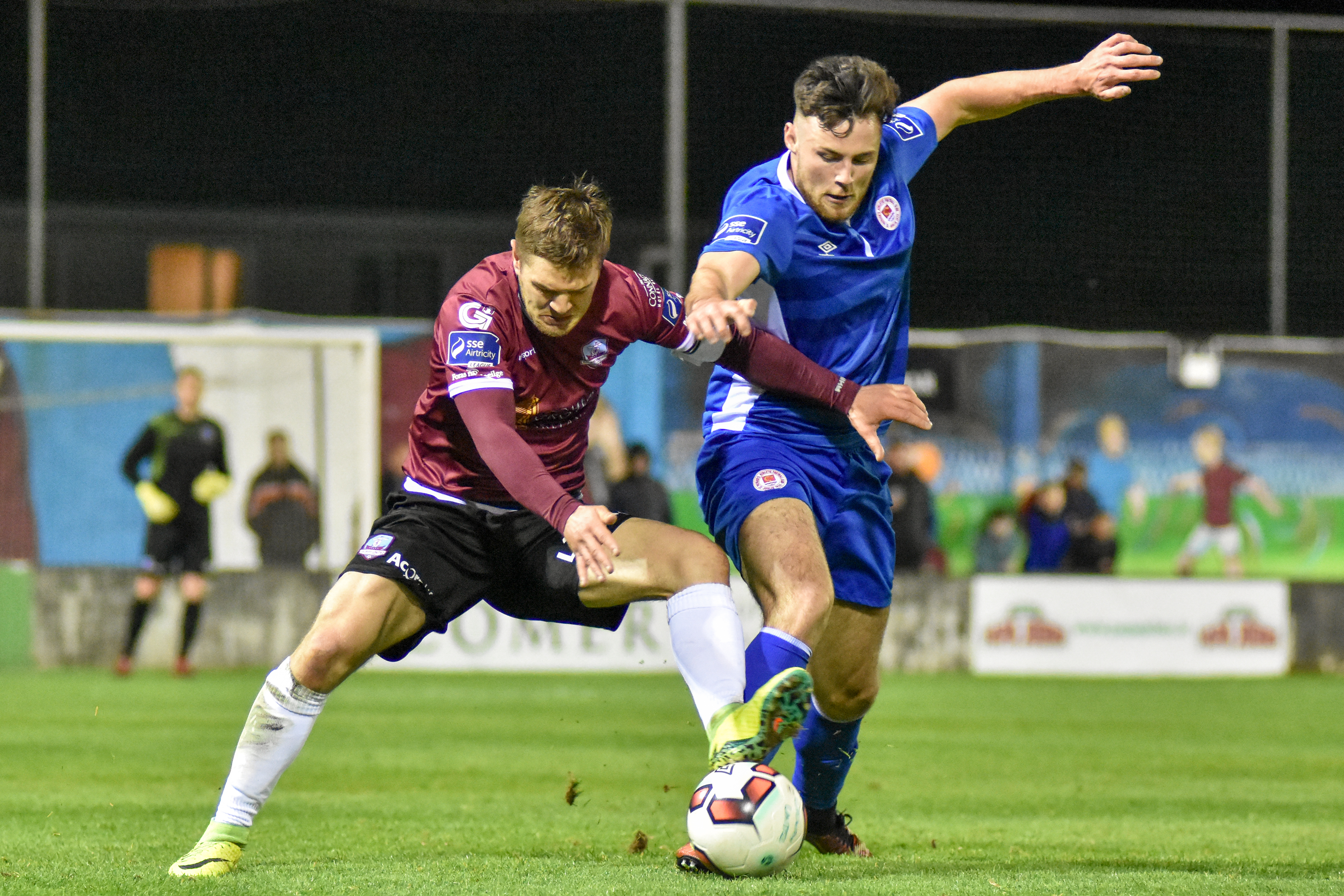
O'Hanlon in action for St Patrick's Athletic

O'Hanlon was on trial at League of Ireland Premier Division club St Patrick's Athletic from his native Dublin in January 2017, appearing in friendlies. O'Hanlon signed a contract with the Saints on 21 February 2017, 3 days before the first game of the season at home to Bray Wanderers.

Despite scoring just 2 goals in 26 games for St Patrick's Athletic, O'Hanlon earned a move to champions Cork City on 10 November 2017 ahead of be 2018 season.

== Career statistics ==
As of match played 27 October 2017

Appearances and goals by club, season and competition
Club	Season	League			National Cup		League Cup		Other		Total	
Club	Season	Division	Apps	Goals	Apps	Goals	Apps	Goals	Apps	Goals	Apps	Goals
Longford Town	2013	League of Ireland First Division	20	7	0	0	2	1	4 (Note: Appearances in League of Ireland play-offs)	0	26	8
Bournemouth	2013–14	Championship	0	0	—		—		—		0	0
Bournemouth	2014–15	Championship	0	0	—		0	0	—		0	0
Bournemouth	2015–16	Premier League	0	0	—		0	0	—		0	0
Bournemouth	Total		0	0	—		0	0	—		0	0
Oxford City (loan)	2013–14	Conference North	4	0	—		—		—		4	0
Poole Town (loan)	2014–15	Southern League Premier Division	9	6	3	1	—		—		12	7
York City (loan)	2014–15	League Two	3	0	—		—		—		3	0
Chester (loan)	2015–16	National League	2	0	—		—		—		2	0
Longford Town (loan)	2016	League of Ireland Premier Division	16	2	—		1	0	—		17	2
Newport County	2016–17	League Two	7	0	2	0	—		1 (Note: Appearance in EFL Trophy)	0	10	0
St Patrick's Athletic	2017	League of Ireland Premier Division	20	2	1	0	3	0	2	0	26	2
Cork City	2018	League of Ireland Premier Division	0	0	0	0	0	0	0	0	0	0
Career total			81	17	6	1	4	1	7	0	100	19
