= Łukasz Skowron =

Polish footballer

Personal information
- Full name: Łukasz Skowron
- Date of birth: 17 March 1991 (age 35)
- Place of birth: Sierpc, Poland
- Height: 1.86 m (6 ft 1 in)
- Position: Goalkeeper

Youth career
- –2008: Wisła Płock

Senior career*
Years	Team	Apps	(Gls)
2008–2009	Wisła Płock	0	(0)
2008–2009	Wisła Płock II	4	(0)
2009–2011	Polonia Warsaw	0	(0)
2011–2012	Radomiak Radom	23	(0)
2012–2013	Jagiellonia Białystok	8	(0)
2013	Radomiak Radom	7	(0)
2014–2015	Arka Gdynia	14	(0)
2015	Arka Gdynia II	5	(0)
2015–2016	AEL Limassol	10	(0)
2017	Olhanense	8	(0)
2017	St Patrick's Athletic	7	(0)
Total		86	(0)

International career
2007	Poland U17	1	(0)
2012	Poland U21	1	(0)
- * Club domestic league appearances and goals

Łukasz Skowron (born 17 March 1991) is a Polish former professional footballer who played as a goalkeeper. Besides Poland, he has played in Cyprus, Portugal, and the Republic of Ireland. He last played for St Patrick's Athletic of the League of Ireland Premier Division in their 2017 season.

He most recently served as the goalkeeping coach for Polish club Lechia Gdańsk.

== Honours ==
Radomiak Radom

- III liga Łódź–Masovian: 2011–12
