= 2015–16 AFC Bournemouth season =

A.F.C. Bournemouth – summary of 2015–16 season

AFC Bournemouth
2015–16 season
- Owner: Maxim Demin
- Chairman: Jeff Mostyn
- Manager: Eddie Howe
- Stadium: Dean Court
- Premier League: 16th
- FA Cup: Fifth round
- League Cup: Fourth round
- Top goalscorer: League: Joshua King (6); All: Joshua King (7)
Home colours	Away colours	Third colours

The 2015–16 season was Bournemouth's first season in the Premier League (and their first ever season in the top-flight of English football) after gaining promotion in the previous season in their 126th year in existence. This season Bournemouth participated in the Premier League, FA Cup and League Cup. The season covered the period from 1 July 2015 to 30 June 2016.

== Squad ==
No.	Name	Pos.	Nat.	Place of Birth	Age	Apps	Goals	Signed from	Date signed	Fee	End
Goalkeepers
1	Artur Boruc	GK	(Poland)	Siedlce	46	49	0	Southampton	1 July 2015	Free	2016
21	Ryan Allsop	GK	(England)	Birmingham	34	26	0	Leyton Orient	18 January 2013	Free	2016
23	Adam Federici	GK	(Australia)	Nowra	41	8	0	Reading	1 July 2015	Free	2018
Defenders
2	Simon Francis	CB	(England)	Nottingham	41	197	3	Charlton Athletic	7 November 2011	Free	2017
3	Steve Cook	CB/RB	(England)	Hastings	35	161	9	Brighton & Hove Albion	3 January 2012	£150,000	2017
5	Tommy Elphick	CB	(England)	Brighton	39	217	5	Brighton & Hove Albion	10 August 2012	£220,000	Undisclosed
11	Charlie Daniels	LB	(England)	Walthamstow	40	145	9	Leyton Orient	November 2011	£198,000	2017
14	Tyrone Mings	LB	(England)	Bath	33	2	0	Ipswich Town	26 June 2015	£8,000,000	2019
15	Adam Smith	RB	(England)	London	35	101	3	Tottenham Hotpsur	28 January 2014	Undisclosed	2017
22	Elliott Ward	CB	(England)	Harrow	41	28	0	Norwich City	18 June 2013	Free	2017
25	Sylvain Distin	CB	(France)	Bagnolet	48	10	0	Everton	1 July 2015	Free	2016
33	Joe Bennett	LB	(England)	Rochdale	36	0	0	Aston Villa	1 September 2015	Loan	2016
38	Baily Cargill	CB	(England)	Winchester	31	7	0	Academy	1 July 2014	Trainee	2017
Midfielders
4	Dan Gosling	CM	(England)	Brixham	36	42	8	Newcastle United	16 May 2014	Free	2018
6	Andrew Surman	CM	(England) (South Africa)	Johannesburg	40	121	5	Norwich City	1 September 2014	Undisclosed	2017
7	Marc Pugh	WG/CF	(England)	Bacup	39	254	51	Hereford United	4 June 2010	£110,000	2018
8	Harry Arter	CM	(Republic of Ireland) (England)	Sidcup	36	185	25	Woking	7 June 2010	£8,000	2018
10	Max Gradel	WG	(Ivory Coast)	Abidjan	38	17	1	Saint-Étienne	4 August 2015	£7,000,000	2019
16	Shaun MacDonald	DM	(Wales)	Swansea	38	97	7	Swansea City	25 August 2011	£125,000	2016
19	Junior Stanislas	WG	(England)	Kidbrooke	36	31	7	Burnley	26 June 2014	Free	2017
20	Christian Atsu	WG/AM	(Ghana)	Ada Foah	34	2	0	Chelsea	29 May 2015	Loan	2016
24	Lee Tomlin	AM/WG/CF	(England)	Leicester	37	9	0	Middlesbrough	4 August 2015	£3,500,000	2018
30	Matt Ritchie	LW	(Scotland) (England)	Gosport	37	117	29	Swindon Town	30 January 2013	£409,200	2018
32	Eunan O'Kane	DM	(Republic of Ireland) (Northern Ireland)	Derry	36	109	6	Torquay United	26 July 2012	Undisclosed	2017
Forwards
9	Tokelo Rantie	CF	(South Africa)	Parys	36	51	5	Malmö FF	28 August 2013	£2,500,000	2016
13	Callum Wilson	CF	(England)	Coventry	34	57	28	Coventry City	4 July 2014	£3,000,000	2019
17	Joshua King	CF/LW	(Norway)	Oslo	34	16	2	Blackburn Rovers	28 May 2015	£1,000,000	2018
18	Yann Kermorgant	CF	(France)	Vannes	45	66	27	Charlton Athletic	31 January 2014	Undisclosed	2016
27	Glenn Murray	CF	(England)	Maryport	43	12	3	Crystal Palace	7 August 2015	£4,000,000	2018

=== Statistics ===
==== Appearances and goals ====
No.	Pos	Nat	Player	Total		Premier League		FA Cup		League Cup	
No.	Pos	Nat	Player	Apps	Goals	Apps	Goals	Apps	Goals	Apps	Goals
1	GK	(Poland) POL	Artur Boruc	32	0	32	0	0	0	0	0
2	DF	(England) ENG	Simon Francis	42	0	38	0	1+1	0	2	0
3	DF	(England) ENG	Steve Cook	38	4	36	4	0+1	0	1	0
4	MF	(England) ENG	Dan Gosling	37	4	28+6	3	1	0	1+1	1
5	DF	(England) ENG	Tommy Elphick	14	1	11+1	1	2	0	0	0
6	MF	(England) ENG	Andrew Surman	38	0	38	0	0	0	0	0
7	MF	(England) ENG	Marc Pugh	30	5	15+11	3	1+1	1	1+1	1
8	MF	(Republic of Ireland) IRL	Harry Arter	22	1	21	1	0	0	1	0
9	FW	(South Africa) RSA	Tokelo Rantie	6	0	0+3	0	1	0	0+2	0
10	MF	(Ivory Coast) CIV	Max Gradel	14	1	11+3	1	0	0	0	0
11	DF	(England) ENG	Charlie Daniels	39	3	37	3	1	0	1	0
12	FW	(Paraguay) PAR	Juan Iturbe	4	0	0+2	0	2	0	0	0
13	FW	(England) ENG	Callum Wilson	13	5	9+4	5	0	0	0	0
14	DF	(England) ENG	Tyrone Mings	2	0	0+1	0	0	0	1	0
15	DF	(England) ENG	Adam Smith	35	2	22+9	2	1	0	3	0
16	MF	(Wales) WAL	Shaun MacDonald	9	1	0+3	0	3	0	3	1
17	FW	(Norway) NOR	Joshua King	35	7	24+7	6	2	1	1+1	0
18	FW	(France) FRA	Yann Kermorgant	11	1	0+7	0	1	0	3	1
19	MF	(England) ENG	Junior Stanislas	25	5	17+4	3	1	0	3	2
20	FW	(England) ENG	Benik Afobe	15	4	12+3	4	0	0	0	0
21	GK	(England) ENG	Ryan Allsop	1	0	0+1	0	0	0	0	0
23	GK	(Australia) AUS	Adam Federici	12	0	6	0	3	0	3	0
24	MF	(England) ENG	Lee Tomlin	10	1	3+3	0	1	1	1+2	0
25	DF	(France) FRA	Sylvain Distin	16	0	9+3	0	3	0	1	0
27	FW	(England) ENG	Glenn Murray	21	4	6+13	3	1+1	1	0	0
28	FW	(England) ENG	Lewis Grabban	16	0	4+11	0	1	0	0	0
30	MF	(Scotland) SCO	Matt Ritchie	41	4	33+4	4	0+2	0	1+1	0
32	MF	(Republic of Ireland) IRL	Eunan O'Kane	20	0	6+10	0	3	0	1	0
36	DF	(England) ENG	Matt Butcher	2	0	0	0	1	0	0+1	0
38	DF	(England) ENG	Baily Cargill	4	0	0	0	2	0	2	0
47	DF	(England) ENG	Jordan Lee	1	0	0	0	1	0	0	0

==== Disciplinary record ====
As of 20 December 2015

No.	Po.	Name	Premier League		FA Cup		League Cup		Total	
No.	Po.	Name	Yellow card	Red card	Yellow card	Red card	Yellow card	Red card	Yellow card	Red card
1	GK	(Poland) Artur Boruc	2	0	0	0	0	0	2	0
2	DF	(England) Simon Francis	5	1	0	0	0	0	5	1
3	DF	(England) Steve Cook	5	0	0	0	0	0	5	0
4	MF	(England) Dan Gosling	6	0	1	0	0	0	7	0
6	MF	(England) Andrew Surman	4	0	0	0	0	0	4	0
8	MF	(Republic of Ireland) Harry Arter	6	0	0	0	0	0	6	0
10	MF	(Ivory Coast) Max Gradel	1	0	0	0	0	0	1	0
11	DF	(England) Charlie Daniels	2	0	0	0	0	0	2	0
12	FW	(Paraguay) Juan Iturbe	0	0	1	0	0	0	1	0
15	DF	(England) Adam Smith	5	0	0	0	0	0	5	0
16	MF	(Wales) Shaun MacDonald	0	0	0	0	1	0	1	0
17	FW	(Norway) Joshua King	1	0	1	0	1	0	3	0
19	MF	(England) Junior Stanislas	1	0	0	0	0	0	1	0
24	MF	(England) Lee Tomlin	1	0	0	0	0	0	1	0
27	FW	(England) Glenn Murray	2	0	0	0	0	0	2	0
28	FW	(England) Lewis Grabban	2	0	0	0	0	0	2	0
30	MF	(Scotland) Matt Ritchie	5	0	0	0	0	0	5	0
32	MF	(Republic of Ireland) Eunan O'Kane	2	0	1	0	0	0	3	0
38	DF	(England) Baily Cargill	0	0	0	0	1	0	1	0
Total			51	1	4	0	3	0	58	1

== Transfers ==
=== Transfers in ===
Date from	Position	Nationality	Name	From	Fee	Ref.
1 July 2015	GK	POL	Artur Boruc	Southampton	Free transfer	
1 July 2015	CB	FRA	Sylvain Distin	Everton	Free transfer	
1 July 2015	GK	AUS	Adam Federici	Reading	Free transfer	
1 July 2015	LW	NOR	Joshua King	Blackburn Rovers	£1,000,000	
1 July 2015	LB	ENG	Tyrone Mings	Ipswich Town	£8,000,000 + Fraser loan	
4 August 2015	RW	CIV	Max Gradel	Saint-Étienne	£7,000,000	
4 August 2015	ST	ENG	Lee Tomlin	Middlesbrough	£3,000,000	
1 September 2015	CF	ENG	Glenn Murray	Crystal Palace	Undisclosed (reported £3,000,000)	
17 September 2015	CM	ITA	Alessandro Cannataro	Internazionale	Free transfer	
10 January 2016	CF	ENG	Benik Afobe	Wolverhampton Wanderers	£10,000,000	
11 January 2016	ST	JAM	Lewis Grabban	Norwich City	£8,000,000	
1 February 2016	DF	WAL	Rhoys Wiggins	Sheffield Wednesday	£200,000	

=== Transfers out ===
Date from	Position	Nationality	Name	To	Fee	Ref.
1 July 2015	CB	ENG	Miles Addison	Peterborough United	Released	
1 July 2015	GK	LIE	Benjamin Büchel	Oxford United (Note: Following Büchel's release he joined Oxford United.)	Released	
1 July 2015	RM	SEN	Mohamed Coulibaly	Racing Santander (Note: Following Coulibaly's release he joined Racing Santander.)	Free transfer	
1 July 2015	GK	ENG	Darryl Flahavan	Crawley Town (Note: Following Flahavan's release he joined Crawley Town)	Released	
1 July 2015	LB	IRL	Ian Harte	Retired (Note: Following Harte's release he announced his retirement.)	—N/a	
1 July 2015	CF	NIR	Josh McQuoid	Luton Town (Note: Following McQuoid's release he joined Luton Town.)	Free transfer	
1 July 2015	CB	WAL	Joe Partington	Eastleigh (Note: Following Partington's release he joined Eastleigh.)	Free transfer	
1 July 2015	CF	JER	Brett Pitman	Ipswich Town	Undisclosed	
1 September 2015	GK	NIR	Lee Camp	Rotherham United	Free transfer	
20 January 2016	DF	ENG	Elliott Ward	Blackburn Rovers	Contract terminated	
20 January 2016	FW	FRA	Yann Kermorgant	Reading	Undisclosed	
1 February 2016	CM	ITA	Alessandro Cannataro	Unattached	Free transfer	

=== Loans in ===
Date from	Position	Nationality	Name	From	Until	Ref.
1 July 2015	RW	GHA	Christian Atsu	Chelsea	End of season	
13 July 2015	LB	ITA	Filippo Costa	Chievo	End of season	
1 September 2015	LW	ARG	Tomás Andrade	River Plate	1 February 2016	
1 September 2015	LB	ENG	Joe Bennett	Aston Villa	4 January 2016	
1 January 2016	RW	ARG	Juan Iturbe	Roma	End of season	
28 January 2016	GK	LIT	Marius Adamonis	Atlantas	End of season	

=== Loans out ===
Date from	Position	Nationality	Name	To	Until	Ref.
1 July 2015	RM	SCO	Ryan Fraser	Ipswich Town	End of season	(Note: Fraser's loan to Ipswich Town was included with the £8,000,000 transfer of Tyrone Mings.)
7 July 2015	CF	ENG	Jayden Stockley	Portsmouth	3 January 2016	
7 August 2015	CF	ENG	Harry Cornick	Yeovil Town	7 October 2015	(Note: On 9 September 2015, Cornick's loan at Yeovil was extended until 10 October 2015.)
18 August 2015	AM	ENG	Josh Wakefield	Yeovil Town	19 September 2015	
1 September 2015	ST	IRL	Josh O'Hanlon	Chester	1-Month	
9 September 2015	CB	ENG	Elliott Ward	Huddersfield Town	7 October 2015	
7 December 2015	CB	ENG	Elliott Ward	Huddersfield Town	28 December 2015	
11 January 2016	FW	ENG	Jayden Stockley	Exeter City	End of season	
27 January 2016	MF	ENG	Lee Tomlin	Bristol City	End of season	
1 February 2016	GK	ENG	Ryan Allsop	Wycombe Wanderers	End of season	
1 February 2016	DF	ENG	Baily Cargill	Coventry City	End of season	
20 February 2016	FW	ENG	Brandon Goodship	Yeovil Town	End of season	
25 February 2016	MF	ENG	Josh Wakefield	Walsall	End of season	

== Pre-season friendlies ==
On 2 June 2015, AFC Bournemouth announced they would travel to the United States to face the Philadelphia Union of Major League Soccer on 14 July 2015. A day later the club announced they would face French Ligue 1 side Nantes and German Bundesliga side 1899 Hoffenheim. Also confirmed was a home friendly against Cardiff City. On 8 June, friendlies against Exeter City and Yeovil Town were confirmed.

14 July 2015 Friendly	Philadelphia Union	1–4	Bournemouth	Chester, United States
19:00 EDT	Marquez 35'	Report	King 20'; Wilson 26'; Pugh 62'; Rantie 85' (pen.)	Stadium: PPL Park; Attendance: 22,478

18 July 2015 Friendly	Exeter City	1–2	Bournemouth	Exeter
15:00 GMT (UTC+1)	Wheeler 33'	Report	Gosling 53'; Stanislas 77'	Stadium: St James Park; Attendance: 2,125 (inc. 360 Cherries supporters)

21 July 2015 Friendly	Salisbury	2–1	Bournemouth	Old Sarum
19:30 BST	Nolan 65'; Ford	Report	Cornick 23'	Stadium: The Raymond McEnhill Stadium; Attendance: 1,727

25 July 2015 Friendly	Nantes	0–0	Bournemouth	Nantes, France
19:30 GMT (UTC+2)		Report		Stadium: Stade de la Beaujoire

28 July 2015 Friendly	Yeovil Town	0–3	Bournemouth	Yeovil
19:45 BST		Report	Stanislas (pen.); King	Stadium: Huish Park; Attendance: 2,422 (687 Bournemouth); Referee: Kevin Johnson

31 July 2015 Friendly	Bournemouth	2–3	Cardiff City	Bournemouth
19:45 BST	Rantie; Pugh	Report	Ralls; Revell	Stadium: Dean Court

1 August 2015 Friendly	1899 Hoffenheim	0–0	Bournemouth	Sinsheim, Germany
17:00 CEST		Report		Stadium: Rhein-Neckar Arena

== Competitions ==
=== Overall ===
Competition	Started round	Final position / round	First match	Last match
Premier League	—	16th	8 August 2015	17 May 2016
FA Cup	Third round	Fifth round	9 January 2016	20 February 2016
League Cup	Second round	Fourth round	25 August 2015	29 October 2015

Updated to match played 17 May 2016
Source: Competitions

=== Overview ===
Competition	Record							
Competition	G	W	D	L	GF	GA	GD	Win %
Premier League	38	11	9	18	45	67	−22	28.95
FA Cup	3	2	0	1	4	4	+0	66.67
League Cup	3	2	0	1	6	3	+3	66.67
Total	44	15	9	20	55	74	−19	34.09

Updated to match played 17 May 2016
Source: Competitions

=== Premier League ===
==== League table ====
Pos	Team	Pld	W	D	L	GF	GA	GD	Pts	Qualification or relegation
14	West Bromwich Albion	38	10	13	15	34	48	−14	43	
15	Crystal Palace	38	11	9	18	39	51	−12	42	
16	Bournemouth	38	11	9	18	45	67	−22	42	
17	Sunderland	38	9	12	17	48	62	−14	39	
18	Newcastle United (R)	38	9	10	19	44	65	−21	37	Relegation to EFL Championship

Source: Barclays Premier League
Rules for classification: 1) Points; 2) Goal difference; 3) Goals scored; 4) Play-offs (only if needed to decide champion, teams for relegation or teams for UEFA competitions).
(R) Relegated

==== Results summary ====
Overall								Home						Away					
Pld	W	D	L	GF	GA	GD	Pts	W	D	L	GF	GA	GD	W	D	L	GF	GA	GD
38	11	9	18	45	67	−22	42	5	5	9	23	34	−11	6	4	9	22	33	−11

Last updated: 18 May 2016.

==== Results by matchday ====
Matchday	1	2	3	4	5	6	7	8	9	10	11	12	13	14	15	16	17	18	19	20	21	22	23	24	25	26	27	28	29	30	31	32	33	34	35	36	37	38
Ground	H	A	A	H	A	H	A	H	A	H	A	H	A	H	A	H	A	H	A	A	H	H	A	A	H	H	A	H	A	H	A	H	A	H	H	A	H	A
Result	L	L	W	D	L	W	L	D	L	L	L	L	D	D	W	W	W	D	L	D	L	W	D	W	L	L	D	W	W	W	L	L	W	L	L	L	D	L
Position	14	19	10	11	15	11	16	15	17	17	17	18	18	18	17	14	14	14	16	15	17	15	15	15	15	15	15	15	14	13	13	13	11	13	14	15	16	16

Updated to match(es) played on 17 May 2016. Source:
A = Away; H = Home; W = Win; D = Draw; L = Loss

==== Matches ====
On 17 June 2015, the fixtures for the forthcoming season were announced.

Win Draw Loss Postponed

8 August 2015 1	Bournemouth	0–1	Aston Villa	Bournemouth
15:00 BST	King (yellow card) 24'; Cook (yellow card) 41'; Gosling (yellow card) 80'	Report	Clark (yellow card) 45+1'; Gestede 72'; Bacuna (yellow card) 74'; Gueye (yellow card) 75'; Westwood (yellow card) 90+2'	Stadium: Dean Court; Attendance: 11,155; Referee: Mark Clattenburg

17 August 2015 2	Liverpool	1–0	Bournemouth	Liverpool
20:00 BST	Benteke 26'; Gomez (yellow card) 75'	Report	O'Kane (yellow card) 34'; Ritchie (yellow card) 76'; Tomlin (yellow card) 77'; Cook (yellow card) 90+1'	Stadium: Anfield; Attendance: 44,102; Referee: Craig Pawson

22 August 2015 3	West Ham United	3–4	Bournemouth	London
15:00 BST	Noble 48' (pen.); Kouyaté 53'; Jenkinson (red card) 79'; Maïga 82'	Report	Wilson 11', 28', 79' (pen.); Pugh 66'; Boruc (yellow card) 75'	Stadium: Boleyn Ground; Attendance: 34,977; Referee: Jonathan Moss

29 August 2015 4	Bournemouth	1–1	Leicester City	Bournemouth
15:00 BST	Gradel (yellow card) 1'; Wilson 24'; O'Kane (yellow card) 75'	Report	De Laet (yellow card) 13'; King (yellow card) 36'; Huth (yellow card) 48'; Vardy 86' (pen.); Schlupp (yellow card) 90+2'	Stadium: Dean Court; Attendance: 11,155; Referee: Neil Swarbrick

12 September 2015 5	Norwich City	3–1	Bournemouth	Norwich
15:00 BST	Jerome 35'; Hoolahan 52'; Jarvis 67'	Report	Cook 81'	Stadium: Carrow Road; Attendance: 27,018; Referee: Martin Atkinson

19 September 2015 6	Bournemouth	2–0	Sunderland	Bournemouth
15:00 BST	Wilson 4'; Ritchie 9'; Gosling (yellow card) 80'; Murray (yellow card) 90'	Report	Coates (yellow card) 15'; Jones (yellow card) 23'; Kaboul (yellow card) 43' (yellow-red card) 74'; Borini (yellow card) 63'; Toivonen (yellow card) 84'	Stadium: Dean Court; Attendance: 11,271; Referee: Kevin Friend

26 September 2015 7	Stoke City	2–1	Bournemouth	Stoke-on-Trent
15:00 BST	Walters 32'; Diouf 83'	Report	Gosling 76'	Stadium: Britannia Stadium; Attendance: 27,742; Referee: Lee Mason

3 October 2015 8	Bournemouth	1–1	Watford	Bournemouth
15:00 BST	Murray 28', (yellow card) 43'	Report	Ighalo 45'; Gomes (yellow card) 84'	Stadium: Dean Court; Attendance: 11,187; Referee: Michael Oliver

17 October 2015 9	Manchester City	5–1	Bournemouth	Manchester
15:00 BST	Sterling 7', 29', 45'; Bony 11', 89'; Sagna (yellow card) 27'; Otamendi (yellow card) 42'	Report	Murray 22'; Ritchie (yellow card) 87'	Stadium: City of Manchester Stadium; Attendance: 54,502; Referee: Mike Dean

25 October 2015 10	Bournemouth	1–5	Tottenham Hotspur	Bournemouth
14:05 BST	Ritchie 1'	Report	Kane 9' (pen.), 56', 64'; Dembélé 17'; Lamela 30'; Rose (yellow card) 32'	Stadium: Dean Court; Attendance: 11,332; Referee: Roger East

1 November 2015 11	Southampton	2–0	Bournemouth	Southampton
16:00 GMT	Wanyama (yellow card) 21' (yellow-red card) 78'; Davis 31'; Pellè 36'	Report	Francis (yellow card) 57'; Gosling (yellow card) 64'	Stadium: St. Mary's Stadium; Attendance: 31,229; Referee: Craig Pawson

7 November 2015 12	Bournemouth	0–1	Newcastle United	Bournemouth
12:45 GMT	Arter (yellow card) 69'; Smith (yellow card) 83'	Report	Pérez 27'; Janmaat (yellow card) 44'; Tioté (yellow card) 88'	Stadium: Vitality Stadium; Attendance: 11,155; Referee: Lee Mason

21 November 2015 13	Swansea City	2–2	Bournemouth	Swansea
15:00 GMT	Ayew 28'; Shelvey 39' (pen.), (yellow card) 88'; Bartley (yellow card) 72'; Sigurðsson (yellow card) 87'	Report	King 10'; Gosling 26'; Ritchie (yellow card) 30'; Stanislas (yellow card) 51'	Stadium: Liberty Stadium; Attendance: 20,878; Referee: Andre Marriner

28 November 2015 14	Bournemouth	3–3	Everton	Bournemouth
15:00 GMT	Smith 80'; Gosling (yellow card) 82'; Stanislas 87', 90+8'; Daniels (yellow card) 90'	Report	Funes Mori 25'; Lukaku 35'; Barkley 90+5'	Stadium: Dean Court; Attendance: 11,228; Referee: Kevin Friend

5 December 2015 15	Chelsea	0–1	Bournemouth	London
17:30 GMT	Pedro (yellow card) 21'; Costa (yellow card) 63'	Report	Surman (yellow card) 23'; Murray 82'	Stadium: Stamford Bridge; Attendance: 41,631; Referee: Mike Jones

12 December 2015 16	Bournemouth	2–1	Manchester United	Bournemouth
17:30 GMT	Stanislas 2'; King 54'; Arter (yellow card) 85'; Boruc (yellow card) 90'	Report	Fellaini 24'; Pereira (yellow card) 41'	Stadium: Dean Court; Attendance: 11,334; Referee: Anthony Taylor

19 December 2015 17	West Bromwich Albion	1–2	Bournemouth	West Bromwich
15:00 GMT	McClean (red card) 34'; Evans (yellow card) 39'; Fletcher (yellow card) 64'; McAuley 79'; Rondón (red card) 90'	Report	Smith 52', (yellow card) 90'; Daniels 87' (pen.)	Stadium: The Hawthorns; Attendance: 26,127; Referee: Mike Dean

26 December 2015 18	Bournemouth	0–0	Crystal Palace	Bournemouth
15:00 GMT	Arter (yellow card) 36'	Report		Stadium: Dean Court; Attendance: 11,218; Referee: Michael Oliver

28 December 2015 19	Arsenal	2–0	Bournemouth	London
17:30 GMT	Gabriel 27'; Ramsey (yellow card) 30'; Chambers (yellow card) 61'; Özil 63'	Report		Stadium: Emirates Stadium; Attendance: 59,983; Referee: Roger East

2 January 2016 20	Leicester City	0–0	Bournemouth	Leicester
15:00 GMT	Albrighton (yellow card) 62'	Report	Arter (yellow card) 34'; Francis (red card) 57'	Stadium: King Power Stadium; Attendance: 32,006; Referee: Andre Marriner

12 January 2016 21	Bournemouth	1–3	West Ham United	Bournemouth
19:45 GMT	Arter 17'; Smith (yellow card) 66'	Report	Payet 67', (yellow card) 68'; Valencia 74', 84'	Stadium: Dean Court; Attendance: 11,071; Referee: Martin Atkinson

16 January 2016 22	Bournemouth	3–0	Norwich City	Bournemouth
15:00 GMT	Gosling 10'; Arter (yellow card) 48'; Daniels 54' (pen.); Afobe 75'	Report	Rudd (yellow card) 43'	Stadium: Dean Court; Attendance: 11,065; Referee: Robert Madley

23 January 2016 23	Sunderland	1–1	Bournemouth	Sunderland
15:00 GMT	Van Aanholt 45+1'; Jones (yellow card) 89'	Report	Afobe 13'; Surman (yellow card) 18'	Stadium: Stadium of Light; Attendance: 41,367; Referee: Roger East

2 February 2016 24	Crystal Palace	1–2	Bournemouth	London
20:00 GMT	Dann 27', (yellow card) 51'; Zaha (yellow card) 43'; Jedinak (yellow card) 69'	Report	Pugh 34'; Afobe 57'; Francis (yellow card) 65'; Cook (yellow card) 76'; Smith (yellow card) 71'; Grabban (yellow card) 90+1'	Stadium: Selhurst Park; Attendance: 24,855; Referee: Mike Jones

7 February 2016 25	Bournemouth	0–2	Arsenal	Bournemouth
13:30 GMT		Report	Flamini (yellow card) 9'; Özil 23'; Chamberlain 24'	Stadium: Dean Court; Attendance: 11,357; Referee: Kevin Friend

13 February 2016 26	Bournemouth	1–3	Stoke City	Bournemouth
15:00 GMT	Pugh (yellow card) 36'; Ritchie 57'; Surman (yellow card) 74'; Francis (yellow card) 85'; Arter (yellow card) 90'	Report	Imbula 9', (yellow card) 90'; Diouf (yellow card) 21'; Affelay 52'; Joselu 55'	Stadium: Dean Court; Attendance: 10,683; Referee: Graham Scott

27 February 2016 27	Watford	0–0	Bournemouth	Watford
15:00 GMT	Watson (yellow card) 78'; Behrami (yellow card) 83'; Cathcart (yellow card) 87'	Report	Surman (yellow card) 85'	Stadium: Vicarage Road; Attendance: 20,831; Referee: Anthony Taylor

1 March 2016 28	Bournemouth	2–0	Southampton	Bournemouth
19:45 GMT	Cook 31'; Afobe 79'	Report		Stadium: Dean Court; Attendance: 11,033; Referee: Mike Dean

5 March 2016 29	Newcastle United	1–3	Bournemouth	Newcastle upon Tyne
15:00 GMT	Pérez (yellow card) 56', (goal) 80'	Report	Taylor 28' (o.g.); Cook (yellow card) 45'; King 70'; Gosling (yellow card) 75'; Grabban (yellow card) 89'; Daniels 90'	Stadium: St James' Park; Attendance: 52,107; Referee: Paul Tierney

12 March 2016 30	Bournemouth	3–2	Swansea City	Bournemouth
15:00 GMT	Gosling (yellow card) 34'; Gradel 37'; King 50'; Cook 78'	Report	Barrow 39'; Sigurðsson 62'	Stadium: Dean Court; Attendance: 11,179; Referee: Roger East

20 March 2016 31	Tottenham Hotspur	3–0	Bournemouth	London
16:00 GMT	Kane 1', 16'; Eriksen 52'	Report	Francis (yellow card) 59'	Stadium: White Hart Lane; Attendance: 36,084; Referee: Neil Swarbrick

2 April 2016 32	Bournemouth	0–4	Manchester City	Bournemouth
15:00 BST		Report	Fernando 7', (yellow card) 89'; De Bruyne 12'; Agüero 19'; Kolarov 90+3'	Stadium: Dean Court; Attendance: 11,192; Referee: Robert Madley

9 April 2016 33	Aston Villa	1–2	Bournemouth	Birmingham
15:00 BST	Gueye (yellow card) 36'; Ayew 85', (yellow card) 90'	Report	Cook (yellow card) 27', (goal) 45+2'; Daniels (yellow card) 32'; King 74'	Stadium: Villa Park; Attendance: 31,057; Referee: Martin Atkinson

17 April 2016 34	Bournemouth	1–2	Liverpool	Bournemouth
13:30 BST	King 90+3'	Report	Firmino 41'; Sturridge 45+2'	Stadium: Dean Court; Attendance: 11,386; Referee: Mike Jones

23 April 2016 35	Bournemouth	1–4	Chelsea	Bournemouth
15:00 BST	Elphick 36'; Ritchie (yellow card) 89'	Report	Pedro 5'; Hazard 34', 90+1'; Willian 71'	Stadium: Dean Court; Attendance: 11,365; Referee: Roger East

30 April 2016 36	Everton	2–1	Bournemouth	Liverpool
15:00 BST	Cleverley 7'; Gibson (yellow card) 62'; Baines 64'	Report	Pugh 9'	Stadium: Goodison Park; Attendance: 38,345; Referee: Neil Swarbrick

7 May 2016 37	Bournemouth	1–1	West Bromwich Albion	Bournemouth
15:00 BST	Elphick (yellow card) 42'; Arter (yellow card) 70'; Ritchie 82'	Report	Rondón 15'; Gardner (penalty missed) 27'; Evans (yellow card) 62'; Yacob (yellow card) 63'	Stadium: Dean Court; Attendance: 11,040; Referee: Mark Clattenburg

17 May 2016 38	Manchester United	3–1	Bournemouth	Manchester
20:00 BST	Rooney 43'; Mata (yellow card) 66'; Rashford 74'; Young 87'	Report	Smalling 90+3' (o.g.)	Stadium: Old Trafford; Attendance: 74,363; Referee: Jonathan Moss

=== FA Cup ===
Win Draw Loss Postponed

9 January 2016 Third round	Birmingham City	1–2	Bournemouth	Birmingham
15:00 GMT	Morrison 40', (yellow card) 44'	Report	Tomlin 44' (pen.); Murray 85'	Stadium: St Andrew's; Attendance: 13,140; Referee: Mike Jones

30 January 2016 Fourth round	Portsmouth	1–2	Bournemouth	Portsmouth
15:00 GMT	Burgess (yellow card) 22'; Roberts 43'	Report	King 71'; Pugh 83'; O'Kane (yellow card) 90+1'	Stadium: Fratton Park; Attendance: 18,901; Referee: Mike Dean

20 February 2016 Fifth round	Bournemouth	0–2	Everton	Bournemouth
17:15 GMT	Gosling (yellow card) 45+1'; Iturbe (yellow card) 66'; King (yellow card) 68'	Report	McCarthy (yellow card) 18'; Barkley 55'; Lukaku 76'	Stadium: Dean Court; Attendance: 11,404; Referee: Martin Atkinson

=== League Cup ===
Bournemouth entered in the second round and were drawn away against Hartlepool United. The third round draw was made on 25 August 2015 live on Sky Sports by Charlie Nicholas and Phil Thompson. Bournemouth were drawn away to Preston North End.

25 August 2015 Second round	Hartlepool United	0–4	Bournemouth	Hartlepool
19:45 BST		Report	Kermorgant 30'; Gosling 34'; Stanislas 44', 64'	Stadium: Victoria Park; Attendance: 4,890; Referee: Carl Boyeson

22 September 2015 Third round	Preston North End	2–2 (2–3 p)	Bournemouth	Preston
19:45 BST	Hugill 84'; Johnson 118' (pen.)	Report	MacDonald 23'; Pugh 96'	Stadium: Deepdale; Attendance: 5,643; Referee: Nigel Miller
	Penalties
	Hugill (penalty missed); Keane (penalty scored); Reid (penalty scored); Browne (penalty missed); Johnson (penalty missed)		(penalty scored) Stanislas; (penalty scored) Cook; (penalty missed) Gosling; (penalty scored) Pugh

28 October 2015 Fourth round	Liverpool	1–0	Bournemouth	Liverpool
19:45 GMT	Clyne 17'; Allen (yellow card) 61'	Report	MacDonald (yellow card) 80'	Stadium: Anfield; Attendance: 41,948; Referee: Mike Jones

=== Hampshire Senior Cup ===
On the Hampshire FA website, the second round details were announced; Bournemouth faced Havant & Waterlooville.

22 September 2015 Second round	Havant & Waterlooville	4–0	Bournemouth	Havant
19:45 BST		Report		Stadium: West Leigh Park
