= Ian Bermingham =

Irish footballer (born 1989)

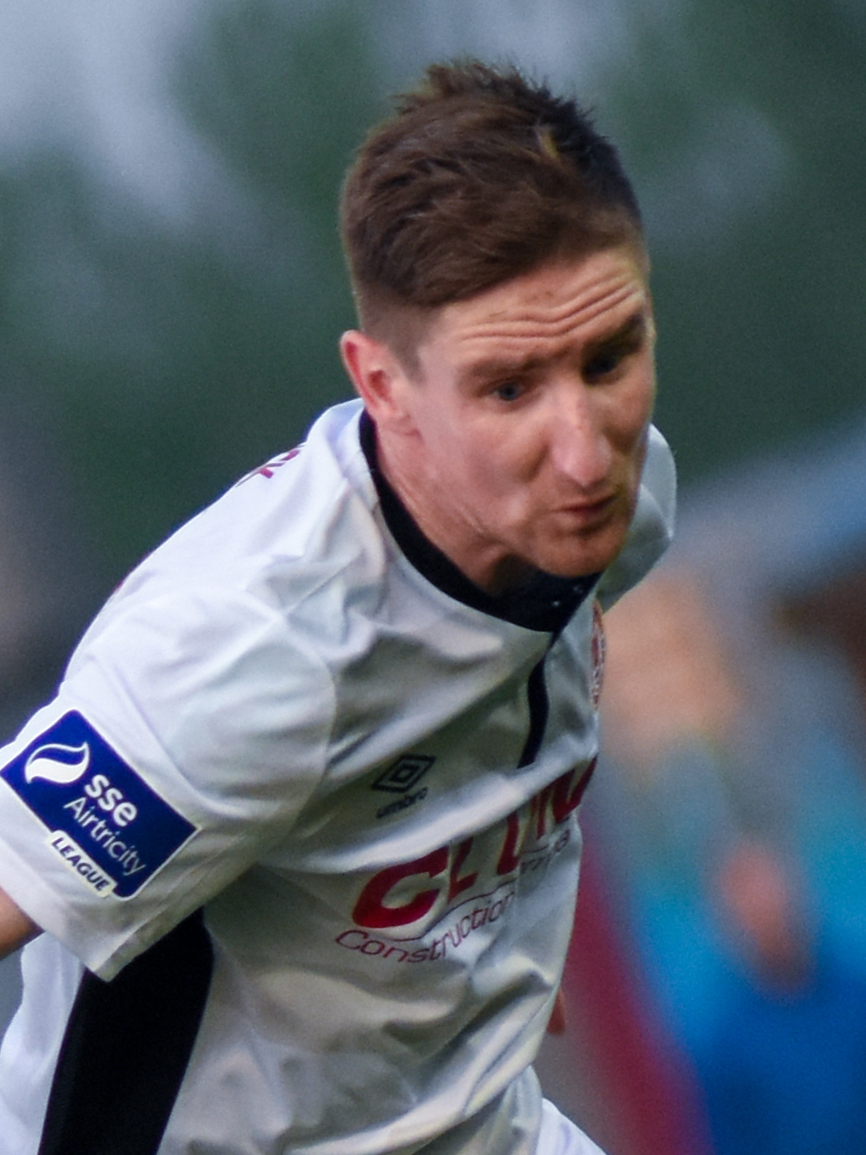
- Bermingham in action for St Patrick's Athletic away to Galway United in 2016.

Personal information
- Full name: Ian Bermingham
- Date of birth: 16 June 1989 (age 37)
- Place of birth: Ballyfermot, Dublin, Ireland
- Height: 1.77 m (5 ft 10 in)
- Position: Left back

Youth career
- Ballyfermot United
- Lourdes Celtic

Senior career*
Years	Team	Apps	(Gls)
2007–2008	UCD	46	(1)
2009	Shamrock Rovers	16	(0)
2010–2022	St Patrick's Athletic	354	(13)
Total		416	(14)

International career
2007	Republic of Ireland U18		
2008	Republic of Ireland U19		
2008–2009	Republic of Ireland U21	3	(0)
- * Club domestic league appearances and goals

Ian Bermingham (born 6 June 1989) is an Irish former professional footballer who spent 13 seasons with League of Ireland Premier Division club St Patricks Athletic, where he was club captain and is the second all-time appearance record holder. He previously spent two seasons at UCD and a season at Shamrock Rovers.

== Club career ==
=== Early career ===
Raised in Ballyfermot, Bermingham began playing football with his local side Ballyfermot United. His form with his local club was good enough to earn a move to fellow Dublin club Lourdes Celtic where he played alongside future League of Ireland players including a future St Patrick's Athletic teammate Derek Foran, as well as earning his first Republic of Ireland Underage callups.

=== UCD ===
Bermingham was signed by UCD manager Pete Mahon in April 2007. At Belfield Park he went straight into the first team squad and made his debut as a late substitute against Waterford United on 6 April 2007. Bermingham made his first start for the club in a League of Ireland Cup game against Kildare County later that month and was a first team regular from then, solving UCD's long-term search for a left back. His first goal came on 3 September 2007 when he scored in a 1–0 win away to soon to be champions Drogheda United at United Park. His displays impressed other clubs as well, and both Stockport County and Gretna expressed an interest in signing him. Stockport were rumoured to have signed him, but Bermingham ended months of speculation by signed a new contract and retained his left back berth at UCD going into the 2008 season. He made 26 appearances in all competitions over the season, in a year that saw his side finish bottom of the league, relegated to the League of Ireland First Division. Following UCD's relegation, Bermingham opted to leave the club, with his preference being to play in the League of Ireland Premier Division.

=== Shamrock Rovers ===
He signed for Shamrock Rovers on 23 February 2009. He made his debut on 6 March 2009 in a 0–0 draw away to Bray Wanderers at the Carlisle Grounds. Bermingham made 18 appearances for the Hoops in their inaugural season in Tallaght Stadium including the historic first game, and against Real Madrid, a game in which he marked Cristiano Ronaldo and prevented him from scoring on his debut for the club.

=== St Patricks Athletic ===
==== 2010 season ====
Bermingham signed for St Patrick's Athletic on 6 January 2010, signed by his former UCD manager Pete Mahon. He made his debut on 26 February 2010, in a 1–1 draw with Linfield in the Setanta Sports Cup. Bermingham scored his first goal for Pat's in a 2–0 win over his old club Shamrock Rovers in the Dublin derby on 16 March 2010, securing Pat's first ever win at Tallaght Stadium. He was part of the side that reached the 2010 Setanta Cup Final, including playing the full 90 minutes as Pat's were defeated 1–0 by Bohemians at Tallaght Stadium on 15 May 2010. Bermingham's next goal came on 27 August 2010, scoring in a 2–0 win over Belgrove in the FAI Cup. His first season with the Saints saw them finish in 5th place in the league, while in the FAI Cup, they missed out on a place in the first ever final at the Aviva Stadium when they were narrowly beaten by Shamrock Rovers after a replay at the Semi Final stage. He made 35 appearances in all competitions over the season, scoring 2 goals.

==== 2011 season ====
He signed a new contract with the Inchicore club on 6 December 2010 to stay for the 2011 season. Due to the demise of Sporting Fingal, Pat's stepped into their place, allowing Bermingham see his first taste of European football. He featured in all 6 games of the club's UEFA Europa League campaign as his side knocked out ÍBV of Iceland and Shakhter Karagandy of Kazakhstan, before being knocked out by Karpaty Lviv of Ukraine in the Third Qualifying Round. He made 2 appearances in the Leinster Senior Cup which Pat's won on 10 October 2011, beating Bohemians in the final at Dalymount Park, resulting in a first career medal for Bermingham. Pat's finished up in 4th place, securing UEFA Europa League football for the next season, while they were once again knocked out of the FAI Cup at the Semi Final stage after a replay, this time against Dublin rivals Shelbourne. Bermingham made 41 appearances over the season.

==== 2012 season ====
After making 52 league appearances for the Saints over two seasons, Bermingham signed a new one-year contract with the club under new manager Liam Buckley on 21 January 2012. The season was a success with the team playing excellent football under their new manager, resulting in some memorable performances including a famous 5–1 win over Shamrock Rovers. They continued their form into their UEFA Europa League campaign, once again knocking out ÍBV of Iceland, before facing NK Široki Brijeg of Bosnia and Herzegovina, drawing 1–1 away and winning 2–1 at home in a game in which made his 100th appearance for the club on 26 July 2012. That win earned Bermingham and his Pat's side a trip to Germany to face Bundesliga giants Hannover 96, who knocked them out at the Third Qualifying Round stage, despite Pat's earning many plaudits for their performance at Hannover's 50,000 seater AWD-Arena. Pat's league title dream was ended on 13 October 2012 when they lost 3–2 away to Sligo Rovers, resulting in the title for Sligo as Pat's later slipped to third place in the remaining dead rubber games of the season. Bermingham was named in the PFAI Team of the Year for 2012 on 25 October 2012. After losing Semi Final Replays the previous two seasons in the FAI Cup, Pat's reached the 2012 FAI Cup Final but were beaten 3–2 after extra time by Derry City at the Aviva Stadium in what was Bermingham's first cup final. On 9 November 2012, Bermingham was named St Patrick's Athletic Player of the Season for 2012.

==== 2013 season ====
Bermingham signed a new 1-year contract with the club on 20 November 2012. 2013 was a dominant year for Bermingham and Pat's as they went head to head with Dundalk in the title race throughout the season. Their UEFA Europa League campaign ended early however, losing 4–3 on aggregate to Žalgiris of Lithuania. His 100th league appearance for the club was on 2 August 2013 against Drogheda United. He played the full 90 minutes on 9 August 2013 as his side recorded a famous 4–0 win over Shamrock Rovers at Tallaght Stadium, with Conan Byrne scoring all 4 goals. A month later he made his 150th appearance for the club was on 20 September 2013 in a vital 2–0 win over title rivals Dundalk at Richmond Park. On 13 October 2013, exactly a year to the day since Pat's and Bermingham watched Sligo Rovers win the league against them, they beat Sligo 2–0 at Richmond Park to secure the 2013 League of Ireland Premier Division title. In the 31 games it took them to win the league, Pat's defence of Bermingham, Ger O'Brien, Conor Kenna, Kenny Browne and goalkeeper Brendan Clarke amazingly conceded just 15 goals. Bermingham was named in the PFAI Team of the Year alongside 5 of his teammates for 2013. On 20 October 2013, he was an unused substitute in the 2013 Leinster Senior Cup Final as his side lost 1–0 to Shamrock Rovers, having lifted the league trophy just 42 hours previously, following a 1–1 draw with Derry City.

==== 2014 season ====
He signed a new contract with the club on 17 November 2013. Bermingham was part of the team that won the 2014 President of Ireland's Cup, the first ever edition of the competition, beating cup winners Sligo Rovers 1–0 at Richmond Park, thanks to a Keith Fahey goal. Bermingham scored his first goal in 4 years on 3 May 2014, scoring an equaliser and later winning a penalty for his side's second goal in a 2–2 draw with Sligo Rovers. On 16 July 2014, he made his first appearance in the UEFA Champions League, assisting Christy Fagan's goal in a 1–1 draw away to Legia Warsaw at the Polish Army Stadium. Bermingham scored his second goal of the season on 15 August 2014, scoring the winner in a 3–2 victory of his first club UCD. He made one appearance in the team's Leinster Senior Cup campaign, which they won on 9 September 2014. On 21 October 2014, he was named in the PFAI Team of the Year for the third consecutive year, alongside teammate Christy Fagan. Two years after his side were defeated by Derry City in the FAI Cup Final, Bermingham and Pat's once again faced Derry in the 2014 FAI Cup Final at the Aviva Stadium on 2 November 2014, winning 2–0, making them the first St Patrick's Athletic team to do so in 53 years.

==== 2015 season ====
He scored his first goal of the season on 9 February 2015, scoring the 4th goal of a 7–0 win over Tolka Rovers in the Leinster Senior Cup. Bermingham made his 200th appearance for Pats on 28 February 2015 when he captained the side vs Dundalk in the 2015 President's Cup at Oriel Park, a game which his side lost 2–1. He featured in both games as his side were knocked out of the UEFA Europa League at the first hurdle by Skonto Riga of Latvia. Bermingham made 3 appearances in the League of Ireland Cup but missed the final on 19 September 2015 due to suspension, as his side beat Galway United on penalties to claim the trophy. He played the full 90 minutes on the final day of the season in a 1–0 win away to Galway United that secured another UEFA Europa League campaign for the following season.

==== 2016 season ====
On 24 November 2015, he signed a new contract to remain at the club for the 2016 season. He featured in every game of the club's UEFA Europa League campaign once again, as they knocked out Jeunesse Esch of Luxembourg before losing 2–1 on aggregate to Dinamo Minsk of Belarus. After missing the 2015 League of Ireland Cup Final through suspension, he played the full game in the 2016 League of Ireland Cup Final as his side beat Limerick by 4 goals to 1 at the Markets Field to retain the trophy on 17 September 2016. Despite a disappointing season for the team that saw them finish sixth in the league, missing out on Europe, it was a positive season on a personal level for Bermingham and on 19 November 2016, he was named 2016 St Patrick's Athletic Player of the Season at the club's end of season award's night.

==== 2017 season ====
With former captain Ger O'Brien becoming the assistant manager of the first team and retiring as a player ahead of the season, Bermingham was promoted from vice captain to club captain. His first goal of the season came on 31 January 2017 when he opened the scoring in a 4–0 Leinster Senior Cup win over Bray Wanderers at the Carlisle Grounds. The 2017 season proved to be a very difficult year for the club as they battled relegation from the outset due to poor form and the change in the League of Ireland Premier Division format, it meant that there would be 3 clubs relegated directly with no playoffs, as the league was set to change from 12 teams to 10 teams from 2018 onwards. The young Pat's side suffered 5 losses and 1 draw in their opening 6 games of the season before registering their first win of the season by beating Shamrock Rovers on 25 March 2017. He scored the opening goal of the game in a 2–0 home win over relegation battling rivals Drogheda United on 12 May 2017. He helped his side earn a draw away to Limerick on 24 June 2017, when he scored to reduce their 2-goal deficit to just one, before Conan Byrne equalised with 15 minutes to play. On 25 September 2017, he opened the scoring with a header in a vital 2–0 Dublin derby win over Shamrock Rovers as the relegation battle continued. On 20 October 2017, Pat's came from 2–0 down to beat champions Cork City 4–2 with Bermingham putting his side in front in the 63rd minute.

==== 2018 season ====
He signed a new 2-year contract with the club ahead of the 2018 season, keeping him at the club until the end of 2019. He scored on the opening night of the season in a 3–2 defeat against champions Cork City at Richmond Park. On 23 March he scored the winner against Limerick in a 1–0 win for the Saints at Richmond Park. Following a run of poor results and missing out on European football for the third season in a row, manager Liam Buckley was sacked, with Bermingham hailing the man who had managed him for 7 seasons as a legend when speaking on his departure. He made 39 appearances in all competitions over the season, scoring twice.

==== 2019 season ====
2019, Bermingham's tenth season at the club, saw the team struggle with their on field performances under new manager Harry Kenny, but during the season, it was announced that Pat's would be playing UEFA Europa League football at the expense of his old club Waterford after they failed to meet UEFA's '3 year rule'. Bermingham extended his club record appearances in Europe with his 23rd and 24th appearances against IFK Norrköping of Sweden, losing 2–0 at home and 2–1 away. On 13 July 2019, Bermingham faced Premier League side Chelsea in a friendly at Richmond Park, marking FIFA World Cup Winner Pedro. After a 3–1 defeat to bottom of the table UCD in the FAI Cup, manager Harry Kenny departed the club and was replaced by Stephen O'Donnell for the remaining 7 games but the club missed out on Europe on the final day of the season to Derry City.

==== 2020 season ====
On 30 November 2019, he signed a new contract with the club for the 2020 season under new manager Stephen O'Donnell. He started pre-season off strongly, scoring his first goal since March 2018 in a 5–1 win over Cobh Ramblers in a friendly on 16 January 2020. He made his 400th appearance in all competitions for the club on 6 March, replacing Shane Griffin from the bench in a 1–0 win over Cork City. Bermingham became the record league appearance holder for St Patrick's Athletic on 22 August 2020, when he made his 309th league appearance for the club against Bohemians, surpassing Paul Osam's record of 308, a record that stood until it was taken by Chris Forrester in October 2026. He played in 12 of the club's 19 league and cup games over the course of the shortened season due to the Coronavirus pandemic, as his side missed out on European football on the final day of the season, finishing in 6th place.

==== 2021 season ====
Bermingham signed a new contract with the club on 5 January 2021, keeping him at the club for a twelfth consecutive season. On 3 May 2021, he scored his first goal since March 2018 by heading home from a 95th minute corner to level the score at 1–1 away to Sligo Rovers and keep his side unbeaten after 9 games. On 28 November 2021 Bermingham played the full 120 minutes of the 2021 FAI Cup Final, beating rivals Bohemians 4–3 on penalties following a 1–1 draw after extra time in front of a record FAI Cup Final crowd of 37,126 at the Aviva Stadium to become just the third St Pat's captain in history to lift the FAI Cup after Tommy Dunne in 1959 & 1961 and Ger O'Brien in 2014.

==== 2022 season ====
On 9 December 2021, Bermingham signed a contract for the 2022 season, his thirteenth at the club. Bermingham made his 350th league appearance for the club and 450th club appearance in all competitions on 23 May 2022 in a 3–0 win over Bohemians at Richmond Park. On 31 August 2022, Bermingham announced via a club announcement that 2022 would be his final season after 13 years at the club, revealing that he agreed with club owner Garrett Kelleher that it would be his final season when signing his final contract with the club, also confirming that he would be retiring from professional football. His final appearance in professional football came in a 4–0 win over Shelbourne on 6 November 2022, with Bermingham coming on at half time as a substitute before being subbed off in the last minute of the game to a guard of honour from his teammates.

After retiring from playing professionally, he signed for local club ROC Celtic in Ballyfermot, alongside former Pats teammate Killian Brennan.

== International career ==
Bermingham has been capped at various underage levels for the Republic of Ireland. While at Lourdes he represented the Republic of Ireland U18's as they won the Lisbon Trophy in March 2007. He received a call-up to the U21 squad for the first time in August 2008 for a friendly match against Austria but was forced to pull out due to injury. He was once again named in the U21 squad for the qualifying games against Bulgaria and Portugal but was still suffering from the same injury that forced him out of the previous game. He finally made his debut for the U21 team when he played the full 90 minutes in a friendly game against Lithuania in October 2008. Bermingham earned his first competitive cap in Turners Cross, Cork against Turkey in March 2009.

== Personal life ==
Bermingham has a keen interest in horseracing and was part owner of Cubomania, a horse that was ridden by Davy Russell at the 2019 Cheltenham Festival. He attended primary school in Mary Queen of Angels National School in his hometown of Ballyfermot and regularly visits his old school and others in the area as part of St Patrick's Athletic's community work. After winning the 2021 FAI Cup, Bermingham revealed that his first child had been born just 2 days before the Final, stating that "all of my dreams came true in a weekend. I can't believe it to be quite honest with you, it's the best weekend of my life".

== Coaching career ==
During his playing career, Bermingham began his coaching career, assisting with St Patrick's Athletic's Under 15 National League side in 2019 and 2020.

On 9 January 2021 he was announced as Senior Head Coach of Leinster Senior League side Collinstown.

On 5 October 2022, it was announced that Bermingham had been appointed Football Partnership Manager at St Patrick's Athletic, a newly created full-time role within the club which involves the daily management of the football partnership between Pat's and Cherry Orchard.

On 26 March 2025, it was announced that Bermingham had been appointed as Head of Academy Football at St Patrick's Athletic.

== Career statistics ==
As of 7 November 2022

Appearances and goals by club, season and competition
Club	Season	League			Cup		League Cup		Europe		Other		Total	
Club	Season	Division	Apps	Goals	Apps	Goals	Apps	Goals	Apps	Goals	Apps	Goals	Apps	Goals
UCD	2007	LOI Premier Division	22	1	4	0	4	0	—		—		30	1
UCD	2008	LOI Premier Division	24	0	2	0	0	0	—		—		26	0
UCD	Total		46	1	6	0	4	0	—		—		56	1
Shamrock Rovers	2009	LOI Premier Division	16	0	2	0	0	0	—		—		18	0
St Patrick's Athletic	2010	LOI Premier Division	25	1	5	1	2	0	—		3 (Note: Appearances in Setanta Sports Cup)	0	35	2
St Patrick's Athletic	2011	LOI Premier Division	27	0	4	0	1	0	6 (Note: Appearances in UEFA Europa League)	0	3 (Note: 2 appearances in Leinster Senior Cup & 1 appearance in Setanta Sports Cup)	0	41	0
St Patrick's Athletic	2012	LOI Premier Division	26	0	5	0	1	0	6	0	2	0	40	0
St Patrick's Athletic	2013	LOI Premier Division	33	0	3	0	0	0	2	0	2	0	40	0
St Patrick's Athletic	2014	LOI Premier Division	30	2	5	0	0	0	2 (Note: Appearances in UEFA Champions League)	0	5 (Note: 1 appearance in Leinster Senior Cup, 1 appearance in President of Ireland's Cup & 3 appearances in Setanta Sports Cup)	0	42	2
St Patrick's Athletic	2015	LOI Premier Division	30	0	2	0	3	0	2	0	4 (Note: 3 appearances, 1 goal in Leinster Senior Cup & 1 appearance in President of Ireland's Cup)	1	41	1
St Patrick's Athletic	2016	LOI Premier Division	31	3	3	0	3	0	4	0	1 (Note: Appearances in Leinster Senior Cup)	0	42	3
St Patrick's Athletic	2017	LOI Premier Division	31	4	2	0	2	0	—		1	1	36	5
St Patrick's Athletic	2018	LOI Premier Division	34	2	2	0	0	0	—		3	0	39	2
St Patrick's Athletic	2019	LOI Premier Division	35	0	2	0	1	0	2	0	0	0	40	0
St Patrick's Athletic	2020	LOI Premier Division	11	0	1	0	—		—		—		12	0
St Patrick's Athletic	2021	LOI Premier Division	29	1	5	0	—		—		—		34	1
St Patrick's Athletic	2022	LOI Premier Division	12	0	0	0	—		0 (Note: Appearances in UEFA Europa Conference League)	0	0 (Note: Appearance in President of Ireland's Cup)	0	12	0
St Patrick's Athletic	Total		354	13	39	1	13	0	24	0	24	2	454	16
Career total			416	14	47	1	17	0	24	0	24	2	528	17

== Honours ==
=== Club ===
St Patrick's Athletic

- League of Ireland Premier Division: 2013
- FAI Cup: 2014, 2021
- League of Ireland Cup: 2015, 2016
- President of Ireland's Cup: 2014
- Leinster Senior Cup: 2011, 2014, 2019

=== Individual ===
- PFAI Team of the Year: 2012, 2013, 2014
- St Patrick's Athletic Player of the Year: 2012, 2016
- Shed End Invincibles Player of the Year: 2016
