= Cothen =

- Village
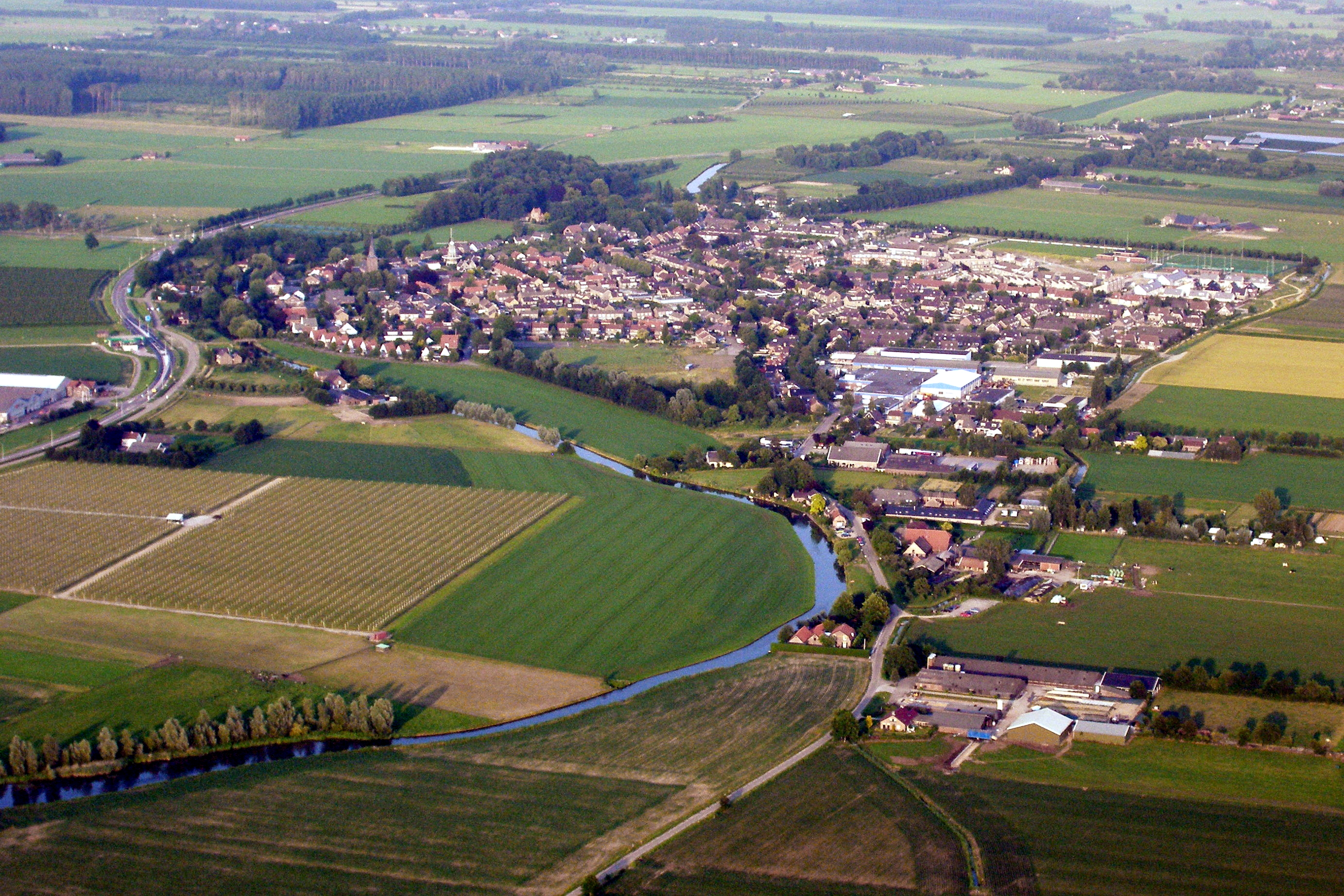
- Cothen from the air

- Coat of arms

- Location in the Netherlands Cothen (Netherlands)
- Coordinates: 51°59′46″N 5°18′35″E
- Country: Netherlands
- Province: Utrecht
- Municipality: Wijk bij Duurstede

Area
  - Total: 11.93 km^{2} (4.61 sq mi)
- Elevation: 4 m (13 ft)

Population (2021)
  - Total: 3,275
  - Density: 274.5/km^{2} (711.0/sq mi)
- Time zone: UTC+1 (CET)
  - Summer (DST): UTC+2 (CEST)
- Postal code: 3945
- Dialing code: 0343

Cothen is a village in the Dutch province of Utrecht. It is a part of the municipality of Wijk bij Duurstede, and lies about 10 km (6 mi) southeast of Houten.

The skyline of Cothen is characterized by a church and a windmill called Oog In 't Zeil.

== History ==
The village was first mentioned in the 12th century Coten, and means "little house/farm". Cothen developed into a stretched out esdorp along the Kromme Rijn. Castle Rhijnestein was located on the other side of the river. The tower of the castle dates from the 14th century. The current building dates from 1873. The oldest parts of the Dutch Reformed Church are from the 13th century. The church burned down in 1673, and was rebuilt in 1735 and extended in 1890.

In 1840, Cothen was home to 665 people. The grist mill Oog In 't Zeil was constructed in 1869. In 1904, an engine was installed in case there wasn't enough wind. In 1936, the top was removed, and only the base remained. In 1985, the remainder burnt down, and the entire windmill was rebuilt in 1987. It is still sometimes for grinding. The village used to be a separate municipality. In 1996, it became a part of Wijk bij Duurstede.

== Gallery ==
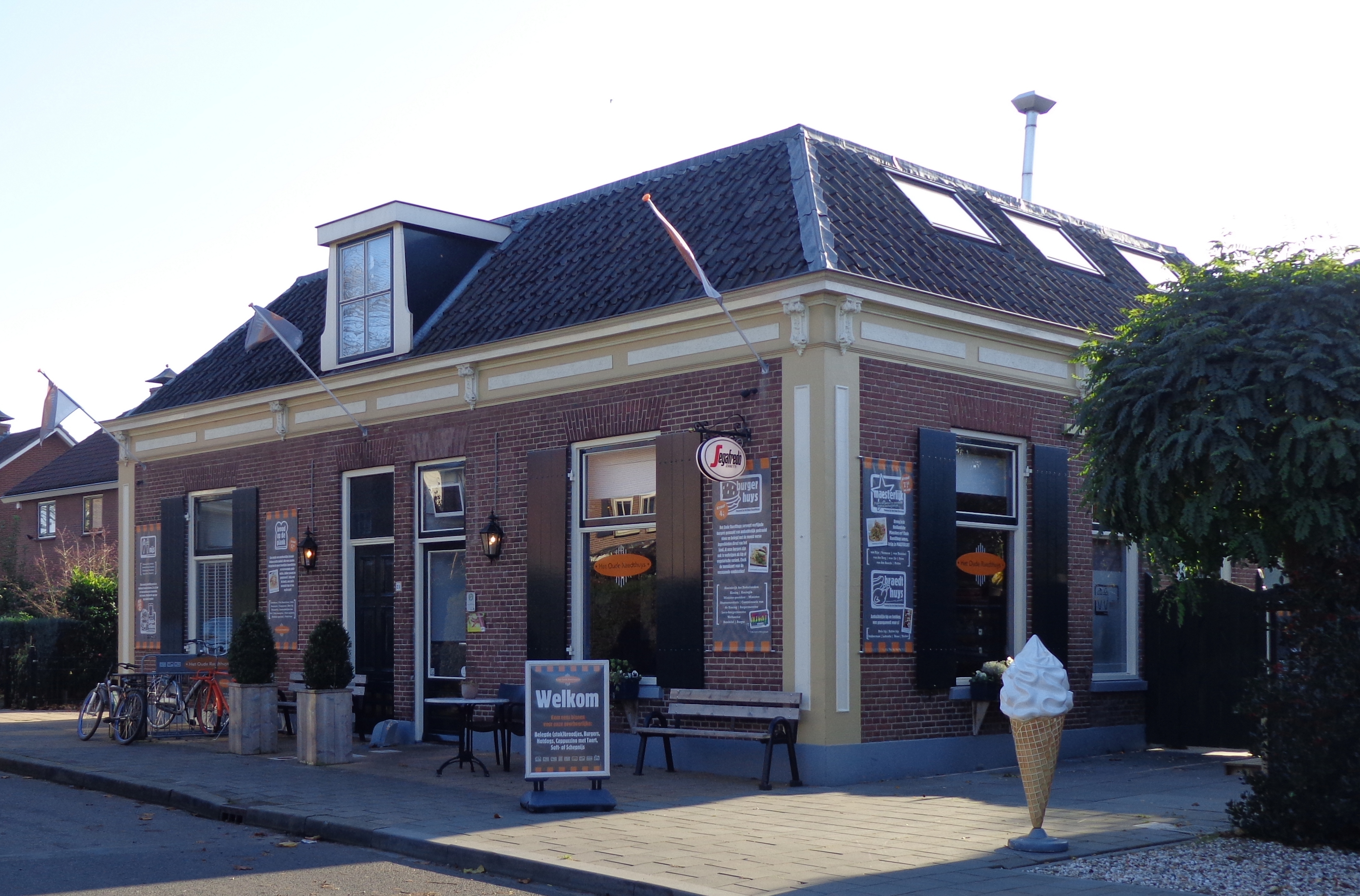
Snack bar in Cothen

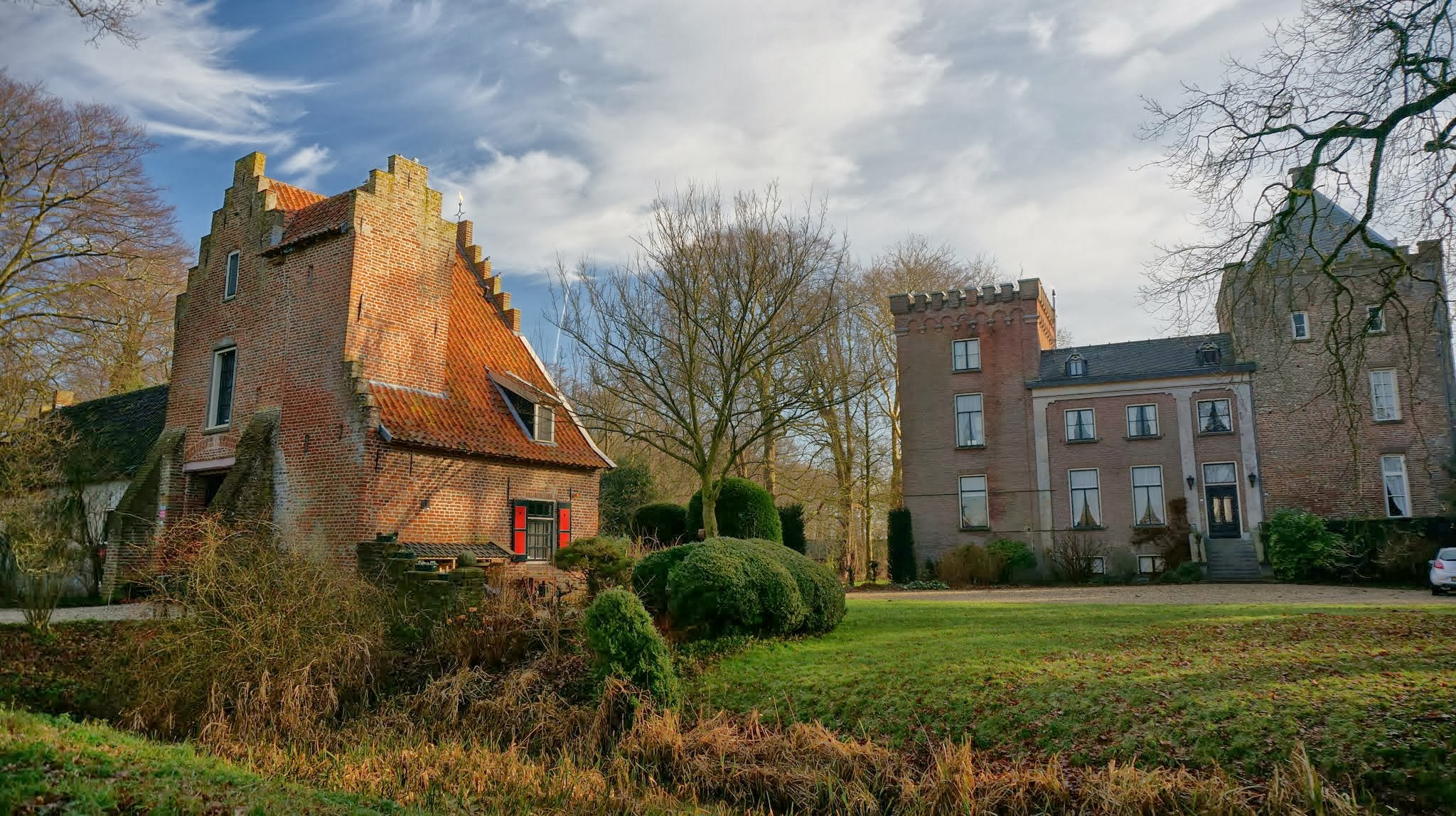
Castle Rhijnestein

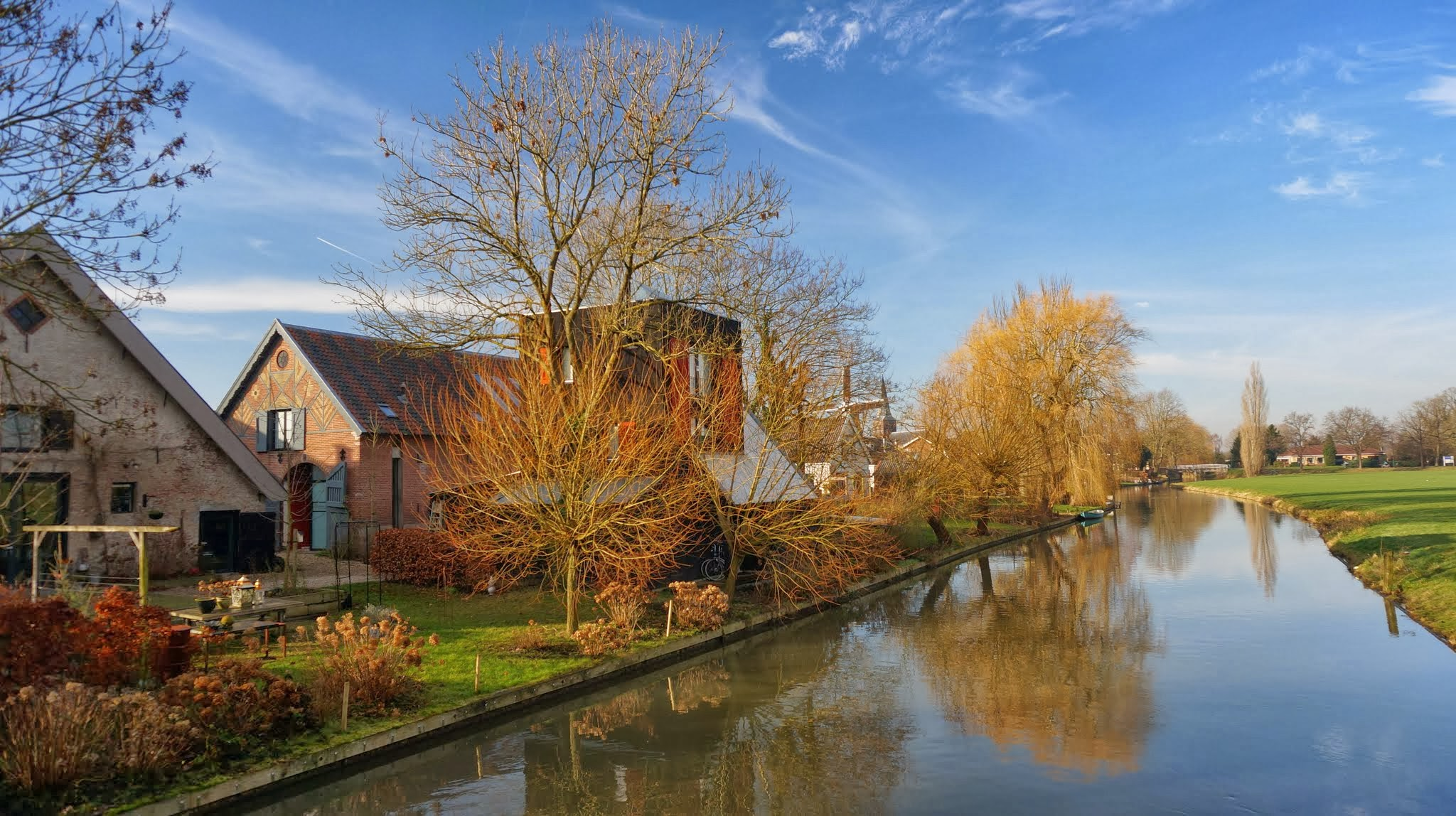
View along the canal

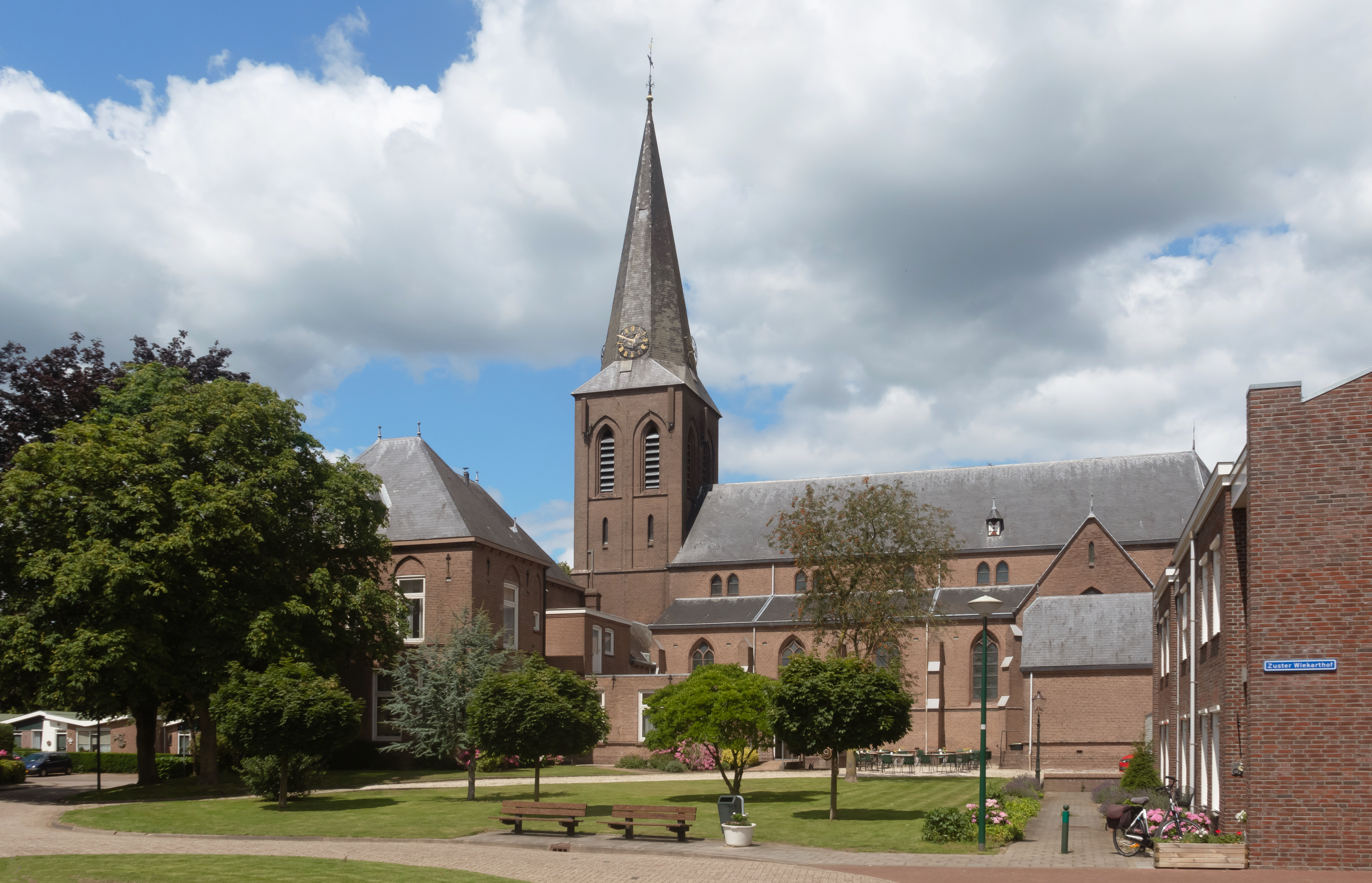
Church: the Sint-Petrus and Pauluskerk
