= 2016 League of Ireland Cup final =

- Event: 2016 League of Ireland Cup
Limerick	St Patrick's Athletic
1	4
- Date: 17 September 2016
- Venue: Markets Field, Limerick
- Man of the Match: Conan Byrne
- Referee: Rob Rogers
- Attendance: 4,362

The 2016 League of Ireland Cup final was the final match of the 2016 League of Ireland Cup, played between Limerick and defending champions St Patrick's Athletic. The match was played on 17 September 2016 at 5.30 pm. Limerick's route to the final involved them beating fellow First Division side Cobh Ramblers, before beating Premier Division sides Wexford Youths, Galway United and Derry City. St Pat's however were drawn away from home in every round as they knocked out Dundalk, Bray Wanderers and Shamrock Rovers en route to the final. Limerick lead at half time thanks to a terrific Lee Lynch strike but Pats hit back in the second half and equalised through Christy Fagan 20 minutes into the half. The game had a dramatic final 6 minutes as the Saints scored 3 goals through Conan Byrne, Jamie McGrath and Graham Kelly to retain the trophy.

== Match ==
17 September 2016
17:30 GMT

Limerick	1–4	St Patrick's Athletic
Lee Lynch 17'; Aaron Greene (yellow card) 53'; Paudie O'Connor (yellow card) 66'		Conan Byrne (yellow card) 58'; Christy Fagan 65'; Billy Dennehy (yellow card) 66'; Conan Byrne 84'; Jamie McGrath 88'; Graham Kelly (yellow card) 89'; Graham Kelly 90+2'

Markets Field
Attendance: 4,362
Referee: Rob Rogers

Limerick	St Patrick's Athletic

GK	1	(Bermuda) Freddy Hall
RB	2	(Republic of Ireland) Shaun Kelly		(substituted off) 67'
CB	24	(Republic of Ireland) Paudie O'Connor	(yellow card) 66'
CB	3	(England) Robbie Williams
LB	14	(Republic of Ireland) Sean Russell
CM	8	(Republic of Ireland) Shane Duggan (c)
CM	6	(Republic of Ireland) Paul O'Conor
CM	7	(Republic of Ireland) Lee Lynch
RW	16	(Republic of Ireland) Stephen Kenny		(substituted off) 79'
ST	20	(Republic of Ireland) Chris Mulhall		(substituted off) 70'
LW	10	(Republic of Ireland) Aaron Greene	(yellow card) 53'
Substitutes:
GK	20	(Republic of Ireland) Tommy Holland
ST	9	(Republic of Ireland) John O'Flynn		(substituted on) 70'
RW	12	(Republic of Ireland) Garbhan Coughlan		(substituted on) 79'
CB	15	(Republic of Ireland) Tony Whitehead
LW	11	(Republic of Ireland) Shane Treacy		(substituted on) 67'
ST	19	(Republic of Ireland) Ross Mann
CM	25	(Republic of Ireland) Sean McSweeney
Manager:
(Republic of Ireland) Martin Russell

GK	16	(Republic of Ireland) Conor O'Malley
RB	2	(Republic of Ireland) Ger O'Brien (c)
CB	22	(Republic of Ireland) Michael Barker
CB	5	(Republic of Ireland) Seán Hoare
LB	3	(Republic of Ireland) Ian Bermingham
CM	14	(Republic of Ireland) Graham Kelly	(yellow card) 89'	90+2'
CM	12	(Republic of Ireland) Lee Desmond
CM	19	(Republic of Ireland) Jamie McGrath	88'
RW	7	(Republic of Ireland) Conan Byrne	(yellow card) 58'	84'
ST	9	(Republic of Ireland) Christy Fagan	65'	(substituted off) 85'
LW	20	(Republic of Ireland) Billy Dennehy	(yellow card) 66'	(substituted off) 88'
Substitutes:
GK	1	(Republic of Ireland) Brendan Clarke
ST	10	(Republic of Ireland) Dinny Corcoran		(substituted on) 85'
LW	11	(Republic of Ireland) Mark Timlin		(substituted on) 88'
CB	13	(Republic of Ireland) Rory Feely
CM	18	(Republic of Ireland) Sam Verdon
LW	27	(Republic of Ireland) Steven Kinsella
CM	28	(Republic of Ireland) Jonathan Lunney
Manager:
(Republic of Ireland) Liam Buckley

== See also ==
- 2016 FAI Cup
- 2016 League of Ireland
- 2016 League of Ireland Cup
