= Rory Feely =

Irish association footballer

Personal information
- Full name: Rory Michael Feely
- Date of birth: 3 January 1997 (age 29)
- Place of birth: Brussels, Belgium
- Height: 1.91 m (6 ft 3 in)
- Positions: Right back; centre back

Team information
- Current team: Cork City
- Number: 28

Youth career
- Tramore AFC
- Athy Town
- 2014–2016: St Patrick's Athletic

Senior career*
Years	Team	Apps	(Gls)
2014–2017	St Patrick's Athletic	31	(1)
2018–2019	Waterford	62	(4)
2020	St Patrick's Athletic	17	(1)
2021–2022	Bohemians	57	(2)
2023–2025	Barrow	59	(2)
2025	Crawley Town	7	(0)
2025–	Cork City	38	(0)

International career
2017	Republic of Ireland U21	1	(0)
- * Club domestic league appearances and goals as of 16:37, 10 November 2026 (UTC)

Rory Michael Feely (born 3 January 1997) is an Irish professional footballer who plays for League of Ireland Premier Division club Cork City. He previous clubs are St Patrick's Athletic where he started his professional career, Waterford, Bohemians, Barrow & Crawley Town.

== Club career ==
=== Early career ===
Feely started playing football with Tramore AFC. He then played for Athy Town, where he represented the Kildare & District Underage League at the Kennedy Cup. His performances at the Kennedy Cup earned him a move to League of Ireland Champions St Patrick's Athletic in 2014, where he started playing with the Under 19 side. His first season was a success with Pat's winning the Under 19 SSE Airtricity League with a 3–2 win over Derry City under 19's in the final at Maginn Park, with Feely getting himself on the scoresheet. The team included several players that broke through to the Pat's first team and beyond in the League of Ireland and English Football Leagues, including Jamie McGrath, Darragh Markey, Jack Bayly, Fuad Sule, Paul Rooney and Jonathan Lunney.

=== St Patrick's Athletic ===
==== 2014–2015 ====
Feely's first involvement with the first team at St Patrick's Athletic came on 9 September 2014 when he came off the bench for the last 5 minutes of the 2014 Leinster Senior Cup Final, which saw his side win 2–1 to claim the trophy and Feely's first medal at senior level. His first senior league appearance came on 17 October 2014 when he replaced Killian Brennan in the 72nd minute of a 2–0 defeat to Athlone Town at Richmond Park. He did not feature in the first team in 2015 due to his heavy involvement with the clubs Under 19's side and also Kildare GAA Minors.

==== 2016 season ====
His next involvement with the first team came in pre-season 2016, when manager Liam Buckley decided that he would convert Feely from a right winger to a centre back and his next appearance came in February 2016, coming off the bench in a 3–1 defeat away to Bray Wanderers in the Leinster Senior Cup. Feely's first career goal at senior level came on 18 April 2016, when he scored the winner in extra time away to Dundalk in the League Cup. He was an unused substitute in the 2016 League of Ireland Cup Final as his side beat Limerick 4–1. The 2016 season saw Feely make 17 appearances across all competitions, scoring 1 goal.

==== 2017 season ====
With Feely too old for the under 19's, the 2017 season was his first season solely with the first team. His first ever League of Ireland goal came in a 1–1 draw with Galway United on 14 April 2017, when he powered home a header from a Conan Byrne corner. Feely featured 23 times across the season in a young squad that was in a relegation battle right until the final day of the season, retaining their place in the division with a 1–1 draw against Derry City at Maginn Park.

=== Waterford ===
==== 2018 season ====
Feely signed for newly promoted Waterford on 3 January 2018. Having played a handful of games at right back for St Patrick's Athletic the previous season, Waterford manager Alan Reynolds deemed it to be Feely's best position, making him his first choice in that position, as he made his debut on the opening night of the season in a 2–1 win over Derry City at the RSC. Feely's first goal for Waterford came on 18 May 2018, scoring in a 3–6 defeat at home to Limerick. He followed that up by scoring the opening goal in a 4–0 win over Derry City a week later. Along with his 2 goals, Feely made 34 appearances in all competitions for Waterford in his debut season at the club, as they finished in 4th place. Feely was named the club's Young Player of the Year after an excellent first season with the club for the 21 year old. He signed a new one-year contract with the club on 3 December 2018.

==== 2019 season ====
Feely had to wait until 13 September for his first goal of the season, helping his side to a 2–1 win over Bohemians at Dalymount Park. The season turned out to be a disappointment for the club as they finished in 6th place, but on a personal level it was a success for Feely as he featured in 40 games, scored 2 goals and was named as Waterford's Player of the Year after another impressive year for the right back.

=== Return to St Patrick's Athletic ===
On 19 November 2019, it was announced that Feely had resigned for St Patrick's Athletic under new manager Stephen O'Donnell. He made his second debut for the club on the opening night of the season against his old side Waterford. He was sent off in a Dublin derby on 28 February 2020 as his side lost 1–0 to rivals Shelbourne at Tolka Park. Feely scored his first goal since his return to the club on 26 September when he headed home a Robbie Benson corner kick in a 2–0 win over Shelbourne at Richmond Park. Feely played in all but one of the club's league and cup games over the course of the shortened season due to the Coronavirus pandemic, as his side missed out on European football on the final day of the season, finishing in 6th place.

=== Bohemians ===
On 5 January 2021, it was announced that Feely had signed for one of his brother Kevin's former clubs, Bohemians, ahead of the 2021 season. Feely scored his first goal for the club in the 2021 FAI Cup Final at the Aviva Stadium, as his side lost to his old club St Patrick's Athletic.

=== Barrow ===
On 5 January 2023, Feely signed a one-and-a-half-year contract with English Football League club Barrow. He went onto score his first goal for the club on 20 April 2024, in a 4–2 league defeat to Doncaster Rovers. On 1 May 2024, the club included Feely on their released list following the expiration of his contract. However, on 18 June 2024 it was announced Feely had signed a new one-year deal with Barrow, following a change in management at the club. On 22 October 2024, Feely scored in a 1–1 draw against Notts County at Holker Street. On 7 September 2024, Barrow's goalkeeper Paul Farman was sent-off in the 42nd minute of a 1–1 draw at home to Swindon Town, and with no goalkeeper on the bench, Feely played in goal for the remained of the match, using skills honed in his Gaelic football days, pulled off a string of several saves before eventually being beaten by a 99th-minute equaliser. On 26 November 2024, Feely captained Barrow to victory in the 2024 Lancashire Senior Cup final, scoring his penalty as Barrow defeated Burnley in a penalty shootout, in what was the club's first silverware in the competition since 1955.

=== Crawley Town ===
On 28 January 2025, Feely signed for EFL League One club Crawley Town on a one-year-contract for an undisclosed fee. He made 7 appearances for the club in the remained of the season.

=== Cork City ===
On 23 July 2025, League of Ireland Premier Division side Cork City announced that they had signed Feely from Crawley for an undisclosed fee, with his long-term contract commencing on 1 July. On 9 November 2025, he was part of the starting 11 in the 2025 FAI Cup final as his side were beaten 2–0 by Shamrock Rovers at the Aviva Stadium. He made a total of 15 appearances in all competitions by the end of the 2025 season, as the club were relegated to the League of Ireland First Division by finishing bottom of the league.

== Personal life ==
Feely was born in Brussels, Belgium, with his family living there in the 1990s while his father had a job there. When he was three years old, the family moved back to Ireland, living in Tramore, County Waterford. While living in Tramore, Feely attended Waterford matches and was also a ball boy on occasion. The family later moved to Athy, County Kildare.

Feely played Gaelic football growing up, progressing from Athy GAA to county level with Kildare GAA at Minor level, all while playing for St Patrick's Athletic at Under 19 level. He starred in the 2015 Leinster Minor Football Championship against Longford GAA at Croke Park, winning 2–15 to 1–9.

Rory's brother Kevin Feely is a former professional footballer who played with Bohemians, Charlton Athletic, Carlisle United, AFC Wimbledon and Newport County, before retiring in 2015 to return to full time education as well as playing Gaelic football with Kildare GAA.

While playing Gaelic football with Kildare GAA at Minor level, Feely was a teammate of future Normal People starring actor, Paul Mescal.

== International career ==
Feely made one appearance for the Republic of Ireland U21s, playing in a friendly against Republic of Ireland Amateurs on 11 February 2017.

== Career statistics ==
As of match played on 16 October 2026

Appearances and goals by club, season and competition
Club	Season	League			National cup (Note: Includes FAI Cup)		League cup (Note: Includes League of Ireland Cup, EFL Cup)		Europe		Other		Total	
Club	Season	Division	Apps	Goals	Apps	Goals	Apps	Goals	Apps	Goals	Apps	Goals	Apps	Goals
St Patrick's Athletic	2014	LOI Premier Division	1	0	0	0	0	0	0	0	1 (Note: Appearances in Leinster Senior Cup)	0	2	0
St Patrick's Athletic	2015	LOI Premier Division	0	0	0	0	0	0	0	0	0	0	0	0
St Patrick's Athletic	2016	LOI Premier Division	13	0	1	0	2	1	0	0	1	0	17	1
St Patrick's Athletic	2017	LOI Premier Division	17	1	0	0	3	0	—		3	0	23	1
St Patrick's Athletic	Total		31	1	1	0	5	1	0	0	5	0	42	2
Waterford	2018	LOI Premier Division	30	2	2	0	2	0	—		0	0	34	2
Waterford	2019	LOI Premier Division	32	2	3	0	3	0	—		2 (Note: 1 appearances in the Munster Senior Cup, 1 appearance in the Scottish Challenge Cup)	0	40	2
Waterford	Total		62	4	5	0	5	0	—		2	0	74	4
St Patrick's Athletic	2020	LOI Premier Division	17	1	1	0	—		—		—		18	1
Bohemians	2021	LOI Premier Division	30	0	5	1	—		4 (Note: Appearances in UEFA Europa Conference League)	0	—		39	1
Bohemians	2022	LOI Premier Division	27	2	2	0	—		—		—		29	2
Bohemians	Total		57	2	7	1	–		4	0	—		68	3
Barrow	2022–23	League Two	10	0	—		—		—		—		10	0
Barrow	2023–24	League Two	30	1	0	0	1	0	—		2 (Note: Appearances in EFL Trophy)	0	33	1
Barrow	2024–25	League Two	19	1	0	0	2	0	—		2 (Note: 1 appearance in the EFL Trophy; 1 appearance in the Lancashire Senior Cup)	0	23	1
Barrow	Total		59	2	0	0	3	0	—		4	0	66	2
Crawley Town	2024–25	League One	7	0	—		—		—		—		7	0
Cork City	2025	LOI Premier Division	12	0	5	0	—		—		—		17	0
Cork City	2026	LOI First Division	26	0	1	0	—		—		0	0	27	0
Cork City	Total		38	0	6	0	–		—		0	0	44	0
Career Total			271	10	20	1	12	1	4	0	11	0	319	12

== Honours ==
St Patrick's Athletic

- League of Ireland Cup: 2016
- Leinster Senior Cup: 2014

Barrow

- Lancashire Senior Cup: 2023–24

Individual

- Waterford Young Player of the Year: 2018
- Waterford Player of the Year: 2019
