= Graham Kelly (footballer, born 1991) =

Irish footballer

Personal information
- Date of birth: 31 October 1991 (age 35)
- Place of birth: Dublin, Ireland
- Position: Centre midfielder

Team information
- Current team: Keilor Park

Youth career
- Whitechurch United
- Lourdes Celtic
- 2008–2010: Derby County

Senior career*
| Years | Team | Apps | (Gls) |
| 2010–2011 | Derby County | 0 | (0) |
| 2010 | → Bray Wanderers (loan) | 4 | (1) |
| 2011–2012 | Bray Wanderers | 20 | (2) |
| 2013 | Salthill Devon | 10 | (2) |
| 2013 | Athlone Town | 7 | (0) |
| 2014–2015 | Bray Wanderers | 59 | (3) |
| 2016–2018 | St Patrick's Athletic | 70 | (7) |
| 2019–2025 | Essendon Royals | 102 | (50) |
| 2026– | Keilor Park | | |
- * Club domestic league appearances and goals as of 22:24, 18 October 2026 (UTC)

Graham Kelly (born 31 October 1991) is an Irish professional footballer who plays for Keilor Park. He previously played for Derby County, Bray Wanderers (2 spells), Salthill Devon, Athlone Town, St Patrick's Athletic and Essendon Royals.

== Career ==
=== Early career ===
Kelly began his career playing youth football with Whitechurch United in the Dublin suburb of Rathfarnham. He then joined another Dublin club, Lourdes Celtic in Kimmage. His performances for Lourdes led to a move to EFL Championship side Derby County in 2008. He joined fellow Irishmen Jeff Hendrick, Mark O'Brien and Ryan Connolly among others at Derby's youth setup. After playing in the youth teams for two seasons, Kelly was offered his first professional contract at the club in July 2010, given the number 40 shirt. He was loaned out to League of Ireland Premier Division club Bray Wanderers for the remaining four months of the season. He played in four league games and two Promotion/relegation play-off games for Bray, scoring once. He returned to Derby from November 2010 until January 2011, when he came to an agreement with the club to terminate his contract in order to return to Ireland and sign for Bray on a permanent basis for the 2011 season.

=== Bray Wanderers ===
After helping Wanderers stay in the Premier Division during his loan spell, Kelly signed a permanent deal with the Seagulls in February 2011. His first full season in senior football was a successful one for Kelly and Bray, as he played 17 games and scored 2 goals as his side finished 6th in the league, qualifying for the 2012 Setanta Sports Cup. 2012 turned out to be a less memorable year for Kelly and Bray however, as they finished 10th and Kelly only featured in 6 league games, 11 in all competitions.

=== First Division spell ===
Following his lack of playing time with Bray in 2012, Kelly took a step down from the Premier Division, going on an unsuccessful trial with Athlone Town and then another with UCD before signing for Galway side Salthill Devon for the 2013 League of Ireland First Division season. After 10 games and 2 goals for Salthill, Kelly joined Athlone Town, at that point managed by Roddy Collins, during the summer transfer window of 2013. Kelly featured 7 times as Athlone won the First Division title on 27 September 2013, the first silverware of his career.

=== Return to Bray ===
Following his successful year in the First Division, Kelly re-signed for Bray Wanderers ahead of the 2014 season. Bray had narrowly avoided relegation in Kelly's season away from the club and they were in a relegation battle again in 2014, avoiding the playoff spot by finishing 1 point ahead of UCD, with Kelly featuring in 30 of the club's 33 league games as he emerged as a key player for Wanderers. Kelly stayed on for the 2015 season with Bray in what turned out to be a hugely turbulent season for the club as they went through six managers during the season. Despite this, the club finished in 8th place and reached the semi-final of the 2015 FAI Cup, narrowly losing 1–0 to Cork City at the Carlisle Grounds.

=== St Patrick's Athletic ===
On 21 November 2015, Kelly was announced alongside Mark Timlin and Keith Treacy as new signings for St Patrick's Athletic ahead of the 2016 season. With the Saints expected to challenge for the league title again, or earn a European place as a minimum, the league season turned out to be a disappointment as they finished 7th. However, they got to the FAI Cup semi final and also won the 2016 League of Ireland Cup on 20 September 2016, beating Limerick 4–1 in the final with Kelly scoring the fourth in injury time. The season saw Kelly's first experience of European football as he played in all 4 games in the Saints' UEFA Europa League campaign as they knocked out Jeunesse Esch of Luxembourg before being beaten 2–1 on aggregate by Dinamo Minsk of Belarus.

With the Saints out of European competitions for the 2017 season for the first time since 2010, the club's budget took a cut and along with the new league structure that saw three clubs relegated to the First Division, the club was set for a relegation battle and Kelly sought an improvement in his game for the season, challenging himself to improve his goalscoring. With the club at the bottom of the table midway through the season, Kelly played an important role in the team in the second half of the season. He scored 4 league goals (twice as many as the previous season), including vital goals in wins against Derry City and Finn Harps as the Saints stayed up on the final day of the season with a 1–1 draw away to Derry City. On 23 November 2017, Kelly, along with Conan Byrne, Ian Bermingham and Ryan Brennan, signed a new contract with Pats to keep him at the club for the 2018 season. 2018 turned out to be a disappointing year for Kelly as he struggled to keep his place in the team, making 14 league appearances (just 6 of those being starts) with the Saints having played 31 league games, on 19 September, it was announced that Kelly had left the club by mutual consent.

== Honours ==
=== Club ===
Athlone Town

- League of Ireland First Division: 2013

St Patrick's Athletic

- League of Ireland Cup: 2016

=== Individual ===
- Essendon Royals Player of the Year: 2024

== Career statistics ==
As of match played 18 July 2025

| Club | Division | Season | League | | National Cup (Note: Includes the FA Cup, FAI Cup and Australia Cup) | | League Cup (Note: Includes the EFL Cup and League of Ireland Cup) | | Continental | | Other | | Total | |
| Club | Division | Season | Apps | Goals | Apps | Goals | Apps | Goals | Apps | Goals | Apps | Goals | Apps | Goals |
|---|---|---|---|---|---|---|---|---|---|---|---|---|---|---|
| Derby County | EFL Championship | 2010–11 | 0 | 0 | 0 | 0 | 0 | 0 | – | | – | | 0 | 0 |
| Bray Wanderers (loan) | LOI Premier Division | 2010 | 4 | 1 | 0 | 0 | 0 | 0 | – | | 2 (Note: Appearances in Promotion/relegation play-off) | 0 | 6 | 1 |
| Bray Wanderers | LOI Premier Division | 2011 | 14 | 2 | 1 | 0 | 1 | 0 | – | | 1 (Note: Appearances in Leinster Senior Cup) | 0 | 17 | 2 |
| Bray Wanderers | LOI Premier Division | 2012 | 6 | 0 | 0 | 0 | 1 | 0 | – | | 4 (Note: 2 appearances in Leinster Senior Cup and 2 appearances in Setanta Cup) | 0 | 11 | 0 |
| Bray Wanderers | Total | | 24 | 3 | 1 | 0 | 2 | 0 | – | | 7 | 0 | 34 | 3 |
| Salthill Devon | LOI First Division | 2013 | 10 | 2 | 1 | 0 | 0 | 0 | – | | – | | 11 | 2 |
| Athlone Town | LOI First Division | 2013 | 7 | 0 | 0 | 0 | 0 | 0 | – | | 0 | 0 | 7 | 0 |
| Bray Wanderers | LOI Premier Division | 2014 | 30 | 1 | 0 | 0 | 1 | 0 | – | | 1 | 0 | 32 | 1 |
| Bray Wanderers | LOI Premier Division | 2015 | 29 | 2 | 4 | 0 | 1 | 1 | – | | 1 | 0 | 35 | 3 |
| Bray Wanderers | Total | | 59 | 3 | 4 | 0 | 2 | 1 | – | | 2 | 0 | 67 | 4 |
| St Patrick's Athletic | LOI Premier Division | 2016 | 29 | 2 | 4 | 2 | 3 | 1 | 4 (Note: Appearances in UEFA Europa League) | 0 | 1 | 0 | 41 | 5 |
| St Patrick's Athletic | LOI Premier Division | 2017 | 27 | 4 | 2 | 0 | 3 | 0 | – | | 2 | 0 | 34 | 4 |
| St Patrick's Athletic | LOI Premier Division | 2018 | 14 | 1 | 0 | 0 | 1 | 1 | – | | 3 | 1 | 18 | 3 |
| St Patrick's Athletic | Total | | 70 | 7 | 6 | 2 | 7 | 2 | 4 | 0 | 6 | 1 | 93 | 12 |
| Essendon Royals | Victorian State League Division 2 NW | 2019 | 10 | 5 | 0 | 0 | – | | – | | – | | 10 | 5 |
| Essendon Royals | Victorian State League Division 2 NW | 2020 | – | | 1 | 2 | – | | – | | – | | 1 | 2 |
| Essendon Royals | Victorian State League Division 1 NW | 2021 | 13 | 13 | 2 | 2 | – | | – | | – | | 15 | 15 |
| Essendon Royals | Victorian State League Division 1 NW | 2022 | 21 | 13 | 3 | 2 | – | | – | | – | | 24 | 15 |
| Essendon Royals | NPL Victoria 3 | 2023 | 21 | 5 | 1 | 0 | – | | – | | – | | 22 | 5 |
| Essendon Royals | Victoria Premier League 2 | 2024 | 16 | 6 | 2 | 2 | – | | – | | – | | 18 | 8 |
| Essendon Royals | Victoria Premier League 2 | 2025 | 21 | 8 | 1 | 0 | – | | – | | – | | 22 | 8 |
| Essendon Royals | Total | | 102 | 50 | 10 | 8 | – | | – | | – | | 112 | 58 |
| Keilor Park | Victoria Premier League 2 | 2026 | 0 | 0 | 0 | 0 | – | | – | | 0 | 0 | 0 | 0 |
| Career Total | | | 274 | 65 | 22 | 10 | 11 | 3 | 4 | 0 | 15 | 1 | 324 | 79 |
