= 2016 St Patrick's Athletic F.C. season =

St Patrick's Athletic F.C.
2016 season
- Chairman: Garrett Kelleher
- Coach: Liam Buckley
- Stadium: Richmond Park, Inchicore, Dublin 8
- League of Ireland: 7th
- FAI Cup: Semi-finals (Eliminated by Cork City)
- EA Sports Cup: Champions
- Leinster Senior Cup: Fourth Round (Eliminated by Bray Wanderers)
- Europa League: Second Qualifying Round (Eliminated by Dinamo Minsk)
- Top goalscorer: League: Conan Byrne (11 goals); All: Chris Fagan (17 goals)
- Highest home attendance: 2,400 vs Dinamo Minsk (21 July)
- Lowest home attendance: 369 vs Cork City (17 October)
- Average home league attendance: 1,139
Home colours	Away colours	Third colours

The 2016 season was St. Patrick's Athletic F.C.'s 87th year in existence and was the Supersaint's 65th consecutive season in the top-flight of Irish football. It was the fifth year that Liam Buckley was the team's manager (in his current spell), following replacing Pete Mahon in December 2011. The league season was poor for the Saints, finishing 7th, meaning they would be without European football next season for the first time since 2010. They did however knock Jeunesse Esch out of the Europa League before being narrowly knocked out by Dinamo Minsk of Belarus. They also retained their League Cup crown by winning the 2016 League of Ireland Cup by beating Limerick 4–1 at the Markets Field on 17 September 2016.

== Squad ==
No.	Name	Position(s)	Nationality	Hometown	Date of birth (age)	Previous club	Year signed	Club Apps.	Club Goals
Goalkeepers
1	Brendan Clarke	GK	(Republic of Ireland)	Inchicore, Dublin	17 September 1985 (age 41)	(Republic of Ireland) Sligo Rovers	2012	208	0
16	Conor O'Malley	GK	(Republic of Ireland)	Westport, Mayo	1 August 1994 (age 32)	(Republic of Ireland) Shamrock Rovers B	2015	27	0
25	Pat Jennings	GK	(England)	(England) Watford, Hertfordshire	24 September 1979 (age 47)	(Republic of Ireland) Athlone Town	2013	5	0
Defenders
2	Ger O'Brien (Captain)	RB	(Republic of Ireland)	Inchicore, Dublin	2 June 1984 (age 42)	(Republic of Ireland) Bohemians	2012	187	2
3	Ian Bermingham (Vice-captain)	LB	(Republic of Ireland)	Ballyfermot, Dublin	6 June 1989 (age 37)	(Republic of Ireland) Shamrock Rovers	2010	281	8
4	Darren Dennehy	CB	(Republic of Ireland)	Tralee, Kerry	21 September 1988 (age 38)	(Republic of Ireland) Cork City	2016	32	2
5	Seán Hoare	CB	(Republic of Ireland)	Castleknock, Dublin	5 March 1994 (age 32)	(Republic of Ireland) St Patrick's Athletic Under 19's	2012	98	4
12	Lee Desmond	CB/CDM/LB	(Republic of Ireland)	Donaghmede, Dublin	22 January 1995 (age 31)	(Republic of Ireland) Shelbourne	2015	60	0
13	Rory Feely	CB	(Republic of Ireland)	Athy, Kildare	3 January 1997 (age 29)	(Republic of Ireland) St Patrick's Athletic Under 19's	2014	19	1
15	Shane McEleney	CB/CDM	(Northern Ireland)	Derry, Northern Ireland	26 September 1992 (age 34)	(Republic of Ireland) Derry City	2015	22	0
22	Michael Barker	RB/LB	(Republic of Ireland)	Dublin	16 August 1993 (age 33)	(Republic of Ireland) Bray Wanderers	2016	22	1
23	Jason McGuinness	CB	(Republic of Ireland)	Finglas, Dublin	8 August 1982 (age 44)	(Republic of Ireland) Shamrock Rovers	2015	20	1
26	Ciaran Kelly	LB	(Republic of Ireland)	Lucan, Dublin	4 July 1998 (age 28)	(Republic of Ireland) St Patrick's Athletic Under 19's	2016	1	0
	Conor Kane	LB/LW	(Republic of Ireland)	Palmerstown, Dublin	5 November 1998 (age 28)	(Republic of Ireland) St Patrick's Athletic Under 19's	2016	1	0
Midfielders
6	David Cawley	CM	(Republic of Ireland)	Castlebar, Mayo	17 September 1991 (age 35)	(Republic of Ireland) Sligo Rovers	2016	24	0
7	Conan Byrne	RW	(Republic of Ireland)	Swords, Dublin	10 August 1985 (age 41)	(Republic of Ireland) Shelbourne	2013	175	60
8	Keith Treacy	CM/CDM	(Republic of Ireland)	Sheriff Street, Dublin	13 September 1988 (age 38)	(Republic of Ireland) Drogheda United	2016	21	1
11	Mark Timlin	LW/CAM	(Republic of Ireland)	Buncrana, Donegal	17 November 1994 (age 31)	(Republic of Ireland) Derry City	2016	37	10
14	Graham Kelly	CM/CDM/CAM	(Republic of Ireland)	Whitechurch, Dublin	31 October 1991 (age 35)	(Republic of Ireland) Bray Wanderers	2016	41	5
17	Dylan McGlade	LW	(Republic of Ireland)	Swords, Dublin	22 April 1995 (age 31)	(Republic of Ireland) Shelbourne	2016	8	0
18	Sam Verdon	CM/CAM	(Republic of Ireland)	Kilbarrack, Dublin	3 September 1995 (age 31)	(Republic of Ireland) St Patrick's Athletic Under 19's	2013	44	6
19	Jamie McGrath	LW/CAM/ST	(Republic of Ireland)	Athboy, Meath	30 September 1996 (age 30)	(Republic of Ireland) St Patrick's Athletic Under 19's	2014	66	9
20	Billy Dennehy	LW	(Republic of Ireland)	Tralee, Kerry	17 February 1987 (age 39)	(Republic of Ireland) Cork City	2016	38	9
21	Darragh Markey	CAM	(Republic of Ireland)	Lucan, Dublin	23 May 1997 (age 29)	(Republic of Ireland) St Patrick's Athletic Under 19's	2015	17	0
24	Jack Bayly	CM/CAM	(Republic of Ireland)	Celbridge, Kildare	18 June 1996 (age 30)	(Republic of Ireland) St Patrick's Athletic Under 19's	2013	11	3
27	Steven Kinsella	LW	(Republic of Ireland)	Templeogue, Dublin	22 August 1998 (age 28)	(England) Everton	2016	12	0
28	Jonathan Lunney	CAM/CM	(Republic of Ireland)	Swords, Dublin	2 February 1998 (age 28)	(Republic of Ireland) St Patrick's Athletic Under 19's	2016	4	1
	Steven Grogan	CAM	(Republic of Ireland)	Clondalkin, Dublin	21 July 1997 (age 29)	(Republic of Ireland) St Patrick's Athletic Under 19's	2016	1	0
	Fuad Sule	CDM	(Republic of Ireland)	Tallaght, Dublin	20 January 1997 (age 29)	(Republic of Ireland) St Patrick's Athletic Under 19's	2016	1	0
Forwards
9	Christy Fagan	ST	(Republic of Ireland)	Smithfield, Dublin	11 May 1989 (age 37)	(Republic of Ireland) Bohemians	2012	179	80
10	Daniel Corcoran	ST	(Republic of Ireland)	Donabate, Dublin	13 February 1989 (age 37)	(Republic of Ireland) Sligo Rovers	2016	23	1

=== Transfers ===
==== In ====
Player	Country	Position	Signed from
Graham Kelly	(Republic of Ireland)	Midfielder	(Republic of Ireland) Bray Wanderers
Keith Treacy	(Republic of Ireland)	Midfielder	(Republic of Ireland) Drogheda United
Mark Timlin	(Republic of Ireland)	Midfielder	(Republic of Ireland) Derry City
Michael Barker	(Republic of Ireland)	Defender	(Republic of Ireland) Bray Wanderers
David Cawley	(Republic of Ireland)	Midfielder	(Republic of Ireland) Sligo Rovers
Daniel Corcoran	(Republic of Ireland)	Forward	(Republic of Ireland) Sligo Rovers
Darren Dennehy	(Republic of Ireland)	Defender	(Republic of Ireland) Cork City
Billy Dennehy	(Republic of Ireland)	Midfielder	(Republic of Ireland) Cork City
Dylan McGlade	(Republic of Ireland)	Midfielder	(Republic of Ireland) Shelbourne

==== Out ====
Player	Country	Position	Sold To
Greg Bolger	(Republic of Ireland)	Midfielder	(Republic of Ireland) Cork City
Kenny Browne	(Republic of Ireland)	Defender	(Republic of Ireland) Cork City
Killian Brennan	(Republic of Ireland)	Midfielder	(Republic of Ireland) Shamrock Rovers
Morgan Langley	(United States)	Midfielder	Retired
James Chambers	(Republic of Ireland)	Midfielder	(United States) Bethlehem Steel
Aaron Greene	(Republic of Ireland)	Midfielder	(Republic of Ireland) Limerick
Ian Morris	(Republic of Ireland)	Midfielder	(Northern Ireland) Glenavon
Cyril Guedjé	(Togo)	Forward	Released
Paul Rooney	(Republic of Ireland)	Defender	(Republic of Ireland) Bohemians

==== In ====
Player	Country	Position	Signed from
Steven Kinsella	(Republic of Ireland)	Midfielder	(England) Everton (On loan)

==== Out ====
Player	Country	Position	Sold To
Jason McGuinness	(Republic of Ireland)	Defender	(Northern Ireland) Cliftonville
Shane McEleney	(Northern Ireland)	Defender	Released

=== Squad statistics ===
==== Appearances, goals and cards ====
Number in brackets represents (appearances of which were substituted ON). Last Updated – 29 October 2016

No.	Player	Airtricity League		FAI Cup		EA Sports Cup		Europa League		Leinster Senior Cup		Total	
No.	Player	Apps	Goals	Apps	Goals	Apps	Goals	Apps	Goals	Apps	Goals	Apps	Goals
1	B.Clarke	29	0	4	0	2	0	4	0	0	0	39	0
2	G.O'Brien	27(1)	0	4	0	2	0	4	0	1	0	38(1)	0
3	I.Bermingham	31	3	3	0	3	0	4	0	1	0	42	3
4	D.Dennehy	24(1)	0	2	0	1	1	4	1	1	0	32(1)	2
5	S.Hoare	21(1)	1	4	0	2	0	4	0	0	0	31(1)	1
6	D.Cawley	18(2)	0	0	0	1	0	4(2)	0	1	0	24(4)	0
7	C.Byrne	32(6)	11	3	1	4(2)	1	4	0	1	0	44(8)	13
8	K.Treacy	14(7)	1	1	0	2(1)	0	4	0	0	0	21(8)	1
9	C.Fagan	27(1)	10	3	3	2	2	4	2	1	0	37(1)	17
10	D.Corcoran	15(13)	0	2(1)	1	3(1)	0	2(2)	0	1(1)	0	23(18)	1
11	M.Timlin	26(5)	7	3(1)	2	4(2)	1	4(1)	0	0	0	37(9)	10
12	L.Desmond	17(1)	0	4	0	4	0	0	0	0	0	25(1)	0
13	R.Feely	13(3)	0	1(1)	0	2	1	0	0	1(1)	0	17(5)	1
14	G.Kelly	29(3)	2	4(1)	2	3(1)	1	4(1)	0	1	0	41(6)	5
15	S.McEleney	11(1)	0	0	0	1	0	0	0	1	0	13(1)	0
16	C.O'Malley	3	0	0	0	2	0	0	0	1	0	6	0
17	D.McGlade	5(5)	0	1	0	1	0	0	0	1(1)	0	8(6)	0
18	S.Verdon	18(9)	2	1	0	2	0	2(2)	0	1	0	24(11)	2
19	J.McGrath	23(6)	2	3	1	4(1)	3	1(1)	0	0	0	31(8)	6
20	B.Dennehy	27(4)	4	3	3	3(1)	1	4	0	1	1	38(5)	9
21	D.Markey	7(7)	0	2(2)	0	0	0	0	0	0	0	9(9)	0
22	M.Barker	16(2)	0	3(1)	1	3	0	0	0	0	0	22(3)	1
23	J.McGuinness	1(1)	0	0	0	0	0	0	0	0	0	1(1)	0
24	J.Bayly	0	0	0	0	0	0	0	0	0	0	0	0
25	P.Jennings	1	0	0	0	1(1)	0	0	0	0	0	2(1)	0
26	C.Kelly	1(1)	0	0	0	0	0	0	0	0	0	1(1)	0
27	S.Kinsella	10(5)	0	1(1)	0	1	0	0	0	0	0	12(6)	0
28	J.Lunney	3(1)	1	1(1)	0	0	0	0	0	0	0	4(2)	1
-	C.Kane	0	0	1(1)	0	0	0	0	0	0	0	1(1)	0
-	S.Grogan	0	0	1(1)	0	0	0	0	0	0	0	1(1)	0
-	F.Sule	1(1)	0	0	0	0	0	0	0	0	0	1(1)	0

==== Top scorers ====
Includes all competitive matches. Last updated 29 October 2016

Number	Name	Airtricity League	FAI Cup	EA Sports Cup	Europa League	Leinster Senior Cup	Total
9	Chris Fagan	10	3	2	2	0	17
7	Conan Byrne	11	1	1	0	0	13
11	Mark Timlin	7	2	1	0	0	10
20	Billy Dennehy	4	3	1	0	1	9
19	Jamie McGrath	2	1	3	0	0	6
14	Graham Kelly	2	2	1	0	0	5
3	Ian Bermingham	3	0	0	0	0	3
18	Sam Verdon	2	0	0	0	0	2
4	Darren Dennehy	0	0	1	1	0	2
28	Jonathan Lunney	1	0	0	0	0	1
8	Keith Treacy	1	0	0	0	0	1
10	Dinny Corcoran	0	1	0	0	0	1
22	Michael Barker	0	1	0	0	0	1
5	Seán Hoare	1	0	0	0	0	1
13	Rory Feely	0	0	1	0	0	1

==== Top assists ====
Includes all competitive matches. Last updated 29 October 2016

Number	Name	Airtricity League	FAI Cup	EA Sports Cup	Europa League	Leinster Senior Cup	Total
7	Conan Byrne	10	1	2	0	1	14
20	Billy Dennehy	5	1	2	0	0	8
9	Chris Fagan	6	0	1	0	0	7
3	Ian Bermingham	5	1	0	1	0	7
19	Jamie McGrath	4	0	2	0	0	6
11	Mark Timlin	4	0	2	0	0	6
2	Ger O'Brien	1	2	1	0	0	4
22	Michael Barker	2	1	0	0	0	3
14	Graham Kelly	3	0	0	0	0	3
5	Sean Hoare	0	3	0	0	0	3
12	Lee Desmond	1	0	1	0	0	2
4	Darren Dennehy	1	0	0	1	0	2
18	Sam Verdon	1	1	0	0	0	2
10	Dinny Corcoran	0	2	0	0	0	2
8	Keith Treacy	0	1	0	1	0	2
27	Steven Kinsella	1	0	0	0	0	1
21	Darragh Markey	0	1	0	0	0	1
17	Dylan McGlade	1	0	0	0	0	1

==== Top Clean Sheets ====
Includes all competitive matches. Last updated 29 October 2016

Position	Number	Name	Airtricity League	FAI Cup	EA Sports Cup	Europa League	Leinster Senior Cup	Total
GK	1	Brendan Clarke	9/29	2/4	1/2	1/4	0/0	13/39
GK	16	Conor O'Malley	2/3	0/0	0/2	0/0	0/1	2/6
GK	25	Pat Jennings	0/1	0/0	1/1	0/0	0/0	1/2

==== Disciplinary record ====
Number	Name	Airtricity League		FAI Cup		EA Sports Cup		Europa League		Leinster Senior Cup		Total	
Number	Name	Yellow card	Red card	Yellow card	Red card	Yellow card	Red card	Yellow card	Red card	Yellow card	Red card	Yellow card	Red card
14	Graham Kelly	6	1	0	0	2	0	0	0	0	0	8	1
20	Billy Dennehy	5	0	1	0	1	0	1	0	0	0	8	0
3	Ian Bermingham	5	0	0	0	0	0	2	0	0	0	7	0
9	Chris Fagan	4	0	1	0	1	0	1	0	0	0	7	0
5	Sean Hoare	5	1	1	0	0	0	0	0	0	0	6	1
4	Darren Dennehy	4	1	0	0	1	0	1	0	0	0	6	1
6	David Cawley	5	0	0	0	0	0	0	0	0	0	5	0
8	Keith Treacy	3	0	0	0	0	0	1	0	0	0	4	0
22	Michael Barker	3	0	0	0	0	0	0	0	0	0	3	0
19	Jamie McGrath	2	0	0	0	1	0	0	0	0	0	3	0
11	Mark Timlin	2	0	0	0	0	0	0	0	0	0	2	0
13	Rory Feely	0	1	0	0	0	0	0	0	0	0	0	1
1	Brendan Clarke	0	1	0	0	0	0	0	0	0	0	0	1
7	Conan Byrne	0	0	0	0	1	0	0	0	0	0	1	0
2	Ger O'Brien	0	0	0	0	1	0	0	0	0	0	1	0
15	Shane McEleney	1	0	0	0	0	0	0	0	0	0	1	0
TOTALS		45	5	3	0	8	0	6	0	0	0	62	5

==== Captains ====
No.	P	Name	Country	No. games	Notes
2	DF	Ger O'Brien	(Republic of Ireland)	37	Captain
3	DF	Ian Bermingham	(Republic of Ireland)	8	Vice-captain
7	MF	Conan Byrne	(Republic of Ireland)	1	

Last updated: 29 October 2016
Source: Competitive match reports.
Competitive matches only
Matches started as captain only
Country: FIFA nationality; No.: Squad number; P: Position; Name: Player name; No. Games: Number of games started as captain.

== Club ==
=== Technical Staff ===
- Manager: Liam Buckley
- Assistant manager: Richie Smith
- Head Of Player Recruitment / Coach: Dave Campbell
- Coach: Darius Kierans
- Goalkeeping coach: Pat Jennings
- Strength and Conditioning Coach: Paul Stewart
- Video Analyst: Jason Donohue
- Coaches Assistant: Graeme Buckley
- Chartered Physiotherapist: Fionn Daly
- Physiotherapist: Christy O'Neill
- Club Doctor: Dr Matt Corcoran
- Kit Man: Derek Haines
- Equipment Manager: Gerry Molloy
- Under 19's Management: Gareth Dodrill
- Under 17's Management: Jamie Moore

=== Kit ===
Supplier: Umbro
Sponsor(s): Clune Construction Company L.P. (Front of Jersey), Iceland (Sleeve of jersey)

Home	Home Alt	Away	Away Alt	Third	Third Alt	Third Alt 2

The club released a new Home kit and Third kit for the season, with the Away kit being retained from the 2015 season.

Type	Shirt	Shorts	Socks	Info
Home	Red/White Shoulders	White	Red	Worn 28 times; against Galway United (H) (LOI), Bohemians (H) (LOI), Shamrock Rovers (A) (LOI), Dundalk (H) (LOI), Sligo Rovers (H) (LOI), Finn Harps (A) (LOI), Wexford Youths (H) (LOI), Bray Wanderers (A) (LOI), Cork City (A) (LOI), Bray Wanderers (A) (EAC), Derry City (H) (LOI), Longford Town (H) (LOI), Finn Harps (H) (LOI), Pike Rovers (H) (FAI), Shamrock Rovers (H) (LOI), Jeunesse Esch (H) (UEL), Jeunesse Esch (A) (UEL), Dinamo Minsk (H) (UEL), Shamrock Rovers (H) (EAC), Galway United (H) (LOI), Limerick (H) (FAI), Bohemians (H) (LOI), Shamrock Rovers (A) (LOI), Limerick (A) (EAC), Cork City (H) (FAI), Wexford Youths (H) (LOI), Cork City (H) (LOI), Dundalk (H) (LOI)
Home Alt	Red/White Shoulders	Red	Red	Worn 3 times; against Dinamo Minsk (A) (UEL), Bray Wanderers (H) (LOI), Cobh Ramblers (H) (FAI)
Away	Navy/Navy Red Sleeves	Navy	Navy	Worn 5 times; against Longford Town (A) (LOI), Dundalk (A) (EAC), Dundalk (A) (LOI), Sligo Rovers (A) (LOI), Derry City (A) (LOI)
Away Alt	Navy/Navy Red Sleeves	White	White	Worn 6 times; against Athlone Town (N) (FRN), Cabinteely (N) (FRN), Shelbourne (N) (FRN), Bray Wanderers (A) (LSC), Bluebell United (H) (FRN), Tolka Rovers (H) (FRN)
Third	White	White	White	Worn 4 times; against Galway United (A) (LOI), Bohemians (A) (LOI), Longford Town (A) (LOI), Derry City (H) (LOI)
Third Alt	White	Red	White	Worn 4 times; against Sligo Rovers (H) (LOI), Finn Harps (A) (LOI), Bray Wanderers (A) (LOI), Cork City (A) (LOI)
Third Alt 2	White	Red	Red	Worn 1 time; against Wexford Youths (A) (LOI)

Key:
LOI=League of Ireland
FAI=FAI Cup
EAC= EA Sports Cup
UEL=Europa League
LSC=Leinster Senior Cup
PRC=President's Cup
FRN=Friendly

== Competitions ==
=== League of Ireland ===
==== League table ====
Pos	Team	Pld	W	D	L	GF	GA	GD	Pts
5	Sligo Rovers	33	13	10	10	42	35	+7	49
6	Bray Wanderers	33	13	7	13	39	40	−1	46
7	St Patrick's Athletic	33	13	6	14	45	41	+4	45
8	Bohemians	33	12	5	16	30	37	−7	41
9	Galway United	33	10	8	15	44	54	−10	38

Source: Soccerway
Rules for classification: 1) Points; 2) Goal difference; 3) Goals scored.

==== Results summary ====
Overall								Home						Away					
Pld	W	D	L	GF	GA	GD	Pts	W	D	L	GF	GA	GD	W	D	L	GF	GA	GD
33	13	6	14	45	41	+4	45	7	3	7	30	23	+7	6	3	7	15	18	−3

Last updated: 29 October 2016.

==== Results by round ====
Round	1	2	3	4	5	6	7	8	9	10	11	12	13	14	15	16	17	18	19	20	21	22	23	24	25	26	27	28	29	30	31	32	33
Ground	H	A	H	A	H	A	H	H	A	A	H	A	H	A	H	A	H	A	A	H	H	A	H	A	H	A	H	A	H	H	A	A	H
Result	L	W	W	W	L	W	D	W	L	L	L	W	D	L	L	L	W	L	W	L	W	D	W	W	L	D	W	D	D	W	L	L	L
Position	8	7	6	3	6												6	6	6					6	6	6						6	7

Updated to match(es) played on 29 October 2016. Source: 2016 League of Ireland
A = Away; H = Home; W = Win; D = Draw; L = Loss

==== Matches ====
Win Draw Loss

4 March 2016 Round 1	St Patrick's Athletic	1–3	Galway United	Inchicore, Dublin
19:45 GMT	Chris Fagan 47' (pen.); Billy Dennehy (yellow card) 54'	Report	Stephen Walsh (yellow card) 6'; Vinny Faherty 58'; John Sullivan 83'; Enda Curran (yellow card) 90'; Enda Curran 90+2'	Stadium: Richmond Park; Attendance: 1,626; Referee: Robert Harvey

11 March 2016 Round 2	Longford Town	0–1	St Patrick's Athletic	Mullolagher, County Longford
20:00 GMT	Conor Powell (yellow card) 23'; Conor Powell (yellow card) 45' (red card)	Report	Billy Dennehy (yellow card) 28'; Chris Fagan 65'; Keith Treacy (yellow card) 83'	Stadium: City Calling Stadium; Attendance: 725; Referee: Jim McKell

14 March 2016 Round 3	St Patrick's Athletic	3–0	Bohemians	Inchicore, Dublin
19:45 GMT	Mark Timlin 5'; Chris Fagan 13'; David Cawley (yellow card) 81'; Billy Dennehy 89'; Billy Dennehy (yellow card) 90+3'	Report	Ismahil Akinade (yellow card) 14'; Patrick Kavanagh (yellow card) 34'; Ismahil Akinade (yellow card) 66' (red card); Eoin Wearen (yellow card) 90+1'	Stadium: Richmond Park; Attendance: 1,718; Referee: Padraigh Sutton

18 March 2016 Round 4	Shamrock Rovers	0–2	St Patrick's Athletic	Tallaght, Dublin
20:00 GMT	Gary Shaw (yellow card) 18'; Michael Drennan (yellow card) 40'	Report	Keith Treacy (yellow card) 15'; Billy Dennehy 45'; Chris Fagan 52'	Stadium: Tallaght Stadium; Attendance: 3,453; Referee: Tomas Connolly

24 March 2016 Round 5	St Patrick's Athletic	0–4	Dundalk	Inchicore, Dublin
19:45 GMT	Keith Treacy (yellow card) 22'; Graham Kelly (yellow card) 43'	Report	O'Donnell 9'; McMillan 64'; Horgan 71'; Andy Boyle (yellow card) 75'; Darren Meenan (yellow card) 87'; Brian Gartland 90+1'	Stadium: Richmond Park; Attendance: 2,150; Referee: David McKeon

8 April 2016 Round 7	St Patrick's Athletic	1–1	Sligo Rovers	Inchicore, Dublin
19:45 GMT	Chris Fagan (yellow card) 61'; Chris Fagan 65'; Michael Barker (yellow card) 90+1'	Report	Craig Roddan (yellow card) 18'; Gary Boylan 41'; John Russell (yellow card) 44'; Liam Martin (yellow card) 46'	Stadium: Richmond Park; Attendance: 1,061; Referee: Neil Doyle

11 April 2016 Round 6	Finn Harps	1–2	St Patrick's Athletic	Ballybofey, County Donegal
20:00 GMT	Keith Cowan (yellow card) 70'; David Scully (yellow card) 38'; McHugh 89' (pen.)	Report	Billy Dennehy (yellow card) 43'; Chris Fagan (yellow card) 70'; Patrick Mailey 71' (o.g.); Mark Timlin 78'; Michael Barker (yellow card) 87'	Stadium: Finn Park; Attendance: 801; Referee: Ben Connolly

15 April 2016 Round 8	St Patrick's Athletic	4–0	Wexford Youths	Inchicore, Dublin
19:45 GMT	Mark Timlin 6'; Chris Fagan 10'; Conan Byrne 32'; Conan Byrne 357'	Report	Danny Furlong (red card) 57'	Stadium: Richmond Park; Attendance: Robert Harvey; Referee: 973

23 April 2016 Round 9	Bray Wanderers	1–0	St Patrick's Athletic	Bray, County Wicklow
19:30 GMT	Ger Pender 44'; Ryan Brennan (yellow card) 90'	Report	Brendan Clarke (red card) 90+2'	Stadium: Carlisle Grounds; Attendance: 880; Referee: Graham Kelly

29 April 2016 Round 10	Cork City	1–0	St Patrick's Athletic	Turners Cross, Cork
19:45 GMT	John Dunleavy (yellow card) 17'; Karl Sheppard 26'	Report	Sean Hoare (yellow card) 12'; Conan Byrne (yellow card) 41'; Darren Dennehy (yellow card) 49'; Graham Kelly (yellow card) 88'	Stadium: Turners Cross; Attendance: 2,769; Referee: Derek Tomney

6 May 2016 Round 11	St Patrick's Athletic	0–1	Derry City	Inchicore, Dublin
19:45 GMT	Graham Kelly (yellow card) 65'	Report	Barry McNamee 62'; Aaron McAneff (yellow card) 89'	Stadium: Richmond Park; Attendance: 1,178; Referee: Tomas Connolly

10 May 2016 Round 12	Galway United	0–3	St Patrick's Athletic	Galway
19:45 GMT	John Sullivan (yellow card) 19'; John Sullivan (yellow card) (red card) 40'	Report	Graham Kelly (yellow card) 25'; Shane McEleney (yellow card) 41'; Sean Hoare 44'; Billy Dennehy 51'; Graham Kelly (yellow card) 54' (red card); Jamie McGrath (yellow card) 76'; Conan Byrne 86'	Stadium: Eamonn Deacy Park; Attendance: 856; Referee: Padraigh Sutton

13 May 2016 Round 13	St Patrick's Athletic	3–3	Longford Town	Inchicore, Dublin
20:00 GMT	Darren Dennehy (yellow card) 24'; Sam Verdon 49'; Sean Hoare (yellow card) 50'; Conan Byrne 73'; Darren Dennehy (yellow card) 85' (red card); Jamie McGrath 89'; Ger O'Brien (yellow card) 90+1'	Report	Lee Duffy (yellow card) 14'; Phillip Gannon 46'; Conor Powell 63'; Ian Molloy (yellow card) 85'; David O'Sullivan 87' (pen.); David O'Sullivan (yellow card) 90+2'	Stadium: Richmond Park; Attendance: 932; Referee: Robert Harvey

17 May 2016 Round 17	St Patrick's Athletic	4–0	Finn Harps	Inchicore, Dublin
19:45 GMT	Mark Timlin 9'; Conan Byrne 42'; Billy Dennehy 70'; Mark Timlin 88'	Report	Damien McNulty (yellow card) 68'; Ciaran Coll (yellow card) 85'	Stadium: Richmond Park; Attendance: 750; Referee: Ray Matthews

29 May 2016 Round 14	Bohemians	5–1	St Patrick's Athletic	Phibsborough, Dublin
15:00 GMT	Roberto Lopes 3'; Ismahil Akinade 4'; Jake Kelly 13'; Jake Kelly 31'; James Kavanagh (yellow card) 73'; Kurtis Byrne 82' (pen.)	Report	Bermingham 79'; Hoare (red card) 82'	Stadium: Dalymount Park; Attendance: 1,515; Referee: Graham Kelly

3 June 2016 Round 15	St Patrick's Athletic	0–2	Shamrock Rovers	Inchicore, Dublin
19:45 GMT	David Cawley (yellow card) 36'	Report	Brandon Miele 15'; Sean Heaney (yellow card) 20'; Gary Shaw 77'	Stadium: Richmond Park; Attendance: 2,087; Referee: Tomas Connolly

24 June 2016 Round 16	Dundalk	2–0	St Patrick's Athletic	Dundalk, County Louth
19:45 GMT	Ciarán Kilduff 73'; Ronan Finn 81'	Report	Graham Kelly (yellow card) 15'	Stadium: Oriel Park; Attendance: 2,041; Referee: Derek Tomney

9 July 2016 Round 18	Sligo Rovers	1–0	St Patrick's Athletic	Sligo
19:45 GMT	Raffaele Cretaro 49'	Report	David Cawley (yellow card) 28'; Chris Fagan (yellow card) 58'; Sean Hoare (yellow card) 90+3'	Stadium: The Showgrounds; Attendance: 1,583; Referee: Neil Doyle

1 August 2016 Round 19	Wexford Youths	0–1	St Patrick's Athletic	Crossabeg, County Wexford
22:00 GMT	Aidan Keenan (yellow card) 67'	Report	Ian Bermingham 26'; Ian Bermingham (yellow card) 52'; Billy Dennehy (yellow card) 73'	Stadium: Ferrycarraig Park; Attendance: 507; Referee: Paul McLaughlin

5 August 2016 Round 22	Derry City	1–1	St Patrick's Athletic	Derry, Northern Ireland
19:45 GMT	Rory Patterson 10'; Lukas Schubert (yellow card) 37'	Report	Keith Treacy 23'	Stadium: The Brandywell; Attendance: 1,300; Referee: Paul Tuite

12 August 2016 Round 23	St Patrick's Athletic	1–0	Galway United	Inchicore, Dublin
19:45 GMT	Chris Fagan 3'; Sean Hoare (yellow card) 89'	Report	Kevin Devaney (yellow card) 72'	Stadium: Richmond Park; Attendance: 750; Referee: Ray Matthews

15 August 2016 Round 24	Longford Town	0–1	St Patrick's Athletic	Mullolagher, County Longford
20:00 GMT	Eddie Dsane (yellow card) 43'; Gaius Makouta (yellow card) 55'	Report	Mark Timlin 73'	Stadium: City Calling Stadium; Attendance: 451; Referee: Robert Hennessey

26 August 2016 Round 25	St Patrick's Athletic	0–1	Bohemians	Inchicore, Dublin
19:45 GMT		Report	Kurtis Byrne 57'; Lorcan Fitzgerald (yellow card) 81'	Stadium: Richmond Park; Attendance: 1,486; Referee: Graham Kelly

2 September 2016 Round 26	Shamrock Rovers	0–0	St Patrick's Athletic	Tallaght, Dublin
20:00 GMT	Rob Cornwall (yellow card) 15'; Stephen McPhail (yellow card) 84'; Sean Heaney (yellow card) 90+3'	Report	Darren Dennehy (yellow card) 9'	Stadium: Tallaght Stadium; Attendance: 2,355; Referee: Neil Doyle

6 September 2016 Round 20	St Patrick's Athletic	1–2	Bray Wanderers	Inchicore, Dublin
21:45 GMT	Graham Kelly 43'; Ian Bermingham (yellow card) 83'	Report	John Sullivan (yellow card) 36'; Chris Lyons (yellow card) 85'	Stadium: Richmond Park; Attendance: 667; Referee: Derek Tomney

27 September 2016 Round 29	St Patrick's Athletic	0–0	Sligo Rovers	Inchicore, Dublin
19:45 GMT	Chris Fagan (yellow card) 31'	Report	Jimmy Keohane (yellow card) 88'; Ciaran Nugent (yellow card) 90+2'	Stadium: Richmond Park; Attendance: 507; Referee: Graham Kelly

7 October 2016 Round 30	St Patrick's Athletic	4–1	Wexford Youths	Inchicore, Dublin
19:45 GMT	Conan Byrne 21'; Chris Fagan 32'; Conan Byrne 35' (pen.); Graham Kelly 80'	Report	Lee Chin (yellow card) 63'; Johnny Bonner 84'	Stadium: Richmond Park; Attendance: 650; Referee: Anthony Buttimer

11 October 2016 Round 28	Finn Harps	1–1	St Patrick's Athletic	Ballybofey, County Donegal
20:00 GMT	Sean Houston 90+2'	Report	Mark Timlin (yellow card) 25'; Mark Timlin 64'; Michael Barker (yellow card) 75'	Stadium: Finn Park; Attendance: 728; Referee: Ray Matthews

14 October 2016 Round 31	Bray Wanderers	2–1	St Patrick's Athletic	Bray, County Wicklow
19:30 GMT	Ger Pender 57'; Alan McNally 70'; Ger Pender (yellow card) 74'; Ryan Brennan (yellow card) 87'	Report	Jamie McGrath 12'; Jamie McGrath (yellow card) 28'	Stadium: Carlisle Grounds; Attendance: 897; Referee: David McKeon

17 October Round 21	St Patrick's Athletic	3–1	Cork City	Inchicore, Dublin
	Chris Fagan 16'; Sam Verdon 84'; Ian Bermingham (yellow card) 87'; Conan Byrne 90+4' (pen.)	Report	Alan Bennett 45+1'; Greg Bolger (yellow card) 58'; Alan Bennett (yellow card) 90+1'	Stadium: Richmond Park; Attendance: 369; Referee: Ben Connolly

21 October 2016 Round 32	Cork City	3–1	St Patrick's Athletic	Turners Cross, Cork
19:45 GMT	Mark O'Sullivan 28'; Sean Maguire 48'; Steven Beattie 52'	Report	Conan Byrne 23'	Stadium: Turners Cross; Attendance: 1,180; Referee: Paul Tuite

25 October 2016 Round 27	St Patrick's Athletic	5–2	Dundalk	Inchicore, Dublin
19:45 GMT	Chris Fagan 20'; Conan Byrne 26'; Conan Byrne 36'; Ian Bermingham 40'; Jonathan Lunney 86'	Report	Carlton Ubaezuonu (yellow card) 31'; Dean Shiels 48'; Michael O'Connor 63'	Stadium: Richmond Park; Attendance: 817; Referee: Rob Harvey

28 October 2016 Round 33	St Patrick's Athletic	0–2	Derry City	Inchicore, Dublin
19:45 GMT	Rory Feely (red card) 90+4'	Report	Rory Patterson 26'; Conor McCormack (yellow card) 79'; Rory Patterson 90+5' (pen.)	Stadium: Richmond Park; Attendance: 931; Referee: Rob Rogers

=== FAI Cup ===
Win Draw Loss

21 May 2016 Second Round	St Patrick's Athletic	8–0	Pike Rovers	Inchicore, Dublin
15:00 GMT	Billy Dennehy 2'; Mark Timlin 4'; Billy Dennehy 14'; Michael Barker 35'; Graham Kelly 49'; Mark Timlin 54'; Graham Kelly 60'; Dinny Corcoran 61'	Report		Stadium: Richmond Park; Attendance: 600; Referee: Andrew Mullally

19 August 2016 Third Round	St Patrick's Athletic	2–0	Limerick	Inchicore, Dublin
19:45 GMT	Conan Byrne 42'; Chris Fagan (yellow card) 59'; Chris Fagan 77'	Report	Shane Treacy (yellow card) 65'; Sean Russell (yellow card) 84'	Stadium: Richmond Park; Attendance: 881; Referee: Ben Connolly

10 September 2016 Quarter-final	St Patrick's Athletic	3–2	Cobh Ramblers	Inchicore, Dublin
16:00 GMT	Chris Fagan 15'; Jamie McGrath 21'; Billy Dennehy 32'; Sean Hoare (yellow card) 47'	Report	Charlie Fleming (yellow card) 44'; Connor Ellis 47'; Kevin Mulcahy (yellow card) 59'; Rob Lehane 61'; Shane O'Connor (yellow card) 90+1'; Ben O'Riordan (yellow card) 90+1'	Stadium: Richmond Park; Attendance: 605; Referee: Sean Grant

2 October 2016 Semi-final	St Patrick's Athletic	1–3	Cork City	Inchicore, Dublin
15:55 GMT	Billy Dennehy (yellow card) 36'; Chris Fagan 38'	Report	Alan Bennett 23'; Kenny Browne (yellow card) 33'; Sean Maguire 49'; Sean Maguire 77'	Stadium: Richmond Park; Attendance: 1,866; Referee: Rob Harvey

=== EA Sports Cup ===
Win Draw Loss

18 April 2016 Second Round	Dundalk	0–1 (a.e.t.)	St Patrick's Athletic	Dundalk, County Louth
19:45 GMT		Report	Rory Feely 114'	Stadium: Oriel Park; Attendance: 1,000; Referee: Paul Tuite

2 May 2016 Quarter-final	Bray Wanderers	2–3 (a.e.t.)	St Patrick's Athletic	Bray, County Wicklow
15:00 GMT	Dylan Connolly 59'; Ger Pender (yellow card) 78'; Hugh Douglas (yellow card) 103'; Gareth McDonagh 106'	Report	Billy Dennehy 53'; Ger O'Brien (yellow card) 73'; Jamie McGrath 96'; Mark Timlin 111'; Graham Kelly (yellow card) 113'	Stadium: Carlisle Grounds; Attendance: 700; Referee: Ben Connolly

8 August 2016 Semi-final	Shamrock Rovers	1–3	St Patrick's Athletic	Tallaght, Dublin
21:45 GMT	Dean Clarke 33'; Sean Boyd (yellow card) 69'	Report	Chris Fagan (yellow card) 24'; Darren Dennehy (yellow card) 38'; Darren Dennehy 45+2'; Jamie McGrath (yellow card) 45+4'; Jamie McGrath 57'; Chris Fagan 79'	Stadium: Tallaght Stadium; Attendance: 1,200; Referee: David McKeon

17 September 2016 Final	Limerick	1–4	St Patrick's Athletic	Limerick
19:45 GMT	Lee Lynch 17'; Aaron Greene (yellow card) 53'; Paudie O'Connor (yellow card) 66'	Report	Conan Byrne (yellow card) 58'; Chris Fagan 65'; Billy Dennehy (yellow card) 66'; Conan Byrne 84'; Jamie McGrath 88'; Graham Kelly (yellow card) 89'; Graham Kelly 90+2'	Stadium: Markets Field; Attendance: 4,200; Referee: Rob Rogers

=== Europa League ===
Win Draw Loss

==== First qualifying round ====
28 June 2016 1st leg	St Patrick's Athletic (Republic of Ireland)	1–0	(Luxembourg) Jeunesse Esch	Dublin
20:45 CEST	Christy Fagan 10'; Darren Dennehy (yellow card) 25'	Report	Milos Todorovic (yellow card) 37'; Robin Mertinitz (yellow card) 58'; Emmanuel Lapierre (yellow card) 82'; Andrea Deidda (yellow card) 89'	Stadium: Richmond Park; Attendance: 1,200; Referee: Pavel Orel ( Czech Republic)

5 July 2016 2nd leg	Jeunesse Esch (Luxembourg)	2–1 (2–2 agg.)	(Republic of Ireland) St Patrick's Athletic	Esch-sur-Alzette, Luxembourg
18:45 CEST	Patrick Stumpf 22'; Adrien Portier (yellow card) 41'; Patrick Stumpf 87'; Adrien Portier (yellow card) 90+3' (red card)	Report	Ian Bermingham (yellow card) 27'; Darren Dennehy 73'	Stadium: Stade de la Frontière; Attendance: 1,378; Referee: Irfan Peljto ( Bosnia and Herzegovina)

St Patrick's Athletic won on away goals.

==== Second qualifying round ====
14 July 2016 1st leg	Dinamo Minsk (Belarus)	1–1	(Republic of Ireland) St Patrick's Athletic	Minsk, Belarus
17:30 CEST	Uladzimir Karytska 25'; Uladzimir Khvashchynski (yellow card) 43'; Oleksandr Noyok (yellow card) 48'	Report	Billy Dennehy (yellow card) 16'; Christy Fagan 54'; Ian Bermingham (yellow card) 87'	Stadium: Traktor Stadium; Attendance: 1,286; Referee: Srđan Jovanović ( Serbia)

21 July 2016 2nd leg	St Patrick's Athletic (Republic of Ireland)	0–1 (1–2 agg.)	(Belarus) Dinamo Minsk	Dublin
20:45 CEST	Keith Treacy (yellow card) 67'; Christy Fagan (yellow card) 83'; Darren Dennehy (yellow card) 90+4'	Report	Gleb Rassadkin 18'; Mohamed El Monir (yellow card) 43'; Yury Astravukh (yellow card) 62'; Valery Zhukowski (yellow card) 67'; Aleksandr Sverchinskiy (yellow card) 83'; Uladzimir Khvashchynski (red card) 84'	Stadium: Richmond Park; Attendance: 2,400; Referee: Alan Mario Sant ( Malta)

=== Leinster Senior Cup ===
Win Draw Loss

20 February 2016 Fourth round	Bray Wanderers	3–1	St Patrick's Athletic	Bray, County Wicklow
19:30 GMT	Ryan Brennan 32'; Sean Harding (yellow card) 45'; Ryan Brennan 54'; Dean Kelly 65'	Report	Billy Dennehy 29'	Stadium: Carlisle Grounds; Attendance: 250 (Est.); Referee: Paul Tuite

=== Friendlies ===
Win Draw Loss

==== Preseason ====
5 February 2016	St Patrick's Athletic	2–0	Athlone Town	Baldonnel, County Dublin
19:45 GMT	Conan Byrne 3'; Graham Kelly 75'			Stadium: John Hyland Park; Attendance: 100 (Est.); Referee: Neil Doyle

12 February 2016	Cabinteely	0–1	St Patrick's Athletic	Kilternan, County Dublin
19:30 GMT			Dinny Corcoran 60'	Stadium: Jackson Park; Attendance: 100 (Est.); Referee: Neil Doyle

16 February 2016	St Patrick's Athletic	7–1	Shelbourne	Baldonnel, County Dublin
19:45 GMT	Chris Fagan 5'; Conan Byrne 6'; Conan Byrne 15' (pen.); Ian Bermingham 18'; Chris Fagan 35'; Dinny Corcoran 59'; Chris Fagan 68'	Report	Jamie Doyle 23'	Stadium: John Hyland Park; Attendance: 70 (Est.); Referee: ???

23 February 2016	St Patrick's Athletic	4–2	Bluebell United	Inchicore, Dublin
19:45 GMT	Dinny Corcoran; Conan Byrne; Billy Dennehy; Dylan McGlade		Goal	Stadium: Richmond Park; Attendance: 50 (Est.)

27 February 2016	St Patrick's Athletic	2–0	Tolka Rovers	Inchicore, Dublin
12:00 GMT	Conan Byrne 33'; Conan Byrne 53' (pen.); Graham Kelly (red card) 39'; SeanHoare (red card) 44'		(red card) 54'	Stadium: Richmond Park; Attendance: 60 (Est.)
