= Darren Dennehy =

Irish footballer (born 1988)

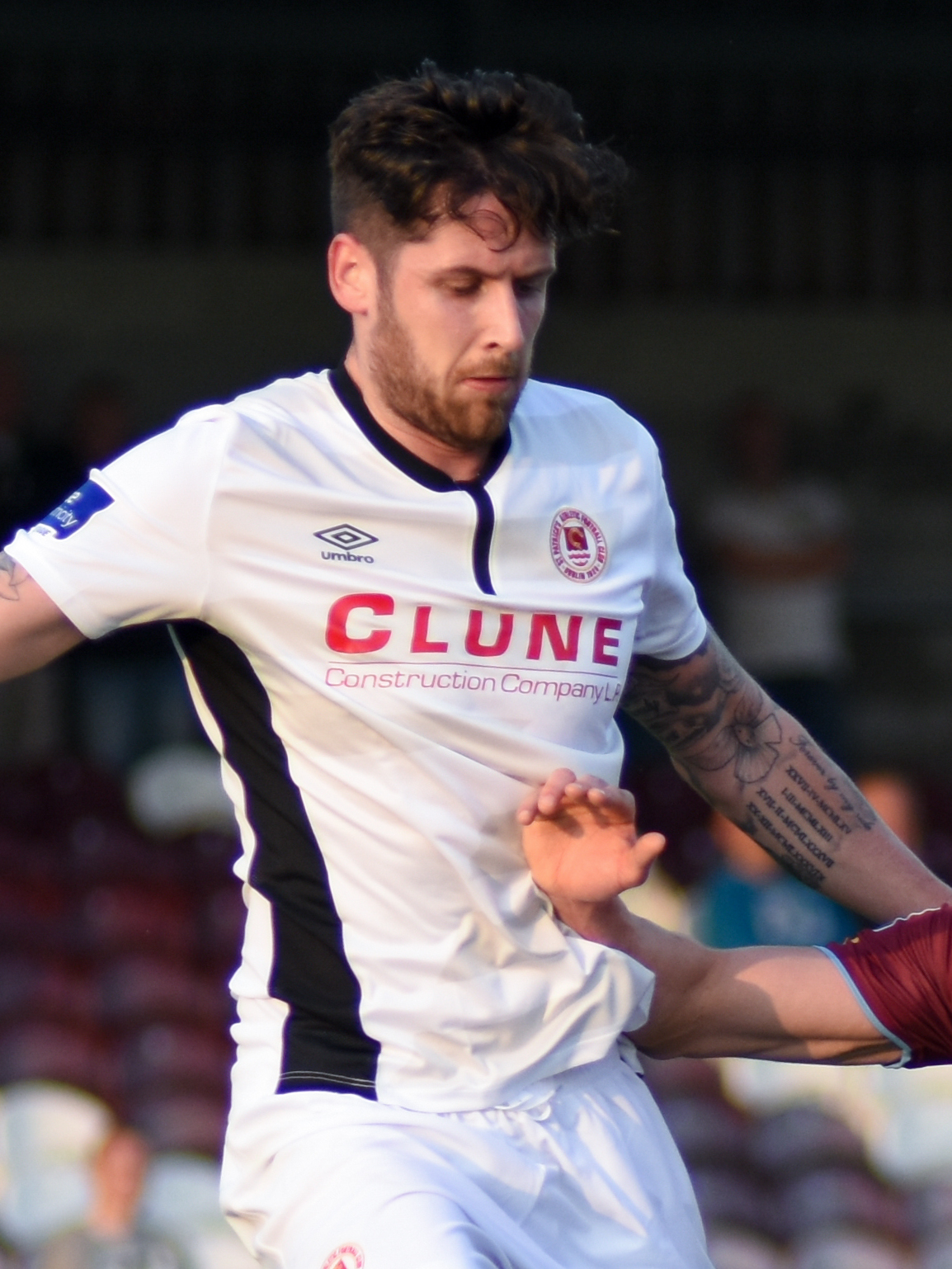
- Dennehy with St Patrick's Athletic in 2016

Personal information
- Date of birth: 21 September 1988 (age 38)
- Place of birth: Tralee, Ireland
- Position: Centre back

Youth career
- 2004–2005: Everton

Senior career*
Years	Team	Apps	(Gls)
2005–2008	Everton	0	(0)
2008–2010	Cardiff City	0	(0)
2009	→ Hereford United (loan)	3	(0)
2009	→ Hereford United (loan)	7	(0)
2010	→ Gillingham (loan)	13	(0)
2010–2012	Barnet	24	(0)
2013–2015	Cork City	64	(7)
2016–2017	St Patrick's Athletic	26	(0)
2018	Limerick	12	(1)

International career
2006–2007	Republic of Ireland U19	7	(2)
2008–2010	Republic of Ireland U21	11	(0)
- * Club domestic league appearances and goals as of 10 #April 2021

Darren Dennehy (born 21 September 1988) is an Irish former footballer who played as a defender for Everton, Cardiff City, Hereford United, Gillingham & Barnet in England, before returning home to play for Cork City, St Patrick's Athletic & Limerick in the League of Ireland Premier Division, alongside his older brother Billy at all three clubs.

== Career ==
=== Everton ===
Born in County Kerry, Dennehy began his career at Everton progressing from the youth system, but did not make a first team appearance at the club. In July 2008, Dennehy was left go by Everton and joined Championship side Cardiff City on a free transfer.

=== Cardiff City ===
After not making a first team appearance at Cardiff during the season, Dennehy spent two weeks training at League One side Hereford United before signing on a one-month loan deal, making his debut the following day in a 1–0 defeat against Southend United. He made just two more appearances for Hereford, in consecutive 3–0 defeats to Scunthorpe United and Swindon Town, before his season was ended when he contracted glandular fever while away with the Republic of Ireland under-21 side.

After returning to Cardiff for the remainder of the 2008–09 season he rejoined Hereford on a six-month loan deal in July 2009, where he made a total of ten appearances in all competitions before returning to Cardiff in late December. On 21 January he joined Football League One side Gillingham on loan. He made his debut for the Gills on 23 January 2010 in a goalless draw with Colchester United and played in all seven matches he was available for during his loan spell before extending his loan deal until late April, returning to Cardiff on 29 April.

=== Barnet ===
On 12 July 2010, Dennehy joined Football League Two side Barnet on a free transfer, making his debut on the opening day of the 2010–11 season in a 2–1 defeat to Chesterfield. Dennehy missed the rest of the 2010–11 season after sustaining a foot injury in the 3–1 home win against Cheltenham Town on 4 September 2010. Dennehy made his comeback in the Football League Trophy victory against Colchester United a year later. In May 2012, Dennehy left Barnet due to the expiry of his contract.

=== Cork City ===
On 12 January 2013 Dennehy signed for League of Ireland club Cork City. His brother Billy Dennehy also signed for City for the 2014 season after being released by Shamrock Rovers. After 2 successive seasons as runners up in the league to Dundalk, as well as 2015 FAI Cup runners up to the same opposition, it was announced that the two Dennehy brothers would not remain at Cork for the 2016 season.

=== St Patrick's Athletic ===
On 9 December 2015, Dennehy signed for Dublin club St Patrick's Athletic, along with older brother Billy.

== Career statistics ==
Correct as of 10 April 2021.

Club	Season	League			National Cup (Note: Includes FA Cup & FAI Cup)		League Cup (Note: Includes EFL Cup & League of Ireland Cup)		Europe		Other		Total	
Club	Season	Division	Apps	Goals	Apps	Goals	Apps	Goals	Apps	Goals	Apps	Goals	Apps	Goals
Everton	Premier League	2005–06	0	0	0	0	0	0	—		—		0	0
Everton	Premier League	2006–07	0	0	0	0	0	0	—		—		0	0
Everton	Premier League	2007–08	0	0	0	0	0	0	—		—		0	0
Cardiff City	EFL Championship	2008–09	0	0	0	0	0	0	—		—		0	0
Hereford United (loan)	EFL League One	2008–09	3	0	0	0	0	0	—		0 (Note: Appearances in EFL Trophy)	0	3	0
Hereford United (loan)	EFL League Two	2009–10	7	0	0	0	2	0	—		1	0	10	0
Hereford United (loan)	Hereford United Total		10	0	0	0	2	0	—		1	0	13	0
Cardiff City	EFL Championship	2009–10	0	0	0	0	0	0	—		—		0	0
Gillingham (loan)	EFL League One	2009–10	13	0	0	0	0	0	—		0	0	13	0
Barnet	EFL League Two	2010–11	5	0	0	0	1	0	—		0	0	6	0
Barnet	EFL League Two	2011–12	19	0	1	0	0	0	—		3	0	23	0
Barnet	Barnet Total		24	0	1	0	1	0	—		3	0	29	0
Cork City	League of Ireland Premier Division	2013	11	0	0	0	1	0	—		3 (Note: 2 appearances in Setanta Sports Cup & 1 appearance in Munster Senior Cup)	0	15	0
Cork City	League of Ireland Premier Division	2014	29	4	3	0	1	0	—		1 (Note: Appearances in Munster Senior Cup)	0	34	4
Cork City	League of Ireland Premier Division	2015	24	3	5	0	0	0	1 (Note: Appearances in UEFA Europa League)	0	2	0	32	3
Cork City	Cork City Total		64	7	8	0	2	0	1	0	6	0	78	7
St Patrick's Athletic	League of Ireland Premier Division	2016	24	0	2	0	1	1	4	1	1 (Note: Appearances in Leinster Senior Cup)	0	32	2
St Patrick's Athletic	League of Ireland Premier Division	2017	2	0	0	0	0	0	—		2	0	4	0
St Patrick's Athletic	St Patrick's Athletic Total		26	0	2	0	1	1	4	1	3	0	36	2
Limerick	League of Ireland Premier Division	2018	12	1	0	0	0	0	—		0	0	12	1
Career total			149	8	11	0	6	1	5	1	13	0	181	17

== Honours ==
=== St Patrick's Athletic ===
- League of Ireland Cup (1): 2016
