= Mark Timlin (footballer) =

Irish footballer (born 1994)

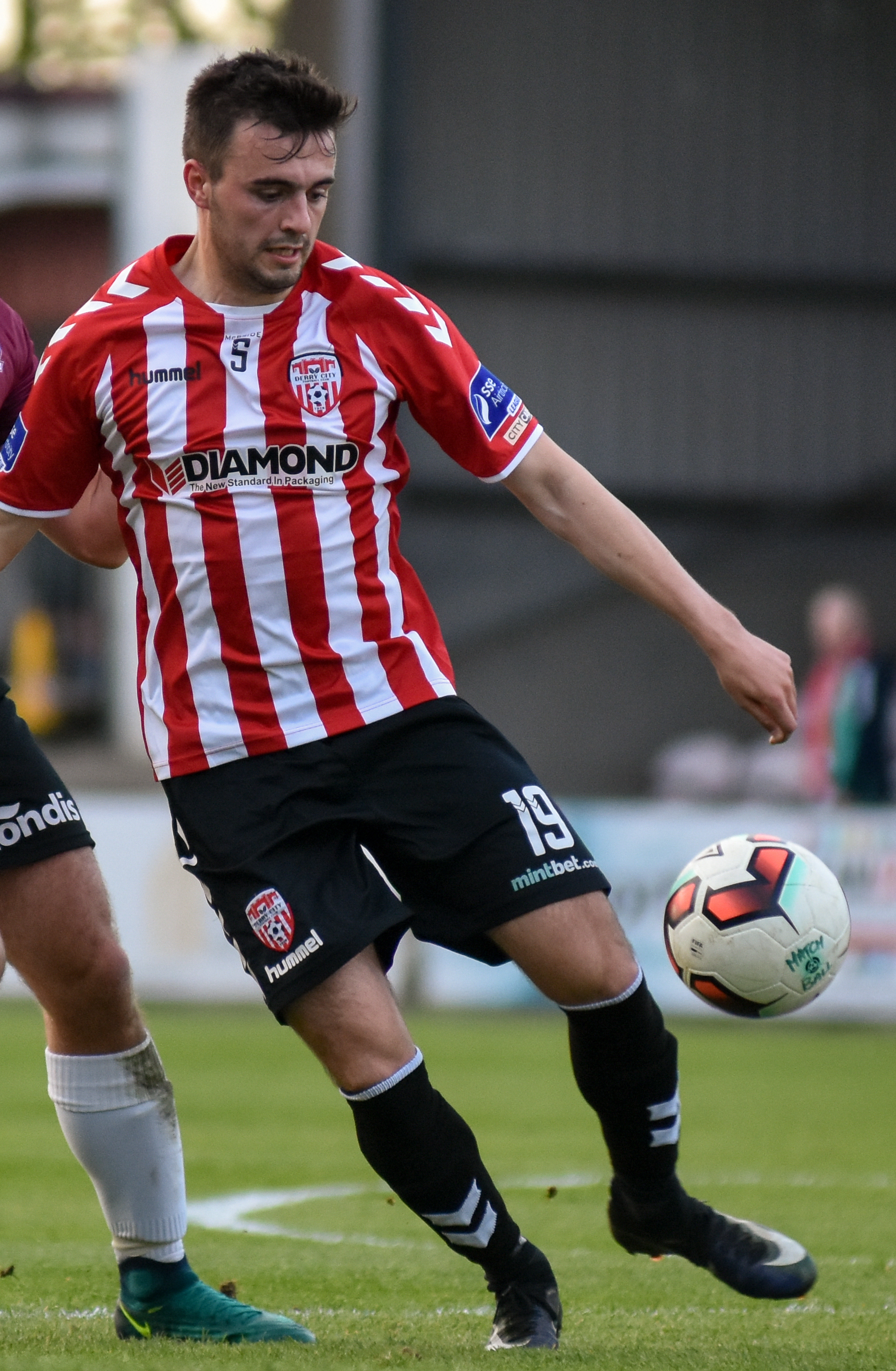
- Timlin with Derry City in 2017

Personal information
- Date of birth: 17 November 1994 (age 31)
- Place of birth: Buncrana, County Donegal, Ireland
- Position: Winger

Youth career
- Buncrana Hearts
- 2011–2014: Ipswich Town

Senior career*
Years	Team	Apps	(Gls)
2014–2015	Derry City	46	(11)
2016	St Patrick's Athletic	26	(7)
2017	Derry City	13	(0)
2017–2022	Finn Harps	73	(4)

International career
2015	Republic of Ireland under-21	1	(0)
- * Club domestic league appearances and goals as of 17 January 2023

Mark Timlin (born 17 November 1994) is an Irish former professional footballer who played for League of Ireland clubs Derry City, St Patrick's Athletic and Finn Harps.

== Career ==
=== Early career ===
Timlin started his career with his local club Buncrana Hearts and at Scoil Mhuire, Buncrana before going on trial with English club Ipswich Town in July 2011, and impressed enough to secure a contract offer from the Tractor Boys.

=== Derry City ===
After 3 seasons with Ipswich reserves scoring 10 goals in 35 games, Timlin's contract came to an end and he made the move back home and went on trial with League of Ireland side Derry City. He impressed Derry boss Roddy Collins enough that he was signed within the week, just prior to the 2014 League of Ireland season. He missed the start of the season through injury but fought his way into the starting eleven following his comeback from injury and kept his place for the majority of the season, even under new manager Peter Hutton as Roddy Collins was sacked not long into the season. He started 18 league games over the season, scoring once, in a 4–2 win over Bohemians. Timlin featured in all four of Derry's Europa League games, scoring in a 4–0 home win over Welsh side Aberystwyth Town in the first qualifying round as his side advanced to face Shakhtyor Soligorsk of Belarus who knocked them out of the competition. He remained an unused substitute in the 2014 FAI Cup Final as Derry lost 2–0 to St Patrick's Athletic.

Timlin became one of City's main men in the 2015 League of Ireland season as they had a poor season, finishing seventh in the league after bad form saw them sack manager Peter Hutton and replace him with his assistant Paul Hegarty, as they were dragged into a relegation battle in the last third of the season. He scored many important goals in their relegation fight and finished the season as Derry's top goalscorer with 10 goals in the league from 28 appearances as well as one goal in the FAI Cup vs Edenderry Town and one in the League Cup against Sligo Rovers. He was also sent off twice against Sligo in the league. After his impressive from for Derry, Timlin attracted many clubs, including rivals St Patrick's Athletic and Shamrock Rovers. New Derry manager Kenny Shiels was also trying his utmost to keep Timlin at the club but was admitted it looked unlikely as he was looking to move onto the next step of his career.

=== St Patrick's Athletic ===
Timlin signed for Dublin club St Patrick's Athletic on 21 November 2015 for the upcoming 2016 season. He made his debut for Pats on the opening day of the 2016 League of Ireland season, soling off the bench as Pats we're shocked by a surprise 3–1 defeat to Galway United. Timlin's first goal for the Saints came in a 3–0 win over Dublin rivals Bohemians when he headed in an Ian Bermingham cross to open the scoring after 5 minutes at Richmond Park. Timlin finished up the season with 10 goals in 37 games in all competitions, earning his first senior medal by winning the 2016 League of Ireland Cup after a 4–1 win over Limerick in the Final. He also appeared in all four of the Saints UEFA Europa League games as they beat Luxembourg side Jeunesse Esch before being knocked out by Dinamo Minsk of Belarus.

=== Return to Derry ===
On 30 November 2016, Timlin returned to Derry City under manager Kenny Shiels on a one-year contract with the option of a second year.

=== Finn Harps ===
Timlin signed for Finn Harps on 28 July 2017 and in no time became Finn Harps solution which led them back to the first division after a 1-year absence and a return to Donegal again. On 17 January 2023, Timlin announced his retirement from football citing persistent injuries as a deciding factor.

== International career ==
Timlin was called up to the Republic of Ireland under-21 squad for a friendly with the Republic of Ireland Amateur squad on 21 February 2015.

== Honours ==
St Patrick's Athletic

- League of Ireland Cup (1): 2016

== Career statistics ==
Professional appearances – correct as of 17 January 2023.

Club	Division	Season	League		Cup		League Cup		Europe		Other		Total	
Club	Division	Season	Apps	Goals	Apps	Goals	Apps	Goals	Apps	Goals	Apps	Goals	Apps	Goals
Derry City	LOI Premier Division	2014	18	1	3	0	1	0	4 (Note: Appearances in UEFA Europa League)	1	–		25	2
Derry City	LOI Premier Division	2015	28	10	3	1	2	1	–		–		33	12
St Patrick's Athletic	LOI Premier Division	2016	26	7	3	2	4	1	4	0	0	0	37	10
Derry City	LOI Premier Division	2017	13	0	–		1	0	0	0	–		14	0
Derry City	Derry City Total		59	11	6	1	4	1	4	1	–		72	14
Finn Harps	LOI Premier Division	2017	10	1	2	0	–		–		–		12	1
Finn Harps	LOI First Division	2018	20	2	2	0	2	0	–		3 (Note: Appearances in League of Ireland Promotion Playoffs)	1	27	3
Finn Harps	LOI Premier Division	2019	14	0	1	0	0	0	–		1 (Note: Appearances in League of Ireland Promotion Playoffs)	0	16	0
Finn Harps	LOI Premier Division	2020	0	0	0	0	–		–		–		0	0
Finn Harps	LOI Premier Division	2021	4	0	0	0	–		–		–		4	0
Finn Harps	LOI Premier Division	2022	25	1	1	0	–		–		–		26	1
Finn Harps	Finn Harps Total		73	4	6	0	2	0	–		4	1	85	5
Career Total			158	22	15	3	10	2	8	1	4	1	194	29
