= Fuad Sule =

Irish-Nigerian footballer

Personal information
- Full name: Fuad Dapo Sule
- Date of birth: 20 January 1997 (age 29)
- Place of birth: Ibadan, Nigeria
- Height: 1.64 m (5 ft 5 in)
- Position: Defensive midfielder

Team information
- Current team: Ballymena United
- Number: 28

Youth career
- 2002–2013: Crumlin United
- 2013–2014: Shamrock Rovers
- 2014–2016: St Patrick's Athletic

Senior career*
Years	Team	Apps	(Gls)
2016	St Patrick's Athletic	1	(0)
2017	Bohemians	24	(0)
2018–2019	Barnet	1	(0)
2018–2019	→ Larne (loan)	19	(0)
2019–2023	Larne	130	(3)
2023–2025	Glentoran	71	(0)
2025–2026	Persis Solo	5	(0)
2026–	Ballymena United	10	(0)
- * Club domestic league appearances and goals as of 29 April 2026

Fuad Dapo Sule (born 20 January 1997) is an Irish professional footballer who plays as a defensive midfielder for NIFL Premiership club Ballymena United.

== Early life ==
Born in Ibadan, Nigeria, Sule moved to the Citywest area of Dublin aged three. He was in the academy at Crumlin United before joining Shamrock Rovers aged 16.

== Career ==
Sule joined St Patrick's Athletic in July 2014. He made his debut for the first team on the final day of the 2016 season against Derry City. This was his only appearance for the Saints before joining Bohemians in December 2016. Sule won the League of Ireland Premier Division player of the month for July 2017. Sule won the Player of the Year award for Bohemians and the League of Ireland Young Player of the Year award for 2017. His transfer to Barnet went through on 1 January 2018 for an undisclosed fee. Sule made his debut as a substitute against Crawley Town on 13 January 2018, but made no further appearances for the Bees for the rest of the season and joined NIFL Championship side Larne on loan on 3 September 2018. Sule joined Larne permanently on a two-and-a-half-year deal on 31 January 2019. He received the club's most man of the match awards in the 2018–19 season and established himself as a firm fans favourite with his all action style. Sule left Larne at the end of the 2022–23 season after turning down a new contract. He made 185 appearances in all competitions before departing.

On 8 July 2023, it was announced that Sule had signed for Larne's Irish League rival, Glentoran.

Sule departed Glentoran on the expiry of his contract in the summer of 2025, and signed for Super League club Persis Solo.

In February 2026 he returned to the Irish Premiership to sign for Ballymena United.

== Style of play ==
Sule played as a striker and attacking midfielder as a schoolboy, before switching to a defensive midfield role at St Patrick's Athletic. His style of play been compared to N'Golo Kanté.

== Personal life ==
Sule's brother Ajibola (born 1992) is also a footballer, having played for Shelbourne and Cabinteely, as well as his cousin Ismahil Akinade who has played in the League of Ireland, as well as Vietnam, Egypt, Bangladesh and Malaysia.

== Career statistics ==
As of 4 January 2026

Appearances and goals by club, season and competition
Club	Season	League			National cup		League cup		Europe		Other		Total	
Club	Season	Division	Apps	Goals	Apps	Goals	Apps	Goals	Apps	Goals	Apps	Goals	Apps	Goals
St Patrick's Athletic	2016	League of Ireland Premier Division	1	0	0	0	0	0	0	0	0	0	1	0
Bohemians	2017	League of Ireland Premier Division	24	0	1	0	2	0	–		0	0	27	0
Barnet	2017–18	EFL League Two	1	0	0	0	0	0	–		0	0	1	0
Barnet	2018–19	National League	0	0	0	0	0	0	–		0	0	0	0
Barnet	Total		1	0	0	0	0	0	–		0	0	1	0
Larne (loan)	2018–19	NIFL Championship	19	0	0	0	0	0	–		3	0	22	0
Larne	2018–19	NIFL Championship	7	1	2	0	0	0	–		0	0	9	1
Larne	2019–20	NIFL Premiership	29	1	2	0	1	0	–		0	0	32	1
Larne	2020–21	NIFL Premiership	30	0	2	0	0	0	–		0	0	32	0
Larne	2021–22	NIFL Premiership	29	0	3	0	0	0	5	0	0	0	37	0
Larne	2022–23	NIFL Premiership	35	1	4	0	1	0	1	0	0	0	41	1
Larne	Total		130	3	13	0	2	0	6	0	0	0	151	2
Glentoran	2023–24	NIFL Premiership	36	0	2	0	1	0	0	0	0	0	39	0
Glentoran	2024–25	NIFL Premiership	35	0	2	0	4	0	0	0	0	0	41	0
Glentoran	Total		71	0	4	0	5	0	0	0	0	0	80	0
Persis Solo	2025–26	Super League	5	0	0	0	0	0	0	0	0	0	5	0
Career total			251	3	16	0	9	0	6	0	3	0	301	3

== Honours ==
Larne

- NIFL Championship: 2018–19
- County Antrim Shield: 2020–21, 2021–22, 2022–23
- NIFL Premiership: 2022–23

Glentoran

- County Antrim Shield: 2024–25

Individual

- NIFL Championship Team of the Year: 2018–19
- League of Ireland Player of the Month: July 2017
