= Jamie McGrath =

Irish footballer (born 1996)

Personal information
- Full name: Jamie Terence McGrath
- Date of birth: 30 September 1996 (age 30)
- Place of birth: Athboy, County Meath, Ireland
- Height: 1.75 m (5 ft 9 in)
- Positions: Attacking midfielder; winger

Team information
- Current team: Hibernian
- Number: 17

Youth career
- Athboy Celtic
- Cherry Orchard
- 2013: UCD
- 2013–2015: St Patrick's Athletic

Senior career*
Years	Team	Apps	(Gls)
2014–2017	St Patrick's Athletic	47	(4)
2017–2019	Dundalk	84	(10)
2020–2022	St Mirren	60	(12)
2022–2023	Wigan Athletic	2	(0)
2022–2023	→ Dundee United (loan)	32	(8)
2023–2025	Aberdeen	59	(13)
2025–	Hibernian	35	(8)

International career^{‡}
2014–2015	Republic of Ireland U19	7	(2)
2016–2018	Republic of Ireland U21	2	(0)
2021–	Republic of Ireland	15	(0)
- * Club domestic league appearances and goals as of 13:52, 21 August 2026 (UTC) ‡ National team caps and goals as of 03:06, 6 June 2026 (UTC)

Jamie Terence McGrath (born 30 September 1996) is an Irish professional footballer who plays as an attacking midfielder or winger for Scottish Premiership club Hibernian, and the Republic of Ireland national team. He started his career with St Patrick's Athletic and has since played for Dundalk, St Mirren, Wigan Athletic, Dundee United and Aberdeen.

== Club career ==
=== Early career ===
A native of Athboy, County Meath, McGrath played youth football for his local club Athboy Celtic before joining top Dublin youth side Cherry Orchard. He played for UCD under 19's before joining St Patrick's Athletic under 19 side on their scholarship scheme with NUI Maynooth. He played for Pats under 19's for two seasons, including a league winning campaign in which McGrath scored two goals against Derry City under 19's in the final. He progressed into the first team in 2014 whilst still playing for the club's under 19 side.

=== St Patrick's Athletic ===
==== 2014 season ====
McGrath made his senior debut with the first team on 9 September 2014 as he played the full 90 minutes in a 2–1 win over Longford Town in the 2014 Leinster Senior Cup Final at City Calling Stadium. McGrath impressed Saints fans with his display, including an excellent through ball to set up Jack Bayly's winning goal in the 64th minute. His League of Ireland debut came on 17 October 2014 when he started against Athlone Town in a 2–0 loss at Richmond Park.

==== 2015 season ====
He was named as a first team player ahead of the 2015 season, with number 19 being assigned to McGrath as his squad number. Mid season when first choice striker Christy Fagan picked up a knee injury, McGrath had an extended run in the starting 11 as a striker and scored his first goals away to Drogheda United and Sligo Rovers in consecutive away games to secure 2–0 and 3–0 wins respectively. McGrath made his first appearances in UEFA competition when he came on from the bench both away and at home against Latvian side Skonto Riga in the Europa League. McGrath came on at the start of extra time in the 2015 League of Ireland Cup Final as Pats drew 0–0 with Galway United before winning 4–3 on penalties to win the League Cup at Eamonn Deacy Park. McGrath received rave reviews from fans, pundits and the media alike for his breakthrough season, coming in a second behind Lee Desmond in the club's Young Player of the Year awards.

==== 2016 season ====
Although he struggled with shin splints that kept him out of games at the beginning of the 2016 season, his importance to the team increased in a season where the team struggled to deal with the midfield losses of Chris Forrester, Greg Bolger, Killian Brennan and James Chambers. Those losses however, created an opportunity for McGrath to play a lot of games in the role of attacking midfielder throughout the season. His first goal of the season was an 89th-minute strike to rescue a point at home to relegation fighting Longford Town live on Eir Sport. His only appearance in Europe for the season came against Dinamo Minsk of Belarus as Pats lost 1–0 at home and were knocked out of the Europa League in the second qualifying round. McGrath played a huge part in the Saints retaining their League Cup trophy as he played in every game, scoring away from home against Bray Wanderers in the quarter-finals, Shamrock Rovers in the semi's and Limerick in the Final. Following a good season for McGrath, he was voted St Patrick's Athletic Young Player of the Season by the club's supporters.

=== Dundalk ===
McGrath moved from St Patrick's Athletic to Dundalk for an undisclosed transfer fee on 15 January 2017.

=== St Mirren ===
After winning back-to-back League of Ireland Premier Division titles with Dundalk, McGrath signed a 2 1/2-year deal with Scottish Premiership side St Mirren on 7 January 2020. He was named as the club's Player of the Year for the 2020–21 season by the club's supporters after scoring and impressive 17 goals in 45 appearances in all competitions from midfield.

=== Wigan Athletic ===
On 31 January 2022, transfer deadline day, McGrath signed for EFL League One club Wigan Athletic on a two-and-a-half-year contract. After making four appearances for the club, he spent the 2022–23 season on loan at Dundee United, before on 26 July 2023, making the decision to terminate his contract due to repeated contractual breaches by the previous owners of Wigan, despite the club's efforts to retain him.

==== Dundee United loan ====
On 3 August 2022, he joined Dundee United on loan until the end of the 2022–23 season. He made his debut the following day, providing the assist for Glenn Middleton's goal in a 1–0 win over AZ Alkmaar in the UEFA Europa Conference League. McGrath made 32 appearances in all competitions over the course of the season, scoring 7 goals, but this was not enough to help his side avoid relegation to the Scottish Championship as they finished bottom of the table.

=== Aberdeen ===
After leaving Wigan, McGrath returned to the Scottish Premiership by signing a two-year contract with Aberdeen on 22 August 2023. He made his debut two days later, coming off the bench in the 70th minute away to BK Häcken in the UEFA Europa League, helping his side to comeback from two goals down to earn a 2–2 draw. On 30 September 2023, McGrath scored in a 3–1 win over Rangers at Ibrox Stadium on his 27th birthday. On 9 November 2023, he scored his first career European goal when he found the bottom corner with a 30-yard free kick away to PAOK to level the scores at 2–2 in his sides UEFA Europa Conference League draw at the Toumba Stadium. In January 2025, he sustained a shoulder injury that required surgery, with the intensive rehabilitation period keeping him out of action for several months. McGrath signed a pre-contract agreement with Hibernian in February 2025.

=== Hibernian ===
McGrath joined Hibernian in June 2025, having agreed a four-year contract with the club earlier that year. On 24 July 2025, he scored within seven minutes of his debut against Danish side FC Midtjylland in the first leg of the second round of the 2025–26 UEFA Europa League qualifying. McGrath scored 9 goals in 41 appearances in all competitions in an impressive debut season with Hibs that saw him voted the club's Men's Player of the Year and Player's Player of the Year awards.

== International career ==
McGrath's first taste of under-19's international football came when he was called up to the Republic of Ireland under-19s by Paul Doolin for their November 2014 games against Malta and Gibraltar. His first appearance came against Malta in a 1–0 win in Waterford. He went on to make a total of six appearances for the 19's, scoring twice vs Azerbaijan at Tallaght Stadium. McGrath was called up to the Republic of Ireland under-21 squad for the first time by manager Noel King on 8 November 2016, for their games against Czech Republic and Slovakia in La Manga Club, Spain.

On 24 May 2021, McGrath received his first call up to the Republic of Ireland senior squad by his former Dundalk manager Stephen Kenny for the summer friendlies against Andorra and Hungary, making his full international debut in the away fixture in Andorra on 3 June 2021. His first senior start for Ireland came in a 2–1 loss in a 2022 World Cup qualifier against Portugal on 1 September 2021 at the Estádio Algarve in Faro, in which he provided the assist for John Egan's opening goal.

After 18 months out of the squad, McGrath was recalled in May 2026 for end-of-season friendlies against Qatar and Canada.

== Career statistics ==
=== Club ===
As of match played on 20 August 2026

Appearances and goals by club, season and competition
Club	Season	League			National cup (Note: Includes FAI Cup, Scottish Cup, FA Cup)		League cup (Note: Includes League of Ireland Cup, Scottish League Cup, EFL Cup)		Europe		Other		Total	
Club	Season	Division	Apps	Goals	Apps	Goals	Apps	Goals	Apps	Goals	Apps	Goals	Apps	Goals
St Patrick's Athletic	2014	LOI Premier Division	1	0	0	0	0	0	0	0	1 (Note: Appearance(s) in Leinster Senior Cup)	0	2	0
St Patrick's Athletic	2015	LOI Premier Division	23	2	2	0	4	0	2 (Note: Appearances in UEFA Europa League)	0	2	1	33	3
St Patrick's Athletic	2016	LOI Premier Division	23	2	3	1	4	3	1	0	0	0	31	6
St Patrick's Athletic	Total		47	4	5	1	8	3	3	0	3	1	66	9
Dundalk	2017	LOI Premier Division	28	6	3	0	4	1	1 (Note: Appearance in UEFA Champions League)	0	2 (Note: One appearance in President of Ireland's Cup, one appearance in Leinster Senior Cup)	0	38	7
Dundalk	2018	LOI Premier Division	30	2	2	1	3	1	4	0	1 (Note: Appearance in President of Ireland's Cup)	0	40	4
Dundalk	2019	LOI Premier Division	26	2	4	0	2	0	6 (Note: Four appearances in UEFA Champions League; two appearances in UEFA Europa League)	0	2 (Note: Appearance in Champions Cup)	1	40	3
Dundalk	Total		84	10	9	1	9	2	11	0	5	1	118	14
St Mirren	2019–20	Scottish Premiership	7	0	4	0	—		—		—		11	0
St Mirren	2020–21	Scottish Premiership	35	10	3	3	7	4	—		—		45	17
St Mirren	2021–22	Scottish Premiership	18	2	0	0	4	1	—		—		22	3
St Mirren	Total		60	12	7	3	11	5	—		—		78	20
Wigan Athletic	2021–22	League One	2	0	1	0	—		—		1 (Note: Appearance in EFL Trophy)	0	4	0
Wigan Athletic	2022–23	Championship	0	0	0	0	0	0	—		—		0	0
Wigan Athletic	Total		2	0	1	0	0	0	—		1	0	4	0
Dundee United (loan)	2022–23	Scottish Premiership	32	8	1	1	2	0	2 (Note: Appearances in UEFA Europa Conference League)	0	—		37	9
Aberdeen	2023–24	Scottish Premiership	34	9	3	1	3	0	8 (Note: Two appearances in UEFA Europa League; six appearances and one goal in UEFA Europa Conference League)	1	—		48	11
Aberdeen	2024–25	Scottish Premiership	25	4	1	0	7	1	—		—		33	5
Aberdeen	Total		59	13	4	1	10	1	8	1	—		81	16
Hibernian	2025–26	Scottish Premiership	34	8	1	0	1	0	5 (Note: Two appearances and one goal in UEFA Europa League; Three appearances in UEFA Conference League)	1	—		41	9
Hibernian	2026–27	Scottish Premiership	1	0	0	0	1	0	2 (Note: Appearances in UEFA Conference League)	0	—		4	0
Hibernian	Total		35	8	1	0	2	0	7	1	—		45	9
Career total			319	55	28	7	42	11	31	2	9	2	429	77

=== International ===
As of match played 5 June 2026

Appearances and goals by national team and year
National team	Year	Apps	Goals
Republic of Ireland	2021	6	0
Republic of Ireland	2022	1	0
Republic of Ireland	2023	5	0
Republic of Ireland	2024	1	0
Republic of Ireland	2025	0	0
Republic of Ireland	2026	2	0
Total		15	0

== Honours ==
St Patrick's Athletic

- FAI Cup: 2014
- League of Ireland Cup: 2015, 2016
- Leinster Senior Cup: 2014

Dundalk

- League of Ireland Premier Division: 2018, 2019
- FAI Cup: 2018
- League of Ireland Cup: 2017, 2019
- President of Ireland's Cup: 2019
- Champions Cup: 2019

Wigan Athletic

- EFL League One: 2021–22

Aberdeen

- Scottish Cup: 2024–25

Individual

- St Patrick's Athletic Young Player of the Season: 2016
- PFAI Young Player of the Year: 2018
- St Mirren Player of the Year: 2020–21
- Hibernian Men's Player of the Year: 2025–26
- Hibernian Player's Player of the Year: 2025–26
