= Chris Fagan (Irish footballer) =

Irish footballer (born 1989)

Personal information
- Full name: Christopher Joseph Fagan
- Date of birth: 11 May 1989 (age 37)
- Place of birth: Dublin, Ireland
- Position: Forward

Youth career
- St. Anthony's Boys
- Home Farm
- 2005–2008: Manchester United

Senior career*
Years	Team	Apps	(Gls)
2009	Hamilton Academical	0	(0)
2009–2010	Lincoln City	13	(3)
2010	→ Jerez Industrial (loan)	12	(4)
2011	Bohemians	23	(11)
2012–2018	St Patrick's Athletic	175	(64)

International career
2008	Republic of Ireland U19		
2009–2010	Republic of Ireland U21	2	(0)
- * Club domestic league appearances and goals as of 01:58, 22 February 2021 (UTC)

Christopher Joseph Fagan (born 11 May 1989) is an Irish retired footballer who played as a forward. He last played for St Patrick's Athletic in the League of Ireland Premier Division.

== Club career ==
Born in Dublin, County Dublin, Fagan began his career as a youth player with St. Anthony's Boys and Home Farm in his native Dublin before signing schoolboy forms with Manchester United in 2005 at the age of 15. He was a regular for the club's youth team, scoring 16 goals in 52 appearances over his first two seasons in England, including helping the team reach the final of the 2006–07 FA Youth Cup, in which he scored in the semi-final second leg against Arsenal as United overturned a 1–0 deficit from the first leg, before scoring in the penalty shoot-out in the final, only for United to lose 4–3. He made two substitute appearances for the reserves in 2005–06, scoring on his second outing against Middlesbrough after coming on for John O'Shea. He made a further nine reserve appearances in 2006–07, including his first start in a 2–0 Manchester Senior Cup win over Oldham Athletic, followed by his first reserve team goal in a 1–0 league win over Everton three days later; however, he struggled to break into the reserves on a regular basis in 2007–08, scoring three goals in just seven appearances, and he was released at the end of the season.

After his release, Fagan began training at the Glenn Hoddle Academy in Spain, leading to a trial period with Huddersfield Town in March 2009, in which he scored a hat-trick on his debut for the club's reserves, before Hamilton Academical signed him at the end of that month.

After failing to secure a permanent contract with Hamilton, Fagan signed for Lincoln City in June 2009. He made his Lincoln debut on 8 August 2009 in a League Two match against Barnet at Sincil Bank, which Lincoln won 1–0. He scored his first goal for the club on 18 August in the League Two match against Bradford City at Valley Parade, which Lincoln won 2–0. He scored four times in 17 appearances for Lincoln, but was deemed surplus to requirements at the club after the appointment of Chris Sutton as manager in September 2009, and on 1 February 2010, he moved on loan to Spanish third-tier side Jerez Industrial, with which the Glenn Hoddle Academy had strong links, for the remainder of the 2009–10 season. He scored two goals on his debut for Industrial, helping them come back from 2–0 down to beat Sangonera 3–2 at home. He returned to Lincoln City in May 2010, but was placed on the transfer list by Sutton, and on 31 August 2010, Fagan was released by Lincoln City.

In October 2010, Fagan went on trial with Conference National side Gateshead, scoring for the reserves on 26 October in a 5–1 defeat against Middlesbrough Reserves.

=== Bohemians ===
In February 2011, Pat Fenlon brought Fagan to Bohemians just in time for the new season. Fagan signed following an earlier, unsuccessful, trial with Shamrock Rovers where he had played in two pre-season friendlies. He scored his first goal for the club on his League debut for Bohs against Bray Wanderers on 4 March 2011 from the penalty spot in the Carlisle Grounds. Despite an injury hit campaign, he managed to score 11 league goals in 23 appearances and also netted for Bohs in their UEFA Europa League tie against Olimpija Ljubljana.

==== 2012 season ====
Fagan signed for St Patrick's Athletic for the 2012 season, replacing Danny North as Pats' number 9. Fagan started off well at his new club, receiving the man of the match award at home to Cliftonville, for his superb link up play in the Setanta Sports Cup First Round Second Leg at Richmond Park. Although he was suspended for the first three games of the season, Fagan was eligible to play in the Leinster Senior Cup, and he played the full game against Phoenix and scored his first goal for Pats after three minutes. He made his league début away to his old club Bohemians as a second-half substitute. Fagan's first league start for the Saints also marked his first league goal when he scored a 43rd-minute equaliser in the Dublin derby against rivals Shelbourne at Tolka Park. Fagan continued his excellent form when he was one of the main players in Pats' 5–1 demolition of rivals Shamrock Rovers, he set up Christopher Forrester's second goal and scored his side's fourth and fifth goals when he rounded Rovers goalkeeper Oscar Jansson to finish and the fifth was a header into the empty net after a good ball by Jake Kelly. His backheeled assist for Chris Forrester's famous scooped goal made it on to the 'Showboat' section of the hugely popular Soccer AM. Fagan continued his excellent form with the opening goal in a 2–0 win over U.C.D. More success followed for Fagan when he scored a brace against Bray Wanderers at the Carlisle Grounds although unfortunately the Saints had two points taken from them by a 94th-minute Jason Byrne equaliser in a 3–3 draw. He scored his seventh league goal of the season when he opened the scoring away to Monaghan United in a 4–0 thrashing. Goals 9 and 10 of the season came against his old club Bohemians when he tapped in an 82nd-minute equaliser and a 94th-minute header in a 2–1 win. Fagan scored a vital goal in a 1–0 win over Íþróttabandalag Vestmannaeyja (ÍBV) from Iceland, when he volleyed in a Ger O'Brien cross. He scored a vital away goal against NK Široki Brijeg at Stadion Pecara in Bosnia and Herzegovina in a 1–1 draw. He also scored the winner in a 2–1 win in the 105th minute in the second leg, making it four goals in his last four games in the Europa League and earning Pats a tie with Hannover 96 from Germany. He received the League of Ireland Player of the Month award for July for his wonderful European exploits. Fagan continued to excel with Pats and he scored the winner in a 1–0 win away to Cork City at Turners Cross to make it to the 10 goal mark in the league. Fagan was in excellent for towards the end of the 2012 season, scoring away to Shelbourne in a 2–0 win, away to eventual champions Sligo Rovers in a thrilling 3–2 loss and at home to Cork City on the final day of the league season in a 1–0 win to secure qualification to the 2013–14 Europa League. On 6 November 2012, Fagan made it 2–2 with an 87th-minute equaliser in the 2012 FAI Cup final at the Aviva Stadium against Derry City but unfortunately for him and everyone connected with the club, Pats lost 3–2 after extra time to extend their cup-hoodoo to 52 years and 7 FAI Cup Final losses since a cup triumph.

==== 2013 season ====
Fagan started off the 2013 season playing well but lacking goals and as a result of this, he lost his place in the team to Anto Flood. Fagan won himself a penalty in the 85th minute away to Cork City, but his kick was easily saved by Mark McNulty in goal. On 6 May 2013, Fagan made his 50th appearance for the Saints in all competitions, when he came on from the bench away to Drogheda United in the 76th minute and after just five minutes he scored a tap in from a Ger O'Brien cross, ending a 14-game goal drought and putting the Saints 1–0 up. Drogheda equalised in the 90th minute but straight from tip-off, Fagan appeared to handle the ball himself in the Drogheda box but won a penalty that Killian Brennan scored to win the game 2–1 for Pats. This regained his place in the starting 11 in the Dublin derby against Shamrock Rovers, but he failed to score as Pats drew 0–0. Anto Flood however picked up an illness so Fagan retained his place in the team for another Dublin derby, away to Shelbourne. Fagan didn't disappoint and scored twice as Pats cruised to a 3–0 win. Flood returned from illness for the trip to both striker's former club Bohemians, but Fagan beat him to the starting spot and opened the scoring after 24 minutes to make it four goals in four games for him, as Pats won 2–0 to go top of the league. Fagan scored a brace at home to UCD in the FAI Cup Second Round on 1 June 2013. He continued his good form as he scored away to Dundalk in a rare 2–1 loss for Pats on 14 June as well as scoring two goals against Bray Wanderers on 28 June as the Saints won 2–0 at Richmond Park. However, he would have to wait until 19 August for his next goal, his two goals away to Shelbourne were enough to see St Pat's through to the 2013 Leinster Senior Cup Final. Fagan's final goal of the season came on 26 September 2013 when he scored in the 95th minute to secure a 3–1 win against Bray Wanderers at the Carlisle Grounds in a vital game in the League of Ireland title run-in. On 13 October 2013 at a packed Richmond Park, Pats beat Sligo Rovers 2–0 to seal the 2013 League of Ireland title, the club's ninth league title and Fagan's first trophy in senior football.

==== 2014 season ====
Fagan started the 2014 season brilliantly, winning another trophy in the form of the inaugural 2014 FAI President's Cup, as the Saints beat Sligo Rovers 1–0 at Richmond Park on 2 March 2014. He got off the mark early with his goalscoring as he opened the scoring on the opening day of the 2014 League of Ireland season away to Cork City to earn a 1–1 draw for his side. He followed this up by scoring a 92nd-minute winner a week later in a 3–2 win at home to UCD in the second league game of the season. Fagan brought his goalscoring tally up to three goals in three games on 22 March, when he opened the scoring against Limerick at Richmond Park.

In July 2014, he scored the opening goal in St. Patrick's' 1–1 draw away to Legia Warsaw in the first leg of their 2014–15 UEFA Champions League second qualifying round tie.

== International career ==
Fagan played at international football for the Republic of Ireland at under-19 and under-21 levels. He played for the under-19s in qualifying for the 2008 UEFA European Under-19 Championship, in a 2–0 loss to Belarus on 1 November 2007, and a 3–0 win over Andorra two days later.

He received his first call-up to the under-21 side in January 2009, while he was training at the Glenn Hoddle Academy, for a match against Germany the following month; however, he was an unused substitute in the match. He made his debut the next month, coming on for Alan Judge in the 76th minute of a 2–1 win over Spain, followed by another substitute appearance in a 3–0 loss to Turkey in a qualifier for the 2009 UEFA European Under-21 Championship.

== Career statistics ==
As of 14 June 2018

Appearances and goals by club, season and competition
Club	Season	League			National Cup		League Cup		Europe		Other		Total	
Club	Season	Division	Apps	Goals	Apps	Goals	Apps	Goals	Apps	Goals	Apps	Goals	Apps	Goals
Lincoln City	2009–10	Football League Two	13	3	2 (Note: Appearances in FA Cup)	1	1 (Note: Appearances in EFL Cup)	0	—		1 (Note: Appearances in Football League Trophy)	0	17	4
Jerez Industrial (loan)	2009–10	Segunda División B	12	4	0 (Note: Appearances in Copa del Rey)	0	—		—		0 (Note: Appearances in Copa Federación de España)	0	12	4
Bohemians	2011	League of Ireland Premier Division	23	11	3 (Note: Appearances in FAI Cup)	0	0 (Note: Appearances in League of Ireland Cup)	0	2 (Note: Appearances in UEFA Europa League)	1	3 (Note: 1 appearance in Setanta Sports Cup, 2 appearances and 1 goal in Leinster Senior Cup)	1	31	13
St Patrick's Athletic	2012	League of Ireland Premier Division	25	12	3	1	0	0	5	3	3 (Note: 2 appearances in Setanta Sports Cup, 1 appearance and 1 goal in Leinster Senior Cup)	1	36	17
St Patrick's Athletic	2013	League of Ireland Premier Division	32	8	3	2	1	0	2	0	3 (Note: 1 appearance in Setanta Sports Cup, 2 appearances and 2 goals in Leinster Senior Cup)	2	41	12
St Patrick's Athletic	2014	League of Ireland Premier Division	32	20	5	6	0	0	2 (Note: Appearances in UEFA Champions League)	1	3 (Note: 1 appearance in Setanta Sports Cup, 1 appearance in Leinser Senior Cup and 1 appearance in President of Ireland's Cup)	0	42	27
St Patrick's Athletic	2015	League of Ireland Premier Division	16	6	1	0	1	0	2	0	3 (Note: 2 appearances and 1 goal in Leinster Senior Cup, 1 appearance in President of Ireland's Cup)	1	23	7
St Patrick's Athletic	2016	League of Ireland Premier Division	27	10	3	3	2	2	4	2	1 (Note: Appearances in Leinster Senior Cup)	0	37	17
St Patrick's Athletic	2017	League of Ireland Premier Division	28	7	2	1	1	0	—		2	2	30	10
St Patrick's Athletic	2018	League of Ireland Premier Division	15	1	0	0	1	1	—		1	1	17	3
St Patrick's Athletic	St Patrick's Athletic Total		175	64	17	13	6	3	15	6	16	7	229	93
Career total			223	82	22	14	7	3	17	7	20	8	289	114

== Honours ==
=== Club ===
St Patrick's Athletic

- League of Ireland Premier Division (1): 2013
- FAI Cup (1): 2014
- League of Ireland Cup (2): 2015, 2016
- President of Ireland's Cup (1): 2014
- Leinster Senior Cup (1): 2014

=== Individual ===
- PFAI Player of the Year (1): 2014
- League of Ireland Golden Boot (1): 2014
- PFAI Team of the Year (1): 2014
- League of Ireland Player of the Month (3): July 2012, November 2014, March 2016
- St Patrick's Athletic Player of the Year (1): 2014
- St Patrick's Athletic Goal of the Season (1): 2016 (vs Dinamo Minsk)
- St Patrick's Athletic top goalscorer in UEFA competition: 6 goals
