= Billy Dennehy =

Irish footballer (born 1987)

Personal information
- Full name: William Michael Dennehy
- Date of birth: 17 February 1987 (age 39)
- Place of birth: Tralee, Ireland
- Position: Winger

Youth career
- Tralee Dynamos
- Kingdom Boys
- Shelbourne

Senior career*
Years	Team	Apps	(Gls)
2005–2008	Sunderland	0	(0)
2007–2008	→ Accrington Stanley (loan)	7	(0)
2008	Derry City	4	(0)
2009	Cork City	29	(7)
2010–2013	Shamrock Rovers	124	(19)
2014–2015	Cork City	55	(23)
2016–2017	St Patrick's Athletic	50	(6)
2018	Limerick	30	(4)

International career
- Republic of Ireland U17
- Republic of Ireland U19
2007	Republic of Ireland U21	1	(0)
2010	Republic of Ireland U23	2	(0)

Managerial career
- 2022–2023: Kerry
- * Club domestic league appearances and goals as of 09:38, 17 November 2023 (UTC)

William Michael Dennehy (born 17 February 1987) is an Irish former footballer and is the Sporting Director of League of Ireland First Division side Kerry. He was a left-sided midfielder but also played on the right wing. He is the older brother of Darren whois an Irish former footballer.

== Playing career ==
Dennehy was a talented underage player in both soccer and Gaelic football. In the latter sport, he won the 2004 Munster Minor Football Championship with the Kerry minor team and also played with the Austin Stacks club in Tralee. He attended Irish language primary and secondary schools and is fluent in the Irish language.

Dennehy began his soccer playing career at local club Tralee Dynamos until the club disbanded and he joined Kingdom Boys. There, Dennehy was called into the Shelbourne team. After trials with Nottingham Forest, Aston Villa and Southampton, Dennehy was brought to Sunderland by Mick McCarthy after the midfielder impressed during a trial at the Stadium of Light. He signed for the Black Cats in January 2005.

Dennehy did not make a first-team appearance for Sunderland, but was a reserve and youth player at the club, and was given the squad number 34 for the 2006–07 season.

On 22 November 2007, Dennehy made the move from Wearside to Lancashire, joining Accrington Stanley on a one-month deal. There, he made his first ever league appearance on 5 December against Rochdale. After a further 6 appearances in June 2008, Dennehy was released by Sunderland.

On 27 August 2008, Dennehy signed for League of Ireland side Derry City. After just a few months, however, he opted to uproot and join Cork City, signing a two-year contract with the club on 27 January 2009.

On 25 January 2010, Dennehy moved from Cork City to Shamrock Rovers. He scored on his debut in a preseason friendly at Longford Town. He scored his first league goal for the Hoops on 9 April.

In 2010 and 2011 he won the League of Ireland championship with Shamrock Rovers. He also won the Setanta Cup in 2011 and played in the Europa League group stages netting against PAOK in November 2011:

In 2011, he was club top scorer (in all competitions) with 16 goals.

On 13 November 2013 Dennehy was released by Shamrock Rovers and 13 days later he rejoined Cork City and would be part of John Caulfield's squad for the 2014 season alongside his brother Darren Dennehy. After 2 successive seasons as runners up in the league to Dundalk, as well as 2015 FAI Cup runners up to the same opposition, it was announced that Dennehy would not remain at Cork for the 2016 season.

On 9 December 2015, Dennehy signed for Dublin club St Patrick's Athletic, along with younger brother Darren. Dennehy scored on his debut for Pats on 20 February 2016 in a 3–1 loss away to Bray Wanderers in the Leinster Senior Cup.

== International career ==
Dennehy has played at U17, U18, U19, U21 and U23 levels for the Republic of Ireland national football team making his U21 debut in February 2007. He made his U23 debut in May 2010. Has part of the winning team in the Under-19 International La Manga Tournament in Spain in 2006.

== Management ==
In December 2022, he was named as the manager of newly founded League of Ireland First Division team Kerry F.C. On 17 November 2023, it was announced that Dennehy had stepped down as manager to return to his original position of Sporting Director of the club.

== Career statistics ==
Professional appearances

Appearances and goals by club, season and competition
Club	Season	League			Cup		League Cup		Europe		Other		Total	
Club	Season	Division	Apps	Goals	Apps	Goals	Apps	Goals	Apps	Goals	Apps	Goals	Apps	Goals
Sunderland	2005–06	Premier League	0	0	0	0	0	0	0	0	—		0	0
Sunderland	2006–07	EFL Championship	0	0	0	0	0	0	0	0	—		0	0
Accrington Stanley (Loan)	2007–08	EFL League Two	7	0	0	0	0	0	0	0	0	0	7	0
Derry City	2008	League of Ireland Premier Division	4	0	0	0	0	0	0	0	0	0	4	0
Cork City	2009	League of Ireland Premier Division	29	7	0	0	1	0	0	0	0	0	30	7
Shamrock Rovers	2010	League of Ireland Premier Division	34	6	4	0	1	0	4	0	1	0	44	6
Shamrock Rovers	2011	League of Ireland Premier Division	35	9	2	3	0	0	12	1	3	2	52	15
Shamrock Rovers	2012	League of Ireland Premier Division	29	4	1	0	1	1	2	0	4	1	37	6
Shamrock Rovers	2013	League of Ireland Premier Division	26	0	2	0	2	1	—		5	5	35	6
Shamrock Rovers	Shamrock Rovers Total		124	19	9	3	4	2	18	1	13	8	198	33
Cork City	2014	League of Ireland Premier Division	30	13	3	3	1	0	—		0	0	34	16
Cork City	2015	League of Ireland Premier Division	25	10	6	2	1	0	1	0	1	0	34	12
Cork City	Cork City Total		84	30	9	5	3	0	1	0	1	0	98	35
St Patrick's Athletic	2016	League of Ireland Premier Division	27	4	3	3	3	1	4	0	1	1	38	9
St Patrick's Athletic	2017	League of Ireland Premier Division	23	2	2	0	1	1	—		1	0	27	3
St Patrick's Athletic	St Patrick's Athletic Total		50	6	5	3	4	2	4	0	2	1	65	12
Limerick	2018	League of Ireland Premier Division	30	4	2	0	1	0	—		0	0	33	4
Career Total			300	59	25	11	12	4	23	1	16	9	409	84

== Honours ==
=== Club ===
Shamrock Rovers

- League of Ireland (2): 2010, 2011
- League of Ireland Cup (1): 2013
- Setanta Sports Cup (2): 2011, 2013
- Leinster Senior Cup (2): 2012, 2013

St Patrick's Athletic

- League of Ireland Cup (1): 2016

=== Individual ===
- Shamrock Rovers Young Player of the Year (1): 2010

=== Gaelic Football ===
Kerry GAA

- Munster Minor Football Championship (1): 2004
