= 2016 League of Ireland Cup =

EA Sports Cup

Tournament details
- Country: Ireland
- Dates: 21 March – 17 September
- Teams: 24

Final positions
- Champions: St Patrick's Athletic
- Runners-up: Limerick

Tournament statistics
- Matches played: 23
- Top goal scorer(s): John O'Flynn, Limerick

The 2016 League of Ireland Cup, known for sponsorship reasons as the 2016 EA Sports Cup, was the 43rd season of the League of Ireland's secondary knockout competition. The EA Sports Cup features teams from the SSE Airtricity League Premier and First Divisions, as well as some intermediate level teams.

== Teams ==
Pool 1	Pool 2	Pool 3	Pool 4
Cobh Ramblers; Cork City *; Limerick; Rockmount; Waterford United; Wexford Youths *	Cockhill Celtic; Derry City *; Finn Harps; Galway United; Mayo League; Sligo Rovers *	Bluebell United; Bray Wanderers; Drogheda United; Dundalk *; St Patrick's Athletic *; UCD	Athlone Town *; Bohemians; Cabinteely; Longford Town; Shamrock Rovers *; Shelbourne

Clubs denoted with * received a bye into Second Round

== First round ==
The draw for the First Round took place on 17 February 2016. The First Round games were played on 21, 22 and 28 March 2016.

21 March 2016	Galway United	3–1	Mayo League	Eamonn Deacy Park
19:45	Pauric Cunningham 3', 14', 16'		JP O'Gorman 61'

21 March 2016	Shelbourne	5–0	Cabinteely	Tolka Park
	Gavin Boyne 8'; Sodiq Oguntula 61', 66'; James English 75'; Mark Sandford 88'

21 March 2016	Drogheda United	0–0* (PN) (a.e.t.) (3-4 p)	Bluebell United	Hunky Dorys Park
19:45

22 March 2016	Finn Harps	1–0	Cockhill Celtic	Finn Park
20:00	Ethan Boyle 24'

22 March 2016	Cobh Ramblers	2–4	Limerick	St. Colman's Park
19:15	Markus Gustavsson 75', 78'		Robbie Williams 15'; Stephen Kenny 17'; John O'Flynn 47', 52'

22 March 2016	UCD	0–2	Bray Wanderers	UCD Bowl
19:45			Mark Salmon 45+1'; Andrew Lewis 54'

22 March 2016	Bohemians	3–1	Longford Town	Dalymount Park
19:45	Peter McGlynn 3' (o.g.); Derek Prendergast 48'; Jake Kelly 53'		David O'Sullivan 3'

28 March 2016	Waterford United	4–0	Rockmount	Waterford Regional Sports Centre
14:00	Eoin Rhodes 7', 28'; James Dermody 33'; Dean Broaders 59'

== Second round ==
The draw for the Second Round took place on 23 March 2016. The games were played on 18 and 19 April 2016.

18 April 2016	Cork City	7–0	Waterford United	Turners Cross
19:45	Danny Morrissey 46'; Ian Turner 50'; Gavan Holohan 54'; Gearoid Morrissey 57'; Mark O'Sullivan 60'; Conor McCarthy 70'; Mark O'Sullivan 72'

18 April 2016	Galway United	0–0 (a.e.t.) (4–2 p)	Finn Harps	Eamon Deacy Park
19:45

18 April 2016	Dundalk	0–1 (a.e.t.)	St Patrick's Athletic	Oriel Park
19:45			Rory Feely 113'

18 April 2016	Shelbourne	0–0 (a.e.t.) (4–3 p)	Bohemians	Tolka Park
19:45

19 April 2016	Limerick	4–0	Wexford Youths	Market's Field
19:15	Aaron Greene 32'; John O'Flynn 38', 71'; Aaron Greene 90'

19 April 2016	Derry City	2–0	Sligo Rovers	The Brandywell
19:45	Nathan Boyle 34', 45'

19 April 2016	Bray Wanderers	4–2 (a.e.t.)	Bluebell United	Carlisle Grounds
19:45	Ryan Brennan 27' (pen.); Ger Pender 34'; Andrew Lewis 101'; Dylan Connolly 115' (pen.)		Sean Byrne 40', 69'

19 April 2016	Shamrock Rovers	3–0	Athlone Town	Tallaght Stadium
19:45	Sean Heaney 24'; Sean Boyd 45'; Trevor Clarke 79'

== Quarter finals ==
2 May 2016	Bray Wanderers	2–3 (a.e.t.)	St Patrick's Athletic	Carlisle Grounds
15:00	Dylan Connolly 59'; Gareth McDonagh 106'		Billy Dennehy 53'; Jamie McGrath 96'; Mark Timlin 111'	Attendance: 700; Referee: Ben Connolly

2 May 2016	Shelbourne	1–1 (a.e.t.) (2–3 p)	Shamrock Rovers	Tolka Park
19:00	Danny North (o.g.)		Dean Clarke 62'	Attendance: 779; Referee: Ray Matthews

2 May 2016	Cork City	1–2 (a.e.t.)	Derry City	Turners Cross
19:45	Mark O'Sullivan 9'		Barry McNamee 38'; Dean Jarvis 95'	Attendance: 901; Referee: Sean Grant

3 May 2016	Limerick	2–0	Galway United	Markets Field
19:15	Paudie O'Connor 27'; Shane Duggan 52'			Attendance: 1,243; Referee: Anthony Buttimer

== Semi finals ==
1 August 2016	Derry City	0–1	Limerick	The Brandywell
19:45		Report	Stephen Kenny 15'	Referee: Robert Harvey

8 August 2016	Shamrock Rovers	1–3	St Patrick's Athletic	Tallaght Stadium
21:45	Dean Clarke 33'	Report	Billy Dennehy 45+2'; Jamie McGrath 57'; Christy Fagan 80'	Referee: D. McKeon

== Final ==
17 September 2016	Limerick	1–4	St Patrick's Athletic	Markets Field
17:30	Lee Lynch 17'	Report	Christy Fagan 65'; Conan Byrne 84'; Jamie McGrath 87'; Graham Kelly 90+1'	Attendance: 4,362; Referee: Robert Rogers (Dublin)

== Top scorers ==
Rank	Player	Club	Goals
1	(Republic of Ireland) John O'Flynn	Limerick	4
2	(Republic of Ireland) Padraic Cunningham	Galway United	3
2	(Republic of Ireland) Mark O'Sullivan	Cork City	3
2	(Republic of Ireland) Jamie McGrath	St Patrick's Athletic	3
3	(Sweden) Markus Gustavsson	Cobh Ramblers	2
3	(Republic of Ireland) Sean Byrne	Waterford United	2
3	(Republic of Ireland) Aaron Greene	Limerick	2
3	(Northern Ireland) Nathan Boyle	Derry City	2
3	(Republic of Ireland) Stephen Kenny	Limerick	2
3	(Nigeria) Sodiq Oguntola	Shelbourne FC	2
