= Conan Byrne =

Irish footballer (born 1985)

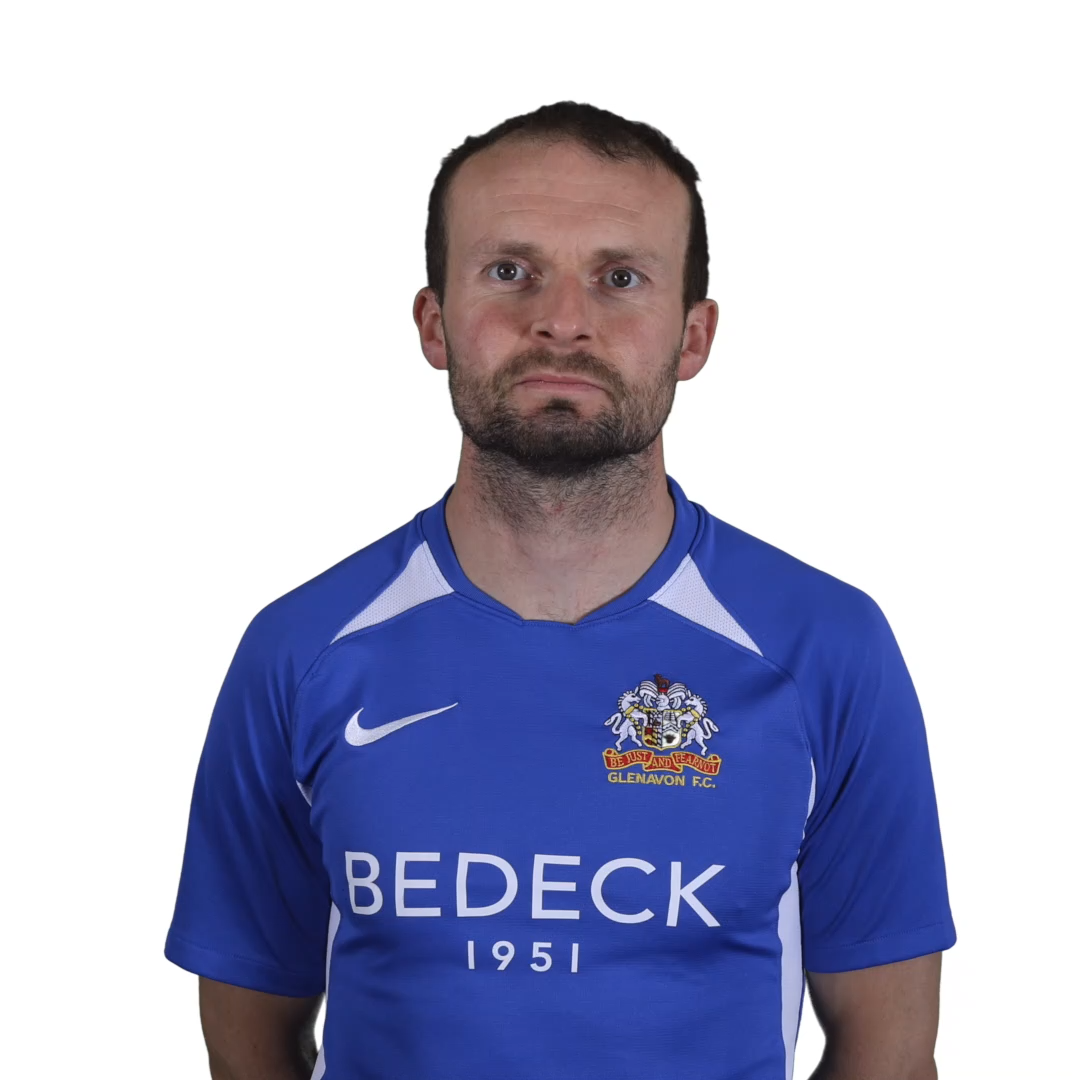
- Byrne with Glenavon

Personal information
- Full name: Conan Stephen Byrne
- Date of birth: 10 July 1985 (age 41)
- Place of birth: Dublin, Ireland
- Position: Winger

Youth career
- Swords Rovers
- Home Farm
- River Valley Rangers

Senior career*
Years	Team	Apps	(Gls)
2005–2007	UCD	50	(3)
2008–2011	Sporting Fingal	105	(36)
2011–2012	Shelbourne	51	(15)
2013–2018	St Patrick's Athletic	193	(61)
2019	Shelbourne	17	(2)
2020–2021	Glenavon	19	(2)
Total		438	(119)
- * Club domestic league appearances and goals

Conan Stephen Byrne (born 10 July 1985) is an Irish retired footballer. He began his career with UCD, with whom he played three seasons. He later spent six seasons with St Patrick's Athletic, three seasons with Sporting Fingal, three seasons with Shelbourne, before ending his career with NIFL Premiership club Glenavon.

== Career ==
=== UCD ===
From Swords, County Dublin, Byrne began his schoolboy days with local sides Swords Rovers and River Valley Rangers before joining UCD in 2005. With immediate effect Byrne scored prolifically for UCD's Under-21 side and eventually made his way into the UCD starting line-up as a forward. He made his League of Ireland debut in the Carlisle Grounds on 16 September 2005. In spite of scoring UCD's equaliser in his second game their 2005 League Cup final defeat to Derry City he could not replicate his underage scoring level for the senior team and drifted out of the team. He was remodelled as a right winger during the 2007 season and re-established himself in that berth since Patrick Kavanagh's departure to Birmingham City. In this role he was named UCD's Player of the Season in 2007.

=== Sporting Fingal ===
In January 2008 Byrne departed UCD to sign for newly formed League of Ireland First Division side Sporting Fingal where he also took up the position as Marketing Manager for the club. He finished his first season with 9 goals from midfield having played every game for the club and was voted the Supporters Player of the Season for the second year in succession.

In the 2009 season Byrne finished top scorer in the First Division with 21 goals and Sporting Fingal's top scorer with an outstanding 28 goals from 45 league and cup appearances. Byrne capped off a successful 2009 season securing promotion to the Premier Division with Sporting Fingal via the play-offs and securing an FAI Cup winners medal after Sporting's 2–1 victory over Sligo Rovers in the final. He had another successful season in 2010 as Sporting Fingal finished 4th in their first season in the Premier Division and participated in Fingal's UEFA Europa League ties against Portuguese Primeira Liga side C.S. Marítimo.

Prior to the start of the 2011 season doubts began to surface over the financial viability of Sporting Fingal due to the withdrawal of backer Gerry Gannon. Following the collapse of a critical sponsorship deal, Sporting Fingal announced on 10 February 2011 that the club would cease to exist leaving Byrne and 12 other contracted players without a club. He played in every game bar one Leinster Senior Cup tie during Sporting Fingal's short history.

=== Shelbourne ===
On 20 February 2011, Byrne as a free-agent signed for First Division side Shelbourne.

=== St Patrick's Athletic ===
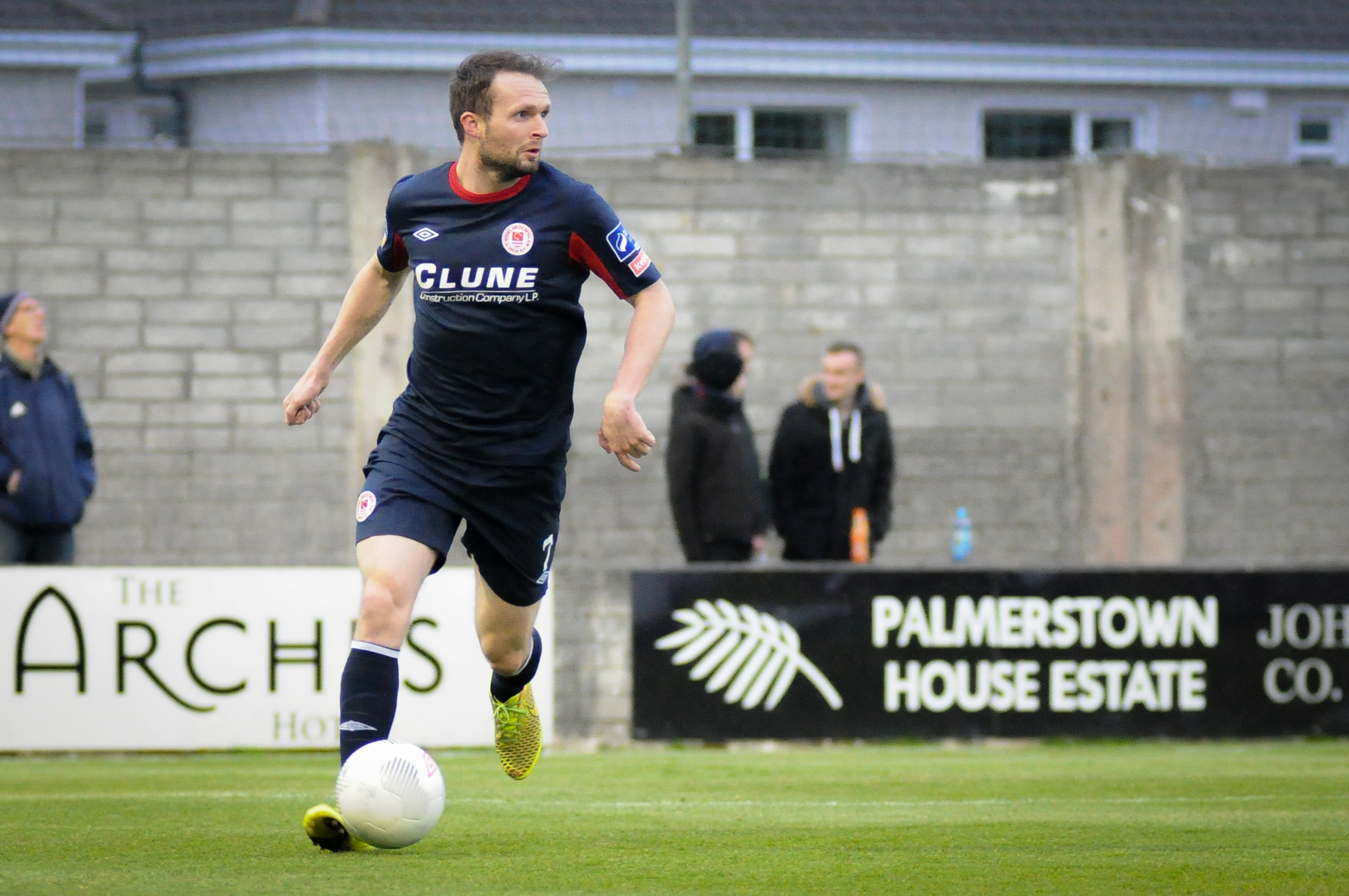
Byrne in action for St Patrick's Athletic away to Galway United in 2015.

Byrne's performances for Shelbourne drew interest from top clubs including St Patrick's Athletic, whom he signed for in November 2012 and officially announced by the club on 20 November. Byrne scored an incredible 40 yard free kick against Athlone Town in a 7–2 win, during a pre-season friendly. He continued his pre-season form into the start of the season in competitive games, setting up Kenny Browne to score a header against Bangor Celtic in the Leinster Senior Cup and Shane McFaul's winner against Drogheda United on the opening day of the 2013 League of Ireland season in front of Republic of Ireland manager Giovanni Trapattoni. Byrne scored his first competitive goal for the Saints on 2 April 2013 when he scored 14 minutes after coming off the bench in a 2–1 loss to Dundalk at Richmond Park. Byrne scored against his former team Shelbourne in a 4–0 win for Pats at Richmond Park on 15 April 2013. He scored again four days later live on RTÉ when Pats beat champions Sligo Rovers 2–0 to end their 100% record in the league.

In 2017, Byrne scored his 100th league goal of his career from inside his own half as St. Patrick's defeated Bohemians 4–0.

=== Return to Shelbourne ===
Byrne rejoined Shelbourne for the 2019 League of Ireland First Division season, helping the club secure promotion to the Premier Division as champions.

=== Glenavon ===
On the expiry of his Shelbourne contract, Byrne signed an 18-month deal with NIFL Premiership club Glenavon, taking effect from January 2020. He made his debut as a substitute in a 2–2 draw against Institute. His first goal for the club came in a 3–0 away win against Ballymena United. On 29 April 2021 Byrne announced his intention to retire at the end of the season.

== Personal life ==
Byrne set up the Conan Byrne Zambian Aid Mission in Mongu, Zambia, making trips in 2009 and 2012.

== Career statistics ==
Correct as of 2 June 2021.

Club	Season	League			National Cup		League Cup		Europe		Other		Total	
Club	Season	Division	Apps	Goals	Apps	Goals	Apps	Goals	Apps	Goals	Apps	Goals	Apps	Goals
UCD	2005	LOI Premier Division	8	0	1	0	1	1	—		—		10	1
UCD	2006	LOI Premier Division	11	0	2	0	1	0	—		—		14	0
UCD	2007	LOI Premier Division	31	3	4	2	3	0	—		—		38	5
UCD	UCD Total		50	3	7	2	5	1	—		—		62	6
Sporting Fingal	2008	LOI First Division	36	8	4	0	1	1	—		—		41	9
Sporting Fingal	2009	LOI First Division	33	21	6	3	3	3	—		3 (Note: Appearances in League of Ireland promotion/relegation playoffs)	1	45	28
Sporting Fingal	2010	LOI Premier Division	36	7	5	3	1	0	2 (Note: Appearances in UEFA Europa League)	0	2 (Note: Appearances in Leinster Senior Cup)	0	46	10
Sporting Fingal	Sporting Fingal Total		105	36	15	6	5	4	2	0	5	1	132	47
Shelbourne	2011	LOI First Division	28	13	3	2	1	0	—		3	3	35	18
Shelbourne	2012	LOI Premier Division	23	2	3	1	1	0	—		3	3	29	6
St Patrick's Athletic	2013	LOI Premier Division	33	9	3	1	1	1	2	1	5 (Note: 3 appearances & 1 goal in Leinster Senior Cup, 2 appearances in Setanta Sports Cup)	1	44	13
St Patrick's Athletic	2014	LOI Premier Division	33	18	6	4	1	0	2 (Note: Appearances in UEFA Champions League)	0	6 (Note: 3 appearances & 2 goals in Setanta Sports Cup, 2 appearances & 1 goal in Leinster Senior Cup, 1 appearance in President of Ireland's Cup)	3	48	25
St Patrick's Athletic	2015	LOI Premier Division	29	7	2	1	3	0	1	0	4 (Note: 3 appearances & 1 goal in Leinster Senior Cup, 1 appearance in President of Ireland's Cup)	1	39	9
St Patrick's Athletic	2016	LOI Premier Division	32	11	3	1	4	1	4	0	1	0	44	13
St Patrick's Athletic	2017	LOI Premier Division	33	9	2	0	2	0	—		2	0	39	9
St Patrick's Athletic	2018	LOI Premier Division	33	7	2	1	0	0	—		2	0	37	8
St Patrick's Athletic	St Patrick's Athletic Total		193	61	18	8	11	2	9	1	19	4	251	77
Shelbourne	2019	LOI First Division	17	2	1	0	0	0	—		0	0	18	2
Shelbourne	Shelbourne Total		68	17	7	3	1	0	—		6	6	82	26
Glenavon	2019–20	NIFL Premiership	6	1	0	0	–		—		1 (Note: Appearances in Mid-Ulster Cup)	0	7	1
Glenavon	2020–21	NIFL Premiership	16	1	0	0	–		—		3	0	19	1
Glenavon	Glenavon Total		22	2	0	0	0	0	—		4	0	26	2
Career total			438	119	47	19	20	7	11	1	34	16	554	158

== Honours ==
=== Club ===
Sporting Fingal

- FAI Cup (1): 2009

St Patrick's Athletic

- League of Ireland Premier Division (1): 2013
- FAI Cup (1): 2014
- League of Ireland Cup (2): 2015, 2016
- President of Ireland's Cup (1): 2014
- Leinster Senior Cup (1): 2014

Shelbourne

- League of Ireland First Division (1): 2019

Glenavon

- Mid-Ulster Cup (1): 2020–21

=== Personal ===
- St Patrick's Athletic Player of the Season: 2017
- St Patrick's Athletic Goal of the Season: 2017 (vs. Bohemians)
