= Connacht Senior League (association football) =

Football league in Ireland

- Country: (Republic of Ireland) Ireland
- Region: Connacht
- Level on pyramid: 3
- Domestic cup(s): Connacht Senior Cup; League of Ireland Cup; FAI Cup; FAI Intermediate Cup
- League cup(s): Connacht League Cup/Shield; Connacht Senior League Challenge Cup; Connacht Senior League Incentive Cup
- Most championships: Mervue United (8 titles)

The Connacht Senior League (CSL) was an association football league featuring amateur, intermediate, and League of Ireland reserve teams affiliated to the Connacht Football Association. It was a third level league in the Irish football league system. An earlier provincial league, the Western League, had been active, on and off, since the 1930s before the Connacht Football Association decided to establish a more permanent league. The CSL was active between 1981 and 2000. In 2013 discussions were held about relaunching the league.

== History ==
=== Western League ===
The Connacht Football Association first established a provincial league in the 1930s. The Western League had a stop start history and was active up until the early 1970s. Counties Galway, Sligo, Mayo and Roscommon organized their own qualifying rounds, using either a knock-out or round-robin format. The most successful team from this era was Galway Bohemians who were Western League champions on six occasions. Other participants in the Western League included Galway Rovers, Castlebar Celtic and Westport United.

=== 1980s ===
The line-up for the inaugural 1981–82 Connacht Senior League, eventually won by Sligo Rovers Reserves

In 1981 seven clubs – Mervue United, Sligo Rovers Reserves, Castlerea Celtic, Salthill Devon, Ballina Rovers, Tuam Celtic and UCG – formed the Connacht Senior League. Mervue United beat Sligo Rovers for the first trophy on offer, the League Cup. After Sligo Rovers scored two late goals to win their penultimate league game against Mervue 3–2, the league title was decided on the last day of the season. Three teams — Castlereagh Celtic, Mervue United and Sligo Rovers — all had a chance of becoming the inaugural league champions, with Sligo Rovers beating Castlerea Celtic in the final game to claim the title. Had Castlerea won, they would have forced a 3-way playoff for the league.

After Sligo's championship in 1981–82, Mervue United won the following two CSL titles; although — as goal difference wasn't taken into account — the club required three play-off matches to beat Salthill Devon to the 1983–84 title. The Incentive Cup was introduced in the 1981–82 season with Tuam Celtic beating UCG in the inaugural final. Ballinasloe Town joined the league in 1982–83, followed by Galway United's reserve team in 1983–84, to bring the total teams in the competition to nine. In 1984–85, league holders Mervue became the first CSL club to take part in the FAI Cup. The Galway club went out to the FAI Cup holders UCD, losing 2–1 to the League of Ireland side. Mervue United later lost out on the league title to their local rivals, as Galway United Reserves won the 1984–85 Connacht Senior League ahead of Mervue.

Galway United Reserves proceeded to win another league title in 1986, beating UCG 4–3 in a playoff. However, the league had been reduced to eight teams after Sligo Rovers pulled their reserve team at the start of the season. The withdrawal was seen as a cost cutting measure, necessitated by the relegation of the club's first team in the 1984–85 League of Ireland season, after the introduction of a national second tier. In the same season, discussions between Connacht and Ulster clubs were held regarding a proposal to expand the CSL into a North West League. This idea was abandoned following the emergence of the Ulster Senior League. However the potential financial strain of the North West league saw Castlerea Celtic and Ballina Rovers return to junior league status while Sligo Rovers had already pulled their reserve team in 1985 likely due to losses arising from their senior sides demotion to the League of Ireland First Division. After one season in 1986-87 which only consisted of six clubs, all from County Galway, membership started to improve with Mayo clubs Castlebar Celtic, Westport United and Ballina Town joining. Gentex of Athlone also joined for the 1987–88 season but withdrew in spring due to membership not being sanctioned by the Leinster Football Association. That same season also saw a Connacht Senior League XI take part in the League of Ireland cup generally appearing in a four team midwest group.

=== 1990s ===
The decade began with first titles for UCG followed by Salthill but with Tuam Celtic departing. Sligo Rovers Reserves rejoined after an attempt to join the Ulster Senior League was blocked by the Connacht FA and Mervue also rejoined after a two season absence beginning in 89 while Longford Town Reserves became the first new entrant in the nineties. Salthill Devon's title saw them become the first CSL champions to be invited to play in the League of Ireland Cup replacing the league XI who'd taken part previously. In 1992–93 Mervue United won a quartet, winning the league title, the Shield, the Connacht Senior Cup and the Connacht Senior League Challenge Cup. This was followed by further membership increase including Gentex of Athlone rejoining with neighbours St.Peters followed by Straide & Foxford United and Galway Hibernians. A move to create two divisions began with the 1994–95 league split into two groups with the winner of each group meeting in a title play-off final. Newcomers Straide & Foxford United beat Castlebar Celtic 1-0 to become champions. The top three teams from the 1994–95 groups plus the winner of a play-off between the two fourth placed teams made up the Premiership for the 1995-96 season. UCG won the Premiership while Ballinasloe Town were the First Division winners. However the two division format was abandoned and the 1996–97 season saw the league revert to a single division and membership began to dwindle. Between 1996–97 and 1999–2000 Mervue United were league champions four times in a row but the league disbanded in the summer of 2000 after losing three teams. Mervue United and UCG, now known as NUI Galway F.C. after the university's rebrand in 1997, opted to enter the League of Ireland U21 Division while Castlebar Celtic decided to return to the Mayo Association Football League.

=== Possible revival ===
In April 2013 discussions involving John Delaney and the Football Association of Ireland were held regarding reviving the Connacht Senior League. Representatives of thirteen clubs were invited to a meeting hosted by the Connacht Football Association at the McWilliam Park Hotel in Claremorris. The thirteen invited clubs included Westport United, Castlebar Celtic, Ballina Town, Salthill Devon, Mervue United, the Galway United Supporters’ Trust, NUI Galway, Sligo Rovers, St John's Athletic, Ballinsloe Town, Longford Town, Athlone Town and Willow Park. It was reported that Salthill Devon and Mervue United would play in the new Connacht Senior League after they dropped out of the League of Ireland First Division to make way for the new Galway United. However, in June 2013 the Connacht Tribune reported that the plans were shelved due to a lack of sufficient interest from the clubs. The three League of Ireland clubs, Sligo Rovers, Athlone Town and Longford Town, favoured a summer league, while the organisers had proposed a September to May format. The cost of running a CSL team in addition to their first team also reportedly dissuaded some League of Ireland clubs.

== League pyramid ==
As of November 2024, there is no promotion or relegation system in place between the League of Ireland First Division (Level 2 of the national league system) and the intermediate provincial leagues (Level 3 of the system), which included Connacht.

Two divisions existed in the Connacht Senior League for the 1994–95 and 1995–96 seasons; the Premiership and the First Division.

Colour-coding key
Intermediate (levels 3–6)
Junior (level 7)

Pyramid level	League(s) / division(s)
3	Connacht Senior League; Premiership 0 clubs – Defunct
4	Connacht Senior League; First Division 0 clubs – Defunct
5	None
6	None
7	Galway & District League Premier Division – 10 clubs Mayo Super League – 10 clubs Roscommon & District League Premier Division – 8 clubs Sligo and Leitrim Super League – 13 clubs
8	Galway & District League Championship – 12 clubs Mayo Premier League – 9 clubs Roscommon & District Division One – 9 clubs Sligo and Leitrim Premier League – 13 clubs
9	Galway & District League Division 1 – 10 clubs Mayo League One – 8 clubs Roscommon & District Division Two – 12 clubs
10	Galway & District League Division 2 – 10 clubs Mayo League Two – 10 clubs
11	Galway & District League Division 3 – TBD clubs

== Cup competitions ==
In addition to playing in the Connacht Senior League, clubs from the league were also eligible to play in a number of cup competitions. When the league was formed in 1981–82, the organizers also introduced two cup competitions. Mervue United defeated Sligo Rovers Reserves in the final of the inaugural League Cup, a pre-season competition featuring two legs per round. In 1988–89 this competition was renamed the League Shield. The second cup competition was the Connacht Senior League Challenge Cup. This was played at the end of the season. Mervue United were the inaugural winners. In 1982–83 a third cup, the Incentive Cup, was introduced. It initially featured the two most improved sides who had failed to win another trophy. Tuam Celtic were the first winners. In 1989–90 the format was changed to include teams knocked out in the first round of the Challenge Cup. Castlebar Celtic became the first winners under the new format. In 1986–87 CSL teams, together with Ulster Senior League teams played in the one-off North West Cup. Galway United reached the final but lost to Derry City. Connacht Senior League teams also played in the Connacht Senior Cup and national cup competitions such as FAI Cup, the FAI Intermediate Cup and the FAI Junior Cup. From 1990–91 onwards, the CSL champions or best placed non-reserve team were also invited to play in the League of Ireland Cup. Salthill Devon, Castlebar Celtic and Mervue United all went on to play in this competition.

== Representative team ==
In 1983–84 a Connacht Senior League representative team played a Munster Senior League XI and lost 2–1. In 1986–87 the representative team defeated Munster and a Leinster Senior League XI in an Interprovincial series. Between 1987–88 and 1990–91 the representative team played in the League of Ireland Cup. On all four occasions they played in a regional group that also included Galway United's first team, Limerick and Newcastle West.

== Teams ==
Participating clubs included the reserve teams of three League of Ireland clubs – Sligo Rovers, Galway United and Longford Town. The league also featured three future members of the A Championship – Mervue United, Salthill Devon and Castlebar Celtic. The former two also played in the League of Ireland First Division. Nineteen different teams played in the league at one point or another. The majority came from Connacht but Leinster teams from bordering counties were also invited to join. The league's membership usually averaged between eight and ten clubs and peaked in the 1995–96 season when it featured fourteen clubs. Throughout its history the CSL suffered regularly from clubs dropping out and only two teams, Salthill Devon and UCG/NUI Galway featured every season.

Team	Home town/suburb	Ground	Years
Ballina Town	Ballina, County Mayo	Belleek Park	1989–2000
Ballina Rovers	Ballina, County Mayo		1981–1986
Ballinasloe Town	Ballinasloe		1982–1997
Castlebar Celtic	Castlebar	Celtic Park	1987–2000
Castlerea Celtic	Castlerea		1981–1986
Galway United Reserves	Galway	Terryland Park	1983–2000
Galway Hibernians	Galway		1994–1996
Gentex	Athlone		1987; 1993–1998
Longford Town Reserves	Longford	Strokestown Road	1991–1993; 1995–1997
Longford Celtic	Longford		1995–1996
Manulla FC	Manulla, County Mayo		1997–1998
Mervue United	Mervue	Fahy's Field	1981–1989; 1991–2000
Salthill Devon	Salthill	Drom Soccer Park	1981–2000
Sligo Rovers Reserves	Sligo	Sligo Showgrounds	1981–1985; 1990–2000
Straide & Foxford United	Foxford		1994–1999
St Peters	Athlone		1993–2000
Tuam Celtic	Tuam	Celtic Park	1981–1990
UCG/NUI Galway	Galway	Dangan	1981–2000
Westport United	Westport, County Mayo	Sports Park	1988–1995

== List of winners ==
Season	Winner	Play-off	Runners-up
1999–00	Mervue United		NUI Galway
1998–99	Mervue United		NUI Galway
1997–98	Mervue United		NUI Galway
1996–97	Mervue United		Straide & Foxford United
1995–96	UCG		Straide & Foxford United
1994–95	Straide & Foxford United	1–0 (Note: Play-off between two group winners)	Castlebar Celtic
1993–94	Sligo Rovers Reserves	3–1 (Note: Play-off after two teams finished level on points)	Galway United Reserves
1992–93	Mervue United		Sligo Rovers Reserves
1991–92	Sligo Rovers Reserves		Castlebar Celtic
1990–91	Salthill Devon		Sligo Rovers Reserves
1989–90	UCG		Salthill Devon
1988–89	Castlebar Celtic		Salthill Devon
1987–88	Galway United Reserves		Castlebar Celtic
1986–87	Mervue United		Galway United Reserves
1985–86	Galway United Reserves	4–3 (Note: Play-off after two teams finished level on points)	UCG
1984–85	Galway United Reserves		Mervue United
1983–84	Mervue United	3–0 (Note: Mervue United win title after three play-offs. The first two were both 2–2 draws)	Salthill Devon
1982–83	Mervue United		Sligo Rovers Reserves
1981–82	Sligo Rovers Reserves		Mervue United
1973–74	Westport United		DESCPO (Galway)
1970–71	Gilrooly Rovers	7–5 (Note: Played over two legs)	Castlebar Celtic
1969–70	Abbeyville (Sligo)		
1967–68	Galway Bohemians	4–0	Carraroe
1966–67	Collegians	6–0	Galway Bohemians
1960–61	Galway Bohemians		Rovers
1949–50	Sligo Celtic	2–2	Galway Rovers (Note: No details of replay found)
1948–49	Galway Rovers		
1947–48	Sligo Stars	7–1	Castlebar Celtic
1946–47	Galway Bohemians	7–1	Roscommon Town
Not contested due to World War II
1939–40	Galway Bohemians		
1938–39	Galway		Westport United (Note: Westport United did not appear)
1937–38	Galway Bohemians	5–3	Sligo St Marys
1936–37	Galway Bohemians	2–1	Sligo St Marys (Note: Played in October 1937, heldover from previous season)

== See also ==
- Leinster Senior League (association football)
- Munster Senior League (association football)
- Ulster Senior League (association football)
- Galway & District League
- Mayo Association Football League
