= Connacht Football Association =

Regional governing body for soccer in Ireland

- Region served: Connacht
- Parent organization: Football Association of Ireland

The Connacht Football Association is the governing body for association football in the Irish province of Connacht. It is affiliated to the Football Association of Ireland and is currently responsible for organizing the Connacht Junior Cup and four junior leagues – the Galway & District League, the Mayo Association Football League, the Roscommon and District Football League and the Sligo/Leitrim & District League as well as numerous other leagues and cup competitions for junior teams. In the past it has also been responsible for organizing the Connacht Senior Cup and the Connacht Senior League. However both of these competitions are currently inactive.

== Cup competitions ==
- Connacht Junior Cup
- Michael Byrne Cup
  - Connacht Senior Cup
  - Connacht Senior League Challenge Cup

== Affiliated leagues ==
- Galway & District League
- Mayo Association Football League
- Roscommon and District Football League
- Sligo/Leitrim & District League
- Mayo Women's Football League
  - Connacht Senior League

== Representative team ==
A Connacht representative team competes in the FAI Intermediate Interprovincial Tournament against teams representing the Ulster Senior League, the Leinster Senior League and Munster Senior League.

== See also ==
- Irish Universities Football Union
- Leinster Football Association
- Munster Football Association
- Women's Football Association of Ireland
- Galway Football Association
