= Celtic Park (disambiguation) =

Celtic Park most commonly refers to the home ground of Celtic F.C., based in Glasgow, Scotland.

Celtic Park can also refer to:

- Celtic Park (1888–92), the original Celtic Park in Glasgow
- Celtic Park (Belfast), a former stadium in Belfast, Northern Ireland, the home ground of the defunct Belfast Celtic F.C.
- Celtic Park (Brooklyn), a former soccer stadium in New York, US, the home ground of St. Mary's Celtic and Brooklyn Hispano
- Celtic Park (Castlebar), a football stadium in Castlebar, Ireland, the home ground of Castlebar Celtic F.C.
- Celtic Park (Cwmbran), a football stadium in Cwmbran, Wales, the home ground of Cwmbran Celtic F.C.
- Celtic Park (Derry), a GAA stadium in Derry, Northern Ireland, the home ground of the Derry GAA hurling and Gaelic football teams
- Celtic Park (Queens) a former venue for Irish sports in New York, US
- Celtic Park (Tuam), a football stadium in Tuam, Ireland, the home ground of Tuam Celtic A.F.C.
- Donegal Celtic Park, a stadium in Belfast, Northern Ireland, the home ground of Donegal Celtic F.C.
- Celtic Park (Killarney), a football stadium in Killarney, Ireland, the home ground of Killarney Celtic F.C.
