= Colga F.C. =

- Full name: Colga Football Club
- Founded: 1996
- Ground: Kilcornan Lodge
- Chairperson: Stephen Moran
- Manager: Peter Greaney
- League: Galway & District League
- 2025–26: GFA Premier Division, 1st of 10
- Website: colgafc.ie
Home colours	Away colours

Colga Football Club is an Irish association football club from Kilcolgan, in south County Galway. A community organisation that is run by its volunteer members, the club plays out of Kilcornan Lodge in nearby Clarinbridge. Their senior men's team currently competes in the Galway & District League.

As of July 2021, the club had over 500 players and 70 volunteer coaches who run 25 male & female teams, from Under-6s up to adult level.

== History ==
Colga F.C. is a football club from Kilcolgan, Ireland, which was founded in 1996. It is a community voluntary organisation run by its members for the benefit of their families and neighbors. The club promotes soccer among girls and boys of all ages.

Colga Football Club was formed in March 1996, and officially opened in June 1996. It commenced competing in the 1996- 1997 season, and has competed in every season since at various levels.

By November 2008, the club's men's team were competing in the top division of the Galway & District League.

The senior women's side entered the Galway & District League in 2011, after merging with Ashe Rovers, and managed to win the title in their debut season. The team was able to improve on this result the following season, when they celebrated a league and cup double. In 2013, Colga Ladies made it to the final of the FAI Women's Intermediate Cup against Douglas Hall but narrowly lost 1-0.

In 2022, Colga men's team won promotion to the Galway Premier Division, the top tier of the Galway & District League. In the 2025–26 season, Colga won the Galway Premier Division for the first time in the club's history. The club also qualified for their first Connacht Junior Cup final the same season.

== Ground ==
Colga's home ground is situated at Kilcornan Lodge, beside Clarenbridge village and within Kilcornan Woods. The club owns the 16-acre site which houses two full-size grass pitches and a training area. In addition, a full sized artificial turf pitch was completed in December 2023.

== Squad ==
As of 2025–26 season.

Note: Flags indicate national team as defined under FIFA eligibility rules; some limited exceptions apply. Players may hold more than one non-FIFA nationality.

No.	Pos.	Nation	Player
1	GK	IRL	Mark Greaney (captain)
3	DF		Jackson Da Silva
4	DF		Bruno De Oliviera
5	DF	IRL	Liam Corcoran
6	DF	IRL	Nathan Ward
7	MF	IRL	Ben Lalor
8	MF	IRL	Joe Gaughan
9	FW	IRL	Jamie Cummins
10	MF	IRL	Neil Greaney
11	MF		Lucas De Paula
12	DF	IRL	Andy Horan
13	MF		Guilherme Da Souza

No.	Pos.	Nation	Player
14		IRL	Conor Slevin
15	FW		Jorge Lopes
16	FW	IRL	Ross Ward
17			Jack Masciarelli
18	MF	IRL	Óisín Duffy
19	DF	IRL	Eddie Silke
20		IRL	Mikey Donoghue
21	MF	IRL	Padráig Pearl
22	FW	IRL	Tom Daly
23	FW	IRL	Calum Browne
24		IRL	Luke Murray
25	GK	IRL	Padráig Dunne
—		IRL	Jack Greaney
—		IRL	Seán Langan
—		IRL	Cillian Sammon

== Honours ==
Galway & District League

- Premier Division
  - Winners: 2025–26
- Championship (formerly First Division / Division 1)
  - Winners (2): 2006–07, 2021–22
- Division 1 (formerly Division 2)
  - Winners (1): 2020–21
- Division 2 (formerly Division 3)
  - Winners (1): 2015–16

== Staff and committee ==
=== Technical staff ===
Position	Name
Manager	Peter Greaney
Assistant Manager	Gary Forde
Analyst	Darren Spelman
Logistics	Iggy Greaney
Strength & Conditioning; Coach	Fionn Greaney
Goalkeeper Coach	David Fox

=== Club committee ===
Position	Name
Chairperson	Stephen Moran
Vice-Chairperson	Paul Collins
Secretary	Paula Kealy
Registrar	Rory Macadam
Treasurer	Cathy Turke
Director of Football (Men)	Peter Greaney
Director of Football (Women)	Alana Moran
Grounds Officer	Mike Bindon
Child Welfare Officer	David Kilkelly

- Coach : (Republic of Ireland) Oliver Mullins
- Physiotherapist : (Republic of Ireland) Mark Greaney

== See also ==
- Colga of Kilcolgan
