= Ballina Town F.C. =

Irish football club, based in Ballina, Co. Mayo

- Full name: Ballina Town Football Club
- Nicknames: The Town "The Na"
- Founded: 8 December 1961; 64 years ago
- Ground: Belleek Park; Ballina, County Mayo
- Chairman: Gerry Knight
- Manager: Mick Duffy
- League: Mayo Association Football League; Mayo Women's Football League; Connacht Senior League
- Website: ballinatownfc.ie
Home colours	Away colours

Ballina Town F.C. is an Irish association football club based in Ballina, County Mayo. Their senior men's team play in the Mayo Association Football League. The club previously played in the Connacht Senior League and qualified for the 1989–90 FAI Cup. Their senior women's team play in the Mayo Women's Football League and have previously played in the FAI Women's Cup.

== History ==
=== Early years ===
Ballina Town Football Club was founded on 8 December 1961 in a public house called Geraghty's in Ballina. Originally the club was named St Patrick's F.C. but six months later it adopted the name of its hometown. The club subsequently joined the Mayo Association Football League and finished as runners-up in 1966–67. They were runners up again in 1973–74, 1974–75, 1985–86 and 1987–88. In 1976–77 they also won the Connacht Junior Cup.

=== Connacht Senior League ===
Between 1989–90 and 1999–2000 Ballina Town's senior team played in the Connacht Senior League (CSL). In 1989–90, while playing in the CSL, Ballina Town became the first club from County Mayo to play in the first round of the FAI Cup. However they were defeated 4–0 by Shelbourne. Ballina Town were also runners-up to Mervue United in the 1992–93 Connacht Senior Cup.

=== Mayo champions ===
After finishing as runners-up in the Mayo Association Football League on five previous occasions, Ballina Town became Mayo champions for the first time in 1988–89. They then had to wait for twenty years before winning a second title in 2009. They retained the title in 2010 and won a fourth title in 2013.

== Women's team ==
Ballina Town also field a women's team in the Mayo Women's Football League. They have also previously played in the FAI Women's Cup. In 2007 Ballina Town also represented Ireland in a tournament in Italy, playing against teams from the host country as well as Iceland and Ireland. They finished fourth in the six team tournament. In 2006 and 2014 Ballina Town won the WFAI Intermediate Cup. In the 2014 final they defeated Douglas Hall 3–1 in the final at Turners Cross.

== Ground ==
Ballina Town play their home matches at Belleek Park which consists of two playing pitches and a flood-lit all-weather pitch. The main pitch is known as the Pete Murray Pitch. Thanks mainly to Irish National Lottery funding, work commenced in 2004 on new changing rooms at Belleek Park. This development was used for the first time in February 2006. The clubhouse was officially opened by John Delaney on 21 July 2008. Work commenced on an all-weather facility in Belleek in December 2010 and it was first used in January 2011.

== Notable former players ==
Republic of Ireland women's international

- (Republic of Ireland) Sarah Rowe

Republic of Ireland youth international

- (Republic of Ireland) David Cawley

== Honours ==
=== Senior Men's Team ===
- Mayo Association Football League
  - Winners: 1988–89, 2009, 2010, 2013: 4
  - Runners Up: 1966–67, 1973–74, 1974–75, 1985–86, 1987–88, 2007, 2008: 7
- Connacht Senior Cup
  - Runners Up: 1992–93, 2009–10: 2
- Connacht Junior Cup
  - Winners: 1976–77: 1
  - Runners Up: 1972–73: 1

=== Senior Women's Team ===
- WFAI Intermediate Cup
  - Winners: 2006, 2014: 2
