= Galway Hibernians A.F.C. =

Irish football club

Galway Hibernians
- Full name: Galway Hibernians Association Football Club
- Nicknames: Galway Hibs, Hibs
- Founded: 1942
- Ground: Bohermore Football Pitch, Seán Mulvoy Road, Bohermore, Galway
- Chairperson: Cameron Loughnane
- Manager: Stephen Walsh
- League: Galway & District League
- 2025–26: GFA Championship Division, 2nd of 10 (promoted)
Home colours

Galway Hibernians Association Football Club is an Irish association football club from Bohermore, in Galway City. As of 2026, the club's senior men's team was playing in the Galway & District League. The club have previously played in the Connacht Senior League and the FAI Cup.

The club is community run, with the club fielding teams in Galway leagues from underage to adult level.

== History ==
The club was founded in 1942, making them the second oldest club in Galway, behind only Galway Bohemians.

From 1994 to 1996, the club played in the Connacht Senior League. They were invited into the league when it split into two tiers and after the club had won the Connacht Senior Cup defeating Mervue United 3–1 in the final in 1987. In the 1994–95 season, Hibs once again made it to the Senior Cup final, where they would lose 0–2 against Mervue United. At the end of the 1995–96 season, Hibs won promotion however pulled out of the league which contributed to the Connacht Senior League returning to just one division the season afterwards.

In 2001, the club won a quadruple, winning the Joe Ryan Cup, the Michael Byrne Cup, the Brod Trill Cup and the Connacht Cup in the same season.

The club took part in the 2005 FAI Cup, where in the first round they were drawn against Dublin side Mount Merrion. After a 2–2 draw up in Dublin the clubs played a replay back in Terryland Park, which Hibs would win on penalties following a 0–0 draw. In the second round, Hibs were drawn against League of Ireland First Division club Kildare County. Hibs would lose 1–4 away at Station Road, with their one goal coming from a header by Eddie Ward.

In 2021, two of the clubs volunteers, Paddy Connolly and Joe O'Reilly were honoured by the Mayor of Galway, Mike Cubbard for their work with the club and contributions to soccer in Galway.

== Ground ==
Galway Hibernians ground in Bohermore, Galway City

Galway Hibernians play their football in on the Bohermore Football Pitch which is on the Seán Mulvoy Road in Bohermore, Galway City. Their ground is located directly next to the Galway Shopping Centre. The ground contains an astro pitch and one full football pitch.

== Technical staff ==
Position	Name
Manager	Stephen Walsh
Assistant manager	Nathan Ward
Coach	Brendan Clarke

== Notable former players ==
Republic of Ireland international

- (Republic of Ireland) David Forde

Republic of Ireland U21 internationals

- (Republic of Ireland) Tony Folan

Republic of Ireland U19 internationals

- (Republic of Ireland) Ryan Casey

== Honours ==
- GFA Premier Division:
  - Winners: 1991–92, 1993–94, 2000–01, 2005–06
  - Runners-up: 2010–11, 2011–12, 2013–14
- GFA Championship Division:
  - Runners-up: 2025–26
- Connacht Cup:
  - Winners: 1950–51, 1982–83, 1993–94, 1994–95, 1999–2000, 2000–01
  - Runners-up: 1985–86
- Connacht Senior Cup:
  - Winners: 1986–87
  - Runners-up: 1981–82, 1994–95
- Michael Byrne Cup:
  - Winners: 2000–01
  - Runners-up: 2013–14
- Joe Ryan Cup:
  - Winners: 2000–01
  - Runners-up: 2025–26
