= WUFC =

WUFC may refer to:

In sport:

- Waterford United F.C.
- Watton United F.C.
- Welling United F.C.
- Western United FC
- Westbury United F.C.
- Westport United F.C.
- Whitchurch United F.C.
- Whitton United F.C.
- Winsford United F.C.
- Winslow United F.C.
- Winterbourne United F.C.
- Witney United F.C.
- Wolverhampton United F.C.
- Woodford United F.C.
- Worthing United F.C.

Other uses:

- WMEX (AM), a radio station (1510 AM) licensed to serve Boston, Massachusetts, United States, which used the call sign WUFC from 2012 through 2014
