= Mayo Women's Football League =

- Founded: 2000
- Country: (Republic of Ireland) Ireland
- Confederation: UEFA
- Divisions: Premier Division; Division 1 Division 2 Under 19; Under 17; Under 14; Under 12
- Domestic cup(s): WFAI Intermediate Cup; Connaught Cup
- League cup(s): Mayo Cup; Mary Walsh Cup; Mayo Shield
- Website: Mayo Women's Football League

The Mayo Women's Football League is a women's association football league featuring teams from County Mayo. It is the sister league of the Mayo Association Football League. It has previously been known as the Mayo Ladies League. The league is a summer league, beginning in April and ending in September. In 2015 the league was sponsored by Artec Facilities Management, a company based in Belmullet. Teams from the league also compete for the Mayo Cup, the Mary Walsh Cup and the Mayo Shield. They also enter the Connaught Cup and the WFAI Intermediate Cup. The league's representative team won the 2006 FAI Women's Cup and then represented the Republic of Ireland in the 2007–08 UEFA Women's Cup.

== Premier Division Clubs ==
Premier Division - 2025 season

Team	Home town/suburb	Home ground
Castlebar Town	Castlebar	
Conn Rangers	Drumrevagh, Ballina	Mount Falcon
Manulla F.C.	Manulla, Balla	Carramore
Straide & Foxford United	Foxford & Straide	Green Road
Swinford F.C.	Swinford	James McEvaddy Park

Castlebar Celtic had planned to enter a team for the 2015 season but withdrew due to a lack of players.

== Division One Clubs ==
2025 Season

Team	Home town/suburb	Ground
Claremorris A.F.C.	Claremorris	
Killala A.F.C.	Killala	Courthouse Street Pitch
Kilmore F.C.	Lurgacloy, Belmullet	
Kiltimagh Knock United	Kiltimagh & Knock	C.M.S. Park
Westport United	Westport	United Park

== Other Notable Clubs ==
Team	Home town/suburb	Ground
Achill Rovers	Achill Island	Fr. O'Brien Park
Ballina Town	Ballina, County Mayo	Belleek Park

== List of recent winners ==
Season	Winner	Runners-up
2024	Manulla	Swinford
2016		
2015		
2014	Manulla	Castlebar Town
2013	Manulla	Castlebar Town
2012	Kilmore	
2011	Castlebar Celtic	
2010		
2009	Castlebar Celtic	
2008	Ballinrobe	Knock/Kiltimagh

== Representative team ==
=== FAI Women's Cup ===
In 2004 the Mayo Ladies League entered a representative team in the FAI Women's Cup for the first time. In 2005 they reached the semi-finals but lost 2–1 to Peamount United. In 2006 Mayo went one stage further and reached the final after defeating the Limerick Ladies League, Wilton United and Lifford Ladies. In the final at Richmond Park they played a UCD team featuring Nicola Sinnott and Sylvia Gee. Mayo won the cup after defeating UCD 1–0, with Aoife Herbert scoring the winning goal after just thirteen minutes. In 2007 Mayo were quarter finalists, losing 2–1 to Lifford Ladies.

=== 2007–08 UEFA Women's Cup ===
As a result of winning the 2006 FAI Women's Cup, the Mayo Ladies League qualified to represent the Republic of Ireland in the 2007–08 UEFA Women's Cup. They were drawn in Group A3 along with Neulengbach, Hibernian Ladies and Gol Częstochowa. The competition format saw Mayo travel to Austria in August 2007 to play in a mini-tournament to decide who would progress to the next round. In addition to playing association football, several members of the Mayo squad including Yvonne Byrne, Aoife Herbert, Cora Staunton and Michelle Ruane also played Gaelic football and were prominent members of Mayo senior ladies' football team during the 2007 All-Ireland Senior Ladies' Football Championship. The UEFA Women's Cup tournament clashed with a quarter-final game against Monaghan. Byrne, Herbert and Staunton all returned to Ireland during the tournament to play for the Mayo Gaelic football team and as a result were not available for all three games. Byrne, Herbert and Staunton all went on to represent the Mayo GAA team in the 2007 All-Ireland Senior Ladies' Football Championship final.

==== Squad ====
Note: Flags indicate national team as defined under FIFA eligibility rules; some limited exceptions apply. Players may hold more than one non-FIFA nationality.

No.	Pos.	Nation	Player
1	GK	EIR	Yvonne Byrne
—		EIR	Karen Lilly
—		EIR	Anne Moran
—		EIR	Michelle Ruane
—		EIR	Aine McLean
—		EIR	Katie Walsh

No.	Pos.	Nation	Player
—		EIR	Jackie Mulligan
—		EIR	Cara Cooke
—		EIR	Anne-Marie Davenport
—		EIR	Patricia Coyle
—		EIR	Cora Staunton
—		EIR	Aoife Herbert

==== Matches and final table ====
Pos	Team	Pld	W	D	L	GF	GA	GD	Pts
1	(Austria) Neulengbach	3	3	0	0	15	4	+11	9
2	(Scotland) Hibernian Ladies	3	2	0	1	15	5	+10	6
3	(Poland) Gol Częstochowa	3	1	0	2	6	13	−7	3
4	(Republic of Ireland) Mayo Ladies League	3	0	0	3	1	15	−14	0

9 August 2007
Gol Czestochowa	4–1	Mayo Ladies League
Otrebska 4', 90+2'; Stobba 49', 83'		Staunton 69'
11 August 2007
Neulengbach	3–0	Mayo Ladies League
Burger 7', 45'; Novotny 33'
14 August 2007
Hibernian	8–0	Mayo Ladies League
Kennedy 7'; Little 33', 55', 60', 90+1'; Kerr 45'; Ross 52', 77'
