= Connacht Senior League Challenge Cup =

- Organiser(s): Connacht Senior League
- Founded: 1981
- Region: Connacht
- Most championships: Mervue United (6)

The Connacht Senior League Challenge Cup was an association football cup competition featuring teams from the Connacht Senior League. It was the senior league cup competition of the Connacht Senior League between 1981 and 2000. It was later remained the Connacht Senior League Premiership Cup and in its final season was known as the Connacht Senior League Millennium Cup. The inaugural winners were Mervue United who also went on to become the competition's most successful club, winning the cup six times in total.

== History ==
When the Connacht Senior League was established in 1981–82 the organisers also introduced two league cup competitions. Mervue United defeated Sligo Rovers Reserves in the final of the inaugural League Cup, a pre-season competition featuring two legs per round. In 1988–89 this competition was renamed the League Shield. The second cup competition was the Connacht Senior League Challenge Cup. This was played at the end of the season. Mervue United were the inaugural winners and went on to win it four times in a row. In 1982–83 a third cup, the Incentive Cup, was introduced. It initially featured the two most improved sides who had failed to win another trophy. Tuam Celtic were the first winners. In 1989–90 the format was changed to include teams knocked out in the first round of the Challenge Cup. Castlebar Celtic became the first winners under the new format. Connacht Senior League teams also played in the separate Connacht Senior Cup which also featured teams from the four junior leagues based in the province – the Galway & District League, the Sligo-Leitrim League, the Mayo Association Football League and the Roscommon & District League. In 1994–95 when the Connacht Senior League was split into two groups the competition did not take place. In 1995–96 when the league featured two divisions there was also two league cups, the Premiership Cup and the First Division Cup. When the two divisions were scrapped after one season, the Premiership Cup name was retained.

== List of finals ==
Season	Winner	Score	Runners-up
1999–00	St Peters (Athlone)	3–0	Salthill Devon
1998–99	Galway United Reserves	2–0	Castlebar Celtic
1997–98	Castlebar Celtic	2–1	Mervue United
1996–97	UCG	2–1	Straide & Foxford United
1995–96	UCG	4–0	Salthill Devon
1994–95	No competition		
1993–94	Sligo Rovers Reserves	1–0	Galway United Reserves
1992–93	Mervue United	2–1	Ballinasloe Town
1991–92	Salthill Devon	2–0	Castlebar Celtic
1990–91	Sligo Rovers Reserves	1–0	Salthill Devon
1989–90	Salthill Devon	1–0	UCG
1988–89	Mervue United	1–0	UCG
1987–88	UCG	1–0	Castlebar Celtic
1986–87	UCG	1–0	Galway United Reserves
1985–86	Salthill Devon	1–0	Mervue United
1984–85	Mervue United	4–2	Castlerea Celtic
1983–84	Mervue United	1–0	Balinasloe Town
1982–83	Mervue United	4–0	Castlerea Celtic
1981–82	Mervue United	3–0	UCG
