= Connacht Senior Cup (association football) =

- Organiser(s): Connacht Football Association
- Founded: 1981
- Region: Connacht
- Most championships: Mervue United (6)

Connacht Senior Cup is an association football cup competition organised by the Connacht Football Association. This cup competition should not be confused with the more regularly played Connacht Junior Cup which has effectively been the top level competition for non-League of Ireland clubs when the Senior Cup has been inactive.

== History ==
=== Connacht Senior League ===
Between 1981 and 1982 and 1999–2000, when the Connacht Senior League, was active the Connacht Senior Cup featured the members of the CSL and the champions of four junior leagues based in the province – the Galway & District League, the Sligo-Leitrim League, the Mayo Association Football League and the Roscommon & District League. Junior sides did well and featured in the first ten finals, winning four of them. In later seasons there were two more junior winners but all-Connacht Senior League finals became more common. The competition ended when the Senior league ended in 2000. During this era teams from the CSL also played in a separate league cup competition known as the Connacht Senior League Challenge Cup.

=== Revival ===
In 2007 a second Connacht Senior Cup was launched. This featured the top two teams from the Galway & District League, the Sligo-Leitrim League, the Mayo Association Football League and the Roscommon & District League plus the Connacht teams that played in the League of Ireland.

== List of finals ==
Season	Winner	Score	Runners-up	−15B.C
2009–10	Salthill Devon	7–0	Ballina Town	
2008–09	Westport United	2–1	Athenry	
2007–08	Galway United	2–0	Mervue United	
1999–00	Mervue United	4–2	St Peters (Athlone)	
1998–99	NUI Galway	7–1	Mervue United	
1997–98	Mervue United	1–0	Straide & Foxford United	
1996–97	Renmore	1–0	Salthill Devon	
1995–96	Galway United Reserves	2–1	UCG	
1994–95	Mervue United	2–0	Galway Hibernians	
1993–94	West United	2–1	Straide & Foxford United	
1992–93	Mervue United	2–1	Ballina Town	
1991–92	Salthill Devon	1–0	UCG	
1990–91	Salthill Devon	1–0	Westport United	
1989–90	Salthill Devon	1–1 (Note: Salthill Devon won after 3–3 draw and penalties)	Calry Bohemians	
1988–89	Calry Bohemians	5–0 (Note: Replay after 1–1 draw)	Mervue United	
1987–88	Calry Bohemians	3–0 (Note: Replay after 1–1 draw)	Mervue United	
1986–87	Galway Hibernians	3–1	Mervue United	
1985–86	Dynamo Blues	2–1	UCG	
1984–85	Galway United Reserves	1–0	Castlebar Celtic	
1983–84	Mervue United	2–1	Collegians	
1982–83	Mervue United	1–0	Collegians	
1981–82	Sligo Rovers Reserves	3–2	Galway Hibernians	
