= Celtic Park (Castlebar) =

Association football stadium in Castlebar, Ireland

- Interactive map of Celtic Park
- Address: Pavilion Road
- Location: Castlebar; County Mayo, Ireland
- Coordinates: 53°51′9″N 9°17′51″W
- Owner: Castlebar Celtic
- Operator: Castlebar Celtic
- Capacity: 1,500
- Surface: Grass
- Field size: 100 by 60 yards (91 by 55 m)

Construction
- Opened: 1954
- Renovated: 2001

Tenants
- Castlebar Celtic Women (WNL); Castlebar Celtic Men (Mayo Super League)

Celtic Park (Irish: Páirc na gCeilteach) is an association football stadium based in Castlebar, County Mayo. It was the home ground of Castlebar Celtic who played in the Women's National League (WNL), the top tier of Irish women's football between 2011 and 2016. It remains home to Castlebar Celtic's associated men's team, who play at regional level in the Mayo Association Football League.

== History ==
The ground is located on Pavilion Road in Castlebar and was formerly known as Flannelly's Field. Castlebar Celtic purchased Flannelly's Field in 1954 for £1,879. They also spent £123 on drainage and £400 renovating a clubhouse in Market Square. Two old CIÉ buses were procured to act as dressing rooms, bringing the total expenditure to £3,000. Most of the money was raised through a series of carnivals and dances.

The first match played in Celtic Park was a challenge game between Castlebar Celtic and Castlebar A on 4 May 1958. The first competitive game at the ground was played the following Sunday, when Celtic Park hosted the Mayo Area final of the Connaught Cup, between Castlebar Celtic and Westport United. Frank Roache scored the first competitive goal at Celtic Park as Castlebar won the final 1–0.

A new clubhouse at Celtic Park was opened on 11 August 1990. A challenge game between Castlebar Celtic and Shamrock Rovers was held to commemorate the occasion.

The ground was redeveloped in 2001 with new walls and dugouts.
