= GBFC =

The abbreviation GBFC may refer to one of the following football clubs:

- Galway Bohemians F.C.
- Gosport Borough F.C.
- Greenwich Borough F.C.
- Grimsby Borough F.C.
