= Cyril Guedjé =

Togolese footballer

Personal information
- Full name: Cyril Guedjé
- Date of birth: 19 June 1992 (age 34)
- Place of birth: Tsévié, Togo
- Height: 1.82 m (6 ft 0 in)
- Positions: Forward; winger

Team information
- Current team: Achill Rovers
- Number: 6

Youth career
- RSC Anderlecht
- K.V.C Westerlo

Senior career*
| Years | Team | Apps | (Gls) |
| 2010–2011 | Boluspor | 14 | (7) |
| 2011–2012 | Anges de Notsè | 28 | (18) |
| 2013–2015 | AS Togo-Port | 21 | (10) |
| 2015 | St Patrick's Athletic | 1 | (0) |
| 2015 | → Limerick (loan) | 3 | (0) |
| 2016–2017 | Ballyheane | 9 | (8) |
| 2017– | Achill Rovers | 12 | (9) |

International career
| 2011–2012 | Togo | 5 | (2) |
- * Club domestic league appearances and goals

Cyril Guedjé (born 19 June 1992) is a Togolese football forward who currently plays for Achill Rovers in the Mayo Association Football League, a lower league in the Republic of Ireland. He has played professionally for Boluspor, Anges de Notsè, AS Togo-Port, League of Ireland with St Patrick's Athletic and Limerick. He is a former Togo international.

== Club career ==
=== Early career ===
Guedjé was born in Tsévié, Togo but he moved to Belgium to play with the youth team of RSC Anderlecht before moving to K.V.C. Westerlo's youth team. His first club in senior football came when he moved to Turkey, playing for Boluspor. He returned to Togo after just one season, signing for Anges de Notsè before moving on to AS Togo-Port, another top division club, in the capital city of Lomé, where he would remain for 2 more seasons.

=== Return to Europe ===
A return to Europe was next on the cards for Guedjé as he went on trial with St Patrick's Athletic in the Republic of Ireland who are a regular competitor in the UEFA Champions League and UEFA Europa League. He impressed manager Liam Buckley enough to be offered a professional contract for the 2015 season with the Dublin based club and was officially signed on 5 March 2015, given the squad number 23. Guedjé's first appearance for Pats came on 13 March against Bray Wanderers at Richmond Park when he came on from the bench in the 86th minute to a brilliant reception from the supporters. This made him the first ever player from Togo to play in the League of Ireland. His second appearance came in the League Cup in a 4–1 win over Crumlin United where he impressed with his work rate but was substituted after 76 minutes due to injury. Although not receiving much game time due to injury and the form of the Saints' first choice attacking trio, Guedjé has become a cult hero for the Pats supporters, with several chants in his name being created which were well received by the Togolese striker. His next appearance came when he played the second half of the Saints 3–2 win over Patrick Vieira's Manchester City XI side at Richmond Park on 29 July 2015.

On the League of Ireland transfer deadline day, 31 July 2015, with Guedjé struggling to get playing time at Pats', he was sent on loan to last-placed Limerick to get playing time in their relegation fight with Sligo Rovers and Derry City. Guedjé made three league appearances for Limerick as they avoided automatic relegation. They lost the Promotion/relegation play-off final over two legs to Finn Harps and were relegated.

At the end of the 2015 League of Ireland season, Limerick did not opt to sign Guedjé on a permanent basis and he was not offered a new contract by his parent club St Patrick's Athletic, being released as a free agent.

After being released, Guedjé stayed in Ireland and signed for amateur club Ballyheane of the Mayo Association Football League in summer 2016. He scored a hattrick on his debut vs Iorras Aointaithe on 14 August 2016. In March 2017, Guedjé teamed up with former Cameroon international Joseph N'Do at Achill Rovers, moving to Achill Island to live while studying at Galway-Mayo Institute of Technology's Castlebar campus.

== International career ==
Guedjé has made 5 appearances for the Togo national football team, scoring 2 goals. He was part of the Togo team that won the WAFU Nations Cup in 2011, beating Nigeria in the final. He scored in the semi-final in a 4–2 win over Liberia.

== Honours ==
Togo

- WAFU Nations Cup: 2011
