= 2011 WAFU Nations Cup =

Tournament details
- Host country: Nigeria
- Dates: 5–15 May 2011
- Teams: 8 (from 1 confederation)

Final positions
- Champions: Togo (1st title)
- Runners-up: Nigeria
- Third place: Liberia
- Fourth place: Ghana

Tournament statistics
- Matches played: 9
- Goals scored: 32 (3.56 per match)

The 2011 WAFU Nations Cup is an international home-based football competition. It was hosted in Nigeria. The competition is organised by the West Africa Football Union (WAFU).

All games will be played at Abeokuta and Ijebu Ode.

== Participants ==
- Benin
- Ghana
- Liberia
- Niger (replaced withdrew Ivory Coast)
- Nigeria
- Togo
- Gambia (withdrew)
- Mali (withdrew)
- Senegal (withdrew)

== Group stage ==
The draw for the group stage took place on April 28, 2011.

=== Group A ===
Team	Pld	W	D	L	GF	GA	GD	Pts
Nigeria	2	2	0	0	5	0	+5	6
Liberia	2	1	0	1	2	2	0	3
Niger	2	0	0	2	1	6	−5	0

Mali withdrew.

5 May 2011

Nigeria	1–0	Liberia
Ehiosun 24'	Report

Abeokuta

7 May 2011

Nigeria	4–0	Niger
Ibenegbu 5', 35'; Ehiosun 55'; Agwuocha 65'

Abeokuta
9 May 2011

Liberia	2–1	Niger

Abeokuta

=== Group B ===
Team	Pld	W	D	L	GF	GA	GD	Pts
Togo	2	1	0	1	3	3	0	3
Ghana	2	1	0	1	3	3	0	3

Senegal and Gambia withdrew.

As there were only two teams left in the group, it was decided that the teams should play each other twice to determine a group winner. Both teams automatically qualified for the semi-final stage.

8 May 2011

Togo	1–2	Ghana

10 May 2011

Ghana	1–2	Togo
Penalties
	3–4

== Knockout Phase ==
Semi-finals
12 May
Nigeria	2
Ghana	1
12 May
Liberia	2
Togo	4

Final
15 May
Nigeria	2
Togo	3
Third place
14 May
Ghana	1
Liberia	3

=== Semi-finals ===
12 May 2011

Nigeria	2–1	Ghana
Ekigho Ehiosun 84', 119'	Report	Ibrahim Aziz 66'

Abeokuta
12 May 2011

Liberia	2–4	Togo
		Cyril Guedjé (?)

Abeokuta

=== Third place ===
14 May 2011

Ghana	1–3	Liberia

Abeokuta

=== Final ===
15 May 2011

Nigeria	2–3	Togo
Ikechukwu Ibenegbu 25', 45' (pen.)	Report	Atakora Lalawele 2', 60'; Wome Senome 20'

Abeokuta
