= Cregmore (Lackagh parish) =

Townland in County Galway, Ireland

Cregmore An Chreig Mhór
- Village
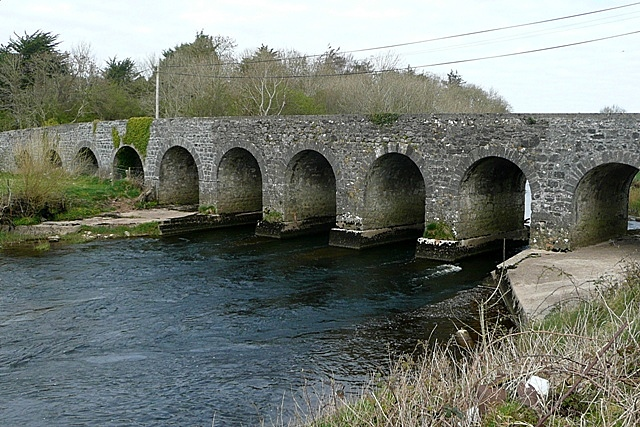
- Cregmore Bridge

- Location in Ireland
- Coordinates: 53.3386°N 8.8762°W
- Country: Ireland
- Province: Connacht
- County: County Galway
- Time zone: UTC±0 (WET)
  - Summer (DST): UTC+1 (IST)
- Eircode routing key: H91
- Telephone area code: +353(0)91
- Irish Grid Reference: M500282

Cregmore (Irish: An Chreig Mhór, meaning 'the big rock') is a rural townland in the parish of Lackagh, County Galway, Ireland. It is 13 km northeast of Galway city centre. Cregmore townland, which is 1.5 km^{2} (0.6 mi^{2}) in area, had a population of 165 as of the 2011 census.

The area is home to a soccer club, a primary school and a golf course.

== Facilities ==
=== Primary school ===
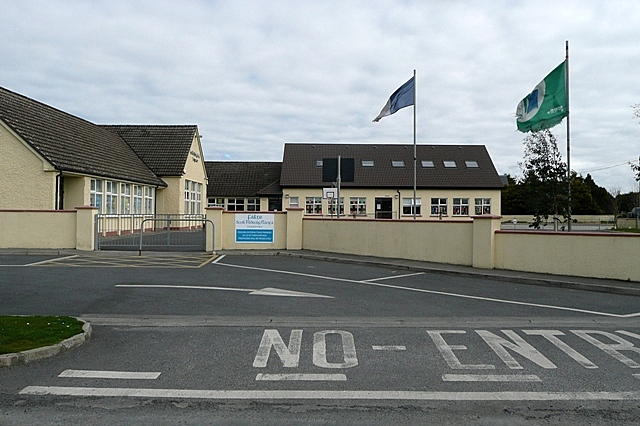
Cregmore National School

A hedge school taught the young people of Cregmore until the mid-1800s. A Mr Murphy used to gather children at an old house, and charged a penny to teach basic reading and writing skills.

In July 1933, a new school, Cregmore National School (N.S.), opened at Cregmore Cross. The school welcomed 108 pupils that first day; from the ages of three and a half to fifteen years.

The original school building was demolished in 1978, and replaced with a newer structure.

In 2010, a truck collided with several parked vehicles at the school; there were no injuries.

=== Soccer club ===
The local association football (soccer) club, Cregmore Claregalway F.C., was formed on 17 July 1996. The new club entered three underage teams in the Galway & District League. Red and black were chosen as the club colours and the emblem was designed to include a depiction of Cregmore Bridge over the River Clare.

=== Golf club ===
Cregmore Park Golf Club opened in June 2007. It is a 7,000 yard, par 72 championship course designed by Arthur Spring.

== Notable people ==
- Greg Cunningham, association footballer
- Ryan Manning, association footballer
