= Westport United F.C. =

- Full name: Westport United Football Club
- Nickname: The Covies
- Founded: 1911
- Ground: United Park; Westport, County Mayo
- League: Mayo Association Football League; Connacht Senior League
- Website: www.westportunited.com
Home colours

Westport United F.C. is an Irish association football club based in Westport, County Mayo. Founded in 1911, it is one of the oldest association football clubs in both County Mayo and Connacht. They currently play in the Mayo Association Football League. They have previously played in the Connacht Senior League. Westport United came to national prominence after winning the 2004–05 FAI Junior Cup and playing in the 2005 FAI Cup.

== History ==
=== Early years ===
Westport United was formed in 1911 and is one of the oldest association football clubs in both County Mayo and Connacht. There was an early connection with Bohemian F.C. Frank Gill, who was originally from the Quays area of Westport, was involved with both Bohemians and Westport United in the 1900s and it was through this connection that the Mayo club adopted the Bohemians red and black colours. On one occasion Harold Sloan, a leading Bohemians player and Ireland international, planted a tree in recognition of the two clubs' friendship. During its early years Westport United played in a local town based league and also entered the IFA Junior Cup. The introduction of the Connacht Junior Cup in 1928–29 increased the number of games for the club. According to some sources, the club won the Connacht Junior Cup in 1941–42, 1944–45 and 1949–50. However other sources credit these wins to Westport Town.

=== Mayo Association Football League ===
In 1954 Westport Town, Barcastle, Quay Hearts and Castlebar Celtic became the founder members of the Mayo Association Football League. Together with Castlebar Celtic, Westport United would go on to become the league's two most successful clubs. Between 1962–63 and 1969–70 Westport United won the league seven out of eight times. They also won the Connacht Junior Cup in 1960–61. The club made it to the semi-finals of the FAI Junior Cup in 1969. One of the reasons for Westport United's success during era was because they regularly borrowed players from Derry City. Sporting Club Westport was formed, partially in protest over local players being frozen out at the expense of the northerners and the new club briefly ended United's domination of the league when they became champions in 1970–71 and 1971–72. Following an objection from Galway Bohemians, the Mayo League intervened in 1972–73 and ordered Westport United to field an all-local team for that season. Between 1973–74 and 1975–76 Westport United completed a three in a row of league titles. In 1973–74 they also won the Western League and the Connacht Junior Cup. During the late 1970s and 1980s the top team from the Mayo League also played off against the winners of other Connacht junior leagues for the Michael Byrne Cup. In 1986–87 Westport United won the Byrne Cup defeating West United of the Galway & District League in the final. Three weeks earlier they also beat West United to win the Connacht Junior Cup.

=== Connacht Senior League ===
Between 1988–89 and 1994–95 Westport United's senior team played in the Connacht Senior League. It was not a particularly successful era for Westport United. Their best performance from their time in the CSL was finishing as runners-up to Salthill Devon in the 1990–91 Connacht Senior Cup.

=== FAI Junior Cup winners ===
In 2004–05 Westport United came to national prominence after winning the FAI Junior Cup and playing in the 2005 FAI Cup. In the early rounds of the former competition, Westport overcome Leeside F.C. (Cork) and Pike Rovers before knocking out Killester United in the quarter-final. In the semi-final Carew Park and Westport initially drew 1–1 before the former won 3–1 on penalties. However it later emerged that Carew Park had fielded a suspended player and the FAI ordered the tie be replayed. Westport won the rearranged fixture 1–0 and progressed to the final. The final was played at Buckley Park on 19 June 2005 and Westport defeated Waterford Crystal 2–0 to win the cup. After reaching the FAI Junior Cup semi-finals Westport United also qualified to play in the 2005 FAI Cup. However they were defeated 2–1 in the first round by Fanad United.

=== Connacht Senior Cup ===
In 2008–09 Westport United won the Connacht Senior Cup for the first time after defeating Athenry 2–1 in the final after extra time.

== Ground ==
Westport United initially played their home games at various grounds around Westport. These included Westport Demesne, Munster's Field and Coyne's Field, now known as Fr. Angelus Park. In 1947 the club began to develop a site purchased from the Marquess of Sligo. It later became known as the Westport Sports Park which was opened on 27 June 1953. The first game to take place at the Sports Park saw an Everton XI play a Johnny Carey XI. On 23 July 1983, the Sports Park was re-opened having been renovated. The new-look ground featured a running track and a concrete spectator terrace. To celebrated the occasion a Connacht XI played a Manchester United XI. In 2013 the club began developing a new site on the grounds of Westport House and it was opened on 25 September 2016 and it is called United Park. The project was partially funded by a €200,000 grant from the Irish Government. The grant was allocated by Michael Ring, Minister of State at the Department of Transport, Tourism and Sport, who also represents Mayo in Dáil Éireann. Westport United has retained the Sports Park and it is still used for some underage and adult matches.

== Notable former managers ==
- (Republic of Ireland) John Herrick

== Honours ==
- FAI Junior Cup
  - Winners: 2004–05: 1
- Mayo Association Football League
  - Winners: 1962–63, 1963–64, 1964–65, 1966–67, 1967–68, 1968–69, 1969–70, 1973–74, 1974–75, 1975–76, 1981–82, 2002, 2004, 2005, 2007, 2008, 2012, 2014, 2015, 2016, 2017: 21
  - Runners Up: 1957–58, 1959–60, 1960–61, 1970–71, 1980–81, 1982–83, 1986–87, 2009, 2010 2011: 10
- Michael Byrne Cup
  - Winners: 1986–87: 1
- Western League/Connacht Senior League
  - Winners: 1973–74: 1
  - Runners Up: 1938–39: 1
- Connacht Senior Cup
  - Winners: 2008–09: 1
  - Runners Up: 1990–91: 1
- Connacht Junior Cup
  - Winners: 1941–42, 1944–45, 1949–50, 1960–61, 1973–74, 1986–87, 2011-12: 7 (Note: Some sources credit the wins in 1941–42, 1944–45 and 1949–50 to Westport Town)
