= Mervue United A.F.C. =

Mervue United
- Full name: Mervue United; Association Football Club
- Founded: 1960
- Ground: Fahy's Field
- Manager: Brendan O'Connor
- League: FAI National League (2026–present); Galway & District League (2013–present); A Championship; League of Ireland U21 Division
- Website: mervueunitedafc.clubzap.com
Home colours	Away colours

Mervue United A.F.C. is an Irish association football club based in Mervue, Galway. As of August 2026, the club has entered men's teams in the FAI National League and the Galway & District League. The club has previously fielded teams in the Connacht Senior League, the League of Ireland U21 Division, the A Championship and the League of Ireland First Division.

== History ==
=== Early years ===
Mervue United was formed in 1960 by a group of residents in the McDonagh Avenue area of Mervue, Galway. In 1964–65 the club won its first trophy, the Murphy Cup, a competition for under–13 boys teams. By the early 1970s Mervue were playing in the Galway & District League and in 1972–73 they won promotion to the league's Premier Division. They subsequently won the competition's two league cups regularly, with three Joe Ryan Cups and five Lillis Cups in six years. In 1976–77, the club won a Galway & District League and Michael Byrne Cup double. Mervue retained the double the following season in addition to their fourth Lillis Cup in a row.

By 1979, the club's reserve team – Mervue United B – had also gained promotion to the Premier Division. However, Galway Football Association rules dictated that two teams from the same club could not play in the same division. As a result, Mervue Celtic was founded in July 1979 as a separate club. Celtic, like United before them, also found success in the Joe Ryan Cup and the Lillis Cup competitions. In 1981–82 they also won the Galway area FAI Junior Cup competition.

=== Connacht Senior League ===
Between 1981 and 2000 Mervue United played in the Connacht Senior League. In 1981–82, together with Sligo Rovers Reserves, Castlerea Celtic, Salthill Devon, Ballina Rovers, Tuam Celtic and UCG, Mervue United became founder members of the CSL. In its first season Mervue United finished as runners-up behind Sligo Rovers. They also won a league cup double, winning both the Connacht Senior League Cup and the Connacht Senior League Challenge Cup. Mervue United won the league for the first time in 1982–83 and subsequently went on to become one of the league's most successful teams, winning the title eight times. In 1982–83 and 1983–84 they completed two successive trebles winning the league title, the Challenge Cup and the Connacht Senior Cup. In 1992–93 they went one better and won a quartet of trophies, winning the league title, the Connacht Senior League Shield, Connacht Senior Cup and the Challenge Cup. Between 1996 and 1997 and 1999–2000 Mervue United were also Connacht Senior League champions four times in a row. In 1999–2000 Mervue United completed another treble by also winning the League Cup and the Challenge Cup. In 1984–85 Mervue United first came to national prominence when they became the first CSL club to take part in the FAI Cup, losing 2–1 in the first round to the holders, UCD. In the 1986–87 FAI Cup they defeated Longford Town 1–0 in the first round but got knocked out by Rockmount in the next round. In 1997–98 Mervue United made a third appearance in the FAI Cup but were knocked out in the first round after a replay by Sligo Rovers. As Connacht Senior League champions, United were also invited to play in the League of Ireland Cup.

=== National leagues ===
In 2008, together with local rivals, Salthill Devon, Mervue United were founder members of the A Championship. As the highest placed non-reserve team in the league's inaugural season, Mervue United qualified for a relegation/promotion play-off. They subsequently defeated Kildare County 5–3 on aggregate and were promoted to the League of Ireland First Division. Between 2009 and 2013 Mervue United played in the League of Ireland First Division, initially at Terryland Park before returning to Fahey's Field in 2011. In their final season they finished third before losing a relegation/promotion play-off against Longford Town.

=== Galway United ===
In 2012 an FAI commissioned report recommended that Galway city and County Galway should be represented in the League of Ireland by a single club or team based at Eamonn Deacy Park. The O'Connor Report also recommended that the Galway Football Association, the Galway United Supporters Trust, Salthill Devon and Mervue United should work together to form such a club. Following the conclusion of the 2013 season, both Mervue United and Salthill Devon withdrew from the League of Ireland First Division to make way for a reformed Galway United. The new board of Galway United featured two Mervue United representatives, Donnie Farragher and Declan McDonnell. The O'Connor Report had also recommended reforming the Connacht Senior League, allowing Mervue United and Salthill Devon to play at a provincial level. However, in June 2013 the Connacht Tribune reported that the plans for a reformed CSL were shelved due to a lack of sufficient interest from the clubs. The senior teams of Mervue United and Salthill Devon subsequently joined the Galway & District League.

=== FAI National League ===
On 19 December 2025, Mervue United were announced as one of the founding 15 clubs in the League of Ireland's new third tier, the FAI National League. In May 2026, it was reported that the club would be in Group 1 for the league's first season. On 17 June, the club announced that Brendan O'Connor would be the club's manager and director of football for the upcoming season, with their Junior manager, Ollie Neary, and former player, Paul Sinnott being on the coaching staff for their first season back in the League of Ireland.

== Squad ==
As of 29 August 2026

Note: Flags indicate national team as defined under FIFA eligibility rules; some limited exceptions apply. Players may hold more than one non-FIFA nationality.

No.	Pos.	Nation	Player
1	GK	IRL	Peter Healy
2	DF	IRL	Luke O'Gorman
3	DF	IRL	Milo O'Malley
4	DF	IRL	Liam Murray (captain)
5	DF	IRL	Ify Asogu
6	MF	IRL	Eoghan McDonagh
7	MF	IRL	Kody McCann
8	MF	IRL	Donnacha McNamara
9	FW	IRL	Gavin Smyth
10	MF	IRL	Aaron Neary
11	MF	IRL	Jason Molloy

No.	Pos.	Nation	Player
12	DF	IRL	Daniel Brennan
13	MF	IRL	Brian Tolan
14	MF	IRL	Jack Naylor
15	DF	IRL	Michael McSweeney
16	FW	IRL	Lewis Waweru
17	DF	IRL	Adam Healy
18	FW	IRL	Darragh McNamara
19	MF	IRL	Charlie Jones-Concannon
20	GK	IRL	Cian Costello
21	DF	IRL	Kacper Zatonski

== Technical staff ==
Position	Name
Manager	Brendan O'Connor
Assistant Manager	Ollie Neary
Assistant Manager	Paul Sinnott
Goalkeeping Coach	Tommy Lally

== Ground ==
Mervue United originally operated out of the Redemptorist Grounds before moving to Monivea Road were they shared facilities with Mervue Athletic Club. After joining the Connacht Senior League, the club secured a lease on a clubhouse and a pitch in Fahy's Field. This has remained the club's principal home ground ever since.

After promotion to the League of Ireland First Division, Mervue United temporarily played at Terryland Park during the 2009 and 2010 seasons as Fahy's Field did not meet League of Ireland standards. However, the move away from their Mervue fan base affected attendances to the degree that they were the lowest in league records. By early 2011, additions such as fencing and turnstiles had been made to Fahy's Field which brought the ground up to code and allowed Mervue United to return home to play games in the 2011 League of Ireland First Division season.

== Notable former players ==
Republic of Ireland international

- (Republic of Ireland) Aaron Connolly
- (Republic of Ireland) Greg Cunningham
- (Republic of Ireland) Ryan Manning

Republic of Ireland U21 internationals

- (Republic of Ireland) Baba Adeeko
- (Republic of Ireland) Séamus Conneely
- (Republic of Ireland) Conor Shaughnessy
- (Republic of Ireland) Joe Shaughnessy

Republic of Ireland U19 internationals

- (Republic of Ireland) Ger Hanley

Republic of Ireland U18 internationals

- (Republic of Ireland) Brian Cunningham
- (Republic of Ireland) Ronan Manning
- (Republic of Ireland) John Mountney

Top Goalscorers

- (Republic of Ireland) Patrick Hoban: 21 (2009–12)
- (Republic of Ireland) Rory Gaffney: 15 (2009–11)

New Zealand U20 international

- (New Zealand) Darren Young

== Honours ==
- Connacht Senior League
  - Winners: 1982–83, 1983–84, 1986–87, 1992–93, 1996–97, 1997–98, 1998–99, 1999–2000: 8
  - Runners-up: 1981–82, 1984–85: 2
- Connacht Senior Cup
  - Winners: 1982–83, 1983–84, 1992–93, 1994–95, 1997–98, 1999–2000: 6
  - Runners-up: 1986–87, 1987–88, 1988–89, 1998–99, 2007–08: 5
- Connacht Senior League Challenge Cup
  - Winners: 1981–82, 1982–83, 1983–84, 1984–85, 1988–89, 1992–93: 6
  - Runners-up: 1985–86: 1
- Connacht Senior League Cup/Shield
  - Winners: 1981–82, 1992–93, 1999–2000: 3
- Connacht Junior Cup
  - Winners: 1989–90, 1990–91, 1997–98, 2001–02, 2004–05, 2014–15, 2017–18: 7
  - Runners-up: 1979–80, 1984–85: 2
- Galway & District League
  - Winners: 1976–77, 1986–87, 1988–89, 1989–90, 2001–02, 2002–03, 2003–04, 2004–05, 2010–11, 2011–12, 2012–13, 2018–19: 12
- Michael Byrne Cup
  - Winners: 1976–77, 1977–78, 2001–02, 2002–03, 2003–04, 2004–05, 2005–06, 2009–10, 2010–11, 2018–19: 10
  - Runners-up: 2006–07, 2012–13: 2
