= David Forde (footballer) =

Irish footballer (born 1979)

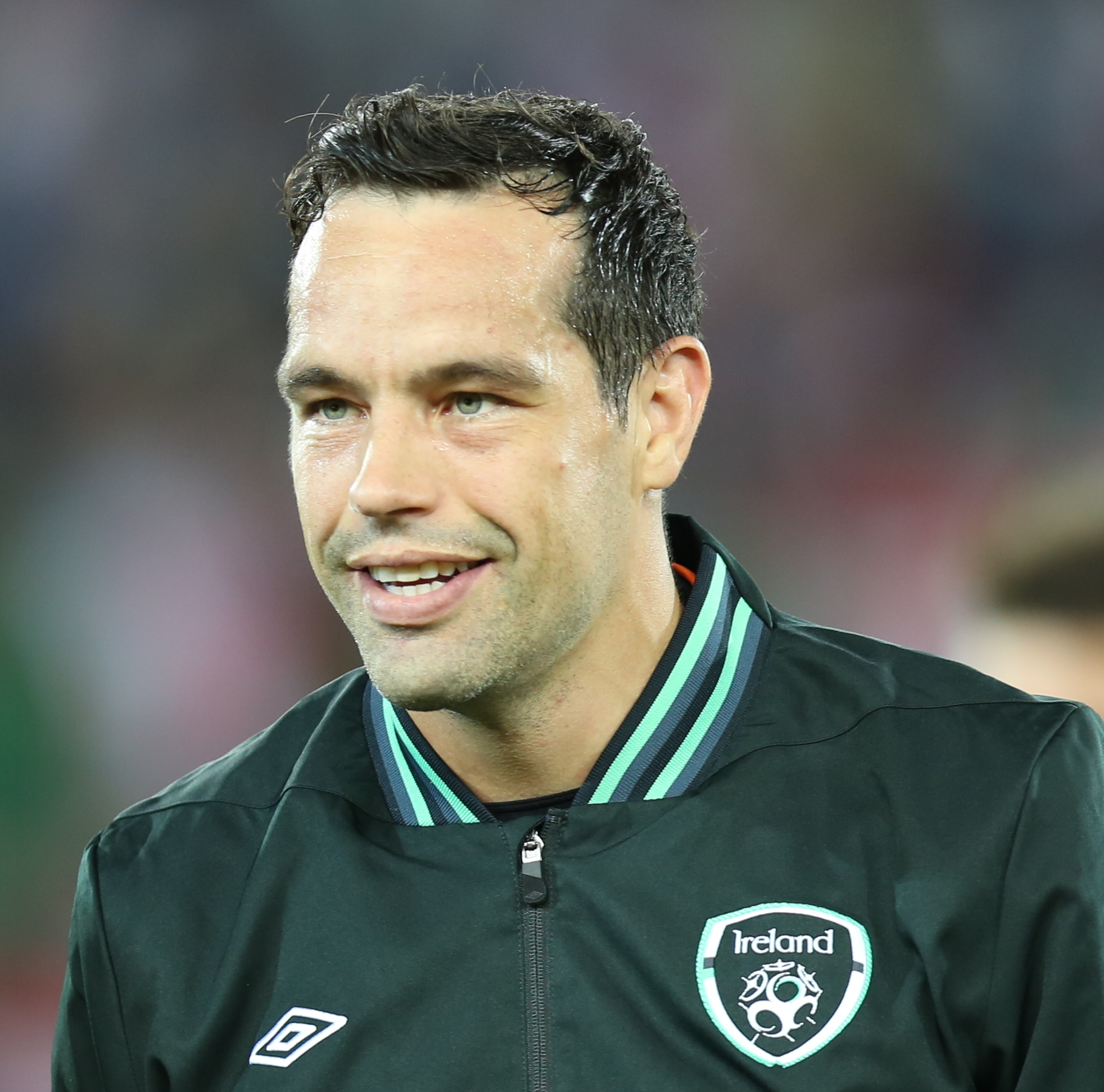
- Forde lining up for the Republic of Ireland in 2013

Personal information
- Full name: David Forde
- Date of birth: 20 December 1979 (age 46)
- Place of birth: Galway, Ireland
- Height: 1.90 m (6 ft 3 in)
- Position: Goalkeeper

Youth career
- Newcastle United
- Galway Hibernians
- 1996: Belvedere

Senior career*
Years	Team	Apps	(Gls)
1999–2001	Galway United	38	(0)
2001–2002	Barry Town	16	(0)
2002–2004	West Ham United	0	(0)
2003	→ Derry City (loan)		
2003	→ Barnet (loan)	7	(0)
2004	Galway United		
2005–2006	Derry City	63	(0)
2006–2008	Cardiff City	7	(0)
2007	→ Luton Town (loan)	5	(0)
2008	→ AFC Bournemouth (loan)	11	(0)
2008–2017	Millwall	299	(0)
2016–2017	→ Portsmouth (loan)	46	(0)
2017–2019	Cambridge United	43	(0)
Total		535+	(0)

International career
2011–2016	Republic of Ireland	24	(0)
- * Club domestic league appearances and goals

David Forde (born 20 December 1979) is an Irish former professional footballer who played as a goalkeeper. Internationally, Forde played for the Republic of Ireland between 2011 and 2016 and was part of the team's 23-man squad for the 2012 European Championships. In 2013, he became the oldest player to make their competitive debut for the Republic of Ireland, when he played against Sweden at the age of 33.

Forde started his career with his hometown club Galway United in 1999. After two seasons with Galway, he moved to Welsh League Champions Barry Town and from there to West Ham United. Forde failed to make a first team appearance for West Ham, and after loan spells with Derry City and Barnet he returned to Ireland on a permanent basis, playing with Galway United and then Derry City. In 2007 Forde returned to the English leagues, joining Championship side Cardiff City. During his time with Cardiff, Forde made loan moves to Luton Town and AFC Bournemouth. In 2008, he moved to Millwall, for whom he has made more professional appearances than all his previous clubs together. In 2016, after eight seasons with Millwall, Forde went out on loan to Portsmouth in League Two. In 2017 Forde joined Cambridge United and retired after being released by them two years later.

== Early life ==
Born in Galway, Forde grew up in the west side of the city. He received his primary education at St. Patrick's Boys' School in the city and his secondary education from St. Joseph's Patrician College.

Forde played football for local underage sides in Galway in his youth, representing Newcastle United and Galway Hibernians. He was scouted by Dublin-based club, Belvedere and played for their youth teams.

== Club career ==
=== Early career ===
Forde made his League of Ireland debut for his hometown side Galway United at Terryland Park on 3 September 1999. His form led to a move to Welsh side Barry Town. Here, he continued to show his potential as an excellent shot stopper, playing in sixteen league matches for the club, and in February 2002, he joined West Ham United for a fee of £75,000. Forde initially had a trial at Upton Park before earning a professional contract. He was recommended to the 'Hammers' by Barry Town boss Kenny Brown, a former West Ham player.

Initially, Forde had ambitions of "looking to make the first team" at a time when David James was firmly established as England's World Cup number one, however, the signing of Raimond van der Gouw in the summer of 2002 pushed him further down the pecking order.

At the start of the 2002/2003 season, manager Glenn Roeder made Forde available for loan and it was then when Forde first joined Derry City. After spending the season on loan at The Brandywell, Forde moved back to his hometown and signed for League of Ireland First Division side Galway United.

It was at Galway that Forde built a fine reputation in Irish football circles and his form earned him a permanent move back to Derry City for the 2005 season. During this season and the next, he was ever present for 'City', consistently producing excellent performances and helping them to a second-place finish in the League of Ireland Premier Division on both occasions.

Forde also played in all six games (and registered three clean sheets) during the Candystripes' run to the first round proper of the UEFA Cup, and helped the club win the 2006 FAI Cup.

=== Cardiff City ===
On 5 December 2006, it was announced that Forde had signed a one-and-a-half-year contract with Football League Championship side Cardiff City following the expiry of his contract with Derry City. He stated that the move back to Wales, where he began his cross-channel career, was "a dream come true". He joined the club and hoped to challenge Neil Alexander for the number one spot immediately, with an international spot surely not too far away. Even after he left Derry City for Cardiff City his contributions during the 2006 season were recognised by eircom and the Soccer Writers Association of Ireland who, together, nominated him for their 'Goalkeeper of the Year' award on 13 December. Forde made several appearances for Cardiff at the end of the 2006/07 season after first choice Neil Alexander was dropped due to a contract dispute with the club. With Alexander leaving the club he was expected to battle for the number 1 shirt with Michael Oakes and Ross Turnbull.

In August 2007 Forde signed a one-month loan deal at Luton Town and returned to Cardiff having made six first team appearances, five in the league and one in the League Cup, for the club. He found himself to be third choice goalkeeper at Cardiff during the 2007/08 season behind Michael Oakes and loanees Ross Turnbull, Kasper Schmeichel and Peter Enckelman. On 22 January he was due to sign on an emergency loan deal at AFC Bournemouth but was told on his way to his first match that Bournemouth had been placed under a transfer block after attempting to enter administration and the deal had been cancelled. He drove back to Cardiff and instead played in their 1–0 win over Welshpool Town in the FAW Premier Cup.

On 31 January he was set to join Scottish Premier League side Dundee United on loan but the move was blocked by the Scottish Football Association because players are not allowed to play in three countries in one season, Forde having played for Luton and in the FAW Premier Cup, but the decision was appealed by Dundee United but was eventually denied by FIFA. He eventually signed for Bournemouth on a one-week emergency loan after the club were granted permission to sign him, making his debut on 8 March against Leeds United and playing against Oldham Athletic three days later, both matches ending in a 2–0 defeat. His loan spell was extended by another week before the clubs eventually agreed for it to run until the end of the season on 27 March. He made a total of 11 appearances for the club before returning to Cardiff, where he was released on his return.

=== Millwall ===
On 5 June 2008, he signed a two-year deal at League One side Millwall, making his debut for the club on the opening day of the season in a 4–3 defeat to Oldham Athletic. On 30 August 2008, in his fifth game for the club, Forde saved a dramatic last-minute David Unsworth penalty which saw Millwall pick up their first home win of the campaign as they beat Huddersfield Town 2–1. Forde also saved a penalty from Jermaine Beckford in the semi-final of the League one play off, which guided his team through to the final. He played at Wembley Stadium in successive years in the 2009 Football League One play-off final and the 2010 Football League One play-off final being successful in the latter.

Following his Millwall League debut he played all 49 league games for the club in the 2008–09 season (46 regular games, two play-off semi-finals and the Final). Uniquely, he did exactly the same thing the following season—and made his 100th Millwall league appearance on 14 August 2010—two years and five days after his first.

==== Loan to Portsmouth ====
On 28 July 2016, it was announced that Forde would join Portsmouth on a season-long loan.

=== Cambridge United ===
On 20 July 2017, Forde signed a one-year deal with League Two club Cambridge United.

Forde was released by Cambridge United at the end of the 2018–19 season and announced his retirement on 6 August 2019.

== International career ==
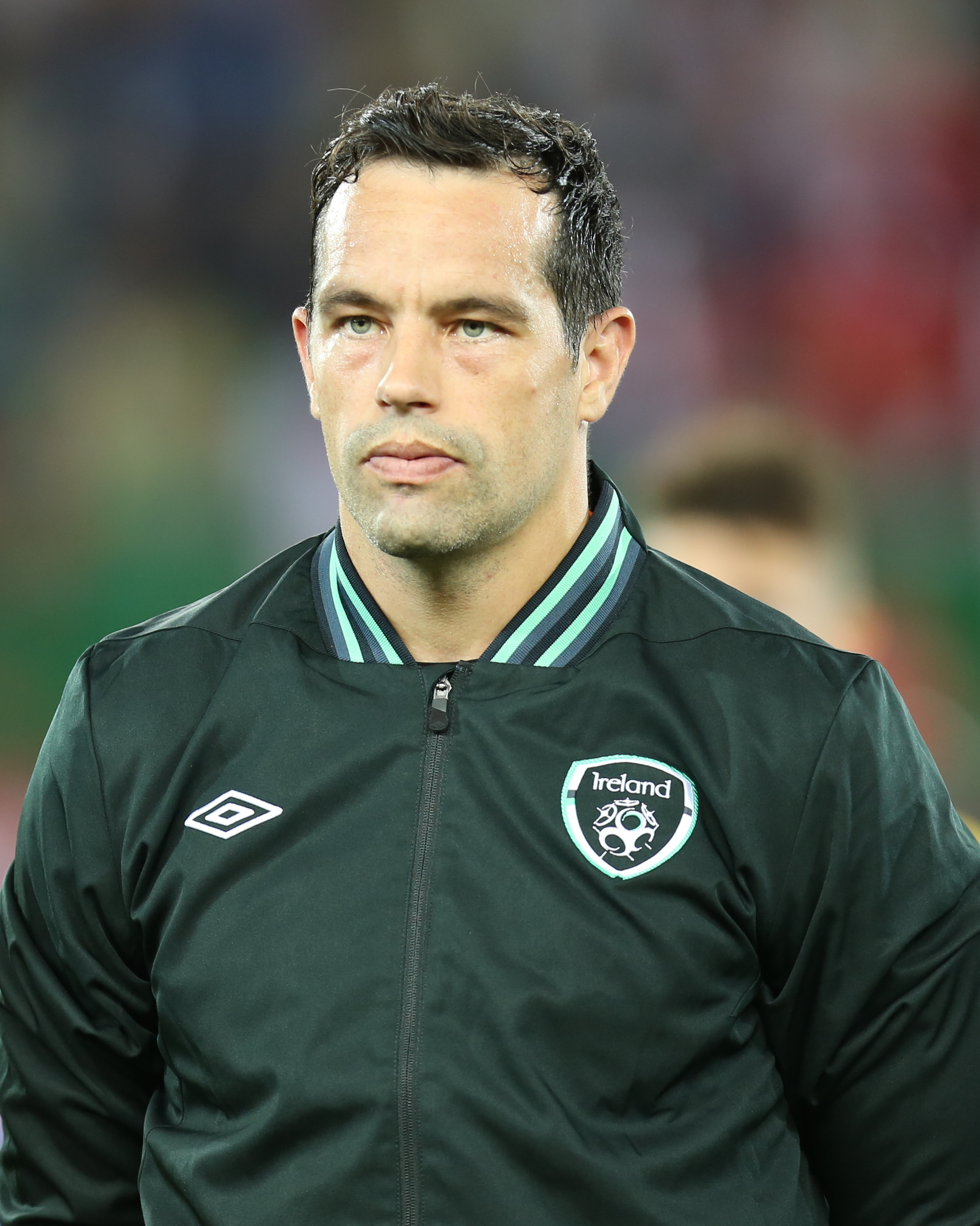
Forde lining up for the Republic of Ireland in 2013

Contrary to certain stories, Forde is not a Welsh former under-21 international. Forde stated, "I'm not sure where that came from, but it's wrong," continuing, "That story started a long time ago when I played for Barry Town and seems to have stuck. I even read that I have a Welsh grandmother, but that's not right. Don't get me wrong because I love it here in Wales, but I am only qualified to play for the Republic of Ireland."

Forde was called up to the Republic of Ireland squad for the first time on 13 March 2011, after impressing manager Giovanni Trapattoni by keeping 20 clean sheets (out of 46) in Millwall's first season back in the Football League Championship. Ireland played Macedonia and Uruguay although he remained on the bench for both games.

On 24 May 2011, Forde made his Republic of Ireland debut against Northern Ireland, coming on as a substitute for the last 20 minutes of the game which Ireland won 5–0.

He played his debut for Ireland on 7 June 2011 in a friendly international against Italy, conceding no goals. He played in another friendly international against Greece on 14 November 2012 and conceded the only goal of the match.

He was selected by Ireland for the UEFA Euro 2012 tournament, alongside Keiren Westwood and Shay Given, however it was the latter who played all the matches. With Given's retirement after the tournament, Westwood briefly took over. But when Westwood stopped being played by his club, Giovanni Trapattoni decided to give Forde a chance in a friendly against Poland. On 6 February 2013, based on Forde's performance in this match which was won 2–0 by Ireland, Trapattoni announced Forde would be Ireland's first-choice goalkeeper.

On 22 March 2013, aged 33, Forde became the oldest player to make his competitive debut for Ireland against Sweden in a World Cup qualifier. Ireland kept a clean sheet with Forde's impressive performance helping Ireland to an away point. Forde started Ireland's next match against Austria the following week and despite conceding two goals he put in a solid performance. On 7 June 2013, Forde made his ninth appearance for Ireland in a 3–0 over the Faroe Islands at the Aviva Stadium. In a surprising turn of events, Forde made his return to the Irish squad, against Sweden, in a 2014 World Cup qualifier, on 6 September 2013, at the Aviva Stadium in a 1–2 defeat, having been an injury doubt.

Forde continued as number one under the new management of Martin O'Neill and assistant Roy Keane despite Shay Given returning to the fold starting Ireland's first UEFA Euro 2016 qualifying game against Georgia. Ireland won 2–1 thanks to a late goal by Aiden McGeady. On 14 October 2014, Forde started in the memorable 1–1 draw with Germany. He made an important save from Mario Götze to keep the game at 1–0, which proved crucial as Ireland equalized late on thanks to John O'Shea to earn a point in Gelsenkirchen.

Despite having started UEFA Euro 2016 qualifying as Ireland's first choice goalkeeper, Forde was not among the three goalkeepers selected for UEFA Euro 2016 when Ireland qualified; he lost out to Given, Westwood and Darren Randolph, who started every game at the tournament and soon established himself as Ireland's number one goalkeeper. On 31 May that year, Ireland's final game before the squad announcement occurred at Turner's Cross. After the hour, manager Martin O'Neill told Forde to prepare to play, prompting Westwood, the other goalkeeper on the bench, to remark: "Well, that's not me going now" [to Euro 2016]. Forde later said he felt Westwood's instincts were incorrect and his own sense that he would be overlooked was confirmed shortly after the game when O'Neill brought him aside. Forde later said: "Once the manager called me into the room and told me it was a lonely space. It was a difficult thing to take. Over the last two years, my goal was to go to the Euros, and I had started the campaign.... it was bitterly disappointing". Even so, while leaving Turner's Cross, Forde paused to sign each autograph request – all the while knowing his international career was over. This "remarkable response" was by no means a certainty within the Irish squad, even among those whose continued presence was assured; a nephew of Forde's who had previously requested an autograph from another Ireland footballer in the player's lounge following a match was snubbed.

=== International Caps ===
Republic of Ireland national team
Year	Apps	Goals
2011	2	0
2012	2	0
2013	11	0
2014	8	0
2016	1	0
Total	24	0

== Taming the Lion ==
A documentary, Taming the Lion, focuses on the career of David Forde.

== Personal life ==
Forde practises the ancient art of Japa.

== Honours ==
Derry City

- FAI Cup: 2006
- League of Ireland Cup: 2006

Millwall

- Football League One play-offs: 2010

Portsmouth

- EFL League Two: 2016–17

Republic of Ireland

- Nations Cup: 2011
