= Castlebar Celtic F.C. =

Irish association football club

- Full name: Castlebar Celtic Football Club
- Founded: 1924
- Ground: Celtic Park, Castlebar, County Mayo
- Capacity: 1,500
- Chairman: Joe Mc Donald
- League: Mayo Association Football League; League of Ireland U20 Division; A Championship; Connacht Senior League
- Website: www.castlebarceltic.com
Home colours	Away colours

Castlebar Celtic F.C. (Irish: Cumann Peile Caisleán an Bharraigh Ceiltigh) is an Irish association football club based in Castlebar, County Mayo. They currently play in the Mayo Association Football League. They have previously fielded teams in the League of Ireland U20 Division, the A Championship and the Connacht Senior League. The club previously operated a women's team.

== History ==
=== Early years ===
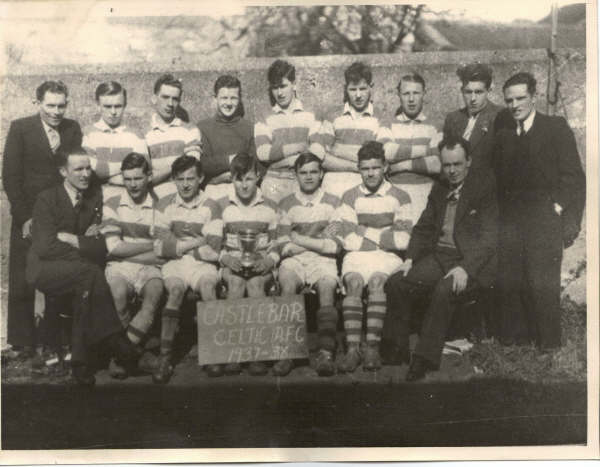
The Castlebar Celtic team that won the 1937–38 Alfie Byrne Cup, the club's first trophy

According to the club crest, Castlebar Celtic was founded in 1924. However, during the club's early years there was little activity. The club was reformed in 1928 as Castlebar Corinthians and did not become Castlebar Celtic until 1932. The name change was partly inspired by Celtic F.C. Initially the club played only friendlies as there were no local competitions for the club to enter. One of the earliest of these friendlies in 1928 saw Westport United visit Castlebar Celtic and win 4–1. In 1937–38 an under–18 team won the club's first trophy, the Alfie Byrne Cup. This cup was awarded to the winners of a town league based in Westport. During the 1940s Castlebar Celtic began to compete in provincial competitions such as the Western League and the Connacht Junior Cup. They won their first major honour in 1946–47 when they won the latter competition.

=== Mayo Association Football League ===
In 1954, together with Westport Town, Barcastle and Quay Hearts, Castlebar Celtic became founder members of the Mayo Association Football League. They finished the inaugural season as champions and together with Westport United, Castlebar Celtic became one of the league's two most successful clubs. Between 1957–58 and 1961–62 they were league champions five times in a row. In 1967–68 a Castlebar Celtic A team were champions while a Castlebar Celtic B team finished as runners up. Between 1980–81 and 1986–87 they completed another five in a row. After winning the league title in 1978–79 and 1980–81, Castlebar Celtic also went on to win the Michael Byrne Cup.

=== Connacht Senior League ===
In 1987–88 Castlebar Celtic joined the Connacht Senior League and in their first season finished as runners up behind Galway United Reserves. In 1988–89 they went one better when they finished as champions. Castlebar Celtic clinched the title after a draw in their final game with second placed Salthill Devon. The game was rescheduled after an assault on the referee by a Salthill Devon fan caused the original fixture to be abandoned with Celtic leading 1–0.

In 1997, the club setup a youth academy for their players. Castlebar Celtic continued to play in the Connacht Senior League until 1999–2000 when the league was dissolved. Although Celtic did not win the league title again, they were runners up on two further occasions and they did win both the Connacht Senior League Incentive Cup and the Connacht Senior League Challenge Cup. In 1992–93 Castlebar Celtic also represented the Connacht Senior League in the League of Ireland Cup after finishing second behind Sligo Rovers Reserves in the 1991–92 season. Castlebar Celtic were invited to participate because reserve teams were ineligible to compete in the League of Ireland Cup.

=== A Championship ===
After featuring in the 2007 League of Ireland U20 Division, Castlebar Celtic became the first club from County Mayo to play in a national league. They qualified for the 2008 FAI Cup and subsequently joined the A Championship in 2009. The club was encouraged to make the move from provincial to national level after winning the 2006–07 FAI Youth Cup. Their 2009 A Championship squad included eight members of the cup winning team. However, with the conclusion of the 2010 season, Celtic withdrew from the league.

== Ground ==
Castlebar Celtic originally played their home games at Fairgreen and later played at Niland's Field. In 1954 the club purchased Celtic Park, their current home, which was then known as Flannelly's Field.

== Honours ==
- FAI Youth Cup
  - Winners: 2006–07: 1
- Mayo Association Football League
  - Winners: 1954, 1957–58, 1958–59, 1959–60, 1960–61, 1961–62, 1967–68, 1978–79, 1980–81, 1982–83, 1983–84, 1984–85, 1985–86, 1986–87, 2001, 2006, 2011, 2019, 2023, 2024, 2025: 21
  - Runners Up: 1962–63, 1963–64, 1964–65, 1965–66, 1967–68, 1968–69, 1971–72, 1976–77, 1977–78, 1981–82, 2003, 2004, 2012, 2014: 14
- Western League/Connacht Senior League
  - Winners: 1988–89: 1
  - Runners Up: 1947–48, 1970–71, 1987–88, 1991–92, 1994–95: 5
- Connacht Senior Cup
  - Runners Up: 1984–85: 1
- Connacht Senior League Challenge Cup
  - Winners: 1997–98: 1
  - Runners Up: 1987–88, 1991–92, 1998–99: 3
- Connacht Senior League Incentive Cup
  - Winners: 1989–90: 1
- Connacht Junior Cup
  - Winners: 1946–47, 1954–55, 1958–59, 1959–60, 1963–64, 1979–80, 1984–85, 1985–86, 2002–03: 9
- Michael Byrne Cup
  - Winners: 1978–79, 1980–81: 2
