= Colga of Kilcolgan =

Colga of Kilcolgan, Irish saint, fl. c. 600.

Colga was the founder of the first Christian settlement at Kilcolgan, County Galway. He would have been contemporary with Colman mac Duagh and Surney of Drumacoo. His sister, Feilis, also founded a Christian settlement in the area.

According to genealogies, Colga and Feilis were of the progeny of Aodh mac Lughaidh mac Nath Í. This would make him a kinsman of the Uí Fiachrach Aidhne dynasty, and its rulers such as Guaire Aidne mac Colmáin.

== See also ==
- Colga FC
