= Michael Byrne Cup =

- Organiser(s): Galway & District League; Connacht Football Association
- Founded: 1976
- Region: Galway; Connacht
- Most championships: Mervue United (9) ?

The Michael Byrne Cup is an association football cup competition featuring teams from the Galway & District League. It is now the main league cup competition for this league. However, when it was originally inaugurated in 1976–77, it was a play-off featuring the top teams from the four junior leagues affiliated to the Connacht Football Association. These are the Galway & District League, the Sligo-Leitrim League, the Mayo Association Football League and the Roscommon & District League. The winners were recognised as the Connacht junior champions and the cup was also referred to as the Connacht Champions Cup.

== List of winners ==
Season	Winner	Score	Runners-up	Venue
2025–26	Maree Oranmore FC	6 - 5	Salthill Devon	Eamonn Deacy Park
2016–17	Athenry F.C.	3 - 1	Salthill Devon	Eamonn Deacy Park
2015–16				
2014–15	Salthill Devon	0–0 (Note: Salthill Devon won 2–0 on penalties)	Corrib Rangers	Eamonn Deacy Park
2013–14	NUI Galway	2–1	Galway Hibernians	Eamonn Deacy Park
2012–13	Corrib Rangers		Mervue United	
2011–12	Athenry F.C.	3–1	East United	Eamonn Deacy Park
2010–11	Mervue United	2–1	Athenry F.C.	Terryland Park
2009–10	Mervue United	3–2	Corrib Rangers	Terryland Park
2008–09				
2007–08	St. Bernards F.C.			
2006–07	Athenry F.C.	4–0	Mervue United	Terryland Park
2005–06	Mervue United			
2004–05	Mervue United			
2003–04	Mervue United			
2002–03	Mervue United			
2001–02	Mervue United			
1996–97	Renmore A.F.C.		Calry Bohemians (Sligo)	McSharry Park, Sligo
1986–87	Westport United		West United (Galway)	
1980–81	Castlebar Celtic			
1979–80				
1978–79	Castlebar Celtic			
1977–78	Mervue United			
1976–77	Mervue United	(Note: Mervue United won after penalties)	Balla (Mayo)	Terryland Park
