= Connacht Junior Cup (association football) =

- Organiser(s): Connacht Football Association
- Founded: 1928
- Region: Connacht
- Current champions: Castlebar Celtic
- Most championships: Castlebar Celtic (11); Galway Bohemians (9)
- Website: www.connachtfa.com

The Connacht Junior Cup or Connaught Junior Cup is a cup competition organised by the Connacht Football Association for junior association football clubs. In the seasons when there has been no active Connacht Senior League or Connacht Senior Cup, this junior cup competition has effectively been the top level competition for non-League of Ireland clubs affiliated to the CFA. As a result, it is often simply just referred to as the Connacht Cup or Connaught Cup.

The inaugural winners were Galway Town. The competition's most successful clubs have been Castlebar Celtic, who have won the competition on eleven occasions, and Galway Bohemians who have been winners at least nine times. Sligo Rovers, Longford Town, Galway Rovers and Mervue United were all winners before going on to join the League of Ireland.

== List of finals ==
Date	Winner	Score	Runners-up	Venue
2024–25	Castlebar Celtic	1–0	Mervue United	Moyne Villa, Headford
2023–24	Castlebar Celtic	2–1	Maree Oranmore	Leecarrow, Roscommon
2022–23	Athenry	5–4 PENS (Note: Score was 0–0 after extra time. Athenry won the penalty shoot-out 5–4.)	Castlebar Celtic	Solar 21 Park, Castlebar
2019–20	Salthill Devon	2–1	Westport United	Milebush Park, Castlebar
2018–19	Corrib Rangers	1–0	Manulla	Eamonn Deacy Park
2017–18	Mervue United	5–4 PENS	Carbury FC	The Showgrounds
2016–17	Ballinasloe Town	3–2	West United	Eamonn Deacy Park
2015–16	Athenry	7–0	Ballinasloe Town	Lecarrow
2014–15	Mervue United	2–1	Athenry	Eamonn Deacy Park
2013–14	Ballinasloe Town	0–0 (Note: Ballinasloe Town won 4–2 on penalties)	Castlebar Celtic	Milebush Park, Castlebar
2012–13	Ballinasloe Town		Athenry	
2011–12	Westport United			
2010–11	Athenry			
2009–10	Athenry			
2008–09	Castlerea Celtic			
2007–08	Athenry			
2006–07	Athenry			
2005–06	Abbey United		Castlebar Celtic	
2004–05	Mervue United	4–1	Glenview Stars	
2003–04	Ballinasloe Town	2–1	Manulla	
2002–03	Castlebar Celtic		Moyne Villa	
2001–02	Mervue United			
2000–01	Galway Hibernians	2–1	Skyvalley	
1999–2000	Galway Hibernians	4–2	Charlestown Athletic	
1998–99	Strand Celtic		Ballyglass	
1997–98	Mervue United	2-1 (AET)	Crescent United	
1996–97	Galway Bohemians		Cliffoney Celtic	
1995–96	Calry Bohemians	1–0	Ballyglass	
1994–95	Galway Hibernians			
1993–94	Galway Hibernians	2–0	Abbey United	
1992–93	Galway Bohemians			
1991–92	Crescent United	1–0	Urlaur United	
1990–91	Mervue United			
1989–90	Mervue United			
1988–89	Castlebar Town	4–0	Calry Bohemians	
1987–88	Sligo Corinthians			
1986–87	Westport United	2–1	West United	
1985–86	Castlebar Celtic	2–1	Galway Hibernians	
1984–85	Castlebar Celtic	3–2	Mervue United	
1983–84	Sligo Collegians			
1982–83	Galway Hibernians			
1981–82	West United			
1980–81	Coolera Rovers			
1979–80	Castlebar Celtic		Mervue United	
1978–79	UCG			
1977–78	Galway Bohemians			
1976–77	Ballina Town	2–1	Galway Descpo	
1975–76	UCG		West United	
1974–75	West United	5–1	Westport	
1973–74	Westport United	1–0	OLBC (Galway)	Westport Sports Park
1972–73	UCG	2–0	Ballina Town	
1971–72	Galway Bohemians			
1970–71	Gilooly Rangers			
1969–70	Galway Bohemians			
1968–69	collegians			
1967–68	Collegians			
1966–67	UCG	1–0	Sligo Collegians	
1965–66	Shannon (Sligo)			
1964–65	UCG			
1963–64	Castlebar Celtic	5–2	Westport United	
1962–63	OLBC (Galway)			
1961–62	Collegians			
1960–61	Westport United	4–1	Sligo Rangers	
1959–60	Castlebar Celtic	3–0	OLBC (Galway)	
1958–59	Castlebar Celtic	2–1	Sligo Collegians	
1957–58	Galway Rovers			
1956–57	Shamrock Athletic		Sligo St. Annes	
1955–56	Galway Bohemians			
1954–55	Castlebar Celtic			
1953–54	Sligo Bohemians			
1952–53	Galway Bohemians			
1951–52	(Note: The list of Connaught Junior Cup Past Finals at foot.ie lists Galway Bohemians and Killybegs as winners and runners up respectively)			
1950–51	Galway Hibernians			
1949–50	Westport Town			
1948–49	Sligo Bohemians			
1947–48	M.C.R. Sligo		Castlebar Celtic	
1946–47	Castlebar Celtic	1–0	Galway Rovers	Maryland
1945–46	Galway Bohemians			
1944–45	Westport Town			
1943–44	Galway Bohemians			
1942–43	Sligo Bohemians			
1941–42	Westport Town	3–2	Galway Bohemians	
1940–41	St Mary's (Sligo)			
1939–40	Killybegs			
1938–39	Galway Bohemians			
1937–38	Galway Bohemians			
1936–37	Distillery F.C. (Sligo)			
1935–36	Sligo Bohemians			
1934–35	Sligo Bohemians			
1933–34	Killybegs	5–4	Galway	
1932–33	Glen Celtic AFC			
1931–32	Longford Town			
1930–31	Hibernians (Athlone)	5–1 (Note: This was a second replay. Two earlier games both finished 1–1)	Galway	
1929–30	Sligo Rovers			
1928–29	Galway Town	1–1 (Note: The game finished 1–1 and Hibernians (Athlone) refused to play extra time. Galway Town were awarded cup following a meeting of the Connacht Football Association)	Hibernians (Athlone)	Sligo
