= Football Association of Ireland, Women's =

Governing body for women's soccer in Ireland, affiliated to the FAI

- Abbreviation: FAI Women's
- Formation: 1973
- Region served: Ireland
- Chairperson: Frances Smith
- Vice Chair: Sean Brodie
- Secretary: Pauline O'Shaughnessy
- Parent organisation: Football Association of Ireland
- Website: www.fai.ie
- Formerly called: Ladies Football Association of Ireland, Women's Football Association of Ireland

Football Association of Ireland, Women's (FAI Women's) (formerly the Women's Football Association of Ireland) is the governing body for women's association football in Ireland. It is responsible for organising the Republic of Ireland women's national football team, the FAI Women's Cup and the Women's National League as well as various county and regional leagues and junior cup competitions.

== History ==
The WFAI was originally formed in 1973 as the Ladies Football Association of Ireland. It was initially independent of the Football Association of Ireland. In 1991 the LFAI became affiliated to the FAI and in 2001 it adopted the name Women's Football Association of Ireland. As part of the 2015-2018 FAI Women’s Strategic Plan, there was implementation of a new governance structure for women’s association football in Ireland. This saw the Women's Football Association of Ireland fully integrate into the FAI and the formation of a national Women's Football Committee as a key FAI Committee. Eight Women’s Regional Football Committees were also introduced, each made up of stakeholders from all strands of the game within their defined geographical area. These committees oversee the development of women's and girls' football in their areas, in line with the FAI Strategic Plan for Women's Football.

== Affiliated leagues ==
- Women's National League
- Dublin Women's Soccer League
- Mayo Women's Football League
- Metropolitan Girls League

== Cup competitions ==
- FAI Women's Cup

== See also ==
- Irish Universities Football Union
- Connacht Football Association
- Munster Football Association
- Leinster Football Association
- Galway Football Association
