= Tuam Celtic A.F.C. =

Tuam Celtic
- Full name: Tuam Celtic; Association Football Club
- Nicknames: The Hoops; Celtic
- Founded: 18 February 1974; 51 years ago
- Ground: Celtic Park; Cloonthue; Tuam
- League: Galway & District League
- Website: tuamceltic.ie
Home colours	Away colours

Tuam Celtic Association Football Club is an Irish association football club based in Tuam, County Galway. Their senior men's team currently competes in the Galway & District League. The club also operates a ladies team, thirteen underage teams and, as of July 2021, have approximately 450 playing members.

== History ==
After the demise of Tuam Town F.C. in 1973, a group of players who played at the old racecourse in Parkmore convened for a meeting with the idea of forming a new club.

The meeting was held in Tuam C.B.S (now St. Patrick's College) on Monday, 18 February 1974 to found a new club. The name 'Tuam Celtic A.F.C.' was adopted at this meeting after a proposal by club secretary Seamus Sweeney. Initially, a fee of 25 pence was set for membership cards to be sold to players and supporters. Registered players had to pay £1 with a fee of 10 pence per week. Tommy Fleming was elected the first team captain on 4 March 1974. Tuam Celtic played their first match against Mountbellew the following Sunday, 10 March 1974, losing 0-2.

By 1975, the club had entered a team in the Galway & District League, with Brian Carty scoring the first competitive goal for Celtic against a Salthill Devon team. Although the club initially trained at Parkmore racecourse, they did not own a playing field with Tuam Rugby Club and College Field serving as temporary homes. During a meeting held on 1 October 1975, it was proposed that a board of trustees would be formed and each would invest £1,000 over two years in the Tuam Celtic Development Fund. Grounds were eventually purchased in 1988 at Cloonthue Road which became the club's permanent home.

The club was invited to join the Connacht Senior League and became a founding member of the competition, participating in the inaugural 1981–82 season. Despite struggling in their first season, Celtic improved in their second and beat UCG to win the inaugural Incentive Cup final in 1982–83. Throughout the remainder of the decade, Celtic struggled towards the bottom of the league table. Despite further appearances in the Incentive Cup, they pulled out of the Connacht Senior League after finishing last in 1989–90. However, Celtic had continued to enter a team in the Galway & District League and this Tuam Celtic team achieved a double the same season, winning the Division 3 Cup and promotion to Division 2.

In 2010, Tuam Celtic won the Jack Lillis Cup with a 3-1 win over OLBC (Our Lady's Boys Club). The following season they finished second in the Division 2 league and gained promotion to Division 1.

In 2013, Tuam Celtic were promoted to the Premier League of the Galway & District League for the first time since 1991 after a hugely successful season where they finished second in Division 1. Celtic were just pipped to top spot on the final day of the season by Caherlistrane team, St. Patrick’s FC.

== Ground ==
Tuam Celtic play their home games at Celtic Park, just off Cloonthue Road, in Tuam.

In 1996, the club added floodlights and built dressing rooms at Cloonthue. The grounds, training pitches and facilities are wholly owned by the club, a testament to many years of voluntary fund raising by club members.

As of April 2022, the club have three full size grass pitches and a half size AstroTurf pitch which is used for training.

== Youth Structure ==
The club started an underage academy for 5 to 11 year olds in 2007 and by 2017 had 220 players. By 2022, the academy was fielding two teams at every age level.

== Notable former players ==
PFAI Players' Player of the Year

- (Republic of Ireland) Rory Gaffney
