= Dynamo Blues F.C. =

Dynamo Blues
- Full name: Dynamo Blues Football Club
- Nickname: The Blues
- Founded: 1978
- Ground: An Tuairín; Dublin Road; Tuam
- League: Galway & District League
- Website: https://dynamobluesfc.com/
Home colours

Dynamo Blues F.C. is an Irish association football club based in Tuam, County Galway. The club have two adult teams competing in the Galway & District League, and formerly ran a women's side which was started in 2021. The Ladies team reached the Galway FA Championship Cup Final in only their first season in 2022.

Founded in 1978, they remain the only club from Tuam and the surrounding areas to have won the Galway & District League Premier Division. Winning the 1984–85 Galway League qualified the club for the provincial intermediate cup competition, the Connacht Senior Cup. Despite being one of the four junior sides to participate, Dynamo Blues made it to the final where they beat UCG 2–1 to win the trophy.

== Ground ==
The club are based at An Tuairín, by the Dublin Road in Parkmore, Tuam but play their home games at College Field on the Athenry Road.

Their home ground consists of 2 full size pitches, a training pitch and a clubhouse.

The new pitch was completed in April 2022, with the first game taking place on 10 April against C.S. Chois Fharraige. The home side were victorious, winning 3–2.

== Honours ==
- Connacht Senior Cup
  - Winners: 1985–86
- Galway & District League
  - Winners: 1981–82, 1984–85: 2
