= Salthill Devon F.C. =

- Full name: Salthill Devon Football Club
- Founded: 1947; 79 years ago (as Salthill Crusaders)
- Ground: Drom Soccer Park
- Capacity: 2,000
- Manager: Greg Cunningham
- League: FAI National League Galway & District League; League of Ireland First Division; A Championship; Connacht Senior League
- Website: www.salthilldevon.ie
Home colours	Away colours

Salthill Devon Football Club is an Irish association football club originally based in Salthill, Galway. Since August 2026, their senior team plays in the FAI National League. The club also fields teams in the Galway & District League. Salthill have previously played in the Connacht Senior League, the A Championship and the League of Ireland First Division. In 2012 they played under the name SD Galway. Since 2005 Salthill Devon have hosted a youth tournament known as the Galway Cup.

== History ==
=== Early years ===
Salthill Devon F.C. was founded in 1947 as Salthill Crusaders. In 1950 they became Salthill Athletic. In 1977 Salthill Athletic merged with Devon Celtic (a club named for the Devon Park estate) to become Salthill Devon. The club originally played in Salthill Park before moving to Miller's Lane.

=== Kit colours ===
Salthill play in a home kit of light blue and white stripes. The origin of the colours come from the home kit of the Argentina national team. One of the Salthill players, Billy Shaw, worked at Moon's Department store, which later began trading under the name Brown Thomas. Shaw's manager, Leech, was an avid soccer fan and had put up a window display for the 1950 World Cup. Argentina had withdrawn from the World Cup and Leech was able to supply Shaw with a set of their jerseys.

=== Connacht Senior League ===
Between 1981 and 2000 Salthill Devon played in the Connacht Senior League (CSL). In 1981–82, together with Sligo Rovers Reserves, Castlerea Celtic, Mervue United, Ballina Rovers, Tuam Celtic and UCG, Salthill became founder members of the CSL. While playing in the CSL, the club won the Connacht Senior League Cup in 1983-84, the first senior trophy the club had ever won, beating Castlerea Celtic over two legs. The club won both the Connacht Senior Cup and the Connacht Senior League Challenge Cup on three occasions. Between 1989–90 and 1991–92 they won the Senior Cup three times in row. In 1989–90 and 1991–92 they won both cups in the same season.

After finishing as runners-up on three occasions, Salthill Devon finally won the league title in 1990–91. The club also completed a double by winning the Connacht Senior Cup, beating Westport United 1–0 in the final. In 1991–92 Salthill Devon became the first CSL champions to represent the league in the League of Ireland Cup.

=== National leagues ===
During the early 2000s Salthill Devon entered a team in the League of Ireland U21 Division. In 2006 they became the first club to win the division championship, the Dr Tony O'Neill Cup, without having a team in the senior League of Ireland divisions. In 2008, together with local rivals Mervue United, Salthill Devon were founder members of the A Championship. In 2008 they finished bottom of their group but 2009 saw a complete reversal as they comfortably won their group. Salthill narrowly lost out in the A Championship play off final against Shamrock Rovers A but as the highest placed non-reserve team, they qualified for a promotion/relegation play-off against Kildare County. However, after Kildare County withdrew from the League of Ireland First Division, Salthill Devon won promotion without evening kicking a ball. Salthill also qualified for the 2009 FAI Cup.

Between 2010 and 2013, Salthill Devon finished bottom of the table four seasons in a row. In their inaugural season Salthill Devon avoided relegation by defeating Cobh Ramblers home and away in the First Division Play Off. Subsequently, they avoided relegation because the A Championship was disbanded. Following the withdrawal of Galway United from the League of Ireland after the 2011 season, Salthill Devon re-branded themselves as SD Galway for the 2012 season. They adopted the maroon and white worn by Galway United and switched their home matches from Drom Soccer Park to Terryland Park.

=== Galway United ===
In 2012 an FAI commissioned report recommended that Galway city and County Galway should be represented in the League of Ireland by a single club or team based at Eamonn Deacy Park. The O'Connor Report also recommended that the Galway Football Association, the Galway United Supporters Trust, Mervue United and Salthill Devon should work together to form such a club. Following the conclusion of the 2013 season, both Mervue United and Salthill Devon withdrew from the League of Ireland First Division to make way for a reformed Galway United. The new board of Galway United featured two Salthill Devon representatives, Jim McSpadden and Ollie Daniels. In advance of the 2014 League of Ireland First Division season eight former Salthill Devon players, including Vinny Faherty, also signed for the reformed Galway club. The O'Connor Report had also recommended reforming the Connacht Senior League, allowing Mervue United and Salthill Devon to play at a provincial level. However, in June 2013 the Connacht Tribune reported that the plans for a reformed CSL were shelved due to a lack of sufficient interest from the clubs. The senior teams of Mervue United and Salthill Devon subsequently joined the Galway & District League.

=== Return to junior football ===
In 2023, Salthill won the Provincial Champions Cup with a 4–1 victory over Carbury from Sligo. In January 2025, the club announced a new sponsorship deal with Dough Bros, owned by two former players. In May 2025, the club completed their fourth Galway & District League title victory in a row with a 4–1 win over Mervue United. After defeating Liffey Wanderers and St. Michael's A.F.C., Salthill Devon made it to the last sixteen clubs in the 2025 FAI Cup. They drew fellow Galway side, Galway United, in the third round. The match was played on 15 August 2025 at Eamonn Deacy Park in front of 2,507 spectators, with Galway United winning the game 0–4.

=== FAI National League ===
On 19 December 2025, Salthill Devon were announced as one of the founding 15 clubs in the League of Ireland's new third tier, the FAI National League. In May 2026, it was reported that the club would be in Group 2 for the league's first season. On 24 June 2026, the club announced former Irish international Greg Cunningham as their new manager.

== Ground ==
Salthill Devon F.C. play their home games at Drom Soccer Park. During their time in the League of Ireland First Division they also played some games at Terryland Park, most notably during the 2012 season when they played as SD Galway.

== Squad ==
As of the 2026 season.

Note: Flags indicate national team as defined under FIFA eligibility rules; some limited exceptions apply. Players may hold more than one non-FIFA nationality.

No.	Pos.	Nation	Player
1	GK	IRL	Ethan Fahy
2	DF	IRL	Al-Amin Obasa
3	DF	IRL	Churchill Idemudia
4	DF	IRL	Calym Crowe
5	DF	IRL	Shane O'Rourke
5	DF	IRL	Calym Crowe
6	MF	NGR	Nnabuike Nneji
7	MF	IRL	Ben McDonnell
8	FW	IRL	Timmy Molloy
9	FW	IRL	Cole Connolly
10	MF	IRL	Josh Keane Quinlivan
11	MF	IRL	Princewill Diala

No.	Pos.	Nation	Player
12	DF	IRL	Ruari Hatch
13	GK	IRL	David Gavriliak
15	MF	IRL	Oskapolar Omorodion
16	MF	IRL	Darren Darcy
17	MF	IRL	Callum Loomes
18	MF	IRL	Jacob Carroll
20	MF	IRL	Kyle Cooney-Murray
21	DF	CAN	Richard-Miguel Lapointe-Guevara
22	FW	IRL	Ronan Kerin
23	GK	IRL	Sam Begley
24	DF	IRL	Jamal Sow

== Notable former players ==
Republic of Ireland men's international

- (Republic of Ireland) Daryl Horgan

Republic of Ireland women's internationals

- (Republic of Ireland) Méabh De Búrca
- (Republic of Ireland) Niamh Fahey
- (Republic of Ireland) Heather Payne
- (Republic of Ireland) Dora Gorman
- (Republic of Ireland) Julie-Ann Russell

Republic of Ireland U21 internationals

- (Republic of Ireland) Colin Hawkins
- (Republic of Ireland) Joe Shaughnessy

Republic of Ireland U19 internationals

- (Republic of Ireland) Ger Hanley
- (Republic of Ireland) John Russell
- (Republic of Ireland) Lucia Lobato

Other internationals

- (Saint Vincent and the Grenadines) Wesley Charles

== Honours ==
- Connacht Senior League Cup:
  - Winners: 1983-84: 1
- A Championship
  - Runners Up: 2009 : 1
- Connacht Senior League
  - Winners: 1990–91: 1
  - Runners Up: 1983–84, 1988–89, 1989–90 : 3
- Connacht Senior Cup
  - Winners: 1989–90, 1990–91, 1991–92, 2009–10: 4
  - Runners Up: 1996–97: 1
- Connacht Senior League Challenge Cup
  - Winners: 1985–86, 1989–90, 1991–92, : 3
  - Runners Up: 1990–91, 1995–96, 1999–2000: 3
- Michael Byrne Cup
  - Winners: 2015: 1
- FAI Youth Cup
  - Runners Up: 1994–95, 2008–09: 2
- Dr Tony O'Neill Cup:
  - Winners: 2005–06: 1
  - Runners Up: 2009: 1

=== Women's ===
- FAI Women's Cup
  - Runners Up: 2010 : 1
