= Achill Rovers F.D.A.C. =

- Full name: Achill Rovers Football, Drama & Athletic Club
- Founded: 1986
- Ground: Fr. O'Brien Park, The Valley, Achill, County Mayo, Ireland
- Capacity: 500
- Chairman: Anthony Lavelle
- Manager: Michael English
- League: Mayo Association Football League; Mayo School Boys and Girls League
- Website: http://www.achillrovers.net/
Home colours	Away colours

Achill Rovers F.D.A.C. is an Irish association football club based in Achill Island, County Mayo. The club was founded in 1986 following the merger of Achill United F.C. and Achill Eagles A.D.F.C.. Its senior men's team competes in the Mayo Association Football League. In July 2015 Achill Rovers were named the Aviva Club of the Year by the FAI. The club currently competes in the McDonnell Construction League 2 of the Mayo Association Football League.

== History ==
=== Early years ===
In 1974 Achill United was formed by Fr. Vincent O'Brien. Achill Rovers home ground is named after Fr. O'Brien. In August 1979 Achill Eagles Athletic Drama & Football Club was formed during a meeting in the Minaun Bar. Both clubs were moderately successful junior clubs. However, by 1986 it was clear that in order for an Achill team to remain competitive a merger would be necessary. By the end of the 1985–86 season both Achill United and Achill Eagles were finding it difficult to field full sides. At a meeting in the Slievemore Hotel on 21 April 1986 it was decided to amalgamate the two clubs as Achill Rovers.

=== Mayo champions ===
In 1997 and 1998 Achill Rovers finished as runners up and then champions of the Mayo Association Football League. Despite finishing the 1998 season as champions, Achill Rovers subsequently found themselves relegated following a reorganization of the Mayo League. In the addition to renaming the top division the Super League, the league also introduced new criteria for home grounds and facilities. Achill Rovers failed to match the required standards and as result the club found itself excluded from the revamped league.

=== Achill Rovers on Radio ===
In 2014 RTÉ Radio 1's The John Murray Show announced that they were going to follow and support Achill Rovers as their underdogs during the 2014 season. Packie Bonner was appointed celebrity coach for the show. In August 2014, Achill Rovers also featured in the BBC Radio 4 documentary series Crossing Continents. The episode focused on immigration from Ireland and the importance of sport in rural communities. The programme featured interviews with Enda Kenny and with players and officials from Achill Rovers, Achill GFC and Kilmeena GAA.

=== Joseph N'Do ===
In February 2015 Joseph N'Do joined Achill Rovers as a part-time coach, initially working with the U13 and U12 boys, U14 and U12 girls teams and the men's junior team. In January 2016 it was announced that N'Do had also registered with Rovers as a player. In March 2017, the club signed another international player, Togolese striker, Cyril Guedjé.

=== Aviva Club of the Year ===
In July 2015 Achill Rovers were named the Aviva Club of the Year by the FAI and were presented with the award by John Delaney. After being nominated in the participation category Achill Rovers received a cheque of €1,500. They won the award for increasing membership numbers, despite a falling population, and building a club that is open to all the community, actively encouraging new residents to become involved in all aspects of club life. Achill Rovers received a cheque for €5,000 as the overall winners.

=== Current ===
The club achieved the FAI Club Mark in 2018 and now fields boys teams from U10 through to junior level and girls teams from U12 to U17. The mens junior team competes in League 2 of the Mayo Football League. The club entered a U21 mens team for the first time in 2024.

== Grounds ==
Achill Rovers play their home games at Fr. O'Brien Park. They have also played home games at the Currane Community Sports Field.

== Gallery ==
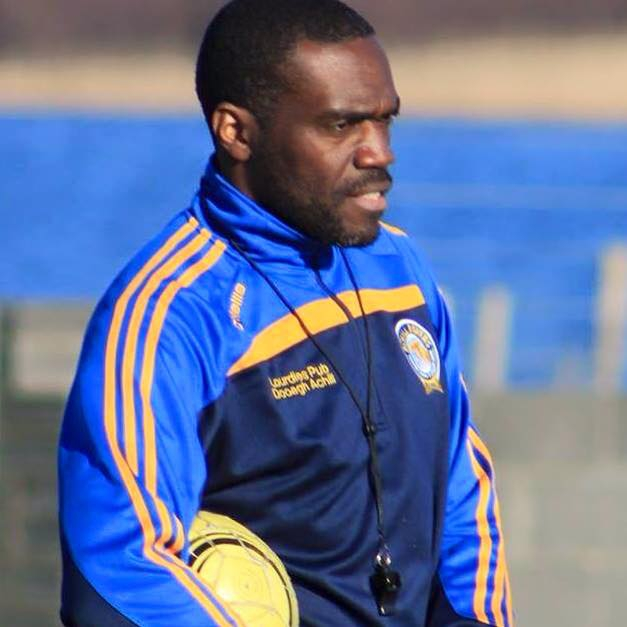
Joseph N'Do

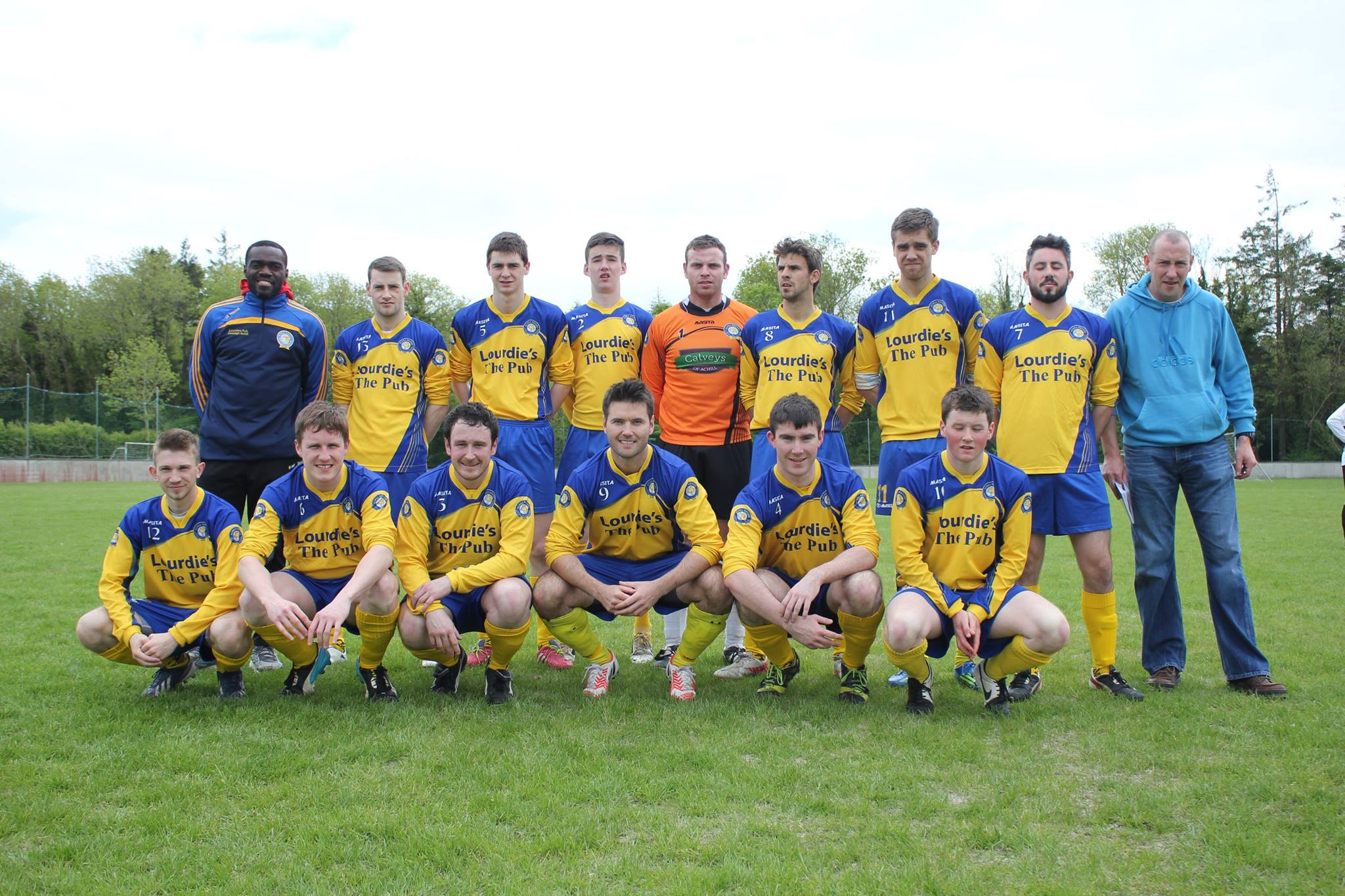
Achill Rovers senior men's team c.2015–16

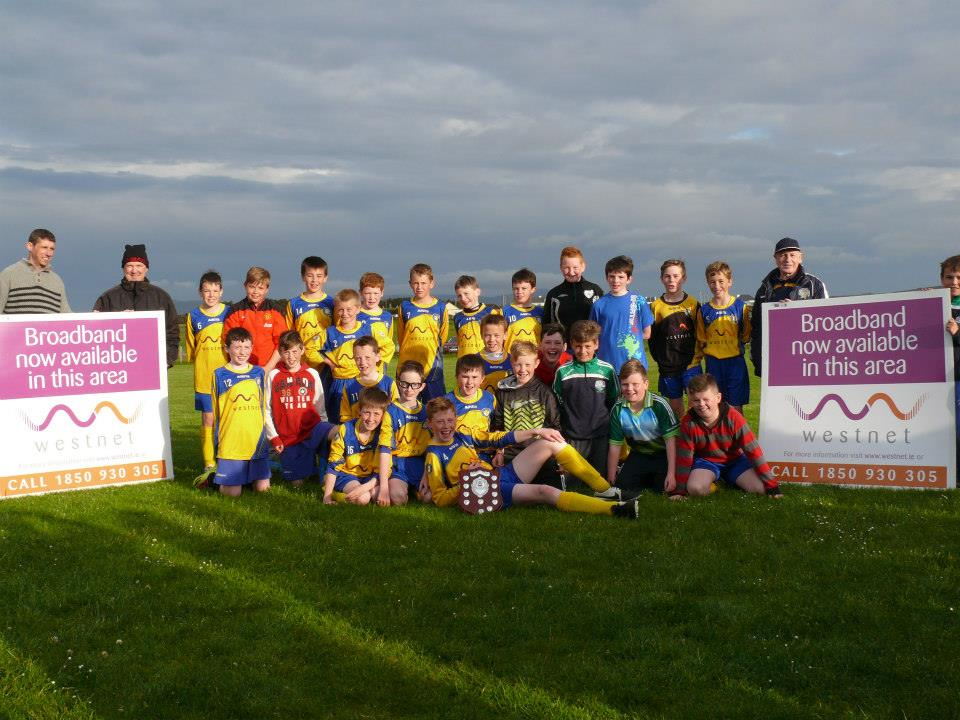
Achill Rovers U13s team 2015

== Squad ==
Note: Flags indicate national team as defined under FIFA eligibility rules; some limited exceptions apply. Players may hold more than one non-FIFA nationality.

No.	Pos.	Nation	Player
1	GK	SVK	Martin Polak
2	DF	IRL	Diarmuid Cooney
3	DF	IRL	Calum Doolan-Lynch
4	DF	IRL	Chris Western
5	DF	IRL	Mark McNulty
6	DF	IRL	Tristan Carolan
7	MF	IRL	James O'Hara
8	MF	IRL	Brandon McGing
9	FW	IRL	Micheál Moran
10	FW	IRL	Tiarnan Cooney
11	FW	IRL	Rónán Kilbane
12	DF	IRL	Sean Scott Cafferkey
13	GK	IRL	Steven Cafferkey
14	FW	IRL	Sean Callaghan
15	MF	IRL	Colm Campbell
16	MF	IRL	Ruairi Cooney
17	FW	IRL	Joseph Cooney
18	MF	IRL	Gearoid Dever
19	DF	IRL	Terence Dever

No.	Pos.	Nation	Player
20	DF	IRL	Toirlach Dever
21	MF	IRL	Michael English
22	MF	IRL	Conor English
23	FW	IRL	Dylan Guthrie
24	DF	IRL	Corey Kilbane
25	DF	IRL	Jack Kilbane
26	MF	IRL	JP Lavelle
27	GK	IRL	Paddy Lavelle
28	MF	IRL	Kevin Lynchahaun
29	DF	IRL	Callum McDonnell
30	MF	IRL	Ethan McDonnell
31	DF	IRL	Jamie McGinty
32	FW	IRL	Keith McGinty
33	DF	IRL	Sean McNamara
34	FW	IRL	Sean (Lively) McNamara
35	MF	IRL	Paul Molloy
36	MF	IRL	Ethan Moran
37	MF	IRL	Danny O'Brien

== Honours ==
- Mayo Association Football League
  - Winners (1): 1998
  - Runners-up (1): 1997
- Aviva FAI Club of the Year
  - Winners (1): 2015
