= Galway Bohemians F.C. =

Galway Bohemians A.F.C.
- Full name: Galway Bohemians Association Football Club
- Nickname: Bohs
- Founded: 1932
- Ground: Millars Lane; Western Distributor Road; Galway
- League: Galway & District League; Western League
- Website: galwaybohsafc.com
Home colours

Galway Bohemians Association Football Club is an Irish association football club based in Galway. Their senior men's team competes in the Galway & District League. They have previously played in the Western League. The club was formed in 1932 and was originally put together as a representative team of a local youth league who wanted to enter a team in the FAI Youth Cup. In 1940–41 Galway Bohemians became the first club from Galway to reach the final of the FAI Junior Cup.

Together with Castlebar Celtic, Galway Bohemians hold the record for winning the Connacht Junior Cup the most times, with 9 titles. The adult men's team are managed by Gavin Greaney.

== Ground ==
Bohs play their home games at Miller's Lane, which is sometimes spelt "Millar's Lane", in Rahoon.

== Honours ==
- FAI Junior Cup
  - Runners Up: 1940–41: 1
- Western League
  - Winners: 1936–37, 1937–38, 1939–40, 1946–47, 1960–61, 1967–68 : 6
  - Runners Up: 1966–67: 1
- Connacht Junior Cup
  - Winners: 1938–39, 1945–46, 1952–53, 1955–56, 1969–70, 1971–72, 1977–78, 1992–93, 1996–97 : 9
  - Runners Up: 1941–42, : 1
- Galway & District League
  - Winners: 1969–70, 1975–76: 2
