= Galway Football Association =

Governing body for association football in County Galway, Ireland

- Abbreviation: GFA
- Region served: (Republic of Ireland) County Galway
- Chairman: Joe Keating
- Main organ: Football Association of Ireland
- Parent organization: Connacht Football Association
- Website: www.galwayfa.ie

The Galway Football Association is the governing body for association football in County Galway. It is responsible for organizing and managing the Galway & District League, Eamonn Deacy Park, and Galway W.F.C.

== Affiliated leagues ==
- Galway & District League
- Galway FA Ladies Senior League

== Cup competitions ==
- Galway Cup
- Michael Byrne Cup

== See also ==
- Irish Universities Football Union
- Munster Football Association
- Leinster Football Association
- Women's Football Association of Ireland
