= Galway & District League =

- Country: (Republic of Ireland) Ireland
- Region: Galway
- Divisions: Premier Division; Championship; Division 1 Division 2
- Level on pyramid: 7–10
- Domestic cup(s): FAI Junior Cup; Connacht Junior Cup; Connacht Senior Cup
- League cup(s): Michael Byrne Cup; Joe Ryan Championship Cup; Jack Lillis Division 1 Cup; Schweppes Division 2 Cup
- Most championships: Mervue United (13)
- Website: galwayfa.ie

The Galway & District League is an association football league organized by the Galway Football Association. It features amateur and junior clubs from County Galway. As of 2025, the league has four divisions. Its top division, the Premier Division, is a seventh level division in the Republic of Ireland football league system. Galway & District League teams also compete in the FAI Junior Cup. It is currently sponsored by Western Hygiene Supplies, a company based in Tuam.

== History ==
From newspapers viewed at the National Library of Ireland, the first Galway League may have been played in 1925–26. It was won by Galway Celtic Albion F.C. with the runners up being Galway Celtic F.C. There is no formal relegation system with any other league within the Republic of Ireland football league system. However, both Mervue United and Salthill Devon played in the inaugural 2008 A Championship season. They were both subsequently promoted to the League of Ireland First Division. In 2014 both clubs withdrew to make way for a single Galway team – Galway F.C. – later known as Galway United. The senior teams of Mervue United and Salthill Devon subsequently rejoined the Galway & District League.

The league operated a fifth division, called Division 4, until 2018. An Under–21 league has been in place since 2018 with the league expanding to two divisions, the U21 Premier & U21 Championship, in 2022.

Ahead of the 2022–23 season, Division 1 was renamed the 'Championship'. This had a cascading effect, with Division 2 now known as 'Division 1' and Division 3 renamed to 'Division 2'. Since at least 2005, there has been a reserve league competition which, as of April 2025, is still in operation.

== League pyramid ==
The Competitions Committee forms a division based on the number of applications from clubs. The aim is to create divisions with an even number of teams, therefore the format can be subject to change each year. The below format has been agreed for the 2024/25 season.

County Level	League(s) / division(s)
1	GFA Premier Division 10 clubs – 2 relegations
2	GFA Championship 12 clubs – 2 promotions, 4 relegations
3	GFA Division One 9 clubs – 2 promotions, 3 relegations
4	GFA Division Two 12 clubs – 2 promotions

== Clubs ==
=== Premier Division 2025–26 season ===
Team	Home town/suburb	Ground
Athenry	Athenry	Moanbaun
Colga	Kilcolgan	Kilcornan Lodge
Corrib Celtic	Annaghdown	Gort Scully
Craughwell United	Craughwell	Coleman Park
Maree Oranmore	Oranmore & Maree	Caulfield Park 4G
Mervue United	Mervue	Fahy's Field
Moyne Villa	Headford	Presentation Grounds
Renmore	Renmore	West Park
Salthill Devon	Salthill	Drom Soccer Park, Drom East
University of Galway	Galway City	Dangan

=== Championship Division 2025–26 season ===
Team	Home town/suburb	Ground
Colga B	Kilcolgan	Kilcornan Lodge
Corofin United	Corofin	Western Hygiene Park
Corrib Rangers	Westside	Manogue Park
Dynamo Blues	Tuam	College Field
Galway Hibernians	Bohermore	Bohermore Pitch
Knocknacarra	Knocknacarra	Cappagh Park
Loughrea	Loughrea	Bushfield
Maree Oranmore B	Oranmore & Maree	Caulfield Park 4G
Salthill Devon B	Salthill	Drom Soccer Park, Drom East
St. Bernard's United	Abbeyknockmoy	O'Donohoe Park

== Other Notable Clubs ==
Team	Home town/suburb	Ground
Cregmore Claregalway	Cregmore	Cregmore Sportsfield
Galway Bohemians	Rahoon	Millar's Lane
Tuam Celtic	Tuam	Celtic Park
West Coast United	Letterfrack	Diamond Hill

== Past winners ==
Season	Winner	Runners-up
2025–26	Colga	
2024–25	Salthill Devon	Mervue United
2023–24	Salthill Devon	Athenry
2022–23	Salthill Devon	Athenry
2021–22	Salthill Devon	Athenry
2020–21	Athenry	Salthill Devon
2018–19	Mervue United	Athenry
2017–18	Athenry	Mervue United
2016–17	Athenry	Mervue United
2015–16	St Bernard's	Salthill Devon
2014–15	Athenry	Corrib Rangers
2013–14	Mervue United	Galway Hibernians
2012–13	Mervue United	Corrib Rangers
2011–12	Mervue United	Galway Hibernians
2010–11	Mervue United	Galway Hibernians
2009–10	Athenry	Corrib Rangers
2008–09	West United	Galway Hibernians
2007–08	Athenry	West United
2006–07	Athenry	Mervue United
2005–06	Galway Hibernians	
2004–05	Mervue United	
2003–04	Mervue United	
2002–03	Mervue United	
2001–02	Mervue United	
1997–98	Renmore	
1995–96	Renmore	
1993–94	Galway Hibernians	
1992–93	West United	
1991–92	Galway Hibernians	
1989–90	Mervue United	
1988–89	Mervue United	
1986–87	Mervue United	
1984–85	Dynamo Blues	
1981–82	Dynamo Blues	
1976–77	Mervue United	
1975–76	Galway Bohemians	
1974–75	UCG	
1973–74	Our Lady's Boys Club F.C.	
1972–73	Our Lady's Boys Club F.C.	
1971–72	West United	
1969–70	Galway Bohemians	
1966–67	UCG	
