= Mayo Association Football League =

- Founded: 1954
- Country: (Republic of Ireland) Ireland
- Divisions: Super League; Premier League; League One; League Two
- Level on pyramid: 7–10
- Domestic cup(s): FAI Junior Cup; Connacht Junior Cup; Connacht Junior Shield
- League cup(s): Calor Gas Mayo Super Cup; Calor Gas Mayo Premier Cup; Westaro Cup; Tuohy Cup; Tonra Cup; McDonnell Cup; League 3 Cup
- Current champions: Castlebar Celtic (21st title) (2025)
- Website: Official website of Mayo AFL

Mayo Association Football League is an association football league that features amateur and junior clubs from County Mayo. Its top division, the Super League, is a seventh level division in the Republic of Ireland football league system. Clubs from the league also compete in the FAI Junior Cup and the Connacht Junior Cup. A Mayo League representative team also competes in the League of Ireland Cup.

The league season operates on a calendar schedule, usually running from March to September. The headquarters of the league are located at Milebush Park in Castlebar, known as Umbro Park for sponsorship reasons.

== History ==
In the autumn of 1953, a group of men that included Joe McCormack and Robert Kilkellly met to form the Mayo Association Football League. County Mayo had been denied representation on the senior and junior councils of the Football Association of Ireland as the county had no organised league and the meeting was an attempt to bring more structure to the sport in Mayo. In 1954 Westport Town, Barcastle, Quay Hearts and Castlebar Celtic became the founder members of the Mayo Association Football League. Castlebar Celtic finished the inaugural season as champions and, together with Westport United, they went on to become the league's most successful clubs. Quay Hearts secured the title the following season in 1955.

During the 1970s and early 1980s, the winners of the league played off against the winners of the other Connacht junior leagues for the Michael Byrne Cup. During the 1970s the league expanded to include three divisions. In 1984–85 a league cup was introduced. It was originally known as the Robert Kilkelly Cup, before becoming the AIB Cup and then the Chadwicks Cup. As of August 2018, it is known as the Connacht Gold Cup. In December 1986, 11 acres at Milebush were purchased and became the headquarters of the league, with the new ground named as Milebush Park.

The league originally operated on an autumn/winter schedule but grounds and facilities were a major problem and games were vulnerable to postponements due to weather. To resolve this, a summer season was introduced in May 1994 and kicked off the following July. To further assist the development of the game in Mayo, the 1990s saw new entry requirements introduced for the top division. This included coaching badges for managers and higher standards for playing surfaces and dressing rooms. The top division was also renamed the Super League from the 1999 season onwards to reflect the changes.

In 2017, Milebush Park, the headquarters of the Mayo Association Football League, was renamed 'Solar 21 Park' after a sponsorship deal was agreed with the company. A fifth division, the 'CMR Fire and Security League Three', was introduced in 2021 but was short lived and only lasted one season.

Milebush Park was again renamed in 2024, this time to Umbro Park, when a new sponsorship deal was agreed. In July 2025, Kiltimagh Knock United withdrew from the top division mid-season. Their reserve side had left the third tier earlier the same year.

== League pyramid ==
The Mayo Association Football League has four divisions. The two top divisions – the Super League and the Premier Division – are sponsored by Elverys Sports and Welcome Inn Hotel respectively. The league also organises an over-35s league, known as the Westaro Masters League for sponsorship purposes. As of 2025, the Masters League has three divisions.

County Level	League(s) / division(s)
1	Elverys Sports Super League 10 clubs – 2 relegations
2	Castlecourt Hotel Premier League 10 clubs – 2 promotions, 2 relegations
3	Killeen Sports Ground League One 10 clubs – 2 promotions, 2 relegations
4	McDonnell Construction League Two 9 clubs – 2 promotions

== Ground ==
Milebush Park is the headquarters of the Mayo Association Football League and is an official FAI regional centre, hosting national programmes and events such as player development courses, tournaments, coaching education courses and trials for the national team. Also known as Umbro Park (and formerly Solar 21 Park) for sponsorship reasons, Milebush Park has previously hosted Connacht Junior Cup finals, inter-league, underage league and women's league finals.

The ground was purchased in December 1986, with a separate company setup to oversee development. A clubhouse was added in 1992 and a covered stand was built in 2001. The stand was named the Henry Downes Stand after the chairman of the league committee involved in the purchase of Milebush. The stand seats 300 people.

A second ground, a floodlit Omniturf all-weather pitch, was installed in 2003–04 with the first game being played by Mayo under-15s on 11 February 2004. In 2006, the clubhouse was extended to include new dressing rooms. In March 2014, the all-weather pitch was relaid with new artificial turf to meet the latest standards.

== Representative team ==
A Mayo League representative team competes regularly in the Oscar Traynor Trophy and the Connacht Inter League Cup, playing against teams representing other leagues. In recent seasons they have also competed in the League of Ireland Cup, playing against Connacht/Ulster – based teams from the League of Ireland. As of 2016 they have never progressed past the first round. In 2015 Joseph N'Do was appointed the head coach of the league's representative team.

=== League of Ireland Cup record ===
Season	Round	Home team	Score	Away team	Venue
2004	1	Mayo League	1–1	Galway United	
2004	1	Sligo Rovers	2–0	Mayo League	The Showgrounds
2005	1	Derry City	2–1	Mayo League	
2012	1	Finn Harps	2–0	Mayo League	Finn Park
2013	1	Mayo League	1–4	Finn Harps	
2014	1	Galway	2–0	Mayo League	Eamonn Deacy Park
2015	1	Sligo Rovers	8–0	Mayo League	Showgrounds
2016	1	Galway United	3–1	Mayo League	Eamonn Deacy Park
2017	1	Galway United	2–0	Mayo League	Eamonn Deacy Park
2018	1	Finn Harps	4–3	Mayo League	Finn Park

== Wins by club ==
Club	Wins	Winning years
Castlebar Celtic	21	1954, 1957–58, 1958–59, 1959–60, 1960–61, 1961–62, 1967–68, 1978–79, 1980–81, 1982–83, 1983–84, 1984–85, 1985–86, 1986–87, 2001, 2006, 2011, 2019, 2023, 2024, 2025
Westport United	21	1962–63, 1963–64, 1964–65, 1965–66, 1966–67, 1968–69, 1969–70, 1973–74, 1974–75, 1975–76, 1981–82, 2002, 2004, 2005, 2007, 2008, 2012, 2014, 2015, 2016, 2017
Ballina Town	5	1988–89, 2009, 2010, 2013, 2018
Manulla	4	1987–88, 1994, 1995, 1999
Ballyglass	3	1990–91, 1996, 1997
Straide & Foxford United	3	1992–93, 1993–94, 2000
Balla	2	1976–77, 1977–78
Ballyheane	2	2021, 2022
Sporting Club Westport	2	1970–71, 1971–72
Urlaur	2	1989–90, 1991–92
Achill Rovers	1	1998
Iorras Aontaithe (Erris United)	1	2003
Quay Hearts	1	1954–55
Westport Crusaders	1	1979–80

== List of Super League winners by season ==
Season	Winner	Runners-up
2025	Castlebar Celtic	Westport United
2024	Castlebar Celtic	Westport United
2023	Castlebar Celtic	Ballina Town
2022	Ballyheane	Ballina Town
2021	Ballyheane	Ballina Town
2020	Season abandoned due to COVID-19	
2019	Castlebar Celtic	Westport United
2018	Ballina Town	Westport United
2017	Westport United	Manulla
2016	Westport United	Ballina Town
2015	Westport United	Ballina Town
2014	Westport United	Castlebar Celtic
2013	Ballina Town	Ballyheane
2012	Westport United	Castlebar Celtic
2011	Castlebar Celtic	Westport United
2010	Ballina Town	Westport United
2009	Ballina Town	Westport United
2008	Westport United	Ballina Town
2007	Westport United	Ballina Town
2006	Castlebar Celtic	Iorras Aontaithe
2005	Westport United	Iorras Aontaithe
2004	Westport United	Castlebar Celtic
2003	Iorras Aontaithe	Castlebar Celtic
2002	Westport United	Straide & Foxford United
2001	Castlebar Celtic	Ballyglass
2000	Straide & Foxford United	Manulla
1999	Manulla	Ballyglass
1998	Achill Rovers	Ballyheane
1997	Ballyglass	Achill Rovers
1996	Ballyglass	Urlaur
1995	Manulla	Iorras Aontaithe
1994	Manulla	Castlebar United
1993–94	Straide & Foxford United	Iorras Aontaithe
1992–93	Straide & Foxford United	Swinford
1991–92	Urlaur	Straide & Foxford United
1990–91	Ballyglass	Castlebar United
1989–90	Urlaur	Straide & Foxford United
1988–89	Ballina Town	Urlaur FC
1987–88	Manulla	Ballina Town
1986–87	Castlebar Celtic	Westport United
1985–86	Castlebar Celtic	Ballina Town
1984–85	Castlebar Celtic	Manulla
1983–84	Castlebar Celtic	Balla
1982–83	Castlebar Celtic	Westport United
1981–82	Westport United	Castlebar Celtic
1980–81	Castlebar Celtic	Westport United
1979–80	Westport Crusaders	Shraigh United
1978–79	Castlebar Celtic	Westport Textiles
1977–78	Balla	Castlebar Celtic
1976–77	Balla	Castlebar Celtic
1975–76	Westport United	Ballyhaunis and Ballina Town
1974–75	Westport United	Ballina Town
1973–74	Westport United	Ballina Town
1972–73	Season not completed	
1971–72	Sporting Club Westport	Castlebar Celtic
1970–71	Sporting Club Westport	Westport United
1969–70	Westport United	Ballinrobe Town
1968–69	Westport United	Castlebar Celtic
1967–68	Castlebar Celtic A	Castlebar Celtic B
1966–67	Westport United	Ballina Town
1965–66	Westport United	Castlebar Celtic
1964–65	Westport United	Castlebar Celtic
1963–64	Westport United	Castlebar Celtic
1962–63	Westport United	Castlebar Celtic
1961–62	Castlebar Celtic	Quay Hearts
1960–61	Castlebar Celtic	Westport United
1959–60	Castlebar Celtic	Westport United
1958–59	Castlebar Celtic	Quay Hearts
1957–58	Castlebar Celtic	Westport United
1956–57	No competition	
1955–56	Season not completed	
1954–55	Quay Hearts	Unknown
1954	Castlebar Celtic	Quay Hearts and Barcastle

== See also ==
- Mayo Women's Football League
