= 2023–24 Ross County F.C. season =

Ross County
2023–24 season
- Chairman: Roy MacGregor
- Manager: Malky Mackay (until 15 November); Derek Adams (from 20 November until 7 February); Don Cowie (interim)
- Ground: Victoria Park; Dingwall, Ross-shire (Capacity: 6,541)
- Scottish Premiership: 11th
- Scottish Cup: Fourth round
- Scottish League Cup: Quarter-final
- Top goalscorer: League: Simon Murray (14 goals); All: Simon Murray (23 goals)
- Highest home attendance: 6,540 vs Rangers (26 August 2023)
- Lowest home attendance: 1,026 vs Kelty Hearts (29 July 2023)
Home colours

The 2023–24 season was Ross County's fifth consecutive season in the Scottish Premiership and the club's 11th season overall in the top flight of Scottish football. Ross County also competed in the Scottish Cup entering in the fourth round and Scottish League Cup entering in the group stage.

== Results and fixtures ==
Win Draw Loss Postponed

=== Pre-season and friendlies ===
4 July 2023	Nairn County	1–3	Ross County	Nairn
19:30	Dingwall 83'	Report	Wright 15', 27', 30'	Stadium: Station Park; Referee: Gordon Morrison

8 July 2023	Ross County	1–2	Queen's Park	Dingwall
15:00	Murray 33'	Report	Thomson 80'; Paton 88'	Stadium: Victoria Park

=== Scottish Premiership ===
5 August 2023 1	Celtic	4–2	Ross County	Glasgow
12:30	Turnbull 17' (pen.), 42'; Furuhashi 26'; O'Riley 73'	Report	White 60'; Brown 90+5'	Stadium: Celtic Park; Attendance: 58,772; Referee: Nick Walsh

12 August 2023 2	Ross County	2–0	St Johnstone	Dingwall
15:00	Turner 40'; Randall 51'	Report		Stadium: Victoria Park; Attendance: 4,157; Referee: William Collum

26 August 2023 3	Ross County	0–2	Rangers	Dingwall
12:30		Report	Roofe 22'; Tavernier 26'	Stadium: Victoria Park; Attendance: 6,540; Referee: David Munro

2 September 2023 4	Kilmarnock	0–1	Ross County	Kilmarnock
15:00		Report	Murray 53'	Stadium: Rugby Park; Attendance: 5,258; Referee: Kevin Clancy

16 September 2023 5	Ross County	1–1	Livingston	Dingwall
15:00	Murray 59'	Report	Anderson 72'	Stadium: Victoria Park; Attendance: 3,160; Referee: Euan Anderson

24 September 2023 6	Aberdeen	4–0	Ross County	Aberdeen
15:00	Miovski 21', 52'; Duk 42'; McGrath 47'	Report		Stadium: Pittodrie; Attendance: 15,116; Referee: Don Robertson

30 September 2023 7	Ross County	0–1	Heart of Midlothian	Dingwall
15:00		Report	Forrest 70'	Stadium: Victoria Park; Attendance: 4,773; Referee: David Dickinson

24 October 2023 8	Dundee	0–0	Ross County	Dundee
19:45		Report		Stadium: Dens Park; Attendance: 4,887; Referee: Colin Steven

28 October 2023 9	Motherwell	3–3	Ross County	Motherwell
15:00	Biereth 79' (pen.); Wilkinson 88'; Ross 90+4'	Report	Brophy 65'; Murray 73'; Loturi 83'	Stadium: Fir Park; Attendance: 5,119; Referee: Graham Grainger

31 October 2023 10	Hibernian	2–2	Ross County	Edinburgh
19:45	Purrington 42' (o.g.); Tavares 54'	Report	Delferriere 74' (o.g.); White 82'	Stadium: Easter Road; Attendance: 15,300; Referee: Grant Irvine

4 November 2023 11	Ross County	0–3	Celtic	Dingwall
12:30		Report	Turnbull 45+7'; Palma 78'; Forrest 83'	Stadium: Victoria Park; Attendance: 6,544; Referee: David Munro

11 November 2023 12	St Johnstone	1–0	Ross County	Perth
15:00	Carey 71'	Report		Stadium: McDiarmid Park; Attendance: 3,018; Referee: Nick Walsh

25 November 2023 13	Ross County	0–0	Kilmarnock	Dingwall
15:00		Report		Stadium: Victoria Park; Attendance: 4,013; Referee: Colin Steven

28 November 2023 14	Ross County	1–0	St Mirren	Dingwall
19:45	White 84'	Report		Stadium: Victoria Park; Attendance: 3,758; Referee: William Collum
Note: Fixture re-arranged due to Storm Babet

5 December 2023 15	Ross County	3–0	Motherwell	Dingwall
19:45	Murray 2'; Dhanda 18'; Purrington 56'; Nightingale (red card) 90+2'	Report		Stadium: Victoria Park; Attendance: 2,835; Referee: David Dickinson

9 December 2023 16	St Mirren	2–0	Ross County	Paisley
15:00	Leak 51' (o.g.); Ayunga 56'	Report		Stadium: St Mirren Park; Attendance: 5,402; Referee: Calum Scott

16 December 2023 17	Ross County	0–1	Dundee	Dingwall
15:00		Report	Shaughnessy 90+7'	Stadium: Victoria Park; Attendance: 4,014; Referee: Colin Steven

30 December 2023 18	Heart of Midlothian	2–2	Ross County	Edinburgh
15:00	Vargas 71'; Shankland 79'	Report	Cochrane 55' (o.g.); Dhanda 61'	Stadium: Tynecastle Park; Attendance: 18,288; Referee: Alan Muir

2 January 2024 19	Ross County	0–3	Aberdeen	Dingwall
15:00		Report	McGrath 24', 30'; Miovski 80'	Stadium: Victoria Park; Attendance: 5,791; Referee: Matthew MacDermid

27 January 2024 20	Celtic	1–0	Ross County	Glasgow
15:00	Johnston 1'	Report		Stadium: Celtic Park; Attendance: 58,850; Referee: Euan Anderson

30 January 2024 21	Livingston	2–2	Ross County	Livingston
19:45	Pittman 45'; MacKay 88'	Report	Murray 28', 85'	Stadium: Tony Macaroni Arena; Attendance: 1,142; Referee: Alan Muir

3 February 2024 22	Ross County	0–1	St Johnstone	Dingwall
15:00		Report	Kimpioka 34'	Stadium: Victoria Park; Attendance: 2,913; Referee: Craig Napier

6 February 2024 23	Motherwell	5–0	Ross County	Motherwell
19:45	Halliday 8'; Spittal 21', 87'; Bair 38' (pen.); Vale 90+1'	Report		Stadium: Fir Park; Attendance: 3,724; Referee: Matthew MacDermid

14 February 2024 24	Rangers	3–1	Ross County	Glasgow
19:45	Dessers 5', 45+5'; Souttar 90+2'	Report	Murray 29'	Stadium: Ibrox Stadium; Attendance: 48,685; Referee: Alan Muir

17 February 2024 25	Dundee	2–0	Ross County	Dundee
15:00	Tiffoney 45', 65'	Report		Stadium: Dens Park; Attendance: 5,846; Referee: Calum Scott

24 February 2024 26	Ross County	3–2	Livingston	Dingwall
15:00	Brophy 21', 27'; Sims 90+2'	Report	Anderson 47', 86'	Stadium: Victoria Park; Attendance: 3,346; Referee: David Dickinson

27 February 2024 27	Ross County	1–1	St Mirren	Dingwall
19:45	White 11'	Report	Olusanya 86'	Stadium: Victoria Park; Referee: Chris Graham

2 March 2024 28	Hibernian	2–0	Ross County	Edinburgh
15:00	Maolida 59'; Levitt 86'	Report		Stadium: Easter Road; Attendance: 15,705; Referee: Craig Napier

13 March 2024 29	Ross County	2–2	Hibernian	Dingwall
19:45	Sims 42'; Dhanda 90+8'	Report	Maolida 53'; Le Fondre 77'	Stadium: Victoria Park; Attendance: 3,774; Referee: David Munro

16 March 2024 30	Ross County	2–1	Heart of Midlothian	Dingwall
15:00	Murray 42', 49'	Report	Oda 90+1'	Stadium: Victoria Park; Attendance: 5,267; Referee: Grant Irvine

30 March 2024 31	Aberdeen	2–1	Ross County	Aberdeen
15:00	Miovski 5'; McGrath 78'	Report	Murray 26'	Stadium: Pittodrie Stadium; Attendance: 17,616; Referee: Kevin Clancy

6 April 2024 32	Kilmarnock	1–0	Ross County	Kilmarnock
15:00	Vassell 64'	Report		Stadium: Rugby Park; Attendance: 5,473; Referee: Euan Anderson

14 April 2024 33	Ross County	3–2	Rangers	Dingwall
12:00	Murray 47'; Harmon 50'; Sims 69'	Report	Baldwin 15' (o.g.); Tavernier 89' (pen.)	Stadium: Victoria Park; Attendance: 4,341; Referee: Matthew MacDermid

27 April 2024 34	Livingston	2–0	Ross County	Livingston
15:00	Anderson 12'; Kelly 53' (pen.)	Report		Stadium: Tony Macaroni Arena; Attendance: 1,531; Referee: William Collum

4 May 2024 35	Ross County	2–1	Hibernian	Dingwall
15:00	Murray 21'; White 88'	Report	Maolida 15'	Stadium: Victoria Park; Attendance: 3,856; Referee: Don Robertson

11 May 2024 36	Ross County	1–5	Motherwell	Dingwall
15:00	Murray 14'	Report	Spittal 8', 82'; McGinn 40'; Zdravkovski 90'; Paton 90+4'	Stadium: Victoria Park; Attendance: 3,399; Referee: Kevin Clancy

15 May 2024 37	St Johnstone	1–1	Ross County	Perth
19:45	Sidibeh 90'	Report	Dhanda 28'	Stadium: McDiarmid Park; Attendance: 4,202; Referee: Nick Walsh

19 May 2024 38	Ross County	2–2	Aberdeen	Dingwall
15:00	Murray 5'; Dhanda 68' (pen.)	Report	Sokler 32'; McGrath 50'; MacDonald (red card) 64'	Stadium: Victoria Park; Attendance: 6,119; Referee: Chris Graham

=== Premiership play-offs ===
23 May 2023 Final 1st leg	Raith Rovers	1–2	Ross County	Kirkcaldy
20:00	Stanton 82'	Report	Dhanda 53' (pen.); Baldwin 71'	Stadium: Stark's Park; Attendance: 6,216; Referee: John Beaton

26 May 2024 Final 2nd leg	Ross County	4–0 (6–1 agg.)	Raith Rovers	Dingwall
12:00	Murray 19', 75'; White 47'; Khela 86'	Report		Stadium: Victoria Park; Attendance: 5,797; Referee: Don Robertson

=== Scottish League Cup ===
==== Group stage ====
15 July 2023	Stranraer	1–5	Ross County	Stranraer
15:00	Robertson 72'	Report	Ross 12' (o.g.); Murray 26', 62', 85'; Baldwin 89'	Stadium: Stair Park; Attendance: 372; Referee: Grant Irvine

22 July 2023	Ross County	2–1	Greenock Morton	Dingwall
15:00	Henderson 70'; Murray 78'	Report	Oakley 37'	Stadium: Victoria Park; Attendance: 1,225; Referee: Don Robertson

26 July 2023	Edinburgh City	1–3	Ross County	Edinburgh
19:45	Shanley 51'	Report	Randall 20'; Murray 48'; White 59'	Stadium: Meadowbank Stadium; Attendance: 449; Referee: Colin Steven

29 July 2023	Ross County	3–3 (3–4 p)	Kelty Hearts	Dingwall
15:00	Sims 13'; Murray 29'; Brown 86'	Report	McCluskey 37'; Biabi 57'; Cunningham 90+3' (pen.)	Stadium: Victoria Park; Attendance: 1,026; Referee: Steven McLean
	Penalties
	Dhanda (penalty scored); Turner (penalty scored); Brophy (penalty scored); Allardice (penalty missed); Sims (penalty missed)		(penalty scored) Cunningham; (penalty scored) Moore; (penalty scored) Lyon; (penalty missed) Daramola; (penalty scored) Biabi

==== Knockout phase ====
19 August 2023 Second round	Airdrieonians	3–4 (a.e.t.)	Ross County	Airdrie
15:00	Gallagher 36', 82' (pen.); O'Connor 89'	Report	Turner 6'; White 7'; Murray 38'; Brophy 101'	Stadium: Excelsior Stadium; Referee: Steven McLean

27 September 2023 Quarter-final	Ross County	1–2	Aberdeen	Dingwall
19:45	Baldwin (red card) 14'; Turner 83' (pen.)	Report	Shinnie 8'; Sokler 80'	Stadium: Victoria Park; Referee: John Beaton

=== Scottish Cup ===
20 January 2024 Fourth round	Ross County	0–3	Partick Thistle	Dingwall
15:00		Report	Graham 37'; Robinson 45+1'; Bannigan 54'	Stadium: Victoria Park; Attendance: 2,116; Referee: David Dickinson

== Squad statistics ==
=== Captains ===
No.	Pos	Nat	Name	No of games	Notes
5	DF	(England)	Jack Baldwin	37	Club Captain
10	MF	(England)	Yan Dhanda	5	
42	DF	(Wales)	Ryan Leak	4	

=== Appearances ===
As of 26 May 2024

No.	Pos	Nat	Player	Total		Premiership		Scottish Cup		League Cup		Play-offs	
No.	Pos	Nat	Player	Apps	Goals	Apps	Goals	Apps	Goals	Apps	Goals	Apps	Goals
1	GK	(Scotland) SCO	Ross Laidlaw	30	0	25	0	0	0	3	0	2	0
2	DF	(England) ENG	Connor Randall	35	2	26	1	1	0	6	1	2	0
3	DF	(England) ENG	Cameron Borthwick-Jackson	4	0	4	0	0	0	0	0	0	0
4	DF	(Republic of Ireland) IRL	James Brown	39	2	26+4	1	0+1	0	5+1	1	2	0
5	DF	(England) ENG	Jack Baldwin	38	2	30	0	0	0	6	1	2	1
6	MF	(Scotland) SCO	Scott Allardice	17	0	9+3	0	0	0	3+1	0	0+1	0
8	MF	(Scotland) SCO	Ross Callachan	0	0	0	0	0	0	0	0	0	0
10	MF	(England) ENG	Yan Dhanda	42	6	32+3	5	1	0	4	0	2	1
11	MF	(England) ENG	Josh Sims	34	4	10+16	3	1	0	5+1	1	0+1	0
12	MF	(England) ENG	Max Sheaf	18	0	7+7	0	1	0	0+3	0	0	0
14	MF	(Canada) CAN	Victor Loturi	36	1	21+7	1	1	0	3+2	0	0+2	0
15	FW	(Scotland) SCO	Simon Murray	46	23	36+1	14	1	0	6	7	2	2
16	DF	(England) ENG	George Harmon	35	1	11+15	1	1	0	6	0	2	0
17	MF	(Scotland) SCO	Jay Henderson	14	1	0+7	0	0+1	0	2+3	1	0+1	0
18	MF	(Wales) WAL	Eli King	18	0	14+1	0	1	0	0	0	2	0
19	MF	(England) ENG	Brandon Khela	14	1	3+10	0	0	0	0	0	0+1	1
21	MF	(England) ENG	Teddy Jenks	5	0	5	0	0	0	0	0	0	0
24	DF	(Democratic Republic of the Congo) COD	Michee Efete	18	0	14+2	0	0	0	0	0	0+2	0
26	FW	(Scotland) SCO	Jordan White	45	8	24+12	5	0+1	0	5+1	2	2	1
27	FW	(Scotland) SCO	Eamonn Brophy	27	4	11+13	3	0+1	0	0+2	1	0	0
28	DF	(Republic of the Congo) CGO	Loick Ayina	12	0	11+1	0	0	0	0	0	0	0
30	DF	(Scotland) SCO	Dylan Smith	8	0	2+4	0	0	0	0+2	0	0	0
35	DF	(England) ENG	Will Nightingale	28	0	18+3	0	1	0	3+1	0	2	0
40	GK	(England) ENG	George Wickens	14	0	13	0	1	0	0	0	0	0
42	DF	(Wales) WAL	Ryan Leak	38	0	33	0	1	0	2	0	2	0
43	DF	(Scotland) SCO	Josh Reid	24	0	14+5	0	0+1	0	0+4	0	0	0
Players who left the club during the season
3	DF	(England) ENG	Ben Purrington	14	1	11+1	1	0	0	2	0	0	0
7	MF	(Scotland) SCO	Kyle Turner	22	3	5+11	1	0	0	3+3	2	0	0
18	MF	(Scotland) SCO	Scott High	2	0	0+2	0	0	0	0	0	0	0
19	FW	(England) ENG	Jordy Hiwula	0	0	0	0	0	0	0	0	0	0
20	MF	(Scotland) SCO	Adam Mackinnon	2	0	0	0	0	0	0+2	0	0	0
21	GK	(Scotland) SCO	Ross Munro	3	0	0	0	0	0	3	0	0	0
22	MF	(England) ENG	Jordan Tillson	2	0	0+1	0	0	0	0+1	0	0	0
23	FW	(Scotland) SCO	Matthew Wright	0	0	0	0	0	0	0	0	0	0
24	MF	(Canada) CAN	Ben Paton	0	0	0	0	0	0	0	0	0	0
25	FW	(Wales) WAL	Alex Samuel	15	0	1+12	0	0	0	0+2	0	0	0

=== Goalscorers ===
Rank	No.	Nat.	Po.	Name	Premiership	Scottish Cup	League Cup	Play-offs	Total
1	17	(Scotland)	FW	Simon Murray	14	0	7	2	23
2	26	(Scotland)	FW	Jordan White	5	0	2	1	8
3	10	(England)	MF	Yan Dhanda	5	0	0	1	6
4	11	(England)	MF	Josh Sims	3	0	1	0	4
5	7	(Scotland)	MF	Kyle Turner	1	0	2	0	3
5	27	(Scotland)	FW	Eamonn Brophy	3	0	0	0	3
7	2	(England)	DF	Connor Randall	1	0	1	0	2
7	4	(Republic of Ireland)	DF	James Brown	1	0	1	0	2
7	5	(England)	DF	Jack Baldwin	0	0	1	1	2
10	3	(England)	DF	Ben Purrington	1	0	0	0	1
10	16	(England)	DF	George Harmon	1	0	0	0	1
10	17	(Scotland)	MF	Jay Henderson	0	0	1	0	1
10	19	(England)	MF	Brandon Khela	0	0	0	1	1
10	27	(Canada)	MF	Victor Loturi	1	0	0	0	1
Own goals					2	0	0	0	2
Total					37	0	18	6	61
As of 23 May 2024

== Team statistics ==
=== League table ===
Pos	Team	Pld	W	D	L	GF	GA	GD	Pts	Qualification or relegation (Note: Teams play each other three times (33 matches), before the league is split into two groups (the top six and the bottom six).)
8	Hibernian	38	11	13	14	52	59	−7	46	
9	Motherwell	38	10	13	15	56	59	−3	43	
10	St Johnstone	38	8	11	19	29	54	−25	35	
11	Ross County (O)	38	8	11	19	38	67	−29	35	Qualification for the Premiership play-off final
12	Livingston (R)	38	5	10	23	29	70	−41	25	Relegation to Championship

Rules for classification: 1) Points; 2) Goal difference; 3) Goals scored; 4) Head-to-Head points; 5) Head-to-Head goal difference; 6) Play-off (only if deciding champion, UEFA competitions qualification, second stage group allocation or relegation).
(O) Play-off winners; (R) Relegated

=== League cup table ===
Pos	Team	Pld	W	PW	PL	L	GF	GA	GD	Pts	Qualification	ROS	GMO	KEL	STR	EDI
1	Ross County	4	3	0	1	0	13	6	+7	10	Qualification for the second round	—	2–1	3–3p	—	—
2	Greenock Morton	4	3	0	0	1	11	4	+7	9	Qualification for the second round	—	—	—	3–0	4–1
3	Kelty Hearts	4	2	1	0	1	11	9	+2	8		—	1–3	—	2–0	—
4	Stranraer	4	1	0	0	3	3	11	−8	3		1–5	—	—	—	2–1
5	Edinburgh City	4	0	0	0	4	6	14	−8	0		1–3	—	3–5	—	—

Rules for classification: 1) goal difference, 2) goals scored, 3) away goals scored, 4) matches won, 5) away matches won, 6) drawing of lots.

== Transfers ==
=== In ===
Date	Player	From	Fee
18 June 2023	(Scotland) Scott Allardice	(Scotland) Inverness Caledonian Thistle	Free
21 June 2023	(Scotland) Kyle Turner	(Scotland) Partick Thistle	Free
26 June 2023	(Scotland) Josh Reid	(England) Coventry City	Undisclosed
28 June 2023	(England) Max Sheaf	(England) Redditch United	Undisclosed
29 June 2023	(Scotland) Eamonn Brophy	(Scotland) St Mirren	Undisclosed
30 June 2023	(Scotland) Jay Henderson	(Scotland) St Mirren	Undisclosed
7 July 2023	(Republic of Ireland) James Brown	(England) Blackburn Rovers	Free
18 July 2023	(England) Will Nightingale	(England) AFC Wimbledon	Loan
8 August 2023	(Wales) Ryan Leak	(England) Salford City	Free
1 September 2023	(Scotland) Scott High	(England) Huddersfield Town	Loan
11 January 2024	(England) George Wickens	(England) Fulham	Loan
12 January 2024	(England) Brandon Khela	(England) Birmingham City	Loan
15 January 2024	(Wales) Eli King	(Wales) Cardiff City	Loan
18 January 2024	(England) Cameron Borthwick-Jackson	(Poland) Śląsk Wrocław	Loan
25 January 2024	(Republic of the Congo) Loick Ayina	(England) Huddersfield Town	Loan
25 January 2024	(England) Teddy Jenks	(England) Forest Green Rovers	Loan
1 February 2024	(Democratic Republic of the Congo) Michee Efete	(England) Grimsby Town	Free

=== Out ===
Date	Player	To	Fee
15 June 2023	(England) Dominic Samuel	(England) Ebbsfleet United	Free
23 June 2023	(Scotland) Alex Iacovitti	(England) Port Vale	Free
23 June 2023	(Scotland) Keith Watson	(Scotland) Raith Rovers	Free
13 July 2023	(Scotland) Ryan MacLeman	(Scotland) Elgin City	Loan
14 July 2023	(South Sudan) William Akio	(Canada) Cavalry	Undisclosed
1 August 2023	(Scotland) Connall Ewan	(Scotland) Elgin City	Loan
11 August 2023	(Scotland) Matthew Wright	(Scotland) Elgin City	Loan
7 September 2023	(England) Jordan Tillson	(Scotland) Dundee United	Loan
18 September 2023	(Austria) David Cancola	(Greece) Ionikos	Free
10 January 2024	(Scotland) Kyle Turner	(Scotland) Raith Rovers	Loan
11 January 2024	(England) Ben Purrington	(England) Exeter City	Undisclosed
12 January 2024	(Scotland) Adam Mackinnon	(Scotland) Arbroath	Loan
19 January 2024	(Wales) Alex Samuel	(Scotland) Inverness Caledonian Thistle	Loan
24 January 2024	(Scotland) Ross Munro	(Republic of Ireland) Dundalk	Undisclosed
24 January 2024	(Scotland) Ryan MacLeman	(Scotland) Elgin City	Free
2 February 2024	(Scotland) Matthew Wright	(Scotland) Brechin City	Loan
