= Yan Dhanda =

English footballer (born 1998)

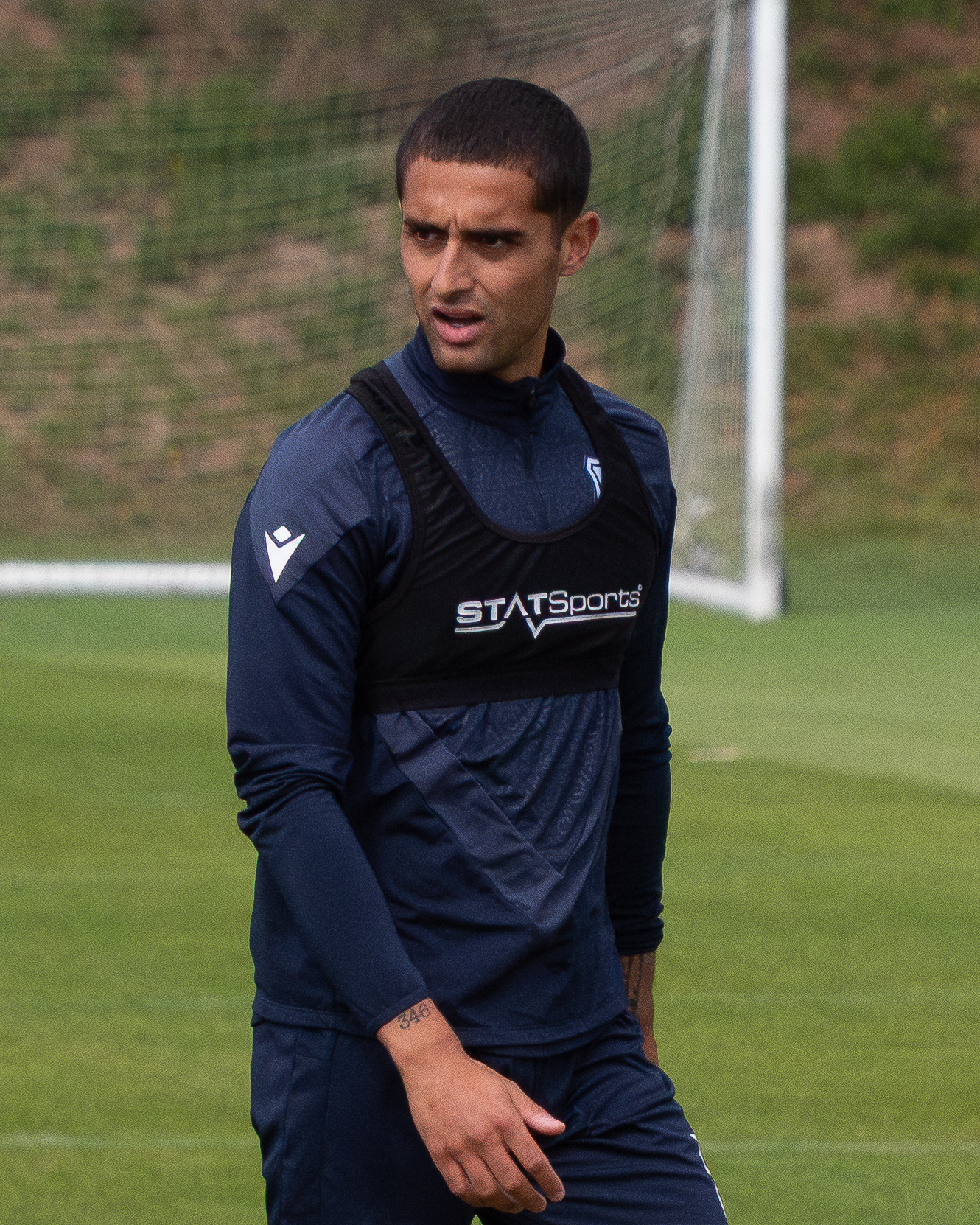
- Dhanda training for Dundee in 2025

Personal information
- Full name: Yan Joseph Dhanda
- Date of birth: 14 December 1998 (age 27)
- Place of birth: Birmingham, England
- Height: 5 ft 9 in (1.74 m)
- Positions: Attacking midfielder; winger

Team information
- Current team: Heart of Midlothian
- Number: 31

Youth career
- 2008–2013: West Bromwich Albion
- 2013–2018: Liverpool

Senior career*
Years	Team	Apps	(Gls)
2018–2022	Swansea City	50	(5)
2022–2024	Ross County	65	(10)
2024–	Heart of Midlothian	28	(0)
2025–2026	→ Dundee (loan)	28	(2)

International career^{‡}
2014	England U16	2	(0)
2014	England U17	4	(2)
- * Club domestic league appearances and goals as of 15 November 2026 (UTC) ‡ National team caps and goals as of 2 August 2014

Yan Joseph Dhanda (born 14 December 1998) is an English professional footballer who plays as an attacking midfielder for Scottish Premiership side Heart of Midlothian. He previously played for Swansea City, Ross County and Dundee (on loan). Dhanda was also a youth player for West Bromwich Albion and Liverpool.

He is a former England under-17 international.

== Early career ==
Yan Joseph Dhanda was born in Birmingham, and grew up in Tipton. His mother is from England while his father was born in England to parents from Punjab, India.

Dhanda began his youth career at Tipton Town before he joined West Bromwich Albion at seven years old. Dhanda made a decision to sign for the club's academy when he was nine. In 2013, Dhanda moved to Liverpool for a deal reported to be worth £200,000, spending five years in the youth ranks at Anfield. He previously rejected a move to Chelsea. Upon moving to Liverpool, Dhanda attended Rainhill High School, nine miles from the Liverpool Academy.

On 21 December 2015, Dhanda signed his first professional contract with Liverpool. However, he was plagued with injuries during the 2015–16 season. In his first season with the U18 youth team, Dhanda contributed seven goals, including scoring against rivals, Manchester United and Everton. He once also provided a hat-trick assists, for the academy, in a 3–1 win against Newcastle United on 1 October 2016. His performance was praised by Liverpool U18s manager Neil Critchley.

In his final season with the youth team, Dhanda moved up to playing for Liverpool U23 in the Premier League 2 campaign. He went on to score five times from 18 appearances, including a brace against Chelsea U23.

== Club career ==
=== Swansea City ===
In May 2018, Dhanda left Liverpool to join Championship club Swansea City where he was originally expected to be with the Under 23s. Upon joining the club, Dhanda said: "I am really happy to be here. I was excited from the minute I knew Swansea were interested in signing me. I just wanted to get the deal done. I wasn't really getting a chance at Liverpool and I wanted to come somewhere where I hope I will have a better chance to play in the first team. I want to show what I can do. Once I knew Swansea were interested, I felt the club would suit me. I have watched the football they have played over the years and I hope coming here will bring out the best in me." He was given the number 30 shirt.

Dhanda made his debut as a substitute for the club on 4 August 2018 against Sheffield United in a 2–1 win, scoring the winner with his first touch only moments after entering the field. However, he found his first team opportunities limited, due to strong competitions in the midfield position. As a result, Dhanda instead played for the club's Under 23s, which he was originally assigned. At the end of the 2018–19 season, he made six appearances and scoring once in all competitions.

Ahead of the 2019–20 season, Dhanda switched shirt number from 30 to 21. He began to rotate between the starting line–up and substitute bench under Steve Cooper. Dhanda then scored his first goal of the season, in a 2–1 win against Charlton Athletic on 2 October 2019. On 23 December 2019, he signed a two–year contract extension with the club, keeping him until 2022. A week later on 2 January 2020, Dhanda scored against Charlton Athletic for the second time this season, which turned out to be the only goal of the game. A month later on 8 February 2020, he scored his third goal of the season, in a 3–2 loss against Derby County. Dhanda continued to be involved in the first team, and by the time the season was suspended because of the COVID-19 pandemic, he had made 12 league appearances. Once the season resumed behind closed doors, Dhanda made four more appearances, having dropped to the substitute bench. He also started in the return leg of the Championship against Brentford, as Swansea City lost 3–1. At the end of the 2019–20 season, Dhanda went on to make nineteen appearances and scoring three times in all competitions.

The start of the 2020–21 season saw Dhanda out of the starting eleven and found himself placed on the substitute bench. On 27 October 2020, he made his first start for Swansea City and helped the club beat Stoke City 2–0. Following this, Dhanda received a handful of first team, alternating between the starting eleven and substitute bench. On 2 December 2020, he scored his first goal of the season, in a 2–1 loss against Middlesbrough. The following month saw Dhanda set up three goals, including one against Nottingham Forest in the FA Cup match. During a match against Nottingham Forest, he suffered accidental broken nose from Joel Latibeaudiere in training but made a quick recovery. Dhanda was also linked with a move away from Swansea City, with Championship and European clubs interested in signing him, but he ended up staying at the club. Towards the end of the season, however, Dhanda found his playing time, coming from the substitute bench. Despite this, he appeared in the EFL Championship play-off final against Brentford, coming on as a 63rd-minute substitute, as Swansea City lost 2–0. At the end of the 2020–21 season, Dhanda made thirty–one appearances and scoring once in all competitions.

Ahead of the 2021–22 season, Dhanda continued to be linked a move away from Swansea City but he ended up staying at the club. Dhanda appeared in the first three league matches of the season, all of them were substitute. In a match against Reading in the first round of the EFL Cup, he set up three goals, in a 3–0 win. However, Dhanda was deemed surplus of requirement under the new management of Russell Martin. As a result, he found his playing time, playing for Swansea City U23's team throughout the season. During the same month, Dhanda remained at the club when the January transfer window was closed, despite him being linked with a move. At the end of the 2021–22 season, making seven appearances in all competitions, Dhanda was released by the club.

=== Ross County ===
On 21 June 2022, Dhanda signed a two-year contract with Highland-based Scottish Premiership team Ross County.

He made his debut for the club, starting a match and played 45 minutes before being substitute, against Buckie Thistle in the Scottish League Cup, as Ross County won 4–2 on penalties following a 1–1 draw. Two weeks later on 23 July 2022, Dhanda provided a hat–trick assists, as the club beat East Fife in the Scottish League Cup. Since joining Ross County, he became a first team regular, playing in the various midfield positions. However, Dhanda suffered a hamstring injury and was substituted at half–time, in a 0–0 draw against Aberdeen on 2 January 2023; this saw him miss one match. After returning from injury, he scored two goals in January, coming against Kilmarnock and Hibernian. On 25 February 2023, Dhanda scored his third goal for the club, in a 4–0 win against Dundee United. However, he suffered a foot injury while training and was out for three matches. Dhanda made his return from injury, coming on as a second–half substitute, in a 1–0 loss against Aberdeen on 14 April 2023. He then played a pivotal role for Ross County by scoring two goals in the last two matches in the league's relegation round that saw the club finish in eleventh place. In the league's promotion play-offs against Partick Thistle, Dhanda played a vital role when he scored a penalty, set up a goal for George Harmon to bring the match to eventual penalty shootout and scored the first penalty to help Ross County win on penalties to retain their league status for another season. At the end of the 2022–23 season, Dhanda made thirty–seven appearances and scoring six goals in all competitions.

Ahead of the 2023–24 season, Dhanda was linked with a move back to England, but he ended up staying at Ross County. Dhanda continued to be a first team regular at the club, playing in the various midfield positions. December then saw him score two goals, coming against Motherwell and Hearts. He then captained the club for the first time in his career, in a 3–0 loss against Partick Thistle on 20 January 2024 in the fourth round of the Scottish Cup. Dhanda captained Ross County in the next four matches. After missing three matches due to a knock, he scored on his return, with a late equaliser, in a 2–2 draw against Hibernian on 13 March 2024. Once again, Dhanda played a pivotal role for the club by scoring two goals in the last two matches in the league's relegation round that saw them finish in eleventh place. In the league's promotion play-offs against Raith Rovers, he played in both legs; scoring a penalty and setting up two goals, as Ross County won 6–1 on aggregate to retain their league status. AT the end of the 2023–24 season, Dhanda went on to make forty–two appearances and scoring six times in all competitions. On 30 May 2024, the club confirmed his departure.

=== Heart of Midlothian ===
Dhanda signed an agreement with Hearts in January 2024, to join the club when his contract with Ross County expires. He officially joined his new team on 26 June 2024.

He made his debut for the Jam Tarts, starting a match, in a 0–0 draw against Rangers in the opening game of the season. Dhanda then scored his first goal for the club, which was a winning goal, in a 2–1 win against Dinamo Minsk in the UEFA Conference League.

==== Dundee (loan) ====
On 8 August 2025, Dhanda joined fellow Scottish Premiership club Dundee on a season-long loan. After fulfilling a suspension from the previous season, Dhanda made his debut for the Dark Blues on 23 August in a league draw away to Kilmarnock. On 13 December, Dhanda scored his first goal for Dundee in an away draw against Livingston. Two weeks later, Dhanda scored a penalty against Falkirk, the only goal in a 1–0 home win.

== International career ==
In January 2014, Dhanda was called up to the England U16 squad. He scored twice on his U16 debut, in a 4–1 win against Denmark U16 on 11 February 2014. Dhanda went on to make three appearances for England U16.

In July 2014, Dhanda was called up to the England U17 squad for the Nordic Under-17 Football Championship. He scored twice for the U17 side, in a 5–1 win against Iceland U17 on 29 July 2014. Dhanda went on to play four times in the tournament, as England U17 finished 4th place in the tournament.

Dhanda has expressed the desire to represent India internationally and carries an Overseas Citizenship of India. However, Indian law prevents overseas citizens from representing the nation in any sporting events, while dual citizenship is also not permitted. Despite this, he expressed his determination to represent India.

== Personal life ==
Dhanda is of Punjabi Sikh heritage through his father. In July 2019, he visited India (the birthplace of his grandparents) for a week with local clubs and schools to meet children and inspire them to follow their dreams.

Dhanda has said that the racism he has encountered as a British Asian footballer inspires him to play at his best. The most prominent racial abuse that Dhanda received was from a 14-year-old child from Kent, who sent a racist message to Dhanda on social media following Swansea City's 2021 FA Cup loss to Manchester City.

During his time at Swansea City, he began learning the Welsh language.

== Career statistics ==
As of 15 November 2026

Appearances and goals by club, season and competition
Club	Season	League			National cup (Note: Includes Scottish Cup, FA Cup)		League cup (Note: Includes Scottish League Cup, EFL Cup)		Other		Total	
Club	Season	Division	Apps	Goals	Apps	Goals	Apps	Goals	Apps	Goals	Apps	Goals
Swansea City	2018–19	Championship	5	1	0	0	1	0	—		6	1
Swansea City	2019–20	Championship	16	3	0	0	2	0	1 (Note: Appearance in Championship play-offs)	0	19	3
Swansea City	2020–21	Championship	26	1	3	0	1	0	1	0	31	1
Swansea City	2021–22	Championship	3	0	1	0	3	0	—		7	0
Swansea City	Total		50	5	4	0	7	0	2	0	63	5
Ross County	2022–23	Scottish Premiership	30	5	1	0	4	0	2 (Note: Appearances in Scottish Premiership play-offs)	1	37	6
Ross County	2023–24	Scottish Premiership	35	5	1	0	4	0	2	1	42	6
Ross County	Total		65	10	2	0	8	0	4	2	79	12
Heart of Midlothian	2024–25	Scottish Premiership	25	0	1	1	1	0	6 (Note: One appearance in UEFA Europa League, three appearances and one goal in UEFA Conference League)	1	33	2
Heart of Midlothian	2025–26	Scottish Premiership	0	0	—		1	0	—		1	0
Heart of Midlothian	2026–27	Scottish Premiership	3	0	0	0	3	1	0	0	6	1
Heart of Midlothian	Total		28	0	1	1	5	1	6	1	40	3
Dundee (loan)	2025–26	Scottish Premiership	28	2	2	0	—		0	0	30	2
Career total			171	17	9	1	20	1	12	2	212	21

== Honours ==
Individual

- Asian Football Awards: 2013

== See also ==
- List of Sikh footballers
