= Josh Sims (footballer) =

English footballer (born 1997)

Personal information
- Full name: Joshua Samuel Sims
- Date of birth: 28 March 1997 (age 29)
- Place of birth: Yeovil, England
- Height: 5 ft 9 in (1.74 m)
- Position: Winger

Team information
- Current team: AFC Totton
- Number: 7

Youth career
- 2011–2015: Southampton

Senior career*
Years	Team	Apps	(Gls)
2015–2021	Southampton	20	(0)
2018–2019	→ Reading (loan)	17	(0)
2019–2020	→ New York Red Bulls (loan)	10	(0)
2020–2021	→ Doncaster Rovers (loan)	28	(1)
2022–2024	Ross County	49	(3)
2024–2026	Yeovil Town	72	(3)
2026–	AFC Totton	8	(1)

International career^{‡}
2014	England U17	8	(1)
2014–2015	England U18	6	(1)
2017–2019	England U20	8	(0)
- * Club domestic league appearances and goals as of 06:42, 1 October 2026 (UTC) ‡ National team caps and goals as of 12:54, 16 October 2020 (UTC)

Joshua Samuel Sims (born 28 March 1997) is an English professional footballer who plays as a winger for National League South side AFC Totton.

== Club career ==
=== Southampton ===
Sims joined Southampton's Academy from the Elite Training Centre in 2011. After impressing with the under-23 side, Sims made his professional debut for Southampton on 27 November 2016 against Everton in a Premier League match. He took only a few moments to achieve his first assist of his senior career when he set up Charlie Austin for a headed goal in the first minute. Sims ended the first half with 95% passing accuracy, the best among all players on the pitch, as Southampton went on to win 1–0.

Sims made his Europa League debut for Southampton on 8 December, in a 1–1 draw against Hapoel Be'er Sheva.

Sims continued to stay in the mix for the first team into January and provided the game-winning assist for Shane Long in a 1–0 away win against Liverpool to send Southampton into the 2017 EFL Cup final.

==== Reading (loan) ====
On 20 August 2018, Sims joined Reading on a season-long loan. He made his debut for Reading two days later, in a 2–2 away draw with Blackburn Rovers in the Championship. Sims was brought on just after the hour-mark to replace Sone Aluko. He was recalled in January.

==== New York Red Bulls (loan) ====
On 7 August 2019, Sims joined New York Red Bulls on loan until the end of the calendar year. On 20 October 2019, Sims scored his first goal as a professional to help New York to a 1–0 lead against Philadelphia Union in the 2019 MLS Cup Playoffs, New York would eventually lose 4–3 in overtime. After appearing in nine matches and scoring one goal, Sims' loan with New York Red Bulls was extended until 30 June 2020.

==== Doncaster Rovers (loan) ====
Sims moved to League One side Doncaster Rovers on 16 October 2020 on a three-month loan. He scored his first goal for Doncaster, and his first professional goal in English football, in a 2–1 loss to Crewe Alexandra on 24 October 2020. On 27 January 2021, it was announced that Sims had rejoined Doncaster for the remainder of the 2020–21 season.

On 4 June 2021, Southampton confirmed that Sims had been released at the end of the 2020–21 season.

=== Ross County ===
On 14 February 2022, Sims signed for Scottish Premiership side Ross County. He left Ross County when his contract expired in July 2024.

=== Yeovil Town ===
On 15 August 2024, Sims signed for National League side Yeovil Town. He was released by Yeovil Town at the end of the 2025–26 season.

=== AFC Totton ===
On 1 July 2026, Sims signed for National League South side AFC Totton.

== International career ==
Sims has represented England at U17 through to U20 level. He was a part of the squad that won the 2014 UEFA European Under-17 Football Championship.

== Personal life ==
Sims grew up in the town of Gillingham, Dorset and attended Gillingham School.

At the beginning of January 2022, Sims tested positive for COVID-19, and despite having no symptoms, Sims explained how he 'didn't feel the same' and 'felt fatigued' when playing after returning to Doncaster following a hamstring injury he suffered in December. In late March 2021, Sims suffered a glute injury, which he recovered from, but still suffered from fatigue. Sims explained how he lost his appetite and subsequently lost weight. In April 2021, Sims was diagnosed with ulcerative colitis.

In May 2021, Sims felt unwell and went to hospital, and was diagnosed with myocarditis. He stayed in hospital for three nights before being released. However, within three hours of returning home, Sims couldn't get out of bed and developed 'bad chest pain' and had to go back to hospital for a week due to pericarditis. In late June 2021, Sims was admitted to hospital again as the swelling had moved to his lungs. In early August 2021, Sims started to feel unwell, and woke up one morning with a 'stabbing pain' but has since recovered.

== Career statistics ==
As of 26 September 2026

Appearances and goals by club, season and competition
Club	Season	League			National Cup (Note: Includes FA Cup, Scottish Cup)		League Cup (Note: Includes EFL Cup, Scottish League Cup)		Other		Total	
Club	Season	Division	Apps	Goals	Apps	Goals	Apps	Goals	Apps	Goals	Apps	Goals
Southampton	2015–16	Premier League	0	0	0	0	0	0	0	0	0	0
Southampton	2016–17	Premier League	7	0	3	0	2	0	1 (Note: Appearance in UEFA Europa League)	0	13	0
Southampton	2017–18	Premier League	6	0	1	0	0	0	—		7	0
Southampton	2018–19	Premier League	7	0	0	0	—		—		7	0
Southampton	2019–20	Premier League	0	0	0	0	0	0	—		0	0
Southampton	2020–21	Premier League	0	0	0	0	0	0	—		0	0
Southampton	Total		20	0	4	0	2	0	1	0	27	0
Southampton U23	2016–17	—			—		—		3 (Note: Appearances in EFL Trophy)	0	3	0
Reading (loan)	2018–19	Championship	17	0	0	0	1	0	–		18	0
New York Red Bulls (loan)	2019	Major League Soccer	8	0	0	0	—		1 (Note: Appearance in MLS Cup)	1	9	1
New York Red Bulls (loan)	2020	Major League Soccer	2	0	0	0	—		0	0	2	0
New York Red Bulls (loan)	Total		10	0	0	0	—		1	1	11	1
Doncaster Rovers (loan)	2020–21	League One	28	1	2	2	—		0	0	30	3
Ross County	2021–22	Scottish Premiership	1	0	0	0	0	0	—		1	0
Ross County	2022–23	Scottish Premiership	20	0	1	0	5	1	1 (Note: Appearances in Scottish Premiership play-offs)	0	27	1
Ross County	2023–24	Scottish Premiership	28	3	1	0	6	1	1 (Note: Appearances in Scottish Premiership play-offs)	0	36	4
Ross County	Total		49	3	2	0	11	2	2	0	64	5
Yeovil Town	2024–25	National League	37	1	1	0	—		1 (Note: Appearance(s) in FA Trophy)	0	39	1
Yeovil Town	2025–26	National League	35	2	1	0	—		3	0	39	2
Yeovil Town	Total		72	3	2	0	—		4	0	78	3
AFC Totton	2026–27	National League South	8	1	0	0	—		0	0	8	1
Career total			204	8	10	2	14	2	11	1	239	13

== Honours ==
=== Club ===
Southampton

- U21 Premier League Cup: 2014–15
- EFL Cup runners-up: 2016–17

=== International ===
England U-17

- UEFA European U-17 Championship: 2014
