= 2022–23 Ross County F.C. season =

Ross County
2022–23 season
- Chairman: Roy MacGregor
- Manager: Malky Mackay
- Ground: Victoria Park; Dingwall, Ross-shire (Capacity: 6,541)
- Scottish Premiership: 11th
- Scottish Cup: Fourth round
- Scottish League Cup: Round of 16
- Top goalscorer: League: Jordan White (11 goals); All: Jordan White (11 goals)
- Highest home attendance: 6,690 vs Celtic (2 April 2023)
- Lowest home attendance: 726 vs East Fife (23 July 2022)
Home colours	Away colours

The 2022–23 season is Ross County's fourth consecutive season in the Scottish Premiership and the club's 10th season overall in the top flight of Scottish football. Ross County will also compete in the Scottish Cup entering in the fourth round and Scottish League Cup entering in the group stage.

== Results & fixtures ==
Win Draw Loss Postponed

=== Pre-season and friendlies ===
6 July 2022 Friendly	Brora Rangers	1–4	Ross County	Brora
19:30	Maclean 80'		Olaigbe 9'; Samuel 21'; Hiwula 52'; Wright 75'	Stadium: Dudgeon Park

=== Scottish Premiership ===
30 July 2022 1	Heart of Midlothian	2–1	Ross County	Edinburgh
15:00	Forrest 59'; McKay 77'		White 79'	Stadium: Tynecastle Park; Attendance: 18,202; Referee: David Dickinson

6 August 2022 2	Ross County	1–3	Celtic	Dingwall
15:00	Iacovitti 58'		Furuhashi 48'; Jenz 84'; Abada 90+1'	Stadium: Victoria Park; Attendance: 5,502; Referee: Don Robertson

13 August 2022 3	St Mirren	1–0	Ross County	Paisley
15:00	Tait 50'			Stadium: St Mirren Park; Attendance: 4,557; Referee: Grant Irvine

20 August 2022 4	Ross County	1–0	Kilmarnock	Dingwall
15:00	Callachan (yellow card) 38' (yellow-red card) 81'; Edwards 86'			Stadium: Victoria Park; Attendance: 3,133; Referee: David Munro

27 August 2022 5	Rangers	4–0	Ross County	Glasgow
15:00	Lundstram 24'; Čolak 39', 58'; Davis 80'			Stadium: Ibrox Stadium; Attendance: 48,899; Referee: Don Robertson

3 September 2022 6	Ross County	1–1	Aberdeen	Dingwall
15:00	Akio 90+5'		Lopes 88'	Stadium: Victoria Park; Attendance: 5,210; Referee: Kevin Clancy

17 September 2022 7	St Johnstone	0–0	Ross County	Perth
15:00				Stadium: McDiarmid Park; Attendance: 3,355; Referee: Matthew MacDermid

1 October 2022 8	Ross County	0–2	Hibernian	Dingwall
15:00			Porteous 46'; Boyle 80'	Stadium: Victoria Park; Attendance: 4,243; Referee: Alan Muir

4 October 2022 9	Ross County	0–5	Motherwell	Dingwall
19:45			van Veen 26' (pen.), 51', 89'; Slattery 49'; Efford 59'	Stadium: Victoria Park; Attendance: 2,568; Referee: Chris Graham

8 October 2022 10	Livingston	0–1	Ross County	Livingston
15:00			Edwards 73'	Stadium: Almondvale Stadium; Attendance: 3,696; Referee: Graham Grainger

15 October 2022 11	Ross County	1–1	Dundee United	Dingwall
15:00	Callachan 39'		Watt 61'	Stadium: Victoria Park; Attendance: 3,744; Referee: Craig Napier

22 October 2022 12	Kilmarnock	1–0	Ross County	Kilmarnock
15:00	Armstrong 20'			Stadium: Rugby Park; Attendance: 4,640; Referee: Colin Steven

30 October 2022 13	Ross County	1–2	Heart of Midlothian	Dingwall
15:00	White 11'		Shankland 15'; Halliday 20'	Stadium: Victoria Park; Attendance: 4,438; Referee: David Dickinson

5 November 2022 14	Ross County	3–2	St Mirren	Dingwall
15:00	White 10'; Tillson 56'; Harmon 60'		Strain 13'; O'Hara 45+2'	Stadium: Victoria Park; Attendance: 3,589; Referee: John Beaton

8 November 2022 15	Hibernian	0–2	Ross County	Edinburgh
19:45			Harmon 45+2'; Iacovitti 78'	Stadium: Easter Road; Attendance: 13,930; Referee: Alan Muir

12 November 2022 16	Celtic	2–1	Ross County	Glasgow
15:00	Turnbull 62'; Hakšabanović 68'		Cancola 50' (pen.)	Stadium: Celtic Park; Attendance: 58,391; Referee: David Munro

17 December 2022 17	Ross County	1–2	St Johnstone	Dingwall
15:00	White 22'; Baldwin (red card) 61'		Crawford 77', 79'	Stadium: Victoria Park; Attendance: 4,393; Referee: Graham Grainger

23 December 2022 18	Ross County	0–1	Rangers	Dingwall
19:30			Lundstram 35',	Stadium: Victoria Park; Attendance: 6,051; Referee: Don Robertson

28 December 2022 19	Dundee United	3–0	Ross County	Dundee
19:45	Randall 9' (o.g.); Mulgrew 70'; Sibbald 90+6'		Edwards (yellow card) 65' (yellow-red card) 85'	Stadium: Tannadice Park; Attendance: 8,249; Referee: Chris Graham

2 January 2023 20	Aberdeen	0–0	Ross County	Aberdeen
15:00				Stadium: Pittodrie; Attendance: 14,356; Referee: Matthew MacDermid

7 January 2023 21	Ross County	0–2	Livingston	Dingwall
15:00			Anderson 67', 70'	Stadium: Victoria Park; Attendance: 3,083; Referee: William Collum

14 January 2023 22	Motherwell	1–1	Ross County	Motherwell
15:00	McKinstry 68'		Hiwula 80'	Stadium: Fir Park; Attendance: 4,574; Referee: David Dickinson

28 January 2023 23	Ross County	3–0	Kilmarnock	Dingwall
15:00	Brophy 13'; White 48'; Dhanda 63'			Stadium: Victoria Park; Attendance: 3,794; Referee: Chris Graham

31 January 2023 24	Ross County	1–1	Hibernian	Dingwall
19:45	Dhanda 73'	Report	Youan 31'	Stadium: Victoria Park; Attendance: 3,074; Referee: Graham Grainger

4 February 2023 25	Rangers	2–1	Ross County	Glasgow
15:00	Tillman 45+2'; Barišić 75'		White 65'	Stadium: Ibrox Stadium; Attendance: 49,115; Referee: Euan Anderson

18 February 2023 26	St Mirren	1–0	Ross County	Paisley
15:00	Gallagher 7'		Edwards (red card) 90+3'	Stadium: St Mirren Park; Attendance: 5,634; Referee: Graham Grainger

25 February 2023 27	Ross County	4–0	Dundee United	Dingwall
15:00	Brophy 6', 70'; Dhanda 14'; White 62'			Stadium: Victoria Park; Attendance: 4,922; Referee: Steven McLean

4 March 2023 28	Ross County	0–2	Motherwell	Dingwall
15:00	Baldwin (red card) 70'		van Veen 74', 88'	Stadium: Victoria Park; Attendance: 4,091; Referee: Don Robertson

18 March 2023 29	Livingston	2–1	Ross County	Livingston
15:00	Nouble 37'; Devlin 38'		Murray 69'	Stadium: Tony Macaroni Arena; Attendance: 1,283; Referee: William Collum

2 April 2023 30	Ross County	0–2	Celtic	Dingwall
12:00			Jota 45+5' (pen.); Bernabei 90+5'	Stadium: Victoria Park; Attendance: 6,690; Referee: William Collum

8 April 2022 31	St Johnstone	0–2	Ross County	Perth
15:00			Murray 45'; Cancola 49'	Stadium: McDiarmid Park; Attendance: 3,027; Referee: Alan Muir

14 April 2023 32	Ross County	0–1	Aberdeen	Dingwall
19:45			Duk 17'	Stadium: Victoria Park; Attendance: 6,619; Referee: Euan Anderson

22 April 2023 33	Heart of Midlothian	6–1	Ross County	Edinburgh
12:30	Cochrane 17'; Ginnelly 22', 56'; Shankland 28', 45+7' (pen.), 59'		Edwards 85' (pen.)	Stadium: Tynecastle Park; Attendance: 18,316; Referee: Don Robertson

6 May 2023 34	Ross County	2–0	Livingston	Dingwall
15:00	Iacovitti 40'; Samuel 60'		Guthrie (red card) 81'	Stadium: Victoria Park; Attendance: 3,129; Referee: David Dickinson

13 May 2023 35	Dundee United	1–3	Ross County	Dundee
15:00	McGrath 24' (pen.)		White 1', 57', 72'	Stadium: Tannadice Park; Attendance: 10,138; Referee: John Beaton

20 May 2023 36	Motherwell	1–0	Ross County	Motherwell
15:00	van Veen 90+9' (pen.)		Edwards (yellow card) 85' (yellow-red card) 90+1'	Stadium: Fir Park; Attendance: 5,289; Referee: Euan Anderson

24 May 2023 37	Ross County	3–3	St Johnstone	Dingwall
19:45	Dhanda 54' (pen.); White 69'; Baldwin 90'		May 22', 51' (pen.); McGowan 90+5'	Stadium: Victoria Park; Attendance: 4,700; Referee: Nick Walsh

28 May 2023 38	Kilmarnock	3–1	Ross County	Kilmarnock
15:00	Lyons 36'; Armstrong 49' (pen.); Vassell 78'		Dhanda 63' (pen.)	Stadium: Rugby Park; Attendance: 8,301; Referee: Kevin Clancy

=== Premiership play-offs ===
1 June 2023 Final 1st Leg	Partick Thistle	2–0	Ross County	Glasgow
20:00	Fitzpatrick 9'; Graham 45'			Stadium: Firhill Stadium; Attendance: 7,291; Referee: David Munro

4 June 2023 Final 2nd Leg	Ross County	3–1 (a.e.t.) (3–3 agg.) (5–4 p)	Partick Thistle	Dingwall
16:30	Dhanda 71' (pen.); Murray 72'; Harmon 90'		Fitzpatrick 43'	Stadium: Victoria Park; Attendance: 4,533; Referee: Nick Walsh
	Penalties
	Dhanda (penalty scored); Murray (penalty scored); White (penalty scored); Baldwin (penalty missed); Harmon (penalty scored); Watson (penalty missed); Sims (penalty scored)		Muirhead (penalty scored); Holt (penalty missed); Turner (penalty scored); Graham (penalty scored); McMillan (penalty scored); Bannigan (penalty missed); Docherty (penalty missed)

=== Scottish League Cup ===
==== Group stage ====
9 July 2022	Buckie Thistle	1–1 (3–5 p)	Ross County	Buckie
15:00	Urquhart 53'		Samuel 61'	Stadium: Victoria Park; Referee: Chris Graham
	Penalties
	Goodall (penalty missed); Barry (penalty scored); Murray (penalty scored); Pugh (penalty scored)		(penalty scored) Hiwula; (penalty scored) Olaigbe; (penalty scored) Samuel; (penalty scored) Cancola; (penalty scored) Callachan

16 July 2022	Ross County	1–0	Dunfermline Athletic	Dingwall
15:00	Hiwula 64'			Stadium: Victoria Park; Attendance: 943; Referee: Nick Walsh

19 July 2022	Alloa Athletic	0–2	Ross County	Alloa
19:45			Sims 18'; Hiwula 90+5'	Stadium: Recreation Park; Attendance: 351; Referee: Chris Graham

23 July 2022	Ross County	7–0	East Fife	Dingwall
15:00	Loturi 26'; Purrington 37'; Hiwula 46'; Edwards 48', 53'; Olaigbe 59', 66'			Stadium: Victoria Park; Attendance: 726; Referee: Mike Roncone

==== Knockout phase ====
31 August 2022 Second round	Ross County	1–4	Celtic	Dingwall
19:45	Iacovitti 68'		McGregor 21'; Giakoumakis 25'; Maeda 73'; Forrest 90'	Stadium: Victoria Park; Attendance: 4,801; Referee: Willie Collum

=== Scottish Cup ===
21 January 2023	Hamilton Academical	0–0 (a.e.t.) (5–3 p)	Ross County	Hamilton
15:00				Stadium: New Douglas Park; Attendance: 783; Referee: Grant Irvine
	Penalties
	Zanatta (penalty scored); Winter (penalty scored); McGowan (penalty scored); Martin (penalty scored); Ryan (penalty scored)		(penalty missed) White; (penalty scored) Loturi; (penalty scored) Cancola; (penalty scored) Akio

== Squad statistics ==
=== Captains ===
No.	Pos	Nat	Name	No of games	Notes
15	DF	(Scotland)	Keith Watson	24	Club Captain
5	DF	(England)	Jack Baldwin	19	
6	DF	(Scotland)	Alex Iacovitti	3	

=== Appearances ===
No.	Pos	Nat	Player	Total		Premiership		Scottish Cup		League Cup		Play-offs	
No.	Pos	Nat	Player	Apps	Goals	Apps	Goals	Apps	Goals	Apps	Goals	Apps	Goals
1	GK	(Scotland) SCO	Ross Laidlaw	43	0	38	0	1	0	2	0	2	0
2	DF	(England) ENG	Connor Randall	31	0	23+1	0	1	0	3+1	0	2	0
3	DF	(England) ENG	Ben Purrington	18	1	11	0	0	0	5	1	1+1	0
4	MF	(Austria) AUT	David Cancola	37	2	22+8	2	0+1	0	1+3	0	1+1	0
5	DF	(England) ENG	Jack Baldwin	34	1	27+2	1	1	0	2	0	2	0
6	DF	(Scotland) SCO	Alex Iacovitti	41	4	36	3	0	0	5	1	0	0
7	FW	(England) ENG	Owura Edwards	36	5	15+14	3	1	0	3+2	2	1	0
8	MF	(Scotland) SCO	Ross Callachan	28	1	17+7	1	1	0	3	0	0	0
9	FW	(England) ENG	Dominic Samuel	15	1	3+8	0	0	0	2+2	1	0	0
10	MF	(England) ENG	Yan Dhanda	37	6	23+7	5	1	0	3+1	0	2	1
11	MF	(England) ENG	Josh Sims	27	1	10+10	0	0+1	0	4+1	1	0+1	0
14	MF	(Canada) CAN	Victor Loturi	33	1	20+7	0	0+1	0	2+1	1	2	0
15	DF	(Scotland) SCO	Keith Watson	34	0	19+9	0	1	0	3	0	1+1	0
16	DF	(England) ENG	George Harmon	36	3	28+2	2	1	0	1+2	0	2	1
17	FW	(Scotland) SCO	Simon Murray	16	3	5+9	2	0	0	0	0	0+2	1
19	FW	(England) ENG	Jordy Hiwula	27	4	10+11	1	1	0	3+2	3	0	0
21	GK	(Scotland) SCO	Ross Munro	1	0	0	0	0	0	1	0	0	0
22	MF	(England) ENG	Jordan Tillson	32	1	19+9	1	0	0	2	0	1+1	0
24	MF	(Canada) CAN	Ben Paton	11	0	3+4	0	0	0	2+2	0	0	0
25	FW	(Wales) WAL	Alex Samuel	13	1	3+7	1	0+1	0	0	0	2	0
26	FW	(Scotland) SCO	Jordan White	45	11	33+5	11	0+1	0	3+1	0	2	0
27	FW	(Scotland) SCO	Eamonn Brophy	8	3	8	3	0	0	0	0	0	0
29	MF	(Wales) WAL	Gwion Edwards	5	0	4+1	0	0	0	0	0	0	0
30	DF	(Scotland) SCO	Dylan Smith	14	0	5+8	0	0	0	0	0	1	0
34	FW	(England) ENG	George Robesten	0	0	0	0	0	0	0	0	0	0
35	DF	(Scotland) SCO	Zach MacPhee	0	0	0	0	0	0	0	0	0	0
36	MF	(Scotland) SCO	Jamie Williamson	1	0	0	0	0	0	0	0	0+1	0
42	MF	(Liberia) LBR	Nohan Kenneh	19	0	13+3	0	1	0	0	0	1+1	0
49	FW	(England) ENG	Josh Stones	6	0	0+6	0	0	0	0	0	0	0
Players who left the club during the season
12	DF	(England) ENG	Callum Johnson	21	0	14+4	0	0	0	2+1	0	0	0
17	FW	(Belgium) BEL	Kazeem Olaigbe	25	2	7+12	0	1	0	1+4	2	0	0
18	FW	(South Sudan) SSD	William Akio	14	1	2+10	1	0+1	0	0+1	0	0	0
20	MF	(Scotland) SCO	Adam Mackinnon	0	0	0	0	0	0	0	0	0	0
23	FW	(Scotland) SCO	Matthew Wright	0	0	0	0	0	0	0	0	0	0
28	MF	(Scotland) SCO	Ryan MacLeman	0	0	0	0	0	0	0	0	0	0
31	GK	(England) ENG	Jake Eastwood	2	0	0	0	0	0	2	0	0	0
32	DF	(Scotland) SCO	Connall Ewan	0	0	0	0	0	0	0	0	0	0
33	MF	(Scotland) SCO	Andrew Macleod	0	0	0	0	0	0	0	0	0	0
41	GK	(Scotland) SCO	Logan Ross	0	0	0	0	0	0	0	0	0	0

=== Goalscorers ===
Rank	No.	Nat.	Po.	Name	Premiership	Scottish Cup	League Cup	Play-offs	Total
1	26	(Scotland)	FW	Jordan White	11	0	0	0	11
2	10	(England)	MF	Yan Dhanda	5	0	0	1	6
3	7	(England)	FW	Owura Edwards	3	0	2	0	5
4	6	(Scotland)	DF	Alex Iacovitti	3	0	1	0	4
4	19	(England)	FW	Jordy Hiwula	1	0	3	0	4
6	27	(Scotland)	FW	Eamonn Brophy	3	0	0	0	3
6	17	(Scotland)	FW	Simon Murray	2	0	0	1	3
6	16	(England)	DF	George Harmon	2	0	0	1	3
9	4	(Austria)	MF	David Cancola	2	0	0	0	2
9	17	(Belgium)	FW	Kazeem Olaigbe	0	0	2	0	2
11	26	(South Sudan)	FW	William Akio	1	0	0	0	1
11	25	(Wales)	FW	Alex Samuel	1	0	0	0	1
11	8	(Scotland)	MF	Ross Callachan	1	0	0	0	1
11	22	(England)	MF	Jordan Tillson	1	0	0	0	1
11	5	(England)	DF	Jack Baldwin	1	0	0	0	1
11	9	(England)	FW	Dominic Samuel	0	0	1	0	1
11	11	(England)	MF	Josh Sims	0	0	1	0	1
11	14	(Canada)	MF	Victor Loturi	0	0	1	0	1
11	3	(England)	DF	Ben Purrington	0	0	1	0	1
Total					37	0	12	3	52
As of 4 June 2023

== Team statistics ==
=== League table ===
Pos	Team	Pld	W	D	L	GF	GA	GD	Pts	Qualification or relegation (Note: Teams play each other three times (33 matches), before the league is split into two groups (the top six and the bottom six).)
8	Livingston	38	13	7	18	36	60	−24	46	
9	St Johnstone	38	12	7	19	41	59	−18	43	
10	Kilmarnock	38	11	7	20	37	62	−25	40	
11	Ross County (O)	38	9	7	22	37	60	−23	34	Qualification for the Premiership play-off final
12	Dundee United (R)	38	8	7	23	40	70	−30	31	Relegation to Championship

Rules for classification: 1) Points; 2) Goal difference; 3) Goals scored; 4) Head-to-Head points; 5) Head-to-Head goal difference; 6) Play-off (only if deciding champion, UEFA competitions qualification, second stage group allocation or relegation).
(O) Play-off winners; (R) Relegated

=== League cup table ===
Pos	Team	Pld	W	PW	PL	L	GF	GA	GD	Pts	Qualification	ROS	DNF	ALL	EFI	BUC
1	Ross County	4	3	1	0	0	11	1	+10	11	Qualification for the second round	—	1–0	—	7–0	—
2	Dunfermline Athletic	4	2	0	1	1	8	2	+6	7		—	—	1–1p	—	5–0
3	Alloa Athletic	4	1	2	0	1	6	5	+1	7		0–2	—	—	p1–1	—
4	East Fife	4	1	0	1	2	4	12	−8	4		—	0–2	—	—	3–2
5	Buckie Thistle	4	0	0	1	3	4	13	−9	1		1–1p	—	1–4	—	—

Rules for classification: 1) goal difference, 2) goals scored, 3) away goals scored, 4) matches won, 5) away matches won, 6) drawing of lots.

== Transfers ==
=== In ===
Date	Player	From	Fee
21 June 2022	(Canada) Victor Loturi	(Canada) Cavalry FC	Undisclosed
21 June 2022	(England) Yan Dhanda	(Wales) Swansea City	Free
22 June 2022	(England) George Harmon	(England) Oxford City	Undisclosed
26 June 2022	(England) Owura Edwards	(England) Bristol City	Loan
27 June 2022	(Belgium) Kazeem Olaigbe	(England) Southampton	Loan
28 June 2022	(England) Jordy Hiwula	(England) Doncaster Rovers	Free
29 June 2022	(England) Ben Purrington	(England) Charlton Athletic	Free
5 July 2022	(England) Jake Eastwood	(England) Sheffield United	Loan
13 July 2022	(England) Callum Johnson	(England) Portsmouth	Free
17 July 2022	(South Sudan) William Akio	(Canada) Valour FC	Undisclosed
13 January 2023	(Liberia) Nohan Kenneh	(Scotland) Hibernian	Loan
24 January 2023	(England) Josh Stones	(England) Wigan Athletic	Loan
25 January 2023	(Scotland) Eamonn Brophy	(Scotland) St Mirren	Loan
31 January 2023	(Scotland) Simon Murray	(Scotland) Queen's Park	Undisclosed
2 February 2023	(Wales) Gwion Edwards	(England) Wigan Athletic	Loan

=== Out ===
Date	Player	To	Fee
26 May 2022	(Scotland) Coll Donaldson	(Scotland) Falkirk	Free
27 May 2022	(Scotland) Blair Spittal	(Scotland) Motherwell	Free
8 June 2022	(Grenada) Regan Charles-Cook	(Belgium) KAS Eupen	Free
6 July 2022	(Scotland) Logan Ross	(Scotland) Lossiemouth	Loan
22 July 2022	(Scotland) Ryan MacLeman	(Scotland) Forres Mechanics	Loan
22 July 2022	(Scotland) Connall Ewan	(Scotland) Forres Mechanics	Loan
28 July 2022	(Scotland) Adam Mackinnon	(Scotland) Montrose	Loan
28 July 2022	(Scotland) Matthew Wright	(Scotland) Montrose	Loan
12 September 2022	(Scotland) Andrew Macleod	(Scotland) Clachnacuddin	Loan
1 October 2022	(Scotland) Ben Williamson	(Scotland) Rothes	Free
6 January 2023	(Scotland) Logan Ross	(Scotland) Brora Rangers	Loan
6 January 2023	(Scotland) Andrew Macleod	(Scotland) Brora Rangers	Loan
13 January 2023	(England) Callum Johnson	(England) Mansfield Town	Undisclosed
26 January 2023	(Scotland) Matthew Wright	(Scotland) Falkirk	Loan
27 January 2023	(Scotland) Adam Mackinnon	(Scotland) Montrose	Loan
28 January 2023	(South Sudan) William Akio	(Scotland) Raith Rovers	Loan
1 April 2023	(Canada) Harry Paton	(Scotland) Motherwell	Free
