= David Cancola =

Austrian footballer (born 1996)

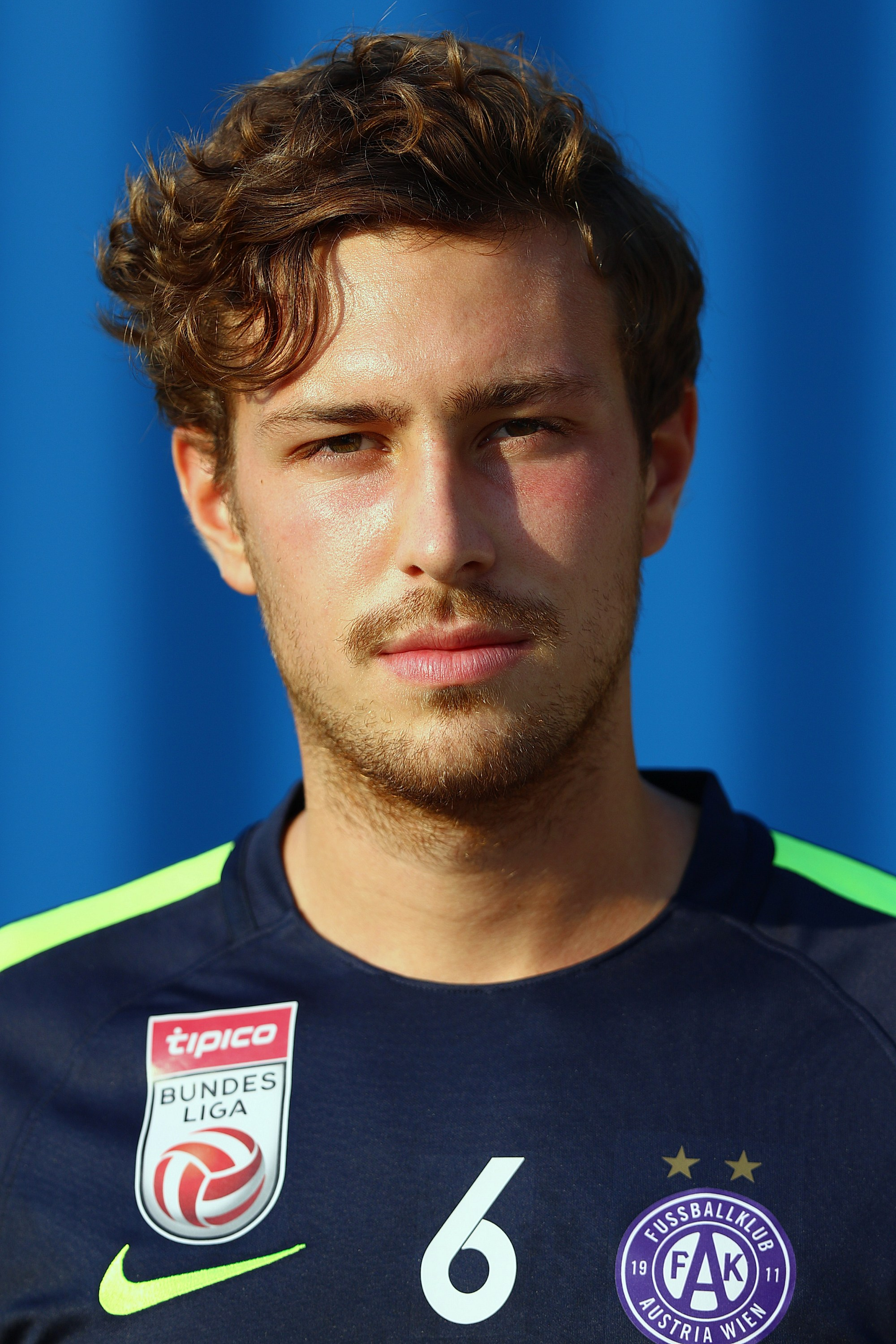
- Cancola in 2018

Personal information
- Date of birth: 23 October 1996 (age 30)
- Place of birth: Austria
- Height: 1.83 m (6 ft 0 in)
- Position: Defensive midfielder

Youth career
- 2002–2004: SZ Marswiese
- 2004–2005: First Vienna
- 2005–2007: DSV Fortuna 05
- 2007–2010: First Vienna
- 2010–2014: Austria Wien

Senior career*
Years	Team	Apps	(Gls)
2014–2019	Austria Wien II	57	(4)
2017–2018	Austria Wien	1	(0)
2017–2018	→ Wiener Neustadt (loan)	18	(0)
2018–2020	TSV Hartberg	40	(3)
2020–2021	Slovan Liberec	4	(0)
2021–2023	Ross County	48	(3)
2023–2024	Ionikos	12	(1)
2024–2025	Novara	7	(0)
2025	Hebar Pazardzhik	4	(0)
- * Club domestic league appearances and goals as of 26 June 2025

David Cancola (born 23 October 1996) is an Austrian professional footballer who plays as a defensive midfielder. He has previously played for Austria Wien, Wiener Neustadt, TSV Hartberg, Slovan Liberec, Ross County, Ionikos, Novara and Hebar Pazardzhik.

== Career ==
Cancola made his Austrian Football Bundesliga debut for Austria Wien on 20 August 2017 in a game against SV Mattersburg.

On 10 September 2020, Cancola moved abroad for the first time, joining Slovan Liberec on a free transfer.

Cancola signed for Scottish Premiership side Ross County on 23 July 2021. He left the club on 15 June 2023 upon the expiry of his contract after two years at the club.

On 2 August 2024, Cancola signed a one-season contract with Novara in Italy.

== Career statistics ==
As of match played 4 June 2023

Appearances and goals by club, season and competition
Club	Season	League			National cup		League cup		Other		Total	
Club	Season	Division	Apps	Goals	Apps	Goals	Apps	Goals	Apps	Goals	Apps	Goals
Austria Wien II	2014-15	Austrian Regionalliga	14	1	0	0	–		–		14	1
Austria Wien II	2015-16	Austrian Regionalliga	6	0	0	0	–		–		6	0
Austria Wien II	2016-17	Austrian Regionalliga	23	1	0	0	–		–		23	1
Austria Wien II	2018-19	Austrian Regionalliga	14	2	0	0	–		–		14	2
Austria Wien II	Total		57	4	0	0	0	0	0	0	57	4
Austria Wien	2016–17	Austrian Bundesliga	0	0	0	0	–		–		0	0
Austria Wien	2017–18	Austrian Bundesliga	1	0	0	0	–		1 (Note: Appearances in the UEFA Europa League)	0	2	0
Austria Wien	Total		1	0	0	0	0	0	1	0	2	0
Wiener Neustadt (loan)	2017–18	2. Liga	18	0	1	0	–		2 (Note: Appearances in the Promotion play-offs)	0	21	0
TSV Hartberg	2018–19	Austrian Bundesliga	11	2	0	0	–		–		11	2
TSV Hartberg	2019–20	Austrian Bundesliga	29	1	1	0	–		–		30	1
TSV Hartberg	Total		40	3	1	0	0	0	0	0	41	3
Slovan Liberec	2020–21	Czech First League	4	0	3	0	–		1	0	8	0
Ross County	2021–22	Scottish Premiership	18	1	0	0	0	0	—		18	1
Ross County	2022–23	Scottish Premiership	30	2	1	0	4	0	2 (Note: Appearances in Scottish Premiership play-offs)	0	37	2
Ross County	Total		48	3	1	0	4	0	2	0	55	3
Career total			168	10	6	0	4	0	6	0	184	10
