= 2022–23 Scottish Premiership =

Football league in Scotland

Scottish Premiership
- Season: 2022–23
- Dates: 30 July 2022 – 28 May 2023
- Champions: Celtic; 9th Premiership title 53rd Scottish title
- Relegated: Dundee United
- Champions League: Celtic; Rangers
- Europa League: Aberdeen
- Europa Conference League: Heart of Midlothian; Hibernian
- Matches: 228
- Goals: 670 (2.94 per match)
- Top goalscorer: Kyōgo Furuhashi (27 goals)
- Biggest home win: Hibernian 6–0 Aberdeen (28 January 2023)
- Biggest away win: Dundee United 0–9 Celtic (28 August 2022)
- Highest scoring: Dundee United 0–9 Celtic (28 August 2022)
- Longest winning run: Celtic; 12 games
- Longest unbeaten run: Celtic; 27 games
- Longest winless run: Dundee United; Motherwell; 11 games
- Longest losing run: Dundee United; St Johnstone; 6 games
- Highest attendance: 59,621; Celtic 3–2 Rangers (8 April 2023)
- Lowest attendance: 1,283; Livingston 2–1 Ross County (18 March 2023)
- Total attendance: 3,826,451
- Average attendance: 16,782

The 2022–23 Scottish Premiership (known as the cinch Premiership for sponsorship reasons) was the tenth season of the Scottish Premiership, the highest division of Scottish football, and the 126th edition overall of the top national league competition, not including one cancelled due to World War II. The season began on 30 July 2022.

Twelve teams contested the league: Aberdeen, Celtic, Dundee United, Heart of Midlothian, Hibernian, Kilmarnock, Livingston, Motherwell, Rangers, Ross County, St Johnstone and St Mirren.

On 7 May 2023, Celtic successfully defended their title, securing a ninth Premiership title and 53rd Scottish league title overall, following a 2–0 victory over Heart of Midlothian.

== Teams ==
The following teams changed division after the 2021–22 season.

Promoted from the Championship

- Kilmarnock

Relegated to the Championship

- Dundee

=== Stadia and locations ===
| Aberdeen | Celtic | Dundee United | Heart of Midlothian |
|---|---|---|---|
| Pittodrie Stadium | Celtic Park | Tannadice Park | Tynecastle Park |
| Capacity: 20,866 | Capacity: 60,411 | Capacity: 14,223 | Capacity: 19,852 |
| Hibernian | Location of teams in the 2022–23 Scottish Premiership | | Kilmarnock |
| Easter Road | Location of teams in the 2022–23 Scottish Premiership | | Rugby Park |
| Capacity: 20,421 | Location of teams in the 2022–23 Scottish Premiership | | Capacity: 15,003 |
| Livingston | Location of teams in the 2022–23 Scottish Premiership | | Motherwell |
| Almondvale Stadium | Location of teams in the 2022–23 Scottish Premiership | | Fir Park |
| Capacity: 9,713 | Location of teams in the 2022–23 Scottish Premiership | | Capacity: 13,677 |
| Rangers | Ross County | St Johnstone | St Mirren |
| Ibrox Stadium | Victoria Park | McDiarmid Park | St Mirren Park |
| Capacity: 50,987 | Capacity: 6,541 | Capacity: 10,696 | Capacity: 7,937 |

=== Personnel and kits ===
| Team | Manager | Captain | Kit manufacturer | Shirt sponsor |
|---|---|---|---|---|
| Aberdeen | (Scotland) Barry Robson | (Scotland) Graeme Shinnie | Adidas | TEXO |
| Celtic | (Australia) Ange Postecoglou | (Scotland) Callum McGregor | Adidas | Dafabet |
| Dundee United | (Republic of Ireland) Jim Goodwin | (England) Ryan Edwards | Macron | QuinnBet |
| Heart of Midlothian | (Scotland) Steven Naismith (interim) | (Scotland) Craig Gordon | Umbro | MND Scotland (Home); Stellar Omada (Away) |
| Hibernian | (England) Lee Johnson | (Scotland) David Marshall | Joma | Utilita |
| Kilmarnock | (Scotland) Derek McInnes | (Republic of Ireland) Alan Power | Hummel | Brownings The Bakers |
| Livingston | (Scotland) David Martindale | (Scotland) Nicky Devlin | Joma | Phoenix Drilling Ltd |
| Motherwell | (Scotland) Stuart Kettlewell | (Scotland) Stephen O'Donnell | Macron | Paycare |
| Rangers | (England) Michael Beale | (England) James Tavernier | Castore | 32Red (Home and Away); Unibet (3rd) |
| Ross County | (Scotland) Malky Mackay | (England) Jack Baldwin | Joma | Ross-shire Engineering |
| St Johnstone | (Scotland) Steven MacLean | (Scotland) Liam Gordon | Macron | Binn Group |
| St Mirren | (Northern Ireland) Stephen Robinson | (Republic of Ireland) Joe Shaughnessy | Joma | Digby Brown |

=== Managerial changes ===
| Team | Outgoing manager | Manner of departure | Date of vacancy | Position in table | Incoming manager | Date of appointment |
|---|---|---|---|---|---|---|
| Hibernian | (Scotland) David Gray | End of caretaker spell | 15 May 2022 | Pre-season | (England) Lee Johnson | 19 May 2022 |
| Dundee United | (Scotland) Tam Courts | Mutual consent | 14 June 2022 | Pre-season | (Scotland) Jack Ross | 20 June 2022 |
| Motherwell | (Scotland) Graham Alexander | Mutual consent | 29 July 2022 | Pre-season | (Scotland) Steven Hammell (Note: Hammell was initially named as interim manager, before being appointed on a permanent basis on 11 August 2022.) | 29 July 2022 |
| Dundee United | (Scotland) Jack Ross | Sacked | 30 August 2022 | 12th | (Scotland) Liam Fox (Note: Fox was initially named as interim manager, before being appointed on a permanent basis on 23 September 2022.) | 30 August 2022 |
| Rangers | (Netherlands) Giovanni van Bronckhorst | Sacked | 21 November 2022 | 2nd | (England) Michael Beale | 28 November 2022 |
| Aberdeen | (Republic of Ireland) Jim Goodwin | Sacked | 28 January 2023 | 7th | (Scotland) Barry Robson (Note: Robson was initially named as interim manager, before being appointed on a permanent basis on 1 May 2023.) | 29 January 2023 |
| Motherwell | (Scotland) Steven Hammell | Sacked | 11 February 2023 | 11th | (Scotland) Stuart Kettlewell (Note: Kettlewell was initially named as interim manager, before being appointed on a permanent basis on 22 February 2023.) | 11 February 2023 |
| Dundee United | (Scotland) Liam Fox | Mutual consent | 26 February 2023 | 12th | (Republic of Ireland) Jim Goodwin | 1 March 2023 |
| Heart of Midlothian | (Scotland) Robbie Neilson | Sacked | 9 April 2023 | 4th | (Scotland) Steven Naismith (interim) | 10 April 2023 |
| St Johnstone | (Scotland) Callum Davidson | Mutual consent | 16 April 2023 | 9th | (Scotland) Steven MacLean (Note: MacLean was initially named as interim manager, before being appointed on a permanent basis on 27 May 2023.) | 16 April 2023 |

== Format ==
In the initial phase of the season, the 12 teams played a round-robin tournament whereby each team plays each one of the other teams three times. After 33 games, the league split into two sections of six teams, with each team playing each other in that section. The league attempts to balance the fixture list so that teams in the same section play each other twice at home and twice away, but sometimes this is impossible. A total of 228 matches were played, with 38 matches played by each team.

== League table ==
| Pos | Team | Pld | W | D | L | GF | GA | GD | Pts | Qualification or relegation (Note: Teams play each other three times (33 matches), before the league is split into two groups (the top six and the bottom six).) |
|---|---|---|---|---|---|---|---|---|---|---|
| 1 | Celtic (C) | 38 | 32 | 3 | 3 | 114 | 34 | +80 | 99 | Qualification for the Champions League group stage |
| 2 | Rangers | 38 | 29 | 5 | 4 | 93 | 37 | +56 | 92 | Qualification for the Champions League third qualifying round |
| 3 | Aberdeen | 38 | 18 | 3 | 17 | 56 | 60 | −4 | 57 | Qualification for the Europa League play-off round |
| 4 | Heart of Midlothian | 38 | 15 | 9 | 14 | 63 | 57 | +6 | 54 | Qualification for the Europa Conference League third qualifying round |
| 5 | Hibernian | 38 | 15 | 7 | 16 | 57 | 59 | −2 | 52 | Qualification for the Europa Conference League second qualifying round |
| 6 | St Mirren | 38 | 12 | 10 | 16 | 43 | 61 | −18 | 46 | |
| 7 | Motherwell | 38 | 14 | 8 | 16 | 53 | 51 | +2 | 50 | |
| 8 | Livingston | 38 | 13 | 7 | 18 | 36 | 60 | −24 | 46 | |
| 9 | St Johnstone | 38 | 12 | 7 | 19 | 41 | 59 | −18 | 43 | |
| 10 | Kilmarnock | 38 | 11 | 7 | 20 | 37 | 62 | −25 | 40 | |
| 11 | Ross County (O) | 38 | 9 | 7 | 22 | 37 | 60 | −23 | 34 | Qualification for the Premiership play-off final |
| 12 | Dundee United (R) | 38 | 8 | 7 | 23 | 40 | 70 | −30 | 31 | Relegation to Championship |

Rules for classification: 1) Points; 2) Goal difference; 3) Goals scored; 4) Head-to-Head points; 5) Head-to-Head goal difference; 6) Play-off (only if deciding champion, UEFA competitions qualification, second stage group allocation or relegation).
(C) Champions; (O) Play-off winners; (R) Relegated

== Results ==
=== Matches 1–22 ===
Teams play each other twice, once at home and once away.

| Home \ Away | ABE | CEL | DUN | HOM | HIB | KIL | LIV | MOT | RAN | ROS | STJ | STM |
|---|---|---|---|---|---|---|---|---|---|---|---|---|
| Aberdeen | — | 0–1 | 1–0 | 2–0 | 4–1 | 4–1 | 5–0 | 2–3 | 2–3 | 0–0 | 2–0 | 4–1 |
| Celtic | 2–0 | — | 4–2 | 2–0 | 6–1 | 2–0 | 2–1 | 2–1 | 4–0 | 2–1 | 4–1 | 4–0 |
| Dundee United | 4–0 | 0–9 | — | 2–2 | 1–0 | 4–0 | 0–1 | 0–1 | 0–2 | 3–0 | 1–2 | 0–3 |
| Heart of Midlothian | 5–0 | 3–4 | 4–1 | — | 3–0 | 3–1 | 1–1 | 3–2 | 0–4 | 2–1 | 3–2 | 1–0 |
| Hibernian | 3–1 | 0–4 | 2–2 | 1–1 | — | 1–0 | 4–0 | 1–0 | 2–2 | 0–2 | 1–2 | 3–0 |
| Kilmarnock | 2–1 | 0–5 | 1–1 | 2–2 | 1–0 | — | 2–3 | 2–1 | 2–3 | 1–0 | 2–1 | 0–0 |
| Livingston | 2–1 | 0–3 | 1–1 | 1–0 | 2–1 | 1–0 | — | 1–1 | 1–2 | 0–1 | 1–0 | 1–1 |
| Motherwell | 1–2 | 1–2 | 0–0 | 0–3 | 2–3 | 2–2 | 1–0 | — | 1–2 | 1–1 | 1–2 | 2–1 |
| Rangers | 4–1 | 2–2 | 2–1 | 1–0 | 3–2 | 2–0 | 1–1 | 3–0 | — | 4–0 | 4–0 | 4–0 |
| Ross County | 1–1 | 1–3 | 1–1 | 1–2 | 0–2 | 1–0 | 0–2 | 0–5 | 0–1 | — | 1–2 | 3–2 |
| St Johnstone | 0–1 | 1–2 | 0–1 | 2–3 | 0–1 | 1–0 | 2–4 | 1–1 | 2–1 | 0–0 | — | 3–0 |
| St Mirren | 3–1 | 2–0 | 2–1 | 1–1 | 1–0 | 0–0 | 2–1 | 0–1 | 1–1 | 1–0 | 2–2 | — |

Legend: Blue = home team win; Yellow = draw; Red = away team win.
For upcoming matches, an "a" indicates there is an article about the rivalry between the two participants.

=== Matches 23–33 ===
Teams play each other once, either home or away.

| Home \ Away | ABE | CEL | DUN | HOM | HIB | KIL | LIV | MOT | RAN | ROS | STJ | STM |
|---|---|---|---|---|---|---|---|---|---|---|---|---|
| Aberdeen | — | — | — | 3–0 | — | 2–0 | 1–0 | 3–1 | 2–0 | — | — | 1–3 |
| Celtic | 4–0 | — | — | 3–1 | 3–1 | — | 3–0 | 1–1 | 3–2 | — | — | — |
| Dundee United | 1–3 | 0–2 | — | — | 2–1 | — | 2–0 | — | — | — | 1–2 | 1–1 |
| Heart of Midlothian | — | — | 3–1 | — | — | — | — | — | 0–3 | 6–1 | 3–0 | 0–2 |
| Hibernian | 6–0 | — | — | 1–0 | — | 2–0 | — | 1–3 | 1–4 | — | — | — |
| Kilmarnock | — | 1–4 | 1–0 | 2–1 | — | — | — | 1–1 | — | — | 1–1 | — |
| Livingston | — | — | — | 0–0 | 1–4 | 3–1 | — | — | 0–3 | 2–1 | 2–0 | — |
| Motherwell | — | — | 1–2 | 2–0 | — | — | 3–0 | — | 2–4 | — | 0–2 | — |
| Rangers | — | — | 2–0 | — | — | 3–1 | — | — | — | 2–1 | 2–0 | 5–2 |
| Ross County | 0–1 | 0–2 | 4–0 | — | 1–1 | 3–0 | — | 0–2 | — | — | — | — |
| St Johnstone | 0–1 | 1–4 | — | — | 1–1 | — | — | — | — | 0–2 | — | 1–1 |
| St Mirren | — | 1–5 | — | — | 0–1 | 0–2 | 3–0 | 1–0 | — | 1–0 | — | — |

Legend: Blue = home team win; Yellow = draw; Red = away team win.
For upcoming matches, an "a" indicates there is an article about the rivalry between the two participants.

=== Matches 34–38 ===
After 33 matches, the league splits into two sections of six teams i.e. the top six and the bottom six, with the teams playing every other team in their section once (either at home or away). The exact matches are determined by the position of the teams in the league table at the time of the split.

==== Top six ====
| Home \ Away | ABE | CEL | HOM | HIB | RAN | STM |
|---|---|---|---|---|---|---|
| Aberdeen | — | — | — | 0–0 | — | 3–0 |
| Celtic | 5–0 | — | — | — | — | 2–2 |
| Heart of Midlothian | 2–1 | 0–2 | — | 1–1 | — | — |
| Hibernian | — | 4–2 | — | — | 1–3 | 2–1 |
| Rangers | 1–0 | 3–0 | 2–2 | — | — | — |
| St Mirren | — | — | 2–2 | — | 0–3 | — |

Legend: Blue = home team win; Yellow = draw; Red = away team win.
For upcoming matches, an "a" indicates there is an article about the rivalry between the two participants.

==== Bottom six ====
| Home \ Away | DUN | KIL | LIV | MOT | ROS | STJ |
|---|---|---|---|---|---|---|
| Dundee United | — | 0–3 | — | — | 1–3 | — |
| Kilmarnock | — | — | 2–0 | — | 3–1 | 0–1 |
| Livingston | 2–1 | — | — | 1–1 | — | — |
| Motherwell | 3–2 | 2–0 | — | — | 1–0 | — |
| Ross County | — | — | 2–0 | — | — | 3–3 |
| St Johnstone | 1–0 | — | 2–0 | 0–2 | — | — |

Legend: Blue = home team win; Yellow = draw; Red = away team win.
For upcoming matches, an "a" indicates there is an article about the rivalry between the two participants.

== Season statistics ==
=== Top scorers ===
| Rank | Player | Club | Goals |
|---|---|---|---|
| 1 | (Japan) Kyōgo Furuhashi | Celtic | 27 |
| 2 | (Netherlands) Kevin van Veen | Motherwell | 25 |
| 3 | (Scotland) Lawrence Shankland | Heart of Midlothian | 24 |
| 4 | (Cape Verde) Duk | Aberdeen | 16 |
| 4 | (North Macedonia) Bojan Miovski | Aberdeen | 16 |
| 4 | (England) James Tavernier | Rangers | 16 |
| 7 | (Croatia) Antonio Čolak | Rangers | 14 |
| 8 | (England) Josh Ginnelly | Heart of Midlothian | 12 |
| 8 | (Scotland) Kevin Nisbet | Hibernian | 12 |
| 8 | (Zambia) Fashion Sakala | Rangers | 12 |

==== Hat-tricks ====
| Player | For | Against | Score | Date | Ref. |
|---|---|---|---|---|---|
| (Japan) Kyōgo Furuhashi | Celtic | Dundee United | 9–0 (A) | 28 August 2022 | |
| (Israel) Liel Abada | Celtic | Dundee United | 9–0 (A) | 28 August 2022 | |
| (Netherlands) Kevin van Veen | Motherwell | Ross County | 5–0 (A) | 4 October 2022 | |
| (Scotland) James Forrest | Celtic | Hibernian | 6–1 (H) | 15 October 2022 | |
| (Scotland) Lawrence Shankland | Heart of Midlothian | Celtic | 3–4 (H) | 22 October 2022 | |
| (Scotland) Kevin Nisbet | Hibernian | Motherwell | 3–2 (A) | 8 January 2023 | |
| (Scotland) Josh Campbell | Hibernian | Aberdeen | 6–0 (H) | 28 January 2023 | |
| (Scotland) Lawrence Shankland | Heart of Midlothian | Ross County | 6–1 (H) | 22 April 2023 | |
| (Scotland) Jordan White | Ross County | Dundee United | 3–1 (A) | 13 May 2023 | |

=== Clean sheets ===
| Rank | Player | Club | Clean sheets |
|---|---|---|---|
| 1 | (England) Joe Hart | Celtic | 16 |
| 2 | (Netherlands) Kelle Roos | Aberdeen | 13 |
| 3 | (Scotland) David Marshall | Hibernian | 11 |
| 3 | (Scotland) Liam Kelly | Motherwell | 11 |
| 5 | (Northern Ireland) Trevor Carson | St Mirren | 10 |
| 6 | (Scotland) Ross Laidlaw | Ross County | 9 |
| 7 | (Scotland) Allan McGregor | Rangers | 8 |
| 8 | (England) Shamal George | Livingston | 7 |
| 9 | (England) Sam Walker | Kilmarnock | 6 |
| 9 | (England) Remi Matthews | St Johnstone | 6 |

=== Attendances ===
These are the average attendances of the teams.

| Pos | Team | Total | High | Low | Average | Change |
|---|---|---|---|---|---|---|
| 1 | Celtic | 1,116,725 | 59,621 | 58,295 | 58,775 | +1.6% |
| 2 | Rangers | 933,207 | 50,104 | 46,961 | 49,116 | −0.3% |
| 3 | Heart of Midlothian | 351,978 | 18,980 | 18,081 | 18,525 | +6.6% |
| 4 | Hibernian | 331,926 | 20,179 | 13,930 | 17,469 | +12.8% |
| 5 | Aberdeen | 297,087 | 18,666 | 13,014 | 15,636 | +20.9% |
| 6 | Dundee United | 179,768 | 12,599 | 7,430 | 9,461 | +23.7% |
| 7 | Kilmarnock (Note: Club was playing in the Scottish Championship in the previous season.) | 123,253 | 9,162 | 4,463 | 6,487 | +30.1% |
| 8 | St Mirren | 121,610 | 7,937 | 4,557 | 6,400 | +29.7% |
| 9 | Motherwell | 112,080 | 8,610 | 4,131 | 5,898 | +4.4% |
| 10 | St Johnstone | 101,081 | 7,758 | 2,899 | 5,320 | +18.1% |
| 11 | Ross County | 82,978 | 6,690 | 2,568 | 4,367 | +7.7% |
| 12 | Livingston | 75,748 | 9,672 | 1,283 | 3,986 | +8.9% |
| | League total | 3,826,451 | 59,621 | 1,283 | 16,782 | +6.2% |

== Awards ==
| Month | Manager of the Month | | Player of the Month | |
| Month | Manager | Club | Player | Club |
|---|---|---|---|---|
| August | (Australia) Ange Postecoglou | Celtic | (Japan) Kyōgo Furuhashi | Celtic |
| September/October | (Australia) Ange Postecoglou | Celtic | (Croatia) Antonio Čolak | Rangers |
| November | (Scotland) David Martindale | Livingston | (Montenegro) Sead Hakšabanović | Celtic |
| December | (England) Michael Beale | Rangers | (Japan) Kyōgo Furuhashi | Celtic |
| January | (Scotland) Robbie Neilson | Heart of Midlothian | (Scotland) Kevin Nisbet | Hibernian |
| February | (Scotland) Stuart Kettlewell | Motherwell | (Japan) Reo Hatate | Celtic |
| March | (Scotland) Barry Robson | Aberdeen | (Cape Verde) Duk | Aberdeen |
| April | (Scotland) Barry Robson | Aberdeen | (Netherlands) Kevin van Veen | Motherwell |

The SPFL Premiership manager of the year was Ange Postecoglou of Celtic.

The SPFL Premiership player of the year was Kyōgo Furuhashi of Celtic.

=== Annual awards ===
| Award | Winner | Club |
|---|---|---|
| William Hill Premiership Player of the Year | (Japan) Kyogo Furuhashi | Celtic |
| PFA Scotland Premiership Player of the Year | (Japan) Kyogo Furuhashi | Celtic |
| PFA Scotland SPFL Young Player of the Year | (United States) Malik Tillman | Rangers |
| PFA Scotland SPFL Manager of the Year | (Australia) Ange Postecoglou | Celtic |
| PFA Scotland Goal of the Season | (Portugal) Jota | Celtic |
| SFWA Player of the Year | (Japan) Kyogo Furuhashi | Celtic |

PFA Scotland Team of the Year
| Goalkeeper | (England) Joe Hart (Celtic) | | | |
| Defenders | (England) James Tavernier (Rangers) | (United States) Cameron Carter-Vickers (Celtic) | (Sweden) Carl Starfelt (Celtic) | (Scotland) Greg Taylor (Celtic) |
| Midfielders | (United States) Malik Tillman (Rangers) | | (Scotland) Callum McGregor (Celtic) | (Japan) Reo Hatate (Celtic) |
| Forwards | (Cape Verde) Luis Lopes (Aberdeen) | | (Japan) Kyogo Furuhashi (Celtic) | (Netherlands) Kevin van Veen (Motherwell) |

== Premiership play-offs ==
The quarter-finals were contested by the teams placed third and fourth in the 2022–23 Scottish Championship. The winners advanced to the semi-finals to face the team placed second in the Championship. The final was contested by the semi-final winners and the team placed eleventh in the Premiership, with the winners securing a place in the 2023–24 Scottish Premiership.

=== Qualified teams ===
| Team | Rank |
|---|---|
| Ross County | 1 |
| Ayr United | 2 |
| Queen's Park | 3 |
| Partick Thistle | 4 |

Quarter-final
3 | Queen's Park | 3 | 0 | 3
4 | Partick Thistle | 4 | 4 | 8

Semi-final
2 | Ayr United | 0 | 0 | 0
4 | Partick Thistle | 3 | 5 | 8

Final
1 | Ross County | 0 | 3 | 3 (5)
4 | Partick Thistle | 2 | 1 | 3 (4)

=== Quarter-finals ===
==== First leg ====
| 9 May 2023 | Partick Thistle | 4–3 | Queen's Park | Glasgow |
| 19:45 | Turner 15'; McMillan 28'; Fitzpatrick 69'; Graham 90+7' | | Thomas 33', 87'; Boateng 83' | Stadium: Firhill Stadium; Attendance: 3,754; Referee: Kevin Clancy |

==== Second leg ====
| 12 May 2023 | Queen's Park | 0–4 (3–8 agg.) | Partick Thistle | Stenhousemuir |
| 19:45 | | | Graham 14'; Tiffoney 28'; Holt 41'; Mullen 82' | Stadium: Ochilview Park; Attendance: 1,581; Referee: Colin Steven |

=== Semi-finals ===
==== First leg ====
| 19 May 2023 | Partick Thistle | 3–0 | Ayr United | Glasgow |
| 19:45 | McMillan 16'; Graham 50', 72' | | | Stadium: Firhill Stadium; Attendance: 7,012; Referee: Greg Aitken |

==== Second leg ====
| 26 May 2023 | Ayr United | 0–5 (0–8 agg.) | Partick Thistle | Ayr |
| 19:45 | | | McMillan 7'; Tiffoney 27', 54'; Lawless 63'; Holt 88' | Stadium: Somerset Park; Attendance: 5,811; Referee: Colin Steven |

=== Final ===
==== First leg ====
| 1 June 2023 | Partick Thistle | 2–0 | Ross County | Glasgow |
| 20:00 | Fitzpatrick 9'; Graham 45' | | | Stadium: Firhill Stadium; Attendance: 7,291; Referee: David Munro |

==== Second leg ====
| 4 June 2023 | Ross County | 3–1 (a.e.t.) (3–3 agg.) (5–4 p) | Partick Thistle | Dingwall |
| 16:30 | Dhanda 71' (pen.); Murray 72'; Harmon 90' | | Fitzpatrick 43' | Stadium: Victoria Park; Attendance: 4,533; Referee: Nick Walsh |
| | Penalties |
| | Dhanda (penalty scored); Murray (penalty scored); White (penalty scored); Baldwin (penalty missed); Harmon (penalty scored); Watson (penalty missed); Sims (penalty scored) | | Muirhead (penalty scored); Holt (penalty missed); Turner (penalty scored); Graham (penalty scored); McMillan (penalty scored); Bannigan (penalty missed); Docherty (penalty missed) |
