= George Harmon (footballer) =

English footballer (born 2000)

Personal information
- Full name: George Christian Harmon
- Date of birth: 8 December 2000 (age 25)
- Place of birth: Birmingham, England
- Height: 1.78 m (5 ft 10 in)
- Positions: Left-back; left wing-back

Team information
- Current team: Cheltenham Town
- Number: 3

Youth career
- –2021: West Bromwich Albion

Senior career*
Years	Team	Apps	(Gls)
2021–2022	Oxford City	42	(7)
2022–2025	Ross County	82	(4)
2025–	Cheltenham Town	10	(0)
- * Club domestic league appearances and goals as of 20:02, 17 January 2026

George Christian Harmon (born 8 December 2000) is an English professional footballer who plays as a left-back or left wing-back for EFL League Two club Cheltenham Town.

== Club career ==
=== West Bromwich Albion ===
On 3 July 2019, Harmon signed his first professional contract with West Bromwich Albion, penning a two-year deal. On 27 May 2021, the club announced he would leave the club following the expiration of his contract.

=== Oxford City ===
On 6 August 2021, following his release from West Bromwich Albion earlier that summer, Harmon signed for National League South side Oxford City following a trial with the club. Harmon made 43 appearances for the club, scoring seven goals, and won the Supporters' Player of the Season award.

=== Ross County ===
On 22 June 2022, Harmon signed a two-year contract with Ross County. On 19 July 2022, Harmon made his first start for the club after he replaced Ben Purrington in Ross County's 2–0 victory against Alloa Athletic in the Scottish League Cup. On 6 August 2022, Harmon made his first appearance in the Scottish Premiership in a 3–1 defeat to Celtic after he replace Jordy Hiwula. He scored his first goal for the club on 5 November 2022, in a 3–2 win against St Mirren. On 17 June 2024, he signed a new two-year contract with the club.

=== Cheltenham Town ===
On 8 August 2025, Harmon returned to England, joining League Two club Cheltenham Town on a one-year deal. He made his debut for the club on 9 August 2025, in a 2–0 defeat to Chesterfield.

== Career statistics ==
As of match played 17 January 2026

Appearances and goals by club, season and competition
Club	Season	League			National Cup (Note: Includes FA Cup, Scottish Cup)		League Cup (Note: Includes Scottish League Cup, EFL Cup)		Other		Total	
Club	Season	Division	Apps	Goals	Apps	Goals	Apps	Goals	Apps	Goals	Apps	Goals
West Bromwich Albion U23	2018–19	—			—		—		3 (Note: Appearances in EFL Trophy)	0	3	0
West Bromwich Albion U23	2020–21	—			—		—		3	0	3	0
West Bromwich Albion U23	Total		0	0	0	0	0	0	6	0	6	0
Oxford City	2021–22	National League South	42	7	0	0	0	0	1 (Note: Appearances in FA Trophy)	0	43	7
Ross County	2022–23	Scottish Premiership	30	2	1	0	3	0	2 (Note: Appearances in 2022–23 Scottish Premiership play-offs)	1	36	3
Ross County	2023–24	Scottish Premiership	29	1	1	0	6	0	2 (Note: Appearances in 2023–24 Scottish Premiership play-offs)	0	38	1
Ross County	2024–25	Scottish Premiership	23	1	1	0	5	1	2 (Note: Appearances in 2024–25 Scottish Premiership play-offs)	0	31	2
Ross County	Total		82	4	3	0	14	1	6	1	105	6
Cheltenham Town	2025–26	League Two	10	0	1	0	2	0	2	0	15	0
Career total			134	11	4	0	16	1	15	1	169	13
