= Simon Murray (footballer) =

Scottish footballer (born 1992)

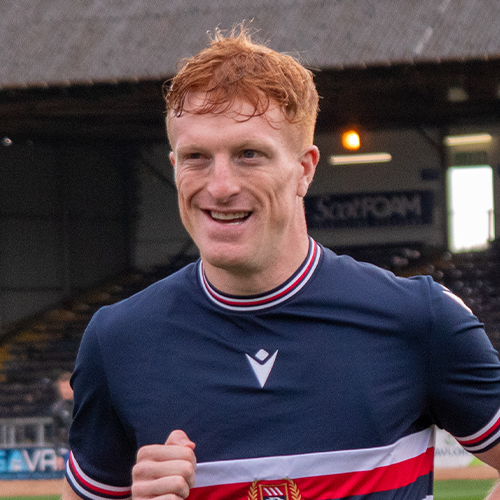
- Murray in 2024

Personal information
- Date of birth: 15 March 1992 (age 34)
- Place of birth: Dundee, Scotland
- Height: 1.82 m (6 ft 0 in)
- Position: Forward

Team information
- Current team: Dundee
- Number: 15

Youth career
- Dundee Celtic Boys Club
- Dee Club
- Dundee United Social Club
- Montrose

Senior career*
Years	Team	Apps	(Gls)
2010–2012	Montrose	1	(0)
2011	→ Downfield (loan)		
2012–2013	Tayport		
2014	Dundee Violet		
2014–2015	Arbroath	21	(14)
2015–2017	Dundee United	54	(17)
2015	→ Arbroath (loan)	15	(5)
2017–2018	Hibernian	22	(6)
2018	→ Dundee (loan)	14	(3)
2018–2020	Bidvest Wits	22	(5)
2020–2023	Queen's Park	50	(26)
2023–2024	Ross County	51	(16)
2024–	Dundee	72	(23)
- * Club domestic league appearances and goals as of 18:18, 8 August 2026 (UTC)

Simon Murray (born 22 March 1992) is a Scottish professional footballer who plays as a striker for Scottish Premiership club Dundee.

After beginning his senior career with Montrose, Murray played for several junior clubs before returning to senior football with Arbroath in 2014. He signed for Dundee United in January 2015, but initially remained with Arbroath on loan. After two seasons in the United first team, Murray moved to Hibernian in 2017. He spent the latter part of the 2017–18 season on loan at Dundee, then moved to South African club Bidvest Wits in July 2018. He returned to Scotland during 2020, when he signed for Queen's Park, with whom he would lead the side in back-to-back promotions and a rise to the Scottish Championship. He signed for Ross County in January 2023, whom he helped stay in the Premiership for two straight seasons, before returning to Dundee in 2024.

== Early life ==
Murray was born in Dundee. His father Gary Murray was also a professional footballer, playing for Montrose and Hibernian. After playing for a number of youth teams, including Dundee Celtic Boys Club, Dee Club and Dundee United Social Club, Murray joined Montrose as a youth player.

== Playing career ==
=== Early career ===
Murray began his professional career with Montrose. He made his only appearance for the first team as a substitute against Queen's Park at Hampden in May 2011. After a loan spell at Dundee-based junior club Downfield, Murray joined another junior club, Tayport, in February 2012.

After leaving Tayport, Murray spent almost a year living in Australia. On his return to Scotland, he briefly played junior football for Dundee Violet before signing for Arbroath in May 2014. Murray worked as a plumber while playing for Arbroath. After scoring 18 goals in 28 matches for Arbroath, Murray was signed by Dundee United for a £50,000 fee in January 2015. He was immediately loaned back to Arbroath for the rest of the 2014–15 season.

=== Dundee United ===
Murray made his debut for Dundee United against Aberdeen in August 2015. He scored his first goal six days later, in his first away game for United, the second goal in a 2–0 win at Motherwell. Murray scored seven goals for United in the 2015–16 season, as they were relegated to the Scottish Championship.

Murray scored a hat-trick for United in their first home game of the 2016–17 season in a 6–1 win over Cowdenbeath in the group stages of the League Cup. He scored 18 goals in all competitions for United in 2016–17. United won the 2016–17 Scottish Challenge Cup and progressed to the Premiership play-off final, but lost 1–0 on aggregate to Hamilton. Murray was sent off for two bookable offences in the first leg, but the second yellow card (and therefore the red) was appealed.

=== Hibernian ===
Soon after the play-off final defeat, Murray signed for Hibernian. He scored seven goals in his first four appearances for Hibs, in their League Cup group. He then scored on his league debut for Hibs, the third goal in a 3–1 win against Partick Thistle. On 24 October 2017, Murray scored the only goal in the Edinburgh Derby which saw Hibernian win 1–0 against Heart of Midlothian.

==== Dundee (loan) ====
On 31 January 2018, Murray moved to Dundee on loan for the remainder of the 2017–18 season.

=== Bidvest Wits ===
Hibernian sold Murray to South African club Bidvest Wits for an undisclosed fee in July 2018. Murray suffered an injury to his anterior cruciate ligament in 2019, which prevented him from playing for several months. He intimated in February 2020 that he would like to return to Scotland.

=== Queen's Park ===
After returning to Scotland, Murray joined League Two club Queen's Park in September 2020. He scored six goals in eleven appearances in his first season with the club as they were promoted as divisional champions.

On 10 September 2021, Murray was awarded with the Scottish League One Player of the Month for August 2021, having scored four goals in five games in the league for that month. He was then unavailable for much of the next six months with injury and the team struggled to win matches in his absence, drawing half of the 36 fixtures to finish in fourth place and reach the Scottish Championship play-offs. On 15 May 2022, fit-again Murray scored the winning goal from the penalty spot during extra time in the second leg of the play-off final to defeat Airdrieonians (who had finished runners-up in the regular season, 21 points ahead of Queen's Park); this secured back-to-back promotions for the Spiders, meaning they would compete in the second tier of Scottish football for the first time in nearly forty years.

On 16 June 2022, Murray signed a new one-year contract extension with Queen's Park. On 7 January 2023, Murray would net 4 goals in a single game against Cove Rangers in a 0–6 away win which would open up a 4-point gap at the top of the Scottish Championship.

=== Ross County ===
Murray signed for Scottish Premiership club Ross County on 31 January 2023 for an undisclosed fee. The same day, he would make his debut for the Staggies as a substitute in a league draw at home draw against his former club Hibernian. Murray would score a key goal as well as netting in the penalty shoot-out to help County come back against Partick Thistle in the Premiership play-off final to keep them in the top flight.

Murray would get the 2023–24 season started in style with a hat-trick away from home against Stranraer in the Scottish League Cup group stage. Murray scored 23 goals in 46 appearances for the Staggies in a standout season, including 2 goals in the Premiership play-off final against Raith Rovers to help keep County in the top tier.

=== Return to Dundee ===
On 10 July 2024, Murray returned to his boyhood club Dundee for an undisclosed fee on a three-year deal. Murray made his second debut for the club on 16 July as a substitute in an away win over another one of his former clubs, Arbroath, in the Scottish League Cup. He opened his scoring account for the Dark Blues the following week, netting a brace in a win over Annan Athletic. He followed that up with a 30 minute hat-trick in a 6–0 demolishing of Inverness Caledonian Thistle. Murray scored his first league goal for the Dee on 24 August, netting a late equaliser away to his former club Hibernian. On 20 January 2025, Murray scored the only goal in a Scottish Cup win over Dundee United to give his boyhood team their first Dundee derby win since 2017. Murray continued his derby success on 16 March, scoring a late penalty in Dundee's first win over United at Tannadice in over 20 years on the day after his birthday.

In April 2025, Murray was named as one of four nominees for the 2024–25 PFA Scotland Players' Player of the Year, alongside Celtic's Callum McGregor, Nicolas Kühn and Daizen Maeda. He was also awarded as the Scottish Premiership Player of the Month for April 2025 on the back of a key stretch of goals, having scored 8 goals in 8 league games. The following month, Murray was nominated for the Footballer of the Year award by the Scottish Football Writers' Association. At the end of the season, Murray also won the club's Andrew De Vries Player of the Year award and Players' Player of the Year award.

On 20 September 2025, Murray opened his account for the 2025–26 league season in a home win over Livingston. Murray's influence lessened in the second stint of his second season, in part due to playing on a partially torn ACL, but still finished as Dundee's top scorer with 9 goals in all competitions. On 15 August 2026, Murray suffered a significant ACL injury in a Scottish League Cup match against Aberdeen which would almost certainly rule him out for the entire 2026–27 season.

== Career statistics ==
As of match played 15 August 2026

Appearances and goals by club, season and competition
Club	Season	League			National cup (Note: Includes Scottish Cup, Nedbank Cup)		League cup (Note: Includes Scottish League Cup, MTN 8)		Other		Total	
Club	Season	Division	Apps	Goals	Apps	Goals	Apps	Goals	Apps	Goals	Apps	Goals
Montrose	2010–11	Scottish Third Division	1	0	–		–		–		1	0
Montrose	2011–12	Scottish Third Division	–		–		–		–			
Montrose	Total		1	0	–		–		–		1	0
Arbroath	2014–15	Scottish League Two	36	19	5	3	1	0	3 (Note: One appearance in Scottish Challenge Cup, two appearances and two goals in Scottish League One play-offs)	2	45	24
Dundee United	2015–16	Scottish Premiership	22	7	1	0	2	0	–		25	7
Dundee United	2016–17	Scottish Championship	32	10	1	0	6	4	11 (Note: Five appearances in Scottish Challenge Cup, six appearances and four goals in Scottish Premiership play-offs)	4	50	18
Dundee United	Total		54	17	2	0	8	4	11	4	75	25
Hibernian	2017–18	Scottish Premiership	22	6	1	0	5	8	–		28	14
Hibernian	2018–19	Scottish Premiership	–		–		–		1 (Note: Appearance in UEFA Europa League)	0	1	0
Hibernian	Total		22	6	1	0	5	8	1	0	29	14
Dundee (loan)	2017–18	Scottish Premiership	14	3	–		–		–		14	3
Bidvest Wits	2018–19	South African Premier Division	21	5	3	2	3	1	–		27	8
Bidvest Wits	2019–20	South African Premier Division	1	0	0	0	0	0	–		1	0
Bidvest Wits	Total		22	5	3	!2	3	1	0	0	28	8
Queen's Park	2020–21	Scottish League Two	10	6	1	0	0	0	–		11	6
Queen's Park	2021–22	Scottish League One	18	5	0	0	4	1	6 (Note: Two appearances in Scottish Challenge Cup, four appearances and three goals in Scottish Championship play-offs)	3	28	9
Queen's Park	2022–23	Scottish Championship	22	15	1	0	4	3	1 (Note: Appearance(s) in Scottish Challenge Cup)	0	28	18
Queen's Park	Total		50	26	2	0	8	4	7	3	67	33
Ross County	2022–23	Scottish Premiership	14	2	–		–		2 (Note: Appearances in Scottish Premiership play-offs)	1	16	3
Ross County	2023–24	Scottish Premiership	37	14	1	0	6	7	2 (Note: Appearances in Scottish Premiership play-offs)	2	46	23
Ross County	Total		51	16	1	0	6	7	4	3	62	25
Dundee	2024–25	Scottish Premiership	38	16	3	1	5	5	0	0	46	22
Dundee	2025–26	Scottish Premiership	32	7	2	0	4	2	0	0	38	9
Dundee	2026–27	Scottish Premiership	2	0	0	0	5	2	0	0	7	2
Dundee	Total		72	23	5	1	14	9	0	0	91	33
Career total			322	115	19	6	45	33	26	12	414	166

== Honours ==
Dundee United

- Scottish Challenge Cup: 2016–17

Queen's Park

- Scottish League Two: 2020–21

Individual

- Scottish League One Player of the Month: August 2021
- Scottish Premiership Player of the Month: April 2025
- PFA Scotland Players' Player of the Year nominee: 2024–25
- SFWA Footballer of the Year nominee: 2024–25
- Andrew De Vries Player of the Year winner: 2024–25
- Dundee Players' Player of the Year winner: 2024–25
