= Matthew Wright (Scottish footballer) =

Scottish Footballer

Personal information
- Date of birth: 16 October 2002 (age 24)
- Place of birth: Stornoway, Scotland
- Position: Forward

Team information
- Current team: Strathspey Thistle

Youth career
- –2018: Point
- 2018–2020: Ross County

Senior career*
Years	Team	Apps	(Gls)
2020–2024	Ross County	6	(1)
2021–2022	→ Brora Rangers (loan)	15	(15)
2022	→ Montrose (loan)	17	(6)
2023	→ Falkirk (loan)	10	(1)
2023–2024	→ Elgin City (loan)	6	(1)
2024	→ Brechin City (loan)	13	(3)
2024–2025	Nairn County	17	(7)
2025	Brora Rangers	11	(6)
2025–	Strathspey Thistle	0	(0)
- * Club domestic league appearances and goals as of 11 October 2025

Matthew Wright (born 16 October 2002) is a Scottish professional footballer who plays as a forward for Highland League club Strathspey Thistle. He has also played for Montrose, Falkirk, Elgin City, Nairn County, Brora Rangers and Brechin.

== Career ==
=== Ross County ===
Wright signed a two-year deal with Ross County on 30 May 2018 having played youth football with Point F.C. in the Western Isles. On 6 December 2020 Wright came off the bench against Rangers for his Scottish Premiership Debut. On return to Ross County in January 2022, Wright scored a 96th-minute equaliser against Rangers, which was his first Scottish Premiership goal.

==== Brora Rangers (loan) ====
On 11 August 2021 after appearing for Ross County in the Scottish League Cup against Montrose Wright was sent on loan to Highland Football League side Brora Rangers until January 2022.

==== Falkirk (loan) ====
On 26 January 2023, Wright joined Scottish League One club Falkirk on loan until the end of the season.

==== Elgin City (loan) ====
In August 2023, Wright joined Scottish League Two club Elgin City on loan.

==== Nairn County ====
On 14 June 2024, Wright signed a two-year deal with Highland League club, Nairn County.

==== Return to Brora ====
On 24 January 2025, Wright joined Highland League club Brora Rangers after a short spell with Nairn. On 9 July 2025 it was announced that Wright would be taking a break from football ahead of the 25–26 season.

Strathspey Thistle

On 9 October 2025, Wright joined Highland League club, Strathspey Thistle on a three-year deal.

== Career statistics ==
As of match played 13 May 2023

Appearances and goals by club, season and competition
Club	Season	League			Cup		League Cup		Other		Total	
Club	Season	Division	Apps	Goals	Apps	Goals	Apps	Goals	Apps	Goals	Apps	Goals
Ross County	2020–21	Scottish Premiership	2	0	0	0	1	0	—		3	0
Ross County	2021–22	Scottish Premiership	4	1	0	0	1	0	—		5	1
Ross County	2022–23	Scottish Premiership	0	0	0	0	0	0	—		0	0
Ross County	Total		6	1	0	0	2	0	0	0	8	1
Brora Rangers (loan)	2021–22	Highland Football League	15	15	3	2	1	1	3 (Note: Appearances in the North of Scotland Cup)	2	22	20
Montrose (loan)	2022–23	Scottish League One	17	6	0	0	0	0	2 (Note: Appearances in the Scottish Challenge Cup)	0	19	6
Falkirk (loan)	2022–23	Scottish League One	10	1	3	0	0	0	1	0	14	1
Career total			48	23	6	2	3	1	6	2	63	28
