= Owen Beck =

Owen Beck may refer to:

- Owen Beck (boxer) (born 1976), Jamaican professional boxer
- Owen Beck (footballer) (born 2002), Welsh footballer
- Owen Beck (ice hockey) (born 2004), Canadian ice hockey player
