= Jordan White (footballer) =

Scottish footballer (born 1992)

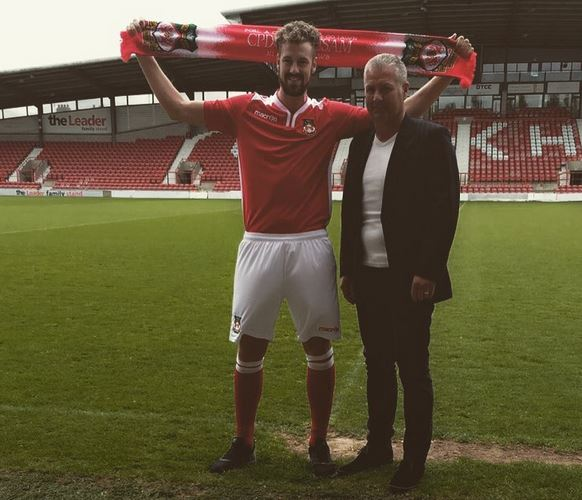

Personal information
- Full name: Jordan Neil White
- Date of birth: 4 February 1992 (age 34)
- Place of birth: Bellshill, Scotland
- Height: 1.93 m (6 ft 4 in)
- Position: Striker

Team information
- Current team: Ross County
- Number: 26

Youth career
- Rangers
- Hibernian
- 2006–2011: Dunfermline

Senior career*
Years	Team	Apps	(Gls)
2009–2011	Dunfermline Athletic	0	(0)
2009–2010	→ Clyde (loan)	20	(4)
2011	→ Dumbarton (loan)	8	(0)
2011	Drogheda United	13	(1)
2011	Clyde	6	(1)
2012	Falkirk	13	(0)
2012–2014	Stirling Albion	65	(29)
2014–2016	Livingston	69	(21)
2016–2017	Wrexham	24	(7)
2017–2018	Barrow	44	(7)
2018–2020	Inverness Caledonian Thistle	62	(14)
2020–2021	Motherwell	18	(0)
2021–2026	Ross County	198	(36)
2026–	Cove Rangers	0	(0)
- * Club domestic league appearances and goals as of 24 June 2026

Jordan Neil White (born 4 February 1992) is a Scottish professional footballer who plays as a striker for Scottish League One club Cove Rangers.

== Career ==
=== Dunfermline Athletic ===
Born in Bellshill, White began his professional career with Dunfermline Athletic, signing a full-time contract with the Fife side in June 2008, making his senior début aged only 16 in a friendly match against Hearts on 16 July 2008. He made his competitive senior début on 18 August 2009, in a Scottish Challenge Cup tie against Queen of the South. White was awarded the Dunfermline Athletic Under-19 Player of the Year Award for the 2009–10 season.

=== Loan periods ===
White signed on loan for Clyde in November 2009. He scored his first senior goal in a 2–2 draw with Alloa Athletic on 6 March 2010. He had previously netted on 7 December 2009 in a Scottish Cup tie against Livingston, but the goal did not officially count as the game was abandoned due to heavy fog. White made 22 competitive appearances, the majority in right midfield for Clyde, scoring four goals in the 2009–10 season.

White signed on loan for Dumbarton in March 2011, for the remainder of the 2010–11 season. He made eight competitive appearances for Dumbarton.

=== Drogheda United ===
White was invited on trial with League of Ireland Premier Division club Drogheda United in June 2011. He was offered a contract until the end of the season, after impressing manager Mick Cooke by scoring in a friendly against Dundee United at United Park on Sunday 26 June 2011. He made 15 competitive appearances for Drogheda United scoring two goals in the 2011 season.

=== Clyde ===
On his return to Scotland from Ireland White re-signed for Clyde on 2 December 2011. He made six competitive appearances for Clyde scoring one goal in the 2011–12 season.

=== Falkirk ===
During his second spell with Clyde, White caught the eye of then Falkirk manager Steven Pressley. He was invited to train with the club for a week and after impressing the manager he was offered an 18-month contract in January 2012. White scored two goals for Falkirk in a 3–0 victory against Stenhousemuir in the Stirlingshire Cup on 4 September 2012.

=== Stirling Albion ===
On 21 September 2012, White went out on loan to Stirling Albion for three months. A day later he scored on his début for his new club against Berwick Rangers. White was also impressive in the historical 1–0 defeat of Rangers on 6 October 2012.

Due to cuts behind the scenes at Falkirk, on 1 January 2013, White agreed to join Stirling Albion on a permanent deal. Manager Greig McDonald was delighted to add White to his squad, while Falkirk manager Steven Pressley said White had been a model professional during his time with the club. He scored his first senior hat-trick by scoring four goals in a 9–1 victory against East Stirlingshire on 9 March 2013, which is currently the club's biggest league win in their history. In the 2012–13 season White scored 15 goals and had 11 assists from 30 appearances which led to him scooping three club awards; Players Player of the Year, Club Player of the Year and Top Goalscorer.

In the 2013–14 season White made 45 appearances, scored 24 goals and had 12 assists which for the second year in a row saw him win the Stirling Albion Players Player of the Year, Club Player of the Year and Top Goalscorer Awards. In his 20 months with the club White made 77 appearances, starting in 75, scored 39 goals including two hat-tricks, and had 23 assists.

=== Livingston ===
On 4 July 2014, White signed a two-year deal with Livingston. He scored the winner on his home league debut against Cowdenbeath on 16 August 2014. White scored the third hat-trick of his career and first for Livingston on 13 September 2014, versus Alloa Athletic. In the Challenge Cup semi-final against Stranraer, White scored one of the penalties in the shootout to take Livingston into the Final. He also scored two goals in the final to help his club win 4–0 against Alloa Athletic on 5 April 2015. The club were in a relegation battle during his first season and White was instrumental in galvanising the team's safety by scoring two goals against Cowdenbeath on 11 April 2015, when they were losing the game with only 25 minutes remaining, most fans feel that White saved their season by his performance that day. This result helped the club to achieve 13 points in the final 6 games of the season which secured their future in the Scottish Championship. White made 44 appearances and was the club's top goalscorer with 15 goals and six assists from 33 starts in season 2014–15.

White continued his good form into the 2015–16 season, scoring 16 goals and six assists from 33 starts, and in total scored 31 goals and had 12 assists from 66 starts in his Livingston career. His second season with the club ended with White being captain of the team and winning three Club Awards, Players Player of Year, Top Goalscorer and Goal of Season.

=== Wrexham ===
White signed for Wrexham on 20 May 2016, stating that it was "an easy decision to join Wrexham". However, during pre-season, he was hospitalised after being diagnosed with a problem with his bloodstream and was ruled out for two months. Wrexham manager Gary Mills commented that White had been left "more or less paralysed" by the problem for a time. After being out for the first four months of the season, and not having played a competitive game since 7 May due to his illness, he made his debut on 29 November 2016. On 1 January 2017, White scored his first goal for his new club in his third league start. He ended the season with seven goals, making him the club's second top goalscorer for the 2016–17 season. Two days after the final game of the season, it was revealed that White's contract would not be renewed and he would be leaving the club in the summer of 2017. In his time with the club he made 16 starts, one of which was in the centre half position, and scored 7 goals.

=== Barrow ===
White signed a one-year contract with fellow National League side Barrow on 23 May 2017. In his time at the club White started 22 league games and scored 7 goals.

=== Inverness Caledonian Thistle ===
White signed for Scottish Championship club Inverness Caledonian Thistle during the 2018 close season. On 29 December 2018, White scored his 100th career goal in the Highland derby against Ross County. He ended the season as the club's top goalscorer, with 16 goals from 40 starts.

White was also sitting as the club's top scorer with 10 goals from 31 starts in season 2019–20 before the season was stopped on 13 March due to the outbreak of the COVID19 virus. He departed the club on 12 June 2020, after he signed for Motherwell.

=== Motherwell ===
White signed for Scottish Premiership club Motherwell on 12 June 2020, he was the club's second new signing during the close season. During his time with the club White made twenty appearances, but only three starts, failing to score in any of them.

=== Ross County ===
On 28 January 2021, White joined Scottish Premiership side Ross County on a permanent contract until the end of the 2020–21 season. White scored for County in wins against Hamilton and Celtic in February 2021, the latter of which lifted County out of the relegation places. On 8 March 2022 White signed a new contract with County keeping him at the club until 2024.

== Career statistics ==
As of match played 4 May 2026

Club	Season	League			National cup		League cup		Other		Total	
Club	Season	Division	Apps	Goals	Apps	Goals	Apps	Goals	Apps	Goals	Apps	Goals
Dunfermline Athletic	2009–10	Scottish First Division	0	0	0	0	0	0	1	0	1	0
Clyde (loan)	2009–10	Scottish Second Division	20	4	2	0	0	0	0	0	22	4
Dumbarton (loan)	2010–11	Scottish Second Division	8	0	0	0	0	0	0	0	8	0
Drogheda United	2011	LOI Premier Division	13	1	2	1	0	0	0	0	15	2
Clyde	2011–12	Scottish Third Division	6	1	0	0	0	0	0	0	6	1
Falkirk	2011–12	Scottish First Division	10	0	1	0	1	0	0	0	12	0
Falkirk	2012–13	Scottish First Division	3	0	0	0	0	0	1	0	4	0
Falkirk	Total		13	0	1	0	1	0	1	0	16	0
Stirling Albion	2012–13	Scottish Third Division	29	13	2	2	0	0	0	0	31	15
Stirling Albion	2013–14	Scottish Third Division	36	16	4	3	1	0	5 (Note: One appearance and one goal in Scottish Challenge Cup, four appearances and four goals in Scottish Second Division promotion play-offs)	5	46	24
Stirling Albion	Total		65	29	6	5	1	0	5	5	77	39
Livingston	2014–15	Scottish Championship	35	11	1	0	3	0	5 (Note: Appearances in Scottish Challenge Cup)	4	44	15
Livingston	2015–16	Scottish Championship	34	10	2	2	3	1	5 (Note: Three appearances and one goal in Scottish Challenge Cup, two appearances and two goals in Scottish Premiership promotion play-offs)	3	44	16
Livingston	Total		69	21	3	2	6	1	10	7	88	31
Wrexham	2016–17	National League	24	7	0	0	—		1 (Note: Appearance(s) in FA Trophy)	0	25	7
Barrow	2017–18	National League	44	7	1	0	—		3	0	48	7
Inverness Caledonian Thistle	2018–19	Scottish Championship	36	7	7	6	4	0	5 (Note: One appearance and one goal in Scottish Challenge Cup, four appearances and two goals in Scottish Premiership promotion play-offs)	3	52	16
Inverness Caledonian Thistle	2019–20	Scottish Championship	26	7	3	1	4	2	4	0	37	10
Inverness Caledonian Thistle	Total		62	14	10	7	8	2	9	3	89	26
Motherwell	2020–21	Scottish Premiership	18	0	0	0	1	0	1 (Note: Appearance in UEFA Europa League)	0	20	0
Ross County	2020–21	Scottish Premiership	12	4	1	0	0	0	—		13	4
Ross County	2021–22	Scottish Premiership	38	5	1	0	2	1	—		41	6
Ross County	2022–23	Scottish Premiership	38	11	1	0	4	0	2 (Note: Appearances in Scottish Premiership play-offs)	0	45	11
Ross County	2023–24	Scottish Premiership	38	5	1	0	6	2	2	1	47	8
Ross County	2024–25	Scottish Premiership	37	6	1	1	5	4	2	0	45	11
Ross County	2025–26	Scottish Championship	35	5	2	1	3	1	2	0	42	7
Ross County	Total		198	36	7	2	20	8	8	1	233	47
Career total			540	120	32	17	37	11	38	16	648	164

== Honours ==
=== Club ===
Falkirk

- Scottish Challenge Cup: 2011–12

Livingston

- Scottish Challenge Cup: 2014–15

=== Individual ===
- Dunfermline Athletic Under-19s Player of the Year: 2009–10
- Stirling Albion Player of the Year: 2012–13, 2013–14
- Stirling Albion Players Player of the Year: 2012–13, 2013–14
- Livingston Players Player of the Year: 2015–16
