= 2023–24 Scottish Premiership =

118th season of top-tier football league in Scotland

Scottish Premiership
- Season: 2023–24
- Dates: 5 August 2023 – 19 May 2024
- Champions: Celtic; 10th Premiership title 54th Scottish title
- Relegated: Livingston
- Champions League: Celtic; Rangers
- Europa League: Heart of Midlothian; Kilmarnock
- Conference League: St Mirren
- Matches: 228
- Goals: 629 (2.76 per match)
- Top goalscorer: Lawrence Shankland (24 goals)
- Biggest home win: Celtic 6–0 Aberdeen (12 November 2023); Celtic 7–1 Dundee (28 February 2024)
- Biggest away win: Dundee 0–5 Rangers (1 November 2023); Kilmarnock 0–5 Celtic (15 May 2024)
- Highest scoring: Celtic 7–1 Dundee (28 February 2024)
- Longest winning run: Rangers (9 games)
- Longest unbeaten run: Celtic (16 games)
- Longest winless run: Livingston (17 games)
- Longest losing run: Livingston (8 games)
- Highest attendance: 59,664; Celtic 2–1 Rangers (30 December 2023)
- Lowest attendance: 1,142; Livingston 2–2 Ross County (30 January 2024)
- Total attendance: 3,716,679
- Average attendance: 16,301

The 2023–24 Scottish Premiership (known as the cinch Premiership for sponsorship reasons) was the eleventh season of the Scottish Premiership, the highest division of Scottish football, and the 127th edition overall of the top national league competition, not including one cancelled due to World War II. The season began on 5 August 2023.

Twelve teams contested the league: Aberdeen, Celtic, Dundee, Heart of Midlothian, Hibernian, Kilmarnock, Livingston, Motherwell, Rangers, Ross County, St Johnstone and St Mirren.

On 15 May 2024, Celtic successfully defended their title, securing a tenth Premiership title and 54th Scottish league title overall, following a 5–0 victory away to Kilmarnock.

== Teams ==
The following teams changed division after the 2022–23 season.

Promoted from the Championship

- Dundee

Relegated to the Championship

- Dundee United

=== Stadia and locations ===
Aberdeen	Celtic	Dundee	Heart of Midlothian
Pittodrie Stadium	Celtic Park	Dens Park	Tynecastle Park
Capacity: 20,866	Capacity: 60,411	Capacity: 11,775	Capacity: 19,852
Hibernian	Location of teams in the 2023–24 Scottish Premiership		Kilmarnock
Easter Road	Location of teams in the 2023–24 Scottish Premiership		Rugby Park
Capacity: 20,421	Location of teams in the 2023–24 Scottish Premiership		Capacity: 15,003
Livingston	Location of teams in the 2023–24 Scottish Premiership		Motherwell
Almondvale Stadium	Location of teams in the 2023–24 Scottish Premiership		Fir Park
Capacity: 9,713	Location of teams in the 2023–24 Scottish Premiership		Capacity: 13,677
Rangers	Ross County	St Johnstone	St Mirren
Ibrox Stadium	Victoria Park	McDiarmid Park	St Mirren Park
Capacity: 50,987	Capacity: 6,541	Capacity: 10,696	Capacity: 7,937

Premiership football clubs in Edinburgh
Premiership football clubs in Glasgow

=== Personnel and kits ===
Team	Manager	Captain	Kit manufacturer	Shirt sponsor
Aberdeen	(Scotland) Peter Leven (Interim)	(Scotland) Graeme Shinnie	Adidas	TEXO
Celtic	(Northern Ireland) Brendan Rodgers	(Scotland) Callum McGregor	Adidas	Dafabet
Dundee	(Scotland) Tony Docherty	(Republic of Ireland) Joe Shaughnessy	Macron	Crown Engineering Services
Heart of Midlothian	(Scotland) Steven Naismith	(Scotland) Craig Gordon	Umbro	MND Scotland (Home); Stellar Omada (Away)
Hibernian	(Scotland) David Gray (Interim)	(Scotland) Paul Hanlon	Joma	Bevvy.com
Kilmarnock	(Scotland) Derek McInnes	(Northern Ireland) Kyle Vassell	Hummel	James Frew Ltd
Livingston	(Scotland) David Martindale	(Scotland) Mikey Devlin	Joma	Emptez
Motherwell	(Scotland) Stuart Kettlewell	(Scotland) Liam Kelly	Macron	G4 Claims
Rangers	(Belgium) Philippe Clement	(England) James Tavernier	Castore	Unibet
Ross County	(Scotland) Don Cowie (Interim)	(England) Jack Baldwin	Joma	Ross-shire Engineering
St Johnstone	(Scotland) Craig Levein	(Scotland) Liam Gordon	Macron	GS Brown Construction
St Mirren	(Northern Ireland) Stephen Robinson	(Scotland) Mark O'Hara	Macron	Digby Brown

=== Managerial changes ===
Team	Outgoing manager	Manner of departure	Date of vacancy	Position in table	Incoming manager	Date of appointment
Dundee	(England) Gary Bowyer	End of contract	10 May 2023	Pre-season	(Scotland) Tony Docherty	29 May 2023
Celtic	(Australia) Ange Postecoglou	JoinedTottenham Hotspur	6 June 2023	Pre-season	(Northern Ireland) Brendan Rodgers	19 June 2023
Hibernian	(England) Lee Johnson	Sacked	27 August 2023	12th	(Scotland) Nick Montgomery	11 September 2023
Rangers	(England) Michael Beale	Sacked	1 October 2023	3rd	(Belgium) Philippe Clement	15 October 2023
St Johnstone	(Scotland) Steven MacLean	Sacked	29 October 2023	12th	(Scotland) Craig Levein	5 November 2023
Ross County	(Scotland) Malky Mackay	Sacked	15 November 2023	11th	(Scotland) Derek Adams	20 November 2023
Aberdeen	(Scotland) Barry Robson	Sacked	31 January 2024	8th	(England) Neil Warnock	5 February 2024
Ross County	(Scotland) Derek Adams	Resigned	7 February 2024	11th	(Scotland) Don Cowie (Interim)	8 February 2024
Aberdeen	(England) Neil Warnock	Resigned	9 March 2024	10th	(Scotland) Peter Leven (Interim)	9 March 2024
Hibernian	(Scotland) Nick Montgomery	Sacked	14 May 2024	9th	(Scotland) David Gray (Interim)	14 May 2024

== Format ==
In the initial phase of the season, the 12 teams play a round-robin tournament whereby each team plays each of the other teams three times. After 33 games, the league splits into two sections of six teams, with each team playing each other once in that section. The league attempts to balance the fixture list so that teams in the same section play each other twice at home and twice away, but sometimes this is impossible. A total of 228 matches were played, with 38 matches played by each team.

== League table ==
Pos	Team	Pld	W	D	L	GF	GA	GD	Pts	Qualification or relegation (Note: Teams play each other three times (33 matches), before the league is split into two groups (the top six and the bottom six).)
1	Celtic (C)	38	29	6	3	95	30	+65	93	Qualification for the Champions League league stage
2	Rangers	38	27	4	7	87	32	+55	85	Qualification for the Champions League third qualifying round
3	Heart of Midlothian	38	20	8	10	54	42	+12	68	Qualification for the Europa League play-off round (Note: As the winners of the 2023–24 Scottish Cup, Celtic, qualified for the Champions League, the berth reserved for the cup winners (Europa League play-off round) passed to the third-placed team. The berths for the Europa League second qualifying round and the Conference League second qualifying round were passed down to the fourth- and fifth-placed teams.)
4	Kilmarnock	38	14	14	10	46	44	+2	56	Qualification for the Europa League second qualifying round
5	St Mirren	38	13	8	17	46	52	−6	47	Qualification for the Conference League second qualifying round
6	Dundee	38	10	12	16	49	68	−19	42	
7	Aberdeen	38	12	12	14	48	52	−4	48	
8	Hibernian	38	11	13	14	52	59	−7	46	
9	Motherwell	38	10	13	15	56	59	−3	43	
10	St Johnstone	38	8	11	19	29	54	−25	35	
11	Ross County (O)	38	8	11	19	38	67	−29	35	Qualification for the Premiership play-off final
12	Livingston (R)	38	5	10	23	29	70	−41	25	Relegation to Championship

Rules for classification: 1) Points; 2) Goal difference; 3) Goals scored; 4) Head-to-Head points; 5) Head-to-Head goal difference; 6) Play-off (only if deciding champion, UEFA competitions qualification, second stage group allocation or relegation).
(C) Champions; (O) Play-off winners; (R) Relegated

== Results ==
=== Matches 1–22 ===
Teams played each other twice, once at home and once away.

Home \ Away	ABE	CEL	DND	HOM	HIB	KIL	LIV	MOT	RAN	ROS	STJ	STM
Aberdeen	—	1–3	1–1	2–1	0–2	0–1	2–1	3–3	1–1	4–0	0–0	0–3
Celtic	6–0	—	3–0	0–2	4–1	3–1	2–0	1–1	2–1	4–2	0–0	2–1
Dundee	1–0	0–3	—	1–0	1–2	2–2	1–0	1–1	0–5	0–0	2–1	4–0
Heart of Midlothian	2–0	1–4	3–2	—	2–2	0–0	1–0	0–1	0–1	2–2	1–0	2–0
Hibernian	2–0	0–0	0–0	0–1	—	1–0	2–3	2–2	0–3	2–2	2–0	2–3
Kilmarnock	2–0	2–1	2–2	0–1	2–2	—	3–1	1–0	1–0	0–1	2–1	1–1
Livingston	0–0	0–3	0–2	1–2	0–1	0–0	—	2–0	0–2	2–2	0–0	1–1
Motherwell	2–4	1–2	3–3	1–2	2–1	2–1	3–1	—	0–2	3–3	1–1	0–1
Rangers	1–3	0–1	3–1	2–1	4–0	3–1	4–0	1–0	—	3–1	2–0	2–0
Ross County	0–3	0–3	0–1	0–1	2–2	0–0	1–1	3–0	0–2	—	2–0	1–0
St Johnstone	1–1	1–3	2–2	0–2	1–0	2–1	1–1	2–2	0–2	1–0	—	1–0
St Mirren	2–2	0–3	2–1	1–0	2–2	0–1	1–0	0–0	0–3	2–0	4–0	—

Legend: Blue = home team win; Yellow = draw; Red = away team win.

=== Matches 23–33 ===
Teams played each other once, either home or away.

Home \ Away	ABE	CEL	DND	HOM	HIB	KIL	LIV	MOT	RAN	ROS	STJ	STM
Aberdeen	—	1–1	0–0	—	2–2	—	—	—	—	2–1	0–2	—
Celtic	—	—	7–1	—	—	1–1	—	—	—	1–0	3–1	3–0
Dundee	—	—	—	2–3	—	2–2	—	2–3	0–0	2–0	—	—
Heart of Midlothian	2–0	2–0	—	—	1–1	1–1	4–2	2–0	—	—	—	—
Hibernian	—	1–2	2–1	—	—	—	3–0	—	—	2–0	1–2	0–3
Kilmarnock	2–0	—	—	—	2–2	—	1–0	—	1–2	1–0	—	5–2
Livingston	0–0	0–3	1–4	—	—	—	—	1–3	—	—	—	1–0
Motherwell	0–1	1–3	—	—	1–1	1–1	—	—	—	5–0	—	1–1
Rangers	2–1	3–3	—	5–0	3–1	—	3–0	1–2	—	—	—	—
Ross County	—	—	—	2–1	—	—	3–2	—	3–2	—	0–1	1–1
St Johnstone	—	—	1–2	0–1	—	0–2	1–1	1–1	0–3	—	—	—
St Mirren	2–1	—	2–0	1–2	—	—	—	—	0–1	—	2–0	—

Legend: Blue = home team win; Yellow = draw; Red = away team win.

=== Matches 34–38 ===
After 33 matches, the league was split into two sections of six teams, i.e. the top six and the bottom six, with the teams playing every other team in their section once (either at home or away). The exact matches were determined by the position of the teams in the league table at the time of the split.

==== Top six ====
Home \ Away	CEL	DND	HOM	KIL	RAN	STM
Celtic	—	—	3–0	—	2–1	3–2
Dundee	1–2	—	—	1–1	—	1–3
Heart of Midlothian	—	3–0	—	—	3–3	—
Kilmarnock	0–5	—	0–0	—	—	—
Rangers	—	5–2	—	4–1	—	—
St Mirren	—	—	2–2	0–1	1–2	—

Legend: Blue = home team win; Yellow = draw; Red = away team win.

==== Bottom six ====
Home \ Away	ABE	HIB	LIV	MOT	ROS	STJ
Aberdeen	—	—	5–1	1–0	—	1–0
Hibernian	0–4	—	—	3–0	—	—
Livingston	—	1–1	—	—	2–0	2–1
Motherwell	—	—	4–1	—	—	1–2
Ross County	2–2	2–1	—	1–5	—	—
St Johnstone	—	1–3	—	—	1–1	—

Legend: Blue = home team win; Yellow = draw; Red = away team win.

== Season statistics ==
=== Top scorers ===
Rank	Player	Club	Goals
1	(Scotland) Lawrence Shankland	Heart of Midlothian	24
2	(Denmark) Matt O'Riley	Celtic	18
3	(England) James Tavernier	Rangers	17
4	(Nigeria) Cyriel Dessers	Rangers	16
4	(North Macedonia) Bojan Miovski	Aberdeen	16
6	(Canada) Theo Bair	Motherwell	15
7	(Japan) Kyōgo Furuhashi	Celtic	14
7	(Scotland) Simon Murray	Ross County	14
9	(Senegal) Abdallah Sima	Rangers	11
10	(Comoros) Myziane Maolida	Hibernian	10
10	(Scotland) Luke McCowan	Dundee	10

=== Clean sheets ===
Rank	Player	Club	Clean sheets
1	(England) Jack Butland	Rangers	18
2	(Scotland) Zander Clark	Heart of Midlothian	15
2	(England) Joe Hart	Celtic	15
4	(England) Will Dennis	Kilmarnock	14
5	(England) Zach Hemming	St Mirren	10
5	(Netherlands) Kelle Roos	Aberdeen	10
7	(Scotland) David Marshall	Hibernian	9
8	(Northern Ireland) Trevor Carson	Dundee	8
8	(Bulgaria) Dimitar Mitov	St Johnstone	8
10	(England) Shamal George	Livingston	7

== Awards ==
Month	Manager of the Month		Player of the Month	
Month	Manager	Club	Player	Club
August	(Northern Ireland) Stephen Robinson	St Mirren	(Australia) Ryan Strain	St Mirren
September	(Northern Ireland) Brendan Rodgers	Celtic	(Denmark) Matt O'Riley	Celtic
October	(Scotland) Derek McInnes	Kilmarnock	(Senegal) Abdallah Sima	Rangers
November	(Scotland) Steven Naismith	Heart of Midlothian	(Scotland) Lawrence Shankland	Heart of Midlothian
December	(Scotland) Derek McInnes	Kilmarnock	(Scotland) Lawrence Shankland	Heart of Midlothian
January	(Belgium) Philippe Clement	Rangers	(Scotland) Alan Forrest	Heart of Midlothian
February	(Belgium) Philippe Clement	Rangers	(Scotland) Blair Spittal	Motherwell
March	(Scotland) Tony Docherty	Dundee	(Comoros) Myziane Maolida	Hibernian
April	(Northern Ireland) Brendan Rodgers	Celtic	(Scotland) Luke McCowan	Dundee

The SPFL Premiership manager of the year was Derek McInnes of Kilmarnock.

The SPFL Premiership player of the year was Lawrence Shankland of Heart of Midlothian.

=== Annual awards ===
Award	Winner	Club
Scottich Premiership Player of the Year	(Scotland) Lawrence Shankland	Heart of Midlothian
PFA Scotland Premiership Player of the Year	(Scotland) Lawrence Shankland	Heart of Midlothian
PFA Scotland SPFL Young Player of the Year	(Scotland) David Watson	Kilmarnock
PFA Scotland SPFL Manager of the Year	(Scotland) John McGlynn	Falkirk
PFA Scotland Goal of the Season	(England) Rabbi Matondo	Rangers
SFWA Player of the Year	(Scotland) Lawrence Shankland	Heart of Midlothian

PFA Scotland Team of the Year
Goalkeeper	(England) Jack Butland (Rangers)			
Defenders	(England) James Tavernier (Rangers)	(United States) Cameron Carter-Vickers (Celtic)	(Republic of Ireland) Liam Scales (Celtic)	(England) Owen Beck (Dundee)
Midfielders	(Denmark) Matt O'Riley (Celtic)		(England) John Lundstram (Rangers)	(Scotland) Callum McGregor (Celtic)
Forwards	(North Macedonia) Bojan Miovski (Aberdeen)		(Scotland) Lawrence Shankland (Heart of Midlothian)	(Canada) Theo Bair (Motherwell)

== Premiership play-offs ==
The quarter-final was contested by the teams placed third and fourth in the 2023–24 Scottish Championship, Partick Thistle and Airdrieonians. Partick Thistle advanced to the semi-final to face the team placed second in the Championship, Raith Rovers. The final was contested by Raith Rovers and the team placed eleventh in the Premiership, Ross County, who won the tie to secure a place in the 2024–25 Scottish Premiership.

=== Qualified teams ===
Team	Rank
Ross County	1
Raith Rovers	2
Partick Thistle	3
Airdrieonians	4

Quarter-final
3	Partick Thistle	2	2	4
4	Airdrieonians	2	1	3

Semi-final
2	Raith Rovers	2	1	3 (4)
3	Partick Thistle	1	2	3 (3)

Final
1	Ross County	2	4	6
2	Raith Rovers	1	0	1

=== Quarter-final ===
==== First leg ====
7 May 2024	Airdrieonians	2–2	Partick Thistle	Airdrie
19:45	Todorov 5'; McGill 50'		McBeth 29'; Robinson 45'	Stadium: Excelsior Stadium; Attendance: 3,163; Referee: Grant Irvine

==== Second leg ====
10 May 2024	Partick Thistle	2–1 (4–3 agg.)	Airdrieonians	Glasgow
19:45	Graham 18', 47'		Lyall 55'	Stadium: Firhill Stadium; Attendance: 6,531; Referee: Colin Steven

=== Semi-final ===
==== First leg ====
14 May 2024	Partick Thistle	1–2	Raith Rovers	Glasgow
19:45	Alston 73'		Brown 22'; Vaughan 40'	Stadium: Firhill Stadium; Attendance: 5,497; Referee: Chris Graham

==== Second leg ====
17 May 2024	Raith Rovers	1–2 (a.e.t.) (3–3 agg.) (4–3 p)	Partick Thistle	Kirkcaldy
19:45	Matthews 30'		Alston 16', 45+1'	Stadium: Stark's Park; Attendance: 6,070; Referee: Steven McLean
	Penalties
	Brown (penalty missed); Turner (penalty scored); Hamilton (penalty scored); Easton (penalty scored); Vaughan (penalty scored)		(penalty scored) Stanway; (penalty scored) McBeth; (penalty scored) Graham; (penalty missed) McMillan; (penalty missed) Diack

=== Final ===
==== First leg ====
23 May 2024	Raith Rovers	1–2	Ross County	Kirkcaldy
20:00	Stanton 82'		Dhanda 53' (pen.); Baldwin 71'	Stadium: Stark's Park; Attendance: 6,216; Referee: John Beaton

==== Second leg ====
26 May 2024	Ross County	4–0 (6–1 agg.)	Raith Rovers	Dingwall
12:00	Murray 19', 75'; White 47'; Khela 86'			Stadium: Victoria Park; Attendance: 5,797; Referee: Don Robertson

== Attendances ==
Celtic FC drew the highest average home attendance in the 2023-24 edition of the Scottish Premiership.

#	Football club	Home games	Average attendance
1	Celtic FC	19	58,827
2	Rangers FC	19	49,141
3	Heart of Midlothian	19	18,406
4	Hibernian FC	19	16,808
5	Aberdeen FC	19	16,055
6	Dundee FC	19	6,965
7	St. Mirren FC	19	6,646
8	Kilmarnock FC	19	6,523
9	Motherwell FC	19	5,699
10	St. Johnstone FC	19	4,547
11	Ross County FC	19	4,302
12	Livingston FC	19	3,582
