= 2026–27 Ross County F.C. season =

Ross County
2026–27 season
- Chairman: Roy MacGregor
- Manager: Stuart Kettlewell
- Ground: Victoria Park; Dingwall, Ross-shire (Capacity: 6,541)
- Scottish Cup: Third round
- League Cup: Quarter–finals
- Challenge Cup: Third round
- Top goalscorer: League: Brian Graham (16); All: Brian Graham (21)
- Highest home attendance: 2,681 vs. Alloa Athletic, League One, 3 October 2026
- Lowest home attendance: 430 vs. Aberdeen B, Challenge Cup, 8 September 2026
Home colours	Away colours

The 2026–27 season is Ross County's first season in Scottish League One and the club's first season back in the Third tier of Scottish football since the 2007–08 season. This comes following their relegation from the Scottish Championship at the end of the 2025–26 season. Ross County will also compete in the Scottish Cup, the League Cup and the Challenge Cup.

== Summary ==
Stuart Kettlewell was appointed the club's permanent manager on 4 May 2026 following a short-term contract with the club taking him to the end of the 2025–26 season, with Stephen Frail continuing as his assistant.

== Results and fixtures ==
Win Draw Loss Postponed

=== Pre-season and friendlies ===
27 June 2026	Invergordon	0–7	Ross County	Invergordon
14:00		Report	Strapp; McCarvel; Brown; Chin; Thain	Stadium: Recreation Grounds

27 June 2026	Forres Mechanics	1–5	Ross County	Forres
14:00	Taylor	Report	Coyle; Graham; Wright	Stadium: Mosset Park

30 June 2026	Clachnacuddin	0–2	Ross County	Inverness
19:45		Report	McCarvel 44'; Turner 75'	Stadium: Grant Street Park

4 July 2026 Highland Derby	Inverness CT	0–4	Ross County	Inverness
13:00		Report	Chin 35'; Lindsay 50'; Emslie 52'; Phillips 84'	Stadium: Grant Street Park

14 July 2026	Nairn County	2–2	Ross County	Nairn
19:45	Barron 30'; Gamble 82'	Report	Hastings 52'; McCarvel 71'	Stadium: Station Park; Referee: David Alexander

=== Scottish League One ===
1 August 2026 1	Peterhead	0–1	Ross County	Peterhead
15:00		Report	Graham 66'	Stadium: Balmoor; Attendance: 738; Referee: Cameron Stirling

8 August 2026 2	Ross County	2–1	Montrose	Dingwall
15:00	Strapp 37'; Graham 86'	Report	Oliver 45+3' (pen.)	Stadium: Victoria Park; Attendance: 2,389; Referee: Sean Murdoch

22 August 2026 3	Airdrieonians	1–3	Ross County	Airdrie
15:00	Gibson 50'	Report	Emslie 26'; Lindsay 34'; Wright 74'	Stadium: Excelsior Stadium; Attendance: 992; Referee: Cameron Stirling

29 August 2026 4	Ross County	4–0	East Kilbride	Dingwall
17:30	Graham 45+1', 72'; McCarvel 48'; Lindsay 51'	Report		Stadium: Victoria Park; Attendance: 2,468; Referee: Jamie Wilkie

5 September 2026 5	East Fife	2–2	Ross County	Methil
15:00	Ross 60', 87'	Report	Bah 53' (o.g.); Phillips 90+2'	Stadium: Bayview Stadium; Attendance: 729; Referee: Sean Murdoch

15 September 2026 6	Ross County	8–0	Queen of the South	Dingwall
19:45	Hamilton 6', 46'; Graham 8', 56' (pen.); Phillips 66', 79'; Chin 80'; Lindsay 89'	Report		Stadium: Victoria Park; Attendance: 2,176; Referee: Jordan Curran

19 September 2026 7	Cove Rangers	0–2	Ross County	Cove Bay
15:00		Report	Randall 15'; Diack 88' (pen.)	Stadium: Balmoral Stadium; Attendance: 586; Referee: Gary Hanvidge

3 October 2026 8	Ross County	4–1	Alloa Athletic	Dingwall
15:00	Graham 37' (pen.); Randall 68'; Reid 75'; Hamilton 87'	Report	Taggart 90+2'	Stadium: Victoria Park; Attendance: 2,681; Referee: Iain Snedden

10 October 2026 9	Montrose	0–5	Ross County	Montrose
15:00		Report	Docherty 20'; Chin 25'; Phillips 28'; Graham 52'; Smith 75'	Stadium: Links Park; Attendance: 744; Referee: Sean Murdoch

17 October 2026 10	Queen of the South	1–7	Ross County	Dumfries
15:00	Smith 70'	Report	Chin 4'; Hamilton 8'; Wright 10'; Randall 23'; Docherty 43'; Graham 82', 85' (pen.)	Stadium: Palmerston Park; Attendance: 845; Referee: Graham Grainger

24 October 2026 11	Ross County	4–0	Airdrieonians	Dingwall
15:00	Graham 24', 27', 54'; Chin 45+2'	Report		Stadium: Victoria Park; Attendance: 2,541; Referee: Peter Stuart

27 October 2026 12	Ross County	1–1	Hamilton Academical	Dingwall
19:45	Smith 31'	Report	McKinstry 38'	Stadium: Victoria Park; Attendance: 2,767; Referee: Jamie Wilkie

31 October 2026 13	East Kilbride	1–2	Ross County	East Kilbride
15:00	Baldé 90+1'	Report	Graham 30'; Phillips 76'	Stadium: K-Park Training Academy; Attendance: 689; Referee: Josh Hay

7 November 2026 14	Ross County	4–1	Peterhead	Dingwall
15:00	Graham 36'; Hamilton 59'; Chin 73'; Phillips 86' (pen.)	Report	Megginson 65'	Stadium: Victoria Park; Attendance: 2,466; Referee: Greg Soutar

14 November 2026 15	Hamilton Academical	1–2	Ross County	Hamilton
17:30	Ryan 30'	Report	Graham 25' (pen.); Phillips 77'	Stadium: New Douglas Park; Attendance: 1,216; Referee: Alastair Grieve

21 November 2026 16	Ross County	5–1	Cove Rangers	Dingwall
15:00	Emslie 5', 90+1'; Diack 73'; Chin 83'; Docherty 89'	Report	Keir 52'	Stadium: Victoria Park; Referee: George Calder

=== Scottish League Cup ===
==== Group stage ====
11 July 2026 Group stage	Annan Athletic	1–4	Ross County	Annan
15:00		Report	Graham 31' (pen.), 48'; Muirhead 73' (o.g.); Randall 75'	Stadium: Galabank; Attendance: 402; Referee: Mark Daly

18 July 2026 Group stage	Ross County	3–1	Clyde	Dingwall
15:00	Graham 2', 56'; Chin 5'	Report	Cannon 20'	Stadium: Victoria Park; Attendance: 929; Referee: Gary Hanvidge

21 July 2026 Group stage	Ross County	1–1 (7–6 p)	Dundee	Dingwall
19:45	Graham 55'	Report	Robertson 20'	Stadium: Victoria Park; Attendance: 1,111; Referee: Sean Murdoch
	Penalties
	Graham (penalty scored); Phillips (penalty scored); Lindsay (penalty missed); Strapp (penalty scored); Docherty (penalty scored); Cornelius (penalty scored); McCarvel (penalty scored); Wright (penalty scored)		Murray (penalty scored); Hay (penalty scored); Hamilton (penalty missed); Westley (penalty scored); Forrest (penalty scored); Robertson (penalty scored); Astley (penalty scored); Odutayo (penalty missed)

25 July 2026 Group stage	Airdrieonians	0–3	Ross County	Airdrie
15:00		Report	Lindsay 21'; Turner 51'; Jamieson 76'	Stadium: Excelsior Stadium; Attendance: 601; Referee: Abbie Hendry

==== Knockout phase ====
15 August 2026 Second round	Dunfermline Athletic	1–2	Ross County	Dunfermline
15:00	Oyirwoth 76'	Report	Lindsay 58'; Chin 85'	Stadium: East End Park; Attendance: 3,535; Referee: Ryan Lee

12 September 2026 Quarter–finals	Ross County	0–3	Hibernian	Dingwall
15:00		Report	Klidje 7'; Mayor 14' (pen.); Šuto 39'	Stadium: Victoria Park; Referee: Matthew MacDermid

=== Scottish Challenge Cup ===
==== League phase ====
11 August 2026 1	Elgin City	1–2	Ross County	Elgin
19:45	Colloty 17'	Report	Chin 40'; Emslie 90+2'	Stadium: Borough Briggs; Attendance: 654; Referee: Joel Kennedy

25 August 2026 2	Ross County	4–0	Banks O'Dee	Dingwall
19:45	Jamieson 9'; Phillips 28', 73' (pen.); Coyle 61'	Report		Stadium: Victoria Park; Attendance: 556; Referee: Gary Hanvidge

8 September 2026 3	Ross County	3–4	Aberdeen B	Dingwall
19:45	Phillips 52', 66'; McCarvel 90+3'	Report	Fasanya 13', 21'; Marshall 62' (red card) 69'; Teasdale 90+4'	Stadium: Victoria Park; Attendance: 430; Referee: Mark Daly

22 September 2026 4	Clachnacuddin	1–5	Ross County	Inverness
19:45	Cooper 57'	Report	Smith 8'; Diack 47', 51' (pen.); Macleod 65'; Reid 83'	Stadium: Grant Street Park; Referee: Stuart Broadfoot

26 September 2026 5	Ross County	14–0	Heart of Midlothian B	Dingwall
15:00	Phillips 3', 7', 16', 45+1', 50'; Diack 25', 44', 56' (pen.); McCarvel 65', 74'; Lindsay 68'; Hamilton 72', 75', 87'	Report	Flockhart (red card) 34'	Stadium: Victoria Park; Attendance: 552; Referee: Joel Kennedy

13 October 2026 6	Ross County	2–1	Forfar Athletic	Dingwall
19:45	Turner 37'; Hamilton 88'	Report	Hickey-Fugaccia 70'	Stadium: Victoria Park; Attendance: 628; Referee: Lewis Hogarth

==== Knockout phase ====
3 November 2026 Second round	Ross County	2–0	Celtic B	Dingwall
19:45	Phillips 12', 53'	Report		Stadium: Victoria Park; Referee: Euan Birch

24 November 2026 Third round	Ross County	v	Stenhousemuir	Dingwall
19:45				Stadium: Victoria Park

=== Scottish Cup ===
28 November 2026 Third round	Ross County	v	Brora Rangers	Dingwall
15:00				Stadium: Victoria Park

== Squad statistics ==
=== Captains ===
No.	Pos	Nat	Name	No of games	Notes
9	FW	(Scotland)	Brian Graham	22	Club Captain
43	DF	(Scotland)	Josh Reid	5	
6	MF	(England)	Connor Randall	2	

=== Appearances ===
As of 21 November 2026

No.	Pos	Nat	Player	Total		League One		League Cup		Challenge Cup		Scottish Cup	
No.	Pos	Nat	Player	Apps	Goals	Apps	Goals	Apps	Goals	Apps	Goals	Apps	Goals
1	GK	(England) ENG	Brad Foster	20	0	12	0	6	0	2	0	0	0
2	DF	(Scotland) SCO	Adam Forrester	10	0	1+4	0	0+1	0	4	0	0	0
3	DF	(Scotland) SCO	Lewis Strapp	22	1	13+1	1	6	0	1+1	0	0	0
4	DF	(England) ENG	Akil Wright	23	2	15	2	6	0	1+1	0	0	0
5	DF	(Scotland) SCO	Lewis Reid	20	0	10+2	0	6	0	2	0	0	0
6	MF	(England) ENG	Connor Randall	23	4	14+2	3	2+1	1	2+2	0	0	0
7	MF	(Malaysia) MAS	Richard Chin	25	9	9+6	6	4+1	2	4+1	1	0	0
8	MF	(Scotland) SCO	Dean Cornelius	9	0	0	0	0+4	0	5	0	0	0
9	FW	(Scotland) SCO	Brian Graham	27	21	16	16	6	5	0+5	0	0	0
10	MF	(Scotland) SCO	Jamie Lindsay	26	6	6+8	3	6	2	3+3	1	0	0
11	FW	(England) ENG	Kieran Phillips	26	18	10+5	7	0+5	0	5+1	11	0	0
15	DF	(Scotland) SCO	Dylan Smith	21	3	10+1	2	5	0	4+1	1	0	0
16	MF	(Scotland) SCO	Chris Hamilton	19	9	10+2	5	0+1	0	3+3	4	0	0
17	FW	(Scotland) SCO	Ricco Diack	18	7	0+12	2	0+1	0	5	5	0	0
18	MF	(Scotland) SCO	Andrew Macleod	9	1	0+3	0	0+2	0	4	1	0	0
19	MF	(Scotland) SCO	Luke McCarvel	27	4	15+1	1	2+4	0	1+4	3	0	0
20	MF	(England) ENG	Jack Turner	26	2	4+11	0	6	1	4+1	1	0	0
22	FW	(Scotland) SCO	Adam Emslie	28	4	11+5	3	6	0	3+3	1	0	0
23	MF	(Scotland) SCO	Ross Docherty	21	3	12+1	3	5+1	0	1+1	0	0	0
24	FW	(Scotland) SCO	Lewis Jamieson	11	2	0+6	0	0+1	1	4	1	0	0
28	MF	(Scotland) SCO	Jamie Williamson	7	0	0	0	0+1	0	5+1	0	0	0
30	GK	(Australia) AUS	Nicholas Suman	5	0	4	0	0	0	1	0	0	0
34	MF	(Scotland) SCO	Lewis Mackay	0	0	0	0	0	0	0	0	0	0
35	DF	(Scotland) SCO	Oliver Lamont	2	0	0	0	0	0	2	0	0	0
39	FW	(Scotland) SCO	Joe Coyle	3	1	0	0	0	0	1+2	1	0	0
43	DF	(Scotland) SCO	Josh Reid	16	2	3+5	1	0+2	0	6	1	0	0
45	FW	(Scotland) SCO	Calum Brown	1	0	0	0	0+1	0	0	0	0	0
Players who left the club during the season
31	GK	(England) ENG	Bradley Wade	4	0	0	0	0	0	4	0	0	0

=== Goalscorers ===
Rank	No.	Nat.	Po.	Name	League One	League Cup	Challenge Cup	Scottish Cup	Total
1	9	(Scotland)	FW	Brian Graham	16	5	0	0	21
2	11	(England)	FW	Kieran Phillips	7	0	11	0	18
3	7	(Malaysia)	MF	Richard Chin	6	2	1	0	9
3	16	(Scotland)	MF	Chris Hamilton	5	0	4	0	9
4	17	(Scotland)	FW	Ricco Diack	2	0	5	0	7
5	10	(Scotland)	MF	Jamie Lindsay	3	2	1	0	6
6	6	(England)	MF	Connor Randall	3	1	0	0	4
6	19	(Scotland)	MF	Luke McCarvel	1	0	3	0	4
6	22	(Scotland)	FW	Adam Emslie	3	0	1	0	4
7	15	(Scotland)	DF	Dylan Smith	2	0	1	0	3
7	23	(Scotland)	MF	Ross Docherty	3	0	0	0	3
8	4	(England)	DF	Akil Wright	2	0	0	0	2
8	20	(England)	MF	Jack Turner	0	1	1	0	2
8	24	(Scotland)	FW	Lewis Jamieson	0	1	1	0	2
8	43	(Scotland)	DF	Josh Reid	1	0	1	0	2
9	3	(Scotland)	DF	Lewis Strapp	1	0	0	0	1
9	18	(Scotland)	MF	Andrew Macleod	0	0	1	0	1
9	39	(Scotland)	FW	Joe Coyle	0	0	1	0	1
Own goals					1	1	0	0	2
Total					56	13	32	0	101
As of 21 November 2026

== Team statistics ==
=== League table ===
Pos	Team	Pld	W	D	L	GF	GA	GD	Pts	Promotion, qualification or relegation
1	Ross County	16	14	2	0	56	11	+45	44	Promotion to the Championship
2	Hamilton Academical	16	11	3	2	31	13	+18	36	Qualification for the Championship play-offs
3	East Kilbride	15	7	3	5	27	20	+7	24	Qualification for the Championship play-offs
4	Airdrieonians	16	6	4	6	17	22	−5	22	Qualification for the Championship play-offs
5	Montrose	16	6	3	7	20	27	−7	21	

Updated to match(es) played on 21 November 2026. Source:
Rules for classification: 1) Points; 2) Goal difference; 3) Goals scored; 4) Head-to head points; 5) Head-to-head goal difference; 6) Play-off (only for deciding promotion, play-off participation and relegation).

=== League cup table ===
Pos	Team	Pld	W	PW	PL	L	GF	GA	GD	Pts	Qualification	ROS	DND	CLY	AIR	ANN
1	Ross County	4	3	1	0	0	11	3	+8	11	Qualification for the second round	—	p1–1	3–1	—	—
2	Dundee	4	3	0	1	0	14	3	+11	10	Qualification for the second round	—	—	4–0	4–2	—
3	Clyde	4	2	0	0	2	6	8	−2	6		—	—	—	1–0	4–1
4	Airdrieonians	4	1	0	0	3	5	8	−3	3		0–3	—	—	—	3–0
5	Annan Athletic	4	0	0	0	4	2	16	−14	0		1–4	0–5	—	—	—

Rules for classification: 1) goal difference, 2) goals scored, 3) away goals scored, 4) matches won, 5) away matches won, 6) drawing of lots.

=== Challenge Cup table ===
Pos	Team	Pld	W	D	L	GF	GA	GD	Pts	Qualification
1	Clydebank	6	5	1	0	17	4	+13	16	Advance to Second round (seeded)
2	Ross County	6	5	0	1	30	7	+23	15	Advance to Second round (seeded)
3	Airdrieonians	6	5	0	1	21	8	+13	15	Advance to Second round (seeded)
4	Cove Rangers	6	5	0	1	19	7	+12	15	Advance to Second round (seeded)
5	Peterhead	6	5	0	1	12	4	+8	15	Advance to Second round (seeded)

Source: SPFL
Rules for classification: 1) Points; 2) Goal difference; 3) Goals scored; 4) Highest number of wins; 5) Lower disciplinary points; 6) Drawing of lots.

== Transfers ==
=== In ===
Date	Player	From	Fee
23 May 2026	(Scotland) Lewis Strapp	(Scotland) Airdrieonians	Free
26 May 2026	(Scotland) Brian Graham	(Scotland) Falkirk	Free
28 May 2026	(Scotland) Luke McCarvel	(Scotland) Kelty Hearts	Free
29 May 2026	(Scotland) Lewis Reid	(Scotland) Stranraer	Free
1 June 2026	(Scotland) Chris Hamilton	(Scotland) Dunfermline Athletic	Free
5 June 2026	(England) Jack Turner	(England) Woking	Free
9 June 2026	(Malaysia) Richard Chin	(Scotland) Raith Rovers	Undisclosed
1 July 2026	(England) Bradley Wade	(Northern Ireland) Ballymena United	Free
23 July 2026	(Scotland) Lewis Jamieson	(Wales) Newport County	Undisclosed
30 July 2026	(Scotland) Adam Forrester	(Scotland) Heart of Midlothian	Loan
31 August 2026	(Scotland) Ricco Diack	(Scotland) Partick Thistle	Loan
28 September 2026	(Australia) Nicholas Suman	(Scotland) Aberdeen	Loan

=== Out ===
Date	Player	To	Fee
4 May 2026	(Scotland) Ross Laidlaw		Free
4 May 2026	(Scotland) Alex Iacovitti		Free
4 May 2026	(Uganda) Uche Ikpeazu		Free
3 June 2026	(England) Ben Crompton	(England) Kidderminster Harriers	Free
8 June 2026	(Scotland) Jay Henderson	(Northern Ireland) Coleraine	Free
11 June 2026	(Scotland) Arron Lyall	(Scotland) Raith Rovers	Free
24 June 2026	(Scotland) Jordan White	(Scotland) Cove Rangers	Free
8 July 2026	(England) Noah Chilvers	(England) Oldham Athletic	Undisclosed
18 July 2026	(Scotland) Rio Hastings	(Scotland) Rothes	Loan
21 July 2026	(Scotland) Declan Gallagher	(Scotland) Airdrieonians	Free
23 July 2026	(Scotland) Calum Brown	(Scotland) Elgin City	Co-operation loan
23 July 2026	(Scotland) Lewis Mackay	(Scotland) Elgin City	Co-operation loan
23 July 2026	(Scotland) Ruaridh Campbell	(Scotland) Alness United	Loan
23 July 2026	(Scotland) Sam MacLennan	(Scotland) Alness United	Loan
23 July 2026	(Scotland) Alexander Brown	(Scotland) Alness United	Loan
24 July 2026	(Scotland) Joe Coyle	(Scotland) Invergordon	Co-operation loan
24 July 2026	(Scotland) Copeland Thain	(Scotland) Invergordon	Co-operation loan
24 July 2026	(Scotland) Oliver Lamont	(Scotland) Invergordon	Co-operation loan
24 July 2026	(Scotland) Jayden Reid	(Scotland) Invergordon	Loan
24 July 2026	(Scotland) Torran Lambie	(Scotland) Invergordon	Loan
4 September 2026	(Republic of Ireland) Len O'Sullivan	(Northern Ireland) Ballymena United	Free
28 September 2026	(England) Bradley Wade		Free
