= 2020–21 Ross County F.C. season =

Ross County
2020–21 season
- Chairman: Roy MacGregor
- Manager: Stuart Kettlewell (until 19 December); John Hughes
- Ground: Victoria Park; Dingwall, Ross-shire (Capacity: 6,541)
- Scottish Premiership: 10th
- Scottish League Cup: Quarter-finals
- Scottish Cup: Third round
- Top goalscorer: League: Oli Shaw (6); All: Oli Shaw (8)
Home colours	Away colours

The 2020–21 season is Ross County's second consecutive season in the Scottish Premiership and the club's 8th season overall in the top flight of Scottish football. Ross County will also compete in the Scottish Cup and Scottish League Cup. Stuart Kettlewell was sacked as the club's manager on 19 December, after a defeat to Hamilton. John Hughes was appointed as the new manager on 21 December.

== Results and fixtures ==
Win Draw Loss Postponed

=== Pre-season ===
11 July 2020 Friendly	Aberdeen	2–2	Ross County	Aberdeen
	Anderson		Charles-Cook; Mckay	Stadium: Cormack Park; Attendance: 0

25 July 2020 Friendly	Livingston	2–2	Ross County	Livingston
14:00	Dykes 33'; Kouider-Aissa 49'		Stewart 55'; Fontaine 75'	Stadium: Almondvale Stadium; Attendance: 0

26 July 2020 Friendly	Celtic	2–0	Ross County	Glasgow
13:00	Donaldson 3' (o.g.); Elyounoussi 14'			Stadium: Celtic Park; Attendance: 0

=== Scottish Premiership ===
3 August 2020 1	Ross County	1–0	Motherwell	Dingwall
19:45	Stewart 24' (pen.); Paton (yellow card) 57'; Reid (yellow card) 75'		Gallagher (yellow card) 24'; Donnelly (penalty missed) 73'; Lang (red card) 87'	Stadium: Victoria Park; Attendance: 0 Referee: Nick Walsh

8 August 2020 2	Hamilton Academical	0–1	Ross County	Hamilton
15:00			McKay 76'; Vigurs (yellow card) 90+1'	Stadium: New Douglas Park; Attendance: 0 Referee: Bobby Madden

12 August 2020 3	Ross County	2–2	Kilmarnock	Dingwall
19:45	Draper 15'; Stewart 79' (pen.)		Power 59'; Burke 66'	Stadium: Victoria Park; Attendance: 0 Referee: Gavin Duncan

15 August 2020 4	Ross County	1–2	Dundee United	Dingwall
15:00	Paton (yellow card) 22'; Donaldson 29' (yellow card) 87'		Appéré (yellow card) 34'; Pawlett 40'; Clark 79'	Stadium: Victoria Park; Attendance: 0 Referee: Craig Napier

22 August 2020 5	St Mirren	1–1	Ross County	Paisley
15:00	Obika 14'; Shaughnessy (red card) 62'		Reid (yellow card) 28'; Vigurs (yellow card) 41'; Sheron 70' (o.g.)	Stadium: St Mirren Park; Attendance: 0

29 August 2020 6	Livingston	1–0	Ross County	Livingston
15:00	Guthrie 64'; Serrano (yellow card) 67'		Draper (yellow card) 18'; Tremarco (red card) 51'; Gardyne (yellow card) 65'; Donaldson (yellow card) 90+3'	Stadium: Almondvale Stadium; Attendance: 0 Referee: John Beaton

12 September 2020 7	Ross County	0–5	Celtic	Dingwall
15:00			Édouard 4' (pen.); Ajeti 20'; Duffy 59'; Ajer 64'; Klimala 75'	Stadium: Victoria Park; Attendance: 300; Referee: Andrew Dallas

19 September 2020 8	St Johnstone	0–1	Ross County	Perth
15:00			Vigurs 42'	Stadium: McDiarmid Park; Attendance: 0 Referee: David Munro

27 September 2020 9	Ross County	0–3	Aberdeen	Dingwall
15:00	Vigurs (red card) 60'		Watkins 42'; Ferguson 60' (pen.), 76' (pen.)	Stadium: Victoria Park; Attendance: 0 Referee: Willie Collum

4 October 2020 10	Rangers	2–0	Ross County	Glasgow
15:00	Tavernier 17' (pen.); Barker 88'			Stadium: Ibrox Stadium; Attendance: 0 Referee: Greg Aitken

17 October 2020 11	Ross County	0–0	Hibernian	Dingwall
15:00	Randall (red card) 79'			Stadium: Victoria Park; Attendance: 0 Referee: Nick Walsh

24 October 2020 12	Motherwell	4–0	Ross County	Motherwell
15:00	Watt 37'; Long (yellow card) 41'; O'Hara 54' (pen.); Lang 64'; Maguire (yellow card) 65'; Cole 72'		Vigurs (yellow card) 53'	Stadium: Fir Park; Attendance: 0 Referee: Craig Napier

31 October 2020 13	Dundee United	2–1	Ross County	Tannadice Park
15:00	Clark 19' (pen.), 51'		Shaw 81'	Attendance: 0 Referee: Steven Kirkland

6 November 2020 14	Ross County	1–1	Livingston	Dingwall
19:45	Shaw 28'; Kelly (yellow card) 90'		Devlin 56'; Bartley (yellow card) 70'	Stadium: Victoria Park; Attendance: 300; Referee: Kevin Clancy

21 November 2020 15	Kilmarnock	3–1	Ross County	Kilmarnock
15:00	Findlay (red card) 8'; Brophy 14'; Kabamba 68' (pen.); McKenzie (yellow card) 90+1'; Burke 90+3'		Grivosti 42'	Stadium: Rugby Park; Attendance: 0 Referee: Colin Steven

6 December 2020 16	Ross County	0–4	Rangers	Dingwall
12:00			Roofe 28'; Tavernier 56'; Morris 72' (o.g.); Defoe 90'	Stadium: Victoria Park; Attendance: 300; Referee: John Beaton

12 December 2020 17	Aberdeen	2–0	Ross County	Aberdeen
15:00	Main 5', 57'			Stadium: Pittodrie; Attendance: 0 Referee: Nick Walsh

19 December 2020 18	Ross County	0–2	Hamilton Academical	Dingwall
15:00			Callachan 22'; Martin 62'	Stadium: Victoria Park; Attendance: 300; Referee: William Collum

23 December 2020 19	Celtic	2–0	Ross County	Glasgow
	Turnbull 24'; Griffiths 61'			Stadium: Celtic Park; Attendance: 0 Referee: Euan Anderson

26 December 2020 20	Ross County	0–2	St Mirren	Victoria Park
15:00	Reid (red card) 36'; Draper (red card) 60'		Fraser 76'; Dennis 85'	Attendance: 0 Referee: Colin Steven

30 December 2020 21	Hibernian	0–2	Ross County	Edinburgh
18:00			Paton 25'; Shaw 76'	Stadium: Easter Road; Attendance: 0 Referee: Don Robertson

2 January 2021 22	Ross County	1–1	St Johnstone	Dingwall
15:00	Draper 21'		Conway 26' (pen.)	Stadium: Victoria Park; Attendance: 0 Referee: William Collum

10 January 2021 23	Livingston	3−1	Ross County	Almondvale Stadium
15:00	Robinson 9'; Forrest 81'; Hamilton 90+1'		Lakin 28'	Attendance: 0 Referee: Alan Muir

16 January 2021 24	Ross County	4–1	Aberdeen	Dingwall
15:00	Shaw 1', 84'; Lakin 20'; Hylton 90+3'		Iacovitti 45+1' (o.g.)	Stadium: Victoria Park; Attendance: 0 Referee: Colin Dteven

23 January 2021 25	Rangers	5–0	Ross County	Glasgow
15:00	Kent 6'; Helander 28'; Aribo 37'; Jack 66'; Goldson 81'			Stadium: Ibrox Stadium; Attendance: 0 Referee: Euan Anderson

27 January 2021 26	Ross County	1–2	Motherwell	Dingwall
18:00	Shaw 14'		Cole 51'; Mugabi 72'	Stadium: Victoria Park; Attendance: 0 Referee: Nick Walsh

3 February 2021 27	Hamilton Academical	1–2	Ross County	Hamilton
18:00	Kelly 16' (o.g.)		White 81'; McKay 85'	Stadium: New Douglas Park; Attendance: 0 Referee: William Collum

6 February 2021 28	Ross County	0–2	Dundee United	Dingwall
15:00			Shankland 63'; Edwards 76'	Stadium: Victoria Park; Attendance: 0 Referee: Grant Irvine

21 February 2021 29	Ross County	1–0	Celtic	Dingwall
19:30	White 71'			Stadium: Victoria Park; Attendance: 0 Referee: David Munro

27 February 2021 30	St Mirren	1–0	Ross County	Paisley
15:00	McGrath 82' (pen.)			Stadium: St Mirren Park; Attendance: 0 Referee: Greg Aitken

6 March 2021 31	Ross County	3–2	Kilmarnock	Dingwall
15:00	McKay 38', 49'; Hjelde 47'		Lafferty 18', 77' (pen.); Millen (red card) 90+2'	Stadium: Victoria Park; Attendance: 0 Referee: Euan Anderson

13 March 2021 32	Ross County	1–2	Hibernian	Dingwall
15:00	McKay 50'		Boyle 52' (pen.); Nisbet 60'	Stadium: Victoria Park; Attendance: 0 Referee: John Beaton

20 March 2021 33	St Johnstone	1−0	Ross County	Perth
15:00	Middleton 86'			Stadium: McDiarmid Park; Attendance: 0 Referee: Craig Napier

10 April 2021 34	Kilmarnock	2–2	Ross County	Kilmarnock
15:00	Burke 3'; Pinnock 16'		Gardyne 5'; Iacovitti 54'	Stadium: Rugby Park; Attendance: 0 Referee: Colin Steven

21 April 2021 35	Ross County	1–3	St Mirren	Dingwall
19:45	White 18'		Erwin 50'; Durmuş 71'; McGrath 90+2' (pen.)	Stadium: Victoria Park; Attendance: 0 Referee: Bobby Madden

1 May 2020 36	Dundee United	0–2	Ross County	Dundee
15:00			White 24'; Iacovitti 28'	Stadium: Tannadice Park; Attendance: 0 Referee: Kevin Clancy

12 May 2021 37	Ross County	2–1	Hamilton Academical	Dingwall
19:45	Spittal 28'; Lakin 70'		McMann 26'	Stadium: Victoria Park; Attendance: 0 Referee: William Collum

16 May 2021 38	Motherwell	1–2	Ross County	Motherwell
12:00	Foley 7'		Vigurs 49'; Gardyne 66'	Stadium: Fir Park; Attendance: 0 Referee: Steven McLean

=== Scottish League Cup ===
==== Group stage ====
7 October 2020 Group stage	Montrose	3–3 (4–5 p)	Ross County	Montrose
19:45	Webster 63'; Ballantyne 67'; Steeves 89'		Shaw 13'; Mckay 15'; Charles-Cook 52'	Stadium: Links Park; Attendance: 0 Referee: Gavin Duncan
	Penalties
	Webster (penalty scored); Steeves (penalty scored); Milne (penalty scored); Campbell (penalty scored); Rennie (penalty missed)		(penalty scored) Stewart; (penalty scored) Mckay; (penalty scored) Paton; (penalty scored) Gardyne; (penalty scored) Lakin

13 October 2020 Group stage	Ross County	2–1	Arbroath	Dingwall
19:45	Stewart 65', 68' (pen.)		Hilson 49'	Stadium: Victoria Park; Attendance: 0 Referee: Steven McLean

10 November 2020 Group stage	Elgin City	1–4	Ross County	Elgin
19:45	Cooper (yellow card); Cameron 80'		Grivosti 5'; Iacovitti 45'; Paton 51'; Lakin 77'	Stadium: Borough Briggs; Attendance: 0 Referee: Gavin Duncan

14 November 2020 Group stage	Ross County	3–0	Stirling Albion	Dingwall
15:00	Shaw 21'; Stewart 50' (pen.); Charles-Cook 52'			Stadium: Global Energy Stadium; Attendance: 300; Referee: Alan Muir

==== Knockout phase ====
29 November 2020 Second round	Celtic	0–2	Ross County	Glasgow
14:00		Report	Stewart 39' (pen.); Iacovitti 84'	Stadium: Celtic Park; Attendance: 0 Referee: Kevin Clancy

16 December 2020 Quarter-finals	Livingston	2–0	Ross County	Livingston
19:45	Sibbald 4'; Forrest 24'			Stadium: Tony Macaroni Arena; Attendance: 0 Referee: Steven McLean

=== Scottish Cup ===
2 April 2021 Third round	Ross County	1–3	Inverness Caledonian Thistle	Dingwall
19:45	Mckay 38'		Todorov 40'; D.MacKay 54'; Sutherland 87'	Stadium: Victoria Park; Attendance: 0 Referee: Nick Walsh

== Squad statistics ==
=== Appearances ===
As of 16 May 2021

No.	Pos	Nat	Player	Total		Premiership		Scottish Cup		League Cup	
No.	Pos	Nat	Player	Apps	Goals	Apps	Goals	Apps	Goals	Apps	Goals
1	GK	(Scotland) SCO	Ross Laidlaw	40	0	33	0	1	0	6	0
2	DF	(England) ENG	Connor Randall	17	0	13+2	0	0	0	1+1	0
3	DF	(England) ENG	Carl Tremarco	15	0	8+4	0	0	0	3	0
5	DF	(Northern Ireland) NIR	Callum Morris	17	0	12	0	0	0	4+1	0
4	DF	(Norway) NOR	Leo Hjelde	12	1	10+1	1	1	0	0	0
6	MF	(England) ENG	Ross Draper	22	2	13+8	2	0	0	0+1	0
7	FW	(Scotland) SCO	Michael Gardyne	35	2	21+10	2	1	0	1+2	0
8	FW	(Scotland) SCO	Oli Shaw	31	8	12+13	6	1	0	3+2	2
9	FW	(Northern Ireland) NIR	Billy Mckay	35	7	14+14	5	1	1	4+2	1
10	MF	(France) FRA	Mohamed Maouche	0	0	0	0	0	0	0	0
11	MF	(Scotland) SCO	Iain Vigurs (c)	35	2	28+2	2	1	0	4	0
12	DF	(England) ENG	Tom Grivosti	7	2	3+2	1	0	0	2	1
14	FW	(England) ENG	Jermaine Hylton	23	1	7+11	1	0+1	0	4	0
15	DF	(Scotland) SCO	Keith Watson	26	0	17+6	0	1	0	2	0
16	DF	(Scotland) SCO	Alex Iacovitti	42	4	34+2	2	0	0	5+1	2
17	MF	(Grenada) GRN	Regan Charles-Cook	32	2	9+17	0	0+1	0	5	2
18	MF	(Scotland) SCO	Stephen Kelly	29	0	16+9	0	1	0	3	0
19	MF	(England) ENG	Charlie Lakin	24	4	14+5	3	1	0	3+1	1
20	MF	(Scotland) SCO	Blair Spittal	9	1	7+2	1	0	0	0	0
21	GK	(England) ENG	Joe Hilton	0	0	0	0	0	0	0	0
22	MF	(England) ENG	Jordan Tillson	36	0	20+12	0	0	0	2+2	0
22	DF	(Scotland) SCO	Jason Naismith	18	0	17	0	1	0	0	0
24	MF	(Canada) CAN	Harry Paton	40	2	25+10	1	0	0	4+1	1
25	DF	(Scotland) SCO	Coll Donaldson	34	1	26+2	1	1	0	4+1	0
26	FW	(Scotland) SCO	Jordan White	13	4	11+1	4	0+1	0	0	0
28	MF	(France) FRA	Tony Andreu	6	0	4+2	0	0	0	0	0
31	GK	(Scotland) SCO	Ross Munro	0	0	0	0	0	0	0	0
44	FW	(Scotland) SCO	Matthew Wright	3	0	0+2	0	0	0	0+1	0
46	DF	(Scotland) SCO	Ben Williamson	2	0	0	0	0	0	0+2	0
47	MF	(Scotland) SCO	Adam Mackinnon	1	0	0	0	0	0	0+1	0
Players who left the club during the season
10	FW	(Scotland) SCO	Lee Erwin	4	0	2+2	0	0	0	0	0
10	FW	(Republic of Ireland) IRL	Michael O'Connor	1	0	0	0	0	0	0+1	0
14	MF	(Scotland) SCO	Josh Mullin	5	0	1+4	0	0	0	0	0
21	GK	(Scotland) SCO	Ross Doohan	5	0	5	0	0	0	0	0
27	FW	(Scotland) SCO	Ross Stewart	24	6	19	2	0	0	4+1	4
41	GK	(Scotland) SCO	Logan Ross	0	0	0	0	0	0	0	0
43	DF	(Scotland) SCO	Josh Reid	24	0	17+3	0	0	0	3+1	0

=== Goalscorers ===
Rank	No.	Nat.	Po.	Name	League	Cup	League Cup	Total
1	8	(Scotland)	FW	Oli Shaw	6	0	2	8
2	9	(Northern Ireland)	FW	Billy McKay	5	1	1	7
3	27	(Scotland)	FW	Ross Stewart	2	0	4	6
4	26	(Scotland)	FW	Jordan White	4	0	0	4
4	19	(England)	MF	Charlie Lakin	3	0	1	4
4	16	(Scotland)	DF	Alex Iacovitti	2	0	2	4
7	6	(England)	MF	Ross Draper	2	0	0	2
7	7	(Scotland)	MF	Michael Gardyne	2	0	0	2
7	11	(Scotland)	MF	Iain Vigurs	2	0	0	2
7	24	(Canada)	MF	Harry Paton	1	0	1	2
7	12	(England)	DF	Tom Grivosti	1	0	1	2
7	17	(England)	MF	Regan Charles-Cook	0	0	2	2
11	14	(England)	FW	Jermaine Hylton	1	0	0	1
11	20	(Scotland)	MF	Blair Spittal	1	0	0	1
11	25	(Scotland)	DF	Coll Donaldson	1	0	0	1
11	4	(Norway)	DF	Leo Hjelde	1	0	0	1
Own goals					1	0	0	1
Total					35	1	14	50
As of 16 May 2021

== Team statistics ==
=== League table ===
Pos	Team	Pld	W	D	L	GF	GA	GD	Pts	Qualification or relegation (Note: Teams play each other three times (33 matches), before the league is split into two groups (the top six and the bottom six).)
8	Motherwell	38	12	9	17	39	55	−16	45	
9	Dundee United	38	10	14	14	32	50	−18	44	
10	Ross County	38	11	6	21	35	66	−31	39	
11	Kilmarnock (R)	38	10	6	22	43	54	−11	36	Qualification for the Premiership play-off final
12	Hamilton Academical (R)	38	7	9	22	34	67	−33	30	Relegation to Championship

Rules for classification: 1) Points; 2) Goal difference; 3) Goals scored; 4) Head-to-head points; 5) Head-to-Head goal difference; 6) Play-off (only if deciding champion, UEFA competitions qualification, second stage group allocation or relegation).
(R) Relegated

=== League cup table ===
Pos	Team	Pld	W	PW	PL	L	GF	GA	GD	Pts	Qualification	ROS	ARB	ELG	STI	MON
1	Ross County	4	3	1	0	0	12	5	+7	11	Qualification for the Second round	—	2–1	—	3–0	—
2	Arbroath	4	3	0	0	1	9	4	+5	9	Qualification for the Second round	—	—	3–0	—	3–1
3	Elgin City	4	2	0	0	2	5	7	−2	6		1–4	—	—	2–0	—
4	Stirling Albion	4	1	0	0	3	3	8	−5	3		—	1–2	—	—	2–1
5	Montrose	4	0	0	1	3	5	10	−5	1		3–3p	—	0–2	—	—

Rules for classification: 1) points, 2) goal difference, 3) goals scored, 4) away goals scored, 5) matches won, 6) away matches won, 7) drawing of lots.

== Transfers ==
=== In ===
Date	Player	From	Fee
24 June 2020	(Scotland) Stephen Kelly	(Scotland) Rangers	Loan
25 June 2020	(England) Connor Randall	(Bulgaria) Arda Kardzhali	Free
26 June 2020	(Scotland) Alex Iacovitti	(England) Oldham Athletic	Free
30 June 2020	(Grenada) Regan Charles-Cook	(England) Gillingham	Free
16 July 2020	(England) Carl Tremarco	(Scotland) Inverness Caledonian Thistle	Free
1 August 2020	(Scotland) Ross Doohan	(Scotland) Celtic	Loan
27 September 2020	(Republic of Ireland) Michael O'Connor	(Republic of Ireland) Waterford	Undisclosed
2 October 2020	(England) Jermaine Hylton	(Scotland) Motherwell	Free
5 October 2020	(England) Charlie Lakin	(England) Birmingham City	Loan
8 December 2020	(Scotland) Jason Naismith	(England) Peterborough United	Free
7 January 2021	(France) Tony Andreu	(Scotland) St Mirren	Free
8 January 2021	(France) Mohamed Maouche	(England) Oldham Athletic	Free
22 January 2021	(Norway) Leo Hjelde	(Scotland) Celtic	Loan
27 January 2021	(England) Joe Hilton	(England) Blackburn Rovers	Loan
28 January 2021	(Scotland) Jordan White	(Scotland) Motherwell	Free

=== Out ===
Date	Player	To	Fee
10 June 2020	(Scotland) Don Cowie	Retired	Free
10 July 2020	(Scotland) Declan McManus	(Scotland) Dunfermline Athletic	Free
20 July 2020	(Scotland) Richard Foster	(Scotland) Partick Thistle	Free
28 July 2020	(Scotland) Marcus Fraser	(Scotland) St Mirren	Free
3 August 2020	(Scotland) Lewis Spence	(England) Scunthorpe United	Free
10 September 2020	(Scotland) Lee Erwin	(Scotland) St Mirren	Free
15 September 2020	(Scotland) Joe Chalmers	(Scotland) Ayr United	Undisclosed
5 October 2020	(Scotland) Josh Mullin	(Scotland) Livingston	Free
28 October 2020	(Scotland) Sean Kelly	(Scotland) Falkirk	Free
18 November 2020	(Scotland) Adam Mackinnon	(Scotland) Brora Rangers	Loan
18 November 2020	(Scotland) Logan Ross	(Scotland) Lossiemouth	Loan
20 November 2020	(England) Liam Fontaine	(Scotland) Dundee	Free
1 December 2020	(Republic of Ireland) Michael O'Connor	(Republic of Ireland) Shelbourne	Free
28 January 2021	(Scotland) Josh Reid	(England) Coventry City	Undisclosed
31 January 2021	(Scotland) Ross Stewart	(England) Sunderland	£300,000

== See also ==
- List of Ross County F.C. seasons
