= 2025–26 Ross County F.C. season =

Ross County
2025–26 season
- Chairman: Roy MacGregor
- Manager: Don Cowie (until 24 August); John Robertson (from 24 August – 2 September & 15 December – 30 December) (interim); Tony Docherty (from 3 September – 14 December); Stuart Kettlewell (from 30 December)
- Ground: Victoria Park; Dingwall, Ross-shire (Capacity: 6,541)
- Scottish Championship: Tenth place (relegated)
- Scottish Cup: Fourth round
- League Cup: Group stage
- Challenge Cup: Third round
- Top goalscorer: League: Ronan Hale (7); All: Ronan Hale (12)
- Highest home attendance: 3,433 vs. St Johnstone, Championship, 27 December 2025
- Lowest home attendance: 479 vs. Celtic B, Challenge Cup, 9 December 2025
- Average home league attendance: 2,880

The 2025–26 season is Ross County's first season in the Scottish Championship and the club's first season back in the second tier of Scottish football following their relegation from the Scottish Premiership at the end of the 2024–25 season. Ross County will also compete in the Scottish Cup, the League Cup and the Challenge Cup.

== Results and fixtures ==
Win Draw Loss Postponed

=== Pre-season and friendlies ===
1 July 2025 Friendly	Strathspey Thistle	0–5	Ross County	Grantown-on-Spey
19:45		Report	Phillips 16'; Hale 49', 72', 75'; Brown 83'	Stadium: Seafield Park
Note: Testimonial match for Aaron Doran

5 July 2025 Friendly	Inverness CT	0–2	Ross County	Inverness
14:00		Report	Hale 7', 45'	Stadium: Caledonian Stadium; Attendance: 2,000
Note: Testimonial match for Aaron Doran

8 July 2025 Friendly	Clachnacuddin	0–2	Ross County	Inverness
19:00			Henderson 47'; Hale 74'	Stadium: Grant Street Park

=== Scottish Championship ===
2 August 2025 1	Airdrieonians	2–2	Ross County	Airdrie
15:00	Henderson 63', 74'	Report	Wright 19', 48'	Stadium: Excelsior Stadium; Attendance: 1,278; Referee: Lloyd Wilson

8 August 2025 2	Ross County	0–1	St Johnstone	Dingwall
19:45		Report	Ikpeazu 82'	Stadium: Victoria Park; Attendance: 3,185; Referee: Dan McFarlane

23 August 2025 3	Ross County	1–3	Partick Thistle	Dingwall
15:00	Randall 66'	Report	Stanway 28'; Chalmers 48'; Lawless 90+2' (pen.)	Stadium: Victoria Park; Attendance: 3,098; Referee: Iain Snedden

30 August 2025 4	Dunfermline Athletic	2–2	Ross County	Dunfermline
15:00	Chilokoa-Mullen 23'; Rudden 58'	Report	Hale 36', 89'	Stadium: East End Park; Attendance: 4,828; Referee: Nick Walsh

6 September 2025 5	Ross County	1–2	Arbroath	Dingwall
15:00	Phillips 58' (pen.)	Report	Todorov 31'; Muirhead 89' (pen.)	Stadium: Victoria Park; Attendance: 2,676; Referee: Chris Graham

13 September 2025 6	Ayr United	1–1	Ross County	Ayr
15:00	Walker 2'	Report	Henderson 49'	Stadium: Somerset Park; Attendance: 1,912; Referee: Matthew MacDermid

20 September 2025 7	Ross County	1–2	Queen's Park	Dingwall
15:00	Hale 44' (pen.); Gallagher (red card) 60'	Report	Fowler 39', 76'	Stadium: Victoria Park; Attendance: 2,800; Referee: Alastair Grieve

27 September 2025 8	Greenock Morton	1–1	Ross County	Greenock
15:00	Blues 73'	Report	Hale 18' (pen.)	Stadium: Cappielow; Attendance: 1,450; Referee: Dan McFarlane

4 October 2025 9	Ross County	2–0	Raith Rovers	Dingwall
15:00	Thomson 73'; Hale 90+2'	Report		Stadium: Victoria Park; Attendance: 2,675; Referee: Colin Steven

11 October 2025 10	St Johnstone	0–0	Ross County	Perth
15:00		Report		Stadium: McDiarmid Park; Attendance: 3,750; Referee: David Dickinson

18 October 2025 11	Partick Thistle	1–0	Ross County	Glasgow
15:00	Smyth 58'	Report		Stadium: Firhill Stadium; Attendance: 3,182; Referee: Peter Stuart

25 October 2025 12	Ross County	3–2	Dunfermline Athletic	Dingwall
15:00	Fraser 2'; White 3'; Hale 67'	Report	A.Tod 45+1'; Randall 53' (o.g.)	Stadium: Victoria Park; Attendance: 2,771; Referee: Duncan Nicolson

1 November 2025 13	Arbroath	3–0	Ross County	Arbroath
15:00	Cochrane 8'; MacIntyre 56'; Steven 77'	Report		Stadium: Gayfield Park; Attendance: 1,491; Referee: Lloyd Wilson

8 November 2025 14	Ross County	3–3	Ayr United	Dingwall
15:00	Hale 30'; Holt 32' (o.g.); White 51'	Report	Walker 23'; McMann 66'; Main 71'	Stadium: Victoria Park; Attendance: 2,603; Referee: Chris Graham

15 November 2025 15	Ross County	0–3	Greenock Morton	Dingwall
15:00		Report	Shaw 20'; MacPherson 58'; Garrity 77'	Stadium: Victoria Park; Attendance: 2,803; Referee: Euan Anderson

6 December 2025 16	Ross County	1–2	Airdrieonians	Dingwall
15:00	Henderson 83'	Report	Gallagher 57'; Henderson 67'	Stadium: Victoria Park; Attendance: 2,828; Referee: Calum Scott

13 December 2025 17	Raith Rovers	6–0	Ross County	Kirkcaldy
15:00	Brown 8'; Easton 14' (pen.), 49'; Rowe 37'; Nsio 77'; Hamilton 83'	Report		Stadium: Stark's Park; Attendance: 3,001; Referee: Matthew MacDermid

20 December 2025 18	Ross County	0–2	Arbroath	Dingwall
15:00		Report	MacIntyre 33'; Steven 83'	Stadium: Victoria Park; Attendance: 2,653; Referee: Duncan Nicolson

27 December 2025 19	Ross County	0–0	St Johnstone	Dingwall
15:00		Report		Stadium: Victoria Park; Attendance: 3,433; Referee: Sean Murdoch

9 January 2026 20	Ross County	2–0	Partick Thistle	Dingwall
19:45	Henderson 1', 10'	Report		Stadium: Victoria Park; Attendance: 2,720; Referee: Colin Steven

24 January 2026 21	Airdrieonians	0–1	Ross County	Airdrie
15:00		Report	Phillips 87'	Stadium: Excelsior Stadium; Attendance: 1,151; Referee: Duncan Nicolson

31 January 2026 22	Greenock Morton	2–1	Ross County	Greenock
15:00	Brophy 19'; O'Halloran 67'	Report	Iacovitti 89'	Stadium: Cappielow; Attendance: 1,657; Referee: Grant Irvine

3 February 2026 23	Queen's Park	0–1	Ross County	Glasgow
19:45		Report	Ikpeazu 79'	Stadium: Lesser Hampden; Attendance: 718; Referee: Lloyd Wilson

14 February 2026 24	Ross County	0–1	Queen's Park	Dingwall
15:00		Report	Shiels 45+2'	Stadium: Victoria Park; Attendance: 2,897; Referee: Sean Murdoch

21 February 2026 25	Ayr United	0–0	Ross County	Ayr
15:00		Report		Stadium: Somerset Park; Attendance: 1,921; Referee: Chris Graham

28 February 2026 26	Ross County	2–0	Raith Rovers	Dingwall
15:00	White 33'; Ikpeazu 43'	Report		Stadium: Victoria Park; Attendance: 2,903; Referee: Lloyd Wilson

3 March 2026 27	Dunfermline Athletic	3–0	Ross County	Dunfermline
19:45	Morrison 15', 26'; Kane 80'	Report		Stadium: East End Park; Attendance: 4,962; Referee: Chris Graham

7 March 2026 28	Arbroath	0–0	Ross County	Arbroath
15:00		Report	Kamara (red card) 22'; Docherty (red card) 86'	Stadium: Gayfield Park; Attendance: 1,395; Referee: Calum Scott

14 March 2026 29	St Johnstone	1–0	Ross County	Perth
15:00	McAlear 25'	Report		Stadium: McDiarmid Park; Attendance: 4,223; Referee: Colin Steven

21 March 2026 30	Ross County	2–2	Dunfermline Athletic	Dingwall
15:00	Phillips 12', 16'; Mackie (red card) 90+3'	Report	Morrison 33'; A.Tod 69'	Stadium: Victoria Park; Attendance: 3,203; Referee: Grant Irvine

27 March 2026 31	Partick Thistle	3–1	Ross County	Glasgow
19:45	Samuel 19'; Crawford 25'; McPherson 45'	Report	Lindsay 2'	Stadium: Firhill Stadium; Attendance: 3,370; Referee: Chris Graham

4 April 2026 32	Ross County	0–4	Airdrieonians	Dingwall
15:00		Report	Strapp 5'; Mochrie 17'; McKinnon 39'; Devine 79'	Stadium: Victoria Park; Attendance: 2,859; Referee: David Dickinson

10 April 2026 33	Queen's Park	1–0	Ross County	Glasgow
19:45	Connolly 16'	Report		Stadium: Lesser Hampden; Attendance: 846; Referee: Colin Steven

18 April 2026 34	Ross County	2–1	Ayr United	Dingwall
15:00	Duncan 4'; Iacovitti 70'	Report	Dowds 42'	Stadium: Victoria Park; Attendance: 2,712; Referee: Dan McFarlane

25 April 2026 35	Ross County	4–0	Greenock Morton	Dingwall
15:00	Wright 10'; White 19'; Chilvers 49'; Duncan 80'	Report		Stadium: Victoria Park; Attendance: 3,014; Referee: Calum Scott

1 May 2026 36	Raith Rovers	3–2	Ross County	Kirkcaldy
19:45	Cameron 76'; Hamilton 80'; Mullin 90+8' (pen.)	Report	Phillips 16'; Carbon 90+6'; Wright (red card) 90+7'	Stadium: Stark's Park; Attendance: 3,309; Referee: Duncan Nicolson

=== Scottish League Cup ===
==== Group stage ====
12 July 2025 Group Stage	Stranraer	1–1 (6–5 p)	Ross County	Stranraer
15:00	Sharp 76'	Report	Hale 43'	Stadium: Stair Park; Attendance: 469; Referee: Graham Grainger

19 July 2025 Group Stage	Queen of the South	0–1	Ross County	Dumfries
15:00		Report	Henderson 73'	Stadium: Palmerston Park; Attendance: 1,012; Referee: Peter Stuart

22 July 2025 Group Stage	Ross County	8–0	Edinburgh City	Dingwall
19:45	Hale 22', 39', 47' (pen.); Henderson 37', 57'; Coyle 76', 89'; Phillips 82'	Report		Stadium: Victoria Park; Attendance: 1,265; Referee: Sean Murdoch

26 July 2025 Group Stage	Ross County	1–3	Partick Thistle	Dingwall
15:00	White 88'	Report	Crawford 44'; Chalmers 64'; Stanway 84'	Stadium: Victoria Park; Attendance: 1,740; Referee: Ryan Lee

=== Scottish Challenge Cup ===
9 December 2025 Second round	Ross County	4–0	Celtic B	Dingwall
19:45	Henderson 41'; Docherty 47'; Lindsay 81', 85'	Report		Stadium: Victoria Park; Attendance: 479; Referee: Joel Kennedy

13 January 2026 Third round	St Johnstone	2–0	Ross County	Perth
19:45	McPake 18'; Lloyd 48'	Report		Stadium: McDiarmid Park; Attendance: 1,815; Referee: Grant Irvine

=== Scottish Cup ===
29 November 2025 Third round	Banks O'Dee	0–2	Ross County	Aberdeen
15:00		Report	Hale 19'; White 81'	Stadium: Spain Park; Attendance: 550; Referee: Grant Irvine

17 January 2026 Fourth round	Motherwell	1–0	Ross County	Motherwell
15:00	Maswanhise 62'	Report		Stadium: Fir Park; Attendance: 5,547; Referee: Don Robertson

== Squad statistics ==
=== Captains ===
No.	Pos	Nat	Name	No of games	Notes
31	DF	(Scotland)	Declan Gallagher	24	Club Captain
6	MF	(England)	Connor Randall	13	
23	MF	(Scotland)	Ross Docherty	4	
16	DF	(Scotland)	Alex Iacovitti	1	

=== Appearances ===
As of 1 May 2026

No.	Pos	Nat	Player	Total		Championship		League Cup		Challenge Cup		Scottish Cup	
No.	Pos	Nat	Player	Apps	Goals	Apps	Goals	Apps	Goals	Apps	Goals	Apps	Goals
1	GK	(Scotland) SCO	Ross Laidlaw	9	0	6	0	2	0	0	0	1	0
2	DF	(England) ENG	Ben Crompton	17	0	8+3	0	3+1	0	0+1	0	1	0
3	DF	(Republic of Ireland) IRL	Len O'Sullivan	34	0	20+6	0	4	0	2	0	1+1	0
4	DF	(England) ENG	Akil Wright	28	3	26	3	2	0	0	0	0	0
5	DF	(Poland) POL	Levis Pitan	14	0	12+1	0	0	0	0	0	0+1	0
6	MF	(England) ENG	Connor Randall	36	1	32+1	1	0	0	1+1	0	1	0
7	MF	(Scotland) SCO	Jay Henderson	36	8	20+8	4	4	3	1+1	1	1+1	0
8	MF	(Scotland) SCO	Dean Cornelius	31	0	12+11	0	3+1	0	2	0	2	0
9	FW	(Uganda) UGA	Uche Ikpeazu	9	2	5+4	2	0	0	0	0	0	0
10	MF	(England) ENG	Noah Chilvers	5	1	3+2	1	0	0	0	0	0	0
11	FW	(England) ENG	Kieran Phillips	34	6	15+12	5	1+3	1	0+1	0	1+1	0
12	FW	(England) ENG	Jayden Carbon	12	1	5+7	1	0	0	0	0	0	0
15	DF	(Scotland) SCO	Dylan Smith	30	0	13+9	0	3+1	0	2	0	2	0
16	DF	(Scotland) SCO	Alex Iacovitti	26	2	22+1	2	0	0	2	0	1	0
21	GK	(England) ENG	Brad Foster	5	0	0+1	0	2	0	2	0	0	0
23	MF	(Scotland) SCO	Ross Docherty	34	1	25+2	0	4	0	1+1	1	1	0
24	MF	(England) ENG	Kaedyn Kamara	3	0	1+2	0	0	0	0	0	0	0
26	FW	(Scotland) SCO	Jordan White	42	6	23+12	4	1+2	1	0+2	0	2	1
27	MF	(Scotland) SCO	Ryan Duncan	22	2	16+4	2	0	0	0	0	2	0
28	MF	(Scotland) SCO	Jamie Williamson	0	0	0	0	0	0	0	0	0	0
29	MF	(Scotland) SCO	Miller Thomson	9	1	1+5	1	0	0	2	0	0+1	0
30	GK	(Northern Ireland) NIR	Trevor Carson	30	0	29	0	0	0	0	0	1	0
31	MF	(Scotland) SCO	Declan Gallagher	36	0	30	0	4	0	0+1	0	1	0
34	MF	(Scotland) SCO	Lewis Mackay	0	0	0	0	0	0	0	0	0	0
37	FW	(Scotland) SCO	Joe Coyle	1	2	0	0	0+1	2	0	0	0	0
38	MF	(Scotland) SCO	Jamie Lindsay	32	3	24+5	1	0+1	0	1	2	1	0
43	DF	(Scotland) SCO	Josh Reid	3	0	1+2	0	0	0	0	0	0	0
44	FW	(Scotland) SCO	James Scott	23	0	5+15	0	0	0	1	0	1+1	0
45	DF	(Scotland) SCO	Alister Morrison	0	0	0	0	0	0	0	0	0	0
49	FW	(Scotland) SCO	Calum Brown	1	0	0+1	0	0	0	0	0	0	0
62	DF	(Scotland) SCO	Sean Mackie	9	0	6+3	0	0	0	0	0	0	0
Players who left the club during the season
9	FW	(Northern Ireland) NIR	Ronan Hale	25	12	18+1	7	4	4	0	0	1+1	1
12	MF	(Scotland) SCO	Scott Fraser	16	1	9+4	1	0	0	1+1	0	1	0
14	FW	(Scotland) SCO	Nicky Clark	14	0	2+7	0	2+1	0	2	0	0	0
17	MF	(Scotland) SCO	Gary Mackay-Steven	17	0	5+9	0	0	0	1+1	0	0+1	0
18	MF	(Scotland) SCO	Andrew Macleod	0	0	0	0	0	0	0	0	0	0
19	MF	(Scotland) SCO	Arron Lyall	7	0	0+3	0	2+2	0	0	0	0	0
20	MF	(England) ENG	George Robesten	3	0	0+1	0	0+2	0	0	0	0	0
22	FW	(Scotland) SCO	Adam Emslie	4	0	0	0	3+1	0	0	0	0	0
25	MF	(England) ENG	Jack Wells-Morrison	2	0	0+1	0	0	0	1	0	0	0
27	FW	(Scotland) SCO	Eamonn Brophy	0	0	0	0	0	0	0	0	0	0
32	MF	(Scotland) SCO	Copeland Thain	1	0	0	0	0+1	0	0	0	0	0
35	DF	(Scotland) SCO	Oliver Lamont	0	0	0	0	0	0	0	0	0	0
41	GK	(Scotland) SCO	Jayden Reid	0	0	0	0	0	0	0	0	0	0

=== Goalscorers ===
Rank	No.	Nat.	Po.	Name	Championship	Scottish Cup	League Cup	Challenge Cup	Total
1	9	(Northern Ireland)	FW	Ronan Hale	7	1	4	0	12
2	7	(Scotland)	MF	Jay Henderson	4	0	3	1	8
3	26	(Scotland)	FW	Jordan White	4	1	1	0	6
3	11	(England)	FW	Kieran Phillips	5	0	1	0	6
4	4	(England)	DF	Akil Wright	3	0	0	0	3
4	38	(Scotland)	MF	Jamie Lindsay	1	0	0	2	3
5	9	(Uganda)	FW	Uche Ikpeazu	2	0	0	0	2
5	16	(Scotland)	DF	Alex Iacovitti	2	0	0	0	2
5	27	(Scotland)	MF	Ryan Duncan	2	0	0	0	2
5	37	(Scotland)	FW	Joe Coyle	0	0	2	0	2
6	6	(England)	MF	Connor Randall	1	0	0	0	1
6	10	(England)	MF	Noah Chilvers	1	0	0	0	1
6	12	(England)	MF	Jayden Carbon	1	0	0	0	1
6	12	(Scotland)	MF	Scott Fraser	1	0	0	0	1
6	23	(Scotland)	MF	Ross Docherty	0	0	0	1	1
6	29	(Scotland)	MF	Miller Thomson	1	0	0	0	1
Own goals					1	0	0	0	0
Total					36	2	11	4	53
As of 1 May 2026

== Team statistics ==
=== League table ===
Pos	Team	Pld	W	D	L	GF	GA	GD	Pts	Promotion, qualification or relegation
6	Queen's Park	36	9	14	13	35	48	−13	41	
7	Ayr United	36	8	15	13	38	47	−9	39	
8	Greenock Morton	36	8	14	14	36	52	−16	38	
9	Airdrieonians (R)	36	8	12	16	35	49	−14	36	Qualification for the Championship play-offs
10	Ross County (R)	36	8	10	18	36	57	−21	34	Relegation to League One

Rules for classification: 1) Points; 2) Goal difference; 3) Goals scored; 4) Head-to head points; 5) Head-to-head goal difference; 6) Play-off (only for deciding promotion, play-off participation and relegation).
(R) Relegated

=== League cup table ===
Pos	Team	Pld	W	PW	PL	L	GF	GA	GD	Pts	Qualification	PAR	ROS	STR	QOS	EDI
1	Partick Thistle	4	4	0	0	0	11	2	+9	12	Qualification for the second round	—	—	2–0	2–0	—
2	Ross County	4	2	0	1	1	11	4	+7	7		1–3	—	—	—	8–0
3	Stranraer	4	1	1	1	1	2	3	−1	6		—	p1–1	—	1–0	—
4	Queen of the South	4	1	0	0	3	4	4	0	3		—	0–1	—	—	4–0
5	Edinburgh City	4	0	1	0	3	1	16	−15	2		1–4	—	p0–0	—	—

Rules for classification: 1) goal difference, 2) goals scored, 3) away goals scored, 4) matches won, 5) away matches won, 6) drawing of lots.

== Transfers ==
=== In ===
Date	Player	From	Fee
6 June 2025	(Scotland) Declan Gallagher	(Scotland) Dundee United	Free
10 June 2025	(Scotland) Gary Mackay-Steven	(Scotland) Kilmarnock	Free
16 June 2025	(Scotland) Ross Docherty	(Scotland) Dundee United	Free
19 June 2025	(England) Ben Crompton	(England) Sunderland	Free
21 June 2025	(Scotland) Arron Lyall	(Scotland) Greenock Morton	Free
23 June 2025	(Scotland) Dean Cornelius	(England) Harrogate Town	Free
3 July 2025	(England) Brad Foster	(Wales) Wrexham	Free
4 July 2025	(Republic of Ireland) Len O'Sullivan	(Northern Ireland) Glenavon	Free
4 July 2025	(Scotland) Adam Emslie	(Scotland) Aberdeen	Free
17 July 2025	(Scotland) Nicky Clark	(Scotland) St Johnstone	Free
18 July 2025	(Scotland) Jamie Lindsay	(England) Bristol Rovers	Free
8 August 2025	(Scotland) Alex Iacovitti	(Scotland) St Mirren	Free
8 August 2025	(Scotland) James Scott	(Scotland) St Mirren	Loan
12 September 2025	(Scotland) Scott Fraser	(Scotland) Dundee	Free
25 September 2025	(Northern Ireland) Trevor Carson	(Scotland) Dundee	Loan
30 September 2025	(Scotland) Sean Mackie	(Scotland) Falkirk	Loan
30 September 2025	(Scotland) Ryan Duncan	(Scotland) Aberdeen	Loan
30 September 2025	(Scotland) Miller Thomson	(Scotland) Dundee United	Loan
18 December 2025	(England) Jack Wells-Morrison	(England) Crystal Palace	Free
12 January 2026	(Poland) Levis Pitan	(Poland) Piast Gliwice	Loan
2 February 2026	(Uganda) Uche Ikpeazu	(Scotland) St Johnstone	Free
2 February 2026	(England) Jayden Carbon	(England) Middlesbrough	Loan
2 February 2026	(England) Kaedyn Kamara	(England) Preston North End	Loan

=== Out ===
Date	Player	To	Fee
24 May 2025	(Scotland) Connall Ewan	(Scotland) Elgin City	Free
28 May 2025	(Scotland) Scott Allardice	(Thailand) Ratchaburi	Free
28 May 2025	(Republic of Ireland) James Brown	(Scotland) Kilmarnock	Free
1 June 2025	(Wales) Ryan Leak		Free
4 June 2025	(Wales) Alex Samuel	(Scotland) Partick Thistle	Free
4 June 2025	(Scotland) Logan Ross	(Scotland) Inverness CT	Free
5 June 2025	(Australia) Josh Nisbet	(Netherlands) Roda JC	Free
5 June 2025	(Scotland) Charlie Telfer	(Scotland) Airdrieonians	Free
27 June 2025	(Democratic Republic of the Congo) Michee Efete	(England) Yeovil Town	Free
27 June 2025	(Scotland) Ricki Lamie	(Scotland) Queen's Park	Free
30 June 2025	(Germany) Jordan Amissah	(England) Burton Albion	Undisclosed
1 July 2025	(England) George Harmon	(England) Cheltenham Town	Free
24 July 2025	(Scotland) Jamie Williamson	(Scotland) Strathspey Thistle	Loan
24 July 2025	(Scotland) Calum Brown	(Scotland) Strathspey Thistle	Loan
1 August 2025	(Scotland) Eamonn Brophy	(Scotland) Greenock Morton	Free
8 August 2025	(Scotland) Rio Hastings	(Scotland) Invergordon	Co-operation loan
8 August 2025	(Scotland) Oliver Lamont	(Scotland) Invergordon	Co-operation loan
8 August 2025	(Scotland) Lewis Mackay	(Scotland) Invergordon	Co-operation loan
8 August 2025	(Scotland) Jayden Reid	(Scotland) Invergordon	Co-operation loan
11 August 2025	(Scotland) Copeland Thain	(Scotland) Clachnacuddin	Loan
26 September 2025	(Scotland) Adam Emslie	(Scotland) Cove Rangers	Loan
26 September 2025	(Scotland) Arron Lyall	(Scotland) Greenock Morton	Loan
2 January 2026	(England) George Robesten	(England) Weston-super-Mare	Undisclosed
22 January 2026	(Scotland) Andrew Macleod	(Scotland) Strathspey Thistle	Loan
28 January 2026	(Scotland) Scott Fraser	(Scotland) Brechin City	Free
28 January 2026	(England) Jack Wells-Morrison		Free
29 January 2026	(Northern Ireland) Ronan Hale	(England) Gillingham	Undisclosed
2 February 2026	(Scotland) Nicky Clark	(Scotland) Queen of the South	Free
2 February 2026	(Scotland) Gary Mackay-Steven	(Scotland) Partick Thistle	Free
