= Arron Lyall =

Scottish footballer (born 2003)

Personal information
- Full name: Arron John Lyall
- Date of birth: 27 September 2003 (age 23)
- Place of birth: Renfrew, Scotland
- Position: Winger

Team information
- Current team: Raith Rovers
- Number: 24

Youth career
- St Peters FC

Senior career*
Years	Team	Apps	(Gls)
2019–2024	Rangers	1	(0)
2021	→ Inverness Caledonian Thistle (loan)	2	(0)
2024	→ Airdrieonians (loan)	14	(1)
2024–2025	Greenock Morton	36	(2)
2025–2026	Ross County	3	(0)
2025–2026	→ Greenock Morton (loan)	20	(1)
2026–	Raith Rovers	0	(0)
- * Club domestic league appearances and goals as of 4 May 2026

Arron John Lyall (born 27 September 2003) is a Scottish professional footballer who plays as a midfielder for Scottish Championship club Greenock Morton on loan from Ross County. He previously played for Airdrieonians, on loan from Rangers.

== Career ==
Lyall played through the Rangers Academy, signed a three-year contract with the club on 9 September 2020. On 22 March 2022, he was loaned out to Inverness Caledonian Thistle in the Scottish Championship. He made his career debut on 23 March 2021, in the Scottish Cup, away to Buckie Thistle. Lyall made a further three appearances for Inverness, including two in the Scottish Championship.

On 21 May 2023, he made his professional Rangers debut in a Scottish Premiership match away to Hibernian, as a 89th minute substitute for Ryan Jack. Three days later, Lyall signed a one-year contract extension with Rangers which kept him at the club until the summer of 2024.

Lyall signed a loan deal with Airdrieonians on the 19th of January 2024. The midfielder made his debut as a second-half substitute in a 1-0 victory versus St Johnstone in the Scottish Cup on 20 January 2024.

On 21 June 2024, Lyall joined Scottish Championship club Greenock Morton on a one-year deal.

on 21 June 2025, Lyall joined Scottish Championship club Ross County on a two-year deal. On 26 September 2025, Lyall re-joined Greenock Morton on loan for the remainder of the season.

== Career statistics ==
As of match played 23 January 2026

Appearances and goals by club, season and competition
Club	Season	League			Scottish Cup		League Cup		Other		Total	
Club	Season	Division	Apps	Goals	Apps	Goals	Apps	Goals	Apps	Goals	Apps	Goals
Rangers B	2019–20	—			—		—		1 (Note: Appearance(s) in Scottish Challenge Cup)	0	1	0
Rangers B	2020–21	—			—		—		0	0	0	0
Rangers B	2021–22	—			—		—		0	0	0	0
Rangers B	2022–23	—			—		—		2	1	2	1
Rangers B	2023–24	—			—		—		2	1	2	1
Rangers B	Total		—		—		—		5	2	5	2
Inverness Caledonian Thistle (loan)	2020–21	Scottish Championship	2	0	2	0	—		—		4	0
Rangers	2021–22	Scottish Premiership	0	0	0	0	0	0	0	0	0	0
Rangers	2022–23	Scottish Premiership	1	0	0	0	0	0	0	0	0	0
Rangers	2023–24	Scottish Premiership	0	0	0	0	0	0	0	0	0	0
Rangers	Total		1	0	0	0	0	0	0	0	1	0
Airdrieonians (loan)	2023–24	Scottish Championship	14	1	2	0	—		2 (Note: Appearance(s) in Scottish Premiership play-offs)	1	18	2
Greenock Morton	2024–25	Scottish Championship	36	2	1	0	4	0	3	0	44	2
Ross County	2025–26	Scottish Championship	3	0	—		4	0	—		7	0
Greenock Morton (loan)	2025–26	Scottish Championship	13	1	1	0	—		0	0	14	1
Career total			69	4	6	0	8	0	10	3	93	7
