= Connor Randall =

English footballer (born 1995)

Personal information
- Full name: Connor Steven Randall
- Date of birth: 21 October 1995 (age 31)
- Place of birth: Liverpool, England
- Height: 1.80 m (5 ft 11 in)
- Positions: Right-back; midfielder

Team information
- Current team: Ross County
- Number: 6

Youth career
- 2001–2015: Liverpool

Senior career*
Years	Team	Apps	(Gls)
2015–2019	Liverpool	3	(0)
2015	→ Shrewsbury Town (loan)	1	(0)
2017–2018	→ Heart of Midlothian (loan)	24	(0)
2018	→ Rochdale (loan)	1	(0)
2019–2020	Arda Kardzhali	10	(0)
2020–	Ross County	173	(5)

International career^{‡}
2011	England U17	4	(1)
- * Club domestic league appearances and goals as of 14 October 2026 ‡ National team caps and goals as of 17 September 2015 (UTC)

Connor Steven Randall (born 21 October 1995) is an English professional footballer who plays as a defender or midfielder for Scottish League One club Ross County, whom he captains.

== Club career ==
=== Early career ===
Randall was born and raised in Melling, Merseyside. He attended Melling Primary School and Maghull High School. Randall played for Waddicar Dolphins (managed by his father) from a young age and it was there at the age of six he was spotted and signed for Liverpool; during his academy career, Randall captained the Under-18s and was a regular for the under-21 team from 2013.

On 17 January 2015, he was loaned out to League Two side Shrewsbury Town on a one-month loan deal. He made his Shrewsbury Town debut on 14 February as a 90th-minute substitute, replacing Jermaine Grandison, in a 2–0 win against AFC Wimbledon at the New Meadow which proved to be the only appearance of his loan.

On 17 September 2015, he got his first call up to the Liverpool senior squad for their UEFA Europa League group stage match against Bordeaux, remaining an unused substitute in the 1–1 away draw. On 28 October, Randall made his Reds debut in a 1–0 League Cup fourth round victory against Bournemouth at Anfield. On 2 December, he featured in the next round of the same competition, helping Liverpool thrash Southampton 6–1 at St Mary's. On 9 December 2015, Randall signed a contract extension with Liverpool. On 17 April 2016, he made his Premier League debut for the club, where Liverpool won 2–1 against Bournemouth.

On 28 July 2017, Randall was loaned to Scottish Premiership side Heart of Midlothian until the end of the season. The following season on 23 August 2018, he joined Rochdale on loan until January 2019.

He was released by Liverpool at the end of the 2018–19 season.

On 12 September 2019, Randall joined newly promoted Bulgarian First League side Arda Kardzhali on a two-year deal, in an unexpected move.

Randall moved to Scottish Premiership club Ross County on 25 June 2020. On 30 July 2024 Randall was named club Captain after previous Captain Jack Baldwin left the club that summer.

== International career ==
Randall represented England at under-17 level during the 2011 Nordic Under-17 Football Championship in 2011. He played four matches and scored one goal in the fifth place play-off match against Finland.

== Club statistics ==
As of match played 13 October 2026

Appearances and goals by club, season and competition
Club	Season	League			Cup		League Cup		Other		Total	
Club	Season	Division	Apps	Goals	Apps	Goals	Apps	Goals	Apps	Goals	Apps	Goals
Liverpool	2014–15	Premier League	0	0	0	0	0	0	0	0	0	0
Liverpool	2015–16	Premier League	3	0	2	0	2	0	0	0	7	0
Liverpool	2016–17	Premier League	0	0	1	0	0	0	—		1	0
Liverpool	Total		3	0	3	0	2	0	0	0	8	0
Shrewsbury Town (loan)	2014–15	League Two	1	0	0	0	0	0	0	0	1	0
Heart of Midlothian (loan)	2017–18	Scottish Premiership	24	0	3	0	0	0	—		27	0
Rochdale (loan)	2018–19	EFL League One	1	0	0	0	1	0	1 (Note: Appearances in the EFL Trophy)	0	3	0
Arda Kardzhali	2019–20	Bulgarian First League	10	0	0	0	0	0	—		10	0
Ross County	2020–21	Scottish Premiership	15	0	0	0	2	0	—		17	0
Ross County	2021–22	Scottish Premiership	29	0	1	0	2	0	—		32	0
Ross County	2022–23	Scottish Premiership	24	0	1	0	4	0	2 (Note: Appearances in 2022–23 Scottish Premiership play-offs)	0	31	0
Ross County	2023–24	Scottish Premiership	26	1	1	0	6	1	2 (Note: Appearances in 2023–24 Scottish Premiership play-offs)	0	35	2
Ross County	2024–25	Scottish Premiership	37	1	1	0	3	0	2 (Note: Appearances in 2024–25 Scottish Premiership play-offs)	0	43	1
Ross County	2025–26	Scottish Championship	33	1	1	0	0	0	2 (Note: Appearance(s) in Scottish Challenge Cup)	0	36	1
Ross County	2026–27	Scottish League One	9	2	0	0	3	1	3	0	15	3
Ross County	Total		173	5	5	0	20	2	11	0	209	7
Career total			212	5	11	0	23	2	12	0	258	7
