= Jamie Lindsay (footballer, born 1995) =

Scottish footballer (born 1995)

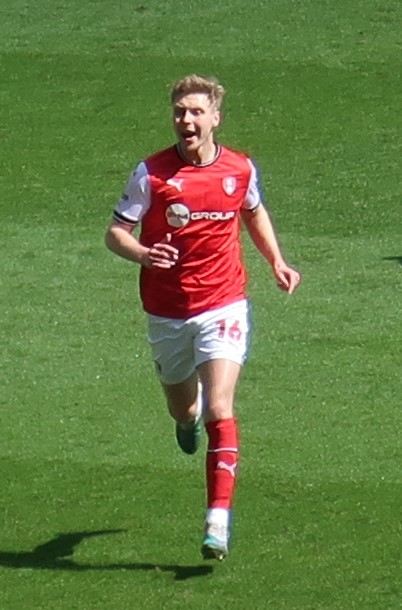

Personal information
- Full name: Jamie Lindsay
- Date of birth: 11 October 1995 (age 31)
- Place of birth: Rutherglen, Scotland
- Position: Midfielder

Team information
- Current team: Ross County
- Number: 38

Youth career
- Motherwell
- –2015: Celtic

Senior career*
Years	Team	Apps	(Gls)
2015–2018	Celtic	0	(0)
2015–2016	→ Dumbarton (loan)	23	(0)
2016–2017	→ Greenock Morton (loan)	31	(0)
2017–2018	→ Ross County (loan)	26	(2)
2018–2019	Ross County	35	(6)
2019–2024	Rotherham United	142	(8)
2024–2025	Bristol Rovers	28	(2)
2025–	Ross County	36	(3)

International career
2011–2012	Scotland U16	2	(0)
2012–2013	Scotland U17	13	(1)
2012–2014	Scotland U19	14	(0)
- * Club domestic league appearances and goals as of 3 September 2026

Jamie William Lindsay (born 11 October 1995) is a Scottish professional footballer who plays as a midfielder for Scottish League One club Ross County. Lindsay has previously played for Celtic, Dumbarton, Greenock Morton, Ross County, Rotherham United and Bristol Rovers, and has represented Scotland in youth internationals.

== Club career ==
Raised in Larkhall, Lindsay started his career with Celtic. He played regularly for their development sides including scoring against A.C. Milan in the UEFA Youth League.

He joined Scottish Championship side Dumbarton on loan in July 2015. Making his senior debut for the club in a 3–2 victory over Morton on 26 July 2015. He extended his loan deal for the rest of the season in January after winning the club's November/December player of the month award. He won the club's Young Player of the Year award before returning to Celtic.

Lindsay joined Morton on loan in July 2016 for the season. He scored his first senior goal on his debut against Berwick Rangers

On 3 July 2017, Lindsay joined Ross County on loan until the end of the season. He scored his first career professional league goal during this time, in a 2–1 away win at Dundee. He signed a permanent deal with the Staggies in June 2018.

=== Rotherham United ===
On 24 July 2019, Lindsay joined EFL League One side Rotherham United for an undisclosed fee, signing a three-year contract with the club.

In May 2024, Rotherham confirmed that Lindsay would be departing the club upon the expiration of his contract. Despite having been offered a new contract, new manager Steve Evans confirmed that personal terms could not be agreed.

=== Bristol Rovers ===
On 12 July 2024, Lindsay signed for League One club Bristol Rovers on a three-year deal with the option for a further season. The move saw him reunite with former Rotherham manager Matt Taylor. On 1 October 2024, he scored his first goal for the club with the second in a 3–2 victory over Charlton Athletic. Following the replacement of Matt Taylor with Iñigo Calderón as head coach in December 2024, Lindsay struggled for game time, failing to appear from 22 February until an appearance from the bench on the final day of the season. On 8 June 2025, he departed the club having had his contract terminated by mutual consent.

=== Return to Ross County ===
On 18 July 2025, Lindsay returned to Scottish Championship side Ross County on a two-year deal.

== Career statistics ==
As of 3 September 2026

Appearances and goals by club, season and competition
Club	Season	League			Scottish Cup		League Cup		Other		Total	
Club	Season	Division	Apps	Goals	Apps	Goals	Apps	Goals	Apps	Goals	Apps	Goals
Celtic	2015–16	Scottish Premiership	0	0	0	0	0	0	0	0	0	0
Celtic	2016–17	Scottish Premiership	0	0	0	0	0	0	0	0	0	0
Celtic	2017–18	Scottish Premiership	0	0	0	0	0	0	0	0	0	0
Celtic	Total		0	0	0	0	0	0	0	0	0	0
Dumbarton (loan)	2015–16	Scottish Championship	23	0	3	0	1	0	1 (Note: Appearances in the Scottish Challenge Cup)	0	28	0
Greenock Morton (loan)	2016–17	Scottish Championship	31	0	3	2	4	1	2 (Note: Appearances in the Premiership play-offs)	0	40	3
Ross County (loan)	2017–18	Scottish Premiership	26	2	1	0	5	0	—		32	2
Ross County	2018–19	Scottish Championship	35	6	3	0	5	1	5	2	48	9
Ross County	2019–20	Scottish Premiership	0	0	0	0	1	0	—		1	0
Ross County	Total		35	6	3	0	6	1	5	2	49	9
Rotherham United	2019–20	League One	22	1	1	0	2	0	3 (Note: Appearance(s) in EFL Trophy)	0	28	1
Rotherham United	2020–21	Championship	35	3	1	0	1	0	—		37	3
Rotherham United	2021–22	League One	28	1	2	0	0	0	5	0	35	1
Rotherham United	2022–23	Championship	36	2	1	0	2	0	—		39	2
Rotherham United	2023–24	Championship	21	1	1	0	0	0	—		22	1
Rotherham United	Total		142	8	6	0	5	0	8	0	161	8
Bristol Rovers	2024–25	League One	28	2	3	1	1	0	1	0	33	3
Ross County	2025–26	Scottish Championship	32	1	1	0	1	0	1	2	35	3
Ross County	2026–27	Scottish League One	4	2	0	0	5	2	2	0	11	4
Ross County	Total		36	3	1	0	6	2	3	2	46	7
Career total			321	21	20	3	28	4	20	4	389	32

== Honours ==
Ross County

- Scottish Championship: 2018–19
- Scottish Challenge Cup: 2018–19

Rotherham United

- League One runner-up: 2021–22
- EFL Trophy: 2021–22
