= Dylan Smith (Scottish footballer) =

Scottish footballer (born 2006)

Personal information
- Date of birth: 21 June 2006 (age 20)
- Place of birth: Inverness, Scotland
- Height: 1.85 m (6 ft 1 in)
- Position: Defender

Team information
- Current team: Ross County
- Number: 15

Youth career
- Clachnacuddin
- Ross County

Senior career*
Years	Team	Apps	(Gls)
2022–	Ross County	58	(2)
2024–2025	→ Arbroath (loan)	11	(1)

International career^{‡}
2022–2023	Scotland U17	6	(0)
2023–2025	Scotland U19	8	(0)
2025–	Scotland U21	4	(0)
- * Club domestic league appearances and goals as of 19 November 2026 ‡ National team caps and goals as of 19 November 2026

Dylan Smith (born 21 June 2006) is a Scottish professional footballer who plays as a defender for Scottish Premiership club Ross County and is a Scotland U21 international.

== Career ==
=== Ross County ===
Dylan Smith signed a two-year apprenticeship with Ross County on 23 June 2022 after impressing with the clubs under-18 team. Smith made his debut for County in the Scottish Premiership against Rangers coming on in the 84th minute for Kazeem Olaigbe.

=== Arbroath (loan) ===
On 30 September 2024, Smith joined Scottish League One club, Arbroath on a loan deal until the end of the season. On 21 January 2025, Ross County chose to recall Smith from his loan.

== Career statistics ==
As of match played 7 November 2026

Appearances and goals by club, season and competition
Club	Season	League			Cup		League Cup		Other		Total	
Club	Season	Division	Apps	Goals	Apps	Goals	Apps	Goals	Apps	Goals	Apps	Goals
Ross County	2022–23	Scottish Premiership	13	0	0	0	0	0	1 (Note: Appearances in Scottish Premiership play-offs)	0	14	0
Ross County	2023–24	Scottish Premiership	6	0	0	0	2	0	—		8	0
Ross County	2024–25	Scottish Premiership	6	0	0	0	1	0	1 (Note: Appearances in Scottish Premiership play-offs)	0	8	0
Ross County	2025–26	Scottish Championship	21	0	2	0	4	0	2 (Note: Appearance(s) in Scottish Challenge Cup)	0	30	0
Ross County	2026–27	Scottish League One	11	2	0	0	5	0	5 (Note: Appearance(s) in Scottish Challenge Cup)	1	21	3
Ross County	Total		58	2	2	0	12	0	9	1	81	3
Arbroath (loan)	2024–25	Scottish League One	11	1	1	0	0	0	—		12	1
Career total			69	3	3	0	12	0	9	1	93	4
