= Richard Chin =

Malaysian footballer (born 2002)

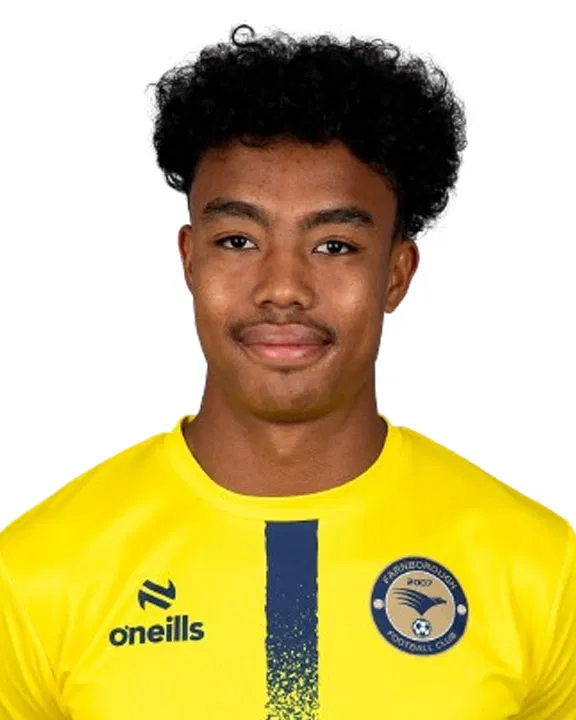
- Chin with Farnborough in 2024

Personal information
- Full name: Richard Li Hua Chin
- Date of birth: 15 October 2002 (age 24)
- Place of birth: Bexley, England
- Positions: Defensive midfielder; full-back

Team information
- Current team: Ross County
- Number: 7

Youth career
- 2008–2021: Charlton Athletic

Senior career*
Years	Team	Apps	(Gls)
2021–2024	Charlton Athletic	5	(0)
2023	→ Dartford (loan)	7	(0)
2023	→ Dartford (loan)	6	(3)
2024	→ Bath City (loan)	3	(1)
2024–2025	Farnborough	42	(7)
2025–2026	Raith Rovers	22	(2)
2026–	Ross County	15	(6)

International career^{‡}
2025–	Malaysia	3	(2)
- * Club domestic league appearances and goals as of 22 November 2026 ‡ National team caps and goals as of 08:45, 17 November 2026 (UTC)

Richard Li Hua Chin (born 15 October 2002) is a professional footballer who plays as a defensive midfielder or full-back for Scottish League One club Ross County. Born in England, he plays for the Malaysia national team.

== Early life ==
Chin is of Malaysian and Seychellois descent; his father is Malaysian Chinese and his mother is from the Seychelles.

Between 2014 and 2021, Chin attended Beths Grammar School in Bexley, England. In 2017, Chin helped the school to the Under-14s English Schools Cup alongside future Charlton teammate Euan Williams, as well as Lewis Bate and Samuel Edozie, who went on to play for Leeds United and Southampton respectively.

== Career ==
=== Charlton Athletic ===
Chin started his career with Charlton Athletic, joining the club at the age of six. He signed his first professional contract with the club in July 2021.

Chin made his first-team debut in the EFL Trophy on 10 November 2021, starting in a 1–0 defeat to Leyton Orient.

On 13 September 2022, Chin started his first League One match, playing the first 72 minutes in a 1–1 draw with Forest Green Rovers. In doing so, Chin became the first person of Malaysian heritage to play in England's third tier.

On 22 March 2023, Charlton took up the extension option in his contract to keep him at the club until the summer of 2024.

On 3 May 2024, it was confirmed that Chin would leave Charlton Athletic when his contract expired.

==== Loans to Dartford ====
On 23 March 2023, Chin joined Dartford on loan for the rest of the 2022–23 season. On 1 April 2023, Chin made his debut with the National League South side in a 4–0 win against Dulwich Hamlet.

On 24 November 2023, Chin returned to Dartford on an initial month's loan. On 25 November 2023, Chin scored his first goal for the team in a 3–0 win against Torquay United.

==== Loan to Bath City ====
In February 2024, Chin joined Bath City on loan for the remainder of the 2023–24 season. On 10 February 2024, Chin made his debut for the National League South side in a 1–0 win against Dartford, featuring in the starting lineup. On 17 February 2024, Chin scored his first goal for the team in a 3–1 win against St Albans City.

=== Farnborough ===
On 1 August 2024, Chin joined National League South side Farnborough following his release from Charlton. On 20 August 2024, he scored a goal for the team in a 2–0 win against Eastbourne Borough.

=== Raith Rovers ===
On 17 June 2025, Chin joined Scottish Championship side Raith Rovers for an undisclosed fee.

=== Ross County ===
On 9 June 2026, Chin joined Scottish League One side Ross County for an undisclosed fee.

== International career ==
As a result of his heritage, Chin is eligible to represent Malaysia, Seychelles, and England internationally. He expressed his interest in representing Malaysia early in his career.

On 29 August 2025, he was named in the Malaysia squad for a training camp ahead of friendly matches against Singapore and Palestine. Ahead of the friendly against Palestine, he expressed his hope to make his debut and contribute to the team. He made his debut for Malaysia on 8 September 2025, coming on as a substitute in the 79th minute to replace Quentin Cheng in a 1–0 win over Palestine at the Sultan Ibrahim Stadium, Johor Bahru.

Chin scored his first international goals on 17 November 2026 in a friendly match against Yemen at the Zhaoqing New District Sports Center Stadium, Zhaoqing.

== Personal life ==
Chin converted to Islam in November 2024, having recited the Shahada privately on his own initiative. News of his conversion became public in September 2025 following media coverage of a video showing him performing prayers at the Sultan Abu Bakar Mosque in Johor Bahru alongside his national teammates and members of the Palestinian squad.

== Career statistics ==
=== Club ===
As of 11 August 2026

Appearances and goals by club, season and competition
Club	Season	League			National Cup		League Cup		Other		Total	
Club	Season	Division	Apps	Goals	Apps	Goals	Apps	Goals	Apps	Goals	Apps	Goals
Charlton Athletic	2021–22	League One	0	0	0	0	0	0	1 (Note: Appearance in the EFL Trophy)	0	1	0
Charlton Athletic	2022–23	League One	5	0	3	0	3	0	4	0	15	0
Charlton Athletic	2023–24	League One	0	0	0	0	1	0	1	0	2	0
Charlton Athletic	Total		5	0	3	0	4	0	6	0	18	0
Dartford (loan)	2022–23	National League South	7	0	—		—		1 (Note: Appearance in the National League South play-offs)	0	8	0
Dartford (loan)	2023–24	National League South	6	3	—		—		1 (Note: Appearance in the Kent Senior Cup)	0	7	3
Dartford (loan)	Total		13	3	0	0	0	0	2	0	15	3
Bath City (loan)	2023–24	National League South	3	1	—		—		1 (Note: Appearance in the Somerset Premier Cup)	0	4	1
Farnborough	2024–25	National League South	42	7	1	0	—		1 (Note: Appearance in the FA Trophy)	0	44	7
Raith Rovers	2025–26	Scottish Championship	22	2	0	0	3	0	4 (Note: Appearance in the Scottish Challenge Cup)	0	29	2
Ross County	2026–27	Scottish League One	2	0	0	0	4	1	1	1	7	2
Career total			87	13	4	0	11	1	15	1	117	15

=== International ===
As of match played 17 November 2026

Appearances and goals by national team and year
National team	Year	Apps	Goals
Malaysia	2025	1	0
Malaysia	2026	2	2
Total		3	2

==== International goals ====
No.	Date	Venue	Opponent	Score	Result	Competition
1.	17 November 2026	Zhaoqing New District Sports Center Stadium, Zhaoqing, China	Yemen	1–0	2–1	Friendly
2.	17 November 2026	Zhaoqing New District Sports Center Stadium, Zhaoqing, China	Yemen	2–0	2–1	Friendly

== Honours ==
Raith Rovers

- Scottish Challenge Cup: 2025–26
