= Alex Iacovitti =

Association football player (born 1997)

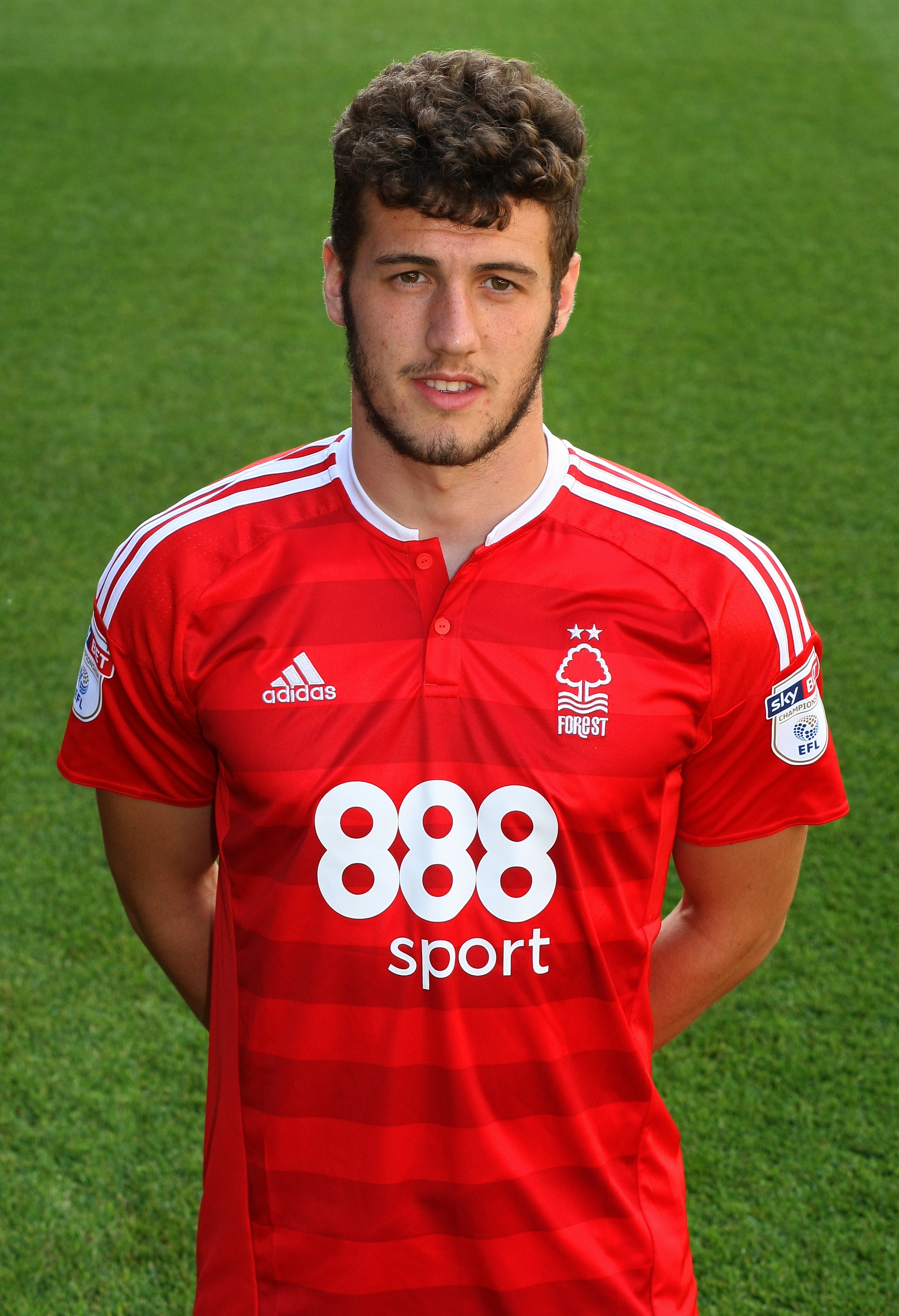
- Iacovitti with Nottingham Forest in 2016

Personal information
- Full name: Alexander Iacovitti
- Date of birth: 2 September 1997 (age 29)
- Place of birth: Nottingham, England
- Height: 1.93 m (6 ft 4 in)
- Position: Centre-back

Youth career
- 2009–2019: Nottingham Forest

Senior career*
Years	Team	Apps	(Gls)
2016–2019	Nottingham Forest	2	(0)
2016–2017	→ Mansfield Town (loan)	8	(0)
2017–2018	→ Forest Green Rovers (loan)	14	(1)
2019	→ Oldham Athletic (loan)	9	(1)
2019–2020	Oldham Athletic	24	(0)
2020–2023	Ross County	103	(7)
2023–2024	Port Vale	31	(1)
2024–2025	St Mirren	14	(1)
2025–2026	Ross County	23	(2)

International career
2014	Scotland U17	6	(0)
2015–2016	Scotland U19	9	(0)
2017	Scotland U20	5	(0)
2016–2017	Scotland U21	4	(0)
- * Club domestic league appearances and goals as of 17 May 2026

Alexander Iacovitti (born 2 September 1997) is a Scottish professional footballer who plays as a centre-back.

Iacovitti won caps with Scotland up to under-21 level and made his debut at club level for Nottingham Forest in August 2016. He spent the first half of the 2016–17 season on loan at Mansfield Town and the first half of the 2017–18 campaign on loan at Forest Green Rovers. He joined Oldham Athletic on loan in January 2019, making the deal permanent four months later. He signed with Scottish Premiership club Ross County in June 2020, where he would play 116 games throughout three seasons. He joined Port Vale in July 2023. He returned to the Scottish Premiership in July 2024 after being signed by St Mirren for an undisclosed fee, before returning to Ross County in August 2025.

== Club career ==
=== Nottingham Forest ===
Iacovitti joined the Academy of Nottingham Forest at the age eleven, becoming an ever-present in the under-18 team that reached the play-off semi-final and FA Youth Cup quarter-final. Following the departure of manager Dougie Freedman, Iacovitti was linked with a move to Aston Villa in August 2015, where former Forest academy boss Kevin MacDonald was now assistant manager. He remained in Nottingham, however, and made his professional debut for the club on 6 August 2016, starting at left-back under Philippe Montanier in a 4–3 win over Burton Albion at the City Ground. On 31 August, Iacovitti joined League Two club Mansfield Town on loan for the 2016–17 season. Stags manager Adam Murray had been in need of a centre-half following a hamstring injury to Kyle Howkins. Iacovitti made his debut at Field Mill on 10 September in a 1–0 defeat to Barnet. On 12 November, Iacovitti was shown a red card in the 74th-minute away at Portsmouth after a late challenge on Michael Doyle; a goal down at the time, Mansfield went on to lose the game 4–0 having also had Howkins dismissed. This was his last appearance for the club and he returned to Nottingham early from his loan spell on 1 January; Steve Evans, who had replaced Murray as manager in November, cited the reason as a lack of playing time.

On 31 July 2017, Iacovitti was loaned to League Two club Forest Green Rovers for the 2017–18 season. He scored his first goal in senior football on 18 November, when his 93rd-minute winner secured a 3–2 victory over Crewe Alexandra at The New Lawn and sent manager Mark Cooper into a celebratory dash down the touchline. He featured a total of 19 times for Forest Green. He was linked with a move to Notts County before Kevin Nolan's departure in August 2018.

=== Oldham Athletic ===
On 28 January 2019, Iacovitti joined League Two side Oldham Athletic on loan for the remainder of the 2018–19 season. He played at centre-half and left-back, and credited senior players Peter Clarke and David Wheater with aiding his development. Iacovitti was released by Forest at the end of the season and on 21 May 2019, Iacovitti joined Oldham Athletic permanently on a two-year deal, with an option for a further year. However, having been initially signed by Pete Wild, club owner Abdallah Lemsagam had promised the contract to Iacovitti without consulting stand-in manager Paul Scholes, causing Scholes to quit in protest at ownership interference in first-team matters. Iacovitti made 30 appearances across the 2019–20 campaign under Laurent Banide and Dino Maamria, scoring one goal in the EFL Trophy. His contract was terminated by mutual consent on 26 June 2020.

=== Ross County ===
On 26 June 2020, Iacovitti joined Scottish Premiership club Ross County on a permanent contract. He made his debut at Victoria Park on 3 August in a 1–0 win over Motherwell. Speaking in September, manager Stuart Kettlewell said that Iacovitti had "flown under the radar" with some strong performances at the start of the 2020–21 season. He maintained his first-team place under new manager John Hughes and ended the campaign with four goals in 42 games. He started the 2021–22 season with two goals in two games, ending up with four goals in 33 appearances.

He signed a new deal with the club in June 2022, having impressed manager Malky Mackay with his consistency and professionalism. He formed a strong central defensive partnership with Jack Baldwin, leading Mackay to say that Iacovitti had been among his most consistent performers since his arrival at the club. He scored four goals in 41 games in the 2022–23 season, with two of his goals coming in defeats at home to Celtic. County finished in the relegation/promotion play-off place at the end of the campaign, which the club won. However, Iacovitti was unable to feature due to injury.

=== Port Vale ===
On 23 June 2023, Iacovitti agreed on a two-year deal with League One side Port Vale, due to start on 1 July; manager Andy Crosby and director of football david Flitcroft emphasised the player's strength and physical presence, in addition to his character. On 30 September, following a good start to the campaign, he sustained a calf injury in a 1–0 defeat to Bolton Wanderers at Vale Park which saw him ruled out for a minimum of eight weeks. He initially struggled for form upon his return to fitness before looking more assured as the weeks went by. He featured 38 times in the 2023–24 season as the "Valiants" were relegated into League Two.

=== St Mirren ===
On 16 July 2024, Iacovitti returned to the Scottish Premiership after signing a two-year deal with St Mirren, who paid Port Vale an undisclosed transfer fee. Manager Stephen Robinson cited the need to add experience to his young squad, as well as a balance between left and right-footed defenders. Iacovitti said that the chance to play European football appealed to him. He scored on his debut for the Buddies in a 4–1 win over Valur in a UEFA Conference League qualification game at St Mirren Park. He scored again off the bench in the away leg of the next qualifying round, in Bergen against SK Brann. He suffered an injury early in the 2024–25 season, which kept him out of action until Christmas. Charles Dunne was re-signed as cover. Robinson said that Iacovitti would provide "leadership and aggression" upon his return to the first XI. However, Iacovitti aggravated his hamstring injury in January and was sidelined for a further two months. On 8 August 2025, Iacovitti left St Mirren by mutual consent after making 23 appearances in all competitions.

=== Return to Ross County ===
On 8 August 2025, Iacovitti rejoined Ross County on a one-year deal after being signed by Don Cowie, who was the assistant manager during his previous spell at the club. County found themselves five points adrift at the foot of the Scottish Championship at Christmas, and Iacovitti said that "the only way we can get out of this is by grafting, and that's what we're doing". He played 26 games in the 2025–26 season, which culminated in relegation. Iacovitti was one of six players that were released in the summer.

== International career ==
Born in England to an Italian father and a Scottish mother, Iacovitti made his debut for the Scotland under-19 team in a 1–0 victory over Bulgaria on 4 September 2015. He won nine caps at under-19 level over a seven-month period, with five games being in Scotland's unsuccessful 2016 UEFA European Under-19 Championship qualification campaign. He was capped at under-20 level in a 3–2 defeat to the Czech Republic on 31 May 2017. He won a further four caps at under-20 level, featuring in the 2017 Toulon Tournament where Scotland finished third. He won his first under-21 cap in a 2–0 defeat to Iceland on 5 October 2016. In total he won four caps at under-21 level, including two 2017 UEFA European Under-21 Championship qualification matches.

== Style of play ==
Iacovitti is a central defender, though he is also able to play as a left-back. A threat from set pieces due to his height, he has good mental attributes and is a leader at the back. He has pace. He is comfortable on the ball, leaving him able to carry the ball out of defence with his left foot.

== Career statistics ==
As of match played 25 April 2026

Appearances and goals by club, season and competition
Club	Season	League			National cup (Note: Includes FA Cup, Scottish Cup)		League cup (Note: Includes EFL Cup, Scottish League Cup)		Other		Total	
Club	Season	Division	Apps	Goals	Apps	Goals	Apps	Goals	Apps	Goals	Apps	Goals
Nottingham Forest	2016–17	Championship	2	0	0	0	0	0	—		2	0
Nottingham Forest	2017–18	Championship	0	0	0	0	0	0	—		0	0
Nottingham Forest	2018–19	Championship	0	0	0	0	0	0	—		0	0
Nottingham Forest	Total		2	0	0	0	0	0	0	0	2	0
Mansfield Town (loan)	2016–17	League Two	8	0	0	0	0	0	0	0	8	0
Forest Green Rovers (loan)	2017–18	League Two	14	1	1	0	0	0	4 (Note: Appearance(s) in the EFL Trophy)	0	19	1
Oldham Athletic (loan)	2018–19	League Two	9	1	0	0	0	0	0	0	9	1
Oldham Athletic	2019–20	League Two	24	0	2	0	1	0	3	1	30	1
Oldham Athletic	Total		33	1	2	0	1	0	3	1	39	2
Ross County	2020–21	Scottish Premiership	36	2	0	0	6	2	—		42	4
Ross County	2021–22	Scottish Premiership	31	2	0	0	2	2	—		33	4
Ross County	2022–23	Scottish Premiership	36	3	0	0	5	1	—		41	4
Ross County	Total		103	7	0	0	13	5	0	0	116	12
Port Vale	2023–24	League One	31	1	2	0	3	0	2	0	38	1
St Mirren	2024–25	Scottish Premiership	14	1	1	0	1	0	3 (Note: Appearance(s) in the UEFA Conference League)	2	19	3
St Mirren	2025–26	Scottish Premiership	0	0	—		4	0	—		4	0
St Mirren	Total		14	1	1	0	5	0	3	2	23	3
Ross County	2025–26	Scottish Championship	23	2	1	0	—		2 (Note: Appearance(s) in the Scottish Challenge Cup)	0	26	2
Career total			228	13	7	0	22	5	14	3	271	21
