= Andrew Macleod (footballer) =

Scottish footballer (born 2005)

Personal information
- Date of birth: 31 January 2005 (age 21)
- Place of birth: Stornoway, Scotland
- Position: Midfielder

Team information
- Current team: Ross County
- Number: 18

Youth career
- –2019: Back
- 2019–2022: Ross County

Senior career*
Years	Team	Apps	(Gls)
2022–	Ross County	4	(0)
2022–2023	→ Clachnacuddin (loan)	5	(0)
2023	→ Brora Rangers (loan)	4	(0)
2023–2024	→ Nairn County (loan)	27	(8)
2024–2025	→ Brora Rangers (loan)	9	(6)
- * Club domestic league appearances and goals

Andrew Macleod (born 31 January 2005) is a Scottish professional footballer who plays as a midfielder for Scottish League One side Ross County. He previously had loan spells at Highland League clubs Clachnacuddin, Brora Rangers (twice) and Nairn County.

== Career ==
=== Ross County ===
In 2019, Macleod joined Ross County's youth system at 13 years old from his local club, Back. Macleod signed his first full–time contract in 2022 at 17 years old. On 13 July 2024, Macleod made his debut for the club in a Scottish League Cup 3–1 victory against Stranraer.

=== Loans ===
On 12 September 2022, Macleod was loaned out to Highland League side, Clachnacuddin. But after injury's setting him back on 5 January 2022, Macleod was recalled to Ross County.

On 6 January 2022, Macleod was loaned out to Highland League side, Brora Rangers.

On 12 July 2023, Macleod was loaned out to another Highland League side, Nairn County. He played a crucial role in taking the team to the North of Scotland Cup final but was not allowed play in it as it was against his parent club, Ross County.

On 3 October 2024, Macleod joined Brora Rangers on loan for the second time in his career.

== Career statistics ==
As of match played 25 August 2026

Appearances and goals by club, season and competition
Club	Season	League			Cup		League Cup		Other		Total	
Club	Season	Division	Apps	Goals	Apps	Goals	Apps	Goals	Apps	Goals	Apps	Goals
Ross County	2024–25	Scottish Premiership	2	0	0	0	4	0	—		6	0
Ross County	2025–26	Scottish Championship	0	0	0	0	0	0	—		0	0
Ross County	2026–27	Scottish League One	2	0	0	0	2	0	2 (Note: Appearance(s) in Scottish Challenge Cup)	0	6	0
Ross County	Total		4	0	0	0	6	0	2	0	12	0
Career total			4	0	0	0	6	0	2	0	12	0

== Honours ==
Nairn County

- North of Scotland Cup: 2023–24
