= Josh Reid =

Scottish footballer

Personal information
- Full name: Joshua Kelman Reid
- Date of birth: 3 May 2002 (age 24)
- Place of birth: Dingwall, Scotland
- Position: Left-back

Team information
- Current team: Ross County
- Number: 43

Youth career
- 2010–2020: Ross County

Senior career*
Years	Team	Apps	(Gls)
2020–2021	Ross County	20	(0)
2021–2023	Coventry City	0	(0)
2023	→ Stevenage (loan)	1	(0)
2023–	Ross County	36	(1)
2025	→ Partick Thistle (loan)	9	(0)

International career^{‡}
2022	Scotland U21	3	(0)
- * Club domestic league appearances and goals as of 20 November 2026 ‡ National team caps and goals as of 22:56, 22 June 2023 (UTC)

Joshua Kelman Reid (born 3 May 2002) is a Scottish professional footballer who plays as a defender for Scottish League One club Ross County.

== Career ==
=== Ross County ===
Reid began his career at Ross County joining the academy in 2010 playing at various youth levels before being called up to the first team in the summer of 2020 following regular left back Sean Kelly's departure from the club. He made his debut for Ross County against Motherwell in the opening day of the Scottish Premiership season, starting the game in left-back. Five days later he started in County's 1–0 win away to Hamilton Academical establishing himself as the clubs regular left back.

=== Coventry City ===
On 28 January 2021, Reid joined English side Coventry City for an undisclosed fee, on a three-and-a-half-year deal.

=== Stevenage loan ===
Reid joined EFL League Two club Stevenage on loan from Coventry City until the end of the 2022–23 season.

=== Return to Ross County ===
On 26 June 2023, Reid returned to Ross County from Coventry City for an undisclosed fee, after signing a three-year deal with the club, and having failed to make any progress with the EFL Championship Club.

=== Partick Thistle (loan) ===
Reid joined Scottish Championship club Partick Thistle on loan until the end of the season in February 2025.

== Career statistics ==
As of match played on 14 November 2026

Club statistics
Club	Season	League			National cup		League cup		Other		Total	
Club	Season	Division	Apps	Goals	Apps	Goals	Apps	Goals	Apps	Goals	Apps	Goals
Ross County Under 21s	2019–20	—	0	0	0	0	0	0	2 (Note: Appearances in the Scottish Challenge Cup)	0	2	0
Ross County	2020–21	Scottish Premiership	20	0	0	0	4	0	—		24	0
Coventry City	2020–21	EFL Championship	0	0	0	0	0	0	—		0	0
Coventry City	2021–22	EFL Championship	0	0	0	0	1	0	—		1	0
Coventry City	2022–23	EFL Championship	0	0	0	0	0	0	—		0	0
Coventry City	Total		0	0	0	0	1	0	0	0	1	0
Stevenage (loan)	2022–23	EFL League Two	1	0	0	0	0	0	—		1	0
Ross County	2023–24	Scottish Premiership	19	0	1	0	4	0	—		24	0
Ross County	2024–25	Scottish Premiership	6	0	0	0	3	0	—		9	0
Ross County	2025–26	Scottish Championship	3	0	0	0	0	0	—		3	0
Ross County	2026–27	Scottish League One	8	1	0	0	2	0	6	1	16	2
Ross County	Total		36	1	1	0	9	0	6	1	52	2
Partick Thistle (loan)	2024–25	Scottish Championship	9	0	0	0	0	0	—		9	0
Career totals			66	1	1	0	14	0	8	1	89	2
