= Akil Wright =

English footballer (born 1996)

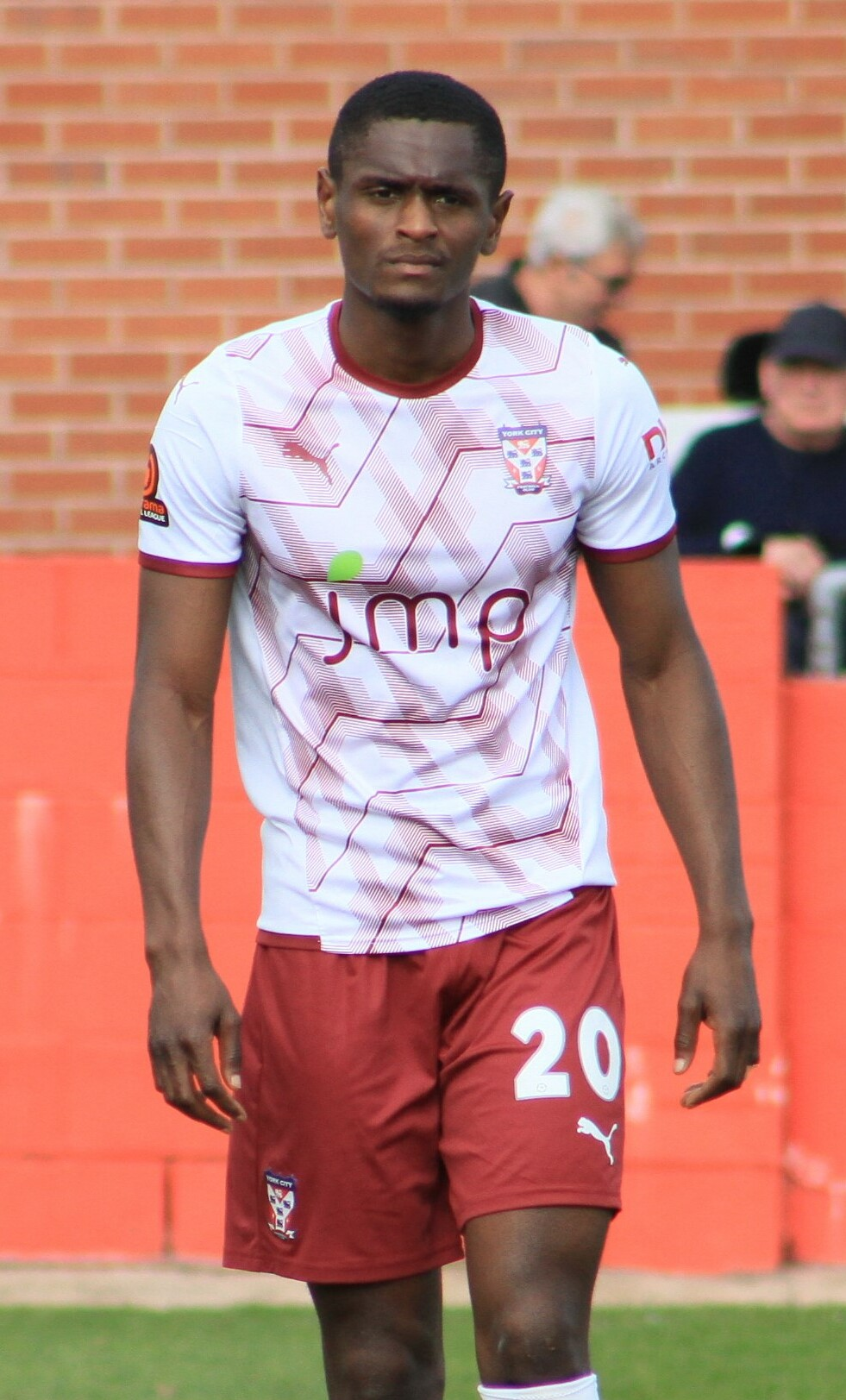
- Akil Wright, York City FC

Personal information
- Full name: Akil Valentine Wright
- Date of birth: 13 May 1996 (age 30)
- Place of birth: Derby, Derbyshire, England
- Height: 6 ft 1 in (1.85 m)
- Position: Defender

Team information
- Current team: Ross County
- Number: 4

Youth career
- Sheffield United

Senior career*
| Years | Team | Apps | (Gls) |
| 2014–2015 | Ilkeston Town | | |
| 2015–2018 | Fleetwood Town | 0 | (0) |
| 2015 | → AFC Fylde (loan) | 3 | (1) |
| 2016–2017 | → Barrow (loan) | 24 | (1) |
| 2017–2018 | → Wrexham (loan) | 19 | (0) |
| 2018–2020 | Wrexham | 69 | (7) |
| 2020–2022 | York City | 54 | (7) |
| 2022–2024 | Stockport County | 67 | (3) |
| 2024– | Ross County | 75 | (9) |
- * Club domestic league appearances and goals as of 08:25, 19 October 2026 (UTC)

Akil Valentine Wright (born 13 May 1996) is an English professional footballer who plays as a defender for Scottish League One club Ross County.

== Career ==
Wright started his senior career at Northern Premier League club Ilkeston before moving to Fleetwood Town for an undisclosed fee.

Over the following 3 years, Wright would be loaned out to non-league teams AFC Fylde, Barrow and Wrexham before signing permanently for Wrexham on 3 January 2018.

On 16 September 2020, Wright signed for York City following his release from Wrexham.

Wright signed for League Two club Stockport County on 17 July 2022, making his debut on 3 September in a 1–0 home win against AFC Wimbledon.

On 8 July 2024, Wright signed for Scottish Premiership side Ross County for an undisclosed fee, joining on a three-year deal.

== Career statistics ==
As of match played 17 October 2026

Appearances and goals by club, season and competition
| Club | Season | League | | | Domestic Cup | | League Cup | | Other | | Total | |
| Club | Season | Division | Apps | Goals | Apps | Goals | Apps | Goals | Apps | Goals | Apps | Goals |
|---|---|---|---|---|---|---|---|---|---|---|---|---|
| Fleetwood Town | 2015–16 | League One | 0 | 0 | 0 | 0 | 0 | 0 | — | | 0 | 0 |
| Fleetwood Town | 2016–17 | League One | 0 | 0 | 0 | 0 | 0 | 0 | — | | 0 | 0 |
| Fleetwood Town | 2017–18 | League One | 0 | 0 | 0 | 0 | 0 | 0 | — | | 0 | 0 |
| Fleetwood Town | Total | | 0 | 0 | 0 | 0 | 0 | 0 | 0 | 0 | 0 | 0 |
| AFC Fylde (loan) | 2015–16 | National League North | 3 | 1 | 0 | 0 | 0 | 0 | — | | 3 | 1 |
| Barrow (loan) | 2016–17 | National League | 24 | 1 | 2 | 0 | 0 | 0 | — | | 26 | 1 |
| Wrexham (loan) | 2017–18 | National League | 19 | 0 | 0 | 0 | 0 | 0 | — | | 19 | 0 |
| Wrexham | 2017–18 | National League | 11 | 0 | 0 | 0 | 0 | 0 | — | | 11 | 0 |
| Wrexham | 2018–19 | National League | 43 | 5 | 3 | 0 | 0 | 0 | 1 | 0 | 47 | 5 |
| Wrexham | 2019–20 | National League | 15 | 2 | 4 | 0 | 0 | 0 | 1 | 0 | 20 | 2 |
| Wrexham | Total | | 88 | 7 | 7 | 0 | 0 | 0 | 2 | 0 | 97 | 7 |
| York City | 2020–21 | National League North | | | | | | | | | | |
| York City | 2021–22 | National League North | | | 1 | 0 | | | | | | |
| York City | Total | | 54 | 7 | 1 | 0 | 0 | 0 | 0 | 0 | 55 | 7 |
| Stockport County | 2022–23 | League Two | 37 | 1 | 4 | 1 | 0 | 0 | 5 | 0 | 46 | 2 |
| Stockport County | 2023–24 | League Two | 27 | 2 | 3 | 0 | 1 | 0 | 4 | 0 | 35 | 2 |
| Stockport County | Total | | 64 | 3 | 7 | 1 | 1 | 0 | 9 | 0 | 81 | 4 |
| Ross County | 2024–25 | Scottish Premiership | 38 | 4 | 1 | 0 | 4 | 0 | 2 (Note: Appearances in Scottish Premiership play-offs) | 0 | 45 | 4 |
| Ross County | 2025–26 | Scottish Championship | 27 | 3 | 0 | 0 | 2 | 0 | — | | 29 | 3 |
| Ross County | 2026–27 | Scottish League One | 10 | 2 | 0 | 0 | 6 | 0 | 2 (Note: Appearances in Scottish Challenge Cup) | 0 | 18 | 2 |
| Ross County | Total | | 75 | 9 | 1 | 0 | 12 | 0 | 4 | 0 | 92 | 9 |
| Career Total | | | 308 | 28 | 18 | 1 | 13 | 0 | 23 | 0 | 362 | 29 |

== Honours ==
Stockport County

- EFL League Two: 2023–24
