= Lewis Strapp =

Scottish footballer

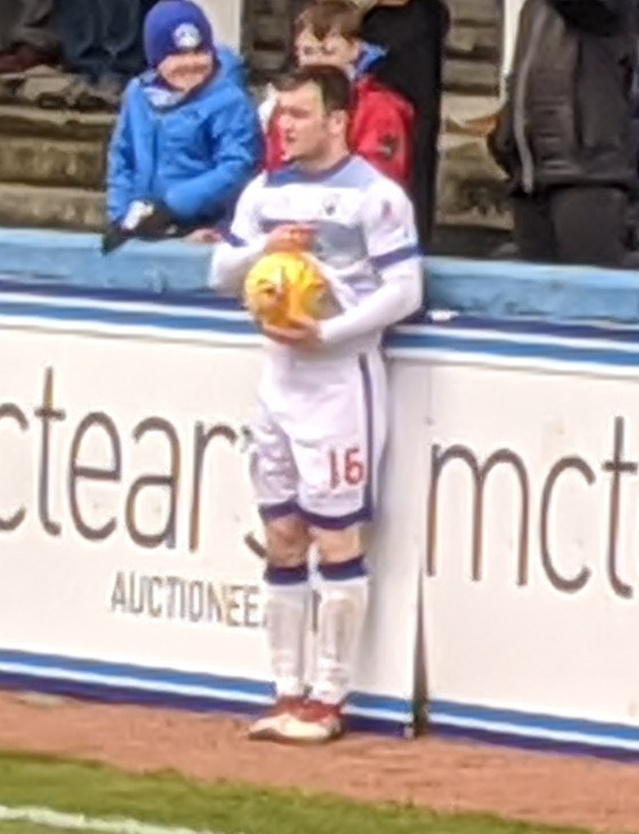
- Strapp about to take a throw-in while playing for Greenock Morton

Personal information
- Full name: Lewis John Strapp
- Date of birth: 26 November 1999 (age 26)
- Place of birth: Dunoon, Scotland
- Position: Defender

Team information
- Current team: Ross County
- Number: 3

Youth career
- 2012–2015: Greenock Morton

Senior career*
Years	Team	Apps	(Gls)
2015–2023	Greenock Morton	104	(2)
2017–2018	→ Elgin City (loan)	13	(1)
2018–2019	→ Annan Athletic (loan)	20	(0)
2023–2024	Greenock Morton	17	(0)
2024	SJK	12	(1)
2024	SJK II	2	(0)
2025–2026	Airdrieonians	43	(2)
2026–	Ross County	9	(1)
- * Club domestic league appearances and goals as of 19 October 2026

Lewis John Strapp (born 26 November 1999) is a Scottish professional footballer who plays as a left-sided defender for Scottish League One club Ross County. He started his career at Greenock Morton and has subsequently had loan spells at Elgin City and Annan Athletic as well as permanent spells at SJK and Airdrieonians.

== Club career ==
Strapp joined the Greenock Morton youth academy on its inception in 2012, before signing professional forms shortly after his 16th birthday.

He made his debut for Morton in a Scottish League Cup tie against Albion Rovers in July 2016. He joined Elgin City on loan in August 2017 until January 2018.

In June 2018, he signed with Morton for another season.

In late September 2018, Strapp and team-mate Ruaridh Langan joined Annan Athletic on a short-term development loan.

Strapp scored his first league goal for Morton with the late winner against Ayr United on Halloween 2020; he also opened the scoring with an own goal in the 32nd minute.

Strapp went on to regularly feature for Morton, making his 100th appearance for the club in a 5–0 home win against Dunfermline Athletic. He also scored his second career goal in a 0–1 away win against Inverness a few weeks later. Following much speculation about a potential move away from Morton, he signed a one-year contract extension, expiring in summer 2023. In April 2023, it was revealed that Strapp would be leaving the club at the end of the season, and due to injury, his last appearance for Morton would be in a 5–0 away defeat to Celtic in the Scottish Cup in January 2023.

However, after months without a club, and having a trial at Kilmarnock, Strapp returned to Greenock Morton on 8 December 2023, signing a short-term deal until the end of January. On 19 January 2024, he signed a contract extension with the Ton until the end of the season.

On 26 June 2024, he moved to Finland and signed with SJK in the country's top-tier Veikkausliiga. The transfer was effective from 2 July 2024. On 19 December, SJK announced that Strapp would leave the club.

In January 2025, he signed with Scottish Championship side Airdrieonians. After suffering relegation with the team Strapp was released from Ardrie in May 2026. Later that month he joined fellow newly-relegated Scottish League One side Ross County.

== Career statistics ==
As of 17 October 2026

Appearances and goals by club, season and competition
Club	Season	League			National cup		League cup		Other		Total	
Club	Season	Division	Apps	Goals	Apps	Goals	Apps	Goals	Apps	Goals	Apps	Goals
Greenock Morton	2016–17	Scottish Championship	2	0	0	0	2	0	1 (Note: Appearances in the Scottish Challenge Cup)	0	5	0
Greenock Morton	2017–18	Scottish Championship	3	0	0	0	2	0	1	0	6	0
Greenock Morton	2018–19	Scottish Championship	0	0	0	0	3	0	0	0	3	0
Greenock Morton	2019–20	Scottish Championship	23	0	3	0	5	1	0	0	31	1
Greenock Morton	2020–21	Scottish Championship	27	1	3	0	3	0	0	0	33	1
Greenock Morton	2021–22	Scottish Championship	29	1	3	0	2	0	3	0	37	1
Greenock Morton	2022–23	Scottish Championship	20	0	2	0	4	0	1	0	27	0
Greenock Morton	Total		104	2	11	0	21	1	6	0	142	3
Elgin City (loan)	2017–18	Scottish League Two	13	1	0	0	0	0	0	0	13	1
Annan Athletic (loan)	2018–19	Scottish League Two	20	0	0	0	0	0	4 (Note: Appearances in the Scottish League One play-offs)	0	24	0
Greenock Morton	2023–24	Scottish Championship	17	0	3	0	0	0	0	0	20	0
SJK	2024	Veikkausliiga	12	1	1	0	0	0	–		13	1
SJK Akatemia	2024	Ykkösliiga	2	0	–		–		–		2	0
Airdrieonians	2024–25	Scottish Championship	13	0	0	0	0	0	4	1	17	1
Airdrieonians	2025–26	Scottish Championship	30	2	3	0	0	0	4	0	37	2
Airdrieonians	Total		43	2	3	0	0	0	8	1	54	3
Ross County	2026–27	Scottish League One	9	1	0	0	6	0	2	0	17	1
Career total			219	7	18	0	27	1	20	1	285	9

== Honours ==
- SPFL Development League West: Winners (2) 2015–16, 2017-18
