= Ross County F.C. =

Scottish football club

Ross County
- Full name: Ross County Football Club
- Nickname: The Staggies
- Founded: 1929; 97 years ago
- Ground: Victoria Park, Dingwall
- Capacity: 6,541
- Coordinates: 57.595834°N 4.419052°W
- Chairman: Roy MacGregor
- CEO: Steven Ferguson
- Manager: Stuart Kettlewell
- League: Scottish League One
- 2025–26: Scottish Championship, 10th of 10 (relegated)
- Website: www.rosscountyfootballclub.co.uk
Home colours	Away colours

Ross County Football Club is a professional football club based in Dingwall, Scotland. The club play in Scottish League One after their relegation from the Scottish Championship in the 2025–26 season.

Prior to the 1994–95 season Ross County played in the Highland Football League, a competition they won three times. They have also won the Scottish First Division, Scottish Championship, Second Division, Third Division (once each) and the Challenge Cup on three occasions. In 2010, they reached the Scottish Cup Final, and in 2016 they won the Scottish League Cup. The club's nickname is The Staggies, and its colours are dark blue, red and white.

== History ==
=== Formation and early years ===
The club was formed in 1929 in what was then Ross and Cromarty after the previous local club from the North of Scotland Junior League Dingwall Victoria United (the 'Dingwall Vics') successfully applied for Highland Football League membership. The club was subsequently renamed Ross County. Playing in the Highland League from 1929, they won the championship on three occasions, first in 1967, then in 1991 and 1992. They also gained a reputation for their good performances in the early rounds of the Scottish Cup, upsetting league teams on eight occasions. The most notable of these upsets came on 8 January 1994, when they won 4–0 at Forfar Athletic, and were elected to the Scottish Football League three days later.

=== Entry to the Scottish Football League ===
Chart of table positions of Ross County since joining the League.

At the beginning of season 1994–95 the Scottish Football League was restructured into four tiers, and, following a vote on 11 January 1994, County were allocated one of the two vacancies in the new 10-club Division Three. County gathered 57 votes. They were joined by a new club created as a result of a merger of two teams to form Inverness Caledonian Thistle, who amassed 68 votes.

In 1998–99, Ross County were crowned Champions of the Third Division and thereby won promotion to the Second Division, where they finished in third place. This resulted in promotion to the First Division thanks to a reorganisation of the League, with the Premier League being expanded from ten clubs to twelve. After seven seasons in the First Division Ross County were relegated back to the Second Division in 2006–07. They won the Second Division in 2007–08, and were promoted back to the First Division. Ross County finished their first season back in the First Division in 8th place.

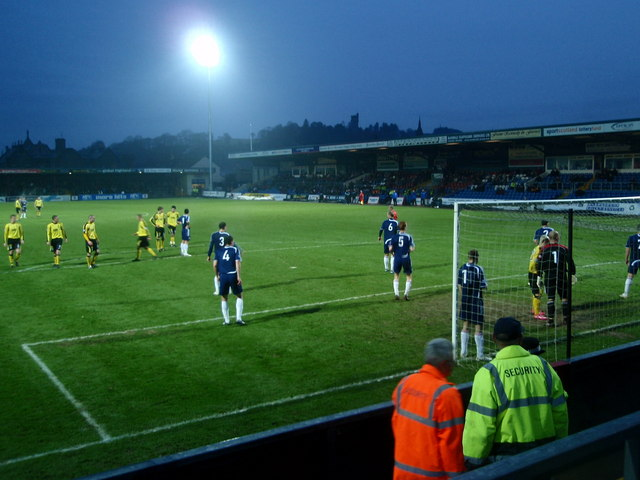
Ross County contesting a home match against Livingston

Their manager for a very short spell until October 2005, was former Inverness and Hearts manager John Robertson. He left the club on 24 October 2005, due to differences of opinion on a number of fundamental issues with the chairman. Gardner Spiers, a former Aberdeen coach, was appointed caretaker manager, but he too left in April 2006 after being told he would not be considered for appointment on a permanent basis. Director of Football George Adams took temporary charge before former Motherwell player Scott Leitch was appointed on 18 April 2006. Ross County won their first ever nationwide trophy when they won the Scottish Challenge Cup in November 2006 on penalties with Jason Crooks scoring the deciding spot kick on his competitive debut.

Leitch, after winning the Challenge Cup but suffering relegation, stood down at the end of the 2006–07 season, almost exactly one year after his appointment. Former Partick Thistle manager Dick Campbell was announced as his replacement in May 2007. However, after a good run of results to start their Division 2 campaign, Campbell and the Ross County board decided to part company on 2 October 2007. Derek Adams (son of George Adams) took over as caretaker, and was confirmed as permanent manager a month later after the side's good form continued. County again reached the final of the Scottish Challenge Cup in 2008. They played Airdrie United at McDiarmid Park. Unlike two years previously, County lost in a penalty shootout where four penalties were missed. Ross County also reached the Challenge Cup final in April 2011 in which they defeated Queen of the South 2–0.

In November 2010 Derek Adams left to become Colin Calderwood's assistant at Hibernian. Former Celtic player Willie McStay was appointed as his replacement in November 2010. McStay's tenure was short – lasting only 9 games. Jimmy Calderwood was then appointed until the end of the 2010–11 season. In May 2011, it was announced that Derek Adams was to return as manager.

On 23 March 2010, they defeated Scottish Premier League club Hibernian 2–1 in a Scottish Cup quarter-final replay at home at Victoria Park. In the semi-final, they played Celtic on Saturday 10 April 2010. In one of the biggest upsets in cup history, Ross County won 2–0 at Hampden Park and reached the final of the Scottish Cup for the first time in their history. More than 7,000 Ross County fans travelled to Glasgow to watch the game.

In the 2010 Scottish Cup Final on 15 May 2010, County lost 0–3 to Dundee United at Hampden Park. The match was watched by more than 17,000 Ross County fans.

=== Rise to the top flight ===
Ross County secured promotion to the Scottish Premier League for the first time on 10 April 2012 when their nearest rival to the title Dundee failed to beat Queen of the South. During this push to promotion, Ross County embarked on a 40-game undefeated run in league football, which continued into the Scottish Premier League. The run was ended by St Johnstone on 22 September 2012. The Staggies parted company with George and Derek Adams on 28 August 2014 following a poor start to the 2014–15 campaign. Jim McIntyre was appointed manager on 9 September 2014, with Billy Dodds as his assistant.

=== League Cup victory ===
On 13 March 2016, Ross County won their first ever major trophy when they beat Hibernian 2–1 in the final of the 2015–16 Scottish League Cup. The team's fortunes declined after this success, and they were relegated at the end of the 2017–18 season.

The club secured an immediate return to the Scottish Premiership after a 4–0 win at home to Queen of the South on 26 April 2019 saw them lift the 2018–19 Scottish Championship.

=== Back to back relegations ===
Following three consecutive 11th place finished in the Scottish Premiership in 2022–23, 2023–24 and 2024–25, Ross County were relegated back to the Scottish Championship in May 2025, after losing the play off final to Livingston 5–3 on aggregate.

Following relegation, manager Don Cowie remained as Ross County manager, as the club performed a large squad overhaul in the 2025 summer window. Following a poor start to the Scottish Championship season with County sitting bottom of the table, Cowie departed County by mutual consent.

In September 2025 Ross County announced former Dundee manager Tony Docherty as the club’s new manager. However in December, following a 6–0 away defeat to Raith Rovers, Docherty was sacked, with County still sitting 10th in the Scottish Championship table.

Later in December 2025, Ross County announced the return of former manager Stuart Kettlewell, as manager on a deal until the end of the season.

In April 2026, Ross County’s relegation to Scottish League One was confirmed after a 3–2 away defeat to Raith Rovers. This result meant the club had suffered back to back relegations from the Scottish Premiership to the third tier, League One, despite being the bookmakers pre-season favourites to win the Scottish Championship. With County becoming the first team to suffer consecutive relegations from the Premiership to League One in the SPFL era.

Following this second successive relegation, County announced that manager Stuart Kettlewell would remain in post and lead the club into the League One season.

== Nickname ==
The club's nickname is the Staggies, taken from their badge which is a Caberfeidh, or Stag's Head. This in turn was taken from the regimental badge of the Seaforth Highlanders, the regiment in which many locals had fought and died during the Great War. The club's mascot, a stag named Rosco, is a play on the club's nickname.

== Highland Derby ==
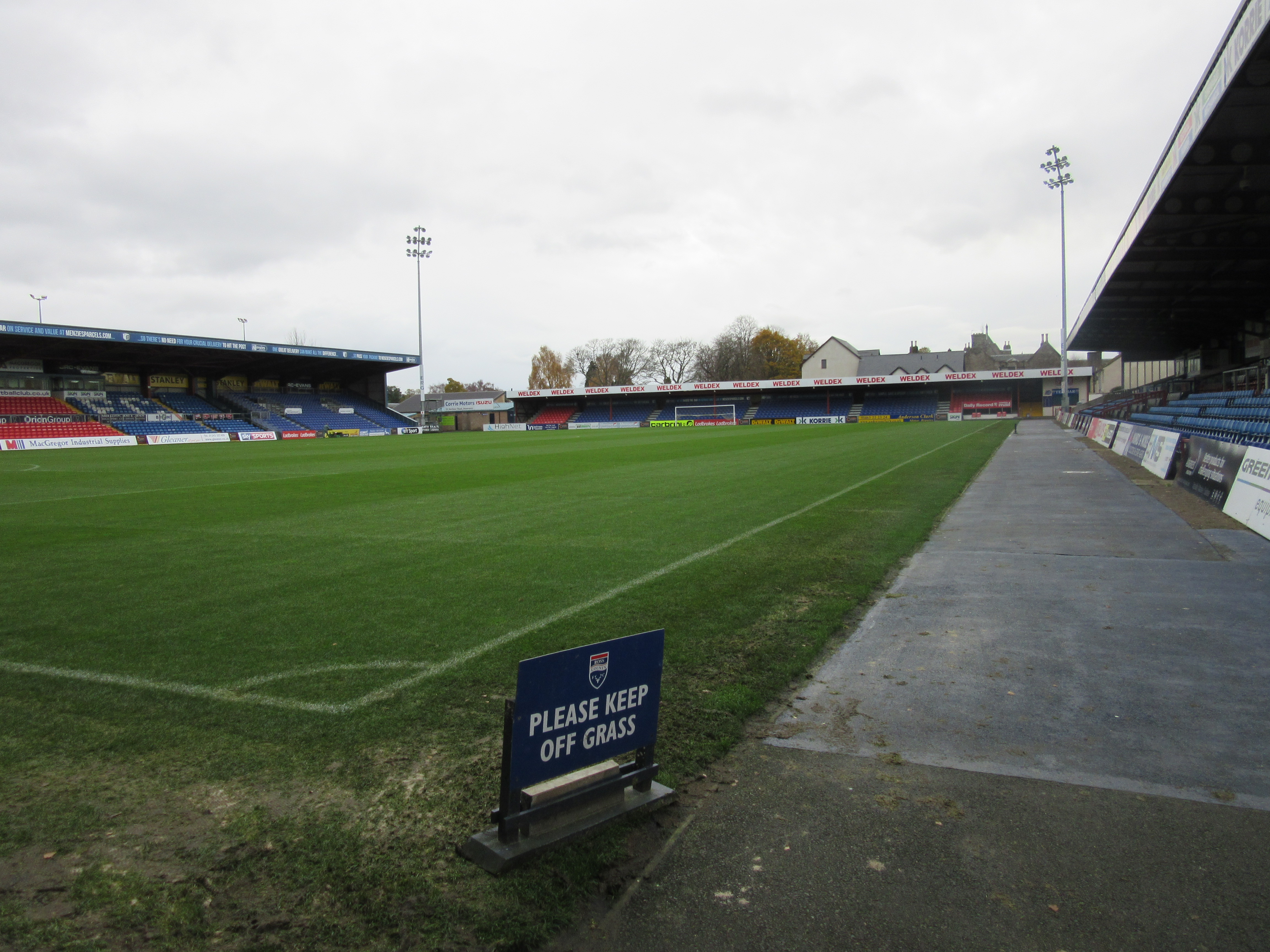
Victoria Park, Dingwall

Ross County's main rivals are fellow Highlanders, Inverness Caledonian Thistle, with whom they contest the Highland derby. This, unlike many rivalries, is generally friendly as both sets of fans live and work together given their close geographic locations. Due to the geographical proximity of the clubs and despite the rivalry, Inverness have signed many former Ross County players over the years, including Billy Mckay, Barry Wilson, Stuart Golabek, Roy McBain, Graham Bayne, Richard Hastings, John Rankin, Andrew Barrowman, Lionel Djebi-Zadi and Don Cowie.

Many former Inverness CT players have also "crossed the bridge" in the opposite direction, including Grant Munro, Michael Fraser, Ross Tokely and Coll Donaldson in recent years. Both Stuart Golabek and Andy Barrowman had two spells at County each, with the former also having two spells at Inverness. A notable player is Iain Vigurs, who crossed the bridge more than twice, having spent two spells with both County and Inverness.

== Stadium ==
The club's home ground, Victoria Park, has a greater capacity than the population of Dingwall, which was 5,491 at the 2011 census. However the County of Ross and Cromarty, from which the club draws much of its support, has a population of over 60,000. The largest crowd ever to watch a match at Victoria Park was reported as 8,000, for the Scottish Cup match between Ross County and Rangers in February 1966. The revenue from this match helped to fund construction of the Jail End terrace.

== Kit history ==
Period	Manufacturer	Sponsor
1929–1977	Unknown	None
1977–1982	(England) Admiral	None
1982–1984	(England) Litesome	None
1984–1985	(England) Litesome	(Scotland) MacLean Sports
1985–1987	(England) Umbro	(Scotland) MacLean Sports
1987–1990	(England) Umbro	(Scotland) Ken's Garage
1990–1991	(England) Admiral	(Scotland) Ken's Garage
1991–1992	(England) Admiral	(Scotland) MacGregor Industrial Supplies
1992–1993	(Scotland) RCFC Collection	(Scotland) The Boutique
1993–1994	Activity	(Scotland) MacGregor Industrial Supplies
1994–1996	Activity	(Scotland) MacGregor Group
1996–1998	(Scotland) Victoria Collection	(Scotland) MacLean electrical
1998–2000	(England) Avec	(Scotland) MacLean electrical
2000–2004	(United States) Xara	(Scotland) Aberdeen Asset Management
2004–2007	(United States) Xara	(Scotland) MacLean electrical
2007–2008	(England) Crest Teamwear	(Scotland) Roxburgh
2008–2010	(Germany) Adidas	(Scotland) Highnet
2010–2012	(United States) Nike	(Scotland) Highnet
2012–2014	(Italy) Diadora	(United States) CRC-Evans
2014–2016	(England) Carbrini	(United States) CRC-Evans
2016–2018	(Italy) Macron	(United States) CRC-Evans
2018–2020	(Italy) Macron	(Scotland) McEwan Fraser Legal
2020–2021	(Italy) Macron	(Scotland) Ross-Shire Engineering
2021–present	(Spain) Joma	(Scotland) Ross-Shire Engineering

== Players ==
=== Current squad ===
As of 1 October 2026

Note: Flags indicate national team as defined under FIFA eligibility rules; some limited exceptions apply. Players may hold more than one non-FIFA nationality.

No.	Pos.	Nation	Player
1	GK	ENG	Brad Foster
2	DF	SCO	Adam Forrester (on loan from Hearts)
3	DF	SCO	Lewis Strapp
4	DF	ENG	Akil Wright
5	DF	SCO	Lewis Reid
6	MF	ENG	Connor Randall
7	MF	MAS	Richard Chin
8	MF	SCO	Dean Cornelius
9	FW	SCO	Brian Graham (captain)
10	MF	SCO	Jamie Lindsay
11	FW	ENG	Kieran Phillips
15	DF	SCO	Dylan Smith

No.	Pos.	Nation	Player
16	MF	SCO	Chris Hamilton
17	FW	SCO	Ricco Diack (on loan from Partick Thistle)
18	MF	SCO	Andrew Macleod
19	MF	SCO	Luke McCarvel
20	MF	ENG	Jack Turner
22	FW	SCO	Adam Emslie
23	MF	SCO	Ross Docherty
24	FW	SCO	Lewis Jamieson
28	MF	SCO	Jamie Williamson
30	GK	AUS	Nicholas Suman (on loan from Aberdeen)
43	DF	SCO	Josh Reid

=== On loan ===
Note: Flags indicate national team as defined under FIFA eligibility rules; some limited exceptions apply. Players may hold more than one non-FIFA nationality.

No.	Pos.	Nation	Player
—	GK	SCO	Alexander Brown (on loan at Alness United)
—	GK	SCO	Jayden Reid (on loan at Invergordon)
—	DF	SCO	Ruaridh Campbell (on loan at Alness United)
—	DF	SCO	Oliver Lamont (co-operation loan with Invergordon)
—	DF	SCO	Eoin Munro (on loan at Rothes)
—	MF	SCO	Greg Ferguson (on loan at Forres Mechanics)
—	MF	SCO	Rio Hastings (on loan at Rothes)

No.	Pos.	Nation	Player
—	MF	SCO	Lewis Mackay (co-operation loan with Elgin City)
—	MF	SCO	Aaron MacLellan (on loan at Fort William)
—	MF	SCO	Copeland Thain (co-operation loan with Invergordon)
—	FW	SCO	Calum Brown (co-operation loan with Elgin City)
—	FW	SCO	Joe Coyle (co-operation loan with Invergordon)
—	FW	SCO	Torran Lambie (on loan at Invergordon)
—	FW	SCO	Sam MacLennan (on loan at Alness United)

== Club staff ==
=== Coaching staff ===
Position	Name
Manager	Stuart Kettlewell
Assistant manager	Stephen Frail
First team coach	Gordon Duff
Goalkeeping coach	Stuart Garden
Head of professional phase	Don Cowie
Academy manager	Campbell Money
Head of data strategy and recruitment	Donnie Forbes
Match analyst	Max Campbell
Head of performance	Jason Moriarty

== Managerial history ==
Dates	Name
1929–1930	(Scotland) Tom Pirie
1985–1987	(Scotland) John Buchanan
1987–1996	(Scotland) Robert Wilson
1 July 1996 – 11 November 2002	(Scotland) Neale Cooper
27 November 2002 – 11 June 2005	(Scotland) Alex Smith
21 June 2005 – 24 October 2005	(Scotland) John Robertson
24 October 2005 – 3 June 2006	(Scotland) Gardner Speirs (caretaker)
1 July 2006 – 30 April 2007	(Scotland) Scott Leitch
17 May 2007 – 2 October 2007	(Scotland) Dick Campbell
4 October 2007 – 11 November 2010; 19 May 2011 – 28 August 2014; 20 November 2023 – 7 February 2024	(Scotland) Derek Adams
11 November 2010 – 25 November 2010	(Scotland) Craig Brewster (caretaker)
25 November 2010 – 12 February 2011	(Scotland) Willie McStay
12 February 2011 – 17 February 2011	(Scotland) George Adams (caretaker)
17 February 2011 – 15 May 2011	(Scotland) Jimmy Calderwood
28 August 2014 – 9 September 2014	(Scotland) Steven Ferguson (caretaker)
9 September 2014 – 25 September 2017	(Scotland) Jim McIntyre
28 September 2017 – 1 March 2018	(Republic of Ireland) Owen Coyle
2 March 2018 – 10 June 2020	(Scotland) Steven Ferguson (Scotland) Stuart Kettlewell
10 June 2020 – 19 December 2020; 30 December 2025 – present	(Scotland) Stuart Kettlewell
21 December 2020 – 24 May 2021	(Scotland) John Hughes
26 May 2021 – 15 November 2023	(Scotland) Malky Mackay
8 February 2024 – 24 August 2025	(Scotland) Don Cowie
2 September 2025 – 14 December 2025	(Scotland) Tony Docherty

== Club records ==
- First league goal scored: William D Herd 1994 v Cowdenbeath
- Record all-time attendance: 8,000 approx v Rangers (Scottish Cup, 28 February 1966)
- Record league attendance: 6,590 v Celtic (Scottish Premiership, 18 November 2017)
- Record win: 14–0 v Heart of Midlothian B (Scottish Challenge Cup, 26 September 2026)
- Record defeat: 0–7 v Kilmarnock (1961–62 Scottish Cup third round)
- Club record signing: £100,000 – Ross Draper from Inverness Caledonian Thistle, 9 August 2017
- Club record sale: Undisclosed (>£300,000) – Liam Boyce to Burton Albion, 20 June 2017

== Honours ==
=== League ===
- First Division / Championship (second tier)
  - Winners (2): 2011–12, 2018–19
- Second Division (third tier)
  - Winners (1): 2007–08
- Third Division (fourth tier)
  - Winners (1): 1998–99
- Highland Football League
  - Winners (3): 1966–67, 1990–91, 1991–92
- North Caledonian Football League
  - Winners (2): 1965–66, 1996–97 (Reserves)

=== Cup ===
- Scottish League Cup:
  - Winners (1): 2015–16
- Scottish Cup:
  - Runners-up (1): 2009–10
- Challenge Cup
  - Winners (3): 2006–07, 2010–11, 2018–19
  - Runners-up (2): 2004–05, 2008–09
- Qualifying Cup (North)
  - Winners (2): 1973–74, 1993–94
  - Runners-up (4): 1933–34, 1965–66, 1969–70, 1972–73
- North of Scotland Cup
  - Winners (6): 1929–30, 1969–70, 1971–72, 1991–92, 2006–07, 2018–19
- Highland League Cup
  - Winners (4): 1949–50, 1968–69, 1978–79, 1991–92

=== Youth ===
- SPFL Development League (Under-20)
  - Winners (1): 2016–17

== Sources ==
- Inglis, Simon (1996). Football Grounds of Britain. Collins Willow. ISBN 0-00-218426-5.
