= 2020 St Patrick's Athletic F.C. season =

St Patrick's Athletic F.C.
2020 season
- Chairman: Garrett Kelleher
- Coach: Stephen O'Donnell
- Stadium: Richmond Park, Inchicore, Dublin 8
- League of Ireland: 6th
- FAI Cup: First Round (knocked out by Finn Harps)
- EA Sports Cup: Second Round (Competition Deferred)
- Leinster Senior Cup: Fourth Round (Competition Abandoned)
- Top goalscorer: League: Georgie Kelly – 3 goals All: Georgie Kelly – 3 goals
- Highest home attendance: 2,807 vs Waterford (14 February)
- Lowest home attendance: 2,078 vs Cork City (6 March)
Home colours	Away colours	Third colours

The 2020 season was St Patrick's Athletic F.C.'s 91st year in existence and was the Supersaint's 69th consecutive season in the top-flight of Irish football. It was the first full season with Stephen O'Donnell as manager, having taken over from Harry Kenny on 31 August 2019. The season was hit by the Coronavirus pandemic after just 4 league games, which resulted in the league being halted from March to July as well as being halved from 36 games to just 18, the League of Ireland Cup and the Leinster Senior Cup were also abandoned in earlier rounds than Pat's had entered into. The season finished with Pat's in 6th place, while they were knocked out of the FAI Cup by Finn Harps in the first round.

== Squad ==
No.	Name	Position(s)	Nationality	Hometown	Date of birth (age)	Previous club	Year signed	Club apps.	Club goals
Goalkeepers
1	Brian Maher	GK	(Republic of Ireland)	Raheny, Dublin	1 November 2000 (age 25)	(Republic of Ireland) St Patrick's Athletic Under 17's	2018	5	0
1	Josh Keeley	GK	(Republic of Ireland)	Dunboyne, Meath	17 May 2003 (age 23)	(Republic of Ireland) St Patrick's Athletic Under 19's	2020	0	0
25	Conor Kearns	GK	(Republic of Ireland)	Templeogue, Dublin	6 May 1998 (age 28)	(Republic of Ireland) UCD	2020	1	0
26	Brendan Clarke	GK	(Republic of Ireland)	Inchicore, Dublin	17 September 1985 (age 41)	(Republic of Ireland) Limerick	2018	279	1
Defenders
2	Rory Feely	RB/CB	(Republic of Ireland)	Tramore, Waterford	3 January 1997 (age 29)	(Republic of Ireland) Waterford	2020	60	3
3	Ian Bermingham (Captain)	LB	(Republic of Ireland)	Ballyfermot, Dublin	16 June 1989 (age 37)	(Republic of Ireland) Shamrock Rovers	2010	408	15
5	Lee Desmond	CB/CDM/LB	(Republic of Ireland)	Donaghmede, Dublin	22 January 1995 (age 31)	(Republic of Ireland) Shelbourne	2015	193	1
12	Ollie Younger	CB	(England)	Skipton, Yorkshire	14 November 1999 (age 26)	(England) Burnley (loan)	2020	2	0
14	Luke McNally	CB	(Republic of Ireland)	Enfield, Meath	20 September 1999 (age 27)	(Republic of Ireland) St Patrick's Athletic Under 19's	2019	19	1
17	Simon Madden	RB	(Republic of Ireland)	Tallaght, Dublin	1 May 1988 (age 38)	(Republic of Ireland) Shamrock Rovers	2018	73	3
20	Shane Griffin	LB/LW	(Republic of Ireland)	Carrigaline, Cork	8 September 1994 (age 32)	(Republic of Ireland) Cork City	2020	14	0
24	David Titov	RB	(Latvia)	London, England	5 January 2000 (age 26)	(England) Brentford B	2020	5	0
30	Paul Cleary	RB/LB/CB	(Republic of Ireland)	Lucan, Dublin	9 February 1999 (age 27)	(Republic of Ireland) Drogheda United	2018	5	1
Midfielders
4	Dan Ward	CM	(England)	South Shields, Durham	30 September 1997 (age 29)	(England) Spennymoor Town	2020	7	0
6	Jamie Lennon	CDM/CM	(Republic of Ireland)	Santry, Dublin	9 May 1998 (age 28)	(Republic of Ireland) St Patrick's Athletic Under 19's	2017	86	1
7	Robbie Benson	CM	(Republic of Ireland)	Athlone, Westmeath	7 May 1992 (age 34)	(Republic of Ireland) Dundalk	2020	17	2
8	Darragh Markey	CAM	(Republic of Ireland)	Lucan, Dublin	23 May 1997 (age 29)	(Republic of Ireland) St Patrick's Athletic Under 19's	2015	116	4
11	Dean Clarke	RW/LW/ST/RB	(Republic of Ireland)	Dundrum, Dublin	29 March 1993 (age 33)	(Republic of Ireland) Limerick	2018	66	7
15	Billy King	RW/LW	(Scotland)	Portobello, Edinburgh	12 May 1994 (age 32)	(Scotland) Greenock Morton	2020	14	1
16	Jason McClelland	RW/LW/CAM	(Republic of Ireland)	Templeogue, Dublin	5 March 1997 (age 29)	(Republic of Ireland) UCD	2020	16	0
19	Chris Forrester	CAM/LW/CDM	(Republic of Ireland)	Smithfield, Dublin	17 December 1992 (age 33)	(Scotland) Aberdeen	2019	210	47
22	James Doona	RW/LW	(Republic of Ireland)	Inchicore, Dublin	15 January 1998 (age 28)	(Republic of Ireland) Shamrock Rovers	2018	47	5
23	Jordan Gibson	RW/LW/ST	(England)	Birmingham, West Midlands	26 February 1998 (age 28)	(England) Bradford City	2020	15	2
34	Ben McCormack	LW/RW	(Republic of Ireland)	Harmonstown, Dublin	4 April 2003 (age 23)	(Republic of Ireland) St Patrick's Athletic Under 17's	2019	3	0
35	Darragh Burns	RW	(Republic of Ireland)	Stamullen, Meath	8 June 2002 (age 24)	(Republic of Ireland) St Patrick's Athletic Under 19's	2019	8	0
Forwards
9	Martin Rennie	ST	(Scotland)	Kirkcaldy, Fife	9 May 1994 (age 32)	(Scotland) Montrose	2020	11	0
10	Ronan Hale	ST/LW	(Northern Ireland)	Belfast, Antrim	8 September 1998 (age 28)	(Northern Ireland) Crusaders	2019	12	2
12	Georgie Kelly	ST	(Republic of Ireland)	Tooban, Donegal	12 November 1996 (age 29)	(Republic of Ireland) Dundalk	2020	13	3
18	Jake Walker	ST	(Republic of Ireland)	Clondalkin, Dublin	19 August 2000 (age 26)	(Republic of Ireland) St Patrick's Athletic Under 19's	2017	30	3

=== Transfers ===
==== Pre-season ====
===== In =====
Player	Country	Position	Signed from
Jason McClelland	(Republic of Ireland)	Midfielder	(Republic of Ireland) UCD
Robbie Benson	(Republic of Ireland)	Midfielder	(Republic of Ireland) Dundalk
Rory Feely	(Republic of Ireland)	Defender	(Republic of Ireland) Waterford
Conor Kearns	(Republic of Ireland)	Goalkeeper	(Republic of Ireland) UCD
Shane Griffin	(Republic of Ireland)	Defender	(Republic of Ireland) Cork City
Billy King	(Scotland)	Midfielder	(Scotland) Greenock Morton
Dan Ward	(England)	Midfielder	(England) Spennymoor Town
Martin Rennie	(Scotland)	Forward	(Scotland) Montrose
Ollie Younger	(England)	Defender	(England) Burnley (loan)

===== Out =====
Player	Country	Position	Sold to
Cian Coleman	(Republic of Ireland)	Midfielder	(Republic of Ireland) Cork City
Mikey Drennan	(Republic of Ireland)	Forward	(Republic of Ireland) Evergreen
Glen McAuley	(Republic of Ireland)	Forward	(Republic of Ireland) Bohemians
Gary Shaw	(Republic of Ireland)	Forward	(Republic of Ireland) Bray Wanderers
Conor Clifford	(Republic of Ireland)	Midfielder	(Republic of Ireland) Derry City
Rhys McCabe	(Scotland)	Midfielder	(Scotland) Brechin City
Kevin Toner	(Republic of Ireland)	Defender	(Republic of Ireland) Kilmore Celtic
David Webster	(Republic of Ireland)	Defender	(Republic of Ireland) Finn Harps
Barry Murphy	(Republic of Ireland)	Goalkeeper	Retired
Ciaran Kelly	(Republic of Ireland)	Defender	(Republic of Ireland) Bohemians
Brian Maher	(Republic of Ireland)	Goalkeeper	(Republic of Ireland) Bray Wanderers (loan)
Paul Cleary	(Republic of Ireland)	Defender	(Republic of Ireland) Wexford (loan)

==== Mid-season ====
===== In =====
Player	Country	Position	Signed from
Paul Cleary	(Republic of Ireland)	Defender	(Republic of Ireland) Wexford (Returning of loan)
Georgie Kelly	(Republic of Ireland)	Forward	(Republic of Ireland) Dundalk (loan)
Jordan Gibson	(England)	Midfielder	(England) Bradford City
David Titov	(Latvia)	Defender	(England) Brentford B

===== Out =====
Player	Country	Position	Sold to
Ollie Younger	(England)	Defender	(England) Burnley (End of loan)
Brian Maher	(Republic of Ireland)	Goalkeeper	(Republic of Ireland) Bray Wanderers
Dean Clarke	(Republic of Ireland)	Midfielder	Released
Jake Walker	(Republic of Ireland)	Forward	(Republic of Ireland) Cherry Orchard
Ronan Hale	(Northern Ireland)	Forward	(Northern Ireland) Larne
Dan Ward	(England)	Midfielder	(England) Gateshead
Martin Rennie	(Scotland)	Forward	(Scotland) Montrose

=== Squad statistics ===
==== Appearances, goals and cards ====
Number in brackets represents (appearances of which were substituted ON). Last updated – 10 November 2020

No.	Player	SSE Airtricity League		FAI Cup		EA Sports Cup		Leinster Senior Cup		Total	
No.	Player	Apps	Goals	Apps	Goals	Apps	Goals	Apps	Goals	Apps	Goals
1	Josh Keeley	0	0	0	0	—		—		0	0
2	Rory Feely	17	1	1	0	—		—		18	1
3	Ian Bermingham	11(3)	0	1	0	—		—		12(3)	0
5	Lee Desmond	18(1)	0	0	0	—		—		18(1)	0
6	Jamie Lennon	16(2)	0	1	0	—		—		17(2)	0
7	Robbie Benson	16	2	1(1)	0	—		—		17(1)	2
8	Darragh Markey	10(8)	0	1	0	—		—		11(8)	0
12	Georgie Kelly	12	3	1(1)	0	—		—		13(1)	3
14	Luke McNally	18	1	1	0	—		—		19	1
15	Billy King	14(4)	1	0	0	—		—		14(4)	1
16	Jason McClelland	15(8)	0	1	0	—		—		16(8)	0
17	Simon Madden	0	0	0	0	—		—		0	0
19	Chris Forrester	17(2)	2	1(1)	0	—		—		18(2)	2
20	Shane Griffin	14	0	0	0	—		—		14	0
22	James Doona	7(6)	0	1(1)	0	—		—		8(7)	0
23	Jordan Gibson	14(2)	2	1	0	—		—		15(2)	2
24	David Titov	4	0	1	0	—		—		5	0
25	Conor Kearns	0	0	1	0	—		—		1	0
26	Brendan Clarke	18	0	0	0	—		—		18	0
30	Paul Cleary	0	0	0	0	—		—		0	0
34	Ben McCormack	2(2)	0	0	0	—		—		2(2)	0
35	Darragh Burns	6(6)	0	0	0	—		—		6(6)	0
Players that left during the season
1	Brian Maher	0	0	0	0	—		—		0	0
4	Dan Ward	6(2)	0	1	0	—		—		7(2)	0
9	Martin Rennie	10(8)	0	1	0	—		—		11(8)	0
10	Ronan Hale	3(1)	1	0	0	—		—		3(1)	1
11	Dean Clarke	4(1)	0	0	0	—		—		4(1)	0
12	Ollie Younger	2	0	0	0	—		—		2	0
18	Jake Walker	1(1)	0	0	0	—		—		1(1)	0

==== Top scorers ====
Includes all competitive matches. Last updated 10 November 2020

Number	Name	SSE Airtricity League	FAI Cup	EA Sports Cup	Leinster Senior Cup	Total
12	Georgie Kelly	3	0	—	—	3
23	Jordan Gibson	2	0	—	—	2
7	Robbie Benson	2	0	—	—	2
19	Chris Forrester	2	0	—	—	2
14	Luke McNally	1	0	—	—	1
2	Rory Feely	1	0	—	—	1
15	Billy King	1	0	—	—	1
10	Ronan Hale	1	0	—	—	1
N/A	Own goal	1	0	—	—	1

==== Top assists ====
Includes all competitive matches. Last updated 10 November 2020

Number	Name	SSE Airtricity League	FAI Cup	EA Sports Cup	Leinster Senior Cup	Total
7	Robbie Benson	5	0	—	—	5
20	Shane Griffin	3	0	—	—	3
5	Lee Desmond	2	0	—	—	2
16	Jason McClelland	1	0	—	—	1

==== Top clean sheets ====
Includes all competitive matches. Last updated 10 November 2020

Position	Number	Name	SSE Airtricity League	FAI Cup	EA Sports Cup	Leinster Senior Cup	Total
GK	1	Brian Maher	0/0	0/0	—	—	0/0
GK	1	Josh Keeley	0/0	0/0	—	—	0/0
GK	25	Conor Kearns	0/0	0/1	—	—	0/1
GK	26	Brendan Clarke	8/18	0/0	—	—	8/18

==== Disciplinary record ====
Last updated 10 November 2020

Number	Name	SSE Airtricity League		FAI Cup		EA Sports Cup		Leinster Senior Cup		Total	
Number	Name	Booked	Sent off (straight red)	Booked	Sent off (straight red)	Booked	Sent off (straight red)	Booked	Sent off (straight red)	Booked	Sent off (straight red)
2	Rory Feely	7	1	0	0	—		—		7	1
6	Jamie Lennon	8	0	0	0	—		—		8	0
20	Shane Griffin	6	1	0	0	—		—		6	1
19	Chris Forrester	6	0	0	0	—		—		6	0
12	Georgie Kelly	4	0	0	0	—		—		4	0
12	Ollie Younger	2	1	0	0	—		—		2	1
8	Darragh Markey	2	0	1	0	—		—		3	0
24	David Titov	2	0	1	0	—		—		3	0
23	Jordan Gibson	2	0	0	0	—		—		2	0
14	Luke McNally	2	0	0	0	—		—		2	0
7	Robbie Benson	2	0	0	0	—		—		2	0
5	Lee Desmond	2	0	0	0	—		—		2	0
9	Martin Rennie	1	0	0	0	—		—		1	0
4	Dan Ward	1	0	0	0	—		—		1	0
11	Dean Clarke	1	0	0	0	—		—		1	0
10	Ronan Hale	1	0	0	0	—		—		1	0
Totals		49	3	2	0	—		—		51	3

==== Captains ====
No.	P	Name	Country	No. games	Notes
7	MF	Robbie Benson	(Republic of Ireland)	9	Vice Captain
3	DF	Ian Bermingham	(Republic of Ireland)	8	Captain
19	MF	Chris Forrester	(Republic of Ireland)	2	

Last updated: 10 November 2020
Source: Competitive match reports.
Competitive matches only
Matches started as captain only
Country: FIFA nationality; No.: Squad number; P: Position; Name: Player name; No. Games: Number of games started as captain.

== Club ==
=== Coaching staff ===
- Head coach: Stephen O'Donnell
- Assistant manager: Pat Cregg
- First-team coach: Alan Mathews
- Director of Football: Ger O'Brien
- Coach: Seán O'Connor
- Opposition Analyst: Martin Doyle
- Goalkeeping coach: Pat Jennings
- Strength and Conditioning Coach: Chris Coburn
- Physio: Mark Kenneally
- Physio: Lee Van Haeften
- Physio: Christy O'Neill
- Club Doctor: Dr Matt Corcoran
- Equipment Manager: David McGill
- Under 19s Manager: Jamie Moore
- Under 19s Coach: Sean Doody
- Under 17s Manager: Darragh O'Reilly
- Under 17s Assistant Manager: Sean Gahan
- Under 15s Manager: Seán O'Connor
- Under 15s Coach: Ian Bermingham
- Under 13s Manager: Mark Connolly
- Under 13s Coach: Brendan Clarke
- Under 19s/17s Goalkeeping Coach: Stephen O'Reilly

=== Kit ===
Supplier: Umbro
Sponsor(s): MIG Insurance Brokers (Front of Jersey)
Manguard Plus (Back of Jersey - Top)
Bill Griffin Motors (Back of Jersey - Bottom)
Greenisle Hotel (Sleeves of Jersey)

Home	Away	Third	Pre-season Home	Pre-season Away

The club released new Home & Away kits for the season, with the 2019 season's away kit being used as the Third kit for the season.

Type	Shirt	Shorts	Socks	Info
Home	Red/White Shoulders	White	Red	Worn 16 times; against Waterford (LOI) (H), Cork City (LOI) (H), Longford Town (FRN) (H), Drogheda United (FRN) (A), Derry City (LOI) (H), Finn Harps (LOI) (H), Finn Harps (FAI) (A), Shamrock Rovers (LOI) (H), Waterford (LOI) (A), Sligo Rovers (LOI) (H), Shelbourne (LOI) (H), Cork City (LOI) (A), Finn Harps (LOI) (A), Dundalk (LOI) (H), Shamrock Rovers (LOI) (A), Bohemians (LOI) (H)
Away	Black/Grey Stripes	Black	Black	Worn 4 times; against Sligo Rovers (LOI) (A), Shelbourne (LOI) (A), Dundalk (LOI) (A), Derry City (LOI) (A)
Third	White	Red	White	Worn 3 times; against Galway United (FRN) (N), UCD (FRN) (A), Bohemians (LOI) (A)
Pre-season Home	Red/White Sleeves	White	Red	Worn 4 times; against Fermoy (FRN) (N), Wexford (FRN) (N), Athlone Town (FRN) (A), Drogheda United (FRN) (H)
Pre-season Away	Blue	Blue	Blue	Worn 1 time; against Cobh Ramblers (FRN) (N)

Key:
LOI=League of Ireland Premier Division
FAI=FAI Cup
EAC=EA Sports Cup
LSC=Leinster Senior Cup
FRN=Friendly

== Competitions ==
=== League of Ireland ===
==== League table ====
Pos	Team	Pld	W	D	L	GF	GA	GD	Pts	Qualification or relegation
1	Shamrock Rovers (C)	18	15	3	0	44	7	+37	48	Qualification for Champions League first qualifying round
2	Bohemians	18	12	1	5	23	12	+11	37	Qualification for Europa Conference League first qualifying round (Note: Since the winners of the 2020 FAI Cup (Dundalk) qualified for European competition based on their league position, the final spot awarded to the Cup winner passed to the next best-placed team, i.e. fourth-placed team.)
3	Dundalk	18	7	5	6	25	23	+2	26	Qualification for Europa Conference League first qualifying round
4	Sligo Rovers	18	8	1	9	19	23	−4	25	Qualification for Europa Conference League first qualifying round
5	Waterford	18	7	3	8	17	22	−5	24	
6	St Patrick's Athletic	18	5	6	7	14	17	−3	21	
7	Derry City	18	5	5	8	18	18	0	20	
8	Finn Harps	18	5	5	8	15	24	−9	20	
9	Shelbourne (R)	18	5	4	9	13	22	−9	19	Qualification for relegation play-offs
10	Cork City (R)	18	2	5	11	10	30	−20	11	Relegation to League of Ireland First Division

Source: SSE Airtricity League, Soccerway
Rules for classification: 1) Points; 2) Goal difference; 3) Goals scored.
(C) Champions; (R) Relegated

==== Results summary ====
Overall								Home						Away					
Pld	W	D	L	GF	GA	GD	Pts	W	D	L	GF	GA	GD	W	D	L	GF	GA	GD
18	5	6	7	14	16	−2	21	3	3	3	7	6	+1	2	3	4	7	10	−3

Last updated: 10 November 2020.

==== Results by round ====
Round	1	2	3	4	5	6	7	8	9	10	11	12	13	14	15	16	17	18
Ground	H	A	A	H	A	H	H	H	A	A	H	A	H	A	A	H	A	H
Result	L	W	L	W	D	L	W	D	L	L	D	D	W	W	L	D	D	L
Position	6	4	7	4	5	7	4	4	6	8	8	8	6	4	7	6	6	6

Updated to match(es) played on 10 November 2020. Source: 2020 League of Ireland Premier Division
A = Away; H = Home; W = Win; D = Draw; L = Loss

==== Matches ====
Win Draw Loss

14 February 2020 1	St Patrick's Athletic	0–1	Waterford	Inchicore, Dublin 8
19:45 GMT	Jamie Lennon (yellow card) 4'; Rory Feely (yellow card) 58'	Report	Scott Allardice (yellow card) 7'; Kevin O'Connor 49'; Kevin O'Connor (yellow card) 81'	Stadium: Richmond Park; Attendance: 2,807; Referee: Sean Grant

21 February 2020 2	Sligo Rovers	0–2	St Patrick's Athletic	Sligo, County Sligo
19:45 GMT	Niall Morahan (yellow card) 45'; John Dunleavy (yellow card) 63'	Report	Ronan Hale 26'; Chris Forrester 35'; Ronan Hale (yellow card) 45'; Ollie Younger (yellow card) 65'; Ollie Younger (yellow card) 68' (red card)	Stadium: The Showgrounds; Attendance: 2,145; Referee: Neil Doyle

28 February 2020 3	Shelbourne	1–0	St Patrick's Athletic	Drumcondra, Dublin 3
19:45 GMT	Jaze Kabia 23'; Gary Deegan (yellow card) 34'; Shane Farrell (yellow card) 47'; Alex O'Hanlon (yellow card) 72'; Karl Sheppard (yellow card) 90'	Report	Rory Feely (yellow card) 11'; Lee Desmond (yellow card) 50'; Darragh Markey (yellow card) 68'; Rory Feely (yellow card) 70' (red card); Dean Clarke (yellow card) 90'	Stadium: Tolka Park; Attendance: 3,054; Referee: Sean Grant

6 March 2020 4	St Patrick's Athletic	1–0	Cork City	Inchicore, Dublin 8
19:45 GMT	Billy King 56'; Chris Forrester (yellow card) 68'; Shane Griffin (yellow card) 83'	Report	Henry Ochieng (yellow card) 47'; Reyon Dillon (yellow card) 73'	Stadium: Richmond Park; Attendance: 2,078; Referee: Derek Tomney

31 July 2020 5	Dundalk	1–1	St Patrick's Athletic	Dundalk, County Louth
19:45 GMT	Patrick Hoban 23'; Daniel Cleary (yellow card) 71'; David McMillan (yellow card) 90+4'	Report	Robbie Benson 25'; Jamie Lennon (yellow card) 49'; Rory Feely (yellow card) 66'	Stadium: Oriel Park; Attendance: 0 (Behind closed doors); Referee: Rob Harvey
Note: Game postponed from 13 March due to the Coronavirus pandemic. RTÉ Man of the Match: Robbie Benson

3 August 2020 6	St Patrick's Athletic	0–2	Derry City	Inchicore, Dublin 8
19:45 GMT	David Titov (yellow card) 21'; Dan Ward (yellow card) 27'; Rory Feely (yellow card) 67'	Report	Ally Gilchrist (yellow card) 32'; James Akintunde 50'; Conor McCormack 72'	Stadium: Richmond Park; Attendance: 0 (Behind closed doors); Referee: Rob Hennessey
Note: Ponstponed from 24 February due to a waterlogged pitch. Further postponed from 16 March due to the Coronavirus pandemic.

7 August 2020 7	St Patrick's Athletic	2–0	Finn Harps	Inchicore, Dublin 8
19:45 GMT	Georgie Kelly 14'; Georgie Kelly 28'; Jamie Lennon (yellow card) 36'; Chris Forrester (yellow card) 63'; Shane Griffin (yellow card) 89'	Report	David Webster (yellow card) 58'; Raffaele Cretaro (yellow card) 63'; Kosovar Sadiki (yellow card) 66'; Stephen Folan (yellow card) 89'	Stadium: Richmond Park; Attendance: 0 (Behind closed doors); Referee: Sean Grant
Note: Game postponed from 20 March due to the Coronavirus pandemic.

16 August 2020 8	St Patrick's Athletic	0–0	Shamrock Rovers	Inchicore, Dublin 8
17:00 GMT	David Titov (yellow card) 26'; Shane Griffin (yellow card) 37'; Jamie Lennon (yellow card) 41'; Shane Griffin (yellow card) 49' (red card); Jordan Gibson (yellow card) 63'	Report	Graham Burke (yellow card) 69'; Jack Byrne (yellow card) 82'; Liam Scales (yellow card) 90+5'	Stadium: Richmond Park; Attendance: 0 (Behind closed doors); Referee: Paul McLaughlin
Note: Game postponed from 27 March due to the Coronavirus pandemic.

22 August 2020 9	Bohemians	2–0	St Patrick's Athletic	Phibsborough, Dublin 7
14:00 GMT	Anthony Breslin 16'; Danny Grant (yellow card) 22'; Andre Wright 24'; Keith Ward (yellow card) 52'; Kris Twardek (yellow card) 66'; Anthony Breslin (yellow card) 82'	Report	Lee Desmond (yellow card) 18'; Robbie Benson (yellow card) 70'	Stadium: Dalymount Park; Attendance: 0 (Behind closed doors); Referee: Derek Tomney
Note: Game postponed from 3 April due to the Coronavirus pandemic.

4 September 2020 10	Waterford	3–0	St Patrick's Athletic	Waterford City, County Waterford
19:45 GMT	Ali Coote 24'; John Martin 28'; Matty Smith (yellow card) 34'; Robbie Weir (yellow card) 58'; Shane Griffin (yellow card) 71'; Michael O'Connor 80'	Report	Georgie Kelly (yellow card) 78'	Stadium: RSC; Attendance: 0 (Behind closed doors); Referee: Paul McLoughlin
Note: Game postponed from 10 April due to the Coronavirus pandemic.

12 September 2020 11	St Patrick's Athletic	0–0	Sligo Rovers	Inchicore, Dublin 8
17:00 GMT	Jamie Lennon (yellow card) 38'; Robbie Benson (yellow card) 58'; Rory Feely (yellow card) 59'; Luke McNally (yellow card) 80'; Darragh Markey (yellow card) 90+5'	Report	Jesse Devers (yellow card) 55'; Niall Morahan (yellow card) 58'; Ronan Coughlan (yellow card) 66'; Will Seymore (yellow card) 73'; Niall Morahan (yellow card) 90+2' (yellow-red card); Lewis Banks (yellow card) 90+5'	Stadium: Richmond Park; Attendance: 0 (Behind closed doors); Referee: Derek Tomney
Note: Game postponed from 17 April due to the Coronavirus pandemic.

18 September 2020 12	Derry City	0–0	St Patrick's Athletic	Derry, Northern Ireland
17:45 GMT	Ciaron Harkin (yellow card) 32'	Report	Chris Forrester (yellow card) 32'; Martin Rennie (yellow card) 90+1'; Luke McNally (yellow card) 90+2'	Stadium: Ryan McBride Brandywell Stadium; Attendance: 0 (Behind closed doors); Referee: Rob Harvey
Note: Game postponed from 20 April due to the Coronavirus pandemic.

26 September 2020 13	St Patrick's Athletic	2–0	Shelbourne	Inchicore, Dublin 8
19:30 GMT	Chris Forrester 17'; Georgie Kelly (yellow card) 31'; Jordan Gibson (yellow card) 40'; Rory Feely 55'	Report	Shane Farrell (yellow card) 84'	Stadium: Richmond Park; Attendance: 0 (Behind closed doors); Referee: Rob Hennessey
Note: Game postponed from 24 April due to the Coronavirus pandemic.

3 October 2020 14	Cork City	1–2	St Patrick's Athletic	Turners Cross, County Cork
17:00 GMT	Cian Coleman (yellow card) 30'; Gearóid Morrissey 45+2'	Report	Alan Bennett 8' (o.g.); Jordan Gibson 10'; Shane Griffin (yellow card) 17'; Georgie Kelly (yellow card) 51'; Chris Forrester (yellow card) 65'; Jamie Lennon (yellow card) 90+4'	Stadium: Turners Cross; Attendance: 100 (Restricted capacity); Referee: Derek Tomney
Note: Game postponed from 27 April due to the Coronavirus pandemic.

28 October 2020 15	Finn Harps	3–2	St Patrick's Athletic	Ballybofey, County Donegal
19:45 GMT	Adam Foley 3'; Stephen Folan 11'; Ryan Connolly (yellow card) 37'; Shane McEleney (yellow card) 58'; Tony McNamee (yellow card) 63'; Ryan Connolly 74' (pen.); Mark McGinley (yellow card) 83'; David Webster (yellow card) 88'; Ruairi Harkin (yellow card) 90+2'	Report	Luke McNally 12'; Georgie Kelly 54'; Georgie Kelly (yellow card) 70'; Jamie Lennon (yellow card) 90'	Stadium: Finn Park; Attendance: 0 (Behind closed doors); Referee: Rob Harvey
Note: Game postponed from 8 May due to the Coronavirus pandemic.

1 November 2020 16	St Patrick's Athletic	1–1	Dundalk	Inchicore, Dublin 8
17:45 GMT	Chris Forrester (yellow card) 58'; Robbie Benson 64'	Report	Patrick Hoban 23'; Patrick Hoban (yellow card) 58'; Jordan Flores (yellow card) 63'	Stadium: Richmond Park; Attendance: 0 (Behind closed doors); Referee: Paul McLaughlin
Note: Game postponed from 1 May due to the Coronavirus pandemic. Further postponed from 9 October due to a positive COVID-19 case within the St Patrick's Athletic squad.

4 November 2020 17	Shamrock Rovers	0–0	St Patrick's Athletic	Tallaght, Dublin 24
19:45 GMT	Joey O'Brien (yellow card) 11'; Joey O'Brien (yellow card) 70' (red card); Aaron Greene (yellow card) 86'	Report	Jamie Lennon (yellow card) 90+2'	Stadium: Tallaght Stadium; Attendance: 0 (Behind closed doors); Referee: Sean Grant
Note: Game postponed from 15 May due to the Coronavirus pandemic. Further postponed from 27 October due to two positive COVID-19 cases within the Shamrock Rovers squad. RTÉ Man of the Match: Lee Desmond

9 November 2020 18	St Patrick's Athletic	1–2	Bohemians	Inchicore, Dublin 8
19:30 GMT	Shane Griffin (yellow card) 28'; Jordan Gibson 37'; Rory Feely (yellow card) 62'; Chris Forrester (yellow card) 64'	Report	Jonathan Lunney (yellow card) 36'; Danny Grant 45+1'; Andre Wright 63' (pen.)	Stadium: Richmond Park; Attendance: 0 (Behind closed doors); Referee: Rob Hennessey
Note: Game postponed from 22 May due to the Coronavirus pandemic.

=== FAI Cup ===
Win Draw Loss

10 August 2020 First Round	Finn Harps	1–0	St Patrick's Athletic	Ballybofey, County Donegal
19:45 GMT	Ryan Connolly 5'; David Webster (yellow card) 19'; Aidy Delap (yellow card) 74'; Aidy Delap (yellow card) 82'	Report	Darragh Markey (yellow card) 34'; David Titov (yellow card) 77'	Stadium: Finn Park; Attendance: 0 (Behind closed doors); Referee: Neil Doyle

=== EA Sports Cup ===
Win Draw Loss

13 April 2020 Second Round	St Patrick's Athletic	v	N/A
N/A GMT		Report
Note: Competition deferred indefinitely due to the Coronavirus pandemic.

=== Leinster Senior Cup ===
Win Draw Loss

Fourth Round	St Patrick's Athletic	v	N/A
		Report
Note: Competition abandoned at the Third Round stage due to the Coronavirus pandemic.

=== Friendlies ===
Win Draw Loss

==== Pre-season ====
16 January 2020	Cobh Ramblers	1–5	St Patrick's Athletic	Mayfield, County Cork
20:00 GMT	Stephen O'Leary 54'	Report	Jamie Lennon 32'; James Doona 34'; James Doona 51'; Ronan Hale 68'; Ian Bermingham 76'	Stadium: Lotamore Grounds; Attendance: 100 (Est.); Referee: Anthony Buttimer

18 January 2020	Fermoy	0–6	St Patrick's Athletic	Fermoy, County Cork
14:00 GMT		Report	Billy King 12'; Billy King 31'; Ronan Hale 33' (pen.); Robbie Benson 51'; Billy King 59' (pen.); Lee Desmond 90'	Stadium: Carrig Park; Attendance: 250 (Est.)

26 January 2020	St Patrick's Athletic	0–0	Wexford	Blanchardstown, Dublin 15
14:00 GMT		Report		Stadium: TUD Blanchardstown Campus; Attendance: 100 (Est.)

29 January 2020	Athlone Town	1–6	St Patrick's Athletic	Athlone, County Westmeath
19:30 GMT	Mamoud Mansaray 35'	Report	Jason McClelland 14'; Chris Forrester 27'; Martin Rennie 44'; Ronan Hale 87'; Ronan Hale 88'; Jake Walker 90'	Stadium: Athlone Town Stadium; Attendance: 100 (Est.)

4 February 2020	Galway United	1–2	St Patrick's Athletic	Athlone, County Westmeath
19:00 GMT	Timmy Molloy 75'	Report	James Doona 54'; Ronan Hale 56'	Stadium: DPD Park; Attendance: 100 (Est.)

7 February 2020	St Patrick's Athletic	1–0	Drogheda United	Inchicore, Dublin 8
19:45 GMT	Darragh Markey 75'	Report		Stadium: Richmond Park; Attendance: 500 (Est.); Referee: Neil Doyle

==== Mid-season ====
17 July 2020	St Patrick's Athletic	2–1	Longford Town	Inchicore, Dublin 8
19:30 GMT	Ronan Hale 63'; Ronan Hale 72'	Report	Callum Warfield 85'	Stadium: Richmond Park; Attendance: 0 (Behind closed doors)

18 July 2020	UCD	0–3	St Patrick's Athletic	Belfield, Dublin 4
12:00 GMT			Jason McClelland 28'; Ben McCormack 50'; Jordan Gibson 70'	Stadium: UCD Bowl; Attendance: 0 (Behind closed doors)

22 July 2020	Drogheda United	1–1	St Patrick's Athletic	Drogheda, County Louth
19:30 GMT	Jordan Adeyemo 60'	Report	Jason McClelland 75'	Stadium: United Park; Attendance: 0 (Behind closed doors); Referee: Derek Tomney
