= Martin Rennie =

Martin Rennie may refer to:

- Martin Rennie (football manager) (born 1975), Scottish football manager
- Martin Rennie (footballer) (born 1994), Scottish footballer
