= 2024–25 Ross County F.C. season =

Ross County
2024–25 season
- Chairman: Roy MacGregor
- Manager: Don Cowie
- Ground: Victoria Park; Dingwall, Ross-shire (Capacity: 6,541)
- Scottish Premiership: 11th (relegated via play-offs)
- Scottish Cup: Fourth round
- Scottish League Cup: Second round
- Top goalscorer: League: Ronan Hale (12); All: Ronan Hale (18)
- Highest home attendance: 6,372 vs. Celtic, Premiership, 6 October 2024
- Lowest home attendance: 1,027 vs. Stirling Albion, League Cup, 27 July 2024
- Average home league attendance: 4,372
Home colours	Away colours

The 2024–25 season was Ross County's sixth consecutive season in the Scottish Premiership and the club's 12th season overall in the top flight of Scottish football. Ross County also competed in the Scottish Cup entering in the fourth round and Scottish League Cup entering in the group stage.

== Results and fixtures ==
Win Draw Loss Postponed

=== Pre-season and friendlies ===
6 July 2024	Brora Rangers	1–2	Ross County	Brora
15:00	Wallace 25'		Trialist 33'; Brophy 66'	Stadium: Dudgeon Park

9 July 2024	Clachnacuddin	0–6	Ross County	Inverness
19:45		Report	Brophy; Samuel; White; Macleod	Stadium: Grant Street Park

=== Scottish Premiership ===
3 August 2024 1	Motherwell	0–0	Ross County	Motherwell
15:00		Report		Stadium: Fir Park; Attendance: 4,353; Referee: John Beaton

10 August 2024 2	Ross County	1–1	Dundee United	Dingwall
15:00	Hale 90+5'	Report	Babunski 48'	Stadium: Victoria Park; Attendance: 4,169; Referee: Craig Napier

24 August 2024 3	Rangers	6–0	Ross County	Glasgow
15:00	Dessers 18', 58'; Matondo 45', 69'; Lawrence 65'; Danilo 90'	Report		Stadium: Hampden Park; Attendance: 48,832

31 August 2024 4	Ross County	0–1	Aberdeen	Dingwall
15:00		Report	Nisbet 90+8'	Stadium: Victoria Park; Attendance: 5,480; Referee: Euan Anderson

14 September 2024 5	Ross County	2–0	Dundee	Dingwall
15:00	Wright 6'; White 45+4 pen.'	Report		Stadium: Victoria Park; Attendance: 4,068; Referee: Euan Anderson

21 September 2024 6	Ross County	3–3	St Johnstone	Dingwall
15:00	Hale 19'; Samuel 87'; Wright 90+7'	Report	Wright 44'; Clark 60', 84'	Stadium: Victoria Park; Attendance: 3,063; Referee: Dan McFarlane

28 September 2024 7	Heart of Midlothian	1–1	Ross County	Edinburgh
15:00	Shankland 90+6'	Report	Hale 35'	Stadium: Tynecastle Park; Attendance: 18,399; Referee: Iain Snedden

6 October 2024 8	Ross County	1–2	Celtic	Dingwall
12:00	Hale 43 pen.'	Report	McGregor 76'; Kühn 88'	Stadium: Victoria Park; Attendance: 6,372; Referee: Kevin Clancy

18 October 2024 9	St Johnstone	3–0	Ross County	Perth
15:00	Kimpioka 16', 45'; Kirk 90+4'	Report	Campbell (red card) 31'; Telfer (red card) 78'	Stadium: McDiarmid Park; Attendance: 3,688; Referee: John Beaton

26 October 2024 10	Ross County	2–1	Kilmarnock	Dingwall
15:00	White 61'; Wright 82 o.g.'	Report	Ndaba 39'; Donnelly (red card) 60'	Stadium: Victoria Park; Attendance: 3,419; Referee: Matthew MacDermid

30 October 2024 11	Ross County	0–0	Hibernian	Dingwall
19:45		Report		Stadium: Victoria Park; Attendance: 3,468; Referee: Grant Irvine

2 November 2024 12	St Mirren	0–0	Ross County	Paisley
15:00		Report		Stadium: St Mirren Park; Attendance: 6,142; Referee: Don Robertson

9 November 2024 13	Dundee United	3–0	Ross County	Dundee
15:00	Stephenson 57'; Dalby 68'; Stirton 90+2'	Report		Stadium: Tannadice Park; Attendance: 8,349; Referee: John Beaton

23 November 2024 14	Ross County	2–1	Motherwell	Dingwall
15:00	Hale 47'; Nisbet 54'	Report	Robinson 83'	Stadium: Victoria Park; Attendance: 3,410; Referee: Chris Graham

30 November 2024 15	Celtic	5–0	Ross County	Glasgow
15:00	Scales 10'; McCowan 27'; Bernardo 35'; McGregor 36'; Idah 40'	Report		Stadium: Celtic Park; Attendance: 58,436; Referee: Calum Scott

8 December 2024 16	Ross County	0–3	Rangers	Dingwall
12:00		Report	Igamane 6'; Danilo 37'; Tavernier 86'	Stadium: Victoria Park; Attendance: 6,011; Referee: Kevin Clancy

14 December 2024 17	Hibernian	3–1	Ross County	Edinburgh
15:00	Gayle 45+6'; Youan 73 pen.' J.Campbell 90+4'	Report	E.Campbell 3'	Stadium: Easter Road; Attendance: 14,885; Referee: Lloyd Wilson

21 December 2024 18	Ross County	1–2	St Mirren	Dingwall
15:00	Efete 46'	Report	Iacovitti 27'; Tanser (red card) 55'; Smyth 89'	Stadium: Victoria Park; Attendance: 3,271; Referee: Iain Snedden

26 December 2024 19	Dundee	0–3	Ross County	Dundee
15:00		Report	Chilvers 23'; Nisbet 70'; White 78 pen.'	Stadium: Dens Park; Attendance: 5,207; Referee: Don Robertson

29 December 2024 20	Ross County	2–2	Heart of Midlothian	Dingwall
15:00	Nisbet 90+7'; White 90+9'	Report	Wilson 2', 48'	Stadium: Victoria Park; Attendance: 4,994; Referee: Ross Hardie

2 January 2025 21	Aberdeen	1–2	Ross County	Aberdeen
15:00	Nisbet 45+11'	Report	Wright 24'; Chilvers 60'	Stadium: Pittodrie Stadium; Attendance: 17,007; Referee: David Dickinson

5 January 2025 22	Kilmarnock	0–1	Ross County	Kilmarnock
15:00		Report	Harmon 86'	Stadium: Rugby Park; Attendance: 5,426; Referee: Steven McLean

11 January 2025 23	Ross County	1–4	Celtic	Dingwall
12:00	White 60 pen.'	Report	Furuhashi 40', 81'; Engels 90+6 pen.' McCowan 90+8'	Stadium: Victoria Park; Attendance: 6,254; Referee: Matthew MacDermid

25 January 2024 24	Ross County	1–1	Hibernian	Dingwall
15:00	Hale 87 pen.'	Report	Levitt 42'	Stadium: Victoria Park; Attendance: 4,003; Referee: David Dickinson

2 February 2025 25	Rangers	4–0	Ross County	Glasgow
15:00	Hagi 18', 25'; Souttar 35'; Tavernier 79 pen.'	Report		Stadium: Ibrox Stadium; Attendance: 46,973; Referee: Steven McLean

15 February 2025 26	Motherwell	0–3	Ross County	Motherwell
15:00		Report	Hale 32', 59'; Randall 89'	Stadium: Fir Park; Attendance: 3,973; Referee: Iain Snedden

22 February 2025 27	Ross County	3–1	Dundee	Dingwall
15:00	Phillips 18'; Wright 47'; Chilvers 49'	Report	Murray 4'	Stadium: Victoria Park; Attendance: 4,075; Referee: Matthew MacDermid

26 February 2025 28	St Johnstone	1–0	Ross County	Perth
19:45	Kirk 66'	Report		Stadium: McDiarmid Park; Attendance: 3,576; Referee: Dan McFarlane

1 March 2025 29	Ross County	1–0	Kilmarnock	Dingwall
15:00	Phillips 35'	Report		Stadium: Victoria Park; Attendance: 3,385; Referee: David Dickinson

15 March 2025 30	Heart of Midlothian	2–0	Ross County	Edinburgh
15:00	Kabangu 26'; Grant 89'	Report		Stadium: Tynecastle Park; Attendance: 18,648; Referee: Calum Scott

30 March 2025 31	Ross County	0–1	Dundee United	Dingwall
14:30		Report	Graham 74'	Stadium: Victoria Park; Attendance: 4,088; Referee: Steven McLean

5 April 2025 32	Ross County	0–1	Aberdeen	Dingwall
15:00		Report	Morris 33'	Stadium: Victoria Park; Attendance: 5,194; Referee: Lloyd Wilson

12 April 2025 33	St Mirren	3–2	Ross County	Paisley
15:00	Boyd-Munce 36'; Ayunga 50'; Idowu 86'	Report	Hale 22'; White 63'	Stadium: St Mirren Park; Attendance: 6,318; Referee: Calum Scott

26 April 2025 34	Kilmarnock	2–0	Ross County	Kilmarnock
15:00	Anderson 36'; Donnelly 69'	Report		Stadium: Rugby Park; Attendance: 5,425; Referee: Nick Walsh

3 May 2025 35	Ross County	1–3	Heart of Midlothian	Dingwall
15:00	Hale 26'	Report	Shankland 40', 58'; Forrest 82'	Stadium: Victoria Park; Attendance: 4,181; Referee: Don Robertson

10 May 2025 36	St Johnstone	2–1	Ross County	Perth
15:00	Balodis 31'; Watt 60'	Report	Samuel 41'; Ashworth (red card) 90+11'	Stadium: McDiarmid Park; Attendance: 4,355; Referee: John Beaton

14 May 2025 37	Dundee	1–1	Ross County	Dundee
19:45	Tiffoney 55'	Report	Hale 90+6 pen.'	Stadium: Dens Park; Attendance: 5,905; Referee: Nick Walsh

18 May 2025 38	Ross County	1–1	Motherwell	Dingwall
15:00	Hale 29'	Report	Ebiye 83'	Stadium: Victoria Park; Attendance: 4,170; Referee: Don Robertson

=== Premiership play-offs ===
22 May 2025 Final 1st leg	Livingston	1–1	Ross County	Livingston
20:00	Wilson 45+1'	Report	Hale 90+6 pen.'	Stadium: Almondvale Stadium; Attendance: 2,643; Referee: John Beaton

26 May 2025 Final 2nd leg	Ross County	2–4 (3–5 agg.)	Livingston	Dingwall
20:00	Nisbet 7'; Hale 24'	Report	Smith 39'; Wilson 57'; Muirhead 61'; Yengi 90+7'	Stadium: Victoria Park; Attendance: 4,138; Referee: Nick Walsh

=== Scottish League Cup ===
==== Group stage ====
13 July 2024	Stranraer	1–3	Ross County	Stranraer
15:00	Lang 81'	Report	White 6', 32'; Brophy 83'	Stadium: Stair Park; Attendance: 515; Referee: Lloyd Wilson

20 July 2024	Ross County	2–1	Raith Rovers	Dingwall
15:00	White 29'; Harmon 87'	Report	Smith 51'	Stadium: Victoria Park; Attendance: 1,228; Referee: Euan Anderson

23 July 2024	Hamilton Academical	1–2	Ross County	Hamilton
19:45	Shaw 6'	Report	Hale 25'; White 28'	Stadium: New Douglas Park; Attendance: 561; Referee: Matthew McDermid

27 July 2024	Ross County	3–0	Stirling Albion	Dingwall
15:00	Hale 29', 43'; Brown 80'	Report		Stadium: Victoria Park; Attendance: 1,027; Referee: Nick Walsh

==== Knockout phase ====
17 August 2024 Second round	The Spartans	1–0	Ross County	Edinburgh
15:00	Henderson 46'	Report		Stadium: Ainslie Park; Attendance: 712; Referee: Dan McFarlane

=== Scottish Cup ===
18 January 2025 Fourth round	Ross County	2–3 (a.e.t.)	Livingston	Dingwall
15:00	White 56'; Hale 73'	Report	Muirhead 45+1 pen.' Montaño 62'; Shinnie 119'	Stadium: Victoria Park; Attendance: 1,802; Referee: Chris Graham

== Squad statistics ==
=== Captains ===
No.	Pos	Nat	Name	No of games	Notes
8	MF	(England)	Connor Randall	41	Club Captain
26	FW	(Scotland)	Jordan White	3	Vice-Captain
5	DF	(Scotland)	Ricki Lamie	1	

=== Appearances ===
As of 26 May 2025

No.	Pos	Nat	Player	Total		Premiership		Scottish Cup		League Cup		Play-offs	
No.	Pos	Nat	Player	Apps	Goals	Apps	Goals	Apps	Goals	Apps	Goals	Apps	Goals
1	GK	(Scotland) SCO	Ross Laidlaw	18	0	15	0	0	0	3	0	0	0
2	DF	(Republic of Ireland) IRL	James Brown	31	1	18+7	0	1	0	4+1	1	0	0
3	DF	(Wales) WAL	Ryan Leak	20	0	14+2	0	0	0	4	0	0	0
4	DF	(England) ENG	Akil Wright	45	4	38	4	1	0	4	0	2	0
6	MF	(Scotland) SCO	Scott Allardice	20	0	6+10	0	0+1	0	1+2	0	0	0
8	MF	(England) ENG	Connor Randall	43	1	37	1	0+1	0	3	0	2	0
9	FW	(Northern Ireland) NIR	Ronan Hale	41	18	28+7	12	1	1	3	3	2	2
10	MF	(England) ENG	Noah Chilvers	32	3	25+5	3	1	0	1	0	0	0
11	FW	(England) ENG	Kieran Phillips	18	2	9+7	2	0+1	0	0	0	0+1	0
12	DF	(United States) USA	Jonathan Tomkinson	13	0	11+2	0	0	0	0	0	0	0
14	FW	(England) ENG	Jack Grieves	24	0	8+13	0	0+1	0	1+1	0	0	0
15	DF	(Wales) WAL	Zac Ashworth	13	0	7+3	0	0+1	0	0	0	1+1	0
16	DF	(England) ENG	George Harmon	32	2	21+3	1	1	0	3+2	1	1+1	0
18	GK	(Germany) GER	Jordan Amissah	22	0	19	0	1	0	0	0	2	0
19	DF	(England) ENG	Elijah Campbell	31	1	25+3	1	1	0	0	0	2	0
20	DF	(Poland) POL	Kacper Łopata	30	0	29	0	1	0	0	0	0	0
23	MF	(Australia) AUS	Josh Nisbet	39	4	26+10	3	1	0	0	0	2	1
24	DF	(Democratic Republic of the Congo) COD	Michee Efete	26	1	12+8	1	0	0	2+2	0	2	0
25	FW	(Wales) WAL	Alex Samuel	28	2	7+14	2	0	0	1+4	0	1+1	0
26	FW	(Scotland) SCO	Jordan White	45	11	20+17	6	1	1	4+1	4	1+1	0
30	DF	(Scotland) SCO	Dylan Smith	8	0	0+6	0	0	0	1	0	0+1	0
33	MF	(Scotland) SCO	Andrew Macleod	6	0	0+2	0	0	0	2+2	0	0	0
34	FW	(England) ENG	George Robesten	11	0	2+8	0	0	0	0+1	0	0	0
35	DF	(England) ENG	Will Nightingale	9	0	6	0	0	0	1	0	2	0
41	GK	(Scotland) SCO	Jayden Reid	0	0	0	0	0	0	0	0	0	0
42	MF	(Liberia) LBR	Nohan Kenneh	18	0	14+1	0	1	0	0	0	2	0
Players who left the club during the season
5	DF	(Scotland) SCO	Ricki Lamie	3	0	0	0	0	0	3	0	0	0
7	MF	(Canada) CAN	Victor Loturi	15	0	2+8	0	0	0	4+1	0	0	0
12	MF	(England) ENG	Max Sheaf	0	0	0	0	0	0	0	0	0	0
15	MF	(Scotland) SCO	Aidan Denholm	17	0	8+7	0	0	0	1+1	0	0	0
17	MF	(Scotland) SCO	Jay Henderson	0	0	0	0	0	0	0	0	0	0
21	MF	(Scotland) SCO	Charlie Telfer	11	0	1+5	0	0+1	0	2+2	0	0	0
22	GK	(Scotland) SCO	Jack Hamilton	5	0	2+1	0	0	0	2	0	0	0
27	FW	(Scotland) SCO	Eamonn Brophy	16	1	3+8	0	0	0	3+2	1	0	0
31	GK	(Scotland) SCO	Logan Ross	0	0	0	0	0	0	0	0	0	0
32	DF	(Scotland) SCO	Connall Ewan	0	0	0	0	0	0	0	0	0	0
36	MF	(Scotland) SCO	Jamie Williamson	1	0	0	0	0	0	0+1	0	0	0
43	DF	(Scotland) SCO	Josh Reid	9	0	2+4	0	0	0	2+1	0	0	0

=== Goalscorers ===
Rank	No.	Nat.	Po.	Name	Premiership	Scottish Cup	League Cup	Play-offs	Total
1	9	(Northern Ireland)	FW	Ronan Hale	12	1	3	2	18
2	26	(Scotland)	FW	Jordan White	6	1	4	0	11
3	4	(England)	DF	Akil Wright	4	0	0	0	4
3	23	(Australia)	MF	Josh Nisbet	3	0	0	1	4
4	10	(England)	MF	Noah Chilvers	3	0	0	0	3
5	11	(England)	FW	Kieran Phillips	2	0	0	0	2
5	16	(England)	DF	George Harmon	1	0	1	0	2
5	25	(Wales)	FW	Alex Samuel	2	0	0	0	2
6	2	(Republic of Ireland)	DF	James Brown	0	0	1	0	1
6	19	(England)	DF	Elijah Campbell	1	0	0	0	1
6	24	(Democratic Republic of the Congo)	DF	Michee Efete	1	0	0	0	1
6	27	(Scotland)	FW	Eamonn Brophy	0	0	1	0	1
Own goals					1	0	0	0	1
Total					37	2	10	2	49
As of 26 May 2025

== Team statistics ==
=== League table ===
Pos	Team	Pld	W	D	L	GF	GA	GD	Pts	Qualification or relegation (Note: Teams play each other three times (33 matches), before the league is split into two groups (the top six and the bottom six).)
8	Motherwell	38	14	7	17	46	63	−17	49	
9	Kilmarnock	38	12	8	18	45	64	−19	44	
10	Dundee	38	11	8	19	57	77	−20	41	
11	Ross County (R)	38	9	10	19	37	65	−28	37	Qualification for the Premiership play-off final
12	St Johnstone (R)	38	9	5	24	38	68	−30	32	Relegation to Championship

Rules for classification: 1) Points; 2) Goal difference; 3) Goals scored; 4) Head-to-head points; 5) Head-to-head goal difference; 6) Play-off (only if deciding champion, UEFA competitions qualification, second stage group allocation or relegation).
(R) Relegated

=== League cup table ===
Pos	Team	Pld	W	PW	PL	L	GF	GA	GD	Pts	Qualification	ROS	RAI	HAM	STI	STR
1	Ross County	4	4	0	0	0	10	3	+7	12	Qualification for the second round	—	2–1	—	3–0	—
2	Raith Rovers	4	2	1	0	1	7	4	+3	8		—	—	p1–1	—	2–1
3	Hamilton Academical	4	1	0	2	1	5	3	+2	5		1–2	—	—	0–0p	—
4	Stirling Albion	4	0	2	0	2	2	8	−6	4		—	0–3	—	—	p2–2
5	Stranraer	4	0	0	1	3	4	10	−6	1		1–3	—	0–3	—	—

Rules for classification: 1) goal difference, 2) goals scored, 3) away goals scored, 4) matches won, 5) away matches won, 6) drawing of lots.

== Transfers ==
=== In ===
Date	Player	From	Fee
27 June 2024	(England) Will Nightingale	(England) AFC Wimbledon	Loan
1 July 2024	(Scotland) Ricki Lamie	(Scotland) Motherwell	Free
4 July 2024	(Scotland) Jack Hamilton	(Scotland) Livingston	Free
5 July 2024	(Scotland) Charlie Telfer	(Scotland) Airdrieonians	Free
8 July 2024	(England) Akil Wright	(England) Stockport County	Undisclosed
9 July 2024	(Northern Ireland) Ronan Hale	(Northern Ireland) Cliftonville	Undisclosed
24 July 2024	(England) Jack Grieves	(England) Watford	Loan
26 July 2024	(Scotland) Aidan Denholm	(Scotland) Heart of Midlothian	Loan
31 July 2024	(England) Noah Chilvers	(England) Colchester United	Undisclosed
22 August 2024	(Australia) Josh Nisbet	(Australia) Central Coast Mariners	Free
29 August 2024	(England) Elijah Campbell	(England) Everton	Loan
29 August 2024	(Poland) Kacper Łopata	(England) Barnsley	Loan
6 December 2024	(Germany) Jordan Amissah	(England) Sheffield United	Free
1 January 2025	(Liberia) Nohan Kenneh	(Scotland) Hibernian	Loan
6 January 2025	(England) Kieran Phillips	(England) Huddersfield Town	Undisclosed
16 January 2025	(Wales) Zac Ashworth	(England) Blackpool	Loan
16 January 2025	(United States) Jonathan Tomkinson	(England) Norwich City	Loan

=== Out ===
Date	Player	To	Fee
30 May 2024	(England) Yan Dhanda	(Scotland) Heart of Midlothian	Free
30 May 2024	(Scotland) Adam Mackinnon	(Scotland) Inverness Caledonian Thistle	Free
30 May 2024	(England) Jordan Tillson	(England) Bath City	Free
30 May 2024	(Scotland) Matthew Wright	(Scotland) Nairn County	Free
1 June 2024	(Scotland) Jay Henderson	(Scotland) Ayr United	Loan
6 June 2024	(Scotland) Kyle Turner	(Scotland) Partick Thistle	Free
19 June 2024	(Scotland) Ross Callachan	(Scotland) Motherwell	Free
3 July 2024	(Scotland) Calum Brown	(Scotland) Forres Mechanics	Loan
5 July 2024	(Scotland) Alister Morrison	(Scotland) Nairn County	Loan
9 July 2024	(England) Jack Baldwin	(England) Northampton Town	Undisclosed
10 July 2024	(Scotland) Simon Murray	(Scotland) Dundee	Undisclosed
10 July 2024	(England) Josh Sims	(England) Yeovil Town	Free
27 July 2024	(Scotland) Logan Ross	(Scotland) Huntly	Loan
2 August 2024	(Scotland) Jamie Williamson	(Scotland) Nairn County	Loan
29 August 2024	(Scotland) Connall Ewan	(Scotland) Inverness Caledonian Thistle	Loan
30 August 2024	(England) George Robesten	(Scotland) Brora Rangers	Loan
30 September 2024	(Scotland) Dylan Smith	(Scotland) Arbroath	Loan
3 October 2024	(Scotland) Andrew Macleod	(Scotland) Brora Rangers	Loan
9 January 2025	(Scotland) Eamonn Brophy	(Scotland) Falkirk	Loan
10 January 2025	(England) Max Sheaf	(England) Gateshead	Free
23 January 2025	(Scotland) Ricki Lamie	(Scotland) Hamilton Academical	Loan
28 January 2025	(Canada) Victor Loturi	(Canada) CF Montréal	Free
30 January 2025	(Scotland) Jack Hamilton	(Scotland) Livingston	Free
13 February 2025	(Scotland) Josh Reid	(Scotland) Partick Thistle	Loan
14 February 2025	(Scotland) Logan Ross	(Scotland) Clachnacuddin	Loan
18 February 2025	(Scotland) Charlie Telfer	(Scotland) Hamilton Academical	Loan
