= Darragh Markey =

Irish footballer

Personal information
- Date of birth: 23 May 1997 (age 29)
- Place of birth: Dublin, Ireland
- Height: 1.70 m (5 ft 7 in)
- Position: Attacking midfielder

Team information
- Current team: Derry City
- Number: 10

Youth career
- –2014: Cherry Orchard
- 2014–2016: St Patrick's Athletic

Senior career*
Years	Team	Apps	(Gls)
2015–2020	St Patrick's Athletic	94	(3)
2021–2025	Drogheda United	159	(9)
2026–	Derry City	22	(1)

International career
2014	Republic of Ireland U17	1	(0)
2015	Republic of Ireland U18		
- * Club domestic league appearances and goals as of 12:48, 9 November 2026 (GMT)

Darragh Markey (born 23 May 1997) is an Irish professional footballer for League of Ireland Premier Division club Derry City. He previously spent six seasons with St Patrick's Athletic and five seasons with Drogheda United.

== Club career ==
=== Youth career ===
Markey played his youth football with Cherry Orchard, winning the Under 17 FAI Umbro Cup with a 5–2 win over Leeds AFC in the final at Turners Cross on 3 May 2014. At the Ballyfermot club Markey played alongside future League of Ireland players Maxim Kouogun, Josh Collins and Derek Daly among others. Markey's form for the Orchard attracted interest from St Patrick's Athletic, who signed him for their under 19's side ahead of the 2014–15 season. This turned out to be a terrific season for both Markey as he won the league's Player of the Season award and also for the team as they won the Under 19 SSE Airtricity League with a 3–2 win over Derry City under 19's in the final at Maginn Park. The team included several players that broke through to the St. Pat's first team and beyond in the League of Ireland, Scottish Premiership and English Football Leagues, including Jamie McGrath, Rory Feely, Jack Bayly, Fuad Sule and Paul Rooney.

=== St Patrick's Athletic ===
==== 2015 season ====
Ahead of the St Patrick's Athletic senior team's 2015 season, Markey was called up to the first team for the season, given the number 21 shirt, he would also remain with the under 19's while still eligible. He made his first team debut on 9 February 2015, aged just 17 years old, when he came off the bench in a 7–0 win at home to Tolka Rovers in the Leinster Senior Cup. Markey made late substitute appearances in the President's Cup away to Dundalk and the first game of the 2015 League of Ireland Premier Division season away to Shamrock Rovers, his first Dublin Derby. Markey went on to make a further 5 appearances in the first team that season.

==== 2016 season ====
In January 2016, Markey went on trial with Scottish Premier League champions Celtic, scoring in a trial game vs Kilmarnock. Nothing came of the move as Markey decided to take up the scholarship offer between St Pat's and NUI Maynooth, taking up a degree in finance at the college. To secure the degree, Markey would have to get the necessary points on his Leaving Cert, which he sat in June 2016. With the importance of his studies having to come before his football, the first half of 2016 turned out to be less productive for Markey as he made 7 league appearances and two league cup appearances that season (all 9 coming on from the substitutes bench) as Pat's won the 2016 League Cup.

==== 2017 season ====
Markey changed squad number to the number 14 ahead of the 2017 season. On 17 April Markey made his first start for the first team in a win over Bray Wanderers in the League Cup. He then made his first league start 4 days later against Cork City at Richmond Park. His performances in these games stood out and earned him plaudits from fans, pundits and most importantly manager Liam Buckley, who kept him in the starting 11. He was nominated for the League of Ireland Premier Division Player of the Month for May 2017 but just lost out to Ryan Delaney. He went on to make a total of 18 league appearances, 22 in all competitions and his form in those games saw him voted as St Patrick's Athletic Young Player of the Year by the club's fans.

==== 2018 season ====
Markey's shirt number changed again to number 15 ahead of the 2018 season. He started the season out of the starting 11, having to come off the bench in the first few games but regained his spot in the attacking midfielder role in the 0–0 draw with Dundalk. He scored his first senior goal on 15 May 2018 in a 5–2 win over Derry City at Richmond Park. His next goal came on 10 August when he opened the scoring in a 5–0 win over Inchicore Athletic in the FAI Cup first round. The season proved to be a disappointment for his side as they missed out on European football once again, which saw the departure of Liam Buckley as manager. On a personal level for Markey however, the season was another big step in his development, making 36 appearances and scoring 2 goals.

==== 2019 season ====
Following on from a full season as a regular starter, Markey was given the number 8 shirt for the 2019 season. Markey had to wait until 15 March 2019 for his first appearance of the season under new manager Harry Kenny, coming on as a substitute in a 2–0 loss away to Waterford. He had to wait a month for his next appearance, making his first start of the season in a 1–1 draw away to Cork City. From then on he remained a mainstay in the team and on 17 May he scored his first goal of the season, opening the scoring in the Dublin derby against Bohemians with a looping header over James Talbot in the 40th minute. Markey saw his first taste of European football when he came off the bench away to IFK Norrköping of Sweden in a UEFA Europa League Qualifier, assisting Conor Clifford's goal in a 2–1 loss for Pat's. With the side struggling in front of goal, manager Harry Kenny was replaced by Stephen O'Donnell following a shock cup exit to UCD in late August and in O'Donnell's first match, Markey scored in a 2–1 win away to Finn Harps on 6 September 2019. He finished the season with 30 appearances and 2 goals in all competitions.

==== 2020 season ====
The 2020 season was a difficult one for Markey as the league season was halved due to the Coronavirus pandemic which also saw the League Cup and Leinster Senior Cup abandoned. As a result of this, Markey struggled for game time, playing in 11 of the club's 19 league and cup games, starting just 3 of them as his side finished in 6th place, missing out on European football on the final day of the season. Markey left the club at the end of the season, having made 116 appearances and scoring 4 goals for the Saints.

=== Drogheda United ===
On 29 November 2020, Markey signed for newly promoted Drogheda United ahead of the 2021 season. He made his debut in the opening game of the season, a 1–0 win at home to Waterford on 19 March 2021. His first goal for the club came on 8 May, opening the scoring in a 7–0 win away to Waterford at the RSC as the home side fielded their under-19 squad due to a COVID-19 outbreak in the first team squad. Markey scored the second goal in a 3–1 home victory against Finn Harps on 2 July, and netted again on the penultimate day of the season at home against Longford Town. He finished the season with 3 goals in 36 appearances in all competitions as his side finished in a respectable 7th place. On 10 December 2021, Markey signed a new contract with the club for the 2022 season. On 14 March 2022, he sustained a broken foot in a 2–0 defeat to Derry City at the Ryan McBride Brandywell Stadium on just his 5th appearance of the season, with the injury requiring surgery. Markey scored his first goal of the season on 29 July 2022 in a 5–1 win over Athlone Town in the FAI Cup. He had to wait until the final day of the season for his first league goal of the year, opening the scoring in a 2–0 win over relegated Finn Harps on 6 November 2022. Markey finished his second season at the club with 2 goals in 26 appearances in all competitions. On 9 December 2022 Markey signed a new deal with Drogheda for the 2023 season despite reported interest from Bohemians. On 10 February, he scored a brace against Athlone Town which saw Drogheda advance to the quarter finals of the Leinster Senior Cup. On 9 June, he scored the winning goal in injury time in a 2-1 league victory over his former club St. Patrick's Athletic. Markey played in 33 of Drogheda's 36 league games, as the club avoided relegation and climbed up to 7th place. On 10 December 2023, he signed a new contract with the club. On 10 November 2024, he was part of the stating 11 in the 2024 FAI Cup final as his side defeated Derry City 2–0 in the Aviva Stadium. On 13 November 2025, Drogheda confirmed that Markey would be departing at the end of his contract, despite efforts to extend his contract, having scored 13 goals in 179 appearances in his 5 seasons with the club.

=== Derry City ===
On 21 November 2025, Markey signed for League of Ireland Premier Division club Derry City on a two-year-contract. On 31 January 2026, Markey scored on his debut in a 1–0 win over Shamrock Rovers in the 2026 President of Ireland's Cup at Tallaght Stadium. On 8 November 2026, he was an unused substitute in the 2026 FAI Cup final as his side defeated Waterford 1–0 at the Aviva Stadium.

== International career ==
Markey played for the Republic of Ireland U17 and Republic of Ireland U18 team as well as the Republic of Ireland schools team, which he was called up to for his performances for his school, Coláiste Phádraig in Lucan. He was nominated for the FAI School's International Player of the Year in March 2016 but lost out to Connor Ellis.

== Career statistics ==
As of match played 30 October 2026

Club	Season	League			Cup		League Cup		Europe		Other		Total	
Club	Season	Division	Apps	Goals	Apps	Goals	Apps	Goals	Apps	Goals	Apps	Goals	Apps	Goals
St Patrick's Athletic	2015	LOI Premier Division	4	0	0	0	1	0	0 (Note: Appearances in UEFA Europa League)	0	3 (Note: 2 appearances in Leinster Senior Cup, 1 appearance in the President of Ireland's Cup)	0	8	0
St Patrick's Athletic	2016	LOI Premier Division	7	0	0	0	2	0	0	0	0 (Note: Appearances in the Leinster Senior Cup)	0	9	0
St Patrick's Athletic	2017	LOI Premier Division	18	0	0	0	2	0	–		2	0	22	0
St Patrick's Athletic	2018	LOI Premier Division	30	1	1	1	1	0	–		4	0	36	2
St Patrick's Athletic	2019	LOI Premier Division	25	2	2	0	1	0	1	0	1	0	30	2
St Patrick's Athletic	2020	LOI Premier Division	10	0	1	0	–		–		–		11	0
St Patrick's Athletic	Total		94	3	4	1	7	0	1	0	10	0	116	4
Drogheda United	2021	LOI Premier Division	35	3	1	0	–		–		–		36	3
Drogheda United	2022	LOI Premier Division	24	1	2	1	–		–		–		26	2
Drogheda United	2023	LOI Premier Division	33	1	3	0	–		–		1	2	37	3
Drogheda United	2024	LOI Premier Division	34	1	4	0	–		–		4 (Note: 3 appearances in the Leinster Senior Cup & 1 appearance in the 2024 League of Ireland Premier Division Promotion/Relegation Playoff)	0	42	1
Drogheda United	2025	LOI Premier Division	33	3	3	1	–		—		3 (Note: 1 appearance in the President of Ireland's Cup; 2 appearances in the Leinster Senior Cup)	0	39	4
Drogheda United	Total		159	9	13	2	–		—		7	2	179	13
Derry City	2026	LOI Premier Division	22	1	0	0	–		0	0	1 (Note: Appearance in the President of Ireland's Cup)	1	23	2
Career Total			275	13	17	3	7	0	1	0	18	3	318	19

== Honours ==
=== Club ===
St Patrick's Athletic

- League of Ireland Cup (2): 2015, 2016

Drogheda United

- FAI Cup: 2024

Derry City

- FAI Cup: 2026
- President of Ireland's Cup: 2026

=== Individual ===
- League of Ireland Player of the Month: November 2024, March 2025
