= Conor Kearns =

Irish association footballer

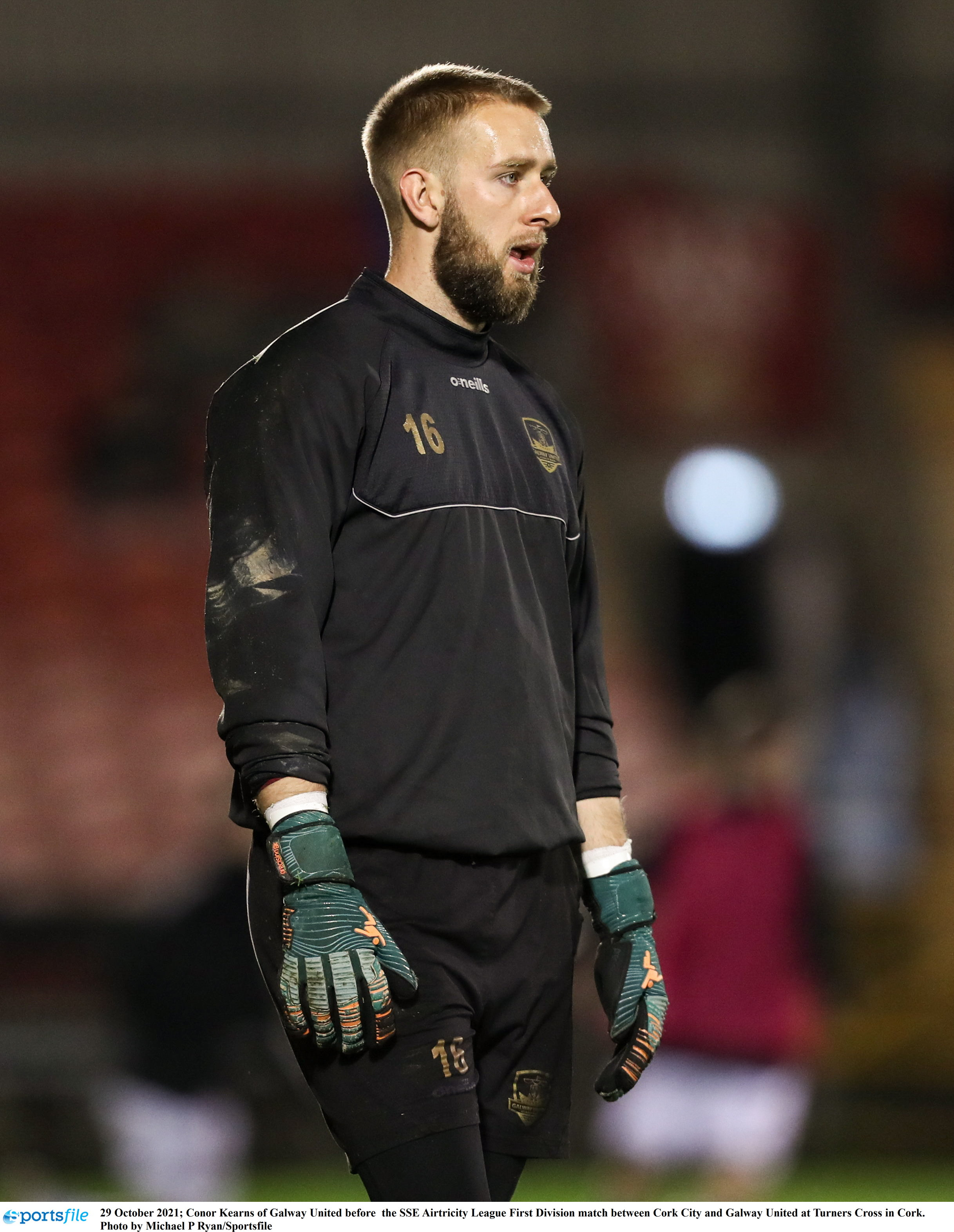
- Kearns with Galway United in 2021

Personal information
- Date of birth: 6 May 1998 (age 28)
- Place of birth: Dublin, Ireland
- Height: 1.88 m (6 ft 2 in)
- Position: Goalkeeper

Team information
- Current team: Shelbourne

Youth career
- Templeogue United
- 2015–2017: UCD

Senior career*
Years	Team	Apps	(Gls)
2016–2019	UCD	55	(0)
2020	St Patrick's Athletic	0	(0)
2021–2022	Galway United	55	(0)
2023–	Shelbourne	94	(0)
2026	→ Dundalk (loan)	6	(0)

International career
2019	Republic of Ireland U21	1	(0)
- * Club domestic league appearances and goals as of 00:51, 31 October 2026 (UTC)

Conor Kearns (born 6 May 1998) is an Irish professional footballer who plays for League of Ireland Premier Division club Shelbourne. He previously spent five years with UCD, as well as a season with St Patrick's Athletic, two seasons with Galway United and a season on loan at Dundalk.

== Club career ==
=== Early career ===
Raised in the Dublin suburb of Templeogue, Kearns started playing football with his local side Templeogue United. He signed for UCD in 2015, playing for their under 19 side for the 2015, 2016 and 2017 seasons. In April 2017, Kearns scored a Bicycle kick in the 92nd minute away to Cork City under 19's. The goal went viral and later featured on popular TV show Soccer AM. He was part of the squad that won the League of Ireland U19 Division in September 2016. He featured in both legs of UCD's UEFA Youth League tie against Molde FK of Norway in September/October 2017. The first leg saw his side win 2–1, while they lost 2–1 away from home in the second leg before losing 5–4 on penalties, despite Kearns saving one of Molde's penalties.

=== UCD ===
Kearns' first involvement with the UCD senior team came towards the end of the 2016 season, when he was named in the matchday squad but remained as an unused substitute in 7 games. Although he again didn't make an appearance, 2017 saw him take another step closer to the number 1 shirt, as he was second choice keeper for much of the year, remaining an unused substitute in 22 of his side's 28 league games. He made his debut at senior level on the opening night of the 2018 League of Ireland First Division, in a 2–1 win over Dublin rivals Shelbourne. On 14 September 2018, Kearns and his UCD side drew 1–1 with Finn Harps to win the League of Ireland First Division. He made 32 appearances in all competitions over the season. The 2019 season was Kearns' first season at League of Ireland Premier Division level. With such a young squad, coupled with the mid-season departure of many of the team's better players including Gary O'Neill, Neil Farrugia & Conor Davis, meant the side were in a relegation battle with Finn Harps for the entirety of the season. On 15 July 2019, UCD beat Bohemians 1–0 at the UCD Bowl. After the match, Kearns celebrated in front of the Bohemians fans who had been booing him for what they perceived as time wasting, which Bohs captain Derek Pender confronted Kearns over his celebrations which resulted in a brawl on the pitch between both sets of players, while Kearns had bottles thrown at him from the visiting supporters who also tried to attack him as he left the pitch. For their part in the brawl, both Kearns and Pender were sent off by referee Derek Tomney which resulted in one match bans but Kearns was given an additional 5-game ban, with Pender receiving an additional 3 games. Speaking on the incident, Kearns denied any deliberate time wasting, stating I was playing the game with an injury and whenever I went down to get treatment, there was no way it was timewasting – it would've been pushing it to say it was that, but they were on my case any chance they got. But, in terms of having to justify it, there's a lot of people who have been in the situation I have been in that hasn't had to deal with the same backlash that I have. So, to a degree, you can feel unfortunate, but at the end of the day it was handbags. Nobody was hurt, there was no real malice – there was just pushing and shoving but it was probably a bit unfortunate and naïve on my part.. UCD were later awarded a 3–0 win as Bohemians had fielded an ineligible player, the suspended Danny Mandroiu. Kearns made a total of 33 appearances in all competitions as UCD were relegated after finishing bottom of the league with just 19 points.

=== St Patrick's Athletic ===
On 27 November 2019, it was announced that Kearns had signed for St Patrick's Athletic, under new manager Stephen O'Donnell, joining former UCD teammate Jason McClelland who had signed a few weeks earlier. Due to the postponement of football in Ireland as a result of the Coronavirus pandemic, Kearns had to wait until 10 August 2020 to make his competitive debut for the club, a 1–0 loss away to Finn Harps in the FAI Cup. This proved to be his only appearance over the course of what was a shortened season, due to the form of first choice keeper Brendan Clarke, who was voted Player of the Year. On 26 November 2020, Kearns announced that he had left the club, following the end of his contract.

=== Galway United ===
Kearns signed for League of Ireland First Division club Galway United on 23 January 2021, under manager John Caulfield. He made his debut for the club on the opening night of the season in a 0–0 draw with Shelbourne on 26 March 2021 at Eamonn Deacy Park.

=== Shelbourne ===
On 18 November 2022, Kearns signed for League of Ireland Premier Division club Shelbourne.

==== Dundalk loan ====
On 1 January 2026, Kearns signed for League of Ireland Premier Division club Dundalk on a season-long loan deal. He made 7 appearances in all competitions before on 13 March 2026, he was forced off with a serious knee injury following a 17-minute stoppage in play to deal with his injury in a 5–0 win at home to Waterford, with the injury keeping him out of action for the rest of the season.

== Personal life ==
Kearns' mother Pamela is a Labour Party councillor in the Templeogue Rathfarnham constituency. He spoke in May 2019 about helping with canvassing for his mother in the run up to elections.

== International career ==
Kearns made his debut for the Republic of Ireland U21s on 6 February 2019, playing in a friendly against Republic of Ireland Amateurs and keeping a clean sheet in a 1–0 win. On 21 May 2019, he was named in the 2019 Toulon Tournament squad by manager Stephen Kenny. He played in the 3rd/4th place playoff against Mexico U23s, replacing Caoimhín Kelleher in the 64th minute as Ireland drew 0–0 but lost 4–3 on penalties despite Kearns saving Érick Aguirre's penalty in the shootout. Kearns along with fellow St Patrick's Athletic teammates Lee Desmond and Shane Griffin, was called up to train with the Republic of Ireland senior squad on 31 August 2020, in what was new manager Stephen Kenny's first training session with the squad.

== Career statistics ==
As of match played 13 March 2026

Club	Season	League			National Cup		League Cup		Europe		Other		Total	
Club	Season	Division	Apps	Goals	Apps	Goals	Apps	Goals	Apps	Goals	Apps	Goals	Apps	Goals
UCD	2016	LOI First Division	0	0	0	0	0	0	—		0 (Note: Appearances in the Leinster Senior Cup)	0	0	0
UCD	2017	LOI First Division	0	0	0	0	0	0	—		0	0	0	0
UCD	2018	LOI First Division	25	0	4	0	2	0	—		1	0	32	0
UCD	2019	LOI Premier Division	30	0	1	0	0	0	—		2	0	33	0
UCD	Total		55	0	5	0	2	0	—		3	0	65	0
St Patrick's Athletic	2020	LOI Premier Division	0	0	1	0	—		—		—		1	0
Galway United	2021	LOI First Division	23	0	1	0	—		—		2 (Note: Appearances in 2021 League of Ireland First Division Play-offs)	0	26	0
Galway United	2022	LOI First Division	32	0	0	0	—		—		3 (Note: Appearances in 2022 League of Ireland First Division Play-offs)	0	35	0
Galway United	Total		55	0	1	0	—		—		5	0	61	0
Shelbourne	2023	LOI Premier Division	35	0	1	0	—		—		0	0	36	0
Shelbourne	2024	LOI Premier Division	36	0	2	0	—		4 (Note: Appearances in the UEFA Conference League)	0	0	0	42	0
Shelbourne	2025	LOI Premier Division	23	0	1	0	—		2 (Note: Appearances in the UEFA Champions League)	0	1 (Note: Appearance in the President of Ireland's Cup)	0	27	0
Shelbourne	2026	LOI Premier Division	0	0	—		—		—		—		0	0
Shelbourne	Total		94	0	4	0	—		6	0	1	0	105	0
Dundalk (loan)	2026	LOI Premier Division	6	0	0	0	—		—		1	0	7	0
Career Total			210	0	11	0	2	0	6	0	10	0	239	0

== Honours ==
=== Club ===
UCD

- League of Ireland First Division: 2018

Shelbourne

- League of Ireland Premier Division: 2024

=== Individual ===
- PFAI Team of the Year: 2023
