= Ronan Hale =

Northern Irish footballer (born 1998)

Personal information
- Full name: Ronan Aiden Connolly Shea Chapman Hale
- Date of birth: 8 September 1998 (age 28)
- Place of birth: Belfast, Northern Ireland
- Height: 1.78 m (5 ft 10 in)
- Position: Striker

Team information
- Current team: Gillingham
- Number: 10

Youth career
- Crusaders
- 2016–2017: Birmingham City

Senior career*
Years	Team	Apps	(Gls)
2017–2019	Birmingham City	0	(0)
2018	→ Derry City (loan)	31	(7)
2019	Crusaders	13	(3)
2019–2020	St Patrick's Athletic	10	(2)
2020–2022	Larne	65	(17)
2022–2024	Cliftonville	62	(32)
2024–2026	Ross County	55	(19)
2026–	Gillingham	33	(11)

International career^{‡}
2016–2017	Republic of Ireland U19	7	(3)
2018	Republic of Ireland U21	5	(2)
2025–	Northern Ireland	1	(0)
- * Club domestic league appearances and goals as of 10:32, 26 October 2026 (UTC) ‡ National team caps and goals as of 11:35, 11 June 2025 (UTC)

Ronan Aiden Connolly Shea Chapman Hale (born 8 September 1998) is a Northern Irish professional footballer who plays as a striker for EFL League Two club Gillingham and the Northern Ireland national team.

He previously played for Birmingham City, Derry City, Crusaders, St Patrick's Athletic, Larne, Cliftonville and Ross County. His brother Rory Hale is also a professional footballer, as was their grandfather Danny Hale.

== Club career ==
=== Early career ===
Growing up in Newington, Belfast, Hale started off playing his youth football with local club Crusaders. It was there that he caught the eye and earned a move to England with Birmingham City. During this time, his brother Rory was playing at his side's city rivals, Aston Villa, which made the homesickness he suffered a little easier with both living in Birmingham. He scored 28 goals in 23 games for Birmingham City U21 side in his first season at the club, before moving up to the Birmingham City U23 side, where he scored four goals in 16 appearances.

=== Derry City loan ===
Hale signed a six-month loan deal with League of Ireland Premier Division side Derry City alongside his brother Rory Hale on 3 January 2018. He made his debut in senior football on 12 February 2018 away to Waterford at the RSC. His first senior goals came on 12 March 2018 when he scored a hat-trick in a 5–0 win over Limerick at the Brandywell. He followed this up 4 days later by scoring again in a 5–1 win over Bray Wanderers. His loan deal with Derry was extended until the end of the season on 28 June 2018. This allowed him his first taste of European football as he featured in both legs of the club's UEFA Europa League tie against Dinamo Minsk of Belarus. Derry lost the first leg 2–0 at home, leaving them with an uphill battle to go through in the second leg. After an early goal from Ally Roy, Derry performed well and after conceding a first half equaliser, Hale scored the winner in the 75th minute but it was not enough despite a late Derry push as they were knocked out 3–2 on aggregate. The 16 September 2018 saw Hale win the first trophy of his senior career when he scored in a 3–1 win over Cobh Ramblers as Derry City won the League of Ireland Cup for the record 11th time. Hale ended the season, with 12 goals in 40 appearances in his first season in senior football. He returned to Birmingham City at the end of his loan spell.

=== Crusaders ===
On 11 January 2019, Birmingham City announced that Hale's contract had been terminated by mutual consent. It was announced shortly after that Hale had moved back to Belfast, signing a two-and-a-half-year contract with Crusaders. After his brother Rory, Ronan became the fourth member of his family to represent the club, following in his grandfather Danny and great-uncle Gerry's footsteps. He made his debut in a 1–0 defeat to Linfield on 19 January 2019. His first goal for the club came a week later when he scored in a 3–1 win away to Institute. He was part of the squad that won the County Antrim Shield following a 4–3 thriller against Linfield in the final in March. He was an unused substitute in the Irish Cup Final as Crusaders beat Ballinamallard United 3–0 in the final at Windsor Park. He finished the season with 3 goals in 18 appearances.

=== St Patrick's Athletic ===
==== 2019 season ====
It was announced on 1 August 2019 that Hale had signed an 18-month contract with Dublin club St Patrick's Athletic, given the number 25 shirt, keeping him at the club until the end of the 2020 season. Hale made his debut the following day away to Cork City, coming off the bench for Ciarán Kelly in the 74th minute before scoring a 91st-minute winner to secure all three points for his new side with a 1–0 win. He went on to finish the season with nine appearances in all competitions and one goal.

==== 2020 season ====
Hale started the 2020 season off well, scoring an excellent goal in a 5–1 win pre-season friendly over Cobh Ramblers on 16 January 2020, dribbling past two defenders before finishing into the bottom right corner. Two days later, he scored a penalty in a 6–0 win against Fermoy in a friendly. He finished a pre-season in top form, scoring two goals against Athlone Town and the winner against Galway United to make it five goals in five games. He scored on his first start of the season, opening the scoring in a 2–0 win over Sligo Rovers at The Showgrounds. It was announced on 1 August 2020, exactly one year since he joined the club, that Hale had departed to sign for Larne of the NIFL Premiership.

=== Larne ===
Hale returned to the NIFL Premiership on 1 August 2020, signing for Larne. He scored a penalty in his first league game for Larne, as they beat Dungannon Swifts 3–0 on the opening day of the season.

In Larne's maiden European campaign Hale scored the winner in a first round 2021–22 UEFA Europa Conference League tie and in the next round his goal eliminated Aarhus Gymnastikforening

At the end of the 2021–22 NIFL Premiership season, he scored all four goals for Larne in the UEFA Europa Conference League play-off final match after coming on as a substitute as the club came back from 2–0 down against Glentoran. His goals in the 75th, 84th, 100th and 121st minutes included the fourth, dubbed a "wonder-goal" a 75 yard strike from just outside his own penalty box.

=== Cliftonville ===
On 26 May 2022, Hale signed for Cliftonville.

Hale scored on his debut in a 2022–23 UEFA Europa Conference League tie at FC DAC 1904 Dunajská Streda

On 4 May 2024, in his last game for the club, he scored twice in extra-time in a 3–1 win over Linfield as Cliftonville won the Irish Cup for the first time since 1979.

=== Ross County ===
On 9 July 2024, Hale signed for Scottish Premiership club Ross County on a three-year contract for an undisclosed fee. He scored 18 goals in 42 appearances in his first season in Scotland including a goal in each leg of the relegation play-offs but it was not enough to keep his side up as they were relegated to the Scottish Championship following a defeat to Livingston on 26 May 2025. In January 2026, he reportedly handed in a transfer request after the club turned down a £200,000 bid from EFL League Two side Gillingham for Hale.

=== Gillingham ===
On 29 January 2026, Hale signed for Gillingham on a two-and-a-half-year contract for an undisclosed fee. Hale made his debut for the club on 31 January 2026, appearing as a half-time substitute in a 4–1 defeat at home to Bromley.

== International career ==
=== Republic of Ireland ===
Hale played for Republic of Ireland under-19s in the 2017 UEFA European Under-19 Championship qualification. Both he and his brother Rory scored on their under-21 debuts in a friendly against Iceland in March 2018.

=== Northern Ireland ===
In May 2024, senior Northern Ireland manager Michael O'Neill stated that he would be open to calling up Hale to his squad if he was to opt to switch his international allegiance from the Republic of Ireland. His switch of allegiance was approved in January 2025. In March 2025, he was called up to the Northern Ireland squad for the first time, for their friendlies against Switzerland and Sweden, but was not capped in either game. He made his debut on 10 June 2025, starting in a 1–0 win over Iceland in a friendly at Windsor Park.

== Career statistics ==
=== Club ===
As of match played 10 October 2026

Appearances and goals by club, season and competition
Club	Season	League			National cup (Note: Includes FA Cup, FAI Cup, Irish Cup & Scottish Cup)		League cup (Note: Includes EFL Cup, League of Ireland Cup, Northern Ireland Football League Cup & Scottish League Cup)		Europe		Other		Total	
Club	Season	Division	Apps	Goals	Apps	Goals	Apps	Goals	Apps	Goals	Apps	Goals	Apps	Goals
Birmingham City	2017–18	EFL Championship	0	0	0	0	0	0	—		—		0	0
Birmingham City	2018–19	EFL Championship	0	0	0	0	0	0	—		—		0	0
Birmingham City	Total		0	0	0	0	0	0	—		—		0	0
Derry City (loan)	2018	LOI Premier Division	31	7	3	2	4	2	2 (Note: Appearances in the UEFA Europa League)	1	—		40	12
Crusaders	2018–19	NIFL Premiership	13	3	4	0	—		—		1 (Note: Appearances in the County Antrim Shield)	0	18	3
St Patrick's Athletic	2019	LOI Premier Division	7	1	2	0	—		—		0 (Note: Appearances in the Leinster Senior Cup)	0	9	1
St Patrick's Athletic	2020	LOI Premier Division	3	1	—		—		—		—		3	1
St Patrick's Athletic	Total		10	2	2	0	—		—		0	0	12	2
Larne	2020–21	NIFL Premiership	31	12	4	5	0	0	—		4 (Note: 2 appearances in the 2021 NIFL Premiership UEFA Europa Conference League play-offs; 2 appearances, 1 goal in the County Antrim Shield)	1	39	18
Larne	2021–22	NIFL Premiership	34	5	2	4	0	0	6 (Note: Appearances in UEFA Europa Conference League)	2	5 (Note: 2 appearances, 4 goals in the 2022 NIFL Premiership UEFA Europa Conference League play-offs; 3 appearances, 4 goals in the County Antrim Shield)	8	47	19
Larne	Total		65	17	6	9	0	0	6	2	9	9	86	37
Cliftonville	2022–23	NIFL Premiership	37	18	3	3	4	7	2	1	5 (Note: 2 appearances in the 2023 NIFL Premiership UEFA Europa Conference League play-offs; 1 appearance in the Scottish Challenge Cup; 2 appearances in the County Antrim Shield)	0	51	29
Cliftonville	2023–24	NIFL Premiership	25	14	5	8	1	0	—		0	0	31	22
Cliftonville	Total		62	32	8	11	5	7	2	1	5	0	82	51
Ross County	2024–25	Scottish Premiership	36	12	1	1	3	3	—		2 (Note: Appearances in the 2025 Scottish Premiership play-offs)	2	42	18
Ross County	2025–26	Scottish Championship	19	7	2	1	4	4	—		0	0	25	12
Ross County	Total		55	19	3	2	7	7	—		2	2	67	30
Gillingham	2025–26	EFL League Two	20	5	—		—		—		—		20	5
Gillingham	2025–26	EFL League Two	13	6	0	0	1	0	—		1	0	15	6
Gillingham	Total		33	11	0	0	1	0	—		1	0	35	11
Career total			269	91	26	24	17	16	10	4	18	11	341	146

=== International ===
As of match played 10 June 2025

Appearances and goals by national team and year
National team	Year	Apps	Goals
Northern Ireland
Northern Ireland	2025	1	0
Total		1	0

== Honours ==
Derry City

- League of Ireland Cup: 2018

Crusaders

- Irish Cup: 2018–19
- County Antrim Shield: 2018–19

St Patrick's Athletic

- Leinster Senior Cup: 2018–19

Larne

- County Antrim Shield: 2020–21, 2021–22

Cliftonville

- Irish Cup: 2023–24
