= Shane Griffin =

Irish footballer (born 1994)

Personal information
- Date of birth: 8 September 1994 (age 32)
- Place of birth: Carrigaline, County Cork, Ireland
- Position: Defender

Youth career
- –2011: Carrigaline United
- 2011–2017: Reading

Senior career*
Years	Team	Apps	(Gls)
2017–2019	Cork City	82	(1)
2020–2021	St Patrick's Athletic	28	(0)
2022–2024	Shelbourne	66	(2)
2025–2026	Cobh Ramblers	50	(1)
Total		226	(4)

International career^{‡}
2009	Republic of Ireland U16	1	(0)
2012–2013	Republic of Ireland U19	8	(0)
2014–2016	Republic of Ireland U21	12	(0)
- * Club domestic league appearances and goals as of 13:38, 29 July 2026 (UTC) ‡ National team caps and goals as of 23:20, 2 December 2025 (UTC)

Shane Griffin (born 8 September 1994) is an Irish former professional footballer who played as a defender. He spent his entire senior career playing in the League of Ireland, for Cork City, St Patrick's Athletic, Shelbourne and Cobh Ramblers.

== Club career ==
=== Youth Career ===
A native of Carrigaline, County Cork, Griffin began playing football with local club Carrigaline United before moving to the academy of English club Reading in the summer of 2011. At the end of the 2013–14 season, Griffin was one of five academy players offered a new contract with Reading.

=== Cork City ===
On 4 February 2017, Griffin returned home, signing for League of Ireland Premier Division club Cork City on a two-year contract. He made 29 league appearances as the club won the 2017 League of Ireland Premier Division title. On 5 November 2017, he was part of the team that defeated Dundalk on penalties in the 2017 FAI Cup final at the Aviva Stadium. On 4 November 2019, he featured against Dundalk in the 2018 FAI Cup final, but this time his side were defeated 2–1 at the Aviva Stadium. In December 2019, it was announced that Griffin would be leaving Cork City after scoring 2 goals in 111 appearances in his 3 seasons with the club

=== St Patrick's Athletic ===
On 3 December 2021, Griffin signed for League of Ireland Premier Division club St Patrick's Athletic on a two-year-contract. He made 14 appearances in his first season with the club. On 28 November 2021, Griffin was an unused substitute in the 2021 FAI Cup final, as his side defeated rivals Bohemians 4–3 on penalties following a 1–1 draw after extra time in front of a record FAI Cup final crowd of 37,126 at the Aviva Stadium.

=== Shelbourne ===
On 3 December 2021, it was announced that Griffin had signed for newly promoted League of Ireland Premier Division club Shelbourne. On 13 November 2022, he was part of the Shels team that suffered the biggest margin of defeat in FAI Cup history when they were defeated 4–0 by Derry City in the 2022 FAI Cup final. On 14 October 2022, he signed a contract extension until the end of the 2023 season. On 5 May 2023, he scored his first goal for the club in a 1–0 win at home to UCD at Tolka Park. On 23 December 2023, he signed a new one-year-contract with the club. He made 12 league appearances in 2024 as his side won the 2024 League of Ireland Premier Division. He departed the club at the end of the season having scored 2 goals in 77 games over his 3 seasons at the club.

=== Cobh Ramblers ===
On 6 January 2025, Griffin returned to him home county, signing for League of Ireland First Division club Cobh Ramblers. He scored 1 goal in 25 appearances in all competitions in his first season with the club. In November 2025, he was named in the PFAI First Division Team of the Year as voted by his fellow players in the league. In July 2026, Griffin retired from professional football, after scoring 1 goal in 57 appearances in all competitions during his 18 months in Cobh.

== International career ==
Having previously been capped up to Republic of Ireland under-21 level, Griffin along with fellow St Patrick's Athletic teammates Lee Desmond and Conor Kearns, was called up to train with the Republic of Ireland senior squad on 31 August 2020, in what was new manager Stephen Kenny's first training session with the squad.

== Career statistics ==
As of match played on 24 July 2026

Club	Season	Division	League		National Cup		League Cup		Europe		Other		Total	
Club	Season	Division	Apps	Goals	Apps	Goals	Apps	Goals	Apps	Goals	Apps	Goals	Apps	Goals
Reading U23	2016–17	—									3 (Note: Appearance in EFL Trophy)	0	3	0
Cork City	2017	LOI Premier Division	29	0	5	0	3	1	3 (Note: Appearance(s) in the UEFA Europa League)	0	2 (Note: 1 appearance in the Munster Senior Cup; 1 appearance in the President of Ireland's Cup)	0	42	1
Cork City	2018	LOI Premier Division	31	0	4	0	0	0	4 (Note: 2 appearances in the UEFA Champions League; 2 appearances in the UEFA Europa League)	0	2 (Note: 1 appearance in the Munster Senior Cup; 1 appearance in the President of Ireland's Cup)	0	41	0
Cork City	2019	LOI Premier Division	22	1	2	0	2	0	1	0	1 (Note: Appearance in the President of Ireland's Cup)	0	28	1
Cork City	Total		82	1	11	0	5	1	8	0	5	0	111	2
St Patrick's Athletic	2020	LOI Premier Division	14	0	0	0	—		—		—		14	0
St Patrick's Athletic	2021	LOI Premier Division	14	0	2	0	—		—		—		16	0
St Patrick's Athletic	Total		28	0	2	0	—		—		—		30	0
Shelbourne	2022	LOI Premier Division	28	0	4	0	—		—		—		32	0
Shelbourne	2023	LOI Premier Division	26	2	0	0	—		—		1 (Note: Appearance(s) in the Leinster Senior Cup)	0	27	2
Shelbourne	2024	LOI Premier Division	12	0	3	0	—		3 (Note: Appearance(s) in the UEFA Conference League)	0	0	0	18	0
Shelbourne	Total		66	2	7	0	—		3	0	1	0	77	2
Cobh Ramblers	2025	LOI First Division	30	1	2	0	—		—		3 (Note: 2 appearances in the 2025 League of Ireland First Division Promotion Playoffs; 1 appearance in the Munster Senior Cup)	0	35	1
Cobh Ramblers	2026	LOI First Division	20	0	1	0	—		—		1 (Note: Appearances in the Munster Senior Cup)	0	22	0
Cobh Ramblers	Total		50	1	3	0	—		—		4	0	57	1
Career Total			226	4	23	0	5	1	11	0	13	0	278	5

== Honours ==
=== Club ===
Cork City

- League of Ireland Premier Division (1): 2017
- FAI Cup (1): 2017
- President of Ireland's Cup (2): 2017, 2018
- Munster Senior Cup (3): 2017, 2018, 2018–19

St Patrick's Athletic

- FAI Cup (1): 2021

Shelbourne

- League of Ireland Premier Division (1): 2024

Cobh Ramblers

- Munster Senior Cup (1): 2024–25

=== Individual ===
- PFAI First Division Team of the Year (1): 2025
