= Impact of the COVID-19 pandemic on sports in the Republic of Ireland =

Consequences of the COVID-19 pandemic on sport in the Republic of Ireland

The COVID-19 pandemic in the Republic of Ireland has had a significant impact on the conduct of sports, affecting both competitive sports leagues and tournaments and recreational sports.

In March 2021, eir Sport's owner Eir announced it would not be bidding for the rights to sports events, as the closure of pubs in particular had made its business model difficult to sustain. However, eir Sport did vow to see out their existing contracts, including showing games from the 2021 National Hurling League and 2021 National Football League.

== Background ==
Countless sporting events were affected by the arrival of the virus on 29 February 2020. Following the Taoiseach's 12 March announcement from Washington, the Gaelic Athletic Association (GAA), Irish Rugby Football Union (IRFU) and Football Association of Ireland (FAI) all immediately announced the two-week suspension of games.

On 19 June, the Government of Ireland announced that all sporting activity in Ireland could resume from 29 June. A fund of €70 million was announced by the Department of Sport to get sport in Ireland restarted.

By late July, small numbers of spectators were permitted into games on both sides of the border.

On 7 August, TDs—including Minister of State for Financial Services, Credit Unions and Insurance Seán Fleming and Minister of State for Overseas Development Aid and Diaspora Colm Brophy—called for all sporting fixtures and events in Kildare, Laois and Offaly to be cancelled after a significant increase of COVID-19 cases in the three counties.

Under new restrictions announced by the Government of Ireland on 18 August, all sporting events had to take place behind closed doors again. Taoiseach Micheál Martin announced that all spectators from sporting events would be banned until at least 13 September.

As a second and third wave of COVID-19 rapidly arrived in the country from October and December 2020, Level 5 lockdown restrictions were reimposed nationally, which saw elite and professional sports continue behind closed doors, with no other matches or events permitted to take place, while all gyms, leisure centres, swimming pools, tennis and golf clubs closed at 6pm on New Year's Eve.

On 8 January 2021, the government announced it would be extending its Sports Capital Grant funding deadline for applications until 1 March.

Under a new plan for easing Level 5 restrictions announced by the Government on 30 March, elite-level senior GAA matches and training could resume from 19 April. From 26 April, outdoor sports facilities (such as pitches, golf courses and tennis courts) could reopen and underage non-contact outdoor training in pods of 15 could recommence for all exercise activities that could be delivered outdoors including dance.

== Impact by sport ==
=== Ball sports ===
==== Gaelic games of football and hurling ====
On 13 March 2020, Minister for Health Simon Harris said people returning from Spain or Italy would have to "not quite self-isolate" but "restrict their movements" upon returning to Ireland; this affected Tipperary, the reigning All-Ireland Hurling Champions, who had flown in advance to the Costa Blanca in Spain for a training camp.

On 15 March, footballer Dr Jack McCaffrey issued a video message thanking the public for their co-operation, which was relayed by Dublin GAA and media outlets—McCaffrey noting that he had shaven his beard to protect his patients. On 17 March, the GAA confirmed that the opening fixture of the 2020 All-Ireland Senior Football Championship, due to have taken place at Gaelic Park in The Bronx on 3 May, had been postponed. Also that day, Michael Carton, the former Dublin hurler who won the 2013 Leinster Senior Hurling Championship, revealed he had been in hospital since the previous weekend after testing positive for COVID-19.

Former Offaly county football team manager, Fr Tom Scully, who led the team to the 1969 All-Ireland Senior Football Championship Final, died in Dublin of COVID-19 on the morning of 7 April.

Former Dublin footballer Brian Stynes was stranded in Sydney, barred from leaving his hotel. On 14 April (the day after the Easter Monday public holiday), the GAA announced that—following the government's Good Friday three-week extension of restrictions—the 2020 All-Ireland Senior Football Championship and 2020 All-Ireland Senior Hurling Championship would be postponed "until further clarity on the current situation is available. However, it is the Association's view that it is highly unlikely these will be rescheduled any time before the beginning of July, at the earliest".

On 29 April, the administrator Noel Walsh (i.e. "Mr Clare Football") died of pneumonia resulting from COVID-19.

On 6 May, the GAA announced that it expected no inter-county matches would take place until October at the earliest and asked all counties to cease preparations until 20 July, while unveiling a COVID-19 Advisory Group whose members included Pat O'Neill.

Inter-county games resumed in October, with the 2020 All-Ireland Senior Football Championship and the 2020 All-Ireland Senior Hurling Championship completed in December.

2021 brought sanctions after numerous breaches of the GAA's ban on collective training, as well as Government Level 5 restrictions. Among the football team managers suspended were Dessie Farrell (Dublin), Ronan McCarthy (Cork) and Séamus McEnaney (Monaghan).

On 10 February 2021, the GAA announced that there would be no county team activity (i.e. training or games) until 4 April (Easter Sunday) at the earliest.

Under a new plan for easing restrictions announced by the Government on 30 March, GAA senior inter-county teams could return to collective inter-county training from 19 April.

On 2 June, the GAA confirmed that 100 spectators would be allowed to attend club and inter-county matches in Ireland from Monday 7 June, with a higher total of 200 permitted in grounds with a minimum capacity of 5,000.

On 30 July, it was confirmed that 40,000 fans would be allowed to attend the All-Ireland finals and semi-finals in Croke Park while Ireland's World Cup qualifiers in September were set to be played before a crowd of 25,000.

Under a plan for easing most COVID-19 restrictions by 22 October announced by the Government on 31 August, sports stadiums could return to 50% capacity and outdoor events could be permitted to operate at 75% capacity from 6 September, while all further restrictions for both indoor and outdoor sports events could be eased on 22 October. The GAA confirmed on 1 September that an additional 1,150 tickets would be available with 41,150 people allowed to attend the 2021 All-Ireland Senior Football Championship Final on 11 September.

After a sudden rise in COVID-19 figures, on 19 October, the Government published a revised plan for the easing of restrictions on 22 October, with sporting venues allowed to operate at 100% capacity.

==== Cricket ====
In January 2021, the second match of Ireland's One Day International series against the United Arab Emirates was postponed for six days due to an outbreak of COVID-19 within the UAE team. Shortly afterwards, the match was postponed for a second time when four more UAE players tested positive for COVID-19.

On 5 March 2021, Ruhan Pretorius tested positive for COVID-19 in Chittagong while playing for the Ireland Wolves cricket team in Bangladesh in 2020–21. The match was suspended. His test was later found to be a false positive.

==== Golf ====
On 30 March 2020, the European Tour confirmed that golf's Irish Open, down for Mount Juliet between 28 and 31 May, would be postponed. On 14 August, the European Tour announced that the 2020 Irish Open would be held behind closed doors at Galgorm Castle the following month; this allowed for the looser quarantine rules in use north of the border at the time as 14 days was a requirement in the south.

On 7 April, the sold-out J. P. McManus Pro-Am at Adare Manor, and an important charity fundraiser for Ireland's midwest region, was postponed until 2021.

==== Rugby ====
On 12 March 2020, the 2019–20 Pro14 was suspended indefinitely.

Ireland's final two Six Nations rugby fixtures against Italy and France were postponed. The IRFU postponed the Italy game, scheduled for 7 March, on 26 February. after it met with Minister for Health Simon Harris for an hour at the Department of Health. In spite of this, thousands of Italian fans, who were permitted to fly into Dublin on the weekend of the game, were not checked at Dublin Airport for signs of the disease. On 20 March, the IRFU announced pay deferrals of between 10% and 50% for staff, including each of its professional players.

On 9 June, a Pro14 Board meeting agreed on 22 August as a target date for resumption of the suspended competition in a truncated format that would reduce the regular season from 21 to 15 rounds of fixtures, while Ulster's postponed Round 13 fixture against Benetton was recorded as a 0–0 draw (as was one other fixture, with the four teams involved being awarded two points each). Leinster and Ulster contested the rescheduled 2020 Pro14 Grand Final at the Aviva Stadium on 12 September, with Leinster winning a third consecutive title.

5 August brought the announcement of the rescheduled completion of the Six Nations that October, though the Six Nations Under 20s Championship would go without a winner; Ireland had been leading that competition, with three victories from their three games, before the pandemic brought play to a halt. Ireland completed the 2020 Six Nations with a win against Italy in Dublin on 24 October and a loss against France in Paris on 31 October.

On 6 October, Munster Rugby suspended training and cancelled its weekly press conference ahead of the team's 2020–21 Pro14 Round 2 game against Edinburgh at Thomond Park. Munster announced that one player had tested positive for COVID-19, with six others self-isolating after being deemed close contacts; this was the first instance of a senior player within Irish rugby testing positive for COVID-19, although cases in the Munster and Ulster Academies had previously occurred. Munster stated that the player, who was asymptomatic, had not travelled to Llanelli for the Round 1 fixture, a victory against Scarlets. Two days later, on 8 October, Munster announced that another player (linked to the first case) had tested positive for COVID-19 and that, separately, the virus had been detected in another of its academy players. However, Munster returned to training on 9 October.

Connacht's Round 4 game against Benetton in Galway was postponed after COVID-19 struck the Italian team; Munster's Round 5 game against the same team in Treviso followed suit. Connacht's Round 5 game away to Dragons was also postponed due to an outbreak of COVID-19 within the squad of the Newport-based team. Leinster's Round 8 game away to Scarlets was postponed due to an outbreak of COVID-19 within the squad of their Welsh opponents, while Connacht's home fixture against Ospreys in the same round was postponed due to a player for the Swansea-based team testing positive for COVID-19.

The Round 9 meeting of Munster and Leinster at Thomond Park, scheduled for 26 December, was postponed two days previously due to COVID-19. However, Leinster confirmed that tests it carried out on all staff and players returned negative results. Then, on 29 December, Leinster Rugby confirmed that two of its players had received positive results for COVID-19 following tests carried out the previous day, that several others were self-isolating after being deemed close contacts, but that the rest of the team would return to training.

Former Ireland international Rob Kearney cited escape from the COVID-19 pandemic as influencing his decision to leave Leinster after 15 years to join the Western Force in late 2020; Kearney quarantined with his fiancée in a Brisbane hotel in late December before arriving in Perth in January 2021.

On 11 January 2021, European Professional Club Rugby (EPCR) announced the "temporary suspension" of the 2020–21 European Rugby Champions Cup (involving all four Irish provinces) and the 2020–21 European Rugby Challenge Cup after the French government decided that Top 14 club participation in those competitions was "too great a public health risk" for that country's people.

On 28 January, the Irish Rugby Football Union (IRFU) announced the cancellation of the 2020–21 All-Ireland League because of the pandemic.

On 2 April 2021, Leinster advanced to the 2020–21 European Rugby Champions Cup quarter-final at the expense of French club Toulon after their match in Dublin was cancelled when a Toulon squad member (who did not travel from France) tested positive for COVID-19.

On 30 April, the IRFU announced that Ireland's summer tour to Fiji would not occur as COVID-19 cases had increased throughout the Pacific nation.

On 27 May, Ulster Rugby said four players had tested positive for (but were asymptomatic with) COVID-19 and that the Pro14 Rainbow Cup fixture against Scarlets would not occur, leading to Scarlets being awarded four points.

A 2021 British & Irish Lions tour to South Africa game against the Bulls was postponed, then cancelled due to several positive COVID tests in the Bulls' camp, and a second match against the Sharks was added instead.

Finlay Bealham had been due to play in the first test of the 2022 Ireland rugby union tour of New Zealand in Dunedin on 2 July but COVID-19 meant he could not.

==== Soccer ====
On 10 March 2020, Slovakia suspended all sports events for two weeks, 17 days before the Republic of Ireland were due to play the country's football team in Bratislava in their UEFA Euro 2020 play-off. However, on 17 March, the entire tournament—among which were four games scheduled for Ireland—was postponed until 2021 to allow time for the enormous backlog of club fixtures caused by the virus across the continent to be played. The play-off against Slovakia was subsequently postponed "until further notice", having previous been rescheduled for June 2020. This absence of fixtures led directly to the end of Mick McCarthy's time as national team manager, with the FAI announcing a surprise early beginning to the managerial tenure of Stephen Kenny—who had been lined up to succeed McCarthy in August following the completion of UEFA Euro 2020—on the night of 4 April.

On 17 April, the FAI announced it would be giving candidates for president and vice-president from 30 April until 25 July—the latter date being the previously scheduled election date—to confirm their nomination, as a result of the pandemic. After UEFA asked for confirmation that countries due to host UEFA Euro 2020 would host the rescheduled event the following year, Ireland reaffirmed its intention to do so.

League of Ireland clubs began to respond to the pandemic in mid-March. On the night of 15 March, Drogheda United sent a letter to all its staff and players informing them it would cease paying them. On 19 March, Sligo Rovers announced it would temporarily make all its staff and players redundant, having already assisted those from abroad in returning home. On 21 March, Cork City announced it would stop paying its players and staff. On 16 April, it was reported that players and staff at the Shamrock Rovers club had taken a 25% pay deduction. St Patrick's Athletic announced on 22 April that it had made all its playing and coaching staff temporarily redundant. Waterford players and management discovered on the evening of 4 May that were being made redundant on a temporary basis; manager Alan Reynolds criticised the manner of the disclosure; chairman Lee Power—also chairman of English fourth tier football club Swindon Town—had his son—the Waterford general manager—send an email; Reynolds only found out he had lost his job at his home club when his players informed him. On 15 May, the FAI announced "a pilot programme for a return to football for everyone" that would allow Bohemians, Derry City, Dundalk and Shamrock Rovers play each other in a (closed to spectators) mini tournament; the four teams were selected ahead of others as they had qualified for European competition and the event would serve as preparation.

On 2 July, the FAI announced the format for the league resumption later that month would involve a truncated season that would include 18 fixtures for each Premier Division club, a total that included games already played, and a plan of which Shamrock Rovers were the only club to approve.

The League of Ireland resumed after 146 days on 31 July, with the Premier Division's bottom club Sligo Rovers recording an away victory over Derry City in the first game played. The 4 August game between Sligo Rovers and Waterford was postponed after a Waterford player displayed symptoms; the game was rearranged for 18 August after he tested negative, while another player who displayed symptoms the next day also tested negative and the club's doctor resigned.

"We have different rules in Ireland than you have in the UK, they're much more stringent. They would be deemed close contacts to one of our non-footballing staff, but it was just very, very harsh that they were ruled out. They were perfectly fine, there's nothing wrong with them, but the the [sic] two-metre rule in Ireland... If they were in the UK, they would have been perfectly entitled to play, but Ireland has more stringent rules and we had to abide by the medical advice. We appealed it on the basis of 1.7m as opposed to 1.9m - that's how far they were away as opposed to 2m, which would have made them okay, but that wasn't deemed sufficient, so that's the way it goes. You can't do anything about that. The two lads are fine. They feel fine, they feel perfectly well".

— Manager Stephen Kenny, interviewed on English television on 8 October 2020, speaking about Adam Idah and Aaron Connolly's exclusion from the UEFA Euro 2020 play-off against Slovakia as a result of an FAI backroom team member testing positive for COVID-19.

UEFA's executive committee had confirmed on 17 June that the Republic of Ireland's UEFA Euro 2020 play-off against Slovakia in Bratislava would be played during the October international window. On 6 October, two days before that game, an FAI backroom team member tested positive for COVID-19; players and other personnel tested negative but two other staff who were close contacts of the confirmed case were forced to restrict their movements. The rest of the party received permission to travel to Bratislava. Shortly before the game was due to begin, the FAI announced that a second member of the backroom team had tested positive for COVID-19 in a test undertaken upon arrival in Bratislava the previous day. The announcement came after the team had been named, with Adam Idah and Aaron Connolly being excluded entirely from the game and Josh Cullen and Kevin Long replacing them on the bench. Slovakia won the game after a penalty shoot-out, eliminating their opponents from the tournament. It later emerged that Idah and Connolly had been excluded from the squad due to them being deemed close contacts of the second FAI backroom team member in which the virus had emerged and that an attempt to appeal the decision had not succeeded.

On 6 October, the League of Ireland's Galway United club announced that two of its players had tested positive for COVID-19 and the club's next fixture against Drogheda United was postponed; these were the first cases in the League of Ireland since the competition's resumption. On 7 October, St Patrick's Athletic announced a COVID-19 positive case and the club's next fixture against Dundalk was postponed. On 10 October, it was reported that the League of Ireland would extend its 2020 season by one week due to the recent COVID-19 cases having caused fixtures to be postponed.

On 11 October, the Republic of Ireland played Wales at home in the Group 4 of the 2020–21 UEFA Nations League B. On the morning of that game, it was announced that a player had tested positive for COVID-19, later revealed by his club Shamrock Rovers to be Jack Byrne, who (his club said) was at home. Byrne spent "several days" struggling to breathe as a result of his illness. His club manager Stephen Bradley said Byrne was "probably the worst" affected by the virus. As a result of being deemed close contacts of Byrne, four other players (Alan Browne, John Egan, Callum O'Dowda and Callum Robinson) were excluded from the squad on the morning of the Wales game. After the Wales game (a draw), Ireland's Health Service Executive (HSE) permitted Idah and Connolly to rejoin the squad when it emerged that the FAI backroom member's test result which had led to their exclusion had been a false positive.

Back in the League of Ireland, and on 15 October, the FAI postponed the next three fixtures involving Shamrock Rovers after forward Aaron Greene tested COVID-19 positive, in addition to Jack Byrne's positive test while on international duty. Also that day, Bohemians announced that "a first-team player" had contracted COVID-19 but the club proceeded with its fixture against Dundalk. Bohemians manager Keith Long criticised the absence of clarity on when a club ought to and when it ought not to postpone a game. On 16 October, Wexford announced that one of the club's players had tested positive for COVID-19, causing the postponement of that evening's First Division away game to Drogheda United. On 27 October, Derry City announced that it could not fulfil its final league fixture against Shamrock Rovers (one of that club's three fixtures to have been rescheduled) after two of the club's players tested positive for COVID-19; the FAI said it would refer the action to its disciplinary committee, having earlier promised clubs that no further fixtures would be postponed. The FAI decided not to punish Derry City, noting that "the decision of the Northern Ireland Public Health Agency to stand down their first team squad, left Derry City unable to fulfil the fixture", but, as a consequence, the entire final set of Premier Division fixtures was moved to the following Monday to accommodate the postponed game on the Saturday. Derry City's 2020 FAI Cup quarter-final against Sligo Rovers was also affected and postponed.

On 10 November, two days before the Republic of Ireland were due to play England in a friendly international at Wembley Stadium, the FAI announced that one player had tested positive for COVID-19 but was asymptomatic and that no one else had been deemed a close contact. Aaron Connolly, recalled along with Idah after being needlessly excluded from the squad ahead of the play-off in Bratislava the previous month, injured himself in training on the same day on this announcement and the player who had contracted COVID-19 was later revealed to be Callum Robinson, one of the players excluded from the Wales game after being deemed as a close contact of Jack Byrne. Robinson then tested negative for COVID-19 upon returning to his club West Bromwich Albion. Alan Browne played the entire game against England at Wembley, then tested positive for COVID-19 according to an FAI announcement the morning after. He later recovered.

Following the Republic of Ireland's away fixture against Wales in the 2020–21 UEFA Nations League B on 15 November, and also after playing the entire game, two players tested positive for COVID-19: Matt Doherty and James McClean. Both soon recovered. With 13 players unavailable (due to illness, injury or suspension) ahead of the home UEFA Nations League B game against Bulgaria, Shamrock Rovers players Graham Burke and Aaron McEneff, the then English second division player Troy Parrott and English third division player Jack Taylor, were all called up to the squad as replacements.

On 2 January 2021, the FAI and league representatives agreed to defer the start of the 2021 League of Ireland Premier Division season from 26 February until at least 19 March.

On 8 January, Idah (one of the internationals sidelined in Bratislava the previous October) was reported to be one of several cases of COVID-19 announced by his club Norwich City. On 12 January, Portsmouth announced that another Republic of Ireland international forward, Ronan Curtis, had tested positive for COVID-19.

On Wednesday 14 April, the FAI imposed its first sanction on a League of Ireland club for failing to fulfil a fixture as a result of COVID-19. Galway United, having already arrived in Dublin aboard two buses the previous Friday, were given a 3–0 victory after opponent Cabinteely cancelled the scheduled 2021 League of Ireland First Division game two hours in advance when a member of that squad tested positive for COVID-19.

On 23 April, UEFA stripped Dublin of its hosting duties at Euro 2020 after the Government and FAI could not confirm it would be able to have the Aviva Stadium at one quarter of capacity for each of its four scheduled games. UEFA did, however, honour its vow to gift €500,000 towards the redevelopment of Dalymount Park, the host city's tournament "legacy project".

On 10 May, Dundalk sent its players home from training and cancelled its training session scheduled for the following night after photographs appeared of players socialising in Belfast overnight in contravention of the inter-county travel ban then in force. Each player and member of the coaching staff was tested for COVID-19 as a consequence, with all results returned negative by the morning of 12 May. Manager Jim Magilton issued an apology to "the Dundalk FC fans, the FAI, the HSE and all frontline workers, the League of Ireland family and people everywhere", described the incident as "a misguided attempt at a team bonding exercise" and announced fines for the players, who were also forced to pay for the cost of the COVID-19 testing and required to donate towards the care of a former player with cancer. The FAI also investigated the incident.

A Waterford player tested positive for COVID-19 on 6 May, meaning the club had to play an under-19 team in a league game against Drogheda United, a game which ended in a 7–0 defeat, which equalled the record for the club's heaviest defeat in its history and resulted in the Premier Division's bottom club being four goals worse off than if they had conceded the game. Thus Waterford decided to gift their next opponents (Sligo Rovers) a walkover, which was recorded as a 3–0 loss for Waterford. A second Waterford player later tested positive for the virus after displaying symptoms.

On 7 July, Dundalk confirmed that several players had tested positive for COVID-19 ahead of the club's first qualifying round of the 2021–22 UEFA Europa Conference League game against Newtown.

On 25 August, West Bromwich Albion announced that Callum Robinson had tested positive for COVID-19 ahead of his club's 2021–22 EFL Cup second-round game against Arsenal. The positive test result, the second the club had announced for this player, also caused him to miss 2022 FIFA World Cup qualification – UEFA Group A fixtures for the national team. On 1 September, Shane Long tested positive for COVID-19 in Faro, Portugal, ahead of a World Cup qualification game against Portugal, a result that ruled him out of the match.

In October 2021, Callum Robinson stated ahead of the team's World Cup qualification away fixture against Azerbaijan that he had not been vaccinated against COVID-19. He was the first player to state he had not been vaccinated and, when reports followed of other players in the same position, manager Stephen Kenny (who stated it "wouldn't be too many more than [above ten unvaccinated players in his squad]") faced calls to exclude unvaccinated players from the team. However, the FAI issued a statement on the controversy, saying "we respect and must accept the right of all individuals to make a personal choice on COVID-19 vaccination.". Liveline presenter Joe Duffy stated that Robinson, who had twice tested positive for the virus and had scored one goal in his international career, has "had COVID more times than he's scored for Ireland". Robinson scored five goals in his next two games for the national team.

==== Other ====
FIBA—the international basketball federation—postponed the 2020 FIBA European Championship for Small Countries, which had been scheduled for the city of Limerick in June, though offered the rescheduled 2021 event if desired.

Irish players based in the Australian Football League (AFL), including Conor McKenna, returned home following the suspension of play there. In addition, the AFL announced on 5 April that they would not be travelling to Ireland for the planned International Rules Series in November 2020 due to the disruption that the virus had caused to their season.

On 11 May 2020, the Camanachd Association issued a statement that it had agreed in consultation with the GAA to cancel the 2020 Shinty-Hurling International Series between Ireland and Scotland, scheduled for October.

On 2 June, the Aer Lingus Classic college American football game between University of Notre Dame football and Navy Midshipmen football was moved to America from the Aviva Stadium on 29 August.

=== Non-ball sports ===
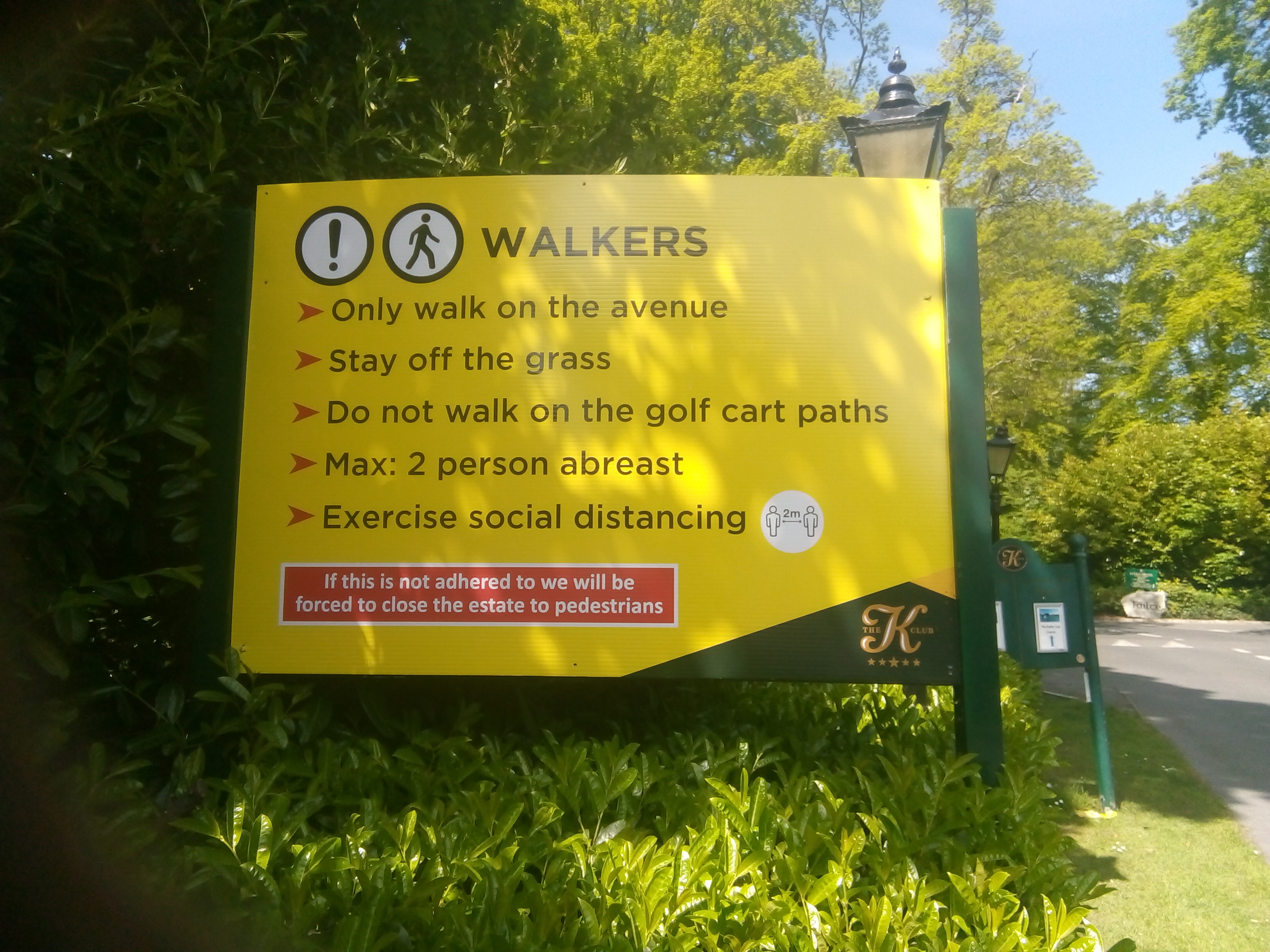
COVID-19 sign in Straffan, County Kildare in 2021

==== Horse racing ====
Many Irish horse racing enthusiasts travelled abroad for the 2020 Cheltenham Festival, held in an English town where the arrival of COVID-19 had just been confirmed. At least one Irishman, from the south, tested positive for COVID-19 after returning from Cheltenham. The National Public Health Emergency Team (NPHET) decided that people returning to Ireland did not need to self-isolate, not yet regarding Britain to be overrun by the virus to the same extent as Spain or Italy then were, though Minister for Foreign Affairs Simon Coveney admitted that—had the horse racing event been held in Ireland—the government would have called for its cancellation.

By mid-March 2020, Ireland had become the only major horse racing country in Europe where the sport continued, albeit strictly regulated and behind closed doors. All racing ceased following the measures introduced on 24 March which officially banned all sport, affecting the Irish Grand National which had been scheduled for mid-April.

On 1 April, the board of Horse Racing Ireland (HRI) announced the cancellation of the rest of the 2019–20 Irish National Hunt racing season, including its planned festivals at Fairyhouse and Punchestown.

On 20 April, the RDS announced that the Dublin Horse Show—scheduled for between 15 and 19 July—was cancelled, the first time this had occurred since 1940.

On 21 April, the Galway Race Committee announced that the 2020 Galway Races summer festival—scheduled for 27 July to 2 August—was cancelled and would be held behind closed doors for the first time since 1869. The Galway Races began its summer event behind closed doors on 27 July.

The 2021 Galway Races summer festival went ahead as planned on 26 July with a limit of 1,000 spectators a day, with the event strictly controlled in accordance with health and safety guidelines to prevent the spread of COVID-19.

==== Auto racing ====
On 12 March 2020, Motorsport Ireland decided that all events until 1 June would not go ahead.

Then on 8 April, the Donegal International Rally—the country's biggest event in the sport, scheduled for between 19 and 21 June—was postponed for only the second time in its history (it did not occur in 2001 due to restrictions imposed to successfully contain the foot-and-mouth outbreak in neighbouring Britain).

On the night of 5 May, Motorsport Ireland extended its suspension of activities until 20 July. On 19 May, Motorsport Ireland announced the cancellation of both the National Stages Rally Championship and the Irish Forest Rally Championship.

Meanwhile, on 28 April, the organisers of the Irish Tarmac Rally Championship announced that the 2020 championship was cancelled. Only round 1 of the championship, the Galway International Rally took place.

==== People racing ====
On 19 May 2020, it was announced that the 2020 Dublin Marathon—due to have been held on 25 October—was cancelled. On 7 July 2021, the 2021 Dublin Marathon—due to have been held on 24 October—was cancelled for the second year in a row.

==== Boxing ====
24 June 2020 brought the cancellation of a UFC event due to have taken place at the 3Arena in Dublin on 15 August.

==== Cycling ====
The 2020 Rás Tailteann—due to have taken place between 10 and 14 June—was not held for the second consecutive year due to the pandemic, with problems obtaining sponsorship having prevented it from being held in 2019. A women's race was also cancelled the day before it was due to start in Kilkenny due to the pandemic's impact on international travel.

The 2021 Rás Tailteann was also cancelled because of the pandemic.

==== Darts ====
The World Grand Prix, an annual event held in Dublin since 2000, could not be held in 2020 due to the Health Service Executive (HSE) holding Citywest.

==== Swimming ====
On 25 January 2021, Swim Ireland released a statement confirming the postponement of its McCullagh International meet scheduled for late February.

On 2 February, a round-Ireland charity finswim, which had been underway since 17 September, came to an end after 700 kilometres off the coast of County Waterford, due to logistical challenges and concerns over crew safety amid the escalation of the pandemic.

==== Walking ====
The January 2021 Ireland Lights Up recreational walking event was rescheduled for February.
