= Martin Rennie (footballer) =

Scottish footballer

Personal information
- Date of birth: 9 May 1994 (age 32)
- Place of birth: Kirkcaldy, Scotland
- Height: 1.84 m (6 ft 0 in)
- Position: Striker

Team information
- Current team: Forfar Athletic
- Number: 10

Youth career
- Inverkeithing Hillfield Swifts
- Kirkcaldy YM
- 2016–2018: Lochgelly Albert

Senior career*
Years	Team	Apps	(Gls)
2018–2020	Montrose	55	(18)
2020	St Patrick's Athletic	10	(0)
2020–2023	Montrose	19	(2)
2022	→ Berwick Rangers (loan)	3	(0)
2022	→ Broomhill (loan)	7	(2)
2023–2025	Clyde	75	(23)
2025–	Forfar Athletic	39	(11)
- * Club domestic league appearances and goals as of 09:32, 9 September 2026 (UTC)

Martin Rennie (born 9 May 1994) is a Scottish professional footballer who plays for Scottish League Two club Forfar Athletic. He previously played for Montrose over two spells either side of a season with St Patrick's Athletic in the League of Ireland Premier Division and a two-year stint with Clyde. He has also had loan spells at Berwick Rangers and Open Goal Broomhill.

== Club career ==
=== Early career ===
Rennie began playing his youth football with Inverkeithing Hillfield Swifts. From there he went on to play at amateur level for Kirkcaldy YM before signing for Lochgelly Albert in 2016.

=== Montrose ===
Having impressed at Junior level for Lochgelly Albert where he had scored 17 goals in half a season, Rennie was signed by Scottish League Two leaders Montrose on an 18-month contract on 19 January 2018. His first career goal at senior level came on 17 February 2018 in a 2–2 draw, scoring a 75th-minute equaliser just one minute after being substituted on. After scoring 4 goals in 11 games as Montrose became Scottish League Two champions and earning promotion to Scottish League One, Rennie signed a new 2-year contract with the club on 28 July 2018. He won Scottish League One Player of the Month for December 2018, with his manager Stewart Petrie receiving the Manager of the Month award. Rennie's first full season in senior football was a success on a personal level as he made 44 appearances in all competitions, scoring 14 goals and on 5 May 2019, he was named Montrose Young Player of the Year for the season. The 2019–20 season proved to be a quieter one for Rennie as by January he had made just 11 appearances and scoring 2 goals amidst transfer interest from other clubs.

=== St Patrick's Athletic ===
On 24 January 2020, it was announced that Rennie had signed for League of Ireland Premier Division side St Patrick's Athletic, whose assistant manager Pat Cregg recommended him to manager Stephen O'Donnell having been a teammate of Rennie's at Montrose until earlier in the season. The transfer cost the Dublin club a five figure sum, which saw Rennie become Montrose's first ever international transfer. Having joined the club in the middle of pre-season, he integrated into the team quickly, scoring his first goal in a 6–1 pre-season friendly win over Athlone Town on 29 January. He made his competitive debut on 14 February 2020, playing the full 90 minutes as his side lost 1–0 against Waterford in the opening game of the season at Richmond Park. After 11 appearances in all competitions without a goal, it was announced on 3 October 2020 that Rennie had left the club by mutual consent.

=== Return to Montrose ===
On 5 October 2020, it was announced that Rennie had returned to his old club Montrose on transfer deadline day. He made his first appearance since returning to the club 2 days later in a Scottish League Cup game with Scottish Premiership side Ross County, with Rennie missing a penalty in the shootout as Montrose lost after coming from 3–0 down to take the game to penalties. Rennie ended a streak of 30 appearances without a goal on 4 May 2021 when he opened the scoring in a 3–2 win over Partick Thistle for his first goal since December 2019. Rennie struggled with injury the following season but made his comeback in Montrose's 6-4 play-off final defeat; with Rennie scoring a goal in extra-time.

Rennie, in search of game time was sent out on loan to Berwick Rangers but was quickly recalled during parent club's Montrose injury crisis. On his first game back he scored in a 3–0 victory over Kelty Hearts. He was then sent out on loan to Open Goal Broomhill.

On 17 January 2023, Rennie was released by Montrose.

=== Clyde ===
On 18 January 2023, Rennie signed an 18-month contract with Scottish League One club Clyde.

=== Forfar Athletic ===
On 27 May 2025, Rennie signed a pre-contract agreement with Scottish League Two club Forfar Athletic on an initial one-year deal.

== Career statistics ==
As of match played on 8 September 2026

Appearances and goals by club, season and competition
Club	Season	League			National Cup		League Cup		Other		Total	
Club	Season	Division	Apps	Goals	Apps	Goals	Apps	Goals	Apps	Goals	Apps	Goals
Montrose	2017–18	Scottish League Two	11	4	0	0	0	0	0 (Note: Appearances in Scottish Challenge Cup)	0	11	4
Montrose	2018–19	Scottish League One	33	12	3	1	3	1	5 (Note: 3 appearances in Scottish Challenge Cup & 2 appearances in Scottish League One Playoffs)	0	44	14
Montrose	2019–20	Scottish League One	11	2	1	0	4	0	1	0	17	2
Montrose	Total		55	18	4	1	7	1	6	0	72	20
St Patrick's Athletic	2020	League of Ireland Premier Division	10	0	1	0	–		–		11	0
Montrose	2020–21	Scottish League One	13	1	1	0	4	0	2 (Note: Appearances in Scottish League One Playoffs)	0	20	1
Montrose	2021–22	Scottish League One	2	0	0	0	4	1	1	1	7	2
Montrose	2022–23	Scottish League One	4	1	0	0	4	0	1	0	9	1
Montrose	Total		19	2	1	0	12	1	4	1	36	4
Berwick Rangers (loan)	2022–23	Lowland Football League	3	0	–		–		–		3	0
Broomhill (loan)	2022–23	Lowland Football League	7	2	–		–		–		7	2
Clyde	2022–23	Scottish League One	15	2	–		–		1	1	16	3
Clyde	2023–24	Scottish League Two	30	12	3	1	4	1	0	0	37	14
Clyde	2024–25	Scottish League Two	30	9	1	0	4	1	1	0	36	10
Clyde	Total		75	23	4	1	8	2	2	1	89	27
Forfar Athletic	2025–26	Scottish League Two	33	11	2	0	4	1	8 (Note: 6 appearances, 3 goals in Scottish Challenge Cup; 2 appearances in 2026 Scottish League One Playoffs)	3	47	15
Forfar Athletic	2026–27	Scottish League Two	6	0	0	0	2	2	2	1	10	3
Forfar Athletic	Total		39	11	2	0	6	3	10	4	57	18
Career total			208	56	12	2	33	7	22	6	291	74

== Honours ==
=== Club ===
- Scottish League Two: (1)
  - Montrose — 2017–18

=== Individual ===
- Scottish League One Player of the Month: (1)
  - December 2018
- Montrose Young Player of the Year: (1)
  - 2018–19
- Scottish League Two Player of the Month: (1)
  - March 2025
