= Logan Ross =

Scottish footballer (born 2004)

Personal information
- Date of birth: 24 April 2004 (age 22)
- Position: Goalkeeper

Team information
- Current team: Inverness CT

Youth career
- –2020: Ross County

Senior career*
Years	Team	Apps	(Gls)
2020–2025	Ross County	0	(0)
2020–2021	→ Lossiemouth (loan)	3	(0)
2021-2022	→ Lossiemouth (loan)	26	(0)
2022-2023	→ Lossiemouth (loan)	18	(0)
2023	→ Brora Rangers (loan)	16	(0)
2023-2024	→ Brora Rangers (loan)	26	(0)
2024	→ Huntly (loan)	2	(0)
2024	→ Elgin City (loan)	0	(0)
2024	→ Forres Mechanics (loan)	2	(0)
2024	→ Nairn County (loan)	3	(0)
2024	→ Clachnacuddin (loan)	3	(0)
2025	→ Clachnacuddin (loan)	0	(0)
2025–	Inverness CT	0	(0)
- * Club domestic league appearances and goals as of 14 February 2025

Logan Ross (born 24 April 2004) is a Scottish professional footballer who plays as a goalkeeper for Inverness CT.

== Personal life ==
Ross has alopecia.

== Career ==
=== Ross County ===
Logan Ross signed his first professional contract with Ross County on 6 October 2020 aged 16 after coming up the ranks with the club youth, on 8 March 2022 Himself, Matthew Wright and Adam Mackinnon signed an extension until the end of 2023/24.

=== Loans ===
On 26 November 2020 Ross joined Highland Football League club Lossiemouth on a short loan until January.

On 24 July 2021 Logan Ross and Lossiemouth extended the loan deal before another extension until the end of the 22/23 season was cut short after being recalled in January 2023.

On 6 January 2023 Ross joined Highland Football League club Brora Rangers on a loan deal until the end of the season after being recalled mid-season from a loan in Lossiemouth.

On 14 August 2023 Ross headed back to Highland Football League club Brora Rangers on loan deal until the end of the 23/24 campaign, Ross played a crucial role in the Highland League Cup reaching the final, beating Fraserburgh 5-4 (on pens.).

On 2 February 2024 Ross returned to Ross County on an emergency basis to cover for Ross Laidlaw who picked up a calf injury, He was still eligible to switch between Ross County and Brora Rangers when needed.

Between 27 July 2024 and 12 December 2024, Ross joined Highland League clubs, Huntly, Forres Mechanics, Nairn County and Clachnacuddin along with League Two club, Elgin City on emergency agreement.

On 14 February 2025 Ross joined Clachnacuddin for a second time in the season on a loan until the end of the season.

=== Inverness CT ===
On 16 June 2025 Ross signed for Scottish League One club Inverness CT on a one year deal.

== Honours ==
Brora Rangers

- Highland League Cup: 2023-24
