= 2019–20 Leinster Senior Cup =

2020 Leinster Senior Cup
Leinster Football Association Senior Cup

Tournament details
- Country: Ireland

Final positions
- Champions: Abandoned

The 2020 Leinster Senior Cup was scheduled to be the 119th staging of the Leinster Football Association's primary competition. It was abandoned after two rounds due to the Coronavirus pandemic. It was scheduled to include all Leinster based League of Ireland clubs from the Premier Division and First Division, as well as a selection of intermediate level sides.

== Teams ==
Premier Division	First Division	LSL	Other Leagues	Other Leagues
Bohemians; Dundalk; Shamrock Rovers; Shelbourne; St Patrick's Athletic	Athlone Town; Bray Wanderers; Cabinteely; Drogheda United; Longford Town; UCD; Wexford	Ayrfield United; Bluebell United; Crumlin United; Killester Donnycarney; Malahide United; Sheriff YC; St Mochta’s	AUL: Clontarf; Wexford Football League: Moyne Rangers; Carlow & District Football League: New Oak Boys; Crettyard United; Kilkenny & District Soccer League: Evergreen; Wicklow & District Football League: Newtown United	Meath and District League: Boyne Harps; United Churches Football League: VEC F.C.; Combined Counties Football League: Willow Park; Kildare & District Football League: Monread

== Preliminary round ==
The draw for the Preliminary and First Rounds was announced on 10 September 2019.

27 October 2019	Boyne Harps	2–0	Newtown United	Drogheda
14:00 GMT	Robert Cashman 65'; Dale Harding 80'			Stadium: United Park

24 November 2019	Monread	W/O	Willow Park	Naas
11:00 GMT				Stadium: Monread Park

== First round ==
11 October 2019	Clontarf	1–1 (a.e.t.) (2–1 p)	VEC	Clonshaugh, Dublin
19:30 GMT	David Vos 45'		Joey Byrne 56'	Stadium: AUL Complex
	Penalties
	Gary Murray (penalty scored); Declan Donnery (penalty scored)

13 October 2019	Evergreen	5–2	Moyne Rangers	Kilkenny City
11:00 GMT	Sean Barcoe 67', 73', 76', 90'; Jamie Owens 84' (pen.)		James Peare 68'; Colin Henderson 85'	Stadium: Evergreen Park

24 November 2019	New Oak Boys	2–0	Boyne Harps	Carlow Town
13:30 GMT	Daryl Coleman 12'; Conor Byrne 47'			Stadium: Burrin Road

5 January 2020	Willow Park	1–1 (a.e.t.) (3–4 p)	Ayrfield United	Athlone
14:00 GMT	Stephen Mullen 118'		Alex Barry 110'	Stadium: DPD Park
	Penalties
	Penalty scored Penalty missed		(penalty scored) Reece Higgins; (penalty scored) Dillyn Byrne; (penalty scored) Conor Young (penalty missed); (penalty scored) Alan Connors

== Second round ==
The draw for the Second Round was shared by Striker Online on 11 December 2019.

26 January 2020	Crettyard United	1–1 (a.e.t.) (3–5 p)	New Oak Boys	Crettyard
11:00 GMT	Robert Dowling 40'		Cian Dowling 83'	Stadium: Killeen Road

26 January 2020	Evergreen	1–2	Ayrfield United	Kilkenny City
14:00 GMT	Chris Whearty 71'		Alan Connor 75'; Brian Malone 90+4'	Stadium: Evergreen Park

1 March 2020	Clontarf	1–2 (a.e.t.)	Sheriff YC	Clonshaugh, Dublin
11:00 GMT	David Vos 81'		Evan Pierce 19'; Mark Quigley 101'	Stadium: AUL Complex

== Third round ==
The draw for the Third Round was announced by the Leinster Football Association on 27 January 2020. All football activity in the Republic of Ireland was halted in March due to the Coronavirus pandemic. No revised dates were announced for planned fixtures and the competition went on hiatus until 2022.

	Sheriff YC	A-A	Crumlin United	Fairview, Dublin
GMT				Stadium: Fairview Park

	Killester Donnycarney	A-A	New Oak Boys	Killester
GMT				Stadium: Hadden Park

	Ayrfield United	A-A	Bluebell United	Ayrfield, Dublin
GMT				Stadium: Blunden Drive

	Malahide United	A-A	St Mochta’s	Malahide, Dublin
GMT				Stadium: Gannon Park
