= 2021 St Patrick's Athletic F.C. season =

St Patrick's Athletic F.C.
2021 season
- Chairman: Garrett Kelleher
- Coach: Stephen O'Donnell
- Stadium: Richmond Park, Inchicore, Dublin 8
- League of Ireland Premier Division: 2nd
- FAI Cup: Champions
- Top goalscorer: League: Matty Smith – 11 goals All: Matty Smith – 12 goals
- Highest home attendance: 5,000 vs Dundalk (22 October)
- Lowest home attendance: 0 - First 7 home fixtures
Home colours	Away colours

The 2021 season was St Patrick's Athletic F.C.'s 92nd year in existence and is the Supersaint's 70th consecutive season in the top-flight of Irish football. It was the second full season with Stephen O'Donnell as manager, having taken over from Harry Kenny on 31 August 2019. Pre-season training for the squad began on 1 February 2021, the same day the league fixtures were announced, with the Saints revealed to be playing rivals Shamrock Rovers away in the opening game of the season on 19 March. The 2021 editions of the League of Ireland Cup and the Leinster Senior Cup were cancelled due to the delay in the start to the 2021 League of Ireland Premier Division as a result of the COVID-19 pandemic. The season was a hugely successful one for the club, as they secured a 2nd-place finish, securing UEFA Europa Conference League football for 2022, as well as winning the 2021 FAI Cup in front of an Aviva Stadium FAI Cup Final record crowd of 37,126.

== Squad ==
No.	Name	Position(s)	Nationality	Hometown	Date of birth (age)	Previous club	Year signed	Club apps.	Club goals
Goalkeepers
1	Vítězslav Jaroš	GK	(Czech Republic)	Příbram, Central Bohemian Region	23 July 2001 (age 25)	(England) Liverpool	2021	39	0
21	Barry Murphy	GK	(Republic of Ireland)	Tallaght, Dublin	8 June 1985 (age 41)	Free agent	2021	59	0
25	Josh Keeley	GK	(Republic of Ireland)	Dunboyne, County Meath	17 May 2003 (age 23)	(Republic of Ireland) St Patrick's Athletic Academy	2020	2	0
Defenders
2	John Mountney	RB/RW	(Republic of Ireland)	Bohola, County Mayo	22 February 1993 (age 33)	(Republic of Ireland) Dundalk	2021	21	1
3	Ian Bermingham (Captain)	LB/CB	(Republic of Ireland)	Ballyfermot, Dublin	16 June 1989 (age 37)	(Republic of Ireland) Shamrock Rovers	2010	442	16
4	Sam Bone	CB/RB	(England)	Maidstone, Kent	6 February 1998 (age 28)	(Republic of Ireland) Waterford	2021	35	2
5	Lee Desmond	CB/CDM	(Republic of Ireland)	Donaghmede, Dublin	22 January 1995 (age 31)	(Republic of Ireland) Shelbourne	2015	226	2
20	Shane Griffin	LB/CB	(Republic of Ireland)	Carrigaline, County Cork	8 September 1994 (age 32)	(Republic of Ireland) Cork City	2020	29	0
22	Jak Hickman	RB	(England)	Sandwell, West Midlands	11 September 1998 (age 28)	(England) Bolton Wanderers	2021	11	0
28	Cian Kelly	CB	(Republic of Ireland)	Tallaght, Dublin	4 March 2002 (age 24)	(Republic of Ireland) St Patrick's Athletic Academy	2019	1	0
29	Paddy Barrett	CB	(Republic of Ireland)	Waterford	23 July 1993 (age 33)	(Cambodia) Preah Khan Reach Svay Rieng	2021	32	1
39	James Abankwah	CB	(Republic of Ireland)	Waterford	16 January 2004 (age 22)	(Republic of Ireland) St Patrick's Athletic Academy	2021	13	0
41	Sam Curtis	CB	(Republic of Ireland)	Navan, County Meath	1 December 2005 (age 20)	(Republic of Ireland) St Patrick's Athletic Academy	2021	1	0
Midfielders
6	Jamie Lennon	CDM/CM	(Republic of Ireland)	Santry, Dublin	9 May 1998 (age 28)	(Republic of Ireland) St Patrick's Athletic Academy	2017	119	1
7	Robbie Benson	CAM/CM	(Republic of Ireland)	Athlone, County Westmeath	7 May 1992 (age 34)	(Republic of Ireland) Dundalk	2020	43	7
8	Chris Forrester	CM/CAM	(Republic of Ireland)	Smithfield, Dublin	17 December 1992 (age 33)	(Scotland) Aberdeen	2019	249	57
11	Jason McClelland	LW/LB	(Republic of Ireland)	Templeogue, Dublin	5 March 1997 (age 29)	(Republic of Ireland) UCD	2020	44	3
12	Matty Smith	LW/ST	(Scotland)	Dundee, Dundee City	13 March 1997 (age 29)	(Republic of Ireland) Waterford	2021	36	12
15	Billy King	LW/RW/CAM	(Scotland)	Portobello, City of Edinburgh	12 May 1994 (age 32)	(Scotland) Greenock Morton	2020	55	11
16	Alfie Lewis	CM/CDM	(England)	Leigh-on-Sea, Essex	28 September 1999 (age 27)	(England) West Ham United	2021	36	3
17	Darragh Burns	RW	(Republic of Ireland)	Stamullen, County Meath	8 June 2002 (age 24)	(Republic of Ireland) St Patrick's Athletic Academy	2019	36	7
18	Ben McCormack	CAM	(Republic of Ireland)	Harmonstown, Dublin	4 April 2003 (age 23)	(Republic of Ireland) St Patrick's Athletic Academy	2019	29	1
27	Danny Norris	LW	(Republic of Ireland)	Leixlip, County Kildare	17 February 2003 (age 23)	(Republic of Ireland) St Patrick's Athletic Academy	2021	0	0
31	Kian Corbally	CM	(Republic of Ireland)	Palmerstown, Dublin	31 December 2003 (age 22)	(Republic of Ireland) St Patrick's Athletic Academy	2019	4	1
34	Adam Murphy	CM	(Republic of Ireland)	Donnycarney, Dublin	8 April 2005 (age 21)	(Republic of Ireland) St Patrick's Athletic Academy	2021	0	0
40	Ross Fay	CM	(Republic of Ireland)	East Wall, Dublin	22 January 2003 (age 23)	(Republic of Ireland) St Patrick's Athletic Academy	2021	0	0
Forwards
9	Kyrian Nwoko	ST	(Malta)	Valletta, Malta	4 July 1997 (age 29)	(Malta) Valletta	2021	9	0
10	Ronan Coughlan	ST	(Republic of Ireland)	Limerick	2 October 1996 (age 30)	(Republic of Ireland) Sligo Rovers	2021	32	8
19	Nahum Melvin-Lambert	ST	(Saint Lucia)	(England) Hackney, London	21 October 2002 (age 24)	(England) Reading	2021	17	3
33	Kyle Robinson	ST	(Republic of Ireland)	Lucan, County Dublin	8 November 2002 (age 24)	(Republic of Ireland) St Patrick's Athletic Academy	2019	3	2
38	Tommy Lonergan	ST	(Republic of Ireland)	Dunboyne, County Meath	2 January 2004 (age 22)	(Republic of Ireland) St Patrick's Athletic Academy	2021	1	0

=== Transfers ===
==== Transfers in ====
Date	Position	Nationality	Name	From	Fee	Ref.
22 December 2020	ST	(Republic of Ireland)	Ronan Coughlan	(Republic of Ireland) Sligo Rovers	Free transfer	
7 January 2021	RB	(Republic of Ireland)	John Mountney	(Republic of Ireland) Dundalk	Free transfer	
12 January 2021	RB	(England)	Sam Bone	(Republic of Ireland) Waterford	Free transfer	
13 January 2021	LW	(Scotland)	Matty Smith	(Republic of Ireland) Waterford	Free transfer	
3 February 2021	GK	(Czech Republic)	Vítězslav Jaroš	(England) Liverpool	Loan	
23 February 2021	CM	(England)	Alfie Lewis	(England) West Ham United	Loan	
23 February 2021	CB	(Republic of Ireland)	Paddy Barrett	(Cambodia) Preah Khan Reach Svay Rieng	Free transfer	
25 February 2021	ST	(England)	Nahum Melvin-Lambert	(England) Reading	Loan	
11 March 2021	GK	(Republic of Ireland)	Barry Murphy	Free agent	Free transfer	
1 July 2021	CM	(England)	Alfie Lewis	(England) West Ham United	Free transfer	
25 July 2021	CB	(Republic of Ireland)	Sam Curtis	(Republic of Ireland) Shamrock Rovers	Free transfer	
28 July 2021	ST	(England)	Nahum Melvin-Lambert	(England) Reading	Loan	
28 July 2021	ST	(Malta)	Kyrian Nwoko	(Malta) Valletta	Loan	
19 August 2021	RB	(England)	Jak Hickman	(England) Bolton Wanderers	Free transfer	

==== Transfers out ====
Date	Position	Nationality	Name	To	Fee	Ref.
10 November 2020	RB	(Republic of Ireland)	Simon Madden	Retired	Released	
10 November 2020	RB	(Latvia)	David Titov	Unattached	Released	
10 November 2020	ST	(Republic of Ireland)	Georgie Kelly	(Republic of Ireland) Dundalk	End of loan	
26 November 2020	GK	(Republic of Ireland)	Brendan Clarke	(Republic of Ireland) Shelbourne	Free transfer	
29 November 2020	CAM	(Republic of Ireland)	Darragh Markey	(Republic of Ireland) Drogheda United	Free Transfer	
22 December 2020	RB	(Republic of Ireland)	Paul Cleary	(Republic of Ireland) Wexford	Free transfer	
22 December 2020	RW	(Republic of Ireland)	James Doona	(Republic of Ireland) Athlone Town	Free transfer	
4 January 2021	RW	(England)	Jordan Gibson	(Republic of Ireland) Sligo Rovers	Free transfer	
5 January 2021	RB	(Republic of Ireland)	Rory Feely	(Republic of Ireland) Bohemians	Free transfer	
23 January 2021	GK	(Republic of Ireland)	Conor Kearns	(Republic of Ireland) Galway United	Free transfer	
29 January 2021	CB	(Republic of Ireland)	Luke McNally	(England) Oxford United	Undisclosed fee	
26 February 2021	ST	(Republic of Ireland)	Kyle Robinson	(Republic of Ireland) Wexford	Loan	
1 June 2021	ST	(England)	Nahum Melvin-Lambert	(England) Reading	End of loan	
26 June 2021	CM	(England)	Alfie Lewis	(England) West Ham United	End of loan	
1 July 2021	CB	(Republic of Ireland)	Cian Kelly	(Republic of Ireland) Wexford	Loan	
1 July 2021	ST	(Republic of Ireland)	Kyle Robinson	(Republic of Ireland) Wexford	Loan extended	
9 July 2021	CM	(Republic of Ireland)	Glory Nzingo	(France) Stade de Reims	Undisclosed fee	
1 August 2021	LW	(Republic of Ireland)	Danny Norris	(Republic of Ireland) UCD	Free transfer	

=== Squad statistics ===
==== Appearances, goals and cards ====
Number in brackets represents (appearances of which were substituted ON). Last updated – 29 November 2021

No.	Player	SSE Airtricity League		FAI Cup		Total	
No.	Player	Apps	Goals	Apps	Goals	Apps	Goals
1	Vítězslav Jaroš	34	0	5	0	39	0
2	John Mountney	20(2)	1	1(1)	0	21(3)	1
3	Ian Bermingham	29(7)	1	5	0	34(7)	1
4	Sam Bone	32(3)	1	3	1	35(3)	2
5	Lee Desmond	30(2)	1	3	0	33(2)	1
6	Jamie Lennon	28(6)	0	5	0	33(6)	0
7	Robbie Benson	24(4)	5	2(1)	0	26(5)	5
8	Chris Forrester	35(2)	8	4	2	39(2)	10
9	Kyrian Nwoko	8(6)	0	1(1)	0	9(7)	0
10	Ronan Coughlan	28(7)	7	4(2)	1	32(9)	8
11	Jason McClelland	24(11)	2	4(2)	1	28(13)	3
12	Matty Smith	33(2)	11	3	1	36(2)	12
15	Billy King	36(9)	7	5(1)	3	41(10)	10
16	Alfie Lewis	31(6)	3	5(1)	0	36(7)	3
17	Darragh Burns	26(10)	4	4	3	30(10)	7
18	Ben McCormack	23(18)	0	3(1)	1	26(19)	1
19	Nahum Melvin-Lambert	16(12)	3	1(1)	0	17(13)	3
20	Shane Griffin	14(3)	0	2(2)	0	16(5)	0
21	Barry Murphy	1	0	0	0	1	0
22	Jak Hickman	7(3)	0	4(2)	0	11(5)	0
25	Josh Keeley	1	0	1(1)	0	2(1)	0
29	Paddy Barrett	28(4)	0	4	1	32(4)	1
31	Kian Corbally	1(1)	0	1(1)	0	2(2)	0
34	Adam Murphy	0	0	0	0	0	0
38	Tommy Lonergan	0	0	1(1)	0	1(1)	0
39	James Abankwah	9(3)	0	4(2)	0	13(5)	0
40	Ross Fay	0	0	0	0	0	0
41	Sam Curtis	1(1)	0	0	0	1(1)	0
Players out on loan
28	Cian Kelly	0	0	0	0	0	0
33	Kyle Robinson	0	0	0	0	0	0
Players that left during the season
27	Danny Norris	0	0	0	0	0	0

==== Top scorers ====
Includes all competitive matches. Last updated 29 November 2021

Number	Name	SSE Airtricity League	FAI Cup	Total
12	Matty Smith	11	1	12
8	Chris Forrester	8	2	10
15	Billy King	7	3	10
10	Ronan Coughlan	7	1	8
17	Darragh Burns	4	3	7
7	Robbie Benson	5	0	5
11	Jason McClelland	2	1	3
16	Alfie Lewis	3	0	3
9	Nahum Melvin-Lambert	3	0	3
4	Sam Bone	1	1	2
2	John Mountney	1	0	1
29	Paddy Barrett	0	1	1
18	Ben McCormack	0	1	1
5	Lee Desmond	1	0	1
3	Ian Bermingham	1	0	1
N/A	Own Goal	1	0	1

==== Top assists ====
Includes all competitive matches. Last updated 29 November 2021

Number	Name	SSE Airtricity League	FAI Cup	Total
17	Darragh Burns	11	1	12
10	Ronan Coughlan	6	1	7
7	Robbie Benson	6	0	6
19	Chris Forrester	4	2	6
18	Ben McCormack	3	2	5
15	Billy King	0	3	3
6	Jamie Lennon	2	1	3
12	Matty Smith	3	0	3
22	Jak Hickman	2	0	2
3	Ian Bermingham	1	1	2
2	John Mountney	2	0	2
9	Nahum Melvin-Lambert	1	0	1
11	Jason McClelland	0	1	1
16	Alfie Lewis	1	0	1
4	Sam Bone	1	0	1

==== Top clean sheets ====
Includes all competitive matches. Last updated 29 November 2021

Position	Number	Name	SSE Airtricity League	FAI Cup	Total
GK	1	Vítězslav Jaroš	11/34	2/5	13/39
GK	21	Barry Murphy	0/1	0/0	0/1
GK	25	Josh Keeley	0/1	1/1	1/2

==== Disciplinary record ====
Last updated 29 November 2021

Number	Name	SSE Airtricity League		FAI Cup		Total	
Number	Name	Yellow card	Red card	Yellow card	Red card	Yellow card	Red card
6	Jamie Lennon	9	1	2	0	11	1
12	Matty Smith	10	0	0	0	10	0
4	Sam Bone	8	0	1	1	9	1
5	Lee Desmond	7	1	1	0	8	1
3	Ian Bermingham	6	1	1	0	7	1
29	Paddy Barrett	6	0	2	0	8	0
19	Chris Forrester	6	0	0	0	6	0
17	Darragh Burns	3	0	1	0	4	0
39	James Abankwah	3	0	1	0	4	0
18	Ben McCormack	4	0	0	0	4	0
15	Billy King	3	0	0	0	3	0
12	Alfie Lewis	2	1	0	0	2	1
10	Ronan Coughlan	1	1	0	0	1	1
22	Jak Hickman	2	0	0	0	2	0
20	Shane Griffin	2	0	0	0	2	0
7	Robbie Benson	2	0	0	0	2	0
2	John Mountney	2	0	0	0	2	0
19	Nahum Melvin-Lambert	1	0	0	0	1	0
1	Vítězslav Jaroš	1	0	0	0	1	0
11	Jason McClelland	1	0	0	0	1	0
Totals		79	5	9	1	88	6

==== Captains ====
No.	P	Name	Country	No. games	Notes
3	DF	Ian Bermingham	(Republic of Ireland)	27	Captain
7	DF	Robbie Benson	(Republic of Ireland)	10	Vice-captain
8	DF	Chris Forrester	(Republic of Ireland)	4	

Last updated: 29 November 2021
Source: Competitive match reports.
Competitive matches only
Matches started as captain only
Country: FIFA nationality; No.: Squad number; P: Position; Name: Player name; No. Games: Number of games started as captain.

== Club ==
=== Coaching staff ===
- Head coach: Stephen O'Donnell
- Assistant manager: Pat Cregg
- First-team coach: Alan Mathews
- Director of Football: Ger O'Brien
- Coach: Seán O'Connor
- Opposition Analyst: Martin Doyle
- Goalkeeping coach: Pat Jennings
- Strength and Conditioning Coach: Chris Coburn
- Physiotherapist: Mark Kenneally
- Physiotherapist: Lee Van Haeften
- Physiotherapist: Christy O'Neill
- Club Doctor: Dr Matt Corcoran
- Equipment Manager: David McGill
- Under 19s Head Coach: Seán O'Connor
- Under 19s Coach: Niall Cully
- Under 19s Coach: John Donohue
- Under 17s Head Coach: Marc Kenny
- Under 17s Coach: Paul Webb
- Under 17s Coach: Sean Gahan
- Under 15s Head Coach: Seán O'Connor
- Under 15s Coach: Daniel McGuinness
- Under 15s Coach: Billy Smith
- Under 13s Head Coach: Mark Connolly
- Under 13s Coach: Phil Power
- Under 13s Coach: Craig Dempsey

=== Kit ===
Supplier: Umbro
Sponsor(s): MIG Insurance Brokers (Front of Jersey)
Manguard Plus (Back of Jersey - Top)
Clune Construction Company (Back of Jersey - Bottom)
Bill Griffin Motors (Sleeves of Jersey)
Flomax (Shorts - Front)
U Store It (Shorts - Back)

Home	Away	Pre-season Home	Pre-season Away

The club released new Home & Away kits for the season.

Type	Shirt	Shorts	Socks	Info
Home	Red/White Shoulders	White	Red	Worn 27 times; against Shamrock Rovers (LOI) (A), Drogheda United (LOI) (H), Derry City (LOI) (H), Waterford (LOI) (H), Finn Harps (LOI) (A), Longford Town (LOI) (H), Shamrock Rovers (LOI) (H), Bohemians (LOI) (H), Dundalk (LOI) (H), Finn Harps (LOI) (H), Waterford (LOI) (A), Derry City (LOI) (H), Drogheda United (LOI) (H), Bray Wanderers (FAI) (H), Shamrock Rovers (LOI) (A), Waterford (LOI) (H), Finn Harps (LOI) (A), Cork City (FAI) (A), Longford Town (LOI) (H), Wexford (FAI) (H), Shamrock Rovers (LOI) (H), Drogheda United (LOI) (A), Dundalk (FAI) (H), Dundalk (LOI) (H), Bohemians (LOI) (H), Finn Harps (LOI) (H), Waterford (LOI) (A)
Away	Navy/Red Trim	Navy	Navy	Worn 14 times; against Bohemians (LOI) (A), Dundalk (LOI) (A), Sligo Rovers (LOI) (A), Drogheda United (LOI) (A), Derry City (LOI) (A), Longford Town (LOI) (A), Sligo Rovers (LOI) (H), Bohemians (LOI) (A), Dundalk (LOI) (A), Sligo Rovers (LOI) (A), Derry City (LOI) (A), Longford Town (LOI) (A), Sligo Rovers (LOI) (H), Bohemians (FAI) (N)
Pre-season Home	Red/White Sleeves	White	Red	Worn 3 times; against Wexford (FRN) (H), Cobh Ramblers (FRN) (N), UCD (A)
Pre-season Away	White	White	White	Worn 1 time; against Cork City (FRN) (N)

Key:
LOI=League of Ireland Premier Division
FAI=FAI Cup
FRN=Friendly

== Competitions ==
=== League of Ireland ===
==== League table ====
Pos	Team	Pld	W	D	L	GF	GA	GD	Pts	Qualification or relegation
1	Shamrock Rovers (C)	36	24	6	6	59	28	+31	78	Qualification for Champions League first qualifying round
2	St Patrick's Athletic	36	18	8	10	56	42	+14	62	Qualification for Europa Conference League second qualifying round (Note: Since the winners of the 2021 FAI Cup (St Patrick's Athletic) qualified for European competition based on their league position, the final spot awarded to the Cup winner passed to the next best-placed team, i.e. fourth-placed team.)
3	Sligo Rovers	36	16	9	11	43	32	+11	57	Qualification for Europa Conference League first qualifying round
4	Derry City	36	14	12	10	49	42	+7	54	Qualification for Europa Conference League first qualifying round
5	Bohemians	36	14	10	12	60	46	+14	52	
6	Dundalk	36	13	9	14	44	46	−2	48	
7	Drogheda United	36	12	8	16	45	43	+2	44	
8	Finn Harps	36	11	11	14	44	52	−8	44	
9	Waterford (R)	36	12	6	18	36	56	−20	42	Qualification for relegation play-offs
10	Longford Town (R)	36	2	9	25	22	71	−49	15	Relegation to League of Ireland First Division

Source: SSE Airtricity League, Soccerway
Rules for classification: 1) Points; 2) Goal difference; 3) Goals scored.
(C) Champions; (R) Relegated

==== Results summary ====
Overall								Home						Away					
Pld	W	D	L	GF	GA	GD	Pts	W	D	L	GF	GA	GD	W	D	L	GF	GA	GD
36	18	8	10	56	42	+14	62	12	2	4	30	18	+12	6	6	6	26	24	+2

Last updated: 22 November 2021.

==== Results by round ====
Round	1	2	3	4	5	6	7	8	9	10	11	12	13	14	15	16	17	18	19	20	21	22	23	24	25	26	27	28	29	30	31	32	33	34	35	36
Ground	A	H	A	H	A	H	A	H	A	H	A	H	A	H	A	H	H	A	A	H	H	A	A	H	A	H	A	H	A	A	H	A	H	H	H	A
Result	D	W	W	W	D	W	W	W	D	L	L	W	D	L	W	W	W	D	L	W	W	L	W	W	L	W	L	L	W	L	W	W	D	L	D	D
Position	4	3	1	1	2	3	1	1	2	2	2	3	3	3	3	2	1	1	3	3	2	2	2	2	2	2	2	2	2	2	2	2	2	2	2	2

Updated to match(es) played on 22 November 2021. Source: 2021 League of Ireland Premier Division
A = Away; H = Home; W = Win; D = Draw; L = Loss

==== Matches ====
Win Draw Loss

19 March 2021 1	Shamrock Rovers	1–1	St Patrick's Athletic	Tallaght, Dublin 24
19:45 GMT	Sean Gannon (yellow card) 5'; Aaron Greene 89'	Report	Ronan Coughlan (yellow card) 18'; Lee Desmond (yellow card) 43'; Shane Griffin (yellow card) 61'; Roberto Lopes 87' (o.g.)	Stadium: Tallaght Stadium; Attendance: 0 Referee: Rob Hennessy
Note: Played behind closed doors due to COVID-19 restrictions Live on RTÉ Two

27 March 2021 2	St Patrick's Athletic	2–1	Drogheda United	Inchicore, Dublin 8
16:00 GMT	Jamie Lennon (yellow card) 22'; Ronan Coughlan 60'; Robbie Benson (yellow card) 70'; Lee Desmond (yellow card) 82'; Billy King 90+1'	Report	Gary Deegan (yellow card) 21'; Chris Lyons (yellow card) 21'; Dinny Corcoran 69'	Stadium: Richmond Park; Attendance: 0 Referee: John McLouglin
Note: Played behind closed doors due to COVID-19 restrictions Live on WatchLOI

3 April 2021 3	Bohemians	0–1	St Patrick's Athletic	Phibsborough, Dublin 7
18:00 GMT	Anthony Breslin (yellow card) 54'; Georgie Kelly (yellow card) 87'	Report	Sam Bone (yellow card) 57'; Ronan Coughlan 62'	Stadium: Dalymount Park; Attendance: 0 Referee: Neil Doyle
Note: Played behind closed doors due to COVID-19 restrictions Live on WatchLOI

9 April 2021 4	St Patrick's Athletic	2–0	Derry City	Inchicore, Dublin 8
17:45 GMT	Matty Smith (yellow card) 56'; Robbie Benson 60'; Darragh Burns 71'	Report	Danny Lupano (yellow card) 11'; Danny Lupano (yellow card) 32' (yellow-red card)	Stadium: Richmond Park; Attendance: 0 Referee: Ben Connolly
Note: Played behind closed doors due to COVID-19 restrictions

17 April 2021 5	Dundalk	1–1	St Patrick's Athletic	Dundalk, County Louth
18:00 GMT	Junior Ogedi-Uzokwe 85'	Report	Sam Bone (yellow card) 40'; Sam Bone 56'; Jamie Lennon (yellow card) 77'; Chris Forrester (yellow card) 83'	Stadium: Oriel Park; Attendance: 0 Referee: Damien McGrath
Note: Played behind closed doors due to COVID-19 restrictions Live on WatchLOI

20 April 2021 6	St Patrick's Athletic	1–0	Waterford	Inchicore, Dublin 8
19:45 GMT	Darragh Burns 2'	Report	John Martin (yellow card) 33'; Niall O'Keefe (yellow card) 48'; Jamie Mascoll (yellow card) 53'; Prince Mutswunguma (yellow card) 67'; James Waite (yellow card) 83'; Tunmise Sobowale (yellow card) 90'	Stadium: Richmond Park; Attendance: 0 Referee: Graham Kelly

23 April 2021 7	Finn Harps	0–2	St Patrick's Athletic	Ballybofey, County Donegal
17:45 GMT	Ryan Rainey (yellow card) 88'; Will Seymore (yellow card) 90+4'	Report	Billy King 15'; Matty Smith 61'	Stadium: Finn Park; Attendance: 0 Referee: Rob Harvey
Note: Played behind closed doors due to COVID-19 restrictions Live on WatchLOI

30 April 2021 8	St Patrick's Athletic	3–0	Longford Town	Inchicore, Dublin 8
17:45 GMT	Sam Bone (yellow card) 44'; Ronan Coughlan 47'; Chris Forrester 52'; Lee Desmond (yellow card) 66'; Matty Smith (yellow card) 83'; Chris Forrester 90+1'	Report	Aaron Bolger (yellow card) 65'; Joe Manley (yellow card) 86'	Stadium: Richmond Park; Attendance: 0 Referee: Ray Matthews
Note: Played behind closed doors due to COVID-19 restrictions Live on WatchLOI

3 May 2021 9	Sligo Rovers	1–1	St Patrick's Athletic	Sligo, County Sligo
17:45 GMT	Jordan Gibson 49' (pen.); Greg Bolger (yellow card) 56'; Jordan Gibson (yellow card) 58'; Garry Buckley (yellow card) 72'	Report	Lee Desmond (yellow card) 2'; Jamie Lennon (yellow card) 58'; Ian Bermingham 90+5'	Stadium: The Showgrounds; Attendance: 0 Referee: Neil Doyle
Note: Played behind closed doors due to COVID-19 restrictions Live on WatchLOI

8 May 2021 10	St Patrick's Athletic	1–2	Shamrock Rovers	Inchicore, Dublin 8
18:00 GMT	Chris Forrester 5'; Jamie Lennon (yellow card) 35'; Matty Smith (yellow card) 86'	Report	Liam Scales (yellow card) 35'; Graham Burke 41'; Graham Burke (yellow card) 42'; Danny Mandroiu 90+2'	Stadium: Richmond Park; Attendance: 0 Referee: Ray Matthews
Note: Played behind closed doors due to COVID-19 restrictions Live on WatchLOI

14 May 2021 11	Drogheda United	3–1	St Patrick's Athletic	Drogheda, County Louth
19:45 GMT	Gary Deegan (yellow card) 19'; Dane Massey 22'; Mark Doyle 45'; Daniel O'Reilly (yellow card) 72'; Chris Lyons (yellow card) 85'; Jordan Adeyemo 88'	Report	John Mountney (yellow card) 7'; Jamie Lennon (yellow card) 20'; Nahum Melvin-Lambert 82'; Matty Smith (yellow card) 85'	Stadium: Head In The Game Park; Attendance: 0 Referee: Paul McLoughlin
Note: Played behind closed doors due to COVID-19 restrictions Live on WatchLOI

21 May 2021 12	St Patrick's Athletic	2–1	Bohemians	Inchicore, Dublin 8
17:45 GMT	Ian Bermingham (yellow card) 9'; Sam Bone (yellow card) 69'; Jamie Lennon (yellow card) 84'; Billy King (yellow card) 84'; John Mountney (yellow card) 89'; Paddy Barrett (yellow card) 89'; Ben McCormack (yellow card) 89'; Robbie Benson 90+2' (pen.)	Report	Georgie Kelly (penalty missed) 10'; Ali Coote (yellow card) 60'; Rob Cornwall (yellow card) 72'; Liam Burt (yellow card) 83'; Dawson Devoy 90' (pen.)	Stadium: Richmond Park; Attendance: 0 Referee: Rob Hennessey
Note: Played behind closed doors due to COVID-19 restrictions Live on WatchLOI

24 May 2021 13	Derry City	2–2	St Patrick's Athletic	Derry, Northern Ireland
17:45 GMT	Ronan Boyce 27'; Joe Thomson 69'; Ciaron Harkin (yellow card) 85'; Joe Thomson (yellow card) 88'	Report	Lee Desmond 22'; Billy King 84'	Stadium: Ryan McBride Brandywell Stadium; Attendance: 0 Referee: Rob Harvey
Note: Played behind closed doors due to COVID-19 restrictions Live on WatchLOI

28 May 2021 14	St Patrick's Athletic	0–2	Dundalk	Inchicore, Dublin 8
19:45 GMT	Sam Bone (yellow card) 14'	Report	Sam Bone 32' (o.g.); David McMillan 51'; Alessio Abibi (yellow card) 77'; Val Adedokun (yellow card) 85'	Stadium: Richmond Park; Attendance: 0 Referee: Neil Doyle
Note: Played behind closed doors due to COVID-19 restrictions Live on WatchLOI

12 June 2021 15	Longford Town	1–3	St Patrick's Athletic	Mullolagher, County Longford
19:30 GMT	Aaron O'Driscoll (yellow card) 10'; Aaron Robinson (yellow card) 25'; Dylan Grimes (yellow card) 31'; Aodh Dervin (yellow card) 43'; Aaron Dobbs 48' (pen.)	Report	Ian Bermingham (yellow card) 37'; Robbie Benson 41'; Alfie Lewis (yellow card) 48'; Paddy Barrett (yellow card) 50'; Matty Smith 63'; Ronan Coughlan 81'	Stadium: Bishopsgate; Attendance: 200; Referee: Derek Tomney
Note: Attendance restricted to 200 due to COVID-19 restrictions Live on LOITV

18 June 2021 16	St Patrick's Athletic	2–0	Sligo Rovers	Inchicore, Dublin 8
19:45 GMT	Matty Smith 7'; Paddy Barrett (yellow card) 15'; Ronan Coughlan 73' (pen.)	Report	Greg Bolger (yellow card) 72'; John Mahon (yellow card) 72'	Stadium: Richmond Park; Attendance: 200; Referee: Paul McLaughlin
Note: Attendance restricted to 200 due to COVID-19 restrictions Live on LOITV

21 June 2021 17	St Patrick's Athletic	4–1	Finn Harps	Inchicore, Dublin 8
19:45 GMT	Ronan Coughlan 38'; Robbie Benson 62'; Ronan Coughlan 67'; Alfie Lewis 86'	Report	Adam Foley 73'; Kosovar Sadiki (yellow card) 77'	Stadium: Richmond Park; Attendance: 200; Referee: Rob Harvey
Note: Attendance restricted to 200 due to COVID-19 restrictions Live on LOITV

25 June 2021 18	Waterford	1–1	St Patrick's Athletic	Waterford City, County Waterford
19:45 GMT	Niall O'Keefe (yellow card) 26'; Shane Griffin 35'; Adam O'Reilly (yellow card) 60'; Jamie Mascoll (yellow card) 84'	Report	Matty Smith 8'; Alfie Lewis (red card) 18'; Darragh Burns (yellow card) 24'; Chris Forrester (yellow card) 86'	Stadium: RSC; Attendance: 200; Referee: John McLoughlin
Note: Attendance restricted to 200 due to COVID-19 restrictions Live on LOITV

2 July 2021 19	Bohemians	3–2	St Patrick's Athletic	Phibsborough, Dublin 7
19:45 GMT	Georgie Kelly 44'; Tyreke Wilson 73'; Ali Coote (yellow card) 80'; Liam Burt 81'	Report	Sam Bone (yellow card) 10'; Billy King (yellow card) 14'; Lee Desmond (yellow card) 40'; Andy Lyons 53' (o.g.); Lee Desmond (yellow card) 72' (yellow-red card); Ian Bermingham (yellow card) 79'; Ian Bermingham (yellow card) 85' (yellow-red card); Chris Forrester (yellow card) 89'; Jason McClelland 90+2'	Stadium: Dalymount Park; Attendance: 100; Referee: Rob Hennessey
Note: Attendance restricted to 100 due to COVID-19 restrictions Live on LOITV

9 July 2021 20	St Patrick's Athletic	1–0	Derry City	Inchicore, Dublin 8
19:45 GMT	Chris Forrester 24'; Jamie Lennon (yellow card) 35'; Jamie Lennon (yellow card) 57' (yellow-red card); Ben McCormack (yellow card) 90+3'	Report	Jack Malone (yellow card) 18'; Eoin Toal (yellow card) 87'	Stadium: Richmond Park; Attendance: 500; Referee: Neil Doyle
Note: Attendance restricted to 500 due to COVID-19 restrictions Live on LOITV

16 July 2021 21	St Patrick's Athletic	2–0	Drogheda United	Inchicore, Dublin 8
19:45 GMT	Matty Smith (yellow card) 45+1'; Chris Forrester 61'; Jason McClelland (yellow card) 68'; Robbie Benson 79'; Chris Forrester (yellow card) 88'	Report	Jake Hyland (yellow card) 90+2'	Stadium: Richmond Park; Attendance: 750; Referee: Derek Tomney
Note: Attendance restricted to 750 due to COVID-19 restrictions Live on LOITV

30 July 2021 22	Shamrock Rovers	3–1	St Patrick's Athletic	Tallaght, Dublin 24
20:00 GMT	Danny Mandroiu 30'; Dylan Watts (yellow card) 40'; Lee Grace (yellow card) 42'; Roberto Lopes 60'; Roberto Lopes (yellow card) 64'; Danny Mandroiu 71'	Report	Paddy Barrett (yellow card) 43'; John Mountney 45+1'	Stadium: Tallaght Stadium; Attendance: 1,500; Referee: Derek Tomney
Note: Attendance restricted to 1,500 due to COVID-19 restrictions Live on LOITV

8 August 2021 23	Dundalk	1–4	St Patrick's Athletic	Dundalk, County Louth
15:00 GMT	Patrick Hoban 26'; David McMillan (yellow card) 72'	Report	Nahum Melvin-Lambert 12'; Lee Desmond (yellow card) 30'; Matty Smith 42'; Matty Smith (yellow card) 57'; Ian Bermingham (yellow card) 66'; Ben McCormack (yellow card) 70'; Chris Forrester 72' (pen.); Matty Smith 79'	Stadium: Oriel Park; Attendance: 200; Referee: Rob Harvey
Note: Attendance restricted to 200 due to COVID-19 restrictions Live on LOITV

13 August 2021 24	St Patrick's Athletic	2–1	Waterford	Inchicore, Dublin 8
19:45 GMT	Matty Smith 23'; Ben McCormack (yellow card) 45+1'; Paddy Barrett (yellow card) 55'; Nahum Melvin-Lambert 58'; Sam Bone (yellow card) 90'	Report	Niall O'Keefe (yellow card) 28'; Eddie Nolan (yellow card) 51'; Junior Quitirna 64' (pen.)	Stadium: Richmond Park; Attendance: 750; Referee: John McLoughlin
Note: Attendance restricted to 750 due to COVID-19 restrictions Live on LOITV

20 August 2021 25	Finn Harps	3–1	St Patrick's Athletic	Ballybofey, County Donegal
20:00 GMT	Tunde Owolabi 12'; Tunde Owolabi 42'; Tunde Owolabi 53'	Report	Chris Forrester 16' (pen.)	Stadium: Finn Park; Attendance: 800; Referee: Damien McGrath
Note: Attendance restricted to 800 due to COVID-19 restrictions Live on LOITV

3 September 2021 26	St Patrick's Athletic	3–2	Longford Town	Inchicore, Dublin 8
19:45 GMT	James Abankwah (yellow card) 19'; Billy King 29'; Chris Forrester 67'; Darragh Burns 88'	Report	Dean Williams 51'; Conor Davis 90+6'	Stadium: Richmond Park; Attendance: 2,000 (Est.); Referee: Rob Hennessy
Note: Attendance restricted to 2,500 due to COVID-19 restrictions Live on LOITV

10 September 2021 27	Sligo Rovers	2–0	St Patrick's Athletic	Sligo, County Sligo
19:45 GMT	Johnny Kenny 3' (pen.); Garry Buckley (yellow card) 17'; Adam McDonnell (yellow card) 25'; Johnny Kenny (yellow card) 33'; Ryan De Vries 44'; Walter Figueira (yellow card) 90'	Report	Matty Smith (yellow card) 36'; Billy King (yellow card) 56'	Stadium: The Showgrounds; Attendance: 2,100; Referee: Paul McLaughlin
Note: Attendance restricted to 2,100 due to COVID-19 restrictions Live on RTÉ Two

24 September 2021 28	St Patrick's Athletic	0–1	Shamrock Rovers	Inchicore, Dublin 8
19:45 GMT		Report	Barry Cotter (yellow card) 66'; Nahum Melvin-Lambert 90+2' (o.g.)	Stadium: Richmond Park; Attendance: 2,500; Referee: Rob Hennessey
Note: Attendance restricted to 2,500 due to COVID-19 restrictions Live on RTÉ Two

1 October 2021 29	Drogheda United	0–1	St Patrick's Athletic	Drogheda, County Louth
19:45 GMT	Conor Kane (yellow card) 73'	Report	Ben McCormack (yellow card) 79'; Alfie Lewis 90+4'	Stadium: Head In The Game Park; Referee: Damien McGrath
Note: Live on RTÉ Two

15 October 2021 30	Derry City	1–0	St Patrick's Athletic	Derry, Northern Ireland
19:45 GMT	Ronan Boyce (yellow card) 40'; Junior Ogedi-Uzokwe 63'; Daniel Lafferty (yellow card) 75'; Daniel Lafferty (yellow card) 84' (yellow-red card); Jack Malone (yellow card) 90+5'	Report	Matty Smith (yellow card) 28'; Ronan Coughlan (red card) 84'; Chris Forrester (yellow card)	Stadium: Ryan McBride Brandywell Stadium; Attendance: 2,500; Referee: Rob Harvey
Note: Attendance restricted to 2,500 due to COVID-19 restrictions Live on LOITV

25 October 2021 31	St Patrick's Athletic	1–0	Dundalk	Inchicore, Dublin 8
19:45 GMT	Billy King 26'; Alfie Lewis (yellow card) 54'; Vítězslav Jaroš (yellow card) 74'	Report	Will Patching (yellow card) 62'; Cameron Dummigan (yellow card) 89'	Stadium: Richmond Park; Attendance: 1,500 (Est.); Referee: Graham Kelly
Note: Live on LOITV

29 October 2021 32	Longford Town	1–4	St Patrick's Athletic	Mullolagher, County Longford
19:30 GMT	Dean Williams (yellow card) 10'; Dean Williams 51'	Report	Matty Smith 29'; Chris Forrester (yellow card) 33'; Matty Smith 44'; James Abankwah (yellow card) 57'; Matty Smith (yellow card) 75'; Darragh Burns (yellow card) 78'; Alfie Lewis 84'; Matty Smith 90+1'	Stadium: Bishopsgate; Attendance: 600 (Est.); Referee: Ray Matthews
Note: Live on LOITV

1 November 2021 33	St Patrick's Athletic	2–2	Bohemians	Inchicore, Dublin 8
19:45 GMT	Billy King 12'; Jason McClelland 48'; Nahum Melvin-Lambert (yellow card) 68'; Paddy Barrett (yellow card) 69'; Jak Hickman (yellow card) 82'; Darragh Burns (yellow card) 85'; James Abankwah (yellow card) 90+4'; Robbie Benson (yellow card) 90+5'	Report	Anthony Breslin (yellow card) 36'; Ross Tierney 56'; Ross Tierney (yellow card) 60'; Promise Omochere 65'; James Finnerty (yellow card) 71'; Promise Omochere (yellow card) 83'; Ali Coote (yellow card) 87'	Stadium: Richmond Park; Attendance: 2,800 (Est.); Referee: Rob Harvey
Note: Fixture was originally set for 8 October 2021 but was postponed due to international call ups Live on LOITV

5 November 2021 34	St Patrick's Athletic	0–3	Sligo Rovers	Inchicore, Dublin 8
19:45 GMT	Matty Smith (yellow card) 80'; Ian Bermingham (yellow card) 90+1'	Report	Ryan De Vries 11'; Johnny Kenny 43'; Adam McDonnell 90+1'	Stadium: Richmond Park; Attendance: 2,000 (Est.); Referee: Paul McLaughlin
Note: Live on RTÉ Two

12 November 2021 35	St Patrick's Athletic	2–2	Finn Harps	Inchicore, Dublin 8
19:45 GMT	Billy King 14'; Darragh Burns 23'; Sam Bone (yellow card) 31'; Jamie Lennon (yellow card) 45+3'; Shane Griffin (yellow card) 63'	Report	Seán Boyd 16'; Seán Boyd 20'; Kosovar Sadiki (yellow card) 36'; Sean Boyd (yellow card) 45+3'; Mark Coyle (yellow card) 81'; Kosovar Sadiki (yellow card) 82' (yellow-red card)	Stadium: Richmond Park; Attendance: 2,200 (Est.); Referee: Neil Doyle
Note: Live on LOITV

19 November 2021 36	Waterford	0–0	St Patrick's Athletic	Waterford City, County Waterford
19:45 GMT	Jeremie Milambo (yellow card) 76'	Report	Jak Hickman (yellow card) 56'	Stadium: RSC; Attendance: 2,612; Referee: Ben Connolly
Note: Live on LOITV

=== FAI Cup ===
Win Draw Loss

23 July 2021 First Round	St Patrick's Athletic	6–0	Bray Wanderers	Inchicore, Dublin 8
19:45	Sam Bone (yellow card) 11'; Billy King 23'; Jason McClelland 38'; Ben McCormack 55'; Sam Bone 57'; Paddy Barrett 62'; Billy King 77'	Report	Daniel Jones (yellow card) 32'	Stadium: Richmond Park; Attendance: 750; Referee: John McLoughlin
Note: Attendance restricted to 750 due to COVID-19 restrictions

27 August 2021 Second Round	Cork City	1–1 (a.e.t.) (1–4 p)	St Patrick's Athletic	Turners Cross, County Cork
19:45	Darragh Crowley (yellow card) 26'; Gordon Walker (yellow card) 59'; Dylan McGlade (yellow card) 71'; Cian Bargary (yellow card) 90+1'; Barry Coffey 90+5'; Sean Kennedy (yellow card) 108'	Report	Ian Bermingham (yellow card) 59'; Jamie Lennon (yellow card) 74'; Chris Forrester 90' (pen.)	Stadium: Turners Cross; Attendance: 900; Referee: Derek Tomney
	Penalties
	Dylan McGlade (penalty scored); Barry Coffey (penalty missed); Darragh Crowley (penalty missed)		Chris Forrester (penalty scored); Ben McCormack (penalty scored); Jason McClelland (penalty scored); Alfie Lewis (penalty scored)
Note: Attendance restricted to 900 due to COVID-19 restrictions

17 September 2021 Quarter Final	St Patrick's Athletic	3–0	Wexford	Inchicore, Dublin 8
19:45	Sam Bone (red card) 7'; Paddy Barrett (yellow card) 7'; Darragh Burns 34'; Darragh Burns 63'; Ronan Coughlan 90+4' (pen.)	Report	Conor Crowley (yellow card) 33'; Paul Fox (yellow card) 38'; Lorcan Fitzgerald (yellow card) 40'; Conor Crowley (yellow card) 40' (yellow-red card); Paul Cleary (yellow card) 90+4'	Stadium: Richmond Park; Attendance: 1,800 (Est.); Referee: Derek Tomney
Note: Attendance restricted to 2,500 due to COVID-19 restrictions

22 October 2021 Semi Final	St Patrick's Athletic	3–1	Dundalk	Inchicore, Dublin 8
19:45	Billy King 26'; James Abankwah (yellow card) 44'; Jamie Lennon (yellow card) 50'; Matty Smith 57'; Paddy Barrett (yellow card) 67'; Darragh Burns 86'	Report	Patrick Hoban 41'; Sam Stanton (yellow card) 87'	Stadium: Richmond Park; Attendance: 5,500; Referee: Neil Doyle

28 November 2021 Final	St Patrick's Athletic	1–1 (a.e.t.) (4–3 p)	Bohemians	Ballsbridge, Dublin 4
16:00	Darragh Burns (yellow card) 37'; Lee Desmond (yellow card) 100'; Chris Forrester 105+2'	Report	Keith Buckley (yellow card) 90'; Rory Feely 107'	Stadium: Aviva Stadium; Attendance: 37,126; Referee: Rob Hennessey
	Penalties
	Ronan Coughlan (penalty scored); Billy King (penalty scored); Chris Forrester (penalty missed); Jason McClelland (penalty scored); Robbie Benson (penalty scored)		Dawson Devoy (penalty scored); Conor Levingston (penalty scored); Stephen Mallon (penalty scored); Tyreke Wilson (penalty missed); Keith Ward (penalty missed)

=== Friendlies ===
Win Draw Loss

==== Pre-season ====
21 February 2021	Cork City	1–2	St Patrick's Athletic	Blarney, County Cork
14:30	Ronan Hurley 70'	Report	Ronan Coughlan 5'; Ronan Murray 55' (pen.)	Stadium: O'Shea Park; Attendance: 0 (Behind Closed Doors)

26 February 2021	St Patrick's Athletic	4–0	Wexford	Inchicore, Dublin 8
19:45	Ben McCormack 21'; Chris Forrester 30'; Jamie Lennon 38'; Billy King 60'	Report		Stadium: Richmond Park; Attendance: 0 (Behind Closed Doors)

6 March 2021	St Patrick's Athletic	4–0	Cobh Ramblers	Blanchardstown, Dublin 15
14:30	Shane Griffin 15'; Jason McClelland 38'; Billy King 45'; Chris Forrester 80' (pen.)	Report		Stadium: FAI National Training Centre; Attendance: 0 (Behind Closed Doors)

13 March 2021	UCD	0–2	St Patrick's Athletic	Belfield, Dublin 4
12:00			Ronan Coughlan 60'; Matty Smith 83'	Stadium: UCD Bowl; Attendance: 0 (Behind Closed Doors)
