= Robbie Benson =

Irish footballer (born 1992)

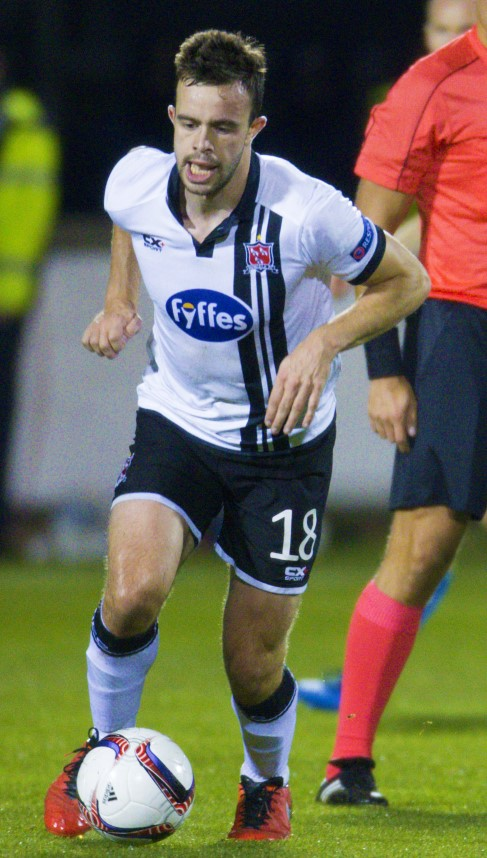
- Benson in 2016

Personal information
- Full name: Robert Benson
- Date of birth: 7 May 1992 (age 34)
- Place of birth: Athlone, Ireland
- Position: Midfielder

Senior career*
Years	Team	Apps	(Gls)
2008–2010	Athlone Town	38	(5)
2011–2015	UCD	127	(29)
2016–2019	Dundalk	96	(21)
2020–2021	St Patrick's Athletic	40	(7)
2022–2024	Dundalk	73	(8)
2025	Derry City	28	(1)
Total		386	(71)

International career^{‡}
2007–2008	Republic of Ireland U16	3	(0)
2008–2009	Republic of Ireland U17	3	(1)
- * Club domestic league appearances and goals as of 16:50, 13 November 2025 (UTC) ‡ National team caps and goals as of 00:42, 6 August 2016 (UTC)

Robert Benson (born 7 May 1992) is an Irish former professional footballer who played as a midfielder. He has also played for his hometown club, Athlone Town, UCD, Dundalk, St Patrick's Athletic and Derry City. Benson has made 10 appearances in European competition throughout his career and was part of the Dundalk team that became the first Irish side ever to reach the play-off stage of the UEFA Champions League in August 2016. Benson scored twice for the club on their European run, including a volleyed goal against Legia Warsaw in the play-off round that received worldwide media coverage.

== Early life ==
Benson was born in Athlone and attended Marist College in the town between 2004 and 2010 where he studied for his Leaving Certificate. He played underage football for local club St. Francis.

== Professional career ==
=== Athlone Town ===
Benson began his career with Athlone Town, making his debut against Waterford United in the Regional Sports Centre on 3 October 2008. He spent the following two seasons playing in the First Division with the club. After achieving 600 points in his Leaving Certificate examinations, Benson gained a scholarship with UCD in September 2010. This allowed him to combine his academic studies with football, and he majored in chemistry and maths before earning a master's degree in actuarial science.

=== UCD ===
Benson was unable to play for UCD's league side during the closing stages of the 2010 season due to scholarship regulations, however he joined up with the senior squad for the 2011 season, making 20 league appearances in the Premier Division and scoring five goals. Benson became a mainstay of the side during the 2012 season, playing a part in 31 league games for the club and scoring three goals in the process, as UCD finished ninth and avoided relegation.

Benson remained with UCD for the 2013 season, and scored a career-high nine league goals in 25 appearances during the campaign, as UCD once more finished ninth. In 2014, Benson was made the captain of the team and played in all 35 league games for the club, scoring three goals. However, UCD were relegated at the end of the season after losing a play-off to Galway United. Despite this, Benson chose to stay with UCD in 2015 as he wished to complete his studies before later making the move to full-time football. He made his European debut in July 2015, captaining his side to a 1–0 win over Dudelange in the Europa League first qualifying round. He went on to make a further 3 appearances in the Europa League as UCD eliminated Dudelange and met Slovan Bratislava in the following round. Throughout the 2015 campaign, Benson played in eighteen league games and scored seven goals as UCD ultimately lost out on promotion to the Premier Division in a play-off against Finn Harps.

=== Dundalk ===
Despite interest from St. Patrick's Athletic, Shamrock Rovers and Cork City, Benson signed for Dundalk in December 2015, citing the opportunity to work under boss Stephen Kenny as being one of the deciding factors. He scored the third goal in the 3–0 home defeat of BATE Borisov to help Dundalk become the first Irish side to reach the play-off round of the Champions League, and followed this up with a volleyed goal against Legia Warsaw in the play-off round that received widespread exposure in international media and on social media. Benson considers this to be the greatest goal of his career to date. Dundalk went on to qualify for the 2016–17 UEFA Europa League group stage for the first time and Robbie scored for Dundalk in the home game against FC Zenit Saint Petersburg, but lost 2–1. He was rewarded for his Champions League displays by being named Soccer Writers' Association of Ireland Player of the Month for August 2016. After considering offers from Scotland and England, Benson signed a new one-year contract with Dundalk in November 2017.

=== St Patrick's Athletic ===
Benson signed for St Patrick's Athletic on 13 November 2019, signing for his former teammate Stephen O'Donnell, who was less than 3 months into his first managerial role. Benson scored on his first start for the club in a 6–0 win over Fermoy in a friendly. On 28 November 2021 Benson scored the winning penalty in the 2021 FAI Cup Final penalty shootout, beating rivals Bohemians 4–3 on penalties following a 1–1 draw after extra time in front of a record FAI Cup Final crowd of 37,126 at the Aviva Stadium.

=== Return to Dundalk ===
On 17 December 2021, it was announced that Benson had followed head coach Stephen O'Donnell back to Dundalk for a second spell at the club. He remained there for 3 seasons before the club was relegated to the League of Ireland First Division at the end of the 2024 season.

=== Derry City ===
On 20 January 2025, Benson signed a one-year contract with League of Ireland Premier Division club Derry City. On 13 November 2025, it was announced that he would be leaving the club at the end of his contract, having made 29 appearances in all competitions during the season, scoring 1 goal.

== International career ==
Benson was a key member of the Irish Schools side which won the Centenary Shield in 2010 including scoring the winner against England which sealed the trophy for Ireland. He was named the FAI's Under 18 International Schools Player of the Year in 2009–10. He has also represented Ireland at under-16 and under-17 levels.

== Career statistics ==
As of match played on 1 November 2025

Appearances and goals by club, season and competition
Club	Season	League			National Cup		League Cup		Europe		Other		Total	
Club	Season	Division	Apps	Goals	Apps	Goals	Apps	Goals	Apps	Goals	Apps	Goals	Apps	Goals
Athlone Town	2008	LOI First Division	1	0	0	0	0	0	—		—		1	0
Athlone Town	2009	LOI First Division	9	3	2	0	1	0	—		—		12	3
Athlone Town	2010	LOI First Division	12	2	0	0	1	0	—		0	0	13	2
Athlone Town	Total		22	5	2	0	2	0	—		0	0	26	5
UCD	2011	LOI Premier Division	20	5	2	0	3	0	—		1 (Note: Appearances in Leinster Senior Cup)	0	26	5
UCD	2012	LOI Premier Division	31	3	2	0	2	0	—		3	1	38	4
UCD	2013	LOI Premier Division	25	9	1	0	1	0	—		0	0	27	9
UCD	2014	LOI Premier Division	33	5	1	0	0	0	—		0	0	34	5
UCD	2015	LOI First Division	18	7	1	0	0	0	4 (Note: Appearances in UEFA Europa League)	0	2 (Note: Appearances in the League of Ireland promotion/relegation play-off)	0	25	7
UCD	Total		127	29	6	0	6	0	4	0	6	1	150	30
Dundalk	2016	LOI Premier Division	24	2	5	0	1	0	11 (Note: 6 appearances 2 goals in UEFA Champions League, 5 appearances 1 goal in UEFA Europa League)	3	1	0	42	5
Dundalk	2017	LOI Premier Division	27	9	5	2	2	1	2 (Note: Appearances in UEFA Champions League)	0	1 (Note: Appearances in President's Cup)	0	37	12
Dundalk	2018	LOI Premier Division	32	9	4	0	0	0	4	0	1	0	41	9
Dundalk	2019	LOI Premier Division	13	1	3	0	1	0	3	0	2 (Note: 1 appearance in President's Cup, 1 appearance & 1 goal in Champions Cup)	1	22	2
Dundalk	Total		96	21	17	2	4	1	20	3	5	1	142	28
St Patrick's Athletic	2020	LOI Premier Division	16	2	1	0	—		—		—		17	2
St Patrick's Athletic	2021	LOI Premier Division	24	5	2	0	—		—		—		26	5
St Patrick's Athletic	Total		40	7	3	0	—		—		—		43	7
Dundalk	2022	LOI Premier Division	29	3	2	1	—		—		—		31	4
Dundalk	2023	LOI Premier Division	14	1	1	0	—		0 (Note: Appearances in UEFA Europa Conference League)	0	1	0	16	1
Dundalk	2024	LOI Premier Division	30	4	1	0	—		—		1	0	32	4
Dundalk	Total		73	8	4	1	—		0	0	2	0	79	9
Derry City	2025	LOI Premier Division	28	1	1	0	—		—		—		29	1
Career total			386	71	33	3	12	1	24	3	13	2	468	80

== Honours ==
DUNDALK PREMIER DIVISION 2016 2018 2019 FAI CUP 2018 LEAGUE CUP 2017 2019 ST PATS FAI CUP 2021

=== Individual ===
- League of Ireland Premier Division Player of the Month: August 2016
