= Vítězslav Jaroš =

Czech footballer (born 2001)

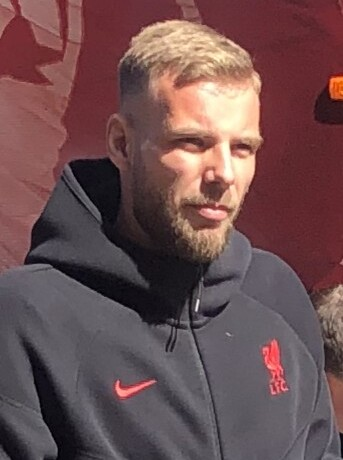
- Jaroš with Liverpool in 2025

Personal information
- Full name: Vítězslav Jaroš
- Date of birth: 23 July 2001 (age 25)
- Place of birth: Příbram, Czech Republic
- Height: 1.90 m (6 ft 3 in)
- Position: Goalkeeper

Team information
- Current team: Liverpool
- Number: 56

Youth career
- 2008–2011: FK Příbram
- 2011–2017: Slavia Prague
- 2017–2020: Liverpool

Senior career*
Years	Team	Apps	(Gls)
2020–	Liverpool	1	(0)
2021	→ St Patrick's Athletic (loan)	34	(0)
2022	→ Notts County (loan)	15	(0)
2022–2023	→ Stockport County (loan)	11	(0)
2024	→ Sturm Graz (loan)	14	(0)
2025–2026	→ Ajax (loan)	19	(0)

International career^{‡}
2016–2017	Czech Republic U16	5	(0)
2018	Czech Republic U18	3	(0)
2022–2023	Czech Republic U21	6	(0)
2024–	Czech Republic	2	(0)
- * Club domestic league appearances and goals as of 04:38, 15 February 2026 (UTC) ‡ National team caps and goals as of 20:16, 8 September 2025 (UTC)

Vítězslav Jaroš (born 23 July 2001) is a Czech professional footballer who plays as a goalkeeper for Premier League club Liverpool, and the Czech Republic national team.

== Club career ==
=== Early career ===
Jaroš started out with his local club FK Příbram where he played for three years before joining Slavia Prague in 2011. He spent six years there before signing for Liverpool in 2017, joining the club's Academy set-up and winning the FA Youth Cup in his second season with the side.

In the summer of 2019, he made his first appearance for the senior side in a pre-season friendly against Tranmere Rovers, playing the second half of a 6–0 win. Shortly after that he picked up an injury in training that halted his progress, taking a knock to his elbow from close range that tore a ligament off the bone and a little bit of the bone away, with the injury requiring surgery that caused him to miss several months.

=== Liverpool ===
Jaroš first involvement with the Liverpool first team squad in a competitive fixture came in February 2020, when he was named on the bench for their FA Cup Fourth Round replay against Shrewsbury Town. He signed a new long-term contract with the club on 9 July 2020. The following season, Jaroš was on the bench again for three Champions League fixtures, at home and away against Ajax and away to Midtjylland, although he remained an unused substitute in all three.

==== Loan to St Patrick's Athletic ====
On 3 February 2021, it was announced that Jaroš had joined League of Ireland Premier Division side St Patrick's Athletic on loan for the duration of the 2021 season. This made him the second ever player from the Czech Republic to sign for the club, after fellow Příbram native Michal Macek. He made his debut for St Pats, and his senior competitive debut, on 19 March 2021, in a 1–1 draw with Shamrock Rovers in the Dublin derby at Tallaght Stadium. Jaroš' debut performance saw him draw high praise from his manager Stephen O'Donnell who stated "He's shown tonight what he's shown all pre-season. For a player so young, 19 years of age, to have such a good mentality and be so composed – if you were coming in and didn't know his age, you’re saying: ‘That’s a seasoned veteran, that’s a real pro’." He kept the first clean sheet of his senior career on 3 April 2021, as his side won 1–0 away to Bohemians in the Dublin City derby at Dalymount Park to go top of the league.

Jaroš went on to keep five clean sheets in six games as his side remained unbeaten after nine games, conceding just four goals. On 12 November 2021, Jaroš was named as the club's Player of the Year, as voted by the club's supporters following a debut season that saw him help his side to a 2nd place finish, their best since the club's 2013 title win. On 28 November 2021, Jaroš made his last appearance for the club in the 2021 FAI Cup Final, beating rivals Bohemians 4–3 on penalties following a 1–1 draw after extra time in front of a record FAI Cup Final crowd of 37,126 at the Aviva Stadium. He departed the club at the end of the season, waiting for guidance from Jürgen Klopp on where his next move would be, with the Liverpool manager stating "Vit was brilliant in Ireland", while Pat's manager Stephen O'Donnell stated he was the best 20-year-old goalkeeper he had ever seen, including Kasper Schmeichel who was a teammate of his at Falkirk at the same age. On 26 January 2022, it was announced that Jaroš had been named SWI Goalkeeper of the Year as voted by Irish journalists.

==== Loan to Notts County ====
On 27 January 2022, Jaroš moved to National League side Notts County on loan until the end of the season. He made his debut for the club on 1 March 2022 in a 3–1 loss away to Chesterfield. His first clean sheet for the club came on his fifth appearance for the club, in a 2–0 win over Eastleigh at Meadow Lane on 19 February 2022. He made a total of 15 appearances for the club during his loan spell, as they missed out on promotion to EFL League Two in the playoffs.

==== Loan to Stockport County ====
On 4 July 2022, Jaroš signed for EFL League Two club Stockport County on a season-long loan. Jaroš made his debut for the club on 9 August 2022 in an EFL Cup tie away to Harrogate Town in which he kept a clean sheet in a 1–0 win. He followed that up by keeping another clean sheet in a 1–0 win four days later in a victory at home to Colchester United in his league debut for the club. On 23 August 2022, Jaroš kept a clean sheet in a 0–0 draw with Premier League side Leicester City in an EFL Cup tie, also saving a penalty from James Maddison in the shootout as his side were defeated 3–1 on penalties. He made 13 appearances for the club in all competitions during his loan spell.

==== Loan to Sturm Graz ====
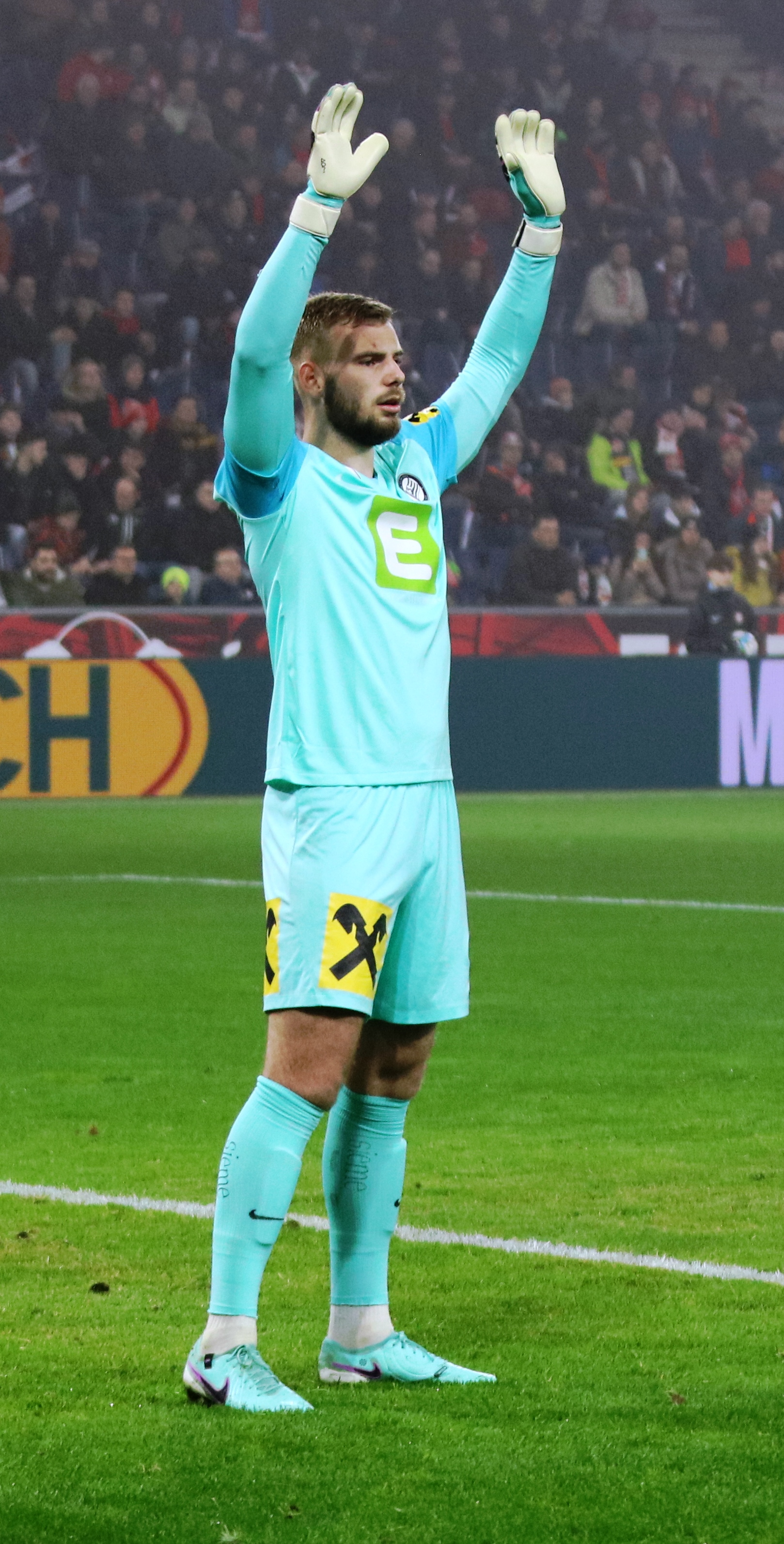
Jaroš with Sturm Graz in 2024

On 9 January 2024, Jaroš signed a new contract with Liverpool and joined Austrian Bundesliga club Sturm Graz on loan. He made the first European appearance of his career on 15 February 2024 in a 4–1 win over Slovan Bratislava in the UEFA Europa Conference League. On 1 May 2024, he was part of the side that won the 2023–24 Austrian Cup after 2–1 victory over Rapid Wien in the final. He made 21 appearances in all competitions during his loan spell which concluded with winning the 2023–24 Austrian Bundesliga to complete the double and end Red Bull Salzburg's 10-year-long title-winning streak.

==== Return to Liverpool ====
On 5 October 2024, Jaroš made his Liverpool and Premier League debut, replacing Alisson in the 79th minute of a 1–0 away victory over Crystal Palace. He made his full debut for the club on 30 October 2024, starting in a 3–2 away win against Brighton & Hove Albion in the EFL Cup, earning praise for a fingertip save onto the post from a Simon Adingra header in the 50th minute. Jaroš received a Premier League medal for Liverpool on 25 May 2025 for his efforts during the season. He became the first Czech to win the league since Petr Čech with Chelsea in 2015.

==== Loan to Ajax ====
On 18 June 2025, Jaroš signed a new contract with Liverpool and joined Eredivise club Ajax on a season long loan, taking the number 1 shirt. On 17 September 2025, he made the first UEFA Champions League appearance of his career, in a 2–0 defeat against Inter Milan at the Johan Cruyff Arena. He made 26 appearances in all competitions before suffering a serious knee injury in training in February 2026 that would rule him out injured for the remainder of the season.

== International career ==
Jaroš has represented the Czech Republic at various youth levels, with first call-up to the Czech Republic U21 team coming in September 2021. He debuted for the youth team in a 3–0 victory against Andorra U21 on 29 March 2022.

Jaroš was called up to the senior Czech Republic squad for the first time for the March 2024 friendly matches against Norway and Armenia. In May 2024, he was named in the squad for UEFA Euro 2024. Jaroš made his senior international debut on 7 June 2024 in a 7–1 friendly victory against Malta in Grödig, Austria, coming as a substitute for Matěj Kovář at half-time.

== Career statistics ==
=== Club ===
As of match played 14 February 2026

Appearances and goals by club, season and competition
Club	Season	League			National cup (Note: Includes FAI Cup, Austrian Cup, KNVB Cup)		League cup (Note: Includes EFL Cup)		Europe		Other		Total	
Club	Season	Division	Apps	Goals	Apps	Goals	Apps	Goals	Apps	Goals	Apps	Goals	Apps	Goals
Liverpool U21	2020–21	—			—		—		—		2 (Note: Appearances in EFL Trophy)	0	2	0
Liverpool	2019–20	Premier League	0	0	0	0	0	0	0	0	0	0	0	0
Liverpool	2020–21	Premier League	0	0	—		0	0	0	0	0	0	0	0
Liverpool	2021–22	Premier League	0	0	0	0	0	0	0	0	—		0	0
Liverpool	2022–23	Premier League	0	0	—		—		—		—		0	0
Liverpool	2023–24	Premier League	0	0	—		0	0	0	0	—		0	0
Liverpool	2024–25	Premier League	1	0	0	0	1	0	0	0	—		2	0
Liverpool	2025–26	Premier League	0	0	—		—		—		—		0	0
Liverpool	2026–27	Premier League	0	0	0	0	0	0	0	0	—		0	0
Liverpool	Total		1	0	0	0	1	0	0	0	0	0	2	0
St Patrick's Athletic (loan)	2021	LOI Premier Division	34	0	5	0	—		—		—		39	0
Notts County (loan)	2021–22	National League	15	0	—		—		—		0	0	15	0
Stockport County (loan)	2022–23	League Two	11	0	0	0	2	0	—		0	0	13	0
Sturm Graz (loan)	2023–24	Austrian Bundesliga	14	0	3	0	—		4 (Note: Appearances in UEFA Europa Conference League)	0	—		21	0
Ajax (loan)	2025–26	Eredivise	19	0	1	0	—		6 (Note: Appearances in UEFA Champions League)	0	0	0	26	0
Career total			94	0	9	0	3	0	10	0	2	0	118	0

=== International ===
As of match played 8 September 2025

Appearances and goals by national team and year
National team	Year	Apps	Goals
Czech Republic
Czech Republic	2024	1	0
Czech Republic	2025	1	0
Total		2	0

== Honours ==
Liverpool Youth

- FA Youth Cup: 2018–19

St Patrick's Athletic

- FAI Cup: 2021

Sturm Graz

- Austrian Bundesliga: 2023–24
- Austrian Cup: 2023–24

Liverpool

- Premier League: 2024–25

Individual

- St Patrick's Athletic Player of the Year: 2021
