= James Abankwah =

Irish footballer (born 2004)

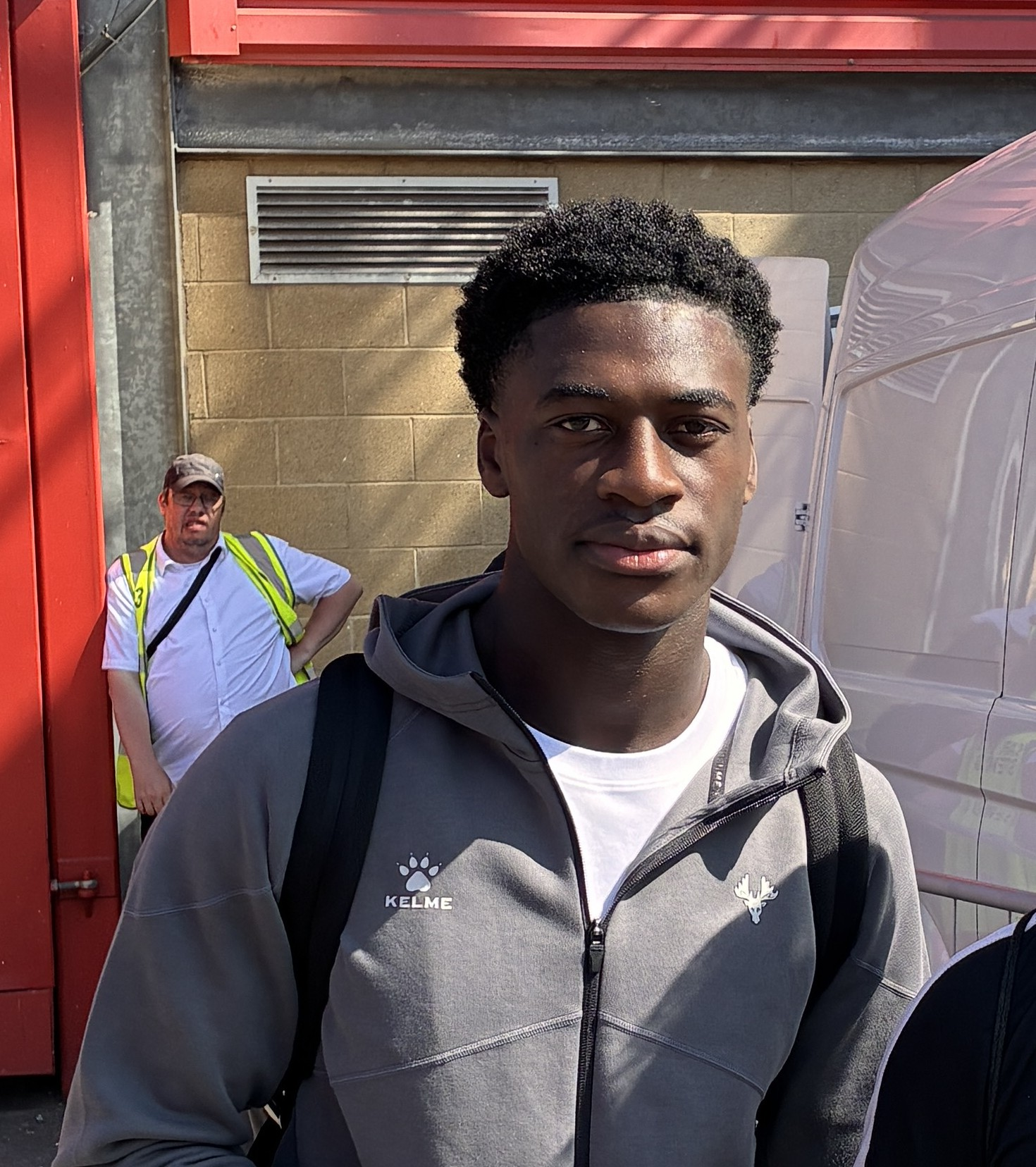
- Abankwah with Watford in 2025

Personal information
- Full name: James Bright Adusei Abankwah
- Date of birth: 16 January 2004 (age 22)
- Place of birth: Waterford, Ireland
- Height: 1.88 m (6 ft 2 in)
- Positions: Centre back; right back

Team information
- Current team: Udinese
- Number: 14

Youth career
- 2011: Letterkenny Rovers
- 2011–2016: Melview
- 2016–2019: Cherry Orchard
- 2019–2021: St Patrick's Athletic

Senior career*
Years	Team	Apps	(Gls)
2021–2022	St Patrick's Athletic	9	(0)
2022–	Udinese	18	(1)
2022	→ St Patrick's Athletic (loan)	11	(0)
2023–2024	→ Charlton Athletic (loan)	2	(0)
2025	→ Watford (loan)	19	(0)
2025–2026	→ Watford (loan)	31	(1)

International career^{‡}
2019	Republic of Ireland U16	4	(0)
2021	Republic of Ireland U18	1	(0)
2021–2023	Republic of Ireland U19	13	(1)
2023–2025	Republic of Ireland U21	14	(0)
2026–	Republic of Ireland	9	(0)
- * Club domestic league appearances and goals as of 22:03, 17 November 2026 (UTC) ‡ National team caps and goals as of 21:42, 17 November 2026 (UTC)

James Bright Adusei Abankwah (born 16 January 2004) is an Irish professional footballer who plays as a defender for Serie A club Udinese, and the Republic of Ireland national team. Abankwah is a product of St Patrick's Athletic's youth academy.

== Club career ==
=== Early career ===
Abankwah was born in Waterford to Ghanaian parents who were working as religious missionaries in Ireland, before moving to Celbridge, then to Lucan before moving to Letterkenny where he began playing football with local side Letterkenny Rovers in 2011. He later moved to Longford with his family, where he played for local club Melview FC and also represented Longford at the prestigious Kennedy Cup youth tournament at Under-14 level in 2016, before the family moved again, returning to Lucan in Ireland's capital, Dublin. While still living in Longford, Abankwah signed for top Dublin schoolboy club Cherry Orchard, travelling to Dublin training by lifts from his parents and also by bus, aged 12. It was there where his performances attracted the interest of scouts from local League of Ireland club St Patrick's Athletic who signed Abankwah for their Under-15 team in January 2019, aged 14. On 24 October 2019, Abankwah was part of the side that won the Under-15 League of Ireland title, as they defeated rivals Shamrock Rovers 2–1 at Tallaght Stadium to claim the trophy. A month later they defeated the same opposition in the Under-15 Cup final on penalties at Richmond Park to win the double. In 2020, he was promoted straight to the Under-19 team, three years above his age group, where on 22 December 2020, he was part of the team that won the League of Ireland U19 Division Final, beating rivals Bohemians 2–1 after extra time at the UCD Bowl to secure a UEFA Youth League spot for the club.

=== St Patrick's Athletic ===
==== 2021 season ====
On 7 July 2021, Abankwah signed his first professional contract at League of Ireland Premier Division side St Patrick's Athletic, having impressed for the club's academy teams. He made his senior debut just two days later aged just 17 when he came off the bench for Alfie Lewis in the 62nd minute of a 1–0 win over Derry City. His first start for the club was on 3 September 2021, a 3–2 win over Longford Town. On 28 November 2021, he became the youngest ever player to appear in an FAI Cup Final at 17 years old when he replaced Paddy Barrett in the 80th minute of the 2021 FAI Cup Final, as his side defeated rivals Bohemians 4–3 on penalties following a 1–1 draw after extra time in front of a record FAI Cup Final crowd of 37,126 at the Aviva Stadium. He made a total of 13 appearances in all competitions during the 2021 season, his first in senior football.

==== 2022 season ====
On 25 January 2022, it was announced that the club had sold Abankwah to Italian side Udinese for an undisclosed fee believed to a record fee paid for a League of Ireland player (at the time), believed to be in the region of €800,000 plus add ons. As part of the transfer, he was loaned back to St Patrick's Athletic until 30 June 2022, in order to allow him complete his Leaving Certificate exams at his school, Adamstown Community College, alongside playing for the club. Before the season started, manager Tim Clancy stated that there were 'no limitations' set out by Udinese on Abankwah's playing time, while he also mentioned 'It'll be a pleasure to work with him' during his loan.

On 11 February 2022, Abankwah was in the starting XI in the 2022 President of Ireland's Cup against Shamrock Rovers at Tallaght Stadium, eventually being replaced by Tom Grivosti in the 76th minute due to an injury, as his side lost 5–4 on penalties after a 1–1 draw. On 18 February 2022, in the opening league game of the season away to Dublin rivals Shelbourne, Abankwah played his first full 90 minutes of his senior career with his performance in the 3–0 win at Tolka Park drawing comparisons in his playing style to that of former St Patrick's Athletic and Manchester United defender Paul McGrath.

=== Udinese ===
On 25 January 2022, it was announced that Abankwah had signed for Serie A club Udinese on a four-and-a-half-year contract. Ahead of joining up with the team in the summer of 2022, Abankwah revealed that he was taking Italian language lessons twice a week. Abankwah made his unofficial debut for the club on 13 July 2022, playing the second half of an 11–0 friendly win over Rapid Lienz. On 20 July 2022, it was announced that Abankwah's squad number would be the number 14. Abankwah made his debut for the club on 2 April 2023, replacing Sandi Lovrić from the bench in a defeat away to Bologna. He then made his first Serie A start on 4 June, in a 0–1 loss against Juventus, with manager Andrea Sottil stating after the match that Abankwah was one of the players that are "the future of Udinese".

==== Charlton Athletic loan ====
On 1 September 2023, Abankwah joined League One club Charlton Athletic on a season-long loan. Shortly after moving, Abankwah stated "Udinese were good enough to let me go, to play more games. I felt like England was the best place to go. I feel great about the move. It's a great opportunity for me. I'm ready to step into Charlton and give it my best shot." He made his debut on 16 September in a 1–1 draw away to Stevenage at Broadhall Way, playing at right back. On 22 December 2023, it was reported that Abankwah's loan had been terminated having only made three first team appearances in all competitions since arriving. Udinese officially confirmed Abankwah's return to the club on 29 January 2024.

==== 2024–25 season ====
Abankwah featured eight times for Udinese in all competitions in the 2024–25 season before being awarded with a new four-and-a-half-year contract due to run to the summer of 2029, on 16 January 2025, the same day that he was loaned out to gain more game time and experience.

==== Watford loans ====
On his 21st birthday, 16 January 2025, Abankwah joined Championship club Watford on loan for the rest of the 2024–25 season. He made his debut 2 days later in a 2–0 win away to Derby County at Pride Park. He made a total of 19 appearances for the club during his loan spell.

On 30 June 2025, he returned to Watford on a season long loan deal. On 25 April 2026, Abankwah scored the first goal of his senior career in a defeat away to Middlesbrough. He made 32 appearances in all competitions during his 2025–26 season long loan.

==== Return from Watford ====
After returning to Udinese from his loan spells at Watford, Abankwah was put straight into the starting XI, starting their first Serie A game of the season in a 1–1 draw at home to Como. On 14 September 2026, he scored his first goal for Udinese, opening the scoring away to Inter Milan with a 9th minute header in an eventual 5–3 defeat at the San Siro.

== International career ==
As well as the Republic of Ireland, his country of birth, Abankwah is also eligible to represent Ghana at international level due to his parents being from there.

=== Under 15 & 16 ===
Abankwah received his first callup to the Republic of Ireland U15 squad in January 2019, but did not feature in any of the 3 friendly games during the trip to Spain. His first international appearances came for the Republic of Ireland U16 team against Denmark U16 and England U16 in August 2019. In October 2019, he was included in the Republic of Ireland U16 squad for the following month's Victory Shield tournament played in Wales. He featured against Scotland U16 and Northern Ireland U16 at the tournament.

=== Under 18 & 19 ===
He was named as captain of the Under-18 side by manager Colin O'Brien in November 2021 for a 0–0 draw with Malta U18 in a friendly. He made his first Republic of Ireland U19 appearances on 8 & 11 October 2021, playing in both a 2–2 and a 1–1 draw with Sweden U19 in two friendlies. He started all three of the team's 2022 UEFA European Under-19 Championship qualification matches on their November 2021 trip to Bulgaria, featuring against Montenegro U19, Bosnia and Herzegovina U19 and Bulgaria U19, helping his team to qualify for the Elite Phase. Abankwah's first goal at international level came on 23 March 2022, scoring an equaliser in an eventual 3–1 defeat away to England U19 at Bescot Stadium in Walsall.

=== Under 21 ===
Abankwah was called up to the Republic of Ireland U21s for the first time on 6 June 2023 for the team's friendly fixtures against Gabon U23, Ukraine U21 & Kuwait U22 in Austria on 13, 16 & 19 June 2023. Abankwah made his Republic of Ireland U21 debut on 16 June 2023, in a 2–2 draw with Ukraine U21. He became the captain of the U21 side in November 2024, ahead of the start of the 2027 UEFA European Under-21 Championship qualification campaign.

=== Senior ===
On 13 March 2025, Abankwah received his first call up to the Republic of Ireland senior team, for their UEFA Nations League games against Bulgaria.

On 31 March 2026, Abankwah made his senior debut for the Republic of Ireland, replacing Seamus Coleman from the bench in the 61st minute of a 0–0 draw with North Macedonia in a Friendly at the Aviva Stadium.

== Career statistics ==
=== Club ===
As of match played 6 November 2026

Appearances and goals by club, season and competition
Club	Season	League			National Cup (Note: Includes FAI Cup, Coppa Italia & FA Cup)		League Cup (Note: Includes EFL Cup)		Other		Total	
Club	Season	Division	Apps	Goals	Apps	Goals	Apps	Goals	Apps	Goals	Apps	Goals
St Patrick's Athletic	2021	League of Ireland Premier Division	9	0	4	0	–		–		13	0
Udinese	2021–22	Serie A	0	0	–		–		–		0	0
Udinese	2022–23	Serie A	2	0	0	0	–		–		2	0
Udinese	2023–24	Serie A	0	0	0	0	–		–		0	0
Udinese	2024–25	Serie A	6	0	2	0	–		–		8	0
Udinese	2025–26	Serie A	0	0	0	0	–		–		0	0
Udinese	2025–26	Serie A	0	0	0	0	–		–		0	0
Udinese	2026–27	Serie A	10	1	2	0	–		–		12	1
Udinese	Total		18	1	4	0	–		–		22	1
St Patrick's Athletic (loan)	2022	League of Ireland Premier Division	11	0	–		–		1 (Note: Appearance in the President of Ireland's Cup)	0	12	0
Charlton Athletic (loan)	2023–24	League One	2	0	1	0	0	0	0	0	3	0
Watford (loan)	2024–25	Championship	19	0	–		–		–		19	0
Watford (loan)	2025–26	Championship	31	1	1	0	0	0	–		32	1
Career total			90	2	10	0	0	0	1	0	101	2

=== International ===
As of match played on 17 November 2026

Appearances and goals by national team and year
National team	Year	Apps	Goals
Republic of Ireland
Republic of Ireland	2026	9	0
Total		9	0

== Honours ==
St Patrick's Athletic

- FAI Cup: 2021
