= Darragh Burns =

Irish footballer

Personal information
- Full name: Darragh Francis O'Brien Burns
- Date of birth: 6 August 2002 (age 24)
- Place of birth: Stamullen, Ireland
- Height: 5 ft 9 1/4 in (1.76 m)
- Position: Winger

Team information
- Current team: Derry City
- Number: 12

Youth career
- 2006–2011: Swords Manor
- Shelbourne
- –2018: St Kevin's Boys
- 2018–2020: St Patrick's Athletic

Senior career*
Years	Team	Apps	(Gls)
2019–2022	St Patrick's Athletic	54	(8)
2022–2025	Milton Keynes Dons	14	(0)
2024	→ Shamrock Rovers (loan)	28	(5)
2025–2026	Grimsby Town	49	(1)
2026–	Derry City	10	(0)

International career^{‡}
2018–2019	Northern Ireland U17	9	(2)
2018	Republic of Ireland U17	2	(1)
2019	Northern Ireland U19	1	(0)
2022	Republic of Ireland U20	1	(0)
2023	Republic of Ireland U21	2	(0)
- * Club domestic league appearances and goals as of 10:25, 30 October 2026 (UTC) ‡ National team caps and goals as of 01:19, 16 October 2024 (UTC)

Darragh Francis O'Brien Burns (born 6 August 2002) is an Irish professional footballer who plays as a winger for League of Ireland Premier Division club Derry City.

== Club career ==
=== Youth career ===
Raised in Stamullen, County Meath, Burns began playing with Swords Manor from the age of 4 until age 9, before moving on to Shelbourne and then on to top Dublin academy St Kevin's Boys, a club renowned for producing several Republic of Ireland senior internationals. In April 2017, while at Under-15 level, he scored the winning goal in the Final of the Ravenna European Cup played in Ravenna, Italy. During the tournament his side won all eight games against clubs from all over Europe to win the tournament, with Burns also having scored several goals en route to the final.

In 2018, Burns signed for St Patrick's Athletic, where he initially represented the club's Under-17 side. On 30 October 2019, Burns was part of the side that won the League of Ireland U17 Division, setting up the opening goal for Ben McCormack as his side defeated Bohemians 4–0 in the final at Richmond Park. On 22 December 2020, in his final game at underage level, Burns scored the winning goal in the League of Ireland U19 Division Final, scoring a 120th-minute penalty to beat Bohemians 2–1 after extra time at the UCD Bowl to secure a UEFA Youth League spot for the club.

=== St Patrick's Athletic ===
==== 2019 season ====
Burns made his debut in senior football on 13 July 2019 aged 16, coming off the bench in a friendly against reigning UEFA Europa League champions Chelsea in the 59th minute. His first involvement in the game was to nutmeg France international Tiémoué Bakayoko before drawing a foul and a booking from Denmark international Andreas Christensen. Burns' first involvement with the first team in a competitive game came on 16 August 2019 when he was an unused substitute in a 2–1 win over Sligo Rovers in the league. His competitive debut in senior football on 15 September 2021, replacing Chris Forrester in the 62nd minute of a 1–0 win away to Cabinteely in the Leinster Senior Cup Quarter Final at Stradbrook Road. His first start came on 2 November in the Semi Final of the same competition, a 3–1 win away to Sheriff YC after extra time. Two weeks later Burns missed the 4–0 win over Athlone Town in the Final as he was on international duty but the win went down as his first medal at senior level.

==== 2020 season ====
On 23 January 2020, Burns signed a two-year deal with St Patrick's Athletic, his first professional contract. Ahead of the season Burns' received the number 35 as his first squad number. On 3 August 2020, he made his League of Ireland Premier Division debut, replacing Jordan Gibson from the bench in the 75th minute of a 2–0 loss at home to Derry City. He made a total of six appearances over the season, all from the bench as his side missed out on a European place on the final day of the season.

==== 2021 season ====
Burns changed to the number 17 shirt ahead of the 2021 season. His first goal in senior football came on 9 April 2021, when he scored the second goal to help secure a 2–0 home win over Derry City for his side. On 20 April, he scored the only goal of the game in the second minute to beat Waterford at Richmond Park. It was announced on 6 July 2021 that Burns had signed a contract extension with the club. He scored the winning goal in a 3–2 win over Longford Town on 3 September 2021, curly his shot into the top corner in the 87th minute before Longford got a late consolation goal. Burns scored two goals in a 3–0 win over Wexford in the FAI Cup Quarter Final on 17 September 2021. Burns produced a Man of the Match display in a 3–1 win over Dundalk FAI Cup Semi Final, setting up Matty Smith's goal to put Pat's in front before dinking Peter Cherrie in goals in the 86th minute to secure a place in the 2021 FAI Cup Final at the Aviva Stadium. On 12 November 2021, his headed equaliser in his side's 2–2 draw at home to Finn Harps secured a 2nd-place finish for the club, their best since their 2013 league win, to secure UEFA Europa Conference League football for the following season. After the game, he was awarded both the club's Young Player of the Year Award and the Goal of the Season Award for 2021, as voted by their supporters. On 28 November 2021 Burns played the full 120 minutes in the 2021 FAI Cup Final, beating rivals Bohemians 4–3 on penalties following a 1–1 draw after extra time in front of a record FAI Cup Final crowd of 37,126 at the Aviva Stadium.

==== 2022 season ====
Burns was subject to interest from Scottish Premiership sides Hibernian and Celtic during the January transfer window, with Pat's rejecting a bid from Hibs due to it not reaching their valuation for Burns. On 11 February 2022, Burns was in the starting XI for the 2022 President of Ireland's Cup against Shamrock Rovers at Tallaght Stadium, as his side lost 5–4 on penalties after a 1–1 draw. On 18 February 2022, Burns scored his side's first goal in a 3–0 win over rivals Shelbourne at Tolka Park, curling a 25-yard effort into the top corner to help his side to an opening game of the season victory. On 1 April 2022, he scored a 77th-minute equaliser to earn a point for his side in a 1–1 draw with Drogheda United at Richmond Park. On 6 May, Burns opened the scoring in a 4–0 win away to Drogheda United with a looping header from a Billy King cross flying into the top corner after four minutes, while he also assisted Kyle Robinson's first league goal for the club in the same game. On 14 May, he earned his side a point when he scored the equaliser in a 1–1 draw away to Sligo Rovers at The Showgrounds.

=== Milton Keynes Dons ===
==== 2022–23 season ====
On 4 July 2022, Burns signed for EFL League One club Milton Keynes Dons on a permanent deal for a fee in the region of €180,000. His first goals for the club came on 15 July 2022 when he scored a brace and assisted another goal in a 6–0 friendly win over Norwich City. Burns made his league debut on 30 July 2022 as an 82nd-minute substitute in a 1–0 defeat away to Cambridge United. On 23 August 2022, Burns scored his first competitive goal for the club in a 2–0 EFL Cup second round away win over Watford, after also assisting the opening goal of the game for Matthew Dennis. On 5 November 2022, Burns scored his first FA Cup goal, when he put his side 3–0 up in an eventual 6–0 win at home to Taunton Town. On 22 November 2022, he opened the scoring with an overhead kick in a 3–1 win over Newport County. He followed that up four days later by again opening the scoring, this time in a 3–2 loss to Portsmouth in an FA Cup Second Round tie at Fratton Park. He scored 4 goals in 22 appearances in all competitions over the season as his side were relegated to EFL League Two, with Burns' last appearance of the season coming in February 2023.

==== 2023–24 season ====
On 21 November 2023, Burns made his first competitive appearance of the season, starting and scoring in a 3–2 win over Northampton Town in the EFL Trophy.

==== Shamrock Rovers loan ====
After making just two EFL Trophy appearances and no league appearances in the season, Burns was loaned out to Shamrock Rovers in search of game time on 2 January 2024. On 4 March 2024, Burns scored his first goal for the club in a 2–2 draw against Derry City.

=== Grimsby Town ===
On 26 January 2025, Burns signed for EFL League Two club Grimsby Town for an undisclosed fee on a contract until the summer of 2028, turning down a contract offer to join Shamrock Rovers on a permanent basis following his loan spell there. His first appearance for Grimsby came as a substitute, coming on in the 86th minute of their 2–1 win over Doncaster Rovers on 15 February 2025. On 27 August 2025, Burns assisted the opening goal of the game in a 2–2 draw at home to his boyhood club Manchester United in the EFL Cup, before going on to score 2 penalties in the shootout as his side won 12–11 on penalties, with his second spot kick proving to be the winner. On 27 November 2025, he scored his first goal for the club, a 67th minute equaliser in an eventual 2–1 loss at home to Tranmere Rovers.

=== Derry City ===
On 11 July 2026, Burns signed for League of Ireland Premier Division club Derry City for an undisclosed fee. On 8 November 2026, he scored the only goal of the game in a 1–0 win over Waterford in the 2026 FAI Cup final at the Aviva Stadium, his first goal for the club.

== International career ==
=== Northern Ireland ===
Born in Dublin, Burns was eligible to represent both Republic of Ireland as well as Northern Ireland at international level, whom he qualified to play for through his Belfast born father. Burns initially represented Northern Ireland U17 following unsuccessful requests to the FAI from his coaches at St Patrick's Athletic to call him up for the Republic of Ireland. His form with Northern Ireland led to an international callup from the Republic of Ireland U17 team who he made his debut for in a 1–1 draw with Turkey U17 in a friendly at Tallaght Stadium on 18 September 2018. 2 days later he scored against the same opposition in a 4–1 win. After not being called up by the Republic of Ireland for their next squad, Burns returned to Northern Ireland and scored his first goals for the country on 30 October 2018 by scoring 2 penalties in a 6–0 win away to San Marino. In November 2019 he scored the winning penalty for Northern Ireland U19 against Germany U19 in a preparation tournament for the UEFA European Under-19 Championship. Following Burns being capped by Northern Ireland in a competitive game it left him with only one change of international allegiance left with FIFA.

=== Republic of Ireland ===
In October 2021, Burns revealed he regularly attended the Aviva Stadium as a Republic of Ireland fan and Republic of Ireland U21 manager Jim Crawford revealed that Burns was in the process of changing his international allegiance to the country of his birth, stating "Darragh is keen to play, which is great news for myself and it's in the hands of legal at the minute. That's just standard procedure to get everything over the line, to change an association, and it can be a long process. He's done fantastic with Pat's. The sooner it happens the better. He's somebody that can go again for the next campaign. He's an exciting player to bring in, that's for sure." On 11 March 2022, it was announced that Burns had been called up to the Republic of Ireland U20 squad following the completion of his international allegiance change with FIFA. He made his return to a Republic of Ireland team on 22 March 2022 playing in a friendly against the Republic of Ireland Amateur side at Whitehall Stadium. The following day, he was added to the Republic of Ireland U21 squad for the first time, ahead of their 2023 UEFA European Under-21 Championship qualification match away to Sweden U21. Burns made his Republic of Ireland U21 debut on 16 June 2023, in a 2–2 draw with Ukraine U21 in a friendly played in Bad Blumau, Austria.

== Career statistics ==
As of match played on 8 November 2026

Appearances and goals by club, season and competition
Club	Season	League			National cup (Note: Includes FAI Cup & FA Cup)		League cup (Note: Includes League of Ireland Cup & EFL Cup)		Europe		Other		Total	
Club	Season	Division	Apps	Goals	Apps	Goals	Apps	Goals	Apps	Goals	Apps	Goals	Apps	Goals
St Patrick's Athletic	2019	LOI Premier Division	0	0	0	0	0	0	0 (Note: Appearances in the UEFA Europa League)	0	2 (Note: Appearances in the Leinster Senior Cup)	0	2	0
St Patrick's Athletic	2020	LOI Premier Division	6	0	0	0	—		—		—		6	0
St Patrick's Athletic	2021	LOI Premier Division	26	4	4	3	—		—		—		30	7
St Patrick's Athletic	2022	LOI Premier Division	22	4	0	0	—		0 (Note: Appearances in the UEFA Europa Conference League)	0	1 (Note: Appearance in the President of Ireland's Cup)	0	23	4
St Patrick's Athletic	Total		54	8	4	3	0	0	0	0	3	0	61	11
Milton Keynes Dons	2022–23	League One	14	0	2	2	3	1	—		3 (Note: Appearances in the EFL Trophy)	1	22	4
Milton Keynes Dons	2023–24	League Two	0	0	0	0	0	0	—		2	1	2	1
Milton Keynes Dons	2024–25	League Two	0	0	0	0	—		—		0	0	0	0
Milton Keynes Dons	Total		14	0	2	2	3	1	—		5	2	24	5
Shamrock Rovers (loan)	2024	LOI Premier Division	28	5	1	0	—		12 (Note: 4 appearances in the UEFA Champions League; 3 appearances in the UEFA Europa League; 5 appearances in the UEFA Conference League)	0	1	0	42	5
Grimsby Town	2024–25	League Two	9	0	—		—		—		—		9	0
Grimsby Town	2025–26	League Two	40	1	3	0	4	0	—		5 (Note: 3 appearances in the EFL Trophy; 2 appearances in the 2026 EFL League Two Playoffs)	0	52	1
Grimsby Town	Total		49	1	3	0	4	0	—		5	0	61	1
Derry City	2026	LOI Premier Division	10	0	5	1	—		2 (Note: Appearances in the UEFA Conference League)	0	—		17	1
Career total			155	14	15	6	7	1	14	0	17	2	205	23

== Honours ==
St Patrick's Athletic

- FAI Cup: 2021
- Leinster Senior Cup: 2018–19

Shamrock Rovers

- President of Ireland's Cup: 2024

Derry City

- FAI Cup: 2026

Individual

- St Patrick's Athletic Young Player of the Year: 2021
- St Patrick's Athletic Goal of the Season: 2021
