= Nahum Melvin-Lambert =

Saint Lucian footballer

Personal information
- Full name: Nahum Beres Job Melvin-Lambert
- Date of birth: 21 October 2002 (age 24)
- Place of birth: London, England
- Position: Striker

Team information
- Current team: Welling United

Youth career
- 2017–2020: Reading

Senior career*
Years	Team	Apps	(Gls)
2020–2023	Reading	0	(0)
2021	→ St Patrick's Athletic (loan)	5	(1)
2021	→ St Patrick's Athletic (loan)	11	(2)
2022	→ Hemel Hempstead Town (loan)	3	(1)
2023	→ Weymouth (loan)	6	(0)
2023–2024	Weymouth	1	(0)
2024	Sutton Common Rovers	8	(1)
2024–2025	Bishop's Stortford	16	(3)
2025–2026	Cheshunt	19	(4)
2026–	Welling United	2	(1)

International career^{‡}
2023–	Saint Lucia	1	(0)
- * Club domestic league appearances and goals as of 17:56, 14 August 2026 (UTC) ‡ National team caps and goals as of 22:34, 19 September 2023 (UTC)

Nahum Beres Job Melvin-Lambert (born 21 October 2002) is a Saint Lucian footballer who plays as a striker for Isthmian League Premier Division side Welling United. Born in England, he plays for the Saint Lucia national team.

== Club career ==
=== Early life ===
Melvin-Lambert grew up in London and attended the Mossbourne Community Academy in Hackney and was on trial with Fulham in 2015.

=== Reading ===
Melvin-Lambert signed for Reading's Academy in 2017, aged 14. He made his senior debut for Reading on 5 September 2020 as a substitute for Lucas João in a 3–1 EFL Cup victory over Colchester United at the Madejski Stadium. He made two further 2 appearances that season, a 1–0 loss at home to Luton Town in the following round of the EFL Cup on 15 September and another 1–0 defeat against the same opposition, this time in the FA Cup at Kenilworth Road on 9 January 2021. On 25 February 2021, Melvin-Lambert signed his first professional contract with Reading, until the summer of 2022, before being sent out on loan.

==== St Patrick's Athletic loans ====
On 25 February 2021, the same day that Melvin-Lambert signed his first professional contract with Reading, he was sent out on loan to League of Ireland Premier Division club St Patrick's Athletic until June 2021. Upon signing he was given the number 9 shirt. Due to the team's good start to the season, he had to wait until 9 April 2021 to make his debut for the club, coming off the bench in a 2–0 win over Derry City at Richmond Park. Melvin-Lambert's next appearance came on 8 May, coming off the bench for an injury time cameo in the Dublin derby against Shamrock Rovers. The first goal of his senior career came on 14 May 2021 when he came off the bench away to Drogheda United in the 79th minute and scored 3 minutes later. Melvin-Lambert returned to his parent club in June at the end of his loan deal. Upon returning to Reading, Melvin-Lambert took part in pre-season training with the first team squad and featured in friendlies against Lincoln City, West Ham United and Charlton Athletic. On 28 July 2021, Melvin-Lambert returned to St Patrick's Athletic on another loan, for the second half of the 2021 League of Ireland Premier Division season. He made his first start for the club on 8 August 2021 and opened the scoring in a 4–1 win for his side away to Dundalk at Oriel Park. He followed that up by scoring the winning goal 5 days later in a 2–1 victory over Waterford at Richmond Park. On 28 November 2021 Melvin-Lambert was an unused substitute in the 2021 FAI Cup Final, receiving his first medal at senior level as his side defeated rivals Bohemians 4–3 on penalties following a 1–1 draw after extra time in front of a record FAI Cup Final crowd of 37,126 at the Aviva Stadium.

==== Return from loan ====
On 7 May 2022, Melvin-Lambert scored 2 goals in a 4–0 win over Ascot United in the final of the Berks & Bucks Senior Cup. On 2 July 2022, Melvin-Lambert signed a new contract until the summer of 2023.

==== 2022–23 loans ====
On 12 September 2022, Melvin-Lambert joined National League South side Hemel Hempstead Town on a one-month youth loan deal. He made his debut on 14 September 2022 in a 3–1 loss away to Dulwich Hamlet. On 24 September 2022, he scored his first goal for the club, opening the scoring in a 1–1 draw against Worthing with a 28th minute penalty.

On 3 February 2023, Melvin-Lambert signed for Weymouth in the National League South on a one-month loan deal.

On 17 May 2023, it was announced that Melvin-Lambert would leave Reading in the summer of 2023, upon the expiry of his contract.

=== Non-League ===
On 11 August 2023, Weymouth announced the signing of Melvin-Lambert.

In August 2024, Melvin-Lambert joined Isthmian League South Central club Sutton Common Rovers. He departed the club in November 2024, later joining Bishop's Stortford

On 8 August 2025, Bishop's Stortford announced that Melvin-Lambert had signed a new contract with them for the 2025/26 season. On 3 December 2025, Bishop's Stortford announced that Melvin-Lambert had left the club after accepting an offer to join Isthmian Premier Division side Cheshunt.

On 8 August 2026, Melvin-Lambert joined Isthmian League Premier Division club Welling United.

== International career ==
On 2 June 2023, Melvin-Lambert was named in the Saint Lucia squad for the 2023 CONCACAF Gold Cup. On 16 June 2023, he made his international debut in a 3–1 defeat to Martinique in the 2023 CONCACAF Gold Cup preliminary round.

== Career statistics ==
=== Club ===
As of end of 2025–26 season

Appearances and goals by club, season and competition
Club	Season	League			National Cup (Note: Includes FA Cup & FAI Cup)		League Cup (Note: Includes EFL Cup & League of Ireland Cup)		Other		Total	
Club	Season	Division	Apps	Goals	Apps	Goals	Apps	Goals	Apps	Goals	Apps	Goals
Reading	2020–21	Championship	0	0	1	0	2	0	—		3	0
Reading	2021–22	Championship	0	0	0	0	—		—		0	0
Reading	2022–23	Championship	0	0	—		0	0	—		0	0
Reading	Total		0	0	1	0	2	0	—		3	0
St Patrick's Athletic (loan)	2021	LOI Premier Division	5	1	—		—		—		5	1
St Patrick's Athletic (loan)	2021	LOI Premier Division	11	2	1	0	—		—		12	2
St Patrick's Athletic (loan)	Total		16	3	1	0	—		—		17	3
Hemel Hempstead Town (loan)	2022–23	National League South	3	1	1	0	—		—		4	1
Weymouth (loan)	2022–23	National League South	6	0	—		—		—		6	0
Weymouth	2023–24	National League South	1	0	0	0	—		0	0	1	0
Sutton Common Rovers	2024–25	Isthmian League South Central Division	8	1	0	0	—		1 (Note: Appearance(s) in FA Trophy)	0	9	1
Bishop's Stortford	2024–25	Southern Football League Premier Division Central	3	0	0	0	—		0	0	3	0
Bishop's Stortford	2025–26	Southern Football League Premier Division Central	13	3	0	0	—		0	0	13	3
Bishop's Stortford	Total		16	3	0	0	—		0	0	16	3
Cheshunt	2025–26	Isthmian League Premier Division	19	4	0	0	—		0	0	19	4
Welling United	2026–27	Isthmian League Premier Division	0	0	0	0	—		0	0	0	0
Career total			69	12	3	0	2	0	1	0	75	12

=== International ===
As of match played 16 June 2023

National team	Year	Apps	Goals
Saint Lucia	2023	1	0
Total		1	0

== Honours ==
St Patrick's Athletic

- FAI Cup: 2021

Reading

- Berks & Bucks Senior Cup: 2021–22
