= Alfie Lewis =

English footballer

Personal information
- Full name: Alfie Lewis
- Date of birth: 28 September 1999 (age 27)
- Place of birth: Leigh-on-Sea, England
- Height: 1.76 m (5 ft 9 in)
- Position: Midfielder

Team information
- Current team: Braintree Town
- Number: 16

Youth career
- 2008–2017: West Ham United

Senior career*
| Years | Team | Apps | (Gls) |
| 2017–2021 | West Ham United | 0 | (0) |
| 2021 | → St Patrick's Athletic (loan) | 15 | (1) |
| 2021 | St Patrick's Athletic | 16 | (2) |
| 2022 | Plymouth Argyle | 1 | (0) |
| 2022–2023 | Dundalk | 37 | (1) |
| 2025 | Aveley | 18 | (1) |
| 2025–2026 | Kettering Town | 36 | (2) |
| 2026– | Braintree Town | 11 | (0) |
- * Club domestic league appearances and goals as of 16:48, 1 November 2026 (UTC)

Alfie Lewis (born 28 September 1999) is an English professional footballer who plays as a midfielder for National League South club Braintree Town. He has previously played for West Ham United, St Patrick's Athletic, Plymouth Argyle, Dundalk, Aveley and Kettering Town.

== Career ==
=== West Ham United ===
Raised in Leigh-on-Sea, Essex, Lewis attended local school Belfairs Academy. He grew up supporting Arsenal and joined the West Ham United Academy aged 8. In May 2017, Lewis began his first professional deal, signing a 3-year contract with the club until June 2020. He signed a 1-year contract extension in June 2020. On 1 July 2020, Lewis' first involvement in the first team matchday squad came, as he was an unused substitute in his side's 3–2 win over rivals Chelsea at the London Stadium. In February 2021, he was loaned to Irish side St Patrick's Athletic until the end of June. He was then released by West Ham after 13 years at the club following the expiration of his contract. He made a total of 12 appearances in the EFL Trophy for West Ham United U21 during his time at the club.

=== St Patrick's Athletic ===
On 23 February 2021, Lewis signed for League of Ireland Premier Division club St Patrick's Athletic on loan until 26 June 2021. He made his debut in senior football on 9 April 2021, coming on as a substitute for Chris Forrester in a 2–0 win over Derry City at Richmond Park. Lewis scored his first goal in senior football on 21 June 2021, scoring the final goal in a 4–1 win over Finn Harps to help his side to the top of the table. Following his release by West Ham United after the end of his contract, Lewis returned to Pat's on a permanent basis on 1 July 2021 on a deal until the end of the season. On 1 October 2021, he scored an injury time winner against Drogheda United, finding the top corner from the edge of the box to secure a 1–0 win at United Park. He scored his 3rd goal of the season on 29 October 2021 in a 4–1 win away to Longford Town, a result that confirmed UEFA Europa Conference League football for the following season, a goal that Lewis had set out to achieve upon returning to the club. On 28 November 2021 Lewis was in the starting XI in the 2021 FAI Cup Final, as his side defeated rivals Bohemians 4–3 on penalties following a 1–1 draw after extra time in front of a record FAI Cup Final crowd of 37,126 at the Aviva Stadium. During his time at the club, he received the nickname 'The Cockney Pirlo' from the Pat's fans, in reference to the legendary Italian midfielder Andrea Pirlo.

=== Plymouth Argyle ===
Lewis signed for EFL League One side Plymouth Argyle on 5 January 2022. He made his debut for the club three days later, coming on as a late substitute in extra time in a 1–0 win away to EFL Championship side Birmingham City at St Andrew's in the FA Cup Third Round. Lewis made his league debut for the club on 25 January 2022, coming off the bench in a 3–3 draw away to Fleetwood Town.

=== Dundalk ===
On 27 July 2022, it was announced that Lewis had returned to the League of Ireland Premier Division after just two appearances with Plymouth Argyle, linking up with his former St Patrick's Athletic manager Stephen O'Donnell at Dundalk for an undisclosed fee. He made a total of 42 appearances, scoring one goal in his season-and-a-half with the club, before leaving at the end of his contract at the end of November 2023.

=== Aveley ===
On 24 January 2025, after over a year without a club, Lewis joined National League South club Aveley.

=== Kettering Town ===
Lewis signed for Southern Football League Premier Division Central club Kettering Town in August 2025.

=== Braintree Town ===
On 10 July 2026, Lewis joined National League South side, Braintree Town following his departure from Kettering Town.

== Career statistics ==
As of match played on 31 October 2026

Appearances and goals by club, season and competition
| Club | Season | League | | | National Cup (Note: Includes FA Cup & FAI Cup) | | League Cup (Note: Includes EFL Cup & National League Cup) | | Other | | Total | |
| Club | Season | Division | Apps | Goals | Apps | Goals | Apps | Goals | Apps | Goals | Apps | Goals |
|---|---|---|---|---|---|---|---|---|---|---|---|---|
| West Ham United U21 | 2016–17 | — | — | | | | | | 3 (Note: Appearances in the EFL Trophy) | 0 | 3 | 0 |
| West Ham United U21 | 2017–18 | — | — | | | | | | 0 | 0 | 0 | 0 |
| West Ham United U21 | 2018–19 | — | — | | | | | | 3 | 0 | 3 | 0 |
| West Ham United U21 | 2019–20 | — | — | | | | | | 3 | 0 | 3 | 0 |
| West Ham United U21 | 2020–21 | — | — | | | | | | 3 | 0 | 3 | 0 |
| West Ham United U21 | Total | | — | | — | | — | | 12 | 0 | 12 | 0 |
| West Ham United | 2019–20 | Premier League | 0 | 0 | 0 | 0 | 0 | 0 | — | | 0 | 0 |
| West Ham United | 2020–21 | Premier League | 0 | 0 | 0 | 0 | 0 | 0 | — | | 0 | 0 |
| West Ham United | Total | | 0 | 0 | 0 | 0 | 0 | 0 | — | | 0 | 0 |
| St Patrick's Athletic (loan) | 2021 | LOI Premier Division | 15 | 1 | — | | — | | — | | 15 | 1 |
| St Patrick's Athletic | 2021 | LOI Premier Division | 16 | 2 | 5 | 0 | — | | — | | 21 | 2 |
| St Patrick's Athletic | Total | | 31 | 3 | 5 | 0 | — | | — | | 36 | 3 |
| Plymouth Argyle | 2021–22 | EFL League One | 1 | 0 | 1 | 0 | — | | — | | 2 | 0 |
| Dundalk | 2022 | LOI Premier Division | 12 | 1 | 2 | 0 | — | | — | | 14 | 1 |
| Dundalk | 2023 | LOI Premier Division | 25 | 0 | 1 | 0 | — | | 2 (Note: 1 appearance in the UEFA Europa Conference League & 1 appearance in the Leinster Senior Cup) | 0 | 28 | 0 |
| Dundalk | Total | | 37 | 1 | 3 | 0 | — | | 2 | 0 | 42 | 1 |
| Aveley | 2024–25 | National League South | 18 | 1 | — | | — | | — | | 18 | 1 |
| Kettering Town | 2025–26 | Southern Football League Premier Division Central | 36 | 2 | 2 | 0 | — | | 2 (Note: 1 appearance in the FA Trophy & 1 in the Southern Football League Premier Division Central play-offs) | 0 | 40 | 2 |
| Braintree Town | 2026–27 | National League South | 11 | 0 | 2 | 0 | 3 | 1 | 0 | 0 | 16 | 1 |
| Career total | | | 134 | 7 | 13 | 0 | 3 | 1 | 16 | 0 | 166 | 8 |

== Honours ==
St Patrick's Athletic

- FAI Cup (1): 2021
