= Ronan Coughlan =

Irish footballer (born 1996)

Personal information
- Full name: Ronan Liam Coughlan
- Date of birth: 2 October 1996 (age 30)
- Place of birth: Limerick, Ireland
- Height: 5 ft 10 in (1.78 m)
- Position: Striker

Team information
- Current team: Fleetwood Town
- Number: 19

Youth career
- 2001–2012: Mungret Regional
- 2012–2014: Limerick
- 2014–2017: Huddersfield Town

Senior career*
Years	Team	Apps	(Gls)
2018	Bray Wanderers	21	(4)
2018	Cork City	4	(1)
2019–2020	Sligo Rovers	45	(14)
2021–2022	St Patrick's Athletic	38	(7)
2023	Waterford	29	(33)
2024–	Fleetwood Town	56	(15)
- * Club domestic league appearances and goals as of 09:08, 18 October 2026 (UTC)

Ronan Liam Coughlan (born 2 October 1996) is an Irish professional footballer who plays as a striker for EFL League Two club Fleetwood Town.

He previously played for Bray Wanderers, Cork City, Sligo Rovers, St Patrick's Athletic and Waterford.

== Club career ==
=== Youth career ===
A native of Limerick, Coughlan played his schoolboy football with local side Mungret Regional. During his schoolboy career he was also a member of the Limerick Regional Emerging Talent Centre and won local league cups from under-11s to under-16s level and holds local league medals at both under 11s and under 12s. Coughlan represented Munster in the FAI U-17 Interprovincial Tournament in Wexford in 2012–13 season. He signed for Limerick's academy aged 16 and featured for their Under-17 & Under-19 sides. Coughlan moved to England in January 2014 aged 17, to train with Huddersfield Town while awaiting FIFA international clearance for a move to the club. On 10 July 2014, it was announced by the club that he had officially signed, initially joining their under 18 side. He quickly progressed into the under 21 side and signed his first professional contract in October 2014, a deal running to the summer of 2017. He was released by the club in the summer of 2017 at the end of his contract, following their promotion to the Premier League.

=== Bray Wanderers ===
In February 2018, it was announced that Coughlan had signed for League of Ireland Premier Division club Bray Wanderers. He made his debut in senior football on 9 February 2018, opening the scoring in a 1–1 draw with Drogheda United in a pre-season friendly at United Park. His competitive debut in senior football came on 16 February 2016, in a 0–0 draw away to champions, Dundalk at Oriel Park. Coughlan scored his first league goal on 16 April 2018 in a 1–0 win over Shamrock Rovers at the Carlisle Grounds. He was released at the start of the summer transfer window by Bray who were in financial difficulty and were looking to lower their wage bill. Coughlan made a total of 21 appearances for the club, scoring 4 goals.

=== Cork City ===
Coughlan signed for Cork City on 11 July 2018 until the end of the season. He scored his first goal for the club in a 5–0 league win over Derry City at Turners Cross on 23 July 2018. His first appearances in European football came in August 2018 when he came off the bench at home and away to Norwegian club Rosenborg BK in the UEFA Europa League. He scored 4 goals in 4 games in the club's FAI Cup campaign but remained an unused substitute in the 2018 FAI Cup Final at the Aviva Stadium as his side lost 2–1 to Dundalk, who had also pipped them to the league title. He made a total of 10 appearances for the club in all competitions, scoring 5 goals.

=== Sligo Rovers ===
On 14 February 2019, Coughlan signed for Sligo Rovers on a season long deal. He scored his first goal for the club with a 90th-minute penalty at home to Finn Harps on 26 April 2019. His first career hat-trick came in a 5–1 win over UCD on 1 July 2019. Over the 2019 season, he made 30 appearances in all competitions, scoring 10 goals. He extended his contract by another year in October 2019 to keep him at the club until the end of the 2020 season. On 9 November 2020, Coughlan scored an injury time goal to confirm a 2–0 win over Dundalk to secure UEFA Europa League football for his club. He scored 7 goals in 21 appearances in all competitions over the season. Coughlan announced on 22 December 2020 that he would be leaving the club.

=== St Patrick's Athletic ===
On 22 December 2020, it was announced that Coughlan had signed for Dublin club St Patrick's Athletic ahead of the 2021 season. On 3 April 2021, he scored the winning goal at Dalymount Park as his side beat Dublin rivals Bohemians for the first time in 9 games. He scored a penalty in a 2–0 win over his former club Sligo Rovers on 18 June 2021, in what was his club's first game with supporters in attendance in 470 days due to COVID-19 restrictions. On 28 November 2021 Coughlan scored his penalty in the 2021 FAI Cup Final penalty shootout, as his side defeated rivals Bohemians 4–3 on penalties following a 1–1 draw after extra time in front of a record FAI Cup Final crowd of 37,126 at the Aviva Stadium. His side finished in 2nd place, securing UEFA Europa Conference League football for the following season, as he scored 8 goals in 32 appearances through the year. Coughlan signed a new contract with the club on 1 January 2022. Coughlan's first goal of the season came on 31 July 2022 in an FAI Cup tie with Waterford in what was his first start in over 3 months following a hamstring injury. He made a total of 13 appearances in all competitions in 2022, scoring 1 goal in an injury plagued campaign.

=== Waterford ===
On 14 February 2023, it was announced that Coughlan had signed for League of Ireland First Division side Waterford. Coughlan's first goals for the club came on 18 March 2023, when he scored both his side's goals in a 2–2 draw with one of his former clubs, Bray Wanderers at the RSC. Coughlan was named League of Ireland Player of the Month for April 2023 after scoring 11 goals in 5 appearances during the month. On 10 November 2023, he scored the winning goal in the Play-Off Final in a 2–1 win over Cork City at Tallaght Stadium, to help his side to promotion to the League of Ireland Premier Division. He finished the season with 37 goals in 35 games in all competitions. On 28 December 2023, Waterford announced that Coughlan had left the club, despite their offers of contract extensions, in order to move to England.

=== Fleetwood Town ===
On 3 January 2024, Coughlan signed for EFL League One club Fleetwood Town on an 18-month contract. On 3 February 2024, he scored his first senior goal in English football, in a 3–0 win at home to Port Vale. On 25 January 2025, in the process of scoring his 10th goal of the season in all competitions, against Carlisle United, he snapped his Achilles tendon, with the injury set to keep him out of action for 9 months. In May 2025, while he was still out injured, the club opted to active the one-year-contract extension on his contract. On 7 October 2025, after 8 months out injured he made his return to action in a 4–0 win over Leeds United U21 in the EFL Trophy.

== Personal life ==
His brother Garbhan Coughlan is also a footballer, having played in the League of Ireland before moving to play in New Zealand.

== Career statistics ==
As of match played 17 October 2026

Appearances and goals by club, season and competition
Club	Season	League			National Cup (Note: Includes FAI Cup & FA Cup)		League Cup (Note: Includes League of Ireland Cup & EFL Cup)		Europe		Other		Total	
Club	Season	Division	Apps	Goals	Apps	Goals	Apps	Goals	Apps	Goals	Apps	Goals	Apps	Goals
Bray Wanderers	2018	LOI Premier Division	21	4	—		0	0	—		0	0	21	4
Cork City	2018	LOI Premier Division	4	1	4	4	—		2 (Note: Appearances in UEFA Europa League)	0	—		10	5
Sligo Rovers	2019	LOI Premier Division	27	8	3	2	0	0	—		—		30	10
Sligo Rovers	2020	LOI Premier Division	18	6	3	1	—		—		—		21	7
Sligo Rovers	Total		45	14	6	3	0	0	—		—		51	17
St Patrick's Athletic	2021	LOI Premier Division	28	7	4	1	—		—		—		32	8
St Patrick's Athletic	2022	LOI Premier Division	10	0	1	1	—		2 (Note: Appearances in UEFA Europa Conference League)	0	0	0	13	1
St Patrick's Athletic	Total		38	7	5	2	—		2	0	0	0	45	9
Waterford	2023	LOI First Division	29	33	2	1	—		—		4 (Note: Appearances in 2023 League of Ireland First Division Play-offs)	3	35	37
Fleetwood Town	2023–24	EFL League One	13	2	—		—		—		—		13	2
Fleetwood Town	2024–25	EFL League Two	23	8	1	0	2	1	—		1 (Note: Appearance(s) in the EFL Trophy)	1	27	10
Fleetwood Town	2025–26	EFL League Two	11	1	1	0	0	0	—		3	1	15	2
Fleetwood Town	2026–27	EFL League Two	9	4	0	0	2	0	—		2	1	13	5
Fleetwood Town	Total		56	15	2	0	4	1	—		6	3	68	19
Career total			193	74	19	10	4	1	4	0	10	6	230	91

== Honours ==
St Patrick's Athletic

- FAI Cup: 2021
