= 2021 FAI Cup final =

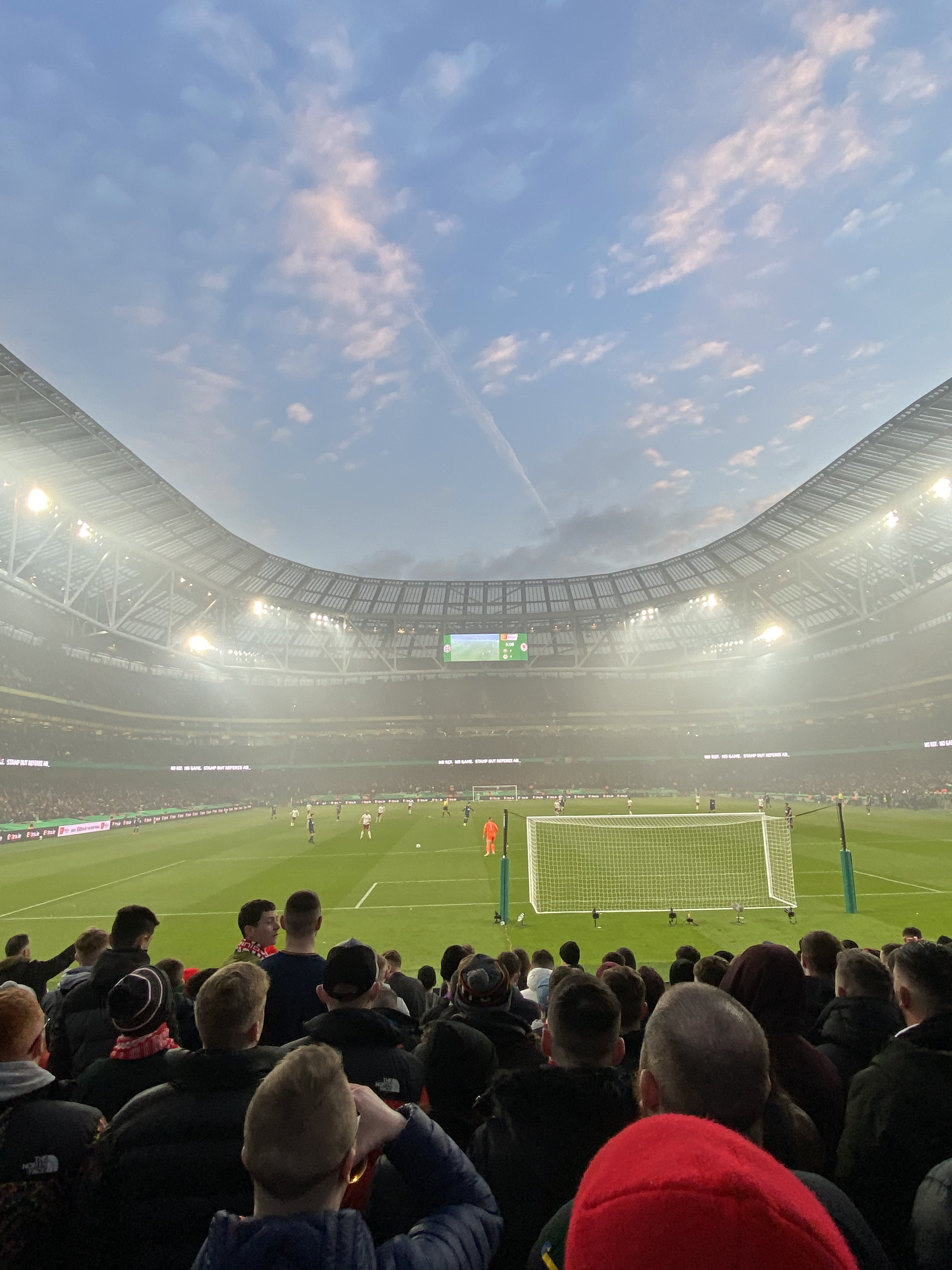
- Event: 2021 FAI Cup
St Patrick's Athletic	Bohemians
1	1
- After extra time St Pat's won 4–3 on penalties
- Date: 28 November 2021
- Venue: Aviva Stadium, Dublin
- Man of the Match: Lee Desmond (St Patrick's Athletic)
- Referee: Rob Hennessy
- Attendance: 37,126
- Weather: Clear; 4 °C (39 °F)

The 2021 FAI Cup final, known as the 2021 Extra.ie FAI Cup final for sponsorship reasons, was the final match of the 2021 FAI Cup, the national association football cup of the Republic of Ireland. The match took place on Sunday 28 November at the Aviva Stadium in Dublin, and was contested by St Patrick's Athletic and Bohemians. St Patrick's Athletic captained by Ian Bermingham won the game 4–3 on penalties after a 1–1 draw in which both Chris Forrester and Rory Feely scored against their former clubs.

== Prematch ==
St Patrick's Athletic were looking to win their fourth FAI Cup after winning in 1959, 1961, and 2014. Bohemians were looking to win their eight FAI Cup after winning in 1927–28, 1934–35, 1969–70, 1975–76, 1991–92, 2000–01, 2008. The final was the first since 2014 to not feature Dundalk who were looking to reach their seventh final in a row.

The match was broadcast live on RTÉ Two and RTÉ Two HD in the Republic of Ireland, and via the RTÉ Player worldwide.

== Match details ==
28 November 2021
16:00

St Patrick's Athletic	1–1 (a.e.t.)	Bohemians
Forrester 105+2'		Feely 107'
Penalties
Coughlan (penalty scored); King (penalty scored); Forrester (penalty missed); McClelland (penalty scored); Benson (penalty scored)	4–3	Devoy (penalty scored); Levingston (penalty scored); Mallon (penalty scored); Wilson (penalty missed); Ward (penalty missed)

Aviva Stadium, Dublin
Attendance: 37,126
Referee: Rob Hennessy

St Patrick's Athletic	Bohemians

GK	1	(Czech Republic) Vítězslav Jaroš
RB	4	(England) Sam Bone		(substituted off) 91'
CB	29	(Republic of Ireland) Paddy Barrett		(substituted off) 80'
CB	5	(Republic of Ireland) Lee Desmond	(yellow card) 100'
LB	3	(Republic of Ireland) Ian Bermingham (c)
CM	6	(Republic of Ireland) Jamie Lennon		(substituted off) 61'
CM	16	(England) Alfie Lewis		(substituted off) 97'
CM	7	(Republic of Ireland) Robbie Benson
RW	17	(Republic of Ireland) Darragh Burns	(yellow card) 37'
CF	8	(Republic of Ireland) Chris Forrester		105+2'
LW	12	(Scotland) Matty Smith		(substituted off) 75'
Substitutes:
GK	21	(Republic of Ireland) Barry Murphy
ST	9	(Malta) Kyrian Nwoko
ST	10	(Republic of Ireland) Ronan Coughlan		(substituted on) 97'
LW	11	(Republic of Ireland) Jason McClelland		(substituted on) 75'
RW	15	(Scotland) Billy King		(substituted on) 61'
ST	19	(Saint Lucia) Nahum Melvin-Lambert
LB	20	(Republic of Ireland) Shane Griffin
RB	22	(England) Jak Hickman		(substituted on) 91'
CB	39	(Republic of Ireland) James Abankwah		(substituted on) 80'
Manager:
(Republic of Ireland) Stephen O'Donnell

GK	1	(Republic of Ireland) James Talbot
RB	2	(Republic of Ireland) Andy Lyons
CB	5	(Republic of Ireland) Rob Cornwall
CB	6	(Republic of Ireland) Ciaran Kelly		(substituted off) 75'
LB	19	(Republic of Ireland) Tyreke Wilson
CM	28	(Republic of Ireland) Dawson Devoy
CM	16	(Republic of Ireland) Keith Buckley (c)	(yellow card) 90'	(substituted off) 106'
CM	26	(Republic of Ireland) Ross Tierney
RW	8	(Scotland) Ali Coote		(substituted off) 86'
ST	12	(Republic of Ireland) Georgie Kelly		(substituted off) 62'
LW	11	(Scotland) Liam Burt		(substituted off) 103'
Substitutes:
GK	25	(Republic of Ireland) Stephen McGuinness
LB	3	(Republic of Ireland) Anthony Breslin
RB	4	(Republic of Ireland) Rory Feely	(substituted on) 75'	107'
RW	7	(Northern Ireland) Stephen Mallon		(substituted on) 86'
LW	10	(Republic of Ireland) Keith Ward		(substituted on) 103'
CM	14	(Republic of Ireland) Conor Levingston		(substituted on) 106'
CB	18	(Republic of Ireland) James Finnerty
RW	20	(Republic of Ireland) Promise Omochere		(substituted on) 62'
CM	22	(Republic of Ireland) Jamie Mullins
Manager:
(Republic of Ireland) Keith Long
