= Sam Bone =

Malasyian footballer (born 1998)

Personal information
- Full name: Samuel Bone
- Date of birth: 24 August 1998 (age 28)
- Place of birth: Kuching, Malaysia
- Position: Centre-back

Team information
- Current team: Shelbourne
- Number: 15

Youth career
- –2016: Charlton Athletic

Senior career*
Years	Team	Apps	(Gls)
2017–2019	Shamrock Rovers	41	(2)
2019	→ Waterford (loan)	9	(0)
2020	Waterford	8	(1)
2021	St Patrick's Athletic	32	(1)
2022	Dundalk	16	(1)
2023–2024	Maidstone United	54	(5)
2024–	Shelbourne	42	(2)
- * Club domestic league appearances and goals as of 19:39, 10 November 2026 (UTC)

Samuel Bone (born 24th August 1998) is a Malaysian footballer who plays as a centre-back for League of Ireland Premier Division club Shelbourne.

== Early life ==
Bone was born in Malaysia but moved to England at the age of five. At 18 years old, he was diagnosed with testicular cancer and had surgery to have the cancer removed.

== Club career ==
As a youth player, Bone joined the youth academy of Charlton Athletic.

He started his career with Irish side Shamrock Rovers signing in February 2017 He made his League of Ireland debut on 24 March. During his time with The Hoops he played in four games in the UEFA Europa League.

In 2019, Bone signed for Waterford. Before the 2021 season, he signed for St Patrick's Athletic. Before the 2022 season, he signed for Irish top flight side Dundalk.

Before the second half of 2022–23, Bone signed for English fifth tier side Maidstone United. He stayed with the Stones for the 2023–24 season, and helped them reach the fifth round of the FA Cup.

== International career ==
Bone is eligible to represent Malaysia internationally, having been born there.

== Style of play ==
Bone mainly operates as a centre-back but has played as a full-back and as a midfielder during his stint with Dundalk.

== Personal life ==
Bone is the son of English professional footballer Billy Bone, who played in Malaysia and Singapore. He has been a supporter of English Premier League side Chelsea.

== Career statistics ==
As of match played 23 October 2026

Appearances and goals by club, season and competition
Club	Season	League			National cup		League cup		Europe		Other		Total	
Club	Season	Division	Apps	Goals	Apps	Goals	Apps	Goals	Apps	Goals	Apps	Goals	Apps	Goals
Shamrock Rovers	2017	LOI Premier Division	16	0	0	0	2	0	2 (Note: Appearances in the UEFA Europa League)	0	0	0	20	0
Shamrock Rovers	2018	LOI Premier Division	20	2	0	0	1	0	2	0	0	0	23	2
Shamrock Rovers	2019	LOI Premier Division	5	0	0	0	1	0	0	0	0	0	6	0
Shamrock Rovers	Total		41	2	0	0	4	0	4	0	0	0	49	2
Waterford (loan)	2019	LOI Premier Division	9	0	1	0	—		—		0	0	10	0
Waterford	2020	LOI Premier Division	8	1	1	0	—		—		—		9	1
St Patrick's Athletic	2021	LOI Premier Division	32	1	3	1	—		—		—		35	2
Dundalk	2022	LOI Premier Division	32	1	2	0	—		—		—		34	1
Maidstone United	2022–23	National League	18	2	—		—		—		3 (Note: Appearances in the FA Trophy)	0	21	2
Maidstone United	2023–24	National League South	36	2	5	0	—		—		1	0	42	3
Maidstone United	Total		54	5	5	0	—		—		4	0	63	5
Shelbourne	2024	LOI Premier Division	4	0	3	0	—		4 (Note: Appearances in the UEFA Conference League)	0	—		11	0
Shelbourne	2025	LOI Premier Division	15	1	1	0	—		5 (Note: 1 appearance in the UEFA Champions League; 2 appearances, 1 goal in the UEFA Europa League; 2 appearances in the UEFA Conference League)	1	1 (Note: Appearance in the President of Ireland's Cup)	0	22	2
Shelbourne	2026	LOI Premier Division	23	1	1	0	—		3	0	0	0	27	1
Shelbourne	Total		42	2	5	0	—		12	1	1	0	60	3
Career total			218	12	17	1	4	0	16	1	5	0	260	14

== Honours ==
St Patrick's Athletic

- FAI Cup: 2021

Shelbourne

- League of Ireland Premier Division: 2024
