= Kosovar Sadiki =

Footballer (born 1998)

Personal information
- Date of birth: 27 August 1998 (age 28)
- Place of birth: Moers, Germany
- Height: 1.95 m (6 ft 5 in)
- Position: Centre-back

Team information
- Current team: Ferizaj
- Number: 42

Youth career
- –2015: Kitchener SC
- 2015–2018: Stoke City
- 2016: → Stafford Town (loan)

Senior career*
Years	Team	Apps	(Gls)
2018–2019	Lokomotiva Zagreb	0	(0)
2019–2020	Hibernian	0	(0)
2020	→ Finn Harps (loan)	4	(0)
2020–2021	Finn Harps	42	(1)
2022–2024	Virtus Entella	51	(1)
2024–2025	Team Altamura	9	(0)
2026–	Ferizaj	11	(0)

International career^{‡}
2015	Canada U17	4	(2)
2017	Canada U20	2	(0)
2018	Canada U23	1	(0)
- * Club domestic league appearances and goals as of 22 June 2026 ‡ National team caps and goals as of 31 May 2018

Kosovar Sadiki (born 27 August 1998) is a professional soccer player who plays as a centre-back for Kosovo Superleague club Ferizaj. Born in Germany, he represented Canada at youth international level.

== Club career ==
=== Finn Harps ===
==== Period on loan ====
On 23 January 2020, Sadiki was loaned out to League of Ireland Premier Division club Finn Harps until the end of the 2020 season. On 14 February 2020, he made his debut in a 1–0 home win against Sligo Rovers after being named in the starting line-up.

==== Return as a permanent player ====
In July 2020, Sadiki returned to League of Ireland Premier Division club Finn Harps after being released from his parent club, Hibernian. On 1 August 2020, he made his debut against Shamrock Rovers after being named in the starting line-up and assists in his side's only goal during a 3–1 away defeat.

=== Virtus Entella ===
On 4 January 2022, Sadiki signed a multi-year contract with Serie C club Virtus Entella. Eighteen days later, he was named as a Virtus Entella substitute for the first time in a league match against Gubbio. His debut with Virtus Entella came eleven days later in a 5–1 home win against Montevarchi after being named in the starting line-up.

== International career ==
From 2015, until 2018, Sadiki has been part of Canada at youth international level, respectively has been part of the U17, U20 and U23 teams and he with these teams played seven matches and scored two goals. He also played in the 2015 CONCACAF U-17 Championship, 2017 CONCACAF U-20 Championship, and 2018 Toulon Tournament.

== Personal life ==
Sadiki was born in Moers, Germany and raised in Kitchener, Ontario, Canada to a Kosovo Albanian father from Ferizaj and a Macedonian Albanian mother from Skopje. He holds Canadian, Kosovan, Albanian, German and Swedish passports.
