= Stephen O'Donnell (Irish footballer) =

Irish footballer & manager (born 1986)

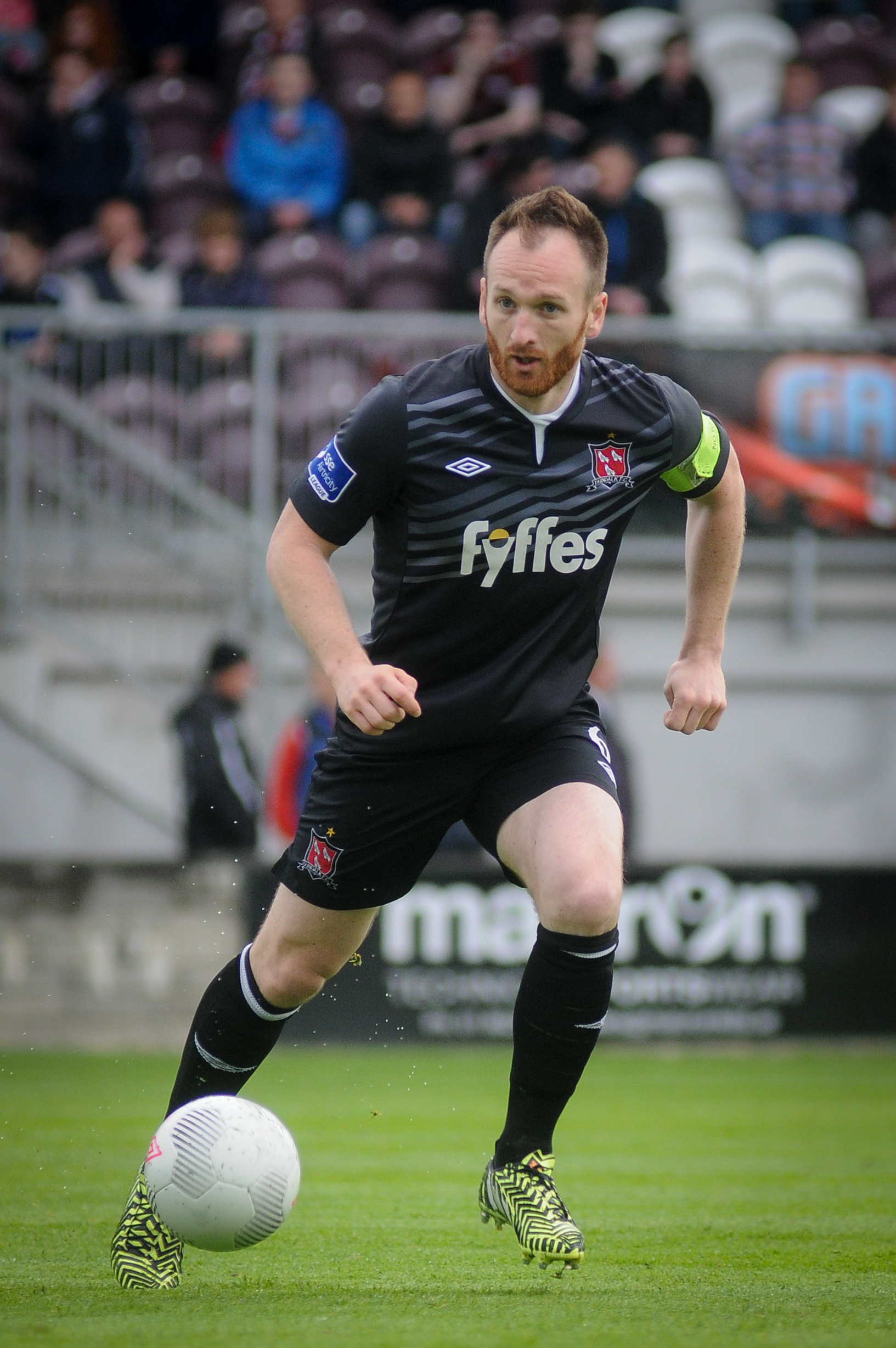
- O'Donnell in action for Dundalk in 2015

Personal information
- Date of birth: 15 January 1986 (age 40)
- Place of birth: Galway, Ireland
- Position: Midfielder

Team information
- Current team: Derry City (manager)

Youth career
- 2002–2004: Arsenal

Senior career*
Years	Team	Apps	(Gls)
2003–2005	Arsenal	0	(0)
2005–2007	Falkirk	46	(3)
2007–2008	Bohemians	38	(4)
2009	Cork City	20	(0)
2010	Galway United	26	(8)
2011–2012	Shamrock Rovers	16	(2)
2013–2018	Dundalk	111	(10)
Total		257	(27)

International career
2002–2003	Republic of Ireland U17		
2006	Republic of Ireland U21		
2008–2010	Republic of Ireland U23	3	(0)

Managerial career
- 2019–2021: St Patrick's Athletic
- 2021–2024: Dundalk
- 2026–: Derry City
- * Club domestic league appearances and goals

Stephen O'Donnell (born 15 January 1986) is an Irish professional football coach and former player who is the current manager of League of Ireland Premier Division side Derry City. During his playing career the clubs he played at were Arsenal, Falkirk, Bohemians, Cork City, Galway United, Shamrock Rovers and Dundalk.

== Club career ==
=== Arsenal ===
O'Donnell played youth football for Newcastle in County Galway before joining Arsenal as a trainee in the summer of 2002 after completing his Junior Certificate exams. He signed a professional contract at the club in January 2003 but left again in July 2005 without making an appearance for the first team. While he credits the coaching he received during this time with giving him greater confidence on the ball, he has expressed regret at moving to Arsenal at such a young age, feeling that if given the choice again he would have stayed at home, completed his Leaving Certificate exams and joined a team in the League of Ireland.

=== Falkirk ===
O'Donnell signed for Falkirk in August 2005 in search of more first-team opportunities and became a regular in their team, mostly playing on the left-side of midfield. He had a greater desire to be played centrally in his natural position, and after receiving no assurances about this from manager John Hughes, O'Donnell rejected a new contract in summer 2007.

=== Return to Ireland ===
O'Donnell was signed by Sean Connor on an 18-month deal for Bohemians in August 2007. He became a regular starter in the first team, which included scoring against Rhyl in the 2008 UEFA Intertoto Cup, but decided to move on after one season at Dalymount Park.

Having rejected a new contract offer, he signed a two-year deal with Cork City on 21 February 2009.

He signed for his local club, Galway United, in the weeks leading up to the 2010 League of Ireland season. He made 28 appearances for Galway scoring eight goals.

=== Shamrock Rovers ===
In January 2011, O'Donnell signed for the League of Ireland champions, Shamrock Rovers.

On 22 February 2011, O'Donnell scored in his first match for the Shamrock against Dundalk in the Leinster Senior Cup.

In August 2011, he scored the winning goal from a penalty at Partizan Belgrade as Rovers became the first Irish club to reach the group stages of the UEFA Europa League. O'Donnell missed a penalty against Rubin Kazan in the first game of the group stage. Prior to the match, he was involved in an attempt by senior players to secure a bigger bonus from the fan-owned club by threatening not to play the game.

=== Dundalk ===
He signed for Dundalk on 21 December 2012.

O'Donnell suffered a very serious injury while playing for Dundalk against former club Shamrock Rovers on 18 April 2014. A scan revealed that he tore his anterior cruciate ligament and his posterior cruciate ligament and would be out for the remainder of the season.

On 24 October 2014, O'Donnell scored the first goal in the 48th minute of Dundalk's 2–0 win over Cork City in the final match of the season. As a result, Dundalk were crowned premier league champions for the first time in 19 years, winning the league by two points over Cork City who led going into the match. It was O'Donnell's first start since returning from injury and he was awarded man of the match after an impressive display.

The club captain went on to play a prominent role in title wins in 2015 and 2016. Dundalk's three-in-a-row achievement was enhanced as they achieved it despite a bruising fixture schedule brought about by qualification for the group stages of the Europa League. O'Donnell signed a new two-year contract before the 2017 season but it ended in disappointment with rivals Cork City completing a League and Cup double. He announced his retirement from football in January 2019.

=== International ===
O'Donnell has been capped by the Republic of Ireland national under-21 football team and the under-23s.

== Managerial career ==
After retiring in January 2019, O'Donnell was immediately hired as a Senior Opposition Analyst & Scout at Dundalk. O'Donnell was announced as the head coach of St Patrick's Athletic on a two-year contract on 31 August 2019, his first job in senior management, following the resignation of Harry Kenny. He brought in his former Arsenal and Falkirk teammate Pat Cregg as his assistant. His first game in management came on 6 September 2019 as his Pat's side came from behind to win 2−1 away to Finn Harps thanks to goals from Darragh Markey and substitute Rhys McCabe. On 28 November 2021, O'Donnell led his side to victory in the 2021 FAI Cup Final, defeating rivals Bohemians 4–3 on penalties following a 1–1 draw after extra time in front of a record FAI Cup Final crowd of 37,126 at the Aviva Stadium. O'Donnell left the club in controversial circumstances in December 2021, returning to his former club Dundalk as head coach on a 2-year contract. A High Court action was filed against him by the holding company behind Pat's. On 8 April 2024, O'Donnell was sacked by Dundalk, with his side bottom of the table and without a win from their first 8 games of the season, having scored just 3 goals and conceding 15 in the process. On 8 May 2024, O'Donnell was announced as assistant manager of Bohemians, under recently appointed manager Alan Reynolds. On 18 November 2026, he was named as the new manager of League of Ireland Premier Division club and recent FAI Cup winners Derry City.

== Playing statistics ==
Appearances and goals by club, season and competition
Club	Season	League			National cup		League cup		Europe		Other		Total	
Club	Season	Division	Apps	Goals	Apps	Goals	Apps	Goals	Apps	Goals	Apps	Goals	Apps	Goals
Arsenal	2002–03	Premier League	0	0	0	0	0	0	0 (Note: Appearances in the UEFA Champions League)	0	—		0	0
Arsenal	2003–04	Premier League	0	0	0	0	0	0	0	0	—		0	0
Arsenal	2004–05	Premier League	0	0	0	0	0	0	0	0	—		0	0
Arsenal	Total		0	0	0	0	0	0	0	0	0	0	0	0
Falkirk	2005–06	Scottish Premier League	24	1	0	0	1	0	—		—		25	1
Falkirk	2006–07	Scottish Premier League	22	2	1	0	3	0	—		—		26	2
Falkirk	Total		46	3	1	0	4	0	0	0	0	0	51	3
Bohemians	2007	LOI Premier Division	12	4	1	0	1	0	—		—		14	4
Bohemians	2008	LOI Premier Division	26	0	4	0	1	0	4 (Note: Appearances in UEFA Intertoto Cup)	1	—		35	1
Bohemians	Total		38	4	5	0	2	0	4	1	0	0	49	5
Cork City	2009	LOI Premier Division	20	0	1	0	0	0	—		1 (Note: Appearances in Setanta Sports Cup)	0	22	0
Galway United	2010	LOI Premier Division	26	8	4	0	0	0	—		1 (Note: Appearances in League of Ireland promotion/relegation playoff)	0	31	8
Shamrock Rovers	2011	LOI Premier Division	12	2	3	0	0	0	9 (Note: Two appearances in the UEFA Champions League; seven appearances, one goal in the UEFA Europa League)	1	4 (Note: Two appearances, one goal in the Leinster Senior Cup; two appearances in the Setanta Sports Cup)	1	28	4
Shamrock Rovers	2012	LOI Premier Division	4	0	1	1	1	0	1	0	4 (Note: Three appearances in the Leinster Senior Cup; one appearance in the Setanta Sports Cup)	0	11	1
Shamrock Rovers	Total		16	2	4	1	1	0	10	1	8	1	39	5
Dundalk	2013	LOI Premier Division	22	3	3	1	0	0	—		2 (Note: Appearances in the Leinster Senior Cup)	0	28	4
Dundalk	2014	LOI Premier Division	12	2	0	0	0	0	0 (Note: Appearances in the UEFA Europa League)	0	5 (Note: One appearance in the Leinster Senior Cup; four appearances, one goal in the Setanta Sports Cup)	1	17	3
Dundalk	2015	LOI Premier Division	24	2	2	0	1	0	2	0	2	1	31	3
Dundalk	2016	LOI Premier Division	23	1	2	0	0	0	9 (Note: Five appearances in the UEFA Champions League; four appearances in the UEFA Europa League)	0	1 (Note: Appearances in the President of Ireland's Cup)	0	35	1
Dundalk	2017	LOI Premier Division	20	1	5	1	3	0	1	0	2 (Note: One appearance in the President of Ireland's Cup; one appearance in the Leinster Senior Cup)	0	31	2
Dundalk	2018	LOI Premier Division	10	1	0	0	1	0	0	0	0	0	11	1
Dundalk	Total		111	10	12	2	5	0	12	0	12	2	152	14
Career total			257	27	27	3	12	0	26	2	22	3	344	35

== Managerial statistics ==
Competitive games only – correct as of 5 April 2024.

Managerial record by team and tenure
Team	From	To	Record							
Team	From	To	G	W	D	L	GF	GA	GD	Win %
St Patrick's Athletic	31 August 2019	11 December 2021	70	33	17	20	97	72	+25	47.14
Dundalk	11 December 2021	8 April 2024	111	54	29	28	169	122	+47	48.65
Total			181	87	46	48	266	194	+72	48.07

== Honours ==
=== Player ===
Bohemians

- League of Ireland Premier Division: 2008
- FAI Cup: 2008

Shamrock Rovers

- League of Ireland Premier Division: 2011
- Setanta Sports Cup: 2011

Dundalk

- League of Ireland Premier Division: 2014, 2015, 2016, 2018
- FAI Cup: 2015, 2018
- EA Sports Cup: 2014, 2017
- Leinster Senior Cup: 2014–15

Individual

- PFAI Team of the Year: 2015, 2016

=== Manager ===
St Patrick's Athletic

- FAI Cup: 2021
- Leinster Senior Cup: 2019
