= 2022 President of Ireland's Cup =

- Event: President's Cup
Shamrock Rovers	St Patrick's Athletic
1	1
- Shamrock Rovers won 5–4 on penalties
- Date: 11 February 2022
- Venue: Tallaght Stadium, Tallaght
- Attendance: 5,426

The 2022 President's Cup was the eighth President's Cup contested for. The match was played on 11 February between the champions of the 2021 League of Ireland Premier Division and the 2021 FAI Cup winners, Shamrock Rovers and St Patrick's Athletic.

== Match ==
=== Summary ===
St Patrick's Athletic had the better of the chances with Eoin Doyle and Mark Doyle both missing two good chances in the first half before Eoin Doyle opened the scoring in the 50th minute, finishing from 5 yards after Shamrock Rovers goalkeeper Alan Mannus parried Jamie Lennon's volley. The home side were level in the 67th minute when Ronan Finn capitalised on a goalkeeping error from Pat's debutant Joseph Anang who spilled a cross straight into the path of Rovers captain. The score remained level after 90 minutes and Chris Forrester had his penalty saved by Mannus in the shootout to seal the trophy for the home side after all other penalties for both sides were scored.

=== Details ===
11 February 2022
20:00 GMT

Shamrock Rovers	1–1	St Patrick's Athletic
Ronan Finn 67'	Report	Eoin Doyle 50'
Penalties
Richie Towell (penalty scored); Graham Burke (penalty scored); Seán Hoare (penalty scored); Gary O'Neill (penalty scored); Jack Byrne (penalty scored)	5–4	Eoin Doyle (penalty scored); Mark Doyle (penalty scored); Chris Forrester (penalty missed); Tunde Owolabi (penalty scored); Adam O'Reilly (penalty scored)

Tallaght Stadium
Attendance: 5,426
Referee: Rob Harvey

Shamrock Rovers	St Patrick's Athletic

GK	1	(Northern Ireland) Alan Mannus
RWB	2	(Republic of Ireland) Ronan Finn (c)	67'	(substituted off) 82'
CB	2	(Republic of Ireland) Sean Gannon
CB	3	(Republic of Ireland) Seán Hoare
CB	5	(Republic of Ireland) Lee Grace
LWB	23	(Republic of Ireland) Neil Farrugia
CM	7	(Republic of Ireland) Dylan Watts	(substituted off) 63'
CM	16	(Republic of Ireland) Gary O'Neill
RW	29	(Republic of Ireland) Jack Byrne
ST	38	(Republic of Ireland) Aidomo Emakhu	(substituted off) 63'
LW	14	(Republic of Ireland) Danny Mandroiu	(substituted off) 63'
Substitutes:
GK	25	(Germany) Leon Pöhls
CB	4	(Cape Verde) Roberto Lopes
RWB	6	(Republic of Ireland) Barry Cotter	(substituted on) 82'
RW	10	(Republic of Ireland) Graham Burke	(substituted on) 63'
CM	17	(Republic of Ireland) Richie Towell	(substituted on) 63'
ST	20	(Republic of Ireland) Rory Gaffney	(substituted on) 63'
CB	24	(Republic of Ireland) Sean Carey
CM	26	(Republic of Ireland) Chris McCann
ST	34	(Republic of Ireland) Conan Noonan
Manager:
(Republic of Ireland) Stephen Bradley

GK	1	(Ghana) Joseph Anang
RB	2	(Northern Ireland) Jack Scott
CB	4	(Republic of Ireland) Joe Redmond
CB	20	(Republic of Ireland) James Abankwah	(substituted off) 76'
LB	19	(Republic of Ireland) Anthony Breslin
CM	6	(Republic of Ireland) Jamie Lennon	(substituted off) 86'
CM	8	(Republic of Ireland) Chris Forrester (c)
CAM	15	(Scotland) Billy King	(substituted off) 60'
RW	17	(Republic of Ireland) Darragh Burns	(substituted off) 76'
ST	9	(Republic of Ireland) Eoin Doyle	50'
LW	14	(Republic of Ireland) Mark Doyle
Substitutes:
GK	25	(Republic of Ireland) Josh Keeley
LB	3	(Republic of Ireland) Ian Bermingham
CB	5	(England) Tom Grivosti	(substituted on) 76'
LW	11	(Republic of Ireland) Jason McClelland	(substituted on) 86'
CM	16	(Republic of Ireland) Adam O'Reilly	(substituted on) 60'
CAM	18	(Republic of Ireland) Ben McCormack
CM	31	(Republic of Ireland) Kian Corbally
ST	33	(Republic of Ireland) Kyle Robinson
ST	45	(Belgium) Tunde Owolabi	(substituted on) 76'
Manager:
(Republic of Ireland) Tim Clancy

== See also ==
- 2022 League of Ireland Premier Division
- 2022 FAI Cup
- 2022 St Patrick's Athletic F.C. season
