= 2022 St Patrick's Athletic F.C. season =

St Patrick's Athletic F.C.
2022 season
- Chairman: Garrett Kelleher
- Manager: Tim Clancy
- Stadium: Richmond Park, Inchicore, Dublin 8
- League of Ireland Premier Division: 4th
- FAI Cup: First Round (knocked out by Waterford)
- UEFA Europa Conference League: Third Qualifying Round (knocked out by CSKA Sofia)
- President of Ireland's Cup: Runners-up (to Shamrock Rovers)
- Top goalscorer: League: Eoin Doyle – 14 goals All: Eoin Doyle – 15 goals
- Highest home attendance: 6,760 vs CSKA Sofia (11 August)
- Lowest home attendance: 1,900 (Est.) vs Sligo Rovers (14 August)
Home colours	Away colours

The 2022 season was St Patrick's Athletic F.C.'s 93rd year in existence and was the Supersaint's 71st consecutive season in the top-flight of Irish football. It was the first season in charge for manager Tim Clancy, having taken over from Stephen O'Donnell in December 2021. Pre-season training for the squad began in December 2021. The fixtures were released on 20 December 2021, with Pat's down to play rivals Shelbourne on the opening night of the season. In addition to the league and defence of their FAI Cup title, the club also competed in the UEFA Europa Conference League and the President of Ireland's Cup.

== Squad ==
No.	Name	Position(s)	Nationality	Hometown	Date of birth (age)	Previous club	Year signed	Club apps.	Club goals
Goalkeepers
1	Joseph Anang	GK	(Ghana)	Teshie, Accra	8 June 2000 (age 26)	(England) West Ham United	2022	30	0
21	Danny Rogers	GK	(Republic of Ireland)	New York City, United States	23 March 1994 (age 32)	(England) Oldham Athletic	2022	10	0
23	David Odumosu	GK	(Republic of Ireland)	Dundalk, County Louth	23 March 2001 (age 25)	(Republic of Ireland) Drogheda United	2022	2	0
25	Josh Keeley	GK	(Republic of Ireland)	Dunboyne, County Meath	17 May 2003 (age 23)	(Republic of Ireland) St Patrick's Athletic Academy	2020	2	0
36	Sean Molloy	GK	(Republic of Ireland)	Dublin	2 August 2004 (age 22)	(Republic of Ireland) St Patrick's Athletic Academy	2022	0	0
Defenders
2	Jack Scott	RB	(Northern Ireland)	Tandragee, County Armagh	22 September 2002 (age 24)	(England) Wolverhampton Wanderers	2022	17	1
2	Barry Cotter	RB	(Republic of Ireland)	Ennis, County Clare	4 December 1998 (age 27)	(Republic of Ireland) Shamrock Rovers	2022	16	2
3	Ian Bermingham (Captain)	LB/CB	(Republic of Ireland)	Ballyfermot, Dublin	16 June 1989 (age 37)	(Republic of Ireland) Shamrock Rovers	2010	455	16
4	Joe Redmond	CB	(Republic of Ireland)	Tallaght, Dublin	21 January 2000 (age 26)	(Republic of Ireland) Drogheda United	2022	42	1
5	Tom Grivosti	CB	(England)	West Derby, Liverpool	15 June 1999 (age 27)	(Scotland) Ross County	2022	36	2
12	Harry Brockbank	RB/CB	(England)	Bolton, Greater Manchester	26 September 1998 (age 28)	(United States) El Paso Locomotive	2022	15	0
19	Anthony Breslin	LB	(Republic of Ireland)	Blanchardstown, Dublin	13 February 1997 (age 29)	(Republic of Ireland) Bohemians	2022	38	2
20	James Abankwah	CB/RB	(Republic of Ireland)	Waterford	16 January 2004 (age 22)	(Republic of Ireland) St Patrick's Athletic Academy	2021	25	0
22	Sam Curtis	RB/CB	(Republic of Ireland)	Navan, County Meath	1 December 2005 (age 20)	(Republic of Ireland) St Patrick's Athletic Academy	2021	21	0
24	Ben Curtis	CB	(Republic of Ireland)	Navan, County Meath	27 March 2004 (age 22)	(Republic of Ireland) St Patrick's Athletic Academy	2022	0	0
28	Cian Kelly	CB	(Republic of Ireland)	Tallaght, Dublin	4 March 2002 (age 24)	(Republic of Ireland) St Patrick's Athletic Academy	2019	1	0
29	Paddy Barrett	CB	(Republic of Ireland)	Waterford	23 July 1993 (age 33)	(Cambodia) Preah Khan Reach Svay Rieng	2021	35	1
Midfielders
6	Jamie Lennon	CDM/CM	(Republic of Ireland)	Santry, Dublin	9 May 1998 (age 28)	(Republic of Ireland) St Patrick's Athletic Academy	2017	137	1
7	Serge Atakayi	RW/ST	(Finland)	(Democratic Republic of the Congo) Kinshasa, DR Congo	30 January 1999 (age 27)	(Finland) SJK	2022	17	5
8	Chris Forrester	CM/CAM	(Republic of Ireland)	Smithfield, Dublin	17 December 1992 (age 33)	(Scotland) Aberdeen	2019	289	62
11	Jason McClelland	LW/LB	(Republic of Ireland)	Templeogue, Dublin	5 March 1997 (age 29)	(Republic of Ireland) UCD	2020	66	4
14	Mark Doyle	LW/ST	(Republic of Ireland)	Skerries, County Dublin	19 November 1998 (age 27)	(Republic of Ireland) Drogheda United	2022	35	5
15	Billy King	LW/RW/CAM	(Scotland)	Portobello, Edinburgh	12 May 1994 (age 32)	(Scotland) Greenock Morton	2020	89	15
16	Adam O'Reilly	CM	(Republic of Ireland)	Mahon, Cork	11 May 2001 (age 25)	(England) Preston North End	2022	40	2
17	Darragh Burns	RW	(Republic of Ireland)	Stamullen, County Meath	8 June 2002 (age 24)	(Republic of Ireland) St Patrick's Athletic Academy	2019	61	11
18	Ben McCormack	CAM	(Republic of Ireland)	Harmonstown, County Dublin	4 April 2003 (age 23)	(Republic of Ireland) St Patrick's Athletic Academy	2019	46	3
25	Thijs Timmermans	CM	(Netherlands)	Hazerswoude-Dorp, Alphen aan den Rijn	25 July 1998 (age 28)	(Cyprus) PAEEK	2022	10	0
30	Ross Fay	CM	(Republic of Ireland)	East Wall, Dublin	22 January 2003 (age 23)	(Republic of Ireland) St Patrick's Athletic Academy	2021	0	0
31	Kian Corbally	CM	(Republic of Ireland)	Palmerstown, County Dublin	31 December 2003 (age 22)	(Republic of Ireland) St Patrick's Athletic Academy	2019	4	1
32	Darius Lipsiuc	LW/RW	(Republic of Ireland)	Dunboyne, Meath	16 September 2005 (age 21)	(Republic of Ireland) St Patrick's Athletic Academy	2022	1	0
34	Adam Murphy	CM	(Republic of Ireland)	Donnycarney, Dublin	8 April 2005 (age 21)	(Republic of Ireland) St Patrick's Athletic Academy	2021	4	0
35	Anthony Dodd	CM	(Republic of Ireland)	Dublin	19 February 2006 (age 20)	(Republic of Ireland) St Patrick's Athletic Academy	2022	0	0
Forwards
9	Eoin Doyle	ST	(Republic of Ireland)	Firhouse, Dublin	12 March 1988 (age 38)	(England) Bolton Wanderers	2022	42	15
10	Ronan Coughlan	ST	(Republic of Ireland)	Limerick	2 October 1996 (age 30)	(Republic of Ireland) Sligo Rovers	2021	45	9
33	Kyle Robinson	ST	(Republic of Ireland)	Lucan, County Dublin	8 November 2002 (age 24)	(Republic of Ireland) St Patrick's Athletic Academy	2019	10	3
45	Tunde Owolabi	ST	(Belgium)	Antwerp, Flemish Region	26 July 1995 (age 31)	(Republic of Ireland) Finn Harps	2022	32	5

=== Transfers ===
==== Transfers in ====
Date	Position	Nationality	Name	From	Fee	Ref.
18 December 2021	LB	(Republic of Ireland)	Anthony Breslin	(Republic of Ireland) Bohemians	Free transfer	
18 December 2021	LW	(Republic of Ireland)	Mark Doyle	(Republic of Ireland) Drogheda United	Undisclosed fee	
18 December 2021	CB	(Republic of Ireland)	Joe Redmond	(Republic of Ireland) Drogheda United	Free transfer	
24 December 2021	ST	(Belgium)	Tunde Owolabi	(Republic of Ireland) Finn Harps	Free transfer	
7 January 2022	ST	(Republic of Ireland)	Eoin Doyle	(England) Bolton Wanderers	Free transfer	
17 January 2022	RB	(Northern Ireland)	Jack Scott	(England) Wolverhampton Wanderers	Loan	
20 January 2022	CM	(Republic of Ireland)	Adam O'Reilly	(England) Preston North End	Loan	
20 January 2022	CB	(England)	Tom Grivosti	(Scotland) Ross County	Undisclosed fee	
26 January 2022	CB	(Republic of Ireland)	James Abankwah	(Italy) Udinese	Loan	
28 January 2022	GK	(Ghana)	Joseph Anang	(England) West Ham United	Loan	
18 February 2022	GK	(Republic of Ireland)	David Odumosu	(Republic of Ireland) Drogheda United	Undisclosed fee	
1 July 2022	CM	(Netherlands)	Thijs Timmermans	(Cyprus) PAEEK	Free transfer	
1 July 2022	RB	(England)	Harry Brockbank	(United States) El Paso Locomotive	Free transfer	
15 July 2022	RW	(Finland)	Serge Atakayi	(Finland) SJK	Undisclosed fee	
19 July 2022	CM	(Republic of Ireland)	Adam O'Reilly	(England) Preston North End	Loan extension	
20 July 2022	RB	(Republic of Ireland)	Barry Cotter	(Republic of Ireland) Shamrock Rovers	Loan	
14 August 2022	GK	(Republic of Ireland)	Danny Rogers	(England) Oldham Athletic	Free transfer	

==== Transfers out ====
Date	Position	Nationality	Name	To	Fee	Ref.
29 November 2021	GK	(Czech Republic)	Vítězslav Jaroš	(England) Liverpool	End of loan	
29 November 2021	ST	(England)	Nahum Melvin-Lambert	(England) Reading	End of loan	
29 November 2021	ST	(Malta)	Kyrian Nwoko	(Malta) Valletta	End of loan	
30 November 2021	GK	(Republic of Ireland)	Barry Murphy	N/A	Retired	
3 December 2021	LB	(Republic of Ireland)	Shane Griffin	(Republic of Ireland) Shelbourne	Free transfer	
10 December 2021	RB	(England)	Jak Hickman	(England) Stourbridge	Free transfer	
17 December 2021	CAM	(Republic of Ireland)	Robbie Benson	(Republic of Ireland) Dundalk	Free transfer	
23 December 2021	CB	(Republic of Ireland)	Lee Desmond	(United States) Sacramento Republic	Free transfer	
24 December 2021	RB	(Republic of Ireland)	John Mountney	(Republic of Ireland) Dundalk	Free transfer	
27 December 2021	CB	(England)	Sam Bone	(Republic of Ireland) Dundalk	Free transfer	
5 January 2022	CM	(England)	Alfie Lewis	(England) Plymouth Argyle	Free transfer	
21 January 2022	ST	(Republic of Ireland)	Tommy Lonergan	(Republic of Ireland) UCD	Free transfer	
26 January 2022	CB	(Republic of Ireland)	James Abankwah	(Italy) Udinese	Undisclosed fee	
31 January 2022	LW	(Scotland)	Matty Smith	(Republic of Ireland) Derry City	Free transfer	
23 February 2022	CB	(Republic of Ireland)	Cian Kelly	(Republic of Ireland) Athlone Town	Loan	
1 July 2022	CB	(Republic of Ireland)	James Abankwah	(Italy) Udinese	End of loan	
1 July 2022	GK	(Republic of Ireland)	Josh Keeley	(England) Tottenham Hotspur	Undisclosed fee	
4 July 2022	RW	(Republic of Ireland)	Darragh Burns	(England) Milton Keynes Dons	Undisclosed fee	
12 July 2022	RB	(Northern Ireland)	Jack Scott	(England) Wolverhampton Wanderers	Loan terminated	
14 July 2022	CM	(Republic of Ireland)	Kian Corbally	(Republic of Ireland) Longford Town	Loan	
14 August 2022	GK	(Ghana)	Joseph Anang	(England) West Ham United	Recalled from loan	

=== Squad statistics ===
==== Appearances, goals and cards ====
Number in brackets represents (appearances of which were substituted ON). Last updated – 6 November 2022

No.	Player	SSE Airtricity League		FAI Cup		UEFA Europa Conference League		President of Ireland's Cup		Total	
No.	Player	Apps	Goals	Apps	Goals	Apps	Goals	Apps	Goals	Apps	Goals
2	Barry Cotter	11(1)	2	1	0	4	0	0	0	16(1)	2
3	Ian Bermingham	12(6)	0	0	0	0	0	0	0	12(6)	0
4	Joe Redmond	36	1	1	0	4	0	1	0	42	1
5	Tom Grivosti	30(1)	1	1	1	4	0	1(1)	0	36(2)	2
6	Jamie Lennon	12(3)	0	1	0	4(1)	0	1	0	18(4)	0
7	Serge Atakayi	13(3)	4	1	0	3(3)	1	0	0	17(6)	5
8	Chris Forrester	34	5	1(1)	0	4	1	1	0	40(1)	6
9	Eoin Doyle	36(2)	14	1(1)	0	4	0	1	1	43(3)	15
10	Ronan Coughlan	10(7)	0	1	1	2(2)	0	0	0	13(9)	1
11	Jason McClelland	20(12)	1	0	0	1(1)	0	1(1)	0	22(14)	1
12	Harry Brockbank	11(2)	0	0	0	4	0	0	0	15(2)	0
14	Mark Doyle	32(14)	5	1	0	1	0	1	0	35(14)	5
15	Billy King	29(8)	4	1(1)	0	3	0	1	0	34(9)	4
16	Adam O'Reilly	34(3)	2	1(1)	0	4	0	1(1)	0	40(5)	2
18	Ben McCormack	17(10)	2	0	0	0	0	0	0	17(10)	2
19	Anthony Breslin	32(1)	2	1	0	4	0	1	0	38(1)	2
21	Danny Rogers	10	0	0	0	0	0	0	0	10	0
22	Sam Curtis	18	0	0	0	2(2)	0	0	0	20(2)	0
23	David Odumosu	2	0	0	0	0	0	0	0	2	0
24	Ben Curtis	0	0	0	0	0	0	0	0	0	0
25	Thijs Timmermans	7(1)	1	1	0	2(1)	0	0	0	10(2)	1
29	Paddy Barrett	2	0	1	0	0	0	0	0	3	0
30	Ross Fay	0	0	0	0	0	0	0	0	0	0
32	Darius Lipsiuc	1(1)	0	0	0	0	0	0	0	1(1)	0
33	Kyle Robinson	7(7)	1	0	0	0	0	0	0	7(7)	1
34	Adam Murphy	4(3)	0	0	0	0	0	0	0	4(3)	0
35	Anthony Dodd	0	0	0	0	0	0	0	0	0	0
36	Sean Molloy	0	0	0	0	0	0	0	0	0	0
45	Tunde Owolabi	28(24)	5	1(1)	0	2(2)	0	1(1)	0	32(28)	5
Players out on loan
28	Cian Kelly	0	0	0	0	0	0	0	0	0	0
31	Kian Corbally	0	0	0	0	0	0	0	0	0	0
Players that left during the season
1	Joseph Anang	24	0	1	0	4	0	1	0	30	0
2	Jack Scott	16(4)	1	0	0	0	0	1	0	17(4)	1
17	Darragh Burns	22(4)	4	0	0	0	0	1	0	23(4)	4
20	James Abankwah	11(6)	0	0	0	0	0	1	0	12(6)	0
25	Josh Keeley	0	0	0	0	0	0	0	0	0	0

==== Top scorers ====
Includes all competitive matches. Last updated 6 November 2022

Number	Name	SSE Airtricity League	FAI Cup	UEFA Europa Conference League	President of Ireland's Cup	Total
9	Eoin Doyle	14	0	0	1	15
8	Chris Forrester	5	0	1	0	6
7	Serge Atakayi	4	0	1	0	5
45	Tunde Owolabi	5	0	0	0	5
14	Mark Doyle	5	0	0	0	5
15	Billy King	4	0	0	0	4
17	Darragh Burns	4	0	0	0	4
18	Ben McCormack	2	0	0	0	2
19	Anthony Breslin	2	0	0	0	2
16	Adam O'Reilly	2	0	0	0	2
2	Barry Cotter	2	0	0	0	2
5	Tom Grivosti	1	1	0	0	2
25	Thijs Timmermans	1	0	0	0	1
10	Ronan Coughlan	0	1	0	0	1
4	Joe Redmond	1	0	0	0	1
33	Kyle Robinson	1	0	0	0	1
2	Jack Scott	1	0	0	0	1
11	Jason McClelland	1	0	0	0	1
N/A	Own goal	1	0	0	0	1

==== Top assists ====
Includes all competitive matches. Last updated 6 November 2022

Number	Name	SSE Airtricity League	FAI Cup	UEFA Europa Conference League	President of Ireland's Cup	Total
8	Chris Forrester	8	0	0	0	8
14	Mark Doyle	5	1	0	0	6
9	Eoin Doyle	4	0	1	0	5
19	Anthony Breslin	5	0	0	0	5
18	Ben McCormack	4	0	0	0	4
45	Tunde Owolabi	4	0	0	0	4
22	Sam Curtis	3	0	0	0	3
4	Joe Redmond	3	0	0	0	3
15	Billy King	3	0	0	0	3
17	Darragh Burns	3	0	0	0	3
2	Barry Cotter	1	0	0	0	1
7	Serge Atakayi	1	0	0	0	1
33	Kyle Robinson	1	0	0	0	1
3	Ian Bermingham	1	0	0	0	1
6	Jamie Lennon	0	0	0	1	1

==== Top clean sheets ====
Includes all competitive matches. Last updated 6 November 2022

Number	Name	SSE Airtricity League	FAI Cup	UEFA Europa Conference League	President of Ireland's Cup	Total
1	Joseph Anang	10/24	0/1	2/4	0/1	12/30
21	Danny Rogers	2/10	0/0	0/0	0/0	2/10
23	David Odumosu	1/2	0/0	0/0	0/0	1/2
25	Josh Keeley	0/0	0/0	0/0	0/0	0/0
36	Sean Molloy	0/0	0/0	0/0	0/0	0/0

==== Disciplinary record ====
Last updated 6 November 2022

Number	Name	SSE Airtricity League		FAI Cup		UEFA Europa Conference League		President of Ireland's Cup		Total	
Number	Name	Yellow card	Red card	Yellow card	Red card	Yellow card	Red card	Yellow card	Red card	Yellow card	Red card
16	Adam O'Reilly	12	0	0	0	1	1	0	0	13	1
8	Chris Forrester	10	1	0	0	1	0	0	0	11	1
19	Anthony Breslin	6	2	0	0	1	0	0	0	7	2
4	Joe Redmond	6	0	0	0	0	0	0	0	6	0
12	Harry Brockbank	4	0	0	0	3	0	0	0	7	0
5	Tom Grivosti	3	1	0	0	2	0	0	0	5	1
6	Jamie Lennon	3	1	1	0	1	0	0	0	5	1
22	Sam Curtis	6	0	0	0	0	0	0	0	6	0
2	Barry Cotter	3	0	1	0	1	0	0	0	5	0
14	Mark Doyle	2	1	0	0	0	1	0	0	2	2
17	Darragh Burns	4	0	0	0	0	0	0	0	4	0
45	Tunde Owolabi	2	0	0	0	1	0	0	0	3	0
18	Ben McCormack	2	0	0	0	0	0	0	0	2	0
15	Billy King	2	0	0	0	0	0	0	0	2	0
9	Eoin Doyle	2	0	0	0	0	0	0	0	2	0
21	Danny Rogers	2	0	0	0	0	0	0	0	2	0
7	Serge Atakayi	0	0	1	0	1	0	0	0	2	0
23	David Odumosu	1	0	0	0	0	0	0	0	1	0
29	Paddy Barrett	0	0	1	0	0	0	0	0	1	0
20	James Abankwah	1	0	0	0	0	0	0	0	1	0
11	Jason McClelland	1	0	0	0	0	0	0	0	1	0
3	Ian Bermingham	1	0	0	0	0	0	0	0	1	0
2	Jack Scott	1	0	0	0	0	0	0	0	1	0
Totals		74	6	4	0	12	2	0	0	90	8

==== Captains ====
No.	P	Name	Country	No. games	Notes
4	DF	Joe Redmond	(Republic of Ireland)	18	Vice-captain
8	MF	Chris Forrester	(Republic of Ireland)	17	
3	DF	Ian Bermingham	(Republic of Ireland)	6	Captain
9	DF	Eoin Doyle	(Republic of Ireland)	1	

Last updated: 6 November 2022
Source: Competitive match reports.
Competitive matches only
Matches started as captain only
Country: FIFA nationality; No.: Squad number; P: Position; Name: Player name; No. Games: Number of games started as captain.

== Club ==
=== Coaching staff ===
- First-team manager: Tim Clancy
- Assistant manager: Jon Daly
- Technical director: Alan Mathews
- Director of football: Ger O'Brien
- Coach: Seán O'Connor
- Opposition analyst: Martin Doyle
- Goalkeeping coach: Pat Jennings
- Strength and conditioning coach: Chris Coburn
- Head of medical: Sam Rice
- Club doctor: Dr Matt Corcoran
- Physiotherapist: Christy O'Neill
- Equipment manager: David McGill
- Academy director: Ger O'Brien
- Assistant academy director: Jamie Moore
- Academy lead strength and conditioning coach: Seán Fogarty
- Head of academy medical: David Mugalu
- Head of academy recruitment: Ian Cully
- Head of academy data: Phil Power
- Under 19s manager: Seán O'Connor
- Under 19s assistant manager: Niall Cully
- Under 19s coach: Paul Webb
- Under 19s goalkeeping coach: Seán Fogarty
- Under 17s manager: John Donohue
- Under 17s goalkeeping coach: Seán Fogarty
- Under 15s manager: Alan Brady
- Under 15s assistant manager: Willie Tyrell
- Under 15s coach: Ciarán Creagh
- Under 15s goalkeeping coach: Jamie Quinn
- Under 14s manager: Mark Connolly
- Under 14s assistant manager: Dan Tannim
- Under 14s goalkeeping coach: Alex Regan

=== Kit ===
Supplier: Umbro
Sponsor(s): Manguard Plus (Front of Jersey)
Clune Construction Company (Back of Jersey - Bottom)
Bill Griffin Motors (Sleeves of Jersey)

Home	Away	Pre-season

The club released new Home & Away kits for the season.

Type	Shirt	Shorts	Socks	Info
Home	Red/White Sleeves	White	Red	Worn 25 times; against Shamrock Rovers (PRC) (A), Sligo Rovers (LOI) (H), Shamrock Rovers (LOI) (H), Finn Harps (LOI) (A), UCD (LOI) (H), Drogheda United (LOI) (H), Dundalk (LOI) (H), Shamrock Rovers (LOI) (A), UCD (LOI) (A), Finn Harps (LOI) (H), Derry City (LOI) (H), Shelbourne (LOI) (H), UCD (LOI) (H), Finn Harps (LOI) (A), Shamrock Rovers (LOI) (H), NŠ Mura (UEC) (H), NŠ Mura (UEC) (A), Waterford (FAI) (H), CSKA Sofia (UEC) (H), Sligo Rovers (LOI) (H), UCD (LOI) (A), Finn Harps (LOI) (H), Derry City (LOI) (H), Dundalk (LOI) (H), Shamrock Rovers (LOI) (A)
Away	White/Navy Sleeves	Navy	Navy	Worn 16 times; against Shelbourne (LOI) (A), Bohemians (LOI) (A), Derry City (LOI) (A), Drogheda United (LOI) (A), Derry City (LOI) (A), Sligo Rovers (LOI) (A), Bohemians (LOI) (H), Drogheda United (LOI) (H), Dundalk (LOI) (H), CSKA Sofia (UEC) (A), Bohemians (LOI) (A), Drogheda United (LOI) (H), Shelbourne (LOI) (A), Bohemians (LOI) (H), Sligo Rovers (LOI) (A), Shelbourne (LOI) (H)
Preseason	Red/White Shoulders	White	Red	Worn 3 times; against Bohemians (FRN) (N), Galway United (FRN) (N), Wexford (FRN) (N)

Key:
LOI=League of Ireland Premier Division
FAI=FAI Cup
UEC=UEFA Europa Conference League
PRC=President of Ireland's Cup
FRN=Friendly

== Competitions ==
=== League of Ireland ===
==== League table ====
Pos	Team	Pld	W	D	L	GF	GA	GD	Pts	Qualification or relegation
1	Shamrock Rovers (C)	36	24	7	5	61	22	+39	79	Qualification for Champions League first qualifying round
2	Derry City	36	18	12	6	53	27	+26	66	Qualification for Europa Conference League first qualifying round
3	Dundalk	36	18	12	6	53	30	+23	66	Qualification for Europa Conference League first qualifying round
4	St Patrick's Athletic	36	18	7	11	57	37	+20	61	Qualification for Europa Conference League first qualifying round
5	Sligo Rovers	36	13	10	13	47	44	+3	49	
6	Bohemians	36	12	10	14	45	46	−1	46	
7	Shelbourne	36	10	11	15	40	49	−9	41	
8	Drogheda United	36	9	11	16	34	58	−24	38	
9	UCD (O)	36	6	8	22	28	67	−39	26	Qualification for relegation play-offs
10	Finn Harps (R)	36	4	8	24	33	71	−38	20	Relegation to 2023 League of Ireland First Division

Source: SSE Airtricity League, Soccerway
Rules for classification: 1) Points; 2) Goal difference; 3) Goals scored.
(C) Champions; (O) Play-off winners; (R) Relegated

==== Results summary ====
Overall								Home						Away					
Pld	W	D	L	GF	GA	GD	Pts	W	D	L	GF	GA	GD	W	D	L	GF	GA	GD
36	18	7	11	57	36	+21	61	10	3	5	28	15	+13	8	4	6	29	21	+8

Last updated: 6 November 2022.

==== Results by round ====
Round	1	2	3	4	5	6	7	8	9	10	11	12	13	14	15	16	17	18	19	20	21	22	23	24	25	26	27	28	29	30	31	32	33	34	35	36
Ground	A	H	A	H	A	H	A	H	H	A	A	H	H	A	A	A	H	H	A	H	A	H	H	H	H	A	A	H	A	H	A	A	H	A	A	H
Result	W	L	L	W	W	W	L	D	D	L	W	W	L	W	D	D	L	W	L	W	D	L	W	D	W	W	W	W	W	L	D	W	W	L	L	W
Position	1	2	7	4	2	1	3	3	3	4	3	3	5	3	3	4	4	4	4	4	4	4	4	4	4	4	4	4	4	4	4	4	4	4	4	4

Updated to match(es) played on 6 November 2022. Source: 2022 League of Ireland Premier Division
A = Away; H = Home; W = Win; D = Draw; L = Loss

==== Matches ====
Win Draw Loss

18 February 2022 1	Shelbourne	0–3	St Patrick's Athletic	Drumcondra, Dublin 3
19:45 GMT	Mark Coyle (yellow card) 54'; John Ross Wilson (yellow card) 70'; Aaron O'Driscoll (yellow card) 76'; Brian McManus (yellow card) 90+3'	Report	Darragh Burns 19'; Mark Doyle (yellow card) 26'; Mark Doyle 59'; Anthony Breslin (yellow card) 67'; Jason McClelland 85'	Stadium: Tolka Park; Attendance: 4,150; Referee: Rob Hennessey
Note:

25 February 2022 2	St Patrick's Athletic	1–2	Sligo Rovers	Inchicore, Dublin 8
19:45 GMT	Eoin Doyle (yellow card) 42'; Tunde Owolabi 82'	Report	Aidan Keena (yellow card) 2'; Karl O'Sullivan (yellow card) 27'; Colm Horgan 40'; Greg Bolger (yellow card) 62'; Robbie McCourt (yellow card) 70'; Aidan Keena 77'	Stadium: Richmond Park; Attendance: 3,930; Referee: Ben Connolly

28 February 2022 3	Bohemians	1–0	St Patrick's Athletic	Phibsborough, Dublin 7
19:45 GMT	Stephen Mallon 49'; Jordan Flores (yellow card) 90+1'	Report		Stadium: Dalymount Park; Attendance: 3,516; Referee: Neil Doyle
Note:

4 March 2022 4	St Patrick's Athletic	1–0	Shamrock Rovers	Inchicore, Dublin 8
19:45 GMT	Chris Forrester 55'; Darragh Burns (yellow card) 70'; Mark Doyle (yellow card) 89'; Jack Scott	Report	Lee Grace (yellow card) 57'	Stadium: Richmond Park; Attendance: 4,871; Referee: Rob Harvey
Note:

11 March 2022 5	Finn Harps	0–2	St Patrick's Athletic	Ballybofey, County Donegal
20:00 GMT	Élie N'Zeyi (yellow card) 33'; Ryan Connolly (yellow card) 80'	Report	Jack Scott 65'; Eoin Doyle 78'; Ian Bermingham (yellow card) 90+1'	Stadium: Finn Park; Attendance: 1,515; Referee: Adriano Reale
Note:

14 March 2022 6	St Patrick's Athletic	2–0	UCD	Inchicore, Dublin 8
19:45 GMT	Eoin Doyle 34'; Mark Doyle 58'; Anthony Breslin (yellow card) 63'	Report	Jack Keaney (yellow card) 59'; Sam Todd (yellow card) 87'	Stadium: Richmond Park; Attendance: 2,627; Referee: Ray Matthews

18 March 2022 7	Derry City	2–1	St Patrick's Athletic	Derry, Northern Ireland
19:45 GMT	Will Patching 4'; Shane McEleney (yellow card) 20'; Joe Thomson (yellow card) 46'; Will Patching 90+3'	Report	Tom Grivosti 47'	Stadium: Ryan McBride Brandywell Stadium; Attendance: 3,125; Referee: Damien McGrath
Note:

1 April 2022 8	St Patrick's Athletic	1–1	Drogheda United	Inchicore, Dublin 8
19:45 GMT	Darragh Burns (yellow card) 20'; Darragh Burns 78'	Report	Dayle Rooney 18'; James Clarke (yellow card) 61'; Georgie Poynton (yellow card) 78'	Stadium: Richmond Park; Attendance: 3,325; Referee: Ben Connolly
Note:

8 April 2022 9	St Patrick's Athletic	0–0	Dundalk	Inchicore, Dublin 8
19:45 GMT	Tom Grivosti (yellow card) 75'; Joe Redmond (yellow card) 82'; Jason McClelland (yellow card) 90+4'	Report	Greg Sloggett (yellow card) 28'; Daniel Kelly (yellow card) 60'; Robbie Benson (yellow card) 82'; David McMillan (yellow card) 90+3'; Joe Adams (yellow card) 90+4'	Stadium: Richmond Park; Attendance: 4,322; Referee: Rob Harvey
Note:

15 April 2022 10	Shamrock Rovers	1–0	St Patrick's Athletic	Tallaght, Dublin 24
20:00 GMT	Rory Gaffney 51'	Report	James Abankwah (yellow card) 43'; Joe Redmond (yellow card) 44'; Tunde Owolabi (yellow card) 90+1'; Chris Forrester (yellow card) 90+4'	Stadium: Tallaght Stadium; Attendance: 7,427; Referee: Paul McLoughlin
Note:

18 April 2022 11	UCD	1–2	St Patrick's Athletic	Belfield, Dublin 4
17:00 GMT	Adam Verdon (yellow card) 42'; Sean Brennan (yellow card) 45'	Report	Eoin Doyle (penalty missed) 75'; Ben McCormack 75'; Chris Forrester (yellow card) 77'; Mark Dignam 89' (o.g.)	Stadium: UCD Bowl; Attendance: 1,200 (Est.); Referee: Damien McGrath
Note:

22 April 2022 12	St Patrick's Athletic	2–0	Finn Harps	Inchicore, Dublin 8
19:45 GMT	Eoin Doyle 38'; Eoin Doyle 58' (pen.); Chris Forrester (yellow card) 84'	Report	Élie N'Zeyi (yellow card) 43'; Rob Slevin (yellow card) 59'	Stadium: Richmond Park; Attendance: 2,800 (Est.); Referee: Adriano Reale
Note:

29 April 2022 13	St Patrick's Athletic	0–4	Derry City	Inchicore, Dublin 8
19:45 GMT	Ronan Coughlan (yellow card) 68'	Report	Matty Smith 4'; Jamie McGonigle 30'; Jamie McGonigle 41'; Cameron Dummigan 60'	Stadium: Richmond Park; Attendance: 3,500 (Est.); Referee: Rob Hennessey
Note:

6 May 2022 14	Drogheda United	0–4	St Patrick's Athletic	Drogheda, County Louth
19:45 GMT	Luke Heeney (yellow card) 45+3'; James Clarke (yellow card) 78'	Report	Darragh Burns 4'; Eoin Doyle 35'; Anthony Breslin (yellow card) 48'; Billy King 67'; Kyle Robinson 86'	Stadium: Head In The Game Park; Attendance: 2,500 (Est.); Referee: John McLoughlin
Note:

9 May 2022 15	Derry City	0–0	St Patrick's Athletic	Derry, Northern Ireland
19:45 GMT			Sam Curtis (yellow card) 66'	Stadium: Ryan McBride Brandywell Stadium; Attendance: 3,300 (Est.); Referee: Rob Hennessey
Note: Originally scheduled for 8 July but was rescheduled due to both clubs involvement in the UEFA Europa Conference League.

14 May 2022 16	Sligo Rovers	1–1	St Patrick's Athletic	Sligo, County Sligo
19:45 GMT	Aidan Keena 36'; Garry Buckley (yellow card) 44'; Shane Blaney (yellow card) 52'; Ed McGinty (yellow card) 55'; Lewis Banks (yellow card) 69'	Report	Darragh Burns 51'; Darragh Burns (yellow card) 86'; Adam O'Reilly (yellow card) 90+1'	Stadium: The Showgrounds; Attendance: 2,123; Referee: Rob Harvey
Note:

20 May 2022 17	St Patrick's Athletic	1–2	Shelbourne	Inchicore, Dublin 8
19:45 GMT	Ben McCormack (yellow card) 26'; Billy King (yellow card) 28'; Sam Curtis (yellow card) 35'; Joe Redmond 45+3'; Adam O'Reilly (yellow card) 79'; Darragh Burns (yellow card) 80'	Report	Seán Boyd (yellow card) 18'; Jack Moylan 23'; Jonathan Lunney 53'	Stadium: Richmond Park; Attendance: 3,800 (Est.); Referee: Damien McGrath
Note:

23 May 2022 18	St Patrick's Athletic	3–0	Bohemians	Inchicore, Dublin 8
19:45 GMT	Tunde Owolabi 5'; Tunde Owolabi 45+2'; Tunde Owolabi 68' (pen.); Adam O'Reilly (yellow card) 80'	Report	Ali Coote (yellow card) 35'; Max Murphy (yellow card) 62'	Stadium: Richmond Park; Attendance: 3,473; Referee: Neil Doyle
Note:

27 May 2022 19	Dundalk	1–0	St Patrick's Athletic	Dundalk, County Louth
19:45 GMT	Daniel Kelly 24'	Report	Anthony Breslin (yellow card) 87'	Stadium: Oriel Park; Attendance: 2,889; Referee: Ray Matthews
Note:

17 June 2022 20	St Patrick's Athletic	2–1	UCD	Inchicore, Dublin 8
19:45 GMT	Eoin Doyle 49'; Sam Curtis (yellow card) 53'; Anthony Breslin (yellow card) 68'; Eoin Doyle 72' (pen.)	Report	Kian Moore (yellow card) 72'; Evan Caffrey (yellow card) 74'; Alex Nolan 87'	Stadium: Richmond Park; Attendance: 2,700 (Est.); Referee: Ben Connolly

24 June 2022 21	Finn Harps	2–2	St Patrick's Athletic	Ballybofey, County Donegal
20:00 GMT	Élie N'Zeyi (yellow card) 16'; Ryan Rainey (yellow card) 27'; Eric McWoods (yellow card) 46'; Ethan Boyle (yellow card) 66'; Regan Donelon (yellow card) 85'; José Carrillo 88'; Ethan Boyle 90+6'	Report	Billy King 6'; Chris Forrester (yellow card) 37'; Billy King 64'	Stadium: Finn Park; Attendance: 821; Referee: John McLoughlin
Note:

27 June 2022 22	St Patrick's Athletic	1–2	Shamrock Rovers	Inchicore, Dublin 8
19:45 GMT	Joe Redmond (yellow card) 45'; Adam O'Reilly (yellow card) 88'; Eoin Doyle 90+3' (pen.)	Report	Sean Gannon (yellow card) 38'; Andy Lyons 61'; Aaron Greene 71'; Gary O'Neill (yellow card) 81'; Barry Cotter (yellow card) 88'	Stadium: Richmond Park; Attendance: 4,365; Referee: Rob Hennessey
Note: Fixture was originally due to be played on 10 June 2022 but was postponed due to international call-ups.

1 July 2022 23	St Patrick's Athletic	3–0	Drogheda United	Inchicore, Dublin 8
19:45 GMT	Joe Redmond (yellow card) 23'; Adam O'Reilly (yellow card) 35'; Billy King 41'; Eoin Doyle 86'; Mark Doyle 90+1'	Report	Ryan Brennan (yellow card) 73'; Dayle Rooney (yellow card) 83'; Colin McCabe (yellow card) 90+5'	Stadium: Richmond Park; Attendance: 2,115; Referee: Ray Matthews
Note:

15 July 2022 24	St Patrick's Athletic	1–1	Dundalk	Inchicore, Dublin 8
19:45 GMT	Eoin Doyle 15'; Adam O'Reilly (yellow card) 51'; Serge Atakayi (yellow card) 66'; Chris Forrester (yellow card) 66'	Report	Patrick Hoban (yellow card) 57'; Daniel Kelly 77'; Greg Sloggett (yellow card) 77'; Paul Doyle (yellow card) 86'	Stadium: Richmond Park; Attendance: 4,000 (Est.); Referee: Rob Hennessey
Note:

14 August 2022 25	St Patrick's Athletic	1–0	Sligo Rovers	Inchicore, Dublin 8
17:00 GMT	Serge Atakayi 31'; Harry Brockbank (yellow card) 58'; Mark Doyle (red card) 64'	Report	Paddy Kirk (yellow card) 29'; Adam McDonnell (yellow card) 82'	Stadium: Richmond Park; Attendance: 1,900 (Est.); Referee: Ben Connolly
Note: Originally scheduled for 12 August but was rescheduled due to both clubs involvement in the UEFA Europa Conference League on 11 August.

19 August 2022 26	UCD	1–2	St Patrick's Athletic	Belfield, Dublin 4
19:45 GMT	Dylan Duffy 61'	Report	Thijs Timmermans 8'; Serge Atakayi 51'	Stadium: UCD Bowl; Attendance: 1,200 (Est.); Referee: Oliver Moran

29 August 2022 27	Bohemians	1–3	St Patrick's Athletic	Phibsborough, Dublin 7
19:45 GMT	Rory Feely 62'; Rory Feely (yellow card) 90'	Report	Barry Cotter 8'; Jamie Lennon (yellow card) 34'; Chris Forrester 45+1'; Harry Brockbank (yellow card) 63'; Anthony Breslin (yellow card) 78'; Adam O'Reilly 89'	Stadium: Dalymount Park; Attendance: 3,400 (Est.); Referee: Paul McLaughlin
Note: Fixture was originally due to be played on 22 July 2022 but was postponed due to St Patrick's Athletic's involvement in the UEFA Europa Conference League on 21 July.

2 September 2022 28	St Patrick's Athletic	2–1	Finn Harps	Inchicore, Dublin 8
19:45 GMT	Chris Forrester 15'; Anthony Breslin 18'; Barry Cotter (yellow card) 85'	Report	Barry McNamee 24'; Gary Boylan (yellow card) 60'; Eric McWoods (yellow card) 73'; Élie N'Zeyi (yellow card) 75'; Liam McGing (red card) 86'	Stadium: Richmond Park; Attendance: 2,700 (Est.); Referee: Ray Matthews
Note:

9 September 2022 29	Drogheda United	0–2	St Patrick's Athletic	Drogheda, County Louth
19:45 GMT	Colin McCabe (yellow card) 5'; Darragh Markey (yellow card) 16'; Luke Heeney (yellow card) 89'	Report	Eoin Doyle (penalty missed) 6'; Anthony Breslin (red card) 23'; Joe Redmond (yellow card) 35'; Adam O'Reilly (yellow card) 55'; Mark Doyle 70'; Harry Brockbank (yellow card) 89'; Barry Cotter (yellow card) 90+2'; Chris Forrester 90+5' (pen.)	Stadium: Head In The Game Park; Attendance: 2,300 (Est.); Referee: Sean Grant
Note:

30 September 2022 30	St Patrick's Athletic	0–1	Derry City	Inchicore, Dublin 8
19:45 GMT	Danny Rogers (yellow card) 19'; Barry Cotter (yellow card) 55'; Adam O'Reilly (yellow card) 64'; Joe Redmond (yellow card) 88'; Chris Forrester (yellow card) 90'; Chris Forrester (yellow card) 90+6' (yellow-red card); Tom Grivosti (red card) FT	Report	Cameron Dummigan (yellow card) 26'; Cian Kavanagh 70'; Brian Maher (yellow card) 90+1'; Daniel Lafferty (yellow card) 90+5'; Ryan Graydon (yellow card) 90+5'; James Akintunde (yellow card) 90+6'; Ryan Graydon (yellow card) 90+6' (yellow-red card)	Stadium: Richmond Park; Attendance: 4,000 (Est.); Referee: Derek Tomney
Note:

3 October 2022 31	Shelbourne	4–4	St Patrick's Athletic	Drumcondra, Dublin 3
19:45 GMT	Seán Boyd 13'; Matty Smith 27'; Matty Smith (yellow card) 32'; Jonathan Lunney (yellow card) 45'; Seán Boyd (yellow card) 45+3'; Seán Boyd 52' (pen.); Jonathan Lunney 65'; Gavin Molloy (yellow card) 83'	Report	Barry Cotter 20'; Adam O'Reilly (yellow card) 40'; Seán Boyd 45+2' (o.g.); Jamie Lennon (yellow card) 49'; Eoin Doyle 68' (pen.); Sam Curtis (yellow card) 71'; Harry Brockbank (yellow card) 74'; Eoin Doyle 78' (pen.); Jamie Lennon (yellow card) 90+5' (yellow-red card)	Stadium: Tolka Park; Attendance: 2,500 (Est.); Referee: Neil Doyle
Note: Originally scheduled for 5 August but was rescheduled due to St Patrick's Athletic's involvement in the UEFA Europa Conference League on 4 August. Fixture was further postponed due to travel arrangements resulting in St Patrick's Athletic only arriving back to Dublin on 7 August.

7 October 2022 32	Dundalk	1–2	St Patrick's Athletic	Dundalk, County Louth
19:45 GMT	Ryan O'Kane 45+1'; Darragh Leahy (yellow card) 80'; Sam Bone (yellow card) 90+1'; Andy Boyle (yellow card) 90+1'	Report	Tom Grivosti (yellow card) 7'; Chris Forrester 20'; Chris Forrester (yellow card) 40'; Adam O'Reilly (yellow card) 88'; Adam O'Reilly 90+3'	Stadium: Oriel Park; Attendance: 2,734; Referee: Damien McGrath
Note:

14 October 2022 33	St Patrick's Athletic	3–1	Bohemians	Inchicore, Dublin 8
19:45 GMT	Serge Atakayi 7'; Sam Curtis (yellow card) 26'; Mark Doyle 48'; Tunde Owolabi 87'	Report	Conor Levingston (yellow card) 17'; James Clarke (yellow card) 69'; James McManus (yellow card) 81'; James Clarke 83'; Kris Twardek (yellow card) 84'; Chris Lotefa (yellow card) 90+3'	Stadium: Richmond Park; Attendance: 5,106; Referee: Adriano Reale
Note:

21 October 2022 34	Shamrock Rovers	4–1	St Patrick's Athletic	Tallaght, Dublin 24
19:45 GMT	Graham Burke 36' (pen.); Daniel Cleary 45'; Seán Hoare 54'; Seán Hoare (yellow card) 68'; Chris McCann (yellow card) 68'; Richie Towell (yellow card) 71'; Graham Burke 76' (pen.)	Report	Serge Atakayi 4'; Danny Rogers (yellow card) 45+1'; Adam O'Reilly (yellow card) 45+1'; Eoin Doyle (yellow card) 45+1'; Tunde Owolabi (yellow card) 63'; Tunde Owolabi (penalty missed) 69'; Anthony Breslin (red card) 74'	Stadium: Tallaght Stadium; Attendance: 7,469; Referee: Rob Hennessey
Note: Live on RTÉ Two

29 October 2022 35	Sligo Rovers	1–0	St Patrick's Athletic	Sligo, County Sligo
19:45 GMT	Adam McDonnell (yellow card) 6'; Frank Liivak (yellow card) 35'; Aidan Keena 54' (pen.)	Report	Adam O'Reilly (yellow card) 27'; Billy King (yellow card) 79'; Chris Forrester (yellow card) 82'	Stadium: The Showgrounds; Attendance: 2,000 (Est.); Referee: John McLoughlin
Note:

6 November 2022 36	St Patrick's Athletic	4–0	Shelbourne	Inchicore, Dublin 8
19:00 GMT	Eoin Doyle 14'; Eoin Doyle 20'; Chris Forrester (yellow card) 30'; Tom Grivosti (yellow card) 31'; Sam Curtis (yellow card) 33'; Anthony Breslin 38'; Ben McCormack (yellow card) 39'; David Odumosu (yellow card) 83'; Ben McCormack 89'	Report	Mark Coyle (yellow card) 29'; Jack Moylan (yellow card) 33'; Matty Smith (yellow card) 57'; Shane Griffin (yellow card) 62'	Stadium: Richmond Park; Attendance: 4,644; Referee: Paul McLaughlin

=== FAI Cup ===
Win Draw Loss

==== First round ====
31 July 2022 First Round	St Patrick's Athletic	2–3	Waterford	Inchicore, Dublin 8
15:00	Serge Atakayi (yellow card) 18'; Ronan Coughlan 18' (pen.); Tom Grivosti 28'; Paddy Barrett (yellow card) 36'; Jamie Lennon (yellow card) 60'; Barry Cotter (yellow card)	Report	Wassim Aouachria 13'; Wassim Aouachria 33'; Junior Quitirna 42'; Darragh Power (yellow card); Niall O'Keeffe (yellow card); Tunmise Sobowale (yellow card); Wassim Aouachria (yellow card)	Stadium: Richmond Park; Attendance: 2,200 (Est.); Referee: Rob Hennessey

=== UEFA Europa Conference League ===
Win Draw Loss

==== Second qualifying round ====
21 July 2022 1st leg	St Patrick's Athletic (Republic of Ireland)	1–1	(Slovenia) NŠ Mura	Dublin, Republic of Ireland
19:45	Chris Forrester 59'; Mark Doyle (red card) 90+1'	Report	Klemen Pucko (yellow card) 3'; Mirlind Daku 28'; Luka Bobičanec (yellow card) 56'; Kai Cipot (yellow card) 68'; Nik Lorbek (yellow card) 72'	Stadium: Richmond Park; Attendance: 2,700; Referee: Ishmael Barbara (Malta)
Note: Capacity of Richmond Park reduced to 2,700 due to UEFA regulations on standing areas not being used during UEFA Europa League matches.

28 July 2022 2nd leg	NŠ Mura (Slovenia)	0–0 (5–6 p)	(Republic of Ireland) St Patrick's Athletic	Murska Sobota, Slovenia
20:00 (Local time)	Nik Lorbek (yellow card) 41'; Mirlind Daku (yellow card) 48'; Matic Maruško (red card) 71'; Mihael Klepač (yellow card) 90+4'; Luka Bobičanec (yellow card) 90+4'	Report	Harry Brockbank (yellow card) 42'; Chris Forrester (yellow card) 71'; Adam O'Reilly (yellow card) 93'	Stadium: Fazanerija City Stadium; Attendance: 3,800; Referee: Ura Shnyder (Switzerland)
	Penalties
	Luka Bobičanec (penalty scored); Josip Majić (penalty missed); Mirlind Daku (penalty scored); Mihael Klepač (penalty missed); Martin Šroler (penalty scored); Amar Beganović (penalty scored); Matko Obradovic (penalty scored); Kai Cipot (penalty missed)		Eoin Doyle (penalty scored); Ronan Coughlan (penalty scored); Barry Cotter (penalty missed); Jason McClelland (penalty scored); Tom Grivosti (penalty missed); Thijs Timmermans (penalty scored); Serge Atakayi (penalty scored); Joe Redmond (penalty scored)

==== Third qualifying round ====
4 August 2022 1st leg	CSKA Sofia (Bulgaria)	0–1	(Republic of Ireland) St Patrick's Athletic	Sofia, Bulgaria
20:00 (Local time)	Georgi Yomov (yellow card) 86'	Report	Tom Grivosti (yellow card) 35'; Barry Cotter (yellow card) 49'; Anthony Breslin (yellow card) 59'; Harry Brockbank (yellow card) 61'; Jamie Lennon (yellow card) 76'; Serge Atakayi 87'	Stadium: Vasil Levski National Stadium; Attendance: 7,048; Referee: Manuel Schüttengruber (Austria)
Note: Fixture moved to Vasil Levski National Stadium as Stadion Balgarska Armia does not meet the UEFA stadium category 3 status for this round of the competition.

11 August 2022 2nd leg	St Patrick's Athletic (Republic of Ireland)	0–2	(Bulgaria) CSKA Sofia	Dublin, Republic of Ireland
19:45	Tom Grivosti (yellow card) 56'; Serge Atakayi (yellow card) 75'; Harry Brockbank (yellow card) 80'; Tunde Owolabi (yellow card) 89'; Adam O'Reilly (red card) FT	Report	Mauricio Garcez 12'; Georgi Yomov (yellow card) 15'; Jurgen Mattheij (yellow card) 27'; Amos Youga (yellow card) 59'; Stanislav Shopov (yellow card) 74'; Ivan Turitsov 82' (pen.); Ivan Turitsov (yellow card) 88'; Menno Koch (yellow card) 90+5'; Bradley de Nooijer (red card) FT	Stadium: Tallaght Stadium; Attendance: 6,760; Referee: Horațiu Feșnic (Romania)
Note: Fixture moved to Tallaght Stadium as Richmond Park does not meet the UEFA stadium category 3 status for this round of the competition.

=== President of Ireland's Cup ===
Win Draw Loss

11 February 2022 Final	Shamrock Rovers	1–1 (5–4 p)	St Patrick's Athletic	Tallaght, Dublin 24
20:00	Ronan Finn 67'	Report	Eoin Doyle 50'	Stadium: Tallaght Stadium; Attendance: 5,426; Referee: Rob Harvey
	Penalties
	Richie Towell (penalty scored); Graham Burke (penalty scored); Seán Hoare (penalty scored); Gary O'Neil (penalty scored); Jack Byrne (penalty scored)		Eoin Doyle (penalty scored); Mark Doyle (penalty scored); Chris Forrester (penalty missed); Tunde Owolabi (penalty scored); Adam O'Reilly (penalty scored)

=== Friendlies ===
Win Draw Loss

==== Pre-season ====
21 January 2022	Bohemians	2–3	St Patrick's Athletic	Blanchardstown, Dublin 15
19:00	Jamie Mullins 20'; Promise Omochere 70'	Report	Eoin Doyle 22'; Kyle Robinson 64'; Mark Doyle 88'	Stadium: FAI National Training Centre; Attendance: 50 (Est.); Referee: Neil Doyle
Note: Behind Closed Doors

28 January 2022	Galway United	2–0	St Patrick's Athletic	Lecarrow, County Roscommon
15:00	Mikey Rowe 52'; Jordan Adeyemo 75'	Report		Stadium: Roscommon & District Soccer League Grounds; Attendance: 0
Note: Behind Closed Doors

2 February 2022	St Patrick's Athletic	1–1	Wexford	Blanchardstown, Dublin 15
19:30	Adam O'Reilly 50'		Aaron Dobbs 51'	Stadium: FAI National Training Centre; Attendance: 0
Note: Behind Closed Doors

5 February 2022	St Patrick's Athletic	1–0	Cork City	Inchicore, Dublin 8
15:00	Mark Doyle 24'			Stadium: Richmond Park; Attendance: 900 (Est.); Referee: Neil Doyle

==== Mid-season ====
11 June 2022	St Patrick's Athletic	3–0	Drogheda United	Inchicore, Dublin 8
11:00	TBC; TBC; TBC			Stadium: Richmond Park; Attendance: 0
Note: Behind closed doors friendly.

9 July 2022	St Patrick's Athletic	1–0	Glenavon	Dublin, Republic of Ireland
14:00	Jason McClelland			Stadium: Richmond Park; Attendance: 0
Note: Behind closed doors friendly.
