= Mark Doyle (footballer) =

Irish footballer (born 1998)

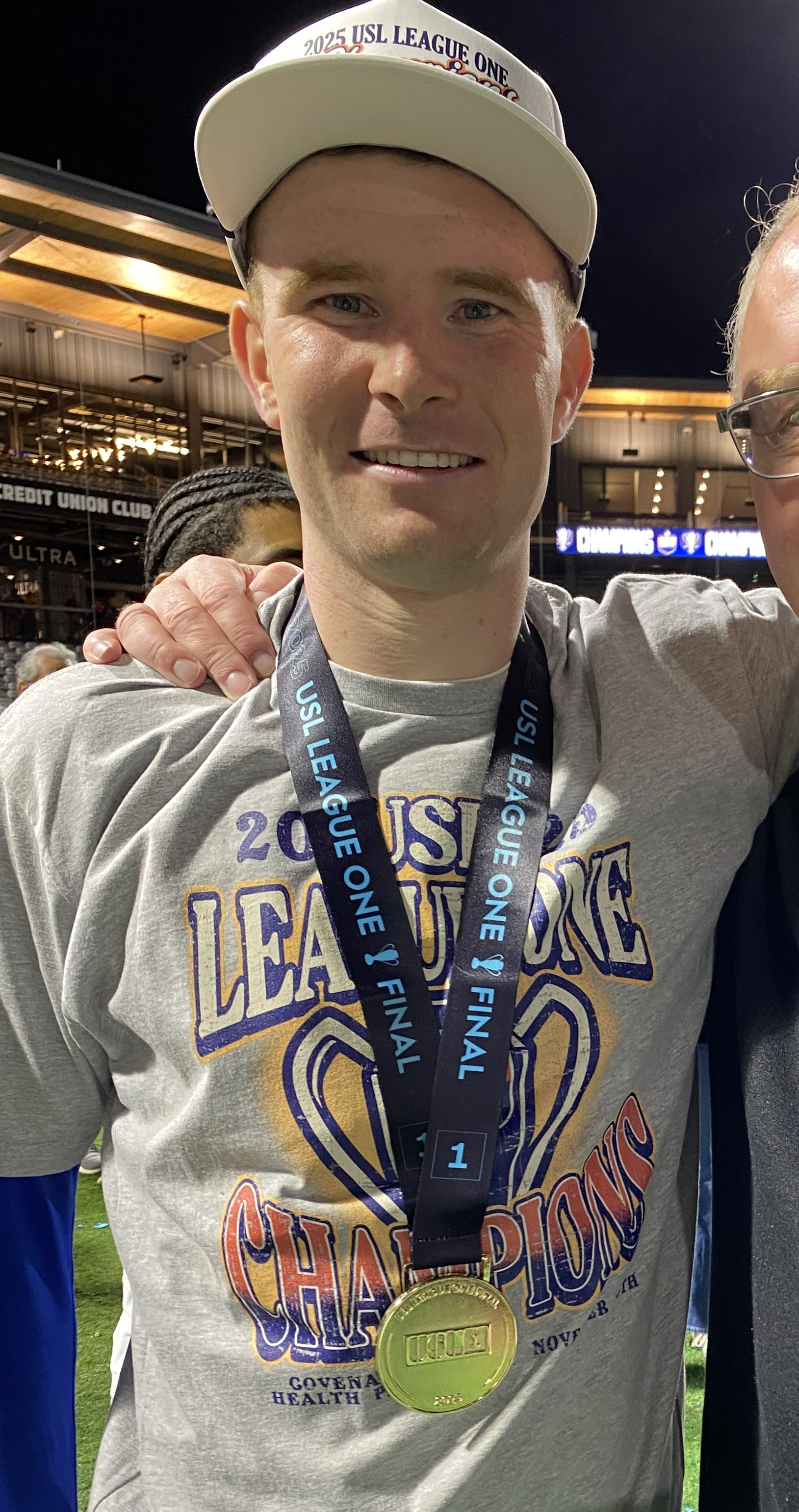
- Doyle with One Knoxville in 2025

Personal information
- Date of birth: 19 November 1998 (age 27)
- Place of birth: Skerries, County Dublin, Ireland
- Positions: Winger; striker

Team information
- Current team: Drogheda United
- Number: 14

Youth career
- Skerries Town
- –2015: Glebe North
- 2015–2017: Drogheda United

Senior career*
Years	Team	Apps	(Gls)
2016–2021	Drogheda United	126	(47)
2022–2023	St Patrick's Athletic	63	(12)
2024	Rhode Island	28	(2)
2025	One Knoxville	15	(4)
2025–	Drogheda United	34	(11)
- * Club domestic league appearances and goals as of 00:17, 8 November 2026 (UTC)

Mark Doyle (born 19 November 1998) is an Irish professional footballer who plays as a winger or striker for League of Ireland First Division club Drogheda United. His previous clubs are St Patrick's Athletic, Rhode Island and One Knoxille.

== Club career ==
=== Youth career ===
A native of Skerries, County Dublin, Doyle began playing underage football with Skerries Town. He later joined Glebe North in nearby Balbriggan before moving to League of Ireland club Drogheda United. At Drogheda, he progressed through their under-17 and under-19 sides to the first team in their 2015, 2016 & 2017 seasons.

=== Drogheda United ===
==== 2016 season ====
Doyle made his debut in senior football on 22 February 2016 in a Leinster Senior Cup match against Bohemians at United Park. His League of Ireland First Division debut came on 4 March 2016 when he came on as a late substitute in a 2–1 win over Waterford. He made 8 first team appearances in all competitions over the season as his side won promotion to the League of Ireland Premier Division.

==== 2017 season ====
On 1 February 2017, he scored his first goals at senior level when he scored a brace in a 5–1 win over Cabinteely in a pre-season friendly. Doyle's first league start and first League of Ireland Premier Division appearance came on 7 April 2017 in a 2–1 win against Shamrock Rovers in which Doyle was named Man of the Match. His first competitive goal at senior level came on 13 August 2017 in a 4–0 win away to Evergreen in the FAI Cup First Round. Doyle's first League of Ireland goal came on 29 September 2017, scoring a late consolation goal away to Derry City after coming on as an 80th-minute substitute. He ended the season with 2 goals in 16 appearances in all competitions as his side were relegated.

==== 2018 season ====
During pre-season, Doyle discharged himself from hospital to attend a training session with the team due to his determination to earn his place in the starting 11, training with the tube from an IV drip still in his hand following treatment for a serious chest infection. He started the 2018 season off in fine form, scoring a brace in a 6–0 win in the opening game of the season against Athlone Town, as well as goals in an 8–1 win away to Wexford and a 2–2 draw with Galway United to take his tally to 4 goals in the first 3 games of the season. The season ended in disappointment for Drogheda as they missed out on promotion after being knocked out of the Play-Offs by Finn Harps at the semi-final stage. Doyle scored 8 goals in 34 appearances in all competitions over the season.

==== 2019 season ====
Doyle scored as many as 4 braces over the course of the 2019 season to help his side to a second-placed finish. Unfortunately for Doyle and Drogheda, they again tasted heartbreak as they were beaten in the 2019 League of Ireland Promotion and Relegation Play-Off Final by Finn Harps. He made a total of 29 appearances in all competitions over the season, scoring 13 goals.

==== 2020 season ====
Doyle won the first medal of his senior career on 27 October 2020 when his side won the 2020 League of Ireland First Division title after a 2–0 win away to Cabinteely in the final game of the season. Doyle scored an impressive 13 goals in 18 league games to help his side to the title. On 1 November 2020, Doyle was named as Drogheda United Supporters' Player of the Year. In December 2020, he was named PFAI First Division Player of the Year for the 2020 season as well as being named in the 2020 PFAI First Division Team of the Year by his fellow players.

==== 2021 season ====
On 20 August 2021, Doyle scored a brace in a 2–1 win in the Louth derby against Dundalk, a first win at Oriel Park in 9 years for Drogheda. On 19 November 2021, he scored against Shamrock Rovers in the final game of the season, his 50th goal for the club in what turned out to be his final appearance for them. Doyle featured in all 37 of Drogheda's games over the 2021 season, scoring 13 league goals to make him third top goalscorer in the division, behind Georgie Kelly and Danny Mandroiu. Following his form in his first season back in the top flight, Doyle was reportedly attracting interest from Scottish Premiership side Motherwell, as well as League of Ireland Premier Division rivals St Patrick's Athletic and Shelbourne.

=== St Patrick's Athletic ===
==== 2022 season ====
On 18 December 2021, it was announced that Doyle had signed for St Patrick's Athletic, following Drogheda United manager Tim Clancy to Inchicore for the 2022 season, becoming one of his first signings at the club. On 11 February 2022, he made his debut for the club in the 2022 President of Ireland's Cup against Shamrock Rovers at Tallaght Stadium, scoring in the penalty shootout as his side lost 5–4 on penalties after a 1–1 draw. On 18 February 2022, he scored his first goal for the club in a 3–0 win over Shelbourne at Tolka Park in the opening game of the season. On 14 March 2022, he scored a 25-yard half volley in a 2–0 win over UCD at Richmond Park. On 1 July 2022, he scored the final goal in a 3–0 win over his former club Drogheda United at Richmond Park. Doyle made his first appearance in European football on 21 July 2022 in a 1–1 draw with Slovenian side NŠ Mura in the UEFA Europa Conference League and was shown a straight red card in injury time for an off the ball incident. On 9 September 2022 he opened the scoring in a 2–0 win away to his old club Drogheda United to help his team to their fifth consecutive win. On 14 October 2022, he scored in a 3–1 win at home to Bohemians. Doyle scored 5 goals in 35 appearances in all competitions during his first season with the club.

==== 2023 season ====
Doyle's first goal of the 2023 season on 7 April 2023, scoring the final goal in a 4–0 win over Cork City at Richmond Park. A week later on 14 April 2023, he scored what turned out to be the winning goal in a 3–2 win away to league leaders Bohemians at Dalymount Park. Doyle opened the scoring away to Shamrock Rovers on 15 May 2023, in an eventual 3–2 defeat at Tallaght Stadium. On 26 May 2023, he opened the scoring in a 2–1 win over Dundalk at Richmond Park. On 5 June 2023, Doyle came off the bench in the 64th minute of a 4–1 win at home to Derry City and scored the final goal of the game in the 80th minute. On 12 July 2023, his first European goal came when he scored in the 94th minute of a 2–1 loss against F91 Dudelange in the first qualifying round of the UEFA Europa Conference League at the Stade Jos Nosbaum. On 29 September he secured all 3 points for his side in a 1–0 win away to Cork City, heading home a Jamie Lennon cross in the 77th minute at Turners Cross. 9 days later he opened the scoring in a 2–0 win in the FAI Cup Semi-Final, again away to Cork City. He scored in a third consecutive game on 20 October 2023, opening the scoring in a 2–0 win away to Bohemians. On 12 November 2023, Doyle scored the equalising goal in an eventual 3–1 win for his side over Bohemians in the 2023 FAI Cup Final, at the Aviva Stadium.

=== Rhode Island ===
Doyle signed for USL Championship club Rhode Island on November 21, 2023, as part of the expansion club's inaugural squad. He was released by Rhode Island following the 2024 season, after scoring 2 goals in 32 appearances for the club.

=== One Knoxville ===
In February 2025, Doyle signed for USL League One club One Knoxville for the 2025 season. He scored his first goal for the club on 23 March 2025, in a 2–0 win away to Texoma. In October 2025, Doyle was part of the One Knoxville squad that became USL League One regular season champions (the USL1 Players' Shield). In November 2025, Doyle won his second trophy at One Knoxville when he was part of the team that won the USL League One playoffs, with a 2–0 win over Spokane Velocity, at Covenant Health Park. The final broke the USL League One attendance record, with 7,500 fans on site.

=== Return to Drogheda United ===
On 28 November 2025, it was announced that Doyle had returned to his first senior club, League of Ireland Premier Division side Drogheda United on a two-year-contract. He scored his first goal since returning to the club on 13 February 2026, in a 2–0 win at home to Waterford. He scored 15 goals in 39 appearances in all competitions, including the opening goal in the final of the 2026 League of Ireland play-offs but it wasn't enough for his side as they were defeated 2–1 on 7 November 2026 by UCD, resulting in relegation for Drogheda.

== Personal life ==
His grandfather Mick Doyle was a former Kildare GAA senior footballer, featuring in the side that won the 1956 Leinster Senior Football Championship after beating Wexford GAA at Croke Park.

== Career statistics ==
As of match played 8 November 2026

Appearances and goals by club, season and competition
Club	Season	League			National Cup (Note: Includes FAI Cup & U.S. Open Cup)		League Cup (Note: Includes League of Ireland Cup & USL Cup)		Continental		Other		Total	
Club	Season	Division	Apps	Goals	Apps	Goals	Apps	Goals	Apps	Goals	Apps	Goals	Apps	Goals
Drogheda United	2016	LOI First Division	6	0	0	0	1	0	—		1 (Note: Appearances in the Leinster Senior Cup)	0	8	0
Drogheda United	2017	LOI Premier Division	15	1	1	1	0	0	—		0	0	16	2
Drogheda United	2018	LOI First Division	27	8	2	0	1	1	—		4 (Note: Appearances in the 2018 League of Ireland First Division Play-Offs)	0	34	8
Drogheda United	2019	LOI First Division	24	12	2	1	1	0	—		2 (Note: Appearances in the 2019 League of Ireland First Division Play-Offs)	0	29	13
Drogheda United	2020	LOI First Division	18	13	1	0	—		—		—		19	13
Drogheda United	2021	LOI Premier Division	36	13	1	0	—		—		—		37	13
Drogheda United	Total		126	47	7	2	3	1	—		7	0	143	50
St Patrick's Athletic	2022	LOI Premier Division	32	5	1	0	—		1 (Note: Appearances in the UEFA Europa Conference League)	0	1 (Note: Appearance in the President of Ireland's Cup)	0	35	5
St Patrick's Athletic	2023	LOI Premier Division	31	7	5	2	—		2	1	0	0	38	10
St Patrick's Athletic	Total		63	12	6	2	—		3	1	1	0	73	15
Rhode Island	2024	USL Championship	28	2	1	0	—		—		3 (Note: Appearances in the 2024 USL Championship Playoffs)	0	32	2
One Knoxville	2025	USL League One	15	4	2	1	2	0	—		1 (Note: Appearance in the 2025 USL League One Playoffs)	0	20	5
Drogheda United	2026	LOI Premier Division	34	11	3	3	—		—		2 (Note: 1 appearance in the Leinster Senior Cup; 1 appearance, 1 goal in the 2026 League of Ireland play-offs)	1	39	15
Total			266	76	19	8	5	1	3	1	14	1	307	87

== Honours ==
=== Club ===
Drogheda United

- League of Ireland First Division: 2020

St Patrick's Athletic

- FAI Cup: 2023

One Knoxville

- USL League One: 2025

=== Individual ===
- PFAI First Division Player of the Year: 2020
- PFAI First Division Team of the Year: 2020
- Drogheda United Supporters' Player of the Year: 2020
