= Barry Cotter (footballer) =

Irish footballer (born 1998)

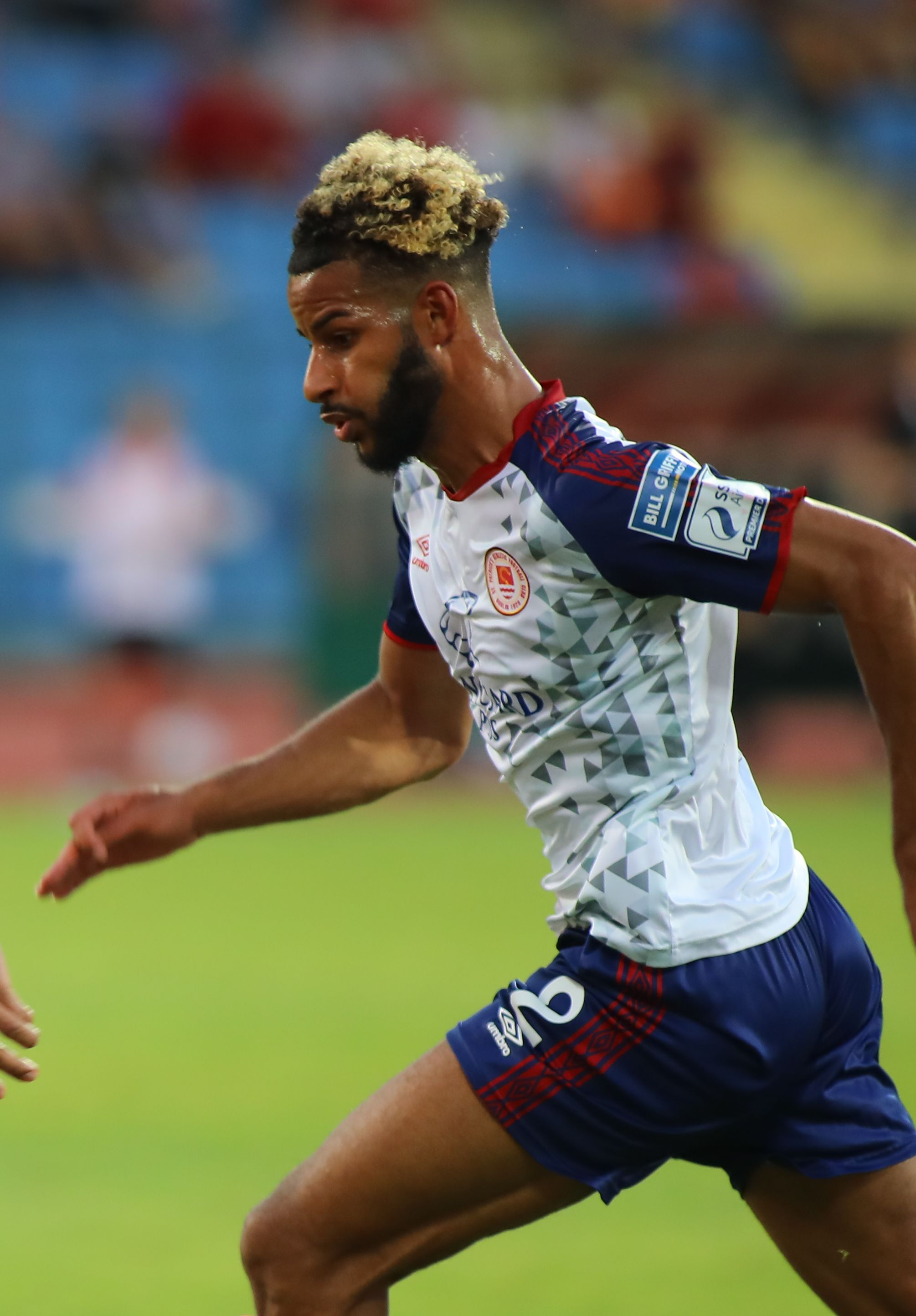
- Cotter in action for St Patrick's Athletic in 2022.

Personal information
- Full name: Barry Noel Cotter
- Date of birth: 4 December 1998 (age 27)
- Place of birth: Ennis, Ireland
- Height: 1.84 m (6 ft 0 in)
- Position: Right back

Team information
- Current team: CSKA Sofia
- Number: 37

Youth career
- Lifford
- Avenue United
- –2015: Ennis Town
- 2015–2017: Limerick

Senior career*
Years	Team	Apps	(Gls)
2017–2018	Limerick	11	(0)
2018–2021	Ipswich Town	2	(0)
2019	→ Chelmsford City (loan)	2	(0)
2020–2021	→ Chelmsford City (loan)	6	(0)
2021–2023	Shamrock Rovers	24	(1)
2022	→ St Patrick's Athletic (loan)	11	(2)
2023–2026	Barnsley	63	(3)
2025–2026	→ Notts County (loan)	9	(0)
2026	Derry City	25	(2)
2026–	CSKA Sofia	7	(0)

International career^{‡}
2017	Republic of Ireland U19	2	(0)
- * Club domestic league appearances and goals as of 18:02, 22 November 2026 (UTC) ‡ National team caps and goals as of 15:07, 14 September 2021 (UTC)

Barry Noel Cotter (born 4 December 1998) is an Irish professional footballer who plays as a right back or right wing-back for First Professional Football League club CSKA Sofia.

== Club career ==
=== Limerick ===
Cotter signed for Limerick in August 2015, having previously played for local Ennis club Lifford AFC, Avenue United and Ennis Town. He worked his way up through the youth system at Markets Field, and managed to break into the first team in 2017. He made 11 appearances during the 2017 League of Ireland season.

=== Ipswich Town ===
On 31 January 2018, Cotter signed a three-and-a-half-year deal with English Championship club Ipswich Town for an undisclosed fee. Although a member of Ipswich's under-23 squad, Cotter made his first team debut on 10 April 2018, in a 1–0 win over Barnsley at Portman Road. He made one further appearance during the 2017–18 season, appearing as a late substitute during a 4–0 win over Reading at the Madejski Stadium on 28 April 2018. Cotter left Ipswich on 22 March 2021 after being told he wouldn't be offered a new contract.

==== Chelmsford City (loans) ====
On 26 September 2019, Cotter signed for National League South club Chelmsford City on a one-month loan deal. He made his debut for the club in a 0–4 away win over Eastbourne Borough on 28 September. On 16 October 2020, Cotter returned to Chelmsford, on loan until 2 January 2021.

=== Shamrock Rovers ===
Cotter signed for League of Ireland Premier Division club Shamrock Rovers on 31 August 2021. He scored his first goal for Shamrock Rovers against UCD on 19 May 2022.

==== St Patrick's Athletic (loan) ====
On 20 July 2022, Cotter signed for St Patrick's Athletic on loan until the end of the season. He made his debut for the club a day later in a 1–1 draw with Slovenian side NŠ Mura in the UEFA Europa Conference League. On 29 August 2022, Cotter scored his first goal for the club in a 3–1 win away to Bohemians at Dalymount Park, picking up the ball on the halfway line before beating four players on his way to finding the net to open the scoring in the 8th minute of the match. On 3 October 2022, he scored in a 4–4 draw away to rivals Shelbourne at Tolka Park.

=== Barnsley ===
On 18 January 2023, it was announced that Cotter had signed for EFL League One club Barnsley on a 3 1/2-year deal for a fee in the region of £20,000. Cotter scored his first goal for the club on 15 August 2023, in a 3–1 loss against Peterborough United at Oakwell.

==== Notts County (loan) ====
On 4 July 2025, he joined EFL League Two side Notts County on a season long loan deal.

=== Derry City ===
On 23 February 2026, it was announced that Cotter had signed for League of Ireland Premier Division club Derry City on a permanent basis on a one-year-contract. He made 30 appearances in all competitions during his time with the club, scoring twice before departing in September 2026.

=== CSKA Sofia ===
On 8 September 2026, Cotter signed for Bulgarian First League side CSKA Sofia on a three-year contract for an undisclosed fee, having impressed when playing against them in the UEFA Europa League two months earlier.

== International career ==
Cotter made his International debut for the Republic of Ireland U19 team on 10 February 2017, in a 2–1 loss to Norway. He won 2 caps for Ireland's under-19's in 2017.

He was called up to the Republic of Ireland U21 squad in March 2019, for a 2019 UEFA European Under-21 Championship qualifying match against Luxembourg. He was an unused substitute in the qualifier which took place on 24 March 2019 in Dublin, with Ireland emerging as 3–0 winners.

== Career statistics ==
As of match played 22 November 2026

Appearances and goals by club, season and competition
Club	Season	League			National Cup		League Cup		Other		Total	
Club	Season	Division	Apps	Goals	Apps	Goals	Apps	Goals	Apps	Goals	Apps	Goals
Limerick	2017	LOI Premier Division	11	0	1	0	1	0	—		13	0
Ipswich Town	2017–18	Championship	2	0	0	0	0	0	—		2	0
Ipswich Town	2018–19	Championship	0	0	0	0	0	0	—		0	0
Ipswich Town	2019–20	League One	0	0	1	0	0	0	1 (Note: Appearances in the EFL Trophy)	0	2	0
Ipswich Town	2020–21	League One	0	0	0	0	0	0	0	0	0	0
Ipswich Town	Total		2	0	1	0	0	0	1	0	4	0
Chelmsford City (loan)	2019–20	National League South	2	0	0	0	—		1 (Note: Appearance in the Essex Senior Cup)	0	3	0
Chelmsford City (loan)	2020–21	National League South	6	0	0	0	—		1 (Note: Appearance in the FA Trophy)	0	7	0
Shamrock Rovers	2021	LOI Premier Division	9	0	—		—		—		9	0
Shamrock Rovers	2022	LOI Premier Division	15	1	—		—		1 (Note: Appearance in the President of Ireland's Cup)	0	16	1
Shamrock Rovers	Total		24	1	—		—		1	0	25	1
St Patrick's Athletic (loan)	2022	LOI Premier Division	11	2	1	0	—		4 (Note: Appearances in the UEFA Europa Conference League)	0	16	2
Barnsley	2022–23	League One	6	0	—		—		0	0	6	0
Barnsley	2023–24	League One	35	3	1	0	1	0	3 (Note: 1 appearance in the League One Playoffs & 2 appearances, 1 goal in the EFL Trophy)	1	40	4
Barnsley	2024–25	League One	20	0	1	0	3	0	1	0	25	0
Barnsley	2025–26	League One	0	0	—		—		—		0	0
Barnsley	Total		61	3	2	0	4	0	4	1	71	4
Notts County (loan)	2025–26	League Two	9	0	0	0	1	0	0	0	10	0
Derry City	2026	LOI Premier Division	25	2	1	0	—		4 (Note: 2 appearances in the UEFA Europa League; 1 appearance in the UEFA Conference League)	0	30	2
CSKA Sofia	2026–27	First League	7	0	1	0	—		0	0	8	0
Career total			158	7	7	0	6	0	16	1	187	9

== Honours ==
Shamrock Rovers

- League of Ireland Premier Division: 2021
- President of Ireland's Cup: 2022

CSKA Sofia

- Bulgarian Supercup: 2026
