= Joe Redmond (footballer) =

Irish footballer (born 2000)

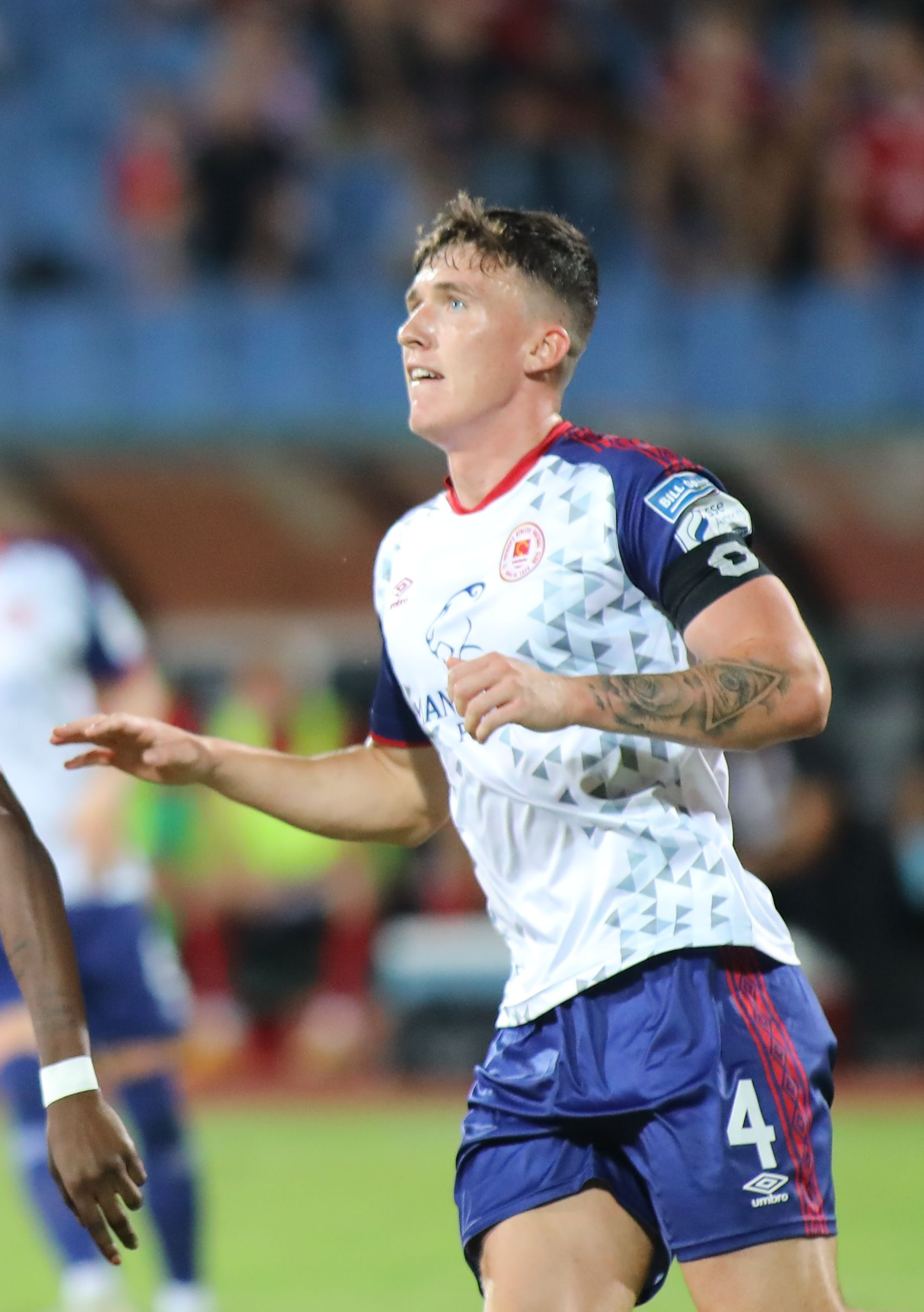
- Redmond in action for St Patrick's Athletic in 2022.

Personal information
- Full name: Joseph Patrick Redmond
- Date of birth: 23 January 2000 (age 26)
- Place of birth: Kilnamanagh, Ireland
- Height: 1.83 m (6 ft 0 in)
- Position: Defender

Team information
- Current team: St Patrick's Athletic
- Number: 4

Youth career
- Kilnamanagh
- Crumlin United
- –2016: St Joseph's Boys
- 2016–2021: Birmingham City

Senior career*
Years	Team	Apps	(Gls)
2018–2021	Birmingham City	0	(0)
2020	→ Cork City (loan)	5	(0)
2021	Drogheda United	13	(1)
2022–	St Patrick's Athletic	160	(11)

International career^{‡}
2016	Republic of Ireland U16	2	(0)
2017	Republic of Ireland U17	1	(0)
2017	Republic of Ireland U18	2	(0)
2022	Republic of Ireland U21	2	(0)
- * Club domestic league appearances and goals as of 23:44, 30 October 2026 (UTC) ‡ National team caps and goals as of 23:43, 27 September 2022 (UTC)

Joseph Patrick Redmond (born 23 January 2000) is an Irish professional footballer who plays as a defender for League of Ireland Premier Division club St Patrick's Athletic.

== Club career ==
=== Youth career ===
A native of Tallaght, County Dublin, Redmond began playing with his local side Kilnamanagh, before moving to top Dublin academy Crumlin United and before moving to St Joseph's Boys. While at St Joseph's Boys, he was part of a formidable side that included fellow future professional footballers Aaron Bolger, Brandon Kavanagh, Jonathan Afolabi, Andy Lyons, Promise Omochere, Ryan Burke and Max Murphy among others. In 2016, Redmond had agreed to sign for the under-17 side of League of Ireland club St Patrick's Athletic, but he instead signed for EFL Championship side Birmingham City in July 2016, starting out in their Academy.

=== Birmingham City ===
==== Academy ====
On 23 June 2018, Redmond signed his first professional contract with Birmingham City, signing a one-year contract, with the option of another year. He signed a new two-year contract with the club on 27 June 2019 following an impressive first professional season with the club's reserve side. Redmond's first involvement in a matchday squad with the first team came on 6 August 2019 when he was an unused substitute in an EFL Cup game away to Portsmouth. During his time with the club, he was a teammate of future Real Madrid star Jude Bellingham.

==== Cork City loan ====
On 31 January 2020, Redmond was loaned out to League of Ireland Premier Division club Cork City until 30 June 2020. He made his debut for the club on 14 February 2020 in the opening game of the season as his side lost 1–0 to Shelbourne at Turners Cross. He featured in each of the clubs opening 5 games, losing 4 and winning 1 game before season came to a halt due to the COVID-19 pandemic.

==== Return from loan ====
On 22 May 2020, Redmond was recalled from his loan spell with the League of Ireland on a break due to the COVID-19 pandemic. Redmond became captain of the club's Under-23 team upon his return from loan. On 17 May 2021, it was announced by the club that Redmond was among the list of players that would not be retained by the club following the end of their contracts. A few days after learning of his upcoming release by the club, he scored a 117th minute volley to help his side to a 2–1 win over Bristol City in the Professional Development League semi-final at Ashton Gate Stadium. On 24 May 2021, Redmond opened the scoring in a 2–0 win over Sheffield United at Bramall Lane to lift the Professional Development League trophy as captain on what was his last game for the club.

=== Drogheda United ===
On 11 August 2021, Redmond signed for League of Ireland Premier Division club Drogheda United until the end of the season. He made his debut for the club on 15 August 2021 in a 1–0 loss at home to Shamrock Rovers. Redmond scored his first goal in senior football on 11 September 2021 in a 3–2 win at home to Bohemians. Over the season, Redmond made a total of 13 appearances, scoring 1 goal as his side avoided relegation by finishing in 7th place in their first season back in the League of Ireland Premier Division.

=== St Patrick's Athletic ===
==== 2022 season ====
Redmond followed Drogheda United manager Tim Clancy in signing for Dublin club St Patrick's Athletic on 18 December 2021 ahead of their 2022 season. Upon signing for the club, Redmond revealed that he grew up as a fan of the club and attended the recent 2021 FAI Cup Final as a fan in the Pat's end of the ground. On 11 February 2022, Redmond made his debut for the club in the 2022 President of Ireland's Cup against Shamrock Rovers at Tallaght Stadium, as his side lost 5–4 on penalties after a 1–1 draw. On 18 February 2022, Redmond made his league debut for the club in a 3–0 win over rivals Shelbourne at Tolka Park. He was voted as Player of the Month by the club's fans for the month of March 2022. On 8 April 2022, he was named as Man of the Match by RTÉ Sport for his performance in his side's 0–0 draw with Dundalk at Richmond Park. He was voted the club's Player of the Month for the second month running for April 2022. Redmond's early form with the club was rewarded with a contract extension when it was announced on 12 May 2022 that he had signed a new long-term contract with the club after remaining an ever present in a defence that kept 8 clean sheets in the first 15 games of the season. Redmond scored his first goal for the club on 20 May 2022 against Shelbourne in a Dublin derby. Redmond made his first appearance in European football on 21 July 2022, captaining the side in a 1–1 draw with Slovenian side NŠ Mura in the UEFA Europa Conference League. In the second leg a week later, he scored the winning penalty in the shootout as Pat's advanced 6–5 on penalties after a 0–0 draw to earn a tie with Bulgarian side CSKA Sofia in the next round. Mid-way through the season, he was made captain of the side following club captain Ian Bermingham being left out the team on a regular basis. At the club's awards night, it was revealed that Redmond had been voted by supporters as the Player of the Year following an excellent first season at the club.

==== 2023 season ====
Redmond started off the 2023 season off to a goalscoring start on 17 February 2023, scoring an 89th-minute equaliser in a 1–1 draw with Derry City in the opening game of the season at Richmond Park. On 10 April 2023 in a 3–1 win away to his former club Drogheda United, Redmond was forced off in the 64th minute due to a hamstring injury that would require surgery and would keep him out of action for several months, with the injury ending his run of playing every minute of every match since he joined the club. He made his return to the side on 23 July 2023, coming off the bench in a 2–1 win away to Longford Town in the FAI Cup, after missing 18 consecutive games during his time out injured. On 25 August 2023, Redmond scored the only goal of the game in a 1–0 win over UCD at the UCD Bowl, heading home a Jake Mulraney corner in the 43rd minute. On 12 November 2023, Redmond became the fourth St Patrick's Athletic captain in history to lift the FAI Cup, as his side beat Bohemians 3–1 in the 2023 FAI Cup Final, in front of a record breaking FAI Cup Final crowd of 43,881 at the Aviva Stadium.

==== 2024 season ====
On 18 December 2023, Redmond signed a new long-term contract with the club. On 5 April 2024, he scored his first goal of the season when he headed home an equaliser from a Brandon Kavanagh free kick in a 2–1 win over rivals Shamrock Rovers at Richmond Park. On 25 July 2024, he scored the first European goal of his career when he headed Chris Forrester's free kick into the bottom right corner in the 77th minute of his side's 3–1 win over Vaduz of Liechtenstein in the UEFA Conference League. At the end of the season he was voted into the PFAI Premier Division Team of the Year for the second time in his career by his fellow professionals across the league.

==== 2025 season ====
Redmond scored his first goal of the 2025 season on 18 April by heading home Jake Mulraney's cross in the 91st minute to earn his side a 2–2 draw at home to Shamrock Rovers, just 3 minutes after conceding a second goal to the visitors. On 31 July 2025, he scored a 91st-minute goal to force extra time away to Estonian side Nõmme Kalju in the UEFA Conference League, before his side went on to score again in extra time to earn a Third Qualifying round tie with Turkish giants Beşiktaş. On 22 September 2025, he opened the scoring with a 7th-minute header in a 4–0 win at home to Cork City at Richmond Park.

==== 2026 season ====
Redmond had to wait until 19 June 2026 to score his first goal of the 2026 season, heading home a Seán Hoare cross to give his side the lead in the 93rd minute of an eventual 2–0 win over Sligo Rovers at Richmond Park. Redmond was voted into the 2026 PFAI Team of the Year by his fellow players in the league, alongside 3 of his St Patrick's Athletic teammates, Redmond's third time being voted into the side in his career.

== International career ==
Redmond has played for the Ireland at U16, U17 & U18 level. In March 2022, he was called up to the Republic of Ireland U21 squad by manager Jim Crawford for their qualifier away to Sweden U21. On 15 September 2022, Redmond was called up to the U21 squad for their 2023 UEFA European Under-21 Championship Qualification Play-off games against Israel U21. He made his debut for the U21s on 23 September 2022 in a 1–1 draw with Israel U21 in the first leg at Tallaght Stadium, drawing praise from manager Jim Crawford after the match, stating "Joe was excellent, it's the way he plays at his club, he was a rock and I knew, I had no qualms at all. He's captain at his club, a young captain and he had a big performance for us."

== Personal life ==
Redmond comes from a footballing family with several of his relatives having played the game at a professional level. His cousins Stephen Quinn (who also played for St Patrick's Athletic), Alan Quinn and Keith Quinn and his cousin once removed Ben Quinn have all played professionally in England. Redmond grew up as a fan of St Patrick's Athletic, watching fellow centre backs Kenny Browne and Conor Kenna during the club's 2013 league winning season.

== Career statistics ==
As of match played 30 October 2026

Appearances and goals by club, season and competition
Club	Season	League			National Cup		League Cup		Europe		Other		Total	
Club	Season	Division	Apps	Goals	Apps	Goals	Apps	Goals	Apps	Goals	Apps	Goals	Apps	Goals
Birmingham City	2018–19	EFL Championship	0	0	0	0	0	0	—		—		0	0
Birmingham City	2019–20	EFL Championship	0	0	0	0	0	0	—		—		0	0
Birmingham City	2020–21	EFL Championship	0	0	0	0	0	0	—		—		0	0
Birmingham City	Total		0	0	0	0	0	0	—		—		0	0
Cork City (loan)	2020	LOI Premier Division	5	0	—		—		—		—		5	0
Drogheda United	2021	LOI Premier Division	13	1	—		—		—		—		13	1
St Patrick's Athletic	2022	LOI Premier Division	36	1	1	0	—		4 (Note: Appearances in the UEFA Europa Conference League)	0	1 (Note: Appearance in the President of Ireland's Cup)	0	42	1
St Patrick's Athletic	2023	LOI Premier Division	20	3	5	0	—		0	0	0 (Note: Appearances in the Leinster Senior Cup)	0	25	3
St Patrick's Athletic	2024	LOI Premier Division	32	4	1	0	—		6 (Note: Appearance(s) in the UEFA Conference League)	1	2 (Note: 1 appearance in the President of Ireland's Cup & 1 appearance in the Leinster Senior Cup)	0	41	5
St Patrick's Athletic	2025	LOI Premier Division	36	2	3	0	—		6	1	2	0	47	3
St Patrick's Athletic	2026	LOI Premier Division	36	1	3	0	—		—		0	0	39	1
St Patrick's Athletic	Total		160	11	13	0	—		16	2	5	0	194	13
Career total			178	12	13	0	0	0	16	2	5	0	212	14

== Honours ==
St Patrick's Athletic

- FAI Cup (1): 2023
- Leinster Senior Cup (1): 2023–24

=== Individual ===
- St Patrick's Athletic Player of the Year (1): 2022
- PFAI Team of the Year (3): 2022, 2024, 2026
