= Kian Corbally =

Irish footballer (born 2003)

Personal information
- Date of birth: 31 December 2003 (age 22)
- Place of birth: Dublin, Republic of Ireland
- Height: 1.73 m (5 ft 8 in)
- Position: Midfielder

Team information
- Current team: Dunfermline Athletic
- Number: 18

Youth career
- –2017: Crumlin United
- 2018–2022: St Patrick's Athletic

Senior career*
Years	Team	Apps	(Gls)
2019–2022	St Patrick's Athletic	1	(0)
2022	→ Longford Town (loan)	11	(0)
2023–2024	Wexford	64	(5)
2025–2026	Ballymena United	50	(7)
2026–	Dunfermline Athletic	5	(1)

International career^{‡}
2021–2022	Republic of Ireland U19	5	(0)
- * Club domestic league appearances and goals as of 14:47, 1 November 2026 (UTC) ‡ National team caps and goals as of 21:50, 22 June 2026 (UTC)

Kian Corbally (born 31 December 2003) is an Irish professional footballer who plays as a midfielder for Scottish Championship club Dunfermline Athletic. His previous clubs are St Patrick's Athletic, Longford Town, Wexford and Ballymena United.

== Club career ==
=== Youth career ===
Corbally came through the Crumlin United academy, before joining the academy of League of Ireland club St Patrick's Athletic at Under-15 level in 2018. He won the Under-15 league title in his first full season with the club. In October 2019, he was part of the under 17 team that won the 2019 league title, beating Bohemians 4–0 in the final at Dalymount Park. On 22 December 2020, Corbally played in the League of Ireland U19 Division Final, in a 2–1 win over Bohemians after extra time at the UCD Bowl to secure a UEFA Youth League spot for the club. He made his UEFA Youth League debut on 29 September 2021 in a 2–1 loss to Serbian side Red Star Belgrade. He was part of the side that won the League of Ireland U19 Division in 2022.

=== St Patrick's Athletic ===
He made his senior debut for St Patrick's Athletic on 1 November 2019 in a Leinster Senior Cup Semi-Final tie away to Sheriff YC, with Corbally replacing Ben McCormack from the bench in a Pats team made up of academy players, before scoring the final goal of the game in the 118th minute of a 3–1 win after extra time, at age 15 years 305 days old he become the club's youngest ever goalscorer at senior level in the process at the time (a record that has since overtaken by Mason Melia). On 16 November 2019, he started in the Final of the 2018–19 Leinster Senior Cup, as his side defeated Athlone Town 4–0 at Richmond Park. On 19 November 2021, Corbally made his League of Ireland Premier Division debut for the club, replacing Jamie Lennon from the bench in the final game of the season, a 0–0 draw away to Waterford at the RSC.

==== Longford Town loan ====
Having failed to make an appearance in the 2022 season, Corbally was loaned out to League of Ireland First Division club Longford Town until the end of the season in order to gain first team experience. He made a total of 14 appearances for the club during his loan spell.

=== Wexford ===
Corbally signed for League of Ireland First Division club Wexford ahead of the 2023 season. He scored 2 goals in 35 appearances in all competitions in his first season with the club, before signing a new contract for the 2024 season, despite reported interest from Millwall, Derby County and Newport County. Corbally scored a total of 5 goals in 77 appearances in all competitions in his two seasons with the club, including a run to the Semi-Final of the 2024 FAI Cup.

=== Ballymena United ===
In January 2025, Corbally signed for NIFL Premiership club Ballymena United. In May 2025, he signed a new two-year contract with the club and in January 2026, he drew reported interest from Scottish Premiership, EFL League One and EFL League Two clubs. He scored 7 goals in 58 appearances in all competitions during his 18 months with the club before departing in June 2026.

=== Dunfermline Athletic ===
On 18 June 2026, Corbally signed a two-year contract with the option of a third year, with Scottish Championship side Dunfermline Athletic for an undisclosed fee.

== International career ==
Corbally made his international debut on 11 October 2021, playing the full 90 minutes for the Republic of Ireland U19 side in a 1–1 draw with Sweden U19 in a friendly in Marbella, Spain.

== Career statistics ==
As of match played on 31 October 2026

Appearances and goals by club, season and competition
Club	Season	League			National Cup (Note: Includes FAI Cup, Irish Cup & Scottish Cup)		League Cup (Note: Includes Northern Ireland Football League Cup & Scottish League Cup)		Europe		Other		Total	
Club	Season	Division	Apps	Goals	Apps	Goals	Apps	Goals	Apps	Goals	Apps	Goals	Apps	Goals
St Patrick's Athletic	2019	LOI Premier Division	0	0	0	0	0	0	0 (Note: Appearances in the UEFA Europa League)	0	2 (Note: Appearance(s) in the Leinster Senior Cup)	1	2	1
St Patrick's Athletic	2020	LOI Premier Division	0	0	0	0	—		—		—		0	0
St Patrick's Athletic	2021	LOI Premier Division	1	0	1	0	—		—		—		2	0
St Patrick's Athletic	2022	LOI Premier Division	0	0	0	0	—		0 (Note: Appearances in the UEFA Europa Conference League)	0	0 (Note: Appearance in the President of Ireland's Cup)	0	0	0
St Patrick's Athletic	Total		1	0	1	0	0	0	0	0	2	1	4	1
Longford Town (loan)	2022	LOI First Division	11	0	1	0	—		—		2 (Note: Appearances in the 2022 League of Ireland First Division Playoffs)	0	14	0
Wexford	2023	LOI First Division	29	2	3	0	—		—		3 (Note: 1 appearance in the Leinster Senior Cup; 2 appearances in the 2023 League of Ireland First Division Playoffs)	0	35	2
Wexford	2024	LOI First Division	35	3	4	0	—		—		3 (Note: 1 appearance in the Leinster Senior Cup; 2 appearances in the 2024 League of Ireland First Division Playoffs)	0	42	3
Wexford	Total		64	5	7	0	—		—		6	0	77	5
Ballymena United	2024–25	NIFL Premiership	16	2	—		—		—		—		16	2
Ballymena United	2025–26	NIFL Premiership	34	5	1	0	4	0	—		3 (Note: Appearances in the County Antrim Shield)	0	42	5
Ballymena United	Total		50	7	1	0	4	0	—		3	0	58	7
Dunfermline Athletic	2026–27	Scottish Championship	5	1	0	0	4	0	—		0	0	9	1
Career total			131	13	10	0	8	0	0	0	13	1	162	14

== Honours ==
St Patrick's Athletic

- FAI Cup: 2021
- Leinster Senior Cup: 2018–19
