= Ganiyu Owolabi =

Nigerian footballer

Personal information
- Date of birth: 10 May 1973 (age 53)
- Place of birth: Ilorih, Nigeria
- Height: 1.80 m (5 ft 11 in)

Senior career*
Years	Team	Apps	(Gls)
- Buffalo FC
1995–2000	Antwerp		
1997	→ Viking (loan)	4	(0)
2000–2002	Al-Wasl		
2002–2004	Dender		
2004	Berchem Sport		
2004–2005	Ethnikos Asteras		
- * Club domestic league appearances and goals

Ganiyu Owolabi (born 10 May 1973) is a Nigerian former professional footballer who played as a midfielder.

== Career ==
Born in Ilorih, Owolabi played for Buffalo FC, Antwerp, Viking, Al-Wasl, Dender, Berchem Sport and Ethnikos Asteras.

== Personal life ==
His son Tunde Owolabi is also a footballer.
