= Ben McCormack =

Irish footballer (born 2003)

Personal information
- Date of birth: 4 April 2003 (age 23)
- Place of birth: Dublin, Republic of Ireland
- Height: 1.80 m (5 ft 11 in)
- Position: Midfielder

Team information
- Current team: Bray Wanderers
- Number: 18

Youth career
- –2017: Belvedere
- 2017–2022: St Patrick's Athletic

Senior career*
Years	Team	Apps	(Gls)
2019–2023	St Patrick's Athletic	64	(3)
2024–2025	Waterford	41	(2)
2025	→ Wexford (loan)	13	(1)
2026–	Bray Wanderers	31	(13)

International career^{‡}
2018	Republic of Ireland U15	4	(0)
2018–2019	Republic of Ireland U16	7	(2)
2019–2020	Republic of Ireland U17	5	(3)
2021	Republic of Ireland U19	2	(0)
- * Club domestic league appearances and goals as of 15:50, 12 November 2026 (UTC) ‡ National team caps and goals as of 23:11, 13 August 2023 (UTC)

Ben McCormack (born 4 April 2003) is an Irish professional footballer who plays as a midfielder for League of Ireland First Division club Bray Wanderers. His previous clubs are St Patrick's Athletic, Waterford and Wexford.

== Club career ==
=== Youth career ===
A native of Harmonstown, Dublin, McCormack started out with top Dublin academy Belvedere, where he earned the opportunity to play for the DDSL representative side at the prestigious Kennedy Cup in 2017, in which he played a starring role in the final as his side won the competition. He moved to the academy of League of Ireland club St Patrick's Athletic in November 2017. His first season with the club saw him winning the league and cup double with the under 15 side. In October 2019, he was part of the under 17 team that won the 2019 league title, beating Bohemians 4–0 in the final at Dalymount Park with McCormack scoring twice at Dalymount Park. On 22 December 2020, he played in the League of Ireland U19 Division Final, in a 2–1 win over Bohemians after extra time at the UCD Bowl to secure a UEFA Youth League spot for the club. McCormack made his UEFA Youth League debut on 29 September 2021, scoring his side's goal in a 2–1 loss to Serbian side Crvena Zvezda. He was part of the side that won the League of Ireland U19 Division in 2022.

=== St Patrick's Athletic ===
==== 2019 season ====
He made his senior debut for St Patrick's Athletic on 1 November 2019 in a Leinster Senior Cup Semi-Final tie away to Sheriff YC, with McCormack in the starting 11 of a game in which a Pats team made up of academy players won 3–1 after extra time. On 21 December 2019, McCormack signed his first professional contract with the club, signing a 2-year contract until the end of 2021.

==== 2020 season ====
On 26 September 2020, McCormack made his League of Ireland Premier Division debut when he replaced Darragh Markey from the bench in the 75th minute of a 2–0 win over Shelbourne. With the season shortened due to COVID-19, his only other appearance of the season came on 28 October 2020, coming off the bench for a late cameo in a 3–2 loss away to Finn Harps.

==== 2021 season ====
The 2021 season proved to be his breakthrough season in senior football, starting his first senior game for the club on 20 April 2021 in a 1–0 win over Waterford at Richmond Park. On 6 July 2021, McCormack signed a long-term contract extension with the club, alongside teammate Darragh Burns. His first goal in senior football came on 22 July 2021, when he headed home an Ian Bermingham cross to put his side 3 goals up in an eventual 6–0 win over Bray Wanderers in the first round of the FAI Cup. With McCormack proving to be a key player off the bench for his club, making 26 appearances in all competitions over the season, he damaged his ankle ligaments playing for the Republic of Ireland U19's in October 2021, which ultimately resulted in him missing the 2021 FAI Cup Final which his side won on penalties against Bohemians at the Aviva Stadium on 28 November 2021.

==== 2022 season ====
McCormack's progress stalled at the beginning of the 2022 season under new manager Tim Clancy, having to wait until 1 April 2022 for his first appearance for the first team, while returning to play games with the club's under 19 side. On 18 April 2022, McCormack replaced Jason McClelland from the bench in the 72nd minute away to UCD with his side trailing by a goal, he scored the equaliser 3 minutes later before assisting the winning goal with a cross from a corner in the 89th minute of a 2–1 victory. On 6 November 2022, he scored the final goal in a 4–0 win over Shelbourne in the last game of the season.

==== 2023 season ====
Having made just 4 appearances in the club's first 11 games of the season under Tim Clancy, McCormack regained his place in the team under newly appointed manager Jon Daly and on 15 May 2023, he scored his first goal of the season, scoring an 84th-minute equaliser 11 minutes after entering the pitch in a 3–2 loss to Shamrock Rovers at Tallaght Stadium. On 2 June 2023, he picked up 3 assists in the same game, all coming from corner kick deliveries, in a 3–1 win away to UCD at the UCD Bowl. His form under Daly saw him among the nominees for the League of Ireland Player of the Month award for June 2023, although he eventually lost out to Patrick Hoban. On 12 July 2023, McCormack made his first appearance in European competition in a 2–1 loss against F91 Dudelange in the first qualifying round of the UEFA Europa Conference League at the Stade Jos Nosbaum. On 12 November 2023, McCormack was part of the squad for the 2023 FAI Cup Final, as his side produced a 3–1 win over Bohemians in front of a record breaking FAI Cup Final crowd of 43,881 at the Aviva Stadium. He struggled for consistent game time, featuring in 22 of the club's 36 league games, with just 8 of those coming in the starting team and only 1 start in the second half of the season. This lack of minutes saw him linked with a move to Dundalk.

=== Waterford ===
On 29 December 2023, it was announced that McCormack had signed for newly promoted Waterford for an undisclosed fee. He scored 4 goals in 33 appearances in all competitions in his first season with the club, before signing a new 1-year contract with the club on 13 November 2024.

==== Wexford loan ====
Having fallen out of favour at Waterford, on 17 July 2025 McCormack was loaned out to League of Ireland First Division club Wexford until the end of the season, in search of regular first team football.

=== Bray Wanderers ===
On 13 February 2026, McCormack joined League of Ireland First Division side Bray Wanderers. He scored his first goal for the club on 13 March 2026, in a 2–1 victory at a home to UCD at the Carlisle Grounds. After an impressive start to his career with Bray, McCormack was named League of Ireland First Division player of the month for March. On 8 May 2026, McCormack scored his first career hat-trick, giving his side a 3–0 half time lead in an eventual 5–1 win at home to Cobh Ramblers. A week later, McCormack scored twice in the opening 10 minutes to give Bray an early 2–0 lead in an eventual 4–3 win away to UCD. On 17 June, McCormack scored another brace including a free-kick to lead Bray to a 5–2 win at home to Longford Town. On 7 August, McCormack scored his 10th goal of the season with a chipped finish in a 5–0 win for Bray at home to Finn Harps, this made McCormack the first midfielder to reach a double-digit goal tally for Bray since Gary McCabe in 2017.

== International career ==
McCormack has represented the Republic of Ireland at U15, U16, U17 and U19 level. He made his debut for the Republic of Ireland U15 team on 6 March 2018, in a 2–0 win over Cyprus U15 in a friendly at Oriel Park. He scored on his debut for the Republic of Ireland U16 team on 11 September 2018, opening the scoring in a 4–2 win away to Bulgaria U16 in Sofia. He was part of the U16 squad that took part in the 2018 Victory Shield in November 2018. He was voted the Under-16 International Player of the Year for 2019 at the FAI International Football Awards. McCormack scored on his debut for the Republic of Ireland U17s in a 2–0 win over Russia U17 at the Estadi Olímpic Camilo Cano in Spain. His debut for the U19s came in a 2–2 draw with Sweden U19.

== Career statistics ==
As of match played on 1 November 2026

Appearances and goals by club, season and competition
Club	Season	League			National Cup		Europe		Other		Total	
Club	Season	Division	Apps	Goals	Apps	Goals	Apps	Goals	Apps	Goals	Apps	Goals
St Patrick's Athletic	2019	LOI Premier Division	0	0	0	0	0 (Note: Appearances in the UEFA Europa League)	0	1 (Note: Appearance(s) in the Leinster Senior Cup)	0	1	0
St Patrick's Athletic	2020	LOI Premier Division	2	0	0	0	—		—		2	0
St Patrick's Athletic	2021	LOI Premier Division	23	0	3	1	—		—		26	1
St Patrick's Athletic	2022	LOI Premier Division	17	2	0	0	0 (Note: Appearances in the UEFA Europa Conference League)	0	0 (Note: Appearance in the President of Ireland's Cup)	0	17	2
St Patrick's Athletic	2023	LOI Premier Division	22	1	2	0	2	0	0	0	26	1
St Patrick's Athletic	Total		64	3	5	1	2	0	1	0	72	4
Waterford	2024	LOI Premier Division	29	2	2	0	—		2 (Note: Appearances in the Munster Senior Cup)	2	33	4
Waterford	2025	LOI Premier Division	12	0	—		—		1	0	13	0
Waterford	Total		41	2	2	0	—		3	2	46	4
Wexford (loan)	2025	LOI First Division	13	1	1	0	—		—		14	1
Bray Wanderers	2026	LOI First Division	31	13	1	0	—		3 (Note: Appearances in the 2026 League of Ireland First Division Playoffs)	1	35	14
Career total			149	19	9	1	2	0	7	3	167	23

== Honours ==
St Patrick's Athletic

- FAI Cup (2): 2021, 2023
- Leinster Senior Cup (1): 2018–19

Waterford

- Munster Senior Cup (1): 2023–24

Bray Wanderers

- Leinster Senior Cup (1): 2025–26

Individual

- FAI Under-16 International Player of the Year (1): 2019
- PFAI First Division Team of the Year (1): 2026
