= Tim Clancy =

Irish football manager

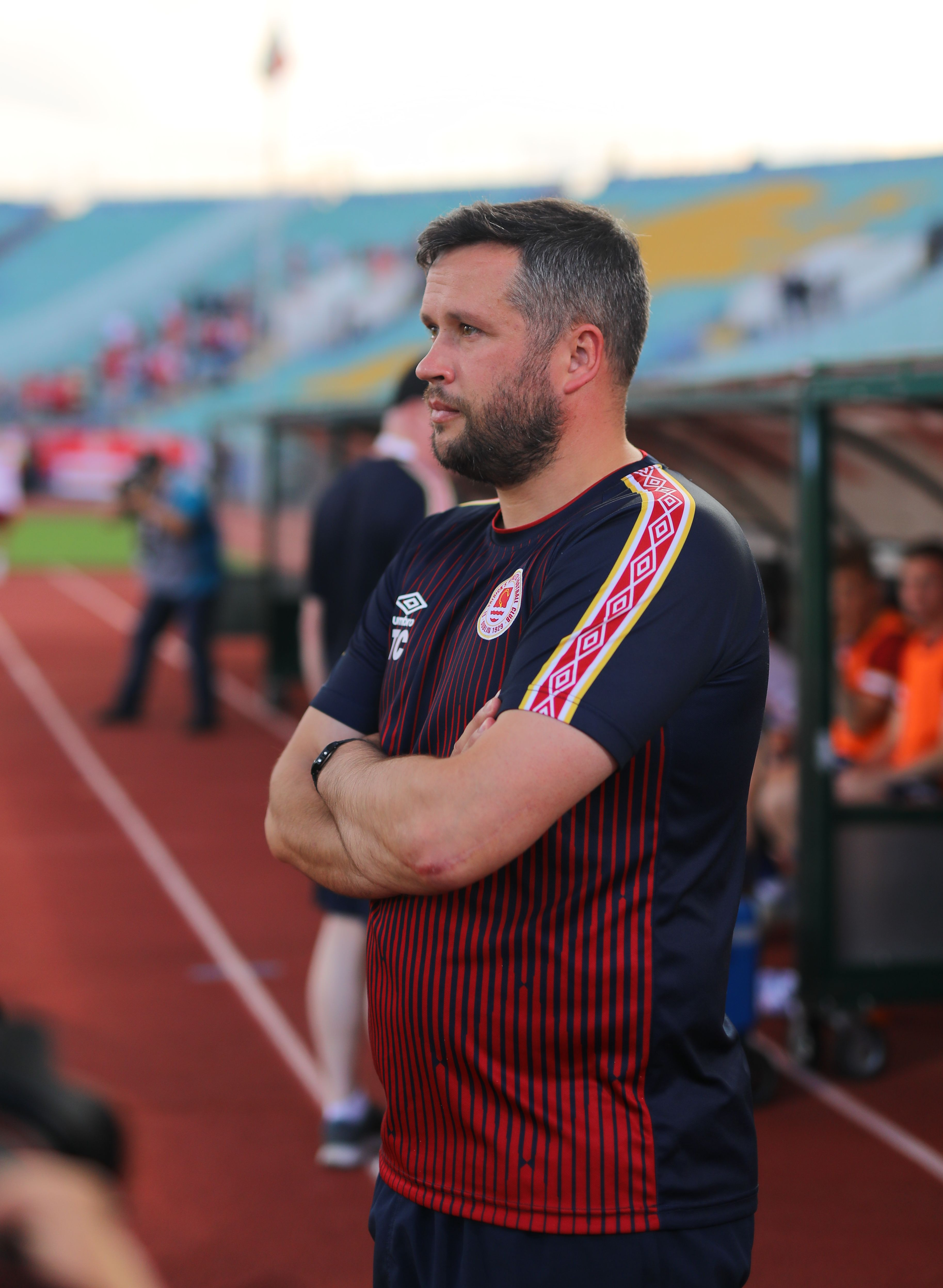
- Clancy in 2022.

Personal information
- Full name: Timothy Clancy
- Date of birth: 8 June 1984 (age 42)
- Place of birth: Trim, County Meath, Ireland
- Position: Defender

Youth career
- Trim Celtic
- Belvedere

Senior career*
Years	Team	Apps	(Gls)
2003–2004	Millwall	0	(0)
2003–2004	→ Weymouth (loan)	11	(0)
2004–2007	AFC Hornchurch		
2005–2006	→ Fisher Athletic (loan)		
2007–2011	Kilmarnock	66	(0)
2011–2012	Motherwell	26	(0)
2012–2014	Hibernian	19	(1)
2014	St Johnstone	4	(1)
2015	Shamrock Rovers	3	(0)
2015	→ Sligo Rovers (loan)	8	(1)
2016	Sligo Rovers	7	(0)
2016–2017	Bray Wanderers	36	(3)

International career
	Republic of Ireland U19	4	(0)

Managerial career
- 2017–2021: Drogheda United
- 2021–2023: St Patrick's Athletic
- 2023–2025: Cork City
- * Club domestic league appearances and goals as of 14:05, 12 May 2025 (UTC)

Tim Clancy (born 8 June 1984) is an Irish former footballer and manager. During his playing career, Clancy played for Millwall, Weymouth, AFC Hornchurch, Fisher Athletic, Kilmarnock, Motherwell, Hibernian, St Johnstone, Shamrock Rovers, Sligo Rovers and Bray Wanderers. He managed Drogheda United, St Patrick's Athletic and Cork City.

== Playing career ==
=== Early career ===
Clancy played for the Republic of Ireland under-19 team. He played for his home town club Trim Celtic and then Belvedere before signing for Millwall. He then had spells in English non-league football with Weymouth, AFC Hornchurch and Fisher Athletic.

=== Kilmarnock ===
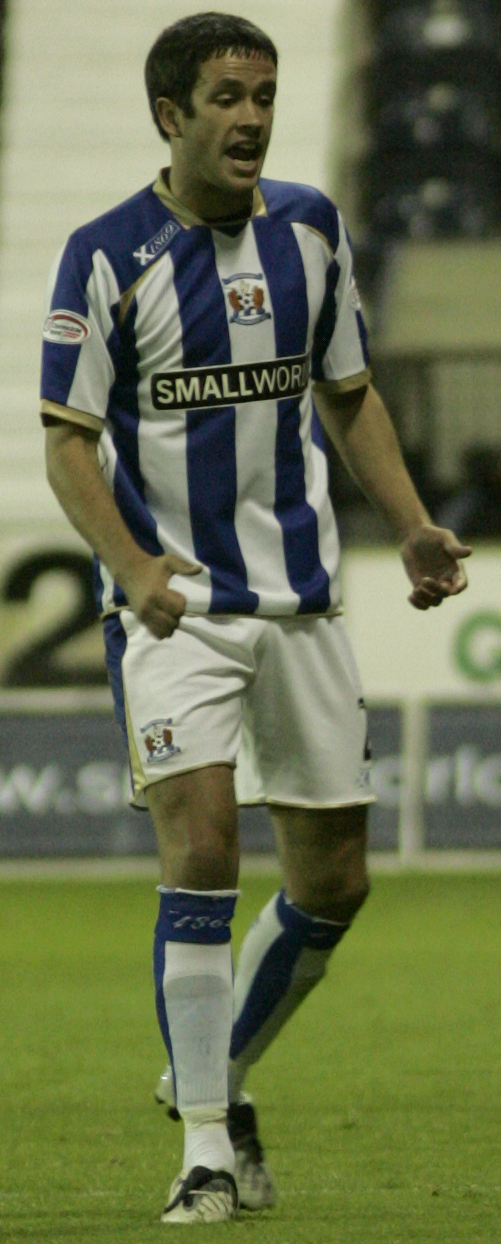
Clancy playing for Kilmarnock

Clancy joined Scottish Premier League club Kilmarnock in early 2007 on amateur forms. He then agreed a one-year professional contract with Kilmarnock in June 2007. Clancy made his debut at left full back away to Gretna in September and made enough appearances during the 2007–08 season to trigger an automatic extension to his contract. His progress at Kilmarnock was hindered by a series of injuries, however, as he missed over four months after suffering an ankle ligament injury in April 2008.

Clancy also missed pre-season training in 2008–09 due to injury. He made a first team comeback in a goalless 0–0 draw at Aberdeen in February 2009. Clancy played regularly for Kilmarnock towards the end of the season and agreed a new two-year contract with the club. He did not play regularly during the 2010–11 season, as manager Mixu Paatelainen used Jamie Hamill as his regular right back. Later in the season, he scored an own goal which gave Rangers a 2–1 victory. Clancy made 73 appearances for Killie in total. Manager Kenny Shiels allowed Clancy to leave the club in order to rebalance his defensive options, with Ryan O'Leary out injured.

=== Motherwell ===
Clancy moved to Motherwell in August 2011 and agreed a one-year deal. Motherwell signed Clancy to cover for the long-term injury suffered by Steven Saunders. He played regularly in central defence for Mothewell, alongside Shaun Hutchinson. He also played both full back positions during the season. At the end of the season, Clancy rejected a new contract from Motherwell.

=== Hibernian ===
Clancy signed a two-year contract with Hibernian in June 2012. Clancy scored the first goal in a 2–2 draw against Celtic on 1 September, when he took advantage of a defensive mix-up. It was the first goal he had scored since playing in English non-league football, over six years previously. Clancy played regularly for Hibs before suffering from a groin injury that required specialist advice. He continued to suffer from injury problems and was released by Hibs in January 2014.

=== St Johnstone ===
On 28 February 2014, Clancy signed for St Johnstone on a contract until the end of the 2013–14 season despite interests from Derry City. Clancy scored his first goal for the club, in a 3–3 draw against Celtic on 7 May 2014, which turns out to be his last appearance for the club. Clancy sustained a serious Achilles injury during training and needed an operation that ruled him out of the final of the Scottish Cup. At the end of the 2013–14 season, Clancy was among four players to be released by St Johnstone.

=== League of Ireland ===
Clancy returned home to sign for Shamrock Rovers in February 2015. In July 2015 Clancy went on loan to Sligo Rovers until November 2015. In January 2016 he signed permanently for Sligo but left the club in June 2016. On 28 June 2016 he went on trial at Bray Wanderers during their 1-0 friendly win against Falkirk. On 30 June 2016 Clancy signed permanently for Bray making his competitive debut against Bohemians. He retired from playing at the end of the 2017 season.

== Managerial career ==
=== Drogheda United ===
On 5 December 2017 Clancy was appointed as Manager of League of Ireland First Division side Drogheda United. This was his first role in management, and he was assisted in the role by newly appointed Director of Football Dave Robertson. During his first two seasons at the club, his young Drogheda side missed out on promotion twice. Ahead of the 2020 season, Clancy added more key members to his squad, and the club lifted the 2020 League of Ireland First Division Title, gaining promotion to the League of Ireland Premier Division. This was his first honour at the club.

In his first season in the Premier Division with Drogheda, Clancy guided the Drogs to seventh place, securing top flight football for another season for the Louth club. Despite having one of the lowest budgets in the league, Clancy led the club to impressive victories against St Patrick's Athletic, Derry City and rivals Dundalk.

=== St Patrick's Athletic ===
On 2 December 2021, it was announced that St Patrick's Athletic had met the release clause in Clancy's Drogheda United contract and had joined the club on a 2-year contract effective immediately. With Kevin Doherty staying at Drogheda to become first team manager, former Dundee United striker Jon Daly was appointed as Clancy's assistant manager. Clancy had to deal with the losses of Robbie Benson, John Mountney and Sam Bone who followed former head coach Stephen O'Donnell to Dundalk, while also losing other key players such as Lee Desmond, Alfie Lewis, Matty Smith and Vítězslav Jaroš. In terms of incomings, Clancy signed Joe Redmond, Mark Doyle and David Odumosu who he had worked with previously at Drogheda United, along with former Hibernian teammate Eoin Doyle and Joseph Anang, Jack Scott, Tom Grivosti, Anthony Breslin, Tunde Owolabi and Adam O'Reilly.

Clancy's first league game as manager of the Saints was a comfortable 3–0 away win over Shelbourne in what was their manager Damien Duff's first game in senior management.

His first taste of managing in European football was in Pat's UEFA Europa Conference League campaign, which started out with a 1–1 draw at home to Slovenian side NŠ Mura. The second leg saw his side advance 6–5 on penalties following a 0–0 draw after extra time. The next round saw Pat's beat Bulgarian side CSKA Sofia 1–0 away before suffering the heartache of a 2–0 loss in the second leg following a controversial late penalty. Clancy's side finished in 4th place at the end of his first season in charge, securing UEFA Europa Conference League football for 2023.

Clancy was awarded his UEFA Pro Licence in December 2022, the highest coaching qualification in world football.

On 2 May 2023, Clancy departed St Patrick's Athletic by mutual consent with the club in 7th place, 13 games into the 2023 season.

=== Cork City ===
On 24 November 2023, Clancy was announced as the new manager of Cork City, who had recently been relegated to the League of Ireland First Division. He led the club straight back to the Premier Division at the first time of asking by winning the 2024 League of Ireland First Division title by a staggering 22 points ahead of second placed UCD.

On 9 May 2025, Clancy resigned as manager of the club following a 2–1 defeat to Derry City, leaving the club second from bottom in the 2025 League of Ireland Premier Division.

== Career statistics ==
=== Playing career ===
Professional appearances in playing career.

Appearances and goals by club, season and competition
Club	Season	League			National Cup		League Cup		Europe		Other		Total	
Club	Season	Division	Apps	Goals	Apps	Goals	Apps	Goals	Apps	Goals	Apps	Goals	Apps	Goals
Millwall	2003–04	EFL Championship	0	0	—		0	0	—		—		0	0
Weymouth (loan)	2003–04	Southern Football League	11	0	0	0	0	0	—		—		11	0
AFC Hornchurch	2004–05	Essex Senior Football League							—					
AFC Hornchurch	2006–07	IL Premier Division							—					
AFC Hornchurch	Total								—					
Fisher Athletic (loan)	2005–06	IL Premier Division							—					
Kilmarnock	2007–08	Scottish Premier League	11	0	0	0	0	0	—		—		11	0
Kilmarnock	2008–09	Scottish Premier League	13	0	0	0	0	0	—		—		13	0
Kilmarnock	2009–10	Scottish Premier League	20	0	2	0	1	0	—		—		23	0
Kilmarnock	2010–11	Scottish Premier League	21	0	1	0	3	0	—		—		25	0
Kilmarnock	2011–12	Scottish Premier League	1	0	—		—		—		—		1	0
Kilmarnock	Total		66	0	3	0	4	0	—		—		73	0
Motherwell	2011–12	Scottish Premier League	26	0	3	0	1	0	—		—		30	0
Hibernian	2012–13	Scottish Premier League	19	1	1	0	1	0	—		—		21	1
Hibernian	2013–14	Scottish Premier League	0	0	0	0	0	0	—		—		0	0
Hibernian	Total		19	1	1	0	1	0	—		—		21	1
St Johnstone	2013–14	Scottish Premier League	4	1	—		—		—		—		4	1
Shamrock Rovers	2015	LOI Premier Division	3	0	0	0	2	0	2 (Note: Appearances in the UEFA Europa League)	0	1 (Note: Appearances in the Leinster Senior Cup)	0	8	0
Sligo Rovers (loan)	2015	LOI Premier Division	8	1	1	0	—		—		—		9	1
Sligo Rovers	2016	LOI Premier Division	7	0	0	0	0	0	—		—		7	0
Sligo Rovers	Total		15	1	1	0	0	0	—		—		16	1
Bray Wanderers	2016	LOI Premier Division	13	0	—		—		—		—		13	0
Bray Wanderers	2017	LOI Premier Division	23	3	1	0	0	0	—		2 (Note: 1 appearance in the Leinster Senior Cup & 1 appearance in the Scottish Challenge Cup)	0	26	3
Bray Wanderers	Total		36	3	1	0	0	0	—		2	0	29	3
Career Total			170	6	9	0	8	0	2	0	3	0	192	6

=== Managerial career ===
As of match played 9 May 2025

Managerial record by team and tenure
Team	From	To	Record							
Team	From	To	G	W	D	L	GF	GA	GD	Win %
Drogheda United	5 December 2017	2 December 2021	128	60	27	41	215	148	+67	46.88
St Patrick's Athletic	2 December 2021	2 May 2023	56	25	10	21	81	67	+14	44.64
Cork City	24 November 2023	9 May 2025	56	26	18	12	85	51	+34	46.43
Total			240	111	55	74	381	266	+115	46.25

== Honours ==
=== As manager ===
Drogheda United

- League of Ireland First Division: 2020

Cork City

- League of Ireland First Division: 2024
