= Adam O'Reilly =

Irish footballer

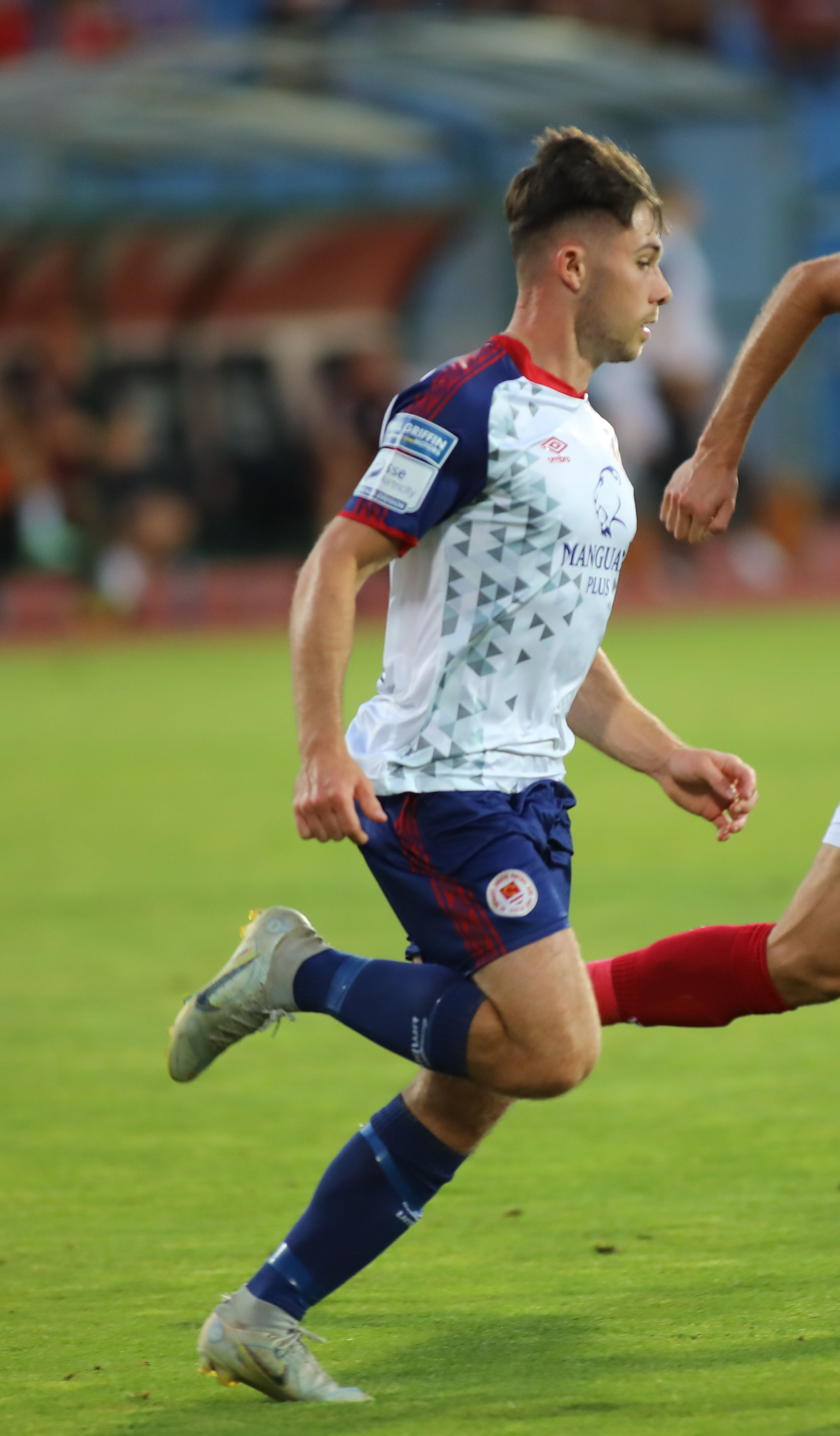
- O'Reilly with St Patrick's Athletic in 2022.

Personal information
- Full name: Adam Kieran O'Reilly
- Date of birth: 11 May 2001 (age 25)
- Place of birth: Cork, Ireland
- Position: Midfielder

Team information
- Current team: Derry City
- Number: 8

Youth career
- 2009–2017: Ringmahon Rangers
- 2016–2018: Preston North End

Senior career*
Years	Team	Apps	(Gls)
2018–2023	Preston North End	1	(0)
2019	→ Hyde United (loan)	4	(1)
2020	→ Stalybridge Celtic (loan)	6	(1)
2020	→ Bamber Bridge (loan)	3	(1)
2021	→ Waterford (loan)	16	(0)
2021	→ Stalybridge Celtic (loan)	4	(0)
2022	→ St Patrick's Athletic (loan)	34	(2)
2023–	Derry City	127	(11)

International career^{‡}
2017–2018	Republic of Ireland U17	6	(1)
2019	Republic of Ireland U19	3	(0)
- * Club domestic league appearances and goals as of 22:45, 12 October 2026 (UTC) ‡ National team caps and goals as of 19:35, 23 August 2020 (UTC)

Adam Kieran O'Reilly (born 11 May 2001) is an Irish professional footballer who plays as a midfielder for Derry City in the League of Ireland Premier Division. He made his professional debut for Preston North End in December 2018, aged 17 before spending time on loan at Hyde United, Stalybridge Celtic (over two spells), Bamber Bridge, Waterford and St Patrick's Athletic.

== Club career ==
=== Early career ===
Raised in Mahon, Cork, O'Reilly progressed through the academy of local side Ringmahon Rangers, where he played under his father, Kieran. During his time with the club he produced an act of sportsmanship that went viral, passing a penalty straight to the opposing goalkeeper after it was deemed that it was unfairly awarded to his side.

=== Preston North End ===
O'Reilly signed for Preston North End in December 2016 after successfully trialing with the club. During his first full season with the club's academy, he helped his side reach the Lancashire FA Youth Cup final, was named in the team of the season and won Preston's Scholar of the Year award. The highlight of the season came in February 2018 when he was named on the substitute's bench for the first team's Championship match against Wolverhampton Wanderers, although he was not called to enter the field of play.

On 29 December 2018, following a string of injuries in the first-team squad, O'Reilly was afforded the chance to feature on the bench again in a league encounter against Aston Villa. He made his debut in the final minutes of the match, coming on as a substitute for compatriot Graham Burke as the two sides played out to a 1–1 draw. In doing so, he became the 20th-youngest player ever to represent the club. The following month, he signed his first professional contract with Preston. On 27 October 2020, he signed a new contract with the club until the summer of 2023.

==== Loan to Hyde United ====
At the start of March 2019, O'Reilly signed for Hyde United on a short-term loan deal and made his debut for the club in a 2–1 defeat to Farsley Celtic. The first goal of O'Reilly's senior career came on 30 March 2019, scoring in a 5–3 win over Stafford Rangers. He made 4 appearances for the club, scoring 1 goal.

==== Loan to Stalybridge Celtic ====
In January 2020 O'Reilly joined Stalybridge Celtic on loan until the end of the season along with fellow Preston teammate Ethan Walker. His first goal for the club came on 4 February 2020 in a 2–1 loss against Gainsborough Trinity. He returned to Preston following 7 appearances in all competitions and 1 goal.

==== Loan to Bamber Bridge ====
In October 2020 O'Reilly joined Bamber Bridge on a short-term loan deal until the end of November, alongside Ex-Preston teammate Mathew Hudson. He scored on his debut the following day in a 2–1 loss to Buxton.

==== Loan to Waterford ====
On 22 February 2021, O'Reilly returned to Ireland, signing for League of Ireland Premier Division side Waterford on loan until 30 June 2021 ahead of their 2021 season. He made his debut for the club in the opening game of the season on 19 March 2021 as his side lost 1–0 away to newly promoted side Drogheda United. He left the club at the end of June after 16 appearances for the club.

==== Second Stalybridge Celtic loan ====
On 19 November 2021, O'Reilly returned to Stalybridge Celtic on loan until the end of December. He made 4 league appearances for the club before returning to Preston North End.

==== St Patrick's Athletic loan ====
On 20 January 2022, O'Reilly signed for League of Ireland Premier Division runners up and FAI Cup holders St Patrick's Athletic on loan until 31 July, ahead of their 2022 season. On 11 February 2022, he made his debut for the club in the 2022 President of Ireland's Cup against Shamrock Rovers at Tallaght Stadium, scoring his penalty in the shootout as his side lost 5–4 on penalties after a 1–1 draw. O'Reilly was voted Player of the Month by the club's fans for June following a run of excellent performances. On 19 July 2022, he signed a loan extension until the end of the season in November. O'Reilly made his first appearance in European football on 21 July 2022 in a 1–1 draw with Slovenian side NŠ Mura in the UEFA Europa Conference League. He was named as the club's Player of the Month award for July 2022, his second month running to win the award. O'Reilly scored his first goal for the club in a 3–1 win away to Bohemians at Dalymount Park on 29 August 2022. On 7 October 2022, he scored a 93rd-minute winner away to Dundalk to secure a crucial 2–1 win for his side in the race for Europe. He received the Young Player of the Year award at the club awards night after being voted by supporters.

=== Derry City ===
On 30 January 2023, O'Reilly departed Preston North End after six and a half years at the club, signing for League of Ireland Premier Division side Derry City on a two-year-contract for an undisclosed fee. He made his debut on 10 February 2023 in a 2–0 win over Shamrock Rovers in the 2023 President of Ireland's Cup. Having scored 2 goals in 76 appearances in all competitions in his first two years at the club, he signed a new two-year contract with the club on 8 December 2024. On 8 November 2026, he was part of the starting XI in a 1–0 win over Waterford in the 2026 FAI Cup final at the Aviva Stadium.

== International career ==
O'Reilly has represented Republic of Ireland at various youth levels and was part of the squad which reached the quarter-finals of the 2018 UEFA European Under-17 Championship. On 19 September 2022, he was called up to the Republic of Ireland U21 squad for the first time for their 2023 UEFA European Under-21 Championship Qualification Play-off games against Israel U21.

== Career statistics ==
As of match played 8 November 2026

Appearances and goals by club, season and competition
Club	Season	League			National cup		League cup		Europe		Other		Total	
Club	Season	Division	Apps	Goals	Apps	Goals	Apps	Goals	Apps	Goals	Apps	Goals	Apps	Goals
Preston North End	2018–19	EFL Championship	1	0	0	0	0	0	—		—		1	0
Preston North End	2019–20	EFL Championship	0	0	0	0	0	0	—		—		0	0
Preston North End	2020–21	EFL Championship	0	0	0	0	0	0	—		—		0	0
Preston North End	2021–22	EFL Championship	0	0	0	0	0	0	—		—		0	0
Preston North End	2022–23	EFL Championship	0	0	0	0	0	0	—		—		0	0
Preston North End	Total		1	0	0	0	0	0	—		—		1	0
Hyde United (loan)	2018–19	Northern Premier League	4	1	—		—		—		—		4	1
Stalybridge Celtic (loan)	2019–20	Northern Premier League	6	1	—		—		—		1 (Note: Appearances in the Northern Premier League Challenge Cup)	0	7	1
Bamber Bridge (loan)	2020–21	Northern Premier League	3	1	—		—		—		—		3	1
Waterford (loan)	2021	LOI Premier Division	16	0	—		—		—		—		16	0
Stalybridge Celtic (loan)	2021–22	Northern Premier League	4	0	—		—		—		1 (Note: Appearances in the FA Trophy)	0	5	0
St Patrick's Athletic (loan)	2022	LOI Premier Division	34	2	1	0	—		4 (Note: Appearances in the UEFA Europa Conference League)	0	1 (Note: Appearance in the President of Ireland's Cup)	0	40	2
Derry City	2023	LOI Premier Division	28	1	1	0	—		4	0	1	0	34	1
Derry City	2024	LOI Premier Division	35	1	5	0	—		2 (Note: Appearances in the UEFA Conference League)	0	—		42	1
Derry City	2025	LOI Premier Division	33	4	2	0	—		—		—		35	4
Derry City	2026	LOI Premier Division	31	5	5	1	—		3 (Note: 1 appearance in the UEFA Europa League; 2 appearances in the UEFA Conference League)	0	1	0	40	6
Derry City	Total		127	11	13	1	—		9	0	2	0	151	12
Career total			195	16	14	1	0	0	13	0	5	0	227	17

== Honours ==
Derry City

- FAI Cup: 2026
- President of Ireland's Cup (2): 2023, 2026

Individual

- St Patrick's Athletic Young Player of the Year: 2022
