= Élie N'Zeyi =

French footballer (born 1997)

Personal information
- Full name: Élie Gaël N'Zeyi Kibonge
- Date of birth: 17 October 1997 (age 29)
- Place of birth: Amiens, France
- Height: 1.85 m (6 ft 1 in)
- Position: Midfielder

Team information
- Current team: Budoni

Youth career
- Amiens

Senior career*
Years	Team	Apps	(Gls)
2015–2017	Amiens B	37	(2)
2018–2019	Bastia-Borgo	14	(0)
2019–2020	Évreux 27	3	(0)
2021	Pohronie	10	(0)
2022	Finn Harps	23	(0)
2023–	Budoni	6	(0)
- * Club domestic league appearances and goals as of 20 December 2023

Élie N'Zeyi (born 17 October 1997) is a French professional footballer who plays as a midfielder for Italian Serie D club Budoni.

== Club career ==
=== FK Pohronie ===
N'Zeyi was featured for Pohronie in winter friendly games and went on to be signed by the Slovak Fortuna Liga club.

N'Zeyi was nominated in late February for a league fixture against AS Trenčín but remained unused. N'Zeyi made his Fortuna Liga debut during an away fixture on 6 March 2021 against Senica. He came on in the 89th minute to replace Martin Adamec and seal the defence. Pohronie was in a narrow 1–0 lead, thanks to a first-half goal by Patrik Blahút. Senica's late pressure was, however, converted into a last-minute equaliser set by a header from Marin Ljubičić. The match ended in said tie.

=== Finn Harps ===
On 11 February 2022, N'Zeyi signed for Finn Harps in the League of Ireland Premier Division.

N'Zeyi made his debut for the club on 25 February 2022 in a 0–0 draw away to UCD at the UCD Bowl.
