= Tunde Owolabi =

Belgian footballer (born 1995)

Personal information
- Date of birth: 26 July 1995 (age 31)
- Place of birth: Antwerp, Belgium
- Position: Striker

Team information
- Current team: Flint Town United
- Number: 9

Youth career
- 2011–2012: Royal Cappellen
- 2013–2014: FC United of Manchester

Senior career*
Years	Team	Apps	(Gls)
2015–2017	New Mills		
2017	Hyde United		
2017	Prescot Cables		
2017	Stalybridge Celtic		
2017	Glossop North End		
2017–2018	Prescot Cables		
2018	Skelmersdale United	10	(0)
2018–2019	Radcliffe	36	(22)
2019	Victoria Hotspurs		
2019–2020	FC United of Manchester	28	(28)
2020–2021	Hamilton Academical	7	(0)
2021	Finn Harps	31	(10)
2022	St Patrick's Athletic	28	(5)
2023	Cork City	28	(4)
2024	Macclesfield	14	(9)
2024	Southport	7	(0)
2024–2025	Radcliffe	22	(3)
2025–2026	Warrington Rylands		
2025	→ Stalybridge Celtic (loan)	8	(1)
2025	→ Leek Town (loan)		
2026	Hyde United		
2026–	Flint Town United	15	(6)
- * Club domestic league appearances and goals as of 16:04, 4 November 2026 (UTC)

Tunde Owolabi (born 26 July 1995) is a Belgian professional footballer who plays as a striker for Cymru Premier club Flint Town United.

== Early and personal life ==
Owolabi's Nigerian father Ganiyu was also a professional footballer. He was born and raised in Antwerp, where his father was playing at the time for Royal Antwerp. Owolabi played for Belgian club Royal Cappellen's under 17 side before the family moved to England in 2012, when he was 18 years old.

== Career ==
Owolabi played for the FC United of Manchester development team during the 2013–14 season. He played for New Mills, moving from them to Hyde United in February 2017. By December 2017 he had played for Prescot Cables (twice), Stalybridge Celtic and Glossop North End. After moving to Skelmersdale United in February 2018, without scoring in 10 games, he then played for Radcliffe, scoring 26 goals in the 2018–19 season, which earned him the Supporters Player Award from the Northern Premier League Player Awards. He left Radcliffe in the summer of 2019 to move to Malta, to join Victoria Hotspurs before returning to England later that summer, signing with FC United of Manchester in August 2019. He signed a new contract with the club in November 2019. He scored 35 goals in 41 games in all competitions for the club during the 2019–20 season.

He signed a one-year contract with Scottish club Hamilton Academical in July 2020, having previously been linked with a transfer to Grimsby Town. He made his professional debut for Hamilton on 8 August 2020 in a Scottish Premier League match against Ross County. On 1 February 2021, Owolabi was released by Hamilton alongside teammate Justin Johnson, via mutual consent.

On 7 March 2021, Owolabi signed a one-year deal with Irish club Finn Harps. He scored a hat-trick in a 3–1 win over second placed St Patrick's Athletic on 20 August 2021, taking him up to 5 goals for the season. Owolabi scored a total of 12 goals in 34 appearances in all competitions during his time with Finn Harps.

On 24 December 2021, Owolabi signed for League of Ireland Premier Division runners up, Dublin club St Patrick's Athletic, who had also just won the 2021 FAI Cup. On 11 February 2022, Owolabi made his debut for the club in the 2022 President of Ireland's Cup against Shamrock Rovers at Tallaght Stadium, scoring in the penalty shootout as his side lost 5–4 on penalties after a 1–1 draw. His first goal for Pat's came on 25 February 2022 when he came off the bench and pulled a goal back for his side 10 minutes later in a 2–1 defeat against Sligo Rovers at Richmond Park. On 23 May 2022, Owolabi scored a hat-trick in a 3–0 win over rivals Bohemians at Richmond Park. Owolabi made his first appearance in European football on 21 July 2022 in a 1–1 draw with Slovenian side NŠ Mura in the UEFA Europa Conference League.

On 10 December 2022, Owolabi signed for Cork City for the 2023 season.

On 28 December 2023, it was announced that Owolabi had agreed terms with Northern Premier League Premier Division side Macclesfield.

On 22 June 2024, Owolabi joined National League North side Southport. In September 2024, he returned to Radcliffe on a one-year deal. In May 2025, he joined Northern Premier League Premier Division side Warrington Rylands. In October he returned to one of his former clubs, Stalybridge Celtic, on an initial one-month loan. He scored in his first match for the club.

He then went on an additional loan spell at Leek Town in November 2025 before in February 2026 signing for Hyde United.

In July 2026 he signed for Flint Town United.

== Career statistics ==
As of end of 2024–25 season

Appearances and goals by club, season and competition
Club	Season	League			National Cup		League Cup		Other		Total	
Club	Season	Division	Apps	Goals	Apps	Goals	Apps	Goals	Apps	Goals	Apps	Goals
Skelmersdale United	2017–18	NPL Division One North	10	0	—		—		—		10	0
Radcliffe	2018–19	NPL Division One West	36	22	3	0	1	0	6 (Note: 1 appearance in the FA Trophy; 3 appearances and 1 goal in the Manchester Premier Cup; 2 appearances and 2 goals in the Lancashire FA Challenge Trophy)	3	46	25
FC United of Manchester	2019–20	NPL Premier Division	28	28	3	0	2	0	8 (Note: 5 appearances and 6 goals in the FA Trophy; 3 appearances and 1 goal in the Manchester Premier Cup)	7	41	35
Hamilton Academical	2020–21	Scottish Premiership	7	0	0	0	2	0	—		9	0
Finn Harps	2021	LOI Premier Division	31	10	3	2	—		—		34	12
St Patrick's Athletic	2022	LOI Premier Division	28	5	1	0	—		3 (Note: 1 appearance in the President of Ireland's Cup & 2 appearances in the UEFA Europa Conference League)	0	32	5
Cork City	2023	LOI Premier Division	28	4	2	1	—		2 (Note: Appearance(s) in the Munster Senior Cup)	2	32	7
Macclesfield	2023–24	NPL Premier Division	16	9	—		—		5 (Note: Three appearances and two goals in FA Trophy, two appearances and one goal in NPL Premier Division play-offs)	3	21	12
Southport	2024–25	National League North	7	0	1	0	—		0	0	8	0
Radcliffe	2024–25	National League North	22	3	0	0	—		3 (Note: Appearance(s) in FA Trophy)	0	25	3
Career total			213	81	13	3	5	0	27	15	267	99
