= 2014 St Patrick's Athletic F.C. season =

St Patrick's Athletic F.C.
2014 season
- Chairman: Garrett Kelleher
- Coach: Liam Buckley
- Stadium: Richmond Park, Inchicore
- Premier Division: 3rd
- FAI Cup: Winners
- League of Ireland Cup: Second round
- Setanta Cup: Semi-final
- Leinster Senior Cup: Winners
- President's Cup: Winners
- UEFA Champions League: Second qualifying round
- Top goalscorer: League: Christy Fagan – 20 goals All: Christy Fagan – 27 goals
- Highest home attendance: 6,000 vs Legia Warsaw (Champions League, 23 July)
- Lowest home attendance: 500 (Est.) vs Shamrock Rovers (Leinster Senior Cup, 20 May)
Home colours	Away colours

The 2014 season was St. Patrick's Athletic F.C.'s 85th year in existence and was their 63rd consecutive season in the League of Ireland top division. It was the third year that Liam Buckley is the team's manager (in his current spell), following replacing Pete Mahon in December 2011. The Saints finished the previous season as the 2013 champions. The season was very successful on the field as the Saints began by winning the inaugural President's Cup and the Leinster Senior Cup. The biggest triumph of all however was when top scorer Christy Fagan wrote himself into the club's history books by scoring twice in a 2–0 win over Derry City in the 2014 FAI Cup Final, ending a 53-year hoodoo with the cup for the club. Pats also competed in the UEFA Champions League, the Setanta Cup and the League of Ireland Cup.

== Squad ==
No.	Name	Nationality	Position (s)	Date of birth (age)	Previous club	Signed in	Club Apps.	Club Goals
Goalkeepers
1	Brendan Clarke	(Republic of Ireland)	GK	17 September 1985 (age 41)	(Republic of Ireland) Sligo Rovers	2012	146	0
16	Rene Gilmartin (Sold 25 August)	(Republic of Ireland)	GK	31 May 1987 (age 39)	(England) Plymouth Argyle	2013	10	0
25	Pat Jennings	(England)	GK	24 September 1979 (age 47)	(Republic of Ireland) Athlone Town	2013	2	0
Defenders
2	Ger O'Brien (Captain)	(Republic of Ireland)	RB / CB	2 June 1984 (age 42)	(Republic of Ireland) Bohemians	2012	120	2
3	Ian Bermingham (Vice-captain)	(Republic of Ireland)	LB	6 June 1989 (age 37)	(Republic of Ireland) Shamrock Rovers	2010	197	4
4	Derek Foran	(Republic of Ireland)	CB	9 September 1989 (age 37)	(Republic of Ireland) Shamrock Rovers	2014	18	0
5	Ken Oman	(Republic of Ireland)	CB	29 July 1982 (age 44)	(Republic of Ireland) Shamrock Rovers	2014	21	0
12	Lorcan Fitzgerald	(Republic of Ireland)	LB / CM	3 January 1989 (age 37)	(Republic of Ireland) Shelbourne	2013	18	0
15	Kenny Browne	(Republic of Ireland)	CB	7 August 1986 (age 40)	(Republic of Ireland) Waterford United	2012	116	4
20	Sean Hoare	(Republic of Ireland)	CB / RB	15 March 1994 (age 32)	(Republic of Ireland) St Patrick's Athletic Under 19's	2012	38	3
22	Conor McCormack	(Republic of Ireland)	RB / CDM / CM	18 June 1990 (age 36)	(Republic of Ireland) Shamrock Rovers	2014	38	0
27	Daniel Campbell	(Republic of Ireland)	CB	12 January 1995 (age 31)	(Republic of Ireland) St Patrick's Athletic Under 19's	2013	2	0
Midfielders
6	Greg Bolger	(Republic of Ireland)	CDM / CM	9 September 1988 (age 38)	(Republic of Ireland) Dundalk	2012	112	6
7	Conan Byrne	(Republic of Ireland)	RW	10 August 1985 (age 41)	(Republic of Ireland) Shelbourne	2013	92	38
8	Keith Fahey	(Republic of Ireland)	CM / CDM / CAM	15 January 1983 (age 43)	(England) Birmingham City	2014	229	36
11	Killian Brennan	(Republic of Ireland)	CAM / CM / CB	31 January 1984 (age 42)	(Republic of Ireland) Shamrock Rovers	2013	74	15
14	James Chambers	(Republic of Ireland)	CDM / CM	14 February 1987 (age 39)	(Republic of Ireland) Shamrock Rovers	2014	76	2
17	Chris Forrester	(Republic of Ireland)	LW / RW / CAM	17 December 1992 (age 33)	(Republic of Ireland) Bohemians	2012	125	30
18	Lee Lynch (sold 31 July)	(Republic of Ireland)	CAM / CM / RW	27 November 1991 (age 34)	(Republic of Ireland) Sligo Rovers	2014	28	4
19	Marco Chindea	(Romania)	RW / LW	18 April 1994 (age 32)	(Republic of Ireland) St Patrick's Athletic Under 19's	2012	4	0
21	Daryl Kavanagh (sold 31 July)	(Republic of Ireland)	RW / LW / ST	11 August 1986 (age 40)	(Republic of Ireland) Cork City	2013	80	18
21	Aaron Greene (signed 31 July)	(Republic of Ireland)	LW / ST / LB	2 January 1990 (age 36)	(Republic of Ireland) Sligo Rovers	2014	10	2
24	Sam Verdon	(Republic of Ireland)	CM / ST	3 September 1995 (age 31)	(Republic of Ireland) St Patrick's Athletic Under 19's	2013	7	2
26	Jack Bayly	(Republic of Ireland)	CAM / CM	18 June 1996 (age 30)	(Republic of Ireland) St Patrick's Athletic Under 19's	2013	3	1
-	Jamie McGrath	(Republic of Ireland)	RW / LW	30 September 1996 (age 30)	(Republic of Ireland) St Patrick's Athletic Under 19's	2014	2	0
-	Rory Feely	(Republic of Ireland)	RW	3 January 1997 (age 29)	(Republic of Ireland) St Patrick's Athletic Under 19's	2014	2	0
Forwards
9	Christy Fagan	(Republic of Ireland)	CF / ST	11 May 1989 (age 37)	(Republic of Ireland) Bohemians	2012	119	56
10	Mark Quigley	(Republic of Ireland)	ST / CAM	26 October 1985 (age 41)	(Republic of Ireland) Shamrock Rovers	2014	185	55
23	Peter Durrad	(Republic of Ireland)	ST	16 December 1994 (age 31)	(Republic of Ireland) St Patrick's Athletic Under 19's	2013	9	1

=== Transfers ===
==== In ====
Player	Country	Position	Signed From
Ken Oman	(Republic of Ireland)	Defender	(Republic of Ireland) Shamrock Rovers
Conor McCormack	(Republic of Ireland)	Midfielder	(Republic of Ireland) Shamrock Rovers
Lee Lynch	(Republic of Ireland)	Midfielder	(Republic of Ireland) Sligo Rovers
James Chambers	(Republic of Ireland)	Midfiekder	(Republic of Ireland) Shamrock Rovers
Mark Quigley	(Republic of Ireland)	Forward	(Republic of Ireland) Shamrock Rovers
Keith Fahey	(Republic of Ireland)	Midfielder	(England) Birmingham City
Derek Foran	(Republic of Ireland)	Defender	(Republic of Ireland) Shamrock Rovers

==== Out ====
Player	Country	Position	Sold To
Anthony Flood	(Republic of Ireland)	Forward	(Australia) Dunbar Rovers
Sean Gannon	(Republic of Ireland)	Defender	(Republic of Ireland) Dundalk
Conor Kenna	(Republic of Ireland)	Defender	(Republic of Ireland) Shamrock Rovers
Shane McFaul	(Republic of Ireland)	Midfielder	(Finland) FC KTP
Aidan Price	(Republic of Ireland)	Defender	(Republic of Ireland) Bohemians
John Russell	(Republic of Ireland)	Midfielder	(Republic of Ireland) Sligo Rovers
Jake Kelly	(Republic of Ireland)	Midfielder	(Republic of Ireland) Bray Wanderers
Stephen Maher	(Republic of Ireland)	Midfielder	(Republic of Ireland) Drogheda United

==== In ====
Player	Country	Position	Signed From
Aaron Greene	(Republic of Ireland)	Midfielder	(Republic of Ireland) Sligo Rovers

==== Out ====
Player	Country	Position	Sold To
Lee Lynch	(Republic of Ireland)	Midfielder	(Republic of Ireland) Limerick
Daryl Kavanagh	(Republic of Ireland)	Midfielder	(Republic of Ireland) Sligo Rovers
Rene Gilmartin	(Republic of Ireland)	Goalkeeper	(England) Watford

=== Squad statistics ===
==== Appearances, goals and cards ====
Number in brackets represents (appearances of which were substituted ON). Last Updated – 3 November 2014

No.	Player	Airtricity League		FAI Cup		EA Sports Cup		Champions League		Setanta Cup		Leinster Senior Cup		President's Cup		Total	
No.	Player	Apps	Goals	Apps	Goals	Apps	Goals	Apps	Goals	Apps	Goals	Apps	Goals	Apps	Goals	Apps	Goals
1	B.Clarke	33	0	5	0	0	0	2	0	2(1)	0	1	0	1	0	44(1)	0
2	G.O'Brien	24(2)	0	5(1)	0	0	0	2	0	2	0	1	0	1	0	34(3)	0
3	I.Bermingham	30	2	5	0	0	0	2	0	3	0	1	0	1	0	42	2
4	D.Foran	11(2)	0	1	0	0	0	1	0	3	0	2	0	0	0	18(2)	0
5	K.Oman	9(2)	0	3(2)	0	0	0	1	0	4(1)	0	3	0	1	0	21(5)	0
6	G.Bolger	24(5)	0	4(1)	0	1	0	2	0	2(1)	0	3	1	1	0	37(7)	1
7	C.Byrne	33	18	6	4	1	0	2	0	3	2	2	1	1	0	48	25
8	K.Fahey	26(2)	2	6	1	0	0	2	0	2	0	1	1	1	1	38(2)	5
9	C.Fagan	32(1)	20	5	6	0	0	2	1	1	0	1(1)	0	1	0	42(2)	27
10	M.Quigley	19(11)	1	3(1)	0	0	0	2(2)	0	3	2	3	0	1(1)	0	31(15)	3
11	K.Brennan	24(7)	1	6	3	1	1	2	0	2	0	2	0	1	0	38(7)	5
12	L.Fitzgerald	6(4)	0	2(1)	0	1	0	0	0	2	0	3	0	0	0	14(5)	0
14	J.Chambers	25(6)	1	4(2	0	0	0	1(1)	0	3(1)	0	4(3)	0	0	0	37(13)	1
15	K.Browne	27	1	4	0	1	0	2	0	1	0	1	0	1	0	37	1
16	R.Gilmartin	1(1)	0	1	0	1	0	0	0	3	0	1	0	0	0	7(1)	0
17	C.Forrester	30(1)	11	5(1)	0	1(1)	0	2	0	4(2)	1	2(1)	0	1	0	45(6)	12
18	L.Lynch	17(7)	3	0	0	1(1)	0	2(2)	0	4	1	3(2)	0	1(1)	0	28(13)	4
19	M.Chindea	0	0	0	0	0	0	0	0	2(2)	0	0	0	0	0	2(2)	0
20	S.Hoare	22(2)	2	6	1	1(1)	0	1(1)	0	2(1)	0	2(1)	0	0	0	34(7)	3
21	D.Kavanagh	13(12)	0	1	1	1	1	0	0	4(1)	1	3	2	1(1)	0	23(14)	5
21	A.Greene	9(4)	2	0	0	0	0	0	0	0	0	1	0	0	0	10(4)	2
22	C.McCormack	25(8)	0	5(2)	0	1	0	0	0	3(1)	0	4(1)	0	0	0	38(12)	0
23	P.Durrad	2(2)	0	1(1)	0	1	0	0	0	0	0	2	0	0	0	6(3)	0
24	S.Verdon	1(1)	0	1(1)	0	1	0	0	0	1(1)	0	3	2	0	0	7(3)	2
25	P.Jennings	0	0	0	0	0	0	0	0	0	0	2	0	0	0	2	0
26	J.Bayly	1(1)	0	0	0	0	0	0	0	0	0	1(1)	1	0	0	2(2)	1
27	D.Campbell	0	0	0	0	1	0	0	0	0	0	1	0	0	0	2	0
-	J.McGrath	1	0	0	0	0	0	0	0	0	0	1	0	0	0	2	0
-	R.Feely	1(1)	0	0	0	0	0	0	0	0	0	1(1)	0	0	0	2(2)	0

==== Top scorers ====
Includes all competitive matches. Last updated 3 November 2014

Number	Name	Airtricity League	FAI Cup	EA Sports Cup	Champions League	Setanta Cup	Leinster Senior Cup	President's Cup	Total
9	Christy Fagan	20	6	0	1	0	0	0	27
7	Conan Byrne	18	4	0	0	2	1	0	25
17	Chris Forrester	11	0	0	0	1	0	0	12
11	Killian Brennan	1	3	1	0	0	0	0	5
8	Keith Fahey	2	1	0	0	0	1	1	5
21	Daryl Kavanagh	0	1	1	0	1	2	0	5
18	Lee Lynch	3	0	0	0	1	0	0	4
20	Sean Hoare	2	1	0	0	0	0	0	3
21	Aaron Greene	2	0	0	0	0	0	0	2
10	Mark Quigley	1	0	0	0	2	0	0	3
24	Sam Verdon	0	0	0	0	0	2	0	2
3	Ian Bermingham	2	0	0	0	0	0	0	2
26	Jack Bayly	0	0	0	0	0	1	0	1
15	Kenny Browne	1	0	0	0	0	0	0	1
6	Greg Bolger	0	0	0	0	0	1	0	1
14	James Chambers	1	0	0	0	0	0	0	1
-	Own goal	2	0	0	0	0	0	0	2

==== Top assists ====
Includes all competitive matches. Last updated 3 November 2014

Number	Name	Airtricity League	FAI Cup	EA Sports Cup	Champions League	Setanta Cup	Leinster Senior Cup	President's Cup	Total
17	Chris Forrester	14	3	0	0	1	1	0	19
3	Ian Bermingham	9	1	0	1	2	1	0	14
7	Conan Byrne	11	1	1	0	0	0	0	13
8	Keith Fahey	5	2	0	0	1	0	0	8
9	Christy Fagan	6	2	0	0	0	0	0	8
11	Killian Brennan	5	3	0	0	0	0	0	8
10	Mark Quigley	1	0	0	0	1	5	0	7
14	James Chambers	3	0	0	0	0	0	0	3
21	Aaron Greene	2	0	0	0	0	0	0	2
1	Brendan Clarke	2	0	0	0	0	0	0	2
6	Greg Bolger	1	1	0	0	0	0	0	2
22	Conor McCormack	1	1	0	0	0	0	0	2
21	Daryl Kavanagh	1	0	1	0	0	0	0	2
18	Lee Lynch	1	0	0	0	1	0	0	2
2	Ger O'Brien	0	1	0	0	0	0	0	1
-	Jamie McGrath	0	0	0	0	0	1	0	1
20	Sean Hoare	1	0	0	0	0	0	0	1
19	Marco Chindea	0	0	0	0	1	0	0	1
15	Kenny Browne	0	0	0	0	0	0	1	1

==== Top Clean Sheets ====
Includes all competitive matches. Last updated 3 November 2014

Position	Number	Name	Airtricity League	FAI Cup	EA Sports Cup	Champions League	Setanta Cup	Leinster Senior Cup	President's Cup	Total
GK	1	Brendan Clarke	10/33	2/5	0/0	0/2	0/2	0/1	1/1	13/44
GK	16	Rene Gilmartin	1/1	1/1	0/1	0/0	2/3	1/1	0/0	5/7
GK	25	Pat Jennings	0/0	0/0	0/0	0/0	0/0	0/2	0/0	0/2

==== Disciplinary record ====
Number	Position	Name	Airtricity League		FAI Cup		EA Sports Cup		Champions League		Setanta Cup		Leinster Senior Cup		President's Cup		Total	
Number	Position	Name	Yellow card	Red card	Yellow card	Red card	Yellow card	Red card	Yellow card	Red card	Yellow card	Red card	Yellow card	Red card	Yellow card	Red card	Yellow card	Red card
6	MF	Greg Bolger	5	2	3	1	0	0	1	0	0	0	0	0	0	0	9	3
15	DF	Kenny Browne	9	0	1	0	0	0	0	0	1	0	0	0	0	0	11	0
5	DF	Ken Oman	3	2	0	0	0	0	1	0	0	0	2	0	1	0	7	2
20	DF	Sean Hoare	7	0	1	0	0	0	0	0	0	0	0	0	0	0	8	0
17	MF	Chris Forrester	6	0	1	0	0	0	0	0	1	0	0	0	0	0	8	0
14	MF	James Chambers	3	0	0	0	0	0	0	0	2	1	1	0	0	0	6	1
11	MF	Killian Brennan	4	1	1	0	0	0	0	0	0	0	0	0	1	0	6	1
3	DF	Ian Bermingham	5	0	2	0	0	0	0	0	0	0	0	0	0	0	7	0
8	MF	Keith Fahey	2	1	1	0	0	0	0	0	1	0	1	0	0	0	5	1
10	FW	Mark Quigley	3	1	1	0	0	0	0	0	0	0	0	0	0	0	4	1
4	DF	Derek Foran	4	0	0	0	0	0	0	0	1	0	0	0	0	0	5	0
22	DF	Conor McCormack	3	0	1	0	0	0	0	0	0	0	0	0	0	0	4	0
2	DF	Ger O'Brien	2	0	1	0	0	0	0	0	1	0	0	0	0	0	4	0
7	MF	Conan Byrne	3	0	0	0	0	0	0	0	0	0	0	0	0	0	3	0
21	MF	Daryl Kavanagh	0	0	0	0	0	0	0	0	2	0	1	0	0	0	3	0
9	FW	Christy Fagan	2	0	0	0	0	0	0	0	0	0	0	0	0	0	2	0
-	MF	Rory Feely	0	0	0	0	0	0	0	0	0	0	1	0	0	0	1	0
21	MF	Aaron Greene	1	0	0	0	0	0	0	0	0	0	0	0	0	0	1	0
1	GK	Brendan Clarke	0	0	0	0	0	0	1	0	0	0	0	0	0	0	1	0
		TOTALS	62	7	13	1	0	0	3	0	9	1	6	0	2	0	94	9

==== Captains ====
No.	P	Name	Country	No. games	Notes
2	DF	Ger O'Brien	(Republic of Ireland)	32	Captain
3	DF	Ian Bermingham	(Republic of Ireland)	13	Vice-captain
6	MF	Greg Bolger	(Republic of Ireland)	3	
11	MF	Killian Brennan	(Republic of Ireland)	2	
14	MF	James Chambers	(Republic of Ireland)	1	

Last updated: 1 November 2014
Source: Competitive match reports.
Competitive matches only
Matches started as captain only
Country: FIFA nationality; No.: Squad number; P: Position; Name: Player name; No. Games: Number of games started as captain.

==== Most frequent starting line-up ====

Most frequent starting line-up uses the team's most used formation: 4–3–3.
The players used are those who have played the most games in each respective position, not necessarily who have played most games out of all the players.

== Club ==
=== Technical Staff ===
- Manager: Liam Buckley
- Assistant manager: Alan Reynolds
- Coach: Jason Donohue
- Goalkeeping coach: Pat Jennings Jr.
- Head Of Player Recruitment / Coach: Dave Campbell
- Strength and Conditioning Coach: Ger McDermott
- Coaches Assistant / Video Analyst: Graham Buckley
- Chartered Physiotherapist: Mick Spillane
- Physiotherapist: Fearghal Kerin
- Physiotherapist: Christy O'Neill
- Club Doctor: Dr Matt Corcoran
- Kit Man: Derek Haines
- Equipment Manager: Gerry Molloy

=== Kit ===
Supplier: Umbro
Sponsor(s): Clune Construction Company L.P. (Front of Jersey), Sandtex Exterior Paints (Back of jersey), Iceland (Sleeve of jersey)

Home	Home Alt	Away	Away Alt

The club's Away kit was retained from the 2013 season, with new Home kit released for the season.

Type	Shirt	Shorts	Socks	Info
Home	Red/White Sleeves	White	Red	Worn 37 times; against Dundalk (H) (LSC), Ballinamallard United (A) (SSC), Sligo Rovers (H) (PRC), Cork City (A) (LOI), Ballinamallard United (H) (SSC), UCD (H) (LOI), Limerick (H) (LOI), Dundalk (H) (LOI), Shamrock Rovers (H) (LOI), Sligo Rovers (H) (SSC), Bohemians (H) (LOI), Drogheda United (A) (LOI), Athlone Town (H) (LOI), Bohemians (A) (EAC), Cork City (H) (LOI), UCD (A) (LOI), Shamrock Rovers (H) (LSC), Limerick (A) (LOI), Derry City (H) (LOI), Drogheda United (H) (LOI), St. Patrick's CY (A) (FAI), Bray Wanderers (H) (LOI), Shamrock Rovers (A) (LOI), Bohemians (A) (LOI), Legia Warsaw (H) (CHL), Athlone Town (A) (LOI), Sligo Rovers (H) (LOI), Cork City (A) (LOI), UCD (H) (LOI), Limerick (H) (LOI), Shelbourne (H) (FAI), Dundalk (H) (LOI), Bohemians (H) (FAI), Shamrock Rovers (H) (LOI), Bohemians (H) (LOI), Finn Harps (H) (FAI), Athlone Town (H) (LOI)
Home Alt	Red/White Sleeves	White	White	Worn 1 time; against Drogheda United (A) (LOI)
Away	Blue/Wine Stripes	Blue	Blue	Worn 12 times; against Sligo Rovers (A) (SSC), Derry City (A) (LOI), Bray Wanderers (A) (LOI), Athlone Town (A) (LSC), Sligo Rovers (A) (LOI), Dundalk (A) (LOI), Legia Warsaw (A) (CHL), Derry City (A) (LOI), Shelbourne (A) (FAI), Bray Wanderers (A) (LOI), Sligo Rovers (A) (LOI), Derry City (N) (FAI)
Away Alt	Blue/Wine Stripes	White	White	Worn 1 time; against Longford Town (A) (LSC)

Key:
LOI=League of Ireland
FAI=FAI Cup
EAC= EA Sports Cup
CHL=Champions League
SSC=Setanta Sports Cup
LSC=Leinster Senior Cup
PRC=President's Cup
FRN=Friendly

==== Televised Matches ====
Time and Date	Channel	Competition	Opposition	Score	Location
20:00 GMT 24 February 2014	Setanta Sports	Setanta Cup	Ballinamallard United	1–0 Win	Ferney Park
15:15 GMT 22 March 2014	RTÉ	League of Ireland	Limerick	1–1 Draw	Richmond Park
20:00 GMT 25 March 2014	Setanta Sports	Setanta Cup	Sligo Rovers	2–0 Loss	The Showgrounds
19:05 GMT 4 April 2014	RTÉ	League of Ireland	Dundalk	4–1 Loss	Richmond Park
20:00 GMT 14 April 2014	Setanta Sports	Setanta Cup	Sligo Rovers	5–1 Loss	Richmond Park
20:00 GMT 11 July 2014	Setanta Sports	League of Ireland	Bohemians	1–1 Draw	Dalymount Park
20:45 CET 16 July 2014	Setanta Sports	Champions League	Legia Warsaw	1–1 Draw	Pepsi Arena
19:45 GMT 23 July 2014	Setanta Sports	Champions League	Legia Warsaw	5–0 Loss	Tallaght Stadium
20:00 GMT 15 August 2014	Setanta Sports	League of Ireland	UCD	3–2 Win	Richmond Park
19:05 GMT 5 September 2014	RTÉ	League of Ireland	Dundalk	1–0 Win	Richmond Park
19:05 GMT 19 September 2014	RTÉ	League of Ireland	Bray Wanderers	4–2 Win	Carlisle Grounds
13:45 GMT 5 October 2014	RTÉ	FAI Cup	Finn Harps	6–1 Win	Richmond Park
15:30 GMT 2 November 2014	RTÉ	FAI Cup (Final)	Derry City	2–0 Win	Aviva Stadium

==== Channels ====
Chanel	Airtricity League	FAI Cup	EA Sports Cup	Champions League	Setanta Cup	Leinster Senior Cup	President's Cup	Total
Setanta Sports	2	0	0	2	3	0	0	7
RTÉ	4	2	0	0	0	0	0	6

== Premier Division ==
The 2014 League of Ireland Premier Division fixtures were announced on 20 December 2013. St Patrick's Athletic were revealed to have Cork City at away on the first day of the season. The Saints' first home fixture would be against UCD on the second day of the season.

=== Final Table ===
Pos	Team	Pld	W	D	L	GF	GA	GD	Pts	Qualification or relegation
1	Dundalk (C)	33	22	8	3	73	24	+49	74	Qualification for Champions League second qualifying round
2	Cork City	33	22	6	5	51	25	+26	72	Qualification for Europa League first qualifying round
3	St Patrick's Athletic	33	19	8	6	66	37	+29	65	Qualification for Europa League first qualifying round
4	Shamrock Rovers	33	18	8	7	43	26	+17	62	Qualification for Europa League first qualifying round
5	Sligo Rovers	33	12	7	14	44	36	+8	43	

Rules for classification: 1) points; 2) goal difference; 3) number of goals scored.
(C) Champions

=== Results summary ===
Overall								Home						Away					
Pld	W	D	L	GF	GA	GD	Pts	W	D	L	GF	GA	GD	W	D	L	GF	GA	GD
33	19	8	6	62	36	+26	65	12	2	3	39	21	+18	7	6	3	23	15	+8

Last updated: 1 November 2014.

=== Results by round ===
Round	1	2	3	4	5	6	7	8	9	10	11	12	13	14	15	16	17	18	19	20	21	22	23	24	25	26	27	28	29	30	31	32	33
Ground	A	H	H	A	H	A	H	H	A	H	A	H	A	A	H	A	H	A	A	H	A	H	A	H	H	A	H	A	H	H	A	H	A
Result	D	W	D	D	L	W	W	W	W	W	D	W	D	L	W	D	W	L	D	W	W	W	L	W	L	W	W	W	D	W	W	L	W
Position	4	3	5	5	8	6	5	3	3	2	2	1	3	4	3	3	3	4	3	3	3	3	3	3	3	3	3	3	3	3	3	3	3

Updated to match(es) played on 1 November 2014. Source: 2014 League of Ireland
A = Away; H = Home; W = Win; D = Draw; L = Loss

=== Matches ===
Win Draw Loss

7 March 2014 Round 1	Cork City	1–1	St Patrick's Athletic	Turners Cross, Cork
19:45 GMT	Garry Buckley (yellow card) 22'; John Dunleavy (yellow card) 25'; Gearóid Morrissey (yellow card) 35'; Garry Buckley 41'; Liam Kearney (yellow card) 43'; Billy Dennehy (yellow card) 48'; John Dunleavy (yellow card) 66' (red card)		Christy Fagan 57'; Ken Oman (yellow card) 84'; Kenny Browne (yellow card) 88'	Stadium: Turners Cross; Attendance: 5,322; Referee: Padraigh Sutton

14 March 2014 Round 2	St Patrick's Athletic	3–2	UCD	Inchicore, Dublin
19:45 GMT	Conan Byrne 25'; Ken Oman (yellow card) 41'; Conan Byrne 64'; Kenny Browne (yellow card) 69'; Greg Bolger (yellow card) 78'; Christy Fagan 90+2'		Chris Mulhall 38'; Chris Mulhall 42'; Robbie Creevy (yellow card) 66'	Stadium: Richmond Park; Attendance: 1,400 (Est.); Referee: Paul Tuite

22 March 2014 Round 3	St Patrick's Athletic	1–1	Limerick	Inchicore, Dublin
15:15 GMT	Christy Fagan 50'		Patrick Nzuzi (yellow card) 34'; James McGrath (yellow card) 46'; James McGrath 77'	Stadium: Richmond Park; Attendance: 1,100 (Est.); Referee: Tom Connolly
Note: This fixture was due to be played on Friday 21 March 2014 but was moved to a later date on RTÉ's decision due to their television rights to the game.

28 March 2014 Round 4	Derry City	0–0	St Patrick's Athletic	Derry, Northern Ireland
19:45 GMT	Roddy Collins Jnr. (yellow card) 56'; Danny Ventre (yellow card) 72'		Conan Byrne (yellow card) 44'; Sean Hoare (yellow card) 84'	Stadium: The Brandywell; Attendance: 1,500 (Est.); Referee: Paul McLaughlin

4 April 2014 Round 5	St Patrick's Athletic	1–4	Dundalk	Inchicore, Dublin
19:05 GMT	Chris Forrester 30'; Kenny Browne (yellow card) 36'; Greg Bolger (yellow card) 66'; Killian Brennan (yellow card) 72'; Greg Bolger (red card) 74'; Killian Brennan (yellow card) FT (red card)		John Mountney 50'; John Mountney (yellow card) 52'; Daryl Horgan 62'; Chris Shields (yellow card) 70'; Richie Towell (yellow card) 72'; Darren Meenan (yellow card) 84'; David McMillan 87'; Sean Gannon 90+3'	Stadium: Richmond Park; Attendance: 1,351; Referee: Padraig Sutton

7 April 2014 Round 6	Bray Wanderers	1–3	St Patrick's Athletic	Bray, County Wicklow
19:45 GMT	David Cassidy 81'		Kenny Browne (yellow card) 38'; Christy Fagan 44'; Lee Lynch 51'; Sean Hoare (yellow card) 86'; Chris Forrester 90+2'	Stadium: The Carlisle Grounds; Attendance: 700 (Est.); Referee: Neil Doyle

11 April 2014 Round 7	St Patrick's Athletic	1–0	Shamrock Rovers	Inchicore, Dublin
19:45 GMT	Killian Brennan 45' (pen.); Conor McCormack (yellow card) 59'; Christy Fagan (yellow card) 74'; Chris Forrester (yellow card) 90+1'		Stephen McPhail (yellow card) 13'; Ronan Finn (yellow card) 30'; Luke Byrne (red card) 44'; Ciarán Kilduff (yellow card) 45'	Stadium: Richmond Park; Attendance: 3,200 (Est.); Referee: Dave McKeon

18 April 2014 Round 8	St Patrick's Athletic	3–1	Bohemians	Inchicore, Dublin
19:45 GMT	Christy Fagan 27'; Christy Fagan 64'; Chris Forrester 77'		Jason Byrne 23'; Craig Walsh (yellow card) 54'	Stadium: Richmond Park; Attendance: 2,084; Referee: Graham Kelly

21 April 2014 Round 9	Drogheda United	0–4	St Patrick's Athletic	Drogheda, County Louth
19:45 GMT	Daire Doyle (yellow card) 57'		Lee Lynch 38'; Chris Forrester 41'; Conan Byrne 70'; Chris Forrester 89'	Stadium: United Park; Attendance: 1,700 (Est.); Referee: Rob Rogers

25 April 2014 Round 10	St Patrick's Athletic	4–0	Athlone Town	Inchicore, Dublin
19:45 GMT	James Chambers 11'; Christy Fagan 42'; Lee Lynch 75'; Christy Fagan 77'		Barry Clancy (yellow card) 25'; Derek Prendergast (yellow card) 32'; James O'Brien (yellow card) 65'	Stadium: Richmond Park; Attendance: 1,257; Referee: Paul McLaughlin

3 May 2014 Round 11	Sligo Rovers	2–2	St Patrick's Athletic	Sligo
19:45 GMT	John Russell 21'; John Russell (yellow card) 59'; Danny North 84' (pen.)		Conan Byrne (yellow card) 39'; James Chambers (yellow card) 45'; Ian Bermingham 52'; Kenny Browne (yellow card) 63'; Conan Byrne 76' (pen.); Sean Hoare (yellow card) 80'	Stadium: The Showgrounds; Attendance: 3,481; Referee: Tomas Connolly

9 May 2014 Round 12	St Patrick's Athletic	3–2	Cork City	Inchicore, Dublin
19:45 GMT	Conan Byrne 53' (pen.); Kenny Browne 64'; Kenny Browne (yellow card) 71'; Ger O'Brien (yellow card) 74'; Chris Forrester (yellow card) 79'; Conan Byrne 90+1'		Mark O'Sullivan 15'; Brian Lenihan (yellow card) 53'; Mark McNulty (yellow card) 54'; Dan Murray (yellow card) 76'; Rob Lehane 81'	Stadium: Richmond Park; Attendance: 1,544; Referee: Padraigh Sutton

16 May 2014 Round 13	UCD	1–1	St Patrick's Athletic	Belfield, Dublin
19:45 GMT	Samir Belhout 27'; Colm Crowe (yellow card) 34'; Robbie Benson (yellow card) 84'		Christy Fagan 10'	Stadium: The UCD Bowl; Attendance: 725; Referee: Graeme Kelly

23 May 2014 Round 14	Limerick	2–0	St Patrick's Athletic	Limerick
19:45 GMT	Danny Galbraith 61'; Rory Gaffney (yellow card) 63'; Jason Hughes (yellow card) 72'; Jason Hughes 83'		Ian Bermingham (yellow card) 68'	Stadium: Thomond Park; Attendance: 793; Referee: Paul Tuite

30 May 2014 Round 15	St Patrick's Athletic	5–2	Derry City	Inchicore, Dublin
19:45 GMT	Christy Fagan 13'; Christy Fagan 19'; Conan Byrne 23'; Sean Hoare 48'; Kenny Browne (yellow card) 55'; Christy Fagan 72'		Shane McEleney (yellow card) 48'; Michael Duffy 59'; Rory Patterson 82'	Stadium: Richmond Park; Attendance: 1,200 (Est.); Referee: Paul McLaughlin

2 June 2014 Round 20	St Patrick's Athletic	6–0	Drogheda United	Inchicore, Dublin
19:45 GMT	Chris Forrester 6'; Christy Fagan 16'; Conan Byrne 41'; Keith Fahey (yellow card) 47'; Chris Forrester 48'; Conan Byrne 66'; Conan Byrne 88'		Paul Andrews (yellow card) 88'	Stadium: Richmond Park; Attendance: 997; Referee: David McKeon
Note: This fixture was due to be played on Friday 18 July 2014 but was moved to an earlier date on the FAI's decision due to St Patrick's Athletic's involvement in the 2014–15 UEFA Champions League.

13 June 2014 Round 16	Dundalk	0–0	St Patrick's Athletic	Dundalk, County Louth
19:45 GMT	David McMillan (red card) 70'		Kenny Browne (yellow card) 5'; Killian Brennan (yellow card) 28'; James Chambers (yellow card) 49'; Ken Oman (yellow card) 50'; Ken Oman (red card) 65'	Stadium: Oriel Park; Attendance: 3,135; Referee: Neil Doyle

27 June 2014 Round 17	St Patrick's Athletic	3–2	Bray Wanderers	Inchicore, Dublin
19:45 GMT	Chris Forrester 14'; Christy Fagan 53'; Christy Fagan 73'		David Cassidy (yellow card) 39'; Jake Kelly 40'; Jake Kelly 77'	Stadium: Richmond Park; Attendance: 780; Referee: Anthony Buttimer

5 July 2014 Round 18	Shamrock Rovers	2–1	St Patrick's Athletic	Tallaght, Dublin
19:00 GMT	Dean Kelly 2'; Rob Cornwall (yellow card) 34'; Gary McCabe 54'; Stephen McPhail (red card) 57'		Christy Fagan 11'; Conor McCormack (yellow card) 29'; Keith Fahey (red card) 75'	Stadium: Tallaght Stadium; Attendance: 3,000 (Est.); Referee: Padraigh Sutton
Note: This fixture was due to be played on Friday 4 July 2014 at 8 pm, but was moved to a later date on the Garda Síochána's decision, due to insufficient policing resources on the original date.

11 June 2014 Round 19	Bohemians	1–1	St Patrick's Athletic	Phibsborough, Dublin
20:00 GMT	Eoin Wearen 31'; Anthony Murphy (yellow card) 84'		Mark Quigley 10'; Chris Forrester (yellow card) 23'; Ger O'Brien (yellow card) 65'; Greg Bolger (yellow card) 83'	Stadium: Dalymount Park; Attendance: 1,590; Referee: Derek Tomney

26 July 2014 Round 21	Athlone Town	0–2	St Patrick's Athletic	Athlone, County Westmeath
19:45 GMT	Sean Brennan (yellow card) 45+1'; Barry Clancy (yellow card) 71'		Chris Forrester 7'; Ian Bermingham (yellow card) 44'; Sean Hoare 72'; Sean Hoare (yellow card) 72'; Conan Byrne (yellow card) 74'; Chris Forrester (yellow card) 78'; Derek Foran (yellow card) 90+4'	Stadium: Athlone Town Stadium; Attendance: 583; Referee: Anthony Buttimer
Note: This fixture was due to be played on Friday 25 July 2014, but was moved to a later date due to St Patrick's Athletic's involvement in the 2014–15 UEFA Champions League.

1 August 2014 Round 22	St Patrick's Athletic	1–0	Sligo Rovers	Inchicore, Dublin
19:45 GMT	Chris Forrester 18'; Chris Forrester (yellow card) 76'; Mark Quigley (yellow card) 88'		John Russell (yellow card) 26'; Iarfhlaith Davoren (yellow card) 47'; Danny North (red card) 87'	Stadium: Richmond Park; Attendance: 1,289; Referee: Rob Rogers

8 August 2014 Round 23	Cork City	1–0	St Patrick's Athletic	Turners Cross, Cork
19:45 GMT	Michael McSweeney (yellow card) 13'; Ross Gaynor (yellow card) 49'; Colin Healy 88'		Mark Quigley (yellow card) 58'; Aaron Greene (yellow card) 76'; Mark Quigley (yellow card) 79' (red card)	Stadium: Turners Cross; Attendance: 3,398; Referee: Tomas Connolly

15 August 2014 Round 24	St Patrick's Athletic	3–2	UCD	Inchicore, Dublin
20:00 GMT	Derek Foran (yellow card) 29'; Keith Fahey 45'; Greg Bolger (red card) 57'; Conan Byrne 69'; Ian Bermingham 77'		Colm Crowe (yellow card) 59'; Hugh Douglas 87'; Robbie Benson 90+3'	Stadium: Richmond Park; Attendance: 786; Referee: Rob Harvey

18 August 2014 Round 25	St Patrick's Athletic	0–1	Limerick	Inchicore, Dublin
19:45 GMT	Derek Foran (yellow card) 39'; Ian Bermingham (yellow card) 87'		Jack Doherty (yellow card) 40'; Rory Gaffney 51'; Robbie Williams (yellow card) 58'	Stadium: Richmond Park; Attendance: 911; Referee: Neil Doyle

29 August 2014 Round 26	Derry City	0–1	St Patrick's Athletic	Derry, Northern Ireland
19:45 GMT	Philip Lowry (yellow card) 45'; Stephen Dooley (yellow card) 56'; Shaun Kelly (yellow card) 84'; Ryan McBride (yellow card) 90'		Aaron Greene 47'; Ian Bermingham (yellow card) 90+1'	Stadium: The Brandywell; Attendance: 1,500 (Est.); Referee: Padraigh Sutton

5 September 2014 Round 27	St Patrick's Athletic	1–0	Dundalk	Inchicore, Dublin
19:05 GMT	Christy Fagan 2'; Kenny Browne (yellow card) 45'; Killian Brennan (yellow card) 59'; Greg Bolger (yellow card) 85'; Chris Forrester (yellow card) 90'		Ruaidhrí Higgins (yellow card) 17'; Daryl Horgan (yellow card) 31'; Donal McDermott (yellow card) 76'; Brian Gartland (yellow card) 82'	Stadium: Richmond Park; Attendance: 1,653; Referee: Paul McLaughlin

19 September 2014 Round 28	Bray Wanderers	2–4	St Patrick's Athletic	Bray, County Wicklow
19:05 GMT	Jake Kelly 13' (pen.); Niall Cooney (yellow card) 45'; Adam Hanlon 79'; David Scully (yellow card) 89'		Ken Oman (red card) 12'; Chris Forrester 37'; Keith Fahey 53'; Conan Byrne 54'; Conan Byrne 62'	Stadium: The Carlisle Grounds; Attendance: 700 (Est.); Referee: Paul Tuite

26 September 2014 Round 29	St Patrick's Athletic	1–1	Shamrock Rovers	Inchicore, Dublin
19:45 GMT	James Chambers (yellow card) 48'; Ian Bermingham (yellow card) 58'; Conan Byrne 59'; Keith Fahey (yellow card) 72'; Seán Hoare (yellow card) 84'		Gary McCabe 4'; Gary McCabe (yellow card) 62'; Patrick Cregg (yellow card) 70'; Ciarán Kilduff (yellow card) 84'	Stadium: Richmond Park; Attendance: 2,188; Referee: Tomas Connolly

30 September 2014 Round 30	St Patrick's Athletic	3–1	Bohemians	Inchicore, Dublin
19:45 GMT	Christy Fagan 39'; Aaron Greene 42'; Seán Hoare (yellow card) 62'; Conan Byrne 67'; Conor McCormack (yellow card) 88'		Roberto Lopes (yellow card) 76'; Anthony Murphy 84'; Patrick Kavanagh (yellow card) 90+4'	Stadium: Richmond Park; Attendance: 931; Referee: Dave McKeon
Note: This fixture was originally scheduled for 3 October 2014, but was rescheduled to an earlier date due to St Patrick's Athletic's participation in the FAI Cup Semi-finals on 5 October 2014.

10 October 2014 Round 31	Drogheda United	2–3	St Patrick's Athletic	Drogheda, County Louth
19:45 GMT	Gavan Holohan 38'; Peter McGlynn 71'		Conan Byrne 9'; Greg Bolger (yellow card) 56'; Daire Doyle 89' (o.g.); Christy Fagan 90+1'	Stadium: United Park; Attendance: 700 (Est.); Referee: Jim McKell

17 October 2014 Round 32	St Patrick's Athletic	0–2	Athlone Town	Inchicore, Dublin
19:45 GMT	Christy Fagan (yellow card) 25'; Derek Foran (yellow card) 46'		Kevin Knight (yellow card) 57'; Philip Gorman 62'; James O'Brien (yellow card) 68'; Kaelan Dillon 69'	Stadium: Richmond Park; Attendance: 1,084; Referee: Anthony Buttimer

24 October 2014 Round 33	Sligo Rovers	1–4	St Patrick's Athletic	Sligo
19:45 GMT	Gary Armstrong 50'		Conan Byrne 32'; Richard Brush 49' (o.g.); Christy Fagan 75'; Conan Byrne 90+3'	Stadium: The Showgrounds; Attendance: 910; Referee: Ben Connolly

== Cups ==
=== FAI Cup ===
==== Second round ====
6 June 2014	St. Patrick's CY	0–3	St Patrick's Athletic	Inchicore, Dublin
19:45 GMT	Andrew Doolin (yellow card) 39'; Graham Hannigan (yellow card) 49'; Lee Weafer (yellow card) 84'		Ian Bermingham (yellow card) 21'; Conan Byrne 43'; Keith Fahey 53'; Daryl Kavanagh 87'	Stadium: Richmond Park; Attendance: 672; Referee: Rob Rogers
Note: St. Patrick's CY could not provide a suitable venue to host the fixture, so agreed to play the match in St Patrick's Athletic's Richmond Park home ground.

==== Third round ====
22 August 2014	St Patrick's Athletic	1–1	Shelbourne	Inchicore, Dublin
19:45 GMT	Christy Fagan 3'; Ian Bermingham (yellow card) 8'; Chris Forrester (yellow card) 46'		Alan O'Sullivan 10'; Jordan Keegan (yellow card) 55'	Stadium: Richmond Park; Attendance: 1,293; Referee: Graham Kelly

==== Third round Replay ====
26 August 2014	Shelbourne	P–P	St Patrick's Athletic	Drumcondra, Dublin
20:00 GMT				Stadium: Tolka Park; Attendance: 1,000 (Est.)
Note: The match was officially postponed at 20:20 due to four of the eight floodlight pylons failing, with supporters in the ground still awaiting kick off at the time.

1 September 2014	Shelbourne	0–1	St Patrick's Athletic	Drumcondra, Dublin
20:00 GMT	Adam O'Connor (yellow card) 2'; Ryan Robinson (yellow card) 23'; Luke Gallagher (yellow card) 43'		Conor McCormack (yellow card) 26'; Kenny Browne (yellow card) 42'; Conan Byrne 44'	Stadium: Tolka Park; Attendance: 1,239; Referee: Dave McKeon

==== Quarter-final ====
12 September 2014	St Patrick's Athletic	3–2	Bohemians	Inchicore, Dublin
19:45 GMT	Christy Fagan 23'; Killian Brennan 48'; Christy Fagan 58'; Greg Bolger (yellow card) 62'; Greg Bolger (yellow card) 68' (red card); Mark Quigley (yellow card) 71'; Ger O'Brien (yellow card) 79'		Derek Pender 20'; Dave Mulcahy (yellow card) 47'; Aidan Price 81'	Stadium: Richmond Park; Attendance: 2,158; Referee: Neil Doyle

==== Semi-final ====
5 October 2014	St Patrick's Athletic	6–1	Finn Harps	Inchicore, Dublin
13:45 GMT	Killian Brennan 20'; Seán Hoare 37'; Conan Byrne 44'; Killian Brennan 65'; Christy Fagan 70'; Conan Byrne 78'		Patrick Mailey 29'; Ciarán Coll (yellow card) 45'; Gareth Harkin (red card) 82'; Kevin McHugh (yellow card) 84'; Sean McCarron (yellow card) 88'	Stadium: Richmond Park; Attendance: 1,851; Referee: Derek Tomney

==== Final ====
2 November 2014	Derry City	0–2	St Patrick's Athletic	Ballsbridge, Dublin
15:30 GMT	Ryan McBride (yellow card) 7'; Stephen Dooley (yellow card) 13'; Rory Patterson (yellow card) 90'		Sean Hoare (yellow card) 2'; Christy Fagan 51'; Greg Bolger (yellow card) 62'; Keith Fahey (yellow card) 87'; Killian Brennan (yellow card) 90'; Christy Fagan 90+4'	Stadium: Aviva Stadium; Attendance: 17,038; Referee: Padraigh Sutton

=== EA Sports Cup ===
Win Draw Loss

==== Second round ====
6 May 2014	Bohemians	3–2	St Patrick's Athletic	Phibsborough, Dublin
19:45 GMT	Jake Hyland 7'; Jake Hyland 43'; Daniel Corcoran 82'		Daryl Kavanagh 30'; Killian Brennan 33' (pen.)	Stadium: Dalymount Park; Attendance: 350 (Est.); Referee: David McKeon

=== Champions League ===
The draw for the second qualifying round of the 2014–15 UEFA Champions League will take place on 23 June 2014, with the first leg to be played on 15/16 July and the second leg on the 22/23 July.

Win Draw Loss

==== Second qualifying round ====
16 July 2014 First Leg	(Poland) Legia Warsaw	1–1	(Republic of Ireland) St Patrick's Athletic	Warsaw, Poland
20:45 CET	Ondrej Duda (yellow card) 90'; Miroslav Radović 90+1'		Christy Fagan 39'; Brendan Clarke (yellow card) 45'; Ken Oman (yellow card) 46'	Stadium: Pepsi Arena; Attendance: 15,000 (Est.); Referee: (Romania) Marius Avram

23 July 2014 Second Leg	(Republic of Ireland) St Patrick's Athletic	0–5	(Poland) Legia Warsaw	Dublin, Republic of Ireland
19:45 GMT	Greg Bolger (yellow card) 46'		Ondrej Duda (yellow card) 16'; Miroslav Radović 24'; Michał Żyro 68'; Miroslav Radović 81'; Jakub Kosecki 86'; Conan Byrne 90' (o.g.)	Stadium: Tallaght Stadium; Attendance: 6,000; Referee: (Sweden) Andreas Ekberg

=== Setanta Cup ===
The draw for the 2014 Setanta Sports Cup was made on 11 December 2013 at the Aviva Stadium in Dublin. The clubs set to compete in the competition were 2013 League of Ireland Champions St Patrick's Athletic, 2013 League of Ireland Runners-up Dundalk, 2013 FAI Cup Winners Sligo Rovers and 2013 League of Ireland Cup winners Shamrock Rivers, all from the Republic of Ireland. Representing Northern Ireland, 2012–13 IFA Premiership winners Cliftonville, 2012–13 IFA Premiership Runners-up Crusaders, 2012–13 Irish Cup Winners Glentoran and as Linfield who were next best placed in the league as Cliftonville also won the 2012–13 Irish League Cup. However Cliftonville and Linfield pulled out of the competition to concentrate on their league and cup ambitions, meaning the two next best placed league teams (5th & 6th) from the 2012–13 IFA Premiership would replace them. These sides were Ballinamallard United and Coleraine. The Saints were drawn away to competition débutantes, Ballinamallard United at Ferney Park, County Fermanagh on 24 February 2014 in the first leg, with the return leg at Richmond Park on 10 March.

Win Draw Loss

==== Quarter-final ====
24 February 2014 First Leg	(Northern Ireland) Ballinamallard United	0–1	(Republic of Ireland) St Patrick's Athletic	Fermanagh, Northern Ireland
20:00 GMT	David Kee (yellow card) 37'; Jason McCartney (yellow card) 37'		Chris Forrester 21'; Ger O'Brien (yellow card) 53'; Kenny Browne (yellow card) 89'	Stadium: Ferney Park; Attendance: 500 (Est.); Referee: (Northern Ireland) Mark Courtney

10 March 2014 Second Leg	(Republic of Ireland) St Patrick's Athletic	5–0	(Northern Ireland) Ballinamallard United	Dublin, Republic of Ireland
19:45 GMT	Mark Quigley 12'; Conan Byrne 33'; Conan Byrne 39'; Mark Quigley 62'; Daryl Kavanagh 87'; Chris Forrester (yellow card)		Stuart Hutchinson (yellow card) 12'; Liam Martin (yellow card) 43'	Stadium: Richmond Park; Attendance: 648; Referee: (Republic of Ireland) Rob Rogers

==== Semi-final ====
25 March 2014 First Leg	(Republic of Ireland) Sligo Rovers	2–0	(Republic of Ireland) St Patrick's Athletic	Sligo, Republic of Ireland
20:00 GMT	Danny North 17'; Jeff Henderson (yellow card) 85'; Danny North 90'		Derek Foran (yellow card) 10'; James Chambers (yellow card) 45+1'; James Chambers (yellow card) 71' (red card); Daryl Kavanagh (yellow card) 90+2'	Stadium: The Showgrounds; Attendance: 816; Referee: (Northern Ireland) Mervyn Smith

14 April 2014 Second Leg	(Republic of Ireland) St Patrick's Athletic	1–5	(Republic of Ireland) Sligo Rovers	Dublin, Republic of Ireland
20:00 GMT	Keith Fahey (yellow card) 45+1'; Daryl Kavanagh (yellow card) 58'; Lee Lynch 68'		Aaron Greene 21'; Joseph N'Do 26'; Aaron Greene 39'; Derek Foran 71' (o.g.); John Russell 81'	Stadium: Richmond Park; Attendance: 557; Referee: (Republic of Ireland) Derek Tomney

=== Leinster Senior Cup ===
Having lost the 2013 Leinster Senior Cup Final to Shamrock Rovers just two days after lifting the 2013 League of Ireland trophy, the Saints were hoping to go one step further in the 2014 competition, although the tournament would be last on their priorities of the seven they would play in over the season. Pats were drawn at home to Dundalk, the side who they pipped to the previous season's league title, on 17 February making it their first competitive game of the season.

Win Draw Loss

==== Fourth round ====
17 February 2014	St Patrick's Athletic	2–1	Dundalk	Inchicore, Dublin
19:45 GMT	Keith Fahey (yellow card) 44'; Keith Fahey 63'; Daryl Kavanagh 73'; Daryl Kavanagh (yellow card) 74'		Richie Towell (yellow card) 5'; David McMillan (yellow card) 27'; Ruaidhri Higgins (yellow card) 64'; David McMillan 69'	Stadium: Richmond Park; Attendance: 700 (Est.); Referee: Neil Doyle

==== Quarter-final ====
28 April 2014	Athlone Town	2–3 (a.e.t.)	St Patrick's Athletic	Athlone, Westmeath
19:45 GMT	Jason Marks 8'; Derek Prendergast 37'; Barry Clancy (yellow card) ??? (yellow card) ??? (yellow card)		Sam Verdon 48'; Greg Bolger 77'; Daryl Kavanagh 114'	Stadium: Athlone Town Stadium; Attendance: 200 (Est.); Referee: John McLaughlin

==== Semi-final ====
20 May 2014	St Patrick's Athletic	1–0	Shamrock Rovers	Inchicore, Dublin
19:45 GMT	Ken Oman (yellow card) 34'; Conan Byrne 45'		Ryan Doolin (yellow card) 34'	Stadium: Richmond Park; Attendance: 500 (Est.); Referee: Simon Rogers

==== Final ====
9 September 2014	Longford Town	1–2	St Patrick's Athletic	Mullolagher, Longford
19:45 GMT	Tom Morris 57'; Glen O'Connor (yellow card) 72'		Sam Verdon 34'; James Chambers (yellow card) 45'; Ken Oman (yellow card) 45'; Jack Bayly 64'; Rory Feely (yellow card) 90+1'	Stadium: City Calling Stadium; Attendance: 500 (Est.); Referee: John McLaughlin

=== President's Cup ===
The 2014 season was the first year of the President's Cup. The fixture is between the previous season's league winners and the previous season's cup winners. With St Patrick's Athletic being 2013 League of Ireland Champions, they got home advantage against 2013 FAI Cup winners Sligo Rovers on 2 March 2014.

==== Final ====
2 March 2014	St Patrick's Athletic	1–0	Sligo Rovers	Inchicore, Dublin
16:00 GMT	Keith Fahey 18'; Killian Brennan (yellow card) 59'; Ken Oman (yellow card) 75'			Stadium: Richmond Park; Attendance: 1,330; Referee: Paul McLaughlin

== Friendlies ==
1 February 2014	St Patrick's Athletic	4–1	Shelbourne	Crumlin, Dublin
17:00 GMT	Lorcan Fitzgerald 18'; Killian Brennan 55' (pen.); Sam Verdon 71'; Conor McCormack 72'		??? (penalty missed) 5'; Jordan Keegan 33'	Stadium: Pearse Park; Attendance: 100 (Est.); Referee: Tom Connolly

2 February 2014	Crumlin United	1–3	St Patrick's Athletic	Crumlin, Dublin
15:00 GMT	Ken Oman 16' (o.g.)		Chris Forrester 61'; Peter Durrad 76'; Peter Durrad 78'	Stadium: Pearse Park; Attendance: 100 (Est.); Referee: ???

9 February 2014	St Patrick's Athletic	2–1	Bluebell United	Ashtown, Dublin
17:30 GMT	Ian Bermingham 28'; Peter Durrad 78'		??? 33'	Stadium: Scribblestown; Attendance: 100 (Est.); Referee: Paul Tuite

20 February 2014	NUI Maynooth	1–2	St Patrick's Athletic	Maynooth, Kildare
13:15 GMT	Seamus Doherty 68'		Peter Durrad 81'; Ian Bermingham 90'	Stadium: NUI Maynooth Campus; Attendance: 50 (Est.); Referee: ???

21 June 2014	St Patrick's Athletic	2–2	Aberdeen	Inchicore, Dublin
16:00 GMT	Mark Quigley 2'; Chris Forrester 17'		Adam Rooney 50'; Niall McGinn 60'	Stadium: Richmond Park; Attendance: 500 (Est.)

== Records ==
=== Overall ===
	Total	Home	Away
Games played	51	26	25
Games won	30	18	13
Games drawn	10	3	7
Games lost	10	5	5
Biggest win	6–0 vs Drogheda United	6–0 vs Drogheda United	4–0 vs Drogheda United
Biggest loss	5–0 vs Legia Warsaw	5–0 vs Legia Warsaw	2–0 vs Sligo Rovers, Limerick
Biggest win (League)	6–0 vs Drogheda United	6–0 vs Drogheda United	4–0 vs Drogheda United
Biggest win (Cup)	6–1 vs Finn Harps, 5–0 vs Ballinamallard United	6–1 vs Finn Harps, 5–0 vs Ballinamallard United	3–0 vs St. Patrick's CY
Biggest win (Europe)	N/A	N/A	N/A
Biggest loss (League)	4–1 vs Dundalk	4–1 vs Dundalk	2–0 vs Limerick
Biggest loss (Cup)	5–1 vs Sligo Rovers	5–1 vs Sligo Rovers	2–0 vs Sligo Rovers
Biggest loss (Europe)	5–0 vs Legia Warsaw	5–0 vs Legia Warsaw	N/A
Clean sheets	18	9	9
Goals scored	101	59	42
Goals conceded	60	35	25
Goal difference	+40	+23	+17
Consecutive Victories	6	4	7
Unbeaten run	10	5	7
Consecutive Defeats	1	1	1
Winless Run	4	2	4
Average GF per game	2	2.3	1.7
Average GA per game	1.2	1.3	1
Points (League)	65/99 (66%)	38/51 (75%)	27/48 (56%)
Winning rate	59%	70%	52%
Top scorer	Christy Fagan – 27	Christy Fagan – 18	Christy Fagan, Conan Byrne – 9

Last updated: 3 November 2014
Source: Competitive matches, extratime.ie
