= 2014 Setanta Sports Cup =

Tournament details
- Country: Northern Ireland; Republic of Ireland
- Teams: 8

Final positions
- Champions: Sligo Rovers (1st title)
- Runners-up: Dundalk

Tournament statistics
- Matches played: 13
- Goals scored: 42 (3.23 per match)

The 2014 Setanta Sports Cup was the ninth and final staging of the Setanta Sports Cup, an annual football competition featuring clubs from Northern Ireland and the Republic of Ireland. It commenced on 24 February 2014 and concluded on 10 May 2014 with the final.

Shamrock Rovers were the defending champions, following a comfortable 7–1 win over Drogheda United in the 2013 final. This season's competition was reduced in size from twelve clubs down to eight, with four clubs representing each league. The competition was originally going to feature Linfield, who were inaugural winners of this competition in 2005 and had appeared in all eight editions of the competition to date, and 2012–13 IFA Premiership champions Cliftonville. However, both clubs declined the invitation to take part. The clubs cited the difficulty faced by supporters to attend away games, inconvenient match scheduling, and the reduced prize fund as reasons for deciding not to enter. As a result, the fifth and sixth placed sides from the 2012–13 IFA Premiership – Ballinamallard United and Coleraine – were drafted in as replacements.

The competition featured two-legged quarter-finals, semi-finals, and a single-match final.

== Prize money ==
A prize fund of €73,000 (£60,000) was distributed in the competition, with €33,000 going to the winners, the runners-up collecting €13,000, and the other six participants collecting €4,500 each.

- Winners: €33,000 (£27,000)
- Runners-up: €13,000 (£10,700)
- Semi-finalists: €4,500 (£3,700)
- Quarter-finalists: €4,500 (£3,700)

== Qualifiers ==
The following clubs entered this year's competition:

Republic of Ireland

- Dundalk (2013 League of Ireland runners-up)
- Shamrock Rovers (holders)
- Sligo Rovers (2013 FAI Cup winners)
- St Patrick’s Athletic (2013 League of Ireland champions)

Northern Ireland

- Ballinamallard United (5th in 2012–13 IFA Premiership)
- Coleraine (6th in 2012–13 IFA Premiership)
- Crusaders (2012–13 IFA Premiership runners-up)
- Glentoran (2012–13 Irish Cup winners)

== Quarter-finals ==
The quarter-final draw was made on 11 December 2013, with the first legs played on 24 February 2014 and the second legs played on 10 and 17 March 2014. The four League of Ireland and four IFA Premiership clubs played each other in the quarter-finals over two games (home and away) with the winners qualifying for the semi-finals. Clubs from the same association were kept apart for the draw. All four League of Ireland clubs defeated their Northern Irish Premiership opponents.

Team 1	Agg.	Team 2	1st leg	2nd leg
Shamrock Rovers (Republic of Ireland)	5–1	(Northern Ireland) Glentoran	5–1	0–0
Crusaders (Northern Ireland)	1–9	(Republic of Ireland) Sligo Rovers	1–4	0–5
Dundalk (Republic of Ireland)	4–3	(Northern Ireland) Coleraine	2–3	2–0
Ballinamallard United (Northern Ireland)	0–6	(Republic of Ireland) St Patrick’s Athletic	0–1	0–5

=== First Legs ===
24 February 2014
19:45 GMT

Shamrock Rovers	5 – 1	Glentoran
Bayly 8'; Waters 62'; McPhail 75'; McCabe 81'; Madden 90+4'	Report	McGuigan 24'

Tallaght Stadium, Dublin
Attendance: 2,000
Referee: Neil Doyle

24 February 2014
19:45 GMT

Crusaders	1 – 4	Sligo Rovers
Caddell 72'	Report	Odhiambo 17', 45+1', 62'; Greene 39'

Seaview, Belfast
Attendance: 300
Referee: Raymond Crangle

24 February 2014
19:45 GMT

Dundalk	2 – 3	Coleraine
Horgan 18'; McMillan 60'	Report	McDaid 34', 49'; Harkin 58'

Oriel Park, Dundalk
Attendance: 1,500
Referee: Paul McLaughlin

24 February 2014
20:00 GMT

Ballinamallard United	0 – 1	St Patrick's Athletic
	Report	Forrester 22'

Ferney Park, Ballinamallard
Attendance: 500
Referee: Mark Courtney

=== Second Legs ===
10 March 2014
19:45 GMT

St Patrick's Athletic	5 – 0	Ballinamallard United
Quigley 12', 62'; Byrne 33', 39'; Kavanagh 87'	Report

Richmond Park, Dublin
Attendance: 648
Referee: Rob Rogers

St Patrick's Athletic won 6–0 on aggregate.

10 March 2014
19:45 GMT

Sligo Rovers	5 – 0	Crusaders
McMillan 11'; North 34', 41'; Gaynor 60'; Flatley 85'	Report

The Showgrounds, Sligo
Attendance: 1,500
Referee: Arnold Hunter

Sligo Rovers won 9–1 on aggregate.

10 March 2014
19:45 GMT

Coleraine	0 – 2	Dundalk
	Report	Hoban 51'; O'Donnell 90+2'

The Showgrounds, Coleraine
Referee: Ray Hetherington

Dundalk won 4–3 on aggregate.

17 March 2014
19:45 GMT

Glentoran	0 – 0	Shamrock Rovers
	Report

The Oval, Belfast
Referee: Mervyn Smith

Shamrock Rovers won 5–1 on aggregate.

== Semi-finals ==
The winners of the four quarter-finals entered this round, with the same format as the quarter-finals.

Team 1	Agg.	Team 2	1st leg	2nd leg
Shamrock Rovers (Republic of Ireland)	1−3	(Republic of Ireland) Dundalk	1−2	0–1
Sligo Rovers (Republic of Ireland)	7−1	(Republic of Ireland) St Patrick's Athletic	2−0	5–1

=== First Legs ===
24 March 2014
19:45 GMT

Shamrock Rovers	1 − 2	Dundalk
Zayed 84'	Report	Towell 11' (pen.), 33' (pen.)

Tallaght Stadium, Dublin
Attendance: 750
Referee: Paul Tuite

25 March 2014
19:45 GMT

Sligo Rovers	2 − 0	St Patrick's Athletic
North 17', 90'	Report

The Showgrounds, Sligo
Attendance: 816
Referee: Mervyn Smith

=== Second Legs ===
14 April 2014
19:45 IST

St Patrick's Athletic	1 − 5	Sligo Rovers
Lynch 68'	Report	Greene 21', 39'; N'Do 26'; Foran 71' (o.g.); Russell 81'

Richmond Park, Dublin
Attendance: 557
Referee: Derek Tomney

Sligo Rovers won 7–1 on aggregate.

15 April 2014
19:45 IST

Dundalk	1 − 0	Shamrock Rovers
Shields 47'	Report

Oriel Park, Dundalk
Attendance: 1,976
Referee: Raymond Crangle

Dundalk won 3–1 on aggregate.

== Final ==
10 May 2014
16:00 IST

Dundalk	0 − 1	Sligo Rovers
	Report	O'Conor 13'

Tallaght Stadium, Dublin
Attendance: 2,600
Referee: Arnold Hunter
