= 2014 FAI Cup final =

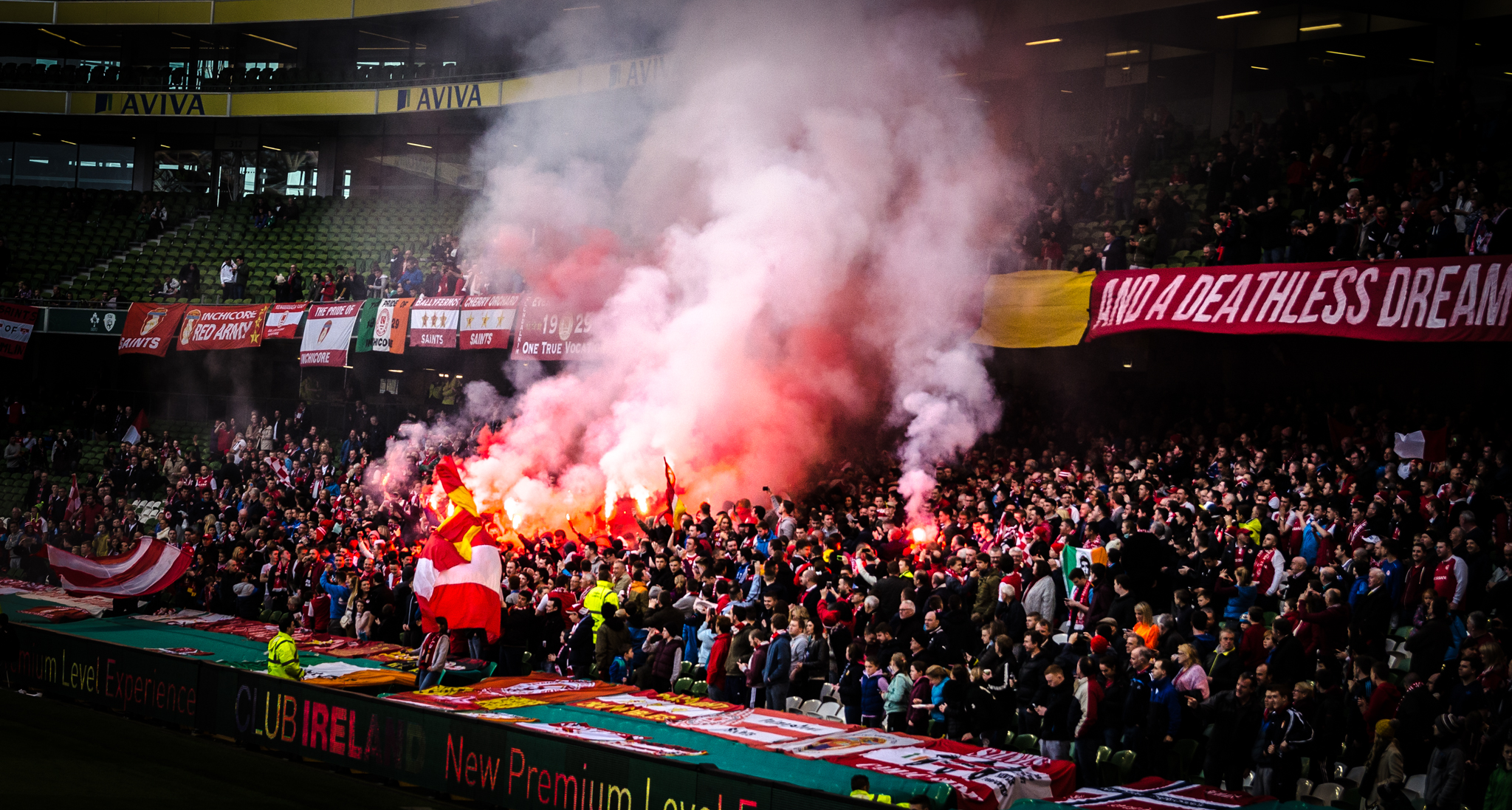
- St Pats fans before kickoff at the 2014 final
- Event: 2014 FAI Cup
Derry City	St Patrick's Athletic
0	2
- Date: 2 November 2014
- Venue: Aviva Stadium, Dublin
- Man of the Match: Greg Bolger
- Referee: Padraigh Sutton
- Attendance: 17,038

The 2014 FAI Cup final was the final match of the 2014 FAI Cup, the national association football cup of the Republic of Ireland. The match took place on 2 November 2014 at the Aviva Stadium in Dublin, and was contested between Derry City and St Patrick's Athletic, with St. Pat's being the winners by two goals to nil.

The match was broadcast live on RTÉ Two and RTÉ Two HD in Ireland, and via the RTÉ Player worldwide.

Christy Fagan scored twice for St Patrick's Athletic as they beat Derry City 2–0.

== Match ==
2 November 2014
15.30 GMT

Derry City	0–2	St Patrick's Athletic
	Report	Fagan 52', 90+4'

Aviva Stadium
Attendance: 17,038
Referee: Padraigh Sutton

Derry City	St Patrick's Athletic

GK	1	(Republic of Ireland) Gerard Doherty
RB	8	(England) Danny Ventre
CB	5	(Northern Ireland) Ryan McBride	(yellow card) 7'	(substituted off) 65'
CB	30	(Republic of Ireland) Aaron Barry
LB	3	(Northern Ireland) Dean Jarvis
RM	22	(Northern Ireland) Stephen Dooley	(yellow card) 13'
CM	18	(Northern Ireland) Philip Lowry
CM	4	(Republic of Ireland) Barry Molloy (c)
CM	10	(Republic of Ireland) Patrick McEleney		(substituted off) 90+2'
LM	14	(Republic of Ireland) Michael Duffy
ST	11	(Republic of Ireland) Rory Patterson	(yellow card) 90+1'
Substitutes:
GK	20	(Republic of Ireland) Ciaran Gallagher
CB	6	(Republic of Ireland) Shane McEleney
CM	7	(Northern Ireland) Barry McNamee		(substituted on) 65'
RM	12	(Northern Ireland) Joshua Treacy
CM	16	(Republic of Ireland) Sean Houston		(substituted on) 90+2'
LM	19	(Republic of Ireland) Mark Timlin
ST	23	(Northern Ireland) Ryan Curran
Manager:
(Northern Ireland) Peter Hutton

GK	1	(Republic of Ireland) Brendan Clarke
RB	2	(Republic of Ireland) Ger O'Brien (c)		(substituted off) 80'
CB	20	(Republic of Ireland) Seán Hoare	(yellow card) 2'
CB	15	(Republic of Ireland) Kenny Browne
LB	3	(Republic of Ireland) Ian Bermingham
RM	7	(Republic of Ireland) Conan Byrne
CM	8	(Republic of Ireland) Keith Fahey	(yellow card) 87'	(substituted off) 90+4'
CM	6	(Republic of Ireland) Greg Bolger	(yellow card) 62'
CM	11	(Republic of Ireland) Killian Brennan	(yellow card) 90'
LM	17	(Republic of Ireland) Chris Forrester		(substituted off) 90+2'
ST	9	(Republic of Ireland) Christy Fagan	52'	90+4'
Substitutes:
GK	25	(England) Pat Jennings
CB	4	(Republic of Ireland) Derek Foran
CB	5	(Republic of Ireland) Ken Oman
LB	12	(Republic of Ireland) Lorcan Fitzgerald		(substituted on) 90+2'
CM	14	(Republic of Ireland) James Chambers		(substituted on) 90+4'
RB	22	(Republic of Ireland) Conor McCormack		(substituted on) 80'
ST	23	(Republic of Ireland) Peter Durrad
Manager:
(Republic of Ireland) Liam Buckley
