= Pat Jennings Jr. =

English footballer (born 1979)

Pat Jennings
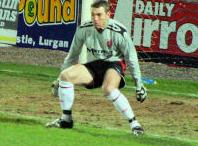

Personal information
- Full name: Patrick Jennings
- Date of birth: 24 September 1979 (age 47)
- Place of birth: Hertfordshire, England
- Position: Goalkeeper

Team information
- Current team: St Patrick's Athletic (goalkeeping coach)

Youth career
- Tottenham Hotspur

Senior career*
Years	Team	Apps	(Gls)
2000–2003	UCD	43	(0)
2004–2010	Derry City	50	(0)
2008	→ Sligo Rovers (loan)	3	(0)
2010	Shamrock Rovers	0	(0)
2011	Glenavon	5	(0)
2012	Athlone Town	26	(0)
2013–2018	St Patrick's Athletic	1	(0)
Total		128	(0)

Managerial career
- 2013–: St Patrick's Athletic (goalkeeping coach)
- * Club domestic league appearances and goals

Patrick Jennings (born 24 September 1979), commonly known as Pat Jennings Jr., is an English former professional football goalkeeper who is goalkeeping coach of League of Ireland club St Patrick's Athletic. He is the son of Northern Ireland international, Pat Jennings.

== Early life ==
Jennings attended The Broxbourne School in Hertfordshire, along with the sons of his father's fellow Tottenham Hotspur players Chris Hughton, Osvaldo Ardiles and his father's goalkeeping contemporary Ray Clemence.

== Career ==
Jennings started his career at Tottenham Hotspur before joining UCD in January 2001 on a Sports Management Soccer Scholarship. He moved north to Derry City after several seasons at Belfield Park.

At Derry, Jennings unsuccessfully tried to displace first-choice keeper David Forde, but rejected offers to leave the club at the end of the 2005 season. Jennings was able to be the hero for Derry in the 2006 League of Ireland Cup final against Shelbourne as he came on from the substitute's bench at The Brandywell to fill the place of Forde, who had been sent off in the 84th minute of play. The game went to penalties with Jennings saving all of Shelbourne's attempts.

With the departure of Forde to Cardiff City at the end of the 2006 season, Jennings began the 2007 season as Derry coach Pat Fenlon's first-choice goalkeeper despite the signing of Ola Tidman.

Jennings joined Sligo on loan for the 2008 season.

Jennings signed for Shamrock Rovers in July 2010 but never played competitively.

In March 2011 he signed for Glenavon until the end of the 2010–11 season. On his debut he scored an own goal.

In March 2012 he joined Athlone Town.

Jennings signed for St Patrick's Athletic as a goalkeeper coach to goalkeepers Brendan Clarke and Dave Ryan for the 2013 season. Ryan picked up an injury towards the end of pre-season and Jennings was signed up as the club's third choice goalkeeper on 6 March. With Pats' sub keeper Rene Gilmartin picking up an injury in a Setanta Cup game, Jennings was once again signed up as cover to Brendan Clarke for the 2014 season. With Gilmartin out injured, manager Liam Buckley decided not to risk injury to Clarke for the Leinster Senior Cup quarter-final away to Athlone Town and gave Jennings his debut as Pats won 3–2 after extra time against Jennings' old club. Jennings played in the 2014 Leinster Senior Cup Final on 9 September 2014, as Pats beat Longford Town 2–1 to become champions. His next appearance came on 22 September 2015 in the 2015 Leinster Senior Cup Semi-final vs. Dundalk. With first choice keeper Brendan Clarke out for the season with a broken finger, manager Liam Buckley opted not to risk young stand-in keeper Conor O'Malley in the competition of least importance to the club and played Jennings, two days before his 36th birthday, as Pats lost 1–0, despite Jennings saving a John Mountney penalty in the 59th minute.

== Personal life ==
Jennings married former Miss Ireland, Sarah Morrissey at a ceremony in Tuscany in 2014.

== Honours ==
Derry City

- FAI Cup: 2006
- League of Ireland Cup: 2005, 2006, 2007

St Patrick's Athletic

- League of Ireland Premier Division: 2013
- FAI Cup: 2014
- League of Ireland Cup: 2015, 2016
- President of Ireland's Cup: 2014
- Leinster Senior Cup: 2013–14
