= 2013 Setanta Sports Cup =

Tournament details
- Country: Northern Ireland; Republic of Ireland
- Teams: 12

Final positions
- Champions: Shamrock Rovers (2nd title)
- Runners-up: Drogheda United

Tournament statistics
- Matches played: 21
- Goals scored: 66 (3.14 per match)

The 2013 Setanta Sports Cup was the eighth staging of the Setanta Sports Cup, an annual football competition featuring clubs from Northern Ireland and Republic of Ireland. It commenced on 11 February 2013 and ended on 11 May 2013 with the final played at the Tallaght Stadium, Dublin.

Crusaders were the defending champions, after they defeated Derry City 5–4 on penalties in the 2012 final, when the match ended 2–2 after extra time. However, this season they went out 4–1 on aggregate in the quarter-finals to Cork City. Shamrock Rovers were the eventual winners for the second time overall, following a comfortable 7–1 win over Drogheda United in the final. This season's competition was notable for the fact that all four semi-finalists represented the Republic of Ireland. It was also the sixth time in the eight competitions played thus far that the winner had been a League of Ireland club.

== Qualifiers ==
The following clubs qualified to take part in this year's competition. The eight unseeded clubs entered in the first round, while the four seeded clubs entered in the quarter-finals.

Seeded teams

- (Northern Ireland) Crusaders (holders)
- (Republic of Ireland) Derry City (2012 FAI Cup winners)
- (Northern Ireland) Linfield (2011–12 IFA Premiership champions and 2011–12 Irish Cup winners)
- (Republic of Ireland) Sligo Rovers (2012 League of Ireland Premier Division champions)

Unseeded teams

- (Northern Ireland) Cliftonville
- (Northern Ireland) Coleraine
- (Republic of Ireland) Cork City
- (Republic of Ireland) Drogheda United
- (Northern Ireland) Glentoran
- (Northern Ireland) Portadown
- (Republic of Ireland) St Patrick’s Athletic
- (Republic of Ireland) Shamrock Rovers

== First round ==
The first round draw was made on 6 December 2012. Four League of Ireland and four IFA Premiership clubs played each other in the first round over two games with the winners qualifying for the quarter-finals. The first legs were played on 11 February 2013 and the second legs were played on 18 February 2013.

Team 1	Agg.	Team 2	1st leg	2nd leg
Cork City (Republic of Ireland)	6–2	(Northern Ireland) Cliftonville	4–0	2–2
Drogheda United (Republic of Ireland)	8–2	(Northern Ireland) Portadown	3–2	5–0
Shamrock Rovers (Republic of Ireland)	2–1	(Northern Ireland) Coleraine	0–1	2–0
St Patrick's Athletic (Republic of Ireland)	0–1	(Northern Ireland) Glentoran	0–0	0–1

=== First leg ===
11 February 2013
19:30

St Patrick's Athletic	0 – 0	Glentoran
Flood (yellow card) 85'	Report	Birney (yellow card) 15'; Magee (yellow card) 68'; Kane (yellow card) 77'; Hill (yellow card) 82'

Richmond Park, Dublin
Attendance: 1,041
Referee: Derek Tomney

11 February 2013
19:45

Cork City	4 – 0	Cliftonville
G. Morrissey 16'; Turner 26' (pen.), 45+1'} Kavanagh 69'	Report

Turners Cross, Cork
Attendance: 1,273
Referee: Pádraig Sutton

=== Second leg ===
18 February 2013
19:30

Coleraine	0 – 2	Shamrock Rovers
	Report	Quigley 5' (yellow card) 73'; McCabe (yellow card) 53'; Sullivan (yellow card) 66'; Kilduff 90'

The Showgrounds, Coleraine
Referee: Arnold Hudson

Shamrock Rovers won 2−1 on aggregate.

18 February 2013
19:45

Glentoran	1 – 0	St Patrick's Athletic
Murray 62'	Report	Fagan (yellow card) 42'

The Oval, Belfast
Referee: Hugh Carvill

Glentoran won 1−0 on aggregate.

18 February 2013
19:45

Cliftonville	2 – 2	Cork City
Boyce 38'; Garrett 87'	Report	Horgan 15'; Furlong 52'; Morrissey (yellow card) 72'; Spillane (red card) 90+2'

Solitude, Belfast
Referee: Ross Dunlop

Cork City won 6−2 on aggregate.

18 February 2013
19:45

Portadown	0 – 5	Drogheda United
Murray (yellow card) 10'; McNeill (yellow card) 61'; Ramsey (yellow card) 64'; Burns (yellow card) 89'	Report	Byrne 1'; O'Conor 12'; Brennan 55'; Cassidy 78'; Hand 90+3'

Shamrock Park, Portadown
Referee: Paul McLaughlin

Drogheda United won 8−2 on aggregate.

== Quarter-finals ==
The winners of the four first-round games joined the four seeded teams in the quarter-finals. The first legs were played on 26 February and 4 March, while the second legs were played on 4 and 11 March 2013.

Team 1	Agg.	Team 2	1st leg	2nd leg
Cork City (Republic of Ireland)	4–1	(Northern Ireland) Crusaders	1–0	3–1
Derry City (Republic of Ireland)	2–3	(Republic of Ireland) Drogheda United	1–1	1–2
Shamrock Rovers (Republic of Ireland)	7–2	(Northern Ireland) Linfield	4–1	3–1
Sligo Rovers (Republic of Ireland)	8–0	(Northern Ireland) Glentoran	5–0	3–0

=== First leg ===
26 February 2013
19:45

Cork City	1 – 0	Crusaders
D Morrissey 88'	Report

Turners Cross, Cork
Attendance: 1,026
Referee: Alan Kelly

4 March 2013
19:45

Sligo Rovers	5 – 0	Glentoran
Lynch 2', 38'; Elding 20'; Connolly 36'; McMillan 53'	Report

Showgrounds, Sligo
Attendance: 1,235

4 March 2013
19:45

Derry City	1 – 1	Drogheda United
Patterson 10' (yellow card) 43'	Report	Prendergast (yellow card) 4'; O'Brien 53'; Sava (yellow card) 66'

The Brandywell, Derry
Attendance: 1,000
Referee: Ray Hetherington

4 March 2013
20:30

Shamrock Rovers	4 – 1	Linfield
Finn 34' (yellow card) 50'; Powell (yellow card) 42'; Kilduff 45', 73'; Rice 82'	Report	Mulgrew (yellow card) 23'; McCaul (yellow card) 31'; Burns 62' (yellow card) 72'

Tallaght Stadium, Dublin
Attendance: 3,500
Referee: Neil Doyle

=== Second leg ===
4 March 2013
19:45

Crusaders	1 – 3	Cork City
Heatley 89'	Report	Morrissey (yellow card) 55'; D Horgan 62'; Kavanagh 67'; Magowan 89' (o.g.)

Seaview, Belfast
Attendance: 600
Referee: David Baxter

Cork City won 4−1 on aggregate.

11 March 2013
19:45

Glentoran	0 – 3	Sligo Rovers
Clarke (yellow card) 59'	Report	Lynch 7'; Cretaro 25'; Henderson (yellow card) 62'; Martin 85'

The Oval, Belfast
Attendance: 150
Referee: Bob Rogers

Sligo Rovers won 8−0 on aggregate.

11 March 2013
19:45

Drogheda United	2 – 1	Derry City
Prendergast 68'; R. Brennan 90+4'	Report	McEleney (yellow card) 37'; McBride (red card) 48'; Rafter 64'

Hunky Dorys Park, Drogheda
Referee: Neil Doyle

Drogheda United won 3−2 on aggregate.

11 March 2013
19:45

Linfield	1 – 3	Shamrock Rovers
Armstrong (yellow card) 4' (goal) 26'	Report	Stewart 32', 69'; McCormack (yellow card) 53'; Dennehy 80'

Windsor Park, Belfast

Shamrock Rovers won 7−2 on aggregate.

== Semi-finals ==
The first legs of the semi-finals will be played on 16 April and the second legs on 22 April.

Team 1	Agg.	Team 2	1st leg	2nd leg
Drogheda United (Republic of Ireland)	2−1	(Republic of Ireland) Sligo Rovers	2−0	0−1
Shamrock Rovers (Republic of Ireland)	3−3	(Republic of Ireland) Cork City	1−1	2−2

=== First leg ===
16 April 2013
19:30

Shamrock Rovers	1 − 1	Cork City
D. Murphy 39' (o.g.)	Report	Kavanagh 41'; Healy (yellow card) 81'

Tallaght Stadium, Dublin
Attendance: 1,250
Referee: Neil Doyle

16 April 2013
19:45

Drogheda United	2 − 0	Sligo Rovers
O'Neill 24'; Cassidy 35'; Grimes (yellow card) 52'	Report

Hunky Dorys Park, Drogheda
Attendance: 756
Referee: Mark Courtney

=== Second leg ===
22 April 2013
19:30

Cork City	2 − 2	Shamrock Rovers
Horgan 45+1'; Kavanagh (yellow card) 63' (goal) 87'	Report	Foran (yellow card) 29'; Rice (yellow card) 32' (goal) 72'; Dennehy (yellow card) 54' (goal) 90+3'

Turners Cross, Cork
Attendance: 2,007
Referee: Padraigh Sutton

3–3 on aggregate. Shamrock Rovers won on away goals

22 April 2013
19:45

Sligo Rovers	1 − 0	Drogheda United
Cawley 30' (yellow card) 46'; Ventre (yellow card) 71'	Report	O'Neill (yellow card) 24'; Cassidy (yellow card) 39'

Showgrounds, Sligo
Attendance: 1,286
Referee: Arnie Hunter

Drogheda United won 2−1 on aggregate.

== Final ==
11 May 2013
15:00

Shamrock Rovers	7 − 1	Drogheda United
Chambers 11'; O'Connor 13'; Sheppard 45'; Finn 55', 56'; Dennehy 75', 88'	Report	O'Neill 65'

Tallaght Stadium, Dublin
Attendance: 4,022
Referee: Rob Rogers
