= Kenny Browne =

Irish footballer (born 1986)

Personal information
- Full name: Kenneth Browne
- Date of birth: 7 August 1986 (age 40)
- Place of birth: Waterford, Ireland
- Height: 1.91 m (6 ft 3 in)
- Position: Centre-back

Senior career*
Years	Team	Apps	(Gls)
2004–2010	Waterford	117	(8)
2010–2011	Sporting Fingal	30	(2)
2011	Waterford	28	(2)
2012–2015	St Patrick's Athletic	104	(1)
2016–2017	Cork City	26	(2)
2017–2019	Waterford	64	(2)
Total		369	(17)
- * Club domestic league appearances and goals

Kenny Browne (born 7 August 1986) is an Irish former footballer who played as a centre-back. He played in the League of Ireland for Waterford United, Sporting Fingal, St Patrick's Athletic, Cork City and Waterford.

Browne joined Waterford United from Bohemians in 2004 and became a regular first-team player in 2006. He was voted the supporters' Player of the Year in 2009. After stints at Sporting Fingal and Waterford United, Browne joined St Patrick's Athletic in 2012. He helped the club win the League of Ireland Premier Division in 2013, the FAI Cup in 2014 and the League of Ireland Cup in 2015. He joined Cork City and helped the club win the 2016 FAI Cup. Browne returned to Waterford in 2017 and helped the club win the League of Ireland First Division and gain promotion to the Premier Division. He announced his retirement in January 2020.

== Club career ==
=== Waterford United ===
Browne joined Waterford United in 2004 after playing for local side Bohemians. He became a regular first-team player in 2006. An injury restricted his appearances in 2007, before he returned to regular first-team action in 2008. In 2009, Browne was voted the Waterford supporters' Player of the Year.

=== Sporting Fingal ===
Browne joined Sporting Fingal in 2010. He made 30 league appearances as the club finished fourth in the Premier Division.

=== Return to Waterford ===
Browne returned to Waterford United in 2011 and made 28 league appearances.

=== St Patrick's Athletic ===
Browne joined St Patrick's Athletic in January 2012. He made 28 league appearances in his first season and 29 in 2013, when St Patrick's Athletic won the league title. He made 27 league appearances in 2014 and was part of the St Patrick's Athletic team that won the FAI Cup. In 2015, Browne made 18 league appearances and was part of the squad that won the League Cup.

=== Cork City ===
Browne joined Cork City in November 2015. He made 26 league appearances in 2016 and won the FAI Cup with the club. Browne was named to the 2016 PFAI Premier Division Team of the Year.

=== Return to Waterford ===
Browne returned to Waterford in 2017. He made 23 league appearances during the season as Waterford won the First Division and secured promotion. Browne remained with Waterford for the 2018 Premier Division season and re-signed for the club in January 2019. He described his 2019 season as difficult because of injuries.

Browne announced his retirement from League of Ireland football on 24 January 2020, aged 33.

== Career statistics ==
Appearances and goals by club, season and competition
Club	Season	League			National Cup		League Cup		Europe		Other		Total	
Club	Season	Division	Apps	Goals	Apps	Goals	Apps	Goals	Apps	Goals	Apps	Goals	Apps	Goals
Waterford	2004	LOI Premier Division	3	0	2	0	0	0	—		—		5	0
Waterford	2005	LOI Premier Division	15	0	0	0	1	0	—		—		16	0
Waterford	2006	LOI Premier Division	21	3	3	0	0	0	—		2 (Note: Appearances in the 2006 League of Ireland Promotion/Relegation Playoffs)	1	26	4
Waterford	2007	LOI Premier Division	18	0	3	0	1	0	—		2 (Note: Appearances in the 2007 League of Ireland Promotion/Relegation Playoffs)	1	24	1
Waterford	2008	LOI First Division	32	3	0	0	1	1	—		—		33	4
Waterford	2009	LOI First Division	28	2	6	0	4	2	—		2 (Note: Appearances in the Munster Senior Cup)	0	40	4
Waterford	Total		117	8	14	0	5	3	—		6	2	142	13
Sporting Fingal	2010	LOI Premier Division	30	2	5	0	1	0	2 (Note: Appearances in the UEFA Europa League)	0	1 (Note: Appearances in the Leinster Senior Cup)	0	39	2
Waterford	2011	LOI First Division	28	2	2	0	2	0	—		1	0	33	2
St Patrick's Athletic	2012	LOI Premier Division	30	0	4	1	2	0	6	0	2 (Note: Appearances in the Setanta Sports Cup)	0	44	1
St Patrick's Athletic	2013	LOI Premier Division	29	0	3	0	0	0	2	0	3 (Note: 1 appearance in the Setanta Sports Cup; 2 appearances, 2 goals in the Leinster Senior Cup)	2	37	2
St Patrick's Athletic	2014	LOI Premier Division	27	1	4	0	1	0	2 (Note: Appearances in the UEFA Champions League)	0	3 (Note: 1 appearance in the President of Ireland's Cup; 1 appearance in the Setanta Sports Cup; 1 appearance in the Leinster Senior Cup)	0	37	1
St Patrick's Athletic	2015	LOI Premier Division	18	0	0	0	3	0	2	0	1	0	24	0
St Patrick's Athletic	Total		104	1	11	1	6	0	12	0	9	2	142	4
Cork City	2016	LOI Premier Division	26	2	5	0	0	0	6	0	2 (Note: 1 appearance in the President of Ireland's Cup; 1 appearance in the Munster Senior Cup)	0	39	2
Cork City	2017	LOI Premier Division	—		—		—		—		2	0	2	0
Cork City	Total		26	2	5	0	0	0	6	0	4	0	41	2
Waterford	2017	LOI First Division	23	1	1	0	1	0	—		—		25	1
Waterford	2018	LOI Premier Division	27	1	2	0	1	0	—		—		30	1
Waterford	2019	LOI Premier Division	14	0	3	1	2	0	—		0	0	19	1
Waterford	Total		64	2	6	0	4	0	—		0	0	49	2
Career total			369	17	43	1	18	3	20	0	21	4	436	25

== Honours ==
=== Club ===
St Patrick's Athletic

- League of Ireland Premier Division: 2013
- FAI Cup: 2014
- League of Ireland Cup: 2015
- President of Ireland's Cup: 2014
- Leinster Senior Cup: 2013–14

Cork City

- FAI Cup: 2016
- President of Ireland's Cup: 2016, 2017

Waterford

- League of Ireland First Division: 2017

=== Individual ===
- PFAI First Division Team of the Year: 2008, 2009, 2017
- PFAI Premier Division Team of the Year: 2013, 2016
- Waterford United Supporters' Player of the Year: 2009
