= Lee Lynch (footballer) =

Irish association footballer

Personal information
- Full name: Lee Jordan Lynch
- Date of birth: 27 November 1991 (age 34)
- Place of birth: Limerick, Ireland
- Position: Midfielder

Youth career
- 2008–2010: West Bromwich Albion

Senior career*
Years	Team	Apps	(Gls)
2010–2011	Jerez Industrial	20	(5)
2011	Drogheda United	12	(1)
2012–2013	Sligo Rovers	53	(5)
2014	St Patrick's Athletic	16	(3)
2014	Limerick	12	(1)
2015	Hamilton Academical	0	(0)
2015–2018	Limerick	74	(9)
2018	FC Arizona	5	(0)
2018	Sligo Rovers	11	(0)
2019–2022	Larne	91	(15)
2022–2024	Coleraine	67	(3)
2024–2025	Treaty United	27	(2)

International career
2008	Republic of Ireland U17	2	(2)
- * Club domestic league appearances and goals as of 3 July 2024

Lee Lynch (born 27 November 1991) is an Irish footballer who last played for League of Ireland First Division side Treaty United.

== Career ==
=== Early career ===
Lee Lynch began his playing career with former Limerick club Roxboro United, followed by Summerville and finally Regional United where he played until the age of 16. He won two All-Ireland senior soccer titles with Limerick CBS. From there he moved to England to sign for West Bromwich Albion. He played an important role with the youth team there and progressed to play for their reserves where he made 20 appearances. After two years he left in 2010. He then moved to Spain and signed with the Glenn Hoddle Academy playing with Jerez for the 2010–11 season.

=== Drogheda United ===
Lynch returned home to Ireland in July 2011 to sign for Drogheda United midway through the season. He played every game until the end of the season scoring four goals from 14 games. He was named Fans' Player of the Year as he helped them keep their Premier Division status that season.

=== Sligo Rovers ===
Lynch's performances in Drogheda didn't go unnoticed and he signed for top four team Sligo Rovers on 6 January 2012. Aged 19 he quickly established himself in the first-team scoring his first goal against Bohemians in the third game of the season to give his new club a 3–0 win. He helped the club to win the league that season missing only three games and contributing three goals. He made 36 appearances in all competitions scoring four goals. After missing the first game of the 2013 season against Derry he started every league game after that scoring against Cork City and Derry City. He also scored three goals over two legs to help Rovers into the Setanta Sports Cup semi-final. Lynch had two successful seasons with Sligo Rovers winning the 2012 League of Ireland and the 2013 FAI Cup. It was during his premier season with Sligo when Lynch made his debut in Europa Cup again Sparta Moskva, narrowly losing out over two legs home and away. In 2013 following their league winning season, Lynch featured again Europe, this time in the Champions League qualifier, where he featured against FC Molte from Norway

=== St Patrick's Athletic ===
It was announced by St Patrick's Athletic manager Liam Buckley at the Saint's Player of the Year Award Ceremony that Lee had signed with the 2013 League of Ireland Premier Division Champions for the upcoming 2014 season along with Ken Oman and Conor McCormack.

=== Limerick ===
Lynch moved to his hometown club Limerick, on the League of Ireland summer transfer deadline day, 31 July 2014.

=== Hamilton Academical ===
Lynch signed for Hamilton Academical on 3 January 2015 after the international transfer window opened. He was released by Hamilton in March 2015.

=== Return to Limerick ===
On 3 July 2015, Lynch signed for Limerick for a second time. Lynch played a pivotal part in helping to return Limerick to the League of Ireland Premier Division, scoring 10 goals from midfield and picking up fans' player of the year. Lynch was central in helping Limerick make it to the final of the EA sports cup. Despite scoring in the final to give his side a one nil lead at half time before St Patrick's Athletic ran out winners.

=== FC Arizona ===
In March 2018, Lynch signed for FC Arizona of the National Premier Soccer League in America.

=== Return to Sligo Rovers ===
In July 2018, Lynch re-signed for Sligo Rovers.

=== Larne ===
Lynch joined Larne in January 2019 and helped the club to the 2018–19 NIFL Championship title.

=== Coleraine ===
Lynch joined Coleraine in June 2022 for an undisclosed sum.

=== Treaty United ===
On 3 July 2024, Lynch returned to his hometown of Limerick, signing for League of Ireland First Division side Treaty United. His departure from the club was announced on 29 January 2026, having been announced as the Sporting Director of Limerick FC a month prior.

=== Limerick FC Sporting Director ===
Lynch was announced as the new Sporting Director of Limerick FC on 5 December 2025. Lynch departed the club in March 2026.

== International ==
Lynch has two underage caps for Ireland coming at under-17 level. He scored twice on his debut against Finland. He has also been called up to under-18 and under-19 squads.

== Personal life ==
He is the cousin of Jack Lynch who is also a professional footballer, having played for League of Ireland clubs Waterford, Cobh Ramblers, Galway United & Treaty United, where he was the club's first ever captain.

== Honours ==
Sligo Rovers

- League of Ireland Premier Division: 2012
- FAI Cup: 2013

St Patrick's Athletic

- FAI President's Cup: 2014

Limerick

- League of Ireland First Division: 2016

Larne

- NIFL Championship: 2018–19
- County Antrim Shield: 2020–21, 2021-22
