= 2014 League of Ireland Cup =

EA Sports Cup

Tournament details
- Country: Republic of Ireland; Northern Ireland
- Dates: 10 March – 20 September
- Teams: 24

Final positions
- Champions: Dundalk
- Runner-up: Shamrock Rovers

Tournament statistics
- Matches played: 23

The 2014 League of Ireland Cup, also known as the 2014 EA Sports Cup, was the 41st season of the Irish football knockout competition.

Dundalk defeated Shamrock Rovers 3–2 in the final on 20 September.

== First round ==
The draw for the First Round took place on 12 February 2014. The First Round games were played on the 10 March 2014.

10 March 2014	Cork City	4–0	Limerick	Turners Cross
19:45	Lehane 39', 80'; Dennehy 51' (pen.); O'Sullivan 83'	Report		Attendance: 1009; Referee: Jim McKell

10 March 2014	Waterford United	2–1	Avondale United	RSC
19:45	Barrett 11'; Corcoran 34'	Report	McCarthy 9'	Referee: Shane Dunphy

10 March 2014	Finn Harps	3–2	Cockhill Celtic	Finn Park
19:45	McCarron 2'; O'Donnell 14' (o.g.); Keating 73'	Report	McDermott 66'; O'Donnell 85'	Attendance: 250 (est); Referee: Paul Duddy

10 March 2014	Crumlin United	1–3 (a.e.t.)	Drogheda United	Pearse Park
19:45	Dempsey 40'	Report	O'Neill 89'; Doyle 117'; Andrews 118'	Referee: Ben Connolly

10 March 2014	Shelbourne	2–5 (a.e.t.)	Bray Wanderers	Tolka Park
20:00	Tinnelly 47', 67'	Report	Byrne 5', 9'; Kelly 93', 111', 120+1' (pen.)	Attendance: 256 est Referee: Tomas Connolly

10 March 2014	Athlone Town	0–1	Longford Town	Athlone Town Stadium
19:45		Report	Shaw 71'	Attendance: 320; Referee: Neil Doyle

10 March 2014	UCD	0–3	Bohemians	UCD Bowl
19:45		Report	Devaney 11'; Byrne 55'; Hyland 84'	Attendance: 145; Referee: Simon Rogers

10 March 2014	Galway	2–0	Mayo League	Eamonn Deacy Park
19:45	Owens 75'; Keegan 83'	Report		Referee: Rob Hennessey

== Second round ==
5 May 2014	Bray Wanderers	0–3	Dundalk	Carlisle Grounds, Bray
16:00		Report	McMillan 51', 77'; McDonald 58'	Referee: Rob Harvey

5 May 2014	Drogheda United	1–2	Shamrock Rovers	United Park, Drogheda
16:00	Foley 75' (pen.)	Report	Kilduff 2'; Kelly 64' (pen.)	Referee: Neil Doyle

5 May 2014	Cork City	2–0	Waterford United	Turners Cross, Turners Cross
17:00	Buckley 16', 18'	Report		Referee: Kevin O'Regan

5 May 2014	Sligo Rovers	0–1	Derry City	The Showgrounds, Sligo
17:00		Report	Patterson 14'	Referee: Padraigh Sutton

5 May 2014	Galway	1–0	Finn Harps	Eamonn Deacy Park, Galway
17:30	Faherty 9'	Report		Referee: Ray Matthews

5 May 2014	Wexford Youths	1–0	Cobh Ramblers	Ferrycarrig Park, Crossabeg
20:00	Skelly 51'	Report		Referee: Simon Rogers

6 May 2014	Bohemians	3–2	St Patrick's Athletic	Dalymount Park, Phibsborough
19:45	Hyland 7', 43'; Corcoran 82'	Report	Kavanagh 31'; Brennan 34' (pen.)	Referee: David McKeon

6 May 2014	Longford Town	2–0	Mervue United	Strokestown Road, Longford
19:45	Shaw 22', 27'	Report		Referee: Ben Connolly

== Quarter finals ==
27 May 2014	Derry City	1–2	Dundalk	Brandywell Stadium, Derry
19:45	McEleney 82'	Report	McMillan 26'; Byrne 75'	Referee: David McKeon

27 May 2014	Wexford Youths	1–1 (a.e.t.) (4–3 p)	Galway	Ferrycarrig Park, Crossabeg
20:00	Furlong 90+5'	Report	Shanahan 114'	Attendance: 120; Referee: Keith Callanan

26 May 2014	Longford Town	0–2	Bohemians	Strokestown Road, Longford
20:20		Report	Corcoran 42', 88'	Referee: Rob Rogers

21 July 2014	Shamrock Rovers	2–0	Cork City	Tallaght Stadium, Dublin
20:45	Finn 41'; Kilduff 90+3'	Report		Attendance: 622; Referee: Paul Tuite

== Semifinals ==
4 August 2014	Dundalk	5–0	Wexford Youths	Oriel Park, Dundalk
17:00	Griffin 24'; Ward 42'; McMillan 77', 90+3'; Mountney 79'	Report		Attendance: 1078; Referee: Rob Harvey

4 August 2014	Bohemians	0–2	Shamrock Rovers	Dalymount Park, Dublin
19:30		Report	Waters 8'; Kelly 54'	Referee: Rob Rogers

== Final ==
19 September 2014	Dundalk	3–2	Shamrock Rovers	Oriel Park, Dundalk
	Massey 4', 46'; Hoban 49'	Report	McGuinness 28'; Kilduff 76'	Referee: Graham Kelly
