= Mark Quigley =

Irish footballer (born 1985)

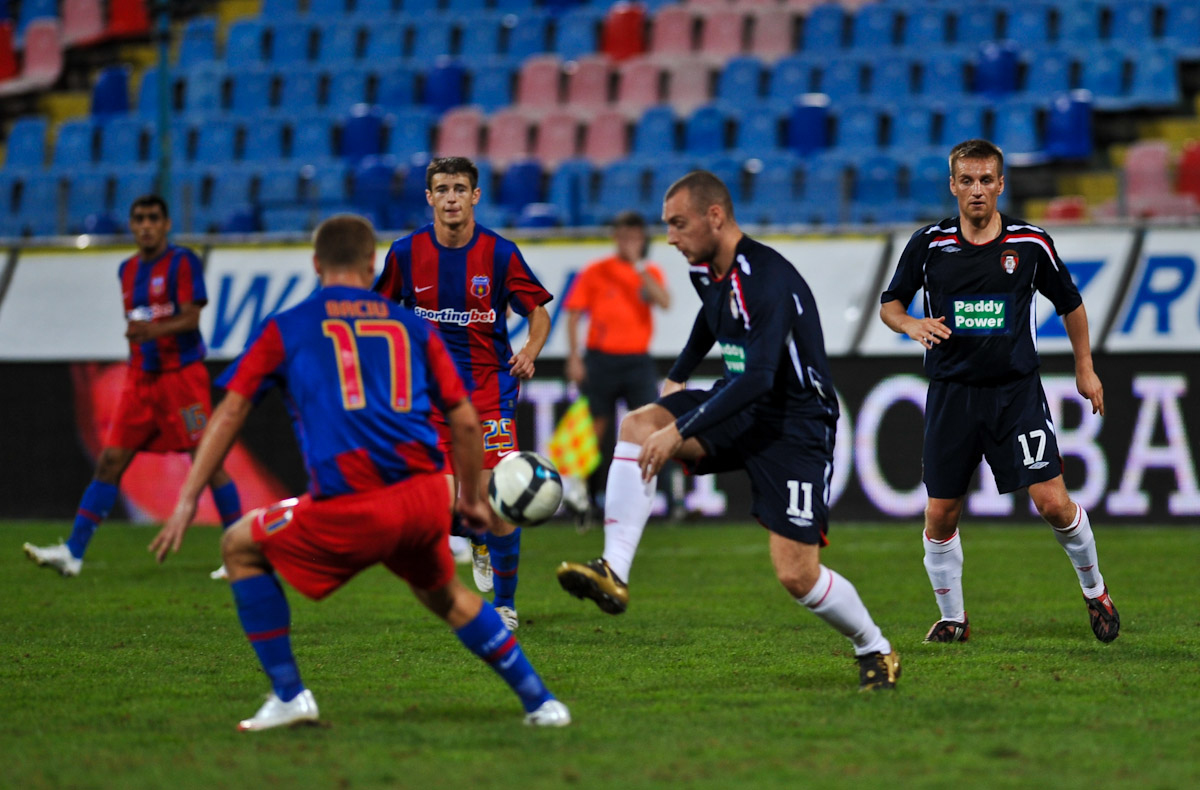
- Quigley in action against Steaua Bucharest in the UEFA Europa League in 2009

Personal information
- Date of birth: 27 October 1985 (age 41)
- Place of birth: Dublin, Ireland
- Position: Striker

Youth career
- –2003: Belvedere

Senior career*
Years	Team	Apps	(Gls)
2003–2005	Millwall	9	(0)
2005	→ Shamrock Rovers (loan)	10	(1)
2006–2009	St Patrick's Athletic	111	(36)
2010	Bohemians	34	(4)
2011	Dundalk	34	(13)
2012	Sligo Rovers	25	(10)
2013	Shamrock Rovers	13	(3)
2014	St Patrick's Athletic	12	(1)
2015	Derry City	9	(0)
2016	Bohemians	23	(2)

International career
2008	Republic of Ireland U23	1	(0)
2003–2004	Republic of Ireland U19	7	(2)
2005	Republic of Ireland U21	1	(0)
2008	Republic of Ireland U23	1	(0)
- * Club domestic league appearances and goals

Mark Quigley (born 27 October 1985) is an Irish former professional footballer who played for Millwall, Shamrock Rovers (over 2 spells), St Patrick's Athletic (over 2 spells), Bohemians (over 2 spells), Dundalk, Sligo Rovers and Derry City.

== Career ==
Quigley came to prominence as a schoolboy with noted Dublin club Belvedere from where he signed for Millwall in 2003. He made his Football League debut as a substitute against Stoke City on 19 February 2005. After a further 8 appearances he moved home on loan to Shamrock Rovers for the rest of the 2005 League of Ireland season making his League of Ireland debut on 19 August and he went on to make a total of 12 appearances under Roddy Collins.

Mark signed for St. Patrick's Athletic in 2006 and made a huge breakthrough during the 2007 season. He ended the campaign as second top scorer in the league and was voted PFAI Young Player of the Year. He was also called up to the Ireland Under 23 squad for the game against Northern Ireland and reportedly impressed the watching national coach Giovanni Trapattoni.

He scored three goals for St. Pat's during their 2008–09 UEFA Cup campaign, netting against JFK Olimps and home and away against IF Elfsborg.

After 148 appearances for St. Pats in all competitions, Quigley moved to Dalymount Park and Bohs' in time for the 2010 season.

Quigley made a slow start to his Bohs career and it was 8 May before he netted his first league for the club when scoring the winner against Sligo Rovers. Despite playing as a forward for most of his career, Pat Fenlon decided to use Mark as a winger and this played a part in a strike rate of only 4 goals in 34 league appearances for the Gypsies. When his contract expired at the end of the 2010 season, Quigley was released by Bohemians.

=== Dundalk ===
On 4 December 2010 he signed for Dundalk along with fellow Bohemians teammate Jason Byrne in a one-year deal.

=== Sligo Rovers ===
Quigley signed for Sligo Rovers on 14 December 2011, to fight for a place alongside Danny North. Quigley scored the winning goal from the penalty spot against his former club Saint Patrick's Athletic to clinch Sligo's first league title since 1977.

He won the PFAI Player of the Year for the 2012 League of Ireland season.

=== Return to Inchicore ===
In December 2013, he re-signed for St. Patrick's Athletic.

=== Derry City ===
After spending the first half of the 2015 League of Ireland season out injured, Quigley signed for Derry City on Monday 6 July 2015.

=== Return to Bohemians ===
After a short, unsuccessful spell at Derry City Quigley returned to Dublin and Bohemians in December 2015. He made his second debut for the club in the opening game of the 2016 season against Cork City. Quigley scored his first goals since his return to the club on 18 March, netting a brace against Wexford Youths.

=== Retirement ===
Quigley played for and later managed his local club Sheriff YC after finishing his professional career.

== Career statistics ==
As of 18 March 2026

Appearances and goals by club, season and competition
Club	Season	League			National cup (Note: Includes FAI Cup & FAI Cup)		League cup (Note: Includes EFL Cup & League of Ireland Cup)		Europe		Other		Total	
Club	Season	Division	Apps	Goals	Apps	Goals	Apps	Goals	Apps	Goals	Apps	Goals	Apps	Goals
Millwall	2003–04	EFL Championship	1	0	0	0	0	0	—		—		1	0
Millwall	2004–05	EFL Championship	8	0	0	0	0	0	0 (Note: Appearance(s) in the UEFA Cup)	0	—		8	0
Millwall	2005–06	EFL Championship	0	0	0	0	0	0	—		—		0	0
Millwall	Total		9	0	0	0	0	0	0	0	—		9	0
Shamrock Rovers (loan)	2005	LOI Premier Division	10	1	1	0	0	0	—		—		11	1
St Patrick's Athletic	2006	LOI Premier Division	24	3	4	1	2	0	—		—		30	4
St Patrick's Athletic	2007	LOI Premier Division	31	16	3	2	1	0	2	0	7 (Note: Appearance(s) in the Setanta Sports Cup)	1	44	19
St Patrick's Athletic	2008	LOI Premier Division	30	15	5	5	0	0	6	2	6	1	47	23
St Patrick's Athletic	2009	LOI Premier Division	25	4	3	0	1	0	2 (Note: Appearance(s) in the UEFA Europa League)	0	0	0	31	6
St Patrick's Athletic	Total		110	38	15	8	4	0	10	2	13	2	152	50
Bohemians	2010	LOI Premier Division	34	4	4	1	1	0	2 (Note: Appearance(s) in the UEFA Champions League)	0	5	0	46	5
Dundalk	2011	LOI Premier Division	34	13	5	3	1	0	—		8 (Note: 7 appearances, 5 goals in the Setanta Sports Cup;1 appearance in the Leinster Senior Cup)	5	48	21
Sligo Rovers	2012	LOI Premier Division	25	10	1	1	1	0	1	0	4	2	33	13
Shamrock Rovers	2013	LOI Premier Division	13	3	2	1	1	1	—		5 (Note: 2 appearances in the Setanta Sports Cup; 3 appearances, 1 goal in the Leinster Senior Cup)	1	21	6
St Patrick's Athletic	2014	LOI Premier Division	19	1	3	0	0	0	2	0	7 (Note: 3 appearances, 2 goals in the Setanta Sports Cup; 3 appearances in the Leinster Senior Cup; 1 appearance in the President of Ireland's Cup)	2	31	3
Derry City	2015	LOI Premier Division	13	0	2	0	—		—		—		15	0
Bohemians	2016	LOI Premier Division	26	3	2	1	1	0	—		2	0	31	4
Career total			293	73	35	15	9	1	15	2	44	12	396	103

== Honours ==
=== Club ===
Bohemians

- Setanta Sports Cup (1): 2009–10

Sligo Rovers

- League of Ireland Premier Division (1): 2012

Shamrock Rovers

- Setanta Sports Cup (1): 2013
- League of Ireland Cup (1): 2013
- Leinster Senior Cup (1): 2013

St Patrick's Athletic

- FAI Cup (1): 2014
- President of Ireland's Cup (1): 2014
- Leisnter Senior Cup (1): 2014

=== Individual ===
- PFAI Young Player of the Year (1): 2007
- PFAI Players' Player of the Year (1):2012
