= 2014 President of Ireland's Cup =

- Event: President's Cup
St Patrick's Athletic	Sligo Rovers
1	0
- Date: 2 March 2014
- Venue: Richmond Park, Dublin
- Referee: Paul McLaughlin
- Attendance: 1,330

The 2014 President's Cup was the inaugural President's Cup. The match was played between 2013 League of Ireland Premier Division champions, St Patrick's Athletic, and 2013 FAI Cup Final winners Sligo Rovers at Richmond Park on 2 March 2014. The match finished 1–0 to St Patrick's Athletic, with Keith Fahey scoring with a right-footed volley top the top right corner from 25 yards after 18 minutes.

== Match ==
2 March 2014
16:00 GMT

St Patrick's Athletic	1–0	Sligo Rovers
Fahey 18'	Report

Richmond Park
Attendance: 1,330
Referee: Paul McLaughlin

St Patrick's Athletic	Sligo Rovers

GK	1	(Republic of Ireland) Brendan Clarke
DF	2	(Republic of Ireland) Ger O'Brien (c)
DF	15	(Republic of Ireland) Kenny Browne
DF	5	(Republic of Ireland) Ken Oman	(yellow card) 75'
DF	3	(Republic of Ireland) Ian Bermingham
MF	8	(Republic of Ireland) Keith Fahey		(substituted off) 87'
MF	6	(Republic of Ireland) Greg Bolger
MF	7	(Republic of Ireland) Conan Byrne
MF	11	(Republic of Ireland) Killian Brennan	(yellow card) 59'
MF	17	(Republic of Ireland) Chris Forrester		(substituted off) 72'
FW	9	(Republic of Ireland) Christy Fagan		(substituted off) 87'
Substitutes:
GK	16	(Republic of Ireland) Rene Gilmartin
DF	4	(Republic of Ireland) Derek Foran
MF	14	(Republic of Ireland) James Chambers
MF	18	(Republic of Ireland) Lee Lynch		(substituted in) 87'
MF	10	(Republic of Ireland) Mark Quigley		(substituted in) 87'
MF	22	(Republic of Ireland) Conor McCormack
FW	21	(Republic of Ireland) Daryl Kavanagh		(substituted in) 72'
Manager:
(Republic of Ireland) Liam Buckley

GK	12	(England) Richard Brush
DF	2	(Republic of Ireland) Alan Keane (c)
DF	5	(Republic of Ireland) Evan McMillan
DF	6	(England) Jeff Henderson
DF	3	(Republic of Ireland) Danny Ledwith
MF	8	(Republic of Ireland) David Cawley	(substituted off) 80'
MF	15	(Cameroon) Joseph N'Do	(substituted off) 61'
MF	22	(England) Eric Odhiambo
MF	18	(Republic of Ireland) John Russell	(substituted off) 61'
FW	20	(Republic of Ireland) Aaron Greene
FW	7	(England) Danny North
Substitutes:
GK	1	(Republic of Ireland) Gary Rogers
DF	29	(Republic of Ireland) Seamus Conneely	(substituted in) 80'
DF	16	(Republic of Ireland) Kalen Spillane
DF	24	(Republic of Ireland) Jake Dykes
MF	14	(Republic of Ireland) Paul O'Conor	(substituted in) 61'
FW	10	(Republic of Ireland) Raffaele Cretaro	(substituted in) 61'
Manager:
(England) Ian Baraclough

== See also ==
- 2014 FAI Cup
- 2014 League of Ireland
