= Conor McCormack (footballer) =

Irish footballer

Personal information
- Date of birth: 18 May 1990 (age 36)
- Place of birth: Carlingford, County Louth, Ireland
- Positions: Midfielder; right back

Youth career
- 2006–2008: Manchester United
- 2008–2011: Triestina

Senior career*
Years	Team	Apps	(Gls)
2011–2013	Shamrock Rovers	54	(0)
2014–2015	St Patrick's Athletic	40	(0)
2015–2016	Derry City	40	(1)
2017–2019	Cork City	91	(3)
2020	Derry City	17	(1)
2021–2026	Galway United	139	(2)
Total		381	(7)

International career
2007–2008	Republic of Ireland U17	5	(0)
2008	Republic of Ireland U19	2	(0)
- * Club domestic league appearances and goals

Conor McCormack (born 18 May 1990) is an Irish former professional footballer and coach. During his career he played for Shamrock Rovers, St Patrick's Athletic, Derry City, Cork City and Galway United.

== Club career ==
He started his career with Manchester United, joining on a youth contract when he was 16 years old. After spending two years at the club and becoming disillusioned with the lack of first-team opportunities, McCormack turned down the offer of an extension to his contract. He moved to Italy and joined Serie B side U.S. Triestina Calcio. McCormack did not make a first-team start during his two and a half years there. After a proposed loan deal to a Lega Pro side fell through at the last minute in May 2010, McCormack made his intentions to leave clear. He returned to Ireland to sign for League of Ireland champions Shamrock Rovers at the beginning of the 2011 season, playing a role in their journey to the Europa League group stages.

In 2012, McCormack signed for a further 2 seasons.

McCormack signed for League of Ireland champions, St Patrick's Athletic for the 2014 season in November 2013. He scored his first goal for Pats on his debut in a 4–1 win over Shelbourne in a friendly at Pearse Park on 1 February 2014. After 58 appearances for Pats, McCormack was released by mutual consent on 28 July 2015 and was announced as a new signing for relegation fighting Derry City later that day.

He signed with Cork City on 18 November 2016 by manager John Caulfield. Cork City had recently won the Irish Daily Mail FAI Cup and McCormack played a role in Cork's League of Ireland title win ahead of Dundalk the following season.

He spent the 2020 season back with his former side Derry City, where he was named club captain.

McCormack signed for Galway United ahead of the 2021 season. On 11 July 2026, McCormack played his last game in professional football in a 3–2 over Sligo Rovers in the Connacht derby at Pearse Stadium.

== International career ==
McCormack has previously captained the Republic of Ireland Youths team and has caps from Under 15, Under 16, Under 17 and Under 19 levels. He was the recipient of the Republic of Ireland Under-17 Player of the Year award for 2007.

In the 2007 UEFA European Under-17 Championship elite round McCormack played against a Germany U17 side featuring Toni Kroos.

== Coaching career ==
In May 2026, McCormack was announced by the Football Association of Ireland as one of their full-time coaches in the underage international setup, working with all of the association's age groups between Under–15 and Under–19 level.

== Honours ==
Cork City

- League of Ireland Premier Division (1): 2017
- FAI Cup (1): 2017
- President's Cup (2): 2017, 2018
- Munster Senior Cup (1): 2017

Shamrock Rovers

- League of Ireland Premier Division (1): 2011
- League of Ireland Cup (1): 2013
- Setanta Sports Cup (2): 2011, 2013
- Leinster Senior Cup (2): 2012, 2013

St Patrick's Athletic

- FAI Cup (1): 2014
- FAI President's Cup (1): 2014
- Leinster Senior Cup (1): 2014

Galway United

- League of Ireland First Division (1): 2023

== Career statistics ==
As of match played on 11 July 2026

Club	Division	Season	League		National Cup		League Cup		Europe		Other		Total	
Club	Division	Season	Apps	Goals	Apps	Goals	Apps	Goals	Apps	Goals	Apps	Goals	Apps	Goals
Shamrock Rovers	LOI Premier Division	2011	21	0	2	0	1	0	8 (Note: 4 appearances in UEFA Champions League, 4 appearances in UEFA Europa League)	0	6 (Note: 5 appearances in Setanta Sports Cup, 1 appearance in Leinster Senior Cup)	0	38	0
Shamrock Rovers	LOI Premier Division	2012	14	0	2	0	3	0	0 (Note: Appearances in UEFA Champions League)	0	5 (Note: 3 appearances in Setanta Sports Cup, 2 appearances in Leinster Senior Cup)	0	24	0
Shamrock Rovers	LOI Premier Division	2013	19	0	4	0	3	0	–		4 (Note: 1 appearances in Setanta Sports Cup, 3 appearances in Leinster Senior Cup)	0	30	0
Shamrock Rovers	Total		54	0	8	0	7	0	8	0	15	0	92	0
St Patrick's Athletic	LOI Premier Division	2014	25	0	5	0	1	0	0	0	7 (Note: 3 appearances in Setanta Sports Cup, 4 appearances in Leinster Senior Cup)	0	38	0
St Patrick's Athletic	LOI Premier Division	2015	15	0	1	0	2	0	0 (Note: Appearances in UEFA Europa League)	0	2 (Note: 1 appearance in Leinster Senior Cup, 1 appearance in President's Cup)	0	20	0
St Patrick's Athletic	Total		40	0	6	0	3	0	0	0	9	0	58	0
Derry City	LOI Premier Division	2015	9	0	–		–		–		–		9	0
Derry City	LOI Premier Division	2016	31	1	5	0	3	0	–		–		39	1
Derry City	Total		40	1	5	0	3	0	–		–		48	1
Cork City	LOI Premier Division	2017	28	2	4	0	0	0	4	0	3 (Note: 2 appearances in Munster Senior Cup, 1 appearance in President's Cup)	0	39	2
Cork City	LOI Premier Division	2018	32	0	2	0	0	0	4 (Note: 2 appearances in UEFA Champions League & 2 appearances in the UEFA Europa League)	0	1 (Note: Appearance in President's Cup)	0	39	0
Cork City	LOI Premier Division	2019	31	1	1	0	0	0	2	0	3 (Note: 2 appearances in the Munster Senior Cup & 1 appearance in the President's Cup)	0	37	1
Cork City	Total		91	3	7	0	0	0	10	0	7	0	115	3
Derry City	LOI Premier Division	2020	17	1	2	0	–		1	0	–		20	1
Galway United	LOI First Division	2021	24	0	0	0	–		–		2 (Note: Appearances in 2021 League of Ireland promotion/relegation playoffs)	0	26	0
Galway United	LOI First Division	2022	27	0	2	0	–		–		3 (Note: Appearances in 2022 League of Ireland promotion/relegation playoffs)	0	32	0
Galway United	LOI First Division	2023	31	1	2	0	–		–		–		33	1
Galway United	LOI Premier Division	2024	33	0	2	0	–		–		–		35	0
Galway United	LOI Premier Division	2025	11	1	1	0	–		–		–		12	1
Galway United	LOI Premier Division	2026	13	0	−		−		−		−		13	0
Galway United	Total		149	2	7	0	–		–		5	0	151	2
Career Total			421	7	35	0	13	0	19	0	36	0	462	7
