= Rene Gilmartin =

Irish footballer (born 1987)

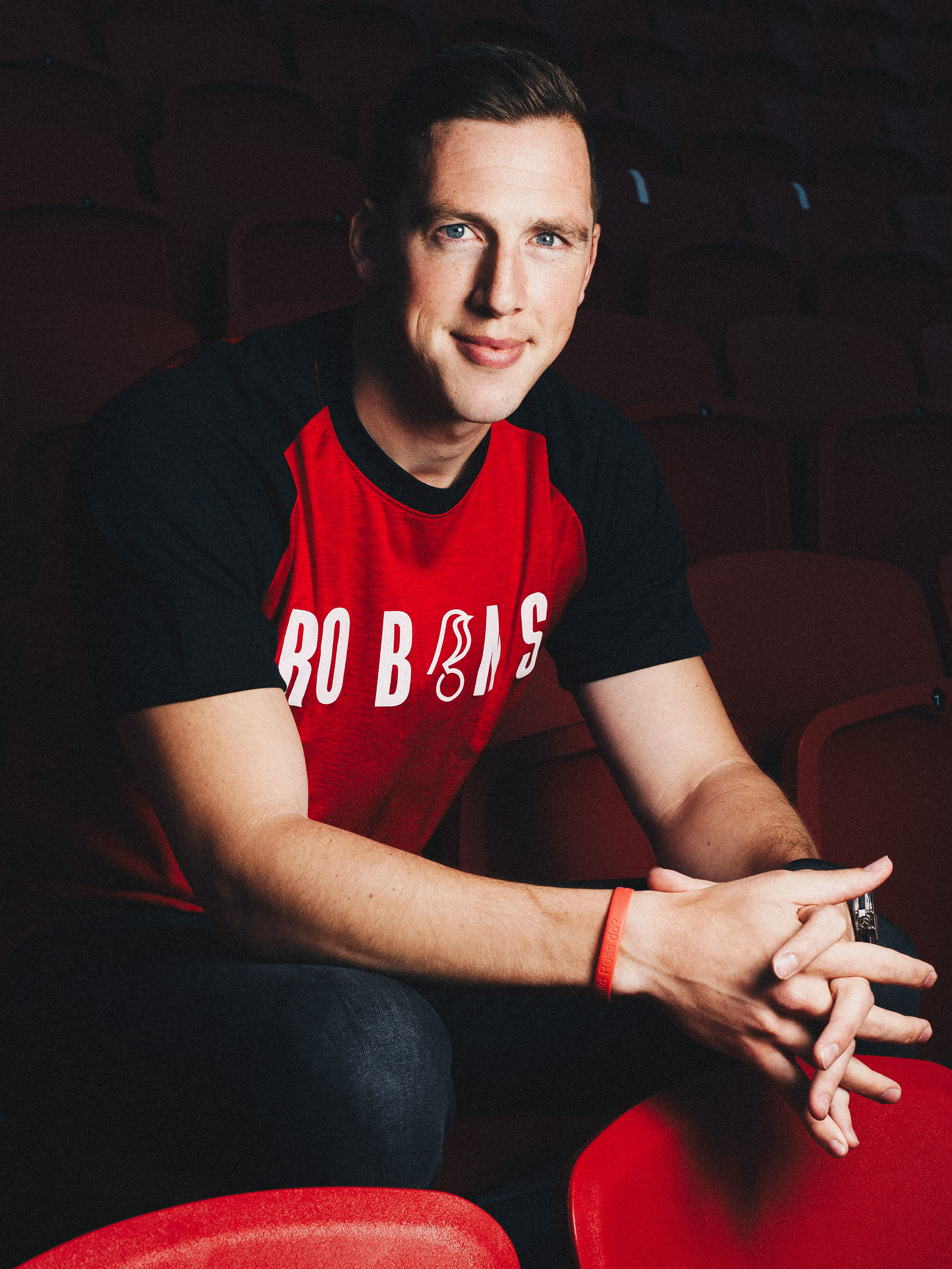
- Gilmartin after signing for Bristol City in 2019

Personal information
- Full name: Rene Patrick Gilmartin
- Date of birth: 31 May 1987 (age 39)
- Place of birth: Dublin, Ireland
- Height: 1.96 m (6 ft 5 in)
- Position: Goalkeeper

Team information
- Current team: Ipswich Town (goalkeeping coach)

Youth career
- –2005: St Kevin's Boys
- Malahide United

Senior career*
Years	Team	Apps	(Gls)
2005–2010	Walsall	35	(0)
2007	→ Worcester City (loan)	0	(0)
2007	→ Hednesford Town (loan)	1	(0)
2010–2012	Watford	2	(0)
2011–2012	→ Yeovil Town (loan)	8	(0)
2012	→ Crawley Town (loan)	6	(0)
2012–2013	Plymouth Argyle	13	(0)
2013–2014	St Patrick's Athletic	1	(0)
2014–2017	Watford	0	(0)
2017–2019	Colchester United	22	(0)
2019–2021	Bristol City	0	(0)
Total		88	(0)

International career
2006	Republic of Ireland U19		
2006–2007	Republic of Ireland U21	1	(0)

Managerial career
- 2019–: Republic of Ireland U21 (goalkeeping coach)
- 2021: Swindon Town (assistant manager)
- 2021–: Ipswich Town (goalkeeping coach)
- 2024: Republic of Ireland (interim goalkeeping coach)
- * Club domestic league appearances and goals

Rene Patrick Gilmartin (born 31 May 1987) is an Irish professional football coach and former professional footballer who is the goalkeeping coach at Ipswich Town.

He has previously appeared in the Football League for Walsall, Watford, Yeovil Town, Crawley Town, Plymouth Argyle and Colchester United, and has also played for League of Ireland side St Patrick's Athletic. Gilmartin has played international football for the Republic of Ireland at under-19 and under-21 levels.

== Career ==
Rene Gilmartin is a native of Malahide. Having previously played for Malahide United F.C. and then St. Kevin's Boys F.C., Gilmartin joined English League One side Walsall in the summer of 2005. He made his Walsall debut on 17 September 2005 in a 3–2 home defeat to Chesterfield, and played two further first-team matches that season. He also made his international debut for Republic of Ireland under-19s in February 2006. At the end of the 2005–06 season, Gilmartin's contract was extended, with Walsall taking up one-year option. After signing, Gilmartin said he expected to fight for the first choice goalkeeper ahead of a new season.

Gilmartin did not feature for Walsall over the next two seasons, but played for Republic of Ireland under-21s in 2007, and completed his UEFA B coaching licence in April 2008. During 2007, he joined Worcester City and Hednesford Town, in order to gain first team experience. In May 2008 Gilmartin signed another new 12-month contract. During the 2008–09 season, in which he made 12 appearances, Gilmartin said he would consider leaving the club if first choice goalkeeper Clayton Ince stayed on. Ultimately, he signed another new 12-month contract at the end of the season.

In the 2009–10 season, Gilmartin replaced Ince as a first choice goalkeeper. He credited the club's goalkeeping coach, Mick Kearns, for helping him improve as a player. In October 2009, he suffered a hamstring injury that would keep him out for three to four weeks. Despite the injury, Gilmartin played 24 times in 2009–10 season.

Gilmartin was offered a new contract by Walsall on 10 May 2010, but joined Championship side Watford on 1 July 2010. He made his debut in a League Cup first round tie away to Aldershot Town, keeping a clean sheet in a 3–0 Watford win. Gilmartin struggled to displace Scott Loach as Watford's goalkeeper during the 2010–11 season, but did play in all four of the club's cup games. He also won the club's community ambassador prize at the end of season awards.

Gilmartin displaced Loach to make his full league debut on 27 September 2011, in a 2–1 home victory over Millwall. He started the following game, a 3–0 defeat at Southampton, before Loach returned to the side. On 23 November 2011, Gilmartin was sent out on loan to League One side Yeovil Town until 3 January 2012. He returned to Watford on 19 January 2012, having made eight appearances for Yeovil. In February 2012 he joined League Two side Crawley Town on loan as back up to Michael Kuipers, following an injury to Scott Shearer. On 3 May 2012, Gilmartin was one of four players to be released by Watford after their contracts expired.

Gilmartin signed a two-year contract with League Two side Plymouth Argyle in July 2012, and made 16 appearances in all competitions. He was transfer-listed by manager John Sheridan at the end of the 2012–13 season, and left the club by mutual consent in June 2013.

Gilmartin returned to Dublin in July, having signed an 18-month contract with League of Ireland side St Patrick's Athletic. He made his Pats' debut later that month in a Dublin derby at Shamrock Rovers in the League of Ireland Cup. He made his league debut the following season, on 2 June 2014 against Drogheda United, when he came on as a half-time substitute for the injured Brendan Clarke. He continued Clarke's work and kept a clean sheet as Pats won 6–0. In total, he made 10 appearances for the Saints, with nine coming in cup competitions.

Gilmartin returned to English football by re-signing with Watford on a one-year deal on 25 August 2014 as a back-up to Heurelho Gomes and Jonathan Bond, two years after he first left the club. He signed a new two-year contract in June 2015 as the club approached their first season back in the Premier League. Alongside his playing career with Watford he commentates on the club's away games for BBC Three Counties Radio, is taking further coaching qualifications and has taken training sessions for the club's academy. He left Watford at the end of the 2016–17 season.

Following his release from Watford, Gilmartin signed for League Two club Colchester United as a player-coach. He made his debut for Colchester in the EFL Trophy against Reading U23 on 29 August.

Gilmartin rejected the offer of a new contract in July 2019 and signed for Championship club Bristol City as a player with some Junior Coaching responsibilities.

== Coaching career ==
Gilmartin began his coaching career whilst still a player at Bristol City, coaching the club's under-23 side. On 7 November 2019, it was announced that Gilmartin had taken up a role as goalkeeping coach for the Republic of Ireland under-21s under their new manager Stephen Kenny. On 1 June 2021, Gilmartin was appointed assistant manager of Swindon Town.

When John McGreal was named interim manager of Ipswich Town in December 2021, Gilmartin joined his coaching team as an interim coach, having previously been McGreal's assistant manager at Swindon. Later that month, following the appointment of Kieran McKenna, Gilmartin was named first-team goalkeeping coach at Ipswich.

== Career statistics ==
Appearances and goals by club, season and competition
Club	Season	League			National Cup		League Cup		Other		Total	
Club	Season	Division	Apps	Goals	Apps	Goals	Apps	Goals	Apps	Goals	Apps	Goals
Walsall	2005–06	League One	2	0	1	0	0	0	0	0	3	0
Walsall	2006–07	League Two	0	0	0	0	0	0	0	0	0	0
Walsall	2007–08	League One	0	0	0	0	0	0	0	0	0	0
Walsall	2008–09	League One	11	0	0	0	0	0	1 (Note: Appearance(s) in Football League Trophy)	0	12	0
Walsall	2009–10	League One	22	0	0	0	1	0	1	0	24	0
Walsall	Total		35	0	1	0	1	0	2	0	39	0
Watford	2010–11	Championship	0	0	2	0	2	0	—		4	0
Watford	2011–12	Championship	2	0	0	0	1	0	—		3	0
Watford	Total		2	0	2	0	3	0	—		7	0
Yeovil Town (loan)	2011–12	League One	8	0	—		—		—		8	0
Crawley Town (loan)	2011–12	League Two	6	0	1	0	—		—		7	0
Plymouth Argyle	2012–13	League One	13	0	1	0	0	0	2	0	16	0
St Patrick's Athletic	2013	Premier Division	0	0	0	0	1	0	2 (Note: Appearances in Leinster Senior Cup)	0	3	0
St Patrick's Athletic	2014	Premier Division	1	0	1	0	1	0	4 (Note: Three appearances in Setanta Sports Cup, one appearance in Leinster Senior Cup)	0	7	0
St Patrick's Athletic	Total		1	0	1	0	2	0	6	0	10	0
Watford	2014–15	Championship	0	0	0	0	0	0	—		0	0
Watford	2015–16	Premier League	0	0	0	0	0	0	—		0	0
Watford	2016–17	Premier League	0	0	0	0	0	0	—		0	0
Watford	Total		0	0	0	0	0	0	—		0	0
Colchester United	2017–18	League Two	0	0	0	0	0	0	2 (Note: Appearance(s) in EFL Trophy)	0	2	0
Colchester United	2018–19	League Two	22	0	1	0	0	0	1	0	24	0
Colchester United	Total		22	0	1	0	0	0	3	0	26	0
Bristol City	2019–20	Championship	0	0	0	0	0	0	—		0	0
Bristol City	2020–21	Championship	0	0	0	0	0	0	—		0	0
Bristol City	Total		0	0	0	0	0	0	0	0	0	0
Career total			87	0	7	0	6	0	13	0	113	0

== Personal life ==
Gilmartin married his wife Emma Nugent in the summer of 2015.
