= Ken Oman =

Irish footballer (born 1982)

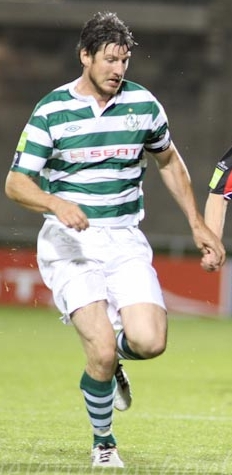

Personal information
- Date of birth: 29 July 1982 (age 44)
- Place of birth: Dublin, Ireland
- Position: Centre back

Youth career
- Rivermount F.C.

Senior career*
Years	Team	Apps	(Gls)
2001–2005	Bohemians	69	(3)
2006–2007	Derry City	17	(2)
2008–2010	Bohemians	69	(7)
2011–2013	Shamrock Rovers	81	(6)
2014	St Patrick's Athletic	6	(0)
2015–2017	Portadown	56	(5)

International career
2002–2003	Republic of Ireland U21	4	(0)
2010	League of Ireland XI	1	(0)
- * Club domestic league appearances and goals

Kenneth Oman (born 29 July 1982) is an Irish retired footballer who played as a defender.

== Career ==
Oman began his league career at Bohemians when Pete Mahon signed him in the summer of 2001. He made his League of Ireland debut as a substitute in a 5–1 win away to Galway United on 31 August 2001.

The defender was released by Bohemians in the close season between the 2005 and 2006 seasons and was immediately signed by former mentor Stephen Kenny. Oman relocated to Derry in an attempt to secure regular first team football.

He had an impressive competitive debut for the club against Linfield in the 2006 Setanta Cup and also played in Derry City's 2006–07 UEFA Cup games against high quality European opposition.

With the appointment of Pat Fenlon as his team's manager for the 2007 season, Oman was paired with Darren Kelly as Derry City's first choice partnership in central defence. As a result of his performances in the 2007 season, Oman received an unofficial Player of the Season Award from one of Derry City's supporters clubs. On 22 November, Oman was re-signed by Bohemians after he expressed his desire to return home to Dublin.

He struggled to find form on his return to Bohemians and despite winning a League of Ireland winners medal, he found it difficult to displace the central defensive pairing of Jason McGuinness and Liam Burns. He started the 2009 season on the bench but eventually found a first team place as a result of McGuinness being suspended. He scored some important goals during the season, including two against St. Patrick's Athletic on 11 August. He finished the season with two more winners medals as Bohemians reclaimed the league title and defeated Waterford United in the final of the League of Ireland Cup. He was voted onto the PFAI team of the year for 2009.

The following year was an unsuccessful one for Oman and Bohemians. The team lost the league title on goal difference and failed to make an impact in European competition. Bohemians and Oman parted ways after the 2010 season came to an end.

On 10 February 2011, Oman joined Shamrock Rovers. He made his League debut for the Hoops in the opening night win over Dundalk

He went on to make 20 league appearances as Rovers claimed the 2011 League title. He also took part in the club's epic 2011–12 UEFA Europa League campaign, playing in 6 of the club's 12 games and scoring in the 4–1 away defeat to FC Rubin Kazan.

Ken re-signed for the Hoops in 2012 and played in 19 league games, scoring three times, as Shamrock Rovers finished fourth in the league. The club also reached the EA Sports Cup Final where they lost out to Drogheda United. In 2013 Ken made 18 league appearances as the Hoops finished a disappointing fifth in the league. He missed out on the club's Setanta Cup Final win in May but did play in the EA Cup Final win against Drogheda United on 21 September.

Ken was released by Shamrock Rovers at the end of the 2013 season and signed for St Patrick's Athletic in November 2013. He made nine appearances for the Inchicore side, picking up two red cards in the process, as St Pats claimed third place in the 2014 league table. He was also an unused sub for the FAI Cup Final, which St Pats won after beating Derry City 2–0.

In February 2015, free agent Oman joined NIFL Premiership side Portadown on an 18-Month contract.

== Personal life ==
In March 2024, Oman received a suspended prison sentence after pleading guilty to a charge of unlawfully and maliciously inflicting grievous bodily harm. Oman was extradited to Northern Ireland over the charges, however it was later reported that he voluntarily surrendered himself to the authorities. Oman admitted elbowing opponent Caoimhin Bonner in the mouth while playing for Portadown against Cliftonville in 2016. At the time of his conviction, Oman was working as a taxi driver in Dublin.

== Honours ==
- League of Ireland: 3
  - Bohemians – 2008, 2009
  - Shamrock Rovers – 2011
- FAI Cup: 3
  - Derry City – 2006
  - Bohemians – 2008
  - St Patrick's Athletic – 2014
- League of Ireland Cup: 3
  - Derry City – 2006, 2007
  - Bohemians – 2009
- FAI President's Cup: 1
  - St Patrick's Athletic – 2014
- Setanta Sports Cup: 3
  - Bohemians – 2009–10
  - Shamrock Rovers – 2011, 2013
- Leinster Senior Cup: 2
  - Shamrock Rovers – 2012, 2013
