= Daryl Kavanagh =

Irish footballer

Personal information
- Full name: Daryl Kavanagh
- Date of birth: 11 August 1986 (age 40)
- Place of birth: Carrick on Suir, Ireland
- Height: 1.73 m (5 ft 8 in)
- Position: Forward

Team information
- Current team: Lansdowne Yonkers

Youth career
- Carrick United

Senior career*
Years	Team	Apps	(Gls)
2005–2007	Waterford United	?	(3)
2008	Carrick United	40	(32)
2008	Cobh Ramblers	12	(2)
2009	Carrick United	14	(9)
2009–2010	Limerick	25	(6)
2010	Waterford United	4	(0)
2011	St Patrick's Athletic	32	(7)
2012	Shamrock Rovers	25	(3)
2013	Cork City	19	(2)
2013–2014	St Patrick's Athletic	21	(2)
2014	Sligo Rovers	2	(0)
2015	Carrick United	0	(0)
2015	Drogheda United	12	(3)
2016–	Lansdowne Yonkers		
- * Club domestic league appearances and goals as of 02:38, 28 December 2023 (UTC)

Daryl "Dil" Kavanagh (born 11 August 1986) is an Irish footballer who last played for Drogheda United in the League of Ireland Premier Division. His former clubs include Carrick United (3 spells), Waterford United (2 spells), Cobh Ramblers, Limerick, St Patrick's Athletic (2 spells), Shamrock Rovers, Cork City and Sligo Rovers.

== Career ==
=== Carrick United ===
Kavanagh was part of the extremely successful Carrick United team which reached the Munster and FAI Junior Cup final as well as the Munster Senior Cup Finals.

=== Waterford United ===
He signed for Waterford United from the successful Carrick United junior side. After a "bedding-in" season he established himself in the Blues first team with a series of skilful displays from midfield. A serious leg injury curtailed his development, but he returned to Premier Division action with Cobh Ramblers in July 2008.

He signed again for Waterford United in July 2010 from Limerick F.C. but his contract with the Waterford United was terminated towards the end of the 2010 season for his off the field activities and addictions. Kavanagh attended a 28-day rehab for drink and drug addictions in 2010.

=== FIFPro ===
He was part of the 18-man squad for the FIFPro Winter Tournament 2011 in Oslo, Norway in January 2011. Kavanagh was named the best player of the tournament.

=== St Patrick's Athletic ===
He signed for St Patrick's Athletic in January 2011 after performing well at the FIFPro Winter tournament, taking the number 7 shirt previously worn by David McAllister, who left the Saints in the same month to join Sheffield United. Kavanagh scored his first goal for the Saints in a 2–0 win over Bray Wanderers at the Carlisle Grounds in the Leinster Senior Cup on 14 March 2011. Kavanagh scored his first league goals for Pats' against Drogheda, scoring two fine goals on Friday 29 April 2011. Kavanagh followed up on his first league goals by scoring against Galway United on the following Monday. Kavanagh scored the winning goal in the 1–0 win over Dublin rivals Bohemians. He scored a week later against University College Dublin A.F.C.

=== Shamrock Rovers ===
In January 2012 Kavanagh signed for League of Ireland Champions Shamrock Rovers. Kavanagh won his second Leinster Senior Cup with Rovers and left at the end of the season.

=== Cork City ===
Kavanagh signed for Cork City on a two-year deal in November 2012. His contract was terminated by mutual consent on 31 July 2013, after he had an argument with manager Tommy Dunne.

=== Return to St Patrick's Athletic ===
Kavanagh signed a contract with his old club, league leaders St Patrick's Athletic until the end of the season on the League of Ireland Summer Transfer Deadline Day, 31 July 2013. He made his return on 2 August in a 0–0 draw against Drogheda United at Richmond Park. Kavanagh's first goal since his return came against Bohemians at Richmond Park on 30 August. He scored the vital second goal in a 2–0 win over Dundalk in a huge match in the 2013 League of Ireland title run in. Kavanagh won his first League of Ireland title as Pats beat Sligo Rovers 2–0 on 13 October 2013 to win the league.

=== Sligo Rovers ===
After making just 1 league start for Pats in the 2014 season, scoring no league goals, Kavanagh left in search of first team football and joined Sligo Rovers on the League of Ireland Transfer Deadline Day, 31 July 2014. Kavanagh made his debut for Sligo against Athlone Town and made one other appearance against Bray Wanderers, in which he sustained a calf injury that would end his season. This injury resulted in Kavanagh being released by mutual agreement just over a month after signing for Sligo, after the club agreed to his request in order to facilitate his rehab on the injury closer to his home in Tipperary.

== Personal life ==
=== Addiction ===
Kavanagh has admitted being addicted to drugs, alcohol and gambling. He sought help for these problems and attended rehab for 28 days in 2010.

=== Prison ===
Kavanagh spent 6 days in prison on remand for attempted robbery with a fake gun.

=== Rehabilitation ===
Kavanagh claims to be rehabilitated and said in an Irish Times interview that he "had a few problems over the years with drinking and drugs and trouble-wise," he continued to say "there were thefts, attempted thefts, attempted robberies and stuff. I had drunk and disorderlies against me as well." Kavanagh has said "It's a life I want to leave behind me."

== Honours ==
=== Club ===
St Patrick's Athletic

- League of Ireland Premier Division (1): 2013
- Leinster Senior Cup (1): 2011
- President of Ireland's Cup (1): 2014

Shamrock Rovers

- Leinster Senior Cup (1): 2012

=== Individual ===
- PFAI Team of the Year (1): 2011
