= 2013–14 Leinster Senior Cup =

Leinster Football Association Senior Cup

Tournament details
- Country: Ireland
- Teams: 31

Final positions
- Champions: St Patrick's Athletic (8th title)
- Runner-up: Longford Town

Tournament statistics
- Matches played: 30

The 2013–14 Leinster Senior Cup, was the 113th staging of the Leinster Senior Cup association football competition.

31 teams entered the 2013–14 competition including the 11 Leinster based League of Ireland teams who entered the competition at the Fourth round stage. A further 5 Intermediate teams and 15 Junior teams entered the competition at the First, Second and Third Round stage.

Shamrock Rovers were the defending champions. The previous season's runners up, St Patrick's Athletic won the tournament in 2014, beating Longford Town 2–1 in the final at City Calling Stadium on 9 September 2014.

== First round ==
14 Junior clubs were entered into this round by a draw. Byes were given to 6 of these clubs. Winners progress to the Second Round.

14 August 2013	New Oak Boys	3 – 3 (a.e.t.) (2 – 4 p)	Shamrock Rovers (Wexford)

17 August 2013	Galty Celtic	1 – 4	Willow Park

18 August 2013	Rathnew	2 – 3	Evergreen

21 August 2013	Terenure	2 – 1	St. Kevin's Boys	VEC Terenure

== Second round ==
The 6 Junior clubs who received byes in Round One play against the 4 Round One winners.

13 September 2013	Rock Celtic	2 – 2	Shamrock Rovers (Wexford)	Sandy Lane, Dundalk
				Referee: Joe Dyas

- Abandoned after 79:43 minutes due to floodlight failure.

21 September 2013 Replay	Shamrock Rovers (Wexford)	1 – 0	Rock Celtic	Fr. Murphy Park, Enniscorthy

14 September 2013	Willow Park	7 – 0	Kilmore Celtic

15 September 2013	Swords Celtic	3 – 0	Naas United	Balheary, Swords

15 September 2013	Evergreen	1 – 2	Sheriff Y.C.	Kells Road

21 September 2013	Terenure	4 – 6 (a.e.t.)	Kilbarrack United
		Report

== Third round ==
5 Intermediate clubs entered in this round in an open draw along with the 5 Second Round winners.

22 October 2013	Glebe North	1 – 2	Sheriff Y.C.	Market Lane, Balbriggan
		Report

27 October 2013	Cherry Orchard	0 – 3	Kilbarrack United	Elmsdale Crescent
		Report

27 October 2013	Shamrock Rovers (Wexford)	3 – 2	Willow Park	Fr. Murphy Park, Enniscorthy

30 October 2013	Bangor Celtic	2 – 3	Swords Celtic	Iveagh Grounds
		Report

10 November 2013	Bluebell United	0 – 1	Crumlin United	Caplo Park
		Report

== Fourth round ==
The 11 Leinster based League of Ireland clubs enter in this round in an open draw along with the 5 Third Round winners.

1 February 2014	Shamrock Rovers (Wexford)	2 – 2 (a.e.t.) (1 – 3 p)	Longford Town	Fr. Murphy Park, Enniscorthy
14:00	Peter Marsden 23'; Chris Kenny 72'		David O'Sullivan 8' 60'	Referee: Shane Dunphy
	Penalties
	??? (penalty missed) ??? (penalty scored) ??? (penalty missed) (penalty missed)		Don Cowan (penalty scored); Lorcan Shannon (penalty scored); David O'Sullivan (penalty scored)

12 February 2014	Crumlin United	4 – 0	Swords Celtic	Pearse Park
14:00	Alan McGreal 10' 79'; Ger Rowe 30'; David O'Keefe 88'	Report

17 February 2014	St. Patrick's Athletic	2 – 1	Dundalk	Richmond Park
19:45	Keith Fahey 63'; Daryl Kavanagh 73'	Report	David McMillan 69'	Referee: Neil Doyle

19 February 2014	Shamrock Rovers	5 – 1	Drogheda United	Tallaght, Dublin
19:45	Gary McCabe 8' (pen.); Simon Madden 12'; Kieran Waters 23'; Conor Kenna 78'; Ciaran Kilduff 84'	Report	Carl Walshe 35'	Stadium: Tallaght Stadium; Attendance: 700; Referee: Ben Connolly

19 February 2014	Wexford Youths	1 – 4	Athlone Town	Ferrycarrig Park
20:00	Danny Furlong 23'		Seán Brennan 8'; Graham Rusk 17'; Mark Hughes 60'; James O'Brien 68'

23 February 2014	Kilbarrack United	0 – 1	Sheriff Y.C.	Greendale Road
14:00			Alan McCabe 48'

27 February 2014	Bohemians	5 – 1	Bray Wanderers	Dalymount Park

?? 2014	UCD	2 – 2 (a.p.)	Shelbourne	Belfield Bowl

== Quarter-final ==
28 April 2014	Athlone Town	2–3 (a.e.t.)	St. Patrick's Athletic	Athlone Town Stadium
19:45	Marks 8'; Prendergast 37'		Verdon 48'; Bolger 77'; Kavanagh 114'	Attendance: ??? Referee: ???

28 April 2014	Shamrock Rovers	3–0	Bohemians	Tallaght Stadium
19:45	Sheppard 33' (pen.), 90+3'; Waters 65'	Report		Attendance: ??? Referee: ???

28 April 2014	UCD	1–3	Longford Town	???
19:45	Burke 35'	Report	Shaw 45'; Nkololo 66'; Shannon 67'	Attendance: ??? Referee: ???

?? 2014	Sheriff Y.C.	1 – 1 (a.e.t.) (5 – 4 p)	Crumlin United	Clontarf
??	Dunne 90'	Report	Moorehead 13'	Attendance: ??? Referee: ???

== Semi-final ==
20 May 2014	St. Patrick's Athletic	1 – 0	Shamrock Rovers	Richmond Park
19:45	Conan Byrne 45'	Report		Attendance: 750; Referee: Simon Rogers

20 May 2014	Sheriff Y.C.	1 – 2	Longford Town	Fairview Park, Dublin
19:45	Alan McCabe 46'	Report	Rhys Gorman 4'; Lorcan Shannon 10'	Attendance: ??? Referee: ???

== Final ==
9 September 2014	Longford Town	1 – 2	St Patrick's Athletic	City Calling Stadium
19:45	Tom Morris 57'	Report	Sam Verdon 34'; Jack Bayly 64'	Attendance: 500 (Est.); Referee: John McLaughlin
