= Derek Foran =

Irish footballer

Personal information
- Date of birth: 9 October 1989 (age 37)
- Place of birth: Dublin, Ireland
- Position: Centre back

Youth career
- Lourdes Celtic
- St Patrick's Athletic

Senior career*
Years	Team	Apps	(Gls)
2008	St Patrick's Athletic	0	(0)
2008	→ Bray Wanderers (loan)	23	(1)
2009	Bray Wanderers	25	(0)
2010–2011	Sligo Rovers	20	(0)
2012	Dundalk	25	(0)
2013	Shamrock Rovers	26	(1)
2014	St Patrick's Athletic	11	(0)
2015–2016	Sacramento Republic	37	(0)
2017	Bray Wanderers	12	(1)
- Templeogue United
- * Club domestic league appearances and goals

Derek Foran (born 9 October 1989) is an Irish former footballer who plays for Templeogue United.

== Career ==
Foran began playing football with Lourdes Celtic where he would play alongside future teammate Ian Bermingham. His form earned him a move to the club where he spent the majority of his youth football with, St Patrick's Athletic playing all the way up until he signed professional forms aged 16. He spent the 2008 League of Ireland season on loan at Bray Wanderers before making the move permanent for the following season. Two seasons at Sligo Rovers were followed by a season long stint at Dundalk, Shamrock Rovers and back at his first club St Patrick's Athletic followed for Foran, winning a total of 3 FAI Cups, 3 League Cups, 1 Setanta Sports Cup. across those years. In 2015, he signed a two-year contract with Sacramento Republic in America. Foran returned home and signed for another spell at Bray Wanderers in January 2017 ahead of the 2017 League of Ireland Premier Division.

== Honours ==
Sligo Rovers

- FAI Cup (2): 2010, 2011
- League of Ireland Cup (1): 2010

St Patrick's Athletic

- FAI Cup (1): 2014
