= 2013 St Patrick's Athletic F.C. season =

St Patrick's Athletic F.C.
2013 season
- Chairman: Garrett Kelleher
- Coach: Liam Buckley
- Stadium: Richmond Park
- Premier Division: 1st (champions)
- FAI Cup: Quarter-final
- League of Ireland Cup: Quarter-final
- Setanta Sports Cup: First round
- Leinster Senior Cup: Final
- UEFA Europa League: First Qualifying Round
- Top goalscorer: League: Anthony Flood (10 goals); All: Conan Byrne (13 goals)
- Highest home attendance: 3,313 vs Dundalk (20 September 2013)
- Lowest home attendance: 268 vs Longford Town (5 June 2013)
Home colours	Away colours	Third colours

The 2013 season was St. Patrick's Athletic F.C.'s 84th year in existence and their 62nd consecutive season in the League of Ireland. It was the second year that Liam Buckley was the team's manager, following replacing Pete Mahon in December 2011. St Pat's finished the season as the 2013 League of Ireland Premier Division champions. They were also Leinster Senior Cup runners up. They also competed in the UEFA Europa League, the FAI Cup, the Setanta Cup and the League of Ireland Cup.

== Squad ==
No.	Name	Nationality	Position (s)	Date of birth (age)	Previous club	Signed in	Club Apps.	Club Goals
Goalkeepers
1	Brendan Clarke	(Republic of Ireland)	GK	17 September 1985 (age 41)	(Republic of Ireland) Sligo Rovers	2012	102	0
16	David Ryan (Sold 31 July)	(Republic of Ireland)	GK	10 May 1988 (age 38)	(Republic of Ireland) Limerick	2013	6	0
25	Pat Jennings	(England)	GK	24 September 1979 (age 47)	(Republic of Ireland) Athlone Town	2013	0	0
30	Rene Gilmartin (Signed 18 July)	(Republic of Ireland)	GK	31 May 1987 (age 39)	(England) Plymouth Argyle	2013	3	0
Defenders
2	Ger O'Brien (vice captain)	(Republic of Ireland)	RB / CB / LB / CM	2 June 1984 (age 42)	(Republic of Ireland) Bohemians	2012	87	2
3	Jake Carroll (Sold 20 June)	(Republic of Ireland)	LB / CDM / CM / CB	11 August 1991 (age 35)	(Republic of Ireland) St.Patrick's Athletic Under 20's	2011	58	3
4	Conor Kenna (captain)	(Republic of Ireland)	CB	21 November 1984 (age 41)	(Republic of Ireland) Drogheda United	2010	153	3
5	Aidan Price	(Republic of Ireland)	CB	8 December 1981 (age 44)	(Republic of Ireland) Bohemians	2012	22	0
12	Ian Bermingham	(Republic of Ireland)	LB	6 June 1989 (age 37)	(Republic of Ireland) Shamrock Rovers	2010	158	2
14	Lorcan Fitzgerald (Signed 28 June)	(Republic of Ireland)	LB / CM	3 January 1989 (age 37)	(Republic of Ireland) Shelbourne	2013	4	0
15	Kenny Browne	(Republic of Ireland)	CB	7 August 1986 (age 40)	(Republic of Ireland) Waterford United	2012	77	3
18	Seán Gannon	(Republic of Ireland)	RB / CM / CB / RW	11 July 1991 (age 35)	(Republic of Ireland) Shamrock Rovers	2013	22	1
22	Seán Hoare	(Republic of Ireland)	CB / RB	15 March 1994 (age 32)	(Republic of Ireland) St Patrick's Athletic Under 19's	2013	4	0
–	Conor Mahony	(Republic of Ireland)	LB	5 January 1995 (age 31)	(Republic of Ireland) St Patrick's Athletic Under 19's	2013	2	0
–	Stephen Dunne	(Republic of Ireland)	CB / LB	12 September 1995 (age 31)	(Republic of Ireland) St Patrick's Athletic Under 19's	2013	1	0
Midfielders
6	Greg Bolger	(Republic of Ireland)	CDM / CM	9 September 1988 (age 38)	(Republic of Ireland) Dundalk	2012	76	8
7	Conan Byrne	(Republic of Ireland)	RW / LW	10 August 1985 (age 41)	(Republic of Ireland) Shelbourne	2013	44	13
8	Shane McFaul	(Republic of Ireland)	CDM / CM	23 May 1986 (age 40)	(Finland) FC Haka	2013	66	1
10	John Russell	(Republic of Ireland)	CM / CAM	18 May 1985 (age 41)	(Republic of Ireland) Sligo Rovers	2012	61	6
11	Killian Brennan	(Republic of Ireland)	CAM / CM / LW / RW	31 January 1984 (age 42)	(Republic of Ireland) Shamrock Rovers	2013	36	10
14	Jordan Keegan (Sold 2 July)	(Republic of Ireland)	RW / LW / CAM / ST	5 February 1992 (age 34)	(England) Scunthorpe United	2013	22	0
17	Chris Forrester	(Republic of Ireland)	LW / RW / CAM	17 December 1992 (age 33)	(Republic of Ireland) Bohemians	2012	80	18
19	Jake Kelly	(Republic of Ireland)	LW / RW / ST	18 June 1990 (age 36)	(Republic of Ireland) Bray Wanderers	2012	56	12
24	Stephen Maher	(Republic of Ireland)	CM / CDM / RB / RW	3 March 1988 (age 38)	(Republic of Ireland) Dundalk	2013	42	1
–	Gavin Boyne	(Republic of Ireland)	CM / CAM	17 April 1995 (age 31)	(Republic of Ireland) St Patrick's Athletic Under 19's	2012	2	0
–	Marco Chindea (Sold 2 July)	(Romania)	LW / RW / ST	18 April 1994 (age 32)	(Republic of Ireland) St Patrick's Athletic Under 19's	2012	2	0
–	Peter Hopkins	(Republic of Ireland)	RW / LW	21 September 1995 (age 31)	(Republic of Ireland) St Patrick's Athletic Under 19's	2013	1	0
–	Tom Mulroney	(Republic of Ireland)	CM	24 March 1995 (age 31)	(Republic of Ireland) St Patrick's Athletic Under 19's	2013	1	0
–	Jack Bayly	(Republic of Ireland)	CM / CAM	18 June 1996 (age 30)	(Republic of Ireland) St Patrick's Athletic Under 19's	2013	1	0
–	Tzee Mustapha	(Nigeria)	RW / LW	26 August 1995 (age 31)	(Republic of Ireland) St Patrick's Athletic Under 19's	2013	1	0
Forwards
9	Christy Fagan	(Republic of Ireland)	CF / ST	11 May 1989 (age 37)	(Republic of Ireland) Bohemians	2012	77	30
20	Anto Flood	(Republic of Ireland)	ST / CF / RW	31 December 1984 (age 41)	(England) Southend United	2012	56	12
21	Conor Murphy (Sold 2 July)	(Republic of Ireland)	ST / RW / LW	11 November 1992 (age 33)	(Republic of Ireland) Derry City	2013	7	0
21	Daryl Kavanagh (Signed 31 July)	(Republic of Ireland)	ST / RW / LW	11 August 1986 (age 40)	(Republic of Ireland) Cork City	2013	58	13
23	Peter Durrad	(Republic of Ireland)	ST	16 December 1994 (age 31)	(Republic of Ireland) St Patrick's Athletic Under 19's	2013	3	1
27	Philly Hughes (Signed 1 July)	(Republic of Ireland)	CF / ST	12 September 1981 (age 45)	(Republic of Ireland) Shelbourne (On loan)	2013	22	3

=== Transfers ===
==== In ====
Player	Country	Position	Signed from
David Ryan	(Republic of Ireland)	Goalkeeper	(Republic of Ireland) Limerick
Sean Gannon	(Republic of Ireland)	Defender	(Republic of Ireland) Shamrock Rovers
Killian Brennan	(Republic of Ireland)	Midfielder	(Republic of Ireland) Shamrock Rovers
Conan Byrne	(Republic of Ireland)	Midfielder	(Republic of Ireland) Shelbourne
Shane McFaul	(Republic of Ireland)	Midfielder	(Finland) FC Haka
Conor Murphy	(Republic of Ireland)	Forward	(Republic of Ireland) Derry City
Jordan Keegan	(Republic of Ireland)	Midfielder	(England) Scunthorpe United
Pat Jennings	(England)	Goalkeeper	(Republic of Ireland) Athlone Town
Stephen Maher	(Republic of Ireland)	Midfielder	(Republic of Ireland) Dundalk

==== Out ====
Player	Country	Position	Sold To
Sean O'Connor	(Republic of Ireland)	Midfielder	(Republic of Ireland) Shamrock Rovers
James Chambers	(Republic of Ireland)	Midfielder	(Republic of Ireland) Shamrock Rovers
Barry Murphy	(Republic of Ireland)	Goalkeeper	(Republic of Ireland) Shamrock Rovers
Pat Flynn	(Republic of Ireland)	Defender	(Republic of Ireland) Shelbourne
Dean Kelly	(Republic of Ireland)	Forward	(Republic of Ireland) Shelbourne
Ryan Coombes	(Republic of Ireland)	Midfielder	(Republic of Ireland) Athlone Town (On Loan)
Kevin Farragher	(Republic of Ireland)	Defender	(Republic of Ireland) Athlone Town (On Loan)
Roddy Collins Jnr. (U19s)	(Republic of Ireland)	Midfielder	(Republic of Ireland) Athlone Town (On Loan)
Eoin Hyland	(Republic of Ireland)	Defender	(Republic of Ireland) Bray Wanderers
Mark Rossiter	(Republic of Ireland)	Midfielder	(Republic of Ireland) Dundalk
Jamie McGlynn (U19s)	(Republic of Ireland)	Defender	(Republic of Ireland) Salthill Devon (On Loan)
Vinny Faherty	(Republic of Ireland)	Forward	(Republic of Ireland) Dundalk
Darren Meenan	(Republic of Ireland)	Midfielder	(Republic of Ireland) Dundalk
Stephen O'Flynn	(Republic of Ireland)	Forward	Retired
Hernany Macedo Marques	(Brazil)	Defender	Released

==== In ====
Player	Country	Position	Signed from
Lorcan Fitzgerald	(Republic of Ireland)	Defender	Free agent
Philly Hughes	(Republic of Ireland)	Forward	(Republic of Ireland) Shelbourne (On Loan)
Rene Gilmartin	(Republic of Ireland)	Goalkeeper	(England) Plymouth Argyle
Daryl Kavanagh	(Republic of Ireland)	Forward	(Republic of Ireland) Cork City

==== Out ====
Player	Country	Position	Sold To
Jake Carroll	(Republic of Ireland)	Defender	(England) Huddersfield Town
Marco Chindea	(Romania)	Midfielder	(Republic of Ireland) Waterford United (On Loan)
Jordan Keegan	(Republic of Ireland)	Midfielder	(Republic of Ireland) Dundalk
Conor Murphy	(Republic of Ireland)	Forward	(Republic of Ireland) Bohemians
Ryan Coombes	(Republic of Ireland)	Midfielder	(Republic of Ireland) Bray Wanderers
Jamie McGlynn	(Republic of Ireland)	Defender	(Republic of Ireland) Shelbourne
Dave Ryan	(Republic of Ireland)	Goalkeeper	(Republic of Ireland) Cork City

=== Squad statistics ===
==== Appearances, goals and cards ====
Number in brackets represents (of which were substituted ON). Last Updated – 26 October 2013

No.	Pos.	Name	Airtricity League		FAI Cup		EA Sports Cup		Europa League		Setanta Cup		Leinster Senior Cup		Total	
No.	Pos.	Name	Apps	Goals	Apps	Goals	Apps	Goals	Apps	Goals	Apps	Goals	Apps	Goals	Apps	Goals
1	GK	(Republic of Ireland) Brendan Clarke	30	0	3	0	0	0	2	0	1	0	1	0	37	0
2	DF	(Republic of Ireland) Ger O'Brien	33	1	3	0	1(1)	0	2	1	2	0	1	0	42(1)	2
3	MF	(Republic of Ireland) Jake Carroll (Sold 20 June)	7(3)	0	1(1)	0	1	0	0	0	2(1)	0	2	0	13(5)	0
4	DF	(Republic of Ireland) Conor Kenna	29(1)	0	3	0	1	0	2	0	2	0	3(2)	0	40(3)	0
5	DF	(Republic of Ireland) Aidan Price	10(4)	0	1(1)	0	1	0	1(1)	0	1	0	3	0	17(6)	0
6	MF	(Republic of Ireland) Greg Bolger	29(3)	1	3	1	0	0	2	0	0	0	2	0	36(3)	2
7	MF	(Republic of Ireland) Conan Byrne	33(2)	9	3	1	1(1)	1	2	1	2(1)	0	3(1)	1	44(5)	13
8	MF	(Republic of Ireland) Shane McFaul	16(5)	1	2(1)	0	2(1)	0	1(1)	0	1	0	1(1)	0	23(9)	1
9	FW	(Republic of Ireland) Christy Fagan	32(16)	8	3(1)	2	1	0	2	0	1	0	2	2	41(18)	12
10	MF	(Republic of Ireland) John Russell	26(3)	2	1(1)	0	1	0	2	0	0	0	2	0	32(4)	2
11	MF	(Republic of Ireland) Killian Brennan	28(1)	8	3	1	1(1)	0	2	1	2	0	0	0	36(2)	10
12	DF	(Republic of Ireland) Ian Bermingham	33	0	3	0	0	0	2	0	2	0	0	0	40	0
14	FW	(Republic of Ireland) Jordan Keegan (Sold 2 July)	2(2)	0	0	0	1	0	0	0	2(1)	0	2	0	7(3)	0
14	DF	(Republic of Ireland) Lorcan Fitzgerald (Signed 28 June)	1(1)	0	0	0	1	0	0	0	0	0	2	0	4(1)	0
15	DF	(Republic of Ireland) Kenny Browne	29	0	3	0	0	0	2	0	1	0	2	2	37	2
16	GK	(Republic of Ireland) David Ryan (Sold 31 July)	3	0	0	0	1	0	0	0	1	0	1	0	6	0
17	MF	(Republic of Ireland) Chris Forrester	32(3)	9	3(1)	0	1	0	2	0	2	0	2(1)	0	42(5)	9
18	DF	(Republic of Ireland) Sean Gannon	13(10)	0	1(1)	0	2	0	0	0	2(1)	0	4	1	22(12)	1
19	MF	(Republic of Ireland) Jake Kelly	16(12)	4	1	1	2	2	1(1)	0	0	0	3(1)	0	23(14)	7
20	FW	(Republic of Ireland) Anthony Flood	28(11)	10	2(1)	0	1	0	1(1)	0	2(1)	0	2(1)	1	35(15)	11
21	FW	(Republic of Ireland) Conor Murphy (Sold 2 July)	3(2)	0	0	0	1	0	0	0	2(1)	0	2(1)	0	7(4)	0
21	FW	(Republic of Ireland) Daryl Kavanagh (Signed 31 July)	9(2)	2	2(1)	0	0	0	0	0	0	0	1	0	12(3)	2
22	DF	(Republic of Ireland) Sean Hoare	0	0	0	0	1	0	0	0	0	0	3	0	4	0
23	FW	(Republic of Ireland) Peter Durrad	0	0	0	0	2(1)	1	0	0	0	0	1	0	3(1)	1
24	MF	(Republic of Ireland) Stephen Maher	8(5)	1	0	0	2	0	0	0	0	0	1	0	11(5)	1
25	GK	(England) Pat Jennings	0	0	0	0	0	0	0	0	0	0	0	0	0	0
27	FW	(Republic of Ireland) Philly Hughes (Signed 1 July)	0	0	0	0	0	0	1(1)	0	0	0	0	0	1(1)	0
30	GK	(Republic of Ireland) Rene Gilmartin (Signed 18 July)	0	0	0	0	1	0	0	0	0	0	2	0	3	0
-	MF	(Republic of Ireland) Gavin Boyne	0	0	0	0	1	0	0	0	0	0	0	0	1	0
-	DF	(Republic of Ireland) Conor Mahony	0	0	0	0	0	0	0	0	0	0	2(1)	0	2(1)	0
-	MF	(Romania) Marco Chindea (Sold 2 July)	0	0	0	0	1(1)	0	0	0	0	0	1	0	2(1)	0
-	MF	(Republic of Ireland) Peter Hopkins	0	0	0	0	0	0	0	0	0	0	1	0	1	0
-	MF	(Republic of Ireland) Tom Mulroney	0	0	0	0	0	0	0	0	0	0	1	0	1	0
-	MF	(Republic of Ireland) Jack Bayly	0	0	0	0	0	0	0	0	0	0	1(1)	0	1(1)	0
-	DF	(Republic of Ireland) Stephen Dunne	0	0	0	0	0	0	0	0	0	0	1(1)	0	1(1)	0
-	MF	(Nigeria) Tzee Mustapha	0	0	0	0	0	0	0	0	0	0	1(1)	0	1(1)	0

==== Top scorers ====
Includes all competitive matches. Last updated 26 October 2013

Position	Nation	Number	Name	Airtricity League	FAI Cup	EA Sports Cup	Europa League	Setanta Cup	Leinster Senior Cup	Total
MF	(Republic of Ireland)	7	Conan Byrne	9	1	1	1	0	1	13
FW	(Republic of Ireland)	9	Christy Fagan	8	2	0	0	0	2	12
FW	(Republic of Ireland)	20	Anthony Flood	10	0	0	0	0	1	11
MF	(Republic of Ireland)	11	Killian Brennan	8	1	0	1	0	0	10
MF	(Republic of Ireland)	17	Christopher Forrester	9	0	0	0	0	0	9
MF	(Republic of Ireland)	19	Jake Kelly	4	1	2	0	0	0	7
DF	(Republic of Ireland)	2	Ger O'Brien	1	0	0	1	0	0	2
MF	(Republic of Ireland)	6	Greg Bolger	1	1	0	0	0	0	2
MF	(Republic of Ireland)	18	John Russell	2	0	0	0	0	0	2
FW	(Republic of Ireland)	21	Daryl Kavanagh (Signed 31 July)	2	0	0	0	0	0	2
DF	(Republic of Ireland)	15	Kenny Browne	0	0	0	0	0	2	2
MF	(Republic of Ireland)	24	Stephen Maher	1	0	0	0	0	0	1
FW	(Republic of Ireland)	23	Peter Durrad	0	0	1	0	0	0	1
MF	(Republic of Ireland)	8	Shane McFaul	1	0	0	0	0	0	1
DF	(Republic of Ireland)	18	Sean Gannon	0	0	0	0	0	1	1
N/A	N/A	N/A	Own Goals	0	1	0	0	0	0	1

==== Top assists ====
Includes all competitive matches. Last updated 26 October 2013

Position	Nation	Number	Name	Airtricity League	FAI Cup	EA Sports Cup	Europa League	Setanta Cup	Leinster Senior Cup	Total
MF	(Republic of Ireland)	7	Conan Byrne	7	1	0	0	0	1	9
MF	(Republic of Ireland)	11	Killian Brennan	7	0	1	0	0	0	'8
FW	(Republic of Ireland)	20	Anthony Flood	5	0	2	1	0	0	8
MF	(Republic of Ireland)	10	John Russell	7	0	0	0	0	0	7
MF	(Republic of Ireland)	17	Chris Forrester	5	2	0	0	0	0	7
MF	(Republic of Ireland)	19	Jake Kelly	2	1	1	0	0	2	6
DF	(Republic of Ireland)	12	Ian Bermingham	6	0	0	0	0	0	6
FW	(Republic of Ireland)	9	Christy Fagan	2	2	0	0	0	1	5
DF	(Republic of Ireland)	2	Ger O'Brien	4	0	0	0	0	0	4
MF	(Republic of Ireland)	6	Greg Bolger	2	0	0	1	0	0	3
DF	(Republic of Ireland)	18	Sean Gannon	2	0	0	0	0	1	3
DF	(Republic of Ireland)	15	Kenny Browne	3	0	0	0	0	0	3
MF	(Republic of Ireland)	24	Stephen Maher	2	1	0	0	0	0	3
MF	(Republic of Ireland)	8	Shane McFaul	1	0	0	1	0	0	2
GK	(Republic of Ireland)	1	Brendan Clarke	1	0	0	0	0	0	1
DF	(Republic of Ireland)	3	Jake Carroll (Sold 20 June)	0	0	0	0	0	1	1
MF	(Republic of Ireland)	14	Jordan Keegan (Sold 2 July)	0	0	0	0	0	1	1

==== Top Clean Sheets ====
Includes all competitive matches. Last updated 26 October 2013

Position	Nation	Number	Name	Airtricity League	FAI Cup	EA Sports Cup	Europa League	Setanta Cup	Leinster Senior Cup	Total
GK	(Republic of Ireland)	1	Brendan Clarke	18	2	0	0	1	0	21
GK	(Republic of Ireland)	16	Dave Ryan (Sold 31 July)	2	0	0	0	0	1	3
GK	(England)	25	Pat Jennings	0	0	0	0	0	0	0
GK	(Republic of Ireland)	30	Rene Gilmartin (Signed 18 July)	0	0	0	0	0	0	0

==== Disciplinary record ====
Position	Nation	Number	Name	Airtricity League		FAI Cup		EA Sports Cup		Europa League		Setanta Cup		Leinster Senior Cup		Total	
Position	Nation	Number	Name	Yellow card	Red card	Yellow card	Red card	Yellow card	Red card	Yellow card	Red card	Yellow card	Red card	Yellow card	Red card	Yellow card	Red card
MF	(Republic of Ireland)	6	Greg Bolger	11	0	2	1	0	0	0	0	0	0	0	0	13	1
FW	(Republic of Ireland)	20	Anthony Flood	7	0	1	0	1	0	0	0	1	0	0	0	10	0
MF	(Republic of Ireland)	11	Killian Brennan	8	1	0	0	0	0	0	0	0	0	0	0	8	1
DF	(Republic of Ireland)	15	Kenny Browne	5	0	1	0	0	0	1	0	0	0	0	0	7	0
DF	(Republic of Ireland)	12	Ian Bermingham	5	0	1	0	0	0	1	0	0	0	0	0	7	0
MF	(Republic of Ireland)	10	John Russell	3	0	0	0	1	0	2	0	0	0	0	0	6	0
MF	(Republic of Ireland)	24	Stephen Maher	2	0	0	0	1	0	0	0	0	0	1	0	4	0
DF	(Republic of Ireland)	5	Aidan Price	1	0	0	0	0	0	1	0	0	0	1	0	3	0
DF	(Republic of Ireland)	4	Conor Kenna	2	0	0	0	0	0	0	0	1	0	0	0	3	0
MF	(Republic of Ireland)	8	Shane McFaul	3	0	0	0	0	0	0	0	0	0	0	0	3	0
DF	(Republic of Ireland)	2	Ger O'Brien	2	0	0	0	0	0	0	0	0	0	0	0	2	0
MF	(Republic of Ireland)	19	Jake Kelly	2	0	0	0	0	0	0	0	0	0	0	0	2	0
FW	(Republic of Ireland)	21	Daryl Kavanagh	2	0	0	0	0	0	0	0	0	0	1	0	3	0
FW	(Republic of Ireland)	9	Christy Fagan	0	0	1	0	0	0	0	0	1	0	0	0	2	0
MF	(Republic of Ireland)	7	Conan Byrne	1	0	0	0	1	0	0	0	0	0	0	0	2	0
DF	(Republic of Ireland)	18	Sean Gannon	0	0	0	0	1	0	0	0	0	0	0	0	1	0
FW	(Republic of Ireland)	23	Peter Durrad	0	0	0	0	1	0	0	0	0	0	0	0	1	0
GK	(Republic of Ireland)	1	Brendan Clarke	1	0	0	0	0	0	0	0	0	0	0	0	1	0
DF	(Republic of Ireland)	14	Lorcan Fitzgerald	0	0	0	0	0	0	0	0	0	0	1	0	1	0
MF	(Republic of Ireland)	17	Chris Forrester	1	0	0	0	0	0	0	0	0	0	0	0	1	0
			TOTALS	56	1	6	1	6	0	5	0	3	0	4	0	80	2

==== Captains ====
No.	P	Name	Country	No. games	Notes
4	DF	Conor Kenna	(Republic of Ireland)	37	Club captain
2	DF	Ger O'Brien	(Republic of Ireland)	5	Club vice captain
5	DF	Aidan Price	(Republic of Ireland)	4	

Last updated: 23 February 2013
Source: Competitive match reports.
Competitive matches only
Matches started as captain only
Country: FIFA nationality; No.: Squad number; P: Position; Name: Player name; No. Games: Number of games started as captain.

== Club ==
=== Technical Staff ===
- Manager: Liam Buckley
- Assistant Manager: Harry Kenny
- Head of Player Recruitment, Chief Scout, Coach: Dave Campbell
- Strength and Conditioning Coach: Ger McDermott
- Video Analysis: Graham Buckley
- Goalkeeping Coach: Pat Jennings Jr.

=== Kit ===
Supplier: Umbro
Sponsor(s): Clune Construction Company L.P. (Front of Jersey), Sandtex Exterior Paints (Back of jersey), Iceland (Sleeve of jersey)

Home	Home Alt	Home Third	Away	Third	Third Alt

The club's home and home alternate kits were retained from the 2012 season, with new away and third kits released for the season.

=== Matchdays ===
==== Days ====
Day	Airtricity League	FAI Cup	EA Sports Cup	Europa League	Setanta Cup	Leinster Senior Cup	Total
Friday	20	2	0	0	0	0	22
Monday	3	0	1	0	2	2	8
Tuesday	4	0	1	0	0	1	6
Saturday	3	1	0	0	0	0	4
Thursday	1	0	0	2	0	0	3
Sunday	2	0	0	0	0	1	3

==== Times ====
Time	Airtricity League	FAI Cup	EA Sports Cup	Europa League	Setanta Cup	Leinster Senior Cup	Total
19:45	22	2	1	1	1	2	28
20:00	4	0	1	0	0	1	6
15:00	2	0	0	0	0	1	3
17:00	1	1	0	0	0	0	2
19:30	1	0	0	0	1	0	2
19:35	1	0	0	0	0	0	1
19:05	1	0	0	0	0	0	1
21:10	0	0	0	1	0	0	1
17:15	1	0	0	0	0	0	1

==== Televised Matches ====
Time and Date	Channel	Competition	Opposition	Score	Location
19:30 GMT 11 February 2013	Setanta Sports	Setanta Cup	Glentoran	0–0 Draw	Richmond Park
19:35 GMT 15 March 2013	RTÉ Two	League of Ireland	Shamrock Rovers	0–3 Loss	Tallaght Stadium
19:05 GMT 19 April 2013	RTÉ Two	League of Ireland	Sligo Rovers	2–0 Win	Richmond Park
20:00 GMT 26 July 2013	Setanta Sports	League of Ireland	Cork City	2–1 Win	Richmond Park
19:45 GMT 3 September 2013	Setanta Sports	League of Ireland	Derry City	1–0 Win	The Brandywell
19:30 GMT 20 September 2013	RTÉ Two	League of Ireland	Dundalk	2–0 Win	Richmond Park
20:00 GMT 26 September 2013	Setanta Sports	League of Ireland	Bray Wanderers	3–1 Win	Carlisle Grounds
17:15 GMT 13 October 2013	RTÉ Two	League of Ireland	Sligo Rovers	2–0 Win	Richmond Park

==== Channels ====
Chanel	Airtricity League	FAI Cup	EA Sports Cup	Europa League	Setanta Cup	Leinster Senior Cup	Total
RTÉ Two	4	0	0	0	0	0	4
Setanta Sports	3	0	0	0	1	0	4

== Competitions ==
=== League of Ireland ===
The 2013 League of Ireland fixtures were announced on 19 December 2013. St Patrick's Athletic were revealed to have Drogheda United at home in the first day of the season, with an extra special Dublin derby away to Shamrock Rovers on the second day of the season following Pats' signing Killian Brennan and Sean Gannon, whilst Rovers signed James Chambers, Sean O'Connor, Barry Murphy and also assistant manager Trevor Croly as manager, from the Saints.

==== League table ====
Pos	Team	Pld	W	D	L	GF	GA	GD	Pts	Qualification or relegation
1	St Patrick's Athletic (C)	33	21	8	4	56	20	+36	71	Qualification for Champions League second qualifying round
2	Dundalk	33	21	5	7	55	30	+25	68	Qualification for Europa League first qualifying round
3	Sligo Rovers	33	19	9	5	53	22	+31	66	Qualification for Europa League first qualifying round
4	Derry City	33	17	5	11	57	39	+18	56	Qualification for Europa League first qualifying round
5	Shamrock Rovers	33	13	13	7	43	28	+15	52	

Rules for classification: 1) points; 2) goal difference; 3) number of goals scored.
(C) Champions

==== Results summary ====
Overall								Home						Away					
Pld	W	D	L	GF	GA	GD	Pts	W	D	L	GF	GA	GD	W	D	L	GF	GA	GD
33	21	8	4	56	20	+36	71	10	6	1	29	7	+22	11	2	3	27	13	+14

Last updated: 1 January 2013.

==== Results by round ====
Round	1	2	3	4	5	6	7	8	9	10	11	12	13	14	15	16	17	18	19	20	21	22	23	24	25	26	27	28	29	30	31	32	33
Ground	H	A	H^{1}	H^{2}	A	H	A	A	H	H	A	A	H	A	A	H	A	H	H^{3}	A	A^{4}	H	H	A	H	H	A	H	A	A	H	H	A
Result	W	L	W	D	W	L	W	W	W	D	W	W	D	W	W	W	L	W	W	D	W	W	D	W	W	D	D	W	W	W	W	D	L
Position	2	7	3	3	6	9	6	5	3	3	3	3	2	2	1	1	1	1	1	1	1	1	1	1	1	2	1	1	1	1	1	1	1

Updated to match(es) played on 1 January 2013. Source: 2013 League of Ireland
A = Away; H = Home; W = Win; D = Draw; L = Loss
Notes:
- ^{1} Matchday 3 (vs. Shelbourne) was postponed until between rounds 8 and 9 due to the surface at Richmond Park being deemed unplayable by referee Rob Rogers.
- ^{2} Matchday 4 (vs. Bohemians) was postponed until between rounds 10 and 11 due to the surface at Richmond Park being deemed unplayable by referee Tom Connolly.
- ^{3} Matchday 19 (vs. UCD) was rescheduled until between rounds 15 and 16 due to St Patrick's Athletic's participation in the 2013–14 UEFA Europa League First Qualifying Round.
- ^{4} Matchday 21 (vs. Derry City) was rescheduled until between rounds 26 and 27 due to Derry City's participation in the 2013–14 UEFA Europa League Second Qualifying Round.

==== Matches ====
Win Draw Loss

8 March 2013 Round 1	St Patrick's Athletic	1–0	Drogheda United	Inchicore, Dublin
19:45 GMT	Greg Bolger (yellow card) 35'; Shane McFaul 65'; Ger O'Brien (yellow card) 90+1'		Declan O'Brien (yellow card) 7'; Shane Grimes (yellow card) 68'	Stadium: Richmond Park; Attendance: 1,706; Referee: Alan Kelly

15 March 2013 Round 2	Shamrock Rovers	3–0	St Patrick's Athletic	Tallaght, Dublin
19:35 GMT	Ciaran Kilduff 20'; Pat Sullivan (yellow card) 28'; Gary McCabe 46'; Conor McCormack (yellow card) 74'; Ronan Finn 83'		Conor Kenna (yellow card) 30'; Shane McFaul (yellow card) 61'	Stadium: Tallaght Stadium; Attendance: 3,000 (Est.); Referee: Paul Tuite

19 March 2013 Round 3	St Patrick's Athletic	P–P	Shelbourne	Inchicore, Dublin
19:45 GMT				Stadium: Richmond Park; Referee: Rob Rogers
Note: The match was postponed until 15 April due to an unplayable pitch.

23 March 2013 Round 4	St Patrick's Athletic	P–P	Bohemians	Inchicore, Dublin
17:00 GMT				Stadium: Richmond Park; Referee: Tom Connolly
Note: The match was postponed until 29 April due to an unplayable pitch.

30 March 2013 Round 5	Limerick	0–1	St Patrick's Athletic	Moyross, Limerick
19:45 GMT	Joe Gamble (yellow card) 28'; Craig Curran (yellow card) 72'		Killian Brennan 19' (pen.); Shane McFaul (yellow card) 42'; Greg Bolger (yellow card) 75'	Stadium: Thomond Park; Attendance: 2,305; Referee: Anthony Buttimer

2 April 2013 Round 6	St Patrick's Athletic	1–2	Dundalk	Inchicore, Dublin
19:45 GMT	Ian Bermingham (yellow card) 35'; Ger O'Brien (yellow card) 40'; Conan Byrne 59'; Killian Brennan (yellow card) 70'		Dane Massey (yellow card) 12'; John Dillon 40' (pen.); Kurtis Byrne 61'; John Dillon (yellow card) 90'	Stadium: Richmond Park; Attendance: 1,105; Referee: Alan Kelly

5 April 2013 Round 7	Bray Wanderers	0–1	St Patrick's Athletic	Bray, County Wicklow
19:45 GMT	Paul Malone (yellow card) 21'; Kevin Knight (yellow card) 73'		Chris Forrester 25'	Stadium: The Carlisle Grounds; Attendance: 1100 (Est.); Referee: Paul Tuite

12 April 2013 Round 8	UCD	0–1	St Patrick's Athletic	Belfield, Dublin
19:45 GMT	James Kavanagh (yellow card) 39'; James Kavanagh (yellow card) 43' (red card)		Anthony Flood (yellow card) 21'; Anthony Flood 45+2'	Stadium: UCD Bowl; Attendance: 608; Referee: Tom Connolly

15 April 2013 Round 3	St Patrick's Athletic	4–0	Shelbourne	Inchicore, Dublin
19:45 GMT	John Russell (yellow card) 37'; Chris Forrester 44'; Conan Byrne 48'; Chris Forrester 53'; Greg Bolger (yellow card) 67'; Chris Forrester 82'		Jack Memery (yellow card) 26'; Brian Shortall (yellow card) 66'	Stadium: Richmond Park; Attendance: 1,216; Referee: Derek Tomney
Note: The match was originally scheduled for Tuesday 19 March, but was postponed due to an unplayable pitch.

19 April 2013 Round 9	St Patrick's Athletic	2–0	Sligo Rovers	Inchicore, Dublin
19:05 GMT	Conan Byrne 21'; Killian Brennan (yellow card) 54'; Killian Brennan 89' (pen.)		Kieran Djilali (yellow card) 50'; Danny Ventre (yellow card) 54'; Iarfhlaith Davoren (red card) 86'	Stadium: Richmond Park; Attendance: 1,656; Referee: Neil Doyle

26 April 2013 Round 10	St Patrick's Athletic	1–1	Derry City	Inchicore, Dublin
19:45 GMT	Conan Byrne 21'; Greg Bolger (yellow card) 80'		Barry Molloy (yellow card) 30'; Michael Rafter 37'; Rory Patterson (yellow card) 45+1'; Bary McNamee (yellow card) 67'; Ger Doherty (yellow card) 90+3'	Stadium: Richmond Park; Attendance: 1,404; Referee: Padraig Sutton

29 April 2013 Round 4	St Patrick's Athletic	1–1	Bohemians	Inchicore, Dublin
19:45 GMT	Kenny Browne (yellow card) 28'; Anthony Flood 29'; John Russell (yellow card) 90+2'		Dave Mulcahy 71'	Stadium: Richmond Park; Attendance: 1,384; Referee: Paul McLaughlin
Note: The match was originally scheduled for Saturday 23 March, but was postponed due to an unplayable pitch.

3 May 2013 Round 11	Cork City	0–2	St Patrick's Athletic	Turner's Cross, Cork
19:45 GMT	Daryl Horgan (yellow card) 24'; Darren Dennehy (yellow card) 46'		Anthony Flood 22'; John Russell 48'; Kenny Browne (yellow card) 82'; Christy Fagan (penalty missed) 84'	Stadium: Turners Cross; Attendance: 2,118; Referee: Rob Rogers

6 May 2013 Round 12	Drogheda United	1–2	St Patrick's Athletic	Drogheda, County Louth
15:00 GMT	Alan Byrne (yellow card) 38'; David Cassidy (yellow card) 51'; Declan O'Brien (penalty missed) 71'; Ryan Brennan 90'		Anthony Flood (yellow card) 70'; Christy Fagan 81'; Killian Brennan 90+2' (pen.)	Stadium: Hunky Dorys Park; Attendance: 944; Referee: Tomas Connolly

14 May 2013 Round 13	St Patrick's Athletic	0–0	Shamrock Rovers	Inchicore, Dublin
19:45 GMT	Greg Bolger (yellow card) 33'		Stephen Rice (yellow card) 44'; Karl Sheppard (yellow card) 85'; Sean O'Connor (yellow card) 85'; Derek Foran (yellow card) 89'	Stadium: Richmond Park; Attendance: 2,410; Referee: Graham Kelly
Note: The match was originally scheduled to be played on Friday 10 May 2013, but was moved due to Shamrock Rovers participation in the 2013 Setanta Sports Cup Final on Saturday 11 May 2013.

17 May 2013 Round 14	Shelbourne	0–3	St Patrick's Athletic	Drumcondra, Dublin
20:00 GMT	Pat Flynn (yellow card) 50'; Graham Gartland (yellow card) 68'; Sean Brennan (yellow card) 74'; Jack Memery (red card) 80'		Christy Fagan 53'; Christy Fagan 59'; Chris Forrester 76'; Killian Brennan (yellow card) 76'	Stadium: Tolka Park; Attendance: 1,418; Referee: Anthony Buttimer

24 May 2013 Round 15	Bohemians	0–2	St Patrick's Athletic	Phibsborough, Dublin
19:45 GMT	Dean Delany (yellow card) 71'; David Scully (yellow card) 72'; Kevin O'Leary (yellow card) 90'		Christy Fagan 24'; Killian Brennan 27' (pen.); Ian Bermingham (yellow card) 70'	Stadium: Dalymount Park; Attendance: 1,878; Referee: Alan Kelly

28 May 2013 Round 19	St Patrick's Athletic	5–0	UCD	Inchicore, Dublin
19:45 GMT	Killian Brennan 47'; Conan Byrne 52'; Chris Forrester 72'; Jake Kelly 83'; Jake Kelly 88'			Stadium: Richmond Park; Attendance: 963; Referee: Paul Tuite
Note: This fixture was due to be played on 5 July 2013 but was moved to an earlier date due to St Patrick's Athletic's participation in the 2013–14 UEFA Europa League First Qualifying Round on 4 July.

8 June 2013 Round 16	St Patrick's Athletic	3–0	Limerick	Inchicore, Dublin
17:00 GMT	Greg Bolger (yellow card) 24'; Jake Kelly (yellow card) 37'; Killian Brennan 43'; Anthony Flood 57'; Jake Kelly 90+3'		Rory Gaffney (yellow card) 61'	Stadium: Richmond Park; Attendance: 1,015; Referee: Paul McLaughlin

14 June 2013 Round 17	Dundalk	2–1	St Patrick's Athletic	Dundalk, County Louth
19:45 GMT	Kurtis Byrne 69'; Kurtis Byrne (penalty missed) 74'; John Sullivan 82'		Killian Brennan (red card) 33'; Brendan Clarke (yellow card) 44'; Christy Fagan 59'; Kenny Browne (yellow card) 74'	Stadium: Oriel Park; Attendance: Anthony Buttimer; Referee: 1,802

28 June 2013 Round 18	St Patrick's Athletic	2–0	Bray Wanderers	Inchicore, Dublin
19:45 GMT	Christy Fagan 7'; Christy Fagan 28'; Kenny Browne (yellow card) 80'; Ian Bermingham (yellow card) 89'		David Webster (yellow card) 15'; Kevin Knight (yellow card) 51'; David Webster (yellow card) 87' (red card)	Stadium: Richmond Park; Attendance: 1,094; Referee: Alan Kelly

5 July 2013 Round 19	St Patrick's Athletic	P–P	UCD	Inchicore, Dublin
19:45 GMT				Stadium: Richmond Park; Referee: N/A
Note: This fixture was rescheduled to Tuesday 28 May 2013 due to St Patrick's Athletic's participation in the 2013–14 UEFA Europa League First Qualifying Round on Thursday 4 July.

14 July 2013 Round 20	Sligo Rovers	1–1	St Patrick's Athletic	Sligo
15:00 GMT	David Cawley (yellow card) 36'; Iarfhlaith Davoren (yellow card) 65'; Evan McMillan 82'		Anthony Flood 16'; Ian Bermingham (yellow card) 45'; Stephen Maher (yellow card) 51'; Jake Kelly (yellow card) 65'; Greg Bolger (yellow card) 78'; Anthony Flood (yellow card) 87'	Stadium: The Showgrounds; Attendance: 3,180; Referee: Paul Tuite
Note: This fixture was due to be played on Saturday 13 July 2013 but was moved to a later date due to St Patrick's Athletic's participation in the 2013–14 UEFA Europa League First Qualifying Round on Thursday 11 July.

19 July 2013 Round 21	Derry City	P–P	St Patrick's Athletic	Derry, Northern Ireland
19:45 GMT				Stadium: The Brandywell; Referee: N/A
Note: This fixture was moved to Tuesday 3 September due to Derry City's participation in the 2013–14 UEFA Europa League Second Qualifying Round on Thursday 18 July.

26 July 2013 Round 22	St Patrick's Athletic	2–1	Cork City	Inchicore, Dublin
20:00 GMT	Anthony Flood (yellow card) 55'; Anthony Flood 62'; Greg Bolger (yellow card) 65'; Aidan Price (yellow card) 87'; Killian Brennan (yellow card) 89'; Killian Brennan 90+3' (pen.)		Daryl Kavanagh (yellow card) 13'; Danny Murphy (yellow card) 19'; Kalen Spillane (red card) 53'; Mark McNulty (yellow card) 53'; Ciaran Kilduff 59'; Ciaran Kilduff (yellow card) 83'	Stadium: Richmond Park; Attendance: 1,094; Referee: Padraig Sutton

2 August 2013 Round 23	St Patrick's Athletic	0–0	Drogheda United	Inchicore, Dublin
19:45 GMT	Greg Bolger (yellow card) 16'; Killian Brennan (yellow card) 25'		Shane Grimes (yellow card) 8'; Derek Prendergast (yellow card) 84'	Stadium: Richmond Park; Attendance: 1,343; Referee: Derek Tomney

9 August 2013 Round 24	Shamrock Rovers	0–4	St Patrick's Athletic	Tallaght, Dublin
20:00 GMT	Shane Robinson (yellow card) 29'; Derek Foran (red card) 34'; Pat Sullivan (yellow card) 35'; Sean O'Connor (red card) 53'; Ronan Finn (yellow card) 55'		Conan Byrne 5'; Conor Kenna (yellow card) 30'; Conan Byrne 35' (pen.); Conan Byrne 57' (pen.); Conan Byrne 62'; Kenny Browne (yellow card) 90+3'	Stadium: Tallaght Stadium; Attendance: 3,200 (Est.); Referee: Anthony Buttimer

16 August 2013 Round 25	St Patrick's Athletic	1–0	Shelbourne	Inchicore, Dublin
19:45 GMT	Greg Bolger (yellow card) 8'; Stephen Maher 39'		Glenn Cronin (yellow card) 42'	Stadium: Richmond Park; Attendance: 1,846; Referee: Paul McLaughlin

30 August 2013 Round 26	St Patrick's Athletic	1–1	Bohemians	Inchicore, Dublin
19:45 GMT	Daryl Kavanagh 20'; Killian Brennan (yellow card) 43'; Shane McFaul (yellow card)		Daniel Corcoran 76'	Stadium: Richmond Park; Attendance: 1,811; Referee: Alan Kelly

3 September 2013 Round 21	Derry City	0–1	St Patrick's Athletic	Derry, Northern Ireland
19:45 GMT	Barry McNamee (yellow card) 38'; Barry Molloy (yellow card) 58'; Shane McEleney (yellow card) 72'; Ryan McBride (yellow card) 90+6'		Killian Brennan 3'; Stephen Maher (yellow card) 82'; Killian Brennan (yellow card) 90+5'	Stadium: The Brandywell; Attendance: 900 (Est.); Referee: Tomas Connelly
Note: This fixture was due to be played on Friday 19 July 2013 but was moved to a later date due to Derry City's participation in the 2013–14 UEFA Europa League Second Qualifying Round on Thursday 18 July.

7 September 2013 Round 27	Limerick	0–0	St Patrick's Athletic	Moyross, Limerick
19:45 GMT	Patrick Nzuzi (yellow card) 61'; Stephen Bradley (yellow card) 66'; Jason Hughes (yellow card) 84'		Daryl Kavanagh (yellow card) 82'	Stadium: Thomond Park; Attendance: 1,014; Referee: Paul Tuite

20 September 2013 Round 28	St Patrick's Athletic	2–0	Dundalk	Inchicore, Dublin
19:45 GMT	Chris Forrester 51'; John Russell (yellow card) 54'; Daryl Kavanagh (yellow card) 57'; Anthony Flood (yellow card) 57'; Daryl Kavanagh 58'; Killian Brennan (yellow card) 72'; Chris Forrester (yellow card) 86'		Dane Massey (yellow card) 17'; Stephen O'Donnell (red card) 75'; Tiarnan Mulvenna (yellow card) 86'	Stadium: Richmond Park; Attendance: 3,313; Referee: Tomas Connolly

26 September 2013 Round 29	Bray Wanderers	1–3	St Patrick's Athletic	Bray, County Wicklow
20:00 GMT	Danny O'Connor (yellow card) 5'; Shane O'Connor (yellow card) 34'; Ismahil Akinade 83'		Conan Byrne (yellow card) 8'; Anthony Flood 37'; Anthony Flood (yellow card) 54'; John Russell 67'; Christy Fagan 90+5'	Stadium: The Carlisle Grounds; Attendance: 1,100 (Est.); Referee: Neil Doyle
Note: This fixture was due to be played on Friday 27 September 2013 but was moved to an earlier date on Setanta Sports decision due to television rights to the game.

4 October 2013 Round 30	UCD	1–3	St Patrick's Athletic	Belfield, Dublin
19:45 GMT	Robbie Benson 23'		Chris Forrester 31'; Anthony Flood 33'; Jake Kelly 55'; Ian Bermingham (yellow card) 71'	Stadium: UCD Bowl; Attendance: 1,248; Referee: Paul Tuite

13 October 2013 Round 31	St Patrick's Athletic	2–0	Sligo Rovers	Inchicore, Dublin
17:15 GMT	Greg Bolger 33'; Anthony Flood 42'		David Cawley (yellow card) 79'	Stadium: Richmond Park; Attendance: 3,211; Referee: Alan Kelly

18 October 2013 Round 32	St Patrick's Athletic	1–1	Derry City	Inchicore, Dublin
19:45 GMT	Anthony Flood 81'		Barry McNamee 34'; Conor Barr (yellow card) 64'; Simon Madden (yellow card) 79'	Stadium: Richmond Park; Attendance: 2,113; Referee: Padraig Sutton

25 October 2013 Round 33	Cork City	4–2	St Patrick's Athletic	Turner's Cross, Cork
19:45 GMT	Gearóid Mossisey 18'; Daryl Horgan 29'; Ciaran Kilduff 45'; Danny Morrissey 89'		Chris Forrester 54'; Ger O'Brien 78'	Stadium: Turners Cross; Attendance: 2,398; Referee: Alan Kelly

=== FAI Cup ===
Win Draw Loss

==== Second round ====
1 June 2013	St Patrick's Athletic	4–0	UCD	Inchicore, Dublin
17:00 GMT	Christy Fagan 31'; Christy Fagan 52'; Jake Kelly 62'; Gareth Matthews 79' (o.g.)		Gareth Matthews (yellow card) 37'; Cillian Morrison (yellow card) 89'	Stadium: Richmond Park; Attendance: 700 (Est.); Referee: Rob Rogers

==== Third round ====
23 August 2013	Bray Wanderers	0–3	St Patrick's Athletic	Bray, Wicklow
19:45 GMT	Danny O'Connor (yellow card) 67'; Kevin O'Connor (yellow card) 69'		Greg Bolger 18'; Anthony Flood (yellow card) 25'; Conan Byrne 61'; Killian Brennan 67' (pen.); Ian Bermingham (yellow card) 89'	Stadium: Carlisle Grounds; Attendance: 800 (Est.); Referee: Padraig Sutton

==== Quarter-final ====
13 September 2013	St Patrick's Athletic	0–2	Shamrock Rovers	Inchicore, Dublin
19:45 GMT	Christy Fagan (yellow card) 9'; Kenny Browne (yellow card) 52'; Greg Bolger (yellow card) 69'; Greg Bolger (yellow card) 78' (red card)		Conor Powell (yellow card) 12'; Ronan Finn 16'; Shane Robinson 33'; Billy Dennehy (yellow card) 41'; Ronan Finn (yellow card) 52'; Karl Sheppard (yellow card) 78'; Pat Sullivan (yellow card) 84'; Pat Sullivan (red card) 84'	Stadium: Richmond Park; Attendance: 2,790; Referee: Alan Kelly

=== Setanta Cup ===
The draw for the first round of the Setanta Cup took place on the sixth of December 2012. St Patrick's Athletic were drawn to play Irish League side Glentoran, with the first leg at home in Richmond Park on Monday 11 February 2013 live on Setanta Sports and the return leg on the 18th at The Oval in Belfast.

Win Draw Loss

==== First round ====
11 February 2013 First leg	(Republic of Ireland) St Patrick's Athletic	0–0	(Northern Ireland) Glentoran	Dublin, Republic of Ireland
19:30 GMT	Anthony Flood (yellow card) 85'		Calum Birney (yellow card) 15'; Jay Magee (yellow card) 67'; Marcus Kane (yellow card) 77'; Jason Hill (yellow card) 82'	Stadium: Richmond Park; Attendance: 1,041; Referee: Derek Tomney ( Republic of Ireland)

18 February 2013 Second leg	(Northern Ireland) Glentoran	1–0	(Republic of Ireland) St Patrick's Athletic	Belfast, Northern Ireland
19:45 GMT	Martin Murray 62'		Christy Fagan (yellow card) 42'; Conor Kenna (yellow card) 90'	Stadium: The Oval; Attendance: 600 (estimate); Referee: Hugh Carvill (Northern Ireland)

=== EA Sports Cup ===
Win Draw Loss

==== Second round ====
20 May 2013	Salthill Devon	2–3 AET	St Patrick's Athletic	Salthill, Galway
19:45 GMT	Derek O'Brien (yellow card) 7'; Willie Enubele (yellow card) 22'; Enda Curran 51'; Brian Geraghty (yellow card) 74'; Brian Geraghty 101'		Anthony Flood (yellow card) 29'; Sean Gannon (yellow card) 49'; Jake Kelly 60'; Jake Kelly 105'; Peter Durrad (yellow card) 111'; Peter Durrad 113'	Stadium: Drom; Attendance: 100 (Est.); Referee: Padraig Sutton

==== Quarter-final ====
23 July 2013	Shamrock Rovers	2–1 AET	St Patrick's Athletic	Tallaght, Dublin
20:00 GMT	Mark Quigley 52'; Gary McCabe (yellow card) 68'; James Chambers (yellow card) 95'; Billy Dennehy 108'		John Russell (yellow card) 45'; Conan Byrne (yellow card) 77'; Conan Byrne 79'; Stephen Maher (yellow card) 119'	Stadium: Tallaght Stadium; Attendance: 1,100 (Est.); Referee: Tom Connolly

=== Leinster Senior Cup ===
Win Draw Loss

==== Fourth round ====
25 February 2013	St Patrick's Athletic	3–1	Bangor Celtic	Inchicore, Dublin
19:45 GMT	Kenny Browne 20'; Kenny Browne 44'; Sean Gannon 84'		Michael Fox 3'; Andrew Farrell (yellow card) 72'	Stadium: Richmond Park; Attendance: 416; Referee: Ray Harvey

==== Quarter-final ====
4 June 2013	St Patrick's Athletic	2–0 AET	Longford Town	Inchicore, Dublin
19:45 GMT	Anthony Flood 96'; Stephen Maher (yellow card) 100'; Conan Byrne 109'		Keith Gillespie (yellow card) 39'; Brian McCarthy (yellow card) 53'	Stadium: Richmond Park; Attendance: 268; Referee: Rob Harvey

==== Semi-final ====
19 August 2013	Shelbourne	1–2	St Patrick's Athletic	Drumcondra, Dublin
20:00 GMT	Dean Kelly (yellow card) 27'; Garreth O'Connor 42'		Christy Fagan 19'; Daryl Kavanagh (yellow card) 49'; Christy Fagan 64'; Lorcan Fitzgerald (yellow card) 84'	Stadium: Tolka Park; Attendance: 350 (Est.); Referee: Rob Harvey

==== Final ====
20 October 2013	St Patrick's Athletic	0–1	Shamrock Rovers	Inchicore, Dublin
15:00 GMT	Aidan Price (yellow card) 29'		James Chambers 20'; Stephen Rice (yellow card) 37'; Billy Dennehy (yellow card) 58'; Sean O'Connor (yellow card) 79'; James Chambers (yellow card) 89'	Stadium: Richmond Park; Attendance: 700 (Est.); Referee: Ben Connolly

=== Europa League ===
Win Draw Loss

==== 1st qualifying round ====
4 July 2013 First leg	(Lithuania) VMFD Žalgiris	2–2	(Republic of Ireland) St Patrick's Athletic	Vilnius, Lithuania
21:10 EET	Artūras Žulpa (yellow card) 13'; Pavel Komolov 23'; Kamil Biliński 70'		John Russell (yellow card) 15'; Ian Bermingham (yellow card) 30'; Conan Byrne 55'; Ger O'Brien 87'	Stadium: LFF Stadium; Attendance: 3,000 (Est.); Referee: Mitja Žganec (Slovenia)

11 July 2013 Second leg	(Republic of Ireland) St Patrick's Athletic	1–2	(Lithuania) VMFD Žalgiris	Dublin, Republic of Ireland
19:45 GMT	Kenny Browne (yellow card) 11'; Killian Brennan 85' (pen.); John Russell (yellow card) 86'; Aidan Price (yellow card) 88'		Ramūnas Radavičius (yellow card) 21'; Mantas Kuklys 45+2'; Kamil Biliński 52'; Artūras Žulpa (yellow card) 57'; Egidijus Vaitkūnas (yellow card) 73'	Stadium: Richmond Park; Attendance: 3,000; Referee: Igor Pristovnik (Croatia)

=== Preseason friendlies ===
Win Draw Loss

26 January 2013	St Patrick's Athletic	3–0	Cherry Orchard	Dublin
Unknown Time GMT	Conan Byrne; Jordan Keegan; Conor Murphy			Stadium: Unknown Stadium; Attendance: N/A; Referee: Unknown Referee

31 January 2013	St Patrick's Athletic	10–1	St Patrick's Athletic Under 19s	Ashtown, Dublin
17:00 GMT	Christy Fagan; John Russell; Christy Fagan; Conor Murphy; Anthony Flood; Anthony Flood; Anthony Flood; Anthony Flood; Conan Byrne; Kenny Browne		Peter Hopkins	Stadium: Scribblestown; Attendance: N/A; Referee: Unknown Referee

4 February 2013	St Patrick's Athletic	7–2	Athlone Town	Blanchardstown, Dublin
19:55 GMT	Christy Fagan 17' (pen.); Christy Fagan 35'; Conan Byrne 40'; Conor Kenna 44'; Kenny Browne 74'; Anthony Flood 82'; Sean Gannon 90+2' (pen.)		Niall Lanigan (yellow card) 49'; Barry Clancy 69'; TBC (penalty missed) 79'; TBC 79'	Stadium: IT Blanchardstown; Attendance: 50 (Est.); Referee: Unknown Referee

21 February 2013	St Patrick's Athletic	6–0	Bluebell United	Inchicore, Dublin
19:45 GMT	John Russell; Christy Fagan; Conan Byrne; Anthony Flood; Conor Murphy; Aidan Price			Stadium: Richmond Park; Attendance: N/A; Referee: Unknown Referee

4 March 2013	St Patrick's Athletic	3–1	Sheriff Y.C.	Inchicore, Dublin
19:45 GMT	Killian Brennan (p); Conor Kenna; Anthony Flood		TBC	Stadium: Richmond Park; Attendance: N/A; Referee: Unknown Referee

23 March 2013	Tolka Rovers	1–2	St Patrick's Athletic	Glasnevin, Dublin
19:45 GMT	TBC		Jake Kelly; Jake Kelly	Stadium: Frank Cooke Park; Attendance: N/A; Referee: Unknown Referee

== Records ==
=== Overall ===
	Total	Home	Away
Games played	46	24	22
Games won	27	13	14
Games drawn	9	8	2
Games lost	8	4	5
Biggest win	5–0 vs UCD	5–0 vs UCD	4–0 vs Shamrock Rovers
Biggest loss	3–0 vs Shamrock Rovers	2–1 vs Dundalk, VMFD Žalgiris	3–0 vs Shamrock Rovers
Biggest win (League)	5–0 vs UCD	5–0 vs UCD	4–0 vs Shamrock Rovers
Biggest win (Cup)	4–0 vs UCD	4–0 vs UCD	3–0 vs Bray Wanderers
Biggest win (Europe)	N/A	N/A	N/A
Biggest loss (League)	3–0 vs Shamrock Rovers	2–1 vs Dundalk	3–0 vs Shamrock Rovers
Biggest loss (Cup)	2–0 vs Shamrock Rovers	2–0 vs Shamrock Rovers	1–0 vs Glentoran, 2–1 vs Shamrock Rovers
Biggest loss (Europe)	2–1 vs VMFD Žalgiris	2–1 vs VMFD Žalgiris	N/A
Clean sheets	24	14	10
Goals scored	76	39	37
Goals conceded	30	13	19
Goal difference	47	26	17
Consecutive Victories	7	4	8
Unbeaten run	15	10	8
Consecutive Defeats	1	0	2
Winless Run	4	3	4
Average GF per game	1.7	1.6	1.7
Average GA per game	0.6	0.5	0.7
Points (League)	71/99 (74%)	34/51 (67%)	35/50 (74%)
Winning rate	60%	54%	67%
Most appearances	Conan Byrne – 44	Conan Byrne – 24	Ger O'Brien – 20
Top scorer	Conan Byrne – 13	Conan Byrne – 6	Conan Byrne – 7

Last updated: 1 April 2013
Source: Competitive matches, extratime.ie
