= 2013 Leinster Senior Cup final =

Football match in Ireland

- Event: 2013 Leinster Senior Cup
St Patrick's Athletic	Shamrock Rovers
0	1
- Date: 20 October 2013
- Venue: Richmond Park, Dublin
- Referee: Ben Connolly
- Attendance: 600 (Est.)

The 2013 Leinster Senior Cup final was the last match of the 2013 Leinster Senior Cup. The match was played between 2013 League of Ireland champions St Patrick's Athletic and 2012 Leinster Senior Cup winners, Shamrock Rovers at Richmond Park on 20 October 2013. The match finished 1–0 to Shamrock Rovers, with James Chambers scoring the winner to secure Rovers their 18th Leinster Senior Cup title.

== Match ==
20 October 2013
15:00 GMT

St Patrick's Athletic	0–1	Shamrock Rovers
Aidan Price (yellow card) 29'	Report	James Chambers 20'; Stephen Rice (yellow card) 37'; Billy Dennehy (yellow card) 58'; Seán O'Connor (yellow card) 75'; James Chambers (yellow card) 89'

Richmond Park
Attendance: 600 (Est.)
Referee: Ben Connolly

St Patrick's Athletic	Shamrock Rovers

GK	16	(Republic of Ireland) Rene Gilmartin
RB	22	(Republic of Ireland) Seán Hoare
CB	15	(Republic of Ireland) Kenny Browne
CB	5	(Republic of Ireland) Aidan Price (c)	(yellow card) 29'
LB	12	(Republic of Ireland) Lorcan Fitzgerald
CM	18	(Republic of Ireland) Seán Gannon
CM	6	(Republic of Ireland) Greg Bolger	(substituted off) 45'
CM	10	(Republic of Ireland) John Russell	(substituted off) 63'
RW	7	(Republic of Ireland) Conan Byrne	(substituted off) 72'
ST	23	(Republic of Ireland) Peter Durrad
LW	17	(Republic of Ireland) Chris Forrester
Substitutes:
GK	1	(Republic of Ireland) Brendan Clarke
RB	2	(Republic of Ireland) Ger O'Brien
LB	3	(Republic of Ireland) Ian Bermingham
CB	4	(Republic of Ireland) Conor Kenna	(substituted on) 72'
CM	8	(Republic of Ireland) Shane McFaul	(substituted on) 45'
LW	19	(Republic of Ireland) Jake Kelly	(substituted on) 63'
ST	20	(Republic of Ireland) Anthony Flood
Manager:
(Republic of Ireland) Liam Buckley

GK	1	(Republic of Ireland) Barry Murphy
RB	22	(Republic of Ireland) Conor McCormack
CB	23	(Republic of Ireland) Sean Heaney
CB	26	(Republic of Ireland) David Elebert
LB	14	(Republic of Ireland) Daniel Ledwith
RM	10	(Republic of Ireland) Seán O'Connor	(yellow card) 75'	(substituted off) 79'
CM	6	(Republic of Ireland) Stephen Rice (c)	(yellow card) 37'	(substituted on) 85'
CM	8	(Republic of Ireland) James Chambers	20'	(yellow card) 89'
LM	20	(Republic of Ireland) Billy Dennehy	(yellow card) 58'
ST	17	(Republic of Ireland) Karl Sheppard	(substituted off) 19'
ST	27	(Libya) Éamon Zayed
Substitutes:
GK	16	(Republic of Ireland) Shane Fagan
CM	3	(Republic of Ireland) Cian Kavanagh	(substituted on) 85'
CB	4	(Republic of Ireland) Derek Foran
RM	7	(Republic of Ireland) Gary McCabe	(substituted on) 19'
CM	18	(Republic of Ireland) Ronan Finn	(substituted on) 79'
LM	19	(Libya) Muhanned Bukhatwa
CB	26	(Republic of Ireland) Nathan Brown
Manager:
(Republic of Ireland) Trevor Croly

== See also ==
- 2013 FAI Cup
- 2013 League of Ireland
- 2013 League of Ireland Cup
- 2013 Setanta Sports Cup
- 2013 FAI Cup Final
