= Stephen Maher =

Stephen Maher may refer to:

- Stephen Maher (footballer) (born 1988), Irish footballer
- Stephen Maher (hurler) (born 1993), Irish hurler
