= Chris Forrester =

Irish footballer (born 1992)

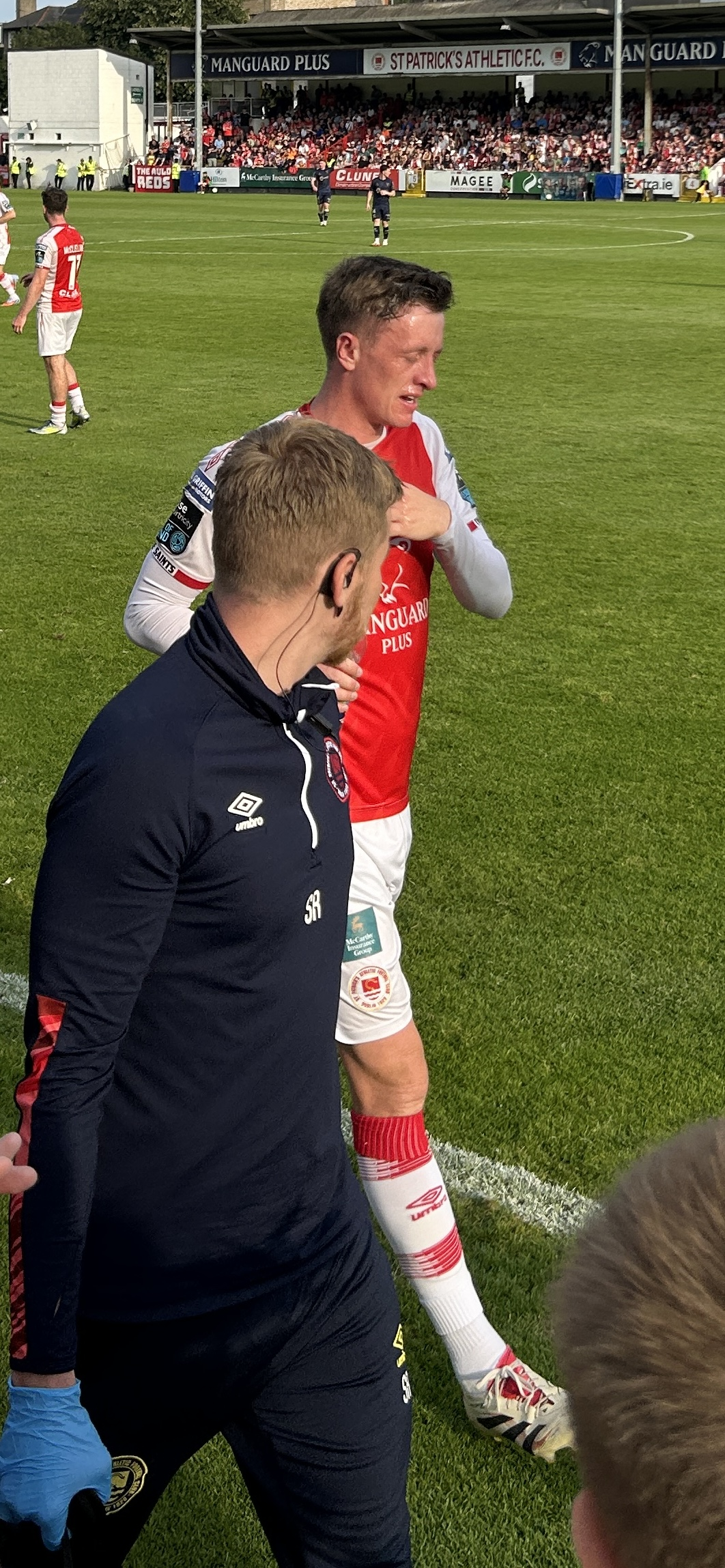
- Forrester with St Patrick's Athletic in 2025

Personal information
- Full name: Christopher Stephen Forrester
- Date of birth: 17 December 1992 (age 33)
- Place of birth: Dublin, Ireland
- Position: Midfielder

Team information
- Current team: St Patrick's Athletic
- Number: 8

Youth career
- Smithfield United
- 2005–2008: Bohemians
- 2008–2010: Belvedere
- 2010: Bohemians

Senior career*
| Years | Team | Apps | (Gls) |
| 2011 | Bohemians | 20 | (1) |
| 2012–2015 | St Patrick's Athletic | 112 | (38) |
| 2015–2018 | Peterborough United | 107 | (6) |
| 2018–2019 | Aberdeen | 5 | (0) |
| 2019– | St Patrick's Athletic | 244 | (42) |

International career
| 2013 | Republic of Ireland U21 | 2 | (0) |
- * Club domestic league appearances and goals as of 23:03, 30 October 2026 (UTC)

Christopher Stephen Forrester (born 17 December 1992) is an Irish professional footballer who plays as a midfielder for St Patrick's Athletic in the League of Ireland Premier Division. He has also previously played for Bohemians, Peterborough United, Aberdeen and the Republic of Ireland under-21's. In March 2016 he was called up to the Republic of Ireland senior squad but was not capped. In October 2026, he became the all-time record appearance holder for St Patrick's Athletic.

== Club career ==
=== Youth career ===
Forrester started his schoolboy career with his local team, Smithfield, where he stayed for three seasons. He played for Bohemians for three seasons before he moved on to Belvedere and was a member of the successful Belvedere side who won the FAI Under–17 Cup in 2010 by beating Carragaline United. After moving to the senior ranks, he rejoined Bohemians where he was a regular in their under 20s and A Championship team that reached the 2010 A Championship Cup final and the Dr. Tony O'Neill Cup final, although they were defeated in both.

=== Bohemians ===
With the financial uncertainty at Bohemians during the off season, Forrester found himself in the first team squad alongside some of ex Belvedere teammates such as Craig Sexton and Keith Buckley. He made his first team debut for the Gypsies on 7 March 2011 against Portadown at Shamrock Park. Having been on the bench for the opening league games, Forrester made his league debut for Bohs against UCD on 8 April 2011 in a 2–0 win at the UCD Bowl. He scored his first goal for the club against Bray Wanderers on 2 May 2011, netting the equaliser in a 1–1 draw. His performances on the wing impressed many as he became a regular in the first team including featuring in Bohs UEFA Europa League tie against Olimpija Ljubljana. Forrester capped the off the season by being awarded the club's Young Player of the Year award for 2011. During the season, Forrester also spent time on trial at Mick McCarthy's Wolverhampton Wanderers and Watford.

=== St Patrick's Athletic ===
==== 2012 season ====
Forrester joined St Patrick's Athletic on 12 January 2012 on a 2-year contract. He started the season off well, his impressive form in pre-season earned him a start in the league opener against Bray Wanderers. Forrester scored two excellent goals in a 4–0 twin over Phoenix in the Leinster Senior Cup at Richmond Park. The young winger provided an excellent assist for his old Bohemians teammate Christy Fagan to score in the Dublin derby against Shelbourne at Tolka Park, he called for a long ball from Ian Bermingham, made a superb run and flicked on a header to Fagan who slotted it home in the 43rd minute of the game. Forrester became a fans' favourite after he played brilliantly in the Saints' 5–1 thrashing of rivals Shamrock Rovers, he scored the opening goal of the game after just 3 minutes when he smashed a left footed shot into the top left corner, he then set up John Russell on a tee who tapped in from 5 yards to make it 2–0, then came one of the goals of the season by the 19-year-old as he collected Christy Fagan's backheel and scooped the ball over Oscar Jansson in the Rovers goal for 3–0 on 40 minutes. Unfortunately he picked up a back injury which hindered his performance in the second half but he was taken off for Dean Kelly in the 68th minute to an amazing reception by the Pats fans after a memorable performance by the winger. Forrester's scooped goal in the Dublin derby went viral on the internet and was shown on the 'Showboat' section of the hugely popular football TV show Soccer AM, earning him great recognition around the world. Greg Bolger benefited from a Forrester assist late on to make it 2–0 against UCD after a fine performance by the young winger. Forrester won the League of Ireland Player of the Month Award for April 2012 for his brilliant performances including the famous performance that made him a fan favourite against Shamrock Rovers. Forrester scored a header from a Ger O'Brien corner after 43 minutes at home to Dundalk in the Saints first loss of the season. He impressed many with excellent and mature performances in the Saints 2012 Europa League campaign, playing in five of their six games against ÍBV from Iceland, NK Široki Brijeg from Bosnia and Herzegovina and German Bundesliga side Hannover 96 at their 49,000 seater stadium, the Niedersachsenstadion (temporarily called AWD-Arena). During the European run, Pats league form dropped but he did score away to UCD in a disappointing 1–1 draw. Arguably Forrester's best form of the season was in the last two months, as he set up Jake Kelly and Vinny Faherty's goals vs Derry City from the bench in a 3–0 win, scored away to his former club Bohemians as his side won 3–2, yet again setting up Jake Kelly and Vinny Faherty in a 5–0 win over UCD and scoring in the last two away games of the season away to Sligo Rovers and Derry City. The last game of the season was a bad way to end a magnificent season for Forrester, as he played the full 120 minutes of Pats 2012 FAI Cup Final loss to Derry City at the Aviva Stadium, but he did win the free-kick that Sean O'Connor opened the scoring with as the Saints lost their 7th FAI Cup final in a row and failed to end their 51-year drought in the FAI Cup. After his first season at Pats ended, at the club's Player of the Year Awards night on 9 November 2012, he received the Supporters Young Player of the Year Award and the Goal of the Season Award for his famous lob against Shamrock Rovers. The following night, he won the PFAI Young Player of the Year Award, as voted by his fellow League of Ireland players. He also received more exposure in the World's media when he was named as number 28 in the hugely popular football website 101 Great Goals' list of the top 101 Youngsters in the World in 2012.

==== 2013 season ====
Having just been called into the Republic of Ireland under 21 squad, Forrester was watched by Republic of Ireland senior team manager Giovanni Trapattoni in Pats' league opener, a 1–0 win against Drogheda United. Forrester made his 50th career league appearance on 2 April 2013 in a 2–1 loss at home to Dundalk. His first goal of the season came on 5 April 2013 when he scored the winner against Bray Wanderers at The Carlisle Grounds, controlling a Kenny Browne pass with his chest, then placing a wonderful volleyed lob over Darren Quigley from a tight angle. He followed this up by scoring his first career hat-trick and also setting up Conan Byrne's goal in a 4–0 win for Pats at home to Shelbourne on 15 April 2013. Shelbourne would suffer further, on 17 May 2013 at Tolka Park when Forrester scored a header from a Killian Brennan corner, Pats third goal in a 3–0 win. Forrester scored his 6th of the season when he scored a beautiful chip to put Pats 3–0 up in a 5–0 win over UCD on 28 May 2013. Although he continued to assist his teammates' goals, Forrester went through a goal drought until he headed in the opening goal at home to title rivals Dundalk in a vital 2–0 win for Pats. He continued this form into the Saints title charge in the last month of the season, performing well away to Bray Wanderers and scoring and assisting away to UCD a week later in a 3–1 coming from behind. St Patrick's Athletic beat Sligo Rovers 2–0 on 13 October 2013 to win the 2013 League of Ireland, with Forrester coming in from the bench in the second half. A week later he picked up the first winners medal in professional football as the Saints lifted the league trophy following a 1–1 draw with Derry City. Forrester finished the season with a goal in a 4–2 loss against Cork City at Turners Cross in front of Republic of Ireland assistant manager Roy Keane. Forrester was voted the 2013 St Patrick's Athletic Young Player of the Season by supporters, his third club Young Player of the Year award in three years.

==== 2014 season ====
During the off season in the League of Ireland, Forrester trained with Bristol City. Unfortunately for Forrester, just before he looked to be offered a contract after impressing the coaching staff, then Bristol City manager Sean O'Driscoll was sacked. Before he went to train with Bristol City, he had agreed with Liam Buckley to sign back with St Patrick's Athletic for the 2014 season. It was announced that Forrester signed a new contract with the Saints on 14 December 2013, turning down Dublin rivals Shamrock Rovers. Forrester started the season off well, scoring in a 1–0 Setanta Cup win against Ballinamallard United at Ferney Park on 24 February 2014. On 2 March 2014, he was part of the starting 11 as his side beat Sligo Rovers 1–0 to win the 2014 President of Ireland's Cup, the inaugural year of the tournament. His first league goal of the season came on 4 April 2014 when he opened the scoring against Dundalk at Richmond Park. On 9 May 2014, he was named League of Ireland Player of the Month for the second time in his career, for the month of April. On 2 November 2014, he was part of the side that won the 2014 FAI Cup Final, the club's first FAI Cup win in 53 years. He scored 12 goals in 45 appearances in all competitions over the season.

==== 2015 season ====
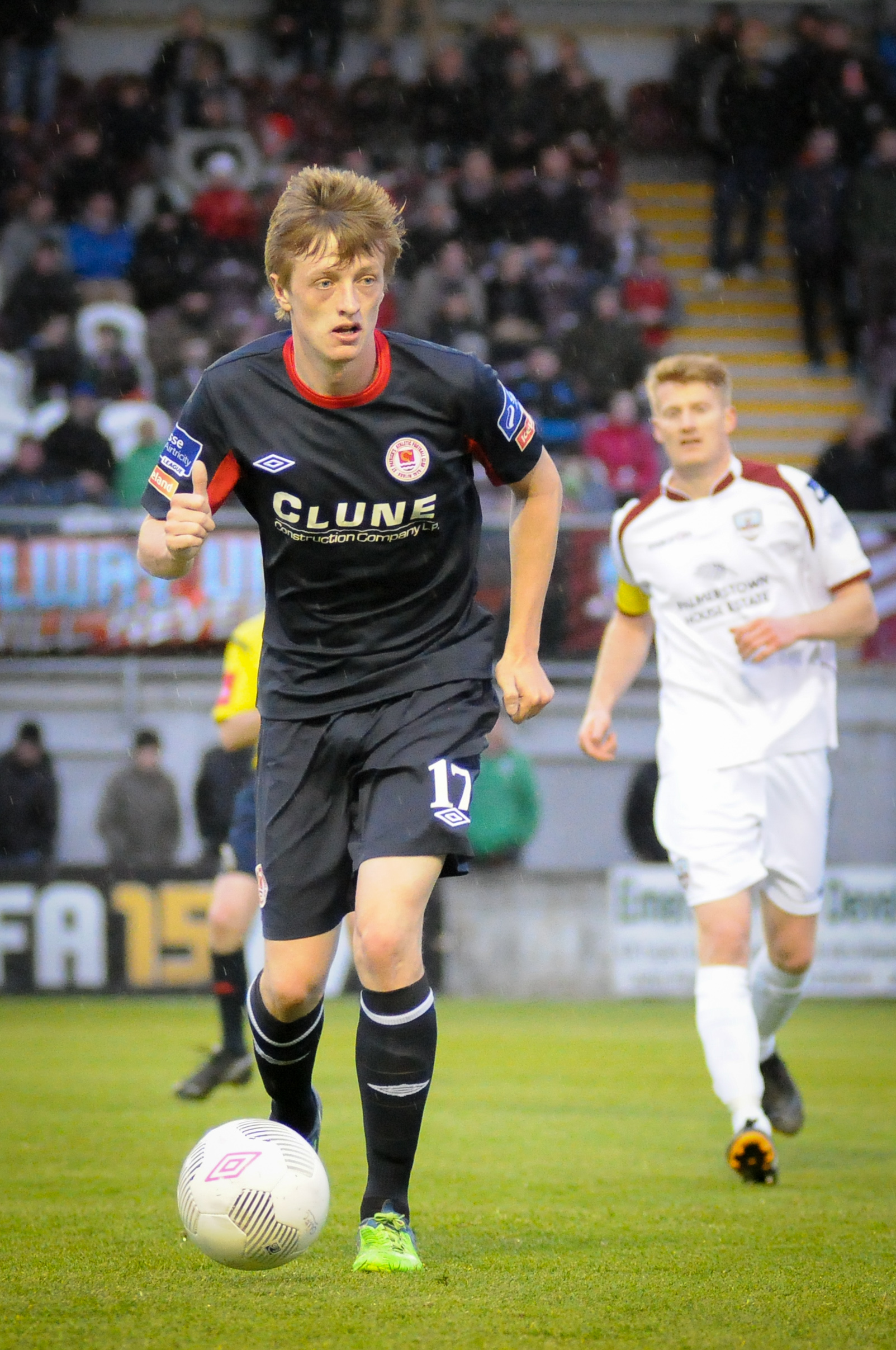
Forrester in action away to Galway United in 2015.

Forrester's first goal of the 2015 season was on 28 February 2015 in the 2015 President of Ireland's Cup, a 2–1 loss to Dundalk at Oriel Park. He scored a brace on 26 June 2015 in a 3–0 win over Longford Town at Richmond Park. On 7 August 2015, Forrester opened the scoring in a 2–0 win over Shamrock Rovers at Tallaght Stadium to equal a club record of 8 straight league wins. His last game for the club was on 23 August 2015 in a 4–0 FAI Cup loss to Cork City at Turners Cross. Forrester scored 12 goals in 33 appearances in all competitions during the season before departing the club.

=== Peterborough United ===
On 29 August 2015, Forrester signed a 3-year deal with League One club Peterborough United for an undisclosed fee. He scored his first goal for the club on 26 September 2015 in a 2–0 win away to Bradford City. In January 2016, Peterborough chairman Darragh MacAnthony stated that it would take a bid of 'way way over £3 million' for him to sell Forrester. In 2016, he came to prominence in Britain during a televised FA Cup tie with Premier League side West Bromwich Albion, earning praise from Gary Lineker and Alan Shearer. After an impressive debut campaign, which saw him earn comparisons to Michael Carrick, he was named club captain and rewarded with a new 3-year contract with the club, with the option of another year. He was subject to an array of bids from Wolves, QPR, and Derby County on the opening day of the January 2017 transfer window. On 8 January 2017, Forrester captained the side against Chelsea at Stamford Bridge in the FA Cup Third Round. Forrester was removed as club captain in June 2017. On 6 January 2018, he played the full 90 minutes as his side beat Aston Villa 3–1 at Villa Park in the FA Cup Third Round. During the 2017–18 season he fell out of favour, and was transfer listed by manager Steve Evans.

=== Aberdeen ===
Forrester signed a three-year contract with Scottish Premiership club Aberdeen in June 2018, with a reported transfer fee of £200,000 being paid. In June 2018, he scored the winning goal in a 1–0 win over Cobh Ramblers in a pre-season friendly, his first outing for the club. Forrester made his competitive debut for the club on 2 August 2018, coming off the bench in a UEFA Europa League game against Burnley at Turf Moor. His league debut came 3 days later in a 1–1 draw with Rangers at Pittodrie. He had his contract mutually terminated in January 2019 citing personal issues. Forrester made 8 appearances in all competitions during his time at the club.

=== Return to St Patrick's Athletic ===
==== 2019 season ====
Following the termination of his contract at Aberdeen on 22 January 2019, Forrester signed a three-year deal to return to St Patrick's Athletic in the League of Ireland Premier Division the following day, he was announced as part of a double signing with Scottish midfielder Rhys McCabe who had joined from Sligo Rovers. He made his returning debut for the club on 15 February 2019 in a 1–0 win over Cork City at Richmond Park on the opening night of the season. His first goal since his return to the club came in a 3–0 win over Wexford in the Leinster Senior Cup as he collected a Cian Coleman pass before setting himself to rifle into the top corner from 25 yards. Forrester's first league goal of the season came in a 2–1 win over Sligo Rovers on 19 April 2019, as he controlled a loose ball on his chest before looping a volley over Mitchell Beeney in goal to open the scoring. Forrester received the Man of the Match award after a 0–0 draw with Bohemians on 18 October 2019. He followed this up with another Man of the Match performance by scoring the equaliser in a 3–1 win away to Derry City 4 days later.

==== 2020 season ====
Forrester started off the 2020 season in fine form, scoring on his first start of the season in a 2–0 win over Sligo Rovers at The Showgrounds. On 26 September 2020, Forrester ended the club's longest goal drought in its history, scoring a 25-yard screamer into the top left corner to help his side beat Dublin rivals Shelbourne 2–0 at Richmond Park, ending a run of 709 goalless minutes spanning over 6 matches without a goal for the team. He played in 18 of the club's 19 league and cup games over the course of the shortened season due to the Coronavirus pandemic, as his side missed out on European football on the final day of the season, finishing in 6th place. His goal against Shelbourne was voted by fans as the club's Goal of the Season, Forrester's third time winning the award with the club.

==== 2021 season ====
The 2021 season started off brilliantly for Forrester and Pat's as they had their best start to a season in 13 years. His form was highlighted across national media with Forrester crediting the club's coaching staff with 'saving his career' and stating ″I'm the fittest I've ever been. I won't say that I don't deserve credit for it as well, but they came in and challenged me.″ On 30 April 2021 Forrester scored his first goals of the season with 2 goals in a 3–0 win over Longford Town at Richmond Park, the first of them being a curled shot into the top corner from 30 yards. Forrester continued his good form by opening the scoring in the Dublin derby against Shamrock Rovers on 8 May. On 12 May he was named League of Ireland Player of the Month for March/April, his fourth time winning the award in his career. On 9 July, he scored the winner in a 1–0 win at home to Derry City, finding the top corner from 15 yards. He followed that up by opening the scoring in a 2–0 win over Drogheda United a week later, tapping a Darragh Burns pass into the open goal. On 8 August, Forrester scored a penalty in a 4–1 win over Dundalk at Oriel Park. He scored the equalising goal from the penalty spot away to Finn Harps on 20 August in a 3–1 loss that damaged his sides title hopes. He made his 400th career appearance on 27 August 2021, scoring a 90th-minute penalty as well as another penalty in the shootout as his side knocked Cork City out of the FAI Cup at Turners Cross 4–1 on penalties after a 1–1 draw over 120 minutes. Forrester scored for the third game in a row a week later, putting his side 2–1 up in an eventual 3–2 win over Longford Town at Richmond Park by volleying into the roof of the net from 6 yards out, his 50th league goal for the club. On 23 November 2021, it was announced that Forrester was one of the 3 nominees for the PFAI Players' Player of the Year Award for 2021, alongside Roberto Lopes and Georgie Kelly. On 26 November 2021, he was named in the PFAI Team of the Year for 2021, as voted by his fellow players. On 28 November 2021 Forrester scored the opening goal of the 2021 FAI Cup Final, as his side defeated rivals Bohemians 4–3 on penalties following a 1–1 draw after extra time in front of a record FAI Cup Final crowd of 37,126 at the Aviva Stadium.

==== 2022 season ====
Forrester signed a new long-term contract with Pat's on 6 December 2021. On 11 February 2022, he started in the 2022 President of Ireland's Cup against Shamrock Rovers at Tallaght Stadium, missing his penalty in the shootout as his side lost 5–4 on penalties after a 1–1 draw. Forrester scored his first goal of the season on 4 March 2022, heading in a Darragh Burns corner in the 54th minute of a 1–0 win over rivals Shamrock Rovers at a sold out Richmond Park. On 21 July 2022, Forrester scored his first career goal at European level when he scored the equaliser in a 1–1 draw with Slovenian side NŠ Mura in the UEFA Europa Conference League. On 29 August 2022, he scored the second goal in a 3–1 win away to Bohemians, his first goal at Dalymount Park since 2012. 4 days later he opened the scoring in a 2–1 win at home to Finn Harps for his side's 4th win in a row. His third goal in 3 games came on 9 September 2022 in a 2–0 win away to Drogheda United when he scored a 95th-minute penalty to help his team to their fifth consecutive win. On 7 October 2022, he scored the scoring with a 25-yard strike into the top corner in a crucial 2–1 win for his side away to Dundalk in the race for Europe. His goal against NŠ Mura was voted by supporters as the winner of the Goal of the Season award at the club's awards night, Forrester's 4th time winning the award. Forrester was also voted by his fellow professionals as being in the PFAI Team of the Year for 2022, his second year running being voted in.

==== 2023 season ====
Forrester scored his first goal of the 2023 season on 6 March away to Sligo Rovers, finding the top corner from 25 yards. On 31 March 2023, he scored two goals against UCD in a 3–0 win at Richmond Park. On 10 April 2023, Forrester scored twice in a 3–1 win away to Drogheda United. Forrester scored directly from a corner to level the score at 1–1 in an eventual 3–2 win over Bohemians at Dalymount Park on 14 April 2023. On 21 April 2023, he made his 300th appearance for St Patrick's Athletic in a sold out Dublin derby at home to Shamrock Rovers. On 12 May 2023, he scored twice, in the 90th and 92nd minutes of a 3–0 win over Drogheda United at Richmond Park. On 5 June 2023, Forrester scored a header from a Thijs Timmermans corner to put his side 3–1 up in an eventual 4–1 win over Derry City at Richmond Park. 4 days later he scored a penalty to equalise away to Drogheda United just before half time to send himself top of the league's goalscoring charts. His 11th goal of the season came on 30 June 2023 when he gave his side the lead from the penalty spot in an eventual 7–0 win over UCD at Richmond Park. On 23 July 2023, Forrester scored the winner from the penalty spot in a 2–1 win away to Longford Town in the first round of the 2023 FAI Cup. On 4 August 2023, he scored the opening goal of the game in a 2–0 win away to Sligo Rovers at The Showgrounds. On 15 September 2023, Forrester scored a 48th-minute equaliser in a 2–1 win away to Finn Harps in the FAI Cup, to help earn his side a place in the Semi Final. His 15th goal of the season came on 25 September, when he equalised in an eventual 2–1 loss at home to Drogheda United. On 12 November 2023, Forrester was part of the starting XI in the 2023 FAI Cup Final, in a 3–1 win over Bohemians in front of a record breaking FAI Cup Final crowd of 43,881 at the Aviva Stadium. On 15 November 2023, it was announced that Forrester had been included in the PFAI Team of the Year for the third year in a row, and was one of the 3 nominees for the PFAI Player of the Year award, alongside Jonathan Afolabi and Ruairí Keating. On 2 December 2023, he was named PFAI Players' Player of the Year for the first time in his career.

==== 2024 season ====
On 20 December 2023, it was announced that Forrester had signed a new long-term contract with the club, with owner Garrett Kelleher stating "Chris and I met up a week or so ago, we spoke about life and football for three hours and then he told me he doesn't want to play for any other club. We shook hands on a deal that took five minutes for the rest of his career.". He scored his first goal of the season on 22 January in a Leinster Senior Cup game away to Usher Celtic by opening the scoring with the rebound of his penalty that had been saved. His first league goal of the season came on 24 May 2024, when he opened the scoring from the penalty spot in a 2–2 draw away to Bohemians at Dalymount Park. On 3 June 2024, he scored another penalty, this time to get his side back into the game in an eventual 3–2 loss at home to Dundalk. On 25 July 2024, he assisted his side's final goal in a 3–1 win over Vaduz of Liechtenstein in the UEFA Conference League, when his crossed free kick was met by a Joe Redmond header into the bottom corner. On 1 September 2024, Forrester scored a first half penalty in a 4–1 win over Drogheda United at Richmond Park. On 14 October 2024, he opened the scoring in a 3–1 win away to Bohemians with a deflected shot from 25 yards.

==== 2025 season ====
On 28 February 2025, Forrester came off the bench for Romal Palmer and scored his side's third goal, then assisted Aidan Keena's winning goal in a 4–3 victory at home to Sligo Rovers in what was his 300th league appearance for the club. On 14 March 2025, he opened the scoring in a 3–0 win over Bohemians at Richmond Park, before being named Man of the Match by Virgin Media Two who had televised the game. He scored his third goal of the season on 11 April 2025, opening the scoring in a 2–0 win away to Cork City at Turners Cross by finding the top right corner with his weaker left foot from the edge of the 18 yard box. On 25 April 2025, he opened the scoring in the 23rd minute from the penalty spot away to Bohemians, before being forced off at half time through injury. On 17 July 2025, Forrester became the club's standalone record appearance holder in European competitions, when he came off the bench in a 2–0 win away to Lithuanian side Hegelmann in the UEFA Conference League for his 25th European appearance for the club, surpassing Ian Bermingham's 24 appearances. On 20 July 2025, he scored a brace in an 8–0 win at home to UCC, dribbling past 4 players before passing into the bottom corner for his first goal, then firing into the bottom left corner from 25 yards for his second. On 24 July 2025, Forrester came of the bench in the 79th minute of his side's UEFA Conference League tie at home to Nõmme Kalju of Estonia, before scoring a 90th-minute winner in a 1–0 victory for his side. On 17 August 2025, Forrester scored his side's second goal of the game from the penalty spot in a 2–0 win over rivals Shelbourne in the FAI Cup. On 29 August 2025, Forrester assisted Mason Melia for the opening goal of the game away to Derry City, before scoring his 9th goal of the season from a Melia pass in the second half, which was the 100th goal of his senior career. On 14 September 2025, he scored a free kick in extra time to restore his side's lead, in an eventual 3–1 win at home to Galway United in the FAI Cup Quarter Final. On 10 October 2025, he opened the scoring in a 4–0 win over St Mochta's in the Leinster Senior Cup, chipping the keeper into the top left corner from the edge of the box to help earn his side a place in the final. He was voted by the club's supporters as St Patrick's Athletic Player of the Year for 2025.

==== 2026 season ====
Having started the season slowly due to multiple niggling injuries including a fractured toe, Forrester scored his first goal of the 2026 season on 1 May 2026, with a back post volley from a Zack Elbouzedi cross in a 2–2 draw away to Galway United at Eamonn Deacy Park. On 8 May 2026, Forrester scored the equaliser from the penalty spot in an eventual 4–1 win at home to Waterford. On 19 June 2026, Forrester came off the bench to score his side's second goal of the game in injury time to help them to a late 2–0 win at home to Sligo Rovers. In October 2026, he surpassed former teammate Ian Bermingham's all-time appearance records in both the league and in all-competitions for St Patrick's Athletic, ending the season with 356 league appearances for the club and 455 in all competitions.

== International career ==
After a fantastic 2012 season, Forrester was called up to his first ever international squad when he was called up to Noel King's Republic of Ireland under 21 squad on 25 January 2013 for a friendly against Netherlands under 21s at Tallaght Stadium on 6 February. He came on in the 57th minute to make his first appearance on the international scene in a 3–0 win for the Republic of Ireland. On 8 March 2013, he was watched by Republic of Ireland manager Giovanni Trapattoni in Pats' league opener, a 1–0 win against Drogheda United. Forrester retained his place in the Republic of Ireland under 21 squad for the Friendly game against Portugal under 21s when Noel King made his squad announcement on 13 March 2013. He came on from the bench at half time in a 2–1 loss for the Republic of Ireland at Oriel Park.

Forrester received his first call-up to the senior Republic of Ireland squad on 11 March 2016 for Ireland's friendlies against Switzerland and Slovakia. In advance of the call-up, former Republic of Ireland midfielder and ex-teammate of Forrester's Keith Fahey stated that Forrester was "Technically far better than the majority of the squad and that's not a pop (at them)."

== Career statistics ==
As of match played 30 October 2026

Appearances and goals by club, season and competition
| Club | Season | League | | | National cup (Note: Includes FAI Cup, FA Cup & Scottish Cup) | | League cup (Note: Includes League of Ireland Cup, EFL Cup & Scottish League Cup) | | Europe | | Other | | Total | |
| Club | Season | Division | Apps | Goals | Apps | Goals | Apps | Goals | Apps | Goals | Apps | Goals | Apps | Goals |
|---|---|---|---|---|---|---|---|---|---|---|---|---|---|---|
| Bohemians | 2011 | LOI Premier Division | 20 | 1 | 2 | 0 | 1 | 0 | 1 (Note: Appearances in the UEFA Europa League) | 0 | 3 (Note: One appearance in the Setanta Sports Cup; two appearances, one goal in the Leinster Senior Cup) | 1 | 27 | 2 |
| St Patrick's Athletic | 2012 | LOI Premier Division | 26 | 7 | 5 | 0 | 1 | 0 | 5 | 0 | 2 (Note: One appearance in the Setanta Sports Cup; one appearance, two goals in the Leinster Senior Cup) | 2 | 39 | 9 |
| St Patrick's Athletic | 2013 | LOI Premier Division | 32 | 9 | 3 | 0 | 1 | 0 | 2 | 0 | 4 (Note: Two appearances in the Setanta Sports Cup; two appearances in the Leinster Senior Cup) | 0 | 42 | 9 |
| St Patrick's Athletic | 2014 | LOI Premier Division | 30 | 11 | 5 | 0 | 1 | 0 | 2 (Note: Appearances in the UEFA Champions League) | 0 | 7 (Note: Four appearances, one goal in the Setanta Sports Cup; three appearances in the Leinster Senior Cup; one appearance in the President of Ireland's Cup) | 1 | 45 | 12 |
| St Patrick's Athletic | 2015 | LOI Premier Division | 24 | 11 | 2 | 0 | 3 | 0 | 2 | 0 | 2 (Note: One appearance in the Leinster Senior Cup; one appearance, one goal in the President of Ireland's Cup) | 1 | 33 | 12 |
| St Patrick's Athletic | Total | | 112 | 38 | 15 | 0 | 6 | 0 | 11 | 0 | 15 | 4 | 159 | 42 |
| Peterborough United | 2015–16 | League One | 35 | 2 | 5 | 0 | — | | — | | 1 (Note: Appearances in the EFL Trophy) | 0 | 41 | 2 |
| Peterborough United | 2016–17 | League One | 43 | 4 | 4 | 0 | 2 | 0 | — | | 1 | 0 | 50 | 4 |
| Peterborough United | 2017–18 | League One | 29 | 0 | 5 | 0 | 1 | 0 | — | | 3 | 0 | 38 | 0 |
| Peterborough United | Total | | 107 | 6 | 14 | 0 | 3 | 0 | — | | 5 | 0 | 129 | 6 |
| Aberdeen | 2018–19 | Scottish Premiership | 5 | 0 | 0 | 0 | 2 | 0 | 1 | 0 | — | | 8 | 0 |
| St Patrick's Athletic | 2019 | LOI Premier Division | 30 | 2 | 1 | 0 | 1 | 0 | 0 | 0 | 2 (Note: Appearances in the Leinster Senior Cup) | 1 | 34 | 3 |
| St Patrick's Athletic | 2020 | LOI Premier Division | 17 | 2 | 1 | 0 | — | | — | | — | | 18 | 2 |
| St Patrick's Athletic | 2021 | LOI Premier Division | 35 | 8 | 4 | 2 | — | | — | | — | | 39 | 10 |
| St Patrick's Athletic | 2022 | LOI Premier Division | 34 | 5 | 1 | 0 | — | | 4 (Note: Appearances in the UEFA Europa Conference League) | 1 | 1 (Note: Appearance in the President of Ireland's Cup) | 0 | 40 | 6 |
| St Patrick's Athletic | 2023 | LOI Premier Division | 36 | 13 | 5 | 2 | — | | 2 | 0 | 1 | 0 | 44 | 15 |
| St Patrick's Athletic | 2024 | LOI Premier Division | 36 | 4 | 1 | 0 | — | | 6 (Note: Appearance(s) in the UEFA Conference League) | 0 | 3 (Note: 1 appearance in the President of Ireland's Cup & 2 appearances, 1 goal in the Leinster Senior Cup) | 1 | 46 | 5 |
| St Patrick's Athletic | 2025 | LOI Premier Division | 28 | 5 | 4 | 4 | — | | 6 | 1 | 3 | 1 | 41 | 11 |
| St Patrick's Athletic | 2026 | LOI Premier Division | 28 | 3 | 3 | 0 | — | | — | | 3 | 0 | 34 | 3 |
| St Patrick's Athletic | Total | | 244 | 42 | 20 | 8 | 1 | 0 | 18 | 2 | 13 | 3 | 296 | 55 |
| Career total | | | 488 | 87 | 51 | 8 | 13 | 0 | 31 | 2 | 36 | 8 | 620 | 105 |

== Honours ==
=== Club ===
St Patrick's Athletic

- LOI Premier Division (1): 2013
- FAI Cup (3): 2014, 2021, 2023
- President of Ireland's Cup (1): 2014
- Leinster Senior Cup (3): 2013–14, 2018–19, 2023–24

=== Individual ===
Bohemians

- Bohemians Young Player of the Year (1): 2011

St Patrick's Athletic

- PFAI Player of the Year (1): 2023
- PFAI Young Player of the Year (1): 2012
- PFAI Team of the Year (3): 2021, 2022, 2023
- League of Ireland Player of the Month (4): April 2012, April 2014, June 2015, March/April 2021
- St Patrick's Athletic Goal of the Season (4): 2012 (vs. Shamrock Rovers), 2014 (vs. Drogheda United), 2020 (vs. Shelbourne), 2022 (vs. NŠ Mura)
- St Patrick's Athletic Player of the Year (1): 2025
- St Patrick's Athletic Young Player of the Year (2): 2012, 2013
- St Patrick's Athletic Total Appearances Record: 455 appearances

Peterborough United

- Players' Player of the Year (1): 2015–16
- BBC Radio Cambridgeshire Player of the Year (1): 2015–16
- PISA Player of the Year (1): 2015–16
- Away Travel Player of the Year (1): 2015–16
