= Stephen Maher (footballer) =

Irish footballer and coach

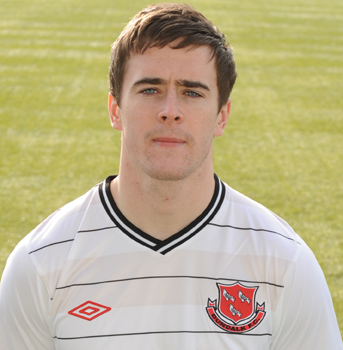

Personal information
- Full name: Stephen John Maher
- Date of birth: 3 March 1988 (age 38)
- Place of birth: Dublin, Ireland
- Position: Midfielder

Youth career
- 1995–2002: Home Farm
- 2002–2003: Cherry Orchard
- 2003–2004: Shelbourne
- 2004–2005: Dublin City

Senior career*
Years	Team	Apps	(Gls)
2005	Dublin City	0	(0)
2006–2008	Yeovil Town	7	(0)
2007	→ Shamrock Rovers (loan)	2	(0)
2008–2009	Salisbury City	3	(0)
2009	St Patrick's Athletic	21	(0)
2010–2011	Dundalk	43	(1)
2012	Monaghan United	13	(1)
2012	Dundalk	8	(1)
2013	St Patrick's Athletic	8	(1)
2014–2015	Drogheda United	43	(1)
2017–2019	Sheriff Y.C.		

International career^{‡}
- Republic of Ireland U18
2008	Republic of Ireland U21	3	(0)
- * Club domestic league appearances and goals as of 10:56, 3 July 2019 (UTC) ‡ National team caps and goals as of 22:00, 6 April 2010

Stephen Maher (born 3 March 1988) is an Irish footballer and coach.

== Club career ==
Maher spent time at Home Farm, Cherry Orchard, Shelbourne and Dublin City, where he first tasted the League of Ireland experience, featuring a number of times on the bench towards the end of the season as they eventually secured promotion from the First Division. Having had the opportunity to stay on for the Premier Division campaign, Maher had trials at Portsmouth and Reading.

In June 2006, he signed his first professional contract when penning a two-year deal with English League One club Yeovil Town. The following January, he made his debut against Nottingham Forest, as a late substitute at the City Ground. Shortly after, he had a two-month loan spell at Shamrock Rovers. After exploring the possibility of leaving Huish Park, Maher returned to the first team in March 2008. However, having been influential in their final games of the season, he was surprisingly released.

After trials at various clubs, Maher joined Conference side Salisbury City for a short spell in November 2008. In early 2009, he agreed a move to League of Ireland club St Patrick's Athletic, going on to enjoy a fine UEFA Europa League run as they defeated Valletta (Malta) – the opening leg seeing Maher pick up the Man of the Match award – and Krylia Sovetov (Russia) before bowing out to Steaua Bucharest (Romania).

In February 2010, he moved to Dundalk and, having been deployed as a right-back with the Saints, he reverted to his preferred midfield role at Oriel Park. He was a key figure in Dundalk's rise to the top of the league in the early months of the season. However, Europe took its toll on the side and Maher, and at the end of July he was sidelined with osteitis pubis. That was not before earning the Man of the Match award following an outstanding performance as captain – aged just 22 – against Levski Sofia (Bulgaria) in the second leg of their UEFA Europa League tie. Dundalk had defeated Grevenmacher (Luxembourg) in the opening round.

He returned towards the end of the season but, having earned a new contract, his injury nightmare persisted throughout 2011. With a change of manager at the club, Maher left and signed for Monaghan United ahead of the 2012 season. However, having found full fitness, Monaghan announced on 18 June that they would be withdrawing from the league, leaving 24-year-old Maher as a free agent.

A brief return to Dundalk until the end of the season was next for Maher before he signed for another of his old clubs, St Patrick's Athletic for the 2013 season, on 5 March 2013. In September 2014 while on as a substitute against Derry City Maher suffered a broken leg which forced him to miss the rest of the season.

On 12 March 2014 he signed for Robbie Horgan and Drogheda United. He made his debut two days later coming on as a second-half substitute against Bohemians.

== International career ==
At international level, Maher was capped at U18 level against Hungary before making his U21 debut in the Inter Continental Cup in Malaysia in 2008, playing against Malaysia, Australia and Nigeria. He was also called up to the U23 squad in October 2010 but was forced to pull out due to injury.

== Honours ==
St Patrick's Athletic

- League of Ireland Premier Division (1): 2013
