= Kevin O'Connor (footballer, born 1985) =

Irish footballer

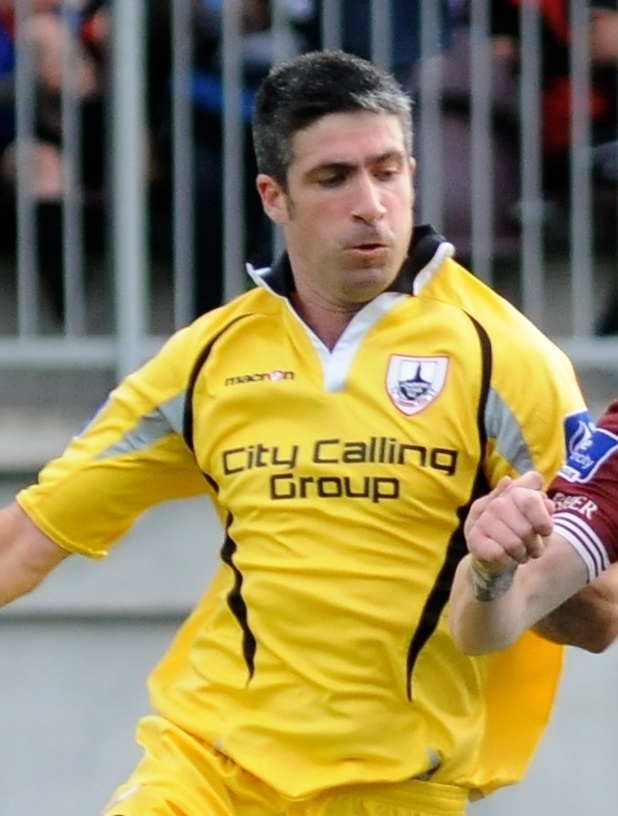
- O'Connor with Longford Town in 2014

Personal information
- Full name: Kevin O'Connor
- Date of birth: 19 October 1985 (age 41)
- Place of birth: Dublin, Ireland
- Position: Midfielder

Youth career
- Wolverhampton Wanderers

Senior career*
| Years | Team | Apps | (Gls) |
| 2004–2008 | Wolverhampton Wanderers | 3 | (0) |
| 2005–2007 | → Stockport County (loan) | 7 | (1) |
| 2010 | Telford United | | |
| 2010–2012 | Worcester City | 77 | (3) |
| 2012–2013 | Bray Wanderers | 33 | (1) |
| 2014–2017 | Longford Town | 103 | (9) |
- * Club domestic league appearances and goals

Kevin O'Connor (born 19 October 1985) is an Irish retired footballer.

== Career ==
=== Football League ===
O'Connor began his career at Wolverhampton Wanderers' Youth Academy and became a regular in the reserve team. He was never considered for the first team under Glenn Hoddle, and he instead joined League Two Stockport County on loan in March 2006, making seven appearances and scoring one goal. His league debut came on 8 April when he appeared as a substitute in a 3–3 draw at Cheltenham Town.

The appointment of Mick McCarthy as manager saw him promoted to the first team, making his senior debut for Wolves on 5 August 2006 at Plymouth Argyle, where he created Wolves' equaliser when his shot was deflected in to earn a 1–1 draw (later credited as an own-goal by Mathias Kouo-Doumbé). However, after playing in the opening three games, his season was ended by a long-term hamstring injury.

He was approaching fitness by the start of the 2007–08 season and given another one-year contract, as Wolves lined up a loan move to Gillingham for him; which he later rejected after becoming a father due to the long travelling distance. However, his hamstring problems again soon flared up and he spent the season again on the sidelines after having surgery in November 2007.

In May 2008 it was announced he would not be re-signed but would remain at the club continuing his rehabilitation in the short-term. He went on trial to League Two Port Vale.

=== Move into non-League ===
On 18 January 2010, O'Connor signed for Conference North team AFC Telford United, after having trained them for three weeks to regain fitness.

In June 2010, it was announced that O'Connor had signed for Conference North club Worcester City and in 2011 signed a new contract with the club.

=== Return to Ireland ===
In June 2012, O'Connor returned to his homeland when he signed for Bray Wanderers, where he linked up with his brother Danny O'Connor, already a key member of Pat Devlin and Keith Long's Wanderers squad.

In January 2014, he signed for League of Ireland side Longford Town, the team he had helped defeat as his winner in the 86th minute of the promotion-relegation final helped Bray stay in the Premier Division. He played a key role in helping 'De Town' lift the 2014 First Division title. O'Connor played for a further 3 seasons with Longford before leaving at the end of 2017.

== International career ==
O'Connor has been recognised by his country, being selected for Republic of Ireland Under-18, Under-20 and Under-21 squads.

== Personal life ==
He has two footballer brothers: James, who played for Orlando City until named the head coach for Louisville City FC; whilst Danny was his teammate at Bray.
