= 2013 League of Ireland Premier Division =

League of Ireland Premier Division
- Season: 2013
- Champions: St. Patrick's Athletic (8th title)
- Relegated: Shelbourne
- Champions League: St. Patrick's Athletic
- Europa League: Dundalk; Derry City; Sligo Rovers
- Setanta Cup: St. Patrick's Athletic; Dundalk; Sligo Rovers; Shamrock Rovers
- Matches: 198
- Goals: 523 (2.64 per match)
- Top goalscorer: Rory Patterson: 18 (Derry City)
- Highest attendance: 4,703 Shamrock Rovers 0–4 St. Patrick's Athletic
- Total attendance: 307,355
- Average attendance: 1,552 (Note: One attendance figure is missing from the 2013 season)

The 2013 League of Ireland Premier Division was the 29th season of the League of Ireland Premier Division. The division featured 12 teams. St. Patrick's Athletic were champions, winning their eighth top level League of Ireland title. Dundalk finished as runners-up.

== Teams ==
=== Stadia and locations ===
Locations of Premier Division teams
Locations of Dublin Premier Division teams

Team	Location	Stadium
Bohemians	Phibsborough	Dalymount Park
Bray Wanderers	Bray	Carlisle Grounds
Cork City	Cork	Turners Cross
Derry City	Derry	Brandywell Stadium
Drogheda United	Drogheda	Hunky Dorys Park
Dundalk	Dundalk	Oriel Park
Limerick	Limerick	Thomond Park
Shamrock Rovers	Tallaght	Tallaght Stadium
Shelbourne	Drumcondra	Tolka Park
Sligo Rovers	Sligo	The Showgrounds
St Patrick's Athletic	Inchicore	Richmond Park
UCD	Belfield	UCD Bowl

=== Personnel and kits ===
Team	Manager	Captain	Kit manufacturer	Shirt sponsor
Bohemians	Owen Heary	Owen Heary	Macron	Volkswagen
Bray Wanderers	Pat Devlin	Danny O'Connor	Adidas	Volkswagen
Cork City	Tommy Dunne; Stuart Ashton/Paul O Brien	Kevin Murray	Umbro	Clonakilty Blackpudding
Derry City	Declan Devine	Kevin Deery	Umbro	Diamond Corrugated
Drogheda United	Mick Cooke	Derek Prendergast	Nike	Scotch Hall Shopping Center
Dundalk	Stephen Kenny	Stephen O'Donnell	Umbro	Fyffes
Limerick	Stuart Taylor	Joe Gamble	Macron	Greenheat Group
Shamrock Rovers	Trevor Croly	Patrick Sullivan	Umbro	SEAT
Shelbourne	John McDonnell	Ian Ryan	Macron	Volkswagen
Sligo Rovers	Ian Baraclough	Danny Ventre	Umbro	Volkswagen
St Patrick's Athletic	Liam Buckley	Conor Kenna	Umbro	Clune Construction LP
UCD	Martin Russell	Mick Leahy	O'Neills	O'Neills

== Overview ==
The Premier Division featured 12 teams. Each team played each other three times, totalling 33 games. The regular season began on 8 March and concluded on 25 October. St. Patrick's Athletic clinched the title on 13 October 2013, with two games to go, after a 2–0 win against the holders, Sligo Rovers.

== Final Table ==
Pos	Team	Pld	W	D	L	GF	GA	GD	Pts	Qualification or relegation
1	St Patrick's Athletic (C)	33	21	8	4	56	20	+36	71	Qualification for Champions League second qualifying round
2	Dundalk	33	21	5	7	55	30	+25	68	Qualification for Europa League first qualifying round
3	Sligo Rovers	33	19	9	5	53	22	+31	66	Qualification for Europa League first qualifying round
4	Derry City	33	17	5	11	57	39	+18	56	Qualification for Europa League first qualifying round
5	Shamrock Rovers	33	13	13	7	43	28	+15	52	
6	Cork City	33	13	7	13	47	50	−3	46	
7	Limerick	33	11	9	13	38	46	−8	42	
8	Drogheda United	33	8	14	11	44	46	−2	38	
9	UCD	33	8	6	19	45	73	−28	30	
10	Bohemians	33	7	8	18	27	47	−20	29	
11	Bray Wanderers (O)	33	7	6	20	33	66	−33	27	Qualification for relegation play-off
12	Shelbourne (R)	33	5	6	22	25	56	−31	21	Relegation for League of Ireland First Division

Rules for classification: 1) points; 2) goal difference; 3) number of goals scored.
(C) Champions; (O) Play-off winners; (R) Relegated

== Results ==
=== Matches 1–22 ===
Home \ Away	BOH	BRW	COR	DER	DRO	DUN	LIM	SHM	SHE	SLI	StP	UCD
Bohemians	—	3–2	1–2	0–4	1–1	0–2	0–1	0–0	0–3	0–3	0–2	2–1
Bray Wanderers	1–3	—	1–2	2–3	3–2	0–1	0–4	0–0	1–0	0–0	0–1	2–2
Cork City	2–1	1–3	—	0–1	1–0	2–2	2–3	1–2	1–1	3–1	0–2	2–1
Derry City	2–1	2–0	1–1	—	1–1	0–1	2–1	2–1	4–0	0–1	0–1	2–4
Drogheda United	2–2	2–1	1–1	2–3	—	0–1	2–2	0–3	0–0	1–1	1–2	3–2
Dundalk	3–0	1–0	2–0	1–3	2–2	—	2–2	0–0	1–0	1–3	2–1	2–3
Limerick	2–1	4–4	0–0	0–1	0–1	3–2	—	1–1	0–0	0–0	0–1	3–1
Shamrock Rovers	1–1	7–0	1–1	2–1	1–1	1–0	1–0	—	1–0	1–1	3–0	1–1
Shelbourne	0–1	1–2	2–1	0–1	1–3	1–3	2–1	0–0	—	0–2	0–3	2–0
Sligo Rovers	0–0	3–0	2–0	3–0	2–2	0–1	2–1	0–0	2–0	—	1–1	5–2
St Patrick's Athletic	1–1	2–0	2–1	1–1	1–0	1–2	3–0	0–0	4–0	2–0	—	5–0
UCD	1–0	4–5	3–0	0–6	2–2	1–2	1–1	2–0	1–2	0–3	0–1	—

Legend: Blue = home team win; Yellow = draw; Red = away team win.

=== Matches 23–33 ===
Home \ Away	BOH	BRW	COR	DER	DRO	DUN	LIM	SHM	SHE	SLI	StP	UCD
Bohemians	—	0–1	—	2–0	—	1–1	—	1–0	—	0–2	—	1–3
Bray Wanderers	—	—	1–2	—	—	0–2	1–0	—	1–1	—	1–3	1–1
Cork City	1–0	—	—	4–1	—	—	—	—	5–3	—	4–2	2–0
Derry City	—	2–0	—	—	0–2	—	6–0	0–0	3–1	1–2	—	—
Drogheda United	1–0	2–0	2–3	—	—	—	3–0	—	—	—	—	1–0
Dundalk	—	—	4–0	3–0	1–0	—	1–2	3–1	—	2–0	—	—
Limerick	1–0	—	2–1	—	—	—	—	2–0	1–0	—	0–0	1–3
Shamrock Rovers	—	3–0	2–1	—	3–1	—	—	—	—	1–2	0–4	—
Shelbourne	0–3	—	—	—	2–2	1–2	—	1–2	—	—	—	1–2
Sligo Rovers	—	2–0	0–0	—	3–1	—	2–0	—	2–0	—	—	—
St Patrick's Athletic	1–1	—	—	1–1	0–0	2–0	—	—	1–0	2–0	—	—
UCD	—	—	—	1–3	—	0–2	—	1–4	—	0–3	1–3	—

Legend: Blue = home team win; Yellow = draw; Red = away team win.

== Promotion/relegation play-off ==
Bray Wanderers, the eleventh placed team from the Premier Division, played off against Longford Town, the winners of the 2013 First Division play off. The winner of this play off would play in the 2014 Premier Division.

28 October 2013	Bray Wanderers	2–2	Longford Town	Carlisle Grounds
19.45	Jason Byrne 8', 31'	Report	Dean Ebbe 61'; David O'Sullivan 83'	Attendance: 900 (estimated); Referee: Graham Kelly

1 November 2013	Longford Town	2–3	Bray Wanderers	City Calling Stadium
19.45	Daniel Purdy 58', 79'; Noel Haverty (red card) 90+2'	Report	Gary Dempsey 3'; Kieran Waters 73'; Kevin O'Connor 86'; Shane O'Connor (red card) 90+2'	Attendance: unknown Referee: Derek Tomney (Dublin)

Bray Wanderers win 5–4 on aggregate and retained their place in the Premier Division.

== Goal scorers ==
=== Top scorers ===
Rank	Player	Club	Goals
1	Rory Patterson	Derry City	18
2	Declan O'Brien	Drogheda United	14
3	Ciarán Kilduff	Cork City	13
3	Patrick Hoban	Dundalk	13
3	David McMillan	Sligo Rovers	13

=== Hat-tricks ===
Player	For	Against	Result	Date	Goals
Rory Patterson	Derry City	University College Dublin	6–0	15 March 2013	3
Chris Forrester	St Patrick's Athletic	Shelbourne	4–0	15 April 2013	3
Jason Byrne	Bray Wanderers	Drogheda United	3–2	24 May 2013	3
Jason Byrne	Bray Wanderers	UCD	5–4	8 June 2013	4
Patrick Hoban	Dundalk	Bohemians	3–0	12 July 2013	3
Conan Byrne	St Patrick's Athletic	Shamrock Rovers	4–0	10 August 2013	4
Danny Morrissey	Cork City	Derry City	4–1	30 August 2013	3
Richie Towell	Dundalk	Derry City	3–0	30 September 2013	3
Ciarán Kilduff	Cork City	Shelbourne	5–3	10 October 2013	4
David McDaid	Derry City	Limerick	6–0	25 October 2013	3

== Awards ==
=== Player of the Month ===
Month	Player	Club
March	Anthony Elding	Sligo Rovers
April	Barry McNamee	Derry City
May	Killian Brennan	St Patrick's Athletic
June	Jason Byrne	Bray Wanderers
July	Patrick Hoban	Dundalk
August	Richie Towell	Dundalk
September	Anthony Flood	St Patrick's Athletic
October	Ciaran Kilduff	Cork City
November	Danny North	Sligo Rovers

=== PFAI Players' Player of the Year ===
Winner	Club
Killian Brennan	St. Patrick's Athletic

=== PFAI Young Player of the Year ===
Winner	Club
Richie Towell	Dundalk

=== Team of the Year ===
PFAI Team of the Year
Goalkeeper	(Republic of Ireland) Brendan Clarke (St Patrick's Athletic)			
Defenders	(Republic of Ireland) Ger O'Brien (St Patrick's Athletic)	(Republic of Ireland) Kenny Browne (St Patrick's Athletic)	(Republic of Ireland) Andy Boyle (Dundalk)	(Republic of Ireland) Ian Bermingham (St Patrick's Athletic)
Midfielders	(Republic of Ireland) Killian Brennan (St Patrick's Athletic)	(Republic of Ireland) Greg Bolger (St Patrick's Athletic)	(Republic of Ireland) Daryl Horgan (Cork City)	(Republic of Ireland) Richie Towell (Dundalk)
Forwards	(Republic of Ireland) Patrick Hoban (Dundalk)		(Northern Ireland) Rory Patterson (Derry City)	

== Television coverage ==
Live coverage of matches in Ireland were shown on RTÉ Two and Setanta Sports. MNS on RTÉ Two showed match highlights and analysis on each Monday night during the season.

== Attendances ==
No.	Club	Average
1	Shamrock Rovers	2,787
2	Sligo Rovers	2,342
3	Dundalk	1,974
4	Cork City	1,965
5	St. Patrick's Athletic	1,661
6	Bohemian	1,609
7	Limerick	1,571
8	Derry City	1,491
9	Shelbourne	1,114
10	Bray Wanderers	860
11	Drogheda United	847
12	UCD	486

== See also ==
- 2013 League of Ireland First Division
- 2013 League of Ireland Cup
