= Jordan Keegan =

Irish footballer

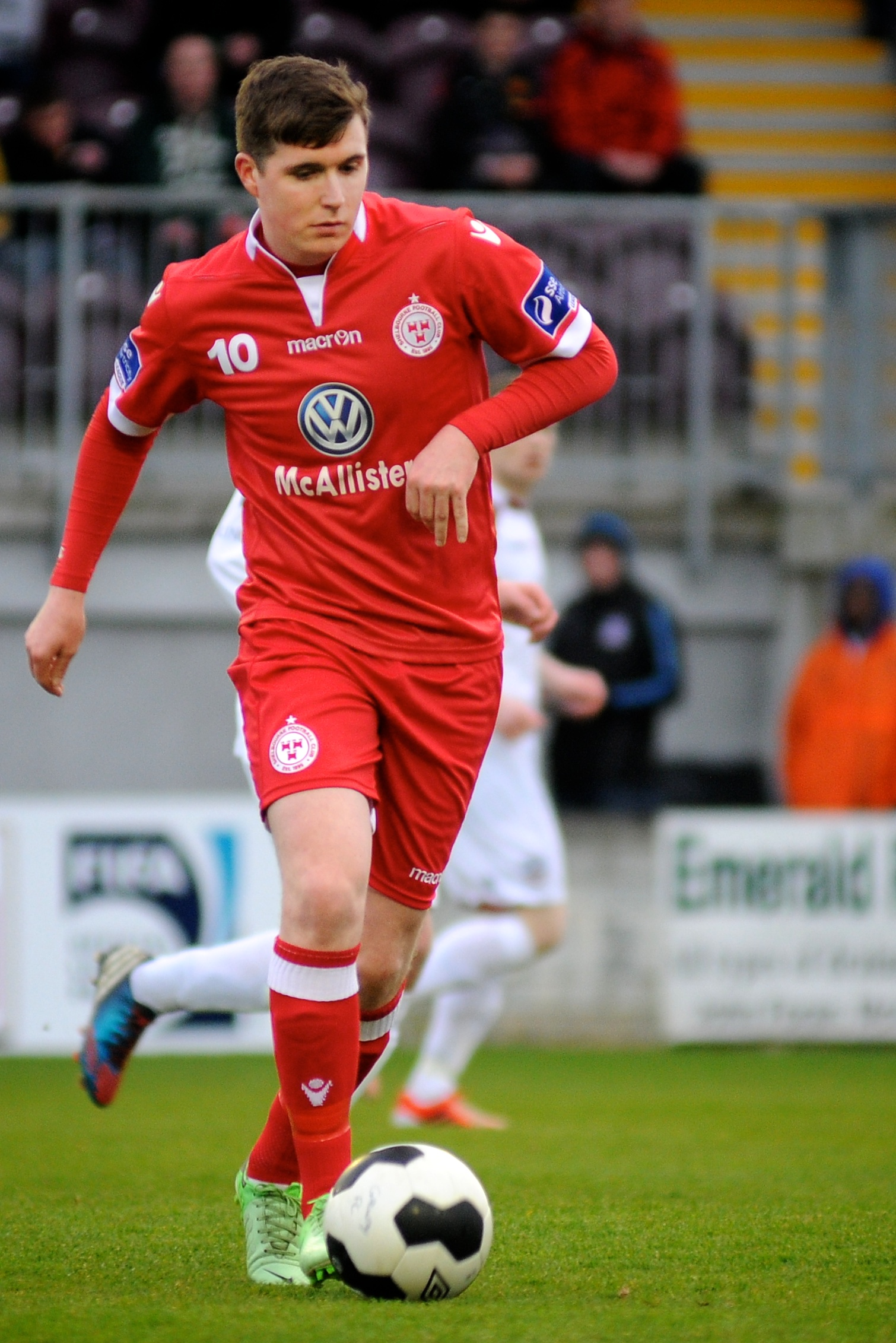
- Jordan Keegan in action for Shelbourne in 2014

Personal information
- Full name: Jordan Keegan
- Date of birth: 5 February 1992 (age 34)
- Place of birth: Dublin, Ireland
- Position: Forward

Youth career
- –2011: Southampton
- 2011: St Patrick's Athletic

Senior career*
| Years | Team | Apps | (Gls) |
| 2011 | St Patrick's Athletic | 7 | (1) |
| 2011–2012 | Monaghan United | 25 | (7) |
| 2012–2013 | Scunthorpe United | 3 | (0) |
| 2013 | St Patrick's Athletic | 2 | (0) |
| 2013 | Dundalk | 6 | (0) |
| 2014–2015 | Shelbourne | 26 | (4) |
- * Club domestic league appearances and goals as of 00:52, 16 January 2024 (UTC)

Jordan Keegan is an Irish former footballer who played as a forward.

== Playing career ==
Keegan played with League of Ireland side St Patrick's Athletic. He then moved on to Monaghan United, until the club folded in June 2012.

He signed with English League One side Scunthorpe United in August 2012. He made his debut on 21 August, in a 2–1 defeat to Crewe Alexandra at Glanford Park; he was an 87th-minute substitute for Josh Walker.

== Statistics ==
| Season | Club | Division | League | | FA Cup | | League Cup | | Other | | Total | |
| Season | Club | Division | Apps | Goals | Apps | Goals | Apps | Goals | Apps | Goals | Apps | Goals |
|---|---|---|---|---|---|---|---|---|---|---|---|---|
| 2012–13 | Scunthorpe United | League One | 1 | 0 | 0 | 0 | 0 | 0 | 0 | 0 | 1 | 0 |
| Total | | | 1 | 0 | 0 | 0 | 0 | 0 | 0 | 0 | 1 | 0 |
