= Anthony Flood =

Irish footballer

Personal information
- Date of birth: 31 December 1984 (age 41)
- Place of birth: Dublin, Ireland
- Position: Forward

Youth career
- Sheriff United
- Mullingar Town

Senior career*
| Years | Team | Apps | (Gls) |
| 2005–2006 | St Patrick's Athletic | 5 | (0) |
| 2005 | → Athlone Town (loan) | 14 | (7) |
| 2006 | → Shamrock Rovers (loan) | 9 | (3) |
| 2007 | Dundalk | 9 | (2) |
| 2007–2009 | Shelbourne | 76 | (37) |
| 2010 | Galway United | 16 | (7) |
| 2010 | Örebro SK | 3 | (0) |
| 2011 | Bohemians | 33 | (8) |
| 2012 | Southend United | 1 | (0) |
| 2012–2013 | St Patrick's Athletic | 35 | (11) |
| 2014–2015 | Dunbar Rovers | 14 | (36) |
| 2015–2016 | Marconi Stallions | ? | (?) |
| 2017 | Bray Wanderers | 15 | (3) |
- * Club domestic league appearances and goals as of 08:05, 11 March 2017 (UTC)

Anthony Flood (born 31 December 1984) is an Irish retired footballer who played as a striker.

== Career ==
=== St. Patrick's Athletic ===
After raising eyebrows at youth level, Anto began his top-flight career by signing for St. Patrick's Athletic in 2005. With regular first team opportunities limited at the Inchicore side, Flood was imminently loaned out for the majority of the 2005 season to First Division Athlone Town in order to gain valuable experience.

Flood returned to the Saints at the beginning of the 2006 season but found himself back in a similar situation. First team opportunities were again limited and he was eventually loaned out by Pats again, this time to Dublin rivals Shamrock Rovers in July 2006. Anto scored 3 league goals in 9 league appearances in the 2006 season including the opening goal in Rovers 1000th League win.

=== Dundalk ===
After spending effectively two seasons on loan from St. Patrick's Athletic, Anto departed the Saints in December 2006 to sign for First Division Dundalk. Flood made a bright start to his Dundalk career becoming a regular in the side and scored his first Dundalk goal in 6–2 victory against Athlone Town on 29 March 2007 at Oriel Park. Things took a sharp turn for the worse for Flood's Dundalk career in May 2007 when his contract was terminated by the club due to a "breach of discipline".

=== Shelbourne ===
As a free agent, Flood remained out of the game for two months until the next transfer window in July 2007 when he was snapped up by First Division side, Shelbourne, in order to boost their attacking options. He made his Shelbourne debut against Wexford Youths at Tolka Park on 6 July 2007. Anto ironically scored his first goal for Shelbourne against the club that had dismissed him a few short months previously, scoring the winner in a 1–0 victory over Dundalk at Tolka Park on 27 July 2007. He ended up scoring 11 goals for the Reds during the 2007 season, and the 2 goals he scored earlier in the season with Dundalk ensured he was tied with Davin O'Neill of Cobh Ramblers for the second top scorer in the First Division. Flood was one of just four Shelbourne first-team players who played in 2007 to be retained for the following season. A prolific start to the 2008 season saw Flood hit the top of the goal-scoring charts, while Shels reached the top of the First Division table. Both Shels and Flood could not maintain this form consistently over the course of the season as Shels were pipped to the title in the dying seconds of the season by Dundalk. Flood finished 2nd in the 2008 First Division goal-scoring charts with 14 goals. He returned to Shelbourne for their latest assault on the First Division title in 2009 where he scored 12 goals that season. After Shelbourne failed to achieve promotion with a second-place finish in 2009, Flood parted ways with the club after three seasons where he scored 38 goals in 83 competitive appearances.

=== Galway United ===
Galway United announced on 18 March 2010 that they had signed Flood. On 8 July 2010, Flood was offered a contract at St Mirren on trial with a view to signing along with teammate Stephen O'Donnell but turned it down to join Örebro SK.

=== Örebro SK ===
With not joining St Mirren, Flood was told that there was a club in the Swedish top division of Allsvenskan that wanted him for a trial. On 28 July 2010, Flood joined Örebro SK on trial. The club were searching for a new center forward since the departure of the Danish striker Kim Olsen. On 30 July, the club announced that they had signed Flood on a short-term contract until the end of the year.

=== Bohemians ===
Flood signed for Bohs in February 2011 just in time for the new season. He scored his first goal for the club on his League debut against Bray Wanderers on 4 March 2011 in the Carlisle Grounds. Flood followed this good start by scoring the winner the following week against Drogheda United Flood was a free agent at the end of the season.

=== Southend United ===
On 13 January, Flood signed a contract with Southend United until the end of the season, having impressed manager Paul Sturrock in a trial game earlier in the month. He was selected as a substitute for the game against Morcambe and made his first and only appearance for Southend as a 90th-minute substitute against Burton Albion. On 18 May 2012, Flood was one of 11 players to be released at the end of their contract.

=== Return to St. Patrick's Athletic ===
Flood announced that he had rejoined his first professional club, St Patrick's Athletic, via his Twitter account. He was included in the Saints squad for the 2012–13 UEFA Europa League campaign, with the first round tie against Íþróttabandalag Vestmannaeyja from Iceland. Flood made his debut in the 86th minute in the home leg and did well, holding up the ball to run down the clock to secure the 1–0 win. Flood's league debut for the club came against arch rivals Shamrock Rovers in a Dublin derby that ended all square (1–1).

=== Move to Australia ===
Flood joined ESFA Premier League side, Dunbar Rovers in March 2014 to play alongside former League of Ireland players, Clive Delaney (Derry City), Thomas Crawley (Derry City) and Craig Mooney (Shelbourne). He made his debut in the Waratah Cup where he scored a hat-trick against Parramatta City in a 5–1 win.

Flood signed for the Marconi Stallions in 2015.

=== Bray Wanderers ===
Flood returned to Ireland from Australia in December 2016, and on 7 January 2017 it was announced that he had signed for Bray Wanderers for the 2017 season.

== Honours ==
=== Club ===
- League of Ireland (1):
  - St Patrick's Athletic – 2013

=== Individual ===
- League of Ireland Player of the Month (1):
  - St Patrick's Athletic – September 2013
