= Patrick Sullivan (footballer) =

Irish footballer

Pat Sullivan
Personal information
- Date of birth: 30 October 1982 (age 44)
- Place of birth: Dublin, Ireland
- Position: Right back

Youth career
- 2001: Leicester Celtic
- 2002: Shamrock Rovers

Senior career*
Years	Team	Apps	(Gls)
2002–2004	UCD	95	(3)
2005–2006	Drogheda United	6	(0)
2007	Longford Town	28	(2)
2008–2009	Cork City	41	(2)
2009–2011	Shamrock Rovers	63	(3)
2012	Southern Stars	5	(0)
2012–2013	Shamrock Rovers	46	(0)
2014–2015	Longford Town	51	(1)
- * Club domestic league appearances and goals

Patrick Sullivan (born 30 October 1982) is an Irish retired footballer who played as a defender.

== Career ==
Sullivan started his League of Ireland career at University College Dublin after joining from Leicester Celtic where he was a member of the under 15 SFAI All Ireland Cup winning team. He played with Shamrock Rovers Schoolboy Team and was a member of the DDSL Academy of Excellence where he played for their Schoolboy selection against Northern Ireland.

Sullivan made his League of Ireland debut as a substitute against Derry City on 23 August 2002 at Belfield Park. Sullivan attended the college on a sports scholarship and studied Sports Management whilst playing League of Ireland football, scoring his first ever goal on 20 September, the winner in UCD's 1–0 victory over St. Pat's.

He moved to right back because of injuries in the squad and it proved to be his best position. UCD were relegated in 2003 and promoted from the First Division in second place a year later. He scored 3 goals in 95 league appearances over three seasons with the Students and was on the scoresheet in their 5–0 win over Drumcondra in the 2004 FAI Cup Second Round. In October 2004 Sullivan's only goal of the season sealed promotion in Cobh.

Sullivan signed for Drogheda United in 2005 during a successful period for the club but he was plagued by injuries, only playing 6 league games. He resurrected his career at Longford, scoring twice in 28 starts in 2007. The Town were relegated that year but did reach the FAI Cup Final under Alan Mathews, losing 1–0 to Cork City on 2 December at the RDS.

Already on a booking for dissent, Sullivan was sent off late on for a reckless challenge on Leon McSweeney to earn his second yellow of the afternoon.

After Longford's relegation at the end of the 2007 season, Patrick moved South to link up with his former manager Alan Mathews, who had taken the reins at Cork City. That season, Cork City ran into financial difficulties and were forced into examinership. However, the club emerged from the examinership period and went on to clinch the Setanta Cup at the end of the season.

Sullivan was released by Cork City and he signed for Shamrock Rovers on 31 July 2009, on a two-and-a-half-year contract.

He made his Rovers debut in the 2–1 win over Derry City at Tallaght Stadium on 2 August and made 63 (3) appearances in all competitions over three seasons, with 3 goals, 9 assists (all in 2011), 23 yellow cards and three sending offs.

He scored his first goal for the Hoops against his old club in October 2009.

In March 2010 he scored the winner at Terryland Park but his season was over as he badly injured his knee.

On 25 August 2011 Patrick scored arguably the most important goal of his life when he equalised with a spectacular volley at Partizan Belgrade in the UEFA Europa League play-off round. His goal ensured Shamrock Rovers went into extra-time in where they won 2–1, thus becoming the first Irish side to qualify for the group stages of European competition. The goal was shown on sports bulletins all around the globe and was even named as 'High Performance Moment of the Day' on Fox Sports in the USA.

For his historic goal Sullivan was awarded the SWAI Player of the Month for August 2011.

Sullivan was awarded the 2011 Airtricity Player of the Year in February 2012.

He then followed former assistant manager Jim Magilton down under, travelling to Australia and briefly playing for Victorian Premier League club Southern Stars.

Sullivan returned to The Hoops in June 2012.

Following a disappointing 2013 season in Tallaght under Trevor Croly, Sullivan decided to return to Longford Town for the 2014 season. He signed on 15 January 2014, and played a major role in helping 'De Town' win their first League of Ireland First Division and achieve promotion back to the Premier Division in his debut season. He was a key figure as the midland's club finished in a very credible 6th place at the end of the 2015 League of Ireland Premier Division season. He retired at the end of the season. During his final game, and on the day of his 33rd birthday, Sullivan scored the only goal of his second stint with the Town when netting from the penalty spot against Derry City.

== Honours ==
Shamrock Rovers

- League of Ireland (2): 2010, 2011
- Setanta Sports Cup (2): 2011, 2013
- Leinster Senior Cup (1): 2013

Drogheda United

- FAI Cup (1): 2005
- Setanta Sports Cup (2): 2006

Longford Town

- League of Ireland First Division (1): 2014

Cork City

- Setanta Sports Cup (1): 2008
