= Sleep–wake activity inventory =

Sleep questionnaire

The sleep–wake activity inventory (SWAI) is a subjective multidimensional questionnaire intended to measure sleepiness.

== The instrument ==
The SWAI consists of 59 items that provide six subscale scores: excessive daytime sleepiness, nocturnal sleep, ability to relax, energy level, social desirability, and psychic distress. Each item is rated on a 1 to 9 semicontinuous Likert type scale from "always" to "never", based on the previous seven days. The SWAI was normed on 554 subjects in the early 1990s and is currently being validated or has been validated in multiple languages, including Spanish, French and Dutch.

For the excessive daytime sleepiness subscale (SWAI-EDS), a score of 40 or below indicates excessive sleepiness, a score of between 40 and 50 indicates possible sleepiness and a score of greater than 50 is normal.

A short form of the SWAI exists that contains items for the excessive daytime sleepiness and nocturnal sleep subscales only.

== Comparison with other sleepiness assessments ==
The SWAI has been compared to the multiple sleep latency test (MSLT), which is an objective measure that is considered the gold standard of sleepiness assessment; it measures sleep onset latency during several daytime opportunities. The SWAI-EDS has been found to correlate moderately to highly with average MSLT scores.

Other sleepiness scales, including the Stanford sleepiness scale and the Epworth sleepiness scale (ESS), exist. However, the ESS does not correlate as highly with the MSLT as the SWAI. The ESS is currently the most prevalent measure of excessive sleepiness.

== History ==
The SWAI was developed by Drs. Leon Rosenthal, Timothy Roehrs and Tom Roth at the Sleep Disorders and Research Center at the Henry Ford Hospital in Detroit, Michigan.
