= Jake Kelly (footballer, born 1990) =

English footballer

Personal information
- Date of birth: 18 June 1990 (age 36)
- Place of birth: Dublin, Ireland
- Position: Winger

Team information
- Current team: St. Patrick's CYFC

Senior career*
Years	Team	Apps	(Gls)
2008–2011	Bray Wanderers	104	(26)
2012–2013	St Patrick's Athletic	42	(8)
2014	Bray Wanderers	22	(5)
2015	Dundalk	8	(2)
2015–2016	Bohemians	32	(8)
2017	Longford Town	21	(2)
2018	Bray Wanderers	15	(1)
2019	Ballybrack FC		
2020–	St. Patrick's CYFC		
- * Club domestic league appearances and goals

Jake Kelly (born 18 June 1990) is a footballer who plays for St. Patrick's CYFC.

== Club career ==
Kelly made his debut for Bray Wanderers on 18 August 2008 in an FAI Cup replay against Dundalk in which he scored in a 3–1 victory. He made a further 12 appearances during the season.

In 2009, Kelly cemented his place in the team and scored 26 goals in 90 league appearances over the next three seasons before he left to join St Patrick's Athletic for the 2012 season.

Kelly signed for St Patrick's Athletic in February 2012. He was shown a straight red card in his league debut against his old club Bray Wanderers following a clash with Dane Massey. Kelly provided a wonderful assist for Christy Fagan to make it 5–1 against rivals Shamrock Rovers at Richmond Park

Following his release from St. Pats, Kelly had short spells at Bray and Dundalk.

Having previously worked with Bohemians manager Keith Long at Bray Wanderers, Kelly joined Bohemians midway through the 2015 season. He left Bohs at the end of 2016 before joining Longford Town for the 2017 season.

On 5 January 2018, Bray Wanderers announced the signing of Kelly. On 17 August Kelly scored his first goal of his 3rd spell with Bray in a 3–1 defeat to Dundalk.

== Honours ==
St Patrick's Athletic

- League of Ireland (1): 2013

Bohemians

- Leinster Senior Cup (1): 2015-2016
