= Liam Buckley =

Irish former professional football (born 1960)

Personal information
- Date of birth: 14 April 1960 (age 66)
- Place of birth: Dublin, Ireland
- Position: Forward

Senior career*
Years	Team	Apps	(Gls)
1978–1979	Shelbourne	32	(8)
1979–1981	Shamrock Rovers	52	(20)
1981	Vancouver Whitecaps	8	(2)
1981–1984	Shamrock Rovers	74	(46)
1984–1986	K.S.V. Waregem	25	(5)
1986–1987	Racing de Santander	35	(5)
1987–1989	FC Montreux-Sports	?	(5)
1989–1992	Shamrock Rovers	13	(1)
1992–1997	St Patrick's Athletic	55	(11)
1997	Sligo Rovers	5	(0)
1997–1998	Athlone Town	?	(?)

International career
1979–1984	League of Ireland XI	4	(0)
1981	Republic of Ireland U21	1	(0)
1984	Republic of Ireland	2	(0)

Managerial career
- 1997–1998: Athlone Town
- 1998–1999: St Patrick's Athletic
- 2000–2002: Athlone Town
- 2002–2004: Shamrock Rovers
- 2008–2010: Sporting Fingal
- 2012–2018: St Patrick's Athletic
- 2018–2022: Sligo Rovers
- 2023: Cork City (sporting director)
- 2023: Cork City (interim manager)
- * Club domestic league appearances and goals

Liam Buckley (born 14 April 1960), is an Irish former professional footballer and manager. During his playing career he made two appearances for the Republic of Ireland national team.

== Playing career ==
Buckley began his League of Ireland career with Shelbourne and signed for Shamrock Rovers as a full-time player in the 1979 close season. He scored his first goal for the Hoops against his former club at Milltown on 21 October 1979 and he went on to score another seven league goals that season.

On 30 April 1980 he represented the League of Ireland against Argentina at the River Plate Stadium where Diego Maradona scored in a 1–0 defeat.

Buckley played for the Republic of Ireland national under-21 football team in 1981.

Following a spell with Vancouver Whitecaps in the 1981/82 season he finished as Rovers' top scorer with 21 goals and had a trial at Hannover 96. While the following season was a disappointment he still ended up as top goalscorer at Milltown and guested for St Patrick's Athletic in a friendly with Manchester United.

In April 1983 he played for the League of Ireland XI U21s against their Italian League counterparts who included Roberto Mancini and Gianluca Vialli in their team.

The 1983–84 season ended in triumph as Rovers won their first League title in twenty years. Buckley had scored 13 League goals before he broke his collar-bone against Waterford at Milltown on 26 February. However, he returned to action less than six weeks later to score the winner in the FAI Cup semi final replay against Shelbourne.

He made five appearances in European competition for the Hoops.

Buckley was capped at full international level against Poland and in July was transferred to Belgian club K.S.V. Waregem (4451). While there he gained his second international cap against Mexico. With Waregem he reached the semi-finals of the 1985–86 UEFA Cup. He made 25 league appearances, scoring five goals.

He was transferred to Racing de Santander on loan for the 1986–87 season and made his debut at the Camp Nou on 30 August. It's a game he fondly remembers: "Gary Lineker and Mark Hughes were making their debut for FC Barcelona and there I was making my debut for Santander. There was a crowd of around ninety thousand and the atmosphere was tremendous and although they beat us 2–0 I think that occasion is the highlight of my career". He later moved to FC Montreux-Sports (November 1987–89) where he spent two seasons.

He came home and signed for Rovers again in 1989 but injuries prevented him from establishing a regular first team place. In his final season in the Hoops in 1991–92 he scored once in eleven appearances.

He then transferred to St. Patrick's Athletic where he went on to win the League in 1996 as an assistant coach. After a decade at Richmond Park, manager Brian Kerr left in December 1996 to take up the position of technical director at the Football Association of Ireland. Buckley wasn't offered the managers job at Pats and he left the club in February 1997 to move to Sligo for the rest of that season and later went on to become player-manager at Athlone Town.

== Managerial career ==
Buckley guided Athlone to the FAI Cup semi final in 1998 in his first season as player-manager.

After guiding St. Pat's to the League in 1998 Pat Dolan stepped down after one game of the 1998/99 season and appointed Buckley as manager. Pats retained their league title but two bad defeats in Europe followed by indifferent domestic form saw Buckley sacked in December 1999.

He then had another spell as Athlone's manager before being appointed Shamrock Rovers manager in April 2002.

In his first season, he guided Rovers to the FAI Cup Final and 3rd spot thus ensuring European football again after the UEFA Cup losses to Djurgårdens IF.

Famous wins over Odra Wodzisław saw Rovers become the first Irish side to win home and away since he himself had played and scored against Fram Reykjavik in 1982.

However Rovers form dropped alarmingly after the UEFA Intertoto Cup games and a seventh-place finish had the fans worried. In the 2004 season with practically a new team Rovers again struggled and Buckley was sacked in September 2004.

In 2008 Buckley took on the role of manager of Sporting Fingal a brand new team that were awarded a licence to play in the League of Ireland First Division. They finished a creditable 3rd in their first season in senior football. In their second season in 2009, Buckley guided Fingal to promotion through the play-offs, and capped off a superb campaign by also winning the FAI Cup.

In January 2010 he was awarded the SWAI Personality of the Year.

Buckley was appointed St.Patrick's Athletic manager for the 2012 season on 2 December 2011. In his first season back at the club, with his side playing some of the best football the club had seen since his own playing days at the club, he guided the Saints to 3rd place in the League of Ireland (only six points off 1st place), Runners-Up in the FAI Cup and through two rounds in the UEFA Europa League to make it to the Third Qualifying Round (knocked out by German giants Hannover 96).

In September 2018 Liam Buckley resigned from St.Patrick's Athletic after a 3–1 loss to Bohemians.

He took over as manager of Sligo Rovers in October 2018. Buckley left the club by mutual consent on 22 May 2022 after securing qualification to European football in back to back seasons in his final 2 years at the club. In total he took charge of 118 games with the club.

On 3 May 2023, Buckley was named as sporting director of Cork City, with his role focusing primarily on player recruitment, along with supporting management on all football related matters. With manager Colin Healy stepping down on the same day as Buckley's appointment, he took interim charge of the club while the club searched for a new manager, while he ruled out himself taking up the position on a permanent basis. On 28 September 2023, it was announced that Buckley would step back from the interim manager role in order to step back to his Sporting Director role, with Richie Holland taking over as manager on an interim basis. On 24 November 2023, it was announced he had left his role as Sporting Director following the club's relegation to the League of Ireland First Division.

== Managerial statistics ==
Competitive games only – correct as of 28 September 2023.

Managerial record by team and tenure
Team	From	To	Record							
Team	From	To	G	W	D	L	GF	GA	GD	Win %
Athlone Town	1997	1998	0	0	0	0	0	0	+0	—
St Patrick's Athletic	1998	December 1999	0	0	0	0	0	0	+0	—
Athlone Town	2000	2002	0	0	0	0	0	0	+0	—
Shamrock Rovers	25 April 2002	7 September 2004	0	0	0	0	0	0	+0	—
Sporting Fingal	January 2008	9 February 2011	133	70	36	27	169	110	+59	52.63
St Patrick's Athletic	2 December 2011	25 September 2018	319	160	60	99	511	355	+156	50.16
Sligo Rovers	26 October 2018	22 May 2022	118	44	28	46	145	137	+8	37.29
Cork City (interim)	3 May 2023	28 September 2023	22	8	3	11	26	34	−8	36.36

== Honours ==
=== As a player ===
- League of Ireland: 2
  - Shamrock Rovers – 1983–84
  - St Patrick's Athletic – 1995–96
- Leinster Senior Cup
  - Shamrock Rovers – 1982
- Dublin City Cup
  - Shamrock Rovers – 1983–84
- Shamrock Rovers Player of the Year: 2
  - Shamrock Rovers – 1981–82, 1982–83

=== As a manager ===
- League of Ireland Premier Division: 2
  - St Patrick's Athletic – 1998–99
  - St Patrick's Athletic – 2013
- FAI Cup: 2
  - Sporting Fingal – 2009
  - St Patrick's Athletic – 2014
- League of Ireland Cup: 2
  - St Patrick's Athletic – 2015
  - St Patrick's Athletic – 2016
- FAI President's Cup: 1
  - St Patrick's Athletic – 2014
- Leinster Senior Cup: 1
  - St Patrick's Athletic – 2014
- SWAI Personality of the Year: 2
  - Sporting Fingal – 2009
  - St Patrick's Athletic – 2013
- Phillips Sports Manager of the Month: 1
  - St Patrick's Athletic – October 2013

Preceded by Pete Mahon	St Patrick's Athletic manager 1998–1999	Succeeded by Pat Dolan

Preceded by Pete Mahon	St Patrick's Athletic manager 2012 – 2018	Succeeded by Harry Kenny
