= Danny O'Connor (footballer) =

Irish footballer (born 1980)

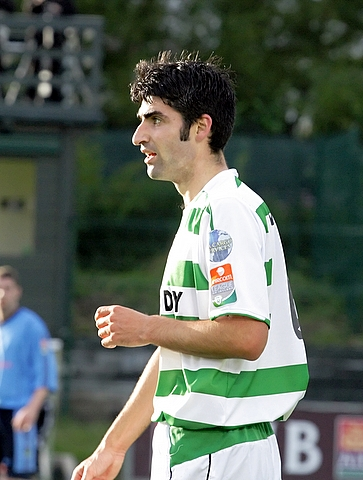
- O'Connor in action for Shamrock Rovers

Personal information
- Full name: Daniel O'Connor
- Date of birth: 28 September 1980 (age 46)
- Place of birth: Dublin, Ireland
- Height: 1.88 m (6 ft 2 in)
- Positions: Centre back; midfielder

Senior career*
Years	Team	Apps	(Gls)
1999–2001	Bray Wanderers	9	(0)
2001–2005	Drogheda United	123	(8)
2005–2006	Longford Town	58	(2)
2007–2008	Shamrock Rovers	54	(1)
2009–2010	Newry City	11	(0)
2010–2014	Bray Wanderers	57	(8)
- * Club domestic league appearances and goals

Danny O'Connor (born 28 September 1980, Dublin) is an Irish footballer who retired in June 2014 as Club Captain of Bray Wanderers. O'Connor primarily played as a central defender or in central midfield. His brothers James O'Connor and Kevin O'Connor also had extensive footballing careers.

Danny started his League of Ireland career at Bray Wanderers in 1999 and spent two seasons at the Carlisle Grounds before moving to Drogheda United at the start of the 2001/02 season. Danny made 123 league appearances in four seasons at United Park and scored eight goals. His most memorable goal was on 8 February 2003 when he scored the winning goal in the relegation playoff against Galway United to keep Drogheda in the top division. His extra time goal at United Park was Drogheda's third of the match, which overturned the 2–0 defeat they had suffered in the first leg.

In January 2005 Danny signed for Longford Town and spent two seasons at Flancare Park, making 58 league appearances and scoring two league goals. He also scored against Cork City in the second round of the FAI Cup in 2006, though Longford went out of the competition at the quarter-final stage to St Patrick's Athletic.

O'Connor departed Longford Town at the end of the 2006 season to join newly promoted Shamrock Rovers. He made his Rovers debut at UCD on the opening day of the 2007 season. O'Connor scored his only Rovers goal in a 2-0 derby victory over Bohemians in September that year. He departed Shamrock Rovers at the end of the 2008 season and following a brief spell out of the game he joined IFA Premiership side Newry City for the 2009/10 season.

Danny left Rovers at the end of the 2008 season and spent some time out of the game before joining Irish League side Newry City F.C. at the start of the 2009/10 season. He made 11 league appearances with Newry but in July 2010 O'Connor returned to Bray Wanderers. He was appointed Club Captain there, but following a series of injuries he retired from football in June 2014.
