= 2011 Shamrock Rovers F.C. season =

Shamrock Rovers F.C.
2011 season
- Chairman: Jonathan Roche
- Manager: Michael O'Neill
- Stadium: Tallaght Stadium
- League of Ireland: Champions
- FAI Cup: Quarter-finals
- League of Ireland Cup: Second Round
- Leinster Senior Cup: Quarter-finals
- Setanta Sports Cup: Champions
- Champions League: Third qualifying round
- Europa League: Group stages
- Top goalscorer: League: Gary Twigg (15); All: Billy Dennehy (16)
- Highest home attendance: 8,500 (15 December vs Tottenham Hotspur, Europa League)
- Lowest home attendance: 785 (22 March vs Lisburn Distillery, Setanta Sports Cup)
- Average home league attendance: 4,032
Home colours	Away colours	Third colours

The 2011 Shamrock Rovers F.C. season was the club's 90th season competing in the League of Ireland and their 5th consecutive season in the top-flight of Irish football. It was also their most successful season in their history. Rovers played a record number of 56 games in the whole 2011 season.

Shamrock Rovers began the season with a 2–0 win over Dundalk in the Leinster Senior Cup at Oriel Park on 22 February. Their first league game, at home, also against Dundalk, ended in a 3–1 win. Rovers were defending League of Ireland champions and in 2011 won the club's 17th league title, becoming champions after a 2–1 win away at UCD. Rovers finished four points ahead of nearest rivals Sligo Rovers.

Furthermore, Shamrock Rovers competed in the Champions League for the first time in the club's history. After beating Flora Tallinn Rovers were knocked out by FC Copenhagen, and entered the Europa League qualifiers. They defeated Partizan Belgrade to qualify for the group stages, the first Irish club to do so. They played in a group with Rubin Kazan, PAOK and Tottenham Hotspur.

Shamrock Rovers also won the All-Ireland tournament, the Setanta Sports Cup, beating Dundalk in the final at Tallaght. But they went out of the FAI Cup to Sligo Rovers in the quarter-final and the League of Ireland Cup to St Patrick's Athletic. Rovers entered the domestic tournaments in the Third and Second Round as a result of being a League of Ireland club.

== Squad ==
Note: Flags indicate national team as defined under FIFA eligibility rules; some limited exceptions apply. Players may hold more than one non-FIFA nationality.

No.	Pos.	Nation	Player
1	GK	ENG	Richard Brush
2	DF	IRL	Patrick Sullivan
3	DF	IRL	Enda Stevens
4	DF	SCO	Craig Sives
5	DF	ENG	Dan Murray (Captain)
6	MF	IRL	Stephen Rice
7	MF	IRL	Gary McCabe
8	MF	IRL	Stephen O'Donnell
9	FW	SCO	Gary Twigg
10	FW	IRL	Karl Sheppard
11	FW	IRL	Ciarán Kilduff
13	DF	IRL	Pat Flynn
14	FW	IRL	Dean Kelly

No.	Pos.	Nation	Player
15	MF	IRL	Paddy Kavanagh
16	GK	JAM	Ryan Thompson
17	DF	IRL	Ken Oman
18	MF	NIR	Chris Turner
19	FW	IRL	Gary O'Neill
20	MF	IRL	Billy Dennehy
21	MF	IRL	Ronan Finn
22	MF	IRL	Conor McCormack
23	DF	IRL	Sean Gannon
24	MF	IRL	Karl Moore
25	GK	IRL	Craig Hyland
26	DF	SCO	Jim Paterson
27	MF	ENG	Rohan Ricketts

== Technical staff ==
Current Staff
- Manager: Michael O'Neill
- Assistant Manager/Coach: Jim Magilton
- Goalkeeping Coach: Tim Dalton
- Physiotherapist: Ferghal Kerin
- Club Sports Scientist: Padraic Phibbs
- Coaching Assistant: Andy Myler
- Head of Youth Development: Stephen Fennell

== Pre-season and friendlies ==
Shamrock Rovers began their pre-season on 1 February against non-league side, Killarney Celtic at Celtic Park. Surprisingly, Killarney Celtic started off positively with a goal in the opening ten minutes of the game. Killarney kept this lead until the 53rd minute when Ciarán Kilduff scored a goal to equalize. From then on Rovers began to get into the game. In the 77th minute, Anthony Murphy put Rovers into the lead with a terrific goal. Followed by this, Stephen O'Donnell and Karl Sheppard both scored with Billy Dennehy scoring twice on the 79th and 86th minute, resulting in the game ending 6–1 to Shamrock Rovers.

Rovers next pre-season game was against First Division side, Cork City on 4 February in Musgrave Park. Just like in the last game, Rovers conceded a goal in the 30th minute. But, Rovers fought back and just after the break, Gary McCabe scored a goal to level both sides. Then on the 75th minute, Patrick Kavanagh scored the winning goal, thus the game ended with Rovers winning 2–1.

Three days later, Rovers played against Celtic XI at Tallaght Stadium. This game was a highly anticipated game due to the high profile of Celtic. The game started off well for Rovers who did not concede a goal in the first half, like in the two previous games. But, in the 55th minute, Daryl Murphy fired past Alan Mannus to put Celtic in the lead. 3 minutes later, Graham Carey scored a goal to win the game for Celtic XI. This was Rovers first defeat this season.

On 13 February, Rovers played their next pre-season friendly against First Division side, Monaghan United in front of a crowd of just 400. Just before the break, Rovers were brought down to 10 men when Dean Kelly was sent off. Then, just 3 minutes before the end of the game, Conor McCormack was sent off. The game ended in a draw. A lot of chances for Rovers made the game very frustrating for Rovers. The man of the match was Dan Murray.

Two days later, Rovers played against IFA Premiership side, Cliftonville. In just under 1 minute, Gary Twigg opened the scoring for Rovers. This lead lasted until 15 minutes into the game, when Eamon Seydak put Cliftonville on level terms with Rovers. After the break, Rovers went on a goal frenzy, with goals from Ciarán Kilduff, Enda Stevens, Karl Sheppard and Gary McCabe to put Rovers ahead. Cliftonville got a consolation goal in the 85th minute to end the game in a 5–2 win to Rovers.

Win Draw Loss

1 February	Killarney Celtic	1–6	Shamrock Rovers	Celtic Park, Killarney
19:30 IST	Pa McGrath 10'	(Report)	Ciarán Kilduff 53'; Anthony Murphy 77'; Billy Dennehy 79', 86'; Stephen O'Donnell 89'; Karl Sheppard 91'

4 February	Cork City	1–2	Shamrock Rovers	Musgrave Park, Cork
19:45 IST	Vincent Escudé-Candau 30'	(Report)	Gary McCabe 46'; Patrick Kavanagh 75'

7 February	Shamrock Rovers	0–2	Celtic XI	Tallaght Stadium, Dublin
20:00 IST		(Report)	Daryl Murphy 55'; Graham Carey 58'	Referee: Damien Hancock

13 February	Shamrock Rovers	0–0	Monaghan United	Tallaght Stadium, Dublin
18:00 IST	Dean Kelly (red card) 47'; Conor McCormack (red card) 87'	(Report)		Attendance: 400; Referee: Richie Winter

15 February	Cliftonville	2–5	Shamrock Rovers	Solitude, Belfast
19:45 IST	Eamon Seydak 15'; Rory Donnelly 85'	(Report)	Gary Twigg 1'; Ciarán Kilduff 49'; Enda Stevens 55'; Karl Sheppard 68'; Gary McCabe 75'

18 February	Shelbourne	1–0	Shamrock Rovers	Tolka Park, Dublin
19:30 IST	Stephen Paisley 39'	(Report)		Referee: Damien Hancock

25 February	Shamrock Rovers	2–0	Waterford United	Tallaght Stadium, Dublin
20:00 IST	Gary McCabe 35'; Gary Twigg 49'	(Report)		Referee: Neil Doyle

23 November	Malmö FF	2–0	Shamrock Rovers	Swedbank Stadion, Malmö
19:00 IST	Hamad 42'; Nilsson 62'	(Report)

== Domestic competitions ==
=== League of Ireland ===
The fixtures for the 2011 season was announced on 23 December 2010, and revealed that Rovers would begin their league campaign against Dundalk at Tallaght Stadium on 4 March 2011.

All of the opening games for the League of Ireland started at the same time, so no team would get an early-head start in the title race. Dundalk started the game off positively with a goal in the 44th minute from Jason Byrne. But, two minutes later, Gary McCabe scored on his league debut for Rovers. In the second half, Shamrock Rovers dominated the game. In under 10 minutes, Rovers topscorer Gary Twigg scored twice to win the game for Shamrock Rovers. The 3–1 win put Rovers into third place in the league table at the end of the first round of league games.

Rovers next match came the following Saturday, away to Sligo Rovers. Shamrock Rovers started off well and in the 6th minute, Gary McCabe scored from a rebound against his former club. Shamrock Rovers remained dominant for the rest game and defended all that Sligo Rovers had to give. This win made it two out of two wins for Shamrock Rovers.

4 March Round 1	Shamrock Rovers	3–1	Dundalk	Tallaght Stadium, Dublin
19:35 IWT	Gary McCabe 45+2'; Gary Twigg 50' 55'	(Report)	Jason Byrne 44' (pen.)	Attendance: 5,263; Referee: Alan Kelly

12 March Round 2	Sligo Rovers	0–1	Shamrock Rovers	The Showgrounds, Sligo
19:45 IWT		(Report)	Gary McCabe 6'	Attendance: 4,200; Referee: Derek Tomney

18 March Round 3	Shamrock Rovers	2–0	St Patrick's Athletic	Tallaght Stadium, Dublin
20:00 IWT	Chris Turner 11'; Ken Oman 81'	(Report)		Attendance: 5,913; Referee: Tom Connolly

25 March Round 4	Derry City	0–0	Shamrock Rovers	Brandywell Stadium, Derry
19:45 IWT		(Report)		Referee: Richie Winter

1 April Round 5	Drogheda United	0–4	Shamrock Rovers	Hunky Dorys Park, Drogheda
19:45 IST		(Report)	Gary Twigg 28' 56'; Ciaran Kilduff 50'; Billy Dennehy 73'	Attendance: 1,000; Referee: Neil Doyle

8 April Round 6	Shamrock Rovers	0–1	Bray Wanderers	Tallaght Stadium, Dublin
20:00 IST		(Report)	Danny O'Connor 6'	Attendance: 2,500; Referee: Derek Tomney

15 April Round 7	Bohemians	1–1	Shamrock Rovers	Dalymount Park, Dublin
19:35 IST	Keith Buckley 72'	(Report)	Gary McCabe (red card) 80'; Ronan Finn 93'	Attendance: 3,100; Referee: Anthony Buttimer

22 April Round 8	Shamrock Rovers	3–1	UCD	Tallaght Stadium, Dublin
20:00 IST	Karl Sheppard 69'; Ronan Finn 73'; Billy Dennehy 83'	(Report)	Robbie Benson 82'	Attendance: 4,000; Referee: Neil Doyle

29 April Round 9	Galway United	0–1	Shamrock Rovers	Terryland Park, Galway
19:35 IST		(Report)	Karl Sheppard 7'	Attendance: 1,165; Referee: Paul Tuite

2 May Round 10	Dundalk	1–1	Shamrock Rovers	Oriel Park, Dundalk
14:00 IST	Jason Byrne 37'	(Report)	Karl Sheppard 16'	Attendance: 2,250; Referee: Derek Tomney

6 May Round 11	Shamrock Rovers	1–0	Sligo Rovers	Tallaght Stadium, Dublin
20:00 IST	Karl Sheppard 35'; Ken Oman (red card) 81'	(Report)		Attendance: 5,000; Referee: Anthony Buttimer

9 May Round 12	St Patrick's Athletic	0–0	Shamrock Rovers	Richmond Park, Dublin
20:05 IST		(Report)		Referee: Damien Hancock

13 May Round 13	Shamrock Rovers	postponed	Derry City	Tallaght Stadium, Dublin

20 May Round 14	Shamrock Rovers	3–0	Drogheda United	Tallaght Stadium, Dublin
20:00 IST	Craig Sives 49'; Gary Twigg 56' 61'	(Report)		Attendance: 2,500; Referee: Padraig Sutton

26 May Round 15	Bray Wanderers	1–0	Shamrock Rovers	Carlisle Grounds, Bray
19:45 IST	Jake Kelly 64'	(Report)		Attendance: 3,000; Referee: Anthony Buttimer

30 May Round 16	Shamrock Rovers	1–0	Bohemians	Tallaght Stadium, Dublin
20:05 IST	Karl Sheppard 42'	(Report)	Aidan Price (red card) 52'	Referee: Alan Kelly

10 June Round 17	UCD	1–6	Shamrock Rovers	UCD Bowl, Dublin
19:45 IST	Michael Leahy (red card) 43'; Darren Meenan 88'	(Report)	Gary Twigg 33' 41'; Karl Sheppard 51'; Billy Dennehy 77'; Ciarán Kilduff 87' 93'	Attendance: 1,225; Referee: Graham Kelly

13 June Round 13	Shamrock Rovers	1–1	Derry City	Tallaght Stadium, Dublin
20:00 IST	Gary McCabe 25'	(Report)	Éamon Zayed 64'	Attendance: 3,200; Referee: Richie Winter

17 June Round 18	Shamrock Rovers	4–0	Galway United	Tallaght Stadium, Dublin
20:00 IST	Stephen Rice 15'; Gary McCabe 48'; Gary Twigg 66'; Billy Dennehy 90'	(Report)		Attendance: 2,459; Referee: Padraig Sutton

21 June Round 19	Shamrock Rovers	2–2	Dundalk	Tallaght Stadium, Dublin
20:00 IST	Chris Turner 79'; Billy Dennehy 92'	(Report)	Mark Griffin 23' 60'	Attendance: 2,500; Referee: Alan Kelly

24 June Round 20	Sligo Rovers	2–0	Shamrock Rovers	The Showgrounds, Sligo
19:35 IST	Gavin Peers 38'; Eoin Doyle 91'	(Report)

3 July Round 21	Shamrock Rovers	1–0	St Patrick's Athletic	Tallaght Stadium, Dublin
14:00 IST	Gary Twigg 53'	(Report)		Referee: Dave McKeown

8 July Round 22	Derry City	1–0	Shamrock Rovers	Brandywell Stadium, Derry
19:35 IST	Daniel Lafferty 52'	(Report)		Attendance: 2,600; Referee: Damien Hancock

15 July Round 23	Drogheda United	0–1	Shamrock Rovers	Hunky Dorys Park, Drogheda
19:45 IST		(Report)	Gary Twigg 94'	Referee: Neil Doyle

22 July Round 24	Shamrock Rovers	postponed	Bray Wanderers	Tallaght Stadium, Dublin

5 August Round 25	Bohemians	0–1	Shamrock Rovers	Dalymount Park, Dublin
19:05 IST		(Report)	Gary Twigg 66'	Attendance: 2,784; Referee: Damien Hancock

12 August Round 26	Shamrock Rovers	6–0	UCD	Tallaght Stadium, Dublin
20:00 IST	Gary Twigg 62'; Dan Murray 65'; Billy Dennehy 67'; Gary O'Neill 69'; Ciarán Kilduff 84'; Thomas Boyle 92' (own goal)	(Report)		Attendance: 2,943; Referee: Paul Tuite

21 August Round 27	Galway United	2–3	Shamrock Rovers	Terryland Park, Galway
18:30 IST	Mikey Gilmore 33'; Eric Browne 46'	(Report)	Ronan Finn 16'; Craig Sives 51'; Ciarán Kilduff 57'	Referee: Alan Kelly

3 September Round 28	Dundalk	1–2	Shamrock Rovers	Oriel Park, Dundalk
17:30 IST	Mark Quigley 93'	(Report)	Billy Dennehy 58'; Stephen O'Donnell 74' (pen.)	Referee: Richie Winter

9 September Round 29	Shamrock Rovers	1–2	Sligo Rovers	Tallaght Stadium, Dublin
20:00 IWT	Pat Sullivan (yellow card) 62' (yellow-red card); Gary Twigg 62'; Pat Flynn (red card) 89'	(Report)	John Russell 80'; John Dillon 91'	Attendance: 4,000 approx. Referee: Damien Hancock

12 September Round 30	St Patrick's Athletic	1–1	Shamrock Rovers	Richmond Park, Dublin
20:00 IST	Stephen O'Donnell 19'	(Report)	Danny North 68'	Referee: Neil Doyle

23 September Round 31	Shamrock Rovers	postponed	Derry City	Tallaght Stadium, Dublin

25 September Round 24	Shamrock Rovers	5–2	Bray Wanderers	Tallaght Stadium, Dublin
15:00 IST	Gary McCabe 44'; Rohan Ricketts 49'; Gary McCabe 57'; Ronan Finn 68'; Gary Twigg 91'	(Report)	Jake Kelly 26'; Shane O'Connor (red card) 35'; Jake Kelly 92'	Attendance: 3,500 (est.); Referee: Richie Winter

2 October Round 32	Shamrock Rovers	4–0	Drogheda United	Tallaght Stadium, Dublin
14:00 IST	Karl Sheppard 23'; Ciarán Kilduff 41'; Billy Dennehy 70' (pen.); Gary O'Neill 81'	(Report)		Attendance: 2,500 (est.); Referee: Tom Connolly

5 October Round 33	Shamrock Rovers	1–1	Bohemians	Tallaght Stadium, Dublin
19:05 IST	Dan Murray 32'	(Report)	Aidan Downes (yellow card) 44' (yellow-red card); Glenn Cronin 60'	Attendance: 4,082; Referee: Derek Tomney

9 October Round 34	Bray Wanderers	1–2	Shamrock Rovers	Carlisle Grounds, Bray
19:45 IST	Gary Dempsey 64'	(Report)	Karl Sheppard 7' 89'	Attendance: 3,500 (est.); Referee: Dave McKeown

13 October Round 31	Shamrock Rovers	1–0	Derry City	Tallaght Stadium, Dublin
19:05 IST	Rohan Ricketts 50'	(Report)		Attendance: 3,500 (est.); Referee: Alan Kelly

25 October Round 35	UCD	1–2	Shamrock Rovers	UCD Bowl, Dublin
19:05 IST	Robbie Benson 71'; Darren Meenan (yellow card) 80' (yellow-red card)	(Report)	Ken Oman 68'; Craig Sives (yellow card) 47' (yellow-red card); Dean Kelly 94'	Attendance: 2,552; Referee: Neil Doyle

28 October Round 36	Shamrock Rovers	4–0	Galway United	Tallaght Stadium, Dublin
19:45 IST	Chris Turner 29'; Billy Dennehy 37'; Karl Sheppard 65'; Ronan Finn 83'	(Report)	Rory Gartlan (red card) 64'	Attendance: 5,200; Referee: Anthony Buttimer

==== League table ====
Pos	Team	Pld	W	D	L	GF	GA	GD	Pts	Qualification or relegation
1	Shamrock Rovers (C)	36	23	8	5	69	24	+45	77	Qualification for Champions League second qualifying round
2	Sligo Rovers	36	22	7	7	73	19	+54	73	Qualification for Europa League second qualifying round (Note: Sligo Rovers qualified for the UEFA Europa League second qualifying round after winning the 2011 FAI Cup Final.)
3	Derry City	36	18	14	4	63	23	+40	68	Banned from 2012–13 European competitions (Note: Derry City were banned from European competitions for three seasons after going into liquidation.)
4	St Patrick's Athletic	36	17	12	7	62	35	+27	63	Qualification for Europa League first qualifying round
5	Bohemians	36	17	9	10	39	27	+12	60	Qualification for Europa League first qualifying round

Rules for classification: 1) points; 2) goal difference; 3) number of goals scored.
(C) Champions

==== Results summary ====
Overall								Home						Away					
Pld	W	D	L	GF	GA	GD	Pts	W	D	L	GF	GA	GD	W	D	L	GF	GA	GD
36	23	8	5	69	24	+45	77	13	3	2	43	11	+32	10	5	3	26	13	+13

Last updated: 29 October 2011.
Source: extratime.ie

==== Results by round ====
Round	1	2	3	4	5	6	7	8	9	10	11	12	13	14	15	16	17	18	19	20	21	22	23	24	25	26	27	28	29	30	31	32	33	34	35	36
Ground	H	A	H	A	A	H	A	H	A	A	H	A	H	A	H	A	H	H	H	A	H	A	A	H	A	H	A	A	H	A	H	H	A	H	A	H
Result	W	W	W	D	W	L	D	W	W	D	W	D	D	W	L	W	W	W	D	L	W	L	W	W	W	W	W	W	L	D	W	D	W	W	W	W
Position	2	1	1	1	1	1	1	1	1	1	1	1	1	1	1	1	1	1	1	2	1	2	2	3	3	2	2	1	2	3	2	2	1	1	1	1

Updated to match(es) played on 29 October 2011. Source: 2011 League of Ireland
A = Away; H = Home; W = Win; D = Draw; L = Loss

=== FAI Cup ===
Shamrock Rovers, along with the other 20 League of Ireland clubs, entered the 2011 FAI Cup in the third round, the draw for which was made on 9 May 2011. Rovers were drawn at home with First Division side Athlone Town. Goals from Gary McCabe, Chris Turner, Dean Kelly and Billy Dennehy gave Rovers a 4–0 victory and ensured their place in the next round. A replay was required to determine the winner of the fourth round tie between Rovers and UCD after the first match ended in a 2–2 draw. Having played Partizan Belgrade away in the Europa League just 4 days previously, manager O'Neill decided to alter his starting line-up. After a goalless first half which contained chances for both sides, Rovers took the lead through Karl Sheppard in the 61st minute. Ciarán Kilduff doubled Rovers' advantage, but Samir Belhout pulled a goal back for the away side. Pat Flynn, Rovers' captain on the night, was then sent off in the 80th minute for a cynical block on a UCD player as the last man. UCD scored from the resulting free-kick to earn a replay at their home ground. The draw for the quarter-finals was made before the replay; the winner would face either Sligo Rovers or Monaghan United, who had also drawn their fourth round tie. The replay was a much more one-sided affair as Rovers won 6–0, with Billy Dennehy scoring a hat-trick.

Sligo Rovers also won their replay, so they were Rovers' opposition in the quarter-finals. Sligo, who would go on to win the tournament, knocked Rovers out of the competition by winning 1–0. Rovers had the best of the early stages. Karl Sheppard had two good opportunities to score, one of which was cleared off the line by Sligo defender Alan Keane after Sheppard had beaten the goalkeeper. Eoin Doyle scored Sligo's goal shortly afterwards. This was the only goal of the game, although Sligo's Richie Ryan hit the woodwork with a free-kick and both teams had penalty claims turned down.

3 June Third round	Shamrock Rovers	4–0	Athlone Town	Tallaght Stadium, Dublin
20:00 IST	Gary McCabe 12'; Chris Turner 46'; Dean Kelly 75'; Billy Dennehy 82'	(Report)		Attendance: 1,500; Referee: Tom Connolly

29 August Fourth round	Shamrock Rovers	2–2	UCD	Tallaght Stadium, Dublin
20:00 IST	Karl Sheppard 61'; Ciarán Kilduff 70'; Pat Flynn (red card) 80'	(Report)	Samir Belhout 74'; Robbie Creevy 81'	Attendance: 2,484; Referee: Tom Connolly

5 September Fourth round (replay)	UCD	0–6	Shamrock Rovers	UCD Bowl, Dublin
19:45 IST	Michael Leahy (red card) 25'	(Report)	Billy Dennehy 4', 41', 71'; Chris Turner 18'; Gary McCabe 25' (pen.); Gary O'Neill 91'	Attendance: 782; Referee: Dave McKeown

19 September Quarter-finals	Sligo Rovers	1–0	Shamrock Rovers	Showgrounds, Sligo
20:00 IST	Eoin Doyle 22'	(Report)		Attendance: 3,210; Referee: Alan Kelly

=== League of Ireland Cup ===
Shamrock Rovers, along with St Patrick's Athletic in Pool 3, received a bye to the second round of the 2011 League of Ireland Cup, the draw for which was made on 30 March 2011. Shamrock Rovers were given away tie against Dublin rivals St Patrick's Athletic.

The match, which was one of the most highly anticipated matches of the stage due to the rivalry of the 2 clubs, was played on 25 April. Rovers looked to have won the game through a Dean Kelly penalty in the 58th minute but St. Patrick's Athletic equalised with a penalty of their own in the 88th minute, scored by Danny North. The teams were forced to play into extra-time, in which neither side scored, thus forcing a penalty-shootout. Rovers only scored one penalty while St. Patrick's Athletic scored three of their four penalties to win the shoot-out and eliminate Rovers.

25 April Second round	St Patrick's Athletic	1–1 (a.e.t.) (3–1 p)	Shamrock Rovers	Richmond Park, Dublin
18:00 IST	Danny North 88'	(Report)	Dean Kelly 58'	Attendance: 1,293; Referee: Rob Rogers
	Penalties
	John Flood (penalty scored); Danny North (penalty missed); Stephen Bradley (penalty scored); Evan McMillan (penalty scored)		Conor McCormack (penalty scored); Colm Corcoran (penalty missed); Pat Flynn (penalty missed); Ciarán Kilduff (penalty missed)

=== Leinster Senior Cup ===
Shamrock Rovers began their campaign in the Leinster Senior Cup in the fourth round. In the draw for this round, which took place on 20 January, Rovers were paired with Dundalk. The match was played on 22 February at Oriel Park, before the start of the league season. Gary O'Neill scored the opening goal in the 35th minute to put Shamrock Rovers ahead. Dundalk had several opportunities to draw level in the second half, although the game finished 2–0 following Stephen O'Donnell's goal in the 78th minute.

Rovers were given an away tie against Bohemians in the quarter-finals. Bohemians had been due to play Sporting Fingal in the previous round, but received a bye as the opposition club was dissolved.

The highly anticipated match took place on 4 July at Dalymount Park. The first half was an entertaining battle between both sides and in the 43rd minute, Dean Kelly scored to put Rovers ahead. Early on in the second half, Ryan McEvoy scored to level the tie. After many good chances from both sides, the match was forced to enter into Extra time. In the 124th minute of extra time, Kevin Feely got a goal to put Bohemians ahead. This goal was enough to separate the sides and thus, eliminated Shamrock Rovers from the competition.

22 February Fourth round	Dundalk	0–2	Shamrock Rovers	Oriel Park, Dundalk
19:45 IST		(Report)	Gary O'Neill 35'; Stephen O'Donnell 78'	Attendance: 500; Referee: Rob Rogers

4 July Quarter-finals	Bohemians	2–1	Shamrock Rovers	Dalymount Park, Dublin
19:45 IST	Ryan McEvoy 68'; Kevin Feely 124'	(Report)	Dean Kelly 43'	Attendance: 800; Referee: Damian Hancock

== Setanta Sports Cup ==
Shamrock Rovers competed in the Setanta Cup for the first time this season. As winners of the 2010 League of Ireland, the club received a bye into the quarter-finals, where they played against IFA Premiership side Lisburn Distillery, who had overcome UCD in the first round. The first leg took place on 14 March at the New Grosvenor Stadium in Ballyskeagh. Rovers won the game 3–0 by virtue of goals from Karl Sheppard, Ciarán Kilduff and Dean Kelly. The second leg took place on 22 March and finished 4–2; Rovers progressed to the next round 7–2 on aggregate. Gary Liggett capitalised on Pat Flynn's mistake to give Lisburn an early lead before Kilduff equalised for Rovers. Sheppard had already had a shot cleared off the line before the equaliser. Rovers took the lead through Stephen Rice shortly after the restart only for Liggett to score again to level the game. However, 2 goals from Kavanagh in the final ten minutes ensured a victory for Rovers.

The draw for the semi-finals took place on 23 March in Belfast. Shamrock Rovers were drawn against either Portadown, of Northern Ireland, or Sligo Rovers, of the Republic of Ireland, who had yet to complete their quarter-final tie. Sligo Rovers went on to win the tie, prompting a rematch of the 2010 FAI Cup Final in which Sligo Rovers had defeated Shamrock Rovers on penalties. The first leg took place on 11 April at the Showgrounds, in Sligo. Ronan Finn's long-range goal and Karl Sheppard's header gave Rovers a 2–0 win over the home side, who had John Russell sent off 15 minutes after coming on as a substitute. The second leg took place on 19 April at Tallaght Stadium. Within three minutes, Sligo Rovers were back in the tie with a goal from Eoin Doyle. Their lead lasted only five minutes, however, as a goal from Karl Sheppard levelled the match. Ronan Finn then hit the post before providing the assist for Dennehy's 25th-minute goal which gave Rovers the lead. The game finished 2–1, giving Rovers a 4–1 aggregate victory and a place in their first Setanta Cup final.

It was also Rovers' opponents, fellow League of Ireland side Dundalk, first appearance in the final of the competition. They overcame Linfield, Glentoran and Cliftonville, all of Northern Ireland, to reach the final. The final took place at Tallaght Stadium on 14 May. Despite the game taking place in their home stadium, Rovers were technically the away team following the drawing of lots. Rovers won the final 2–0 and claimed their first piece of silverware this season. Gary O'Neill opened the scoring in the second half. Billy Dennehy scored in the 93rd minute to secure the title for Rovers.

14 March Quarter-finals (1st Leg)	Lisburn Distillery	0–3	Shamrock Rovers	New Grosvenor Stadium, Ballyskeagh
19:45 IST	Colm Cooling (red card) 78'	(Report)	Karl Sheppard 35'; Ciarán Kilduff 40'; Dean Kelly 68'

22 March Quarter-finals (2nd leg)	Shamrock Rovers	4–2	Lisburn Distillery	Tallaght Stadium, Dublin
19:45 IST	Ciaran Kilduff 42'; Stephen Rice 47'; Patrick Kavanagh 82', 89'	(Report)	Gary Liggett 14', 57'	Attendance: 785; Referee: Neil Doyle

Shamrock Rovers won 7–2 on aggregate

11 April Semi-finals (1st leg)	Sligo Rovers	0–2	Shamrock Rovers	Showgrounds, Sligo
19:45 IST	John Russell (red card) 74'	(Report)	Ronan Finn 27'; Karl Sheppard 58'

19 April Semi-finals (2nd leg)	Shamrock Rovers	2–1	Sligo Rovers	Tallaght Stadium, Dublin
19:45 IST	Karl Sheppard 8'; Billy Dennehy 25'	Report	Eoin Doyle 3'	Referee: Raymond Crangle

Shamrock Rovers won 4–1 on aggregate

14 May Final	Dundalk	0–2	Shamrock Rovers	Tallaght Stadium, Dublin
18:15 IST		(Report)	Gary O'Neill 65'; Billy Dennehy 90+3'	Attendance: 4,789; Referee: Alan Kelly, Cork

== European competitions ==
=== UEFA Champions League ===
Shamrock Rovers began their UEFA Champions League campaign in the second qualifying round after winning the 2010 League of Ireland. The draw for this round was made in Nyon, Switzerland on 20 June 2011. As one of the League Champions based in Western Europe, the club was seeded in Group 3. The draw paired Rovers with Estonian champions Flora Tallinn.

Rovers played the first leg on 12 July at Tallaght Stadium. The game ended 1–0 to Shamrock Rovers, which was a historic result as it was the first time Rovers had won a Champions League match. Chris Turner scored the winning goal in the 34th minute, just one minute after Flora Tallinn had missed a penalty. Rovers travelled to A. Le Coq Arena in Estonia for the second leg on 19 July. The game ended 0–0, which was enough for Rovers to progress to the next stage of the competition.

The draw for the third qualifying round took place on 15 July; as winners in the second qualifying round, they were placed in the "Champions Route" section. Rovers were drawn with Danish champions F.C. Copenhagen, who had appeared in the group stages of the competition the previous season. The first leg was played in Denmark, as determined by the draw, despite a request by Copenhagen to switch the order of the home and away legs. The game took place on 27 July and was broadcast live by Setanta Sports. Copenhagen went ahead after 4 minutes when Sölvi Ottesen beat Rovers' goalkeeper Ryan Thompson with a header. Both sides had scoring opportunities but the game finished 1–0.

The return leg was held on 2 August and was broadcast live on RTÉ Two. Copenhagen again opened the scoring, through Dame N'Doye, although Chris Turner had earlier hit the crossbar. They scored their second of the game, and third on aggregate, in the 73rd minute through Christian Bolaños. There were no further goals; Rovers' defeat consigned the club to the Europa League play-off round.

12 July Second qualifying round (1st Leg)	(Republic of Ireland) Shamrock Rovers	1–0	(Estonia) Flora Tallinn	Tallaght Stadium, Dublin
20:00 IST	Chris Turner 34'	(Report)		Attendance: 5,026; Referee: Jakob Kehlet (Denmark)

19 July Second qualifying round (2nd Leg)	(Estonia) Flora Tallinn	0–0	(Republic of Ireland) Shamrock Rovers	A. Le Coq Arena, Tallinn
16:45 IST		(Report)		Attendance: 2,970; Referee: Dimitar Meckarovski (Macedonia)

Shamrock Rovers won 1–0 on aggregate

27 July Third qualifying round (1st Leg)	(Denmark) F.C. Copenhagen	1–0	(Republic of Ireland) Shamrock Rovers	Parken Stadium, Copenhagen
19:00 IST	Sölvi Ottesen 4'	(Report)		Attendance: 11,571; Referee: Pavle Radovanović (Montenegro)

2 August Third qualifying round (2nd Leg)	(Republic of Ireland) Shamrock Rovers	0–2	(Denmark) F.C. Copenhagen	Tallaght Stadium, Dublin
19:45 IST		(Report)	Dame N'Doye 42'; Christian Bolaños 73'	Attendance: 6,000; Referee: Halis Özkahya (Turkey)

Shamrock Rovers lost 3–0 on aggregate.

=== UEFA Europa League ===
==== Play-off Phase ====
After defeat to F.C. Copenhagen in the Champions League, Rovers went into the Europa League, the secondary European competition. They entered the competition in the play-off round, the draw for which was held on 5 August in Nyon, Switzerland. Rovers were placed as an unseeded team in Pot 1, which meant that they could have faced teams such as Atlético Madrid and Panathinaikos, although the club were eventually drawn against Serbian club Partizan Belgrade. Partizan had also exited the Champions League at the third qualifying round after defeat to Belgian side Genk. In the previous season, Partizan had reached the group stages of the Champions League, so many considered Shamrock Rovers the underdogs.

The first leg, which was broadcast live on RTÉ Two, took place on 18 August at Tallaght Stadium. Rovers started the game with a defensive tactic, but were unable to prevent Nemanja Tomić scoring after only 14 minutes following a dominant opening from the away side. Rovers did improve towards the end of the half, but only after Partizan had wasted several opportunities to increase their lead. Partizan were again the better side in the beginning of the second half, however the introduction of Gary O'Neill brought Shamrock Rovers back into the game as an attacking force. In the 81st minute, Gary McCabe broke through the Partizan defense with the aid of Gary Twigg and scored the equalising goal. Despite further chances for Rovers, the match ended 1–1, leaving the tie in the balance.

The second leg took place on 25 August at Partizan Stadium. The match was broadcast live on Setanta Ireland. Rovers went into the game needing to score at least one goal to avoid being eliminated from the competition, due to the away goal scored by Partizan Belgrade in the first leg. The team started the game nervously and could have conceded after only 3 minutes but for Vladimir Jovancic shooting wide when one-on-one with the goalkeeper. Vladimir Volkov forced a save from Ryan Thompson in the 28th minute, before the Partizan player put his side in front after 35 minutes. Shortly after the interval, Chris Turner came close to scoring for Rovers when his header hit the post. The breakthrough for Rovers came in the 58th minute - a spectacular volley from Patrick Sullivan put the teams back on level terms again. The match went to extra-time as Partizan were unable to convert several chances. Rovers were fortunate to remain level in the game following Stefan Babović's free-kick which hit the woodwork and a reckless challenge by Ryan Thompson which could have resulted in a penalty to the home side. The winning goal came in the 113th minute of extra time. Ciarán Kilduff's shot was only parried away as far as Karl Sheppard, who was taken down inside the penalty area by the Partizan goalkeeper before he could shoot. Midfielder Stephen O'Donnell converted the penalty. The game ended 2–1 to Shamrock Rovers, with Rovers winning the tie 3–2 on aggregate and qualifying for the group stages of the competition. This was the first time an Irish club had qualified for the group stages of a European competition.

18 August Play-off round (1st Leg)	(Republic of Ireland) Shamrock Rovers	1–1	(Serbia) Partizan Belgrade	Tallaght Stadium, Dublin
20:45 IST	Gary McCabe 81'	(Report)	Nemanja Tomić 14'	Attendance: 4,650; Referee: Hannes Kaasik (Estonia)

25 August Play-off round (2nd Leg)	(Serbia) Partizan Belgrade	1–2 (a.e.t.)	(Republic of Ireland) Shamrock Rovers	Stadion FK Partizan, Belgrade
19:30 IST	Vladimir Volkov 35'; Medo Kamara (red card)	(Report)	Patrick Sullivan 58'; Stephen O'Donnell 113' (pen.)	Attendance: 13,706; Referee: Ján Valášek (Slovakia)

Shamrock Rovers won 3–2 on aggregate

==== Group stage ====
The draw for the Europa League Group Stages took place on 26 August in Monaco. Based on the UEFA coefficients, Rovers were placed in Pot 4. This meant that they would be drawn with one team from each other pot. Among the teams which Rovers could have faced were Fulham, Atlético Madrid and Stoke City. The draw eventually paired Rovers with Tottenham Hotspur of the English Premier League, Rubin Kazan of the Russian Premier League and PAOK of the Super League Greece. All matches were broadcast live on TV3.

Rovers' first group stage fixture took place on 15 September against Rubin Kazan. Rubin Kazan started off well with a goal from Obafemi Martins in the 3rd minute. Rovers got into the game after the goal but the away side still dominated possession during the first half. Both sides missed penalties in the match, although goals from Christian Noboa and Gökdeniz Karadeniz in the second half ensured victory for Rubin Kazan.

Rovers then travelled to White Hart Lane to face Tottenham Hotspur on 29 September. Tottenham started off well with both Jermain Defoe and Roman Pavlyuchenko hitting the woodwork before half-time. Stephen O'Donnell cleared Roman Pavlyuchenko's header off the line to maintain the deadlock at the end of the first half. It was Rovers who took a surprise lead early in the second half. In the 51st minute, Stephen Rice diverted a long-range shot into the net to put Rovers ahead. Their lead did not last long however - in the 60th minute, Pavlyuchenko equalised from a header. One minute later, Defoe scored to put Spurs ahead. Giovani dos Santos completed the scoring in the 65th minute. The match ended in a 3–1 defeat for Rovers.

PAOK were the opponents on 20 October in Thessaloniki, Greece. PAOK took the lead early in the first half through Costin Lazăr's long range strike. Both sides then had chances to score, but it was Shamrock Rovers who scored the next goal - Karl Sheppard headed in a free-kick from Billy Dennehy. However, Rovers suffered another defeat due to another long range goal from Vieirinha. In the return leg in Dublin, PAOK scored three goals in the first half as they comfortably won the game 3–1, and in doing so eliminated Rovers from the competition. Billy Dennehy scored what proved to be only a consolation goal for Rovers from a free kick early in the second half.

Rovers again failed to pick up any points in their fifth group game, an away game against Rubin Kazan. Nelson Haedo Valdez took advantage of poor defending to score his side's first goal. Their lead did not last long, however, as Ken Oman equalised for Rovers two minutes later. Bibras Natcho's goal gave Rubin Kazan the lead at half-time; their lead would have been greater had Dan Murray not cleared Obafemi Martins' effort off the line. Rubin Kazan scored twice in the second half to complete the scoring, although Karl Sheppard did hit the bar late in the game.

The club's European campaign concluded with a 4–0 home defeat to Tottenham Hotspur; a result that meant that Rovers failed to pick up any points during the group stage. In what was only their second competitive fixture since the end of the domestic season, Rovers had the better of the opening minutes and should have taken the lead after only 2 minutes, but James Paterson's effort was wrongly ruled out for offside. Steven Pienaar's first goal for Tottenham was the first goal of the match. Andros Townsend and Jermain Defoe scored Tottenham's second and third goals respectively. Although Tottenham did score a fourth goal through Harry Kane, it was Rovers who had the best of the second half, while both Jake Livermore and Carlo Cudicini were lucky to avoid red cards after bringing down Rovers players when they were through on goal. This was Michael O'Neill's final match in charge of the club.

===== Group table =====
Pos	Team	Pld	W	D	L	GF	GA	GD	Pts	Qualification	PAOK	RK	TH	SR
1	(Greece) PAOK	6	3	3	0	10	6	+4	12	Advance to knockout phase	—	1–1	0–0	2–1
2	(Russia) Rubin Kazan	6	3	2	1	11	5	+6	11	Advance to knockout phase	2–2	—	1–0	4–1
3	(England) Tottenham Hotspur	6	3	1	2	9	4	+5	10		1–2	1–0	—	3–1
4	(Republic of Ireland) Shamrock Rovers	6	0	0	6	4	19	−15	0		1–3	0–3	0–4	—

Source: Soccerway

===== Results =====
15 September Group Stages (R. 1)	(Republic of Ireland) Shamrock Rovers	0–3	(Russia) Rubin Kazan	Tallaght Stadium, Dublin
18:00 IST		(Report)	Obafemi Martins 3'; Christian Noboa 50'; Gökdeniz Karadeniz 60'	Attendance: 6,920; Referee: Zsolt Szabó (Hungary)

29 September Group Stages (R. 2)	(England) Tottenham Hotspur	3–1	(Republic of Ireland) Shamrock Rovers	White Hart Lane, London
20:05 IST	Roman Pavlyuchenko 60'; Jermain Defoe 61'; Giovani dos Santos 65'	(Report)	Stephen Rice 48'	Attendance: 34,350; Referee: Gediminas Mažeika (Lithuania)

20 October Group Stages (R. 3)	(Greece) PAOK	2–1	(Republic of Ireland) Shamrock Rovers	Toumba Stadium, Thessaloniki
20:05 IST	Costin Lazăr 12'; Vieirinha 63'	(Report)	Karl Sheppard 48'	Referee: Tony Asumaa (Finland)

3 November Group Stages (R. 4)	(Republic of Ireland) Shamrock Rovers	1–3	(Greece) PAOK	Tallaght Stadium, Dublin
18:00 IST	Billy Dennehy 51'	(Report)	Dimitris Salpingidis 7' 38'; Giorgos Fotakis 35'	Attendance: 7,000; Referee: Aleksei Kulbakov (Belarus)

30 November Group Stages (R. 5)	(Russia) Rubin Kazan	4–1	(Republic of Ireland) Shamrock Rovers	Central Stadium, Kazan
18:00 IST	Nelson Haedo Valdez 10', 51'; Bibras Natcho 36'; Obafemi Martins 62'	Report	Ken Oman 12'	Attendance: 15,740; Referee: Harald Lechner (Austria)

15 December Group Stages (R. 6)	(Republic of Ireland) Shamrock Rovers	0–4	(England) Tottenham Hotspur	Tallaght Stadium, Dublin
18:00 IST		(Report)	Steven Pienaar 29'; Andros Townsend 38'; Jermain Defoe 45'; Harry Kane 90+1'	Referee: Stephan Studer (Switzerland)

== Squad statistics ==
=== Appearances/Goals ===
No.	Pos.	Name	League		Cup		Setanta Cup		EA Sports Cup		Champions League		Europa League		Total		Discipline	
No.	Pos.	Name	Apps	Goals	Apps	Goals	Apps	Goals	Apps	Goals	Apps	Goals	Apps	Goals	Apps	Goals	Yellow card	Red card
1	GK	(England) Richard Brush	7(0)	0	2(0)	0	0(0)	0	0(0)	0	0(0)	0	1(0)	0	10	0	0	0
2	DF	(Republic of Ireland) Patrick Sullivan	32(0)	0	2(0)	0	3(2)	0	0(0)	0	4(0)	0	6(0)	1	49	1	15	1
3	DF	(Republic of Ireland) Enda Stevens	27(1)	0	1(0)	0	4(0)	0	0(0)	0	4(0)	0	5(1)	0	43	0	9	0
4	DF	(Scotland) Craig Sives	19(1)	2	3(0)	0	0(0)	0	0(0)	0	4(0)	0	5(0)	0	32	2	7	1
5	DF	(England) Dan Murray	32(0)	2	3(1)	0	4(0)	0	0(0)	0	1(1)	0	6(0)	0	46	2	2	0
6	MF	(Republic of Ireland) Stephen Rice	19(9)	1	1(1)	0	5(0)	1	0(0)	0	1(1)	0	5(1)	1	43	3	7	0
7	MF	(Republic of Ireland) Gary McCabe	26(5)	6	4(0)	2	0(2)	0	0(0)	0	1(2)	0	4(1)	1	45	9	7	1
8	MF	(Republic of Ireland) Stephen O'Donnell	7(5)	2	3(0)	0	2(0)	0	0(0)	0	1(1)	0	4(1)	1	24	3	4	0
9	FW	(Scotland) Gary Twigg	24(3)	15	0(1)	0	0(1)	0	0(0)	0	4(0)	0	4(3)	0	40	15	6	0
10	FW	(Republic of Ireland) Karl Sheppard	18(6)	10	1(2)	1	5(0)	3	0(0)	0	0(0)	0	2(1)	1	35	15	4	0
11	FW	(Republic of Ireland) Ciarán Kilduff	8(19)	6	4(0)	1	2(1)	2	1(0)	0	0(2)	0	0(5)	0	42	9	3	0
13	DF	(Republic of Ireland) Pat Flynn	3(4)	0	1(1)	0	2	0	1(0)	0	0(0)	0	0(0)	0	11	0	4	2
14	FW	(Republic of Ireland) Dean Kelly	5(6)	1	0(1)	1	3(1)	1	1(0)	1	3(1)	0	0(0)	0	21	4	3	0
15	FW	(Republic of Ireland) Paddy Kavanagh	1(6)	0	0(1)	0	2(2)	2	1(0)	0	0(0)	0	0(0)	0	13	2	1	0
16	GK	(Jamaica) Ryan Thompson	7(0)	0	2(0)	0	2(0)	0	1(0)	0	2(0)	0	5(0)	0	19	0	0	0
17	DF	(Republic of Ireland) Ken Oman	19(1)	2	0(0)	0	4(0)	0	0(0)	0	3(0)	0	1(0)	0	28	2	5	1
18	MF	(Northern Ireland) Chris Turner	15(8)	3	2(1)	2	0(0)	0	0(0)	0	3(0)	1	3(2)	0	34	6	13	0
19	FW	(Republic of Ireland) Gary O'Neill	20(5)	2	3(0)	1	3(0)	1	0(0)	0	0(1)	0	0(1)	0	33	4	1	0
20	MF	(Republic of Ireland) Billy Dennehy	23(12)	9	3(0)	4	2(1)	2	0(0)	0	4(0)	0	5(1)	1	51	16	5	0
21	MF	(Republic of Ireland) Ronan Finn	27(6)	4	1(2)	0	3(1)	1	1(0)	0	4(0)	0	4(1)	0	50	6	3	0
22	MF	(Republic of Ireland) Conor McCormack	18(3)	0	2(0)	0	5(0)	0	1(0)	0	3(1)	0	3(1)	0	37	0	5	0
23	DF	(Republic of Ireland) Sean Gannon	1(0)	0	3(0)	0	0(0)	0	0(0)	0	0(0)	0	0(0)	0	4	0	1	0
24	MF	(Republic of Ireland) Karl Moore	1(2)	0	0(0)	0	0(0)	0	0(0)	0	0(0)	0	0(0)	0	3	0	0	0
25	GK	(Republic of Ireland) Craig Hyland	0(0)	0	0(0)	0	0(0)	0	0(0)	0	0(0)	0	0(0)	0	0	0	0	0
26	DF	(Scotland) Jim Paterson	8(0)	0	0(0)	0	0(0)	0	0(0)	0	0(0)	0	2(0)	0	10	0	2	0
27	MF	(England) Rohan Ricketts	7(3)	2	0(1)	0	0(0)	0	0(0)	0	0(0)	0	1(1)	0	13	2	0	0
##	MF	(Republic of Ireland) Lorcan Shannon	0(0)	0	0(1)	0	0(0)	0	0(0)	0	0(0)	0	0(0)	0	1	0	0	0
##	DF	(Republic of Ireland) Jack Memery	0(0)	0	2(0)	0	0(0)	0	1(0)	0	0(0)	0	0(0)	0	3	0	0	0
##	DF	(Republic of Ireland) Mick Doyle	0(0)	0	0(0)	0	1(0)	0	1(0)	0	0(0)	0	0(0)	0	2	0	0	0
##	MF	(Republic of Ireland) Sean Byrne	0(0)	0	0(0)	0	0(0)	0	1(0)	0	0(0)	0	0(0)	0	1	0	0	0
##	MF	(Republic of Ireland) Colm Corcoran	0(1)	0	0(0)	0	0(0)	0	0(1)	0	0(0)	0	0(0)	0	2	0	0	0
##	MF	(Republic of Ireland) Jack Flood	0(0)	0	0(0)	0	0(0)	0	0(1)	0	0(0)	0	0(0)	0	1	0	1	0
##	MF	(Republic of Ireland) Darragh Satelle	0(0)	0	0(0)	0	0(0)	0	0(1)	0	0(0)	0	0(0)	0	1	0	0	0
##	MF	(Republic of Ireland) Paul Connolly	0(0)	0	0(0)	0	0(0)	0	0(1)	0	0(0)	0	0(0)	0	1	0	0	0
##	GK	(Northern Ireland) Alan Mannus	22(0)	0	0(0)	0	3(0)	0	0(0)	0	2(0)	0	0(0)	0	27	0	1	0

Updated 4 November 2011

=== Top scorers ===
Position	Nation	Number	Name	Premier Division	Setanta Cup	FAI Cup	League Cup	Champions League	Europa League	Total
1	(Republic of Ireland)	20	Billy Dennehy	9	4	2	0	0	1	16
2	(Scotland)	9	Gary Twigg	15	0	0	0	0	0	15
3	(Republic of Ireland)	10	Karl Sheppard	10	1	3	0	0	1	15
4	(Republic of Ireland)	11	Ciarán Kilduff	6	1	2	0	0	0	9
5	(Republic of Ireland)	7	Gary McCabe	6	2	0	0	0	1	9
6	(Republic of Ireland)	21	Ronan Finn	5	0	1	0	0	0	6
7	(Northern Ireland)	18	Chris Turner	3	2	0	0	1	0	6
8	(Republic of Ireland)	19	Gary O'Neill	2	1	1	0	0	0	4
9	(Republic of Ireland)	14	Dean Kelly	1	1	1	1	0	0	4
10	(Republic of Ireland)	8	Stephen O'Donnell	2	0	0	0	0	1	3
11	(Republic of Ireland)	6	Stephen Rice	1	0	1	0	0	1	3
12	(Scotland)	4	Craig Sives	2	0	0	0	0	0	2
12	(England)	5	Dan Murray	2	0	0	0	0	0	2
12	(England)	27	Rohan Ricketts	2	0	0	0	0	0	2
12	(Republic of Ireland)	17	Ken Oman	2	0	0	0	0	0	2
16	(Republic of Ireland)	15	Paddy Kavanagh	0	0	2	0	0	0	2
17	(Republic of Ireland)	2	Pat Sullivan	0	0	0	0	0	1	1
	Own Goals			1	0	0	0	0	0	1
Total				69	12	13	1	1	6	102

Includes all competitive matches.
Premier Division scorers appear higher on list when total goals are equal.
Last updated 04/11/11

=== Disciplinary record ===
No.	Pos.	Nat.	Player	Notes
7	MF	(Republic of Ireland)	McCabe		5	0	1
13	DF	(Republic of Ireland)	Flynn		2	0	1
2	DF	(Republic of Ireland)	Sullivan		12	1	0
17	DF	(Republic of Ireland)	Oman		5	1	0
4	DF	(Scotland)	Sives		5	1	0
18	MF	(Northern Ireland)	Turner		9	0	0
3	DF	(Republic of Ireland)	Stevens		5	0	0
9	FW	(Scotland)	Twigg		5	0	0
20	MF	(Republic of Ireland)	Dennehy		4	0	0
22	MF	(Republic of Ireland)	McCormack		3	0	0
8	MF	(Republic of Ireland)	O'Donnell		2	0	0
14	FW	(Republic of Ireland)	Kelly		2	0	0
26	DF	(Scotland)	Paterson		2	0	0
11	FW	(Republic of Ireland)	Kilduff		1	0	0
5	DF	(England)	Murray		1	0	0
21	MF	(Republic of Ireland)	Finn		1	0	0
15	MF	(Republic of Ireland)	Kavanagh		1	0	0
19	FW	(Republic of Ireland)	O'Neill		1	0	0
10	FW	(Republic of Ireland)	Sheppard		1	0	0
23	DF	(Republic of Ireland)	Gannon		1	0	0
##	GK	(Northern Ireland)	Mannus	Left the club in July	1	0	0

Last updated: 29 October 2011
Only competitive matches
(yellow card) = Number of bookings; (second yellow card) = Number of sending offs after a second yellow card; (red card) = Number of sending offs by a direct red card.
Notes: League only

=== Transfers ===
==== In ====
Squad No.	Position	Country	Name	Age	Previous Club	Type	Transfer window	Contract Ends	Transfer Fee	Reference
16	Goalkeeper	(Jamaica)	Ryan Thompson	26	Portland Phoenix (United States)	Transfer	Pre-Season	Dec. 2011	Free
1	Goalkeeper	(England)	Richard Brush	26	Sligo Rovers (Republic of Ireland)	Transfer	Summer	Dec. 2011	Free
8	Midfielder	(Republic of Ireland)	Stephen O'Donnell	25	Galway United (Republic of Ireland)	Transfer	Pre-Season	Dec. 2011	Free
7	Midfielder	(Republic of Ireland)	Gary McCabe	23	Sligo Rovers (Republic of Ireland)	Transfer	Pre-Season	Dec. 2011	Free
10	Forward	(Republic of Ireland)	Karl Sheppard	20	Galway United (Republic of Ireland)	Transfer	Pre-Season	Dec. 2011	Free
11	Forward	(Republic of Ireland)	Ciarán Kilduff	22	UCD (Republic of Ireland)	Transfer	Pre-Season	Dec. 2011	Free
14	Forward	(Republic of Ireland)	Dean Kelly	26	Oldham Athletic (England)	Transfer	Pre-Season	Dec. 2011	Free
17	Defender	(Republic of Ireland)	Ken Oman	29	Bohemians (Republic of Ireland)	Transfer	Pre-Season	Dec. 2011	Free
19	Forward	(Republic of Ireland)	Gary O'Neill	29	Sporting Fingal (Republic of Ireland)	Transfer	Pre-Season	Dec. 2011	Free
21	Midfielder	(Republic of Ireland)	Ronan Finn	23	Sporting Fingal (Republic of Ireland)	Transfer	Pre-Season	Nov. 2012	Free
22	Midfielder	(Republic of Ireland)	Conor McCormack	21	Triestina (Italy)	Transfer	Pre-Season	Dec. 2011	Free
24	Midfielder	(Republic of Ireland)	Karl Moore	22	Galway United (Republic of Ireland)	Transfer	Summer	Dec. 2011	Free
26	Defender	(Scotland)	Jim Paterson	31	Plymouth Argyle (England)	Transfer	Summer	TBA	Free
27	Midfielder	(England)	Rohan Ricketts	28	SV Wilhelmshaven (Germany)	Transfer	Summer	TBA	Free

==== Out ====
Player	Country	Position	Transferred To	Reference
Alan Mannus	(Northern Ireland)	Goalkeeper	St Johnstone
Neale Fenn	(Republic of Ireland)	Forward	Retired
Dessie Baker	(Republic of Ireland)	Forward	Retired
James Chambers	(Republic of Ireland)	Midfielder	Hamilton Academical
Aidan Price	(Republic of Ireland)	Defender	Bohemians
Stephen Bradley	(Republic of Ireland)	Midfielder	St. Patrick's Athletic
Pat Jennings Jr.	(England)	Goalkeeper	Glenavon
Aidan Downes	(Republic of Ireland)	Midfielder	Bohemians
Robert Bayly	(Republic of Ireland)	Midfielder	Bohemians
Danny Murphy	(Republic of Ireland)	Defender	Cork City
Thomas Stewart	(Northern Ireland)	Forward	Partick Thistle

== Records ==
Rovers played a record number of 56 games in the whole 2011 season.

=== Overall ===
	Total	Home	Away
Games played	56	27	29
Games won	32	17	15
Games drawn	11	5	6
Games lost	13	5	8
Biggest win	6–0 vs UCD & 0–6 vs UCD	6–0 vs UCD	6-0 vs UCD
Biggest loss	0–3 vs FC Rubin Kazan	0–3 vs FC Rubin Kazan	0-2 vs Sligo Rovers
Biggest win (League)	6–0 vs UCD	6–0 vs UCD	4-0 vs Drogheda United
Biggest win (Cup)	6-0 vs UCD	4-0 vs Athlone Town	6-0 vs UCD
Biggest win(Europe)	1-0 vs Flora Tallinn & 2-1(a.e.t.) vs FK Partizan Belgrade	1-0 vs Flora Tallinn	2-1(a.e.t.) vs FK Partizan Belgrade
Biggest loss (League)	0-2 vs Sligo Rovers	0-1 vs Bray Wanderers	0-2 vs Sligo Rovers
Biggest loss (Cup)	0-1 vs Sligo Rovers	N/A	0-1 vs Sligo Rovers
Biggest loss (Europe)	0–3 vs FC Rubin Kazan	0–3 vs FC Rubin Kazan	1-3 vs Tottenham Hotspur
Clean sheets	23	12	11
Goals scored	102	58	44
Goals conceded	47	25	22
Goal difference	+55	+33	+22
Consecutive Victories	5	5	5
Unbeaten run	8	11	5
Consecutive Defeats	2	1	1
Winless Run	4	4	2
Average GF per game	1.82	2.15	1.52
Average GA per game	0.84	0.93	0.76
Yellow cards	103	41	62
Red cards	6	4	2
Most appearances	(Republic of Ireland) Billy Dennehy (51)		
Most minutes played (League)	(England) Dan Murray (2,837)		
Top scorer	(Republic of Ireland) Billy Dennehy (16)		
Points	77/108 (71.3%)	42/54 (77.78%)	35/54 (64.81%)
Winning rate (League)	63.89%	72.22%	55.56%

Last updated: 4 November 2011
Source: Competitive matches

Leinster Senior Cup Matches not counted for the purposes of this table
