= 2011 FAI Cup =

FAI Ford Cup

Tournament details
- Country: Ireland
- Teams: 45

Final positions
- Champions: Sligo Rovers
- Runners-up: Shelbourne

The 2011 FAI Senior Challenge Cup, also known as the 2011 FAI Ford Cup, is the 91st season of the national football competition of Ireland. The winners of the competition will earn spots in both the second qualifying round of the 2012–13 UEFA Europa League and the 2012 Setanta Sports Cup.

A total of 45 teams competed in the 2011 competition which commenced on the weekend ending on 20 March 2011. The 21 teams entered from the 2011 League of Ireland Premier and First divisions received byes into the third round stage while the remaining 24 teams entered at the first and Second round stages with all but four of these teams receiving byes into the second round. These 24 teams composed of four 2011 A Championship non-reserve clubs, the sixteen clubs from the fourth round of the 2010–11 FAI Intermediate Cup and the semifinalists of the 2010–11 FAI Junior Cup.

== Teams ==
Round	Clubs remaining	Clubs involved	Winners from previous round	New entries this round	Leagues entering at this round
First round	45	4	none	4	Leinster Senior League
Second round	43	22	2	20	A Championship; Munster Senior League; Ulster Senior League
Third round	32	32	11	21	Premier Division; First Division
Fourth round	16	16	16	none	none
Quarter-finals	8	8	8	none	none
Semi-finals	4	4	4	none	none
Final	2	2	2	none	none

== Calendar ==
The calendar for the 2011 FAI Cup, as announced by Football Association of Ireland.

Round	Main date	Number of fixtures	Clubs	New entries this round	Prize money
First round	20 March 2011	2	45 → 43	4: 42nd–45th	n/a
Second round	17 April 2011	11	43 → 32	20: 22nd–41st	n/a
Third round	3 June 2011	16	32 → 16	21: 1st–21st	n/a
Fourth round	26 August 2011	8	16 → 8	none	n/a
Quarter-finals	18 September 2011	4	8 → 4	none	n/a
Semi-finals	n/a	2	4 → 2	none	n/a
Final	n/a	1	2 → 1	none	Winner €50,000 runner – up €25,000

== Preliminary rounds ==
=== First round ===
The draw for this round was conducted by FAI President Paddy McCaul and former player Paul Whelan at the FAI headquarters in Abbotstown on 7 March 2011. Only four of the 24 non-League of Ireland clubs participated in this round, with the remaining 20 clubs earning a bye to the second round. The matches were played on the weekend ending 20 March 2011.

20 March 2011	Drumcondra	1–1	Glebe North	Plunkett College VEC Ground
14:00 IST	Mullins 58'	Report	Foley 48'	Referee: Anthony Redmond

28 March 2011 Replay	Glebe North	2–0	Drumcondra	Market Green
19:45 IST	Barrett 68', 78'	Report

20 March 2011	Bangor Celtic	0–0	Bluebell United	Nutgrove National School Ground
14:00 IST		Report

28 March 2011 Replay	Bluebell United	0–2	Bangor Celtic	Capco Park
14:00 IST		Report	Brennan 21', 67'

=== Second round ===
Like for the first round, the draw for this round was conducted by FAI President Paddy McCaul and former player Paul Whelan at the FAI headquarters in Abbotstown on 7 March 2011. The two winners from the first round joined the remaining 20 non-League of Ireland clubs in this round. The matches were played on the weekend ending 17 April 2011.

17 April 2011	St. Michael's	0–2	Crumlin United	Frank Cooke Park
15:00 IST	Cosgrove (red card) 24'	Report	Meade 70'; Griffiths 71'; Lee (red card) 73'

17 April 2011	Greystones	1–1	Bangor Celtic	Archfield
14:30 IST		Report

24 April 2011 Replay	Bangor Celtic	0–2	Greystones	Nutgrove National School Ground
11:00 IST		Report

17 April 2011	Everton AFC	2–0	Fanad United	Everton Park
14:00 IST		Report

17 April 2011	College Corinthians	0–1	Sheriff Y.C.	Corinthians Park
14:30 IST		Report	Murphy 16'

16 April 2011	Tralee Dynamos	0–0	Youghal United	Mount Hawk Park
14:00 IST		Report

23 April 2011 Replay	Youghal United	2–1	Tralee Dynamos	Ardrath Park
15:00 IST		Report

15 April 2011	Rockmount	1–4	New Ross Celtic	Rockmount Park
19:30 IST	O'Callaghan 85'	Report	Phelan 55'; O'Neill 60'; Farrell 70'; Lee 87'

17 April 2011	Sacred Heart	2–1	FC Carlow	Killinarden Hall
14:00 IST		Report

17 April 2011	Avondale United	1–1	Pike Rovers	Avondale Park
14:30 IST	O'Donoghue 73' (own goal)	Report	Hanrahan 87'

1 May 2011 Replay	Pike Rovers	3–2	Avondale United	Pike Rovers Ground
14:30 IST	Moloney 22'; Hartnett 43'; Colbert 55'	Report	Cronin 7'; O'Sullivan 25'

17 April 2011	Belgrove	0–1	Midleton	St. Paul's College
14:00 IST		Report	Duggan 85'

16 April 2011	Cobh Ramblers	1–2	Cherry Orchard	St Colman's Park
15:00 IST	Meade 43'	Report	McNeill 48' (pen.); Crowther 76'	Attendance: 100; Referee: Alan Kelly

17 April 2011	Glebe North	0–1	Douglas Hall	Market Green
14:00 IST		Report	Varian 1'

=== Third round ===
In this round, the 21 clubs of the 2011 League of Ireland will be joined by the 11 winners of the second round. The draw for the third round was made on 9 May 2011 on Monday Night Soccer on RTÉ Two. The Third round games will be played on the weekend ending 5 June 2011.

3 June 2011	Salthill Devon	1–2	Sheriff Y.C.	Drom Clubhouse
19:45 IST	Quinlan 74'	Report	Rock 51', 63'	Referee: Conor Fitzgerald

3 June 2011	Drogheda United	4–0	Mervue United	Hunky Dorys Park
19:45 IST	Hanaphy 7'; Corcoran 76'; Freeman 83', 84'	Report		Referee: Derek Tomney

3 June 2011	Waterford United	3–0	New Ross Celtic	RSC
19:45 IST	Murphy 39', 57'; Wilson 84'	Report		Attendance: 615; Referee: Padraig Sutton

3 June 2011	Cherry Orchard	1–2	UCD	UCD Bowl
19:45 IST	McNevin 80'	Report	Russell 34'; Doyle 67'	Attendance: 300; Referee: Damien Hancock

3 June 2011	Monaghan United	4–1	Everton A.F.C.	Kingspan Century Park
20:00 IST	O'Brien 20', 22', 85'; Brennan 35'	Report	Collins 83' (own goal)	Referee: Darren Coombes

3 June 2011	Wexford Youths	4–1	Derry City	Ferrycarrig Park
20:00 IST	Furlong 32', 47' (penalty), 80'; Ryan 71'	Report	Zayed 90'	Attendance: 200; Referee: Jim McKell

3 June 2011	Crumlin United	0–3	St Patrick's Athletic	Richmond Park
19:45 IST	Loughran (red card) 59'	Report	Shortall 16'; McMillan 33'; Carroll 66'	Attendance: 700; Referee: Neil Doyle

5 June 2011	Greystones	1–3	Shelbourne	Archfield
14:30 IST	McClug 2'	Report	Boyle 29'; Cassidy 48'; Byrne 59'	Attendance: 600; Referee: Richie Winter

5 June 2011	Sacred Heart	2–4	Limerick	Killinarden Hall
15:30 IST	Weafer 48'; Lowry 58'	Report	Brosnan 22', 40'; O'Connor 45'; Quinn 85'	Referee: Phil Caschera

3 June 2011	Sligo Rovers	3–2	Pike Rovers	The Showgrounds
19:45 IST	McGuinness 61', 67'; Cretaro 71'	Report	Carroll 58'; Ryan 85'	Attendance: 965; Referee: Paul McLaughlin

3 June 2011	Bohemians	3–0	Douglas Hall	Dalymount Park
19:45 IST	Flood 12'; Traynor 77'; Bayly 84'	Report		Attendance: 500; Referee: Rob Rogers

5 June 2011	Dundalk	4–1	Galway United	Oriel Park
15:00 IST	Bennett 19'; Breen 45'; Quigley 75' (penalty); Kearns 76'	Report	Murphy 13'; Kelly (red card) 93'	Attendance: 576; Referee: Paul Tuite

3 June 2011	Longford Town	0–0	Finn Harps	Flancare Park
20:00 IST		Report	McHugh (red card) 56'	Attendance: 300; Referee: John McLoughlin

6 June 2011 Replay	Finn Harps	0–1	Longford Town	Finn Park
19:45 IST		Report	Salmon 82'	Attendance: 300; Referee: John McLoughlin

3 June 2011	Midleton	0–2	Cork City	Knockgriffin Industrial Park
19:45 IST		Report	Cummins 53' (penalty); Sullivan 59'	Attendance: 1,600; Referee: Anthony Buttimer

3 June 2011	Shamrock Rovers	4–0	Athlone Town	Tallaght Stadium
20:00 IST	McCabe 12'; Turner 46'; Dean Kelly 75'; Billy Dennehy 82'	Report		Attendance: 1,500; Referee: Tom Connolly

5 June 2011	Youghal United	1–3	Bray Wanderers	Ardrath Park
15:00 IST	Clohessy 34'	Report	Mulroy 8', 57'; Murphy 14'	Referee: Graham Kelly

=== Fourth round ===
The draw for the fourth round was made on 13 July 2011 on Monday Night Soccer.

29 August 2011	Shamrock Rovers	2–2	UCD	Tallaght Stadium
20:00 IST	Sheppard 61'; Kilduff 70'; Flynn (red card) 80'	Report	Belhout 74'; Creevy 81'	Attendance: 2,484; Referee: Tom Connolly

5 September 2011 Replay	UCD	0–6	Shamrock Rovers	UCD Bowl
19:45 IST	Leahy (red card) 25'	Report	Dennehy 4', 41', 71'; Turner 18'; McCabe 25' (pen.); O'Neill 91'	Referee: Dave McKeown

26 August 2011	Waterford United	0–3	St Patrick's Athletic	RSC
19:45 IST		Report	Kavanagh 17', 20'; Bradley 47' (pen.)	Attendance: 721; Referee: Anthony Buttimer

26 August 2011	Bray Wanderers	0–4	Limerick	Carlisle Grounds
19:45 IST	O'Connor (red card) 74'; Mitchell (red card) 74'	Report	Quinn 42', 90'; Behan 75' (pen.); Coughlan 86'	Attendance: 250; Referee: Rob Rogers

27 August 2011	Longford Town	1–3	Bohemians	Flancare Park
19:30 IST	Walsh 13'	Report	Downes 34'; Deans 52' (Own goal); Brennan 81'	Attendance: 700; Referee: Richie Winter

26 August 2011	Wexford Youths	0–1	Cork City	Ferrycarrig Park
20:00 IST	Broaders (red card) 90'	Report	O'Neill 73'

27 August 2011	Sligo Rovers	0–0	Monaghan United	Showgrounds
19:45 IST	Clarke (red card) 61'	Report	Quinn (red card) 75'	Attendance: 1,200; Referee: Paul Tuite

31 August Replay	Monaghan United	0–4	Sligo Rovers	Kingspan Century Park
20:00 IST		Report	23' Peers; 30', 86' Greene; 51' Kirby

26 August 2011	Sheriff Y.C.	0–3^{1}	Shelbourne	Tolka Park
20:00 IST		Report		Attendance: 1,538; Referee: Darren Coombes

26 August 2011	Drogheda United	1–1	Dundalk	Hunky Dorys Park
19:45 IST	Rogers 5'; Quigley (red card) 45'	Report	Quigley 45' (pen.)	Referee: Damien Hancock

30 August 2011 Replay	Dundalk	2–1	Drogheda United	Oriel Park
19:45 IST	Ward 25'; Quigley 29'		90+3' White

- Note 1: After a 3–2 victory for Sheriff Y.C. they were subsequently found to have fielded an ineligible player and were ejected from the cup. Shelbourne were awarded a 3–0 victory and qualified for the Quarter-finals.

== Final rounds ==
Quarter-finals
Dundalk	0 0
Bohemians	0 1
Cork City	0
St. Patrick's Athletic	1
Sligo Rovers	1
Shamrock Rovers	0
Shelbourne	4
Limerick	3

Semi-finals
Bohemians	0
Sligo Rovers	1
St. Patrick's Athletic	1 1
Shelbourne	1 3

Final
Sligo Rovers	4 (pen)
Shelbourne	1

=== Quarter-finals ===
The draw for the Quarter-finals, conducted by Vice President of FAI, Tony Fitzgerald and Women's Ireland national team manager Susan Ronan, took place on 29 August 2011 on Monday Night Soccer. Fixtures took place on the weekend of 18 September 2011.

16 September 2011	Cork City	0–1	St. Patrick's Athletic	Turners Cross
19:35 IST			30' North

16 September 2011	Dundalk	0–0	Bohemians	Oriel Park
19:45 IST

20 September 2011 Replay	Bohemians	1–0 (a.e.t.)	Dundalk	Dalymount Park
19:45 IST	108' Flood		(red card) 76' Bennett

19 September 2011	Sligo Rovers	1–0	Shamrock Rovers	Showgrounds
20:00 IST	Doyle 22'

3 October 2011	Shelbourne	4–3	Limerick	Tolka Park
	Hughes 19', 46', 76'; Bawdarkar 27' (o.g.)		Frost 54'; Sheedy 79', 89'

=== Semifinals ===
The draw for the semi-finals was conducted by Paul Osam and FAI President Paddy McCaul during Monday Night Soccer on 26 September 2011, after the first 3 games, but before the Shelbourne v Limerick game. Ties will be played on the weekend of 14 and 16 October 2011.

14 October 2011	Shelbourne	1–1	St Patrick's Athletic	Tolka Park, Dublin
19:35 IST	Hughes 72'; James (red card) 43'	Report	North 40'

17 October 2011 Replay	St Patrick's Athletic	1–3	Shelbourne	Richmond Park, Dublin
19:35 IST	E. McMillan 14'; Rogers (red card) 28'	Report	Dawson 31' (pen.); D. McGill 48'; Cassidy 86'

16 October 2011	Bohemians	0–1	Sligo Rovers	Dalymount Park, Dublin
15:30 IST		Report	McGuinness 73'

=== Final ===
6 November 2011	Shelbourne	1–1 (a.e.t.) (1–4 p)	Sligo Rovers	Aviva Stadium, Dublin
15:30 CEST	Hughes 33'; Clancy (red card) 36'	Report	48' Davoren	Attendance: 21,662; Referee: Richie Winter (Wicklow)
	Penalties
	Bermingham (penalty scored); Dawson (penalty missed); James (penalty missed)		(penalty scored) Doyle; (penalty scored) Ryan; (penalty scored) Keane; (penalty scored) Cretaro
