= Chris Turner (footballer, born 1987) =

Northern Irish footballer

Personal information
- Full name: Christopher Turner
- Date of birth: 3 January 1987 (age 39)
- Place of birth: Ballymoney, Northern Ireland
- Height: 5 ft 10 in (1.78 m)
- Position: Midfielder

Youth career
- 2002–2006: Derby County

Senior career*
Years	Team	Apps	(Gls)
2006–2007	Sligo Rovers	69	(9)
2007–2008	Bohemians	20	(1)
2008	Partick Thistle	2	(1)
2009	Dundalk	31	(12)
2010–2012	Shamrock Rovers	67	(12)
2012–2015	Dumbarton	83	(8)
2015	Hamilton Academical	13	(0)
2016–2017	Cowdenbeath	9	(1)
2017	Glenavon	4	(0)
2018	Derry City	0	(0)

International career
2006–2008	Northern Ireland U-21	12	(3)
- * Club domestic league appearances and goals as of 21:50, 16 May 2017 (UTC)

Individual edit PFAI Premier Division Team of the Year: 2009

Individual edit PFAI Premier Division Team of the Year: 2009

Chris Turner (born 3 January 1987) is a Northern Irish footballer. He has been capped at under-19 and under-21 level by Northern Ireland.

== Club career ==
Turner began his career at Derby County but moved to Ireland to join Sligo Rovers in December 2005 after the club returned to the top flight by winning the First Division title a month earlier. Turner helped Sligo to fifth position in their first season back in the big time and remained at the Showgrounds for the opening half of the 2007 season before signing for Bohemians in the July transfer window.

At Dalymount Park, Turner made his club debut in an FAI Cup win over Malahide United on 19 August 2007. However, after Sean Connor departed at the end of that season, Turner found himself out of favour under Pat Fenlon and he left the Gypsies by mutual consent in July 2008. He eventually signed for Partick Thistle. He had had a trial at Rangers before signing for Partick.

He was released by the Firhill outfit midway through the 2008–09 campaign, however, and he returned to Ireland and signed for Dundalk. He made his debut for the Lilywhites in the opening night defeat by Bohemians at Oriel Park on 6 March 2009 and scored his first club goals a fortnight later with two penalties in a 3–0 win at home to Drogheda United.

He was nominated for the PFAI Players' Player of the Year and made the League of Ireland Premier Division Team of the Year.

Despite apparently signing again for Sligo he was on the verge of quitting without playing a game. Turner signed for Shamrock Rovers on 29 January 2010, but Sligo lodged an appeal against the signing. In March 2010, Turner was declared a free agent. He made his Rovers debut at Morton Stadium on 5 April. He scored in the second round of qualifications for the 2011–12 UEFA Champions League in a match with Flora Tallinn at Tallaght Stadium, and contributed to the first victory for Shamrock Rovers in the elite competition.

On 29 August 2012, Turner left The Hoops by mutual consent citing personal reasons. His last appearance for Rovers ended in a sending off. He scored a total of 12 goals in 94 total appearances for Rovers. These included 13 appearances in European competitions including the 2011–12 UEFA Europa League group stages.

On 30 August 2012, he signed for Scottish First Division side Dumbarton until the end of the season. He turned down a new contract with the club in May 2015

Turner signed for Hamilton Academical in June 2015. He left Hamilton by mutual consent in December 2015.

Following a short spell at Cowdenbeath, Turner returned to his native Northern Ireland to sign for Glenavon.

== International career ==
Turner has appeared for Northern Ireland at many underage levels and was a regular in the under-21 side.

== Honours ==
Shamrock Rovers

- League of Ireland (2): 2010, 2011
- Setanta Sports Cup (1): 2011
