= Richard Brush =

English footballer (born 1984)

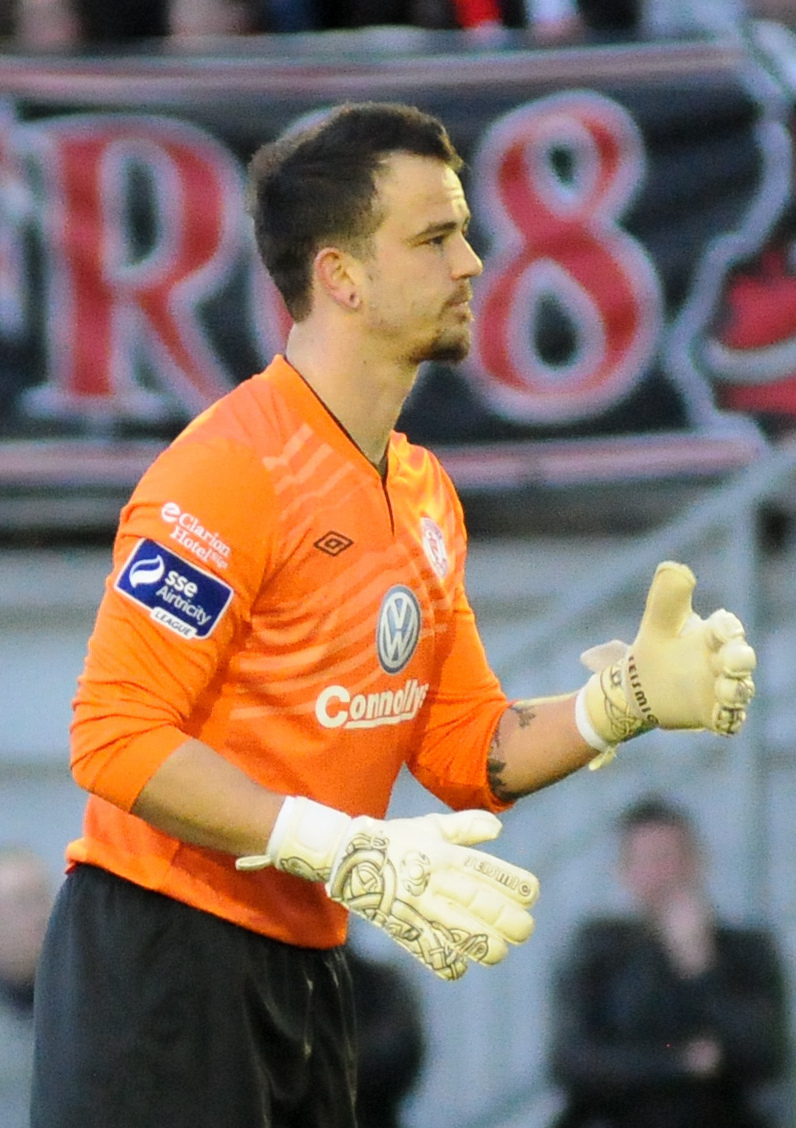
- Brush with Sligo Rovers in 2015

Personal information
- Date of birth: 26 November 1984 (age 41)
- Place of birth: Birmingham, England
- Position: Goalkeeper

Senior career*
Years	Team	Apps	(Gls)
2003–2005	Coventry City	0	(0)
2003–2004	→ Tamworth (loan)	10	(0)
2005	Stafford Rangers	?	(0)
2005	Hednesford Town	3	(0)
2005–2006	Shrewsbury Town	0	(0)
2006	Nuneaton Borough	?	(0)
2006–2011	Sligo Rovers	115	(0)
2011–2012	Shamrock Rovers	7	(0)
2012–2013	Sligo Rovers	1	(0)
2013–2014	Shamrock Rovers	14	(0)
2014–2016	Sligo Rovers	33	(0)
2016–2017	Finn Harps	19	(0)
2017–2018	Ballinamallard United	50	(0)
2018–2021	Cliftonville	75	(0)
2021–2026	Sligo Rovers	14	(0)
Total		341	(0)
- * Club domestic league appearances and goals as of 11:47, 13 November 2026 (UTC)

Richard Brush (born 26 November 1984) is an English former professional footballer who played as a goalkeeper.

== Club career ==
=== Early career (2003–2006) ===
Brush started his career with Coventry City where after one year as an apprentice, he signed a three-year professional contract. Whilst at the club went out on loan to Tamworth in November 2003 with his loan spell being extended into a second, and then a third month. His time at Coventry included a wrist injury, which led to him missing an entire season. He moved to a month by month contract in June 2005, before parting ways with Coventry at the end of August 2005 when his contract expired.

He joined Shrewsbury Town, where he served as backup to a young Joe Hart. He played for the club's reserves and remained with the club, still without a contract.

In September 2005 he played for Stafford Rangers and in November 2005 he turned out for Hednesford Town making four appearances including making his debut in an FA Cup first round match against Histon.

He left Shrewsbury in January 2006. and next joined Nuneaton Borough

=== Sligo Rovers ===
==== First spell (2006–2011) ====
Brush's next move was to League of Ireland club Sligo Rovers where he made his League of Ireland debut against Shelbourne on 28 July 2006. He stayed with the club until 2011.

At Sligo, he broke his wrist.

==== Second spell (2012–2013) ====
Brush returned to Sligo in January 2012.

==== Third spell (2014–2016) ====
Brush signed back for the third time for the 2014 season. These were difficult seasons for Sligo as their golden period was ending, despite a Setanta Cup win in 2014. At the end of the 2015 campaign, Brush departed the club again.

==== Fourth spell (2021–present) ====
On 1 February 2021, Brush signed again for Sligo Rovers. He was granted a testimonial match in 2025.

=== Shamrock Rovers ===
==== First spell (2011–2012) ====
Brush was signed by Shamrock Rovers on 21 July 2011. He made his Rovers debut on 3 September 2011 against Dundalk helping them to a 2–1 victory.

He made two appearances in the 2011–12 UEFA Europa League as Rovers became the first Irish side to reach a European competition group stage.

==== Second spell (2013–2014) ====
Brush signed back for The Hoops in December 2012.

=== Finn Harps (2016–2017) ===
In January 2016, Brush started training with newly promoted Finn Harps with a view to signing for the 2016 season. After joining the Ballybofey-based club, he made 19 league appearances.

=== Ballinamallard United (2017–2018) ===
In January 2017, Brush signed for Ballinamallard United on a free transfer taking the shirt number 30. He made his first appearance in the Irish Cup against Warrenpoint Town.

=== Cliftonville (2018–2021) ===
Brush signed for Cliftonville in July 2018, and played his first official match for the side on 4 August 2018 in a 2–1 win against Glentoran at the Oval.

== Personal life ==
In November 2018, he suffered a stroke while driving.

== Honours ==
Sligo Rovers

- League of Ireland Premier Division (1): 2012
- FAI Cup (1): 2010
- League of Ireland Cup (1): 2010
- Setanta Sports Cup (1): 2014

Shamrock Rovers

- League of Ireland Premier Division (1): 2011
- League of Ireland Cup (1): 2013
- Setanta Sports Cup (1): 2013
