= Karl Sheppard =

Irish footballer

Personal information
- Date of birth: 14 February 1991 (age 35)
- Place of birth: Dublin, Ireland
- Position: Forward

Youth career
- Portmarnock A.F.C.
- Shelbourne
- 2007–2010: Everton

Senior career*
Years	Team	Apps	(Gls)
2010	Galway United	35	(8)
2011–2012	Shamrock Rovers	24	(10)
2012–2013	Reading	0	(0)
2012–2013	→ Accrington Stanley (loan)	10	(1)
2013	→ Shamrock Rovers (loan)	26	(5)
2014	Shamrock Rovers	19	(1)
2014	→ Shamrock Rovers B (loan)	2	(0)
2015–2019	Cork City	150	(39)
2020	Shelbourne	11	(0)

International career
2011	Republic of Ireland U21	1	(0)
2011	League of Ireland XI	1	(0)
- * Club domestic league appearances and goals

Karl Sheppard (born 14 February 1991) is an Irish former footballer who played for Galway United, Shamrock Rovers (over two spells), Reading, Accrington Stanley, Cork City and Shelbourne.

== Club career ==
=== Academy ===
Sheppard initially played for Portmarnock AFC and Shelbourne before moving to the Everton Academy.

=== Galway United ===
In February 2010 Sheppard signed for Galway United, and made his League of Ireland debut at Richmond Park on the opening day of the 2010 League of Ireland season. His goal scoring in April earned him the Airtricity SWAI Player of the Month Award. In his last game for the club, he scored the winner in the Premier Division promotion/relegation play-off.

=== Shamrock Rovers ===
In January 2011, Sheppard signed for the League of Ireland Champions. He picked up his first senior trophy, playing all five games and scoring three goals en route to winning the 2011 Setanta Sports Cup.

In August 2011, Sheppard helped Shamrock Rovers make history in becoming the first ever League of Ireland team to reach the group stages of a major European club competition when they qualified for the 2011-12 UEFA Europa League group stage. Sheppard earned the penalty late in extra time that saw Rovers win through 3–2 on aggregate away to FK Partizan in the 2011 Europa League Playoff Round.

In October he scored at PAOK in the Europa League group stage.

He scored a total of 15 goals in 35 appearances in the 2011 Shamrock Rovers F.C. season.

=== Reading ===
On 12 January 2012, Sheppard announced via Twitter that he had signed a two-and-a-half-year contract at Reading, leaving Shamrock Rovers on a free transfer. Reading reportedly beat off interest from other Championship clubs including Blackpool, Cardiff and Peterborough United.

==== Accrington Stanley Loan ====
On 4 August 2012, Reading announced that Sheppard was joining Accrington Stanley on a six-month loan deal. He made his debut in their 1–0 League Cup defeat against Carlisle United on 11 August and then scored the winner against Southend United a week later, his first goal in English football. He returned to Reading on 3 January 2013 having not featured for Accrington since mid October.

=== Return to Shamrock Rovers ===
On 31 January 2013, he re-joined Shamrock Rovers on a six-month loan deal. He made his return to the team in a 1–0 defeat to Coleraine on 11 February in the Setanta Cup, but had to wait nearly three months for his first goal, scoring a late equaliser in a 1–1 draw with Sligo Rovers on 3 May. Days before his original spell was due to expire, Sheppard's loan was extended until the end of the 2013 League of Ireland season.

In December 2013 Sheppard signed a one-year contract with Shamrock Rovers for the 2014 season after leaving Reading without making an appearance.

=== Cork City ===
On 1 November 2014, Cork City announced the signing of Karl Sheppard from Shamrock Rovers. Sheppard scored 2 goals in his first 2 games for the Leesiders. In August 2015, it was announced that Sheppard had signed a 2-year contract to keep him at City, and he went on to score 13 goals in the 2015 season. He scored his second European goal against FCI Levadia Tallinn in the 2017–18 UEFA Europa League

A member of the FAI Cup and Premier Division double winning squad in 2017, by the start of the 2018 season Sheppard had scored 30 goals from 92 league appearances across 3 seasons (2015/2016/2017) with Cork City.

=== Shelbourne ===
On 6 November 2019 Shelbourne announced the signing of Sheppard following his departure from Cork City. The season ended in disappointment for Sheppard and Shelbourne, as the club were relegated back to the League of Ireland First Division while Sheppard failed to score in his 13 appearances in all competitions over the season. On the 17th January 2021, Sheppard announced his retirement from the game aged just 29, with Arthritis struggles cited as his reason for the decision.

== International career ==
While a Shelbourne player, Sheppard scored the fifth goal in Republic of Ireland U16's 5–2 win over Japan at the Montaigu Tournament in 2007. Sheppard also represented his country at U17 level where he scored after coming on as a substitute at Terryland Park in a 2008 UEFA European Under-17 Football Championship qualifying round.

In the elite phase of the 2010 UEFA European Under-19 Football Championship elite qualification Sheppard played in all three games in Ukraine as Ireland narrowly missed out on qualification.

Sheppard made a substitute appearance for the League of Ireland XI in a 7–1 defeat to Manchester United in the first game to be played at the Aviva Stadium in August 2010.

In September 2010 he was called up to the Republic of Ireland under-21 national football team for the final 2011 UEFA European Under-21 Football Championship qualifier in Turkey but did not make an appearance.

Sheppard made his U21 debut in November 2011 in a 2013 UEFA European Under-21 Football Championship win over Liechtenstein.

== Career statistics ==
Professional appearances updated 17 January 2021.

Club	Division	Season	League		National Cup		League Cup		Europe		Other		Total	
Club	Division	Season	Apps	Goals	Apps	Goals	Apps	Goals	Apps	Goals	Apps	Goals	Apps	Goals
Galway United	League of Ireland Premier Division	2010	33	8	4	1	1	0	—		1 (Note: Appearances in the League of Ireland promotion/relegation playoff)	1	39	10
Shamrock Rovers	League of Ireland Premier Division	2011	24	10	3	1	0	0	5 (Note: Appearances in the UEFA Europa League)	1	5 (Note: Appearances in the Setanta Sports Cup)	3	37	15
Reading	EFL Championship	2011–12	0	0	0	0	0	0	—		—		0	0
Accrington Stanley (loan)	EFL League Two	2012–13	10	1	0	0	1	0	—		1 (Note: Appearances in the EFL Trophy)	0	12	1
Shamrock Rovers (loan)	League of Ireland Premier Division	2013	26	5	4	0	2	1	—		10 (Note: 6 appearances, 1 goal in the Setanta Sports Cup, 4 appearances, 2 goals in the Leinster Senior Cup)	3	42	9
Shamrock Rovers	League of Ireland Premier Division	2014	19	1	5	2	2	0	—		4 (Note: 3 appearances in the Setanta Sports Cup, 1 appearance, 1 goal in the Leinster Senior Cup)	1	30	4
Shamrock Rovers	Shamrock Rovers Total		69	16	12	3	4	1	5	1	19	7	109	28
Shamrock Rovers B (loan)	League of Ireland First Division	2014	2	0	—		—		—		—		2	0
Cork City	League of Ireland Premier Division	2015	31	13	6	0	0	0	2	0	1 (Note: Appearances in the Munster Senior Cup)	1	40	14
Cork City	League of Ireland Premier Division	2016	28	8	4	2	1	0	3	0	2 (Note: 1 appearance in the President's Cup, 1 appearance in the Munster Senior Cup)	0	38	10
Cork City	League of Ireland Premier Division	2017	33	9	5	3	1	0	4	1	2 (Note: 1 appearance & 1 goal in the President's Cup, 1 appearance & 2 goals in the Munster Senior Cup)	3	45	16
Cork City	League of Ireland Premier Division	2018	31	6	4	1	0	0	4 (Note: 2 appearances in the UEFA Champions League, 2 appearances in the UEFA Europa League)	0	3 (Note: 1 appearance & 1 goal in the President's Cup, 2 appearances & 1 goal in the Munster Senior Cup)	2	42	9
Cork City	League of Ireland Premier Division	2019	27	3	2	0	0	0	2	0	1	1	32	4
Cork City	Cork City Total		150	39	21	6	2	0	15	1	9	7	197	53
Shelbourne	League of Ireland Premier Division	2020	11	0	1	0	—		—		1 (Note: Appearances in the League of Ireland promotion/relegation play-off)	0	13	0
Career Total			275	64	38	10	8	1	20	2	31	15	372	92

== Honours ==
Shamrock Rovers

- LOI Premier Division: 2011
- Setanta Sports Cup: 2011, 2013

Cork City

- LOI Premier Division: 2017
- FAI President's Cup (3): 2016, 2017, 2018
- FAI Cup (2): 2016, 2017
- Fingal Sportsman of the year: 2017
