= Gary McCabe =

Irish footballer (born 1988)

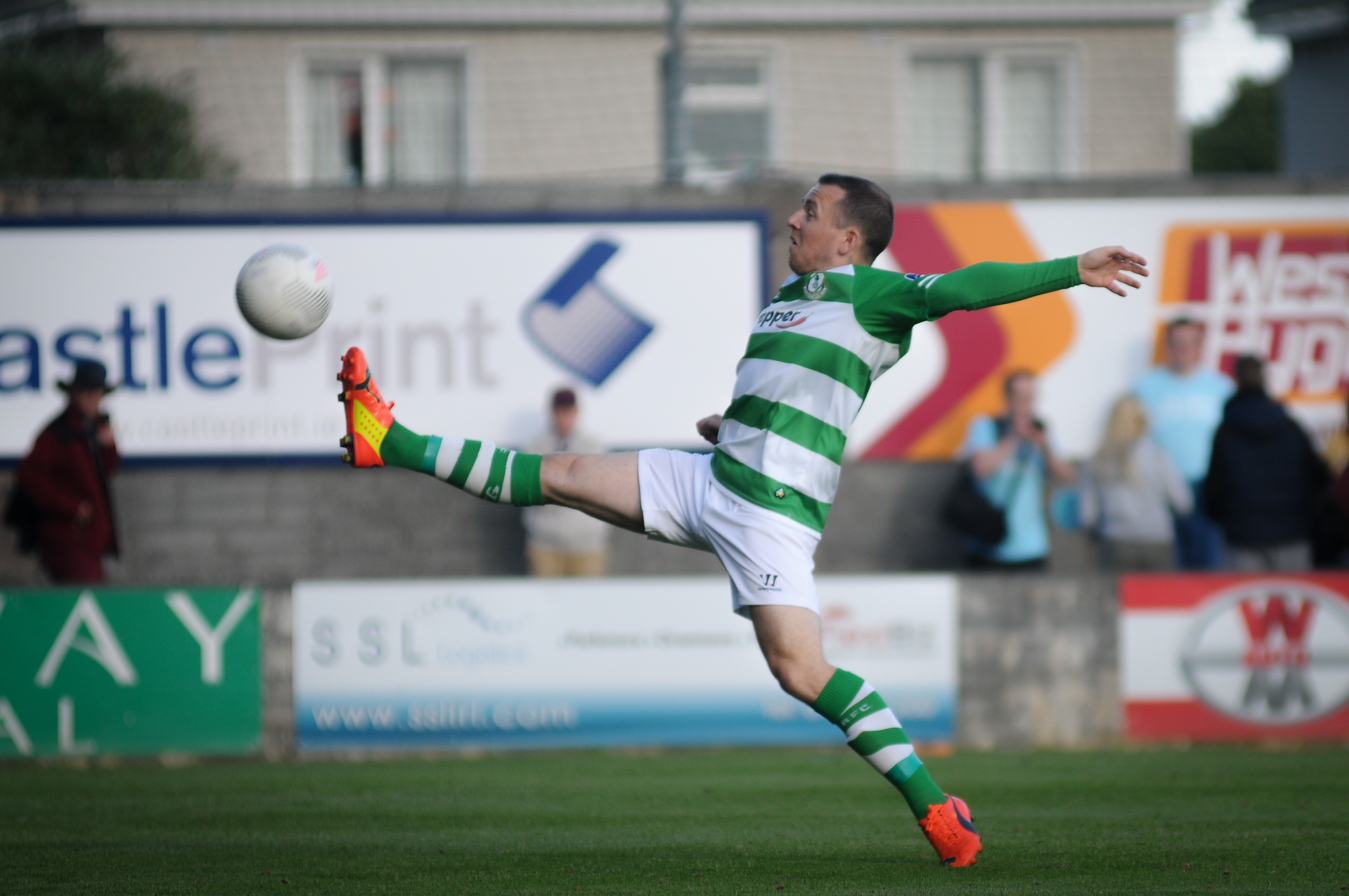
- Gary McCabe in action for Shamrock Rovers against Galway United during the 2015 League of Ireland Premier Division season

Personal information
- Date of birth: 1 August 1988 (age 38)
- Place of birth: Dublin, Ireland
- Position: Winger

Youth career
- Shelbourne
- Crumlin United

Senior career*
Years	Team	Apps	(Gls)
2007–2009	Bray Wanderers	61	(7)
2008	→ Shelbourne (loan)	9	(0)
2010	Sligo Rovers	33	(4)
2011–2016	Shamrock Rovers	170	(42)
2017–2018	Bray Wanderers	54	(19)
- * Club domestic league appearances and goals

Gary McCabe (born 1 August 1988) is an Irish retired footballer who last played for Bray Wanderers as a winger.

== Career ==
McCabe began his youth career at Leinster Senior League side Crumlin United. His impressive performances in the youth and intermediate ranks did not go unnoticed and attracted interest from a number of League of Ireland clubs. McCabe was eventually snapped up by Premier Division outfit Bray Wanderers for the 2007 season. McCabe broke straight into Bray's first team that season making 24 league and cup appearances and scoring 2 goals helping the Seagulls to league safety with a 9th place league finish. He scored his first Bray goal at the age of 18 during a 2–1 victory over UCD at the Carlisle Grounds on 29 May 2007.

The 2008 season started as a difficult season for McCabe. Despite Bray flying as high as 4th in Premier Division table, the left sided winger struggled for form and discipline getting sent off twice in just 9 league appearances. To regain first team football, Bray sent the young winger out on loan to First Division title chasing side Shelbourne for the remainder of the 2008 season. McCabe made his Shelbourne debut as a second-half substitute during a 2–0 defeat to Limerick 37 at Tolka Park on 11 July 2008. McCabe made 9 competitive appearances for Shelbourne during his loan spell and he impressed the Shelbourne faithful with his pace and skill.

During this time he represented Republic of Ireland national futsal team in the qualifying rounds of the 2010 UEFA Futsal Championship. He returned to Bray Wanderers following his loan spell at Shelbourne. McCabe had a revitalised season in 2009 as he finished Bray's top scorer contributing 8 goals in 38 league and cup appearances.

At the end of the season McCabe signed for Sligo Rovers in December 2009.

In 2010 McCabe played a vital part in Sligo Rovers' hugely successful season as they finished in 3rd place in the league and also won the League of Ireland Cup and the FAI Cup. However, McCabe's contract expired at the end of the 2010 season and he signed for The Hoops in January 2011.

He made his League debut for the Hoops in the opening night win over Dundalk.

He won the Setanta Cup in 2011 and played in the 2011–12 UEFA Europa League netting a memorable equaliser against Partizan Belgrade in August 2011 McCabe scored in the 2–1 away defeat against FK Ekranas on 25 July 2012 in the UEFA Champions League qualifying rounds. This goal was the 100th all time goal in this competition for League of Ireland clubs.

He signed a two-year contract in November 2012.

== Personal life ==
His sister Katie is captain of the Republic of Ireland women's national football team.

== Career statistics ==
As of 27 August 2019

Appearances and goals by club, season and competition
Club	Season	League			Cup		League Cup		Europe		Other		Total	
Club	Season	Division	Apps	Goals	Apps	Goals	Apps	Goals	Apps	Goals	Apps	Goals	Apps	Goals
Bray Wanderers	2007	League of Ireland Premier Division	22	1	2	1	1	0	–		–		25	2
Bray Wanderers	2008	League of Ireland Premier Division	9	0	1	0	2	0	–		–		12	0
Shelbourne (loan)	2008	League of Ireland First Division	9	0	–		–		–		–		9	0
Bray Wanderers	2009	League of Ireland Premier Division	30	6	5	2	0	0	–		3 (Note: Appearances in League of Ireland Promotion/relegation playoffs)	0	38	8
Sligo Rovers	2010	League of Ireland Premier Division	33	4	4	0	4	0	–		2 (Note: Appearances in Setanta Sports Cup)	0	43	4
Shamrock Rovers	2011	League of Ireland Premier Division	31	6	4	2	0	0	8 (Note: 3 appearances in UEFA Champions League, 5 appearances 1 goal in UEFA Europa League)	1	2	0	45	9
Shamrock Rovers	2012	League of Ireland Premier Division	26	8	3	0	3	2	2 (Note: Appearances in UEFA Champions League)	1	3 (Note: 2 appearances in Setanta Sports Cup, 1 appearance in Leinster Senior Cup)	0	37	11
Shamrock Rovers	2013	League of Ireland Premier Division	28	8	3	0	4	3	–		11 (Note: 7 appearances in Setanta Sports Cup, 4 appearances 1 goal in Leinster Senior Cup)	1	46	12
Shamrock Rovers	2014	League of Ireland Premier Division	31	8	4	2	3	0	–		4 (Note: 3 appearances 1 goal in Setanta Sports Cup, 1 appearance 1 goals in Leinster Senior Cup)	2	42	12
Shamrock Rovers	2015	League of Ireland Premier Division	26	2	1	1	3	0	4 (Note: Appearances in UEFA Europa League)	0	2 (Note: Appearances in Leinster Senior Cup)	0	36	3
Shamrock Rovers	2016	League of Ireland Premier Division	28	10	3	1	2	0	2	1	0	0	35	12
Shamrock Rovers	Total		170	42	18	6	5	0	16	3	22	3	241	59
Bray Wanderers	2017	League of Ireland Premier Division	30	15	1	0	1	0	–		1 (Note: Appearances in Scottish Challenge Cup)	0	33	15
Bray Wanderers	2018	League of Ireland Premier Division	24	4	0	0	1	0	–		1	0	26	4
Bray Wanderers	Total		115	26	9	3	5	0	—		5	0	134	29
Career total			327	72	31	9	24	5	16	3	27	3	418	90

== Honours ==
Sligo Rovers

- FAI Cup (1): 2010
- League of Ireland Cup (1): 2010

Shamrock Rovers

- League of Ireland (1): 2011
- Setanta Sports Cup (2): 2011, 2013
