= Karl Moore (footballer) =

Irish footballer

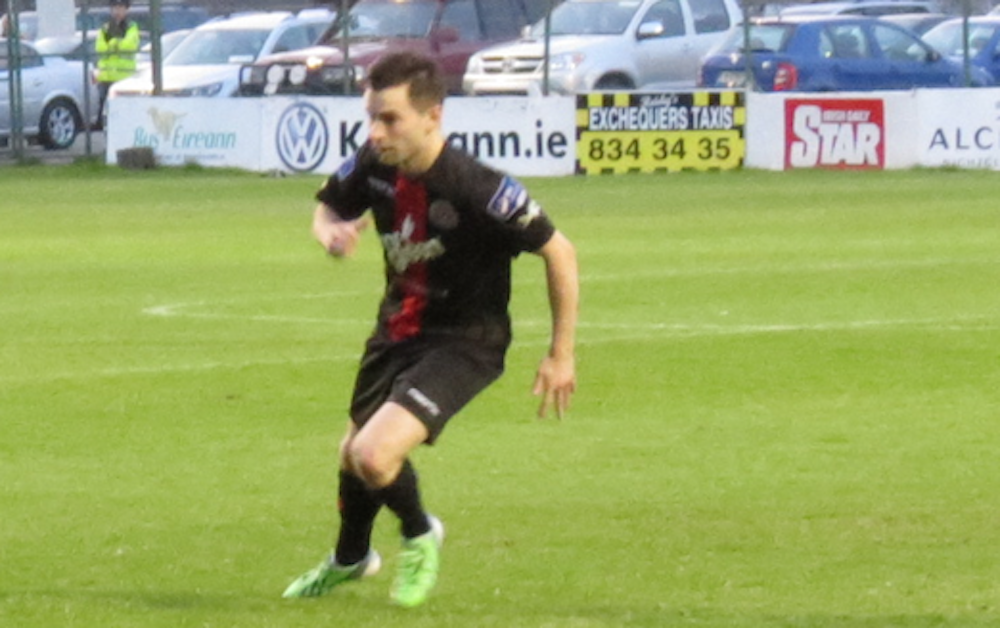
- Moore playing for Bohemians in 2014

Personal information
- Date of birth: 9 November 1988 (age 38)
- Place of birth: Dublin, Ireland
- Height: 5 ft 7 in (1.70 m)
- Position: Winger

Youth career
- –2004: St. Kevin's
- 2004–2007: Manchester City

Senior career*
Years	Team	Apps	(Gls)
2007–2010	Manchester City	0	(0)
2008–2009	→ Millwall (loan)	6	(0)
2010	UCD	10	(0)
2011	Galway United	21	(0)
2011	Shamrock Rovers	3	(0)
2012–2015	Bohemians	117	(6)
2016–2017	Bray Wanderers	34	(3)
2018	Bohemians	11	(0)
2018–2020	Shelbourne	34	(6)

International career
2006	Republic of Ireland U17	8	(2)
2007–2008	Republic of Ireland U19	6	(1)
2008–2010	Republic of Ireland U21	4	(0)
- * Club domestic league appearances and goals

Karl Moore (born 19 November 1988) is an Irish former professional footballer who played as a winger.

== Career ==
Born in Dublin, Moore began his career at his local side St. Kevin's Boys. At the age of 16 he joined Manchester City. At Manchester City he lived with Micah Richards.

Moore was part of the Manchester City youth side beaten 3–2 by Liverpool in the final of the FA Youth Cup in 2006. On 29 August 2008, he went out on loan from Manchester City to Millwall until January 2009 and made his début for the London club the very next day in Millwall's 2–1 home win against Huddersfield Town. He went on to make a total of nine appearances for the Lions during his loan spell there.

On 8 June 2010, Moore was released along with Martin Petrov, Sylvinho, Jack Redshaw and Benjani. In August that year, Moore returned home to join UCD in a bid to regain fitness and match sharpness as he stepped up his return from injury. Moore made his League of Ireland debut for UCD AFC in a game against Sligo Rovers as a late substitute and soon became a regular with the students. Moore left UCD AFC at the end of the 2010 season, despite being asked to stay on.

In February 2011 Moore signed a one-year deal with Connacht outfit Galway United, although there was also interest from several other League of Ireland clubs.

It was rumoured, on 12 June 2011, that Moore may make a return to British football, with SPL club Motherwell understood to be leading the chase for his signature.

However, on 3 August, it was announced that Moore had signed for Airtricity League Champions, Shamrock Rovers, after leaving Galway United due to financial troubles at the club.

Moore joined Rovers' fierce rivals Bohemians on 13 January 2012, and scored on his competitive debut against Portadown in the Setanta Cup. His first league goals for the club came on 29 June when he netted a brace in a 4–0 thumping of Shamrock Rovers at Dalymount Park. Despite interest from other clubs, Moore signed a new one-year contract with Bohs at the end of the 2012 season.

== Later life ==
Moore studied for A-Levels in maths, accountancy and economics while living in Manchester. He later studied accountancy at Manchester University, finished his studies in Dublin, and as of October 2021 was working as a commercial finance analyst.
