= Dean Kelly (footballer) =

Irish footballer (born 1985)

Personal information
- Date of birth: 18 September 1985 (age 41)
- Place of birth: Dublin, Ireland
- Position: Forward

Youth career
- WFTA

Senior career*
| Years | Team | Apps | (Gls) |
- Tolka Rovers
| 2009–2010 | Crumlin United | | |
| 2010–2011 | Oldham Athletic | 13 | (1) |
| 2011 | Shamrock Rovers | 11 | (1) |
| 2012 | St Patrick's Athletic | 13 | (2) |
| 2013 | Shelbourne | 26 | (9) |
| 2014 | Shamrock Rovers | 15 | (4) |
| 2015 | Bohemians | 16 | (5) |
| 2015 | Longford Town | 12 | (4) |
| 2016 | Bray Wanderers | 14 | (3) |
- * Club domestic league appearances and goals

Dean Kelly (born 18 September 1985) is an Irish former footballer who played for Oldham Athletic, Shamrock Rovers, St Patrick's Athletic, Shelbourne, Bohemians, Longford Town and Bray Wanderers.

== Career ==
=== Early career ===
Kelly played youth football for WFTA FC in Finglas reaching the SFAI finals at under 13 and 15 levels and scoring in a Play-off to win the under 16 Premier League in the DDSL. He played for Tolka Rovers in the Leinster Senior League before joining Crumlin United for the 2009–10 season. It was a successful season in which his team won the Intermediate Cup, the Charlie Cahill and the Metropolitan, as well as the Leinster League Premier Division. Despite missing 14 weeks with a knee injury, Kelly finished top scorer with 35 goals.

Whilst playing as an amateur he worked as a builder for Dublin City Council.

=== Oldham Athletic ===
On 30 July 2010 he signed on a 6-month contract for the English side Oldham Athletic after impressing manager Paul Dickov in a trial period. He scored his first and only Football League goal on 30 October 2010 in 4–2 victory over Plymouth Argyle. He was released on 13 January 2011 after his short-term contract was completed having made fifteen appearances.

=== Shamrock Rovers ===
On 31 January 2011 Kelly signed for defending League of Ireland Champions Shamrock Rovers. He made his League of Ireland debut as a substitute for the Hoops in the opening night win over Dundalk on 4 March 2011. His first goal for the club came on his full debut on 14 March as the club beat Lisburn Distillery 3–0 in the first leg quarter-final match of the Setanta Sports Cup. In October 2011 Kelly scored a late goal against UCD to clinch the 2011 league title for Shamrock Rovers. In January 2012 he signed a new one-year contract with the club.

Kelly was released by mutual agreement in February 2012. He had scored 4 times in 4 competitions in a total of 21 appearances.

=== St Patrick's Athletic ===
Kelly signed for League of Ireland club St Patrick's Athletic for the 2012 season. He scored his first goal for the club on his debut against Bray Wanderers on the opening day of the season in a 1–0 win at Richmond Park. Kelly followed this up with an assist for Stephen O'Flynn away to Dundalk at Oriel Park. The following Friday Kelly scored again at home against Monaghan United, but he was sent-off before half time.

=== Shelbourne ===
In December 2012 he signed for Shelbourne and appeared 31 times for the club, scoring 13 goals.

=== Shamrock Rovers ===
Kelly re-joined Rovers in February 2014. He was released at the end of the season.

=== Bohemians ===
Kelly joined Bohs ahead of the 2015 season meaning that he lined out for the 4 main Dublin League of Ireland clubs in successive years. His stint was short lived however, as he left the Gypsies in July 2015 despite having netted 5 times in 16 appearances.

=== Longford Town ===
Following his release from Bohs, Kelly immediately signed for midland's club Longford Town.

=== Bray Wanderers ===
After only half a season at Longford, Kelly joined Bray Wanderers in December 2015.

== International career ==
Kelly represented the Republic of Ireland in the Amateur European Championships, where he scored a hat trick to help the Irish qualify for the finals. In his next match for the team in April 2009 he then scored 4 goals as the Irish team beat Sardinian team Calinganis 5–1. In the UEFA Regions Finals in Croatia in 2009 he appeared in all three matches, against Spain, Bosnia and Belgium, where he scored a last minute goal.

In May 2010 he played against the Republic of Ireland national football team.

== Honours ==
League of Ireland

- Shamrock Rovers – 2011

Setanta Cup

- Shamrock Rovers – 2011

FAI Intermediate Cup

- Crumlin United – 2010

Leinster Senior League

- Crumlin United – 2010

Cahill Cup

- Crumlin United – 2010

Metro Cup

- Crumlin United – 2010
