= 2011 Setanta Sports Cup =

Tournament details
- Country: Northern Ireland; Republic of Ireland
- Teams: 12

Final positions
- Champions: Shamrock Rovers (1st title)
- Runners-up: Dundalk

Tournament statistics
- Matches played: 21
- Goals scored: 69 (3.29 per match)

The 2011 Setanta Sports Cup was the sixth staging of the Setanta Sports Cup, an association football competition featuring clubs from Northern Ireland and the Republic of Ireland. It commenced on 14 February 2011 with the final played on 14 May 2011.

The draw for the 2011 competition was made at Belfast City Hall on 13 December 2010.

== Changes to structure ==
For the 2011 competition, the Setanta Cup was expanded to 12 teams, of which the four highest ranked teams received a bye into the quarter-finals. Also unlike previous years the tournament was played as a straight knock-out competition over two legs apart from the final.

== Television coverage ==
Setanta Sports broadcast live coverage of five games, starting with the quarter-finals.

== First round ==
Four League of Ireland and Four IFA Premiership teams played each other in the first round over two games with the winners qualifying for the quarter-finals. The first legs were played on 14 February/21 February/1 March 2011 and the second legs were played on 28 February/1 March/7 March 2011. Sporting Fingal had originally been scheduled to compete in the tournament against Lisburn Distillery but withdrew on 9 February due to financial difficulties which saw them fold the following day and were replaced by UCD.

Team 1	Agg.	Team 2	1st leg	2nd leg
Linfield (Northern Ireland)	4−6	(Republic of Ireland) Dundalk	3−5	1−1
UCD (Republic of Ireland)	0−2	(Northern Ireland) Lisburn Distillery	0−0	0−2
Cliftonville (Northern Ireland)	3−2	(Republic of Ireland) St Patrick's Athletic	3−0	0−2
Bohemians (Republic of Ireland)	1−4	(Northern Ireland) Portadown	1−2	0−2

=== First leg ===
14 February 2011
19.45

Linfield	3 – 5	Dundalk
Thompson 43'; Garrett 64'; Allen 81'	Report	Kearns 31', 66', 90+2'; Quigley 54', 75'

Windsor Park
Referee: Stephen Weatherall (Antrim)

14 February 2011
19.45

UCD	0 – 0	Lisburn Distillery
	Report

Dalymount Park
Attendance: 150
Referee: Derek Tomney (Dublin)

21 February 2011
19.45

Cliftonville	3 − 0	St Patrick's Athletic
McMullan 31', 49'; O'Connor 42'	Report

Solitude
Attendance: 400
Referee: Davie Malcolm

1 March 2011
19.45

Bohemians	1 − 2	Portadown
Somers 63'; Brennan (red card) 77'	Report	Braniff 45'; O'Hara 59'

Dalymount Park
Attendance: 800
Referee: Tom Connolly

=== Second leg ===
28 February 2011
20.00

Dundalk	1 − 1	Linfield
Gaynor 11'	Report	Gault 45+3'

Oriel Park
Attendance: 2250
Referee: Damien Hancock

Dundalk won 6 − 4 on aggregate

28 February 2011
19.45

Lisburn Distillery	2 − 0	UCD
Browne 18' (pen.); Davidson 86'	Report

New Grosvenor Stadium
Referee: Colin Burns

Distillery won 2 − 0 on aggregate.

1 March 2011
19.45

St Patrick's Athletic	2 − 0	Cliftonville
Mulcahy 41'; McMillan 80'	Report

Richmond Park
Attendance: 1000
Referee: Derek Tomney (Dublin)

Cliftonville won 3 − 2 on aggregate.

7 March 2011
19.45

Portadown	2 − 0	Bohemians
Baker 10'; Mouncey 47'	Report

Shamrock Park

Portadown won 4−1 on aggregate

== Quarter−Finals ==
The winners of the four first-round games joined the four seeded teams (Shamrock Rovers, Sligo Rovers, Crusaders and Glentoran) who received a Bye into the quarter-finals. The first legs were played on 7 March/14 March/28 March 2011 and the second legs were played on 21 March/22 March/4 April 2011.

Team 1	Agg.	Team 2	1st leg	2nd leg
Glentoran (Northern Ireland)	1−2	(Republic of Ireland) Dundalk	0−1	1−1
Cliftonville (Northern Ireland)	10−6	(Northern Ireland) Crusaders	4−2	6−4
Lisburn Distillery (Northern Ireland)	2−7	(Republic of Ireland) Shamrock Rovers	0−3	2−4
Sligo Rovers (Republic of Ireland)	5−0	(Northern Ireland) Portadown	3−0	2−0

=== First leg ===
7 March 2011
19.45

Glentoran	0 − 1	Dundalk
	Report	Quigley 82'

The Oval
Referee: Arnold Hunter (Fermanagh)

14 March 2011
19.45

Cliftonville	4 − 2	Crusaders
McMullan 24'; McVeigh 71'; Garrett 85'; Holland 86'	Report	Magee 32'; Halliday 54'; Gibson (red card) 79'

Solitude

14 March 2011
19.45

Lisburn Distillery	0 − 3	Shamrock Rovers
Cooling (red card) 78'	Report	Sheppard 35'; Kilduff 40'; Kelly 68'

New Grosvenor Stadium

28 March 2011
19.45

Sligo Rovers	3 − 0	Portadown
Dillon 21'; Russell 58'; Cretaro 90'	Report

Sligo Showgrounds
Referee: T.Connolly

=== Second leg ===
21 March 2011
19.55

Dundalk	1 − 1	Glentoran
Gaynor 80'	Report	Burrows 59' (pen.); Taylor (red card) 79'

Oriel Park
Attendance: 2100
Referee: Richie Winter (Dublin)

Dundalk won 2−1 on aggregate

21 March 2011
19.45

Crusaders	4 − 6	Cliftonville
Sweeney 13'; Faulkner 18'; Caddell 39', 74'	Report	O'Connor 5', 20'; Holland 10'; McMullan 54' (pen.); Garrett 61'; Donnelly 89'

Seaview

Cliftonville won 10−6 on aggregate

22 March 2011
19.45

Shamrock Rovers	4 − 2	Lisburn Distillery
Kilduff 42'; Rice 47'; Kavanagh 82', 89'	Report	Liggett 14', 57'

Tallaght Stadium
Attendance: 500
Referee: Neil Doyle

Shamrock Rovers won 7−2 on aggregate.

4 April 2011
19.45

Portadown	0 − 2	Sligo Rovers
	Report	Horgan 40'; Ndo 75'

Shamrock Park

Sligo Rovers won 5−0 on aggregate

== Semi−Finals ==
The four winners of the quarter-final games played each other over two games for a place in the 2011 Setanta Sports Cup final. The first legs were played on 4 April/11 April 2011 and the second legs were played on 18 April/19 April 2011. The draw for the semi-finals was made on 23 March 2011.

Team 1	Agg.	Team 2	1st leg	2nd leg
Cliftonville (Northern Ireland)	2−5	(Republic of Ireland) Dundalk	1−3	1−2
Sligo Rovers (Republic of Ireland)	1−4	(Republic of Ireland) Shamrock Rovers	0−2	1−2

=== First leg ===
4 April 2011
19.45

Cliftonville	1 − 3	Dundalk
McMullan 24'	Report	Quigley 49', 82'; Kearns 73'

Solitude
Attendance: 750
Referee: Damien Hancock

11 April 2011
19.45

Sligo Rovers	0 − 2	Shamrock Rovers
Russell (red card) 74'	Report	Finn 27'; Sheppard 58'

Sligo Showgrounds
Referee: Alan Kelly

=== Second leg ===
18 April 2011
19.45

Dundalk	2 − 1	Cliftonville
Byrne 67'; Breen 90+3'	Report	O'Connor 59'

Oriel Park
Referee: Alan Black (Antrim)

Dundalk won 5−2 on aggregate

19 April 2011
19.45

Shamrock Rovers	2 − 1	Sligo Rovers
Sheppard 8'; Dennehy 25'	Report	Doyle 4'

Tallaght Stadium
Referee: Raymond Crangle

Shamrock Rovers won 4−1 on aggregate

== Final ==
The two winners of the semi-final games played each other over one game to decide who would be crowned Setanta Sports Cup winners for 2011. The final took place on Saturday 14 May 2011 in Tallaght Stadium. Shamrock Rovers beat Dundalk to win the competition for the first time.

=== Match ===
14 May 2011
18.15 IST

Dundalk	0 – 2	Shamrock Rovers
	Report	O'Neill 65'; Dennehy 90+3'

Tallaght Stadium
Attendance: 4,789
Referee: Alan Kelly

Winner of 2011 Setanta Sports Cup
(Republic of Ireland) Shamrock Rovers
1st Title

== Goalscorers ==
5 goals

- (Republic of Ireland) Mark Quigley (Dundalk)
- (Northern Ireland) George McMullan (Cliftonville)

4 goals

- (Northern Ireland) Kieran O'Connor (Cliftonville)
- (Republic of Ireland) Daniel Kearns (Dundalk)

3 goals

- (Republic of Ireland) Karl Sheppard (Shamrock Rovers)

2 goals

- (Northern Ireland) Declan Caddell (Crusaders)
- (Republic of Ireland) Billy Dennehy (Shamrock Rovers)
- (Northern Ireland) Stephen Garrett (Cliftonville)
- (Republic of Ireland) Ross Gaynor (Dundalk)
- (Northern Ireland) Mark Holland (Cliftonville)
- (Republic of Ireland) Patrick Kavanagh (Shamrock Rovers)
- (Republic of Ireland) Ciarán Kilduff (Shamrock Rovers)
- (Northern Ireland) Gary Liggett (Lisburn Distillery)

1 goal

- (Northern Ireland) Curtis Allen (Linfield)
- (Northern Ireland) Jordan Baker (Portadown)
- (Northern Ireland) Kevin Braniff (Portadown)
- (Republic of Ireland) Johnny Breen (Dundalk)
- (Northern Ireland) Gary Browne (Lisburn Distillery)
- (Northern Ireland) Matty Burrows (Glentoran)
- (Republic of Ireland) Jason Byrne (Dundalk)
- (Republic of Ireland) Raffaele Cretaro (Sligo Rovers)
- (Northern Ireland) Scott Davidson (Lisburn Distillery)
- (Republic of Ireland) John Dillon (Sligo Rovers)
- (Republic of Ireland) Eoin Doyle (Sligo Rovers)
- (Northern Ireland) Rory Donnelly (Cliftonville)
- (Northern Ireland) William Faulkner (Crusaders)
- (Republic of Ireland) Ronan Finn (Shamrock Rovers)
- (Northern Ireland) Robert Garrett (Linfield)
- (Northern Ireland) Michael Gault (Linfield)
- (Northern Ireland) Michael Halliday (Crusaders)
- (Republic of Ireland) Daryl Horgan (Sligo Rovers)
- (Republic of Ireland) Dean Kelly (Shamrock Rovers)
- (Northern Ireland) Jonathan Magee (Crusaders)
- (Republic of Ireland) David McMillan (St Patrick's Athletic)
- (Northern Ireland) Dermot McVeigh (Cliftonville)
- (Northern Ireland) Tim Mouncey (Portadown)
- (Republic of Ireland) Dave Mulcahy (St Patrick's Athletic)
- (Cameroon) Joseph Ndo (Sligo Rovers)
- (Northern Ireland) Keith O'Hara (Portadown)
- (Republic of Ireland) Gary O'Neill (Shamrock Rovers)
- (Republic of Ireland) Stephen Rice (Shamrock Rovers)
- (Republic of Ireland) John Russell (Sligo Rovers)
- (Republic of Ireland) Karl Somers (Bohemians)
- (Northern Ireland) Vincent Sweeney (Crusaders)
- (Northern Ireland) Peter Thompson (Linfield)
