= Aidan Downes =

Irish professional footballer

Personal information
- Date of birth: 24 July 1988 (age 38)
- Place of birth: Dublin, Ireland
- Positions: Winger; striker

Team information
- Current team: Mornington SC

Youth career
- –2005: Tolka Rovers

Senior career*
Years	Team	Apps	(Gls)
2005–2008	Everton	0	(0)
2008	→ Yeovil Town (loan)	5	(1)
2008–2010	Yeovil Town	29	(0)
2010	Shamrock Rovers	0	(0)
2011	Bohemians	13	(2)
2014–	Mornington	0	(0)

International career
2007	Republic of Ireland U21	3	(1)
- * Club domestic league appearances and goals

Aidan Downes (born 24 July 1988) is an Irish professional footballer who plays for Mornington SC, a club based in Melbourne, Australia.

== Career ==
=== Everton ===
Downes joined Everton's Academy in 2005 from Tolka Rovers in his native Ireland. Everton paid Tolka £90,000 compensation to secure the signature of the youngster.

Aidan quickly progressed through the youth set-up at Everton until an injury suffered at the end of the 2005/2006 season slowed him down. In the latter part of the season, Downes linked up with Yeovil on loan, scoring his first senior goal at Swansea. Everton released the striker at the end of the season.

=== Yeovil Town ===
After spending a spell on loan at League One side Yeovil Town, for whom he made his debut in the Football League, he was released by Everton at the end of the 2007–08 season.

On 21 May 2008 it was announced that Downes had signed for Yeovil on a permanent basis on a two-year contract. He joined officially on 1 July 2008 when his contract expired. He quickly impressed both management and fans during his time at Huish Park, especially at the Liberty Stadium where he scored a vital goal against League One Champions Swansea City, which in turn guaranteed safety in League One for the Glovers. He remained at the club for two seasons until 13 May 2010 when he was released along with three other players.

=== Shamrock Rovers ===
Downes joined Shamrock Rovers on 31 August 2010 until the end of the season and made his debut as a substitute in the FAI Cup on 17 September.

=== Bohemians ===
Aidan spent part of the 2011 season training with Bohemians and signed for Pat Fenlon's men in June of that year on amateur terms. He made his debut for the club in a 3–1 win over Dundalk at Oriel Park on 1 July.

== International career ==
Downes has represented the Republic of Ireland at under16-17-18-19 level, and in October 2007, he made his under-21 debut, scoring a goal in the process.
