= 2011 League of Ireland Premier Division =

League of Ireland Premier Division
- Season: 2011
- Champions: Shamrock Rovers (17th title)
- Relegated: Galway United
- UEFA Champions League: Shamrock Rovers
- UEFA Europa League: Sligo Rovers; St. Patrick's Athletic; Bohemians
- Setanta Cup: Shamrock Rovers; Bohemians; Sligo Rovers; St. Patrick's Athletic; Derry City; Bray Wanderers
- Matches: 180
- Goals: 503 (2.79 per match)
- Top goalscorer: Éamon Zayed: 22 (Derry City)
- Biggest home win: Derry City 7–0 UCD
- Biggest away win: Galway United 0–8 Sligo Rovers
- Highest scoring: UCD 5–4 Drogheda United
- Longest winning run: Shamrock Rovers, Sligo Rovers (5 games each)
- Longest unbeaten run: Derry City (18 games)
- Longest winless run: Galway United (32 games)
- Longest losing run: Galway United (22 games)

The 2011 League of Ireland Premier Division was the 27th season of the League of Ireland Premier Division. The league was also known as the Airtricity League for sponsorship reasons. The division featured 10 teams. Shamrock Rovers were champions while Sligo Rovers finished as runners-up.

2011 League of Ireland Premier Division teams
Locations of Dublin Premier Division teams

== Teams ==
Team	Location	Stadium
Bohemians	Phibsborough	Dalymount Park
Bray Wanderers	Bray	Carlisle Grounds
Derry City	Derry	Brandywell Stadium
Drogheda United	Drogheda	United Park
Dundalk	Dundalk	Oriel Park
Galway United	Galway	Terryland Park
Shamrock Rovers	Tallaght	Tallaght Stadium
Sligo Rovers	Sligo	The Showgrounds
St Patrick's Athletic	Inchicore	Richmond Park
UCD	Belfield	UCD Bowl

== Overview ==
The Premier Division consists of ten teams. Each team played every other team four times, twice at home and twice away, for a total of 36 matches. The league began on 4 March and ended on 29 October. Defending champions Shamrock Rovers retained the league title with victory over UCD on 25 October 2011.

== Final table ==
Pos	Team	Pld	W	D	L	GF	GA	GD	Pts	Qualification or relegation
1	Shamrock Rovers (C)	36	23	8	5	69	24	+45	77	Qualification for Champions League second qualifying round
2	Sligo Rovers	36	22	7	7	73	19	+54	73	Qualification for Europa League second qualifying round (Note: Sligo Rovers qualified for the UEFA Europa League second qualifying round after winning the 2011 FAI Cup Final.)
3	Derry City	36	18	14	4	63	23	+40	68	Banned from 2012–13 European competitions (Note: Derry City were banned from European competitions for three seasons after going into liquidation.)
4	St Patrick's Athletic	36	17	12	7	62	35	+27	63	Qualification for Europa League first qualifying round
5	Bohemians	36	17	9	10	39	27	+12	60	Qualification for Europa League first qualifying round
6	Bray Wanderers	36	15	6	15	53	50	+3	51	
7	Dundalk	36	11	11	14	50	53	−3	44	
8	UCD	36	10	4	22	42	80	−38	34	
9	Drogheda United	36	7	4	25	32	77	−45	25	
10	Galway United (Note: Galway United were originally relegated but subsequently withdrew from the league.)	36	1	3	32	20	115	−95	6	Qualification for relegation play-off

Rules for classification: 1) points; 2) goal difference; 3) number of goals scored.
(C) Champions

== Results ==
=== Matches 1–18 ===
Home \ Away	BOH	BRW	DER	DRO	DUN	GAL	SHM	SLI	StP	UCD
Bohemians	—	1–1	0–2	1–0	0–1	0–1	1–1	0–0	0–1	1–0
Bray Wanderers	1–3	—	1–2	2–1	1–5	2–0	1–0	0–0	0–1	2–1
Derry City	3–0	1–1	—	2–0	2–0	6–0	0–0	0–1	1–1	7–0
Drogheda United	0–1	0–1	2–2	—	1–2	1–1	0–4	0–3	1–4	0–1
Dundalk	0–0	0–0	1–0	1–2	—	3–2	1–1	1–1	1–2	3–1
Galway United	0–2	0–3	1–4	1–2	0–3	—	0–1	0–1	0–3	0–0
Shamrock Rovers	1–0	0–1	1–1	3–0	3–1	4–0	—	1–0	2–0	3–1
Sligo Rovers	1–2	3–1	3–0	2–0	1–0	3–0	0–1	—	2–0	4–0
St Patrick's Athletic	0–0	2–3	1–1	3–0	3–2	5–2	0–0	2–1	—	1–1
UCD	0–2	0–1	0–2	2–1	0–2	3–0	1–6	2–1	1–3	—

Source: www.rsssf.com
Legend: Blue = home team win; Yellow = draw; Red = away team win.

=== Matches 19–36 ===
Home \ Away	BOH	BRW	DER	DRO	DUN	GAL	SHM	SLI	StP	UCD
Bohemians	—	2–1	0–1	2–0	3–1	2–0	0–1	0–3	0–0	2–0
Bray Wanderers	1–2	—	1–2	1–2	1–0	4–0	1–2	0–3	0–3	4–0
Derry City	0–0	1–1	—	2–2	0–0	4–0	1–0	0–0	2–0	2–1
Drogheda United	0–2	1–4	0–3	—	2–2	1–0	0–1	0–3	4–3	3–1
Dundalk	1–3	2–2	0–2	1–0	—	6–1	1–2	1–1	0–2	2–0
Galway United	0–3	0–6	0–3	1–2	2–2	—	2–3	0–8	0–2	3–4
Shamrock Rovers	1–1	5–2	1–0	4–0	2–2	4–0	—	1–2	1–0	6–0
Sligo Rovers	1–2	3–0	1–1	2–0	5–0	7–1	2–0	—	0–0	4–2
St Patrick's Athletic	1–1	1–0	1–1	4–0	2–2	6–1	1–1	1–0	—	2–2
UCD	2–0	1–2	2–2	5–4	3–0	2–1	1–2	0–1	2–1	—

Source: www.rsssf.com
Legend: Blue = home team win; Yellow = draw; Red = away team win.

== Awards ==
=== Top goalscorers ===
Rank	Scorer	Club	Goals
1	(Libya) Éamon Zayed	Derry City	22
2	(Republic of Ireland) Eoin Doyle	Sligo Rovers	20
3	(England) Danny North	St. Patrick's Athletic	15
3	(Scotland) Gary Twigg	Shamrock Rovers	15
5	(Republic of Ireland) Mark Quigley	Dundalk	13

=== PFAI Players' Player of the Year ===
Winner	Club
(Libya) Éamon Zayed	Derry City

=== PFAI Young Player of the Year ===
Winner	Club
(Republic of Ireland) Enda Stevens	Shamrock Rovers

=== PFAI Team of the Year ===
No.	Pos.	Player	Date of birth (age)	Caps	Club
1	GK	Gerard Doherty			Derry City
2	DF	Patrick Sullivan			Shamrock Rovers
3	DF	Stewart Greacen			Derry City
4	DF	Craig Sives			Shamrock Rovers
5	DF	Enda Stevens			Shamrock Rovers
6	MF	Stephen Bradley			St Patrick's Athletic
7	MF	Daryl Kavanagh			St Patrick's Athletic
8	MF	Richie Ryan			Sligo Rovers
9	MF	Mark Quigley			Dundalk
10	FW	Éamon Zayed			Derry City
11	FW	Eoin Doyle			Sligo Rovers

=== Player of the Month ===
Month	Player	Club
March	(Republic of Ireland) Mark Quigley	Dundalk
April	(Republic of Ireland) Gary Dempsey	Bray Wanderers
May	(Republic of Ireland) Eoin Doyle	Sligo Rovers
June	(England) Danny North	St. Patrick's Athletic
July	(Republic of Ireland) Conor McCormack	Shamrock Rovers
August	(Republic of Ireland) Patrick Sullivan	Shamrock Rovers
September	(Cameroon) Joseph Ndo	Sligo Rovers
October	(Republic of Ireland) Karl Sheppard	Shamrock Rovers
November	(Republic of Ireland) Stephen Paisley (Note: Stephen Paisley was playing in First Division.)	Shelbourne

== Promotion/relegation play-off ==
Galway United, the tenth-placed team in the 2011 Premier Division, and Monaghan United, the third-placed team from the 2011 First Division, played off to see who would play in the 2012 Premier Division. The playoff was contested in a two-legged format.

1 November 2011	Monaghan United	2–0	Galway United	Kingspan Century Park
19.45 GMT	Isichei 13'; S. Brennan 87'

4 November 2011	Galway United	1–3	Monaghan United	Terryland Park
19.45 GMT	Murphy 82'		26', 33' O'Brien; 51' R. Brennan

Monaghan United won 5–1 on aggregate and were promoted to the Premier Division. Galway United were relegated to the First Division.

== See also ==
- 2011 Dundalk F.C. season
- 2011 Shamrock Rovers F.C. season
- 2011 League of Ireland First Division
- 2011 A Championship
- 2011 League of Ireland Cup
