= Setanta Sports Cup =

- Organiser(s): Irish Football Association; Football Association of Ireland
- Founded: 2005
- Abolished: 2014
- Region: Northern Ireland; Republic of Ireland
- Teams: 6–12
- Most championships: Drogheda United; Shamrock Rovers (2 titles each)
- Website: Setanta Sports Cup

The Setanta Sports Cup was a club football competition featuring teams from both football associations on the island of Ireland. Inaugurated in 2005, it was a cross-border competition between clubs in the League of Ireland from the Republic of Ireland and the NIFL Premiership from Northern Ireland. The cup was sponsored by Setanta Sports, the Irish subscription sports television network. The competition was discontinued after the 2014 edition. A successor competition, the Champions Cup, was announced in 2019.

== History ==
The Setanta Cup was the first cross-border competition since 1980. Previous competitions include the Dublin and Belfast Intercity Cup 1941–42 to 1948–49, the North-South Cup 1961–62 to 1962–63, the Blaxnit Cup 1967–68 to 1973–74, the Texaco Cup 1973–74 to 1974–75, and the Tyler Cup 1978–1980. The inaugural cup was played between March and May 2005 at the start of the League of Ireland season and the end of the IFA Premiership season.

The competition was launched with Setanta providing support for prize money (€350,000) and sponsorship (€1.6 million over four years). In June 2009, the company went into administration and ceased broadcasting in Great Britain, putting the future of the competition in doubt. The draw for the 2009 tournament was postponed for a month but the competition eventually continued. The competition saw instances of crowd violence at its games since its inception.

During the nine editions of the competition, the cup featured between six and twelve teams taking part. It began as a six-club competition called the Setanta Cup in 2005, before being expanded to eight clubs and renamed to the Setanta Sports Cup in 2006. The competition expanded again to nine clubs in 2009–10, and from 2011 until 2013 the competition was at its largest, with twelve clubs taking part. It was then reduced back to the 2006 number of eight clubs for the 2014 competition. The champions and runners-up from the respective leagues, and the winners of the respective cup competitions (FAI Cup and League of Ireland Cup from the League of Ireland, and the Irish Cup and NIFL Cup from the NIFL Premiership) qualified for the 2014 edition. If a club qualified via a cup win and would also have qualified by league table position, one of the spots would be awarded to the next highest club in the league table that had not already qualified. The 2014 competition was played in a two-legged knockout tie format up until the final. All four clubs from each league participated in the quarter-finals, with clubs from the same association being kept apart in the draw. The quarter-final winners again played a two-legged knockout tie in the semi-finals for a place in the final, which was a single game.

The 2014 competition was originally going to feature Linfield, who were inaugural winners of the competition in 2005 and had appeared in all eight competitions to date, and 2012–13 IFA Premiership champions Cliftonville. However, both clubs declined the invitation to take part, citing match scheduling and reduced prize money as their reasons for deciding not to enter. As a result, the fifth and sixth placed sides from the 2012–13 IFA Premiership, Ballinamallard United and Coleraine were invited to take their place, with both clubs accepting the invitation.

After the withdrawal of Linfield from the 2014 competition, Glentoran became the only club to have entered all nine competitions since its inception. A total of 21 different clubs appeared in the competition - 9 different clubs from Northern Ireland and 12 different clubs from the Republic of Ireland. Of those 21 clubs, twelve different clubs reached the final but only seven of them went on to win the cup, and only two clubs won the cup more than once. In the nine competitions, seven of them were won by a club from the Republic of Ireland, with only two winners being from Northern Ireland. On four occasions, the cup was won by a club making their first appearance in the competition. Linfield won the cup in their first appearance - the inaugural 2005 competition. This feat was repeated by Drogheda United during their first appearance in 2006, and in 2007 they became the only club to successfully retain the cup, and the first of two clubs to win the cup more than once. The feat was also repeated by Bohemians during their first appearance in 2009–10, and by Shamrock Rovers, when they won the cup during their first appearance in 2011. In 2013, they went on to become the second club to win the cup more than once.

== Editions ==
=== 2005 ===
For the inaugural competition, it was known simply as the Setanta Cup. Qualification for the 2005 cup was based on the national league and cup performances in the respective countries - the top two in each league and the winners of the FAI Cup and Irish Cup qualified. Teams were split into two groups with the winner of each qualifying for the final. The 2005 competition saw Cork City, Longford and Shelbourne represent the League of Ireland, and Glentoran, Linfield and Portadown represent the IFA Premiership. The eventual winners of the Cup, Linfield, started the campaign poorly losing 2–1 to Longford before going on to win their remaining group matches and beating pre-tournament favourites Shelbourne.

=== 2006 ===
The 2006 competition was renamed the Setanta Sports Cup, and featured four teams from each league with the winners of the respective secondary cup competitions, the League of Ireland Cup and Irish League Cup being added. The competition was organised with two groups of four teams. The top two teams in each group entered a semi-final round with the winner progressing to the final. The League of Ireland was represented by Cork City, Derry City, Shelbourne and Drogheda United with the IFA Premiership being represented by Linfield, Glentoran, Portadown and Dungannon Swifts. A total of 27 matches were played with the competition kicking off on Monday, 20 February 2006 with the final having been played on Saturday, 22 April 2006 at Tolka Park in Dublin. Drogheda United won, beating Cork City.

=== 2007 ===
The draw for the 2007 competition was made on 7 December 2006 with the original competing teams being the identical ones to the previous year's competition. On 30 January 2007 however, Shelbourne announced that they were withdrawing from the competition for reasons relating to their financial troubles and the fact that they would be unlikely to field a team of players. Their place was given to the 2006 FAI Cup runners-up St Patrick's Athletic.

The first round of matches commenced on Monday, 26 February 2007. The prize of £100,000 was on offer to the eventual competition winner, with the runner-up to receive £55,000. Linfield progressed from the first stage after finishing top of Group 1, guaranteeing them a home semi-final, while Drogheda United finished behind them. This meant that Drogheda had to travel away from home to meet the winners of Group 2, who were St. Patrick's Athletic. Meanwhile, Cork City, who finished second in Group 2 had to travel to Windsor Park to play Linfield. Both Linfield and St. Patrick's Athletic went through the group stage without a single defeat, while St. Patrick's Athletic even won five of their six games. The final, between Linfield and Drogheda at Windsor Park was decided by a penalty shoot-out. Drogheda claimed the trophy for a second consecutive year thanks to two penalty saves from Mikko Vilmunen.

=== 2008 ===
The draw for the 2008 competition was made on 17 January 2008, having been postponed since December 2007 to allow time for an agreement to be reached over the League of Ireland fixtures for 2008. For the third year in a row there were four representatives from each of the leagues with two from each league to be drawn in each group. In a change from previous years, the 2007 League of Ireland Cup winners played off against the winners of the 2007 League of Ireland First Division to decide the final League of Ireland place in the 2008 competition. As Derry City beat Cobh Ramblers 2–1 in the play-off on 19 November 2007, they claimed the remaining spot. The 2008 competition saw a change to the format with the first three group games in each group being played between late February and early April before the teams take a break from the competition until September. Between September and October the remaining group games and the semi-finals and final were played. The final took place on Saturday, 1 November 2008 at Turners Cross in Cork, where Cork City overcame Glentoran 2–1.

=== 2009–10 ===
"It is only fair for the tournament winners to be given the chance to defend their crown."

— Milo Corcoran, Chairman of Setanta Sports Cup Organising Committee

The 2009–10 season saw the competition expand to nine teams, including the holders, Cork City. There were three groups of three with the group winners and best runners-up qualifying for the semi-finals. The final took place on 15 May 2010 between Bohemians and St. Patrick's Athletic, the first final between teams from the same city. Bohemians won the match 1–0.

=== 2011 ===
The 2011 competition kicked off on 14 February 2011 and concluded on 14 May 2011. It was played over four rounds, each round over two legs, except the final. The competition was again expanded - this time to twelve teams. Six League of Ireland and six IFA Premiership teams took part. Clubs who finished in the top four positions of both leagues qualified, along with the winners of the FAI Cup, League of Ireland Cup, Irish Cup and Irish League Cup competitions. The competition commenced on 14 February 2011, and ended with the final on 14 May 2011, which was played at the Tallaght Stadium, Dublin and was won by Shamrock Rovers. Milo Corcoran, Chairman of the Setanta Sports Cup Organising Committee said he believed the knock-out format would "add even greater excitement to the tournament".

=== 2012 ===
The 2012 competition kicked off on 11 February 2012 and concluded with the final on 12 May 2012. Twelve clubs took part - six from each league. The two league winners, the FAI Cup winners, and the Irish Cup winners received a bye into the quarter-finals. The final was played at the Oval, Belfast and was won by Crusaders for the first time, defeating Derry City 5–4 on penalties after a 2–2 draw.

=== 2013 ===
The 2013 competition kicked off on 11 February 2013 and concluded with the final on 11 May 2013. The competition again featured 12 clubs - six from each league. Cup holders Crusaders, 2012 FAI Cup winners Derry City, 2011–12 IFA Premiership champions Linfield and 2012 League of Ireland champions Sligo Rovers entered the competition in the quarter-finals, with the remaining eight clubs entering in the first round. The final was played at the Tallaght Stadium, Dublin and was won by Shamrock Rovers for the second time.

=== 2014 ===
The 2014 competition kicked off on 24 February 2014, and concluded with the final on 10 May 2014. The competition was reduced in size back down to eight teams, and was originally going to feature Linfield, who were inaugural winners of the competition in 2005 and had appeared in all eight competitions to date, and 2012–13 IFA Premiership champions Cliftonville. However, in December 2013 both clubs declined the invitation to take part, citing match scheduling and reduced prize money as their reasons for deciding not to enter. As a result, the fifth and sixth placed sides from the 2012–13 IFA Premiership, Ballinamallard United and Coleraine were invited to take their place, with both clubs accepting the invitation. A prize fund of €73,000 was distributed in the competition. Sligo Rovers defeated Dundalk 1–0 in the final in Tallaght.

=== Future ===
The competition was scheduled to go ahead in 2015 with four clubs taking part from each league. However, in May 2015, Northern Ireland Football League clubs initially voiced concerns over fixture scheduling – particularly plans for midweek games – raising doubts as to the competition's viability. When suitable fixture dates could not be agreed upon by the clubs, the 2015 competition was postponed until 2016. However, the issues were not resolved, and the tournament was not held in 2016 either. Principal sponsor, Setanta Sports, became Eir Sport after being acquired by Eir, and the competition was ultimately scrapped.

In May 2019, it was announced that a new competition, the Champions Cup, would take place between the winners from the Northern Ireland Football League and the League of Ireland. The contest was played once as a two-legged affair in November 2019, with each team playing an away tie and a home tie.

== Finals ==
Key:

(a.e.t.)	Scores level after 90 minutes. Winner was decided in extra time with no penalty shootout required.
pens.	Scores level after extra time. A penalty shootout was required to determine the winner.

Season	Date	Winner	Score	Runner-up	Venue	Attendance
2005	21 May 2005	Linfield (Northern Ireland)	2 – 0	(Republic of Ireland) Shelbourne	Tolka Park, Dublin	7,800
2006	22 April 2006	Drogheda United (Republic of Ireland)	1 – 0 (a.e.t.)	(Republic of Ireland) Cork City	Tolka Park, Dublin	9,600
2007	12 May 2007	Drogheda United (Republic of Ireland)	1 – 1 (a.e.t.) (4 – 3 pens.)	(Northern Ireland) Linfield	Windsor Park, Belfast	7,600
2008	1 November 2008	Cork City (Republic of Ireland)	2 – 1	(Northern Ireland) Glentoran	Turners Cross, Cork	5,500
2009–10	15 May 2010	Bohemians (Republic of Ireland)	1 – 0	(Republic of Ireland) St Patrick's Athletic	Tallaght Stadium, Dublin	3,896
2011	14 May 2011	Shamrock Rovers (Republic of Ireland)	2 – 0	(Republic of Ireland) Dundalk	Tallaght Stadium, Dublin	4,879
2012	12 May 2012	Crusaders (Northern Ireland)	2 – 2 (a.e.t.) (5 – 4 pens.)	(Republic of Ireland) Derry City (Note: Derry City are located in Northern Ireland. However, they play in the League of Ireland, thus they qualify through, and represent the Republic of Ireland in this competition.)	The Oval, Belfast	3,275
2013	11 May 2013	Shamrock Rovers (Republic of Ireland)	7 – 1	(Republic of Ireland) Drogheda United	Tallaght Stadium, Dublin	4,022
2014	10 May 2014	Sligo Rovers (Republic of Ireland)	1 – 0	(Republic of Ireland) Dundalk	Tallaght Stadium, Dublin	2,600

== Statistics ==
=== Performance by club ===
Club	Winners	Runners-up	Winning years
(Republic of Ireland) Drogheda United	2	1	2006, 2007
(Republic of Ireland) Shamrock Rovers	2	-	2011, 2013
(Northern Ireland) Linfield	1	1	2005
(Republic of Ireland) Cork City	1	1	2008
(Republic of Ireland) Bohemians	1	-	2009–10
(Northern Ireland) Crusaders	1	-	2012
(Republic of Ireland) Sligo Rovers	1	-	2014
(Republic of Ireland) Dundalk	-	2	
(Republic of Ireland) Shelbourne	-	1	
(Northern Ireland) Glentoran	-	1	
(Republic of Ireland) St Patrick's Athletic	-	1	
(Republic of Ireland) Derry City	-	1	

=== Titles by city/town ===
City	Wins	Runners-up	Winning clubs	Runners-up clubs
Dublin	3	2	Shamrock Rovers (2), Bohemians (1)	Shelbourne (1), St. Patrick's Athletic (1)
Belfast	2	2	Linfield (1), Crusaders (1)	Glentoran (1), Linfield (1)
Drogheda	2	1	Drogheda United (2)	Drogheda United (1)
Cork	1	1	Cork City (1)	Cork City (1)
Sligo	1	-	Sligo Rovers (1)	
Dundalk	-	2		Dundalk (2)
Derry	-	1		Derry City (1)

=== Titles by association ===
Province	Wins	Runners up	Winners	Runners up
(Northern Ireland) Irish Football Association	2	2	Linfield (1), Crusaders (1)	Glentoran (1), Linfield (1)
(Republic of Ireland) Football Association of Ireland	7	7	Drogheda United (2), Shamrock Rovers (2), Bohemians (1), Cork City (1), Sligo Rovers (1)	Dundalk (2), Shelbourne (1), St. Patrick's Athletic (1), Drogheda United (1), Derry City (1),Cork City (1)

=== Competing clubs ===
Years in Bold denote competition winner

Club	Appearances	Years Competed
(Northern Ireland) Glentoran	9	2005, 2006, 2007, 2008, 2009–10, 2011, 2012, 2013, 2014
(Northern Ireland) Linfield	8	**2005**, 2006, 2007, 2008, 2009–10, 2011, 2012, 2013
(Republic of Ireland) St Patrick's Athletic	7	2007, 2008, 2009–10, 2011, 2012, 2013, 2014
(Republic of Ireland) Cork City	6	2005, 2006, 2007, **2008**, 2009–10, 2013
(Northern Ireland) Portadown	6	2005, 2006, 2007, 2011, 2012, 2013
(Republic of Ireland) Derry City	6	2006, 2007, 2008, 2009–10, 2012, 2013
(Northern Ireland) Cliftonville	5	2008, 2009–10, 2011, 2012, 2013
(Republic of Ireland) Sligo Rovers	5	2009–10, 2011, 2012, 2013, **2014**
(Republic of Ireland) Drogheda United	4	**2006**, **2007**, 2008, 2013
(Northern Ireland) Crusaders	4	2011, **2012**, 2013, 2014
(Republic of Ireland) Shamrock Rovers	4	**2011**, 2012, **2013**, 2014
(Northern Ireland) Dungannon Swifts	3	2006, 2007, 2008
(Republic of Ireland) Bohemians	3	**2009–10**, 2011, 2012
(Northern Ireland) Coleraine	3	2009–10, 2013, 2014
(Republic of Ireland) Shelbourne	2	2005, 2006
(Republic of Ireland) Dundalk	2	2011, 2014
(Northern Ireland) Lisburn Distillery	2	2011, 2012
(Republic of Ireland) Longford Town	1	2005
(Republic of Ireland) UCD	1	2011
(Republic of Ireland) Bray Wanderers	1	2012
(Northern Ireland) Ballinamallard United	1	2014

== See also ==
- Champions Cup (All-Ireland) sponsored by Unite the Union
- Dublin and Belfast Intercity Cup
- North-South Cup
- Blaxnit Cup
- Texaco (All-Ireland) Cup
- Tyler Cup
- Irish News Cup
- Irish Cup
- Northern Ireland Football League Cup
- NIFL Premiership
- FAI Cup
- League of Ireland Cup
- League of Ireland
