= 2024 Colorado Springs Switchbacks FC season =

Colorado Springs Switchbacks FC
2024 season
- President: Martin Ragain
- Head coach: James Chambers
- Stadium: Weidner Field
- USL Championship: Western Conference: 2nd League: 6th
- USL Playoffs: Champions
- 2024 U.S. Open Cup: Round of 32
- Top goalscorer: Ronaldo Damus (12 goals
- Highest home attendance: 8,023

The 2024 Colorado Springs Switchbacks FC season was the club's tenth season of existence, and their tenth season in the Western Conference of the USL Championship, the second tier of the United States soccer league system.

After a successful regular season that saw the club achieve the second seed in the Western Conference, they went on to cruise through the playoffs, only allowing a single goal the entire playoffs on their way to their first USL Championship title in club history.

== Players ==
As of June 24, 2024

Note: Flags indicate national team as defined under FIFA eligibility rules; some limited exceptions apply. Players may hold more than one non-FIFA nationality.

No.	Pos.	Nation	Player
1	GK	MEX	Christian Herrera
2	DF	USA	Koa Santos
3	DF	GHA	Wahab Ackwei
4	DF	HAI	Delentz Pierre
5	DF	USA	Matt Mahoney (soccer)
6	DF	USA	Matt Real
7	MF	JAM	Tyreek Magee
8	FW	NOR	Jonas Fjeldberg
9	FW	HAI	Ronaldo Damus
10	MF	USA	Zach Zandi
11	FW	FRA	Quenzi Huerman
13	MF	USA	Steven Echevarria
14	DF	HAI	Duke Lacroix

No.	Pos.	Nation	Player
17	MF	SLV	Jairo Henriquez
18	MF	USA	Aidan Rocha
19	MF	USA	Marco Rios
20	FW	JPN	Yosuke Hanya
21	FW	SWE	Alex Andersson
23	GK	USA	Joe Rice
27	FW	PAN	Juan Tejada
46	DF	USA	Dillon Clarke
74	MF	USA	Francisco Aceves
77	FW	USA	Caden Hickox
80	MF	JAM	Devon Williams
99	FW	JAM	Maalique Foster
-	DF	GUA	Carlos Estrada

== Competitions ==
=== USL Championship ===
==== Standings ====
Pos	Team	Pld	W	L	T	GF	GA	GD	Pts	Qualification
1	New Mexico United	34	18	11	5	46	44	+2	59	Playoffs
2	Colorado Springs Switchbacks FC (C)	34	15	12	7	48	40	+8	52	Playoffs
3	Memphis 901 FC	34	14	11	9	52	41	+11	51	Playoffs
4	Las Vegas Lights FC	34	13	10	11	49	46	+3	50	Playoffs
5	Sacramento Republic FC	34	13	11	10	46	34	+12	49	Playoffs

Source: USL Championship Standings
Rules for classification: 1) head-to-head points; 2) head-to-head goal differential; 3) points-per game within conference; 4) total wins; 5) total goal differential; 6) total goals scored; 7) points earned against top four Conference finishers; 8) disciplinary points; 9) coin toss or drawing of lots
(C) Champions

==== Match results ====
On December 18, 2023, the USL Championship released the regular season schedule for all 24 teams.

All times are in Mountain Standard Time.

===== March =====
March 9 1	Miami FC	2–0	Colorado Springs Switchbacks FC	Miami, Florida
5:00 P.M.	Booth 16'; Genzano (yellow card) 77'; Botta 85' (pen.), (yellow card) 90+7'	Report	Lacroix (yellow card) 12'; Henríquez (yellow card) 66'	Stadium: FIU Stadium; Attendance: 1,122; Referee: Sergii Demianchuk

March 16 2	Colorado Springs Switchbacks FC	1–2	Detroit City FC	Colorado Springs, Colorado
6:00 P.M.	Santos (yellow card) 22' (yellow-red card) 60'; Echevarria (yellow card) 33'; Mahoney 47'; Huerman (yellow card) 87'	Report	Amoh 11'; Levis (yellow card) 45+2'; Steinwascher (yellow card) 84'; Rutz 89'	Stadium: Weidner Field; Attendance: 6,174; Referee: Elijio Arreguin

March 23 3	San Antonio FC	2–0	Colorado Springs Switchbacks FC	San Antonio, Texas
6:30 P.M.	Taintor (yellow card) 4'; Omar (yellow card) 26'; Hernández (yellow card) 64'; Silva 75', (yellow card) 83'; Mbongue 90+1'	Report	Tejada (yellow card) 62'; Williams (yellow card) 88'; Foster (yellow card) 90+2'	Stadium: Toyota Field; Attendance: 6,138; Referee: Abdou Ndiaye

===== April =====
April 6 4	Colorado Springs Switchbacks FC	0–2	Sacramento Republic FC	Colorado Springs, Colorado
6:00 PM	Tejada (yellow card) 43'; Herrera (yellow card) 43'; Ackwei (yellow card) 63'	Report	Amann 5'; Cicerone 26' (yellow card) 43'; Ross (yellow card) 54'	Stadium: Weidner Field; Attendance: 6,965; Referee: Brad Jensen

April 13 5	Phoenix Rising FC	1–0	Colorado Springs Switchbacks	Phoenix, Arizona
7:30 P.M.	Doratiotto (yellow card) 5'; Traore (yellow card) 21'; Torres (yellow card) 55'; Stenberg 71'; Hernández (yellow card) 90+2'	PHX Report; COS Report	Andersson (yellow card) 88'	Stadium: Phoenix Rising Soccer Stadium; Attendance: 6,277; Referee: Nabil Bensalah

April 20 6	Colorado Springs Switchbacks	1–1	Indy Eleven	Colorado Springs, CO
6:00 P.M.	Damus 3'; Rocha (yellow card) 15'; Tejada (yellow card) 20'; Rocha (yellow card) 15'; Hanya (yellow card) 45'; Ackwei (red card) 58'; Foster (yellow card) 70'	Report	Chapman-Page (yellow card) 14'; Lindley (yellow card) 14'; Martínez (yellow card) 18'; Williams 31'; Ofeimu (yellow card) 87'	Stadium: Weidner Field; Attendance: 6,687; Referee: Trevor Wiseman

April 27 7	Oakland Roots SC	0–2	Colorado Springs Switchbacks FC	Hayward, California
8:00 PM	Rasmussen (yellow card) 52'; Riley (yellow card) 83'	Report	Zandi (yellow card) 22'; Tejada 71'; Lacroix (yellow card) 73'; Rocha 84'; Henríquez (yellow card) 90+1'	Stadium: Pioneer Stadium; Attendance: 3,430; Referee: Alexis Da Silva

===== May =====
May 4 8	Colorado Springs Switchbacks FC	2–0	El Paso Locomotive FC	Colorado Springs, Colorado
7:00 P.M.	Damus (yellow card) 13' (goal) 22' 89' (pen.); Henríquez (yellow card) 79'; Herrera (yellow card) 86'; Mahoney (yellow card) 90+1'	Report	Lyons (yellow card) 53'; Dhillon (yellow card) 70'; Waite (yellow card) 76'; Calvillo (yellow card) 88'	Stadium: Weidner Field; Attendance: 8,023; Referee: Luis Arroyo

May 11 9	Hartford Athletic	0–2	Colorado Springs Switchbacks FC	Hartford, Connecticut
5:00 PM	Farrell (yellow card) 29'; Scarlett (yellow card) 45+3'; Dieng (yellow card) 77'; Chapman (yellow card) 79'	Report	Santos (yellow card) 14'; Hanya 24'; Foster (yellow card) 59'; Damus 81' (pen.); Echevarria (yellow card) 86'	Stadium: Trinity Health Stadium; Attendance: 5,500; Referee: Lorenzo Hernandez

May 17 10	Colorado Springs Switchbacks	3–1	Rhode Island FC	Colorado Springs, CO
9:00PM	Damus 27', 87' (pen.); Yao 65' (o.g.)	Report	Nodarse 13'; Turnbull (yellow card) 34'; Ybarra (yellow card) 45'; Kwizera (yellow card) 60'; Saydee (yellow card) 85'	Stadium: Weidner Field; Attendance: 8,023; Referee: Greg Dopka

===== June =====
June 1 11	Colorado Springs Switchbacks FC	1–0	Oakland Roots SC	Colorado Springs, Colorado
7:00 P.M.	Pierre 2'; Damus (yellow card) 27'	Report	Margvelashvili (yellow card) 42'; Diaz (yellow card) 57'	Stadium: Weidner Field; Attendance: 7,366; Referee: Joe Surgan

June 8 12	Memphis 901 FC	1–1	Colorado Springs Switchbacks FC	Memphis, Tennessee
6:30 P.M.	Fernando 38'; Turci (yellow card) 45+2'; Ward (yellow card) 53'; Duncan (yellow card) 67'	Report	Ackwei 5'; Tejada (yellow card) 34'; Mahoney (yellow card) 66'; Pierre (yellow card) 73'; Santos (yellow card) 90+4'	Stadium: AutoZone Park; Attendance: 3,090; Referee: Eric Tattersall

June 15 13	Colorado Springs Switchbacks FC	4–2	Orange County SC	Colorado Springs, Colorado
7:00 PM	Hanya 19', 82'; Williams (yellow card) 52'; Foster 63', 86'; Damus (yellow card) 89'	Report	Flood (yellow card) 42'; Jamison 48', 61'; Doghman (yellow card) 80'; Shutler (yellow card) 82'	Stadium: Weidner Field; Attendance: 8,023; Referee: Brad Jensen

June 18 14	Las Vegas Lights FC	3–3	Colorado Springs Switchbacks FC	Las Vegas, Nevada
6:30 PM	Hafferty 28'; Bennett 45+4' (pen.); Noël 80'; Howell (yellow card) 82'	Report	Huerman 6' (yellow card) 22'; Santos (yellow card) 8'; Henríquez 31'; Lacroix (yellow card) 53'; Damus 89'	Stadium: Cashman Field; Attendance: 1,339; Referee: Elijio Arreguin

June 22 15	New Mexico United	1–0	Colorado Springs Switchbacks FC	Albuquerque, New Mexico
7:00 PM	Herbert (yellow card) 56'; Bruce (yellow card) 80'; Maples 90+2'; Flanagan (yellow card) 90+3'	Report	Mahoney (yellow card) 45'; Herrera (yellow card) 90+2'	Stadium: Isotopes Park; Attendance: 10,176; Referee: Corbyn May

June 29 16	Colorado Springs Switchbacks	1–0	Monterey Bay FC	Colorado Springs, Colorado
7:00 PM	Damus 39' (pen.); Real (yellow card) 52'	Report	Ngnepi (yellow card) 37'; Lara (yellow card) 42'; Rebollar (yellow card) 55'; Greene (yellow card) 58'	Stadium: Weidner Field; Attendance: 8,023; Referee: Lorenzo Hernandez

===== July =====
July 4 17	Colorado Springs Switchbacks	1–0	FC Tulsa	Colorado Springs, Colorado
7:00 PM	Zandi 90+3'; Hanya (yellow card) 90+10'	Report	Stojanovic (yellow card) 16'; Goodrum (yellow card) 27'; St Clair (yellow card) 90+2'; Laswo (yellow card) 90+8'	Stadium: Weidner Field; Attendance: 8,023; Referee: Gerald Flores

July 13 18	Birmingham Legion FC	2–1	Colorado Springs Switchbacks FC	Birmingham, Alabama
6:30 PM	McCartney 45+1'; Paterson (yellow card) 69'; Pinho 85'	Report	Zandi 11'	Stadium: Protective Stadium; Referee: Adam Kilpatrick

July 19 19	Louisville City FC	2–1	Colorado Springs Switchbacks FC	Louisville, Kentucky
7:00 PM	Wynder (yellow card) 18' (goal) 27'; Totsch (yellow card) 39' (goal) 90+5'	Report	Foster 16'; Santos (yellow card) 55'; Huerman (yellow card) 66'	Stadium: Lynn Family Stadium; Attendance: 10,418; Referee: Muhammad Hassan

July 26 20	Colorado Springs Switchbacks	1–1	Las Vegas Lights FC	Colorado Springs, Colorado
7:00 PM	Fjeldberg 30' (yellow card) 45+1'; Real (yellow card) 53'; Hanya (yellow card) 58'	Report	Smart 26' (yellow card) 73'; Doody (yellow card) 61'; Jabang (yellow card) 86'	Stadium: Weidner Field; Attendance: 8,023; Referee: Ricardo Fierro

===== August =====
August 3 21	Colorado Springs Switchbacks	2–0	Phoenix Rising FC	Colorado Springs, Colorado
1:00 PM	Damus 34'; Foster (yellow card) 50'; Rocha (yellow card) 90+4'; Chambers (yellow card) 90+6' (red card) 90+6'; Magee 90+9' (yellow card) 90+9'	Report	Zambrano (yellow card) 12'; Torres (yellow card) 65'; Doratiotto (yellow card) 90+4'	Stadium: Weidner Field; Attendance: 8,023; Referee: Elijio Arreguin

August 10 22	North Carolina FC	4–1	Colorado Springs Switchbacks FC	Cary, North Carolina
5:30 PM	Batista (yellow card) 25'; Anderson 40', 78' (yellow card) 79'; Conway 46' (yellow card) 65'; Servania (yellow card) 87'; Armstrong (yellow card) 89' da Costa 90+5'	Report	Foster 57'	Stadium: WakeMed Soccer Park; Attendance: 2,387; Referee: Thomas Snyder

August 17 23	Pittsburgh Riverhounds SC	2–2	Colorado Springs Switchbacks FC	Pittsburgh, PA
5:00PM	Johnson (yellow card) 40'; Walti 54'; Suber 90'+1'	Report	Magee 13'; Tejada (yellow card) 69'; Fjellberg (yellow card) 79'; Santos (yellow card) 87'; Herrera (yellow card) 90'+2'; Pierre 90'+6'	Stadium: Highmark Stadium; Attendance: 4,332; Referee: Lorenzo Hernandez

August 24 24	Colorado Springs Switchbacks FC	0–1	New Mexico United	Colorado Springs, Colorado
7:00 PM	Henríquez (yellow card) 69'; Mahoney (yellow card) 77'; Hanya (yellow card) 90+2'	Report	Akale 8'; Micaletto (yellow card) 10'; Bailey (yellow card) 52' (yellow-red card) 71'; Hurst (yellow card) 90+8'	Stadium: Weidner Field; Attendance: 8,023; Referee: Joshua Encarnación

August 28 25	Colorado Springs Switchbacks FC	3–1	Memphis 901 FC	Colorado Springs, Colorado
7:00 PM	Fjellberg 4', 6'; Hanya (yellow card) 30'; Real (yellow card) 71'; Damus 75' (pen.)	Report	Lapa (yellow card) 13'; Mahoney 31' (o.g.); Careaga (yellow card) 37' (yellow-red card) 40'; Ward (yellow card) 40'; Marlon (red card) 77'; Paul (yellow card) 86'	Stadium: Weidner Field; Attendance: 7,481; Referee: Trevor Wiseman

===== September =====
September 1 26	FC Tulsa	1–4	Colorado Springs Switchbacks FC	Tulsa, Oklahoma
4:00 PM	Booth (yellow card) 62' (goal) 90'+3'	Report	Henríquez 2'; Real (yellow card) 21' (goal) 69'; Damus 37'; Lacroix 45'+1'; Pierre (yellow card) 51'; Fjellberg (yellow card) 83'	Stadium: ONEOK Field; Attendance: 3,666; Referee: Elton García

September 7 27	Colorado Springs Switchbacks FC	4–2	Tampa Bay Rowdies	Colorado Springs, Colorado
7:00 PM	Pierre (yellow card) 20'; Bodily 28' (o.g.); Magee 42'; Dhillon 47'; Hanya 53'	Report	Spaulding (yellow card) 10'; Fernandes 74'; Bodily (yellow card) 76'; Rivera 79'; Guillen (yellow card) 86'	Stadium: Weidner Field; Attendance: 7,362; Referee: Jeremy Scheer

September 14 28	Colorado Springs Switchbacks FC	2-0	Charleston Battery	Colorado Springs, Colorado
6:00 PM	Dhillon 14' (yellow card) 35'; Herrera (yellow card) 64'; Magee (yellow card) 66'; Damus 73' (pen.); Hanya (yellow card) 74'	Report	Allan (yellow card) 69'	Stadium: Weidner Field; Attendance: 8,023; Referee: Ricardo Fierro

September 21 29	El Paso Locomotive FC	1-1	Colorado Springs Switchbacks FC	El Paso, Texas
6:00 PM	Ortiz (yellow card) 36'; Akinyode (yellow card) 41'; Stauffer (yellow card) 46'; Ruiz 51'	Report	Magee (yellow card) 21'; Hanya 24' (yellow card) 48'; Damus (yellow card) 56'; Herrera (yellow card) 68'; Mahoney (yellow card) 68'	Stadium: Southwest University Park; Attendance: 5,422; Referee: Nabil Bensalah

September 28 30	Colorado Springs Switchbacks FC	1-1	Loudoun United FC	Colorado Springs, Colorado
6:00 PM	Zandi 2' (yellow card) 45'+3'	Report	Leerman (yellow card) 45'+1'; Awuah (yellow card) 52'; McCabe (yellow card) 58'; Johnston (yellow card) 86'; ElMedkhar 90'+7' (yellow card) 90'+8'	Stadium: Weidner Field; Attendance: 8,023; Referee: Servando Berna Rico

===== October =====
October 9 31	Orange County SC	2-0	Colorado Springs Switchbacks FC	Irvine, California
8:00 PM	Partida (yellow card) 27'; Williams 32' (o.g.); Zubak 90'+5'	Report	Dhillon (yellow card) 19' (yellow-red card) 44'; Rocha (yellow card) 30'; Tejada (yellow card) 47'; Pierre (yellow card) 78'; Santos (yellow card) 84'	Stadium: Championship Soccer Stadium; Attendance: 4,130; Referee: Muhammad Hassan

October 12 32	Colorado Springs Switchbacks FC	1-2	San Antonio FC	Colorado Springs, Colorado
6:00 PM	Hanya (yellow card) 22'; Huerman (yellow card) 25'; Rocha 68'; Mahoney (yellow card) 78'	Report	Manley (yellow card) 44'; Mbongue 77'; Sisniega (yellow card) 90'+7'; Buckmaster (yellow card) 90'+7'; Solignac 90'+9'	Stadium: Weidner Field; Attendance: 8,023; Referee: Calin Radosav

October 19 33	Monterey Bay FC	0-1	Colorado Springs Switchbacks	Seaside, California
8:00 PM	Lara (yellow card) 15'; Martinez (yellow card) 62'; Gnaulati (yellow card) 90'+7'	Report	Zandi 50' (yellow card) 74'; Magee (yellow card) 69'; Real (yellow card) 90'+8'	Stadium: Cardinale Stadium; Attendance: 4,150; Referee: Alex Beehler

October 26 34	Sacramento Republic FC	0-1	Colorado Springs Switchbacks FC	Sacramento, California
8:00 PM	Viader (yellow card) 57'; Cicerone (yellow card) 68'	Report	Williams (yellow card) 23'; Hanya (yellow card) 36'; Magee (yellow card) 44'; Zandi (yellow card) 51'; Tejada 85'	Stadium: Heart Health Park; Attendance: 11,569; Referee: Ricardo Montero

===== Playoffs =====
November 2, 2024 Conference Quarterfinals	Colorado Springs Switchbacks	2–0	Oakland Roots SC	Colorado Springs, Colorado
6:00 PM	Henriquez 41'; Magee (yellow card) 49'; Damus 56' (pen.); Hanya (yellow card) 70'; Huerman (yellow card) 79'; Rocha (yellow card) 80'	Report	Margvelashvili (yellow card) 55'; Riley (yellow card) 64'; Diaz (yellow card) 90+5'; Njie (yellow card) 90+6'	Stadium: Weidner Field; Attendance: 7,463; Referee: Abdou Ndiaye

November 10, 2024 Conference Semifinals	Colorado Springs Switchbacks	2–1 (a.e.t.)	Orange County SC	Colorado Springs, Colorado
4:30 PM	Zandi 10', 105+1' (yellow card) 69'	Report	Zubak 4'; Casiple (yellow card) 85'; Powers (yellow card) 108'	Stadium: Weidner Field; Attendance: 7,236; Referee: Lorenzo Hernandez

November 16, 2024 Conference Finals	Colorado Springs Switchbacks	1–0	Las Vegas Lights FC	Colorado Springs, Colorado
7:00 PM	Tejada 38'; Henríquez (yellow card) 84'	Report	Howell (yellow card) 45'; Nigro (yellow card) 54'	Stadium: Weidner Field; Attendance: 8,023; Referee: Elton Garcia

November 23, 2024 Final	Colorado Springs Switchbacks	3–0	Rhode Island FC	Colorado Springs, Colorado
10:00 AM				Stadium: Weidner Field; Attendance: 8,023

=== U.S. Open Cup ===
As a member of the USL Championship, the Switchbacks entered the U.S. Open Cup in the Round of 32. It was announced by the U.S. Soccer Federation on April 18, 2024, that the Switchbacks would face off against MLS Next Pro team New York City FC II, a team in the third tier of the U.S. soccer pyramid and the last MLS reserve team left in the Open Cup, away in New York City.

May 8 Round of 32	New York City FC II (New York (state))	1–0	(Colorado) Colorado Springs Switchbacks FC	New York City, New York
7:30 EDT	Jimenez 6'; Elias (yellow card) 15'; Calheira (yellow card) 90+5'	Report	Pierre (yellow card) 39'; Henríquez (yellow card) 60'; Rocha (yellow card) 88' (yellow-red card) 88'; Ackwei (yellow card) 90+4'	Stadium: Belson Stadium; Attendance: 360; Referee: Jeremy Scheer
