= 2025 Colorado Springs Switchbacks FC season =

Colorado Springs Switchbacks FC
2025 season
- President: Martin Ragain
- Head coach: James Chambers
- Stadium: Weidner Field
- USL Championship: Western Conference: 8th Overall: 16th
- USL Championship Playoffs: Conference Quarter-Finals
- 2025 U.S. Open Cup: Round of 32
- 2025 USL Cup: Group Stage
Home colors	Away colors

The 2025 Colorado Springs Switchbacks FC season was the club's eleventh season of existence, and their eleventh season in the Western Conference of the USL Championship, the second tier of the United States soccer league system.

The club came into the 2025 season the reigning USL Championship title-holders, after cruising through the 2024 USL Championship playoffs, only allowing a single goal on their way to their first title in club history.

== Players ==
As of March 10, 2025

Note: Flags indicate national team as defined under FIFA eligibility rules; some limited exceptions apply. Players may hold more than one non-FIFA nationality.

No.	Pos.	Nation	Player
1	GK	MEX	Christian Herrera
2	DF	USA	Koa Santos
3	DF	USA	Akeem Ward
5	DF	USA	Matt Mahoney
6	DF	USA	Matt Real
7	FW	NOR	Jonas Fjeldberg
9	FW	CAN	Levonte Johnson
10	MF	USA	Zach Zandi
11	FW	FRA	Quenzi Huerman
13	MF	PUR	Stevie Echevarria
14	DF	HAI	Duke Lacroix

No.	Pos.	Nation	Player
18	MF	USA	Aidan Rocha
19	MF	USA	Marco Rios
20	FW	JPN	Yosuke Hanya (on loan from Colorado Rapids 2)
21	MF	USA	Anthony Fontana
22	MF	ITA	Marco Micaletto
23	DF	HAI	Garven Métusala
24	GK	MEX	Abraham Romero (on loan from Columbus Crew)
27	FW	PAN	Juan Tejada
33	DF	USA	Isaiah Foster
77	FW	USA	Justin Dhillon

1. USL Academy Contract

== Competitions ==
=== USL Championship ===
==== Standings ====
Pos	Team	Pld	W	L	T	GF	GA	GD	Pts	Qualification
6	San Antonio FC	30	11	12	7	39	38	+1	40 (Note: Phoenix Rising FC are ahead of San Antonio FC on head-to-head points: PHX 6, SAN 0.)	Playoffs
7	Orange County SC	30	10	11	9	44	45	−1	39	Playoffs
8	Colorado Springs Switchbacks FC	30	10	13	7	35	47	−12	37	Playoffs
9	Lexington SC	30	9	12	9	31	42	−11	36	
10	Oakland Roots SC	30	8	14	8	42	52	−10	32	

Source: USL Championship Standings
Rules for classification: 1) head-to-head points; 2) head-to-head goal differential; 3) points-per-game within conference; 4) total wins; 5) total goal differential; 6) total goals scored; 7) points earned against top four Conference finishers; 8) disciplinary points; 9) coin toss or drawing of lots

==== Match results ====
On December 19, 2024, the USL Championship released the regular season schedule for all 24 teams.

All times are in Mountain Standard Time.

===== March =====
March 8 1	El Paso Locomotive FC	2–2	Detroit City FC	El Paso, Texas
7:00 PM	Quezada (yellow card) 14'; Moreno 43' (yellow card) 84'; Ruiz (yellow card) 49'; Cabrera 90'+2'	Report	Micaletto 2' (pen.); Hanya (yellow card) 29'; Ward (yellow card) 31'; Mahoney (yellow card) 36'; Real (yellow card) 39'; Fjeldberg 74'	Stadium: Southwest University Park; Attendance: 5,787; Referee: Elijio Arreguin

March 15 2	Colorado Springs Switchbacks FC	1–2	Detroit City FC	Colorado Springs, Colorado
3:00 PM	Tejada 47'; Fontana (yellow card) 73'	Report	Polisi (yellow card) 10'; Wiedt (yellow card) 38'; Smith 62'; Lacroix 81' (o.g.)	Stadium: Weidner Field; Attendance: 8,023; Referee: Greg Dopka

March 22 3	Sacramento Republic FC	2–2	Colorado Springs Switchbacks FC	Sacramento, California
8:00 PM	Gurr 24'; Cicerone 74'	Report	Dhillon 86' (pen.) 90'+7' (pen.)	Stadium: Heart Health Park; Attendance: 9,251; Referee: Calin Radosav

March 29 4	Indy Eleven	2–3	Colorado Springs Switchbacks FC	Indianapolis, Indiana
5:00 PM	Foster 19'; Murphy (yellow card) 53'; Quinn 90+8'	Report	Adams (yellow card) 7'; Micaletto 43', 62'; Ward (yellow card) 59'; Dhillon 64'; Romero (yellow card) 90+5'	Stadium: IU Michael A. Carroll Soccer Stadium; Attendance: 10,202; Referee: Joshua Encarnación

===== April =====
April 5 5	Colorado Springs Switchbacks FC	v	New Mexico United	Colorado Springs, Colorado
3:00 PM		Report		Stadium: Weidner Field
Note: Postponed to September 24 due to inclement weather

April 12 6	Monterey Bay FC	2−1	Colorado Springs Switchbacks FC	Seaside, California
8:00 PM	Rebollar 36'; Malango 83'	Report	Justin Dhillon - 42	Stadium: Cardinale Stadium; Attendance: 3,309; Referee: Elvis Osmanovic

April 19 7	Colorado Springs Switchbacks FC	1–1	El Paso Locomotive FC	Colorado Springs, Colorado
5:00 PM	Endeley 12'; Zandi (yellow card) 16' (yellow-red card) 46'	Report	Coronado 13'	Stadium: Weidner Field; Attendance: 7,193; Referee: Servando Berna Rico

April 23 8	San Antonio FC	3–2	Colorado Springs Switchbacks FC	San Antonio, Texas
6:30 PM	Berron (yellow card) 48'; J. Hernandez 51'; Omar 58'; Greive 64'; Medranda (yellow card) 71'; Pacheco (yellow card) 87'	Report	Micaletto (yellow card) 3'; Real 21' (red card) 56'; Dhillon 42'; Rocha (yellow card) 88'; Tejada (yellow card) 90+2'	Stadium: Toyota Field; Attendance: 3,735; Referee: Natalie Simon

===== May =====
May 3 9	Colorado Springs Switchbacks FC	1–1	Phoenix Rising FC	Colorado Springs, Colorado
6:00 PM	Fontana 58'; Romero (red card) 90'+4'	Report	Margaritha 11'	Stadium: Weidner Field; Attendance: 8,023; Referee: Matthew Corrigan

May 10 10	Las Vegas Lights FC	0–0	Colorado Springs Switchbacks FC	Las Vegas, Nevada
8:30 PM		Report		Stadium: Cashman Field; Attendance: 3,148; Referee: Brandon Stevis

May 17 11	Colorado Springs Switchbacks FC	1–0	Pittsburgh Riverhounds SC	Colorado Springs, Colorado
7:00 PM	Mahoney 12'	Report		Stadium: Weidner Field; Attendance: 8,023; Referee: Elton García

May 24 12	Orange County SC	3–1	Colorado Springs Switchbacks FC	Irvine, California
8:00 PM	Hegardt 28'; Dunbar 61'; War 90'+3'	Report	Anthony Fontana 66' (yellow card) 56' (yellow-red card) 78'	Stadium: Championship Soccer Stadium; Attendance: 5,000; Referee: Atahan Yaya

===== June =====
June 7 13	New Mexico United	1–1	Colorado Springs Switchbacks FC	Albuquerque, New Mexico
	Vargas 22'	Report	Ryden 41' (o.g.)	Stadium: Isotopes Park; Attendance: 9,862; Referee: Timothy Ford

June 14 14	Colorado Springs Switchbacks FC	1–0	Oakland Roots SC	Colorado Springs, Colorado
	Micaletto 39'	Report		Stadium: Weidner Field; Attendance: 7,800; Referee: John Matto

June 20 15	Lexington SC	2−1	Colorado Springs Switchbacks FC	Lexington, Kentucky
5:00 PM	Ajago 13'; Clegg 57' (o.g.)	Report	Mahoney 74'	Stadium: Lexington SC Stadium; Attendance: 6,012; Referee: Alex Billeter

===== July =====
July 4 16	Louisville City FC	1–0	Colorado Springs Switchbacks FC	Louisville, Kentucky
6:00 PM		Report	Goodrum 9'	Stadium: Lynn Family Stadium; Attendance: 7,248; Referee: Brandon Stevis

July 19 17	Birmingham Legion FC	0–1	Colorado Springs Switchbacks FC	Birmingham, Alabama
6:00 PM		Report	Micaletto 83'	Stadium: Protective Stadium; Attendance: 5,007; Referee: Elvis Osmanovic

===== August =====
August 1 18	Colorado Springs Switchbacks FC	3–1	Lexington SC	Colorado Springs, Colorado
	Mahoney 40', 79'; Huerman 30'	Report	Midence 77'	Stadium: Weidner Field; Attendance: 7,349; Referee: Mark Verso

August 9 19	Oakland Roots SC	1–2	Colorado Springs Switchbacks FC	Oakland, California
8:00 PM	Wilson 59'	Report	Fjellberg 43'; Huerman 49'	Stadium: Oakland Coliseum; Attendance: 5,063; Referee: Matthew Thompson

August 16 20	Colorado Springs Switchbacks FC	0–1	Orange County SC	Colorado Springs, Colorado
7:30 PM		Report	Benalcazar 62'	Stadium: Weidner Field; Attendance: 7,525; Referee: John Griggs

August 23 21	Phoenix Rising FC	4–1	Colorado Springs Switchbacks	Phoenix, Arizona
8:00 PM	Cabral 6'; Rizzo 11'; Avayevu 26'; Flood 78'	Report	Zandi 16'	Stadium: Phoenix Rising Soccer Stadium; Attendance: 4,118; Referee: Thomas Snyder

August 30 22	Colorado Springs Switchbacks FC	2–0	FC Tulsa	Colorado Springs, Colorado
7:00 PM MDT	Huerman 58'; Mrowka 90'+11'	Report		Stadium: Weidner Field; Attendance: 6,411; Referee: Rodrigo Albuquerque

===== September =====
September 6 23	Colorado Springs Switchbacks FC	2-1	Monterey Bay FC	Colorado Springs, Colorado
	Matt Real (yellow card) 36'; Tyler Clegg 56'; Kyle Vassell 63'	Report	Xavi Gnaulati (yellow card) 20'; Tarik Scott 40'; Grant Robinson (soccer) (yellow card) 45+1'; John Klein (yellow card) 49'; Adrian Rebolarr (yellow card) 67'	Stadium: Weidner Field; Attendance: 7,244; Referee: Elton García

September 13 24	Tampa Bay Rowdies	3–3	Colorado Springs Switchbacks FC	St. Petersburg, Florida
7:30 PM	Marie 8'; Pacius 21'; Castellanos 25'	Report	Tejada 17', 32'; Micaletto 58'	Stadium: Al Lang Stadium; Attendance: 3,734; Referee: Luis Arroyo

September 20 25	Colorado Springs Switchbacks FC	0–2	Sacramento Republic FC	Colorado Springs, Colorado
6:00 PM		Report	Jamieson 68'; Cicerone 84'	Stadium: Weidner Field; Attendance: 6,843; Referee: Jeremy Scheer

September 24 5	Colorado Springs Switchbacks FC	1–2	New Mexico United	Colorado Springs, Colorado
4:00 PM	Hanya 3'		Harris 64'; Moguel 83'	Stadium: Weidner Field; Attendance: 6,059; Referee: Muhammad Kaleia

September 27 26	Colorado Springs Switchbacks FC	0–2	Hartford Athletic	Colorado Springs, Colorado
5:00 PM		Report	Obalola 41'; Panayotou 51'	Stadium: Weidner Field; Attendance: 7,006; Referee: Brad Jensen

===== October =====
October 4 27	Colorado Springs Switchbacks FC	1−0	San Antonio FC	Colorado Springs, Colorado
6:00 PM	Tejada 15'; Lacroix (yellow card) 52' (yellow-red card) 81'	Report		Stadium: Weidner Field; Attendance: 6,452

October 13 28	Charleston Battery	5–0	Colorado Springs Switchbacks FC	Mount Pleasant, South Carolina
3:00 PM	Molloy 7'; Myers 12'; Ycaza 25'; Dossantos 78'; Ortiz 83'	Report		Stadium: Patriots Point Soccer Complex; Attendance: 2,993; Referee: Trevor Wiseman
Note: Match was originally on October 11 due to inclement weather; When abandoned during halftime, Colorado Springs was leading 1–0

October 18 29	Colorado Springs Switchbacks FC	1−0	Las Vegas Lights FC	Colorado Springs, Colorado
7:00 PM	Fjeldberg 54'	Report		Stadium: Weidner Field; Attendance: 7,364; Referee: Edson Carvajal

October 25 30	FC Tulsa	3–0	Colorado Springs Switchbacks FC	Tulsa, Oklahoma
6:00 PM	ElMedkhar 10'; Calheira 57', 79'	Report		Stadium: ONEOK Field; Attendance: 2,756; Referee: Joshua Encarnación

=== USL Championship playoffs ===
The Switchbacks qualified for the 2025 USL Championship playoffs by finishing in the top eight seeds in the Western Conference. Their quarterfinal match was scheduled for November 1st against FC Tulsa, the first seed. Playing away in Tulsa, the Switchbacks ultimately fell in added extra time 1–0.

==== Conference Quarter-finals ====
November 1, 2025 Conference Quarterfinals	FC Tulsa	1–0 (a.e.t.)	Colorado Springs Switchbacks FC	Tulsa, Oklahoma
7:00 PM CT	Lukic 92'	Report		Stadium: ONEOK Field; Attendance: 7,583; Referee: Ryan Carrigan

=== USL Cup ===
The Switchbacks participated in the second edition of the USL Cup, the first edition to feature teams from both the USL Championship and League One.

Pos	Lg	Team	Pld	W	PKW	PKL	L	GF	GA	GD	Pts	Qualification
1	USLC	San Antonio FC	4	3	0	1	0	6	2	+4	10	Advance to knockout stage
2	USLC	New Mexico United	4	1	2	1	0	9	7	+2	8	
3	USLC	Colorado Springs Switchbacks FC	4	2	0	1	1	7	4	+3	7	
4	USLC	Phoenix Rising FC	4	1	2	0	1	10	10	0	7	
5	USLC	El Paso Locomotive FC	4	1	1	1	1	3	3	0	6	
6	USL1	Union Omaha	4	1	0	0	3	3	5	−2	3	
7	USL1	Texoma FC	4	0	0	1	3	5	12	−7	1	

Updated to match(es) played on July 26, 2025. Source: USL

May 31, 2025	El Paso Locomotive FC	0–1	Colorado Springs Switchbacks FC	El Paso, Texas
7:00 PM MDT		Report	Huerman 35'	Stadium: Southwest University Park; Attendance: 5,845; Referee: Muhammad Hassan

June 25, 2025	Colorado Springs Switchbacks FC	0–2	San Antonio FC	Colorado Springs, Colorado
7:00 PM MDT		Report	Parades 63', 89'	Stadium: Weidner Field; Attendance: 5,500; Referee: Trevor Wiseman

June 28, 2025	New Mexico United	2–2 (3–2 p)	Colorado Springs Switchbacks FC	Albuquerque, New Mexico
7:00 PM MDT	Amang 24'; Maples 34' (pen.)	Report	Tejada 28'; Fontana 65'	Stadium: Rio Grande Credit Union Field at Isotopes Park; Attendance: 10,747; Referee: Nabil Bensalah
	Penalties
	Fernando (penalty missed); Jabang (penalty scored); Maples (penalty scored); Gloster (penalty scored)		(penalty missed) Adams; (penalty scored) Huerman; (penalty scored) Lacroix; (penalty missed) Zandi; (penalty missed) Mahoney

July 26, 2025	Colorado Springs Switchbacks FC	4–0	Texoma FC	Colorado Springs, Colorado
7:00 PM MDT	Tejada 37'; Huerman 51', 90+3'; Clegg 79'	Report		Stadium: Weidner Field; Attendance: 7,329; Referee: Benjamin Meyer

=== U.S. Open Cup ===
The Colorado Springs Switchbacks, as a member of the second division USL Championship, entered the U.S. Open Cup in the Third Round based on its performance in the 2024 USL Championship season.

April 16 Third Round	Colorado Springs Switchbacks	3–2 (a.e.t.)	(Tennessee) One Knoxville SC	Colorado Springs, Colorado
9:00 pm MDT	Echevarria 49'; Micaletto 81'; Fontana 103' (yellow card) 105'; Hanya (yellow card) 120+1'	Report	Diene 2'; Caputo (yellow card) 25'; Zarokostas (yellow card) 54' (goal) 83' (red card) 120'; Kelly-Rosales (yellow card) 85'	Stadium: Weidner Field; Referee: Jay Schlesinger

May 6 Round of 32	Colorado Springs Switchbacks	1–4	(New York (state)) New York Red Bulls	Colorado Springs, Colorado
9:30 pm MDT	Fontana 71'	Report	Sofo 16', 44'; Gjengaar 64' (yellow card) 87'; Hack (yellow card) 80'; Nealis 85' (yellow card) 87'; Edwards (yellow card) 90+3'	Stadium: Weidner Field; Attendance: 2,500; Referee: Christopher Calderon
