= 2015 St Patrick's Athletic F.C. season =

St Patrick's Athletic F.C.
2015 season
- Chairman: Garrett Kelleher
- Coach: Liam Buckley
- Stadium: Richmond Park
- League of Ireland: 4th
- FAI Cup: Third round (eliminated by Cork City)
- EA Sports Cup: Champions
- Leinster Senior Cup: Semi Final (eliminated by Dundalk)
- President's Cup: Runners-up (to Dundalk)
- Europa League: First Qualifying Round (eliminated by Skonto)
- Top goalscorer: League: Chris Forrester (11); All: Chris Forrester (12)
- Highest home attendance: 2,591 vs Shamrock Rovers (11 May 2015)
- Lowest home attendance: 375 (Est.) vs Dundalk (22 September 2015)
| Home colours | Away colours | Third colours |

The 2015 season was St. Patrick's Athletic F.C.'s 86th year in existence and was the Supersaint's 64th consecutive season in the top-flight of Irish football. It was the fourth year that Liam Buckley was the team's manager (in his current spell), following replacing Pete Mahon in December 2011. The Saints aimed to retain their FAI Cup, President's Cup and Leinster Senior Cup titles that were won during the 2014 season. Pats also competed in the UEFA Europa League and the EA Sports Cup. The 2015 League of Ireland fixtures were released on 16 December 2014, with the Saints' first game being an away fixture against South Dublin rivals Shamrock Rovers on 6 March 2015. The season turned out to be a very disappointing one for players, management and fans alike as the Saints finished of way off the top of the league, only securing European football on the final day, were knocked out of the FAI Cup at the early stages and failed to get past the first hurdle in the Europa League. However they did win the 2015 League of Ireland Cup on penalties versus Galway United on 19 September 2015, completing the set of trophies for manager Liam Buckley, meaning he has won every trophy possible to win with the Saints in the last three seasons. During the season, the team also set a club record winning streak in the league that stretched 9 games, beating the previous record of 8.

== Squad ==
| No. | Name | Position(s) | Nationality | Hometown | Date of birth (age) | Previous club | Year signed | Club Apps. | Club Goals |
Goalkeepers
| 1 | Brendan Clarke | GK | (Republic of Ireland) | Inchicore, Dublin | 17 September 1985 (age 40) | (Republic of Ireland) Sligo Rovers | 2012 | 169 | 0 |
| 16 | Conor O'Malley | GK | (Republic of Ireland) | Westport, County Mayo | 1 August 1994 (age 32) | (Republic of Ireland) Shamrock Rovers B | 2015 | 21 | 0 |
| 25 | Pat Jennings | GK | (England) | (England) Watford, Hertfordshire | 24 September 1979 (age 46) | (Republic of Ireland) Athlone Town | 2013 | 3 | 0 |
Defenders
| 2 | Ger O'Brien (Captain) | RB/CB | (Republic of Ireland) | Inchicore, Dublin | 2 June 1984 (age 42) | (Republic of Ireland) Bohemians | 2012 | 149 | 2 |
| 3 | Ian Bermingham (Vice-captain) | LB | (Republic of Ireland) | Ballyfermot, Dublin | 6 June 1989 (age 37) | (Republic of Ireland) Shamrock Rovers | 2010 | 239 | 5 |
| 4 | Jason McGuinness | CB | (Republic of Ireland) | Finglas, County Dublin | 8 August 1982 (age 44) | (Republic of Ireland) Shamrock Rovers | 2015 | 19 | 1 |
| 5 | Seán Hoare | CB | (Republic of Ireland) | Castleknock, Dublin | 5 March 1994 (age 32) | (Republic of Ireland) St Patrick's Athletic Under 19's | 2012 | 67 | 3 |
| 12 | Lee Desmond | CB/LB/RB | (Republic of Ireland) | Donaghmede, Dublin | 22 January 1995 (age 31) | (Republic of Ireland) Shelbourne | 2015 | 35 | 0 |
| 15 | Kenny Browne | CB | (Republic of Ireland) | Waterford | 7 August 1986 (age 40) | (Republic of Ireland) Waterford United | 2012 | 140 | 4 |
| 22 | Shane McEleney | CB/CDM | (Northern Ireland) | Derry, Northern Ireland | 26 September 1992 (age 33) | (Republic of Ireland) Derry City | 2015 | 9 | 0 |
| 24 | Paul Rooney | CB | (Republic of Ireland) | Blanchardstown, Dublin | 22 March 1997 (age 29) | (Republic of Ireland) St Patrick's Athletic Under 19's | 2014 | 1 | 0 |
Midfielders
| 6 | Greg Bolger | CDM/CM | (Republic of Ireland) | New Ross, County Wexford | 9 September 1988 (age 38) | (Republic of Ireland) Dundalk | 2012 | 145 | 9 |
| 7 | Conan Byrne | RW | (Republic of Ireland) | Swords, County Dublin | 10 August 1985 (age 41) | (Republic of Ireland) Shelbourne | 2013 | 131 | 47 |
| 8 | Morgan Langley | RW/LW/CAM/ST | (United States) | (United States) Honolulu, Hawaii | 9 June 1989 (age 37) | (United States) Harrisburg City Islanders | 2015 | 27 | 5 |
| 11 | Killian Brennan | CAM/CM/CB | (Republic of Ireland) | Drogheda, County Louth | 31 January 1984 (age 42) | (Republic of Ireland) Shamrock Rovers | 2013 | 108 | 20 |
| 14 | James Chambers | CDM/CM/RB | (Republic of Ireland) | Baldoyle, Dublin | 14 February 1987 (age 39) | (Republic of Ireland) Shamrock Rovers | 2014 | 118 | 7 |
| 17 | Chris Forrester | LW/RW/CAM | (Republic of Ireland) | Smithfield, Dublin | 17 December 1992 (age 33) | (Republic of Ireland) Bohemians | 2012 | 158 | 43 |
| 18 | Sam Verdon | CM/ST | (Republic of Ireland) | Kilbarrack, Dublin | 3 September 1995 (age 31) | (Republic of Ireland) St Patrick's Athletic Under 19's | 2013 | 20 | 4 |
| 19 | Jamie McGrath | LW/RW/ST/CF | (Republic of Ireland) | Athboy, County Meath | 30 September 1996 (age 29) | (Republic of Ireland) St Patrick's Athletic Under 19's | 2014 | 35 | 3 |
| 20 | Aaron Greene | LW/ST/LB | (Republic of Ireland) | Templeogue, Dublin | 2 January 1990 (age 36) | (Republic of Ireland) Sligo Rovers | 2014 | 49 | 12 |
| 21 | Darragh Markey | CAM/RW | (Republic of Ireland) | Lucan, Dublin | 23 May 1997 (age 29) | (Republic of Ireland) St Patrick's Athletic Under 19's | 2015 | 8 | 0 |
| 22 | Conor McCormack | CDM/CM/RB | (Republic of Ireland) | Carlingford, County Louth | 19 June 1990 (age 36) | (Republic of Ireland) Shamrock Rovers | 2014 | 58 | 0 |
| 26 | Jack Bayly | CAM/CM | (Republic of Ireland) | Celbridge, County Kildare | 18 June 1996 (age 30) | (Republic of Ireland) St Patrick's Athletic Under 19's | 2013 | 11 | 3 |
| 27 | Ian Morris | CM/CB | (Republic of Ireland) | Shankill, Dublin | 27 February 1987 (age 39) | (England) Northampton Town | 2015 | 11 | 0 |
Forwards
| 9 | Christy Fagan | ST/CF | (Republic of Ireland) | Smithfield, Dublin | 11 May 1989 (age 37) | (Republic of Ireland) Bohemians | 2012 | 142 | 63 |
| 10 | Ciarán Kilduff | ST/CF | (Republic of Ireland) | Kilcock, County Kildare | 29 September 1988 (age 37) | (Republic of Ireland) Shamrock Rovers | 2015 | 16 | 5 |
| 23 | Cyril Guedjé | ST/RW | (Togo) | Tsévié, Maritime Region, Togo | 19 June 1992 (age 34) | AS Togo-Port | 2015 | 2 | 0 |

=== Transfers ===
==== In ====
| Player | Country | Position | Signed From |
| Ciarán Kilduff | (Republic of Ireland) | Forward | (Republic of Ireland) Shamrock Rovers |
| Jason McGuinness | (Republic of Ireland) | Defender | (Republic of Ireland) Shamrock Rovers |
| Lee Desmond | (Republic of Ireland) | Defender | (Republic of Ireland) Shelbourne |
| Conor O'Malley | (Republic of Ireland) | Goalkeeper | (Republic of Ireland) Shamrock Rovers B |
| Cyril Guedjé | (Togo) | Midfielder | AS Togo-Port |
| Morgan Langley | (United States) | Midfielder | (United States) Harrisburg City Islanders |

==== Out ====
| Player | Country | Position | Sold To |
| Keith Fahey | (Republic of Ireland) | Midfielder | (Republic of Ireland) Shamrock Rovers |
| Marco Chindea | (Romania) | Midfielder | (Republic of Ireland) Athlone Town |
| Lorcan Fitzgerald | (Republic of Ireland) | Defender | (Republic of Ireland) Bohemians |
| Peter Durrad | (Republic of Ireland) | Forward | (Republic of Ireland) Bray Wanderers |
| Ken Oman | (Republic of Ireland) | Defender | (Northern Ireland) Portadown |
| Derek Foran | (Republic of Ireland) | Defender | (United States) Sacramento Republic |
| Mark Quigley | (Republic of Ireland) | Forward | Released |

==== In ====
| Player | Country | Position | Signed From |
| Ian Morris | (Republic of Ireland) | Midfielder | (England) Northampton Town |
| Shane McEleney | (Northern Ireland) | Defender | (Republic of Ireland) Derry City |

==== Out ====
| Player | Country | Position | Signed From |
| Ciarán Kilduff | (Republic of Ireland) | Forward | (Republic of Ireland) Dundalk |
| Conor McCormack | (Republic of Ireland) | Midfielder | (Republic of Ireland) Derry City |
| Cyril Guedjé | (Togo) | Forward | (Republic of Ireland) Limerick (Loan) |
| Chris Forrester | (Republic of Ireland) | Midfielder | (England) Peterborough United |

=== Squad statistics ===
==== Appearances, goals and cards ====
Number in brackets represents (appearances of which were substituted ON). Last Updated – 8 November 2015

| No. | Player | Airtricity League | | FAI Cup | | EA Sports Cup | | Europa League | | Leinster Senior Cup | | President's Cup | | Total | |
| No. | Player | Apps | Goals | Apps | Goals | Apps | Goals | Apps | Goals | Apps | Goals | Apps | Goals | Apps | Goals |
|---|---|---|---|---|---|---|---|---|---|---|---|---|---|---|---|
| 1 | B.Clarke | 16 | 0 | 2 | 0 | 1 | 0 | 2 | 0 | 1 | 0 | 1 | 0 | 23 | 0 |
| 2 | G.O'Brien | 21 | 0 | 1 | 0 | 3 | 0 | 2 | 0 | 2 | 0 | 0 | 0 | 29 | 0 |
| 3 | I.Bermingham | 30 | 0 | 2 | 0 | 3 | 0 | 2 | 0 | 3 | 1 | 1 | 0 | 41 | 1 |
| 4 | J.McGuinness | 12(3) | 0 | 2 | 1 | 1 | 0 | 1(1) | 0 | 2 | 0 | 1 | 0 | 19(4) | 1 |
| 5 | S.Hoare | 22(2) | 0 | 2(1) | 0 | 2 | 0 | 1 | 0 | 1 | 0 | 1 | 0 | 29(3) | 0 |
| 6 | G.Bolger | 23(1) | 2 | 1 | 0 | 2 | 0 | 2 | 0 | 2 | 0 | 1 | 0 | 31(1) | 2 |
| 7 | C.Byrne | 29 | 7 | 2 | 1 | 3 | 0 | 1 | 0 | 3(1) | 1 | 1 | 0 | 39(1) | 9 |
| 8 | M.Langley | 18(15) | 3 | 2(2) | 0 | 4(1) | 0 | 1(1) | 0 | 2(1) | 2 | 0 | 0 | 27(20) | 5 |
| 9 | C.Fagan | 16 | 6 | 1 | 0 | 1(1) | 0 | 2 | 0 | 2 | 1 | 1 | 0 | 23(1) | 7 |
| 10 | C.Kilduff | 13(4) | 3 | 0 | 0 | 1(1) | 0 | 0 | 0 | 1(1) | 2 | 1(1) | 0 | 16(7) | 5 |
| 11 | K.Brennan | 25(1) | 4 | 2 | 0 | 3(1) | 0 | 2 | 0 | 1(1) | 1 | 1 | 0 | 34(3) | 5 |
| 12 | L.Desmond | 24(8) | 0 | 2 | 0 | 3 | 0 | 2(1) | 0 | 3(2) | 0 | 1(1) | 0 | 35(12) | 0 |
| 14 | J.Chambers | 32(3) | 4 | 2 | 0 | 4(1) | 1 | 1 | 0 | 2 | 0 | 1 | 0 | 42(4) | 5 |
| 15 | K.Browne | 18 | 0 | 0 | 0 | 3 | 0 | 2 | 0 | 1 | 0 | 0 | 0 | 24 | 0 |
| 16 | C.O'Malley | 17 | 0 | 0 | 0 | 3 | 0 | 0 | 0 | 1 | 0 | 0 | 0 | 21 | 0 |
| 17 | C.Forrester | 24 | 11 | 2 | 0 | 3(2) | 0 | 2 | 0 | 1 | 0 | 1 | 1 | 33(2) | 12 |
| 18 | S.Verdon | 9(6) | 0 | 0 | 0 | 2 | 2 | 0 | 0 | 2(1) | 0 | 0 | 0 | 13(7) | 2 |
| 19 | J.McGrath | 23(9) | 2 | 2(2) | 0 | 4(1) | 0 | 2(2) | 0 | 2 | 1 | 0 | 0 | 33(14) | 3 |
| 20 | A.Greene | 31(2) | 9 | 2 | 0 | 2(1) | 0 | 2 | 1 | 1 | 0 | 0 | 0 | 38(3) | 10 |
| 21 | D.Markey | 4(4) | 0 | 0 | 0 | 1(1) | 0 | 0 | 0 | 2(1) | 0 | 1(1) | 0 | 8(7) | 0 |
| 22 | C.McCormack | 15(10) | 0 | 1(1) | 0 | 2 | 0 | 0 | 0 | 1 | 0 | 1 | 0 | 20(11) | 0 |
| 22 | S.McEleney | 8 | 0 | 0 | 0 | 0 | 0 | 0 | 0 | 1 | 0 | 0 | 0 | 9 | 0 |
| 23 | C.Guedjé | 1(1) | 0 | 0 | 0 | 1 | 0 | 0 | 0 | 0 | 0 | 0 | 0 | 2(1) | 0 |
| 24 | P.Rooney | 0 | 0 | 0 | 0 | 0 | 0 | 0 | 0 | 1 | 0 | 0 | 0 | 1 | 0 |
| 25 | P.Jennings | 0 | 0 | 0 | 0 | 0 | 0 | 0 | 0 | 1 | 0 | 0 | 0 | 1 | 0 |
| 26 | J.Bayly | 4(4) | 0 | 0 | 0 | 2 | 1 | 0 | 0 | 1 | 0 | 0 | 0 | 7(4) | 1 |
| 27 | I.Morris | 7(5 | 0 | 0 | 0 | 2(2) | 0 | 0 | 0 | 1 | 0 | 0 | 0 | 10(7) | 0 |

==== Top scorers ====
Includes all competitive matches. Last updated 8 November 2015

| Number | Name | Airtricity League | FAI Cup | EA Sports Cup | Europa League | Leinster Senior Cup | President's Cup | Total |
|---|---|---|---|---|---|---|---|---|
| 17 | Chris Forrester | 11 | 0 | 0 | 0 | 0 | 1 | 12 |
| 20 | Aaron Greene | 9 | 0 | 0 | 1 | 0 | 0 | 10 |
| 7 | Conan Byrne | 7 | 1 | 0 | 0 | 1 | 0 | 9 |
| 9 | Christy Fagan | 6 | 0 | 0 | 0 | 1 | 0 | 7 |
| 14 | James Chambers | 5 | 0 | 1 | 0 | 0 | 0 | 6 |
| 8 | Morgan Langley | 3 | 0 | 0 | 0 | 2 | 0 | 5 |
| 11 | Killian Brennan | 4 | 0 | 0 | 0 | 1 | 0 | 5 |
| 10 | Ciarán Kilduff | 3 | 0 | 0 | 0 | 2 | 0 | 5 |
| 19 | Jamie McGrath | 2 | 0 | 0 | 0 | 1 | 0 | 3 |
| 26 | Jack Bayly | 0 | 0 | 1 | 0 | 1 | 0 | 2 |
| 6 | Greg Bolger | 2 | 0 | 0 | 0 | 0 | 0 | 2 |
| 18 | Sam Verdon | 0 | 0 | 2 | 0 | 0 | 0 | 2 |
| 4 | Jason McGuinness | 0 | 1 | 0 | 0 | 0 | 0 | 1 |
| 3 | Ian Bermingham | 0 | 0 | 0 | 0 | 1 | 0 | 1 |
| - | Own goal | 0 | 0 | 1 | 0 | 1 | 0 | 2 |

==== Top Clean Sheets ====
Includes all competitive matches. Last updated 8 November 2015

| Position | Number | Name | Airtricity League | FAI Cup | EA Sports Cup | Europa League | Leinster Senior Cup | President's Cup | Total |
|---|---|---|---|---|---|---|---|---|---|
| GK | 1 | Brendan Clarke | 7/16 | 0/2 | 0/1 | 0/2 | 1/1 | 0/1 | 8/23 |
| GK | 16 | Conor O'Malley | 7/17 | 0/0 | 2/3 | 0/0 | 1/1 | 0/0 | 10/21 |
| GK | 25 | Pat Jennings | 0/0 | 0/0 | 0/0 | 0/0 | 0/1 | 0/0 | 0/1 |

==== Disciplinary record ====
| Number | Name | Airtricity League | | FAI Cup | | EA Sports Cup | | Europa League | | Leinster Senior Cup | | President's Cup | | Total | |
| Number | Name | Booked | Sent off (straight red) | Booked | Sent off (straight red) | Booked | Sent off (straight red) | Booked | Sent off (straight red) | Booked | Sent off (straight red) | Booked | Sent off (straight red) | Booked | Sent off (straight red) |
| 6 | Greg Bolger | 11 | 0 | 0 | 0 | 1 | 0 | 1 | 0 | 0 | 0 | 1 | 0 | 14 | 0 |
| 3 | Ian Bermingham | 9 | 1 | 0 | 0 | 1 | 0 | 0 | 0 | 0 | 0 | 0 | 0 | 10 | 1 |
| 11 | Killian Brennan | 4 | 1 | 1 | 0 | 1 | 0 | 1 | 0 | 0 | 0 | 0 | 0 | 7 | 1 |
| 15 | Kenny Browne | 7 | 1 | 0 | 0 | 0 | 0 | 1 | 0 | 0 | 0 | 0 | 0 | 8 | 1 |
| 20 | Aaron Greene | 7 | 0 | 0 | 0 | 0 | 0 | 0 | 0 | 0 | 0 | 0 | 0 | 7 | 0 |
| 12 | Lee Desmond | 5 | 1 | 0 | 0 | 0 | 0 | 0 | 0 | 0 | 0 | 0 | 0 | 5 | 1 |
| 14 | James Chambers | 2 | 0 | 1 | 0 | 1 | 0 | 1 | 0 | 0 | 0 | 1 | 0 | 6 | 0 |
| 8 | Morgan Langley | 2 | 0 | 1 | 0 | 3 | 0 | 0 | 0 | 0 | 0 | 0 | 0 | 6 | 0 |
| 4 | Jason McGuinness | 4 | 1 | 0 | 0 | 0 | 0 | 0 | 0 | 0 | 0 | 0 | 0 | 4 | 1 |
| 22 | Conor McCormack | 3 | 1 | 1 | 0 | 0 | 0 | 0 | 0 | 0 | 0 | 0 | 0 | 4 | 1 |
| 17 | Chris Forrester | 4 | 0 | 0 | 0 | 0 | 0 | 1 | 0 | 0 | 0 | 0 | 0 | 5 | 0 |
| 9 | Christy Fagan | 4 | 0 | 0 | 0 | 0 | 0 | 0 | 0 | 0 | 0 | 0 | 0 | 4 | 0 |
| 5 | Seán Hoare | 4 | 0 | 0 | 0 | 0 | 0 | 0 | 0 | 0 | 0 | 0 | 0 | 4 | 0 |
| 7 | Conan Byrne | 3 | 0 | 0 | 0 | 0 | 0 | 0 | 0 | 0 | 0 | 0 | 0 | 3 | 0 |
| 2 | Ger O'Brien | 1 | 0 | 1 | 0 | 0 | 0 | 1 | 0 | 0 | 0 | 0 | 0 | 3 | 0 |
| 18 | Sam Verdon | 2 | 0 | 0 | 0 | 0 | 0 | 0 | 0 | 0 | 0 | 0 | 0 | 2 | 0 |
| 19 | Jamie McGrath | 1 | 0 | 0 | 0 | 1 | 0 | 0 | 0 | 0 | 0 | 0 | 0 | 2 | 0 |
| 10 | Ciarán Kilduff | 2 | 0 | 0 | 0 | 0 | 0 | 0 | 0 | 0 | 0 | 0 | 0 | 2 | 0 |
| 27 | Ian Morris | 1 | 0 | 0 | 0 | 0 | 0 | 0 | 0 | 0 | 0 | 0 | 0 | 1 | 0 |
| 1 | Brendan Clarke | 1 | 0 | 0 | 0 | 0 | 0 | 0 | 0 | 0 | 0 | 0 | 0 | 1 | 0 |
| 26 | Jack Bayly | 0 | 0 | 0 | 0 | 1 | 0 | 0 | 0 | 0 | 0 | 0 | 0 | 1 | 0 |
| | TOTALS | 77 | 6 | 5 | 0 | 9 | 0 | 6 | 0 | 0 | 0 | 2 | 0 | 99 | 6 |

==== Captains ====
| No. | P | Name | Country | No. games | Notes |
|---|---|---|---|---|---|
| 2 | DF | Ger O'Brien | (Republic of Ireland) | 29 | Captain |
| 3 | DF | Ian Bermingham | (Republic of Ireland) | 15 | Vice-captain |
| 11 | MF | Killian Brennan | (Republic of Ireland) | 1 | |

Last updated: 8 November 2015
Source: Competitive match reports.
Competitive matches only
Matches started as captain only
Country: FIFA nationality; No.: Squad number; P: Position; Name: Player name; No. Games: Number of games started as captain.

== Club ==
=== Technical Staff ===
- Manager: Liam Buckley
- Assistant manager: Richie Smith
- Head Of Player Recruitment / Coach: Dave Campbell
- Coach: Darius Kierans
- Coach: Alan Reynolds
- Goalkeeping coach: Pat Jennings
- Strength and Conditioning Coach: Paul Stewart
- Video Analyst: Jason Donohue
- Coaches Assistant: Graeme Buckley
- Chartered Physiotherapist: Fionn Daly
- Physiotherapist: Christy O'Neill
- Club Doctor: Dr Matt Corcoran
- Kit Man: Derek Haines
- Equipment Manager: Gerry Molloy
- Under 19's Management: Cyril Walsh & Richie Smith (2014–15), Gareth Dodrill (2015)

=== Kit ===
Supplier: Umbro
Sponsor(s): Clune Construction Company L.P. (Front of Jersey), Iceland (Sleeve of jersey)

| Home | Home Alt | Home 2nd Alt | Away | Away Alt | Third |

The club's Home kit was retained from the 2014 season, with the 2014 Away kit becoming the Third kit for 2015 and a new Away kit released for the season.

| Type | Shirt | Shorts | Socks | Info |
|---|---|---|---|---|
| Home | Red/White Sleeves | White | Red | Worn 27 times; against Bray Wanderers (H) (LOI), Derry City (H) (LOI), Limerick (A) LOI), Longford Town (A) (LOI), Crumlin United (A) (EAC), Cork City (H) (LOI), Drogheda United (H) (LOI), Sligo Rovers (H) (LOI), Shamrock Rovers (H) (LOI), Bray Wanderers (A) (LOI), Cork City (A) (EAC), Shamrock Rovers (H) (FAI), Bohemians (H) (LOI), Limerick (H) LOI), Longford Town (H) (LOI), Skonto (H) UEL), Manchester City XI (H) (FRN), Galway United (H) (LOI), Bray Wanderers (H) (LOI), Derry City (H) (LOI), Cork City (A) (LOI), Limerick (A) (LOI), Crumlin United (H) (LSC), Dundalk (H) (LSC), Drogheda United (H) (LOI), Cork City (H) (LOI), Sligo Rovers (H) (LOI) |
| Home Alt | Red/White Sleeves | White | White | Worn 7 times; against Bohemians (A) (LOI), Dundalk (H) (LOI), Drogheda United (A) (LOI), Cork City (H) (FAI), Galway United (A) (EAC), Longford Town (A) (LOI), Bohemians (A) (LOI) |
| Home 2nd Alt | Red/White Sleeves | Navy | White | Worn 1 time; against Galway United (A) (LOI) |
| Away | Navy/Red Sleeves | Navy | Navy | Worn 9 times; against Dundalk (A) (PRC), Shamrock Rovers (A) (LOI), Dundalk (A) (LOI), Galway United (A) (LOI), Derry City (A) (LOI), Sligo Rovers (A) (LOI), Shamrock Rovers (A) (EAC), Shamrock Rovers (A) (LOI), Dundalk (A) (LOI) |
| Away Alt | Navy/Red Sleeves | Navy | White | Worn 1 time; against Skonto (A) (UEL) |
| Third | Blue/Wine Stripes | Blue | Blue | Worn 4 times; against Wexford Youths (A) (FRN), Cabinteely (H) (FRN), Shelbourne (A) (FRN), Tolka Rovers (H) (LSC) |

Key:
LOI=League of Ireland
FAI=FAI Cup
EAC= EA Sports Cup
UEL=Europa League
LSC=Leinster Senior Cup
PRC=President's Cup
FRN=Friendly

==== Televised Matches ====
| Time and Date | Channel | Competition | Opposition | Score | Location |
|---|---|---|---|---|---|
| 19:45 GMT 6 March 2015 | RTÉ Two | League of Ireland | Shamrock Rovers | 1–0 Loss | Tallaght Stadium |
| 20:00 GMT 26 June 2015 | Setanta Ireland | League of Ireland | Longford Town | 3–0 Win | Richmond Park |
| 19:00 EET 2 July 2015 | Setanta 1 | Europa League | Skonto | 2–1 Loss | Skonto Stadium |
| 20:00 GMT 24 July 2015 | Setanta Ireland | League of Ireland | Sligo Rovers | 3–0 Win | The Showgrounds |
| 20:00 GMT 7 August 2015 | Setanta Ireland | League of Ireland | Shamrock Rovers | 2–0 Win | Tallaght Stadium |
| 19:25 GMT 23 August 2015 | RTÉ Two | FAI Cup | Cork City | 4–0 Loss | Turners Cross |
| 18:05 GMT 19 September 2015 | Setanta Ireland | League Cup Final | Galway United | 0–0, 4–3 Win on Penalties | Eamonn Deacy Park |

== Competitions ==
=== League of Ireland ===
The 2015 League of Ireland fixtures were announced on 16 December 2014. St Patrick's Athletic were revealed to have a Dublin Derby against Shamrock Rovers away from home on the first day of the season. The Saints' first home fixture would be against Bray Wanderers on the second day of the season.

==== League table ====
| Pos | Team | Pld | W | D | L | GF | GA | GD | Pts | Qualification or relegation |
|---|---|---|---|---|---|---|---|---|---|---|
| 2 | Cork City | 33 | 19 | 10 | 4 | 57 | 25 | +32 | 67 | Qualification for Europa League first qualifying round |
| 3 | Shamrock Rovers | 33 | 18 | 11 | 4 | 56 | 27 | +29 | 65 | Qualification for Europa League first qualifying round |
| 4 | St Patrick's Athletic | 33 | 18 | 4 | 11 | 52 | 34 | +18 | 58 | Qualification for Europa League first qualifying round |
| 5 | Bohemians | 33 | 15 | 8 | 10 | 49 | 42 | +7 | 53 | |
| 6 | Longford Town | 33 | 10 | 9 | 14 | 41 | 53 | −12 | 39 | |

Source: League of Ireland, Soccerway
Rules for classification: 1) Points; 2) Goal difference; 3) Goals scored.

==== Results summary ====
| Overall | | | | | | | | Home | | | | | | Away | | | | | |
| Pld | W | D | L | GF | GA | GD | Pts | W | D | L | GF | GA | GD | W | D | L | GF | GA | GD |
|---|---|---|---|---|---|---|---|---|---|---|---|---|---|---|---|---|---|---|---|
| 33 | 18 | 4 | 11 | 52 | 34 | +18 | 58 | 9 | 3 | 4 | 26 | 13 | +13 | 9 | 1 | 7 | 26 | 21 | +5 |

Last updated: 8 November 2015.

==== Results by round ====
| Round | 1 | 2 | 3 | 4 | 5 | 6 | 7 | 8 | 9 | 10 | 11 | 12 | 13 | 14 | 15 | 16 | 17 | 18 | 19 | 20 | 21 | 22 | 23 | 24 | 25 | 26 | 27 | 28 | 29 | 30 | 31 | 32 | 33 |
|---|---|---|---|---|---|---|---|---|---|---|---|---|---|---|---|---|---|---|---|---|---|---|---|---|---|---|---|---|---|---|---|---|---|
| Ground | A | H | A | H | A | A | H | A | H | H | A | H | A | H | A | H | H | A | H | A | A | H | A | H | A | H | A | H | A | A | H | H | A |
| Result | L | W | L | W | W | D | D | W | D | W | W | D | L | L | W | W | W | L | W | W | W | W | W | W | L | L | L | L | W | L | W | L | W |
| Position | 9 | 6 | 7 | 6 | 5 | 5 | 5 | 5 | 5 | 5 | 4 | 5 | 5 | 5 | 5 | 4 | 4 | 4 | 4 | 3 | 3 | 3 | 3 | 3 | 4 | 4 | 4 | 4 | 4 | 4 | 4 | 4 | 4 |

Updated to match(es) played on 8 November 2015. Source: 2015 League of Ireland
A = Away; H = Home; W = Win; D = Draw; L = Loss

==== Matches ====
Win Draw Loss

| 6 March 2015 Round 1 | Shamrock Rovers | 1–0 | St Patrick's Athletic | Tallaght, Dublin |
| 20:00 GMT | Danny North 15'; Sean O'Connor (yellow card) 78' | | Kenny Browne (yellow card) 42'; Conor McCormack (yellow card) 58'; Christy Fagan (yellow card) 64'; Jason McGuinness (yellow card) 68'; Greg Bolger (yellow card) 90+5' | Stadium: Tallaght Stadium; Attendance: 4,483; Referee: Padraigh Sutton |

| 13 March 2015 Round 2 | St Patrick's Athletic | 3–0 | Bray Wanderers | Inchicore, Dublin |
| 19:45 GMT | Killian Brennan 4' (pen.); Chris Forrester 5'; Christy Fagan (yellow card) 27'; Christy Fagan 60'; Chris Forrester (yellow card) 63'; Aaron Greene (yellow card) 90+3' | | Michael Barker (yellow card) 87'; Graham Kelly (yellow card) 90' | Stadium: Richmond Park; Attendance: 1,329; Referee: Dereek Tomney |

| 20 March 2015 Round 3 | Dundalk | 3–0 | St Patrick's Athletic | Dundalk, County Louth |
| 19:45 GMT | Brian Gartland 16'; Brian Gartland (yellow card) 24'; David McMillan 67'; David McMillan 85' | | Conor McCormack (yellow card) 19'; Conor McCormack (yellow card) 44' (red card); Kenny Browne (yellow card) 45'; Killian Brennan (red card) 61'; Greg Bolger (yellow card) 71' | Stadium: Oriel Park; Attendance: 3,749; Referee: Paul McLaughlin |

| 24 March 2015 Round 4 | St Patrick's Athletic | 2–0 | Derry City | Inchicore, Dublin |
| 19:45 GMT | Greg Bolger 35'; James Chambers (yellow card) 45'; Morgan Langley 82'; Chris Forrester (yellow card) 90+3' | | Ryan McBride (yellow card) 81'; Cillian Morrison (yellow card) 90'; Seanan Clucas (yellow card) 90+1' | Stadium: Richmond Park; Attendance: 942; Referee: Anthony Buttimer |

| 28 March 2015 Round 5 | Limerick | 1–2 | St Patrick's Athletic | Limerick |
| 18:30 GMT | Ian Turner 75'; Jason Hughes (yellow card) 89' | | Aaron Greene 31'; Aaron Greene 71'; Kenny Browne (yellow card) 74'; Seán Hoare (yellow card) 85' | Stadium: Jackman Park; Attendance: 425; Referee: Sean Grant |

| 4 April 2015 Round 6 | Longford Town | 2–2 | St Patrick's Athletic | Mullolagher, County Longford |
| 19:30 GMT | Kevin O'Connor 6'; Mark Salmon 16' (pen.); Don Cowan (yellow card) 39'; Mark Salmon (yellow card) 64'; Willie Tyrell (yellow card) 64' | | Ian Bermingham (yellow card) 15'; Chris Forrester 23'; Ian Bermingham (yellow card) 26' (red card); Conan Byrne 67'; Greg Bolger (yellow card) 78'; Morgan Langley (yellow card) 89' | Stadium: City Calling Stadium; Attendance: 1,024; Referee: Neil Doyle |

| 10 April 2015 Round 7 | St Patrick's Athletic | 0–0 | Cork City | Inchicore, Dublin |
| 19:45 GMT | Lee Desmond (yellow card) 21'; Lee Desmond (yellow card) 75' (red card); Ger O'Brien (yellow card) 75'; Killian Brennan (yellow card) 79' | | John Dunleavy (yellow card) 18'; Karl Sheppard (yellow card) 38' | Stadium: Richmond Park; Attendance: 1,728; Referee: Derek Tomney |

| 17 April 2015 Round 8 | Bohemians | 0–1 | St Patrick's Athletic | Phibsborough, Dublin |
| 19:45 GMT | Paddy Kavanagh (yellow card) 56' | | Ciarán Kilduff 35'; Chris Forrester (yellow card) 62'; Killian Brennan (penalty missed) 70'; Ciarán Kilduff (yellow card) 80' | Stadium: Dalymount Park; Attendance: 2,451; Referee: Graham Kelly |

| 20 April 2015 Round 9 | St Patrick's Athletic | 2–2 | Drogheda United | Inchicore, Dublin |
| 19:45 GMT | Conan Byrne 45'; Ciarán Kilduff 60'; Greg Bolger (yellow card) 86' | | Lloyd Buckley 33'; Lee Duffy (yellow card) 80'; Lee Duffy 83' (pen.) | Stadium: Richmond Park; Attendance: 1,000 (Est.); Referee: Robert Harvey |

| 24 April 2015 Round 10 | St Patrick's Athletic | 3–0 | Sligo Rovers | Inchicore, Dublin |
| 19:45 GMT | Aaron Greene 18'; Ciarán Kilduff (yellow card) 41'; Aaron Greene 58'; Chris Forrester 85' | | Gary Boylan (yellow card) 21'; Steven Beattie (yellow card) 25'; Richard Brush (yellow card) 68' | Stadium: Richmond Park; Attendance: 1,259; Referee: Paul Tuite |

| 1 May 2015 Round 11 | Galway United | 1–4 | St Patrick's Athletic | Galway |
| 19:45 GMT | David O'Leary 48'; David O'Leary (yellow card) 55'; Alex Byrne (red card) 86' | | Killian Brennan 25' (pen.); Conan Byrne 39'; Killian Brennan (yellow card) 55'; Ciarán Kilduff 66'; Conan Byrne 78' | Stadium: Eamonn Deacy Park; Attendance: 1,355; Referee: James McKell |

| 11 May 2015 Round 12 | St Patrick's Athletic | 0–0 | Shamrock Rovers | Inchicore, Dublin |
| 19:45 GMT | Greg Bolger (yellow card) 49'; Killian Brennan (yellow card) 88'; Sam Verdon (yellow card) 90+3' | | Pat Cregg (yellow card) 36'; Conor Kenna (yellow card) 51' | Stadium: Richmond Park; Attendance: 2,591; Referee: David McKeon |
Note: This fixture was originally scheduled for 8 May but was postponed due to a waterlogged pitch at Richmond Park.

| 16 May 2015 Round 13 | Bray Wanderers | 1–0 | St Patrick's Athletic | Bray, County Wicklow |
| 17:45 GMT | Ryan McEvoy (yellow card) 54'; Adam Hanlon (yellow card) 65'; Peter McGlynn 75' | | Conan Byrne (yellow card) 73' | Stadium: Carlisle Grounds; Attendance: 1,000 (Est.); Referee: Padraig Sutton |

| 22 May 2015 Round 14 | St Patrick's Athletic | 0–2 | Dundalk | Inchicore, Dublin |
| 19:45 GMT | Conan Byrne (yellow card) 26'; Kenny Browne (yellow card) 29'; Kenny Browne (yellow card) 35' (red card); Christy Fagan (yellow card) 37'; Greg Bolger (yellow card) 55' | | Daryl Horgan 29'; David McMillan (yellow card) 53'; Daryl Horgan 61'; Andy Boyle (yellow card) 72' | Stadium: Richmond Park; Attendance: 2,200 (Est.); Referee: Neil Doyle |

| 5 June 2015 Round 15 | Derry City | 0–3 | St Patrick's Athletic | Derry, Northern Ireland |
| 19:45 GMT | Patrick McEleney (yellow card) 32'; Aaron Barry (yellow card) 63'; Philip Lowry (yellow card) 66' | | Aaron Greene 26'; James Chambers 56'; Aaron Greene (yellow card) 57'; Greg Bolger (yellow card) 90+3'; Chris Forrester 90+4' | Stadium: The Brandywell; Attendance: 1,200 (Est.); Referee: Derek Tomney |

| 9 June 2015 Round 19 | St Patrick's Athletic | 3–1 | Bohemians | Inchicore, Dublin |
| 19:45 GMT | Christy Fagan 22'; Christy Fagan 51'; Ian Bermingham (yellow card) 63'; Killian Brennan 69' | | Lorcan Fitzgerald (yellow card) 10'; Derek Prendergast 33'; Dylan Hayes (yellow card) 41'; Karl Moore (yellow card) 52'; James O'Brien (yellow card) 76' | Stadium: Richmond Park; Attendance: 2,000 (Est.); Referee: Padraigh Sutton |
Note: This fixture was due to be played on 10 July 2015 but was rescheduled to an earlier date due to St Patrick's Athletic's participation in the 2015–16 UEFA Europa League.

| 12 June 2015 Round 16 | St Patrick's Athletic | 3–1 | Limerick | Inchicore, Dublin |
| 19:45 GMT | Seán Hoare (yellow card) 20'; Chris Forrester 50'; Aaron Greene 54'; Christy Fagan 58' | | Dean Clarke 24'; Shane Duggan (yellow card) 56'; Ross Mann (yellow card) 89' | Stadium: Richmond Park; Attendance: 1,123; Referee: (Malta) Alan Mario Sant |

| 26 June 2015 Round 17 | St Patrick's Athletic | 3–0 | Longford Town | Inchicore, Dublin |
| 20:00 GMT | Chris Forrester 18'; Chris Forrester 43' (pen.); James Chambers 49' | | Paul Skinner (yellow card) 39'; Martin Deady (yellow card) 43' | Stadium: Richmond Park; Attendance: 1,165; Referee: Paul Tuite |

| 17 July 2015 Round 20 | Drogheda United | 0–2 | St Patrick's Athletic | Drogheda, County Louth |
| 19:45 GMT | Alan Byrne (yellow card) 6'; Tiarnan Mulvenna (yellow card) 49' | | Killian Brennan (penalty missed) 32'; Greg Bolger (yellow card) 43'; Aaron Greene (yellow card) 63'; Killian Brennan 75'; Jamie McGrath 90+3' | Stadium: United Park; Attendance: 1,000 (Est.); Referee: Rob Rogers |

| 24 July 2015 Round 21 | Sligo Rovers | 0–3 | St Patrick's Athletic | Sligo |
| 20:00 GMT | Keith Ward (yellow card) 24'; David Cawley (yellow card) 45+3' | | James Chambers (yellow card) 35'; Chris Forrester 62'; Jamie McGrath 72'; Chris Forrester 84' | Stadium: The Showgrounds; Attendance: 1,400; Referee: Graham Kelly |

| 31 July 2015 Round 22 | St Patrick's Athletic | 3–1 | Galway United | Inchicore, Dublin |
| 19:45 GMT | Chris Forrester 8'; Ian Bermingham (yellow card) 32'; Conan Byrne 57' (pen.); Conan Byrne 90+1' | | Jake Keegan 11'; Conor Winn (red card) 54' | Stadium: Richmond Park; Attendance: 1,036; Referee: Robert Harvey |

| 7 August 2015 Round 23 | Shamrock Rovers | 0–2 | St Patrick's Athletic | Tallaght, Dublin |
| 20:00 GMT | Pat Cregg (yellow card) 31'; Gavin Brennan (yellow card) 55'; Ryan Brennan (yellow card) 69'; Kieran Waters (red card) 90+2' | | Kenny Browne (yellow card) 39'; Ian Bermingham (yellow card) 45'; Chris Forrester 48'; Jamie McGrath (yellow card) 57'; Brendan Clarke (yellow card) 90+1'; Morgan Langley 90+5' | Stadium: Tallaght Stadium; Attendance: 3,500 (Est.); Referee: Rob Rogers |

| 14 August 2015 Round 24 | St Patrick's Athletic | 1–0 | Bray Wanderers | Inchicore, Dublin |
| 19:45 GMT | Greg Bolger 45'; Killian Brennan (yellow card) 67' | | Graham Kelly (yellow card) 65' | Stadium: Richmond Park; Attendance: 1,014; Referee: Padraigh Sutton |

| 17 August 2015 Round 25 | Dundalk | 4–1 | St Patrick's Athletic | Dundalk, County Louth |
| 19:45 GMT | Brian Gartland 6'; David McMillan 13'; David McMillan 32'; Sean Gannon (yellow card) 37'; Daryl Horgan 41'; Richie Towell (yellow card) 65'; Brian Gartland (yellow card) 74' | | James Chambers 38'; Ian Bermingham (yellow card) 48'; Chris Forrester (yellow card) 65'; Aaron Greene (yellow card) 65'; Lee Desmond (yellow card) 70' | Stadium: Oriel Park; Attendance: 3,782; Referee: David McKeon |

| 28 August 2015 Round 26 | St Patrick's Athletic | 0–1 | Derry City | Inchicore, Dublin |
| 19:45 GMT | Greg Bolger (yellow card) 33'; Lee Desmond (yellow card) 58'; Ian Bermingham (yellow card) 78'; Conan Byrne (penalty missed) 86' | | Cillian Morrison (yellow card) 14'; Ciaran O'Connor 19'; Cillian Morrison (yellow card) 41' (red card); Ryan McBride (yellow card) 85'; Mark Quigley (yellow card) 85' | Stadium: Richmond Park; Attendance: 926; Referee: Tomas Connolly |

| 31 August 2015 Round 18 | Cork City | 3–1 | St Patrick's Athletic | Turners Cross, Cork |
| 19:45 GMT | Alan Bennett 24'; Kevin O'Connor 28'; Michael McSweeney (yellow card) 53'; Darren Dennehy 60'; Ross Gaynor (yellow card) 72' | | Conan Byrne (yellow card) 33'; Jason McGuinness (yellow card) 40'; Morgan Langley 65'; Lee Desmond (yellow card) 90+2' | Stadium: Turners Cross; Attendance: 2,017; Referee: Neil Doyle |
Note: This fixture was originally scheduled for 3 July but was postponed due to both clubs participation in the 2015–16 UEFA Europa League on 2 July.

| 5 September 2015 Round 27 | Limerick | 3–1 | St Patrick's Athletic | Limerick |
| 19:00 GMT | Ian Turner 12'; Paul O'Conor 21'; Shaun Kelly (red card) 27'; Vinny Faherty 44'; Ian Turner 49'; Darragh Rainsford (yellow card) 90+3' | | Morgan Langley (yellow card) 27'; Greg Bolger (yellow card) 60'; James Chambers 81' | Stadium: Markets Field; Attendance: 1,662; Referee: Graham Kelly |

| 26 September 2015 Round 29 | Longford Town | 0–3 | St Patrick's Athletic | Mullolagher, County Longford |
| 19:30 GMT | Dean Kelly (yellow card) 44'; Stephen Rice (yellow card) 47'; Conor Powell (yellow card) 60' | | Christy Fagan 5'; James Chambers 24'; Greg Bolger (yellow card) 61'; Ian Morris (yellow card) 65'; Kenny Browne (yellow card) 73'; Sean Hoare (yellow card) 76'; Aaron Greene 76' | Stadium: City Calling Stadium; Attendance: 500 (Est.); Referee: David McKeon |

| 9 October 2015 Round 30 | Bohemians | 2–0 | St Patrick's Athletic | Phibsborough, Dublin |
| 19:45 GMT | Anthony Murphy 14'; Eoin Wearen (yellow card) 25'; Roberto Lopes (yellow card) 34'; Karl Moore 63' | | Sam Verdon (yellow card) 18'; Jason McGuinness (yellow card) 49'; Jason McGuinness (yellow card) 52' (red card); Christy Fagan (yellow card) 63'; Aaron Greene (yellow card) 84' | Stadium: Dalymount Park; Attendance: 2,055; Referee: Rob Harvey |

| 16 October 2015 Round 31 | St Patrick's Athletic | 2–1 | Drogheda United | Inchicore, Dublin |
| 19:45 GMT | Conan Byrne 54' (pen.); Christy Fagan 67'; Ian Bermingham (yellow card) 85' | | Alan Byrne 60' | Stadium: Richmond Park; Attendance: 836; Referee: Neil Doyle |

| 19 October 2015 Round 28 | St Patrick's Athletic | 1–2 | Cork City | Inchicore, Dublin |
| 19:45 GMT | Aaron Greene (yellow card) 44'; Aaron Greene 90' | | Steven Beattie 9'; Danny Morrissey 23'; Ross Gaynor (yellow card) 29'; Steven Beattie (yellow card) 44' | Stadium: Richmond Park; Attendance: 723; Referee: Derek Tomney |
Note: This fixture was originally scheduled for 18 September but was postponed to 19 October due to St Patrick's Athletic's participation in the 2015 League of Ireland Cup Final on 19 September.

| 23 October 2015 Round 32 | St Patrick's Athletic | 0–2 | Sligo Rovers | Inchicore, Dublin |
| 19:45 GMT | Ian Bermingham (yellow card) 74'; Aaron Greene (yellow card) 84' | | Morten Nielsen (yellow card) 25'; Raffaele Cretaro (yellow card) 35'; Daniel Corcoran 65'; Daniel Corcoran 77' (pen.) | Stadium: Richmond Park; Attendance: 971; Referee: Anthony Buttimer |

| 30 October 2015 Round 33 | Galway United | 0–1 | St Patrick's Athletic | Galway |
| 19:45 GMT | | | Aaron Greene 45' | Stadium: Eamonn Deacy Park; Attendance: 1,231; Referee: Padraigh Sutton |

=== FAI Cup ===
Win Draw Loss

==== Second round ====
| 29 May 2015 | St Patrick's Athletic | 2–1 | Shamrock Rovers | Inchicore, Dublin |
| 19:45 GMT | Killian Brennan (yellow card) 20'; Conan Byrne 32'; Jason McGuinness 37'; Morgan Langley (yellow card) 90+3'; Conor McCormack (yellow card) 90+5' | | Mikey Drennan (yellow card) 16'; Keith Fahey (yellow card) 18'; Luke Byrne (yellow card) 58'; Stephen McPhail (yellow card) 70'; Gary McCabe 84' | Stadium: Richmond Park; Attendance: 2,000 (Est.); Referee: Paul McLaughlin |

==== Third round ====
| 21 August 2015 | Cork City | 4–0 | St Patrick's Athletic | Turners Cross, Cork |
| 19:25 GMT | Dan Murray (yellow card) 32'; Colin Healy (yellow card) 42'; Garry Buckley 49'; Mark O'Sullivan 50'; Garry Buckley 63'; Billy Dennehy 88' | | Ger O'Brien (yellow card) 53'; James Chambers (yellow card) 79' | Stadium: Turners Cross; Attendance: 1,748; Referee: Paul McLoughlin |

=== EA Sports Cup ===
Win Draw Loss

==== Second round ====
| 7 April 2015 | Crumlin United | 1–4 | St Patrick's Athletic | Inchicore, Dublin |
| 19:45 GMT | James Lee (yellow card) 30'; Patrick Cannon 55'; Ger Rowe (yellow card) 60'; Ciaran Reilly (yellow card) 78'; Daniel Loughran (yellow card) 80' | | Sam Verdon 15'; Ross Carrig 67' (o.g.); James Chambers 71'; Sam Verdon 74'; Morgan Langley (yellow card) 82'; James Chambers (yellow card) 89' | Stadium: Richmond Park; Attendance: 487; Referee: Rob Rogers |
Note: Crumlin United were drawn as the home team but their Pearce Park home ground was deemed unsuitable to host this fixture and so they agreed to play the game in St Patrick's Athletic's home ground, Richmond Park.

==== Quarter-final ====
| 19 May 2015 | Cork City | 1–1 (a.e.t.) (3–5 p) | St Patrick's Athletic | Turners Cross, Cork |
| 19:45 GMT | Dan Murray (yellow card) 56'; Liam Kearney 64'; Garry Buckley (yellow card) 93'; Mark O'Sullivan (yellow card) 108' | | Jack Bayly (yellow card) 36'; Jack Bayly 60'; Ian Bermingham (yellow card) 84'; Jamie McGrath (yellow card) 86'; Morgan Langley (yellow card) 112' | Stadium: Turners Cross; Attendance: 930; Referee: Sean Grant |
| | Penalties |
| | Garry Buckley (penalty missed); Mark O'Sullivan (penalty scored); Ross Gaynor (penalty scored); Billy Dennehy (penalty scored) | | Killian Brennan (penalty scored); Conan Byrne (penalty scored); James Chambers (penalty scored); Conor McCormack (penalty scored); Chris Forrester (penalty scored) |

==== Semi-final ====
| 3 August 2015 | Shamrock Rovers | 0–0 (a.e.t.) (2–4 p) | St Patrick's Athletic | Tallaght, County Dublin |
| 16:00 GMT | Ryan Brennan (yellow card) 120+2' | | Killian Brennan (yellow card) 82'; Morgan Langley (yellow card) 120+2' | Stadium: Tallaght Stadium; Attendance: 1,400 (Est.); Referee: Paul Tuite |
| | Penalties |
| | Gary McCabe (penalty scored); Danny North (penalty scored); Michael Drennan (penalty missed); David O'Connor (penalty missed) | | Killian Brennan (penalty missed); Aaron Greene (penalty scored); Conan Byrne (penalty scored); James Chambers (penalty scored); Ian Morris (penalty scored) |

==== Final ====
| 19 September 2015 | Galway United | 0–0 (a.e.t.) (3–4 p) | St Patrick's Athletic | Galway |
| 18:05 GMT | Andy O'Connell (yellow card) 114' | | Greg Bolger (yellow card) 88' | Stadium: Eamonn Deacy Park; Attendance: 3,662; Referee: Paul McLaughlin |
| | Penalties |
| | Ryan Connolly (penalty scored); Jake Keegan (penalty missed); Stephen Walsh (penalty scored); Colm Horgan (penalty scored); Andy O'Connell (penalty missed) | | Conan Byrne (penalty scored); James Chambers (penalty scored); Christy Fagan (penalty scored); Ian Morris (penalty scored); Sean Hoare (penalty missed) |

=== Europa League ===
Win Draw Loss

==== First qualifying round ====
===== First leg =====
| 2 July 2015 | Skonto (Latvia) | 2–1 | (Republic of Ireland) St Patrick's Athletic | Riga, Latvia |
| 19:00 EET | Renārs Rode (yellow card) 28'; Edgars Jermolajevs (yellow card) 30'; Andrejs Kovalovs (yellow card) 36'; Artūrs Karašausks 38'; Ivan Murillo (yellow card) 52'; Vladislavs Gutkovskis 65'; Oļegs Timofejevs (yellow card) 84' | | Aaron Greene 21'; Greg Bolger (yellow card) 62'; James Chambers (yellow card) 64' | Stadium: Skonto Stadium; Attendance: 1,780; Referee: Fran Jovic (Croatia) |

===== Second leg =====
| 9 July 2015 | St Patrick's Athletic (Republic of Ireland) | 0–2 | (Latvia) Skonto | Dublin |
| 19:45 GMT | Ger O'Brien (yellow card) 14'; Kenny Browne (yellow card) 35'; Chris Forrester (yellow card) 54'; Killian Brennan (yellow card) 55' | | Andrejs Kovalovs (yellow card) 13'; Vladislavs Sorokins 37'; Artūrs Karašausks (yellow card) 54'; Artūrs Karašausks 59' (pen.) | Stadium: Richmond Park; Attendance: 2,354; Referee: Tomasz Musial (Poland) |

=== Leinster Senior Cup ===
Win Draw Loss

==== Fourth round ====
| 9 February 2015 | St Patrick's Athletic | 7–0 | Tolka Rovers | Inchicore, Dublin |
| 19:45 GMT | Conan Byrne 6'; Christy Fagan 58'; Alan McDermott (o.g.) 61'; Ian Bermingham 63'; Ciarán Kilduff 78'; Ciarán Kilduff 90+1'; Killian Brennan 90+5' | | | Stadium: Richmond Park; Attendance: 450 (Est.); Referee: Michael O'Connor |

==== Quarter-final ====
| 9 September 2015 | St Patrick's Athletic | 4–0 | Crumlin United | Inchicore, Dublin |
| 19:45 GMT | Jamie McGrath 15'; Morgan Langley 32'; Morgan Langley 50'; Jack Bayly 81' | | Robert Douglas (yellow card) 51'; Dean Hurley (yellow card) 80' | Stadium: Richmond Park; Attendance: 400 (Est.) |

==== Semi-final ====
| 22 September 2015 | St Patrick's Athletic | 0–1 | Dundalk | Inchicore, Dublin |
| 19:45 GMT | | | Stephen O'Donnell 51'; John Mountney (penalty missed) 59' | Stadium: Richmond Park; Attendance: 375 (Est.) |

=== President's Cup ===
Win Draw Loss

==== Final ====
| 28 February 2015 | Dundalk | 2–1 | St Patrick's Athletic | Dundalk, County Louth |
| 15:00 GMT | Daryl Horgan 36'; Richie Towell 37' | | Chris Forrester 35'; Greg Bolger (yellow card) 51'; James Chambers (yellow card) 75' | Stadium: Oriel Park; Attendance: 1,800 (Est.); Referee: Tomas Connoly |

=== Friendlies ===
Win Draw Loss

==== Preseason ====
| 13 February 2015 | Wexford Youths | 0–1 | St Patrick's Athletic | Crossabeg, County Wexford |
| 20:00 GMT | | | Killian Brennan 80' (pen.) | Stadium: Ferrycarraig Park; Attendance: 150 (Est.) |

| 16 February 2015 | St Patrick's Athletic | 6–0 | Cabinteely | Inchicore, Dublin |
| 19:45 GMT | James Chambers 32'; Killian Brennan 61'; Kenny Browne 63'; Killian Brennan 84' (pen.); Ciarán Kilduff 87'; Conor McCormack 89' | | | Stadium: Richmond Park; Attendance: 300 (Est.); Referee: Neil Doyle |

| 20 February 2015 | Shelbourne | 0–2 | St Patrick's Athletic | Drumcondra, Dublin |
| 20:00 GMT | Alan Kehoe (yellow card) 72' | | Christy Fagan (yellow card) 72'; Christy Fagan 77'; Ciarán Kilduff 80' | Stadium: Tolka Park; Attendance: 300 (Est.); Referee: Dave McKeown |

==== Mid-season ====
| 18 July 2015 | St Patrick's Athletic XI | 3–1 | St Patrick's Athletic Under 19s | Inchicore, Dublin |
| | Morgan Langley; Morgan Langley ??? | | ??? | Stadium: Richmond Park; Attendance: N/A |

| 25 July 2015 | St Patrick's Athletic XI | 3–4 | St Patrick's Athletic Under 19s | Inchicore, Dublin |
| | Conor McCormack; Morgan Langley; Cyril Guedjé | | ??? ??? ??? Conor Kane 90' | Stadium: Richmond Park; Attendance: N/A |

| 29 July 2015 | St Patrick's Athletic | 3–2 | Manchester City XI | Dublin |
| 19:45 GMT | Chris Forrester; Conan Byrne; Mikey Hannigan (yellow card); Conan Byrne | | George Glendon; David Faupala; Charlie Oliver (yellow card) | Stadium: Richmond Park; Attendance: 1,000 (Est.); Referee: Rob Harvey |
