= Delentz Pierre =

Haitian footballer (born 2000)

Personal information
- Date of birth: November 16, 2000 (age 25)
- Place of birth: Fort Lauderdale, Florida, United States
- Height: 6 ft 1 in (1.85 m)
- Position: Defender

Team information
- Current team: FC Tulsa
- Number: 4

Youth career
- 2015–2019: Real Salt Lake

College career
Years	Team	Apps	(Gls)
2019–2022	Portland Pilots	48	(4)

Senior career*
Years	Team	Apps	(Gls)
2019	Real Monarchs	4	(0)
2023–2024	Real Salt Lake	0	(0)
2023	Real Monarchs	14	(1)
2023	→ Colorado Springs Switchbacks (loan)	6	(0)
2024	→ Colorado Springs Switchbacks (loan)	20	(2)
2025–	FC Tulsa	47	(3)

International career
2018	Haiti U20	2	(1)
- * Club domestic league appearances and goals

Delentz Pierre (born November 16, 2000) is a footballer who plays as a defender for USL Championship club FC Tulsa. Born in the United States, he has represented Haiti at youth level.

== Career ==
Pierre has been part of the Real Salt Lake academy setup since 2015, and appeared for their USL Championship side Real Monarchs in 2019.

From late 2019, Pierre has committed to playing college soccer at the University of Portland.

Pierre helped Colorado Springs Switchbacks to a league title while on loan from Real Salt Lake during the 2024 USL Championship season.

In January 2025, Pierre signed with USL Championship side FC Tulsa.
