= Quenzi Huerman =

French footballer (born 2001)

Personal information
- Full name: Quentin Emeric Huerman
- Date of birth: 21 July 2001 (age 25)
- Place of birth: Vannes, France
- Height: 1.83 m (6 ft 0 in)
- Position: Forward

Team information
- Current team: Louisville City
- Number: 21

Youth career
- 2017–2019: Vannes

College career
Years	Team	Apps	(Gls)
2019–2021	Palm Beach Atlantic Sailfish	34	(6)
2022	Seton Hall Pirates	18	(7)
2023	North Carolina Tar Heels	20	(10)

Senior career*
Years	Team	Apps	(Gls)
2022–2023	Asheville City SC	21	(8)
2024–2025	Colorado Springs Switchbacks	47	(4)
2026–	Louisville City	18	(1)
- * Club domestic league appearances and goals as of 12:39, 8 November 2026 (UTC)

Quentin Emeric "Quenzi" Huerman (born 21 July 2001) is a French professional footballer who plays as a forward for Louisville City in the USL Championship.

== Career ==
=== Youth and college ===
Huerman spent two years with local side Vannes OC, also spending a year in the United States as an exchange student at Somerset High School in Kentucky, playing for the high school team, scoring 14 goals in seven appearances. In 2019, he attended Palm Beach Atlantic University to play college soccer, where he went on to score six goals and tally 12 assists in two seasons and was named Sunshine State Conference (SSC) Player of the Year, USC All-American, USC All-South Region, and D2CCA All-South Region. Huerman transferred to Seton Hall University in 2022, netting seven times in 18 games and was All-Big East Conference First Team. He spent his graduate seasons at University of North Carolina at Chapel Hill and earned All-Atlantic Coast Conference (ACC) First Team honors after scoring ten goals in 20 appearances for the Tar Heels.

Huerman also spent two seasons with USL League Two side Asheville City SC, netting nine times in 23 regular season and playoff fixtures across the 2022 and 2023 seasons. In 2023, he was named USL League Two South Central Divisional Player of the Year.

=== Professional ===
On 10 January 2024, it was announced Huerman would sign his first professional contract with USL Championship side Colorado Springs Switchbacks for the upcoming 2024 season. On 9 December 2025, it was announced Huerman would sign with USL Championship side Louisville City on a two-year deal.

== Honors ==
- NCAA Third-Team All-American: 2023
