= Aidan Rocha =

American soccer player (born 2000)

Personal information
- Date of birth: December 25, 2000 (age 25)
- Place of birth: Brookeville, Maryland, United States
- Height: 1.73 m (5 ft 8 in)
- Position: Midfielder

Team information
- Current team: Colorado Springs Switchbacks
- Number: 18

Youth career
- 2015–2019: Bethesda SC

College career
Years	Team	Apps	(Gls)
2019–2022	Georgetown Hoyas	69	(5)

Senior career*
Years	Team	Apps	(Gls)
2023	Loudoun United	33	(0)
2024–	Colorado Springs Switchbacks	71	(2)
- * Club domestic league appearances and goals as of November 7, 2026

Aidan Rocha (born December 25, 2000) is an American soccer player who plays as a midfielder for the USL Championship club Colorado Springs Switchbacks FC.

== Career ==
=== Youth ===
Rocha attended St. John's College High School. Rocha also played club soccer with Bethesda Soccer Club up until 2019, where he was a four-year starter serving as a captain his junior and senior year.

=== College ===
In 2019, Rocha attended Georgetown University to play college soccer. In four seasons with the Hoyas, Rocha made 69 appearances, scoring five goals and tallying six assists. During his time at college, Rocha was named the Big East Conference Midfielder of the Year and named First Team All-Big East. As a Freshman, Rocha scored the game winning penalty kick vs Virginia, to secure the Hoyas first National Championship in 2019.

=== Professional ===
In December 2022, Rocha entered the 2023 MLS SuperDraft as one of the 367 eligible players. On December 21, 2022, Rocha was drafted 60th overall by D.C. United Rocha signed with USL Championship club Loudoun United on March 10, 2023. He made his professional debut the following day, starting in a 3–1 away victory over Memphis 901.

Rocha joined Colorado Springs Switchbacks in December 2023.
