= Yosuke Hanya =

Japanese footballer (born 1999)

Personal information
- Full name: Yosuke Hanya
- Date of birth: January 30, 1999 (age 27)
- Place of birth: Tokyo, Japan
- Height: 1.73 m (5 ft 8 in)
- Position: Midfielder

Team information
- Current team: Colorado Springs Switchbacks (on loan from Colorado Rapids 2)
- Number: 20

Youth career
- FC Harue
- –2016: FC Tokyo

College career
| Years | Team | Apps | (Gls) |
| 2017 | Tokyo Gakugei University | ? | (?) |
| 2018–2021 | UMass Minutemen | 35 | (2) |

Senior career*
| Years | Team | Apps | (Gls) |
| 2016 | FC Tokyo U-23 | 3 | (0) |
| 2022– | Colorado Rapids 2 | 33 | (13) |
| 2023 | → Colorado Rapids (loan) | 2 | (0) |
| 2024–2025 | → Colorado Springs Switchbacks (loan) | 61 | (6) |
| 2026– | Colorado Springs Switchbacks | 16 | (1) |
- * Club domestic league appearances and goals as of 19:51, 8 November 2026 (UTC)

Yosuke Hanya (半谷 陽介, Hanya Yōsuke; born on January 30, 1999) is a Japanese professional footballer who plays as a midfielder for MLS Next Pro club Colorado Rapids 2.

== Career ==
Yosuke Hanya joined FC Tokyo in 2016. On July 31, he debuted in J3 League (vs Gainare Tottori). He then left to study and play soccer at the University of Massachusetts Amherst. Hanya spent three seasons playing for UMass, totaling two goals and 17 assists during his collegiate career.

In February 2022, Hanya joined Colorado Rapids 2 ahead of their first season in MLS Next Pro.

In May 2023, Hanya was called up to the Colorado Rapids from Colorado Rapids 2 on a Short-Term Agreement.

On May 17, 2023, Hanya made his MLS debut for the Colorado Rapids in a game against Atlanta United FC. Hanya subbed into the game in the 88th minute.

At the end of November of 2025, his loan had ended with Switchbacks and returned to Colorado Rapids 2.

On December 11, 2025, the Colorado Springs Switchbacks FC had signed Hanya to a multi-year deal, after being on loan for 2 years.
