= Juan Tejada =

Panamanian footballer (born 1997)

Personal information
- Full name: Juan David Tejada Londono
- Date of birth: January 14, 1997 (age 29)
- Place of birth: Panama City, Panama
- Height: 1.70 m (5 ft 7 in)
- Position: Forward

Team information
- Current team: Colorado Springs Switchbacks
- Number: 27

Youth career
- Chepo
- 2014–2015: IMG Academy

College career
Years	Team	Apps	(Gls)
2015–2018	Eckerd Tritons	60	(23)

Senior career*
Years	Team	Apps	(Gls)
2017–2018	Lakeland Tropics	24	(12)
2019–2022	Tampa Bay Rowdies	68	(13)
2022–2023	Indy Eleven	28	(2)
2023–	Colorado Springs Switchbacks	108	(15)

International career^{‡}
- Panama U-17
- Panama U-20
- Panama U-23
2020–	Panama	1	(0)
- * Club domestic league appearances and goals as of 7 November 2026 ‡ National team caps and goals as of 18 July 2019

Juan David Tejada Londono (born 14 January 1997) is a Panamanian footballer who plays as a forward for Colorado Springs Switchbacks in the USL Championship.

== Career ==
=== Youth and college ===
Tejada played with the youth academy of Chepo F.C. in his native Panama starting from U–15 before moving to the United States on a scholarship to play for IMG Academy in Bradenton, Florida.

After graduating from IMG, Tejada began playing collegiately for the Eckerd Tritons in St. Petersburg, Florida. During his time at Eckerd, Tejada started every game for the Tritons all four years he played there.

== Club ==
=== Lakeland Tropics ===
Tejada played in the USL PDL in 2017 and 2018, starring as an attacking midfielder or forward for the Lakeland Tropics. In 2018, while playing alongside some of the Tropics' MASL professionals, Tejada led the team in scoring with 7 goals in 11 appearances.

=== Tampa Bay Rowdies ===
In early 2019, Tejada joined the local Tampa Bay Rowdies as a preseason trialist. He scored in a closed–door friendly against the UCF Knights and impressed coaches and fans alike with his work rate against Major League Soccer's D.C. United before being rewarded with a professional contract on February 20. Tejada added a second preseason tally against the Georgia Southern Eagles and then started for the Rowdies in the opening match of the 2019 USL Championship season. Tejada scored 14 goals in 75 appearances during his time with the Rowdies.

=== Indy Eleven ===
On July 21, 2022, Tejada was traded by Tampa Bay to Indy Eleven in exchange for midfielder Nicky Law.

=== Colorado Springs Switchbacks FC ===
On June 14, 2023, Tejada transferred to USL Championship Western Conference club Colorado Springs Switchbacks.

== International ==
Tejada played at several junior levels for Panama. He was called up to the senior team in November 2020 for friendlies scheduled to take place in Europe. He subsequently made his debut against the US national team, playing the first half of a 6-2 loss on November 16.

== Honours ==
Tampa Bay Rowdies

- USL Championship Regular Season Title: 2021
