= James Chambers (Irish footballer) =

Irish footballer (born 1987)

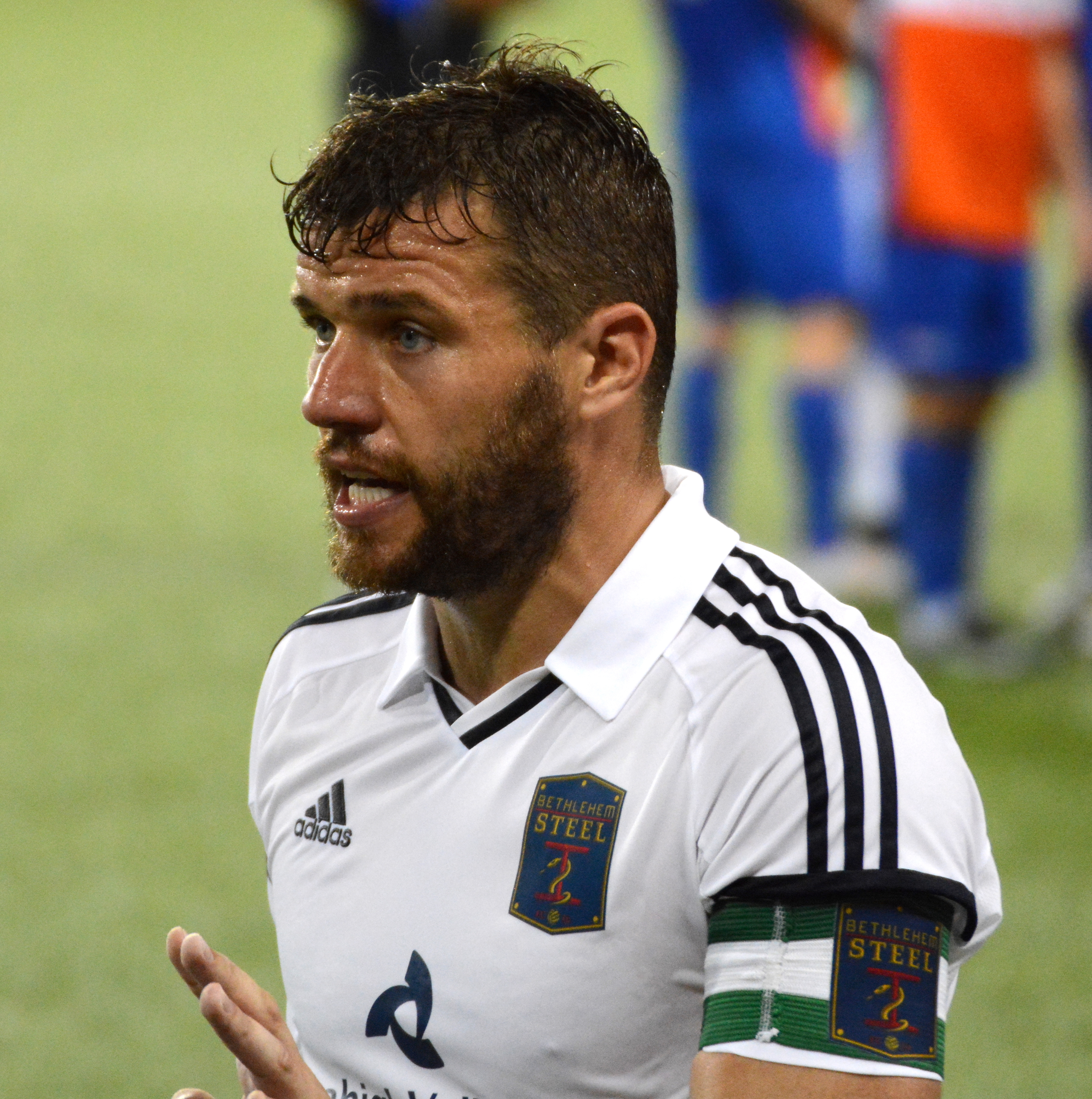
- Chambers playing for Bethlehem Steel in 2017

Personal information
- Full name: James Chambers
- Date of birth: 14 February 1987 (age 39)
- Place of birth: Dublin, Ireland
- Position: Midfielder

Youth career
- 1999–2004: Shelbourne

Senior career*
Years	Team	Apps	(Gls)
2004–2008	Shelbourne	68	(7)
2006	→ Waterford United (loan)	24	(0)
2009	Solihull Moors	1	(0)
2009	Drogheda United	33	(8)
2010	Shamrock Rovers	31	(6)
2011	Hamilton Academical	19	(2)
2012	St Patrick's Athletic	26	(1)
2013	Shamrock Rovers	31	(3)
2014–2015	St Patrick's Athletic	57	(6)
2016–2019	Bethlehem Steel	116	(18)

International career
2007	Republic of Ireland U21	3	(0)
2010	Republic of Ireland U23	1	(0)

Managerial career
- 2020: Philadelphia Union (academy)
- 2021–2023: Colorado Springs Switchbacks (assistant)
- 2024–2025: Colorado Springs Switchbacks
- * Club domestic league appearances and goals

James Chambers (born 14 February 1987) is an Irish coach and former professional footballer who was most recently the head coach of USL Championship club Colorado Springs Switchbacks.

Chambers played for Shelbourne, Waterford United, Drogheda United, Shamrock Rovers and St Patrick's Athletic in Ireland, Solihull Moors in England, Hamilton Academical in Scotland and Bethlehem Steel in the United States.

== Club career ==
=== Shelbourne ===
Chambers signed for Shelbourne at 11 years of age. He started out with the schoolboy teams and made his breakthrough into the first team during the 2004 season, at the age of 17, including being part of the Shelbourne squad during their successful 2004 European campaign. He did not make his first official first team appearance for Shelbourne until 15 August 2005 when he made his League of Ireland debut coming on as a 2nd half substitute during a 1–0 defeat to Cork City at Turner's Cross. To aid Chambers with his development and to gain valuable experience, he was loaned out to Waterford United for the 2006 season and instantly became a regular in their starting XI.

Chambers returned to Shelbourne for the 2007 season, but he was entering upon a very unfamiliar environment at Tolka Park. Shelbourne were now in financial meltdown and were uncertain over their participation for the 2007 season. After the club was relegated to the First Division, he made the decision to stay at Shels despite their relegation and keen interest in him from numerous Premier Division clubs. As only one of two first team players retained by Shelbourne for the 2007 season, Chambers' talents were now of great importance to Shelbourne and he became one of the first names on the Shels teamsheet due to many impressive performances. He scored his first senior goal for Shelbourne with a delightful equaliser in a 1–1 draw with Monaghan United at Tolka Park on 13 April 2007. Chambers departed Shelbourne after 10 years at the end of the 2008 season to move to Britain. He made a total of 73 league and cup appearances for Shelbourne scoring 8 times.

=== Solihull Moors ===
He went on trial at Walsall, but was ineligible to play matches, so he joined Conference North side Solihull Moors on 16 January 2009 to get game time. Chambers' stay at Solihull Moors would be brief as he returned to Ireland in March 2009 to join Drogheda United.

=== Drogheda United ===
He made his competitive Drogheda debut on 13 March 2009 in 0–0 draw against Bray Wanderers at United Park. Chambers went on an amazing scoring streak in the 2009 season. He scored nine goals, including the all-important opener against Bray Wanderers in the relegation play-off, a match which finished 2–0 to Drogheda United.

=== Shamrock Rovers ===
Following his impressive season at Drogheda United, Chambers joined Shamrock Rovers in November 2009. In his first season with 'The Hoops', Chambers scored an impressive 11 league goals and won his first League of Ireland winners medal after Shamrock Rovers won the 2010 Premier Division on the final night of the season.

=== Hamilton Academical ===
He moved to Scottish Premier League team Hamilton Academical on 25 January 2011. Chambers showed spells of his League of Ireland form whilst playing in the SPL but Hamilton were relegated into the First Division, and he left the club after a year.

=== St Patrick's Athletic ===
Chambers was signed by Liam Buckley for St Patrick's Athletic in January 2012. Chambers impressed the Pats fans with his superb passing and found himself playing in a midfield role that saw him be the key to his sides attacks beginning. He picked up the RTÉ man of the match award for his brilliant display including the assist for the opening goal by Chris Forrester against his old club and Dublin rivals Shamrock Rovers after the Saints ran riot and won 5–1 in a famous night. Chambers set up Chris Fagan's opener against U.C.D after an excellent slipped ball through the defence. Unfortunately Chambers' excellent form for Pats was interrupted for 2 months after he picked up an injury away to Sligo Rovers. Chambers returned from the bench against Bohemians in fine form and changes the game for Pats to win 2–1. Chambers played in all of the Saints games of their Europa League campaign, where they knocked out Íþróttabandalag Vestmannaeyja from Iceland and NK Široki Brijeg from Bosnia and Herzegovina before being knocked out by German giants Hannover 96 in front of 25,000 people at the AWD-Arena. He played in the 2012 FAI Cup final at the Aviva Stadium, as Pats lost 3–2 after extra time to Derry City. Chambers was voted into the 2012 PFAI Team of the Year by his fellow League of Ireland players, for an excellent season.

=== Return to Shamrock Rovers ===
Chambers signed again for The Hoops in November 2012. He won the 2013 League Cup, the 2013 Setanta Cup and the 2013 Leinster Senior Cup (scoring in a 1–0 win over St Pat's in the final), however the season was overall a disappointing one for Chambers as Rovers finished fifth, with his old side Pats winning the league, and he left at the end of the season.

=== Return to St Patrick's Athletic ===
Chambers signed back for champions St Patrick's Athletic for the 2014 season. Week after week he impressed fans, putting in a string of man of the match performances week in week out and retained his place in the midfield for most of the season amidst competition for places from Keith Fahey, Killian Brennan, Greg Bolger and Lee Lynch. The Saints disappointingly only finished third in the league but the season remained a success with third place earning a Europa League spot for next season, winning the 2014 President of Ireland's Cup, the 2014 Leinster Senior Cup and most impressively, winning the 2014 FAI Cup to end a 53-year drought for the club since last winning the competition. He signed a new contract for the 2015 season in January 2015. On 19 September 2015, Pats won the 2015 League of Ireland Cup against Galway United, with Chambers scoring his penalty in a penalty shoot-out win after a 0–0 draw at Eamonn Deacy Park. Chambers had a very impressive season individually in a poor season for the team. He scored 5 goals in all competitions, 3 of them coming direct from freekicks. He was voted at the St Patrick's Athletic Player of the season for 2015 by the club's supporters for his excellent performances. Chambers was also voted into the PFAI Team of the Year by his fellow League of Ireland players.

=== Bethlehem Steel ===
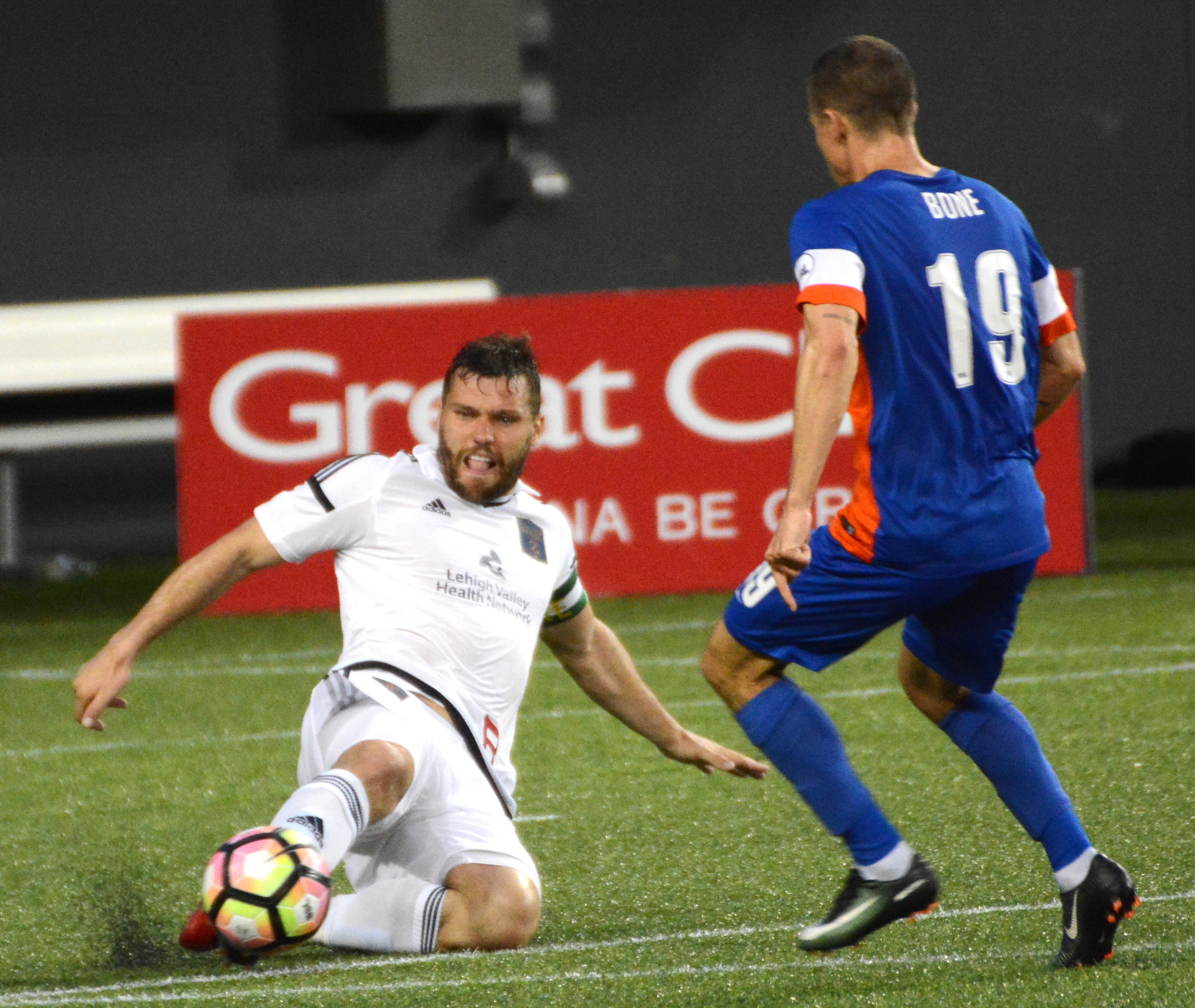
Chambers defending against FC Cincinnati midfielder Corben Bone during a 2017 match

Chambers signed for Bethlehem Steel of the United Soccer League on 28 January 2016.

Chambers retired after the end of the club's 2019 season.

== International career ==
On 24 February 2007, Chambers received a call up to the Republic of Ireland under-21 squad by manager Don Givens. He made his debut for the under-21s at the Madeira tournament in Portugal in February 2007. He made 3 appearances for the Irish side in the tournament. In May 2010, Chambers made his Republic of Ireland under 23 debut against England C in the 2009–11 International Challenge Trophy at the Waterford Regional Sports Centre.

== Coaching career ==
=== Colorado Springs Switchbacks ===
After serving as an academy coach for Philadelphia Union following his retirement, Chambers was appointed as an assistant coach by Colorado Springs Switchbacks in the USL Championship in 2021.

He spent three seasons in the position, before being promoted to head coach of the same club on 5 January 2024. Throughout the 2024 season, Chambers led the Switchbacks to reach the playoffs, where the team conceded only one goal, eventually winning the Western Conference title, and then their first USL Championship title, following a 3–0 victory over Rhode Island FC in the league final. In November 2025, it was announced that the club had parted ways with Chambers, along with Sporting Director Stephen Hogan also.

== Career statistics ==
=== Playing career ===
As of 18 February 2020

Appearances and goals by club, season and competition
Club	Season	League			National Cup (Note: Includes FAI Cup, FA Cup, Scottish Cup)		League Cup (Note: Includes League of Ireland Cup, Conference League Cup, Scottish League Cup)		Continental		Other		Total	
Club	Season	Division	Apps	Goals	Apps	Goals	Apps	Goals	Apps	Goals	Apps	Goals	Apps	Goals
Shelbourne	2005	League of Ireland Premier Division	3	0	0	0	0	0	0 (Note: Appearances in UEFA Champions League)	0	0 (Note: Appearances in Setanta Sports Cup)	0	3	0
Waterford United (loan)	2006	League of Ireland Premier Division	24	0	3	0	0	0	—		2 (Note: Appearances in Relegation play-offs)	0	29	0
Shelbourne	2007	League of Ireland First Division	32	7	1	0	1	0	—		—		34	7
Shelbourne	2008	League of Ireland First Division	33	0	1	0	2	1	—		—		36	1
Shelbourne	Shelbourne Total		68	7	2	0	3	1	0	0	0	0	73	8
Solihull Moors	2008–09	National League North	1	0	0	0	0	0	—		0 (Note: Appearances in FA Trophy)	0	1	0
Drogheda United	2009	League of Ireland Premier Division	33	7	2	0	2	1	—		1 (Note: Appearances in Relegation play-offs)	1	38	9
Shamrock Rovers	2010	League of Ireland Premier Division	31	6	5	4	2	0	4 (Note: Appearances in UEFA Europa League)	0	1 (Note: Appearances in Leinster Senior Cup)	0	43	10
Hamilton Academical	2010–11	Scottish Premier League	9	1	0	0	0	0	—		—		9	1
Hamilton Academical	2011–12	Scottish Championship	10	1	0	0	1	1	—		4 (Note: Appearances in Scottish Challenge Cup)	1	15	3
Hamilton Academical	Hamilton Academical Total		19	2	0	0	1	1	—		4	1	24	4
St Patrick's Athletic	2012	League of Ireland Premier Division	26	1	4	0	1	0	6	0	2	0	39	1
Shamrock Rovers	2013	League of Ireland Premier Division	31	3	2	0	2	0	—		10 (Note: 7 appearances, 1 goal in Setanta Sports Cup & 3 appearances, 1 goal in Leinster Senior Cup)	2	45	5
Shamrock Rovers	Shamrock Rovers Total		62	9	7	4	4	0	4	0	11	2	88	15
St Patrick's Athletic	2014	League of Ireland Premier Division	25	1	4	0	0	0	1	0	7 (Note: 3 appearances in Setanta Sports Cup & 4 appearances in Leinster Senior Cup)	0	37	1
St Patrick's Athletic	2015	League of Ireland Premier Division	32	4	2	0	4	1	1	0	3 (Note: 1 appearance in President's Cup & 2 appearances in Leinster Senior Cup)	0	42	5
St Patrick's Athletic	St Patrick's Athletic Total		83	6	10	0	5	1	8	0	12	0	118	7
Bethlehem Steel	2016	USL Championship Eastern Conference	27	3	—		—		—		—		27	3
Bethlehem Steel	2017	USL Championship Eastern Conference	28	5	—		—		—		—		28	5
Bethlehem Steel	2018	USL Championship Eastern Conference	29	5	—		—		—		—		29	5
Bethlehem Steel	2019	USL Championship Eastern Conference	32	5	—		—		—		—		32	5
Bethlehem Steel	Bethlehem Steel Total		116	18	—		—		—		—		116	18
Career Total			406	50	24	4	15	4	12	0	29	3	486	61

=== Managerial career ===
As of match played 2 November 2025

Managerial record by team and tenure
Team	From	To	Record							
Team	From	To	G	W	D	L	GF	GA	GD	Win %
(United States) Colorado Springs Switchbacks	5 January 2024	4 November 2025	75	32	14	29	103	99	+4	42.67
Total			75	32	14	29	103	99	+4	42.67

== Honours ==
=== Playing career ===
==== Club ====
Shamrock Rovers

- League of Ireland Premier Division: 2010
- League of Ireland Cup: 2013
- Setanta Sports Cup: 2013
- Leinster Senior Cup: 2013

St Patrick's Athletic

- FAI Cup: 2014
- President of Ireland's Cup: 2014
- Leinster Senior Cup: 2014
- League of Ireland Cup: 2015

Individual

- PFAI Premier Division Team of the Year: 2012, 2015
- St Patrick's Athletic Player of the Year: 2015

=== Managerial career ===
Colorado Springs Switchbacks

- USL Championship final: 2024
- USL Championship Western Conference title: 2024
