= 2025 League of Ireland play-offs =

League of Ireland play-offs
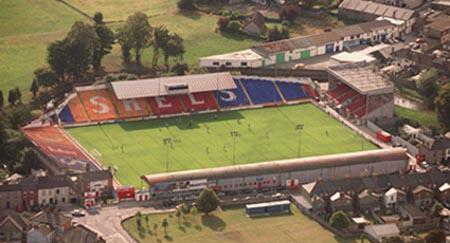
- Tolka Park which was the venue for the play-off final
- Season: 2025
- Semi-finals (Eliminated): Cobh Ramblers, UCD
- Final (Eliminated): Treaty United
- Promotion/Relegation (Eliminated): Bray Wnaderers
- Promotion/Relegation (Winners): Waterford

The League of Ireland play-offs for the 2025 season were held in October and November 2025 with the promotion/relegation play-off staged at Tolka Park in Dublin.

The play-offs began with two semi-finals which were played over two legs. The teams who finished in 2nd to 5th place in the First Division competed. The winners of the semi-finals advanced to the finals, with the finals winners going on to face the team that finished 9th in the Premier Division for a spot in the Premier Division. Waterford defeated Bray Wnaderers in the final game to retain their Premier Division status for 2026.

== Semi-finals ==
=== Background ===
==== League table ====
Pos	Team	Pld	W	D	L	GF	GA	GD	Pts	Promotion or qualification
1	Dundalk	36	23	10	3	74	31	+43	79	Promotion to 2026 League of Ireland Premier Division
2	Cobh Ramblers	36	21	6	9	70	38	+32	69	Qualification for First Division play-offs
3	Bray Wanderers	36	20	2	14	63	53	+10	62	Qualification for First Division play-offs
4	UCD	36	17	8	11	50	40	+10	59	Qualification for First Division play-offs
5	Treaty United	36	13	9	14	51	48	+3	48	Qualification for First Division play-offs
6	Longford Town	36	12	9	15	43	59	−16	45	
7	Wexford	36	12	8	16	42	51	−9	44	

Source: SSE Airtricity League of Ireland First Division
Rules for classification: 1) Points; 2) Goal difference; 3) Goals scored

=== Cobh Ramblers vs Treaty United ===
==== First leg ====
24 October 2025
19:45 IST

Treaty United	1–0	Cobh Ramblers
Hanson 77'	Report

Markets Field, Limerick
Attendance: 1,849
Referee: Oliver Moran

Treaty United	Cobh Ramblers

GK	1	(Republic of Ireland) Corey Chambers
DF	2	(Republic of Ireland) Richkov Boevi
DF	3	(Republic of Ireland) Ben Lynch
DF	20	(Republic of Ireland) Evan O'Connor	(yellow card) 80'
DF	33	(Republic of Ireland) Eoin Martin
MF	5	(Republic of Ireland) Lee Devitt
MF	7	(Republic of Ireland) Lee Lynch (c)		(substituted off) 89'
MF	8	(Republic of Ireland) Colin Conroy	(yellow card) 35'
MF	11	(Republic of Ireland) Mark Byrne
MF	34	(Republic of Ireland) Karl O'Sullivan
FW	9	(Republic of Ireland) Patrick Ferry		(substituted off) 60'
Substitutes:
GK	32	(England) Matt Boylan
DF	23	(Republic of Ireland) Fionn Doherty
DF	27	(Republic of Ireland) Robbie Lynch
DF	31	(Republic of Ireland) Chris Horgan
MF	6	(Republic of Ireland) Steven Healy
MF	16	(Canada) Joe Hanson		(substituted on) 60'
MF	18	(Canada) Connor Wilson
MF	24	(Canada) Benjamin Lee		(substituted on) 89'
FW	26	(Republic of Ireland) Roy Lawlor
Manager:
(Republic of Ireland) Tommy Barrett

GK	16	(Luxembourg) Timothy Martin
DF	2	(Wales) Iestyn Hughes
DF	4	(Republic of Ireland) Niall O'Keefe
DF	6	(Republic of Ireland) Shane Griffin (c)
DF	18	(Finland) Jonas Häkkinen
MF	7	(Republic of Ireland) Cian Bargary
MF	8	(Republic of Ireland) Barry Coffey
MF	11	(Scotland) Rhys Gourdie		(substituted off) 83'
MF	14	(Republic of Ireland) Cian Coleman
MF	19	(Republic of Ireland) Dylan McGlade		(substituted off) 72'
FW	9	(Republic of Ireland) Cian Murphy	(yellow card) 85'
Substitutes:
GK	1	(Republic of Ireland) Oisín Barry
DF	3	(Republic of Ireland) John O'Donovan
DF	12	(United States) Nolan Evers
DF	15	(Republic of Ireland) Lucas Curtin
MF	22	(Republic of Ireland) Mikey Carroll
MF	27	(England) Harvey Cribb
FW	24	(Republic of Ireland) Evan Deasy
FW	45	(England) Sam Bellis		(substituted on) 72'
FW	88	(Republic of Ireland) Matthew Whelan		(substituted on) 83'
Manager:
(Republic of Ireland) Richie Holland (Note: Holland was filling in as interim, after Michael McDermott departed the club before the play-offs began)

==== Second leg ====
28 October 2025
19:45 IST

Cobh Ramblers	1–1	Treaty United
Whelan 90+4'	Report	Martin 105+1'

St Colman's Park, Cobh
Attendance: 1,636
Referee: Mark Houlihan

Cobh Ramblers	Treaty United

GK	16	(Luxembourg) Timothy Martin
DF	2	(Wales) Iestyn Hughes		(substituted off) 63'
DF	4	(Republic of Ireland) Niall O'Keefe		(substituted off) 73'
DF	6	(Republic of Ireland) Shane Griffin (c)
DF	18	(Finland) Jonas Häkkinen
MF	7	(Republic of Ireland) Cian Bargary		(substituted off) 73'
MF	8	(Republic of Ireland) Barry Coffey
MF	14	(Republic of Ireland) Cian Coleman		(substituted off) 37'
MF	19	(Republic of Ireland) Dylan McGlade
MF	27	(England) Harvey Cribb		(substituted off) 45'
FW	9	(Republic of Ireland) Cian Murphy	(yellow card) 50'
Substitutes:
GK	1	(Republic of Ireland) Oisín Barry
DF	3	(Republic of Ireland) John O'Donovan		(substituted on) 37'
DF	12	(United States) Nolan Evers		(substituted on) 90'
MF	11	(Scotland) Rhys Gourdie		(substituted on) 45'
MF	22	(Republic of Ireland) Mikey Carroll
MF	23	(Republic of Ireland) Shane Griffin	(substituted on) 73'	(substituted off) 90'
MF	39	(Republic of Ireland) Jason Abbott
FW	45	(England) Sam Bellis		(substituted on) 63'
FW	88	(Republic of Ireland) Matthew Whelan		(substituted on) 73'
Manager:
(Republic of Ireland) Richie Holland

GK	1	(Republic of Ireland) Corey Chambers
DF	2	(Republic of Ireland) Richkov Boevi
DF	3	(Republic of Ireland) Ben Lynch	(yellow card) 86'
DF	20	(Republic of Ireland) Evan O'Connor
DF	33	(Republic of Ireland) Eoin Martin
MF	5	(Republic of Ireland) Lee Devitt
MF	7	(Republic of Ireland) Lee Lynch (c)	(yellow card) 104'	(substituted off) 77'
MF	8	(Republic of Ireland) Colin Conroy		(substituted off) 90'
MF	11	(Republic of Ireland) Mark Byrne	(yellow card) 81'	(substituted off) 90'
MF	34	(Republic of Ireland) Karl O'Sullivan
FW	16	(Canada) Joe Hanson		(substituted off) 70'
Substitutes:
GK	32	(England) Matt Boylan
DF	23	(Republic of Ireland) Fionn Doherty		(substituted on) 70'
DF	25	(Republic of Ireland) Mark Walsh
DF	27	(Republic of Ireland) Robbie Lynch
MF	6	(Republic of Ireland) Steven Healy	(yellow card) 109'	(substituted on) 90'
MF	12	(Republic of Ireland) Niko Kozlowski
MF	18	(Canada) Connor Wilson
MF	24	(Canada) Benjamin Lee		(substituted on) 77'
FW	26	(Republic of Ireland) Roy Lawlor		(substituted on) 90'
Manager:
(Republic of Ireland) Tommy Barrett

Treaty United won 2−1 on aggregate.

=== Bray Wanderers vs UCD ===
==== First leg ====
24 October 2025
19:45 IST

UCD	0−1	Bray Wanderers
	Report	Doyle 90+4'

UCD Bowl, Dublin
Attendance: 927
Referee: Lucas Keating

UCD	Bray Wanderers

GK	28	(Republic of Ireland) Noah Douglas
DF	3	(Republic of Ireland) Adam Wells
DF	4	(Republic of Ireland) Éanna Clancy (c)	(yellow card) 84'
DF	6	(Republic of Ireland) Declan Osagie
DF	10	(Republic of Ireland) Ciaran Behan	(yellow card) 80'
MF	7	(Republic of Ireland) Mikey McCullagh		(substituted off) 56'
MF	11	(Republic of Ireland) Brian McManus	(yellow card) 43'	(substituted off) 45'
MF	24	(Republic of Ireland) Adam Verdon	(yellow card) 90+2'
MF	34	(Republic of Ireland) Adam Brennan
FW	29	(Republic of Ireland) Jake Doyle		(substituted off) 89'
FW	40	(Republic of Ireland) Hugh Smith		(substituted off) 56'
Substitutes:
GK	20	(Republic of Ireland) Karl Andrade
DF	5	(Republic of Ireland) Carl Lennox		(substituted on) 45'
DF	18	(Republic of Ireland) Niall Holohan
MF	8	(Republic of Ireland) Ronan Finn		(substituted on) 56'
MF	19	(Republic of Ireland) Colin Bolton
MF	39	(Republic of Ireland) Louis Dignam		(substituted on) 89'
FW	9	(Republic of Ireland) Mikey Ragett
FW	12	(Republic of Ireland) Matthew Alonge
FW	17	(Republic of Ireland) Killian Cailloce		(substituted on) 56'
Manager:
(Republic of Ireland) William O'Connor

GK	1	(Republic of Ireland) Jimmy Corcoran
DF	2	(Republic of Ireland) Max Murphy	(yellow card) 84'
DF	4	(Republic of Ireland) Kilian Cantwell (c)
DF	6	(Republic of Ireland) Harvey Warren
DF	14	(Republic of Ireland) Cian Curtis		(substituted off) 87'
DF	20	(Republic of Ireland) Alain Kizenga	(yellow card) 40'
MF	8	(Republic of Ireland) Rhys Bartley	(yellow card) 75'
MF	10	(Spain) Guillermo Almirall		(substituted off) 64'
MF	11	(Republic of Ireland) Justin Ferizaj
MF	17	(Republic of Ireland) Cian Doyle	(yellow card) 83'
FW	21	(Republic of Ireland) Rhys Knight		(substituted off) 74'
Substitutes:
GK	25	(Republic of Ireland) Stephen McGuinness
DF	12	(Republic of Ireland) Jamie Duggan
DF	16	(Republic of Ireland) Paul Murphy
DF	30	(Republic of Ireland) Benjamin Fagbemi
MF	7	(Republic of Ireland) Conor Knight		(substituted on) 64'
MF	27	(Republic of Ireland) Sean Brennan		(substituted on) 71'
MF	32	(Republic of Ireland) Richard Ferizaj		(substituted on) 87'
FW	33	(Republic of Ireland) Cristiano Bramley
FW	34	(Republic of Ireland) Matthew Britton
Manager:
(Republic of Ireland) Paul Heffernan

==== Second leg ====
28 October 2025
19:45 IST

Bray Wanderers	3−2	UCD
Cantwell 4'; Curtis 61'; R. Ferizaj 90+3'	Report	Doyle 90+4'

Carlisle Grounds, Bray
Attendance: 2,030
Referee: Daniel Murphy

Bray Wanderers	UCD

GK	1	(Republic of Ireland) Jimmy Corcoran
DF	2	(Republic of Ireland) Max Murphy
DF	4	(Republic of Ireland) Kilian Cantwell (c)
DF	6	(Republic of Ireland) Harvey Warren
DF	14	(Republic of Ireland) Cian Curtis	(yellow card) 11'	(substituted off) 85'
DF	20	(Republic of Ireland) Alain Kizenga		(substituted off) 66'
MF	7	(Republic of Ireland) Conor Knight		(substituted off) 85'
MF	8	(Republic of Ireland) Rhys Bartley
MF	11	(Republic of Ireland) Justin Ferizaj
MF	17	(Republic of Ireland) Cian Doyle
FW	21	(Republic of Ireland) Rhys Knight		(substituted off) 57'
Substitutes:
GK	25	(Republic of Ireland) Stephen McGuinness
DF	12	(Republic of Ireland) Jamie Duggan		(substituted on) 66'
DF	16	(Republic of Ireland) Paul Murphy		(substituted on) 85'
DF	30	(Republic of Ireland) Benjamin Fagbemi
MF	27	(Republic of Ireland) Sean Brennan		(substituted on) 57'
MF	32	(Republic of Ireland) Richard Ferizaj		(substituted on) 85'
FW	29	(Republic of Ireland) Leon Keogh
FW	33	(Republic of Ireland) Cristiano Bramley
FW	34	(Republic of Ireland) Matthew Britton
Manager:
(Republic of Ireland) Paul Heffernan

GK	16	(Republic of Ireland) Dara Kavanagh
DF	3	(Republic of Ireland) Adam Wells
DF	4	(Republic of Ireland) Éanna Clancy
DF	10	(Republic of Ireland) Ciaran Behan	(yellow card) 56'
DF	18	(Republic of Ireland) Niall Holohan		(substituted off) 75'
MF	7	(Republic of Ireland) Mikey McCullagh		(substituted off) 66'
MF	8	(Republic of Ireland) Ronan Finn (c)
MF	11	(Republic of Ireland) Brian McManus	(yellow card) 41'
MF	24	(Republic of Ireland) Adam Verdon		(substituted off) 66'
MF	34	(Republic of Ireland) Adam Brennan		(substituted off) 90'
FW	29	(Republic of Ireland) Jake Doyle
Substitutes:
GK	28	(Republic of Ireland) Noah Douglas
DF	5	(Republic of Ireland) Carl Lennox
DF	6	(Republic of Ireland) Declan Osagie
MF	26	(Republic of Ireland) Luke O'Regan
MF	39	(Republic of Ireland) Louis Dignam		(substituted on) 66'
FW	9	(Republic of Ireland) Mikey Ragett		(substituted on) 90'
FW	12	(Republic of Ireland) Matthew Alonge
FW	17	(Republic of Ireland) Killian Cailloce		(substituted on) 75'
FW	40	(Republic of Ireland) Hugh Smith		(substituted on) 66'
Manager:
(Republic of Ireland) William O'Connor

Bray Wanderers won 4−2 on aggregate.

== Final ==
=== Details ===
2 November 2025
15:00 IST

Bray Wanderers	1−0	Treaty United
J. Ferizaj 90'	Report

Athlone Town Stadium, Athlone
Attendance: 1,869
Referee: Declan Toland

Bray Wanderers	Treaty United

GK	1	(Republic of Ireland) Jimmy Corcoran
DF	2	(Republic of Ireland) Max Murphy
DF	4	(Republic of Ireland) Kilian Cantwell (c)
DF	6	(Republic of Ireland) Harvey Warren
DF	14	(Republic of Ireland) Cian Curtis
DF	20	(Republic of Ireland) Alain Kizenga
MF	7	(Republic of Ireland) Conor Knight		(substituted off) 69'
MF	8	(Republic of Ireland) Rhys Bartley		(substituted off) 69'
MF	11	(Republic of Ireland) Justin Ferizaj	(yellow card) 90'
MF	27	(Republic of Ireland) Sean Brennan		(substituted off) 90'
FW	17	(Republic of Ireland) Cian Doyle	(yellow card) 61'
Substitutes:
GK	25	(Republic of Ireland) Stephen McGuinness
DF	12	(Republic of Ireland) Jamie Duggan
DF	16	(Republic of Ireland) Paul Murphy		(substituted on) 90'
DF	30	(Republic of Ireland) Benjamin Fagbemi
FW	10	(Spain) Guillermo Almirall		(substituted on) 69'
MF	32	(Republic of Ireland) Richard Ferizaj
FW	21	(Republic of Ireland) Rhys Knight		(substituted on) 69'
FW	33	(Republic of Ireland) Cristiano Bramley
FW	34	(Republic of Ireland) Matthew Britton
Manager:
(Republic of Ireland) Paul Heffernan

GK	1	(Republic of Ireland) Corey Chambers
DF	2	(Republic of Ireland) Richkov Boevi
DF	3	(Republic of Ireland) Ben Lynch	(yellow card) 36'
DF	20	(Republic of Ireland) Evan O'Connor	(yellow card) 49'
DF	33	(Republic of Ireland) Eoin Martin
MF	5	(Republic of Ireland) Lee Devitt
MF	7	(Republic of Ireland) Lee Lynch (c)		(substituted off) 89'
MF	8	(Republic of Ireland) Colin Conroy	(yellow card) 90'
MF	11	(Republic of Ireland) Mark Byrne		(substituted off) 89'
MF	34	(Republic of Ireland) Karl O'Sullivan
FW	9	(Republic of Ireland) Patrick Ferry		(substituted off) 62'
Substitutes:
GK	32	(England) Matt Boylan
DF	23	(Republic of Ireland) Fionn Doherty
DF	25	(Republic of Ireland) Mark Walsh
DF	27	(Republic of Ireland) Robbie Lynch
MF	6	(Republic of Ireland) Steven Healy
MF	18	(Canada) Connor Wilson
MF	24	(Canada) Benjamin Lee		(substituted on) 89'
FW	16	(Canada) Joe Hanson		(substituted on) 62'
FW	26	(Republic of Ireland) Roy Lawlor		(substituted on) 89'
Manager:
(Republic of Ireland) Tommy Barrett

== Promotion/relegation play-off ==
=== Background ===
Waterford took on Galway United at the RSC on the last day of the season, where they needed to win to avoid the relegation play-off. However, a 1−1 draw saw Waterford confirm their spot in 9th and in the play-offs.

==== League Table ====
Pos	Team	Pld	W	D	L	GF	GA	GD	Pts	Qualification or relegation
6	Drogheda United	36	12	15	9	38	38	0	51	
7	Sligo Rovers	36	11	8	17	42	54	−12	41	
8	Galway United	36	9	12	15	37	44	−7	39	
9	Waterford (O)	36	11	6	19	41	60	−19	39	Qualification for promotion/relegation play-off
10	Cork City (R)	36	4	12	20	33	61	−28	24	Relegation to League of Ireland First Division

Source: SSE Airtricity League, Soccerway
Rules for classification: 1) Points; 2) Goal difference; 3) Goals scored.
(O) Play-off winners; (R) Relegated

=== Details ===
7 November 2025
19:45 IST

Bray Wanderers	1−2	Waterford
Knight 8'; Warren (red card) 90+3'	Report	Noonan 30'; Glenfield 75'; Bakboord (red card) 90+3'

Tolka Park, Dublin
Attendance: 3,648
Referee: Kevin O'Sullivan

Bray Wanderers	Waterford

GK	1	(Republic of Ireland) Jimmy Corcoran
DF	2	(Republic of Ireland) Max Murphy	(yellow card) 90+3'
DF	4	(Republic of Ireland) Kilian Cantwell (c)
DF	6	(Republic of Ireland) Harvey Warren
DF	14	(Republic of Ireland) Cian Curtis
DF	20	(Republic of Ireland) Alain Kizenga		(substituted off) 85'
MF	7	(Republic of Ireland) Conor Knight		(substituted off) 57'
MF	8	(Republic of Ireland) Rhys Bartley		(substituted off) 75'
MF	17	(Republic of Ireland) Cian Doyle	(yellow card) 59'
MF	27	(Republic of Ireland) Sean Brennan		(substituted off) 85'
FW	11	(Republic of Ireland) Justin Ferizaj
Substitutes:
GK	25	(Republic of Ireland) Stephen McGuinness
DF	12	(Republic of Ireland) Jamie Duggan
DF	16	(Republic of Ireland) Paul Murphy
DF	30	(Republic of Ireland) Benjamin Fagbemi
FW	10	(Spain) Guillermo Almirall		(substituted on) 85'
MF	32	(Republic of Ireland) Richard Ferizaj		(substituted on) 85'
FW	19	(Republic of Ireland) Billy O'Neill		(substituted on) 57'
FW	21	(Republic of Ireland) Rhys Knight		(substituted on) 75'
FW	34	(Republic of Ireland) Matthew Britton
Manager:
(Republic of Ireland) Paul Heffernan

GK	1	(Northern Ireland) Stephen McMullan
DF	3	(Republic of Ireland) Ryan Burke	(yellow card) 52'
DF	5	(England) Grant Horton
DF	15	(Republic of Ireland) Darragh Leahy
MF	8	(England) James Olayinka
MF	10	(Scotland) Matty Smith		(substituted off) 77'
MF	16	(England) Kyle White (c)	(yellow card) 64'
MF	20	(Republic of Ireland) Conan Noonan
MF	27	(Republic of Ireland) Dean McMenamy		(substituted off) 60'
FW	9	(Republic of Ireland) Pádraig Amond
FW	18	(Republic of Ireland) Tommy Lonergan		(substituted off) 85'
Substitutes:
GK	31	(England) Bradley Wade
DF	2	(Suriname) Navajo Bakboord		(substituted on) 77'
DF	14	(Republic of Ireland) Jesse Dempsey
DF	22	(Republic of Ireland) Ronan Mansfield
DF	47	(Republic of Ireland) Sean Keane
MF	19	(Northern Ireland) Sam Glenfield	(yellow card) 76'	(substituted on) 60'
MF	21	(England) Josh Miles
MF	99	(England) Trae Coyle
FW	7	(England) Muhammadu Faal		(substituted on) 85'
Manager:
(England) Matt Lawlor
