= Adam Brennan =

Irish footballer

Personal information
- Date of birth: 29 May 2007 (age 19)
- Place of birth: Blanchardstown, Dublin, Republic of Ireland
- Position: Winger

Team information
- Current team: Shamrock Rovers
- Number: 19

Youth career
- Clonee United
- –2021: Mount Merrion
- 2021–2024: UCD

Senior career*
Years	Team	Apps	(Gls)
2024–2025	UCD	40	(10)
2026–	Shamrock Rovers	28	(5)

International career^{‡}
2025	Republic of Ireland U19	6	(1)
2026–	Republic of Ireland U21	3	(0)
2026–	Republic of Ireland	1	(0)
- * Club domestic league appearances and goals as of 17:16, 5 November 2026 (UTC) ‡ National team caps and goals as of 00:06, 18 November 2026 (UTC)

Adam Brennan (born 29 May 2007) is an Irish professional footballer who plays as a winger for League of Ireland Premier Division club Shamrock Rovers and the Republic of Ireland national team. He previously played for UCD, where he started his senior career.

== Club career ==
=== Youth career ===
A native of Blanchardstown, County Dublin, Brennan began playing football with nearby club Clonee United, the for Mount Merrion before joining the academy of League of Ireland club UCD at Under-14 level in 2021, then progressing through their Under-15, Under-17 and Under-20 sides over the following 3 years. He featured in all 4 of his club's UEFA Youth League fixtures in 2024, scoring in a 3–0 win over Stjarnan of Iceland on 18 September 2024.

=== UCD ===
On 26 April 2024, Brennan made his senior League of Ireland First Division debut for UCD, with a late cameo off the bench in injury time of a 2–0 win away to Treaty United. On 11 October 2024, he scored his first goal at senior level, in a 2–2 draw once again away to Treaty United. His debut season at senior level in 2024 saw him make 12 appearances, scoring 1 goal. He scored 9 goals in 33 appearances in all competitions in 2025, with his form attracting interest from several EFL Championship clubs including Hull City.

=== Shamrock Rovers ===
On 30 January 2026, he signed for League of Ireland Premier Division club Shamrock Rovers, turning down Hull City in the process of doing so. The day after signing, he made his debut off the bench in the 2026 President of Ireland's Cup as his side were defeated 1–0 by Derry City at Tallaght Stadium. On 20 February 2026, he made his first start for the club in their first league game of the season and scored his first goal for the club, the second goal in a 2–0 victory over rivals St Patrick's Athletic at Tallaght Stadium. On 23 October 2026, he scored the first two goals of the game in a 4–0 win over Sligo Rovers that saw his side crowned 2026 League of Ireland Premier Division champions.

== International career ==
On 5 September 2025, Brennan made his international debut, starting for the Republic of Ireland U19 team in a 4–1 defeat to France U19 in a friendly at INF Clairefontaine. On 18 November 2025, he scored his first goal at international level, in a 4–2 defeat away to Netherlands U19 in a 2026 UEFA European Under-19 Championship qualifier. In March 2026, he was reportedly named in senior Republic of Ireland manager Heimir Hallgrímsson's long-list provisional squad for their 2026 FIFA World Cup play-off fixtures. He did not make the full senior squad for those fixtures but received his first Republic of Ireland U21 call up the same month.

On 17 May 2026, Brennan received his first call up to the Republic of Ireland senior squad for friendly matches against Qatar and Canada. On 5 June 2026, Brennan made his debut as a late cameo from the bench in a 1–1 draw with Canada at the Saputo Stadium in Montreal.

== Career statistics ==
=== Club ===
As of match played on 30 October 2026

Appearances and goals by club, season and competition
Club	Season	League			National Cup		Europe		Other		Total	
Club	Season	Division	Apps	Goals	Apps	Goals	Apps	Goals	Apps	Goals	Apps	Goals
UCD	2024	LOI First Division	12	1	0	0	—		0	0	12	1
UCD	2025	LOI First Division	28	9	1	0	—		4 (Note: 2 appearances in the Leinster Senior Cup; 2 appearances in the 2025 League of Ireland play-offs)	0	33	9
UCD	Total		40	10	1	0	—		4	0	45	10
Shamrock Rovers	2026	LOI Premier Division	28	5	2	0	7 (Note: 4 appearances in the UEFA Champions League; 1 appearance in the UEFA Europa League; 2 appearances in the UEFA Conference League)	0	1 (Note: Appearance in the President of Ireland's Cup)	0	38	5
Total			68	15	3	0	7	0	5	0	83	15

=== International ===
As of match played on 5 June 2026

Appearances and goals by national team and year
National team	Year	Apps	Goals
Republic of Ireland
Republic of Ireland	2026	1	0
Total		1	0
