= Jonas Häkkinen =

Finnish soccer player (born 1999)

Personal information
- Date of birth: March 21, 1999 (age 27)
- Place of birth: Vancouver, British Columbia, Canada
- Height: 1.86 m (6 ft 1 in)
- Positions: Defender; midfielder

Team information
- Current team: Kerry
- Number: 14

Youth career
- Vancouver FC
- 2011-2018: Whitecaps FC Academy

Senior career*
Years	Team	Apps	(Gls)
2019	VPS	26	(0)
2020–2021	Haka	16	(0)
2021–2023	Cork City	60	(4)
2025	Cobh Ramblers	29	(1)
2026–	Kerry	21	(1)

International career^{‡}
2019	Finland U21	4	(0)
- * Club domestic league appearances and goals as of 8 November 2025 ‡ National team caps and goals as of 24 January 2019

Jonas Häkkinen (born March 21, 1999) is a professional footballer who plays for Kerry in the League of Ireland First Division. Born in Canada, he has represented Finland at youth level.

== Early life ==
Born in Vancouver, Canada, to Finnish parents from Turku, Häkkinen holds dual citizenship of Finland and Canada.

== Club career ==
On November 11, 2018, Häkkinen left Canada to join VPS in Finland. He departed the team upon their relegation to the Ykkönen at the end of the season.

Häkkinen signed with newly promoted side FC Haka on January 22, 2020.

Häkkinen signed contract with League of Ireland First Division team Cork City.

After a year out of the game, he signed for Cobh Ramblers on 20 January 2025.

On 8 November 2025, it was announced that Häkkinen had joined Kerry ahead of the 2026 League of Ireland First Division season.

== International career ==
In 2013, Häkkinen was part of an identification camp for the Canadian under-15 program.

Häkkinen made his debut for the Finland Under-21 national team against North Macedonia on June 6, 2019.

== Career statistics ==
As of match played on 28 October 2025

Appearances and goals by club, season and competition
Club	Season	League			National Cup (Note: Includes Suomen Cup and FAI Cup)		Other		Total	
Club	Season	Division	Apps	Goals	Apps	Goals	Apps	Goals	Apps	Goals
VPS	2019	Veikkausliiga	26	0	7	0	–		33	0
Haka	2020	Veikkausliiga	16	0	8	0	–		24	0
Cork City	2021	LOI First Division	17	1	1	0	–		18	1
Cork City	2022	LOI First Division	26	2	0	0	2 (Note: Appearance(s) in the Munster Senior Cup)	0	28	2
Cork City	2023	LOI Premier Division	18	1	2	0	0	0	20	1
Cork City	Total		61	4	3	0	2	0	66	4
Cobh Ramblers	2025	LOI First Division	29	1	1	0	4 (Note: 2 appearances in the Munster Senior Cup; 2 appearances in the 2025 League of Ireland play-offs)	0	34	1
Kerry	2026	LOI First Division	0	0	0	0	0	0	0	0
Career total			132	5	19	0	6	0	157	5

== Honours ==
Cork City

- League of Ireland First Division: 2022
