= Conan Noonan =

Irish footballer

Personal information
- Date of birth: 17 January 2003 (age 23)
- Place of birth: Naas, Republic of Ireland
- Height: 1.80 m (5 ft 11 in)
- Position: Midfielder

Team information
- Current team: Waterford
- Number: 10

Youth career
- 2018–2022: Shamrock Rovers

Senior career*
Years	Team	Apps	(Gls)
2020	Shamrock Rovers II	3	(0)
2021–2025	Shamrock Rovers	28	(0)
2025	→ Waterford (loan)	32	(6)
2026–	Waterford	34	(2)

International career^{‡}
2024	Republic of Ireland U21	1	(0)
- * Club domestic league appearances and goals as of 11:36, 9 November 2026 (UTC) ‡ National team caps and goals as of 17:30, 18 February 2025 (UTC)

Conan Noonan (born 17 January 2003) is an Irish professional footballer who plays as a midfielder for League of Ireland Premier Division club Waterford.

== Club career ==
=== Youth career ===
Naas, County Kildare man Noonan joined the academy of League of Ireland club Shamrock Rovers in 2018, initially playing for their under-15 side before progressing through the age groups at the club.

=== Shamrock Rovers ===
He made 3 appearances for the Shamrock Rovers II team in the first 3 games of their 2020 League of Ireland First Division campaign before the season stopped due to COVID-19 restrictions, with his debut coming in a 2–0 loss away to Longford Town on 22 February 2020. Noonan made his first team debut for the club on 23 July 2021, replacing Richie Towell from the bench in the 72nd minute of a 2–0 win over Galway United in the FAI Cup at Tallaght Stadium. He missed out on all of 2022 after being advised by doctors not to train due to a heart condition that came as a result of Long COVID, with symptoms including irregular heartbeats and dizziness. He made his long-awaited return to first team football on 13 March 2023 in a 2–1 loss Bray Wanderers in the Leinster Senior Cup at the Carlisle Grounds. On 3 August 2023, he made his first appearance in European football, in a 2–0 loss at home to Ferencváros in the UEFA Europa Conference League. He started in the 2024 President of Ireland's Cup on 9 February 2024 in a 3–1 win over St Patrick's Athletic at Tallaght Stadium. He made 24 appearances in all competitions in 2024.

=== Waterford ===
On 31 January 2025, Noonan joined fellow League of Ireland Premier Division club Waterford on a season long loan. On 7 February 2025, he made his debut for the club, scoring once and assisting another 2 goals in a 4–2 win over Treaty United in the Munster Senior Cup at the RSC. He scored his first league goal for the club in the first game of the season on 15 February 2025, in a 3–2 win over Sligo Rovers at The Showgrounds. On 7 November 2025, he scored his side's equaliser in an eventual 2–1 win over Bray Wanderers in the 2025 League of Ireland Premier Division Promotion/Relegation Playoff to help the club secure their Premier Division status. He scored a total of 9 goals in 36 appearances in all competitions during a hugely successful loan spell that drew reported interest in his signature on a permanent basis from St Patrick's Athletic and Sligo Rovers at the end of the season. On 5 December 2025, Noonan signed for Waterford on a permanent basis, signing a three-year-contract for a record transfer fee for Waterford, believed to be €50,000. On 8 November 2026, he started in the 2026 FAI Cup final as his side were defeated 1–0 by Derry City at the Aviva Stadium.

== International career ==
On 7 June 2024, Noonan made his international debut, replacing Joe Hodge for the Republic of Ireland U21s in the 77th minute of a 2–2 draw with England U20 in a friendly in Zagreb, Croatia.

== Career statistics ==
As of match played on 8 November 2026

Appearances and goals by club, season and competition
Club	Season	League			National Cup		Europe		Other		Total	
Club	Season	Division	Apps	Goals	Apps	Goals	Apps	Goals	Apps	Goals	Apps	Goals
Shamrock Rovers II	2020	LOI Premier Division	3	0	—		—		—		3	0
Shamrock Rovers	2021	LOI Premier Division	3	0	1	0	0 (Note: Appearances in the UEFA Champions League & UEFA Europa Conference League)	0	0 (Note: Appearance in the President of Ireland's Cup)	0	4	0
Shamrock Rovers	2022	LOI Premier Division	0	0	0	0	0 (Note: Appearances in the UEFA Champions League, UEFA Europa League & UEFA Europa Conference League)	0	0	0	0	0
Shamrock Rovers	2023	LOI Premier Division	6	0	0	0	1 (Note: Appearance in the UEFA Europa Conference League)	0	1 (Note: Appearance(s) in the Leinster Senior Cup)	0	8	0
Shamrock Rovers	2024	LOI Premier Division	19	0	1	0	3 (Note: 1 appearance in the UEFA Europa League; 2 appearances in the UEFA Conference League)	0	1	0	24	0
Shamrock Rovers	2025	LOI Premier Division	–		–		–		0	0	0	0
Shamrock Rovers	Total		28	0	2	0	4	0	2	0	36	0
Waterford (loan)	2025	LOI Premier Division	32	6	2	1	—		2 (Note: 1 appearance & 1 goal in the Munster Senior Cup; 1 appearance & 1 goal in the 2025 League of Ireland Promotion/Relegation Playoff)	2	36	9
Waterford	2026	LOI Premier Division	34	2	5	0	—		0 (Note: Appearance(s) in the Munster Senior Cup)	0	39	2
Career total			97	8	9	1	4	0	4	2	114	11

== Honours ==
Shamrock Rovers

- League of Ireland Premier Division (3): 2021, 2022, 2023
- President of Ireland's Cup (2): 2022, 2024
