= Luke O'Regan =

Irish footballer (born 2005)

Personal information
- Full name: Luke O'Regan
- Date of birth: 17 February 2005 (age 21)
- Place of birth: Dublin, Ireland
- Height: 1.82 m (6 ft 0 in)
- Position: Defender

Team information
- Current team: Shamrock Rovers
- Number: 17

Youth career
- –2022: Mount Merrion
- 2022–2024: UCD

Senior career*
Years	Team	Apps	(Gls)
2023–2026	UCD	51	(0)
2026–	Shamrock Rovers	4	(0)
2026	→ UCD (loan)	15	(0)

International career^{‡}
2023	Republic of Ireland U19	3	(0)
- * Club domestic league appearances and goals as of 17:21, 9 November 2026 (UTC) ‡ National team caps and goals as of 20:13, 31 July 2026 (UTC)

Luke O'Regan (born 17 February 2005) is an Irish professional footballer who plays as a defender for League of Ireland Premier Division club Shamrock Rovers.

== Club career ==
=== Youth career ===
O'Regan began playing football with local club Mount Merrion and attended secondary school at Blackrock College, joined the academy at UCD early in 2022 while still in school, initially playing in the League of Ireland U17 Division before working his way through the academy system up to the first team. In 2024, he played in the UEFA Youth League for the club's U19 side, in a 3–1 defeat to Kosovan side FC 2 Korriku.

=== UCD ===
On 31 March 2023, O'Regan made his senior debut for UCD, coming off the bench in the 70th minute of a 3–0 defeat in their League of Ireland Premier Division fixture at Richmond Park. On 17 August 2024, he scored the first goal of his career, in a 2–0 win away to Sligo Rovers in an FAI Cup upset at The Showgrounds. O'Regan was named UCD's Young Player of the Year for 2024, but missed a lot of 2025 through injury.

=== Shamrock Rovers ===
On 21 February 2026, it was announced that he had signed for League of Ireland Premier Division side Shamrock Rovers, with O'Regan set to remain on loan at UCD for the first half of the season alongside training with Shamrock Rovers by day. He made 15 appearances back on loan at UCD before returning to Rovers in July 2026. On 7 July 2026, he made his Rovers debut, replacing Jake Mulraney from the bench in a 2–0 loss away to Maltese side Floriana in the UEFA Champions League.

== International career ==
O'Regan made his international debut on 9 September 2023, for the Republic of Ireland U19 side in a 1–0 loss to Bosnia and Herzegovina U19.

== Career statistics ==
As of match played on 30 October 2026

Appearances and goals by club, season and competition
Club	Season	League			National Cup (Note: Includes FAI Cup)		Europe		Other		Total	
Club	Season	Division	Apps	Goals	Apps	Goals	Apps	Goals	Apps	Goals	Apps	Goals
UCD	2023	LOI Premier Division	15	0	0	0	–		0 (Note: Appearances in the Leinster Senior Cup)	0	15	0
UCD	2024	LOI First Division	20	0	3	1	–		3 (Note: 1 appearance in the Leinster Senior Cup; 2 appearances in the 2024 League of Ireland First Division Playoffs)	0	26	1
UCD	2025	LOI First Division	14	0	0	0	–		0	0	14	0
UCD	2026	LOI First Division	2	0	–		–		0	0	2	0
UCD	Total		51	0	3	1	–		3	0	57	1
Shamrock Rovers	2026	LOI Premier Division	4	0	2	0	2 (Note: Appearances in the UEFA Champions League)	0	–		8	0
UCD (loan)	2026	LOI First Division	15	0	–		–		–		15	0
Career total			70	0	5	1	2	0	3	0	80	1
