= 2025 League of Ireland First Division =

41st edition of the 2nd tier competition in association football in Ireland

League of Ireland First Division
- Season: 2025
- Dates: 14 February 2025 – 17 October 2025
- Champions: Dundalk (3rd title)
- Promoted: Dundalk
- Matches: 179
- Goals: 502 (2.8 per match)
- Top goalscorer: Barry Coffey (26 goals)
- Biggest home win: Cobh Ramblers 5–0 Longford Town (7 March 2025); Finn Harps 5–0 Bray Wanderers (21 March 2025); Dundalk 6–1 Athlone Town (8 August 2025)
- Biggest away win: Treaty United 0–7 Dundalk (22 August 2025)
- Highest scoring: Wexford 4–3 Kerry (27 June 2025); Dundalk 6–1 Athlone Town (8 August 2025); Treaty United 0–7 Dundalk (22 August 2025); Finn Harps 3–4 UCD (17 October 2025)
- Longest winning run: 7 matches Bray Wanderers
- Longest unbeaten run: 19 matches Dundalk
- Longest winless run: 22 matches Athlone Town
- Longest losing run: 7 matches Athlone Town
- Highest attendance: 3,358; Dundalk 3–0 Finn Harps (10 October 2025)
- Lowest attendance: 154; Athlone Town 0–0 Kerry (22 September 2025)
- Total attendance: 157,095
- Average attendance: 872
- All statistics correct as of 13 November 2025.

The 2025 League of Ireland First Division, known as the SSE Airtricity Men's First Division for sponsorship reasons, was the 41st season of the League of Ireland First Division. The competition began on 14 February 2025, and concluded on 17 October 2025.

On 10 October, Dundalk won the title after a 3–0 win against Finn Harps.

== Teams ==
Locations of the 2025 First Division teams

=== Team changes ===
The team relegated to the First Division was Dundalk, the bottom-placed team of the 2024 League of Ireland Premier Division. They replaced the one team promoted from the 2024 League of Ireland First Division, champions Cork City.

=== Stadia and locations ===
Team	Location	Stadium	Capacity
Athlone Town	Athlone	Athlone Town Stadium	5,000
Bray Wanderers	Bray	Carlisle Grounds	4,000
Cobh Ramblers	Cobh	St. Colman's Park	3,000
Dundalk	Dundalk	Oriel Park	4,500
Finn Harps	Ballybofey	Finn Park	6,000
Kerry	Tralee	Mounthawk Park	1,200
Longford Town	Longford	Bishopsgate	5,097
Treaty United	Limerick	Markets Field	5,000
UCD	Dublin	UCD Bowl	3,000
Wexford	Crossabeg	Ferrycarrig Park	2,500

=== Personnel and kits ===
Note: Flags indicate national team as has been defined under FIFA eligibility rules. Players may hold more than one non-FIFA nationality.

Team	Manager	Captain	Kit manufacturer	Shirt sponsor
Athlone Town	(Republic of Ireland) Ian Ryan	(Republic of Ireland) Oisín Duffy	Nike	Valeo Futbol
Bray Wanderers	(Republic of Ireland) Paul Heffernan	(Republic of Ireland) Kilian Cantwell	Capelli Sport	OutdoorLiving.ie
Cobh Ramblers	(Republic of Ireland) Richie Holland (interim)	(Republic of Ireland) Shane Griffin	Uhlsport	McCarthy Insurance Group
Dundalk	(Republic of Ireland) Ciarán Kilduff	(Republic of Ireland) Daryl Horgan	Playr-Fit	ZOMA
Finn Harps	(Republic of Ireland) Kevin McHugh	(Republic of Ireland) Tony McNamee	Joma	So-Lo Stores
Kerry	(Republic of Ireland) Colin Healy	(Republic of Ireland) Sean McGrath	Macron	Kerry Airport
Longford Town	(Republic of Ireland) Wayne Groves	(Republic of Ireland) Dean O'Shea	Macron	Bishopsgate
Treaty United	(Republic of Ireland) Tommy Barrett	(Republic of Ireland) Mark Walsh	O'Neills	Trade Electric Group
UCD	(Republic of Ireland) William O’Connor	(Republic of Ireland) Ronan Finn	O'Neills	Maples Group
Wexford	(Republic of Ireland) Stephen Elliott	(Republic of Ireland) Aaron Dobbs	Macron	Campion Insurance

=== Managerial changes ===
Team	Outgoing manager	Manner of departure	Date of vacancy	Position in table	Incoming manager	Date of appointment
Dundalk	(Republic of Ireland) Jon Daly	Resigned	2 November 2024	Pre-season	(Republic of Ireland) Ciarán Kilduff	6 November 2024
Wexford	(Republic of Ireland) James Keddy	Resigned	6 November 2024	Pre-season	(Republic of Ireland) Stephen Elliott	26 November 2024
Cobh Ramblers	(Republic of Ireland) Gary Hunt	Sacked	15 November 2024	Pre-season	(Northern Ireland) Mick McDermott	4 December 2024
Finn Harps	(Northern Ireland) Darren Murphy	Signed by Loughgall	25 March 2025	8th	(Republic of Ireland) Kevin McHugh	2 April 2025
Athlone Town	(Portugal) Dario Castelo	Mutual consent	12 April 2025	10th	(Republic of Ireland) Ian Ryan	8 June 2025
Kerry	(Republic of Ireland) Conor McCarthy	Mutual consent	5 May 2025	9th	(Republic of Ireland) Colin Healy	5 May 2025
Cobh Ramblers	(Northern Ireland) Mick McDermott	Sacked	17 October 2025	2nd	(Republic of Ireland) Richie Holland (interim)	17 October 2025

== League table ==
Pos	Team	Pld	W	D	L	GF	GA	GD	Pts	Promotion or qualification
1	Dundalk (C, P)	36	23	10	3	74	31	+43	79	Promotion to 2026 League of Ireland Premier Division
2	Cobh Ramblers	36	21	6	9	70	38	+32	69	Qualification for First Division play-offs
3	Bray Wanderers	36	20	2	14	63	53	+10	62	Qualification for First Division play-offs
4	UCD	36	17	8	11	50	40	+10	59	Qualification for First Division play-offs
5	Treaty United	36	13	9	14	51	48	+3	48	Qualification for First Division play-offs
6	Longford Town	36	12	9	15	43	59	−16	45	
7	Wexford	36	12	8	16	42	51	−9	44	
8	Finn Harps	35	8	12	15	42	55	−13	36	
9	Kerry	35	8	9	18	38	58	−20	33	
10	Athlone Town	36	3	11	22	29	69	−40	20	

Source: SSE Airtricity League of Ireland First Division
Rules for classification: 1) Points; 2) Goal difference; 3) Goals scored
(C) Champions; (P) Promoted

== Results ==
Teams play each other four times (twice at home and twice away).

Home \ Away	ATH	BRW	COB	DUN	FIN	KER	LON	TRU	UCD	WEX
Athlone Town	—	0–1	2–3	0–0	0–1	2–2	1–1	0–5	2–1	1–1
Athlone Town	—	0–4	0–3	1–1	0–0	0–0	1–2	2–2	1–2	1–2
Bray Wanderers	3–1	—	2–1	1–3	3–1	4–2	4–0	2–1	2–0	1–2
Bray Wanderers	3–1	—	0–2	2–0	3–2	5–1	0–2	3–2	1–3	1–0
Cobh Ramblers	2–0	2–1	—	1–2	3–1	0–0	5–0	2–1	1–0	1–3
Cobh Ramblers	2–1	3–1	—	1–2	4–1	1–0	3–1	3–0	2–2	4–0
Dundalk	1–0	2–2	1–0	—	1–1	2–0	2–1	2–2	1–1	3–0
Dundalk	6–1	3–1	1–0	—	3–0	3–3	4–1	1–1	3–2	3–2
Finn Harps	0–2	5–0	1–2	0–1	—	4–2	1–1	0–2	1–2	1–1
Finn Harps	2–1	2–2	2–2	1–0	—	1–1	0–0	1–0	3–4	1–3
Kerry	3–0	0–1	0–2	0–1	~~2–0~~ (Note: Result voided after both teams fielded ineligible players.)	—	2–0	1–0	0–1	1–1
Kerry	4–0	2–1	1–1	0–4	0–1	—	1–0	1–1	0–3	0–2
Longford Town	1–1	0–1	1–1	0–3	0–0	3–2	—	2–0	0–1	2–1
Longford Town	3–2	1–2	3–1	3–2	1–1	3–1	—	2–0	0–2	2–2
Treaty United	1–0	2–1	2–3	1–1	3–1	3–0	5–1	—	4–0	0–1
Treaty United	3–2	2–1	2–1	0–7	0–1	1–1	1–2	—	1–0	0–0
UCD	2–0	0–1	1–1	0–1	1–1	0–1	1–1	0–0	—	3–0 (Note: Awarded.)
UCD	2–2	3–2	0–3	0–1	3–1	2–1	2–1	1–1	—	1–0
Wexford	0–1	2–0	0–2	2–3	2–2	1–2	3–1	2–0	0–1	—
Wexford	0–0	0–1	3–2	0–0	2–1	4–3	0–1	0–2	0–3	—

Source: SSE Airtricity League of Ireland First Division
Legend: Blue = home team win; Yellow = draw; Red = away team win.
For upcoming matches, an "a" indicates there is an article about the rivalry between the two participants.

== Positions by round ==
To preserve chronological evolvements, any postponed matches are not included to the round at which they were originally scheduled, but added to the full round they were played immediately afterwards. For example, if a match is scheduled for round 7, but then played between rounds 8 and 9, it will be added to the standings for round 8.

Team ╲ Round	1	2	3	4	5	6	7	8	9	10	11	12	13	14	15	16	17	18	19	20	21	22	23	24	25	26	27	28	29	30	31	32	33	34	35	36
Dundalk	4	1	1	1	1	1	1	1	1	1	1	1	1	1	1	1	1	1	1	1	1	1	1	1	1	1	1	1	1	1	1	1	1	1	1	1
Cobh Ramblers	2	2	3	2	2	2	2	3	3	3	3	3	3	2	3	2	2	2	2	2	2	2	2	2	2	2	2	2	2	2	2	2	2	2	2	2
Bray Wanderers	3	5	6	4	6	7	4	2	2	2	2	2	2	3	2	3	3	3	3	3	3	3	3	3	3	3	3	3	3	3	3	3	3	3	3	3
UCD	1	4	4	5	7	5	3	5	5	7	7	6	6	6	6	6	5	5	5	5	5	5	5	4	4	4	4	4	4	4	4	4	4	4	4	4
Treaty United	7	3	2	3	3	3	5	4	6	5	6	5	4	4	4	4	4	4	4	4	4	4	4	5	5	5	5	5	5	5	5	5	5	5	5	5
Longford Town	9	8	7	10	10	10	10	8	8	8	8	9	8	10	8	8	9	9	8	8	9	8	7	7	7	9	8	9	9	9	8	8	7	7	7	6
Wexford	10	9	5	7	5	6	8	6	4	4	4	4	5	5	5	5	6	6	6	6	6	6	6	6	6	6	6	7	7	7	7	6	6	6	6	7
Finn Harps	5	7	10	8	9	8	6	7	7	6	5	7	7	7	9	9	8	8	9	9	7	7	8	8	8	7	7	6	6	6	6	7	8	8	8	8
Kerry	6	6	8	9	8	9	9	10	9	10	10	10	9	8	7	7	7	7	7	7	8	9	9	9	9	8	9	8	8	8	9	9	9	9	9	9
Athlone Town	8	10	9	6	4	4	7	9	10	9	9	8	10	9	10	10	10	10	10	10	10	10	10	10	10	10	10	10	10	10	10	10	10	10	10	10

Promotion to 2026 League of Ireland Premier Division
Qualification for League of Ireland Premier Division play-off

== Promotion/relegation play-offs ==
The ninth-placed team from the 2025 League of Ireland Premier Division will qualify for a play-off alongside the second, third, fourth, and fifth-placed teams from the 2025 League of Ireland First Division (Cobh Ramblers, Bray Wanderers, UCD, and Treaty United).

The First Division teams will contest the First Division semi-finals and final. The semi-finals were held over two legs, with the second-placed team facing the fifth-placed team and the third-placed team facing the fourth-placed team. The semi-final winners then contest the First Division final, with the winners ultimately facing the ninth-placed League of Ireland Premier Division team for the final place in the 2026 League of Ireland Premier Division.

The promotion/relegation play-offs will take place from 24 October to 7 November 2025.

=== Bracket ===
Semi-finals
4	UCD	0	2	2
3	Bray Wanderers	1	3	4
5	Treaty United (a.e.t.)	1	1	2
2	Cobh Ramblers	0	1	1

Final
3	Bray Wanderers	1
5	Treaty United	0

Promotion/relegation play-off
PD9	Waterford	2
3	Bray Wanderers	1

=== Semi-finals ===
24 October 2025	Treaty United	1–0	Cobh Ramblers	Limerick
19:45	Hanson 77'	Report		Stadium: Markets Field; Attendance: 1,849; Referee: Oliver Moran

28 October 2025	Cobh Ramblers	1–1 (a.e.t.)	Treaty United	Cobh
19:45	Whelan 90+4'	Report	Martin 105'	Stadium: St. Colman's Park; Attendance: 1,636; Referee: Mark Houlihan

Treaty United won 2–1 on aggregate

24 October 2025	UCD	0–1	Bray Wanderers	Belfield
19:45		Report	Doyle 90+4'	Stadium: UCD Bowl; Attendance: 927; Referee: Lucas Keating

28 October 2025	Bray Wanderers	3–2	UCD	Bray
19:45	Cantwell 3'; Curtis 61'; Ferizaj 90+3'	Report	McManus 26'; Behan 90+5'	Stadium: Carlisle Grounds; Attendance: 2,030; Referee: Daniel Murphy

Bray Wanderers won 4–2 on aggregate

=== Final ===
2 November 2025	Bray Wanderers	1–0	Treaty United	Athlone
15:00	Ferizaj 90'	Report		Stadium: Athlone Town Stadium; Attendance: 1,869; Referee: Declan Toland

=== Promotion/relegation play-off ===
7 November 2025	Bray Wanderers	1–2	Waterford	Drumcondra
19:45	Knight 8' Warren (red card) 90+3'	Report	Noonan 30'; Glenfield 74' Bakboord (red card) 90+3'	Stadium: Tolka Park; Attendance: 3,648; Referee: Kevin O'Sullivan

== Season statistics ==
=== Top scorers ===
Rank	Player	Club	Goals
1	(Republic of Ireland) Barry Coffey	Cobh Ramblers	26
2	(Republic of Ireland) Mikie Rowe	Wexford	21
3	(Republic of Ireland) Lee Devitt	Treaty United	14
4	(Republic of Ireland) Gbemi Arubi	Dundalk	12
4	(Republic of Ireland) Aaron Doran	Longford Town	12
4	(Republic of Ireland) Billy O'Neill	Bray Wanderers	12
7	(Republic of Ireland) Daryl Horgan	Dundalk	11
8	(Republic of Ireland) Adam Brennan	UCD	10
8	(Republic of Ireland) Dean Ebbe	Dundalk	10
8	(Northern Ireland) Eoin Kenny	Dundalk	10
8	(Republic of Ireland) Cian Murphy	Cobh Ramblers	10
8	(Republic of Ireland) Max Murphy	Bray Wanderers	10

=== Hat-tricks ===
Player	For	Against	Result	Date	Ref.
(Republic of Ireland) Lee Devitt	Treaty United	Athlone Town	5–0 (A)	21 February 2025	
(Republic of Ireland) Sean McGrath	Kerry	Wexford	3–4 (A)	27 June 2025	
(Republic of Ireland) Shane Griffin	Cobh Ramblers	Longford Town	3–1 (H)	1 August 2025	
(Republic of Ireland) Daryl Horgan	Dundalk	Treaty United	7–0 (A)	22 August 2025	
(Republic of Ireland) Mikie Rowe	Wexford	Cobh Ramblers	3–2 (H)	19 September 2025	
(Republic of Ireland) Dean Larkin	Wexford	Finn Harps	3–1 (H)	22 September 2025	
(Republic of Ireland) Barry Coffey	Cobh Ramblers	Finn Harps	4–1 (H)	26 September 2025	
(Republic of Ireland) Billy O'Neill	Bray Wanderers	Kerry	5–1 (H)	17 October 2025	

== Attendances ==
#	Club	Average
1	Dundalk	1,859
2	Bray	1,061
3	Treaty United	1,022
4	Finn Harps	853
5	Cobh Ramblers	793
6	Kerry	669
7	Wexford	629
8	Longford Town	552
9	Athlone Town	543
10	UCD	329

== See also ==
- 2025 League of Ireland Premier Division
- 2025 League of Ireland Women's Premier Division
- 2025 FAI Cup
