= Kilian Cantwell =

Irish footballer (born 1995)

Personal information
- Full name: Kilian Cantwell
- Date of birth: 24 May 1995 (age 31)
- Place of birth: Kilkenny, Ireland
- Height: 1.86 m (6 ft 1 in)
- Position: Centre-back

Team information
- Current team: Treaty United
- Number: 44

Youth career
- Waterford United
- UCD

Senior career*
Years	Team	Apps	(Gls)
2014	Wexford Youths	27	(4)
2015–2016	Galway United	34	(1)
2017	Finn Harps	30	(1)
2018	Limerick	32	(0)
2019–2020	Bray Wanderers	44	(1)
2021	Athlone Town	20	(0)
2022–2023	Waterford	45	(1)
2024–2025	Bray Wanderers	65	(3)
2026	Kerry	18	(0)
2026–	Treaty United	0	(0)
- * Club domestic league appearances and goals as of 00:55, 30 June 2026 (UTC)

Kilian Cantwell (born 24 May 1995) is an Irish professional footballer who plays as a centre-back for League of Ireland First Division club Treaty United.

Cantwell played youth football with UCD and Waterford United, going on to play for Wexford Youths, Galway United, Finn Harps, Limerick, Bray Wanderers, Athlone Town, Waterford and Kerry.

== Career ==
=== Wexford Youths ===
After playing youth football with UCD and Waterford United. Cantwell would sign with League of Ireland First Division side Wexford Youths.

=== Galway United ===
Ahead of the 2015 season Cantwell signed with newly promoted League of Ireland Premier Division side Galway United. Cantwell didn't play many games in his first season as a result of injury, however he did feature in the 2015 League of Ireland Cup final as Galway lost on penalties to St Patrick's Athletic.

=== Finn Harps ===
On 9 January 2017 Cantwell signed for League of Ireland Premier Division side Finn Harps. Finn Harps would be relegated in Cantwell's only season at the club, missing out on the promotion/relegation play-offs due to a change in format in the League of Ireland.

=== Limerick ===
Following Finn Harps’ relegation, Cantwell would remain in the Premier Division for the 2018 season signing for Limerick. During his time at the club Limerick were relegated to the First Division losing in the promotion/relegation play-offs to Cantwell's former club, Finn Harps.

=== Bray Wanderers ===
On 7 February 2019 Cantwell signed for League of Ireland First Division club Bray Wanderers. In his second season at the club Cantwell once again participated in the promotion/relegation play-offs, losing in the semi-finals to another one of his former sides, Galway United.

=== Athlone Town ===
Ahead of the 2021 season Cantwell signed for fellow First Division side Athlone Town.

=== Waterford ===
On 2 January 2022 Cantwell signed for League of Ireland First Division club Waterford, having previously played for them as a youth player. Once again Cantwell found himself in the promotion/relegation play-offs. Waterford defeated Treaty United over two legs in the semis, and Galway United in the final, however they lost 0–1 to UCD in the Promotion/relegation play-off.

The next season, Waterford once again found themselves in the promotion/relegation play-offs, this time they beat Athlone Town in the quarter-finals and Cobh Ramblers in the semis. This set up a play-off final with Waterford's Munster rivals Cork City, which the blues won 2–1 after extra time gaining promotion to the Premier Division.

=== Bray Wanderers ===
On 23 December 2023 Cantwell joined League of Ireland First Division club Bray Wanderers for the second time. In both of his seasons back at the Carlisle Grounds, Bray made it to the play-off finals. In 2024 Bray lost the play-off finals 1–3 to Drogheda United. The next season, being captained by Cantwell, Bray would once again lose in the play-off finals, this time losing 1–2 to Cantwell's former club Waterford.

=== Kerry ===
On 18 December 2025 Cantwell signed for League of Ireland First Division side Kerry, where he was made captain upon his arrival. On 28 June 2026, the club announced Cantwell's departure alongside teammate Kieran Cooney.

=== Traty United ===
On 22 July 2026, Cantwell signed for League of Ireland First Division club Treaty United for the rest of the 2026 season.

== Career statistics ==
=== Club ===
As of match played 29 May 2026

Appearances and goals by club, season and competition
Club	Season	League			FAI Cup		League of Ireland Cup		Play-offs		Other		Total	
Club	Season	Division	Apps	Goals	Apps	Goals	Apps	Goals	Apps	Goals	Apps	Goals	Apps	Goals
Wexford Youths	2014	LOI First Division	27	4	2	0	1	0	—		1 (Note: Appearance(s) in Leinster Senior Cup)	0	31	4
Galway United	2015	LOI Premier Division	9	0	0	0	2	0	—		—		11	0
Galway United	2016	LOI Premier Division	25	1	1	0	3	0	—		—		29	1
Galway United	Total		34	1	1	0	5	0	0	0	0	0	40	1
Finn Harps	2017	LOI Premier Division	30	1	2	1	0	0	—		—		32	2
Limerick	2018	LOI Premier Division	32	0	0	0	1	0	2	0	—		35	0
Bray Wanderers	2019	LOI First Division	26	1	1	0	3	0	—		—		30	1
Bray Wanderers	2020	LOI First Division	18	0	1	0	0	0	1	0	—		20	0
Bray Wanderers	Total		44	1	2	0	3	0	1	0	0	0	50	1
Athlone Town	2021	LOI First Division	20	0	1	0	—		—		—		21	0
Waterford	2022	LOI First Division	24	0	4	0	—		4	0	—		32	0
Waterford	2023	LOI First Division	21	1	1	0	—		2	0	2 (Note: Appearance(s) in Munster Senior Cup)	0	26	1
Waterford	Total		45	1	5	0	0	0	6	0	2	0	58	1
Bray Wanderers	2024	LOI First Division	30	0	1	0	—		4	0	3	0	38	0
Bray Wanderers	2025	LOI First Division	35	3	2	0	—		4	1	1	0	42	4
Bray Wanderers	Total		65	3	3	0	0	0	8	1	4	0	80	4
Kerry	2026	LOI First Division	18	0	0	0	—		—		2	0	20	0
Treaty United	2026	LOI First Division	0	0	0	0	—		—		0	0	0	0
Career total			325	11	16	1	10	0	17	1	9	0	377	13

== Honours ==
Galway United

- League of Ireland Cup; runner up: 2015
