= Jimmy Corcoran (footballer) =

Irish footballer (born 2002)

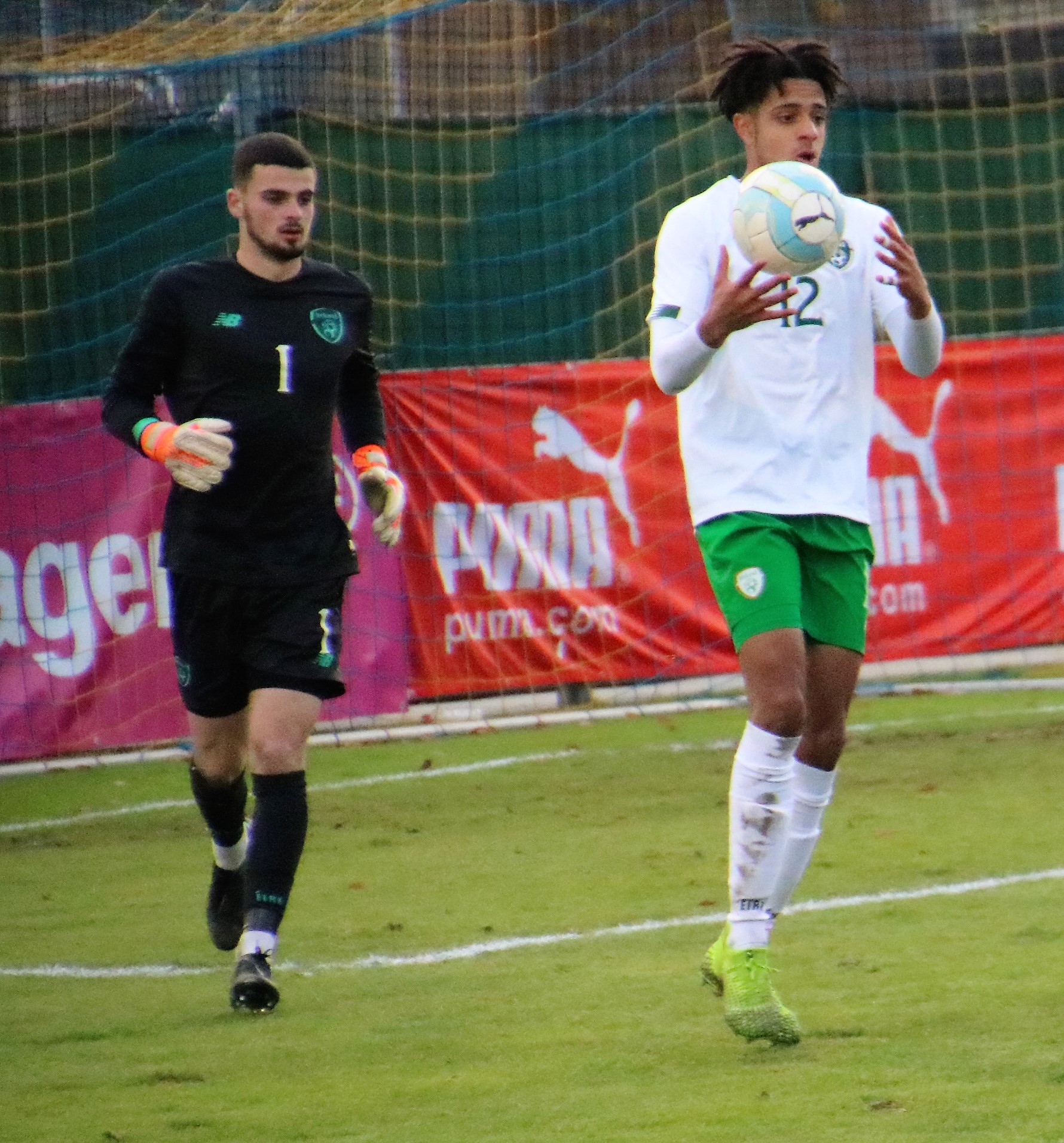
- Corcoran (left) in action for Republic of Ireland U19 in 2019.

Personal information
- Full name: James Hugh Corcoran
- Date of birth: 1 February 2002 (age 24)
- Place of birth: Republic of Ireland
- Position: Goalkeeper

Team information
- Current team: Bray Wanderers
- Number: 1

Youth career
- –2018: Cherry Orchard
- 2018–2020: Preston North End

Senior career*
Years	Team	Apps	(Gls)
2020	Dundalk	0	(0)
2021	Wexford	25	(0)
2022–2023	Cork City	41	(0)
2024–	Bray Wanderers	75	(0)

International career^{‡}
2018–2019	Republic of Ireland U17	11	(0)
2019	Republic of Ireland U18	1	(0)
2019	Republic of Ireland U19	2	(0)
- * Club domestic league appearances and goals as of 16:55, 13 August 2026 (UTC) ‡ National team caps and goals as of 11:09, 14 May 2026 (UTC)

James Hugh Corcoran (born 1 February 2002) is an Irish footballer who plays as a goalkeeper for Bray Wanderers.

== Early life ==
Corcoran played gaelic football as a child. He joined the youth academy of English side Preston North End at the age of sixteen.

== Early career ==
In 2021, Corcoran signed for Irish side Wexford. In 2022, he signed for Irish side Cork City.

=== Bray Wanderers ===
On 16 December 2023, Corcoran signed for League of Ireland First Division club Bray Wanderers. In January 2024, Corcoran kept a clean sheet on his debut for the club in a 0−0 Leinster Senior Cup draw away to Evergreen FC. On 25 March 2024, Corcoran suffered a serious shoulder injury in the second-half of Bray Wanderers 1−1 draw at home to Longford Town, his injury led to over 14 minutes of injury time being added on with Bray scoring in the 104th minute. After missing 19 matches, Corcoran returned from injury on 21 July, in a 1−0 FAI Cup loss to Shelbourne. After finishing 5th in the table Bray claimed the final play-off position. On 24 October, Corcoran kept a clean sheet in a 2−0 play-off first leg win over UCD, Bray later won the tie 2−1 on aggregate. 6 days later, Corcoran produced a memorable performance in the first division play-off final, saving two penalties in a 4−2 penalty shootout win over Athlone Town after the match had finished 2−2 after extra time, Bray had earlier trailed 2−0. Corcoran later started in the promotion play-off game as Bray lost 3−1 to Drogheda United, to remain in the first division.

On 12 December, Corcoran signed a new contract to remain with Bray for the 2025 season. Between March and April 2025, Corcoran was part of a Bray side who went on a club-record 7-match winning run with Corcoran keeping 4 clean sheets in the run. On 23 August, Corcoran saved a penalty to help Bray to a 1−0 win away to his former club Wexford. He played 35 of 36 league matches as Bray finished in 3rd place to secure a play-off position for the second straight year.

On 18 December, Corcoran signed a new contract to keep him at Bray for a third consecutive year. On 23 January, ahead of the 2026 season, Corcoran was named as captain of Bray replacing Kilian Cantwell. On 24 July 2026, it was announced that Corcoran had suffered a ruptured patellar tendon in training, ruling him out of the majority of the rest of the season, Corcoran had played every minute of Bray's 23 league games prior to his injury.

== Personal life ==
Corcoran is a native of Drumbaragh, Kells, Republic of Ireland.
