= Justin Ferizaj =

Irish footballer (born 2005)

Personal information
- Date of birth: 13 January 2005 (age 21)
- Place of birth: Dublin, Ireland
- Height: 1.74 m (5 ft 9 in)
- Positions: Left midfielder; attacking midfielder

Team information
- Current team: Crawley Town
- Number: 21

Youth career
- St Kevin's Boys
- –2022: Shamrock Rovers
- 2023–2025: Frosinone

Senior career*
Years	Team	Apps	(Gls)
2022–2023	Shamrock Rovers	9	(0)
2023–2025	Frosinone	0	(0)
2025	Bray Wanderers	11	(1)
2026–	Crawley Town	3	(0)

International career^{‡}
2019–2020	Republic of Ireland U15	3	(0)
2021–2022	Republic of Ireland U17	7	(2)
2021	Republic of Ireland U18	5	(0)
2022–2023	Republic of Ireland U19	9	(1)
- * Club domestic league appearances and goals as of 00:13, 20 July 2026 (UTC) ‡ National team caps and goals as of 21:35, 26 January 2026 (UTC)

Justin Ferizaj (born 13 January 2005) is an Irish professional footballer who plays as a left midfielder or attacking midfielder for EFL League Two club Crawley Town.

== Club career ==
=== Early career ===
Born in Dublin to Albanian parents, Ferizaj joined St Kevin's Boys as a child before moving to Tallaght-based club Shamrock Rovers.

=== Shamrock Rovers ===
Having progressed through the academy, he made his league debut in the 2022 season, in a 2–1 win over St Patrick's Athletic at Richmond Park. The same year, he went on trial with German side Hamburg, before turning down a contract offer from Italian side Sampdoria. After impressive performances, being lauded for his ability to step up to senior level, he signed a new contract with Shamrock Rovers in July 2022. Ferizaj spent time on trial at Tottenham Hotspur during the off season from Rovers, after receiving permission from the club. He scored his first goal at senior level on 13 March 2023, in a 2–1 Leinster Senior Cup defeat away to Bray Wanderers at the Carlisle Grounds.

=== Frosinone ===
On 22 August 2023, Ferizaj officially joined Serie A club Frosinone for an undisclosed fee. He was initially assigned to their Under-19 (Primavera) squad.

=== Bray Wanderers ===
On 31 July 2025, Ferizaj returned home to sign for League of Ireland First Division club Bray Wanderers, joining his brother Richard who also plays for the club. On 1 August, Ferizaj made his debut for Bray, coming off the bench against Treaty United. In the 94th minute of the game, with the score at 2–2, Ferizaj's shot from outside the box was deflected in by his brother Richard to seal a 3–2 win for Bray. On 5 September 2025, Ferizaj scored his first goal for Bray, opening in the scoring in a 3−1 win at home to Athlone Town, he also assisted his side's 2nd and 3rd goals.

=== Crawley Town ===
On 26 January 2026, Ferizaj signed a two-and-a-half year contract with EFL League Two club Crawley Town. He made his debut for the club on 14 February 2026, in a 2–0 defeat to Tranmere Rovers.

== International career ==
Ferizaj is eligible to represent either the Republic of Ireland or Albania. He has represented the Republic of Ireland at youth international level.

== Career statistics ==
As of matches played 21 February 2026

Appearances and goals by club, season and competition
Club	Season	League			National Cup (Note: Includes FAI Cup, Coppa Italia & FA Cup)		League Cup (Note: Includes EFL Cup)		Europe		Other		Total	
Club	Season	Division	Apps	Goals	Apps	Goals	Apps	Goals	Apps	Goals	Apps	Goals	Apps	Goals
Shamrock Rovers	2022	LOI Premier Division	5	0	2	0	–		9 (Note: Two appearances in UEFA Champions League qualification, two appearances in UEFA Europa League qualification, and five appearances in the UEFA Europa Conference League)	0	0	0	16	0
Shamrock Rovers	2023	LOI Premier Division	4	0	0	0	–		0 (Note: Appearances in the UEFA Champions League & UEFA Europa Conference League)	0	1 (Note: Appearance in the Leinster Senior Cup)	1	5	1
Shamrock Rovers	Total		9	0	2	0	–		9	0	1	1	21	1
Frosinone	2023–24	Serie A	0	0	0	0	–		–		–		0	0
Frosinone	2024–25	Serie B	0	0	0	0	–		–		–		0	0
Frosinone	Total		0	0	0	0	–		–		–		0	0
Bray Wanderers	2025	LOI First Division	11	1	1	0	–		–		4 (Note: Appearances in the 2025 League of Ireland play-offs)	1	16	2
Crawley Town	2025–26	EFL League Two	3	0	–		–		–		–		3	0
Career total			23	1	3	0	0	0	9	0	5	2	40	3
