= Joe Hanson (soccer) =

Canadian soccer player (born 2003)

Personal information
- Full name: Joseph Hanson
- Date of birth: August 10, 2003 (age 23)
- Place of birth: Whitehorse, Yukon, Canada
- Height: 1.90 m (6 ft 3 in)
- Position: Midfielder

Team information
- Current team: Athletic Club Boise
- Number: 17

Youth career
- 2012–2013: Total Soccer Excellence Academy
- 2014–2019: Yukon Selects FC
- 2014–2016: → Crossfire Premier
- 2019: Vancouver Island Wave
- 2019–2022: Vancouver Whitecaps FC

Senior career*
Years	Team	Apps	(Gls)
2022–2023	Whitecaps FC 2	37	(3)
2024	Valour FC	10	(0)
2025	Treaty United	19	(2)
2026–	Athletic Club Boise	17	(0)
- * Club domestic league appearances and goals as of October 28, 2026

Joseph Hanson (born August 10, 2003) is a Canadian professional soccer player who plays as a midfielder for USL League One club Athletic Club Boise. Hanson is notably the first player from the Yukon to ever sign and play professional soccer.

== Early life ==
Hanson was born in Whitehorse, Yukon to an American father and a Canadian mother. He began playing youth soccer at age five with the Total Soccer Excellence Academy, which was run by his father. He later joined Yukon Selects FC. Soon after, he had an opportunity to be a guest player from an Alaskan team, before joining Washington state club Crossfire Premier for tournament matches (but not league matches) between 2014 and 2016, where he won Washington State championships with the team at U10, U11, and U12 levels, while still also playing with the Yukon Selects. In 2018, he played at the Canada Soccer National U15 Championships, helping the Selects to a 7th place finish, which was the highest finish for a club from the Yukon. In May 2019, he joined the Vancouver Island Wave, winning the British Columbia title with them that summer. He then joined the Vancouver Whitecaps Academy in August 2019, becoming the first player from the Yukon to join the Whitecaps academy. In May 2021, he began playing with the Vancouver Whitecaps U23 team.

== Club career ==
In March 2022, he signed a professional contract with Whitecaps FC 2 in MLS Next Pro, becoming the first player from the Yukon to sign a professional soccer contract. He made his debut in the team's debut match on March 26, 2022, coming on as a substitute against Houston Dynamo 2. On April 24, 2022, he scored his first goal against Sporting Kansas City II. He departed the club after the 2023 season, upon the expiry of his contract, having made 37 appearances for the club.

In April 2024, he signed with Valour FC of the Canadian Premier League. He made his debut on April 14 against Vancouver FC, becoming the first player from the Yukon to play in the Canadian Premier League.

In February 2025, Hanson signed with Treaty United F.C. in the League of Ireland First Division. On October 24, 2025, he scored the winning goal against Cobh Ramblers in the first leg of the League of Ireland playoff semi-final. After the 2025 season, he departed the club.

On March 6, 2026, USL League One club Athletic Club Boise announced that they had signed Hanson.

== Personal life ==
During off periods from his professional career, he would return to his hometown in the Yukon to host youth soccer camps. With his status as the first player from the Yukon, he has been nicknamed 'Yukon Joe' by his teammates.

== Career statistics ==
As of August 11, 2026

Club	Season	League			Playoffs		Domestic cup		Other		Total	
Club	Season	Division	Apps	Goals	Apps	Goals	Apps	Goals	Apps	Goals	Apps	Goals
Whitecaps FC 2	2022	MLS Next Pro	17	3	—		—		—		17	3
Whitecaps FC 2	2023	MLS Next Pro	19	0	—		—		—		20	4
Whitecaps FC 2	Total		37	3	0	0	0	0	0	0	37	3
Valour FC	2024	Canadian Premier League	10	0	—		1	0	—		11	0
Treaty United	2025	League of Ireland First Division	19	2	—		0	0	3 (Note: Appearances in promotion playoffs)	1	22	3
Athletic Club Boise	2026	USL League One	13	0	0	0	4	0	—		17	0
Career total			79	5	0	0	5	0	3	1	87	6
