= Cian Doyle =

Irish footballer (born 2005)

Personal information
- Full name: Cian Doyle
- Date of birth: 7 January 2005 (age 21)
- Position: Midfielder

Team information
- Current team: Grimsby Town
- Number: 8

Youth career
- 2019–2021: Bray Wanderers
- 2022–2024: Shelbourne

Senior career*
Years	Team	Apps	(Gls)
2023–2024	Shelbourne	0	(0)
2025–2026	Bray Wanderers	53	(5)
2026–	Grimsby Town	12	(1)

International career
2019	Republic of Ireland U15	6	(0)
- * Club domestic league appearances and goals as of 12:18, 6 November 2026 (UTC)

Cian Doyle (born 7 January 2005) is an Irish footballer who plays as a midfielder for EFL League Two club Grimsby Town. Doyle had previously played for Shelbourne and Bray Wanderers before his move to England.

== Early life and youth career ==
Doyle is a native of Shankill, County Dublin, and grew up supporting Liverpool. He joined the youth system of Bray Wanderers in 2019 and remained with the club until 2021. In the summer of 2022, he left Bray to join Shelbourne.

== Club career ==
=== Shelbourne ===
Doyle progressed through Shelbourne's youth setup but did not make a league appearance for the first team, with his 6 senior appearances and 1 goal for the club coming in the Leinster Senior Cup. On 5 February 2024, he started for a youthful Shelbourne side in a 2–0 Leinster Senior Cup defeat against his former club Bray Wanderers.

=== Bray Wanderers ===
Doyle returned to League of Ireland First Division club Bray Wanderers ahead of the 2025 season, having previously represented the club at academy level between 2019 and 2021. He established himself in Bray's first team during the 2025 campaign and scored his first senior goal in a 4–2 victory over Kerry. Having made 23 appearances in all competitions and contributed three league assists during the first part of the season, Doyle signed a contract extension on 31 July 2025. First-team coach Paul Heffernan described him as a key member of Bray's midfield.

On 24 October 2025, Doyle scored a 94th-minute header as Bray defeated UCD 1–0 in the first leg of the First Division play-off semi-final. Bray subsequently won the tie 4–2 on aggregate to progress to the First Division play-off final.

Doyle became Bray's vice-captain during the 2026 season. By July 2026, he had recorded five goals and eleven assists in 53 league appearances for the club.

=== Grimsby Town ===
On 24 July 2026, it was reported that Doyle had agreed to join English EFL League Two club Grimsby Town and had travelled to England to complete the transfer. The move was confirmed on 27 July, with Doyle signing a two-year contract for an undisclosed fee.

Doyle made his Grimsby debut as a second-half substitute during a 3–1 defeat to Blackpool in the first round of the EFL Cup on 8 August 2026. He made his first League Two appearance for the club on 15 August, starting a 1–0 home victory over Exeter City.

On 29 August, Doyle scored his first Grimsby goal, converting Kieran Green's cutback in the 37th minute of a 2–2 league draw against Fleetwood Town.

== International career ==
At international youth level, Doyle represented the Republic of Ireland under-15 team.

== Career statistics ==
As of match played on 5 September 2026

Appearances and goals by club, season and competition
Club	Season	League			Domestic Cup (Note: Includes FAI Cup & FA Cup)		League Cup (Note: Includes EFL Cup)		Other		Total	
Club	Season	Division	Apps	Goals	Apps	Goals	Apps	Goals	Apps	Goals	Apps	Goals
Shelbourne	2023	LOI Premier Division	0	0	0	0	—		2 (Note: Appearances in the Leinster Senior Cup)	0	2	0
Shelbourne	2024	LOI Premier Division	0	0	0	0	—		4	1	4	1
Shelbourne	Total		0	0	0	0	—		6	1	6	1
Bray Wanderers	2025	LOI First Division	32	3	2	0	—		5 (Note: 1 appearance in the Leinster Senior Cup; 4 appearances, 1 goal in the 2025 League of Ireland play-offs)	1	39	4
Bray Wanderers	2026	LOI First Division	21	2	1	0	—		3	1	25	3
Bray Wanderers	Total		53	5	3	0	—		8	2	64	7
Grimsby Town	2026–27	League Two	12	1	0	0	1	0	2 (Note: Appearances in the EFL Trophy)	0	15	0
Career total			65	6	3	0	1	0	16	3	85	9
