= 2024 League of Ireland Premier Division =

40th season of the League of Ireland Premier Division

League of Ireland Premier Division
- Season: 2024
- Dates: 16 February 2024 – 1 November 2024
- Champions: Shelbourne (14th title)
- Relegated: Dundalk
- Champions League: Shelbourne
- Conference League: Shamrock Rovers; St Patrick's Athletic
- Matches: 180
- Goals: 408 (2.27 per match)
- Top goalscorer: Patrick Hoban; Pádraig Amond; 14 goals each
- Biggest home win: Drogheda United 7–0 Sligo Rovers (23 August 2024)
- Biggest away win: Dundalk 0–5 Sligo Rovers (4 March 2024)
- Highest scoring: Drogheda United 7–0 Sligo Rovers (23 August 2024)
- Longest winning run: St Patrick's Athletic (9 games)
- Longest unbeaten run: St Patrick's Athletic (11 games)
- Longest winless run: Dundalk (12 games)
- Longest losing run: Dundalk (5 games)
- Highest attendance: 10,094; Shamrock Rovers 3–1 Bohemians (24 May 2024)
- Lowest attendance: 1,618; Drogheda United 0–0 Galway United (23 September 2024)
- Total attendance: 628,020
- Average attendance: 3,490

The 2024 League of Ireland Premier Division, known as the SSE Airtricity Men's Premier Division for sponsorship reasons, was the 40th season of the League of Ireland Premier Division, the top Irish league for association football clubs since its establishment in 1985.

The competition began on 16 February 2024 and concluded on 1 November 2024.

On 1 November, Shelbourne won the title for the first time since 2006 after a 1–0 win against Derry City at the Brandywell on the final day of the season. That match attracted a record TV audience for a League of Ireland game.

== Teams ==
The league consisted of ten teams – the top eight teams from the previous season and two teams promoted from the First Division. The promoted teams were the 2023 League of Ireland First Division winners Galway United (after a top flight absence of six years) and play-off winners Waterford (after being absent from the top flight for two years). They replaced UCD (relegated after two consecutive seasons in the top flight) and Cork City (who spent just one season back in the top flight before being relegated following their loss to Waterford). Shamrock Rovers entered the season as defending champions after winning their twenty-first title during the previous season.

=== Stadiums and locations ===
Locations of Premier Division teams
Locations of Dublin Premier Division teams

Team	Location	Stadium	Capacity
Bohemians	Dublin (Phibsborough)	Dalymount Park	4,500
Derry City	Derry	Ryan McBride Brandywell Stadium	3,700
Drogheda United	Drogheda	Weavers Park	3,500
Dundalk	Dundalk	Oriel Park	4,500
Galway United	Galway	Eamonn Deacy Park	5,000
Shamrock Rovers	Dublin (Tallaght)	Tallaght Stadium	10,500
Shelbourne	Dublin (Drumcondra)	Tolka Park	5,700
Sligo Rovers	Sligo	The Showgrounds	3,873
St Patrick's Athletic	Dublin (Inchicore)	Richmond Park	5,340
Waterford	Waterford	RSC	5,160

=== Personnel and kits ===
Note: Flags indicate national team as has been defined under FIFA eligibility rules. Players may hold more than one non-FIFA nationality.

Team	Manager	Captain	Kit manufacturer	Shirt sponsor
Bohemians	(Republic of Ireland) Alan Reynolds	(Republic of Ireland) Keith Buckley	O'Neills	Des Kelly Interiors
Derry City	(Northern Ireland) Ruaidhrí Higgins	(Republic of Ireland) Patrick McEleney	O'Neills	Diamond Corrugated
Drogheda United	(Republic of Ireland) Kevin Doherty	(Republic of Ireland) Gary Deegan	Erreà	Drogheda Credit Union
Dundalk	(Republic of Ireland) Jon Daly	(Republic of Ireland) John Mountney	Playr-Fit	888casino
Galway United	(Republic of Ireland) John Caulfield	(Republic of Ireland) Conor McCormack	O'Neills	Comer Property Management
Shamrock Rovers	(Republic of Ireland) Stephen Bradley	(Cape Verde) Roberto Lopes	Umbro	MASCOT Workwear
Shelbourne	(Republic of Ireland) Damien Duff	(Republic of Ireland) Mark Coyle	O'Neills	Realtor Global (home) - One Coat Roof Seal (away/third)
Sligo Rovers	(Republic of Ireland) John Russell	(Republic of Ireland) Niall Morahan	Joma	Avant Money
St Patrick's Athletic	(Republic of Ireland) Stephen Kenny	(Republic of Ireland) Joe Redmond	Umbro	Manguard Plus
Waterford	(Republic of Ireland) Keith Long	(Northern Ireland) Barry Baggley	New Balance	DG Foods

=== Managerial changes ===
Team	Outgoing manager	Manner of departure	Date of vacancy	Position in table	Incoming manager	Date of appointment
Bohemians	(Northern Ireland) Declan Devine	Sacked	10 March 2024	7th	(Republic of Ireland) Derek Pender (interim)	10 March 2024
Bohemians	(Republic of Ireland) Derek Pender (interim)	End of interim spell	26 March 2024	6th	(Republic of Ireland) Alan Reynolds	26 March 2024
Dundalk	(Republic of Ireland) Stephen O'Donnell	Sacked	8 April 2024	10th	(Northern Ireland) Liam Burns & (Republic of Ireland) Brian Gartland (interim)	8 April 2024
Dundalk	(Northern Ireland) Liam Burns & (Republic of Ireland) Brian Gartland (interim)	End of interim spell	20 April 2024	10th	(Republic of Ireland) Noel King	20 April 2024
St Patrick's Athletic	(Republic of Ireland) Jon Daly	Sacked	7 May 2024	7th	(Republic of Ireland) Seán O'Connor (interim)	7 May 2024
Dundalk	(Republic of Ireland) Noel King	Resigned	15 May 2024	10th	(Northern Ireland) Liam Burns (interim)	15 May 2024
St Patrick's Athletic	(Republic of Ireland) Seán O'Connor (interim)	End of interim spell	16 May 2024	7th	(Republic of Ireland) Stephen Kenny	16 May 2024
Dundalk	(Northern Ireland) Liam Burns (interim)	End of interim spell	23 May 2024	10th	(Republic of Ireland) Jon Daly	23 May 2024

== League table ==
=== Standings ===
Pos	Team	Pld	W	D	L	GF	GA	GD	Pts	Qualification or relegation
1	Shelbourne (C)	36	17	12	7	40	27	+13	63	Qualification for Champions League first qualifying round
2	Shamrock Rovers	36	17	10	9	50	35	+15	61	Qualification for Conference League second qualifying round (Note: Drogheda United were expelled from the Conference League second qualifying round which they qualified as the 2024 FAI Cup winners, as their owners Trivela Group also own Danish club Silkeborg, who finished seventh in Danish Superliga. Due to the multi-club ownership rule, only Silkeborg could be admitted to the Conference League as they have a higher league position. As no team from Republic of Ireland could replace them because of UEFA licensing issues, the second-placed Shamrock Rovers were moved from the first qualifying round to the second qualifying round along with Dinamo City of Albania, the next highest association cup winners.)
3	St Patrick's Athletic	36	17	8	11	51	37	+14	59	Qualification for Conference League first qualifying round
4	Derry City	36	14	13	9	48	31	+17	55	
5	Galway United	36	13	13	10	33	29	+4	52	
6	Sligo Rovers	36	13	10	13	40	51	−11	49	
7	Waterford	36	13	6	17	43	47	−4	45	
8	Bohemians	36	10	12	14	39	43	−4	42	
9	Drogheda United (O)	36	7	13	16	41	58	−17	34	Qualification for promotion/relegation play-off
10	Dundalk (R)	36	5	11	20	23	50	−27	26	Relegation to League of Ireland First Division

Source: SSE Airtricity League, Soccerway
Rules for classification: 1) Points; 2) Goal difference; 3) Goals scored.
(C) Champions; (O) Play-off winners; (R) Relegated

== Results ==
Teams play each other four times (twice at home and twice away).

Home \ Away	BOH	DER	DRO	DUN	GAL	SHM	SHE	SLI	STP	WAT
Bohemians	—	2–1	1–0	1–0	0–1	1–1	0–2	2–2	2–2	0–1
Bohemians	—	1–2	0–1	1–1	1–1	2–1	1–1	0–2	1–3	2–3
Derry City	1–0	—	2–1	4–1	0–1	1–3	1–1	2–2	2–1	3–0
Derry City	1–1	—	5–1	1–1	2–0	1–1	0–1	1–1	3–1	3–0
Drogheda United	2–1	2–2	—	2–1	2–3	0–2	2–2	3–1	0–0	1–4
Drogheda United	2–2	2–1	—	0–0	0–0	0–1	1–1	7–0	0–0	2–0
Dundalk	2–0	0–0	0–0	—	0–2	1–0	0–0	0–5	0–0	0–0
Dundalk	0–2	0–2	4–2	—	0–2	0–1	0–1	1–0	1–2	0–2
Galway United	0–2	0–0	0–0	2–0	—	0–1	1–0	0–0	0–1	2–1
Galway United	1–1	1–0	3–0	1–1	—	1–2	1–0	2–2	1–1	1–0
Shamrock Rovers	3–1	2–2	4–0	1–1	1–1	—	0–2	3–0	2–2	1–3
Shamrock Rovers	1–0	1–0	1–1	1–0	1–1	—	2–0	4–0	0–3	2–1
Shelbourne	1–2	0–0	1–1	2–1	1–0	2–1	—	1–2	1–0	1–0
Shelbourne	1–1	0–0	2–1	1–0	2–0	0–0	—	0–0	2–3	3–1
Sligo Rovers	0–3	0–0	3–1	1–1	0–0	0–0	0–1	—	1–0	0–1
Sligo Rovers	0–2	2–1	2–1	2–1	2–0	2–0	2–1	—	0–2	2–0
St Patrick's Athletic	0–1	0–1	1–0	1–0	2–1	2–1	1–2	3–0	—	1–1
St Patrick's Athletic	0–0	1–0	4–1	2–3	2–1	2–1	1–2	3–2	—	3–0
Waterford	2–1	0–2	4–2	4–1	0–0	1–2	1–1	0–1	3–1	—
Waterford	1–1	0–1	0–0	2–1	1–2	1–2	0–1	4–1	1–0	—

Source: , Extratime.ie
Legend: Blue = home team win; Yellow = draw; Red = away team win.
For upcoming matches, an "a" indicates there is an article about the rivalry between the two participants.

== League of Ireland promotion/relegation play-off ==
The ninth-placed team (Drogheda United) from the 2024 League of Ireland Premier Division qualified for a play-off alongside the second, third, fourth, and fifth-placed teams from the 2024 League of Ireland First Division (Athlone Town, Bray Wanderers, UCD, and Wexford).

The First Division teams contest the semi-finals and final. The semi-finals will be held over two legs, with the second-placed team facing the fifth-placed team and the third-placed team facing the fourth-placed team. The semi-final winners then contest the First Division final, with the winners ultimately facing the ninth-placed League of Ireland Premier Division team for the final place in the 2025 League of Ireland Premier Division.

=== Bracket ===
Semi-finals
2	UCD	0	1	1
5	Bray Wanderers	2	0	2
3	Wexford	0	0	0
4	Athlone Town	1	0	1

Final
5	Bray Wanderers (p)	2 (4)
4	Athlone Town	2 (2)

Promotion/relegation play-off
Bray Wanderers	1
Drogheda United	3

=== Semi-finals ===
==== First leg ====
24 October 2024	Bray Wanderers	2–0	UCD	Bray
19:45 IST	Almirall 17'; Măgerușan 70'	Report		Stadium: Carlisle Grounds; Attendance: 1,205; Referee: Mark Houlihan

24 October 2024	Athlone Town	1–0	Wexford	Athlone
19:45 IST	Ebbe 53' (pen.)	Report		Stadium: Athlone Town Stadium; Attendance: 572; Referee: Oliver Moran

==== Second leg ====
28 October 2024	Wexford	0–0	Athlone Town	Wexford
15:00 IST		Report		Stadium: Ferrycarrig Park; Attendance: 1,251; Referee: Alan Patchell

Athlone Town won 1–0 on aggregate.

28 October 2024	UCD	1–0	Bray Wanderers	Dublin
17:00 IST	Finn 88' (pen.)		Murphy (red card) 58'	Stadium: UCD Bowl; Attendance: 1,112; Referee: Declan Toland

Bray Wanderers won 2–1 on aggregate.

=== Final ===
2 November 2024	Bray Wanderers	2–2 (a.e.t.) (4–2 p)	Athlone Town	Dublin
16:00 IST	Hand 63' (o.g.); Omorehiomwan 90+2'	Report	Ebbe 11'; Fuentes 24'	Stadium: Dalymount Park; Attendance: 1,782; Referee: Marc Lynch
	Penalties
	Griffin (penalty scored); Craven (penalty scored); Măgerușan (penalty scored); O'Sullivan (penalty scored)		(penalty missed) Connolly; (penalty scored) Torre; (penalty scored) McKenna; (penalty missed) Oakley

=== Promotion/relegation play-off ===
16 November 2024	Bray Wanderers	1–3	Drogheda United	Dublin
14:00 IST	Groome 63'	Report	Bolger 33'; Pierrot 36', 52'	Stadium: Tallaght Stadium; Attendance: 5,573

== Awards ==
=== League of Ireland Player of the Month ===
Month	Player	Club
February	(Republic of Ireland) Mark Coyle	Shelbourne
March	(England) Will Jarvis	Shelbourne
April	(Republic of Ireland) Aaron Greene	Shamrock Rovers
May	(Republic of Ireland) Pádraig Amond	Waterford
June	(England) Will Jarvis	Shelbourne
July	(Republic of Ireland) Wilson Waweru	Sligo Rovers
August	(United States) Patrick Hickey	Galway United
September	(Republic of Ireland) Jake Mulraney	St Patrick's Athletic
October	(Republic of Ireland) Seán Boyd	Shelbourne
November	(Republic of Ireland) Darragh Markey	Drogheda United

=== Annual awards ===
Award	Winner	Club
PFAI Players' Player of the Year	(Republic of Ireland) Dylan Watts	Shamrock Rovers
PFAI Young Player of the Year	(Republic of Ireland) Mason Melia	St Patrick's Athletic
PFAI Men's Premier Division Manager of the Year	(Republic of Ireland) Damien Duff	Shelbourne

PFAI Team of the Year
Goalkeeper	(Republic of Ireland) Brendan Clarke (Galway United)			
Defence	(Republic of Ireland) Joe Redmond (St Patrick's Athletic)	(Republic of Ireland) Paddy Barrett (Shelbourne)	(Republic of Ireland) Mark Connolly (Derry City)	(Republic of Ireland) Josh Honohan (Shamrock Rovers)
Midfield	(Republic of Ireland) Dylan Watts (Shamrock Rovers)		(Republic of Ireland) Mark Coyle (Shelbourne)	(Republic of Ireland) Michael Duffy (Derry City)
Attack	(Republic of Ireland) Johnny Kenny (Shamrock Rovers)		(Republic of Ireland) Patrick Hoban (Derry City)	(Republic of Ireland) Pádraig Amond (Waterford)

== Attendances ==
#	Football club	Home games	Average attendance
1	Shamrock Rovers	18	6,071
2	St Patrick's Athletic	18	4,402
3	Shelbourne	18	4,269
4	Bohemians	18	4,240
5	Galway United	18	3,014
6	Derry City	18	2,871
7	Sligo Rovers	18	2,858
8	Waterford	18	2,728
9	Dundalk	18	2,419
10	Drogheda United	18	2,023

Source: European Football Statistics

== See also ==
- 2024 President of Ireland's Cup
- 2024 League of Ireland First Division
- 2024 FAI Cup
