= Sam Glenfield =

Northern Irish footballer (born 2005)

Personal information
- Full name: Samuel Che Glenfield
- Date of birth: 10 May 2005 (age 21)
- Place of birth: Belfast, Northern Ireland
- Height: 1.80 m (5 ft 11 in)
- Position: Midfielder

Youth career
- –2020: Portadown

Senior career*
Years	Team	Apps	(Gls)
2020–2022	Portadown	8	(0)
2022–2024	Fleetwood Town	2	(0)
2024	→ Waterford (loan)	9	(2)
2025–2026	Waterford	50	(1)

International career
2021	Northern Ireland U16	1	(0)
2021	Northern Ireland U17	2	(0)
2022	Northern Ireland U18	2	(0)
2022–2024	Northern Ireland U19	7	(0)
- * Club domestic league appearances and goals as of 17:50, 9 November 2026 (UTC)

Samuel Che Glenfield (born 10 May 2005) is a Northern Irish professional footballer who plays as a midfielder.

== Club career ==
=== Portadown ===
Glenfield started his career in the youth system at Portadown and went on to make his first team debut at just 15 years of age on 24 October 2020, when he came on as a substitute in the 3–0 defeat to Coleraine at Shamrock Park. In the summer of 2021, he signed his first professional contract, a three-year deal, to keep him at the club until 2024.

=== Fleetwood Town ===
On 8 August 2022, he signed for EFL League One side Fleetwood Town and was immediately placed into the under-18 squad. Sixteen days after signing for the club, he was promoted to new manager, Scott Brown's, first team squad for the 0–0 draw against Derby County, but he remained an unused substitute. He made his first team debut on 23 August 2022, when he replaced Cian Hayes as a substitute in the EFL Cup second round 1–0 defeat to Premier League side Everton at Highbury Stadium.

=== Waterford ===
On 25 July 2024, Glenfield signed for League of Ireland Premier Division club Waterford on loan until the end of their season in November. On 26 November 2024, it was announced that Glenfield would join Waterford on a permanent basis ahead of their 2025 season. On 7 November 2025, Glenfield came off the bench to score the winner in a 2–1 victory over Bray Wanderers in the 2025 League of Ireland Promotion/Relegation play-off at Tolka Park, to preserve his side's place in the Premier Division. In November 2026, it was announced that Glenfield had been released following the end of his contract with the club.

== International career ==
Glenfield has represented Northern Ireland at under-16, under-17, under-18 and under-19 levels.

== Career statistics ==
As of match played 19 September 2026

Appearances and goals by club, season and competition
Club	Season	League			National Cup (Note: Includes Irish Cup, FA Cup & FAI Cup)		League Cup (Note: Includes EFL Cup)		Other		Total	
Club	Season	Division	Apps	Goals	Apps	Goals	Apps	Goals	Apps	Goals	Apps	Goals
Portadown	2020–21	NIFL Premiership	3	0	0	0	—		—		3	0
Portadown	2021–22	NIFL Premiership	5	0	1	0	—		0	0	6	0
Portadown	Total		8	0	1	0	—		0	0	9	0
Fleetwood Town	2022–23	League One	1	0	1	0	1	0	2 (Note: Appearances in the EFL Trophy)	0	5	0
Fleetwood Town	2023–24	League One	1	0	0	0	0	0	1	0	2	0
Fleetwood Town	Total		2	0	1	0	1	0	3	0	7	0
Waterford (loan)	2024	LOI Premier Division	9	2	1	0	—		—		10	2
Waterford	2025	LOI Premier Division	31	1	1	0	—		3 (Note: 2 appearance in the Munster Senior Cup; 1 appearance, 1 goal in the 2025 League of Ireland Promotion/Relegation play-off)	1	35	2
Waterford	2026	LOI Premier Division	19	0	0	0	—		0	0	19	0
Waterford	Total		50	1	1	0	—		3	1	54	2
Career total			69	3	4	0	1	0	6	1	80	4
