= Michael Devine (footballer) =

Irish footballer (born 1973)

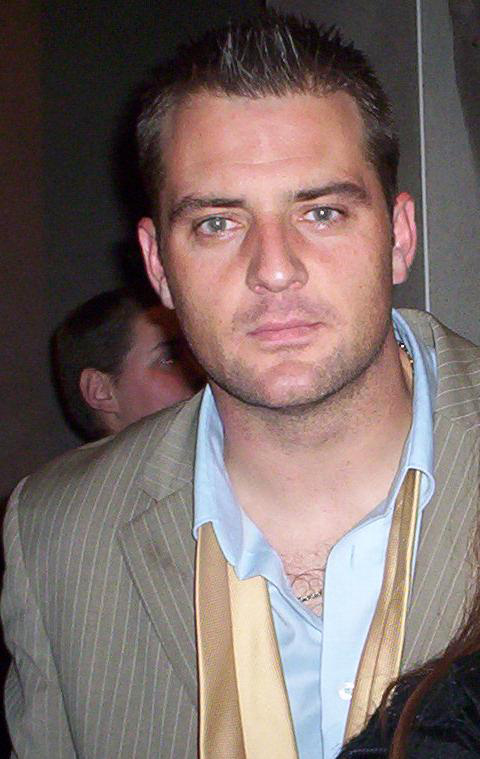

Personal information
- Date of birth: 19 March 1973 (age 53)
- Place of birth: Cobh, County Cork, Ireland
- Position: Goalkeeper

Youth career
- Springfield F.C.
- Middlesbrough

Senior career*
Years	Team	Apps	(Gls)
1993–1998	Cobh Ramblers		
1998–2000	Waterford United		
2000–2008	Cork City		
2009	Waterford United	15	(0)
2010	Cork City	0	(0)
2013–2015	Fermoy F.C.		
2015–2018	Cobh Wanderers		
- * Club domestic league appearances and goals

Michael Devine (born 19 March 1973) is an Irish former professional footballer.

== Career ==
=== Early career ===
Devine began playing football with Springfield FC in Cobh, County Cork, where he was capped at U15 and U16 levels, and thereafter signed for English team Middlesbrough. Devine spent four years at Ayresome Park learning his trade before he briefly moved on to Newcastle United and non-league Northallerton. He returned to Ireland to link up with Cobh Wanderers and subsequently joined League of Ireland First Division club Cobh Ramblers.

=== League of Ireland Premier Division ===
Devine made his Cobh debut in August 1993 as a substitute against Cork City in a League Cup tie. He joined League of Ireland Premier Division club Waterford United in 1998 and immediately impressed, later earning a then club record £30,000 transfer to Cork City. The transfer came as City and manager Derek Mountfield were in need of a keeper following a training ground injury to first choice 'keeper Noel Mooney, and Devine's form saw him retain the goalkeeper's jersey even after Mooney returned to full fitness. Noted for excellent shot stopping and spectacular saves, Devine became the "closed door" behind City's defence, eventually winning the League of Ireland championship in 2005 with many critics speculating on a senior Ireland call-up.

He returned to the Blues in January 2009. He then signed for Cork City in March 2010. "Mick Devine signs for Cork City".. He left the club later that year. In January 2018, he announced his retirement.
