= Conor McCarthy (football manager) =

Irish football manager (born 1998)

Personal information
- Date of birth: 24 October 1998 (age 28)
- Place of birth: Kilkenny, Ireland

Managerial career
- Years: Team
- Killarney Celtic (youth)
- 2019–2022: Kerry (youth)
- 2023–2025: Kerry

Conor McCarthy (born 24 October 1998) is an Irish association football manager who manages Kerry.

== Career ==
McCarthy started his managerial career as a youth manager of Killarney Celtic. In 2019, he was appointed as a youth manager of Kerry. Four years later, he was appointed manager of Kerry, becoming the youngest manager in League of Ireland history at the age of twenty-five. During his first season with the club, they finished tenth place, bottom of the league table with twenty-seven points.

== Personal life ==
McCarthy was born on 24 October 1989 in Ireland and obtained a UEFA A License. A native of Kilkenny, Ireland, he has worked as a driver for delivery company Geopost.
