= 2024 League of Ireland First Division =

39th edition of the 2nd tier competition in association football in Ireland

League of Ireland First Division
- Season: 2024
- Dates: February 2024 – October 2024
- Champions: Cork City (3rd title)

The 2024 League of Ireland First Division, known as the SSE Airtricity Men's First Division for sponsorship reasons, was the 40th season of the League of Ireland First Division. The competition began on 16 February 2024, and concluded in October 2024.

Cork City won the title for the third time.

== Teams ==
Locations of the 2024 First Division teams

=== Team changes ===
The teams relegated to the First Division were Cork City (losers of the 2023 League of Ireland Premier Division play-off) and UCD (the bottom-placed team of the 2023 League of Ireland Premier Division). They replaced the two teams promoted from the 2023 League of Ireland First Division (champions Galway United and Premier Division play-off winners Waterford).

=== Stadia and locations ===
Team	Location	Stadium	Capacity
Athlone Town	Athlone	Athlone Town Stadium	5,000
Bray Wanderers	Bray	Carlisle Grounds	4,000
Cobh Ramblers	Cobh	St. Colman's Park	3,000
Cork City	Cork	Turners Cross	7,485
Finn Harps	Ballybofey	Finn Park	6,000
Kerry	Tralee	Mounthawk Park	1,200
Longford Town	Longford	Bishopsgate	5,097
Treaty United	Limerick	Markets Field	5,000
UCD	Dublin	UCD Bowl	3,000
Wexford	Crossabeg	Ferrycarrig Park	2,500

=== Personnel and kits ===
Note: Flags indicate national team as has been defined under FIFA eligibility rules. Players may hold more than one non-FIFA nationality.

Team	Manager	Captain	Kit manufacturer	Shirt sponsor
Athlone Town	(Portugal) Dario Castelo	(Republic of Ireland) Oisín Duffy	Nike	Valeo Futbol
Bray Wanderers	(Republic of Ireland) Paul Heffernan	(Republic of Ireland) Kilian Cantwell	Capelli Sport	OutdoorLiving.ie
Cobh Ramblers	(Republic of Ireland) Gary Hunt	(Republic of Ireland) Jason Abbott	Uhlsport	McCarthy Insurance Group
Cork City	(Republic of Ireland) Tim Clancy	(Republic of Ireland) Cian Coleman	Adidas	Zeus
Finn Harps	(Northern Ireland) Darren Murphy	(Republic of Ireland) Tony McNamee	Joma	So-Lo Stores
Kerry	(Republic of Ireland) Conor McCarthy	(Republic of Ireland) Andy Spain	New Balance	Kerry Airport
Longford Town	(Republic of Ireland) Wayne Groves	(Republic of Ireland) Shane Elworthy	Macron	Bishopsgate
Treaty United	(Republic of Ireland) Tommy Barrett	(Republic of Ireland) Mark Walsh	O'Neills	Trade Electric Group
UCD	(Republic of Ireland) William O’Connor	(Republic of Ireland) Jack Keaney	O'Neills	Maples Group
Wexford	(Republic of Ireland) James Keddy	(Republic of Ireland) Ethan Boyle	Macron	Campion Insurance

== League table ==
Pos	Team	Pld	W	D	L	GF	GA	GD	Pts	Promotion or qualification
1	Cork City (C, P)	36	22	12	2	64	23	+41	78	Promotion to League of Ireland Premier Division
2	UCD	36	14	14	8	47	37	+10	56	Qualification for League of Ireland Premier Division play-off
3	Wexford	36	15	11	10	61	56	+5	56	Qualification for League of Ireland Premier Division play-off
4	Athlone Town	36	15	10	11	51	49	+2	55	Qualification for League of Ireland Premier Division play-off
5	Bray Wanderers	36	14	9	13	54	47	+7	51	Qualification for League of Ireland Premier Division play-off
6	Finn Harps	36	12	10	14	39	43	−4	46	
7	Treaty United	36	11	11	14	41	43	−2	44	
8	Cobh Ramblers	36	12	8	16	41	56	−15	44	
9	Longford Town	36	6	11	19	41	64	−23	29	
10	Kerry	36	5	12	19	34	55	−21	27	

Source: SSE Airtricity League of Ireland First Division
Rules for classification: 1) Points; 2) Goal difference; 3) Goals scored
(C) Champions; (P) Promoted

== Results ==
Teams play each other four times (twice at home and twice away).

Home \ Away	ATH	BRW	COB	COR	FIN	KER	LON	TRU	UCD	WEX
Athlone Town	—	2–1	2–1	1–0	1–0	1–1	3–3	1–0	2–2	3–0
Athlone Town	—	0–1	1–2	4–1	1–4	3–3	4–1	1–0	1–0	2–3
Bray Wanderers	3–0	—	2–2	1–3	1–0	2–0	1–1	2–1	1–2	3–4
Bray Wanderers	1–0	—	3–1	3–3	2–2	2–0	0–1	5–0	0–1	3–1
Cobh Ramblers	3–3	2–1	—	0–3	2–0	1–0	1–1	1–1	1–2	2–4
Cobh Ramblers	1–2	3–0	—	0–1	2–0	2–1	1–0	0–3	2–2	1–2
Cork City	1–0	2–0	3–0	—	1–0	2–0	2–0	1–1	1–0	1–1
Cork City	0–0	1–0	4–1	—	2–2	2–0	3–2	1–1	0–0	6–0
Finn Harps	2–0	2–0	9–0	1–1	—	0–0	3–2	1–0	1–1	1–0
Finn Harps	1–1	1–2	5–0	0–2	—	1–0	1–0	1–2	1–1	1–3
Kerry	1–2	2–3	1–1	0–1	2–0	—	3–0	0–1	1–2	1–1
Kerry	2–0	3–3	0–2	1–4	1–1	—	2–1	2–1	0–1	1–1
Longford Town	1–1	0–3	0–0	1–4	2–3	2–1	—	2–1	1–2	1–2
Longford Town	1–1	1–0	2–0	1–4	1–1	2–2	—	1–4	1–2	3–0
Treaty United	0–1	2–2	3–1	0–0	0–1	0–0	1–0	—	0–2	2–2
Treaty United	1–2	2–0	0–1	1–1	1–0	1–1	3–1	—	2–2	1–3
UCD	3–0	0–0	1–2	0–0	3–3	1–1	1–0	0–1	—	1–2
UCD	1–2	1–1	2–0	0–1	2–0	2–1	2–2	1–1	—	1–1
Wexford	2–2	1–2	1–1	1–1	1–2	2–0	2–2	3–2	2–3	—
Wexford	2–1	0–0	3–0	1–3	2–0	4–0	2–2	0–1	2–0	—

Source: SSE Airtricity League of Ireland First Division
Legend: Blue = home team win; Yellow = draw; Red = away team win.
For upcoming matches, an "a" indicates there is an article about the rivalry between the two participants.

== League of Ireland Promotion/Relegation play-off ==
The ninth-placed team (Drogheda United) from the 2024 League of Ireland Premier Division qualified for a play-off alongside the second, third, fourth, and fifth-placed teams from the 2024 League of Ireland First Division (Athlone Town, Bray Wanderers, UCD, and Wexford).

The First Division teams contested the semi-finals and final. The semi-finals were held over two legs, with the second-placed team facing the fifth-placed team and the third-placed team facing the fourth-placed team. The semi-final winners then contested the First Division final, with the winners ultimately facing the ninth-placed League of Ireland Premier Division team for the final place in the 2025 League of Ireland Premier Division. Ultimately, Drogheda United won the play-off and remained in the Premier Division.

=== Bracket ===
Semi-finals
2	UCD	0	1	1
5	Bray Wanderers	2	0	2
3	Wexford	0	0	0
4	Athlone Town	1	0	1

Final
5	Bray Wanderers	2 (4p)
4	Athlone Town	2 (2p)

Promotion/Relegation Playoff
Drogheda United	3
Bray Wanderers	1

=== Semi-finals ===
==== First leg ====
24 October 2024	Bray Wanderers	2–0	UCD	Bray
19:45 IST	Guillermo Almirall 17'; Cristian Măgerușan 70'	Report		Stadium: Carlisle Grounds; Attendance: 1,205; Referee: Mark Houlihan

24 October 2024	Athlone Town	1–0	Wexford	Athlone
19:45 IST	Dean Ebbe 53' (pen.)	Report		Stadium: Athlone Town Stadium; Attendance: 572; Referee: Oliver Moran

==== Second leg ====
28 October 2024	UCD	1–0 (1–2 agg.)	Bray Wanderers	Dublin
17:00 IST	Ronan Finn 88' (pen.)		Paul Murphy (red card) 58'	Stadium: UCD Bowl; Attendance: 1,112; Referee: Declan Toland

28 October 2024	Wexford	0–0 (0–1 agg.)	Athlone Town	Wexford
15:00 IST		Report		Stadium: Ferrycarrig Park; Attendance: 1,251; Referee: Alan Patchell

=== Final ===
2 November 2024	Bray Wanderers	2–2 (a.e.t.) (4–2 p)	Athlone Town	Dublin
16:00 IST	Hand 63' (o.g.); Omorehiomwan 90+2'	Report	Ebbe 11'; Fuentes 24'	Stadium: Dalymount Park; Attendance: 1,782; Referee: Marc Lynch
	Penalties
	Griffin (penalty scored); Craven (penalty scored); Măgerușan (penalty scored); O'Sullivan (penalty scored)		Connolly (penalty missed); Torre (penalty scored); McKenna (penalty scored); Oakley (penalty missed)

=== Promotion/Relegation Playoff ===
16 November 2024	Bray Wanderers	1–3	Drogheda United	Dublin
14:00 IST	Groome 63'	Report	Bolger 33'; Pierrot 36', 52'	Stadium: Tallaght Stadium; Attendance: 5,573

== Attendances ==
#	Club	Average
1	Cork City	2,876
2	Treaty United	1,060
3	Finn Harps	1,023
4	Cobh Ramblers	732
5	Bray	643
6	Athlone Town	642
7	Kerry	619
8	Wexford	549
9	Longford Town	449
10	UCD	334

== See also ==
- 2024 League of Ireland Premier Division
