= German Fuentes =

Salvadoran footballer

Personal information
- Full name: German Fuentes Rodríguez
- Date of birth: 27 February 1998 (age 28)
- Place of birth: Jocoro, El Salvador
- Height: 1.92 m (6 ft 4 in)
- Position: Defender

College career
Years	Team	Apps	(Gls)
2018–2019	Bunker Hill CC Bulldogs		
2019–2022	UMass Lowell River Hawks		
2022	Marist Red Foxes		

Senior career*
Years	Team	Apps	(Gls)
2023–2025	Athlone Town	75	(1)

International career^{‡}
2024–	El Salvador	2	(0)
- * Club domestic league appearances and goals as of 16:44, 8 July 2025 (UTC) ‡ National team caps and goals as of 16:44, 8 July 2025 (UTC)

German Fuentes Rodríguez (born 27 February 1998) is a Salvadoran football player who plays as a defender for the El Salvador national team.

== International career ==
Fuentes made his debut for the senior El Salvador national team on 21 March 2024 in a friendly against Bonaire, before playing in another friendly 3 days later against world champions Argentina.
