= 2026 League of Ireland First Division =

42nd edition of the 2nd tier competition in association football in Ireland

League of Ireland First Division
- Season: 2026
- Dates: 13 February 2026 – 16 October 2026
- Champions: Cork City (4th title)
- Matches: 115
- Goals: 294 (2.56 per match)
- Top goalscorer: Sean Maguire Cork City (19 goals)
- Biggest home win: Bray Wanderers 6-0 UCD (10 July 2026)
- Biggest away win: Finn Harps 0–5 UCD (12 June 2026)
- Highest scoring: UCD 5–4 Finn Harps (28 August 2026)
- Longest winning run: 9 matches Cork City
- Longest unbeaten run: 11 matches Cork City
- Longest winless run: 10 matches Athlone Town
- Longest losing run: 4 matches Finn Harps; Athlone Town
- Highest attendance: 5,366; Cork City 4–2 Kerry (6 April 2026)
- Lowest attendance: 136; UCD 2–0 Cobh Ramblers (26 June 2026)
- Total attendance: 99,482
- All statistics correct as of 5 July 2026.

The 2026 League of Ireland First Division, known as the SSE Airtricity Men's First Division for sponsorship reasons, was the 42nd season of the League of Ireland First Division for men's football. The competition happened from 13 February 2026 until 16 October 2026.

On 4 September, Cork City won the title after a 1-1 draw against Bray Wanderers.

UCD also won promotion to the Premier Division by beating Drogheda 2-1 in the promotion-relegation game on 7 Oct in Tallaght.

== Teams ==
Locations of the 2026 First Division teams

=== Team changes ===
The 2025 League of Ireland First Division, saw Dundalk promoted after one season in the First Division. They replaced Cork City who were relegated from the 2025 League of Ireland Premier Division after a single season in the Premier Division.

=== Stadia and locations ===
Team	Location	Stadium	Capacity
Athlone Town	Athlone	Athlone Town Stadium	5,000
Bray Wanderers	Bray	Carlisle Grounds	4,000
Cobh Ramblers	Cobh	St. Colman's Park	3,000
Cork City	Cork	Munster FA Turner's Cross Stadium	7,485
Finn Harps	Ballybofey	Finn Park	6,000
Kerry	Tralee	Mounthawk Park	1,200
Longford Town	Longford	Bishopsgate	5,097
Treaty United	Limerick	Markets Field	5,000
UCD	Dublin	UCD Bowl	3,000
Wexford	Crossabeg	Ferrycarrig Park	2,500

=== Personnel and kits ===
Note: Flags indicate national team as has been defined under FIFA eligibility rules. Players may hold more than one non-FIFA nationality.

Team	Manager	Captain	Kit manufacturer	Shirt sponsor
Athlone Town	(Republic of Ireland) Seán O'Connor	(Republic of Ireland) Brendan Clarke	Macron	
Bray Wanderers	(Republic of Ireland) Paul Heffernan	(Republic of Ireland) Jimmy Corcoran	Capelli Sport	OutdoorLiving.ie
Cobh Ramblers	(Republic of Ireland) Fran Rockett	(Republic of Ireland) Shane Griffin	Uhlsport	Caltech Electrical Supplies
Cork City	(Scotland) Barry Robson	(Republic of Ireland) Sean Maguire	Rebel Army	Zeus Packaging
Finn Harps	(Republic of Ireland) Patrick McEleney (interim)	(Republic of Ireland) Tony McNamee	Joma	Kernans
Kerry	(Republic of Ireland) Colin Healy	(Republic of Ireland) Sean McGrath	Macron	Kerry Airport
Longford Town	(Republic of Ireland) Wayne Groves	(Republic of Ireland) Dean George	Umbro	
Treaty United	(Republic of Ireland) Tommy Barrett	(Republic of Ireland) Mark Walsh	O'Neills	Trade Electric Group
UCD	(Republic of Ireland) William O'Connor	(Republic of Ireland) Adam Wells	O'Neills	Maples Group
Wexford	(Republic of Ireland) Stephen Elliott	(Republic of Ireland) Aaron Dobbs	Macron	Campion Insurance

=== Managerial Changes ===
Team	Outgoing manager	Manner of departure	Date of vacancy	Position in table	Incoming manager	Date of appointment
Cobh Ramblers	(Republic of Ireland) Richie Holland (interim)	End of interim spell	3 November 2025	Pre-season	(Republic of Ireland) Fran Rockett	3 November 2025
Cork City	(Republic of Ireland) Gerard Nash	Resigned	23 December 2025	Pre-season	(Scotland) Barry Robson	11 January 2026
Athlone Town	(Republic of Ireland) Ian Ryan	Resigned	6 July 2026	8th	(Republic of Ireland) Conor Barry (interim)	6 July 2026
Athlone Town	(Republic of Ireland) Conor Barry (interim)	End of interim spell	14 July 2026	7th	(Republic of Ireland) Seán O'Connor	14 July 2026
Finn Harps	(Republic of Ireland) Kevin McHugh	Change of role	26 July 2026	10th	(Republic of Ireland) Patrick McEleney (interim)	29 July 2026

== League table ==
Pos	Team	Pld	W	D	L	GF	GA	GD	Pts	Promotion or qualification
1	Cork City (C, P)	36	23	6	7	74	35	+39	75	Promotion to the League of Ireland Premier Division
2	UCD (P)	36	16	8	12	67	51	+16	56	Qualification for the First Division play-offs
3	Bray Wanderers	36	15	9	12	67	53	+14	54	Qualification for the First Division play-offs
4	Kerry	36	14	10	12	45	41	+4	52	Qualification for the First Division play-offs
5	Longford Town	36	14	10	12	49	46	+3	52	Qualification for the First Division play-offs
6	Cobh Ramblers	36	14	7	15	46	54	−8	49	
7	Athlone Town	36	13	9	14	42	43	−1	48	
8	Wexford	36	11	9	16	44	58	−14	42	
9	Treaty United	36	11	9	16	37	53	−16	42	
10	Finn Harps	36	7	7	22	33	70	−37	28	

Updated to match(es) played on 16 October 2026. Source: SSE Airtricity League of Ireland First Division
Rules for classification: 1) Points; 2) Goal difference; 3) Goals scored
(C) Champions; (P) Promoted

== Results ==
Teams play each other four times (twice at home and twice away).

Home \ Away	ATH	BRW	COB	COR	FIN	KER	LON	TRU	UCD	WEX
Athlone Town		2–1	2–0	0–3	2–1	0–0	2–0	0–0	0–2	2–2
Athlone Town		2–1	2–0	2–1	1–1	3–0	2–1	1–2	0–0	2–2
Bray Wanderers	2–1		5–1	1–1	2–2	2–1	1–1	2–2	2–1	4–0
Bray Wanderers	1–0		1–4	1–1	5–0	0–4	5–2	2–0	6–0	2–2
Cobh Ramblers	1–0	1–1		1–1	1–1	2–0	0–0	4–0	1–2	0–3
Cobh Ramblers	3–3	1–2		0–1	3–1	0–2	2–2	2–0	1–1	1–0
Cork City	4–1	1–0	0–1		4–0	4–2	2–1	1–0	3–1	2–1
Cork City	3–2	2–0	2–3		2–0	3–1	3–4	4–0	5–1	2–0
Finn Harps	1–2	2–1	0–2	0–0		1–0	2–2	2–2	2–1	1–1
Finn Harps	0–1	2–0	1–3	0–3		1–2	0–1	0–1	0–5	1–0
Kerry	0–1	2–2	1–2	1–0	1–0		1–1	1–1	1–1	2–1
Kerry	1–0	0–1	3–0	1–1	2–1		2–1	3–1	1–1	1–0
Longford Town	1–1	1–0	1–2	0–2	0–1	1–0		3–1	0–0	2–0
Longford Town	1–0	4–2	2–1	2–1	5–0	0–1		0–2	2–1	1–2
Treaty United	2–0	0–1	1–2	0–1	3–0	2–2	0–0		0–3	1–0
Treaty United	2–1	2–2	2–0	2–2	2–1	2–1	0–1		0–4	0–1
UCD	1–0	3–4	4–0	0–1	2–1	2–1	2–0	2–0		0–0
UCD	2–2	1–3	2–0	5–2	5–4	0–1	1–1	1–2		4–1
Wexford	1–0	2–1	2–0	1–4	2–0	1–1	1–2	3–2	2–1	
Wexford	0–2	2–1	3–1	0–2	1–3	2–2	3–3	0–0	2–5	

Updated to match(es) played on 16 Octobert 2026. Source: SSE Airtricity Men's First Division
Legend: Blue = home team win; Yellow = draw; Red = away team win.
For upcoming matches, an "a" indicates there is an article about the rivalry between the two participants.

== Positions by round ==
To preserve chronological evolution, we do not include postponed matches in the round they were originally scheduled for; instead, we add them to the full round they were played in immediately afterward. For example, if a match is scheduled for round 7, but then played between rounds 8 and 9, it will be added to the standings for round 8.

Team ╲ Round	1	2	3	4	5	6	7	8	9	10	11	12	13	14	15	16	17	18	19	20	21	22	23	24	25	26	27	28	29	30	31	32	33	34	35	36
Cork City	4	1	1	1	1	1	1	1	1	1	1	1	1	2	1	1	1	1	1	1	1	1	1	1	1	1	1	1	1	1	1	1	1	1	1	1
UCD	3	6	3	2	4	4	3	3	3	3	2	2	2	1	2	2	2	2	2	2	2	2	3	3	3	3	3	2	2	2	2	3	3	3	3	2
Bray Wanderers	5	3	6	4	3	2	2	2	2	4	6	5	6	6	5	3	5	4	3	3	3	3	2	2	2	2	2	3	3	3	3	2	2	2	2	3
Kerry	8	9	9	9	8	7	8	9	9	9	9	9	9	9	9	9	9	9	8	8	6	7	8	7	6	5	6	6	6	4	5	7	6	6	4	4
Longford Town	6	8	8	8	9	5	7	8	8	8	7	7	7	7	7	7	7	6	5	6	7	5	4	5	4	4	4	4	4	6	6	5	4	5	5	5
Cobh Ramblers	10	7	7	7	7	9	9	7	6	5	4	6	5	5	6	6	4	3	4	4	4	4	5	6	5	7	5	5	5	5	4	4	5	4	6	6
Athlone Town	2	2	2	3	2	3	4	6	5	6	5	4	4	4	4	5	6	7	7	7	8	8	7	8	8	9	8	7	7	7	7	6	7	7	7	7
Wexford	1	4	4	5	5	8	6	4	4	2	3	3	3	3	3	4	3	5	6	5	5	6	6	4	7	6	7	8	8	8	8	8	8	8	8	8
Treaty United	9	10	10	10	10	10	10	10	10	10	10	10	10	10	10	10	10	10	10	10	10	10	9	9	9	8	9	9	9	9	9	9	9	9	9	9
Finn Harps	7	5	5	6	6	6	5	5	7	7	8	8	8	8	8	8	8	8	9	9	9	9	10	10	10	10	10	10	10	10	10	10	10	10	10	10

Promotion to 2027 League of Ireland Premier Division
Qualification for League of Ireland Premier Division play-off

Updated to match(es) played on 16 October 2026. Source: SSE Airtricity Men's First Division

== Promotion/relegation play-offs ==
The ninth-placed team from the 2026 League of Ireland Premier Division will qualify for a play-off alongside the second, third, fourth, and fifth-placed teams from the 2026 League of Ireland First Division.

The First Division teams will contest the First Division semi-finals and final. The semi-finals are held over two legs, with the second-placed team facing the fifth-placed team and the third-placed team facing the fourth-placed team. The semi-final winners then contest the First Division final, with the winners ultimately facing the ninth-placed League of Ireland Premier Division team for the final place in the 2027 League of Ireland Premier Division.

The promotion/relegation play-offs will take place from 24 October to November 2026.

=== Bracket ===
Semi-finals
2	UCD	2	2	4
5	Longford Town	0	0	0
3	Bray Wanderers	2	3	5
4	Kerry	1	0	1

Final
2	UCD	3
3	Bray Wanderers	1

Promotion/relegation play-off
PD9	Drogheda United	1
FD2	UCD	2

=== Semi-finals ===
24 October 2026	Longford Town	0–2	UCD	Longford
19:30			Louis Dignam 28'; Hugh Smith 77'	Stadium: Bishopsgate; Attendance: 1,728; Referee: Declan Toland

27 October 2026	UCD	2–0	Longford Town	Dublin
19:45	Mikey McCullagh 20'; Hugh Smith 58'			Stadium: Belfield Bowl; Attendance: 872; Referee: Oliver Moran

24 October 2026	Kerry	1–2	Bray Wanderers	Tralee
19:45	Seán McGrath 79'; Sean McConnell (red card) 90+1'		Richard Ferizaj 54'; Ben McCormack 76'	Stadium: Mounthawk Park; Attendance: 1,120; Referee: Daniel Murphy

27 October 2026	Bray Wanderers	3–0	Kerry	Bray
19:45	John Bilili Sesay 33'; Tyreik Sammy 74'; Jamie Duggan 86'		Cian Brosnan (red card) 55'	Stadium: Carlisle Grounds; Attendance: 2,550; Referee: Lucas Keating

=== Final ===
1 November 2026	Bray Wanderers	1–3	UCD	Drumcondra
15:00	Dean O'Shea 27'		Sam Norval 32'; Behan Ciaran 39'; Hugh Smith 81'	Stadium: Tolka Park; Attendance: 2,586; Referee: Mark Houlihan

=== Promotion/relegation play-off ===
6 November 2026	Drogheda United	1–2	UCD	Tallaght
17:30	Mark Doyle 19'		Ciaran Behan 34'; Louis Dignam 66'	Stadium: Tallaght Stadium; Attendance: 3,112; Referee: Paul McLaughlin

== Season statistics ==
=== Top scorers ===
As of 18 October 2026

Rank	Player	Club	Goals
1	(Republic of Ireland) Sean Maguire	Cork City	19
2	(Republic of Ireland) Ruairí Keating	Cork City	17
3	(Republic of Ireland) Hugh Smith	UCD	15
4	(Netherlands) Hans Mpongo	Cork City	14
4	(Republic of Ireland) Mikie Rowe	Wexford	14
6	(Republic of Ireland) Ben McCormack	Bray Wanderers	13
7	(Republic of Ireland) Ciaran Behan	UCD	12
8	(Republic of Ireland) Cian Curtis	Treaty United	10
8	(Republic of Ireland) Jake Doyle	Wexford	10
10	(Republic of Ireland) Cian Murphy	Kerry	9
10	(Republic of Ireland) Louis Dignam	UCD	9
10	(Republic of Ireland) Tyreik Sammy	Bray Wanderers	9
10	(Republic of Ireland) Peter Grogan	Athlone Town	9
14	(Nigeria) Ifunanyachi Achara	Bray Wanderers	8
14	(Republic of Ireland) Dylan McGlade	Cobh Ramblers	8
14	(Republic of Ireland) Dean Williams	Longford Town	8
14	(Republic of Ireland) Aaron Doran	Longford Town	8
14	(Republic of Ireland) Jason Folarin Oyenuga	Treaty United	8

=== Hat-tricks ===
Player	For	Against	Result	Date	Ref.
(Republic of Ireland) Dylan McGlade	Cobh Ramblers	Treaty United	4–0 (H)	6 April 2026	
(Republic of Ireland) Sean Maguire	Cork City	Kerry	4–2 (H)	6 April 2026	
(Republic of Ireland) Ben McCormack	Bray Wanderers	Cobh Ramblers	5–1 (H)	8 May 2026	
(Netherlands) Hans Mpongo	Cork City	UCD	3–1 (H)	8 May 2026	
(Nigeria) Ifunanyachi Achara	Bray Wanderers	UCD	6–0 (H)	10 July 2026	
(Republic of Ireland) Ruairí Keating	Cork City	UCD	5–1 (H)	18 September 2026	

== See also ==
- 2026 League of Ireland Premier Division
- 2026 League of Ireland Women's Premier Division
- 2026 FAI National League
- 2026 FAI Cup
