= Cobh Ramblers F.C. =

Football club in Cobh, Ireland

Cobh Ramblers
- Full name: Cobh Ramblers Football Club
- Nicknames: Ramblers; The Rams; The Claret and Blue Army (supporters)
- Founded: 1922; 104 years ago
- Ground: St Colman's Park, Cobh, County Cork
- Capacity: c. 4,000
- Owner: Digital Athlete Ventures (90% stake)
- Manager: Fran Rockett
- League: League of Ireland First Division
- 2026: League of Ireland First Division, 6th of 10
- Website: cobhramblers.ie
Home colours	Away colours	Third colours

Cobh Ramblers Football Club (CRFC) is an Irish football club. The club, founded in 1922 and elected to the League of Ireland in 1985, hails from Cobh, County Cork and play their home matches at St. Colman's Park. The club's colours are claret and blue. The club was a founding member of the Cork Athletic Union League in 1947 and is the only one of the 14 founding clubs still in existence today.

== History ==
Cobh Ramblers F.C owes its formation in 1922 to the success of a challenge football match between two local field hockey clubs, 'Ramblers' and 'Cork Tramways'. Given the town's British connections at the time, hockey was relatively popular on Great Island. A desire to play football arose and the Laundry Field, at the rear of Cobh Hospital, was the venue. It was felt that an appetite existed for an official football club and preparations were made for such. At the subsequent meeting held in the Laundry, now the site of Park Road Day Centre, Cobh Ramblers A.F.C was formally established.

The Munster Football Association (M.F.A) had also been established in 1922 and the club became affiliated with the league shortly after inception. Ramblers were too late to enter the very first season, which was a short 'shield' format and ultimately won by Barrackton. The first full season of the MFA, 1922/23, saw a number of new arrivals including Ramblers, Blackrock Rovers and Shandon. The club was entered into both the South Munster Senior and Junior Leagues, one of only five clubs to feature at both levels. Matches were played at the Laundry Field and Ramblers were permitted to use the Laundry premises for dressing rooms and committee meetings. A first ever final appearance came in the form of the 1923 Munster Junior Cup, as Ramblers lost out to Barrackton in the decider.

By the 1922–23 season, the North Munster League and the South Munster League had, in effect, merged to become the Munster Senior League. Cobh Ramblers won their first Munster Senior Cup in 1925 with their first Munster Senior League title coming in 1926. By the 1926–27 season, Ramblers also had a team competing in the Munster Junior League. Additional (provincial) Munster Senior Cup titles were captured in the 1930s, 1940s, 1950s and 1970s.

While still a non-league club, Ramblers competed at a national level in the 1976–77 FAI League Cup, reaching the semi-finals.

Cobh Ramblers joined the League of Ireland in 1985, after many years as a Munster Senior League side. One of the most successful of those teams was the team of 1983, who got to the semi-final of the FAI Cup defeating several senior clubs on the way. They met Sligo Rovers in the semi-final that year, drawing crowds of over 20,000 to Flower Lodge for the home games as St Colmans Park was too small. There were three replays until Sligo finally won 3–2 and went on to win the cup.

In 1985, the FAI announced that the League of Ireland would be expanding through the creation of a second league, the First Division. Ten teams were selected to join the inaugural First Division. Cobh, Bray Wanderers, Derry City, E.M.F.A (Kilkenny City) and Newcastle United (Newcastlewest) were elected to step up from intermediate football whilst Monaghan United stepped up from the League of Ireland B Division. These six teams were joined by the bottom four clubs from the 1984/85 League of Ireland campaign, Drogheda United, Finn Harps, Longford Town and Sligo Rovers.

Chart of yearly table positions for Cobh Ramblers in League of Ireland

Cobh won promotion to the Premier Division in 1988, after finishing First Division runners-up to Athlone Town. Lasting just one season in the top flight, they won promotion again at the end of the 1992–93 season, this time as runners-up to Galway United. A play-off win over Finn Harps saw Ramblers retain their Premier Division status at the end of the 1993–94 season, but the club were relegated in second-last place the following year.

With Ramblers having played all but four of their League of Ireland campaigns in the LOI First Division, and local rivals Cork City FC more frequently playing in the LOI Premier Division, the two clubs have historically only met in pre-season friendlies and cup matches. However, during the 2022 and 2024 League of Ireland First Division seasons, when Cork City were playing in the First Division, the two teams played in what some sources described as "derby" games.

On 10 November 2007, Cobh Ramblers beat Athlone Town 1–0 in Lissywoollen to give the club their first piece of Senior Silverware and crowned them First Division Champions. During the 2007 season, they recorded a 27-game unbeaten run, keeping 22 clean sheets. Their points tally of 77 points was also a record for the league.

However, after being relegated from the League of Ireland Premier Division, Ramblers subsequently failed to obtain a licence for the First Division due to financial constraints and so compete in the Newstalk A Championship (Ireland's third tier).

In 2010 Ramblers missed out on gaining promotion back to the League of Ireland losing to Salthill Devon in a play off.

The club's most noted past player is former Irish international and Manchester United star Roy Keane, while Irish international Stephen Ireland is a product of the Youth System. Westlife singer Nicky Byrne, who was also a footballer on the books at Leeds United, had a spell with the club too.

On 18 March 2014, the club parted company with manager Dave Hill by mutual consent after five years. He was replaced by Martin Cambridge on an interim basis. In March 2015 Martin Cambridge tendered his resignation and Stephen Henderson returned to the club as first team manager. In Oct 2015 Stephen Henderson signed a new three-year contract with the club. In 2016, Henderson guided Ramblers to Munster Senior Cup victory and to a 3rd-place finish in the first division. Cobh Ramblers were the only side to defeat first division champions Limerick that season and this coincided with a run of 5 victories in their last 5 league games to reach the playoffs. They narrowly lost 3–2 on aggregate to Drogheda Utd despite overturning a 2–0 deficit in the return leg at United Park after only nine minutes.

In 2018, Ramblers reached the final of the EA Sports Cup Final. In the semi-final they defeated Dundalk 1–0 at home with striker Chris Hull scoring the winner. After defeating Dundalk, and denying the eventual champions a treble, Ramblers lost the final away to Derry City 3–1.

Having previously been a "member owned" club, in 2024 the club's members voted to accept a takeover by FC32, an international investment group which was also involved with Swiss club AC Bellizona and Austrian club SKN St. Pölten. However, in June 2025, Cobh Ramblers were reportedly "on the verge of securing an investor to replace FC32" following doubts about FC32's long-term commitment. By July 2025, a club representative stated that it had "formally and fully parted ways with FC32 Global Investments Limited" and that the club had "returned to being solely operated by its elected committee and directors". Later in July 2025, the club announced that a US-based company called Digital Athlete Ventures (DAV) had acquired a 90% stake in Cobh Ramblers.

== Stadium ==
St Colman's Park, which has a capacity of over 4,000, was redeveloped during the mid-2000s. Construction of a new changing facility and press office along with a new chairman's office was completed in 2006 along with new floodlights and a 900-seater stand replacing the old shed. The east stand, too has seen improvement with 450 new seats being installed. Plans for a new 900 seater stand adjacent to the existing stand have temporarily been put on hold due to minor financial difficulties at the club. A new slick surface was also added prior to the clubs admission to the Eircom/Airtricity League Premier Division in 2009.

== Current squad ==
As of the 2026 season, the squad includes:

Note: Flags indicate national team as defined under FIFA eligibility rules; some limited exceptions apply. Players may hold more than one non-FIFA nationality.

No.	Pos.	Nation	Player
2	DF	IRL	Callum Honohan
3	DF	IRL	Brian Linehan
4	DF	IRL	Cian Coleman
5	DF	IRL	Brendeán Frahill
6	DF	FRA	Enzo Dietrich
8	MF	SCO	Rhys Gourdie
9	FW	IRL	Kai O'Neill
10	FW	IRL	Dylan McGlade
11	FW	IRL	Anthony Adenopo
12	GK	IRL	Rory Moloney
14	FW	ENG	Jordan Adeyemi
15	DF	IRL	Lucas Curtin

No.	Pos.	Nation	Player
16	MF	IRL	Oran Crowe
17	FW	IRL	Rhys Kelly–Noonan
18	MF	IRL	Dara McCormick
19	FW	NOR	Jonas Stjernberg
20	FW	IRL	Ethan O'Donovan
22	MF	IRL	Mikey Carroll
23	MF	IRL	Shane Griffin
26	DF	IRL	Alan Zborowski (on loan from Waterford)
37	MF	IRL	James O'Halloran
38	DF	IRL	Luka Le Bervet
42	GK	LUX	Timothy Martin
45	DF	IRL	Ronan Mansfield (on loan from Waterford)

== Supporters ==
Cobh Ramblers' fanbase, sometimes known as the "Claret and Blue Army", used to locate in the East stand, behind the goal. Nowadays they locate at the far end of the South stand. There is also a Cobh Ramblers Supporters Club, who are involved in fundraising for the club.

In 2019, Cobh Ramblers changed the ownership structure of the club and became a fully supporter-owned entity. This changed in 2024, when the club members voted to "pass [ownership] into the hands of international investors". As of July 2025, the club was no longer supporter-owned.

== Honours ==
- League of Ireland First Division: 1
  - 2007
- League of Ireland Cup
  - Runners-up: 1; 2018
- Munster Senior League: 15
  - 1925–26, 1934–35, 1935–36, 1943–44, 1956–57, 1971–72, 1975–76, 1976–77, 1977–78, 1979–80, 1980–81, 1981–82, 1982–83, 1983–84, 1984–85
- Munster Senior Cup: 8
  - 1924–25, 1943–44, 1978–79, 1982–83, 2015–16, 2021–22, 2022–23, 2024–25
- FAI Intermediate Cup: 2
  - 1979–80, 1982–83
- Enda McGuill Cup (U19s): 1
  - 2013–14

== Notable former managers ==
- (Republic of Ireland) Alfie Hale (1988–1989)
- (Republic of Ireland) Damien Richardson (1995)
- (England) Ian Butterworth (1998)
- (England) Dave Hill (2009–2014)
- (Republic of Ireland) Stephen Henderson (2004–2008 & 2015–2019)
- (Republic of Ireland) Shane Keegan (2022–2023)

== Notable former players ==
- (Republic of Ireland) Roy Keane
- (Republic of Ireland) Nicky Byrne
- (Republic of Ireland) David Meyler
- (Republic of Ireland) Jaze Kabia
- (England) Jason Kabia
- (Republic of Ireland) Colin Falvey
- (England) John Hollins
- (Republic of Ireland) Stephen Ireland
- (Republic of Ireland) Graham Cummins
- (Republic of Ireland) Michael Devine
- (Republic of Ireland) Gabriel Otegbayo
- (Republic of Ireland) Adrien Thibaut
- (Republic of Ireland) Charlie Cummins
- (Republic of Ireland) Raphael-Pijus Otegbayo
