= Treaty United F.C. =

Football club in Limerick, Ireland

Treaty United
- Full name: Treaty United Football Club
- Nicknames: Super Blues; The Shannonsiders; Limericks Treaty
- Founded: 2020; 6 years ago
- Ground: Markets Field
- Capacity: 4,500 (1,710 seated)
- Chairman: Ciara McCormack
- Manager: Tommy Barrett
- League: League of Ireland First Division
- 2026: League of Ireland First Division, 9th of 10
- Website: treatyunitedfc.com
Home colours	Away colours

Treaty United Football Club is an Irish association football club based in Limerick. The club was founded in 2020 following the demise of Limerick F.C. and began playing in the League of Ireland Women's Premier Division in 2020 followed by the addition of a senior men's team to the First Division in 2021. They play their home matches at Markets Field, the same ground as their predecessors.

== History ==
=== Name ===
The name of the club stems from Limerick's nickname as "The Treaty County", itself a reference to the Treaty of Limerick of 1691, the document which brought an end to the Williamite War in Ireland.

=== Formation of the club ===
Following the liquidation of Limerick F.C. in 2019, the idea of a new team in Limerick arose. At first, it was to be called Limerick United but was forced to be changed due to threat of legal action from Limerick FC, because they had previously had that name. The name Treaty United was chosen as Limerick is known as the Treaty County, after the 1691 Treaty of Limerick. Treaty United was confirmed as the name, and the women's team Treaty United W.F.C. was ready to enter the 2020 Women's National League season and the men's the 2020 League of Ireland First Division, but the men's team withdrew their licensing application for the 2020 season. The club went through the licensing procedures the following year however and on 20 February 2021 it was announced by the Football Association of Ireland that the club had been granted a licence and would take part in the 2021 League of Ireland First Division, taking the place of Shamrock Rovers II from the previous season. Thus, the club is a continuation of senior football in Limerick, a story which began in 1937. In 2024, The club announced that it would switch primary kit colours from red and white stripes, which was an ode to the colours of the first senior football team in the county to blue and white, a colour that has been associated with football in the county since August 1943. The very presence of Treaty in the Markets Field is significant, as this is widely viewed as the historical, spiritual home of Limerick football.

=== First season ===
The club announced their 26-man first team squad and backroom staff for their first season in football under manager Tommy Barrett on 27 February 2021. They also announced that the number 4 shirt would be retired as a mark of respect to former Limerick United captain Joe O'Mahony. The club's first senior men's fixture was a 1–1 draw with Waterford in a pre-season friendly on 2 March 2021, with Limerick local Joel Coustrain getting the honour of scoring the senior men's team's first goal. The senior men's first ever competitive fixture was on the 28 March 2021 as Treaty, captained by Jack Lynch, traveled to the Carlisle Grounds and drew 0–0 with Bray Wanderers to earn their first ever League of Ireland First Division point despite finishing the match with 10 men. The club's first home game was v Wexford FC on 2nd April 2021 at Markets Field, and resulted in a 1-0 victory courtesy of Anto O'Donnell's 25th minute effort - the first League of Ireland goal scored by the club. Unusually, this game also saw them finish with ten men for the last 30 minutes. The club exceeded expectations and finished in fourth place in their first season in the League of Ireland First Division, and were beaten 3-2 on aggregate v UCD in the playoffs.

== Stadium ==
In March 2011 it was announced that the Markets Field had been purchased by the Limerick Enterprise Development Partnership (LEDP) with a charitable donation from the JP McManus Charitable Foundation, with a view towards the former Limerick FC returning to the venue for the first time since 1983. The stadium reopened in 2013. It is widely regarded as the spiritual home of Limerick football, with it hosting large soccer ties between former Limerick teams and Liverpool in 1962, along with a UEFA Cup tie against Southampton FC in 1981 and a Cup Winners Cup tie against AZ Alkmaar in 1982.

It was agreed that Treaty would be able to play in the Garryowen venue. This continues a tradition of Limerick football being played in the stadium since the 1930s.

== Players ==
=== First-team squad ===
Note: Flags indicate national team as defined under FIFA eligibility rules; some limited exceptions apply. Players may hold more than one non-FIFA nationality.

No.	Pos.	Nation	Player
1	GK	IRL	Jack Brady
2	DF	IRL	Richkov Boevi
3	DF	IRL	Ben Lynch
6	MF	IRL	Steven Healy
8	MF	IRL	Colin Conroy
9	FW	IRL	Cian Curtis
10	FW	IRL	Roy Lawlor
11	MF	IRL	Mark Byrne
12	DF	CAN	Richard Guevera
15	FW	IRL	Ben Feeney
16	DF	IRL	Eric Yoro
18	MF	IRL	Jason Folarin Oyenuga (on loan from St Patrick's Athletic)

No.	Pos.	Nation	Player
19	FW	IRL	Brian Cunningham
20	DF	IRL	Darren Nwankwo
21	GK	IRL	Kevin Fitzpatrick
25	DF	IRL	Mark Walsh (captain)
27	DF	IRL	Robbie Lynch
30	MF	IRL	Mark Murphy
31	MF	IRL	Ronan Manning
36	FW	IRL	Colm Whelan
37	FW	IRL	Dare Kareem (on loan from Drogheda United)
44	DF	IRL	Kilian Cantwell
98	DF	IRL	Billy Regan

=== Retired numbers ===
4 – (Republic of Ireland) Joe O'Mahony

== Technical staff ==
Position	Staff
Manager	Tommy Barrett
Assistant manager/goalkeeping coach	Dave Rooney
Coach	Brian O'Callaghan
Coach	Mike Kerley
Strength and conditioning coach	Mick Shiel
