= Carlisle Grounds =

Football stadium in Bray, County Wicklow, Ireland

Coordinates: 53°12′21″N 6°6′10″W

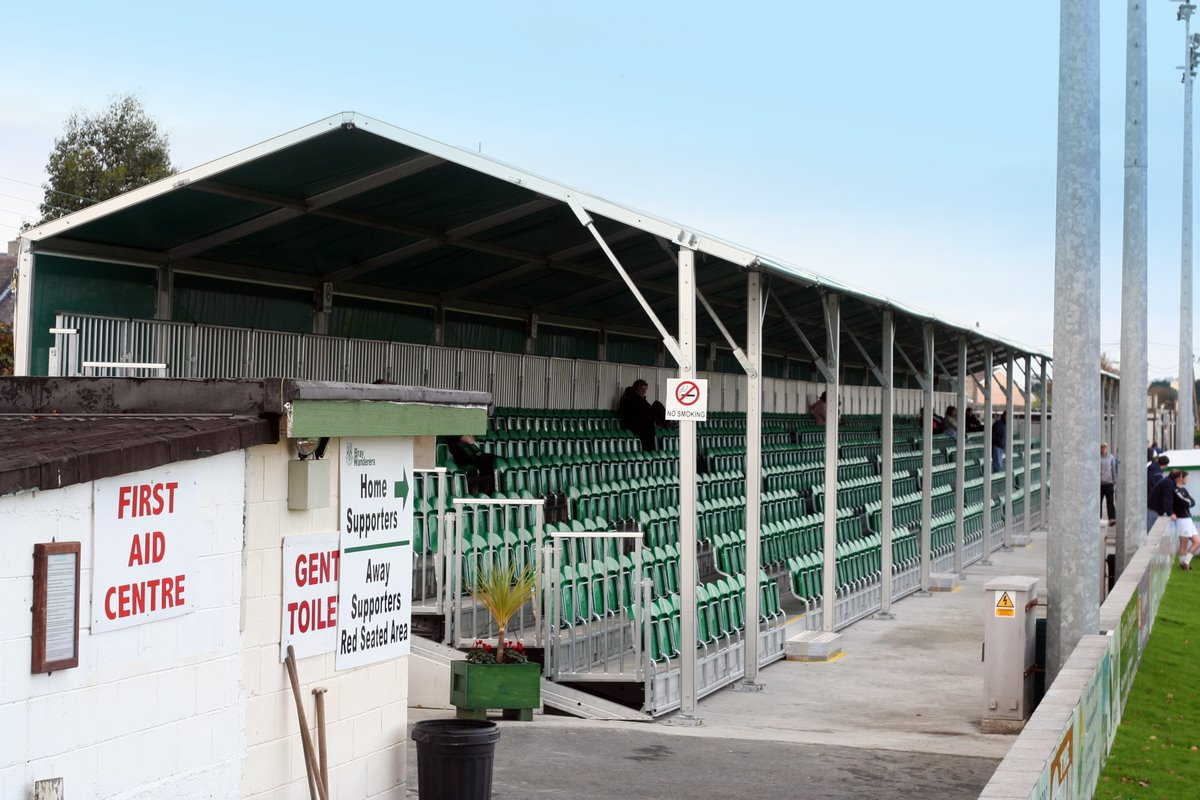
- Interactive map of Carlisle Grounds
- Capacity: 3,200
- Field size: 113 x 70 yards
- Public transit: Bray Daly railway station

Construction
- Built: 1862

Tenants
- Bray Wanderers FC; Ireland national rugby league team (2015–present)

The Carlisle Grounds is a football stadium in Bray, County Wicklow, Ireland. Situated directly behind Bray DART station, it is home to Bray Wanderers FC.

== History ==
Opened in 1862 as the Bray Athletic Ground, the Carlisle Grounds claim to be the oldest sports venue in the League of Ireland. The ground was renamed the Carlisle Cricket and Archery Ground later that year in honour of the 7th Earl of Carlisle who, in his role as Lord Lieutenant of Ireland, performed the opening ceremony. By 1870, the name had been shortened to the Carlisle Grounds. The Carlisle Grounds were designed by William Dargan, a leading railway engineer.

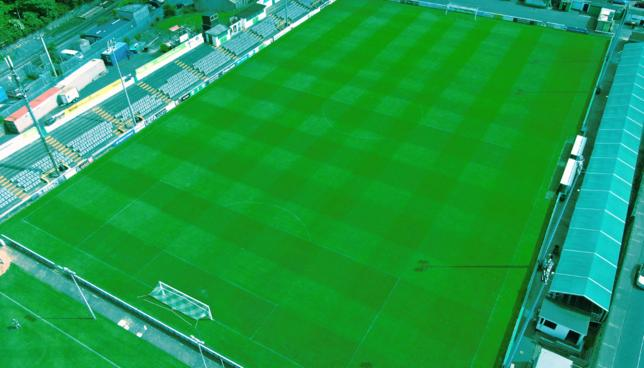
An aerial view of the Carlisle Grounds in 2024

In addition to cricket, association football and archery the ground hosted flower shows, croquet and firework displays. Between 1876 and 1880, the stadium also had an indoor roller-skating rink. Outside the venue, on Seymour Road, hackney carriages were available for hire to tour the surrounding countryside.

A new stand seating 985 was constructed in 2006 bringing the seating capacity of the ground up to about 2,000. The League of Ireland side Transport F.C. played at the Carlisle Grounds from 1948-1951 before moving to Harold's Cross Stadium. In July 2009 a section of the wall around the pitch collapsed after Shamrock Rovers fans rushed down to the wall to celebrate a goal. The following year another section of the wall fell as a result of fans rushing forward, this time while hosting their league promotion playoff against Monaghan United, prompting an FAI investigation. The Carlisle Grounds hosted a 2011 UEFA Regions' Cup match. The Carlisle Grounds also hosted two matches in the 2015 UEFA Regions' Cup.

== Rugby league ==
Ireland played against Belgium in an international rugby league friendly on Sunday 12 July 2015 winning the match 34–0. 7 November 2015 saw the Carlisle Grounds host the match between Ireland and Wales as part of the 2015 Rugby League European Championship.

International Rugby League Matches
Date	Home	Score	Opponent	Competition	Attendance
12 July 2015	Ireland	34–0	Belgium	Test match	
7 November 2015	Ireland	4–30	Wales	2015 European Championship	1,405
8 October 2016	Ireland	58–10	Malta	Test Match	
16 October 2016	Ireland	16–68	Jamaica	Test Match	
30 October 2016	Ireland	70–16	Russia	2017 RLWC qualifying	867

== In popular culture ==
The Carlisle Grounds was used in the filming of the Bloody Sunday scene in the 1996 film, Michael Collins. The ground was also used as a filming location for the music video of singer Dermot Kennedy's single "Outnumbered".

== Proposed redevelopment ==
In October 2009, details were released of a proposed largescale redevelopment of the ground. If completed as planned, the proposal would have involved a new stadium being built on the site as well as a major retailer moving in. A model of the proposed redevelopment was displayed on the club's website around this time.

== Bibliography ==
- Kennedy, Brian (2011). Just Follow the Floodlights!. The Liffey Press. ISBN 978-1-908308-03-0.
