= 2025 Galway United F.C. season =

Irish football club season

Galway United
2025 season
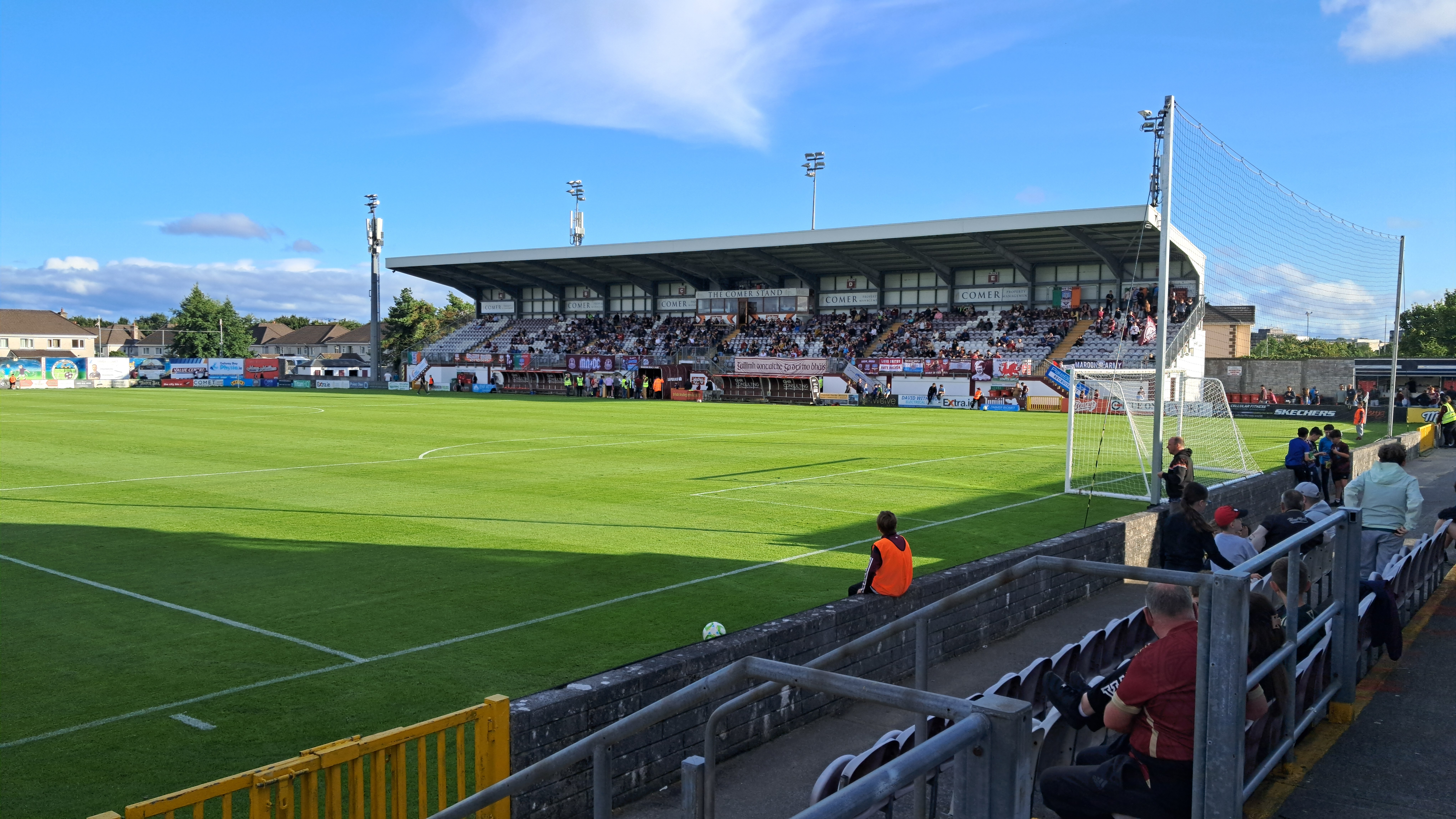
- Eamonn Deacy Park before Galway United vs Tolka Rovers in the FAI Cup on 18 July 2025
- Manager: John Caulfield
- Stadium: Eamonn Deacy Park
- Premier Division: 8th
- FAI Cup: Quarter-Final
- Top goalscorer: Moses Dyer (10)
- Highest home attendance: 4,323; 0–1 v Shamrock Rovers; 4 April 2025 (Premier Dvision)
- Lowest home attendance: 1,033; 2–0 v Tolka Rovers; 18 July 2025 (FAI Cup)
- Biggest win: 4–0 v Salthill Devon; 15 August 2025 (Home, FAI Cup)
- Biggest defeat: 0–3 v Bohemians; 11 July 2025 (Away, Premier Division)
Home colours	Away colours	Third colours

The 2025 Galway United F.C. season was the football club's 47th season in the League of Ireland and their second consecutive season in the League of Ireland Premier Division since gaining promotion in 2023.

The club finished the season in 8th, avoiding a spot in the promotion/relegation play-offs on the final day. The club also made it to the Quarter-finals of the FAI Cup before being Knocked out by St Patrick's Athletic.

== Squad ==
#	Name	Nationality	Position	Date of birth (age)	Previous club	Signed	Notes
Goalkeepers
1	Brendan Clarke	(Republic of Ireland)	GK	September 17, 1985 (aged 40)	(Republic of Ireland) Shelbourne	2023	
16	Evan Watts	(Wales)	GK	September 23, 2004 (aged 21)	(Wales) Swansea City	2025	Loan
40	MacDara Scanlon	(Republic of Ireland)	GK	January 11, 2007 (aged 18)	(Republic of Ireland) Mervue United	2025	
Defenders
3	Regan Donelon	(Republic of Ireland)	DF	April 17, 1996 (aged 29)	(Republic of Ireland) Finn Harps	2023	
4	Rob Slevin	(Republic of Ireland)	DF	July 14, 1998 (aged 27)	(Republic of Ireland) Finn Harps	2023	
5	Killian Brouder	(Republic of Ireland)	DF	August 20, 1998 (aged 27)	(Republic of Ireland) Limerick	2019	
8	Greg Cunningham	(Republic of Ireland)	DF	January 31, 1991 (aged 34)	(England) Preston North End	2024	Captain
21	Colm Horgan	(Republic of Ireland)	DF	July 2, 1994 (aged 31)	(Republic of Ireland) Sligo Rovers	2023	
26	Garry Buckley	(Republic of Ireland)	DF	August 19, 1993 (aged 32)	(Republic of Ireland) Sligo Rovers	2024	
33	Jeannot Esua	(Cameroon)	DF	August 6, 1996 (aged 29)	(Finland) Ekenäs IF	2024	
39	Billy Regan	(Republic of Ireland)	DF	October 22, 2007 (aged 18)	(Republic of Ireland) Mervue United	2024	
Midfielders
6	Axel Piesold	(England)	MF	March 31, 2005 (aged 20)	(England) Luton Town	2025	
10	David Hurley	(Republic of Ireland)	MF	October 21, 1998 (aged 27)	(Republic of Ireland) Cobh Ramblers	2021	
14	Jeremy Sivi	(England)	MF	July 18, 2002 (aged 23)	(Slovakia) Zemplín Michalovce	2025	
15	Patrick Hickey	(United States)	MF	July 2, 1998 (aged 27)	(Republic of Ireland) Athlone Town	2024	
17	Vincent Borden	(United States)	MF	February 21, 1999 (aged 26)	(Slovenia) Rudar Velenje	2023	
18	Bobby Burns	(Northern Ireland)	MF	October 7, 1999 (aged 26)	(Northern Ireland) Glentoran	2024	
20	Jimmy Keohane	(Republic of Ireland)	MF	January 22, 1991 (aged 34)	(England) Rochdale	2024	
22	Conor McCormack	(Republic of Ireland)	MF	May 18, 1990 (aged 35)	(Republic of Ireland) Derry City	2021	
24	Ed McCarthy	(Republic of Ireland)	MF	April 20, 2001 (aged 24)	(Republic of Ireland) Regional United	2022	
34	Aaron Bolger	(Republic of Ireland)	MF	February 2, 2000 (aged 25)	(Republic of Ireland) St Patrick's Athletic	2025	
Forwards
7	Stephen Walsh	(Republic of Ireland)	FW	August 29, 1990 (aged 35)	(Republic of Ireland) Galway Hibernians	2018	
11	Malcolm Shaw	(Trinidad and Tobago)	FW	July 27, 1995 (aged 30)	(Canada) Cavalry FC	2025	
27	Dara McGuinness	(Republic of Ireland)	FW	February 12, 2004 (aged 21)	(Republic of Ireland) Finn Harps	2025	
29	Cillian Tollett	(Republic of Ireland)	FW	February 9, 2008 (aged 17)	(Republic of Ireland) Oughterard AFC	2024	
31	Donnacha Sammon	(Republic of Ireland)	FW	April 4, 2007 (aged 18)	(Republic of Ireland) Colga	2025	
Players who departed before the end of the season (Note: Age shown displays players’ age at the end of the season. For players who departed before the end of the season, age shown is age at time of departure.)
2	Cian Byrne	(Republic of Ireland)	DF	January 31, 2003 (aged 22)	(Republic of Ireland) Bohemians	2025	Loan
9	Moses Dyer	(New Zealand)	FW	March 21, 1997 (aged 28)	(Canada) Vancouver FC	2025	
11	Daniel Stynes	(Australia)	MF	August 29, 1998 (aged 26)	(Australia) Newcastle Jets	2025	
12	Sean Kerrigan	(Republic of Ireland)	MF	July 5, 2002 (aged 23)	(United States) Michigan State Spartans	2025	
19	Max Wilson	(Northern Ireland)	FW	January 30, 2007 (aged 18)	(England) Preston North End	2025	Loan
28	Brian Cunningham	(Republic of Ireland)	FW	September 3, 2006 (aged 18)	(Republic of Ireland) Mervue United	2023	
32	Andrew Kempe	(Bermuda)	GK	August 26, 2000 (aged 24)	(United States) Temple Owls	2025	
35	Junior Thiam	(Republic of Ireland)	MF	October 28, 2006 (aged 18)	(Republic of Ireland) Academy	2025	Loaned Out

=== Transfers ===
==== In ====
Date	Position	Nationality	Name	Last club	Ref.
10 January 2025	GK	(Wales)	Evan Watts	(Wales) Swansea City	
12 January 2025	FW	(New Zealand)	Moses Dyer	(Canada) Vancouver FC	
12 January 2025	FW	(Australia)	Daniel Stynes	(Australia) Newcastle Jets	
24 January 2025	MF	(Republic of Ireland)	Sean Kerrigan	(United States) Michigan State Spartans	
7 February 2025	FW	(Northern Ireland)	Max Wilson	(England) Preston North End	
18 February 2025	DF	(Republic of Ireland)	Cian Byrne	(Republic of Ireland) Bohemians	
7 March 2025	GK	(Bermuda)	Andrew Kempe	(United States) Temple Owls	
11 June 2025	FW	(Trinidad and Tobago)	Malcolm Shaw	(Canada) Cavalry FC	
2 July 2025	MF	(England)	Axel Piesold	(England) Luton Town	
3 July 2025	MF	(Republic of Ireland)	Aaron Bolger	(Republic of Ireland) St Patrick's Athletic	
23 July 2025	FW	(Republic of Ireland)	Dara McGuinness	(Republic of Ireland) Finn Harps	
12 August 2025	MF	(England)	Jeremy Sivi	(Slovakia) Zemplín Michalovce	

==== Out ====
Date	Position	Nationality	Name	To	Ref.
7 November 2024	FW	(Republic of Ireland)	Francely Lomboto	(Republic of Ireland) Sligo Rovers	
15 November 2024	FW	(Republic of Ireland)	Karl O'Sullivan	(Republic of Ireland) Treaty United	
15 November 2024	FW	(England)	Junior Ogedi-Uzokwe	(Northern Cyprus) Karşıyaka Anamur	
8 December 2024	FB	(Republic of Ireland)	Conor O'Keeffe	(Republic of Ireland) Dundalk	
11 December 2024	GK	(Republic of Ireland)	Jack Brady	(Republic of Ireland) Drogheda United	
11 December 2024	MF	(Republic of Ireland)	Maurice Nugent	(Australia) Green Gully	
13 February 2025	FW	(Republic of Ireland)	Kyle Fitzgerald	(England) Newcastle United	
2 April 2025	MF	(Australia)	Daniel Stynes	(Finland) Ekenäs IF	
1 July 2025	DF	(Republic of Ireland)	Cian Byrne	(Republic of Ireland) Bohemians	
10 July 2025	FW	(Republic of Ireland)	Brian Cunningham	(Republic of Ireland) Treaty United	
19 July 2025	FW	(New Zealand)	Moses Dyer	(Cambodia) Phnom Penh Crown	
20 July 2025	MF	(Republic of Ireland)	Sean Kerrigan		
22 October 2025	GK	(Wales)	Evan Watts	(Wales) Swansea City	

==== Loan Out ====
Date	Position	Nationality	Name	To	Ref.
23 January 2025	MF	(Republic of Ireland)	Steven Healy	(Republic of Ireland) Treaty United	
23 January 2025	FW	(Republic of Ireland)	David Tarmey	(Republic of Ireland) Treaty United	
23 July 2025	MF	(Republic of Ireland)	Junior Thiam	(Republic of Ireland) Athlone Town	

== Club ==
=== Coaching staff ===
- Manager: John Caulfield
- Assistant Manager: Ollie Horgan (– 9 August), Jon Daly (9 August –)
- First Team Coach: Alan Murphy
- Goalkeeping Coach: Gianluca Aimi
- Strength and Conditioning Coach: Danny Broderick
- Physiotherapist: Richard Grier
- Analyst: Robert Crosbie
- Kitman: Kenneth Flaherty

=== Kit ===
Supplier: O'Neills
Sponsor(s): Comer Group Ireland (Front of Jersey)
Visit Loutraki.com (Back of Jersey - Top) (Away Jersey)

Home	Away	Third

The club released new Home and Away kits for the season, with the third kit being the away kit from the previous season.

Type	Shirt	Shorts	Socks	Info
Home	Maroon	Maroon	Maroon	Worn 27 times; against Cork City (LOI) (A), St Patrick's Athletic (LOI) (H), Shelbourne (LOI) (H), Derry City (LOI) (A), Waterford (LOI) (H), Shamrock Rovers (LOI) (H), Derry City (LOI) (H), Drogheda United (LOI) (H), Bohemians (LOI) (H), Sligo Rovers (LOI) (H), Cork City (LOI) (H), Shamrock Rovers (LOI) (A), Derry City (LOI) (A), St Patrick's Athletic (LOI) (H), Shelbourne (LOI) (H), Tolka Rovers (FAI) (H), Waterford (LOI) (H), Cork City (LOI) (A), Shamrock Rovers (LOI) (H), Salthill Devon (FAI) (A), Derry City (LOI) (H), Sligo Rovers (LOI) (H), Cork City (LOI) (H), Bohemians (LOI) (H), Drogheda United (LOI) (H), Shamrock Rovers (LOI) (A), Waterford (LOI) (A)
Away	Dark Blue	Dark Blue	Dark Blue	Worn 7 times; against Sligo Rovers (LOI) (A), Shelbourne (LOI) (A), St Patrick's Athletic (LOI) (A), Sligo Rovers (LOI) (A), Shelbourne (LOI) (A), St Patrick's Athletic (FAI) (A), St Patrick's Athletic (LOI) (A)
Third	White	Maroon	White	Worn 5 times; against Drogheda United (LOI) (A), Bohemians (LOI) (A), Waterford (LOI) (A), Drogheda United (LOI) (A), Bohemians (LOI) (A)

Key:
LOI=League of Ireland Premier Division
FAI=FAI Cup

== Competitions ==
=== League of Ireland Premier Division ===
==== League Table ====
Pos	Team	Pld	W	D	L	GF	GA	GD	Pts	Qualification or relegation
6	Drogheda United	36	12	15	9	38	38	0	51	
7	Sligo Rovers	36	11	8	17	42	54	−12	41	
8	Galway United	36	9	12	15	37	44	−7	39	
9	Waterford (O)	36	11	6	19	41	60	−19	39	Qualification for promotion/relegation play-off
10	Cork City (R)	36	4	12	20	33	61	−28	24	Relegation to League of Ireland First Division

Source: SSE Airtricity League, Soccerway
Rules for classification: 1) Points; 2) Goal difference; 3) Goals scored.
(O) Play-off winners; (R) Relegated

==== Results summary ====
Overall								Home						Away					
Pld	W	D	L	GF	GA	GD	Pts	W	D	L	GF	GA	GD	W	D	L	GF	GA	GD
36	9	12	15	37	44	−7	39	7	4	7	23	22	+1	2	8	8	14	22	−8

Last updated: 1 November 2025.

==== Results by round ====
Round	1	2	3	4	5	6	7	8	9	10	11	12	13	14	15	16	17	18	19	20	21	22	23	24	25	26	27	28	29	30	31	32	33	34	35	36
Ground	A	H	A	H	A	H	A	H	A	H	A	H	A	H	A	H	H	A	A	H	A	H	A	A	H	A	H	H	A	A	H	H	H	H	A	A
Result	D	W	D	D	D	W	W	L	W	L	D	W	L	L	L	L	W	D	D	W	L	D	L	L	L	L	D	L	L	D	L	W	W	D	L	D
Position	4	3	4	5	4	3	2	3	4	5	5	2	4	6	8	8	7	7	7	7	7	7	7	8	8	8	8	8	8	8	9	8	7	7	7	8

Updated to match(es) played on 1 November 2025. Source: 2025 League of Ireland Premier Division
A = Away; H = Home; W = Win; D = Draw; L = Loss

==== Matches ====
Win Draw Loss

14 February 2025 1	Cork City	2–2	Galway United	Turners Cross, Cork
19:45 GMT	Shipston (yellow card) 21'; Crowley (yellow card) 25'; Dijksteel 35'; Bolger 52'; Keating (yellow card) 57'; Lyons (yellow card) 59'; Nolan (yellow card) 62'	Report	Hickey (yellow card) 27' (goal) 45'; Cunningham (yellow card) 62'; Burns (yellow card) 66'; Borden 80'; Wilson (yellow card) 66'	Stadium: Turners Cross; Attendance: 5,031; Referee: Aaron O’Dowd

21 February 2025 2	Galway United	2–1	St Patrick's Athletic	Terryland, County Galway
19:45 GMT	Hickey 18', 25'; Dyer (yellow card) 70'; Slevin (yellow card) 75'; Tollett (yellow card) 87'; Wilson (yellow card) 87'	Report	Keena 30'; McLaughlin (yellow card) 45'	Stadium: Eamonn Deacy Park; Attendance: 4,231; Referee: Damien MacGraith
Note: Live on Virgin Media

28 February 2025 3	Drogheda United	1–1	Galway United	Drogheda, County Louth
19:45 GMT	Brennan 40'; Farrell (yellow card) 79'	Report	Brouder 76'; Cunningham (yellow card) 90+4'	Stadium: Sullivan and Lambe Park; Attendance: 2,161; Referee: Eoghan O'Shea

3 March 2025 4	Galway United	1–1	Shelbourne	Terryland, County Galway
19:45 GMT	Martin 58' (o.g.)	Report	Caffrey 52'	Stadium: Eamonn Deacy Park; Attendance: 3,449; Referee: Rob Hennessy

7 March 2025 5	Derry City	1–1	Galway United	Derry, Northern Ireland
19:45 GMT	O'Reilly (yellow card) 14'; Connolly (yellow card) 33'; Duffy 54'	Report	Dyer (yellow card) 27' (goal) 44'; Slevin (yellow card) 43'; Hickey (yellow card) 52'; Brouder (yellow card) 88'	Stadium: Ryan McBride Brandywell Stadium; Attendance: 2,990; Referee: Neil Doyle

14 March 2025 6	Galway United	1–0	Waterford	Terryland, County Galway
19:45 GMT	Brouder (yellow card) 46'; Borden 80'; Hickey (yellow card) 86'; Dyer (yellow card) 86'	Report	McMenamy (yellow card) 43'; Pouwels (yellow card) 77'	Stadium: Eamonn Deacy Park; Attendance: 2,828; Referee: Paul McLaughlin

28 March 2025 7	Bohemians	0–2	Galway United	Phibsborough, Dublin 7
19:45 GMT	Whelan (yellow card) 22'; Devoy (yellow card) 89'	Report	Dyer 19', 66' (yellow card) 90+4'; Cunningham (yellow card) 86'; Hurley (yellow card) 90+3'	Stadium: Dalymount Park; Attendance: 4,328; Referee: Damien MacGraith

4 April 2025 8	Galway United	0–1	Shamrock Rovers	Terryland, County Galway
19:45 GMT	Dyer (yellow card) 63'	Report	Grant (yellow card) 42'; Gaffney 48'	Stadium: Eamonn Deacy Park; Attendance: 4,323; Referee: Kevin O'Sullivan

12 April 2025 9	Sligo Rovers	1–2	Galway United	Sligo, County Sligo
19:45 GMT	Malley (yellow card) 35'; Reynolds (yellow card) 42'; Wolfe (yellow card) 48'; Elding (yellow card) 65' (goal) 72' (pen.); Manning (yellow card) 73'; Mahon (yellow card) 83'	Report	Byrne 21', 49'; Brouder (yellow card) 43'; Borden (yellow card) 90+4'	Stadium: The Showgrounds; Attendance: 2,786; Referee: Paul McLaughlin

18 April 2025 10	Galway United	2–3	Derry City	Terryland, County Galway
19:45 GMT	Byrne (yellow card) 20' (yellow-red card) 49'; Dyer (yellow card) 38'; Hickey 43'; Borden (yellow card) 51' (goal) 90+7'; Cunningham (yellow card) 73'; Walsh (yellow card) 79'	Report	Mullen 16' (yellow card) 57'; Duffy (yellow card) 37'; Benson 47'; Patton (yellow card) 81'; Whyte 90+4'	Stadium: Eamonn Deacy Park; Attendance: 2,216; Referee: Declan Toland

21 April 2025 11	Shelbourne	2–2	Galway United	Drumcondra, Dublin 3
17:00 GMT	Chapman 1'; Odubeko 67'	Report	Dyer 37', 81'; Brouder (yellow card) 46'; Kerrigan (yellow card) 89'	Stadium: Tolka Park; Attendance: 4,236; Referee: Paul Norton

25 April 2025 12	Galway United	2–1	Drogheda United	Terryland, County Galway
19:45 GMT	Walsh (yellow card) 63'; Dyer 68', 70'	Report	Markey 45+1'; James-Taylor (yellow card) 64'	Stadium: Eamonn Deacy Park; Attendance: Rob Hennessy; Referee: 3,537

2 May 2025 13	St Patrick's Athletic	2–0	Galway United	Inchicore, Dublin 8
19:45GMT	Leavy 32'; Elbouzedi 38'; Lennon (yellow card) 51'; Sjöberg (yellow card) 59' (yellow-red card) 69'; Melia (yellow card) 72'; Anang (yellow card) 90+4'	Report	Byrne (yellow card) 50'; Kerrigan (yellow card) 58'; Buckley (yellow card) 73'; Hurley (yellow card) 90+4'	Stadium: Richmond Park; Attendance: 4,709; Referee: Rob Harvey

5 May 2025 14	Galway United	1–2	Bohemians	Terryland, County Galway
17:00 GMT	Dyer 43'; Tollett (yellow card) 45'; Donelon (yellow card) 81'	Report	Clarke (yellow card) 43'; Grehan 59' 90+7'; Flores (yellow card) 67'	Stadium: Eamonn Deacy Park; Attendance: 3,316; Referee: Kevin O'Sullivan

9 May 2025 15	Waterford	1–0	Galway United	Waterford, County Waterford
19:45GMT	Leahy 27' (yellow card) 67'; Glenfield (yellow card) 36'; Radkowski (yellow card) 85'	Report	McCormack (yellow card) 56'; Slevin (yellow card) 65'; McCarthy (yellow card) 86'	Stadium: RSC; Attendance: 1,937; Referee: Paul Norton

16 May 2025 16	Galway United	0–1	Sligo Rovers	Terryland, County Galway
19:45GMT	Horgan (yellow card) 76'; Byrne (yellow card) 76'	Report	Hutchinson 69'; Wolfe (yellow card) 76'; Lomboto (yellow card) 85'; Hakiki (yellow card) 90+5'; Elding (yellow card) 90+6'	Stadium: Eamonn Deacy Park; Attendance: 2,542; Referee: Damien McGraith

23 May 2025 17	Galway United	2–1	Cork City	Terryland, County Galway
19:45GMT	Dyer 48'; Byrne (yellow card) 52'; Borden (yellow card) 66'; McCormack 84'	Report	O'Sullivan (yellow card) 19'; Mbeng (yellow card) 40'; Daniels 52' (pen.) (yellow card) 66'; Maguire (yellow card) 85'	Stadium: Eamonn Deacy Park; Attendance: 1,742; Referee: Mark Houlihan

30 May 2025 18	Shamrock Rovers	0–0	Galway United	Tallaght, Dublin 24
20:00GMT	Honohan (yellow card) 49'; Greene (yellow card) 90+1'	Report	McCarthy (yellow card) 63'; Buckley (yellow card) 70'	Stadium: Tallaght Stadium; Attendance: 6,204; Referee: Kevin O'Sullivan

13 June 2025 19	Derry City	1–1	Galway United	Derry, Northern Ireland
19:45GMT	Holt 18' (yellow card) 19'; Cann (yellow card) 73'; O'Reilly (yellow card) 88'	Report	Hurley 10' (pen.); Cunningham (yellow card) 44'; Borden (yellow card) 54'; Buckley (yellow card) 63'; Hickey (yellow card) 65'; Watts (yellow card) 89'	Stadium: Ryan McBride Brandywell Stadium; Attendance: 3,110; Referee: Declan Toland

20 June 2025 20	Galway United	3–1	St Patrick's Athletic	Terryland, County Galway
19:45 GMT	McCarthy 3'; Hurley 12'; Slevin 35'; McCormack (yellow card) 53'; Dyer (yellow card) 64'; Cunningham (yellow card) 76'; Hickey (yellow card) 90'	Report	Grivosti (yellow card) 9'; Power 34'; Keena (yellow card) 56'; Melia (yellow card) 76'	Stadium: Eamonn Deacy Park; Attendance: 2,109; Referee: Robert Harvey

23 June 2025 21	Sligo Rovers	2–1	Galway United	Sligo, County Sligo
19:45GMT	Hakiki 45'; Doyle-Hayes (yellow card) 53'; Mahon (red card) 53'; Elding (yellow card) 65'; Lomboto 73'	Report	Cunningham (yellow card) 35'; Dyer 47' (red card) 53'; Byrne (yellow card) 53'	Stadium: The Showgrounds; Attendance: 2,457; Referee: Neil Doyle

27 June 2025 22	Galway United	1–1	Shelbourne	Terryland, County Galway
19:45 GMT	Shaw (yellow card) 29'; Walsh (yellow card) 32'; Burns 84'; Clarke (yellow card) 90+5'	Report	Odubeko 25'; Kelly (yellow card) 33'; Wood (yellow card) 50'; Gannon (yellow card) 83'; Coyle (yellow card) 85'	Stadium: Eamonn Deacy Park; Attendance: 1,902; Referee: Kevin O'Sullivan

4 July 2025 23	Drogheda United	1–0	Galway United	Drogheda, County Louth
19:45GMT	Quinn (yellow card) 31'; Keeley (yellow card) 44'; Kareem 50'; Heeney (yellow card) 77'	Report	Buckley (yellow card) 6'; Shaw (yellow card) 52'	Stadium: Sullivan and Lambe Park; Attendance: 2,052; Referee: Damien McGraith

11 July 2025 24	Bohemians	3–0	Galway United	Phibsborough, Dublin 7
19:45GMT	Clarke (yellow card) 45+1' (goal) 61', 72'; James-Taylor 47'	Report		Stadium: Dalymount Park; Attendance: 4,151; Referee: Robert Harvey

25 July 2025 25	Galway United	2–4	Waterford	Terryland, County Galway
19:45 GMT	Walsh 59'; McGuinness 74'; Esua (yellow card) 78'; Hurley (yellow card) 90+5'; Cunningham (yellow card) 90+10'	Report	Rossiter (yellow card) 15'; Noonan 31'; Amond 47', 77' (pen.); Horton (yellow card) 58'; Leahy 72'; Dempsey (yellow card) 90+11'	Stadium: Eamonn Deacy Park; Attendance: 2,151; Referee: Alan Patchell

1 August 2025 26	Cork City	1–0	Galway United	Turners Cross, Cork
19:45GMT	Fitzpatrick 5'; Maguire (yellow card) 41'; Nolan (yellow card) 52'; Kiernan (yellow card) 54'; Kamara (yellow card) 85'; McLaughlin (yellow card) 88'		Hurley (yellow card) 64'; Slevin (yellow card) 90'	Stadium: Turners Cross; Attendance: 2,092; Referee: Aaron O'Dowd

10 August 2025 27	Galway United	0–0	Shamrock Rovers	Terryland, County Galway
17:00 GMT	Walsh (yellow card) 41'; Keohane (yellow card) 77'; Bolger (yellow card) 90+1'		Cleary (yellow card) 11'; Matthews (yellow card) 63'; McGovern (yellow card) 72'; Watts (yellow card) 83'	Stadium: Eamonn Deacy Park; Attendance: 2,312; Referee: Kevin O'Sullivan
Note: Match was originally scheduled for August 8, the game was moved due to Shamrock Rovers' participation in the UEFA Conference League

22 August 2025 28	Galway United	1–2	Derry City	Terryland, County Galway
19:45 GMT	Keohane 17' (yellow card) 67'; Burns (yellow card) 78'	Report	Stott (yellow card) 30' (yellow-red card) 86'; Akinyemi 43'; Winchester (yellow card) 67'; Diallo (yellow card) 90+1'; O'Reilly 90+3'	Stadium: Eamonn Deacy Park; Attendance: 1,759; Referee: Rob Hennessy

7 September 2025 29	Shelbourne	1–0	Galway United	Drumcondra, Dublin 3
17:00GMT	Caffrey (yellow card) 23'; Ledwidge (yellow card) 74'; Wood 78' (pen.) (yellow card) 90+6'	Report	Slevin (yellow card) 24'	Stadium: Tolka Park; Attendance: 3,971; Referee: Neil Doyle
Note: Match was originally scheduled for August 29; the game was moved to August 31 due to Shelbourne's participation in the UEFA Conference League. The game was rescheduled again to September 7 due to the previous date falling on the same day as the funeral of former Galway United assistant manager, Ollie Horgan.

19 September 2025 30	St Patrick's Athletic	1–1	Galway United	Inchicore, Dublin 8
19:45GMT	McClelland 72'; Garrick (yellow card) 73'; Sjöberg (yellow card) 90+2'; Redmond (yellow card) 90+5'	Report	McCarthy (yellow card) 54'; Hurley 61' (pen.) (red card) 90+5'; Slevin (yellow card) 73'; Bolger (yellow card) 86'; Burns (yellow card) 89'; Horgan (yellow card) 90+5'	Stadium: Richmond Park; Referee: Rob Harvey
Note: Live on Virgin Media

22 September 2025 31	Galway United	0–1	Sligo Rovers	Terryland, County Galway
19:45 GMT	Hickey (yellow card) 51'; Buckley (yellow card) 79'; Borden (yellow card) 90+5'	Report	McElroy (yellow card) 20'; Kavanagh 54', (yellow card) 79'; Harkin (yellow card) 73'; Sargeant (yellow card) 86'	Stadium: Eamonn Deacy Park; Referee: Paul Norton
Note: Match was originally scheduled for September 12, the game was moved due to both teams' participation in the FAI Cup Quarter-Final

26 September 2025 32	Galway United	2–1	Cork City	Terryland, County Galway
19:45 GMT	Walsh 19', 45+1'; Burns (yellow card) 46'; Bolger (yellow card) 60'	Report	Nolan 42'; Brann (yellow card) 60'; Maguire (yellow card) 75'; Feely (yellow card) 90+2'	Stadium: Eamonn Deacy Park; Attendance: 1,881; Referee: Rob Hennessy

17 October 2025 33	Galway United	2–0	Bohemians	Terryland, County Galway
19:45 GMT	Hurley (yellow card) 17' (goal) 59' (pen.); Walsh (yellow card) 20'; Hickey 36'; McCarthy (yellow card) 72'	Report	Buckley (yellow card) 78'	Stadium: Eamonn Deacy Park; Attendance: 2,622; Referee: Rob Harvey

24 October 2025 34	Galway United	1–1	Drogheda United	Terryland, County Galway
19:45 GMT	Keohane (yellow card) 12'; Bolger (yellow card) 51'; Walsh 56'	Report	Heeney 49'; Keeley (yellow card) 56'	Stadium: Eamonn Deacy Park; Attendance: 2,774; Referee: Kevin O'Sullivan

29 October 2025 35	Shamrock Rovers	1–0	Galway United	Tallaght, Dublin 24
20:00GMT	Watts 75'	Report	Brouder (yellow card) 74'	Stadium: Tallaght Stadium; Attendance: 5,279; Referee: Aaron O'Dowd
Note: Match was originally scheduled for October 3, the game was moved due to Shamrock Rovers' participation in the UEFA Conference League

1 November 2025 36	Waterford	1–1	Galway United	Waterford, County Waterford
19:45 GMT	Amond 38'	Report	Walsh 16'; Burns (yellow card) 74'; Bolger (yellow card) 83'	Stadium: RSC; Attendance: 3,211; Referee: Paul McLaughlin

=== FAI Cup ===
Win Draw Loss

==== Second Round ====
18 July 2025 Second Round	Galway United	2–0	Tolka Rovers	Terryland, County Galway
19:45 GMT	Walsh 18'; Hurley 74'	Report		Stadium: Eamonn Deacy Park; Attendance: 1,033; Referee: Ryan Maher

==== Third Round ====
15 August 2025 Third Round	Salthill Devon	0–4	Galway United	Terryland, County Galway
19:45 GMT	Curran (yellow card) 52'; Molloy (yellow card) 62'	Report	Buckley 11'; Burns (yellow card) 32'; Walsh 36'; Hickey (yellow card) 41' (goal) 66'; McGuinness 90+1'	Stadium: Eamonn Deacy Park; Attendance: 2,507; Referee: Paul Norton
Note: Salthill Devon were drawn as the home team but both clubs agreed to switch the venue to Galway United's home ground.

==== Quarter-Final ====
14 September 2025 Quarter-Final	St Patrick's Athletic	3–1 (a.e.t.)	Galway United	Inchicore, Dublin 8
18:00 GMT	Forrester (yellow card) 32' (goal) 105'; Melia (yellow card) 45'; Mulraney 83'; Sjöberg (yellow card) 89'; Garrick 115'	Report	Bolger (yellow card) 33'; Hurley 90'; McCormack (yellow card) 95'; Sivi (yellow card) 96'; Borden (yellow card) 103'; Brouder (red card) 104'	Stadium: Richmond Park; Referee: Paul Mcglaughlin
Note: Game broadcast live on RTÉ2

=== Friendlies ===
Win Draw Loss

==== Pre-season Friendlies ====
10 January 2025	Treaty United	1–1	Galway United	Ennis, County Clare
19:00 GMT	Trialist 68'		Tollett 19'	Stadium: Frank Healy Park

17 January 2025	UCD	0–1	Galway United	Belfield, Dublin 4
16:00 GMT			Walsh 33'	Stadium: UCD Bowl

25 January 2025	Sligo Rovers	2–2 (5–4 p)	Galway United	Westport, County Mayo
14:00 GMT	Kavanagh 40' 53' (pen.)		Kerrigan 29'; Walsh 82'	Stadium: United Park

27 January 2025	Juventud de Torremolinos	0–3	Galway United	Marbella, Spain
14:00 GMT			Hurley 20' (pen.); Walsh 25'; Borden 75'	Stadium: Municipal San Pedro Alcántara

30 January 2025	UD San Pedro	0–2	Galway United	Marbella, Spain
14:00 GMT			Hickey 30'; Keohane 80'	Stadium: Municipal San Pedro Alcántara

7 February 2025	Longford Town	0–6	Galway United	Longford, County Longford
19:45 GMT			Hickey 5'; Hurley 23' 75'; Dyer 26'; Keohane 65' 67'	Stadium: Bishopsgate

9 February 2025	Galway United	3–1	PSC Academy	Terryland, County Galway
19:45 GMT	Wilson 37'; Kavanagh 57'; Trialist 81'		Ferrer 51'	Stadium: Eamon Deacy Park

==== Stephen Walsh Testimonial ====
15 November 2025	Galway United Legends XI	7–4	Galway FA Legends XI	Terryland, County Galway
14:00 GMT				Stadium: Eamon Deacy Park

== Statistics ==
=== Player of the month ===
==== Galway United POTM ====
Awarded monthly to the player that was chosen by members of Galway United Co Op

Month	Player	Ref.
February	(United States) Patrick Hickey	
March	(New Zealand) Moses Dyer	
April	(Cameroon) Jeannot Esua	
May	(Republic of Ireland) Rob Slevin	
June	(Wales) Evan Watts	
July	(Republic of Ireland) David Hurley	
August	(Republic of Ireland) Jimmy Keohane	
September	(Republic of Ireland) Stephen Walsh	
October/November (Note: October and November were combined in to one due to the club only playing one game in the month of November.)	(Republic of Ireland) Stephen Walsh	

==== League of Ireland POTM ====
Month	Player	Ref.
April	(New Zealand) Moses Dyer	

=== Appearances and goals ===
This table shows all of the players who have featured in a first team squad for Galway United this season
Brackets denotes appearances made as a substitute

No.	Pos.	Player	League		FAI Cup		Total	
No.	Pos.	Player	Apps	Goals	Apps	Goals	Apps	Goals
1	GK	(Republic of Ireland) Brendan Clarke	20	0	1	0	21	0
2	DF	(Republic of Ireland) Cian Byrne	18(2)	2	0	0	18	2
3	DF	(Republic of Ireland) Regan Donelon	12(10)	0	2(2)	0	14	0
4	DF	(Republic of Ireland) Rob Slevin	36(3)	1	3(1)	0	39	1
5	DF	(Republic of Ireland) Killian Brouder	34(7)	1	3	0	37	1
6	MF	(England) Axel Piesold	10(9)	0	3(1)	0	13	0
7	FW	(Republic of Ireland) Stephen Walsh	36(15)	5	3(1)	2	39	7
8	DF	(Republic of Ireland) Greg Cunningham	22	0	1	0	23	0
9	FW	(New Zealand) Moses Dyer	20(1)	10	0	0	20	10
10	MF	(Republic of Ireland) David Hurley	34(8)	4	3(1)	2	37	6
11	MF	(Australia) Daniel Stynes	0	0	0	0	0	0
11	FW	(Trinidad and Tobago) Malcolm Shaw	7(3)	0	3(2)	0	10	0
12	MF	(Republic of Ireland) Sean Kerrigan	9(9)	0	0	0	9	0
14	MF	(England) Jeremy Sivi	8(7)	0	2(2)	0	10	0
15	MF	(United States) Patrick Hickey	32(1)	5	2	1	34	6
16	GK	(Wales) Evan Watts	16	0	2	0	18	0
17	MF	(United States) Vincent Borden	25(9)	3	1(1)	0	26	3
18	DF	(Northern Ireland) Bobby Burns	33(6)	1	3	0	36	1
19	FW	(Northern Ireland) Max Wilson	3(3)	0	0	0	3	0
20	MF	(Republic of Ireland) Jimmy Keohane	23(4)	1	2	0	25	1
21	DF	(Republic of Ireland) Colm Horgan	11(8)	0	1	0	12	0
22	MF	(Republic of Ireland) Conor McCormack	11(9)	1	1	0	12	1
24	MF	(Republic of Ireland) Ed McCarthy	25(8)	1	2	0	27	1
26	DF	(Republic of Ireland) Garry Buckley	24(3)	0	2	1	26	1
27	FW	(Republic of Ireland) Dara McGuinness	10(3)	1	2(1)	1	12	2
28	FW	(Republic of Ireland) Brian Cunningham	1(1)	0	0	0	1	0
29	FW	(Republic of Ireland) Cillian Tollett	10(8)	0	1(1)	0	11	0
31	MF	(Republic of Ireland) Donnacha Sammon	0	0	1(1)	0	1	0
32	GK	(Bermuda) Andrew Kempe	0	0	0	0	0	0
33	DF	(Cameroon) Jeannot Esua	34	0	2	0	36	0
34	MF	(Republic of Ireland) Aaron Bolger	14(5)	0	3(1)	0	17	0
35	MF	(Republic of Ireland) Junior Thiam	1(1)	0	1(1)	0	2	0
39	DF	(Republic of Ireland) Billy Regan	0	0	0	0	0	0
40	GK	(Republic of Ireland) MacDara Scanlon	0	0	0	0	0	0

=== Clean sheets ===
No.	Player	League	FAI Cup	Total		
No.	Player	1	(Republic of Ireland) Brendan Clarke	2	0	2
16	(Wales) Evan Watts	3	2	5		

=== Disciplinary record ===
No.	Player	League			FAI Cup			Total		
No.	Player	Yellow card	(yellow card) (yellow-red card)	Red card	Yellow card	(yellow card) (yellow-red card)	Red card	Yellow card	(yellow card) (yellow-red card)	Red card
8	Greg Cunningham	9	0	0	0	0	0	9	0	0
9	Moses Dyer	7	0	1	0	0	0	7	0	1
15	Patrick Hickey	6	0	0	1	0	0	7	0	0
17	Vincent Borden	5	0	0	1	0	0	6	0	0
18	Bobby Burns	5	0	0	1	0	0	6	0	0
34	Aaron Bolger	5	0	0	1	0	0	6	0	0
5	Killian Brouder	5	0	0	0	0	1	5	0	1
10	David Hurley	5	0	1	0	0	0	5	0	1
4	Rob Slevin	5	0	0	0	0	0	5	0	0
7	Stephen Walsh	5	0	0	0	0	0	5	0	0
26	Garry Buckley	5	0	0	0	0	0	5	0	0
2	Cian Byrne	4	1	0	0	0	0	4	1	0
24	Ed McCarthy	4	0	0	0	0	0	4	0	0
20	Jimmy Keohane	3	0	0	0	0	0	3	0	0
22	Conor McCormack	2	0	0	1	0	0	3	0	0
11	Malcolm Shaw	2	0	0	0	0	0	2	0	0
12	Sean Kerrigan	2	0	0	0	0	0	2	0	0
19	Max Wilson	2	0	0	0	0	0	2	0	0
29	Cillian Tollett	2	0	0	0	0	0	2	0	0
1	Brendan Clarke	1	0	0	0	0	0	1	0	0
3	Regan Donelon	1	0	0	0	0	0	1	0	0
14	Jeremy Sivi	0	0	0	1	0	0	1	0	0
16	Evan Watts	1	0	0	0	0	0	1	0	0
21	Colm Horgan	1	0	0	0	0	0	1	0	0
33	Jeannot Esua	1	0	0	0	0	0	1	0	0
Totals		73	1	2	5	0	1	78	1	3

=== Captains ===
No.	Pos.	Player	No. Games	Notes
8	DF	(Republic of Ireland) Greg Cunningham	23	Captain
1	GK	(Republic of Ireland) Brendan Clarke	6	
20	MF	(Republic of Ireland) Jimmy Keohane	5	
22	MF	(Republic of Ireland) Conor McCormack	2	
5	DF	(Republic of Ireland) Killian Brouder	1	
7	FW	(Republic of Ireland) Stephen Walsh	1	
10	MF	(Republic of Ireland) David Hurley	1	

== International call-ups ==
=== Wales Under 21 National Team ===
Player	Fixture	Date	Location	Event
Evan Watts	vs. Andorra	20 March 2025	Valencia, Spain	Friendly
Evan Watts	vs. Sweden	23 March 2025	Valencia, Spain	Friendly
Evan Watts	vs. Norway	6 June 2025	Málaga, Spain	Friendly
Evan Watts	vs. Denmark	8 September 2025	Rodney Parade, Newport	2027 UEFA European Under-21 Championship qualification

=== Republic of Ireland Under 17 National Team ===
Player	Fixture	Date	Location	Event
Cillian Tollett	vs. Finland	12 February 2025	Oliva, Spain	Friendly
Cillian Tollett	vs. Hungary	15 February 2025	Oliva, Spain	Friendly
Cillian Tollett	vs. Belgium	19 March 2025	Gryfice, Poland	2025 UEFA European Under-17 Championship qualification
Cillian Tollett	vs. Poland	22 March 2025	Koszalin, Poland	2025 UEFA European Under-17 Championship qualification
Cillian Tollett	vs. Norway	4 June 2025	Kotoriba, Croatia	Friendly
Cillian Tollett	vs. Turkey	7 June 2025	Kotoriba, Croatia	Friendly
Cillian Tollett	vs. Croatia	9 June 2025	Ludbreg, Croatia	Friendly
