= Regan Donelon =

Irish footballer

Personal information
- Date of birth: 17 April 1996 (age 30)
- Place of birth: Manchester, England
- Height: 1.71 m (5 ft 7 in)
- Positions: Left-back; midfielder

Team information
- Current team: Dunmore Town

Youth career
- –2007: Dunmore Town
- 2007–2012: Shelbourne
- 2012–2013: Stella Maris
- 2013–2014: Sligo Rovers

Senior career*
Years	Team	Apps	(Gls)
2014–2021	Sligo Rovers	132	(2)
2015	→ Finn Harps (loan)	10	(0)
2022	Finn Harps	25	(0)
2023–2025	Galway United	48	(0)
2026–	Dunmore Town		

International career
- Republic of Ireland U19
- * Club domestic league appearances and goals

Regan Donelon (born 17 April 1996) is an Irish footballer who plays as a left-back for Roscommon & District League club Dunmore Town.

Donelon is best known for his time in the League of Ireland with him spending 7 seven years with Sligo Rovers, as well as two spells with Finn Harps and a stint with Galway United.

== Early life ==
Donelon was born in Manchester, England and grew up in Dunmore, County Galway.

== Youth career ==
Donelon played youth football with Dunmore Town before being signed by Shelbourne at U12 level. He would also go on to play for Stella Maris be for signing for Sligo Rovers U19s.

== Career ==
=== Sligo Rovers ===
On 17 May 2014, Donelon made his professional debut for League of Ireland Premier Division club Sligo Rovers, coming on as a substitute in a 3–0 win over Bray Wanderers. On 27 July 2014, Donelon made his first start for Sligo in the same game as fellow Galwegian Ruairí Keating.

==== Finn Harps (loan) ====
Donelon joined League of Ireland First Division club Finn Harps on loan ahead of the 2015 season along with teammate Ruairí Keating.

==== Return from loan ====
Donelon returned for the second half of Sligo's 2015 season, helping them survive in the Premier Division by just two points. On 10 October 2017, he scored his first ever goal for Sligo, scoring a free-kick to earn a 1–1 draw away against Shamrock Rovers.

During the 2019 FAI Cup, Donelon scored in the First Round against Glebe North, in the Second Round against Limerick and in the Quarter-finals against UCD. On 22 August 2020, he scored in a 3–1 over Dundalk, scoring his first league goal at The Showgrounds six and a half years after joining the club.

On 15 July 2021, Donelon featured for Sligo in the Europa Conference League, as he started in their First qualifying round match against Icelandic side FH. On 1 December 2021, he confirmed his departure from Sligo Rovers after 8 eight seasons with the club.

=== Finn Harps ===
On 15 January 2022, Donelon made a return to League of Ireland First Division side Finn Harps, this time on a permanent move.

=== Galway United ===
On 15 December 2022, Donelon signed with fellow First Division club Galway United, following his former Finn Harps boss Ollie Horgan who had just become United's assistant manager. In his first season with the club Donelon played 23 games as Galway won the league by 25 points.

On 3 March 2025, Donelon put in a cross which caused a John Martin own goal which helped Galway pick up a draw against the reigning champions Shelbourne at Eamonn Deacy Park. On 23 November 2025, Galway announced Donelon's departure from the club alongside teammates, Vincent Borden, Jeremy Sivi and Bobby Burns.

== Career statistics ==
=== Club ===
Appearances and goals by club, season and competition
Club	Season	League			National cup (Note: Includes FAI Cup)		League cup (Note: Includes League of Ireland Cup)		Continental		Other		Total	
Club	Season	Division	Apps	Goals	Apps	Goals	Apps	Goals	Apps	Goals	Apps	Goals	Apps	Goals
Finn Harps (loan)	2015	LOI First Division	10	0	0	0	0	0	—		0	0	10	0
Sligo Rovers	2014	LOI Premier Division	8	0	0	0	0	0	0 (Note: Appearances in UEFA Europa League)	0	0	0	8	0
Sligo Rovers	2015	LOI Premier Division	13	0	2	0	0	0	—		—		15	0
Sligo Rovers	2016	LOI Premier Division	20	0	0	0	1	0	—		—		21	0
Sligo Rovers	2017	LOI Premier Division	26	1	1	0	2	0	—		1 (Note: Appearance(s) in Scottish Challenge Cup)	0	30	1
Sligo Rovers	2018	LOI Premier Division	19	0	1	0	2	0	—		2	0	24	0
Sligo Rovers	2019	LOI Premier Division	24	0	4	3	1	0	—		—		26	3
Sligo Rovers	2020	LOI Premier Division	12	1	1	0	—		—		—		13	1
Sligo Rovers	2021	LOI Premier Division	10	0	1	0	—		1 (Note: Appearance in UEFA Europa Conference League)	0	—		12	0
Sligo Rovers	Total		132	2	10	3	6	0	1	0	3	0	152	5
Finn Harps	2022	LOI First Division	25	0	0	0	—		—		—		25	0
Galway United	2023	First Division	23	0	2	0	—		—		—		25	0
Galway United	2024	LOI Premier Division	13	0	0	0	—		—		—		13	0
Galway United	2025	LOI Premier Division	12	0	2	0	—		—		—		14	0
Galway United	Total		48	0	4	0	0	0	0	0	0	0	52	0
Career total			235	2	14	0	6	0	1	0	3	0	239	5

== Honours ==
Galway United

- League of Ireland First Division: 2023
