= 2024 Galway United F.C. season =

Irish football club season

Galway United
2024 season
- Manager: John Caulfield
- Stadium: Eamonn Deacy Park
- Premier Division: 5th
- FAI Cup: Round of 16
- Top goalscorer: Stephen Walsh (9)
- Highest home attendance: 4,323; 2–2 v Sligo Rovers; 25 October 2024 (Premier Dvision)
- Lowest home attendance: 1,204; 6–0 v Longford Town; 19 July 2024 (FAI Cup)
- Biggest win: 6–0 v Longford Town; 19 July 2024 (Home, FAI Cup)
Home colours	Away colours	Third colours

The 2024 Galway United F.C. season was the football club's 46th season in the League of Ireland and their first season back in the League of Ireland Premier Division after gaining promotion in 2023.

The club finished the season in 5th. The club also made it to the Round of 16 of the FAI Cup before being Knocked out by Shelbourne.

== Squad ==
#	Name	Nationality	Position	Date of birth (age) (Note: Age shown displays players’ age at the end of the season. For players who departed before the end of the season, age shown is age at time of departure.)	Previous Club	Signed	Notes
Goalkeepers
1	Brendan Clarke	(Republic of Ireland)	GK	September 17, 1985 (aged 39)	(Republic of Ireland) Shelbourne	2023	
16	Jack Brady	(Republic of Ireland)	GK	December 17, 1996 (aged 27)	(Republic of Ireland) Longford Town	2024	
40	Kieran McDonagh	(Republic of Ireland)	GK	April 5, 2005 (aged 19)	(Republic of Ireland) Academy	2023	
Defenders
2	Conor O'Keeffe	(Republic of Ireland)	DF	September 19, 1993 (aged 31)	(Northern Ireland) Newry City	2021	
3	Regan Donelon	(Republic of Ireland)	DF	April 17, 1996 (aged 28)	(Republic of Ireland) Finn Harps	2023	
4	Rob Slevin	(Republic of Ireland)	DF	July 14, 1998 (aged 26)	(Republic of Ireland) Finn Harps	2023	
5	Killian Brouder	(Republic of Ireland)	DF	August 20, 1998 (aged 26)	(Republic of Ireland) Limerick	2019	
6	Maurice Nugent	(Republic of Ireland)	DF	July 30, 1998 (aged 26)	(England) Uxbridge	2023	
8	Greg Cunningham	(Republic of Ireland)	DF	January 31, 1991 (aged 33)	(England) Preston North End	2024	
14	Billy Regan	(Republic of Ireland)	DF	October 22, 2007 (aged 17)	(Republic of Ireland) Galway United U20	2024	
21	Colm Horgan	(Republic of Ireland)	DF	July 2, 1994 (aged 30)	(Republic of Ireland) Sligo Rovers	2023	
26	Garry Buckley	(Republic of Ireland)	DF	August 19, 1993 (aged 31)	(Republic of Ireland) Sligo Rovers	2024	
33	Jeannot Esua	(Cameroon)	DF	August 6, 1996 (aged 28)	(Finland) Ekenäs IF	2024	
Midfielders
10	David Hurley	(Republic of Ireland)	MF	October 21, 1998 (aged 26)	(Republic of Ireland) Cobh Ramblers	2021	
11	Karl O'Sullivan	(Republic of Ireland)	MF	October 31, 1999 (aged 25)	(Republic of Ireland) Sligo Rovers	2024	
15	Patrick Hickey	(United States)	MF	July 2, 1998 (aged 26)	(Republic of Ireland) Athlone Town	2024	
17	Vincent Borden	(United States)	MF	February 21, 1999 (aged 25)	(Slovenia) Rudar Velenje	2023	
18	Bobby Burns	(Northern Ireland)	MF	October 7, 1999 (aged 25)	(Northern Ireland) Glentoran	2024	
20	Jimmy Keohane	(Republic of Ireland)	MF	January 22, 1991 (aged 33)	(England) Rochdale	2024	
22	Conor McCormack	(Republic of Ireland)	MF	May 18, 1990 (aged 34)	(Republic of Ireland) Derry City	2021	Captain
24	Ed McCarthy	(Republic of Ireland)	MF	April 20, 2001 (aged 23)	(Republic of Ireland) Regional United	2022	
Forwards
7	Stephen Walsh	(Republic of Ireland)	FW	August 29, 1990 (aged 34)	(Republic of Ireland) Galway Hibernians	2018	
9	Junior Ogedi-Uzokwe	(England)	FW	April 3, 1994 (aged 30)	(Northern Ireland) Glentoran	2024	
19	Francely Lomboto	(Republic of Ireland)	FW	July 2, 2000 (aged 24)	(Republic of Ireland) Galway Hibernians	2020	
27	Kyle Fitzgerald	(Republic of Ireland)	FW	January 28, 2007 (aged 17)	(Republic of Ireland) Academy	2024	
28	Brian Cunningham	(Republic of Ireland)	FW	September 3, 2006 (aged 18)	(Republic of Ireland) Academy	2023	
29	Cillian Tollett	(Republic of Ireland)	FW	February 9, 2008 (aged 16)	(Republic of Ireland) Academy	2024	
Players who departed before the end of the season
8	Aodh Dervin	(Republic of Ireland)	MF	July 21, 1999 (aged 24)	(Republic of Ireland) Shelbourne	2023	
9	Wassim Aouachria	(Algeria)	FW	May 12, 2000 (aged 24)	(Republic of Ireland) Waterford	2023	
12	Leo Gaxha	(Albania)	FW	July 27, 2002 (aged 21)	(Republic of Ireland) Kerry	2024	
16	Joe Wright	(England)	GK	April 10, 2004 (aged 20)	(England) Millwall	2024	
20	Tom Costello	(England)	FW	February 23, 2003 (aged 21)	(England) Coventry City	2024	
30	Al-Amin Kazeem	(England)	DF	April 6, 2002 (aged 22)	(England) Colchester United	2024	Loan

=== Transfers ===
==== In ====
Date	Position	Nationality	Name	Last club	Ref.
12 December 2023	DF	(Republic of Ireland)	Garry Buckley	(Republic of Ireland) Sligo Rovers	
20 December 2023	FW	(Albania)	Leo Gaxha	(Republic of Ireland) Kerry	
22 December 2023	MF	(United States)	Patrick Hickey	(Republic of Ireland) Athlone Town	
4 January 2024	MF	(Republic of Ireland)	Karl O'Sullivan	(Republic of Ireland) Sligo Rovers	
16 January 2024	DF	(Cameroon)	Jeannot Esua	(Finland) Ekenäs IF	
22 January 2024	GK	(England)	Joe Wright	(England) Millwall	
1 February 2024	FW	(England)	Tom Costello	(England) Coventry City	
26 June 2024	MF	(Northern Ireland)	Bobby Burns	(Northern Ireland) Glentoran	
1 July 2024	FW	(England)	Junior Ogedi-Uzokwe	(Northern Ireland) Glentoran	
1 July 2024	MF	(Republic of Ireland)	Jimmy Keohane	(England) Rochdale	
17 July 2024	DF	(Republic of Ireland)	Greg Cunningham	(England) Preston North End	
18 July 2024	GK	(Republic of Ireland)	Jack Brady	(Republic of Ireland) Longford Town	

==== Out ====
Date	Position	Nationality	Name	To	Ref.
13 December 2023	FW	(Republic of Ireland)	Darren Clarke	(Northern Ireland) Glenavon	
18 December 2023	FW	(Republic of Ireland)	Mikie Rowe	(Republic of Ireland) Wexford	
18 December 2023	FW	(Republic of Ireland)	Wilson Waweru	(Republic of Ireland) Sligo Rovers	
22 December 2023	DF	(Republic of Ireland)	Evan O'Connor	(Republic of Ireland) Treaty United	
29 December 2023	DF	(Republic of Ireland)	Oisín O'Reilly	(Republic of Ireland) Treaty United	
13 January 2024	FW	(Republic of Ireland)	Rob Manley	(Republic of Ireland) Home Farm	
18 January 2024	GK	(England)	Alex Rutter	(Northern Ireland) H&W Welders	
18 June 2024	FW	(England)	Tom Costello	(England) Wigan Athletic	
23 June 2024	FW	(Algeria)	Wassim Aouachria	(Northern Ireland) Glentoran	
17 July 2024	FW	(Albania)	Leo Gaxha	(Republic of Ireland) Athlone Town	
17 July 2024	MF	(Republic of Ireland)	Aodh Dervin	(Republic of Ireland) Dundalk	
19 July 2024	GK	(England)	Joe Wright	(England) Eastbourne Borough	

==== Loan In ====
Date	Position	Nationality	Name	From	Date until	Ref.
8 February 2024	DF	(England)	Al-Amin Kazeem	(England) Colchester United	31 June 2024	

==== Loan Out ====
Date	Position	Nationality	Name	To	Date until	Ref.
8 January 2024	MF	(Republic of Ireland)	Steven Healy	(Republic of Ireland) Kerry	1 November 2024	
8 January 2024	DF	(Republic of Ireland)	Daire McCarthy	(Republic of Ireland) Kerry	1 November 2024	
8 January 2024	FW	(Republic of Ireland)	David Tarmey	(Republic of Ireland) Treaty United	1 November 2024	

== Club ==
=== Coaching staff ===
- Manager: John Caulfield
- Assistant Manager: Ollie Horgan
- Goalkeeping Coach: Gianluca Aimi
- Strength and Conditioning Coach: Danny Broderick
- Physiotherapist: Richard Grier
- Analyst: Robert Crosbie
- Kitman: Darra Hislop

== Competitions ==
=== League of Ireland Premier Division ===
==== League Table ====
Pos	Team	Pld	W	D	L	GF	GA	GD	Pts	Qualification or relegation
3	St Patrick's Athletic	36	17	8	11	51	37	+14	59	Qualification for Conference League first qualifying round
4	Derry City	36	14	13	9	48	31	+17	55	
5	Galway United	36	13	13	10	33	29	+4	52	
6	Sligo Rovers	36	13	10	13	40	51	−11	49	
7	Waterford	36	13	6	17	43	47	−4	45	

Source: SSE Airtricity League, Soccerway
Rules for classification: 1) Points; 2) Goal difference; 3) Goals scored.

==== Results summary ====
Overall								Home						Away					
Pld	W	D	L	GF	GA	GD	Pts	W	D	L	GF	GA	GD	W	D	L	GF	GA	GD
36	13	13	10	33	29	+4	52	7	7	4	17	12	+5	6	6	6	16	17	−1

Last updated: 1 November 2024.

==== Results by round ====
Round	1	2	3	4	5	6	7	8	9	10	11	12	13	14	15	16	17	18	19	20	21	22	23	24	25	26	27	28	29	30	31	32	33	34	35	36
Ground	H	A	H	A	H	H	A	H	A	A	H	A	H	A	H	A	H	A	H	A	H	A	H	H	A	A	H	A	H	A	H	A	H	A	H	A
Result	L	W	W	L	D	L	W	L	D	D	W	D	D	W	D	W	W	L	L	W	L	D	W	L	W	D	D	W	L	D	W	W	D	L	D	D
Position	10	5	4	5	4	7	5	7	8	8	6	5	6	4	5	4	3	5	5	5	5	5	5	6	5	6	6	5	5	5	4	4	5	5	5	5

Updated to match(es) played on 1 November 2024. Source: 2024 League of Ireland Premier Division
A = Away; H = Home; W = Win; D = Draw; L = Loss

==== Matches ====
Win Draw Loss

16 February 2024 1	Galway United	0–1	St Patrick's Athletic	Terryland, County Galway
19:45 GMT	Walsh (red card) 79'	Report	Lennon 3'	Stadium: Eamonn Deacy Park; Attendance: 4,094; Referee: Eoghan O'Shea

23 February 2024 2	Dundalk	0–2	Galway United	Dundalk, County Louth
19:45 GMT		Report	McCarthy 11'; Dervin 30'	Stadium: Oriel Park; Attendance: 3,122; Referee: Gavin Colfer

1 March 2024 3	Galway United	2–1	Waterford	Terryland, County Galway
19:45 GMT	Borden 48'; Hurley 79'	Report	Amond 19'	Stadium: Eamonn Deacy Park; Attendance: 3,011; Referee: Alan Patchell

4 March 2024 4	Shelbourne	1–0	Galway United	Drumcondra, Dublin 3
19:45 GMT	Martin 15'	Report		Stadium: Tolka Park; Attendance: 3,733; Referee: Rob Hennessy

8 March 2024 5	Galway United	0–0	Drogheda United	Terryland, County Galway
19:45 GMT		Report		Stadium: Eamonn Deacy Park; Attendance: 3,475; Referee: David Dunne

15 March 2024 6	Galway United	0–1	Shamrock Rovers	Terryland, County Galway
19:45 GMT		Report	Kenny 85'	Stadium: Eamonn Deacy Park; Attendance: 4,132; Referee: Paul McLaughlin

29 March 2024 7	Derry City	0–1	Galway United	Derry, Northern Ireland
19:45 GMT		Report	Walsh 86'	Stadium: Ryan McBride Brandywell Stadium; Attendance: 3,115; Referee: Declan Toland

1 April 2024 8	Galway United	0–2	Bohemians	Terryland, County Galway
19:45 GMT		Report	Mills 22'; Akintunde 57'	Stadium: Eamonn Deacy Park; Attendance: 3,538; Referee: Gavin Colfer

12 April 2024 9	Waterford	0–0	Galway United	Waterford, County Waterford
19:45 GMT	Burke (yellow card) 22' (yellow-red card) 89'	Report		Stadium: RSC; Attendance: 2,537; Referee: Paul Norton

19 April 2024 10	Galway United	1–0	Shelbourne	Terryland, County Galway
19:45 GMT	McCarthy 22'	Report		Stadium: Eamonn Deacy Park; Attendance: 2,311; Referee: Damien Macgraith

22 April 2024 11	Sligo Rovers	0–0	Galway United	Sligo, County Sligo
19:45 GMT		Report		Stadium: The Showgrounds; Attendance: 2,627; Referee: Eoghan O'Shea

26 April 2024 12	Shamrock Rovers	1–1	Galway United	Tallaght, Dublin 24
19:45 GMT	Watts (penalty missed) 48'; Kenny 84'	Report	Walsh 55'	Stadium: Tallaght Stadium; Attendance: 5,629; Referee: David Dunne

3 May 2024 13	Galway United	0–0	Derry City	Terryland, County Galway
19:45 GMT		Report		Stadium: Eamonn Deacy Park; Attendance: 2,213; Referee: Rob Hennessy

6 May 2024 14	Bohemians	0–1	Galway United	Phibsborough, Dublin 7
19:45 GMT		Report	Nugent 19'; O'Sullivan (yellow card) 39' (yellow-red card) 59'	Stadium: Dalymount Park; Attendance: 4,101; Referee: Paul Norton

10 May 2024 15	Galway United	0–0	Sligo Rovers	Terryland, County Galway
19:45 GMT		Report		Stadium: Eamonn Deacy Park; Attendance: 2,912; Referee: Damien Macgraith

17 May 2024 16	Drogheda United	2–3	Galway United	Drogheda, County Louth
19:45 GMT	Weir 24'; Bawa 74'	Report	Slevin 5'; Nugent 90+1'; Walsh 90+5'	Stadium: Sullivan and Lambe Park; Attendance: 1,697; Referee: Declan Toland

24 May 2024 17	Galway United	2–0	Dundalk	Terryland, County Galway
19:45 GMT	Nugent 72'	Report	Munro 1' (o.g.)	Stadium: Eamonn Deacy Park; Attendance: 2,302; Referee: Mark Houlihan

31 May 2024 18	St Patrick's Athletic	2–1	Galway United	Inchicore, Dublin 8
19:45 GMT	Melia 36'; Nolan 88'	Report	Lomboto 70'	Stadium: Richmond Park; Attendance: 4,077; Referee: Gavin Colfer

7 June 2024 19	Derry City	2–0	Galway United	Derry, Northern Ireland
19:45 GMT	Patching 65'; Hoban 86'	Report		Stadium: Ryan McBride Brandywell Stadium; Attendance: 2,429; Referee: Eoghan O'Shea

13 June 2024 20	Galway United	3–0	Drogheda United	Terryland, County Galway
19:45 GMT	Walsh 7', 61'; O'Keeffe 90+2'	Report		Stadium: Eamonn Deacy Park; Attendance: 1,668; Referee: Neil Doyle

28 June 2024 21	Shelbourne	2–0	Galway United	Drumcondra, Dublin 3
19:45 GMT	Martin 12'; Caffrey 12'	Report	Lomboto (penalty missed) 75'; Dervin (yellow card) 90' (yellow-red card) 90+1'	Stadium: Tolka Park; Attendance: 3,643; Referee: Rob Hennessy

4 July 2024 22	Galway United	1–1	Bohemians	Terryland, County Galway
19:45 GMT	Slevin 50'	Report	Rooney 4' (pen.)	Stadium: Eamonn Deacy Park; Attendance: 2,319; Referee: Eoghan O'Shea

12 July 2024 23	Galway United	1–0	Waterford	Terryland, County Galway
19:45 GMT	Hickey 24'	Report		Stadium: Eamonn Deacy Park; Attendance: 2,024; Referee: Damien Macgraith

27 July 2024 24	Sligo Rovers	2–0	Galway United	Sligo, County Sligo
19:45 GMT	Waweru 32'; Pearce 90+5'	Report		Stadium: The Showgrounds; Attendance: 2,976; Referee: Gavin Colfer

2 August 2024 25	Dundalk	0–2	Galway United	Dundalk, County Louth
19:45 GMT		Report	Walsh 54', 87'	Stadium: Oriel Park; Attendance: 2,114; Referee: Paul Norton

11 August 2024 26	Galway United	1–1	St Patrick's Athletic	Terryland, County Galway
19:45 GMT	McCarthy 54'	Report	McClelland 37'	Stadium: Eamonn Deacy Park; Attendance: 2,813; Referee: Daniel Murphy

25 August 2024 27	Shamrock Rovers	1–1	Galway United	Tallaght, Dublin 24
19:45 GMT	Mandroiu 88'	Report	Hickey 74'	Stadium: Tallaght Stadium; Attendance: 3,017; Referee: Gavin Colfer

30 August 2024 28	Galway United	1–0	Derry City	Terryland, County Galway
19:45 GMT	Hickey 76'	Report		Stadium: Eamonn Deacy Park; Attendance: 2,574; Referee: Kevin O'Sullivan

16 September 2024 29	Galway United	1–2	Shamrock Rovers	Terryland, County Galway
19:45 GMT	McCormack 32' (pen.); Buckley 84' (o.g.)	Report	McNulty 20'	Stadium: Eamonn Deacy Park; Attendance: 3,335; Referee: Neil Doyle

20 September 2024 30	Galway United	1–0	Shelbourne	Terryland, County Galway
19:45 GMT	Keohane 2'	Report		Stadium: Eamonn Deacy Park; Attendance: 3,072; Referee: Kevin O'Sullivan

23 September 2024 31	Drogheda United	0–0	Galway United	Drogheda, County Louth
19:45 GMT		Report		Stadium: Sullivan and Lambe Park; Attendance: 1,618; Referee: Gavin Colfer

27 September 2024 32	Waterford	1–2	Galway United	Waterford, County Waterford
19:45 GMT	McMenamy 7'; Amond (penalty missed) 11'	Report	Walsh 62'; Brouder 69'	Stadium: RSC; Attendance: 2,357; Referee: Paul Norton

4 October 2024 33	Galway United	1–1	Dundalk	Terryland, County Galway
19:45 GMT	Hickey 41'	Report	Kenny 90+6'	Stadium: Eamonn Deacy Park; Attendance: 4,128; Referee: Eoghan O'Shea

18 October 2024 34	St Patrick's Athletic	2–1	Galway United	Inchicore, Dublin 8
19:45 GMT	Keena 32', 69'	Report	McCarthy 51'	Stadium: Richmond Park; Attendance: 4,851; Referee: Neil Doyle

25 October 2024 35	Galway United	2–2	Sligo Rovers	Terryland, County Galway
19:45 GMT	Keohane 2'; Walsh 83'	Report	Pearce 34'; Power 60'	Stadium: Eamonn Deacy Park; Attendance: 4,323; Referee: Kevin O'Sullivan

1 November 2024 36	Bohemians	1–1	Galway United	Phibsborough, Dublin 7
19:45 GMT	Rooney 21'	Report	Hurley 40'	Stadium: Dalymount Park; Attendance: 4,196; Referee: Rob Hennessy

=== FAI Cup ===
Win Draw Loss

==== Second Round ====
19 July 2024 Second Round	Galway United	6–0	Longford Town	Terryland, County Galway
19:45 GMT	Lomboto 11'; Nugent 23'; Hickey 25'; Hurley 60' (pen.); Keohane 68'; Ogedi-Uzokwe 87'	Report		Stadium: Eamonn Deacy Park; Attendance: 1,204; Referee: David Dunne

==== Third Round ====
16 August 2024 Third Round	Shelbourne	1–1 (a.e.t.) (5–3 p)	Galway United	Drumcondra, Dublin 3
19:45 GMT	O'Brien 94'	Report	Keohane 115'	Stadium: Tolka Park; Attendance: 1,682; Referee: Rob Harvey
	Penalties
	O'Brien (penalty scored); Lunney (penalty scored); Coyle (penalty scored); Coote (penalty scored); Burt (penalty scored)		Hurley (penalty scored); Keohane (penalty scored); Clarke (penalty scored); Buckley (penalty missed)

=== Friendlies ===
Win Draw Loss

==== Pre-season Friendlies ====
13 January 2024	Treaty United	0–2	Galway United	Garryowen, Limerick
15:00 GMT			Walsh 43'	Stadium: Markets Field; Referee: Eoghan O'Shea

16 January 2024	Cork City	0–4	Galway United	Turners Cross, Cork
15:00 GMT			McCarthy 20'	Stadium: Turners Cross; Referee: Kevin O'Sullivan

18 January 2024	Kerry	0–3	Galway United	Killarney, County Kerry
14:00 GMT			Walsh 31'; McCarthy 64'	Stadium: Celtic Park; Referee: Adrian Quirke

27 January 2024	Sligo Rovers	1–0	Galway United	Westport, County Mayo
14:00 GMT	Waweru 63'			Stadium: United Park; Referee: Damien Macgraith

3 February 2024	Longford Town	0–3	Galway United	Longford, County Longford
19:45 GMT				Stadium: Bishopsgate; Referee: Declan Toland

6 February 2024	Sligo Rovers	1–1	Galway United	Castlebar, County Mayo
14:00 GMT	Morahan 2'			Stadium: Milebush Park; Referee: Damien Macgraith

9 February 2024	Galway United	0–1	Wexford	Terryland, County Galway
19:45 GMT			Rowe 66'	Stadium: Eamon Deacy Park; Referee: Marc Lynch

== Statistics ==
=== Appearances and goals ===
This table shows all of the players who have featured in a first team squad for Galway United this season
Brackets denotes appearances made as a substitute

No.	Pos.	Player	League		FAI Cup		Total	
No.	Pos.	Player	Apps	Goals	Apps	Goals	Apps	Goals
1	GK	(Republic of Ireland) Brendan Clarke	36	0	2	0	38	0
2	DF	(Republic of Ireland) Conor O'Keeffe	16(11)	1	1(1)	0	17	1
3	DF	(Republic of Ireland) Regan Donelon	13(5)	0	0	0	13	0
4	DF	(Republic of Ireland) Rob Slevin	28(6)	2	1(1)	0	29	2
5	DF	(Republic of Ireland) Killian Brouder	35	1	2	0	37	1
6	MF	(Republic of Ireland) Maurice Nugent	17(8)	3	2(1)	1	19	4
7	FW	(Republic of Ireland) Stephen Walsh	33(6)	9	1	0	34	9
8	MF	(Republic of Ireland) Aodh Dervin	16(6)	1	0	0	16	1
8	DF	(Republic of Ireland) Greg Cunningham	10(2)	0	1	0	11	0
9	FW	(Algeria) Wassim Aouachria	9(8)	0	0	0	9	0
9	FW	(England) Junior Ogedi-Uzokwe	4(4)	0	1	1	5	1
10	MF	(Republic of Ireland) David Hurley	36(12)	2	2(2)	1	38	3
11	MF	(Republic of Ireland) Karl O'Sullivan	29(8)	0	1(1)	0	30	0
12	FW	(Albania) Leo Gaxha	8(8)	0	0	0	8	0
14	DF	(Republic of Ireland) Billy Regan	0	0	0	0	0	0
15	MF	(United States) Patrick Hickey	31(13)	4	2	1	33	5
16	GK	(England) Joe Wright	0	0	0	0	0	0
16	GK	(Republic of Ireland) Jack Brady	0	0	0	0	0	0
17	MF	(United States) Vincent Borden	27(4)	1	2(1)	0	29	1
18	DF	(Northern Ireland) Bobby Burns	14(7)	0	2(1)	0	16	0
19	FW	(Republic of Ireland) Francely Lomboto	20(18)	1	2(1)	1	22	2
20	FW	(England) Tom Costello	3(3)	0	0	0	3	0
20	MF	(Republic of Ireland) Jimmy Keohane	15	2	2	2	17	4
21	DF	(Republic of Ireland) Colm Horgan	14(5)	0	1	0	15	0
22	MF	(Republic of Ireland) Conor McCormack	33(2)	1	2	0	35	1
24	MF	(Republic of Ireland) Ed McCarthy	36(3)	4	1	0	37	4
26	DF	(Republic of Ireland) Garry Buckley	21(3)	0	2	0	23	0
27	FW	(Republic of Ireland) Kyle Fitzgerald	1(1)	0	1(1)	0	2	0
28	FW	(Republic of Ireland) Brian Cunningham	0	0	0	0	0	0
29	FW	(Republic of Ireland) Cillian Tollett	1(1)	0	0	0	1	0
30	DF	(England) Al-Amin Kazeem	20(6)	0	0	0	20	0
33	DF	(Cameroon) Jeannot Esua	27(4)	0	1	0	28	0
40	GK	(Republic of Ireland) Kieran McDonagh	0	0	0	0	0	0

=== Clean sheets ===
No.	Player	League	FAI Cup	Total		
No.	Player	1	(Republic of Ireland) Brendan Clarke	16	1	17

=== Disciplinary record ===
No.	Player	League			FAI Cup			Total		
No.	Player	Yellow card	(yellow card) (yellow-red card)	Red card	Yellow card	(yellow card) (yellow-red card)	Red card	Yellow card	(yellow card) (yellow-red card)	Red card
22	Conor McCormack	14	0	0	1	0	0	15	0	0
7	Stephen Walsh	8	0	1	0	0	0	8	0	1
4	Rob Slevin	5	0	0	0	0	0	5	0	0
8	Greg Cunningham	5	0	0	0	0	0	5	0	0
10	David Hurley	5	0	0	0	0	0	5	0	0
5	Killian Brouder	3	0	0	1	0	0	4	0	0
15	Patrick Hickey	4	0	0	0	0	0	4	0	0
6	Maurice Nugent	2	0	0	1	0	0	3	0	0
8	Aodh Dervin	2	1	0	0	0	0	2	1	0
11	Karl O'Sullivan	2	1	0	0	0	0	2	1	0
18	Bobby Burns	2	0	0	1	0	0	3	0	0
21	Colm Horgan	3	0	0	0	0	0	3	0	0
26	Garry Buckley	3	0	0	0	0	0	3	0	0
30	Al-Amin Kazeem	3	0	0	0	0	0	3	0	0
1	Brendan Clarke	2	0	0	0	0	0	2	0	0
33	Jeannot Esua	2	0	0	0	0	0	2	0	0
2	Conor O'Keeffe	1	0	0	0	0	0	1	0	0
17	Vincent Borden	1	0	0	0	0	0	1	0	0
19	Francely Lomboto	1	0	0	0	0	0	1	0	0
Totals		68	2	1	4	0	0	72	2	1

== International call-ups ==
=== Republic of Ireland Under 17 National Team ===
Player	Fixture	Date	Location	Event
Cillian Tollett	vs. Northern Ireland	1 November 2024	Belfast, Northern Ireland	2025 UEFA European Under-17 Championship qualification
