= 2019 FAI Cup =

Extra.ie FAI Cup

Tournament details
- Country: Republic of Ireland; Northern Ireland
- Venue(s): Aviva Stadium, Dublin
- Dates: 19 April – 3 November 2019
- Teams: 40

Final positions
- Champions: Shamrock Rovers (25th title)
- Runners-up: Dundalk
- Europa League: Derry City (Note: Since the winners of the FAI Cup, Shamrock Rovers, qualified for the Europa League based on their league position, the Europa League qualifying spot awarded to the FAI Cup winner was passed to the fourth-placed team in the Premier Division, Derry City.)

Tournament statistics
- Matches played: 35
- Goals scored: 117 (3.34 per match)
- Top goal scorer(s): Kris Twardek, David Cawley, Liam Kerrigan (4 goals)
- Goals scored in penalty shoot-outs not included.

The 2019 FAI Cup (known as the Extra.ie FAI Cup for sponsorship purposes) was the 99th edition of the annual Republic of Ireland's cup competition. Forty teams participated in the competition, including all teams from the Premier Division and First Division. The competition began on 19 April 2019 with the first of five rounds and ended on 3 November 2019 with the final at the Aviva Stadium in Dublin, a nominally neutral venue, which has hosted the final since 2010.

The defending champions were Premier Division side Dundalk, after they defeated Cork City 2–1 in the previous final.

Shamrock Rovers won the final 4–2 against Dundalk for their 25th title. Because Rovers qualified for the Europa League through the Premier Division, the fourth-place team in the Premier Division, Derry City, earned qualification for 2020–21 edition of the UEFA Europa League.

== Qualifying round ==
The draw for the qualifying round was made on 20 March 2019 at the National Sports Campus in Abbotstown. Former Republic of Ireland international Keith Fahey and FAI Vice President Noel Fitzroy performed the draw, with representatives from the clubs in attendance.

A total of 20 teams were in the qualifying round draw: 16 intermediate teams and four junior teams. Four teams received byes into the first round of the competition: Cobh Wanderers, Crumlin United, Letterkenny Rovers and Killester Donnycarney.

All ties were set to be played the week ending Sunday 21 April.

19 April 2019	Maynooth University Town	5–1	Rockmount	Maynooth
19:00	Darragh Reynor; Eoin McDermott	Report	Danny Whelan-Aherne 7'	Stadium: Rathcoffey Road

19 April 2019	St. Mochta's	0–1	Collinstown	Clonsilla
19:45	Dean Kelly (yellow card) 89' (yellow-red card)	Report	Ian McNeill 26'	Stadium: Porterstown Road

20 April 2019	Newtown Rangers	3–4 (a.e.t.)	Avondale United	Tallaght
14:00	Lee Murtagh 44' David Costigan 76' Carl Wynne 82'	Report	David Shovlin 23'; Danny O'Connell 61'; Jamie Murphy 66'; David Shovlin 113'	Stadium: Farrell Park

20 April 2019	UCC	0–2	Malahide United	Cork
15:00		Report	Mark Brennan 1'; Calvin Dooney 90'	Stadium: The Farm

20 April 2019	Glebe North	2–1	Midleton	Balbriggan
14:00	Sean O'Connor 30'; Sean O'Connor 72'	Report	Jake Hegarty 82'	Stadium: Market Green

21 April 2019	Glengad United	1–1 (a.e.t.) (5–4 p)	Home Farm	Glengad
15:00	Stephen Fildara 80'	Report	Padraic Gilsenan 85'	Stadium: The Crua
	Penalties
	James McKinney (penalty scored); Adam Byrne (penalty scored); Michael Byrne (penalty missed); John McLaughlin (penalty scored); Matty Byrne (penalty scored); Dillon Ruddy (penalty scored)		(penalty scored) Eoin Murray; (penalty scored) Darragh Deegan; (penalty missed) Aaron O'Dwyer; (penalty scored) Bradlee Hand; (penalty scored) David McGrath; (penalty missed) David Pepper

25 May 2019	St. Michael's	1–0	Sheriff YC	Tipperary
19:00	Oliver O'Driscoll 50'	Report	Stephen Maher (red card) 30'	Stadium: Cooke Park

26 May 2019	Lucan United	3–1 (a.e.t.)	Aisling Annacotty	Celbridge
13:00	Marco Chindea; Harmony Mercer; Andrew Bracken	Report	Ben Banaghan	Stadium: Celbridge Football Park

== First round ==
The draw for the first round took place on 8 July 2019 at the Aviva Stadium in Dublin, and was hosted by Con Murphy. National under-21 team manager Stephen Kenny and former Derry City manager Gavin Dykes performed the draw.

A total of 32 teams were in the first round draw: 20 teams from the Premier Division and First Division, four teams who received byes from the qualifying round and eight winners of the qualifying round.

All ties were set to be played the week ending Sunday 11 August, except the tie between Athlone Town and Longford Town, which was postponed to 13 August due to an unplayable pitch.

Teams in bold advanced to the second round.

Premier Division	First Division	Leinster Senior League	Munster Senior League	Ulster Senior League	Teams from other leagues
**Bohemians**; **Cork City**; **Derry City**; **Dundalk**; Finn Harps; **Shamrock Rovers**; **Sligo Rovers**; **St Patrick's Athletic**; **UCD**; **Waterford**	Athlone Town; Bray Wanderers; Cabinteely; Cobh Ramblers; **Drogheda United**; **Galway United**; **Limerick**; **Longford Town**; Shelbourne; Wexford	Collinstown; **Crumlin United**; Glebe North; Killester Donnycarney; **Lucan United**; Malahide United; Maynooth University Town	Avondale United; Cobh Wanderers	Letterkenny Rovers	Inishowen League: **Glengad United**; Tipperary South District League: St. Michael's

9 August 2019	Cobh Wanderers	**0–1**	**Limerick**	Cobh
19:00		Report	Edmond O’Dwyer 79'	Stadium: St Colman's Park; Referee: Andrew Mullally

9 August 2019	**Bohemians**	**3–2**	Shelbourne	Phibsborough
19:45	Buckley 85'; Mandroiu 88' 90+1'	Report	Kilduff 62'; Farrell 81'; Kabia (yellow card) 74' (yellow-red card) 82'	Stadium: Dalymount Park; Attendance: 2,987; Referee: Robert Harvey

9 August 2019	Cabinteely	**2–2** (a.e.t.) (**4–5** p)	**Cork City**	Blackrock
19:45	Kevin Knight 76'; Rob Manley 94'	Report	Conor McCarthy 20'; Ronan Hurley 119'	Stadium: Stradbrook; Attendance: 550 (estimated); Referee: Paul McLaughlin
	**Penalties**
	Rob Manley (penalty missed); Jack Tuite (penalty scored); Conor Keeley (penalty scored); Paul Fox (penalty scored); Kevin Knight (penalty scored)		(penalty scored) Dan Casey; (penalty scored) Karl Sheppard; (penalty scored) Conor McCormack; (penalty scored) Joel Coustrain; (penalty scored) Gearóid Morrissey

9 August 2019	**Derry City**	**1–0**	Wexford	Derry
19:45	Parkhouse 84'	Report		Stadium: Ryan McBride Brandywell Stadium; Referee: Damien McGrath

9 August 2019	**Drogheda United**	**2–1**	Avondale United	Drogheda
19:45	Mark Doyle 13'; Ryan O'Shea 74'	Report	Luke McNally 61' (o.g.)	Stadium: United Park; Attendance: 400 (estimated); Referee: Alan Patchell

9 August 2019	**St Patrick's Athletic**	**2–1**	Bray Wanderers	Inchicore
19:45	David Webster 55'; Glen McAuley 74'	Report	Dean Williams 40'	Stadium: Richmond Park; Attendance: 700 (estimated); Referee: Derek Tomney

9 August 2019	Glebe North	**0–8**	**Sligo Rovers**	Balbriggan
19:45		Report	David Cawley 12', 49', 76'; Regan Donelon 37'; Dante Leverock 53'; Kris Twardek 65', 80', 90+2' (pen.)	Stadium: Market Green; Attendance: 400 (estimated); Referee: David Dunne

9 August 2019	**Shamrock Rovers**	**1–0**	Finn Harps	Tallaght
20:00	Daniel Carr 22'	Report		Stadium: Tallaght Stadium; Attendance: 1,372; Referee: Paul Tuite

10 August 2019	St. Michael's	**0–0** (a.e.t.) (**7–8** p)	**Glengad United**	Tipperary
15:00	Colin Bargary (red card) 81'	Report		Stadium: Cooke Park
	**Penalties**
	Higgins (penalty scored); Carr (penalty missed); O'Brien (penalty scored); O'Driscoll (penalty scored); Slattery (penalty scored); Ryan (penalty scored); Kennedy (penalty scored); Armshaw (penalty scored); Breen (penalty missed)		James McKinney (penalty missed); Matthew Byrne (penalty scored); Michael Byrne (penalty scored); John McLaughlin (penalty scored); Dillon Ruddy (penalty scored); Cathal McDaid (penalty scored); Connor Barrow (penalty scored); Fionn McClure (penalty scored); Terence Doherty (penalty scored)

10 August 2019	**Crumlin United**	**3–1**	Malahide United	Crumlin
18:00	Craig Walsh 10'; Gar Brady 18'; Alan McGreal 45' (pen.)	Report	8'	Stadium: Pearse Park; Referee: Eddie Reilly

10 August 2019	Cobh Ramblers	**0–1**	**Dundalk**	Cobh
19:00		Report	Georgie Kelly 67'	Stadium: St Colman's Park; Referee: Raymond Matthews

11 August 2019	**Lucan United**	**2–1**	Killester Donnycarney	Celbridge
11:00	Marco Chindea 30'; Aji Sule 63'	Report	John Brophy 90+3'	Stadium: Celbridge Football Park; Attendance: 150 (estimated)

11 August 2019	Collinstown	**1–2**	**Galway United**	Whitehall
14:00	Jamie Aherne 11'	Report	Conor Barry 12'; Conor Barry 15'	Stadium: Whitehall Stadium; Referee: Paul Tuite

11 August 2019	**UCD**	**5–2**	Letterkenny Rovers	Belfield
14:00	Yousef Mahdy 50'; Jason McClelland 60'; Richie O'Farrell 73'; Liam Kerrigan 83', 90+3'	Report	BJ Banda 22', 77'	Stadium: UCD Bowl; Referee: Paula Brady

11 August 2019	Maynooth University Town	**0–2**	**Waterford**	Maynooth
15:00		Report	Shane Duggan 42'; Kenny Browne 57'	Stadium: Rathcoffey Road

13 August 2019	**Longford Town**	**3–1**	Athlone Town	Longford
19:45	Aaron Dobbs 46' 90'; Joseph Manley 71'		Kealon Dillon 40'	Stadium: City Calling Stadium
Note: Originally due to be played on 10 August but was postponed until 13 August due to a waterlogged pitch.

== Second round ==
Teams in bold advanced to the Quarterfinals.

Premier Division	First Division	Leinster Senior League	Inishowen League
**Bohemians**; Cork City; Derry City; **Dundalk**; **Shamrock Rovers**; **Sligo Rovers**; St Patrick's Athletic; **UCD**; **Waterford**	Drogheda United; **Galway United**; Longford Town; Limerick	**Crumlin United**; Lucan United	Glengad United

The draw for the second round took place on 12 August 2019 and was broadcast live on the Extra.ie Facebook page.

All ties were played on the week ending Sunday 25 August.

23 August 2019	**Bohemians**	**1–1** (a.e.t.) (**5–4** p)	Longford Town	Phibsborough
19:45	Andre Wright 91'	Report	Jack Doherty 94'	Stadium: Dalymount Park; Attendance: 1869; Referee: Paul Tuite
	**Penalties**
	Danny Mandroiu (penalty missed); Conor Levingston (penalty scored); Keith Ward (penalty scored); Ross Tierney (penalty scored); Darragh Leahy (penalty scored); Andre Wright (penalty scored)		(penalty missed) Dean Byrne; (penalty scored) Anto Breslin; (penalty scored) Jack Doherty; (penalty scored) Karl Chambers; (penalty scored) Sam Verdon; (penalty missed) Lee Stacey

23 August 2019	Derry City	**2–3** (a.e.t.)	**Dundalk**	Derry
19:45	Gregory Sloggett 51'; Darren McCauley 84'	Report	Daniel Kelly 33'; Daniel Cleary 53'; Georgie Kelly 117'	Stadium: Ryan McBride Brandywell Stadium; Referee: Robert Harvey

23 August 2019	**Galway United**	**1–0**	Cork City	Galway
19:45	Conor Melody 45'	Report		Stadium: Eamonn Deacy Park; Attendance: 717; Referee: Robert Rogers

23 August 2019	**UCD**	**3–1**	St Patrick's Athletic	Belfield
19:45	Yousef Mahdy 21'; Liam Kerrigan 27', 46'; Jack Keaney (red card) 90'	Report	Conor Clifford 80'	Stadium: UCD Bowl; Attendance: 585; Referee: Graham Kelly

23 August 2019	**Shamrock Rovers**	**4–0**	Drogheda United	Tallaght
20:00	Gary O'Neill 56'; Aaron Greene 60'; Aaron McEneff 73'; Sean Kavanagh 87'	Report		Stadium: Tallaght Stadium; Attendance: 1805; Referee: Paul McLaughlin

24 August 2019	Glengad United	**0–2**	**Waterford**	Buncrana
17:00		Report	Michael O'Connor 70'; Cory Galvin 85'	Stadium: Maginn Park (Note: Glengad United played their second round match at Maginn Park, Buncrana, instead of their regular stadium, The Crua, Glengad.); Referee: Damien MacGraith

24 August 2019	**Sligo Rovers**	**6–2**	Limerick	Sligo
20:00	Romeo Parkes 24', 46'; Ronan Coughlan 30'; Dante Leverock (red card) 38'; Regan Donelon 45'; David Cawley 60'; Kristopher Twardek 76'	Report	Karl O'Sullivan 7', 9'; Shaun Kelly (yellow card) 35' (yellow-red card) 44'; Clyde O' Connell (red card) 62'; Jason Hughes (red card) 64'	Stadium: The Showgrounds; Attendance: 1428; Referee: Robert Hennessy

25 August 2019	**Crumlin United**	**3–1**	Lucan United	Crumlin
14:00	Shane Maloney 9' (o.g.); Jake Donnelley 18' (pen.); Alan McGreal 41'	Report	Patrick Seerey 69'	Stadium: CBS Captain's Road; Attendance: 200 (estimate); Referee: Barry Fitzpatrick

== Quarter-finals ==
Teams in bold advanced to the semi-finals.

Premier Division	First Division	Leinster Senior League
**Bohemians**; **Dundalk**; **Shamrock Rovers**; **Sligo Rovers**; UCD; Waterford	Galway United	Crumlin United

6 September 2019	Galway United	**1–2**	**Shamrock Rovers**	Galway
19:45	Maurice Nugent 34'	Report	Aaron Greene 56'; Lee Grace 90+3'	Stadium: Eamonn Deacy Park; Attendance: 1,525; Referee: Derek tomney

7 September 2019	**Sligo Rovers**	**4–0**	UCD	Sligo
19:45	Ronan Coughlan 8'; Conor Kearns 56' (o.g.); Regan Donelon 54' (pen.); Niall Watson 89'	Report		Stadium: The Showgrounds; Attendance: 1,927; Referee: Paul McLoughlin

9 September 2019	Waterford	**1–3**	**Dundalk**	Waterford
19:45	Maxim Kouogum 56'	Report	Daniel Kelly 9', 23', 33'	Stadium: Regional Sports Centre; Attendance: 954; Referee: Paul Tuite

16 September 2019	Crumlin United	**0–2**	**Bohemians**	Inchicore
20:00		Report	Andre Wright 15'; Andy Lyons 55'	Stadium: Richmond Park (Note: Crumlin United played their quarter-final match at Richmond Park, Inchicore, instead of their regular stadium, Pearse Park, Crumlin.); Referee: Rob Rogers

== Semi-finals ==
Premier Division
- Bohemians
- Dundalk
- Shamrock Rovers
- Sligo Rovers

The draw for the semi-finals took place on 12 September 2019 and was broadcast live on Morning Ireland on RTÉ Radio 1. Both ties were played on the weekend ending 29 September and were shown live on RTÉ2.

27 September 2019	Bohemians	0–2	Shamrock Rovers	Phibsborough, Dublin
19:45	Danny Mandroiu (red card) 77'	Report	Graham Burke 15'; Aaron Greene 80'	Stadium: Dalymount Park; Attendance: 3,600; Referee: Rob Hennessy

29 September 2019	Sligo Rovers	0–1	Dundalk	Sligo
17:00		Report	Michael Duffy 89'	Stadium: The Showgrounds; Attendance: 4,079; Referee: Rob Harvey

== Final ==
3 November 2019
15:30

Dundalk	1–1 (a.e.t.)	Shamrock Rovers
Michael Duffy 90+3'	Report	Aaron McEneff 89' (pen.)
Penalties
Jamie McGrath (penalty scored); Michael Duffy (penalty missed); Daniel Cleary (penalty missed); Jordan Flores (penalty scored)	2–4	Jack Byrne (penalty scored); Joey O'Brien (penalty scored); Greg Bolger (penalty scored); Gary O'Neill (penalty scored)

Aviva Stadium, Dublin
Attendance: 33,111
Referee: Derek Tomney

== Top scorers ==
Rank	Player	Club	Goals
1	(Canada) Kristopher Twardek	Sligo Rovers	4
1	(Republic of Ireland) David Cawley	Sligo Rovers	4
1	(Republic of Ireland) Liam Kerrigan	UCD	4
4	(Republic of Ireland) Eoin McDermott	Maynooth University Town	3
4	(Republic of Ireland) Daniel Kelly	Dundalk	3
4	(Republic of Ireland) Regan Donelon	Sligo Rovers	3
4	(Republic of Ireland) Aaron Greene	Shamrock Rovers	3
8	(Northern Ireland) Aaron McEneff	Shamrock Rovers	2
8	(Northern Ireland) Michael Duffy	Dundalk	2
8	(England) Andre Wright	Bohemians	2
8	(Republic of Ireland) Ronan Coughlan	Sligo Rovers	2
8	(Republic of Ireland) Alan McGreal	Crumlin United	2
8	(Republic of Ireland) Yousef Mahdy	UCD	2
8	(Republic of Ireland) Georgie Kelly	Dundalk	2
8	(Republic of Ireland) Aaron Dobbs	Longford Town	2
8	(South Africa) BJ Banda	Letterkenny Rovers	2
8	(Republic of Ireland) Conor Barry	Galway United	2
8	(Romania) Marco Chindea	Lucan United	2
8	(Republic of Ireland) Danny Mandroiu	Bohemians	2
8	(Republic of Ireland) Darragh Reynor	Maynooth University Town	2

== See also ==
- 2019 League of Ireland Premier Division
- 2019 League of Ireland First Division
- 2019 League of Ireland Cup
