= Dara McGuinness =

Irish footballer (born 2004)

Personal information
- Full name: Dara McGuinness
- Date of birth: 12 February 2004 (age 22)
- Place of birth: Monksland, County Roscommon, Ireland
- Position: Striker

Team information
- Current team: Galway United
- Number: 27

Youth career
- St Joseph's (Athlone)
- –2019: Belvedere
- 2019–2020: St Patrick's Athletic
- 2020–2022: Shamrock Rovers
- 2022–2025: Stoke City

Senior career*
Years	Team	Apps	(Gls)
2019	St Patrick's Athletic	0	(0)
2020	Shamrock Rovers II	2	(0)
2024–2025	Stoke City	0	(0)
2024–2025	→ Leek Town (loan)	3	(0)
2025	Finn Harps	14	(6)
2025–	Galway United	10	(1)

International career^{‡}
2020	Republic of Ireland U16	4	(2)
2021	Republic of Ireland U18	4	(1)
- * Club domestic league appearances and goals as of 22:34, 21 November 2025 (UTC) ‡ National team caps and goals as of 18:39, 15 September 2025 (UTC)

Dara McGuinness (born 12 February 2004) is an Irish professional footballer who plays as a striker for League of Ireland Premier Division club Galway United. He previously played for St Patrick's Athletic, Shamrock Rovers II, Stoke City, Leek Town and Finn Harps.

== Career ==
=== Youth career ===
A native of Monksland, on the County Roscommon side of the outskirts of Athlone, McGuinness began playing with local club St Joseph's, where he impressed to the point of representing the Athlone District Schoolboys League at the prestigious Kennedy Cup, where he earned a move to Dublin club Belvedere and then later a move to the academy of League of Ireland club St Patrick's Athletic.

=== St Patrick's Athletic ===
On 16 November 2019, McGuinness made his senior debut for St Patrick's Athletic, coming off the bench in a 4–0 win over Athlone Town at Richmond Park in the final of the 2018–19 Leinster Senior Cup in a side made up entirely of academy players.

=== Shamrock Rovers II ===
In 2020, McGuinness moved to the academy of Shamrock Rovers. On 6 March 2020, he made his League of Ireland First Division debut for the club's reserve side Shamrock Rovers II in a 1–0 defeat away to Cabinteely, before making a second appearance for the side by the end of the season.

=== Stoke City ===
On 7 July 2022, McGuinness signed for the academy of EFL Championship club Stoke City. On 10 September 2024, he signed for Northern Premier League Premier Division club Leek Town on loan until 4 January 2025.

=== Finn Harps ===
On 27 January 2025, McGuinness signed for League of Ireland First Division club Finn Harps. He made his debut for the club on 14 February 2025, in a 2–0 defeat away to Kerry. On 21 February 2025, he scored his first goal in senior football, in a 3–1 loss to Treaty United at the Markets Field. On 18 April 2025, he scored a brace in a 4–2 win over Kerry at Finn Park. On 5 July 2025, Harps manager Kevin McHugh confirmed that McGuinness had left the club, after scoring 6 goals in 14 appearances during his time there, stating "His contract was up in June, Dara and his agent have sat down and he wants to play in the Premier Division. There are two or three clubs interested in him."

=== Galway United ===
On 23 July 2025, McGuinness made signed for League of Ireland Premier Division club Galway United. He made his debut 2 days later, coming on as a half time substitute for Jeannot Esua, before scoring in the 74th minute of an eventual 4–2 loss to Waterford at Eamonn Deacy Park.

== International career ==
McGuinness made his international debut in January 2020, featuring 4 times for the Republic of Ireland U16 side in the Aegean Cup in Turkey, scoring 2 goals in a 4–0 win over Kosovo U16 during the tournament. In 2021, he featured 4 times for the Republic of Ireland U18 side, scoring once.

== Career statistics ==
As of match played on 24 October 2025

Appearances and goals by club, season and competition
Club	Season	League			National Cup (Note: Includes FAI Cup & FA Cup)		League Cup (Note: Includes League of Ireland Cup & EFL Cup)		Other		Total	
Club	Season	Division	Apps	Goals	Apps	Goals	Apps	Goals	Apps	Goals	Apps	Goals
St Patrick's Athletic	2019	LOI Premier Division	0	0	0	0	0	0	1 (Note: Appearance(s) in the Leinster Senior Cup)	0	1	0
Shamrock Rovers II	2020	LOI First Division	2	0	—		—		—		2	0
Stoke City	2024–25	EFL Championship	0	0	—		0	0	—		0	0
Leek Town (loan)	2024–25	NPL Premier Division	3	0	1	0	—		—		4	0
Finn Harps	2025	LOI First Division	14	6	—		—		—		14	6
Galway United	2025	LOI Premier Division	10	1	2	1	—		—		12	2
Galway United	2026	LOI Premier Division	0	0	0	0	—		—		0	0
Galway United	Total		10	1	2	1	–		–		12	2
Career Total			29	7	3	1	0	0	1	0	33	8

== Honours ==
St Patrick's Athletic

- Leinster Senior Cup (1): 2018–19
