= Sean Kerrigan =

Irish footballer (born 2002)

Personal information
- Date of birth: 5 July 2002 (age 24)
- Place of birth: Tubbercurry, County Sligo, Ireland
- Position: Midfielder

Youth career
- –2019: Real Tubber
- 2019–2021: Sligo Rovers
- 2021: Finn Harps

College career
Years	Team	Apps	(Gls)
2021–2023	Mercyhurst Lakers	37	(25)
2023–2024	Michigan State	31	(10)

Senior career*
Years	Team	Apps	(Gls)
2021	Finn Harps	0	(0)
2022	AFC Ann Arbor	12	(2)
2024	Salem City	13	(1)
2025	Galway United	9	(0)
- * Club domestic league appearances and goals as of 14:46, 20 July 2025 (UTC)

Sean Kerrigan (born 5 July 2002) is an Irish professional footballer who plays as a midfielder most recently for League of Ireland Premier Division club Galway United. He previously played for AFC Ann Arbor and Salem City in America's USL League Two.

== Career ==
=== Youth career ===
A native of Tubbercurry, County Sligo, Kerrigan began playing his schoolboy football with local club Real Tubber before joining the academy of League of Ireland club Sligo Rovers in 2019, playing for the under-17 side initially, before moving up to the under-19 team in 2020. In July 2021, he joined Finn Harps' under-19 team and was called up to the first team soon after, remaining an unused substitute once in the league and once in the FAI Cup.

=== College career ===
Kerrigan moved to America to go to college in 2021, playing for the Mercyhurst Lakers, scoring 5 goals in 17 games in 2021, before scoring an impressive total of 20 goals in 20 games in 2022. His goals helped the team to win the Pennsylvania State Athletic Conference title. Kerrigan's performances in 2022 saw him named in The United Soccer Coaches Association All-Region team. He moved to Michigan State in 2023, scoring 10 goals in 31 appearances over his 2 seasons with the team.

=== AFC Ann Arbor ===
In 2022, Kerrigan played for USL League Two club AFC Ann Arbor, scoring 2 goals in 13 appearances as they came third in the Great Lakes Division, missing out on the playoffs.

=== Salem City ===
In 2024, he played with USL League Two club Salem City, scoring 1 goal in 13 appearances as they finished in first place in 2024 USL League Two South Atlantic Division, qualifying for the playoffs, in which they were defeated 2–0 by Lionsbridge in the Eastern Conference semi-final.

=== Galway United ===
On 24 January 2025, he returned home, signing for League of Ireland Premier Division club Galway United. The following day he scored in a pre-season friendly against Sligo Rovers. He made his competitive debut for the club on 7 March 2025, replacing Bobby Burns from the bench as a late substitute in a 1–1 draw with Derry City at the Ryan McBride Brandywell Stadium. On 20 July 2025, it was announced that Kerrigan had left the club after making just 9 appearances.

== Personal life ==
His brother Liam Kerrigan is a professional footballer and has played in Ireland, Italy and Belgium, while the pair's cousin, Johnny Kenny is an Irish international, having played club football in Ireland and Scotland.

== Career statistics ==
As of match played on 16 May 2025

Appearances and goals by club, season and competition
Club	Season	League			National Cup (Note: Includes FAI Cup)		Other		Total	
Club	Season	Division	Apps	Goals	Apps	Goals	Apps	Goals	Apps	Goals
Finn Harps	2021	LOI Premier Division	0	0	0	0	—		0	0
AFC Ann Arbor	2022	USL League Two	12	2	—		—		12	2
Salem City	2024	USL League Two	13	1	—		1 (Note: Appearance in the 2024 USL League Two Playoffs)	0	14	1
Galway United	2025	LOI Premier Division	9	0	0	0	—		9	0
Career Total			34	3	0	0	1	0	35	3
