= Andrew Kempe =

Bermudian footballer

Personal information
- Date of birth: 26 August 2000 (age 26)
- Place of birth: Warwick, Bermuda
- Height: 1.98 m (6 ft 6 in)
- Position: Goalkeeper

Youth career
- Brooks School
- 2017–2018: GPS Massachusetts
- 2018–2019: Seacoast United

College career
Years	Team	Apps	(Gls)
2019–2020	Rhode Island Rams	6	(0)
2021–2022	Dickinson College	27	(0)
2023–2025	Temple Owls	13	(0)

Senior career*
Years	Team	Apps	(Gls)
2024	Real Central NJ (loan)		
2025	Galway United	0	(0)

International career^{‡}
2023	Bermuda U23	2	(0)
2024–	Bermuda	1	(0)
- * Club domestic league appearances and goals as of 14:34, 25 May 2025 (UTC) ‡ National team caps and goals as of 14:34, 25 May 2025 (UTC)

Andrew Kempe (born 26 August 2000) is a Bermudian professional footballer who plays as a goalkeeper who was most recently signed to League of Ireland Premier Division club Galway United. He has also played for the Bermuda national team.

Kempe was born in Warwick Parish, Bermuda and played college football with the Rhode Island Rams, Dickinson College and Temple Owls. In 2024 Kempe played for USL League Two side Real Central New Jersey on loan. In 2025 Kempe joined Irish side Galway United.

Kempe has one cap with the Bermuda national team.

== Early life ==
Kempe was born in Warwick Parish. His favourite team growing up was Manchester United. He attended and played for the soccer team of Brooks School, Massachusetts. He also spent time in the youth setups at GPS Massachusetts and Seacoast United.

== College career ==
Kempe began his college career in 2019 at the University of Rhode Island where he studied in the business program and played for their soccer team, the Rhode Island Rams.

In 2021, Kempe moved to Dickinson College, Pennsylvania where he studied International Business and Management, during which time he played for the school's soccer team, the Red Devils.

In 2023 Kempe moved to Temple University, Pennsylvania where he played for the university's soccer team the Temple Owls.

== Club career ==
Kempe went out on loan during the summer break in 2024, signing for USL League Two side Real Central New Jersey on a short-term loan.

In January 2025 Kempe travelled to Galway, Ireland to train with and go on trial for League of Ireland Premier Division side Galway United. On 7 March, Kempe signed for the 2025 season after impressing on trial.

Kempe was signed as a result of an injury to Galway United’s starting goalkeeper Brendan Clarke, Kempe served as the back-up to loanee Evan Watts during his time at the club. However due to Clarke returning from his injury sooner than expected, Kempe was relegated to third choice keeper putting him in a position where he would most likely not get much if any first team opportunities for Galway leading to Kempe departing the club less than 2 months after he joined.

== International career ==
Kempe played for the Bermuda Under-23's squad for the 2023 Island Games.

Kempe was first called up to the Bermuda senior team in 2023 for the CONCACAF Nations League where he was an unused substitute against Saint Vincent and the Grenadines and French Guiana. He made his full debut for his country coming on at halftime against Guinea in the 2024 FIFA Series.

== Personal life ==
He is the son of Alison and Nick Kempe and has a younger sister named Morgan and a younger brother named Charlie.

== Career statistics ==
As of match played 25 May 2025

Appearances and goals by national team and year
National team	Year	Apps	Goals
Bermuda	2024	1	0

== Honours ==
Individual

- Real Central New Jersey Breakout Player of the Season: 2024

== Notes ==
A.The word "soccer" is used when referring to Kempe's time playing in the United States.
