= Brian Cunningham (Irish footballer) =

Irish football player (born 2006)

Personal information
- Full name: Brian Cunningham
- Date of birth: 3 September 2006 (age 20)
- Place of birth: Headford, County Galway, Ireland
- Height: 1.81 m (5 ft 11 in)
- Position: Striker

Team information
- Current team: Treaty United
- Number: 19

Youth career
- –2021: Mervue United
- 2021–2024: Galway United

Senior career*
Years	Team	Apps	(Gls)
2023–2025	Galway United	1	(0)
2025–	Treaty United	9	(1)

International career^{‡}
2023–2024	Republic of Ireland U18		
- * Club domestic league appearances and goals as of 30 April 2026 (UTC) ‡ National team caps and goals as of 16 September 2025 (UTC)

Brian Cunningham (born 3 September 2006) is an Irish professional footballer who plays as a striker for League of Ireland First Division club Treaty United.

Cunningham was born in Headford and played youth football with Mervue United before signing for Galway United’s youth academy. He would go on to make his professional debut for Galway before signing for Treaty United in 2025.

Cunningham is a Republic of Ireland youth international.

== Youth career ==
Cunningham played for Galway side Mervue United before signing for Galway United in 2021. Cunningham would go on to represent Galway at U17 U19 and U20 level.

== Club career ==
=== Galway United ===
On 22 July 2023 Cunningham made his debut for Galway United in an FAI Cup match in a 4-1 vs Bangor Celtic.

On 1 February 2025 Cunningham was officially called up to John Caulfield’s senior squad for the 2025 season. Cunningham would go on to make his league debut later that season, coming on as a substitute in the Connacht Derby playing a single minute in United’s 1–0 loss to Sligo Rovers.

On 10 July 2025 United announced that Cunningham had departed the club by mutual consent.

=== Treaty United ===
On 10 July 2025 it was announced that Cunningham had signed for League of Ireland First Division side Treaty United.

Cunningham made his debut on 11 July 2025 in a 2–1 victory over Cobh Ramblers. Two weeks later on 25 July, Cunningham scored his first goal for Treaty in a 2–2 draw vs Athlone Town.

== Personal life ==
Brian is the younger brother of former Galway United player, Padraic Cunningham.

== Career statistics ==
=== Club ===
As of match played 24 April 2026

Appearances and goals by club, season and competition
Club	Season	League			FAI Cup		Total	
Club	Season	Division	Apps	Goals	Apps	Goals	Apps	Goals
Galway United	2023	LOI First Division	0	0	1	0	1	0
Galway United	2024	LOI Premier Division	0	0	0	0	0	0
Galway United	2025	LOI Premier Division	1	0	0	0	1	0
Galway United	Total		1	0	1	0	2	0
Treaty United	2025	LOI First Division	2	1	1	0	3	1
Treaty United	2026	LOI First Division	7	0	0	0	7	0
Treaty United	Total		9	1	1	0	10	1
Career total			10	1	2	0	12	1
