= Cillian Tollett =

Irish football player (born 2008)

Personal information
- Full name: Cillian Tollett
- Date of birth: 9 February 2008 (age 18)
- Place of birth: Oughterard, Ireland
- Height: 1.85 m (6 ft 1 in)
- Position: Striker

Team information
- Current team: Bologna

Youth career
- 2013–2022: Oughterard AFC
- 2022–2024: Galway United

Senior career*
Years	Team	Apps	(Gls)
2024–2026	Galway United	11	(0)
2026	→ Athlone Town (loan)	26	(6)
2026–	Bologna	0	(0)

International career^{‡}
2022–2023	Republic of Ireland U15	4	(0)
2023–2024	Republic of Ireland U16	6	(1)
2024–2025	Republic of Ireland U17	8	(1)
2026–	Republic of Ireland U19	5	(3)
- * Club domestic league appearances and goals as of 18:33, 18 August 2026 (UTC) ‡ National team caps and goals as of 22:24, 4 October 2026 (UTC)

Cillian Tollett (born 9 February 2008) is an Irish professional footballer who plays as a striker for Serie A club Bologna.

Tollett was born in Oughterard and played youth football with Oughterard AFC before joining the academy at Galway United. He would go on to make his professional debut with the club in 2024 at 16 years old. In 2026 he had a loan spell with Athlone Town.

Tollett is a Republic of Ireland youth international.

== Club career ==
=== Youth career ===
Tollett played for his local side Oughterard AFC from age 5, before signing for Galway United at age 14. Tollett would go on to represent Galway at U14, U15, U17 and U20 level.

=== Galway United ===
On 18 October 2024 Tollett made his debut for Galway United at the age of just 16 at Richmond Park in a 1–2 defeat to St Patrick’s Athletic.

On 10 December 2024 Tollett signed his first professional contract with Galway United.

On 5 May 2025 Tollett made his first start for Galway United in a 1–2 defeat to Bohemians at Eamonn Deacy Park. A knee ligament injury in September 2025 ended his season and he missed out on the 2025 World Cup with the Republic of Ireland under-17 team.

==== Athlone Town (loan) ====
On 13 February 2026, Tollett joined League of Ireland First Division club Athlone Town on loan until the end of the season. Tollett made his debut the same day in a 2–1 win over Finn Harps. A week later he scored his first goal in senior football, after coming off the bench away to Kerry, he scored in the 87th minute to earn his side a 1–0 victory.

=== Bologna ===
In August 2026, Tollett signed for Serie A club Bologna.

== International career ==
Tollett has been capped at multiple youth levels for the Republic of Ireland. He is also eligible to represent Australia.

Tollett was part of the under-17 squad that qualified for the 2025 FIFA U-17 World Cup which was the first time Ireland had ever qualified for the tournament. However, due to an ill-timed knee ligament injury Tollett was out of contention for the squad that went to the tournament. On 28 March 2026, Tollett scored on his Republic of Ireland U19 debut in a 3–3 draw away to Scotland U19.

== Personal life ==
His father Tulsen Tollett is an English former professional Rugby league player.

== Career statistics ==
As of match played 14 August 2026

Appearances and goals by club, season and competition
Club	Season	League			National Cup (Note: Includes FAI Cup & Coppa Italia)		Total	
Club	Season	Division	Apps	Goals	Apps	Goals	Apps	Goals
Galway United	2024	LOI Premier Division	1	0	0	0	1	0
Galway United	2025	LOI Premier Division	10	0	1	0	11	0
Galway United	2026	LOI Premier Division	0	0	0	0	0	0
Galway United	Total		11	0	1	0	12	0
Athlone Town (loan)	2026	LOI First Division	26	6	2	1	28	7
Bologna	2026–27	Serie A	0	0	0	0	0	0
Career total			37	6	3	1	40	7
