= Monksland =

Monksland Fearann na Manach
- Townland
- Location in Ireland
- Coordinates: 53°25′21″N 7°59′53″W
- Country: Ireland
- Province: Connacht
- County: County Roscommon
- Dáil Éireann: Roscommon–Galway

Area
  - Total: 5.1 km^{2} (2.0 sq mi)
- Time zone: UTC+0 (WET)
  - Summer (DST): UTC-1 (IST (WEST))

Monksland (Irish: Fearann na Manach) is a townland and suburb of Athlone. The townland lies in County Roscommon to the west of the River Shannon, on the border between the provinces of Connacht and Leinster.

Developments in the largely residential suburban area have included a supermarket, a medical centre, other retail space and a business park (Monksland Business Park). As of the 2011 census, the townland of Monksland had a population of 3,306 people.
