= Vincent Borden =

American soccer player

Personal information
- Full name: Vincent Russell Borden
- Date of birth: February 21, 1999 (age 27)
- Height: 6 ft 3 in (1.91 m)
- Position: Midfielder

Team information
- Current team: Kerry
- Number: 24

Youth career
- Dinamo Zagreb
- HAŠK
- New York Red Bulls Academy

College career
Years	Team	Apps	(Gls)
2017–2021	Rutgers Scarlet Knights	72	(4)

Senior career*
Years	Team	Apps	(Gls)
2019	New York Red Bulls II	0	(0)
2021–2022	Rudar Velenje	15	(0)
2023–2025	Galway United	86	(14)
2026–	Kerry	16	(1)
- * Club domestic league appearances and goals as of 16:12, July 2, 2026 (UTC)

Vincent Russell Borden (born February 21, 1999) is an American professional soccer player who plays as a midfielder for League of Ireland First Division club Kerry.

== Career ==
At the age of 11, Borden joined the youth team of Croatian club Dinamo Zagreb, later moving to fellow Croatian club HAŠK. At the age of 16 he returned to the US to sign for the New York Red Bulls Academy. He also played college soccer at Rutgers University.

He signed for Slovenian club Rudar Velenje, but left in October 2022 after becoming injured.

Borden signed for Irish club Galway United in January 2023. He re-signed with the club for the 2024 season, and again for the 2025 season. On November 23, 2025, the club confirmed Borden's departure from the club. On November 27, 2025, it was announced that Borden would be joining League of Ireland First Division club Kerry ahead of their 2026 season.
