= Johnny Kenny =

Irish footballer

Personal information
- Date of birth: 6 June 2003 (age 23)
- Place of birth: Riverstown, County Sligo, Ireland
- Height: 6 ft 2 in (1.88 m)
- Position: Forward

Team information
- Current team: Preston North End
- Number: 38

Youth career
- Arrow Harps
- 2016–2021: Sligo Rovers

Senior career*
Years	Team	Apps	(Gls)
2021–2022	Sligo Rovers	31	(11)
2022	Celtic B	4	(2)
2022–2026	Celtic	23	(5)
2022	→ Queen's Park (loan)	12	(0)
2023	→ Shamrock Rovers (loan)	30	(5)
2024	→ Shamrock Rovers (loan)	29	(13)
2026	→ Bolton Wanderers (loan)	14	(6)
2026–	Preston North End	5	(2)

International career^{‡}
2021–2022	Republic of Ireland U19	5	(4)
2023–2024	Republic of Ireland U21	8	(1)
2025–	Republic of Ireland	2	(0)
- * Club domestic league appearances and goals as of 23:47, 18 October 2026 (UTC) ‡ National team caps and goals as of 23:42, 31 march 2026 (GMT)

Johnny Kenny (born 6 June 2003) is an Irish professional footballer who plays as a forward for EFL Championship club Preston North End and the Republic of Ireland national team.

== Club career ==
=== Sligo Rovers ===
In January 2021, Kenny signed his first professional contract with Sligo Rovers. He made his debut in March, in a 1–1 draw with Dundalk. One month later, he scored his first senior goal against Finn Harps. Like his father Johnny also scored in European football for Sligo.

=== Celtic ===
Kenny signed a five-year deal with Celtic in January 2022 for an undisclosed fee.

==== Queens Park loan ====
Kenny signed for Scottish Championship side Queen's Park on a season long loan deal in August 2022. After failing to score in his 12 appearances for the club, his loan spell was cut short in December 2022.

==== Shamrock Rovers loans ====
On 28 December 2022, it was announced that Kenny would be joining League of Ireland Premier Division club Shamrock Rovers on loan for their 2023 season. After returning to Celtic at the end of his loan spell, it was announced on 21 January 2024 that Kenny would return to Shamrock Rovers on another loan deal for the 2024 season. On 7 November 2024, Kenny scored in a 2–1 victory over The New Saints in the UEFA Conference League. On 12 December, he scored two more goals for Shamrock Rovers in their 3–0 win over Borac Banja Luka in the same competition.

==== Return from loans ====
After impressive form in the UEFA Conference League during his loan spell, Kenny returned to Celtic in January, making his senior competitive debut for the club on 11 January 2025, replacing Adam Idah from the bench in a 4–1 win away to Ross County, in which he assisted the final goal of the game for Luke McCowan. On 14 May 2025, Kenny made his first start for the club and scored his first goal for the club in a 5–1 win away to Aberdeen at Pittodrie Stadium.

In June 2025, Celtic reportedly turned down a £500,000 bid from EFL League One club Bolton Wanderers for Kenny. On 8 August 2025, Kenny signed a new four-year-contract with Celtic until the summer of 2029. On the 23rd of August, Kenny scored his first goal at Celtic Park. Coming on as a second-half substitute, he contributed the third goal in a 3–0 win over Livingston.

The departure of Brendan Rodgers and the subsequent arrival of Martin O’Neill provided Kenny with an opportunity to lead the Celtic attack. Kenny scored twice in a 4–0 victory over Falkirk on 29 October 2025, in Martin O'Neill's first game back at Parkhead. He scored the first goal in a 3–1 Scottish League Cup semi-final win over Rangers. His header coming in the 25th minute from an Arne Engels corner. He continued his goal scoring form with the opening goal in a 4–0 home win over Kilmarnock on 9 November 2025.

==== Bolton Wanderers loan ====
On 2 February 2026, Kenny signed for EFL League One club Bolton Wanderers on loan until the end of the season, rejecting potential loan moves to Danish league leaders Aarhus and German club Schalke 04 in the process. He made his debut on 14 February 2026, in a 1–1 draw away to Lincoln City at Sincil Bank. On 28 February 2026, he scored his first goal for the club in a 5–1 victory away to Exeter City. He scored 6 goals in 14 appearances during his loan spell to help Bolton to promotion to the EFL Championship.

=== Preston North End ===
On 1 September 2026, Kenny joined EFL Championship club Preston North End on a permanent transfer.

== International career ==
=== Underage ===
In November 2021, Kenny made his debut for the Republic of Ireland under-19 team, scoring in a 3–2 victory over Montenegro. Kenny also scored on his Republic of Ireland under-21 debut in a 2–1 win against Iceland in March 2023.

=== Senior ===
On 1 September 2025, Kenny was called up to the senior Republic of Ireland squad for the first time, replacing the injured Troy Parrott for their 2026 FIFA World Cup qualification fixtures against Hungary and Armenia. On 16 November 2025, Kenny made his debut as a substitute in a 3–2 win away to Hungary in a 2026 World Cup qualifier, securing second place in the group and progression to the qualifying playoffs. Kenny's appearance made him the first player from County Sligo to be capped by the international team since Paul McGee in 1980.

== Personal life ==
His father, Johnny Snr. was also a professional footballer and played for Sligo Rovers in the 1990s. He is first cousins with brothers Liam Kerrigan and Sean Kerrigan, who are both also professional footballers. His brothers Ciaran, Niall and Patrick are members of Shamrock Gaels GAA club and were key contributors as they won the 2025 Sligo Senior Football Championship, ending a 33-year wait.

Kenny grew up around the Riverstown area in Sligo alongside fellow footballer Owen Elding.

== Career statistics ==
As of match played 17 October 2026

Appearances and goals by club, season and competition
Club	Season	League			National cup (Note: Includes FAI Cup & Scottish Cup)		League cup (Note: Includes Scottish League Cup)		Europe (Note: Includes UEFA Conference League & Europa League)		Other		Total	
Club	Season	Division	Apps	Goals	Apps	Goals	Apps	Goals	Apps	Goals	Apps	Goals	Apps	Goals
Sligo Rovers	2021	LOI Premier Division	32	11	1	0	–		1 (Note: Appearances in the UEFA Europa Conference League)	1	–		34	12
Celtic B	2022–23	Lowland Football League	4	2	–						2 (Note: Appearance in the Scottish Challenge Cup)	1	6	3
Celtic	2021–22	Scottish Premiership	0	0	0	0	0	0	0	0	–		0	0
Celtic	2022–23	Scottish Premiership	0	0	0	0	0	0	0	0	–		0	0
Celtic	2023–24	Scottish Premiership	0	0	0	0	0	0	0	0	–		0	0
Celtic	2024–25	Scottish Premiership	8	1	2	0	–		0	0	–		10	1
Celtic	2025–26	Scottish Premiership	15	4	1	1	3	1	3 (Note: Appearances in the UEFA Europa League)	0	–		22	6
Celtic	2026–27	Scottish Premiership	0	0	–		0	0	0	0	–		0	0
Celtic	Total		23	5	3	1	3	1	3	0	–		32	7
Queen's Park (loan)	2022–23	Scottish Championship	12	0	0	0	–		–		–		12	0
Shamrock Rovers (loan)	2023	LOI Premier Division	30	5	1	0	–		4 (Note: 2 appearances in the UEFA Champions League; 2 appearances in the UEFA Europa Conference League)	0	2 (Note: 1 appearance in the President of Ireland's Cup; 1 appearance, 1 goal in the Leinster Senior Cup)	1	37	6
Shamrock Rovers (loan)	2024	LOI Premier Division	29	13	1	0	–		9 (Note: 3 appearances, 2 goals in the UEFA Champions League; 6 appearances, 5 goals in the UEFA Conference League)	7	0	0	39	20
Bolton Wanderers (loan)	2025–26	EFL League One	14	6	–		–		–		0	0	14	6
Preston North End	2026–27	EFL Championship	5	2	0	0	–		–		–		5	2
Career total			140	44	6	1	3	1	17	8	4	2	179	56

=== International ===
As of match played 31 March 2026

Appearances and goals by national team and year
National team	Year	Apps	Goals
Republic of Ireland	2025	1	0
Republic of Ireland	2026	1	0
Total		2	0

== Honours ==
=== Club ===
Shamrock Rovers

- League of Ireland Premier Division: 2023

Celtic

- Scottish Premiership: 2024–25, 2025–26

Bolton Wanderers

- EFL League One play-offs: 2026

=== Individual ===
- PFAI Premier Division Team of the Year: 2024
