= Liam Kerrigan =

Irish footballer (born 2000)

Personal information
- Full name: Liam Thomas Kerrigan
- Date of birth: 9 May 2000 (age 26)
- Place of birth: Sligo, Ireland
- Height: 1.71 m (5 ft 7 in)
- Positions: Midfielder; winger; striker

Team information
- Current team: Renate
- Number: 47

Youth career
- 2015–2018: Sligo Rovers

Senior career*
| Years | Team | Apps | (Gls) |
| 2018–2019 | Sligo Rovers | 23 | (0) |
| 2019–2022 | UCD | 74 | (20) |
| 2022–2025 | Como | 12 | (1) |
| 2024 | → Novara (loan) | 9 | (0) |
| 2024–2025 | → Beveren (loan) | 25 | (1) |
| 2025–2026 | Ternana | 16 | (4) |
| 2026– | Renate | 8 | (1) |

International career
| 2022 | Republic of Ireland U21 | 3 | (1) |
- * Club domestic league appearances and goals as of 09:24, 19 October 2026 (UTC)

Liam Thomas Kerrigan (born 9 May 2000) is an Irish professional footballer who plays as a forward for Serie C Group A club AC Renate.

== Club career ==
Tubbercurry, County Sligo native Kerrigan started his career with Sligo Rovers. After three years with UCD, he signed for Como in Serie B in July 2022. On 21 August 2022, Kerrigan made his league debut for the club and also scored his first goal for the club in a 2–2 draw away to Pisa. Kerrigan suffered a long-term injury in September 2022, tearing his anterior cruciate ligament. He made his return on 13 August 2023, when he made his first appearance in just under a year by coming off the bench in a 1–0 loss away to Serie A side Lecce in the Coppa Italia.

On 26 January 2024, Kerrigan moved on loan to Serie C club Novara until the end of the season.

On 30 August 2024, Kerrigan signed for Belgian side Beveren on loan.

On 21 August 2025, Kerrigan signed a two-year contract with Serie C side Ternana. He scored four goals in 20 appearances with Ternana, before departing the club at the end of the season after they entered bankruptcy, with the squad not paid several months of their wages.

On 14 July 2026, Kerrigan signed a two-year contract with Serie C club Renate.

== Personal life ==
His brother Sean Kerrigan is a professional footballer. The pair are first cousins of Johnny Kenny, who is also a professional footballer, playing for Scottish Premiership champions Celtic.

== Career statistics ==
As of match played on 11 October 2026

Appearances and goals by club, season and competition
| Club | Season | League | | | National cup (Note: Includes FAI Cup, Coppa Italia & Belgian Cup) | | League cup (Note: Includes League of Ireland Cup & Coppa Italia Serie C) | | Other | | Total | |
| Club | Season | Division | Apps | Goals | Apps | Goals | Apps | Goals | Apps | Goals | Apps | Goals |
|---|---|---|---|---|---|---|---|---|---|---|---|---|
| Sligo Rovers | 2018 | LOI Premier Division | 11 | 0 | 0 | 0 | 0 | 0 | 1 (Note: Appearances in the Scottish Challenge Cup) | 0 | 12 | 0 |
| Sligo Rovers | 2019 | LOI Premier Division | 12 | 0 | — | | 1 | 0 | — | | 13 | 0 |
| Sligo Rovers | Total | | 23 | 0 | 0 | 0 | 1 | 0 | 1 | 0 | 25 | 0 |
| UCD | 2019 | LOI Premier Division | 8 | 1 | 2 | 4 | — | | 0 (Note: Appearances in the Leinster Senior Cup) | 0 | 10 | 5 |
| UCD | 2020 | LOI First Division | 19 | 5 | 1 | 0 | — | | 1 (Note: Appearances in the 2020 League of Ireland First Division Promotion play-offs) | 0 | 21 | 5 |
| UCD | 2021 | LOI First Division | 28 | 12 | 3 | 1 | — | | 4 (Note: Appearances in the 2021 League of Ireland First Division Promotion play-offs) | 0 | 35 | 13 |
| UCD | 2022 | LOI Premier Division | 19 | 2 | — | | — | | — | | 19 | 2 |
| UCD | Total | | 74 | 20 | 6 | 5 | — | | 5 | 0 | 85 | 25 |
| Como | 2022–23 | Serie B | 4 | 1 | 1 | 0 | — | | — | | 5 | 1 |
| Como | 2023–24 | Serie B | 8 | 0 | 1 | 0 | — | | — | | 9 | 0 |
| Como | 2024–25 | Serie A | 0 | 0 | 0 | 0 | — | | — | | 0 | 0 |
| Como | 2025–26 | Serie A | — | | 0 | 0 | — | | — | | 0 | 0 |
| Como | Total | | 12 | 1 | 2 | 0 | — | | – | | 14 | 1 |
| Novara (loan) | 2023–24 | Serie C | 9 | 0 | — | | — | | — | | 9 | 0 |
| Beveren (loan) | 2024–25 | Challenger Pro League | 25 | 1 | 2 | 0 | — | | — | | 27 | 1 |
| Ternana | 2025–26 | Serie C | 16 | 4 | — | | 4 | 0 | 0 (Note: Appearances in 2025–26 Serie C Promotion Playoffs) | 0 | 20 | 4 |
| Renate | 2026–27 | Serie C | 8 | 1 | — | | 1 | 2 | — | | 9 | 3 |
| Career total | | | 167 | 27 | 10 | 5 | 6 | 2 | 6 | 0 | 177 | 34 |
