= Jeannot Esua =

Cameroonian professional footballer (born 1996)

Personal information
- Date of birth: 6 August 1996 (age 30)
- Place of birth: Cameroon
- Height: 1.70 m (5 ft 7 in)
- Position: Right-back

Team information
- Current team: Sligo Rovers

Youth career
- –2017: Rainbow Bamenda

Senior career*
| Years | Team | Apps | (Gls) |
| 2017 | Orange County SC | 11 | (1) |
| 2018 | Rainbow Bamenda | | |
| 2019–2021 | FC Edmonton | 47 | (1) |
| 2022 | PEPO | 24 | (0) |
| 2023 | EIF | 24 | (4) |
| 2024–2025 | Galway United | 61 | (0) |
| 2026– | Sligo Rovers | 24 | (1) |
- * Club domestic league appearances and goals as of 11:37, 10 November 2026 (UTC)

Jeannot Esua (born 6 August 1996) is a Cameroonian professional footballer who plays as a right-back for League of Ireland Premier Division club Sligo Rovers.

== Club career ==
=== North America ===
On 5 June 2017, Esua joined United Soccer League club Orange County SC from Cameroonian side Rainbow Bamenda. He made eleven league appearances that season, scoring one goal.

On 22 February 2019, Esua signed with Canadian Premier League side FC Edmonton. He made 21 league appearances that season and two in the Canadian Championship. Esua was subsequently named the club's Player of the Year by the staff and players. On 27 November 2019, Esua re-signed with Edmonton for the 2020 season. He signed a further deal for the 2021 season in December 2020.

=== Finland ===
In February 2022, Esua moved to Finland and signed a deal for the 2022 season with PEPO, in second-tier Ykkönen.

During the 2023 season, Esua played for fellow Ykkönen club Ekenäs IF (EIF). At the end of the season, Esua helped the club to win a promotion to Veikkausliiga for the first time in 90 years, and only the second time in the club's entire history.

=== Ireland ===
On 16 January 2024, Esua signed for League of Ireland Premier Division club Galway United. On 21 November 2025, Esua confirmed his departure from the club, having made 64 appearances in all competitions in his two seasons at the club.

On 29 November 2025, Esua signed for fellow Irish club Sligo Rovers ahead of the 2026 season, on a two-year-contract. He scored 1 goal in 26 appearances in 2026 as the club finished bottom of the league and were relegated to play in the League of Ireland First Division for the first time since 2006.

== Career statistics ==
As of match played on 15 August 2026

Appearances and goals by club, season and competition
| Club | Season | League | | | National cup (Note: Includes U.S. Open Cup, Canadian Championship, Suomen Cup & FAI Cup) | | Other | | Total | |
| Club | Season | Division | Apps | Goals | Apps | Goals | Apps | Goals | Apps | Goals |
|---|---|---|---|---|---|---|---|---|---|---|
| Orange County SC | 2017 | USL Championship | 11 | 1 | 1 | 0 | – | | 12 | 1 |
| FC Edmonton | 2019 | Canadian Premier League | 21 | 0 | 2 | 0 | – | | 23 | 0 |
| FC Edmonton | 2020 | Canadian Premier League | 7 | 0 | 0 | 0 | – | | 7 | 0 |
| FC Edmonton | 2021 | Canadian Premier League | 19 | 1 | 1 | 0 | – | | 20 | 1 |
| FC Edmonton | Total | | 47 | 1 | 3 | 0 | – | | 50 | 1 |
| PEPO Lappeenranta | 2022 | Ykkönen | 24 | 0 | 2 | 1 | 0 | 0 | 26 | 1 |
| Ekenäs IF | 2023 | Ykkönen | 24 | 4 | 4 | 0 | 4 (Note: Includes Ykköscup) | 1 | 32 | 5 |
| Galway United | 2024 | LOI Premier Division | 27 | 0 | 1 | 0 | – | | 28 | 0 |
| Galway United | 2025 | LOI Premier Division | 34 | 0 | 2 | 0 | – | | 36 | 0 |
| Galway United | Total | | 61 | 0 | 3 | 0 | – | | 64 | 0 |
| Sligo Rovers | 2026 | LOI Premier Division | 24 | 1 | 2 | 0 | – | | 26 | 1 |
| Career total | | | 191 | 7 | 15 | 1 | 4 | 1 | 206 | 9 |

== Honours ==
EIF

- Ykkönen: 2023

Individual

- FC Edmonton Player of the Year: 2019
