= Jeremy Sivi =

English footballer

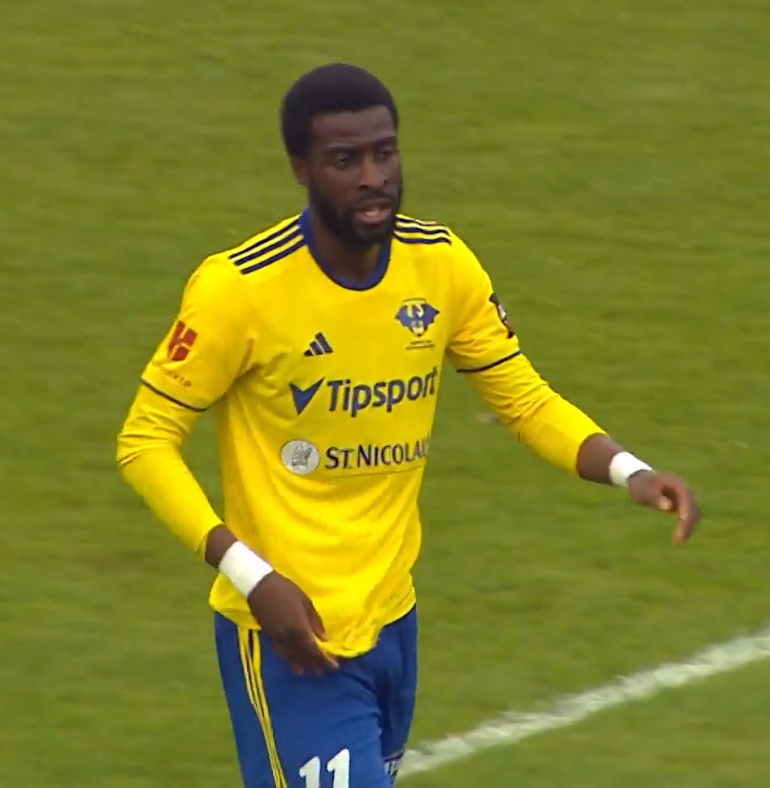
- Sivi after scoring a goal against Banska Bystrica

Personal information
- Full name: Jeremy Kilongo Sivi
- Date of birth: 18 July 2002 (age 24)
- Place of birth: London, England
- Height: 6 ft 3 in (1.90 m)
- Position: Winger

Team information
- Current team: Salisbury
- Number: 11

Youth career
- –2019: Leyton Orient

Senior career*
Years	Team	Apps	(Gls)
2019–2020	Leyton Orient	0	(0)
2019–2020	→ Harlow Town (loan)	11	(1)
2020	Harlow Town	4	(0)
2021–2024	Middlesbrough	0	(0)
2023–2024	→ Harrogate Town (loan)	17	(0)
2024–2025	Sutton United	20	(2)
2025	Zemplín Michalovce	14	(2)
2025	Galway United	8	(0)
2026	Loznica	4	(0)
2026–	Salisbury	0	(0)
- * Club domestic league appearances and goals as of 22 August 2026

Jeremy Sivi (born 18 July 2002) is an English professional footballer who plays as a winger for National League South club Salisbury.

== Club career ==
Having played youth football for Leyton Orient, Sivi joined Harlow Town on loan in December 2019, where he scored once in 11 league appearances, but was released by Orient at the end of the season. He returned to Harlow Town in October 2020, and made 4 league appearances during this spell at the club.

=== Middlesbrough ===
After playing with Onside Football Academy, he signed a professional contract with EFL Championship club Middlesbrough on 25 May 2021. He made his debut for the club on 10 August 2021 as a substitute in a 3–0 EFL Cup defeat to Blackpool.

In May 2023, Sivi signed a new contract with Middlesbrough, valid until summer 2025. On 1 September 2023, Sivi signed for Harrogate Town on loan until January 2024.

Following the conclusion of the 2023–24 season, Sivi was confirmed to be departing Middlesbrough.

=== Sutton United ===
On 23 June 2024, Sivi agreed to join National League side Sutton United on a one-year deal.

=== Zemplín ===
Sivi joined Zemplín Michalovce on 25 January 2025, signing a two-year contract. He scored his first goal for Zemplín in a 4:2 loss to MFK Skalica.

=== Galway United ===
On 12 August 2025, Sivi signed for League of Ireland Premier Division side Galway United. Sivi made his debut for Galway on 15 August in the FAI Cup in a 4–0 win over Salthill Devon.

=== Loznica ===
On 20 January 2026, Sivi joined Serbian First League side Loznica on a free transfer.

=== Salisbury ===
On 22 August 2026, Sivi signed for National League South side Salisbury.

== Style of play ==
Sivi plays as a winger, predominantly on the right.
