= Jack Brady =

Irish professional footballer

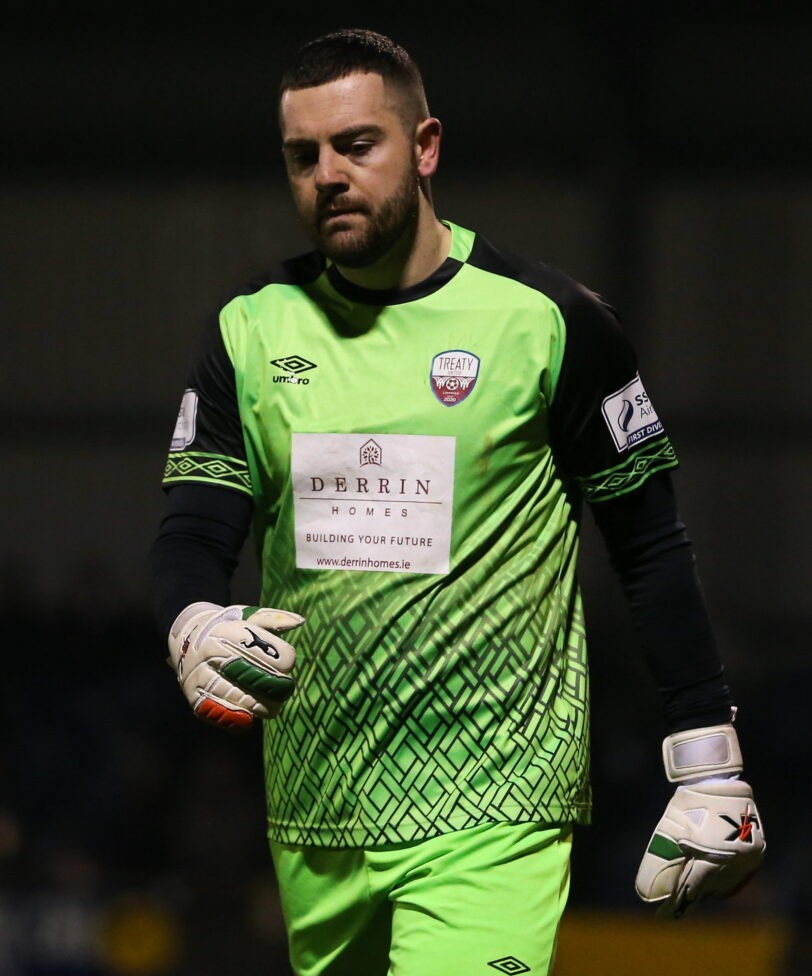
- Brady playing for Treaty United in 2022.

Personal information
- Date of birth: 17 December 1996 (age 29)
- Place of birth: Dublin, Ireland
- Position: Goalkeeper

Team information
- Current team: Treaty United

Youth career
- Lough Derg FC
- –2013: St. Kevin's Boys
- 2013–2015: Shelbourne

Senior career*
| Years | Team | Apps | (Gls) |
| 2015–2017 | Shelbourne | 20 | (0) |
| 2017–2018 | Longford Town | 7 | (0) |
| 2018–2019 | Limerick | 30 | (0) |
| 2020–2021 | Shelbourne | 9 | (0) |
| 2022 | Treaty United | 29 | (0) |
| 2023–2024 | Longford Town | 55 | (0) |
| 2024 | Galway United | 0 | (0) |
| 2025 | Drogheda United | 1 | (0) |
| 2026- | Treaty United | 34 | (0) |
- * Club domestic league appearances and goals as of 26 August 2026

Jack Brady (17 December 1996) is an Irish footballer who plays as a goalkeeper for League of Ireland First Division side Treaty United.

== Early life ==
Brady was born in Dublin on 17 December 1996. Brady was educated at St Anne's Community College in Killaloe.

== Club career ==
Brady spent his youth years at Dublin clubs St. Kevin's Boys, and Shelbourne. He started to appear on the bench frequently during the 2015 season and made his debut in a 2–0 home win against Cobh Ramblers. He went on to make 20 appearances for the club.

In 2017, Longford Town signed Brady until the end of the season. While there he made seven league appearances, and was usually used as a substitute.

In 2018, Brady moved back south and signed for Limerick F.C. While there he was a regular starter and made 30 league appearances before the club's liquidation.

In 2020 Brady returned to Shelbourne.

Brady signed for new Limerick club Treaty United in 2021. Brady made 31 appearances in all competitions, keeping eleven clean sheets, as the club reached the Semi-Finals of both the FAI Cup and First Division play-offs.

Brady departed from Treaty United at the end of the 2022 season to return to Longford Town. He departed the midland's club in July 2024. In the same month, Brady joined Galway United by signing a contract expiring in November 2024.

Brady signed for Drogheda United in 2025. He made three appearances in all competitions for the club, including a substitute appearance against former club Shelbourne in the Men's President Cup Final.

Brady returned to Treaty United ahead of the 2026 season.
