= Karl O'Sullivan =

Irish professional footballer

Personal information
- Date of birth: 31 October 1999 (age 26)
- Place of birth: Limerick, Ireland
- Height: 1.81 m (5 ft 11 in)
- Position: Winger

Team information
- Current team: Heidelberg United FC
- Number: 2

Youth career
- -2015: Glin Rovers
- 2015: Limerick
- 2016: Kerry District League
- 2017–2019: Limerick

Senior career*
Years	Team	Apps	(Gls)
2017–2019	Limerick	53	(3)
2020–2021	Finn Harps	46	(6)
2021–2023	Sligo Rovers	43	(3)
2024	Galway United	30	(0)
2025-	Treaty United	29	(1)
2026-	Heidelberg United FC	15	(0)

International career^{‡}
2019	Republic of Ireland U21	2	(0)
- * Club domestic league appearances and goals as of 4 September 2026 ‡ National team caps and goals as of 21 August 2021

Karl O'Sullivan is an Irish professional footballer who plays for Heidelberg United. He plays as a right midfielder and occasionally as a right-back.

== Club career ==
O'Sullivan started his career with Limerick, starting with the under-19's then progressing up to the first team. He made his debut against Shamrock Rovers in a 2–1 defeat. He scored his first goal in a 6–3 away win against Waterford, scoring in the 22nd minute to make it 3–0. In January 2020 O'Sullivan transferred to Finn Harps, following Limerick's demise. He scored in his second game for the club, the winner against Sligo Rovers.

In December 2021 Sligo Rovers announced that they had signed O'Sullivan on a two-year contract.

O'Sullivan signed for Galway United in 2024. On 12 November 2024, it was announced that O'Sullivan had departed after 1 season with the club.

== International career ==
In February 2019, O'Sullivan was called up to the Irish U21 side for a friendly again the Irish national amateur team. He came on as a substitute in the 92nd minute in the 1–0 win. He was then called up again later that year for a match against China U23, this time starting the match as his side won 4–1.

== Career statistics ==
As of match played on 4 September 2026

Appearances and goals by club, season and competition
Club	Season	League			Domestic Cup		League Cup		Other		Total	
Club	Season	Division	Apps	Goals	Apps	Goals	Apps	Goals	Apps	Goals	Apps	Goals
Limerick	2017	Premier Division	1	0	0	0	0	0	0	0	1	0
Limerick	2018	Premier Division	27	1	2	0	1	0	3	0	33	1
Limerick	2019	First Division	25	2	2	2	1	0	0	0	28	4
Limerick	Total		53	3	4	2	2	0	3	0	62	5
Finn Harps	2020	Premier Division	14	2	1	0	–		0	0	15	2
Finn Harps	2021	Premier Division	32	4	3	0	–		1	0	36	4
Finn Harps	Total		46	6	4	0	–		1	0	51	6
Sligo Rovers	2022	Premier Division	29	3	0	0	–		6 (Note: 6 appearances in UEFA Europa Conference League)	0	29	3
Sligo Rovers	2023	Premier Division	14	0	0	0	–		0	0	20	0
Sligo Rovers	Total		43	3	0	0	–		6	0	49	3
Galway United	2024	Premier Division	29	0	1	0	–		0	0	30	0
Treaty United	2025	First Division	29	1	0	0	–		0	0	29	1
Heidelberg United	2026	NPL Victoria	15	0	3	0	–		–		18	0
Career total			215	13	12	2	1	0	9	0	237	15
