= Bobby Burns (footballer) =

Northern Irish professional footballer

Personal information
- Full name: Robert Joseph Burns
- Date of birth: 7 October 1999 (age 27)
- Place of birth: Antrim, Northern Ireland
- Height: 5 ft 8 in (1.73 m)
- Positions: Left back; midfielder

Team information
- Current team: Dundalk
- Number: 3

Youth career
- Lisburn Distillery
- Cliftonville
- 2015–2016: Glenavon

Senior career*
Years	Team	Apps	(Gls)
2016–2018	Glenavon	39	(5)
2017	→ Knockbreda (loan)	8	(8)
2018–2020	Heart of Midlothian	5	(1)
2018–2019	→ Livingston (loan)	8	(0)
2019–2020	→ Newcastle Jets (loan)	16	(0)
2020–2021	Barrow	0	(0)
2020	→ Glentoran (loan)	3	(0)
2021–2024	Glentoran	106	(15)
2024–2025	Galway United	44	(1)
2026–	Dundalk	36	(2)

International career^{‡}
2015	Northern Ireland U17	2	(0)
2018	Northern Ireland U19	3	(0)
2018–2020	Northern Ireland U21	9	(0)
- * Club domestic league appearances and goals as of 16:46, 10 November 2026 (UTC) ‡ National team caps and goals as of 21:07, 12 November 2020 (UTC)

Robert Joseph Burns (born 7 October 1999) is a Northern Irish professional footballer who plays as a left back or midfielder for League of Ireland Premier Division club Dundalk.

== Early and personal life ==
Burns was born in Antrim. He was the Head Boy at St. Malachy's College, and had intended to study mathematics at University College Dublin or Queen's University Belfast before becoming a professional footballer.

== Club career ==
=== Glenavon ===
Burns played youth football for Lisburn Distillery and Cliftonville before joining Glenavon in June 2015.

Burns made his senior debut for Glenavon in the 2015–16 season final game against Linfield at 16 years old. The following season he went on loan with Knockbreda in January 2016. The club were battling relegation but Burns played attacking midfield and scored 8 goals in the final 8 league games to steer the club away from relegation on the final day of the season.

Burns then returned to Glenavon for the 2017–18 season. At Glenavon he scored 8 goals in 41 appearances, was nominated for the NI Football Writers' Association Young Player of the Year Award, and won Glenavon's Young Player of the Year and Fans' Player of the Year awards. Whilst at Glenavon he received offers from English clubs Rochdale and Bristol City but decided to stay at home and complete his A Level qualifications in school first.

=== Heart of Midlothian ===
Burns signed a three-year contract with Scottish club Heart of Midlothian in May 2018, for an undisclosed fee, with effect from June 2018. He described his professional football career as a 'dream come true', and stated he wanted to break into the Northern Ireland senior squad.

After being involved in pre-season fixtures, he made his competitive debut for the club on 18 July 2018, in a Scottish League Cup game against Cove Rangers, where he played the full 90 minutes in a 2–1 victory. In August 2018, Hearts loaned Burns to Livingston. His loan ended in January 2019.

Burns then returned to Hearts in January 2019. He played a number of games before the end of the season, including an Edinburgh derby and a Scottish Cup semi-final. Burns scored his first goal for Hearts in a 2–1 defeat against Aberdeen. He was then listed as an unused substitute for the 2019 Scottish Cup Final, which Hearts lost 2–1 to Celtic.

==== Loan to Newcastle Jets ====
In September 2019 he moved on loan to Australian side Newcastle Jets. He said he hoped the move would earn him his first senior international cap. Due to the shutdown of the league due to the COVID-19 pandemic, Burns left Australia in April 2020.

=== Barrow ===
On 4 August 2020, Burns joined League Two side Barrow.

On 3 October 2020 he moved on loan to Glentoran. On 2 November he suffered a double leg break during a match.

On 28 July 2021, Burns had his contract terminated by mutual consent.

=== Glentoran ===
On 31 July 2021, three days after his departure from Barrow, Burns returned to Glentoran on a permanent contract. He was attacked by teammmate Aaron McCarey during a match on 16 October 2021.

Burns was seriously injured during a match on 28 October 2023 after colliding with pitch side advertising hoardings, eventually being stretchered off.

On 7 May 2024, it was announced that Burns would be one of ten players departing Glentoran upon the expiry of their contracts.

=== Galway United ===
On 26 June 2024, Burns joined League of Ireland team Galway United. After a year and a half at the club, it was announced in November 2025 that Burns would be departing Galway following the end of his contract, having turned down a new multi-year contract offer by the club, in favour of "an exciting opportunity elsewhere".

=== Dundalk ===
On 15 December 2025 Burns signed for recently promoted League of Ireland Premier Division side Dundalk ahead of the 2026 season.

== International career ==
He has been capped by Northern Ireland at under-19 and under-21 levels, and trained with the senior team.

== Playing style ==
Burns was primarily a central midfielder, but also played as a left defender and as an attacker.
