= Hugo Cunha (footballer, born 2001) =

Portuguese footballer (born 2001)

Hugo Da Cunha
Personal information
- Full name: Hugo Alberto Pires da Cunha
- Date of birth: 6 September 2001 (age 25)
- Place of birth: Viana do Castelo, Portugal
- Height: 1.98 m (6 ft 6 in)
- Position: Goalkeeper

Team information
- Current team: Galway United
- Number: 16

Youth career
- 2009–2011: Artur Rego AD
- 2011–2014: Perspectiva em Jogo AD
- 2014–2021: Sporting CP
- 2021–2023: Famalicão

Senior career*
Years	Team	Apps	(Gls)
2023–2026	Famalicão	0	(0)
2026–	Galway United	14	(0)

International career^{‡}
2017	Portugal U17	1	(0)
- * Club domestic league appearances and goals as of 16:43, 31 October 2026 (UTC) ‡ National team caps and goals as of 21:45, 18 August 2026 (UTC)

Hugo Alberto Pires da Cunha (born 6 September 2001) is a Portuguese professional footballer who plays as a goalkeeper for League of Ireland Premier Division club Galway United.

== Club career ==
=== Early career ===
Cunha was born in Viana do Castelo, Portugal and started playing football with local teams Artur Rego AD and Perspectiva em Jogo AD before joining the academy of Sporting CP in 2014, where he remained until 2021 when he signed for the academy of Famalicão in 2021.

=== Famalicão ===
In July 2021, Cunha signed for Primeira Liga club Famalicão, where he would initially play for the under-23 team. In July 2023, after impressing with the U23 team, he was promoted to the first team by manager João Pedro Sousa, as well as signing a new contract that would run until June 2026.

=== Galway United ===
On 26 January 2026, Cunha signed for League of Ireland Premier Division club Galway United. With loanee goalkeeper Evan Watts having been an ever present until returning to his parent club in July, Cunha remained an unused substitute in the first 22 league games of the season, before making his debut in senior football on 3 July 2026 in a 3–0 defeat to St Patrick's Athletic at Richmond Park. On 14 August 2026, Cunha saved a penalty in the shootout to win his side the game in a 5–4 victory on penalties after a 1–1 draw with Bray Wanderers in the FAI Cup.

== International career ==
On 12 December 2017, he made his international debut for Portugal U17, in a 3–1 loss away to Turkey U17 in a friendly.

== Career statistics ==
As of match played on 30 October 2026

Appearances and goals by club, season and competition
Club	Season	League			National cup (Note: Includes Taça de Portugal & FAI Cup)		Other		Total	
Club	Season	Division	Apps	Goals	Apps	Goals	Apps	Goals	Apps	Goals
Famalicão	2023–24	Primeira Liga	0	0	0	0	–		0	0
Famalicão	2024–25	Primeira Liga	0	0	0	0	–		0	0
Famalicão	2025–26	Primeira Liga	0	0	0	0	–		0	0
Famalicão	Total		0	0	0	0	0	0	0	0
Galway United	2026	LOI Premier Division	14	0	4	0	–		18	0
Career Total			14	0	4	0	0	0	18	0
