= Mitchell Bates =

Welsh footballer (born 2004)

Mitchel Bates
Personal information
- Full name: Mitchel David Brinley Bates
- Date of birth: 20 February 2004 (age 22)
- Place of birth: Swansea, Wales
- Height: 1.80 m (5 ft 11 in)
- Position: Midfielder

Team information
- Current team: Briton Ferry Llansawel

Youth career
- Swansea City
- West End
- 2020–2023: Briton Ferry Llansawel
- 2023–2026: Swansea City

Senior career*
| Years | Team | Apps | (Gls) |
| 2024–2026 | Swansea City | 0 | (0) |
| 2025 | → Truro City (loan) | 4 | (0) |
| 2025–2026 | → Briton Ferry Llansawel (loan) | 25 | (0) |
| 2026 | Galway United | 0 | (0) |
| 2026– | Briton Ferry Llansawel | 0 | (0) |
- * Club domestic league appearances and goals as of 11:13, 3 September 2026 (UTC)

Mitchel Bates (born 20 February 2004) is a Welsh footballer who plays as a midfielder for Cymru Premier club Briton Ferry Llansawel.

== Career ==
=== Youth career ===
Bates joined the academy at Swansea City at 11 years old. He later moved to West End and Briton Ferry before rejoining the Swans in 2023. Bates captained the U21 side and led them to finish runners up in the Nathaniel MG Cup. In 2024, he won the U21 Player of the Year.

=== Swansea City ===
Bates never played a match for the senior team. After loan spells in the National League and the Cymru Premier, he was released in July 2026.

==== Truro City loan ====
In January 2025 joined Truro City on loan, which concluded at the end of the season.

==== Briton Ferry Llansawel loan ====
Bates returned to Briton Ferry Llansawel on a loan for the 2025–26 season.

=== Galway United ===
On 31 July 2026, Bates signed an undisclosed-length contract with League of Ireland Premier Division club Galway United on a free transfer.

=== Briton Ferry Llansawel ===
Bates returned to Briton Ferry Llansawel permanently on 1 September 2026.

== Personal life ==
Bates previously held a full-time engineering job.

== Career statistics ==
As of match played 4 May 2026

Appearances and goals by club, season and competition
| Club | Season | League | | | National cup (Note: Includes FAI Cup, Welsh Cup) | | League cup (Note: Includes Welsh League Cup) | | Total | |
| Club | Season | Division | Apps | Goals | Apps | Goals | Apps | Goals | Apps | Goals |
|---|---|---|---|---|---|---|---|---|---|---|
| Swansea City | 2024–25 | Championship | 0 | 0 | 0 | 0 | 0 | 0 | 0 | 0 |
| Truro City (loan) | 2024–25 | National League South | 4 | 0 | ― | | ― | | 4 | 0 |
| Briton Ferry (loan) | 2025–26 | Cymru Premier | 22 | 0 | 1 | 0 | 2 | 0 | 25 | 0 |
| Galway United | 2026 | LOI Premier Division | 0 | 0 | 0 | 0 | ― | | 0 | 0 |
| Career total | | | 26 | 0 | 1 | 0 | 2 | 0 | 29 | 0 |

== Honours ==
Truro City

- National League South: 2024–25
