= 1981–82 League of Ireland =

League of Ireland
- Season: 1981–82
- Champions: Dundalk (6th title)
- Relegated: None
- European Cup: Dundalk F.C.
- Cup Winners' Cup: Limerick United F.C.
- UEFA Cup: Shamrock Rovers F.C.
- Matches played: 240
- Goals scored: 725 (3.02 per match)
- Top goalscorer: Michael O'Connor (23)

Statistics of League of Ireland in the 1981-82 season.

== Overview ==
It was contested by 16 teams, and Dundalk won the championship. This season used a trial point system with 4 for an away win, 3 for a home win, 2 for an away draw, 1 for a home draw.

== Final classification ==
Pos	Team	Pld	W	D	L	GF	GA	GD	Pts	Home/Away Win/Draw
1	Dundalk F.C. (C)	30	20	6	4	61	24	+37	80	AW: 8; HW: 12; AD: 6; HD: 0
2	Shamrock Rovers F.C.	30	21	3	6	50	23	+27	76	AW: 9; HW: 12; AD: 1; HD: 2
3	Bohemian F.C.	30	17	9	4	50	18	+32	72	AW: 8; HW: 9; AD: 4; HD: 5
4	Athlone Town A.F.C.	30	18	3	9	70	42	+28	67	AW: 9; HW: 9; AD: 1; HD: 2
5	Sligo Rovers F.C.	30	16	5	9	55	45	+10	62	AW: 7; HW: 9; AD: 2; HD: 3
6	Limerick United F.C.	30	13	9	8	56	34	+22	58	AW: 5; HW: 8; AD: 5; HD: 4
7	St Patrick's Athletic F.C.	30	14	6	10	49	39	+10	56	AW: 5; HW: 9; AD: 3; HD: 3
8	Waterford F.C. (Note: Waterford changed their name to Waterford United for next season.)	30	12	4	14	39	46	−7	47	AW: 6; HW: 6; AD: 1; HD: 3
9	Shelbourne F.C.	30	10	7	13	44	46	−2	45	AW: 5; HW: 5; AD: 3; HD: 4
10	Cork United F.C. (Note: Cork United went bankrupt and were expelled from the league the end of the season.)	30	10	6	14	41	50	−9	42	AW: 2; HW: 8; AD: 4; HD: 2
11	Drogheda United F.C.	30	8	10	12	45	50	−5	41	AW: 2; HW: 6; AD: 5; HD: 5
12	Home Farm F.C.	30	8	7	15	34	48	−14	40	AW: 5; HW: 3; AD: 4; HD: 3
13	University College Dublin A.F.C.	30	7	10	13	30	41	−11	37	AW: 3; HW: 4; AD: 3; HD: 7
14	Finn Harps F.C.	30	7	4	19	42	61	−19	31	AW: 3; HW: 4; AD: 3; HD: 1
15	Galway United F.C.	30	5	8	17	30	62	−32	29	AW: 2; HW: 3; AD: 4; HD: 4
16	Thurles Town F.C. (Note: Thurles Town resigned from the league at the end of the season.)	30	3	5	22	29	96	−67	18	AW: 2; HW: 1; AD: 2; HD: 3

Source: rsssf.com
Rules for classification: Points system: 4 for an Away win, 3 for a Home win, 2 for an Away draw, 1 for a Home draw.
(C) Champions

== Results ==
Home \ Away	ATH	BOH	CUF	DRO	DUN	FHA	GAL	HOM	LIM	SHM	SHE	SLI	StP	THU	UCD	WAT
Athlone Town	—	1–2	3–1	1–0	1–2	2–0	4–0	1–1	1–2	2–0	3–0	1–3	2–1	8–0	2–2	4–0
Bohemians	1–0	—	0–1	3–0	0–0	3–1	4–1	0–0	0–0	3–1	2–1	1–1	3–0	4–0	1–1	2–0
Cork United	2–3	2–1	—	5–1	0–2	0–1	1–0	5–2	1–0	1–0	1–1	1–3	2–2	2–0	1–0	1–3
Drogheda United	1–4	0–0	3–2	—	1–1	4–0	2–2	3–2	2–2	0–1	1–1	6–1	0–1	6–1	2–0	1–2
Dundalk	7–1	1–4	3–0	5–1	—	3–0	4–0	2–1	1–0	0–1	0–3	1–0	2–0	3–0	2–0	3–1
Finn Harps	2–4	1–3	3–0	1–2	0–2	—	1–2	2–3	0–1	0–2	0–2	1–2	3–2	5–2	3–1	0–0
Galway United	1–4	0–0	1–0	1–1	1–2	3–0	—	0–1	0–3	1–3	1–1	0–0	1–2	3–7	0–2	3–0
Home Farm	0–4	0–1	1–1	3–0	2–3	4–1	3–3	—	0–0	0–2	0–1	1–2	0–4	0–2	1–0	1–2
Limerick United	2–2	0–1	1–0	3–1	2–4	2–2	2–0	0–0	—	2–1	4–3	7–1	2–0	6–0	2–2	1–3
Shamrock Rovers	0–3	2–1	4–1	1–0	1–1	3–1	4–0	1–0	1–1	—	1–0	1–0	2–0	7–0	1–0	2–1
Shelbourne	3–1	0–2	2–0	2–2	0–3	1–1	5–2	3–3	0–3	1–2	—	1–4	0–2	2–2	3–0	2–0
Sligo Rovers	3–0	0–2	3–3	1–1	2–1	5–1	1–0	2–3	1–1	0–1	1–0	—	2–1	2–0	4–1	1–0
St Patrick's Athletic	3–2	0–0	1–3	1–1	0–1	2–1	1–1	2–0	1–0	3–0	2–1	2–3	—	4–1	1–0	3–1
Thurles Town	2–3	1–4	1–1	2–3	0–0	0–7	1–1	0–2	0–3	0–3	1–2	4–3	1–4	—	0–2	0–2
UCD	1–2	1–1	2–0	0–0	1–1	1–1	0–1	1–0	3–2	1–1	1–0	1–3	2–2	2–2	—	0–1
Waterford United	0–1	2–1	3–3	2–0	1–1	1–3	3–1	0–1	3–2	0–1	1–3	2–1	2–2	2–0	1–2	—

Legend: Blue = home team win; Yellow = draw; Red = away team win.

== Top scorers ==
Rank	Player	Club	Goals
1	Michael O'Connor	Athlone Town	22
2	Liam Buckley	Shamrock Rovers	21
3	Gus Gilligan	Sligo Rovers	16
3	Jim Mahon	St Patrick's Athletic	16
5	Brendan Bradley	Sligo Rovers	15
5	Mick Fairclough	Dundalk	15
5	Gary Hulmes	Limerick United	15
8	Terry Daly	Shelbourne	12
8	Brian Duff	Dundalk (4); Galway United (8)	12
10	Alan Campbell	Shamrock Rovers	11
10	Hillary Carlyle	Dundalk	11
10	Denis Clarke	Athlone Town	11
10	Jackie Jameson	Bohemians	11
