= 2026 Galway United F.C. season =

Irish football club season

Galway United
2026 season
- Galway United after a victory against Drogheda United at United Park
- Manager: John Caulfield
- Stadium: Eamonn Deacy Park, Pearse Stadium; Turners Cross
- Premier Division: 8th
- FAI Cup: Semi-finals
- Top goalscorer: League: Kris Twardek (8); All: Stephen Walsh (9)
- Highest home attendance: 4,611; 2–1 v Derry City; 3 April 2026 (Premier Dvision)
- Lowest home attendance: 672; 4–0 v Crumlin United; 17 July 2026 (FAI Cup)
- Average home league attendance: 2,504
- Biggest win: 4–0 v Crumlin United; 17 July 2026 (Home, FAI Cup)
- Biggest defeat: 0–3 v St Patrick's Athletic; 3 July 2026 (Away, Premier Dvision)
Home colours	Away colours	Third colours

The 2026 Galway United F.C. season was the football club's 48th season in the League of Ireland and their third consecutive season in the League of Ireland Premier Division since gaining promotion in 2023.

The club finished the season in 8th, matching their finishing position from the previous season. During the season the club made it to the FAI Cup semi-finals for only the second time in 18 years, where they lost 0–2 to Derry City.

As a result of drainage work at the club's usual home Eamonn Deacy Park during the season, the club played some of their home games at the home of Galway GAA, Pearse Stadium. On 12 June as a result of Pearse Stadium being unavailable the club were forced to play their home game against Dundalk at Turners Cross in Cork.

== Review ==
=== Background ===
The 2025 season, saw Galway United survive on the last day of the season. During the season they went 3 months without a win in the league which led them having to get a draw in the RSC against Waterford in the last game of the season to avoid the relegation play-off on goal difference.

Also during the 2025 season, Galway United's assistant manager Ollie Horgan passed away, after stepping away from the club to deal with his health issues.

Ahead of the season, Jimmy Keohane was named the new club captain, with David Hurley being announced as his vice-captain.

==== First team transfers (winter transfer window) ====
Jon Daly had replaced Ollie Horgan as assistant manager the previous season, however at the start of the 2026 season he was appointed manager of Waterford. Former Cork City and Cobh Ramblers assistant and interim manager, Richie Holland was appointed as John Caulfield's new assistant.

===== Outgoings =====
Only 3 days after the 2025 season ended, goalkeeper Brendan Clarke announced his departure after 3 seasons with the club, he would go on to join Athlone Town. On 14 November 2025, was the departures of Garry Buckley who returned to his native Cork, joining Cobh Ramblers and Malcolm Shaw who returned to his native Canada, joining St. Catharines Roma Wolves.

On 21 November, Jeannot Esua departed the club and would go on to join the club's rivals, Sligo Rovers. The next day, Patrick Hickey departed the club and would go on to join Bohemians.

On 23 November, 4 players all were announced as having departed the club on the same day. Vincent Borden would go on to join Kerry. Regan Donelon would rejoin his hometown club, Dunmore Town in the Roscommon & District League. Bobby Burns signed for newly promoted Premier Division side Dundalk. Finally, Jeremy Sivi joined Serbian side FK Loznica.

Rob Slevin signed for Premier Division side Derry City, having made 100 appearances for Galway in only three years at the club. On 1 January 2026, Steven Healy signed for Treaty United having spent the previous 18 months on loan with the club.

Before the season began Greg Cunningham announced his retirement having finished his career with his hometown club Galway United. He would later be appinted head coach of fellow Galway club, Salthill Devon for their first season in the newly formed FAI National League. There was no announcement of Colm Horgan's departure from the club. However, he did not appear on the squad list at the start of the season and would later be involved with Salthill Devon.

After the season started on 13 February, Cillian Tollett joined First Division side Athlone Town on loan.

===== Incomings =====
On 26 November 2025, the club announced the signing of Wasiri Williams from Latvian club Daugavpils. During December, the club signed both Kris Twardek and Gianfranco Facchineri from the recently dissolved Canadian Premier League club, Valour FC.

On 2 December, the club signed Lee Devitt from Treaty United following a season where he made the PFAI First Division Team of the Year. Two days later the club signed Matty Wolfe from their rivals, Sligo Rovers.

The club re-signed former player Al-Amin Kazeem who had spent 18 months with St Patrick's Athletic, prior to which he spent the first half of the 2024 season on loan with Galway United. They also re-signed Francely Lomboto. The Galway United academy graduate had spent half a season with Sligo Rovers and half a season with NIFL Premiership club Glenavon, before returning to his hometown club.

On 23 January, the club signed Evan Watts on loan from Swansea City for the second season in a row, with him this time being joined by his Swansea teammate Arthur Parker who also signed on loan. On 26 January, the club announced the double signing of Nicolas Fleuriau Chateau from the Vancouver Whitecaps, and Hugo Da Cunha from Portuguese Primeira Liga club Famalicão.

Three days before the first game of the season, the club announced the signing of Connor Barratt on loan from Barnsley. On 23 February, the club signed Haitian internaitonal Frantz Pierrot from Israeli side Bnei Yehuda.

=== February ===

Starting XI (5–3–2 formation) for the opening game against Drogheda United on 6 February 2026

On 6 February 2026, Galway United played their first game of the season at home against Drogheda United. In a game where Galway were mostly dominant David Hurley had a penalty which he sent wide. At the end of the game Drogheda's new signing Jago Godden scored the winner in the 91st minute handing Galway United a 0–1 defeat on the opening day.

Galway United's first away game of the season was set to see them travel to Richmond Park to take on St Patrick's Athletic on 13 February. However, the game was called off following a pitch inspection. Instead their first away game was on 20 February as they travelled to Tolka Park to take on Shelbourne. Gawlay took the lead through Kris Twardek in the 62nd minute, only for Shelbourne to launch the ball up the field and win a penalty just a minute later. The penalty was converted by Harry Wood as the two teams had to settle for a 1–1 draw.

On 27 February, Galway United took on Sligo Rovers at Eamonn Deacy Park in the first Connacht Derby of the season. A solitary Jimmy Keohane goal was enough for Galway to get the 1–0 win, in what was John Caulfield's 100th victory as manager of the club.

=== March ===
On 2 March, the club played their re-fixed foxture against St Patrick's Athletic. During the game Pats dominated the ball. However, United managed to hold them off until the 90th minute, where a Kian Leavy strike from outside the box gave the home side the victory.

Kris Twardek scores a header against Dundalk

On 6 March, Galway faced Dundalk at home. Dundalk took the lead after just 12 minutes through Gbemi Arubi. In the second-half Stephen Walsh would equalise for the home side, before Kris Twardek would score a header to put Galway in the lead on 64 minutes. However, Dundalk would themselves find an equaliser on the 82nd minute from Bobby Burns who had just joined the club from Galway United. The game ended with a 2–2 draw.

On 13 March, the club travelled to Dalymount Park where they would once again be undone by a former player. Killian Brouder was tasked with marking Bohemians' aerial threat Patrick Hickey and had managed to keep him quiet during the game. However, near the end of the game Brouder was forced to come off with an injury, after which Hickey broke away during a corner and scored an 87th minute header to win the game for Bohs.

== Squad ==
#	Name	Nationality	Position	Date of birth (age)	Previous Club	Signed	Notes
Goalkeepers
16	Hugo Da Cunha	(Portugal)	GK	September 6, 2001 (aged 25)	(Portugal) Famalicão	2026	
32	Vincent Angelini	(Scotland)	GK	September 12, 2003 (aged 23)	(Norway) Jerv	2026	
Defenders
2	Anthony O'Connor	(Republic of Ireland)	DF	October 25, 1992 (aged 34)	(England) Harrogate Town	2026	
3	Connor Barratt	(Republic of Ireland)	DF	April 5, 2004 (aged 22)	(England) Barnsley	2026	Loan
5	Killian Brouder	(Republic of Ireland)	DF	August 20, 1998 (aged 28)	(Republic of Ireland) Limerick	2019	
12	Gianfranco Facchineri	(Canada)	DF	April 27, 2002 (aged 24)	(Canada) Valour FC	2026	
15	Wasiri Williams	(England)	DF	April 1, 2000 (aged 26)	(Latvia) Daugavpils	2026	
19	Leigh Kavanagh	(Republic of Ireland)	DF	December 27, 2003 (aged 22)	(Republic of Ireland) Bohemians	2026	Loan
28	James Morahan	(Republic of Ireland)	DF		(Republic of Ireland) Salthill Devon	2026	
30	Al-Amin Kazeem	(England)	DF	April 6, 2002 (aged 24)	(Republic of Ireland) St Patrick's Athletic	2026	
Midfielders
4	Jimmy Keohane	(Republic of Ireland)	MF	January 22, 1991 (aged 35)	(England) Rochdale	2024	Captain
6	Axel Piesold	(England)	MF	March 31, 2005 (aged 21)	(England) Luton Town	2025	
8	Aaron Bolger	(Republic of Ireland)	MF	February 2, 2000 (aged 26)	(Republic of Ireland) St Patrick's Athletic	2025	
10	David Hurley	(Republic of Ireland)	MF	October 21, 1998 (aged 28)	(Republic of Ireland) Cobh Ramblers	2021	Vice-captain
11	Kris Twardek	(Canada)	MF	March 8, 1997 (aged 29)	(Canada) Valour FC	2026	
14	Matty Wolfe	(England)	MF	June 12, 2000 (aged 26)	(Republic of Ireland) Sligo Rovers	2026	
17	Junior Thiam	(Republic of Ireland)	MF	October 28, 2006 (aged 20)	(Republic of Ireland) Academy	2025	
20	Lee Devitt	(Republic of Ireland)	MF	June 3, 2000 (aged 26)	(Republic of Ireland) Treaty United	2026	
21	Dylan Connolly	(Republic of Ireland)	MF	May 2, 1995 (aged 31)	(Northern Ireland) Glentoran	2026	
24	Ed McCarthy	(Republic of Ireland)	MF	April 20, 2001 (aged 25)	(Republic of Ireland) Regional United	2022	
Forwards
7	Stephen Walsh	(Republic of Ireland)	FW	August 29, 1990 (aged 36)	(Republic of Ireland) Galway Hibernians	2018	
9	Francely Lomboto	(Republic of Ireland)	FW	July 2, 2000 (aged 26)	(Northern Ireland) Glenavon	2026	
23	Frantz Pierrot	(Haiti)	FW	April 20, 1999 (aged 27)	(Israel) Bnei Yehuda	2026	
27	Dara McGuinness	(Republic of Ireland)	FW	February 12, 2004 (aged 22)	(Republic of Ireland) Finn Harps	2025	
Players who departed before the end of the season (Note: Age shown displays players’ age at the end of the season. For players who departed before the end of the season, age shown is age at time of departure.)
1	Evan Watts	(Wales)	GK	September 23, 2004 (aged 21)	(Wales) Swansea City	2025	Loan
2	Arthur Parker	(England)	DF	May 3, 2006 (aged 20)	(Wales) Swansea City	2026	Loan
22	Conor McCormack	(Republic of Ireland)	MF	May 18, 1990 (aged 36)	(Republic of Ireland) Derry City	2021	
29	Nicolas Fleuriau Chateau	(Canada)	FW	May 21, 2002 (aged 24)	(Canada) Vancouver Whitecaps	2026	
32	Connor Gleeson	(Republic of Ireland)	GK	June 13, 1993 (aged 33)	(Republic of Ireland) Galway Gaelic	2026	
37	Mitchell Bates	(Wales)	MF	February 20, 2004 (aged 22)	(Wales) Swansea City	2026	

=== Transfers ===
==== In ====
Date	Position	Nationality	Name	Last club	Ref.
26 November 2025	DF	(England)	Wasiri Williams	(Latvia) Daugavpils	
1 December 2025	MF	(Canada)	Kris Twardek	(Canada) Valour FC	
2 December 2025	MF	(Republic of Ireland)	Lee Devitt	(Republic of Ireland) Treaty United	
4 December 2025	MF	(England)	Matty Wolfe	(Republic of Ireland) Sligo Rovers	
5 December 2025	DF	(Canada)	Gianfranco Facchineri	(Canada) Valour FC	
6 January 2026	DF	(England)	Al-Amin Kazeem	(Republic of Ireland) St Patrick's Athletic	
7 January 2026	FW	(Republic of Ireland)	Francely Lomboto	(Northern Ireland) Glenavon	
26 January 2026	FW	(Canada)	Nicolas Fleuriau Chateau	(Canada) Vancouver Whitecaps	
26 January 2026	GK	(Portugal)	Hugo Da Cunha	(Portugal) Famalicão	
23 February 2026	FW	(Haiti)	Frantz Pierrot	(Israel) Bnei Yehuda	
1 July 2026	GK	(Republic of Ireland)	Connor Gleeson	(Republic of Ireland) Galway Gaelic	
2 July 2026	MF	(Republic of Ireland)	Dylan Connolly	(Northern Ireland) Glentoran	
31 July 2026	GK	(Scotland)	Vincent Angelini	(Norway) Jerv	
31 July 2026	MF	(Wales)	Mitchell Bates	(Wales) Swansea City	
13 August 2026	DF	(Republic of Ireland)	Anthony O'Connor	(England) Harrogate Town	

==== Out ====
Date	Position	Nationality	Name	To	Ref.
4 November 2025	GK	(Republic of Ireland)	Brendan Clarke	(Republic of Ireland) Athlone Town	
14 November 2025	DF	(Republic of Ireland)	Garry Buckley	(Republic of Ireland) Cobh Ramblers	
14 November 2025	FW	(Trinidad and Tobago)	Malcolm Shaw	(Canada) St. Catharines Roma Wolves	
21 November 2025	DF	(Cameroon)	Jeannot Esua	(Republic of Ireland) Sligo Rovers	
22 November 2025	MF	(United States)	Patrick Hickey	(Republic of Ireland) Bohemians	
23 November 2025	MF	(United States)	Vincent Borden	(Republic of Ireland) Kerry	
23 November 2025	DF	(Republic of Ireland)	Regan Donelon	(Republic of Ireland) Dunmore Town	
23 November 2025	DF	(Northern Ireland)	Bobby Burns	(Republic of Ireland) Dundalk	
23 November 2025	MF	(England)	Jeremy Sivi	(Serbia) FK Loznica	
30 November 2025	DF	(Republic of Ireland)	Rob Slevin	(Republic of Ireland) Derry City	
1 January 2026	MF	(Republic of Ireland)	Steven Healy	(Republic of Ireland) Treaty United	
28 January 2026	DF	(Republic of Ireland)	Greg Cunningham	Retired	
12 July 2026	MF	(Republic of Ireland)	Conor McCormack	Retired	
14 July 2026	FW	(Canada)	Nicolas Fleuriau Chateau	(Canada) Atlético Ottawa	
16 July 2026	DF	(Republic of Ireland)	Billy Regan	(Republic of Ireland) Treaty United	
31 July 2026	GK	(Republic of Ireland)	Connor Gleeson	(Republic of Ireland) Dunmore MacHales	
27 August 2026	FW	(Republic of Ireland)	Cillian Tollett	(Italy) Bologna	
1 September 2026	MF	(Wales)	Mitchell Bates	(Wales) Briton Ferry Llansawel	

==== Loan In ====
Date	Position	Nationality	Name	From	Date until	Ref.
23 January 2026	DF	(England)	Arthur Parker	(Wales) Swansea City	31 June 2026	
23 January 2026	GK	(Wales)	Evan Watts	(Wales) Swansea City	31 June 2026	
3 February 2026	DF	(Republic of Ireland)	Connor Barratt	(England) Barnsley	1 November 2026 (Note: Barratt's loan deal was originally schedueled to end on 31 June, however it was extended to 1 November during the season)	
1 July 2026	DF	(Republic of Ireland)	Leigh Kavanagh	(Republic of Ireland) Bohemians	1 November 2026	

==== Loan Out ====
Date	Position	Nationality	Name	To	Date until	Ref.
13 February 2026	FW	(Republic of Ireland)	Cillian Tollett	(Republic of Ireland) Athlone Town	27 August 2026 (Note: What was supposed to be a season long loan, was cut short due to Tollett's sale to Bologna)	

== Club ==
=== Coaching staff ===
- Manager: John Caulfield
- Assistant Manager: Richie Holland
- Goalkeeping Coach: Gianluca Aimi
- Strength and Conditioning Coach: Sean Murphy
- Performance Coach: Danny Broderick
- Physiotherapist: Richard Grier
- Analyst: Robert Crosbie
- Team Operations: Robbie O'Sullivan
- Opposition Analyst: Mark Herrick

=== Kit ===
Supplier: O'Neills
Sponsor(s): Comer Group Ireland (Front of Jersey)
Cancer Care West (Back of Jersey - Bottom) (Third Jersey)
Visit Loutraki.com (Back of Jersey - Top) (2025 Away Jersey)

Home	Away	Third	2025 Away

==== Kit information ====
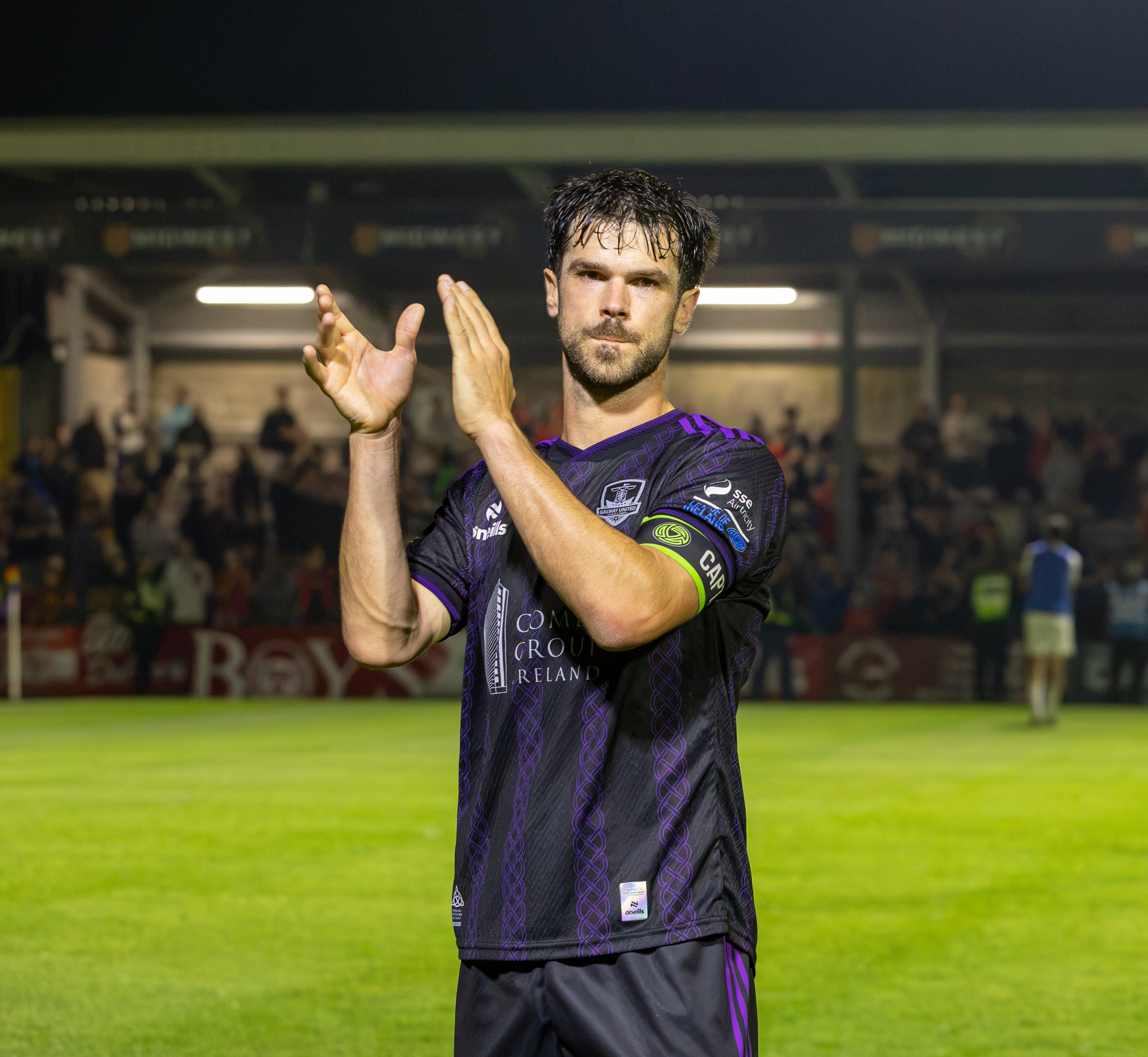
Club captain, Jimmy Keohane wearing the club's third kit.

This is O'Neills' sixth year supplying Galway United's kits, having taken over from Puma at the beginning of the 2021 season.

- Home: The home kit was made in tribute to former Galway United player, Eamonn Deacy. The kit was designed to be reminiscent of the kits Deacy wore during his time at the club. The kit features "AV81" on the back in reference to the year that Deacy won the Football League First Division with Aston Villa.
- Away: The away kit features the same design as the home kit in grayscale (black & white) making reference to how many people during Deacy's playing days would have seen him play vie black & white television screens.
- Third: The third kit was made in tribute to Ollie Horgan. Horgan had passed away from cancer in 2025 having spent the previous 2 and a half years as Galway United Assistant manager. The shirt features the name "Ollie" on the front of the chest and features a hem tag which says "Pssion, Har Work, Integrity". On the back of the shirt is a strip of blue and white, the colours of Salthill Devon whom Horgan had played for in his youth. Also on the back was the cancer charity, Cancer Care West.
- Fourth: For Galway United's away game against St Patrick's Athletic on 2 March, both the home and away kits calshed with Pats' and the third kit had yet to be released. So the team wore the 2025 away kit.

Type	Shirt	Shorts	Socks	Info
Home	Maroon	Maroon	Light Blue	Worn 25 times; against Drogheda United (LOI) (H), Sligo Rovers (LOI) (H), Dundalk (LOI) (H), Waterford (LOI) (H), Shamrock Rovers (LOI) (A), Derry City (LOI) (H), St Patrick's Athletic (LOI) (H), Derry City (LOI) (A), Shamrock Rovers (LOI) (H), Bohemians (LOI) (H), Dundalk (LOI) (H), Derry City (LOI) (H), Shamrock Rovers (LOI) (A), Sligo Rovers (LOI) (H), Crumlin United (FAI) (H), Waterford (LOI) (H), Drogheda United (LOI) (H), Bray Wanderers (FAI) (H), Dundalk (LOI) (A), Bohemians (LOI) (H), Derry City (LOI) (A), Shelbourne (LOI) (H), Derry City (FAI) (H), Shamrock Rovers (LOI) (H), St Patrick's Athletic (LOI) (H)
Away	Grey	Black	Black	Worn 11 times; against Shelbourne (LOI) (A), Bohemians (LOI) (A), Drogheda United (LOI) (A), Waterford (LOI) (A), Sligo Rovers (LOI) (A), Shelbourne (LOI) (A), Bohemians (LOI) (A), Drogheda United (FAI) (A), Sligo Rovers (LOI) (A), Waterford (LOI) (A), Drogheda United (LOI) (A)
Third	Black	Black	Black	Worn 3 times; against Dundalk (LOI) (A), St Patrick's Athletic (LOI) (A), Shelbourne (LOI) (H)
Fourth	Dark Blue	Black	Black	Worn 1 time; against St Patrick's Athletic (LOI) (A)

Key:
LOI=League of Ireland Premier Division
FAI=FAI Cup

== Competitions ==
=== League of Ireland Premier Division ===
==== League Table ====
Pos	Team	Pld	W	D	L	GF	GA	GD	Pts	Qualification or relegation
6	Dundalk	36	11	12	13	55	59	−4	45	
7	Waterford	36	10	13	13	54	61	−7	43	
8	Galway United	36	10	12	14	46	53	−7	42	
9	Drogheda United (R)	36	10	10	16	44	57	−13	40	Qualification for promotion/relegation play-off
10	Sligo Rovers (R)	36	5	10	21	28	66	−38	25	Relegation to League of Ireland First Division

Source: League of Ireland
Rules for classification: 1) Points; 2) Goal difference; 3) Goals scored.
(R) Relegated

==== Results summary ====
Overall								Home						Away					
Pld	W	D	L	GF	GA	GD	Pts	W	D	L	GF	GA	GD	W	D	L	GF	GA	GD
36	10	12	14	46	53	−7	42	6	7	5	25	25	0	4	5	9	21	28	−7

Last updated: 30 October 2026.

==== Results by round ====
Round	1	2	3	4	5	6	7	8	9	10	11	12	13	14	15	16	17	18	19	20	21	22	23	24	25	26	27	28	29	30	31	32	33	34	35	36
Ground	H	A	H	A	H	A	H	A	H	A	A	A	H	A	H	A	H	A	H	H	A	A	H	H	A	H	A	H	H	A	A	H	H	A	H	A
Result	L	D	W	L	D	L	W	L	W	W	L	D	D	D	L	W	L	D	L	W	L	L	W	D	D	D	W	D	L	W	L	D	W	L	D	L
Position	10	8	7	7	7	8	7	8	6	5	6	6	7	7	8	7	7	7	7	7	7	7	7	7	7	7	7	6	7	6	7	7	6	7	6	8

Updated to match(es) played on 30 October 2026. Source: 2026 League of Ireland Premier Division
A = Away; H = Home; W = Win; D = Draw; L = Loss

==== Matches ====
Win Draw Loss

6 February 2026 1	Galway United	0–1	Drogheda United	Terryland, County Galway
19:45 GMT	Williams (yellow card) 19'; Walsh (yellow card) 31'; Hurley (penalty missed) 65'	Report	Kane (yellow card) 10'; Agbaje (yellow card) 38'; Godden 90+1'	Stadium: Eamonn Deacy Park; Attendance: 3,027; Referee: Oliver Moran

20 February 2026 2	Shelbourne	1–1	Galway United	Drumcondra, Dublin 3
19:45 GMT	Ledwidge (yellow card) 17'; Henry-Francis (yellow card) 40'; Wood 64' (pen.); Freitas (yellow card) 90'	Report	Twardek 62'; Williams (yellow card) 63'; Bolger (yellow card) 72'; Hurley (yellow card) 77'	Stadium: Tolka Park; Attendance: 4,052; Referee: Kevin O'Sullivan

27 February 2026 3	Galway United	1–0	Sligo Rovers	Terryland, County Galway
19:45 GMT	Keohane 19'; Bolger (yellow card) 28'	Report	Quirk (yellow card) 28'; Esua (yellow card) 42'; McHugh (red card) 90+6'	Stadium: Eamonn Deacy Park; Attendance: 3,456; Referee: Rob Hennessy

2 March 2026 4	St Patrick's Athletic	1–0	Galway United	Inchicore, Dublin 8
19:45 GMT	Palmer (yellow card) 2'; Baggley (yellow card) 69'; Leavy 90'; Boyce (yellow card) 90+3'	Report	Brouder (yellow card) 6'; Williams (yellow card) 90+5'	Stadium: Richmond Park; Attendance: 3,809; Referee: Aaron O’Dowd
Note: Fixture was originally scheduled for 13 February, but was postponed following a pitch inspection at Richmond Park.

6 March 2026 5	Galway United	2–2	Dundalk	Terryland, County Galway
19:45 GMT	Walsh 52'; Devitt (yellow card) 52'; Twardek 64' (yellow card) 82'; Wolfe (yellow card) 88'	Report	Arubi 12'; O'Keeffe (yellow card) 17'; Burns 82'	Stadium: Eamonn Deacy Park; Attendance: 1,933; Referee: Alan Patchell

13 March 2026 6	Bohemians	1–0	Galway United	Phibsborough, Dublin 7
19:45 GMT	Vaughan (yellow card) 42'; Devoy (yellow card) 45'; Hickey 87'	Report	Bolger (yellow card) 67'	Stadium: Dalymount Park; Attendance: 4,096; Referee: Daniel Murphy

16 March 2026 7	Galway United	4–3	Waterford	Terryland, County Galway
20:00 GMT	Twardek 11', 61'; Hurley 45+3' (pen.) (yellow card) 81'; Pierrot (yellow card) 64' (goal) 90'	Report	Cann (yellow card) 30'; Facchineri 36' (o.g.); Heeney (yellow card) 44'; Amond 38'; Lonergan 90+2' (pen.)	Stadium: Eamonn Deacy Park; Attendance: 1,836; Referee: Kevin O'Sullivan
Note: Live on Virgin Media

20 March 2026 8	Shamrock Rovers	2–0	Galway United	Tallaght, Dublin 24
20:00 GMT	Grant 40'; Healy (yellow card) 76'; Greene 86'	Report	Parker (yellow card) 38'; Facchineri (yellow card) 90'	Stadium: Tallaght Stadium; Attendance: 4,748; Referee: Aaron O'Dowd

3 April 2026 9	Galway United	2–1	Derry City	Terryland, County Galway
20:00 GMT	Hurley 17' (yellow card) 90+5'; Pierrot 81'	Report	Clarke 63'	Stadium: Eamonn Deacy Park; Attendance: 4,611; Referee: Neil Doyle
Note: Live on Virgin Media

6 April 2026 10	Drogheda United	2–3	Galway United	Drogheda, County Louth
17:00 GMT	Doyle 3'; Godden 18'	Report	Kazeem (yellow card) 16'; Lomboto 20'; Twardek 61'; Piesold 68'; Wolfe (yellow card) 73'; Barratt (yellow card) 78'; Walsh (yellow card) 84'; Watts (yellow card) 90'	Stadium: Sullivan and Lambe Park; Attendance: 2,733; Referee: Oliver Moran

17 April 2026 11	Dundalk	2–1	Galway United	Dundalk, County Louth
19:45 GMT	Animasahun (yellow card) 45'; Wilson (yellow card) 56'; McDaid 81', 85'	Report	Wolfe (yellow card) 49'; Walsh 90'	Stadium: Oriel Park; Attendance: 2763; Referee: Daryl Carolan

24 April 2026 12	Waterford	1–1	Galway United	Waterford, County Waterford
19:45 GMT	Houston (yellow card) 18'; McMenamy 90+6'	Report	Brouder 43'; Hurley (yellow card) 83'; Watts (yellow card) 85'	Stadium: RSC; Attendance: 1,826; Referee: Paul Norton

1 May 2026 13	Galway United	2–2	St Patrick's Athletic	Terryland, County Galway
19:45 GMT	Wolfe (yellow card) 4'; Bolger 61', 90+4'	Report	Edmondson 13' (yellow card) 66'; Anang (yellow card) 38'; Lennon (yellow card) 40'; Forrester 54'	Stadium: Eamonn Deacy Park; Attendance: 2,243; Referee: Rob Hennessy

4 May 2026 14	Derry City	1–1	Galway United	Derry, Northern Ireland
17:00 GMT	Cotter (yellow card) 73' dos Santos 90+1'	Report	Clarke 44' (o.g.); Williams (yellow card) 85'; Piesold (yellow card) 87'	Stadium: Celtic Park; Attendance: 4,324; Referee: Alan Patchell
Note: The game was played at Celtic Park, home of Derry GAA as a result of renovations to the Ryan McBride Brandywell Stadium

8 May 2026 15	Galway United	1–3	Shamrock Rovers	Terryland, County Galway
19:45 GMT	Barratt (yellow card) 16'; Wolfe 47'; Keohane (yellow card) 87'	Report	Noonan 2'; Brennan 26'; Sobowale (yellow card) 56' (goal) 73'; Stevens (yellow card) 81'	Stadium: Eamonn Deacy Park; Attendance: 2,641; Referee: Kevin O'Sullivan

16 May 2026 16	Sligo Rovers	1–4	Galway United	Sligo, County Sligo
19:45 GMT	Nolan 17' (pen.); McManus (yellow card) 28'	Report	Williams 5'; Keohane (yellow card) 16' (goal) 29'; Barratt (yellow card) 44'; Devitt (yellow card) 72'; Twardek 73' (yellow card) 73'; Lomboto 74'	Stadium: The Showgrounds; Attendance: 2,677; Referee: Aaron O'Dowd

22 May 2026 17	Galway United	2–4	Bohemians	Terryland, County Galway
19:45 GMT	Walsh (yellow card) 38'; McCarthy 61', 76'; Devitt (yellow card) 64'	Report	Devoy 26'; James-Taylor 30'; Tierney 74'; Hickey 78'	Stadium: Eamonn Deacy Park; Attendance: 2,442; Referee: Lucas Keating

29 May 2026 18	Shelbourne	1–1	Galway United	Drumcondra, Dublin 3
19:45 GMT	Caffrey (yellow card) 17'; Wood 57'; Barrett (yellow card) 75'	Report	Devitt (yellow card) 59'; Pierrot 65'; Facchineri (yellow card) 90+5'	Stadium: Tolka Park; Attendance: 3,924; Referee: Paul McLaughlin

12 June 2026 19	Galway United	0–1	Dundalk	Turners Cross, Cork
19:45 GMT	McCormack (yellow card) 51'; Kazeem (yellow card) 88'	Report	Cornwall (yellow card) 21'; Wilson 90'	Stadium: Turners Cross; Attendance: 454; Referee: Kevin O'Sullivan
Note: Game was originall schedueled to take place in Pearse Stadium, however due to a schedueling conflict with Galway GAA the club was forced to play the game in Turners Cross in Cork

19 June 2026 20	Galway United	2–1	Derry City	Salthill, County Galway
19:45 GMT	Walsh 24', 50'; Hurley (yellow card) 24'; Facchineri (yellow card) 81'	Report	Dummigan (yellow card) 37'; Duffy 89' (pen.)	Stadium: Pearse Stadium; Attendance: 3,101; Referee: Daryl Carolan

26 June 2026 21	Shamrock Rovers	3–1	Galway United	Tallaght, Dublin 24
19:30 GMT	Stevens (yellow card) 24'; Greene 42'; McGovern 45+1'; Noonan 87'	Report	Pierrot 90+4'	Stadium: Tallaght Stadium; Attendance: 3,773; Referee: Arnold Hunter
Note: Game was originally schedueled to kick-off at 20:00 GMT, but was moved due to operational management with concerts at Marlay Park

3 July 2026 22	St Patrick's Athletic	3–0	Galway United	Inchicore, Dublin 8
19:45 GMT	Edmondson 8'; Leavy 17'; Keena 23'	Report	Williams (yellow card) 32'; Walsh (yellow card) 44'; Kavanagh (yellow card) 90'	Stadium: Richmond Park; Attendance: 4,318; Referee: Kevin O'Sullivan

11 July 2026 23	Galway United	3–2	Sligo Rovers	Salthill, County Galway
17:00 GMT	Pierrot 33'; McCarthy (yellow card) 50'; Wolfe 73', 90+3'	Report	Quirk (yellow card) 28' (yellow-red card) 54'; McHugh (yellow card) 67'; Kavanagh 82', 87'; Harkin (yellow card) 90'	Stadium: Pearse Stadium; Attendance: 3,076; Referee: Aaron O'Dowd
Note: Game was originally schedueled for 10 July at 19:45 GMT

25 July 2026 24	Galway United	0–0	Waterford	Salthill, County Galway
17:00 GMT	Pierrot (yellow card) 32'; Facchineri (yellow card) 75'; Walsh (yellow card) 88'	Report	Cann (yellow card) 23'; Mahon (yellow card) 26'; Amond (yellow card) 34'; Johnson (yellow card) 86'; Noonan (yellow card) 90+4'	Stadium: Pearse Stadium; Attendance: 2,015; Referee: Paul Norton
Note: Game was originally schedueled for 24 July at 19:45 GMT

2 August 2026 25	Bohemians	1–1	Galway United	Phibsborough, Dublin 7
19:00 GMT	Whelan 23' (pen.); Todd (yellow card) 49'; Devoy (yellow card) 52'	Report	Williams (yellow card) 22'; Keohane (yellow card) 22'; Bolger 37'; Hurley (yellow card) 52'; Facchineri (yellow card) 71'	Stadium: Dalymount Park; Attendance: 4,019; Referee: Rob Hennessy
Note: Game was originally schedueled for 24 July at 19:45 GMT, but was moved due to Bohemians' participation in the UEFA Conference League

7 August 2026 26	Galway United	0–0	Drogheda United	Terryland, County Galway
19:45 GMT	Hurley (penalty missed) 76'	Report	Agbaje (yellow card) 36'; Farrell (yellow card) 74'; Brennan (yellow card) 90+4'	Stadium: Eamonn Deacy Park; Attendance: 2,533; Referee: Daniel Murphy

21 August 2026 27	Dundalk	1–2	Galway United	Dundalk, County Louth
19:45 GMT	Animasahun (yellow card) 37'; Groome (yellow card) 69'; Buckley (yellow card) 80'; Clarke 85'	Report	McCarthy 9'; Kavanagh (yellow card) 33'; Twardek 55'; Lomboto (yellow card) 82'	Stadium: Oriel Park; Attendance: 3,152; Referee: Mark Houlihan

28 August 2026 28	Galway United	1–1	Shelbourne	Terryland, County Galway
19:45 GMT	Bolger (yellow card) 60'; Twardek (yellow card) 77'; O'Connor (yellow card) 79'; Keohane 90+4'	Report	McInroy (yellow card) 62'; Kelly (penalty missed) 80'; Norris 80' (yellow card) 87'; Odubeko (yellow card) 86'; Moore (yellow card) 90+2'	Stadium: Eamonn Deacy Park; Attendance: 2,239; Referee: Aaron O'Dowd

11 September 2026 29	Galway United	2–3	Bohemians	Terryland, County Galway
19:45 GMT	Facchineri (yellow card) 8'; Walsh 31'; Twardek 53'; Bolger (yellow card) 72'; Hurley (yellow card) 86'	Report	Power (yellow card) 56'; Whelan 75', 89'; Tierney 81'	Stadium: Eamonn Deacy Park; Attendance: 2,419; Referee: Paul McLaughlin

14 September 2026 30	Sligo Rovers	1–3	Galway United	Sligo, County Sligo
19:45 GMT	Kavanagh 8'; McHugh (yellow card) 33'; Pearce (yellow card) 80'; McElroy (yellow card) 86'	Report	Keohane 18' (pen.), 86' (pen.) (yellow card) 84'; Walsh 38'	Stadium: The Showgrounds; Attendance: 1,738; Referee: Rob Harvey
Note: The fixture was originally scheduled for 5 September, and was moved due to both teams participation in the FAI Cup quarter-finals

18 September 2026 31	Derry City	1–0	Galway United	Derry, Northern Ireland
19:45 GMT	McClean (yellow card) 33'; O'Reilly 45+1'	Report	Walsh (yellow card) 30'; Devitt (yellow card) 50'	Stadium: Ryan McBride Brandywell Stadium; Attendance: 2,150; Referee: Mark Houlihan

25 September 2026 32	Galway United	1–1	Shelbourne	Terryland, County Galway
19:45 GMT	Keohane 45+5' (pen.); Bolger (yellow card) 83'; O'Connor (yellow card) 90+2'	Report	Odubeko 59'; Bone (yellow card) 60'; Norris (yellow card) 90+2'	Stadium: Eamonn Deacy Park; Attendance: 2,431; Referee: Rob Hennessy
Note: The fixture was originally scheduled for April 10, and was postponed following a pitch inspection at Eamonn Deacy Park.

16 October 2026 33	Galway United	2–0	Shamrock Rovers	Terryland, County Galway
19:45 GMT	Keohane 2'; Bolger 42'	Report	Healy (yellow card) 16'; McGovern (yellow card) 68'; Sobowale (yellow card) 89'	Stadium: Eamonn Deacy Park; Attendance: 2,534; Referee: Damien McGrath

19 October 2026 34	Waterford	3–2	Galway United	Waterford, County Waterford
19:45 GMT	Amond 19', 45+1'; Mawene (yellow card) 34'; Lonergan 90' (yellow card) 90'	Report	Walsh (yellow card) 32' (goal) 60'; Facchineri (yellow card) 52'; Devitt 53'; Bolger (yellow card) 67'	Stadium: RSC; Attendance: 2,166; Referee: Oliver Moran
Note: The fixture was originally scheduled for 9 October but was moved due to both teams' participation in the FAI Cup semi-finals.

23 October 2026 35	Galway United	0–0	St Patrick's Athletic	Terryland, County Galway
19:45 GMT	Barratt (yellow card) 51'; Devitt (yellow card) 81'; Bolger (yellow card) 88'	Report	Hoare (yellow card) 71'	Stadium: Eamonn Deacy Park; Attendance: 2,077; Referee: Kevin O'Sullivan

30 October 2026 36	Drogheda United	2–0	Galway United	Drogheda, County Louth
19:45 GMT	Kavanagh 32'; Doyle 53'	Report		Stadium: Sullivan and Lambe Park; Attendance: 1,506; Referee: Rob Harvey

=== FAI Cup ===
Win Draw Loss

17 July 2026 Second Round	Galway United	4–0	Crumlin United	Salthill, County Galway
19:45 GMT	Wolfe 11' (pen.), 38'; Lomboto 24'; Walsh 50'; Morahan (yellow card) 87'	Report	Heffenan (yellow card) 23'; Whelan (yellow card) 25'; Dobbin (yellow card) 45+2'	Stadium: Pearse Stadium; Attendance: 672; Referee: Declan Toland

14 August 2026 Third Round	Galway United	1–1 (a.e.t.) (5–3 p)	Bray Wanderers	Terryland, County Galway
19:45 GMT	Hurley (yellow card) 73' (goal) 86'; Barratt (yellow card) 93'	Report	Sesay (yellow card) 16'; Sammy 80'; Duggan (yellow card) 93'	Stadium: Eamonn Deacy Park; Attendance: 1,257; Referee: Paul McLaughlin
	Penalties
	Hurley (penalty scored); Pierrot (penalty scored); Keohane (penalty scored); Devitt (penalty scored); Connolly (penalty scored)		Sammy (penalty scored); Ferizaj (penalty missed); Fagbemi (penalty scored); Oluwabiyi (penalty scored)

4 September 2026 Quarter-Final	Drogheda United	1–2	Galway United	Drogheda, County Louth
19:45 GMT	Kavanagh 15'; Doyle (yellow card) 41' (yellow-red card) 63'	Report	Walsh 23'; Bolger (yellow card) 33'; Devitt 82'	Stadium: Sullivan and Lambe Park; Attendance: 1,674; Referee: Kevin O'Sullivan

10 October 2026 Semi-Final	Galway United	0–2	Derry City	Terryland, County Galway
15:00 GMT	Barratt (yellow card) 25'	Report	Duffy 27', 45+1'; Smith (yellow card) 45+1'; Olayinka (yellow card) 86'; O'Reilly (yellow card)	Stadium: Eamonn Deacy Park; Attendance: 4,512; Referee: Paul Norton
Note: Game was broadcast on RTÉ2

=== Friendlies ===
Win Draw Loss

30 December 2025 Friendly	Mervue United	0–5	Galway United	Ballybane, County Galway
14:30 GMT			Lomboto 19', 24'; Twardek 43'; Tollett (penalty missed) 48' 69', 83'	Stadium: Castlepark; Referee: Marc Lynch

4 January 2026 Friendly	Moyne Villa	1–1	Galway United	Headford, County Galway
12:00 GMT	Moran		Twardek	Stadium: Presentation Grounds

9 January 2026 Friendly	Treaty United	0–2	Galway United	Ennis, County Clare
19:30 GMT				Stadium: Frank Healy Park

18 January 2026 Friendly	Finn Harps	2–3	Galway United	Ballybofey, County Donegal
14:00 GMT	Johnston 30'; McAteer 85'	Report	Tollett 48', 60'; Kazeem 62'	Stadium: Finn Park
Note: This match paid tribute to former Finn Harps manager and Galway United assistant manager Ollie Horgan, who passed away the previous year.

20 January 2026 Friendly	Newport County (Wales)	1–2	Galway United	Newport, Wales
14:00 GMT				Stadium: Dragon Park

22 January 2026 Friendly	Cardiff City U21 (Wales)	0–4	Galway United	Glamorgan, Wales
14:00 GMT				Stadium: The Vale

24 January 2026 Friendly	Sligo Rovers	6–0	Galway United	Westport, County Mayo
14:00 GMT				Stadium: United Park

29 January 2026 Friendly	Cork City	3–1	Galway United	Ballingarry, County Limerick
13:00 GMT	Crowley 80'; Maguire 81' (pen.); Drinan 87'		Lomboto 54'	Stadium: Ballingarry AFC; Referee: Lucas Keating

== Statistics ==
=== Player of the month ===
==== Galway United POTM ====
Awarded monthly to the player that was chosen by members of Galway United Co Op

Month	Player	Ref.
February	(England) Arthur Parker	
March	(Canada) Kris Twardek	
April	(Republic of Ireland) Aaron Bolger	
May	(Republic of Ireland) Ed McCarthy	
June	(Republic of Ireland) Stephen Walsh	
July	(England) Matty Wolfe	
August	(Portugal) Hugo Da Cunha	
September	(Republic of Ireland) Stephen Walsh	
October	(Republic of Ireland) Aaron Bolger	

=== Appearances and goals ===
This table shows all of the players who have featured in a first team squad for Galway United this season
Brackets denotes appearances made as a substitute

No.	Pos.	Player	League		FAI Cup		Total	
No.	Pos.	Player	Apps	Goals	Apps	Goals	Apps	Goals
1	GK	(Wales) Evan Watts	21	0	0	0	21	0
2	DF	(England) Arthur Parker	12(1)	0	0	0	12	0
2	DF	(Republic of Ireland) Anthony O'Connor	10	0	3	0	13	0
3	DF	(Republic of Ireland) Connor Barratt	27(4)	0	4(1)	0	31	0
4	MF	(Republic of Ireland) Jimmy Keohane	32(1)	7	4	0	36	7
5	DF	(Republic of Ireland) Killian Brouder	22	1	1	0	23	1
6	MF	(England) Axel Piesold	14(13)	1	1	0	15	1
7	FW	(Republic of Ireland) Stephen Walsh	35(4)	7	4	2	39	9
8	MF	(Republic of Ireland) Aaron Bolger	34(2)	4	4(1)	0	38	4
9	FW	(Republic of Ireland) Francely Lomboto	26(20)	2	4(2)	1	30	3
10	MF	(Republic of Ireland) David Hurley	36(2)	2	2	1	39	3
11	MF	(Canada) Kris Twardek	29(11)	8	4(1)	0	33	8
12	DF	(Canada) Gianfranco Facchineri	32	0	3(1)	0	35	0
14	MF	(England) Matty Wolfe	25(17)	3	2(1)	2	27	5
15	DF	(England) Wasiri Williams	30(11)	1	3(1)	0	33	1
16	GK	(Portugal) Hugo Da Cunha	14	0	4	0	18	0
17	MF	(Republic of Ireland) Junior Thiam	7(6)	0	2(2)	0	9	0
19	DF	(Republic of Ireland) Leigh Kavanagh	6(2)	0	3	0	9	0
20	MF	(Republic of Ireland) Lee Devitt	35(9)	1	4(1)	1	39	2
21	MF	(Republic of Ireland) Dylan Connolly	10(9)	0	3(2)	0	13	0
22	MF	(Republic of Ireland) Conor McCormack	13(6)	0	0	0	13	0
23	FW	(Haiti) Frantz Pierrot	29(19)	5	2(2)	0	31	5
24	MF	(Republic of Ireland) Ed McCarthy	31(5)	3	2(1)	0	33	3
27	FW	(Republic of Ireland) Dara McGuinness (Note: McGuinness missed the entire season with an injury he picked up in October 2025)	0	0	0	0	0	0
28	DF	(Republic of Ireland) James Morahan	2(2)	0	1(1)	0	3	0
29	FW	(Canada) Nicolas Fleuriau Chateau	3(3)	0	0	0	3	0
30	DF	(England) Al-Amin Kazeem	16(8)	0	2(1)	0	18	0
32	GK	(Republic of Ireland) Connor Gleeson	0	0	0	0	0	0
32	GK	(Scotland) Vincent Angelini	1	0	0	0	1	0
35	GK	(Republic of Ireland) Eoin Doyle	0	0	0	0	0	0
37	MF	(Wales) Mitchell Bates	0	0	0	0	0	0
54	MF	(Republic of Ireland) Connor Whittaker	1(1)	0	1(1)	0	2	0

=== Clean sheets ===
No.	Player	League	FAI Cup	Total		
No.	Player	1	(Wales) Evan Watts	1	0	1
16	(Portugal) Hugo Da Cunha	4	1	5		
32	(Scotland) Vincent Angelini	0	0	0		

=== Disciplinary record ===
No.	Player	League			FAI Cup			Total		
No.	Player	Yellow card	(yellow card) (yellow-red card)	Red card	Yellow card	(yellow card) (yellow-red card)	Red card	Yellow card	(yellow card) (yellow-red card)	Red card
8	Aaron Bolger	8	0	0	1	0	0	9	0	0
10	David Hurley	7	0	0	1	0	0	8	0	0
12	Gianfranco Facchineri	8	0	0	0	0	0	8	0	0
7	Stephen Walsh	7	0	0	0	0	0	7	0	0
3	Connor Barratt	4	0	0	2	0	0	6	0	0
15	Wasiri Williams	6	0	0	0	0	0	6	0	0
20	Lee Devitt	6	0	0	0	0	0	6	0	0
4	Jimmy Keohane	4	0	0	0	0	0	4	0	0
14	Matty Wolfe	4	0	0	0	0	0	4	0	0
11	Kris Twardek	3	0	0	0	0	0	3	0	0
1	Evan Watts	2	0	0	0	0	0	2	0	0
2	Anthony O'Connor	2	0	0	0	0	0	2	0	0
19	Leigh Kavanagh	2	0	0	0	0	0	2	0	0
22	Conor McCormack	2	0	0	0	0	0	2	0	0
23	Frantz Pierrot	2	0	0	0	0	0	2	0	0
30	Al-Amin Kazeem	2	0	0	0	0	0	2	0	0
2	Arthur Parker	1	0	0	0	0	0	1	0	0
5	Killian Brouder	1	0	0	0	0	0	1	0	0
6	Axel Piesold	1	0	0	0	0	0	1	0	0
9	Francely Lomboto	1	0	0	0	0	0	1	0	0
24	Ed McCarthy	1	0	0	0	0	0	1	0	0
28	James Morahan	0	0	0	1	0	0	1	0	0
Totals		74	0	0	5	0	0	79	0	0

== International call-ups ==
=== Wales Under 21 National Team ===
Player	Fixture	Date	Location	Event
Evan Watts	vs. Denmark	31 March 2026	Vejle Stadium, Vejle	2027 UEFA European U21 Championship qualification
