= Arthur Parker (footballer, born 2006) =

English footballer (born 2006)

Personal information
- Date of birth: 3 May 2006 (age 20)
- Place of birth: England
- Height: 1.86 m (6 ft 1 in)
- Positions: Centre back; right back

Team information
- Current team: Swansea City
- Number: 46

Youth career
- 2013–2022: Fulham
- 2022–: Swansea City

Senior career*
Years	Team	Apps	(Gls)
2025–	Swansea City	0	(0)
2026	→ Galway United (loan)	12	(0)
- * Club domestic league appearances and goals as of 10:09, 1 July 2026 (UTC)

Arthur Parker (born 3 May 2006) is an English professional footballer who plays as a defender for EFL Championship club Swansea City.

== Youth career ==
Parker joined Fulham at under-eight level and would spend 9 years at the club. In August 2022 Parker joined Swansea City under 23's after a successful trial.

== Career ==
On 12 August 2025 Parker made his senior debut for Swansea City coming on as a substitute against Crawley Town in the EFL Cup.

On 23 January 2026 Parker joined League of Ireland Premier Division club Galway United on loan for the first half of their 2026 season along with Swansea teammate Evan Watts. In his first month at the club he won the club’s player of the month. He made 12 appearances during his loan spell before returning to Swansea at the start of July 2026.

== Career statistics ==
As of match played 26 June 2026

Appearances and goals by club, season and competition
Club	Season	League			National cup (Note: Includes FA Cup, FAI Cup)		League cup (Note: Includes EFL Cup)		Other		Total	
Club	Season	Division	Apps	Goals	Apps	Goals	Apps	Goals	Apps	Goals	Apps	Goals
Swansea City	2025–26	Championship	0	0	0	0	1	0	—		1	0
Galway United (loan)	2026	LOI Premier Division	12	0	0	0	—		—		12	0
Career total			12	0	0	0	1	0	0	0	13	0
