= Evan Watts =

Welsh professional footballer

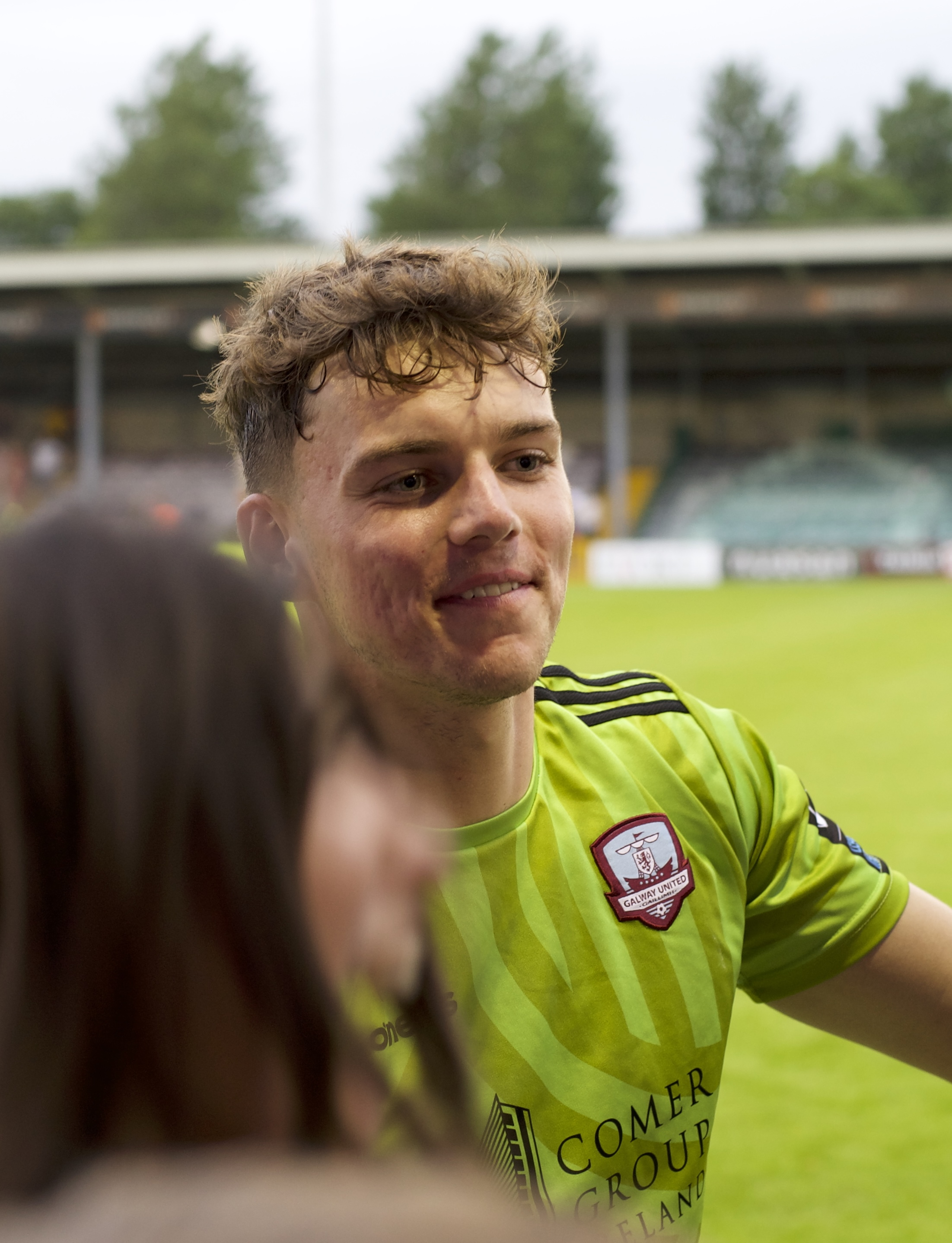

Personal information
- Full name: Evan Thomas Watts
- Date of birth: 23 September 2004 (age 22)
- Place of birth: Haverfordwest, Wales
- Height: 1.82 m (6 ft 0 in)
- Position: Goalkeeper

Team information
- Current team: Swansea City

Youth career
- 2016–: Swansea City

Senior career*
Years	Team	Apps	(Gls)
2025–	Swansea City	0	(0)
2025	→ Galway United (loan)	16	(0)
2026	→ Galway United (loan)	21	(0)

International career^{‡}
2018	Wales U16	3	(0)
2019	Wales U15	1	(0)
2024–2026	Wales U21	8	(0)
- * Club domestic league appearances and goals as of 18:13, 26 October 2026 (UTC) ‡ National team caps and goals as of 18:13, 26 October 2026 (UTC)

Evan Thomas Watts (born 23 September 2004) is a Welsh professional footballer who plays as a goalkeeper for EFL Championship club Swansea City. He is a Wales Under-21 International.

== Early life ==
Prior to joining Swansea City, Watts participated in tennis, cricket, rugby, swimming and cross country running. He continued to play cricket after joining Swansea City.

== Club career ==
Watts joined Swansea City at Under-12 level, signing his first professional contract with Swansea in July 2023. Watts signed a new 1 and a half year contract with the option for a further 1 year, with Swansea City in December 2024.

Swansea were one of two Welsh clubs who play in England, to be invited as a wildcard team to participate in the 2023–24 Welsh League Cup campaign. Watts was not involved in the final, as Swansea City U21s came up runners up, in a 5–1 loss to TNS.

=== Galway United (loans) ===
On 10 January 2025, Watts joined League of Ireland Premier Division club Galway United on an initial season-long loan deal, which saw him become Galway's first ever Welsh player. He made his senior professional debut in Galway's 1–1 draw with Derry City.

Watts was named Galway United's player of the month for June.

On 22 October 2025 Watts announced via social media that his loan spell had been cut-short with just 3 games remaining in Galway United's season. Watts finished the season with 5 clean sheets from 18 games in all competitions. He also ended the season with 2 assists which was the most out of any goalkeeper in the League of Ireland that season.

On 23 January 2026 it was announced that Watts would be returning to Galway United loan until 30 June 2026 ahead of the 2026 season, along with Swansea teammate Arthur Parker. He made 21 appearances during his second loan spell with the club.

== International career ==
On 22 March 2023, Watts made his Wales Under-21 debut in a 2–1 win against Lithuania.

== Career statistics ==
As of match played on 26 June 2026

Club	Season	League			National Cup (Note: Includes FA Cup & FAI Cup)		League Cup (Note: Includes EFL Cup)		Other		Total	
Club	Season	Division	Apps	Goals	Apps	Goals	Apps	Goals	Apps	Goals	Apps	Goals
Swansea City	2023–24	EFL Championship	0	0	0	0	0	0	3 (Note: Appearances in the Welsh League Cup)	0	3	0
Swansea City	2024–25	EFL Championship	0	0	–		0	0	–		0	0
Swansea City	2025–26	EFL Championship	0	0	0	0	0	0	–		0	0
Swansea City	2026–27	EFL Championship	0	0	0	0	0	0	–		0	0
Swansea City	Total		0	0	0	0	0	0	3	0	3	0
Galway United (loan)	2025	LOI Premier Division	16	0	2	0	–		–		18	0
Galway United (loan)	2026	LOI Premier Division	21	0	–		–		–		21	0
Career total			37	0	2	0	0	0	3	0	42	0
