= Jago Godden =

New Zealand football player

Personal information
- Date of birth: 17 January 2004 (age 22)
- Height: 6 ft 4 in (1.93 m)
- Position: Midfielder

Team information
- Current team: Walsall

Youth career
- Wellington Phoenix

Senior career*
Years	Team	Apps	(Gls)
2022–2026	Christchurch United	57	(10)
2026	Bedford Town	11	(4)
2026–	Walsall	0	(0)
2026	→ Drogheda United (loan)	31	(2)
- * Club domestic league appearances and goals as of 17:52, 10 November 2026 (UTC)

Jago Godden is a New Zealand-born footballer who plays as a midfielder for EFL League Two side Walsall.

== Club career ==
A product of the Wellington Phoenix academy, Godden made 24 appearances for New Zealand top flight side Christchurch United aged just 16. He also spent time with the academies of Wolverhampton Wanderers, Coventry City, Bolton Wanderers and Everton.

In four seasons with the club, Godden played fifty-seven games and scored ten goals, including thirteen appearances in New Zealand's top flight and three Chatham Cup appearances.

In November 2025, Godden left Christchurch and New Zealand to sign for English side Bedford Town.

On 4 February 2026, Godden was signed by Walsall on an 18-month contract. He was immediately loaned to Drogheda United until January 2027. On 6 February 2026, he came off the bench to score an injury time winner in a 1–0 victory away to Galway United at Eamonn Deacy Park in the opening game of the season. He scored 2 goals in 34 appearances in all competitions in 2026, as Drogheda were relegated following a 2–1 defeat to UCD in the Promotion/Relegation Playoff.

== International career ==
Godden was called up to the New Zealand Under-17 team in September 2020, ahead of the OFC Under-17s Championship the following year.
