= Aaron Bolger =

Irish footballer

Personal information
- Full name: Aaron Nigel Bolger
- Date of birth: 2 February 2000 (age 26)
- Place of birth: Avoca, County Wicklow, Ireland
- Height: 1.70 m (5 ft 7 in)
- Position: Midfielder

Team information
- Current team: Galway United
- Number: 8

Youth career
- –2016: St Joseph's Boys
- 2016–2018: Shamrock Rovers

Senior career*
| Years | Team | Apps | (Gls) |
| 2016–2019 | Shamrock Rovers | 24 | (1) |
| 2019 | → Cardiff City (loan) | 0 | (0) |
| 2019–2021 | Cardiff City | 0 | (0) |
| 2020 | → Shamrock Rovers (loan) | 0 | (0) |
| 2020 | → Shamrock Rovers II (loan) | 11 | (0) |
| 2021 | → Longford Town (loan) | 10 | (0) |
| 2021–2023 | Cork City | 72 | (2) |
| 2024–2025 | St Patrick's Athletic | 17 | (0) |
| 2025 | → Ebbsfleet United (loan) | 16 | (0) |
| 2025– | Galway United | 48 | (4) |

International career^{‡}
| 2016 | Republic of Ireland U16 | 2 | (0) |
| 2016–2017 | Republic of Ireland U17 | 9 | (0) |
| 2017 | Republic of Ireland U18 | 2 | (0) |
| 2017–2019 | Republic of Ireland U19 | 10 | (0) |
- * Club domestic league appearances and goals as of 18:48, 10 November 2026 (UTC) ‡ National team caps and goals as of 19:15, 13 December 2023 (UTC)

Aaron Nigel Bolger (born 2 February 2000) is an Irish professional footballer who plays as a midfielder for League of Ireland Premier Division club Galway United. His previous clubs are Shamrock Rovers, Cardiff City, Longford Town, Cork City, St Patrick's Athletic & Ebbsfleet United.

== Career ==
=== Youth career ===
A native of Avoca, County Wicklow, Bolger came through St Joseph's Boys, before moving to the academy of League of Ireland club Shamrock Rovers in 2016. While at St Joseph's Boys, he was part of a formidable side that included fellow future professional footballers Joe Redmond, Brandon Kavanagh, Jonathan Afolabi, Andy Lyons, Promise Omochere, Ryan Burke and Max Murphy among others.

=== Shamrock Rovers ===
Bolger made his senior debut for Shamrock Rovers on 9 September 2016, when he replaced Stephen McPhail from the bench in a 5–0 defeat to Cork City an FAI Cup tie at Tallaght Stadium. His league debut came on 25 September 2016, in an 4–2 win over Galway United. Bolger's first goal in senior football was on 23 June 2017 when he scored in the 91st minute of a 4–1 win at home to Drogheda United. He made his first appearance in European football on 6 July 2017, when he came off the bench in a 1–0 win at home to Stjarnan of Iceland in a UEFA Europa League tie. On 16 September 2017, he started in the 2017 League of Ireland Cup Final, but was sent off in the 64th minute for a second yellow as his challenge was late and high on Dundalk defender Niclas Vemmelund as his side lost 3–0. He featured 18 times in all competitions over the 2018 season, with his performances drawing interest from EFL Championship side Preston North End.

==== Cardiff City loan ====
On 4 February 2019, it was announced that Bolger had signed for Premier League club Cardiff City on loan until the end of their season.

=== Cardiff City ===
After impressing with the club's Under 23 side during his loan spell, he signed a permanent contract with the club on 2 July 2019. On 1 June 2021, following two loan spells back in Ireland, Bolger was announced as being released by the club following the end of his contract, after failing to make a first team appearance during his 2 1/2 years with the club.

==== Shamrock Rovers loan ====
On 1 August 2020, Bolger was loaned back to Shamrock Rovers until the end of their season in December. He made the first team squad just once, remaining an unused substitute, while all 11 of his appearances were with the club's reserve side Shamrock Rovers II in the League of Ireland First Division.

==== Longford Town loan ====
On 30 January 2021, Bolger was loaned to newly promoted League of Ireland Premier Division side Longford Town until the end of June 2021, when his contract at Cardiff City expired. He made 10 appearances for the club during his loan spell.

=== Cork City ===
Following the end of his Cardiff City contract, Bolger was released, signing for League of Ireland First Division leaders Cork City as a free agent on 29 July 2021. He made 10 appearances in the second half of his side's campaign as they missed out on the playoffs. On 3 November 2021, Bolger signed a new contract with the club for the 2022 season. He featured 34 times in all competitions over the season, scoring twice as they won the 2022 League of Ireland First Division. He signed a new contract with the club on 5 December 2022 ahead of their 2023 League of Ireland Premier Division campaign. On 6 March 2023 during a 4–4 draw away to Shamrock Rovers, he was involved in a head collision with Trevor Clarke that knocked Bolger unconscious and knocked his teeth out, requiring three Root canal treatments to resolve the issue. On 10 November 2023, he featured in the 2023 League of Ireland Premier Division Play-off as his side lost 2–1 to Waterford at Tallaght Stadium, resulting in relegation back to the League of Ireland First Division.

=== St Patrick's Athletic ===
On 13 December 2023, it was announced that Bolger had signed a multi-year contract with St Patrick's Athletic. He made his debut for the club on 22 January in a Leinster Senior Cup game away to Usher Celtic. On 25 July 2024, he featured in his side's 3–1 win over Vaduz of Liechtenstein in the UEFA Conference League, replacing Romal Palmer from the bench in the 76th minute. On 8 October 2024, Bolger was part of the Pats side that defeated St Mochta's 2–1 in the final of the 2023–24 Leinster Senior Cup. In February 2025, he was sent out on a 6-month loan before permanently departing the club by mutual consent on 3 July 2025.

==== Ebbsfleet United loan ====
On 4 February 2025, it was announced that Bolger had signed for bottom of the table National League club Ebbsfleet United on loan until the end of their season in the summer. He made his debut for the club on 8 February 2025 in a 0–0 draw away to Rochdale at Spotland Stadium. He made 16 appearances for the club as they finished bottom of the table and were relegated to the National League South a month before the end of the season.

=== Galway United ===
It was announced on 3 July 2025 that Bolger had signed for Galway United. He made a total of 17 appearances in all competitions by the end of his first 6 months with the club, helping them to retain their Premier Division status on the final day of the season.

== Style of play ==
Bolger is a defensive midfielder and has been described by his former manager Stephen Bradley as being "a nasty little f****r!" who can "do a bit of everything. He can tackle, he can play, he just needs to add goals to his game and he would be very close to a complete midfielder. He just doesn't care, Aaron. He doesn't see the players he's playing against, he doesn't see any of their players and think 'oh'. And that sort of don't care attitude will drive his career. Every level he goes up, he'll respond to it." Former teammate Ronan Finn speaking about Bolger when he was 17 years old, said "Paul Scholes was a small midfielder and Aaron has a low centre of gravity. He manipulates his body really well to protect the ball. But Aaron is a central midfielder and I honestly don't know where he has learned the game. His knowledge of the game is so good."

== International career ==
Bolger has been capped for the Republic of Ireland at U16, U17, U18 and U19 level. He was named as part of the squad for the Republic of Ireland U17 team's 2017 UEFA European Under-17 Championship in Croatia.

On 18 March 2018, he was named FAI Under-17 International Player of the Year for 2017.

== Career statistics ==
As of match played on 30 October 2026

Appearances and goals by club, season and competition
| Club | Season | League | | | National Cup (Note: Includes FAI Cup & FA Cup) | | League Cup (Note: Includes League of Ireland Cup & EFL Cup) | | Europe | | Other | | Total | |
| Club | Season | Division | Apps | Goals | Apps | Goals | Apps | Goals | Apps | Goals | Apps | Goals | Apps | Goals |
|---|---|---|---|---|---|---|---|---|---|---|---|---|---|---|
| Shamrock Rovers | 2016 | LOI Premier Division | 3 | 0 | 1 | 0 | 0 | 0 | 0 (Note: Appearance(s) in the UEFA Europa League) | 0 | 0 (Note: Appearance(s) in the Leinster Senior Cup) | 0 | 4 | 0 |
| Shamrock Rovers | 2017 | LOI Premier Division | 7 | 1 | 4 | 0 | 1 | 0 | 1 | 0 | 1 | 0 | 14 | 1 |
| Shamrock Rovers | 2018 | LOI Premier Division | 14 | 0 | 0 | 0 | 1 | 0 | 2 | 0 | 1 | 0 | 18 | 0 |
| Shamrock Rovers | 2019 | LOI Premier Division | 0 | 0 | — | | — | | — | | — | | 0 | 0 |
| Shamrock Rovers | Total | | 24 | 1 | 5 | 0 | 2 | 0 | 3 | 0 | 2 | 0 | 36 | 1 |
| Cardiff City (loan) | 2018–19 | Premier League | 0 | 0 | — | | — | | — | | — | | 0 | 0 |
| Cardiff City | 2019–20 | EFL Championship | 0 | 0 | 0 | 0 | 0 | 0 | — | | — | | 0 | 0 |
| Cardiff City | 2020–21 | EFL Championship | 0 | 0 | 0 | 0 | 0 | 0 | — | | — | | 0 | 0 |
| Cardiff City | Total | | 0 | 0 | 0 | 0 | 0 | 0 | – | | — | | 0 | 0 |
| Shamrock Rovers (loan) | 2020 | LOI Premier Division | 0 | 0 | 0 | 0 | — | | — | | — | | 0 | 0 |
| Shamrock Rovers II (loan) | 2020 | LOI First Division | 11 | 0 | — | | — | | — | | — | | 11 | 0 |
| Longford Town (loan) | 2021 | LOI Premier Division | 10 | 0 | — | | — | | — | | — | | 10 | 0 |
| Cork City | 2021 | LOI First Division | 10 | 0 | 0 | 0 | — | | — | | — | | 10 | 0 |
| Cork City | 2022 | LOI First Division | 31 | 2 | 2 | 0 | — | | — | | 0 (Note: Appearance in the Munster Senior Cup) | 0 | 33 | 2 |
| Cork City | 2023 | LOI Premier Division | 31 | 0 | 4 | 0 | — | | — | | 1 (Note: Appearance in the 2023 League of Ireland Promotion/Relegation Division Play-off) | 0 | 36 | 0 |
| Cork City | Total | | 72 | 2 | 6 | 0 | — | | — | | 1 | 0 | 79 | 2 |
| St Patrick's Athletic | 2024 | LOI Premier Division | 17 | 0 | 0 | 0 | — | | 6 (Note: Apprarance(s) in the UEFA Conference League) | 0 | 6 (Note: 5 appearances in the Leinster Senior Cup & 1 appearance in the President of Ireland's Cup) | 0 | 29 | 0 |
| St Patrick's Athletic | 2025 | LOI Premier Division | — | | — | | — | | — | | 0 | 0 | 0 | 0 |
| St Patrick's Athletic | Total | | 17 | 0 | 0 | 0 | — | | 6 | 0 | 6 | 0 | 29 | 0 |
| Ebbsfleet United (loan) | 2024–25 | National League | 16 | 0 | — | | — | | — | | — | | 16 | 0 |
| Galway United | 2025 | LOI Premier Division | 14 | 0 | 3 | 0 | — | | — | | — | | 17 | 0 |
| Galway United | 2026 | LOI Premier Division | 34 | 4 | 4 | 0 | — | | — | | — | | 38 | 4 |
| Galway United | Total | | 48 | 4 | 7 | 0 | – | | – | | – | | 55 | 4 |
| Total | | | 185 | 6 | 17 | 0 | 2 | 0 | 9 | 0 | 10 | 0 | 223 | 6 |

== Honours ==
=== Club ===
Cork City

- League of Ireland First Division (1): 2022

=== Individual ===
- PFAI First Division Team of the Year (1): 2022
- FAI Under-17 International Player of the Year (1): 2017
