= Vincent Angelini =

Scottish footballer (born 2003)

Personal information
- Full name: Vincent Angelini
- Date of birth: 12 September 2003 (age 23)
- Place of birth: Glasgow, Scotland
- Height: 1.89 m (6 ft 2 in)
- Position: Goalkeeper

Team information
- Current team: Galway United
- Number: 32

Youth career
- St Cadoc's
- –2021: Celtic
- 2021–2023: Watford
- 2023–2024: Brentford

Senior career*
Years	Team	Apps	(Gls)
2024–2025	Al-Riyadh	0	(0)
2025–2026	Jerv	6	(0)
2026	Jerv 2	2	(0)
2026–	Galway United	1	(0)
- * Club domestic league appearances and goals as of 17:33, 8 November 2026 (UTC)

Vincent Angelini (born 12 September 2003) is a Scottish professional footballer who plays as a goalkeeper for League of Ireland Premier Division club Galway United.

Angelini is a Celtic Academy product and began his professional career with the club. After spells with Watford U23 and Brentford B, Angelini's senior career began with Saudi Arabian club Al-Riyadh in 2024. After a non-playing spell, he transferred to Norwegian lower league club Jerv in 2025.

== Club career ==
=== Celtic and Watford ===
Beginning his career as a midfielder or right back, Angelini played for and coached at St Cadoc's during his youth career. He joined the Celtic Academy at age eight and was converted into a goalkeeper. Angelini progressed to sign a two-year professional contract at the age of 16 in August 2019. After 11 years with the club, Angelini left Celtic when his contract expired at the end of the 2020–21 season.

In July 2021, Angelini moved to England to join the Watford U23 team. He signed a two-year contract, with the option of a further year. While assuming a "leadership role" with the U23 team and captaining the team on occasion, Angelini trained with the first team group and was an unused substitute during three 2021–22 Premier League matches. He departed the club in January 2023.

=== Brentford ===
On 30 January 2023, Angelini signed an 18-month contract with the B team at Premier League club Brentford, with the option of a further year, following a successful trial. In December 2023, Angelini was an unused substitute during two Premier League matches. He was released when the club declined to take up the option on his contract at the end of the 2023–24 season.

=== Al-Riyadh ===
Following a successful trial spell, Angelini signed a two-year contract with Saudi Pro League club Al-Riyadh on 3 September 2024. He served as third choice behind Milan Borjan and Abdulrahman Al-Shammari during the 2024–25 season and was an unused substitute during three matches. He departed the club during the 2025 off-season.

=== Jerv ===
After trialling with Waldhof Mannheim and USL Dunkerque during the 2025 off-season, Angelini signed a contract with Norwegian Second Division club Jerv on a free transfer on 11 September 2025. He made six appearances during the remainder of the 2025 season, in which the club fell short of the playoff place. Angelini signed a new 18-month contract in November 2025. Angelini was an unused substitute on 12 occasions during the first half of the 2026 season and had his contract terminated by mutual consent on 4 July 2026.

=== Galway United ===
On 31 July 2026, Angelini signed an undisclosed-length contract with League of Ireland Premier Division club Galway United on a free transfer. He made one appearance, in the club's final match of the 2026 season. Angelini was retained for the 2027 season.

== International career ==
Angelini was an unused substitute for the Scotland U21 team on four occasions during the 2023–24 season.

== Personal life ==
Angelini is the grandson of former Celtic footballer and manager David Hay and his father Tommaso was a youth footballer with Lazio. He holds British and Italian citizenship. He attended St Ninian's High School.

== Career statistics ==
As of match played 30 October 2026

Appearances and goals by club, season and competition
Club	Season	League			National cup (Note: Includes FA Cup, King Cup, FAI Cup)		League cup (Note: Includes EFL Cup)		Total	
Club	Season	Division	Apps	Goals	Apps	Goals	Apps	Goals	Apps	Goals
Watford	2021–22	Premier League	0	0	0	0	0	0	0	0
Brentford	2023–24	Premier League	0	0	0	0	0	0	0	0
Al-Riyadh	2024–25	Saudi Pro League	0	0	0	0	―		0	0
Jerv	2025	Norwegian Second Division Group 1	6	0	―		―		6	0
Jerv	2026	Norwegian Second Division Group 1	0	0	―		―		0	0
Jerv	Total		6	0	―		―		6	0
Jerv II	2026	Norwegian Fourth Division Agder	2	0	―		―		2	0
Galway United	2026	League of Ireland Premier Division	1	0	0	0	―		1	0
Career total			9	0	0	0	0	0	9	0
