= Jimmy Keohane =

Irish footballer

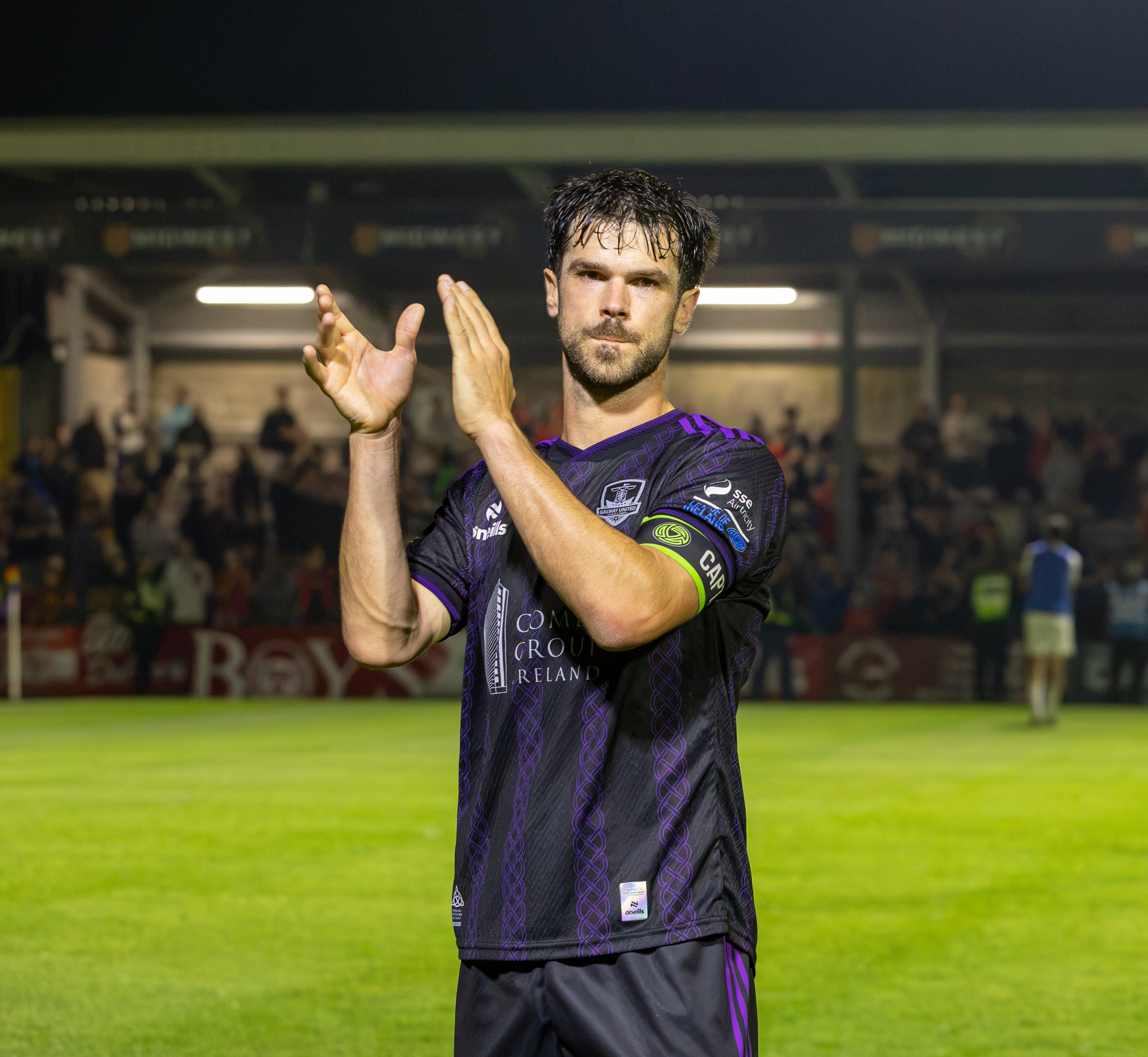
- Keohane with Galway United in August 2026

Personal information
- Full name: James Clifford John Keohane
- Date of birth: 22 January 1991 (age 35)
- Place of birth: Aylesbury, Buckinghamshire, England
- Position: Midfielder

Team information
- Current team: Galway United
- Number: 4

Youth career
- 2000–2006: Belvedere
- 2006–2008: Evergreen

Senior career*
Years	Team	Apps	(Gls)
2009–2010	Wexford Youths	34	(6)
2010–2011	Bristol City	0	(0)
2010	→ Clevedon Town (loan)	5	(1)
2011–2015	Exeter City	81	(9)
2015–2016	Woking	15	(2)
2016	Sligo Rovers	31	(2)
2017–2018	Cork City	62	(10)
2019–2024	Rochdale	186	(22)
2024–	Galway United	70	(10)

International career
2009–2010	Republic of Ireland U19	5	(1)
- * Club domestic league appearances and goals as of 31 October 2026

James Clifford John Keohane (born 22 January 1991) is an Irish professional footballer who plays as a midfielder for Galway United.

== Playing career ==
Keohane began his football career in with youth teams Belvedere and Evergreen.

=== Wexford Youths ===
In 2009, Keohane joined League of Ireland First Division side Wexford Youths making his League of Ireland debut as a substitute on the opening day of the season.

During his first season, Keohane scored 2 league goals in 16 appearances.

=== Bristol City ===
On 13 August 2010, Keohane signed for Championship side Bristol City on a one-year contract for a reported €100,000.

In November 2010, Keohane signed a one-month loan deal at Southern League Division One South & West side Clevedon Town.

=== Exeter City ===
On 17 August 2011, Keohane signed for then League One side Exeter City on a free transfer after being released by Bristol City. He had impressed on trial in friendlies against Derby County and Chippenham Town.

Keohane made his professional debut on 24 August 2011, in the League Cup 3–1 defeat to Liverpool at St James Park, coming on as a first-half substitute for the injured Guillem Bauzà.

Keohane signed a new one-year contract with Exeter City in June 2012.

In 2012–13, Keohane scored his first goal for Exeter in a 2–1 win over York City at Bootham Crescent.

At the end of the 2013–2014 season, Keohane was rewarded with an extended contract. In pre-season 2014–15, Keohane was handed the number 10 jersey following the departure of Alan Gow. Keohane was also the club's top scorer in their pre-season tour of Brazil, netting 2 goals in 3 games.

He left the club at the end of the 2014–2015 season due to lack of game time.

=== Woking ===
On 30 August 2015, Keohane joined National League side Woking on a six-month deal upon his contract expiry from Exeter City. A day later, Keohane made his debut against Welling United, and scored after coming on as a Substitute.

After only making seven league starts and eight substitute appearances in the league for the Cards, Woking decided against extending his contract, so therefore he was released after the 2–1 victory over Aldershot Town.

=== Sligo Rovers ===
Keohane with Sligo Rovers in 2016

On 8 January 2016, Keohane joined Irish side Sligo Rovers until the end of the 2016 season. On 6 February 2016, Keohane was given the number 17 jersey ahead of the 2016 campaign.

=== Cork City ===
On 11 November 2016, Keohane joined Cork City. In his first season with the club, Cork won the League of Ireland Premier Division for the first time in 12 years.

=== Rochdale ===
On 1 February 2019, Keohane joined Rochdale until the end of the season. He was offered a new contract by Rochdale at the end of the 2018–19 season.

On 1 July 2019, Keohane signed a new two-year contract with Rochdale.

On 25 June 2021, Keohane signed a new two-year contract.

On 23 June 2023, Keohane signed a one-year extension at Rochdale.

=== Galway United ===
On 29 June 2024, Keohane signed for Galway United, re-joining his former Cork boss John Caulfield. Keohane was named captain of the side ahead of the 2026 season.

== Career statistics ==
As of 31 October 2026

Club	Season	League			Cup (Note: Includes FAI Cup and FA Cup matches.)		League Cup (Note: Includes League of Ireland Cup and Football League Cup matches.)		Europe		Other		Total	
Club	Season	Division	Apps	Goals	Apps	Goals	Apps	Goals	Apps	Goals	Apps	Goals	Apps	Goals
Wexford Youths	2009	First Division	16	2	2	0	1	0	—		—		19	2
Wexford Youths	2010	First Division	18	4	1	0	1	0	—		—		20	4
Wexford Youths	Total		34	6	3	0	2	0	—		—		39	6
Bristol City	2010–11	Championship	0	0	0	0	0	0	—		—		0	0
Clevedon Town (Loan)	2010–11	Division One South & West	5	1	0	0	—		—		2 (Note: Appearances in the Southern League Cup)	1	7	2
Exeter City	2011–12	League One	4	0	1	0	1	0	—		0	0	6	0
Exeter City	2012–13	League Two	33	3	0	0	0	0	—		1 (Note: Appearances in Football League Trophy/EFL Trophy)	0	34	3
Exeter City	2013–14	League Two	21	3	0	0	0	0	—		0	0	21	3
Exeter City	2014–15	League Two	23	3	1	0	1	0	—		1	0	26	3
Exeter City	Total		81	9	2	0	2	0	—		2	0	87	9
Woking	2015–16	National League	15	2	0	0	—		—		1	0	16	2
Sligo Rovers	2016	Premier Division	31	1	0	0	1	0	—		—		32	1
Cork City	2017	Premier Division	29	3	4	1	2	0	3 (Note: Appearances in UEFA Europa League)	0	2 (Note: 1 appearance in President of Ireland's Cup and 1 appearance in Munster Senior Cup)	0	40	4
Cork City	2018	Premier Division	33	6	4	0	1	0	4 (Note: 2 appearances in UEFA Champions League and 2 appearances in UEFA Europa League)	0	3 (Note: 1 appearance in President of Ireland's Cup and 2 appearances in Munster Senior Cup)	0	45	6
Cork City	Total		62	9	8	1	3	0	7	0	6	0	85	10
Rochdale	2018–19	League One	8	0	0	0	0	0	—		0	0	8	0
Rochdale	2019–20	League One	28	0	5	0	2	0	—		3	0	38	0
Rochdale	2020–21	League One	44	10	1	0	2	0	—		3	0	50	10
Rochdale	2021–22	League Two	26	2	1	0	2	0	—		2	0	31	2
Rochdale	2022–23	League Two	39	3	1	0	0	0	—		2	0	42	3
Rochdale	2023–24	National League	41	7	1	0	—		—		1 (Note: Appearances in FA Trophy)	0	43	7
Rochdale	Total		186	22	9	0	6	0	—		11	0	212	22
Galway United	2024	Premier Division	15	2	2	2	—		—		—		17	4
Galway United	2025	Premier Division	23	1	2	0	—		—		—		25	1
Galway United	2026	Premier Division	32	7	4	0	—		—		—		36	7
Galway United	Total		70	10	8	2	—		—		—		78	12
Career total			453	59	28	11	14	0	7	0	22	1	524	71

== Honours ==
Cork City

- League of Ireland Premier Division: 2017
- FAI President's Cup: 2017
- Munster Senior Cup: 2017

Individual

- Rochdale Player of the Year: 2020–21
