= Axel Piesold =

English footballer

Personal information
- Date of birth: 31 March 2005 (age 21)
- Place of birth: London, England
- Height: 1.78 m (5 ft 10 in)
- Position: Midfielder

Team information
- Current team: Galway United
- Number: 6

Youth career
- –2022: Tottenham Hotspur
- 2022: Dunstable Town
- 2023–2024: Luton Town

Senior career*
Years	Team	Apps	(Gls)
2023–2025	Luton Town	0	(0)
2024–2025	→ Cliftonville (loan)	25	(0)
2025–	Galway United	24	(1)
- * Club domestic league appearances and goals as of 31 October 2026 (UTC)

Axel Piesold (born 31 March 2005) is an English professional footballer who plays as a Midfielder for League of Ireland Premier Division club Galway United.

Piesold was born in London and played youth football with Tottenham Hotspur, Dunstable Town and Luton Town before starting his professional career on loan with Cliftonville before moving to Galway United in 2025.

== Youth career ==
Piesold began his youth career in the youth academy of Tottenham Hotspur. He was released by Spurs in 2022 and went on to join local non-league side Dunstable Town. He would then at the start of 2023 join the academy of Luton Town.

== Career ==
=== Luton Town ===
At the beginning of the 2023–24 Piesold made his first appearance on the bench for Luton in an FA Cup match vs Grimsby Town. Piesold went on to appear on the bench 9 times in the Premier League that season, however he never made a senior appearance for Luton.

==== Cliftonville (loan) ====
On 7 August 2024 it was announced that Piesold had joined NIFL Premiership side Cliftonville. Piesold made his debut on 11 August against Portadown. Piesold scored his first goal for Cliftonville against Banbridge Rangers in the Irish Cup. Piesold helped Cliftonville win the 2024–25 Irish League Cup and qualify for the UEFA Conference League during his season at the club.

=== Galway United ===
On 2 July 2025 it was announced Piesold had signed for League of Ireland Premier Division side Galway United. He made his debut for the club away against Drogheda United on 4 July.

== Career statistics ==
As of match played 30 October 2026

Appearances and goals by club, season and competition
Club	Season	League			National cup (Note: Includes Irish Cup, FAI Cup)		League cup (Note: Includes EFL Cup, Irish League Cup)		Other		Total	
Club	Season	Division	Apps	Goals	Apps	Goals	Apps	Goals	Apps	Goals	Apps	Goals
Luton Town	2023–24	Premier League	0	0	0	0	0	0	—		0	0
Cliftonville (loan)	2024–25	NIFL Premiership	25	0	4	1	5	0	4 (Note: Appearances in Conference League play-offs)	1	38	2
Galway United	2025	LOI Premier Division	10	0	3	0	—		—		13	0
Galway United	2026	LOI Premier Division	14	1	1	0	—		—		15	1
Galway United	Total		24	1	4	0	–		–		28	1
Career Total			40	1	8	1	5	0	4	1	66	3

== Honours ==
Cliftonville

- Irish League Cup: 2024–25
