= Wasiri Williams =

English footballer

Personal information
- Full name: Ola Wasiri Williams
- Date of birth: 1 April 2000 (age 26)
- Place of birth: London, England
- Height: 6 ft 2 in (1.88 m)
- Positions: Centre back; right back

Team information
- Current team: Galway United
- Number: 15

Senior career*
Years	Team	Apps	(Gls)
2018–2019	Bromley	0	(0)
2018	→ Ashford United (loan)	10	(0)
2018	→ Lewisham Borough (loan)	6	(0)
2018–2019	→ Tunbridge Wells (loan)	18	(1)
2019	Sheppey United	3	(0)
2019–2020	Lordswood	10	(0)
2020	Walton & Hersham	6	(0)
2020–2021	Staines Town	5	(0)
2021–2022	Corinthian-Casuals	14	(0)
2022	Braintree Town	9	(0)
2022–2023	Swansea City	0	(0)
2023	→ Dundalk (loan)	11	(0)
2023–2024	Partick Thistle	16	(0)
2024	Whitehawk	8	(1)
2025	Daugavpils	26	(1)
2026–	Galway United	30	(1)
- * Club domestic league appearances and goals as of 19:03, 10 November 2026 (UTC)

Ola Wasiri Williams (born 1 April 2000) is an English professional footballer who plays as a defender for League of Ireland Premier Division club Galway United.

== Career ==
=== Early career ===
Williams spent the early part of his career in the English non leagues, having spells at numerous clubs across the English non league football pyramid.

=== Swansea City ===
In June 2022 Williams was signed by English Championship side Swansea City on an initial one year deal, with the option to extend his deal by an additional year.

=== Dundalk (loan) ===
In February 2023 Williams joined League of Ireland Premier Division side Dundalk on a loan deal until June 2023, taking the number 22 shirt.

Williams departed Dundalk in June 2023.

=== Partick Thistle ===
In June 2023 Williams joined Scottish Championship side Partick Thistle on a two-year contract, taking the number 4 jersey.

Williams scored his first goal for Thistle in a 6–0 away win against Edinburgh City in Scottish League Cup group stages in July 2024.

Williams left Thistle in October 2024.

=== Whitehawk ===
Williams joined Isthmian Premier League side Whitehawk in November 2024. Williams scored his first goal for Whitehawk, scoring a stoppage time winner in the 99th minute in a 3-2 victory over Bognor Regis Town.

=== Daugavpils ===
In March 2025, Williams joined Latvian Higher League side Daugavpils. During his time at the club Williams played in the first European tie in the history of the club, during which he scored in the second-leg in his side’s 3-4 aggregate defeat to Albanian side Vllaznia in the 2025–26 UEFA Conference League.

=== Galway United ===
On 26 November 2025, Williams signed for League of Ireland Premier Division club Galway United ahead of their 2026 season.

== Career statistics ==
As of match played on 10 October 2026

Appearances and goals by club, season and competition
Club	Season	League			National Cup (Note: Includes FA Cup, FAI Cup, Scottish Cup & Latvian Cup)		League Cup (Note: Includes EFL Cup & Scottish League Cup)		Other		Total	
Club	Season	Division	Apps	Goals	Apps	Goals	Apps	Goals	Apps	Goals	Apps	Goals
Bromley	2017–18	National League	0	0	0	0	—		0	0	0	0
Bromley	2018–19	National League	0	0	0	0	—		0	0	0	0
Bromley	Total		0	0	0	0	—		0	0	0	0
Ashford United (loan)	2017–18	Isthmian League South Division	10	0	—		—		—		10	0
Lewisham Borough (loan)	2018–19	Southern Counties East League Division One	6	0	—		—		1 (Note: Appearance in the FA Vase)	0	7	0
Tunbridge Wells (loan)	2018–19	Southern Counties East League Premier Division	18	1	—		—		—		18	1
Sheppey United	2019–20	Southern Counties East League Premier Division	3	0	0	0	—		2 (Note: One appearance in the FA Vase, one in the Southern Counties East League Challenge Cup)	0	5	0
Lordswood	2019–20	Southern Counties East League Premier Division	10	0	—		—		—		10	0
Walton & Hersham	2019–20	Combined Counties League Division One	6	0	—		—		—		6	0
Staines Town	2020–21	Isthmian League South Central Division	5	0	2	0	—		1 (Note: Appearance in the FA Trophy)	0	8	0
Corinthian-Casuals	2021–22	Isthmian League Premier Division	14	0	8	0	—		2 (Note: One appearance in the FA Trophy, one in the Alan Turvey Trophy)	0	24	0
Braintree Town	2021–22	National League South	9	0	—		—		—		9	0
Swansea City	2022–23	Championship	0	0	0	0	0	0	—		0	0
Dundalk (loan)	2023	LOI Premier Division	11	0	—		—		1 (Note: Appearance in the Leinster Senior Cup)	0	12	0
Partick Thistle	2023–24	Scottish Championship	12	0	3	0	5	0	1 (Note: Appearance(s) in the Scottish Challenge Cup)	0	21	0
Partick Thistle	2024–25	Scottish Championship	4	0	—		4	1	0	0	8	1
Partick Thistle	Total		16	0	3	0	9	1	1	0	29	1
Whitehawk	2024–25	Isthmian League Premier Division	8	1	—		—		—		8	1
Daugavpils	2025	Latvian Higher League	26	1	2	0	—		2 (Note: Appearances in the UEFA Conference League)	1	30	2
Galway United	2026	LOI Premier Division	30	1	3	0	—		—		33	1
Career total			172	4	18	0	9	1	10	1	209	6
