= Al-Amin Kazeem =

English professional footballer

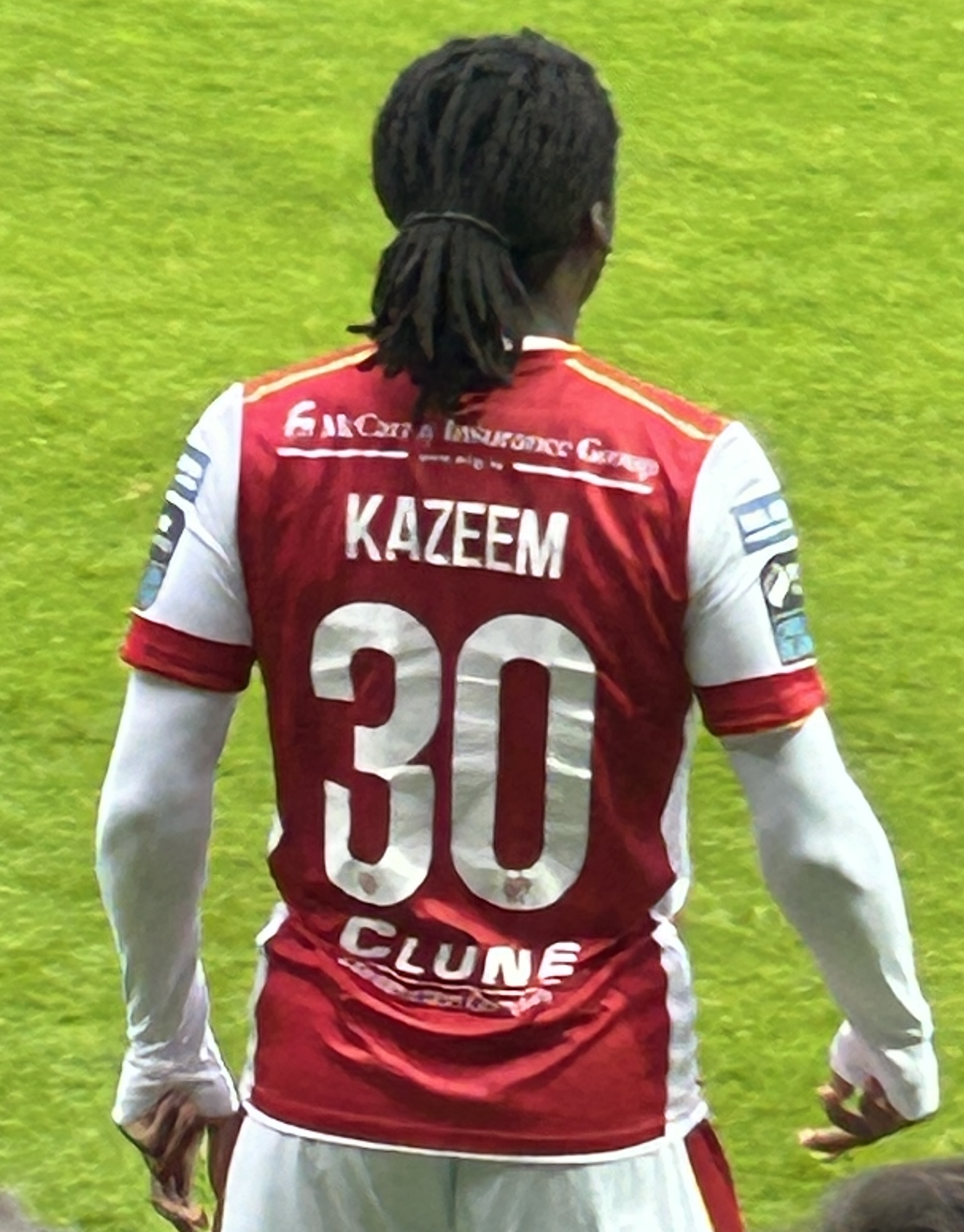
- Kazeem in action for St Patrick's Athletic in 2024.

Personal information
- Full name: Al-Amin Ayomide Kazeem
- Date of birth: 6 April 2002 (age 24)
- Height: 1.78 m (5 ft 10 in)
- Positions: Left-back; winger

Team information
- Current team: Galway United
- Number: 30

Youth career
- 2017–2019: Colchester United

Senior career*
| Years | Team | Apps | (Gls) |
| 2019–2024 | Colchester United | 33 | (0) |
| 2019–2020 | → Maldon & Tiptree (loan) | 23 | (1) |
| 2024 | → Galway United (loan) | 20 | (0) |
| 2024–2025 | St Patrick's Athletic | 21 | (1) |
| 2026– | Galway United | 16 | (0) |
- * Club domestic league appearances and goals as of 19:10, 10 November 2026 (UTC)

Al-Amin Ayomide Kazeem (born 6 April 2002) is an English professional footballer who plays as a left-back or winger for League of Ireland Premier Division club Galway United.

== Career ==
=== Maldon & Tiptree loan ===
Al-Amin Kazeem was signed by Colchester United as a youth player in 2017. He was sent out on loan to Isthmian League side Maldon & Tiptree for the 2019–20 season. He was a part of the side that reached the second round of the FA Cup for the first time in the club's history.

=== Colchester United ===
On returning from loan to Colchester United, Kazeem signed a two-year contract with The U's. Kazeem had to wait until the 2022–23 season to get his chance with the first team, making his debut in an EFL Cup game against Ipswich Town. He gained high praise for Colchester manager Wayne Brown, with the manager saying "I don't like to individualize after games but Al-Amin for me making his debut against a real top class (team)...I thought his one for one defending was exceptional."

==== Galway United loan ====
On 8 February 2024, Kazeem signed for newly promoted League of Ireland Premier Division side Galway United on a half-season loan. On 30 June 2024, the club announced that Kazeem had departed following the end of his loan spell, turning down a permanent contract offer from Galway after his Colchester United contract had expired on the same day.

=== St Patrick's Athletic ===
On 1 July 2024, Kazeem signed a multi-year contract with League of Ireland Premier Division club St Patrick's Athletic. He made his debut for the club on 4 July 2024, replacing Anthony Breslin in the 79th minute of a 1–0 loss away to Waterford. On 1 August 2024, he made his first career appearance in European competition, coming off the bench away to Vaduz of Liechtenstein as his side drew 2–2 at the Rheinpark Stadion for a 5–3 aggregate win, to set up a tie with Sabah of Azerbaijan. On 30 September 2024, Kazeem scored his first goal for the club, an 88th minute winner in a 3–2 victory in a Dublin Derby away to rivals Shelbourne which he scored with his first touch of the game having replaced Brandon Kavanagh from the bench a minute earlier. On 8 October 2024, Kazeem was part of the Pats side that defeated St Mochta's 2–1 in the final of the 2023–24 Leinster Senior Cup. On 20 July 2025, Kazeem scored his first goal of the season in an 8–0 win at home to UCC in the FAI Cup. On 14 August 2025, he made his first start in European competition, winning a penalty for his side after just 11 seconds in an eventual 3–2 loss away to Turkish giants Beşiktaş in the UEFA Conference League. He scored 2 goals in 38 appearances in all competitions during his 18 months at the club, before being released at the end of his contract in November 2025.

=== Galway United ===
On 6 January 2026, Kazeem returned to his former loan club Galway United, this time on a permanent basis ahead of the 2026 season.

== Style of play ==
Kazeem plays as a left-back primarily. He is very strong, quick and willing to defend, with his manager Wayne Brown stating after his debut "You've seen his fitness first and foremost but also his physical presence to get out to the ball and want to defend. "That's a rarity nowadays, where you have people who actually want to defend."

== International career ==
Kazeem is eligible to play for both England and Nigeria as he holds dual citizenship for both countries.

== Career statistics ==
As of match played 25 September 2026

Appearances and goals by club, season and competition
| Club | Season | League | | | National cup | | League cup | | Europe | | Other | | Total | |
| Club | Season | Division | Apps | Goals | Apps | Goals | Apps | Goals | Apps | Goals | Apps | Goals | Apps | Goals |
|---|---|---|---|---|---|---|---|---|---|---|---|---|---|---|
| Colchester United | 2020–21 | EFL League Two | 0 | 0 | 0 | 0 | 0 | 0 | — | | 0 (Note: Appearance(s) in the EFL Trophy) | 0 | 0 | 0 |
| Colchester United | 2021–22 | EFL League Two | 0 | 0 | 0 | 0 | 0 | 0 | — | | 0 | 0 | 0 | 0 |
| Colchester United | 2022–23 | EFL League Two | 20 | 0 | 0 | 0 | 2 | 0 | — | | 2 | 0 | 24 | 0 |
| Colchester United | 2023–24 | EFL League Two | 13 | 0 | 0 | 0 | 1 | 0 | — | | 0 | 0 | 14 | 0 |
| Colchester United | Total | | 33 | 0 | 0 | 0 | 3 | 0 | — | | 2 | 0 | 38 | 0 |
| Maldon & Tiptree (loan) | 2019–20 | Isthmian League North Division | 23 | 1 | 5 | 0 | — | | — | | 5 (Note: Appearance(s) in the FA Trophy) | 0 | 33 | 1 |
| Galway United (loan) | 2024 | LOI Premier Division | 20 | 0 | — | | — | | — | | — | | 20 | 0 |
| St Patrick's Athletic | 2024 | LOI Premier Division | 8 | 1 | 0 | 0 | — | | 3 (Note: Appearance(s) in the UEFA Conference League) | 0 | 2 (Note: Appearance(s) in the Leinster Senior Cup) | 0 | 13 | 1 |
| St Patrick's Athletic | 2025 | LOI Premier Division | 13 | 0 | 4 | 1 | — | | 3 | 0 | 5 | 0 | 25 | 1 |
| St Patrick's Athletic | Total | | 21 | 1 | 4 | 1 | — | | 6 | 0 | 7 | 0 | 38 | 2 |
| Galway United | 2026 | LOI Premier Division | 16 | 0 | 2 | 0 | — | | — | | — | | 18 | 0 |
| Career total | | | 113 | 2 | 11 | 1 | 3 | 0 | 6 | 0 | 14 | 0 | 147 | 3 |

== Honours ==
St Patrick's Athletic

- Leinster Senior Cup: 2023–24
