= Lee Devitt =

Irish footballer (born 2000)

Personal information
- Full name: Lee Devitt Molloy
- Date of birth: 3 June 2000 (age 26)
- Place of birth: Newmarket-on-Fergus, Clare, Ireland
- Height: 1.79 m (5 ft 10 in)
- Positions: Midfielder; winger; left-back

Team information
- Current team: Galway United
- Number: 20

Youth career
- Shannon Hibernians
- 2014–2019: Limerick

Senior career*
Years	Team	Apps	(Gls)
2019	Limerick	17	(5)
2020–2021	Cobh Ramblers	44	(3)
2022–2025	Treaty United	134	(24)
2026–	Galway United	35	(1)
- * Club domestic league appearances and goals as of 19:04, 10 November 2026 (UTC)

Lee Devitt Molloy (born 3 June 2000) is an Irish professional footballer who plays as a left-back for League of Ireland Premier Division club Galway United.

Devitt has also previously played as a midfielder and a winger for Limerick, Cobh Ramblers and Treaty United.

== Youth career ==
Devitt played youth football with Clare side Shannon Hibernians. Devitt joined Limerick's youth academy in 2014, he joined their U17s in July 2016 and their U19s in 2018.

== Career ==
=== Limerick ===
Devitt began playing with League of Ireland First Division club Limerick in the 2019 season, which would prove to be Limerick's last season in the League of Ireland.

=== Cobh Ramblers ===
In January 2020 Devitt joined League of Ireland First Division side Cobh Ramblers ahead of the 2020 season. After the 2020 season was cut short as a result of the COVID-19 pandemic, Devitt would re-sign with the Ramblers for the 2021 season.

=== Treaty United ===
On 4 December 2021, Devitt returned to Markets Field signing for recently founded League of Ireland First Division side Treaty United ahead of only their second season as a club. At the end of the season Devitt scored in the promotion/relegation play-offs against Waterford as Treaty lost 7–4 on aggregate.

At the end of the 2025 season after Treaty lost the promotion play-off final to Bray Wanderers, Devitt would leave Treaty United having won their player of the year award three years in a row, as well as making the PFAI Team of the Year in his final season.

=== Galway United ===
On 2 December 2025, Devitt signed for League of Ireland Premier Division club Galway United ahead of their 2026 season.

== Career statistics ==
=== Club ===
As of match played 30 October 2026

Appearances and goals by club, season and competition
Club	Season	League			National cup (Note: Includes the FAI Cup)		League cup (Note: Includes the League of Ireland Cup)		Other		Total	
Club	Season	Division	Apps	Goals	Apps	Goals	Apps	Goals	Apps	Goals	Apps	Goals
Limerick	2019	LOI First Division	17	5	2	0	1	0	0 (Note: Appearances in the Munster Senior Cup)	0	20	5
Cobh Ramblers	2020	LOI First Division	18	2	1	0	1	0	0	0	20	1
Cobh Ramblers	2021	LOI First Division	26	1	2	0	—		—		28	1
Cobh Ramblers	Total		44	3	3	0	1	0	0	0	48	3
Treaty United	2022	LOI First Division	30	0	4	1	—		3 (Note: One appearance in the Munster Senior Cup; two appearances, one goal in the 2022 promotion/relegation play-offs)	1	37	2
Treaty United	2023	LOI First Division	35	2	1	0	—		2	1	38	3
Treaty United	2024	LOI First Division	33	7	3	3	—		2	0	38	10
Treaty United	2025	LOI First Division	36	15	1	1	—		5 (Note: Two appearances in the Munster Senior Cup; three appearances in the 2025 League of Ireland play-offs)	0	36	16
Treaty United	Total		134	24	9	5	—		12	2	155	31
Galway United	2026	LOI Premier Division	35	1	4	1	—		—		39	2
Career total			230	33	18	6	2	0	12	2	262	41
