= John Fitzgerald (footballer) =

Irish footballer

Personal information
- Full name: John Fitzgerald
- Date of birth: 10 February 1984 (age 42)
- Place of birth: Cabinteely, Dublin, Ireland
- Height: 6 ft 2 in (1.88 m)
- Position: Centre back

Youth career
- St. Joseph's Boys
- 2000–2002: Blackburn Rovers

Senior career*
Years	Team	Apps	(Gls)
2002–2005	Blackburn Rovers	0	(0)
2005–2007	Bury	64	(3)
2007–2008	Galway United	43	(2)
2009	Melbourne Knights	19	(1)
2010	Oakleigh Cannons	17	(2)
2012	Southern Stars	12	(1)
2013	South Springvale	13	(1)
2015	St Kilda SC	9	(3)

International career
2000	Republic of Ireland U16	1	(0)
	Republic of Ireland U21	14	(1)
- * Club domestic league appearances and goals

John Fitzgerald (born 10 February 1984) was an Irish footballer.

Fitzgerald started his career with Park Celtic. He later moved to St. Josephs Boys and then Blackburn Rovers. He represented Republic of Ireland Under-20 team at the 2003 FIFA World Youth Championship. He joined Galway United from Bury.

Fitzgerald captained Galway United on several occasions.
