= Eddie van Boxtel =

Irish footballer (born 1973)

Personal information
- Date of birth: 14 August 1973 (age 53)
- Place of birth: Amsterdam, Netherlands
- Position: Goalkeeper

Youth career
- –1990: Home Farm
- 1990–1991: Leeds United

Senior career*
Years	Team	Apps	(Gls)
1991–1996	Dundalk	64	(0)
1996–1997	Galway United	20	(0)
1997–1998	Drogheda United	11	(0)
1998–2000	Monaghan United	47	(0)
1998–2000	Bray Wanderers	12	(0)
Total		154	(0)
- * Club domestic league appearances and goals

Edward van Boxtel (born 6 August 1973) is a Dutch-Irish former footballer who is last known to have played as a goalkeeper for Bray Wanderers.

== Early life ==
Van Boxtel was born in Amsterdam, the Netherlands, In 1973, and grew up in Ballymun, Republic of Ireland.

== Club career ==
As a youth player, Van Boxtel joined the youth academy of English side Leeds. In 2001, he underwent leg surgery after suffering an injury. During his playing career, he was regarded as a controversial player. His last club as a professional player was Irish side Bray Wanderers.

== International career ==
Van Boxtel represented the Republic of Ireland internationally at youth level.

== Managerial career ==
Van Boxtel managed Irish side Sandyhill Celtic.

== Personal life ==
Van Boxtel is the son of a Dutch father and an Irish mother.
