= Denis Clarke =

Irish footballer

Personal information
- Date of birth: 10 September 1959 (age 67)
- Place of birth: Athlone, Republic of Ireland

Youth career
- Athlone Town

Senior career*
Years	Team	Apps	(Gls)
1976–1977	Manchester City	0	(0)
1976–1977	Bolton Wanderers	0	(0)
1977–1978	Finn Harps	4	(0)
1978–1982	Athlone Town	121	(32)
1982–1983	Shamrock Rovers	26	(2)
1983–1986	Athlone Town	65	(19)
1986–1987	Limerick City	13	(2)
1987–1992	Athlone Town	?	(?)
1995–1996	Galway United	3	(0)

International career
1979	League of Ireland XI	1	(0)

Managerial career
- Athlone Town
- Athlone Town
- 1995–1997: Galway United
- * Club domestic league appearances and goals

Denis Clarke (born 10 April 1959) is an Irish former football player.

He started his career at Finn Harps ( 6 total games) after returning home from City, making his League of Ireland debut on 23 October 1977. He moved to his hometown club later that season and joined Shamrock Rovers in 1982. During his time in the Hoops he played in four UEFA Cup games including a League of Ireland record 7–0 aggregate win over Fram Reykjavik. In September 1983 he sought a move from Glenmalure Park.

He rejoined Athlone Town in November 1983.

From there he signed for Limerick City in May 1986.

However, he only lasted half a season before rejoining Athlone for a third time and getting sent off on his third return.

Clarke managed Athlone twice. In November 1995 he was appointed caretaker manager of Galway United. In April 1996 he signed a 3-year full-time contract as manager. In 2012, Clarke managed Willow Park F.C. U'10's up until 2017 when he departed after the U16 season.

== Honours ==
=== As a player ===
- League of Ireland: 2
  - Athlone Town A.F.C. – 1980–81, 1982–83
- League of Ireland First Division
  - Athlone Town A.F.C. – 1987–88
- League of Ireland Cup: 2
  - Athlone Town A.F.C. – 1979–80, 1981–82
- Leinster Senior Cup
  - Athlone Town 1987/88
- Dublin City Cup
  - Shamrock Rovers 1983/84

=== As a manager ===
- League of Ireland Cup
  - Galway United F.C. – 1996/97

== Sources ==
- Paul Doolan; Robert Goggins. The Hoops. ISBN 0-7171-2121-6.
