= Galway United F.C. =

Galway United
- Full name: Galway United Football Club
- Nicknames: The Tribesmen; Maroon Army (supporters)
- Short name: United
- Founded: 1937
- Stadium: Eamonn Deacy Park
- Capacity: 4,323 (3,300 seats)
- Owner: Galway United Friends Co-operative Limited
- Chairman: Jonathan Corbett
- Manager: John Caulfield
- League: League of Ireland Premier Division
- 2026: 8th of 10
- Website: galwayunitedfc.ie
Home colours	Away colours	Third colours

Galway United Football Club (Irish: Cumann Peile Ghaillimh Aontaithe) is an Irish professional football club based in Galway. They play in the League of Ireland Premier Division, following a promotion from the First Division in 2023. The team was founded as Galway Rovers F.C. during the 1930s. They made their League of Ireland debut in the 1977–78 season, and changed their name to Galway United in 1981–82. After suffering financial difficulties, the club dropped out of the League of Ireland after the 2011 season, but in 2014 Galway United returned, initially playing as Galway F.C. for a season. Like other sports teams from the county, Galway United are nicknamed "The Tribesmen", after the 14 "tribes" of Galway, the merchant families that established the city.

== History ==
=== Galway Rovers ===
Galway United F.C. were founded as Galway Rovers F.C.. The club was established in the Claddagh district of Galway. The club's website claims the club was founded in 1937. However, according to a Galway Advertiser report, the club was active in 1933, winning a local junior competition known as the Celtic Shield. The first recorded mention of a Rovers team dates back to a meeting at 28 Dominick Street on 20 September 1898 but it's not known if this was related to the future Rovers club. By 1937 Rovers were fielding youth teams as well as a junior side. Rovers won the Connacht Junior Cup in 1958 and they also played in the Western League. Rovers first gained national attention when they were invited to play in the 1976–77 League of Ireland Cup. In 1977–78 they made their debut in the League of Ireland. They played their first League of Ireland game on 28 August 1977 at Terryland Park against St. Patrick's Athletic. Eamonn Deacy scored Rovers' first League of Ireland goal on 2 October 1977.

Chart of yearly table positions for Galway United in League of Ireland

=== 1980s ===
In 1980–81 Rovers reached the League of Ireland Cup final, but lost on penalties to Dundalk. In the 1981–82 season, Galway Rovers changed their name to Galway United and under their new name, the club reached two cup finals in successive seasons. United made their first appearance in an FAI Cup final in 1985 but lost 1–0 to Shamrock Rovers. In 1985–86 United became founder members of the League of Ireland Premier Division and finished second behind Shamrock Rovers in the new division's inaugural season. In 1985–86 United won its first major trophy after defeating Dundalk 2–0 in the League of Ireland Cup final. Denis Bonner and Paul McGee scored the vital goals.

=== 1990s ===
Galway United made a good start to the 1990s, winning their first FAI Cup and qualifying for Europe for a third time. In the 1991 FAI Cup final at Lansdowne Road, United defeated Shamrock Rovers 1–0. With five minutes to go on the clock, captain Johnny Glynn scored a late goal. In 1991–92 United was relegated to the First Division for the first time, but the following season, 1992–93, they returned to the Premier Division after winning the First Division title and the League of Ireland First Division Shield. The club finished 1993–94 in 3rd place.

In 1995–96 United were relegated for a second time. In 1996–97 United won the League of Ireland Cup defeating Cork City 4–2 over two legs along with the First Division Shield. It was the second time United had won both trophies.

United remained in the First Division until 1998–99 when, under Don O'Riordan, they were promoted to the Premier Division after finishing as runners-up in the First Division to Drogheda United.

=== 2000s and decline ===
The 2000s were not a successful decade for Galway United. Ten different managers took charge of United during this era and, between them, they managed to win just one amateur trophy, the 2007–08 Connacht Senior Cup. In 2001–02 United were relegated to the League of Ireland First Division and they did not return to the Premier Division until 2007. In April 2005 United appointed Nick Leeson as commercial manager. He then became general manager in late November 2005 and by July 2007 he had become the club's CEO. By the end of the decade United were joined in the League of Ireland by two other Galway–based teams, Mervue United and Salthill Devon.

=== 2010s demise and rise ===
By 2010 Galway United had debts estimated to be between €35,000 and €70,000. In 2011, after Nick Leeson resigned as CEO, the Galway United board of directors and the Galway United Supporters Trust ("GUST"), which had been established in 2001, came to an agreement under which the latter group took over financial responsibility for the club and the day-to-day running of the team. However, after the 2011 League of Ireland Premier Division season, in which Galway United lost 32 out of 36 games, this arrangement broke down. In December 2011 it was announced that Galway United would not be competing in the 2012 League of Ireland First Division season. Meanwhile, GUST unsuccessfully applied to join the League of Ireland as an independent club and continued to support the Galway United team playing in the League of Ireland U19 Division.

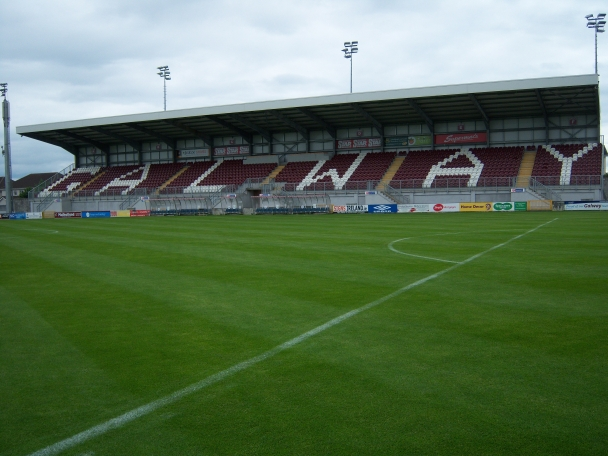
Galway United's home ground, Eamonn Deacy Park

In 2012 a report commissioned by the Football Association of Ireland (FAI) recommended that Galway city and County Galway should be represented in the League of Ireland by a single club or team based at Eamonn Deacy Park. The O'Connor Report also recommended that GUST, Salthill Devon, Mervue United and the Galway Football Association, should work together to form such a club. GUST was reluctant to support this "merger" but eventually agreed.

Following the conclusion of the 2013 season, both Mervue United and Salthill Devon withdrew from the League of Ireland First Division to make way for a team known as Galway F.C. A new board of directors was established featuring representatives from GUST, Salthill Devon, Mervue United and the GFA. In 2014 Galway F.C. played in the First Division and after finishing third and winning a play-off they gained promotion to the 2015 League of Ireland Premier Division. Before the start of the season Galway F.C. was renamed Galway United. In 2015 the club had the opportunity to record a third League of Ireland Cup success when they played St. Patrick's Athletic in the final at Eamonn Deacy Park, however they lost the tie 4–3 in a penalty shoot out following a scoreless draw.

On 27 October 2017, Galway United were relegated to the League of Ireland First Division after a 4–3 loss to Dundalk in their final game of the 2017 League of Ireland Premier Division at Eamonn Deacy Park. Despite finishing the 2017 season in 10th place, a normally safe position, a change in league format ahead of the 2018 season meant that this was not enough for the club to retain its place in the top flight.

=== 2020s ===
It was announced on 30 March 2022, that brothers Brian and Luke Comer of the Comer Property Group would be granted an option to acquire the majority ownership of the football club which had been operating under a fan owned model since its re-emergence in 2014. Following a vote of the members of the Galway United Friends Co-operative Limited, 82% backed the move which would see the Comer brothers take an option to acquire an 85% ownership stake in the club. The club remains 100% owned by Galway United Friends Co-operative Limited. The Comer brothers announced an initial influx of half a million euro into the club with ambitions to take it back to the Premier Division.

In October 2022, the club announced that it would be launching a women's team, to compete in League of Ireland Women's Premier Division from the 2023 season onwards. On 23 July 2023 the women's team made history by winning the inaugural All-Island Cup in their maiden season, defeating Cliftonville Ladies F.C. 1–0 in the final at The Showgrounds, Sligo.

On 22 September 2023, Galway United won the League of Ireland First Division title for the second time in the club's history with five matches to spare, when they defeated Kerry FC 4–0. This ensured a return to top flight football for the first time since 2017. They finished the league season with a record total of 94 points, with 98 goals scored and a 100% home win record.

== Grounds ==
Galway United's principal home ground is Eamonn Deacy Park, previously known as Terryland Park. In 1993 while Terryland Park underwent redevelopment, Galway United played their matches at the Galway Sportsgrounds and at Crowley Park. In 1985 Galway United also played a home European game at the Sportsgrounds. On the other two occasions United qualified for Europe they played their home games at the home grounds of Carraroe GAA and Ballinderreen GAA.

During the 2026 season, as a result of drainage work being done on Eammon Deacy Prak, Galway United played their games at the home of Galway GAA, Pearse Stadium. On 12 June 2026, Galway United played Dundalk in Turners Cross in Cork as there was no available venue in Galway for the match.

== Players ==
=== First Team Squad ===
As of 4 November 2026

Note: Flags indicate national team as defined under FIFA eligibility rules; some limited exceptions apply. Players may hold more than one non-FIFA nationality.

No.	Pos.	Nation	Player
4	MF	IRL	Jimmy Keohane (Captain)
5	DF	IRL	Killian Brouder
6	MF	ENG	Axel Piesold
7	FW	IRL	Stephen Walsh
8	MF	IRL	Aaron Bolger
9	FW	IRL	Francely Lomboto
10	MF	IRL	David Hurley (Vice-captain)
11	MF	CAN	Kris Twardek
12	DF	CAN	Gianfranco Facchineri
14	MF	ENG	Matty Wolfe

No.	Pos.	Nation	Player
15	DF	ENG	Wasiri Williams
16	GK	POR	Hugo Cunha
17	MF	IRL	Junior Thiam
20	MF	IRL	Lee Devitt
24	MF	IRL	Ed McCarthy
27	FW	IRL	Dara McGuinness
28	DF	IRL	James Morahan
30	DF	ENG	Al-Amin Kazeem
32	GK	SCO	Vincent Angelini

=== Under-20 Squad ===
As of 2026

Note: Flags indicate national team as defined under FIFA eligibility rules; some limited exceptions apply. Players may hold more than one non-FIFA nationality.

No.	Pos.	Nation	Player
35	GK	IRL	Eoin Doyle
40	GK	IRL	MacDarragh Scanlon
—	DF	IRL	Karl Bona
—	DF	IRL	Lúc Griallais
—	DF	IRL	Dara Hislop
—	DF	IRL	Rory McKeon
—	MF	IRL	Charlie Campbell
—	MF	IRL	Daithi Casey
—	MF	IRL	Tomiwa Lofinmakin

No.	Pos.	Nation	Player
—	MF	IRL	Fionn McNamara
—	MF	IRL	Luca Menarini
—	MF	IRL	Keelan Mullin
—	MF	IRL	Cillian Smyth
54	MF	IRL	Connor Whittaker
31	MF	IRL	Donnacha Sammon
—	FW	IRL	JJ Oifoh
—	FW	IRL	Jack Sweeney

Numbers shown display numbers worn during appearances for senior team

=== Club captains ===
Name	Period
(Republic of Ireland) Nigel Keady	2005–2006
(Saint Vincent and the Grenadines) Wesley Charles	2007
(Republic of Ireland) John Fitzgerald	2008
(Republic of Ireland) Jay O'Shea	2009
(Republic of Ireland) Barry Ryan	2010
(Republic of Ireland) Paul Sinnott	2011–2015
(Republic of Ireland) Ryan Connolly	2016
(Republic of Ireland) Colm Horgan	2017
(Republic of Ireland) Ryan Connolly	2018
(Republic of Ireland) Stephen Walsh	2019
(Republic of Ireland) Shane Duggan	2020
(Republic of Ireland) Conor McCormack	2021–2024
(Republic of Ireland) Greg Cunningham	2025
(Republic of Ireland) Jimmy Keohane	2026–

=== Player of the Year ===
Name	Year
(Republic of Ireland) Ryan Connolly	2014
(United States) Jake Keegan	2015
(Republic of Ireland) Kevin Devaney	2016
(Republic of Ireland) Conor Barry	2018
(Republic of Ireland) Maurice Nugent	2019
(Republic of Ireland) Shane Duggan	2020
(Republic of Ireland) Wilson Waweru	2021
(Republic of Ireland) Stephen Walsh	2022
(Republic of Ireland) David Hurley	2023
(Republic of Ireland) Brendan Clarke	2024
(Republic of Ireland) Stephen Walsh	2025
(Republic of Ireland) Aaron Bolger	2026

== Technical staff ==
Position	Name
Manager	John Caulfield
Assistant Manager	Richie Holland
First Team Analyst	Robbie Crosbie
Opposition Analyst	Mark Herrick
Strength & Conditioning Coach	Danny Broderick
Team Operations	Robbie O'Sullivan
Physiotherapist	Richard Grier
Goalkeeping Coach	Gianluca Aimi
Academy Manager	Sean Kimberley

== European record ==
=== Overview ===
Competition	Matches	W	D	L	GF	GA
UEFA Cup	2	0	0	2	2	8
European Cup Winners' Cup	4	0	0	4	2	11
TOTAL	6	0	0	6	4	19

=== Matches ===
Season	Competition	Round	Opponent	Home	Away	Aggregate
1985–86	European Cup Winners' Cup	1R	(Denmark) Lyngby	2–3	0–1	2–4
1986–87	UEFA Cup	1R	(Netherlands) Groningen	1–3	1–5	2–8
1991–92	European Cup Winners' Cup	QR	(Denmark) Odense	0–3	0–4	0–7

== Shirt sponsors and manufacturers ==
Year	Kit manufacturer	Shirt partner
1984/85	Adidas	Glen C
1985/86	Adidas	Glen C
1990/91		Wrangler
1991/92	Spall	Wrangler
1992/93	O'Neills	Wrangler
1993/94	O'Neills	McDonald's Gaillimh
1994/95	Adidas	McDonald's Gaillimh
1995/96	Adidas	Digital
1996/97	Adidas	Digital
1997/98	Adidas	Digital
1998/99	Adidas	Digital
1999/00	Adidas	Compaq
2000/01	Prostar	Compaq
2001/02	Stanno	Compaq
2002/03	Erreà	Hewlett-Packard
2003	Erreà	Radisson SAS Hotel Galway
2004	Umbro	Harmack Developments
2005	Umbro	Harmack Developments
2006	Umbro	Harmack Developments
2007	Umbro	O'Connell Drylining
2008	Rival	O'Connell Drylining
2009	Rival	Papa John's
2010	Rival	Papa John's
2011	Rival	Papa John's
2014	Macron	Comer Group Ireland
2015	Macron	Comer Group Ireland
2016	Uhlsport	Comer Group Ireland
2017	Uhlsport	Comer Group Ireland
2018	Uhlsport	Comer Group Ireland
2019	Puma	Comer Group Ireland
2020	Puma	Comer Group Ireland
2021	O'Neills	Comer Group Ireland
2022	O'Neills	Comer Group Ireland
2023	O'Neills	Comer Group Ireland
2024	O'Neills	Comer Group Ireland
2025	O'Neills	Comer Group Ireland
2026	O'Neills	Comer Group Ireland

== Notable former players ==
Republic of Ireland senior internationals

- (Republic of Ireland) Fran Brennan
- (Republic of Ireland) Greg Cunningham
- (Republic of Ireland) Eamonn Deacy
- (Republic of Ireland) Amby Fogarty
- (Republic of Ireland) David Forde
- (Republic of Ireland) John Herrick
- (Republic of Ireland) Jeff Kenna
- (Republic of Ireland) Jim McDonagh
- (Republic of Ireland) Paul McGee
- (Republic of Ireland) Ryan Manning
- (Republic of Ireland) Paddy Mulligan
- (Republic of Ireland) Peter Thomas

League of Ireland XI representatives

- (Republic of Ireland) Denis Clarke
- (Republic of Ireland) John Herrick
- (Republic of Ireland) Des Kennedy
- (Republic of Ireland) Gary Rogers
- (Republic of Ireland) John Russell
- (Republic of Ireland) Karl Sheppard
- (Netherlands) Eddie van Boxtel
- (Republic of Ireland) Larry Wyse
- (England) Johnny Matthews

Republic of Ireland U23 internationals

- (Republic of Ireland) Seamus Conneely
- (Republic of Ireland) Shane Guthrie
- (Republic of Ireland) Stephen O'Donnell
- (Republic of Ireland) Jay O'Shea

Republic of Ireland U21 internationals

- (Republic of Ireland) Seamus Conneely
- (Republic of Ireland) Pat Dolan
- (Republic of Ireland) John Fitzgerald
- (Republic of Ireland) Tony Folan
- (Republic of Ireland) Alan Gough
- (Republic of Ireland) Stephen Grant
- (Republic of Ireland) Jay O'Shea
- (Republic of Ireland) Karl Sheppard
- (Republic of Ireland) Rory Hale
- (Republic of Ireland) Alex Murphy

Republic of Ireland U19 internationals

- (Republic of Ireland) Mick Cooke
- (Republic of Ireland) Laurence Gaughan
- (Republic of Ireland) Conor Gethins
- (Republic of Ireland) Ger Hanley
- (Republic of Ireland) John Russell
- (Republic of Ireland) Cillian Tollett

Republic of Ireland U18 internationals

- (Republic of Ireland) Ryan Casey
- (Republic of Ireland) Donal Higgins
- (Republic of Ireland) Don O'Riordan
- (Republic of Ireland) Adam O'Halloran
- (Republic of Ireland) Brian Cunningham

Other senior internationals

- (Barbados) Eric Lavine
- (Barbados) Ryan Lucas
- (Barbados) Llewellyn Riley
- (Barbados) Alvin Rouse
- (Canada) Kris Twardek
- (England) Frank Worthington
- (Haiti) Regillio Nooitmeer
- (Haiti) Frantz Pierrot
- (Kenya) Jonah Ayunga
- (Madagascar) Bastien Héry
- (New Zealand) Moses Dyer
- (Saint Vincent and the Grenadines) Wesley Charles
- (Trinidad and Tobago) Malcolm Shaw

== Managerial history ==
Dates	Name
1976–1978	(Republic of Ireland) Amby Fogarty
1978–1979	(Scotland) Tommy Callaghan
1979–1983	(Republic of Ireland) John Herrick
1983–1984	(Republic of Ireland) Paddy Mulligan
1984–1985	(Republic of Ireland) Tom Lally
1985–1988	(Republic of Ireland) Tony Mannion
1988	(Republic of Ireland) John Herrick
1988–1989	(Republic of Ireland) Seamus McDonagh
1989–1990	(Republic of Ireland) Paul McGee
1990–1991	(Republic of Ireland) Joey Malone
1992–1995	(Republic of Ireland) Tony Mannion
1995–1997	(Republic of Ireland) Denis Clarke
1997–2001	(Republic of Ireland) Don O'Riordan
2001	(Republic of Ireland) Dave Connell
2001–2004	(Republic of Ireland) Tony Mannion
2005–2006	(Republic of Ireland) Stephen Lally
2006–2008	(Republic of Ireland) Tony Cousins
2008	(Republic of Ireland) Jeff Kenna
2009	(England) Ian Foster
2010–2011	(Northern Ireland) Sean Connor
2014–2016	(Republic of Ireland) Tommy Dunne
2017–2018	(Republic of Ireland) Shane Keegan
2018–2020	(Republic of Ireland) Alan Murphy
2021–	(Republic of Ireland) John Caulfield

== Honours ==
- League of Ireland Premier Division
  - Runners Up: 1985–86: 1
- FAI Cup
  - Winners: 1990–91: 1
  - Runners Up: 1984–85: 1
- League of Ireland Cup
  - Winners: 1985–86, 1996–97: 2
  - Runners Up: 1980–81, 2015: 2
- League of Ireland First Division
  - Winners: 1992–93, 2023: 2
  - Runners Up: 1998–99:, 2021 2
- League of Ireland First Division Shield:
  - Winners: 1992–93, 1996–97: 2
- Connacht Senior League
  - Winners: 1984–85, 1985–86, 1987–88: 3
  - Runners Up: 1986–87, 1993–94: 2
- Connacht Senior Cup
  - Winners: 1984–85, 1995–96, 2007–08: 3
- Connacht Senior League Challenge Cup
  - Winners: 1998–99: 1
  - Runners Up: 1986–87, 1993–94: 2
- Connacht Junior Cup
  - Winners: 1957–58: 1
  - Runners Up: 1946–47: 1
