= List of foreign League of Ireland players =

This is a list of foreign players (players from outside of the island of Ireland) to have played for League of Ireland clubs.

Note: Flags indicate national team as defined under FIFA eligibility rules. Players may hold more than one non-FIFA nationality.

Current Players will be Listed in BOLD.

== Africa (CAF) ==
=== Algeria ===
- (Algeria) Wassim Aouachria – Waterford, Galway United

=== Angola ===
- (Angola) Manuel Kaguako – Dundalk, Drogheda United
- (Angola) José Quitongo – Waterford
- (Angola) Rudy – Waterford

=== Benin ===
- (Benin) Romuald Boco – Sligo Rovers

=== Botswana ===
- (Botswana) Renei Batlokwa – Athlone Town

=== Burundi ===
- (Burundi) Aime Kitenge – St Patrick's Athletic

=== Cameroon ===
- (Cameroon) **Jeannot Esua** – Galway United, Sligo Rovers
- (Cameroon) Joseph N'Do – St Patrick's Athletic, Shelbourne, Shamrock Rovers, Bohemians, Sligo Rovers, Limerick
- (Cameroon) Maxim Kouogun – UCD, Waterford, Shelbourne
- (Cameroon) George Mukete – Athlone Town
- (Cameroon) Arthur Nganou – Cobh Ramblers, Kerry

=== Cape Verde ===
- (Cape Verde) **Pico Lopes** – Bohemians, Shamrock Rovers
- (Cape Verde) **Karim Fonseca** **– Cork City**

=== Central African Republic ===
- (Central African Republic) Wilfried Zahibo – Dundalk

=== Congo ===
- (Republic of the Congo) Will Hondermarck – Drogheda United
- (Republic of the Congo) Gaius Makouta – Longford Town

=== DR Congo ===
- (Democratic Republic of the Congo) **Aime Azende** – Bray Wanderers
- (Democratic Republic of the Congo) Patrick Kanyuka – Limerick
- (Democratic Republic of the Congo) Christian Lotefa – Cabinteely, Athlone Town
- (Democratic Republic of the Congo) Lido Lotefa – Dundalk, Longford Town
- (Democratic Republic of the Congo) Paul Matondo – Drogheda United
- (Democratic Republic of the Congo) Harlain Mbayo – Cobh Ramblers
- (Democratic Republic of the Congo) Patrick Nzuzi – Limerick, Sligo Rovers

=== Eritrea ===
- (Eritrea) Maill Lundgren – Shelbourne

=== Equatorial Guinea ===
- (Equatorial Guinea) Charles Ondo – Waterford
- (Equatorial Guinea) Baba Issaka – St Patrick's Athletic, Kilkenny City, Dundalk, Kildare County, Athlone Town

=== Ghana ===
- (Ghana) Ali Abbas – Limerick
- (Ghana) Prince Agyemang – Limerick
- (Ghana) Joe Aidoo – Cork City
- (Ghana) **Joseph Anang** – St Patrick's Athletic
- (Ghana) Raphael Ohin – Treaty United
- (Ghana) Michael Peprah – Athlone Town

=== Guinea ===
- (Guinea) Maï Traoré – Sligo Rovers

=== Guinea Bissau ===
- (Guinea-Bissau) Junior Quitirna – Waterford

=== Ivory Coast ===
- (Ivory Coast) Moussa Bakayoko – Derry City

=== Kenya ===
- (Kenya) Jonah Ayunga – Sligo Rovers, Galway United
- (Kenya) Henry Ochieng – Cork City
- (Kenya) Clarke Oduor – Bohemians

=== Liberia ===
- (Liberia) George Miller – St Patrick's Athletic
- (Liberia) Garmondeh Ta-Uway – Athlone Town

=== Libya ===
- (Libya) Muhanned Bukhatwa – Shamrock Rovers B
- (Libya) Éamon Zayed – Bray Wanderers, Drogheda United, Sporting Fingal, Derry City, Shamrock Rovers, Sligo Rovers

=== Madagascar ===
- (Madagascar) Bastien Héry – Limerick, Waterford, Bohemians, Derry City, Finn Harps, Galway United, Longford Town, Athlone Town
- (Madagascar) Mathyas Randriamamy – Kerry

=== Malawi ===
- (Malawi) Jubril Okedina – Bohemians

=== Morocco ===
- (Morocco) Sami Ben Amar – Dundalk
- (Morocco) Samir Boughanem – Shamrock Rovers
- (Morocco) Khalid El Khaliffi – Sligo Rovers

=== Niger ===
- (Niger) Karim El-Khebir – St Patrick's Athletic

=== Nigeria ===
- (Nigeria) **Ifunanyachi Achara** – Bray Wanderers
- (Nigeria) Ola Adeyemo – UCD, Wexford, Longford Town
- (Nigeria) Ismahil Akinade – Bray Wanderers, Bohemians, Waterford
- (Nigeria) **Goforth Amedu** – Waterford
- (Nigeria) Victor Arong – Drogheda United
- (Nigeria) Zishim Bawa – Drogheda United
- (Nigeria) Victor Ekanem – Longford Town, Drogheda United, Cabinteely, Athlone Town
- (Nigeria) Efan Ekoku – Dublin City
- (Nigeria) Willie Enubele – Galway United
- (Nigeria) James Igwilo – Shelbourne
- (Nigeria) Dominic Iorfa – Cork City, Waterford
- (Nigeria) Oladapo Kayode – Derry City
- (Nigeria) Tzee Mustapha – St Patrick's Athletic, Athlone Town, Waterford United
- (Nigeria) **Nnabuike Nneji** – Salthill Devon
- (Nigeria) Michael Nwankwo – Cork City
- (Nigeria) Nathan Oduwa – Dundalk
- (Nigeria) Jason Oladele – Longford Town
- (Nigeria) Joseph Olowu – Cork City
- (Nigeria) Emeka Onwubiko – Bray Wanderers, Athlone Town, Shamrock Rovers B
- (Nigeria) Owen Oseni – Waterford
- (Nigeria) Michael Osobe – Dundalk
- (Nigeria) Ajibula Sule – Shelbourne, Cabinteely
- (Nigeria) Fuad Sule – St Patrick's Athletic, Bohemians
- (Nigeria) Marco Tagbajumi – Dundalk

=== Senegal ===
- (Senegal) Ibrahima Thiam – Drogheda United

=== Sierra Leone ===
- (Sierra Leone) Mamoud Mansaray – Athlone Town
- (Sierra Leone) **John Bilili Sesay** – Bray Wanderers

=== Somalia ===
- (Somalia) Haji Abdikadir – Athlone Town

=== South Africa ===
- (South Africa) BJ Banda – Finn Harps
- (South Africa) Jethren Barr - Drogheda United
- (South Africa) Harris Chueu – Derry City
- (South Africa) Owen Da Gama – Derry City
- (South Africa) Katlego Mashigo – Bohemians, Waterford, Athlone Town, Finn Harps
- (South Africa) Reyaad Pieterse – Shamrock Rovers
- (South Africa) Tumelo Tlou – Longford Town, Athlone Town
- (South Africa) Carlton Ubaezuonu – Dundalk, Galway United, Longford Town, Athlone Town

=== Togo ===
- (Togo) Moise Assogba – Galway United
- (Togo) Cyril Guedjé – St Patrick's Athletic, Limerick

=== Tunisia ===
- (Tunisia) Ayman Ben Mohamed – UCD, Longford Town, Bohemians

=== Uganda ===
- (Uganda) Melvyn Lorenzen – Sligo Rovers
- (Uganda) Charles Livingstone Mbabazi – St Patrick's Athletic
- (Uganda) Carl Mujaguzi – Athlone Town, Kerry

=== Zaire ===
- (Zaire) José Mukendi – Derry City, Finn Harps

=== Zimbabwe ===
- (Zimbabwe) Nathaniel Gumbo – Cobh Ramblers
- (Zimbabwe) Shane Maroodza – Kerry
- (Zimbabwe) Henry McKop – Shelbourne
- (Zimbabwe) Prince Mutswunguma – Waterford
- (Zimbabwe) Oscar Sibanda – Galway United

== Asia (AFC) ==
=== Australia ===
- (Australia) Tomislav Arčaba – Sligo Rovers
- (Australia) Harry Ascroft – Finn Harps
- (Australia) Con Blatsis – St Patrick's Athletic
- (Australia) Dimitri Brinias – Galway United
- (Australia) Sean Eve – Wexford
- (Australia) Joseph Forde – Waterford
- (Australia) **Steven Havales** – Bray Wanderers
- (Australia) Adam Hughes – Sligo Rovers, Drogheda United
- (Australia) Brad Jones – Shelbourne
- (Australia) Robert Markovac – Waterford United
- (Australia) Liam McGing – Finn Harps
- (Australia) James Meredith – Sligo Rovers
- (Australia) Dylan Mernagh – Waterford United
- (Australia) Chris O'Connor – Bray Wanderers, Bohemians
- (Australia) Andrew Packer – Cork City
- (Australia) Andy Petterson – Derry City
- (Australia) Stevan Stanic-Floody – Drogheda United, Kerry
- (Australia) Daniel Stynes – Galway United
- (Australia) John Tambouras – Drogheda United

=== Guam ===
- (Guam) Ryan Guy – St Patrick's Athletic

=== Hong Kong ===
- (Hong Kong) John Moore – St Patrick's Athletic
- (Hong Kong) David Williamson – Sligo Rovers, Bohemians, Bray Wanderers

=== Iraq ===
- (Iraq) Zein Albehadlie – Bohemians

=== Japan ===
- (Japan) Kaito Akimoto – Cabinteely
- (Japan) Ryusei Kojima – Cabinteely
- (Japan) Yuta Sasaki – Cabinteely
- (Japan) Hisanori Takada – Drogheda United

=== Jordan ===
- (Jordan) Jaime Siaj – Finn Harps

=== South Korea ===
- (South Korea) Jeongwoo Han – Dundalk
- (South Korea) Jingu Kim – Galway United
- (South Korea) Yob Son – Galway United
- (South Korea) Lee-Cheol Sung – Athlone Town

=== Sri Lanka ===
- (Sri Lanka) Sam Durrant – Dundalk

=== Timor Leste ===
- (Timor-Leste) Claudio Osorio – Cobh Ramblers

== Europe (UEFA) ==
=== Albania ===
- (Albania) Alessio Abibi – Dundalk
- (Albania) Leo Gaxha – Kerry, Galway United, Athlone Town, Dundalk
- (Albania) Alban Hysa – Monaghan United, Dublin City
- (Albania) Marlon Marishta – Bohemians, Bray Wanderers

=== Austria ===
- (Austria) Tobias Kainz – Limerick
- (Austria) Maximilian Karner – Derry City
- (Austria) Alexander Kogler – Finn Harps
- (Austria) Lukas Schubert – Derry City
- (Austria) **Marco Untergrabner** – Shelbourne
- (Austria) Orhan Vojic - Shamrock Rovers

=== Belgium ===
- (Belgium) Axel Bossekota – Limerick
- (Belgium) Stanley Aborah – Waterford
- (Belgium) Faysel Kasmi – Waterford
- (Belgium) Danny Lupano– Derry City
- (Belgium) Tunde Owolabi – Finn Harps, St Patrick's Athletic, Cork City
- (Belgium) Dominique Wouters – Waterford United, St Patrick's Athletic

=== Bosnia and Herzegovina ===
- (Bosnia and Herzegovina) Fahrudin Kuduzović – Sligo Rovers, Drogheda United, Cork City, Dundalk
- (Bosnia and Herzegovina) Admir Softić – Cork City

=== Bulgaria ===
- (Bulgaria) Yani Georgiev – Bray Wanderers
- (Bulgaria) Vladislav Velikin – Athlone Town

=== Croatia ===
- (Croatia) David Bošnjak – Cobh Ramblers
- (Croatia) Filip Mihaljević – Finn Harps
- (Croatia) Antonio Tuta – Finn Harps, Kerry
- (Croatia) Trpimir Vrljičak – Kerry, Treaty United

=== Czech Republic ===
- (Czech Republic) Vítězslav Jaroš – St Patrick's Athletic
- (Czech Republic) Michal Macek – St Patrick's Athletic
- (Czech Republic) Vojtech Ptacek – Treaty United

=== Denmark ===
- (Denmark) Morten Nielsen – Sligo Rovers
- (Denmark) Jesper Jørgensen – Galway United
- (Denmark) Jonas Piechnik – Cork City
- (Denmark) Niclas Vemmelund – Derry City, Dundalk

=== England ===
- (England) Chris Adamson – St Patrick's Athletic
- (England) Tobi Adebayo-Rowling – Sligo Rovers, Cork City
- (England) **Jordan Adeyemi** – Cobh Ramblers
- (England) Jimmy Aggrey - Bohemians
- (England) Elicha Ahui – Drogheda United
- (England) James Akintunde – Derry City, Bohemians
- (England) Dipo Akinyemi – Derry City
- (England) Sam Allardyce – Limerick
- (England) Nigel Aris – Waterford
- (England) Chris Armstrong – St Patrick's Athletic, Galway United
- (England) Finlay Armstrong – Waterford
- (England) Maleace Asamoah – Waterford, Shamrock Rovers
- (England) Joe Ashton – Waterford
- (England) David Aziaya – Finn Harps
- (England) Drew Baker – Bohemians, Waterford
- (England) Gordon Banks – St Patrick's Athletic
- (England) Lewis Banks – Sligo Rovers
- (England) Alex Baptiste – Waterford
- (England) Keith Barker – St Patrick's Athletic
- (England) Peter Barnes – Drogheda United
- (England) Shane Barrett – Drogheda United, Sporting Fingal, Cork City, Monaghan United
- (England) Alfie Bates – Drogheda United
- (England) Guy Bates – Drogheda United
- (England) Jack Baxter – Cork City
- (England) Ashley Bayes – Bohemians
- (England) Darren Beasley – Drogheda United
- (England) Paul Beavers – Shelbourne
- (England) Mitchell Beeney – Sligo Rovers
- (England) Sam Bellis – Waterford, Cobh Ramblers
- (England) Jay Benn – Bohemians
- (England) Dean Bennett – Dundalk
- (England) Neil Bennett – Drogheda United, Derry City
- (England) Kian Best – Bohemians
- (England) Richard Blackmore – Dundalk, Galway United
- (England) Matthew Blinkhorn – Sligo Rovers
- (England) Sam Bone – Shamrock Rovers, Waterford, St Patrick's Athletic, Dundalk, Shelbourne
- (England) Rob Bowman – Bohemians
- (England) Zak Bradshaw – Dundalk
- (England) Leon Braithwaite – St Patrick's Athletic
- (England) AJ Bridge – Cork City
- (England) Barry Bridges – St Patrick's Athletic, Sligo Rovers
- (England) Louis Britton – Waterford, Cork City
- (England) Harry Brockbank – St Patrick's Athletic
- (England) Trevor Brooking – Cork City
- (England) **Niall Brookwell** – Cork City, Kerry
- (England) Richard Brush – Sligo Rovers, Shamrock Rovers, Finn Harps
- (England) Jack Burkett – St Patrick's Athletic
- (England) Dennis Burnett – Shamrock Rovers
- (England) Charlie Burns – Galway United
- (England) Ian Butterworth – Cobh Ramblers
- (England) Ollie Byrne – Cork City
- (England) Ian Callaghan – Cork United
- (England) Shea Callister – Derry City
- (England) **Hayden Cann** – Drogheda United, Dundalk, Derry City, Waterford
- (England) Greg Challender – Finn Harps
- (England) **Ellis Chapman** – Sligo Rovers, Shelbourne, Derry City
- (England) Bobby Charlton – Waterford
- (England) Mark Chidi – Bray Wanderers
- (England) Kieran Coates – Cork City
- (England) John Cofie – Derry City
- (England) George Cooper – Drogheda United
- (England) Tom Costello – Galway United
- (England) Gerry Coyne – Limerick, Cork Hibernians
- (England) Cameron Cresswell – Waterford
- (England) Harvey Cribb – Cobh Ramblers
- (England) Craig Curran – Limerick
- (England) Blain Curtis – Finn Harps
- (England) Deshane Dalling – Cork City
- (England) Luke Danville – Dundalk
- (England) Archie Davies – Dundalk
- (England) Dixie Dean – Sligo Rovers
- (England) Adam Dempsey – Wexford, Bray Wanderers
- (England) Paul Dempsey – UCD
- (England) **Sadou Diallo** – Derry City, Bohemians
- (England) John Dillon – Sligo Rovers, Dundalk
- (England) Reyon Dillon – Cork City
- (England) Kieran Djilali – Sligo Rovers, Limerick, Cork City
- (England) Alan Dodd – Cork City
- (England) Sean Doherty – Sligo Rovers
- (England) Tom Donaghy – Waterford
- (England) Mark Doninger – Sligo Rovers
- (England) Aidan Dowling – Cork City
- (England) Gareth Downey – Finn Harps, Shelbourne, Monaghan United
- (England) Glen Downey – Shelbourne
- (England) Jack Doyle – Derry City
- (England) Freddie Draper – Drogheda United
- (England) Eddie Dsane – Longford Town, Finn Harps
- (England) Dylan Duncan – Finn Harps
- (England) Robert Dunne – Cabinteely
- (England) **Ryan Edmondson** – St Patrick's Athletic
- (England) Anthony Elding – Sligo Rovers, Cork City, Derry City
- (England) Lee Ellington – Finn Harps
- (England) Kit Elliott – Cork City
- (England) Andy Estel – Home Farm, Drogheda United
- (England) Jake Evans – Chippenham Town
- (England) Theo Farquharson – Kerry
- (England) Ellis Farrar – Finn Harps
- (England) Bobby Faulkner – Dundalk
- (England) Scott Fenwick – Cork City
- (England) Walter Figueira – Waterford, Derry City, Sligo Rovers
- (England) Harry Fisk – Shelbourne
- (England) Neil Fitzhenry – Finn Harps
- (England) **Brandon Fleming** – Derry City
- (England) Alan Fletcher – Sligo Rovers
- (England) **Jordan Flores** – Dundalk, Bohemians
- (England) George Forrest – Waterford
- (England) Martin Garratt – St Patrick's Athletic
- (England) Brendan Gallen – Sligo Rovers, Drogheda United
- (England) Steven Gaughan – Cork City
- (England) Jordan Gibson – St Patrick's Athletic, Sligo Rovers
- (England) Kerrea Gilbert – Shamrock Rovers
- (England) Matty Gillam – Cork City
- (England) Matthew Gledhill – Sligo Rovers, Cork City
- (England) Felix Goddard – Dundalk
- (England) Jaanai Gordon – Sligo Rovers
- (England) Matt Gregg – Bray Wanderers, Bohemians, UCD, Dundalk
- (England) **Tom Grivosti** – St Patrick's Athletic, Dundalk
- (England) Greg Halford – Waterford
- (England) Adam Hammill – Derry City
- (England) Ray Hankin – Shamrock Rovers
- (England) Alf Hanson – Shelbourne
- (England) Aaron Harper-Bailey – Drogheda United
- (England) Allan Harris – St Patrick's Athletic
- (England) Jimmy Harris – St Patrick's Athletic
- (England) Bob Hatton – Dundalk
- (England) Wayne Hatswell – Dundalk
- (England) Omar Haughton – Sligo Rovers
- (England) George Heaven – Cork City
- (England) Max Hemmings – Galway United
- (England) Jeff Henderson – Sligo Rovers
- (England) James Henshall – Shelbourne
- (England) Jak Hickman – St Patrick's Athletic
- (England) Michael Holt – St Patrick's Athletic, Derry City, Dublin City
- (England) Louie Holzman – Bohemians
- (England) Tony Hopper – Bohemians
- (England) Grant Horton – Bohemians, Waterford
- (England) Michael Howard – Cork City
- (England) Jamie Hughes – Derry City
- (England) Jackson Hulme – Athlone Town
- (England) Paul Hunt – St Patrick's Athletic, Longford Town, Cobh Ramblers, Cork City, Wexford
- (England) Kevin Hunt - Bohemians
- (England) Geoff Hurst – Cork Celtic
- (England) Max Hutchison – Waterford, Finn Harps
- (England) Reece Hutchinson – Sligo Rovers
- (England) Christian Hyslop – Waterford United
- (England) Zeno Ibsen Rossi – Shelbourne
- (England) Duncan Idehen – Derry City
- (England) Benny Igiehon – Sligo Rovers, Finn Harps
- (England) **Douglas James-Taylor** – Drogheda United, Bohemians
- (England) **Will Jarvis** – Shelbourne
- (England) Pat Jennings Jr. – UCD, Derry City, Sligo Rovers, Shamrock Rovers, Athlone Town, St Patrick's Athletic
- (England) Will Johnson – Waterford
- (England) Zak Johnson – Dundalk
- (England) Daniel Jones – Bray Wanderers, Longford Town
- (England) Jimmi-Lee Jones – St Patrick's Athletic
- (England) Louis Jones – Waterford
- (England) Kaedyn Kamara – Cork City
- (England) **Al-Amin Kazeem** – Galway United, St Patrick's Athletic
- (England) Tony Kelly – Sligo Rovers
- (England) Alex Lacey – Bohemians
- (England) Trevor Lee – St Patrick's Athletic
- (England) Brenton Leister – St Patrick's Athletic
- (England) Alfie Lewis – St Patrick's Athletic, Dundalk
- (England) Andrew Lewis – Bray Wanderers
- (England) Adam Liddle – Derry City
- (England) Harvey Lintott – Sligo Rovers
- (England) Will Longbottom – Waterford
- (England) Charlie Lutz – Cork City
- (England) Jason Lydiate – Finn Harps
- (England) Dean Lyness – St Patrick's Athletic
- (England) Harvey Macadam – Waterford
- (England) Niall Maher – Longford Town
- (England) Matty Makinson – Finn Harps
- (England) **Connor Malley** – Dundalk, Sligo Rovers, Shamrock Rovers
- (England) Darren Mansaram – Sligo Rovers, Bohemians, Dundalk
- (England) Paul Marney – St Patrick's Athletic, Dundalk
- (England) James Marrow – Finn Harps
- (England) Adam Martin – Bohemians
- (England) Jamie Mascoll – Waterford
- (England) Luke Matheson – Bohemians
- (England) **Noah Mawene** – Waterford
- (England) **Connor McCarthy** – Mayo
- (England) Terry McDermott – Cork City
- (England) Rowan McDonald – Waterford
- (England) Michael McGinlay – Bohemians, Dundalk
- (England) Michael McGrath – Galway United, Sligo Rovers
- (England) Cameron McJannet – Derry City
- (England) Jeremie Milambo – Waterford
- (England) Josh Miles – Waterford
- (England) Tom Miller – Dundalk
- (England) Lee Molyneaux – Derry City
- (England) Andy Moran – Derry City
- (England) Adam Morgan – Sligo Rovers
- (England) Scott Morgan – Galway United
- (England) Tom Morris – Longford Town
- (England) Dave Morrison – Bohemians
- (England) Hayden Muller – Dundalk
- (England) Peter Mumby – Shamrock Rovers, Limerick
- (England) Danny Murphy – Cork City, Shamrock Rovers
- (England) John Murphy – St Patrick's Athletic
- (England) Dan Murray – Cork City, Shamrock Rovers
- (England) Jordan Mustoe – Finn Harps
- (England) **Zane Myers** – Bohemians
- (England) Jennison Myrie-Williams – Sligo Rovers
- (England) Liam Nash – Cork City
- (England) Kitt Nelson – Cork City
- (England) Alex Nesovic – Finn Harps, Bohemians, Dundalk, Shelbourne, Derry City, Dublin City
- (England) Tom Norcott – Derry City
- (England) **James Norris** – Shelbourne
- (England) Danny North – St Patrick's Athletic, Sligo Rovers, Shamrock Rovers
- (England) Colum Nugent – Waterford
- (England) Scott Oakes – Shelbourne
- (England) Eric Odhiambo – Sligo Rovers
- (England) Akin Odimayo – Waterford
- (England) William Oduwa – Finn Harps
- (England) Junior Ogedi-Uzokwe – Derry City, Sligo Rovers, Dundalk, Bohemians, Galway United
- (England) Neil Ogden – Sligo Rovers, Shelbourne, Galway United
- (England) Sam Oji – Limerick, Galway United
- (England) **James Olayinka** – Waterford, Derry City
- (England) Carlton Palmer – Dublin City
- (England) **Romal Palmer** – St Patrick's Athletic
- (England) Arthur Parker – Galway United
- (England) Stuart Parker – Drogheda United
- (England) **Connor Parsons** – Waterford, Bohemians
- (England) Will Patching – Dundalk, Derry City
- (England) Christie Pattisson – Waterford
- (England) Greg Peel – Waterford
- (England) Sam Perry – Waterford
- (England) Arran Pettifer – St Patrick's Athletic
- (England) Evan Pierce – Athlone Town
- (England) **Axel Piesold** – Galway United
- (England) Dan Pike – Dundalk
- (England) Derek Possee – St Patrick's Athletic
- (England) Vill Powell – Derry City
- (England) **Seb Quirk** – Sligo Rovers
- (England) Sam Ramsbottom – Galway United
- (England) Mark Rees – Shamrock Rovers
- (England) Nicky Reid – Sligo Rovers
- (England) Jordan Richards – Sligo Rovers
- (England) Rohan Ricketts – Shamrock Rovers
- (England) Liam Roberts – Waterford
- (England) Sean Robertson – Derry City, Shamrock Rovers
- (England) Daryl Robson – Galway United, Bray Wanderers
- (England) Craig Roddan – Sligo Rovers
- (England) Dave Rogers – Shelbourne, Derry City, St Patrick's Athletic, Sporting Fingal, Dundalk, Cork City, Limerick, Monaghan United, Drogheda United, Bohemians
- (England) Bradley Rolt – Bohemians
- (England) Richard Rose – Longford Town
- (England) Jordan Rossiter – Waterford
- (England) Adam Rundle – Dublin City, Cork City
- (England) Mark Rutherford – Shelbourne, Bohemians, Shamrock Rovers, St Patrick's Athletic, Longford Town
- (England) Alex Rutter – Galway United
- (England) Henry Rylah – Derry City
- (England) Darragh Ryan – UCD, Cork City, St Patrick's Athletic
- (England) Bill Sampy – Waterford
- (England) Lawrie Sanchez – Sligo Rovers
- (England) **Sam Sargeant** – Waterford, Sligo Rovers, Bohemians
- (England) Cameron Saul – Finn Harps
- (England) Danny Seaborne – Derry City
- (England) Jack Serrant-Green – Finn Harps
- (England) George Shelvey – Dundalk
- (England) Peter Shevlin – Shelbourne
- (England) Rio Shipston – Cork City
- (England) Jack Shorrock – Sligo Rovers
- (England) Aaron Simpson – Waterford
- (England) Connor Simpson – Cork City
- (England) Harpal Singh – Sligo Rovers, Bohemians, Dundalk
- (England) Jeremy Sivi – Galway United
- (England) Mike Skivington – Dundalk
- (England) Dan Smith – Cork City
- (England) David Smith – Drogheda United
- (England) Tom Smith – Waterford
- (England) **Tyler Smith** – Derry City
- (England) Danny Spiller – Longford Town
- (England) Kyron Stabana – Cork City
- (England) Jack Stafford – Waterford
- (England) Matty Stevens – Sligo Rovers
- (England) Daniel Stokoe – Finn Harps
- (England) **Jamie Stott** – Derry City
- (England) Fynn Talley – Drogheda United
- (England) Bobby Tambling – Cork Celtic, Waterford, Shamrock Rovers, Cork Alberts
- (England) Alfie Taylor – St Patrick's Athletic
- (England) Richard Taylor – Waterford
- (England) Remi Thompson – Waterford
- (England) James Tilley – Cork City
- (England) Rayhaan Tulloch – Dundalk, Shelbourne
- (England) Mike Turner – Finn Harps
- (England) Scott Twine – Waterford
- (England) Rohan Vaughan – Dundalk
- (England) Terry Venables – St Patrick's Athletic
- (England) Danny Ventre – Sligo Rovers, Derry City
- (England) Bradley Wade Cork City, Waterford
- (England) Mickey Walker – Sligo Rovers
- (England) Ray Wallace – Drogheda United
- (England) Sid Wallace – Waterford
- (England) Dan Ward – St Patrick's Athletic
- (England) Niall Watson – Sligo Rovers
- (England) Vinny Whelan – Shelbourne
- (England) Kyle White – Waterford
- (England) Charlie Wiggett – Sligo Rovers
- (England) Lee Williams – Shamrock Rovers
- (England) Robbie Williams – Limerick, Cork City, Galway United
- (England) **Wasiri Williams** – Dundalk, Galway United
- (England) Conor Winn – Mervue United, Galway United, Shamrock Rovers, Dundalk, Finn Harps, Treaty United
- (England) Andre Wisdom – Derry City
- (England) Tony Witter – Bohemians
- (England) **Matty Wolfe** – Sligo Rovers, Galway United
- (England) Harry Wood – Shelbourne
- (England) Kaiyne Woolery – Sligo Rovers
- (England) Anthony Wordsworth – Waterford
- (England) Ben Worman – Cork City
- (England) Andre Wright – Bohemians, Sligo Rovers
- (England) Joe Wright – Galway United
- (England) Luke Young – Sligo Rovers
- (England) Ollie Younger – St Patrick's Athletic

=== Estonia ===
- (Estonia) Vladislav Kreida – St Patrick's Athletic
- (Estonia) Frank Liivak – Sligo Rovers
- (Estonia) Michael Lilander – Bohemians
- (Estonia) Martin Miller – Bohemians
- (Estonia) Markus Poom – Shamrock Rovers
- (Estonia) Sander Puri – Sligo Rovers, Waterford
- (Estonia) Sten Reinkort – Bohemians
- (Estonia) Bogdan Vaštšuk – Sligo Rovers

=== Faroe Islands ===
- (Faroe Islands) Sonni Nattestad – Dundalk
- (Faroe Islands) Stefan Radosavljevic – Sligo Rovers

=== Finland ===
- (Finland) Serge Atakayi – St Patrick's Athletic, Waterford
- (Finland) **Jonas Häkkinen** – Cork City, Cobh Ramblers, Kerry
- (Finland) Eemeli Honkola – Kerry
- (Finland) Hugo Keto – Waterford
- (Finland) **Anthony Olusanya** – St Patrick's Athletic
- (Finland) Lasse Peltonen – UCD
- (Finland) Teemu Penninkangas – Sligo Rovers
- (Finland) Sami Ristilä – Drogheda United
- (Finland) Tomi Saarelma – Galway United
- (Finland) Mikko Vilmunen – Drogheda United
- (Finland) Johannes Yli-Kokko – Dundalk

=== France ===
- (France) Maxime Blanchard – Shamrock Rovers
- (France) Achille Campion – Sligo Rovers, Cork City, St Patrick's Athletic
- (France) **Enzo Dietrich** – Cobh Ramblers
- (France) Damien Dupuy – UCD, Galway United
- (France) Vincent Escudé-Candau – Cork City
- (France) Alex Fanle – Finn Harps
- (France) Stephane Jauny – Dundalk, Home Farm
- (France) Ibrahim Keita – Finn Harps, Galway United
- (France) Néhémie Lamtoukou – Athlone Town
- (France) Osvaldo Lopes – Cork City
- (France) Nathan Lumingo – Finn Harps
- (France) **Milan Mbeng** – Cork City, Shelbourne
- (France) Laurent Merlin – St Patrick's Athletic
- (France) Lys Mousset – Bohemians
- (France) Etanda N'Kololo – Salthill Devon, Mervue United, Longford Town, Athlone Town
- (France) Élie N'Zeyi - Finn Harps
- (France) Yann M'Vita – Longford Town
- (France) Christophe Rodrigues Silva – Athlone Town
- (France) Gianni Seraf – Derry City
- (France) Wilfried Tagbo – Finn Harps
- (France) Isaac Tshipamba – Waterford
- (France) Pascal Vaudequin – Derry City, Shelbourne, Finn Harps, Bohemians, Shamrock Rovers
- (France) Mickaël Wolski – Shamrock Rovers

=== Georgia ===
- (Georgia (country)) **Lasha Baramidze** – St Francis
- (Georgia (country)) Nika Kalandarishvili – Athlone Town, Cabinteely
- (Georgia (country)) **Guga Kokaia** – Mayo
- (Georgia (country)) **Daviti Tsikarishvili** – Mayo

=== Germany ===
- (Germany) Eric Abulu – Shamrock Rovers, Longford Town
- (Germany) Laurenz Dehl – Bohemians
- (Germany) Fabrice Hartmann – Sligo Rovers
- (Germany) Tim Hiemer – Finn Harps, Kerry
- (Germany) Franz-Josef Hönig – Cork Celtic
- (Germany) Leon Pöhls – Shamrock Rovers
- (Germany) Sinisa Savic – Longford Town
- (Germany) Uwe Seeler – Cork Celtic
- (Germany) Leo Stritter – Dundalk

=== Gibraltar ===
- (Gibraltar) Louie Annesley – Dundalk

=== Hungary ===
- (Hungary) Krisztián Adorján – Dundalk
- (Hungary) Peter Berki – Limerick
- (Hungary) Róbert Kovácsevics – Drogheda United

=== Israel ===
- (Israel) Alon Netzer – Derry City

=== Italy ===
- (Italy) Temi Ajibola – Finn Harps
- (Italy) Alessandro De Sanctis – Cobh Ramblers
- (Italy) Luciano Masiello – Athlone Town
- (Italy) Christian Nanetti – Cork City
- (Italy) Vito Tamburro – Cabinteely
- (Italy) Brian Torre – Athlone Town

=== Latvia ===
- (Latvia) Gints Freimanis – St Patrick's Athletic
- (Latvia) Kirils Grigorovs – Athlone Town
- (Latvia) Raivis Jurkovskis – Dundalk
- (Latvia) Igors Labuts – Sporting Fingal, Athlone Town
- (Latvia) Roberts Mežeckis – Cork City
- (Latvia) Andrejs Perepļotkins – Bohemians
- (Latvia) Renārs Rode – Waterford
- (Latvia) Guntars Silagailis – Cork City
- (Latvia) **Markuss Strods** – Bohemians
- (Latvia) David Titov – St Patrick's Athletic

=== Liechtenstein ===
- (Liechtenstein) Simon Lüchinger – Kerry

=== Lithuania ===
- (Lithuania) Arminas Balevicius – Waterford United
- (Lithuania) Karolis Chvedukas – Dundalk, Waterford
- (Lithuania) **David Gavriliak** – Salthill Devon
- (Lithuania) Mindaugas Kalonas – Bohemians
- (Lithuania) Vilius Labutis – Cabinteely, Bray Wanderers
- (Lithuania) **Edvinas Jakas** – Bray Wanderers, Longford Town
- (Lithuania) **Rokas Katkauskas** – Athlone Town
- (Lithuania) Danielus Niekis – Wexford Youths
- (Lithuania) Sigitas Olberkis – Sligo Rovers
- (Lithuania) Rimvydas Sadauskas – Cork City
- (Lithuania) Rokas Stanulevičius – Cork City
- (Lithuania) Nazar Zubkov – Athlone Town

=== Luxembourg ===
- (Luxembourg) **Timothy Martin** – Cobh Ramblers

=== Malta ===
- (Malta) Jacob Borg – Finn Harps
- (Malta) Luke Dimech – Shamrock Rovers
- (Malta) Kyrian Nwoko – St Patrick's Athletic

=== Moldova ===
- (Moldova) Dragos Mamaliga – Bray Wanderers
- (Moldova) Stephan Negru – Shelbourne
- (Moldova) Eugen Slivca – Athlone Town

=== Netherlands ===
- (Netherlands) Jordi Balk – St Patrick's Athletic
- (Netherlands) Malik Dijksteel – Cork City
- (Netherlands) Elden de Getrouwe – Dundalk
- (Netherlands) Youri Habing – Athlone Town
- (Netherlands) Noah Lewis – St Patrick's Athletic
- (Netherlands) Barry Maguire – Limerick
- (Netherlands) **Hans Mpongo** – Finn Harps, Cork City
- (Netherlands) Quincy Nkansah – Athlone Town
- (Netherlands) Koen Oostenbrink – Dundalk
- (Netherlands) Maarten Pouwels – Waterford
- (Netherlands) John Powell – Shelbourne, Drogheda United
- (Netherlands) Jermaine Sandvliet – Drogheda United
- (Netherlands) Rein Smit – Sligo Rovers
- (Netherlands) Wessel Speel – Shelbourne
- (Netherlands) Thijs Timmermans – St Patrick's Athletic
- (Netherlands) Tein Troost – Cork City
- (Netherlands) **Nick Twisk** – Derry City
- (Netherlands) Eddie van Boxtel – Dundalk, Galway United, Drogheda United, Monaghan United, Bray Wanderers
- (Netherlands) Carel van der Velden – Shelbourne, Sligo Rovers
- (Netherlands) Noah van Geenen – Athlone Town
- (Netherlands) Michael Zaalman – Sligo Rovers

=== North Macedonia ===
- (North Macedonia) Daniel Krezic – Cork City

=== Norway ===
- (Norway) Stanley Anaebonam – Shelbourne
- (Norway) Runar Hauge - Dundalk
- (Norway) Glen Atle Larsen – St Patrick's Athletic
- (Norway) Ole Erik Midtskogen – Dundalk
- (Norway) Tim Nilsen – Derry City
- (Norway) **Jonas Stjernberg** – Cobh Ramblers
- (Norway) **Jørgen Voilås** – Waterford

=== Poland ===
- (Poland) Piotr Bajdziak – Sligo Rovers
- (Poland) Jarosław Białek – St Patrick's Athletic
- (Poland) Kacper Chorążka – Bohemians
- (Poland) Nikodem Kozlowski – Treaty United
- (Poland) Piotr Krzanowski – Cork City
- (Poland) Bartłomiej Kukułowicz – Bohemians
- (Poland) Krystian Lamberski – Waterford
- (Poland) Arek Mamala – Galway United
- (Poland) Krystian Nowak – Bohemians
- (Poland) Filip Piszczek – Bohemians
- (Poland) Kacper Radkowski – Bohemians, Waterford
- (Poland) Michal Sadys – Cobh Ramblers
- (Poland) Łukasz Skowron – St Patrick's Athletic
- (Poland) Kacper Skwierczyński – Waterford
- (Poland) Piotr Suski – Waterford
- (Poland) Marcin Szymański – Galway United
- (Poland) **Kacper Zatonski** – Mervue United
- (Poland) Alan Zborowski – Waterford, Cobh Ramblers

=== Portugal ===
- (Portugal) Mauro Almeida – Sligo Rovers
- (Portugal) Euclides Cabral – Shelbourne
- (Portugal) Rúben Candal – Athlone Town
- (Portugal) **Benny Couto** – Cork City, Waterford
- (Portugal) **Hugo Cunha** – Galway United
- (Portugal) Daniel de Lacerda – Finn Harps
- (Portugal) **Kévin dos Santos** – Derry City
- (Portugal) **Rodrigo Freitas** – Shelbourne
- (Portugal) Dery Hernandez – Athlone Town
- (Portugal) Matthew Leal – Athlone Town
- (Portugal) Pedro Martelo – Sligo Rovers
- (Portugal) **Bernardo Monteiro** – Finn Harps
- (Portugal) Adalberto Pinto – Shelbourne
- (Portugal) Carlos Rocha – Kilkenny City
- (Portugal) José Viegas – Athlone Town
- (Portugal) Nelson Vieira – Sligo Rovers

=== Romania ===
- (Romania) Victor Collins – Salthill Devon, Galway United
- (Romania) Andrei Georgescu – Bray Wanderers, Shelbourne, Athlone Town, Drogheda United
- (Romania) Marco Chindea – St Patrick's Athletic, Waterford, Athlone Town, Bohemians
- (Romania) Cristian Măgerușan – Bohemians, Longford Town, Bray Wanderers
- (Romania) Bogdan Oprea – UCD
- (Romania) Gabriel Sava – Bray Wanderers, Drohgheda United, Monaghan United, Dundalk
- (Romania) Dragoș Sfrijan – Athlone Town

=== Scotland ===
- (Scotland) **Josh Adam** – Bohemians
- (Scotland) Jordan Allan – Derry City
- (Scotland) Scott Allardice – Bohemians, Waterford
- (Scotland) **Vincent Angelini** – Galway United
- (Scotland) Alex Bannon – Derry City
- (Scotland) Chris Bennion – Shelbourne, Dundalk, Athlone Town, St Patrick's Athletic, Monaghan United, Longford Town
- (Scotland) Steven Bradley – Dundalk
- (Scotland) Darren Brownlie – Dundalk
- (Scotland) Liam Buchanan – Sligo Rovers
- (Scotland) Francis Burns – Shamrock Rovers
- (Scotland) Liam Burt – Bohemians, Shamrock Rovers, Shelbourne
- (Scotland) Tommy Callaghan – Galway Rovers
- (Scotland) Colin Cameron – Sligo Rovers
- (Scotland) Greg Cameron – Shamrock Rovers
- (Scotland) Chic Charnley – Cork City
- (Scotland) Peter Cherrie – Dundalk, Bray Wanderers, Cork City, Derry City
- (Scotland) Ross Chisholm – Shamrock Rovers
- (Scotland) Darren Cole – Derry City
- (Scotland) James Coll – Athlone Town, St Patrick's Athletic, Limerick, Dundalk, Bohemians, Monaghan United
- (Scotland) John Colrain – St Patrick's Athletic
- (Scotland) Alex Cooper – Sligo Rovers
- (Scotland) **Ali Coote** – Waterford, Bohemians, Shelbourne
- (Scotland) James Creaney – Dundalk, Galway United
- (Scotland) Dixie Deans – Shelbourne
- (Scotland) Jimmy Delaney – Derry City
- (Scotland) Kevin Docherty – Finn Harps
- (Scotland) Cameron Elliott – Dundalk
- (Scotland) Kyle Ferguson – Waterford
- (Scotland) **Ronan Ferns** – Finn Harps
- (Scotland) Billy Findlay – Sligo Rovers
- (Scotland) Kieran Freeman – St Patrick's Athletic
- (Scotland) Adam Frizzell – Derry City
- (Scotland) Danny Galbraith – Limerick
- (Scotland) Stuart Gauld – St Patrick's Athletic, Derry City, Finn Harps
- (Scotland) Billy Gibson – St Patrick's Athletic
- (Scotland) John Gibson – Sligo Rovers
- (Scotland) Ally Gilchrist – Shamrock Rovers, Derry City, Shelbourne, Cork City
- (Scotland) Grant Gillespie – Derry City
- (Scotland) Ian Gilzean – Sligo Rovers, Drogheda United, St Patrick's Athletic, Shelbourne
- (Scotland) **Rhys Gourdie** – Cobh Ramblers
- (Scotland) Declan Glass – Derry City
- (Scotland) Dale Gray – Sligo Rovers
- (Scotland) Stewart Greacen – Derry City
- (Scotland) Martin Gritton – Shelbourne
- (Scotland) Jamie Gullan – Dundalk
- (Scotland) Alex Hair – Shelbourne
- (Scotland) David Herd – Waterford
- (Scotland) Scott High – Dundalk
- (Scotland) Kevin Holt – Derry City
- (Scotland) David Hopkirk – Derry City
- (Scotland) Jordan Houston – Waterford
- (Scotland) Murray Johnson – Shelbourne
- (Scotland) Jimmy Johnstone – Shelbourne
- (Scotland) Robert Jones – Finn Harps
- (Scotland) Jack Keay – Derry City
- (Scotland) Josh Kerr – Derry City, Bohemians
- (Scotland) Billy King – St Patrick's Athletic
- (Scotland) Cameron King – Shamrock Rovers
- (Scotland) Paul Kinnaird – Derry City
- (Scotland) Mike Korotkich – St Patrick's Athletic
- (Scotland) Jim Lauchlan – Sligo Rovers
- (Scotland) Steven Lennon – Dundalk
- (Scotland) Sam Long – Drogheda United
- (Scotland) Peter Lorimer – UCD
- (Scotland) Nicky Low – Derry City
- (Scotland) Lewis Macari – Dundalk
- (Scotland) Stephen Manson – Sligo Rovers
- (Scotland) Neil Martin – St Patrick's Athletic
- (Scotland) Alex Massie – Dolphin
- (Scotland) John Paul McBride – Derry City
- (Scotland) Rhys McCabe – Sligo Rovers, St Patrick's Athletic
- (Scotland) Vinny McCarthy – Waterford, Shamrock Rovers, Cobh Ramblers
- (Scotland) Allan McClory – Brideville
- (Scotland) Pat McCluskey – Sligo Rovers
- (Scotland) John McCole – Shelbourne, Cork Hibernians, Dundalk
- (Scotland) Jon McCracken – Bohemians
- (Scotland) Marc McCulloch – Shelbourne, Galway United
- (Scotland) **Declan McDaid** – Bohemians, Athlone Town, Dundalk
- (Scotland) Patrick McDonagh – Sligo Rovers
- (Scotland) Kevin McDonald – Drogheda United
- (Scotland) John McFarlane – Shelbourne
- (Scotland) Scott McGarvey – Derry City
- (Scotland) Scott McGill – Dundalk
- (Scotland) Tommy McGrain – Galway Rovers, Sligo Rovers
- (Scotland) Jon-Paul McGovern – Derry City
- (Scotland) Thomas McGunnigle – Cork
- (Scotland) Kevin McHattie – Derry City
- (Scotland) Jim McInally – Sligo Rovers
- (Scotland) **Kerr McInroy** – Shelbourne
- (Scotland) Joe McKee – Dundalk
- (Scotland) Blair McKenzie – Waterford
- (Scotland) Jamie McKenzie – Sligo Rovers, Galway United
- (Scotland) Johnny MacKenzie – Derry City
- (Scotland) Kevin McKinlay – Dundalk
- (Scotland) Brian McLaughlin – Finn Harps
- (Scotland) Paul McLaughlin – Derry City
- (Scotland) Archie McLeod – Derry City
- (Scotland) Gerry McLoughlin – Waterford United
- (Scotland) Tam McManus – Derry City, Limerick
- (Scotland) Paul McMullan – Derry City
- (Scotland) Neil McNab – Derry City
- (Scotland) Marc McNulty – Shamrock Rovers
- (Scotland) Gary McPhee – St Patrick's Athletic
- (Scotland) Chris McQueen – Kerry
- (Scotland) Willie McStay – Sligo Rovers
- (Scotland) **Archie Meekison** – Bohemians, Sligo Rovers, Cork City
- (Scotland) Harry Monaghan – Derry City
- (Scotland) Jordan Moore – Limerick
- (Scotland) Lewis Morrison – Sligo Rovers
- (Scotland) **Danny Mullen** – Derry City, Dundalk
- (Scotland) Ross Munro – Dundalk
- (Scotland) Harry Nicolson – Finn Harps
- (Scotland) Josh O'Connor – Dundalk
- (Scotland) Keigan Parker – Cork City
- (Scotland) Jim Paterson – Shamrock Rovers
- (Scotland) Phoenix Patterson – Waterford
- (Scotland) Martin Rennie – St Patrick's Athletic
- (Scotland) Paul Ritchie – Derry City
- (Scotland) Mark Roberts – Shelbourne
- (Scotland) Paul Rudden – Waterford
- (Scotland) Mark Russell – Finn Harps, Galway United
- (Scotland) Ryan Shanley – Finn Harps
- (Scotland) Craig Sives – Shamrock Rovers
- (Scotland) Mike Skivington – Dundalk
- (Scotland) Cammy Smith – Dundalk
- (Scotland) Gordon Smith – Drumcondra
- (Scotland) Matty Smith – Waterford, St Patrick's Athletic, Derry City, Shelbourne
- (Scotland) Aaron Splaine – Derry City
- (Scotland) Sam Stanton – Dundalk
- (Scotland) Mark Stewart – Derry City
- (Scotland) Jered Stirling – Waterford United
- (Scotland) Bruce Strachan – Finn Harps
- (Scotland) Jack Stretton – Drogheda United
- (Scotland) Stuart Taylor – Drogheda United
- (Scotland) Dom Thomas – Derry City
- (Scotland) Joe Thomson – Derry City
- (Scotland) Jonathan Tiffoney – Limerick
- (Scotland) Gary Twigg – Shamrock Rovers
- (Scotland) Jamie Walker – Dundalk
- (Scotland) Rab Walls – Waterford
- (Scotland) Tom Walsh – Limerick
- (Scotland) Calum Waters – Sligo Rovers
- (Scotland) Jamie Watson – Finn Harps
- (Scotland) Tony Weldon – Dundalk
- (Scotland) Alex Williams – Dundalk, St Patrick's Athletic
- (Scotland) Cameron Yates – Dundalk

=== Serbia ===
- (Serbia) Stefan Čolović – Dundalk

=== Slovakia ===
- (Slovakia) Jozef Dolný – Derry City
- (Slovakia) Róbert Klučiar – Limerick

=== Slovenia ===
- (Slovenia) Uros Hojan – Cork City

=== Spain ===
- (Spain) Alvarito – Shelbourne
- (Spain) Guillermo Amirall – Bray Wanderers
- (Spain) Félix Bape – Athlone Town
- (Spain) Javier Barba – Galway United
- (Spain) Alberto Cabanyes – Galway United
- (Spain) José Carrillo - Finn Harps
- (Spain) Cristian Castells – Derry City
- (Spain) José García – Galway United
- (Spain) Manu Dimas – Galway United
- (Spain) Yael Haro – Drogheda United, UCD
- (Spain) Derik Osede – Waterford
- (Spain) Diego Portilla – Galway United
- (Spain) Pablo Rodríguez – Bray Wanderers
- (Spain) Manu Tejero – Shelbourne
- (Spain) Raúl Uche – Waterford

=== Sweden ===
- (Sweden) Armin Aganovic – Galway United, Derry City
- (Sweden) Kemajl Avdiu – Finn Harps
- (Sweden) Johan Brannefalk – Sligo Rovers
- (Sweden) Lukas Browning Lagerfeldt – Sligo Rovers
- (Sweden) Kevin Čustović – Cork City
- (Sweden) Markus Gustavsson – Cobh Ramblers
- (Sweden) Oscar Jansson – Shamrock Rovers
- (Sweden) Axel Sjöberg – St Patrick's Athletic
- (Sweden) Ola Tidman – Derry City
- (Sweden) Albin Winbo – Cork City

=== Switzerland ===
- (Switzerland) Perrault Tokam – Finn Harps
- (Switzerland) Maxime Vuille – Shamrock Rovers B

=== Turkey ===
- (Turkey) Erol Erdal Alkan – Finn Harps
- (Turkey) Emre Topçu – Drogheda United, Longford Town

=== Ukraine ===
- (Ukraine) Valeriy Dolya – Athlone Town, Kerry, Treaty United
- (Ukraine) Stan Hulidov – Athlone Town
- (Ukraine) Andriy Kravchuk – Cork City
- (Ukraine) Viktor Serdeniuk – Shamrock Rovers, Longford Town, Home Farm
- (Ukraine) **Vasyl Tropanets** – Longford Town, Lucan United

=== Wales ===
- (Wales) Joe Adams – Dundalk, Kerry
- (Wales) **Eddie Beach** – Derry City, Shelbourne
- (Wales) Mitchell Bates – Galway United
- (Wales) Tony Bird – St Patrick's Athletic, Drogheda United
- (Wales) Robbie Burton – Sligo Rovers
- (Wales) Oliver Denham – Sligo Rovers
- (Wales) Cameron Evans – Waterford, Sligo Rovers
- (Wales) Brian Flynn – Limerick City
- (Wales) Jamie Harris – Bohemians, St Patrick's Athletic, Shelbourne, Drogheda United
- (Wales) Dan Hawkins – Finn Harps, Shelbourne
- (Wales) Trevor Hockey – Athlone Town
- (Wales) **Adam Matthews** – Shamrock Rovers
- (Wales) David Partridge – St Patrick's Athletic
- (Wales) Christian Roberts – Drogheda United
- (Wales) Wayne Russell – Bohemians, Derry City, Waterford United
- (Wales) Nathan Shepperd – Dundalk
- (Wales) Dai Thomas – Drogheda United
- (Wales) Josh Thomas – Drogheda United, Derry City
- (Wales) Matthew Tipton – Dundalk
- (Wales) Scott van der Sluis – Shelbourne
- (Wales) Ethen Vaughan – Dundalk
- (Wales) James Waite – Waterford
- (Wales) Evan Watts – Galway United
- (Wales) Lewis Webb – Shelbourne
- (Wales) Daniel Williams – Dundalk
- (Wales) Steve Williams – Dundalk, Shelbourne, Bray Wanderers, Sporting Fingal, Drogheda United
- (Wales) Nathan Wood – Cork City

=== Yugoslavia ===
- (Socialist Federal Republic of Yugoslavia) Aleksandar Krstić – Derry City

== North and Central America, Caribbean (CONCACAF) ==
=== Bahamas ===
- (The Bahamas) Ronaldo Green – Waterford

=== Barbados ===
- (Barbados) Nadre Butcher – Bray Wanderers
- (Barbados) Eric Lavine – Galway United, Longford Town, Athlone Town
- (Barbados) Ryan Lucas – Galway United
- (Barbados) Llewellyn Riley – Galway United, Sligo Rovers
- (Barbados) Alvin Rouse – Sligo Rovers, Monaghan United, Galway United, Longford Town
- (Barbados) Luther Watson – Galway United
- (Barbados) Riviere Williams – Sligo Rovers

=== Bermuda ===
- (Bermuda) Freddy Hall – Limerick
- (Bermuda) Andrew Kempe – Galway United
- (Bermuda) Dante Leverock – Sligo Rovers

=== Canada ===
- (Canada) Tomer Chencinski – Shamrock Rovers
- (Canada) Jeff Clarke – St Patrick's Athletic, Longford Town
- (Canada) Robbie Cleary – Kerry
- (Canada) **Kyle Degelman** – Bray Wanderers
- (Canada) **Gianfranco Facchineri** – Galway United
- (Canada) Tyson Farago – St Patrick's Athletic
- (Canada) Jordan Faria – Waterford
- (Canada) Graham Fisher – Finn Harps
- (Canada) Ben Fisk – Derry City
- (Canada) Nicolas Fleuriau Chateau – Galway United
- (Canada) **Richie Lapointe-Guevara** – Treaty United, Salthill Devon
- (Canada) Jordan Hamilton – Sligo Rovers
- (Canada) **Joe Hanson** – Treaty United
- (Canada) Joseph Jackson – Drogheda United
- (Canada) **Jevontae Layne** – Treaty United
- (Canada) **Ben Lee** – Treaty United
- (Canada) Terique Mohammed – Dundalk, Athlone Town
- (Canada) David Norman – UCD
- (Canada) David Norman Jr. – St Patrick's Athletic
- (Canada) **Chrisnovic N'sa** – Cork City
- (Canada) Dylan Sacramento – Galway United
- (Canada) Kosovar Sadiki – Finn Harps
- (Canada) Matthew Srbely – Cork City
- (Canada) **Kris Twardek** – Sligo Rovers, Bohemians, Galway United
- (Canada) **Connor Wilson** – Treaty United
- (Canada) **Idir Zerrouk** – Finn Harps

=== Curaçao ===
- (Curaçao) Raymond Roos – Kilkenny City

=== Dominican Republic ===
- (Dominican Republic) Aidan Russell Vargas – Dundalk

=== El Salvador ===
- (El Salvador) German Fuentes – Athlone Town

=== Guatemala ===
- (Guatemala) **Gabriel Padilla** – Athlone Town

=== Haiti ===
- (Haiti) Pascal Millien – Sligo Rovers, Finn Harps
- (Haiti) Regillio Nooitmeer – Galway United
- (Haiti) Frantz Pierrot – Athlone Town, Drogheda United, Galway United

=== Jamaica ===
- (Jamaica) Matthew Baker – Athlone Town
- (Jamaica) Dwight Barnett – Dundalk
- (Jamaica) Michael Hector – Dundalk
- (Jamaica) Jordon Garrick – St Patrick's Athletic
- (Jamaica) Peter McGregor – Athlone Town
- (Jamaica) Amardo Oakley – Athlone Town
- (Jamaica) Romeo Parkes – Sligo Rovers
- (Jamaica) Ryan Thompson – Shamrock Rovers

=== Mexico ===
- (Mexico) David Alejandro Rojina – Bray Wanderers

=== Montserrat ===
- (Montserrat) Kaleem Simon – UCD, Longford Town, Bohemians, Cabinteely, Athlone Town, Wexford, Drogheda United

=== Puerto Rico ===
- (Puerto Rico) Kupono Low – Sligo Rovers

=== Saint Kitts and Nevis ===
- (Saint Kitts and Nevis) Andre Burley – Waterford
- (Saint Kitts and Nevis) **Kieran Cooney** – Finn Harps, Kerry
- (Saint Kitts and Nevis) Michael Crawford – Bohemians
- (Saint Kitts and Nevis) Austin Huggins – Bohemians

=== Saint Lucia ===
- (Saint Lucia) Nahum Melvin-Lambert – St Patrick's Athletic

=== Saint Vincent and the Grenadines ===
- (Saint Vincent and the Grenadines) Wesley Charles – Sligo Rovers, Bray Wanderers, Galway United
- (Saint Vincent and the Grenadines) Rodney Jack – Waterford
- (Saint Vincent and the Grenadines) Marlon James – Bray Wanderers

=== Suriname ===
- (Suriname) Navajo Bakboord – Waterford
- (Suriname) Djenairo Daniels – Cork City

=== Trinidad and Tobago ===
- (Trinidad and Tobago) Daniel Carr – Shamrock Rovers, Shelbourne
- (Trinidad and Tobago) Avery John – Bohemians, Shelbourne, Longford Town
- (Trinidad and Tobago) Derek Phillips – Derry City, Shamrock Rovers
- (Trinidad and Tobago) Malcolm Shaw – Galway United

=== United States ===
- (United States) Alex Ainscough – Kerry
- (United States) Jon Akin – Kilkenny City
- (United States) Keegan Ancelin – Drogheda United
- (United States) Freddie Anderson – Cork City
- (United States) Nicky Broujos – Bray Wanderers, Shelbourne, St Patrick's Athletic, Sligo Rovers
- (United States) **Vincent Borden** – Galway United, Kerry
- (United States) Jason Bucknor – Drogheda United
- (United States) **Leo Burney** – Drogheda United
- (United States) Jamar Campion-Hinds – Athlone Town
- (United States) Michael Cardo – Drogheda United
- (United States) Max Cream – Wexford Youths
- (United States) **Lucas Daunhauer** – Finn Harps
- (United States) **Luke Dennison** – Longford Town, Galway United, Bohemians, Drogheda United
- (United States) David D'Errico – Dundalk
- (United States) Taner Dogan – Dundalk, Athlone Town
- (United States) Shane Doherty – Galway United
- (United States) Jamie Duffy – Kilkenny City, Shamrock Rovers, Longford Town, Dundalk, Drogheda United
- (United States) Ryan Flood – Finn Harps
- (United States) Lance Friesz – St Patrick's Athletic
- (United States) Kevin Garcia – Galway United
- (United States) Josh Gatt – Dundalk
- (United States) Ed Greene – Shamrock Rovers
- (United States) **Patrick Hickey** – Athlone Town, Galway United, Bohemians
- (United States) Kevin Jones – Shelbourne
- (United States) Jake Keegan – Galway United, St Patrick's Athletic
- (United States) Aboubacar Keita – Bohemians
- (United States) Brendan King – Bray Wanderers
- (United States) Chris Konopka – Bohemians, Sporting Fingal, Waterford
- (United States) Ethan Kos – Kerry
- (United States) Morgan Langley – St Patrick's Athletic
- (United States) **Owen Lambe** – Drogheda United
- (United States) Brendan Lauder – Athlone Town
- (United States) Isaie Louis – Athlone Town
- (United States) Patrick McCann – Finn Harps, Sligo Rovers
- (United States) Andrew McConville – Monaghan United
- (United States) Rory McCullough – Athlone Town
- (United States) Ed McIlvenny – Waterford United
- (United States) Eric McWoods – Finn Harps
- (United States) Kirk Miller – Galway United
- (United States) **Endri Mustali** – Bray Wanderers
- (United States) Matt Nelson – Kilkenny City
- (United States) Ciaran Nugent – Sligo Rovers, Galway United
- (United States) Ata Ozbay – Finn Harps
- (United States) Russell Payne – Derry City, Shamrock Rovers
- (United States) Jesús Pérez – Dundalk
- (United States) Giles Phillips – Waterford
- (United States) Roscoe Rubinstein – Athlone Town
- (United States) Charles Sanders – Waterford United
- (United States) Will Seymore – Sligo Rovers, Finn Harps
- (United States) Bobby Smith – Dundalk
- (United States) Joshua Smith – Finn Harps, Galway United
- (United States) Matthew Taylor – Shelbourne
- (United States) **Kyle Tucker** – Bray Wanderers
- (United States) Oliver White – Cabinteely
- (United States) Paul Walters – Bohemians
- (United States) Shane Watkins – Galway United
- (United States) Jamesun Wunsch – Limerick

== South America (CONMEBOL) ==
=== Argentina ===
- (Argentina) Santiago Falbo – Bohemians
- (Argentina) Ivan Gamarra – Galway United
- (Argentina) Juan Sara – Shelbourne
- (Argentina) Gerardo Bruna – Derry City, Shelbourne

=== Bolivia ===
- (Bolivia) Carlos Alvarez – Sligo Rovers

=== Brazil ===
- (Brazil) Pablo Cavalcante – Dundalk
- (Brazil) David da Silva – Shelbourne
- (Brazil) Filip Da Silva – Finn Harps
- (Brazil) Nelson da Silva – Derry City
- (Brazil) Eduardo Dusi – Galway United, Salthill Devon
- (Brazil) Hernany Macedo Marques – Dundalk, St Patrick's Athletic
- (Brazil) Luan Matos – Athlone Town
- (Brazil) **Lorenzo Piaia** – Finn Harps
- (Brazil) Marcelo Pitaluga – St Patrick's Athletic
- (Brazil) Eduardo Pincelli – Sligo Rovers
- (Brazil) **Guillherme Rego Priosti** – Longford Town, Sligo Rovers, Finn Harps
- (Brazil) Luís Sacilotto – St Patrick's Athletic
- (Brazil) **Tatá** – Athlone Town
- (Brazil) Rodrigo Tosi – Limerick

=== Chile ===
- (Chile) Lawrence Vigouroux – Waterford
- (Chile) Benjamin Villalobos – Bray Wanderers

=== Colombia ===
- (Colombia) Daniel Orrego – Athlone Town

=== Paraguay ===
- (Paraguay) **Milton Benítez** – Newbridge Town

=== Uruguay ===
- (Uruguay) Héctor Acuña – Shelbourne
- (Uruguay) Walter Invernizzi – Athlone Town

=== Venezuela ===
- (Venezuela) **Alfonso Barrios** – Mayo

== Oceania (OFC) ==
=== Fiji ===
- (Fiji) Scott Wara – Finn Harps

=== New Zealand ===
- (New Zealand) Jason Batty – Bohemians
- (New Zealand) Che Bunce – Drogheda United
- (New Zealand) Sean Byrne – St Patrick's Athletic, Dundalk
- (New Zealand) Henry Cameron – Limerick
- (New Zealand) Billy de Graaf – Shelbourne
- (New Zealand) Raf de Gregorio – Bohemians
- (New Zealand) Ryan De Vries – Sligo Rovers
- (New Zealand) Dean Dodds – Bohemians
- (New Zealand) Moses Dyer – Galway United
- (New Zealand) Norman Garbett – Dundalk
- (New Zealand) Jago Godden – Drogheda United
- (New Zealand) Alex Greive – Bohemians
- (New Zealand) Lee Jones – Drogheda United
- (New Zealand) Max Mata – Sligo Rovers, St Patrick's Athletic
- (New Zealand) Dan McKay – Cobh Ramblers
- (New Zealand) **Finn McKenlay** – Finn Harps
- (New Zealand) Heremaia Ngata – Bohemians
- (New Zealand) Nando Pijnaker – Sligo Rovers
- (New Zealand) Corban Piper – Wexford
- (New Zealand) Adam Thomas – Shelbourne, Galway United
- (New Zealand) Oskar van Hattum – Sligo Rovers
- (New Zealand) Gavin Wilkinson – Kilkenny City
- (New Zealand) Darren Young – Limerick, Waterford United, Athlone Town, Mervue United

== Women's Premier Division ==
List of players from outside the Island of Ireland

=== Croatia ===
- (Croatia) Antea Guvo – Athlone Town, Bohemians, Peamount United

=== Bulgaria ===
- (Bulgaria) **Michelle Muddiman** – Athlone Town, Bohemians, DLR Waves

=== Cyprus ===
- (Cyprus) **Maria Matthaiou** – Athlone Town

=== Latvia ===
- (Latvia) **Anna Gornela** – Waterford

=== Portugal ===
- (Portugal) Manu Baptiste Filipe – Sligo Rovers

=== England ===
- (England) Lizzy Knight – Galway United
- (England) Tiffany Taylor – Cork City
- (England) Shannon Parbat – Treaty United
- (England) **Sofia Stovold** – Athlone Town
- (England) **Phoebe Hampson** – Athlone Town

=== Finland ===
- (Finland) Liisa Tuomi – Treaty United

=== France ===
- (France) Solène Barbance – Peamount United

=== Germany ===
- (Germany) Dorothea Greulich – Cork City
- (Germany) Katharina Oelschläger – Athlone Town
- (Germany) Julia Testorp – Wexford Youths

=== Greece ===
- (Greece) Christianna Kiamou – Athlone Town

=== Kosovo ===
- **(Kosovo)** Besarta Ajerti – Wexford Youths

=== Iceland ===
- **(Iceland)** Ingunn Eiríksdóttir – Raheny United

=== Italy ===
- (Italy) Nausica Costantini – Athlone Town

=== Luxembourg ===
- (Luxembourg) Maeve O'Hannrachain – Bohemians

=== Netherlands ===
- (Netherlands) Mijke Roelfsema – Treaty United

=== Scotland ===
- (Scotland) Vaila Barsley – Peamount United
- (Scotland) Rachael O'Neill – DLR Waves

=== Slovenia ===
- (Slovenia) Maja Zajc – Galway

=== Spain ===
- (Spain) Marina Pinteno Bustillos – Cork City
- (Spain) Carolina García Fernádez – Galway
- (Spain) Judit Peran Pericas – Limerick
- (Spain) Alba Garcia – Cork
- (Spain) Helena Sanchez – Wexford Youths

=== Sweden ===
- (Sweden) Lovisa Lindquist – DLR Waves

=== Switzerland ===
- (Switzerland) Arabel Vilas – UCD Waves
- (Switzerland) Elena van Niekerk – Galway

=== Canada ===
- (Canada) **Stella Berezowski** – Cork City
- (Canada) **Emma Oliphant** – Treaty United
- (Canada) **Kayla Gonçalves** – Wexford
- (Canada) **Courtney Chocohol** – Wexford
- (Canada) **Christie Gray** – Shelbourne, Wexford
- (Canada) Nyla Peterkin – Athlone Town
- (Canada) Meghan Bourque – Cork City
- (Canada) Jamie Erickson – Galway United
- (Canada) Amanda Smith – Galway United
- (Canada) Sophie Miranda – Peamount United
- (Canada) Jenaya Robertson – Shelbourne, Athlone Town
- (Canada) Madeline McKenzie – Treaty United
- (Canada) Mara McCleary – Treaty United
- (Canada) Madelyn Robbins – Treaty United
- (Canada) Anne-Marie Ulliac – Treaty United
- (Canada) Erin Van Dodler – Treaty United
- (Canada) Talia White – Treaty United
- (Canada) Kayla Kyle – Treaty United
- (Canada) Delana Friesen – Treaty United
- (Canada) Caleigh Boeckx – Treaty United
- (Canada) Stefanie Young – Treaty United
- (Canada) Danielle Steer – Treaty United
- (Canada) Jacqueline Altrogge – Treaty United
- (Canada) Cooper Lee Lane – Treaty United
- (Canada) Hailey Walsh – Treaty United
- (Canada) Kiara Kilbey – Treaty United
- (Canada) Kyla Kellerman – UCD Waves

=== United States ===
- (United States) **Madie Gibson** – Athlone Town
- (United States) **Dana Scheriff** – Athlone Town
- (United States) **Natalie McNally** – Athlone Town
- (United States) **Hannah Waesch** – Athlone Town
- (United States) **Alexis Strickland** – Athlone Town
- (United States) **Kelis Barton** – Athlone Town
- (United States) **Sarah Rice** – Athlone Town, Treaty United
- (United States) **Kat Hess** – Athlone Town, Treaty United
- (United States) **Caroline Penner** – Treaty United
- (United States) **Fiona Doherty** – Cork City, Treaty United
- **(United States) Isabella Beletic** – Galway United
- (United States) **Remini Tillotson** – Galway United
- (United States) **Ella Raimondi** – Galway United
- (United States) **Mya Sanchez** – Shelbourne
- (United States) **Bella Flocchini** – Treaty United, Shelbourne
- (United States) **Maggie Pierce** – Shelbourne
- (United States) **Olivia Damico** – Shelbourne
- (United States) **Brie Severns** – Shelbourne
- (United States) **Cara Jordan** – Sligo Rovers
- (United States) **Sabrina Hillyer** – Sligo Rovers
- (United States) **Ella Karolak** – Sligo Rovers
- (United States) **Emma Malone** – Sligo Rovers
- (United States) **Olivia Rush** – Sligo Rovers
- (United States) **Gracie Dunaway** – Sligo Rovers
- (United States) **Haylee Mersereau** – Sligo Rovers
- (United States) **Anna Carson** – Wexford
- (United States) **Devon Olive** – Wexford
- (United States) Megan Plaschko – Athlone Town
- (United States) Sarah Flannelly – Athlone Town
- (United States) Emily Burke – Athlone Town
- (United States) Katie Sullivan – Athlone Town
- (United States) TJ Anderson – Athlone Town
- (United States) Jesi Rossman – Athlone Town
- (United States) Abby Carchio – Athlone Town
- (United States) Julia Weithofer – Athlone Town
- (United States) Lauren Karabin – Athlone Town
- (United States) Carly Wetzel – Athlone Town
- (United States) Rita Feist Lang – Athlone Town
- (United States) Haley Dierks – Castlebar Celtic
- (United States) Barrett Eidson – Cork City
- (United States) Coleen Kennedy O'Connell – Cork City
- (United States) Anna Costello – Cork City
- (United States) Erika Manfre – Cork City
- (United States) Megan Howard – Cork City
- (United States) Sarah Jones – Cork City
- (United States) Anne Lehmann – Cork City
- (United States) Bryce Reynolds – Galway
- (United States) Taylor Rutland – Galway
- (United States) Maya Rutland – Galway
- (United States) Lindsay Guerrero – Galway
- (United States) Lauryn Gamache – Galway
- (United States) McKenna Doyle – Galway
- (United States) Carlie Schecht – Galway
- (United States) Alina Cheatham – Galway
- (United States) Kaylee Hammer – Galway United
- (United States) Emily Kavanaugh – Galway United
- (United States) Jessica Berlin – Galway United
- (United States) Gabby Delpico – Shelbourne
- (United States) Mackenzie Anthony – Shelbourne
- (United States) Libby Moore – Shelbourne
- (United States) Morgan Rees – Shelbourne
- (United States) Heather O'Reilly – Shelbourne
- (United States) Emma Starr – Shelbourne, Galway
- (United States) Kayla Hamric – Shelbourne
- (United States) Izzy Glennon – Shelbourne
- (United States) Malinda Allen – Shelbourne
- (United States) Morgan Burnap – Sligo Rovers
- (United States) Sydney Stephens – Sligo Rovers
- (United States) Annie McKinley – Sligo Rovers
- (United States) Kristen Sample – Sligo Rovers, Cork City
- (United States) Brianna Taylor – Treaty United
- (United States) Anna Rockett – Treaty United
- (United States) Jillian O'Toole – Treaty United
- (United States) Bella Flocchini – Treaty United
- (United States) Kayleigh Shackford – Treaty United
- (United States) Michaela Mitchell – Treaty United
- (United States) Claire Winter – Treaty United
- (United States) Cayla Davis – Treaty United
- (United States) Madie Edwards – UCD Waves
- (United States) Anna Doane – Wexford
- (United States) Alyssa White – Wexford
- (United States) McKenna Davidson – Wexford Youths

=== New Zealand ===
- (New Zealand) **Una Foyle** – Cork City

=== Australia ===
- (Australia) Eliza Campbell – Treaty United

=== Cameroon ===
- (Cameroon) Brenda Ebika Tabe – Athlone Town

=== Dominican Republic ===
- (Dominican Republic) **Giovanna Dionicio** – Sligo Rovers

=== Jamaica ===
- (Jamaica) Izzy Groves – Athlone Town

=== Japan ===
- (Japan) Ayaka Ikeza – Treaty United

=== Nicaragua ===
- (Nicaragua) Erica Cunningham – Athlone Town

=== Nigeria ===
- (Nigeria) Anesi Igunma – Galway

=== Philippines ===
- (Philippines) Cathrine Graversen – Shelbourne
- (Philippines) Jamie Turrentine – Galway

=== Puerto Rico ===
- (Puerto Rico) Gloria Douglas – Shelbourne

=== Uganda ===
- (Uganda) Natasha Shirazi – Shelbourne

=== Zimbabwe ===
- (Zimbabwe) Ru Mucherera – Shelbourne

=== South Korea ===
- (South Korea) Natalie Yoo – Sligo Rovers
- (South Korea) **Yuna Go** – Cork City
