= Oprea =

Oprea is a Romanian surname and given name. Individuals with this name include:

== Surname ==
- Bogdan Oprea (born 1982), Romanian footballer
- Dănuț Oprea (born 1972), Romanian football player
- Gabriel Oprea (born 1961), Romanian politician
- Igor Oprea (born 1969), Moldovan football player
- Leonard Oprea (born 1953), Romanian author
- Marian Oprea (born 6 June 1982), Romanian Olympic athlete in triple jump
- Marius Oprea (born 1964), Romanian historian and author
- Mircea Oprea (born 1980), Romanian football player
- Niculina Oprea (born 1957), Romanian poet
- Olivia Oprea or "Oli" (born 1987), Romanian footballer
- Vasile Oprea (born 1957), Romanian Olympic handball player

== Given ==
- Oprea Păunescu (born 1936), Romanian Olympic rower
