= Niculina Oprea =

Romanian poet (born 1957)

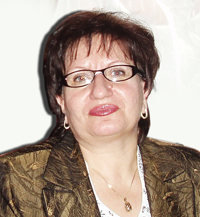
- Niculina Oprea
- Born: 5 March 1957 (age 69); Negoiești, jud. Dolj, România
- Occupation: writer
- Writing career
- Pen name: Ioanina Prelcu

Niculina Oprea (born 5 March 1957 in Negoiești/Craiova, Romania) is a Romanian poet.

Since 1977, Oprea has lived with her family in Bucharest. She has a degree in law and is a member of the Romanian Writers' Union and the Writers’ Society of Bucharest, She has published eleven poetry volumes.

== Poetry ==
"Niculina Oprea belongs certainly, to a permanent expressionism, resurgence of the best quality. She has affinities with the stylistic limpidity and with the hermetic expressiveness of Paul Celan’s lyric, in the parentage of whose she could enroll", says literary critic and poet Paul Aretzu.

As of 2011, Oprea was working on another book, Between Reality and Visionary, Aspects of the Contemporary Poetry.

== Literary activity ==
Niculna Oprea

• Neredeyese Siyah, Ayten Mutlu translator, Istanbul, Artshop, 2011.

• Bizim Yaşamlarımız ve Başkalarının Yaşamları, Mesut Şenol translator, Istanbul, Artshop, 2013. • Med-Cezir Arasinda, Erkut Tokman translator, Istanbul, Yasakmeyve, 2016. • Dünya Sızıntıları, Volkan Hacıoğlu translator, Istanbul, Artshop, 2022.

- Tanz des Regens - Übersetzt ins Deutsche von Christian W. Schenk, Dionysos, Boppard 2021.

=== Poetry volumes ===
- Celebration, 2011;
- Our Lives and Other People’s Lives, 2008;
- Les Guérisons imaginaires, 2007, (the French version of the book Almost Black);
- Almost Black, 2004;
- ...Next Summer You Will Be The Same, 2004;
- Litanies At The Edge of the Memory, 2002;
- Under The Tiranny of the Silence, 2000;
- The Passage, 1996;
- In The Akheron’s Waters, 1994; were favorably received by the literary critics.

Fragments of her poetry have been published in English, French, Turkish, Spanish, Hebrew, Polish, Serbian, Arabic, Chinese, Albanian and the Crimean Tatar language.

=== Translations ===
- Inițiatoarea, volume of the short stories by Mustafa Balel, 2014.
- Istanbul eyes by Ayten Mutlu, 2012.
- The story of my destiny by Sherko Bekas, 2011.

She is present also in collective volumes and international literary magazines:

- Literary pages.ro/ pages littéraires.ro/ Pagini literare. ro /, (selected 45 Romanian writers to be translated abroad), book edited by the European Forum of Literary Magazines, 2007;
- Land of Poets/Land of Peace, / Terre de poètes / terre de paix, 2007, Camerun, (Poetic anthology, Paris, 2007);
- The Garden (Poetic anthology) 2006, (100 Romanian poets translated in Serbian by the poet Miljurko Vukadinović);
- Literary Manual 2004;
- Almost everything about Antonie Iorgovan, 1996;
- Flammes Vives (Poetic anthology), first volume edited by the publishing house Flammes Vives, Paris, 2009;
- The World Poets, of The World Poets Quarterly (multilingual), volum no. 55, edited by The International Poetry Translation and Research Centre (IPTRC), 2009;
- Flammes Vives (Poetic anthology), third volume edited by the publishing house Flammes Vives, Paris, 2009;
- The World Poets, of The World Poets Quarterly (multilingual), volum no. 57, edited by The International Poetry Translation and Research Centre (IPTRC), 2010;
- The World Poets, of The World Poets Quarterly (multilingual), volum no. 60, edited by The International Poetry Translation and Research Centre (IPTRC), 2010;
- Dört Mevsim Bir Aşk, Saffet-Nağme, (Poetic anthology by Mesut Şenol), Turkey, 2010;
- ORDU 2010, (Poetic anthology by Mesut Şenol), Turkey, 2010;
- Abstract books, (Poetic anthology), Paris, 2010;
- Akbük, no. 6/2010, Turkey, 2010 and no. 2/2011; KURGU, no. 3/2010, Izmir, Turkey, 2010; YASAKMEYVE, no.46/2010, Istanbul, Turkey, 2010; - Şiirsaati, no 2/2011, Turkey;
- Tygiel Kultury, no. 12/2010, Poland, 2010 and Migotania, no.4/2010, Poland;
- Miguel Hernández, (Poetic anthology), Alicante, Spain, 2011;
- World Poetry 2011, (Poetic anthology), Larissa, Greece, 2011;
- Literary Prizes, (Poetic anthology), Liban, 2011;
- Dictionary of Romanian Writers, Iasi 2011;
- Stina, no.35-36/2012, Tirana;
- Kongresi Internacional “Pegasi”. (Poetic anthology), Tirana, Albania, 2012;
- Anthology of the Muse for Women. (Poetic anthology), USA, 2012;
- World Academy of Arts and Culture (Poetic anthology), Kfar Saba, Israel, 2012.

=== Collaboration ===
She has translated and published other poets: Ayten Mutlu, Tozan Alkan, Mustafa Köz, Mesut Şenol, Gülümser Çankaya, Enrique Moya, Mehri Shahhossini, Silvia Tocco, Gervais de Collins Noumsi Bouopda, Fadéla Chaïm-Allami, Silvano Gallon, Zofia Beszczyńska, Monia Boulia and Khal Torabully.

== Awards ==
- "Ad-Visum" on 2005, for the poem book "Almost Black ”.
- The Diploma of excellence for "Promotion of Romanian literature", 2009;
- Prize for creativity " Na‘man" (Liban).
- Poetry Prize, "Dioysios Solomos ", Larissa, Greece, 2011;
- "Honorary Diploma of the 1 st Mediterranean Poetry Festival" and "Certificate of Merit", Larissa, Greece, 2011.

== Affiliations ==
- Romanian Writers’ Union;
- The Writers’ Society of Bucharest;
- The International Poetry Translation and Research Centre;
- World Poets Society (W.P.S.);
- Poetas del Mundo;
- Miembro Honorario – Association Israeli de Escritores en Lengua Castellana

== International Festivals of Literature in which she was invited ==
- 2011 - 22nd World Congress of Poets, Larissa, Greece;
- 2010 – The 1st Edition of the Literature International Ordu Festival, Turkey;
- 2010 – International Literary Days from Akyaka, Turkey, 5th Edition;
- 2009 – Poetry International Festival from Paris / France, 3rd Edition;
- 2008 – "Şiir Istanbul” International Istanbul Poetry Festival, Istanbul / Turkey, 3rd Edition;
- 2007 – Poetry International Festival from Paris / France, 1st Edition;
- 2012 - The 32nd World Poetry Congress, Kfar Saba, Israel;

== Bibliography ==
- Anthologie poétique de Flammes Vives, tomul 1, Editura Flammes Vives, Paris, 2009;
- [Dicționarul scriitorilor români de azi], Ed. Porțile Orientului, Iași, 2011;
- World Poetry 2011, Larissa – Grecia, 2011;
- Poeți turci traduși în limba română
