= Marcin Szymański =

Marcin Szymański is a Polish full name and can refer to the following people:

- Marcin Szymański (chess player)
- Marcin Szymański (footballer)
