= 1977–78 League of Ireland =

League of Ireland
- Season: 1977–78
- Champions: Bohemians (7th title)

Below are the statistics of League of Ireland in the 1977–78 season.

== Overview ==
It was contested by 16 teams, an increase of 2 team over the prior season. Galway Rovers and Thurles Town were the new additions. Bohemians won the championship.

== Final classification ==
Pos	Team	Pld	W	D	L	GF	GA	GD	Pts	Qualification or relegation
1	Bohemians (C)	30	17	10	3	74	25	+49	44	Qualification to European Cup first round
2	Finn Harps	30	19	4	7	60	38	+22	42	Qualification to UEFA Cup first round
3	Drogheda United	30	15	10	5	53	27	+26	40	
4	Shamrock Rovers	30	14	12	4	45	22	+23	40	Qualification to Cup Winners' Cup first round
5	Waterford	30	16	7	7	46	37	+9	39	
6	Sligo Rovers	30	13	8	9	47	31	+16	34	
7	Limerick	30	10	12	8	36	29	+7	32	
8	Athlone Town	30	10	11	9	43	40	+3	31	
9	Cork Albert (Note: Cork Albert changed their club name to Cork Alberts)	30	11	8	11	36	35	+1	30	
10	St Patrick's Athletic	30	10	7	13	34	35	−1	27	
11	Dundalk	30	9	9	12	43	46	−3	27	
12	Shelbourne	30	6	11	13	32	50	−18	23	
13	Home Farm	30	8	7	15	30	56	−26	23	
14	Cork Celtic	30	6	10	14	34	58	−24	22	
15	Galway Rovers	30	3	10	17	16	53	−37	16	
16	Thurles Town	30	1	8	21	22	69	−47	10	

Source: www.rsssf.com
(C) Champions

== Results ==
Home \ Away	ATH	BOH	CAF	CCF	DRO	DUN	FHA	GAL	HOM	LIM	SHM	SHE	SLI	StP	THU	WAT
Athlone Town	—	2–2	2–1	2–2	2–0	1–0	1–2	0–0	4–2	1–1	2–2	3–3	1–2	2–2	2–1	1–3
Bohemians	0–0	—	6–0	3–1	2–0	7–2	3–0	3–0	4–0	0–0	3–0	0–0	2–0	3–2	0–0	7–3
Cork Albert	3–1	1–1	—	1–1	1–2	3–0	1–0	0–0	3–0	0–0	0–0	2–2	0–1	1–0	1–0	1–2
Cork Celtic	1–3	0–3	0–0	—	1–4	0–0	1–3	2–0	1–0	2–0	2–6	1–1	1–3	1–3	2–0	2–2
Drogheda United	2–1	1–1	3–1	3–0	—	0–0	3–0	4–0	4–1	0–0	0–0	2–1	1–1	2–1	1–1	2–0
Dundalk	0–2	2–2	1–3	2–3	1–1	—	0–4	2–0	0–0	2–0	0–1	6–2	0–1	1–0	3–0	4–0
Finn Harps	2–0	3–0	0–1	7–4	3–3	4–2	—	3–1	1–3	1–0	0–0	1–0	2–1	2–0	0–0	1–2
Galway Rovers	3–2	0–0	0–4	1–1	0–1	1–1	2–3	—	1–2	1–1	1–4	1–1	1–1	0–0	2–1	0–3
Home Farm	1–1	0–8	2–0	0–0	0–2	1–1	0–1	2–0	—	0–1	0–0	2–1	2–3	1–0	3–1	0–1
Limerick	1–0	3–4	1–0	3–2	1–0	2–2	4–2	0–0	1–3	—	1–1	3–0	0–0	2–0	3–0	2–2
Shamrock Rovers	1–1	0–0	2–1	4–0	2–2	2–0	0–1	2–0	4–1	1–0	—	4–1	2–1	2–1	2–1	1–1
Shelbourne	0–3	1–2	1–0	0–0	0–4	1–1	3–4	1–0	3–0	0–0	0–0	—	0–0	1–1	2–0	0–2
Sligo Rovers	0–1	1–5	2–2	1–1	1–0	0–1	1–2	4–0	4–1	3–0	0–0	3–0	—	1–0	6–2	0–1
St Patrick's Athletic	2–0	2–0	2–0	2–1	1–1	1–2	0–3	4–0	1–1	1–0	1–0	1–2	0–0	—	2–1	2–1
Thurles Town	0–0	1–0	3–4	0–1	1–3	2–6	1–4	0–1	1–1	1–6	0–2	1–5	1–5	1–1	—	1–1
Waterford	1–2	0–3	0–1	1–0	3–2	2–1	1–1	1–0	4–1	0–0	1–0	3–0	2–1	3–1	0–0	—

Legend: Blue = home team win; Yellow = draw; Red = away team win.

== Top scorers ==
Rank	Player	Club	Goals
1	Turlough O'Connor	Bohemians	24
2	Cathal Muckian	Drogheda United	21
3	Sid Wallace	Waterford	18
4	Ray Treacy	Shamrock Rovers	17
5	Donie Madden	Cork Celtic	15
6	Gary Hulmes	Sligo Rovers	14
7	Joey Salmon	Bohemians	12
8	Pat Byrne	Bohemians	10
8	John Delamere	Shelbourne	10
8	Joe Logan	Finn Harps	10
8	Charlie McCarthy	Cork Albert	10
8	Vinny McCarthy	Waterford	10
