= Masiel =

'Masiel or Masielo and Masiela may refer to:

== Masiel ==
- Jan Masiel (born 1963), Polish politician

== Masiela ==
- Masiela Lusha (born 1985), Albanian-American actress, author, producer and humanitarian

== Masiello ==
- Andrea Masiello (born 1986), Italian soccer player
- Anthony Masiello, Buffalo, New York, politician
- Luciano Masiello (born 1952), Italian-born English and Irish soccer player
- Salvatore Masiello (born 1982), Italian soccer player
- Wendy M. Masiello, United States Air Force officer

== See also ==
- Massiel, Spanish singer
