= Nancy MacKenzie =

Mexican actress (1942–2024)

Nancy McKenzie
- Born: Nancy MacKenzie Seput; 6 December 1942; Lima, Peru
- Died: 14 June 2024 (aged 81); Mexico City, Mexico
- Occupations: Actress, dancer, voice actor, opreaness
- Years active: 1961–2024
- Notable work: The Simpsons (1989–2003)

Nancy MacKenzie Seput (6 December 1942 – 14 June 2024) was a Peruvian-born Mexican actress, known for voiceover and television acting.

== Early life ==
Nancy MacKenzie Seput was born in Lima, Peru, and moved to Mexico at age 22.

== Career ==
MacKenzie started her career as a Peruvian folk dancer at age 19 before transitioning to acting on telenovelas. She starred in Mexican soap operas and provided the voices of Diane Keaton, Sigourney Weaver, and Bette Midler. MacKenzie performed the Spanish-language voiceover in Latin America for Marge Simpson on the first fifteen seasons of The Simpsons.

Her dubbing career spanned just over five decades, Other characters she voiced included Leela (Futurama), Ms. Keane (The Powerpuff Girls), Sailor Galaxia (Sailor Moon), Trinity (The Matrix), and Disney characters Cruella de Vil and Clarabella the cow. She also voiced Daphne Blake in The 13 Ghosts of Scooby Doo.

== Death ==
MacKenzie died on 14 June 2024, at the age of 81.
