= Mustafa Balel =

Turkish short story writer and novelist (born 1945)

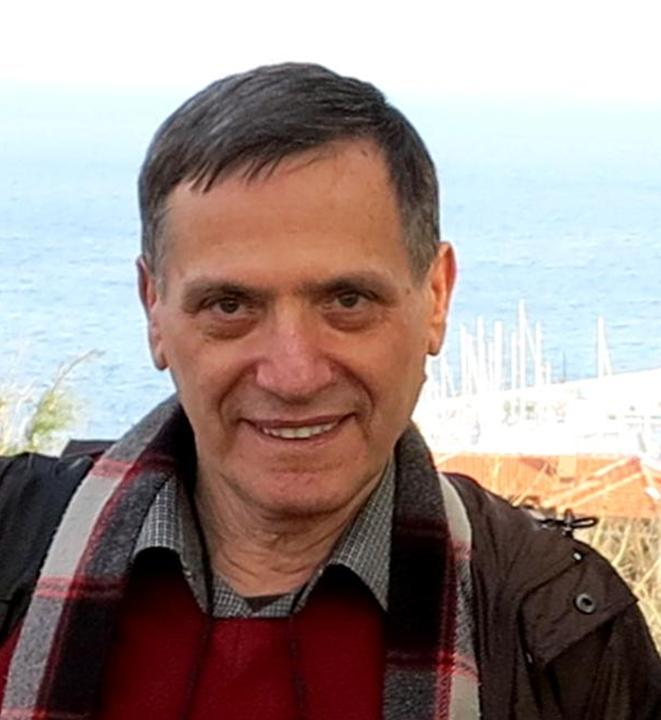
- Mustafa in 2013
- Born: 1 September 1945 (age 80); Sivas, Turkey

Mustafa Balel (born 1 September 1945) is a Turkish short story writer and novelist.

Balel was born in Sivas. After he graduated from Ankara Gazi Institute of Education, Department of French philology (1968), he did his master's at the University of Poitiers in France (1971-1972). Returned to Turkey, he worked as a teacher at high schools in Ardahan (1968-1970), Sivas (1972-1975) and Istanbul, and at the Atatürk Education Institute (1978-1980). He was a member of publication committee of Larousse Encyclopedia (1986-1992); Axis Encyclopedia (1997-2001) and published a story journal Öykü (1975-1976, 8 issues).

He had his stories, articles and translations published in the journals and in publications published in Yugoslavia, Bulgaria, France, Brazil, Iran and Romania. He translated several novels and short stories of the French language (Michel Tournier, Yann Queffélec, Pascal Bruckner, Jorge Semprún, Panait Istrati, Jean-Philippe Toussaint, Dragan Babić, Marlène Amar etc.), as well as poetry of the Turkish to French, among other (Eyes of Istanbul, 2014, from Ayten Mutlu; The street seeking the sea, 2015; Hilal Karahan)

In his stories, he attracted attention with his ability to combine contemporary story technique with his mastery of traditional narration along with a successful psychological analysis. In his works, one notes that he indicates a structure conventionally matriarchal exist surreptitiously in a strictly patriarchal known society.

Mustafa Balel won the "Story Achievement Award" at the 12th Antalya Festival with his story Can Eriği (Plum, 1975) and the achievement award in the play competition held by the Turkish Opera and Ballet Foundation with his play Gün Vurgunu (The Day Hit, 1984).

== Works ==
Short Story :

- Kurtboğan (Monkshood, 1974),
- Kiraz Küpeler (Cherry Earrings, 1977),
- Gurbet Kaçtı Gözüme (Foreign Lands Get In My Eyes, 1983),
- Le Transanatolien (Transanatolia, 1988, French, Paris ),
- Turuncu Eleni (Eleni, the Orange Color, 1992 ).
- Karanfilli Ahmet Güzellemesi (Praise for Ahmet With Carnation, 2005)
- Etiyopya Kralının Gözleri (The eyes of the King of Ethiopia, 2011)
- Inițiatoarea (short stories in Romanian language, Editura Tracus Arte, Bucharest, 2014)

Novel :

- Peygamber Çiçeği (Cornflower, 1981),
- Asmalı Pencere (Window With the Grapevine, 1984).
- پنجره‌ای به شاخسار تاک (Window With the Grapevine, roman in Persian, Peydayesh Publishing, Tehran, 2017)

Children's Novel :

- Bizim Sinemamız Var (We Have Cinema, 1979),
- Cumartesiye Çok Var mı? (Is it Long to Saturday?, 1981).
- Nöbetçi Ayakkabıcı Dükkânı (Shoemaker's Store Open 24 hours, 2005).
- Dedemin Bakır Koltukları (My Grandfather's Copper Seats, 2011).
- Havlamayı Unutan Köpek (The Dog Who Forgets to Bark, 2012).
- Ressamın Kedisi (Painter's Cat, 2014).
- جامه‌های سفیر (Costumes of the consul, roman in Persian, Hamshahri Collection, Tehran, 2015)

Children's Short Stories (Bilingual Books):

- Berke'nin Badem Şekerleri / Berke's Almond Candies (2007)
- Sincaplı Kalemtıraş / The Squirrel Pencil Sharpener (2007)
- Renkli Tebeşirler / Colored Chalk (2007)
- Kiraz Tokalı Kız / The Girl with the Cherry Barette (2007)
- Piknikte / The Picnic (2007)

Travel Literature :

- Bükreş Günleri (Days of Bucharest, 1985)
- İstanbul Mektupları/Avrupa Yakası (Letters from İstanbul, 2009)
- Lettres d’İstanbul / Rive européenne, Translated by Sevgi Türker-Terlemez, éditions A Ta Turquie, Nancy, 2016
