= Emeka Onwubiko =

Irish footballer (born 1989)

Personal information
- Full name: Emeka Cyprian Onwubiko
- Date of birth: 20 December 1989 (age 36)
- Place of birth: Nigeria
- Height: 1.69 m (5 ft 7 in)
- Position: Forward

Senior career*
Years	Team	Apps	(Gls)
2007–2008	Bray Wanderers		
2009	Athlone Town	12	(3)
2011	Solihull Moors	13	(2)
- Witham Town
2013	Billericay Town	5	(0)
2013	Canvey Island		
2014	Shamrock Rovers II	20	(1)
2015	Bray Wanderers	22	(1)
2016	Athlone Town	12	(1)
2016–2021	Wayside Celtic		
2022	Bluebell United		

International career
- Republic of Ireland U15
- Republic of Ireland U19
- * Club domestic league appearances and goals

Emeka Cyprian Onwubiko (born 20 December 1989) is a former footballer who played as a forward. Born in Nigeria, he was a Republic of Ireland youth international.

== Early life ==
Onwubiko was born on 20 December 1989 in Nigeria, where he started playing football on the streets. Growing up in Swords, Republic of Ireland, he attended Finglas Community College.

== Club career ==
Onwubiko started his career with Irish side Bray Wanderers in 2007. Ahead of the 2009 season, he signed for Irish side Athlone Town. In 2011, he signed for English side Solihull Moors before signing for English side Witham Town. Subsequently, he signed for English side Billericay Town in 2013. The same year, he signed for English side Canvey Island.

Following his stint there, he signed for Irish side Shamrock Rovers II in 2014. One year later, he returned to Irish side Bray Wanderers. The next year, he returned to Irish side Athlone Town. During the summer of 2016, he signed for Irish side Wayside Celtic in 2016. Five years later, he signed for Irish side Bluebell United.
