= Piotr Bajdziak =

Polish footballer playing

Personal information
- Date of birth: 4 May 1984 (age 42)
- Place of birth: Łódź, Poland
- Height: 1.81 m (5 ft 11 in)
- Position: Midfielder

Youth career
- ŁKS Łódź
- UKS SMS Łódź
- 2002: Warta Działoszyn
- 2003: UKS SMS Łódź

Senior career*
Years	Team	Apps	(Gls)
2003–2004	Unia Janikowo		
2004	Unia Skierniewice		
2005	RKS Radomsko	13	(1)
2005	Sandviken		
2006	Östersund		
2006	Stal Głowno		
2007	Sligo Rovers	7	(0)
2008	Odra Opole	12	(0)
2008	Czarni Żagań	8	(0)
2009	Włókniarz Konstantynów Łódzki	9	(0)
2009–2012	Boruta Zgierz		

Managerial career
- 2016–2017: Jutrzenka Warta
- 2017–2018: GKS Bełchatów II
- * Club domestic league appearances and goals

Piotr Bajdziak [ˈpjɔtr ˈbai̯d͡ʑak] (born 4 May 1984) is a Polish football manager and former player who played as a midfielder. He played in Sweden for Sandvikens IF and Östersunds FK and later in Ireland for Sligo Rovers, before returning to Poland in 2008.
