= Róbert Klučiar =

Slovak footballer

Personal information
- Date of birth: 2 March 1987 (age 39)
- Place of birth: Banská Bystrica, Czechoslovakia
- Height: 1.82 m (6 ft 0 in)
- Position: Right back

Youth career
- 1996–2005: Dukla Banská Bystrica

Senior career*
Years	Team	Apps	(Gls)
2006–2009	Dukla Banská Bystrica	19	(0)
2009	→ Podbrezová (loan)	4	(0)
2009–2010	Čáslav	5	(0)
2012	Limerick	9	(0)
2013–2017	Hitra		

International career
2007	Slovakia U20	2	(0)
- * Club domestic league appearances and goals

Róbert Klučiar (born 2 March 1987) is a Slovak footballer who played as a defender. He ended his professional career in 2012.

== Limerick ==
In July 2012 Limerick announced the signing of former Slovak under-20 international Róbert Klučiar from Czech side FC Zenit Čáslav. He made his debut for Limerick against SD Galway on 20 July 2012. He played a friendly match against Manchester City on 5 August 2012, in which Limerick lost 0-4. In 2013, he signed for the Norwegian club Hitra, playing in the fifth tier.

== Honours ==
Limerick

- League of Ireland First Division (1): 2012
