= Maxime Vuille =

Swiss footballer (born 1987)

Personal information
- Full name: Maxime Vuille
- Date of birth: 2 November 1987 (age 38)
- Place of birth: Morteau, Switzerland
- Height: 1.79 m (5 ft 10 in)
- Position: Midfielder

Youth career
- 2000–2007: Neuchâtel Xamax

Senior career*
Years	Team	Apps	(Gls)
2008–2009	Neuchâtel Xamax	3	(0)
2010–2014	FC Biel	67	(0)
2014	Shamrock Rovers B	7	(0)
- * Club domestic league appearances and goals

Maxime Vuille (born 2 November 1987) is a Swiss footballer, who last played for League of Ireland club Shamrock Rovers B. Besides Switzerland, he has played in the Republic of Ireland.

== Career ==
The midfielder played four games for Neuchâtel Xamax in the Swiss Super League. On 11 January 2010 left Neuchâtel Xamax after ten years to sign with Challenge League club FC Biel-Bienne.

Vuille made guest appearances for Shamrock Rovers in friendlies against Wolves and QPR in the summer of 2014 at Tallaght Stadium.
