= Ayten Mutlu =

Turkish poet and writer (born 1952)

Ayten Mutlu (born 6 October 1952 Bandırma, Turkey) is a Turkish poet and writer. She graduated from Yıldız Technical University and Istanbul University and graduated from Management faculty of İstanbul University in 1975. She retired from The Central Bank. She was politically active, in the Women rights Movement.

She has published poetry, prose, stories and criticism. She also translated, contemporary poets from English to Turkish that published many of them in periodicals. She translates women poets from Antiquity to now selections from the world over.

She is laureate of price Ibrahim Yildizoglu (1999), price of poem of the international Meeting of the poets of Yalova (2001) and price Sunullah Arısoy (2005)

Master of condensed poem, of the image that illumines and quietly. Her poetry explodes with sound and meaning reflects a struggle within herself, as well as a view of the world in which all horror and beauty are seen at once and often intermingled. Her opposition and political ideas are reflected in her poems but from a lyrical way.

== Works ==
- Dayan Ey Sevdam (Resist Oh My Love, 1984),
- Vaktolur (A Time Comes When…, 1986),
- Seni Özledim (I Missed You, 1990),
- Kül İzi (The Trace of Ash, 1993),
- Denize Doğru (Towards the Sea, 1996),
- Çocuk ve Akşam (Child And Evening, 1999),
- Taş Ayna (Stone Mirror, 2002).
- Yitik Anlam Peşinde (In Search of Lost Meaning, 2004),
- Ateşin Köklerinde (In Roots Of Fire - Selected Poems, 2006)
- Les Yeux d'Istanbul (2014, Translated by Mustafa Balel, Ed. L'Harmattan, Paris)
