= Carel van der Velden =

Dutch retired footballer and coach

Personal information
- Full name: Cornelis Carel van der Velden
- Date of birth: 3 August 1972 (age 54)
- Place of birth: Netherlands
- Position: Midfielder

Senior career*
Years	Team	Apps	(Gls)
198?–1992	FC Wageningen		
1992–1993	SBV Vitesse	1	(0)
1993–1996	FC Den Bosch		
1996–1997	Barnsley	9	(0)
1997–1998	Scarborough Athletic	8	(1)
1998–1999	Rushden & Diamonds	12	(0)
1999–2000	Shelbourne		
2000–2001	Sligo Rovers		
- * Club domestic league appearances and goals

Carel van der Velden (born 3 August 1972) is a Dutch retired footballer who is last known to have worked as head coach of SC Everstein in his home country.

== Career ==
Van der Velden started his senior career with Wageningen. In 1996, he signed for Barnsley in the English Football League First Division, where he made ten appearances and scored zero goals. After that, he played for English clubs Scarborough Athletic and Rushden & Diamonds, and Irish clubs Shelbourne and Sligo Rovers before retiring.

== Honours ==
- League of Ireland Premier Division:
  - Shelbourne – 1999–2000
- FAI Cup:
  - Shelbourne – 2000
