= Krystian Lamberski =

Polish footballer

Personal information
- Date of birth: 23 August 1979 (age 47)
- Place of birth: Wrocław, Poland
- Height: 1.86 m (6 ft 1 in)
- Position: Defender

Senior career*
Years	Team	Apps	(Gls)
1998–2002	Polar Wrocław		
2002–2003	Pogoń Oleśnica		
2003–2004	Górnik Konin	24	(0)
2004–2006	Górnik Polkowice	37	(0)
2006	Waterford	9	(2)
2006–2008	Thyella Patras		
2008–2010	Keravnos Keratea		
2010–2011	Irakleio	22	(2)
2012–2013	Polonia Środa Śląska		
2013–2014	Piast Żerniki (Wrocław)		
2014	Orzeł Prusice		
- * Club domestic league appearances and goals

Krystian Lamberski (born 23 August 1979) is a Polish former professional footballer who played as a defender.

== Career ==
Lamberski started his senior career with Polar Wrocław in the late 1990s. In 2003, he signed for Górnik Konin in the Polish II liga, where he made twenty-six appearances and scored one goal. After that, he played for Polish club Górnik Polkowice, Irish club Waterford, Greek clubs Thyella Patras, Keravnos Keratea, and A.E. Iraklei, Polish clubs Polonia Środa Śląska, Piast Żerniki (Wrocław), and Orzeł Prusice before retiring in 2014.
