= Marcin Szymański (footballer) =

Polish footballer

Personal information
- Date of birth: 1 July 1972 (age 53)
- Place of birth: Wrocław, Poland
- Height: 1.85 m (6 ft 1 in)
- Position: Defender

Senior career*
Years	Team	Apps	(Gls)
1992–2000	Śląsk Wrocław	188	(2)
2000–2004	Górnik Polkowice	62	(1)
2004–2005	Salthill Devon		
2005	Galway United	9	(0)
- * Club domestic league appearances and goals

Marcin Szymański (born 1 July 1972) is a Polish former professional footballer who played as a defender.

== Career ==
Szymanski started his senior career with Śląsk Wrocław in 1992. He made 188 league appearances and scored two goals. After that, he played for Polish club Górnik Polkowice, Irish clubs Salthill Devon and Galway United before retiring in 2005.

== Honours ==
Śląsk Wrocław

- II liga, group I: 1994–95

Górnik Polkowice

- II liga: 2002–03
