= Luciano Masiello =

Italian footballer

Personal information
- Date of birth: 2 January 1951 (age 75)
- Place of birth: Benevento, Italy
- Height: 1.70 m (5 ft 7 in)
- Position: Winger

Youth career
- 1962–1967: Charlton Athletic

Senior career*
Years	Team	Apps	(Gls)
1967–1972	Charlton Athletic	8	(1)
	→ Athlone Town (loan)	12	(6)
1972–1974	→ Almas Roma (loan)	64	(12)
1974	→ Lazio (loan)	1	
1974–1977	Frosinone	80	(12)
1977–1978	Francavilla	34	(8)
Total		201	(39)

Managerial career
- 1982–1983: Andover F.C.
- 1983–1984: Woking
- 1984–1985: Bromley
- * Club domestic league appearances and goals

Luciano Masiello (born 2 January 1951) is an Italian former professional footballer who played as a winger in England, Ireland and Italy.

== Playing career ==
Masiello joined Charlton Athletic as a school boy in 1962 and came through the youth teams and reserves until he made his first team debut in a friendly against Dutch team FC Den Bosch in 1968, another first team outing followed against a very strong Italian under 21 team in a friendly at the valley until making his full first team league debut in December 1969 against Norwich City winning 3–0. He went on to make eight league appearances and two substitute appearances for Charlton Athletic and scored one goal against West Bromwich Albion in a league cup match at the Hawthorns. He had a loan spell with Athlone Town in Ireland, playing in the FIA league of Ireland Cup Final

He played in Italy for six seasons making 179 appearances for Almas Roma, Lazio, Frosinone and Francavilla.

== Managerial career ==
Masiello coached for a number of years in Italy before returning to England. Luciano had spells as manager at Andover F.C. and was a player-coach at Woking and Bromley He also discovered the talent of Emeka Nwajiobi.

Masiello decided to leave football as his family and businesses grew. He always had a passion for food so he bought and sold a number of restaurants until his retirement in 2015.
