= Bogdan Oprea =

Romanian footballer

Personal information
- Full name: Bogdan Oprea
- Date of birth: 29 September 1982 (age 44)
- Place of birth: Bucharest, Romania
- Height: 6 ft 0 in (1.83 m)
- Position: Midfielder

Senior career*
| Years | Team | Apps | (Gls) |
| 2004–2005 | FC Rapid II București | 3 | (0) |
| 2005–2006 | FC Astra Ploieşti | 19 | (2) |
| 2007 | UCD AFC | 5 | (1) |
| 2008–2013 | FC Victoria Brăneşti | 62 | (21) |
| 2013–2014 | FC Voluntari | | |
| 2014–2015 | CS Balotești | 24 | (3) |
| 2015–2016 | Juventus București | | |
- * Club domestic league appearances and goals as of 2016-07-02

Bogdan Oprea (born 29 September 1982), is a Romanian footballer.

== Career ==
He was a youth player at FC Rapid București, but never got a game with the main squad, he played for second side. He later moved onto SC Astra Ploieşti for one season, before joining UCD in early 2007. He was released by UCD in July 2007 and returned to Romania.
