= Vinny McCarthy =

Scottish footballer

Personal information
- Full name: Vinny McCarthy
- Date of birth: 24 September 1955 (age 71)
- Place of birth: Glasgow, Scotland
- Position: Winger

Senior career*
Years	Team	Apps	(Gls)
1976–87	Waterford United	242	(42)
1976	→ Utah Golden Spikers (loan)		
1979	→ Los Angeles Skyhawks (loan)		
1987–88	Shamrock Rovers	20	(2)
1988–91	Waterford United		
1991–92	Cobh Ramblers	36	(0)
1992–93	Waterford United	15	(2)
- * Club domestic league appearances and goals

Vinny McCarthy (born 24 September 1955 ) is a former Scottish soccer player.

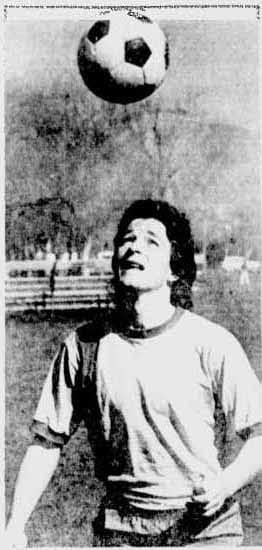
1976 Utah Golden Spikers

Vinny McCarthy’s football journey began around the age of 10 or 11, playing in primary school. By his teenage years, he was competing seriously with the Hill Amateurs in Glasgow, a 16-a-side team that served as the nursery squad for Partick Thistle.

After two years there, the manager Dave McParland was replaced by Bertie Auld, the former Celtic star. Auld wanted to restructure the squad, and Vinny was let go. McParland, recognizing his talent, recommended him to Tommy Docherty, then the Manchester United manager.

In 1975, at just 20 years old, Vinny found himself playing a season with the Manchester United reserves. From there, new opportunities opened up: Docherty’s connections led to offers from both Durban City in South Africa and Waterford in Ireland. South Africa, however, was a difficult prospect due to apartheid, so in February 1976 Vinny chose Waterford.

By the time he arrived, the League of Ireland season was already wrapping up. With the help of John McSeveny, who had contacts in the U.S., Vinny headed across the Atlantic that spring to join the Utah Golden Spikers in the American Soccer League. He spent four months there before returning to Waterford.

The following year, in 1977, he was back in the States with the LA Skyhawks for another four-month stint.

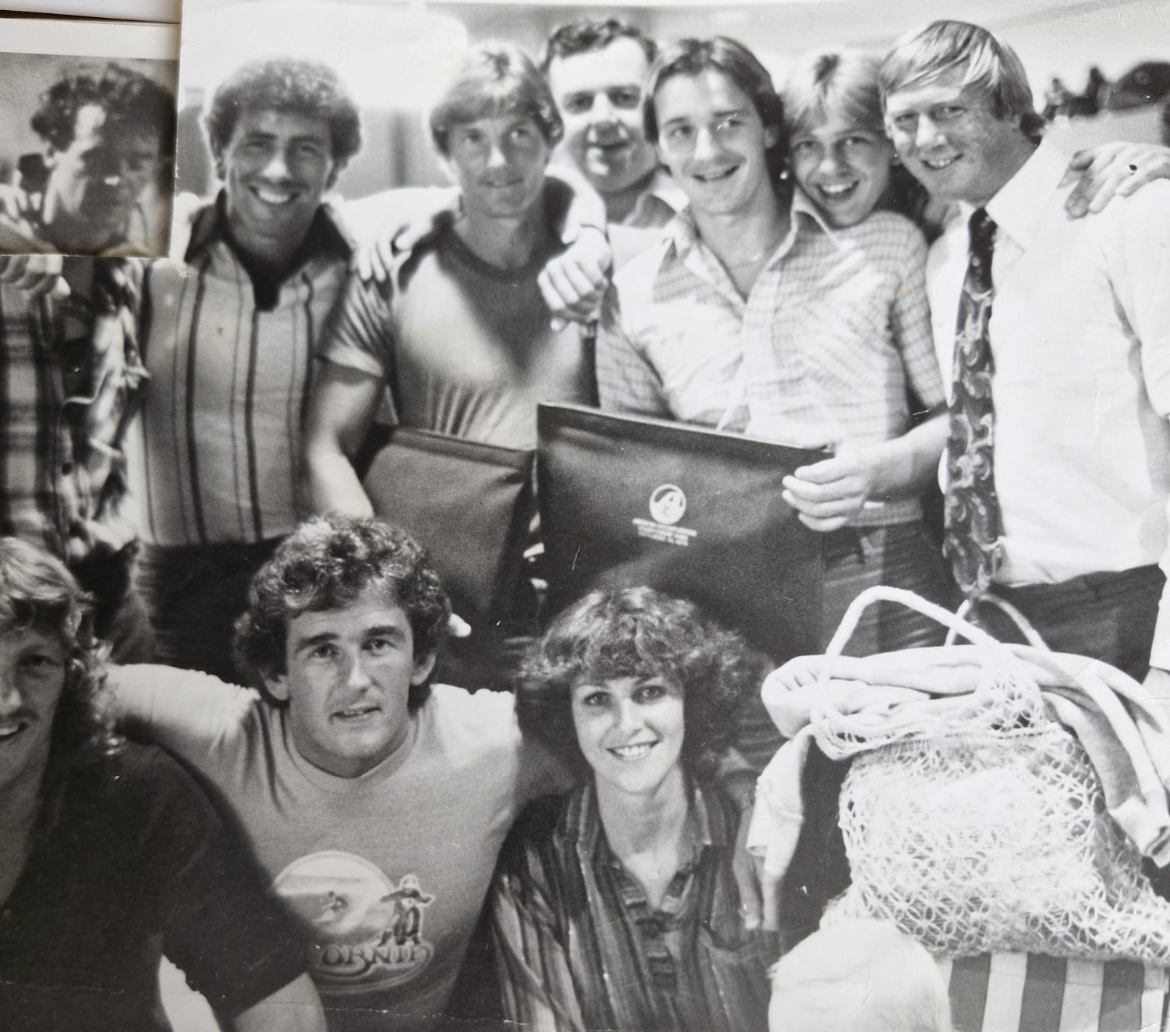
Vinny leaving L.A after another successful season stateside

Then in January 1978, his career reached a highlight: he was selected for the League of Ireland XI under manager Johnny Giles. They played in Boca Juniors’ stadium, where a young Diego Maradona came on as a substitute. After the match, Vinny swapped jerseys with Ricky Villa — a moment he would never forget.

In 1979 he returned to Waterford, reaching the Cup Final, though they were beaten by Dundalk. Redemption came the next year, when Waterford defeated St. Patrick’s Athletic to win the league title under manager Tommy Jackson.

In 1986, Vinny spent a season with Shamrock Rovers before returning once more to Waterford. In 1987, he helped the club win the First Division title, securing promotion back to the Premier Division of Irish football.

He played on until the 1992–93 season, when a torn cruciate ligament in his left knee brought his professional career to an end. Still, his love for the game never faded — in the years that followed, Vinny gave back to football as a coach with Ferrybank FC, passing on his career experience. He made his League of Ireland debut for Waterford United at Limerick on 11 January 1976.

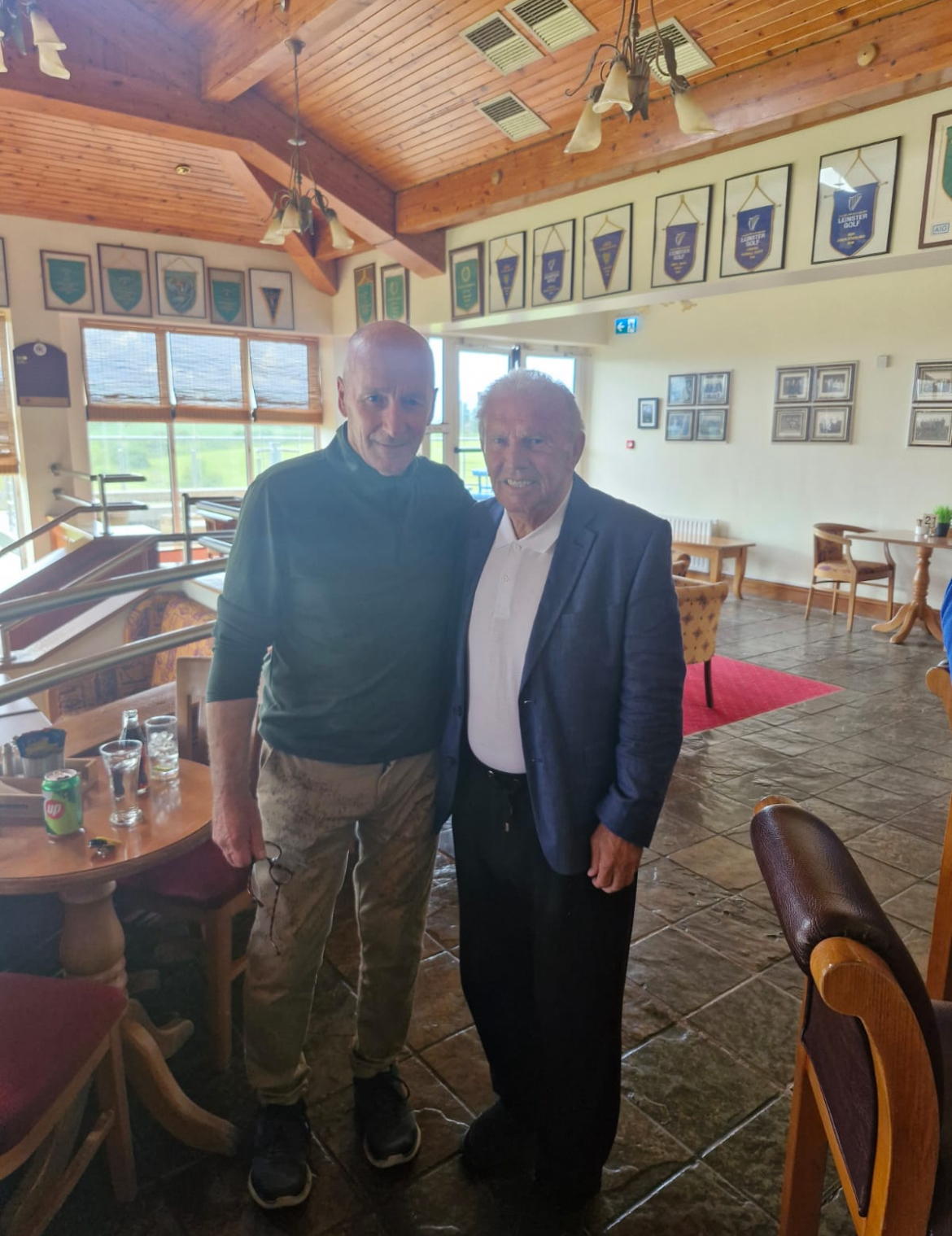
Johnny Giles & Vinny McCarthy meet again 46 years after Argentina V League of Ireland

Argentina - League of Ireland 3:1 20 APR 1978, A v League

Goals ARG: Ricky Villa, Oscar Ortiz, Leopoldo Luque

LEA: Synan Braddish

Argentina (César Luis Menotti) Ubaldo Fillol, Luis Galván, Jorge Olguin, Daniel Passarella, Alberto Tarantini, Ossie Ardiles, Americo Gallego, Oscar Ortiz (Daniel Bertoni), Ricky Villa (Diego Maradona), Rene Houseman, Leopoldo Luque League of Ireland Eamonn Gregg, Johnny Giles (McCarthy), Bobby Tambling, Synan Braddish, J Clarke, J Fulman (Al Finucane), J Hulmes (C Mucklan), McGuiness, A Patterson, N Synnott, Ray Treacy Venue Buenos Aires

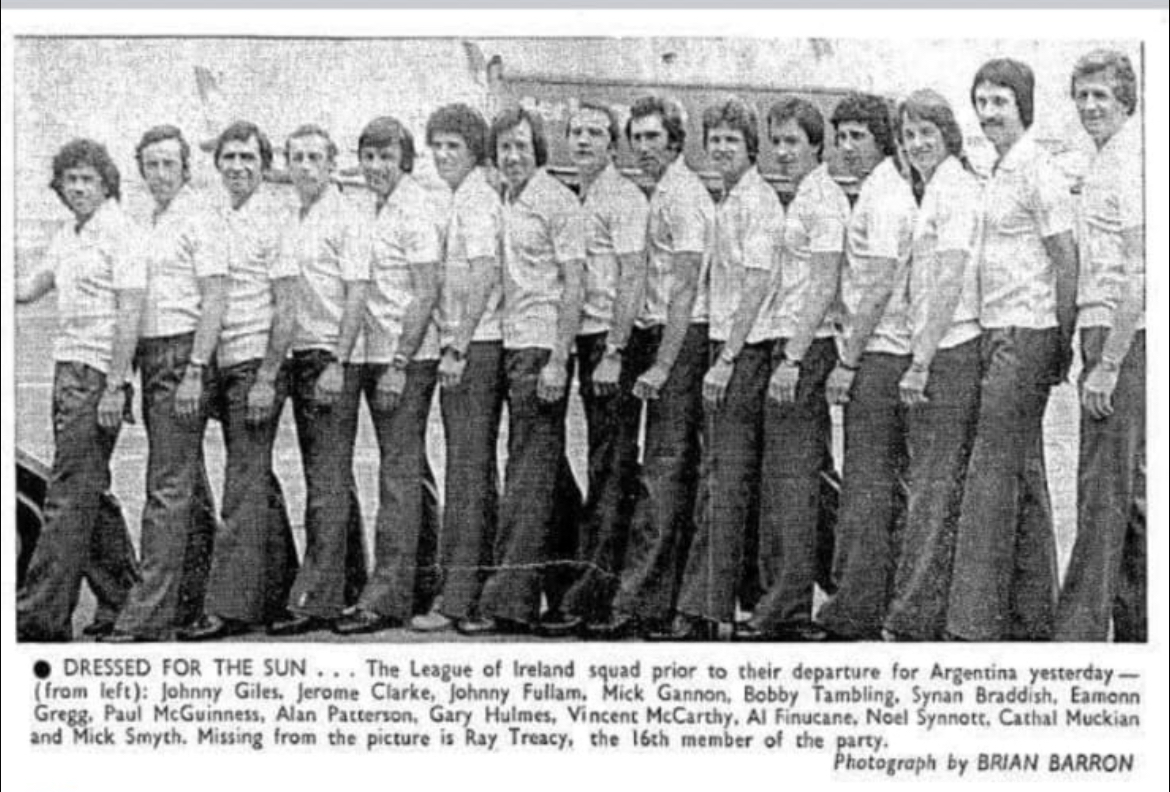
League of Ireland squad prior to departing for Argentina (April 1978)

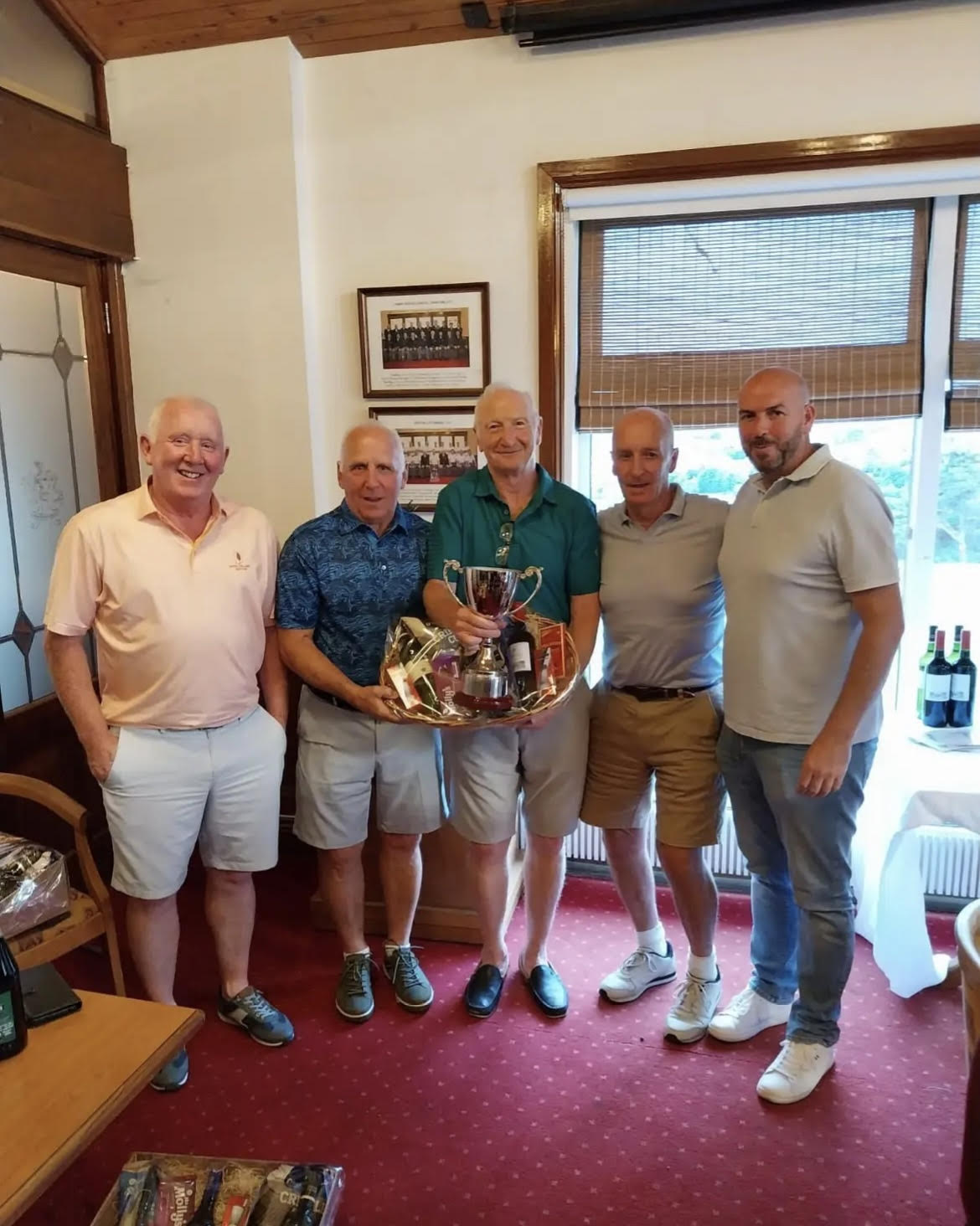
Still winning! Eamon Coady, Ger O'Mahony & Vinny McCarthy who won the FAI Cup together in 1980

McCarthy signed for Shamrock Rovers in July 1987.

He made a scoring debut in a League Cup game in Longford on 23 August.

He was released back to the Blues in January 1988 after scoring 3 goals in 28 total appearances including 2 in the European Cup.

McCarthy represented the League of Ireland at Inter-League level.

== Honours ==
- FAI Cup: 1
  - Waterford United 1980
- League of Ireland First Division: 1
  - Waterford United 1989/90
