= 2009 A Championship =

Newstalk A Championship
- Season: 2009
- Champions: Shamrock Rovers A
- Promoted: Salthill Devon

The 2009 A Championship was the second season of the A Championship in Ireland. The season was sponsored by Newstalk. The league featured 18 teams. Shamrock Rovers A were the champions while the runners up, Salthill Devon, were promoted to the First Division.

Location of teams in 2009 A Championship

== Overview ==
18 teams participated in the 2009 A Championship. 12 of these were the reserve teams of League of Ireland clubs. The 2008 champions UCD A and Limerick 37 A did not enter teams for the 2009 season. They were replaced by Sporting Fingal A and Dundalk A. The six non-reserve teams included Salthill Devon and Tullamore Town, both of whom played in the 2008 season. Cobh Ramblers had been relegated from the 2008 Premier Division but were demoted directly to the A Championship after being refused a First Division licence. Castlebar Celtic, F.C. Carlow and Tralee Dynamos were making their debut at senior national level. They were the first clubs from their respective counties of Mayo, Carlow and Kerry to play at this level.

The regular season started on 4 April and was completed by early November. The format saw the 18 teams split into two groups of nine, divided roughly into southern and northern groups. The two groups used a traditional round-robin format. The two group winners, Shamrock Rovers A and Salthill Devon, then played off in a final. Shamrock Rovers emerged as champions. As the highest placed non-reserve team, Salthill Devon also qualified for a promotion/relegation play-off. However they were subsequently promoted directly to the 2010 First Division after their opponents, Kildare County, withdrew from the League of Ireland before the play-off could be played.

== Group 1 ==
=== Teams ===
Team	Base	Stadium
Castlebar Celtic	Castlebar	Celtic Park
Derry City A	Derry	Brandywell Stadium
Drogheda United A	Drogheda	United Park
Dundalk A	Dundalk	Oriel Park
Finn Harps A	Ballybofey	Finn Park
Galway United A	Galway	Athenry
Salthill Devon	Salthill	Drom Soccer Park
Sligo Rovers A	Sligo	Showgrounds
Tullamore Town	Tullamore	Leah Victoria Park

=== Final table ===
Pos	Team	Pld	W	D	L	GF	GA	GD	Pts	Promotion
1	Salthill Devon (P)	16	11	3	2	37	17	+20	36	Promoted to First Division
2	Drogheda United A	16	10	2	4	39	18	+21	32	
3	Finn Harps A	16	9	3	4	37	17	+20	30	
4	Castlebar Celtic	16	8	1	7	31	31	0	25	
5	Derry City A	16	7	2	7	32	21	+11	23	
6	Tullamore Town	16	5	3	8	13	19	−6	18	
7	Dundalk A	16	5	3	8	24	34	−10	18	
8	Sligo Rovers A	16	4	3	9	16	32	−16	15	
9	Galway United A	16	1	4	11	8	48	−40	7	

Source: loi.ie
Rules for classification: 1) points; 2) goal difference; 3) number of goals scored. Note: Reserve teams are ineligible for promotion.
(P) Promoted

=== Results ===
Home \ Away	CAS	DER	DRO	DUN	FHA	GAL	SAL	SLI	TUL
Castlebar Celtic		1–2	2–3	5–0	2–5	3–0	3–2	3–1	0–0
Derry City A	6–1		0–1	3–1	1–1	6–0	1–3	2–0	1–2
Drogheda United A	1–2	1–0		1–2 (Note: Originally reported 1-2, www.loi.ie has 1-3.)	3–1	10–0	2–2	1–3	3–2
Dundalk A	2–3	2–5	2–1		3–3	4–1	0–1	2–1	1–1
Finn Harps A	5–1	3–0	1–2	2–0		3–0 (Note: The match was awarded to Finn Harps A with a score of 3-0 due to Galway United A failing to show up.)	3–1	0–0	0–1
Galway United A	0–3 (Note: The match was awarded to Castlebar Celtic with a score of 3-0 due to Galway United A failing to show up.)	1–1	0–3 (Note: The match was awarded to Drogheda United A with a score of 0–3 due to Galway United A being unable to field a team.)	1–1	0–4		1–3	0–0	0–0
Salthill Devon	3–0	2–0	1–1	3–0 (Note: The match was awarded to Salthill Devon with a score of 0–3 due to Dundalk A failing to travel to the match.)	2–1	4–2		3–3	2–0
Sligo Rovers A	1–0	1–4	0–5	1–3	1–3	3–1 (Note: Originally reported 3-1, www.loi.ie has 2-1, Galway United official site has 3-1.)	0–1		1–0
Tullamore Town	0–2	1–0	0–1	2–1	0–2	0–1	0–4	4–0	

Source: loi.ie
Legend: Blue = home team win; Yellow = draw; Red = away team win.

== Group 2 ==
=== Teams ===
Team	Base	Stadium
Bohemians A	Phibsborough	AUL Complex
Bray Wanderers A	Bray	Jackson Park
F.C. Carlow	Ballon	The Valley
Cobh Ramblers	Cobh	St Colman's Park
Cork City A	Cork	Turner's Cross
Sporting Fingal A	Fingal	ALSAA Sports Complex
St Patrick's Athletic A	Inchicore	Richmond Park
Shamrock Rovers A	Tallaght	Tallaght Stadium
Tralee Dynamos	Tralee	Cahermoneen

=== Final table ===
Pos	Team	Pld	W	D	L	GF	GA	GD	Pts	Qualification
1	Shamrock Rovers A (C)	16	11	3	2	29	10	+19	36	A Championship winners
2	Bohemians A	16	10	1	5	26	21	+5	31	
3	Bray Wanderers A	16	8	4	4	30	21	+9	28	
4	Sporting Fingal A	16	8	2	6	32	21	+11	26	
5	Tralee Dynamos	16	8	1	7	20	21	−1	25	
6	Cork City A	16	7	3	6	20	19	+1	24	
7	St Patrick's Athletic A	16	3	6	7	16	18	−2	15	
8	F.C. Carlow	16	3	3	10	14	35	−21	12	
9	Cobh Ramblers	16	1	3	12	11	32	−21	6	

Source: loi.ie
Rules for classification: 1) points; 2) goal difference; 3) number of goals scored. Note: Reserve teams are ineligible for promotion.
(C) Champions

=== Results ===
Home \ Away	BOH	BRW	COB	COR	CAR	StP	SHA	SFI	TRA
Bohemians A		0–3 (Note: The match originally finished 4–0, but it was later awarded 3-0 to Bray Wanderers A due to Bohemians A having fielded an ineligible player.)	3–1	1–5	2–1	2–0	2–3	0–0	0–1
Bray Wanderers A	0–2		4–2	5–0	4–0	2–2	0–1	1–7	1–0
Cobh Ramblers	0–1	2–5		0–2	0–0	1–0	1–1	1–4	0–1
Cork City A	0–1	0–0	2–0		2–0	1–0	0–2	3–0	2–1
F.C. Carlow	0–5	1–2	1–0	1–1		2–0	0–3	2–4	3–1
St Patrick's Athletic A	4–0	2–0	1–1	0–0	3–3		0–0	2–0	2–2
Shamrock Rovers A	1–2	1–1	2–0	1–0	3–0	1–0 (Note: Originally reported 1-0, www.loi.ie has 2-0, Shamrock Rovers official site has 1-0.)		2–1	5–0
Sporting Fingal A	1–3	0–0	2–1	6–2	2–0	2–0	1–2		1–2
Tralee Dynamos	1–2	1–2	3–1	1–0	3–0	1–0	2–1	0–1	

Source: loi.ie
Legend: Blue = home team win; Yellow = draw; Red = away team win.

== Final ==
31 October 2009	Salthill Devon	0 – 1	Shamrock Rovers A	Drom Soccer Park
14:00 GMT			Cowan 90+7'

== See also ==
- 2009 League of Ireland Premier Division
- 2009 League of Ireland First Division
- 2009 League of Ireland Cup
