= League of Ireland U19 Division =

- Country: Republic of Ireland (20 teams)
- Other club from: Northern Ireland (1 team)
- Confederation: UEFA
- Number of clubs: 21
- Domestic cup: FAI Youth Cup
- League cup(s): Dr Tony O'Neill Cup; Enda McGuill Cup
- International cup: UEFA Youth League
- Current champions: Shamrock Rovers U19 (2nd title)
- Most championships: Cork City (7)
- Website: www.sseairtricityleague.ie

The League of Ireland U19 Division is the under-19 division of the League of Ireland. The current division is the successor of earlier U21 and U20 divisions. Like the Premier Division and First Division, the U19 Division is currently sponsored by Airtricity and as a result it is also known as the SSE Airtricity U19 League. The earlier U21 and U20 divisions were sponsored by Eircom and as a result were referred to as the Eircom U21 League or the Eircom U20 League. The division is also sometimes referred to as the Dr Tony O'Neill League because the winners are awarded the Dr Tony O'Neill Cup. In 2016 Cork City became the first team to represent the division in the UEFA Youth League.

== History ==
=== Eircom U21 League ===
The inaugural season of the U21 division took place in 2000–01 and St Patrick's Athletic finished as the first champions. In 2001–02 Waterford United won the title before Cork City won their first title in 2002–03. City then retained the title in 2003–04. UCD subsequently won three of four remaining titles during the U21 era. As well as featuring the youth teams of contemporary League of Ireland clubs, the division also featured the representative teams of junior leagues such as the Kerry District League, the Mayo Association Football League and the Sligo/Leitrim League. In 2004 Sligo/Leitrim reached the final of the Enda McGuill Cup. In addition to featuring UCD, the division also featured three other university teams – NUI Galway, the University of Limerick and Dublin University. The division was also used by the League of Ireland as an avenue for future members of its senior divisions. Both Salthill Devon and Mervue United began their League of Ireland careers in the U21 division. In 2003 Mervue United were Enda McGuill Cup finalists and in 2006 Salthill Devon became the first club to win the Dr Tony O'Neill Cup without having a team in the senior divisions. Letterkenny Rovers entered a team in 2006. In addition to competing for the Dr Tony O'Neill Cup and the Enda McGuill Cup, teams in the U21 division also played in several other competitions including pre-season tournaments in 2006 and 2007 and a futsal league in 2007 which was won by Shamrock Rovers. This latter competition evolved into the FAI Futsal Cup.

=== Eircom U20 League ===
In 2008, as part of a restructuring of the League of Ireland that also saw the introduction of the A Championship, the U21 division was relaunched as a U20 division. The new division featured the youth teams of the 22 clubs in the Premier Division and First Division plus four other teams – F.C. Carlow, Kilkenny City, Salthill Devon and Mervue United. Cork City were the first U20 champions in 2008–09 followed by UCD in 2009. In 2010 Andrew Myler guided Shamrock Rovers to their first title.

=== Airtricity U19 League ===
The Under-19 version of the competition began in 2011. At the start of the U19 era Cork City established themselves as the dominant team, winning the Dr Tony O'Neill Cup four seasons out of five and winning the Enda McGuill Cup on three occasions. In 2016 Cork City also became the first team to represent the division in the UEFA Youth League. EA Sports reached a sponsorship agreement to become title sponsor for all of the National Underage Leagues in 2021, including the Under-19 league. In 2022, a rule change saw the introduction of overage players to the league.

=== Return to U20 league ===
In 2024, the league returned to an Under-20 competition when the League of Ireland (LOI) introduced the EA Sports LOI Academy MU20 League to replace the existing MU19 league.

== Format ==
During the U21 and U20 eras teams playing in the division were divided into four regionalised groups, more or less corresponding to North and South Leinster, Munster and Connacht/Ulster. The top two teams from each group then qualified for the quarter-finals and the remainder of the competition was decided on a knock-out basis. Between 2011–12 and 2013–14 teams playing in the division were divided into the three groups. One of these groups, the Elite Division, was a national division. The remaining teams were divided into Southern and Northern divisions. During these three seasons the winners of the Elite Division were awarded the Dr Tony O'Neill Cup. The 2014–15 season saw the introduction of two regional divisions known as the Northern Elite Division and the Southern Elite Division and a play-off system was again used to decide the overall champions. The 2015 season featured three regional groups simply numbered one to three. The 2016 season saw the return of the Northern Elite Division and the Southern Elite Division format.

== Teams ==
=== Northern Elite Division ===
Locations of Northern Elite Division Teams

| Team | Location | Stadium |
|---|---|---|
| Athlone Town U19 | Athlone | Lissywollen |
| Bohemians U19 | Phibsborough | IT Blanchardstown |
| Derry City U19 | Derry | Brandywell Stadium |
| Drogheda United U19 | Drogheda | United Park |
| Dundalk U19 | Dundalk | Oriel Park |
| Finn Harps U19 | Ballybofey | Killygordon |
| Longford Town U19 | Longford | Strokestown Road |
| Monaghan United Cavan Football Partnership U19 | Monaghan | Gortakeegan |
| Shelbourne U19 | Drumcondra, Dublin | AUL Complex |
| Sligo Rovers U19 | Sligo | The Showgrounds |
| St Patrick's Athletic U19 | Inchicore | IT Blanchardstown |

=== Southern Elite Division ===
| Team | Hometown/Suburb | Ground |
|---|---|---|
| Bray Wanderers U19 | Bray | Carlisle Grounds |
| Cabinteely U19 | Cabinteely | AUL Complex |
| Cobh Ramblers U19 | Cobh | St. Colman's Park |
| Cork City U19 | Cork | Bishopstown Stadium |
| Galway United U19 | Galway | Eamonn Deacy Park |
| Limerick U19 | Limerick | Jackman Park |
| Kerry U19 | Tralee | Mounthawk Park |
| Shamrock Rovers U19 | Tallaght | Tallaght Stadium |
| Wexford Youths U19 | Crossabeg | Ferrycarrig Park |
| Waterford United U19 | Waterford | Waterford RSC |
| UCD U19 | Belfield, Dublin | UCD Bowl |

== Dr Tony O'Neill Cup ==
The main league championship trophy is named after Dr Tony O'Neill, the former general manager of University College Dublin A.F.C. O'Neill was a founding member of the Irish Universities Football Union, a former general secretary of the FAI and a member of various UEFA committees. He also served as Director of Sport at UCD and was credited with revitalising sport at the university following the introduction of a scholarship scheme. This competition should not be confused with the other Dr Tony O'Neill Cup, a national competition organised by the FAI for schools teams.

| Season | Winner | Score | Runners-up | Venue |
|---|---|---|---|---|
| 2000–01 | St Patrick's Athletic U21 | 1–0 | Longford Town U21 | |
| 2001–02 | Waterford United U21 | 2–2 ^{(Note 1)} | Athlone Town U21 | |
| 2002–03 | Cork City U21 | 2–1 | Bohemians U21 | |
| 2003 | Cork City U21 | 2–1 | St Patrick's Athletic U21 | |
| 2004 | UCD U21 | 3–2 | Cork City U21 | |
| 2005 | UCD U21 | 2–1 | Shelbourne U21 | |
| 2005–06 | Salthill Devon U21 | 2–1 | Cork City U21 | |
| 2007 | UCD U21 | 0–0 ^{(Note 2)} | St Patrick's Athletic U21 | Belfield Park |
| 2008–09 | Cork City U20 | 1–0 | Bohemians U20 | O’Shea Park, Blarney |
| 2009 | UCD U20 | 5–3 | Salthill Devon U20 | UCD Bowl |
| 2010 | Shamrock Rovers U20 | 1–1 ^{(Note 3)} | Bohemians U20 | Tallaght Stadium |
| 2011–12 | Cork City U19 | ^{(Note 4)} | Shamrock Rovers U19 | n/a |
| 2012–13 | Cork City U19 | ^{(Note 4)} | Shelbourne U19 | n/a |
| 2013–14 | Cork City U19 | ^{(Note 4)} | Shamrock Rovers U19 | n/a |
| 2014–15 | St Patrick's Athletic U19 | 3–2 | Derry City U19 | Maginn Park, Buncrana |

Notes

- ^1 Waterford United U21 won 5–4 on penalties.
- ^2 UCD U21 won 4–2 on penalties.
- ^3 Shamrock Rovers U20 won 6−5 on penalties.
- ^4 Title decided using league format only. No play-off final.

== Enda McGuill Cup ==
The Enda McGuill Memorial Cup is the division's league cup. It is named after Enda McGuill, a former chairman of Dundalk F.C. and a former president of the League of Ireland.

| Season | Winner | Score | Runners-up | Venue |
|---|---|---|---|---|
| 2001–02 | Waterford United U21 | 0–0 ^{(Note 1)} | Shelbourne U21 | |
| 2002–03 | Longford Town U21 | 4–2 | Mervue United U21 | |
| 2003 | Shelbourne U21 | 4–3 | St Patrick's Athletic U21 | |
| 2004 | Cork City U21 | 3–0 | Sligo/Leitrim League | |
| 2005 | Bray Wanderers U21 | 1–1 ^{(Note 2)} | St Patrick's Athletic U21 | |
| 2006 | Cork City U21 | 1–0 | Kildare County U21 | |
| 2007 | Derry City U21 | 1–0 | Bray Wanderers U21 | |
| 2011–12 | Cork City U19 | 3–2 | Dundalk U19 | Oriel Park |
| 2012–13 | Cork City U19 | 3–1 | Shelbourne U19 | Turners Cross |
| 2013–14 | Cobh Ramblers U19 | 3–2 | Drogheda United U19 | St Colman's Park |
| 2014–15 | UCD U19 | 3–2 | Derry City U19 | UCD Bowl |
| 2016 | Cork City U19 | 2–0 | St Patrick's Athletic U19 | Turners Cross |
| 2017 | Dundalk U19 | 2-1 a.e.t. | UCD U19 | Richmond Park |
| 2018 | Bohemians U19 | 2-1 | St Patrick's Athletic U19 | UCD Bowl |
| 2019 | Shamrock Rovers U19 | 4–1 | Bohemians U19 | Dalymount Park |
| 2020 | Cancelled due to COVID-19 pandemic in the Republic of Ireland | | | |
| 2021 | Derry City U19 | 1–1 a.e.t. ^{(Note 3)} | Bohemians U19 | Ryan McBride Brandywell Stadium |
| 2022 | Bohemians U19 | 1–0 | St Patrick's Athletic U19 | Dalymount Park |
| 2023 | Shamrock Rovers U19s | 2-1 | Galway United U19s | Eamonn Deacy Park |
| 2024 | UCD U20s | 2-1 a.e.t. | Sligo Rovers U20s | UCD Bowl |
| 2025 | Shelbourne U20s | 2-0 | UCD U20s | Carlisle Grounds |

Notes

- ^1 Waterford United U21 won 4–2 on penalties.
- ^2 Bray Wanderers U21 won 4–3 on penalties.
- ^3 Derry City U19 won 5–4 on penalties.

== League of Ireland U19 Champions ==
| Year | Winner | Runner up | Result | Venue |
|---|---|---|---|---|
| 2015 | Cork City | Limerick | 2-1 | Markets Field |
| 2016 | UCD | Galway United | 4-1 | UCD Bowl |
| 2017 | Bohemians | St Patrick's Athletic | 1-0 | Dalymount Park |
| 2018 | Bohemians | Shamrock Rovers | 1-0 | Tallaght Stadium |
| 2019 | Waterford | Galway United | 3–1 | Eamonn Deacy Park |
| 2020 | St Patrick's Athletic | Bohemians | 2–1 (a.e.t.) | UCD Bowl |
| 2021 | Shamrock Rovers | Sligo Rovers | 2-1 | Tallaght Stadium |

== Player of the season ==
| Year | Winner | Team |
|---|---|---|
| 2017 | John Martin | Waterford |
| 2018 | Andy Lyons | Bohemians |
| 2023 | Cian Curtis | Shamrock Rovers |
| 2024 | Bridel Bosakani | Drogheda United |

== Selected former teams ==
The vast majority of teams that have competed in the division have been the youth teams of League of Ireland clubs. The following clubs and representative teams have also competed without ever having entered a team in either the Premier Division or the First Division.

| Team | Hometown/Suburb | Years |
|---|---|---|
| F.C. Carlow | County Carlow | 2008, 2011–12 |
| Castlebar Celtic | Castlebar | 2007 |
| Dublin University | Trinity College Dublin | |
| Fanad United | Fanad | 2011–13 |
| Garda | | 2002– |
| NUI Galway | NUI Galway | |
| Letterkenny Rovers | Letterkenny | 2006–07, 2012–15 |
| University of Limerick | Limerick | 2003– |
| Mayo Association Football League | | |
| Mullingar Athletic | Mullingar | 2002– |
| Sligo/Leitrim League | | –2005 |
| Tralee Dynamos | Tralee | |
