= 2010 A Championship =

Newstalk A Championship
- Season: 2010
- Champions: UCD A

The 2010 A Championship was the third season of the A Championship in Ireland. The season was sponsored by Newstalk. The league featured 18 teams. UCD A were the champions, winning the title for a second time while Bohemians A finished as runners up.

Location of teams in 2010 A Championship

== Group 1 ==
=== Teams ===
Team	Base	Stadium
Castlebar Celtic	Castlebar	Celtic Park
Bohemians A	Phibsborough	AUL Complex
Drogheda United A	Drogheda	United Park
Dundalk A	Dundalk	Oriel Park
Finn Harps A	Ballybofey	Finn Park
Shelbourne A	Drumcondra	Tolka Park
Sporting Fingal A	Fingal	ALSAA Sports Complex
Sligo Rovers A	Sligo	Showgrounds
Tullamore Town	Tullamore	Leah Victoria Park

=== Final table ===
Pos	Team	Pld	W	D	L	GF	GA	GD	Pts	Qualification
1	Bohemians A (A)	16	12	1	3	40	14	+26	37	Qualification for A Championship play-off
2	Sporting Fingal A	16	11	3	2	39	20	+19	36	
3	Dundalk A	16	8	2	6	34	31	+3	26	
4	Sligo Rovers A	16	7	1	8	26	28	−2	22	
5	Finn Harps A	16	6	2	8	24	31	−7	20	
6	Shelbourne A	16	6	2	8	19	32	−13	20	
7	Castlebar Celtic	16	4	4	8	30	35	−5	16	
8	Tullamore Town	16	4	3	9	18	33	−15	15	
9	Drogheda United A	16	3	4	9	24	30	−6	13	

Source: loi.ie
Rules for classification: 1) points; 2) goal difference; 3) number of goals scored. Note: Reserve teams are ineligible for promotion.
(A) Advance to a further round

=== Results ===
Home \ Away	BOH	CAS	DRO	DUN	FHA	SHB	SLI	SFI	TUL
Bohemians A		0–1	1–0	3–1	3–1	2–1	4–1	3–1	5–0
Castlebar Celtic	0–4		3–3	3–6	3–0	1–2	5–0	1–3	4–0
Drogheda United A	0–3	0–0 (Note: Drogheda United A v Castlebar Celtic was not played and was awarded 0-0.)		0–3	5–0	6–3	0–0	2–3	4–1
Dundalk A	2–1	2–2	2–1		4–0	4–0	3–0 (Note: The match was awarded 3-0 to Dundalk A after Sligo Rovers A failed to show up.)	0–4	2–1
Finn Harps A	1–2	4–1	2–0	6–1		0–3	2–1	2–1	1–1
Shelbourne A	0–4	3–2	1–1	2–0	2–0		0–3 (Note: The match was awarded 3-0 to Sligo Rovers A after Shelbourne A could not field a team.)	1–4	0–0
Sligo Rovers A	2–3	3–2	4–1	3–1	1–0	2–0		1–2	2–0
Sporting Fingal A	2–1	1–1	2–0	2–2	2–2	3–0	3–2		3–2
Tullamore Town	1–1	4–1	2–1	3–1	1–3	0–1	2–1	0–3	

Source: loi.ie
Legend: Blue = home team win; Yellow = draw; Red = away team win.

== Group 2 ==
=== Teams ===
Team	Base	Stadium
Bray Wanderers A	Bray	Jackson Park
F.C. Carlow	Ballon	The Valley
Cobh Ramblers	Cobh	St Colman's Park
Galway United A	Galway	Athenry
Limerick A	Limerick	Riverside Park
St Patrick's Athletic A	Inchicore	Richmond Park
Shamrock Rovers A	Tallaght	Tallaght Stadium
Tralee Dynamos	Tralee	Cahermoneen
UCD A	Belfield	UCD Bowl

=== Final table ===
Pos	Team	Pld	W	D	L	GF	GA	GD	Pts	Qualification
1	UCD A (C, A)	16	12	3	1	47	6	+41	39	Qualification for A Championship play-off
2	Cobh Ramblers (A)	16	9	2	5	27	19	+8	29	Qualification for promotion/relegation play-off
3	St Patrick's Athletic A	16	8	2	6	25	21	+4	26	
4	Shamrock Rovers A	16	7	4	5	31	17	+14	25	
5	F.C. Carlow	16	7	4	5	25	20	+5	25	
6	Limerick A	16	6	3	7	16	20	−4	21	
7	Tralee Dynamos	16	5	3	8	19	34	−15	18	
8	Bray Wanderers A	16	5	2	9	15	30	−15	17	
9	Galway United A	16	1	1	14	10	48	−38	4	

Source: loi.ie
Rules for classification: 1) points; 2) goal difference; 3) number of goals scored. Note: Reserve teams are ineligible for promotion.
(A) Advance to a further round; (C) Champions

=== Results ===
Home \ Away	BRW	COB	CAR	GAL	LIM	StP	SHA	TRA	UCD
Bray Wanderers A		0–3	2–1	2–0	0–2	0–2	0–2	0–0	0–3 (Note: The match was awarded 3-0 to UCD A after Bray Wanderers Acould not field a team.)
Cobh Ramblers	2–1		1–1	2–1	0–2	0–2	1–0	5–0	0–0
F.C. Carlow	3–0 (Note: The match was awarded 3-0 to F.C. Carlow after Bray Wanderers A could not field a team.)	0–2		1–2	1–2	3–1	2–1	1–1	2–1
Galway United A	1–2	1–3	0–3 (Note: The match originally finished 2–1, but it was later awarded 3–0 to F.C. Carlow due to Galway United A having fielded an ineligible player.)		0–2	2–4	0–2	0–2	0–8
Limerick A	3–0 (Note: The match was awarded 3-0 to Limerick A after Bray Wanderers A could not field a team.)	1–3	0–1	1–1		0–1	2–1	0–2	0–4
St Patrick's Athletic A	1–3	5–0	1–1	3–0	1–1		2–1	1–0	0–2
Shamrock Rovers A	4–1	2–1	0–0	5–2	0–0	1–0		10–2	0–0
Tralee Dynamos	1–2	2–4	2–5	2–0	1–0	2–1	1–1		1–3
UCD A	2–2	1–0	4–0	6–0	4–0	5–0	3–1	1–0	

Source: loi.ie
Legend: Blue = home team win; Yellow = draw; Red = away team win.

== Play-Offs ==
=== A Championship Final ===
1 November 2010	UCD A	2 – 1	Bohemians A	UCD Bowl
19.45 GMT	Graham Rusk 1' 90+4'		Paddy Madden 70'	Referee: Rhona Daly (Roscommon)

=== Promotion/Relegation ===
The tenth placed team from the 2010 First Division, Salthill Devon, played the highest placed non-reserve team, Cobh Ramblers, from the 2010 A Championship. The winner of this play off would play in the 2011 First Division.

2 November 2010	Cobh Ramblers	0 – 1	Salthill Devon	St Colman's Park
19:45 GMT		Report	Mikey Gilmore 35'	Referee: Graham Kelly (Cork)

6 November 2010	Salthill Devon	2 – 1	Cobh Ramblers	Drom Soccer Park
19:45 GMT	Robbie Porter 8'; Ciprian Straut 90+3'	Report	Jamie Murphy 55'	Referee: John Grimes (Dublin)

Salthill Devon won 3 – 1 on aggregate and retained their place in the 2011 First Division

== See also ==
- 2010 A Championship Cup
- 2010 League of Ireland Premier Division
- 2010 League of Ireland First Division
- 2010 League of Ireland Cup
