= Andy Boyle =

Irish footballer (born 1991)

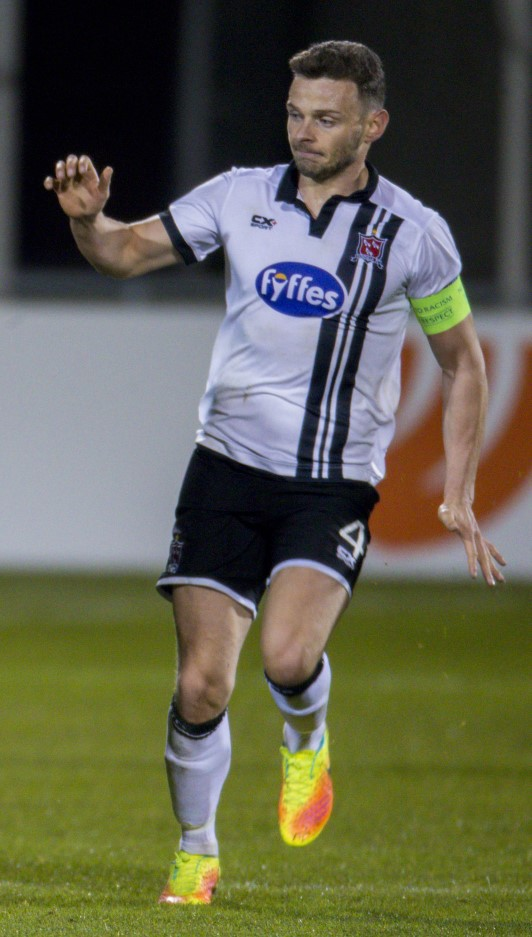
- Boyle playing against Zenit Saint Petersburg in the 2016–17 Europa League

Personal information
- Full name: Andrew Boyle
- Date of birth: 7 March 1991 (age 35)
- Place of birth: Palmerstown, Ireland
- Height: 1.85 m (6 ft 1 in)
- Position: Defender

Youth career
- Cherry Orchard
- 2006–2008: Crumlin United
- 2008: UCD

Senior career*
Years	Team	Apps	(Gls)
2009–2010	UCD	55	(1)
2011–2012	Shelbourne	52	(0)
2013–2016	Dundalk	129	(7)
2017–2019	Preston North End	10	(0)
2018	→ Doncaster Rovers (loan)	6	(1)
2018	→ Dundee (loan)	13	(1)
2019	→ Ross County (loan)	11	(1)
2019–2024	Dundalk	131	(4)
2025	Waterford	16	(0)
Total		423	(15)

International career
2006	Republic of Ireland U15	1	(0)
2009	Republic of Ireland U18	1	(0)
2009–2010	Republic of Ireland U19	4	(0)
2017	Republic of Ireland	1	(0)
- * Club domestic league appearances and goals

Andrew Boyle (born 7 March 1991) is an Irish former professional footballer who played as a centre-back. During his career he played for League of Ireland sides UCD, Shelbourne, Dundalk (over 2 spells) and Waterford, English clubs Preston North End and Doncaster Rovers and Scottish clubs Dundee and Ross County. With Dundalk, Boyle was the team's vice-captain and was part of the first Irish side to reach the play-off round of the UEFA Champions League in August 2016 and qualified for the Europa League group stages. Boyle also played regularly in 2020–21 UEFA Europa League group stage.

== Early career ==
Boyle played for Cherry Orchard at a young age, before joining Crumlin United. He was part of the Crumlin under-15 team that finished runners-up to Belvedere in the NIB SFAI Under-15 Cup. He had trials with various clubs in the United Kingdom and received offers to sign for them, but at the age of 14 he decided it would be more beneficial to stay in Ireland and get his education rather than move away in his teenage years. Boyle regularly attended League of Ireland matches around this time and developed an ambition to play in the league.

== Club career ==
=== UCD ===
Boyle joined League of Ireland First Division club UCD in 2008. He featured for the UCD under-20s in his first season and also played for the club's 'A' side in the 2008 A Championship, a second-level competition which the team won, but he didn't feature in the 2008 league campaign. Boyle made his league debut in the First Division on the opening day of the 2009 season, the day before his 18th birthday, starting in a 2–1 home win against Limerick. He went on to play in 30 of the team's 33 games as they won the First Division title, earning promotion. He also played in the 2009 FAI Cup, playing in both of UCD's games, and in the 2009 League of Ireland Cup, playing in the semi-final against Waterford United.

The following season, Boyle continued to be a key figure in the side, making 25 appearances in the Premier Division as UCD finished in 7th place. He scored his first ever goal for the side against Sporting Fingal in the league on 25 June 2010. Boyle also played in the third and fourth rounds of the 2010 FAI Cup against Drogheda United and Bray Wanderers respectively. UCD also won a second A Championship title in 2010, with Boyle playing in the final at the end of the season.

=== Shelbourne ===
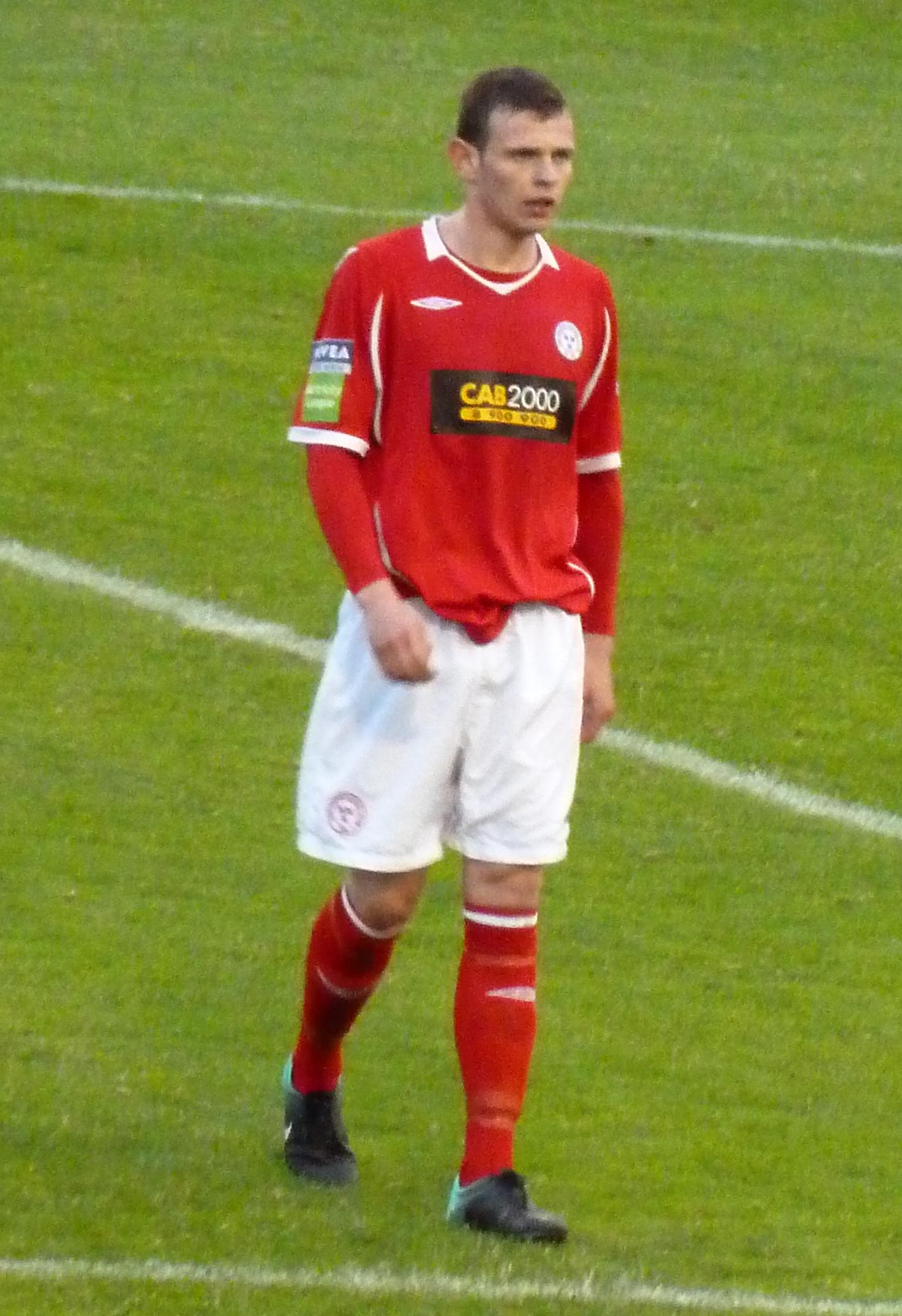
A 20 year old Boyle in action for Shelbourne in 2011.

In January 2011, Boyle moved to First Division side Shelbourne. He made 29 appearances in the league in his first season with the side. Shelbourne finished the season as runners-up, one point behind champions Cork City, and earned promotion to the Premier Division. Boyle's first season with Shelbourne also saw the team go on a run in the 2011 FAI Cup. Boyle started and scored in the team's opening game in the competition, a Third Round victory over Greystones. He then played in the Fourth Round game away to Sheriff Youth Club, which ended in a shock 3–2 defeat. However, Sheriff were discovered to have fielded an ineligible player and Shelbourne were given a 3–0 win in the tie, progressing to the quarter-finals. Boyle played in the quarter-final win against Limerick, and both the first semi-final and the replay against Dublin rivals St Patrick's Athletic. He started in the FAI final against Sligo Rovers in the Aviva Stadium which Shelbourne lost on penalties, playing the full 120 minutes. He also played in two 2011 League of Ireland Cup games, as Shelbourne were eliminated in the quarter-finals.

In Shelbourne's first season back in the Premier Division, Boyle made 22 league appearances helping the club to an 8th-place finish. He also featured in the 2012 FAI Cup, playing in all six of the team's games as they reached the semi-finals, where they were knocked out after a replay by eventual winners Derry City. Boyle played once in the 2012 League of Ireland Cup, as Shelbourne were eliminated in the Second Round.

=== Dundalk ===
Boyle left Shelbourne in December 2012 to join Premier Division side Dundalk, coached by Stephen Kenny. He arrived at the club having made over 130 senior appearances. Boyle made his competitive debut for Dundalk when playing the entire 120 minutes of the 2–0 win away to Sheriff YC in the Leinster Senior Cup on 20 February 2012. He made his league debut in the opening-day draw at home to Shamrock Rovers on 8 March. Boyle was a crucial figure in the team missing just one game in the 2013 Premier Division, as the club finished second, just three points behind champions St Patrick's Athletic. He was selected in the 2013 PFAI Premier Division Team of the Year and won the Dundalk Player's Player of the Year award.

On 16 October 2013, Boyle signed a fresh one-year deal to keep him at Oriel Park for the 2014 season. Following a long-term injury to Stephen O'Donnell, Boyle spent the majority of the 2014 season in the role of captain, and he played 32 times for the club in the league, scoring two goals, as the club claimed the league and League Cup double. After signing a two-year contract extension in October 2014, he proved to be a pivotal figure in 2015, playing every league game and scoring once as Dundalk retained the title and also won the FAI Cup in November. He also appeared in both Champions League 2nd Qualifying Round ties, as Dundalk were eliminated by BATE Borisov. Boyle was again rewarded for his performances by being named in the 2015 PFAI's Premier Division Team of the Year.

Boyle remained an integral part of Dundalk's side in 2016 as they won their third league title in-a-row and he played every minute of their European campaign as they became the first Irish side to reach the play-off round of the UEFA Champions League in August 2016, and subsequently qualified for the group stages of the Europa League. In the first leg of their Champions League play-off tie against Legia Warsaw, Boyle was punished by a contentious decision after he was deemed to have handled the ball in the penalty area and a penalty was awarded. He went on to appear in Dundalk's draw with AZ Alkmaar on 15 September as they became the first Irish side to pick up a point in the group stages of European competition, and he captained the team when they registered a victory over Maccabi Tel Aviv two weeks later. Boyle continued to captain the side against Zenit St. Petersburg in the absence of Stephen O'Donnell as Dundalk fell to a 2–1 defeat. With his contract expiring at the end of 2016, Boyle's form earned interest from several clubs in the U.K. including Barnsley and Ipswich Town, however he stated that he would wait until the Europa League group stage had concluded before deciding whether or not to sign a new contract with Dundalk.

=== Preston North End ===
It was announced on 12 December 2016 that Boyle and teammate Daryl Horgan would be joining EFL Championship club Preston North End on 1 January 2017.

==== Doncaster Rovers (loan) ====
On 30 January 2018, it was announced he had signed on loan to EFL League One side Doncaster Rovers until the end of the season.

==== Dundee (loan) ====
On 31 August 2018, Boyle joined Scottish Premiership side Dundee on loan until the end of the 2018–19 season. His loan was curtailed at the end of December 2018.

==== Ross County (loan) ====
Boyle joined Scottish Championship side Ross County on 29 January 2019 until the end of the season.

He was released by Preston at the end of the 2018–19 season.

=== Return to Dundalk ===
Boyle rejoined Irish Side Dundalk on 24 June 2019 following his release by English club Preston North End. In his first season back at the club, he helped Dundalk win the Premier Division title and the 2019 League of Ireland Cup. Boyle also played regularly in 2020–21 UEFA Europa League group stage. On 13 November it was announced that he would be departing the club following their relegation to the League of Ireland First Division.

=== Waterford ===
On 13 November 2024, it was announced that Boyle had signed for Waterford ahead of their 2025 campaign. Boyle scored 1 goal in 18 appearances in all competitions for Waterford, before announcing his retirement from professional football on 4 October 2025, a month before the end of the season, having made 525 appearances in all competitions in his senior career, scoring 19 goals.

== International career ==
Boyle has represented Ireland internationally at under-age level. On 2 June 2006, he played for the Republic of Ireland under-15 side in a Tri-Nations international game away to Northern Ireland. His next international game came at under-18 level, when he played away to Cyprus in a friendly on 7 April 2009. Boyle then played for the Republic of Ireland under-19 team, making his debut at home against Portugal on 8 September 2009 in the Clarion Hotel Four-nation Tour. He made two more appearances for Republic of Ireland U19s in the 2010 UEFA U-19 Championship Qualifying Round against Albania and Italy in November 2009, and a further one in the 2010 UEFA European Under-19 Championship Elite Round against Ukraine in May 2010.

Boyle received no further underage caps for the Republic of Ireland, but the consistency of his performances for Dundalk in the Champions League qualifying rounds and the Europa League group stage was rewarded when he was named in Martin O'Neill's provisional Republic of Ireland squad for a World Cup qualifier against Austria in November 2016, along with his Dundalk teammate Daryl Horgan.

On 28 March 2017, Boyle he made his senior international debut, coming on as a second-half substitute in a 1–0 friendly defeat against Iceland at the Aviva Stadium.

== Career statistics ==
=== Club ===
As of match played 22 August 2025

Club statistics
Club	Season	League			National Cup (Note: Includes FAI Cup, FA Cup & Scottish Cup)		League Cup (Note: Includes League of Ireland Cup & EFL Cup)		Europe		Other		Total	
Club	Season	Division	Apps	Goals	Apps	Goals	Apps	Goals	Apps	Goals	Apps	Goals	Apps	Goals
UCD	2009	LOI First Division	13	0	2	0	1	0	—		—		16	0
UCD	2010	LOI Premier Division	25	1	2	0	0	0	—		2 (Note: Appearances in Leinster Senior Cup)	0	29	1
UCD	Total		38	1	4	0	1	0	—		2	0	45	1
Shelbourne	2011	LOI First Division	29	0	6	1	2	0	—		2	0	39	1
Shelbourne	2012	LOI Premier Division	23	0	6	0	1	0	—		3	0	33	0
Shelbourne	Total		52	0	12	1	3	0	—		5	0	72	1
Dundalk	2013	LOI Premier Division	32	1	4	1	2	0	—		2	0	39	2
Dundalk	2014	LOI Premier Division	32	2	3	0	1	0	4 (Note: Appearances in UEFA Europa League)	0	5 (Note: Appearances in Setanta Sports Cup)	0	45	2
Dundalk	2015	LOI Premier Division	33	1	4	0	0	0	2 (Note: Appearances in UEFA Champions League)	0	1 (Note: Appearances in President of Ireland's Cup)	0	40	1
Dundalk	2016	LOI Premier Division	33	3	4	0	1	0	12 (Note: 6 appearances in UEFA Champions League and 6 appearances in UEFA Europa League)	0	1	0	51	3
Dundalk	Total		120	7	15	1	4	0	18	0	9	0	166	8
Preston North End	2016–17	EFL Championship	7	0	0	0	0	0	—		—		7	0
Preston North End	2017–18	EFL Championship	3	0	0	0	1	0	—		—		4	0
Preston North End	2018–19	EFL Championship	0	0	—		—		—		—		0	0
Preston North End	Total		10	0	0	0	1	0	—		—		11	0
Doncaster Rovers (loan)	2017–18	EFL League One	6	1	—		—		—		—		6	1
Dundee (loan)	2018–19	Scottish Premiership	13	1	—		—		—		—		13	1
Ross County (loan)	2018–19	Scottish Championship	11	1	2	0	—		—		2 (Note: Appearances in Scottish Challenge Cup)	0	15	1
Dundalk	2019	LOI Premier Division	8	1	0	0	1	0	6 (Note: 4 appearances in UEFA Champions League, 2 appearances in UEFA Europa League)	0	1 (Note: Appearances in Champions Cup)	0	16	1
Dundalk	2020	LOI Premier Division	12	1	4	1	—		6	0	—		22	2
Dundalk	2021	LOI Premier Division	35	1	4	0	—		6 (Note: Appearances in UEFA Europa Conference League)	0	1	0	46	1
Dundalk	2022	LOI Premier Division	32	0	3	0	—		—		—		35	0
Dundalk	2023	LOI Premier Division	18	1	1	0	—		4	0	0	0	23	1
Dundalk	2024	LOI Premier Division	26	0	0	0	—		—		1	0	27	0
Dundalk	Total		131	4	12	1	1	0	22	0	3	0	169	5
Waterford	2025	LOI Premier Division	16	0	1	0	—		—		1 (Note: Appearances in Munstsr Senior Cup)	1	18	1
Career total			397	15	46	3	10	0	40	0	22	1	525	19

=== International ===
As of match played 18 March 2017

Appearances and goals by national team and year
National team	Year	Apps	Goals
Republic of Ireland
Republic of Ireland	2017	1	0
Total		1	0

== Honours ==
=== Club ===
UCD

- League of Ireland First Division: 1
  - 2009
- A Championship: 2
  - 2008, 2010

Dundalk

- League of Ireland Premier Division: 4
  - 2014, 2015, 2016, 2019
- FAI Cup: 2
  - 2015, 2020
- League of Ireland Cup: 2
  - 2014, 2019
- President's Cup: 2
  - 2015, 2021
- Leinster Senior Cup: 1
  - 2014–15
- Champions Cup: 1
  - 2019

Ross County

- Scottish Championship: 1
  - 2018–19
- Scottish Challenge Cup: 1
  - 2018–19

=== Individual ===
- PFAI Premier Division Team of the Year: 2014, 2015, 2016
- Dundalk Players' Player of the Year: 2013
