= Evan McMillan =

Irish footballer and coach

Personal information
- Date of birth: 20 November 1986 (age 39)
- Place of birth: Dublin, Ireland
- Position: Centre back

Youth career
- Mount Merrion Youths

Senior career*
Years	Team	Apps	(Gls)
2006–2010	UCD	93	(6)
2011	St Patrick's Athletic	34	(4)
2012	Bohemians	28	(8)
2013–2014	Sligo Rovers	36	(5)
- * Club domestic league appearances and goals

Evan McMillan (born 20 November 1986) is an Irish football coach and former player. He is the older brother of fellow former footballer David McMillan.

== Career ==
=== UCD ===
McMillan was part of the Irish Colleges team that travelled to Thailand in the summer of 2007, where he finished top scorer for his country with two goals.

Later that year, McMillan captained the UCD U-21 side to their third Dr Tony O'Neill league triumph in four years, with a penalty shoot out victory over St Patrick's Athletic. He went on to make thirteen league appearances.

On 21 April 2008, UCD played against St Patrick's Athletic in the first round of the League Cup. In the 77th minute, Evan landed, in his own words, a "thundering header" to put them one goal up against their Dublin rivals. Evan celebrated in the classic style of sliding towards the corner flag on his knees. The game ended 2–0 to the Students. This goal was a special one for McMillan, as it was his first goal in professional football.

McMillan went on to make fourteen league appearances for UCD in the 2008 season and also won the inaugural 'A Championship'. UCD defeated Bohemians 2–1 in the final. McMillan scored a header in the 108th minute of the game to seal victory.

On 30 October 2009, UCD successfully completed their return to the League of Ireland Premier Division with a 5–0 victory away to Athlone Town. This win, culminated with Shelbourne losing to Longford Town on the same night, handed UCD the FAI First Division title and secured their return to the Premier Division on the first time of asking with one game remaining. McMillan played a huge role in this extraordinary season, making more appearances than any other player in the squad, while also having the best defensive record in the league, conceding only 21 goals in 33 games and keeping 16 clean sheets.

McMillan's excellent form was noted by many of his fellow players as he was subsequently named in the PFAI First Division Team of the Year for 2009 and named the UCD AFC Fans' Player of the Year for 2009.

For the 2010 season, with UCD back in the top tier of the LOI, McMillan was handed the captaincy of UCD. UCD competed well throughout the season, in which Evan played all but the opening game of the season. Evan scored two goals in the league campaign, one being the winner in a 2–1 victory away to rivals Sporting Fingal.

=== St. Patrick's Athletic ===
In the off-season, McMillan was approached by St Patricks Athletic. In mid December he made the decision to make the move to the Inchicore club and became their second signing ahead of the 2011 campaign. McMillan made a great start to the campaign, scoring against Bray and Dundalk, as well as performing well defensively. McMillan scored the winning penalty against South Dublin rivals Shamrock Rovers in the League cup on 25 April 2011. The Saints won 3–1 on penalties after McMillan's well placed penalty into the bottom left corner past Ryan Thompson. He followed up on his match-winning penalty by scoring against Galway United a week later.

McMillan played an instrumental part in St. Pats run in getting through two rounds in the Europa League qualifying rounds. He scored two goals, both at home against IBV and Karpaty Lviv.

McMillan was named fans player of the year after an excellent debut season with St Pats.

=== Bohemians ===
McMillan signed for Bohemians on 12 January 2012 and made his competitive debut in a 2–1 win over Portadown in the Setanta Sports Cup. His league debut for Bohs came against Derry City on 2 March. McMillan opened his goal account for Bohemians on 15 July in a league match vs former club UC Dublin.

=== Sligo Rovers ===
On 18 December it was reported that McMillian was close to signing for Scottish Premier League club Hibernian, but on 17 January 2013, Sligo Rovers announced the signing of McMillian. He made his debut on 4 March 2013 in the Setanta Cup quarter final 5–0 victory over Glentoran, with McMillan scoring the fifth with a fine header. He scored a total of five for the season and established himself as a first-choice centre-back beside Gavin Peers before injury kept him out of the side. He came on as a sub in the FAI Cup final to win the first major honour of this career.

=== Return to UCD ===
After a serious knee injury, McMillan returned to his former club UCD as a Player-coach.

== Honours ==
UCD

- League of Ireland First Division (1): 2009
- League of Ireland A Championship (2): 2008, 2010
- Collingwood Cup (2): 2009, 2010

St Patrick's Athletic

- Leinster Senior Cup (1): 2011

Sligo Rovers

- FAI Cup (1): 2013
- Setanta Sports Cup (1): 2014

== Career statistics ==
Club performance			League		Cup		League Cup		Cup		Continental		Total	
Season	Club	League	Apps	Goals	Apps	Goals	Apps	Goals	Apps	Goals	Apps	Goals	Apps	Goals
Republic of Ireland			League		FAI Cup		League of Ireland Cup		Setanta Cup		Europe		Total	
2006	UCD	Premier Division	0	0	0	0	0	0	0	0	0	0	0	0
2007	UCD	Premier Division	13	0	1	0	2	0	0	0	0	0	16	0
2008	UCD	Premier Division	14	0	1	0	2	2	0	0	0	0	17	2
2009	UCD	First Division	31	4	2	0	2	0	0	0	0	0	35	4
2010	UCD	Premier Division	35	2	2	0	0	0	0	0	0	0	37	2
2011	St Patrick's Athletic	Premier Division	34	4	3	1	2	0	2	0	6	2	47	7
2012	Bohemians	Premier Division	28	8	2	1	0	0	4	1	2	0	36	10
2013	Sligo Rovers	Premier Division	24	2	4	0	3	2	4	1	2	0	37	5
2014	Sligo Rovers	Premier Division	29	3	1	0	0	0	3	1	4	0	37	4
Total	Republic of Ireland		208	23	16	2	11	4	13	3	14	2	262	34
Career total			208	23	16	2	11	4	13	3	14	2	262	34
