= 2010 League of Ireland Cup =

EA Sports Cup

Tournament details
- Country: Ireland; Northern Ireland
- Teams: 29

Final positions
- Champions: Sligo Rovers
- Runners-up: Monaghan United

Tournament statistics
- Matches played: 28
- Goals scored: 83 (2.96 per match)
- Top goal scorer(s): Pádraig Amond; George O'Callaghan (5 goals)

The 2010 League of Ireland Cup, also known as the 2010 EA Sports Cup, was the 37th season of the League of Ireland knockout competition.

The competition was won by Sligo Rovers who defeated Monaghan United in the final on 25 September 2010 at the Sligo Showgrounds.

A total of 29 teams competed in the 2010 competition. The ten Premier Division, twelve First Division clubs were joined by five A Championship teams plus Letterkenny Rovers, the 2009 Ulster Senior League champions, and the Kerry District League representative side. For the Preliminary, First and second rounds of the competition, all participating clubs were split into 4 regional pools with the further rounds of the competition having an open draw. Bohemians, Shamrock Rovers, Dundalk and Sporting Fingal all received automatic byes into the second round of the competition due to each club's European football participation. The 2010 competition commenced with the preliminary round in March 2010.

== Preliminary round ==
The draw for the preliminarty round took place on 11 March 2010. Fixtures were played on 23, 29 and 30 March 2010.

=== Pool 2 ===
Tie no	Home team	Score	Away team	Report
1	Castlebar Celtic	1 - 0	Salthill Devon	

=== Pool 3 ===
Tie no	Home team	Score	Away team	Report
1	Athlone Town	1 – 0	Longford Town	Report

=== Pool 4 ===
Tie no	Home team	Score	Away team	Report
1	Monaghan United	1 – 0	Shelbourne	Report
2	Tullamore Town	2 – 2 AET	FC Carlow	
Tullamore Town won 3 – 2 on penalties

== First round ==
The draw for the first round took place on 11 March 2010. Fixtures were played on Monday 12 and Tuesday 13 April 2010.

=== Pool 1 ===
Tie no	Home team	Score	Away team	Report
1	Kerry District League	0 – 2	Waterford United	Report
2	Limerick	2 – 1	Cobh Ramblers	Report
3	Cork City F.C.	3 – 0	Wexford Youths	Report

=== Pool 2 ===
Tie no	Home team	Score	Away team	Report
1	Derry City	3 – 2	Galway United	Report
2	Castlebar Celtic	1 – 3	Finn Harps	Report
3	Mervue United	0 – 1 AET	Letterkenny Rovers	Report

=== Pool 3 ===
Tie no	Home team	Score	Away team	Report
1	UCD	1 – 0	Athlone Town	Report
2	Drogheda United	1 – 3	Bray Wanderers	Report

=== Pool 4 ===
Tie no	Home team	Score	Away team	Report
1	Monaghan United	6 – 1	Tullamore Town	Report

== Second round ==
The draw for the second round took place on 11 March 2010. Fixtures were played on Monday 10 and Tuesday 11 May 2010.

=== Pool 1 ===
Tie no	Home team	Score	Away team	Report
1	Cork City F.C.	0 – 3	Limerick	Report
2	Waterford United	9 – 0	Tralee Dynamos	Report

=== Pool 2 ===
Tie no	Home team	Score	Away team	Report
1	Sligo Rovers	6 – 0	Letterkenny Rovers	Report
2	Derry City	2 – 0	Finn Harps	Report

=== Pool 3 ===
Tie no	Home team	Score	Away team	Report
1	St. Patrick's Athletic	2 – 0	Bray Wanderers	Report
2	UCD	0 – 1	Shamrock Rovers	Report

=== Pool 4 ===
Tie no	Home team	Score	Away team	Report
1	Monaghan United	1 – 1 AET	Bohemians	Report
Monaghan United won 4 – 3 on penalties
2	Dundalk	2 – 0	Sporting Fingal	Report

== Quarter-finals ==
The draw for the quarter-finals took place on 12 May 2010. Fixtures were played on Tuesday 1 June 2010.

Tie no	Home team	Score	Away team	Report
1	Derry City	1 – 2	Shamrock Rovers	Report
2	Limerick	0 – 3	Monaghan United	Report
3	Sligo Rovers	4 – 1	St. Patrick's Athletic	Report
4	Waterford United	1 – 2	Dundalk	Report

== Semi-finals ==
The draw for the semi-finals took place on 2 June 2010. Fixtures were played on 17 August 2010.

Tie no	Home team	Score	Away team	Report
1	Sligo Rovers	2 – 1	Shamrock Rovers	Report
2	Monaghan United	1 – 0	Dundalk	Report

== Final ==
25 September 2010
17.30 IST

Sligo Rovers	1 – 0	Monaghan United
Matthew Blinkhorn 14'	Report

The Showgrounds, Sligo
Referee: Declan Hanney
