= 2009 League of Ireland Cup =

EA Sports Cup

Tournament details
- Country: Ireland; Northern Ireland
- Teams: 24

Final positions
- Champions: Bohemians
- Runners-up: Waterford United

The 2009 EA Sports Cup is the 36th staging of the League of Ireland football knockout competition.

Twenty nine clubs participated in this year's competition. The ten Premier Division, twelve First Division and the five non-reserve teams from the A Championship were joined by Kildrum Tigers, the 2008 Ulster Senior League champions, and the Kerry District League representative side. For the Preliminary, First and Second Rounds of the competition, all participating clubs were split into 4 regional pools with the further rounds of the competition having an open draw.

The 2009 EA Sports Cup kicked off on Monday, 30 March 2009 with the preliminary round. The Final was played on Saturday, 26 September 2009, and was won by Bohemians.

== Preliminary round ==
The matches were played on Monday, 30 and Tuesday, 31 March 2009.

=== Pool 2 ===
Team 1	Score	Team 2
Kildrum Tigers	1–2	Finn Harps
Salthill Devon	2–2 (aet, p. 4–3)	Mervue United

== First round ==
The matches were played on Monday, 13 and Tuesday, 14 April 2009.

=== Pool 1 ===
Team 1	Score	Team 2
Limerick	1–1 (aet, p. 3–5)	Wexford Youths
Kerry District League	1–3 (aet)	Cork City
FC Carlow	3–2	Cobh Ramblers

=== Pool 2 ===
Team 1	Score	Team 2
Galway United	2–2 (aet, p. 3–2)	Salthill Devon
Castlebar Celtic	0–4	Finn Harps

=== Pool 3 ===
Team 1	Score	Team 2
Shelbourne	3–0	Dundalk
Monaghan United	1–2	Sporting Fingal
Bray Wanderers	0–2	Drogheda United

=== Pool 4 ===
Team 1	Score	Team 2
Athlone Town	3–0	Longford Town
Shamrock Rovers	3–0	Kildare County
Tullamore Town	0–2	University College Dublin

== Second round ==
The matches were played on Monday, 4 and Tuesday, 5 May 2009.

=== Pool 1 ===
Team 1	Score	Team 2
FC Carlow	1–3 (aet)	Waterford United
Cork City	1–1 (aet, p. 4–5)	Wexford Youths

=== Pool 2 ===
Team 1	Score	Team 2
Galway United	1–0	Derry City
Sligo Rovers	4–1	Finn Harps

=== Pool 3 ===
Team 1	Score	Team 2
Drogheda United	0–2	Sporting Fingal
Bohemians	4–3 (aet)	Shelbourne

=== Pool 4 ===
Team 1	Score	Team 2
St Patrick's Athletic	0–1	Shamrock Rovers
Athlone Town	0–1	University College Dublin

== Quarter finals ==
The matches were played on Monday, 18 and Tuesday, 19 May 2009.

Team 1	Score	Team 2
Galway United	0–2	University College Dublin
Sporting Fingal	0–1	Sligo Rovers
Waterford United	2–1	Shamrock Rovers
Wexford Youths	1–2	Bohemians

== Semifinals ==
The matches were played on Monday, 3 and Tuesday, 4 August 2009.

3 August 2009
19:45 IST

Bohemians	4–2 (a.e.t.)	Sligo Rovers
Neale Fenn 56'; Paul Keegan 90'; Ken Oman 99'; Joseph Ndo 101'	Report	Matthew Blinkhorn 37'; Martin Nicolas Camano (red card) 49'; Alan Keane 61' (pen.)

Dalymount Park

4 August 2009
19:45 IST

University College Dublin	1–3	Waterford United
Chris Mulhall (red card) 87'; Ronan Finn 90' (pen.)	Report	Kenny Browne 58'; Graham Cummins 64'; Graham Cummins 86'

UCD Bowl

== Final ==
26 September 2009
17:30 IST

Waterford United	1–3	Bohemians
Kenny Browne 81'	Report	Killian Brennan 8' 30' (pen.); Neale Fenn 43'

RSC, Waterford
Attendance: c. 4,000
Referee: D. Tomney
