= Republic of Ireland football league system =

The Republic of Ireland football league system is a series of association football leagues in Ireland. Traditionally, leagues have been classified as either senior, intermediate or junior. These classifications are effectively national, provincial and county leagues respectively. However, the definition of 'junior' has expanded to include multi-county leagues (e.g. the Combined Counties Football League), regional district leagues (e.g. south Tipperary and north Dublin) and municipal district leagues (e.g. Inishowen and West Cork).

The football system currently consists of 12 levels. The two highest level divisions, the League of Ireland Premier Division and the League of Ireland First Division are both part of the only national league, the League of Ireland. As of 2025, there are only two provincial leagues operating – the Leinster Senior League and the Munster Senior League. These leagues sit below the League of Ireland in the pyramid, with their top divisions – Leinster's Senior Division and Munster's Senior Premier Division forming the pyramid's third level.

== History ==
=== Senior ===
The original national league for the island of Ireland was the Irish Football League. Founded in 1890, this league later became the Northern Ireland Football League. Three Dublin clubs – Bohemians, Shelbourne and Tritonville – played in the Irish Football League before the partition of Ireland. In June 1921, less than a month after partition, the League of Ireland was founded as the highest level of league competition in the Republic of Ireland. The inaugural season of the new national league was held in 1921–22 with St James’ Gate winning the first-ever League of Ireland title.

In 1985, six clubs were elected to the league to bring the total to 22 teams. Following a reorganisation, the League of Ireland was then split into two divisions with the creation of a Premier Division and a First Division. This also introduced promotion and relegation to senior football in Ireland for the first time. The league's Premier Division is the top division.

The 2003 season would see the League of Ireland change from a winter league to a summer league. Each team played four rounds of games, totalling 36 games each.

=== Intermediate ===
The two oldest association football leagues in the Republic of Ireland are the Leinster Senior League and the Munster Senior League. Both leagues are classed as intermediate. The former was founded in 1896 while the latter first appeared in the early 1900s. The Leinster Senior League's jurisdiction included the Greater Dublin Area, the most populated region in the country, and as a result it was effectively a de facto second-level league between 1896–97 and 1964–65.

In 1964 the League of Ireland initiated the first formal attempt at a national second level division, the League of Ireland B Division. As a national league, the B Division acted as the de facto second tier between 1964–65 and 1984–85. Although the league was national, the participants weren't classed as senior teams. Instead, they retained their intermediate status and were allowed to continue competing in the FAI Intermediate Cup. There was also no promotion between the B Division and the League of Ireland, although there are examples of B teams being elected to the top division – such as UCD in 1979.

From 1964–65 until 1985 the Leinster Senior League and the Munster Senior League formed the third level of the pyramid. They were subsequently joined by the Connacht Senior League in 1981 with the Ulster Senior League forming in 1986.

In 1985, following a reorganisation, the B Division was replaced as the second tier by the League of Ireland First Division. As part of this reorganisation, a promotion and relegation system involving the top two national divisions was introduced for the first time.

Between 2008 and 2011, the provincial leagues were briefly replaced as the third level by a short lived national third-level league known as the A Championship. Following the demise of the A Championship, the provincial leagues regained their third level status. Both the Connacht and Ulster leagues were subsequently wound up.

=== Junior ===
Association football at a junior level was also becoming organised with the establishment of a Tipperary League and a Sligo League in the 1920s. In 1923, the first national cup competition for junior clubs was set up. Called the FAI Junior Cup, the competition's first winners were Brideville who beat Cobh Ramblers in the inaugural 1923–24 final. In 1924, the Waterford and District Football League was formed.

The Cork Business League was founded in 1952 and was granted junior status for the 1952–53 season. In Donegal, the first association football league in the county — the North-West Donegal League — was founded the same year and formally affiliated to the FAI. In 1954 Westport Town, Barcastle, Quay Hearts and Castlebar Celtic became the founder members of the Mayo Association Football League. In 1977, the junior league in Tipperary, which had initially covered the entire county, split into separate north and south competitions. After failing to gain entry to the Louth & District League and the Leinster Junior League in September 1980, Kilmessan A.F.C. instigated the founding of the Mid Meath League which was renamed the Meath & District League for the 1983–84 season.

In 2014, the Meath & District League was renamed to the North East Football League to reflect the addition of teams from Louth, Cavan and Monaghan.

== Cup eligibility ==
Being members of a league at a particular level also affects eligibility for Cup, or single-elimination, competitions.

- FAI Cup: Levels 1–3
- League of Ireland Cup: Levels 1–2
- FAI Intermediate Cup: Levels 3–7
- FAI Junior Cup: Levels 7–12

Below level 7 the pyramid becomes regional and the cups become accordingly regional. Further down the pyramid is split on a county basis, counties having their own cups accordingly. This excludes some tournaments marked "Senior Cups", which often are competitions between teams representing top professional clubs in a given district, such as the Munster Senior Cup.

== Promotion and relegation ==
A promotion and relegation system has existed between the League of Ireland Premier Division and the League of Ireland First Division since 1985–86. Between 2008 and 2011, A Championship teams were also eligible for promotion to the First Division. Promotion and relegation systems also operate within the separate provincial league systems. There is no formal promotion and relegation relationship between the provincial leagues and the League of Ireland. Teams have been invited to join the League of Ireland however. In 2015, Cabinteely of the Leinster Senior League became the most recent team to accept an invite. In 2024, it was announced by the FAI that a 3rd tier will be launched in 2026. The new league is expected to eventually contain 20 clubs in total, split into North and South divisions. The teams will play against other teams in their respective divisions first to qualify for playoffs, where top teams from North and South will compete for a chance to be promoted to the LOI Men's First Division. The inaugural season was announced by the FAI in 2025, beginning in August 2026 for a truncated competition running to November. The league format for this season consists of 15 teams split into 3 groups of 5, with group winners and the best runner-up entering into semi-finals, with the eventual final winner being crowned FAI National League champions. This is expected to be followed by a full 2027 season, which will include the opportunity to be promoted to the League of Ireland First Division (Level 2).

== The system ==
Level one in the pyramid, and the top league division, is the League of Ireland Premier Division. Run by the League of Ireland clubs alongside the Football Association of Ireland (FAI), the winners of this division are regarded as the champions of the Republic of Ireland. Level two is known as the League of Ireland First Division. Together, these two divisions make up what is known as "league football". Both leagues operate across a calendar season, also known as summer football.

The leagues below level two are classed as "non-League football", meaning they are outside the League of Ireland. Prior to the introduction of the FAI National League, effectively a new third tier for Irish football, for a truncated, shortened 2026 season, the leagues at levels three to six comprised the Provincial League System, and are run by the Provinces. The top level of the Provincial leagues is known as the Senior Leagues and the winners of which are regarded as the champions of their respective Province. As of 2024, only Munster and Leinster have leagues at this level. Levels seven to twelve are designed as "Regional Feeder Leagues" or District Leagues. The leagues from levels three and below operate across calendar years, also known as a winter season, with a few exceptions. In December 2024, the FAI voted to align all leagues to one football calendar, with summer seasons chosen over winter seasons. As of 2026, the only lower levels that operate on a summer season format in the men's game are the Mayo, Kildare, Waterford, Dundalk, North East and Cork Business leagues.

There is currently no promotion or relegation system between the League of Ireland First Division (Level 2) and the provincial leagues in place. However, there is plans to introduce promotion from the newly formed FAI National League to the League of Ireland from the 2027 season. There is no movement between the football league and non-league provincial football and the only way non-league club can enter the football league is if they are elected.

=== Current Structure ===
Level	Total clubs	League(s) / division(s)			
1	10	League of Ireland; Premier Division; 10 clubs – 1 or 2 relegations			
2	10	League of Ireland; First Division; 10 clubs – 1 or 2 promotions			
	20	No Promotion/Relegation			
3	15	FAI National League; 15 clubs – 0 promotions, 0 relegations			
4	24	Connacht Senior League; Premiership 0 clubs – Defunct	Munster Senior League; Senior Premier Division 10 clubs – 2 or 3 relegations	Leinster Senior League; Senior Division 14 clubs – 3 relegations	Ulster Senior League; Senior Division 0 clubs – Defunct
5	24	Connacht Senior League; First Division 0 clubs – Defunct	Munster Senior League; Senior First Division 10 clubs – 2 or 3 promotions, 2 or 3 relegations	Leinster Senior League; Senior 1 14 clubs – 3 promotions, 3 relegations	Ulster Senior League; First Division 0 clubs – Defunct
6	26		Munster Senior League; Senior Second Division 12 clubs – 2 or 3 promotions	Leinster Senior League; 1A 14 clubs – 3 promotions, 3 relegations	
7	14			Leinster Senior League; 1B 14 clubs – 3 promotions, 3 relegations	
8	TBD (~147)	Galway & District League; Premier Division; 10 clubs – 2 relegations Mayo Association Football League; Super League; 10 clubs – 2 relegations Roscommon & District Football League; Premier Division; 8 clubs – 1 or 2 relegations Sligo Leitrim & District Soccer League; Super League; 12 clubs – 4 relegations	Clare District Soccer League; Premier Division; 10 clubs – 1 or 2 relegations Cork Athletic Union League; Premier League; 8 clubs – 2 or 3 relegations Cork Business League; Premier Division; 8 clubs – 2 relegations West Cork League; Premier Division; 8 clubs – 1 or 2 relegations Kerry District League; Premier; 10 clubs – 2 relegations Limerick Desmond League; Premier Division; 8 clubs – 2 relegations Limerick & District League; Premier League; 12 clubs – 2 relegations North Tipperary & District League; Premier Division; 9 clubs – 1 relegation Tipperary Southern & District League; Premier Division; 8 clubs – 1 relegation Waterford & District Junior League; Premier League; 10 clubs – 1 relegation West Waterford East Cork Junior League; 0 clubs – Defunct	Leinster Senior League; Major Sunday; 12 clubs – 3 promotions, 3 relegations Carlow & District Football League; Premier Division; 9 clubs – 1 relegation Kilkenny & District Soccer League; Premier Division; 10 clubs – 2 relegations North East Football League (Note: Formerly known as the Meath & District League. Features teams from Meath, Louth, Cavan & Monaghan.); Premier Division; 10 clubs – 2 relegations Wexford Football League; Premier Division; 11 clubs – 2 or 3 relegations Wicklow & District Football League; Premier Division; 10 clubs – 2 relegations Amateur Football League (Note: Over 35s League that features teams from Dublin, Kildare, Meath & Louth) Premier Division – 10 clubs Leinster Football League Premier Division United Churches Football League / Athletic Union League (Dublin) (Note: AUL and UCFL partnered for a joined Premier Division in 2024 that features 6 clubs from each league system.); Premier Division; 12 clubs – Combined Counties Football League (Note: The Midlands League that features teams from Laois, Longford, Offaly and Westmeath with additional teams from South Roscommon.) Senior Division – 9 clubs Dundalk & District League Premier Division – 6 clubs Kildare & District Football League (Note: Kildare League that features teams from Kildare & Laois) Senior Division – 9 clubs Sources:	Donegal Junior League; Premier Division; 9 clubs – 1 or 2 relegations Inishowen Football League; Premier Division; 9 clubs – 0 or 1 relegation Monaghan Cavan League; Premier Division 6 clubs – 0 relegations
9	TBD (~39)	Galway & District League; Championship; 12 clubs – 2 promotions, 4 relegations Mayo Association Football League; Premier League; 10 clubs – 2 promotions, 2 relegations Roscommon & District Football League; Division One; 7 clubs – 1 or 2 promotions, 1 or 2 relegations Sligo Leitrim & District Soccer League; Premier League; 10 clubs – 4 relegations	Clare District Soccer League; First Division; 10 clubs – 1 or 2 promotions, 3 relegations Cork Athletic Union League; Premier A League; 7 clubs – 2 or 3 promotions, 2 relegations Cork Business League; First Division; 8 clubs – 3 promotions, 2 relegations Kerry District League Premier B – 8 clubs Limerick Desmond League Division One – 8 clubs Limerick & District League Premier A League – 12 clubs Munster Senior League Junior First Division – 10 clubs	Leinster Senior League Saturday Major 1 Leinster Senior League Sunday Major 1 United Churches Football League Division One - 10 clubs North Tipperary & District Soccer League First Division – 8 clubs Tipperary Southern & District Division One – 7 clubs	Monaghan Cavan League; First Division; 0 clubs – Defunct
10	TBD (˜36)	Galway & District League; Division One; 9 clubs – 2p,3r Mayo Association Football League; League One; 10 clubs – 2p,2r Roscommon & District Football League; Division Two; 7 clubs – 1 or 2 promotions Sligo Leitrim & District Soccer League; First Division; 10 clubs – 4 promotions	Clare District Soccer League; Second Division; 9 clubs – 3p,3r Cork Athletic Union League League 1; 8 clubs – 2p,2r Munster Senior League Junior Second Division – 10 clubs Cork Business League Second Division – 11 clubs West Cork League Division Two Kerry District League Division 1A – 8 clubs, 2p, 2r Limerick Desmond League Division Two – 6 clubs Limerick & District League Division 1A – 11 clubs North Tipperary & District Soccer League Second Division – 9 clubs Tipperary Southern & District Division Two – 8 clubs	Leinster Senior League Saturday Major 1A Leinster Senior League Premier Sunday United Churches Football League Division Two - 12 clubs	
11	TBD (~21)	Galway & District League; Division 2; 12 clubs – 2p Mayo Association Football League; League Two; 9 clubs – 2p	Clare District Soccer League; Third Division; 8 clubs – 3p Munster Senior League Junior Third Division – 10 clubs Cork Athletic Union League Division 2 – 9 clubs Kerry District League Division 1B – 8 clubs, 2p, 2r Limerick Desmond League Division Three – 7 clubs Limerick & District League Division 1B – 10 clubs Tipperary Southern & District Division Three – 10 clubs	Leinster Senior League Saturday Major 1B; Leinster Senior League Premier 1 Sunday; United Churches Football League Division Three - 11 clubs	
12	TBD		Munster Senior League Junior Fourth Division – 10 clubs Cork Athletic Union League Division 3 – 11 clubs Kerry District League Division 2A – 7 clubs, 2p, 2r Limerick & District League Division 2A – 10 clubs	Leinster Senior League Saturday Major 1C Leinster Senior League Sunday Division 3 United Churches Football League Division 3A - 12 clubs	
13	TBD		Kerry District League Division 2B – 8 clubs, 2p, 2r Limerick & District League Division 2B – 9 clubs West Cork League; Premier Division; 8 clubs – 1 or 2r	Leinster Senior League Saturday Major 1D Leinster Senior League Sunday Division 3A United Churches Football League Division 3B - 11 clubs	
14	TBD		Leinster Senior League (association football) Premier Saturday – 9 clubs, 2p, 2r Kerry District League Division 3A – 9 clubs, 2p, 2r Limerick & District League Division 3A – 8 clubs West Cork League; Championship Division; 11 clubs – 1 or 2p		
15	TBD		Limerick & District League Division 3B – 12 clubs		

=== 2026 Pyramid ===
Level	Total clubs	League(s) / division(s)														
1	10	League of Ireland Premier Division; 10 clubs – 1 or 2 relegations														
2	10	League of Ireland First Division; 10 clubs – 1 or 2 promotions, 0 relegations														
3	15	FAI National League; 15 clubs – 0 promotions, 0 relegations														
4	20	League of Ireland Second Division North; 10 clubs – 0 or 1 promotions								League of Ireland Second Division South; 10 clubs – 0 or 1 promotions						
Provincial level		Ulster			Leinster					Connacht				Munster		
4–	?	Ulster Senior League			Leinster Senior League 10 clubs					Connacht Senior League				Munster Senior League Senior Premier Division 10 clubs		
5														Munster Senior League Senior First Division 10 clubs		
6														Munster Senior League Senior Second Division 10 clubs		
District level		Donegal	Cavan	Monaghan	Dublin	Carlow / Kilkenny / Wexford	Kildare / Laois / Offaly / Wicklow	Longford / Westmeath	Louth / Meath	Galway	Mayo	Roscommon	Sligo / Leitrim	Cork	Tipperary / Waterford	Kerry / Clare / Limerick
7	?													Cork Athletic Union League Premier Division – 8 clubs Cork Business League Premier Division – 11 clubs West Cork League Premier Division – 9 clubs Munster Senior League Junior Premier Division – 10 clubs	North Tipperary & District Soccer League Premier Division – 8 clubs Tipperary Southern & District Premier League – 9 clubs Waterford & District Junior Premier League – 10 clubs	Clare District Soccer League Premier Division – 9 clubs Kerry District League Premier A – 8 clubs Limerick Desmond League Premier Division – 10 clubs Limerick & District League Premier League – 8 clubs

== See also ==
- Northern Irish football league system
