= Ray Keogh =

Irish footballer (died 2019)

Personal information
- Full name: Raphael Keogh
- Place of birth: Dublin, Ireland
- Date of death: 26 August 2019
- Position: Outside right

Youth career
- –: Home Farm

Senior career*
Years	Team	Apps	(Gls)
1959	Shamrock Rovers		
1959–60	Longford Town		
1960–1964	Drumcondra		
1964–1966	Ards		
1966	Portadown		
1966	Cork Hibernians		
1966–1970	Drogheda		
1970–?	Tullamore Town		
- Parkvilla

International career
1961	League of Ireland XI		
- * Club domestic league appearances and goals

Raphael Keogh was an Irish footballer, widely regarded as being the first black player in the League of Ireland. Raised in the south Dublin suburb of Milltown, Keogh initially played schoolboy football with Castleville and Home Farm before joining local League of Ireland side Shamrock Rovers. Making his senior football debut in 1959, Keogh would go on to play for, among others, Drumcondra, Ards, Drogheda and Cork Hibernians.

Keogh was part of the Drumcondra side that played a number of matches in European competition in the early 60s, including a 1–0 home win over Bayern Munich in the 1962–63 Inter-Cities Fairs Cup. He was a League of Ireland XI international footballer and played professionally on both sides of the Irish border.

== Early years ==
Keogh played schoolboy football with Castleville and Home Farm. He made appearances for the Shamrock Rovers reserve side in 1958 before making his first team debut a year later. It has mistakenly been stated that Ray was part of the Rovers side that faced Manchester United in a European Cup tie in 1957, it was however, the similarly named Shay Keogh who featured in this match. With opportunities hard to come by in a talented and successful Rovers side; Keogh would sign for Longford Town in the 59–60 season. His stay with the B Division side was short before moving back to the top flight of Irish football with north Dublin's Drumcondra.

== Drumcondra ==
With Drums Keogh would feature in the 1961 FAI Cup Final, losing to St. Patrick's Athletic. He would, however, claim his first league title that year, with Drumcondra finishing a solitary point ahead of St. Pats, and Keogh's teammate Dan McCaffrey top-scorer with 29 goals. The league win meant that Drumcondra qualified for the European Cup as League Champions for the 1961-62 European Cup, which was Keogh's first full season with the side. He featured in the First Round aggregate defeat at the hands of German champions FC Nürnberg, playing in a 5–0 loss away at Städtisches Stadion in front of over 30,000 spectators, but didn't play in the 4–1 home loss at Tolka Park. Drumcondra would finish 7th in the League that season, but qualified for the 1962–63 Inter-Cities Fairs Cup, a predecessor to the Europa League.

The first round of the Fairs Cup saw Drums drawn against an Odense XI from Denmark. The first-leg saw Drumcondra triumph 4–1, with Keogh playing in front of the 12,000 spectators at Tolka Park. He was also part of the team that lost 4–2 away in Denmark, but Drumcondra had done enough to go through 6–5 on aggregate. In the Second Round, they were drawn against German club Bayern Munich. While Keogh didn't feature in the 0-6 first leg loss at Grünwalder Stadion, he returned to the starting line-up for the home leg at Tolka Park as Drums recorded one of the most famous wins by a League of Ireland side in Europe, winning 1–0. Drumcondra would finish 3rd in the League that year.

== Later years ==
Keogh moved North in 1964, playing for Ards and briefly with Portadown. In 1966 he joined Cork Hibernians and also spent time with Drogheda FC. During his time with Drogheda, Keogh would play under Arthur Fitzsimons and later Mick Meagan.

After retiring from senior football, Keogh moved into coaching with Tullamore Town where, as player-manager, he would win the 1970-71 Intermediate Cup and the League of Ireland B Division. He also later coached at Parkvilla F.C. based Navan, County Meath and Bluebell United F.C. in Dublin.

== League of Ireland XI ==
Keogh won representative honours representing the League of Ireland selection on a number of occasions, making his debut in a September 1961 1–1 draw against a Scottish League XI in front of 6,000 people at Dalymount Park. Keogh would go to make several appearances for the league throughout his career.

== Honours ==
Drumcondra

- League of Ireland: 1
  - 1960–61
- League of Ireland Shield: 1
  - 1961–62
- LFA President's Cup: 1
  - 1961–62
- Dublin City Cup: 1
  - 1960–61
- Leinster Senior Cup: 1
  - 1962–62
