= League of Ireland B Division =

- Founded: 1964
- Folded: 2000
- Replaced by: League of Ireland U21 Division; The A Championship
- Country: (Republic of Ireland) Ireland
- Level on pyramid: 2 (1964–1985); 3 (1985–2000)
- Domestic cup(s): FAI Cup; FAI Intermediate Cup
- League cup(s): Blackthorn Trophy^{See; Note 1} Castrol Trophy; Egan C&C Trophy

The League of Ireland B Division is a former association football division within the League of Ireland, that was a nationwide league and part of the wider Republic of Ireland football league system. Originally positioned as the second level of the league, following the emergence of the League of Ireland First Division in 1985–86 the B Division became the third tier. Like the later A Championship, the League of Ireland B Division included a mixture of League of Ireland reserve teams and the first teams of emerging clubs.

The division was introduced for the 1964–65 season and was originally the second tier of the national league, although there was no relegation and promotion to and from the top division in the League of Ireland. Nevertheless, a number of B Division teams — including Home Farm, Athlone Town, UCD, Longford Town and Monaghan United — were subsequently elected to the senior division. In later seasons the league was usually referred to as the Combination League or the Reserve Division. It was replaced by the League of Ireland U21 Division in 2005.

== History ==
=== Early seasons ===
The League of Ireland B Division started life in 1964. The first season was 1964–65 and ten teams competed for the league title. The ten founding members were Home Farm, Bray Wanderers, Athlone Town and Shamrock Rovers B as well as the reserve teams of Shelbourne, Bohemians, St Patrick's Athletic, Dundalk, Drumcondra and Drogheda. The 1965–66 season saw the league expanded to include twelve teams. Bray Wanderers dropped out, while Dalkey United, Ormeau and Tullamore Town all joined. Early sponsors of the league included Blackthorn Cider and Castrol.

During the early seasons teams competed for two trophies. The Blackthorn Trophy was initially awarded to the overall winners of the league. The Castrol Trophy was awarded to the winners of a single round league. The 1967–68 season saw Belgrove replace Ormeau, Athlone Town win the Castrol Trophy and Shamrock Rovers B win the Blackthorn Trophy. In 1968–69 Athlone Town won both the Castrol Trophy and Blackthorn Trophy, finishing six points clear of St Patrick's Athletic. The holders left the following season, with Athlone Town deciding to take up a place in the 1969–70 League of Ireland senior division.

In 1970 UCD were elected to the League of Ireland B Division. Their senior team would continue to play in the B Division until 1979–80 when they were elected to join the Senior Division. Among the players who played for UCD during this time were Kevin Moran and Hugo MacNeill, with the latter scoring 46 goals in the 1978–79 season. A myth emerged that alleged the Brazilian international Sócrates had played for UCD during this time, but was later debunked by the player himself. This period also saw players such as Harry McCue gain minutes in the B division, who regarded the competition as crucial to his development.

In 1975, Dublin University A.F.C., the oldest club in the Republic of Ireland and based in Trinity College, was elected to the B Division with a team coached by Liam Tuohy. Hugo MacNeill would also play for Dublin University.

=== Dalkey United controversy ===
During the mid-1970s Dalkey United enjoyed moderate success while playing in the B Division. In 1973–74 they won the FAI Intermediate Cup and between 1975 and 1976 and 1977–78 they won the Blackthorn Trophy three times in a row. However their time in the league would end in controversial circumstances. Frank Mullen described the B Division as the "most incompetent" league Dalkey United had ever been involved with. Clubs without a senior team in the League of Ireland "were treated very unfairly". It was not uncommon for Dalkey United to travel to away games against Waterford United or Dundalk only to find the game postponed. No compensation for travel expenses would be offered either. In the 1977–78 season Dalkey United were due to travel to Dundalk to play in the quarter-final of the Blackthorn Trophy. However a few days before the game was due to be played the Dundalk manager, Jim McLaughlin, phoned the Dalkey United chairman to request the game be postponed due to heavy snow. Dalkey United agreed and Dundalk subsequently informed the league the match was cancelled. However a few weeks later the semi-final draw was made and Dalkey United found themselves excluded. The club informed the league that the quarter-final against Dundalk had not been played, only to be told that the semi-finals were going ahead regardless. Dundalk were ordered to play the semi-final or face expulsion from the competition. Dalkey United opted to take legal action and the case was heading for the High Court when the league decided to declare semi-final results null and void. After winning the rescheduled quarter-final against Dundalk, Dalkey United then won the semi-final and went on to defeat Bohemians in the final at Dalymount Park. Having won the Blackthorn Trophy for a third time in a row, Dalkey United resigned from the league immediately afterwards and never applied to rejoin. They subsequently joined the Leinster Senior League.

=== Athlone and Rovers titles ===
In 1983–84, Monaghan United joined the league and Athlone Town Reserves won the B Division title, by now known as the Egan C&C Trophy. Other teams in the B Division this season included Dublin University, Longford Town, St Brendan's, Belgrove, Shamrock Rovers B and the reserve teams of Waterford United, Dundalk, Shelbourne, Drogheda, St Patrick's Athletic, Bohemians and UCD. The Athlone Town team included Fran Hitchcock, John Caulfield and Turlough O'Connor, who was their highest goalscorer. O'Connor had earlier played for Town in the same division back in its debut season of 1964–65.

Shamrock Rovers B added to their 1967–68 trophy with two more league titles in 1984–85 and 1986–87.

=== 1990s and dissolution ===
Shamrock Rovers added to their trophy haul with another league title in the 1995–96 season. In 1997–98, after 28 years of membership, UCD won its first ever B Division title. Their B team finished their 24-match campaign unbeaten. In 2005, the national League of Ireland 'B' Division became the League of Ireland U21 Division and the League moved to a summer season.

== Champions ==
By season

| Season | Champions | Runners-up | Third place |
|---|---|---|---|
| 1967–68 | Shamrock Rovers B | | |
| 1968–69 | Athlone Town | St. Patrick's Athletic B | Home Farm |
| 1980–81 | Dundalk B | CYM | Belgrove |
| 1981–82 | Bohemians B | Dundalk B | Athlone Town B |
| 1982–83 | Dundalk B | Belgrove | Longford Town |
| 1983–84 | Athlone Town B | Shelbourne B | Tullamore Town |
| 1984–85 | Shamrock Rovers B | Belgrove | St. Patrick’s Athletic B |
| 1985–86 | Dundalk B | Drogheda United B | Bohemians B |
| 1986–87 | Shamrock Rovers B | Bray Wanderers B | UCD B |
| 1987–88 | St. Patrick's Athletic B | Shamrock Rovers B | Bohemians B |
| 1988–89 | Bohemians B | St. Patrick's Athletic B | UCD B |
| 1989–90 | St. Patrick's Athletic B | Bohemians B | Shelbourne B |

== Notes ==
- ^1 The Irish Trophy seems to have changed formats. According to Frank McCann, it was initially awarded to the overall winners of the league and it used the traditional league format of two rounds of games played home and away. However Frank Mullen describes it as a knockout competition or league cup of the B Division. During the 1980s, according to Lynch, winners of the league were awarded the Egan C&C Trophy
