= A-League (disambiguation) =

The A-League is a men's professional soccer league in Australia and New Zealand.

A-League may also refer to:

- A-League Women, the Australian women's professional association football league
- A-League Youth, a defunct Australian youth association football league, run from 2008 to 2020
- American Professional Soccer League, a defunct American soccer league known as A-League from 1995 to 1996
- USL First Division, a defunct American soccer league known as A-League from 1997 to 2004

== See also ==
- A-Leagues, the governing body for professional soccer leagues in Australia
- A Championship, the third-tier men's association football league in the Republic of Ireland
