= 2011 A Championship =

Newstalk A Championship
- Season: 2011
- Champions: Derry City A
- Top goalscorer: Stephen McCarthy (12)
- Biggest home win: St Patrick's Athletic A 12-0 Galway United A
- Biggest away win: Galway United A 1-6 Tralee Dynamos
- Highest scoring: St Patrick's Athletic A 12-0 Galway United A
- Longest winning run: Shamrock Rovers A (8)
- Longest unbeaten run: Bray Wanderers A(12)
- Longest losing run: Dundalk A & Galway United A (6)

The 2011 A Championship was the fourth and final season of the A Championship in Ireland. The season was sponsored by Newstalk. The league featured 16 teams. Derry City A were the champions, while UCD A finished as runners up.

Location of teams in 2011 A Championship

== Pool 1 ==
=== Teams ===
Team	Base	Stadium
Bohemians A	Phibsborough	Dalymount Park
Derry City A	Derry	Brandywell Stadium
Drogheda United A	Drogheda	United Park
Dundalk A	Dundalk	Oriel Park
Finn Harps A	Ballybofey	Finn Park
Fanad United	Fanad	Tragh-a-Lough
Sligo Rovers A	Sligo	Showgrounds
UCD A	Belfield	UCD Bowl

=== Final table ===
Pos	Team	Pld	W	D	L	GF	GA	GD	Pts	Qualification
1	Derry City A (A)	14	10	3	1	35	10	+25	33	Qualification for A Championship play-off
2	UCD A (A)	14	8	2	4	31	22	+9	26	Qualification for A Championship play-off
3	Sligo Rovers A	14	6	3	5	21	25	−4	21	
4	Fanad United	14	5	3	6	23	21	+2	18	
5	Bohemians A	14	5	3	6	16	18	−2	18	
6	Drogheda United A	14	5	1	8	23	28	−5	16	
7	Finn Harps A	14	3	4	7	15	23	−8	13	
8	Dundalk A	14	3	3	8	11	28	−17	12	

Source: loi.ie
Rules for classification: 1) points; 2) goal difference; 3) number of goals scored. Note: Reserve teams are ineligible for promotion.
(A) Advance to a further round

=== Results ===
Home \ Away	BOH	DER	DRO	DUN	FAN	FHA	SLI	UCD
Bohemians A		0–0	2–1	0–1	3–0	2–2	1–0	2–3
Derry City A	2–0		1–0	8–0	3–1	3–1	5–0	2–2
Drogheda United A	0–3	2–3		5–2	4–3	3–0 (Note: The match was awarded 3-0 to Drogheda United A after Finn Harps A could not field a team.)	2–3	2–1
Dundalk A	0–1	1–0	1–1		1–1	2–1	0–1	2–3
Fanad United	2–0	1–2	3–0	2–0		3–0	2–2	0–3
Finn Harps A	1–1	0–3	4–1	0–0	1–0		4–1	0–1
Sligo Rovers A	3–0 (Note: The match was awarded 3-0 to Sligo Rovers A after Bohemians A forfeited the game.)	0–0	2–1	3–0	0–3	1–1		1–3
UCD A	3–1	2–3	0–1	3–1	2–2	2–1	3–4	

Source: loi.ie
Legend: Blue = home team win; Yellow = draw; Red = away team win.

== Pool 2 ==
=== Teams ===
Team	Base	Stadium
Bray Wanderers A	Bray	Carlisle Grounds
F.C. Carlow	Carlow	The Meadows, Graiguecullen
Cobh Ramblers	Cobh	St Colman's Park
Galway United A	Galway	Castle Park, Ballybane
Limerick A	Limerick	Aisling-Annacotty Grounds
St Patrick's Athletic A	Inchicore	Richmond Park
Shamrock Rovers A	Tallaght	Tallaght Stadium
Tralee Dynamos	Tralee	Cahermoneen

=== Final table ===
Pos	Team	Pld	W	D	L	GF	GA	GD	Pts	Qualification
1	Bray Wanderers A (A)	14	11	1	2	45	12	+33	34	Qualification for A Championship play-off
2	Shamrock Rovers A (A)	14	11	0	3	33	14	+19	33	Qualification for A Championship play-off
3	St Patrick's Athletic A	14	6	1	7	31	26	+5	19	
4	F.C. Carlow	14	6	1	7	27	27	0	19	
5	Tralee Dynamos	14	5	4	5	27	28	−1	19	
6	Cobh Ramblers	14	5	3	6	23	21	+2	18	
7	Limerick A	14	2	4	8	21	39	−18	10	
8	Galway United A	14	3	0	11	10	50	−40	9	

Source: loi.ie
Rules for classification: 1) points; 2) goal difference; 3) number of goals scored. Note: Reserve teams are ineligible for promotion.
(A) Advance to a further round

=== Results ===
Home \ Away	BRW	COB	CAR	GAL	LIM	StP	SHA	TRA
Bray Wanderers A		3–1	4–0	8–0	3–1	5–1	1–0	1–2
Cobh Ramblers	1–2		2–2	3–0	3–1	2–4	0–1	3–3
F.C. Carlow	0–3	0–2		4–0	2–1	0–1	3–5	6–1
Galway United A	0–4	0–2	2–1		2–3	2–1	0–3	1–6
Limerick A	2–6	0–0	1–2	0–2		0–0	1–3	2–2
St Patrick's Athletic A	2–4	0–1	2–1	12–0	3–6		3–1	2–1
Shamrock Rovers A	1–0	2–1	1–3	2–1	8–0	2–0		1–0
Tralee Dynamos	1–1	3–2	2–3	1–0	3–3	1–0	1–3	

Source: loi.ie
Legend: Blue = home team win; Yellow = draw; Red = away team win.

== A Championship play-offs ==
The 2011 season saw the two pool winners plus the two pool runners-up qualify for the title play-off.

Semi-finals

20 August 2011	Derry City A	2–0	Shamrock Rovers A	Brandywell Stadium
14.00	McCrudden 38'; Matthew Harkin 77' (pen.)			Attendance: 75; Referee: Terence Moyne (Donegal)

21 August 2011	Bray Wanderers A	1–3	UCD A	Carlisle Grounds
13:00	Shane O'Neill 23'		Samir Belhout 26' (pen.), 71' (pen.); Chris Lyons 90+3'	Referee: Rhona Daly (Roscommon)

Final

16 September 2011	Derry City A	3–2	UCD A	Brandywell Stadium
19:45	Harkin 14'; Farren 55'; McDaid 75'		Craig Mooney 84'; Darren Meenan 90'

== Top goalscorers ==
Rank	Scorer	Team	Goals
1	Stephen McCarthy	Tralee Dynamos	12
2	Conor Meade	Cobh Ramblers	10
	David McDaid	Derry City A	10
	Darragh Healy	Sligo Rovers A	10
4	Kieran Waters	Bray Wanderers A	9
5	Stephen Doyle	UCD A	8

== See also ==
- 2011 League of Ireland Premier Division
- 2011 League of Ireland First Division
- 2011 League of Ireland Cup
