= Castleisland A.F.C. =

Football club in County Kerry, Ireland

- Full name: Castleisland Football Club
- Founded: 1973
- Ground: George O'Callaghan Park, Castleisland
- League: Kerry District League
Home colours

Castleisland A.F.C. is an Irish football club located in Castleisland, County Kerry. As of 2014, the club fielded teams in the Premier A division of the Kerry District League.
