= 2008 A Championship =

A Championship
- Season: 2008
- Champions: UCD A
- Promoted: Mervue United

The 2008 A Championship was the inaugural season of the A Championship in Ireland. The league featured 16 teams. UCD A were the inaugural champions, Cork City A won the Shield competition and Mervue United were promoted to the First Division after a play off.

Location of teams in 2008 A Championship

== A Championship Shield ==
Between March and June the twelve League of Ireland Premier Division reserve teams competed in the A Championship Shield. Mervue United, Salthill Devon and Tullamore Town did not play in the Shield as they were still playing in their previous junior/intermediate leagues which operated as winter leagues. This resulted in an overlap with the A Championship which operated as a summer league. The twelve teams were divided into four regionalised groups with the group winners then qualifying for the semi-finals.

Group Stage

| Group A | Group B | Group C | Group D |
|---|---|---|---|
| Cork City A | Bray Wanderers A | Bohemians A | Finn Harps A |
| Cobh Ramblers A | St Patrick's Athletic A | Drogheda United A | Derry City A |
| Galway United A | UCD A | Shamrock Rovers A | Sligo Rovers A |

Semi-finals

| ? May 2008 | Finn Harps A | 0–1 (a.e.t.) | Bohemians A |

| May 25, 2008 | Cork City A | 3–2 | Bray Wanderers A | Bishopstown Stadium |

Final

| 2 June 2008 | Cork City A | 2–0 | Bohemians A | Buckley Park |
| | Tierney; Meyler (pen) |

== Regular season ==
The regular season saw the twelve League of Ireland Premier Division reserve teams joined by Limerick 37 A plus the first teams of Mervue United, Salthill Devon and Tullamore Town. The format saw the sixteen teams split into two groups of eight, divided roughly into southern and northern groups. The two groups used a traditional round-robin format. The two group winners, UCD A and Bohemians A, then played off in a final. UCD won the inaugural title. As the highest placed non-reserve team, Mervue United qualified for a promotion/relegation play-off and after defeating Kildare County, they were promoted to the League of Ireland First Division.

=== Group 1 ===
==== Teams ====
| Team | Base | Manager | Stadium |
|---|---|---|---|
| Bohemians A | Phibsborough | | AUL Complex |
| Derry City A | Derry | | Brandywell Stadium |
| Drogheda United A | Drogheda | | United Park |
| Finn Harps A | Ballybofey | | Finn Park |
| Mervue United | Galway | (Republic of Ireland) Johnny Glynn | Fahy's Field |
| Salthill Devon | Salthill | (Republic of Ireland) Emlyn Long | Drom Soccer Park |
| Shamrock Rovers A | Drumcondra | | Tolka Park |
| Sligo Rovers A | Sligo | | Showgrounds |

==== Final table ====
| Pos | Team | Pld | W | D | L | GF | GA | GD | Pts | Promotion or qualification |
|---|---|---|---|---|---|---|---|---|---|---|
| 1 | Bohemians A | 14 | 11 | 2 | 1 | 34 | 12 | +22 | 32 (Note: Bohemians A and Drogheda United A were both deducted 3 points for fielding ineligible players.) | A Championship play-off final |
| 2 | Finn Harps A | 14 | 9 | 1 | 4 | 24 | 12 | +12 | 28 | |
| 3 | Mervue United (P) | 14 | 6 | 2 | 6 | 24 | 24 | 0 | 20 | Promoted to First Division after play-off |
| 4 | Drogheda United A | 14 | 5 | 5 | 4 | 23 | 23 | 0 | 17 | |
| 5 | Shamrock Rovers A | 14 | 4 | 4 | 6 | 23 | 22 | +1 | 16 | |
| 6 | Sligo Rovers A | 14 | 4 | 3 | 7 | 24 | 23 | +1 | 15 | |
| 7 | Derry City A | 14 | 4 | 1 | 9 | 16 | 34 | −18 | 13 | |
| 8 | Salthill Devon | 14 | 3 | 2 | 9 | 13 | 31 | −18 | 11 | |

Source: www.rsssf.com
Rules for classification: 1) points; 2) goal difference; 3) number of goals scored.
(P) Promoted

==== Results ====
| Home \ Away | BOH | DER | DRO | FHA | MER | SAL | SHA | SLI |
|---|---|---|---|---|---|---|---|---|
| Bohemians A | | 1–0 | 3–2 | 4–1 | 4–0 | 2–0 | 3–1 | 3–1 |
| Derry City A | 1–1 | | 1–3 | 1–1 | 1–3 | 4–0 | 0–0 | 3–0 |
| Drogheda United A | 1–1 | 1–0 | | 0–2 | 1–1 | 2–2 | 1–0 | 5–1 |
| Finn Harps A | 1–3 | 0–1 | 4–0 | | 3–1 | 1–0 | 1–0 | 2–0 |
| Mervue United | 1–2 | 5–4 | 1–1 | 0–3 | | 1–2 | 4–0 | 2–0 |
| Salthill Devon | 0–3 | 3–1 | 0–1 | 0–1 | 0–4 | | 2–2 | 3–1 |
| Shamrock Rovers A | 2–0 | 4–3 | 4–4 | 2–0 | 0–1 | 6–0 | | 2–2 |
| Sligo Rovers A | 1–4 | 1–4 | 3–1 | 0–4 | 3–0 | 2–1 | 1–0 | |

Legend: Blue = home team win; Yellow = draw; Red = away team win.

=== Group 2 ===
==== Teams ====
| Team | Base | Manager | Stadium |
|---|---|---|---|
| Bray Wanderers A | Bray | | Jackson Park |
| Cobh Ramblers A | Cobh | | St Colman's Park |
| Cork City A | Cork | | Turner's Cross |
| Galway United A | Galway | | Athenry |
| Limerick 37 A | Limerick | | Jackman Park |
| St Patrick's Athletic A | Inchicore | | Richmond Park |
| Tullamore Town | Tullamore | (Republic of Ireland) Keith Colsh | Leah Victoria Park |
| UCD A | Belfield | | UCD Bowl |

==== Final table ====
| Pos | Team | Pld | W | D | L | GF | GA | GD | Pts | Qualification |
|---|---|---|---|---|---|---|---|---|---|---|
| 1 | UCD A | 14 | 10 | 3 | 1 | 52 | 8 | +44 | 33 | A Championship play-off final |
| 2 | Cork City A | 14 | 7 | 3 | 4 | 22 | 13 | +9 | 24 | |
| 3 | Galway United A | 14 | 6 | 4 | 4 | 20 | 14 | +6 | 22 | |
| 4 | Bray Wanderers A | 14 | 6 | 3 | 5 | 31 | 20 | +11 | 21 | |
| 5 | St Patrick's Athletic A | 14 | 5 | 4 | 5 | 16 | 16 | 0 | 19 | |
| 6 | Cobh Ramblers A | 14 | 6 | 2 | 6 | 24 | 25 | −1 | 17 (Note: Cobh Ramblers A were deducted 3 points for fielding an ineligible player.) | |
| 7 | Limerick 37 A | 14 | 4 | 2 | 8 | 17 | 33 | −16 | 14 | |
| 8 | Tullamore Town | 14 | 1 | 1 | 12 | 7 | 60 | −53 | 4 | |

Source: www.rsssf.com
Rules for classification: 1) points; 2) goal difference; 3) number of goals scored.

==== Results ====
| Home \ Away | BRW | COB | COR | GAL | L37 | StP | TUL | UCD |
|---|---|---|---|---|---|---|---|---|
| Bray Wanderers A | | 3–4 | 1–0 | 2–2 | 3–0 | 4–0 | 9–0 | 1–5 |
| Cobh Ramblers A | 2–0 | | 0–3 (Note: The match was awarded 3-0 to Cork City A after Cobh Ramblers A forfeited the game.) | 1–2 | 6–0 | 1–1 | 3–0 | 0–3 (Note: The match was awarded 3-0 to UCD A after Cobh Ramblers A forfeited the game.) |
| Cork City A | 1–0 | 2–1 | | 0–2 | 3–1 | 0–0 | 8–1 | 0–5 |
| Galway United A | 3–0 (Note: The match was awarded 3-0 to Galway United A after Bray Wanderers A forfeited the game.) | 2–2 | 0–0 | | 1–0 | 2–0 | 4–0 | 1–1 |
| Limerick 37 A | 1–2 | 1–2 | 0–1 | 1–0 | | 1–1 | 3–1 | 4–3 |
| St Patrick's Athletic A | 0–0 | 2–0 | 2–0 | 2–0 | 0–4 | | 3–0 | 0–2 |
| Tullamore Town | 1–5 | 1–2 | 0–4 | 2–1 | 1–1 | 0–4 | | 0–8 |
| UCD A | 1–1 | 5–0 | 0–0 | 3–0 | 9–0 | 2–1 | 5–0 | |

Legend: Blue = home team win; Yellow = draw; Red = away team win.

== Play-Offs ==
=== A Championship Final ===
Bohemians A and UCD A competed in a playoff to decide the overall A Championship title. UCD A won 2–1.

| 11 November 2008 | UCD A | 2 – 1 (a.e.t.) | Bohemians A | UCD Bowl |
| 19.45 GMT | D. McMillan 85'; E. McMillan 107' | | Madden 37'; Ryan (red card); Ennis (red card) |

=== Promotion/Relegation ===
Kildare County and Mervue United, the highest ranked non-reserve team from the A Championship, played off to see who would play in the 2009 First Division.

| 18 November 2008 | Mervue United | 2 – 2 | Kildare County | Fahy's Field |
| 20:00 | Keogh 10'; Goldbey 28' | | Hughes 54' 76' | Referee: Pádraig Sutton (Clare) |

| 21 November 2008 | Kildare County | 0 – 3 | Mervue United | Station Road |
| 19:45 | | | O'Brien 15'; Goldbey 64' 81' | Referee: Sean Grant (Wexford) |

Mervue United won 5–2 on aggregate and were promoted to the First Division.

== See also ==
- 2008 League of Ireland Premier Division
- 2008 League of Ireland First Division
- 2008 League of Ireland Cup
