= A Championship =

- Founded: 2008
- Folded: 2011
- Country: (Republic of Ireland) Ireland
- Level on pyramid: 3
- Promotion to: League of Ireland First Division
- Domestic cup: FAI Cup
- League cup(s): A Championship Cup; A Championship Shield; League of Ireland Cup
- Last champions: Derry City A
- Most championships: UCD A (2 titles)

The A Championship, also known as the Newstalk A Championship for sponsorship reasons, was an association football league featuring League of Ireland reserve teams and emerging senior teams. Established in 2008, the A Championship formed the third level in the Republic of Ireland football league system. The league was disbanded following the 2011 season and was effectively absorbed into the League of Ireland U19 Division.

Between 2009 and 2011 the league was sponsored by Newstalk.

== History ==
The idea of forming a regionalised A Championship was first proposed in 2006 as part of plan to reorganise the League of Ireland as a four tier structure. When the A Championship was founded in 2008, thirteen of the sixteen inaugural members were the reserve teams of League of Ireland clubs. The other three teams were Mervue United, Salthill Devon and Tullamore Town. Sporting Fingal were also expected to join the A Championship for the 2008 season. However, when Kilkenny City withdrew from the First Division shortly before the season was due to start, Sporting Fingal were drafted in to replace them.

The A Championship eventually kicked off in 2008 and UCD A became the inaugural champions. Despite not defending their title in 2009, UCD subsequently went on to become the A Championship's most successful team. They were champions again in 2010 and then runners-up in 2011. Two other reserve teams, Shamrock Rovers A and Derry City A finished as champions in 2009 and 2011 respectively.

The 2009 season featured six non-reserve teams. After Mervue United gained promotion to the First Division, Salthill Devon and Tullamore Town were joined by Cobh Ramblers, Castlebar Celtic, F.C. Carlow and Tralee Dynamos. The latter three were all making their debut at senior national level. They were also the first clubs from their respective counties of Mayo, Carlow and Kerry to play at this level. Castlebar Celtic and Tullamore Town both withdraw following the conclusion of the 2010 season but among their replacements were Fanad United. The non-reserve teams also represented the A Championship in the League of Ireland Cup and the FAI Cup.

At the League of Ireland clubs' annual convention in 2009, Dundalk called for the A Championship to be scrapped, arguing that it was putting an unwelcome financial burden on participating clubs. At the same convention, Waterford United proposed that it should be optional rather than compulsory for senior sides to field a reserve team in the league. Drogheda United also raised concerns about the "unacceptable level" of refereeing. According to a report in the Irish Independent, one club — short of two players for an away match — paid two locals to make up their team while a number of fixtures were postponed because clubs did not have enough players.

Following the conclusion of the 2011 season, the A Championship was absorbed into the League of Ireland U19 Division. Cobh Ramblers and Tralee Dynamos both unsuccessfully applied to join the 2012 League of Ireland First Division. Ramblers did however join the First Division in 2013 and Dynamos, together with Fanad United, joined the U19 Division. In 2013 Shamrock Rovers entered their reserve team in the First Division.

== Format ==
The A Championship format saw the members of the league split into two groups, divided roughly into southern and northern groups. The two groups used a traditional round-robin format. In 2008, 2009 and 2010, the two group winners played off in a final. In 2011 the two group runners-up also qualified for the title play-off. A promotion and relegation system operated between the League of Ireland Premier Division, the League of Ireland First Division and the A Championship. Reserve teams were ineligible for promotion but the highest placed non-reserve teams qualified for a promotion/relegation play-off against a First Division team providing they finished in the top three of their group. Mervue United in 2008 and Salthill Devon in 2009 were both promoted to the First Division. In contrast Cobh Ramblers were relegated directly from the 2008 Premier Division to the 2009 A Championship after they failed to obtain a First Division license.

== List of finals ==
Season	Winner	Results	Runners-up	Venue
2008	UCD A	2–1	Bohemians A	UCD Bowl
2009	Shamrock Rovers A	1–0	Salthill Devon	Drom Soccer Park
2010	UCD A	2–1	Bohemians A	UCD Bowl
2011	Derry City A	3–2	UCD A	Brandywell Stadium

== Related competitions ==
=== A Championship Shield ===
Season	Winner	Result	Runner-up	Venue
2008	Cork City A	3–2	Bohemians A	Buckley Park

=== A Championship Cup ===
Season	Winner	Result	Runner-up	Venue
2010	Sporting Fingal A	3–2	Bohemians A	Dalymount Park

== Teams ==
Key:
Reserve team Youth team Junior club
Team promoted

Team	Home town/suburb	Ground	Seasons
Bohemians A	Phibsborough	AUL Complex; Dalymount Park	2008–11
Bray Wanderers A	Bray	Jackson Park	2008–11
F.C. Carlow	County Carlow	The Valley; The Meadows	2009–11
Castlebar Celtic	Castlebar	Celtic Park	2009–10
Cobh Ramblers (Note: Cobh Ramblers fielded their reserve team in the 2008 season and their first team during the latter three seasons.)	Cobh	St Colman's Park	2008–11
Cork City A	Cork	Turner's Cross	2008–09
Derry City A	Derry	Brandywell Stadium	2008–09; 2011
Drogheda United A	Drogheda	United Park	2008–11
Dundalk A	Dundalk	Oriel Park	2009–11
Fanad United	Fanad	Traigh-a-Loch	2011
Finn Harps A	Ballybofey	Finn Park	2008–11
Galway United A	Galway	Athenry; Castle Park	2008–11
Limerick A (Note: Limerick A played as Limerick 37 A during the 2008 season.)	Limerick	Jackman Park; Riverside Park; Aisling-Annacotty Grounds	2008; 2010–11
Mervue United	Galway	Fahy's Field	2008
St Patrick's Athletic A	Inchicore	Richmond Park	2008–11
Salthill Devon	Salthill	Drom Soccer Park	2008–09
Shamrock Rovers A	Drumcondra; Tallaght	Tolka Park; Tallaght Stadium	2008–11
Shelbourne A	Drumcondra	Tolka Park	2010
Sligo Rovers A	Sligo	Showgrounds; Sligo IT Grounds	2008–11
Sporting Fingal A	Fingal	ALSAA Sports Complex	2009–10
Tralee Dynamos	Tralee	Cahermoneen	2009–11
Tullamore Town	Tullamore	Leah Victoria Park	2008–10
UCD A	Belfield	UCD Bowl	2008; 2010–11

== See also ==
- 2010 A Championship Cup
