= 2008 League of Ireland Premier Division =

League of Ireland Premier Division
- Season: 2008
- Champions: Bohemians (10th title)
- Relegated: Finn Harps; Cobh Ramblers; UCD
- UEFA Champions League: Bohemians
- UEFA Europa League: St Patrick's Athletic; Derry City; Sligo Rovers
- Setanta Cup: Bohemians; St Patrick's Athletic; Derry City; Sligo Rovers
- Matches: 198
- Goals: 440 (2.22 per match)
- Top goalscorer: David Mooney: 15 (Cork City); Mark Quigley: 15 (St Patrick's Athletic); Mark Farren: 15 (Derry City)
- Biggest home win: Cork City v Cobh Ramblers 5-0 (20 June 2008)
- Biggest away win: Cobh Ramblers v Drogheda United 0-4 31 May 2008; Galway United v Derry City 0-4 (25 July 2008)
- Highest scoring: Bray Wanderers v Drogheda United 4-3 (7 November 2008)

The 2008 League of Ireland Premier Division was the 24th season of the League of Ireland Premier Division. The division was made up of 12 teams. Bohemians were champions while St Patrick's Athletic finished as runners-up.

== Club information ==
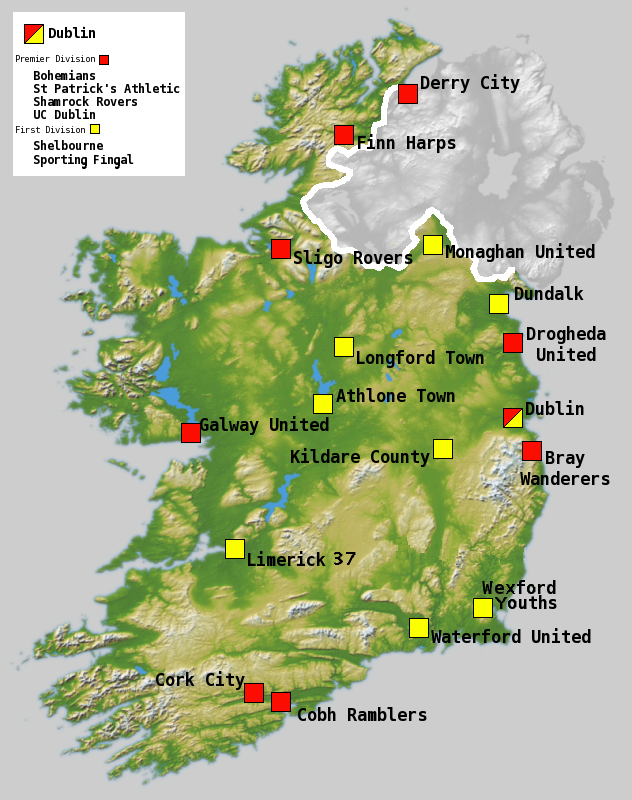
The clubs competing in the 2008 FAI eircom League of Ireland

Team	Base	Manager	Main sponsor	Kit supplier	Stadium	Capacity
Bohemians	Phibsborough	(Republic of Ireland) Pat Fenlon	Des Kelly Interiors	Umbro	Dalymount Park	8,500
Bray Wanderers	Bray	(Republic of Ireland) Eddie Gormley	Hard Metal	Umbro	Carlisle Grounds	7,000
Cobh Ramblers	Cobh	(Republic of Ireland) Stephen Henderson	Goodyear	Uhlsport	St. Colman's Park	5,000
Cork City	Cork	(Republic of Ireland) Alan Mathews	Beamish	Hummel	Turners Cross	8,000
Derry City	Derry	(Republic of Ireland) Stephen Kenny	MeteorElectrical.com	O'Neills	Brandywell Stadium	7,700
Drogheda United	Drogheda	(Republic of Ireland) Paul Doolin	Hunky Dorys	Jako	United Park	5,400
Finn Harps	Ballybofey	(Republic of Ireland) Paul Hegarty	Donegal Creameries	Masita	Finn Park	7,900
Galway United	Galway	(England) Ian Foster	O'Connell Drylining Ltd	Rival	Terryland Park	5,000
Shamrock Rovers	Drumcondra	(Northern Ireland) Michael O'Neill	Woodie's DIY	Umbro	Tolka Park	9,700
Sligo Rovers	Sligo	(England) Paul Cook	Toher's	Jako	The Showgrounds	5,500
St Patrick's Athletic	Inchicore	(Republic of Ireland) Jeff Kenna	Paddy Power	Umbro	Richmond Park	5,500
UCD	Belfield	(Republic of Ireland) Pete Mahon	Budweiser	O'Neills	UCD Bowl	3,000

== Overview ==
The regular season began on 7 March and concluded on 14 November. Each team played the other teams three times, totaling 33 games. Bohemians finished the season as champions, winning by a margin of nineteen points. There was no promotion/relegation play-off between Premier Division and First Division teams. This was because the 2009 Premier Division would be reduced to 10 clubs. This saw three clubs relegated out of the Premier Division.

For the first time in the history of the league the national broadcaster Raidió Teilifís Éireann started showing highlights of every Premier Division game played on its new show Monday Night Soccer. This show was presented by Con Murphy. This replaced eircom League Weekly which had run on TV3 on Monday nights from 2002 to 2007. The final season of live weekly radio coverage was provided by national broadcaster RTÉ with live reports and commentary on match nights, which was dropped from the end of 2008. Live games were shown by RTÉ, Setanta Sports and TG4's Sacar Beo.

== Final table ==
Pos	Team	Pld	W	D	L	GF	GA	GD	Pts	Qualification or relegation
1	Bohemians (C)	33	27	4	2	55	13	+42	85	Qualification to Champions League second qualifying round
2	St Patrick's Athletic	33	20	6	7	48	24	+24	66	Qualification to Europa League second qualifying round
3	Derry City	33	16	10	7	46	25	+21	58	Qualification to Europa League second qualifying round
4	Sligo Rovers	33	12	12	9	41	28	+13	48	Qualification to Europa League first qualifying round
5	Cork City (Note: Cork City were deducted ten points after going into administration.)	33	15	11	7	45	28	+17	46	
6	Bray Wanderers	33	11	6	16	28	52	−24	39	
7	Shamrock Rovers	33	8	13	12	33	35	−2	37	
8	Drogheda United (Note: Drogheda United were deducted ten points after going into administration.)	33	12	9	12	38	32	+6	35	
9	Galway United	33	8	8	17	34	49	−15	32	
10	Finn Harps (R)	33	9	4	20	26	53	−27	31	Relegation to League of Ireland First Division
11	Cobh Ramblers (R)	33	6	8	19	27	55	−28	26	Relegation to A Championship (Note: Cobh Ramblers were relegated directly from the Premier Division to the A Championship after being refused a First Division licence.)
12	UCD (R)	33	4	9	20	19	46	−27	21	Relegation to League of Ireland First Division

Rules for classification: 1) points; 2) goal difference; 3) number of goals scored.
(C) Champions; (R) Relegated

== Results ==
=== Matches 1–22 ===
Home \ Away	BOH	BRW	COB	COR	DER	DRO	FHA	GAL	SHM	SLI	StP	UCD
Bohemians	—	1–1	3–0	2–1	0–0	2–0	3–0	2–1	2–1	3–0	0–1	2–0
Bray Wanderers	0–2	—	1–0	0–3	1–0	1–0	1–0	0–1	1–0	0–0	0–3	0–2
Cobh Ramblers	0–1	1–2	—	0–0	0–3	0–4	1–3	1–1	2–0	1–3	0–1	0–0
Cork City	0–1	0–0	5–0	—	1–1	0–2	3–0	3–2	1–1	1–0	0–0	1–0
Derry City	0–0	4–0	1–0	2–3	—	2–0	2–1	0–0	0–1	0–0	0–3	4–1
Drogheda United	1–2	2–0	3–0	0–1	0–1	—	1–0	1–0	0–1	1–1	2–2	2–1
Finn Harps	0–2	1–0	2–1	0–1	0–2	1–3	—	0–2	1–1	0–1	0–3	1–0
Galway United	0–1	2–3	0–1	1–3	0–4	0–1	2–2	—	0–2	1–1	2–2	1–2
Shamrock Rovers	0–1	2–0	0–0	1–1	1–1	0–0	0–2	3–1	—	1–0	0–1	1–1
Sligo Rovers	1–2	3–0	3–1	0–1	0–0	0–0	4–1	3–0	3–2	—	1–2	0–0
St Patrick's Athletic	0–1	1–1	1–0	3–2	0–1	0–1	5–1	1–0	1–1	3–1	—	0–0
UCD	1–1	2–2	1–1	0–2	2–3	1–3	1–0	0–1	0–2	0–0	0–3	—

Source: soccerway.com
Legend: Blue = home team win; Yellow = draw; Red = away team win.

=== Matches 23–33 ===
Home \ Away	BOH	BRW	COB	COR	DER	DRO	FHA	GAL	SHM	SLI	StP	UCD
Bohemians	—	2–1	—	3–1	0–1	—	3–0	—	—	—	3–0	—
Bray Wanderers	—	—	3–2	—	2–1	4–3	0–1	—	—	—	0–1	2–1
Cobh Ramblers	0–2	—	—	1–1	—	—	—	4–1	1–0	—	—	2–0
Cork City	—	3–0	—	—	1–1	0–0	1–1	—	—	0–0	—	2–0
Derry City	—	—	4–2	—	—	0–1	1–0	2–0	—	1–1	—	—
Drogheda United	1–2	—	0–0	—	—	—	1–2	1–1	1–1	—	0–2	—
Finn Harps	—	—	2–2	—	—	—	—	—	2–0	0–2	0–1	2–0
Galway United	0–2	4–0	—	3–2	—	—	3–0	—	1–1	—	—	—
Shamrock Rovers	1–2	2–2	—	3–0	1–1	—	—	—	—	—	1–3	1–1
Sligo Rovers	0–1	2–0	4–0	—	—	3–3	—	1–1	2–1	—	—	—
St Patrick's Athletic	—	—	0–3	0–1	2–1	—	—	0–1	—	1–0	—	2–0
UCD	0–1	—	—	—	1–2	1–0	—	0–1	—	0–1	—	—

Source: soccerway.com
Legend: Blue = home team win; Yellow = draw; Red = away team win.

== Top scorers ==
Goalscorers	Goals	Team
(Republic of Ireland) David Mooney	15	Cork City
(Republic of Ireland) Mark Quigley	15	St Patrick's Athletic
(Republic of Ireland) Mark Farren	15	Derry City
(Republic of Ireland) Killian Brennan	11	Bohemians

== See also ==
- 2008 League of Ireland First Division
- 2008 League of Ireland Cup
- 2008 A Championship
