= Shamrock Rovers F.C. II =

Association football reserve club in Tallaght, Ireland

Shamrock Rovers II
- Full name: Shamrock Rovers II
- Founded: 2020
- Dissolved: 2021
- Ground: Tallaght Stadium
- Chairman: Jonathan Roche
- League: League of Ireland First Division
- 2020: 8th
- Website: www.shamrockrovers.ie
Home colours	Away colours

Shamrock Rovers II was the reserve team of Shamrock Rovers. Throughout its history Rovers have entered reserve teams in various leagues including the Leinster Senior League, the League of Ireland B Division, the A Championship and the League of Ireland First Division.

== History ==
=== Leinster Senior League ===
Between the 1920s and the 1960s Shamrock Rovers B played in the Leinster Senior League. They were the Senior Division champions twice, in 1924–25 and 1939–40. On both occasions Jimmy Dunne played a leading role. In 1924–25 the young Jimmy Dunne was kept out of the Rovers first team by the legendary forward-line known as the "Four F's" – Billy Farrell, Bob Fullam, John Fagan and John Joe Flood. However Dunne played regularly for the reserve team, helping them win both the Leinster Senior League and the LFA Metropolitan Cup, the league cup of the Leinster Senior League. During the 1939–40 season Dunne was the team's player-coach. Once again Rovers B completed a double by also winning the LFA Metropolitan Cup. Rovers B also won the Metropolitan Cup on six further occasions.

=== League of Ireland B Division ===
Between 1964–65 and 2004–05, Shamrock Rovers B played in the League of Ireland B Division. Together with Home Farm, Bray Wanderers, Athlone Town and the reserve teams of Shelbourne, Bohemians, St Patrick's Athletic, Dundalk, Drumcondra and Drogheda, they had been founding members of the B Division in 1964–65. In 1967–68 Shamrock Rovers B won the Blackthorn Trophy which was awarded to the overall winners of the league. Rovers B went on to win three more league titles in 1984–85, 1986–87 and 1995–96.

=== A Championship ===
Between 2008 and 2011, Rovers' reserve team competed in the A Championship. Because of the name of the league, the team was referred to as Shamrock Rovers A. The team was managed by Andrew Myler. With Myler in charge Rovers won the 2009 A Championship and the 2010 League of Ireland U20 Division.

=== League of Ireland First Division 2014 ===
In December 2013 Rovers received permission from the Football Association of Ireland to enter a team in the 2014 League of Ireland First Division under the name Shamrock Rovers B. They took the place vacated after Mervue United and Salthill Devon withdrew from the league to make way for Galway F.C. However, after a disappointing season, during which they finished sixth, the club decided it was not financially viable to continue in the league and they subsequently withdrew. Rovers B were replaced in the 2015 First Division by Cabinteely.

=== 2020 Return to First Division ===
An announcement was made in January 2020 that a team using the name Shamrock Rovers II would be entering that seasons League of Ireland First Division. The club finished in 8th place under manager Aidan Price. On 20 February 2021 it was announced that Shamrock Rovers II would not participate in the 2021 League of Ireland First Division, as the Football Association of Ireland opted to replace the team with newly formed Limerick club Treaty United. This left Rovers II and newly formed Dublin County without a place in the league, despite Rovers II passing the league's licensing procedure.

== Honours ==
- Leinster Senior League: 2
  - 1924–25, 1939–40 ^{See Note 1}
- LFA Metropolitan Cup: 8
  - 1924–25, 1927–28, 1934–35, 1939–40, 1946–47, 1947–48, 1948–49, 1949–50
- League of Ireland B Division: 4
  - 1967–68, 1984–85, 1986–87, 1995–96
- Castrol Cup
  - 1972-73
- A Championship: 1
  - 2009
- League of Ireland U20 Division: 1
  - 2010

Notes

- ^1 Shamrock Rovers senior team also won this league in 1921-22

== Managers ==
- (Republic of Ireland) Jimmy Dunne 1939–40
- (Republic of Ireland) Andrew Myler 2009–11
- (Republic of Ireland) Colin Hawkins 2014
- (Republic of Ireland) Aidan Price 2020
