= Tralee Dynamos A.F.C. =

- Full name: Tralee Dynamos Association Football Club
- Founded: 1961
- Ground: Cahermoneen Stadium, Tralee, County Kerry
- League: Kerry District League; League of Ireland U19 Division; A Championship; Munster Senior League
Home colours

Tralee Dynamos A.F.C. is an Irish association football club based in Tralee, County Kerry. Their senior team currently plays in the Kerry District League. They have previously fielded teams in the League of Ireland U19 Division, the A Championship, the Munster Senior League and the Limerick Desmond League. In 2009, the club made it to the fourth round of the FAI Cup.

== History ==
=== Early years ===
According to the club crest and club website, Tralee Dynamos were founded in 1961. However, the Desmond League lists the club as a founding member of their inaugural league season, which took place in 1955. Other founder members of this league included Newcastle West A.F.C. The club won their first trophy when they claimed the Murphy Cup in 1967. In 1971, Tralee Dynamos and Killarney Athletic left the Desmond League to become founder members of the Kerry District League (KDL). Tralee Dynamos were the inaugural champions of the KDL and subsequently became the league's most successful team. The club claimed their first national trophy when they won the 1997–98 FAI Youth Cup. The side, containing a young Derek O'Brien, defeated Stella Maris 2–1 in the final. The following year, the club entered a team in the 1998–99 Munster Senior League as well as the Kerry League.

=== A Championship ===
Tralee Dynamos entered the A Championship ahead of the 2009 season. In doing so, Dynamos became the first association football club from County Kerry to play in a national level league. They made their league debut on 5 April 2009, losing 0–1 to Sporting Fingal A, the reserve team of Sporting Fingal. In the same season, the club qualified for the FAI Cup for the first time. Dynamos reached the last 16 of the 2009 competition but lost to Premier Division side Bray Wanderers.

Between 2009 and 2011, Tralee Dynamos played in the A Championship.

Following the collapse of the A Championship in 2011, Tralee Dynamos applied to join League of Ireland First Division for the 2012 season. However this was unsuccessful and their senior team subsequently rejoined the Kerry District League. They also entered a team in the League of Ireland U19 Division.

== Honours ==
- Kerry District League
  - Winners: 1971–72, 1972–73, 1982–83, 1983–84, 1984–85, 1986–87, 1989–90, 1990–91, 1991–92, 1992–93, 1993–94, 1994–95, 2002–03, 2003–04, 2004–05, 2014–15 : 16
- FAI Youth Cup
  - Winners: 1997–98: 1

== See also ==
- Category:Tralee Dynamos A.F.C. players
- Kerry FC
