= Kerry District League =

Football league in Ireland

- Founded: 1971
- Country: (Republic of Ireland) Ireland
- Provincial FA: Munster Football Association
- Divisions: 6
- Number of clubs: 76 (2015–16)
- Level on pyramid: 7–12
- Domestic cup(s): MFA Champions Trophy; FAI Junior Cup; Munster Junior Cup
- League cup: Greyhound Bar KO Cup
- Current champions: Killarney Celtic (17th title) (2025–26)
- Most championships: Killarney Celtic (17 titles)
- Website: www.kerrydistrictleague.ie

The Kerry District League (known as the Denny Kerry District League for sponsorship reasons) is an association football league featuring amateur and junior clubs from County Kerry. The KDL is a winter league running from September to May. Its top division, the Premier, is a seventh level division in the Republic of Ireland football league system.

The league is regularly featured in the local newspapers – The Kerryman and the Kerry's Eye. Killarney Celtic F.C. recently won the Premier A for a seventh successive season.

== History ==
The Kerry and District League was formed in 1971 with eight teams competing in the first season. Its founding members included Tralee Dynamos and Killarney Athletic, both of whom had previously played in the Limerick Desmond League. Other founding members included St Brendan's Park. Tralee Dynamos were the inaugural champions and subsequently became the league's most successful team.

By 2016, the league had six divisions: the Premier A and Premier B, Division 1A and 1B down to Division 2A and 2B.

The 2020–21 season was cancelled due to the coronavirus pandemic. In June 2022, Sean O'Keefe was re-elected as chairman of the league.

For the 2023–24 season, the league's six divisions were the Premier A, Premier B, Division 1, 2, 3 and 4. By the 2025–26 season, the Premier A division had its name changed to the KDL Premier and the Premier B division had been renamed the KDL Championship. This season also saw a new entry to the league in the form of Kerry Blues, a newly formed team made up entirely of members from An Garda Síochána.

== League pyramid ==
The Kerry District League has six divisions. There are two underage leagues in the KDL with a Youths League for under-18 teams as well as an Under-17 League. The league also organises a women's division and an over-35 division.

As of November 2024, there is no promotion or relegation system between the Kerry District League and the Munster Senior League. Junior clubs can apply to join the intermediate ranks if they feel they are capable, starting at the lowest intermediate division. The last non-Cork side playing at intermediate level was Tralee Dynamos in the early 2000s.

Pyramid Level	League(s) / division(s)
7	KDL Premier 10 clubs – 2 relegations
8	KDL Championship 8 clubs – 2 promotions, 2 relegations
9	KDL Division 1 8 clubs – 2 promotions, 2 relegations
10	KDL Division 2 9 clubs – 2 promotions, 2 relegations
11	KDL Division 3 10 clubs – 2 promotions, 2 relegations
12	KDL Division 4 11 clubs – 2 promotions

== Mounthawk Park ==
The KDL purchased Mounthawk Park in Tralee in the mid-1990s. It now serves as both the headquarters of the league and as home ground for the Kerry League representative teams. Several KDL clubs, especially those in the greater Tralee area, also use Mounthawk Park as their home pitch. In August 2015 a new all-weather pitch was opened at Mounthawk Park by Martin O'Neill and John Delaney. It is the home ground of Kerry F.C. in the League of Ireland First Division and has a capacity of 1,200. In May 2026, a series of upgrades to Mounthawk Park were completed with a new artificial turf pitch laid, new LED floodlights installed and a new on-site gym built.

== Representative teams ==
A senior Kerry League representative team regularly competes in the Oscar Traynor Trophy, playing against teams representing other leagues. In recent seasons they have also competed in the League of Ireland Cup. In 2016, a Kerry League Under-17 team was entered into the League of Ireland U17 Division, joining the Elite Southern Division. In 2019, the Kerry League entered a team in the League of Ireland Under-13 Division. In January 2022, the KDL confirmed they had taken over the running of the Under-13 and Under-15 teams from the Kerry Schoolboys League.

== Clubs ==
=== Premier A ===
As of 2025, clubs included:

Team	Home town/suburb	Ground
Ballyheigue F.C.	Ballyheigue	
Camp United	Camp, County Kerry	
Castleisland	Castleisland	Limerick Road
Classic F.C.	Tralee	
Killarney Athletic	Killarney	Woodlawn
Killarney Celtic	Killarney	
Killorglin AFC	Killorglin	
Listowel Celtic	Listowel	
Mainebank F.C.	Castlemaine	
Tralee Dynamos	Tralee	Cahermoneen Stadium

== List of winners by season ==
Season	Winner	
2025–26	Killarney Celtic	Killarney Athletic
2024–25	Killarney Celtic	Tralee Dynamos
2023-24	Killarney Celtic	Killarney Athletic
2022-23	Killarney Celtic	Killarney Athletic
2021-22	Killarney Celtic	Killarney Athletic
2020–21	Season abandoned due to coronavirus pandemic	
2019-20	Killarney Celtic	Killarney Athletic
2018-19	Killarney Celtic	
2017-18	Killarney Celtic	
2016–17	Killarney Athletic	Killarney Celtic
2015–16	Dingle Bay Rovers	Killarney Celtic
2014–15	Tralee Dynamos	Listowel Celtic
2013–14	Castleisland	Listowel Celtic
2012–13	Killarney Celtic	St Brendan's Park
2011–12	St Brendan's Park	Castleisland
2010–11	Killarney Celtic	
2009–10	Killarney Celtic	Lisselton Rovers
2008–09	Lisselton Rovers	
2007–08	Lisselton Rovers	
2006–07	Killarney Celtic	Tralee Dynamos
2005–06	Killarney Celtic	Killarney Athletic
2004–05	Tralee Dynamos	
2003–04	Tralee Dynamos	
2002–03	Tralee Dynamos	
2001–02	St Brendan's Park	
2000–01	Listowel Celtic	
1999–00	St Brendan's Park	
1998–99	Rattoo Rovers	
1997–98	Rattoo Rovers	
1996–97	Killarney Celtic	
1995–96	Killarney Celtic	
1994–95	Tralee Dynamos	
1992–93	Tralee Dynamos	
1991–92	Tralee Dynamos	
1988–89	Listowel Celtic	
1987–88	Tralee Utd	
1986–87	Tralee Dynamos	
1985–86	Killarney Celtic	
1984–85	Tralee Dynamos	
1983–84	Tralee Dynamos	
1982–83	Tralee Dynamos	
1981–82	Killarney Celtic	
1980–81	St Brendans Park	
1979–80	Callinafercy	
1977–78	Castleisland	
1976–77	St Brendan's Park	
1975–76	St Brendan's Park	
1974–75	St Brendan's Park	
1973–74	Cahersiveen	
1972–73	Tralee Dynamos	
1971–72	Tralee Dynamos	
