= Tullamore Town F.C. =

Tullamore Town
- Full name: Tullamore Town Football Club
- Founded: 1941
- Ground: Leah Victoria Park, Tullamore, County Offaly
- Capacity: 1,000
- League: Leinster Senior League; A Championship
- Website: tullamoretownfc.com
Home colours

Tullamore Town F.C. (Irish: Cumann Peile Tulach Mhór) is an Irish association football club based in Tullamore, County Offaly, playing their home games at Leah Victoria Park. Their senior men's team competes in the Leinster Senior League. The club have qualified for the FAI Cup in 1967, 2004 and 2010. They have also previously played in the A Championship and the League of Ireland B Division.

Their under-19 and under-17 men's teams play in the Combined Counties Football League, as do their under-17 women's team. The club previously played their home games at Terry Adams Park.

== History ==
Tullamore Town Football Club was founded in 1941. By 1967, the club were playing in the League of Ireland B Division. Tullamore qualified for the 1966–67 FAI Cup but lost to Bohemians in the first round. Former League of Ireland player Ray Keogh became player-manager and led the team to the 1970–71 FAI Intermediate Cup as well as a League of Ireland B Division title. Tullamore suffered an 8–0 defeat to UCD in 1979 and finished bottom of the 1980–81 table but improved to finishes of third and fifth in the 1983–84 and 1984–85 seasons respectively.

Tullamore made it to the second round of the 2004 FAI Cup, losing 3–0 to Athlone Town. In September 2007, the club left their home at Terry Adams Park and moved to a €7million facility at Leah Victoria Park. When the A Championship was founded in 2008, Tullamore became one of the sixteen inaugural members along with fellow junior clubs Mervue United and Salthill Devon. Under manager Mark Dempsey, the club finished sixth in the 2009 A Championship. In the 2010 FAI Cup, the club beat Cherry Orchard and Fairview Rangers, making it as far as the third round before losing 1–3 to Salthill Devon. For the 2010–11 season, the club also entered a team in the Leinster Senior League's Major 1 Sunday division.

In 2021, Tullamore announced they would be fielding senior, under-19 and under-17 teams in both the Combined Counties Football League and the Leinster Senior League for the 2021–22 season. In July 2026, the club submitted a planning application to Offaly County Council for an extension of an existing artificial turf pitch and the laying of a second AstroTurf surface with floodlights at Leah Victoria Park.

== Club identity ==
Tullamore Town's club crest depicts a phoenix rising from the flames. The team's kit colours are blue and white.

== Honours ==
- FAI Intermediate Cup: 1
  - 1970–71
- Leinster Senior League Tom Cullen Cup: 2
  - 2013–14, 2014–15

== 2015–16 squad ==
Note: Flags indicate national team as defined under FIFA eligibility rules; some limited exceptions apply. Players may hold more than one non-FIFA nationality.

No.	Pos.	Nation	Player
—	GK	EIR	Alan O'Connell
—	DF	EIR	Trevor Moylan
—	DF	EIR	Brian Norris
—	DF	EIR	Ken Doyle
—	DF	EIR	Rory Condron
—	MF	EIR	Enda Carroll
—	MF	EIR	Willy Ray
—	FW	EIR	MacDarragh O'Neill
—	FW	EIR	Brian Francis
—	FW	EIR	Shane Dolan

No.	Pos.	Nation	Player
—	MF	EIR	Stephen Francis
—	FW	EIR	Brian Gill
—	FW	EIR	Robert Bracken
—	DF	EIR	Ross Kinnarney
—	MF	EIR	Kevin Minnock
—	FW	EIR	Derek Coolahan
—	DF	EIR	Aaron Moore
—	GK	EIR	Gavin Shiel
—	GK	EIR	Cain Brereton
—	DF	EIR	Johnathan Duffy

== Notable former players ==
Republic of Ireland women's internationals

- (Republic of Ireland) Sylvia Gee

Republic of Ireland B internationals

- (Republic of Ireland) Seamus Kelly

== Staff and board members ==
- President : (Republic of Ireland) Mr P Nicholson
- Chairman: (Republic of Ireland) Mr Alan Kelly
- Club Secretary : (Republic of Ireland) Mr Daniel O'Brien
- Treasurer : (Republic of Ireland) Mr Stephen Kelleher
- First team Manager: (Republic of Ireland) Sam Tuohy
