= Leah Victoria Park =

Irish football ground in Tullamore

- Interactive map of Leah Victoria Park
- Location: Tullamore, County Offaly, Ireland
- Coordinates: 53°17′17.47248″N 7°31′30.3294″W
- Capacity: 2,300
- Surface: Grass

Construction
- Opened: 2008
- Cost: €7,000,000

Tenant
- Tullamore Town F.C. (Leinster Senior League Sunday Major Division)

Leah Victoria Park is an Irish football ground situated in Tullamore, County Offaly. It is the home of Tullamore Town F.C. The ground has three pitches in total, two which are of international standard and an all-weather pitch.
