= St Colman's Park =

Football stadium in Cobh, Ireland

- Interactive map of St Colman's Park
- Location: Cobh, County Cork; Ireland
- Coordinates: 51°51′07″N 08°18′05″W
- Owner: Football Association of Ireland (FAI)
- Capacity: c. 4,000
- Surface: Artificial
- Public transit: Cobh railway station

Construction
- Opened: 1968

Tenant
- Cobh Ramblers

St Colman's Park is a football stadium in Cobh, County Cork in Ireland. Owned by the Football Association of Ireland, it is home to Cobh Ramblers F.C. of the League of Ireland First Division.

== Development ==
First opened in the 1960s, the stadium was redeveloped during the mid-2000s. The club claim to have moved to the ground in 1954. Construction on a new changing facility and press office along with a new chairman's office was completed in 2006 along with new floodlights and a 900-seater stand replacing the old shed. The east stand, too was improved with 450 new seats being installed. A new surface was also added prior to the clubs admission to the Eircom/Airtricity League Premier Division in 2009.

In December 2023, work began to replace the grass pitch with an artificial turf pitch. The new artificial pitch and floodlights were completed in April 2024.

== Ownership ==
The ground was originally owned by Cobh Ramblers. In January 2009, the club's members proposed selling St Colman's Park to the Football Association of Ireland (FAI) in order to clear the club's debts. The club would then lease the ground back and continue to play at the venue. Although the FAI initially declined to purchase the ground, they later agreed to a leaseback arrangement. In July 2021, Cobh Ramblers agreed a new 99-year lease with the FAI for St Colman's Park.

== Use ==
In addition to use by Cobh Ramblers, the stadium has hosted international underage games including games in the 1994 UEFA European Under-16 Football Championship qualifiers. Munster Schools Senior Cup games have also been staged at the stadium including the final which was won by local Cobh school, Coláiste Muire in 2010.
