= UCD Bowl =

Stadium in Dublin, Ireland

- The Bowl
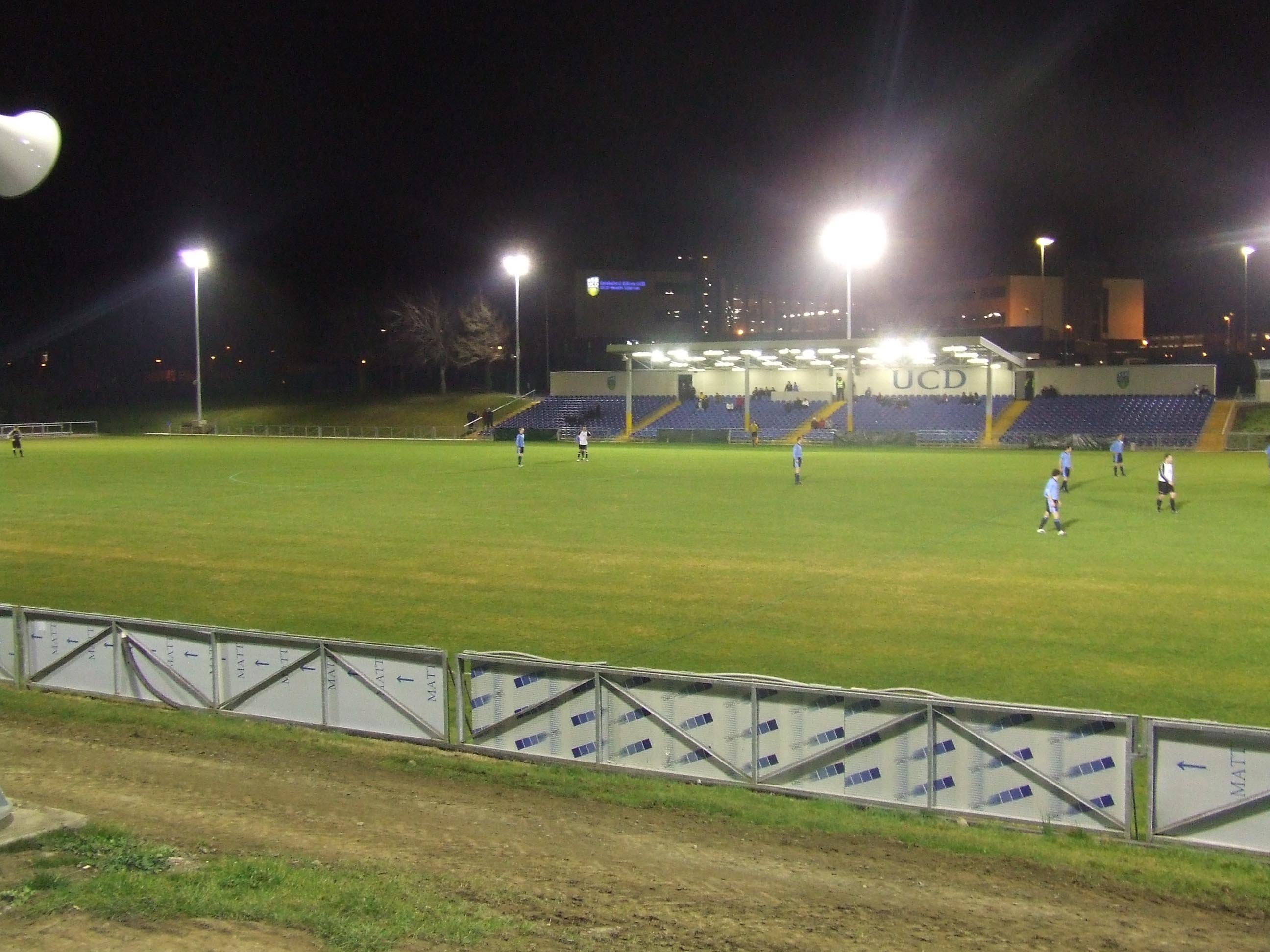

- Location within Dublin
- Address: Belfield
- Location: Dublin, Ireland
- Coordinates: 53°18′37″N 6°13′41″W
- Owner: University College Dublin
- Capacity: 3,000 (1,500 seated)
- Surface: Grass
- Field size: 100 by 60 yards (91 by 55 m)
- Public transit: Sydney Parade railway station Stillorgan Road / Nutley Lane bus stop

Construction
- Built: 1936
- Renovated: 2007; 19 years ago

Tenants
- University College Dublin R.F.C. (All Ireland League); University College Dublin A.F.C. (League of Ireland) 2007–present

The UCD Bowl, also known as the Belfield Bowl, is a rugby union and football stadium in Dún Laoghaire–Rathdown, Ireland. It is the home ground of University College Dublin R.F.C. in the AIB All Ireland League and League of Ireland First Division side University College Dublin A.F.C. It has also hosted training sessions for the Ireland national rugby union team and various touring international teams including the All Blacks. It was one of the venues for the 2017 Women's Rugby World Cup.

With its redevelopment complete, the ground has capacity for 3,000 people, including 1,500 seats. It is located to the north of the Belfield campus beside the National hockey stadium, near the Sports Centre. There is a single stand on the southern side of the stadium with uncovered standing room at each end. 860 seats in the stand are covered.

== Redevelopment ==
The playing grounds at Belfield were officially opened with match against Monkstown in 1936. A substantial programme of improvements to the Bowl was started in 2007 after a decision was made to move the UCD football team from their home in Belfield Park as the Bowl would not meet the requirements of UEFA licensing for the League of Ireland. The redevelopment was confirmed in 2006 after a €1.25 million Sports Capital grant was allocated to the work and objections to planning were overruled. The seated capacity increased from 860 to 1,500 and a hard surface laid to allow standing capacity around the pitch. Floodlights, improved fencing around the stadium and facilities for shops, toilets and turnstiles were also added. The work was finished in late 2007 in time for the 2008 League of Ireland season. Planning permission has been applied for to replace the current roof with a cantilever structure which will cover all 1,500 seats. Eventually, the stadium is planned to have a capacity of 4,500 seats although there is no time scale laid out for this yet. UCD's record attendance at the venue was 2,236 on 13 September 2024 for the visit of Bohemian F.C. in an FAI Cup quarterfinal.

It was one of the venues for the 2017 Women's Rugby World Cup, as well as hosting games in the 2019 UEFA European Under-17 Championship.

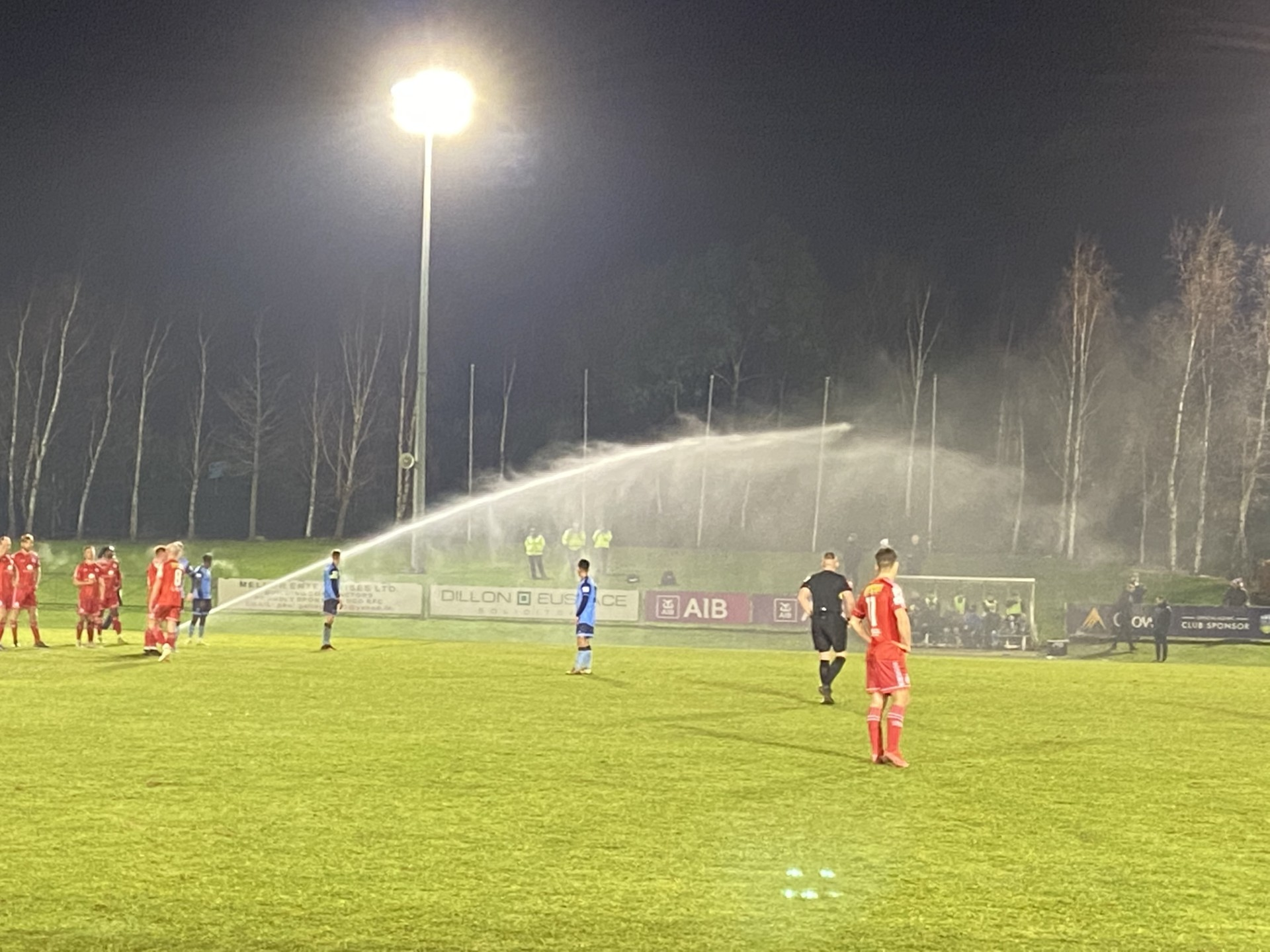
A sprinkler goes off during a League of Ireland Premier Division match between UCD and Shelbourne 28 February 2022
