= 2010 St Patrick's Athletic F.C. season =

St Patrick's Athletic F.C.
2010 season
- Chairman: (Republic of Ireland) Garrett Kelleher
- Manager: (Republic of Ireland) Pete Mahon
- Premier Division: 5th
- FAI Cup: Semi-final
- League of Ireland Cup: Quarter-final
- Setanta Cup: Runners up
- Leinster Senior Cup: First round
- Top goalscorer: League: Faherty (14); All: Faherty (19)
| Home colours | Away colours | Third colours |

The 2010 season is St Patrick's Athletic F.C.'s 81st year in existence, and their 59th year in the top division. The previous season the Saints finished 7th, failing to qualify for any European Competition.

== Pre-season ==
When the 2009 season finished, St Pats underwent a revamp. Most of the squad from the 2009 season was let go, only 5 players from 2009 were kept for 2010.

On 9 December Pete Mahon was appointed manager after successfully leading the Saints out of relegation trouble last season. Pete Mahon signed 13 players during pre-season, creating a good deal of excitement amongst the fans.

The team spent a weekend in Wexford where they defeated Wexford Youths 3–0. Up next were 2 home friendlies against Longford Town F.C., 3–1 and Limerick F.C., 1–1. These were followed by 2 away matches against Waterford United F.C., 0–0 and Bray Wanderers F.C., 1–3.

== Team kit ==
On 15 January it was announced that St Pats secured a kit deal with Umbro to add 4 years onto the deal already in place. Nissan were announced as the new main sponsors of the club after the deal with Paddy Power ran out. A new home and away jersey were issued for the 2010 season.

== First-team squad ==
| No. | Name | Nationality | Position | Date of birth (age) | Signed from | Notes |
Goalkeepers
| 1 | Gary Rogers | (Republic of Ireland) | GK | 25 September 1981 (age 44) | Galway United | |
| 20 | Dan Connor | (Republic of Ireland) | GK | 31 January 1981 (age 45) | Cork City | (left in July) |
| 20 | Chris Bennion | (Scotland) | GK | 30 August 1980 (age 45) | Athlone Town | (signed in July) |
| 30 | Paul Hunt | (England) | GK | 6 April 1990 (age 36) | Youth system | |
Defenders
| 2 | Derek Pender | (Republic of Ireland) | RB | 2 October 1984 (age 41) | Bray Wanderers | |
| 3 | Ian Bermingham | (Republic of Ireland) | LB | 8 January 1989 (age 37) | Shamrock Rovers | |
| 4 | Conor Kenna | (Republic of Ireland) | CB | 21 November 1984 (age 41) | Drogheda United | |
| 5 | Shane Guthrie | (Republic of Ireland) | CB | 11 December 1984 (age 41) | Galway United | |
| 6 | Damian Lynch | (Republic of Ireland) | RB | 31 July 1979 (age 47) | Drogheda United | Captain |
| 16 | Neil Harney | (Republic of Ireland) | RB | 20 February 1991 (age 35) | Youth system | |
| 19 | Noel Haverty | (Republic of Ireland) | CB | 24 February 1989 (age 37) | Youth system | |
Midfielders
| 7 | David McAllister | (Republic of Ireland) | CM | 29 December 1988 (age 37) | Shelbourne | |
| 8 | Stuart Byrne | (Republic of Ireland) | CM | 4 November 1976 (age 49) | Drogheda United | Vice captain |
| 12 | James O'Brien | (Republic of Ireland) | CM | 8 June 1990 (age 36) | Bradford City | (signed in July) |
| 14 | Brian Cash | (Republic of Ireland) | RW | 24 November 1982 (age 43) | Sligo Rovers | |
| 15 | Gareth Coughlan | (Republic of Ireland) | LW | 2 May 1990 (age 36) | Bray Wanderers | |
| 17 | Dave Mulcahy | (Republic of Ireland) | CM | 28 January 1978 (age 48) | Bray Wanderers | |
| 18 | Conor Sinnott | (Republic of Ireland) | CM | 19 January 1986 (age 40) | Wexford Youths | (left in July) |
| 21 | Ryan Guy | (United States) | RW | 5 September 1985 (age 40) | University of San Diego | |
| 25 | Derek Doyle | (Republic of Ireland) | LW | 30 April 1986 (age 40) | Shelbourne | |
Strikers
| 9 | Alex Williams | (Scotland) | ST | 15 January 1983 (age 43) | Dundalk | (left in July) |
| 9 | Danny North (signed in July) | (England) | ST | 7 September 1987 (age 38) | Alfreton Town | (signed in July) |
| 10 | Vinny Faherty | (Republic of Ireland) | ST | 13 June 1987 (age 39) | Galway United | |
| 11 | Paul Byrne | (Republic of Ireland) | ST | 19 May 1986 (age 40) | Bray Wanderers | |
| | Andy Haran | (Republic of Ireland) | ST | 5 January 1991 (age 35) | Youth system | On loan at Shelbourne |

== Premier Division ==
=== Matches ===
Win Draw Loss

| 5 March 2010 | St Patrick's Athletic | 2–0 | Galway United | Inchicore, Dublin |
| | Ryan Guy 8'; Shane Guthrie (yellow card) 11'; Ian Bermingham (yellow card) 19'; Alex Williams 68'; Vinny Faherty (yellow card) 74' | | Stephen O'Donnell (yellow card) 12'; Stephen O'Donnell (yellow card) 17' (red card); Rhys Meynell (yellow card) 58' | Stadium: Richmond Park; Attendance: 1,575; Referee: Padraig Sutton |

| 16 March 2010 | Shamrock Rovers | 0–2 | St Patrick's Athletic | Tallaght, Dublin |
| | James Chambers (yellow card) 79'; Danny Murphy (yellow card) 82' | | Alex Williams (yellow card) 17'; Shane Guthrie (yellow card) 25'; Ian Bermingham 57'; Vinny Faherty 58'; Vinny Faherty (yellow card) 58' | Stadium: Tallaght Stadium; Attendance: 5,500; Referee: Declan Hanney |

| 19 March 2010 | St Patrick's Athletic | 3–0 | UCD | Inchicore, Dublin |
| | Vinny Faherty 45'; Ryan Guy 87'; Ryan Guy 89' | | Ciarán Kilduff (yellow card) 90' | Stadium: Richmond Park; Attendance: 1,563; Referee: Alan Kelly |

| 26 March 2010 | Dundalk | 0–0 | St Patrick's Athletic | Dundalk, County Louth |
| | Tom Miller (yellow card) 24'; Wayne Hatswell (yellow card) 59'; Stephen Maher (yellow card) 65' | | Dave Mulcahy (yellow card) 24'; Alex Williams (yellow card) 38'; Dave McAllister (yellow card) 80' | Stadium: Oriel Park; Attendance: 2,800; Referee: Anthony Buttimer |

| 2 April 2010 | St Patrick's Athletic | 0–0 | Sporting Fingal | Inchicore, Dublin |
| | Dave McAllister (yellow card) 14'; Ryan Guy (yellow card) 35' | | Kenny Browne (yellow card) 43'; John Frost (yellow card) 85' | Stadium: Richmond Park; Attendance: 1,700; Referee: Anthony Buttimer |

| 6 April 2010 | Bohemians | 1–1 | St Patrick's Athletic | Phibsborough, Dublin |
| | Jason Byrne 47' | | Vinny Faherty 15'; Shane Guthrie (yellow card) 25'; Brian Cash (yellow card) 70' | Stadium: Dalymount Park; Attendance: 2,600; Referee: Dave McKeon |

| 9 April 2010 | St Patrick's Athletic | 0–1 | Drogheda United | Inchicore, Dublin |
| | | | Alan McNally (yellow card) 79'; Eoghan Osborne 90+3' | Stadium: Richmond Park; Referee: Richie Winter |

| 20 April 2010 | Bray Wanderers | 0–4 | St Patrick's Athletic | Bray, County Wicklow |
| | | | Paul Byrne 27'; Conor Kenna 33'; Shane Guthrie 37'; Gareth Coughlan 40' | Stadium: Carlisle Grounds; Attendance: 900; Referee: Dave McKeon |

| 23 April 2010 | St Patrick's Athletic | 1–0 | Sligo Rovers | Inchicore, Dublin |
| | Dave McAllister 57' | | Gavin Peers (yellow card) 84'; Alan Keane (yellow card) 90+4' | Stadium: Richmond Park; Referee: Alan Kelly |

| 26 April 2010 | Galway United | 0–2 | St Patrick's Athletic | Galway |
| | Paul Sinnott (yellow card) 57'; Barry Ryan (red card) 74' | | Paul Byrne 5'; Stuart Byrne 19'; David McAllister | Stadium: Terryland Park; Attendance: 805; Referee: Neil Doyle |

| 30 April 2010 | St Patrick's Athletic | 1–2 | Shamrock Rovers | Inchicore, Dublin |
| | Vinny Faherty (yellow card) 24'; Damian Lynch (yellow card) 33'; Derek Pender (yellow card) 61'; Alex Williams 90' | | Thomas Stewart 35'; Thomas Stewart 56' | Stadium: Richmond Park; Attendance: 3,400 |

| 3 May 2010 | UCD | 1–0 | St Patrick's Athletic | Belfield, Dublin |
| | David McMillan 33'; Greg Bolger (yellow card) 66'; Andy Boyle (yellow card) 84'; Brian Shortall (yellow card) 90+4' | | Conor Sinnott (yellow card) 7'; Derek Pender (yellow card) 27' | Stadium: UCD Bowl; Attendance: 643; Referee: Padraig Sutton |

| 7 May 2010 | St Patrick's Athletic | 1–0 | Dundalk | Inchicore, Dublin |
| | Paul Byrne 4'; Dave McAllister (red card) 36'; Dave Mulcahy (yellow card) 52' | | | Stadium: Richmond Park; Referee: Declan Hanney |

| 21 May 2010 | St Patrick's Athletic | 3–1 | Bohemians | Inchicore, Dublin |
| | Derek Doyle 39'; Paul Byrne 40'; Stuart Byrne 42' | | Jason Byrne 13'; Mark Quigley (yellow card) 16' | Stadium: Richmond Park; Referee: Anthony Buttimer |

| 29 May 2010 | Drogheda United | 2–1 | St Patrick's Athletic | Drogheda, County Louth |
| | Paul Crowley 30'; Eric McGill (yellow card) 44'; John Flood 86'; Joe Kendrick (yellow card) 87' | | Vinny Faherty 45'; Damian Lynch (yellow card) 90+1' | Stadium: Hunky Dorys Park; Attendance: 1,500 (Est.); Referee: Alan Kelly |

| 8 June 2010 | St Patrick's Athletic | 3–0 | Bray Wanderers | Inchicore, Dublin |
| | Vinny Faherty 2'; Vinny Faherty 14'; Conor Sinnott 90+2' | | Dane Massey (yellow card) 49' | Stadium: Richmond Park |

| 26 June 2010 | Sligo Rovers | 0–0 | St Patrick's Athletic | Sligo |
| | Gavin Peers (yellow card) 25'; Danny Ventre (yellow card) 87' | | Vinny Faherty (yellow card) 75' | Stadium: The Showground; Referee: Padraig Sutton |

| 2 July 2010 | St Patrick's Athletic | 4–2 | Galway United | Inchicore, Dublin |
| | Derek Doyle 2'; Vinny Faherty 59'; Derek Doyle 72'; Ryan Guy (yellow card) 74'; Derek Doyle 82' (pen.) | | Anthony Flood 38'; Gary Curran 45'; Anthony Flood (yellow card) 60' | Stadium: Richmond Park; Referee: Damien Hancock |

| 5 July 2010 | Shamrock Rovers | 2–1 | St Patrick's Athletic | Tallaght, Dublin |
| | Dan Murray (yellow card) 34'; Thomas Stewart 64'; Thomas Stewart 81'; Billy Dennehy (red card) 90' | | Derek Doyle 50'; Shane Guthrie (yellow card) 75'; Damian Lynch (yellow card) 79'; Ryan Guy (penalty missed) 90'; Brian Cash (yellow card) 90+3' | Stadium: Tallaght Stadium; Attendance: 4,803; Referee: Alan Kelly |

| 9 July 2010 | St Patrick's Athletic | 2–1 | UCD | Inchicore, Dublin |
| | Shane Guthrie 17'; Derek Doyle (yellow card) 21'; Stuart Byrne (yellow card) 44'; Shane Guthrie 81' | | Brian Shortall (yellow card) 11' | Stadium: Richmond Park; Referee: Neil Doyle |

| 18 July 2010 | Dundalk | 0–3 | St Patrick's Athletic | Dundalk, County Louth |
| | Stephen Maher (yellow card) 34'; Tom Miller (yellow card) 53'; Stuart Byrne (yellow card) 44'; Shane Guthrie 81' | | Dave Mulcahy 6'; Dave Mulcahy 18'; Ryan Guy (yellow card) 45'; Conor Kenna 51'; Paul Byrne (yellow card) 65' | Stadium: Oriel Park; Referee: Tom Connolly |

| 25 July 2010 | St Patrick's Athletic | 1–1 | Sporting Fingal | Inchicore, Dublin |
| | Damian Lynch (yellow card) 65'; Dave Mulcahy 88' | | Conan Byrne 66'; Shane McFaul (yellow card) 90+3' | Stadium: Richmond Park; Attendance: 1,500; Referee: Anthony Buttimer |

| 30 July 2010 | Bohemians | 1–1 | St Patrick's Athletic | Phibsborough, Dublin |
| | Owen Heary 4'; Paddy Madden (yellow card) 31'; Killian Brennan (yellow card) 70' | | Dave Mulcahy (yellow card) 44'; Dave Mulcahy 90+3' | Stadium: Dalymount Park; Attendance: 2,800; Referee: Alan Kelly |

| 6 August 2010 | St Patrick's Athletic | 2–0 | Drogheda United | Inchicore, Dublin |
| | Dave McAllister 23'; Danny North (yellow card) 27'; Derek Doyle 30'; Derek Pender (yellow card) 36'; Derek Doyle (yellow card) 45'; James O'Brien (yellow card) 67' | | Michael Daly (yellow card) 61'; John Flood (yellow card) 80' | Stadium: Richmond Park; Attendance: 1,269; Referee: Derek Tomney |

| 13 August 2010 | Bray Wanderers | 3–2 | St Patrick's Athletic | Bray, County Wicklow |
| | Shane O'Neill 6'; Jake Kelly 47'; Jake Kelly 54'; Matt Gregg (yellow card) 73' | | Danny North 8'; Derek Doyle (yellow card) 56'; Danny North (yellow card) 69'; Danny North 90+4' | Stadium: Carlisle Grounds; Referee: Neil Doyle |

| 20 August 2010 | St Patrick's Athletic | 0–0 | Sligo Rovers | Inchicore, Dublin |
| | Stuart Byrne (yellow card) 38'; Dave McAllister (yellow card) 60' | | Iarflaith Davoren (yellow card) 33' | Stadium: Richmond Park; Attendance: 2,200; Referee: Alan Kelly |

| 23 August 2010 | Sporting Fingal | 2–3 | St Patrick's Athletic | Santry, Dublin |
| | Shaun Williams 38'; Conan Byrne 76' | | Vinny Faherty 59'; Dave McAllister (yellow card) 63'; Derek Doyle 89' | Stadium: Morton Stadium; Attendance: 792; Referee: Padraigh Sutton |

| 3 September 2010 | Galway United | 1–1 | St Patrick's Athletic | Galway |
| | Stephen O'Donnell (yellow card) 42'; Karl Sheppard (yellow card) 45+1'>br />Phillip Reilly 68'; Seamus Conneely (yellow card) 75'; Paul Sinnott (yellow card) 85'; Phillip Reilly (yellow card) 90+2' | | Ryan Guy 12'; Dave McAllister (yellow card) 34'; Garreth O'Connor (yellow card) 57'; Derek Pender (yellow card) 76' | Stadium: Terryland Park; Referee: Anthony Buttimer |

| 10 September 2010 | St Patrick's Athletic | 1–3 | Shamrock Rovers | Inchicore, Dublin |
| | Ryan Guy 2'; Dave Mulcahy (yellow card) 26'; Stuart Byrne (yellow card) 79' | | Stephen Bradley (yellow card) 21'; Stephen Rice (yellow card) 25'; Gary Twigg 45'; Thomas Stewart 57'; Billy Dennehy 63' | Stadium: Richmond Park; Attendance: 4,000; Referee: Alan Kelly |

| 13 September 2010 | UCD | 3–2 | St Patrick's Athletic | Belfield, Dublin |
| | David McMillan 46'; Ciarán Kilduff 64'; Greg Bolger 68' (pen.); Gareth Matthews (yellow card) 90+1' | | Danny North 20'; Danny North (yellow card) 75'; Damian Lynch (yellow card) 84'; Sean Stewart 90+2' | Stadium: UCD Bowl; Referee: Richie Winter |

| 24 September 2010 | St Patrick's Athletic | 1–2 | Dundalk | Inchicore, Dublin |
| | Ian Bermingham (red card) 29'; Danny North (penalty missed) 64'; Damian Lynch 64' | | Ross Gaynor (yellow card) 24'; Matthew Tipton 26'; Ross Gaynor 52'; Liam Burns (yellow card) 63'; Wayne Hatswell (yellow card) 83'; Dean Barrett (yellow card) 85' | Stadium: Richmond Park; Referee: Alan Kelly |

| 2 October 2010 | Sporting Fingal | 2–2 | St Patrick's Athletic | Santry, Dublin |
| | Glen Crowe 76'; Ronan Finn 84' | | Dave Mulcahy 8'; Danny North 54' | Stadium: Morton Stadium; Attendance: 712; Referee: Declan Hanney |

| 5 October 2010 | Drogheda United | 0–3 | St Patrick's Athletic | Drogheda, County Louth |
| | Paul Crowley (yellow card) 45+1'; Eric McGill (red card) 62'; Robert Duggan (yellow card) 63' | | Ryan Guy 13'; Danny North (yellow card) 18'; Danny North 59'; Garreth O'Connor 84' | Stadium: Hunky Dorys Park; Attendance: 350; Referee: Tom Connolly |

| 9 October 2010 | St Patrick's Athletic | 0–1 | Bohemians | Inchicore, Dublin |
| | Dave Mulcahy (yellow card) 25'; Dave McAllister (yellow card) 32'; Danny North (yellow card) 90+1' | | Killian Brennan (penalty missed) 25'; Raffaele Cretaro 26' | Stadium: Richmond Park; Referee: Richie Winter |

| 22 October 2010 | St Patrick's Athletic | 2–0 | Bray Wanderers | Inchicore, Dublin |
| | Danny North 36'; Danny North 33' | | | Stadium: Richmond Park; Attendance: 800; Referee: Dave McKeon |

| 29 October 2010 | Sligo Rovers | 0–1 | St Patrick's Athletic | Inchicore, Dublin |
| | Alan Keane 90+2' (pen.) | | Dave McAllister (yellow card) 68' | Stadium: Richmond Park; Attendance: 2,800; Referee: Dave McKeon |

=== Final Table ===
| Pos | Team | Pld | W | D | L | GF | GA | GD | Pts | Qualification or relegation |
|---|---|---|---|---|---|---|---|---|---|---|
| 3 | Sligo Rovers | 36 | 17 | 12 | 7 | 61 | 36 | +25 | 63 | Qualification for Europa League third qualifying round (Note: Sligo Rovers qualified for the UEFA Europa League third qualifying round after winning the 2010 FAI Cup Final.) |
| 4 | Sporting Fingal (R) | 36 | 16 | 14 | 6 | 60 | 38 | +22 | 62 | Withdrew from league (Note: Sporting Fingal withdrew from League of Ireland due to financial difficulties shortly before the 2011 Premier Division season.) |
| 5 | St Patrick's Athletic | 36 | 16 | 9 | 11 | 55 | 33 | +22 | 57 | Qualification for Europa League first qualifying round |
| 6 | Dundalk | 36 | 14 | 6 | 16 | 46 | 50 | −4 | 48 | |
| 7 | UCD | 36 | 11 | 8 | 17 | 47 | 54 | −7 | 41 | |

Rules for classification: 1) points; 2) goal difference; 3) number of goals scored.
(R) Relegated

== Cups ==
=== FAI Cup ===
Third round

| 4 June 2010 | Dundalk | 0–1 | St Patrick's Athletic | Dundalk, Louth |
| | JJ Meligan (yellow card) 10'; Ciarán McGuigan (red card) 43'; JJ Melligan (red card) 45'; Garry Breen (red card) 90+2'; Ross Gaynor (yellow card) 90+3' | | Ryan Guy (yellow card) 18'; Damian Lynch (yellow card) 26'; Shane Guthrie (yellow card) 62'; Brian Cash 90' | Stadium: Oriel Park; Attendance: 2,300; Referee: Anthony Buttimer |

Fourth round

| 27 August 2010 | St Patrick's Athletic | 0–1 | Belgrove | Dundalk, Louth |
| | Derek Doyle (penalty missed) 2'; Derek Doyle 26'; Ian Bermingham 45' | | | Stadium: Oriel Park; Attendance: 1,044; Referee: Declan Hanney |

Quarter-final

| 18 September 2010 | St Patrick's Athletic | 3–1 | Sporting Fingal | Inchicore, Dublin |
| | Ryan Guy 22'; Damian Lynch (yellow card) 30'; James O'Brien (yellow card) 47'; Dave Mulcahy (yellow card) 51'; Damian Lynch 51'; Vinny Faherty 86' | | Shaun Williams 52'; Shaun Williams (yellow card) 90+3' | Stadium: Richmond Park; Referee: Richie Winter |

Semi-final

| 17 October 2010 | Shamrock Rovers | 2–2 | St Patrick's Athletic | Tallaght, Dublin |
| | Chris Turner 18'; Aidan Price (yellow card) 28'; Gary Twigg 65'; Billy Dennehy (yellow card) 73' | | Ian Bermingham (yellow card) 10'; Dave McAllister 31'; Derek Pender (yellow card) 45+2'; Paddy Kavanagh 90' (o.g.); Dave McAllister (yellow card) 90+1'; Stuart Byrne (yellow card) 90+4' | Stadium: Tallaght Stadium; Attendance: 5,165; Referee: Tom Connolly |

Semi-final replay

| 19 October 2010 | St Patrick's Athletic | 0–1 | Shamrock Rovers | Inchicore, Dublin |
| | Damian Lynch (red card) 53'; Dave McAllister (yellow card) 68' | | Pat Flynn (yellow card) 40'; Craig Sives (yellow card) 62'; Dessie Baker (yellow card) 68'; Chris Turner 70'; Thomas Stewart (yellow card) 74' | Stadium: Richmond Park; Attendance: 4,500; Referee: Tom Connolly |

=== League of Ireland Cup ===
Second round

| 10 May 2010 | St Patrick's Athletic | 2–0 | Bray Wanderers | Inchicore, Dublin |
| | Vinny Faherty 17'; Alex Williams 68' | | Shane O'Connor (yellow card) 10'; Richie Baker (yellow card) 41'; Chris Shields (yellow card) 48'; Robbie Doyle (yellow card) 82' | Stadium: Richmond Park; Attendance: 500; Referee: Tom Connolly |

Quarter Final

| 1 June 2010 | Sligo Rovers | 4–1 | St Patrick's Athletic | Sligo Town, Sligo |
| | John Russell 22'; Joseph N'Do 31'; Alan Keane (yellow card) 80'; Eoin Doyle 85'; Padraig Amond 90' | | Damien Lynch (yellow card) 31'; Alex Williams (yellow card) 66'; Conor Sinnott 70' | Stadium: The Showgrounds; Attendance: 1,300; Referee: Neil Doyle |

=== Setanta Cup ===
Group Stage

| 26 February 2010 | St Patrick's Athletic | 1–1 | Linfield | Dublin, Republic of Ireland |
| | Alex Williams 15' | | Jim Ervin 36' (pen.) | Stadium: Richmond Park; Referee: Tom Connolly |

| 13 March 2010 | Linfield | 1–0 | St Patrick's Athletic | Belfast, Northern Ireland |
| | Peter Thompson 90' | | | Stadium: Windsor Park |

Semi-final First Leg

| 13 April 2010 | St Patrick's Athletic | 4–1 | Sligo Rovers | Dublin, Republic of Ireland |
| | Paul Byrne 9'; David McAllister 37'; Shane Guthrie (yellow card) 41'; Gareth Coughlan 50'; Ryan Guy 84' | | Mark Donninger 45' | Stadium: Richmond Park; Referee: (Republic of Ireland) Declan Hanney |

Semi-final Second Leg

| 17 April 2010 | Sligo Rovers | 1–2 | St Patrick's Athletic | Sligo, Republic of Ireland |
| | Conor O'Grady 10' | | Paul Byrne 23'; Damian Lynch 60' | Stadium: The Showgrounds |

Final

| 15 May 2010 | St Patrick's Athletic | 0–1 | Bohemians | Dublin, Republic of Ireland |
| | | | Anthony Murphy 24' | Stadium: Tallaght Stadium; Attendance: 3,896; Referee: (Northern Ireland) Alan Black |

=== Leinster Senior Cup ===
First round

| 22 March 2010 | St Patrick's Athletic | 0–1 | Drogheda United | Inchicore, Dublin |
| | | | Paul Crowley 15'; Garreth O'Connor (yellow card) | Stadium: Richmond Park; Attendance: 200; Referee: Rob Rogers |
