= List of 2009–10 League of Ireland transfers =

This is a list of transfers involving clubs that played in the 2010 League of Ireland Premier Division and 2010 League of Ireland First Division.

The pre-season transfer window opened on 1 December 2009, and closed on 22 February 2010 for domestic transfers, and on 2 March 2010 for foreign transfers. Players without a club may join one at any time, either during or in between transfer windows.

== Pre-Season Transfers ==
=== Premier Division ===
==== Bohemians ====
In:

- (Australia) Chris O'Connor from Bray Wanderers (Free transfer)
- (Republic of Ireland) Stephen Gray from Derry City F.C. (Free transfer)
- (Northern Ireland) Ruaidhri Higgins from Derry City F.C. (Free transfer)
- (Republic of Ireland) Gareth McGlynn from Derry City F.C. (Free transfer)
- (Republic of Ireland) Raffaele Cretaro from Sligo Rovers (Free transfer)
- (Republic of Ireland) Barry Murphy from Shamrock Rovers (Free transfer)
- (Republic of Ireland) Mark Quigley from St Patrick's Athletic F.C. (Free transfer)

Out:

- (Republic of Ireland) Glen Crowe to Sporting Fingal F.C. (Free transfer)
- (Republic of Ireland) Neale Fenn to Dundalk F.C. (Free transfer)
- (England) Matt Gregg to Dundalk F.C. (Free transfer)
- (Republic of Ireland) Brian Murphy to Ipswich Town (Free transfer)
- (Republic of Ireland) Gary Deegan to Coventry City (£100,000)
- (Republic of Ireland) Mark Nolan to Athlone Town F.C. (Free transfer)
- (Republic of Ireland) Sean Byrne to Shelbourne F.C. (Free transfer)
- (Republic of Ireland) Mark Hughes to Shelbourne F.C. (Loan)

==== Cork City ====
In:

Out:

==== Drogheda Utd ====
In:

- (Republic of Ireland) Michael Daly from Dundalk F.C. (Free transfer)

Out:

- (Republic of Ireland) James Chambers to Shamrock Rovers F.C. (Free transfer)
- (Republic of Ireland) Paul Shiels to Shelbourne F.C. (Free transfer)
- (Republic of Ireland) Robbie Clarke to Shelbourne F.C. (Free transfer)
- (Wales) Steve Williams to Shelbourne F.C. (Free transfer)
- (Republic of Ireland) Shane Barrett to Sporting Fingal F.C. (Free transfer)

==== Dundalk ====
In:

- (Republic of Ireland) Alan Cawley from St. Patrick's Athletic (Free transfer)
- (England) Wayne Hatswell from Cambridge United (Free transfer)
- (England) Matt Gregg from Bohemians (Free transfer)
- (Republic of Ireland) Neale Fenn from Bohemians (Free transfer)
- (Republic of Ireland) Garry Breen from Galway United (Free transfer)
- (Republic of Ireland) Ross Gaynor from Sporting Fingal (Free transfer)
- (Republic of Ireland) Stephen Maher from St. Patrick's Athletic (Free transfer)

Out:

- (Northern Ireland) Michael Collins to Crusaders (Free transfer)
- (Northern Ireland) Paul McAreavey to Donegal Celtic (Free transfer)
- (Northern Ireland) Chris Turner to Shamrock Rovers (Free transfer)
- (Scotland) Chris Bennion to Athlone Town (Free transfer)
- (Republic of Ireland) Declan O'Brien to Valletta (Free transfer)
- (England) Darren Mansaram to Gainsborough Trinity (Free transfer)
- (Republic of Ireland) Michael Daly to Drogheda United (Free transfer)
- (Republic of Ireland) Shane Grimes to Monaghan United (Free transfer)
- (Scotland) Alex Williams to St. Patrick's Athletic (Free transfer)
- (Scotland) Kevin McKinlay to Greenock Morton (Free transfer)

==== Galway Utd ====
In:

- (Scotland) James Creaney from Dundalk (Free transfer)
- (Republic of Ireland) Thomas Heary from Dundalk (Free transfer)
- (Scotland) Jamie McKenzie from Aris Limassol (Free transfer)
- (Republic of Ireland) Bobby Ryan from St Patrick's Athletic (Free transfer)
- (Republic of Ireland) Stephen O'Donnell from Cork City (Free transfer)
- (Republic of Ireland) Karl Sheppard from Everton (Free transfer)
- (England) Rhys Meynell from Chester City (Free transfer)
- (Republic of Ireland) Gary Curran from Longford Town (Free transfer)
- (Republic of Ireland) Tom King from Longford Town (Free transfer)
- (Republic of Ireland) Anto Flood from Shelbourne (Free transfer)
- (Republic of Ireland) Ciaran Foley from Free agent
- (Republic of Ireland) Jonathan Keane from Free agent

Out:

- (Republic of Ireland) Seán Kelly to Limerick (Free transfer)
- (Republic of Ireland) Shane Guthrie to St Patrick's Athletic (Free transfer)
- (Republic of Ireland) Vinny Faherty to St Patrick's Athletic (Free transfer)
- (Republic of Ireland) Iarfhlaith Davoren to Sligo Rovers (Free transfer)
- (Republic of Ireland) John Russell to Sligo Rovers (Free transfer)
- (Republic of Ireland) Aaron Greene to Bohemians (Free transfer)
- (Republic of Ireland) Garry Breen to Dundalk (Free transfer)
- (Republic of Ireland) Ger Hanley to Mervue United (Free transfer)
- (Republic of Ireland) Shane Fitzgerald to UCD (Free transfer)
- (Republic of Ireland) Mark O'Toole to Out of contract
- (Republic of Ireland) David Cooke to Out of Contract
- (Angola) John Sangi to Out of Contract

==== St Pat's Ath ====
In:

- (Republic of Ireland) Derek Pender from Bray Wanderers (Free transfer)
- (Republic of Ireland) Dave McAllister from Shelbourne F.C. (Free transfer)
- (Republic of Ireland) Brian Cash from Sligo Rovers (Free transfer)
- (Republic of Ireland) Gareth Coughlan from Bray Wanderers (Free transfer)
- (Republic of Ireland) Conor Sinnott from Wexford Youths (Free transfer)
- (Republic of Ireland) Ian Bermingham from Shamrock Rovers (Free transfer)
- (Republic of Ireland) Paul Byrne from Bray Wanderers (Free transfer)
- (Republic of Ireland) Shane Guthrie from Galway United (Free transfer)
- (Scotland) Alex Williams from Dundalk F.C. (Free transfer)
- (Republic of Ireland) Vinny Faherty from Galway Utd (Free transfer)
- (Republic of Ireland) Dave Mulcahy from Bray Wanderers (Free transfer)
- (Republic of Ireland) Conor Kenna from Drogheda United (Free transfer)

Out:

- (Republic of Ireland) Brendan Clarke to Sporting Fingal (Free transfer)
- (Republic of Ireland) Alan Cawley to Dundalk F.C. (Free transfer)
- (Republic of Ireland) Enda Stevens to Shamrock Rovers (Free transfer)
- (Republic of Ireland) Gary Dempsey to Darlington F.C. (Free transfer)
- (Republic of Ireland) Anthony Costigan to Monaghan United (Free transfer)
- (England) Darragh Ryan to Stevenage Borough F.C. (Free transfer)
- (Republic of Ireland) John Lester to Longford Town (Free transfer)
- (Republic of Ireland) Mark Quigley to Bohemians F.C. (Free transfer)
- (Republic of Ireland) Andy Haran to Shelbourne F.C. (Loan)
- (Republic of Ireland) Jason Gavin to Free Agent (Released)
- (Republic of Ireland) Stephen Maher to Dundalk F.C. (Free transfer)

==== Shamrock Rovers ====
In:

- (Republic of Ireland) James Chambers from Drogheda United (Free transfer)
- (Republic of Ireland) Enda Stevens from St Patrick's Athletic (Free transfer)
- (Republic of Ireland) Billy Dennehy from Cork City F.C. (Free transfer)
- (Republic of Ireland) Chris Turner from Dundalk F.C. (Free transfer)
- (Republic of Ireland) Craig Walsh from Cherry Orchard F.C. (Free transfer)

Out:

- (Republic of Ireland) Shane Robinson to Free Agent (Released)
- (Republic of Ireland) Darragh Maguire to Free Agent (Released)
- (Republic of Ireland) Simon Madden to Darlington F.C. (Free transfer)
- (Republic of Ireland) Corey Tracey to Free Agent (Released)
- (Republic of Ireland) Padraig Amond to Sligo Rovers (Free transfer)
- (Republic of Ireland) Barry Murphy to Bohemians F.C. (Free transfer)
- (Republic of Ireland) Ian Bermingham to St Patrick's Athletic (Free transfer)
- (Republic of Ireland) Tadhg Purcell to Darlington F.C. (Free transfer)
- (Republic of Ireland) Kevin Quinn to Athlone Town F.C. (Free transfer)
- (Republic of Ireland) Stephen Conlon to Longford Town F.C. (Free transfer)
- (Republic of Ireland) Thomas Hyland to Longford Town F.C. (Free transfer)

==== Sligo Rovers ====
In:

- (Republic of Ireland) Padraig Amond from Shamrock Rovers (Free transfer)
- (Republic of Ireland) Gary McCabe from Bray Wanderers (Free transfer)
- (Republic of Ireland) Iarlaith Davoren from Galway United (Free transfer)

Out:

- (Republic of Ireland) Owen Morrison to Portadown F.C. (Free transfer)
- (Republic of Ireland) Martin Camano to Free Agent (Released)
- (Republic of Ireland) Joe Kendrick to Free Agent (Released)
- (Republic of Ireland) Ger Rafter to Free Agent (Released)
- (Republic of Ireland) Rob Turner to Rhyl F.C. (Free transfer)
- (Republic of Ireland) Raffaele Cretaro to Bohemians F.C. (Free transfer)
- (Republic of Ireland) Brian Cash to St Patrick's Athletic (Free transfer)
- (Republic of Ireland) Jason Noctor to Finn Harps (Free transfer)

==== Sporting Fingal ====
In:

- (Republic of Ireland) Brendan Clarke from St Patrick's Athletic (Free transfer)
- (Republic of Ireland) Ronan Finn from UCD F.C. (Free transfer)
- (Republic of Ireland) Ger O'Brien from Derry City F.C. (Free transfer)
- (Republic of Ireland) Kenny Browne from Waterford United (Free transfer)
- (Republic of Ireland) Glen Crowe from Bohemians F.C. (Free transfer)
- (Republic of Ireland) Darren Quigley from Derry City F.C. (Free transfer)
- (Republic of Ireland) Shane Barrett from Drogheda United (Free transfer)

Out:

- (Republic of Ireland) Gareth Whelan to Shelbourne F.C. (Free transfer)
- (Republic of Ireland) Dinny Corcoran to Shelbourne F.C. (Loan)
- (Republic of Ireland) Eric Foley to Shelbourne F.C. (Free transfer)
- (Republic of Ireland) Fiachra McArdle to Longford Town F.C. (Free transfer)

==== UCD ====
In:

Out:

- (Republic of Ireland) John Reilly to Free Agent (Released)
- (Republic of Ireland) Ronan Finn to Sporting Fingal (Released)
- (Republic of Ireland) Garvan Broughall to Athlone Town F.C. (Released)
- (Republic of Ireland) Timmy Purcell to Waterford United (Released)

=== First Division ===
==== Athlone Town ====
In:

Out:

==== Bray Wanderers ====
In:

Out:

- (Australia) Chris O'Connor to Bohemian F.C. (Free transfer)
- (Republic of Ireland) Derek Pender to St Pat's (Free transfer)
- (Republic of Ireland) Gareth Coughlan to St Pat's (Free transfer)
- (Republic of Ireland) Gary McCabe to Sligo Rovers (Free transfer)

==== Derry City ====
In:

- (Northern Ireland) Stephen Parkhouse from Sligo Rovers F.C.

Out:

- (Republic of Ireland) Stephen Gray to Bohemian F.C. (Free transfer)
- (Northern Ireland) Ruaidhri Higgins to Bohemian F.C. (Free transfer)
- (Republic of Ireland) Gareth McGlynn to Bohemian F.C. (Free transfer)

==== Finn Harps ====
In:

Out:

==== Limerick ====
In:

- (Republic of Ireland) Seán Kelly from Galway United F.C. (Free transfer)

Out:

==== Longford Town ====
In:

Out:

==== Mervue Utd ====
In:

(Republic of Ireland) Kevin McHugh from Linfield F.C.

Out:

==== Monaghan Utd ====
In:

Out:

==== Salthill Devon ====
In:

Out:

==== Shelbourne ====
In:

- (Republic of Ireland) Sean Byrne from Bohemian F.C. (Free transfer)
- (Republic of Ireland) Mark Hughes from Bohemian F.C. (Loan)
- (Republic of Ireland) Paul Shiels from Drogheda United F.C. (Free transfer)
- (Republic of Ireland) Robbie Clarke from Drogheda United F.C. (Free transfer)
- (Wales) Steve Williams to Drogheda United F.C. (Free transfer)

Out:

- (Republic of Ireland) Dave McAllister to St Patrick's Athletic F.C. (Free transfer)

==== Waterford Utd ====
In:

Out:

==== Wexford Youths ====
In:

Out:
