= 2011 Dundalk F.C. season =

Dundalk
2011 season
- Chairman: Padraig McGowan
- Manager: Ian Foster
- Stadium: Oriel Park
- Premier Division: 7th
- FAI Cup: Third round
- League Cup: Second round
- Leinster Senior Cup: First round
- Setanta Cup: Runners-up
Home colours	Away colours	Third colours

The 2011 season was Dundalk's third successive season in the League of Ireland Premier Division following promotion in 2008. Altogether, it was the club's 85th season in League of Ireland football. The club was managed by Ian Foster, who was in his second season in charge. The club finished the 36-match season in 7th position having been challenging at the top of the table for the first half of the season. The club also competed in the FAI Cup, League of Ireland Cup, Setanta Sports Cup, and the Leinster Senior Cup. In the Setanta Sports Cup they reached the final, but lost to Shamrock Rovers F.C.

After losing the final, and with the playing budget already being restricted by the club's owner, Gerry Matthews, results subsequently deteriorated as the season drew to a close. Financial losses were mounting, and Matthews decided to relinquish control of the club. Foster's contract expired at the end of the season and he was allowed to leave.

== 2011 Fixtures and results ==
=== Setanta Sports Cup 2011 ===
==== First Round ====
===== First leg =====
14 February 2011
19.45 GMT

Linfield	3–5	Dundalk
Peter Thompson 43' (pen.) (penalty missed) 62' (pen.); Robert Garrett 62'; Curtis Allen 81'	Report	Daniel Kearns 31' 66' 90+2'; Mark Quigley 54' 75'

Windsor Park, Belfast
Referee: Stephen Weatherall.

===== Second leg =====
28 February 2011
20.00 GMT

Dundalk	1–1	Linfield
Ross Gaynor 11'	Report	Michael Gault 45+3'

Oriel Park, Dundalk
Attendance: 2250
Referee: Damien Hancock

Dundalk won 6 − 4 on aggregate

==== Quarter-Finals ====
===== First leg =====
7 March 2011
19.45 GMT

Glentoran	0–1	Dundalk
	Report	Mark Quigley 82'

The Oval, Belfast
Referee: Arnold Hunter.

===== Second leg =====
22 March 2011
19.45 GMT

Dundalk	1–1	Glentoran
Ross Gaynor 81'	Report	Andrew Waterworth (penalty missed) 54 ' (pen.); Matty Burrows 62' (pen.); Jonathan Taylor (red card) 78'

Oriel Park, Dundalk
Referee: Richie Winter.

Dundalk won 2 − 1 on aggregate

==== First leg ====
4 April 2011
19.45 IST

Cliftonville	1–3	Dundalk
George McMullan 25'	Report	Mark Quigley 48' 82'; Daniel Kearns 73'

Solitude, Belfast
Attendance: 750 (Approx.).
Referee: Damien Hancock.

==== Second leg ====
18 April 2011
19.45 IST

Dundalk	2–1	Cliftonville
Jason Byrne 67'; Johnny Breen 90+3'	Report	Kieran O’Connor 59'

Oriel Park, Dundalk
Attendance: 2,000 (Est.).
Referee: Alan Black.

Dundalk won 5−2 on aggregate

==== Final ====
14 May 2011
18.15 IST

Dundalk	0–2	Shamrock Rovers
	Report	Gary O'Neill 65'; Billy Dennehy 90+3'

Tallaght Stadium, Dublin
Attendance: 4,789
Referee: Alan Kelly

=== Leinster Senior Cup ===
==== First Round ====
22 February 2011
19.45 GMT

Dundalk	0–2	Shamrock Rovers
	Report	Gary O'Neill 35'; Stephen O'Donnell 78'

Oriel Park, Dundalk
Referee: Robert Rogers.

=== League of Ireland Cup ===
==== Second Round ====
25 April 2011
15.00 IST

Monaghan United	2–1	Dundalk
Philip Byrne 80'; Declan O'Brien 99'	Report	Keith Ward 21'

Gortakeegan, Monaghan
Referee: Thomas Connolly.

=== FAI Cup ===
==== Third Round ====
5 June 2010
15.00 IST

Dundalk	4–1	Galway United
Dean Bennett 20'; Johnny Breen 45'; Mark Quigley 74' (pen.); Daniel Kearns 76'	Report	Alan Murphy 13'; Shaun Kelly (red card) 90+3'

Oriel Park, Dundalk
Attendance: 576.
Referee: Paul Tuite.

=== League table ===
Pos	Team	Pld	W	D	L	GF	GA	GD	Pts	Qualification or relegation
1	Shamrock Rovers (C)	36	23	8	5	69	24	+45	77	Qualification for Champions League second qualifying round
2	Sligo Rovers	36	22	7	7	73	19	+54	73	Qualification for Europa League second qualifying round (Note: Sligo Rovers qualified for the UEFA Europa League second qualifying round after winning the 2011 FAI Cup Final.)
3	Derry City	36	18	14	4	63	23	+40	68	Banned from 2012–13 European competitions (Note: Derry City were banned from European competitions for three seasons after going into liquidation.)
4	St Patrick's Athletic	36	17	12	7	62	35	+27	63	Qualification for Europa League first qualifying round
5	Bohemians	36	17	9	10	39	27	+12	60	Qualification for Europa League first qualifying round
6	Bray Wanderers	36	15	6	15	53	50	+3	51	
7	Dundalk	36	11	11	14	50	53	−3	44	
8	UCD	36	10	4	22	42	80	−38	34	
9	Drogheda United	36	7	4	25	32	77	−45	25	
10	Galway United (Note: Galway United were originally relegated but subsequently withdrew from the league.)	36	1	3	32	20	115	−95	6	Qualification for relegation play-off

Rules for classification: 1) points; 2) goal difference; 3) number of goals scored.
(C) Champions

== 2011 squad ==
Note: Flags indicate national team as defined under FIFA eligibility rules; some limited exceptions apply. Players may hold more than one non-FIFA nationality.

No.	Pos.	Nation	Player
1	GK	(Scotland) SCO	Peter Cherrie
2	DF	(Republic of Ireland) IRL	Simon Madden
3	DF	(Republic of Ireland) IRL	Eoghan Osborne
4	MF	(England) ENG	Dean Bennett
5	DF	(Republic of Ireland) IRL	Colin Hawkins
8	MF	(Republic of Ireland) IRL	Stephen Maher
9	FW	(Republic of Ireland) IRL	Mark Quigley
10	FW	(Republic of Ireland) IRL	Jason Byrne

No.	Pos.	Nation	Player
11	MF	(Republic of Ireland) IRL	Ross Gaynor
12	GK	(Republic of Ireland) IRL	Paul Murphy
13	DF	(Republic of Ireland) IRL	Nathan Murphy
14	MF	(Republic of Ireland) IRL	Greg Bolger
16	MF	(Republic of Ireland) IRL	Stephen McDonnell
17	MF	(Republic of Ireland) IRL	Keith Ward
18	FW	(Republic of Ireland) IRL	Mark Griffin
19	FW	(Republic of Ireland) IRL	Johnny Breen

=== 2011 pre-season transfers ===
In:

- (Republic of Ireland) Jason Byrne from Bohemians (Free transfer)
- (Republic of Ireland) Mark Quigley from Bohemians (Free transfer)
- (Republic of Ireland) Keith Ward from UCD (Free transfer)
- (Republic of Ireland) Eoghan Osborne from Drogheda United (Free transfer)
- (England) Michael Hector from Reading (On loan)
- (Republic of Ireland) Greg Bolger from Sporting Fingal (Free transfer)
- (Republic of Ireland) Colin Hawkins from Sporting Fingal (Free transfer)
- (Republic of Ireland) Shane Guthrie from St. Patrick's Athletic (On loan)

Out:

- (Republic of Ireland) Shaun Kelly (Released)
- (Wales) Matthew Tipton to Portadown (Free transfer)
- (Bosnia and Herzegovina) Fahrudin Kuduzović to SV Eintracht Trier 05 (Free transfer)
- (England) Wayne Hatswell to Newport County (Free transfer)
- (Republic of Ireland) Garry Breen to Portadown (Free transfer)
- (Republic of Ireland) Ciarán McGuigan to Syrianska (Free transfer)
- (England) Tom Miller to Newport County (Undisclosed)
- (Republic of Ireland) Alan Cawley to Portadown (Free transfer)
- (Scotland) Steven Lennon to Newport County (Free transfer)
- (Northern Ireland) Liam Burns to Bohemians (Free transfer)

=== 2011 mid-season transfers ===
In:

Out:

- (England) Michael Hector to Reading (Loan ended)
- (Republic of Ireland) Shane Guthrie to St. Patrick's Athletic (Loan ended)
