= 2010 League of Ireland First Division =

League of Ireland First Division
- Season: 2010
- Champions: Derry City
- Matches: 198
- Goals: 547 (2.76 per match)
- Top goalscorer: Graham Cummins: 18 (Cork City); Mark Farren: 18 (Derry City); Willie John Kiely: 18 (Waterford United)
- Biggest home win: Waterford United 8–0 Salthill Devon
- Biggest away win: Salthill Devon 0–7 Derry City
- Highest scoring: Shelbourne 6–3 Athlone Town
- Longest winning run: Derry City (8)
- Longest unbeaten run: Derry City (15)
- Longest losing run: Mervue United(6)
- Highest attendance: Cork City v Waterford United (4401)
- Lowest attendance: Mervue United v Monaghan United (50)
- Average attendance: 741

The 2010 League of Ireland First Division season was the 26th season of the League of Ireland First Division. The First Division was contested by 12 teams and Derry City won the title.

== Teams ==
Location of teams in the 2010 League of Ireland First Division

Team	Base	Stadium
Athlone Town	Athlone	Athlone Town Stadium
Cork City FORAS Co-op	Cork	Turner's Cross
Derry City	Derry	Brandywell Stadium
Finn Harps	Ballybofey	Finn Park
Limerick	Limerick	Jackman Park
Longford Town	Longford	Flancare Park
Mervue United	Galway	Terryland Park
Monaghan United	Monaghan	Kingspan Century Park
Salthill Devon	Salthill	Drom Soccer Park
Shelbourne	Drumcondra	Tolka Park
Waterford United	Waterford	Waterford RSC
Wexford Youths	Crossabeg	Ferrycarraig Park

== Overview ==
This season the division featured 12 clubs. The regular season began on 6 March and concluded on 30 October. Each team played the other teams three times, totaling 33 games. Derry City finished as champions and were automatically promoted to the Premier Division.

== Final table ==
Pos	Team	Pld	W	D	L	GF	GA	GD	Pts	Qualification or relegation
1	Derry City (C)	33	20	9	4	65	24	+41	69	Promoted to Premier Division
2	Waterford United	33	20	6	7	59	27	+32	66	Lost promotion/relegation play off
3	Monaghan United	33	18	8	7	59	29	+30	62	Lost promotion/relegation play off
4	Shelbourne	33	18	7	8	57	31	+26	61	
5	Limerick F.C.	33	17	6	10	55	35	+20	57	
6	Cork City FORAS Co-op (Note: After Cork City were liquidated following the 2009 Premier Division season, the supporters' trust, FORAS, re-entered the club in the First Division under a temporary name.)	33	15	7	11	39	31	+8	52	
7	Wexford Youths	33	12	6	15	42	54	−12	42	
8	Finn Harps	33	10	10	13	37	43	−6	40	
9	Longford Town	33	9	8	16	39	53	−14	35	
10	Athlone Town	33	6	13	14	35	50	−15	31	
11	Mervue United	33	5	4	24	34	84	−50	19	
12	Salthill Devon	33	3	6	24	26	86	−60	15	Won promotion/relegation play off

Rules for classification: 1) points; 2) goal difference; 3) number of goals scored.
(C) Champions

== Results ==
=== Matches 1–22 ===
Home \ Away	ATH	COR	DER	FHA	LIM	LON	MER	MON	SAL	SHE	WAT	WEX
Athlone Town		1–1	1–3	0–1	1–3	2–0	1–0	4–4	2–2	0–0	1–1	1–1
Cork City	0–1		1–1	2–1	1–2	1–0	4–2	0–1	1–0	0–1	0–2	1–0
Derry City	1–0	1–1		2–0	0–0	0–0	4–1	2–3	1–0	1–0	2–0	3–1
Finn Harps	0–0	0–0	1–1		0–3	2–0	2–3	0–0	2–0	1–1	1–1	2–1
Limerick	3–2	1–3	0–1	2–1		2–0	2–0	1–1	5–0	1–0	0–0	2–0
Longford Town	2–1	1–1	1–3	3–2	1–0		2–1	0–3	2–2	3–5	2–1	0–1
Mervue United	1–0	2–4	1–2	1–3	1–1	4–3		1–1	2–2	0–1	2–3	0–1
Monaghan United	0–0	1–0	0–1	0–1	2–1	2–2	4–0		3–0	0–2	1–0	4–2
Salthill Devon	0–1	1–3	0–7	0–1	2–3	0–3	2–0	1–6		0–2	0–1	0–0
Shelbourne	6–3	1–1	1–2	1–0	0–4	1–1	4–0	1–1	3–0		0–1	1–2
Waterford United	0–0	1–1	1–0	2–0	2–1	2–0	3–0	1–2	8–0	0–3		3–0
Wexford Youths	2–1	0–2	1–5	3–0	5–3	1–2	3–2	0–1	0–3 (Note: The match was awarded to Salthill Devon by 3–0 after Wexford Youths fielded an ineligible player.)	1–1	1–0	

Source: loi.ie
Legend: Blue = home team win; Yellow = draw; Red = away team win.

=== Matches 23–33 ===
Home \ Away	ATH	COR	DER	FHA	LIM	LON	MER	MON	SAL	SHE	WAT	WEX
Athlone Town		0–1			1–5	0–0	1–0			0–2		
Cork City						1–0	2–1	1–0	1–2		0–1	
Derry City	2–2	0–1		2–2			6–0			3–0		
Finn Harps	2–2	1–0			1–1		4–0		3–2			1–1
Limerick		1–3	0–1			3–1				0–1		1–0
Longford Town			1–1	1–0			2–2			1–2	0–2	1–2
Mervue United					0–1			2–1	2–1		1–6	2–5
Monaghan United	2–0		0–1	2–0	0–0	2–0					4–2	
Salthill Devon	1–1		1–5		1–3	1–4		0–3			1–1	
Shelbourne		2–0		3–1			3–0	2–1	5–0		1–2	
Waterford United	3–2		2–0	3–1	3–0							1–0
Wexford Youths	1–3	2–1	1–1					1–4	2–1	1–1		

Source: loi.ie
Legend: Blue = home team win; Yellow = draw; Red = away team win.

== Promotion/relegation play-offs ==
=== Premier Division ===
The second and third placed First Division teams, Waterford United and Monaghan United, played off to decide who would play the winner of the Premier Division play-off. The winner of this play off would play in the 2011 Premier Division.

First Division

2 November 2010	Waterford United	1 – 3	Monaghan United	Waterford RSC
19:45 GMT	Liam Kearney 65'	Report	Aidan Lynch 28'; Philip Hughes 58', 85'	Attendance: 1,462; Referee: Paul McLoughlin (Donegal)

First Division v Premier Division

5 November 2010	Monaghan United	0 – 0	Bray Wanderers	Kingspan Century Park
19.45 GMT		Report	Matt Gregg (red card) 89'	Referee: Damien Hancock (Dublin)

8 November 2010	Bray Wanderers	1 – 1 (a.e.t.) (7 – 6 p)	Monaghan United	Carlisle Grounds
19.45 GMT	Jake Kelly 120+2'	Report	Chris Shields 118' (o.g.)	Referee: Declan Hanney (Dublin)
	Penalties
	Gary Dempsey (penalty scored); Jake Kelly (penalty scored); Gary Shaw (penalty missed); Dane Massey (penalty scored); Danny O'Connor (penalty scored) Daire Doyle (penalty scored); Shane O'Neill (penalty scored); Chris Shields (penalty scored)		(penalty scored) Karl Bermingham; (penalty scored) Philip Hughes; (penalty scored) Brian Gartland; (penalty scored) Barry Clancy; (penalty missed) Alan Byrne (penalty scored) Dom Tierney; (penalty scored) Stephen McCrossan; (penalty missed) Paul Whelan

Bray Wanderers won 7 – 6 on penalties and retained their place in the Premier Division

=== First Division ===
The tenth placed First Division team, Salthill Devon, played the highest placed non-reserve team, Cobh Ramblers, from the 2010 A Championship. The winner of this play off would play in the 2011 First Division.

2 November 2010	Cobh Ramblers	0 – 1	Salthill Devon	St Colman's Park
19:45 GMT		Report	Mikey Gilmore 35'	Referee: Graham Kelly (Cork)

6 November 2010	Salthill Devon	2 – 1	Cobh Ramblers	Drom Soccer Park
19:45 GMT	Robbie Porter 8'; Ciprian Straut 90+3'	Report	Jamie Murphy 55'	Referee: John Grimes (Dublin)

Salthill Devon won 3 – 1 on aggregate and retained their place in the 2011 First Division

== Top goalscorers ==
Includes goals scored in regular season only.

Rank	Scorer	Team	Goals
1	(Republic of Ireland) Graham Cummins	Cork City	18
1	(Republic of Ireland) Mark Farren	Derry City	18
1	(Republic of Ireland) Willie John Kiely	Waterford United	18
4	(Republic of Ireland) Philip Hughes	Monaghan United	14
5	(Republic of Ireland) Patrick McEleney	Derry City	12
5	(Republic of Ireland) Kevin McHugh	Finn Harps	12

== See also ==
- 2010 League of Ireland Premier Division
- 2010 League of Ireland Cup
- 2010 A Championship
- List of 2009–10 League of Ireland transfers
- 2010 Shamrock Rovers F.C. season
- 2010 St Patrick's Athletic F.C. season
