= Shane McFaul =

Irish footballer

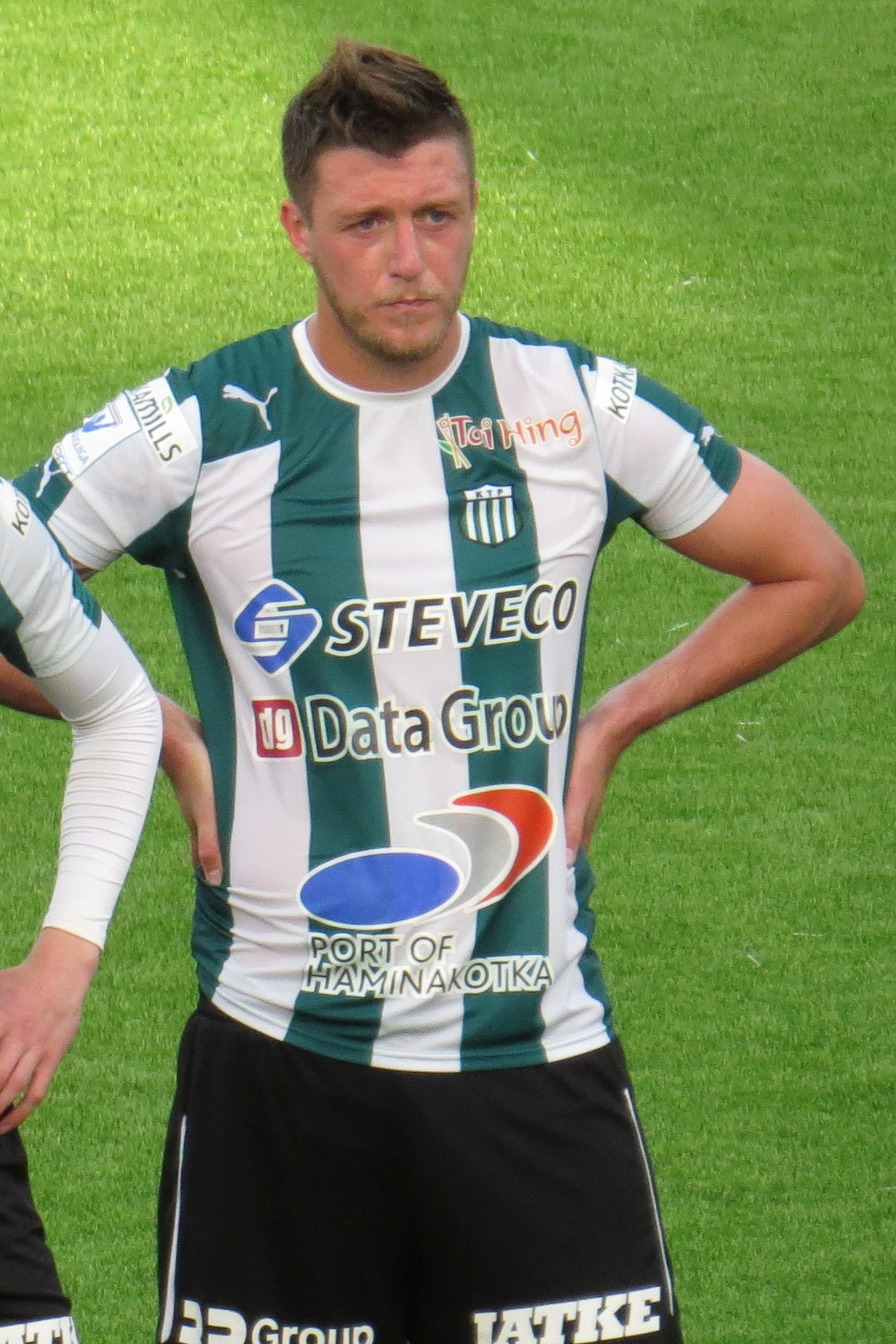
- McFaul in 2015

Personal information
- Date of birth: 23 May 1986 (age 40)
- Place of birth: Dublin, Ireland
- Position: Defensive midfielder

Youth career
- Cherry Orchard

Senior career*
Years	Team	Apps	(Gls)
2002–2005	Notts County	45	(0)
2006	Virginia Beach Mariners	15	(0)
2007	UCD	28	(1)
2008	Brighton & Hove Albion	1	(0)
2008	UCD	15	(0)
2009–2010	Sporting Fingal	68	(1)
2011	St Patrick's Athletic	33	(0)
2012	FC Haka	25	(0)
2013	St Patrick's Athletic	26	(1)
2014–2016	KTP	59	(1)
2017	DSK Shivajians	19	(2)
2018	Mikkelin Palloilijat	12	(0)
2019	Sudet	14	(1)
2022	Northern Colorado Hailstorm	6	(0)

International career
2004	Republic of Ireland U19	4	(0)
2007	Republic of Ireland U21	1	(0)
- * Club domestic league appearances and goals

Shane Charles Alan McFaul (born 23 May 1986) is an Irish former professional footballer. McFaul has played for over 11 clubs in 5 countries throughout Europe, Asia and North America, including UCD (over two spells), Sporting Fingal & St Patrick's Athletic (over two spells) in Ireland, Notts County & Brighton & Hove Albion in England, FC Haka, KTP, Mikkelin Palloilijat & Sudet in Finland, Virginia Beach Mariners and Northern Colorado Hailstorm in the United States of America, and also DSK Shivajians in India.

== Career ==
Born in Dublin, Shane started out his career with local side C.A.R.C FC before moving on to the notorious schoolboy club Cherry Orchard. He played there in a successful team with the likes of Gary Dicker, Paul Byrne and Derek Doyle.

In 2002 Shane signed a four-year professional contract with League One side Notts County. After only a short few months at Meadow Lane Shane was given the number 16 squad number as a then 16 year old. He made numerous appearances as an unused substitute during that season. It was the 2003–04 season where he really came to prominence. He made his debut at 17 as a second-half replacement against Swindon Town, filling in at right back. Although losing 4–1 McFaul made a huge impression with his passing ability, energy and drive, and he therefore earned a starting spot 2 days later against Peterborough United.

McFaul earned rave reviews after his performance and left the field to a standing ovation. His creativity on the ball and work rate caught the eye and he went on to make eight more appearances that season. 2004–05 saw McFaul make 37 first team appearances, filling in for 20 games at right back although performing well it was at his preferred central midfield role where he excelled. 2005–06 saw McFaul on the way out of Meadow Lane as new manager Guðjón Þórðarson restricted his chances in the first team.

A brief stint at Virginia Beach Mariners in 2006 followed, where he was recommended by former Tottenham Hotspur star Darren Caskey. Unfortunately, the Virginia Beach Mariners went defunct so McFaul's two-year deal was retracted.

The 2007 season saw McFaul linking up with former Cherry Orchard teammates at UCD in the Eircom Premier League. It was here he shone with fellow under 21 international Ronan Finn in the centre of the park. The highlights of the season was an outstanding performance live on television against Shamrock Rovers, earning not only the Man of the Match award but a call up to the Irish Under 21s squad. A low was missing out on a FAI Cup Semi-final against Longford Town due to ankle ligament damage.

In the close season McFaul had successful trials at Championship side Scunthorpe United and League One side Brighton which led to him agreeing to join Brighton on a free transfer until the end of the 2007/08 season on 11 January 2008.

Shane made his Brighton debut coming on as a late substitute during the 3–0 home victory over Crewe.

After six months and a lack of first team opportunities, McFaul was released on 6 May 2008.

Shane returned to Ireland and re-signed for UCD on 15 May 2008.

For the 2009 season McFaul signed with the newly founded but exciting project Sporting Fingal under the stewardship of former Irish International Liam Buckley.

Fingal achieved promotion to the Premier Division at the end of 2009 and better was to come as Fingal and McFaul won the FAI Cup when beating Sligo Rovers 2–1 at Tallaght Stadium. McFaul was later named Man of the Match in the F.A.I Cup Final Vs Sligo Rovers and also the honour of being named Sporting Fingal Player of the Year 2009.

In the 2010 season his performances for Fingal attracted the interest of Scottish giants Celtic.

Shane made his Republic of Ireland U21 debut in a friendly game against Germany on 21 August 2007. He was also an unused sub in the UEFA European Under-21 Championship Qualifying games against Portugal and England.

McFaul signed for the club he supported as a boy, St. Patrick's Athletic in February 2011 after Sporting Fingal went out of business. McFaul won the St. Patrick's Athletic Supporters Club Player of the Month for July 2011 after his brilliant performances.

In December 2011, McFaul signed for Finnish club FC Haka. McFaul had a good season personally, but unfortunately this was not the case for Haka as they were relegated.

McFaul returned to St Patrick's Athletic on 20 November 2012, linking up with his former Sporting Fingal manager Liam Buckley. He made his comeback to the Saints in a 0–0 draw with Glentoran live on Setanta Sports. On the opening day of the season at home to Drogheda United, McFaul came from the bench in the 58th minute and it took him seven minutes to end a goal drought that went back three years to win the game 1–0 for Pats. The season ended with St Patricks Athletic winning the Airtricty League title.

He returned to Finland signing for KTP for the 2014 season and had an excellent season as they gained promotion to the Veikkausliiga for the 2015 Season finishing runners up to HIFK on goal difference then via the financial demise of FC Honka.

Despite some impressive performances and being an ever-present in the starting line-up in the 2015 season, KTP suffered relegation to the Finnish First Division (Ykkönen) .

On 14 July 2016, his contract with KTP was terminated in mutual agreement. On 17 August 2016, I-League club DSK Shivajians have announced the signing of former Irish youth international Shane McFaul for a two-year term (2016–18).

In July 2018, McFaul has moved to Mikkelin Palloilijat in the Kakkonen.

In June 2019 McFaul signed for Sudet to play the remainder of the Finnish Kakkonen Division playing 14 times and scoring 1 goal.

In January 2022, McFaul signed for newly founded USL League One club Northern Colorado Hailstorm, where he would play under manager Éamon Zayed, a former teammate of his at Sporting Fingal in Ireland.

On 7 October 2022, McFaul announced his decision to retire from playing professional football.

== Honours ==
Sporting Fingal

- FAI Cup: 2009

St Patrick's Athletic

- League of Ireland Premier Division: 2013
- Leinster Senior Cup: 2011

Individual

- Sporting Fingal Player of the Year: 2009
- St Patrick's Athletic Supporters Club Player of the Month: July 2011
