= 2009–10 Setanta Sports Cup =

2009–2010 Setanta Sports Cup
Tournament details
- Country: Northern Ireland; Republic of Ireland
- Teams: 9

Final positions
- Champions: Bohemians (1st title)
- Runners-up: St Patrick's Athletic

Tournament statistics
- Matches played: 23
- Goals scored: 59 (2.57 per match)

The 2009–10 Setanta Sports Cup was the 5th staging of the cross-border Setanta Sports Cup competition - which featured football clubs from the Republic of Ireland and Northern Ireland. It commenced on 28 August 2009, and the final was played on 15 May 2010, with Bohemians defeating St Patrick's Athletic 1–0 to claim their first Setanta Cup triumph.

On 22 June 2009, the draw for the competition was postponed because of the financial troubles of organiser Setanta Sports. However, on 19 July 2009, it was confirmed that the competition would be going ahead as planned, and the draw was made at FAI headquarters in Abbotstown, Dublin, on 28 July.

== Changes to structure ==
"It is only fair for the tournament winners to be given the chance to defend their crown."

— Milo Corcoran, Chairman of Setanta Sports Cup Organising Committee

In the 2009–10 season, the Setanta Cup was expanded to nine teams, comprising three groups of three. The three group winners qualified for the semi-finals, as did the group runner-up with the best record. Teams were drawn from the top four of both leagues, with an additional place for the winners of the previous competition, Cork City. In a further change to the format of previous years, games were expected to take place on weekends instead of midweek.

== Group stages ==
Teams that progressed to the semi-finals are indicated in bold type.

Teams eliminated from the Setanta Sports Cup this stage are indicated in italics.

=== Group 1 ===
Team	Pld	W	D	L	GF	GA	GD	Pts
(Republic of Ireland) **Sligo Rovers**	4	3	1	0	11	4	+7	**10**
(Republic of Ireland) Cork City	4	1	1	2	3	8	-5	**4**
(Northern Ireland) Cliftonville	4	1	0	3	5	7	-2	**3**

29 August 2009

Cork City	1 – 0	Cliftonville
Gamble 37'	(Report)

Turners Cross, Cork

13 September 2009

Sligo Rovers	2 – 2	Cork City
Ryan 45'; Marshall 59'	(Report)	Silagailis 16'; Deasy 90'

Showgrounds, Sligo
Referee: (Republic of Ireland) Damien Hancock

3 October 2009

Cliftonville	2 – 3	Sligo Rovers
Boyce 9'; Bannon 67'	(Report)	Turner 24', 39'; Marshall 75'

Solitude, Belfast

9 November 2009

Cork City	P – P	Sligo Rovers
	(Report)

Turners Cross, Cork

Postponed due to waterlogged pitch

22 February 2010

Cork City	0 – 3	Sligo Rovers

Turners Cross, Cork

Due to Cork City's resignation from the competition, Sligo Rovers were awarded a 3-0 win

26 February 2010

Sligo Rovers	3 – 0	Cliftonville
Ventre 39'; Doyle 45'; Amond 86'	(Report)

Showgrounds, Sligo

13 March 2010

Cliftonville	3 – 0	Cork City

Solitude, Belfast

Due to Cork City's resignation from the competition, Cliftonville were awarded a 3-0 win

=== Group 2 ===
Team	Pld	W	D	L	GF	GA	GD	Pts
(Republic of Ireland) **Bohemians**	4	2	2	0	6	3	+3	**8**
(Northern Ireland) Glentoran	4	1	2	1	5	5	0	**5**
(Northern Ireland) Coleraine	4	0	2	2	3	6	-3	**2**

29 August 2009

Glentoran	1 – 2	Bohemians
Waterworth 51'	(Report)	McGuinness 61'; Byrne 88'

The Oval, Belfast
Referee: (Northern Ireland) David Malcolm

19 September 2009

Coleraine	0 – 0	Glentoran

The Showgrounds, Coleraine

6 October 2009

Bohemians	0 – 0	Coleraine
	(Report)

Dalymount Park, Dublin

3 November 2009

Glentoran	3 – 2	Coleraine
Waterworth 29'; Fordyce 59'; Hall 62'	(Report)	Boyce 6', 66'

The Oval, Belfast
Referee: (Northern Ireland) Raymond Crangle

27 February 2010

Coleraine	1 – 3	Bohemians
Patterson 2'	(Report)	Heary 27'; Rossiter 47'; Madden 81'

The Showgrounds, Coleraine

13 March 2010

Bohemians	1 – 1	Glentoran
Cretaro 61'	(Report)	Hamilton 51'

Dalymount Park, Dublin

=== Group 3 ===
Team	Pld	W	D	L	F	A	GD	Pts
(Northern Ireland) **Linfield**	4	2	2	0	6	2	+4	**8**
(Republic of Ireland) **St Patrick's Athletic**	4	1	2	1	5	3	+2	**5**
(Republic of Ireland) Derry City	4	0	2	2	2	8	-6	**2**

22 September 2009

Derry City	1 – 1	St Patrick's Athletic
Stewart 45' (pen.)	(Report)	Lester 56'

The Brandywell, Derry
Referee: (Republic of Ireland) Richie Winter

3 October 2009

Linfield	1 – 1	Derry City
Munster 14'	(Report)	McManus 85'

Windsor Park, Belfast

10 November 2009

St Patrick's Athletic	3 – 0	Derry City

Richmond Park, Dublin

Derry City ceased to exist, St Patrick's Athletic awarded 3-0 win

26 February 2010

St Patrick's Athletic	1 – 1	Linfield
Williams 15'	(Report)	Ervin 36' (pen.)

Richmond Park, Dublin

13 March 2010

Linfield	1 – 0	St Patrick's Athletic
Thompson 90'	(Report)

Windsor Park, Belfast

Derry City	0 – 3	Linfield

The Brandywell, Derry

Derry City ceased to exist, Linfield awarded 3-0 win

== Semi finals ==
Team 1	Agg.	Team 2	1st leg	2nd leg
Bohemians (Republic of Ireland)	3–1	(Northern Ireland) Linfield	2–1	1–0
St Patrick's Athletic (Republic of Ireland)	6–2	(Republic of Ireland) Sligo Rovers	4–1	2–1

=== First leg ===
3 April 2010

Bohemians	2 – 1	Linfield
Oman 43'; Cretaro 86'	(Report)	McAllister 16'; Kane (red card) 67'

Dalymount Park, Dublin
Referee: (Republic of Ireland) Thomas Connolly

13 April 2010

St Patrick's Athletic	4 – 1	Sligo Rovers
Byrne 9'; McAllister 37'; Coughlan 50'; Guy 85'	(Report)	Doninger 45'

Richmond Park, Dublin
Referee: (Republic of Ireland) Declan Hanney

=== Second leg ===
17 April 2010

Sligo Rovers	1 – 2	St Patrick's Athletic
O'Grady 5'	(Report)	Byrne 18'; Lynch 59'

Showgrounds, Sligo
Referee: (Northern Ireland) Trevor Moutray

St Patrick's Athletic won 6 − 2 on aggregate

19 April 2010

Linfield	0 – 1	Bohemians
	(Report)	Madden 5'

Windsor Park, Belfast

Bohemians won 3 − 1 on aggregate

== Final ==
15 May 2010
18:30

St Patrick's Athletic	0 – 1	Bohemians
	Report	Murphy 24'

Tallaght Stadium, Dublin
Attendance: 3,896
Referee: (Northern Ireland) Alan Black

Winner of 2009–10 Setanta Sports Cup
(Republic of Ireland) Bohemians
1st Title

== Goalscorers ==
2 goals

- (Northern Ireland) Darren Boyce (Coleraine)
- (Republic of Ireland) Paul Byrne (St Patrick's Athletic)
- (Republic of Ireland) Raffaele Cretaro (Bohemians)
- (Republic of Ireland) Paddy Madden (Bohemians)
- (Republic of Ireland) Dean Marshall (Sligo Rovers)
- (Republic of Ireland) Rob Turner (Sligo Rovers)
- (Northern Ireland) Andrew Waterworth (Glentoran)

1 goal

- (Republic of Ireland) Pádraig Amond (Sligo Rovers)
- (Northern Ireland) Jason Bannon (Cliftonville)
- (Northern Ireland) Liam Boyce (Cliftonville)
- (Republic of Ireland) Jason Byrne (Bohemians)
- (Republic of Ireland) Gareth Coughlan (St Patrick's Athletic)
- (Republic of Ireland) Paul Deasy (Cork City)
- (Republic of Ireland) Mark Doninger (Sligo Rovers)
- (Republic of Ireland) Eoin Doyle (Sligo Rovers)
- (Northern Ireland) Jim Ervin (Linfield)
- (Northern Ireland) Daryl Fordyce (Glentoran)
- (Republic of Ireland) Joe Gamble (Cork City)
- (United States) Ryan Guy (St Patrick's Athletic)
- (Northern Ireland) Andrew Hall (Glentoran)
- (Northern Ireland) Gary Hamilton (Glentoran)
- (Republic of Ireland) Owen Heary (Bohemians)
- (Republic of Ireland) John Lester (St Patrick's Athletic)
- (Republic of Ireland) Damian Lynch (St Patrick's Athletic)
- (Republic of Ireland) David McAllister (St Patrick's Athletic)
- (Northern Ireland) Mark McAllister (Linfield)
- (Republic of Ireland) Jason McGuinness (Bohemians)
- (Scotland) Tam McManus (Derry City)
- (Northern Ireland) Paul Munster (Linfield)
- (Republic of Ireland) Anto Murphy (Bohemians)
- (Republic of Ireland) Conor O'Grady (Sligo Rovers)
- (Republic of Ireland) Ken Oman (Bohemians)
- (Northern Ireland) Rory Patterson (Coleraine)
- (Republic of Ireland) Mark Rossiter (Bohemians)
- (Republic of Ireland) Richie Ryan (Sligo Rovers)
- (Latvia) Guntars Silagailis (Cork City)
- (Northern Ireland) Thomas Stewart (Derry City)
- (Northern Ireland) Peter Thompson (Linfield)
- (England) Danny Ventre (Sligo Rovers)
- (Republic of Ireland) Alex Williams (St Patrick's Athletic)
