= Gareth McGlynn =

Irish footballer

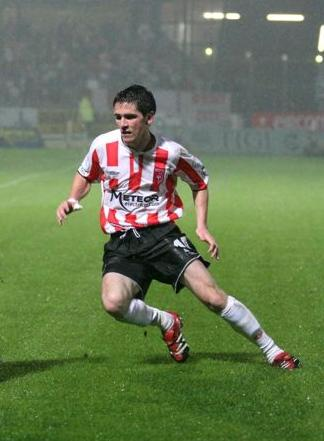
- McGlynn playing for Derry City

Personal information
- Full name: Gareth McGlynn
- Date of birth: 29 October 1982 (age 44)
- Place of birth: Donegal, Ireland
- Position: Winger

Team information
- Current team: Derry City
- Number: 14

Senior career*
Years	Team	Apps	(Gls)
2000–2009	Derry City	350	(47)
2010	Bohemians	28	(5)
2011	Derry City	27	(9)
2012–2014	Stirling Lions		
2014–2016	Lansdowne Bhoys		
2016	Derry City	6	(0)

International career
2000–2002	Republic of Ireland U21	2	(0)
2011	League of Ireland XI	2	(0)
- * Club domestic league appearances and goals as of 16 April 2016

Gareth McGlynn (born 29 October 1982 in Inch, Donegal, Ireland) is a retired footballer who played for Derry City.

== Career ==
=== Ireland ===
McGlynn broke into the Derry side at the age of 17. He made his debut in April 2001 in a 1–0 home victory over Kilkenny City with his first goal for the club arriving 10 days later during a 3–3 draw with Shelbourne. That goal made him the 100th player ever to score for Derry in the League of Ireland. His 200th appearance was made during a game with Drogheda United at United Park towards the end of the 2006 season.

An Irish youth international, McGlynn can play on the right or in the centre of midfield. A talented ball player, he has battled his way back into the team and impressed Stephen Kenny sufficiently to warrant a run in the side. In September 2006, two semi-final goals from McGlynn against Limerick helped Derry win 3-0 and thus qualify for the final of the League of Ireland Cup.

Gareth signed for Pat Fenlon's Bohemians in pre-season 2010 and scored his first goal for Bohemians against Drogheda United on 19 March 2010.

In the close season of 2010, McGlynn was linked with a move to his former club Derry City. McGlynn then re-signed for Derry City in January 2011.

=== Australia ===
He left Derry in December 2011 to go to Australia and signed for Stirling Lions in the Football West State League.

=== America ===
After Australia he travelled to New York, making his debut in March 2014 with Lansdowne Bhoys FC. He then went on to win two Cosmopolitan Soccer League titles in 2014 and 2015 with the Bhoys.

=== Back to Derry City ===
In 2016, he once again signed for Derry City on a one-year deal for his 3rd stint with the team.

== Honours ==
Derry City

- FAI Cup (2): 2002, 2006
- League of Ireland Cup (5): 2005, 2006, 2007, 2008, 2011

Bohemians

- Setanta Sports Cup (1): 2010

Lansdowne Bhoys FC

- Cosmopolitan Soccer League (2) 2014, 2015.
