= Derek Doyle =

Irish footballer

Personal information
- Date of birth: 30 April 1986 (age 40)
- Place of birth: Dublin, Ireland
- Position: Winger

Youth career
- Cherry Orchard

Senior career*
Years	Team	Apps	(Gls)
2004–2008	UCD	72	(8)
2008	Dundalk	11	(3)
2009	Shelbourne	23	(3)
2010–2011	St Patrick's Athletic	55	(13)
2012–2013	Crumlin United		
2013	Shelbourne	13	(1)
2014–2015	Athlone Town	28	(2)
2016	Drogheda United	9	(0)

International career
- Republic of Ireland U19
- * Club domestic league appearances and goals

Derek Doyle (born 30 April 1986) is an Irish former footballer.

== Career ==
Doyle was born in Dublin, and began his senior career with University College Dublin A.F.C. on a soccer scholarship. He made his debut for the Students as a 19-year-old coming on as a second-half substitute during a 1–1 league draw against Shelbourne on 3 June 2005 at Belfield Park and he scored his first goal against the same opposition at the same venue the following season on 22 April 2006. Doyle earned a reputation as an attacking midfielder contributing 11 goals and numerous assists during his spell at Belfield Park before a leg-break in a league fixture against Sligo Rovers in 2007 curtailed that season. He also won two successive Dr. Tony O'Neill Under 21 League titles with UCD in both 2004 and 2005. After 4 years with the Belfield club, Doyle departed UCD who were at the foot of the Premier Division table midway through the 2008 season to join First Division title contenders Dundalk. Doyle made his Dundalk debut as second-half substitute against Wexford Youths at Oriel Park on 31 July 2008 in a 1–0 victory for the Lilywhites. He scored his first Dundalk goal in a 2–2 away draw to Athlone Town at Lissywollen on 8 September 2008. Doyle's move to Dundalk turned out to be an astute move as he contributed 3 goals in 11 appearances as the Lilywhites dramatically took the First Division title on the final night of the season.

Despite Dundalk's success in securing the First Division title and promotion to the Premier Division, Doyle was one of 19 first team players not offered a new contract for Dundalk's 2009 campaign. It was not long before Doyle found himself a new club, he signed for Shelbourne on 23 December 2008 aiming to win his second successive First Division title for 2009. Doyle made his Shelbourne debut on 6 March 2009 as a second-half substitute during a 2–1 victory over Wexford Youths at Tolka Park. He scored his first Shelbourne goal on 24 April 2009 during a 2–0 league victory over Athlone Town at Tolka Park. Doyle made a total of 27 competitive appearances for Shelbourne in 2009, scoring 3 goals as Shelbourne finished First Division runners-up. He parted company with Shelbourne at the end of 2009 and he subsequently linked up with his former UCD manager Pete Mahon at St. Patrick's Athletic for the 2010 Premier Division season. Derek scored a hat-trick against Galway United FC in a 4–2 win for the supersaints on 2 July 2010 as the saints came from 2–1 down to win. In the 2011 season he started the season well chipping in with goals from the left wing. On 7 July 2011 Doyle scored the winner in their Europa League game against Íþróttabandalag Vestmannaeyja with a close range header. Doyle also scored in their next Europa League qualifier against FC Shakhter Karagandy.

== Honours ==
UCD

- Under 21 League of Ireland (2): 2004, 2005

Dundalk

- League of Ireland First Division (1): 2008

St Patrick's Athletic

- Leinster Senior Cup (1): 2011
