= 2010 League of Ireland Premier Division =

League of Ireland Premier Division
- Season: 2010
- Champions: Shamrock Rovers (16th title)
- UEFA Champions League: Shamrock Rovers
- UEFA Europa League: Bohemians; Sligo Rovers; St. Patrick's Athletic
- Setanta Cup: Shamrock Rovers; Bohemians; Sligo Rovers; St. Patrick's Athletic; Dundalk; UCD
- Matches: 180
- Goals: 479 (2.66 per match)
- Top goalscorer: Gary Twigg: 20 (Shamrock Rovers)
- Biggest home win: Sligo Rovers 6–0 Drogheda United
- Biggest away win: Bray Wanderers 0–6 UCD
- Highest scoring: Sligo Rovers 4–3 Sporting Fingal
- Longest winning run: Shamrock Rovers (6)
- Longest unbeaten run: Shamrock Rovers (17)
- Longest losing run: Drogheda United (5)
- Highest attendance: Shamrock Rovers–St. Patrick's Athletic (5500)
- Lowest attendance: Bray Wanderers–Sligo Rovers (300)
- Average attendance: 1,657

The 2010 League of Ireland Premier Division was the 26th season of the League of Ireland Premier Division. The division was made up of 10 teams. Shamrock Rovers were champions while Bohemians finished as runners-up.

== Teams ==
Location of teams in the 2010 League of Ireland Premier Division

=== Stadiums and locations ===
Team	Base	Stadium
Bohemians	Phibsborough	Dalymount Park
Bray Wanderers	Bray	Carlisle Grounds
Drogheda United	Drogheda	United Park
Dundalk	Dundalk	Oriel Park
Galway United	Galway	Terryland Park
Shamrock Rovers	Tallaght	Tallaght Stadium
Sligo Rovers	Sligo	The Showgrounds
Sporting Fingal	Fingal	Morton Stadium
St. Patrick's Athletic	Inchicore	Richmond Park
UCD	Belfield	UCD Bowl

=== Personnel and kits ===
Note: Flags indicate national team as has been defined under FIFA eligibility rules. Players may hold more than one non-FIFA nationality.

Team	Manager	Captain	Kit manufacturer	Shirt sponsor
Bohemians	(Republic of Ireland) Pat Fenlon	(Republic of Ireland) Owen Heary	Umbro	Des Kelly Interiors
Bray Wanderers	(Republic of Ireland) Eddie Gormley	(Republic of Ireland) Daire Doyle	Umbro	Sports World
Drogheda United	(Republic of Ireland) Alan Mathews	(Republic of Ireland) Alan McNally	Vandanel	Hunky Dorys
Dundalk	(England) Ian Foster	(Northern Ireland) Liam Burns	Umbro	FastFixDirect
Galway United	(Northern Ireland) Sean Connor	(Republic of Ireland) Barry Ryan	Rival	Papa John's
Shamrock Rovers	(Northern Ireland) Michael O'Neill	(England) Dan Murray	Umbro	Woodie's DIY
Sligo Rovers	(England) Paul Cook	(Republic of Ireland) Richie Ryan	Jako	Tohers
Sporting Fingal	(Republic of Ireland) Liam Buckley	(Republic of Ireland) Shaun Maher	O'Neills	Keelings
St Patrick's Athletic	(Republic of Ireland) Pete Mahon	(Republic of Ireland) Damian Lynch	Umbro	Nissan
UCD	(Republic of Ireland) Martin Russell	(Republic of Ireland) Evan McMillan	O'Neills	O'Neills

== Overview ==
Airtricity were announced as the new main sponsor for the League of Ireland on 26 February. The prize fund for the season was set at €911,000. The 2010 Premier Division featured 10 clubs. The regular season began on 5 March and concluded on 29 October. Each team played every other team four times, totalling 36 matches.

Holders Bohemians held on to manager Pat Fenlon despite interest from Dundee United and Galway United's financial worries were eased with a cash injection from an investor.

On the final day of the season, Shamrock Rovers won the title with a 2–2 draw away to Bray Wanderers. Second placed Bohemians finished level on points with Rovers but lost out on goal difference.

== Final table ==
Pos	Team	Pld	W	D	L	GF	GA	GD	Pts	Qualification or relegation
1	Shamrock Rovers (C)	36	19	10	7	57	34	+23	67	Qualification for Champions League second qualifying round
2	Bohemians	36	19	10	7	50	29	+21	67	Qualification for Europa League second qualifying round
3	Sligo Rovers	36	17	12	7	61	36	+25	63	Qualification for Europa League third qualifying round (Note: Sligo Rovers qualified for the UEFA Europa League third qualifying round after winning the 2010 FAI Cup Final.)
4	Sporting Fingal (R)	36	16	14	6	60	38	+22	62	Withdrew from league (Note: Sporting Fingal withdrew from League of Ireland due to financial difficulties shortly before the 2011 Premier Division season.)
5	St Patrick's Athletic	36	16	9	11	55	33	+22	57	Qualification for Europa League first qualifying round
6	Dundalk	36	14	6	16	46	50	−4	48	
7	UCD	36	11	8	17	47	54	−7	41	
8	Galway United (O)	36	9	11	16	38	59	−21	38	Qualification for relegation play-off
9	Bray Wanderers (O)	36	6	9	21	35	72	−37	27	Qualification for relegation play-off
10	Drogheda United	36	4	9	23	30	74	−44	21	Spared from relegation (Note: Drogheda United were originally relegated but retained their place in the Premier Division after Sporting Fingal withdrew.)

Rules for classification: 1) points; 2) goal difference; 3) number of goals scored.
(C) Champions; (O) Play-off winners; (R) Relegated

== Results ==
=== Matches 1–18 ===
Home \ Away	BOH	BRW	DRO	DUN	GAL	SHM	SLI	SFI	StP	UCD
Bohemians	—	2–0	1–0	3–0	2–3	0–0	0–0	1–0	1–1	0–0
Bray Wanderers	0–2	—	2–2	0–1	0–2	0–0	2–3	1–3	0–4	0–6
Drogheda United	2–4	0–0	—	1–3	0–1	0–2	2–2	1–1	2–1	0–3
Dundalk	1–0	2–3	2–2	—	0–0	2–1	1–0	1–2	0–0	3–0
Galway United	2–2	2–1	3–1	0–1	—	0–1	0–0	2–2	0–2	2–2
Shamrock Rovers	1–0	1–0	1–1	0–2	2–0	—	1–1	1–1	0–2	0–0
Sligo Rovers	1–2	5–1	6–0	2–2	1–0	1–1	—	0–1	0–0	2–1
Sporting Fingal	0–2	1–0	4–1	2–1	2–0	1–1	1–1	—	2–3	1–2
St Patrick's Athletic	3–1	3–0	0–1	1–0	2–0	1–2	1–0	0–0	—	3–0
UCD	1–2	1–0	2–0	3–1	0–0	1–2	0–2	0–0	1–0	—

Source: loi.ie
Legend: Blue = home team win; Yellow = draw; Red = away team win.

=== Matches 19–36 ===
Home \ Away	BOH	BRW	DRO	DUN	GAL	SHM	SLI	SFI	StP	UCD
Bohemians	—	0–0	2–0	3–1	0–2	1–0	2–0	1–1	1–1	3–1
Bray Wanderers	0–3	—	1–1	2–0	4–0	2–2	1–3	0–3	3–2	2–2
Drogheda United	0–1	0–2	—	1–3	3–3	0–2	2–3	0–4	0–3	1–0
Dundalk	1–2	0–2	2–1	—	3–0	5–1	2–4	0–2	0–3	1–1
Galway United	3–2	2–2	2–1	1–1	—	0–1	2–2	0–1	1–1	1–4
Shamrock Rovers	3–0	4–1	2–0	4–0	3–0	—	1–0	1–2	2–1	4–1
Sligo Rovers	1–1	2–1	2–1	1–0	3–0	1–2	—	4–3	1–0	4–0
Sporting Fingal	0–0	2–2	1–2	1–0	3–1	3–3	1–1	—	2–2	4–1
St Patrick's Athletic	0–1	2–0	2–0	1–2	4–2	1–3	0–0	1–1	—	2–1
UCD	0–2	4–0	1–1	0–2	0–1	3–2	1–2	1–2	3–2	—

Source: soccerway.com
Legend: Blue = home team win; Yellow = draw; Red = away team win.

== Top goalscorers ==
Rank	Scorer	Team	Goals
1	(Scotland) Gary Twigg	Shamrock Rovers	20
2	(Republic of Ireland) Pádraig Amond	Sligo Rovers	17
3	(Republic of Ireland) Ciarán Kilduff	UCD	15
4	(Republic of Ireland) Jake Kelly	Bray Wanderers	14
5	(Republic of Ireland) Jason Byrne	Bohemians	12
5	(Bosnia and Herzegovina) Fahrudin Kuduzović	Dundalk	12

== Promotion/relegation play-off ==
The eighth and ninth placed teams from the Premier Division, Galway United and Bray Wanderers, played off after the regular season was completed. The winner would retain a place in the 2011 Premier Division. The loser would play off against the winner of the 2010 First Division play off. The winner of this match would also gain a place in the 2010 Premier Division.

Premier Division

2 November 2010	Galway United	1 – 0	Bray Wanderers	Terryland Park
19:45 GMT	Karl Sheppard 16'; Derek O'Brien (red card) 90+2'	Report	Adam Mitchell (red card) 82'	Attendance: 1,432; Referee: Damien Hancock (Dublin)

Galway United retained their place in the 2011 Premier Division

Premier Division v First Division

5 November 2010	Monaghan United	0 – 0	Bray Wanderers	Kingspan Century Park
19.45 GMT		Report	Matt Gregg (red card) 89'	Referee: Damien Hancock (Dublin)

8 November 2010	Bray Wanderers	1 – 1 (a.e.t.) (7 – 6 p)	Monaghan United	Carlisle Grounds
19.45 GMT	Jake Kelly 120+2'	Report	Chris Shields 118' (o.g.)	Referee: Declan Hanney (Dublin)
	Penalties
	Gary Dempsey (penalty scored); Jake Kelly (penalty scored); Gary Shaw (penalty missed); Dane Massey (penalty scored); Danny O'Connor (penalty scored) Daire Doyle (penalty scored); Shane O'Neill (penalty scored); Chris Shields (penalty scored)		(penalty scored) Karl Bermingham; (penalty scored) Philip Hughes; (penalty scored) Brian Gartland; (penalty scored) Barry Clancy; (penalty missed) Alan Byrne (penalty scored) Dom Tierney; (penalty scored) Stephen McCrossan; (penalty missed) Paul Whelan

Bray Wanderers won 7 – 6 on penalties and retained their place in the Premier Division

== See also ==
- 2010 League of Ireland First Division
- 2010 A Championship
- 2010 FAI Cup
- 2010 League of Ireland Cup
- 2010 Shamrock Rovers F.C. season
- 2010 St Patrick's Athletic F.C. season
- List of 2009–10 League of Ireland transfers
