= Ryan Guy =

Soccer player (born 1985)

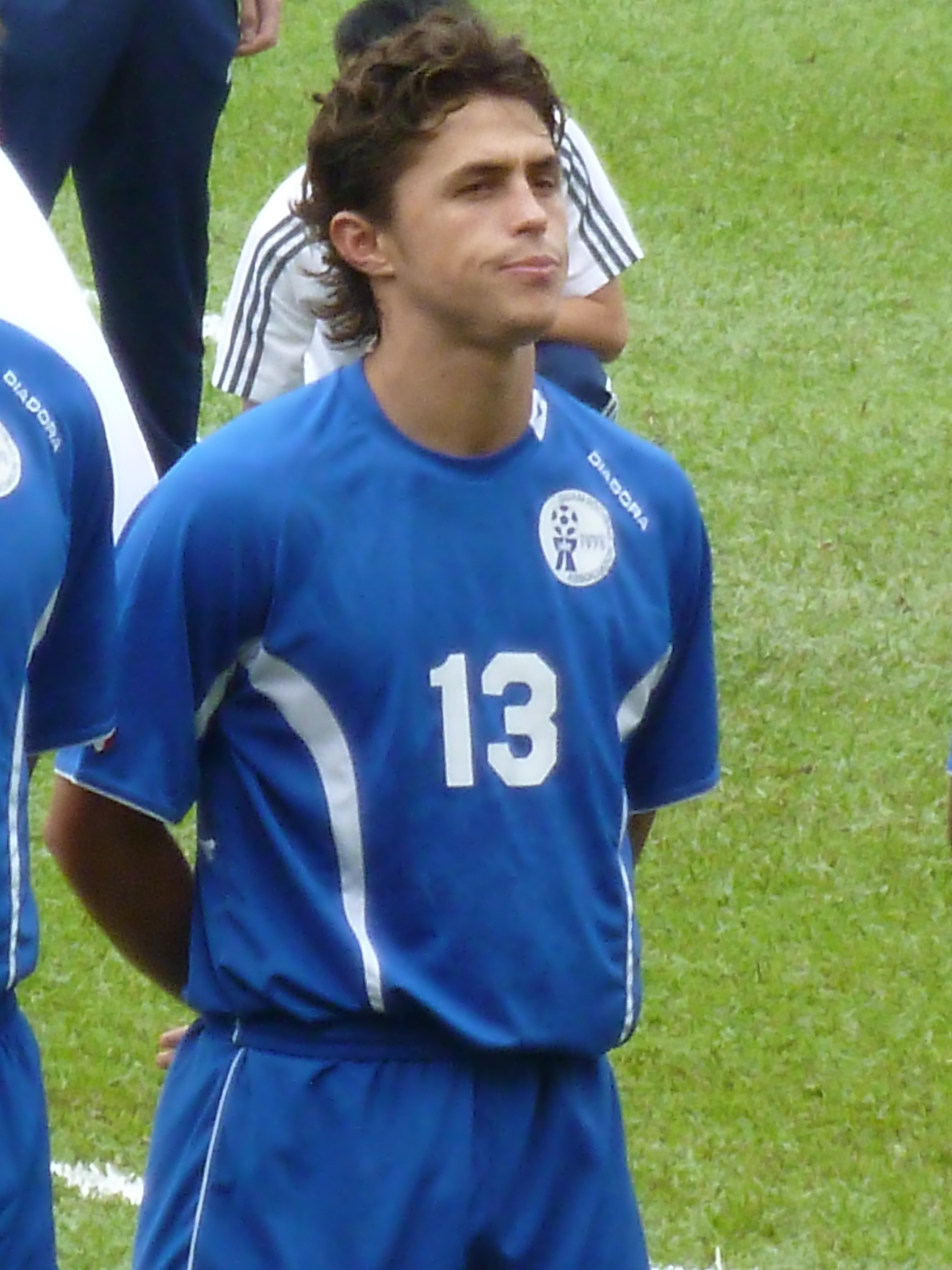

Personal information
- Full name: Ryan Michael Guy
- Date of birth: September 5, 1985 (age 41)
- Place of birth: Carlsbad, California, United States
- Height: 5 ft 7 in (1.70 m)
- Position: Winger

Team information
- Current team: San Diego Surf (youth coach)

College career
Years	Team	Apps	(Gls)
2003–2006	San Diego Toreros	79	(14)

Senior career*
Years	Team	Apps	(Gls)
2005	Boulder Rapids Reserve	14	(2)
2006	Southern California Fusion		
2007–2010	St Patrick's Athletic	114	(24)
2011	San Diego Flash		
2011-2013	New England Revolution	45	(4)
2014	San Antonio Scorpions	3	(0)
2016–2018	SoCal Surf		

International career^{‡}
2012–2016	Guam	33	(4)

Managerial career
- 2016–2018: SoCal Surf (player-coach)
- * Club domestic league appearances and goals as of April 16, 2016 ‡ National team caps and goals as of 12 November 2016

Ryan Michael Guy (born September 5, 1985) is a soccer coach and former professional player. He was capped 33 times and scored four goals for the Guam national team.

== Early career ==
=== High School and Club ===
Guy attended La Costa Canyon High School where he was named MVP for its soccer team twice. Here he also competed in their respective Track team where he also received MVP Honors. During his senior year, he reached the California Interscholastic Federation (CIF) Final.

During this time Guy also played with San Diego Surf SC, where he also reached the State Sup Final. He also played for the youth side La Jolla Nomads.

=== College ===
After attending, Guy was awarded a scholarship at the University of San Diego. In his sophomore season Guy earned First Team All–West Coast Conference and 2nd Team–NSCAA All-West Region honors. Here he received the honor of his sides all time leading assist maker with 24.

During his college years, Guy also played for both Boulder Rapids Reserve in the USL Premier Development League and Southern California Fusion in the National Premier Soccer League.

== Club career ==
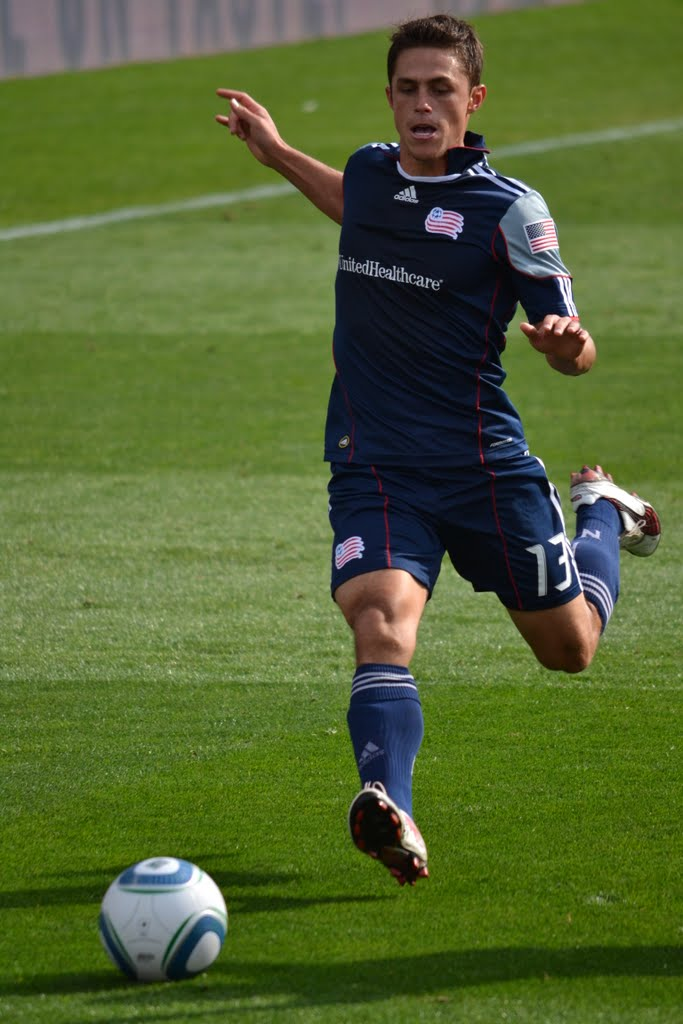
Guy in action for New England Revolution in 2011.

=== St. Patrick's Athletic ===
After graduating College, Guy was offered a place in the MLS Combine. After scoring a goal in one of three Combine friendly matches, Guy was drafted in the 2nd round (22nd overall pick) of the 2007 MLS SuperDraft by FC Dallas. Despite being offered a developmental contract by Dallas, after the recommendations John Harkes and Frankie Heyduk, Guy instead spent time trialing across Europe in search for a professional contract. He attended trials at a number of clubs, including Crystal Palace and Hannover 96. He was unable to sign with Crystal Palace due to work permit issues but impressed enough to find an agent who would convinve him to trial with St. Patrick's Athletic and in February 2007 he signed a professional contract with the Dublin Club. He made his League of Ireland debut for the Irish club on April 6, 2007, coming on as a substitute in the 83rd minute of a 1–0 win over Galway United. He scored his first goal for the Saints on the 15 July.

On July 17, 2008, in a UEFA Cup First Qualifying Round match against JFK Olimps Riga of Latvia, guy would complete a diving-header to score St. Patrick's Athletics first ever away goal in European football while also leading to the club's first-ever away European win. On October 18, Guy scored a hat trick in a 3–1 win over Shamrock Rovers in the South-Dublin derby.

In 2009, Guy helped guide St. Pat's past Valletta F.C. & Krylia Sovetov Samara in the 2009-10 UEFA Europa League 2nd & 3rd qualifying rounds, however Guy's St. Pat's side lost to FC Steaua București in the play-off round 5–1 on aggregate. Ryan Guy was voted the St Patrick's Athletic Supporters Club Player of the Year for 2009. He made 44 appearances across all competitions and scored 6 goals. He scored the opening goal of the 2010 League of Ireland season, which was also the first ever goal in the Airtricity League.

On August 4, 2010, Guy and Joey N'do were the only two foreign players selected for a League of Ireland XI in a friendly match against Manchester United. The match marked the first football game played at the newly renovated Aviva Stadium.

In January 2011 after 114 appearances and 14 european appearances, he left St. Pats for "personal reasons" to return to his homeland.

=== Return to the United States ===
Upon his return to the US, Guy had a short stint with the San Diego Flash of the National Premier Soccer League, and trialled with the Portland Timbers and FC Dallas.

==== New England Revolution ====
After injury to right-winger Sainey Nyassi, a trial and recommendation from San Diego Flash head coach Warren Barton lead New England Revolution Head-Coach Steve Nicol to sign Guy mid-season on June 9, 2011. Guy made his Revolution debut on June 18, 2011, coming on as a 71st-minute substitute for Chris Tierney in a 1-1 draw against the Chicago Fire. He made his first start the following week, on June 26 in a 2-1 loss to Seattle Sounders.

On September 25, 2011, Guy would contribute his first goals for the side scoring a late brace against Chicago Fire in a 3-2 loss. He made a total of 11 appearances in the 2011 season for the Revolution, including six starts.

In 2012, Guy made 23 appearances, including 20 starts at several different positions. He recorded his first career assist on March 31, against the LA Galaxy.

After 3 seasons with the side Guy left after 45 appearances, 4 goals and over 3000 minutes of game time.

==== Later career ====
He later went on to sign for NASL club San Antonio Scorpions.

Although spending time assisting with the coaching of the youth sides he played under in his professional career, in 2016 he joined Premier Development League (PDL) side North County Battalion as his first job in professional coaching under a player-coaching role. Guy was appointed head-coach of three teams and assistant to two others. Reaching the playoffs in his first season he became regarded as one of the best young coaches in the region. During this time Guy also served as an assistant director of coaching. In 2018 he decided to step down from role as head-coach in order to focus on his family life and birth of his third child.

== International career ==
Despite the possibility of a late United States men's national soccer team Cap, over the course of 6 months, head coach Gary White contacted Guy and convinced him to represent the Guam National Team, who he was eligible to represent through his father. Guy was played a lead role in a 10 year process planned by White to develop the national team as one of the best sides in East-Asia

Guy made his International debut for Guam in the Philippine Peace Cup, and featured in all 3 group games.

On June 11, 2015, Guy was part of a Guam side that beat Turkmenistan 1-0 to record Guam's first World Cup qualifying win in their history. The only goal in the game coming from an own-goal caused by Guy's signature long throw.

== Style of Play ==
Though he played the majority of his career as a forward, Guy has the versatility to play across in a multitude of positions across the pitch. During his two years at New England Revolution he showcased versatility by playing in nearly every position on the field, though he didn't spend an extended period in any single role. Guy credits this period as a key influence on his understanding of football tactics, helping him develop a better grasp of positioning, roles, and responsibilities, skills he believes have enhanced his coaching ability while also being cited as a natural leader.

While being played primarily as a right winger at St. Patricks Athletic where he displayed consistent technical talent. Guy favored cutting in and making inside-forward runs into the box.

Guy was known for executing accrobatic front flip throw-ins. One of which he performed for League of Ireland XI against Manchester United in front of a crowd of 49,861 fans.

== Personal life ==
Guy was born in Carlsbad, San Diego County, California to Jesse Anderson Lujan, a politician, and KUAM-FM talkshow host, and Sandra Guy-Willoughby.

Guy attended La Costa Canyon High School, where he was an honor student receiving honorary academic captain for senior year by The San Diego Union-Tribune. After graduating he attended San Diego University despite being recruited by California Institute of Technology, Saint Mary's College of California, UCLA, Pennsylvania State University and Boston University. Guy graduated with a Bachelor's degree in Political Science.

In 2014, Guy Co-founded exercise equipment business Gurilla Battalion with his former equipment manager Rob deGuzman at the Guam National Team set up. They focused on manufacturing rope based foam rollers as a solution to the high import cost of modern conventional foam rollers.

He is married to his wife Nicole and has 3 kids.

== Career statistics ==
=== International goals ===
Score and Result lists Guam's goals first

#	Date	Venue	Opponent	Score	Result	Competition	Reference
1	November 19, 2013	Olympic Stadium, Phnom Penh, Cambodia	Cambodia	1–0	2–0	Friendly	
2	July 23, 2014	GFA National Training Center, Harmon, Guam	Mongolia	1–0	2–0	2015 EAFF East Asian Cup	
3	July 23, 2014	GFA National Training Center, Harmon, Guam	Mongolia	2–0	2–0	2015 EAFF East Asian Cup	
4	July 25, 2014	GFA National Training Center, Harmon, Guam	Northern Mariana Islands	3–0	5–0	Preliminary round 1 EAFF East Asian cup	

== Honours ==
- St Patrick's Athletic F.C. Player of the Year (1): 2009
- North American Soccer League NASL Cup (1): 2014
