= Eric McGill =

Irish association footballer

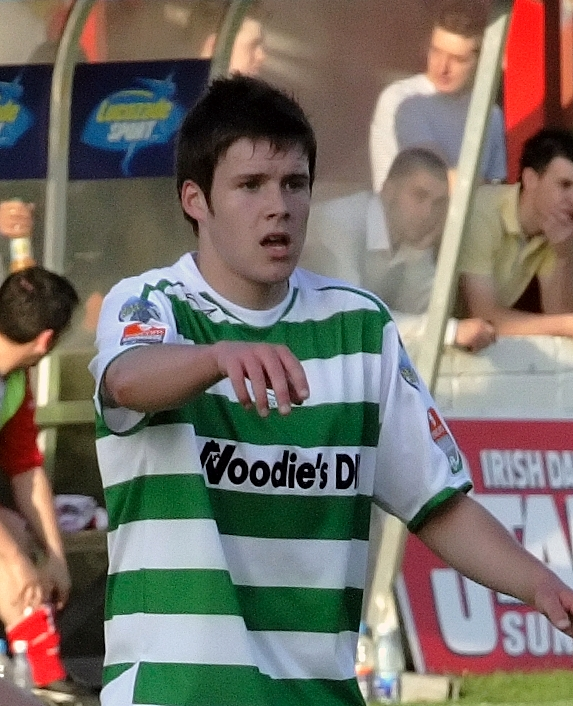

Personal information
- Full name: Eric McGill
- Date of birth: 16 October 1987 (age 39)
- Place of birth: Dublin, Ireland
- Position: Midfielder

Youth career
- 2003–2006: Shamrock Rovers

Senior career*
Years	Team	Apps	(Gls)
2006–2009	Shamrock Rovers	41	(0)
2009–2010	Drogheda United	37	(1)
2011–2013	Mount Merrion YMCA		
2013–2014	Crumlin United		
2014	Bray Wanderers	18	(0)
- * Club domestic league appearances and goals as of 00:56, 26 October 2013 (UTC)

Eric McGill (born 16 October 1987) is an Irish footballer who last played for Bray Wanderers in the League of Ireland. He made his professional debut for Shamrock Rovers as a late substitute in the FAI cup game against Castlebar Celtic. McGill signed for Drogheda United on 31 July 2009.
