= Keelings =

Irish produce-grower and distributor

- Company type: Unlimited company
- Industry: Produce
- Founded: 1926; 100 years ago
- Headquarters: North of Dublin, Ireland
- Area served: Ireland
- Products: Strawberries, raspberries, blueberries, blackberries, cherries, apples, pineapples, peppers
- Owner: Joe Keeling
- Website: keelings.ie

Keelings is a major produce grower and distributor operating at St. Margaret's, County Dublin, Ireland.

The Keeling family began growing fruit in 1926 and the business continues to be operated by the Keeling family.

The brand specialises in strawberries, blueberries and blackberries, with growing capacity for 100 million strawberries annually.

== History ==
Keelings is Ireland's largest fruit and vegetable distributor. Keelings is a 100% family-owned business and has been producing fruit and salads on its farms in North Dublin since the 1930s. Caroline Keeling is the CEO, a part of the 3rd generation of Keelings to run the family business, having taken over from her father in 2006 as CEO after working her way up the ranks from when she first joined the business in 1994 as technical manager. Since 2006, the company has expanded to include 5 divisions (Keelings Retail, Keelings Farm Fresh, Keelings Market, Keelings International and Keelings Solutions) with operations in the UK, Europe and Asia.

During the COVID-19 pandemic in the Republic of Ireland the company gained widespread controversy over its decision to hire seasonal workers from Bulgaria and elsewhere in Eastern Europe during the government-mandated lockdown. The company indicated that it had problems recruiting sufficient pickers locally, and that the skilled workers flown in would start work only after the required self-isolation period was completed.
