= Ciarán McGuigan =

Northern Irish footballer

Personal information
- Date of birth: 8 December 1989 (age 36)
- Place of birth: Newry, Northern Ireland
- Position: Defender

Senior career*
Years	Team	Apps	(Gls)
2007–2008	Glenavon		
2008–2009	Armagh City		
2010	Dundalk	23	(1)
2011–2013	Syrianska	21	(1)
2013	Warrenpoint Town	0	(0)
2014	Drogheda United	26	(0)
2015–2016	Lansdowne Bhoys FC	14	(0)
2017	Drogheda United	18	(1)
- * Club domestic league appearances and goals

Ciarán McGuigan (born 8 December 1989) is a Northern Irish former footballer who last played for Drogheda United of the League of Ireland.

== Career ==
Ciarán is a Northern Irish footballer who started his career off with Glenavon in the IFA Premiership. He also had spells with Armagh City and was also linked with a few SPL teams including Motherwell.

Ciarán made his first-team league debut at the start of the 2010 season with Dundalk as a second-half substitute against Bray Wanderers on 5 March. In only his third league appearance, again as a substitute, he scored Dundalk's second goal in a 2–2 draw with Sligo Rovers on 5 April.

On 12 January 2011, McGuigan signed a one-year contract with Syrianska, with hopes of an extension after the season's end.

McGuigan signed for Drogheda United for the 2014 season

== Move to America ==
He left Drogheda United after the 2014 season to work with his father in Brooklyn, New York. Ciaran currently plays for Lansdowne Bhoys FC of the Bronx, New York.
