= Conor Sinnott =

Irish footballer

Personal information
- Date of birth: 19 January 1986 (age 40)
- Place of birth: Wexford, Ireland
- Position: Centre midfielder

Youth career
- All Blacks FC

Senior career*
Years	Team	Apps	(Gls)
2005	Bray Wanderers	3	(0)
2005	Reading	0	(0)
2006	→ Limerick (loan)	17	(1)
2007–2009	Wexford Youths	91	(11)
2010	St Patrick's Athletic	7	(1)
2010	Drogheda United	8	(0)
2011	Waterford United	22	(5)
- * Club domestic league appearances and goals

Conor Sinnott (born 19 January 1986) is an Irish former footballer.

== Career ==
Conor started his schoolboy career with Rosslare Rangers, in Wexford, before moving on to the All Blacks where he came to the notice of the Wexford Schoolboy League representative sides and was capped by the Irish under 14 team. After captaining the, Mick Wallace managed, Wexford League under 18 team to All Ireland inter league success in 2005 Conor signed for Bray Wanderers and made a number of appearances before the end of the season.

The midfielder left his job as a green-keeper at Rosslare Golf Club and joined Reading in January 2006 after impressing in trials from October 2005 onwards. Sinnott was on non-contract terms with Reading and he joined Limerick on loan from July 2006 until the end of the 2006 League of Ireland in November. He was released by Reading and then signed for his home town club Wexford Youths for the 2007 season.

Sinnott achieved a notable milestone in his career by scoring Wexford Youths FC's first ever competitive goal. He scored from a freekick as Wexford Youths came from 2–0 down to draw 2–2 with Monaghan United. He finished the 2007 season as Wexford Youths top scorer with eight goals. He was also named in the PFAI First Division team of the year 2007.

In 2008 Sinnott was once again named in the PFAI First Division team of the year and was one of three players nominated for the PFAI First Division player of the year.

Conor signed for St Patrick's Athletic in January 2010, and was then released by mutual consent in July of that year.

He then joined Drogheda United during the July transfer window making his debut in a home defeat to Shamrock Rovers. Sinnott has moved on to Waterford United for the 2011 season.
