= Paul Byrne (footballer, born 1986) =

Irish footballer

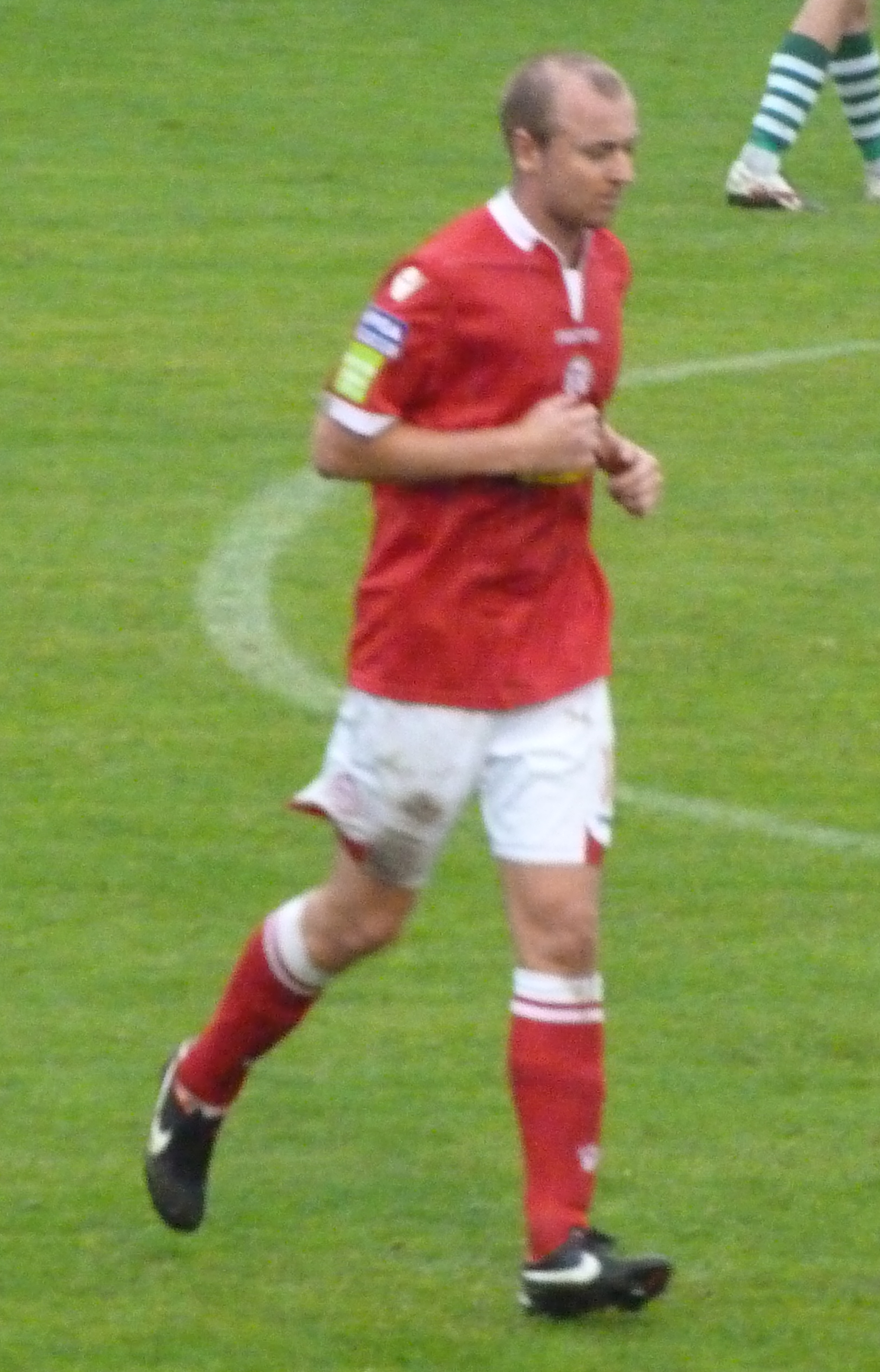

Personal information
- Date of birth: 19 May 1986 (age 40)
- Place of birth: Dublin, Ireland
- Position: Forward

Youth career
- Cherry Orchard

Senior career*
Years	Team	Apps	(Gls)
2004–2008	UCD	57	(16)
2008	Sporting Fingal	14	(2)
2009	Bray Wanderers	24	(2)
2010	St. Patrick's Athletic	25	(4)
2011	Ballarat Red Devils	4	(1)
2011	Monaghan United	4	(0)
2012	Shelbourne	11	(1)
- * Club domestic league appearances and goals

Paul Byrne (born 19 May 1986) is an Irish footballer who last played as a forward for League of Ireland Premier Division club Shelbourne.

== Career ==
=== UCD ===
Byrne began his League of Ireland career with UCD on a sports scholarship in 2004 following his spell in schoolboy football with Cherry Orchard. After making an impressive impact with UCD's Under 21 side, Byrne was promoted to UCD's first team towards the end of their 2004 First Division campaign where he scored 3 goals in 4 appearances helping UCD to promotion. A series of injuries restricted Byrne to limited appearances for UCD over the 2005 and 2006 seasons but an injury-free run in 2007 saw Byrne score 7 goals in all competitions for the Students. In his spell with UCD, Byrne was one of a select few who won the Under-21 league championship on three occasions in 2004, 2005 and 2007.

=== Sporting Fingal/Bray Wanderers ===
Byrne departed UCD mid-way through the 2008 season to join First Division side Sporting Fingal. Byrne made 16 appearances in all competitions scoring 2 goals helping Fingal to 3rd place finish in their inaugural season of League of Ireland football. As Sporting Fingal moved in a direction to full-time football, Byrne parted company with the club and he returned to the Premier Division in 2009 with Bray Wanderers. Despite a frustrating season in front of goal with just 3 goals, Byrne remained an ever present figure in the Seagulls starting XI making 28 appearances in all competitions. Bray were relegated from the Premier Division following a promotion/relegation play-off defeat to his most recent club Sporting Fingal.

=== St. Patrick's Athletic/Monagahan United ===
Byrne followed his former UCD manager Pete Mahon to St. Patrick's Athletic for 2010 Premier Division season. A number of impressive displays saw Byrne help St. Pats' to a title challenge and a Setanta Sports Cup final before injury limited his appearances in the 2nd half of the season. Byrne departed St. Patrick's Athletic at the end of the 2010 season to relocate to Australia. In Australia he linked up with former League of Ireland Player Brian Shelley at Victoria club Ballarat Red Devils. Byrne decided to return to Ireland mid-season and joined up with First Division title challengers Monaghan United. He was restricted to substitute appearances as Monaghan secured promotion back to the Premier Division.

=== Shelbourne ===
Byrne joined newly promoted Premier Division club Shelbourne on 9 February 2012 for the 2012 campaign.

== Career statistics ==
Correct as of 10 October 2012.

Club	Season	League	League		FAI Cup		League Cup		Other (Note: Competitions include Setanta Sports Cup, League of Ireland promotion/relegation play-offs and Leinster Senior Cup)		Total	
Club	Season	League	Apps	Goals	Apps	Goals	Apps	Goals	Apps	Goals	Apps	Goals
UCD	2004	First Division	4	3	0	0	0	0	-	-	4	3
UCD	2005	Premier Division	5	1	0	0	0	0	-	-	5	1
UCD	2006	Premier Division	14	2	3	0	1	1	-	-	18	3
UCD	2007	Premier Division	19	7	2	0	0	0	-	-	21	7
UCD	2008	Premier Division	15	3	0	0	0	0	-	-	15	3
UCD	Total		57	16	5	0	1	1	-	-	63	17
Sporting Fingal	2008	First Division	14	2	2	0	0	0	-	-	16	2
Sporting Fingal	Total		14	2	2	0	0	0	-	-	16	2
Bray Wanderers	2009	Premier Division	24	2	2	1	0	0	2	0	28	3
Bray Wanderers	Total		24	2	2	1	0	0	2	0	28	3
St. Patrick's Athletic	2010	Premier Division	25	4	1	0	1	0	6	2	33	6
St. Patrick's Athletic	Total		25	4	1	0	1	0	6	2	33	6
Ballarat Red Devils	2011	Victoria 2NW	4	1	0	0	0	0	-	-	4	1
Ballarat Red Devils	Total		4	1	0	0	0	0	-	-	4	1
Monaghan United	2011	First Division	4	0	1	0	0	0	1	0	6	0
Monaghan United	Total		4	0	1	0	0	0	1	0	6	0
Shelbourne	2012	Premier Division	11	1	3	0	1	0	1	1	16	2
Shelbourne	Total		11	1	3	0	1	0	1	1	16	2
Career total			139	26	14	1	3	1	10	3	166	31
