= Conor O'Grady =

Irish footballer

Personal information
- Date of birth: 27 May 1980 (age 46)
- Place of birth: Sligo, Ireland
- Position: Midfielder

Senior career*
Years	Team	Apps	(Gls)
1997–2001	Sligo Rovers	?	(?)
2001–2003	Cork City	?	(6)
2004	Derry City	?	(2)
2005–2010	Sligo Rovers	55	(8)
2011	Finn Harps	10	(0)
2012–2013	Ballinamallard United	26	(0)

International career
- Republic of Ireland U21
- * Club domestic league appearances and goals

Conor O'Grady (born 27 May 1980) is an Irish former footballer who last played for Ballinamallard United.

For his home town club he was sent off in a 2009–10 UEFA Europa League tie against Albanian side Vllaznia.

O'Grady represented his country at the UEFA U-19 Championship in Sweden in 1999 where he won a bronze medal.

In August 2012 he moved to IFA Premiership newcomers Ballinamallard United.
