= John Lester (footballer) =

Irish footballer

Personal information
- Full name: John Lester
- Date of birth: 5 August 1982 (age 44)
- Place of birth: Dublin, Ireland
- Position: Midfielder

Team information
- Current team: North End United

Youth career
- Leicester Celtic
- 1998–2001: Everton

Senior career*
Years	Team	Apps	(Gls)
2001–2003	Bohemians	8	(0)
2002–2003	→ Monaghan United (loan)	7	(2)
2004	Drogheda United	33	(3)
2005	Waterford United	16	(0)
2006	Limerick	27	(6)
2007–2008	Galway United	54	(2)
2009	St Patrick's Athletic	13	(1)
2010	Longford Town	30	(4)
2011	Drogheda United	5	(0)
2011–2017	Sheriff Y.C.		
2017	Greystones United		
2017–2019	Sheriff Y.C.		
2019–	North End United		

International career
1999	Republic of Ireland U17	2	(0)
2003	Republic of Ireland U21	1	(0)
- * Club domestic league appearances and goals

John Lester (born 5 August 1982) is an Irish footballer who plays for North End United in the Wexford Football League.

== Career ==
Lester played his schoolboy football at Leicester Celtic alongside the likes of Andy Reid, Barry Roche and Declan Field. His performances attracted cross-channel clubs and he played for West Ham United in the famous Northern Ireland Milk Cup winning the Player of the Tournament award. Despite this, he ended up signing professional terms with Everton. He began well and regularly played for the reserve team at the age of 16 but in his 2nd season, he broke his leg and missed the remainder of the year.

His time on Merseyside was never the same after the broken leg and he returned home to Dublin and signed for Pete Mahon's Bohemians, making his League of Ireland debut as a substitute against Galway United on 31 August 2001. He was loaned out to Monaghan making his debut at Shamrock Rovers on 3 February 2002.

Lester was called into the Republic of Ireland national under-21 football team panel for the first time in October 2002.

In January 2003 he was selected in the League of Ireland First Division Team of the Year.

Lester had a nomadic League of Ireland career with 9 different clubs before culminating with a brief stint at Drogheda United.

In 2011, Lester moved to Sheriff Y.C. in the AUL and enjoyed a trophy-laden 6 years with the club winning 25 trophies.

In July 2017, Lester moved to the Leinster Senior League to join Greystones United, however only two months later he returned to Sheriff Y.C.

He signed for North End United in August 2019.
