= Shane Guthrie =

Irish footballer (born 1984)

Personal information
- Full name: Shane Guthrie
- Date of birth: 11 December 1984 (age 41)
- Place of birth: Letterkenny, Ireland
- Position: Centre back

Youth career
- St Brendans Park Kingdom Boys
- Tralee Dynamos

Senior career*
Years	Team	Apps	(Gls)
2003–2006	Cork City	0	(0)
2005	→ Kilkenny City (loan)	18	(0)
2006	→ Shamrock Rovers (loan)	6	(2)
2007–2008	Cobh Ramblers	59	(2)
2009	Galway United	31	(0)
2010–2011	St Patrick's Athletic	31	(3)
2011	→ Dundalk (loan)	12	(1)
2012	Limerick	18	(2)
- Tralee Dynamos
2023	Kerry	7	(0)

International career
2008	Republic of Ireland U23	1	(0)
- * Club domestic league appearances and goals

Shane Guthrie (born 11 December 1984) is an Irish footballer who plays for Kerry in the League of Ireland First Division. He has played Gaelic football with Kerry and Munster club champions and All-Ireland semi-finalists Austin Stacks.

== Career ==
Guthrie was born in Donegal, Ireland. He played youth football in County Kerry with St Brendans Park, Kingdom Boys and Tralee Dynamos.

Guthrie signed for Cork City in 2003 having previously played for Kingdom Boys and Tralee Dynamos in Kerry. Shane made his senior team bow in the 2004 Munster Senior Cup.

Guthrie signed for Shamrock Rovers on loan in July 2006 and made a scoring debut at Cobh Ramblers on 15 July. Gutherie scored again against Kildare County before breaking his leg against Athlone Town thus ending his short Rovers career.

Guthrie signed for Cobh Ramblers in early 2007 and spent two seasons at the club making 59 appearances.

Shane then moved to Galway United for the 2009 season where he had a very impressive season making 31 appearances for the Tribesmen.

In 2023, Guthrie joined new League of Ireland First Division club Kerry F.C., for which his brother Wayne had previously signed.

=== Gaelic football ===
Shane was among the substitutes for Austin Stacks during their All-Ireland club Gaelic football semi final against Slaughtneil in 2015.

== Honours ==
St Patrick's Athletic

- Leinster Senior Cup (1): 2010-11

Limerick

- League of Ireland First Division (1): 2012
- Munster Senior Cup (1): 2011-12
