= 2011 Leinster Senior Cup =

Leinster Football Association Senior Cup

Tournament details
- Country: Ireland
- Teams: 43

Final positions
- Champions: St.Patrick's Athletic
- Runner-up: Bohemians

The 2011 Leinster Senior Cup, was the 110th staging of the Leinster Senior Cup association football competition. 43 teams entered the 2011 competition including the 11 League of Ireland teams affiliated to the Leinster Football Association who entered the competition at the Fourth round stage. A further 16 Intermediate teams, 14 Junior teams and 2 A Championship sides entered the competition at the First round stage. St.Patrick's Athletic won the competition after beating Bohemians 2-0 at Dalymount Park.

== Third round ==
The draw for the third round took place on 20 January 2011.

Tie no	Home team	Score	Away team	Report
1	Crumlin United	5 – 0	Arklow Town	
2	Tolka Rovers	0 – 4	Killester United	
3	Glebe North	0 – 1	Willow Park	
4	Crettyard United	3 – 1	Evergreen	

== Fourth round ==
The draw for the Fourth round took place on 20 January 2011.

Tie no	Home team	Score	Away team	Report
1	Willow Park	2 – 1	Crumlin United	Report
2	Dundalk	0 – 2	Shamrock Rovers	Report
3	Bray Wanderers	0 – 2	St. Patrick's Athletic	Report
4	Wexford Youths	1 – 0	Drogheda United	Report
5	Killester United	3 – 1	Longford Town	Report
6	Sporting Fingal	w/o^{1}	Bohemians	
7	Crettyard United	0 – 1	Shelbourne	Report
8	Athlone Town	2 – 1	UCD	Report

^Note 1 Bohemians advance to the quarter-final stage following Sporting Fingal ceasing operations on 10 February 2011

== Quarter-finals ==
The draw for the quarter-finals took place on 16 March 2011.

Tie no	Home team	Score	Away team	Report
1	St. Patrick's Athletic	3 – 0	Athlone Town	Report
2	Killester United	4 – 0	Willow Park	Report
3	Wexford Youths	0 – 6	Shelbourne	Report
4	Bohemians	2 - 1	Shamrock Rovers	Report

== Semi-finals ==
The Draw for the semi-finals took place on 11 July 2011

Tie no	Home team	Score	Away team	Report
1	St. Patrick's Athletic	4 - 0	Killester United	Report
2	Bohemians	2 - 0	Shelbourne	Report

== Final ==
Tie no	Home team	Score	Away team	Report
1	Bohemians	0 - 2	St.Patrick's Athletic	Report
