= Ross Gaynor =

Irish footballer

Personal information
- Full name: Ross Leon Gaynor
- Date of birth: 9 September 1987 (age 39)
- Place of birth: Ardee, County Louth, Ireland
- Positions: Left back; winger

Youth career
- Belvedere
- Millwall

Senior career*
Years	Team	Apps	(Gls)
2007–2008	Millwall	3	(0)
2007	→ Sutton United (loan)	?	(?)
2008	Cobh Ramblers	14	(8)
2009	Sporting Fingal	14	(6)
2009	→ Drogheda United (loan)	15	(3)
2010–2011	Dundalk	63	(12)
2012–2014	Sligo Rovers	64	(7)
2014–2015	Cork City	27	(5)
2016–2017	Linfield	37	(11)

International career
- Republic of Ireland U17
- Republic of Ireland U19
2007	Republic of Ireland U21	2	(2)
2010	Republic of Ireland U23	1	(0)
- * Club domestic league appearances and goals as of 21:30, 2 August 2015 (UTC)

Ross Leon Gaynor (born 9 September 1987) from Ardee, County Louth is an Irish professional footballer who played in the Football League for Millwall.

== Club career ==
Gaynor began his career playing juvenile football in Ardee with Square United and Ardee Celtic before moving on to Belvedere .

Gaynor played for the Dundalk Schoolboys League side. He opted to begin his career with Millwall. Gaynor later joined Sutton United on loan in 2007 but was released at the end of the 2007–08 season, subsequently joining Cobh Ramblers. Gaynor then signed for Sporting Fingal in December 2008 for the season, but joined Drogheda United on loan in July 2009. On 9 February 2010 he signed for Dundalk.

In December 2011, Gaynor signed for Sligo Rovers. Despite starting out on the wing he eventually settled into the left back position due to an injury to regular left back Iarfhlaith Davoren. He was an important part of the defence that secured a first league title in 35 years for Rovers while also providing several assists.

He made a good start to the 2013 season again in the left-back position and scored his first league goal for the club in the home win over Derry City. An injury towards the end of the year restricted his appearances but he added an FAI Cup winners' medal to his collection coming on as a sub in the 3–2 win against Drogheda in the final.

== International ==
At the age 18 he was capped by the Republic of Ireland under-21s, and scored twice on his debut. His second cap came against Portugal.

He scored on his debut for the Irish under 17s 19s and 21s. He was capped a number of times at under-23 level; the latest being on 26 May 2010 against England C.

== Honours ==
Sligo Rovers

- League of Ireland (1): 2012
- FAI Cup (1): 2013
- Setanta Sports Cup (1): 2014
