= Gareth Coughlan =

Irish footballer

Personal information
- Date of birth: 24 November 1989 (age 36)
- Place of birth: Dublin, Ireland
- Position: Winger

Youth career
- Lourdes Celtic

Senior career*
| Years | Team | Apps | (Gls) |
| 2008–2009 | Bray Wanderers | 26 | (1) |
| 2010–2011 | St Patrick's Athletic | 9 | (1) |
| 2011–2012 | Sacred Heart | | |
| 2012 | Dundalk | 7 | (0) |
| 2012–2013 | Sacred Heart | | |
| 2014–2016 | Shelbourne | 50 | (13) |
- * Club domestic league appearances and goals

Gareth Coughlan (born 24 November 1989) is an Irish footballer who last played for Shelbourne in the League of Ireland First Division.

Coughlan made his League of Ireland debut for Bray against Finn Harps in June 2008, and during his time at the Carlisle Grounds played alongside Derek Foran, Chris Shields and Shane O'Neill, who are all part of Seán McCaffrey's squad at Dundalk.

The Dubliner had joined the Seagulls from Lourdes Celtic.

Ahead of the 2010 season, Coughlan signed for St. Pat's. However, the following May, in front of Giovanni Trapattoni and Marco Tardelli he suffered a double fracture to his right leg while playing against Bohemians.

Coughlan signed for St Patrick's Athletic A Championship side for the 2011 season.

In September, he signed for Sacred Heart in the Leinster Senior League.

On 10 February, after training with the squad for three weeks, Coughlan signed a one-year deal with the Lilywhites which will see him spend the 2012 season at Oriel Park. He made his Dundalk debut as a substitute in a scoreless draw against Monaghan United at Gortakeegan on 2 March.
