= Matt Gregg (footballer) =

English footballer (born 1978)

Personal information
- Full name: Matthew Stephen Gregg
- Date of birth: 30 November 1978 (age 47)
- Place of birth: Cheltenham, England
- Height: 1.90 m (6 ft 3 in)
- Position: Goalkeeper

Senior career*
Years	Team	Apps	(Gls)
1995–1998	Torquay Utd	32	(0)
1998–2001	Crystal Palace	15	(0)
1999	→ Swansea City (loan)	5	(0)
2000	→ Exeter City (loan)	4	(0)
2001–2003	Bray Wanderers	36	(0)
2003–2006	Bohemians	51	(0)
2007–2008	UCD	47	(1)
2009	Bohemians	2	(0)
2010	Dundalk	5	(0)
2010–2011	Bray Wanderers	44	(0)
Total		241	(1)
- * Club domestic league appearances and goals

Matthew Stephen Gregg (born 30 November 1978) is an English retired professional footballer who played as a goalkeeper. He now runs a goalkeeper coaching school in Ireland.

== Playing career ==
Gregg played cricket for Gloucestershire up to under-16 level before deciding to concentrate on his football career.

He played for Gloucester Primary Schools alongside future Torquay United teammate Wayne Thomas. He began his senior career as an apprentice with Torquay United, making his debut while still aged only 16 in the 1–1 draw with Wigan Athletic on 16 September 1995. He then returned to the reserves and his apprenticeship, appearing once more, in the last match of the 1996–97 season away to Doncaster Rovers, before turning professional in July 1997. He played another 30 times for Torquay, including the 1997–98 play-off final due to regular keeper Ken Veysey being suspended, before moving to Crystal Palace in October 1998 for a fee of £400,000.

He joined Swansea City on loan in February 1999, before making his Palace debut in a 1–0 defeat against Fulham at Craven Cottage in April 2000. He struggled to win a place in the first team, and the arrival of Matt Clarke from Bradford City pushed Gregg further out of contention and on 14 September 2001 he joined Exeter City on loan.

=== Career in Ireland ===
He left Selhurst Park on 25 October 2001, joining Irish side Bray Wanderers on a free transfer.

Gregg impressed at Bray and earned a move in April 2003 to then champions, Bohemians. He spent four years at Dalymount Park where he established himself as first choice and making numerous European appearances and later moved to UCD for the 2007 season. He made his UCD debut in a 1–0 defeat to Sligo Rovers on 1 April 2007 and started his UCD career with five clean sheets in his first eight appearances. He traded places with Darren Quigley through the 2007 season and his performances became shaky as he faded to second choice by season's end. Gregg appeared to have rejoined Bray Wanderers for the 2008 season, but re-signed for UCD when Quigley left the club. He began the 2008 season as first choice keeper and firmly claimed the number one spot as his own with some vastly improved performances including a dramatic equalising injury time headed goal against Cobh Ramblers. In December 2008, he was short-listed for the Eircom/Soccer Writers Association of Ireland Goalkeeper of the Year award, but lost out to Bohemians keeper Brian Murphy.

With UCD relegated to Division One at the end of the 2008 season, Gregg rejoined Bohemians in January 2009. He was released in November 2009 after his contract expired. Gregg signed for Dundalk on 18 January 2010 to battle Peter Cherrie for the number one spot. Gregg's appearances for Dundalk were limited due to Cherrie's excellent form in goal. Gregg left Dundalk by mutual agreement on 24 June 2010, citing lack of first team football as the main reason for his departure.

Gregg moved back to Bray in July 2010 in time for the friendly against Spanish side Villarreal and was substituted on at half time. Bray lost 5–0 although Gregg put in a good performance.

His performances continued in this vein with Gregg being instrumental in turning around Bray's season and helping them overhaul a ten-point deficit at the bottom of the league to retain their Premier League status. Bray manager Pat Delvin hailed Gregg's professionalism in helping keep his team in the Premier Division. Gregg went on to play one more year for the Seagulls, helping them to a mid table finish. He then decided to hang up the Gloves (despite numerous offers) to concentrate on his Goalkeeper Coaching Career with Just4Keepers, where he has helped several young keepers achieve their dream of becoming professionals.

== Honours ==
Bohemians

- League of Ireland: 2009
- League of Ireland Cup: 2009
