= Wexford F.C. =

Association football club in Ireland

Wexford
- Full name: Wexford Football Club
- Nickname: Youths
- Founded: 6 February 2007; 19 years ago
- Ground: Ferrycarrig Park
- Capacity: 2,500 (609 temp seats)
- Owner: Wexford Supporters' Trust
- Manager: Stephen Elliott
- League: League of Ireland First Division
- 2026: League of Ireland First Division, 8th of 10
- Website: www.wexfordfc.ie
Home colours	Away colours

Wexford Football Club is an Irish association football club based in Crossabeg, County Wexford. They compete in the League of Ireland First Division. Under the name Wexford Youths, the club joined the league after being awarded a First Division licence for the 2007 League of Ireland season after Dublin City's bankruptcy. The club previously wore pink and black, before switching to Wexford's county colours of purple and gold in 2023. The club rebranded for the start of the 2017 season by dropping the 'Youths' from their title and changing the club crest.

== History ==
Chart of yearly table positions for Wexford in League of Ireland

=== Founding years ===
Wexford Youths were founded by developer and TD Mick Wallace, who has funded the construction of Ferrycarrig Park, a state-of-the-art complex for the new team at Crossabeg, near Wexford Town. Wallace managed the senior side for the first three seasons, as well as the under-21s, under-18s and under-16s. Before the start of the 2010 season, former Limerick FC manager and Wexford Youths assistant manager Noel O'Connor took the reins as manager of the senior squad. Pat Dolan acted as an advisor to Mick Wallace and while remaining on as Setanta Sports' anchorman for their live TV coverage of Irish domestic soccer.

Wexford Youths FC applied for a League of Ireland licence in December 2006, and were officially granted a First Division licence on 6 February 2007. The club has stated an intention to be a unique institution in Irish football in prioritising local players, and has only taken on players from the Wexford area.

Wexford Youths' first game was away to Monaghan United, on 9 March 2007, and ended in a 2–2 draw. The club's first scorer was Conor Sinnott. The first home match was on 18 March 2007, a 1–0 victory over Cobh Ramblers. Tom Elmes was the goal scorer. Wexford Youths first ever League of Ireland Cup fixture saw them play Waterford United at the RSC, Waterford. This game was the first competitive derby game for Wexford Youths against one of their local rivals, and saw Wexford beaten 3–0. The club's FAI Cup début arrived on 15 June 2007 with a trip to Jackman Park to face fellow league newcomers Limerick 37. The game produced a 1–1 draw and sent the tie to a replay, with Limerick 37 winning the replay 1–0.

Wexford Youths finished their first season in ninth place (out of ten) in the league, five points clear of bottom club Kilkenny City.

On 25 August 2008, the Youths achieved a famous victory in the League Cup semifinal, beating Cork City 1–0 at Turners Cross. However they lost out 6–1 to Derry City in the final at Ferrycarrig Park.

Wexford Youths finished the 2008 season in seventh place. The Youths rose a place in the 2009 season, finishing 6th out of an expanded 12 teams

Wexford Youths hosted Wolverhampton Wanderers on November 2nd 2009, which saw a homecoming for Wexford native Kevin Doyle. Wolves won 2-1 however it was notable that such a young club had a home fixture vs an English Premier League side.

Before the beginning of the 2010 season, the Youths' captain, crowd favourite and record goal-scorer Conor Sinnott transferred to St. Patrick's Athletic. Nevertheless, the club had some good fortune. During the 2010 season the Youths recorded their first ever home win over local rivals Waterford United, and followed this up with an away win against Shelbourne. More players parted ways with the Youths during the 2010 season, including record appearance holder Paul "Patsi" Malone, and the highly experienced defender David Breen. Both are former Supporters Player of the Year winners, in 2007 and 2009 respectively. The Youths had yet another very memorable night soon after their departure, when they enjoyed a 5–3 victory in the league over their tense rivals Limerick. Jimmy Keohane, Dean Broaders and Shane Dempsey scored for the Youths, before Limerick's Jeffrey Judge and former Youths player Peter White were both sent off for Limerick. To ascertain the victor, Limerick veteran Gary Sheahan scored the fifth goal for the Youths, to rapturous celebrations from the supporters at Ferrycarrig Park. July ended with the transfer of central midfielder Jimmy Keohane to Bristol City. The Youths once again scored 5 in a 5–2 away win at Mervue United, equalling their highest ever winning margin. Despite their high scoring season, they finished the first division in 7th place, just behind Cork City on 42 points.

Paul "Patsi" Malone returned to the Youths for the 2011 season, and later in the season Shane Dempsey returned to the club after a spell at Waterford United F.C. However, record goalscorer Garry Sheahan returned to Limerick F.C. The season yielded the Youths their worst points haul yet of 14, finishing second-last ahead of Salthill Devon due to a 5–2 home win against them on the very last day of the season, their only home league win in 2011. The year did produce one very notable result in favour of the Youths, a 4–1 home win against Derry City in the FAI Cup

In December 2011, Noel O'Connor ended his management of the club, replaced by former F.C. Carlow manager Shane Keegan. The club began the 2012 season with a record-shattering 6–0 win over their local rivals Waterford United F.C. After a mildly successful 2012 season in which the club finished fourth out of eight teams with 39 points, the club lost Paul "Patsi" Malone to Bray Wanderers and all-time top-scorer Danny Furlong to Cork City for the start of the 2013 season.

In 2015 under Shane Keegan's management, the Youths won the First Division and promotion to the League of Ireland Premier Division for the first time in their history.

The following season was a poor one for Wexford Youths. They lost 22 and won just 6 of their 33 league games. They finished 11th in the 2016 League of Ireland Premier Division and were beaten 3–2 on aggregate in the relegation play-offs by Drogheda United, to be relegated straight back to the League of Ireland First Division. At the end of the season, Manager Shane Keegan left the club to take up the Galway United job, vacated by Tommy Dunne. Damian Locke was appointed as the new manager of Wexford in November 2016.

=== Reborn as Wexford FC ===
In September 2017, the club announced that Wexford Supporters' Trust, a supporter's co-op, were to take ownership of the club. The club finished their first season under the new name in 7th place in the First Division. After poor results Locke was let go by the club in 2018, with Brian O'Sullivan appointed as the new manager for the 2019 season. In the latter half of the season, centre back Darragh O'Connor made a transfer to Premier League side Leicester City FC.

In May 2021, Brian O'Sullivan departed as manager by mutual consent after 7 defeats from the first 7 games of the season.

Ian Ryan was appointed as the new senior team manager in May 2021. Ryan had an immediate impact at the club, bringing Wexford to the FAI Cup quarter final and late season wins over UCD, Bray Wanderers, Athlone Town, Cobh Ramblers and Cabinteely. Wexford finished third in the table based on the final series of games, boding well for the following year.

Wexford made their best ever start to a season in 2022, with two wins in their opening three games against Cobh Ramblers and Athlone Town. Wexford continued to challenge for the playoff places, with a memorable win over Longford Town thanks to goals from Luka Lovic and Conor Barry.

The club announced a major restructuring plan late in 2022 with the appointment of Tony Doyle as new CEO of the club. They picked up another historic result soon after, defeating Premier Division side Sligo Rovers in the FAI Cup.

Wexford ended the season in 6th position, failing to reach the playoffs but a noted improvement on previous seasons. Manager Ian Ryan unexpectedly announced his resignation after the end of the season.

James Keddy was named as Ian Ryan's replacement as manager on 17 November 2022. After a strong performance in the second half of the 2023 season, Wexford secured their first ever playoff finish in the First Division with a fourth-place finish. In the playoff semi-final, Wexford agonisingly lost to Cobh 2–1 on aggregate after a late Cobh equaliser at St. Colman's Park sent them through to play Waterford.

In November 2023, the club announced plans to move to a new 6000 seater stadium in Wexford Town. In June 2023, they announced a full amalgamation with the women's side of the club would be complete by 2024. At the end of the season, it was confirmed that manager James Keddy had departed the club.

On 26 November 2024, the club announced the appointment of former Ireland international Stephen Elliott as the new men's first team manager to replace James Keddy.

In his first year in charge, Elliott narrowly missed on a playoff place after a final day decider with Treaty United, finishing in seventh place.

== Colours and badge ==
As Wexford Youths, the club wore a home kit of all pink and an away kit of all black.

The original badge featured the club motto 'Play the beautiful game' and the words 'Life's short, work hard, play hard', a motto used by Wallace Construction for many years, having previously been placed on the kits of Cork City when Wallace sponsored that club. The five stars above the badge represented the four under 18 FAI inter-league titles and one FAI Youth Cup won by Wexford teams managed by Wallace. The club crest was then changed to an image of a rampant bull. Mick Wallace decided to change the crest to pay homage to his favourite Italian club, Torino.

In December 2022, Wexford underwent another logo change, opting to use the traditional GAA colours of purple and yellow. The new logo consists of a purple background with three pikes in reference to the 1798 Rebellion in the shape of a W, with a football on both the far left and far right of the logo adjacent to the left-most and right-most pikes.

== Stadium ==
Wexford play at Ferrycarrig Park. It has a current seated capacity of just over 600 but plans are in place to extend this to over 2000.

A new, state-of-the-art, 6,000 capacity football stadium situated right in Wexford town, located near Min Ryan Park in the town itself was announced in September 2024 at a media launch with club official, local government officials at Ferrycarrig Park

== Records ==
=== Most appearances for Wexford FC ===
#	Name	Career	Appearances
1	(Republic of Ireland) Danny Furlong	2007–2016, 2019, 2023	272
2	(Republic of Ireland) Patsy Malone	2007–2013	173
3	(Republic of Ireland) Graham Doyle	2012–2017	172
4	(Republic of Ireland) Aaron Dobbs	2018-2025	162
5	(Republic of Ireland) Anthony Russell	2007–2011	148

=== Most goals scored for Wexford FC ===
#	Name	Career	Goals
1	(Republic of Ireland) Danny Furlong	2007-2016, 2019, 2023	119
2	(Republic of Ireland) Aaron Dobbs	2018-2025	45
3	(Republic of Ireland) Mikie Rowe	2024–	42
4	(Republic of Ireland) Eric Molloy	2012–2016	23
5	(Republic of Ireland) Thomas Oluwa	2023-2024	22

=== Wexford FC Supporters' Player of the Year ===
Season	Winner
2023	(Republic of Ireland) Reece Webb
2022	Not held
2021	(Republic of Ireland) Kevin McEvoy
2020	(Republic of Ireland) Tom Murphy
2019	(Republic of Ireland) Paddy Cahill
2018	(Republic of Ireland) Conor Sutton
2015	(Republic of Ireland) Danny Furlong
2014	(Republic of Ireland) Graham Doyle
2011	(Republic of Ireland) Martin Kehoe
2010	(Republic of Ireland) Packie Holden
2009	(Republic of Ireland) David Breen
2008	(Republic of Ireland) Anthony Russell
2007	(Republic of Ireland) Paul Malone

=== Club records ===
- Biggest home victory – 7–0 vs. Cabinteely – 24 April 2015 and vs Athlone Town – 20 April 2018
- Biggest away victory – 0–6 vs. Kerry FC – 26 May 2023
- Biggest defeat – 0–8 vs. UCD (h) – 7 May 2018 & 8–0 vs. UCD (a) – 4 September 2020.
- Biggest Attendance – 3,000 vs. Derry City – EA Sports Cup Final 27 September 2008
- Biggest League Attendance – 2,100 vs. Cobh Ramblers. – 18 March 2007
- Biggest Women's Attendance – 2,201 vs. Bohemians. – 31 August 2025
- Most points in a season – 61 in 2015

== Current squad ==
Note: Flags indicate national team as defined under FIFA eligibility rules; some limited exceptions apply. Players may hold more than one non-FIFA nationality.

No.	Pos.	Nation	Player
1	GK	IRL	Alex Moody
2	DF	IRL	Max Murphy
3	DF	IRL	Evan Osam
4	MF	IRL	Adam Verdon
5	DF	IRL	Robbie McCourt
7	FW	IRL	Mikie Rowe
8	MF	IRL	Zayd Abada
10	MF	IRL	Kaylem Harnett
11	MF	IRL	Jamie Wynne
14	MF	IRL	Liam Doyle

No.	Pos.	Nation	Player
17	MF	IRL	Gideon Tetteh
19	MF	IRL	Gavin Hodgins
20	GK	IRL	Paul Martin
22	MF	IRL	Billy Vance
23	FW	IRL	Kyal Byrne
25	DF	IRL	Ryan Butler
26	DF	IRL	Kian Dignam
33	FW	IRL	Jake Doyle

== Club Officials ==
Position	Staff
CEO	Tony Doyle
Head of Football	John Godkin
Academy Director	Tom Elmes
Manager	Stephen Elliott
Assistant Manager	John Behan
Goalkeeper Coach	Pa Doyle
Doctor	Ravi Kumar

== Honours ==
Men's

- League of Ireland First Division
  - Winners: 2015
- League of Ireland Cup
  - Runners-up: 2008
- FAI Youth Cup
  - Winners: 2008, 2012
- Leinster Senior Cup
  - Runners-up: 2016

Women's

- Women's National League
  - Winners: 2014–15, 2015–16, 2017, 2018
- FAI Women's Cup
  - Winners: 2015, 2018, 2019, 2021
- WNL Cup
  - Winners: 2013–14
- WNL Shield
  - Winners: 2015–16
- All-Island Cup
  - Winners: 2025 1

== See also ==
- Wexford F.C. Women
