= List of St Patrick's Athletic F.C. players =

St Patrick's Athletic
- Full name: St Patrick’s Athletic Football Club
- Nicknames: Pats, St Pats, The Saints
- Founded: 1929
- Ground: Richmond Park, Inchicore, Dublin 8
- Capacity: 5,340 (2,800 seated)
- League: League of Ireland Premier Division

St Patrick's Athletic F.C. (Irish: Cumann Peile Lúthchleas Phádraig Naofa) is an Irish association football club based in Inchicore, Dublin. Below is an incomplete list of all players to have made a competitive appearance for the club.

== A ==
- (Republic of Ireland) James Abankwah
- (Republic of Ireland) Eric Abudiore
- (England) Chris Adamson
- (Ghana) Joseph Anang
- (Republic of Ireland) Vinny Arkins
- (England) Chris Armstrong
- (Finland) Serge Atakayi

== B ==
- (Northern Ireland) Barry Baggley
- (Netherlands) Jordi Balk
- (England) Gordon Banks
- (England) Keith Barker
- (Republic of Ireland) Michael Barker
- (Republic of Ireland) Paddy Barrett
- (Republic of Ireland) Rhys Bartley
- (Republic of Ireland) Jack Bayly
- (Republic of Ireland) Martin Bayly
- (Republic of Ireland) David Bell
- (Scotland) Chris Bennion
- (Republic of Ireland) Robbie Benson
- (Republic of Ireland) Ian Bermingham
- (Poland) Jarosław Białek
- (Wales) Tony Bird
- (Australia) Con Blatsis
- (Republic of Ireland) Aaron Bolger
- (Republic of Ireland) Greg Bolger
- (England) Sam Bone
- (Republic of Ireland) Gavin Boyne
- (Republic of Ireland) Synan Braddish
- (Republic of Ireland) Stephen Bradley
- (Republic of Ireland) Austin Brady
- (Republic of Ireland) Ray Brady
- (England) Leon Braithwaite
- (Republic of Ireland) Lee Brandon
- (Republic of Ireland) Gino Brazil
- (Republic of Ireland) Killian Brennan
- (Republic of Ireland) Ryan Brennan
- (Republic of Ireland) Stephen Brennan
- (Republic of Ireland) Anthony Breslin
- (England) Barry Bridges
- (England) Harry Brockbank
- (United States) Nicky Broujos
- (Republic of Ireland) Bobby Browne
- (Republic of Ireland) Kenny Browne
- (Republic of Ireland) Liam Buckley
- (Republic of Ireland) Willie Burke
- (England) Jack Burkett
- (Republic of Ireland) Darragh Burns
- (Republic of Ireland) Conan Byrne
- (Republic of Ireland) Damien Byrne
- (Republic of Ireland) David Byrne
- (Republic of Ireland) Des Byrne
- (Republic of Ireland) Gareth Byrne
- (Republic of Ireland) Jason Byrne
- (Republic of Ireland) James Byrne
- (Republic of Ireland) Jody Byrne
- (Republic of Ireland) John Byrne
- (Republic of Ireland) Kurtis Byrne
- (Republic of Ireland) Neill Byrne
- (Republic of Ireland) Paul Byrne (born 1972)
- (Republic of Ireland) Paul Byrne (born 1986)
- (New Zealand) Sean Byrne
- (Republic of Ireland) Stuart Byrne
- (Republic of Ireland) Thomas Byrne

== C ==
- (Republic of Ireland) Stephen Caffrey
- (Republic of Ireland) Aaron Callaghan
- (Republic of Ireland) Dave Campbell
- (Republic of Ireland) Daniel Campbell
- (Republic of Ireland) Noel Campbell
- (Republic of Ireland) Paul Campbell
- (France) Achille Campion
- (Republic of Ireland) Billy Canny
- (Republic of Ireland) Jake Carroll
- (Republic of Ireland) Joe Carroll-Byrne
- (Republic of Ireland) Keith Carter
- (Republic of Ireland) Conor Carty
- (Scotland) Mark Casey
- (Republic of Ireland) Ryan Casey
- (Republic of Ireland) Brian Cash
- (Republic of Ireland) Alan Cawley
- (Republic of Ireland) David Cawley
- (Republic of Ireland) James Chambers
- (Romania) Marco Chindea
- (Republic of Ireland) Brendan Clarke
- (Republic of Ireland) Dean Clarke
- (Canada) Jeff Clarke
- (Republic of Ireland) Paul Cleary
- (Republic of Ireland) Conor Clifford
- (Republic of Ireland) Cian Coleman
- (Republic of Ireland) Jimmy Collins
- (Scotland) James Coll
- (Scotland) John Colrain
- (Republic of Ireland) Dan Connor
- (Republic of Ireland) Peter Conway
- (Republic of Ireland) Mick Cooke
- (Republic of Ireland) Ryan Coombes
- (Republic of Ireland) Kian Corbally
- (Republic of Ireland) Dinny Corcoran
- (Republic of Ireland) Kevin Cornwall
- (Republic of Ireland) Anthony Costigan
- (Republic of Ireland) Barry Cotter
- (Republic of Ireland) Gareth Coughlan
- (Republic of Ireland) Ronan Coughlan
- (Republic of Ireland) Fergus Crawford
- (Republic of Ireland) Patrick Cregg
- (Republic of Ireland) Trevor Croly
- (Republic of Ireland) Paul Crowley
- (Republic of Ireland) George Cummins
- (Republic of Ireland) Luke Cullen
- (Republic of Ireland) Sam Curtis

== D ==
- (Republic of Ireland) Ian Daly
- (Republic of Ireland) Adam Deans
- (Republic of Ireland) Clive Delaney
- (Republic of Ireland) Gary Dempsey
- (Republic of Ireland) Kevin Dempsey
- (Republic of Ireland) Billy Dennehy
- (Republic of Ireland) Darren Dennehy
- (Republic of Ireland) Lee Desmond
- (Republic of Ireland) Robbie Devereux
- (Republic of Ireland) Blake Devereux Lynch
- (Republic of Ireland) Féilim Dikčius
- (Republic of Ireland) Daniel Dobbin
- (Republic of Ireland) Anthony Dodd
- (Republic of Ireland) Pat Dolan
- (Republic of Ireland) Paul Donnelly
- (Republic of Ireland) James Doona
- (Republic of Ireland) Cian Doyle
- (Republic of Ireland) Derek Doyle
- (Republic of Ireland) Eoin Doyle
- (Republic of Ireland) Keith Doyle
- (Republic of Ireland) Kevin Doyle
- (Republic of Ireland) Mark Doyle
- (Republic of Ireland) Robbie Doyle
- (Republic of Ireland) Mikey Drennan
- (Republic of Ireland) Brian Dunne
- (Republic of Ireland) Darragh Dunne
- (Republic of Ireland) Jimmy Dunne
- (Republic of Ireland) Keith Dunne
- (Republic of Ireland) Robbie Dunne
- (Republic of Ireland) Stephen Dunne
- (Republic of Ireland) Tommy Dunne
- (Republic of Ireland) Peter Durrad

== E ==
- (England) Ryan Edmondson
- (Republic of Ireland) Zack Elbouzedi
- (Niger) Karim El-Khebir

== F ==
- (Republic of Ireland) Christy Fagan
- (Republic of Ireland) Dave Fagan
- (Republic of Ireland) Vinny Faherty
- (Republic of Ireland) Keith Fahey
- (Canada) Tyson Farago
- (Republic of Ireland) Kevin Farragher
- (Republic of Ireland) Rory Feely
- (Republic of Ireland) Pat Fenlon
- (Republic of Ireland) Padraig Finnerty
- (Republic of Ireland) Lorcan Fitzgerald
- (Republic of Ireland) Glen Fitzpatrick
- (Republic of Ireland) Luke Fitzpatrick
- (Republic of Ireland) Leo Flanagan
- (Republic of Ireland) Curtis Fleming
- (Republic of Ireland) Anthony Flood
- (Republic of Ireland) John Flood
- (Republic of Ireland) Pat Flynn
- (Republic of Ireland) Jason Folarin Oyenuga
- (Republic of Ireland) Colm Foley
- (Republic of Ireland) Michael Foley
- (Republic of Ireland) Derek Foran
- (Republic of Ireland) Richie Foran
- (Republic of Ireland) Chris Forrester
- (Republic of Ireland) Keith Foy
- (Republic of Ireland) David Freeman
- (Scotland) Kieran Freeman
- (Latvia) Gints Freimanis
- (United States) Lance Friesz
- (Republic of Ireland) John Frost

== G ==
- (Republic of Ireland) Robbie Gaffney
- (Republic of Ireland) Sean Gannon
- (England) Martin Garratt
- (Jamaica) Jordon Garrick
- (Republic of Ireland) Graham Gartland
- (Republic of Ireland) Owen Garvan
- (Scotland) Stuart Gauld
- (Republic of Ireland) Jason Gavin
- (Republic of Ireland) Tommy Gaynor
- (Republic of Ireland) Liam George
- (Republic of Ireland) Shay Gibbons
- (Scotland) Billy Gibson
- (England) Jordan Gibson
- (Republic of Ireland) Rene Gilmartin
- (Scotland) Ian Gilzean
- (Republic of Ireland) John Glynn
- (Republic of Ireland) Eddie Gormley
- (Republic of Ireland) Jamie Gray
- (Republic of Ireland) Aaron Greene
- (Republic of Ireland) Eamonn Gregg
- (Republic of Ireland) Shane Griffin
- (England) Tom Grivosti
- (Republic of Ireland) Kevin Grogan
- (Republic of Ireland) Steven Grogan
- (Togo) Cyril Guedjé
- (Republic of Ireland) Shane Guthrie
- (Guam) Ryan Guy

== H ==
- (Republic of Ireland) Alfie Hale
- (Republic of Ireland) Ronan Hale
- (Republic of Ireland) Ben Hannigan
- (Republic of Ireland) Andy Haran
- (Republic of Ireland) Neil Harney
- (England) Allan Harris
- (Wales) Jamie Harris
- (England) Jimmy Harris
- (Republic of Ireland) Evan Harte
- (Republic of Ireland) Joe Haverty
- (Republic of Ireland) Noel Haverty
- (Republic of Ireland) Billy Hayes
- (Republic of Ireland) Colin Hawkins
- (Republic of Ireland) Luke Heeney
- (Republic of Ireland) Dave Henderson
- (Republic of Ireland) Jackie Hennessy
- (England) Jak Hickman
- (Republic of Ireland) Fran Hitchcock
- (Republic of Ireland) Seán Hoare
- (Republic of Ireland) Matt Holland
- (Republic of Ireland) Brandon Holt
- (England) Michael Holt
- (Republic of Ireland) Peter Hopkins
- (Republic of Ireland) Robbie Horgan
- (Republic of Ireland) Cian Hughes
- (Republic of Ireland) Philip Hughes
- (England) Paul Hunt
- (Republic of Ireland) Eoin Hyland

== I ==
- (Equatorial Guinea) Baba Issaka

== J ==
- (Republic of Ireland) Jackie Jameson
- (Czech Republic) Vítězslav Jaroš
- (England) Pat Jennings
- (England) Jimmi-Lee Jones

== K ==
- (Republic of Ireland) Conor Kane
- (Republic of Ireland) Dare Kareem
- (Republic of Ireland) Brandon Kavanagh
- (Republic of Ireland) Cian Kavanagh
- (Republic of Ireland) Daryl Kavanagh
- (England) Al-Amin Kazeem
- (Republic of Ireland) Michael Keane
- (Republic of Ireland) Mick Kearin
- (Republic of Ireland) Conor Kearns
- (Republic of Ireland) Ruairí Keating
- (United States) Jake Keegan
- (Republic of Ireland) Jordan Keegan
- (Republic of Ireland) Paul Keegan
- (Republic of Ireland) Conor Keeley
- (Republic of Ireland) Josh Keeley
- (Republic of Ireland) Dermot Keely
- (Republic of Ireland) Aidan Keena
- (Republic of Ireland) Pat Kelch
- (Republic of Ireland) Cian Kelly
- (Republic of Ireland) Ciaran Kelly
- (Republic of Ireland) Dean Kelly
- (Republic of Ireland) Georgie Kelly
- (Republic of Ireland) Graham Kelly
- (Republic of Ireland) Jake Kelly
- (Republic of Ireland) Liam Kelly
- (Republic of Ireland) Seamus Kelly
- (Republic of Ireland) Tommy Kelly
- (Republic of Ireland) Conor Kenna
- (Republic of Ireland) Stephen Kenny
- (Republic of Ireland) Shay Keogh
- (Republic of Ireland) Jonathan Kehir
- (Republic of Ireland) Luke Kehir
- (Republic of Ireland) Kimson Kibaga
- (Republic of Ireland) Ciarán Kilduff
- (Scotland) Billy King
- (Republic of Ireland) Steven Kinsella
- (Republic of Ireland) Alan Kirby
- (Burundi) Aime Kitenge
- (Republic of Ireland) Paul Knight
- (Scotland) Mike Korotkich
- (Estonia) Vladislav Kreida

== L ==
- (United States) Morgan Langley
- (Republic of Ireland) Niall Lanigan
- (Norway) Glen Atle Larsen
- (Republic of Ireland) Joe Lawless
- (Republic of Ireland) Michael Leahy
- (England) Trevor Lee
- (Republic of Ireland) Mark Leech
- (Republic of Ireland) Mick Leech
- (England) Brenton Leister
- (Republic of Ireland) Harry Leonard
- (Republic of Ireland) Jamie Lennon
- (Republic of Ireland) John Lester
- (England) Alfie Lewis
- (Netherlands) Noah Lewis
- (Republic of Ireland) Darius Lipsiuc
- (Republic of Ireland) Tommy Lonergan
- (Republic of Ireland) Keith Long
- (Republic of Ireland) Dinny Lowry
- (Republic of Ireland) Jonathan Lunney
- (Republic of Ireland) Damian Lynch
- (Republic of Ireland) Eamonn Lynch
- (Republic of Ireland) Lee Lynch
- (Republic of Ireland) Packie Lynch
- (England) Dean Lyness

== M ==
- (Czech Republic) Michal Macek
- (Republic of Ireland) Sean Madden
- (Republic of Ireland) Simon Madden
- (Republic of Ireland) Darragh Maguire
- (Republic of Ireland) Anthony Maher
- (Republic of Ireland) Brian Maher
- (Republic of Ireland) Ian Maher
- (Republic of Ireland) Stephen Maher
- (Republic of Ireland) Conor Mahoney
- (Republic of Ireland) Ian Malone
- (Republic of Ireland) Joe Manley
- (Republic of Ireland) Brendan Markey
- (Republic of Ireland) Darragh Markey
- (England) Paul Marney
- (Scotland) Neil Martin
- (Brazil) Hernany Macedo Marques
- (Uganda) Charles Livingstone Mbabazi
- (Republic of Ireland) David McAllister
- (Scotland) Rhys McCabe
- (Republic of Ireland) Jason McClelland
- (Republic of Ireland) Ger McCarthy
- (Republic of Ireland) Gerry McCord
- (Republic of Ireland) Ben McCormack
- (Republic of Ireland) Conor McCormack
- (Republic of Ireland) John McDonnell
- (Republic of Ireland) Shane McEleney
- (Republic of Ireland) Christy McElligott
- (Republic of Ireland) Shane McFaul
- (Republic of Ireland) Paul McGee
- (Republic of Ireland) Johnny McGeehan
- (Republic of Ireland) Dylan McGlade
- (Republic of Ireland) Brian McGovern
- (Republic of Ireland) Jamie McGrath
- (Republic of Ireland) Jay McGrath
- (Republic of Ireland) Paul McGrath
- (Republic of Ireland) Dara McGuinness
- (Republic of Ireland) Jason McGuinness
- (Republic of Ireland) Stephen McGuinness
- (Republic of Ireland) Dan McHale
- (Republic of Ireland) Sean McHale
- (Republic of Ireland) Brian McKenna
- (Republic of Ireland) David McMillan
- (Republic of Ireland) Evan McMillan
- (Republic of Ireland) Luke McNally
- (Scotland) Gary McPhee
- (Northern Ireland) Darren Meenan
- (Republic of Ireland) Mason Melia
- (Saint Lucia) Nahum Melvin-Lambert
- (France) Laurent Merlin
- (Republic of Ireland) Brandon Miele
- (Liberia) George Miller
- (Republic of Ireland) Sean Molloy
- (Republic of Ireland) Trevor Molloy
- (Republic of Ireland) Mick Moody
- (Hong Kong) John Moore
- (Republic of Ireland) Kyle Moran
- (Republic of Ireland) Thomas Morgan
- (Republic of Ireland) Ian Morris
- (Republic of Ireland) Brian Morrisroe
- (Republic of Ireland) John Mountney
- (Republic of Ireland) David Mulcahy
- (Republic of Ireland) Jake Mulraney
- (Republic of Ireland) Mark Mulraney
- (Republic of Ireland) Tom Mulroney
- (Republic of Ireland) Adam Murphy
- (Republic of Ireland) Anthony Murphy
- (Republic of Ireland) Barry Murphy (born 1959)
- (Republic of Ireland) Barry Murphy (born 1985)
- (Republic of Ireland) Conor Murphy
- (England) John Murphy
- (Nigeria) Tzee Mustapha

== N ==
- (Cameroon) Joseph N'Do
- (Republic of Ireland) Paul Newe
- (Brazil) Paolo Nicomedes
- (Republic of Ireland) Alex Nolan
- (Republic of Ireland) Michael Noonan
- (Canada) David Norman Jr.
- (England) Danny North
- (Republic of Ireland) Darragh Nugent
- (Republic of Ireland) Martin Nugent
- (Malta) Kyrian Nwoko

== O ==
- (Republic of Ireland) Declan O'Brien
- (Republic of Ireland) Derek O'Brien
- (Republic of Ireland) Ger O'Brien
- (Republic of Ireland) Luke O'Brien
- (Republic of Ireland) James O'Brien
- (Republic of Ireland) Gay O'Carroll
- (Republic of Ireland) Joe O'Cearuill
- (Republic of Ireland) Adam O'Connor
- (Republic of Ireland) David O'Connor
- (Republic of Ireland) Garreth O'Connor
- (Republic of Ireland) John O'Connor
- (Republic of Ireland) Josh O'Connor
- (Republic of Ireland) Sean O'Connor
- (Republic of Ireland) Tony O'Connor
- (Republic of Ireland) Paul O'Conor
- (Republic of Ireland) Tony O'Dowd
- (Republic of Ireland) David Odumosu
- (Republic of Ireland) Richie O'Farrell
- (Republic of Ireland) Ricky O'Flaherty
- (Republic of Ireland) Stephen O'Flynn
- (Republic of Ireland) Sammy Ogungbe
- (Republic of Ireland) Alex O'Hanlon
- (Republic of Ireland) Josh O'Hanlon
- (Republic of Ireland) Matthew O'Hara
- (Republic of Ireland) Aidan O'Keeffe
- (Republic of Ireland) Eamonn O'Keefe
- (Republic of Ireland) Darren O'Keeffe
- (Republic of Ireland) Conor O'Malley
- (Finland) Anthony Olusanya
- (Republic of Ireland) Ken Oman
- (Republic of Ireland) Frank O'Neill
- (Republic of Ireland) Gary O'Neill
- (Republic of Ireland) Adam O'Reilly
- (Republic of Ireland) Kevin O'Reilly
- (Republic of Ireland) Paul Osam
- (Republic of Ireland) Ben O'Sullivan
- (Belgium) Tunde Owolabi

== P ==
- (Republic of Ireland) Stephen Paisley
- (England) Romal Palmer
- (Republic of Ireland) David Parkes
- (Wales) David Partridge
- (Republic of Ireland) Gavin Peers
- (Republic of Ireland) Derek Pender
- (Republic of Ireland) Conor Pepper
- (England) Arran Pettifer
- (Brazil) Marcelo Pitaluga
- (England) Derek Possee
- (Republic of Ireland) Simon Power
- (Republic of Ireland) Georgie Poynton
- (Republic of Ireland) Barry Prenderville
- (Republic of Ireland) Aidan Price

== Q ==
- (Republic of Ireland) Kian Quigley
- (Republic of Ireland) Mark Quigley
- (Republic of Ireland) Stephen Quigley
- (Republic of Ireland) Ciaran Quinn
- (Republic of Ireland) Gerry Quinn
- (Republic of Ireland) Stephen Quinn

== R ==
- (Republic of Ireland) Joe Redmond
- (Scotland) Martin Rennie
- (Republic of Ireland) Alan Reilly
- (Republic of Ireland) Martin Reilly
- (Northern Ireland) Darren Robinson
- (Republic of Ireland) Kyle Robinson
- (Republic of Ireland) Lee Roche
- (Republic of Ireland) Danny Rogers
- (England) Dave Rogers
- (Republic of Ireland) Gary Rogers
- (Republic of Ireland) Fran Rooney
- (Republic of Ireland) Mark Rooney
- (Republic of Ireland) Paul Rooney
- (Republic of Ireland) Sam Rooney
- (Republic of Ireland) Paul Rose
- (Republic of Ireland) Mark Rossiter
- (Republic of Ireland) Ger Rowe
- (Republic of Ireland) John Russell
- (Republic of Ireland) Martin Russell
- (England) Mark Rutherford
- (Republic of Ireland) Barry Ryan
- (Republic of Ireland) Bobby Ryan
- (England) Darragh Ryan
- (Republic of Ireland) David Ryan
- (Republic of Ireland) John Ryan

== S ==
- (Brazil) Luís Gabriel Sacilotto
- (Northern Ireland) Jack Scott
- (England) Anthony Shandran
- (Republic of Ireland) Gary Shaw
- (Republic of Ireland) Philip Sheppard
- (Republic of Ireland) Ryan Sheridan
- (Republic of Ireland) Brian Shortall
- (Republic of Ireland) Conor Sinnott
- (Sweden) Axel Sjöberg
- (Poland) Łukasz Skowron
- (Scotland) Matty Smith
- (Ivory Coast) Yssouf Soro
- (Republic of Ireland) Jason Spelman
- (Scotland) Alec Stephenson
- (Republic of Ireland) Enda Stevens
- (Republic of Ireland) Sam Steward
- (Republic of Ireland) Sean Stewart
- (Republic of Ireland) Freddie Strahan
- (Republic of Ireland) Fuad Sule
- (Republic of Ireland) Niall Sullivan

== T ==
- (England) Alfie Taylor
- (Republic of Ireland) Mark Timlin
- (Netherlands) Thijs Timmermans
- (Latvia) David Titov
- (Republic of Ireland) Kevin Toner
- (Northern Ireland) Danny Trainor
- (Republic of Ireland) Keith Treacy
- (Republic of Ireland) Paddy Turley
- (Republic of Ireland) Ian Turner
- (Republic of Ireland) Luke Turner

== V ==
- (England) Terry Venables
- (Republic of Ireland) Sam Verdon

== W ==
- (Republic of Ireland) Jake Walker
- (England) Dan Ward
- (Republic of Ireland) David Webster
- (Republic of Ireland) Jamie Whelan
- (Republic of Ireland) Ronnie Whelan
- (Scotland) Alex Williams
- (Northern Ireland) Trevor Wood
- (Belgium) Dominique Wouters

== Y ==
- (England) Ollie Younger
