= 2007 Shelbourne F.C. season =

Shelbourne
2007 season
- Chairman: Joe Casey
- Manager: Dermot Keely
- First Division: 5th
- FAI Cup: Second Round
- League Cup: Second Round
- Top goalscorer: League: Mark Leech (12); All: Mark Leech (12)
- Highest home attendance: 1,896 vs Dundalk (23 March 2007)
- Lowest home attendance: 549 vs Finn Harps (12 August 2007)
Home colours	Away colours

In the 2007 season, Shelbourne finished 5th in the League of Ireland First Division.

== Overview ==
After financial problems during the 2006 Shelbourne F.C. season the club was left with just two senior players by January 2007, and the club withdrew from the Setanta Cup. The financial problems began to threaten participation in the Champions' League for 2007. Shelbourne's woes were deepened on 25 January 2007 when owner and general manager, Ollie Byrne, was taken to hospital with a reported brain tumour, most likely, stress-induced.

Shelbourne, with no manager and just one remaining senior player by February were said to be massively in debt – some reports putting it at €6 million, and others between even €10 million and €12 million. The fiasco only served to increase the pressures on the FAI, who already had to find two new replacement clubs to participate in the league following the extinction of Dublin City F.C. and Limerick F.C. in 2006. The association decided to set up a review of the awarding of a Premier Division licence to the club and eventually decided that the club should be stripped of the chance to compete in the Premier Division. Shelbourne had their Premier licence revoked and were, instead, considered lucky to be placed in the First Division for the 2007 season. There had been worries that the club would face outright extinction and that the FAI would throw the club out of the league altogether, especially after Limerick, who had less severe problems than Shelbourne, were denied a First Division licence. Liam Moggan, the chairman of the FAI's Licensing Committee resigned in protest after the decision was made to grant Shelbourne a First Division licence as he believed that the club - manager-less, player-less and heavily in the red - did not meet the criteria for the awarding of such a licence, even though its criteria were less strict than those required to pass for a Premier licence. It is probable that the Committee as a whole took an extremely sympathetic view while taking into account the long history of the club and, facing a minimal time-frame for exploring alternatives before the kick-off in March, logistical factors, such as ensuring that the league began with the preferred number of teams, when coming to a final decision to keep Shelbourne in the league.

However, the FAI did not specifically announce whether their decision was punishment for continuing off-the-field abuses from 2006, such as failing to pay players their wages, or whether it was a repercussion of Shelbourne failing to meet the requisite criteria for partaking in the 2007 Premier Division (although it is likely that the course of action taken was due to the latter as if it were a punishment for the 2006 season a deduction in points from that season's tally would be the usual penalty, which would have led to the club being stripped of their title in this scenario). If the relegation was indeed due to a failure to meet standards for 2007, the club's off-the-field abuses during 2006 remain to be seen as having been permissible for that season.

Meanwhile, Waterford United were invited to take Shelbourne's place in the Premier Division for 2007 as they were the next best-placed First Division club in the Independent Assessment Group's rankings. Waterford United accepted the invitation, while the task of sourcing funds, a manager and squad before the transfer-deadline of 28 February remained at the forefront of the club's worries by mid-February. On 23 February, Shelbourne announced that Dermot Keely had been appointed as their new manager. The signing of a new squad of players commenced immediately afterward - quite a few of these players being youngsters and loaned players from other clubs, although the club did also manage to entice a number of ripened seniors to Tolka Park for the 2007 season.

== Club ==
=== Club information ===
Chairman, Director	Joseph M Casey
Director	Andy Byrne
Secretary	Colm Murphy
Commercial Manager	Niall Fitzmaurice
Ground	Tolka Park

=== Commercial partners ===
Title	Sponsor
Main Sponsor	JW Hire
Kit, Associate Sponsor	Umbro
Associate Sponsor	Nivea for Men
Associate Sponsor	Irish Daily Star
Associate Sponsor	Bus Éireann
Associate Sponsor	Dulux

=== Coaching and Medical staff ===
Position	Name
Manager	Dermot Keely
Assistant manager	Colin O'Neill
Goalkeeping coach	Fred Davis
Head physio	Tony McCarthy
Assistant physio	Stephen Weafer
Equipment Manager	Pat Roche
Kit Administrator	Johnny Watson

== Pre-season ==
=== Exodus ===
This is the squad that completed the 2006 season, winning the Premier Division in the process. Note: Flags indicate national team as defined under FIFA eligibility rules; some limited exceptions apply. Players may hold more than one non-FIFA nationality.

No.	Pos.	Nation	Player
1	GK	WAL	Steve Williams
2	DF	IRL	Owen Heary (c)
3	DF	IRL	David Crawley
4	DF	ENG	Dave Rogers
5	DF	WAL	Jamie Harris
6	MF	IRL	Jim Crawford
7	MF	IRL	Ollie Cahill
8	MF	IRL	Stuart Byrne
9	FW	IRL	Glen Crowe
10	FW	IRL	Jason Byrne

No.	Pos.	Nation	Player
12	MF	IRL	Greg O'Halloran
14	MF	IRL	Richie Baker
15	MF	IRL	Alan Moore
16	FW	IRL	Gary O'Neill
17	MF	IRL	Bobby Ryan
18	MF	CMR	Joseph Ndo
19	DF	IRL	Colin Hawkins
20	GK	IRL	Dean Delany
22	DF	IRL	Sean Dillon
24	MF	IRL	Liam Kearney

The following players were registered to Shelbourne, but had been sent out on loan by the then manager Pat Fenlon.

Note: Flags indicate national team as defined under FIFA eligibility rules; some limited exceptions apply. Players may hold more than one non-FIFA nationality.

No.	Pos.	Nation	Player
—	MF	IRL	James Chambers (on loan at Waterford United)
—	MF	IRL	David Tyrell (on loan at Bray Wanderers)
—	MF	IRL	Gary Deegan (on loan at Kilkenny City)

Following the ongoing financial problems during the 2006 season, Pat Fenlon resigned and the vast majority of players left. Several of them had reached the end of their contracts, whilst some were sold shortly after the celebrations in November, and others left after being declared free agents in the courts following missed payment of wages. Only 2 senior players remained with the club, the experienced Jim Crawford, and the young James Chambers who had spent 2006 on loan at Premier Division side Waterford United.

=== Withdrawal from the Setanta Cup ===
In February Shelbourne were forced to withdraw from the 2007 Setanta Sports Cup shortly before it was due to commence. The general assumption was that the club would be unable to field a team. St. Patrick's Athletic were invited to fill the vacancy, and they duly accepted.

=== Demotion ===
Before the start of the new league season, the club were demoted to the First Division by the FAI.

The FAI issued a First Division licence in place of the Premier Division licence which had been revoked by order of the FAI's First Instance Committee due to the financial situation. Shortly after this, the club's majority shareholder Ollie Byrne suffered a brain tumour and Joe Casey was installed as Chairman.

Former manager Dermot Keely was brought in as manager once more and assembled a squad of players in barely 72 hours - just in time for the club to take its place in the 2007 First Division.

=== Withdrawal from Champions League ===
On 30 March 2007, when applications for UEFA licences were nearly due and the clubs' First Division licence was up for review, Shelbourne announced that they would not be applying for a UEFA licence; thus relinquishing the Champions League spot that was rewarded for winning the league in 2006. Part of the statement read:

The club feels that following its recent success over the last number of years it would not be of benefit to the club's record to play in this year's Champions League qualifying round. It also felt that it would be of no benefit to the league's co-efficient in Europe.

League runners-up Derry City were handed the Champions League place.

== Players ==
Jim Crawford and James Chambers were the only existing senior players to stay with the club for the 2007 season. Jim was appointed captain by Keely. Goalkeeper Tony O'Dowd signed for Shelbourne, returning to the club with whom he had started his footballing career. Experienced defender Alan Murphy was signed from Longford Town and was appointed vice-captain, whilst a plethora of young players arrived from a host of clubs.

Mark Leech signed on a season-long loan from Premier Division club Drogheda United, and new Derry City arrival Kyle Moran did the same.

Four players arrived at Shelbourne from Dublin rivals Bohemians; Conor Rafferty and 2006's top scorer for the First Division Davitt Walsh signed on loan deals until the end of July, defenders Aidan Collins and Niall O'Reilly made their moves to Tolka Park permanent.

=== FIFA Regulations: Article 5.3 ===
Two of Shelbourne's new players, Mark Leech and John Brophy, who had already played with two clubs within the year prior to the season's kick-off, were left ineligible to play for the club in competitive action until July at the beginning of the season as FIFA's rules, or, in particular, Article 5.3 of FIFA’s Regulations for the Status and Transfer of Players, stated that no player could play for more than two different clubs between 1 July of one season and 30 June of the following year.

Both players were eventually cleared by FIFA, and made their competitive debuts in a 1-1 draw with Kilkenny City at Buckley Park on 30 March 2007.

=== 2007 squad ===
A total of 37 players represented Shelbourne at various stages during the 2007 season.

Note: Flags indicate national team as defined under FIFA eligibility rules; some limited exceptions apply. Players may hold more than one non-FIFA nationality.

No.	Pos.	Nation	Player
—	GK	IRL	Tony O'Dowd
—	GK	IRL	James Hussey
—	DF	IRL	Niall O'Reilly
—	DF	IRL	Aidan Collins
—	DF	IRL	Alan Murphy (Vice-captain)
—	DF	IRL	Aaran McEneff
—	DF	IRL	Daniel Ennis
—	DF	IRL	Brian Gartland
—	DF	SCO	Stuart Malcolm
—	DF	IRL	Sean L'Estrange
—	DF	SCO	Marc McCulloch
—	DF	IRL	Alan Keely
—	DF	IRL	Conor Rafferty (was on loan from Bohemians)
—	MF	IRL	Jim Crawford (Captain)
—	MF	IRL	Kieran Harte
—	MF	IRL	Glen Lacey
—	MF	IRL	Robbie O'Neill
—	MF	IRL	Mark O'Brien (was on loan from Bohemians)
—	MF	IRL	Graham Curran

No.	Pos.	Nation	Player
—	MF	IRL	Peter McGlynn
—	MF	IRL	Alan Reilly
—	MF	IRL	Joey O'Neill
—	MF	IRL	Noel Haverty (was on loan from St. Patrick's Athletic)
—	MF	IRL	James Chambers
—	MF	IRL	Ciarán Ryan
—	MF	IRL	Chris Mulhall
—	MF	IRL	Stephen Doran
—	FW	IRL	Darren McKenna
—	FW	IRL	John Brophy
—	FW	IRL	Mark Leech (was on loan from Drogheda United)
—	FW	IRL	Anto Flood
—	FW	IRL	Lee Roche
—	FW	IRL	Mark Rooney
—	FW	IRL	Davitt Walsh (was on loan from Bohemians)
—	FW	IRL	Wayne Byrne
—	FW	IRL	Ciaran Quinn
—	FW	IRL	Kyle Moran (was on loan from Derry City)

== Results ==
=== League of Ireland First Division ===
9 March 2007	Shelbourne	2 – 2	Kildare County	Tolka Park, Dublin
20:00 GMT	Brian Gartland 14'; Darren McKenna 88'	Report	Philip Gorman 4' (pen.); Gary Walsh 28'	Attendance: 1,697; Referee: Tom Connolly (Dublin)

16 March 2007	Finn Harps	2 – 1	Shelbourne	Finn Park, Ballybofey
19:45 GMT	Gordon Simms 9'; Conor Gethins 90'	Report	Davitt Walsh 66'	Referee: Derek Tomney (Dublin)

23 March 2007	Shelbourne	0 – 2	Dundalk	Tolka Park, Dublin
20:00 GMT		Report	Philip Hughes 52' (pen.); Shaun Williams 80'; Ben Whelehan (red card) 70'	Attendance: 1,896; Referee: Richie Winter (Dublin)

30 March 2007	Kilkenny City	1 – 1	Shelbourne	Buckley Park, Kilkenny
19:45 GMT	Michael Comerford 41'; Andrzej Polewczak (red card) 12'	Report	Mark Leech 12'	Referee: Tomasz Superczynski (Dublin)

6 April 2007	Shelbourne	1 – 0	Athlone Town	Tolka Park, Dublin
20:00 IST	Mark Leech 75'	Report		Referee: Mark Gough (Limerick)

13 April 2007	Shelbourne	1 – 1	Monaghan United	Tolka Park, Dublin
20:00 IST	James Chambers 67'	Report	Peter D'arcy 22'; Darren Meenan (red card) 86'	Attendance: 1,011; Referee: Pádraig Sutton (Clare)

21 April 2007	Cobh Ramblers	1 – 0	Shelbourne	St. Colman's Park, Cobh
19:30 IST	Graham Cummins 90+1'	Report		Referee: Derek Tomney (Dublin)

27 April 2007	Shelbourne	1 – 1	Limerick 37	Whitehall, Dublin
20:00 IST	Kyle Moran 61'	Report	David Wall 46'	Attendance: 894; Referee: Scott MacDonald (Scotland)

4 May 2007	Wexford Youths	1 – 1	Shelbourne	Ferrycarrig Park, Wexford
20:00 IST	Aidan Collins (o.g.) 74'	Report	Alan Murphy 45'	Attendance: 1,221; Referee: Neil Doyle (Dublin)

12 May 2007	Kildare County	1 – 1	Shelbourne	Station Road, Newbridge
19:30 IST	Alan McDermott 50'; Alan Byrne (red card) 48'	Report	Darren McKenna 45'	Attendance: 510; Referee: Edwin McNally (Cork)

24 May 2007	Dundalk	3 – 0	Shelbourne	Oriel Park, Dundalk
19:45 IST	David Crawley 2'; Cathal O'Connor 65'; Philip Hughes 77'	Report		Referee: Tom Connolly (Dublin)

28 May 2007	Shelbourne	2 – 0	Kilkenny City	Tolka Park, Dublin
19:45 IST	James Chambers 32'; Glen Lacey 76'; Davitt Walsh (red card) 83'	Report		Attendance: 563; Referee: Tomasz Superczynski (Dublin)

2 June 2007	Athlone Town	1 – 0	Shelbourne	Athlone Town Stadium, Athlone
19:00 IST	Ian Rossiter 50' (pen.); Eric Lavine (red card) 60'	Report	Glen Lacey (red card) 68'; Alan Murphy (red card) 69'	Attendance: 807; Referee: Pádraig Sutton (Clare)

22 June 2007	Monaghan United	4 – 0	Shelbourne	Kingspan Century Park, Monaghan
20:00 IST	Willie Doyle 20'; Darren Meenan 26' 82'; Robbie Farrell 44'	Report		Referee: Conor Fitzgerald (Dublin)

26 June 2007	Shelbourne	2 – 2	Cobh Ramblers	Tolka Park, Dublin
20:00 IST	Mark Leech 11'; James Chambers 75' (pen.)	Report	Brian Gartland 1' (o.g.); Graham Cummins 63'	Attendance: 648; Referee: Neil Doyle (Dublin)

29 June 2007	Limerick 37	3 – 2	Shelbourne	Jackman Park, Limerick
19:45 IST	Ross Cosgrove 51'; Kevin Waters 77'; Paul Danaher 90'	Report	Graham Curran 22'; Kieran Harte 68'	Attendance: 801; Referee: Graham Kelly (Cork)

6 July 2007	Shelbourne	1 – 0	Wexford Youths	Tolka Park, Dublin
20:00 IST	Mark Leech 75'	Report		Attendance: 754; Referee: Derek Tomney (Dublin)

20 July 2007	Finn Harps	1 – 0	Shelbourne	Finn Park, Ballybofey
20:00 IST	Stephen Parkhouse 17'	Report	Mark Leech (red card) 31'	Referee: Pat Whelan (Dublin)

27 July 2007	Shelbourne	1 – 0	Dundalk	Tolka Park, Dublin
20:00 IST	Anto Flood 17'	Report		Attendance: 1,186; Referee: Pádraig Sutton (Clare)

31 July 2007	Kilkenny City	2 – 5	Shelbourne	Buckley Park, Kilkenny
19:45 IST	Ted O'Connor 32'; John McNicholas 79'	Report	Anto Flood 35' 58' 74'; Stuart Malcolm 48'; James Chambers 80' (pen.)	Referee: Graham Kelly (Cork)

3 August 2007	Shelbourne	2 – 0	Athlone Town	Tolka Park, Dublin
20:00 IST	James Chambers 34'; Anto Flood 68'	Report		Attendance: 889; Referee: Damien Hancock (Dublin)

10 August 2007	Shelbourne	1 – 1	Monaghan United	Tolka Park, Dublin
20:00 IST	Mark Leech 79'	Report	Jason McCartney 85'	Attendance: 746; Referee: Mark Gough (Limerick)

12 August 2007	Shelbourne	0 – 1	Finn Harps	Tolka Park, Dublin
17:00 IST		Report	Shaun Holmes 90+5'	Attendance: 549; Referee: Graham Kelly (Cork)

25 August 2007	Cobh Ramblers	1 – 1	Shelbourne	St. Colman's Park, Cobh
19:45 IST	Davin O'Neill 31' (pen.)	Report	Anto Flood 22'; Alan Reilly (red card) 81'	Referee: Derek Tomney (Dublin)

1 September 2007	Shelbourne	4 – 0	Limerick 37	Tolka Park, Dublin
20:00 IST	Aidan Collins 10'; Mark Leech 24' 73'; Ciaran Quinn 75'	Report		Attendance: 767; Referee: Tomasz Superczynski (Dublin)

7 September 2007	Wexford Youths	1 – 2	Shelbourne	Ferrycarrig Park, Wexford
20:00 IST	Johnny Flynn-O'Connor 12'	Report	Mark Leech 38'; James Chambers 80'	Referee: Conor Fitzgerald (Dublin)

15 September 2007	Kildare County	1 – 4	Shelbourne	Station Road, Newbridge
19:30 IST	Stephen Cooling 66'	Report	James Chambers 12'; Mark Leech 45' 71'; Anto Flood 88'	Referee: Hugo Whoriskey (Meath)

21 September 2007	Shelbourne	1 – 2	Finn Harps	Tolka Park, Dublin
20:00 IST	Alan Keely 9'	Report	Shaun McGowan 53' 90+1'	Attendance: 767; Referee: Richie Winter (Dublin)

23 September 2007	Shelbourne	2 – 1	Kildare County	Tolka Park, Dublin
16:00 IST	Anto Flood 51'; Mark Leech 84'	Report	Dean Barrett 90+1'	Referee: Richie Winter (Dublin)

27 September 2007	Dundalk	1 – 0	Shelbourne	Oriel Park, Dundalk
19:45 IST	Robbie Doyle 16'	Report		Referee: Anthony Buttimer (Cork)

5 October 2007	Shelbourne	0 – 0	Kilkenny City	Tolka Park, Dublin
20:00 IST		Report		Attendance: 702; Referee: Darren Eady (Wales)

12 October 2007	Athlone Town	1 – 4	Shelbourne	Athlone Town Stadium, Athlone
19:45 IST	Noel McGee 73'	Report	Anto Flood 35' 62'; Mark Rooney 36'; Mark O'Brien 39'	Attendance: 470; Referee: Rob Rogers (Dublin)

19 October 2007	Monaghan United	1 – 0	Shelbourne	Kingspan Century Park, Monaghan
20:00 IST	Darren Meenan 76'	Report		Referee: Tom Connolly (Dublin)

26 October 2007	Shelbourne	1 – 2	Cobh Ramblers	Tolka Park, Dublin
20:00 IST	Anto Flood 44'	Report	Kieran O'Reilly 49'; Graham Cummins 69'	Attendance: 714; Referee: Hugo Whoriskey (Meath)

2 November 2007	Limerick 37	2 – 1	Shelbourne	Jackman Park, Limerick
19:45 GMT	Pat Purcell 44'; John Tierney 60' (pen.) (penalty missed) 88' (pen.)	Report	Mark Rooney 52'; Stuart Malcolm (red card) 87'; James Chambers (red card) 87'	Attendance: 603; Referee: Hugo Whoriskey (Meath)

10 November 2007	Shelbourne	1 – 3	Wexford Youths	Tolka Park, Dublin
19:45 GMT	Mark Leech 90+2'	Report	Johnny Flynn-O'Connor 30'; Garrett Larkin 66'; Conor Sinnott 73' (pen.)	Attendance: 720; Referee: Pádraig Sutton (Clare)

==== Final table ====
Pos	Team	Pld	W	D	L	GF	GA	GD	Pts	Qualification or relegation
1	Cobh Ramblers (C)	36	22	11	3	57	17	+40	77	Premier Division / Setanta Cup play-off
2	Finn Harps	36	23	7	6	61	20	+41	76	Premier Division after play-off
3	Dundalk	36	19	9	8	56	30	+26	66	Lost promotion/relegation play-off
4	Limerick 37 (Note: Limerick 37 replaced Limerick F.C. as members of League of Ireland.)	36	14	11	11	46	41	+5	53	
5	Shelbourne	36	11	10	15	46	46	0	43	
6	Athlone Town	36	11	8	17	40	55	−15	41	
7	Kildare County	36	9	12	15	48	62	−14	39	
8	Monaghan United	36	9	11	16	38	52	−14	38	
9	Wexford Youths (Note: Wexford Youths replaced Dublin City as members of League of Ireland.)	36	7	10	19	32	55	−23	31	
10	Kilkenny City	36	5	11	20	33	79	−46	26	

Rules for classification: 1) points; 2) goal difference; 3) number of goals scored.
(C) Champions

==== League results summary ====
Overall								Home						Away					
Pld	W	D	L	GF	GA	GD	Pts	W	D	L	GF	GA	GD	W	D	L	GF	GA	GD
36	11	10	15	46	46	0	43	7	6	5	23	18	+5	4	4	10	23	28	−5

Last updated: 10 November 2007.
Source: League of Ireland First Division Fixtures

==== League Form/Results by Round ====
Round	1	2	3	4	5	6	7	8	9	10	11	12	13	14	15	16	17	18	19	20	21	22	23	24	25	26	27	28	29	30	31	32	33	34	35	36
Ground	H	A	H	A	H	H	A	H	A	A	A	H	A	A	H	A	H	A	H	A	H	H	H	A	H	A	A	H	H	A	H	A	A	H	A	H
Result	D	L	L	D	W	D	L	D	D	D	L	W	L	L	D	L	W	L	W	W	W	D	L	D	W	W	W	L	W	L	D	W	L	L	L	L

Updated to match(es) played on 10 November 2007. Source: League of Ireland First Division Fixtures
A = Away; H = Home; W = Win; D = Draw; L = Loss

=== FAI Ford Cup ===
The draw for the FAI Ford Cup took place on 31 May 2007. Shels, like all League sides, automatically went into the second round.

15 June 2007	Shelbourne	0 – 1	Cork City	Tolka Park, Dublin
20:00 IST		Report	Roy O'Donovan 7' (pen.)	Attendance: 1,002; Referee: Richie Winter (Dublin)

=== League of Ireland Cup ===
Shelbourne began the League of Ireland Cup in the Second Round, as the club was officially classed as European entrants when the draws were made. Shelbourne were drawn against Dublin rivals Bohemians, who had begun the 2007 season in the top flight with two of last year's championship winning Shelbourne team, Owen Heary and Glen Crowe. Despite a valiant effort from the young Shelbourne team, the difference in quality eventually told, with Bohemians qualifying for the next round due to 2 late goals from the man who had scored the goal that won Shelbourne the league just a few short months previous, Glen Crowe.

8 May 2007	Shelbourne	0 – 2	Bohemians	Tolka Park, Dublin
20:00 IST		Report	Glen Crowe 68' 80'	Referee: Ian Stokes (Dublin)

=== Friendlies ===
4 March 2007	Shelbourne	1 – 0	Waterford United Selection	Tolka Park, Dublin
11.00 GMT	Davitt Walsh 8'	Report

7 July 2007	Shelbourne	0 – 2	Leeds United	Tolka Park, Dublin
19.30 IST		Report	Robbie Blake 30'; David Prutton 76'	Referee: Paul Tuite (Dublin)

== Season overview ==
Shelbourne's 2007 season in the First Division began brightly with a dogged display against Kildare County at Tolka Park less than 2 weeks after their squad was assembled. Darren McKenna's dramatic late equaliser in that game secured a point for Shels giving the Tolka Park side much optimism for the season ahead.

Shels next two games against the much fancied promotion favourites Finn Harps and Dundalk brought the young Shels side back to earth with two defeats, including conceding a last minute equaliser to Harps.

After a frustrating 1-1 draw against 10 man Kilkenny City at Buckley Park, Shels first victory of the season arrived 5 games in against Athlone Town at Tolka Park courtesy of a Mark Leech header. Shels' generally young and inexperienced side failed to build on their first victory and would draw 4 of their next 5 games, their loss during this five game period came courtesy of conceding another last minute goal this time away to Cobh Ramblers. With injuries to notable players such as Jim Crawford and Aidan Collins, Shels' strength in depth would face a stern test during this period.

A heavy 3-0 away defeat to Dundalk in May was countered by an encouraging 2-0 victory at home to Kilkenny City but that game was marred after John Brophy suffered a broken leg after a heavy challenge ruling him out of action for 4 months.

Shels inconsistent start to the season was capped with a 1-0 defeat away to Athlone Town leaving Shels far too close to the foot of the First Division table for their liking. Injuries and player departures would take their toll on Shels during June and Shels suffered their heaviest defeat of the season during this period with a 4-0 defeat away to Monaghan United. Despite encouraging displays against Cobh Ramblers (2-2 draw) and another late defeat this time to Limerick 37 (3-2) would not be not enough to prevent numerous changes during the upcoming July transfer window.

Shelbourne made significant changes at the start of the July transfer window. A total of 11 players joined Shels during the month of July including Stuart Malcolm, Marc McCulloch, Alan Keely, Anto Flood and Mark Rooney while Mark O'Brien and Noel Haverty joined Shels on loan from rivals Bohemians and St. Patrick's Athletic respectively.

The impact of Shels newly assembled squad was felt immediately with a 1-0 victory over Wexford Youths at Tolka Park, only Shels 3rd win of the season. After a 1-0 away defeat to Finn Harps, Shels revitalised themselves with 3 consecutive victories against Dundalk, Kilkenny City and Athlone Town. July's turnaround in Shelbourne's form gave Shels optimism for securing the 3rd place play-off spot.

Shels hopes of securing 3rd place were dashed over one weekend at Tolka Park with a 1-1 draw against Monaghan United and a defeat by Finn Harps with yet another last minute goal conceded.

Shelbourne Football Club was in mourning during August after the death of Chief Executive Ollie Byrne. The first match after Byrne's death came against Limerick 37 at Tolka Park. In what was an emotional night at Tolka Park, Shelbourne provided one of their most impressive displays of the season with a comprehensive 4-0 victory.

Two more victories over Wexford Youths and Kildare County gave Shels much optimism over finishing in 4th place but these ambitions were hit after another defeat to Finn Harps with yet another last minute conceded goal, the third time Shelbourne conceded a last minute winner to Harps this season.

With no promotion prospects during the remainder of the season, Shelbourne's form slipped dramatically during the season run in. Despite a comfortable 4-1 win away to Athlone Town, Shels struggled during this period with a defeat to Dundalk and a disappointing home draw to lowly Kilkenny City.

Shelbourne's finish to the season was one they would rather forget. 4 defeats in their final 4 matches marked a considerable decline in the Shels form after a new lease of life during the months of July and August.

After what was a difficult season both on and off the pitch, Shelbourne finished 5th in the First Division table and Mark Leech finished the club's top goalscorer with 12 league goals.

== 2007 season statistics ==
=== Player appearances/goals ===
As of 10 November 2007.

No.	Pos	Nat	Player	Total		First Division		FAI Cup		League Cup	
No.	Pos	Nat	Player	Apps	Goals	Apps	Goals	Apps	Goals	Apps	Goals
	FW	(Republic of Ireland) IRL	John Brophy	13	0	12	0	0	0	1	0
	FW	(Republic of Ireland) IRL	Wayne Byrne	7	0	7	0	0	0	0	0
	MF	(Republic of Ireland) IRL	James Chambers	34	7	32	7	1	0	1	0
	DF	(Republic of Ireland) IRL	Aidan Collins	18	1	17	1	0	0	1	0
	MF	(Republic of Ireland) IRL	Jim Crawford	17	0	17	0	0	0	0	0
	MF	(Republic of Ireland) IRL	Graham Curran	2	1	2	1	0	0	0	0
	MF	(Republic of Ireland) IRL	Stephen Doran	2	0	1	0	1	0	0	0
	DF	(Republic of Ireland) IRL	Daniel Ennis	1	0	1	0	0	0	0	0
	FW	(Republic of Ireland) IRL	Anto Flood	16	11	16	11	0	0	0	0
	DF	(Republic of Ireland) IRL	Brian Gartland	16	1	15	1	1	0	0	0
	MF	(Republic of Ireland) IRL	Kieran Harte	26	1	24	1	1	0	1	0
	MF	(Republic of Ireland) IRL	Noel Haverty	8	0	8	0	0	0	0	0
	GK	(Republic of Ireland) IRL	James Hussey	15	0	14	0	1	0	0	0
	DF	(Republic of Ireland) IRL	Alan Keely	18	1	18	1	0	0	0	0
	DF	(Republic of Ireland) IRL	Sean L'Estrange	8	0	8	0	0	0	0	0
	MF	(Republic of Ireland) IRL	Glen Lacey	27	1	26	1	1	0	0	0
	FW	(Republic of Ireland) IRL	Mark Leech	32	12	30	12	1	0	1	0
	DF	(Scotland) SCO	Stuart Malcolm	17	1	17	1	0	0	0	0
	DF	(Scotland) SCO	Marc McCulloch	19	0	19	0	0	0	0	0
	DF	(Republic of Ireland) IRL	Aaran McEneff	13	0	11	0	1	0	1	0
	MF	(Republic of Ireland) IRL	Peter McGlynn	6	0	6	0	0	0	0	0
	FW	(Republic of Ireland) IRL	Darren McKenna	11	2	10	2	0	0	1	0
	FW	(Republic of Ireland) IRL	Kyle Moran	10	1	9	1	0	0	1	0
	MF	(Republic of Ireland) IRL	Chris Mulhall	1	0	1	0	0	0	0	0
	DF	(Republic of Ireland) IRL	Alan Murphy	30	1	28	1	1	0	1	0
	MF	(Republic of Ireland) IRL	Mark O'Brien	18	1	18	1	0	0	0	0
	GK	(Republic of Ireland) IRL	Tony O'Dowd	26	0	25	0	0	0	1	0
	MF	(Republic of Ireland) IRL	Joey O'Neill	1	0	1	0	0	0	0	0
	MF	(Republic of Ireland) IRL	Robbie O'Neill	5	0	5	0	0	0	0	0
	DF	(Republic of Ireland) IRL	Niall O'Reilly	15	0	13	0	1	0	1	0
	FW	(Republic of Ireland) IRL	Ciaran Quinn	8	1	8	1	0	0	0	0
	DF	(Republic of Ireland) IRL	Conor Rafferty	12	0	11	0	1	0	0	0
	MF	(Republic of Ireland) IRL	Alan Reilly	7	0	7	0	0	0	0	0
	FW	(Republic of Ireland) IRL	Lee Roche	5	0	5	0	0	0	0	0
	FW	(Republic of Ireland) IRL	Mark Rooney	17	2	17	2	0	0	0	0
	DF	(Republic of Ireland) IRL	Ciarán Ryan	9	0	8	0	0	0	1	0
	FW	(Republic of Ireland) IRL	Davitt Walsh	13	1	12	1	1	0	0	0

=== Top goalscorers ===
Position	Goalscorer	Total Goals	First Division	FAI Cup	League Cup
1	(Republic of Ireland) Mark Leech	12	12	0	0
2	(Republic of Ireland) Anto Flood	11	11	0	0
3	(Republic of Ireland) James Chambers	7	7	0	0
4	(Republic of Ireland) Darren McKenna	2	2	0	0
	(Republic of Ireland) Mark Rooney	2	2	0	0
6	(Republic of Ireland) Aidan Collins	1	1	0	0
	(Republic of Ireland) Graham Curran	1	1	0	0
	(Republic of Ireland) Brian Gartland	1	1	0	0
	(Republic of Ireland) Kieran Harte	1	1	0	0
	(Republic of Ireland) Alan Keely	1	1	0	0
	(Republic of Ireland) Glen Lacey	1	1	0	0
	(Scotland) Stuart Malcolm	1	1	0	0
	(Republic of Ireland) Kyle Moran	1	1	0	0
	(Republic of Ireland) Alan Murphy	1	1	0	0
	(Republic of Ireland) Mark O'Brien	1	1	0	0
	(Republic of Ireland) Ciaran Quinn	1	1	0	0
	(Republic of Ireland) Davitt Walsh	1	1	0	0
