= Stephen Henderson (footballer, born 1988) =

Irish footballer

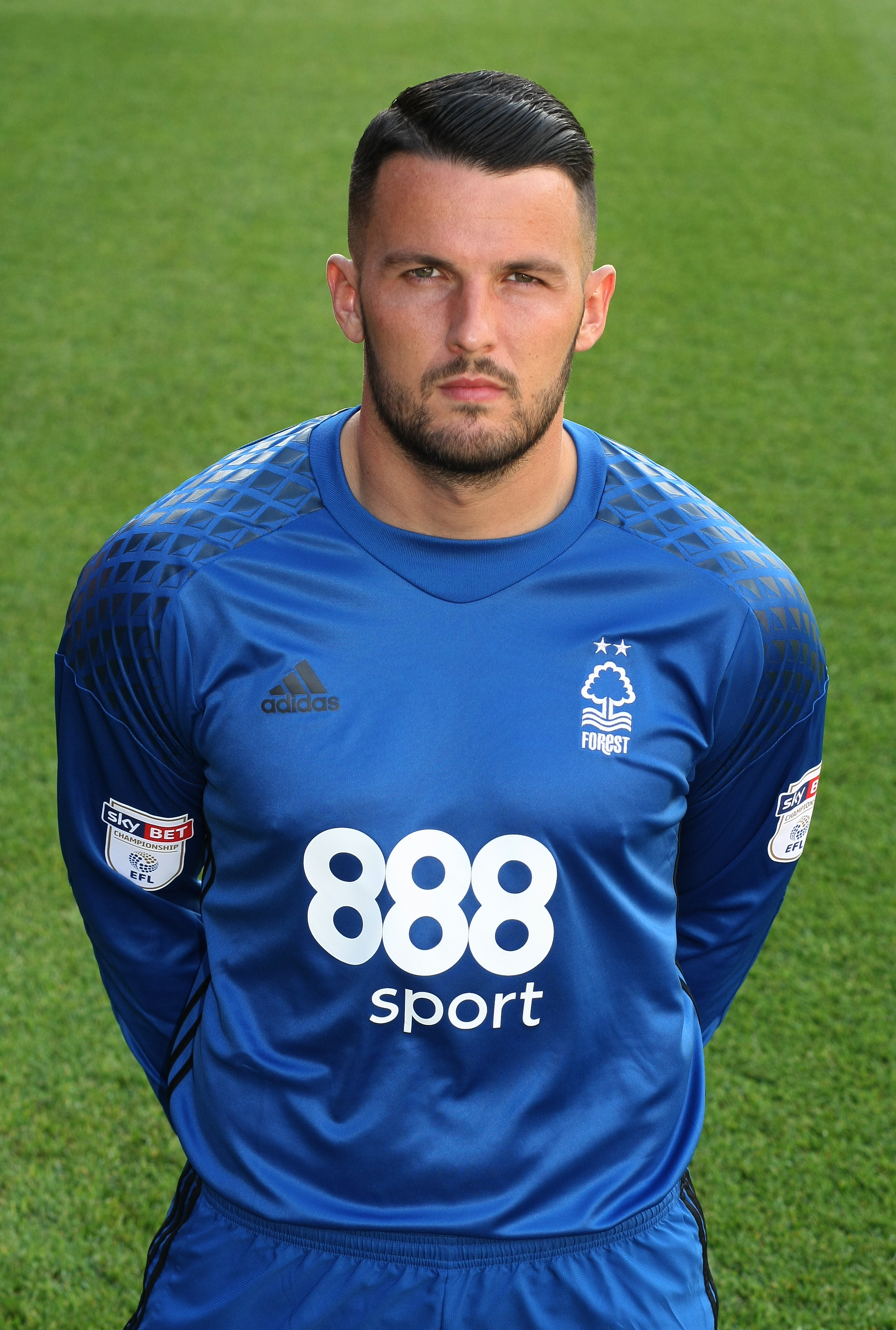
- Henderson with Nottingham Forest in 2016

Personal information
- Full name: Stephen Francis Henderson
- Date of birth: 2 May 1988 (age 38)
- Place of birth: Dublin, Ireland
- Height: 1.93 m (6 ft 4 in)
- Position: Goalkeeper

Youth career
- –2005: Belvedere
- 2005–2006: Aston Villa

Senior career*
Years	Team	Apps	(Gls)
2006–2007	Aston Villa	0	(0)
2007–2011	Bristol City	5	(0)
2007	→ York City (loan)	7	(0)
2008	→ Weymouth (loan)	16	(0)
2010	→ Aldershot Town (loan)	8	(0)
2010	→ Yeovil Town (loan)	8	(0)
2011	→ Yeovil Town (loan)	25	(0)
2011–2012	Portsmouth	25	(0)
2012	→ West Ham United (loan)	0	(0)
2012–2014	West Ham United	0	(0)
2012–2013	→ Ipswich Town (loan)	16	(0)
2013	→ Ipswich Town (loan)	8	(0)
2013	→ AFC Bournemouth (loan)	2	(0)
2014–2016	Charlton Athletic	53	(0)
2016–2019	Nottingham Forest	12	(0)
2018	→ Portsmouth (loan)	1	(0)
2018	→ Wycombe Wanderers (loan)	3	(0)
2019–2021	Crystal Palace	0	(0)
2021–2022	Charlton Athletic	2	(0)
Total		191	(0)

International career
- Republic of Ireland U16
2004–2005	Republic of Ireland U17	6	(0)
2005–2007	Republic of Ireland U19	16	(0)
2007–2010	Republic of Ireland U21	8	(0)

Managerial career
- 2023–: Charlton Athletic (goalkeeping coach)
- * Club domestic league appearances and goals as of 17:10, 10 May 2022 (UTC)

Stephen Francis Henderson (born 2 May 1988) is an Irish professional football coach and former professional footballer who is the goalkeeping coach at Charlton Athletic.

== Club career ==
=== Early career ===
Born in Dublin, Henderson began his youth career with Belvedere before joining Aston Villa in 2005 at the age of 17. He progressed through the Villa youth system before signing his first professional contract on 5 May 2006.

=== Bristol City ===
Henderson agreed to join newly promoted Championship club Bristol City on 30 May 2007 on a one-year contract starting on 1 July, when his contract with Aston Villa expired. He made his debut against Queens Park Rangers on 11 August 2007, coming on as a substitute in the second half. He joined Conference Premier club York City on a one-month loan on 31 August 2007. He made seven appearances during his spell with the club. He joined Weymouth of the Conference Premier on a one-month loan on 29 February 2008 and spent the rest of the 2007–08 season with the club, making 16 appearances. He was offered a new deal with City in May 2008. Henderson came on as a substitute in the ninth minute against Ipswich Town on 13 April 2009 and manager Gary Johnson said he "did really well".

He almost joined League One club Wycombe Wanderers on loan until the end of 2009–10 on 25 January 2010, before eventually signing for League Two club Aldershot Town on an initial one-month loan on 1 February 2010. On 17 September 2010, Henderson joined Yeovil Town on a 30-day emergency loan, making his debut on 18 September in a 4–2 away defeat to Huddersfield Town. On 3 January 2011, Henderson re-joined Yeovil on loan for the remainder of the season and subsequently kept a clean sheet on his return against Brentford.

=== Portsmouth ===
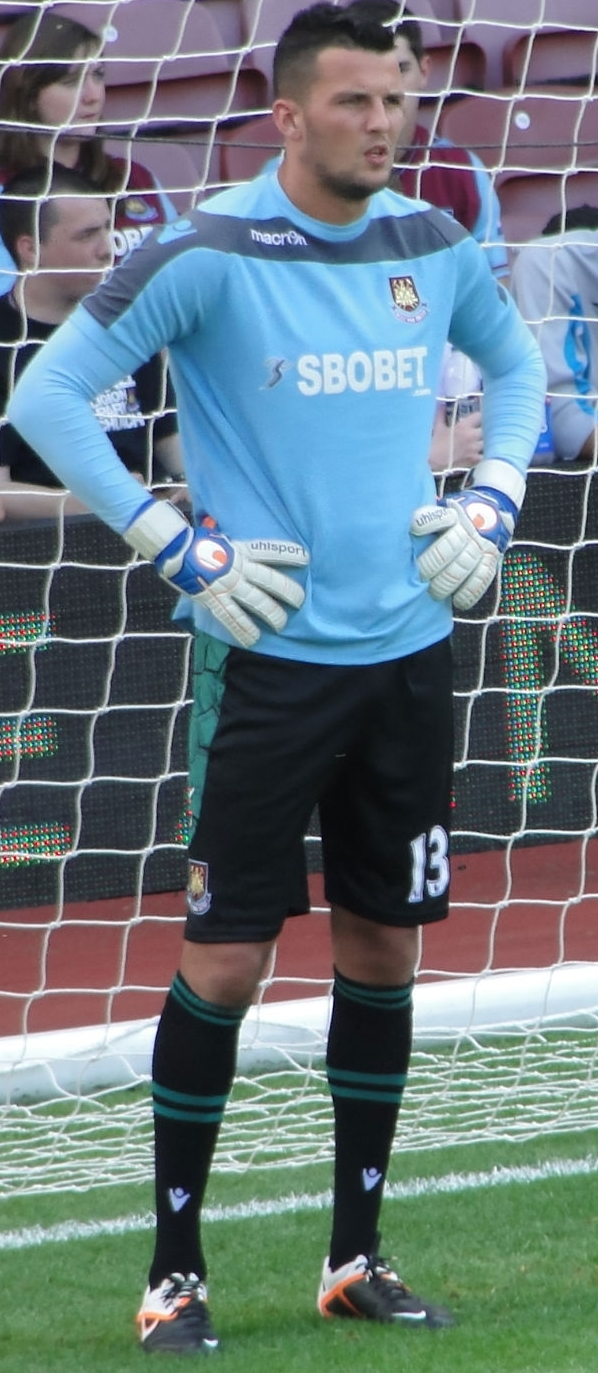
Henderson warming up with West Ham United in 2012

On 8 July 2011, Henderson joined Portsmouth on a three-year contract, citing his reasons for leaving Bristol City as frustration at his lack of first-team opportunities. Henderson was back-up goalkeeper for Jamie Ashdown until Ashdown's loss of form. He made his Portsmouth debut at Leeds United in a 1–0 defeat on 1 October 2011 and then kept his first clean sheet for Portsmouth in a 2–0 victory over Barnsley at Fratton Park on 15 October. Since making his debut, Henderson established himself as Portsmouth's first choice goalkeeper ahead of Ashdown.

=== West Ham United ===
On 16 March 2012, Henderson joined Championship rivals West Ham United on an emergency loan from Portsmouth until the end of the season. He was unused substitute for the 2012 Championship play-off final, a result that ensured West Ham made an immediate return to the Premier League.

On 21 May 2012, Henderson joined West Ham permanently on a three-year contract for an undisclosed fee. He made his first-team debut for West Ham on 28 August 2012 against Crewe Alexandra in the League Cup. West Ham won the match 2–0. He joined Championship club Ipswich Town on a three-month loan on 16 October 2012 and made his debut in a 2–1 defeat at Hull City on 20 October. He made 16 appearances for Ipswich, and re-signed for the club on loan for the rest of the season on 31 January 2013. He was recalled to West Ham on 21 March 2013.

In October 2013 Henderson signed for AFC Bournemouth on a three-month loan as cover for the suspended first choice goalkeeper Ryan Allsop and the injured second choice goalkeeper, Darryl Flahavan. In the second game of his loan spell, an away game against Nottingham Forest, Henderson dislocated his shoulder after colliding with Forest's Simon Cox. He returned to West Ham for treatment for the injury which was expected to keep him out of football for six months. He left West Ham by mutual consent in July 2014.

=== Charlton Athletic ===
Henderson signed for Championship club Charlton Athletic on a three-year contract on 21 July 2014.

=== Nottingham Forest ===
On 22 July 2016, Henderson signed for Championship club Nottingham Forest on a three-year contract.

On 31 January 2018, Henderson rejoined League One club Portsmouth on loan until the end of the 2017–18 season.

On 4 December 2018, Henderson joined League One club Wycombe Wanderers on an initial seven-day emergency loan, which was then extended by another seven days on 12 December and then again until Christmas Day the week after.

=== Crystal Palace ===
In July 2019, he joined Crystal Palace on a season-long deal following his release from Nottingham Forest. He signed a contract extension in August 2020. He was released at the end of the 2020–21 season.

=== Return to Charlton Athletic ===
On 7 September 2021, Henderson returned to Charlton Athletic on a one-year deal.

On 10 May 2022, it was confirmed that Henderson would leave Charlton Athletic when his contract expired.

== International career ==
Henderson was capped by the Republic of Ireland at under-16, under-17 and under-19 level. He made his under-21s debut as a substitute in a 3–2 defeat away to Sweden in October 2007. He finished his under-21 career with eight caps.

Henderson was called up to the senior national team for a February 2012 friendly match against the Czech Republic, for which he was an unused substitute.

== Personal life ==
Henderson comes from a noted Irish goalkeeping family, his grandfather Paddy, his father, also Stephen, along with his two uncles, Dave and Wayne, are all former goalkeepers.

== Career statistics ==
Appearances and goals by club, season and competition
Club	Season	League			FA Cup		League Cup		Other		Total	
Club	Season	Division	Apps	Goals	Apps	Goals	Apps	Goals	Apps	Goals	Apps	Goals
Aston Villa	2006–07	Premier League	0	0	0	0	0	0	—		0	0
Bristol City	2007–08	Championship	1	0	0	0	0	0	—		1	0
Bristol City	2008–09	Championship	1	0	0	0	0	0	—		1	0
Bristol City	2009–10	Championship	3	0	0	0	0	0	—		3	0
Bristol City	2010–11	Championship	0	0	—		0	0	—		0	0
Bristol City	Total		5	0	0	0	0	0	—		5	0
York City (loan)	2007–08	Conference Premier	7	0	—		—		—		7	0
Weymouth (loan)	2007–08	Conference Premier	16	0	—		—		—		16	0
Aldershot Town (loan)	2009–10	League Two	8	0	—		—		—		8	0
Yeovil Town (loan)	2010–11	League One	33	0	—		—		—		33	0
Portsmouth	2011–12	Championship	25	0	1	0	1	0	—		27	0
West Ham United (loan)	2011–12	Championship	0	0	—		—		—		0	0
West Ham United	2012–13	Premier League	0	0	0	0	2	0	—		2	0
West Ham United	2013–14	Premier League	0	0	0	0	0	0	—		0	0
West Ham United	Total		0	0	0	0	2	0	—		2	0
Ipswich Town (loan)	2012–13	Championship	24	0	—		—		—		24	0
Bournemouth (loan)	2013–14	Championship	2	0	—		—		—		2	0
Charlton Athletic	2014–15	Championship	31	0	0	0	1	0	—		32	0
Charlton Athletic	2015–16	Championship	22	0	0	0	0	0	—		22	0
Charlton Athletic	Total		53	0	0	0	1	0	—		54	0
Nottingham Forest	2016–17	Championship	12	0	1	0	2	0	—		15	0
Nottingham Forest	2017–18	Championship	0	0	0	0	1	0	—		1	0
Nottingham Forest	2018–19	Championship	0	0	0	0	0	0	—		0	0
Nottingham Forest	Total		12	0	1	0	3	0	—		16	0
Portsmouth (loan)	2017–18	League One	1	0	—		—		—		1	0
Wycombe Wanderers (loan)	2018–19	League One	3	0	—		—		—		3	0
Crystal Palace	2019–20	Premier League	0	0	0	0	0	0	—		0	0
Crystal Palace	2020–21	Premier League	0	0	0	0	0	0	—		0	0
Crystal Palace	Total		0	0	0	0	0	0	—		0	0
Charlton Athletic	2021–22	League One	2	0	3	0	0	0	0	0	5	0
Career total			191	0	5	0	7	0	0	0	203	0

== Honours ==
West Ham United

- Football League Championship play-offs: 2012
