= Galway Cup =

The Galway Cup is an association football National Youth Tournament held annually in Galway, Ireland. The tournament takes place in Salthill Devon F.C.'s Drom Soccer Park venue.

== History ==
The competition began in the summer of 2005 in a bid to bring the international football scene to Ireland. Over 40 teams representing seven nations participated in the inaugural tournament. Academy teams of such football clubs as Celtic F.C., Preston North End F.C., Shelbourne F.C., Fulham F.C., Sheffield United F.C., Newcastle United F.C., Leeds United F.C., Aberdeen F.C., Leicester City F.C., Ipswich Town F.C., Derry City F.C., Glentoran F.C., Belvedere, MŠK Žilina, Cherry Orchard F.C. and also Football Association of Ireland youth selection have competed. The tournament includes age groups from Under-11 to Under-17 and there is a group for a girls' Under-15 tournament. Now the youth competition has gone from strength to strength and is recognized as one of the best youth tournaments in Europe. The tournament highlights are broadcast on Setanta Sports.

== Past winners ==
=== 2005 ===
Name of Competition	Sponsor	Winner
Under 16/17 Cup	Higgins Motorpark Ford	Salthill Devon
Elite Group Under 15 Cup	Finches	Football Association of Ireland Youth Selection
Under 14 Cup	Hibernian	Mervue United
Girls Under 14 Cup	Simon J Kelly Architects	Bealnumalla
Under 13 Cup	Anglo Irish Bank	Clare Select
Under 12 Cup	Ulster Bank	Galway Town

=== 2006 ===
Name of Competition	Sponsor	Winner
Under 17 Cup	Higgins Motorpark Ford	Derry City
Under 16 Cup	Anglo Irish Bank	Riada
Under 15 Standard Cup	Supermac's	Ulster Schools
Under 15 Elite Cup	Finches	Aberdeen
Under 15 Girls Cup	Vodafone Western Cellular	Lifford
Under 14 Cup	Nexus Home	Clare Select
Under 13 Club Cup	Hibernian	Salthill Devon
Under 13 District League Cup	Hibernian	Galway District League
Under 12 Cup	Sawgrass	St Francis
Under 11 Cup	Galway Bay Hotel	Barna F.C.

=== 2007 ===
Name of Competition	Sponsor	Winner
Under 17 Cup	Higgins Motorpark Ford	Salthill Devon U16's
Under 17 Plate	TBD Group Holdings	Langhorne
Under 16 Girls Cup	Irish Rail	Drumahoe
Under 15 Elite Cup	Finches	Ipswich Town
Under 15 Cup	Supermac's	Tuam Celtic
Under 13 District League Cup	Nexus Homes	Dunfield
Under 13 Club Cup	Hibernian	Merrion U.C.D.

=== 2008 ===
Name of Competition	Sponsor	Winner
Under 17 Cup	Higgins Motorpark Ford	Salthill Devon
Under 17 Girls Cup	Anglo Irish Bank	Salthill Devon
Under 15 Elite Cup	Finches	Leicester City
Under 15 Club Cup	Nexus Homes	Newhill
Under 14 District Cup	Supermac's	Salthill Devon
Under 13 Academy Cup	Smyths	Donegal Schools
Under 13 Club Cup	Irish Rail	West Waterford/East Cork

=== 2009 ===
Name of Competition	Sponsor	Winner
Under 17 Cup	The Ardilaun Hotel	Belvedere
Under 17 Girls Cup	Finches	Northern Ireland
Under 15 Elite Cup	Lifestyle Sports	Leicester City
Under 15 Club Cup	Supermac's	Foyle Harps
Under 13 Academy Cup	Discover Ireland	Sports Clinic
Under 13 Club Cup	Smyths	Galway District League

=== 2010 ===
Name of Competition	Sponsor	Winner
Under 17 Cup	The Ardilaun Hotel	Mervue United
Under 17 Girls Cup	Finches	Cork Schoolgirls
Under 15 Elite Cup	Lifestyle Sports	Aberdeen
Under 15 Club Cup	Supermac's	Wexford District League
Under 13 Elite Cup	Fáilte Ireland	Galway District League
Under 13 Club Cup	Smyths	Athlone District League
