= Marc McCulloch =

Scottish footballer

Personal information
- Full name: Marc McCulloch
- Date of birth: 14 March 1980 (age 46)
- Place of birth: Edinburgh, Scotland
- Position: Left back

Youth career
- –1998: Musselburgh Union

Senior career*
Years	Team	Apps	(Gls)
1998–2003	St Johnstone	45	(0)
2003–2004	Brechin City	7	(0)
2004–2005	Greenock Morton	11	(0)
2005–2007	Arbroath	75	(3)
2007	Shelbourne	19	(0)
2008	Galway United	30	(1)
2009–2011	Arbroath	48	(0)
2011	East Fife	18	(1)
2011–2013	Stirling Albion	29	(0)
- * Club domestic league appearances and goals

Marc McCulloch (born 14 March 1980 in Edinburgh), is a Retired Scottish footballer.

== Career ==
Marc began his career at St Johnstone in 1998, spending five years at the club before joining Brechin City in the summer of 2003. First team opportunities were limited for McCulloch in his first season at the struggling First Division outfit and he departed the club to join Second Division side Morton after just one season at Glebe Park. McCulloch made a quick impression at Morton but his career there was short-lived after just six months when he joined Arbroath. McCulloch never looked back at Arbroath as he became a regular in the side and he was eventually rewarded for his excellent performances and commitment with the club's captaincy.

After two and a half years at Arbroath, McCulloch announced that he would be leaving the club to make a move to Irish football by signing for Eircom League of Ireland First Division club Shelbourne. McCulloch officially became a Shelbourne player on 1 July 2007, and made his Shels début on 6 July 2007 against Wexford Youths at Tolka Park, he provided the cross for the winning header by Mark Leech in a 1–0 win for his new team. McCulloch's experience and ability at left-back shone through at Shelbourne where he became a fan favourite amongst the Shels faithful. McCulloch made 19 league appearances for Shelbourne during the 2007 Season but he would depart Shelbourne in November 2007 to sign for Galway United. McCulloch signed for his old club Arbroath on 7 January 2009.

After asking to be released from Arbroath, McCulloch signed for East Fife.

In July 2011, he joined Stirling Albion, he made his competitive début on 23 July in a 3–1 victory over Deveronvale in a Scottish Challenge Cup first round match. After Jocky Scott was sacked by Stirling Albion in December 2011, McCulloch was appointed player/assistant manager along with new player/manager Greig McDonald. McCulloch left Stirling Albion in October 2014.
