= Derek O'Brien (footballer, born 1957) =

Irish footballer

Personal information
- Date of birth: 11 September 1957 (age 69)
- Place of birth: Dublin, Ireland
- Position: Right-back

Senior career*
Years	Team	Apps	(Gls)
1975–1976	Bohemians	28	(?)
1976–1978	Dundalk	?	(0)
1981–1983	Shamrock Rovers	24	(2)
1985–1986	Athlone Town	18	(1)
- * Club domestic league appearances and goals

Derek O'Brien (born 11 September 1957) is an Irish retired footballer who played as a right-back in the League of Ireland during the 1980s.

O'Brien played for Bohemians, Dundalk, Shamrock Rovers, Athlone Town, Longford Town and Home Farm. He represented Ireland at youth level and made 28 league appearances for Bohs.

Derek played in all four European games during his time at Oriel Park, in ties against PSV Eindhoven and Hajduk Split.

He signed for Rovers in the 1981 close season where he stayed for two seasons.

He is the brother of Fran O'Brien and Ray O'Brien, son of Fran O'Brien Senior, (Drumcondra F.C.) and father of Mark and Colin.

== Honours ==
- FAI Cup
- Dundalk
