= Stephen Caffrey =

Stephen Caffrey may refer to:

- Stephen Caffrey (footballer), Irish footballer
- Stephen Caffrey (actor), American actor
