= Wayne Henderson (footballer) =

Irish footballer (born 1983)

Personal information
- Full name: Wayne Christopher Patrick Henderson
- Date of birth: 16 September 1983 (age 43)
- Place of birth: Dublin, Ireland
- Height: 5 ft 11 in (1.80 m)
- Position: Goalkeeper

Youth career
- –1999: Cherry Orchard
- 1999–2000: Aston Villa

Senior career*
Years	Team	Apps	(Gls)
2000–2006	Aston Villa	0	(0)
2004	→ Tamworth (loan)	3	(0)
2004	→ Wycombe Wanderers (loan)	3	(0)
2004	→ Notts County (loan)	9	(0)
2004–2005	→ Notts County (loan)	2	(0)
2005	→ Brighton & Hove Albion (loan)	16	(0)
2006–2007	Brighton & Hove Albion	36	(0)
2007–2011	Preston North End	9	(0)
2009	→ Grimsby Town (loan)	14	(0)
Total		92	(0)

International career
1999–2000	Republic of Ireland U16	11	(0)
2002	Republic of Ireland U19	2	(0)
2004–2005	Republic of Ireland U21	12	(0)
2006–2007	Republic of Ireland	6	(0)
- * Club domestic league appearances and goals

Wayne Christopher Patrick Henderson (born 16 September 1983) is an Irish former footballer who played as a goalkeeper. Henderson first professional club was Aston Villa and following a series of loans went on to play most notably for Brighton and Hove Albion as well as playing six times for the Republic of Ireland. Henderson retired in 2009 following a spinal injury.

== Personal life ==
Born in Dublin, Henderson comes from a family of goalkeepers. His father Paddy played for Shamrock Rovers in the 1960s, and older brothers Dave and Stephen played with great success in the League of Ireland in the 1980s and 1990s. His nephew Stephen played for Crystal Palace. Henderson is married to former The Apprentice contestant Liz Locke.

== Club career ==
Henderson played schoolboy football for Dublin side Cherry Orchard, before joining Aston Villa in 1999. He did not play for Villa's first team, but he wore the number 1 shirt in their FA Youth Cup win in 2002. During his time at Villa, Henderson was loaned out several times: to Tamworth in March 2004; Wycombe Wanderers (April–May 2004), Notts County (August to October 2004 and December 2004 to January 2005), and Brighton and Hove Albion (August to December 2005).

Following his loan spell at Brighton, he was purchased by the club in January 2005. On 30 January 2007, Henderson handed in a transfer request at the Seagulls, and on 31 January he joined Preston North End for a fee of £150,000, which could rise to £250,000 depending on first-team and international appearances.

However, after only a handful of appearances for Preston North End, Henderson picked up a serious back injury in August 2007. He was expected to return to training in time for pre season the following season, however complications with the injury kept him out for longer than expected.

On 27 February 2009, Henderson signed an initial one-month loan deal with Grimsby Town. Henderson was signed by Grimsby boss Mike Newell to fill the boots of their keeper at the time Phil Barnes whose performances had dipped. Henderson was an integral part of the Grimsby side that managed to stave off relegation from the Football League.

On 15 March 2011, after battling against a serious spine injury for over two years and never fully recovering, Henderson was released from his contract at Preston. He announced his retirement the following week.

== International career ==
Henderson represented Republic of Ireland at every level including the U-16 team at the 2000 UEFA European Under-16 Championship and the U-20 team at the 2003 FIFA World Youth Championship, and was the first-choice goalkeeper for the Republic of Ireland Under-21 football team.

On 16 February 2006 Henderson received his first senior call up to the Republic of Ireland and made his international debut on 1 March 2006, playing in the second half of the 3–0 win over Sweden. He received his second cap in the 1–0 defeat to Chile, although keeping a clean sheet. Henderson was also called up to face the Czech Republic in a Euro 2008 qualifier in October 2006; the final score was 1–1, and against San Marino in a Euro 2008 qualifier, finishing 2 – 1 to Ireland. He was capped six times by the Republic of Ireland from 2006 to 2007.
