= Stephen Henderson (footballer, born 1966) =

Irish association footballer and manager

Personal information
- Date of birth: 2 January 1966 (age 60)
- Place of birth: Dublin, Ireland
- Position: Goalkeeper

Youth career
- –1984: Stella Maris

Senior career*
Years	Team	Apps	(Gls)
1984–1986	Shelbourne	11	(0)
1986–1988	Dundalk	4	(0)
1988–1990	Limerick City		
1990–1992	Lisburn Distillery		
1992	St James's Gate	2	(0)
1992–1995	Cobh Ramblers		
1995–1996	St James's Gate		
1996–1998	Ards		
1998–1999	Finn Harps		
1999	Dundalk		

Managerial career
- 2004–2008: Cobh Ramblers
- 2009–2011: Waterford United
- 2015–2019: Cobh Ramblers
- 2022–2024: Longford Town
- 2024–: Cobh Wanderers
- * Club domestic league appearances and goals

Stephen Henderson (born 2 January 1966) is an Irish football coach and former player who played as a goalkeeper.

== Personal life ==
Stephen Henderson comes from a goalkeeping family. His father, Paddy, was a League of Ireland goalkeeper, as was his older brother Dave. His younger brother Wayne was a Republic of Ireland international goalkeeper and Henderson's son, Stephen, played as a goalkeeper for the Republic of Ireland under-21 team.

== Career ==
Henderson played underage football with Stella Maris F.C. before joining Shelbourne in the summer of 1984. He made his debut for Shels in a League Cup match against Sligo Rovers at the Showgrounds on 8 September 1985. His League debut followed in October when he played in a 3–0 defeat to Dundalk at Harold's Cross Stadium.

Henderson made 11 league appearances for Shelbourne in 1985–86, as well as a further seven appearances in cup competition, but left the Reds that summer to join Dundalk where he made four league appearances in the latter half of the season under manager Turlough O'Connor.

Henderson went on to sign for Limerick City and later followed Billy Hamilton from Limerick to Lisburn Distillery in 1992 before going on to play for St James's Gate and Cobh Ramblers.

Between 1996 and 1998 Henderson played for Ards including 2 appearances in the 1997 UEFA Intertoto Cup against AJ Auxerre where he conceded against Stéphane Guivarc'h and FC Lausanne-Sport.

Henderson left Ards for Finn Harps and finished his playing career at Dundalk.

== Managerial career ==
Henderson spent four years as the goalkeeping coach at Cork City. When the manager's job at neighbouring Cobh Ramblers became available in 2004, he became the first member of his family to become a senior manager. He made his managerial bow at Finn Park on 4 September. He guided the club to third place in the First Division table in 2005, their highest league placing since 1999, and fourth place the following season before delivering the club their first ever piece of silverware when he guided Cobh Ramblers to the First Division title in 2007. Cobh were relegated in 2008 from the Premier Division and Henderson took up the manager's post at Waterford United in December 2008.

He led the club to the final of the League Cup and the semi-finals of the FAI Cup in 2009, and to the promotion play-offs the following season. However, after an indifferent start to the following season, in May 2011 Henderson was sacked by the Blues.

In October 2015, he re-joined Cobh Ramblers on new three-year contract and the following season he guided Ramblers to Munster Senior Cup victory and a third-place league finish. Ramblers reached the final of the EA Sports Cup in 2018 when they lost 3–1 to Derry City in a game played in Derry. With the side struggling in the league, Henderson left Cobh in June 2019. He immediately became Head of Youth Development at Shelbourne in a position he held until April 2021.

On 24 November 2022, Henderson made his return to first-team management when he was appointed manager of Longford Town. Longford finished in eighth place of ten teams at the end of the 2023 League of Ireland First Division season. The following season began very poorly with the side bottom of the table and winless after eight games when Henderson departed as manager on 13 April 2024.

In June 2024, Henderson was appointed manager of Munster Senior League side, Cobh Wanderers.

== Honours ==
=== As a manager ===
Cobh Ramblers

- League of Ireland First Division (1): 2007
- Munster Senior Cup 2016
