= Belvedere F.C. =

- Full name: Belvedere Football Club
- Nickname: The Belvo
- Founded: 1971
- Ground: Fairview Park, Dublin; Clontarf Road Complex
- Chairman: John Hayden
- League: Dublin & District Schoolboy League
- Website: belvederefc.ie
| Home colours | Away colours |

Belvedere Football Club is an Irish association football club based in Fairview/Clontarf, Dublin. Belvedere currently fields teams in the Dublin & District Schoolboy League. The club has also entered teams in the FAI Youth Cup, the FAI Under-17 Cup, the Milk Cup and the Umbro Galway Cup. Like Home Farm, Stella Maris and Cherry Orchard, Belvedere is well known for its youth system which has successfully produced hundreds of players who have gone onto play & coach for professional clubs throughout Ireland, the United Kingdom and worldwide. In addition hundreds have also gone on to represent the Republic of Ireland at various international levels & to date the club have 15 full internationals.

== History ==
Belvedere Football Club was founded in 1971 by Vincent Butler and Fergus McCabe in North Inner City Dublin. It was originally the football section of Belvedere Youth Club, the oldest youth centre in the country having been formed in 1918. The club first began to field teams in the Dublin & District Schoolboy League in 1971–72. In the seasons since the club has won an astonishing array of youth league and cup competitions at both provincial and national level. The club first came to national prominence in 1987–88 when they won the FAI Under-17 Cup.

In February 1990 the club played a small part in launching the career of Roy Keane. Belvedere played a Cobh Ramblers team featuring Keane in an FAI Youth Cup game at Fairview Park. Former Belvedere manager and Nottingham Forest scout, Noel McCabe subsequently recommended Keane to Brian Clough. In 1990–91 Belvedere won the FAI Youth Cup for the first time and within a few seasons Mark Kennedy and then Curtis Fleming became the first two former Belvedere players to represent the Republic of Ireland at full international level. Initially Belvedere recruited players from its home base in Northside, Dublin. However, as the clubs reputation grew, it also began to recruit from throughout the Greater Dublin Area and then nationally throughout Ireland. Players from outside Dublin were known as "Belvo culchies" and included, among others, David Forde.

In 2004 Belvedere were runners-up in the Milk Cup, a youth football tournament in Northern Ireland, losing 3–1 to Heart of Midlothian in the final. In 2009 they also won the Umbro Galway Cup. During this era they were also regular winners of the FAI Under-17 Cup.

On 31 May 2015 during an away game against St Kevin's Boys, Shetemi Ayetigbo, a Nigerian-Irish footballer then aged 16, collapsed and died while playing for Belvedere.

== Notable former players ==
=== Players ===
Republic of Ireland internationals

- (Republic of Ireland) Thomas Butler
- (Republic of Ireland) Graham Burke
- (Republic of Ireland) Matt Doherty
- (Republic of Ireland) Stephen Elliott
- (Republic of Ireland) Curtis Fleming
- (Republic of Ireland) David Forde
- (Republic of Ireland) Wes Hoolahan
- (Republic of Ireland) Stephen Kelly
- (Republic of Ireland) Mark Kennedy
- (Republic of Ireland) Darragh Lenihan
- (Republic of Ireland) Troy Parrott
- (Republic of Ireland) Richard Sadlier
- (Republic of Ireland) Cillian Sheridan
- (Republic of Ireland) Keith Treacy

Other internationals

- (Cape Verde) Roberto Lopes
- (Montserrat) Leovan O'Garro

League of Ireland XI representatives

- (Republic of Ireland) John McDonnell
- (Republic of Ireland) Conor Powell
- (Republic of Ireland) Richie Ryan
- (Republic of Ireland) Derek Swan

Republic of Ireland B internationals

- (Republic of Ireland) Richie Byrne
- (Republic of Ireland) Tony Cousins
- (Republic of Ireland) Martin Russell

Republic of Ireland U23 international

- (Republic of Ireland) Ross Gaynor
- (Republic of Ireland) Mark Quigley
- (Republic of Ireland) Ger Rowe

Republic of Ireland U21 internationals

- (Republic of Ireland) Kwame Ampadu
- (Republic of Ireland) Hugh Atkinson
- (Republic of Ireland) Karl Bermingham
- (Republic of Ireland) John Burns
- (Republic of Ireland) Barry Cogan
- (Republic of Ireland) Tony Cousins
- (Republic of Ireland) Liam Dunne
- (Republic of Ireland) Kevin Feely
- (Republic of Ireland) Richie Foran
- (Republic of Ireland) Chris Forrester
- (Republic of Ireland) Ross Gaynor
- (Republic of Ireland) Ken Gillard
- (Republic of Ireland) James Hand
- (Republic of Ireland) Stephen Henderson
- (Republic of Ireland) Sean Kavanagh
- (Republic of Ireland) Mark Leech
- (Republic of Ireland) John McGrath
- (Republic of Ireland) Brendan Moloney
- (Republic of Ireland) Thomas Morgan
- (Republic of Ireland) Gary Mulligan
- (Republic of Ireland) Stephen Murphy
- (Republic of Ireland) John O'Sullivan
- (Republic of Ireland) Neil Poutch
- (Republic of Ireland) Conor Powell
- (Republic of Ireland) Alan Power
- (Republic of Ireland) Danny Rogers
- (Republic of Ireland) Martin Russell
- (Republic of Ireland) Robbie Ryan
- (Republic of Ireland) Alan Sheehan
- (Republic of Ireland) Derek Swan
- (Republic of Ireland) Kevin Thornton

Republic of Ireland U19 internationals

- (Republic of Ireland) Neill Byrne
- (Republic of Ireland) Tim Clancy
- (Republic of Ireland) Adrian Harper
- (Republic of Ireland) Jimmy Keohane
- (Republic of Ireland) Ben McCormack
- (Republic of Ireland) Ricky McEvoy

Republic of Ireland U18 internationals

- (Republic of Ireland) Jake Carroll
- (Republic of Ireland) Kevin Dawson
- (Republic of Ireland) Mark Hughes
- (Republic of Ireland) Ben McCormack
- (Republic of Ireland) Daryl McMahon
- (Republic of Ireland) Dara McGuinness
- (Republic of Ireland) Jad Hakiki
- (Republic of Ireland) David Toure
- (Republic of Ireland) Nathan Murphy
- (Republic of Ireland) Mark O'Brien
- (Republic of Ireland) John O'Hara
- (Republic of Ireland) Alan Reilly

Republic of Ireland U17 internationals

- (Republic of Ireland) Philip Byrne
- (Republic of Ireland) Wesley Byrne
- (Republic of Ireland) Colin Cassidy
- (Republic of Ireland) Alan Cawley
- (Republic of Ireland) Paul Corry
- (Republic of Ireland) Brody Lee
- (Republic of Ireland) Ben McCormack

Republic of Ireland U16 internationals

- (Republic of Ireland) Kevin Grogan
- (Republic of Ireland) Sean Hayden
- (Republic of Ireland) Anthony Dodd
- (Republic of Ireland) Ben McCormack
- (Republic of Ireland) Dara McGuinness

=== Managers ===
- (Republic of Ireland) Thomas Butler
- (Republic of Ireland) Tony Cousins
- (Republic of Ireland) Trevor Croly
- (Republic of Ireland) Kevin Grogan
- (Republic of Ireland) Stephen Kenny
- (Republic of Ireland) John McDonnell
- (Republic of Ireland) Daryl McMahon
- (Republic of Ireland) Martin Russell
- (Republic of Ireland) Tim Clancy

== Honours ==
- FAI Youth Cup
  - Winners: 1990–91, 1998–99, 2004–05: 3
- FAI Under-17 Cup
  - Winners: 1987–88, 1989–90, 1999–2000, 2004–05, 2006–07, 2008–09, 2009–10, 2010–11: 8
- Milk Cup
  - Runners-up: 2004: 1
- Galway Cup
  - Winners: 2009: 1
