= Mark Hughes (footballer, born 1993) =

Irish footballer

Personal information
- Date of birth: 28 April 1993 (age 33)
- Place of birth: Athy, Ireland
- Position: Midfielder

Youth career
- –2012: Belvedere

Senior career*
Years	Team	Apps	(Gls)
2012–2013	Scunthorpe United	0	(0)
2013–2014	Athlone Town	52	(2)
2015	Drogheda United	25	(0)
2016	Longford Town	23	(1)
2017–2018	Shelbourne	38	(0)
2019–2022	Drogheda United	41	(1)

International career
- Republic of Ireland U18
- * Club domestic league appearances and goals as of 4 May 2022

Mark Hughes is an Irish former professional footballer who played as a midfielder.

== Career ==
Hughes signed for English club Scunthorpe United from Belvedere in August 2012. He made his debut against Notts County on 4 September 2012. He retired in May 2022, aged 29, due to injury.
