= Eddie Byrne (footballer) =

Irish footballer

Personal information
- Date of birth: 31 October 1951 (age 75)
- Place of birth: Dublin, Ireland
- Position: Striker

Youth career
- 1969–1971: Shamrock Rovers

Senior career*
Years	Team	Apps	(Gls)
1970–1973	Shamrock Rovers	40	(1)
1973–1974	Bohemians	6	(3)
1974–1976	Bluebell United	?	(?)
1976–1978	Bohemians	37	(10)
1978	Philadelphia Fury	18	(1)
1978–1981	Shamrock Rovers	49	(13)
1980–1981	VfB Lübeck	?	(?)
1981–1982	Shelbourne	27	(8)
1982–1985	Athlone Town	56	(8)
1985–1986	Longford Town	17	(1)
- * Club domestic league appearances and goals

Edward Byrne (born 31 October 1951) was an Irish soccer player during the 1970s and 1980s.

Byrne played for Shamrock Rovers and Bohemians (two spells) amongst others during his career in the League of Ireland. He began his career at Rovers in 1969 and spent three seasons at Glenmalure Park before joining Bohs for one season. He drifted out of league football to play for Bluebell United before returning to Bohs the following season. He made five appearances for Bohs in European competition.

Byrne joined Philadelphia Fury with Fran O'Brien and Pat Byrne in March 1978.

He signed again for Rovers from Philadelphia Fury in August 1978 along with Bobby Tambling and went on to make 1 European appearance for the Hoops.

Along with Eamonn Gregg he had a short spell at VfB Lübeck in Germany during the 1980–81 season.

== Sources ==
- Paul Doolan; Robert Goggins. The Hoops. ISBN 0-7171-2121-6.
