= Robbie Dunne =

Irish former soccer player

Personal information
- Date of birth: 5 October 1979 (age 47)
- Place of birth: Dublin, Ireland
- Position: Midfielder

Youth career
- Belvedere

Senior career*
Years	Team	Apps	(Gls)
1998–2001	UCD	42	(4)
2000–2001	→ Cobh Ramblers (loan)	14	(?)
2001–2002	St Patrick's Athletic	0	(?)
2002–2003	Drogheda United	22	(0)
2003	Dublin City	31	(?)
2004	Dundalk	36	(6)
2005	Bray Wanderers	14	(0)
2006–2007	Dundalk	78	(9)
- * Club domestic league appearances and goals

Robbie Dunne (born 5 October 1979) is an Irish former soccer player who played for Dundalk in the League of Ireland First Division. Dunne made two appearances for UCD in the 2000 UEFA Intertoto Cup against PFC Velbazhd Kyustendil as the students went out on away goals.
