= Mark O'Brien (footballer, born 1984) =

Irish footballer

Personal information
- Date of birth: 13 May 1984 (age 42)
- Place of birth: Dublin, Ireland
- Position: Central midfielder

Youth career
- Belvedere

Senior career*
Years	Team	Apps	(Gls)
2002–2004	Shamrock Rovers	27	(3)
2005–2007	Bohemians	19	(0)
2006	→ Shamrock Rovers (loan)	11	(0)
2007	→ Shelbourne (loan)	18	(1)
2007–2009	Shelbourne	60	(3)
2010	Bray Wanderers	4	(0)
2010	Shelbourne	0	(0)
2011–2012	Drogheda United	44	(2)
2012	Dundalk	0	(0)
2015–????	Drogheda United	0	(0)

International career
- Republic of Ireland U18
- * Club domestic league appearances and goals

Mark O'Brien (born 13 May 1984) is an Irish former professional footballer who played as a central midfielder.

O'Brien comes from a footballing background as his father Derek played for Shamrock Rovers from 1981 to 1983 and his uncles Fran and Ray both played for Ireland. His younger brother Colin played alongside him at Shelbourne.

== Career ==
=== Early years ===
O'Brien was born in Dublin, Ireland. He played for Belvedere at youth level and made several appearances at under-age level for Ireland. He began his senior career at Shamrock Rovers making his debut on 7 May 2003 in a League of Ireland Cup tie against Bray Wanderers. He impressed enough to win the Young Player of the Year at the club in 2004.

=== Bohemians ===
O'Brien then signed for bitter rivals Bohemians for the 2005 season and he made his debut for Bohs against his former club Shamrock Rovers on 18 March 2005 at Dalymount Park. He never showed the same form at Bohemians and midway through the 2006 season, he returned to Shamrock Rovers on loan where he helped the Hoops to the First Division title. After his loan spell finished at the end of the 2006 season, he returned to Bohemians but had failed to appear for the first team during the 2007 season only making under-21 appearances.

=== Shelbourne ===
In need to restart his flagging career, O'Brien departed Bohemians to sign on loan for nearby rivals Shelbourne in July 2007. Mark made his Shelbourne debut on 6 July 2007 against Wexford Youths at Tolka Park in a 1–0 win for Shels and he scored his first Shels goal during a 4–1 victory over Athlone Town at Lissywoollen on 12 October 2007.

O'Brien permanently joined Shelbourne on 29 November 2007. He finished as a First Division runner-up with Shelbourne in both 2008 and 2009 as Shelbourne narrowly missed out on promotion during both seasons. O'Brien was released by Shelbourne following the conclusion of the 2009 season. In his 3 seasons at Shelbourne he made 85 league and cup appearances scoring 5 goals.

=== Bray Wanderers ===
In March 2010 O'Brien returned to football signing for Bray Wanderers. He scored twice on his Bray debut in the EA Sports Cup against Drogheda United but failed to hold down a first team place after this. O'Brien parted company with Bray Wanderers in July 2010 after making five appearances for the club. On 27 August 2010, O'Brien returned to Shelbourne after training with the club for a number of weeks.

=== Drogheda United ===
Prior to the start of the 2011 League of Ireland season, O'Brien joined Drogheda United. His first goal for the Drogs was the winner in a 2–1 win over Galway United on 26 May 2011, their first win of the season. After nailing down a starting place in Mick Cooke's midfield, O'Brien signed a new one-year contract for the Drogs, keeping him at United Park until the end of the 2012 season.

=== Dundalk ===
He joined Dundalk on the final day of the 2012 July transfer window. His father had played for the Lilywhites in the 1970s.

== Honours ==
Shamrock Rovers

- League of Ireland First Division: 2006

Individual

- Shamrock Rovers Young Player of the Year: 2004
