= Stephen Murphy (footballer) =

Irish footballer

Personal information
- Date of birth: 5 April 1978 (age 48)
- Place of birth: Dublin, Ireland
- Height: 6 ft 0 in (1.83 m)
- Position: Central midfielder

Youth career
- 6: Belvedere

Senior career*
Years	Team	Apps	(Gls)
- Belvedere
- Huddersfield Town
	Halifax Town	25	

International career
- Republic of Ireland U20
- Republic of Ireland U21
- * Club domestic league appearances and goals

Stephen Murphy (born 5 April 1978) is a former professional footballer who played as a midfielder for Belvedere, before signing with Huddersfield Town in 1994, staying there for four years. He went on to sign for Halifax Town where he made 25 Football League appearances. He has also represented the republic of Ireland at U-15 level all the way up to the Ireland U-21s.

== Honours ==
Republic of Ireland

- FIFA World Youth Championship Third Place: 1997
