= Ray O'Brien =

Irish footballer

Ray O'Brien (born 21 May 1951) is an Irish former professional footballer.

== Early life ==
O'Brien was born in Dublin.

== Career ==
O'Brien began his career with Shelbourne before transferring to Manchester United.

He was then transferred to Notts County in 1974 for £45,000 without making the first team at Old Trafford.

At Meadow Lane he created a club record in 1979–80 when he became the first full back to finish as leading scorer. He spent ten years at County making over 300 Football League appearances.

He also won five caps for the Republic of Ireland, making his debut on 24 March 1976 in a 3–0 home win over Norway in a friendly game.

He later managed non-League clubs including Boston United and Arnold Town.

His brother Fran O'Brien also played for his country.
