= Alan Reilly =

Irish footballer

Personal information
- Date of birth: 22 August 1980 (age 46)
- Place of birth: Dublin, Ireland
- Position: Left midfielder

Youth career
- Stella Maris
- Belvedere
- Manchester City

Senior career*
Years	Team	Apps	(Gls)
1997–1999	Manchester City	0	(0)
1999–2002	Halifax Town	145	(22)
2002–2003	Bohemians		(0)
2003	Waterford United		(8)
2004–2005	Drogheda United	35	(6)
2005–2006	St Patrick's Athletic	22	(2)
2006	Waterford United	0	(0)
2007	Shelbourne	7	(0)

International career
- Republic of Ireland U18
- * Club domestic league appearances and goals

Alan Reilly (born 22 August 1980) is an Irish former professional footballer. Reilly played as a left midfielder

== Career ==
Reilly was born in Dublin, Ireland. He played his schoolboy football for Stella Maris, and he has also played with Belvedere. He was spotted by Manchester City who offered him a one-year YTS deal while playing for Stella Maris. Reilly also went on to represent Ireland at youth level during this period. At Manchester City, Reilly impressed enough to be offered a three-year professional contract. He became a regular for City's youth and reserves teams alongside the likes of Shaun Wright-Phillips. He struggled to breakthrough to the first team and moved to Halifax Town on a three-year contract. He was a regular in the Halifax team during his time at The Shay but when his contract expired, he decided to return to Ireland.

Upon returning to his homeland, Reilly signed for Stephen Kenny's Bohemians and made his debut in a 1–1 draw with Cork City on 1 November 2002. He made numerous appearances during the 2002–03 season as Bohs won the League of Ireland Premier Division. After his time at Bohs, he played for Waterford United (twice), Drogheda United and St. Patrick's Athletic.

In July 2006, Reilly rejoined Waterford United but his second spell at the club was short-lived as he was released from his latest club within two weeks of joining and having not played once since his return. During that two-week period Mike Kerley was sacked as Waterford manager and Gareth Cronin replaced him resulting in Reilly's departure as he was not part of Cronin's plans. Reilly stayed out of the game for the next 12 months until he joined Shelbourne in July 2007. Reilly made his Shelbourne debut as a second-half substitute against Finn Harps on 20 July 2007 at Finn Park. Reilly made seven appearances for Shelbourne before being released at the end of the 2007 Season.
