= Fran O'Brien (footballer) =

Irish footballer and manager

Personal information
- Date of birth: 7 April 1955 (age 71)
- Place of birth: Dublin, Ireland
- Position: Midfielder

Senior career*
Years	Team	Apps	(Gls)
1974–1978	Bohemians	62	(1)
1978–1980	Philadelphia Fury	70	(12)
1981–1982	Montreal Manic	56	(9)
1981–1982	Montreal Manic (indoor)	8	(5)
1983–1984	Vancouver Whitecaps	49	(11)
1983–1984	Vancouver Whitecaps (indoor)		
1984–1985	Dallas Sidekicks (indoor)	43	(13)
1985–1987	Tacoma Stars (indoor)	71	(12)
1988	Hamilton Steelers	4	(0)
1988–1990	Seattle Storm		
1991	Hamilton Steelers	12	(0)

International career
1978	Republic of Ireland	4	(0)

Managerial career
- 2007: Tacoma Tide
- * Club domestic league appearances and goals

Fran O'Brien (born 7 April 1955) is an Irish footballer who played during the 1970s and 1980s. He was the first player to be capped for the Republic of Ireland playing in United States, earning a total of four caps. He also coached for the premier club PacNW in Seattle.

== Playing career ==
O'Brien won a league winners medal with Bohemians in 1974–75. During his career with Bohs, Fran made 62 league appearances with 1 goal and 8 appearances in European competition scoring 1 goal. In 1978, O'Brien moved along with Pat Byrne and Eddie Byrne to the Philadelphia Fury of the North American Soccer League (NASL). When the Fury moved to Montreal after the 1980 season, O'Brien went with the team and spent the next two seasons with the renamed Montreal Manic. In 1983, he signed with the Vancouver Whitecaps and spent the next two season with them. He was selected as an NASL all-star Honorable Mention for the 1983 season and was a second team selection with the Whitecaps in 1984. When the NASL folded at the end of the 1984 season, O'Brien signed with the Dallas Sidekicks of Major Indoor Soccer League (MISL). The Sidekicks released him on 10 September 1985 and he moved to the Tacoma Stars. He spent two seasons with the Stars before retiring and settling in Washington state. He also played with the Hamilton Steelers.

== Coaching career ==
From 2007 to 2008, O'Brien was the head coach of Tacoma Tide of the amateur USL Premier Development League in the United States.

He was also a coach for the premier club PacNW in Seattle, Washington.

He is the father of Leighton O'Brien and Ciaran O'Brien, brother of Derek O'Brien and the uncle of Mark O'Brien.
