= Mick Moody =

Irish footballer

Personal information
- Full name: Michael Moody
- Date of birth: 24 February 1960 (age 66)
- Place of birth: Wicklow, Ireland
- Position: Defender

Senior career*
Years	Team	Apps	(Gls)
1979–1983	Shelbourne		
1983–1984	Bray Wanderers		
1984–1986	Home Farm		
1986–1987	Drogheda United		
1987–1991	St Patrick's Athletic		
1991–1993	Shamrock Rovers	52	(2)
1993–1996	Bohemians	68	(2)
1996–1999	St Patrick's Athletic	31	(0)
- * Club domestic league appearances and goals

Mick Moody (born 24 February 1960) was an Irish soccer player during the 1980s and 1990s.

== Career ==
Moody was a tough defender who began his career in 1979 at Shelbourne. After a couple of years at Tolka Park, he moved to Bray Wanderers who were then a Leinster Senior League side.

In 1984, he returned to the League of Ireland and joined Home Farm where he spent 2 seasons, alongside future teammates Dave Henderson and Pat Kelch. After a year in the First Division with Drogheda United, he moved to St Patricks Athletic and would have the most successful spell of his career.

Pat's finished as runners up in 1987/88, came in third spot the following season (Mick was voted the club's Player of the Year in both seasons) before clinching the Premier Division league title in 1989/90. Due to financial problems in Inchicore, that Pat's team would soon break up and in 1992, Moody signed for Shamrock Rovers. Despite Noel King being sacked in Mick's first season at Rovers, he would make 52 league appearances (2 goals) in his 2 years at the "Hoops".

Eamonn Gregg took him to Dalymount Park in the summer of 1993 and he would go on to make 68 league appearances, scoring 2 goals at Bohemians during his 3 years at the club. He returned to St Patrick's Athletic following his time at Bohs.

== Off the field ==
Moody was a member of the Garda Síochána and made the headlines in August 1989 when he arrested U2 member Adam Clayton.

== Honours ==
- League of Ireland: 1
  - St Patricks Athletic - 1989/90
