= Paddy Henderson (footballer) =

Irish footballer

Patrick Henderson (born 1937) is an Irish former footballer who played as a goalkeeper.

== Football career ==
Henderson began his career at Holyhead Town in Wales before signing for League of Ireland side Shamrock Rovers in 1961. He was key first team player and made two appearances in the European Champion Clubs' Cup while at Glenmalure Park against SK Rapid Wien. Henderson signed for Drogheda United, in 1965 before retiring with a back injury in 1967.

== Family ==
Henderson has three sons involved in football. Eldest son, Dave was a goalkeeper who had two spells with the Hoops in the 1970s and 1990s, he is best known for his long term association with Bohemians The middle son, Stephen managed Cobh Ramblers F.C. to the Eircom First Division title and later Waterford United. Youngest son, Wayne, is a talented goalkeeper he has played for Aston Villa, Brighton and is currently contracted to Preston North End. Wayne has also represented then Republic of Ireland national football team at Senior level.

== Sources ==
- Paul Doolan; Robert Goggins (1993). The Hoops. Gill & Macmillan Ltd. ISBN 0-7171-2121-6.
