= Gary McPhee =

Scottish footballer (born 1980)

Personal information
- Date of birth: 18 April 1980 (age 46)
- Place of birth: Glasgow, Scotland
- Height: 1.83 m (6 ft 0 in)
- Position: Forward

Youth career
- Vitesse

Senior career*
Years	Team	Apps	(Gls)
1999–2003	Coventry City	0	(0)
1999	→ Cwmbran Town (loan)		
1999	→ Brighton & Hove Albion (loan)	0	(0)
2000–2001	→ Newry Town (loan)		
2003	→ Portadown (loan)		
2003–2004	St Patrick's Athletic		
- Moor Green
- Nuneaton Borough
- * Club domestic league appearances and goals

Gary McPhee (born 18 April 1980) is a Scottish former footballer who played as a forward.

== Career ==
McPhee began his career with Dutch club Vitesse, before signing for English club Coventry City in September 1999. He had loan spells at Cwmbran Town, Brighton & Hove Albion, Newry Town, and Portadown. During his time with Newry, McPhee broke both his legs during a sleepwalking episode.

He played with St Patrick's Athletic, scoring on his league debut for the club.

After playing with Moor Green, he played for Nuneaton Borough, where he was voted 'Player of the Round' in the second qualifying round of the FA Cup.

== Personal life ==
McPhee's brother is fellow footballer Stephen McPhee.
