= Smyths Toys =

Irish multinational toy shop chain

Smyths Toys Superstores
- The current logo, in use since 2006

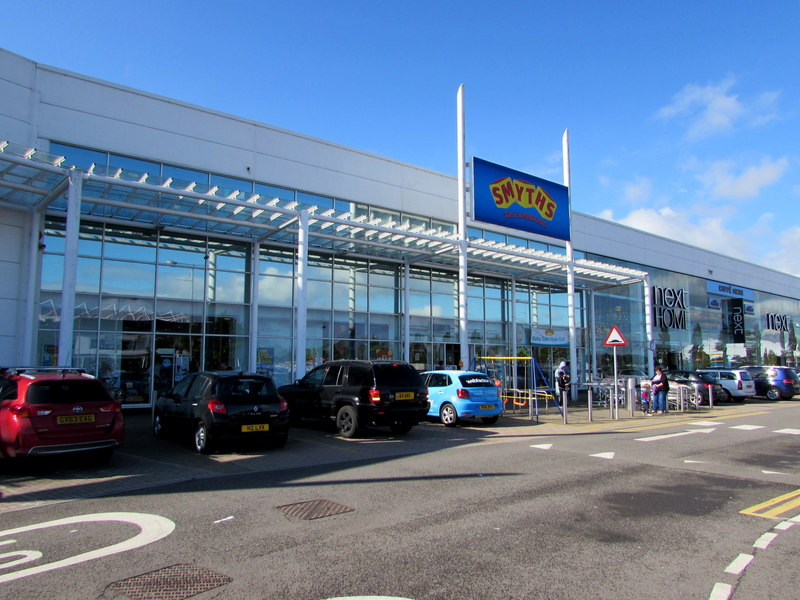
- A Smyths Toys shop in Cardiff
- Type: Private
- Industry: Toys
- Founded: 23 December 1986; 39 years ago Claremorris, County Mayo, Ireland
- Founders: Tony Smyth; Padraig Smyth; Liam Smyth; Thomas "Charles" Smyth
- Headquarters: Galway, Ireland
- Number of locations: 311 shops
- Area served: Europe
- Products: Toys; Video games
- Revenue: €2.49 billion (2023)
- Owner: Smyth family
- Number of employees: 7,985
- Website: smythstoys.com

Smyths Toys Superstores, also known simply as Smyths, is an Irish multinational toy retailer specialising in children's toys, games and entertainment products with over 300 shops throughout western and central Europe. The business is owned by the Smyth family.

The company is headquartered in Galway, with other offices in Cologne and Lille.

The group's turnover reached €1.465 billion in pandemic-hit 2020 with the majority of sales coming from the UK market while in 2023 the group turnover exceeded €2 billion.

== History ==
Smyths Toys started out as a family newsagent on Main Street, Claremorris, County Mayo in 1935. The newsagent's shop sold newspapers, cigarettes, groceries and toys.

The business opened its first dedicated toy shop in 1986, in a basement unit off Eyre Square in Galway, when their main competitors in children's toy retailing were Dunnes Stores, Quinnsworth and Roches Stores. In 1988, it moved to a slightly larger unit on Eglinton Street in Galway. Finding it difficult to make a profit from a small unit, and being unable to find a suitable larger shop in Galway, the business moved to a 6,000 square-foot unit on Henry Street, Limerick in the late 1980s.

In 1989, the business opened a second dedicated toy shop, in Woodquay in Galway, in a larger unit than its previous one on Eglinton Street. In 1992, it opened a 10,000 square-foot shop on Maylor Street, Cork. In 1994, it opened a 20,000 square-foot shop in Tallaght, Dublin and moved its Galway shop to a 7,000 square-foot unit in Galway Retail Park, which was later expanded to 14,000 square feet. It opened a large shop on Jervis Street, Dublin in 1997 and in Blanchardstown, Dublin in 1999, and a 7,000 square-foot shop in Bray, Co. Wicklow in June 2000.

By 1999, the business had an annual turnover of IR£27 million.

The original newsagent's shop in Claremorris remained in business under the Smyth's brand until late 2023.

The company is run by three brothers, Tony, Padraig and Thomas. A fourth brother and director, Liam, died in July 2023. Smyths is the UK and Ireland's largest toy retailer.

=== Expansion to the United Kingdom ===
The first Smyths Toys Superstores in the UK opened in September 2001 in Derry, Northern Ireland.

On 21 April 2007 it was announced Smyths Toys Superstores had plans to expand into Great Britain. Seeking to open about 10 superstores in the South East of England in the coming months. A Smyths Toys spokesman confirmed that the company would open its first store at Chadwell Heath, in Romford in July 2007.

=== Expansion to central Europe ===
On 24 April 2018, Smyths Toys Superstores acquired Toys "R" Us shops in Germany, Austria, and Switzerland. In 2019, all the remaining shops in those countries were rebranded to Smyths.

In July 2022, Smyths Toys Superstores acquired French toy chain PicWicToys in France out of receivership, taking over 41 shops, 2 warehouses and a head office.

== Shops and subsidiaries ==
Smyths shops by country
Country	Number of shops
Republic of Ireland	21
Northern Ireland	7
Great Britain	124
Germany	76
France	52
Austria	16
Switzerland	11
Netherlands	7
Belgium	1
Total	311

As of October 2025, Smyths Toys Superstores operates 311 shops across 7 countries: 21 in the Republic of Ireland, 7 in Northern Ireland, 124 in Great Britain, 76 in Germany, 16 in Austria, 11 in Switzerland, 52 in France, 7 in the Netherlands and 1 in Belgium.
