= Kevin Grogan (footballer) =

Irish footballer and coach

Personal information
- Date of birth: 15 November 1981 (age 44)
- Place of birth: Dublin, Ireland
- Position: Midfielder

Youth career
- –1993: Seagrange United
- 1993–1998: Belvedere
- 1998–2000: Manchester United

Senior career*
Years	Team	Apps	(Gls)
2000–2002	UCD	30	(4)
2002	Millwall	0	(0)
2004–2005	Bray Wanderers	23	(3)
2006	St Patrick's Athletic	3	(0)
2006–2007	Glentoran	1	(0)
Total		57	(7)

International career
1998	Republic of Ireland U16		

Managerial career
- 2013–: Clarkstown Eagles
Medal record
Men's football
Representing Republic of Ireland
UEFA Euro U-16
Winner	1998 Scotland
- * Club domestic league appearances and goals

Kevin Grogan (born 15 November 1981 in Dublin) is an Irish former professional football player and current coach of Clarkstown SC Eagles in the National Premier Soccer League.

A uniquely talented youth player, Grogan was signed by Alex Ferguson for Manchester United in 1997 just before playing a major role on the Ireland Under 16 team, on their way to becoming European Champions in Scotland.

However, a series of injuries stopped Kevin from progressing as a professional player and in the summer of 2000 he left Manchester United. He decided to combine football with studying and joined League of Ireland Premier Division side UCD and decided on a Diploma course in Sports Management. He made his League of Ireland debut on the opening day of the 2000-01 League of Ireland season and scored his first goals in the league at Bray Wanderers on 15 September 2000

After a long, hard battle it seemed his footballing career would be revived when he joined Millwall in 2002. However, on 15 November of that year, he was told by the Millwall doctors his body could not take it after a series of operations and injections. The pelvic injuries had taken too much out of him. He returned home disappointed, but finished his college course and for a while worked with Cork City in a marketing role before signing for Bray Wanderers in the League of Ireland First Division and making his Bray debut on the opening day of the 2004 League of Ireland season. During the following season, Grogan decided to retire because of his injuries.

In July 2006, Grogan decided to make one last attempt to resurrect his career. He went to Belgium to undergo three major surgeries and intense functional rehabilitation for eight months in Antwerp, after which he was offered a pay-as-you-play deal with St Patrick's Athletic to give himself a chance to gain match fitness before attempting to return to England to play. He made his league debut as a substitute for St Pats on 1 September 2006 in a 1–0 defeat to Waterford United Unfortunately his pelvic injury returned once again.

In January 2007 Grogan signed for Glentoran but only lasted one league game as his injuries returned to haunt him. This was his last top-flight game.

In June 2007 he was appointed Director of Under Age Development at his first club Belvedere

Kevin is currently in the United States of America, where he is pursuing his coaching and management career. Kevin is currently Technical Director of Clarkstown Soccer Club along with being the Head coach/Manager of the Women's and Men's adult teams in the National A League. He is also the owner and President of Kevin Grogan Soccer which is a private coaching company.

Kevin was awarded the New York Top 40 Under 40 award for his contribution to Soccer in New York.

== Honours ==
Republic of Ireland

- UEFA European Under-16 Championship: 1998
