= Leovan O'Garro =

Montserratian footballer

Personal information
- Date of birth: 26 June 1987 (age 39)
- Place of birth: Plymouth, Montserrat
- Position: Midfielder

Team information
- Current team: Foxfield United

Senior career*
Years	Team	Apps	(Gls)
- Foxfield United

International career^{‡}
2010–	Montserrat	7	(0)
- * Club domestic league appearances and goals as of 24 June 2011 ‡ National team caps and goals as of 24 June 2011

Leovan O'Garro (born 26 June 1987) is a Montserratian international footballer who plays for Irish club Foxfield United, as a midfielder.

== Career ==
O'Garro made his international debut for Montserrat on 6 October 2010. He has seven caps to date, including in one FIFA World Cup qualifying match.
