= Tony O'Dowd =

Irish footballer

Personal information
- Full name: Anthony O'Dowd
- Date of birth: 6 July 1970 (age 56)
- Place of birth: Dublin, Ireland
- Position: Goalkeeper

Senior career*
Years	Team	Apps	(Gls)
1989–1990	Shelbourne	?	(0)
1990–1992	Leeds United	0	(0)
1992	→ Kilkenny City (loan)	2	(0)
1992–1995	St. Patrick's Athletic	138	(0)
1995–1998	Derry City	120	(0)
1998–2003	Shamrock Rovers	124	(0)
2004–2005	Drogheda United	9	(0)
2006	Malahide United		
2007	Shelbourne	25	(0)
Total		?	(0)

International career
1989–1991	Republic of Ireland U21	4	(0)
- * Club domestic league appearances and goals

Tony O'Dowd (born 6 July 1970) is an Irish retired footballer who played as a goalkeeper. He is currently head coach of Ballyfermot United.

== Career ==
O'Dowd made his League of Ireland debut for Shelbourne on the opening day of the 1990-91 League of Ireland season.

The 2007 season marked O'Dowd's second spell with Shelbourne, having started his league career with where he won his first under 21 international cap before being signed by Leeds United. He returned from Leeds and played with Kilkenny City, St. Patrick's Athletic, Derry City, Shamrock Rovers, Drogheda United and Malahide United before returning to the Reds. In the 2007 Season with Shelbourne, O'Dowd made 25 league appearances and delivered many impressive displays. Despite impressing in his second spell at Tolka Park, O'Dowd was released by Shelbourne at the end of the 2007 season.

At Derry O'Dowd was sent off against PFC Lokomotiv Sofia in the 1995-96 UEFA Cup Winners' Cup.

O'Dowd made his Rovers debut keeping a clean sheet against his old club in September 1998.

He signed for Drogheda in January 2004.

Tony played one game for his work team, Pfizer Pfootball Pfive, in a 5-a-side tournament in Tallaght. After not conceding during the game, he then again retired.

== Personal life ==
O'Dowd's father also Tony played in goal for St Patrick's Athletic and Dundalk in the 1960s.

His brother Greg played for Rovers in the late 90s. He also played for Coleraine F.C. where he scored in the 1997-98 UEFA Cup.

In May 1997 tragedy hit the O'Dowd family when Tony's 18-year-old brother Conor died while training with his two brothers. O'Dowd did not play in the 1997 FAI Cup Final following the incident.
