= Chris Mulhall =

Irish footballer

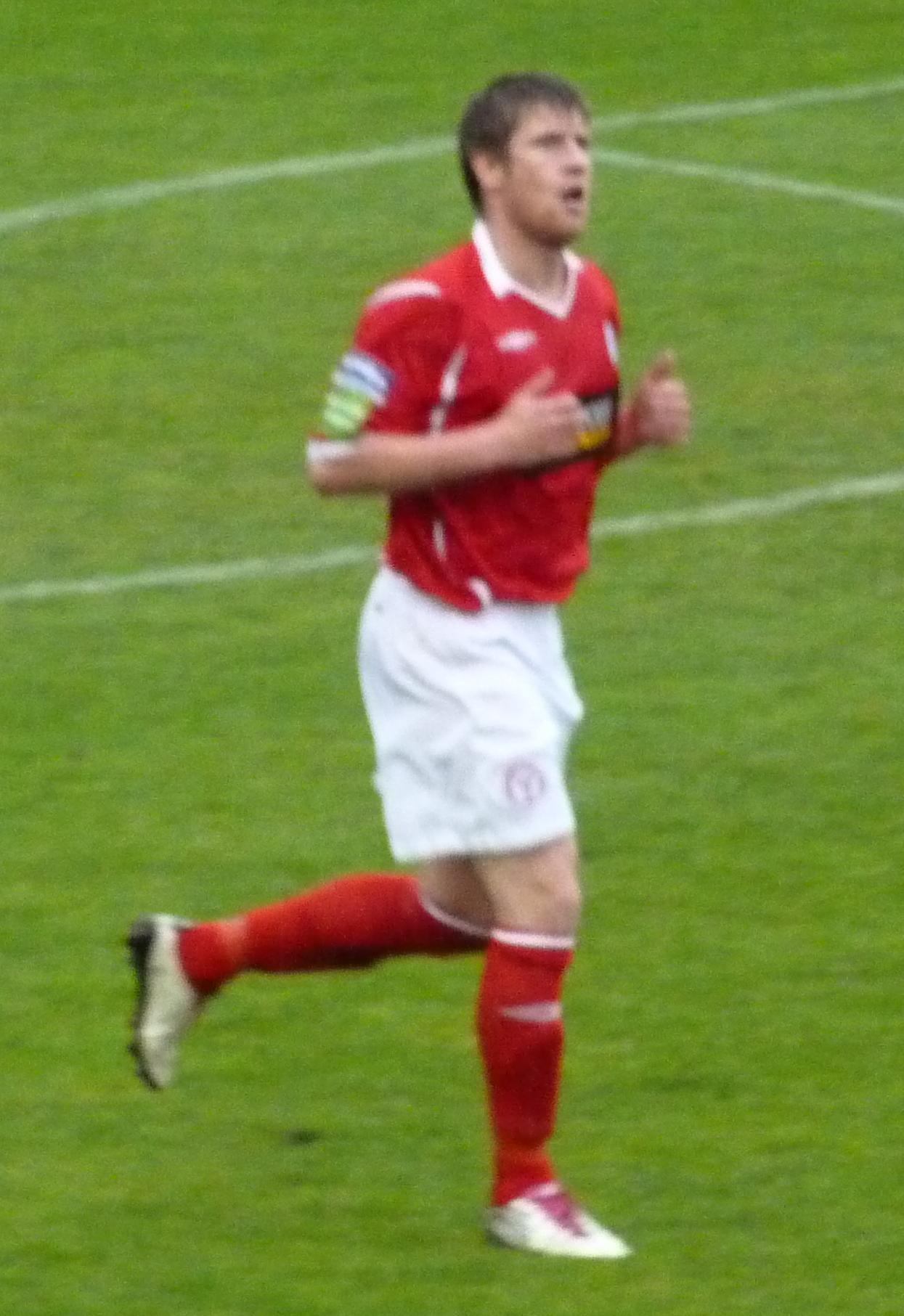

Personal information
- Date of birth: 9 February 1988 (age 38)
- Place of birth: Portlaoise, Ireland
- Position: Forward

Youth career
- Shelbourne

Senior career*
Years	Team	Apps	(Gls)
2005–2007	Shelbourne	1	(0)
2007–2008	Shamrock Rovers	6	(0)
2009–2010	UCD	60	(9)
2011	Shelbourne	20	(2)
2012–2015	UCD	64	(7)
2016–2017	Limerick	40	(13)
2017	Drogheda United	7	(2)
2018	Longford Town	18	(7)

International career^{‡}
2006	Republic of Ireland U18	2	(0)
- * Club domestic league appearances and goals as of 22:40, 31 July 2018 (UTC) ‡ National team caps and goals as of 8 February 2006

Chris Mulhall (born 9 February 1988) is an Irish footballer.

== Career ==
=== Shelbourne ===
Portlaoise native Mulhall began his senior career with Shelbourne where he became a prominent figure in their Under 21 panel for two seasons. In 2006 Mulhall was capped twice for the Republic of Ireland at U18 level in two friendlies against Malta. Following Shelbourne's demotion to the League of Ireland First Division Mulhall was promoted to Shelbourne's first team squad. He made his Shelbourne debut on 16 March 2007 in a 2–1 loss to Finn Harps at Finn Park. This would turn out to be his only first team appearance for Shelbourne.

=== Shamrock Rovers ===
Mulhall departed Shelbourne in the summer of 2007 when he joined Shamrock Rovers. He made his senior debut for Shamrock Rovers on 5 October 2007 against Cork City and made 6 appearances during the remainder of the 2007 season for Rovers. A series of injuries hampered Mulhall's development during the following season where he was unable to make a single first team appearance for Shamrock Rovers.

=== UCD ===
Mulhall was released by Shamrock Rovers following the 2008 season but he immediately signed for UCD ahead of the Student's First Division campaign in 2009. Mulhall overcame his injury problems the previous season to make 34 appearances and score 7 goals in all competitions for UCD as the Students took the First Division title and automatic promotion. He remained with UCD for their 2010 Premier Division campaign making 36 apps and scoring 4 goals in total while helping UCD to a respectable 7th-place finish. Mulhall also helped UCD to the 2010 A Championship title following their 2–1 victory over Bohemians A on 1 November 2010.

=== Return to Shelbourne ===
Following cutbacks at UCD ahead of the 2011 season Mulhall became a free agent. On 14 December 2010, Mulhall returned to Shelbourne ahead of the 2011 First Division season.

=== UCD & Limerick F.C. ===
After a second spell with UCD which included playing in the UEFA Europa League qualifying rounds, Mulhall made his first move out of the capital to sign for Limerick F.C. on 1 December 2015. He played an important role in his first season at Limerick and earned a league winner's medal as the club returned to the top flight as 2016 first division champions. With the signing of Rodrigo Tosi however, Mulhall found his first-team opportunities limited in 2017 and left the club mid-season.

=== Drogheda United ===
Mulhall then joined struggling Premier Division side Drogheda United, but was unable to help the club turn their fortunes round, and Drogheda were relegated at the end of the season.

=== Longford Town ===
Following the brief stint at Drogheda, Mulhall signed for Longford Town in November 2017 ahead of the 2018 season.

== Career statistics ==
As of match played on 13 April 2018

Appearances and goals by club, season and competition
Club	Season	League			Cup		League Cup		Other		Total	
Club	Season	Division	Apps	Goals	Apps	Goals	Apps	Goals	Apps	Goals	Apps	Goals
UCD	2009	League of Ireland First Division	15	6	0	0	—				15	6
UCD	2010	League of Ireland Premier Division	30	3	0	0	—				30	3
UCD	Total		45	9	0	0	0	0	0	0	45	9
Shelbourne	2011	League of Ireland First Division	20	2	1	0	2	0	—		23	2
UCD	2012	League of Ireland Premier Division	13	0	0	0	1	0	—		14	0
UCD	2014	League of Ireland Premier Division	30	3	0	0	1	0	2 (Note: Appearance(s) in Promotion/relegation playoff)	0	33	3
UCD	2015	League of Ireland First Division	21	4	0	0	1	0	4 (Note: Appearance(s) in UEFA Europa League)	0	26	4
UCD	Total		64	7	0	0	3	0	6	0	73	7
Limerick	2016	League of Ireland First Division	27	12	0	0	3	0	—		30	12
Limerick	2017	League of Ireland Premier Division	13	1	0	0	—				13	1
Limerick	Total		40	13	0	0	3	0	0	0	43	13
Drogheda United	2017	League of Ireland Premier Division	7	2	0	0	—				7	2
Longford Town	2018	League of Ireland First Division	18	7	0	0	—				18	7
Career totals			194	40	1	0	8	0	6	0	209	40

== Honours ==
UCD

- League of Ireland First Division (1): 2009
- League of Ireland A Championship (1): 2010

Limerick

- League of Ireland First Division (1): 2016
