= Joe Lawless =

Irish footballer

Personal information
- Date of birth: 13 February 1962 (age 64)
- Place of birth: Dublin, Ireland
- Position: Striker

Youth career
- 1976–1978: Shamrock Rovers
- 1978–1985: Cherry Orchard F.C.

Senior career*
Years	Team	Apps	(Gls)
1985–1987	Bray Wanderers	23	(5)
1987–1989	Bohemians	55	(11)
1989–1991	St Patrick's Athletic	52	(9)
1991–1994	Bohemians	65	(11)
1993–1994	→ Omagh Town (loan)	5	(0)
1993–1995	Derry City	34	(5)
1995–1997	Waterford United	27	(4)
Total		261	(45)
- * Club domestic league appearances and goals

Joe Lawless (born 13 February 1962) is an Irish former footballer who was active during the 1980s and 1990s.

Lawless was a forward who represented Bray Wanderers, St Patrick's Athletic, Bohemians (2 spells), Derry City F.C. and Waterford United during his career in the League of Ireland. He also had a spell in the Irish League on loan to Omagh Town. He is one of a select few to have won both the FAI Junior Cup (with Cherry Orchard F.C.) and the FAI Senior Cup.

He went to Glenmalure Park at the U17 level and spent two seasons in the reserves under Eamon Dunphy. Frustrated at his lack of opportunities he moved back to Cherry Orchard.

He moved into the League of Ireland ranks in January 1986 when he moved from Orchard to Bray Wanderers. He made his League of Ireland debut for Bray on 19 January scoring in a 2–1 win away to EMFA He made 5 appearances in the league that season as Bray clinched promotion to the Premier Division. After 2 seasons with Wanderers, he moved to Dalymount Park and Bohemians in 1987. He was on the move once again in 1989 when he moved to St. Pats where he picked a League winners medal that season.

He returned to Bohs for a 2nd spell in 1991 and helped to a FAI Cup victory that season. He scored 9 times in 31 league appearances that season for the "Gypsies" – his best ever scoring return. After a loan spell at Omagh at the beginning of the 1993/94 season, Joe headed to the Brandywell and signed for Derry City in October 1993. He picked up another winners medal that season by winning the League Cup. However, he was soon on the move once again when he signed for Waterford United and narrowly missed out on collecting the only domestic medal he hadn't got when his old club Bray beat Waterford in the final of the 1995 League of Ireland First Division Shield.

== Sources ==
- Dave Galvin; Gerry Desmond. Irish Football Handbook. ISBN 0-9517987-3-1.
- St Patrick's Athletic v Shamrock Rovers programme 27 August 1999
