= Mark Leech =

Irish footballer (born 1985)

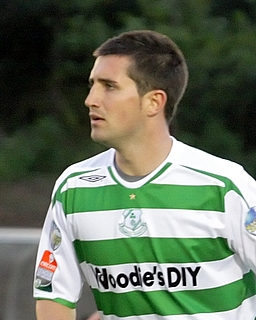

Personal information
- Date of birth: 9 December 1985 (age 40)
- Place of birth: Dublin, Ireland
- Position: Forward

Youth career
- Belvedere

Senior career*
Years	Team	Apps	(Gls)
2003–2004	UCD	4	(1)
2004–2007	Drogheda United	26	(4)
2006	→ Bohemians (loan)	7	(1)
2007	→ Shelbourne (loan)	30	(12)
2008	Galway United	16	(1)
2008	Shamrock Rovers	14	(0)
2009	St. Patrick's Athletic	9	(2)
2010	Shelbourne	20	(4)
2011–2012	Southern Stars	33	(11)
2013	Shelbourne	19	(2)

International career
2007	Republic of Ireland U21	1	(0)
- * Club domestic league appearances and goals

Mark Leech (born 9 December 1985) is an Irish footballer who played for various clubs in the League of Ireland including St Patrick's Athletic, Drogheda and Shamrock Rovers and is the son of former Shamrock Rovers and Republic of Ireland international Mick Leech.

== Career ==
After making a name for himself as an up-and-coming talent at youth level and as part of the FAIS International squad, Leech began his senior footballing career after being snapped up by UCD in 2003 for a deferred scholarship while he was still at school. He played on numerous occasions for the students' Under 21 panel and broke into the UCD first team making limited appearances. Leech scored his only UCD goal against Waterford United at Belfield Park on 22 September 2003 aged just 17.

Leech departed UCD during the 2004 season before he was due to begin his scholarship to sign for Drogheda United in July 2004, the club of his former boss at UCD Paul Doolin. He fought his way into the Drogheda United first team with numerous impressive displays for their Under 21 side. As one of the Drogs most impressive young talents, Leech was capped for Republic of Ireland Under 21s for the first time coming on as a second-half substitute in Ireland's 1–0 victory over Sweden at Drogheda's United Park on 28 February 2006. He further excelled his ever growing profile by scoring an extra-time winner for Drogheda United in the 2006 Setanta Sports Cup Final against Cork City at Tolka Park on 22 April 2006. He was shortly loaned to Bohemians in July 2006 until the end of the season as part of Tony Grant's permanent move in the opposite direction.

After being transfer listed by Drogheda United at the end of the 2006 season, Leech signed for Shelbourne in February 2007 on a season long loan. There was considerable angst for Leech at the start of his Shels career as he was prohibited from playing for Shels by FIFA along with many other Eircom League players due to FIFA's two-club ruling. After receiving clearance to play for Shelbourne by FIFA, he made his Shelbourne league debut on 30 March 2007 against Kilkenny City at Buckley Park where he scored on his debut in a 1–1 draw. Leech was a regular figure for Shelbourne during the 2007 season making 32 league and cup appearances and scoring 12 goals making him Shelbourne's top goalscorer for the 2007 season. Leech's loan spell at Shelbourne ended at the end of the 2007 season. He signed for Galway United in December 2007 but his spell at Terryland Park only lasted 6 months.

Leech signed for Shamrock Rovers on 3 July 2008; he made his Hoops debut the following day as a substitute against Cobh Ramblers. Leech released by Shamrock Rovers at the end of the 2008 season but he was later signed by St. Patrick's Athletic before the start of the 2009 season. Leech made an impressive start to his Pats career scoring twice in his first four games before suffering a broken leg against Dundalk on 27 March 2009. After a number of months out of action Leech returned to fitness but struggled to regain his position in the Saint's starting XI. He parted company with St. Patrick's Athletic at the end of 2009 and he re-joined former club Shelbourne on 25 March 2010.
