= Dave Henderson (footballer) =

Irish footballer

Personal information
- Date of birth: 11 June 1960 (age 66)
- Place of birth: Dublin, Ireland
- Position: Goalkeeper

Youth career
- Stella Maris

Senior career*
Years	Team	Apps	(Gls)
1978–1981	Shamrock Rovers	35	(0)
1979	→ Toronto Blizzard (loan)	7	(0)
1981	→ Vancouver Whitecaps (loan)	3	(0)
1981–1984	St. Patrick's Athletic	59	(0)
1984–1986	Home Farm	38	(0)
1986–1987	Drogheda United	16	(0)
1987–1991	St. Patrick's Athletic	104	(1)
1991–1992	Shamrock Rovers	31	(0)
1992–1998	Bohemians	140	(0)

International career
1979	Republic of Ireland U-21	2	(0)
- * Club domestic league appearances and goals

Dave Henderson (born 11 June 1960) is an Irish former professional football goalkeeper who played in the League of Ireland from 1978 until his retirement in 1998. He also played two seasons in the North American Soccer League.

== Career ==
In 1978, Henderson began his career with Shamrock Rovers. Mainly a reserve goalkeeper, he made his League of Ireland debut on 25 April 1978 and impressed enough to be called into the Republic of Ireland under-21 national football team, earning two caps in 1979. Also in 1979, Henderson spent his summer on loan to the Toronto Blizzard of the North American Soccer League. Henderson returned to Shamrock Rovers and soon established himself in the first team. From 1977 to 1981 he made 35 league appearances, keeping 20 clean sheets. He also played one game in the UEFA Cup Winners' Cup.

In 1981, Johnny Giles signed him for the Vancouver Whitecaps and he helped them win the Northwest Division, before losing in the play-off first-round game to Tampa Bay Rowdies.

On returning to Ireland, Henderson joined St. Patrick's Athletic, making his debut against Home Farm on 22 November 1981. He won his first trophy, the Leinster Senior Cup in December 1982. Teammate Paul McGrath later said that "Henderson was as good a goalkeeper as I've played in front of". Henderson signed for Home Farm F.C. in November 1984, spending two uneventful seasons before signing for Drogheda United in 1986. Throughout the 1980s, Henderson had been a regular member of the League of Ireland XI squad. When the FAI were asked by the Olympic Council of Ireland to put forward a team to attempt qualification for the 1988 Olympic Games, Henderson would add Olympic caps to his league and U21 honours.

In 1987 Henderson was signed by Brian Kerr for his second spell with St. Patrick's Athletic. In his first year back, St. Pats finished in second place. Two years later they went one better, winning the club's first League of Ireland championship in thirty-four years. A feature of Henderson's time with St. Pats would be his enforced absence from game due to work commitments. Henderson was a full-time fireman and often called away at short notice. In 1990/91 he added a further Leinster Senior Cup medal and a Presidents Cup winners medal (where he saved three penalties in the deciding penalty shoot-out. Unfortunately for St. Pats they hit a severe financial crisis and most of their championship winning team left. Henderson joined Mick Moody and John McDonnell in joining Shamrock Rovers. In September 2009, Henderson was inducted into the St. Pats hall of fame.

Henderson stayed with Shamrock Rovers for only season, making 31 appearances and keeping 14 clean sheets, before joining crosstown rivals Bohemians where he played in every league game and finished top of the league table in his first season, 1992–93 League of Ireland Premier Division. However, as the League rules stated a title could not be won on goal difference, Bohemians were forced into a play-off with Shelbourne and Cork City, with Cork coming out on top after 9 games. Henderson would continue to play for Bohemians until his retirement in 1998. His last game was a 1–0 win over Finn Harps on 22 February 1998. He came close to adding another title in 1995/96 before eventually losing out to St. Patrick's Athletic.

Since retiring as a player, Henderson has worked as a scout or a coach for Aston Villa, Derry City, Bohemians and Hibernian.

== Personal ==
Henderson is a member of an Irish goalkeeping dynasty. His father, Paddy Henderson, played for Shamrock Rovers in the 1960s, winning the FAI Cup in 1962. His brother Stephen played and managed in League of Ireland football and another brother, Wayne, played for the Republic of Ireland. His son Sam owns an Irish pub in Karlsruhe, Germany.

== Honours ==
- League of Ireland
  - St Patrick's Athletic – 1990
- Leinster Senior Cup
  - St Patrick's Athletic – 1983, 1991, 1993
- LFA President's Cup
  - St Patrick's Athletic – 1991
