= Kyle Moran =

Irish footballer

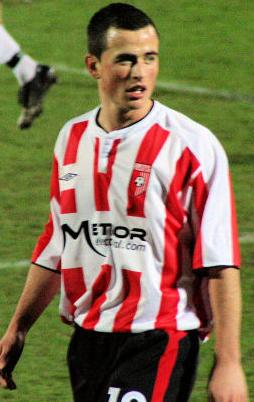
- Moran playing for Derry City

Personal information
- Date of birth: 7 June 1987 (age 39)
- Place of birth: Dundalk, Ireland
- Position: Forward

Team information
- Current team: Perth SC

Youth career
- Shelbourne
- Manchester United

Senior career*
Years	Team	Apps	(Gls)
2007	Derry City	0	(0)
2007	→ Shelbourne (loan)	9	(1)
2007	Larne	?	(?)
2008	Institute	?	(?)
2008	Newry City	?	(?)
2009	St Patrick's Athletic	15	(2)
2010–	Perth SC		
- * Club domestic league appearances and goals

Kyle Moran (born 7 June 1987) is an Irish footballer who plays as a forward for Perth SC in the NPL Western Australia.

Moran played with Manchester United in his teens but was later released in 2006. Prior to the kick-off of the 2007 League of Ireland season, Moran, aged 19, was invited for a trial at Derry City. After impressing manager, Pat Fenlon, he signed for the club on 5 February 2007. Under a month later, he was offered on loan to a Shelbourne side in dire need of players for the beginning of the 2007 season due to serious financial problems at the club. Whilst helping out a fellow league-team, it was also hoped by Derry City that the move would aid Moran's fitness and development.

On 27 April 2007, Moran scored his first goal for Shelbourne against Limerick 37, finishing well after good work from James Chambers. He returned to the Derry City at the end of June but was released after the departure of Pat Fenlon from the Derry job. After a short trial with Bohemians in August 2007, Moran signed a one-year contract with Northern Irish club Larne just before the transfer deadline for the 2007–08 season. In January 2008, just six months into his contract with Larne, Moran joined Institute. However, he was on the move again at the start of the 2008–09 season, moving to Newry City.

After a contract dispute with Newry City Moran resigned after 6 months with the club. Prior to the kick-off of the 2009 League of Ireland season he signed a full-time contract with St.Patricks Athletic F.C after impressing manager Jeff Kenna on trial. He scored his first goal for the club on 27 March at Richmond Park against hometown club Dundalk.

Moran is now an Estate Agent for Stirling Ackroyd in East London.
