= Kevin Dawson (footballer, born 1990) =

Irish footballer

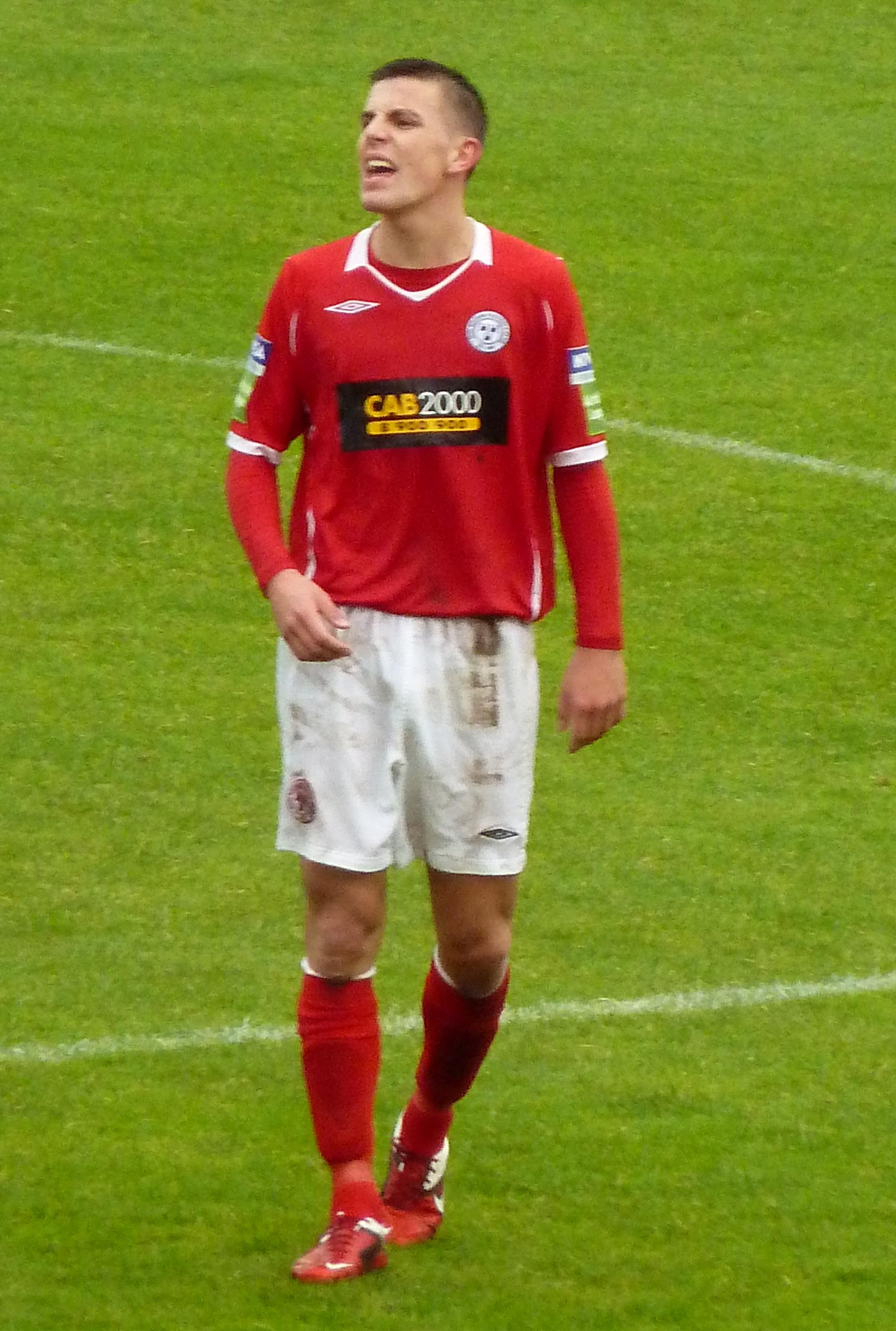
- Dawson playing for Shelbourne in 2011

Personal information
- Full name: Kevin Patrick Dawson
- Date of birth: 30 June 1990 (age 36)
- Place of birth: Dublin, Ireland
- Height: 1.79 m (5 ft 10 in)
- Position: Midfielder

Youth career
- Belvedere
- Shelbourne
- St. Kevins Boys

Senior career*
Years	Team	Apps	(Gls)
2009–2011	Sporting Fingal	15	(0)
2011–2012	Shelbourne	49	(4)
2013–2017	Yeovil Town	121	(6)
2017–2019	Cheltenham Town	66	(9)
2019–2020	Forest Green Rovers	15	(0)
2020–2023	Gloucester City	58	(4)
2023	→ Torquay United (loan)	13	(0)
2023–2024	Torquay United	9	(0)
2024–2025	Gloucester City	34	(0)
Total		380	(23)

International career
2005	Republic of Ireland U15		
2006	Republic of Ireland U16		
2008	Republic of Ireland U18	2	(0)
- * Club domestic league appearances and goals

Kevin Patrick Dawson (born 30 June 1990) is a retired Irish footballer who played as a midfielder.

== Career ==
=== Sporting Fingal ===
Following his schoolboy years at St Malachys FC and both Belvedere and St. Kevin's Boys, Dublin-born Dawson joined Sporting Fingal in 2009. Initially part of their Under–20 squad, Dawson forced his way into Fingal's first team picture making 4 appearances during the 2009 First Division season. Dawson won an FAI Cup winners medal in 2009 as an unused substitute during Sporting's Fingal's 2–1 victory over Sligo Rovers. Following Sporting Fingal's promotion to the Premier Division for 2010, the young midfielder made a further 16 league and cup appearances and won a 2010 A Championship Cup medal as part of their reserve side. Ahead of the 2011 season, Dawson was still under contract at Sporting Fingal but following the pre-season demise of the club Dawson was left without a club.

=== Shelbourne ===
On 14 February 2011, Dawson was snapped up Shelbourne for their 2011 First Division campaign. He became more of a permanent fixture halfway through the season where he helped Shels gain promotion to the Premier League. He received praise for his performance in the 2011 FAI Cup Final against Sligo Rovers. Shelbourne would eventually lose on penalties, Dawson being one of the players to miss from the spot.

=== Yeovil Town ===
Dawson signed for English League One side Yeovil Town following the expiry of his Shelbourne contract upon the opening of the 2013 January transfer window, signing a contract until the end of the 2012–13 season. On 8 January 2013, Dawson made his Yeovil debut as a substitute in their Football League Trophy area semi-final defeat against Leyton Orient. On 19 May 2013, Dawson played in the 2013 League One play-off final as Yeovil beat Brentford 2–1 to secure promotion to the Football League Championship. On 26 June 2013, Dawson signed a two-year contract extension.

=== Cheltenham Town ===
On 17 May 2017, Dawson rejected the offer of a new contract at Yeovil, and signed for fellow League Two side Cheltenham Town on a two-year deal.

=== Forest Green Rovers ===
On 1 July 2019, Dawson rejected the offer of a new contract from Cheltenham Town to sign for League Two rivals Forest Green Rovers on an initial one-year deal. At the end of the 2019–20 season, Dawson was released by Forest Green Rovers.

=== Gloucester City ===
On 10 September 2020, Dawson signed for National League North club Gloucester City.

=== Torquay United ===
On 4 March 2023, Dawson joined Torquay United on loan for the remainder of the season.

He made the move permanent following the side's relegation at the end of the 2022–23 season.

=== Gloucester City ===
On 5 June 2024, Dawson returned to Gloucester City following their relegation to the Southern Football League Premier Division South.

== Personal life ==
His eldest brother Stephen has played in the English Football League for Mansfield Town, Bury, Leyton Orient, Barnsley, Rochdale and Scunthorpe United.

Another brother Brendan played youth football for Shamrock Rovers and made one first team substitute appearance for Rovers in 2005.

== Career statistics ==
Appearances and goals by club, season and competition
Club	Season	League			National Cup (Note: Includes FAI Cup, FA Cup)		League Cup (Note: Includes League of Ireland Cup, EFL Cup)		Other		Total	
Club	Season	Division	Apps	Goals	Apps	Goals	Apps	Goals	Apps	Goals	Apps	Goals
Sporting Fingal	2009	First Division	4	0	0	0	0	0	0	0	4	0
Sporting Fingal	2010	Premier Division	11	0	1	0	1	0	3 (Note: Appearance(s) in the Leinster Senior Cup)	1	16	1
Sporting Fingal	Total		15	0	1	0	1	0	3	1	20	1
Shelbourne	2011	First Division	25	2	6	1	1	0	1	0	33	3
Shelbourne	2012	Premier Division	24	2	6	0	2	0	2	0	34	2
Shelbourne	Total		49	4	12	1	3	0	3	0	67	5
Yeovil Town	2012–13	League One	20	2	0	0	0	0	4 (Note: Three appearances and one goal in the League One play-offs, one appearance in the Football League Trophy)	1	24	3
Yeovil Town	2013–14	Championship	35	1	1	0	2	1	—		38	2
Yeovil Town	2014–15	League One	17	1	3	0	0	0	1 (Note: Appearance(s) in the EFL Trophy)	0	21	1
Yeovil Town	2015–16	League Two	10	0	1	0	0	0	0	0	11	0
Yeovil Town	2016–17	League Two	39	2	2	0	2	0	4	1	47	3
Yeovil Town	Total		121	6	7	0	4	1	9	2	141	9
Cheltenham Town	2017–18	League Two	34	5	1	1	1	0	1	0	37	6
Cheltenham Town	2018–19	League Two	32	4	0	0	1	0	2	1	35	5
Cheltenham Town	Total		66	9	1	1	2	0	3	1	72	11
Forest Green Rovers	2019–20	League Two	15	0	1	0	1	0	2	0	19	0
Gloucester City	2020–21	National League North	17	2	1	0	—		3 (Note: Appearances in the FA Trophy)	1	21	3
Gloucester City	2021–22	National League North	37	2	1	0	—		2	0	40	2
Gloucester City	2022–23	National League North	4	0	0	0	—		0	0	4	0
Gloucester City	Total		58	4	2	0	—		5	1	65	5
Torquay United (loan)	2022–23	National League	13	0	—		—		—		13	0
Torquay United	2023–24	National League South	9	0	0	0	—		0	0	9	0
Gloucester City	2024–25	Southern League; Premier Division South	34	0	3	0	—		4 (Note: Two appearances in FA Trophy, two appearances in Southern League Premier Division South play-offs)	0	41	0
Career total			380	23	27	2	11	0	29	5	447	30

== Honours ==
Sporting Fingal

- FAI Cup: 2009

Yeovil Town

- Football League One play-offs: 2013
