= 2010 Shamrock Rovers F.C. season =

Shamrock Rovers F.C.
2010 season
- Chairman: (Republic of Ireland) Jonathan Roche
- Coach: (Northern Ireland) Michael O'Neill
- Premier Division: Champions
- FAI Cup: Final
- League of Ireland Cup: Semifinals
- Leinster Senior Cup: Quarterfinals
- Europa League: Third qualifying round
- Top goalscorer: League: Gary Twigg; All: Gary Twigg
Home colours	Away colours	Third colours

The 2010 Shamrock Rovers F.C. season was the club's 89th season competing in the League of Ireland and the team's second season under the stewardship of Michael O'Neill. The team finished the season as Premier Division champions, narrowly beating rivals Bohemians to the title by virtue of a better goal difference.

Gary Twigg concluded the season as the league's top goalscorer for the second season in succession. The Hoops reached the 2010 FAI Cup Final, the semifinals of the 2010 League of Ireland Cup, the quarterfinals of the 2010 Leinster Senior Cup and defeated Bnei Yehuda Tel Aviv F.C. in the second qualifying round of the UEFA Europa League before losing to Juventus in the next round.

The team played a direct style of football throughout the season, with Michael O'Neill generally employing the 4–5–1 formation.

== Preseason ==
The club made a number of signings during the off-season and preseason in an effort to strengthen the squad. Enda Stevens and James Chambers were signed at the end of 2009, the former agreeing to a one-year contract. They were joined by Chris Turner, Craig Walsh and Billy Dennehy in January 2010, while Dan Murray and Danny Murphy signed for the club in February. The signing of Chris Turner was disputed by Sligo Rovers and eventually sanctioned in March. The team played four preseason friendlies, winning three and drawing one.

== Squad ==
All players used during the season:

Note: Flags indicate national team as defined under FIFA eligibility rules; some limited exceptions apply. Players may hold more than one non-FIFA nationality.

No.	Pos.	Nation	Player
1	GK	NIR	Alan Mannus
2	DF	IRL	Patrick Sullivan
3	DF	IRL	Enda Stevens
4	DF	SCO	Craig Sives
5	DF	IRL	Aidan Price
6	MF	IRL	Stephen Rice
7	MF	IRL	Stephen Bradley
8	MF	IRL	James Chambers
9	FW	SCO	Gary Twigg
10	FW	IRL	Dessie Baker
11	MF	IRL	Ollie Cahill
11	FW	ENG	Neale Fenn
13	DF	IRL	Pat Flynn
14	FW	IRL	Graham Barrett

No.	Pos.	Nation	Player
14	MF	IRL	Aidan Downes
15	MF	IRL	Paddy Kavanagh
16	GK	IRL	Robert Duggan
16	GK	ENG	Pat Jennings
17	MF	IRL	Seán O'Connor
18	MF	NIR	Chris Turner
19	DF	ENG	Danny Murphy
20	MF	IRL	Billy Dennehy
21	MF	IRL	Craig Walsh
22	FW	IRL	Don Cowan
23	FW	NIR	Thomas Stewart
24	DF	ENG	Dan Murray
25	MF	IRL	Robert Bayly

=== Out on loan ===
All players loaned out during the season:

Note: Flags indicate national team as defined under FIFA eligibility rules; some limited exceptions apply. Players may hold more than one non-FIFA nationality.

No.	Pos.	Nation	Player
21	MF	IRL	Craig Walsh (at Longford Town)
22	FW	IRL	Don Cowan (at Longford Town)

=== Transfers ===
All players transferred during the season:

Note: Flags indicate national team as defined under FIFA eligibility rules; some limited exceptions apply. Players may hold more than one non-FIFA nationality.

No.	Pos.	Nation	Player
11	FW	ENG	Neale Fenn (Signed in August)
14	MF	IRL	Aidan Downes (Signed in August)
16	GK	ENG	Pat Jennings (Signed in July)
23	FW	NIR	Thomas Stewart (Signed in April)
25	MF	IRL	Robert Bayly (Signed in March)

No.	Pos.	Nation	Player
11	MF	IRL	Ollie Cahill (Released in July)
14	FW	IRL	Graham Barrett (Retired in September)
16	GK	IRL	Robert Duggan (Transferred to Drogheda in July)

== Technical staff ==
- Coach: Michael O'Neill
- Assistant coach: Trevor Croly
- Goalkeeping coach: Tim Dalton
- Physiotherapist: Albert Byrne

== Premier Division ==
=== Matches ===
Win Draw Loss

6 March Round 1	Sligo Rovers	1–1	Shamrock Rovers	The Showgrounds, Sligo
19:45 IWT	Eoin Doyle 22'	(Report)	James Chambers 63'	Attendance: c. 3,000; Referee: Anthony Buttimer

16 March Round 2	Shamrock Rovers	0–2	St. Patrick's Athletic	Tallaght Stadium, Dublin
20:00 IWT		(Report)	Ian Bermingham 57'; Vinny Faherty 60'	Referee: Declan Hanney

21 March Round 3	Shamrock Rovers	0–2	Dundalk	Tallaght Stadium, Dublin
15:45 IWT		(Report)	Neale Fenn 35'; Stephen Maher 48'	Referee: Paul Tuite

26 March Round 4	Galway United	0–1	Shamrock Rovers	Terryland Park, Galway
19:35 IWT		(Report)	Pat Sullivan 7'

2 April Round 5	Shamrock Rovers	0–0	UCD	Tallaght Stadium, Dublin
20:00 IST		(Report)		Referee: Richie Winter

5 April Round 6	Sporting Fingal	1–1	Shamrock Rovers	Morton Stadium, Dublin
15:00 IST	Conan Byrne 78'	(Report)	James Chambers 87'	Attendance: 1,440; Referee: Anthony Buttimer

9 April Round 7	Shamrock Rovers	1–0	Bohemians	Tallaght Stadium, Dublin
19:45 IST	Billy Dennehy 38'	(Report)		Referee: Alan Kelly

16 April Round 8	Drogheda United	0–2	Shamrock Rovers	Hunky Dorys Park, Drogheda
19:45 IST		(Report)	Robert Bayly 47'; Gary Twigg 93'	Referee: Anthony Buttimer

23 April Round 9	Shamrock Rovers	1–0	Bray Wanderers	Tallaght Stadium, Dublin
20:00 IST	Gary Twigg 36'	(Report)		Referee: Richie Winter

26 April Round 10	Shamrock Rovers	1–1	Sligo Rovers	Tallaght Stadium, Dublin
20:00 IST	Gary Twigg 6'	(Report)	Padraig Amond 36'	Attendance: 3,175; Referee: Damien Hancock

30 April Round 11	St. Patrick's Athletic	1–2	Shamrock Rovers	Richmond Park, Dublin
19:45 IST	Alex Williams 90'	(Report)	Thomas Stewart 36' 59'	Referee: David McKeon

3 May Round 12	Dundalk	2–1	Shamrock Rovers	Oriel Park, Dundalk
19:45 IST	Neale Fenn 52'; John Melligan 55'	(Report)	Gary Twigg 65'	Referee: Damien Hancock

7 May Round 13	Shamrock Rovers	2–0	Galway United	Tallaght Stadium, Dublin
20:00 IST	Stephen Rice 49'; Dan Murray 69'	(Report)		Attendance: 3,417; Referee: Neil Doyle

14 May Round 14	UCD	1–2	Shamrock Rovers	UCD Bowl, Dublin
19:45 IST	Paul Corry 15'	(Report)	James Chambers 8'; Gary Twigg 86'	Referee: Declan Hanney

21 May Round 15	Shamrock Rovers	1–1	Sporting Fingal	Tallaght Stadium, Dublin
20:00 IST	James Chambers 86'	(Report)	Glen Crowe 88'	Referee: Alan Kelly

29 May Round 16	Bohemians	0–0	Shamrock Rovers	Dalymount Park, Dublin
13:00 IST		(Report)		Referee: David McKeon

8 June Round 17	Shamrock Rovers	1–1	Drogheda United	Tallaght Stadium, Dublin
20:00 IST	Robert Bayly 81'	(Report)	John Flood 67'	Referee: Neil Doyle

25 June Round 18	Bray Wanderers	0–0	Shamrock Rovers	Carlisle Grounds, Bray
19:45 IST		(Report)		Referee: Tom Connolly

2 July Round 19	Sligo Rovers	1–2	Shamrock Rovers	The Showgrounds, Sligo
19:45 IST	Eoin Doyle 23'	(Report)	Alan Keane 54' (o.g.); Chris Turner 61'	Referee: Richie Winter

5 July Round 20	Shamrock Rovers	2–1	St. Patrick's Athletic	Tallaght Stadium, Dublin
20:00 IST	Thomas Stewart 63' 81'	(Report)	Derek Doyle 50'	Referee: Alan Kelly

11 July Round 21	Shamrock Rovers	4–0	Dundalk	Tallaght Stadium, Dublin
16:00 IST	James Chambers 30' 60'; Gary Twigg 35' 36'	(Report)		Attendance: 3,309; Referee: David McKeon

18 July Round 22	Galway United	0–1	Shamrock Rovers	Terryland Park, Galway
20:05 IST		(Report)	Gary Twigg 62'	Referee: Damien Hancock

1 August Round 24	Sporting Fingal	3–3	Shamrock Rovers	Morton Stadium, Dublin
16:00 IST	Éamon Zayed 11'; Gary O'Neill 50'; Ronan Finn 87'	(Report)	Craig Sives 34'; Gary Twigg 76'; Stephen Rice 80'	Referee: Anthony Buttimer

8 August Round 25	Shamrock Rovers	3–0	Bohemians	Tallaght Stadium, Dublin
12:30 IST	Dan Murray 24'; Gary Twigg 63'; Billy Dennehy 85'	(Report)		Referee: David McKeon

13 August Round 26	Drogheda United	0–2	Shamrock Rovers	Hunky Dorys Park, Drogheda
19:45 IST		(Report)	Gary Twigg 68'; Billy Dennehy 71'	Referee: Anthony Buttimer

20 August Round 27	Shamrock Rovers	4–1	Bray Wanderers	Tallaght Stadium, Dublin
20:00 IST	Sean Houston 15' (o.g.); Stephen Rice 23'; Gary Twigg 27' 45'	(Report)	Gary Dempsey 88'	Attendance: 4,422; Referee: Damien Hancock

23 August Round 23	Shamrock Rovers	4–1	UCD	Tallaght Stadium, Dublin
20:00 IST	Stephen Bradley 5'; Billy Dennehy 43'; Gary Twigg 63'; Dan Murray 77'	(Report)	Ciarán Kilduff 26'	Attendance: 3,048; Referee: Neil Doyle

3 September Round 28	Shamrock Rovers	1–0	Sligo Rovers	Tallaght Stadium, Dublin
20:00 IST	Billy Dennehy 68'	(Report)		Attendance: 4,022; Referee: Alan Kelly

10 September Round 29	St. Patrick's Athletic	1–3	Shamrock Rovers	Richmond Park, Dublin
19:35 IST	Ryan Guy 2'	(Report)	Gary Twigg 45'; Thomas Stewart 56'; Billy Dennehy 63'	Referee: David McKeon

13 September Round 30	Dundalk	5–1	Shamrock Rovers	Oriel Park, Dundalk
19:45 IST	Tom Miller 3'; Fahrudin Kuduzović 16'; Matthew Tipton 27' 44' 83'	(Report)	Gary Twigg 60'	Referee: Tom Connolly

24 September Round 31	Shamrock Rovers	3–0	Galway United	Tallaght Stadium, Dublin
20:00 IST	Gary Twigg 10' 26'; Craig Sives 32'	(Report)		Referee: Tom Connolly

1 October Round 32	UCD	3–2	Shamrock Rovers	UCD Bowl, Dublin
19:45 IST	Ciarán Kilduff 33'; Brian Shortall 64'; Keith Ward 88'	(Report)	Gary Twigg 20'; Chris Turner 74'	Attendance: 1,986; Referee: Richie Winter

5 October Round 34	Bohemians	1–0	Shamrock Rovers	Dalymount Park, Dublin
19:05 IST	Jason Byrne 21'	(Report)		Referee: Alan Kelly

9 October Round 33	Shamrock Rovers	1–2	Sporting Fingal	Tallaght Stadium, Dublin
15:00 IST	Thomas Stewart 13'	(Report)	Gary O'Neill 87'; Glen Crowe 89'	Referee: Declan Hanney

22 October Round 35	Shamrock Rovers	2–0	Drogheda United	Tallaght Stadium, Dublin
20:00 IST	Thomas Stewart 51'; Gary Twigg 63'	(Report)		Attendance: 3,650; Referee: Declan Hanney

29 October Round 36	Bray Wanderers	2–2	Shamrock Rovers	Carlisle Grounds, Bray
19:45 IST	Jake Kelly 20'; Gary Shaw 69'	(Report)	Gary Twigg 41'; Thomas Stewart 46'	Referee: Alan Kelly

=== Final Table ===
Pos	Team	Pld	W	D	L	GF	GA	GD	Pts	Qualification or relegation
1	Shamrock Rovers (C)	36	19	10	7	57	34	+23	67	Qualification for Champions League second qualifying round
2	Bohemians	36	19	10	7	50	29	+21	67	Qualification for Europa League second qualifying round
3	Sligo Rovers	36	17	12	7	61	36	+25	63	Qualification for Europa League third qualifying round (Note: Sligo Rovers qualified for the UEFA Europa League third qualifying round after winning the 2010 FAI Cup Final.)
4	Sporting Fingal (R)	36	16	14	6	60	38	+22	62	Withdrew from league (Note: Sporting Fingal withdrew from League of Ireland due to financial difficulties shortly before the 2011 Premier Division season.)
5	St Patrick's Athletic	36	16	9	11	55	33	+22	57	Qualification for Europa League first qualifying round
6	Dundalk	36	14	6	16	46	50	−4	48	
7	UCD	36	11	8	17	47	54	−7	41	
8	Galway United (O)	36	9	11	16	38	59	−21	38	Qualification for relegation play-off
9	Bray Wanderers (O)	36	6	9	21	35	72	−37	27	Qualification for relegation play-off
10	Drogheda United	36	4	9	23	30	74	−44	21	Spared from relegation (Note: Drogheda United were originally relegated but retained their place in the Premier Division after Sporting Fingal withdrew.)

Rules for classification: 1) points; 2) goal difference; 3) number of goals scored.
(C) Champions; (O) Play-off winners; (R) Relegated

== Cups ==
=== FAI Cup ===
4 June Round 3	Shamrock Rovers	5–1	Wexford Youths	Tallaght Stadium, Dublin
20:00 IST	Dessie Baker 3'; Gary Twigg 30'; James Chambers 50' 72'; Chris Turner 70'	(Report)	Garry Sheahan 13'	Referee: Tom Connolly

27 August Round 4	Longford Town	1–2	Shamrock Rovers	Flancare Park, Longford
20:00 IST	John Lester 79'	(Report)	Chris Deans 54' (o.g.); Billy Dennehy 71'	Attendance: c. 1,000; Referee: Richie Winter

17 September Qrt. final	Shamrock Rovers	6–0	Galway United	Tallaght Stadium, Dublin
20:00 IST	Thomas Stewart 12'; Rhys Meynell 23' (o.g.); James Chambers 33' 65'; Seamus Conneely 66' (o.g.); Dessie Baker 77'	(Report)		Referee: Anthony Buttimer

17 October Semifinal	Shamrock Rovers	2–2	St. Patrick's Athletic	Tallaght Stadium, Dublin
15:15 IST	Chris Turner 16'; Gary Twigg 65'	(Report)	David McAllister 31'; Paddy Kavanagh 90' (o.g.)	Attendance: 5,165; Referee: Tom Connolly

19 October Semifinal Rpy.	St. Patrick's Athletic	0–1	Shamrock Rovers	Richmond Park, Dublin
19:45 IST		(Report)	Chris Turner 70'	Referee: Tom Connolly

14 November Final	Sligo Rovers	0–0 (a.e.t.) (2–0 p)	Shamrock Rovers	Aviva Stadium, Dublin
15:30 IWT		(Report)		Attendance: 36,101; Referee: Tom Connolly
	Penalties
	Eoin Doyle (penalty scored); Alan Keane (penalty missed); Conor O'Grady (penalty missed); Gary McCabe (penalty scored)		Gary Twigg (penalty missed); Pat Flynn (penalty missed); Chris Turner (penalty missed); Patrick Kavanagh (penalty missed)

=== League of Ireland Cup ===
10 May Round 2	UCD	0–1	Shamrock Rovers	UCD Bowl, Dublin
19:45 IST		(Report)	Gary Twigg 10'	Referee: Richie Winter

1 June Quarterfinal	Derry City	1–2	Shamrock Rovers	Brandywell, Derry
19:45 IST	Mark Farren 84'	(Report)	Gary Twigg 49'; Dessie Baker 58'	Referee: Declan Hanney

17 August Semifinal	Sligo Rovers	2–1	Shamrock Rovers	The Showgrounds, Sligo
19:45 IST	Pádraig Amond 18' 49'	(Report)	Gary Twigg 17'	Attendance: c. 2,300; Referee: Neil Doyle

=== Leinster Senior Cup ===
27 February Round 1	Shamrock Rovers	2–1	Wexford Youths	Tallaght Stadium, Dublin
19:00 IWT	Ollie Cahill 36'; Billy Dennehy 53'	(Report)	Danny Furlong 75'

19 April Quarterfinal	Shamrock Rovers	1–3	Shelbourne	Tallaght Stadium, Dublin
20:00 IST	Graham Barrett 58'	(Report)	Philip Gorman 9'; Adalberto Pinto 27'; Darren Forsyth 63'	Attendance: 850; Referee: Tom Connolly

=== UEFA Europa League ===
15 July Qualifying Rd 2	Shamrock Rovers	1–1	Bnei Yehuda	Tallaght Stadium, Dublin
20:00 IST	Robert Bayly 91'	(Report)	Omri Afek 26'	Attendance: 4,850; Referee: Mauro Bergonzi

22 July Qualifying Rd 2	Bnei Yehuda	0–1	Shamrock Rovers	Bloomfield Stadium, Tel Aviv
20:30 IDT		(Report)	Thomas Stewart 70'	Referee: Antony Gautier

29 July Qualifying Rd 3	Shamrock Rovers	0–2	Juventus	Tallaght Stadium, Dublin
19:45 IST		(Report)	Amauri 3' 75'	Attendance: c. 5,700; Referee: Fernandez Borbablan

5 August Qualifying Rd 3	Juventus	1–0	Shamrock Rovers	Stadio Alberto Braglia, Modena
20:45 CEST	Alessandro Del Piero 74'	(Report)		Referee: Georgios Daloukas
