= 2008 League of Ireland First Division =

League of Ireland First Division
- Season: 2008
- Champions: Dundalk
- Top goalscorer: Robbie Doyle: 16 (Sporting Fingal)

The 2008 League of Ireland First Division season was the 24th season of the League of Ireland First Division. The First Division was contested by 10 teams and Dundalk won the division.

== Club information ==
Team	Base	Manager	Main sponsor	Kit supplier	Stadium	Capacity
Athlone Town	Athlone	(Republic of Ireland) Brendan Place	Ganly's Hardware	O'Neills	Athlone Town Stadium	2,000
Dundalk	Dundalk	(Republic of Ireland) John Gill	IJM	Umbro	Oriel Park	6,000
Kildare County	Newbridge	(Republic of Ireland) Joe Somerville	Cill Dara Betting	O'Neills	Station Road	2,500
Limerick 37	Limerick	(Republic of Ireland) Michael Kerley	Limerick's Live 95FM	Jako	Jackman Park	8,000
Longford Town	Longford	(Republic of Ireland) Alan Gough	Flancare	Umbro	Flancare Park	4,500
Monaghan United	Monaghan	(Republic of Ireland) Mick Cooke	The Squeeling Pig	Nike	Century Homes Park	3,000
Shelbourne	Drumcondra	(Republic of Ireland) Dermot Keely	Cab 2000	Umbro	Tolka Park	9,700
Sporting Fingal	Fingal	(Republic of Ireland) Liam Buckley	Keelings	O'Neills	Morton Stadium	10,000
Waterford United	Waterford	(Republic of Ireland) Gareth Cronin	Hutchison 3G	Azzurri	Waterford RSC	8,000
Wexford Youths	Crossabeg	(Republic of Ireland) Mick Wallace	Wallace Construction	O'Neills	Ferrycarraig Park	5,000

== Overview ==
The regular season began on 7 March and concluded on 15 November. Each team played the other teams four times, totaling 36 games. Only the champions, Dundalk, were automatically promoted and there was no promotion/relegation play-off between Premier Division and First Division teams. This was because the 2009 Premier Division would be reduced to 10 clubs.

== Final table ==
Pos	Team	Pld	W	D	L	GF	GA	GD	Pts	Qualification or relegation
1	Dundalk (C)	36	21	8	7	69	30	+39	71	Premier Division
2	Shelbourne	36	20	10	6	55	25	+30	70	
3	Waterford United	36	18	9	9	55	35	+20	63	
4	Sporting Fingal (Note: Sporting Fingal replaced Kilkenny City who withdrew from the league before the season started.)	36	17	11	8	53	32	+21	62	
5	Limerick 37	36	15	7	14	49	45	+4	52	
6	Monaghan United	36	13	8	15	38	51	−13	47	
7	Wexford Youths	36	10	7	19	36	51	−15	37	
8	Longford Town	36	9	8	19	36	55	−19	35	
9	Athlone Town	36	6	14	16	23	51	−28	32	
10	Kildare County (Note: Kildare County were initially relegated to the A Championship after losing a promotion/relegation play-off. However they subsequently gained a reprieve after Cobh Ramblers were refused a First Division licence and were relegated directly from the Premier Division to the A Championship .)	36	6	8	22	34	73	−39	26	Lost promotion/relegation play-off

Rules for classification: 1) points; 2) goal difference; 3) number of goals scored.
(C) Champions

== Results ==
=== Matches 1 to 18 ===
Home \ Away	ATH	DUN	KIL	L37	LON	MON	SHE	SFI	WAT	WEX
Athlone Town		0–3	1–1	2–2	1–0	0–0	0–1	0–3	0–0	3–1
Dundalk	1–0		6–0	0–2	0–0	3–0	1–3	3–2	1–0	2–1
Kildare County	1–1	1–2		1–2	0–1	4–0	1–3	0–2	1–2	2–0
Limerick 37	0–0	1–2	4–0		2–1	2–2	0–3	1–3	0–3	2–0
Longford Town	3–0	1–2	0–0	1–2		3–0	2–0	5–1	0–2	0–1
Monaghan United	1–2	0–0	0–0	1–0	1–0		1–0	1–0	0–0	0–2
Shelbourne	2–0	0–0	5–0	0–2	2–0	2–0		1–1	2–0	1–0
Sporting Fingal	2–0	1–1	2–2	1–0	1–1	4–0	0–0		3–1	2–0
Waterford United	1–1	1–0	3–2	3–1	1–1	5–0	1–1	2–0		1–0
Wexford Youths	2–0	0–5	1–1	1–0	1–1	1–2	2–2	0–1	1–2	

Source: www.rsssf.com
Legend: Blue = home team win; Yellow = draw; Red = away team win.

=== Rounds 19 and 36 ===
Home \ Away	ATH	DUN	KIL	L37	LON	MON	SHE	SFI	WAT	WEX
Athlone Town		2–2	3–0	0–3	0–0	1–0	0–1	0–1	1–1	1–0
Dundalk	7–0		4–1	0–1	1–2	3–0	2–1	2–1	2–1	1–0
Kildare County	1–0	1–6		0–2	0–2	1–2	1–2	1–1	1–2	1–2
Limerick 37	0–0	2–0	1–2		1–3	2–1	1–2	1–1	5–1	1–1
Longford Town	1–1	0–3	0–1	1–2		1–3	1–2	0–3	0–3	2–4
Monaghan United	3–0	2–2	3–3	0–2	5–1		2–0	0–2	2–0	1–2
Shelbourne	3–3	0–0	3–1	1–1	5–0	1–0		0–0	0–0	1–0
Sporting Fingal	1–0	0–0	2–0	2–0	0–0	0–1	2–1		3–1	2–3
Waterford United	3–0	0–1	3–1	3–1	4–0	1–1	0–1	2–1		1–0
Wexford Youths	0–0	3–1	0–1	3–0	0–2	1–3	0–3	2–2	1–1	

Source: www.rsssf.com
Legend: Blue = home team win; Yellow = draw; Red = away team win.

== Promotion/relegation play-offs ==
Kildare County and Mervue United, the highest ranked non-reserve team from the 2008 A Championship, played off to see who would play in the 2009 First Division.

18 November 2008	Mervue United	2 – 2	Kildare County	Fahy's Field
20:00	Keogh 10'; Goldbey 28'	Report	Hughes 54' 76'	Referee: Pádraig Sutton (Clare)

21 November 2008	Kildare County	0 – 3	Mervue United	Station Road
19:45		Report	O'Brien 15'; Goldbey 64' 81'	Referee: Sean Grant (Wexford)

Mervue United won 5–2 on aggregate and were promoted to the First Division.

== Top scorers ==
Goalscorers	Goals	Team
(Republic of Ireland) Robbie Doyle	16	Sporting Fingal
(Republic of Ireland) Anthony Flood	15	Shelbourne
(Republic of Ireland) Darren McKenna	13	Longford Town
(Republic of Ireland) Robbie Farrell	11	Dundalk
(Republic of Ireland) Vinny Sullivan	11	Waterford United

== Gallery ==
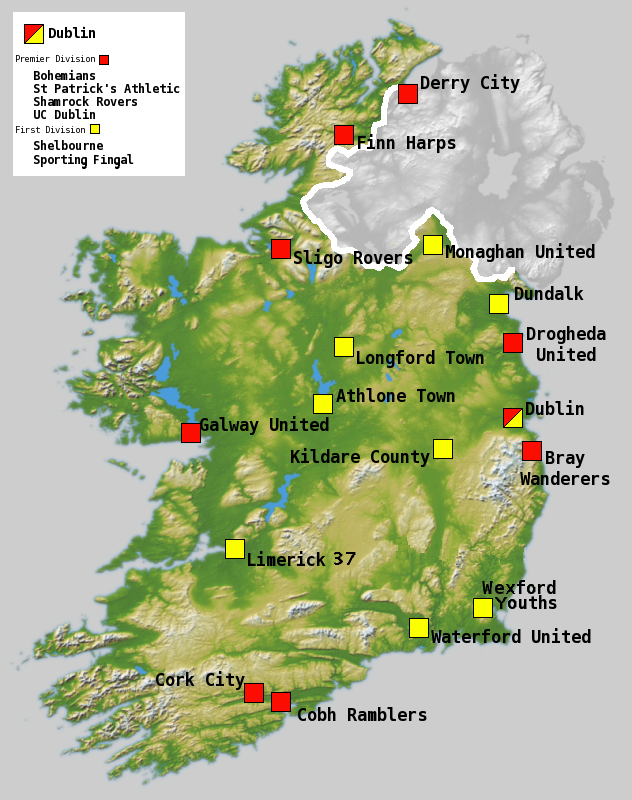
The clubs competing in the 2008 FAI eircom League of Ireland

== See also ==
- 2008 League of Ireland Premier Division
- 2008 League of Ireland Cup
- 2008 A Championship
