= Shaun Williams (footballer) =

Irish footballer (born 1986)

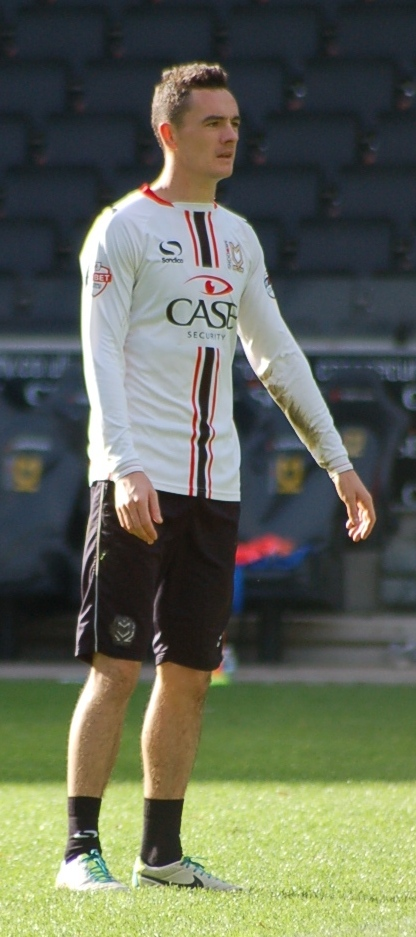
- Williams playing for Milton Keynes Dons in 2013

Personal information
- Full name: Shaun Williams
- Date of birth: 19 October 1986 (age 40)
- Place of birth: Malahide, Dublin, Ireland
- Position: Defensive midfielder

Youth career
- 2005–2006: Drogheda United

Senior career*
Years	Team	Apps	(Gls)
2006–2008	Drogheda United	4	(0)
2007	→ Dundalk (loan)	25	(8)
2008	→ Finn Harps (loan)	14	(2)
2009–2010	Sporting Fingal	45	(13)
2011–2014	Milton Keynes Dons	108	(19)
2014–2021	Millwall	257	(18)
2021–2022	Portsmouth	31	(0)
2022–2024	Gillingham	51	(4)
2024	Eastbourne Borough	5	(0)
Total		540	(64)

International career^{‡}
2007	Republic of Ireland U21	1	(1)
2010	Republic of Ireland U23	1	(1)
2010	League of Ireland XI	1	(0)
2018	Republic of Ireland	3	(1)
- * Club domestic league appearances and goals as of 23:47, 26 October 2024 (UTC) ‡ National team caps and goals as of 29 March 2021 (UTC)

Shaun Williams (born 19 October 1986) is an Irish former professional footballer who played as a midfielder.

During his professional career he played for Drogheda United, Finn Harps, Sporting Fingal, MK Dons, Millwall, Portsmouth, Gillingham and ended his career with Eastbourne Borough. He represented the Republic of Ireland national team at various levels, gaining three caps for the senior team in 2018.

== Career ==
=== Drogheda United ===
Raised in Malahide in North Dublin, Williams signed for nearby League of Ireland club Drogheda United from schoolboy club Home Farm FC at the start of the 2005 season and played with the club's under 21 side for the year. After impressing for the under 21 side, Williams was offered a full-time professional contract with the club which he signed ahead of the 2006 season. Struggling to make his first team breakthrough that year, Drogheda looked to loan him out for the following year for experience.

==== Dundalk loan ====
Williams spent the 2007 League of Ireland First Division season on loan at Drogheda United's County Louth rivals Dundalk. He made 25 appearances, scoring 8 goals as Dundalk finished in 3rd place.

==== Finn Harps loan ====
He spent the opening half of the 2008 season on loan from Drogheda United at Finn Harps following their promotion to the League of Ireland Premier Division in 2007 via the playoffs. He made 14 appearances, scoring two goals. His first goal came in the opening match of the season as Harps beat fellow Premier Division newcomers Cobh Ramblers 2–1 in Finn Park. He followed that up with his second in three games as Harps beat U.C.D. 1–0. Failing to score in the rest of his appearances for Harps, his loan ended in Summer 2008 as he returned to Drogheda United for the remainder of the season.

==== Return from loans ====
He made his first team debut for the club on 20 July 2008, coming off the bench at halftime for Sami Ristilä in a 1–0 win over Cork City. He went on to make a further 3 appearances before the end of the season.

=== Sporting Fingal ===
Williams signed for League of Ireland First Division side Sporting Fingal and made his debut away to Waterford United on 7 March 2009. He scored 10 goals in 25 appearances in all competitions as his side finished 3rd in the league, beating Bray Wanderers 4–2 on aggregate in the Promotion/relegation play-off final. They also beat Sligo Rovers to win the 2009 FAI Cup with Williams playing the full 90 minutes of the Final at Tallaght Stadium. He was voted into the PFAI First Division Team of the Year at the end of the season. The 2010 season was Fingal's first ever season in the League of Ireland Premier Division but they and Williams took to it well, finishing in 4th place and earning a UEFA Europa League place for the following season. Williams made his first appearances in European competition in July 2010 when he captain his side at home and away to C.S. Marítimo of Portugal as they lost both legs 3–2. Williams was selected in the League of Ireland XI to play a friendly against Manchester United in the first ever match at the Aviva Stadium. At the end of the season, Williams won the 2010 PFAI Young Player of the Year award as voted by his fellow players at the end of the season. Just weeks before the 2011 season, Sporting Fingal went out of existence due to financial difficulties leaving Williams a free agent.

=== Milton Keynes Dons ===
On 16 March 2011, Williams signed for MK Dons. Despite making his name as a midfielder, he primarily as a centre-half for the club due to injuries and a small squad. At the end of the 2012–13 campaign, Williams was crowned the MK Dons Player of the Year and the Players' Player of the Year.

=== Millwall ===
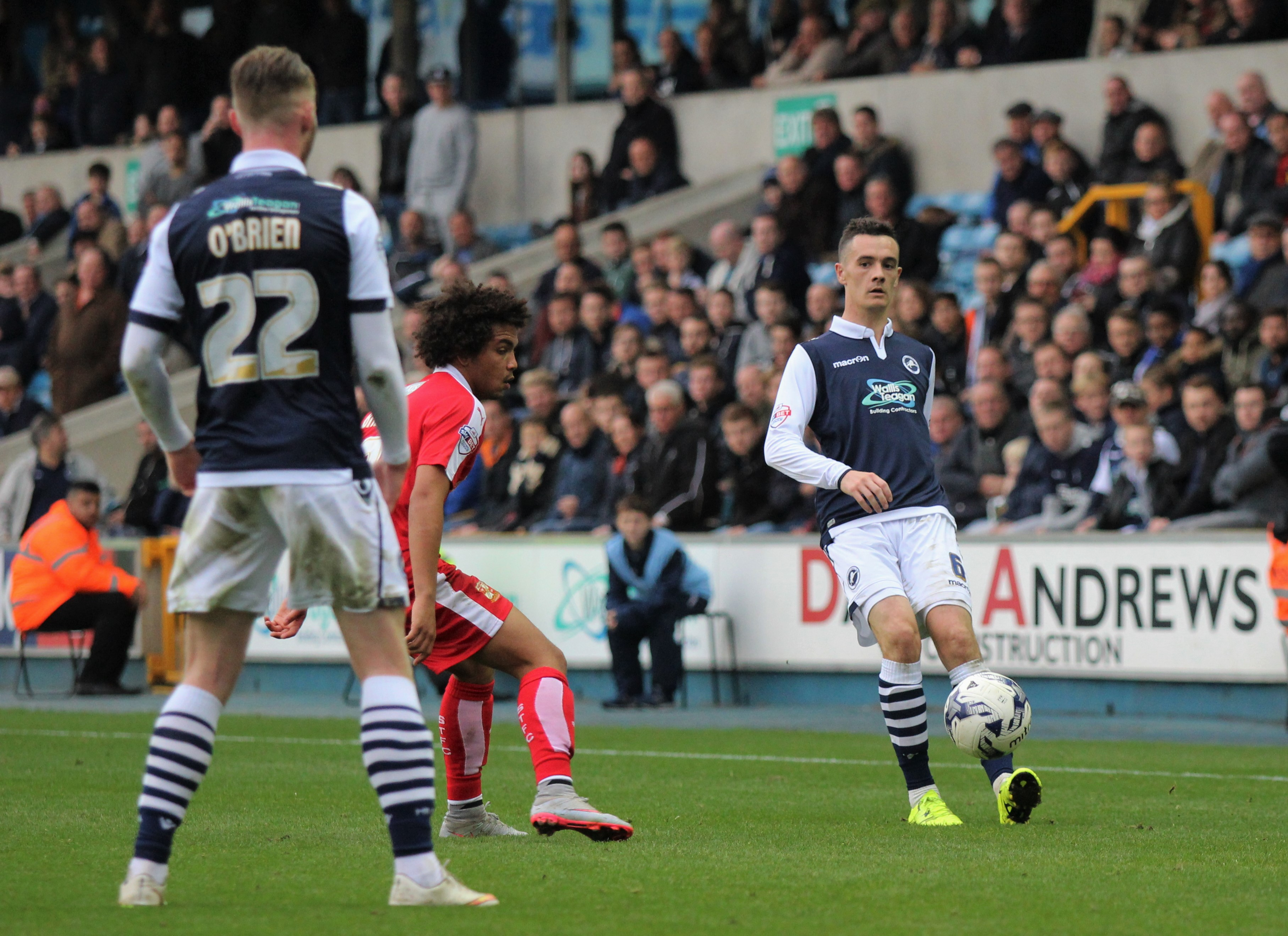
Williams in action for Millwall against Swindon Town in 2015

On 27 January 2014, Williams signed for Millwall on a 2 1/2-year contract for an undisclosed fee. During his time at Millwall he accumulated 290 appearances in all competitions, scoring 22 goals.

=== Portsmouth ===
On 25 June 2021, Williams signed for Portsmouth of League One. Williams was released after one season at the club.

=== Gillingham ===
On 10 June 2022, Williams signed for League Two side Gillingham on a one-year contract, reuniting with his former Millwall manager Neil Harris. He made his debut for the Kent side on the opening day of the 2022–23 season in a 2–0 away defeat to AFC Wimbledon. He scored his first goal for Gillingham on 5 February 2023, the only goal in a 1–0 home victory over Crawley Town. On 28 April 2023 it was announced that Williams had signed a new contract with the Kent club. On 3 August 2023 he was named as Gillingham club captain ahead of the 2023–24 season.

On 15 May 2024, the club announced that he would be released in the summer when his contract expired.

=== Eastbourne Borough ===
On 13 September 2024, Williams joined National League South club Eastbourne Borough. Williams announced his retirement on 3 February 2025.

== International career ==
He made his senior Republic of Ireland debut at the age of 31 in a 2–0 friendly loss against France in May 2018. Williams scored his first senior international goal for Ireland on 6 September 2018, after coming off the bench against Wales with a goal that was Ireland's first ever goal in the UEFA Nations League. He made his third and final appearance for the national side in a 1–1 friendly draw to Poland on 11 September 2018.

== Coaching career ==
In May 2025, Williams was appointed first-team coach at Isthmian League Premier Division side Welling United.

== International goals ==
Scores and results list Ireland's goal tally first.

No.	Date	Venue	Opponent	Score	Result	Competition
1.	6 September 2018	Cardiff City Stadium, Cardiff, Wales	Wales	1–4	1–4	2018–19 UEFA Nations League B

== Career statistics ==
As of match played 26 October 2024

Club	Season	League			National Cup		League Cup		Europe		Other		Total	
Club	Season	Division	Apps	Goals	Apps	Goals	Apps	Goals	Apps	Goals	Apps	Goals	Apps	Goals
Drogheda United	2006	LOI Premier Division	0	0	0	0	0	0	0 (Note: Appearances in UEFA Cup)	0	0 (Note: Appearances in Setanta Sports Cup)	0	0	0
Drogheda United	2007	LOI Premier Division	0	0	—		—		—		—		0	0
Drogheda United	2008	LOI Premier Division	4	0	—		—		0 (Note: Appearances in UEFA Champions League)	0	0	0	4	0
Drogheda United	Total		4	0	0	0	0	0	0	0	0	0	4	0
Dundalk (loan)	2007	LOI First Division	25	8	0	0	0	0	—		—		25	8
Finn Harps (loan)	2008	LOI Premier Division	14	2	0	0	1	0	—		—		15	2
Sporting Fingal	2009	LOI First Division	13	8	6	1	3	0	—		3 (Note: Appearances in League of Ireland promotion/relegation play-offs)	1	25	10
Sporting Fingal	2010	LOI Premier Division	32	5	5	1	1	0	2 (Note: Appearances in UEFA Europa League)	0	0 (Note: Appearances in Leinster Senior Cup)	0	40	6
Sporting Fingal	Total		45	13	11	2	4	0	2	0	3	1	65	16
Milton Keynes Dons	2011–12	League One	39	8	4	0	3	0	—		3 (Note: One appearance in Football League Trophy, two appearances in League One play-offs)	0	49	8
Milton Keynes Dons	2012–13	League One	44	3	7	3	3	0	—		1 (Note: Appearances in Football League Trophy)	0	55	6
Milton Keynes Dons	2013–14	League One	25	8	4	1	2	0	—		2	1	33	10
Milton Keynes Dons	Total		108	19	15	4	8	0	—		6	1	137	24
Millwall	2013–14	Championship	17	1	—		—		—		—		17	1
Millwall	2014–15	Championship	38	2	0	0	1	0	—		—		39	2
Millwall	2015–16	League One	33	2	2	0	1	0	—		7 (Note: Four appearances in Football League Trophy, three appearances in Football League One play-offs)	2	43	4
Millwall	2016–17	League One	45	4	6	0	1	1	—		4 (Note: Two appearances in EFL Trophy, three appearances in EFL League One play-offs)	0	56	5
Millwall	2017–18	Championship	35	2	3	0	2	0	—		0	0	40	2
Millwall	2018–19	Championship	31	5	4	0	2	1	—		—		37	6
Millwall	2019–20	Championship	32	2	0	0	2	0	—		—		34	2
Millwall	2020–21	Championship	27	0	0	0	2	0	—		—		24	0
Millwall	Total		257	18	15	0	11	2	—		12	0	290	22
Portsmouth	2021–22	League One	31	0	2	0	1	0	—		1	0	35	0
Gillingham	2022–23	League Two	37	3	4	0	3	0	—		3	0	47	3
Gillingham	2023–24	League Two	14	1	2	0	1	0	—		0	0	17	1
Gillingham	Total		51	4	6	0	4	0	—		3	0	64	4
Eastbourne Borough	2024–25	National League South	5	0	1	0	—		—		0	0	6	0
Career Total			535	57	50	6	29	2	2	0	25	2	641	69

== Honours ==
Millwall

- EFL League One play-offs: 2017

Individual

- PFAI Team of the Year: First Division (2009), Premier Division (2010)
- PFAI Young Player of the Year: 2010
- Milton Keynes Dons Player of the Year: 2012–13
- Milton Keynes Dons Players' Player of the Year: 2012–13
