= 2008 League of Ireland Cup =

Eircom League Cup

Tournament details
- Country: Ireland; Northern Ireland
- Teams: 24

Final positions
- Champions: Derry City
- Runners-up: Wexford Youths

The 2008 League of Ireland Cup was the 35th staging of the League of Ireland knockout competition. It was won by Derry City.

Twenty four clubs participated in this year's competition. The twelve Premier Division and ten First Division clubs were joined by Kildrum Tigers, the 2007 Ulster Senior League champions, and the Kerry District League representative side. For both the First and Second rounds of the competition, all participating clubs were split into four regional pools with the further rounds of the competition having an open draw.

The 2008 eircom League of Ireland Cup officially kicked off on the Bank Holiday weekend of Monday, 24 March 2008 when 14 eircom league clubs were joined by Kildrum Tigers and Kerry in the First Round. Bohemians, Cork City, Drogheda United and St. Patrick's Athletic all received a bye into the Second Round of the competition due to their future participation in European competitions. Four more clubs received a bye into the Second Round as a result of an open draw: Derry City, Finn Harps, Limerick 37 and UCD.

The competition ran until late September, with the final taking place on Saturday, 27 September 2008 at Ferrycarrig Park. where Derry City delivered a spectacular performance to defeat hosts Wexford Youths 6–1.

== First round ==
=== Pool A ===
Team 1	Score	Team 2
Kerry District League	1–1 (aet, p. 3–2)	Waterford United
Wexford Youths	1–0 (aet)	Cobh Ramblers

=== Pool B ===
Team 1	Score	Team 2
Kildrum Tigers	1–6	Sligo Rovers
Galway United	2–0	Longford Town

=== Pool C ===
Team 1	Score	Team 2
Sporting Fingal	2–2 (aet, p. 5–6)	Shelbourne
Dundalk	3–0	Monaghan United

=== Pool D ===
Team 1	Score	Team 2
Bray Wanderers	3–0	Athlone Town
Kildare County	0–3	Shamrock Rovers

== Second round ==
=== Pool A ===
Team 1	Score	Team 2
Wexford Youths	2–0	Kerry League
Cork City	3–0	Limerick 37

=== Pool B ===
Team 1	Score	Team 2
Sligo Rovers	0–0 (aet, p. 5–6)	Galway United
Derry City	3–0	Finn Harps

=== Pool C ===
Team 1	Score	Team 2
Bohemians	4–0	Dundalk
Shelbourne	0–2	Drogheda United

=== Pool D ===
Team 1	Score	Team 2
Bray Wanderers	1–0	Shamrock Rovers
UCD	2–0	St Patrick's Athletic

== Quarterfinals ==
The matches were played on Tuesday, 1 July 2008.

Team 1	Score	Team 2
Galway United	3–0	Bray Wanderers
UCD	1–2	Wexford Youths
Derry City	4–1	Bohemians
Drogheda United	0–2	Cork City

== Semifinals ==
4 August 2008
19:45 IST

Galway United	0 – 2	Derry City
	Report	Morrow 72' (pen.); McGinn 82'

Terryland Park, Galway
Referee: M. Gough

25 August 2008
19:45 IST

Cork City	0 – 1	Wexford Youths
	Report	P. Murphy 24'

Turners Cross, Cork
Attendance: 1,647
Referee: D. Tomney

== Final ==
27 September 2008
19:30 IST

Wexford Youths	1 – 6	Derry City
Furlong 25'	Report	Morrow 15' 28' 70'; McGinn 19' 30'; Deery 27'

Ferrycarrig Park, Wexford
Attendance: 3000
Referee: R. Winter
