= John Frost (footballer) =

Irish footballer

Personal information
- Full name: John Maurice Frost
- Date of birth: 20 May 1980 (age 46)
- Place of birth: Waterford, Ireland
- Position: Left back

Team information
- Current team: Waterford (Coach)

Senior career*
| Years | Team | Apps | (Gls) |
| 1997–2005 | Waterford United | ? | (?) |
| 2005–2008 | St Patrick's Athletic | ? | (?) |
| 2008–2010 | Sporting Fingal | 21 | (0) |
| 2011 | Limerick | 25 | (1) |
| 2012–2014 | Waterford United | 40 | (0) |
- * Club domestic league appearances and goals

John Frost (born 20 May 1980) is an Irish professional footballer who last played for Waterford United in the League of Ireland In 2017 Frost returned to the RSC as a coach to Alan Reynolds.

== Early life ==
At the age of five, Frost was run over by a car; he suffered a fractured skull, broken thigh bone and a broken right arm as a result.

== Career ==
Frost first came to notice when nominated for the FAI's Schools Player of the Year in 1998. He was a regular in the Republic of Ireland youth teams by then and soon made his debut in the League of Ireland for hometown club Waterford United. His performances led Frost to being called into the Republic of Ireland under 21 squad. In 2000 Waterford lost a relegation play off and many commentators expected Frost to leave but he stayed loyal and was rewarded with the club captaincy. Waterford won promotion by winning the First Division in the 2002–03 season and Frost had his first senior medal. Frost is a left full back and joined St. Pats from Waterford United in July 2005 when financial difficulties forced Waterford to offload their top players. Frost has lost 2 FAI Cup finals, in 2004 and in 2006. He represented his country at the UEFA U-19 Championship in Sweden in 1999 where he won a bronze medal In December 2012 he rejoined his hometown club

== Honours ==
Sporting Fingal

- FAI Cup (1): 2009

Waterford United

- League of Ireland First Division (1): 2002-03
