= 2010 Leinster Senior Cup =

Leinster Football Association Senior Cup

Tournament details
- Teams: 20

Final positions
- Champions: Shelbourne
- Runners-up: Bray Wanderers

Tournament statistics
- Top goal scorer: Shane O'Neill (6 goals)

The 2010 Leinster Football Association Senior Cup, also known as the 2010 Leinster Senior Cup, was the 109th staging of the Leinster Senior Cup association football competition. The 2010 Leinster Senior Cup marked the return of the competition following a ten-year absence.

Twenty teams competed in the 2010 competition. The teams entered included the League of Ireland clubs affiliated to the Leinster Football Association, the top four clubs from the 2008–09 Leinster Senior League Senior Division and the two 2009 Leinster Junior Cup finalists. The 12 clubs from both the League of Ireland Premier Division and League of Ireland First Division automatically qualified for the first round of the competition while the eight clubs from the A Championship, Leinster Senior League and the Athletic Union League entered into a Preliminary Round.

The 2010 Leinster Senior Cup kicked off with the preliminary round on 26 January 2010 and concluded with the Final on 2 August 2010 when Shelbourne defeated Bray Wanderers 4–0 at the Carlisle Grounds, Bray.

== Preliminary round ==
The draw for the Premliminary round took place on 13 January 2010.

Tie no	Home team	Score	Away team	Report
1	Bluebell United	2 – 0	Wayside Celtic	
2	Tolka Rovers	3 – 0	St. Kevins Boys	
3	Ballymun United	2 – 0	F.C. Carlow	
4	Bangor Celtic	1 – 0	Tullamore Town	

== First round ==
The draw for the first round took place on 13 January 2010.

Tie no	Home team	Score	Away team	Report
1	Shamrock Rovers	2 – 1	Wexford Youths	Report
2	Bohemians	1 – 0	Bluebell United	Report
3	Tolka Rovers	0 – 2	Shelbourne	
4	Sporting Fingal	1 – 1 AET	Longford Town	Report
Sporting Fingal won 4 – 2 on penalties
5	Bray Wanderers	2 – 1	Athlone Town	Report
6	Ballymun United	0 – 2	Dundalk	
7	Bangor Celtic	1 – 2 AET	UCD	Report
8	St. Patrick's Athletic	0 – 1	Drogheda United	Report

== Quarterfinals ==
The draw for the Quarter Finals took place on 10 March 2010.

Tie no	Home team	Score	Away team	Report
1	Bray Wanderers	2 – 2 AET	Dundalk	Report
Bray Wanderers won 4 – 3 on penalties
2	Shamrock Rovers	1 – 3	Shelbourne	Report
3	Bohemians	0 – 2	Sporting Fingal	Report
4	UCD	2 – 0	Drogheda United	Report

== Semifinals ==
The draw for the Semifinals took place on 6 May 2010.

Tie no	Home team	Score	Away team	Report
1	Shelbourne	2 – 1 AET	Sporting Fingal	Report
2	Bray Wanderers	3 – 1	UCD	Report

== Final ==
The draw for home advantage in the final took place on 23 July 2010.

2 August 2010
15.30 IST

Bray Wanderers	0 – 4	Shelbourne
	Report	Daniel Corcoran 41'; David Cassidy 57'; Marc Hughes 73'; Mark Leech 82'

Carlisle Grounds, Bray
Referee: D. Hanney
