= Graham Barrett =

Irish footballer (born 1981)

Personal information
- Full name: Graham Barrett
- Date of birth: 6 October 1981 (age 45)
- Place of birth: Dublin, Ireland
- Height: 5 ft 10 in (1.78 m)
- Position: Forward

Youth career
- Arsenal

Senior career*
Years	Team	Apps	(Gls)
1998–2003	Arsenal	2	(0)
2000–2001	→ Bristol Rovers (loan)	1	(0)
2001	→ Crewe Alexandra (loan)	3	(0)
2001–2002	→ Colchester United (loan)	20	(4)
2002–2003	→ Brighton & Hove Albion (loan)	30	(1)
2003–2006	Coventry City	55	(6)
2005	→ Sheffield Wednesday (loan)	6	(1)
2005–2006	→ Livingston (loan)	6	(0)
2006–2009	Falkirk	48	(8)
2009	St Johnstone	9	(1)
2009–2010	Shamrock Rovers	21	(1)
Total		201	(22)

International career
1998–2000	Republic of Ireland U18	11	(4)
2000–2003	Republic of Ireland U21	24	(6)
2002–2004	Republic of Ireland	6	(2)
Medal record
Men's football
Representing Republic of Ireland
UEFA Euro U-16
Winner	1998 Scotland
- * Club domestic league appearances and goals

Graham Barrett (born 6 October 1981) is an Irish former professional footballer who played as a forward.

He began his footballing career at Arsenal, where he won the FA Youth Cup. He went on to feature for English clubs Bristol Rovers, Crewe Alexandra, Colchester United and Brighton & Hove Albion. He also appeared for Coventry City and Sheffield Wednesday. Barrett as well had spells with Scottish sides Livingston, Falkirk and St Johnstone. He then joined up with Irish outfit Shamrock Rovers, with whom he won a League of Ireland championship medal. Barrett also played as an international for the Republic of Ireland national team.

== Club career ==
=== Arsenal ===
Born in Dublin, Ireland, Barrett signed professional terms with Arsenal in October 1998. He made his debut for the Gunners as a late substitute for Thierry Henry in a 3–0 victory at Leicester City in December 1999 He also featured as a substitute in their 4–1 win over Sunderland the following month.

Having already won the 1998 UEFA Under-16 Championship with Ireland, Barrett then captained Arsenal's youth team to win the 2000 FA Youth Cup. During one of the final's two legs he received the man of the match award. Following such Gunners' manager Arsène Wenger encouraged Barrett to go out on loan to gain some experience. As so he joined up with club Bristol Rovers in December 2000. However he played just 20 minutes under Ian Holloway, and was diagnosed with glandular fever thus losing a stone in weight and spending six-months on the sidelines.

During the 2001–02 season, Barrett again went out on loan, this time to Crewe Alexandra, where he made three appearances in his month-long loan stint. He then returned to Arsenal before Wenger agreed to allow him to join Colchester United on loan in December 2001. Barrett quickly became a fan favorite at the club, in scoring a brace during a 3–2 win against Northampton Town on Boxing Day 2001. These were his first goals in professional football in only his third game with the U's. Barrett then netted a further two goals in 20 games for Colchester, but an injury suffered during a 0–0 draw with Wycombe Wanderers curtailed the rest of his season. As a mark of respect, United fans dressed in green in their final home game of the season, in a nod to Barrett's Irish roots. Colchester manager Steve Whitton thus sought to have Barrett back at Layer Road for the following season. With this being said he opted to go to Brighton & Hove Albion on a season-long loan deal. Prior to joining Brighton he made his full international debut for Ireland in August 2002. This came after having made 24 appearances for the under-21s and representing Ireland at every age group since turning 15. He also scored in a pre-season friendly for Arsenal against Stevenage. With Brighton, Barrett managed to attain 20 league starts, making a further ten appearances as a substitute, but again suffered a series of niggling injuries that held back his progress. At Brighton he also scored once against Sheffield United.

=== Coventry City ===
Barrett was released from Highbury in May 2003, joining Coventry City on a three-year deal on 30 May. Barrett's injury problems continued while with the Sky Blues, where he made 32 league starts and made 23 substitute appearances in two seasons, scoring six goals. He joined Sheffield Wednesday on the loan deadline day in March 2005, where he scored once against Torquay United in six appearances. Barrett was told by manager Micky Adams that he was free to leave the club despite having one year remaining on his contract. Despite this he remained at Coventry, but, out of the first-team picture, went on loan to Scotland with Livingston. He played just six games for the club before suffering a season-ending knee injury.

=== Falkirk ===
Signing a two-year with Scottish side Falkirk following his release from Coventry in August 2006, with the Bairns' medical staff satisfied with his rehabilitation after his serious knee injury the previous season. Once again though, Barrett suffered further injuries, requiring an operation on his knee in October 2006. He returned to action for the 2007–08 season, going on to sign a one-year contract extension in March 2008. After three operations and later being informed that his injury had been misdiagnosed, Barrett left Falkirk after manager John Hughes sat him down and told him he would never be the player he was before suffering his injuries. He was released from the club in January 2009. He had scored eight goals in 48 league games at the Falkirk Stadium.

=== St Johnstone ===
After going on trial with Heart of Midlothian, St Johnstone stepped in to sign Barrett after Hearts decided against handing him a deal. He was brought in to cover a spate of injuries amongst St Johnstones' forwards in February 2009. After nine appearances and one goal against Airdrieonians, Barrett was released by the club in the summer of 2009.

=== Shamrock Rovers ===
Barrett returned to his native Ireland with Shamrock Rovers in August 2009. In his two seasons with the club, he amassed 21 appearances and scored once, but he still struggled with persistent injuries, holding him back from progressing and making a greater number of appearances. He finally had to admit defeat in the 2010 season, playing his last game in July 2010, meaning he could not play a part in the chase for the League of Ireland title. His manager at Rovers, Michael O'Neill, advised Barrett to assess his options, warning that he would "need to be careful and think about a few years' time." As The Hoops went on to take the League of Ireland title, Barrett was still eligible for a league winners medal.

== International career ==
Barrett represented the Republic of Ireland since the age of 15. He was a part of the Irish side which won the 1998 UEFA European Under-16 Championship in Scotland. He went on to play eleven under-18 games for Ireland, scoring four goals.

Barrett then scored on his senior debut for Ireland in a 3–0 victory over Finland.

== Personal life ==
Having grown up close to Tallaght, Barrett followed his father, Gary, in playing for Shamrock Rovers. Gary began his playing career with Shamrock Rovers in 1980 under Johnny Giles, where he scored a number of goals. This factor was a draw to Graham when joining the club himself in 2009. His son, Cian Barrett, made his Shamrock Rovers first team debut in 2023.

== Career statistics ==
=== Club ===
Appearances and goals by club, season and competition
Club	Season	League			FA Cup		League Cup		Total	
Club	Season	Division	Apps	Goals	Apps	Goals	Apps	Goals	Apps	Goals
Arsenal	1999–2000	Premier League	2	0	0	0	0	0	2	0
Arsenal	2000–01	Premier League	0	0	0	0	1	0	1	0
Arsenal	2001–02	Premier League	0	0	0	0	0	0	0	0
Arsenal	2002–03	Premier League	0	0	0	0	0	0	0	0
Arsenal	Total		2	0	0	0	1	0	3	0
Bristol Rovers (loan)	2000–01	Second Division	1	0	0	0	0	0	1	0
Crewe Alexandra (loan)	2001–02	First Division	3	0	0	0	1	0	4	0
Colchester United (loan)	2001–02	Second Division	20	4	0	0	0	0	20	4
Brighton & Hove Albion (loan)	2002–03	First Division	30	1	1	0	0	0	31	1
Coventry City	2003–04	First Division	31	2	0	0	2	1	33	3
Coventry City	2004–05	Championship	24	4	0	0	2	0	26	4
Coventry City	2005–06	Championship	0	0	0	0	0	0	0	0
Coventry City	Total		55	6	0	0	4	1	59	7
Sheffield Wednesday (loan)	2004–05	League One	6	1	0	0	0	0	6	1
Livingston (loan)	2005–06	Scottish Premier League	6	0	0	0	1	0	7	0
Falkirk	2006–07	Scottish Premier League	0	0	0	0	0	0	0	0
Falkirk	2007–08	Scottish Premier League	33	6	2	1	1	0	36	7
Falkirk	2008–09	Scottish Premier League	15	2	1	2	3	0	19	4
Falkirk	Total		48	8	3	3	4	0	55	11
St Johnstone	2008–09	Scottish First Division	9	1	0	0	0	0	9	1
Shamrock Rovers	2009	League of Ireland Premier Division	10	1	0	0	0	0	10	1
Shamrock Rovers	2010	League of Ireland Premier Division	11	0	0	0	0	0	11	0
Shamrock Rovers	Total		21	1	0	0	0	0	21	1
Career total			201	22	4	3	11	1	216	26

=== International ===
Appearances and goals by national team and year
National team	Year	Apps	Goals
Republic of Ireland	2002	1	1
Republic of Ireland	2004	5	1
Total		6	2

Scores and results list the Republic of Ireland's goal tally first, score column indicates score after each Barrett goal.

List of international goals scored by Graham Barrett
No.	Date	Venue	Opponent	Score	Result	Competition
1	21 August 2002	Olympic Stadium, Helsinki, Finland	Finland	3–0	3–0	Friendly
2	2 June 2004	The Valley, London, England	Jamaica	1–0	1–0	2004 Unity Cup

== Honours ==
Arsenal

- FA Youth Cup: 2000

Shamrock Rovers

- League of Ireland Premier Division: 2010

Republic of Ireland

- Unity Cup runner-up: 2004

Republic of Ireland U16

- UEFA European Under-16 Championship: 1998

All honours referenced by:
