= John Mulroy =

John Mulroy may refer to:

- John H. Mulroy, the first county executive of Onondaga County, New York
- John Mulroy (footballer), Irish footballer
