= Fingal Sports Complex =

Proposed multi-sport facility

Coordinates: 53.524848°N 6.154228°W

The Fingal Sports Complex was a facility set to be built in Lusk, Fingal, Republic of Ireland by Fingal County Council. The facility was proposed to cost €10 million, and intended to host a number of sporting events and groups - including association football club Sporting Fingal (which disbanded in 2011). As of 2012, there were no plans to progress the project.

== History ==
The plans for a new sports complex in County Fingal came about initially as plans for an association football stadium but plans were later expanded to include other sports. The committee analysing the proposal at Balbriggan and Swords approved the plans to be allowed on public display except for one councillor, who wanted to hear more from council officials about the proposal. It was initially costed at €10 million, with the funding coming from Fingal County Council, developmental levies and a grant from the Department of Arts, Sports, and Tourism on the assumption that the Football Association of Ireland would continue to be involved.

The proposal was approved in March 2009 but was however embargoed by the Department of Environment, Heritage and Local Government on environmental grounds. Some in Lusk still stated they wanted to proceed with the development. However, it was revealed in 2012 that the field where it was due to be constructed was being let out to a local farmer to grow crops. This led to it being called a "vegetable patch".
