= 2009 League of Ireland Premier Division =

League of Ireland Premier Division
- Season: 2009
- Champions: Bohemians (11th title)
- Relegated: Cork City; Derry City
- UEFA Champions League: Bohemians
- UEFA Europa League: Shamrock Rovers; Dundalk; Sporting Fingal (Note: Sporting Fingal who played in the First Division qualified for the 2010–11 UEFA Europa League after winning the 2009 FAI Cup Final.)
- Top goalscorer: Gary Twigg: 24 (Shamrock Rovers)

The 2009 League of Ireland Premier Division was the 25th season of the League of Ireland Premier Division. The division was made up of 10 teams. Bohemians were champions while Shamrock Rovers finished as runners-up.

== Teams ==
Location of teams in the 2009 League of Ireland Premier Division

Team	Base	Manager	Stadium
Bohemians	Phibsborough	(Republic of Ireland) Pat Fenlon	Dalymount Park
Bray Wanderers	Bray	(Republic of Ireland) Eddie Gormley	Carlisle Grounds
Cork City	Cork	(Republic of Ireland) Paul Doolin	Turners Cross
Derry City	Derry	(Republic of Ireland) Stephen Kenny	Brandywell Stadium
Drogheda United	Drogheda	(Republic of Ireland) Alan Mathews	United Park
Dundalk	Dundalk	(Northern Ireland) Seán Connor	Oriel Park
Galway United	Galway	(England) Ian Foster	Terryland Park
Shamrock Rovers	Tallaght	(Northern Ireland) Michael O'Neill	Tallaght Stadium
Sligo Rovers	Sligo	(England) Paul Cook	The Showgrounds
St Patrick's Athletic	Inchicore	(Republic of Ireland) Pete Mahon	Richmond Park

== Overview ==
The 2009 Premier Division featured 10 clubs. The regular season began on 6 March and concluded on 6 November. Each team played every other team four times, totalling 36 matches. On the final day of the regular season Bohemians were crowned League of Ireland champions for the eleventh time in the club's history after drawing 1–1 with Bray Wanderers at the Carlisle Grounds. After the season ended both Derry City and Cork City were expelled from the League of Ireland. Derry City were accused of making extra payments to players using unofficial secondary contracts. This was against league rules which placed limits on the amount clubs could spend on players' wages. Cork City had been in serious financial difficulties for several seasons and its holding company was eventually wound up by the High Court. However both clubs were effectively reformed and were subsequently allowed to join the 2010 First Division.

== Final table ==
Pos	Team	Pld	W	D	L	GF	GA	GD	Pts	Qualification or relegation
1	Bohemians (C)	36	24	5	7	62	21	+41	77	Qualification to Champions League second qualifying round
2	Shamrock Rovers	36	21	10	5	51	27	+24	73	Qualification to Europa League second qualifying round
3	Cork City (Note: Cork City were expelled from Premier Division after its holding company was wound up by the High Court.) (R)	36	17	9	10	42	28	+14	60	Relegation to League of Ireland First Division
4	Derry City (Note: Derry City were expelled from Premier Division after accusations of making extra payments to players using unofficial secondary contracts.) (R)	36	18	5	13	49	31	+18	59	Relegation to League of Ireland First Division
5	Dundalk	36	12	8	16	46	51	−5	44	Qualification to Europa League first qualifying round
6	Sligo Rovers	36	11	10	15	41	51	−10	43	
7	St Patrick's Athletic	36	13	4	19	29	46	−17	43	
8	Galway United	36	12	6	18	36	57	−21	42	
9	Drogheda United (O)	36	7	11	18	32	50	−18	32	Qualification to Relegation play-off
10	Bray Wanderers (Note: Despite losing play-off, Bray Wanderers retained their place in the Premier Division after Cork City and Derry City were relegated.)	36	6	10	20	30	56	−26	28	Qualification to Relegation play-off

Rules for classification: 1) points; 2) goal difference; 3) number of goals scored.
(C) Champions; (O) Play-off winners; (R) Relegated

== Results ==
=== Matches 1–18 ===
Home \ Away	BOH	BRW	COR	DER	DRO	DUN	GAL	SHM	SLI	StP
Bohemians	—	2–0	0–1	1–1	1–0	5–0	2–0	2–0	2–0	3–0
Bray Wanderers	1–3	—	0–2	1–1	0–1	1–1	2–2	0–0	3–1	2–1
Cork City	0–1	2–1	—	1–0	1–0	1–2	1–0	0–0	1–0	0–1
Derry City	3–2	2–0	2–1	—	1–0	0–1	1–1	0–0	1–2	1–0
Drogheda United	0–1	0–0	2–1	0–3	—	1–1	0–1	2–2	0–0	1–0
Dundalk	0–1	3–0	1–2	1–0	3–0	—	1–0	0–1	0–2	0–1
Galway United	0–2	3–0	0–2	0–3	1–1	1–0	—	1–3	0–0	2–1
Shamrock Rovers	2–1	0–1	1–1	1–2	1–1	3–1	1–0	—	2–1	2–0
Sligo Rovers	0–0	2–1	1–1	0–1	2–2	1–3	2–0	0–3	—	0–1
St Patrick's Athletic	3–1	1–1	0–3	0–3	2–1	2–0	0–3	1–2	2–2	—

Source: loi.ie
Legend: Blue = home team win; Yellow = draw; Red = away team win.

=== Matches 19–36 ===
Home \ Away	BOH	BRW	COR	DER	DRO	DUN	GAL	SHM	SLI	StP
Bohemians	—	1–2	1–0	1–0	4–0	3–2	5–0	0–0	3–1	3–1
Bray Wanderers	1–1	—	3–2	0–1	1–2	1–1	1–2	1–2	2–2	0–1
Cork City	0–2	1–0	—	2–0	0–0	2–1	4–2	0–0	0–0	0–1
Derry City	0–1	3–0	1–1	—	0–1	3–0	1–3	0–1	1–2	1–0
Drogheda United	1–1	1–2	0–1	1–3	—	2–2	4–0	0–1	2–2	1–2
Dundalk	0–2	0–0	1–0	1–2	4–2	—	3–0	2–4	2–2	0–0
Galway United	0–2	3–1	2–2	3–1	0–2	0–3	—	0–1	1–0	2–1
Shamrock Rovers	1–0	3–1	1–2	2–1	2–0	2–2	1–1	—	3–1	1–0
Sligo Rovers	1–0	1–0	0–3	0–4	3–1	3–4	2–0	1–2	—	2–0
St Patrick's Athletic	0–2	2–0	1–1	0–2	1–0	1–0	1–2	1–0	0–2	—

Source: loi.ie
Legend: Blue = home team win; Yellow = draw; Red = away team win.

== Promotion/relegation play-offs ==
The ninth and tenth placed teams from the Premier Division, Drogheda United and Bray Wanderers, played off after the regular season was completed. The winner would retain a place in the 2010 Premier Division. The loser would play off against the winner of the 2009 First Division play off. The winner of this match would also gain a place in the 2010 Premier Division.

Premier Division

10 November 2009	Drogheda United	2–0	Bray Wanderers	United Park
19:45 GMT	Chambers 60'; King 82'	Report	Mulroy (red card) 84'	Referee: D. Hancock

Drogheda United retain their place in the 2010 Premier Division

Premier Division v First Division

13 November 2009	Sporting Fingal	2–0	Bray Wanderers	Morton Stadium
19:45 GMT	Paisley 51'; Byrne 67'	Report		Attendance: 740; Referee: D. Tomney

16 November 2009	Bray Wanderers	2–2	Sporting Fingal	Carlisle Grounds
19:45 GMT	Flood 83'; O'Connor 90+1'	Report	Zayed 59'; Bayly 90+2'	Referee: D. Hanney

Sporting Fingal won 4–2 on aggregate and were promoted to the Premier Division. The result of the play off would eventually prove null and void. Despite losing play-off, Bray Wanderers also retained their place in the Premier Division after Cork City and Derry City were relegated.

== Top goalscorers ==
Rank	Scorer	Team	Goals
1	(Scotland) Gary Twigg	Shamrock Rovers	24
2	(Republic of Ireland) Jason Byrne	Bohemians	22
3	(Republic of Ireland) Raffaele Cretaro	Sligo Rovers	15
4	(Northern Ireland) Chris Turner	Dundalk	12
5	(Republic of Ireland) Mark Farren	Derry City	10

Last updated: 6 November 2009
Source: soccerway.com

== See also ==
- 2009 League of Ireland First Division
- 2009 League of Ireland Cup
- 2009 A Championship
