= 2009 League of Ireland First Division =

League of Ireland First Division
- Season: 2009
- Champions: UCD
- Promoted: Sporting Fingal
- UEFA Europa League: Sporting Fingal
- Top goalscorer: Conan Byrne: 21 (Sporting Fingal)

The 2009 League of Ireland First Division season was the 25th season of the League of Ireland First Division. The First Division was contested by 12 teams and UCD won the title. Third placed Sporting Fingal also won the 2009 FAI Cup Final, qualified for the 2010–11 UEFA Europa League and were promoted to the Premier Division after winning a promotion/relegation play off.

Location of teams in 2009 League of Ireland First Division
Locations of Dublin First Division teams

== Clubs ==
Team	Base	Manager	Stadium
Athlone Town	Athlone	(Republic of Ireland) Brendan Place	Athlone Town Stadium
Finn Harps	Ballybofey	(Republic of Ireland) James Gallagher	Finn Park
Kildare County	Newbridge	(Republic of Ireland) Joe Somerville	Station Road
Limerick	Limerick	(Republic of Ireland) Pat Scully	Jackman Park
Longford Town	Longford	(Republic of Ireland) Gareth Cronin	Flancare Park
Mervue United	Galway	(Republic of Ireland) Johnny Glynn	Terryland Park
Monaghan United	Monaghan	(Republic of Ireland) Mick Cooke	Century Homes Park
Shelbourne	Drumcondra	(Republic of Ireland) Dermot Keely	Tolka Park
Sporting Fingal	Fingal	(Republic of Ireland) Liam Buckley	Morton Stadium
UCD	Belfield	(Republic of Ireland) Martin Russell	UCD Bowl
Waterford United	Waterford	(Republic of Ireland) Stephen Henderson	Waterford RSC
Wexford Youths	Crossabeg	(Republic of Ireland) Mick Wallace	Ferrycarraig Park

== Overview ==
This season saw the division expanded from 10 to 12 clubs. This was because the 2009 Premier Division was reduced to 10 clubs. The regular season began on 6 March and concluded on 7 November. Each team played the other teams three times, totaling 33 games. UCD finished as champions and were automatically promoted to the Premier Division. There was no promotion/relegation play-off between the First Division and the A Championship this season. This was only because Kildare County, who finished bottom of the table, withdrew from the League of Ireland before the play-offs could be played.

== Final table ==
Pos	Team	Pld	W	D	L	GF	GA	GD	Pts	Qualification or relegation
1	UCD (C)	33	23	5	5	63	21	+42	74	Promoted to Premier Division
2	Shelbourne	33	22	7	4	66	31	+35	73	Lost promotion/relegation play off
3	Sporting Fingal (Note: Sporting Fingal qualified for the 2010–11 UEFA Europa League after winning the 2009 FAI Cup Final and were promoted to the Premier Division after winning the promotion/relegation play off.) (P)	33	21	6	6	68	28	+40	69	UEFA Europa League/Premier Division
4	Waterford United	33	20	6	7	51	21	+30	66	
5	Monaghan United	33	16	7	10	58	48	+10	55	
6	Wexford Youths	33	15	5	13	27	31	−4	50	
7	Limerick F.C. (Note: Limerick 37 F.C. changed their name to Limerick F.C.)	33	12	8	13	48	43	+5	44	
8	Finn Harps	33	8	9	16	35	51	−16	33	
9	Longford Town	33	8	4	21	46	61	−15	28	
10	Athlone Town	33	6	9	18	32	63	−31	27	
11	Mervue United	33	6	5	22	28	64	−36	23	
12	Kildare County (Note: Kildare County withdrew from league at end of season and did participate in promotion/relegation play off.)	33	4	3	26	25	85	−60	15	Withdrew from the league

Rules for classification: 1) points; 2) goal difference; 3) number of goals scored.
(C) Champions; (P) Promoted

== Results ==
=== Matches 1 to 22 ===
Home \ Away	ATH	FHA	KIL	LIM	LON	MER	MON	SHE	SFI	UCD	WAT	WEX
Athlone Town		2–2	3–1	0–2	2–5	2–2	2–3	2–2	1–2	0–1	1–2	0–1
Finn Harps	1–1		2–1	1–2	1–0	2–0	1–2	1–1	3–2	1–2	1–3	0–2
Kildare County	0–1	1–1		0–0	2–3	0–3	0–2	0–3	0–8	0–1	0–2	0–3
Limerick	0–0	1–1	3–0		1–4	4–1	0–0	0–1	1–4	0–0	0–2	2–0
Longford Town	0–1	0–0	4–0	2–3		3–0	3–3	0–2	1–3	0–3	1–3	0–1
Mervue United	0–1	1–1	1–4	1–0	3–2		1–5	0–1	1–1	1–2	0–2	0–0
Monaghan United	0–0	1–0	5–1	1–0	2–0	1–2		0–1	0–3	2–3	0–0	0–0
Shelbourne	2–0	2–1	2–0	1–0	2–2	7–0	2–1		1–0	1–3	1–0	2–1
Sporting Fingal	2–0	1–0	1–0	1–1	3–0	2–0	4–0	1–0		0–1	1–4	2–0
UCD	1–1	1–1	4–0	2–1	3–1	1–0	3–0	0–1	0–1		0–0	0–1
Waterford United	2–1	4–0	2–0	2–1	1–0	2–0	6–0	0–1	1–1	0–1		1–2
Wexford Youths	1–0	2–1	0–3	0–2	2–1	1–0	0–2	1–2	0–1	0–1	0–1	

Source: loi.ie
Legend: Blue = home team win; Yellow = draw; Red = away team win.

=== Matches 23 to 33 ===
Home \ Away	ATH	FHA	KIL	LIM	LON	MER	MON	SHE	SFI	UCD	WAT	WEX
Athlone Town		0–6	2–2				1–2			0–5	1–2	2–0
Finn Harps					1–0		0–2	1–3		0–5	1–1	
Kildare County		0–2				0–1		1–5	2–3			1–2
Limerick	6–1	3–0	2–3			2–1	3–3				2–1	
Longford Town	3–0		1–2	1–2			1–4		0–4			
Mervue United	3–1	0–1			0–1			2–4	1–4	1–2		
Monaghan United			6–1			4–2		0–3	2–2			3–0
Shelbourne	0–0			3–3	4–5					2–2		1–2
Sporting Fingal	2–3	4–1		2–1				2–2		1–0		0–1
UCD			5–0	2–1	2–1		3–0				2–3	2–0
Waterford United			2–0		1–0	1–0	0–2	0–1	0–0			
Wexford Youths		1–0		2–0	1–1	0–0					0–0	

Source: loi.ie
Legend: Blue = home team win; Yellow = draw; Red = away team win.

== Promotion/relegation play-offs ==
The second and third placed First Division teams, Shelbourne and Sporting Fingal played off to decide who would play the winner of the Premier Division play-off. The winner of this play off would play in the 2010 Premier Division.

First Division

10 November 2009	Shelbourne	1 – 2	Sporting Fingal	Tolka Park
19:45 GMT	McAllister 72' (pen.); Flood (red card) 73'	Report	Zayed 39'; Williams 41'	Attendance: 1,632; Referee: T. Connolly

First Division v Premier Division

13 November 2009	Sporting Fingal	2 – 0	Bray Wanderers	Morton Stadium
19:45 GMT	Paisley 51'; Byrne 67'	Report		Attendance: 740; Referee: D. Tomney

16 November 2009	Bray Wanderers	2 – 2	Sporting Fingal	Carlisle Grounds
19:45 GMT	Flood 83'; O'Connor 90+1'	Report	Zayed 59'; Bayly 90+2'	Referee: D. Hanney

Sporting Fingal won 4–2 on aggregate and were promoted to the Premier Division.

== Top scorers ==
Scorer	Team	Goals
(Republic of Ireland) Conan Byrne	Sporting Fingal	21
(Republic of Ireland) Karl Bermingham	Monaghan United	17
(Republic of Ireland) Graham Cummins	Waterford United	17
(Republic of Ireland) David McAllister	Shelbourne	16
(Republic of Ireland) Ciarán Kilduff	UCD	14
(Republic of Ireland) Stephen O'Flynn	Limerick F.C.	14

== See also ==
- 2009 League of Ireland Premier Division
- 2009 League of Ireland Cup
- 2009 A Championship
