= 2010 A Championship Cup =

Newstalk Cup

Tournament details
- Country: Republic of Ireland
- Teams: 18

Final positions
- Champions: Sporting Fingal A
- Runners-up: Bohemians A

Tournament statistics
- Matches played: 35

The 2010 A Championship Cup was a one-off cup competition featuring teams that played in the 2010 A Championship. It was also referred to as the Newstalk Cup for sponsorship reasons. It was won by Sporting Fingal A, who defeated Bohemians A in the final.

== Procedure ==
There were eighteen participating clubs in the 2010 Newstalk Cup; they were divided into four groups - five teams in Pool 2 and Pool 3 and four teams in Pool 1 and Pool 4. All the teams played each other once and the group winners then advanced to the semi-finals.

Teams received three points for a win and one point for a draw. No points were awarded for a loss. Teams were ranked by total points, then goal difference and then goals scored.

== Season ==
=== Pool 1 ===
Pos	Team	Pld	W	D	L	GF	GA	GD	Pts	CAS	SLI	GAL	FHA
1	Castlebar Celtic (A)	3	2	0	1	11	5	+6	6		2–3		7–2
2	Sligo Rovers A	3	2	0	1	4	3	+1	6			0–1	
3	Galway United A	3	1	0	2	2	6	−4	3	0–2			
4	Finn Harps A	3	1	0	2	6	9	−3	3		0–1	4–1	

Source: loi.ie
Legend: Blue = home team win; Yellow = draw; Red = away team win.
Rules for classification: 1) points; 2) goal difference; 3) number of goals scored.
(A) Advanced to semi-finals

=== Pool 2 ===
Pos	Team	Pld	W	D	L	GF	GA	GD	Pts	SFI	SHA	UCD	DUN	DRO
1	Sporting Fingal A (A)	4	4	0	0	14	4	+10	12				6–2	2–0
2	Shamrock Rovers A	4	1	2	1	7	6	+1	5	1–2		2–2		
3	UCD A	4	1	2	1	6	8	−2	5	1–4			2–2	
4	Dundalk A	4	0	3	1	7	11	−4	3		2–2			1–1
5	Drogheda United A	4	0	1	3	1	6	−5	1		0–2	0–1		

Source: loi.ie
Legend: Blue = home team win; Yellow = draw; Red = away team win.
Rules for classification: 1) points; 2) goal difference; 3) number of goals scored.
(A) Advanced to semi-finals

=== Pool 3 ===
Pos	Team	Pld	W	D	L	GF	GA	GD	Pts	BOH	StP	BRW	SHB	TUL
1	Bohemians A (A)	4	3	1	0	11	3	+8	10				2–0	4–0
2	St Patrick's Athletic A	4	2	2	0	10	4	+6	8	1–1		5–2		
3	Bray Wanderers A	4	2	0	2	12	10	+2	6	2–4				4–0
4	Shelbourne A	4	0	2	2	4	9	−5	2		1–1	1–4		
5	Tullamore Town	4	0	1	3	2	13	−11	1		0–3		2–2	

Source: loi.ie
Legend: Blue = home team win; Yellow = draw; Red = away team win.
Rules for classification: 1) points; 2) goal difference; 3) number of goals scored.
(A) Advanced to semi-finals

=== Pool 4 ===
Pos	Team	Pld	W	D	L	GF	GA	GD	Pts	CAR	TRA	COB	LIM
1	F.C. Carlow (A)	3	2	1	0	4	2	+2	7		1–1	2–1	
2	Tralee Dynamos	3	1	2	0	4	3	+1	5				2–1
3	Cobh Ramblers	3	1	1	1	4	4	0	4		1–1		2–1
4	Limerick A	3	0	0	3	2	5	−3	0	0–1			

Source: loi.ie
Legend: Blue = home team win; Yellow = draw; Red = away team win.
Rules for classification: 1) points; 2) goal difference; 3) number of goals scored.
(A) Advanced to semi-finals

=== Semi-finals ===
Fixtures were played on 8 May and 2 June 2010.

Tie no	Home team	Score	Away team	Report
1	Bohemians A	3 – 0	Castlebar Celtic	
2	F.C. Carlow	2 – 2 AET	Sporting Fingal A	
Sporting Fingal A won 2 – 3 on penalties

=== Final ===
24 August 2010
19.30 IST

Bohemians A	2 – 3	Sporting Fingal A
Gary Burke 14' 67'	Report	Éamon Zayed 48'; Glen Crowe 61' 81'

Dalymount Park, Dublin

== See also ==
- 2010 A Championship
