= F.C. Carlow =

- Full name: Football Club Carlow
- Nickname: The Barrowsiders
- Founded: 2008
- Dissolved: 2011
- Ground: Hawkins Lane; The Valley; The Meadows (2011)
- League: A Championship; League of Ireland U20/U19 Division
Home colours	Away colours

F.C. Carlow (Irish: Cumann Peile Ceatharlach) was an Irish association football club based in County Carlow. Between 2009 and 2011 the club played in the A Championship. They also fielded teams in the League of Ireland U20/U19 Division. They were the first and to date so far, the only association football club from County Carlow to play in a senior national level league. During this time, the club also competed in the FAI Cup, the League of Ireland Cup and the Leinster Senior Cup.

== History ==
=== South East Development Academy ===
F.C. Carlow originated from the South East Development Academy, a youth football academy that recruited players from counties Carlow, Wicklow and Wexford. During the mid-2000s the academy entered teams in the Foyle Cup and the Galway Cup, playing against youth teams representing Celtic F.C., Bohemians, Calgary Foothills F.C. and the Republic of Ireland U15s. In 2007 the academy announced their plans to enter a team in the League of Ireland U20 Division, using the name South East F.C., however they subsequently entered the division under the name F.C. Carlow. On 28 September 2008 the club made their debut in the U20 Division with a home game against Cobh Ramblers.

=== A Championship ===
Between 2009 and 2011, F.C. Carlow played in the A Championship. On April 5, 2009, F.C. Carlow made their debut in the A Championship with a 1–1 home draw against Cork City A. During this time, the club also competed in the FAI Cup, the League of Ireland Cup and the Leinster Senior Cup. In 2010 they were semi-finalists in the A Championship Cup, losing out after extra time and penalties to the eventual winners Sporting Fingal A. Following the demise of the A Championship, F.C. Carlow subsequently played one season in the new League of Ireland U19 Division.

== Grounds ==
F.C. Carlow played their home games at various grounds throughout County Carlow. These included grounds that were regularly used by clubs that played in the Carlow & District Football League. During the 2008–09 season, when the club played in the League of Ireland U20 Division, F.C. Carlow played at Hawkins Lane in Tullow. This was the home of Parkville United. While playing in the A Championship they played at The Valley on Fenagh Road in Ballon at the home of Burrin Celtic. During the 2011 season they also played games at The Meadows in Graiguecullen, the home of St Patrick's Boys.
