= Robbie Doyle =

Irish footballer (born 1982)

Personal information
- Full name: Robert Doyle
- Date of birth: 22 April 1982 (age 44)
- Place of birth: Dublin, Ireland
- Position: Forward

Youth career
- 1998–2001: Blackburn Rovers

Senior career*
Years	Team	Apps	(Gls)
2001–2002	Bray Wanderers	8	(1)
2002–2003	UCD	24	(7)
2003–2004	Bohemians	44	(9)
2004–2005	St Patrick's Athletic	42	(12)
2006	Bray Wanderers	21	(1)
2006–2007	Macclesfield Town	2	(0)
2007	Dundalk	17	(6)
2008–2009	Sporting Fingal	42	(19)
2010	Bray Wanderers	20	(2)
Total		220	(57)

International career
2002	Republic of Ireland U21	1	(0)
1999	Republic of Ireland U17	2	(0)
- * Club domestic league appearances and goals

Robbie Doyle (born 22 April 1982, Bray) is an Irish retired soccer player.

== Career ==
The "journeyman" started his career with Blackburn Rovers spending 3 years at the club.

He returned home to sign for his home town club Bray Wanderers in time for the 2001/02 season making his League of Ireland debut as a substitute at Tolka Park on 9 November. He made a handful of appearances at the club when Paul Doolin offered him regular first team football at UCD and so Doyle was on his way again. He scored on his debut for UCD on the first day of the 2002/03 season against Bohemians and his performances that season impressed Stephen Kenny enough to offer him a move to Bohemians at the end of the season. Doyle made a decent start to life at Dalymount and played in all of Bohs' four 2003–04 UEFA Champions League qualifiers but he fell out with Kenny and in mid-2004, he returned once again to St Patrick's Athletic. He has since played for Bray Wanderers (again) and Macclesfield Town.

On 4 July 2007, Doyle agreed to sign for Dundalk from Macclesfield Town. He was released at the end of the 2007 season by Dundalk and signed for Sporting Fingal F.C. at the start of the 2008 season and ended the season as First Division top scorer. Fingal achieved promotion to the Premier Division in 2009 and better was to come as Fingal and Doyle won the FAI Cup when beating Sligo Rovers 2–1 at Tallaght Stadium.

On 4 March 2010 he re-signed for Bray Wanderers. In his three spells at his hometown club Doyle scored 5 goals in 59 total appearances.

== International career ==
He has also represented Ireland at Under-15, Under-16, Under-17, Under-18 and Under-21 levels. He got his only U21 cap in Finland in 2002.

Playing for Ardmore Rovers he was part of the team that won the Nordic Cup in August 1998 scoring the winner against Iceland and Norway. Then scoring the opening goal in the final win over England.

He scored twice against France while playing for Ireland Under 17s.

== Personal life ==
In April 2005 Doyle's older brother Richie died suddenly of Sudden unexpected death syndrome.

Since 2011, Doyle has participated in various advertising campaigns nationwide as a male model. In particular, he featured heavily in BMW's Winter 2011 advertisement. He currently resides in the seaside village of Greystones, County Wicklow, living with his wife Nikki and their daughter Nahla. In addition to his modelling and past football experience, he is also known as a very talented singer songwriter.
