= Gary Twigg =

Scottish footballer (born 1984)

Personal information
- Full name: Gary Twigg
- Date of birth: 19 March 1984 (age 42)
- Place of birth: Glasgow, Scotland
- Position: Striker

Youth career
- 2000–2002: Derby County

Senior career*
Years	Team	Apps	(Gls)
2002–2005	Derby County	9	(0)
2003	→ Burton Albion (loan)	4	(1)
2004	→ Bristol Rovers (loan)	8	(0)
2005–2007	Airdrie United	57	(17)
2007	Oxford United	9	(3)
2008	Hamilton Academical	3	(0)
2008–2009	Brechin City	23	(12)
2009–2012	Shamrock Rovers	119	(81)
2013–2016	Portadown	114	(53)
2016–2017	Coleraine	6	(4)
Total		392	(178)
- * Club domestic league appearances and goals

Gary Twigg (born 19 March 1984) is a Scottish former association footballer who played as a forward.

== Career ==
=== Derby County ===
Twigg began his career in 2000 with English club Derby County, having graduated through the youth system. He made his debut for Derby at the age of 17 as a striker in a Premier League match against Sunderland in May 2002, his only appearance that season. In the 2002–03 season, he made eight first-team appearances, seven as a substitute, branching out into the position of left wing when needed.

==== Loan to Burton Albion ====
In September 2003 he joined Burton Albion on loan, for whom he made four appearances.

=== Airdrie United ===
Having been released by Derby, and following an unsuccessful trial period at League of Ireland club Derry City, he placed roots at Airdrie United in August 2005, where he went on to make 65 league and cup appearances in two years, scoring 18 goals. He won the SFL Player of the Month award for December 2006 after scoring six goals in six games, helping Airdrie to only one defeat out of six league games.

=== Oxford United ===
Twigg signed a two-year contract with Conference National side Oxford United on 5 July 2007. Nick Merry, Oxford United chairman, said, "He's got a good record and he's very versatile too. He can play wide or down the middle and he'll be a good asset to us." He came on as a substitute on the opening day of the 2007–08 season at home against Forest Green Rovers in which he won and scored a stoppage time penalty to win the game for Oxford on his debut. An ankle injury that required surgery in October led to him missing seven weeks of the season before he returned to the side in December. However, he was unable to settle and left at the end of December to seek a move back to Scotland. He had made 11 league and cup appearances, scoring three goals.

=== Hamilton Academical ===
Twigg signed for Hamilton Academical on an 18-month contract in January 2008. He made only four appearances and was transfer listed at the end of the season. His contract was cancelled at Twigg's request in July 2008 as he had a falling out with the manager Billy Reid. Twigg then signed for Brechin City in July 2008,

=== Shamrock Rovers ===
In February 2009, he followed manager Michael O'Neill from Brechin to Shamrock Rovers, signing for a fee of €15,000. He scored on his debut in a friendly at Athlone Town

Twigg made his League of Ireland debut on the opening day of the 2009 League of Ireland season at Bray Wanderers. He then scored the first ever goal in the Tallaght Stadium in a 2–1 win for Shamrock Rovers over Sligo Rovers in March 2009. Twigg scored his 22nd league goal in a 2–1 win over Sligo Rovers. He scored his 23rd league goal at Dundalk, equalling Stephen Geoghegan's total from the 1993/94 season. Gary was awarded the League of Ireland Player of the Month for September 2009. Twigg finished the 2009 season as the top scorer in the League of Ireland with 24 goals. He also won the club Player of the Year voted by Rovers fans and the PFAI Player of the Year voted for by his fellow players across the league.

He scored his tenth league goal of the 2010 season in a 3–0 defeat of Bohemians on 8 August. That night he was presented with the League of Ireland 2009 Player of the Year award. He scored his 50th goal in total for the club in a 2–2 draw with Bray Wanderers. The result was enough for Rovers to win the 2010 League of Ireland title, their first league title in 16 years. Twigg again finished the season as the top scorer in the League of Ireland with 20 goals.

In 2011, he was again Rovers' top league goalscorer with 15 goals, helping the club to their 17th title. Twigg also played on the Shamrock Rovers team that was the first Irish club to reach the group stages of the UEFA Europa League.

In March 2012 he was awarded his third Airtricity/SWAI Player of the Month.

In October 2012 Shamrock Rovers announced that Twigg would not be signing a new contract and would be leaving at the end of the 2012 season. Twigg again finished the season as top scorer for the third time in his four seasons in the League of Ireland. He scored a total of 88 goals in 160 appearances for The Hoops. These included 15 appearances in the UEFA Champions League qualifiers and the Europa League. His 81 league goals makes Twigg the eighth highest goalscorer in the history of Shamrock Rovers. For the fourth time he was awarded the SWAI Player of the Month for October

=== Portadown ===
Twigg signed for NIFL Premiership side Portadown on 29 October 2012 on a three-and-a-half-year deal. Twigg scored on his debut for Portadown in a match against Donegal Celtic at Shamrock Park on 5 January 2013, finishing the season with six goals from 11 league games.

Gary scored his first hat-trick for Portadown on 7 September 2013, during an 11–0 hammering of Ballinamallard United.

=== Coleraine ===
Twigg had signed a pre-contract agreement with Ballymena United with a view to joining the Sky Blues at the start of the 2016–17 NIFL Premiership season. However, the arrival of David Jeffrey as manager coincided with the cancellation of this pre-contract agreement on 1 April 2016.

On 16 July 2016 it was announced that Twigg had rejected the offer of a new contract from Portadown and would be signing for Ballymena's derby rivals Coleraine.

== Honours ==
=== Club ===
Shamrock Rovers

- League of Ireland Premier Division (2): 2010, 2011
- Setanta Sports Cup (1): 2011

=== Individual ===
- PFAI Players' Player of the Year (1): 2009
- Shamrock Rovers Player of the Year (1): 2009
- NIFL Player of the Month (1): September 2013
