= Gerry Gannon =

Irish builder and property developer

- Born: County Roscommon, Ireland
- Occupations: Builder, property developer
- Years active: 1980s–present
- Organizations: Structural Developments Ltd, Noteworthy Ltd, Gannon Homes
- Known for: Major housing developments in North Dublin; involvement in Anglo Irish Bank controversy; member of the Maple 10
- Notable work: Malahide Marina, Belcamp, Clongriffin, Castle Village (Celbridge), Brackenstown (Swords)
- Spouse: Margaret Gannon
- Children: 5 (including Emma † and Peter †)

Gerry Gannon is an Irish builder and property developer since the 1980s. Gannon played a significant role in the Irish construction industry in the lead up the bursting of the Irish property bubble. Gannon was one of the key figures involved in the Anglo Irish Bank hidden loans controversy, which was a contributing element in the development of the post-2008 Irish banking crisis.

Gannon is best known for large housing and apartment developments in North County Dublin particularly those around Malahide Marina in the early 1990s and later around Belcamp and Clongriffin in the early 2000s.

Gannon has sometimes been referred to in the Irish media as "the man in the hat".

== Early and personal life ==
Gannon is a native of County Roscommon. Married to Margaret, the couple had one son and four daughters. Their daughter Emma died aged 6, whilst their adult son Peter died on 8 July 2013.

Gannon started his builder activities in the 1980s in London while working for his father's construction firm. Gannon and Michael Smurfit jointly owned the Kildare Hotel and Golf Club, known as the K Club, until Smurfit purchased Gannon's 49% stake for €40 million in 2012 via NAMA.

== Building activity ==
In 1986, through the firm Structural Developments Ltd, Gannon built a development at Castle Village in Celbridge. In 1988, through another firm – Noteworthy Limited – with partner Michael Anglim, Gannon planned to build 710 houses at Brackenstown close to Swords. At the time, it was one of the largest schemes submitted to Dublin County Council. Permission was granted for the scheme in October 1988. The scheme at the time was said to be worth upwards of £40 million. The site on which the houses were built was bought by Noteworthy Ltd as a parcel of land in 1987. The land was zoned for residential purposes in 1983 against the recommendation of the council's planning officials. In April 1990, Gannon, now trading through Gannon Homes, sought permission for a £70m residential scheme and a shopping centre on a 110-acre site on the Malahide Road. The scheme involved 915 houses on a 95-acre site fronting the Malahide Road and the Hole in the Wall road at Ayrfield. They also lodged planning applications for a drive-in restaurant, a pub and a library. The firm bought the land from two sites. The 95 acres were bought from Abbey Group and the 15-acre site was the site of the former Clare Manor Hotel.

Gannon has owned the Ericsson R&D facility, in Athlone, County Westmeath, for several years. In 2017 it was reported that it would be offered for sale for more than €19m.

== Maple 10, Anglo 10 or the Golden Circle ==
The 'Maple 10', also known as the 'Anglo 10' or the 'Golden Circle', was a group of Irish investors. The Maple 10, besides Gerry Gannon, included Jackson O'Sullivan, John McCabe, Paddy McKillen, Jerry Conlan, Joe O’Reilly, Patrick Kearney, Brian O’Farrell, Gerry Maguire and Sean Reilly. In 2010, the Irish Director of Public Prosecutions (DPP) examined a file on Anglo's "Maple 10" deals.

== Transfer of assets to wife Margaret ==
As reported by the Irish Independent in February 2011, "a portfolio of properties worth about €12m was transferred into the name of developer Gerry Gannon's wife, Margaret, between 21 May and 10 December 2009".
