= John Mulroy (footballer) =

Irish footballer

John Mulroy (born 27 December 1989) is an Irish former footballer who played as a forward for Bray Wanderers and Athlone Town. He scored in the semi-final of the 2009 FAI Cup. He was Bray's youngest ever player to score in a first-team match.
