= 2009 FAI Cup final =

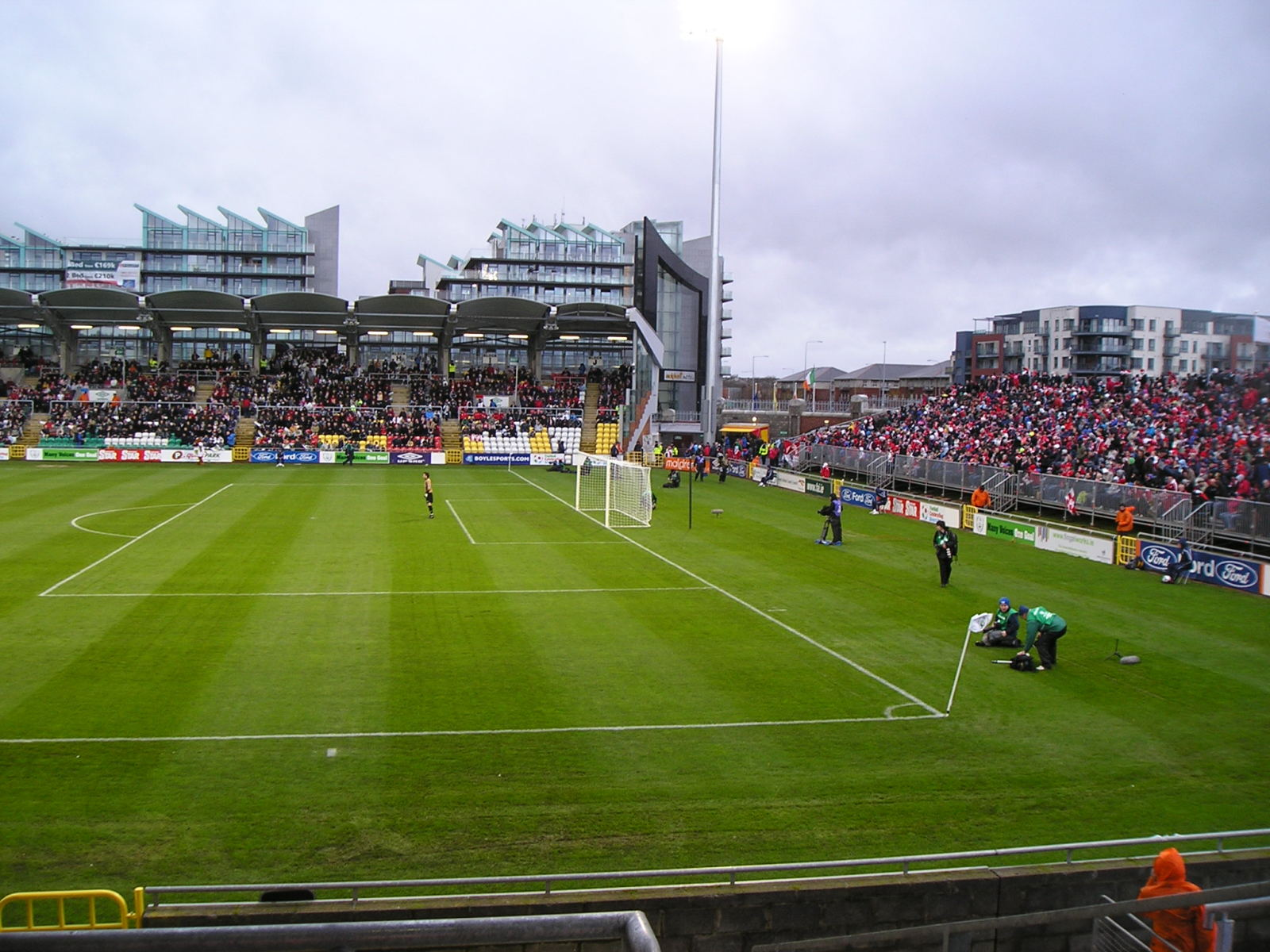
- Event: 2009 FAI Cup
Sligo Rovers	Sporting Fingal
1	2
- Date: 22 November 2009
- Venue: Tallaght Stadium, Dublin
- Referee: Alan Kelly
- Attendance: 8,105

The 2009 FAI Cup final was the final match of the 2009 FAI Cup and was contested by Sligo Rovers and Sporting Fingal. Fingal were 2–1 winners in only their second year in the League of Ireland. The game took place at the Tallaght Stadium on 22 November 2009. Alan Kelly refereed the game in front of 8,105 people.

== Match details ==
22 November 2009
15.00 GMT

Sligo Rovers	1 – 2	Sporting Fingal
Eoin Doyle 57'	Report	Colm James 85' (pen.); Gary O'Neill 90'

Tallaght Stadium, Dublin
Attendance: 8,105
Referee: Alan Kelly (Cork)

Sligo Rovers	Sporting Fingal
