= 2009 FAI Cup =

FAI Ford Cup

Tournament details
- Country: Ireland

Final positions
- Champions: Sporting Fingal
- Runners-up: Sligo Rovers

The FAI Cup 2009 was the 89th season of the national football competition of Ireland. It began on the weekend ending 26 April 2009 and ended on 22 November 2009 with the final taking place for the first time at Tallaght Stadium. The winner - Sporting Fingal - earned spots in both the second qualifying round of the 2010–11 UEFA Europa League and the 2010 Setanta Sports Cup.

== First round ==
The first round matches were played on the weekend ending 26 April 2009.

Team 1	Score	Team 2
Castlebar Celtic	8–1	Ringmahon Rangers
Glenmore Dundrum	1–6	St Mary's
Rockmount	1–1	Malahide United
St Peter's	0–1	Bluebell United
Tralee Dynamos	2–0	Clonmel Town
Tullamore Town	0–0	Carrigaline United

=== First round replays ===
The matches were played on the weekend ending 3 May 2009.

Team 1	Score	Team 2
Carrigaline United	2–1	Tullamore Town
Malahide United	1–0	Rockmount

== Second round ==
The matches were played on the weekend ending 24 May 2009.

Team 1	Score	Team 2
Blarney United FC	2–1	F.C. Carlow
Bluebell United	2–1	Malahide United
Cobh Ramblers	1–2	Carrigaline United
Crumlin United	3–0	Kildrum Tigers
Erris United	2–4	Cherry Orchard
Fanad United	2–2	Ballymun United
Mayfield United	3–2	Castlebar Celtic
Salthill Devon	3–1	Newtown Rangers
Tralee Dynamos	1–0	St Mary's
UCD Reserves	1–2	Arklow Town

=== Second round replay ===
The match was played on 31 May 2009.

Team 1	Score	Team 2
Ballymun United	3–0	Fanad United

== Third round ==
The matches were played between 9 and 14 June 2009.

Team 1	Score	Team 2
Blarney United	0–2	Sporting Fingal
Bohemians	8–1	Mayfield United
Bray Wanderers	2–1	Bluebell United
Cherry Orchard	2–2	Monaghan United
Cork City	2–2	Sligo Rovers
Crumlin United	1–1	Shelbourne
Derry City	6–0	Ballymun United
Finn Harps	0–3	Galway United
Kildare County	1–2	Athlone Town
Limerick	0–1	St. Patrick's Athletic
Mervue United	1–3	Dundalk
Shamrock Rovers	1–1	Drogheda United
Tralee Dynamos	2–1	Salthill Devon
UCD	3–1	Arklow Town
Waterford United	6–0	Carrigaline United
Wexford Youths	2–2	Longford Town

=== Third round replays ===
The matches were played between 15 and 17 June 2009.

Team 1	Score	Team 2
Drogheda United	0–3	Shamrock Rovers
Longford Town	3–2 (a.e.t.)	Wexford Youths
Monaghan United	4–0	Cherry Orchard
Shelbourne	0–1	Crumlin United
Sligo Rovers	2–1 (a.e.t.)	Cork City

== Fourth round ==
The matches were played the weekend ending 16 August 2009.

Team 1	Score	Team 2
Bray Wanderers	2–0	Tralee Dynamos
Crumlin United	0–0	Waterford United
Dundalk	0–0	Bohemians
Galway United	0–1	Longford Town
Monaghan United	0–0	St Patrick's Athletic
Shamrock Rovers	3–1	University College Dublin
Sligo Rovers	1–0	Derry City
Sporting Fingal	4–1	Athlone Town

=== Fourth round replays ===
The matches were played between 18 August and 7 September 2009.

Team 1	Score	Team 2
Waterford United	2–0	Crumlin United
Bohemians	0–0 (4–2 p)	Dundalk
St Patrick's Athletic	1–0 (a.e.t.)	Monaghan United

== Quarter finals ==
The matches were played between 11–12 September 2009.

Team 1	Score	Team 2
Bohemians	0–0	Sligo Rovers
Sporting Fingal	2–2	Shamrock Rovers
Waterford United	1–1	St Patrick's Athletic
Longford Town	0–0	Bray Wanderers

=== Quarter final replays ===
The matches were played on Tuesday 15 September 2009.

Team 1	Score	Team 2
Sligo Rovers	2–1	Bohemians
Shamrock Rovers	1–2 (a.e.t.)	Sporting Fingal
St Patrick's Athletic	0–2	Waterford United
Bray Wanderers	2–1	Longford Town

== Semi finals ==
The semi-final draw took place on Monday, 21 September.

23 October 2009
19:35 IST

Sligo Rovers	1–0	Waterford United
Matthew Blinkhorn 76'	Report

The Showgrounds, Sligo
Referee: D. Hancock

25 October 2009
16:05 GMT

Sporting Fingal	4–2	Bray Wanderers
Éamon Zayed 4' 11'; Alan Kirby 22'; Robert Bayly 83'	Report	Gary McCabe 74'; John Mulroy 90'; Chris Deans (red card) 81'

Morton Stadium, Santry
Referee: A. Kelly

== Final ==
22 November 2009
15:00 GMT

Sligo Rovers	1–2	Sporting Fingal
Eoin Doyle 57'	Report	Colm James 85' (pen.); Gary O'Neill 90'

Tallaght Stadium, Dublin
Attendance: 8,105
Referee: Alan Kelly (Cork)
