= Sporting Fingal F.C. =

Sporting Fingal
- Full name: Sporting Fingal Football Club
- Founded: 2007
- Dissolved: 2011
- Ground: Morton Stadium
- Owner(s): Gerry Gannon; Fingal County Council
- Chairman: Gerry Gannon
- Manager: Liam Buckley
- League: League of Ireland Premier Division; League of Ireland First Division; A Championship
- Website: www.sportingfingal.ie
Home colours	Away colours

Sporting Fingal Football Club was an Irish association football club based in Fingal. Between 2008 and 2010, the club played three seasons in the League of Ireland. During their first two seasons they played in the First Division before winning promotion to the Premier Division. During the 2009 and 2010 seasons, the club also entered a team in the A Championship. During their short stay in the League of Ireland, Sporting Fingal were relatively successful. As well as gaining promotion to the Premier Division, they also won both the 2009 FAI Cup and the 2010 A Championship Cup and qualified for the UEFA Europa League on two occasions. In addition to fielding teams in the League of Ireland, Sporting Fingal also organised Powerchair Football, Special Olympics football and futsal teams. Their futsal team won the 2010 FAI Futsal Cup and qualified for the 2010–11 UEFA Futsal Cup.

== History ==
=== Community football club ===
Sporting Fingal F.C. was established in 2007 as a joint initiative involving both Fingal County Council and the property developer Gerry Gannon. John O'Brien, the senior executive officer with the council, proposed forming a community football club and Gannon became involved after the council advertised for investors. Gannon would become the club's majority shareholder while the council maintained a 26% stake. Liam Buckley was also involved in forming the club and subsequently served as both the director of football and club manager. Sporting Fingal F.C. was set up as a limited company on 19 November 2007 and the club was officially launched in February 2008 at an event attended by among others, Johnny Giles and Brian Lenihan. At its launch the club also announced its ambitions to set up an academy and build its own stadium. The club also announced details about other backers and sponsors which included Keelings Group Ltd, a Fingal-based fruit and vegetable supplier, Anglo Irish Bank and Dublin Airport Authority. In addition to fielding teams in the League of Ireland, Sporting Fingal also organised Powerchair Football, Special Olympics football and futsal teams. In 2009 Sporting Fingal EID joined the Emerald Futsal League and in 2010 won the FAI Futsal Cup. Sporting Fingal won the cup after defeating Blue Magic 4–2 in the final. This led to Sporting representing the Republic of Ireland in the 2010–11 UEFA Futsal Cup.

=== League of Ireland ===
Sporting Fingal successfully applied to join the League of Ireland and were initially expected to join the A Championship. However following the demise of Kilkenny City, the club were subsequently invited to join the First Division. Sporting Fingal made their League of Ireland debut on 8 March 2008 with a 5–1 defeat against Longford Town at Flancare Park. Peter Hynes scored Sporting's first goal in a competitive game. Despite their poor start, Sporting eventually finished fourth in the 2008 First Division. Robbie Doyle also emerged as the First Division top scorer. Sporting had a very successful 2009 season. After finishing third during the regular season, they gained promotion to the 2010 Premier Division after defeating Bray Wanderers 4–2 on aggregate in a promotion-relegation play-off. For a second season in a row a Sporting player, this time Conan Byrne, finished as the First Division top scorer. Sporting also won the 2009 FAI Cup after defeating Sligo Rovers 2–1 in the final. In doing so they also qualified for the 2010–11 UEFA Europa League. Sporting finished fourth in the 2010 Premier Division and as a result qualified for both the 2011 Setanta Sports Cup and the 2011–12 UEFA Europa League. Their reserve team also won the 2010 A Championship Cup, defeating Bohemians A 3–2 in the final.

=== Europe ===
==== 2010–11 UEFA Europa League ====
After winning the 2009 FAI Cup, Sporting Fingal qualified for the 2010–11 UEFA Europa League. Sporting played Marítimo in the second qualifying round and were defeated 6–4 on aggregate. After finishing fourth in the 2010 Premier Division, Sporting Fingal also qualified for the 2011–12 UEFA Europa League. However after the club disbanded in early 2011 they were replaced in the competition by St Patrick's Athletic.

Second qualifying round

15 July 2010	Marítimo (Portugal)	3 – 2	(Republic of Ireland) Sporting Fingal	Estádio da Madeira
20:45	Esteves 78'; Cherrad 85'; Tchô 90+5'	Report	Crowe 33'; Fitzgerald 87'	Attendance: 1,961; Referee: Luc Wilmes (Luxembourg)

22 July 2010	Sporting Fingal (Republic of Ireland)	2 – 3	(Portugal) Marítimo	Dalymount Park
20:45	Zayed 81', 89'	Report	Alonso 20' (pen.); Marquinho 67'; Kanu 86'	Attendance: 2,150; Referee: Marco Borg (Malta)

Marítimo won 6–4 on aggregate.

=== Demise ===
Sporting Fingal's demise was triggered by the collapse of the Irish property bubble. Three of the club's main backers – Gerry Gannon, Dublin Airport Authority and Anglo Irish Bank – were involved in the Anglo Irish Bank hidden loans controversy. The National Asset Management Agency placed restrictions on Gannon's business activities and on 26 November 2010 he resigned as Sporting Fingal's chairman, ending his involvement with the club. Gannon had been the club's main benefactor. In 2008 he made the club a "sponsorship payment" of €499,900 and in 2009 he also made a €750,000 "non-refundable contribution". Some reports estimated that Gannon invested more than €2m into the club. Despite this, however, Sporting posted a loss of more than €75,000 in 2009. The club were unable to find a replacement for Gannon and in February 2011 Sporting Fingal revealed it had serious financial problems when they were unable to pay their players' wages. This resulted in the club having to cancel the contracts of their playing squad. On 14 February they were due to play Lisburn Distillery in the first round of the 2011 Setanta Sports Cup; however, they had to withdraw from the competition and were replaced by UCD. The club also withdrew its application for a licence to participate in the 2011 Premier Division. Drogheda United, who were originally relegated at the end of the 2010 Premier Division season, subsequently retained their place in the Premier Division after Sporting withdrew.

== Grounds ==
Sporting Fingal's first team played their home First Division and Premier Division games at Morton Stadium. Their A Championship team played their home games at the ALSAA Sports Complex, near Dublin Airport. The club also used ALSAA as their main training facility. Sporting played their 2010–11 UEFA Europa League home game against Marítimo at Dalymount Park and, before their demise, they intended to move to the same stadium for the 2011 season. In the long term Sporting Fingal planned to play at the Fingal Sports Complex.

== Notable former players ==
=== Internationals ===
Republic of Ireland international

- (Republic of Ireland) Glen Crowe
- (Republic of Ireland) Shaun Williams

League of Ireland XI representatives

- (Republic of Ireland) Ger O'Brien
- (Republic of Ireland) Alan Kirby
- (Republic of Ireland) Shaun Williams
- (Republic of Ireland) (Libya) Éamon Zayed

Republic of Ireland U23 internationals

- (Republic of Ireland) Kenny Browne
- (Republic of Ireland) Brendan Clarke
- (Republic of Ireland) Ronan Finn
- (Republic of Ireland) Ross Gaynor
- (Republic of Ireland) Ger O'Brien
- (Republic of Ireland) Shaun Williams

Republic of Ireland U21 internationals

- (Republic of Ireland) Jim Crawford
- (Republic of Ireland) Robbie Doyle
- (Republic of Ireland) Barry Ferguson
- (Republic of Ireland) Colin Hawkins
- (Republic of Ireland) Alan Kirby
- (Republic of Ireland) Shane McFaul
- (Republic of Ireland) Stephen Paisley
- (Republic of Ireland) Éamon Zayed

Republic of Ireland U19 internationals

- (Republic of Ireland) Robert Bayly
- (Republic of Ireland) John Frost

Republic of Ireland U18 international

- (Republic of Ireland) Kevin Dawson

Libya international

- (Libya) Éamon Zayed

Wales U21 international

- (Wales) Steve Williams

Latvia U19 international

- (Latvia) Igors Labuts

=== Goalscorers ===
First Division Top Scorer

Season	Player	Goals
2008	(Republic of Ireland) Robbie Doyle	17
2009	(Republic of Ireland) Conan Byrne	21

== Honours ==
- FAI Cup
  - 2009: 1
- A Championship Cup
  - 2010: 1
- FAI Futsal Cup
  - 2010: 1
