= 2012 St Patrick's Athletic F.C. season =

St Patrick's Athletic F.C.
2012 season
- Chairman: (Republic of Ireland) Garrett Kelleher
- Manager: (Republic of Ireland) Liam Buckley
- Stadium: Richmond Park
- Premier Division: 3rd
- FAI Cup: Runners up
- League of Ireland Cup: Quarter-finals
- Leinster Senior Cup: Quarter-finals
- Setanta Cup: First round
- UEFA Europa League: Third Qualifying Round
- Top goalscorer: League: Christy Fagan, (13); All: Christy Fagan, (18)
- Highest home attendance: 4236 vs Hannover 96 (2 August 2012)
- Lowest home attendance: 300 (est) vs Phoenix (12 March 2012)
| Home colours | Away colours |

The 2012 season was St. Patrick's Athletic F.C.'s 83rd year in existence and it was the Supersaint's 61st consecutive season in the top-flight of Irish football. The Saint's were under the new management of Liam Buckley after Pete Mahon was let go at the end of the 2011 season. Pat's finished 4th the previous season and doing so qualified for the 2012–13 UEFA Europa League First qualifying round. The Saints also competed in domestic competitions such as the FAI Cup, Setanta Cup, Leinster Senior Cup, and the EA Sports Cup.

== Friendlies and Setanta Cup exit ==
After appointing Liam Buckley as the new manager, Buckley wasted no time in changing the squad by bringing in fourteen fresh faces and only keeping five players from the squad last season. New faces included Christy Fagan from Bohemians, James Chambers from Hamilton and old saint Brendan Clarke back to the club from Sligo Rovers. Despite the new signings, Pat's also lost crucial players such as top scorer from last season Danny North to Sligo Rovers, Gary Rogers to Sligo Rovers also, Stephen Bradley to Limerick F.C. and Daryl Kavanagh to arch-rivals Shamrock Rovers.

The Supersaints started their pre-season programme when they cruised to a 2–0 win over non-league side Glebe North in Balbriggan with goals coming from new midfield signings Greg Bolger and Mark Rossiter. Pats played a behind closed doors friendly with the side they share training facilities with, Phoenix and won 2–1 with goals coming from James Chambers and Mark Rossiter at Scribblestown, near Blanchardstown. Liam Buckley's side then played a relatively trouble free 2–0 win over First Division Longford Town at Richmond Park with goals from defender Conor Kenna and new signing Kenny Browne seeing of the First Division side. After a good start to their pre-season, Pat's suffered an early exit from Setanta Cup with a two nil aggregate score line defeat to Cliftonville. Despite this defeat Pat's won their next pre-season friendly against Mervue 1–0 with Sean O'Connor scoring the winner early in the game.

On 27 August, the Saints again faced Longford Town in a mid-season friendly. Pats played a starting 11 of players who were aiming to regain their places in the regular starting line up. Longford found themselves being dominated throughout the entire game, although they took the lead just before half time through a wonder strike. Chris Deans was sent off for a poorly timed challenge on the edge of his box on Darren Meenan early into the second half. Jake Kelly's low shot was saved onto the post by former Saint Paul Hunt before Vinny Faherty scored his first goal since his return to the club when he played a one-two with Kelly and smashed his shot into the top left corner.

Friendlies

| Date | Time | Opponents | Venue/Location | Result F – A | Scorers | Attendance |
|---|---|---|---|---|---|---|
| Tuesday 31 January 2012 | 7:30 PM | Glebe North | Market Green, Balbriggan, County Dublin | 2–0 | Bolger 29', Rossiter 89' | 50(est) |
| February 2012 | N/A | Phoenix | Scribblestown, Ashtown, County Dublin | 2–1 | Chambers, Rossiter | N/A |
| Thursday 9 February 2012 | 3:00 PM | Longford Town | Richmond Park, Inchicore, County Dublin | 2–0 | Browne 13', Kenna 25' | 300(est) |
| Friday 24 February 2012 | 7:45 PM | Mervue United | Richmond Park, Inchicore, County Dublin | 1–0 | O'Connor 12' | 300(est) |
| Monday 27 August 2012 | 8:00 PM | Longford Town | Leixlip United A.F.C. Grounds, Leixlip, County Kildare | 1–1 | Faherty 75' | 50(est) |

Setanta Cup

| Date | Time | Round | Opponents | Venue/Location | Result F – A | Scorers | Attendance |
|---|---|---|---|---|---|---|---|
| Monday 13 February 2012 | 7:45 PM | 1st round (1st leg) | Cliftonville | Solitude, Belfast, Northern Ireland | 1–0 | | 654 |
| Monday 20 February 2012 | 7:15 PM | 1st round (2nd leg) | Cliftonville | Richmond Park, Inchicore, County Dublin | 0–1 | | 1,079 |

== League of Ireland ==
The fixtures for the 2012 season were announced on 22 December 2011, with Pat's kicking off the new season at home to Bray Wanderers.

With a much changed team from last season, the Saints started their season with a 1–0 win against Bray Wanderers when Dean Kelly's glancing header from a Sean O'Connor corner was deemed over the line by the referee.

The Saints continued their winning start to the season with a 2–0 nil win against Dundalk F.C. with goals from Stephen O'Flynn and John Russell bagging the three points.

The Saint's next game was against newly promoted Monaghan United F.C. at home in Richmond. The game finished one 1–1 with Dean Kelly cancelling out Conor Murphy's opening goal for the Mon's but Kelly's night didn't end well, after he got a controversial red card for a high challenge on former Pat's player Stephen Maher. The Saint's could have won it late on with a penalty but Stephen O'Flynn failed to convert the spot-kick.

The next game for the Saint's was a Dublin Derby against Bohemians away, which was live on RTÉ. The game finished a bore 0–0 draw with Karl Moore and Stephen O'Flynn coming closest for both sides.

The Saint's next game was another Dublin Derby, this time it was against Shelbourne. The last time these two met it was in the FAI Cup Semi-Finals with Shels coming out on top on that occasion. Shels took the lead thanks to a Brendan McGill volley which hit the underside of the crossbar and came back down to hit the Pat's goalkeeper on the back and went into the net. But Pat's equalised before half-time with Christy Fagan scoring his first goal for the club. Even with Shels going down to ten men, the game finished 1–1 with Pat's unable to take advantage with the extra man.

Pat's played rivals Shamrock Rovers in the next game which was the Saint's third Dublin Derby in a row and the game was also live on RTÉ. Pat's started with a bang, taking an early lead through Chris Forrester with a terrific strike. The lead was doubled just before the half hour mark with John Russell slotting home from 6 yards. The lead was then made three thanks to a cheeky chip from Forrester to grab his second of the game. Ken Oman did reply for the visitors but the points where then sealed when Russell played in Christy Fagan and he rounded the keeper and rolled the ball into an empty net. Fagan then made 5–1 and put the icing on the cake when he headed the ball into again an empty net which topped off a great night in Inchicore.

An away trip to Drogheda was up next and after a frustrating 90 minutes in which their appeals for a handball in the box were waved away by the referee and many chances were wasted, Drogheda United hit the post late on.

The Saints then faced UCD at Richmond Park and although they spurned many chances in the first half Christy Fagan opened the scoring after a cleaver ball from James Chambers. The home side's dominance continued in the second half and the 3 points were secured when Greg Bolger tapped in from 5 yards in the 81st minute

RTÉ showed Pats' next game live as they traveled to league leaders Sligo Rovers. The Saints were the better side in the first half but found themselves 1-0 down after an unlucky own goal from center back Kenny Browne. Substitute Sean O'Connor scored after a great piece of skill from John Russell and the Inchicore side had the chance to win it in the 90th minute when they were awarded a penalty for Jason McGuinness' foul on Dean Kelly but top scorer Chris Fagan blazed the spotkick over the bar. To add to the disappointment of missing out on 2 valuable points from this fixture, Saints fans later received news that pivotal midfielder James Chambers' injury sustained in the game would see him out of action for 8 weeks.

The Saints traveled north to face Derry City, with the game once again on RTÉ. Mark Rossiter came off after just 7 minutes with an injury that would see him miss the remainder of the season, but his replacement Darren Meenan opened the scoring for the Dubliners with a looping header just before half time. Pats played superb football throughout and when Sean O'Connor's shot was spilled in by Derry City keeper Ger Doherty in the 64th minute, it was game over.

Pats' went into the next game against Cork City without midfielders James Chambers and Mark Rossiter through injury and Greg Bolger through suspension after receiving 4 yellow cards in the league. The Saints did well considering their makeshift midfield, with Darren Meenan Chris Forrester, Sean O'Connor all coming close but Cork City keeper Mark McNulty stopped everything that came at him. City could have won it with a penalty late on but Saints keeper Brendan Clarke saved well for a 0–0 draw that increased his sides unbeaten record in the league at Richmond Park to 22 games.

A trip to Wicklow to play Bray Wanderers was Liam Buckley's next task. Against the run of play, Jason Byrne opened the scoring, before Chris Fagan equalized just before half time. John Mulroy scored a spectacular volley after an hour to regain Wanderer's lead, but his goal was cancelled out when Fagan tapped in his second and John Russell scored a fine goal from outside the box after 72 minutes. The Saints looked to be taking the 3 points from an away game for just the third time but Byrne popped up in the 93rd minute with a volley to make it 3–3.

Pats faced a young Dundalk side at home next. All seemed to be going well for the home side after Chris Forrester headed in Ger O'Brien's corner after 43 minutes and Dundalk's Michael Rafter getting sent off in the tunnel at half-time. The Saints peppered Peter Cherrie's goal with shots but just couldn't find that 2nd goal just wouldn't come. Mark Griffn's run from the halfway line won the County Louth side a free kick on the edge of the box and Griffin curled it into the top left corner with his team's first real shot of note. As St.Pat's pushed for the winner, John Mountney caught them on the break and was fouled in exactly the same position as the Lillywhite's goal came from. Griffin fired the set-piece into the bottom right corner to become the hero to the away support. This loss ended the Saints' run of 22 unbeaten league games at Richmond Park.

Next up was a trip to Gortakeegan to face Monaghan United. Monaghan set up their stall to defend for the entire game but they found themselves 1-0 down at half time thanks to a Christy Fagan volley. As the game moved into the last 10 minutes, the Saints still hadn't managed to increase to scoring until substitute Jake Kelly scored in the 83rd and 85th minute and Greg Bolger rounded off a dominant performance with a 4th goal in the 89th minute. This game later turned out to be Monaghan's last game in the League of Ireland after they pulled out of the league during the mid-season break on 18 June.

After the mid-season break in June, Pats' next game was a Dublin derby at home to Bohemians. Bohs took the lead against the run of play after 10 minutes, from a shot that turned out to be their only effort all game. Liam Buckley brought on James Chambers, Sean O'Connor and Dean Kelly, who all had an instrumental influence on the game. Kelly fired a shot off the bar from which Christy Fagan scored the equalizer in the 82nd minute. Chambers spread the ball around well and later earned a corner that was cleared away to O'Connor, who supplied the cross for Fagan headed in the winner in the 94th minute against his former club.

A third Dublin derby at Richmond Park in 7 days followed for the Saints, as they hosted northside rivals Shelbourne in a match attended by President Michael D. Higgins, the famous 1996 league winning side, other club legends such as Keith Fahey and Brian Kerr. Pats got off to a great start after Greg Bolger's looping header opened the scoring following a great cross by Ger O'Brien. The Saints continued to dominate the game but got a late score when Philip Hughes hit the crossbar. Barry Clancy was sent off in the 84th minute after he kicked out at O'Brien, but this had little impact of the remainder of the game and the home side held out for the 1–0 win.

The Saints faced Shamrock Rovers away in their next league game after a 1–0 win vs ÍBV in their last game. The Inchicore men started off the better side, with new signing Anto Flood coming close. Craig Sives scored a header from a Billy Dennehy free-kick in the 71st minute for Rovers but in the 2nd minute of injury time, John Russell put Pat Flynn through on goal and he smashed home an equalizer against his old club to send the away end into pandemonium.

Drogheda United at home was up next for Pats at after 120 minutes of football 3 days earlier against ÍBV again, in Iceland. The home side made 6 changes from their midweek game including keeper Barry Murphy making his league debut. Murphy was at fault for the opening goal when his pass to a teammate found Drogheda's Gavin Brennan instead, who slotted in under Murphy. Midweek goalscoring hero Stephen O'Flynn was denied by the crossbar after a wonderful strike from 35 yards out before half time. First choice keeper Brendan Clarke replaced the injured Barry Murphy at half time and after many pats chances wasted, Drogheda took one of theirs after 76 minutes when Peter Hynes scored after a deflection and a goalkeeping error from Clarke. The game finished 2-0 and Drogheda overtook the Saints to 2nd place.

UCD away was the Saints next game. Pats created less chances than usual in the first half but Christopher Forrester broke the deadlock in the 45th minute after a good ball by Greg Bolger. The second half was quite the opposite, Bolger and Forrester both had chipped efforts from 35 yards tipped over the bar by Mark McGinley in the UCD goal. Robbie Benson Equalized in the 71st minute and despite a claim for a foul in the box on John Russell, they couldn't find a winner.

The Saints returned to league action away to Cork City having not played a league game in two weeks due to Europa League commitments. Pats had two great chances to open the scoring in the first half but Christy Fagan headed over from 6 yards and Christopher Forrester's effort of the open goal from 35 yards was weak and Mark McNulty made it back into the goal in time. Cork had a great chance at the start of the second half but Davin O'Neill fired wide from 8 yards. The introduction of Darren Meenan for the away side was the game changer, as he used his skill and pace to beat Danny Murphy and cross to Sean O'Connor whose flick on was volleyed in on the turn by in-form striker Christy Fagan. The Saints were under a lot of pressure in the last 10 minutes and Vinny Faherty made his return to the club from the bench and held the ball up well to grind out the result for the Dubliners.

Pats faced Bray Wanderers at home in their next game without the services of midfielder John Russell. Sean O'Connor came closest in an uneventful first half. The second half however was completely the opposite and when various Pats players felt a Wanderers player was simulating an injury, they didn't put the ball out of play. This infuriated Bray's veteran striker Jason Byrne who began to pick fights with several Pats players and was sent off for punching O'Connor in the face. Most players from both teams were involved in the incident on the halfway line and Darren Meenan was sent off for the home side in amongst the brawl. Kenny Browne was sent off after 84 minutes for a late tackle on Kieran Marty Waters. Just 3 minutes later Waters caught Brendan Clarke out at his near post to make it 1–0. Pats had late chances in the 6 minutes of injury time but Jake Kelly and Conor Kenna couldn't find the net.

Dundalk were Pats' hosts, just 3 days after the disappointing performance against Bray Wanderers. Liam Buckley decided to make 3 changes to the side that lost to Bray, including Barry Murphy in goal instead of number 1 Brendan Clarke. Pats were the better side in the first half, with Jake Carroll, Ger O'Brien, Sean O'Connor and Ryan Coombes all coming close. Dundalk's only shot on target in the first half was wonderfully saved by Murphy. Sean O'Connor struck a powerful shot with his weaker right foot past Peter Cherrie after 57 minutes, following a good ball by Chris Forrester. Murphy made one more impressive save and the Saints got their 1–0 victory after a dominant performance.

The Saints faced league leaders Sligo Rovers at home next. The game was dominated by the 2 defenses and there were few chances. Christy Fagan fired wide in an on-on-one with former Saint Gary Rogers and Ryan Coombes tested Rogers late on. Saints keeper Barry Murphy only had to make 1 save all night and it was a wonderfully saved effort from an Alan Keane header.

Pats faced an injury plagued Derry City side at Richmond Park next. Derry started the better of the two sides, hitting the crossbar and forcing Barry Murphy into a good save early on. City's Ger Doherty was also under fire in the first half, saving well from John Russell and Sean O'Connor. Indeed, it was O'Connor who broke the deadlock after 57 minutes when he fired into the top corner from 8 yards after a good ball by Christy Fagan, following a wonderful spell of passing. O'Connor was replaced by Christopher Forrester after 7 minutes and the youngster teed Jake Kelly up 6 yards from goal to tap in. Forrester also set up the third goal in injury time when he clipped a wonderful pass through the Derry centre backs to summer signing Vinny Faherty to smash over Doherty for his first goal since his return to the club.

The Saints traveled to Dalymount Park to face Dublin rivals Bohemians. Former Saint Evan McMillan opened the scoring after 25 minutes when he volleyed past former Bohs Barry Murphy. Pats equalized on 38 minutes through James Chambers' first goal of the season when he smashed in a Sean O'Connor freekick on the volley from a tight angle. Childhood Bohs fan Christopher Forrester put Pats in front after 48 minutes when he too volley in a Sean O'Connor cross. That lead lasted just 3 minutes though, as Kevin Feely headed home from a corner to make it 2–2. O'Connor topped off an amazing individual performance when he smashed a volley into the top corner from 35 yards with his bad foot. Brazilian midfielder Hernany Macedo made his debut for Pats when he replaced Jake Kelly after 68 minutes and was involved in holding on to the Saints lead.

Pats next task was to win against Shelbourne at Tolka Park for the first time in 10 years. Darren Meenan hit the bar with a 30-yard volley before Sean O'Connor had an effort cleared off the line. The Saints continued to push for a lead and they found it when O'Connor's cross found Christy Fagan who headed in off the post after 68 minutes. Former Saint Anto Murphy was sent off for punching O'Connor off the ball, minutes before he set up substitute Vinny Faherty one-on-one with ex-Pat's keeper Chris Bennion and he headed past him to earn the 3 points for the Inchicore side.

The Saints' next game was at home to out-of-form rivals Shamrock Rovers in their final Dublin derby of the season. Pats started off brilliantly and found themselves 1–0 up after 7 minutes when Sean O'Connor's shot was handled in the box by Colin Hawkins and O'Connor himself smashed the penalty down the middle past Oscar Jansson. The lead was doubled just 2 minutes later when Jake Carroll smashed his effort in via a deflection from Hawkins following a darting run into the box, for his first-ever League of Ireland goal. Christy Fagan couldn't get a shot away from 9 yards after he was played in and Ger O'Brien's crossed were causing problems for Rovers before half time. The second half produced very little chances from both teams and the away side pulled one back after 78 minutes when Gary McCabe scored from 30 yards past Barry Murphy. Pats were finally put under some pressure for the first time in the 5 minutes of injury time and Shamrock Rovers hit the post during that spell but the Saints held on for their deserved victory.

Pats' next game was away to Drogheda United, broadcast on RTÉ. The first half was a poor encounter and only a Christy Fagan volley that went just wide was the only chance of note produced by either side. The second half however was entirely different as the Saints completely dominated the play. Drogheda's Italian goalkeeper Gabriel Sava was in exceptional form to deny Chris Forrester, Christy Fagan, Sean O'Connor, James Chambers, Vinny Faherty and Greg Bolger on 3 occasions. At the other end Barry Murphy didn't have to make a single save all night as he watched his side throw 2 points away.

The Saints then faced UCD at Richmond Park, making several changes to the side. Pats broke the deadlock after 16 minutes when Chris Forrester threaded a perfect pass through the UCD defense to Jake Kelly, who rolled a well-placed effort into the bottom left corner. Just 2 minutes later, an identical move from the Saints nearly doubled the lead but this time Kelly hit the inside of the post before the ball was cleared off the line. The domination continued with UCD keeper Ger Barron tipping over a Chris Forrester lob from 35 yards, a Vinny Faherty volley and header and several other chances as the home side went in 1–0 up at half time. The lead was doubled on 58 minutes when Anto Flood pulled off a brilliant flick to Vinny Faherty, who smashed past Barron from a tight angle. The game was all but over on 66 minutes when Forrester's wonderful chipped effort hit the post, his low rebounded cross was flicked up by the studs of Anto Flood and headed in by Faherty at the back post. After getting two assists, Anto Flood got the goal his play deserved when Faherty played Chris Forrester through, he rounded the keeper and passed to Flood, who tapped into the open goal from 6 yards for his first league goal for the club. With five minutes to play Vinny Faherty completed his hat-trick when he headed substitute Stephen O'Flynn's cross onto the bar and then sneaked the rebound in to become only the third goalscorer of a hat-trick in the 2012 League of Ireland.

| Date | Time | Opponents | Venue/Location | Result F – A | Scorers | Attendance |
|---|---|---|---|---|---|---|
| Friday 2 March 2012 | 7:45 PM | Bray Wanderers | Richmond Park, Inchicore, County Dublin | 1–0 | D.Kelly 15' | 1,474 |
| Friday 9 March 2012 | 7:45 PM | Dundalk | Oriel Park, Dundalk, County Louth | 2–0 | O'Flynn 9', Russell 53' | 1,500(est) |
| Friday 16 March 2012 | 7:45 PM | Monaghan United | Richmond Park, Inchicore, County Dublin | 1–1 | D.Kelly 14' | 1,205 |
| Sunday 25 March 2012 | 4:00 PM | Bohemians | Dalymount Park, Phibsboro, County Dublin | 0–0 | | 1,423 |
| Friday 30 March 2012 | 8:00 PM | Shelbourne | Tolka Park, Drumcondra, County Dublin | 1–1 | Fagan 43' | 1,822 |
| Friday 6 April 2012 | 7:05 PM | Shamrock Rovers | Richmond Park, Inchicore, County Dublin | 5–1 | Forrester 4', 40', Russell 26', Fagan 70', 86' | 3,250 (est) |
| Friday 13 April 2012 | 7:45 PM | Drogheda United | Hunky Dorys Park, Drogheda, County Louth | 0–0 | | 1,282 |
| Friday 20 April 2012 | 7:45 PM | U.C.D | Richmond Park, Inchicore, County Dublin | 2–0 | Fagan 30', Bolger 81' | 1,228 |
| Friday 27 April 2012 | 7:05 PM | Sligo Rovers | The Showgrounds, Sligo, County Sligo | 1–1 | O'Connor 72' | 1,947 |
| Friday 4 May 2012 | 7:05 PM | Derry City | The Brandywell, Derry, Northern Ireland | 2–0 | Meenan 45', O'Connor 64' | 1,250 (est) |
| Friday 11 May 2012 | 7:45 PM | Cork City | Richmond Park, Inchicore, County Dublin | 0–0 | | 1482 |
| Friday 18 May 2012 | 7:45 PM | Bray Wanderers | Carlisle Grounds, Bray, County Wicklow | 3–3 | Fagan 44', 66', Russell 72' | 1200 (est) |
| Monday 21 May 2012 | 7:45 PM | Dundalk | Richmond Park, Inchicore, County Dublin | 1–2 | Forrester 43' | 1090 |
| Friday 1 June 2012 | 7:45 PM | Monaghan United | Gortakeegan, Monaghan, County Monaghan | 4–0 | Fagan 34', J.Kelly 83', 85', Bolger 89' | 500 (est.) |
| Friday 22 June 2012 | 7:45 PM | Bohemians | Richmond Park, Inchicore, County Dublin | 2–1 | Fagan 82', 90+4' | 1462 |
| Friday 29 June 2012 | 7:45 PM | Shelbourne | Richmond Park, Inchicore, County Dublin | 1–0 | Bolger 9' | 1579 |
| Sunday 8 July 2012 | 3:00 PM | Shamrock Rovers | Tallaght Stadium, Tallaght, County Dublin | 1–1 | Flynn 90+2' | 3500 (est.) |
| Sunday 15 July 2012 | 3:00 PM | Drogheda United | Richmond Park, Inchicore, County Dublin | 0–2 | | 1391 |
| Sunday 22 July 2012 | 3:00 PM | U.C.D | UCD Bowl, Belfield, County Dublin | 1–1 | Forrester 45' | 500 (est.) |
| Monday 13 August 2012 | 7:45 PM | Cork City | Turners Cross, Cork, County Cork | 1–0 | Fagan 68' | 2168 |
| Friday 17 August 2012 | 7:45 PM | Bray Wanderers | Richmond Park, Inchicore, County Dublin | 0–1 | | 1105 |
| Monday 20 August 2012 | 7:45 PM | Dundalk | Oriel Park, Dundalk, County Louth | 1–0 | O'Connor 57' | 1000 (est.) |
| Friday 24 August 2012 | 7:45 PM | Sligo Rovers | Richmond Park, Inchicore, County Dublin | 0–0 | | 2065 |
| Monday 3 September 2012 | 7:45 PM | Derry City | Richmond Park, Inchicore, County Dublin | 3–0 | O'Connor 57', J.Kelly 86', Faherty 90+2' | 852 |
| Friday 7 September 2012 | 7:45 PM | Bohemians | Dalymount Park, Phibsboro, County Dublin | 3-2 | Chambers 38' Forrester 48' O'Connor 70' | 1520 |
| Monday 10 September 2012 | 8:00 PM | Shelbourne | Tolka Park, Drumcondra, County Dublin | 2-0 | Fagan 70', Faherty 90+5' | 1057 |
| Tuesday 25 September 2012 | 7:45 PM | Shamrock Rovers | Richmond Park, Inchicore, County Dublin | 2-1 | O'Connor 7', Carroll 9' | 1731 |
| Friday 28 September 2012 | 7:05 PM | Drogheda United | Hunky Dorys Park, Drogheda, County Louth | 0–0 | | 1026 |
| Monday 1 October 2012 | 7:45 PM | U.C.D | Richmond Park, Inchicore, County Dublin | 5-0 | J.Kelly 16', Faherty 58', 66', 85', Flood 72' | 716 |
| Saturday 13 October 2012 | 3:45 PM | Sligo Rovers | The Showgrounds, Sligo, County Sligo | 2-3 | Fagan 53', Forrester 60' | 5621 |
| Friday 19 October 2012 | 7:45 PM | Derry City | The Brandywell, Derry, Northern Ireland | 1-2 | Forrester 57' | 1800 (est.) |
| Friday 26 October 2012 | 7:45 PM | Cork City | Richmond Park, Inchicore, County Dublin | 1-0 | Fagan 56' | 1206 |

- Note the 2 games against Monaghan United, 1–1 at home on 16 March and 4–0 away on 1 June were expunged by the FAI along with the rest of Monaghan's results because they pulled out of the league on 18 June after 14 games were played.

=== League Results summary ===
| Overall | | | | | | | | Home | | | | | | Away | | | | | |
| Pld | W | D | L | GF | GA | GD | Pts | W | D | L | GF | GA | GD | W | D | L | GF | GA | GD |
|---|---|---|---|---|---|---|---|---|---|---|---|---|---|---|---|---|---|---|---|
| 30 | 15 | 10 | 5 | 44 | 22 | +22 | 55 | 9 | 2 | 3 | 23 | 8 | +15 | 6 | 8 | 2 | 21 | 14 | +7 |

Last updated: 26 October 2012.
Source: League of Ireland Premier Division Fixtures

=== Table ===
| Pos | Team | Pld | W | D | L | GF | GA | GD | Pts | Qualification or relegation |
|---|---|---|---|---|---|---|---|---|---|---|
| 1 | Sligo Rovers (C) | 30 | 17 | 10 | 3 | 53 | 23 | +30 | 61 | Qualification for Champions League second qualifying round |
| 2 | Drogheda United | 30 | 17 | 6 | 7 | 51 | 36 | +15 | 57 | Qualification for Europa League first qualifying round |
| 3 | St Patrick's Athletic | 30 | 15 | 10 | 5 | 44 | 22 | +22 | 55 | Qualification for Europa League first qualifying round |
| 4 | Shamrock Rovers | 30 | 14 | 10 | 6 | 56 | 37 | +19 | 52 | |
| 5 | Derry City | 30 | 11 | 6 | 13 | 36 | 36 | 0 | 39 | Qualification for Europa League second qualifying round (Note: Derry City qualified for the UEFA Europa League second qualifying round after winning the 2012 FAI Cup Final.) |

(C) Champions

== UEFA Europa League ==
St. Patrick's Athletic were drawn to play Íþróttabandalag Vestmannaeyja from Iceland in the 2012–13 UEFA Europa League First qualifying round, with the first leg played in Dublin and the second played in Vestmannaeyjar. Pats faced the same side at the same stage of the competition in their 2011 European campaign, losing 1–0 in Reykjavík and winning 2–0 in Dublin. Should the Saints progress, they would face NK Široki Brijeg from Bosnia and Herzegovina. The previous campaign, the away leg was played in the Vodafonehöllin stadium in Reykjavík due to ÍBV's ground the Hásteinsvöllur's capacity being too small, but for this tie, it was announced that the game would be played in Vestmannaeyjar island, following ground improvements to the Hásteinsvöllur.

The first leg was played in front of a sell out crowd and the Saints nearly found themselves behind when Christian Olsen hit the crossbar for ÍBV early on, but the home side took the lead after 39 minutes when Ger O'Brien put in a wonderful cross for Christy Fagan to volley home. Very few chances were created in the remainder of the game and the Saints held out for a sloppy 1–0 win.

Pats travelled to the Hásteinsvöllur on the tiny island of Vestmannaeyjar for the second leg. The away side were defending very well throughput the game with Brendan Clarke making some great saves. This was the case until Mat Garner made it 1–0 in the 83rd minute to take the game into extra-time, a first for the Saints in Europe. Things went from bad to worse when Eythor Birgisson scored in the 98th minute, putting ÍBV in a position to win the tie. Worries for the Saints were soon gone when substitute Stephen O'Flynn controlled Conor Kenna's long ball with his chest, and stabbed the ball past Abel Dihara a minute later. The Saints held out for the remainder of the game and earned a second round tie with NK Široki Brijeg following a 2–2 draw on aggregate, with a 1–0 win on away goals.

The first leg of the second round was played at the Stadion Pecara, Bosnia and Herzegovina in intense 30 degree heat. Pats started off excellently, when Sean O'Connor's cross was handled in the area. John Russell's penalty was saved by Luka Bilobrk but just a minute later his shot was again saved by Bilobrk, but it fell into the path of in-form striker Christy Fagan who slotted it in. Široki Brijeg were reduced to 10 men in the 43rd minute when Mladen Jurčević received his second yellow for a foul on Fagan. The Saints continued their dominance in the second half with Christopher Forrester hitting the post and Darren Meenan coming close, but Brazilian Santos Wagner scored a header in the 93rd minute with the last touch of the game.

The next day, the draw for the third qualifying round was made and the winners of the Široki Brijeg tie would play German side Hannover 96.

The Saints started off excellently in the second leg, when John Russell opened the scoring after 39 minutes following two other good chances missed by the home side. Brendan Clarke had little to do on the night other than collect Široki Brijeg crosses and tame shots but the Bosnians equalized in the 65th minute through an Ivica Džidić header from a corner. The game finished 1-1 after 90 minutes, matching the scoreline of the first leg meaning the game would head into extra-time once again. Extra-time itself was also a tight encounter but Christy Fagan volleyed in a Conor Kenna flick on in the 105th minute. The Inchicore side held out until the 118th minute when Široki striker Mateo Roskam was one-on-one with Clarke, but Ger O'Brien put in a world class tackle to send his side through to the third round to play Hannover 96 of Germany.

With the Saints European fortress Richmond Park unsuitable to host a third round clash, the game was played in South Dublin County Council's Tallaght Stadium. The game was broadcast by a German sports channel and had 1.1 million viewers. Hannover 96 started off as the better side and they opened the scoring through Leon Andreasen's wonderful finish into the top corner from 25 yards. Apart from that effort, Brendan Clarke didn't have to make any saves in the first half, with Sean O'Connor narrowly missing the top corner and Ian Bermingham having a handball claim turned down by the Hungarian referee. Pats started the second half brilliantly with wonderful football on show and Christy Fagan and James Chambers spurning chances that they should really have scored. Christian Pander scored a free-kick from 35 yards in the 66th minute against the run of play after an unkind bounce deceived Clarke. Christy Fagan then missed a one-on-one with German international keeper Ron-Robert Zieler, before Ivorian international Didier Ya Konan scored a third away goal for Hannover to end the tie. Although the game finished 3–0 to the away side, Pats supporters were happy with the team's performance against a superior side from a far superior league and take great pride in the 20 minute spell after half time when they outplayed a Bundesliga side and should have scored.

Pats went into the second leg knowing it would be a daunting test to knock Hannover 96 out after the first leg scoreline. They did however start the better of the two sides, with centre back Conor Kenna smashing the crossbar, having beaten Ron-Robert Zieler in goal. The Saints limited Hannover to very little chances in the first half but conceded a very soft goal, giving Karim Haggui a free header which he scored, from six yards after a harsh free kick decision. Early in the second half, defender Mario Eggimann scored a similar goal after a short free kick, he headed in off the crossbar from 6 yards. The second half wasn't much of a spectacle for the 24,500 fans at the AWD-Arena but the loyal group of 300 Saints chanted non-stop for the entirety as they watched their side exit the Europa League with pride.

| Date | Time | Round | Country | Opponents | Venue/Location | Result F – A | Scorers | Attendance |
|---|---|---|---|---|---|---|---|---|
| Thursday 5 July 2012 | 7:45 PM | 1st round (1st leg) | (Iceland) | ÍBV | Richmond Park, Inchicore, County Dublin | 1-0 | Fagan 39' | 1652 |
| Thursday 12 July 2012 | 7:30 PM (Local Time) | 1st round (2nd leg) | (Iceland) | ÍBV | Hásteinsvöllur, Vestmannaeyjar, Iceland | 1-2 AET | O'Flynn 99' | 866 |
| Thursday 19 July 2012 | 10:00 PM (Local Time) | 2nd round (1st leg) | (Bosnia and Herzegovina) | NK Široki Brijeg | Stadion Pecara, Široki Brijeg, Bosnia and Herzegovina | 1-1 | Fagan 12' | 3200 (est.) |
| Thursday 26 July 2012 | 7:45 PM | 2nd round (2nd leg) | (Bosnia and Herzegovina) | NK Široki Brijeg | Richmond Park, Inchicore, County Dublin | 2-1 AET | Russell 39', Fagan 105' | 1805 |
| Thursday 2 August 2012 | 7:45 PM | 3rd round (1st leg) | (Germany) | Hannover 96 | Tallaght Stadium, Tallaght, County Dublin | 0-3 | | 4236 |
| Thursday 9 August 2012 | 7:30 PM (Local Time) | 3rd round (2nd leg) | (Germany) | Hannover 96 | AWD-Arena, Hannover, Germany | 0-2 | | 24,500 |

Statistics accurate as of match on 9 August 2012.
Source:2012 St Patrick's Athletic F.C. season

== FAI Cup ==
The draw for the second round of the FAI Cup was made on RTÉ's Monday Night Soccer programme on 30 April. Pats were drawn away to Crumlin United who they knocked out of the competition in 2011 after a 3–0 win. With Crumlin's ground deemed unsuitable for the tie, the club's came to an agreement to play the game at St.Pats' home ground of Richmond Park Pats went 1–0 up early on after Darren Meenan's cross was poorly cleared on the volley by Crumlin United's Derek Griffin and it looped over Dave Meehan in goal. The lead was doubled after 12 minutes when FAI Ford Man of The Match Jake Carroll beat a defender and slotted his shot into the corner. Substitute Jake Kelly made it 3–0 with 3 minutes to go when he drove his shot into the bottom corner.

The draw for the third round was made on 16 July on MNS. Following Monaghan United's (who knocked Sligo Rovers out in the 2nd round) withdrawal from the League of Ireland, the first side out in the draw would receive a bye into the quarter-finals. Luckily, the Saints were drawn out first and received the bye in to the last eight of the competition.

The draw for the quarter-finals resulted in the Saints drawing County Louth club Drogheda United at home.

The Saints were boosted by the return of John Russell from injury, but were without top scorer Christy Fagan through injury. Sean O'Connor came close to opening the scoring and Vinny Faherty missed 2 good chances in the first half. Many more chances went a begging for the home side in the second half including a disallowed Christopher Forrester strike, but the chance of the game fell to Greg Bolger who was through on goal with only Gabriel Sava to beat, but he fired straight at the Italian goalkeeper who received the FAI Ford Man of the Match award.

After a scoreless draw with Drogheda United in Inchicore, Pats travelled to Hunky Dorys Park for the replay. The game was very similar to the first tie between the sides, with Pats throwing wave after wave of attack at a very defensive United side. Pats nearly took the lead early on when Sean O'Connor's curled effort went just wide. Pats also came close from three corners. The away side had less efforts in the second half and disastrously found themselves 1-0 down when Derek Prendergast headed in Gavin Brennan's corner against the run of play. Pats missed two more good chances before Vinny Faherty converted Aidan Price's flick on with his face in the 94th minute to send the game into extra-time. Extra-time itself was dominated by both teams' tiredness and no real clear-cut chances were created so the game went to a penalty shootout. Sean O'Connor, Jake Kelly and Vinny Faherty scored for the Saints with Ian Bermingham missing his spotkick. However the hero of the night was Barry Murphy who saved 3 Drogheda penalties, the last against Gavin Brennan, to send the away end into raptures as their side remained in the hunt to end their cup drought dating back to 1961.

The draw for the semi-finals was made on MNS during Pats' Quarter-final replay with Drogheda United. It resulted in the winner of the quarter-final Replay to play Dundalk away at Oriel Park.

Pats fans traveled in big numbers up to Dundalk for the semi-final live on RTÉ. The Saints started off the better of the two sides and found themselves ahead when Kenny Browne scored his first competitive goal of the season when he volley in Chris Forrester's header from a Ger O'Brien corner. Sean O'Connor nearly doubled the lead from a free-kick but it was tipped over the bar by Peter Cherrie. Greg Bolger was the man to double the lead though when he headed in an O'Connor cross after 52 minutes. Sean O'Connor finally got the goal his performance deserved after 85 minutes when Cherrie was pressured by Christy Fagan into heading the ball right to O'Connor, who passed into an empty net from 25 yards to put the Saints into the final at the Aviva Stadium.

| Date | Time | Round | Opponents | Venue/Location | Result F – A | Scorers | Attendance |
|---|---|---|---|---|---|---|---|
| Sunday 27 May 2012 | 3:00 PM | 2nd round | Crumlin United | Richmond Park, Inchicore, County Dublin (Away Game) | 3-0 | Griffin (OG) 3', Carroll 12', J.Kelly 87' | 600 (est.) |
| N/A | N/A | 3rd round | (Bye) | N/A | N/A | N/A | N/A |
| Friday 14 September 2012 | 7:45 PM | Quarter-final | Drogheda United | Richmond Park, Inchicore, County Dublin | 0-0 | | 1346 |
| Monday 17 September 2012 | 7:45 PM | Quarter-final (Replay) | Drogheda United | Hunky Dorys Park, Drogheda, County Louth | 1-1 AET (3-2 Pens.) | Faherty 90'+3 | 1115 |
| Sunday 7 October 2012 | 3:55 PM | Semi-final | Dundalk | Oriel Park, Dundalk, County Louth | 3-0 | Browne 20', Bolger 52', O'Connor 85' | 2035 |
| Sunday 4 November 2012 | 3:30 PM | Final | Derry City | Aviva Stadium, Ballsbridge, County Dublin | 2-3 AET | Sean O'Connor 53', Christy Fagan 87' | 16117 |

== EA Sports Cup ==
Pat's received a bye into the Second Round of EA Sports Cup. The draw took place on 27 March 2012 with Pat's getting a home draw to U.C.D. The match took place on Monday 9 April where the Saint's won 2–1. The Saint's took the lead just before half time thanks to a goal from Sean O'Connor who slotted the ball by keeper to give his side a half time lead. The lead was made two in the 56th minute when Ian Daly finished from six yards out. The Students did pull one back before the end thanks to a Chris Lyons strike but the Saint's held on to progress to the next round.

The Saints were drawn at home to Shamrock Rovers in the quarter-finals, on the same day that their Dublin rivals knocked them out of the Leinster Senior Cup at the quarter-final stage. Pats started the game the better side, but Rovers took the lead after 6 minutes from a Killian Brennan free-kick. Sean O'Connor converted Pat Flynn's cross in the 27th minute to draw level. The deadlock could not be broken in 90 minutes or Extra time, so the game went to penalties for a place in the semi-finals. O'Connor and John Russell scored their penalties for the home side but James Chambers and Ian Daly missed their spotkicks and despite Barry Murphy saving one penalty, his side last 4–2 in the shootout.

| Date | Time | Round | Opponents | Venue/Location | Result F – A | Scorers | Attendance |
|---|---|---|---|---|---|---|---|
| Monday 9 April 2012 | 3:00 PM | 2nd round | U.C.D | Richmond Park, Inchicore, County Dublin | 2-1 | O'Connor 44', Daly 56' | 500 (est) |
| Tuesday 26 June 2012 | 7:45 PM | Quarter-final | Shamrock Rovers | Richmond Park, Inchicore, County Dublin | 1-1 AET (2-4 Pens.) | O'Connor 27' | 1091 |

== Leinster Senior Cup ==
Pat's started their defence of their Leinster Senior Cup with a home tie against Phoenix F.C. The Saints ran out comfortable winners on the night with a 4–0, through goals from Christy Fagan, Ian Daly and a brace from Christopher Forrester.

The champions were drawn to play Dublin rivals Shamrock Rovers in the quarter-finals, at Tallaght Stadium. The Saints played seven players from the Under 19 team, with the remaining players made up of those who hadn't been in the starting team in the last league game away to Derry City. Pats found themselves 1-0 down just before half time after Sean Gannon scored for the home side and the game was over when Dean Ebbe and Aaron Greene fired past St.Pats' 17-year-old keeper Lee Brandon.

| Date | Time | Round | Opponents | Venue/Location | Result F – A | Scorers | Attendance |
|---|---|---|---|---|---|---|---|
| Monday 12 March 2012 | 7:45 PM | 4th round | Phoenix | Richmond Park, Inchicore, County Dublin | 4–0 | Fagan 3', Forrester 43', 78', Daly 70' | 300(est) |
| Sunday 7 May 2012 | 3:00 PM | Quarter-final | Shamrock Rovers | Tallaght Stadium, Tallaght, County Dublin | 0-3 | | 750 (est) |

== Season Statistics ==
- Including the 2 Airtricity League games against Monaghan United (1-1 at home & 4–0 away)

| Competition | Total Games | Home Games | Away Games | Total Goals For | Home Goals For | Away Goals For | Total Goals Against | Home Goals Against | Away Goals Against |
|---|---|---|---|---|---|---|---|---|---|
| Airtricity League | 32 | 15 | 17 | 49 | 24 | 25 | 23 | 8 | 14 |
| FAI Cup | 4 | 1 | 3 | 7 | 0 | 7 | 1 | 0 | 1 |
| UEFA Europa League | 6 | 3 | 3 | 5 | 3 | 2 | 9 | 4 | 5 |
| EA Sports Cup | 2 | 2 | 0 | 3 | 3 | 0 | 2 | 2 | 0 |
| Setanta Cup | 2 | 1 | 1 | 0 | 0 | 0 | 2 | 1 | 1 |
| Leinster Senior Cup | 2 | 1 | 1 | 4 | 4 | 0 | 3 | 0 | 3 |
| Friendlies | 5 | 2 | 3 | 8 | 3 | 5 | 2 | 0 | 2 |
| Total | 53 | 25 | 28 | 76 | 38 | 38 | 40 | 15 | 26 |

Statistics accurate as of match on 26 October 2012.
Source:2012 St Patrick's Athletic F.C. season

Squad Statistics

- Including the 2 Airtricity League games against Monaghan United (1-1 at home & 4–0 away).
- Not including friendlies

All competitions
| Player | Number | Goals | Assists | Appearances | Minutes | Starts | Substitutes On | Substitutes Off | Unused Substitutes | Yellow Cards | Red Cards |
|---|---|---|---|---|---|---|---|---|---|---|---|
| (Republic of Ireland) Brendan Clarke | 1 | 0 | 0 | 31 | 2835 | 30 | 1 | 0 | 19 | 0 | 0 |
| (Republic of Ireland) Ger O'Brien | 2 | 0 | 3 | 45 | 4025 | 44 | 1 | 2 | 0 | 3 | 0 |
| (Republic of Ireland) Jake Carroll | 3 | 2 | 1 | 30 | 2271 | 24 | 6 | 4 | 14 | 7 | 0 |
| (Republic of Ireland) Conor Kenna | 4 | 0 | 3 | 40 | 3555 | 39 | 1 | 2 | 2 | 6 | 0 |
| (Republic of Ireland) Aidan Price | 5 | 0 | 1 | 5 | 395 | 4 | 1 | 1 | 27 | 1 | 0 |
| (Republic of Ireland) Greg Bolger | 6 | 6 | 3 | 40 | 3295 | 33 | 6 | 3 | 3 | 10 | 0 |
| (Northern Ireland) Darren Meenan | 7 | 1 | 2 | 27 | 1329 | 13 | 14 | 6 | 8 | 3 | 1 |
| (Republic of Ireland) James Chambers | 8 | 1 | 2 | 37 | 3154 | 34 | 2 | 9 | 1 | 5 | 0 |
| (Republic of Ireland) Christy Fagan | 9 | 18 | 4 | 34 | 2677 | 32 | 2 | 19 | 1 | 2 | 0 |
| (Republic of Ireland) Ian Daly | 10 | 1 | 2 | 13 | 527 | 4 | 9 | 1 | 9 | 0 | 0 |
| (Republic of Ireland) Sean O'Connor | 11 | 9 | 10 | 38 | 2915 | 30 | 8 | 16 | 2 | 6 | 1 |
| (Republic of Ireland) Ian Bermingham | 12 | 0 | 2 | 40 | 3735 | 40 | 0 | 0 | 2 | 1 | 0 |
| (Republic of Ireland) Pat Flynn | 13 | 1 | 2 | 13 | 1185 | 13 | 0 | 1 | 27 | 4 | 0 |
| (Republic of Ireland) Mark Rossiter | 14 | 0 | 0 | 6 | 370 | 4 | 2 | 1 | 5 | 0 | 0 |
| (Republic of Ireland) Kenny Browne | 15 | 1 | 0 | 40 | 3564 | 36 | 4 | 0 | 0 | 7 | 1 |
| (Republic of Ireland) Barry Murphy | 16 | 0 | 0 | 17 | 1545 | 17 | 0 | 1 | 25 | 0 | 0 |
| (Republic of Ireland) Chris Forrester | 17 | 6 | 10 | 36 | 2747 | 32 | 4 | 18 | 2 | 6 | 0 |
| (Republic of Ireland) John Russell | 18 | 4 | 5 | 29 | 2549 | 27 | 2 | 3 | 0 | 7 | 1 |
| (Republic of Ireland) Jake Kelly | 19 | 5 | 1 | 33 | 1532 | 19 | 14 | 13 | 7 | 1 | 1 |
| (Republic of Ireland) Stephen O'Flynn | 20 | 2 | 1 | 11 | 381 | 4 | 7 | 4 | 2 | 0 | 0 |
| (Republic of Ireland) Dean Kelly | 21 | 2 | 4 | 17 | 794 | 7 | 10 | 3 | 2 | 1 | 1 |
| (Republic of Ireland) Ryan Coombes | 22 | 0 | 0 | 8 | 452 | 4 | 4 | 3 | 14 | 1 | 0 |
| (Republic of Ireland) Kevin Farragher | 23 | 0 | 1 | 2 | 180 | 2 | 0 | 0 | 2 | 0 | 0 |
| (Republic of Ireland) Eoin Hyland | 24 | 0 | 0 | 2 | 180 | 2 | 0 | 0 | 6 | 0 | 0 |
| (Republic of Ireland) Anto Flood | 25 | 1 | 0 | 12 | 410 | 4 | 8 | 2 | 5 | 2 | 0 |
| (Republic of Ireland) Vinny Faherty | 26 | 6 | 0 | 12 | 469 | 4 | 8 | 1 | 2 | 0 | 0 |
| (Brazil) Hernany Macedo | 30 | 0 | 0 | 2 | 67 | 1 | 1 | 1 | 0 | 1 | 0 |
| (Republic of Ireland) Conor Pepper | N/A | 0 | 0 | 1 | 90 | 1 | 0 | 0 | 0 | 0 | 0 |
| (Republic of Ireland) Lee Brandon | N/A | 0 | 0 | 1 | 90 | 1 | 0 | 0 | 2 | 0 | 0 |
| (Republic of Ireland) Kevin Dempsey | N/A | 0 | 0 | 1 | 63 | 1 | 0 | 1 | 1 | 0 | 0 |
| (Republic of Ireland) Adam O'Connor | N/A | 0 | 0 | 1 | 27 | 0 | 1 | 0 | 1 | 0 | 0 |
| (Republic of Ireland) Gavin Boyne | N/A | 0 | 0 | 1 | 10 | 0 | 1 | 0 | 0 | 0 | 0 |
| (Republic of Ireland) Jamie McGlynn | N/A | 0 | 0 | 0 | 0 | 0 | 0 | 0 | 2 | 0 | 0 |
| (Republic of Ireland) Rob Cornwall | N/A | 0 | 0 | 0 | 0 | 0 | 0 | 0 | 2 | 0 | 0 |
| (Republic of Ireland) Alex Prizeman | N/A | 0 | 0 | 0 | 0 | 0 | 0 | 0 | 1 | 0 | 0 |
| (Nigeria) Ismahil Akinade | N/A | 0 | 0 | 0 | 0 | 0 | 0 | 0 | 1 | 0 | 0 |
| (Romania) Mario Chindea | N/A | 0 | 0 | 0 | 0 | 0 | 0 | 0 | 1 | 0 | 0 |
| (Republic of Ireland) Aaron Behan | N/A | 0 | 0 | 0 | 0 | 0 | 0 | 0 | 1 | 0 | 0 |
| (Republic of Ireland) Niall Conran | N/A | 0 | 0 | 0 | 0 | 0 | 0 | 0 | 1 | 0 | 0 |
| (Republic of Ireland) Sean Hoare | N/A | 0 | 0 | 0 | 0 | 0 | 0 | 0 | 1 | 0 | 0 |

Airtricity League
| Player | Number | Goals | Assists | Appearances | Minutes | Starts | Substitutes On | Substitutes Off | Unused Substitutes | Yellow Cards | Red Cards |
|---|---|---|---|---|---|---|---|---|---|---|---|
| (Republic of Ireland) Brendan Clarke | 1 | 0 | 0 | 22 | 1935 | 21 | 1 | 0 | 11 | 0 | 0 |
| (Republic of Ireland) Ger O'Brien | 2 | 0 | 2 | 30 | 2700 | 30 | 0 | 0 | 0 | 3 | 0 |
| (Republic of Ireland) Jake Carroll | 3 | 1 | 0 | 19 | 1498 | 17 | 2 | 2 | 13 | 3 | 0 |
| (Republic of Ireland) Conor Kenna | 4 | 0 | 1 | 29 | 2566 | 29 | 0 | 1 | 1 | 4 | 0 |
| (Republic of Ireland) Aidan Price | 5 | 0 | 0 | 2 | 180 | 2 | 0 | 0 | 20 | 0 | 0 |
| (Republic of Ireland) Greg Bolger | 6 | 3 | 4 | 28 | 2210 | 24 | 4 | 1 | 4 | 7 | 0 |
| (Northern Ireland) Darren Meenan | 7 | 1 | 0 | 18 | 796 | 7 | 11 | 4 | 16 | 0 | 1 |
| (Republic of Ireland) James Chambers | 8 | 1 | 2 | 26 | 2162 | 25 | 1 | 7 | 0 | 3 | 0 |
| (Republic of Ireland) Christy Fagan | 9 | 13 | 2 | 25 | 1976 | 23 | 2 | 15 | 0 | 1 | 0 |
| (Republic of Ireland) Ian Daly | 10 | 0 | 0 | 8 | 127 | 0 | 8 | 0 | 7 | 0 | 0 |
| (Republic of Ireland) Sean O'Connor | 11 | 6 | 9 | 25 | 1657 | 19 | 6 | 11 | 2 | 3 | 1 |
| (Republic of Ireland) Ian Bermingham | 12 | 0 | 1 | 28 | 2454 | 28 | 0 | 1 | 2 | 2 | 0 |
| (Republic of Ireland) Pat Flynn | 13 | 1 | 0 | 8 | 675 | 8 | 0 | 1 | 21 | 3 | 0 |
| (Republic of Ireland) Mark Rossiter | 14 | 0 | 0 | 3 | 99 | 2 | 1 | 1 | 5 | 0 | 0 |
| (Republic of Ireland) Kenny Browne | 15 | 0 | 0 | 30 | 2603 | 28 | 2 | 0 | 1 | 4 | 1 |
| (Republic of Ireland) Barry Murphy | 16 | 0 | 0 | 11 | 945 | 11 | 0 | 1 | 1 | 0 | 0 |
| (Republic of Ireland) Chris Forrester | 17 | 7 | 9 | 26 | 1951 | 23 | 3 | 10 | 2 | 3 | 0 |
| (Republic of Ireland) John Russell | 18 | 3 | 4 | 21 | 1703 | 19 | 2 | 2 | 0 | 3 | 0 |
| (Republic of Ireland) Jake Kelly | 19 | 4 | 1 | 26 | 1246 | 15 | 11 | 11 | 3 | 1 | 1 |
| (Republic of Ireland) Stephen O'Flynn | 20 | 1 | 1 | 6 | 337 | 4 | 2 | 3 | 1 | 0 | 0 |
| (Republic of Ireland) Dean Kelly | 21 | 2 | 4 | 13 | 547 | 5 | 8 | 3 | 1 | 1 | 1 |
| (Republic of Ireland) Ryan Coombes | 22 | 0 | 0 | 8 | 365 | 3 | 5 | 3 | 12 | 2 | 0 |
| (Republic of Ireland) Kevin Farragher | 23 | 0 | 0 | 0 | 0 | 0 | 0 | 0 | 2 | 0 | 0 |
| (Republic of Ireland) Eoin Hyland | 24 | 0 | 0 | 0 | 0 | 0 | 0 | 0 | 7 | 0 | 0 |
| (Republic of Ireland) Anto Flood | 25 | 1 | 0 | 8 | 341 | 3 | 5 | 2 | 4 | 3 | 0 |
| (Republic of Ireland) Vinny Faherty | 26 | 5 | 1 | 11 | 442 | 4 | 7 | 1 | 2 | 0 | 0 |
| (Brazil) Hernany Macedo | 30 | 0 | 0 | 2 | 67 | 1 | 1 | 1 | 0 | 1 | 0 |
| (Republic of Ireland) Gavin Boyne | N/A | 0 | 0 | 1 | 10 | 0 | 1 | 0 | 0 | 0 | 0 |
| (Republic of Ireland) Lee Brandon | N/A | 0 | 0 | 0 | 0 | 0 | 0 | 0 | 2 | 0 | 0 |
| (Republic of Ireland) Sean Hoare | N/A | 0 | 0 | 0 | 0 | 0 | 0 | 0 | 1 | 0 | 0 |
| (Republic of Ireland) Nathan Murphy | N/A | 0 | 0 | 1 | 10 | 0 | 1 | 0 | 0 | 0 | 0 |

UEFA Europa League
| Player | Number | Goals | Assists | Appearances | Minutes | Starts | Substitutes On | Substitutes Off | Unused Substitutes | Yellow Cards | Red Cards |
|---|---|---|---|---|---|---|---|---|---|---|---|
| (Republic of Ireland) Brendan Clarke | 1 | 0 | 0 | 6 | 600 | 6 | 0 | 0 | 0 | 0 | 0 |
| (Republic of Ireland) Ger O'Brien | 2 | 0 | 1 | 6 | 600 | 6 | 0 | 0 | 0 | 0 | 0 |
| (Republic of Ireland) Jake Carroll | 3 | 0 | 0 | 3 | 68 | 0 | 3 | 0 | 3 | 0 | 0 |
| (Republic of Ireland) Conor Kenna | 4 | 0 | 2 | 6 | 600 | 6 | 0 | 0 | 0 | 2 | 0 |
| (Republic of Ireland) Aidan Price | 5 | 0 | 0 | 0 | 0 | 0 | 0 | 0 | 6 | 0 | 0 |
| (Republic of Ireland) Greg Bolger | 6 | 0 | 0 | 6 | 593 | 6 | 0 | 1 | 0 | 1 | 0 |
| (Northern Ireland) Darren Meenan | 7 | 0 | 0 | 6 | 237 | 2 | 4 | 1 | 0 | 0 | 0 |
| (Republic of Ireland) James Chambers | 8 | 0 | 0 | 6 | 600 | 6 | 0 | 0 | 0 | 1 | 0 |
| (Republic of Ireland) Christy Fagan | 9 | 3 | 1 | 5 | 418 | 5 | 0 | 3 | 0 | 1 | 0 |
| (Republic of Ireland) Sean O'Connor | 11 | 0 | 0 | 6 | 539 | 6 | 0 | 4 | 0 | 1 | 0 |
| (Republic of Ireland) Ian Bermingham | 12 | 0 | 0 | 6 | 600 | 6 | 0 | 0 | 0 | 0 | 0 |
| (Republic of Ireland) Pat Flynn | 13 | 0 | 0 | 0 | 0 | 0 | 0 | 0 | 5 | 0 | 0 |
| (Republic of Ireland) Kenny Browne | 15 | 0 | 0 | 6 | 600 | 6 | 0 | 0 | 0 | 0 | 0 |
| (Republic of Ireland) Barry Murphy | 16 | 0 | 0 | 0 | 0 | 0 | 0 | 0 | 6 | 0 | 0 |
| (Republic of Ireland) Chris Forrester | 17 | 0 | 0 | 5 | 410 | 5 | 0 | 5 | 0 | 1 | 0 |
| (Republic of Ireland) John Russell | 18 | 1 | 1 | 5 | 454 | 5 | 0 | 1 | 0 | 2 | 0 |
| (Republic of Ireland) Jake Kelly | 19 | 0 | 0 | 3 | 58 | 0 | 3 | 0 | 3 | 0 | 0 |
| (Republic of Ireland) Stephen O'Flynn | 20 | 1 | 0 | 1 | 59 | 0 | 1 | 0 | 1 | 0 | 0 |
| (Republic of Ireland) Dean Kelly | 21 | 0 | 0 | 1 | 42 | 0 | 1 | 0 | 0 | 0 | 0 |
| (Republic of Ireland) Anto Flood | 25 | 0 | 0 | 5 | 100 | 1 | 4 | 1 | 1 | 1 | 0 |

FAI Ford Cup
| Player | Number | Goals | Assists | Appearances | Minutes | Starts | Substitutes On | Substitutes Off | Unused Substitutes | Yellow Cards | Red Cards |
|---|---|---|---|---|---|---|---|---|---|---|---|
| (Republic of Ireland) Brendan Clarke | 1 | 0 | 0 | 2 | 210 | 2 | 0 | 0 | 3 | 0 | 0 |
| (Republic of Ireland) Ger O'Brien | 2 | 0 | 0 | 5 | 449 | 5 | 0 | 2 | 0 | 0 | 0 |
| (Republic of Ireland) Jake Carroll | 3 | 1 | 0 | 5 | 399 | 5 | 0 | 2 | 0 | 2 | 0 |
| (Republic of Ireland) Conor Kenna | 4 | 0 | 0 | 5 | 510 | 5 | 0 | 0 | 0 | 0 | 0 |
| (Republic of Ireland) Aidan Price | 5 | 0 | 1 | 1 | 47 | 0 | 1 | 0 | 4 | 0 | 0 |
| (Republic of Ireland) Greg Bolger | 6 | 1 | 0 | 4 | 244 | 2 | 2 | 1 | 0 | 2 | 0 |
| (Northern Ireland) Darren Meenan | 7 | 0 | 2 | 1 | 66 | 1 | 0 | 1 | 2 | 1 | 0 |
| (Republic of Ireland) James Chambers | 8 | 0 | 0 | 4 | 370 | 4 | 0 | 1 | 1 | 2 | 0 |
| (Republic of Ireland) Christy Fagan | 9 | 1 | 1 | 3 | 269 | 3 | 0 | 1 | 0 | 0 | 0 |
| (Republic of Ireland) Ian Daly | 10 | 0 | 0 | 0 | 0 | 0 | 0 | 0 | 1 | 0 | 0 |
| (Republic of Ireland) Sean O'Connor | 11 | 2 | 2 | 5 | 445 | 4 | 1 | 0 | 0 | 2 | 0 |
| (Republic of Ireland) Ian Bermingham | 12 | 0 | 1 | 5 | 510 | 5 | 0 | 0 | 0 | 0 | 0 |
| (Republic of Ireland) Pat Flynn | 13 | 0 | 0 | 2 | 135 | 1 | 1 | 0 | 3 | 1 | 0 |
| (Republic of Ireland) Kenny Browne | 15 | 1 | 0 | 4 | 390 | 4 | 0 | 0 | 0 | 1 | 0 |
| (Republic of Ireland) Barry Murphy | 16 | 0 | 0 | 3 | 300 | 3 | 0 | 0 | 1 | 0 | 0 |
| (Republic of Ireland) Chris Forrester | 17 | 0 | 2 | 5 | 433 | 5 | 0 | 3 | 0 | 1 | 0 |
| (Republic of Ireland) John Russell | 18 | 0 | 0 | 4 | 276 | 3 | 2 | 1 | 0 | 1 | 0 |
| (Republic of Ireland) Jake Kelly | 19 | 1 | 0 | 5 | 200 | 2 | 3 | 1 | 0 | 0 | 0 |
| (Republic of Ireland) Stephen O'Flynn | 20 | 0 | 0 | 2 | 49 | 0 | 2 | 0 | 0 | 0 | 0 |
| (Republic of Ireland) Dean Kelly | 21 | 0 | 0 | 1 | 31 | 0 | 1 | 0 | 1 | 0 | 0 |
| (Republic of Ireland) Ryan Coombes | 22 | 0 | 0 | 0 | 0 | 0 | 0 | 0 | 2 | 0 | 0 |
| (Republic of Ireland) Vinny Faherty | 26 | 1 | 0 | 4 | 279 | 2 | 1 | 1 | 0 | 0 | 0 |

EA Sports Cup
| Player | Number | Goals | Assists | Appearances | Minutes | Starts | Substitutes On | Substitutes Off | Unused Substitutes | Yellow Cards | Red Cards |
|---|---|---|---|---|---|---|---|---|---|---|---|
| (Republic of Ireland) Brendan Clarke | 1 | 0 | 0 | 0 | 0 | 0 | 0 | 0 | 2 | 0 | 0 |
| (Republic of Ireland) Ger O'Brien | 2 | 0 | 0 | 2 | 96 | 1 | 1 | 1 | 0 | 0 | 0 |
| (Republic of Ireland) Jake Carroll | 3 | 0 | 0 | 2 | 210 | 2 | 0 | 0 | 0 | 1 | 0 |
| (Republic of Ireland) Conor Kenna | 4 | 0 | 0 | 2 | 90 | 1 | 1 | 1 | 0 | 0 | 0 |
| (Republic of Ireland) Aidan Price | 5 | 0 | 0 | 1 | 78 | 1 | 0 | 1 | 0 | 1 | 0 |
| (Republic of Ireland) Greg Bolger | 6 | 0 | 1 | 2 | 165 | 1 | 1 | 0 | 0 | 0 | 0 |
| (Northern Ireland) Darren Meenan | 7 | 0 | 0 | 1 | 90 | 1 | 0 | 0 | 0 | 2 | 0 |
| (Republic of Ireland) James Chambers | 8 | 0 | 0 | 2 | 144 | 1 | 1 | 0 | 0 | 0 | 0 |
| (Republic of Ireland) Christy Fagan | 9 | 0 | 0 | 0 | 0 | 0 | 0 | 0 | 1 | 0 | 0 |
| (Republic of Ireland) Ian Daly | 10 | 1 | 1 | 2 | 210 | 2 | 0 | 0 | 0 | 0 | 0 |
| (Republic of Ireland) Sean O'Connor | 11 | 2 | 0 | 2 | 210 | 2 | 0 | 0 | 0 | 1 | 0 |
| (Republic of Ireland) Ian Bermingham | 12 | 0 | 0 | 1 | 45 | 1 | 0 | 0 | 1 | 0 | 0 |
| (Republic of Ireland) Pat Flynn | 13 | 0 | 1 | 2 | 210 | 2 | 0 | 0 | 0 | 1 | 0 |
| (Republic of Ireland) Mark Rossiter | 14 | 0 | 0 | 1 | 90 | 1 | 0 | 0 | 0 | 0 | 0 |
| (Republic of Ireland) Kenny Browne | 15 | 0 | 0 | 2 | 87 | 0 | 2 | 0 | 0 | 0 | 0 |
| (Republic of Ireland) Barry Murphy | 16 | 0 | 0 | 2 | 210 | 2 | 0 | 0 | 0 | 0 | 0 |
| (Republic of Ireland) Chris Forrester | 17 | 0 | 0 | 1 | 66 | 0 | 1 | 0 | 0 | 1 | 0 |
| (Republic of Ireland) John Russell | 18 | 0 | 0 | 1 | 120 | 1 | 0 | 0 | 0 | 1 | 0 |
| (Republic of Ireland) Jake Kelly | 19 | 0 | 0 | 1 | 54 | 1 | 0 | 1 | 0 | 0 | 0 |
| (Republic of Ireland) Stephen O'Flynn | 20 | 0 | 0 | 0 | 0 | 0 | 0 | 0 | 1 | 0 | 0 |
| (Republic of Ireland) Dean Kelly | 21 | 0 | 0 | 1 | 90 | 1 | 0 | 0 | 0 | 0 | 0 |
| (Republic of Ireland) Ryan Coombes | 22 | 0 | 0 | 0 | 0 | 0 | 0 | 0 | 1 | 0 | 0 |
| (Republic of Ireland) Kevin Farragher | 23 | 0 | 0 | 0 | 0 | 0 | 0 | 0 | 1 | 0 | 0 |

Setanta Cup
| Player | Number | Goals | Assists | Appearances | Minutes | Starts | Substitutes On | Substitutes Off | Unused Substitutes | Yellow Cards | Red Cards |
|---|---|---|---|---|---|---|---|---|---|---|---|
| (Republic of Ireland) Brendan Clarke | 1 | 0 | 0 | 1 | 90 | 1 | 0 | 0 | 1 | 0 | 0 |
| (Republic of Ireland) Ger O'Brien | 2 | 0 | 0 | 2 | 180 | 2 | 0 | 0 | 0 | 0 | 0 |
| (Republic of Ireland) Jake Carroll | 3 | 0 | 0 | 1 | 77 | 1 | 0 | 1 | 1 | 0 | 0 |
| (Republic of Ireland) Conor Kenna | 4 | 0 | 0 | 1 | 90 | 1 | 0 | 0 | 1 | 0 | 0 |
| (Republic of Ireland) Greg Bolger | 6 | 0 | 0 | 1 | 90 | 1 | 0 | 0 | 0 | 0 | 0 |
| (Northern Ireland) Darren Meenan | 7 | 0 | 0 | 1 | 67 | 1 | 0 | 1 | 1 | 0 | 0 |
| (Republic of Ireland) James Chambers | 8 | 0 | 0 | 2 | 179 | 2 | 0 | 1 | 0 | 0 | 0 |
| (Republic of Ireland) Christy Fagan | 9 | 0 | 0 | 1 | 170 | 2 | 0 | 1 | 0 | 0 | 0 |
| (Republic of Ireland) Ian Daly | 10 | 0 | 0 | 1 | 10 | 0 | 1 | 0 | 1 | 0 | 0 |
| (Republic of Ireland) Sean O'Connor | 11 | 0 | 0 | 2 | 103 | 1 | 1 | 0 | 0 | 0 | 0 |
| (Republic of Ireland) Ian Bermingham | 12 | 0 | 0 | 2 | 180 | 2 | 0 | 0 | 0 | 0 | 0 |
| (Republic of Ireland) Pat Flynn | 13 | 0 | 0 | 1 | 90 | 1 | 0 | 0 | 0 | 0 | 0 |
| (Republic of Ireland) Mark Rossiter | 14 | 0 | 0 | 2 | 91 | 1 | 1 | 0 | 0 | 0 | 0 |
| (Republic of Ireland) Kenny Browne | 15 | 0 | 0 | 2 | 180 | 2 | 0 | 0 | 0 | 1 | 0 |
| (Republic of Ireland) Barry Murphy | 16 | 0 | 0 | 1 | 90 | 1 | 0 | 0 | 1 | 0 | 0 |
| (Republic of Ireland) Chris Forrester | 17 | 0 | 0 | 1 | 90 | 1 | 0 | 0 | 0 | 0 | 0 |
| (Republic of Ireland) John Russell | 18 | 0 | 0 | 1 | 65 | 1 | 0 | 0 | 0 | 0 | 1 |
| (Republic of Ireland) Jake Kelly | 19 | 0 | 0 | 1 | 67 | 1 | 0 | 1 | 1 | 0 | 0 |
| (Republic of Ireland) Stephen O'Flynn | 20 | 0 | 0 | 2 | 46 | 0 | 2 | 0 | 0 | 0 | 0 |

Leinster Senior Cup
| Player | Number | Goals | Assists | Appearances | Minutes | Starts | Substitutes On | Substitutes Off | Unused Substitutes | Yellow Cards | Red Cards |
|---|---|---|---|---|---|---|---|---|---|---|---|
| (Republic of Ireland) Brendan Clarke | 1 | 0 | 0 | 0 | 0 | 0 | 0 | 0 | 2 | 0 | 0 |
| (Republic of Ireland) Jake Carroll | 3 | 0 | 1 | 2 | 180 | 2 | 0 | 0 | 0 | 2 | 0 |
| (Republic of Ireland) Aidan Price | 5 | 0 | 0 | 1 | 90 | 1 | 0 | 0 | 0 | 0 | 0 |
| (Northern Ireland) Darren Meenan | 7 | 0 | 0 | 1 | 90 | 1 | 0 | 0 | 0 | 0 | 0 |
| (Republic of Ireland) Christy Fagan | 9 | 1 | 0 | 1 | 90 | 1 | 0 | 0 | 0 | 0 | 0 |
| (Republic of Ireland) Ian Daly | 10 | 1 | 0 | 2 | 180 | 2 | 0 | 0 | 0 | 0 | 0 |
| (Republic of Ireland) Pat Flynn | 13 | 0 | 1 | 2 | 180 | 2 | 0 | 0 | 0 | 0 | 0 |
| (Republic of Ireland) Mark Rossiter | 14 | 0 | 0 | 1 | 90 | 1 | 0 | 0 | 0 | 0 | 0 |
| (Republic of Ireland) Barry Murphy | 16 | 0 | 0 | 1 | 90 | 1 | 0 | 0 | 0 | 0 | 0 |
| (Republic of Ireland) Chris Forrester | 17 | 2 | 0 | 1 | 90 | 1 | 0 | 0 | 0 | 0 | 0 |
| (Republic of Ireland) Jake Kelly | 19 | 0 | 1 | 1 | 90 | 1 | 0 | 0 | 0 | 0 | 0 |
| (Republic of Ireland) Dean Kelly | 21 | 0 | 0 | 1 | 90 | 1 | 0 | 0 | 0 | 0 | 0 |
| (Republic of Ireland) Ryan Coombes | 22 | 0 | 0 | 1 | 90 | 1 | 0 | 0 | 0 | 0 | 0 |
| (Republic of Ireland) Kevin Farragher | 23 | 0 | 0 | 2 | 180 | 2 | 0 | 0 | 0 | 0 | 0 |
| (Republic of Ireland) Eoin Hyland | 24 | 0 | 0 | 2 | 180 | 2 | 0 | 0 | 0 | 0 | 0 |
| (Republic of Ireland) Conor Pepper | N/A | 0 | 0 | 1 | 90 | 1 | 0 | 0 | 0 | 0 | 0 |
| (Republic of Ireland) Lee Brandon | N/A | 0 | 0 | 1 | 90 | 1 | 0 | 0 | 0 | 0 | 0 |
| (Republic of Ireland) Kevin Dempsey | N/A | 0 | 0 | 1 | 63 | 1 | 0 | 1 | 1 | 0 | 0 |
| (Republic of Ireland) Adam O'Connor | N/A | 0 | 0 | 1 | 27 | 0 | 1 | 0 | 1 | 0 | 0 |
| (Republic of Ireland) Jamie McGlynn | N/A | 0 | 0 | 0 | 0 | 0 | 0 | 0 | 2 | 0 | 0 |
| (Republic of Ireland) Rob Cornwall | N/A | 0 | 0 | 0 | 0 | 0 | 0 | 0 | 2 | 0 | 0 |
| (Republic of Ireland) Alex Prizeman | N/A | 0 | 0 | 0 | 0 | 0 | 0 | 0 | 1 | 0 | 0 |
| (Nigeria) Ismahil Akinade | N/A | 0 | 0 | 0 | 0 | 0 | 0 | 0 | 1 | 0 | 0 |
| (Romania) Mario Chindea | N/A | 0 | 0 | 0 | 0 | 0 | 0 | 0 | 1 | 0 | 0 |
| (Republic of Ireland) Aaron Behan | N/A | 0 | 0 | 0 | 0 | 0 | 0 | 0 | 1 | 0 | 0 |
| (Republic of Ireland) Niall Conran | N/A | 0 | 0 | 0 | 0 | 0 | 0 | 0 | 1 | 0 | 0 |

Friendlies
| Scorer | Goals |
|---|---|
| (Republic of Ireland) Mark Rossiter | 2 |
| (Republic of Ireland) Greg Bolger | 1 |
| (Republic of Ireland) James Chambers | 1 |
| (Republic of Ireland) Kenny Browne | 1 |
| (Republic of Ireland) Conor Kenna | 1 |
| (Republic of Ireland) Sean O'Connor | 1 |
| (Republic of Ireland) Vinny Faherty | 1 |

Last updated: 18 September 2012

=== Most frequent starting line-up ===

Most frequent starting line-up uses the team's most used formation: 4–3–3.
The players used are those who have played the most games in each respective position, not necessarily who have played most games out of all the players.

== Transfers ==
=== Pre-season ===
==== In ====
| Pos. | Name | From |
|---|---|---|
| GK | (Republic of Ireland) Barry Murphy | (Republic of Ireland) Bohemians |
| DF | (Republic of Ireland) Mark Rossiter | (Republic of Ireland) Bohemians |
| FW | (Republic of Ireland) Chris Forrester | (Republic of Ireland) Bohemians |
| DF | (Republic of Ireland) Ger O'Brien | (Republic of Ireland) Bohemians |
| FW | (Republic of Ireland) Christy Fagan | (Republic of Ireland) Boheminas |
| DF | (Republic of Ireland) Aidan Price | (Republic of Ireland) Bohemians |
| GK | (Republic of Ireland) Brendan Clarke | (Republic of Ireland) Sligo Rovers |
| MF | (Republic of Ireland) John Russell | (Republic of Ireland) Sligo Rovers |
| DF | (Republic of Ireland) Pat Flynn | (Republic of Ireland) Shamrock Rovers |
| FW | (Republic of Ireland) Dean Kelly | (Republic of Ireland) Shamrock Rovers |
| FW | (Republic of Ireland) Jake Kelly | (Republic of Ireland) Bray Wanderers |
| DF | (Republic of Ireland) Kenny Browne | (Republic of Ireland) Waterford United |
| MF | (Republic of Ireland) James Chambers | (Scotland) Hamilton Academical |
| MF | (Republic of Ireland) Greg Bolger | (Republic of Ireland) Dundalk |
| MF | (Northern Ireland) Darren Meenan | (Republic of Ireland) UCD |
| FW | (Republic of Ireland) Stephen O'Flynn | (Republic of Ireland) Limerick |

==== Out ====
| Pos. | Name | To |
|---|---|---|
| FW | (Republic of Ireland) John O'Connor | (Republic of Ireland) Bohemians |
| FW | (Republic of Ireland) Sean Stewart | (Republic of Ireland) Bohemians |
| MF | (Republic of Ireland) Dave Mulcahy | (Republic of Ireland) Bohemians |
| DF | (Republic of Ireland) Derek Pender | (Republic of Ireland) Bohemians |
| DF | (Republic of Ireland) Evan McMillan | (Republic of Ireland) Bohemians |
| DF | (Republic of Ireland) Neil Harney | (Republic of Ireland) Bohemians |
| GK | (Republic of Ireland) Gary Rogers | (Republic of Ireland) Sligo Rovers |
| FW | (England) Danny North | (Republic of Ireland) Sligo Rovers |
| MF | (Republic of Ireland) Anto Murphy | (Republic of Ireland) Shelbourne |
| DF | (Republic of Ireland) Brian Shortall | (Republic of Ireland) Shelbourne |
| MF | (Republic of Ireland) Stephen Bradley | (Republic of Ireland) Limerick |
| DF | (Republic of Ireland) Shane Guthrie | (Republic of Ireland) Limerick |
| FW | (Republic of Ireland) Daryl Kavanagh | (Republic of Ireland) Shamrock Rovers |
| MF | (Republic of Ireland) Shane McFaul | (Finland) FC Haka |
| MF | (Republic of Ireland) Paul Crowley | (Republic of Ireland) Drogheda United |
| GK | (Scotland) Chris Bennion | (Republic of Ireland) Monaghan United |

=== Summer ===
==== In ====
| Pos. | Name | From |
|---|---|---|
| FW | (Republic of Ireland) Anto Flood | (England) Southend United |
| FW | (Republic of Ireland) Vinny Faherty | (Australia) Moreland Zebras |
| DF | (Brazil) Hernany Macedo | (Republic of Ireland) Dundalk |
| MF | (Republic of Ireland) Gavin Boyne | (Republic of Ireland) St Patrick's Athletic Under 19's |
| DF | (Republic of Ireland) Sean Hoare | (Republic of Ireland) St Patrick's Athletic Under 19's |

==== Out ====
| Pos. | Name | To |
|---|---|---|
| FW | (Republic of Ireland) Ian Daly | (England) Bromley |
| MF | (Republic of Ireland) Conor Pepper | (Scotland) Inverness |
| FW | (Nigeria) Ismahil Akinade | (Republic of Ireland) Bray Wanderers |
| GK | (Republic of Ireland) Lee Brandon | (Republic of Ireland) Shelbourne Under 19's |
| DF | (Republic of Ireland) Aaron Behan | (Republic of Ireland) Released from St Patrick's Athletic Under 19's |
| FW | (Republic of Ireland) Kevin Dempsey | (Republic of Ireland) Released from St Patrick's Athletic Under 19's |
| FW | (Republic of Ireland) Adam O'Connor | (Republic of Ireland) Released from St Patrick's Athletic Under 19's |
| MF | (Republic of Ireland) Rob Cornwall | (Republic of Ireland) Released from St Patrick's Athletic Under 19's |
| FW | (Republic of Ireland) Alex Prizeman | (Republic of Ireland) Shelbourne |
| MF | (Republic of Ireland) Niall Conran | (Republic of Ireland) Released from St Patrick's Athletic Under 19's |
