= 2012 FAI Cup final =

- Event: 2012 FAI Cup
Derry City	St Patrick's Athletic
3	2
- Date: 4 November 2012
- Venue: Aviva Stadium, Dublin
- Referee: Neil Doyle
- Attendance: 16,117

The 2012 FAI Cup final was the final match of the 2012 FAI Cup, the national association football cup of the Republic of Ireland. The match took place on 4 November 2012 at the Aviva Stadium in Dublin. Derry City and St Patrick's Athletic contested the final, in what was a re-match of the 2006 FAI Cup Final. On that occasion, Derry City won the trophy, winning 4–3 after extra time. Derry later competed in the 2008 FAI Cup Final, where they lost against Bohemians, while St Patrick's Athletic had not contested the final since the 2006 encounter. It has been 51 years since St Patrick's Athletic last won the FAI Cup. Neil Doyle was the referee, with Emmet Dynan and Robert Clark as assistants and Damien Hancock as the fourth official. The cup was won by Derry City after extra time. The match was shown live on RTÉ Two and RTÉ Two HD in Ireland.

== Match ==
4 November 2012
15:30 CEST

Derry City	3–2 (a.e.t.)	St Patrick's Athletic
Greacen 55'; Patterson 69' (pen.), 105'	Report	O'Connor 53'; Fagan 87'

Aviva Stadium
Attendance: 16,117
Referee: Neil Doyle

Derry City	St Patrick's Athletic

Derry City:
Gerard Doherty	(yellow card) 109'
Shane McEleney
Dermot McCaffrey
Simon Madden
Stewart Greacen		(substituted off) 98'
Barry Molloy	(yellow card) 64'
Barry McNamee		(substituted off) 81'
Stephen McLaughlin
Patrick McEleney		(substituted off) 59'
Kevin Deery
David McDaid
Substitutes:
Ryan McBride		(substituted on) 98'
Rory Patterson	(yellow card) 70'	(substituted on) 59'
Ruaidhri Higgins	(yellow card) 116'	(substituted on) 81'
Eugene Ferry
Mark Farren
Marc Brolly
Caoimhinn Bonner
Manager: Declan Devine

St Patrick's Athletic:
Brendan Clarke
Kenny Browne
Ian Bermingham
Conor Kenna
Ger O'Brien		(substituted off) 105'
Chris Forrester
James Chambers	(yellow card) 111'
Jake Carroll	(yellow card) 20'	(substituted off) 24'
Jake Kelly		(substituted on) 45'
Sean O'Connor	(yellow card) 115'
Christy Fagan
Substitutes:
Pat Flynn		(substituted on) 105'
John Russell		(substituted on) 24'
Vinny Faherty		(substituted on) 45'
Barry Murphy
Aidan Price
Ryan Coombes
Anthony Flood
Manager: Liam Buckley
