= Seán O'Connor (Irish footballer) =

Irish footballer & coach (born 1983)

Personal information
- Date of birth: 21 October 1983 (age 43)
- Place of birth: Dublin, Ireland
- Position: Winger

Team information
- Current team: Athlone Town (manager)

Youth career
- Crumlin United

Senior career*
| Years | Team | Apps | (Gls) |
| 2005–2007 | St Patrick's Athletic | 54 | (12) |
| 2008–2010 | Shamrock Rovers | 76 | (21) |
| 2011 | Limerick | 12 | (3) |
| 2011–2012 | St Patrick's Athletic | 35 | (19) |
| 2013–2015 | Shamrock Rovers | 64 | (17) |

Managerial career
- 2017–2019: St Patrick's Athletic U15 (assistant)
- 2019–2021: St Patrick's Athletic U15
- 2019–2026: St Patrick's Athletic (assistant)
- 2021–2023: St Patrick's Athletic U19
- 2024: St Patrick's Athletic (interim)
- 2026–: Athlone Town
- * Club domestic league appearances and goals

Seán O'Connor (born 21 October 1983) is an Irish former professional footballer and current manager of League of Ireland First Division club Athlone Town. During his playing career he played for St Patrick's Athletic over two spells, Limerick & Shamrock Rovers over two spells. After retiring he started coaching in the academy of St Patrick's Athletic, he then remained at the club for 9 years though several academy and first team roles.

== Playing career ==
As a 17-year-old with Crumlin United, he was good enough to earn a trial with Preston North End, but any hopes he had of making a career across the water were dashed when he suffered a cruciate ligament injury on his return to Dublin.

=== St Patrick's Athletic ===
O'Connor is a midfielder and he joined St Patrick's Athletic from non-league side Crumlin United. He played for Ireland in the UEFA Regions' Cup in Poland in July 2005 and won 12 amateur caps in all. On his return from Poland John McDonnell (footballer) invited him to train with St Pats and he was signed shortly after. He made his League of Ireland debut on 22 July 2005 against Waterford United. He scored his first goal for Pats in the last game of the 2005 season. O'Connor also scored for Pats in their FAI Cup Final loss in 2006. He made 2 appearances for the Saints in the UEFA Cup during the 2007 season.

=== Shamrock Rovers ===
Seán signed for Shamrock Rovers (the Hoops) in November 2007. He made his competitive debut on 8 March 2008 and scored his first goal on 27 May.

O'Connor impressed in Rovers friendly against Real Madrid in July 2009

=== Limerick ===
O'Connor signed for his ex manager Pat Scully at Limerick in March 2011. And made his debut as a substitute in a 1–0 defeat away to Cork City on 19 March 2011. He wore the number 45 shirt. In July 2011 he cancelled his contract with Limerick.

=== Return to Inchicore ===
==== 2011 season ====
O'Connor was signed by Pete Mahon for St Patrick's Athletic midway through the 2011 season. He was given the number 14 shirt. He scored on his first game back at the club against UCD on 7 August 2011 at Richmond Park. O'Connor went on an excellent run of goal involvement in September, scoring two goals against Galway United in a 6–1 win on 3 September, two more in the Leinster Senior Cup against Killester United on the 6th including a 35-yard wonder goal, two assists versus Bray Wanderers on the 9th and two superb goals away to Dundalk, one from 25 yards into the top corner and another from 40 yards. O'Connor rounded off a brilliant season that he scored 9 goals in 11 appearances in all competitions, with a delicate half-volley from 25 yards to lob Ger Doherty in the Derry City goal in a 1–1 draw and a top corner free kick from 25 yards away to Drogheda United.

==== 2012 season ====
O'Connor signed a new contract to keep him at Pats for the 2012 season to the delight of saints fans. He changed his squad number to the traditional left midfielders number 11. O'Connor started the 2012 season well, providing an assist for Greg Bolger's goal vs Glebe North, scoring the goal in a 1–0 win over Mervue United in friendly games and setting up Dean Kelly and John Russell's goals against Bray Wanderers and Dundalk respectively in the first two games of the season. O'Connor opened the scoring in the league cup against UCD and later captained his side for the first time when Ger O'Brien was taken off after 66 minutes. O'Connor came on off the bench away to Sligo Rovers and headed in the equaliser after 72 minutes in a 1–1 draw live on RTÉ. A week later RTÉ viewers once again witnessed an O'Connor goal, this time away to Derry City, after his swerving shot from 25 yards was spilled into the goal by keeper Ger Doherty. O'Connor had a great impact off the bench in the Dublin derby against Bohemians when he put in a world class cross for Christy Fagan to head home in the 4th minute of injury time in a 2–1 win at Richmond Park. Just four days later and he was action in another Dublin derby, this time at home to his old club Shamrock Rovers in the 2012 League of Ireland Cup quarter-final. O'Connor scored a header in the 27th minute to make it 1–1 after a good cross from Pat Flynn. The game went to extra time and penalties and O'Connor took Pats' first and scored on Reyaad Pieterse in the Rovers goal. He made his 100th appearance for the club when he came off the bench in a 1–1 draw away to Shamrock Rovers. O'Connor scored in the 2012 FAI Cup final at the Aviva Stadium at the same end against the same opposition as the 2006 final but came out on the losing side to Derry City again.

=== Return to Rovers ===
O'Connor signed back for Rovers in a two-year deal in November 2012. In August 2013, he gave the St Patrick's Athletic fans the finger as he was sent off at Tallaght Stadium as they beat his side 4–0 on the way to the 2013 title. He went to win the Setanta Sports Cup and League of Ireland Cup medals for Rovers that season, scoring the second of seven goals against Drogheda United in the 2013 Setanta Sports Cup Final, and in the league he contributed five goals in 29 appearances. He continued his run in the team into the 2014 season, playing in twenty-five league games and scoring four goals as Rovers finished fourth. He also made one appearance for Shamrock Rovers B, scoring in a 1–1 draw with Galway. O'Connor stayed with Rovers for the 2015 season and he went on to make ten league appearances, scoring twice in the process, as they finished third in the league. He left the club at the end of the season. O'Connor retired from football in 2016.

== Coaching career ==
In 2017, O'Connor joined St Patrick's Athletic's Academy as assistant manager of the under–15 side, before taking over as manager in 2019 and leading the side to a league title in his first season. He also joined the first team coaching staff in 2019, working under managers Harry Kenny, Stephen O'Donnell, Tim Clancy, Jon Daly and Stephen Kenny between 2019 and 2026. He also managed the club's under–19 side between 2021 and 2023, winning a league title with them in 2022 and managing the UEFA Youth League. In May 2024, he served as interim manager of the first team following Jon Daly's sacking, guiding the side to a 2–2 draw away to Shamrock Rovers before the appointment of Stephen Kenny.

On 14 July 2026, he was appointed manager of League of Ireland First Division club Athlone Town.

== Managerial statistics ==
As of match played on 16 October 2026

Managerial record by team and tenure
| Team | From | To | Record | | | | | | | |
| Team | From | To | G | W | D | L | GF | GA | GD | Win % |
|---|---|---|---|---|---|---|---|---|---|---|
| St Patrick's Athletic (interim) | 7 May 2024 | 16 May 2024 | 1 | 0 | 1 | 0 | 2 | 2 | +0 | 0.00 |
| Athlone Town | 14 July 2026 | Present | 15 | 7 | 3 | 5 | 25 | 19 | +6 | 46.67 |
| Total | | | 16 | 7 | 4 | 5 | 27 | 21 | +6 | 43.75 |

== Honours ==
=== Club ===
St Patrick's Athletic

- Leinster Senior Cup (1): 2011

Shamrock Rovers

- League of Ireland (1): 2010
- Setanta Sports Cup (1): 2013
- League of Ireland Cup (1): 2013

=== Individual ===
- PFAI Premier Division Team of the Year (1): 2009, 2012
