= Conor Kenna =

Irish footballer

Personal information
- Date of birth: 21 August 1984 (age 42)
- Place of birth: Dublin, Ireland
- Position: Centre back

Youth career
- Kilnamanagh AFC
- Lourdes Celtic
- Cherry Orchard
- 2000–2003: Coventry City

Senior career*
Years	Team	Apps	(Gls)
2003	Shelbourne		
2004–2008	UCD		
2009	Drogheda United	33	(4)
2010–2013	St Patrick's Athletic	109	(3)
2014–2015	Shamrock Rovers	56	(1)
2016–2018	Bray Wanderers	60	(1)
2019	Longford Town	29	(0)
2020–	Kilnamanagh AFC		

International career
2000	Republic of Ireland U16	2	(0)
2009–2009	Republic of Ireland U23	3	(0)
2010	League of Ireland XI	1	(0)
- * Club domestic league appearances and goals

Conor Kenna (born 21 August 1984) is an Irish retired footballer who played as a centre back.

== Club career ==
=== Shelbourne & UCD ===
Kenna began his League of Ireland career with Shelbourne where he was a primary figure in the Reds' under 21 squad and was briefly part of their first team squad. He left Shels prior to the start of 2004 League of Ireland season to join First Division UCD for whom he helped to promotion to the Premier Division with a 2nd-place finish. His primary role was at centre back although he deputised on many occasions at left back for UCD in spite of being right footed. Kenna formed a highly successful partnership at centre back with Alan McNally in a defence that gave up the fourth fewest goals in the 2006 League of Ireland season. Kenna was called into an Irish U-21 squad in 2005 but had to withdraw through injury. He was appointed UCD captain in the 2008 pre-season to replace the retired Tony McDonnell. He scored his first competitive goal for UCD in a 3–2 defeat to Derry City on 7 March 2008.

=== Drogheda United ===
Following UCD's relegation to the First Division at the end of the 2008 season, Kenna signed for Drogheda United in February 2009. Kenna made 38 competitive appearances and scored 5 goals for Drogheda in 2009 as the Louth club retained their Premier Division status.

=== St Patrick's Athletic ===
Kenna signed for St Patrick's Athletic on 9 February 2010, linking up at the Inchicore club with his former UCD manager Pete Mahon, who selected him as club captain. Kenna became a fan's favourite at Inchicore and received the St. Patrick's Athletic Supporters Club Player of the Year award in 2010. Kenna also earned the nickname 'Kennavaro' after brilliant performances similar to famous World Cup winning central defender Fabio Cannavaro. He played every minute of every game in all competitions for the Saints in 2010 and didn't get a single yellow or red card all season. It was widely speculated that Kenna would join 2010 league winners and Dublin rivals Shamrock Rovers but he stayed loyal to his club and this made him even more of a popular figure with the fans.

2011 looked to be a promising season for the Saints but his footballing career came into doubt when he sustained an injury to a tendon in his knee in the second league game of the season against Bray Wanderers at Richmond Park on 11 March. He returned from his long injury setback in a 0–0 draw away to Sligo Rovers on 27 July, Kenna wasn't expected to return so early as he was still building up his fitness but Mahon was forced to play him due to players being tired from a tough game against FC Shakhter Karagandy and he lasted the first 68 minutes before being replaced by Brian Shortall. Kenna went on to regain his place in the starting line up, pushing Shortall to the bench. Kenna scored in a 1–0 win over Sligo at Richmond Park in a huge match in the 2011 title run-in After Kenna returned from injury his performances were just a shadow of his 2010 performances which many fans put down to finding his feet again after the long period without playing games.

Indeed, they were correct as Kenna regained his excellent form in defence and the Saints found themselves with 3 clean sheets and just 2 goals conceded after the first 5 games of the 2012 season. Kenna played a big part in Pats' 2012 Europa League campaign, playing every game and setting up Stephen O'Flynn's goal against Íþróttabandalag Vestmannaeyja in extra-time at the Hásteinsvöllur, Iceland and also setting up Christy Fagan's winning goal in extra-time against NK Široki Brijeg from Bosnia and Herzegovina at Richmond Park to earn a tie against Hannover 96, whom he played against in the 49,000 seater AWD-Arena. He captained the Pats side in their first ever appearance at the Aviva Stadium in the 2012 FAI Cup Final on 4 November 2012, but unfortunately for Kenna and the Saints, they lost 3–2 after extra time to Derry City meaning the club's FAI Cup drought was extended to 52 years.

Kenna continued his excellent form alongside his partner at Centre back, Kenny Browne into the 2013 season, with the captain maintaining his spot in the starting eleven and heavily contributing to what was the joint best defence in the league, with just 10 goals conceded after 20 games, as his Pats side sat top of the league. He made his 350th career appearance in a famous 4–0 win away to Shamrock Rovers in the South Dublin derby on 9 August 2013. Kenna made his 100th league appearance for Pats on 16 August 2013 in a 1–0 over Shelbourne at Richmond Park. On 13 October 2013, one year on from losing the 2012 title to Sligo Rovers as a result of a last minute penalty given against Kenna, he marked his 150th appearance for Pats by skippering the team to a 2–0 win at home to Sligo to clinch the 2013 League title. Kenna lifted the League of Ireland trophy at Richmond Park on 20 October 2013 following a 1–1 draw with Derry City, Pats' ninth league title. Kenna's last game for the Saints was in a 4–2 loss away to Cork City on the final day of the season.

=== Shamrock Rovers ===
Kenna signed for Shamrock Rovers in November 2013

Conor's only goal for Rovers was scored in the 26 July 2015 league match at Tallaght Stadium against Limerick FC, a 4–1 home win.

=== Bray Wanderers ===
Conor signed for Bray Wanderers in December 2015, and spent three seasons with the Wicklow club, most of them as captain on the pitch or as Club Captain.

=== Longford Town ===
Having departed Bray after the 2018 season, Kenna signed for Longford Town in February 2019. He helped Longford to a third-place finish in the 2019 First Division season and was named on the PFAI First Division Team of the Year.

He announced his retirement from the game on 28 November 2019.

=== Later career ===
In 2018 and 2019, Kenna worked with the PFAI to help out-of-contract players land League of Ireland clubs.

On 10 January 2020, Kenna returned from his retirement to play for Irish Leinster Senior League club Kilnamanagh AFC, the club he also played for as a child. Kenna already worked for the club as director of coaching for the past 12 months, before joining the playing squad.

== International career ==
In October 2000, Kenna played for the Republic of Ireland U16s in a qualifying tournament in Riga for the 2001 UEFA European Under-16 Championship where he came up against Andrés Iniesta.

He made his debut at U23 level in November 2007 in the 2007–09 International Challenge Trophy . His second appearance came in May 2008. He made his third and last appearance at this level in a defeat to Belgium in October 2008.

== Honours ==
=== Club ===
St Patrick's Athletic

- League of Ireland Premier Division (1): 2013
- Leinster Senior Cup (1): 2011

=== Individual ===
- League of Ireland Player of the Month (1): March 2010
- PFAI Premier Division Team of the Year (1): 2010
- PFAI First Division Team of the Year (1): 2019
- St Patrick's Athletic Player of the Season (1): 2010

Sporting positions
Preceded by Damian Lynch	St Patrick's Athletic captain 2010–2013	Succeeded by Ger O'Brien
