= 2013 Setanta Sports Cup final =

- Event: 2013 Setanta Sports Cup
Shamrock Rovers	Drogheda United
(Republic of Ireland)	(Republic of Ireland)
7	1
- Date: 11 May 2013
- Venue: Tallaght Stadium, Dublin
- Referee: Rob Rogers
- Attendance: 4,022

The 2013 Setanta Sports Cup final was the final match of the 2013 Setanta Sports Cup, an all-Ireland association football competition. The match took place on 11 May 2013 in Tallaght Stadium, home of one of the participating teams, Shamrock Rovers. Drogheda United were the other side to contest the final. Shamrock Rovers won the match 7–1 to win their first trophy under manager Trevor Croly.

11 May 2013
15:00

Shamrock Rovers (Republic of Ireland)	7–1	(Republic of Ireland) Drogheda United
Chambers 11' O'Connor 13' Sheppard 45' Finn 55' Finn 56' Dennehy 75' Dennehy 88'	Report	Gary O'Neill 65'

Tallaght Stadium, Dublin
Attendance: 4,022
Referee: Rob Rogers
