= Vinny Faherty =

Irish footballer (born 1987)

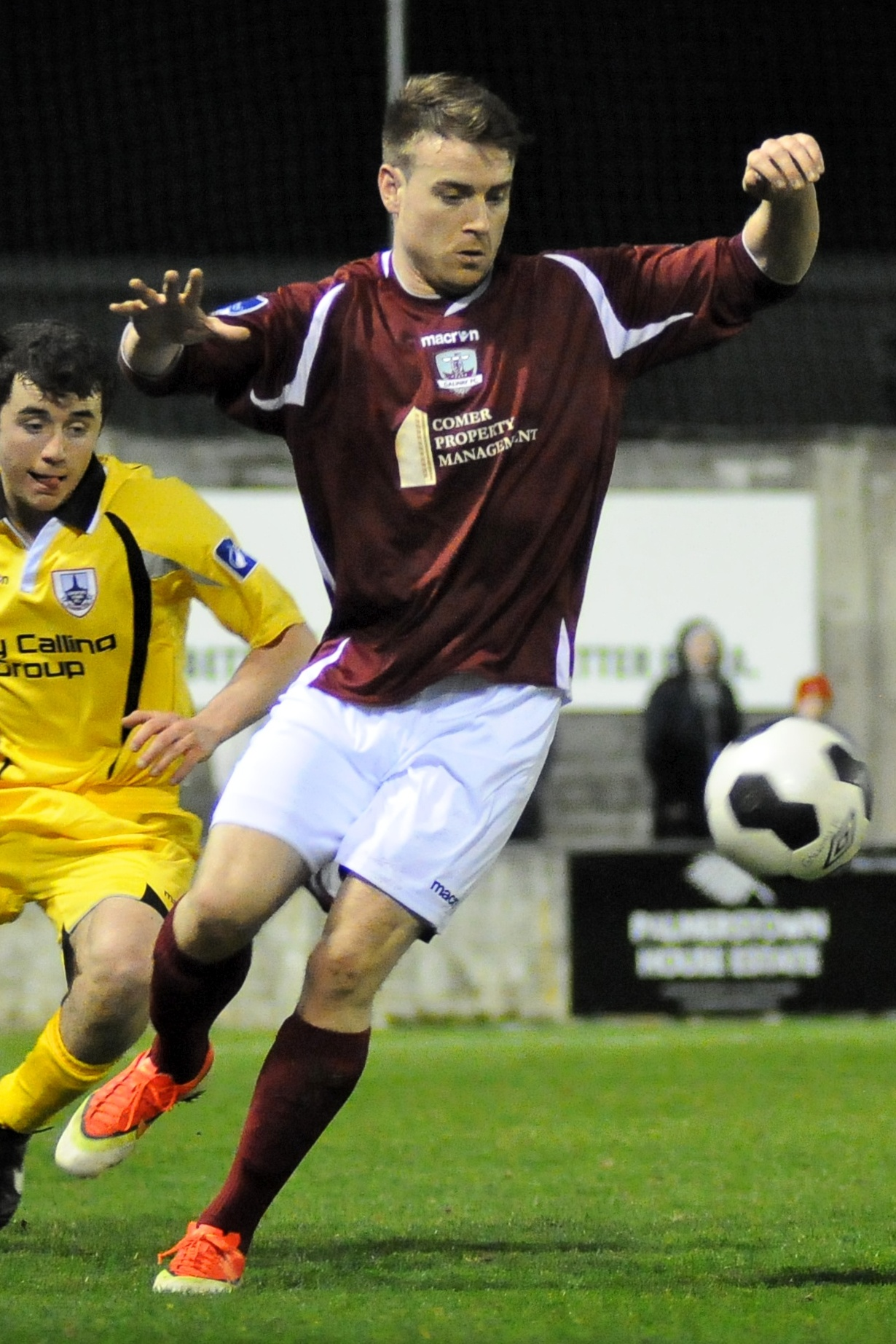
- Vinny Faherty (middle) playing for Galway United in 2014

Personal information
- Full name: Vincent Faherty
- Date of birth: 13 June 1987 (age 39)
- Place of birth: Galway, Ireland
- Position: Forward

Youth career
- 2003–2006: Salthill Devon

Senior career*
Years	Team	Apps	(Gls)
2007–2009	Galway United	73	(18)
2010	St Patrick's Athletic	33	(10)
2011–2012	Melbourne Zebras	20	(14)
2012	St Patrick's Athletic	11	(5)
2013	Dundalk	22	(1)
2014	Galway United	25	(11)
2015	Limerick	28	(12)
2016–2017	Galway United	51	(14)
2017	Sligo Rovers	9	(3)
2018–2019	PAEEK	11	(1)
2019–2020	Galway United	34	(10)
Total		317	(99)
- * Club domestic league appearances and goals

Vincent Faherty (born 13 June 1987) is an Irish former professional footballer.

== Club career ==
=== Early career ===
Born in Galway, Faherty began his career as a youngster with Salthill Devon. While playing for the Galway representative team, he broke Kevin Doyle's scoring record in the under-18 FAI Youth Interleague competition with 21 goals. As captain of Salthill Devon's under-21 team, he opened the scoring in the 2006 Dr Tony O'Neill Cup semi-final against Sligo Rovers F.C., and led his side to victory in the final, beating Cork City 2–1 to become the first club without a team in the League of Ireland to succeed at that level. In early 2007, Faherty spent two spells on trial with Ipswich Town of the English Championship. He scored twice against Millwall in a friendly, and played for the reserve team against Luton Town, but no contract ensued.

=== Galway United ===
After three years with Salthill Devon, Faherty chose to defer going to college and, despite interest from clubs including Ipswich Town and Coventry City, joined Galway United, his hometown team, in July 2007. Described by the Galway Advertiser as having "impressed when introduced for his debut" against Cork City, he appeared regularly for the remainder of the season, sometimes in the starting eleven but more often as a substitute. Faherty's first senior goal for the club coincided with Jeff Kenna's first game as manager, as Galway lost 3–2 at home to Bray Wanderers in April 2008. He finished the 2008 season as the clubs second highest goal scorer behind Jay O'Shea and finished with the clubs most assists. In a column on the official eircom League of Ireland website, journalist Gareth Maher listed Faherty among the league's top five young prospects alongside the likes of Seamus Coleman. The following year he finished as the club's top scorer and also notched up 17 assists, which was the highest total in the league.

=== St Patrick's Athletic ===
Faherty and teammate John Russell were linked with a move to Scottish Premier League club Hibernian in November 2009, and Faherty also had a trial with Crystal Palace of the English Championship. However, Palace's reserve games were postponed because of heavy snow, and when Faherty discovered that players were not being paid because of the club's financial difficulties, he returned to Ireland and signed for St Patrick's Athletic for the 2010 season.

Faherty scored on his St Patrick's Athletic debut against Wexford Youths in a 3–0 victory for the Saints in pre-season. He started the season well, chalking up goals and assists, and was central to a team that found itself top of the table and in the Setanta Sports Cup Final. Faherty finished the 2010 league season as St. Patrick's Athletic's top scorer, with his goals including a diving header against rivals Shamrock Rovers and away to Bohemians.

He left St Patrick's at the end of the season to sign for Karşıyaka S.K. in Turkish 2. Lig.

=== Australia ===
After the proposed move to Turkey fell through late in negotiations, Faherty signed for Australian club Melbourne Zebras of the National Premier Leagues for the 2011 season. His 14 goals from 20 league games made him the club's top scorer, playing a decisive role in their title winning campaign. Zebras confirmed that Faherty had signed on again for the 2012 season.

=== Return to St Patrick's Athletic ===
Faherty returned to Ireland and joined up again with close friend John Russell when he re-signed for St Patrick's Athletic on the League of Ireland's July transfer deadline day. He was named in the squad for the third qualifying round of the 2012-13 Europa League campaign. He made his competitive return as a late substitute in a 1–0 win over Cork City on 13 August, and scored his first competitive goal on his home debut in a 3–0 win over Derry City when he "swivelled onto a ball at the edge of the Derry box and unleashed a lethal finish that dipped over Doherty but under his crossbar". This earned him his first start, away to Dublin rivals Bohemians. Faherty again scored in a Dublin derby for Pats with an injury-time header to complete a 2–0 win against Shelbourne at Tolka Park. Faherty scored a 90th-minute equaliser away to Drogheda United in the FAI Cup quarter-final replay to take the game into extra time, and converted his kick in the ensuing penalty shootout to help the Saints reach the semi-finals. He scored his first hat-trick for the club in a 5–0 win over UCD at Richmond Park on 1 October.

=== Return to Galway United ===
Faherty was signed by Tommy Dunne for Galway's inaugural season in the League of Ireland. He scored the club's first goal, in a 5–2 friendly win over Sligo Rovers, then scored their first league goal, against Finn Harps at Finn Park on 29 March 2014, and became the first Galway player to score a hat-trick when he claimed the match ball within 19 minutes against Cobh Ramblers on 25 July.

=== Limerick ===
Faherty joined Limerick for the 2015 season, and played in a central or wide midfield role for the majority of the first half of the season. Limerick failed to win a game until the 22nd game of the season, when two goals from Faherty contributed to a 3–2 win against Sligo. This was the start of a run of goals for Faherty, who scored 7 more goals in the following 8 games as Limerick put together a run of results in their attempt to avoid relegation from the Premier League. Faherty won the League of IrelandPlayer of the Month Award and finished the season as Limerick's top scorer and the third-highest scorer in the Premier Division. Following Limerick's eventual relegation after a play-off, Faherty returned to Galway United.

=== Galway United ===
Faherty signed for Galway United again for the 2016 season and was a central figure in their Premier Division campaign. He finished the season as the club's top scorer with 12 league goals, a tally that made him the third highest goalscorer in the Premier Division. In addition to his goalscoring return, he contributed 8 assists, underlining his importance to United's attacking play throughout the campaign. He was also runner-up to Ronan Finn for the Premier Division Player of the Month Award in April, in a season that was ultimately disappointing for United, after early season promise had them as high as 3rd in May.

=== Sligo Rovers ===
On 31 July 2017, Faherty moved to fellow Irish Premier Division club Sligo Rovers. He made his league debut for the club on 5 August, as a second-half substitute in a 1–1 home draw with St Patrick's Athletic, he shot over the bar with the last kick of the match. His first league goal opened the scoring in a 2–1 away win over Finn Harps on 16 September, where he also assisted the last minute winner. Two weeks later, he scored the winning goal in a 1–0 home victory over Bohemians. He also scored in a 3–0 win against Derry City during the run in.

His impact after arriving mid-season saw him regarded as one of the two principal catalysts for Sligo Rovers’ survival push, alongside former Glasgow Rangers player Rhys McCabe.

=== Cyprus ===
Faherty left Sligo Rovers at the end of the 2017 season and signed for Nicosia-based Cypriot side PAEEK. He spent 12 months in Cyprus and returned to Ireland for the 2019 season.

=== Back to Galway United ===
Faherty rejoined Galway United in January 2019. On 9 November 2020, Faherty announced that he would retire from professional football, bringing a 14-year career to an end. Faherty made over 200 appearances for Galway United and finished as the clubs third highest all time scorer before stepping away from playing at the age of 33.

Since his retirement from playing, Faherty has been involved in a variety of media roles, including appearing on local and national football podcasts and providing live television match-day commentary for League of Ireland games as part of his ongoing involvement in Irish football coverage

== International career ==
Faherty's performances for Salthill earned him selection for the Republic of Ireland at various levels. He played for the Irish amateur team against Northern Ireland in March 2007, scoring twice and creating a third, in an amateur international against Scotland in April, and for the Under-21 representative team in the 2007 Four Nations Tournament. In 2010, Faherty played for the Republic of Ireland under-23s in a training match against the senior national squad.
