= Ian Daly =

Irish football player

Personal information
- Full name: Ian Gerard Daly
- Date of birth: 29 March 1990 (age 36)
- Place of birth: Dublin, Ireland
- Positions: Midfielder; forward

Team information
- Current team: UCC Diaspora

Youth career
- 1998–2004: Broadford Rovers
- 2004–2006: Home Farm
- 2006–2009: Manchester City

Senior career*
Years	Team	Apps	(Gls)
2009–2010	Aris	7	(0)
2010–2011	Cádiz	1	(0)
2011–2012	St Patrick's Athletic	30	(2)
2012–2013	Bromley	7	(0)
2013–2014	Dulwich Hamlet	30	(6)
2014–	Cray Wanderers	?	(?)
2019–present	UCC Diaspora	7	(4)

International career
	Republic of Ireland U15	?	(?)
	Republic of Ireland U16	?	(?)
	Republic of Ireland U17	?	(?)
	Republic of Ireland U18	?	(?)
2008–2009	Republic of Ireland U19	8	(0)
2010–	Republic of Ireland U21	1	(1)
- * Club domestic league appearances and goals

Ian Daly (born 29 March 1990, in Dublin) is an Irish football player who plays for Cray Wanderers in the Isthmian League North Division.

== Club career ==
Daly started his career with local club Broadford Rovers and spent two seasons at Home Farm FC, before joining Manchester City in July 2006. He was part of the Manchester City youth team that won the 2008 FA Youth Cup.

In July 2009, Daly joined Greek Super League team Aris on a two-year contract. During his time at Aris, Daly worked with coach Hector Cuper who showed his trust in Daly by giving him the opportunity to play against teams such as Olympiacos and AEK Athens. He played in a trial match for Bristol Rovers on 24 August 2010 at Cheltenham Town and scored a goal in a 1–0 win. In August 2010, Cádiz CF of the Spanish Segunda División B announced the signing of Daly on transfer deadline day. Daly made his competitive debut on 14 November 2010 in 2–1 defeat to Lorca Atlético, but left the club by mutual consent on 28 January 2011.

=== St Patrick's Athletic ===
Daly signed for St Patrick's Athletic on a one-year deal on Monday 28 February 2011, given the number 24 shirt. He made his Pats debut in the away trip to Galway United when he came off the bench late on. Daly scored his first goal for Pats in a 2–0 win over Bray Wanderers in the Leinster Senior Cup at the Carlisle Grounds on 14 March 2011. Daly scored his first league goal away to Dundalk in the 69th minute to level the scores at 1–1 after coming on from the bench after 63 minutes. The Saints once again faced County Louth opposition the following Friday, in the form of Drogheda United. Daly played the full game and scored the fourth goal in a 4–1 win at Hunky Dorys Park. Daly played a big part in Pats' 2011–12 UEFA Europa League campaign, setting up Dave McMillan's equalizer away to FC Shakhter Karagandy in Kazakhstan, playing in all six games and scoring against ÍBV from Iceland in the first round. Daly signed a one-year extension to his contract to keep him at the club for the 2012 season. Daly's first goal of the 2012 season came in a 4–0 win over Phoenix in the Leinster Senior Cup at Richmond Park. He scored his second goal of the season in a 2–1 win over U.C.D in the 2012 League of Ireland Cup. Daly missed a penalty in the defeat against rivals Shamrock Rovers in the EA Sports Cup quarter final and this turned out to be his final appearance for Pats as he requested that his contract was terminated by mutual consent in search of first team football.

=== Bromley ===
In September 2012, following his departure from St Patrick's Athletic, the young midfielder signed for English Conference South side Bromley.

=== Dulwich Hamlet ===
After featuring in a pre-season friendly for Dulwich Hamlet against his former club Bromley, he signed for them in August 2013. He spent one season at the club, moving on at the end of the 2013–2014 Isthmian League Premier Division Season, during which he made a total of 40 appearances and scored 12 goals in all competitions.

=== Cray Wanderers ===
Following his release from Dulwich Hamlet, Daly signed with Cray Wanderers ahead of the 2014–15 Isthmian League North Division season.

== International career ==
Daly is an Ireland U21 International, having scored on his U21 debut on 3 March 2010 in a UEFA U21 European Championship qualifier against Armenia U21s. The game ended in a 2–1 defeat for Ireland.

Previously, Daly made appearances as the leading scorer for Ireland's U-15, U-16, U-17, U-18 and U-19 teams. In March 2007, he scored two goals when representing the Ireland U-17 team in their victory over Scotland in Germany during their first game at the UEFA European Under-17 qualification

== Honours ==
St Patrick's Athletic

- Leinster Senior Cup (1): 2011

== Career statistics ==
Professional appearances – correct as of 5 July 2012

Club	Season	League		Cup		League Cup		Europa League		Leinster Senior Cup		Setanta Cup		Total	
Club	Season	Apps	Goals	Apps	Goals	Apps	Goals	Apps	Goals	Apps	Goals	Apps	Goals	Apps	Goals
Aris	2009–10	7	0	0	0	0	0	0	0	-	-	-	-	7	0
Cádiz CF	2010–11	1	0	0	0	0	0	-	-	-	-	-	-	1	0
St Patrick's Athletic
St Patrick's Athletic	2011	22	2	3	0	1	0	6	1	5	1	0	0	37	4
St Patrick's Athletic	2012	8	0	0	0	2	1	0	0	1	1	0	0	11	2
St Patrick's Athletic	2012–13														
Bromley F.C.	2012–13	0	0	0	0	0	0	0	0	0	0	0	0	0	0
Career total		48	2	3	0	3	1	6	1	6	2	0	0	56	6
