= Mark Rossiter =

Irish footballer

Personal information
- Date of birth: 27 May 1983 (age 43)
- Place of birth: Oranmore, Ireland
- Position: Defender

Youth career
- Galway United

Senior career*
| Years | Team | Apps | (Gls) |
| 2002–2004 | Sunderland | 10 | (0) |
| 2005 | Finn Harps | 0 | (0) |
| 2007–2011 | Bohemians | 111 | (7) |
| 2012 | St Patrick's Athletic | 6 | (0) |
| 2013–2014 | Dundalk | 34 | (0) |
| 2015–2016 | Longford Town | 27 | (1) |

International career
| 1999–2000 | Republic of Ireland U16 | 12 | (0) |
- Republic of Ireland U18
- * Club domestic league appearances and goals as of 23:48, 6 July 2016 (UTC)

Mark Rossiter (born 27 May 1983) is an Irish retired footballer.

== Club career ==
Rossiter began his career at English Premier League side Sunderland, signing on as a professional at the Stadium of Light in the summer of 2002. On 6 November 2002, he made his senior debut in the League Cup third round, playing the whole 90 minutes as Sunderland beat Arsenal 3–2 at Highbury. He played in the League Cup fourth round against First Division side Sheffield United on 3 December, The Black Cats lost the game 2–0 at Bramall Lane. On 4 January 2003, Rossiter played in the 1-1 FA Cup third round draw at Bolton Wanderers. He came on for the injured Stephen Wright after 16 minutes, only to get injured himself and replaced by Joachim Björklund just 11 minutes later. This turned out to be his last appearance for Sunderland. Whilst playing for the Republic of Ireland U21s on 1 April, he ruptured his anterior cruciate ligament in a 1–0 defeat against Albania, during the Under-21 European Championship qualifying. The injury required surgery and would keep Rossiter sidelined until at least Christmas. In May 2003, he was offered a new two-year contract at Sunderland by manager Mick McCarthy. He didn't feature during the 2003–04 season and was released from his contract in May 2004.

He retired from the game for a period before returning home to play for Finn Harps in 2005.

Sean Connor brought him out of retirement to Bohs in early 2007.

Bohs romped to the 2008 Premier Division title by 19 points from their nearest challengers St Patrick's Athletic with "Rossi" scoring vital goals against Shamrock Rovers and Cork City along the way. He also added an FAI Cup winners medal to his collection as Bohs beat Derry City on penalties to complete the "Double".

Rossiter enjoyed a mixed season during 2009 and was at fault for a crucial Red Bull Salzburg goal, which cost Bohemians a place in the 3rd qualifying round of the Champions League. With four minutes remaining and Bohemians on course to go through on the away goals rule, a tired header back to the goalkeeper fell short and was punished ruthlessly by Patrik Ježek. However brighter times were ahead as Mark collected his second League winners medal in a row in November as they won the title by 4 points from rivals Shamrock Rovers.

The following year was not as successful as Mark struggled to keep a place in the starting XI for the Gypsies. Bohemians also had a disappointing 2010 season where the club lost their league title on goal difference and failed to make an impact in Europe where they made an embarrassing exit to Welsh side The New Saints. When his contract expired at the end of the season, he was released by Bohs. However, in February 2011, Pat Fenlon re-signed Mark just in time for the new season.

Rossiter signed for St.Patrick's Athletic for the 2012 season and scored on his debut away to Glebe North in a friendly. Rossiter captained the side in a 4–0 win over Phoenix in the Leinster Senior Cup Unfortunately he picked but a season-ending injury away to Derry City on 4 May 2012.

Rossiter played for Dundalk for two seasons, winning his third League of Ireland medal and also a League Cup medal in 2014.

He then signed for Longford Town on 29 December 2014 ahead of the 2015 season. Rossiter played a key role in helping Longford finish in a credible 6th place at the end of the 2015 League of Ireland Premier Division season. Injury limited his appearances in the 2016 season and he was released, by mutual consent, on 6 July 2016.

== International career ==
He has also represented his country at U16 at the 2000 UEFA European Under-16 Championship, U18, U19 levels and at the European Youth Olympic Festival.

== Honours ==
- League of Ireland: 3
  - Bohemians – 2008, 2009
  - Dundalk – 2014
- FAI Cup:
  - Bohemians – 2008
- Setanta Sports Cup:
  - Bohemians – 2009–10
- League of Ireland Cup:
  - Dundalk – 2014
