= Ger O'Brien =

Irish footballer

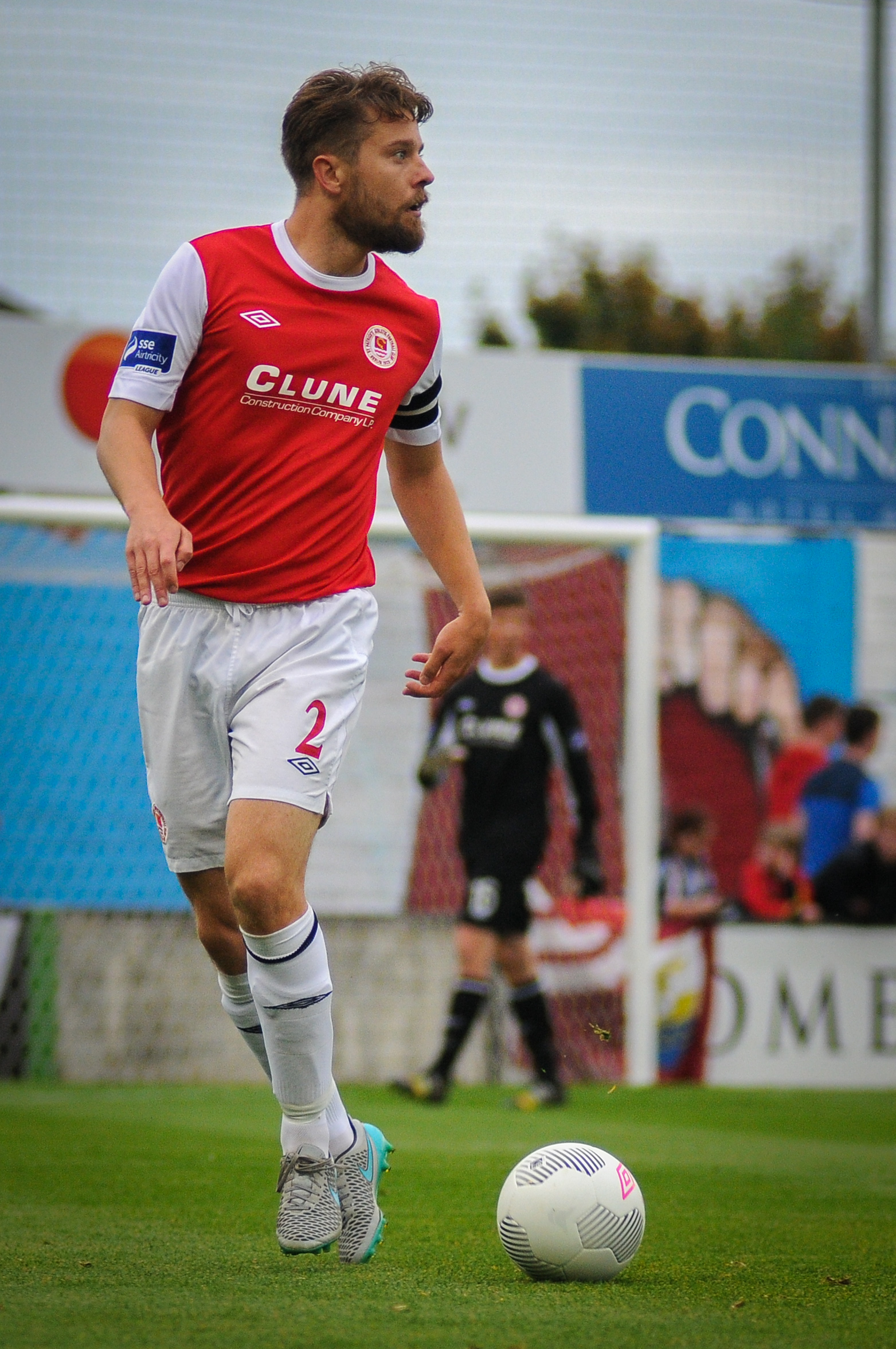
- O'Brien in action against Galway United in the 2015 League of Ireland Cup Final.

Personal information
- Full name: Gerard O'Brien
- Date of birth: 2 July 1984 (age 42)
- Place of birth: Dublin, Ireland
- Position: Right back

Team information
- Current team: St Patrick's Athletic (Director of Football)

Youth career
- Cherry Orchard
- St Patrick's Athletic

Senior career*
Years	Team	Apps	(Gls)
2003	St Patrick's Athletic	0	(0)
2003	→ Athlone Town (loan)	32	(1)
2004–2005	Kildare County	68	(5)
2006–2008	Shamrock Rovers	87	(0)
2009	Derry City	29	(0)
2010	Sporting Fingal	30	(1)
2011	Bohemians	30	(2)
2012–2017	St Patrick's Athletic	135	(1)

International career
2007–2008	Republic of Ireland U23	3	(1)
2011	League of Ireland XI	1	(0)

Managerial career
- 2013–2015: NUI Maynooth
- 2016–2024: St Patrick's Athletic (Academy Director)
- 2017–2019: St Patrick's Athletic (Assistant Manager)
- 2018: St Patrick's Athletic (Interim Manager)
- 2024–: St Patrick's Athletic (Director of Football)
- * Club domestic league appearances and goals

Gerard O'Brien (born 2 July 1984) is an Irish former professional footballer who played in the League of Ireland as a defender. He is the current Director of Football at St Patrick's Athletic, who he spent 5 seasons playing with. His former clubs also include Athlone Town, Kildare County, Shamrock Rovers, Derry City, Sporting Fingal, Bohemians.

== Club career ==
=== Early career ===
Ger O'Brien was signed by Eric Hannigan before the start of the 2004 season from Athlone Town. He was the first player to represent the Republic of Ireland at any level while playing with Kildare County. He represented the Eircom League International squad in Aberdeen for the quadrangular tournament with England, Scotland and Wales in 2004. Ger O' Brien made 39 appearances for Kildare County in the 2005 season and was also awarded the club's player of the season award.

=== Shamrock Rovers ===
Ger left Kildare County for Shamrock Rovers to become one of the country's best full backs. He missed most of the pre-season campaign in his first year with Shamrock Rovers but once the season began he became a first team regular pretty quickly. He revealed himself to be a tough and uncompromising defender and although he suffered an injury setback in early June he made a quick recovery and picked up where he left off. On 11 November 2007 Ger was voted Shamrock Rovers Player of the Year for the 2007 season and on the 13th he also represented his country in an Under 23 international against Slovakia in Dalymount Park.

=== Derry City ===
Signed for Derry City on three-year full-time deal in February 2009. Played in Derry's four UEFA Europa League games in July and August 2009.

=== Sporting Fingal ===
Following Derry's financial struggles in 2009, he opted to join Sporting Fingal for the 2010 season. .

=== Bohemians ===
After Sporting Fingal ceased trading, O'Brien's contract was cancelled. On the 15, February 2011 Bohemians announced the signing of 9 players including O'Brien. He made his league debut for his new club against Bray Wanderers on 4 March at the Carlisle Grounds.

=== St Patrick's Athletic ===
O'Brien signed for the club he supported as a boy, St Patrick's Athletic for the 2012 season. He is the club's vice captain and he skippered the side against Cliftonville in the Setanta Cup due to the absence of captain Conor Kenna. O'Brien started the season off well and after eight league games the Saints defence earned five clean sheets and only conceded three goals. In the 2013–14 UEFA Europa League first qualifying round, O'Brien scored his first goal for the Saints on his 70th appearance when he scored the equaliser in the first leg against VMFD Žalgiris to make it 2–2 in the LFF Stadium in Vilnius, Lithuania.

== International career ==
O'Brien represented the Republic of Ireland U23s in the 2007–09 International Challenge Trophy, playing in all three games. He won his first cap against Slovakia on 13 November 2007 and then earned a second cap in May 2008 against Northern Ireland. He scored on his third appearance against Belgium. Ireland went on to lose the match 2–1.

== Post-playing career ==
O'Brien dipped his toe into coaching while still a player at St Patrick's Athletic. With Pat's teammate Brendan Clarke as his assistant, he coached NUI Maynooth to Collingwood Cup glory for the first time in their history in 2014 by defeating NUI Galway in the final.

In 2014, O'Brien was appointed as Academy Director for the schoolboys section at St Francis. The club won two All Ireland trophies in his time and 7 players were transferred to the UK.

In November 2016, O'Brien progressed to being appointed as Academy Director for the underage teams at St Patrick's Athletic, he would also take up the role of assistant manager of the first team while continuing to play. He remained in this role until August 2019 when manager Harry Kenny left the club, with O'Brien remaining Director of Football as new manager Stephen O'Donnell bringing his former teammate Pat Cregg as assistant manager.

Following Liam Buckley's resignation as manager of the St Patrick's Athletic first team in September 2018, O'Brien took over as interim manager for the club's final 5 games of the season.

Since taking over the role as Director of Coaching, St Patrick's Athletic have had unprecedented success at academy level. In 2019 the club won 6 trophies in total with doubles at U13 & U15s age groups respectively. Not only has success come in the form of trophies its also come with players representing Ireland across all underage levels. Over 25 players have been capped since O'Brien took the role.

In 2020 St Pats U19s won their 1st League Championship in 5 years. Four more Academy players signed their 1st professional contracts with the club whilst two Academy players made the move across to the UK to play with Celtic and Aston Villa respectively.

2020 also saw O'Brien graduate with the highest possible honour to complete his UEFA Pro Licence course.

It was announced on 31 January 2024, that O'Brien had been promoted from his role as Academy Director, to Director of Football for the entire club at St Patrick's Athletic.

Managerial record by team and tenure
Team	From	To	Record							
Team	From	To	G	W	D	L	GF	GA	GD	Win %
St Patrick's Athletic (interim)	24 September 2018	26 October 2018	5	2	2	1	11	3	+8	40.00

== Honours ==
=== Club ===
Shamrock Rovers

- League of Ireland First Division (1): 2006

St Patrick's Athletic

- League of Ireland Premier Division (1): 2013
- President's Cup (1): 2014
- Leinster Senior Cup (1): 2014
- FAI Cup (1): 2014
- League of Ireland Cup (2): 2015, 2016

Maynooth University (As manager)

- Collingwood Cup (1): 2014

=== Individual ===
- Kildare County Player of the Year (1): 2005
- Shamrock Rovers Player of the Year (1): 2007
- PFAI Team of the Year (2): 2012, 2013
- St Patrick's Athletic Goal of the Season (1):
  - 2013 (vs Cork City)

Sporting positions
Preceded by Conor Kenna	St Patrick's Athletic captain 2014–2016	Succeeded by Ian Bermingham

Sporting positions
Preceded by Stephen Bradley	St Patrick's Athletic vice-captain 2012–2013	Succeeded by Ian Bermingham
