= Stephen O'Flynn =

Irish footballer

Personal information
- Full name: Stephen O'Flynn
- Date of birth: 27 April 1982 (age 44)
- Place of birth: Mallow, County Cork, Ireland
- Position: Forward

Youth career
- Mallow United
- 1998–2001: Wimbledon

Senior career*
Years	Team	Apps	(Gls)
2001–2002	Cork City	7	(1)
2002–2003	Limerick	58	(28)
2004	Cork City	1	(0)
2005–2006	Derry City	47	(9)
2007–2008	Galway United	29	(7)
2009	Limerick	13	(14)
2010	Northampton Town	5	(0)
2010–2011	Limerick	26	(12)
2012	St Patrick's Athletic	6	(1)
2014–2015	Institute	31	(18)
2015–2016	Crusaders	18	(3)
2016	→ Ballinamallard United (loan)	11	(3)
2016–2017	Glentoran	15	(2)
2017–2018	Donegal Celtic	9	(1)
2018	→ Ballinamallard United (loan)	9	(2)
Total		285	(101)

International career
1999	Republic of Ireland U17	2	(0)
- * Club domestic league appearances and goals

Stephen O'Flynn (born 27 April 1982) is an Irish retired footballer who played as a striker.

== Career ==
=== League of Ireland ===
O'Flynn was capped for Ireland at under-age levels. He also had spells at Cork City and Limerick when he was younger where he was very impressive at the latter. He then re signed for Cork City in 2004 and played alongside Kevin Doyle, however he was sidelined for most of the season through injury.

Following the injury, Stephen signed for Stephen Kenny's Derry City in 2005. The move reignited his career and he weighed in with several goals for Derry City including a winner against IFK Göteborg in the 2006–07 UEFA Cup in August 2006. However, when Pat Fenlon took over at Derry, he was released by the club on 14 December 2006 after 9 goals in 48 appearances.

He was signed by Galway United in preparation for their 2007 season. He was released by United in July 2008. In the same month, he returned to Limerick until the end of the 2009 season after having another injury hit season at Galway. There, O'Flynn made an impact on his return to League of Ireland football in the First Division scoring 14 goals in just 13 appearances. At the end of the 2009 season, O'Flynn made the Division One team of the year.

=== English football ===
When he was younger, he spent a period of time at Wimbledon before he moved to Irish football. In January 2010, he held talks with English League Two Side Northampton Town, after an impressive two-week trial. On 5 January, O'Flynn signed a contract with the Cobblers until the end of the 2009–10 season. He was released by the club on 12 May 2010 along with five other players.

=== Return to the League of Ireland ===
O'Flynn returned to Limerick in the mid-season transfer window on 21 June 2010.

O'Flynn spoke of his delight on returning to the club he regards as home saying,

I'm just delighted to be back. I was out of football for a year with injury when Pat Scully gave me a chance last year. I did well enough to earn a contract in England. Some of the players here were inexperienced last year but have come a long way in the last 12 months, I've been around a few years now and the set up here, on and off the pitch is absolutely top-class, Pat O'Sullivan can take a lot of credit for that, what he's doing for soccer in Limerick is unbelievable. We're 16 years stuck in this Division and it's time we got back where we belong, rugby and Gaelic have taken over in terms of support in Limerick and it's time we changed that.

=== St Patrick's Athletic ===
O'Flynn announced on his Twitter account that he had signed for Premier Division side St.Patrick's Athletic, in January 2012. O'Flynn started off life at the Inchicore club, scoring on his first start away to Dundalk in a 2–0 win.

O'Flynn again netted a crucial away goal against Íþróttabandalag Vestmannaeyja in the 2012–13 UEFA Europa League.

On Monday 25 February 2013, O'Flynn announced his retirement.

=== Institute ===
On 3 January 2014, he made his return to football, signing for (then NIFL Championship 1 club) Institute. He scored his first goal for the club on his debut in a 1–1 draw away to Coagh United on 11 January 2014. He won the Belfast Telegraph NIFL Championship 1 with the club in his first season, scoring 8 league goals in 10 games.

He opened his NIFL Premiership goalscoring account on the first day of the 2014/15 season; with both of his team's goals in a 2–2 draw away to Dungannon Swifts.

=== Crusaders ===
In December 2014 it was announced he would join Crusaders in January 2015. He made his debut as a substitute on 3 January against Ballinamallard United, before scoring his first goal in the next game, a 6-0 Irish Cup victory over Newington. O'Flynn was found frustrated by his lack of first team action in the 2015–2016 season and had a transfer request accepted in January.

=== Ballinamallard United ===
On Monday 25 January 2016 O'Flynn joined Ballinamallard United in a loan deal until the end of the season.

=== Glentoran ===
O'Flynn joined Glentoran on a pre contract agreement ahead of the 2016–17 NIFL Premiership season.

=== Donegal Celtic ===
Following his release by Glentoran at the end of the 2016–17 season, O'Flynn joined west Belfast club Donegal Celtic on a free transfer. On 1 January, O'Flynn rejoined former club Ballinamallard United on loan until the end of the season.

== Honours ==
Institute

- NIFL Championship 1 (1): 2013/14

Crusaders

- NIFL Premiership (1): 2014–15
