= Republic of Ireland national under-23 football team =

National association football team

Republic of Ireland Under-23
- Association: Football Association of Ireland
- Head coach: Jim Crawford
First colours	Second colours	Third colours

First international
- Republic of Ireland Under-23 0-0 France U-23 , (Dublin, Ireland; 5 June 1966)

The Republic of Ireland's national under-23 football team is the national under-23 football team of the Republic of Ireland. The Football Association of Ireland organises it.

The current Republic of Ireland Under-23 team is restricted to home-based players and is effectively a League of Ireland XI. It has represented the Republic of Ireland in the International Challenge Trophy since 2007.

== Matches ==
=== Friendlies ===
5 June 1966

Republic of Ireland U-23	0–0	France U-23
	(Report)

Dublin, Ireland

14 November 1972

France U-23	0–0	Republic of Ireland U-23
	(Report)

Lorient, France

20 May 1973

Republic of Ireland U-23	0–0	France U-23
	(Report)

Dublin, Ireland

11 April 1989

Republic of Ireland U-23	3–0	Northern Ireland U-23
Mick McCarthy; Denis Irwin; John Sheridan (pen)	(Report)

Dalymount Park, Dublin, Ireland

15 May 1990

Northern Ireland U-23	2–3	Republic of Ireland U-23
Stephen McBride; John Devine	(Report)	Niall Quinn; David Kelly (2, 1 pen)

Shamrock Park, Portadown, Northern Ireland

18 May 2010

Republic of Ireland	1–0	Republic of Ireland U-23
22 Anthony Stokes	(Report)

Gannon Park, Dublin, Ireland

=== 2007-09 International Challenge Trophy ===
13 November 2007

Republic of Ireland U-23	2–0	Slovakia U-23
26 Gavin Peers; 33 Killian Brennan	((Report)]

Dalymount Park, Dublin, Ireland
Referee: Richie Winter

13 May 2008

Northern Ireland U-23	0–1	Republic of Ireland U-23
	(Report)	88 Stephen Rice

Mourneview Park, Lurgan, Northern Ireland
Referee: Adrian McCourt (Northern Ireland)

21 October 2008

Republic of Ireland U-23	1–2	Belgium U-23
80 Ger O'Brien	(Report)	64 Jelle Vossen; 93 David Hubert

Dalymount Park, Dublin, Ireland
Referee: Neil Doyle (Ireland)

=== 2009-11 International Challenge Trophy ===
26 May 2010

Republic of Ireland U-23	1–2	England C
Paddy Madden 67'	(Report)	Andrew Fleming 27'; Max Porter 63'

Waterford Regional Sports Centre, Ireland
Referee: Alan Kelly (Ireland)

28 September 2010

Estonia U-23	0–1	Republic of Ireland U-23
	(Report)	42 Shaun Williams

Tallinn, Estonia
Referee: Eiko Saar (Estonia)
