= Aidan Price =

Irish footballer & coach (born 1981)

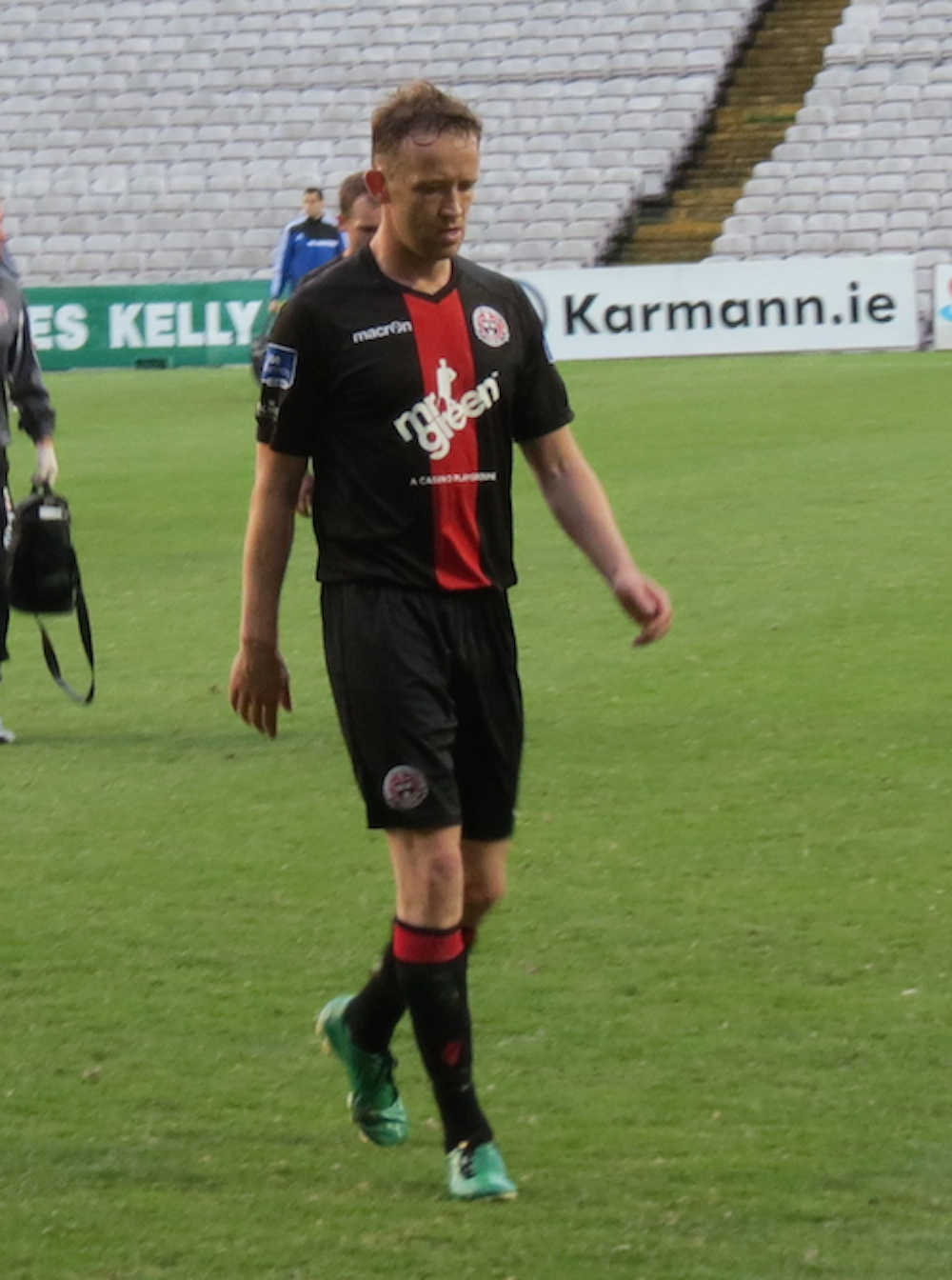
- Price playing for Bohemians

Personal information
- Date of birth: 8 December 1981 (age 44)
- Place of birth: Dublin, Ireland
- Height: 1.93 m (6 ft 4 in)
- Position: Centre back

Youth career
- Dublin Bus
- 2003–2005: Cherry Orchard

Senior career*
Years	Team	Apps	(Gls)
2005	Kilkenny City	35	(4)
2006–2010	Shamrock Rovers	119	(1)
2011	Bohemians	31	(0)
2012–2013	St Patrick's Athletic	12	(0)
2014	Bohemians	30	(1)
2015	Limerick	15	(0)

International career^{‡}
2011	League of Ireland XI	2	(0)

Managerial career
- 2020: Shamrock Rovers II
- * Club domestic league appearances and goals as of 22 February 2021 ‡ National team caps and goals as of 10 September 2012

Aidan Price (born 8 December 1981) is a former Irish football player, who was most recently the head coach of Shamrock Rovers II.

== Playing career ==
Price played for Kilkenny City until the start of 2006 when he switched to Shamrock Rovers. He scored his first goal for the club on 7 June 2008 against Sligo Rovers and scored his first league goal in July 2009 against the same opposition. He spent five seasons with the club, winning promotion in his first and the League of Ireland title in his last. He scored two goals in 148 total appearances which included four in the 2010–11 UEFA Europa League.

After spending time on trial at Derry City, Price signed for Bohemians just in time for the 2011 season. He made his league debut for his new club against Bray Wanderers on 4 March at the Carlisle Grounds.

Price signed for Dublin rivals St Patrick's Athletic for the 2012 season after a season with Bohemians. He missed all of pre-season while recovering from a foot operation, following an injury sustained in his last game for Bohemians, away to Derry City, and was not fit again until May. Price played his first game for St Patrick's Athletic on 7 May against his former club Shamrock Rovers in the Leinster Senior Cup quarter-final at Tallaght Stadium. St Patrick's Athletic, fielding a team made up mostly of under-19 players, lost 3–0. His next game was also against Shamrock Rovers, in the EA Sports Cup quarter-final at Richmond Park on 26 June. He played alongside several of the team's regular starters and was substituted after 78 minutes.

On 27 November it was confirmed that Price will return to Bohemians for the 2014 season.

== Managerial career ==
=== Shamrock Rovers II ===
In January 2020, he was appointed manager of Shamrock Rovers II, the reserve team of Shamrock Rovers that would be entering that seasons League of Ireland First Division. He guided the team to an 8th-place finish that season.

On 20 February 2021 it was announced that Shamrock Rovers II would not participate in the 2021 League of Ireland First Division, as the Football Association of Ireland opted to replace the team with newly formed Limerick club Treaty United.

== Honours ==
=== Club ===
Shamrock Rovers

- League of Ireland Premier Division (1): 2010
- League of Ireland First Division (1): 2006

St Patrick's Athletic

- League of Ireland Premier Division (1): 2013

=== Individual ===
- Shamrock Rovers Player of the Year (1): 2006

== Managerial statistics ==
As of match played 27 October 2020

Managerial record by team and tenure
Team	Nat.	From	To	Record							
Team	Nat.	From	To	G	W	D	L	GF	GA	GD	Win %
Shamrock Rovers II	(Republic of Ireland)	21 February 2020	27 October 2020	18	4	3	11	22	28	−6	22.22
Total				18	4	3	11	22	28	−6	22.22
