= John Russell (Irish footballer) =

Irish footballer & coach (born 1985)

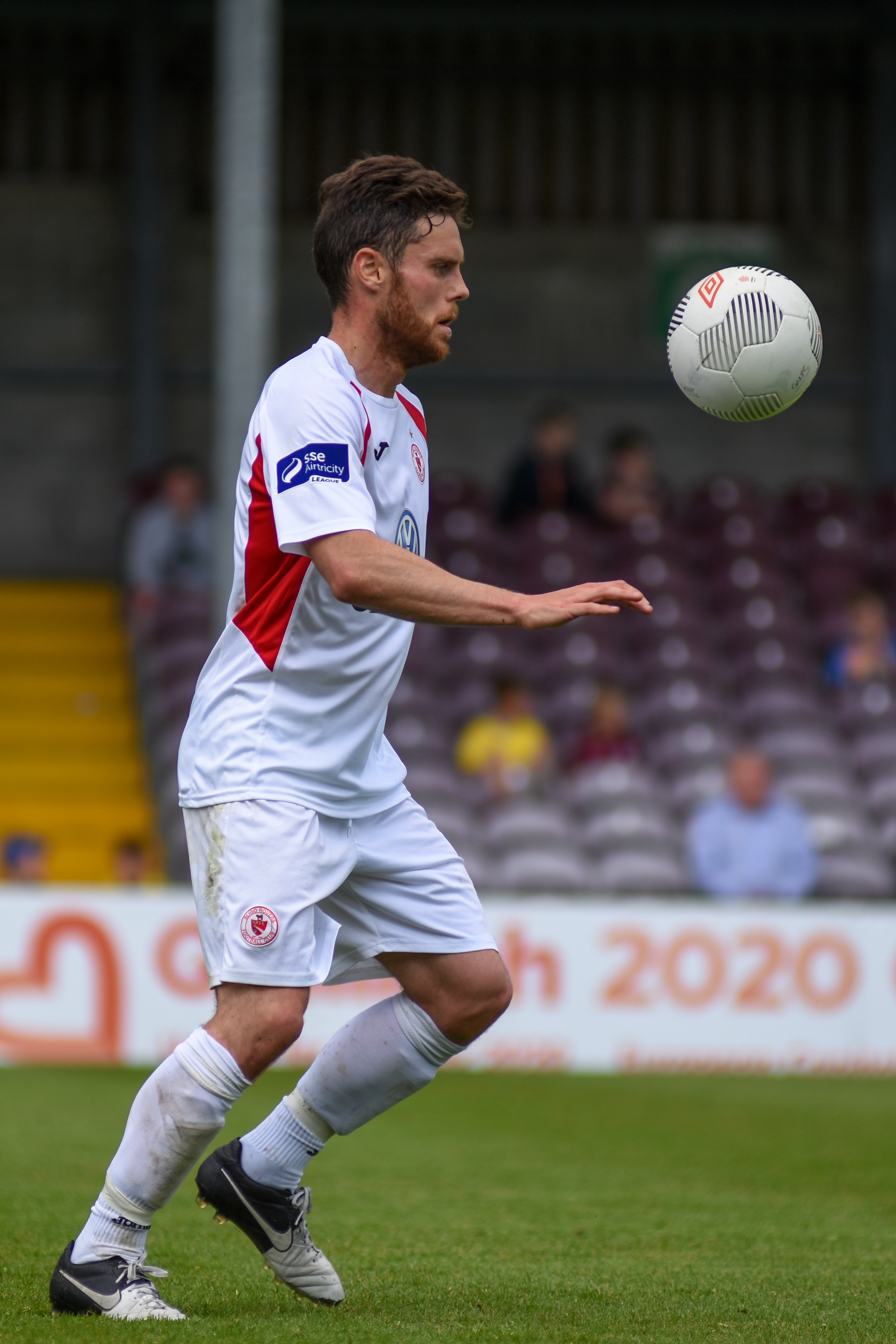
- Russell in 2016

Personal information
- Date of birth: 18 May 1985 (age 41)
- Place of birth: Galway, Ireland
- Position: Midfielder

Team information
- Current team: Shelbourne (manager)

Youth career
- Salthill Devon

Senior career*
Years	Team	Apps	(Gls)
2003–2009	Galway United	118	(9)
2010–2011	Sligo Rovers	54	(7)
2012–2013	St Patrick's Athletic	47	(6)
2014–2017	Sligo Rovers	64	(7)
2018	Westport United	1	(0)
2019–2021	Sligo Rovers	12	(0)

International career
- Republic of Ireland U19
2011	League of Ireland XI	1	(0)

Managerial career
- 2018: Westport United
- 2019–2022: Sligo Rovers (assistant manager)
- 2022–2026: Sligo Rovers
- 2026–: Shelbourne
- * Club domestic league appearances and goals as of 10:55, 13 July 2026 (UTC)

John Russell (born 18 May 1985) is an Irish former professional footballer and current manager of Shelbourne in the League of Ireland Premier Division.

== Personal life ==
Russell's sister Julie-Ann played for Galway W.F.C. and Ireland. He formerly worked as an FAI Development Officer for Sligo.

== Club career ==
=== Galway United ===
Russell started his League of Ireland football career with Galway United where he spent his first seasons as a player but in 2006 he left the club after three seasons at Terryland Park.
Russell re-signed for Galway United for the 2007 season and he spent a further three seasons at the club.

=== Sligo Rovers ===
For the 2010 season Russell signed for Sligo Rovers. He became an important part of the Sligo's side, becoming one of the most impressive performers of the 2010 campaign. Russell started the 2010 FAI Cup final against Shamrock Rovers. The game finished 0–0 (AET) but Sligo won the final on penalties. In total in his first season at Sligo he made twenty league appearances scoring three times. Russell signed back again for the 2011 season where he made thirty-four appearances scoring four times for The Bit O'Red. Russell started the 2011 FAI Cup final against Shelbourne. The game finished 1–1 (AET) but Sligo won the cup again on penalties for the second year in a row.

Russell left Sligo Rovers shortly after. In 2014, Russell re-signed with Sligo Rovers. In 2019, he returned as a player/coach.

=== St Patrick's Athletic ===
On 20 January 2012, Russell signed for Dublin side St Patrick's Athletic and was giving the number 18 jersey. Buckley spoke to stpatsfc.com about the signing the Galway native:"John is a very exciting, attacking player who will fit in with the way we will play this season. He has been excellent for Sligo over the past two seasons and we're delighted to get him on board". He hit the post and was later sent off after a questionable decision against Cliftonville in the Setanta Cup Russell started the season off well, scoring away to Dundalk at Oriel Park, scoring the second goal in the 5–1 thumping of rivals Shamrock Rovers and setting up Chris Fagan to make it 4–1 in the same game. Russell picked up the RTÉ Man of the Match award for his superb assist of Sean O'Connor's goal and an excellent energetic performance away to his old club Sligo Rovers. Russell missed a penalty in a Europa League game against NK Široki Brijeg from Bosnia and Herzegovina at the Stadion Pecara, but just two minutes later he set up Chris Fagan to open the scoring. Fagan returned the favour in the second leg when he set Russell up to open the scoring in a 2–1 after extra-time to earn a tie with German club Hannover 96.

== International career ==
Russell has been capped at u19 level for the Republic of Ireland national under-19 football team.

== Coaching career ==
In March 2018, Russell was appointed as Westport United manager for the 2018 season of the Mayo Super League.

In December 2018, it was announced that Russell would be returning to The Showgrounds and Sligo Rovers in a player-coach capacity. He would be assistant manager to Liam Buckley as well as being a registered player.

On 22 May 2022, it was announced that Liam Buckley would depart the club, with Russell stepping in as interim manager. On 2 June 2022, he was named as manager of the club on a permanent basis. On 12 July 2026, Sligo Rovers accepted Shelbourne's request to speak to Russell about their open managerial position, a day after Sligo suffered a 3–2 defeat away to Connaught rivals Galway United, a result that kept them rooted to the bottom of the league table.

On 13 July 2026, Russell was announced as manager of Shelbourne on a long-term contract. On 17 July 2026, he got off to a disastrous start to his new role, as his side were knocked out of the FAI Cup at the first hurdle following a defeat on penalties to League of Ireland First Division side Kerry.

== Managerial statistics ==
As of match played on 30 October 2026

Managerial record by team and tenure
Team	From	To	Record							
Team	From	To	G	W	D	L	GF	GA	GD	Win %
Sligo Rovers	22 May 2022	13 July 2026	165	56	34	75	186	235	−49	33.94
Shelbourne	13 July 2026	Present	17	5	4	8	31	27	+4	29.41
Total			182	61	38	83	214	261	−47	33.52

== Honours ==
Sligo Rovers

- FAI Cup: 2010, 2011
- League of Ireland Cup : 2010
- Setanta Sports Cup: 2014

St Patrick's Athletic

- League of Ireland Premier Division: 2013
