= Pat Flynn (footballer) =

Irish retired footballer

Patrick Bocko Flynn
Personal information
- Full name: Patrick Flynn
- Date of birth: 13 January 1985 (age 41)
- Place of birth: Dublin, Ireland
- Height: 1.80 m (5 ft 11 in)
- Position: Right back

Senior career*
Years	Team	Apps	(Gls)
2003–2005	Wolverhampton Wanderers	0	(0)
2005	Torquay United	1	(0)
2005–2006	Kidderminster Harriers	6	(0)
2006–2007	Waterford United	54	(0)
2008–2011	Shamrock Rovers	56	(0)
2012	St Patrick's Athletic	13	(1)
2013	Shelbourne	29	(0)
2014–2016	Longford Town	58	(2)
- * Club domestic league appearances and goals

Patrick Flynn (born 13 January 1985 in Dublin) is an Irish retired footballer.

== Career ==
Flynn made his League of Ireland debut for Waterford United at St Patrick's Athletic on 10 March 2006. After 2 seasons at the Regional Sports Centre, he signed for Shamrock Rovers in December 2007.

Flynn made his Rovers debut on the opening day of the 2008 season. He marked Cristiano Ronaldo on his debut for Real Madrid against Rovers in 2009. He has represented his country at U15 to U19 level and has won a youth Olympic gold medal, with the Ireland U16 squad at the Youth Olympics in Murcia in 2001. He signed a one-year contract extension with Shamrock Rovers in January 2011.

Flynn signed a one-year deal with St.Patrick's Athletic for the 2012 season. Flynn scored his first goal of his career for Pats in July against his old club Shamrock Rovers at Tallaght Stadium, in a 1–1 draw.

After spending the 2013 season at Shelbourne, Flynn signed for Longford Town in December 2013 ahead of the 2014 season. His debut season with the 'De Town' proved successful as he helped the Midlands side achieve promotion as champions of the First Division.

Flynn retired from League of Ireland football in October 2016. His final appearance was in Longford's 4–2 home defeat to his former club Shamrock Rovers.

== Honours ==
Shamrock Rovers

- League of Ireland Premier Division (2): 2010, 2011
- Setanta Sports Cup (1): 2011

Longford Town

- League of Ireland First Division (1): 2014
