= Louth Derby =

Football rivalry between Drogheda United and Dundalk FC

- Location: County Louth, Ireland
- Teams: Drogheda United; Dundalk FC
- First meeting: Dundalk 4–3 Drogheda United (16 August 1963); Dublin City Cup
- Latest meeting: Drogheda United 2–3 Dundalk (28 August 2026); League of Ireland Premier Division
- Next meeting: Drogheda United vs Dundalk (TBD); Jim Malone Cup
- Broadcasters: RTÉ, LOITV
- Stadiums: Sullivan & Lambe Park (Drogheda United); Oriel Park (Dundalk)

Statistics
- Total meetings: 216
- Most wins: Dundalk (110)
- Most player appearances: Ryan Brennan and Peter Cherrie (31)
- Top scorer: David McMillan (11)
- Largest victory: Dundalk 7–0 Drogheda United (20 May 2014); League of Ireland Premier Division
- Largest goal scoring: Drogheda United 2–7 Dundalk (19 September 1982); League of Ireland Cup
- Longest win streak: 16 games Dundalk (2015–2021)
- Longest unbeaten streak: 18 games Dundalk (2014–2021)

The Louth derby is the name given to an association football derby match played between Drogheda United and Dundalk FC. Outside of counties Cork and Dublin, County Louth is the only county in Ireland that has two elite football teams in the League of Ireland. While the clubs were formed in 1903 and 1919 respectively, the derby only commenced in 1963, when Drogheda entered the league, and has been contested over 200 times in all competitions.

== History ==
=== Origins ===
The derby has existed since the 1960s, when Drogheda United were inducted into the League of Ireland for the first time. A rivalry was born through several factors, including the close proximity of the clubs; Dundalk's Oriel Park lies 31 km from Drogheda's Weavers Park. Outside of football, as the two largest towns in County Louth, the towns have also had something of a "sibling rivalry" over the years.

Despite the rivalry, there is also a healthy respect between the two clubs, and a number of players have played for both teams over the years.

Overall, the Louth Derby is one of the most longstanding rivalries in Irish football, along with that of Bohemians and Shamrock Rovers.

=== Derby history ===
The first ever Louth Derby was played when Drogheda United were known as "Drogheda FC" back in 1963, in the first round of the now defunct Dublin City Cup, at Oriel Park on 16 August 1963. The game finished 4-3 to the home team, although Drogheda looked the more likely to pull off a shock result in their maiden outing before a goal from Dermot Cross in the 87th minute saw Dundalk through to the next round. Three months later, Dundalk hammered Drogheda 6-1 at Lourdes Stadium in the first league meeting between the neighbouring clubs, but around a year onwards, on 22 November 1964, Drogheda sought revenge and recorded their first ever win against Dundalk with a 3-1 victory at Oriel Park.

In 1966, Drogheda United and Dundalk organised the first of a series of annual friendly matches, known as the Donegan Cup. The first of these was a two-legged encounter which Dundalk won 5-2 on aggregate. The fixture became an on-and-off event until 1984, when the teams began struggling to choose a date due to hectic fixture lists.

During the 1971/72 season, Drogheda United made it to the final of the League of Ireland Shield, where they faced their county rivals but lost 5-0. To date, this remains the only time that Dundalk and Drogheda have competed in the final of a major competition.

Dundalk had periods of success in the mid-to-late 1970s, winning the league in both 1975/76 and 1978/79, but Drogheda adjusted well to life in the League of Ireland, recording a number of wins against them, including a 1-0 away win against the reigning champions in 1977. In fact, Drogheda went unbeaten in Louth derbies in the league for three years, and on 4 February 1979, Drogheda won the last Louth derby at Lourdes Stadium 1-0, before moving to United Park later that year. Dundalk ended this run by winning 2-0 in the first derby held at United Park.

The longest unbeaten period in the fixture was enjoyed by Dundalk, when they failed to lose in 23 in all competitions for over 9 years between 4 December 1983 and 5 August 1993, a period in which they won five major trophies, including two league titles and an FAI Cup. The streak was ended by Drogheda who won 1-0 at Oriel Park on 26 August 1993.

At the end of the 1993/94 season, Drogheda were relegated to the First Division, meaning the derby was not contested until 1995/96, when they came back up again as runners up and beat reigning champions Dundalk twice; a 3-2 on 20 October 1995, and a 2-1 on 14 April 1996, as well as drawing 2-2 at Oriel Park on 21 January 1996. Despite this, they were relegated again, but were promoted straight after the 1996/97 season to beat Dundalk home and away on 23 January and 16 April 1998. Drogheda finished last and went down for a third time, but won the 1998/99 First Division. This time, Dundalk had been relegated, and the derby wasn't played again until 2000/01, when Drogheda found themselves back in the First Division, this time accompanied by their Louth rivals, who beat them four times and were promoted as champions. Drogheda were back in the Premier Division a year later, and that is where they stayed for the next 14 years, but Dundalk slumped back down, meaning the Louth Derby was not played as a league fixture until Dundalk were promoted at the end of 2008.

In 1997, the annual pre season friendly between the clubs was revived in honour of Dundalk stalwart Jim Malone, who died in 1996. On 5 October that year, Drogheda won the inaugural match, beating Dundalk 4-2 on penalties after a 2-2 draw at Oriel Park. Dundalk got their first Malone Cup victory three years later, on 5 July 2000, with a 3-0 away win.

Drogheda played against Dundalk a number of times throughout the 2000s in domestic cups. On 30 July 2004, they defeated them 3-2 in an 2004 FAI Cup round 2 replay, when a late Dundalk flurry of goals from Simon Kelly and Steven Napier wasn't enough to cancel out a brace from John Lester and a goal from Declan O'Brien. A year later, they won 2-0 in round 3 at Oriel Park, Mark Leech and Damian Lynch scoring for Drogheda, who went on to beat Cork City 2-0 in the 2005 final and lift the FAI Cup for the first time, the first of 4 trophies during Drogheda's "golden era".

In the pre-season of 2009, Declan O'Brien moved between the clubs on a free transfer, and was met with a hostile reception by the home supporters at United Park when he lined out for Dundalk in the Jim Malone Cup match on 24 February. He was branded a traitor, subjected to banners reading "Judas", and a pigs head was thrown onto the pitch, inspired by the infamous incident involving Luís Figo at the Camp Nou in 2002. Drogheda went on to win the game 4-3 on penalties after a scoreless draw, with O'Brien missing his spot kick. He went on to rejoin Drogheda ahead of the 2012 season and helped them win the 2012 League Cup.

The first league meeting for almost eight years was on 20 March in the 2009 season, when Dundalk won 3-0 at Oriel Park courtesy of a brace of penalties from Chris Turner and a goal from Darren Mansaram. Drogheda, who were suffering from financial difficulties, fell to a 4-2 defeat later that year when Alex Williams scored twice in between goals from Ger Rowe and Chris Turner. Drogheda failed to win another league derby until 10 June 2011 when Dinny Corcoran and Philip Hand helped them to a 2-1 win despite Daniel Kearns striking back in the 86th minute. That same year, Dundalk found their first cup win against Drogheda since 2003, when a goal from Keith Ward and another from Mark Quigley five minutes later secured their place in the fifth round of the 2011 FAI Cup.

In the 2012 League of Ireland Premier Division, Drogheda produced a significant comeback at United Park on 31 August 2012. Dundalk looked on course for a surprise victory, going 2-0 up inside 31 minutes thanks to Mark Griffin, but their lead slipped away when Peter Hynes scored after half an hour, and grabbed the equaliser in the 87th minute. Drogheda ultimately grabbed all three points in injury time when John Sullivan scored the winner. On 6 October 2013, they made it to the 2013 FAI Cup Final once again when they controversially beat Dundalk 1-0 in front of 2,000 people at United Park, a game dubbed "The biggest Louth Derby in history" by the Dundalk Democrat. Their biggest ever derby victory came on opening day of the 2014 campaign, Declan O'Brien netting a brace after goals from Eric Foley and Gavin Brennan proved enough to stifle Dundalk, who struck through Patrick Hoban, and win 4-1 on 7 March. The game also saw three red cards, for Philip Hughes, Gavin Brennan, and Simon Kelly. Despite opening day defeat, Dundalk went on to beat Drogheda 7-0 at Oriel on 20 May, their largest victory over them, and win the league title for the first time in 19 years.

Dundalk saw their most successful period under Stephen Kenny between 2013 and 2018, and didn't taste derby defeat at all between 2014 and 2021, a period in which they won eleven major trophies. On 18 September 2015, they comfortable beat Drogheda 6-0 at Oriel Park, four goals from Richie Towell and strikes from Daryl Horgan and David McMillan all but condemning them to relegation whilst Dundalk retained the title. They repeated this two years later, on 16 June 2017, after Drogheda had been promoted through the playoffs in 2016. Braces from David McMillan and Ciarán Kilduff, alongside goals from Patrick McEleney and Michael Duffy, were met with no response from the home team who saw Thomas Byrne sent off during the game. Drogheda United were relegated at the end of the 2017 season, and remained in the First Division until they won it in 2020. In this time, Dundalk had won two league titles, two FAI Cups, one League Cup and played in the Europa League group stages.

In 2021, the first competitive Louth derby in four years, and the first ever behind closed doors due to the COVID-19 pandemic, was played at Oriel Park, a 2-1 victory for the hosts in which David McMillan, Han Jeong-Woo and Chris Lyons were on the scoresheet. On 20 August, Drogheda recorded a significant win at Oriel Park when a brace from Mark Doyle helped them to a 2-1 victory, their first away win in Dundalk for just under a decade and ending Dundalk's unbeaten record in the fixture dating back to 2014. The result was a blow for Dundalk, who were already suffering their worst season in 9 years, and it looked possible that newly promoted Drogheda would finish above them in the league, something that had not occurred since 2012. With Dundalk in seventh place and Drogheda in sixth place, the sides faced off on 4 November at United Park. The game looked headed towards a 0-0 draw, until Daniel Cleary bundled the ball over the line to win the game in the 86th minute and secure Dundalk's safety from relegation.

On 11 February 2022, goals from James Clarke and Chris Lyons saw Drogheda win the Jim Malone Cup with a 2-1 victory at Oriel Park, ending a seven year streak of Dundalk dominance. On 18 March, they repeated the feat in the first competitive derby of the season, when a Dean Williams penalty led them to a 1-0 win at United Park, their first home victory against Dundalk in 8 years. This result condemned Dundalk to their first loss of the season. Despite suffering a heavy 4-1 loss at Oriel Park in April, courtesy of a brace from Darragh Leahy, and goals from Patrick Hoban and John Martin, Drogheda recorded another win against Dundalk on 8 July when Dean Williams was the hero again. He scored just 52 seconds into the game, making it one of the quickest goals in League of Ireland history. Dundalk's win at Oriel in the last derby of 2022 thanks to a Runar Hauge penalty and a Dane Massey own goal meant both sides recorded two derby wins each over the course of the season.

In 2023, Dundalk managed a clean sweep over Drogheda, the first time in history that either team had won four derbies in a single league season. On 16 March, Connor Malley's goal proved to decisive in a 1-0 win at United Park, with Drogheda being denied a late equaliser when Freddie Draper's penalty was saved by Nathan Shepperd. On 29 April, the sides faced again at Oriel Park in a 3-2 win for Dundalk. The visitors trailed by two goals from Ryan O'Kane and Patrick Hoban at half time, but despite losing captain Gary Deegan to a second yellow card just after the interval, they were able to fight back to level the game through Dayle Rooney and Freddie Draper. However, Drogheda had a valuable point stolen at the death when John Martin snatched the winner in the 95th minute.

On 23 June, Dundalk beat Drogheda 2-1 at United Park. Adam Foley opened the scoring for Drogheda before Patrick Hoban scored his 143rd goal for Dundalk to equalise, becoming the club's all-time record goal scorer, breaking Jimmy Hasty's long-standing record of 142. The away team were then given a penalty in the 81st minute, and Hoban stepped up to make sure they took home all the points.

On 29 September, Kyle Robinson opened the scoring at Oriel Park for Drogheda, before goals from Paul Doyle, Daniel Kelly and Patrick Hoban confirmed a 3-1 win, and a fourth consecutive derby victory for the Dundalk.

2024 saw six competitive derbies take place, the most on record in a single year. On 3 February, Drogheda United came back from 1-0 down to secure a 2-1 away victory which sent them to the knockout stages of the Leinster Senior Cup. Teenager Warren Davis scored the decisive goals off the bench, including a last minute winner from the penalty spot.

On 1 April, the sides drew 0-0 in the first league meeting in Oriel Park. On 6 May, the sides found themselves occupying the bottom two spots on the table, leading to a relegation crunch match at Weavers Park. Frantz Pierrot struck first for the hosts before Jamie Gullan equalised from a free kick. Defender Hayden Cann then found himself free inside the box to steal all three points for the ten-man Drogs in the 93rd minute and cut Dundalk five points adrift at the bottom. Cann controversially signed for Dundalk less than two months later.

On 12 July, Dundalk were 4-2 victors in an important derby which saw them move five points ahead of their rivals at Oriel Park. Drogheda missed the opportunity to drag themselves off the bottom of the table, with goals from Jad Hakiki, Ryan O'Kane and a brace from Daryl Horgan outweighing a brace from Walsall loanee Douglas James-Taylor.

Seven days later, the Louth rivals met once again, this time at Weavers Park in the FAI Cup second round.

=== Successes ===
Dundalk are one of the most historically successful teams in Irish football history. They were the first team from Ireland to win an away game in Europe, and to date have won 49 major trophies, including fourteen league titles and twelve FAI Cups. Their most successful period came in the mid-2010s, under manager Stephen Kenny, when they won five league titles in six years, and made it to the FAI Cup final six consecutive seasons. Dundalk made history in 2016 and 2020 when they qualified for the group stages of the UEFA Europa League, becoming the first Irish team to compete in the competition on two occasions. Dundalk's successful period came whilst Drogheda were competing in the First Division, or struggling at the bottom of the Premier Division.

In comparison, Drogheda United's most successful period came in the mid-2000s, when Dundalk were in the First Division. They won the FAI Cup in 2005, two Setanta Sports Cups in 2006 and 2007, and their first League of Ireland title in 2007. They came close to European qualification four times; the UEFA Cup in 2006 and 2007, and the UEFA Champions League in 2008 and 2013.

The gulf in success between the two teams fuels the rivalry between the two teams. Drogheda only returned to the top flight ahead of the 2021 season, after a four-year stint in the First Division.

=== Club structures ===
Both teams have recovered from financial difficulties in the wake of the post-2008 Irish economic downturn. Dundalk were close to extinction in 2012, but were saved when a local consortium stabilised and took over the club. Drogheda survived examinership after a court ruling in 2008, on the basis that they remain a semi-professional outfit until in a financially comfortable position to switch to a full time set up. This has contributed to the gap between the teams, as Dundalk became a fully professional team in 2017.

Dundalk's ownership history has also contributed to the gulf between the sides in recent years. Dundalk have received financial backing from their owners since 2012, whereas Drogheda United were supporter-owned between 2008 and 2023, and funded on a much smaller scale by their fans. However, in 2023, American consortium Trivela Group finalised their plans to purchase Drogheda United which means the club is set to receive a larger playing budget heading into the next few seasons.

=== Supporters ===
The matches between Drogheda and Dundalk are known for their atmosphere and support from both sets of fans. The fanbases of both clubs are somewhat evenly spread across County Louth. Dundalk gain most of their following from the north of County Louth, as well as regions such as Armagh, Monaghan and Newry, whereas Drogheda's support comes from the south of the county, also stretching into parts of County Meath and north Dublin.

The fixture itself has historically provided a "fiery" atmosphere. The home sections usually sell out, and away fans travel in large numbers. The fixture has seen many red cards over the years, and occasionally has seen conflict between sets of spectators. Both teams have singing sections; Dundalk's "Shedside Army" and Drogheda's "Famous 45 Ultras". They direct derogatory chants at each other, poking fun at the other for living in an inferior town.

In early 2026, both clubs condemned the behaviour of fans, when several flares were thrown by Drogheda fans at a game in derby February 2026. A 12-year-old child was struck by one flare and sustained burns to his face. The artificial surface of the pitch was also damaged.

== Notable games ==
16 August 1963
Dublin City Cup 1st round
7.00pm

Dundalk	4-3	Drogheda United
F. Callan 25' (pen.); J. Hasty 42'; S. Pownell 67'; B. Kennedy 87'	Match Report	M. McElroy 15', 47'; T. Kerr 49'

Oriel Park, Dundalk
Attendance: 4,000

The first ever Louth Derby game occurred in the now defunct Dublin City Cup in the same year that Drogheda first entered the League of Ireland. Dundalk won in a 4-3 "thriller", scoring the winning goal in the 87th minute. 4,000 people were estimated to have been in attendance at Oriel Park.

18 January 1996
FAI Cup 1st round replay
7.45pm

Drogheda United	2-1 (AET)	Dundalk
T. Sullivan 80'; T. Croly 105'	Match Report	M. Byrne 46'

O2 Park, Drogheda
Attendance: 4,500

The largest Louth Derby crowd in history bore witness to an eventful encounter in the round 1 replay of the FAI Cup at O2 Park. After a 1-1 draw at Oriel the week before, Drogheda won 2-1. Mick Byrne scored the first point for Dundalk. In the second half, former Dundalk player Tom Sullivan scored for Drogheda, tying the match. Trevor Croly scored the winning point for Drogheda in extra time.

23 October 1997
League of Ireland Premier Division
7.45pm

Dundalk	1-1	Drogheda United
D. Crawley 85'	Match Report	B. Irwin 90+1'

Oriel Park, Dundalk
Attendance:

A grand-stand finish at Oriel Park in October 1997 set the tone for many future Louth Derbies to come. Honours were even in a scrappy contest, with Drogheda having the better share of chances, and the sending off of Dundalk's Peter Whitnell in the 75th minute made a win look likely. However, David Crawley's late attempted cross snuck inside the near post after goalkeeper Eddie van Boxtel fluffed his lines, and it looked as if the Lilywhites had snatched it. However, inside injury time, substitute Brian Irwin found himself in space and volleyed into the net to rescue a point for Drogheda.

25 August 2005
FAI Cup 3rd round
1.45pm

Dundalk	0-2	Drogheda United
	Match Report	M. Leech 42'; D. Lynch 53' (pen.)

Oriel Park, Dundalk
Attendance: 4,152

Drogheda took on their county rivals in the FAI Cup for the second year running, this time on the new artificial surface of Oriel Park, and walked away with a 2-0 victory. An late first half rally saw Mark Leech dispatch his header, followed up by a penalty minutes later by Damian Lynch that saw them advanced to the quarter-finals. This was a significant result as Drogheda went on to win the competition that year, beating Cork City 2-0 in the final at Lansdowne Road.

22 April 2011
League of Ireland Premier Division
7.45pm

Drogheda United	1-0	Dundalk
D. Corcoran 24'	Match Report	C. Hawkins 56'; D. Kearns 84'

Hunky Dorys Park, Drogheda
Attendance: 1,300
Referee: Alan Kelly

Dundalk came into the game in search of their first away points of the season, with Drogheda also in a poor run of form. Dinny Corcoran scored for the hosts completely against the run of play, but Dundalk managed to keep the game alive by clawing one back in the 56th minute through Colin Hawkins. The comeback was complete when Daniel Kearns' header in the 84th minute secured the win.

10 June 2011
League of Ireland Premier Division
7.45pm

Dundalk	1-2	Drogheda United
D. Kearns 86'	Match Report	D. Corcoran 24'; P. Hand 48'

Oriel Park, Dundalk
Attendance: 1,900
Referee: Tomas Connolly

The second of a whopping 6 Louth Derbies in 2011 saw Drogheda take the bragging rights from Oriel Park in June. Dinny Corcoran took the lead before a stunning free kick from Philip Hand found the top corner. Daniel Kearns repeated his feat of scoring a late derby goal, but it wasn't enough to keep Dundalk's 8 month unbeaten run to an end, and Drogheda recorded their first league win over Dundalk for over 13 years, spanning back to 1998.

30 August 2011
FAI Cup 4th round replay
7.45pm

Dundalk	2-1	Drogheda United
K. Ward 25'; M. Quigley 29'	Match Report	J. White 90'

Oriel Park, Dundalk
Attendance: 1,484
Referee: Damien Hancock

An FAI Cup 4th round replay was on the cards just 4 days after the sides played out a 1-1 draw in Drogheda. Keith Ward scored a stunning finesse shot which looped over the keeper from outside the box, before Mark Quigley doubled the lead. A late goal from Jordan White proved only a consolation, and Dundalk commenced into the next round of the cup.

25 June 2012
EA Sports Cup quarter final
7.45pm

Drogheda United	1-1	Dundalk
E. Foley 33'	Match Report	M. Griffin 54'
Penalties
E. Foley (penalty scored); R. Brennan (penalty scored); P. Hynes (penalty missed); D. Marshall (penalty missed); G. Brennan (penalty scored)	3-2	(penalty missed) J. Mountney; (penalty missed) S. O'Neill; (penalty scored) C. Shields; (penalty scored) P. Walsh; (penalty missed) M. Griffin

Hunky Dorys Park, Drogheda
Referee: Derek Tomney

A mouth watering League Cup quarter final was evenly contested at Hunky Dorys Park between the sides, with Eric Foley taking the lead for the hosts before Mark Griffin levelled affairs after half time. After 120 minutes of football, the teams could not be separated, and local boy Gavin Brennan was the hero as his winning penalty in the shootout sent Drogheda United to the semi-finals. They would go on to win the competition, beating Shamrock Rovers in the final.

31 August 2012
League of Ireland Premier Division
7.45pm

Drogheda United	3-2	Dundalk
P. Hynes 31', 87'; J. Sullivan 90'	Match Report	M. Griffin 5', 25'

Hunky Dorys Park, Drogheda
Attendance: 933
Referee: Anthony Buttimer

Drogheda United's first home league win over Dundalk since 1998 came in very dramatic fashion. The visitors looked good value for a win to end their bad run of form, with Mark Griffin netting two wonderful goals within the first half hour, but the Drogs kept pushing and got their rewards. A brace from Peter Hynes and a last minute winner from John Sullivan saw them snatch the three points in an unbelievable turn of events.

8 September 2013
League of Ireland Premier Division
6.00pm

Dundalk	1-0	Drogheda United
S. O'Donnell 88'	Match Report

Oriel Park, Dundalk
Attendance: 3,324
Referee: Alan Kelly

Dundalk's shock title race in 2013 was interesting viewing for neutrals, but Drogheda visited Oriel Park in September with the aim of extinguishing it. After an abundance of chances for both teams, it looked like it was going to end all square, but a defensive mistake from Alan McNally was pounced on by Dundalk captain Stephen O'Donnell, who slotted home to win the tie in dramatic fashion with just seconds remaining.

6 October 2013
FAI Cup semi final
1.45pm

Drogheda United	1-0	Dundalk
G. Brennan 31' (pen.)	Match Report

Hunky Dorys Park, Drogheda
Attendance: 2,000
Referee: Anthony Buttimer

An fiery classic between Drogheda and Dundalk, dubbed "the biggest Louth Derby in history" by the Dundalk Democrat, as they battled for a place in the FAI Cup final in a hostile encounter. Tensions boiled over when Darren Meehan was dismissed for a dangerous tackle just 26 minutes in, and Dundalk were reduced to 9 men just 5 minutes later when Chris Shields saw red for his challenge on Declan O'Brien inside the box. Gavin Brennan dispatched the resulting penalty kick, and inspired the Drogs to their first FAI Cup final in 8 years.

7 March 2014
League of Ireland Premier Division
7.45pm

Drogheda United	4-1	Dundalk
E. Foley 38'; G. Brennan 48'; D. O'Brien 53', 68'	Match Report	P. Hoban 65'

Hunky Dorys Park, Drogheda
Attendance: 2,007
Referee: Derek Tomney

To date, this match on the opening night of the 2014 season remains Drogheda United's largest ever victory over their county rivals. The hosts were impressive either side of the half time interval, with goals from Eric Foley, Gavin Brennan, and a brace from all time top goalscorer Declan O'Brien saw them smother Dundalk. Patrick Hoban netted a consolation just past the hour mark, and Brennan received a red card in the 86th minute for a late tackle on Stephen O'Donnell.

20 May 2014
League of Ireland Premier Division
7.45pm

Dundalk	7-0	Drogheda United
S. Gannon 29'; D. Horgan 51'; P. Crowley (O.G.) 62'; Andy Boyle 72'; David McMillan 74', 86'; Richie Towell 78'	Match Report

Oriel Park, Dundalk
Attendance: 2,383
Referee: Tomas Connolly

A game where Dundalk showed the peak of their powers, with five different players appearing on on the scoresheet. Drogheda United were humbled on a historic night for the hosts at Oriel Park. The Lilywhites went on to win the league title that year, the first of many to come under Stephen Kenny.

18 September 2015
League of Ireland Premier Division
7.25pm

Dundalk	6-0	Drogheda United
D. Horgan 28', R. Towell 49', 59' (pen.), 76', 90'; D. McMillan 73'	Match Report

Oriel Park, Dundalk
Attendance: 3,207
Referee: Rob Rogers

Drogheda United defense could not prevent 4 goals from Dundalk midfielder Richie Towell and lost the match. The season ended with Dundalk retaining the league title while Drogheda was demoted to the First Division.

16 June 2017
League of Ireland Premier Division
7.45pm

Drogheda United	0-6	Dundalk
	Match Report	D. McMillan 36', 41'; P. McEleney 44'; M. Duffy 59'; C. Kilduff 83', 85'

United Park, Drogheda
Attendance: 1,800
Referee: Derek Tomney

Dundalk's largest victory recorded at United Park, as Drogheda fell to a side widely regarded as the best in Irish football history. Braces from David McMillan and Ciaran Kilduff, either side of a goal of the season contender from Patrick McEleney gave Dundalk supporters a day out to remember, and put a stamp on things for the Drogs who were relegated again by the end of the campaign.

20 August 2021
League of Ireland Premier Division
7.45pm

Dundalk	1-2	Drogheda United
M. Duffy 60'	Match Report	M. Doyle 35', 58'

Oriel Park, Dundalk
Attendance: 600
Referee: Ben Connolly

Newly promoted Drogheda recording their first win over Dundalk since 2014, and their first win at Oriel Park since 2012, was a sign that the days of derby demolitions were over. Mark Doyle's brace came at a time when Dundalk were placed 8th in the table during their worst season since 2011. The win was a massive statement from Drogheda United and their supporters, who lost academy coach David Conroy just days before the fixture took place in front of a limited 600 home supporters and 0 of their away supporters due to the COVID-19 pandemic.

4 November 2021
League of Ireland Premier Division
7.45pm

Drogheda United	0-1	Dundalk
	Match Report	D. Cleary 86'

Head In The Game Park, Drogheda
Attendance: 1,861
Referee: Robert Harvey

The stakes were higher than ever on a cold November night in Drogheda, and this game could be considered one of the most closely contested Louth Derbies of recent history. With Dundalk still suffering from a horrendous campaign, Drogheda came into the game 2 points ahead their rivals with the chance to finish above them for the first time since 2012 by opening up a 5 point gap ahead of the last 2 games of the season. 0-0 for the majority of the game, up stepped centre back Daniel Cleary who managed to bundle the ball over the line and save Dundalk from shock relegation in the 86th minute. Dundalk went on to finish in 6th, above the Drogs by 4 points.

18 March 2022
League of Ireland Premier Division
7.45pm

Drogheda United	1-0	Dundalk
D. Williams 49' (pen.)	Match Report

Head In The Game Park, Drogheda
Attendance: 2,065
Referee: Robert Hennessy

Despite a level of confidence ahead of the game, Dundalk's bad record at United Park continued as Drogheda gave them their first defeat of the season. It was the first time the hosts had won a derby at home for 8 years. Youngster Dean Williams became a "cult hero" when he converted a penalty kick just after half time.

28 April 2023
League of Ireland Premier Division
19.45

Dundalk	3–2	Drogheda United
R. O'Kane 23'; P. Hoban 28'; J. Martin 90+1'	Match Report	D. Rooney 54'; F. Draper 72'

Oriel Park, Dundalk
Attendance: 2,825
Referee: Neil Doyle

Dundalk looked to be running away with the lead when Ryan O'Kane and Patrick Hoban scored within five minutes of each other in the first half, and it was beginning to look like one of those days for Drogheda when Gary Deegan received a second yellow card after the interval. Despite the setback, Dayle Rooney was able to spark a fight back, and Freddie Draper's equaliser looked certain to secure a giant result for the ten-man visitors. As injury time ticked on, up stepped John Martin to save Dundalk's woes and score in the 91st minute, securing "one of the most dramatic Louth derby victories in living memory" and breaking Drogs hearts.

6 May 2024
League of Ireland Premier Division
1.00pm

Drogheda United	2–1	Dundalk
F. Pierrot 55'; H. Cann 90+4'	Match Report	J. Gullan 78'

Weavers Park, Drogheda
Attendance: 2,339
Referee: Robert Harvey

A game dubbed the "most important Louth derby in over a decade", with both sides in the early stages of a relegation dogfight, Dundalk travelled to Weavers Park on a bank holiday Monday knowing a win would take them off the bottom of the table. Drogheda United, just two points ahead of them, were gifted a chance at the start of the second half which Frantz Pierrot dispatched. When the Drogheda goalkeeper Jethren Barr was sent off with 15 minutes to go, Jamie Gullan equalised from the resulting free kick and it appeared the momentum had switched to Dundalk. However, a free kick delivery from Evan Weir in the fourth minute of injury time found centre back Hayden Cann, who bundled the ball into the net securing a last gasp win for the ten-man hosts and a five point advantage on their derby rivals.

== All–time results ==
=== League results ===
As of 28 August 2026

Season	Date	Home team	Result	Away team	Stadium	Division	Round	Attendance
1963/64	24 November 1963	Drogheda	1 – 6	Dundalk	Lourdes Stadium	League of Ireland	Round 3	Unknown
1963/64	9 February 1964	Dundalk	6 – 2	Drogheda	Oriel Park	League of Ireland	Round 14	Unknown
1964/65	22 November 1964	Dundalk	1 – 3	Drogheda	Oriel Park	League of Ireland	Round 3	Unknown
1964/65	7 February 1965	Drogheda	0 – 1	Dundalk	Lourdes Stadium	League of Ireland	Round 14	Unknown
1965/66	21 November 1965	Drogheda	0 – 2	Dundalk	Lourdes Stadium	League of Ireland	Round 3	Unknown
1965/66	6 February 1966	Dundalk	4 – 0	Drogheda	Oriel Park	League of Ireland	Round 14	Unknown
1966/67	4 September 1966	Drogheda	1 – 4	Dundalk	Lourdes Stadium	League of Ireland	Round 1	Unknown
1966/67	20 November 1966	Dundalk	3 – 0	Drogheda	Oriel Park	League of Ireland	Round 3	Unknown
1966/67	5 February 1967	Drogheda	1 – 3	Dundalk	Lourdes Stadium	League of Ireland	Round 14	Unknown
1967/68	10 December 1967	Dundalk	3 – 2	Drogheda	Oriel Park	League of Ireland	Round 6	Unknown
1967/68	10 March 1968	Drogheda	1 – 0	Dundalk	Lourdes Stadium	League of Ireland	Round 17	Unknown
1968/69	8 December 1968	Drogheda	1 – 2	Dundalk	Lourdes Stadium	League of Ireland	Round 6	Unknown
1968/69	9 March 1969	Dundalk	0 – 1	Drogheda	Oriel Park	League of Ireland	Round 17	Unknown
1969/70	12 October 1969	Drogheda	0 – 1	Dundalk	Lourdes Stadium	League of Ireland	Round 2	Unknown
1969/70	11 January 1970	Dundalk	0 – 3	Drogheda	Oriel Park	League of Ireland	Round 15	Unknown
1970/71	11 October 1970	Dundalk	1 – 1	Drogheda	Oriel Park	League of Ireland	Round 2	Unknown
1970/71	10 January 1971	Drogheda	2 – 4	Dundalk	Lourdes Stadium	League of Ireland	Round 15	Unknown
1971/72	10 October 1971	Dundalk	0 – 3	Drogheda	Oriel Park	League of Ireland	Round 2	Unknown
1971/72	9 January 1972	Drogheda	0 – 1	Dundalk	Lourdes Stadium	League of Ireland	Round 15	Unknown
1972/73	13 October 1972	Dundalk	1 – 1	Drogheda	Oriel Park	League of Ireland	Round 2	Unknown
1972/73	14 January 1973	Drogheda	2 – 2	Dundalk	Lourdes Stadium	League of Ireland	Round 15	Unknown
1973/74	9 December 1973	Drogheda	3 – 1	Dundalk	Lourdes Stadium	League of Ireland	Round 10	Unknown
1973/74	23 March 1974	Dundalk	3 – 0	Drogheda	Oriel Park	League of Ireland	Round 23	Unknown
1974/75	8 December 1974	Dundalk	1 – 1	Drogheda	Oriel Park	League of Ireland	Round 10	Unknown
1974/75	23 March 1975	Drogheda	0 – 0	Dundalk	Lourdes Stadium	League of Ireland	Round 23	Unknown
1975/76	7 December 1975	Drogheda United	1 – 2	Dundalk	Lourdes Stadium	League of Ireland	Round 10	Unknown
1975/76	21 March 1976	Dundalk	4 – 1	Drogheda United	Oriel Park	League of Ireland	Round 23	Unknown
1976/77	24 October 1976	Dundalk	0 – 1	Drogheda United	Oriel Park	League of Ireland	Round 4	Unknown
1976/77	23 January 1977	Drogheda United	2 – 2	Dundalk	Lourdes Stadium	League of Ireland	Round 17	Unknown
1977/78	16 October 1977	Drogheda United	0 – 0	Dundalk	Lourdes Stadium	League of Ireland	Round 7	Unknown
1977/78	26 February 1978	Dundalk	1 – 1	Drogheda United	Oriel Park	League of Ireland	Round 22	Unknown
1978/79	29 October 1978	Dundalk	1 – 0	Drogheda United	Oriel Park	League of Ireland	Round 8	Unknown
1978/79	4 February 1979	Drogheda United	1 – 0	Dundalk	Lourdes Stadium	League of Ireland	Round 23	Unknown
1979/80	16 September 1979	Drogheda United	0 – 2	Dundalk	United Park	League of Ireland	Round 2	Unknown
1979/80	30 December 1979	Dundalk	1 – 1	Drogheda United	Oriel Park	League of Ireland	Round 17	Unknown
1980/81	11 September 1980	Dundalk	5 – 2	Drogheda United	Oriel Park	League of Ireland	Round 2	Unknown
1980/81	28 December 1980	Drogheda United	1 – 1	Dundalk	United Park	League of Ireland	Round 17	Unknown
1981/82	1 November 1981	Drogheda United	1 – 1	Dundalk	United Park	League of Ireland	Round 8	Unknown
1981/82	21 February 1982	Dundalk	5 – 1	Drogheda United	Oriel Park	League of Ireland	Round 23	Unknown
1982/83	5 December 1982	Drogheda United	3 – 1	Dundalk	United Park	League of Ireland	Round 10	Unknown
1982/83	20 March 1983	Dundalk	1 – 0	Drogheda United	Oriel Park	League of Ireland	Round 23	Unknown
1983/84	4 December 1983	Dundalk	3 – 0	Drogheda United	Oriel Park	League of Ireland	Round 10	Unknown
1983/84	25 March 1984	Drogheda United	0 – 3	Dundalk	United Park	League of Ireland	Round 23	Unknown
1984/85	23 September 1984	Drogheda United	0 – 0	Dundalk	United Park	League of Ireland	Round 2	Unknown
1984/85	6 January 1985	Dundalk	4 – 1	Drogheda United	Oriel Park	League of Ireland	Round 17	Unknown
1989/90	1 October 1989	Dundalk	1 – 0	Drogheda United	Oriel Park	Premier Division	Round 5	Unknown
1989/90	27 December 1989	Drogheda United	0 – 1	Dundalk	United Park	Premier Division	Round 17	Unknown
1989/90	22 February 1990	Dundalk	3 – 1	Drogheda United	Oriel Park	Premier Division	Round 27	Unknown
1991/92	6 October 1991	Dundalk	1 – 1	Drogheda United	Oriel Park	Premier Division	Round 6	Unknown
1991/92	22 December 1991	Drogheda United	2 – 2	Dundalk	United Park	Premier Division	Round 18	Unknown
1991/92	15 March 1992	Dundalk	0 – 0	Drogheda United	Oriel Park	Premier Division	Round 28	Unknown
1992/93	20 September 1992	Drogheda United	0 – 2	Dundalk	United Park	Premier Division	Round 4	Unknown
1992/93	4 December 1992	Dundalk	1 – 1	Drogheda United	Oriel Park	Premier Division	Round 16	Unknown
1993/94	26 August 1993	Dundalk	0 – 1	Drogheda United	Oriel Park	Premier Division	Round 4	Unknown
1993/94	12 November 1993	Drogheda United	0 – 3	Dundalk	United Park	Premier Division	Round 14	Unknown
1993/94	14 January 1994	Drogheda United	0 – 2	Dundalk	United Park	Premier Division	Round 11	Unknown
1993/94	17 March 1994	Dundalk	4 – 0	Drogheda United	Oriel Park	Premier Division	Round 17	Unknown
1995/96	20 October 1995	Drogheda United	3 – 2	Dundalk	United Park	Premier Division	Round 9	Unknown
1995/96	21 January 1996	Dundalk	2 – 2	Drogheda United	Oriel Park	Premier Division	Round 21	Unknown
1995/96	14 April 1996	Drogheda United	2 – 1	Dundalk	United Park	Premier Division	Round 31	Unknown
1997/98	23 October 1997	Dundalk	1 – 1	Drogheda United	Oriel Park	Premier Division	Round 9	Unknown
1997/98	23 January 1998	Drogheda United	1 – 0	Dundalk	United Park	Premier Division	Round 21	Unknown
1997/98	16 April 1998	Dundalk	0 – 2	Drogheda United	Oriel Park	Premier Division	Round 31	Unknown
2000/01	18 August 2000	Drogheda United	0 – 3	Dundalk	United Park	First Division	Round 3	Unknown
2000/01	19 October 2000	Dundalk	1 – 0	Drogheda United	Oriel Park	First Division	Round 12	Unknown
2000/01	22 December 2000	Drogheda United	0 – 3	Dundalk	United Park	First Division	Round 21	Unknown
2000/01	1 May 2001	Dundalk	1 – 0	Drogheda United	Oriel Park	First Division	Round 30	Unknown
2009	20 March 2009	Dundalk	3 – 0	Drogheda United	Oriel Park	Premier Division	Round 3	3,883
2009	15 May 2009	Drogheda United	1 – 1	Dundalk	United Park	Premier Division	Round 12	1,450
2009	24 July 2009	Dundalk	4 – 2	Drogheda United	Oriel Park	Premier Division	Round 21	3,100
2009	2 October 2009	Drogheda United	2 – 2	Dundalk	United Park	Premier Division	Round 30	2,000
2010	14 March 2010	Dundalk	2 – 2	Drogheda United	Oriel Park	Premier Division	Round 2	1,500
2010	30 April 2010	Drogheda United	1 – 3	Dundalk	United Park	Premier Division	Round 11	1,650
2010	5 July 2010	Dundalk	2 – 1	Drogheda United	Oriel Park	Premier Division	Round 20	1,500
2010	10 September 2010	Drogheda United	1 – 3	Dundalk	United Park	Premier Division	Round 29	1,400
2011	22 April 2011	Drogheda United	1 – 2	Dundalk	United Park	Premier Division	Round 8	1,300
2011	10 June 2011	Dundalk	1 – 2	Drogheda United	Oriel Park	Premier Division	Round 17	1,900
2011	12 August 2011	Drogheda United	2 – 2	Dundalk	United Park	Premier Division	Round 26	1,500
2011	21 October 2011	Dundalk	1 – 0	Drogheda United	Oriel Park	Premier Division	Round 35	700
2012	16 March 2012	Drogheda United	0 – 0	Dundalk	United Park	Premier Division	Round 3	1,287
2012	1 June 2012	Dundalk	1 – 2	Drogheda United	Oriel Park	Premier Division	Round 14	700
2012	31 August 2012	Drogheda United	3 – 2	Dundalk	United Park	Premier Division	Round 25	933
2013	28 March 2013	Dundalk	2 – 2	Drogheda United	Oriel Park	Premier Division	Round 5	2,198
2013	10 June 2013	Drogheda United	0 – 1	Dundalk	United Park	Premier Division	Round 16	1,470
2013	8 September 2013	Dundalk	1 – 0	Drogheda United	Oriel Park	Premier Division	Round 27	3,324
2014	7 March 2014	Drogheda United	4 – 1	Dundalk	United Park	Premier Division	Round 1	2,007
2014	20 May 2014	Dundalk	7 – 0	Drogheda United	Oriel Park	Premier Division	Round 12	2,383
2014	8 August 2014	Drogheda United	1 – 1	Dundalk	United Park	Premier Division	Round 23	2,045
2015	10 April 2015	Dundalk	1 – 0	Drogheda United	Oriel Park	Premier Division	Round 7	3,457
2015	3 July 2015	Drogheda United	1 – 2	Dundalk	United Park	Premier Division	Round 18	2,000
2015	18 September 2015	Dundalk	6 – 0	Drogheda United	Oriel Park	Premier Division	Round 28	3,207
2017	31 March 2017	Dundalk	3 – 1	Drogheda United	Oriel Park	Premier Division	Round 7	3,015
2017	16 June 2017	Drogheda United	0 – 6	Dundalk	United Park	Premier Division	Round 18	1,800
2017	22 September 2017	Dundalk	3 – 0	Drogheda United	Oriel Park	Premier Division	Round 29	2,094
2021	24 April 2021	Dundalk	2 – 1	Drogheda United	Oriel Park	Premier Division	Round 7	0
2021	21 June 2021	Drogheda United	0 – 1	Dundalk	United Park	Premier Division	Round 17	100
2021	20 August 2021	Dundalk	1 – 2	Drogheda United	Oriel Park	Premier Division	Round 25	500
2021	4 November 2021	Drogheda United	0 – 1	Dundalk	United Park	Premier Division	Round 35	1,861
2022	18 March 2022	Drogheda United	1 – 0	Dundalk	United Park	Premier Division	Round 7	2,065
2022	29 April 2022	Dundalk	4 – 1	Drogheda United	Oriel Park	Premier Division	Round 13	2,832
2022	8 July 2022	Drogheda United	1 – 0	Dundalk	United Park	Premier Division	Round 23	2,158
2022	30 September 2022	Dundalk	2 – 0	Drogheda United	Oriel Park	Premier Division	Round 31	2,364
2023	16 March 2023	Drogheda United	0 – 1	Dundalk	United Park	Premier Division	Round 6	2,193
2023	28 April 2023	Dundalk	3 – 2	Drogheda United	Oriel Park	Premier Division	Round 12	2,825
2023	23 June 2023	Drogheda United	1 – 2	Dundalk	United Park	Premier Division	Round 21	2,278
2023	29 September 2023	Dundalk	3 – 1	Drogheda United	Oriel Park	Premier Division	Round 32	2,827
2024	1 April 2024	Dundalk	0 – 0	Drogheda United	Oriel Park	Premier Division	Round 8	2,458
2024	6 May 2024	Drogheda United	2 – 1	Dundalk	United Park	Premier Division	Round 14	2,339
2024	12 July 2024	Dundalk	4 – 2	Drogheda United	Oriel Park	Premier Division	Round 24	2,776
2024	1 November 2024	Drogheda United	0 – 0	Dundalk	United Park	Premier Division	Round 36	2,030
2026	20 February 2026	Dundalk	1 – 1	Drogheda United	Oriel Park	Premier Division	Round 3	3,819
2026	22 May 2026	Drogheda United	1 – 1	Dundalk	United Park	Premier Division	Round 18	2,547
2026	10 July 2026	Dundalk	1 – 2	Drogheda United	Oriel Park	Premier Division	Round 24	2,658
2026	28 August 2026	Drogheda United	2 – 3	Dundalk	United Park	Premier Division	Round 29	2,436

=== Cup results ===
As of 19 July 2024

Season	Date	Home team	Result	Away team	Stadium	Competition	Round	Attendance
1963/64	16 August 1963	Dundalk	4 – 3	Drogheda	Oriel Park	Dublin City Cup	Round 1	4,000
1963/64	8 September 1963	Dundalk	3 – 1	Drogheda	Oriel Park	League of Ireland Shield	Round 1	Unknown
1964/65	16 August 1964	Dundalk	2 – 1	Drogheda	Oriel Park	LFA President's Cup	Round 1	Unknown
1964/65	27 August 1964	Drogheda	3 – 1	Dundalk	Lourdes Stadium	Dublin City Cup	Round 1	Unknown
1964/65	6 September 1964	Drogheda	0 – 1	Dundalk	Lourdes Stadium	League of Ireland Shield	Round 1	Unknown
1965/66	16 August 1965	Dundalk	0 – 1	Drogheda	Oriel Park	LFA President's Cup	Round 1	Unknown
1965/66	26 August 1965	Dundalk	2 – 1 (AET)	Drogheda	Oriel Park	Dublin City Cup	Round 1	Unknown
1966/67	25 August 1966	Dundalk	2 – 0	Drogheda	Oriel Park	Dublin City Cup	Round 1	Unknown
1966/67	4 September 1966	Drogheda	1 – 4	Dundalk	Lourdes Stadium	League of Ireland Shield	Round 1	Unknown
1967/68	24 September 1967	Drogheda	0 – 1	Dundalk	Lourdes Stadium	League of Ireland Shield	Round 1	Unknown
1968/69	22 September 1968	Dundalk	5 – 0	Drogheda	Oriel Park	League of Ireland Shield	Round 2	Unknown
1970/71	3 September 1970	Drogheda	3 – 1	Dundalk	Lourdes Stadium	Dublin City Cup	Round 1	Unknown
1971/72	10 September 1971	Dundalk	3 – 0	Drogheda	Oriel Park	League of Ireland Shield	Round 1	Unknown
1971/72	17 March 1972	Dundalk	5 – 0	Drogheda	Oriel Park	League of Ireland Shield	Final	Unknown
1972/73	6 August 1972	Dundalk	3 – 1	Drogheda	Oriel Park	LFA President's Cup	Round 1	Unknown
1972/73	10 September 1972	Drogheda	0 – 0	Dundalk	Lourdes Stadium	League of Ireland Shield	Round 1	Unknown
1973/74	8 November 1973	Dundalk	2 – 0	Drogheda	Oriel Park	Leinster Senior Cup	Semi-final	Unknown
1974/75	1 September 1974	Dundalk	1 – 1	Drogheda	Oriel Park	League Cup	Group stage	Unknown
1974/75	20 September 1974	Dundalk	1 – 4	Drogheda	Oriel Park	Leinster Senior Cup	Round 2	Unknown
1975/76	25 September 1975	Dundalk	1 – 2	Drogheda United	Oriel Park	Leinster Senior Cup	Round 1	Unknown
1979/80	10 August 1979	Dundalk	0 – 1	Drogheda United	Oriel Park	Tyler Cup	Semi-final	Unknown
1980/81	29 October 1980	Dundalk	5 – 0	Drogheda United	Oriel Park	League Cup	Semi-final	Unknown
1980/81	8 March 1981	Drogheda United	0 – 0	Dundalk	United Park	FAI Cup	Quarter-final	Unknown
1980/81	12 March 1981	Dundalk	1 – 0	Drogheda United	Oriel Park	FAI Cup	Quarter-final replay	Unknown
1981/82	30 August 1981	Drogheda United	0 – 0 (AET) (PENS 5-4)	Dundalk	United Park	League Cup	Round 1	Unknown
1981/82	30 September 1981	Dundalk	2 – 0	Drogheda United	Oriel Park	Leinster Senior Cup	Quarter-final	Unknown
1982/83	5 September 1982	Dundalk	1 – 1 (AET) PENS 0 – 3	Drogheda United	Oriel Park	Leinster Senior Cup	Quarter-final	Unknown
1982/83	19 September 1982	Drogheda United	2 – 7	Dundalk	United Park	League Cup	Group stage	Unknown
1983/84	18 September 1983	Dundalk	1 – 1	Drogheda United	Oriel Park	League Cup	Group stage	Unknown
1984/85	2 September 1984	Dundalk	2 – 0	Drogheda United	Oriel Park	League Cup	Group stage	Unknown
1985/86	12 September 1985	Dundalk	3 – 2	Drogheda United	Oriel Park	League Cup	Group stage	Unknown
1985/86	22 September 1985	Drogheda United	2 – 2	Dundalk	United Park	League Cup	Group stage	Unknown
1986/87	14 September 1986	Dundalk	0 – 0	Drogheda United	Oriel Park	League Cup	Group stage	Unknown
1986/87	12 October 1986	Drogheda United	0 – 1	Dundalk	United Park	League Cup	Group stage	Unknown
1986/87	1 February 1987	Dundalk	2 – 0	Drogheda United	Oriel Park	FAI Cup	Round 4	2,500
1987/88	6 August 1987	Dundalk	3 – 1	Drogheda United	Oriel Park	Leinster Senior Cup	Round 1	Unknown
1987/88	3 September 1987	Dundalk	2 – 0	Drogheda United	Oriel Park	League Cup	Group stage	Unknown
1988/89	21 August 1988	Drogheda United	0 – 2	Dundalk	United Park	League Cup	Group stage	Unknown
1989/90	10 August 1989	Drogheda United	1 – 0	Dundalk	United Park	Leinster Senior Cup	Round 1	Unknown
1989/90	16 August 1989	Dundalk	1 – 1	Drogheda United	Oriel Park	League Cup	Group stage	Unknown
1990/91	26 August 1990	Drogheda United	0 – 0	Dundalk	United Park	League Cup	Group stage	Unknown
1991/92	22 August 1991	Dundalk	2 – 0	Drogheda United	Oriel Park	League Cup	Group stage	Unknown
1992/93	27 August 1992	Drogheda United	1 – 0	Dundalk	United Park	League Cup	Group stage	Unknown
1993/94	5 August 1993	Drogheda United	1 – 2	Dundalk	United Park	Leinster Senior Cup	Round 1	Unknown
1993/94	15 August 1993	Dundalk	0 – 1	Drogheda United	Oriel Park	League Cup	Round 1	Unknown
1994/95	11 August 1994	Drogheda United	0 – 5	Dundalk	United Park	League Cup	Group stage	Unknown
1995/96	24 August 1995	Drogheda United	2 – 2	Dundalk	United Park	League Cup	Group stage	Unknown
1995/96	12 January 1996	Dundalk	1 – 1	Drogheda United	Oriel Park	FAI Cup	Round 1	4,000
1995/96	18 January 1996	Drogheda United	2 – 1 (AET)	Dundalk	United Park	FAI Cup	Round 1 replay	4,500
1996/97	22 August 1996	Drogheda United	1 – 0	Dundalk	United Park	League Cup	Group stage	Unknown
1997/98	26 August 1997	Dundalk	5 – 0	Drogheda United	Oriel Park	League Cup	Group stage	Unknown
1998/99	20 August 1998	Drogheda United	0 – 0	Dundalk	United Park	League Cup	Group stage	Unknown
2001/02	1 November 2001	Drogheda United	2 – 1	Dundalk	United Park	League Cup	Round 1	Unknown
2003	13 May 2003	Dundalk	2 – 1	Drogheda United	Oriel Park	League Cup	Group stage	Unknown
2004	10 May 2004	Drogheda United	4 – 1	Dundalk	United Park	League Cup	Group stage	Unknown
2004	25 July 2004	Dundalk	0 – 0	Drogheda United	Oriel Park	FAI Cup	Round 2	Unknown
2004	30 July 2004	Drogheda United	3 – 2	Dundalk	United Park	FAI Cup	Round 2 replay	Unknown
2005	25 August 2005	Dundalk	0 – 2	Drogheda United	Oriel Park	FAI Cup	Round 3	4,152
2006	8 May 2006	Dundalk	0 – 1	Drogheda United	Oriel Park	League Cup	Round 2	Unknown
2011	26 August 2011	Drogheda United	1 – 1	Dundalk	United Park	FAI Cup	Round 4	1,500
2011	30 August 2011	Dundalk	2 – 1	Drogheda United	Oriel Park	FAI Cup	Round 4 replay	1,484
2012	25 June 2012	Drogheda United	1 – 1 (AET) (PENS 3-2)	Dundalk	United Park	League Cup	Quarter-final	950
2013	6 October 2013	Drogheda United	1 – 0	Dundalk	United Park	FAI Cup	Semi-final	2,000
2017	8 September 2017	Dundalk	4 – 0	Drogheda United	Oriel Park	FAI Cup	Quarter-final	2,493
2024	2 February 2024	Dundalk	1 – 2	Drogheda United	Oriel Park	Leinster Senior Cup	Group stage	2,061
2024	19 July 2024	Drogheda United	2 – 1	Dundalk	United Park	FAI Cup	Round 2	2,280

=== Friendly results ===
As of 30 January 2026

Season	Date	Home team	Result	Away team	Stadium	Competition	Attendance
1966	14 August 1966	Dundalk	4 – 1	Drogheda	Oriel Park	Donegan Cup	Unknown
1966	20 August 1966	Drogheda	1 – 1	Dundalk	Lourdes Stadium	Donegan Cup	Unknown
1968	26 December 1968	Dundalk	2 – 1	Drogheda	Oriel Park	Donegan Cup	Unknown
1973	19 August 1973	Drogheda	2 – 2 (PENS 5 – 4)	Dundalk	Lourdes Stadium	Donegan Cup	Unknown
1974	25 August 1974	Dundalk	2 – 2 (PENS 4 – 3)	Drogheda	Oriel Park	Donegan Cup	Unknown
1975	17 August 1975	Dundalk	2 – 2 (PENS 3 – 1)	Drogheda United	Oriel Park	Donegan Cup	Unknown
1976	1 August 1976	Dundalk	1 – 1 (PENS 3 – 4)	Drogheda United	Oriel Park	Donegan Cup	Unknown
1977	12 August 1977	Dundalk	3 – 3 (PENS 4 – 3)	Drogheda United	Oriel Park	Donegan Cup	Unknown
1978	7 September 1978	Dundalk	3 – 0	Drogheda United	Oriel Park	Donegan Cup	Unknown
1984	24 August 1984	Dundalk	3 – 1	Drogheda United	Oriel Park	Donegan Cup	Unknown
1997	5 October 1997	Dundalk	2 – 2 (PENS 2 – 4)	Drogheda United	Oriel Park	Jim Malone Cup	Unknown
1999	11 July 1999	Dundalk	0 – 0 (PENS 2 – 4)	Drogheda United	Oriel Park	Jim Malone Cup	Unknown
2000	5 August 2000	Drogheda United	0 – 3	Dundalk	United Park	Jim Malone Cup	Unknown
2001	1 August 2001	Dundalk	0 – 0 (PENS 4 – 5)	Drogheda United	Oriel Park	Jim Malone Cup	Unknown
2002	1 September 2002	Drogheda United	0 – 0 (PENS 5 – 4)	Dundalk	United Park	Jim Malone Cup	Unknown
2003	5 April 2003	Drogheda United	0 – 0 (PENS 7 – 6)	Dundalk	Claremont Stadium	Jim Malone Cup	Unknown
2004	13 March 2004	Dundalk	1 – 1 (PENS 7 – 8)	Drogheda United	Oriel Park	Jim Malone Cup	Unknown
2006	15 February 2006	Dundalk	? – ?	Drogheda United	Oriel Park	Jim Malone Cup	Unknown
2007	20 February 2007	Dundalk	1 – 2	Drogheda United	Oriel Park	Jim Malone Cup	Unknown
2008	7 February 2008	Dundalk	0 – 0 (PENS 4 – 5)	Drogheda United	Oriel Park	Jim Malone Cup	1,500
2009	24 February 2009	Drogheda United	0 – 0 (PENS 4 – 3)	Dundalk	United Park	Jim Malone Cup	Unknown
2010	18 February 2010	Dundalk	2 – 1	Drogheda United	Oriel Park	Jim Malone Cup	375
2012	16 February 2012	Drogheda United	1 – 0	Dundalk	United Park	Jim Malone Cup	Unknown
2013	1 March 2013	Dundalk	0 – 0 (PENS 4 – 5)	Drogheda United	Oriel Park	Jim Malone Cup	600
2014	7 February 2014	Drogheda United	1 – 1 (PENS 5 – 4)	Dundalk	United Park	Jim Malone Cup	900
2015	20 February 2015	Dundalk	2 – 0	Drogheda United	Oriel Park	Jim Malone Cup	1,195
2016	19 February 2016	Drogheda United	0 – 2	Dundalk	United Park	Jim Malone Cup	750
2018	27 January 2018	Dundalk	3 – 1	Drogheda United	Oriel Park	Jim Malone Cup	750
2019	25 January 2019	Dundalk	5 – 1	Drogheda United	Oriel Park	Jim Malone Cup	750
2020	30 January 2020	Dundalk	2 – 0	Drogheda United	Oriel Park	Jim Malone Cup	750
2020	17 July 2020	Dundalk	1 – 0	Drogheda United	Oriel Park	Friendly	0
2021	6 March 2021	Drogheda United	2 – 3	Dundalk	United Park	Jim Malone Cup	0
2022	11 February 2022	Dundalk	1 – 2	Drogheda United	Oriel Park	Jim Malone Cup	1,300
2023	3 February 2023	Drogheda United	0 – 0 (PENS 6 – 5)	Dundalk	United Park	Jim Malone Cup	1,200
2024	2 February 2024	Dundalk	1 – 2	Drogheda United	Oriel Park	Jim Malone Cup	2,061
2025	31 January 2025	Dundalk	1 – 0	Drogheda United	Oriel Park	Jim Malone Cup	2,197
2026	30 January 2026	Drogheda United	1 – 1 (PENS 2 – 4)	Dundalk	Abbottstown	Jim Malone Cup	0

== Statistics ==
As of 28 August 2026

Competition	Games	Drogheda United wins	Draws	Dundalk wins	Drogheda United goals	Dundalk goals
League of Ireland Premier Division	110	23	29	58	112	203
League of Ireland First Division	4	0	0	4	0	8
FAI Cup	13	5	4	4	13	15
League of Ireland Cup	27	8	8	11	22	46
Leinster Senior Cup	9	5	0	4	12	13
League of Ireland Shield	8	0	1	7	2	22
Dublin City Cup	5	2	0	3	10	10
LFA President's Cup	3	2	0	1	3	5
Tyler Cup	1	1	0	0	1	0
Friendlies	31	17	1	18	29	54
TOTAL	216	63	43	110	204	376

== Records ==
=== Top scorers ===
As of 28 August 2026. Includes friendly matches.

#	Name	Goals	Club(s)
1	(Republic of Ireland) David McMillan	11	Dundalk (2014–2017, 2020–2022)
2	(Republic of Ireland) Michael Duffy	9	Dundalk (2017–2021)
2	(Republic of Ireland) Patrick Hoban	9	Dundalk (2013–2014, 2018–2023)
4	(Republic of Ireland) Richie Towell	6	Dundalk (2013–2015)
5	(Republic of Ireland) Daryl Horgan	5	Dundalk (2014–2016, 2023–present)
5	(Australia) Mark Griffin	5	Dundalk (2014), Drogheda United (2016–2017)
7	(Republic of Ireland) Declan O'Brien	4	Drogheda United (2001–2008, 2012–2014), Dundalk (2009)
7	(Northern Ireland) Chris Turner	4	Dundalk (2009)
7	(Republic of Ireland) Ciaran Kilduff	4	Dundalk (2015–2017)
7	(Republic of Ireland) Georgie Kelly	4	Dundalk (2018–2020)

=== Most appearances ===
As of 28 August 2026. Includes friendly matches.

#	Name	Games	Club(s)
1	(Republic of Ireland) Ryan Brennan	31	Drogheda United (2010, 2012–13, 2022–present)
1	(Scotland) Peter Cherrie	31	Dundalk (2009–2014, 2021–2023, 2024–present)
3	(Republic of Ireland) Andy Boyle	29	Dundalk (2013–2016, 2019–2024)
4	(Republic of Ireland) Chris Shields	27	Dundalk (2012–2021)
5	(Republic of Ireland) Dane Massey	26	Dundalk (2013–2020), Drogheda United (2021–2022)
6	(Republic of Ireland) John Mountney	25	Dundalk (2012–2020, 2022–2024)
7	(Republic of Ireland) Patrick Hoban	24	Dundalk (2013–2014, 2018–2023)
8	(Republic of Ireland) Alan McNally	23	Drogheda United (2009–2014)
9	(Republic of Ireland) Tiernán Mulvenna	22	Dundalk (2006–2010, 2013), Drogheda United (2011–2012, 2015)
10	(Republic of Ireland) Conor Kane	21	Drogheda United (2017–2021, 2023–present)
10	(Republic of Ireland) David McMillan	21	Dundalk (2014–2016, 2020–2022)
12	(Republic of Ireland) Daryl Horgan	20	Dundalk (2014–2016, 2023–present)
12	(Republic of Ireland) Keith Ward	20	Dundalk (2011, 2013–2014, 2022–2023, 2025)

=== Other records ===
As of 28 August 2026

First Dundalk win	Dundalk 4–3 Drogheda United, Dublin City Cup, 16 August 1963, Oriel Park
First Drogheda win	Dundalk 1–3 Drogheda United, League of Ireland, 22 November 1964, Oriel Park
Largest Dundalk win	Dundalk 7–0 Drogheda United, Premier Division, 20 May 2014, Oriel Park
Largest Drogheda win	Drogheda United 4–1 Dundalk, Premier Division, 7 March 2014, United Park
Highest scoring match	Drogheda United 2–7 Dundalk, League Cup, 19 September 1982, United Park
Largest home win	Dundalk 7–0 Drogheda United, Premier Division, 20 May 2014, Oriel Park
Largest away win	Drogheda United 0–6 Dundalk, Premier Division, 16 June 2017, United Park
Longest winning streak	16 games (Dundalk, 20 February 2015–21 June 2021) (6 years, 4 months, 1 day)
Longest unbeaten streak	18 games (Dundalk, 20 May 2014–21 June 2021) (7 years, 1 month, 1 day)
Most goals in a single match (player)	4 (Richie Towell, Dundalk 6–0 Drogheda United, Premier Division, 18 September 2015, Oriel Park)
Highest attendance	4,500 (Drogheda United 2–1 Dundalk, FAI Cup, 18 January 1996, United Park)
Most yellow cards in a single match	10 (Drogheda United 0–0 Dundalk, Premier Division, 16 August 2012, United Park)
Most red cards in a single match	3 (Drogheda United 4–1 Dundalk, Premier Division, 7 March 2014, United Park)
Most red cards (player)	3 (Eric Foley)
Most frequent venue	Oriel Park (118 games)

== See also ==
- Local derby
- Derbies in the League of Ireland
