= 2012 FAI Cup =

FAI Ford Cup

Tournament details
- Country: Ireland
- Teams: 40

Final positions
- Champions: Derry City
- Runners-up: St Patrick's Athletic

The 2012 FAI Senior Challenge Cup, also known as the 2012 FAI Ford Senior Cup, was the 92nd season of the national football competition of Ireland. The winners of the competition earned spots in both the second qualifying round of the 2013-14 UEFA Europa League and the 2013 Setanta Sports Cup.

A total of 40 team competed in the 2012 competition, which commenced on the weekend ending on 1 April 2012. The teams entered from the 2012 League of Ireland Premier Division and First Division received byes into the second round stage. Four non-league clubs also received byes to the second round. The remaining 12 teams entered at the first round stage. These teams are composed of the sixteen clubs, which reached the fourth round of the 2011–12 FAI Intermediate Cup. The cup was won by Derry City.

== Teams ==
| Round | Clubs remaining | Clubs involved | Winners from previous round | New entries this round | Leagues entering at this round |
|---|---|---|---|---|---|
| First round | 40 | 16 | none | 16 | Leinster Senior League; Munster Senior League; Ulster Senior League |
| Second round | 32 | 32 | 8 | 24 | Premier Division; First Division |
| Third round | 16 | 16 | 16 | none | none |
| Quarter-finals | 8 | 8 | 8 | none | none |
| Semi-finals | 4 | 4 | 4 | none | none |
| Final | 2 | 2 | 2 | none | none |

== Calendar ==
The calendar for the 2012 FAI Cup, as announced by Football Association of Ireland.

| Round | Main date | Number of fixtures | Clubs | New entries this round | Prize money |
|---|---|---|---|---|---|
| First round | 1 April 2012 | 8 | 40 → 32 | 16: 40th–25th | n/a |
| Second round | 25 May 2012 | 16 | 32 → 16 | 24: 24th–1st | n/a |
| Third round | 24 August 2012 | 8 | 16 → 8 | none | n/a |
| Quarter-finals | 14 September | 4 | 8 → 4 | none | n/a |
| Semi-finals | 7 October | 2 | 4 → 2 | none | n/a |
| Final | 4 November | 1 | 2 → 1 | none | Winner €50,000 runner – up €25,000 |

== First round ==
The draw for this round was conducted by FAI President Paddy McCaul and former player and 7-time winner Mick Neville at the FAI headquarters in Abbotstown on 6 March 2011. 16 of the 20 non-League of Ireland clubs are participating in this round, with the remaining 4 clubs earning a bye to the second round. The matches were played on the weekend ending 1 April 2012.

| 30 March 2012 | Crumlin United | 1−0 | Kilbarrack United | Christian Brothers School Ground |
| 18:00 IST | Forsyth 72' | Report | | Referee: Dave Fisher |

| 30 March 2012 | Phoenix FC | 4−3 | Lucan United | Martin Savage Park |
| 19:45 IST | Dawson 59', 69'; Brophy 76', 78' | Report | 28' Quinn; 37' Donoghue; 40' Rutherford | Referee: Declan Troy |

| 31 March 2012 | Malahide United | 2−1 | College Corinthians | Gannon Park |
| 14:00 IST | Crowe 53'; McGinty 79' | Report | 33' Stanton | Referee: Richie Glynn |

| 1 April 2012 | Cherry Orchard | 2−0 | Verona | Elmdale Crescent |
| 11:00 IST | Daly 65'; Carroll 75' | Report | | Referee: Tommy Traynor |

| 1 April 2012 | Kildrum Tigers | 1−0 | Clonmel Celtic | Station Road Park |
| 13:00 IST | Carlin 49' | Report | | Referee: Stephen Toner |

| 1 April 2012 | Ballymun United | 1−2 | Mayfield United | Ballymun United Soccer Complex |
| 14:00 IST | McDonnell 90+2' | Report | 7' Fleming; 68' Hurley | Referee: Joe O'Hanlon |

| 1 April 2012 | Douglas Hall | 2−1 | Killester United | Moneygourney |
| 14:00 IST | Murphy 42'; Wilkinson 62' | Report | 84' Keogh | Referee: Damien O'Mahony |

| 1 April 2012 | Avondale United | 3−1 | Sheriff Y.C. | Avondale Park |
| 14:30 IST | Long 22'; Lougheed 32'; Meade 82' | Report | 45' Dunne | Referee: Pat Murphy |

== Second round ==
The draw for this round was conducted by FAI President Paddy McCaul at the FAI headquarters in Abbotstown on 30 April 2012. The 8 winners from the first round are joined by Blarney United, Drumkeen United, Everton AFC, St. Patrick's CY, which received byes for the first round, and the 20 League of Ireland clubs. The matches were played on the weekend ending 27 May 2012.

| 25 May 2012 | Bray Wanderers | 1−1 | Shelbourne | Carlisle Grounds |
| 19:05 IST | Waters 63' | Report | Clancy 35' | Referee: Damien Hancock |

| 25 May 2012 | Drogheda United | 6−1 | Mayfield United | Hunky Dorys Park |
| 19:45 IST | Hynes 10'; O'Brien 12'; G. Brennan 45+1'; Breen 84', 88', 90+2' | Report | Kelly 74' | Attendance: 392; Referee: Neil Doyle |

| 25 May 2012 | SD Galway | 0−2 | Mervue United | Terryland Park |
| 19:45 IST | | Report | Hoban 58'; Nkololo 86' | Attendance: 228; Referee: Conor Fitzgerald |

| 25 May 2012 | UCD | 3−1 | Phoenix FC | UCD Bowl |
| IST | O'Conor 27'; Ledwith 76'; Rusk 81' | Report | Dawson 33' (pen.) | Attendance: 150; Referee: Richie Winter |

| 25 May 2012 | Cork City | 6−1 | Athlone Town | Turners Cross |
| 19:45 IST | Sullivan 34', 39', 56'; Purcell 36', 74', 84' (pen.) | Report | McCarthy 4' | Attendance: 1,589; Referee: Padraigh Sutton |

| 25 May 2012 | Sligo Rovers | 1−3 | Monaghan United | The Showgrounds |
| 19:45 IST | Quigley 8' (pen.) | Report | Griffiths 29'; Marks 72'; Quinn 84' (pen.) | Referee: Paul McLaughlin |

| 25 May 2012 | Blarney United | 1−4 | Malahide United | O'Shea Park |
| 19:45 IST | O'Brien 26' | Report | O'Keeffe 6'; Crowe 59'; Corcoran 88'; Donnelly 90' | Attendance: 100; Referee: Graham Kelly |

| 25 May 2012 | Dundalk | 1−0 | St. Patrick's C.Y.F.C. | Oriel Park |
| 19:45 IST | Mountney 49' | Report | | Attendance: 300; Referee: Tom Connolly |

| 25 May 2012 | Derry City | 4−0 | Finn Harps | Brandywell |
| 19:45 IST | McLaughlin 31', 39'; Patterson 58'; Molloy 59' | Report | | Attendance: 900; Referee: Paul Tuite |

| 25 May 2012 | Bohemians | 5−0 | Drumkeen United | Dalymount Park |
| 19:45 IST | Scully 1', 66', 77'; Lopes 24'; Mulcahy 86' | Report | | Attendance: 510; Referee: Derek Tomney |

| 25 May 2012 | Shamrock Rovers | 1−0 | Limerick | Tallaght Stadium |
| 20:00 IST | O'Donnell 67' | Report | | Attendance: 1,300; Referee: Anthony Buttimer |

| 27 May 2012 | Kildrum Tigers | 1−3 | Avondale United | Station Road Park |
| 13:00 IST | Carlin 76' | Report | O'Sullivan 10', 69'; Meade 53' | Referee: Terence Moyne |

| 27 May 2012 | Cherry Orchard | 2−0 | Longford Town | Frank Cooke Park |
| 14:00 IST | Sheppard 24'; Caul 76' | Report | | Referee: Adriano Reale |

| 27 May 2012 | Douglas Hall | 1−1 | Wexford Youths | Moneygourney |
| 14:00 IST | Kelleher 54' | Report | Broaders 81' | Attendance: 200; Referee: Andrew Mullally |

| 27 May 2012 | Everton AFC | 0−1 | Waterford United | Everton Park |
| 15:00 IST | | Report | Breen 40' | Referee: James McKell |

| 27 May 2012 | Crumlin United | 0−3 | St. Patrick's Athletic | Richmond Park |
| 15:00 IST | | Report | Griffin 3' (o.g.); Carroll 12'; Kelly 87' | Attendance: 600; Referee: Dave McKeon |

=== Second round Replays ===
| 28 May 2012 | Shelbourne | 1−0 | Bray Wanderers | Tolka Park |
| 20:00 IST | Gorman 45+1' | Report |

| 29 May 2012 | Wexford Youths | 3−2 | Douglas Hall | Ferrycarrig Park |
| 19:45 IST | Broaders 8' (pen.); Nolan 53', 89' | Report | Fox 10'; Wilkinson 18' | Attendance: 166; Referee: Sean Grant |

== Third round ==
The draw for the third round was made on 16 July on Monday Night Soccer. The draw was conducted with only 15 clubs due to the exit of Monaghan United from senior football. St. Patrick's Athletic were first drawn out and therefore received a bye.

| 24 August 2012 | Shamrock Rovers | 2−0 | Cork City | Tallaght Stadium |
| 19:05 IST | Stewart 70', 77' | Report | | Attendance: 1,400; Referee: Padraigh Sutton |

| 24 August 2012 | Bohemians | 1−0 | Avondale United | Dalymount Park |
| 19:45 IST | McMillan 43' | Report | | Attendance: 474; Referee: Tom Connolly |

| 24 August 2012 | Drogheda United | 1−0 | Wexford Youths | Hunky Dorys Park |
| 19:45 IST | Hynes 27' | Report | | Attendance: 431; Referee: Paul McLaughlin |

| 24 August 2012 | Malahide United | 0−4 | Dundalk | Gannon Park |
| IST | | Report | Shanahan 9'; Griffin 45+1'; Shannon 75'; McKenna 90' | Attendance: 450; Referee: James McKell |

| 24 August 2012 | UCD | 0−1 | Derry City | UCD Bowl |
| 19:45 IST | | Report | McDaid 70' | Attendance: 186; Referee: Anthony Buttimer |

| 24 August 2012 | Shelbourne | 3−2 | Cherry Orchard | Tolka Park |
| 20:00 IST | Hughes 39' (pen.), 79'; C. Byrne 82' | Report | Hughes 30' (pen.), 84' | Attendance: 442; Referee: Rob Rogers |

| 3 September 2012 | Waterford United | 0−4 | Mervue United | Waterford Regional Sports Centre |
| 19:45 IST | | Report | Hoban 34'; Biansumba 57'; Nkololo 83', 84' | Referee: Kevin O'Regan |

== Quarter-finals ==
The draw for the quarter-finals was made on 27 August on Monday Night Soccer. Fixtures took place on the weekend of 16 September 2012.

| 14 September 2012 | Shelbourne | 2−1 | Shamrock Rovers | Tolka Park |
| 20:00 IST | Hughes 30', 71' | Report | Gannon 90+2' | Attendance: 2,255; Referee: Alan Kelly |

| 14 September 2012 | Bohemians | 0−1 | Dundalk | Dalymount Park |
| 20:00 IST | | Report | Griffin 75' | Attendance: 1,108; Referee: Derek Tomney |

| 14 September 2012 | St Patrick's Athletic | 0−0 | Drogheda United | Richmond Park |
| 19:45 IST | | Report | | Attendance: 1,346; Referee: Paul Tuite |

| 14 September 2012 | Derry City | 7−1 | Mervue United | Brandywell Stadium |
| 19:45 IST | McDaid 15', 56'; Farren 35', 60', 61'; McEleney 40'; Curran 77' | Report | Hoban 52' | Attendance: 1,200; Referee: Tomas Connolly |

=== Quarter-finals replays ===
| 17 September 2012 | Drogheda United | 1−1 (a.e.t.) (2−3 p) | St Patrick's Athletic | Hunky Dorys Park |
| 19:45 IST | Prendergast 79' | Report | Faherty 90' | Attendance: 1,115; Referee: Damien Hancock |
| | Penalties |
| | Foley (penalty scored); Mulvenna (penalty missed); Hynes (penalty scored); S. Brennan (penalty missed); G. Brennan (penalty missed) | | (penalty scored) O'Connor; (penalty scored) J. Kelly; (penalty missed) Bermingham; (penalty scored) Faherty |

== Semifinals ==
The draw for the semifinals was made on 17 September on Monday Night Soccer. Fixtures took place on the weekend of 7 October 2012.

| 7 October 2012 | Derry City | 1−1 | Shelbourne | Brandywell Stadium |
| 13:45 IST | McDaid 58' | Report | Cassidy 5' | Attendance: 1,800; Referee: Damien Hancock |

| 7 October 2012 | Dundalk | 0−3 | St Patrick's Athletic | Oriel Park |
| 15:55 IST | | Report | Browne 21'; Bolger 53'; O'Connor 85' | Attendance: 2,020; Referee: Alan Kelly |

=== Semi-finals replays ===
| 10 October 2012 | Shelbourne | 0−3 | Derry City | Tolka Park |
| 19:45 IST | | Report | McLaughlin 44', 62'; McDaid 68' | Attendance: 1,417; Referee: Anthony Buttimer |

== Final ==
4 November 2012
15:30 CEST

| Derry City | 3−2 (a.e.t.) | St Patrick's Athletic |
|---|---|---|
| Greacen 55'; Patterson 69' (pen.), 105' | Report | O'Connor 53'; Fagan 87' |

Aviva Stadium
Attendance: 16,117
Referee: Neil Doyle
