= Ryan Brennan =

Irish footballer (born 1991)

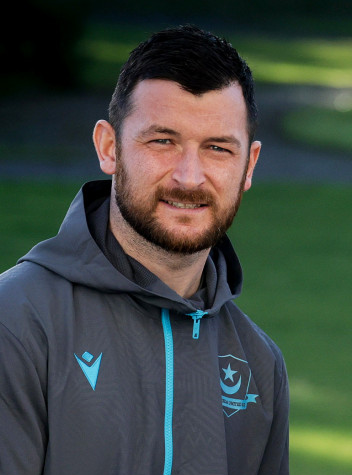
- Brennan in 2025

Personal information
- Full name: Ryan Brennan
- Date of birth: 11 November 1991 (age 35)
- Place of birth: Drogheda, County Louth, Ireland
- Height: 1.80 m (5 ft 11 in)
- Position: Midfielder

Youth career
- 1996–2007: Drogheda Boys
- 2007–2010: Drogheda United

Senior career*
Years	Team	Apps	(Gls)
2010	Drogheda United	29	(0)
2011	Monaghan United	23	(6)
2012–2013	Drogheda United	53	(9)
2014–2015	Shamrock Rovers	49	(4)
2016–2017	Bray Wanderers	51	(8)
2018	St Patrick's Athletic	34	(4)
2019–2021	Shelbourne	69	(23)
2022–2026	Drogheda United	147	(14)
Total		455	(68)
- * Club domestic league appearances and goals as of 18:22, 10 November 2026 (UTC)

Ryan Brennan (born 11 November 1991) is an Irish former professional footballer who played as a midfielder for League of Ireland Premier Division club Drogheda United, Monaghan United, Shamrock Rovers, Bray Wanderers, St Patrick's Athletic and Shelbourne.

== Career ==
=== Youth career ===
Born and raised in Drogheda, County Louth, Brennan played at every schoolboy age group for local side Drogheda Boys, before joining the academy of local League of Ireland club Drogheda United in 2007.

=== Drogheda United ===
He made his senior League of Ireland Premier Division debut for Drogheda United on 14 March 2010, replacing Glen Fitzpatrick from the bench in the 84th minute of a 2–2 draw away to Louth rivals Dundalk at Oriel Park. He made 33 appearances in all competitions during his first season in senior football.

=== Monaghan United ===
Brennan trained with Dundalk during the pre-season of 2011, but instead opted to sign for League of Ireland First Division club Monaghan United for the season, where he would play alongside his brother Seán. On 22 April 2011, he scored the first senior goal of his career in a 2–1 win over Wexford Youths at Gortakeegan. On 14 October 2011, Brennan scored the crucial only goal of the game in his sides win away to Mervue United to help them secure a spot in the Playoffs with a third-place finish in the league. He followed that up by scoring in a 3–1 win in the Playoffs away to Galway United as his side won 5–1 on aggregate to secure a place in the League of Ireland Premier Division. He scored 8 goals in 29 appearances in all competitions during his season with the club.

=== Return to Drogheda United ===
In December 2011, it was announced that Brennan has rejoined Drogheda United alongside 2 of his brothers Gavin and Seán. He scored his first goal for the club at senior level on 30 March 2012 in a 2–0 win over Derry City at United Park. On 22 September 2012, Brennan played the full 2012 League of Ireland Cup final as his side defeated Shamrock Rovers 3–1 at Tallaght Stadium to claim the first silverware of his career, despite a Rovers goal from his brother Killian in the game. His first season back at the club was a success, with the side finishing in an unexpected 2nd place to secure UEFA Europa League football for the following season. On 11 May 2013, Brennan played the full 2013 Setanta Sports Cup final as his side were hammered 7–1 by Shamrock Rovers at Tallaght Stadium. On 4 July 2013, he made his first career European appearance, getting sent off for a second yellow card in the 75th minute of his side's credible 0–0 draw with Swedish club Malmö in the UEFA Europa League at Tallaght Stadium. On 3 November 2013, Brennan started the 2013 FAI Cup final at the Aviva Stadium, scoring a 92nd-minute equaliser before Sligo Rovers went on to score 2 minutes later to win 3–2 and claim the trophy. He made a career high of appearances in 2013, playing 46 times in all competitions, scoring 10 goals.

=== Shamrock Rovers ===
On 5 December 2013, he signed for Shamrock Rovers ahead of the 2014 season. He made his debut on 19 February 2014, in a 5–1 win over his old side Drogheda United in the Leinster Senior Cup. His first goal of the game came on 15 March 2014, when he scored the only goal of the game in a win over Sligo Rovers at Tallaght Stadium. On 26 October 2015, he featured in the final of the 2014–15 Leinster Senior Cup in which his side were beaten 3–1 by Dundalk at Oriel Park. He made a total of 71 appearances in his 2 seasons with the club, scoring 4 goals.

=== Bray Wanderers ===
In January 2016, Brennan made the move to Bray Wanderers for the year. He made his debut for the club on 20 February 2016, scoring twice in a 3–1 win over St Patrick's Athletic in the Leinster Senior Cup at the Carlisle Grounds. On 27 May 2016, he scored his first career Hat-trick, away to UCD in the FAI Cup but still managed to come out on the losing side of a 4–3 score line. On 21 November 2016, he signed a new 1-year contract with the club. He scored 15 goals in 60 appearances in all competitions during his 2 seasons in Bray.

=== St Patrick's Athletic ===
On 22 November 2017, Brennan signed for fellow League of Ireland Premier Division club St Patrick's Athletic for their 2018 season, joining his brother Killian at the club. He score 5 minutes into his debut on 4 February 2018 in a 3–1 win away to his old club Bray Wanderers in a Leinster Senior Cup tie at the Carlisle Grounds. On 3 August 2018, he scored again against his former club Bray Wanderers, this time in a 3–0 league win at Richmond Park. On 28 September 2018, he played in the final of the 2017–18 Leinster Senior Cup final and scored his penalty in the penalty shootout, as his side were defeated by Shelbourne at Tolka Park. He was let leave the club at the end of the season after making 35 appearances and scoring 5 goals for the club.

=== Shelbourne ===
On 3 December 2018, he signed for League of Ireland First Division club Shelbourne, ahead of their 2019 campaign. On 19 September 2019, he was part of the team that defeated his hometown club Drogheda United 3–1 at United Park to win the 2019 League of Ireland First Division title and promotion back to the Premier Division. He was voted into the PFAI First Division Team of the Year for 2019 by his fellow players in the league, being named in the midfield alongside his brother Sean. The return to the League of Ireland Premier Division did not go to plan for Brennan or Shelbourne however, as they were relegated back to the First Division on 15 November 2020 after losing 1–0 to Longford Town at Richmond Park. On 1 October 2021, he was part of the team that defeated Treaty United 1–0 at Tolka Park to claim the 2021 League of Ireland First Division title to yo-yo the club back up to the Premier Division. Brennan was voted into the PFAI First Division Team of the Year for 2021 by his fellow professionals, after his impressive season of 15 goals in 27 games as he fired his side to promotion. He departed the club on 15 November 2021 following the appointment of new manager Damien Duff.

=== Third Drogheda United spell ===
On 19 December 2021, Brennan returned to his hometown club Drogheda United for a third spell, ahead of their 2022 season. On 4 April 2022, he scored his first goal since returning to the club, in a 2–2 draw away to Finn Harps at Finn Park. On 21 July 2023, Brennan scored the winner in a 2–1 victory at home to Sligo Rovers to knock them out of the FAI Cup. On 16 December 2023, Brennan signed a new 1-year contract with the club. On 10 November 2024, Brennan captained the side in the 2024 FAI Cup final, lifting the cup after a 2–0 victory over Derry City at the Aviva Stadium. On 16 November 2024, he helped his side to a 3–1 win over Bray Wanderers at Tallaght Stadium in the 2024 League of Ireland Premier Division Promotion/Relegation Playoff. On 6 December 2024, he signed a new contract with the club. In October 2026, Brennan announced that he would be retiring from professional football at the end of the season after a 17 year career in the League of Ireland. On 7 November 2026 he made the final appearance of his career in a 2–1 defeat to UCD in the Promotion/Relegation Playoff as his club were relegated to the League of Ireland First Division.

== Personal life ==
Ryan Brennan has three older brothers that all played in the League of Ireland during their careers, Killian Brennan, Gavin Brennan and Seán Brennan, all of whom he played with during his career at multiple clubs.

== Career statistics ==
As of match played on 7 November 2026

Appearances and goals by club, season and competition
Club	Season	League			National Cup (Note: Includes FAI Cup)		League Cup (Note: Includes League of Ireland Cup)		Europe		Other		Total	
Club	Season	Division	Apps	Goals	Apps	Goals	Apps	Goals	Apps	Goals	Apps	Goals	Apps	Goals
Drogheda United	2010	LOI Premier Division	29	0	1	0	1	0	—		2 (Note: Appearance(s) in the Leinster Senior Cup)	0	33	0
Monaghan United	2011	LOI First Division	23	6	3	1	1	0	—		2 (Note: Appearances in the 2011 League of Ireland Promotion/Relegation Playoffs)	1	29	8
Drogheda United	2012	LOI Premier Division	24	3	3	0	4	0	—		0	0	31	3
Drogheda United	2013	LOI Premier Division	29	6	6	1	3	1	1 (Note: Appearance(s) in the UEFA Europa League)	0	7 (Note: Appearance(s) in the Setanta Sports Cup)	2	46	10
Drogheda United	Total		53	9	9	1	7	1	1	0	7	2	77	13
Shamrock Rovers	2014	LOI Premier Division	24	3	5	0	2	0	—		5 (Note: 2 appearances in the Leinster Senior Cup; 3 appearances in the Setanta Sports Cup)	0	36	3
Shamrock Rovers	2015	LOI Premier Division	25	1	1	0	3	0	3	0	3	0	35	1
Shamrock Rovers	Total		49	4	6	0	5	0	3	0	8	0	71	4
Bray Wanderers	2016	LOI Premier Division	22	1	1	3	2	1	—		1	2	26	7
Bray Wanderers	2017	LOI Premier Division	29	7	1	0	2	1	—		2 (Note: 1 appearance in the Leinster Senior Cup; 1 appearance in the Scottish Challenge Cup)	0	34	8
Bray Wanderers	Total		51	8	2	3	4	2	—		3	2	60	15
St Patrick's Athletic	2018	LOI Premier Division	34	4	2	0	0	0	–		3	1	39	5
Shelbourne	2019	LOI First Division	26	5	0	0	2	0	—		0	0	28	5
Shelbourne	2020	LOI Premier Division	16	3	2	1	—		—		1 (Note: Appearance in the League of Ireland Promotion/Relegation Play-off)	0	19	4
Shelbourne	2021	LOI First Division	27	15	1	0	—		—		—		28	15
Shelbourne	Total		69	23	3	1	2	0	—		1	0	75	24
Drogheda United	2022	LOI Premier Division	25	6	1	1	—		—		—		26	7
Drogheda United	2023	LOI Premier Division	29	4	3	2	—		—		1	0	33	6
Drogheda United	2024	LOI Premier Division	33	0	5	2	—		—		3 (Note: 1 appearance in the 2024 League of Ireland Premier Division Promotion/Relegation Playoff; 2 appearances in the Leinster Senior Cup)	0	41	2
Drogheda United	2025	LOI Premier Division	34	2	3	0	—		—		2 (Note: 1 appearance in the President of Ireland's Cup; 1 appearance in the Leinster Senior Cup)	0	39	2
Drogheda United	2026	LOI Premier Division	26	2	1	0	—		—		3 (Note: 1 appearance in the 2026 League of Ireland play-offs; 2 appearances, 1 goal in the Leinster Senior Cup)	1	30	3
Drogheda United	Total		147	14	13	5	—		—		9	1	169	20
Career Total			455	68	39	11	20	3	4	0	35	7	553	89

== Honours ==
=== Club ===
Drogheda United

- League of Ireland Cup: 2012
- FAI Cup: 2024

Shelbourne

- League of Ireland First Division: 2019, 2021

=== Individual ===
- PFAI First Division Player of the Year: 2021
- PFAI First Division Team of the Year: 2021
