= 2012 League of Ireland Cup =

EA Sports Cup

Tournament details
- Country: Republic of Ireland; Northern Ireland
- Teams: 22

Final positions
- Champions: Drogheda United
- Runners-up: Shamrock Rovers

The 2012 League of Ireland Cup, also known as the 2012 EA Sports Cup, is the 39th season of the Irish football knockout competition.

A total of 22 teams entered the 2012 competition. The 12 League of Ireland Premier Division and 8 League of Ireland First Division clubs were joined by Ulster Senior League champions Fanad United and the Mayo League representative side. For the First and Second Rounds of the competition, all participating clubs were split into 4 regional pools with the further rounds of the competition having an open draw. The 2012 competition commenced with the First Round on 26 March 2012.

== Teams ==
Pool 1	Pool 2	Pool 3	Pool 4
Cork City; Limerick; St. Patrick's Athletic; UCD; Waterford United; Wexford Youths	Derry City; Fanad United; Finn Harps; Mayo League; Monaghan United; Sligo Rovers	Bray Wanderers; Mervue United; SD Galway; Shamrock Rovers; Shelbourne	Athlone Town; Bohemians; Drogheda United; Dundalk; Longford Town

== First round ==
The draw for the First Round took place on 7 March 2012. The First Round games were played on 26 March 2012.

Team 1	Score	Team 2	
Pool 1
Cork City	5 − 1	Wexford Youths	Report
Waterford United	1 − 6	UCD	Report
Pool 2
Finn Harps	2 − 0	Mayo League	Report
Monaghan United	2 − 1	Fanad United	Report
Pool 3
Shelbourne	1 − 0	Mervue United	Report
Pool 4
Athlone Town	2 − 5	Drogheda United	Report

== Second round ==
The draw for the Second Round took place on 27 March 2012. The Second Round games were played on 9/10 April 2012.

Team 1	Score	Team 2	
Pool 1
Limerick	3 − 0	Cork City	Report
St Patrick's Athletic	2 − 1	UCD	Report
Pool 2
Derry City	4 − 0	Finn Harps	Report
Sligo Rovers	3 − 1	Monaghan United	Report
Pool 3
SD Galway	0 − 2	Shamrock Rovers	Report
Shelbourne	1 − 2 aet	Bray Wanderers	Report
Pool 4
Drogheda United	1 − 1 aet 4−3 pen.	Bohemians	Report
Longford Town	1 − 2	Dundalk	Report

== Quarterfinals ==
The draw for the quarter-finals was made on 7 May 2012 on MNS on RTÉ Two. The quarterfinal games were played on 25/26 June 2012.

25 June 2012	Drogheda United	1 − 1 (3 − 2 p)	Dundalk	Hunky Dorys Park
19:45	Foley 33'	Report	54' Griffin	Referee: Derek Tomney
	Penalties
	Foley (penalty scored); R. Brennan (penalty scored); Hynes (penalty missed); Marshall (penalty missed); G. Brennan (penalty scored)		(penalty missed) Mountney; (penalty missed) O'Neill; (penalty scored) Shields; (penalty scored) Walsh; (penalty missed) Griffin

25 June 2012	Bray Wanderers	1 − 3	Limerick	Carlisle Grounds
19:45	Byrne 55' (pen.)	Report	12', 16' Coughlan; 21' Sheahan	Referee: Paul Tuite

26 June 2012	Sligo Rovers	4 − 0	Derry City	The Showgrounds
19:45	Cretaro 50', 82'; North 79', 85'	Report		Attendance: 1,430; Referee: Rob Rogers

26 June 2012	St Patrick's Athletic	1 − 1 (2 − 4 p)	Shamrock Rovers	Richmond Park
19:45	S. O'Connor 27'	Report	7' Brennan	Attendance: 1,091; Referee: Damien Hancock
	Penalties
	S. O'Connor (penalty scored); Russell (penalty scored); Chambers (penalty missed); Daly (penalty missed)		(penalty scored) McCabe; (penalty scored) O'Donnell; (penalty scored) Twigg; (penalty missed) Greene; (penalty scored) McCormack

== Semi finals ==
The draw for the semi-finals was made on MNS on 9 July 2012.

6 August 2012	Drogheda United	2 − 1	Sligo Rovers	Hunky Dorys Park
15:00	G. Brennan 26'; Mulvenna 29'	Report	60' Lynch	Referee: Padraigh Sutton

6 August 2012	Shamrock Rovers	4 − 1	Limerick	Tallaght Stadium
19:00	Gannon 23'; Kilduff 66', 78'; Dennehy 90+2'	Report	87' Judge	Attendance: 1,200; Referee: Paul Tuite

== Final ==
The final will be played on Saturday, 22 September 2012 in Tallaght Stadium, Dublin.

22 September 2012
17:45

Drogheda United	3 − 1	Shamrock Rovers
O'Brien 33'; Gilbert 43' (o.g.); Foley 61'; Hynes (yellow card) 21'; McNally (yellow card) 73'; Prendergast (yellow card) 83'	Report	Brennan 59'; Kilduff (yellow card) 23'; Powell (red card) 72'

Tallaght Stadium, Dublin
Referee: Tom Connolly
