= Killian Brennan =

Irish footballer (born 1984)

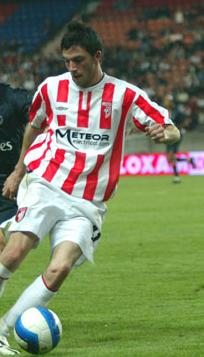
- Brennan in action against PSG at Parc des Princes

Personal information
- Date of birth: 31 January 1984 (age 42)
- Place of birth: Drogheda, Ireland
- Position: Midfielder

Youth career
- 1992–2000: Drogheda Boys
- 2000–2002: Home Farm
- 2002–2003: Peterborough United

Senior career*
| Years | Team | Apps | (Gls) |
| 2004 | Dublin City | 16 | (1) |
| 2004–2007 | Derry City | 87 | (8) |
| 2008–2011 | Bohemians | 122 | (28) |
| 2012 | Shamrock Rovers | 24 | (2) |
| 2013–2015 | St Patrick's Athletic | 77 | (14) |
| 2016 | Shamrock Rovers | 19 | (1) |
| 2017 | Drogheda United | 6 | (0) |
| 2017–2018 | St Patrick's Athletic | 26 | (2) |
| Total | | 377 | (56) |

International career
| 2000 | Republic of Ireland U16 | 2 | (0) |
| 2002 | Republic of Ireland U17 | 2 | (0) |
| 2004 | Republic of Ireland U19 | 3 | (0) |
| 2004 | Republic of Ireland U21 | 1 | (0) |
| 2010 | League of Ireland XI | 1 | (0) |
Medal record
Derry City
| Winner | League of Ireland Cup | 2005 |
| Winner | League of Ireland Cup | 2006 |
| Runner-up | League of Ireland | 2006 |
| Winner | FAI Cup | 2006 |
| Winner | League of Ireland Cup | 2007 |
Bohemians
| Winner | League of Ireland | 2008 |
| Winner | FAI Cup | 2008 |
| Winner | League of Ireland Cup | 2009 |
| Winner | League of Ireland | 2009 |
| Winner | Setanta Sports Cup | 2010 |
| Runner-up | League of Ireland | 2010 |
| Runner-up | Leinster Senior Cup | 2011 |
Shamrock Rovers
| Runner-up | League of Ireland Cup | 2012 |
| Winner | Leinster Senior Cup | 2012 |
St Patrick's Athletic
| Winner | League of Ireland | 2013 |
| Runner-up | Leinster Senior Cup | 2013 |
| Winner | FAI President's Cup | 2014 |
| Winner | Leinster Senior Cup | 2014 |
| Winner | FAI Cup | 2014 |
| Runner-up | FAI President's Cup | 2015 |
| Winner | League of Ireland Cup | 2015 |
Individual
| Winner | League of Ireland Player of the Month | May 2008 |
| Winner | PFAI Team of the Year | 2008 |
| Runner-up | PFAI Players' Player of the Year | 2008 |
| Winner | League of Ireland Player of the Month | May 2013 |
| Winner | PFAI Team of the Year | 2013 |
| Winner | PFAI Players' Player of the Year | 2013 |
| Winner | FAI National League Player of the Year | 2013 |
- * Club domestic league appearances and goals

Killian Brennan (born 31 January 1984) is an Irish retired footballer who played as a midfielder in the League of Ireland Premier Division.

== Career ==
=== Early career ===
Noted for his wing play and ability to fire in accurate crosses, Brennan was signed by Peterborough United in his teenage years. In 2004, he was capped several times for the Republic of Ireland under-19s, before moving back to play in the League of Ireland.

He was signed by John Gill for Dublin City, however, halfway through the 2004 season, newly appointed boss Roddy Collins' 'purge' of the club meant that Brennan was deemed surplus to requirements. He was immediately snapped up by Stephen Kenny for Derry City for the remainder of the 2004 season, the player was a revelation and made the left wing spot at The Brandywell his own after having made his debut away to his former club Dublin City on 12 August 2004. He has also been deployed to fill in at left full-back on occasion. In the 2006 season he played in their UEFA Cup run in wins over IFK Göteborg and Gretna FC and helped Derry to the FAI Cup and League of Ireland Cup.

It is this talent that attracted the attention of his hometown club, Drogheda United who declared their interest in Brennan following the end of the 2006 season. However, it was Bohs who captured his signature, signing the winger on a free transfer.

=== Bohemians ===
Brennan scored his debut goals for his new club in United Park versus his hometown club, netting a freekick and a penalty in a 2–1 win for Bohs. He continued his good form netting 5 times in May 2008 and this did not go unnoticed as he was awarded Soccer Writers' Association of Ireland Player of the month for May. Killian's goals helped Bohs blow away the competition as they marched to the 2008 League of Ireland title and his form was rewarded when he was voted on to the League of Ireland Premier Division Team for 2008, receiving a staggering 86% of the votes for the left midfield position.

He scored against Rhyl F.C. in the 2008 UEFA Intertoto Cup.

Brennan helped Bohs to the 2009 League of Ireland Cup against Waterford United by scoring a freekick and a penalty as Bohs went on to win the match 3–1. He then scored again on 20 October as Bohs beat St. Patrick's Athletic to put them on top of the table and that's where they finished as Bohemians won their first ever back-to-back league wins.

Despite winning the Setanta Sports Cup, Bohemians had a disappointing 2010 season where the club lost their league title on goal difference and failed to make an impact in Europe where they made an embarrassing exit to Welsh side The New Saints. Killian did however net the winner in the first leg of that European tie. Due to financial difficulties Brennan was released when his contract expired at the end of the 2010 season. However, he was then resigned to play for Bohs for the 2011 season.

On 27 July 2011, Brennan was a part of the starting XI for Coventry City's pre-season game against local non-league side Leamington. It is understood Brennan was on a trial basis at the club.

On 14 January 2012 Brennan signed for League of Ireland Champions Shamrock Rovers. After a poor season by Rovers which saw them finish with no silverware and outside of the European spots, Brennan decided to move on after just one season.

=== St Patrick's Athletic ===
On 19 November, Brennan signed for St Patrick's Athletic. The signing was announced by the club's Head of Player Recruitment, Dave Campbell on the club's own radio show, The All Saints Show, on West Dublin Access Radio. His signing was officially announced on the club's website the next day. Brennan started off life at his new club brilliantly, getting the Man of the Match award in a 0–0 draw at home to Glentoran live on Setanta Sports. His performances away to Glentoran and at home to Drogheda United in the league opener stood out from the rest with his excellent ability to begin attacks. Brennan's first goal for the Saints came when he scored the winner from a penalty away to Limerick at Thomond Park on 30 March 2013. Brennan's second goal for the club came on 19 April 2913 when Pats faced Sligo Rovers at Richmond Park live on RTÉ, he chipped a cheeky penalty down the centre in the 89th minute as Pats won 2–0 and Brennan was awarded the Man of the Match award. On his return to his hometown, he scored a 92nd-minute winner from the penalty spot in a 2–1 win over Drogheda United on 6 May 2013. Brennan came back to haunt his old club Bohemians, when he blasted a penalty into the top corner to seal a 2–0 win for Pats putting them top of the league on 24 May 2013 at Dalymount Park.

== Career statistics ==
As of match played 26 October 2018

Appearances and goals by club, season and competition
| Club | Season | League | | | National cup (Note: Includes FAI Cup) | | League cup (Note: Includes League of Ireland Cup) | | Europe | | Other | | Total | |
| Club | Season | Division | Apps | Goals | Apps | Goals | Apps | Goals | Apps | Goals | Apps | Goals | Apps | Goals |
|---|---|---|---|---|---|---|---|---|---|---|---|---|---|---|
| Dublin City | 2003 | LOI Premier Division | 16 | 1 | – | | 0 | 0 | – | | – | | 16 | 1 |
| Derry City | 2004 | LOI Premier Division | 10 | 0 | 3 | 0 | – | | – | | – | | 13 | 0 |
| Derry City | 2005 | LOI Premier Division | 29 | 5 | 4 | 0 | 2 | 0 | – | | – | | 35 | 5 |
| Derry City | 2006 | LOI Premier Division | 22 | 2 | 3 | 0 | 3 | 0 | 3 (Note: Appearances in the UEFA Cup) | 0 | 3 (Note: Appearance(s) in the Setanta Sports Cup) | 0 | 34 | 2 |
| Derry City | 2007 | LOI Premier Division | 26 | 1 | 3 | 0 | 2 | 0 | 1 (Note: Appearance(s) in the UEFA Champions League) | 0 | 4 | 1 | 36 | 2 |
| Derry City | Total | | 87 | 8 | 13 | 0 | 7 | 0 | 4 | 0 | 7 | 1 | 118 | 9 |
| Bohemians | 2008 | LOI Premier Division | 27 | 11 | 4 | 1 | 0 | 0 | 3 (Note: Appearances in the UEFA Intertoto Cup) | 2 | – | | 34 | 14 |
| Bohemians | 2009 | LOI Premier Division | 34 | 7 | 4 | 0 | 3 | 2 | 2 | 0 | 2 | 0 | 45 | 9 |
| Bohemians | 2010 | LOI Premier Division | 29 | 4 | 4 | 0 | 1 | 0 | 2 | 1 | 5 | 0 | 41 | 5 |
| Bohemians | 2011 | LOI Premier Division | 32 | 6 | 4 | 1 | 0 | 0 | 2 (Note: Appearance(s) in the UEFA Europa League) | 0 | 1 | 0 | 35 | 6 |
| Bohemians | Total | | 122 | 28 | 16 | 2 | 4 | 2 | 9 | 3 | 8 | 0 | 129 | 28 |
| Shamrock Rovers | 2012 | LOI Premier Division | 24 | 2 | 2 | 0 | 4 | 2 | 2 | 0 | 3 (Note: 2 appearances in the Setanta Sports Cup; 1 appearance, 1 goal in the Leinster Senior Cup) | 1 | 35 | 5 |
| St Patrick's Athletic | 2013 | LOI Premier Division | 28 | 8 | 3 | 1 | 1 | 0 | 2 | 1 | 2 | 0 | 35 | 10 |
| St Patrick's Athletic | 2014 | LOI Premier Division | 24 | 1 | 6 | 3 | 1 | 1 | 2 | 0 | 3 (Note: 1 appearance in the President of Ireland's Cup; 2 appearances in the Leinster Senior Cup) | 0 | 36 | 5 |
| St Patrick's Athletic | 2015 | LOI Premier Division | 25 | 5 | 2 | 0 | 2 | 0 | 2 | 0 | 2 (Note: 1 appearance in the President of Ireland's Cup; 1 appearance, 1 goal in the Leinster Senior Cup) | 1 | 33 | 6 |
| St Patrick's Athletic | Total | | 77 | 14 | 11 | 4 | 4 | 1 | 6 | 1 | 7 | 1 | 105 | 21 |
| Shamrock Rovers | 2016 | LOI Premier Division | 19 | 1 | 2 | 0 | 0 | 0 | 2 | 0 | 0 (Note: Appearance(s) in the Leinster Senior Cup) | 0 | 23 | 1 |
| Drogheda United | 2017 | LOI Premier Division | 6 | 0 | – | | 0 | 0 | – | | 0 | 0 | 6 | 0 |
| St Patrick's Athletic | 2017 | LOI Premier Division | 11 | 1 | 2 | 0 | – | | – | | 0 | 0 | 13 | 1 |
| St Patrick's Athletic | 2018 | LOI Premier Division | 15 | 1 | 2 | 0 | 0 | 0 | — | | 0 | 0 | 17 | 1 |
| St Patrick's Athletic | Total | | 26 | 2 | 4 | 0 | 0 | 0 | — | | 0 | 0 | 30 | 2 |
| Career total | | | 377 | 56 | 48 | 6 | 19 | 5 | 23 | 4 | 25 | 3 | 492 | 74 |

== Personal life ==
Killian has three brothers all whom played in the League of Ireland, Ryan who plays for Drogheda United, Gavin who last played for Warrenpoint Town and Sean who last played for Drogheda United.

== Honours ==
Derry City

- FAI Cup: 2006
- League of Ireland Cup: 2005, 2006, 2007

Bohemians

- League of Ireland Premier Division: 2008, 2009
- FAI Cup: 2008
- League of Ireland Cup: 2009
- Setanta Sports Cup: 2009–10

Shamrock Rovers

- Leinster Senior Cup: 2012

St Patrick's Athletic

- League of Ireland Premier Division: 2013
- FAI Cup: 2014
- League of Ireland Cup: 2015
- FAI President's Cup: 2014
- Leinster Senior Cup: 2014

Individual

- PFAI Players' Player of the Year: 2013
- League of Ireland Player of the Month: May 2008, May 2013
- PFAI Team of the Year: 2008, 2013
- FAI National League Player of the Year: 2013
