= 2013 FAI Cup final =

- Event: 2013 FAI Cup
Drogheda United	Sligo Rovers
2	3
- Date: 3 November 2013
- Venue: Aviva Stadium, Dublin
- Man of the Match: Danny North
- Referee: Paul Tuite
- Attendance: 17,573

The 2013 FAI Cup final was the final match of the 2013 FAI Cup, the national association football cup of the Republic of Ireland. The match took place on 3 November 2013 at the Aviva Stadium in Dublin. Drogheda United and Sligo Rovers contested the match.

The match was shown live on RTÉ Two and RTÉ Two HD in Ireland and was refereed by Paul Tuite, assisted by Damien MacGraith and Michelle O’Neill with Derek Tomney as Fourth Official. The Referee Observer was John Duffy.

Sligo Rovers won the cup for the third time in four years. Rovers substitute Danny North proved the difference between the sides with two goals in the last 15 minutes and assisted in a third for Anthony Elding to win it deep in injury time.

The match was preceded by the 2013 FAI Women's Cup Final, in which Raheny United defeated Castlebar Celtic after extra time.

== Match ==
3 November 2013
15:30 GMT

Drogheda United	2 - 3	Sligo Rovers
P. O'Conor 13'; R. Brennan 90+2'	Report	D. North 78', 85'; A. Elding 90+4'

Aviva Stadium
Attendance: 17,573
Referee: Paul Tuite

Drogheda United	Sligo Rovers

GK	16	(Republic of Ireland) Micheál Schlingermann
RB	20	(Republic of Ireland) Michael Daly
CB	28	(Republic of Ireland) Alan Byrne	(yellow card) 72'	(substituted off) 90'
CB	4	(Republic of Ireland) Derek Prendergast (c)	(yellow card) 83' (yellow-red card) 86'
CB	5	(Republic of Ireland) Alan McNally
LB	12	(Republic of Ireland) Shane Grimes
RM	8	(Republic of Ireland) Ryan Brennan	90+2'
CM	15	(Republic of Ireland) David Cassidy	(yellow card) 45+3'	(substituted off) 90+3'
CM	6	(Republic of Ireland) Paul O’Conor	13'	(substituted off) 77'
LM	11	(Republic of Ireland) Gavin Brennan	(yellow card) 67'
ST	9	(Republic of Ireland) Declan O’Brien	(yellow card) 69'
Substitutes:
GK	1	(Italy) Gabriel Sava
LB	3	(Republic of Ireland) Philip Hand
RM	7	(Republic of Ireland) Cathal Brady
ST	9	(Republic of Ireland) Peter Hynes	(substituted on) 90'
ST	14	(Republic of Ireland) Graham Rusk	(substituted on) 77'
CM	22	(Republic of Ireland) Eric Foley
LM	23	(Republic of Ireland) Jason Marks
Manager:
(Republic of Ireland) Mick Cooke

GK	1	(Republic of Ireland) Gary Rogers
RB	2	(Republic of Ireland) Alan Keane
CB	4	(Republic of Ireland) Gavin Peers
CB	6	(England) Jeff Henderson	(substituted off) 65'
LB	3	(Republic of Ireland) Iarfhlaith Davoren
RM	10	(Republic of Ireland) Raffaele Cretaro	(substituted off) 70'
CM	23	(England) Danny Ventre (c)	(yellow card) 84'
CM	15	(Cameroon) Joseph Ndo
LM	21	(England) Kieran Djilali
ST	20	(Republic of Ireland) Aaron Greene	(substituted off) 84'
ST	9	(England) Anthony Elding	90+4'
Substitutes:
CB	5	(Republic of Ireland) Evan McMillan	(substituted on) 65'	(yellow card) 71'
ST	7	(England) Danny North	(substituted on) 70'	78', 85'
CM	8	(Republic of Ireland) David Cawley
LM	11	(Republic of Ireland) Ross Gaynor	(substituted on) 84'
AM	16	(Republic of Ireland) Lee Lynch
GK	19	(Republic of Ireland) Ciarán Kelly
CM	29	(Republic of Ireland) Seamus Conneely
Manager:
(England) Ian Baraclough
