= Clonmel Celtic F.C. =

Irish association football club

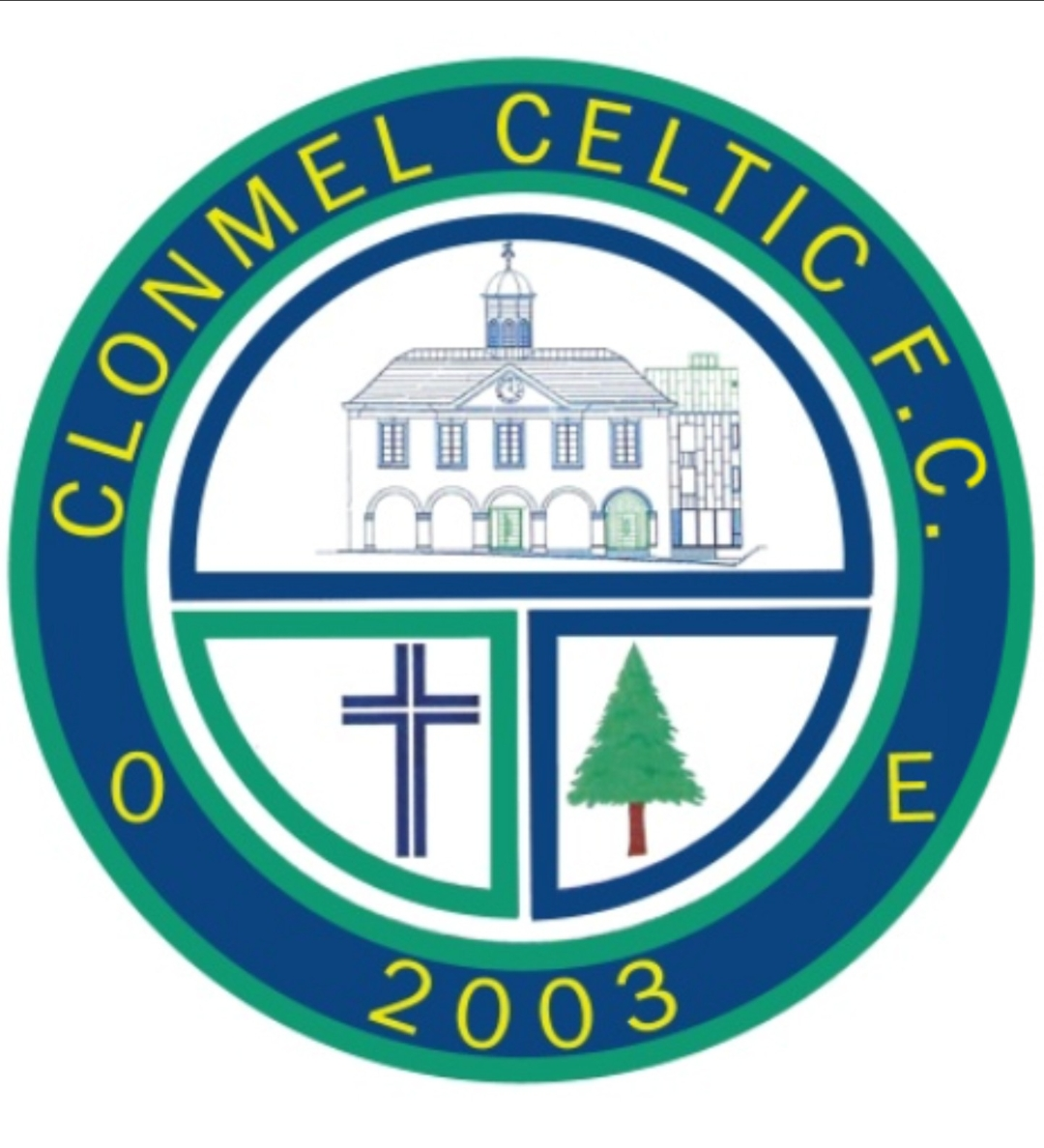
- Full name: Clonmel Celtic Football Club
- Founded: 2003
- Ground: Celtic Park
- Chairman: Michael Kiely
- Manager: Kenny O'Shea
- League: Tipperary Southern & District Football League
- Website: www.clonmelcelticfc.com
Home colours	Away colours

Clonmel Celtic F.C. are an Irish association football club from Clonmel in Ireland. The club's senior men's team competes in the Tipperary Southern & District Football League (TSDL). They qualified for the FAI Cup in 2012 and 2015.

The club colours are green shirts, white shorts and green socks. The club plays their home games at Celtic Park.

In the 2014–15 season, the club made it to the semi-finals of the FAI Junior Cup. This achievement meant they automatically qualified to compete in the FAI Cup. They entered the draw for the 2015 FAI Cup in the first round, losing to Cobh Wanderers 0–2.

== History ==
Clonmel Celtic was formed in July 2003, after a merger between Clonmel Evergreen and St. Oliver's Boys.

St. Oliver's Boys had itself been created out of many mergers, starting with the amalgamation of Clonmel Rangers and Elm Park United in 1977. These two clubs combined to form Elm Park Rangers. In the early 1990s, the club name was changed to St. Oliver's and developed a reputation for producing talented youth players. However, the club failed to seriously challenge for trophies in South Tipperary's top division. In 1984 a separate football club, called St. Martin's, was established and by the 1990s were interested in getting involved with schoolboy and youth football. So, in 1998, St. Oliver's merged with St. Martin's to create St. Oliver's Boys. Despite the club not having their own playing facilities, St. Oliver's Boys finished league runners-up in 2002.

Clonmel Evergreen F.C. was founded in 1978. The club quickly established themselves, gaining two successive promotions, and by the 1981–82 season were competing in South Tipperary's top division. They won the Tipperary Cup in 1981 and 1982 and added the First Division Cup in 2001. Although this helped them gain a reputation as cup specialists, the top division eluded them and in July 2003 they merged with St. Oliver's Boys to form Clonmel Celtic.

In 2004, one year after the merger, Clonmel Celtic's youth team won the Munster Youth Cup. In 2012, Clonmel qualified for the FAI Cup. The 2014–15 season brought the club's first ever league and cup double, with Celtic winning both the Premier Division title and the Tipperary Cup. The club also made it to the semi-finals of the FAI Junior Cup where they were eliminated by Sheriff YC.

== Honours ==
TSDL Premier League

- Winners: 2012–13, 2014–15

Munster Champions League Trophy

- Winners: 2013

Tipperary Cup

- Winners (3): 2008–2009, 2009–2010, 2014–2015
