= Drogheda Stadium =

Proposed soccer stadium in Ireland

The Drogheda Stadium (tentative name) was a proposed football stadium which was projected to be built in Drogheda, County Louth, Ireland. It was intended to replace United Park as the home stadium of Drogheda United F.C. The project had a proposed opening date of 2010, however planning was not secured. Plans were resurrected in 2012 and an agreement for a new stadium was concluded, between the Football Association of Ireland (FAI) and Louth County Council, in 2018.

== Original plan ==
Plans for a new stadium for Drogheda United came about in 2008 after they qualified for the UEFA Champions League. In 2009, they made plans for a new €35 million, 10,000 capacity stadium in Bryanstown, County Meath. Meath County Council approved the plans. However, due to controversy over the plans as they were on an area set-aside from redevelopment, the Irish government's Department of the Environment investigated the county for their decision and audited their planning rules.

== Later proposals ==
In 2012, updated proposals were made for a new Drogheda Stadium. This proposal expected a 3,500 capacity stadium that would be expandable to 8,000. United Park would be demolished and become a local care facility. The plans involved the new stadium being a community stadium with hopes it would be able to host Republic of Ireland youth internationals. In 2018, an agreement was made between the Football Association of Ireland and Louth County Council to construct a new Drogheda Stadium. Development was delayed due to the FAI struggling to find a buyer for United Park which they had priced at €2.5 million. The Government of the Republic of Ireland offered no funding for the new stadium, which Drogheda United had been hoping for as they felt they could not proceed with the project without public funds. As of late 2020, an article in Extra.ie described the plans as "[apparently] mothballing".
