= Gavin Brennan =

Irish association footballer

Personal information
- Place of birth: Drogheda, Ireland
- Position: Forward

Youth career
- 1995–2004: Drogheda Boys
- 2005: Drogheda United Reserves

Senior career*
Years	Team	Apps	(Gls)
2008–2009	Duleek F.C		
2010	Drogheda Town		
2011–2014	Drogheda United	91	(20)
2015–2016	Shamrock Rovers	44	(4)
2017	Drogheda United	13	(1)
2018	Boyne Harps	0	(0)
2018	Warrenpoint Town	2	(0)
- * Club domestic league appearances and goals

Gavin Brennan is an Irish retired footballer who played as a midfielder for clubs in the League of Ireland and NIFL Premiership.

== Playing career ==
Brennan signed with Drogheda United in June 2011. While playing with Drogheda, he was voted "Supporters Player of the Year" on two occasions, and captained the side several times during the 2014 season.

In 2015 he moved from Drogheda to Shamrock Rovers, and played for the club during the 2015 League of Ireland Premier Division season. He scored against Odds BK during the 2015 Europa League qualifying round. His contract with Shamrock Rovers was "terminated by mutual agreement" following a "social media outburst" in 2016. In late 2016, he returned to Drogheda United.

After a short spell with Boyne Harps, he joined Warrenpoint Town in 2018.

== Personal life ==
He has a brother Killian Brennan who previously played for St Patrick's Athletic, a brother Seán who previously played for Drogheda United and a brother Ryan Brennan who has played for Monaghan United.
