= Peter Hynes (footballer) =

Irish footballer

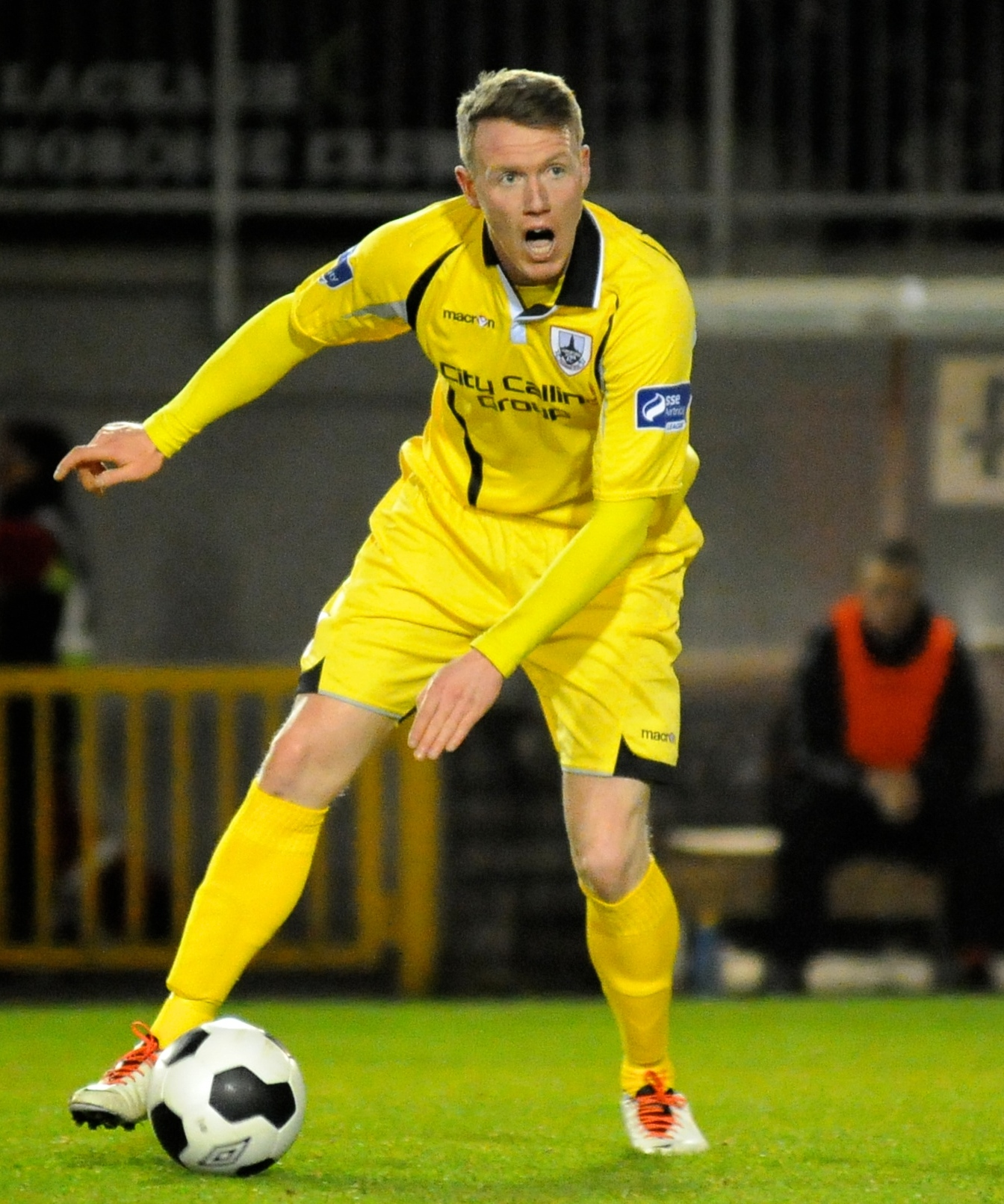
- Peter Hynes in action for Longford Town in a 0-1 win against Galway F.C. in the League of Ireland First Division in March 2014

Personal information
- Date of birth: 28 November 1983 (age 42)
- Place of birth: Dublin, Ireland
- Position: Forward

Youth career
- Cherry Orchard
- 2001–2002: Aston Villa

Senior career*
Years	Team	Apps	(Gls)
2002–2004	Aston Villa	0	(0)
2003–2004	→ Doncaster Rovers (loan)	5	(1)
2004	→ Cheltenham Town (loan)	4	(0)
2004	Tamworth	0	(0)
2004	Dublin City	8	(1)
2005–2006	Dundalk	68	(16)
2007	Newry City	6	(2)
2007	Derry City	13	(1)
2007	→ UCD (loan)	8	(0)
2008	Sporting Fingal	33	(8)
2009	Shelbourne	28	(5)
2010	Longford Town	28	(6)
2011	Limerick	18	(1)
2012–2013	Drogheda United	51	(9)
2014	Longford Town	25	(1)
Total		267	(51)
- * Club domestic league appearances and goals

Peter Hynes (born 28 November 1983) is an Irish footballer.

== Playing career ==
=== English career ===
Hynes began his career as a trainee with Aston Villa where he played in Villa's 2002 FA Youth Cup winning side and turned professional in November 2000. In need of first-team experience, he joined Doncaster Rovers on loan in December 2003, making his league debut on 13 December 2003 when he came on as a late substitute for Gregg Blundell in Rovers' 3–1 defeat away to Cheltenham Town. He played in four further games for Rovers, all as a substitute, with his only goal coming in his final game, a 5–0 win at home to Leyton Orient on 10 January 2004.

Later that month he joined Cheltenham Town on a month's loan, playing four times before returning to Villa. He was released at the end of the season, joining Conference side Tamworth in June 2004 but left in July without playing a single game for the Lambs.

=== Irish career ===
Hynes joined Dublin City as John Gill's last signing before relinquishing managerial duties at Dublin City and was deployed primarily as a striker by Gill's successors Roddy Collins and Dermot Keely.

Hynes scored the late winner which consummated Dublin City's memorable reversal of a 0–2 deficit into a 3–2 victory away to Derry City late in the 2004 season.

In contrast to his uninspired form with Dublin City, Hynes proved markedly more productive in the colours of Dundalk, whom he joined in 2005, scoring six goals from midfield in 2005. He formed, alongside Philip Hughes (with whom he played at Dublin City) one half of a prolific forward pairing which manoeuvred Dundalk into a strong position in the League of Ireland First Division. However, he was released by Dundalk following a breach of club discipline on 14 November 2006.

In January 2007 he joined Newry City, but just over a month later on 28 February (the transfer deadline day for League of Ireland clubs), he signed for Derry City. The clubs agreed that Hynes would move for free but the agreement also contained a clause which would allow his former club to claim 30% of any future transfer fee if the player was to be sold on.

However, Hynes was not initially eligible to play for Derry City as FIFA's rules stated that no player could play for more than two different clubs between 1 July of one season and 30 June of the following year. In Hynes' case, he had already played for both Dundalk and Newry City between 1 July 2006 and his signing for Derry City in February 2007. The Football Association of Ireland argued that, as they ran a league with an unconventional Summer season, such a state of affairs ought to be permissible for players playing in the League of Ireland. With two weeks of the league season completed the association had yet to come to an agreement with FIFA. The player's clearance eventually came on 5 April.

When Hynes was finally granted eligibility to play for Derry he struggled to make an impact with the candystripes. He was loaned out during the July transfer window to UCD for whom he made 8 appearances. Hynes parted ways with Derry City at the end of the 2007 season to join new League of Ireland franchise Sporting Fingal who were making their debut in the 2008 First Division. Hynes was a regular figure in the Sporting Fingal squad where he formed a successful partnership with Robbie Doyle. In all competitions Hynes contributed 11 goals in 38 games alongside numerous assists for the new league outfit as they finished 3rd in the First Division. Hynes fell out of favour towards the end of the season with Sporting and could not agree a contract for the 2009 season. He did not wait long to find a new club as he signed for Shelbourne on 23 December 2008. Hynes made his Shelbourne debut on 6 March 2009 during a 2–1 victory over Wexford Youths at Tolka Park. On 13 April 2009, he scored his first Shelbourne goal during a League of Ireland Cup first-round tie against his former club Dundalk at Tolka Park, a match Shelbourne won 3–0. Hynes finished the 2009 season as a First Division runner-up with Shelbourne and scored 6 goals in 33 league and cup appearances over the course of the season for Shels. He departed Shelbourne at the end of the season and he signed for Longford Town on 11 January 2010 and spent one season with the midlands club.

On 14 January 2011, it was confirmed that Hynes would be signing for Limerick.

On 14 December 2011, Hynes signed for Drogheda United where he spent two seasons. The highlight of this time was being part of the victorious League of Ireland Cup winning team of 2012.

On 29 November 2013, Hynes re-joined Longford Town. He was a member of the League of Ireland First Division 2014 title-winning squad, although his role was limited mainly to substitute appearances. He was released at the end of the season.
