= United Park =

Football stadium in Drogheda, Ireland

Coordinates: 53°43′24″N 06°21′26″W

- Sullivan and Lambe Park
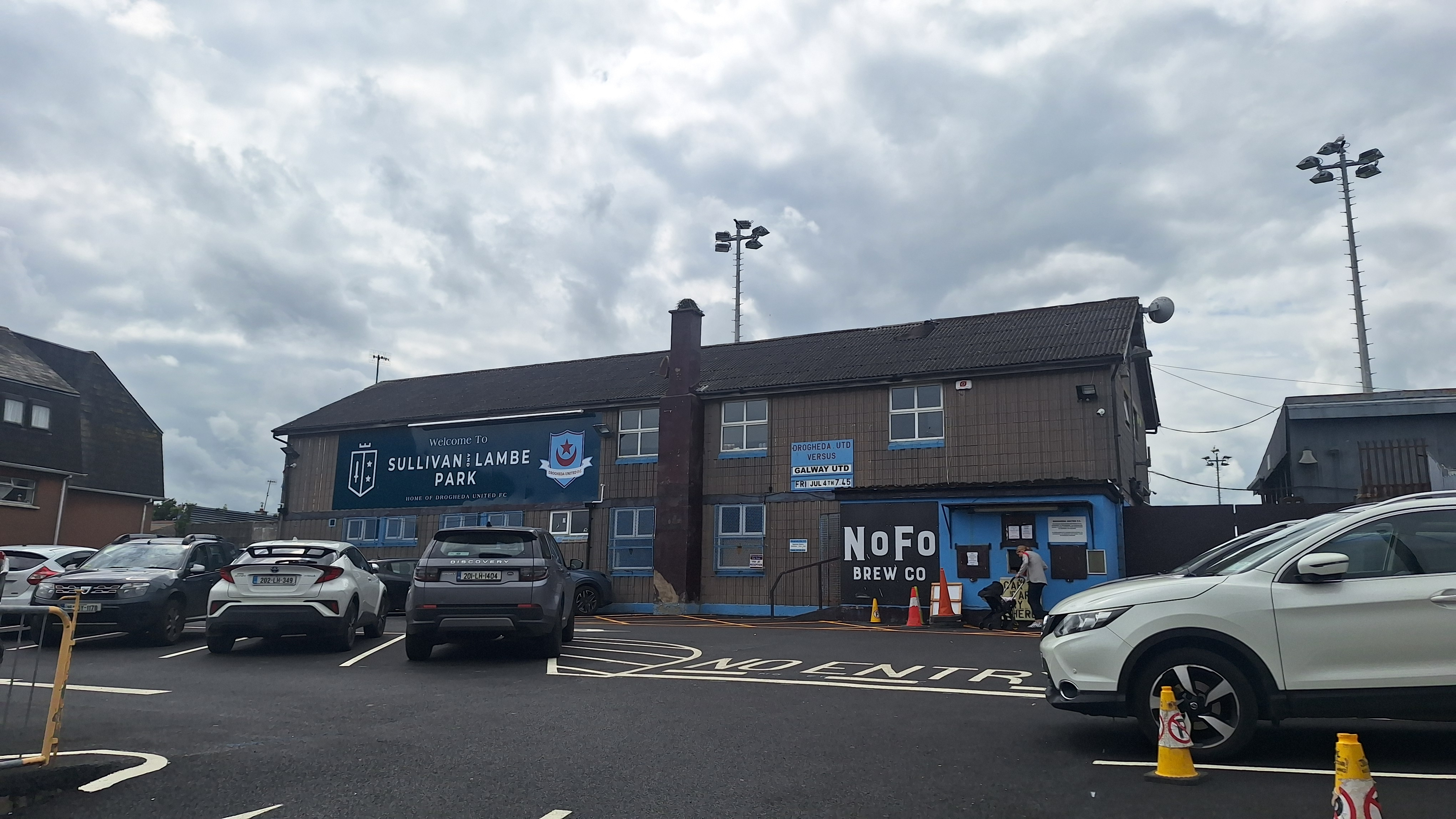
- Interactive map of United Park
- Full name: United Park
- Former names: O_{2} Park (2002–03); Hunky Dorys Park (2010–14); Head in the Game Park (2021–22); Weavers Park (2023–24)
- Location: Drogheda, County Louth
- Capacity: 3,500 (1,500 seated)
- Surface: Grass
- Scoreboard: Yes
- Field size: 99 m × 64 m (108 yd × 70 yd)
- Public transit: Drogheda MacBride; Cross Lane (Bus Éireann routes D4, D5)

Construction
- Opened: 1927
- Renovated: 1979, 2010

Tenant
- Drogheda United F.C. (1979–present)

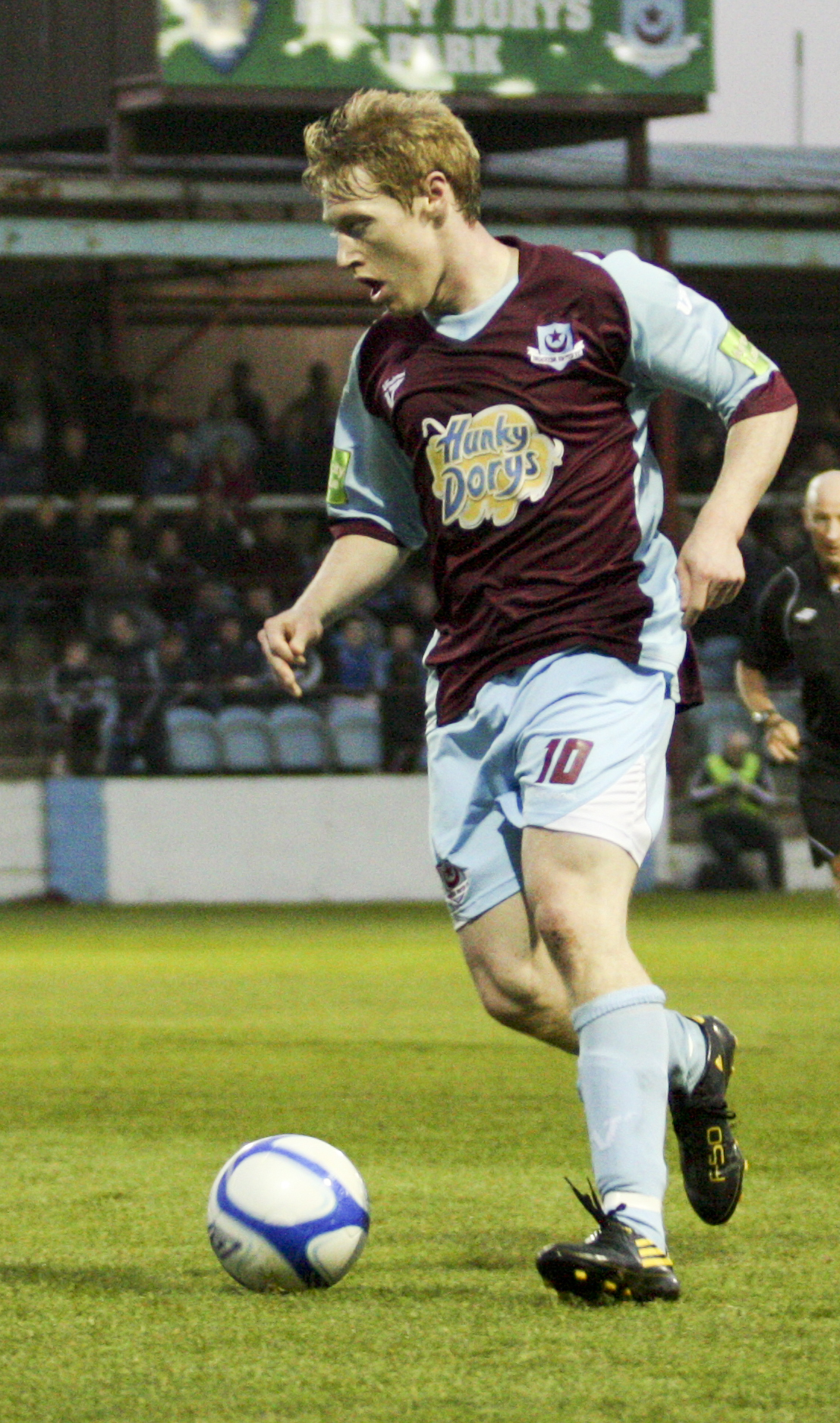
Darragh Hanaphy playing for Drogheda United FC at United Park in 2011

United Park, currently known as Sullivan and Lambe Park for sponsorship reasons is an Irish association football stadium in Drogheda, County Louth. The ground has been home to League of Ireland side Drogheda United since 1979. It was officially opened on 12 August 1979 with a friendly against Queens Park Rangers.

The ground has a capacity of 3,500 with 1,500 seats. The stadium previously held 5,400 but the safe capacity was reduced in 2007 on request by the Louth County Fire Officer.

The stadium has also hosted five Republic of Ireland under-21 national football team games and other international underage games including games in the 1994 UEFA European Under-16 Football Championship.

== History ==
The original Drogheda United were founded in 1919 as a non-league club playing junior football in County Louth. The club initially played their games in Magdalene Park, before moving to the Showgrounds and then finally on to United Park in 1927.

After Drogheda United were relegated to the newly formed First Division upon conclusion of the 1984–85 League of Ireland season, the stadium was given to the Football Association of Ireland (FAI), to be held in trust, by Drogheda United chairman Vincent Hoey. However, the ground was then sold to the FAI in the late 1980s with Drogheda United retaining a repurchase option.

In October 1993, the first match under floodlights took place with a 2–1 win over Shamrock Rovers.

The ground was briefly known as "O_{2} Park" during 2002 and 2003, as part of a sponsorship deal with the telecommunications company O_{2}. Proposals were made to sell the site and build a 10,000 all seater new stadium on the outskirts of the town. In June 2008, planning permission was given to Drogheda United by Meath County Council, however, the plans eventually fell through.

A two year sponsorship deal was announced by Drogheda United in March 2010 which saw Hunky Dory's become the team's shirt and stadium sponsor, with United Park renamed "Hunky Dorys Park". By the middle of 2010, renovations were completed to bring the venue up to licensing standards; changes include the addition of seats to the GAA side of the ground (to bring the seating capacity up to 1,500), new toilet facilities and a new covered section dedicated to wheelchair users. By 2015, the stadium name had reverted to United Park.

In 2020, Drogheda United announced they would rename United Park after a charity. Upon gathering submissions, a draw was held to determine the winner. Head in the Game, a mental health charity set up to raise awareness across the football community, was chosen and the stadium was subsequently named "Head in the Game Park" ahead of the 2021 season. This name remained until the 2023 season, when the stadium was again renamed "Weavers Park" as part of a sponsorship deal with a local bar & restaurant.

Drogheda United exercised a repurchase option of the ground in 2024, returning the stadium to club ownership after 35 years. Later that year, the club announced their third stadium name change in five years, with stone suppliers Sullivan and Lambe coming aboard as sponsors for the 2025 season. A number of improvements were also made to the ground, with new toilet facilities, new home & away dressing rooms and new seats added.

== Structure and facilities ==
United Park has three spectator areas: North, East and West. There is no South stand due to the proximity of the adjacent housing estate in Anneville Crescent.

=== North Stand ===
Also known as the Cross Lane End, this wedge shaped area behind the goal is uncovered and offers standing room only. This end houses a club bar as well as toilet facilities that were added in 2025.

=== East Stands ===
The eastern section of the ground runs parallel to Windmill Road. It consists of two separate stands, as well as the clubhouse which is located on the south-east corner. While both stands are covered by a roof, only the stand beside the clubhouse is seated. This smaller stand is situated between the home & away dugouts and seats nearly 400 fans. The larger stand in the north-east corner is terraced and houses the away fans.

=== West Stand ===
Also known as the Crosslanes Stand, this was originally a covered terrace stand flanked by 12 rows of open terracing. The first 7 rows had over 1,100 sky blue seats added in 2010 to meet minimum league licensing requirements. The last five rows of steps have remained terraced, separated from the seats with a line of crush barriers on the 8th row. The roof spans out from the centre and covers roughly 80% of the stand with the television gantry situated on top. The club shop is located at the back of the Crosslanes Stand.
