= 2012 Sligo Rovers F.C. season =

Sligo Rovers F.C.
2012 season
- Chairman: Dermot Kelly
- Coach: (England) Ian Baraclough
- Stadium: The Showgrounds
- Premier Division: 1st (champions)
- FAI Cup: 2nd Round
- League of Ireland Cup: Semi-finalists
- Setanta Sports Cup: Semi-finalists
- UEFA Europa League: Second Qualifying round
- Top goalscorer: League: Danny North (14); All: Danny North (17)
- Highest home attendance: 6,097 (26 October vs Shamrock Rovers, League of Ireland)
- Lowest home attendance: 1,378 (9 April vs Monaghan United, League of Ireland Cup)
- Average home league attendance: 2,486
Home colours	Away colours

The 2012 Sligo Rovers F.C. season was the club's 68th season competing in the League of Ireland and the team's first season under the management of Ian Baraclough. It was the team's seventh consecutive season in the Premier Division. Sligo Rovers won their first title in 35 years.

== Squad ==
No.	Name	Nationality	Position (s)	Date of birth (age)	Signed from	Signed in	Club Apps.	Club Goals
Goalkeepers
1	Gary Rogers	(Republic of Ireland)	GK	25 September 1981 (age 45)	(Republic of Ireland) St Patrick's Athletic	2012	35	0
12	Richard Brush	(England)	GK	26 November 1984 (age 41)	(Republic of Ireland) Shamrock Rovers	2012	142	0
23	Ciaran Kelly	(Republic of Ireland)	GK	4 May 1980 (age 46)	(Republic of Ireland) Athlone Town	2009	93	0
Defenders
2	Alan Keane	(Republic of Ireland)	RB	23 September 1984 (age 42)	(Republic of Ireland) Galway United	2009	156	17
3	Iarfhlaith Davoren	(Republic of Ireland)	LB	12 May 1986 (age 40)	(Republic of Ireland) Galway United	2010	99	1
4	Gavin Peers	(Republic of Ireland)	CB	10 November 1985 (age 41)	(England) Mansfield Town	2006	249	20
6	Jeff Henderson	(England)	CB	19 December 1991 (age 34)	(England) Newcastle United	2012	6	0
11	Ross Gaynor	(Republic of Ireland)	LB	9 September 1987 (age 39)	(Republic of Ireland) Dundalk	2012	36	1
20	Jason McGuinness	(Republic of Ireland)	CB	12 August 1982 (age 44)	(Republic of Ireland) Bohemians	2011	73	7
24	Jake Dykes	(Republic of Ireland)	LB/CB	30 June 1995 (age 31)	(Republic of Ireland) N/A	2012	4	0
28	Martin Owens	(Republic of Ireland)	RB	12 February 1993 (age 33)	(Republic of Ireland) N/A	2012	6	0
Midfielders
5	Danny Ventre (captain)	(England)	DM / CM	23 January 1986 (age 40)	(England) Accrington Stanley	2007	194	7
7	John Dillon	(England)	RW	2 August 1988 (age 38)	(England) Crewe Alexandra	2010	97	12
14	Pascal Millien	(Haiti)	RW	3 May 1986 (age 40)	(United States) Tampa Bay Rowdies	2012	26	2
15	Joseph Ndo	(Cameroon)	CM	28 April 1976 (age 50)	(Republic of Ireland) Bohemians	2010	108	9
15	Lee Lynch	(Republic of Ireland)	CM	27 November 1991 (age 34)	(Republic of Ireland) Drogheda United	2012	36	4
22	David Cawley	(Republic of Ireland)	DM / CM	17 September 1991 (age 35)	(England) Ipswich Town	2012	34	2
26	Ryan Connolly	(Republic of Ireland)	LW	13 January 1992 (age 34)	(England) Derby	2012	8	0
29	Seamus Conneely	(Republic of Ireland)	CM / RW	9 July 1988 (age 38)	(England) Sheffield United	2012	16	1
Forwards
9	Mark Quigley	(Republic of Ireland)	ST	27 October 1985 (age 41)	(Republic of Ireland) Dundalk	2012	32	13
10	Raffaele Cretaro	(Republic of Ireland)	ST / RW	15 October 1981 (age 45)	(Republic of Ireland) Bohemians	2011	362	62
27	Danny North	(England)	ST	7 September 1987 (age 39)	(Republic of Ireland) St Patricks Athletic	2012	23	17
39	Liam Buchanan	(Scotland)	ST	27 March 1985 (age 41)	(Scotland) Dunfermline Athletic	2012	10	2

=== Transfers ===
==== In ====
Player	Country	Position	Signed From
Gary Rogers	(Republic of Ireland)	Goalkeeper	St Patrick's Athletic
Lee Lynch	(Republic of Ireland)	Midfielder	Drogheda United
Romauld Boco	(Benin)	Midfielder	Shanghai East Asia
Ross Gaynor	(Republic of Ireland)	Midfielder	Dundalk
Mark Quigley	(Republic of Ireland)	Forward	Dundalk
Danny North	(Republic of Ireland)	Forward	St Patrick's Athletic
Richard Brush	(England)	Goalkeeper	Shamrock Rovers
David Cawley	(Republic of Ireland)	Midfielder	Ipswich Town
Pascal Millien	(Haiti)	Midfielder	Tampa Bay Rowdies
Ryan Connolly	(Republic of Ireland)	Midfielder	Derby County
Seamus Conneely	(Republic of Ireland)	Defender	Sheffield United
Jeff Henderson	(England)	Defender	Newcastle United
Liam Buchanan	(Scotland)	Forward	Dunfermline

==== Out ====
Player	Country	Position	Sold To
Brendan Clarke	(Republic of Ireland)	Goalkeeper	St Patrick's Athletic
Conor Powell	(Republic of Ireland)	Defender	Shamrock Rovers
Derek Foran	(Republic of Ireland)	Defender	Dundalk
Richie Ryan	(Republic of Ireland)	Midfielder	Dundee United
John Russell	(Republic of Ireland)	Midfielder	St Patrick's Athletic
Matthew Blinkhorn	(England)	Forward	York City
Eoin Doyle	(Republic of Ireland)	Forward	Hibernian
Daryl Horgan	(Republic of Ireland)	Midfielder	Cork City
Aaron Greene	(Republic of Ireland)	Midfielder	Shamrock Rovers
Romuald Boco	(Benin)	Midfielder	Accrinton Stanley

=== Squad statistics ===
==== Appearances, goals and cards ====
Last Updated – 30 October 2012

No.	Pos.	Name	League		FAI Cup		League Cup		Setanta Cup		Europa League		Total		Discipline	
No.	Pos.	Name	Apps	Goals	Apps	Goals	Apps	Goals	Apps	Goals	Apps	Goals	Apps	Goals	Yellow card	Red card
1	GK	(Republic of Ireland) Gary Rogers	29	0	1	0	1	0	2	0	2	0	35	0	0	0
2	DF	(Republic of Ireland) Alan Keane	17	1	1	0	2	0	4	0	0	0	24	1	2	2
3	DF	(Republic of Ireland) Iarfhlaith Davoren	11(2)	0	0	0	3	0	3	0	0	0	17(2)	0	5	0
4	DF	(Republic of Ireland) Gavin Peers	28	4	1	0	1	0	4	0	2	1	36	5	10	0
5	MF	(England) Danny Ventre	25	0	1	0	3	0	4	0	2	0	35	0	7	1
6	DF	(England) Jeff Henderson	4	0	0	0	1	0	0	0	0(1)	0	5(1)	0	1	0
7	MF	(England) John Dillon	8(10)	0	0	0	1(2)	0	2(1)	0	0	0	11(13)	0	1	0
8	MF	(Benin) Romauld Boco	21	2	0	0	3	0	3(1)	2	2	0	29(1)	4	5	0
9	FW	(Republic of Ireland) Mark Quigley	22(3)	10	1	1	1	0	3(1)	2	1	0	28(4)	13	4	1
10	FW	(Republic of Ireland) Raffaele Cretaro	19(8)	6	0(1)	0	3	2	1(2)	0	1	0	24(11)	8	2	0
11	MF	(Republic of Ireland) Ross Gaynor	25(2)	0	1	0	2	1	4	0	2	0	34(2)	1	6	0
12	GK	(England) Richard Brush	1	0	0	0	2	0	2	0	0	0	5	0	0	0
14	MF	(Haiti) Pascal Millien	11(9)	2	0(1)	0	0(2)	0	0(1)	0	1(1)	0	12(14)	2	0	0
15	MF	(Cameroon) Joseph Ndo	23	1	0	0	1(1)	0	3(1)	0	2	0	29(2)	1	2	0
16	MF	(Republic of Ireland) Lee Lynch	17(10)	2	1	0	1(2)	1	4	0	0(1)	0	22(14)	3	3	0
17	FW	(Republic of Ireland) Mark McGoldrick	0(1)	0	0	0	1	0	0	0	0	0	1(1)	0	0	0
18	FW	(Republic of Ireland) Liam Martin	0(1)	0	0	0	0(1)	0	0	0	0	0	0(2)	0	0	0
20	DF	(Republic of Ireland) Jason McGuinness	25	3	1	0	1	0	2	0	2	1	31	4	1	1
21	DF	(Republic of Ireland) Colm McLoughlin	0	0	0	0	0	0	0	0	0	0	0	0	0	0
22	MF	(Republic of Ireland) David Cawley	17(9)	2	1	0	2	0	1(2)	0	2	0	23(11)	2	6	0
23	GK	(Republic of Ireland) Ciaran Kelly	0	0	0	0	0	0	0	0	0	0	0	0	0	0
24	DF	(Republic of Ireland) Jake Dykes	0(2)	0	1	0	0(1)	0	0	0	0	0	1(3)	0	1	0
26	MF	(Republic of Ireland) Ryan Connolly	1(5)	0	0	0	1	0	0	0	0(1)	0	2(6)	0	0	0
27	FW	(England) Danny North	16	14	1	0	1	2	2(1)	1	2	0	22(1)	18	4	0
28	DF	(Republic of Ireland) Martin Owens	0(5)	0	0	0	1	0	0	0	0	0	1(5)	0	0	0
29	DF	(Republic of Ireland) Seamus Conneely	11(2)	1	0	0	1	0	0	0	2	0	14(2)	1	1	0
39	FW	(Scotland) Liam Buchanan	1(9)	2	0	0	0	0	0	0	0	0	1(9)	2	0	0

==== Top scorers ====
Includes all competitive matches. The list is sorted by shirt number when total goals are equal. Last updated 22 October 2012

Position	Nation	Number	Name	Premier League	Setanta Cup	FAI Cup	League Cup	Europa League	Total
1	(England)	27	Danny North	14	1	0	2	0	17
2	(Republic of Ireland)	9	Mark Quigley	10	2	1	0	0	13
3	(Republic of Ireland)	10	Raffaele Cretaro	6	0	2	0	0	8
4	(Republic of Ireland)	4	Gavin Peers	4	0	0	0	1	5
5	(Benin)	8	Romuald Boco	2	2	0	0	0	4
5	(Republic of Ireland)	16	Lee Lynch	3	0	0	1	0	4
5	(Republic of Ireland)	20	Jason McGuinness	3	0	0	0	1	4
8	(Haiti)	14	Pascal Millien	2	0	0	0	0	2
8	(Republic of Ireland)	22	David Cawley	2	0	0	0	0	2
8	(Scotland)	39	Liam Buchanan	1	0	0	0	0	1
11	(Republic of Ireland)	2	Alan Keane	1	0	0	0	0	1
11	(Republic of Ireland)	11	Ross Gaynor	0	0	0	1	0	1
11	(Cameroon)	15	Joseph Ndo	1	0	0	0	0	1
11	(Republic of Ireland)	29	Seamus Conneely	1	0	0	0	0	1

==== Top assists ====
Includes all competitive matches. The list is sorted by shirt number when total assists are equal. Last updated 22 October 2012

Position	Nation	Number	Name	Premier League	Setanta Cup	FAI Cup	League Cup	Europa League	Total
1	(Republic of Ireland)	11	Ross Gaynor	0	2	0	0	0	2
2	(Cameroon)	15	Joseph Ndo	5	1	0	0	1	7
3	(Republic of Ireland)	10	Raffaele Cretaro	5	0	0	1	0	6
4	(Republic of Ireland)	16	Lee Lynch	3	1	1	0	0	5
5	(Republic of Ireland)	2	Alan Keane	3	0	0	0	0	3
5	(Republic of Ireland)	4	Gavin Peers	3	0	0	0	0	3
5	(Benin)	8	Romuald Boco	3	0	0	0	0	3
5	(Republic of Ireland)	9	Mark Quigley	3	0	0	0	0	3
9	(Haiti)	14	Pascal Millien	2	0	1	0	0	3
10	(England)	27	Danny North	0	0	1	0	1	2
11	(England)	5	Danny Ventre	1	0	0	0	0	1
11	(England)	7	John Dillon	1	0	0	0	0	1
11	(Republic of Ireland)	20	Jason McGuinness	1	0	0	0	0	1
11	(Republic of Ireland)	26	Ryan Connolly	0	0	0	1	0	1
11	(Republic of Ireland)	28	Martin Owens	0	0	0	1	0	1
11	(Republic of Ireland)	29	Seamus Conneely	1	0	0	0	0	1

==== Disciplinary record ====
N	Pos.	Nat.	Name	Yellow card	Second yellow card	Red card	Notes
2	DF	(Republic of Ireland)	Keane	2		1	
3	DF	(Republic of Ireland)	Davoren	4			
4	DF	(Republic of Ireland)	Peers	7			
5	MF	(England)	Ventre	6		1	
7	MF	(England)	Dillon	1			
8	MF	(Benin)	Boco	3			
9	FW	(Republic of Ireland)	Quigley	2		1	
10	FW	(Republic of Ireland)	Cretaro	2		0	
11	MF	(Republic of Ireland)	Gaynor	5			
15	MF	(Cameroon)	Ndo	1			
16	MF	(Republic of Ireland)	Lynch	2			
20	DF	(Republic of Ireland)	McGuinness	1	1		
22	MF	(Republic of Ireland)	Cawley	4			
24	DF	(Republic of Ireland)	Dykes	1			
27	FW	(England)	North	4			
29	MF	(Republic of Ireland)	Conneely	1			

Last updated: 22 October 2012
Only competitive matches
(yellow card) = Number of bookings; (second yellow card) = Number of sending offs after a second yellow card; (red card) = Number of sending offs by a direct red card.
Notes: League only

== Technical staff ==
- Manager: Ian Baraclough
- Assistant Manager: Gerry Carr
- Coach: Maurice Monaghan

== Competitions ==
=== League of Ireland ===
==== League table ====
Pos	Team	Pld	W	D	L	GF	GA	GD	Pts	Qualification or relegation
1	Sligo Rovers (C)	30	17	10	3	53	23	+30	61	Qualification for Champions League second qualifying round
2	Drogheda United	30	17	6	7	51	36	+15	57	Qualification for Europa League first qualifying round
3	St Patrick's Athletic	30	15	10	5	44	22	+22	55	Qualification for Europa League first qualifying round
4	Shamrock Rovers	30	14	10	6	56	37	+19	52	
5	Derry City	30	11	6	13	36	36	0	39	Qualification for Europa League second qualifying round (Note: Derry City qualified for the UEFA Europa League second qualifying round after winning the 2012 FAI Cup Final.)
6	Cork City	30	8	12	10	38	36	+2	36	
7	Bohemians	30	9	9	12	35	38	−3	36	
8	Shelbourne	30	9	8	13	35	43	−8	35	
9	UCD	30	8	7	15	32	48	−16	31	
10	Bray Wanderers	30	5	10	15	33	54	−21	25	
11	Dundalk (O)	30	4	8	18	23	63	−40	20	Qualification for relegation play-off
12	Monaghan United (R)	0	0	0	0	0	0	0	0	Withdrew from league (Note: Monaghan United withdrew after 14 games. Their record was expunged.)

(C) Champions; (O) Play-off winners; (R) Relegated

==== Results summary ====
Overall								Home						Away					
Pld	W	D	L	GF	GA	GD	Pts	W	D	L	GF	GA	GD	W	D	L	GF	GA	GD
30	17	10	3	53	23	+30	61	11	4	1	37	13	+24	6	6	2	16	10	+6

Last updated: 30 October 2012.

==== Results by round ====
Round	1	2	3	4	5	6	7	8	9	10	11	12	13	14	15	16	17	18	19	20	21	22	23	24	25	26	27	28	29	30
Ground	A	H	H	H	A	H	A	H	A	H	H	A	A	A	H	A	H	A	H	A	A	H	H	H	A	H	A	H	A	H
Result	D	W	W	W	W	D	W	D	W	W	W	L	D	W	D	W	D	W	D	W	W	D	W	W	D	W	D	W	L	L
Position	6	5	4	2	1	1	1	1	1	1	1	1	1	1	1	1	1	1	1	1	1	1	1	1	1	1	1	1	1	1

Source: 2012 League of Ireland Premier Division
A = Away; H = Home; W = Win; D = Draw; L = Loss

==== Matches ====
Win Draw Loss

2 March Round 1	Shelbourne	1–1	Sligo Rovers	Tolka Park, Dublin
20:00 IWT	Philip Hughes 42'	(Report)	Jason McGuinness 90'	Attendance: 1,918; Referee: Derek Tomney

10 March Round 2	Sligo Rovers	2–1	UCD	The Showgrounds, Sligo
19:45 IWT	Danny North 23'; Jason McGuinness 90'	(Report)	Paul O'Connor 90'	Attendance: 2,097; Referee: Rob Rogers

16 March Round 3	Sligo Rovers	1–0	Bohemians	The Showgrounds, Sligo
19:45 IWT	Lee Lynch 76'	(Report)		Attendance: 2,573; Referee: Graham Kelly

23 March Round 4	Monaghan United	0–1	Sligo Rovers	Gortakeegan, Monaghan
20:00 IWT		(Report)	Danny North 49'	Attendance: 750; Referee: Richie Winter

31 March Round 5	Sligo Rovers	3–0	Dundalk	The Showgrounds, Sligo
19:45 IST	Danny North 48', 90'; Gavin Peers 54'	(Report)		Attendance: 2,586; Referee: Paul McLaughlin

6 April Round 6	Bray Wanderers	1–2	Sligo Rovers	Carlisle Grounds, Bray
19:45 IST	Kieran Waters 19'	(Report)	Raffaele Cretaro 10'; Danny North 49'	Attendance: 1,500; Referee: Alan Kelly

14 April Round 7	Sligo Rovers	1–1	Derry City	The Showgrounds, Sligo
19:05 IST	Danny North 24'	(Report)	David McDaid 35'	Attendance: 2,488; Referee: Richie Winter

20 April Round 8	Cork City	0–1	Sligo Rovers	Turners Cross, Cork
19:45 IST		(Report)	Danny North 79'	Attendance: 3,142; Referee: Neil Doyle

27 April Round 9	Sligo Rovers	1–1	St Pats	The Showgrounds, Sligo
19:05 IST	Kenny Browne O.G. 18'	(Report)	Sean O'Connor 72'	Attendance: 1,947; Referee: Alan Kelly

4 May Round 10	Drogheda United	1–3	Sligo Rovers	Hunky Dorys Park, Drogheda
19:45 IST	Declan O'Brien 39'	(Report)	Gavin Peers 10'; Danny North 35', 80'	Attendance: 1,087; Referee: Damien Hancock

12 May Round 11	Sligo Rovers	3–0	Shamrock Rovers	The Showgrounds, Sligo
13:45 IST	Danny North 30', 77'; David Cawley 37'	(Report)		Attendance: 2,823; Referee: Tom Connolly

18 May Round 12	Sligo Rovers	3–0	Shelbourne	The Showgrounds, Sligo
19:45 IST	Danny North 43', 47'; Pascal Millien 84'	(Report)		Attendance: 2,477; Referee: Paul Tuite

21 May Round 13	UCD	1–0	Sligo Rovers	UCD Bowl, Dublin
19:45 IST	Graham Rusk 29'	(Report)		Attendance: 653; Referee: Padraig Sutton

1 June Round 14	Bohemians	0–0	Sligo Rovers	Dalymount Park, Dublin
19:45 IST		(Report)		Attendance: 1,400; Referee: Damien Hancock

23 June Round 15	Sligo Rovers	v	Monaghan United	The Showgrounds, Sligo
19:45 IST

29 June Round 16	Dundalk	1–2	Sligo Rovers	Oriel Park, Dundalk
19:45 IST	Michael Rafter 36'	(Report)	Danny North 43', 49'	Attendance: 500; Referee: Dave McKeon

7 July Round 17	Sligo Rovers	1–1	Bray Wanderers	The Showgrounds, Sligo
15:45 IST	Alan Keane 63'	(Report)	Jason Byrne 49'	Attendance: 1,778; Referee: Graham Kelly

13 July Round 18	Derry City	1–2	Sligo Rovers	Brandywell Stadium, Derry
19:05 IST	David McDaid 65'	(Report)	David Cawley 55'; Mark Quigley 86'	Attendance: 1,100; Referee: Damien Hancock

23 July Round 19	Sligo Rovers	2–2	Cork City	The Showgrounds, Sligo
19:00 IST	Mark Quigley 64', 83'	(Report)	Ian Turner 7'; Vinny Sullivan 58'	Attendance: 2,227; Referee: Paul Tuite

24 August Round 20	St. Patrick's Athletic	0–0	Sligo Rovers	Richmond Park, Dublin
19:45 IST		(Report)		Referee: Neil Doyle

4 August Round 21	Sligo Rovers	4–1	Drogheda United	The Showgrounds, Sligo
19:45 IST	Mark Quigley 10'; Seamus Conneely 42'; Romuald Boco 60'; Joseph Ndo 80'	(Report)	Peter Hynes 75'	Attendance: 2,550; Referee: Alan Kelly

13 August Round 22	Shamrock Rovers	1–1	Sligo Rovers	Tallaght Stadium, Dublin
20:00 IST	Ronan Finn 49'	(Report)	Mark Quigley 32'	Attendance: 5,000; Referee: Anthony Buttimer

17 August Round 23	Shelbourne	1–3	Sligo Rovers	Tolka Park, Dublin
20:00 IST	Paddy Kavanagh 83'	(Report)	Jason McGuinness 2'; Gavin Peers 16'; Mark Quigley 76'	Attendance: 1,205; Referee: Paul Tuite

20 August Round 24	Sligo Rovers	3–0	UCD	The Showgrounds, Sligo
19:45 IST	Mark Quigley 38'; Pascal Millien 40'; Romuald Boco 76'	(Report)		Attendance: 2,375; Referee: Paul McLaughlin

3 September Round 25	Sligo Rovers	3–1	Bohemians	The Showgrounds, Sligo
20:00 IST	Quigley 12'; Cretaro 26'; Lynch 38'	(Report)	Pender 90+3'	Attendance: 3,127; Referee: Damien Hancock

7 September Round 26	Monaghan United	v	Sligo Rovers	Gortakeegan, Monaghan
20:00 IST

10 September Round 27	Sligo Rovers	3–0	Dundalk	The Showgrounds, Sligo
19:45 IST	Quigley 10'; Peers 49'; Buchanan 86'	(Report)		Attendance: 3,265; Referee: Tom Connolly

21 September Round 28	Bray Wanderers	0–0	Sligo Rovers	Carlisle Grounds, Bray
19:05 IST		(Report)		Attendance: 1,500; Referee: Anthony Buttimer

29 September Round 29	Sligo Rovers	4–1	Derry City	The Showgrounds, Sligo
19:45 IST	McBride 14' (o.g.); Cretaro 36', 55'; Lynch 76'	(Report)	McDaid 69'	Attendance: 4,083; Referee: Paul Tuite

5 October Round 30	Cork City	0–0	Sligo Rovers	Turners Cross, Cork
20:00 IST		(Report)		Attendance: 3,071; Referee: Derek Tomney

13 October Round 31	Sligo Rovers	3–2	St Pats	The Showgrounds, Sligo
15:45 IST	Cretaro 21', 24'; Quigley 89' (pen.); Ventre (red card) 90+2'	(Report)	Fagan 53'; Forrester 60'; O'Connor (red card) 90+2'	Attendance: 5,621; Referee: Damien Hancock

19 October Round 32	Drogheda United	2–1	Sligo Rovers	Hunky Dorys Park, Drogheda
19:05 IST	McNally 30'; Gannon 89'	(Report)	Buchanan 46'	Attendance: 1,181; Referee: Tom Connolly

26 October Round 33	Sligo Rovers	0–2	Shamrock Rovers	The Showgrounds, Sligo
19:45 IST		(Report)	Twigg 10', 57'	Attendance: 6,097; Referee: Anthony Buttimer

=== FAI Cup ===
Win Draw Loss

==== Third round ====
25 May	Sligo Rovers	1–3	Monaghan United	The Showgrounds, Sligo
19:45 IWT	Mark Quigley 8'	(Report)	Tony Griffiths 29'; Jason Marks 72'; Keith Quinn 84'	Referee: Paul McLoughlin

=== Setanta Cup ===
Win Draw Loss

==== quarter-final ====
5 March First Leg	Sligo Rovers	2–0	Glentoran	The Showgrounds, Sligo
19:45 IWT	Romauld Boco 37'; Mark Quigley 63'	(Report)		Attendance: 2,145; Referee: Padraic Sutton

20 March Second Leg	Glentoran	1–1	Sligo Rovers	The Oval, Belfast
19:45 IWT	Sean Ward 22'	(Report)	Danny North 89'	Attendance: 800; Referee: R Heatherington

Sligo Rovers won 3–1 on aggregate

==== semi-final ====
16 April First Leg	Crusaders	2–0	Sligo Rovers	Seaview, Belfast
19:45 IWT	David Rainey 41', 81'	(Report)		Attendance: 800; Referee: Neil Doyle

23 April Second Leg	Sligo Rovers	2–1 (a.e.t.)	Crusaders	The Showgrounds, Sligo
20:00 IWT	Romauld Boco 35'; Mark Quigley 48'	(Report)	Colin Coates 105'	Attendance: 1,780; Referee: Arnold Hunter

Sligo Rovers lost 3–2 on aggregate

=== EA Sports Cup ===
Win Draw Loss

==== Second round ====
9 April	Sligo Rovers	3–1	Monaghan United	The Showgrounds, Sligo
18:30 IWT	Conor McMahon O.G. 24', 67'; Ross Gaynor 79'	(report)	Owen Humphrey 55'	Attendance: 1,378; Referee: Padraig Sutton

==== quarter-final ====
26 June	Sligo Rovers	4–0	Derry City	The Showgrounds, Sligo
19:45 IWT	Raffaele Cretaro 50', 83'; Danny North 78', 85'	(report)		Attendance: 1,430; Referee: Rob Rodgers

==== semi-final ====
6 August	Drogheda United	2–1	Sligo Rovers	Hunky Dorys Park, Drogheda
15:00 IWT	Gavin Brennan 26'; Tiarnan Mulvenna 29'	(report)	Lee Lynch 60'	Referee: Padraig Sutton

=== Europa League ===
Win Draw Loss

==== 2nd qualifying round ====
19 July First Leg	Spartak Trnava	3–1	Sligo Rovers	Štadión Antona Malatinského, Trnava
19:00	Miroslav Karhan 38'; Martin Mikovic 44', 45'	(Report)	Gavin Peers 69'	Referee: Aleksandrs Anufrijevs

26 July Second Leg	Sligo Rovers	1–1	Spartak Trnava	The Showgrounds, Sligo
19:00	Jason McGuinness 90'	(Report)	Peter Cvirik 70'	Attendance: 3,754; Referee: Maksim Layushkin

Sligo Rovers lost 4–2 on aggregate

=== Preseason friendlies ===
Win Draw Loss

28 January	Boyle Celtic	0–3	Sligo Rovers	Celtic Park, Boyle
18:00 IWT		(Report)	Romauld Boco 52'; Raffaele Cretaro 55'; Aaron Greene 70'	Referee: Paul Deering

4 February	SD Galway	0–1	Sligo Rovers	Drom Soccer Park
14:00 IWT		(Report)	Mark Quigley 60'

13 February	Limerick	2–3	Sligo Rovers	Terryland Park, Galway
19:45 IWT	Derek O'Brien 5'; Dawid Janczyk 65'	[(Report)]	Raffaele Cretaro 20', 40'; Alan Keane 30'

18 February	Sligo Rovers	3–0	Athlone Town	The Showgrounds, Sligo
18:00 IWT	Raffaele Cretaro 20'; Pascal Millien 70'; Danny North 80'	(Report)		Referee: Paul Deering

25 February	Longford Town	0–3	Sligo Rovers	Flancare Park, Longford
14:30 IWT		[(Report)]	Raffaele Cretaro 20', 40'; Danny North 60'

3 April	Castlebar Celtic	2–1	Sligo Rovers	Celtic Park, Castlebar
19:30 IWT		[(Report)]	Liam Martin 50'

16 June	Westport United	0–4	Sligo Rovers	Westport Sports Park
19:00 IWT		[(Report)]	Raffaele Cretaro 05', 30'; Jeff Henderson 55'; Liam Martin 70'

== Records ==
=== Overall ===
	Total	Home	Away
Games played	40	22	18
Games won	21	15	6
Games drawn	12	5	7
Games lost	7	1	6
Biggest win	4–0 vs Derry City	4–0 vs Derry City	3–1 vs Drogheda United & Shelbourne
Biggest loss	0–2 vs Crusaders & Shamrock Rovers & 1–3 vs Monaghan United & 1–3 vs Spartak Trnava	1–3 vs Monaghan United & 0–2 Shamrock Rovers	0–2 vs Crusaders & 1–3 vs Spartak Trnava
Biggest win (League)	3–0 vs Dundalk & Shamrock Rovers & Shelbourne & Dundalk & 4–1 vs Drogheda United & Derry City	3–0 vs Dundalk & Shamrock Rovers & Shelbourne & Dundalk & 4–1 vs Drogheda United & Derry City	3–1 vs Drogheda United & Shelbourne
Biggest win (Cup)	4–0 vs Derry City	4–0 vs Derry City	
Biggest loss (League)	0–2 vs Shamrock Rovers	0–2 vs Shamrock Rovers	0–1 vs UCD & 1–2 vs Drogheda United
Biggest loss (Cup)	0–2 vs Crusaders & 1–3 vs Monaghan United & 1–3 vs Spartak Trnava	1–3 vs Monaghan United	0–2 vs Crusaders & 1–3 vs Spartak Trnava
Biggest loss (Europe)	1–3 vs Spartak Trnava		1–3 vs Spartak Trnava
Clean sheets	13	8	5
Goals scored	69	50	19
Goals conceded	36	19	17
Goal difference	+33	+31	+2
Consecutive Victories	4	5	2
Unbeaten run	10	10	4
Consecutive Defeats	2	1	2
Winless Run	3	3	3
Average GF per game	1.73	2.27	1.06
Average GA per game	0.9	0.86	0.94
Yellow cards	64	28	36
Red cards	5	3	2
Most appearances	(Republic of Ireland) Gavin Peers & Lee Lynch & Ross Gaynor (36)	–	
Most minutes played	(Republic of Ireland) Gary Rogers(3,150)	–	
Top scorer	(England) Danny North (17)		
Top assists	(Republic of Ireland) Ross Gaynor(11)	–	
Points	61/90 (67.78%)	37/48 (77.08%)	24/42 (57.14%)
Winning rate	56.67%	68.75%	42.86%

Last updated: 30 October 2012
Source: Competitive matches
