= 2013 Shelbourne F.C. season =

Shelbourne
2013 season
- Chairman: Joe Casey
- Manager: Alan Mathews and later Johnny McDonnell
- Premier Division: 12th (Relegated)
- FAI Cup: Quarter-finals
- League of Ireland Cup: First Round
Home colours	Away colours	Third colours

In 2013 Shelbourne F.C. competed in the League of Ireland Premier Division.

== The club ==
=== First team coaching and medical staff ===
Position	Name
Team Manager	Johnny McDonnell
Assistant Team Manager	Mick Byrne
First-team coach	Kevin Doherty
Goalkeeping coach	Charlie Tracey
Club Physiotherapist	John Coyle
Equipment Manager	Johnny Watson
Club Doctor	Dr. Joe McKeever

=== First Team Squad 2013 ===
As of March 4, 2013.

Note: Flags indicate national team as defined under FIFA eligibility rules; some limited exceptions apply. Players may hold more than one non-FIFA nationality.

No.	Pos.	Nation	Player
1	GK	IRL	Niall Burdon
2	DF	IRL	Brian Shortall
3	DF	IRL	Jack Memery
4	DF	IRL	Philip McCabe
5	DF	IRL	Graham Gartland
6	MF	IRL	Glenn Cronin
7	FW	IRL	Seán Brennan
8	MF	IRL	Paul Crowley
9	FW	IRL	Philip Hughes
10	FW	IRL	Dean Kelly
11	MF	IRL	Adam Hanlon
12	GK	IRL	Ger Hanley

No.	Pos.	Nation	Player
13	DF	IRL	Pat Flynn
14	MF	IRL	Robert Bayly
15	FW	IRL	Mark Leech
16	MF	IRL	Stephen Hurley
17	DF	IRL	Adam O'Connor
18	DF	IRL	Rob Cornwall
19	MF	IRL	Alex Prizeman
20	MF	IRL	Stephen Sheerin
21	MF	IRL	Craig Mooney
22	FW	IRL	Darren Tinnelly
23	DF	IRL	Ian Ryan

== Post-2012 season ==
=== Transfers In ===
As of March 4, 2013.

Date	Pos.	Name	From
27 November 2012	FW	(Republic of Ireland) Seán Brennan	Drogheda United
27 November 2012	DF	(Republic of Ireland) Pat Flynn	St. Patrick's Athletic
30 November 2012	DF	(Republic of Ireland) Jack Memery	Shamrock Rovers
3 December 2012	MF	(Republic of Ireland) Paul Crowley	Drogheda United
3 December 2012	MF	(Republic of Ireland) Adam Hanlon	Bray Wanderers
3 December 2012	FW	(Republic of Ireland) Dean Kelly	St. Patrick's Athletic
15 January 2013	MF	(Republic of Ireland) Robert Bayly	Longford Town
15 January 2013	GK	(Republic of Ireland) Niall Burdon	Stade Rennais
15 January 2013	GK	(Republic of Ireland) Ger Hanley	Mervue United
24 January 2013	DF	(Republic of Ireland) Graham Gartland	Shamrock Rovers
4 March 2013	DF	(Republic of Ireland) Philip McCabe	Dundalk
4 March 2013	FW	(Republic of Ireland) Mark Leech	Southern Stars
4 March 2013	MF	(Republic of Ireland) Craig Mooney	
4 March 2013	FW	(Republic of Ireland) Darren Tinnelly	Middle Georgia College

=== Transfers Out ===
As of October 26, 2012.

Date	Pos.	Name	To
26 October 2012	GK	(Scotland) Chris Bennion	Longford Town
26 October 2012	DF	(Republic of Ireland) Andy Boyle	Dundalk
26 October 2012	MF	(Republic of Ireland) Conan Byrne	St. Patrick's Athletic
26 October 2012	FW	(Republic of Ireland) Paul Byrne	
26 October 2012	DF	(Republic of Ireland) Seán Byrne	
26 October 2012	MF	(Republic of Ireland) David Cassidy	Drogheda United
26 October 2012	MF	(Republic of Ireland) Barry Clancy	Athlone Town
26 October 2012	MF	(Republic of Ireland) Kevin Dawson	Yeovil Town
26 October 2012	GK	(Republic of Ireland) Dean Delany	Bohemians
26 October 2012	DF	(Republic of Ireland) Lorcan Fitzgerald	
26 October 2012	FW	(Republic of Ireland) Philip Gorman	Athlone Town
26 October 2012	MF	(Republic of Ireland) Paddy Kavanagh	Derry City
26 October 2012	DF	(Republic of Ireland) Gareth Matthews	UCD
26 October 2012	MF	(Republic of Ireland) Anto Murphy	Sheriff Y.C.
26 October 2012	DF	(Republic of Ireland) Stephen Paisley	Bohemians
26 October 2012	GK	(Republic of Ireland) Paul Skinner	Athlone Town

== Premier Division ==
Win Draw Loss

=== Results ===
8 March 2013 1	Bray Wanderers	1 – 0	Shelbourne	Carlisle Grounds, Bray
19.45 GMT	Jason Byrne 67'	Report	Paul Crowley (red card) 28'	Attendance: 1,200; Referee: Pádraig Sutton (Clare)

15 March 2013 2	Shelbourne	1 – 3	Dundalk	Tolka Park, Dublin
20.00 GMT	Dean Kelly 43'; Graham Gartland (yellow card) 83' (red card)	Report	John Dillon 55'; Stephen O'Donnell 86'; John Mountney 90+4'	Attendance: 1,099; Referee: Anthony Buttimer (Cork)

19 March 2013 3	St. Patrick's Athletic	postponed	Shelbourne	Richmond Park, Dublin
19.45 GMT

24 March 2013 4	Shelbourne	0 – 0	Shamrock Rovers	Tolka Park, Dublin
15.55 GMT	Bayly (yellow card) 66'	Report		Attendance: 1,704; Referee: Alan Kelly (Cork)

29 March 2013 5	Derry City	4 – 0	Shelbourne	Brandywell Stadium, Derry
19.45 GMT	Shane McEleney (yellow card) 30'; Patterson 33'; Crowley 63' (o.g.); Michael Rafter 88'; Marc Griffin 90+2' (pen.)	Summary	Bayly (yellow card) 22'; Crowley (yellow card) 35'; Hurley (yellow card) 69'; Jack Memery (yellow card) 90+2'	Attendance: 1,400; Referee: David McKeon

1 April 2013 6	Shelbourne	0 – 1	Bohemians	Tolka Park, Dublin
19.00 IST	Ryan (yellow card) 31' (yellow-red card); Jack Memery (yellow card) 75'	Summary	Kevin Devaney 5' (yellow card) 21'; Mulcahy (yellow card) 70'; Keith Buckley (yellow card) 78'; Dwayne Wilson (yellow card) 87'	Attendance: 1,329; Referee: Padraigh Sutton

6 April 2013 7	Sligo Rovers	2 – 0	Shelbourne	The Showgrounds, Sligo
19.45 IST	Elding 15', 59'	Summary	Crowley (yellow card) 69'	Attendance: 3,158; Referee: P McLaughlin

12 April 2013 8	Shelbourne	1 - 3	Drogheda United	Tolka Park, Dublin
20.00 IST	Gartland (yellow card) 5'; Shortall 44' (yellow card) 84'; Hurley (yellow card) 50'; Crowley (yellow card) 72'	Summary	Ryan Brennan (yellow card) 4'; Derek Prendergast (yellow card) 9'; O'Brien 74' (yellow card) 76' (goal) 87' (pen.); O'Neill 80'	Attendance: 1,047; Referee: Rob Rogers

19 April 2013 9	Cork City	1 - 1	Shelbourne	Turners Cross, Cork
19.45 IST	Healy (yellow card) 18'; Dennehy (yellow card) 54'; Gearóid Morrissey (yellow card) 60'; Murphy 63'; Daryl Horgan (yellow card) 77'	Summary	Bayly (yellow card) 27'; Kelly (yellow card) 28'; Crowley (yellow card) 54'; Darren Tinnelly 90+4'	Attendance: 2,275; Referee: (Republic of Ireland) David McKeon

27 April 2013 10	Limerick	0 - 0	Shelbourne	Thomond Park, Limerick
19.45 IST	Williams (yellow card) 20'; Gamble (yellow card) 75'; Galbraith (yellow card) 77'	Summary	Bayly (red card) 9'	Attendance: 1,582; Referee: (Republic of Ireland) Neil Doyle

3 May 2013 11	Shelbourne	2 - 0	UCD	Tolka Park, Dublin
20.00 IST	Adam Hanlon 26'; Craig Mooney (yellow card) 63'; Hurley 67'	Summary		Attendance: 735; Referee: (Republic of Ireland) Graham Kelly

6 May 2013 12	Shelbourne	1 - 2	Bray Wanderers	Tolka Park, Dublin
19.00 IST	Shortall (yellow card) 48'; Leech 55'; Hughes (yellow card) 61'; Ryan (yellow card) 83'	Summary	Kieran Marty Waters 18'; Kevin Knight (yellow card) 42'; David Webster (yellow card) 61'; John Mulroy 75'	Attendance: 678; Referee: (Republic of Ireland) Rob Rogers

10 May 2013 13	Dundalk	1 - 0	Shelbourne	Oriel Park, Dundalk
19.45 IST	Boyle (yellow card) 85'; Mulvenna 86'	Summary	Shortall (red card) 79'	Attendance: 1,483; Referee: (Republic of Ireland) Alan Kelly

17 May 2013 14	Shelbourne	0 - 3	St. Patrick's Athletic	Tolka Park, Dublin
20.00 IST	Flynn (yellow card) 51'; Seán Brennan (yellow card) 56'; Gartland (yellow card) 69'; Jack Memery (red card) 80'	Summary	Fagan 53', 59' (yellow card) 65'; Brennan (yellow card) 54'; Forrester 77'	Attendance: 1,418; Referee: (Republic of Ireland) Anthony Buttimer

24 May 2013 15	Shamrock Rovers	1 - 0	Shelbourne	Tallaght Stadium, Dublin
20.00 IST	Rice (yellow card) 16'; Stewart (yellow card) 17'; Finn 29'	Summary	Bayly (yellow card) 40'; Rob Cornwall (yellow card) 44'; Seán Brennan (yellow card) 79'; Ryan (yellow card) 87'	Attendance: 2,000; Referee: (Republic of Ireland) Padraigh Sutton

8 June 2013 16	Shelbourne	0 - 1	Derry City	Tolka Park, Dublin
20.00 IST	Hurley (yellow card) 48'; Cronin (yellow card) 84'; Jack Memery (yellow card) 90+3'	Summary	Patterson (yellow card) 60'; Michael Duffy 65'	Attendance: 636; Referee: (Republic of Ireland) Derek Tomney

14 June 2013 17	Bohemians	0 - 3	Shelbourne	Dalymount Park, Dublin
19.45 IST	Pender (red card) 32'; Moore (yellow card) 62'; Keith Buckley (yellow card) 89'	Summary	Seán Brennan 6'; Jack Memery (yellow card) 23'; Kelly 34', 52'	Referee: (Republic of Ireland) Tom Connolly

28 June 2013 18	Shelbourne	0 - 2	Sligo Rovers	Tolka Park, Dublin
20.00 IST	Bayly (yellow card) 34'; Flynn (yellow card) 62'; Seán Brennan (yellow card) 72'; Gartland (yellow card) 90'	Summary	Conneely 58'; Djilali 78'	Attendance: 1,214; Referee: (Republic of Ireland) Neil Doyle

7 July 2013 19	Drogheda United	0 - 0	Shelbourne	Hunky Dorys Park, Drogheda
15.00 IST	O'Brien (yellow card) 45'; Michael Daly (yellow card) 90'	Summary	Bayly (yellow card) 31'; Shortall (yellow card) 62'; Flynn (yellow card) 80'	Attendance: 700; Referee: (Republic of Ireland) David McKeon

12 July 2013 20	Shelbourne	2 - 1	Cork City	Tolka Park, Dublin
20.00 IST	Lee Murtagh 56'; Gartland (yellow card) 58'; Ryan (yellow card) 69'; Darren Tinnelly 81'	Summary	Dunleavy (yellow card) 16'; Kalen Spillane 88'	Attendance: 805; Referee: (Republic of Ireland) Derek Tomney

19 July 2013 21	Shelbourne	2 - 1	Limerick	Tolka Park, Dublin
20.00 IST	Adam Hanlon 52'; Lee Murtagh 79'	Summary	Bossekota 17' (yellow card) 89'; David O'Leary (yellow card) 67'; Tracy (yellow card) 90+1'	Attendance: 783; Referee: (Republic of Ireland) Alan Kelly

26 July 2013 22	UCD	1 - 2	Shelbourne	UCD Bowl, Dublin
19.45 IST	Craig Walsh 17'; Douglas (yellow card) 23'; Mark Langtry (red card) 39'; James Kavanagh (red card) 55'; Barry McCabe (red card) 82'	Summary	Doyle (yellow card) 36'; Seán Brennan 43'; Kelly 53'	Attendance: 602; Referee: (Republic of Ireland) Sean Grant

2 August 2013 23	Bray Wanderers	vs	Shelbourne	Carlisle Grounds, Bray
19.45 IST

9 August 2013 24	Shelbourne	vs	Dundalk	Tolka Park, Dublin
20.00 IST

16 August 2013 25	St. Patrick's Athletic	vs	Shelbourne	Richmond Park, Dublin
19.45 IST

30 August 2013 26	Shelbourne	vs	Shamrock Rovers	Tolka Park, Dublin
20.00 IST

7 September 2013 27	Derry City	vs	Shelbourne	Brandywell Stadium, Derry
17.00 IST

20 September 2013 28	Shelbourne	vs	Bohemians	Tolka Park, Dublin
20.00 IST

28 September 2013 29	Sligo Rovers	vs	Shelbourne	The Showgrounds, Sligo
19.45 IST

4 October 2013 30	Shelbourne	vs	Drogheda United	Tolka Park, Dublin
20.00 IST

12 October 2013 31	Cork City	vs	Shelbourne	Turners Cross, Cork
17.30 IST

19 October 2013 32	Limerick	vs	Shelbourne	Thomond Park, Limerick
19.45 IST

25 October 2013 33	Shelbourne	vs	UCD	Tolka Park, Dublin
19.45 IST

=== Final table ===
Pos	Team	Pld	W	D	L	GF	GA	GD	Pts	Qualification or relegation
1	St Patrick's Athletic (C)	33	21	8	4	56	20	+36	71	Qualification for Champions League second qualifying round
2	Dundalk	33	21	5	7	55	30	+25	68	Qualification for Europa League first qualifying round
3	Sligo Rovers	33	19	9	5	53	22	+31	66	Qualification for Europa League first qualifying round
4	Derry City	33	17	5	11	57	39	+18	56	Qualification for Europa League first qualifying round
5	Shamrock Rovers	33	13	13	7	43	28	+15	52	
6	Cork City	33	13	7	13	47	50	−3	46	
7	Limerick	33	11	9	13	38	46	−8	42	
8	Drogheda United	33	8	14	11	44	46	−2	38	
9	UCD	33	8	6	19	45	73	−28	30	
10	Bohemians	33	7	8	18	27	47	−20	29	
11	Bray Wanderers (O)	33	7	6	20	33	66	−33	27	Qualification for relegation play-off
12	Shelbourne (R)	33	5	6	22	25	56	−31	21	Relegation for League of Ireland First Division

Rules for classification: 1) points; 2) goal difference; 3) number of goals scored.
(C) Champions; (O) Play-off winners; (R) Relegated

=== Summary ===
Overall								Home						Away					
Pld	W	D	L	GF	GA	GD	Pts	W	D	L	GF	GA	GD	W	D	L	GF	GA	GD
17	2	3	12	9	27	−18	9	1	1	6	5	13	−8	1	2	6	4	14	−10

Last updated: 14 June 2013.
Source: League of Ireland Premier Division Fixtures

=== Form/Results ===
Round	1	2	3	4	5	6	7	8	9	10	11	12	13	14	15	16	17	18	19	20	21	22	23	24	25	26	27	28	29	30	31	32	33
Ground	A	H	A	H	A	H	A	H	A	A	H	H	A	H	A	H	A	H	A	H	H	A	A	H	A	H	A	H	A	H	A	A	H
Result	L	L	D	L	L	L	L	L	D	D	W	L	L	L	L	L	W																
Position	12	12	12	12	12	12	12	12	12	12	12	12	12	12	12	12	12																

Updated to match(es) played on 14 June 2013. Source: League of Ireland Premier Division Fixtures
A = Away; H = Home; W = Win; D = Draw; L = Loss

== Cups ==
=== League of Ireland Cup ===
11 March 2013 First round	Dundalk	1 – 0	Shelbourne	Oriel Park, Dundalk
19.45 IST	Kurtis Byrne 75'	Report		Referee: Paul Tuite (Dublin)

=== Leinster Senior Cup ===
30 April 2013 Fourth Round	Shelbourne	3 - 1	Athlone Town	Tolka Park, Dublin
20:00 IST	Seán Brennan 20', 59'; Ryan 50'	Report	Ryan Combes (yellow card) 20'	Attendance: 184; Referee: (Republic of Ireland) Simon Rogers

== Friendlies ==
4 February 2013	Leixlip United	1 – 2	Shelbourne	Leixlip Amenities Sports Centre, Leixlip
19.45 GMT	Unknown Goalscorer	Report	Philip Hughes; Paul Crowley (pen.)

16 February 2013	Mervue United	1 – 1	Shelbourne	Fahy's Field, Galway
17.30 GMT	Brendan Lavelle 57'	Report	Philip Hughes 38'; Pat Flynn (red card) 17'; Robert Bayly (red card) 33'

19 February 2013	Glebe North	0 – 3	Shelbourne	Market Green, Dublin
19.30 GMT		Report	Philip Hughes; Stephen Sheerin; Darren Tinnelly

23 February 2013	Longford Town	1 – 1	Shelbourne	City Calling Stadium, Longford
19.30 GMT	Mark Salmon 90+1' (pen.)	Report	Craig Mooney 78'

26 February 2013	Shelbourne	3 – 0	St. Joseph's Boys	Tolka Park, Dublin
19.30 GMT	Dean Kelly 38' 56'; Mark Leech 58'	Report

2 March 2013	Wexford Youths	0 – 0	Shelbourne	Ferrycarrig Park, Wexford
14.00 GMT		Report	Pat Flynn (red card)

== Statistics ==
As of October 25, 2013.

=== Player appearances/goals ===
No.	Pos	Nat	Player	Total		Premier Div		FAI Cup		League Cup		Leinster SC	
No.	Pos	Nat	Player	Apps	Goals	Apps	Goals	Apps	Goals	Apps	Goals	Apps	Goals
	DF	(Republic of Ireland) IRL	Paul Andrews	10	2	8	2	1	0	0	0	1	0
	MF	(Republic of Ireland) IRL	Robert Bayly	22	0	18	0	2	0	1	0	1	0
	FW	(Democratic Republic of the Congo) COD	Sven-Beta Biansumba	0	0	0	0	0	0	0	0	0	0
	FW	(Republic of Ireland) IRL	Seán Brennan	35	4	28	2	3	0	1	0	3	2
	GK	(Republic of Ireland) IRL	Niall Burdon	15	0	11	0	2	0	1	0	1	0
	GK	(Republic of Ireland) IRL	Eoin Comerford	0	0	0	0	0	0	0	0	0	0
	MF	(Republic of Ireland) IRL	Dylan Connolly	5	0	5	0	0	0	0	0	0	0
	DF	(Republic of Ireland) IRL	Rob Cornwall	28	0	22	0	2	0	1	0	3	0
	MF	(Republic of Ireland) IRL	Glenn Cronin	14	0	12	0	2	0	0	0	0	0
	MF	(Republic of Ireland) IRL	Paul Crowley	10	0	9	0	0	0	1	0	0	0
	FW	(Republic of Ireland) IRL	Jake Donnelly	2	0	0	0	1	0	0	0	1	0
	DF	(Republic of Ireland) IRL	Derek Doyle	13	1	13	1	0	0	0	0	0	0
	DF	(Republic of Ireland) IRL	Pat Flynn	35	0	29	0	3	0	0	0	3	0
	DF	(Republic of Ireland) IRL	Brian Gannon	9	0	7	0	1	0	0	0	1	0
	DF	(Republic of Ireland) IRL	Graham Gartland	25	1	22	1	2	0	1	0	0	0
	GK	(Republic of Ireland) IRL	Ger Hanley	12	0	9	0	1	0	0	0	2	0
	MF	(Republic of Ireland) IRL	Adam Hanlon	32	2	26	2	3	0	1	0	2	0
	FW	(Republic of Ireland) IRL	Philip Hughes	20	0	17	0	1	0	1	0	1	0
	MF	(Republic of Ireland) IRL	Stephen Hurley	31	1	29	1	2	0	0	0	0	0
	FW	(Republic of Ireland) IRL	Dean Kelly	31	13	26	9	3	3	0	0	2	1
	FW	(Republic of Ireland) IRL	Mark Leech	21	3	17	1	1	1	1	0	2	1
	DF	(Republic of Ireland) IRL	Philip McCabe	2	0	1	0	0	0	0	0	1	0
	MF	(Republic of Ireland) IRL	Jamie McGlynn	6	0	5	0	0	0	0	0	1	0
	DF	(Republic of Ireland) IRL	Jack Memery	15	0	15	0	0	0	0	0	0	0
	MF	(Republic of Ireland) IRL	Craig Mooney	12	0	11	0	0	0	1	0	0	0
	GK	(Republic of Ireland) IRL	Lee Murphy	14	0	14	0	0	0	0	0	0	0
	FW	(Republic of Ireland) IRL	Lee Murtagh	15	3	13	2	2	1	0	0	0	0
	DF	(Republic of Ireland) IRL	Adam O'Connor	7	0	5	0	0	0	0	0	2	0
	MF	(Republic of Ireland) IRL	Garreth O'Connor	4	1	3	0	0	0	0	0	1	1
	MF	(Republic of Ireland) IRL	Alex Prizeman	10	0	7	0	0	0	1	0	2	0
	DF	(Republic of Ireland) IRL	Ian Ryan	31	2	25	1	3	0	1	0	2	1
	MF	(Republic of Ireland) IRL	Stephen Sheerin	11	0	6	0	2	0	0	0	3	0
	DF	(Republic of Ireland) IRL	Brian Shortall	21	1	20	1	0	0	1	0	0	0
	MF	(Republic of Ireland) IRL	Matthew Taylor	1	0	0	0	0	0	0	0	1	0
	FW	(Republic of Ireland) IRL	Darren Tinnelly	22	2	17	2	3	0	0	0	2	0
	GK	(Republic of Ireland) IRL	Charlie Treacy	0	0	0	0	0	0	0	0	0	0
	FW	(Republic of Ireland) IRL	Carl Walshe	4	0	2	0	1	0	0	0	1	0

== See also ==
- 2013 League of Ireland
