= 2013 League of Ireland Cup =

EA Sports Cup

Tournament details
- Country: Republic of Ireland; Northern Ireland
- Teams: 22

Final positions
- Champions: Shamrock Rovers
- Runners-up: Drogheda United

Tournament statistics
- Matches played: 21
- Goals scored: 72 (3.43 per match)

The 2013 League of Ireland Cup, also known as the 2013 EA Sports Cup, is the 40th season of the Irish football knockout competition.

A total of 22 teams have entered the 2013 competition. The 12 League of Ireland Premier Division and 8 League of Ireland First Division clubs were joined by Ulster Senior League runners up Cockhill Celtic and the Mayo League representative side. For the First and Second rounds of the competition, all participating clubs will be split into 4 regional pools while the further rounds of the competitions will have an open draw. The 2013 competition will commence with the first round on 2 March 2013.

== Teams ==
Pool 1	Pool 2	Pool 3	Pool 4
Cork City; Cobh Ramblers; Limerick; Waterford United; Wexford Youths	Cockhill Celtic; Derry City; Finn Harps; Mayo League; Mervue United; Sligo Rovers	Bohemians; Bray Wanderers; Salthill Devon; St Patrick's Athletic; UCD	Athlone Town; Drogheda United; Dundalk; Longford Town; Shamrock Rovers; Shelbourne

== First round ==
The draw for the first round took place on 30 January 2013. The first-round games were played on the 2, 3, 11 and 19 March 2013.

Team 1	Score	Team 2
Pool 1
Waterford United	2–1	Cobh Ramblers|| Report
Pool 2
Mayo League	1–4	Finn Harps|| Report
Mervue United	2–1	Cockhill Celtic|| Report
Pool 3
Bohemians	3 – 2 (a.e.t.)	UCD|| Report
Pool 4
Athlone Town	0–2	Longford Town|| Report
Dundalk	1–0	Shelbourne|| Report

== Second round ==
The draw for the second round took place on 3 April 2013. The second-round games were played on the 20 and 21 May 2013.

Team 1	Score	Team 2
Pool 1
Limerick	1 – 1 (a.e.t.) (4–2p)	Waterford United
Wexford Youths	0–4	Cork City
Pool 2
Finn Harps	1 – 1 (a.e.t.) (5–6p)	Derry City
Sligo Rovers	4–0	Mervue United
Pool 3
Bohemians	4 – 2 (a.e.t.)	Bray Wanderers
Salthill Devon	2 – 3 (a.e.t.)	St. Patrick's Athletic
Pool 4
Drogheda United	6–0	Longford Town
Shamrock Rovers	1–0	Dundalk

== Quarter-finals ==
The draw for the quarter-finals was made on 10 June 2013. All of the remaining teams play in the League of Ireland Premier Division; this had not happened since 2005. The tie between Shamrock Rovers and St. Patrick's Athletic was postponed from 1 July due to the latter club travelling to Lithuania for a Europa League fixture.

1 July 2013	Drogheda United	3–0	Cork City	Hunky Dorys Park
19:45	Marks 24'; McNally 43'; R. Brennan 45' (pen.)	Report		Attendance: 320; Referee: Paul Tuite

1 July 2013	Limerick	0–4	Sligo Rovers	Thomond Park
19:45		Report	26' Henderson; 38' Peers; 50' North; 77' McMillan	Attendance: 913; Referee: Anthony Buttimer

1 July 2013	Bohemians	0–2	Derry City	Dalymount Park
19:45		Report	82', 90+1' Duffy	Attendance: 543; Referee: Paul McLaughlin

23 July 2013	Shamrock Rovers	2–1 (a.e.t.)	St. Patrick's Athletic	Tallaght Stadium
	Quigley 52'; Dennehy 108'	Report	79' C. Byrne	Attendance: 1,200; Referee: Tom Connolly

== Semi-finals ==
The draw for the quarter-finals was made on 8 July 2013.

5 August 2013	Derry City	1–3	Drogheda United	Brandywell Stadium
19:45	McLaid 38'	Report	D. O'Brien 12', 77'; D. Cassidy 66'	Attendance: 990; Referee: Paul Tuite

13 August 2013	Shamrock Rovers	3–2	Sligo Rovers	Tallaght Stadium
20:00	Sheppard 17'; McCabe 27', 71'	Report	1' Djilali; 82' Elding	Attendance: 1,500; Referee: Paul McLaughlin

== Final ==
The final, which was broadcast live on Setanta Sports, took place at Tallaght Stadium, the home ground of finalists Shamrock Rovers, on 21 September 2013. The 2012 League of Ireland Cup Final was also contested by Drogheda United and Shamrock Rovers at Tallaght Stadium. Shamrock Rovers won the game 2–0 with a penalty from Gary McCabe in the 11th minute and Thomas Stewart scoring the second in the 58th minute when he slotted the ball past the goalkeeper after a pass by Paul O'Connor.

21 September 2013
18:00

Drogheda United	0–2	Shamrock Rovers
Prendergast (red card) 86'	Report	McCabe 11' (pen.); Stewart 58'; Oman (yellow card) 51' (yellow-red card) 69'

Tallaght Stadium, Dublin
Attendance: 3,820
Referee: Padraigh Sutton
