= 2012 Dundalk F.C. season =

Dundalk F.C.
2012 season
- Chairman: Padraig McGowan
- Manager: Sean McCaffrey
- Stadium: Oriel Park
- Premier Division: 11th
- FAI Cup: Semi-finals
- League of Ireland Cup: Quarter-finals
- Leinster Senior Cup: First round
Home colours	Away colours	Third colours

The 2012 season was Dundalk's fourth successive season in the League of Ireland Premier Division following promotion in 2008. All together, it was the club's 86th season in League of Ireland football. The club was managed by Sean McCaffrey, who was in his first season in charge. The club also competed in the FAI Cup, League of Ireland Cup and the Leinster Senior Cup. Dundalk finished the 33-round season in 11th position, requiring them to play a promotion/relegation play-off against Waterford United of the First Division; a tie which they won on aggregate, thus retaining their place in the Premier Division for the 2013 season. Results against Monaghan United F.C. were expunged, after they withdrew from the League mid-season.

The club spent the season battling financial problems, which threatened to put the club of business altogether. Manager Sean McCaffrey resigned in July with the club rooted to the bottom of the table and financial losses mounting. He was replaced by his assistant, Darius Kierans, in a caretaker role. The club's owner, Gerry Matthews put the club up for sale, and with the assistance of a Supporters Trust, it was taken over by local businessmen Andy Connolly and Paul Brown (owners of the team's official sponsors, Fastfix) before the end of the season.

== 2012 Fixtures and results ==
=== Premier Division ===
2 March 2012 Round 1	Monaghan United	Expunged	Dundalk

9 March 2012 Round 2	Dundalk	0–2	St Patrick's Athletic	Oriel Park, Dundalk
		Report	S. O'Flynn 9'; J. Russell 53'	Attendance: 1,500 (estimated); Referee: Paul McLaughlin

16 March 2012 Round 3	Drogheda United	0–0	Dundalk	Hunky Dorys Park, Drogheda
	Paul Crowley (yellow card) 69' (yellow-red card); Eric Foley (yellow card) 77' (yellow-red card)			Attendance: 1,287; Referee: Rob Rogers

23 March 2012 Round 4	Dundalk	2–1	UCD	Oriel Park, Dundalk
	C. Shields 51'; S. O'Neill 55'	Report	G. Rusk 67' (pen.)	Attendance: 925; Referee: Derek Tomney

31 March 2012 Round 5	Sligo Rovers	3–0	Dundalk	The Showgrounds, Sligo
19:45 IWT	D. North 48', 90'; G. Peers 54'	Report		Attendance: 2.586; Referee: Paul McLaughlin

6 April 2012 Round 6	Dundalk	0–0	Shelbourne	Oriel Park, Dundalk
19.45 IST		Report		Attendance: 1,362; Referee: Rob Rogers (Dublin)

13 April 2012 Round 7	Shamrock Rovers	6–0	Dundalk	Tallaght Stadium, Tallaght
20:00	C. Turner 31'; G. Twigg 33', 81', 87'; B. Dennehy 46'; D. Kavanagh 90+1'	Report		Attendance: 3,200; Referee: Graham Kelly

20 April 2012 Round 8	Derry City	1–2	Dundalk	The Brandywell, Derry
	R. Higgins 84'	Report	M. Rafter 14'; S. O'Neill 52'; C. Shields (red card) 90'	Attendance: 1,500 (estimated); Referee: Damien Hancock

27 April 2012 Round 9	Dundalk	0–2	Bohemians	Oriel Park, Dundalk
19:45 IST (UTC+1)		Report	R. McEvoy 26'; P. McMahon 70'	Attendance: 903; Referee: Richie Winter

4 May 2012 Round 10	Cork City	3–2	Dundalk	Turners Cross, Cork
	D. O'Neill 3', 14'; V. Sullivan 50'	Report	M. Rafter 8'; G. Shanahan 12'	Attendance: 2,815; Referee: Padraigh Sutton

11 May 2012 Round 11	Dundalk	0–2	Bray Wanderers	Oriel Park, Dundalk
19:45 IST		(Report)	J. Byrne 40' (pen.), 73' (pen.)	Attendance: 700; Referee: Paul Tuite

18 May 2012 Round 12	Dundalk	Expunged	Monaghan United

21 May 2012 Round 13	St Patrick's Athletic	1–2	Dundalk	Richmond Park, Inchicore
	C. Forrester 43'	Report	M. Rafter (red card) 45'; M. Griffin 78', 90+2'	Attendance: 1,090; Referee: Graham Kelly

1 June 2012 Round 14	Dundalk	1–2	Drogheda United	Oriel Park, Dundalk
	G. Shanahan 63'	Report	S. Brennan 43'; P. Crowley 66'; E. Foley (yellow card) 90' (yellow-red card)	Attendance: 700 (estimated); Referee: Paul Tuite

22 June 2012 Round 15	UCD	1–1	Dundalk	UCD Bowl
	R. Benson 49'	Report	N. Murphy 35'	Attendance: 158; Referee: Paul McLaughlin

29 June 2012 Round 16	Dundalk	1–2	Sligo Rovers	Oriel Park, Dundalk
19:45 IWT	M. Rafter 36'	Report	D. North 43', 49'	Attendance: 500; Referee: Dave McKeon

6 July 2012 Round 17	Shelbourne	4–0	Dundalk	Tolka Park, Dublin
20.00 IST	P. Gorman 30', 52 ' K. Dawson 64'; B. McLaughlin 71' (o.g.)	Report		Attendance: 801; Referee: Alan Kelly

13 July 2012 Round 18	Dundalk	1–1	Shamrock Rovers	Oriel Park, Dundalk
19:45	G. Shanahan 18'	Report	D. Kavanagh 61'	Attendance: 1,319; Referee: Tom Connolly

20 July 2012 Round 19	Dundalk	1–1	Derry City	Oriel Park, Dundalk
	C. Shields 85'	Report	D. McDaid 73'	Attendance: 1,139; Referee: Paul McLaughlin

27 July 2012 Round 20	Bohemians	2–1	Dundalk	Dalymount Park, Phibsboro
19:45	E. McMillan 35', 45'	Report	M. Rafter 70'	Attendance: 1,158; Referee: Graham Kelly

3 August 2012 Round 21	Dundalk	1–1	Cork City	Oriel Park, Dundalk
	G. Shanahan 60'	Report	I. Turner 21'	Attendance: 1,007; Referee: Damien Hancock

10 August Round 22	Bray Wanderers	1–1	Dundalk	Carlisle Grounds, Bray
19:45 IST	David Webster 90+4'	(Report)	Gary Shanahan 54'	Referee: Derek Tomney

17 August 2012 Round 23	Monaghan United	Cancelled	Dundalk

20 August 2012 Round 24	Dundalk	0–1	St Patrick's Athletic	Oriel Park, Dundalk
		Report	J. Kelly 90+1'	Attendance: 1,000 (estimated); Referee: Paul Tuite

31 August 2012 Round 25	Drogheda United	3–2	Dundalk	Hunky Dorys Park, Drogheda
	P. Hynes 31', 87'; J. Sullivan 90+1'	Report	M. Griffin 5', 25'	Attendance: 933; Referee: Anthony Buttimer

7 September 2012 Round 26	Dundalk	1–2	UCD	Oriel Park, Dundalk
	M. Rafter 56'	Report	D. McMillan 30', 80' (pen.)	Attendance: 800 (estimated); Referee: Damien Hancock

10 September 2012 Round 27	Sligo Rovers	3–0	Dundalk	The Showgrounds, Sligo
19:45 IWT	M. Quigley 10'; G. Peers 49'; L. Buchanan 86'	Report		Attendance: 3,265; Referee: Tom Connolly

21 September 2012 Round 28	Dundalk	0–1	Shelbourne	Oriel Park, Dundalk
19.45 IST	Marc Griffin (red card) 87'	Report	Paddy Kavanagh 41'	Referee: Graham Kelly

28 September 2012 Round 29	Shamrock Rovers	7–0	Dundalk	Tallaght Stadium, Tallaght
	R. Finn 27'; K. Oman 29'; C. Kilduff 45+2'; G. McCabe 57' (pen.), 66' (pen.); G. Twigg 70', 72'	Report		Attendance: 1,200 (estimated); Referee: Damien Hancock

5 October 2012 Round 30	Derry City	4–0	Dundalk	The Brandywell, Derry
19:45	D. McDaid 31'; P. McEleney 48'; R. Curran 82'; D. McCaffrey 89'	Report		Referee: Rob Rogers

13 October 2012 Round 31	Dundalk	2–2	Bohemians	Oriel Park, Dundalk
	S. Maher 26'; B. McKenna 84'	Report	E. McMillan 47'; D. Corcoran 75'	Attendance: 250 (estimated); Referee: Dave McKeon

19 October 2012 Round 32	Cork City	3–0	Dundalk	Turners Cross, Cork
	G. Morrissey 23'; V. Sullivan 28'; S. Duggan 49'	Report		Attendance: 2,782; Referee: Padraigh Sutton

26 October 2012 Round 33	Dundalk	2–1	Bray Wanderers	Oriel Park, Dundalk
19:45 IST	M. Rafter 51'; B. Conlon 51'	(Report)	K. Waters 70'	Attendance: 260; Referee: Derek Tomney

==== Final Table ====
Pos	Team	Pld	W	D	L	GF	GA	GD	Pts	Qualification or relegation
1	Sligo Rovers (C)	30	17	10	3	53	23	+30	61	Qualification for Champions League second qualifying round
2	Drogheda United	30	17	6	7	51	36	+15	57	Qualification for Europa League first qualifying round
3	St Patrick's Athletic	30	15	10	5	44	22	+22	55	Qualification for Europa League first qualifying round
4	Shamrock Rovers	30	14	10	6	56	37	+19	52	
5	Derry City	30	11	6	13	36	36	0	39	Qualification for Europa League second qualifying round (Note: Derry City qualified for the UEFA Europa League second qualifying round after winning the 2012 FAI Cup Final.)
6	Cork City	30	8	12	10	38	36	+2	36	
7	Bohemians	30	9	9	12	35	38	−3	36	
8	Shelbourne	30	9	8	13	35	43	−8	35	
9	UCD	30	8	7	15	32	48	−16	31	
10	Bray Wanderers	30	5	10	15	33	54	−21	25	
11	Dundalk (O)	30	4	8	18	23	63	−40	20	Qualification for relegation play-off
12	Monaghan United (R)	0	0	0	0	0	0	0	0	Withdrew from league (Note: Monaghan United withdrew after 14 games. Their record was expunged.)

(C) Champions; (O) Play-off winners; (R) Relegated

==== Promotion/relegation play-off ====
30 October 2012 1st leg	Dundalk	2–2	Waterford United	Oriel Park, Dundalk
	L. Shannon 22'; S. Maher (red card) 33'; S. McDonnell 75'	Report	P. Phelan 49'; B. Ryan 60'	Attendance: 1,500 (estimated); Referee: Paul McLaughlin

2 November 2012 2nd leg	Waterford United	0–2	Dundalk	Waterford Regional Sports Centre, Waterford
		Report	M. Rafter 45', 69'	Attendance: 2,728; Referee: Padraigh Sutton

Dundalk won the play-off 4–2 on aggregate and remained in the Premier Division

=== FAI Cup ===
25 May 2012 2nd Round	Dundalk	1–0	St. Patrick's CYFC	Oriel Park, Dundalk
	J. Mountney 49'	Report	S. Dunne (red card) 88'	Attendance: 300 (estimated); Referee: Tom Connolly

24 August 2012 3rd Round	Malahide United	0–4	Dundalk	Gannon Park
		Report	G. Shanahan 9'; M. Griffin 45+1'; L. Shannon 75'; B. McKenna 90'	Attendance: 450; Referee: James McKell

14 September 2012 Quarter-finals	Bohemians	0–1	Dundalk	Dalymount Park, Phibsborough
		Report	M. Griffin 75'	Attendance: 1,108; Referee: Derek Tomney

7 October 2012 Semi-finals	Dundalk	0–3	St Patrick's Athletic	Oriel Park, Dundalk
		Report	K. Browne 20'; G. Bolger 52'; S. O'Connor 85'	Attendance: 2,035; Referee: Alan Kelly

=== League of Ireland Cup ===
10 April 2012 2nd Round	Longford Town	1–2	Dundalk	Flancare Park, Longford
	S. Skelly 3'	Report	G. Shanahan 22', 53'	Attendance: 300 (estimated); Referee: Richie Winter

25 June 2012 Quarter-finals	Drogheda United	1–1 (3–2 p)	Dundalk	Hunky Dorys Park
	E. Foley 33'	Report	M. Griffin 58'	Referee: Derek Tomney
	Penalties
	E. Foley (penalty scored); R. Brennan (penalty scored); P. Hynes (penalty missed); D. Marshall (penalty missed); G. Brennan (penalty scored)		(penalty missed) J. Mountney; (penalty missed) S. O'Neill; (penalty scored) C. Shields; (penalty scored) P. Walsh; (penalty missed) M. Griffin

=== Leinster Senior Cup ===
19 March 2012	Crumlin United	1–0	Dundalk	Captain's Road
	D. Griffin 11'	Report
