= Ger Hanley =

Irish footballer (born 1991)

Personal information
- Full name: Gerard Hanley
- Date of birth: 4 April 1991 (age 35)
- Place of birth: Galway, Ireland
- Height: 1.86 m (6 ft 1 in)
- Position: Goalkeeper

Youth career
- Knocknacarra
- –2008: Salthill Devon

Senior career*
Years	Team	Apps	(Gls)
2008–2009	Galway United	0	(0)
2010–2011	Mervue United	54	(0)
2012	Dundalk	1	(0)
2012	Mervue United	5	(0)
2013	Shelbourne	9	(0)
2013	Mervue United	1	(0)
2014–2015	Galway United	15	(0)
Total		85	(0)

International career
2005	Republic of Ireland U15		
2007–2008	Republic of Ireland U17		
2008–2009	Republic of Ireland U19		
- * Club domestic league appearances and goals

Gerard Hanley (born 4 April 1991) is an Irish former professional footballer who played as a goalkeeper.

Hanley played youth football with Knocknacarra and Salthill Devon before starting his professional career with Galway United. Hanley go on to have multiple stints with Mervue United, as well as spells with Dundalk, Shelbourne and a second spell with Galway United.

Hanley is a former Republic of Ireland youth international.

== Youth career ==
Hanley played youth football with Knocknacarra and Salthill Devon.

In a 2012 interview, Hanley stated that he had turned down an opportunity to play professionally in Scotland.

== Club career ==
=== Galway United ===
On 13 April 2009, Hanley made his debut for League of Ireland Premier Division side Galway United in a League of Ireland Cup game against the team he played youth football with, Salthill Devon.

=== Mervue United ===
Hanley signed for League of Ireland First Division club Mervue United ahead of the 2010 season.

On 19 August 2011, Hanley saved a penalty in a game against Cork City, however Cork striker Graham Cummins scored the rebound.

=== Dundalk ===
On 27 January 2012, Hanley was signed for League of Ireland Premier Division side Dundalk by manager Sean McCaffrey, who had previously managed Hanley for the Republic of Ireland U17s and U19s.

On 10 April 2012, Hanley made his debut for Dundalk as they won 2–1 against Longford Town in the League of Ireland Cup. On 22 June 2012 Hanley made his league debut for Dundalk against UCD at the UCD Bowl, however Hanley had to be withdrawn for Peter Cherrie after only 28 minutes due to an injury.

=== Return to Mervue United ===
Hanley returned to Mervue United for the second half of the 2012 season. On 21 September 2012, Hanley played his first game back with the club in a victory over Athlone Town.

=== Shelbourne ===
On 15 January 2013, Hanley signed for Premier Division side Shelbourne ahead of the 2013 season.

=== Third spell with Mervue United ===
Hanley once again returned to Mervue as they were chasing promotion in the second half of 2013 season. That season Mervue made it to the play-offs facing Longford Town, where they would lose on penalties.

=== Return to Galway United ===
Hnaley joined the newly formed Galway FC ahead of the 2014 season, where he would rotate with Connor Gleeson.

Hanley re-signed with the renamed Galway United for the 2015 season, where he would be competing for a starting spot with Connor Gleeson, Kevin Horgan and Conor Winn.

That season Galway made it to the League of Ireland Cup semi-finals, where they faced Hanley's former club Dundalk. Hanley saved two penalties to get Galway to the 2015 League of Ireland Cup final.

== International career ==
Hanley was the starting goalkeeper for the Republic of Ireland U17s at the 2008 UEFA European Under-17 Championship.

== Career statistics ==
=== Club ===
Appearances and goals by club, season and competition
Club	Season	League			National cup (Note: Includes FAI Cup)		League cup (Note: Includes League of Ireland Cup)		Other		Total	
Club	Season	Division	Apps	Goals	Apps	Goals	Apps	Goals	Apps	Goals	Apps	Goals
Galway United	2008	LOI Premier Division	0	0	0	0	0	0	—		0	0
Galway United	2009	LOI Premier Division	0	0	0	0	1	0	—		1	0
Galway United	Total		0	0	0	0	1	0	0	0	1	0
Mervue United	2010	LOI First Division	29	0	2	0	0	0	—		31	0
Mervue United	2011	LOI First Division	25	0	0	0	2	0	—		27	0
Mervue United	Total		54	0	2	0	2	0	0	0	58	0
Dundalk	2012	LOI Premier Division	1	0	0	0	1	0	0	0	2	0
Mervue United	2012	LOI First Division	5	0	0	0	0	0	0	0	5	0
Shelbourne	2013	LOI Premier Division	9	0	1	0	0	0	2 (Note: Appearances in Leinster Senior Cup)	0	12	0
Mervue United	2013	LOI First Division	1	0	0	0	0	0	0	0	1	0
Galway United	2014	LOI First Division	6	0	1	0	2	0	—		9	0
Galway United	2015	LOI Premier Division	9	0	1	0	2	0	—		12	0
Galway United	Total		15	0	2	0	4	0	0	0	21	0
Career total			85	0	5	0	8	0	2	0	100	0

== Honours ==
Galway United

- League of Ireland Cup; runner up: 2015
