= 2010 FAI Cup =

FAI Ford Cup

Tournament details
- Country: Republic of Ireland
- Teams: 47

Final positions
- Champions: Sligo Rovers
- Runners-up: Shamrock Rovers

Tournament statistics
- Matches played: 56
- Goals scored: 154 (2.75 per match)
- Top goal scorer(s): James Chambers; Paddy Madden; Shane O'Neill (4 Goals)

The 2010 FAI Senior Challenge Cup, also known as the 2010 FAI Ford Cup, is the 90th season of the national football competition of the Republic of Ireland.

The competition was won by Sligo Rovers who defeated Shamrock Rovers in the final on 14 November 2010 at the Aviva Stadium, Dublin.

A total of 47 teams competed in the 2010 competition which commenced on the weekend ending Sunday 21 March 2010. The 22 teams entered from the League of Ireland Premier and First divisions received byes into the third round stage while the remaining 25 teams entered at the First and Second round stages with 15 of these 25 teams receiving byes into the second round. These 25 teams composed of 5 League of Ireland A Championship clubs, 16 Intermediate clubs and 4 Junior clubs. As winners of the competition, Sligo Rovers earned spots in both the third qualifying round of the 2011–12 UEFA Europa League and the 2011 Setanta Sports Cup.

== First round ==
The draw for the first round took place on 10 March 2010. Fixtures were played weekend ending, Sunday 21 March 2010.

Tie no	Home team	Score	Away team	Report
1	Tolka Rovers	2–1	Wayside Celtic	
2	Crumlin United	1–0	Drogheda Town	
3	Dublin Bus	4–1	Cobh Ramblers	
4	Cherry Orchard	1–1	Tullamore Town	
Replay	Tullamore Town	4–1	Cherry Orchard	
5	Bonagee United	2–1	Clonmel Town	Report

== Second round ==
The draw for the second round took place on 10 March 2010. Fixtures were played weekend ending, Sunday 16 May 2010.

Tie no	Home team	Score	Away team	Report
1	Tullamore Town	2–1	Fairview Rangers	
2	Malahide United	2–0	Douglas Hall	
3	Fanad United	1–2	Dublin Bus	Report
4	Bluebell United	2–1	St. Michael's	
5	Rockmount	1–2	Avondale United	
6	Bonagee United	1–1	Crumlin United	Report
Replay	Crumlin United	1–0	Bonagee United	
7	Regional United	0–2	Belgrove	
8	Glenville	1–0	UCC	
9	Tralee Dynamos	2–2	Tolka Rovers	Report
Replay	Tolka Rovers	3–0	Tralee Dynamos	Report
10	F.C. Carlow	1–0	Castlebar Celtic	

== Third round ==
The draw for the third round took place on 17 May 2010 on Monday Night Soccer. Fixtures were played weekend ending, Sunday 6 June 2010.

Tie no	Home team	Score	Away team	Report
1	Glenville	1–7	Bohemians	Report
2	Dublin Bus	0–2	Shelbourne	Report
3	Drogheda United	1–2	UCD	Report
4	Cork City	1–1	Bluebell United	Report
Replay	Bluebell United	0–1	Cork City	Report
5	Longford Town	1–0	Waterford United	Report
6	Limerick	3–1	Tolka Rovers	Report
7	Galway United	5–0	Malahide United	Report
8	Shamrock Rovers	5–1	Wexford Youths	Report
9	Derry City	1–1	Bray Wanderers	Report
Replay	Bray Wanderers	3–2	Derry City	Report
10	Tullamore Town	1–3	Salthill Devon	Report
11	Finn Harps	3–0	Crumlin United	Report
12	FC Carlow	1–1	Monaghan United	Report
Replay	Monaghan United	2–1	FC Carlow	Report
13	Dundalk	0–1	St. Patrick's Athletic	Report
14	Belgrove	2–1	Avondale United	Report
15	Sporting Fingal	1–1	Mervue United	Report
Replay	Mervue United	0–4	Sporting Fingal	Report
16	Sligo Rovers	1–0	Athlone Town	Report

== Fourth round ==
The draw for the fourth round took place on 7 June 2010 on Monday Night Soccer. Fixtures were played Friday 27 August 2010.

Tie no	Home team	Score	Away team	Report
1	Galway United	1–1	Salthill Devon	Report
Replay	Salthill Devon	1–3	Galway United	Report
2	UCD	2–3	Bray Wanderers	Report
3	Finn Harps	0–1	Sligo Rovers	Report
4	Bohemians	1–0	Shelbourne	Report
5	Cork City	0–1	Monaghan United	Report
6	Longford Town	1–2	Shamrock Rovers	Report
7	St. Patrick's Athletic	2–0	Belgrove	Report
8	Sporting Fingal	2–2	Limerick	Report
Replay	Limerick	0–0; AET	Sporting Fingal	Report
Sporting Fingal won 4–3 on penalties

== Quarter-finals ==
The draw for the quarter-finals took place on 30 August 2010 on Monday Night Soccer.

17 September 2010
19.45 IST

Bohemians	3–0	Bray Wanderers
Mark Quigley 21'; Raffaele Cretaro 53'; Aaron Greene 79'	Report	Shane O'Connor (red card) 56'

Dalymount Park, Dublin
Attendance: 1,260
Referee: Neil Doyle (Dublin)

18 September 2010
13.00 IST

St. Patrick's Athletic	3–1	Sporting Fingal
Ryan Guy 22'; Damian Lynch 52'; Vinny Faherty 86'	Report	Shaun Williams 53'

Richmond Park, Dublin
Attendance: 759
Referee: Richie Winter (Dublin)

17 September 2010
20.00 IST

Shamrock Rovers	6–0	Galway United
Thomas Stewart 12'; Rhys Meynell 23' (o.g.); James Chambers 33', 65'; Seamus Conneely 67' (o.g.); Dessie Baker 78'	Report	Barry Ryan (red card) 12'

Tallaght Stadium, Dublin
Attendance: 4,600
Referee: Anthony Buttimer (Cork)

18 September 2010
19.45 IST

Sligo Rovers	3–0	Monaghan United
Alan Keane 24' (pen.); Romuald Boco 46'; Mark McGoldrick 90+3'	Report

The Showgrounds, Sligo
Attendance: 4,000
Referee: Padraig Sutton (Clare)

== Semi-finals ==
The draw for the semi-finals took place on 20 September 2010 on Monday Night Soccer.

15 October 2010
20.05 IST

Bohemians	0–1	Sligo Rovers
	Report	Gavin Peers 75'

Dalymount Park, Dublin
Attendance: 4,500
Referee: Alan Kelly (Cork)

17 October 2010
15.15 IST

Shamrock Rovers	2–2	St. Patrick's Athletic
Chris Turner 16'; Gary Twigg 64'	Report	David McAllister 31'; Paddy Kavanagh 90' (o.g.)

Tallaght Stadium, Dublin
Attendance: 6,800
Referee: Tomás Connolly (Dublin)

=== Replay ===
19 October 2010
19.45 IST

St. Patrick's Athletic	0–1	Shamrock Rovers
Damian Lynch (red card) 53'	Report	Chris Turner 70'

Richmond Park, Dublin
Attendance: 4,200
Referee: Tomás Connolly (Dublin)

== Final ==
14 November 2010
15.30 GMT

Sligo Rovers	0–0 (a.e.t.)	Shamrock Rovers
	Report	Stephen Bradley (red card) 111'
Penalties
Eoin Doyle (penalty scored); Alan Keane (penalty missed); Conor O'Grady (penalty missed); Gary McCabe (penalty scored)	2–0	(penalty missed) Gary Twigg; (penalty missed) Pat Flynn; (penalty missed) Chris Turner; (penalty missed) Paddy Kavanagh

Aviva Stadium, Dublin
Attendance: 36,101
Referee: Tomás Connolly (Dublin)
