= Gavin Peers =

Irish footballer

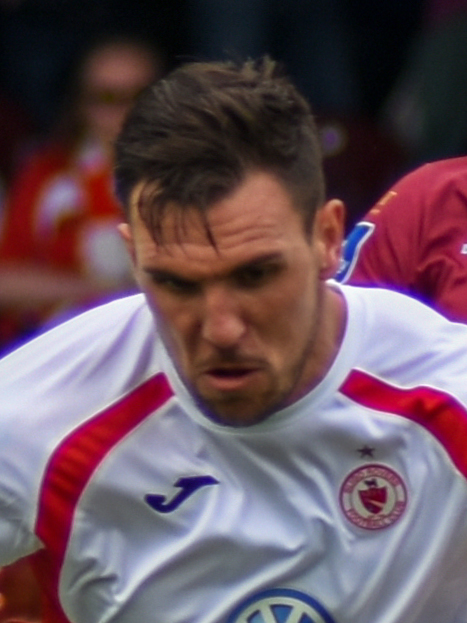
- Peers in action for Sligo Rovers away to Galway United in 2016

Personal information
- Full name: Gavin Peers
- Date of birth: 10 November 1985 (age 41)
- Place of birth: Dublin, Ireland
- Position: Centre back

Youth career
- 2002–2005: Blackburn Rovers

Senior career*
| Years | Team | Apps | (Gls) |
| 2005–2006 | Mansfield Town | 13 | (2) |
| 2006–2016 | Sligo Rovers | 275 | (19) |
| 2017 | St Patrick's Athletic | 19 | (0) |
| 2018 | Derry City | 19 | (0) |
| 2019–2020 | Glentoran | 40 | (1) |
| 2020–2022 | Warrenpoint Town | 17 | (0) |

International career
| 2010 | Republic of Ireland U23 | 2 | (1) |
| 2010 | League of Ireland XI | 1 | (0) |

Managerial career
- 2026–: Home Farm
- * Club domestic league appearances and goals

Gavin Peers (born 10 November 1985) is an Irish football coach and former player who is the current manager of FAI National League side Home Farm.

== Career ==
Peers started his footballing career at Blackburn Rovers, and later moved to Mansfield Town, where he made 30 total appearances. He was signed for Sligo Rovers by Sean Connor following the club's promotion to the Premier Division and played regularly at right-back that year. The following year following the departure of centre-backs Michael McNamara and Liam Burns Peers moved into the centre of defence. Injuries forced him to miss much of the 2009 League of Ireland season and his presence was badly missed. He did recover in time to take his place in the team for the 2009 FAI Cup Final, but it would end in disappointment with Sporting Fingal winning 2–1.

The following year was much better with Peers playing consistently and Sligo having a fantastic season that saw him play in both the FAI Cup and League of Ireland Cup finals. He played a major role in the 2010 FAI Cup victory by scoring the winning goal in the 1-0 semi-final win over Bohemians at Dalymount Park. Following the departure of Conor O'Grady at the end of the 2010 season Peers became the club's longest serving player.

Sligo Rovers repeated the FAI Cup success in 2011 this time beating Shelbourne in the final. Peers had one of his most consistent seasons making a career-best 46 appearances over the season. The next season brought even more success as Sligo won the league title with the centre-back pairing of Peers and Jason McGuinness a major part of the success.

He scored against FC Spartak Trnava in the 2012–13 UEFA Europa League.

2013 brought FAI Cup glory again but this time the final would be a bittersweet occasion for Peers as he suffered a cruciate knee ligament injury. Despite this he signed a new two-year contract at the end of the season which kept him at the club for 10 seasons. He has made the 5th most appearances in the history of the club.

Peers was awarded a testimonial by Sligo where he scored in a 3-3- draw with Portsmouth F.C. in July 2016 .

After 346 appearances in 11 seasons at The Showgrounds, Peers departed for Dublin side St Patrick's Athletic for the 2017 season. His signing was announced by manager Liam Buckley at the club's 2016 Awards Night on 19 November 2016. Peers scored two brilliant diving headers on his Pats debut, scoring the first two goals in a 5–0 pre-season friendly win over Bluebell United at John Hyland Park on 24 January 2017. He made his competitive Pats debut seven days later as Pats beat Bray Wanderers 4–0 in the Leinster Senior Cup at the Carlisle Grounds, with Peers coming off injured in the 45th minute while 3–0 up at the time.

Peers signed for Glentoran of the NIFL Premiership in January 2019.

He signed for Warrenpoint Town F.C. in August 2020 where he spent two seasons before retiring.

== International career ==
Peers, a former youth international was selected by Pat Fenlon for the Republic of Ireland national under-23 football team in 2007 and on his only appearance scored the opening goal against Slovakia.

In 2010, he was selected for the League of Ireland XI for the opening game at the Aviva Stadium.

== Managerial career ==
In December 2022, Peers was announced as first-team coach at Longford Town in a role he remained at until resigning in April 2024.

On 26 July 2026, Peers was appointed manager of Home Farm for the first season of the newly formed FAI National League.

== Personal life ==
Peers is the nephew of Irish international and former Liverpool midfielder, Ronnie Whelan.

== Honours ==
Sligo Rovers

- League of Ireland (1): 2012
- FAI Cup (3): 2010, 2011, 2013
- League of Ireland Cup (1): 2010
- Setanta Sports Cup (1): 2014

Glentoran

- Irish Cup (1): 2019-20

== Career statistics ==
Professional appearances – correct as of 7 January 2020.

| Club | Season | League | | | National Cup | | League Cup | | Europe | | Other | | Total | |
| Club | Season | Division | Apps | Goals | Apps | Goals | Apps | Goals | Apps | Goals | Apps | Goals | Apps | Goals |
|---|---|---|---|---|---|---|---|---|---|---|---|---|---|---|
| Mansfield Town | 2005–06 | EFL League Two | 13 | 2 | 2 | 0 | 0 | 0 | — | | 0 (Note: Appearances in EFL Trophy) | 0 | 15 | 2 |
| Sligo Rovers | 2006 | League of Ireland Premier Division | 26 | 0 | 6 | 1 | 1 | 0 | — | | — | | 33 | 1 |
| Sligo Rovers | 2007 | League of Ireland Premier Division | 23 | 0 | 3 | 0 | 1 | 0 | — | | — | | 27 | 0 |
| Sligo Rovers | 2008 | League of Ireland Premier Division | 28 | 2 | 1 | 0 | 1 | 0 | — | | — | | 30 | 2 |
| Sligo Rovers | 2009 | League of Ireland Premier Division | 27 | 3 | 5 | 1 | 2 | 0 | 0 (Note: Appearances in UEFA Europa League) | 0 | — | | 34 | 4 |
| Sligo Rovers | 2010 | League of Ireland Premier Division | 31 | 4 | 5 | 1 | 4 | 0 | 0 | 0 | 3 (Note: Appearances in Setanta Sports Cup) | 0 | 43 | 5 |
| Sligo Rovers | 2011 | League of Ireland Premier Division | 32 | 3 | 5 | 1 | 3 | 0 | 2 | 0 | 4 | 0 | 46 | 4 |
| Sligo Rovers | 2012 | League of Ireland Premier Division | 28 | 4 | 1 | 0 | 1 | 0 | 2 | 1 | 4 | 0 | 36 | 5 |
| Sligo Rovers | 2013 | League of Ireland Premier Division | 26 | 2 | 4 | 1 | 2 | 1 | 2 (Note: Appearances in UEFA Champions League) | 0 | 3 | 0 | 37 | 4 |
| Sligo Rovers | 2014 | League of Ireland Premier Division | 11 | 0 | 0 | 0 | 0 | 0 | 1 | 0 | 0 | 0 | 12 | 0 |
| Sligo Rovers | 2015 | League of Ireland Premier Division | 24 | 1 | 3 | 0 | 1 | 0 | — | | — | | 28 | 1 |
| Sligo Rovers | 2016 | League of Ireland Premier Division | 18 | 0 | 2 | 0 | 0 | 0 | — | | — | | 20 | 0 |
| Sligo Rovers | Sligo Rovers Total | | 274 | 19 | 35 | 5 | 16 | 1 | 7 | 1 | 24 | 0 | 346 | 26 |
| St Patrick's Athletic | 2017 | League of Ireland Premier Division | 19 | 0 | 0 | 0 | 2 | 0 | — | | 1 (Note: Appearances in Leinster Senior Cup) | 0 | 22 | 0 |
| Derry City | 2018 | League of Ireland Premier Division | 19 | 0 | 2 | 0 | 1 | 0 | 2 | 0 | — | | 24 | 0 |
| Glentoran | 2018–19 | NIFL Premiership | 14 | 0 | — | | — | | — | | 0 (Note: Appearances in County Antrim Shield) | 0 | 14 | 0 |
| Glentoran | 2019–20 | NIFL Premiership | 19 | 1 | 1 | 0 | 0 | 0 | — | | 0 | 0 | 20 | 1 |
| Glentoran | Glentoran Total | | 33 | 1 | 1 | 0 | 0 | 0 | — | | 0 | 0 | 34 | 1 |
| Career Total | | | 358 | 22 | 40 | 5 | 19 | 1 | 9 | 1 | 25 | 0 | 441 | 29 |
