= Jason McGuinness =

Irish footballer

Personal information
- Date of birth: 8 August 1982 (age 44)
- Place of birth: Dublin, Ireland
- Position: Centre back

Youth career
- Tolka Rovers
- Sheriff Y.C.
- Bohemians

Senior career*
Years	Team	Apps	(Gls)
2002–2003	Bohemians	11	(2)
2004–2005	Shamrock Rovers	49	(6)
2006–2010	Bohemians	73	(5)
2011–2012	Sligo Rovers	57	(3)
2013–2014	Shamrock Rovers	45	(3)
2015–2016	St Patrick's Athletic	13	(0)
2016–2017	Cliftonville	14	(3)

International career
2002	Republic of Ireland U21	1	(0)
- * Club domestic league appearances and goals

Jason McGuinness (born 8 August 1982) is an Irish footballer.

== Career ==
McGuinness played at youth level for Tolka Rovers, Sheriff Y.C. and Bohemians before graduating to the Bohs first team, making his league debut as a substitute against UCD in August 2002. He made his Irish Under 21 debut four days later in an international against Finland.

With the likes of Colin Hawkins and Ken Oman in his way of regular first team football, he joined rivals Shamrock Rovers and spent 2 seasons scoring 7 goals in 57 total appearances there where he established himself at the heart of their defence before re-joining Bohs in time for the 2006 season.

McGuinness formed a great partnership with Liam Burns which played a big part in Bohs' great defensive record as they marched to 2008 Premier Division title, winning it by a record-breaking 19 points from St Patricks Athletic. Whilst participating in 2008's UEFA Intertoto Cup, he scored in both rounds, against Rhyl and FK Riga.

Jason started the season well but was fined two weeks' wages and suspended for five games in May 2009 after racially abusing Benin captain Romuald Boco during a game between Sligo Rovers and Bohemians on 5 May 2009. On his return, he struggled to find form and lost his place to Ken Oman. He also missed Bohs' EA Sports Cup final win over Waterford United in the September but did pick up his second league winners medal in a row as Bohs finished top of the table ahead of their rivals Shamrock Rovers.

Despite putting in a superb performance in the Setanta Sports Cup Final, Jason and Bohemians had a disappointing 2010 season where the club lost their league title on goal difference and failed to make an impact in Europe where they made an embarrassing exit to Welsh side The New Saints.

When McGuinness' contract expired at the end of the 2010 season, Bohemians were unable to offer new contracts due to financial troubles and Jason was released from the club. On 25 January McGuinness signed a one-year contract with Sligo Rovers.

He scored against FC Spartak Trnava in the 2012–13 UEFA Europa League

McGuinness signed once again for The Hoops in November 2012.

McGuiness signed for another of the big 4 Dublin clubs, St Patrick's Athletic, on 11 November 2014 before being released in June 2016.

=== Cliftonville ===
The day after his release, it was announced McGuinness had joined the NIFL Premiership with Cliftonville where he scored against AEK Larnaca FC in the 2016–17 UEFA Europa League

== Honours ==
- League of Ireland: 3
  - Bohemians – 2008, 2009
  - Sligo Rovers – 2012
- FAI Cup: 1
  - Sligo Rovers – 2011
- League of Ireland Cup: 2
  - Bohemians – 2009
  - St Patrick's Athletic – 2015
- Setanta Sports Cup: 2
  - Bohemians – 2009–10
  - Shamrock Rovers – 2013
- Leinster Senior Cup: 1
  - Shamrock Rovers – 2013
