= 2012 League of Ireland Cup final =

- Event: 2012 League of Ireland Cup
Drogheda United	Shamrock Rovers
3	1
- Date: 22 September
- Venue: Tallaght Stadium, Dublin
- Referee: Tom Connolly
- Attendance: 3,120
- Weather: Dry

The 2012 League of Ireland Cup final also known as the 2012 EA Sports Cup Final was the final match of the 2012 League of Ireland Cup, the 39th season of the League of Ireland Cup, a football competition for the 27 teams from the Premier Division, First Division, A Championship and the Ulster Senior League.

The final was played on Saturday, 22 September 2012 in Tallaght Stadium, Dublin. The match was televised live by Setanta Sports. If the scores were level after 90 minutes of play, then extra-time of 30 minutes duration would have been played, followed by a penalty shoot-out, if required to determine the winners of the cup.

The match was won 3-1 by Drogheda.

== Match ==
=== Details ===
22 September 2012
17.45

Drogheda United	3–1	Shamrock Rovers
D.O'Brien 33'; K.Gilbert 43' (o.g.); E.Foley 61'	Report

Tallaght Stadium, Dublin
Attendance: 3,120
Referee: Tom Connolly

Drogheda United	Shamrock Rovers

GK	1	(Italy) Gabriel Sava
RB	17	(Republic of Ireland) Brian Gannon
CB	5	(Republic of Ireland) Alan McNally	(yellow card) 73'
CB	4	(Republic of Ireland) Derek Prendergast	(yellow card) 83'
LB	3	(Republic of Ireland) Philip Hand
RM	8	(Republic of Ireland) Ryan Brennan
CM	22	(Republic of Ireland) Eric Foley	61'
CM	?	(Republic of Ireland) Paul Crowley (c)
LM	11	(Republic of Ireland) Gavin Brennan
ST	15	(Republic of Ireland) Peter Hynes	(yellow card) 21'	(substituted off) 89'
ST	19	(Republic of Ireland) Declan O'Brien	33'	(substituted off) 90+2'
Substitutes:
RB	2	(Republic of Ireland) Stephen Quigley
CM	7	(Republic of Ireland) Cathal Brady
ST	9	(Republic of Ireland) Tiernan Mulvenna	(substituted in) 89'
CM	10	(Republic of Ireland) Sean Brennan	(substituted in) 90+2'
CB	28	(Republic of Ireland) Alan Byrne
GK	40	(Republic of Ireland) Shane Finnegan
RB	42	(Republic of Ireland) Conor O’Keeffe
Manager:
(Republic of Ireland) Mick Cooke

GK	1	(Sweden) Oscar Jansson
RB	2	(England) Kerrea Gilbert	(o.g.)
CB	23	(Republic of Ireland) Colin Hawkins
CB	4	(Scotland) Craig Sives
LB	3	(Republic of Ireland) Conor Powell	Sent off (straight red)
RM	21	(Republic of Ireland) Ronan Finn
CM	15	(Republic of Ireland) Killian Brennan	59'
CM	6	(Republic of Ireland) Stephen Rice (c)	(substituted off) 45+4'
LM	7	(Republic of Ireland) Gary McCabe	(substituted off) 60'
ST	11	(Republic of Ireland) Ciarán Kilduff	(yellow card) 23'	(substituted off) 65'
ST	24	(Northern Ireland) Thomas Stewart	(substituted off) 60'
Substitutes:
CM	8	(Republic of Ireland) Stephen O'Donnell
ST	9	(Scotland) Gary Twigg	(substituted in) 65'
ST	10	(Republic of Ireland) Gary O’Neill
ST	14	(Republic of Ireland) Aaron Greene
ST	16	(Republic of Ireland) Daryl Kavanagh	(substituted in) 60'
LM	20	(Republic of Ireland) Billy Dennehy	(substituted in) 60'
GK	30	(South Africa) Reyaad Pieterse
Manager:
(Republic of Ireland) Trevor Croly
