= Keith Quinn (footballer) =

Irish footballer

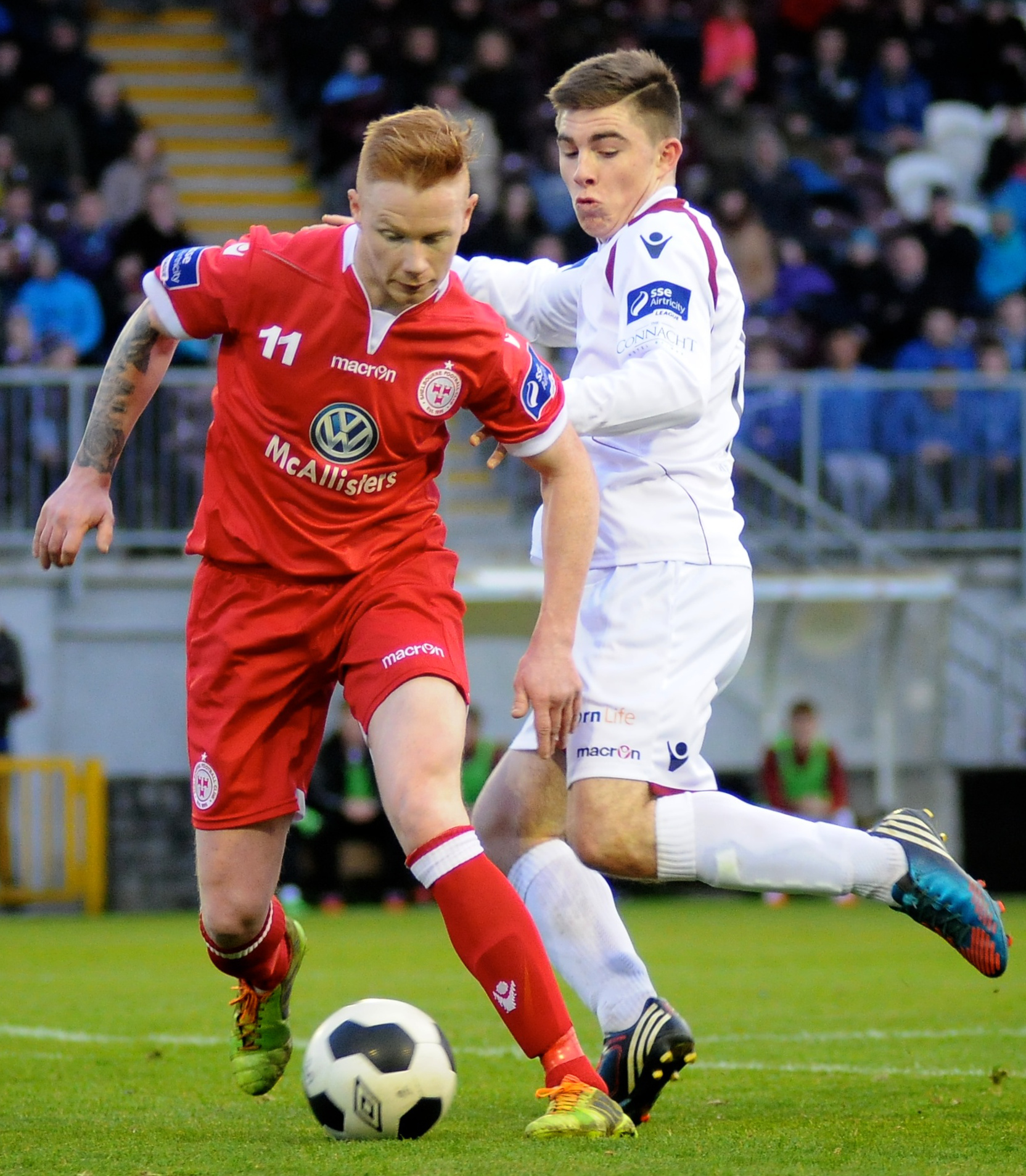
- Keith Quinn (left) playing for Shelbourne against Ryan Manning for Galway United in 2014

Personal information
- Date of birth: 22 September 1988 (age 38)
- Place of birth: Dublin, Ireland
- Position: Winger

Youth career
- 2005–2007: Sheffield United

Senior career*
Years	Team	Apps	(Gls)
2007–2009	Sheffield United	0	(0)
2009	→ Central Coast Mariners (loan)	0	(0)
2009	Bluebell United	?	(?)
2010	Sporting Fingal	20	(0)
2011	Waterford United	8	(0)
2011–2012	Monaghan United (Note: Quinn made a further eight league appearances (no goals) for Monaghan United during the 2012 League of Ireland Premier Division; however these matches were expunged when the club withdrew from the league before the end of the season)	11	(1)
2012	Cork City	4	(0)
2013	Longford Town	19	(0)
2014	Shelbourne	15	(1)
- * Club domestic league appearances and goals

Keith Quinn (born 22 September 1988) is a footballer who played for several League of Ireland clubs, including Shelbourne and Longford Town. A midfielder, he is the younger brother of Alan and Stephen Quinn. He was jailed in 2021 for drug trafficking.

== Playing career ==
Along with his brother Stephen, Keith Quinn followed his eldest brother Alan to England when he transferred to Sheffield United. Having captained the youth team at Sheffield United, he progressed to the reserve team. In March 2009, Quinn was loaned to Central Coast Mariners in Australia's A League. However, the A League was not in season during Quinn's loan, and Quinn could not play in the Asian Champions League as he registered too late. After failing to make a first team appearance for Sheffield United, he was released at the end of the 2008–09 season.

Quinn returned to Ireland to continue his career with Leinster Senior League side Bluebell United, before signing professionally with League of Ireland club Sporting Fingal in January 2010.

He signed for First Division side Waterford United in December 2010, to play for the 2011 season.

He joined Monaghan United in the summer transfer window and made 13 appearances in all competitions, scoring 1 goal. In December he agreed to stay on at the club in 2012. On 18 June 2012, the club announced their withdrawal from the League of Ireland and all of their playing staff were released by the club.

In August 2012, Quinn signed for Cork City. After just four league appearances for Cork, he signed for Longford Town in January 2013. He was released by Longford after one season. His last League of Ireland club was Shelbourne, which he joined in February 2014. He later returned to Bluebell United in the Leinster Senior League.

== Outside football ==
In August 2020, Quinn was arrested along with Bluebell United manager Andrew Noonan during an investigation into trafficking of heroin. Quinn was convicted of trafficking in April 2021 and sentenced to seven and half years imprisonment, with three years suspended. In December 2021, upon appeal from the state, Quinn's sentence was increased to eight years in jail with the last 18 months suspended.
