= Alan Keane (association footballer) =

Irish footballer

Personal information
- Date of birth: 23 September 1984 (age 42)
- Place of birth: Galway, Ireland
- Height: 1.78 m (5 ft 10 in)
- Position: Right back

Youth career
- St Bernard's
- Mervue United

Senior career*
Years	Team	Apps	(Gls)
2005–2008	Galway United	68	(2)
2009–2015	Sligo Rovers	239	(20)
2016–2017	Dundalk	5	(0)
2017	Crusaders	10	(0)
Total		322	(22)
- * Club domestic league appearances and goals as of 16:04, 5 May 2017

Alan Keane (born 23 September 1984) is a retired Irish footballer.

Keane is a versatile player who can play anywhere across the back four, though his preferred position is right back. He has also been known to play on the wing.

== Career ==
=== Galway United ===
Keane made his début for Galway United towards the end of the 2005 season and was mostly used as a right back in his time with the club.

=== Sligo Rovers ===
In February 2009, Keane joined Sligo Rovers after four seasons at Galway United.

Keane missed a penalty and scored an own goal in the 2009–10 UEFA Europa League tie against Albanian side Vllaznia. In the second leg he scored at the right end. He went on to become Rovers regular penalty taker during the 2010 season scoring some important goals including one in the last minute of the season against St. Patrick's Athletic to secure third place. He did however miss in the FAI Cup final shoot-out two weeks later.

He was an important part of the league winning Rovers team in 2012 although he missed the end of the season through injury. He only missed one game in the 2013 League of Ireland season and picked up his third FAI Cup winners' medal with the club following the win over Drogheda United in the final. He made his 200th appearance for Sligo in the game against St. Pats towards the end of the season.

In February 2016, he announced his retirement from professional football.

=== Dundalk ===
On 25 August 2016, Keane came out of retirement and signed for Dundalk in the League of Ireland Premier Division citing the influence of manager Stephen Kenny as one of the reasons he was attracted to the club. He made his debut five days later in an FAI Cup third round win against Crumlin United.

=== Crusaders ===
On 7 January 2017, Keane joined Crusaders in Northern Ireland on a six-month loan spell.

== Personal life ==
Following his retirement from football, Keane worked as a firefighter.

== Honours ==
Sligo Rovers

- League of Ireland (1): 2012
- FAI Cup (3): 2010, 2011, 2013
- League of Ireland Cup (1): 2010
- Setanta Sports Cup (1): 2014

Dundalk

- League of Ireland (1): 2016

== Career statistics ==
=== Club ===
Correct as of 7 November 2011.

Season	Club	League	League		FAI Cup		League Cup		Europe		Setanta Cup		Total	
Season	Club	League	Apps	Goals	Apps	Goals	Apps	Goals	Apps	Goals	Apps	Goals	Apps	Goals
2009	Sligo Rovers	League of Ireland	34	4	6	0	3	2	2	1	2	0	47	7
2010	Sligo Rovers	League of Ireland	34	5	4	2	4	0	0	0	2	0	44	7
2011	Sligo Rovers	League of Ireland	31	2	4	0	2	0	1	0	3	0	41	2
2012	Sligo Rovers	League of Ireland	17	1	1	0	2	0	0	0	4	0	24	1
2013	Sligo Rovers	League of Ireland	32	0	5	1	3	0	2	0	4	0	46	1
Total	Sligo Rovers	League of Ireland	148	12	20	3	14	2	5	1	15	0	202	18
