= Romuald Boco =

Beninese footballer (born 1985)

Personal information
- Full name: Romuald Boco
- Date of birth: 8 July 1985 (age 41)
- Place of birth: Bernay, France
- Height: 5 ft 10 in (1.78 m)
- Position: Midfielder

Senior career*
Years	Team	Apps	(Gls)
2003–2004	Chamois Niortais B	0	(0)
2004–2005	Chamois Niortais	2	(0)
2005–2008	Accrington Stanley	73	(7)
2008–2010	Sligo Rovers	57	(8)
2010	Burton Albion	8	(0)
2010–2011	Sligo Rovers	10	(4)
2011	Shanghai East Asia	22	(1)
2011–2012	Sligo Rovers	22	(2)
2012–2013	Accrington Stanley	42	(10)
2013–2014	Plymouth Argyle	27	(1)
2014–2015	Chesterfield	13	(1)
2015	Bharat FC	20	(0)
2015–2016	Portsmouth	4	(0)
2015	→ Havant & Waterlooville (loan)	3	(0)
2016–2017	Accrington Stanley	41	(8)
2017–2018	Leyton Orient	17	(2)
Total		351	(44)

International career
2004–2013	Benin	52	(1)
- * Club domestic league appearances and goals

Romuald Boco (born 8 July 1985) is a former professional footballer who played as a midfielder. Born in France, he has represented Benin at full international level.

== Club career ==
=== Accrington Stanley ===
Born in Bernay, Eure, Boco signed for English side Accrington Stanley just before the 2005 transfer deadline from French side Niort. He helped the club achieve promotion from the fifth tier to the fourth tier. He had the honour of scoring the first two Football League goals for Stanley, in a 2–1 win against Barnet. He instantly became a favourite among the fans who stated they were "loco for Boco.".

After returning from the 2008 African Cup of Nations, he requested his contract be terminated, due to Homesickness.

On 30 January 2016, Accrington Stanley announced that Boco had rejoined the club until Season End. He will take retake his 26 shirt as worn in his original stint with the club.

=== Sligo Rovers ===
On 11 February 2008, he signed for Sligo Rovers of the League of Ireland Premier Division.

His new manager Paul Cook, who he previously played with at Accrington Stanley, was happy with his latest signing ahead of his team's new campaign, "I didn't think I'd get him, I thought that he would be out of our reach but, thankfully we have secured him," said Cook.

"I don't want to put pressure on him, but I'm certain that the fans will see that he is the real deal and with the other signings we've made, I believe that we're in for a very exciting season."

He scored his first league goal for Sligo Rovers in a 3–1 win over Cobh Ramblers. He helped Rovers to qualification for the UEFA Europa League, formerly known as the UEFA Cup.

On 7 June 2009, he expressed concern at the financial situation within the League of Ireland in an interview with the BBC. Boco left Sligo when his contract expired at the end of the 2009 season.

Boco was on trial with Doncaster Rovers in a bid to earn a contract with the championship club, however nothing materialised and he then went on trial with Football League Two side Burton Albion after his contract with Sligo Rovers ran out and he decided not to sign a new one.

=== Burton Albion ===
Boco joined Burton Albion on a deal until the end of the season on 24 February 2010.

=== Sligo Rovers return ===
Boco rejoined Sligo Rovers on 30 July 2010 signing a contract which will expire by the end of the 2010 season. He played a major part in helping Rovers win the 2010 FAI Ford Cup after being changed position a right or left winger. When he first signed for Sligo Rovers he was a striker that was sometimes used as a centre midfielder and then changed to right-back. on 23 November, Paul Cook admitted that it's doubtful Boco will signed a new contract after turning down the club's "final" offer.

Despite talks of the club and Boco agreeing terms, on 23 February 2011 Paul Cook announced that Boco would not be returning to the Showgrounds for the coming season.

Boco then went on to join Shanghai East Asia on a deal until the end of the season. After a promising first season in China, Boco rejoined Sligo Rovers on 19 December 2011 after talks with Paul Cook.

The move would be his third spell for the Sligo.

After consistently impressing during Sligo's pre-season fixtures, Boco scored his first goal back in the red of Sligo during the team's 2–0 win over Glentoran in the Setanta Cup Quarter Final first leg.

On 31 August 2012, it was announced Boco had re-joined former club Accrington Stanley on a one-year deal.

=== Accrington Stanley ===
He made a good start to his second stint at the Crown Ground, scoring vital goals in order to keep Stanley's League status. He has built a reputation for his tireless work rate and running. He has the perfect start to his second stint at Accrington scoring his first goal away to Cheltenham Town in September. Two more goals followed away to Chesterfield, Rochdale, Barnet, Fleetwood Town, Bradford City, Chesterfield again and Rochdale again. He is currently the top scorer for Accrington during this season.

He received a Player of the Year nomination following a period of hard work rate and increased fan support.

=== Plymouth Argyle ===
Boco signed a one-year contract with Plymouth Argyle in July 2013, and made his debut in the club's first game of the new season at Southend United.

=== Chesterfield ===
Romuald signed for Chesterfield on 8 August 2014 on a non-contract basis. This once again reunited him with manager Paul Cook who he previously played under at Sligo and Accrington. Boco scored on his debut against Leyton Orient in a 2–1 victory for the Spireites.

=== Bharat FC ===
On 20 January 2015, Boco signed for Indian I-League newcomers Kalyani Bharat FC, as the club's marquee player. He debuted for the Pune based side against Dempo SC. He has appeared in all 20 league matches in the 2014–15 I-League season, under the coaching of Stuart Watkiss.

== International career ==
Boco was part of the Beninese 2004 African Nations Cup team, who finished bottom of their group in the first round of the competition.

Boco and Benin finished third in 2005 African Youth Championship. He also scored a goal against Ivory Coast in the tournament. He has also represented Benin U20 team at the 2005 FIFA World Youth Championship under the coaching of Serge Devèze and appeared in all three group matches. Benin finished third in the Group A and bowed out of the tournament.

Boco captained Benin in the 2008 African Nations Cup in what was only the country's second time qualifying for the competition, and was part of the Beninese 2010 African Nations Cup team.

He scored his first and only goal for the national team on 11 February 2009 against Algeria in a friendly match, that ended as their 2–1 defeat. Between 2004 and 2013, Boco earned 52 caps for Benin internationally, scoring a goal.

== Personal life ==
Boco was born on 8 July 1985 in Bernay, France. He was born to a Beninese father and a French mother. He has a son.

== Career statistics ==
=== Club ===
Appearances and goals by club, season and competition
Club	Season	League			National cup		League cup		Continental		Other		Total	
Club	Season	Division	Apps	Goals	Apps	Goals	Apps	Goals	Apps	Goals	Apps	Goals	Apps	Goals
Chamois Niortais	2004–05	Ligue 2	2	0					—		—		2	0
Accrington Stanley	2005–06	Conference Premier	30	4			—		—		1 (Note: Appearance in Football League Trophy) (Note: Source omits FA Trophy appearances)	0	31	4
Accrington Stanley	2006–07	League Two	32	3	0	0	2	0	—		1	0	35	3
Accrington Stanley	2007–08	League Two	11	0	0	0	1	0	—		1	0	13	0
Accrington Stanley	Total		73	7	0	0	3	0	—		3	0	79	7
Sligo Rovers	2008	League of Ireland	28	6					—				28	6
Sligo Rovers	2009	League of Ireland	29	2					2 (Note: Appearances in UEFA Europa League)	0			31	2
Sligo Rovers	Total		57	8	3	1	0	0	2	0			62	9
Burton Albion (loan)	2009–10	League Two	8	0	—		—		—		—		8	0
Sligo Rovers	2010	League of Ireland	10	4	3	1			—				13	5
Shanghai East Asia	2011	Chinese League One	22	1									22	1
Sligo Rovers	2012	League of Ireland	22	2	0	0	3	0	2	0			27	2
Accrington Stanley	2012–13	League Two	42	10	3	0	0	0	—		0	0	45	10
Plymouth Argyle	2013–14	League Two	27	1	4	0	2	0	—		1	0	34	1
Chesterfield	2014–15	League One	13	1	5	0	1	0	—		0	0	19	1
Bharat FC	2015	I-League	20	0	0	0	—		—		—		20	0
Portsmouth	2015–16	League Two	4	0	1	0	—		—		—		5	0
Havant and Waterlooville (loan)	2015–16	National League South	3	0	0	0	—		—		1	0	4	0
Accrington Stanley	2015–16	League Two	11	2	0	0	—		—		1 (Note: Appearance in League Two play-offs)	0	12	2
Accrington Stanley	2016–17	League Two	30	6	4	1	2	0	—		2	0	38	7
Accrington Stanley	Total		41	8	4	1	2	0	0	0	3	0	50	9
Leyton Orient	2017–18	National League	17	2	1	0	—		—		–		18	2
Career total			361	44	24	3	11	0	4	0	8	0	408	47

=== International ===
Score and result list Benin's goal tally first, score column indicates score after Boco goal.

International goal scored by Romuald Boco
No.	Date	Venue	Opponent	Score	Result	Competition
1	11 February 2009	Mustapha Tchaker Stadium, Blida, Algeria	Algeria	1–2	1–2	Friendly

== Honours ==
Benin U20

- African Youth Championship third place: 2005

Accrington Stanley

- Conference Premier: 2005–06

Sligo Rovers

- FAI Cup: 2010
- League of Ireland Cup: 2010
