= Paul Crowley (footballer) =

Irish footballer

Personal information
- Full name: Paul Crowley
- Date of birth: 13 August 1980 (age 46)
- Place of birth: Dublin, Ireland
- Position: Midfielder

Youth career
- 1991–1997: Rangers A.F.C.

Senior career*
Years	Team	Apps	(Gls)
1997–2000	Shamrock Rovers	14	(3)
2000–2005	Dublin City	108	(9)
2005	Waterford United	24	(5)
2006	Dublin City	0	(0)
2006–2007	UCD	27	(0)
2007–2008	Dundalk	33	(10)
2009–2010	Drogheda United	20	(1)
2011	St Patrick's Athletic	24	(2)
2012	Drogheda United	27	(3)
2013	Shelbourne	9	(0)
2014	Drogheda United	18	(0)
- * Club domestic league appearances and goals

Paul Crowley (born 13 August 1980) is an Irish footballer who last played with League of Ireland side Drogheda United. Crowley plays as a defensive midfielder.

== Career ==
=== Shamrock Rovers ===
Crowley started his career in 1997, for Mick Byrne's Shamrock Rovers. Crowley found his chances extremely limited was confined to the fringes of the team.

=== Dublin City ===
Crowley joined First Division side, Dublin City in 2000, in the hope of finding more football. He ended up staying with the Vikings for five years and establishing himself as a quality player. In 2003, he won his first ever silverware, as Dublin won the First Division. After a brief spell at Waterford United, Crowley returned to Dublin in 2006. In his first season back, Dublin City did not renew their licence and subsequently folded.

=== Dundalk ===
After the liquidation of Dublin City, Crowley spent a season at UCD, before moving to Dundalk in 2007, who were managed by his old mentor from Dublin City, John Gill. He was part of the Dundalk squad which won the 2008 League of Ireland First Division.

=== Drogheda United ===
Crowley signed for Alan Mathews' Drogheda United in 2009. He stayed at the Boyneside for two seasons and became a fixture in central midfield. He re-signed for the club for the 2010 season, which turned out to be a disaster, with the Drogs finishing rock-bottom of the league with only four wins. Due to financial worries, Crowley's contract was not renewed for the 2011 season, so he was forced to seek a new club elsewhere.

=== St Patrick's Athletic ===
Crowley signed for St Patrick's Athletic F.C. on 21 January 2011. He played for the club during their European adventure, as they beat ÍBV from Iceland and Shakhter Karagandy from Kazakhstan, before losing to Karpaty Lviv of Ukraine, 5–1 on aggregate in the Third Qualifying Round.

=== Return to Drogheda ===
Crowley re-signed for Drogheda United ahead of the 2012 season. He was immediately made captain by manager, Mick Cooke and handed the number 16 shirt. After picking up an injury in a friendly, Crowley had to wait until the third game of the league before making his second Drogheda debut, getting sent off in a 0–0 draw with Dundalk.

Despite this early setback, Crowley ended up playing a huge role as Drogheda enjoyed a hugely successful season finishing 2nd in the league. He also started in centre-midfield in the EA Sports Cup Final as Drogheda beat Shamrock Rovers 3–1 in Tallaght – the first major trophy of Crowley's career.

Despite a good season, Crowley was released by Drogheda on 27 November 2012 – a decision which shocked many of Drogheda's supporters.
