= Vinny Sullivan =

Irish footballer

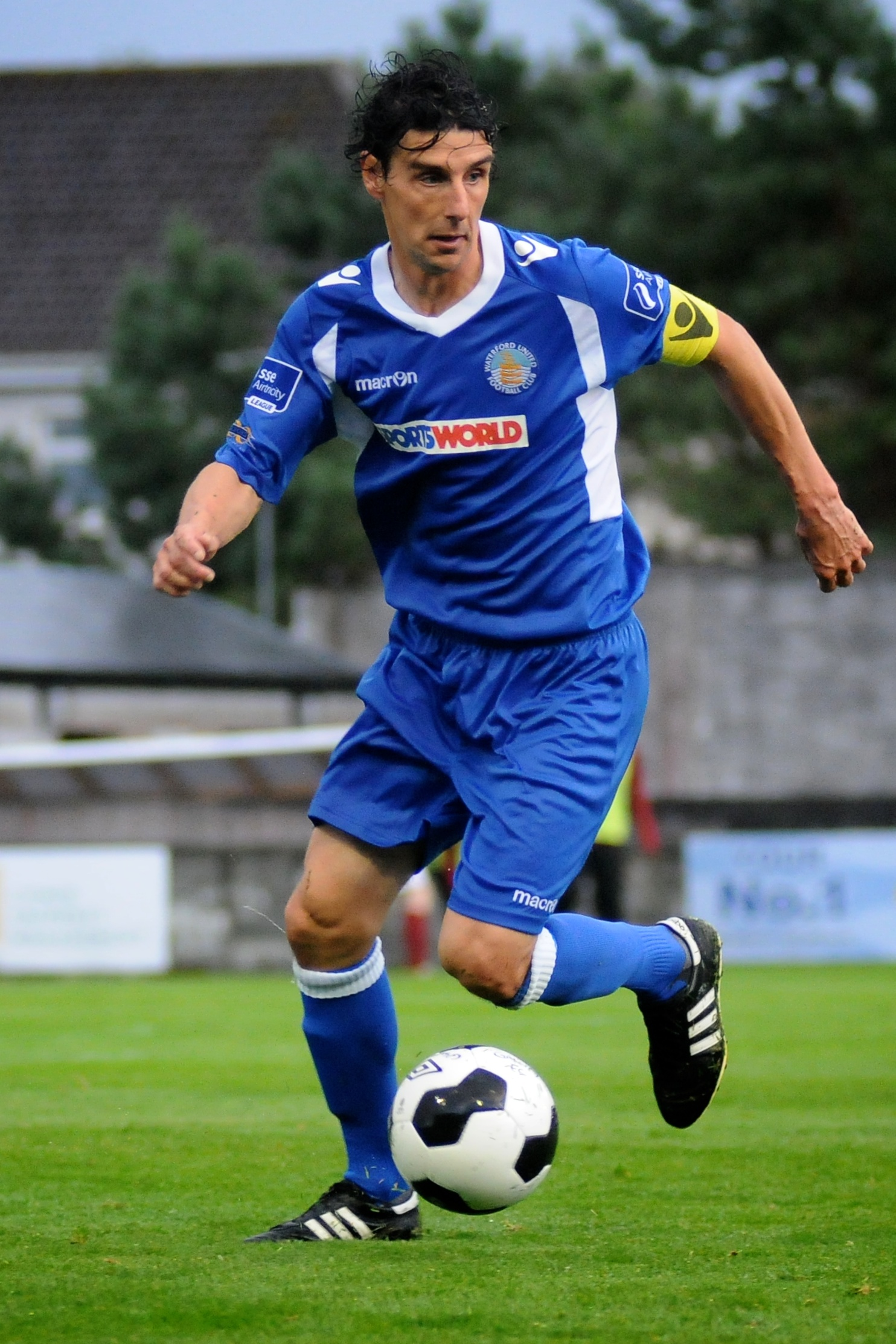
- Vinny Sullivan in action against Galway FC at Eamon Deacy Park in 2014

Personal information
- Date of birth: 19 April 1981 (age 45)
- Place of birth: Waterford, Ireland
- Position: Forward

Youth career
- Dungarvan United

Senior career*
| Years | Team | Apps | (Gls) |
| 1999–2001 | Celtic | | |
| 2001–2002 | Livingston | | |
- → Cowdenbeath (loan)
| 2002–2005 | Waterford United | | |
| 2006 | Cork City | | |
| 2007–2010 | Waterford United | | |
| 2011–2012 | Cork City | 64 | (18) |
| 2013–2014 | Waterford United | 26 | (7) |
- * Club domestic league appearances and goals

Vinny Sullivan (born 19 April 1981) is an Irish footballer who last played for Waterford United in the League of Ireland. Vinny plays as a forward.

== Playing career ==
=== Early career ===
Vinny left Dungarvan United for Celtic at the age of 17. He transferred to Livingston in 2002 in a season where they finished third in the SPL, and spent a brief period on loan at Cowdenbeath.

=== Waterford United ===
Vinny signed for Waterford United in 2002 and made an immediate impact as he helped the Blues to the League of Ireland First Division title, contributing thirteen goals in the process. He was a virtual ever-present for Waterford. He finished as runners up in the FAI Cup in 2004.

=== Cork City ===
Sullivan spent the 2006 season with Cork City Cork were defending the title they won in 2005 when Sullivan was scoring for Waterford United but Vinny did not play much. He left the club in December after coach Damien Richardson agreed to cancel his contract.

=== Waterford United ===
Vinny found himself back in the Premier Division with Waterford United for the 2007 season after Shelbourne were relegated. He left the club for a brief period in 2009 to concentrate on Gaelic football with Dungarvan, but on 26 August 2009, he signed again with Waterford United.

=== Cork City ===
Vinny returned to Cork City in 2011. He scored a 35-yard curler on his return against Waterford in the quarter final of the Munster Senior Cup on 13 February. On 4 March, he scored the winner on his home debut, in a 1-0 league win over Wexford Youths.
