= Declan O'Brien (footballer) =

Irish footballer

Personal information
- Date of birth: 16 June 1979 (age 47)
- Place of birth: Dublin, Ireland
- Position: Forward

Youth career
- Corduff United
- Rivermount
- Verona

Senior career*
Years	Team	Apps	(Gls)
2001–2008	Drogheda United	188	(76)
2009	Dundalk	16	(4)
2009	→ St Patrick's Athletic (loan)	12	(2)
2009–2010	Valletta	12	(9)
2010	Athlone Town	9	(4)
2011	Monaghan United	26	(13)
2012–2014	Drogheda United	101	(42)
2015–2017	Glenavon	32	(9)
2017	Carrick Rangers	10	(3)
2017–2018	Verona	19	(4)
Total		425	(166)

Managerial career
- 2017–2018: Verona
- * Club domestic league appearances and goals

Declan "Fabio" O'Brien (born 16 June 1979) is an Irish former professional footballer who played as a striker. He is Drogheda United's top goalscorer of all time.

== Playing career ==
=== Early life and career ===
Blanchardstown, County Dublin native O'Brien began playing a football with local clubs Corduff United, Rivermount and Verona FC. During his youth he gained the nickname Fabio during schoolboy football days, a nod to some Italian family on his mother's side and, his tanned skin at that age. The nickname stuck throughout his career after Drogheda teammates heard the nickname and jokingly assumed he was signing from Italian club Hellas Verona.

=== Drogheda United ===
O'Brien started his professional career with Drogheda United scoring on his League of Ireland debut at Cobh Ramblers on the opening day of the 2001–02 League of Ireland. He was the club captain and talisman and he captained the club to one FAI Cup in 2005 , a game where he scored, two Setanta Cups and the club's only ever title win in 2007. Fabio is the club's all-time leading goalscorer with 90 goals in 184 games, 76 in domestic league and the rest in domestic cups (Setanta Sports Cup, FAI Cup and League of Ireland Cup) from his first spell at Hunky Dorys Park.

=== Dundalk ===
On 15 January 2009, O'Brien made the controversial move across Louth to Drogheda United's local rivals Dundalk who had just been promoted to the League of Ireland Premier Division. He played out of position as a left winger and left in the transfer window in July. He managed 4 goals in 15 appearances.

=== St Patrick's Athletic ===
He signed for St Patrick's Athletic in July for the rest of the 2009 season on loan . He scored on his debut in the Europa League against Valletta and repeated the trick in the second leg to send St Patrick's Athletic into the next round. O'Brien then scored in both rounds again against FC Krylia Sovetov Samara to become St Patrick's Athletic all-time record scorer in European competition at the time and also earned himself the record for goals in consecutive European games for an Irish player. He was League of Ireland Player of the Month for July 2009. He finished the season as joint top scorer with St Patricks despite being there for just four months.

=== Valletta ===
In December 2009, O'Brien joined Maltese football club Valletta, the same club that he helped eliminate in the Europa League qualifiers, on a free transfer, after his loan contract with St Patrick's Athletic expired the previous month.

In his debut with Valletta (in a Triangular tournament against Parma and Hibernians), Declan managed to score with a low flying header against Serie A side Parma. On 15 February 2010, making his 6th league appearance for Valletta, O'Brien scored his first league goals in a 6–0 victory over Dingli Swallows by scoring 4 goals.

Then on 27 February 2010, on his 7th league appearance Declan managed to scored twice in 15 mins after being substituted on in the 75th minute against Tarxien Rainbows with the score finishing 6–2 for Valletta. He followed this up with another brace in the Gozo Cup against Gozo a week later. He also scored 2 weeks later in a 3–1 victory over Birkirkara in the Maltese FA Trophy.

He won his first piece of silverware with Valletta, by winning the 100th League Anniversary Cup against bitter rivals Floriana FC on 13 April 2010. He went on to win the Maltese FA Trophy that season also but lost out on the treble finishing second in the league. He left the club by mutual consent that summer.

=== Athlone Town ===
In July 2010 he signed for Athlone Town as a player-coach and made his debut in a 1–1 draw against Middlesbrough in a friendly. He scored his first goal for Athlone away to Derry City at the Brandywell Stadium on 10 September 2010.

=== Monaghan United ===
He signed for Monaghan United in December 2010 on a two-year deal. He scored two on his debut against Cork City in 2–2 draw at Turners Cross on 1 April. He then scored the winning goal on his home debut v Longford Town in a 1–0 win the following week.

O'Brien hit his first hat trick for Monaghan in the third round of the FAI Cup v Everton A.F.C.

In his last game for Monaghan he helped secure promotion by scoring a brace against Galway United in November 2011.

=== Return to Drogheda ===
For the 2012 season O'Brien returned to Drogheda United. He scored his first goal on his return at Bray.

O'Brien scored his 100th League of Ireland goal at Tallaght Stadium in May 2012.

He scored the opener in the 2012 League of Ireland Cup Final against Shamrock Rovers at Tallaght Stadium. The Drogs won 3–1 which completed Fabio's set of medals in the domestic game having won the League title, FAI Cup and the Setanta Sports Cup (twice) in his previous stint at the club. To add gloss to the victory, he was also awarded 'Man of the Match'.

Fabio was in the MNS Team of the Year 2012, along with Drogheda teammate Gabriel Sava. He scored 18 goals in all competitions for Drogheda to become the first Drogheda player to score more than 100 goals for the club. On 22 November 2012, Fabio signed a one-year deal with the Drogs to keep him at United Park until the end of the 2013 season.

As of August 2022, O'Brien is 22nd in the all-time League of Ireland goalscoring list with 128 league goals.

=== Glenavon ===
On the opening of the January 2015 transfer window, O'Brien joined NIFL Premiership side and current Irish Cup holders Glenavon on an 18-month deal. O'Brien scored a debut hattrick in a 4–2 win over Ballymena United.

=== Carrick Rangers ===
The Irish attacker signed a 2-year deal with the 'Amber Army' in late January 2017 from Glenavon. Fabio scored on his Carrick Rangers debut against Ards in a 4–0 win away from home, the club's biggest margin of victory for 3 years. He has already picked up 3 assists in his time at Taylor's Avenue. The former Valletta player scored a brace in the 2nd leg of the promotion/relegation playoff final, to cap off a 4–1 victory over championship runners-up Institute, sealing a 5-2 aggregate win to stay in the premiership.

=== Verona ===
On 23 June 2017, it was announced that O'Brien had left Carrick to become player-manager of Leinster Senior League side Verona FC.

== Honours ==
- League of Ireland:
  - Drogheda United – 2007
- FAI Cup:
  - Drogheda United – 2005
- Setanta Cup:
  - Drogheda United – 2006, 2007
- League of Ireland Cup:
  - Drogheda United – 2012
- League of Ireland First Division:
  - Drogheda United – 2001–02
- Maltese Cup:
  - Valletta F.C. – 2010
- 100th League Anniversary Cup
  - Valletta F.C. – 2010
- Irish Cup:
  - Glenavon – 2015–16
