= 2012 Shelbourne F.C. season =

Shelbourne
2012 season
- Chairman: Joe Casey
- Manager: Alan Mathews
- Stadium: Tolka Park
- Premier Division: 8th
- FAI Cup: Semi-finals
- League of Ireland Cup: Second round
- Leinster Senior Cup: Semi-finals
- Top goalscorer: League: Philip Hughes (11); All: Philip Hughes (18)
- Highest home attendance: 2,255 vs Shamrock Rovers (14 September 2012)
- Lowest home attendance: 180 vs Mervue United (26 March 2012)
Home colours	Away colours	Third colours

In 2012 Shelbourne F.C. competed in the League of Ireland Premier Division. Shelbourne finished the season in 8th position and reached the semi-finals of the 2012 FAI Cup. The 2012 season marked the first time Shelbourne competed in the Premier Division since 2006, when as champions, they were demoted due to financial issues. Shelbourne gained promotion by finishing 2nd in the 2011 League of Ireland First Division.

== Commercial partners ==
Title	Sponsor
Main Sponsor	Mc Allister Volkswagen
Kit, Associate Sponsor	Macron
Associate Sponsor	tickets.ie
Associate Sponsor	Nivea for Men

== Staff ==
Chairman	Joe Casey
Secretary	Colm Murphy
FAI/League Delegate	Shay Weafer
Licensing & IT Officer	Liam Ward
Commercial Manager	Niall Fitzmaurice
Media Officer	Frank Young
Event Controller	Paul O'Rourke
Safety Officer	Fran Rennick
Stadium PA Announcer	Karl Philiips
Club Children's Officer	Tony Hatton
Club Chaplain	Fr. John Galvin
Club Promotions Officer	Sean Fitzpatrick

=== First team coaching and medical staff ===
Position	Name
Team Manager	Alan Mathews
Assistant Team Manager	Barry O'Connor
Goalkeeping coach	Shay Kelly
Club Physiotherapist	Karen McCann
Club Massuese	Celine Cully
Equipment Manager	Aidan "Jacko" Smyth
Assistant Equipment Manager	Johnny Watson
Club Doctor	Dr. Joe McKeever (from May 2012)
Club Doctor	Dr. Ronan O'Callaghan (until May 2012)

== First team squad 2012 ==
A total of 23 players represented Shelbourne at various stages during the 2012 season.

Note: Flags indicate national team as defined under FIFA eligibility rules; some limited exceptions apply. Players may hold more than one non-FIFA nationality.

No.	Pos.	Nation	Player
1	GK	IRL	Dean Delany
2	DF	IRL	Gareth Matthews
3	DF	IRL	Lorcan Fitzgerald
4	DF	IRL	Andy Boyle
5	DF	IRL	Stephen Paisley
6	MF	IRL	Glenn Cronin (Vice-captain)
7	MF	IRL	Conan Byrne
8	MF	IRL	David Cassidy (Captain)
9	FW	IRL	Philip Hughes
10	MF	IRL	Kevin Dawson
11	MF	IRL	Brendan McGill
12	DF	IRL	Brian Shortall

No.	Pos.	Nation	Player
13	GK	IRL	Paul Skinner
14	MF	IRL	Paddy Kavanagh
15	MF	IRL	Barry Clancy
16	MF	IRL	Stephen Hurley
17	DF	IRL	Sean Byrne
18	FW	IRL	Paul Byrne
19	FW	IRL	Philip Gorman
23	DF	IRL	Ian Ryan
24	MF	IRL	Anto Murphy
30	GK	SCO	Chris Bennion
35	MF	IRL	John Sullivan

== Post-2011 season ==
=== Transfers in ===
As of 6 July 2012.

Date	Pos.	Name	From
13 December 2011	MF	(Republic of Ireland) Glenn Cronin	Bohemians
3 January 2012	DF	(Republic of Ireland) Brian Shortall	St. Patrick's Athletic
9 February 2012	FW	(Republic of Ireland) Paul Byrne	Monaghan United
9 February 2012	MF	(Republic of Ireland) Stephen Hurley	Bohemians
9 February 2012	MF	(Republic of Ireland) Paddy Kavanagh	Shamrock Rovers
9 February 2012	MF	(Republic of Ireland) Anto Murphy	St. Patrick's Athletic
6 July 2012	GK	(Scotland) Chris Bennion	Monaghan United

=== Transfers out ===
As of 1 August 2012.

Date	Pos.	Name	To
6 November 2011	FW	(Republic of Ireland) Karl Bermingham	Longford Town
6 November 2011	FW	(Brazil) David da Silva	
6 November 2011	MF	(Republic of Ireland) Colm James	Longford Town
6 November 2011	MF	(Republic of Ireland) David McGill	
6 November 2011	MF	(Republic of Ireland) Chris Mulhall	UCD
30 July 2012	MF	(Republic of Ireland) John Sullivan	Drogheda United
31 July 2012	MF	(Republic of Ireland) Brendan McGill	

== 2012 fixtures and results ==
Win Draw Loss

=== League of Ireland Premier Division ===
2 March 2012 1	Shelbourne	1 – 1	Sligo Rovers	Tolka Park, Dublin
20.00 GMT	Philip Hughes 42'	Report	Jason McGuinness 90+3'; Mark Quigley (red card) 45'	Attendance: 1,918; Referee: Derek Tomney (Dublin)

9 March 2012 2	Bohemians	0 – 2	Shelbourne	Dalymount Park, Dublin
19.45 GMT		Report	Paddy Kavanagh 20'; Philip Hughes 70'	Attendance: 2,690; Referee: Alan Kelly (Cork)

16 March 2012 3	Shelbourne	1 – 0	Derry City	Tolka Park, Dublin
20.00 GMT	Philip Hughes 43'	Report	Rory Patterson (red card) 90+2'	Attendance: 1,251; Referee: Pádraig Sutton (Clare)

23 March 2012 4	Shamrock Rovers	4 – 0	Shelbourne	Tallaght Stadium, Dublin
20.00 GMT	Gary Twigg 7' (pen.); Stephen Hurley 31' (o.g.); Ronan Finn 44'; Aaron Greene 73'; Gary McCabe (red card) 82'	Report	Dean Delany (red card) 4'	Referee: Derek Tomney (Dublin)

30 March 2012 5	Shelbourne	1 – 1	St. Patrick's Athletic	Tolka Park, Dublin
20.00 IST	Brendan Clarke 22' (o.g.); Glenn Cronin (red card) 66'	Report	Chris Fagan 43'	Attendance: 1,882; Referee: Alan Kelly (Cork)

6 April 2012 6	Dundalk	0 – 0	Shelbourne	Oriel Park, Dundalk
19.45 IST		Report		Attendance: 1,362; Referee: Rob Rogers (Dublin)

13 April 2012 7	Shelbourne	2 – 1	Bray Wanderers	Tolka Park, Dublin
20.00 IST	Philip Hughes 10'; Philip Gorman 82'	Report	Jason Byrne 30'; Jason Byrne (penalty missed) 60' (pen.)	Attendance: 1,008; Referee: Anthony Buttimer (Cork)

20 April 2012 8	Drogheda United	3 – 1	Shelbourne	Hunky Dorys Park, Drogheda
19.45 IST	Brian Gannon 44'; Ryan Brennan 53'; Peter Hynes 74'	Report	Philip Hughes 81' (pen.); Stephen Paisley (red card) 87'	Attendance: 1,048; Referee: Tom Connolly (Dublin)

27 April 2012 9	Shelbourne	1 – 2	Cork City	Tolka Park, Dublin
20.00 IST	Paddy Kavanagh 47'	Report	Vinny Sullivan 20' 83'	Attendance: 1,033; Referee: Derek Tomney (Dublin)

11 May 2012 10	UCD	0 – 2	Shelbourne	UCD Bowl, Dublin
19.45 IST		Report	Philip Gorman 1'; David Cassidy 65'; Sean Byrne (red card) 13'	Attendance: 602; Referee: Alan Kelly (Cork)

18 May 2012 11	Sligo Rovers	3 – 0	Shelbourne	The Showgrounds, Sligo
19.45 IST	Danny North 43' 47'; Pascal Millien 84'	Report		Attendance: 2,477; Referee: Paul Tuite (Dublin)

21 May 2012 12	Shelbourne	1 – 2	Bohemians	Tolka Park, Dublin
20.00 IST	Glenn Cronin 44' (pen.); John Sullivan (red card) 34'	Report	Peter McMahon 53'; Ryan McEvoy 90'	Attendance: 1,489; Referee: Dave McKeon (Meath)

1 June 2012 13	Derry City	0 – 1	Shelbourne	Brandywell Stadium, Derry
19.45 IST		Report	Philip Hughes 71'	Referee: Derek Tomney (Dublin)

21 June 2012 14	Shelbourne	2 – 3	Shamrock Rovers	Tolka Park, Dublin
20.00 IST	Paul Byrne 7'; Philip Hughes 64'; Anto Murphy (red card) 18'	Report	Gary Twigg 13' 80'; Gary McCabe 68'	Attendance: 1,889; Referee: Tom Connolly (Dublin)

29 June 2012 15	St. Patrick's Athletic	1 – 0	Shelbourne	Richmond Park, Dublin
19.45 IST	Greg Bolger 9'	Report	Barry Clancy (red card) 84'	Attendance: 1,579; Referee: Anthony Buttimer (Cork)

6 July 2012 16	Shelbourne	4 – 0	Dundalk	Tolka Park, Dublin
20.00 IST	Philip Gorman 30' 52'; Kevin Dawson 64'; Ben McLaughlin 71' (o.g.)	Report		Attendance: 801; Referee: Alan Kelly (Cork)

13 July 2012 17	Bray Wanderers	2 – 3	Shelbourne	Carlisle Grounds, Bray
19.45 IST	Kieran 'Marty' Waters 36'; John Mulroy 48'; Kieran 'Marty' Waters (red card) 45+1'	Report	David Cassidy 28'; Philip Gorman 45'; Paddy Kavanagh 76'	Referee: Neil Doyle (Dublin)

20 July 2012 18	Shelbourne	1 – 2	Drogheda United	Tolka Park, Dublin
20.00 IST	Conan Byrne 74'; Stephen Paisley (red card) 86'	Report	Cathal Brady 12'; Gavin Brennan 90+3'	Attendance: 1,131; Referee: Damien Hancock (Dublin)

27 July 2012 19	Cork City	0 – 0	Shelbourne	Turners Cross, Cork
19.45 IST	Keigan Parker (red card) 85'	Report		Attendance: 2,689; Referee: Pádraig Sutton (Clare)

10 August 2012 20	Shelbourne	1 – 2	UCD	Tolka Park, Dublin
20.00 IST	Philip Hughes 82'	Report	David McMillan 41'; Paul Corry 87'	Attendance: 751; Referee: Graham Kelly (Cork)

17 August 2012 21	Shelbourne	1 – 3	Sligo Rovers	Tolka Park, Dublin
20.00 IST	Paddy Kavanagh 83'	Report	Jason McGuinness 2'; Gavin Peers 16'; Mark Quigley 76' (pen.)	Attendance: 1,205; Referee: Paul Tuite (Dublin)

20 August 2012 22	Bohemians	2 – 2	Shelbourne	Dalymount Park, Dublin
19.45 IST	Evan McMillan 77'; Keith Ward 90+2' (pen.)	Report	Philip Hughes 39' (pen.); Kevin Dawson 83'	Attendance: 1,229; Referee: Alan Kelly (Cork)

31 August 2012 23	Shelbourne	0 – 2	Derry City	Tolka Park, Dublin
20.00 IST		Report	David McDaid 8'; Stephen McLaughlin 56'	Attendance: 728; Referee: Pádraig Sutton (Clare)

7 September 2012 24	Shamrock Rovers	2 – 2	Shelbourne	Tallaght Stadium, Dublin
20.00 IST	Ciarán Kilduff 27'; Ronan Finn 82'	Report	Paddy Kavanagh 52'; Philip Gorman 77'	Referee: Derek Tomney (Dublin)

10 September 2012 25	Shelbourne	0 – 2	St. Patrick's Athletic	Tolka Park, Dublin
20.00 IST	Anto Murphy (red card) 84'	Report	Chris Fagan 70'; Vinny Faherty 90+4'	Attendance: 1,057; Referee: Anthony Buttimer (Cork)

21 September 2012 26	Dundalk	0 – 1	Shelbourne	Oriel Park, Dundalk
19.45 IST	Marc Griffin (red card) 86'	Report	Paddy Kavanagh 41'	Referee: Graham Kelly (Cork)

28 September 2012 27	Shelbourne	0 – 0	Bray Wanderers	Tolka Park, Dublin
20.00 IST		Report		Attendance: 716; Referee: Paul McLaughlin (Monaghan)

1 October 2012 28	Drogheda United	2 – 1	Shelbourne	Hunky Dorys Park, Drogheda
19.45 IST	Declan O'Brien 20' (pen.); Ryan Brennan 85'; Gavin Brennan (red card) 57'	Report	Philip Hughes 88'; Gareth Matthews (red card) 57'	Attendance: 631; Referee: Neil Doyle (Dublin)

13 October 2012 29	Shelbourne	3 – 2	Cork City	Tolka Park, Dublin
20.00 IST	David Cassidy 53'; Philip Hughes 62' (pen.); Conan Byrne 72'	Report	Vinny Sullivan 26'; Kevin Murray 42'	Attendance: 1,007; Referee: Rob Rogers (Dublin)

26 October 2012 30	UCD	1 – 1	Shelbourne	UCD Bowl, Dublin
19.45 IST	Hughie Douglas 21'	Report	David Cassidy 2'	Referee: Neil Doyle (Dublin)

==== Expunged league result ====
4 May 2012	Shelbourne	2 – 1	Monaghan United	Tolka Park, Dublin
20.00 IST	Paddy Kavanagh 61'; David Cassidy 71'	Report	Willo McDonagh 54' (pen.)	Attendance: 805; Referee: Graham Kelly (Cork)

==== League of Ireland Premier Division table ====
Pos	Team	Pld	W	D	L	GF	GA	GD	Pts	Qualification or relegation
1	Sligo Rovers (C)	30	17	10	3	53	23	+30	61	Qualification for Champions League second qualifying round
2	Drogheda United	30	17	6	7	51	36	+15	57	Qualification for Europa League first qualifying round
3	St Patrick's Athletic	30	15	10	5	44	22	+22	55	Qualification for Europa League first qualifying round
4	Shamrock Rovers	30	14	10	6	56	37	+19	52	
5	Derry City	30	11	6	13	36	36	0	39	Qualification for Europa League second qualifying round (Note: Derry City qualified for the UEFA Europa League second qualifying round after winning the 2012 FAI Cup Final.)
6	Cork City	30	8	12	10	38	36	+2	36	
7	Bohemians	30	9	9	12	35	38	−3	36	
8	Shelbourne	30	9	8	13	35	43	−8	35	
9	UCD	30	8	7	15	32	48	−16	31	
10	Bray Wanderers	30	5	10	15	33	54	−21	25	
11	Dundalk (O)	30	4	8	18	23	63	−40	20	Qualification for relegation play-off
12	Monaghan United (R)	0	0	0	0	0	0	0	0	Withdrew from league (Note: Monaghan United withdrew after 14 games. Their record was expunged.)

(C) Champions; (O) Play-off winners; (R) Relegated

==== League results summary ====
Overall								Home						Away					
Pld	W	D	L	GF	GA	GD	Pts	W	D	L	GF	GA	GD	W	D	L	GF	GA	GD
30	9	8	13	35	43	−8	35	4	3	8	19	23	−4	5	5	5	16	20	−4

Last updated: 26 October 2012.
Source: League of Ireland Premier Division Fixtures

==== League form/results by round ====
Home ground: Tolka Park

Round	1	2	3	4	5	6	7	8	9	10	11	12	13	14	15	16	17	18	19	20	21	22	23	24	25	26	27	28	29	30
Ground	H	A	H	A	H	A	H	A	H	A	A	H	A	H	A	H	A	H	A	H	H	A	H	A	H	A	H	A	H	A
Result	D	W	W	L	D	D	W	L	L	W	L	L	W	L	L	W	W	L	D	L	L	D	L	D	L	W	D	L	W	D
Position	5	3	1	6	6	6	4	5	6	5	6	6	6	6	8	5	5	5	6	6	7	7	7	8	8	8	7	8	6	8

Updated to match(es) played on 26 October 2012. Source: League of Ireland Premier Division Fixtures
A = Away; H = Home; W = Win; D = Draw; L = Loss

=== FAI Cup ===
25 May 2012 Second round	Bray Wanderers	1 – 1	Shelbourne	Carlisle Grounds, Bray
19.05 IST	Kieran 'Marty' Waters 63'	Report	Barry Clancy 35'	Referee: Damien Hancock (Dublin)

28 May 2012 Replay	Shelbourne	1 – 0	Bray Wanderers	Tolka Park, Dublin
20.00 IST	Philip Gorman 45+1'	Report		Referee: Neil Doyle (Dublin)

24 August 2012 Third round	Shelbourne	3 – 2	Cherry Orchard	Tolka Park, Dublin
20.00 IST	Philip Hughes 39' (pen.) 79'; Conan Byrne 82'	Report	Marc Hughes 30' (pen.) 84'	Attendance: 442; Referee: Rob Rogers (Dublin)

14 September 2012 Quarter-finals	Shelbourne	2 – 1	Shamrock Rovers	Tolka Park, Dublin
20.00 IST	Philip Hughes 30' 71'	Report	Seán Gannon 90+2'; Ken Oman (red card) 42'	Attendance: 2,255; Referee: Alan Kelly (Cork)

7 October 2012 Semi-finals	Derry City	1 – 1	Shelbourne	Brandywell Stadium, Derry
13.45 IST	David McDaid 58'	Report	David Cassidy 5'	Referee: Damien Hancock (Dublin)

10 October 2012 Replay	Shelbourne	0 – 3	Derry City	Tolka Park, Dublin
20.00 IST		Report	Stephen McLaughlin 44' 62'; David McDaid 68'	Attendance: 1,477; Referee: Anthony Buttimer (Cork)

=== League of Ireland Cup ===
26 March 2012 First round	Shelbourne	1 – 0	Mervue United	Tolka Park, Dublin
20.00 IST	David Cassidy 25'	Report		Attendance: 180; Referee: Phil Caschera (Dublin)

9 April 2012 Second round	Shelbourne	1 – 2 (a.e.t.)	Bray Wanderers	Tolka Park, Dublin
17.00 IST	Stephen Last 85' (o.g.)	Report	Jonathan Kelty 26'; Seán Houston 112'	Attendance: 280; Referee: Graham Kelly (Cork)

=== Leinster Senior Cup ===
9 February 2012 Fourth round	Wexford Youths	1 – 4	Shelbourne	Tolka Park, Dublin
20.00 GMT	Danny Furlong 71' (pen.)	Report	Conan Byrne 4' 35' 75'; Philip Hughes 20'	Attendance: 213; Referee: Neil Doyle (Dublin)

30 April 2012 Quarter-finals	Crumlin United	1 – 2	Shelbourne	Captain's Road, Dublin
18.30 IST	Martin Cramer 13' (pen.)	Report	Philip Hughes 43'; Paul Byrne 45+1'; John Sullivan (red card) 82'

2 July 2012 Semi-finals	Shelbourne	2 – 4	Shamrock Rovers	Tolka Park, Dublin
20.00 IST	Philip Hughes 73'; Philip Gorman 90+3'	Report	Killian Brennan 5'; Aaron Greene 32'; Daryl Kavanagh 34'; Chris Turner 44'	Referee: John Grimes (Dublin)

=== Friendlies ===
30 January 2012	Leixlip United	0 – 4	Shelbourne	Leixlip Amenities Centre, Leixlip
19.45 GMT			Paul Byrne; Anto Murphy

4 February 2012	Shelbourne	2 – 0	Longford Town	AUL Complex, Dublin
14.00 GMT	Conan Byrne; Brendan McGill		Mark Salmon (penalty missed) (pen.)

13 February 2012	Glebe North	0 – 4	Shelbourne	Market Green, Dublin
19.45 GMT			Philip Gorman; Paul Byrne; David Cassidy; Philip Hughes

17 February 2012	Shelbourne	1 – 0	Mervue United	Whitehall, Dublin
19.45 GMT	Philip Gorman 18'	Report

16 July 2012	Shelbourne	0 – 0	Millwall	Tolka Park, Dublin
19.45 IST		Report		Referee: Neil Doyle (Dublin)

4 August 2012	Swords Celtic	0 – 1	Shelbourne	Balheary, Dublin
15.00 IST		Report	Stephen Paisley 20'

== 2012 season statistics ==
As of 20 October 2012.

=== Player appearances/goals ===
No.	Pos	Nat	Player	Total		Premier Div		FAI Cup		League Cup		Leinster SC	
No.	Pos	Nat	Player	Apps	Goals	Apps	Goals	Apps	Goals	Apps	Goals	Apps	Goals
1	GK	(Republic of Ireland) IRL	Dean Delany	18	0	11	0	3	0	2	0	2	0
2	DF	(Republic of Ireland) IRL	Gareth Matthews	21	0	15	0	2	0	1	0	3	0
3	DF	(Republic of Ireland) IRL	Lorcan Fitzgerald	18	0	15	0	1	0	1	0	1	0
4	DF	(Republic of Ireland) IRL	Andy Boyle	32	0	22	0	6	0	1	0	3	0
5	DF	(Republic of Ireland) IRL	Stephen Paisley	26	0	18	0	3	0	2	0	3	0
6	MF	(Republic of Ireland) IRL	Glenn Cronin	30	1	22	1	6	0	0	0	2	0
7	MF	(Republic of Ireland) IRL	Conan Byrne	29	6	23	2	3	1	0	0	3	3
8	MF	(Republic of Ireland) IRL	David Cassidy	35	6	25	4	6	1	2	1	2	0
9	FW	(Republic of Ireland) IRL	Philip Hughes	38	18	28	11	6	4	1	0	3	3
10	MF	(Republic of Ireland) IRL	Kevin Dawson	34	2	24	2	6	0	2	0	2	0
11	MF	(Republic of Ireland) IRL	Brendan McGill	14	0	10	0	1	0	1	0	2	0
12	DF	(Republic of Ireland) IRL	Brian Shortall	28	0	22	0	4	0	1	0	1	0
13	GK	(Republic of Ireland) IRL	Paul Skinner	7	0	6	0	0	0	0	0	1	0
14	MF	(Republic of Ireland) IRL	Paddy Kavanagh	37	6	28	6	6	0	1	0	2	0
15	MF	(Republic of Ireland) IRL	Barry Clancy	23	1	16	0	3	1	2	0	2	0
16	MF	(Republic of Ireland) IRL	Stephen Hurley	24	0	19	0	1	0	2	0	2	0
17	DF	(Republic of Ireland) IRL	Sean Byrne	18	0	13	0	3	0	1	0	1	0
18	FW	(Republic of Ireland) IRL	Paul Byrne	16	2	11	1	3	0	1	0	1	1
19	FW	(Republic of Ireland) IRL	Philip Gorman	33	8	23	6	6	1	2	0	2	1
23	DF	(Republic of Ireland) IRL	Ian Ryan	25	0	17	0	5	0	1	0	2	0
24	MF	(Republic of Ireland) IRL	Anto Murphy	23	0	17	0	3	0	2	0	1	0
30	GK	(Scotland) SCO	Chris Bennion	17	0	14	0	3	0	0	0	0	0
35	MF	(Republic of Ireland) IRL	John Sullivan	8	0	5	0	0	0	2	0	1	0

=== Top goalscorers ===
Position	Nation	Name	Total	Premier Div	FAI Cup	League Cup	Leinster SC
1	(Republic of Ireland)	Philip Hughes	18	11	4	0	3
2	(Republic of Ireland)	Philip Gorman	8	6	1	0	1
3	(Republic of Ireland)	Conan Byrne	6	2	1	0	3
	(Republic of Ireland)	David Cassidy	6	4	1	1	0
	(Republic of Ireland)	Paddy Kavanagh	6	6	0	0	0
6	(Republic of Ireland)	Paul Byrne	2	1	0	0	1
	(Republic of Ireland)	Kevin Dawson	2	2	0	0	0
8	(Republic of Ireland)	Barry Clancy	1	0	1	0	0
	(Republic of Ireland)	Glenn Cronin	1	1	0	0	0
		Own Goals	3	2	0	1	0
		TOTALS	53	35	8	2	8

== See also ==
- 2012 League of Ireland
