= 2011 FAI Cup final =

- Event: 2011 FAI Cup
Shelbourne	Sligo Rovers
1	1
- Sligo won 4-1 on penalties
- Date: 6 November 2011
- Venue: Aviva Stadium, Dublin
- Man of the Match: Stephen Paisley (Shelbourne)
- Referee: Richie Winter (Wicklow)
- Attendance: 21,662
- Weather: Cold but dry and sunny

The 2011 Ford FAI Cup final was the 88th final of the FAI Cup, the oldest domestic football competition in Ireland. The match took place on 6 November 2011 at Aviva Stadium in Dublin for the second consecutive year. The two clubs contesting the 2011 final were Premier Division side, Sligo Rovers and First Division side, Shelbourne, with the victors guaranteeing a berth in the UEFA Europa League. The 2011 final was Sligo Rovers tenth and Shelbourne's eighteenth FAI Cup Final in their 116 years of existence. The game took place on Sunday, 6 November 2011 at 3.30pm local time. The match was aired live on RTÉ Two from 3pm to 6.40pm. Sligo retained the cup after a four one win in a penalty shoot-out.

== Background ==
For Sligo Rovers, it was their 3rd final in row. Sligo Rovers won the last cup final in 2010, beating Shamrock Rovers on penalties 2–0, having lost the 2009 final 2-1 to the now defunct Sporting Fingal. The last time Shelbourne reached the final was in 2000, the game in which they beat Bohemians F.C. to win the cup. Rovers have a total of 3 titles and Shels have a total of 7 titles.

== Pre-match ==
=== Officials ===
Wicklow-based referee Richie Winter was named as the referee for the 2011 FAI Cup Final on 25 October 2011. Winter's previous assignments in the FAI Cup Final included a position as fourth official for the 2008 FAI Cup Final.

His assistants for the 2011 final were Mark Gavin from Kildare, Dermot Broughton from Limerick, with Graham Kelly of Cork as the fourth official.

=== Kits ===
Since both sides' first-choice kits are red, the toss off a coin was used to decide which team had choice of kit. Shelbourne won the toss and wore their home kit of red shirt and white shorts, while Sligo Rovers wore their away kit of white shirts and white shorts.

== Match ==
=== Details ===
2011 FAI Cup
6 November 2011
15:30
Final

Shelbourne	1 – 1 (a.e.t.)	Sligo Rovers
Hughes 30'; Clancy (red card) 36'	Report	48' Davoren
Penalties
Karl Bermingham (penalty scored); Kevin Dawson (penalty missed); Colm James (penalty missed)	1 – 4	(penalty scored) Eoin Doyle; (penalty scored) Richie Ryan; (penalty scored) Alan Keane; (penalty scored) Raffaele Cretaro

Aviva Stadium, Dublin
Attendance: 21,662
Referee: Richie Winter (Wicklow)

Shelbourne	Sligo Rovers

SHELBOURNE:
GK	1	(Republic of Ireland) Dean Delany
DF	2	(Republic of Ireland) Andy Boyle
DF	4	(Republic of Ireland) Sean Byrne
DF	5	(Republic of Ireland) Stephen Paisley
DF	3	(Republic of Ireland) Ian Ryan
MF	7	(Republic of Ireland) David Cassidy
MF	6	(Republic of Ireland) Barry Clancy
MF	8	(Republic of Ireland) Kevin Dawson
MF	11	(Republic of Ireland) Brendan McGill
MF	10	(Republic of Ireland) John Sullivan
FW	9	(Republic of Ireland) Philip Hughes
Manager:
(Republic of Ireland) Alan Mathews

SLIGO ROVERS:
GK	1	(Republic of Ireland) Brendan Clarke
DF	3	(Republic of Ireland) Iarfhlaith Davoren
DF	2	(Republic of Ireland) Alan Keane
DF	20	(Republic of Ireland) Jason McGuinness
DF	4	(Republic of Ireland) Gavin Peers
MF	7	(England) John Dillon
MF	8	(Republic of Ireland) John Russell
MF	6	(Republic of Ireland) Richie Ryan
MF	5	(England) Danny Ventre
FW	11	(Republic of Ireland) Eoin Doyle
MF	22	(Republic of Ireland) Aaron Greene
Manager:
(England) Paul Cook

== See also ==
- 2011 FAI Cup
- 2011 League of Ireland Cup Final
