= 1981 in Ireland =

- Centuries: 18th; 19th; 20th; 21st
- Decades: 1960s; 1970s; 1980s; 1990s; 2000s
- See also: 1981 in Northern Ireland; Other events of 1981; List of years in Ireland

Events from the year 1981 in Ireland.

== Incumbents ==
- President: Patrick Hillery
- Taoiseach:
  - Charles Haughey (FF) (until 30 June 1981)
  - Garret FitzGerald (FG) (from 30 June 1981)
- Tánaiste:
  - George Colley (FF) (until 30 June 1981)
  - Michael O'Leary (Lab) (from 30 June 1981)
- Minister for Finance:
  - Gene Fitzgerald (FF) (until 30 June 1981)
  - John Bruton (FG) (from 30 June 1981)
- Chief Justice: Tom O'Higgins
- Dáil:
  - 21st (until 21 May 1981)
  - 22nd (from 30 June 1981)
- Seanad:
  - 14th (until 16 July 1981)
  - 15th (from 8 October 1981)

== Events ==
=== February ===
- 6 February – Attacks on shipping in Lough Foyle (1981–82): Liverpool-registered coal ship Nellie M was bombed and sunk by a Provisional Irish Republican Army unit using a hijacked pilot boat in Lough Foyle.
- 14 February – Stardust fire: A fire at the Stardust nightclub in Artane, Dublin, in the early hours killed 48 young people and injured 214. In 2024 these would be declared as unlawful killings.

=== March ===
- 1 March – Bobby Sands began a hunger strike in the Maze Prison (Long Kesh) near Lisburn (Northern Ireland).
- 5 March – A petrol strike ended when 800 tanker drivers resumed work.

=== April ===
- 10 April – Hunger striker Bobby Sands was elected Member of Parliament (MP) for Fermanagh and South Tyrone in the Parliament of the United Kingdom.

=== May ===
- 2 May – Aer Lingus Flight 164, a Boeing 737 en route from Dublin to London was hijacked and ordered to fly to Tehran. The flight was diverted to Paris and the hijacker, Laurence Downey, was arrested.
- 5 May – Bobby Sands died on the 66th day of his hunger strike in the Maze Prison.
- 12 May – Francis Hughes, previously the most wanted man in Northern Ireland, died on the 59th day of his hunger strike in the Maze Prison.
- 21 May – Raymond McCreesh and Patsy O'Hara died on the 61st day of their hunger strike in the Maze Prison.

=== June ===
- 11 June – 1981 Irish general election. Fianna Fáil lost seats and a Fine Gael–Labour Party coalition government was formed. Kieran Doherty, on hunger strike in the Maze Prison, was elected TD for Cavan–Monaghan.
- 30 June – Fine Gael leader Garret FitzGerald was elected taoiseach as the 22nd Dáil Éireann assembled.

=== July ===
- 8 July – Provisional Irish Republican Army member Joe McDonnell died on the 61st day of his hunger strike.
- 25 July – During a fire at Portlaoise Prison, Irish Army Private Thomas Metcalfe scaled a forty-foot (12 m) high drainpipe in darkness and rescued a comrade trapped on a blazing rooftop. He later received the Military Medal for Gallantry.

=== August ===
- 1 August – Irish National Liberation Army member Kevin Lynch died on the 71st day of his hunger strike in the Maze Prison.
- 2 August – Kieran Doherty, TD, died on the 73rd day of his hunger strike in Long Kesh.

=== September ===
- 11 September – The Irish Sugar Company announced that it was to close its factory in Tuam, County Galway.

=== December ===
- 5 December – Harry Flynn of the terrorist Irish National Liberation Army (INLA) survived a murder attempt in Dublin, ordered by the INLA leader Gerard Steenson. Flynn was in The Flowing Tide pub at the corner of Abbey Street and Marlborough Street in the city centre when a gunman entered and shot at Flynn, but his gun jammed and he fled. Flynn survived his wounds.
- 19 December – Penlee lifeboat disaster: The Arklow-bound, Dublin-registered Union Star was lost on its maiden voyage off Cornwall. Sixteen lives were lost, eight from the Union Star and eight from RNLB Solomon Browne (ON 954) who died while attempting rescue.
- 27 December – Supporters of the Society for the Protection of Unborn Children marched in Dublin to demand a referendum for an anti-abortion amendment to the Constitution.

=== Undated ===
- The Green Party was founded as the Ecology Party of Ireland by Dublin teacher Christopher Fettes.

== Arts and literature ==
- 4 April – Ireland hosted the Eurovision Song Contest, presented by Doireann Ní Bhriain and aired on RTÉ Television.
- 1 August - The first Occasion at the Castle music festival was held in Castlebar, County Mayo. Headerliners included Ian Dury and the Blockheads, The Pretenders, Loudon Wainwright III, The Undertones, and the folk duo Kate and Anna McGarrigle.
- 16 August – The first Slane Concert was held at Slane Castle featuring performers Thin Lizzy, Hazel O'Connor, The Bureau, Megahype, Rose Tattoo, Sweet Savage, and U2.
- 14 September – Artist and writer Christy Brown was buried in Glasnevin Cemetery, Dublin.
- An association of artists, Aosdána, was established.
- Molly Keane's novel Good Behaviour was published, her first for almost thirty years, and the first under her own name.
- Rita Kelly's poetry Dialann sa Díseart was published.
- Neil Jordan was awarded the Rooney Prize for Irish Literature.
- English-born painter Derek Hill donated St. Columb's Rectory, near Churchill, County Donegal (his home since 1954), along with a considerable collection including work by Pablo Picasso, Edgar Degas, Georges Braque, Graham Sutherland, and Jack Butler Yeats, to the Irish State.
- A proposed design for a new Áras an Uachtaráin (presidential mansion) was created by Rem Koolhaas, but was never built.

== Sport ==
=== Association football ===
- Ireland narrowly missed qualifying for the 1982 World Cup finals in Spain on goal difference.

=== Gaelic football ===
- Kerry beat Offaly by 1–12 to 0–8 to win their fourth successive All-Ireland Senior Football Championship. It was only the third time that a four-in-a-row has been achieved.

=== Golf ===
- The Irish Open was won by Sam Torrance (Scotland).

=== Hurling ===
- Offaly won their first All-Ireland Senior Hurling Championship, beating Galway by 2–12 to 0–15 in the final.

== Births ==
- 1 January – Jonas Armstrong, actor.
- 26 January
  - Glen Fitzpatrick, association footballer.
  - Colin O'Donoghue, Actor
- 31 January – Dan Connor, association footballer.
- 12 February – Lisa Hannigan, singer and musician.
- 13 February – Liam Miller, association footballer (died 2018).
- 24 February – Brian O'Callaghan, association footballer.
- 26 February – Ronan Curran, Cork hurler.
- 3 March – Ger Spillane, Cork Gaelic footballer.
- 22 March – Brendan McGill, association footballer.
- 23 March – Colin Cryan, association footballer.
- 10 April – Des Byrne, association footballer.
- 18 April – John O'Hara, association footballer.
- 24 April – Maeve Higgins, comedian.
- 25 April – Thomas Butler, association footballer.
- 10 May – Barry Cahill, Dublin Gaelic footballer.
- 14 June – Dominick Joyce, cricketer.
- 1 July – Tadhg Kennelly, Gaelic footballer, Australian rules football player.
- 16 July – Tom Kenny, Cork hurler.
- 25 July – Fergal Devitt, professional wrestler.
- 1 August – Stephen Hunt, association footballer.
- 14 August – Brian Hogan, Kilkenny hurler.
- 1 September – Niall McCarthy, Cork hurler.
- 12 September – Philip Hughes, association footballer.
- 14 September – Glenn Cronin, association footballer.
- 24 September – Richie Byrne, association footballer.
- 30 September – Cecelia Ahern, author, daughter of Bertie Ahern.
- 4 October – Alan Bennett, association footballer.
- 6 October – Graham Barrett, association footballer.
- 10 October – Una Healy, singer-songwriter.
- 12 October – John Thompson, association footballer.
- 17 October – Steven Gray, association footballer.
- 24 October – David McGill, association footballer.
- 8 November – Niall O'Brien, cricketer.
- 15 November – Kevin Grogan, association footballer.
- 15 November – Brian Shelley, association footballer.
- 17 November – Sean Godley, poet.
- 22 November – Jonathan Douglas, association footballer.
- 8 December – Aidan Price, association footballer.
- 29 December – Paul Heffernan, association footballer.

=== Full date unknown ===
- Derek Hardiman, Galway hurler.
- Natasha Nic Gairbheith, 2004 Miss Ireland.
- Seán O'Connor, Limerick hurler.
- Kevin Tobin, Limerick hurler.
- Orla Tobin, 2003 Rose of Tralee winner.

== Deaths ==
- 1 January – Sir Anthony Esmonde, 15th Baronet, Fine Gael TD and Member of the European Parliament (born 1899).
- 21 January – Norman Stronge, Ulster Unionist Party politician and Speaker of the Northern Ireland House of Commons for 23 years (born 1894).
- 8 April – Gretta Bowen, artist (born 1880).
- 2 May – Tommy Moroney, association footballer and rugby player (born 1923).
- 17 June – Nora Connolly O'Brien, political activist, daughter of James Connolly (born 1892).
- 2 July – Billy Gillespie, association footballer (born 1891).
- 7 July – Donal Foley, Irish Times journalist.
- 21 August – Eddie Byrne, actor (born 1911).
- 24 August – Jackie Vernon, association footballer (born 1918).
- 7 September – Christy Brown, author, painter and poet (born 1932).
- 13 October – Oisín Kelly, sculptor (born 1915).
- 15 October – James Auchmuty, historian (born 1909).
- 17 November – Nano Reid, painter (born 1905).
- December – Fred Kiernan, association footballer (born 1919).

=== Full date unknown ===
- Muriel Brandt, painter (born 1909).

== See also ==
- 1981 in Irish television
