= 2005–06 Manchester City F.C. season =

English football club season

Manchester City
2005–06 season
- Owner: Publicly traded company
- Chairman: John Wardle
- Manager: Stuart Pearce
- Stadium: City of Manchester Stadium (a.k.a. Eastlands and CoMS)
- Premier League: 15th
- FA Cup: Quarter-final
- League Cup: Second round
- Top goalscorer: League: Andy Cole (9); All: Andy Cole and Darius Vassell (10 each)
- Highest home attendance: 47,192 v Manchester United; 14 January 2006
- Lowest home attendance: 27,779 v Scunthorpe United; 7 January 2006
- Average home league attendance: 42,856 – over 19 PL home games (4th highest in Premier League)
Home colours	Away colours	Third colours

Results summary – all competitions
	Wins	Draws	Losses	Win %
Home	12	2	9	52.2%
Away	4	4	13	19.0%
Both	16	6	22	36.4%

Results summary – Premier League
	Wins	Draws	Losses	Win %
Home	9	2	8	47.4%
Away	4	2	13	21.1%
Both	13	4	21	34.2%

The 2005–06 season was Manchester City Football Club's fourth consecutive season playing in the Premier League, the top division of English football, and its ninth season since the Premier League was first created with Manchester City as one of its original 22 founding member clubs. Overall, it was the team's 114th season playing in a division of English football, most of which have been spent in the top flight.

== Season review ==
The 2005–06 season proved tough for the club finishing 15th in the Premier League after a turbulent end to the season. The season began with last season's top goalscorer Shaun Wright-Phillips joining Premier League champions Chelsea for a fee of £21 million. Wright-Phillips was a fan favourite having made over 150 appearances for the club and winning Manchester City's Young Player of the Year award four times in succession.

In the following week, Manchester City announced the signings of Andy Cole from Fulham and Darius Vassell from Aston Villa. The Blues ended their preseason with a 3–1 victory against Greek champions Olympiacos in the Thomas Cook Trophy. In this match, City fans were given their first introduction to Yaya Touré who put the visitors ahead.

The club started the season unbeaten in their first five matches, taking 10 points from 12 matches. Manchester City manager Stuart Pearce was subsequently awarded the Barclays Manager of the Month award for August. City then went on to suffer three successive defeats in September, including a 3–0 defeat on penalties to League 1 side Doncaster, which saw them exit the Carling Cup in the Second Round.

The following months saw City's form continue to fluctuate. On December 4, Manchester City beat Charlton Athletic 5-2 at The Valley, setting a then-club record for their largest away win in the Premier League. Going into 2006, Manchester City were placed 9th in the League.

Robbie Fowler started off the new year with a hat-trick in the Third Round of the FA Cup against Scunthorpe. The following weekend, Manchester City won the Manchester Derby 3-1 at home, in a match that saw Cristiano Ronaldo receive a straight red card for a reckless lunge on Andy Cole midway through the second half.

The January Transfer Window saw Robbie Fowler return to Liverpool, Joey Barton hand-in a transfer request and Stuart Pearce splashing out £6 million on Heerenveen striker Georgios Samaras.

Manchester City's final hope of silverware was put to an end after a Dean Ashton brace led West Ham into the semi-finals of the FA Cup, eliminating City in the quarter-finals.

The season ended on disappointing form with losses in 9 of their 10 final matches in the Premier League. A winless City steadily drifted down the league from mid-table to 15th position before the season culminated.

== Team kit ==
For this season the shirt sponsor for all of the club's kits continued to be the previous season's sponsor, Thomas Cook, while the team kits were produced by the previous season's supplier, Reebok.

Home (version 1)	Home (version 2)	Away (version 1)	Away (version 2)	Third

== Friendly games ==
=== Pre-season ===
15 July 2005	Tranmere Rovers	1–0	Manchester City	Prenton, England
19:45 BST	Davies 90'	MCFC report Manchester Evening News report		Stadium: Prenton Park

16 July 2005	Macclesfield Town	1–1	Manchester City	Macclesfield, England
15:00 BST	Parkin 3'	MCFC report M.E.N. report	8' Hussain	Stadium: Moss Rose; Attendance: 4,420; Referee: Chris Foy (Merseyside)

==== Premier League Asia Trophy ====
20 July 2005	Bolton Wanderers	1–1 (5–4 p)	Manchester City	Bangkok, Thailand
21:45 MST; 14:45 BST	Davies 47'	MCFC report M.E.N. report	41' Barton	Stadium: Rajamangala Stadium; Attendance: 10,000; Referee: Chris Foy (Merseyside)
	Penalties
	Okocha (penalty scored); Diouf (penalty scored); Vaz Tê (penalty scored); Fadiga (penalty scored); Campo (penalty scored)		(penalty scored) Barton; (penalty scored) Flood; (penalty scored) Sun; (penalty scored) Bermingham; (penalty missed) B. Wright-Phillips

23 July 2005	Everton	1–1 (2–4 p)	Manchester City	Bangkok, Thailand
17:45 MST; 10:45 BST	Beattle 51' (pen.)	MCFC report M.E.N. report	24' Cole	Stadium: Rajamangala Stadium; Attendance: 8,000; Referee: Mark Clattenburg (Tyne & Wear)
	Penalties
	Weir (penalty missed); Ferguson (penalty scored); Bent (penalty missed); Kilbane (penalty scored)		(penalty scored) B. Wright-Phillips; (penalty scored) Mills; (penalty scored) Thatcher; (penalty scored) Flood

30 July 2005	Stoke City	1–2	Manchester City	Stoke-on-Trent, England
15:00 BST	Dyer 51'; Dyer (penalty missed) 68' (pen.)	MCFC report M.E.N. report	(red card) 67' Sun; 73' Cole; 81' B. Wright-Phillips	Stadium: Britannia Stadium; Referee: Phil Dowd (Staffordshire)

31 July 2005	Sheffield Wednesday	1–1	Manchester City	Sheffield, England
15:00 BST	Whelan 40'	MCFC report	61' Bermingham	Stadium: Hillsborough; Attendance: 12,796

==== Thomas Cook Trophy ====
6 August 2005	Manchester City	3–1	Olympiacos	Manchester, England
15:00 BST	Vassell 65'; B. Wright-Phillips 75', 79'	MCFC report M.E.N. report	27' Touré	Stadium: City of Manchester Stadium; Attendance: ~20,000

== Competitive games ==
=== Premier League ===
==== Position in final standings ====
Pos	Team	Pld	W	D	L	GF	GA	GD	Pts
13	Charlton Athletic	38	13	8	17	41	55	−14	47
14	Middlesbrough	38	12	9	17	48	58	−10	45
15	Manchester City	38	13	4	21	43	48	−5	43
16	Aston Villa	38	10	12	16	42	55	−13	42
17	Portsmouth	38	10	8	20	37	62	−25	38

Source: Barclays Premier League
Rules for classification: 1) points; 2) goal difference; 3) number of goals scored.

==== Results summary ====
Overall								Home						Away					
Pld	W	D	L	GF	GA	GD	Pts	W	D	L	GF	GA	GD	W	D	L	GF	GA	GD
38	13	4	21	43	48	−5	43	9	2	8	23	20	+3	4	2	13	20	28	−8

Last updated: 7 May 2006 (end of season).
Source: Premier League results 2005–06

==== Points breakdown ====
Points at home: 29
Points away from home: 14

Points against "Big Four" teams: 4
Points against promoted teams: 9

6 points: Aston Villa, Birmingham City, Charlton Athletic, Sunderland
4 points: Manchester United
3 points: Everton, Newcastle United, Portsmouth, West Ham United
1 point: Blackburn Rovers, Middlesbrough, West Bromwich Albion
0 points: Arsenal, Bolton Wanderers, Chelsea, Fulham, Liverpool,

Tottenham Hotspur, Wigan Athletic

==== Biggest & smallest ====
Biggest home wins: 4–1 vs. Birmingham City, 17 December 2005
3–0 vs. Newcastle United, 1 February 2006
Biggest home defeats: 1–3 vs. Arsenal, 4 May 2006
0–2 vs. Tottenham Hotspur, 4 January 2006
Biggest away win: 2–5 vs. Charlton Athletic, 4 December 2005
Biggest away defeats: 2–0 vs. West Bromwich Albion, 10 December 2005
& vs. Bolton Wanderers, 21 January 2006 & vs. Chelsea, 25 March 2006
& vs. Blackburn Rovers, 7 May 2006

Biggest home attendance: 47,192 vs. Manchester United, 14 January 2006
Smallest home attendance: 40,256 vs. Middlesbrough, 2 April 2006
Biggest away attendance: 67,839 vs. Manchester United, 10 September 2005
Smallest away attendance: 19,556 vs. Portsmouth, 11 March 2006

==== Results by round ====
Round	1	2	3	4	5	6	7	8	9	10	11	12	13	14	15	16	17	18	19	20	21	22	23	24	25	26	27	28	29	30	31	32	33	34	35	36	37	38
Ground	H	A	A	H	A	H	A	H	H	A	H	A	H	H	A	A	H	A	H	A	H	H	A	H	A	H	A	H	A	H	A	H	A	A	A	H	H	A
Result	D	W	W	W	D	L	L	W	W	L	W	L	D	L	W	L	W	L	L	D	L	W	L	W	L	W	L	W	L	L	L	L	L	L	W	L	L	L
Position	10	5	1	2	3	5	6	6	4	6	4	5	6	8	8	8	7	8	8	8	9	8	9	10	10	9	10	9	10	11	11	13	13	13	13	14	15	15

Updated to match(es) played on 7 May 2006 (end of season). Source: 2005–06 FA Premier League results
A = Away; H = Home; W = Win; D = Draw; L = Loss

==== Individual match reports ====
13 August 2005 1	Manchester City	0–0	West Bromwich Albion	Manchester, England
15:00 BST		Guardian report		Stadium: City of Manchester Stadium; Attendance: 42,983; Referee: Chris Foy

20 August 2005 2	Birmingham City	1–2	Manchester City	Birmingham, England
17:15 BST	Butt 7'	Guardian report	20' Barton; 46' Cole	Stadium: St Andrew's; Attendance: 26,366; Referee: Mark Clattenburg

23 August 2005 3	Sunderland	1–2	Manchester City	Sunderland, England
19:45 BST	Le Tallec 41'	Guardian report	9' Vassell; 35' Sinclair	Stadium: Stadium of Light; Attendance: 33,357; Referee: Peter Walton

27 August 2005 4	Manchester City	2–1	Portsmouth	Manchester, England
15:00 BST	Reyna 66'; Cole 69'	Guardian report BBC Sport report	52' Viafara	Stadium: City of Manchester Stadium; Attendance: 41,022; Referee: Alan Wiley

10 September 2005 5	Manchester United	1–1	Manchester City	Manchester, England
15:00 BST	van Nistelrooy 45'	Guardian report	75' Barton	Stadium: Old Trafford; Attendance: 67,839; Referee: Steve Bennett

18 September 2005 6	Manchester City	0–1	Bolton Wanderers	Manchester, England
16:00 BST		Guardian report	93' Speed	Stadium: City of Manchester Stadium; Attendance: 43,137; Referee: Mike Dean

24 September 2005 7	Newcastle United	1–0	Manchester City	Newcastle, England
15:00 BST	Owen 18'	Guardian report		Stadium: St James' Park; Attendance: 52,280; Referee: Graham Poll

2 October 2005 8	Manchester City	2–0	Everton	Manchester, England
11:15 BST	Mills 72'; Vassell 92'	Guardian report		Stadium: City of Manchester Stadium; Attendance: 42,681; Referee: Mark Halsey

16 October 2005 9	Manchester City	2–1	West Ham United	Manchester, England
16:00 BST	Cole 17', 55'	Guardian report	90' Zamora	Stadium: City of Manchester Stadium; Attendance: 43,647; Referee: Mark Clattenburg

22 October 2005 10	Arsenal	1–0	Manchester City	London, England
15:00 BST	Pires 61' (pen.)	Guardian report		Stadium: Highbury; Attendance: 38,119; Referee: Mike Riley

31 October 2005 11	Manchester City	3–1	Aston Villa	Manchester, England
20:00 GMT	Vassell 4', 26'; Cole 82'	Guardian report	64' Ridgewell	Stadium: City of Manchester Stadium; Attendance: 42,069; Referee: Dermot Gallagher

5 November 2005 12	Fulham	2–1	Manchester City	London, England
15:00 GMT	Malbranque 6', 44'	Guardian report	20' Croft	Stadium: Craven Cottage; Attendance: 22,241; Referee: Rob Styles

19 November 2005 13	Manchester City	0–0	Blackburn Rovers	Manchester, England
15:00 GMT		Guardian report		Stadium: City of Manchester Stadium; Attendance: 44,092; Referee: Martin Atkinson

26 November 2005 14	Manchester City	0–1	Liverpool	Manchester, England
15:00 GMT		Guardian report	60' Riise	Stadium: City of Manchester Stadium; Attendance: 47,105; Referee: Alan Wiley

4 December 2005 15	Charlton Athletic	2–5	Manchester City	London, England
16:00 GMT	Bent 36'; Bothroyd 73'	Guardian report	25', 84' Cole; 37' Sinclair; 69' Barton; 79' Vassell	Stadium: The Valley; Attendance: 25,289; Referee: Phil Dowd

10 December 2005 16	West Bromwich Albion	2–0	Manchester City	West Bromwich, England
15:00 GMT	Kamara 36'; Campbell 73'	Guardian report BBC Sport report	(red card) 87' Cole	Stadium: The Hawthorns; Attendance: 25,472; Referee: Mike Dean

17 December 2005 17	Manchester City	4–1	Birmingham City	Manchester, England
17:15 GMT	Sommeil 1'; Barton 13' (pen.); Sibierski 39'; Wright-Phillips 69'	Guardian report	73' Jarošík; (red card) 90' Vaesen	Stadium: City of Manchester Stadium; Attendance: 41,343; Referee: Steve Bennett

26 December 2005 18	Wigan Athletic	4–3	Manchester City	Wigan, England
15:00 GMT	Roberts 11', 44'; McCulloch 22'; Camara 70'	Guardian report	2' Sibierski; 76' Barton; 87' Cole	Stadium: JJB Stadium; Attendance: 25,017; Referee: Dermot Gallagher

28 December 2005 19	Manchester City	0–1	Chelsea	Manchester, England
19:45 GMT		Guardian report	79' Cole	Stadium: City of Manchester Stadium; Attendance: 46,587; Referee: Uriah Rennie

31 December 2005 20	Middlesbrough	0–0	Manchester City	Middlesbrough, England
15:00 GMT		Guardian report		Stadium: Riverside Stadium; Attendance: 28,022; Referee: Martin Atkinson

4 January 2006 21	Manchester City	0–2	Tottenham Hotspur	Manchester, England
20:00 GMT		Guardian report	30' Mido; 83' Keane	Stadium: City of Manchester Stadium; Attendance: 40,808; Referee: Alan Wiley

14 January 2006 22	Manchester City	3–1	Manchester United	Manchester, England
12:45 GMT	Sinclair 32'; Vassell 39'; Fowler 93'	Guardian report	76' van Nistelrooy; (red card) 66' Ronaldo	Stadium: City of Manchester Stadium; Attendance: 47,192; Referee: Steve Bennett

21 January 2006 23	Bolton Wanderers	2–0	Manchester City	Bolton, England
15:00 GMT	Borgetti 32'; Nolan 39'	Guardian report		Stadium: Reebok Stadium; Attendance: 26,466; Referee: Rob Styles

1 February 2006 24	Manchester City	3–0	Newcastle United	Manchester, England
19:45 BST	Riera 14'; Cole 38'; Vassell 62'	Guardian report BBC Sport report		Stadium: City of Manchester Stadium; Attendance: 42,413; Referee: Chris Foy

4 February 2006 25	Everton	1–0	Manchester City	Liverpool, England
15:00 GMT	Weir 7'	Guardian report	(red card) 90' Jordan	Stadium: Goodison Park; Attendance: 37,827; Referee: Andre Marriner

12 February 2006 26	Manchester City	3–2	Charlton Athletic	Manchester, England
15:00 BST	Dunne 22'; Samaras 53'; Barton 63'	Guardian report	50' D. Bent; 66' M. Bent	Stadium: City of Manchester Stadium; Attendance: 41,347; Referee: Mike Dean

26 February 2006 27	Liverpool	1–0	Manchester City	Liverpool, England
12:15 BST	Kewell 40'	Guardian report	(red card) 52' Barton	Stadium: Anfield; Attendance: 44,121; Referee: Dermot Gallagher

5 March 2006 28	Manchester City	2–1	Sunderland	Manchester, England
13:30 GMT	Samaras 8', 10'	Guardian report	24' Kyle; (red card) 85' Breen	Stadium: City of Manchester Stadium; Attendance: 42,200; Referee: Chris Foy

11 March 2006 29	Portsmouth	2–1	Manchester City	Portsmouth, England
15:00 GMT	Mendes 30', 90+3'	Guardian report	81' Dunne	Stadium: Fratton Park; Attendance: 19,556; Referee: Mark Halsey

18 March 2006 30	Manchester City	0–1	Wigan Athletic	Manchester, England
15:00 GMT		Guardian report	55' McCulloch	Stadium: City of Manchester Stadium; Attendance: 42,444; Referee: Martin Atkinson

25 March 2006 31	Chelsea	2–0	Manchester City	London, England
15:00 BST	Drogba 30', 33'	Guardian report	(red card) 45' Distin	Stadium: Stamford Bridge; Attendance: 42,321; Referee: Rob Styles

2 April 2006 32	Manchester City	0–1	Middlesbrough	Manchester, England
15:00 BST		Guardian report	42' Cattermole	Stadium: City of Manchester Stadium; Attendance: 40,256; Referee: Mike Riley

8 April 2006 33	Tottenham Hotspur	2–1	Manchester City	London, England
12:45 BST	Stalteri 43'; Carrick 49'	Guardian report	51' Samaras	Stadium: Stamford Bridge; Attendance: 36,157; Referee: Dermot Gallagher

15 April 2006 34	West Ham United	1–0	Manchester City	London, England
15:00 BST	Newton 15'	Guardian report		Stadium: Upton Park; Attendance: 34,105; Referee: Steve Bennett

25 April 2006 35	Aston Villa	0–1	Manchester City	Villa Park, Birmingham
19:45		Guardian report Guardian match facts	71' Vassell	Attendance: 26,422; Referee: Chris Foy

29 April 2006 36	Manchester City	1–2	Fulham	City of Manchester Stadium, Manchester
15:00	Dunne 69'	Guardian report BBC Sport report	83' John; 90' Malbranque	Attendance: 41,128; Referee: Peter Walton

4 May 2006 37	Manchester City	1–3	Arsenal	City of Manchester Stadium, Manchester
19:45	Sommeil 38'	Guardian report	29' Ljungberg; 77', 84' Reyes	Attendance: 41,875; Referee: Graham Poll

7 May 2006 38	Blackburn Rovers	2–0	Manchester City	Ewood Park, Blackburn
15:00	Khizanishvili 35'; Kuqi 53'; Tugay (red card) 59'	Guardian report		Attendance: 25,731; Referee: Howard Webb

=== League Cup ===
21 September 2005 Second Round	Doncaster Rovers	(0) 1–1 (0) (3–0 p)	Manchester City	Doncaster, England
19:45 BST	McIndoe 118' (pen.)	Guardian report BBC Sport report	95' (pen.) Vassell; (red card) 106' Onuoha (rescinded at end of game)	Stadium: Earth Stadium; Attendance: 8,228; Referee: Graham Salisbury
	Penalties
	McIndoe (penalty scored); Coppinger (penalty scored); Heffeman (penalty scored)		(penalty missed) Vassell; (penalty missed) Sibierski; (penalty missed) Dunne

=== FA Cup ===
7 January 2006 Third Round	Manchester City	3–1	Scunthorpe United	Manchester, England
15:00 GMT	Fowler 47', 56', 64'	Guardian report	17' Keogh	Stadium: City of Manchester Stadium; Attendance: 27,779; Referee: Andy Hall

28 January 2006 Fourth Round	Manchester City	1–0	Wigan Athletic	Manchester, England
15:00 GMT	Cole 83'	Guardian report		Stadium: City of Manchester Stadium; Attendance: 30,811; Referee: Howard Webb

19 February 2006 Fifth Round	Aston Villa	1–1	Manchester City	Birmingham, England
18:30 GMT	Baroš 72'	Guardian report	90+3' Richards	Stadium: Villa Park; Attendance: 23,847; Referee: Graham Poll

14 March 2006 Fifth Round Replay	Manchester City	2–1	Aston Villa	Manchester, England
19:45 GMT	Samaras 17'; Vassell 49'	Guardian report	85' Davis	Stadium: City of Manchester Stadium; Attendance: 33,006; Referee: Phil Dowd

20 March 2006 Sixth Round	Manchester City	1–2	West Ham United	Manchester, England
20:05 GMT	Sun (red card) 56'; Musampa 85'	Guardian report	41', 69' Ashton	Stadium: City of Manchester Stadium; Attendance: 39,357; Referee: Howard Webb

== First-team squad ==
Note: Flags indicate national team as defined under FIFA eligibility rules; some limited exceptions apply. Players may hold more than one non-FIFA nationality.

No.	Pos.	Nation	Player
1	GK	ENG	David James
2	DF	FRA	David Sommeil
3	DF	WAL	Ben Thatcher
4	MF	FIN	Tuomas Haapala
5	DF	FRA	Sylvain Distin
6	MF	USA	Claudio Reyna
8	MF	ENG	Joey Barton
9	FW	ENG	Andy Cole
10	MF	FRA	Antoine Sibierski
11	FW	ENG	Darius Vassell
12	GK	ENG	Nicky Weaver
14	MF	NED	Kiki Musampa (on loan from Atlético Madrid)
16	DF	ENG	Nedum Onuoha
17	DF	CHN	Sun Jihai
18	DF	ENG	Danny Mills
19	MF	ESP	Albert Riera (on loan from Espanyol)

No.	Pos.	Nation	Player
20	FW	GRE	Georgios Samaras
22	DF	IRL	Richard Dunne
25	GK	BEL	Geert De Vlieger
26	DF	ENG	Matt Mills
27	DF	DEN	Mikkel Bischoff
28	MF	ENG	Trevor Sinclair
33	GK	DEN	Kasper Schmeichel
36	FW	IRL	Karl Bermingham
37	MF	ENG	Ian Bennett
38	MF	IRL	Stephen Ireland
40	MF	ENG	Lee Croft
41	DF	ENG	Stephen Jordan
42	FW	ENG	Bradley Wright-Phillips
43	FW	ENG	Ishmael Miller
44	MF	IRL	Willo Flood
45	DF	ENG	Micah Richards

=== Left club during season ===
Note: Flags indicate national team as defined under FIFA eligibility rules; some limited exceptions apply. Players may hold more than one non-FIFA nationality.

No.	Pos.	Nation	Player
7	FW	ENG	Robbie Fowler (to Liverpool)
20	MF	QAT	Yasser Hussein (released)

No.	Pos.	Nation	Player
31	MF	ENG	Jonathan D'Laryea (to Mansfield Town)

== Goal scorers ==
=== All competitions ===
Scorer	Goals
(England) Andy Cole	10
(England) Darius Vassell	10
(England) Joey Barton	6
(Greece) Georgios Samaras	5
(England) Robbie Fowler	4
(Republic of Ireland) Richard Dunne	3
(England) Trevor Sinclair	3
(France) Antoine Sibierski	2
(Guadeloupe) David Sommeil	2
(England) Lee Croft	1
(England) Danny Mills	1
(Netherlands) Kiki Musampa	1
(United States) Claudio Reyna	1
(England) Micah Richards	1
(Spain) Albert Riera	1
(England) Bradley Wright-Phillips	1

=== Premier League ===
Scorer	Goals
(England) Andy Cole	9
(England) Darius Vassell	8
(England) Joey Barton	6
(Greece) Georgios Samaras	4
(Republic of Ireland) Richard Dunne	3
(England) Trevor Sinclair	3
(France) Antoine Sibierski	2
(Guadeloupe) David Sommeil	2
(England) Lee Croft	1
(England) Robbie Fowler	1
(England) Danny Mills	1
(United States) Claudio Reyna	1
(Spain) Albert Riera	1
(England) Bradley Wright-Phillips	1

=== League Cup ===
Scorer	Goals
(England) Darius Vassell	1

=== FA Cup ===
Scorer	Goals
(England) Robbie Fowler	3
(England) Andy Cole	1
(Netherlands) Kiki Musampa	1
(England) Micah Richards	1
(Greece) Georgios Samaras	1
(England) Darius Vassell	1

Information current as of 7 May 2006 (end of season)

== Transfers and loans ==
=== Transfers in ===
Date	Pos.	Player	From club	Transfer fee
20 July 2005	FW	(England) Andy Cole	(England) Fulham	Free
27 July 2005	FW	(England) Darius Vassell	(England) Aston Villa	£2 million
16 August 2005	MF	(Qatar) Hussein Yasser	(Qatar) Al-Sadd Club	Unattached
1 January 2006	MF	(Finland) Tuomas Haapala	(Finland) MyPa-47	Free
30 January 2006	FW	(Greece) Georgios Samaras	(Netherlands) Heerenveen	£6 million
30 January 2006	DF	(England) Matthew Mills	(England) Southampton	Undisclosed

=== Transfers out ===
Exit date	Pos.	Player	To club	Transfer fee
2 June 2005	FW	(England) Jon Macken	(England) Crystal Palace	
11 June 2005	GK	(Denmark) Kevin Stuhr-Ellegaard	(Germany) Hertha BSC	
1 July 2005	MF	(Netherlands) Paul Bosvelt	(Netherlands) Heerenveen	
8 July 2005	MF	(France) Christian Negouai	(Belgium) Standard Liège	
18 July 2005	MF	(England) Shaun Wright-Phillips	(England) Chelsea	£21 million
1 January 2006	MF	(Qatar) Yasser Hussein	(Qatar) Al-Sadd Club	Released
23 January 2006	DF	(England) Danny Warrender	(England) Blackpool	Undisc.
27 January 2006	FW	(England) Robbie Fowler	(England) Liverpool	Free
31 January 2006	MF	(England) Jonathan D'Laryea	(England) Mansfield Town	Nominal fee
11 May 2006	MF	(Finland) Tuomas Haapala	(Norway) Sandefjord Fotball	Released
11 May 2006	FW	(Republic of Ireland) Karl Bermingham	(Northern Ireland) Newry City	Released
11 May 2006		Ian Bennett	Released	
11 May 2006		Paul Collins	Released	
11 May 2006		Michael Ward	Released	

=== Loans in ===
Start date	End date	Pos.	Player	From club
5 June 2005	11 May 2006	MF	(Netherlands) Kiki Musampa	(Spain) Atlético Madrid
5 January 2006	11 May 2006	MF	(Spain) Albert Riera	(Spain) Espanyol

=== Loans out ===
Start date	End date	Pos.	Player	To club
17 August 2005	18 October 2005	FW	(Republic of Ireland) Karl Bermingham	(England) Burnley
17 August 2005	18 October 2005	MF	(Republic of Ireland) Willo Flood	(England) Coventry City
21 October 2005	22 January 2006	MF	(England) Jonathan D'Laryea	(England) Mansfield Town
21 October 2005	22 January 2006	DF	(England) Danny Warrender	(England) Blackpool
4 November 2005	26 January 2006	GK	(England) Nicky Weaver	(England) Sheffield Wednesday
13 January 2006	30 January 2006	GK	(Denmark) Kasper Schmeichel	(England) Darlington
23 February 2006	30 May 2006	GK	(Denmark) Kasper Schmeichel	(England) Bury
10 March 2006	30 May 2006	DF	(Denmark) Mikkel Bischoff	(England) Sheffield Wednesday
