= Stephen Paisley =

Irish footballer

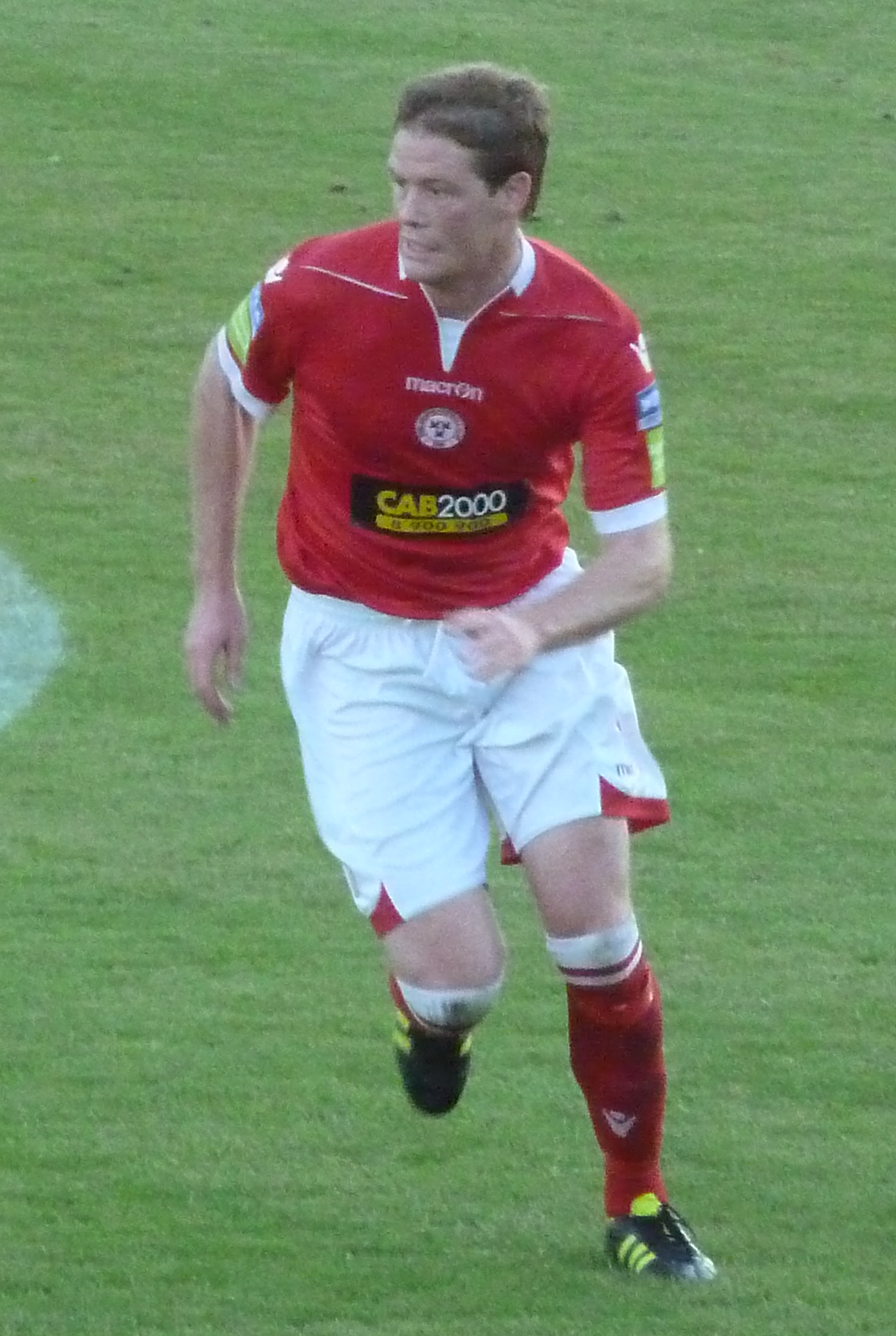

Personal information
- Date of birth: 28 July 1983 (age 43)
- Place of birth: Dublin, Republic of Ireland
- Position: Centre back

Youth career
- Cherry Orchard
- St. Mochta's

Senior career*
Years	Team	Apps	(Gls)
1999–2003	Manchester City	10	(4)
2003–2006	Longford Town	60	(4)
2007–2008	St. Patrick's Athletic	41	(4)
2009–2010	Sporting Fingal	22	(2)
2010–2012	Shelbourne	46	(4)
2013	Bohemians	4	(0)

International career
1999	Republic of Ireland U16	1	(0)
2002–2004	Republic of Ireland U21	7	(1)
- * Club domestic league appearances and goals as of 26 October 2012

Stephen Paisley (born 28 July 1983) is an Irish former professional footballer. Paisley was a central defender.

== Career ==
=== Early career ===
Paisley played schoolboy football for Dublin sides St. Mochta's and Cherry Orchard before joining English Premier League side Manchester City in 1999.

=== Manchester City ===
Paisley joined Manchester City in 1999 and spent three and a half years with the club playing at both youth and reserve team level.

=== Longford Town ===
Stephen joined Longford Town in 2003 after being released by Manchester City in the summer. In his first season at Longford Town he won an FAI Cup medal and in 2004 he won a cup double as Longford retained the FAI Cup and won the League of Ireland Cup.

=== St. Patrick's Athletic ===
In March 2007 Paisley abruptly departed Longford Town on the eve of the new season after he was declared a free agent and he subsequently signed for St. Patrick's Athletic. In his two seasons with the Inchicore club he finished a Premier Division runner-up and in all competitions made 56 appearances scoring 4 goals. On 22 November 2008 Paisley and seven other St Patrick's Athletic players were released by the club as the club's financial state deteriorated.

=== Sporting Fingal ===
Despite offers from Shamrock Rovers, Paisley signed for First Division club Sporting Fingal in January 2009. He was appointed club captain and in conjunction with the club and Dublin City University he began a MSc in Finance and Capital Markets alongside his full-time football schedule. He achieved promotion and won the FAI Cup for a third time in his first season with the new League of Ireland entity. Paisley's spell at the club was hampered by injuries and he parted ways with Sporting Fingal in July 2010 as he accepted full-time employment in the financial services sector.

=== Shelbourne ===
Paisley made a swift return to League of Ireland football by signing for Shelbourne on 17 August 2010, reuniting with his former Longford Town manager Alan Mathews at the Tolka Park club. In 2011 Paisley was instrumental in the Shelbourne gaining promotion back to the Premier Division and their Cup progress. He was awarded man of the match in the 2011 FAI Cup final and later won the League of Ireland 'Player of the Month' award for November.

=== Bohemians ===
On 16 January 2013 Paisley signed for Bohemians for the upcoming League of Ireland campaign. He made his league debut for the club against Sligo Rovers at Dalymount Park on 29 March. In May of that year, Stephen left the club after only 4 league appearances due to work commitments.

=== International ===
Paisley has represented Ireland at U16, U18, U19, U20 and U21 level and has competed at an U19 FIFA European Championship and U20 FIFA World cup.

== Honours ==
Longford Town

- FAI Cup (2): 2003, 2004
- League of Ireland Cup (1): 2004

Sporting Fingal

- FAI Cup (1): 2009

Airtricity SWAI Player of the Month Award November 2011.
