= Patrick Kavanagh (footballer, born 1985) =

Irish footballer

Paddy Kavanagh
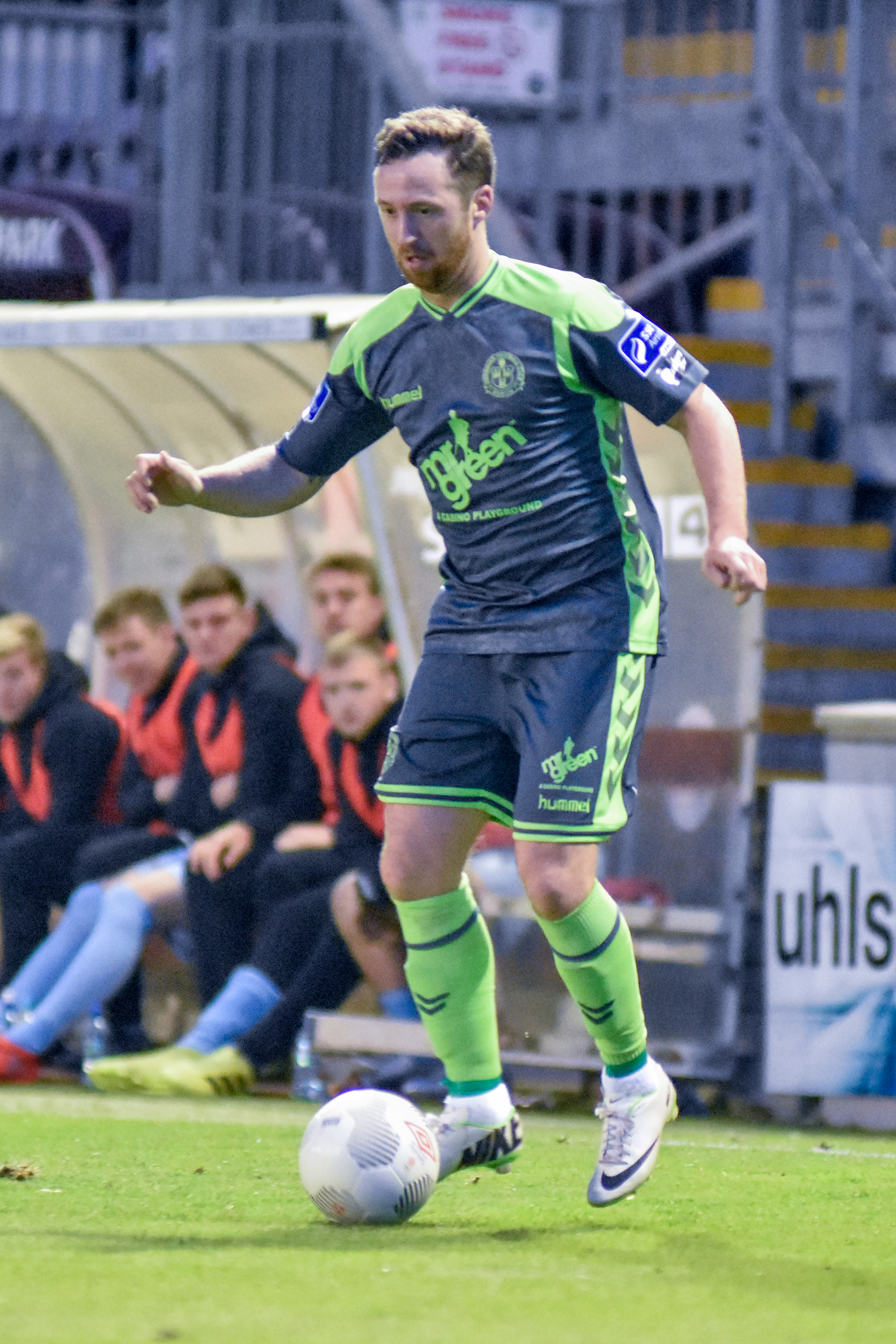
- Patrick Kavanagh (middle) in 2016

Personal information
- Date of birth: 29 December 1985 (age 40)
- Place of birth: Dublin, Ireland
- Position: Midfielder

Youth career
- St. Joseph's Boys
- Ballybrack Boys

Senior career*
Years	Team	Apps	(Gls)
2004	Bohemians	0	(0)
2004–2006	Wayside Celtic		
2006	UCD	10	(4)
2007	Birmingham City	0	(0)
2007–2009	Bray Wanderers	62	(9)
2009–2011	Shamrock Rovers	36	(0)
2012	Shelbourne	28	(6)
2013	Derry City	16	(1)
2014–2018	Bohemians	89	(6)

International career
2007	Republic of Ireland U23	1	(0)
- * Club domestic league appearances and goals as of 07:48, 11 March 2017 (UTC)

Patrick Kavanagh (born 29 December 1985) is an Irish former footballer who played as a winger.

== Career ==
=== Early career ===
Kavanagh's first clubs were St Joseph's Boys and Ballybrack Boys, where his talent was soon spotted by scouts. He signed for League of Ireland club Bohemians in 2004 but his opportunities at the club were restricted to appearances in the Gypsies' Under 21 side. Following his brief stint at Bohemians, Kavanagh signed for Wayside Celtic and he became an instant hit, helping them win the FAI Intermediate Cup in his first season. A year later, they reached the top of the Leinster Senior League table and in the last round of games they played Malahide United in a play-off to decide the champions. His side clinched the Leinster Senior League title, winning 5–0 and he scored twice and was credited with assists for the other three goals.

During his time at Wayside Celtic, he played a Republic of Ireland under-20 amateur international against Spain and helped the Irish win 3–0.

=== UCD ===
Following his performances at Wayside Celtic offers flooded in and the first offer came from UCD, not far from home and he signed in June 2006 on amateur terms. He scored five minutes into his League of Ireland debut as a substitute against Waterford United on 26 June 2006. His season was interrupted as he had already booked holidays before signing for UCD; however, he got a run in the side towards the end of the season and scored three goals in UCD's last three games to help the Students to sixth place in the league. The highlight was the winner at Dalymount Park against Bohemians on 27 October 2006. A week later he was sprung from the bench and scored the winner against Sligo as UCD finished mid-table.

=== Birmingham City ===
In November 2006, Kavanagh went on trial with English Championship side Birmingham City. He made the move permanent on 31 January 2007, but was released at the end of the season without making a single senior appearance.

=== Bray Wanderers ===
Kavanagh returned to Ireland in July 2007 and signed for Bray Wanderers. He instantly became a regular starter for Bray and made 71 appearances for the Seagulls in 2 years. His performances for Bray attracted attention from high-profile clubs including Derry City, Shamrock Rovers and Bohemians. While at Bray he earned a Republic of Ireland U23 cap in November 2007. He was named Player of the Month in the League of Ireland in April 2008.

=== Shamrock Rovers ===
Kavanagh signed for Shamrock Rovers on 27 July 2009. He made his Rovers debut against Cork City on 11 August 2009, and made his home debut at Tallaght Stadium on 15 August 2009 against UCD in the FAI Cup, scoring his first goal for the club. In 2010, Kavanagh won a League of Ireland Premier Division winners medal helping Shamrock Rovers to their first league title in 16 years. Also during the 2010 season Kavanagh appeared twice in Rovers' UEFA Europa League ties against Italian giants Juventus.

=== Shelbourne ===
Following his departure from Shamrock Rovers at the end of 2011 season, Kavanagh signed for newly promoted Shelbourne on 20 January 2012.

=== Derry City ===
Kavanagh spent the 2013 season at Derry City and helped the Candystripes secure a place in Europe with a 4th-place finish.

=== Bohemians ===
On 24 November 2013 Kavanagh confirmed via his Twitter account that he had signed with Bohemians for the 2014 season.

On 25 October 2017 Kavanagh Confirmed via his Twitter account that he has re-sign with Bohemians for the 2018 season for his 5th year with the Dublin side.

== Career statistics ==
Correct as of 30 August 2016.

Club	Season	League	League		FAI Cup		League Cup		Europe ^{1}		Other ^{2}		Total	
Club	Season	League	Apps	Goals	Apps	Goals	Apps	Goals	Apps	Goals	Apps	Goals	Apps	Goals
UCD	2006	Premier Division	10	4	0	0	0	0	-	-	-	-	10	4
UCD	Total		10	4	0	0	0	0	-	-	-	-	10	4
Bray Wanderers	2007	Premier Division	18	3	1	0	0	0	-	-	-	-	19	3
Bray Wanderers	2008	Premier Division	31	5	5	1	3	0	-	-	-	-	39	6
Bray Wanderers	2009	Premier Division	13	1	0	0	0	0	-	-	-	-	13	1
Bray Wanderers	Total		62	9	6	1	3	0	-	-	-	-	71	10
Shamrock Rovers	2009	Premier Division	7	0	1	1	0	0	-	-	-	-	8	1
Shamrock Rovers	2010	Premier Division	22	0	3	0	3	0	4	0	1	0	33	0
Shamrock Rovers	2011	Premier Division	7	0	1	0	1	0	0	0	6	2	15	2
Shamrock Rovers	Total		36	0	5	1	4	0	4	0	7	2	56	3
Shelbourne	2012	Premier Division	28	6	6	0	1	0	-	-	2	0	37	6
Shelbourne	Total		28	6	6	0	1	0	-	-	2	0	37	6
Derry City	2013	Premier Division	16	1	1	0	2	0	2	1	–	–	0	0
Derry City	Total		16	1	1	0	2	0	2	1	0	0	21	1
Bohemians	2014	Premier Division	29	2	1	0	1	0	–	–	–	–	31	2
Bohemians	2015	Premier Division	28	3	0	0	0	0	–	–	–	–	28	3
Bohemians	2016	Premier Division	21	1	0	0	2	0	–	–	–	–	23	1
Bohemians	Total		78	6	1	0	3	0	0	0	0	0	82	6
Career total			230	26	19	2	13	0	6	1	9	2	277	31

^Note 1Competitions include UEFA Europa League
^Note 2Competitions include Setanta Sports Cup and Leinster Senior Cup

== Honours ==
Wayside Celtic

- FAI Intermediate Cup (1): 2005
- Leinster Senior League Senior Division (1): 2005–06

Shamrock Rovers

- A Championship (1): 2009
- League of Ireland (2): 2010, 2011
- Setanta Sports Cup (1): 2011

Bohemians

- Leinster Senior Cup (1): 2015–2016
