= Shay Kelly =

Irish footballer

Shay Kelly is a retired football goalkeeper. Kelly most recently played for Longford Town FC . He signed for the club in 2005 from Bohemians. Shay played a key part in Longford's path to the FAI Cup final in 2007 before narrowly losing to Cork City FC. In 2010, he became a Goalkeeping coach with Shelbourne.
