= Tuomas Haapala =

Finnish footballer (born 1979)

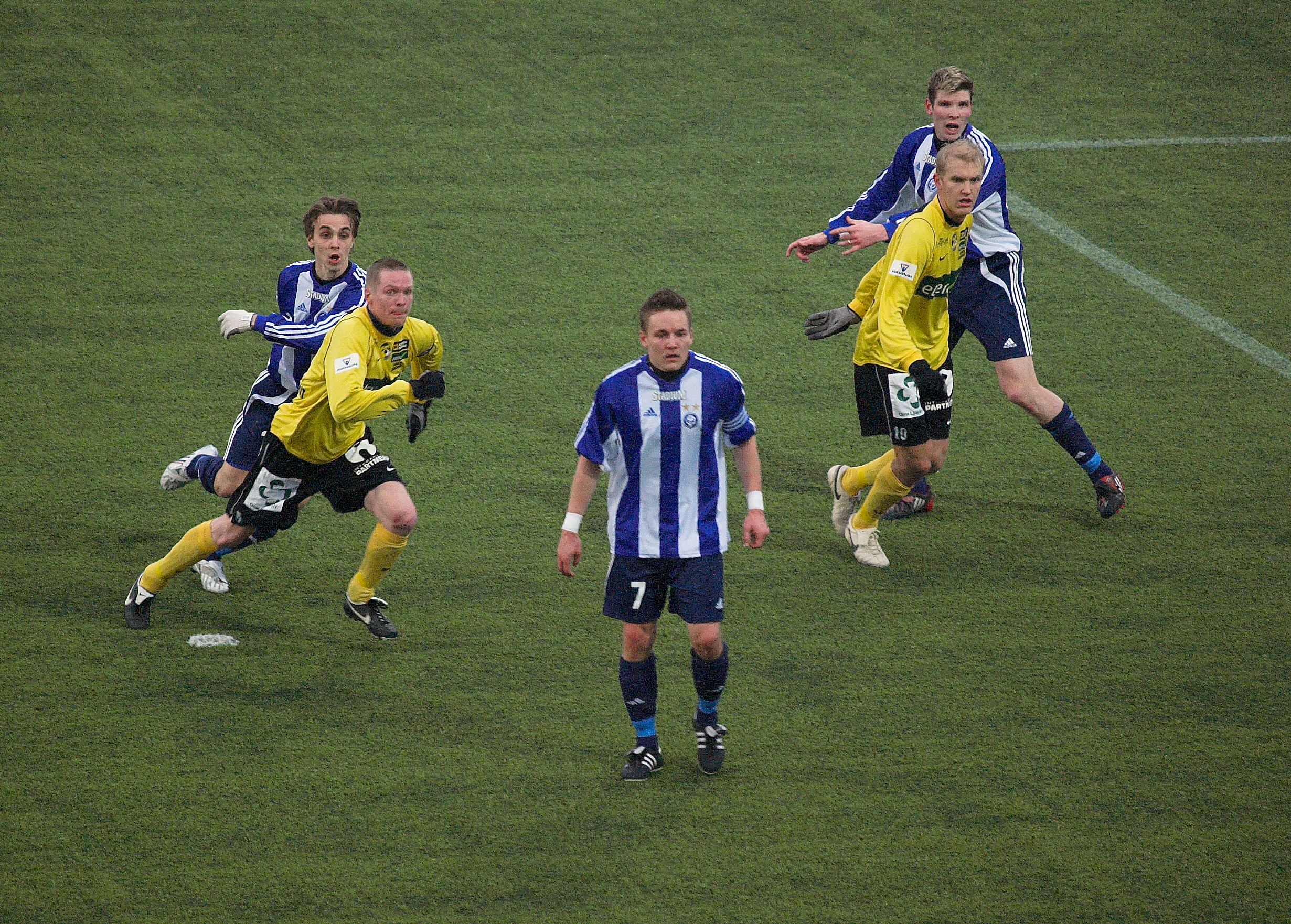
- Haapala (center) at the KuPS vs HJK at Magnum Areena, Kuopio. Finnish League Cup, 11 March 2008

Personal information
- Full name: Tuomas Juhani Haapala
- Date of birth: 20 April 1979 (age 47)
- Place of birth: Lahti, Finland
- Height: 1.78 m (5 ft 10 in)
- Position: Midfielder

Youth career
- –2000: Pallo-Lahti
- Lahden Reipas
- Kuusysi

Senior career*
Years	Team	Apps	(Gls)
2000–2003	Lahti	108	(14)
2004–2005	MyPa	47	(3)
2005–2006	Manchester City	0	(0)
2006–2007	Sandefjord	13	(0)
2007–2009	HJK	38	(0)
2010	Tampere United	21	(1)

International career^{‡}
2005–2008	Finland	4	(0)
- * Club domestic league appearances and goals as of 8 October 2009 ‡ National team caps and goals as of 17 December 2009

Tuomas Juhani Haapala (born 20 April 1979) is a Finnish former footballer who ended his career after 2010.

Haapala has previously played for FC Lahti (2000–03) and MyPa (2004–05) in the Finnish Veikkausliiga. He won the Finnish Cup with MyPa in 2004, and captained the club to the Finnish championship in 2005. After an excellent 2005 season, Haapala was invited for a trial with Manchester City. After two weeks at the club, manager Stuart Pearce decided to offer him a contract to the end of the 2005–06 season. However, Haapala failed to break into the first team, and made only reserve team appearances. After his long try-out in Manchester he signed for Sandefjord Fotball. In August 2007 he joined HJK Helsinki. After three seasons with HJK, Haapala joined Tampere United for the season 2010, which was his last year as a professional football player.

Haapala played his first game for the Finnish national team on 12 October 2005 against Estonia.

== Career statistics ==
As of 1 September 2024.

Appearances and goals by club, season and competition
Club	Season	League			Cup (Note: Includes Suomen Cup and Norwegian Cup)		League cup (Note: Includes Finnish League Cup)		Europe		Total	
Club	Season	Division	Apps	Goals	Apps	Goals	Apps	Goals	Apps	Goals	Apps	Goals
Lahti	1998	Ykkönen	3	0	–		–		–		3	0
RiPS	1999	Ykkönen	23	2	–		–		–		23	2
Lahti	2000	Veikkausliiga	24	1	–		–		–		24	1
Lahti	2001	Veikkausliiga	27	5	–		–		–		27	5
Lahti	2002	Veikkausliiga	28	3	1	0	–		–		29	3
Lahti	2003	Veikkausliiga	26	5	–		–		–		26	5
Lahti	Total		105	14	1	0	0	0	0	0	106	14
MYPA	2004	Veikkausliiga	24	1	1	0	0	0	2 (Note: Appearances in UEFA Intertoto Cup)	0	27	1
MYPA	2005	Veikkausliiga	23	2	0	0	0	0	6 (Note: Appearances in UEFA Cup)	0	29	2
MYPA	Total		47	3	1	0	0	0	8	0	56	3
Manchester City	2005–06	Premier League	0	0	0	0	0	0	0	0	0	0
Sandefjord	2006	Tippeligaen	7	0	1	0	–		–		8	0
Sandefjord	2007	Tippeligaen	6	0	1	0	–		–		6	0
Sandefjord	Total		13	0	2	0	0	0	0	0	15	0
Sandefjord 2	2006	3. divisjon	1	0	–		–		–		1	0
Sandefjord 2	2007	3. divisjon	2	0	–		–		–		2	0
Sandefjord 2	Total		3	0	0	0	0	0	0	0	3	0
HJK Helsinki	2007	Veikkausliiga	9	0	0	0	0	0	2	0	11	0
HJK Helsinki	2008	Veikkausliiga	23	0	0	0	0	0	–		23	0
HJK Helsinki	2009	Veikkausliiga	6	0	0	0	7	0	0	0	13	0
HJK Helsinki	Total		38	0	0	0	7	0	2	0	47	0
Klubi 04	2009	Ykkönen	1	0	–		–		–		1	0
Tampere United	2010	Veikkausliiga	21	1	–		–		–		21	1
Career total			254	19	4	0	7	0	10	0	275	19

== Honours ==
- Finnish championship: 2005, 2009
- Finnish Cup: 2004, 2008
