= Karl Bermingham =

Irish footballer

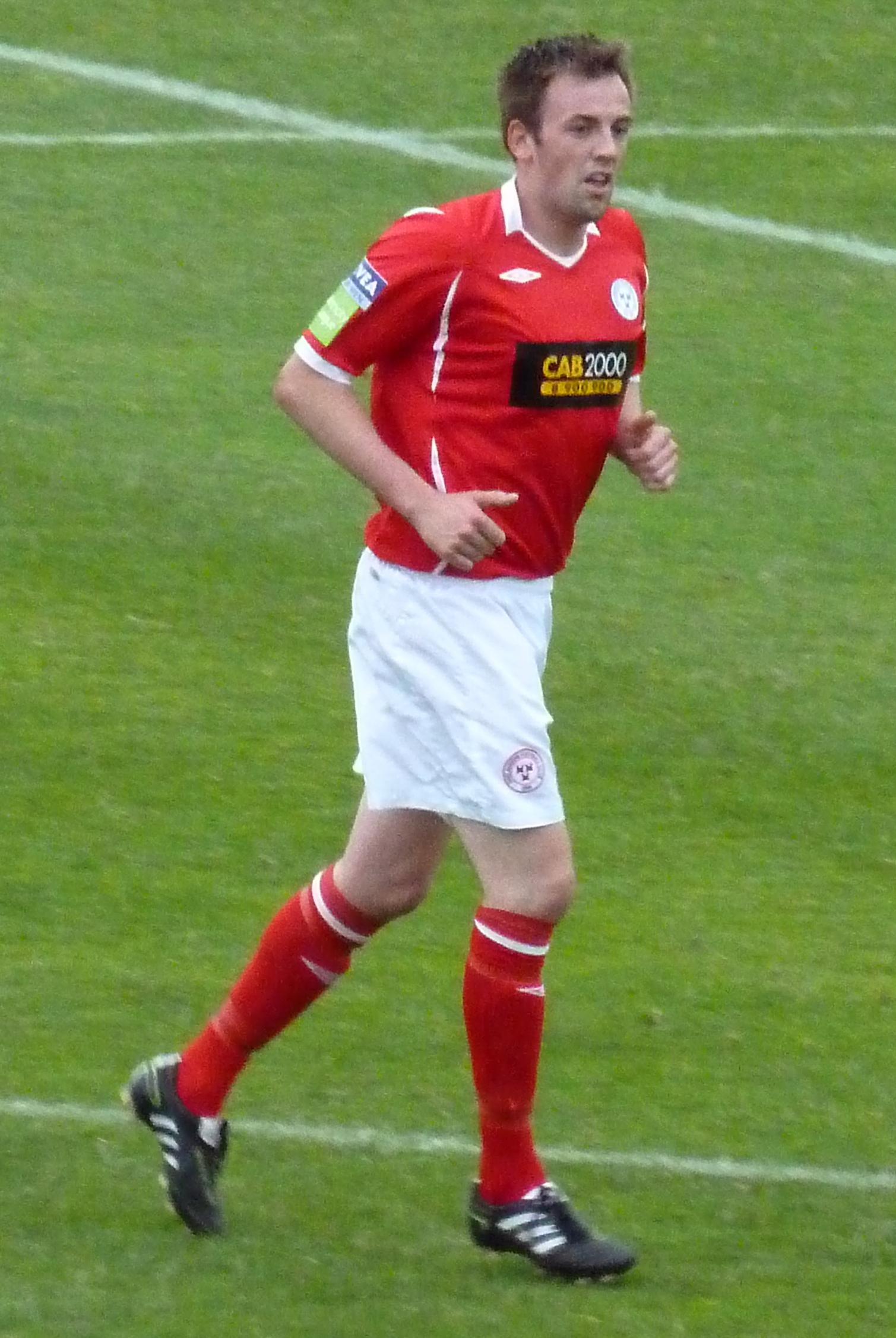

Personal information
- Date of birth: 6 October 1985 (age 41)
- Place of birth: Dublin, Ireland
- Position: Forward

Youth career
- Belvedere
- 2001–2003: Manchester City

Senior career*
Years	Team	Apps	(Gls)
2003–2006	Manchester City	0	(0)
2005	→ Lincoln City (loan)	2	(0)
2005	→ Burnley (loan)	4	(0)
2006–2007	Newry City	5	(4)
2007	Derry City	0	(0)
2007–2008	Waterford United	42	(8)
2009–2010	Monaghan United	54	(27)
2011	Shelbourne	15	(1)
2012	Longford Town	27	(3)
Total		149	(46)

International career
- Republic of Ireland U21
- * Club domestic league appearances and goals as of 30 October 2012

Karl Bermingham (born 6 October 1985) is an Irish former professional footballer who played as a forward.

He began his career in the Premier League with Manchester City spending the first three years of his professional career there, also having brief loan spells with both Lincoln City and Burnley, before returning to his native Ireland. He remained in Irish football for the rest of his career playing for Newry City, Derry City, Waterford United, Monaghan United, Shelbourne, and Longford Town. He has represented the Republic of Ireland at schoolboy level.

== Career ==
=== Early career ===
Bermingham played for the Irish-based club until moving to Manchester City's youth system. He made his league debut, however, for Lincoln City, where he spent three months on loan at the end of the 2004–05 season. At the start of the 2005–06 season, he made a number of appearances in first team friendlies for Manchester City but did not play any competitive matches.

During Autumn 2005, he was loaned out to Burnley, and was released by Manchester City at the end of the 2005–06 season. He had an unsuccessful trial with Dunfermline Athletic in July 2006 before signing with Newry City in October, scoring on his debut against Coleraine.

=== Return to Ireland ===
In early 2007, he was invited to join Derry City on trial prior to the impending kick-off of the 2007 League of Ireland season. Impressing in pre-season, he earned a one-year contract with the Candystripes on 2 February 2007.

In July 2007, Bermingham joined Waterford United and made his first appearance for the Blues against Shamrock Rovers on 10 July 2007. He scored his first goal for the Blues during his home debut against Sligo Rovers in a 2–1 loss.

Bermingham signed for Monaghan United for the 2009 First Division season. In his first season with the Mons, Bermingham scored 17 goals, equalling the club's single season record, held by Andy Myler. The 2010 season was not as successful for Bermingham, with manager Mick Cooke preferring a strikeforce of Sean Brennan and Philly Hughes, but Bermingham still managed to score 10 goals.

Bermingham parted company with Monaghan United following the 2010 season. He scored 29 goals in 70 league and cup appearances for the club. On 20 February 2011, Bermingham signed for Shelbourne. Bermingham secured promotion with Shelbourne to the Premier Division in 2011 but struggled to score goals with one goal in 24 league and cup appearances. He also made an appearance for Shelbourne as a substitute during their 2011 FAI Cup final defeat to Sligo Rovers.

Bermingham departed Shelbourne at end of 2011 and signed for Longford Town ahead of their First Division campaign in 2012. He was released by Longford at the end of the 2012 season.

== Career statistics ==
Correct as of 6 November 2011.

Club	Season	League	League		Cup		League Cup		Other ^{1}		Total	
Club	Season	League	Apps	Goals	Apps	Goals	Apps	Goals	Apps	Goals	Apps	Goals
Lincoln City (loan)	2004–05	FL League 2	2	0	0	0	0	0	-	-	2	0
Lincoln City (loan)	Total		2	0	0	0	0	0	-	-	2	0
Burnley (loan)	2005–06	FL Championship	4	0	0	0	0	0	-	-	4	0
Burnley (loan)	Total		4	0	0	0	0	0	-	-	4	0
Newry City	2006–07	Irish Premier League	5	4	0	0	0	0	-	-	5	4
Newry City	Total		5	4	0	0	0	0	-	-	5	4
Derry City	2007	LOI Premier Division	0	0	0	0	1	0	1	0	2	0
Derry City	Total		0	0	0	0	1	0	1	0	2	0
Waterford United	2007	LOI Premier Division	12	1	4	1	0	0	0	0	16	2
Waterford United	2008	LOI First Division	30	7	1	0	0	0	1	0	32	7
Waterford United	Total		42	8	5	1	0	0	1	0	48	9
Monaghan United	2009	LOI First Division	30	17	4	0	1	0	-	-	35	17
Monaghan United	2010	LOI First Division	24	10	4	2	5	0	2	0	35	12
Monaghan United	Total		54	27	8	2	6	0	2	0	70	29
Shelbourne	2011	LOI First Division	15	1	3	0	3	0	3	0	24	1
Shelbourne	Total		15	1	3	0	3	0	3	0	24	1
Career total			122	40	16	3	10	0	7	0	155	43

^Note 1Competitions include Setanta Sports Cup, Leinster Senior Cup, Munster Senior Cup and League of Ireland promotion/relegation play-offs
