= John Sullivan (Irish footballer) =

Irish footballer

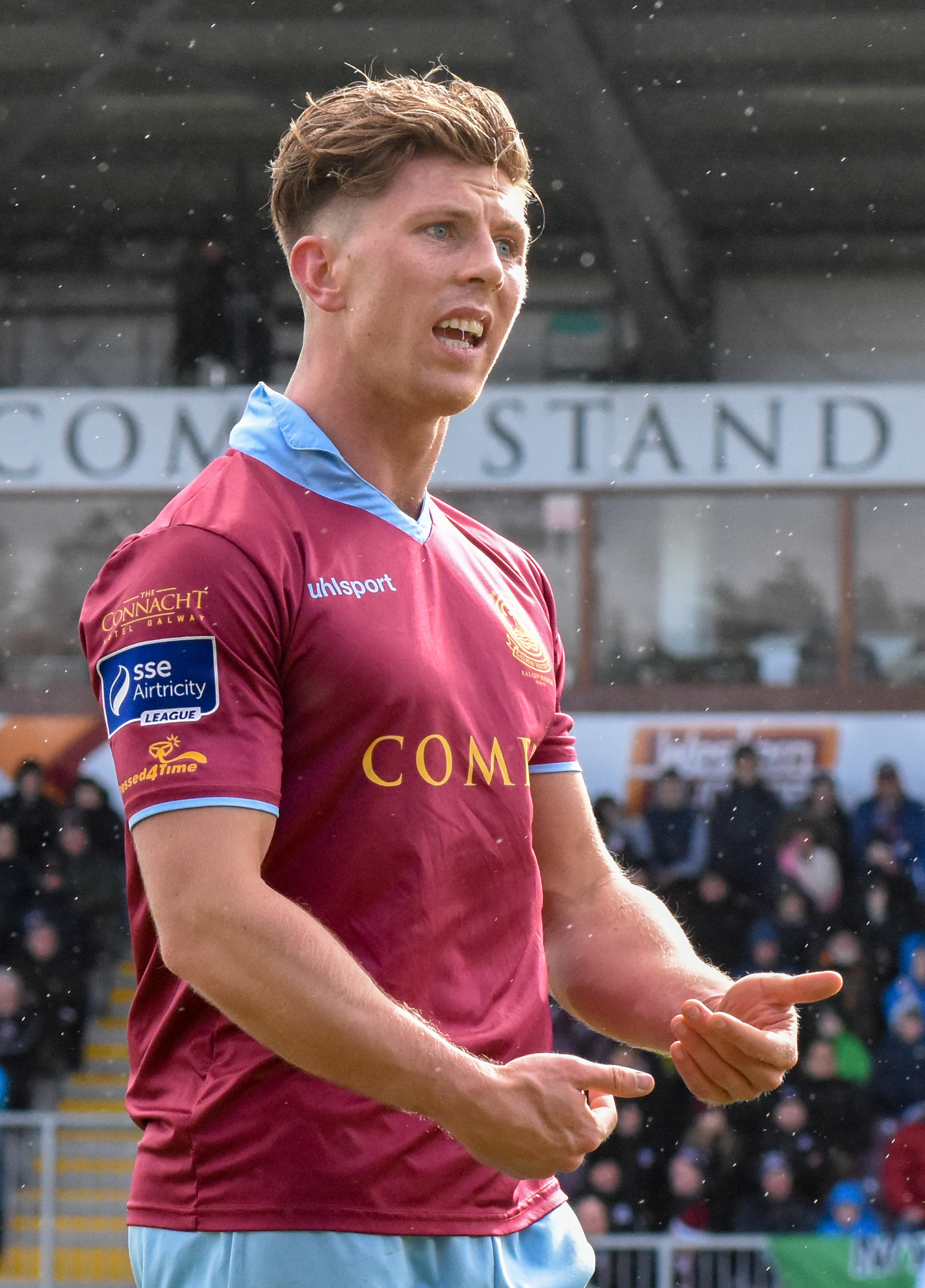
- Sullivan playing for Galway United in 2016

Personal information
- Date of birth: 6 January 1991 (age 35)
- Place of birth: Dublin, Ireland
- Position: Midfielder

Youth career
- Crumlin United
- Bohemians

Senior career*
Years	Team	Apps	(Gls)
2009–2010	Hamilton Academical	2	(0)
2010	Limerick	13	(2)
2011–2012	Shelbourne	12	(0)
2012	Drogheda United	10	(1)
2013	Dundalk	28	(1)
2014	Shelbourne	11	(0)
2015	Crumlin United	2	(0)
2015	Bray Wanderers	18	(2)
2016	Galway United	15	(1)
2016–2018	Bray Wanderers	60	(4)

International career
- Republic of Ireland U17

Managerial career
- 2025–2026: Athlone Town
- * Club domestic league appearances and goals as of 14 December 2018

John Sullivan (born 6 January 1991) is an Irish association football coach and former professional player who was most recently the first team coach at Women's National League club Athlone Town.

== Playing career ==
Sullivan signed for Hamilton Academical on 2 January 2009 from Irish side Bohemians. He made his professional debut on 26 December 2009, in a Scottish Premier League match against Celtic. Sullivan left Hamilton at the end of the 2009–10 season to return to Ireland, spending the 2010 season with Limerick, before moving to Shelbourne in time for the 2011 season.

Sullivan left Shelbourne on 30 July 2012.

Sullivan signed for Dundalk on 8 January 2013.

On 12 December 2015, Sullivan signed for Galway United for the 2016 season. On 4 March 2016, in the season opener against St Patrick's Athletic at Richmond Park, Sullivan made his debut and scored an 83rd-minute header in a 3–1 win. Despite the great start to his time at Galway United, it was announced on 28 June 2016 that Sullivan had left the club citing travel issues.

Sullivan re-signed for Bray Wanderers in July 2016. He left Bray after their 2018 season, spending 2019 playing with amateur teams Bluebell United and Crumlin United.

== Coaching career ==
He retired at 28 years old and joined DLR Waves as a coach for their 2020 season.

On 9 September 2025, Sullivan was appointed as the interim head coach of Athlone Town for the remainder of the 2025 season. Sullivan's first game in charge was a 3–0 defeat to Glasgow City, on 10 September 2025 in the clubs inaugural appearance in the UEFA Women's Europa Cup.
