= Glenn Cronin =

Irish football coach and former player

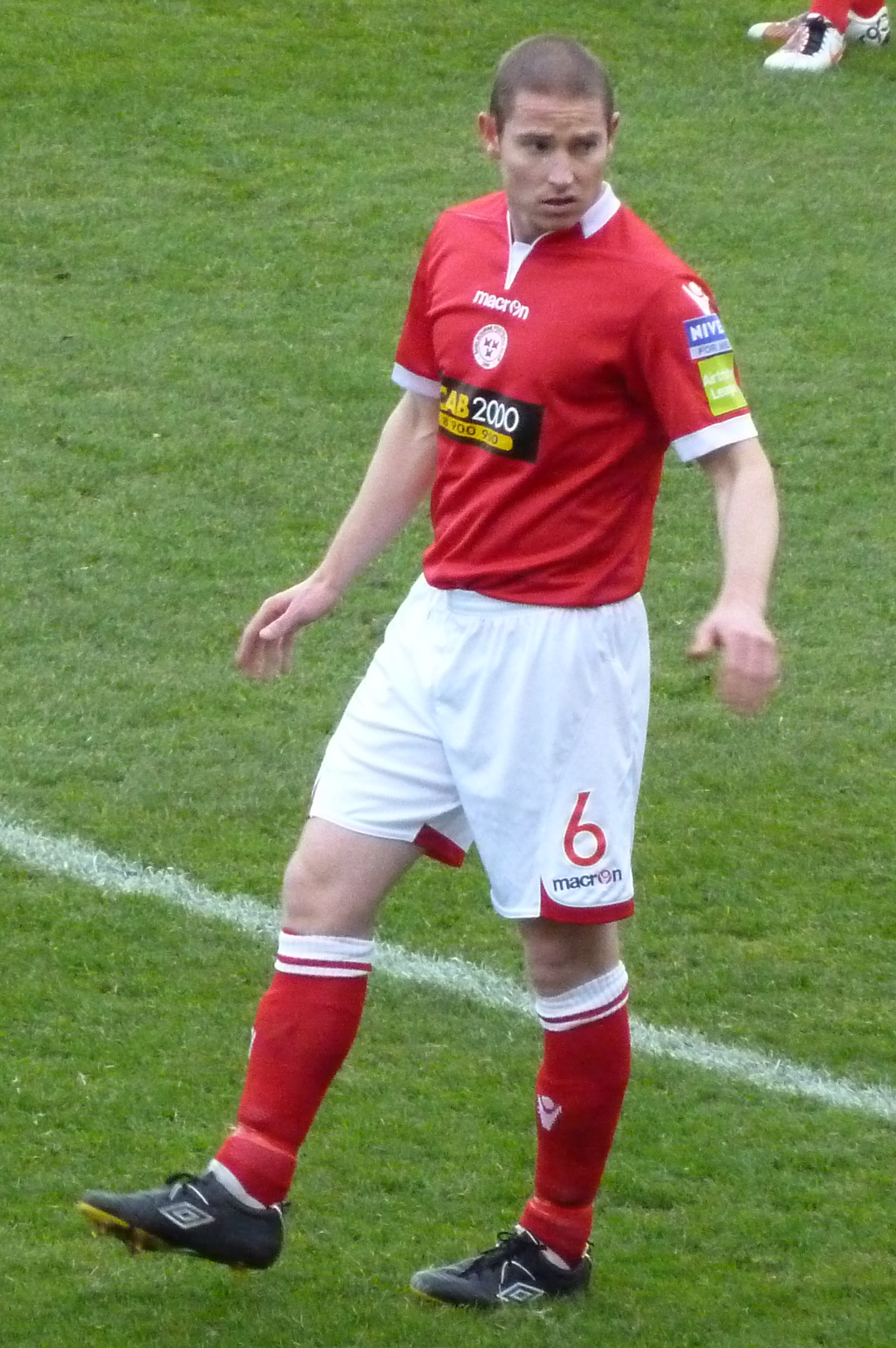

Personal information
- Date of birth: 14 September 1981 (age 45)
- Place of birth: Dublin, Ireland
- Height: 1.73 m (5 ft 8 in)
- Position: Midfielder

Youth career
- Cherry Orchard

Senior career*
Years	Team	Apps	(Gls)
2000–2006	Exeter City	143	(5)
2006–2007	Chester City	4	(0)
2008–2011	Bohemians	96	(3)
2012–2013	Shelbourne	35	(1)
Total		278	(9)

International career
- Republic of Ireland U19

Managerial career
- 2014-: Shamrock Rovers (assistant manager)
- * Club domestic league appearances and goals

Glenn Cronin (born 14 September 1981) is an Irish football coach and former player who is assistant coach at Shamrock Rovers in the League of Ireland Premier Division.

== Club career ==
=== Exeter City ===
A product of Irish junior club Cherry Orchard's well-regarded Youth Academy, Cronin made his debut in 2001, before going onto become a key part of Exeter's first team, playing in central midfield. Following the Grecians' relegation from the English Football League in 2003 he was made club captain, and despite injury problems that kept him out for much of the 2004/05 season.

=== Chester City ===
In July 2006, Cronin signed a contract with Football League Two club Chester City. He missed much of the 2006/07 season with a foot injury. After working his way to recovery, a further foot injury in July 2007 ultimately caused Chester to release him from his contract on 21 November 2007.

=== Bohemians ===
Cronin signed for Bohemians on 27 February 2008 and slotted seamlessly into the side as Bohs marched to the 2008 Premier Division title. Cronin also added an FAI Cup winners medal as Bohs achieved the "Double" by beating Derry City on penalties after a 2–2 draw. The 2009 season was also a successful one for Cronin when, firstly, the Gypsies won the League of Ireland Cup by beating Waterford United 3–1 at the RSC. The success did not end there though as Bohemians won their first back-to-back titles in the club's 119-year history, beating rivals Shamrock Rovers by 4 points. Despite winning the Setanta Sports Cup, Bohemians had a disappointing 2010 season where the club lost their league title on goal difference and failed to make an impact in Europe where they made an embarrassing exit to Welsh side The New Saints. Cronin was one of the club's bright spots though as he had his best season at Bohs to date.

=== Shelbourne ===
Following financial cutbacks at Bohemians at the end of the 2011 season, Cronin departed Bohemians after four successful seasons to join newly promoted local rivals Shelbourne for the 2012 season.

=== Shamrock Rovers ===
Cronin moved into coaching with Rovers initially assisting Pat Fenlon and since 2016 Stephen Bradley

== Other ==
Cronin has represented the Republic of Ireland at youth and levels.

== Career statistics ==
Correct as of 26 October 2012.

Club	Season	League	League		FAI Cup		League Cup		Europe ^{1}		Other ^{2}		Total	
Club	Season	League	Apps	Goals	Apps	Goals	Apps	Goals	Apps	Goals	Apps	Goals	Apps	Goals
Exeter City	2001–02	FL Third Division	30	0	2	0	0	0	-	-	1	0	33	0
Exeter City	2002–03	FL Third Division	39	0	3	0	1	0	-	-	2	0	45	0
Exeter City	2003–04	Conference	40	5	2	0	-	-	-	-	3	0	45	5
Exeter City	2004–05	Conference	4	0	0	0	-	-	-	-	1	0	5	0
Exeter City	2005–06	Conference	30	0	1	0	-	-	-	-	1	0	32	0
Exeter City	Total		143	5	8	0	1	0	-	-	8	0	160	5
Chester City	2006–07	League 2	4	0	0	0	0	0	-	-	0	0	4	0
Chester City	2007–08	League 2	0	0	0	0	0	0	-	-	0	0	0	0
Chester City	Total		4	0	0	0	0	0	-	-	0	0	4	0
Bohemians	2008	LOI Premier Division	18	1	4	0	2	0	2	0	-	-	26	1
Bohemians	2009	LOI Premier Division	26	0	2	1	3	0	1	0	1	0	33	1
Bohemians	2010	LOI Premier Division	32	0	4	0	0	0	1	0	6	0	43	0
Bohemians	2011	LOI Premier Division	20	2	5	0	0	0	2	0	0	0	27	2
Bohemians	Total		96	3	15	1	5	0	6	0	7	0	129	4
Shelbourne	2012	LOI Premier Division	22	1	6	0	0	0	-	-	2	0	30	1
Shelbourne	Total		22	1	6	0	0	0	-	-	2	0	30	1
Career total			265	9	29	1	6	0	6	0	17	0	323	10

^Note 1Competitions include UEFA Champions League, UEFA Europa League and UEFA Intertoto Cup
^Note 2Competitions include Football League Trophy, FA Trophy, Setanta Sports Cup and Leinster Senior Cup

== Honours ==
Bohemians

- League of Ireland: 2008, 2009
- FAI Cup: 2008
- League of Ireland: 2009
- Setanta Sports Cup: 2009–10
