= Alan Mathews =

Irish footballer and manager

Personal information
- Date of birth: 27 June 1965 (age 61)
- Place of birth: Dublin, Ireland

Team information
- Current team: St Patrick's Athletic (Technical Director)

Senior career*
| Years | Team | Apps | (Gls) |
| 1984 | St. Patrick's Athletic | | |
| 1984 | Drogheda United | | |
| 1985–1987 | Shamrock Rovers | 43 | (4) |
| 1987–1988 | Bray Wanderers | 45 | (0) |
| 1988–1991 | Galway United | 128 | (5) |
| 1991–1992 | Kilkenny City | 1 | (0) |
| 1992–1995 | Longford Town | 88 | (4) |
| 1994–1995 | St James's Gate | 4 | (0) |

Managerial career
- 2002–2007: Longford Town
- 2008: Cork City
- 2009–2010: Drogheda United
- 2010–2013: Shelbourne
- 2014–2015: Bray Wanderers
- 2015–2016: Athlone Town
- 2016–2017: Longford Town
- * Club domestic league appearances and goals

Alan Mathews (born 27 June 1965) is an Irish former football player and manager. He is technical director at St Patrick's Athletic.

== Coaching career ==
Following a stint as assistant at Shelbourne, Alan Mathews became Longford manager in the summer of 2002. He went on to become the most successful manager in Longford Town's history, delivering their first senior trophy with a 2–0 win over St. Patrick's in the 2003 FAI Cup final at Lansdowne Road. Longford retained it the following year, completing the double of the FAI Cup and League Cup. He was named Soccer Writers' Association of Ireland "Personality of the Year" in 2003.

Mathews left Longford Town in 2007, and replaced Damien Richardson as Cork City manager on 10 January 2008. In his only season, the club won the Setanta Sports Cup for the first time, despite entering examinership through the courts and losing several key players. Nevertheless, on 9 December 2008, the club announced that Mathews would no longer remain as manager, citing financial constraints as the primary reason for his leaving.

After surviving examinership themselves, Drogheda United unveiled Mathews as their new manager for the 2009 Premier Division season. He guided Drogheda United to Premier Division safety in his first season but following a poor start to Drogheda's 2010 season Mathews resigned as their manager on 17 May 2010.

Mathews made a swift return to the game on 12 July 2010 when he was announced as the new manager of his former club Shelbourne. In the 2011 season he gained promotion with Shels and reached the 2011 FAI Cup final. On 16 May 2013, Mathews resigned as Shelbourne manager with the club bottom of Airtricity League with just one win from thirteen games.

On 10 January 2014, he was appointed manager of Bray Wanderers with Barry O'Connor as his assistant. He left his role in April 2015 citing off-the-field issues at Bray concerning the non-payment of wages to players and coaching staff.

On 15 May 2015, Mathews was appointed as manager of Athlone Town FC. He resigned as their manager on 17 June 2016. Once again off-the-field club financial struggles prompted his departure.

After two months out of the game, Mathews returned to the helm at Longford Town on 19 August 2016 following the resignation of Tony Cousins. Despite having more than two months remaining in the season, Mathews was unable to steer Longford clear of relegation with the midland's side dropping to the First Division for the 2017 season. Following a disappointing series of results which left Longford struggling in mid table, Mathews parted company with the club by mutual consent on 27 May 2017.

In January 2020 it was confirmed, that Mathews had been appointed as a part of the backroom staff at St Patrick's Athletic, the club he had been involved in for a few years as a board member.

== Honours ==
=== Player ===
- Shamrock Rovers Young Player of the Year: 1986–87
- St Patrick’s Athletic Young Player of the Year: 1984–85

=== Manager ===
Longford Town

- FAI Cup: 2003, 2004 2021
- League of Ireland Cup: 2004
- SWAI Personality of the Year: 2003

Cork City

- Setanta Sports Cup: 2008
- Munster Senior Cup: 2007–08

Shelbourne

- Leinster Senior Cup: 2010
