= Brendan McGill =

Irish footballer

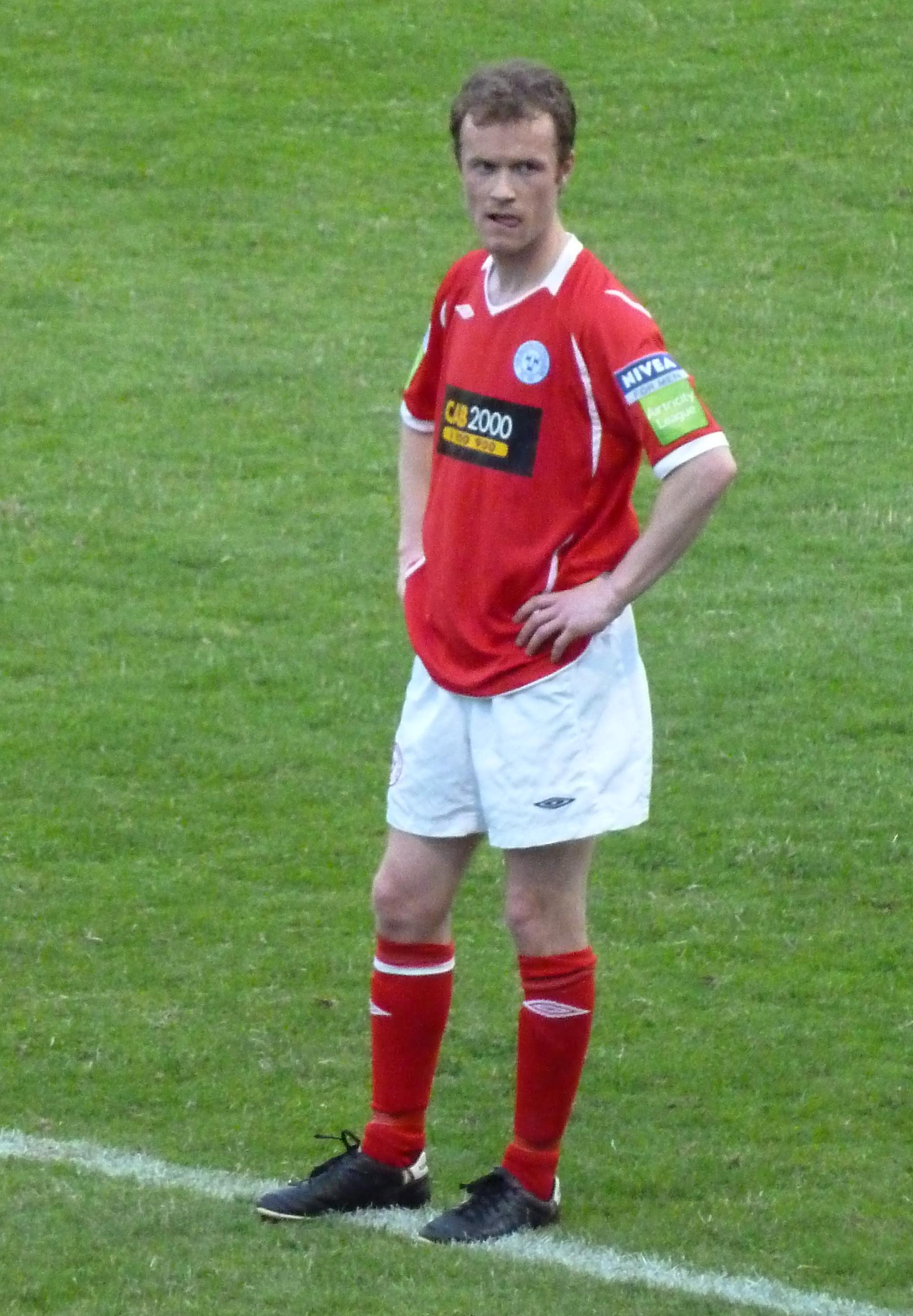

Personal information
- Full name: Brendan McGill
- Date of birth: 22 May 1981 (age 45)
- Place of birth: Dublin, Ireland
- Position: Winger

Senior career*
Years	Team	Apps	(Gls)
1998–2002	Sunderland	0	(0)
2001–2002	→ Carlisle United (loan)	28	(2)
2002–2006	Carlisle United	132	(17)
2006–2008	Gretna	29	(3)
2008	Bohemians	6	(2)
2009	Barrow	17	(0)
2009–2010	Drogheda United	33	(3)
2011–2012	Shelbourne	36	(1)
Total		281	(28)

International career
1998	Republic of Ireland U17	1	(0)
Medal record
Men's football
Representing Republic of Ireland
UEFA Euro U-16
Winner	1998 Scotland
- * Club domestic league appearances and goals

Brendan McGill (born 22 May 1981) is an Irish former footballer who played as a winger.

== Career ==
McGill was born in Dublin. He began his career at Sunderland, for whom he played one game; a 2–1 victory at Luton Town in the League Cup. He then signed for Carlisle United in 2002 and in May 2006, signed for Gretna. On 19 May 2008, McGill was a part of the remaining 40 staff members who were released by Gretna. Conference National side York City had lined up signing McGill, but he chose to return to Ireland and signed for Bohemians. He made his debut as a second-half substitute away to Galway United on 22 August. McGill made his first start away to Sligo Rovers, getting on the scoresheet in the process. After just four months with Bohemians, he returned to Cumbria, signing for Barrow of the Conference National in January 2009. He helped Barrow keep their place in the Conference National but was released at the end of the season, with the club's managers stating that he did not fit into future plans. McGill signed for Drogheda United on 8 July 2009. His first Drogheda goal came in a 4–0 win over Galway United on 21 October 2009.

Following a season and a half at Drogheda United, McGill joined League of Ireland First Division side Shelbourne for their 2011 campaign.

== Honours ==
Carlisle United

- Football League Two: 2005–06
- Football League Trophy runner-up: 2002–03, 2005–06

Gretna

- Scottish Football League First Division: 2006–07

Bohemians

- FAI Cup: 2008

Republic of Ireland

- UEFA European Under-17 Championship: 1998
