= Philip Hughes (footballer, born 1981) =

Irish footballer (born 1981)

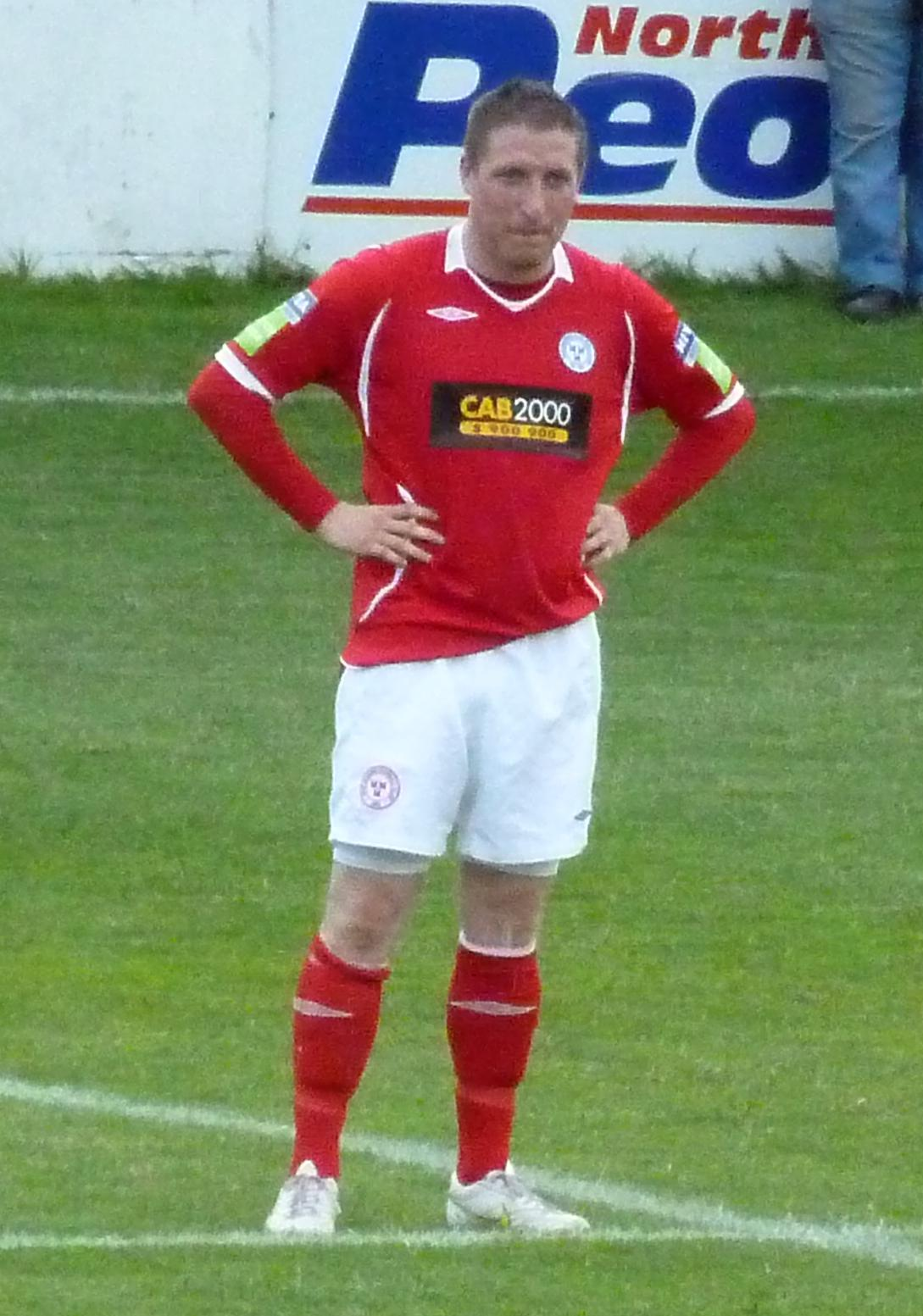

Personal information
- Date of birth: 12 September 1981 (age 45)
- Place of birth: Dublin, Ireland
- Position: Forward

Team information
- Current team: St. Mochta's

Senior career*
Years	Team	Apps	(Gls)
1999–2000	Tolka Rovers	22	(9)
2000–2001	St. Francis	10	(3)
2001–2003	St Patrick's Athletic	14	(3)
2001–2002	→ Kilkenny City (loan)	20	(15)
2003	Kildare County	33	(10)
2004	Dublin City	20	(3)
2004	→ UCD (loan)	12	(3)
2005	Monaghan United	35	(8)
2006–2007	Dundalk	63	(27)
2008	Shelbourne	8	(0)
2008	Kildare County	13	(1)
2009	Phoenix FC	?	(?)
2009	Kildare County	19	(7)
2010	Monaghan United	31	(14)
2011–2013	Shelbourne	58	(31)
2013	→ St Patrick's Athletic (loan)	0	(0)
2014	Drogheda United	13	(1)
2014	→ Bray Wanderers (loan)	13	(0)
2015	Shelbourne	11	(6)
2015–	St. Mochta's	69	(23)
- * Club domestic league appearances and goals

Philip Hughes (born 12 September 1981) is an Irish footballer who plays as a forward for St. Mochta's in the Leinster Senior League. He was selected on the Professional Footballers' Association of Ireland Team of the Year on several occasions, as well as being selected as the overall "Player of the Year". As of 2018, Hughes had played with eleven different League of Ireland teams, including Dundalk, Monaghan United and Shelbourne for several spells.

== Career ==
=== Early career ===
Hughes, a much travelled player, began his football career with Tolka Rovers during the 1999–2000 season, scoring nine goals in 22 appearances. Initially playing at intermediate level, he made the step up to League of Ireland football with St. Francis at the beginning of the 2000–01 season. Hughes was signed by St. Patrick's Athletic later that season. First team opportunities at Richmond Park became difficult to obtain for Hughes resulting in his departure on loan to First Division Kilkenny City during the 2001–02 season. Hughes scored 15 goals in 20 games for Kilkenny that season. His performances with Kilkenny saw him recalled to St. Patrick's Athletic, but yet again first team opportunities were limited for Hughes.

=== Kildare County, Dublin City and UCD ===
Hughes departed St. Pats at the end of the 2002–03 campaign, to join Kildare County for the first summer soccer season of 2003. He became a regular in the county side that season helping them to a fifth-place finish in the First Division with a contribution of 10 goals in 33 league appearances. Hughes departed County after that season to join Dublin City, who had achieved promotion to the League of Ireland Premier Division for the 2004 season. It was a difficult season for Hughes as scored just three goals in 20 appearances for the struggling Vikings, and he was initially released along with 14 other players by new Dublin City manager Roddy Collins in a mid-season cull. Hughes joined First Division UCD on loan for the remainder of the 2004 season, where he scored three goals in 12 appearances to help the UCD to promotion to the Premier Division.

=== Monaghan United and Dundalk ===
Hughes' next destination was First Division Monaghan United for the 2005 season. He scored eight goals in 25 appearances that season for Monaghan United before joining his former manager at Kilkenny, Kildare and Dublin City, John Gill at First Division promotion chasing Dundalk. Hughes made his Dundalk debut on the first day of the 2006 League of Ireland First Division season in a 2–1 defeat away to Shamrock Rovers at Tolka Park on 10 March 2006. He went on to score 21 goals that season for Dundalk, helping them to a second-place finish and a play-off victory over Waterford United. Despite that victory, Dundalk did not achieve promotion as they failed to qualify on criteria for the FAI's revamped Premier Division. Hughes' 2006 season attracted interest from several Premier Division clubs including Bohemians, but despite this interest, Hughes chose to remain at Dundalk for the 2007 First Division season. The 2007 campaign started brightly for Hughes and Dundalk as they set the pace in the First Division up to the mid-season point. Hughes lost form and struggled for fitness for the remainder of the season and his goal tally was only at six goals by the end of the season.

=== Shelbourne and Kildare County ===
Hughes was released by Dundalk immediately after the conclusion of the 2007 season, but he did not wait long to find a new club when he joined Shelbourne on 29 November 2007. He made his Shelbourne debut in a scoreless draw against his former club Dundalk at Tolka Park on 7 March 2008. Hughes once again struggled for fitness at Shelbourne and as a consequence he was restricted to mainly substitute appearances. He departed the club on 14 July 2008, after just half a season to rejoin his former club Kildare County. Following the conclusion of the 2008 season, Hughes departed Kildare County to join Leinster Senior League Senior Division outfit Phoenix F.C. but the striker returned to County on 4 June 2009 for a third spell. In his third spell at Kildare County, he scored 7 goals in 19 league appearances. Kildare County went into liquidation shortly before their final game of 2009 against Shelbourne and following the resignation of Kildare manager Joey Summerville, Hughes took the managers role for the club's final game in football.

=== Return to Monaghan United and Shelbourne ===
On 21 December 2009, it was announced by Monaghan United that Hughes would be returning to the club for a second spell in the 2010 season. Hughes carried forward his recaptured form in 2009 to Monaghan, and scored 22 goals in 44 competitive games. Monaghan narrowly missing out on promotion to the Premier Division after a play-off defeat to Bray Wanderers.

At the end of 2010 season, Hughes once again moved club this time joining Monaghan United teammate Barry Clancy at Shelbourne for his second spell at the Tolka Park club.

Hughes signed a new contract with Shelbourne in November 2012 despite being offered more money by Drogheda United and Bohemians.

At the end of the 2012 League of Ireland season Hughes was joint seventeenth in the all-time League of Ireland goalscoring list with 130 league goals

=== St Patrick's Athletic loan ===
Hughes was announced as St Patrick's Athletic second summer signing on 2 July 2013 on loan from Dublin rivals Shelbourne. Hughes was given the number 27 shirt and made his first appearance since his return to the club on 4 July, in the Europa League away to Žalgiris at the LFF Stadium in Vilnius, Lithuania.

=== Drogheda and Bray Wanderers ===
Hughes agreed to join Drogheda United for the 2014 League of Ireland season, but midway through the season he signed for Bray Wanderers.
